= Tees Maar Khan (soundtrack) =

Soundtrack album by Vishal–Shekhar and Shirish Kunder
- Released: 10 November 2010
- Recorded: 2010
- Genre: Feature film soundtrack
- Length: 40:38
- Language: Hindi
- Label: T-Series
- Producers: Vishal–Shekhar; Shirish Kunder

Vishal–Shekhar chronology
Break Ke Baad (2010)	Tees Maar Khan (2010)	Bbuddah... Hoga Terra Baap (2011)

Shirish Kunder chronology
Jaan-E-Mann (2006)	Tees Maar Khan (2010)	Joker (2012)

Tees Maar Khan is the soundtrack album to the 2010 film of the same name directed by Farah Khan starring Akshay Kumar, Akshaye Khanna and Katrina Kaif in lead roles. The film's soundtrack featured nine songs, Shirish Kunder wrote and composed the title track and its remix, while the rest of the songs were composed by Vishal–Shekhar and written by Vishal Dadlani and Anvita Dutt Guptan. The album was released under the T-Series label on 10 November 2010. The song "Sheila Ki Jawani" emerged as the most popular song from the album as well as one of the biggest hits of the year.

== Background ==
Vishal–Shekhar composed the music and score in their second collaboration with Farah after their highly successful soundtrack for Om Shanti Om (2007). The duo started working on the film's music by early 2010. Initially, Farah intended to rope in Anu Malik and Pritam as guest composers, but the production team dismissed those claims. However, Shirish Kunder, who wrote, co-produced and edited the film, had composed and written lyrics for the title track. Sonu Nigam recorded the song in 54 different voices. He stated that, he recorded several versions of the song in numerous modulations but felt difficult to choose any one, which resulted in Kunder incorporating all of his versions in a single song. Nigam further recorded the choral portions, which included female voices and a mixture of Japanese, Chinese, Arabic, French, and other accents and also mimicked Kumar's voice which he most enjoyed, adding "I sound so much like him that even Farah couldn't make out the difference". Dadlani wrote the lyrics for the song "Sheila Ki Jawani"; the hook line is based on the fictional film which Kaif's character Anya is acting in, while Dadlani plays the fictional film's lascivious producer.

== Release ==
T-Series acquired the film's music rights. Instead of a traditional music launch, Farah wanted the film's music to be released in an unusual manner. Since the film is centered on a train heist, the team decided to release the soundtrack via a train journey. The cast and crew along with media professionals booked a train from Mumbai to Lonavala, on 10 November 2010, for the music launch. After reaching Lonavala, the team headed to lunch at the Dukes Hotel and returned to Mumbai by the same train.

== Track listing ==
No.	Title	Lyrics	Music	Singer(s)	Length
1.	"Tees Maar Khan"	Shirish Kunder	Shirish Kunder	Sonu Nigam	4:17
2.	"Sheila Ki Jawani"	Vishal Dadlani	Vishal–Shekhar	Vishal Dadlani, Sunidhi Chauhan	4:43
3.	"Wallah Re Wallah"	Anvita Dutt Guptan	Vishal–Shekhar	Shekhar Ravjiani, Shreya Ghoshal, Raja Hasan, Kamaal Khan	5:28
4.	"Badey Dilwala"	Anvita Dutt Guptan	Vishal–Shekhar	Shreya Ghoshal, Sukhwinder Singh	4:55
5.	"Happy Ending"	Anvita Dutt Guptan	Vishal–Shekhar	Harshit Saxena, Abhijeet Sawant, Debojit Saha, Prajakta Shukre	4:43
6.	"Tees Maar Khan" (Remix by DJ Kiran Kamath)	Shirish Kunder	Shirish Kunder	Sonu Nigam	4:18
7.	"Sheila Ki Jawani" (Remix by DJ A-Myth)	Vishal Dadlani	Vishal–Shekhar	Vishal Dadlani, Sunidhi Chauhan	4:48
8.	"Wallah Re Wallah" (Remix by DJ Kiran Kamath)	Anvita Dutt Guptan	Vishal–Shekhar	Shekhar Ravjiani, Shreya Ghoshal, Raja Hasan, Kamal Khan	4:29
9.	"Badey Dilwala" (Remix by DJ Kiran Kamath)	Anvita Dutt Guptan	Vishal–Shekhar	Shreya Ghoshal, Sukhwinder Singh	4:57
Total length:					40:38

== Reception ==
NDTV-based critic, reviewed the album positively, saying "the album is a must hear and a fun package of dance numbers that will keep the energy high." Joginder Tuteja of Bollywood Hungama summarized "One expected a moon from Tees Maar Khan, especially so since it is coming together of a team which believes in bringing to audience a full-on 'masala' outings. Such immense expectations means that a relatively lesser volume of content in the album (there are in total five original songs) with a couple of them being situational results in one left with a slight desire of something more. However, if one looks at it as an album that would find itself picked up from the shelves pronto, Tees Maar Khan is bound to become one of the top selling in the year due to high curiosity value."

However, Karthik Srinivasan of Milliblog noted that "Sheila [Ki Jawani] and Wallah [Re Wallah] save this Khan from maar (transl. death)". In her review for Rediff.com, Sukanya Verma was critical of the album, saying "A tongue-in-cheek subject like this begs for unbridled, playful imagination in its soundtrack. Instead you're teased with slipshod creativity and pedestrian lyrics. Without doubt, this is a hugely disappointing album from an otherwise promising team." Lalitha Suhasini of Mid-Day called the album "passable" and added "Had it not been for Sheila Ki Jawani, the album may have just been written off."

The song "Sheila Ki Jawani" emerged as one of the biggest hits of 2010 and the most popular song from the album. Its popularity led to comparisons between "Munni Badnaam Hui", another hit item number from Dabangg (2010).

== Awards and nominations ==
Award	Date of ceremony (Note: Date is linked to the article about the awards held that year, wherever possible.)	Category	Recipients	Result	Ref.
BIG Star Entertainment Awards	21 December 2010	Most Entertaining Song	"Sheila Ki Jawani"	Nominated	
BIG Star Entertainment Awards	21 December 2010	Most Entertaining Singer – Female	Sunidhi Chauhan for "Sheila Ki Jawani"	Won	
Screen Awards	6 January 2011	Best Female Playback Singer	Sunidhi Chauhan for "Sheila Ki Jawani"	Nominated	
Screen Awards	6 January 2011	Best Choreography	Farah Khan for "Sheila Ki Jawani"	Nominated	
Zee Cine Awards	14 January 2011	Best Music Director	Vishal–Shekhar	Nominated	
Zee Cine Awards	14 January 2011	Sa Re Ga Ma Pa – Song of the Year	"Sheila Ki Jawani"	Nominated	
Zee Cine Awards	14 January 2011	Best Lyricist	Vishal Dadlani for "Sheila Ki Jawani"	Nominated	
Zee Cine Awards	14 January 2011	Best Male Playback Singer	Sonu Nigam for "Tees Maar Khan"	Nominated	
Zee Cine Awards	14 January 2011	Best Female Playback Singer	Sunidhi Chauhan for "Sheila Ki Jawani"	Nominated	
Zee Cine Awards	14 January 2011	Best Choreography	Farah Khan for "Sheila Ki Jawani"	Won	
Filmfare Awards	29 January 2011	Best Female Playback Singer	Sunidhi Chauhan for "Sheila Ki Jawani" (Note: Shared with Mamta Sharma for "Munni Badnaam Hui" from Dabangg (2010))	Won	
Filmfare Awards	29 January 2011	Best Choreography	Farah Khan for "Sheila Ki Jawani"	Won	
Apsara Film & Television Producers Guild Awards	12 January 2011	Best Female Playback Singer	Sunidhi Chauhan for "Sheila Ki Jawani"	Won	
Apsara Film & Television Producers Guild Awards	12 January 2011	Best Choreography	Farah Khan for "Sheila Ki Jawani"	Nominated	
International Indian Film Academy Awards	23–25 June 2011	Best Female Playback Singer	Sunidhi Chauhan for "Sheila Ki Jawani"	Nominated	
Mirchi Music Awards	27 January 2011	Best Song of the Year	"Sheila Ki Jawani"	Nominated	
Mirchi Music Awards	27 January 2011	Listeners' Choice Song of the Year	"Sheila Ki Jawani"	Won	
Mirchi Music Awards	27 January 2011	Best Item Song of the Year	"Sheila Ki Jawani"	Nominated	
Mirchi Music Awards	27 January 2011	Best Female Vocalist	Sunidhi Chauhan for "Sheila Ki Jawani"	Nominated	
Global Indian Music Academy Awards	30 October 2011	Best Film Album	Tees Maar Khan	Nominated	
Global Indian Music Academy Awards	30 October 2011	Best Song	"Sheila Ki Jawani"	Nominated	
Global Indian Music Academy Awards	30 October 2011	Most Popular Caller Tune of the Year	"Sheila Ki Jawani"	Won	
Global Indian Music Academy Awards	30 October 2011	Best Female Playback Singer	Sunidhi Chauhan for "Sheila Ki Jawani"	Won	
Global Indian Music Academy Awards	30 October 2011	Best Music Arranger and Programmer	Abhijit Nalani for "Sheila Ki Jawani"	Nominated	
