= Zayn Marie Khan =

Indian actress (born 1995)

- Born: 20 March 1995 (age 31); Mumbai, Maharashtra, India
- Occupation: Actress
- Years active: 2016–present
- Spouse: Akash Mohimen (m. 2021)
- Father: Mansoor Khan
- Family: Khan–Hussain family

Zayn Marie Khan is an Indian actress. She is the daughter of director Mansoor Khan and niece of actor Aamir Khan.

== Early life and family ==
Born in the Khan–Hussain family of Bollywood, Zayn Marie Khan is the daughter of director Mansoor Khan and Tina Khan. She has a brother named Pablo Ivaan Khan. Actor and filmmaker Aamir Khan is her uncle, and actors Imran Khan and Junaid Khan are her cousins.

== Career ==
Khan served as assistant director in the films Kapoor & Sons (2016) and Secret Superstar (2017). She made her acting debut in 2020 in the Netflix crime thriller film Mrs. Serial Killer, directed by Shirish Kunder. In a rare occasion for a Bollywood actress, Khan performed action scenes in the film. She then featured opposite Neeraj Madhav in the series Feels Like Ishq (2021) as Shahana in the fifth episode, "The Interview", directed by Sachin Kundalkar. Her performance was well received by critics. She, along with Taaruk Raina played the eponymous couple in the Netflix series Aryan & Meera (2021).

Khan's role of Shalu Vartak, sister of Rajkummar Rao's character, in the Netflix comedy crime thriller Monica, O My Darling (2022) earned her further recognition. Also in 2022, Khan appeared in the second season of Zoya Akhtar's Made in Heaven, as Sarina Kapoor, a bride-to-be struggling with insecurities over her dark complexion.

In 2024, she featured as Zoya Ahmed, a lawyer and the rival of Neha Sharma's character, in the third season of Illegal - Justice, Out of Order. The courtroom drama series was released on JioCinema. Khan next will be seen alongside Sanjay Mishra in her cousin Junaid Khan's production debut, Preetam Pyaare.

== Personal life ==
In 2021, Khan married actor Akash Mohimen in an intimate ceremony held in Alibaug.

== Filmography ==
=== Films ===
Year	Title	Role	Notes	Ref(s)
2020	Mrs. Serial Killer	Anushka Tiwari	Debut film	
2022	Monica, O My Darling	Sarika Vartak		
2026	Dacoit: A Love Story	SI S. Janaki	Telugu-Hindi bilingual film	

=== Web series ===
Year	Title	Role	Notes	Ref(s)
2021	Feels Like Ishq	Shahana	Episode: "The Interview"	
2021	Aryan & Meera	Meera Rao		
2022	Made in Heaven	Sarina Kapoor	Episode: "Mirror Mirror on the Wall"	
2024	Illegal - Justice, Out of Order	Zoya Ahmed		
