= List of awards and nominations received by Manish Malhotra =

Manish Malhotra awards and nominations
Awards and nominations
| Award | Wins | Nominations |
| Bollywood Fashion Awards | 5 | 5 |
| Bollywood Movie Awards | 5 | 5 |
| Filmfare Awards | 1 | 2 |
| Filmfare Awards (South) | 1 | 1 |
| IIFA Awards | 4 | 4 |
| Zee Cine Awards | 2 | 3 |
| Others | 29 | 29 |

Totals (Note: Certain award groups do not simply award one winner. They acknowledge several different recipients, have runners-up, and have third place. Since this is a specific recognition and is different from losing an award, runner-up mentions are considered wins in this award tally. For simplification and to avoid errors, each award in this list has been presumed to have had a prior nomination.)
- Wins: 47
- Nominations: 49

== Filmfare Awards ==
The Filmfare Awards are one of the oldest Hindi film awards. They are presented annually by The Times Group for excellence of cinematic achievements. Manish received one award.

| Year | Film | Result | Ref. | |
|---|---|---|---|---|
| 1996 | Rangeela | Won | | |
| 2008 | Best Costume Design | Om Shanti Om | | Nominated |

== Filmfare Awards (South) ==
| Year | Category | Film | Result |
|---|---|---|---|
| 2011 | Best Costume Design | Enthiran | Won |

== Filmfare Style Awards ==
| Year | Film | Result | Ref. |
|---|---|---|---|
| 2017 | Most Stylish Designer | Won | |

== Bollywood Movie Awards ==
| Year | Category | Film | Result |
|---|---|---|---|
| 1999 | Best Costume Design | Kuch Kuch Hota Hai | Won |
| 2002 | Best Costume Design | Kabhi Khushi Kabhie Gham | Won |
| 2005 | Best Costume Design | Veer Zara | Won |
| 2006 | Best Costume Design | Kaal | Won |
| 2007 | Best Costume Design | Kabhi Alvida Naa Kehna | Won |

== IIFA Awards ==
| Year | Category | Film | Result |
|---|---|---|---|
| 2001 | Best Costume Design | Mohabbatein | Won |
| 2002 | Best Costume Design | Kabhi Khushi Kabhie Gham | Won |
| 2004 | Best Costume Design | Kal Ho Naa Ho | Won |
| 2008 | Best Costume Design | Om Shanti Om | Won |

== Samsung Wizcraft IIFA Awards ==
| Year | Category | Result |
|---|---|---|
| - | Best Costume Design | Won |
| 2017 | Best Costume Design | Won |

== Zee Cine Awards ==
| Year | Category | Film | Result |
|---|---|---|---|
| 2001 | Best Costume Design | Mohabbatein | Won |
| 2005 | Best Costume Design | Main Hoon Na | Nominated |
| 2008 | Best Costume Design (Fashion Show) | 'Zenith London' | Won |

== Iconic Gold Awards ==
| Year | Category | Film | Result |
|---|---|---|---|
| 2022 | Iconic Outstanding Contribution in Bollywood Fashion | — | Won |

== Other awards ==
- Showtime Opinion Poll Award for Raja Hindustani
- Rok Glam Award Zoom for Contemporary Wear Design - Women in 2007
- Siemen's Viewer's Choice Award for Dil To Pagal Hai
- Stylish Designer Of the Year at the Elle Style Awards in 1999
- Indo American Society Award for contribution to Fashion Designing
- Indira Priyadarshini Memorial Award for his contribution to the fashion industry
- Manish was Felicitated by National Institute Of Fashion Technology
- Indian Affairs of Network 7 Media Group felicitated Manish at India Leadership Conclave 2013 as "Fashion Icon of the Decade 2013".
