= Om Shanti Om (disambiguation) =

Om Shanti Om is a 2007 Indian romantic thriller film by Farah Khan

Om Shanti Om may also refer to:

- Om Shanti Om (soundtrack), soundtrack album of the 2007 film by Vishal–Shekhar
- Om Shanti Om, a 2005 Indian Odia-language film starring Sidhant Mohapatra
- Om Shanthi Om, a 2015 Indian film
- Om Shanti Om (TV series), 2017 Indian musical television series
- Om Shanti Om (album), 2020 live album by Don Cherry

== See also ==
- Om (disambiguation)
- Om Shanti, a Hindu mantra
- Om Shanti (film), a 2010 Indian film
- Ohm Shanthi Oshaana, a 2014 Indian film
