= Manush Nandan =

Indian cinematographer

- Born: Chennai, Tamil Nadu, India
- Years active: 2008—present
- Spouse: Gowri (m. 2013)
- Parent(s): Gnani Sankaran (father); AS Padmavathi (mother)

Manush Nandan ISC is an Indian cinematographer who predominantly works in Hindi language films besides having worked in Tamil and Malayalam language films. He studied at the Film and Television Institute of Tamil Nadu and worked under Ravi K. Chandran during his early days and for his directorial debut Yaan (2014). He worked as an assistant cinematographer for Rab Ne Bana Di Jodi (2008) and My Name is Khan (2010) before being recommended to Farah Khan by an assistant director to work on Happy New Year (2014). He has since worked on several well known Hindi films such as Thugs of Hindostan (2018) and Rocky Aur Rani Kii Prem Kahaani (2023).

== Personal life ==
He is the son of writers Gnani Sankaran and AS Padmavathi. He married Gowri in 2013.

== Filmography ==
Year	Title	Language	Notes	Ref.
2010	Manmadhan Ambu	Tamil		
2011	Jo Hum Chahein	Hindi		
2013	Ishkq in Paris	Hindi		
2014	Yaan	Tamil		
2014	Happy New Year	Hindi		
2016	Kriti	Hindi	Short film	
2016	Devi; Abhinetri; Tutak Tutak Tutiya	Tamil; Telugu; Hindi		
2018	Thugs of Hindostan	Hindi		
2020	Gunjan Saxena: The Kargil Girl	Hindi		
2022	Samrat Prithviraj	Hindi		
2023	Rocky Aur Rani Kii Prem Kahaani	Hindi		
2023	Dunki	Hindi	with C. K. Muraleedharan and Amit Roy	
2025	Sunny Sanskari Ki Tulsi Kumari	Hindi		
2025	Gustaakh Ishq	Hindi		
2026	Patriot	Malayalam		
