= Mrs. Serial Killer =

2020 Indian film by Shirish Kunder

- Official release poster
- Directed by: Shirish Kunder
- Written by: Shirish Kunder
- Produced by: Farah Khan; Shirish Kunder
- Starring: Jacqueline Fernandez; Manoj Bajpayee; Mohit Raina
- Cinematography: Ravi K. Chandran; Kiran Deohans
- Edited by: Shirish Kunder
- Music by: Shirish Kunder
- Production company: Three's Company Productions Pvt.Ltd
- Distributed by: Netflix
- Release date: 1 May 2020
- Running time: 106 minutes
- Country: India
- Language: Hindi

Mrs. Serial Killer, also spelled as Mrs Serial Killer, is a 2020 Indian crime thriller film, written and directed by Shirish Kunder and produced by his wife Farah Khan. The film stars Jacqueline Fernandez, Manoj Bajpayee and Mohit Raina in lead roles while Aamir Khan's niece Zayn Marie Khan makes her acting debut in the film.

Jacqueline plays the title role of the film. The film was released on Netflix on 1 May, coinciding with May Day.

== Plot ==
Sona tells her husband Mrityunjoy Mukherjee (Joy) that she's pregnant. Inspector Imran Shahid, who is also Sona's ex-boyfriend, visits her house to collect evidence against Joy in a serial killing case. Sona thinks Imran is just trying to frame Joy to take revenge on him for taking away his love.

The serial killing case is that of six girls who went missing; their bodies were found in an isolated house owned by Joy. All the victims were unmarried and pregnant and were then aborted and dismembered. Joy, a gynaecologist, is arrested and the town's people lose respect for him. Sona, who firmly believes that Joy is innocent and framed by Imran, visits Joy in prison, and Joy tells her to ask a famous lawyer Mr. Rastogi for help, whom he had saved before. Joy's bail application is rejected by the court for all found evidence is against Joy. Rastogi suggests that Sona prove Joy's innocence by killing one more girl in the same way the previous six were killed to prove that the killer is not Joy.

Sona is a kind person and unwilling to hurt anyone but finally agrees after she is convinced that there's no other way to prove Joy's innocence. She chooses her neighbor Anushka Tiwari, an unmarried pregnant girl. News of Anushka's death reaches police, making the court believe Joy is not the killer. He is granted bail.

After Joy returns home, Sona shows him Anushka, who is still held captive by her. didn't actually kill her, but found an unclaimed body and dressed it up to make it look like Anushka's body. Meanwhile, Anushka's boyfriend Sid follows them and finds that Anushka is actually alive in the basement of Joy's clinic. Sid tries to free her but accidentally locks himself in the cupboard.

Sona wakes up in the night to find Joy missing. She drives to the clinic immediately to find Joy about to kill Anushka. Sona now realizes that he is indeed the killer of the six girls. Joy revealed his mother got pregnant with him out of wedlock and abandoned him. Ever since Joy hates girls who gets pregnant out of wedlock that's why he abort and dismember them. Sona tries to save Anushka but Joy pins her hand on the table with his scalpel. Sid is also tied up by Joy, but he manages to contact Imran, who immediately arrives, only to be tied by Joy too. Joy is now going to abort and dismember Anushka right in front of them. Imran manages to free himself and Sona, who gets Sid and Anushka to escape. During his attempt to kill Anushka, Joy accidentally stabs Sona after she throws herself in front of Sid and Anushka. Imran stabs Joy from behind, presumably killing him.

Sona wakes up in hospital with Imran beside her and learns she has lost her baby. He tells her that Anushka is not going to file a case against her because she saved her life. Joy is also saved by the doctor and alive, but escapes from the hospital before anyone is aware. Rastogi, who is now revealed to have known Joy's crime already, and possibly had a role in those killings, meets Joy and gives him shelter.

== Cast ==
- Jacqueline Fernandez as Sona Mukerjee
- Manoj Bajpayee as Dr. Mrityunjoy "Joy/Mrityu" Mukerjee
- Mohit Raina as Inspector Imran Shahid
- Zayn Marie Khan as Anushka Tiwari
- Darshan Jariwala as Brij Rastogi
- Chanda Joshi as Mrs. Rastogi
- Deepak Arora as Sid, Anushka's boyfriend
- Vipul Deshpande as Prison Official

== Release ==
The film was released on Netflix on 1 May 2020, coinciding with May Day.

== Reception ==
On the review aggregator website Rotten Tomatoes, 15% of 13 critics' reviews are positive, with an average rating of 4.3/10.

Shubhra Gupta in her zero-star review for The Indian Express stated, "Nothing, not Fernandez in her perfectly coiffed curls, nor Raina trying very hard to appear as if he knows what’s going on, nor the sundry others who come and go, help. Nor, I’m forced to regretfully report, Bajpayee, who should have known better." Rohan Naahar of Hindustan Times said, "Not only does it disrespect your intelligence, it pretends --for a brief time towards the end -- that it has been in on the joke all along. It has none of the tongue-in-cheek chuckles that producer Farah Khan’s Main Hoon Na did, but is, instead, a strong contender for one of the worst films of 2020."

Jonathon Wilson of Ready steady Cut gave the film 3 out of 5 saying, "A genuinely compelling premise makes Mrs. Serial Killer (Netflix) a much better showcase for Jacqueline Fernandez than the woeful Drive."
