= Dacoit: A Love Story =

2026 Indian film by Shaneil Deo

- Theatrical release poster in Telugu
- Directed by: Shaneil Deo
- Screenplay by: Adivi Sesh; Shaneil Deo
- Additional screenplay: Kaarthikeya Kalakota
- Dialogues by: Abburi Ravi (Telugu); Yash Eshwari (Hindi)
- Story by: Adivi Sesh; Shaneil Deo
- Produced by: Supriya Yarlagadda; Suniel Narang
- Starring: Adivi Sesh; Mrunal Thakur; Anurag Kashyap
- Cinematography: Danush Bhaskar
- Edited by: Kodati Pavan Kalyan
- Music by: Songs: Bheems Ceciroleo; Score: Gyaani; S. Anant Srikar
- Production companies: Annapurna Studios (presenters); S. S. Creations; Suniel Narang Production
- Distributed by: Moksha Movies; Think Studios
- Release date: 10 April 2026
- Running time: 152 minutes
- Country: India
- Languages: Telugu; Hindi
- Budget: ₹65–100 crore
- Box office: ₹55.23 crore

Dacoit: A Love Story (Note: Also titled Dacoit: Oka Prema Katha in Telugu and Dacoit: Ek Prem Katha in Hindi.) is a 2026 Indian romantic action drama film directed by Shaneil Deo in his directorial debut, who co-wrote the film with Adivi Sesh. Produced by Supriya Yarlagadda under Annapurna Studios, the film was shot simultaneously in Telugu and Hindi. The film stars Sesh and Mrunal Thakur in the lead roles, with Anurag Kashyap, Prakash Raj, Sunil, Zayn Marie Khan and Atul Kulkarni in supporting roles. It was released theatrically on 10 April 2026 to mixed reviews from critics. The film underperformed at the box office.

== Plot ==
In 2021, during COVID-19, K. Haridas "Hari", a Dalit convict hailing from Hindupuram, escapes from Kadapa Central Jail with the help of his ex-cellmate, Ishaq Bhai, to exact revenge against Saraswati, alias "Juliet", his ex-girlfriend who double-crossed him to the police for killing her elder brother, Ramesh, and raping his friend and landlord, Malli, falsely. SI S. Janaki is tasked with catching Hari, but he holds her at knifepoint and escapes. He reaches Ishaq's den, where he asks Hari to steal ₹70 lakhs to send him to Dubai from Mumbai, as he is declared wanted by the police. Janaki later asks the assistance of her father, CI D. Rambabu (who is Ayyappa's Mandala Deeksha, so he addresses all of them and all addresses him as "Swamy"), for help in the case.

Before his task, he goes to Hindupuram to confront Juliet and sees her rushing her daughter, Chinni, to Karuna Hospitals, where her husband awaits a costly heart transplant. There, he discovers the hospital staff extorting patients by exploiting the pandemic and learns Juliet’s husband’s donor has sold himself to another patient for more money. Exposing the corruption, he persuades Juliet to help him as a getaway driver in robbing Karuna Hospitals. With the support of an insider, they hold CEO Solomon Reddy hostage, but the plan fails when Reddy’s men intervene, leading to a high-speed chase which garners Swamy and his assistant Prasad's attention. Swamy discerns that Solomon was transporting money by using the pandemic illegally but is forced to leave him scot-free due to lack of evidence, and vows to prove his crimes within 48 hours.

However, Hari and Juliet manage to rob another stash of money from another branch of the hospital and flee; they are cornered by Swamy, forcing Hari to flee to protect Juliet's cover. Swamy and Janaki investigate Hari’s past through Malli, discovering Bhaskar had secretly photographed Hari and Juliet; confronted by Malli, Bhaskar provoked Ramesh, which led to an argument. That night, Ramesh and Bhaskar attacked Hari at Malli’s house; Ramesh attempted to assault Malli, but Hari fought back and killed him in a state of exhalation. Bhaskar secretly called his uncle, a CI, and coerced Malli into falsely accusing Hari of rape and drove her out of the village. To protect Hari from an encounter orchestrated by Bhaskar, Juliet reluctantly claimed he was guilty, by bowing to her family’s demands and contemplating suicide.

Later, Hari finds Chinni's locket he gifted to Juliet and confronts Bhaskar in the ICU ward about his crimes and attempts to strangle him but spares him at the last minute when he reveals that Juliet was the one requiring a heart transplant; he was diagnosed with black lung for 2 months along with her due to the pandemic. Hari goes to Juliet's friend's, Shanti's house, and learns that Juliet went to rob her own money from another branch of Karuna hospitals in Bengaluru to pay for an illegal heart transplant before 9AM. Prasad, revealed to be on Solomon's payroll, kills Ishaq and his aide Ravi and takes the money to be given to Solomon. He corners Juliet at the hospital and is about to kill her, when Hari kills him and escapes with the money and Juliet. They are cornered at the border by the police; Juliet escapes with the money, leaving Hari to fend off the cops. Swamy and Janaki defuse the situation and try to convince Hari to surrender, but he sacrifices himself and requests Swamy to take care of Juliet and Chinni in his dying moments, while Juliet's heart transplant becomes successful.

One month later, Solomon's crimes are exposed, resulting in his arrest and the shutdown of his hospital chain. Bhaskar, having been cured, enjoys Chinni's birthday. Swamy and Janaki arrive and reveal Bhaskar's deception to Juliet, who hangs a photo of her and Hari before lashing out at Bhaskar in front of the guests and leaves him. Swamy later reveals to Janaki that the heart transplanted into Juliet belonged to Hari, as his blood group matched with Juliet. She finds out that the dollar from Chinni's locket, which Hari gave, contained an engagement ring in it. Elated, she wears it as a mark of their love.

== Cast ==
- Adivi Sesh as K. Haridas "Hari"
- Mrunal Thakur as Saraswati alias "Juliet" (Voice dubbed by Chinmayi in Telugu)
- Anurag Kashyap as CI Rambabu alias "Swamy"
- Prakash Raj as Solomon Reddy, CEO and MD of Karuna Hospitals
- Sunil as SI Prasad, Swamy’s assistant
- Atul Kulkarni as Ishaaq Bhai, Hari’s ex-cellmate and friend
- Zayn Marie Khan as SI S. Janaki, Swamy’s daughter
- Kamakshi Bhaskarla as Malli, Hari’s landlord and sister figure
- Vaibhav Tatwawadi as Bhaskar, Saraswati's husband
- Jhansi as Shanti, Saraswati's friend
- Zarina Wahab as Saraswati's mother
- Vamsee Aloor as Ramesh, Saraswati's brother
- Anam Kaur as Chinni, Saraswati and Bhaskar’s daughter
- Sunaina as Manga, Hospital worker
- Pawan Singh, cameo appearance in "Chichubuddi" (Telugu) / "Touch Buddy" (Hindi)
- Jonita Gandhi, as Rani, cameo appearance in "Chichubuddi" (Telugu) / "Touch Buddy" (Hindi)

== Production ==
=== Development ===
The film marks the directorial debut of Shaneil Deo, who previously worked as a cinematographer. Adivi Sesh and Deo co-wrote the script over two years, aiming for a "neo-Western" aesthetic reminiscent of films like Sholay and The Magnificent Seven. The story follows a man wrongfully convicted of a crime who escapes prison to seek vengeance.

=== Casting ===
In December 2024, Adivi Sesh pitched a role to Anurag Kashyap at the wedding of Naga Chaitanya and Sobhita Dhulipala in Hyderabad [10]. Kashyap, making his acting debut in Telugu cinema, also assisted the team in writing the Hindi dialogues for the film. Shruti Haasan was initially considered for the female lead but was replaced by Mrunal Thakur due to creative differences.

=== Filming ===
Principal photography was primarily conducted in North India and the deserts of Rajasthan to capture the Western theme. Filming was completed in March 2026, followed by a wrap party in Hyderabad.

== Music ==
The music was composed by Bheems Ceciroleo. The audio rights were acquired by Sony Music India for ₹8 crores. The first single, a romantic track titled "Rubaroo", was released in February 2026. A cross-cultural track titled "Touch Buddy", featuring Pawan Singh and Jonita Gandhi, was launched in Gorakhpur on 28 March 2026.

== Release ==
=== Theatrical ===
The film was originally scheduled for a March 19, 2026, release to coincide with the Ugadi, Gudi Padwa and Eid festivals [2].⁣ However, it was postponed to 10 April 2026 to avoid a box-office clash with Dhurandhar 2 [17]. The film released worldwide theatrically on April 10, 2026.

=== Home media ===
The post-theatrical streaming rights were acquired by Amazon Prime Video [18]. The film began streaming on the platform from 8 May 2026 in Telugu and dubbed versions of Tamil, Malayalam and Kannada languages.

== Reception ==
On the review aggregator website Rotten Tomatoes, 23% of 13 critics' reviews are positive, with an average rating of 5/10.

Yashaswini Sri of The Indian Express gave the film 3.5/5 stars and noted that it earns its emotional punches slowly rather than announcing them early. Devesh Sharma of Filmfare gave the film 3/5 stars and said that it is a film of "compelling beginnings and uneven resolutions. It sets out to explore the fragile boundary between love and vengeance with emotional sincerity, and for a time, it succeeds. Yet, in its pursuit of narrative complexity and spectacle, it loses sight of the intimacy that once defined it." Simran Singh of Daily News and Analysis gave it 3/5 stars, writing that the film is "certainly an engaging, entertaining watch, and the credit goes to smart writing, giving a new spin to a mundane love story." Sangeetha Devi Dundoo of The Hindu wrote that the screenplay packed the film with "layered, often complex characters. Threads of possible deceit and double-crossing keep the narrative engaging at key moments. While a few characters verge on being one-note, the complexity of the central figures ultimately works in the film’s favour."

T Maruthi Acharya of India Today rated 2.5/5 stars and wrote that "The first half earns your attention, the second half spends it unevenly, and you leave the theatre thinking about what it could have been rather than what it was." Mayank Shekhar of Mid-Day rated 2/5 stars and wrote that "I've spent more time wondering about what was going through the filmmakers' heads, rather than what's in the film!" Aishani Biswas of Outlook India rated it 1.5/5 stars and wrote that the film is "weighed down by ambition, where strong themes fail to find a convincing story."
