= Kriti (film) =

2016 Indian film

- Directed by: Shirish Kunder
- Produced by: Muvizz.com
- Starring: Manoj Bajpayee; Radhika Apte; Neha Sharma; Manu Rishi
- Cinematography: Manush Nandan
- Edited by: Shirish Kunder
- Music by: Shirish Kunder
- Distributed by: muvizz.com
- Release date: 22 June 2016
- Running time: 18 minutes and 50 seconds
- Country: India
- Language: Hindi

Kriti is a 2016 Indian Hindi-language short film directed by Shirish Kunder and produced by Muvizz.com. Hosted on YouTube, the film is a psychological thriller that stars Manoj Bajpayee, Radhika Apte and Neha Sharma as the main characters and was released on 22 June 2016. It has been dubbed a "dark drama".

== Cast ==
- Manoj Bajpayee as Sapan
- Radhika Apte as Dr. Kalpana
- Neha Sharma as Kriti
- Manu Rishi as Srijan Rane

== Controversy ==
Soon after the release of the filmvon YouTube, the movie ran into controversy after a young filmmaker from Nepal, Aneel Neupane claimed the movie was a copy of his short film Bob released on Vimeo in October 2015 privately among friend and family circle. The incident developed into an ugly affair of claims and counterclaims with both the films being removed from YouTube. Kriti is now back on YouTube about three weeks after it was pulled down for violating said claim and Bob is back as well on YouTube. Another short named DAZED also got into fight which had the similar storyline and was released on March 13, 2015, even before the both movies.
