= Gnani Sankaran =

Indian journalist and writer (1954–2018)

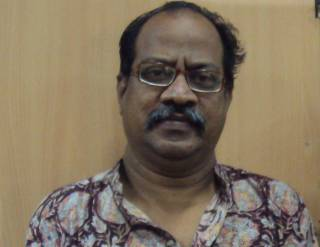
- Born: N. Vembusamy Sankaran; 4 January 1954; Chengalpattu, Madras State (now Tamil Nadu), India
- Died: 15 January 2018 (aged 64); Chennai, India
- Occupations: Journalist, writer
- Spouse: Padmavathi
- Children: Manush Nandan
- Writing career
- Subjects: Society, culture, politics

N. Vembusamy Sankaran (4 January 1954 – 15 January 2018), known popularly as Gnani, was an Indian journalist and writer in Tamil language. He wrote articles under the pseudonyms Vamban, Cynic and Nandan, and is known for frank and uncompromising views on politics and culture, which he has expressed in the media for 30 years. He functioned in multiple roles in newspapers, magazines, plays and films. His son Manush Nandan works as a cinematographer in Tamil cinema.

== Early life ==
Gnani was born to Jayalakshmi and N. Vembusamy on 4 January 1954 in Chengalpattu, a town in India's erstwhile Madras State (now Tamil Nadu), where he was also schooled. His father worked as a journalist with an English daily. As a student Gnani showed interest in oratory, writing and acting. He was a part of first Rail Passenger's Association. He graduated from the Madras Christian College.

== Career ==
He started as court reporter for Indian Express, when he reported on embarrassing gaffes for the judiciary. Eventually he fought with Indian Express. Although he was fired, he successfully sued them for breach of labour laws. He soon joined eminent Tamil magazine Ananda Vikatan, becoming a sure investigative journalist.

He soon became editor of his own magazines. He reported on Madras Atomic Power Plant, drawing CBI sleuths who looked for his source.

Gnani was the editor of a Tamil magazine Dheemtharikida, which was first published in printed form and then in electronic form. Now his official website www.gnani.net launched on 2 October 2008 contains "o pakkangal" which he is currently writing on Kalki, updated everyweek. It also contains some of old dheemtharikida articles and the others he wrote on the year 2010 as well as info about all his areas of activities - theatre, video, print etc.

== Death ==
On 15 January 2018, Gnani died suddenly at 12.30 am at his home in KK Nagar, Chennai at the age of 64. It is said that he had been suffering from kidney ailments for a few years and had been undergoing regular dialysis. His sudden demise has shocked journalists, writers and activists in Tamil Nadu. Tributes have been pouring in online from readers and colleagues. His body was donated to Rajiv Gandhi Government General Hospital-Medical College.

== Books ==
- Balloon (Play)
- Pazhaya Paper (collection of his articles)
- Marupadiyum (collection of his articles)
- Media UravugaL
- Samoogappaalinam: Mediavum Kalviyum
- keLvigaL (Interviews of cult figures between 1982 and 2003)
- Manithan PathilgaL (Answers for the readers’ questions in Dinamani Kathir between 1996 and 1999)
- Kandathai SolgirEn (Collection of articles published in India Today)
- En sankara madaththai kaappaatra vEndum?
- oozhalE un vEr engE?
- Thavippu
- aappiL dhEsam (Travelogue series published in dinamani kathir a Sunday magazine)

== Television ==
- Thik thik thik- suntv as serial killer
- Vinnilirunthu Mannukku
- Picknik
- vErgaL-Viduthalai pOraattamum pennurimai iyakkamum
- Iyya-periyaar – E.Ve.Raa's life story
- Malara thudikkum mottukkal (Doordarshan)

== Plays ==
- More than 30 plays for the troupe Pareeksha
- Kolam - A Mission towards Meaningful cinema

To promote humane values and clean entertainment in the fields of arts and literature, by producing works of art and literature.

== Magazines ==
=== Columns ===
- He was writing the column "O Pakkangal" in the magazine "Kalki" (earlier in Ananda Vikatan & Kumudam). It gained great popularity among the Tamil readers. The "O PakkangaL" has been released in two books from "Vikatan Publications" and is a bestseller.
- He was also writing the column "Neruppu MalargaL" in AvaL Vikatan (a Tamil magazine for women). The column has been published in book form from Vikatan Publication.
- Because of some controversies, he opted out off Anantha Vikatan, was writing articles under the same title in Kumudam for a brief period. Owing to problems (reasons unknown),'O Pakkangal' in now a part of Kalki, another popular Tamil Magazine.

=== Contributions ===
Gnani contributed his thoughts in the following periodicals and still writing to many periodicals.

- Indian Express
- Junior Vikatan
- Junior Post
- Murasoli
- Ethiroli
- Dinamani
- Chutti Vikatan
- Aval Vikatan
- Ananda Vikatan
- Kumudam
- Kalki Magazine

== See also ==
- List of Indian writers
