= Om Shanti Om (soundtrack) =

Soundtrack album by Vishal–Shekhar
- Released: 18 September 2007
- Recorded: 15 August 2007 – 10 September 2007
- Studio: T-Series
- Genre: Feature film soundtrack
- Length: 61:18
- Label: T-Series
- Producer: Jackie Vanjari

Om Shanti Om is the soundtrack to the 2007 film of the same name directed by Farah Khan, produced by Gauri Khan through Red Chillies Entertainment and starred Shah Rukh Khan, Shreyas Talpade, Arjun Rampal and Deepika Padukone (in her Hindi film debut). The film's soundtrack featured six original songs, four remixes and an instrumental track, all of them were composed by Vishal–Shekhar, and written by Javed Akhtar, except for one song composed by Pyarelal of the Laxmikant–Pyarelal duo, which was arranged by the duo themselves; Vishal Dadlani guest-wrote the song "Ajab Si", while Kumaar wrote the Punjabi portions of "Jag Soona Soona Lage". The soundtrack was released by T-Series on 18 September 2007 to critical acclaim and was one of the highest-selling music albums of the year.

To date, this was the last time singers Udit Narayan and Abhijeet Bhattacharya provided their voices as playback singers to Shah Rukh Khan. The two were synonymous as a singer-actor combo for many of his previous films.

== Development and release ==
A. R. Rahman was initially signed in to compose music for the film but he opted out after disagreements with T-Series as he wanted them to share the copyrights of music between him and the label. Later Vishal–Shekhar was hired to score music for the film, in their maiden collaboration with both Shah Rukh and Farah. The duo had composed for few television advertisements directed by Farah, and with her rapport, they had been recommended to Red Chillies Entertainment for their recruitment as composers.

The duo recalled that they grew up listening to music of the 1960s and 1970s and wanted the soundtrack to be a tribute to the music of that particular era while appealing to newer audiences at the same time. The song "Dhoom Taana" was composed by Pyarelal of the Laxmikant–Pyarelal duo. Pyarelal stopped composing after his partner Laxmikant's death in May 1998, but owing to Farah Khan's request on composing a song as a tribute to Hindi film music of the 1970s and 1980s, he agreed at the insistence of his wife and daughter. The song was recorded with a 150-member-orchestra and traditional instruments like drums, tabla, dholak and dafli, which was a trademark of the duo and more than 40 different percussion instruments had been used. Vishal–Shekhar also helped Pyarelal on orchestrating and arranging the tunes for the song.

== Reception ==
Joginder Tuteja's review for Bollywood Hungama summarised the music as "one of the complete scores" from Vishal–Shekhar, giving four stars out of five. Sukanya Verma of Rediff.com also gave it four stars out of five, with praise for the music, but criticised the "Dark Side" mix. Writing for AllMusic, Bhaskar Gupta gave the album four-and-a-half stars out of five, summarizing "Vishal-Shekhar finally delivered a soundtrack that could be deemed their signature offering."

== Sales and records ==
Vishal–Shekhar who were judges at the Sa Re Ga Ma Pa Challenge 2007 reality show has given an interview to Rediff.com, recalled that Himesh Reshammiya (fellow composer and one of the judges) had said that the album as well as the film would be commercially successful even before release. It was the highest-selling music album of the year in India, with sales of around 2 million units.

== Track listing ==
Om Shanti Om (Original Motion Picture Soundtrack)
No.	Title	Lyrics	Singer(s)	Length
1.	"Ajab Si"	Vishal Dadlani	KK	4:03
2.	"Dard-e-Disco"	Javed Akhtar	Sukhwinder Singh, Caralisa Monteiro, Nisha, Marianne	4:31
3.	"Deewangi Deewangi"	Javed Akhtar	Shaan, Udit Narayan, Shreya Ghoshal, Sunidhi Chauhan, Rahul Saxena	5:53
4.	"Main Agar Kahoon"	Javed Akhtar	Sonu Nigam, Shreya Ghoshal	5:10
5.	"Jag Soona Soona Lage"	Kumaar	Rahat Fateh Ali Khan, Richa Sharma	5:31
6.	"Dhoom Taana"	Javed Akhtar	Abhijeet Bhattacharya, Shreya Ghoshal	6:15
7.	"Dastaan-E-Om Shanti Om"	Javed Akhtar	Shaan	7:08
8.	"Dard-E-Disco" (Remix by DJ Aqeel and Just a Gent)	Javed Akhtar	Sukhwinder Singh, Caralisa Monteiro, Nisha, Marianne	4:38
9.	"Deewangi Deewangi" ((Rainbow Mix) Remix by DJ G, Kiran Kamath)	Javed Akhtar	Shaan, Udit Narayan, Shreya Ghoshal, Sunidhi Chauhan, Rahul Saxena	4:48
10.	"Om Shanti Om" (Medley Mix by Jackie V)	Javed Akhtar	Sukhwinder Singh, Caralisa Monteiro, Nisha, Marianne, Shaan, Udit Narayan, Shreya Ghoshal, Sunidhi Chauhan, Rahul Saxena, Abhijeet Bhattacharya	6:06
11.	"Dastaan-E-Om Shanti Om" (The Dark Side Mix remix by Zoheb, DJ Nikhil, Chinappa, DJ Nawed, DJ Snake)	Javed Akhtar	Shaan	6:21
Total length:				61:18

== Accolades ==
Award	Date of ceremony (Note: Date is linked to the article about the awards held that year, wherever possible.)	Category	Recipient(s) and nominee(s)	Result	Ref.
Asian Film Awards	17 March 2008	Best Composer	Vishal–Shekhar	Won	
Filmfare Awards	16 February 2008	Best Music Director	Vishal–Shekhar	Nominated	
Filmfare Awards	16 February 2008	Best Lyricist	Javed Akhtar for "Main Agar Kahoon"	Nominated	
Filmfare Awards	16 February 2008	Best Lyricist	Vishal Dadlani for "Ajab Si"	Nominated	
Filmfare Awards	16 February 2008	Best Playback Singer	KK for "Ajab Si"	Nominated	
Filmfare Awards	16 February 2008	Best Playback Singer	Sonu Nigam for "Main Agar Kahoon"	Nominated	
International Indian Film Academy Awards	6–8 June 2008	Best Lyricist	Javed Akhtar for "Main Agar Kahoon"	Won	
Producers Guild Film Awards	30 March 2008	Best Music Director	Vishal–Shekhar	Nominated	
Producers Guild Film Awards	30 March 2008	Best Lyricist	Vishal Dadlani for "Ajab Si"	Nominated	
Producers Guild Film Awards	30 March 2008	Best Male Playback Singer	KK for "Ajab Si"	Nominated	
Producers Guild Film Awards	30 March 2008	Best Re-Recording	Kuldeep Sood	Nominated	
Screen Awards	23 January 2008	Best Male Playback Singer	KK for "Ajab Si"	Nominated	
Screen Awards	23 January 2008	Best Background Music	Vishal–Shekhar	Nominated	
Zee Cine Awards	26 April 2008	Best Music Director	Vishal–Shekhar	Nominated	
Zee Cine Awards	26 April 2008	Best Lyricist	Javed Akhtar for "Main Agar Kahoon"	Nominated	
Zee Cine Awards	26 April 2008	Best Male Playback Singer	KK for "Ajab Si"	Nominated	
Zee Cine Awards	26 April 2008	Best Male Playback Singer	Sonu Nigam for "Main Agar Kahoon"	Nominated	
Zee Cine Awards	26 April 2008	Most Popular Track of the Year	"Dard-e-Disco"	Nominated	
