= Joker (2012 film) =

2012 film by Shirish Kunder

- Directed by: Shirish Kunder
- Written by: Shirish Kunder
- Produced by: Farah Khan; Cape of Good Films
- Starring: Akshay Kumar; Sonakshi Sinha; Minissha Lamba; Shreyas Talpade
- Cinematography: Sudeep Chatterjee
- Edited by: Shirish Kunder
- Music by: Songs: G. V. Prakash Kumar; Guest Composer: Gaurav Dagaonkar; Score: Shirish Kunder
- Production companies: Hari Om Entertainment; Three's Company Productions
- Distributed by: UTV Motion Pictures
- Release date: 31 August 2012
- Running time: 103 minutes
- Country: India
- Language: Hindi
- Budget: ₹47 crore
- Box office: est. ₹22.51 crore

Joker is a 2012 Indian Hindi-language science fiction comedy film written and directed by Shirish Kunder in his second directorial venture after Jaan-E-Mann. The film stars Akshay Kumar and Sonakshi Sinha. The film was released worldwide on 31 August 2012 to negative reviews and was a disaster at the box office.

== Plot ==
Agastya "Sattu" is a scientist working on developing a communication system to communicate with aliens. However, he loses the faith of his seniors and is given a one-month deadline to conclude his project with substantial results.

In the meantime, Agastya is informed by his girlfriend Diva about his father's illness. On hearing this, they both reach his native village, Paglapur, whose colourful inhabitants include his brother, who speaks gibberish; a child who thinks he is a lamppost; and others who thinks World War II is still ongoing and fears the Germans.

Soon after arriving, Agastya finds that his father had called him on a false pretext of illness. The villagers called Agastya so he could make Paglapur a better place and connect it with the outside world.

Upon learning the truth, Agastya decides to move back to the US; however, after hearing the plight of the inhabitants of Paglapur, who the government ignores because the village is absent from the demarcated map of India, he decides to devise a solution to the problem.

As the story continues, Agastya comes up with a quaint idea involving a crop circle and the arrival of aliens to bring recognition for his otherwise isolated village undergoing a plight of neglect since independence.

With frames moving ahead, Agastya, along with other villagers, creates a crop circle in Paglapur and spreads rumors about the arrival of aliens in the village. This leads to media frenzy and some hilarious events involving UFOs and fictitious man-made aliens.

In the end, the joke about the fake aliens is found out, and real aliens come and give the village the gift of oil.

== Cast ==
- Akshay Kumar as Agastya "Sattu" / Rajkumar (Joker)
- Sonakshi Sinha as Diva
- Shreyas Talpade as Babban
- Minissha Lamba as Aanya
- Gurpreet Ghuggi as Bobby
- Darshan Jariwala as Baba (Agastya's father)
- Asrani as Guruji
- Sanjay Mishra as Rajaji
- Vindu Dara Singh as Sundi
- Pitobash as Kachua
- Alexx ONell as Simon
- Chitrangda Singh as a village dancer in the item song "Kafirana"
- Vrajesh Hirjee as villager
- Aarya Babbar as Majnu Tangewala (cameo)
- Kanchan Pagare as Uttam Pradesh Minister PA

== Production ==
=== Development ===
Shirish Kunder had the project in development for several years before finding financial backing and hit films, and had to negotiate for use of the specific title which Kunder stated is important to the script itself. The film is being produced by Farah Khan, Shirish Kunder, and Akshay Kumar under the banner of Three's Company and Hari Om Entertainment. The film was shot in 3D using 3D cameras, however in June 2012, it was announced that the film was no longer in 3D, since Ra.One and Don 2 have taken the goals, if Joker flopped it would be a loss on the whole crew, therefore the film will only be released in 2D format. According to director, Shirish Kunder, "It is an underdog story about how individuals make it big in life and in the process, get help from aliens from a fictional planet". Shreyas Talpade will play Akshay's brother in the film. Female lead opposite to Shreyas will be played by Minisha Lamba, who will enact the role of an innocent TV reporter. Sonakshi will also perform an item number in the film. American actor Alexx ONell was also signed to play a role in the film.

=== Filming ===
The first schedule of shooting was initially slated to take place in Ludhiana, however the location was changed to Chandigarh. The shooting began on 14 February 2011 in Chandigarh. The crew finished the 19-day schedule on 12 March 2011, finishing 40% of the production work. The second schedule started on 17 May 2011 in Mumbai and concluded in June 2011.

== Music ==
Joker

Soundtrack album by G. V. Prakash Kumar
- Released: 27 July 2012
- Recorded: 2011
- Genre: Film soundtrack
- Language: Hindi
- Label: Sony Music India
- Producer: G. V. Prakash Kumar

G. V. Prakash Kumar chronology
| Saguni (2012) | Joker (2012) | Thaandavam (2012) |

All songs featured in the film, except one, are composed by G. V. Prakash Kumar in his Hindi film composing debut. The song "Jugnu Banke Tu" sung by Udit Narayan was highly appreciated among all songs.

All lyrics are written by Shirish Kunder.

Track list
| No. | Title | Music | Singer(s) | Length |
|---|---|---|---|---|
| 1. | "Kafirana" | Gaurav Dagaonkar | Sunidhi Chauhan, Adarsh Shinde | 5:00 |
| 2. | "Jugnu" | G. V. Prakash Kumar | Udit Narayan, Kavita Krishnamurthy | 4:10 |
| 3. | "Sing Raja" | G. V. Prakash Kumar | Daler Mehndi, Sonu Kakkar | 3:50 |
| 4. | "Yeh Joker" | G. V. Prakash Kumar | Sonu Nigam | 4:40 |
| 5. | "Tears of Joker" | G. V. Prakash Kumar | Instrumental | 3:20 |
| 6. | "Alien Arrival" | G. V. Prakash Kumar | Instrumental | 2:48 |

=== Audio review ===
Music Aloud said: "He may or may not have composed the tunes for the controversy-ridden soundtrack of Jaan-E-Mann, but when GV Prakash Kumar actually got to do a credited debut in Bollywood, it turned out to be a rather uninventive one" and rated it 5/10. Score Magazine, gave it 2 out of 5 stars stating, "You know something is wrong with an album when the instrumental tracks immensely outshine the vocal tracks. I must mention that each of the songs has a strong underlying melody but gross injustice is done to them by Shirish Kunder's lyrics."

== Reception ==
Joker received negative reviews from critics. On the review aggregator website Rotten Tomatoes, 0% of 6 critics' reviews are positive, with an average rating of 2/10.

Soumyadipta Banerjee of In.com gave 0.5 out of 5 stars and said "Not only that the aliens are weird, the whole movie seems be in some weird planet after a point of time". Saibal Chatterjee of NDTV gave the film 1 out of 5 stars and wrote, "Joker is a crude joke of a film that will leave you in tears unless you have a stomach strong enough to digest such unmitigated junk." Film critic Taran Adarsh also gave it 1 out of 5 stars and labelled it as a complete "disaster" and a "joke of a film".

== Accolades ==
| Award | Category | Recipient | Result | Notes |
|---|---|---|---|---|
| Golden Kela Awards | Worst Actress | Sonakshi Sinha | Won | Also for Rowdy Rathore, Dabangg 2 and Son of Sardaar |
| Golden Kela Awards | Worst Film | Shirish Kunder | Won | |
