= Illegal - Justice, Out of Order =

Indian Web series

- Created by: Sahir Raza
- Written by: Reeshu Nath
- Starring: Neha Sharma; Akshay Oberoi; Kubbra Sait; Piyush Mishra; Satyadeep Mishra; Tanuj Virwani; Ankit Gupta
- Composer: Nirmal Pandya
- Country of origin: India
- Original languages: Hindi; English
- No. of seasons: 3
- No. of episodes: 26

Production
- Executive producer: Sameer Khan
- Editors: Jay B Ghadiali; Geeta Singh
- Camera setup: Azeez Siddiqui
- Running time: 30 – 35 Minute

Original release
- Network: Voot (Season 1 & 2); JioCinema (Season 3)
- Release: 12 May 2020

Illegal - Justice, Out of Order is an Indian legal thriller web series directed by Sahir Raza, starring Neha Sharma, Akshay Oberoi, Kubbra Sait, Piyush Mishra and Satyadeep Mishra. A courtroom drama where an idealistic lawyer finds herself trapped in the murky world of criminal law. The web series premiered on Voot on 12 May 2020.

== Plot ==
The plot revolves around Niharika Singh who is a lawyer and is hired by a renowned law firm which is run by Janardhan Jaitley. Throughout the series, Niharika makes several shocking revelations. She is forced to work on other cases as opposed to the one she was hired for, which revolved around rape and sexual harassment charges.

== Cast ==
- Neha Sharma as Niharika Singh
- Akshay Oberoi as Akshay Jaitley
- Kubbra Sait as Maher Salam
- Piyush Mishra as Janardhan Jaitley "JJ"
- Tanuj Virwani as Raghav (Season 2)
- Satyadeep Mishra as Puneet Tandon
- Ankit Gupta as Neeraj
- Nabeel Ahmed as Manav Mehta
- Deepak Tijori as Niharika's father
- Karmveer Choudhary as DCP Ravi Pandit
- Kriti Vij as Sue, Nijharika's friend
- Parul Gulati Devika, Devika Jaitley
- Sonnalli Seygall as Simone Kalra
- Naresh Gosain as Session Court Judge
- Khushboo Atre as Female Constable 1
- Manish Dallvi as Bakhtiyar - Parsi Client
- Zayn Marie Khan as Zoya Ahmed (Season 3)

== Release ==
The web series premiered on Voot on 12 May 2020.

Illegal - Justice, Out of Order Season 2 is live now on Voot. Released on 25 November 2021.

== Critical reception ==
Pallabi Dey Purkayastha from The Times Of India rated the series 3 out of 5 and overall praised the director for effectively maintaining the likeability factor of the script and its characters throughout the series but also added that the chaos and commotion is too hard to ignore at times. Jyoti Kanyal from India Today shared her critical review stating "Illegal has an appealing premise, but what goes against the show is the poor direction and writing".

Ruchi Kaushal from Hindustan Times highly praised the performance of the cast especially Neha Sharma and Kubbra Sait, and commended the director for creating such a tight knit legal drama without losing the reins of the plot or the thrill. Nandani Ramnath from Scroll.in

== List of episodes ==
- Season 1 (2020) Voot

1. The mad lawyer (12-05-2020 Tuesday) 1

2. Justice delayed, justice denied ? (12-05-2020 Tuesday) 2

3. Take the stand (12-05-2020 Tuesday) 3

4. Play or get played (12-05-2020 Tuesday) 4

5. Courting trouble (12-05-2020 Tuesday) 5

6. Two wrongs make a right (12-05-2020 Tuesday) 6

7. Innocent until proven guilty (12-05-2020 Tuesday) 7

8. When the past comes knocking (12-05-2020 Tuesday) 8

9. Plausible deniability (12-05-2020 Tuesday) 9

10. The final face off (12-05-2020 Tuesday) 10

- Season 2 (2021) Voot

1. The war is on (25-11-2021 Thursday) 11

2. Down but not out (25-2019

Thursday) 12

3. Old cases die hard (25-11-2021 Thursday) 13

4. Tricks of the trade (25-11-2021 Thursday) 14

5. The turf war (25-11-2021 Thursday) 15

6. A shark's trap (25-11-2021 Thursday) 16

7. The double cross (25-11-2021 Thursday) 17

8. Checkmate (25-11-2021 Thursday) 18

- Season 3 (2024) Jiocinema

1. The mad lawyer returns (29-05-2024 Wednesday) 19

2. Love and loss (29-05-2024 Wednesday) 20

3. Lonely at the top (29-05-2024 Wednesday) 21

4. Game on (29-05-2024 Wednesday) 22

5. Power play (29-05-2024 Wednesday) 23

6. Secrets and sacrifice (29-05-2024 Wednesday) 24

7. The tables turn (29-05-2024 Wednesday) 25

8. The burden of truth (29-05-2024 Wednesday) 26
