= Shirish Kunder =

Indian filmmaker (born 1973)

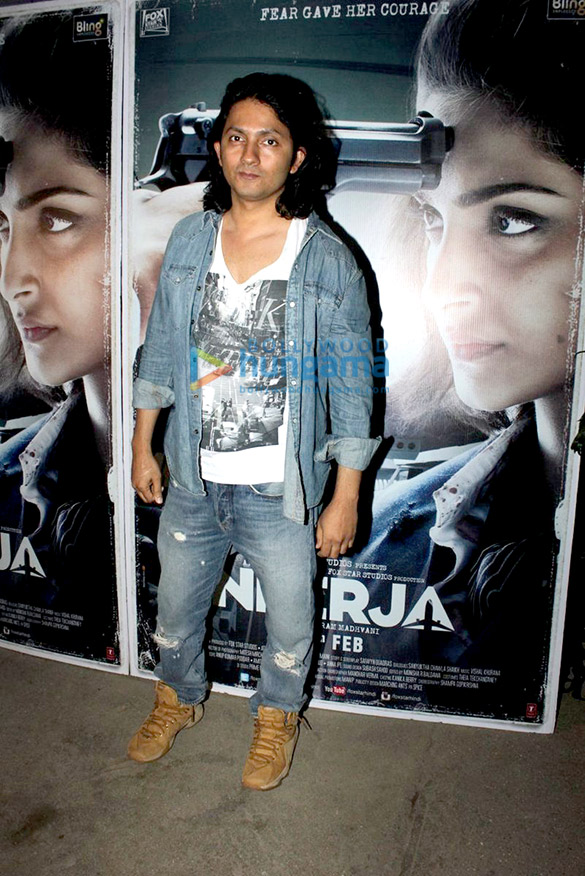
- Shirish Kunder in 2016
- Born: 24 May 1973 (age 53); Mangalore, Karnataka, India
- Occupations: Film director; editor; screenwriter; music composer
- Spouse: Farah Khan (m. 2004)
- Children: 3

Shirish Kunder (born 24 May 1973) is an Indian filmmaker and film editor. After working as an editor for several films, he made his directorial debut with Jaan-E-Mann (2006). He is married to choreographer and film director Farah Khan, whom he met while working on her 2004 film Main Hoon Na.

== Early life ==
Kunder was born on 24 May 1973 in Mangalore, Karnataka, India. He was brought up in Mumbai. He studied Electronics & Telecommunications Engineering at the SDM College of Engineering and Technology in Dharwad.

== Career ==
Kunder worked as an electronics engineer for Motorola for four years before changing profession. He worked as an editor for several films beginning with Champion (2000), a film featuring songs by Anu Malik and Anand Raj Anand, with playback singing by Shankar Sahney and Hema Sardesai. before turning to direction with Jaan-E-Mann. The film starred Salman Khan, Akshay Kumar and Preity Zinta, and was released on 20 October 2006. The film was critically acclaimed for its innovative visual narrative style.

He co-produced his wife's directorial Tees Maar Khan, alongside Twinkle Khanna and Ronnie Screwvala. Kunder had also co-written the film with his brother Ashmith Kunder and composed the title track and film score. The film starred Akshay Kumar, Katrina Kaif and Akshaye Khanna, and was released on 24 December 2010.

Kunder's third directorial venture was an 18-minute short film titled Kriti, a psychological thriller, featuring Manoj Bajpayee, Radhika Apte and Neha Sharma. It was released on YouTube on 22 June 2016.

Kunder also wrote the humour column "Shirishly Speaking" for the Indian national daily newspaper DNA between 2016 and 2017.

Kunder's fourth directorial was the Netflix Original Mrs. Serial Killer, starring Jacqueline Fernandez, Manoj Bajpayee and Mohit Raina in the main lead roles. It was released on 1 May 2020.

== Personal life ==
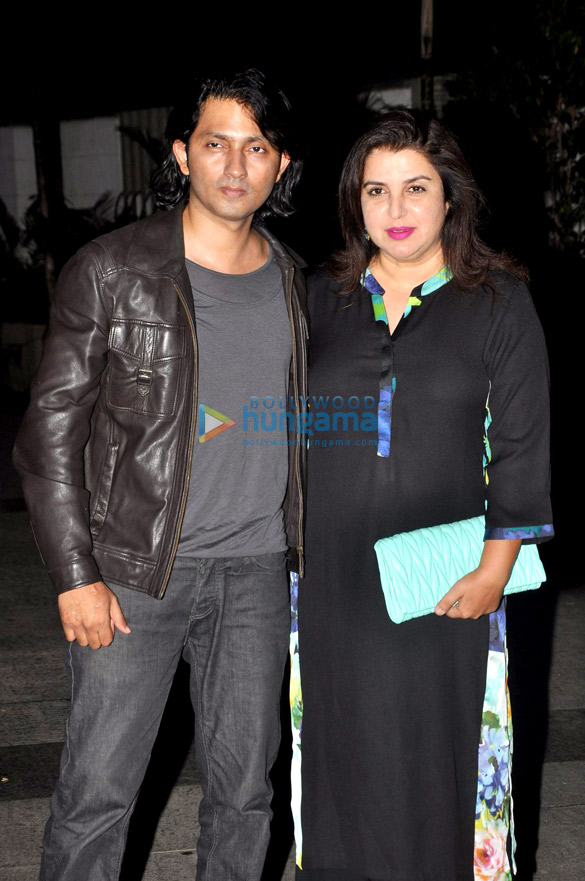
Shirish Kunder and Farah Khan in 2015

On 9 December 2004, Kunder married director and choreographer Farah Khan. She gave birth to their triplets (following an in vitro procedure) son Czar and daughters Diva and Anya, on 11 February 2008 at Mumbai's Jaslok hospital.

== Filmography ==
Year	Film	Director	Writer	Producer	Note
2006	Jaan-E-Mann	Yes	Yes	No	
2010	Tees Maar Khan	No	Yes	Yes	
2012	Joker	Yes	Yes	Yes	
2016	Kriti	Yes	Yes	No	Short film
2020	Mrs. Serial Killer	Yes	Yes	Yes	

=== Composer ===
- Jaan-E-Mann (2006)
- Tees Maar Khan (2010) - also lyricist
- Joker (2012) - also lyricist
- Kriti (2016)
- Mrs. Serial Killer (2020)

=== Editor ===
- Champion (2000)
- Yeh Raaste Hain Pyaar Ke (2001)
- Aankhen (2002)
- Koi Mere Dil Se Poochhe (2002)
- Na Tum Jaano Na Hum (2002)
- Armaan (2003)
- Calcutta Mail (2003)
- Chura Liyaa Hai Tumne (2003)
- Matrubhoomi (2003)
- Sandhya (2003)
- Main Hoon Na (2004)
- Uuf Kya Jaadoo Mohabbat Hai (2004)
- Paisa Vasool (2004)
- Socha Na Tha (2005)
- Waqt: The Race Against Time (2005)
- Benaam (2006)
- Jaan-E-Mann (2006)
- Om Shanti Om (2007)
- Tees Maar Khan (2010)
- Joker (2012)
- Kriti (2016)
- Mrs. Serial Killer (2020)

=== Sound editor ===
- Split Wide Open (1999)
