= Neha Sharma =

Indian actress (born 1987)

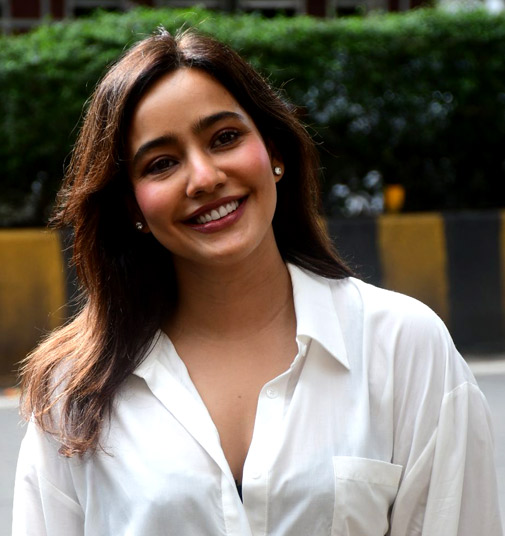
- Sharma in 2025
- Born: 21 November 1987 (age 38); Bhagalpur, Bihar, India
- Education: National Institute of Fashion Technology, New Delhi
- Occupations: Actress; model
- Years active: 2007–present
- Parent: Ajit Sharma (father)
- Relatives: Aisha Sharma (sister)

Neha Sharma (pronounced [ˈnɛːɦa ˈʃərma], born 21 November 1987) is an Indian actress who primarily works in Hindi and Telugu films. She has appeared in several films including Crook (2010), Yamla Pagla Deewana 2 (2013), Solo (2017) and Tanhaji (2020). She made her web debut with the series Illegal - Justice, Out of Order (2020) and has been part of the short films Kriti and Vikalp, where she played the titular role.

== Early life ==
Sharma was born on 21 November 1987, to a Hindu family in Bhagalpur, Bihar. She attended the Mount Carmel School, Bhagalpur and pursued a course in fashion design from the National Institute of Fashion Technology (NIFT) in New Delhi. She confessed being severely asthmatic in childhood and always unwell and weak physically. She also claimed to be completely cured of asthma with the blessing of a family in Hyderabad.

== Personal life ==
Her personal hobbies are cooking, listening to music, reading, and dance. Sharma is trained in the Indian classical dance form called Kathak. Apart from that, she has also learned street hip hop, Latin dancing-salsa, merengue, jive, and jazz from the Pineapple Dance Studios in London. She considers Kate Moss as her style inspiration. Sharma also aspires to launch her own clothing label.

== Filmography ==
=== Films ===
Key
†	Denotes films that have not yet been released

Year	Title	Role	Language	Notes	Ref.
2007	Chirutha	Sanjana	Telugu		
2009	Kurradu	Hema	Telugu		
2010	Crook	Suhani	Hindi		
2012	Teri Meri Kahaani	Meera	Hindi	Cameo appearance	
2012	Kyaa Super Kool Hain Hum	Simran Singhania	Hindi		
2013	Jayantabhai Ki Luv Story	Simran Desai	Hindi		
2013	Yamla Pagla Deewana 2	Suman Khanna	Hindi		
2014	Youngistaan	Anwita Chauhan	Hindi		
2016	Kriti	Kriti	Hindi	Short film	
2016	Xuanzang	Kumari	Mandarin		
2016	Tum Bin 2	Taran	Hindi		
2017	Mubarakan	Advocate Nafisa Qureshi	Hindi		
2017	Solo	Akshara	Malayalam	Bilingual film	
2017	Solo	Bhama	Tamil	Bilingual film	
2020	Tanhaji	Kamla Devi	Hindi		
2020	Ik Sandhu Hunda Si	Simran	Punjabi		
2021	Vikalp	Shivani	Hindi	Short film	
2021	Aafat-E-Ishq	Lallo	Hindi		
2023	Jogira Sara Ra Ra	Dimple Chaubey	Hindi		
2023	Hi Nanna	Model	Telugu	Cameo appearance	
2024	Bad Newz	Sejal	Hindi	Cameo appearance	
2026	Sanjog †	Seerat	Punjabi	Releasing 27th Nov 2026	

=== Web series ===
Year	Title	Role	Notes	Ref.
2020–2024	Illegal	Advocate Niharika Singh		
2022	Shinning With The Sharmas	Herself		
2024	36 Days	Farah Zaidi / Suhana Mohan		

=== Music video appearances ===
Year	Title	Singer(s)	Ref.
2019	"Dheeme Dheeme"	Tony Kakkar	
2020	"Gulabi Pagg"	Diljit Dosanjh	
2020	"Dil Ko Karaar Aaya"	Yasser Desai, Neha Kakkar	
2020	"Lambo Car"	Guri	
2021	"Thoda Thoda Pyaar"	Stebin Ben	
2022	"Pehli Pehli Baarish"	Yasser Desai	
2024	"Tu Hai"	Darshan Raval, Prakriti Giri	
2024	"Mukke Paaye Si"	B Praak	

== Other work and media image ==
Sharma in 2023

Sharma has frequently appeared in The Times of India's 50 Most Desirable Women list. She was placed 31st in 2010, 26th in 2011, 15th in 2012, 13th in 2013, 17th in 2014, 32nd in 2015, 33rd in 2016, 36th in 2017, 44th in 2018 and 2019, and 32nd in 2020. She was also featured on FHM 100 sexiest women in the world list, where she was placed 7th in 2014.

== Entrepreneurship ==
=== Football ===
In 2020, Neha became co-owner of IPL Soccer Team Birmingham Challengers, with H Dhami, Bambi Bains, Juggy D, and Blu Blood.

=== Hospitality ===
In 2024, Neha ventured into hospitality, by co-founding a new Japanese restaurant named Call Me Ten with Karann R Chawla, Angadh Singh, and Akshay Shokeen. The restaurant officially opened its doors to the public in September, 2024 and is based in the district of Vasant Vihar, Delhi.

== Awards and nominations ==
=== Awards ===
Year	Show/Movie	Category	Result	Ref.
2011	Crook: It’s Good to Be Bad	Ghanta Award – Worst Breakthrough	Nominated	
2020	Tanhaji: The Unsung Warrior	Best Supporting Actress	Nominated	
2021	Aafat-e-Ishq	Best Actress - Critics	Nominated	
2021	Illegal - Justice, Out of Order	Best Actress	Nominated	
2022	-	Most Desirable Women of India	Nominated	
2024	36 Days	Best Female Actor	Won	

== See also ==
- List of people from Bihar
- List of Indian film actresses
- List of Hindi film actresses
- List of Punjabi cinema actresses
