= Jaan-E-Mann =

2006 Indian film directed by Shirish Kunder

- Theatrical release poster
- Directed by: Shirish Kunder
- Written by: Shirish Kunder
- Produced by: Sajid Nadiadwala
- Starring: Salman Khan; Akshay Kumar; Preity Zinta; Anupam Kher
- Narrated by: Akshay Kumar
- Cinematography: Sudeep Chatterjee
- Edited by: Shirish Kunder
- Music by: Anu Malik
- Production company: Nadiadwala Grandson Entertainment
- Distributed by: Nadiadwala Grandson Entertainment
- Release date: 20 October 2006
- Running time: 173 minutes
- Country: India
- Language: Hindi
- Budget: ₹40 crore
- Box office: ₹46.26 crore

Jaan-E-Mann (transl. Beloved) is a 2006 Indian Hindi-language romantic comedy film directed by Shirish Kunder and was produced by Sajid Nadiawala. The film stars Salman Khan, Akshay Kumar and Preity Zinta. This was Kunder's debut film as a director. He also edited and wrote the screenplay and dialogue.

Jaan-E-Mann was released on 20 October 2006 on the festive weekend of Diwali/Eid, clashing with Don – The Chase Begins Again starring Shah Rukh Khan and Priyanka Chopra. The film proved to be a commercial failure at the box office. It received mixed reviews from critics upon release, with praise for its innovative filming techniques, visuals, production design, soundtrack and special effects; however its story, screenplay and dialogues received sharp criticism.

At the 52nd Filmfare Awards, Jaan-E-Mann received 2 nominations – Best Choreography (Farah Khan for "Humko Maloom Hai") and Best Special Effects.

== Plot ==
The film begins when Suhaan Kapoor (Salman Khan) receives a notice saying his ex-wife Piya Goyal (Preity Zinta), who has settled in New York, wants a divorce settlement of ₹5 million, because he failed to make his alimony payments due to his poor financial condition. Suhaan appeals to his uncle Bonney Kapoor (Anupam Kher), a mediation lawyer, for help. While they are trying to figure out a solution, Agastya Rao (Akshay Kumar) lands at their doorstep searching for Piya. He reveals to them that he fell in love with Piya during his college days but could not express his love to her because she was in love with someone else, unaware that the person he lost her to was Suhaan. Piya had ignored Agastya then, a nerd, a nobody, and even broke his heart by blowing him off to be with Suhaan at a concert that Agastya had taken her to. A heartbroken Agastya left the college as a result and eventually wound up in Houston working for NASA.

Suhaan and Piya fall in love in college and elope. However, he kept his marriage a secret to further his career as a movie star and when his career hits a low, he returns home to find out that she has left him. She does not answer his calls or letters, and he soon receives a divorce notice in the mail.

Suhaan and Bonney hatch a plan to get Agastya and Piya together so that Suhaan does not need to pay alimony to Piya and Agastya can end up with the woman of his dreams. Suhaan accompanies Agastya to New York to help Agastya win Piya over. They rent an apartment opposite Piya's and watch her every move using telescopes, binoculars, and surveillance techniques. Using a headset, Suhaan feeds Agastya lines to woo Piya with and eventually succeeds in getting Piya and Agastya together.

One night, Suhaan finds out Piya has a baby girl, Suhaan's daughter. He realizes that she left him since she did not want her and the baby to ruin Suhaan's film career. Suhaan realizes his mistake and tries to make amends and start a new life with Piya and his daughter, Suhaani. Unfortunately, before he can act, Piya gets engaged to Agastya.

It later emerges that Piya's brother, Vishal (Nawwab Shah), had been hiding letters that Suhaan wrote to her and was responsible for initiating the divorce process. Agastya realizes that Piya is still in love with Suhaan and not him; so, he reveals the truth and tells her to be with Suhaan. Piya flies back to India where Suhaan is trying to find work as a small-time actor. They express their mutual love, reuniting their broken family.

A few years later, Agastya is on a NASA Space Shuttle and initiates a video conference with Suhaan and Piya (on Suhaan's birthday). He introduces them to his new girlfriend who looks strikingly like Piya.

== Cast ==
- Salman Khan as Suhaan Kapoor, a former superstar who is married to his college girlfriend Piya. After hitting a career low, he gets a divorce notice from Piya and has to pay for the alimony.
- Akshay Kumar as Agastya Rao / Champu, a NASA specialist who used to have a crush on Piya during his years in college but was rejected by her back then. He becomes friends with Suhan and with his help, he tries to get him and Piya together.
- Preity Zinta as Piya Goyal Kapoor and Preity Zintacova (dual role)
- Aman Verma as Zubin Hornibhoy, Piya's friend
- Anupam Kher as Bonney Kapoor / New York Cafe Owner (Dual Role)
- Nawwab Shah as Vishal Goyal (Piya's brother)
- Soni Razdan as Mrs. Sushma Goyal
- Jawed Sheikh as Samrat Goyal
- Rajat Bedi as Vishal Goel, Piya's adopted brother

== Production ==
Filming started in New York City on 1 September 2005 and then moved to Mumbai.

== Soundtrack ==
The music for the film was released on 8 September 2006. The music is composed by Anu Malik and includes a few playback singers forming the former contestants of Indian Idol. Lyrics are penned by Gulzar. According to the Indian trade website Box Office India, with around 1,250,000 units sold, this film's soundtrack album was the year's eighth highest-selling.

=== Track listing ===
Jaan-E-Mann

Soundtrack album by Anu Malik
- Released: 8 September 2006
- Genre: Feature film soundtrack
- Label: T-Series
- Producer: Anu Malik

Anu Malik chronology
Zindaggi Rocks (2006)	Jaan-E-Mann (2006)	Umrao Jaan (2006)

No.	Title	Singer(s)	Length
1.	"Humko Maloom Hai"	Sonu Nigam, Sadhana Sargam	7:15
2.	"Ajnabi Shehar"	Sonu Nigam	7:00
3.	"Jaane Ke Jaane Na"	Sonu Nigam , Sukhwinder Singh, Krishna Beura	5:30
4.	"Sau Dard"	Sonu Nigam , Suzanne D'Mello	5:45
5.	"Ud Jaana.....Broi"	Kunal Ganjawala, Adnan Sami, Earl Edgar D'Souza, Sunidhi Chauhan	6:40
6.	"Kubool Kar Le"	Udit Narayan, Rahul Vaidya, Amit Sana, Prajakta Shukre, Monali Thakur, Suzanne D'Mello	6:37
7.	"Jaane Ke Jaane Na – Club Mix"	Sonu Nigam, Sukhwinder Singh, Krishna Beura	4:36
8.	"Sau Dard – Groove Mix"	Sonu Nigam , Suzanne D'Mello	4:45
9.	"Ud Jaana.....Broi – Club Mix"	Kunal Ganjawala, Adnan Sami, Earl Edgar D'Souza, Sunidhi Chauhan	6:11

== Reception ==
=== Box office ===
Jaan-E-Mann opened in nearly 1,200 screens worldwide. The film faced stiff competition from Don – The Chase Begins Again which also released on the same day. The film opened to a 40% response. The second day saw a huge drop in the collections, due to the Diwali celebrations. According to boxofficeindia.com, the collections jumped to 70%, but fell again to 50%. The film has done very well in the smaller centres in India.

Pranab Kapadia, the UK distributor of Jaan-E-Mann said "Jaan-E-Mann's figures have picked up dramatically in Britain. Although the film grossed a mere £18,000 on its opening day, the film has experienced a remarkable upswing, grossing £40,000 on Monday and £60,000 on Tuesday. The audience and critics reception has been overwhelming."

=== Critical reception ===
On the review aggregator website Rotten Tomatoes, 44% of 9 critics' reviews are positive.

Taran Adarsh of Bollywood Hungama gave the film 3.5 out of 5, saying "On the whole, JAAN-E-MANN balances humor and emotions beautifully. In fact, it's a BIG film in all respects -- right from its cast to the extravagant sets to the lavish making, besides, of course, unadulterated entertainment it has to offer. At the box-office, the Diwali and Idd holidays will prove bountiful for the film and add to the big returns. Business-wise, JAAN-E-MANN should fare best at multiplexes and also at major centres, besides Overseas. But its business at comparatively smaller centres, where masala films dominate, is bound to be affected by DON's presence. However, if the strong word of mouth catches on, the business at smaller centres will add to its booty." Poonam Joshi of BBC.com gave the film 4 out of 5 stars, writing "Jaan-E-mann simultaneously parodies the worst elements of Hindi cinema, while exulting in the best that Bollywood has to offer, making for an unexpectedly original and entertaining film." Raja Sen of Rediff.com gave the film 3 out of 5 stars stating "In the end, what echoes in your ears as you leave is Akki's thick, goofy he-he-he laugh. It's the best thing in the film."

Conversely, Namrata Joshi of Outlook India called the film "A mish-mash—a twisted love triangle but even the inventive narrative doesn't take it very far." Vincent Musetto of New York Post gave the film 1 out of 5 stars, writing "We keep waiting for one of those outlandish musical treats to bring some life to the clichd script. Kunder throws in a few breaks, but they're tepid and brief."

== Nominations ==
Award	Category	Nominees	Results
Screen Awards	Best Music Director	Anu Malik	Nominated
Screen Awards	Best Male Playback Singer	Sonu Nigam for "Humko Maloom Hai"	Nominated

== See also ==
- List of movies set in New York City
