= Farah Khan =

Indian filmmaker and choreographer (born 1965)

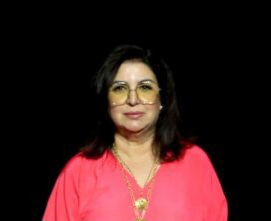
- Khan at Lakme Fashion Week 2025
- Born: Farah Khan; 9 January 1965 (age 61); Bombay, Maharashtra, India
- Education: St. Xavier's College, Bombay
- Occupations: Film Director; Choreographer; Dancer; Actress; Television Presenter; Writer; Producer; YouTuber
- Years active: 1987–present
- Spouse: Shirish Kunder (m. 2004)
- Children: 3
- Relatives: Akhtar–Azmi family

YouTube information
- Channel: Farah Khan
- Subscribers: 3.04 million
- Views: 1.71 billion
- Last updated: July 30 2026

Farah Khan Kunder (née Khan; born 9 January 1965) is an Indian film director, choreographer, dancer, writer, producer, and actress who works primarily in Hindi cinema. As a film director, Khan made her debut with the commercially successful Main Hoon Na (2004), followed by Om Shanti Om (2007), both of which earned her nominations for the Filmfare Award for Best Director. She later directed Tees Maar Khan (2010) and the ensemble heist musical Happy New Year (2014). She has choreographed more than a hundred songs in over 80 films, and has won the National Film Award for Best Choreography along with seven Filmfare Awards.

Khan has also worked in Telugu cinema & Tamil cinema and international projects, including Monsoon Wedding (2001), Bombay Dreams (2002), Vanity Fair (2004), Marigold: An Adventure in India (2007), the Chinese film Perhaps Love (2005), and Kung Fu Yoga (2017). Her work has earned her nominations at the Tony Awards and the Golden Horse Awards.

== Early life and personal life ==
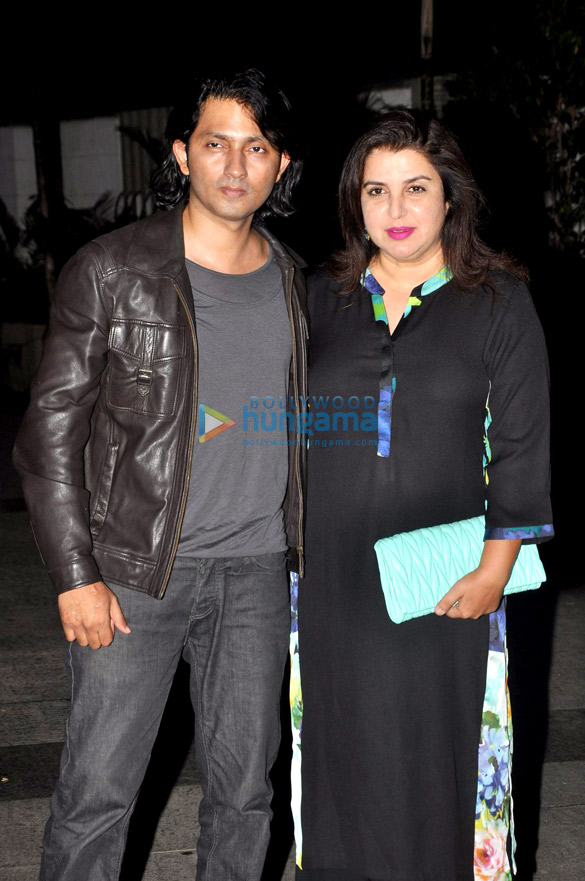
Shirish Kunder and Farah Khan in 2015

Farah Khan was born on 9 January 1965. Her father, Kamran Khan, was a stuntman-turned-filmmaker. Her mother, Menaka Irani, was the sister of former child actors Honey Irani and Daisy Irani. Farah is thus a first cousin of film personalities Farhan Akhtar and Zoya Akhtar (children of Honey Irani). She has one brother, Sajid Khan, who is a comedian, actor and film director.

Farah Khan married Shirish Kunder, the editor of her directorial debut Main Hoon Na (2004), on 9 December 2004. They have since worked together on each other's films, such as Jaan-E-Mann (2006), Om Shanti Om (2007), and Tees Maar Khan (2010). Khan gave birth to triplets — one son and two daughters — in 2008 through in vitro fertilisation.

== Career ==
=== Choreography career ===
Khan was studying sociology in St. Xavier's College, Bombay when the music video of Michael Jackson's "Thriller" was released. According to Khan, she was so inspired by the song, that although she hadn't danced before that, it soon became her vocation. She learned to dance on her own, and set up a dance group. When the choreographer Saroj Khan walked out of the film Jo Jeeta Wohi Sikandar (1992), Khan took over. This was followed by her role in choreographing numerous iconic dance numbers over the years. She met actor Shahrukh Khan on the sets of Kabhi Haan Kabhi Naa (1994) and the two have since become good friends and began their collaborative journey. She is the recipient of seven Filmfare Awards for Best Choreography.

In 2013, she also choreographed "Jumping Jhapak", the official anthem for 2013 Indian Premier League.

Khan also collaborated on several international projects such as Monsoon Wedding (2001), Bombay Dreams (2002) and Vanity Fair (2004), receiving a nomination for the Tony Award for Best Choreography for Bombay Dreams, alongside Anthony van Laast. Khan trained Colombian pop star Shakira for a Bollywood version of her song "Hips Don't Lie" for the MTV Video Music Awards on 31 August 2006. Khan has also choreographed Kylie Minogue for the song "Chiggy Wiggy" in the 2009 film Blue.

=== Directorial debut and breakthrough (2004–2007) ===
In 2004, Khan ventured into direction with the masala film Main Hoon Na (2004), starring Shahrukh Khan and Sushmita Sen in lead roles, produced by Red Chillies Entertainment. The film received positive reviews upon release, and emerged as the second highest-grossing Indian film of the year, only surpassed by another Shah Rukh Khan-starrer Veer-Zaara. It earned Khan her first nomination for the Filmfare Award for Best Director, thus becoming the second female director to be nominated for the award.

She followed it up with the reincarnation melodrama Om Shanti Om (2007), again starring Shahrukh Khan, alongside debutante Deepika Padukone in lead roles. The film received positive reviews from critics upon release, and emerged as the highest-grossing Hindi film of the year, in addition to becoming the highest-grossing Indian film ever at the time of its release. The film earned Khan her second nomination for the Filmfare Award for Best Director, thus becoming the first female director to be nominated for the award twice.

=== Challenges, acting debut and directorial resurgence (2010–present) ===
Her next directorial venture was the comedy Tees Maar Khan, starring Akshay Kumar, Akshaye Khanna and Katrina Kaif in the lead roles. Despite hype, the film was panned by critics upon release, but emerged as a modest commercial success at the box-office. Primarily remembered for Kaif's iconic dance number "Sheila Ki Jawani", also choreographed by Khan, it later gained cult status and is now vastly remembered for Khanna's performance.

She then made her acting debut alongside Boman Irani in the romantic comedy Shirin Farhad Ki Toh Nikal Padi (2012), directed by Bela Bhansali Sehgal, the sister of director Sanjay Leela Bhansali. The film received mixed-to-positive reviews upon release, but emerged as a commercial failure at the box-office.

Her next directorial venture was the dance heist comedy Happy New Year (2014), reteaming with Shahrukh Khan and Padukone 7 years after Om Shanti Om. She had initially announced to direct the film in 2005 and it was supposed to be Padukone's Hindi film debut, but was shelved due to multiple delays and cast changes that occurred over a number of years. The project was again reported as being in the works as of 2012. Upon release, the film received mixed reviews from critics, but emerged as the second highest-grossing Indian film of the year.

In April 2024, Khan started posting cooking vlogs featuring her cook Dilip, which have since become widely popular. She has three million subscribers on her YouTube channel.

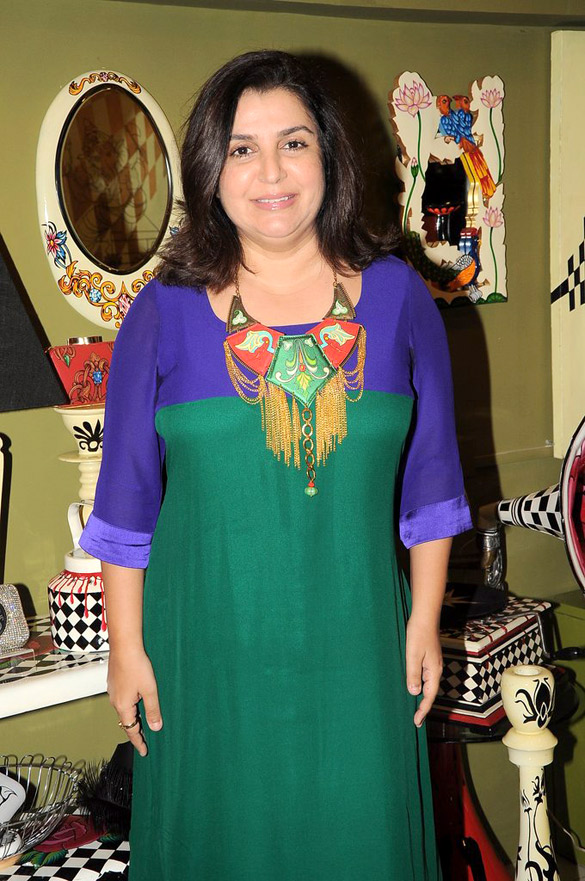
Khan in 2012

=== Television and production career ===
She hosted the celebrity chat show Tere Mere Beach Mein and was a judge on the reality television series Indian Idol – first and second season, Jo Jeeta Wohi Super Star, Entertainment Ke Liye Kuch Bhi Karega and Dance India Dance Li'l Masters. She also judged dance reality show Just Dance alongside Hrithik Roshan and Vaibhavi Merchant on Star Plus.

In 2015, Khan replaced Salman Khan and hosted the reality show Bigg Boss Halla Bol, the spin-off of Bigg Boss season 8.

Khan and her husband have started a production company called "Three's Company" named in honor of their triplets.

== Filmography ==
=== Film ===
Year	Title	Actress	Director	Producer	Script Writer	Role
1987	Jalwa	Yes				Dancer in the "Feeling Hot Hot" song
1998	Kuch Kuch Hota Hai	Yes				Woman on the Neelam show/ college student who makes fun of Anjali
2003	Kal Ho Naa Ho	Yes				One of the customers that come to the restaurant after its renovation
2004	Main Hoon Na	Yes	Yes		Yes	Herself (special appearance in song "Yeh Fizaein" during the end credits); Nominated – Filmfare Award for Best Director
2007	Om Shanti Om	Yes	Yes		Yes	An extra who has a spat with Om Prakash Makhija / Herself (special appearance during the end credits); Nominated for Filmfare Award for Best Director
2010	Jaane Kahan Se Aayi Hai	Yes				Herself
2010	Tees Maar Khan		Yes		Yes	Cameo in the end credits
2010	Khichdi: The Movie	Yes				Herself (cameo)
2012	Joker	Yes		Yes		Herself (special appearance); Producer
2012	Shirin Farhad Ki Toh Nikal Padi	Yes				Shirin Fugawala
2012	Student of the Year	Yes				Cameo in "Disco Song" as a judge
2014	Happy New Year	Yes	Yes		Yes	Cameo in the end credits
2016	Devi	Yes				Herself (guest appearance); multilingual film
2019	Student of the Year 2	Yes				Cameo in "The Jawaani Song" as a judge
2020	Mrs. Serial Killer			Yes		
2023	Khichdi 2: Mission Paanthukistan	Yes				Cameo
2026	Toaster	Yes				Nandini

=== Choreography ===
Year	Films	Notes
1986	Kahan Kahan Se Guzar Gaya	
1992	Jo Jeeta Wohi Sikandar	
1992	Angaar	
1993	Kabhi Haan Kabhi Naa	
1993	Waqt Hamara Hai	
1993	Pehla Nasha	
1993	Chandra Mukhi	
1993	1942: A Love Story	
1994	Aatish: Feel the Fire	
1995	Zamaana Deewana	
1995	Oh Darling! Yeh Hai India	
1995	Aazmayish	
1995	Takkar	
1995	Sisindri	Telugu film
1995	Hum Dono	
1995	Barsaat	
1995	Dilwale Dulhania Le Jayenge	
1995	Ram Shastra	
1996	English Babu Desi Mem	
1997	Virasat	Filmfare Award for Best Choreography for the song "Dhol Bajne Laga"
1997	Border	
1997	Yes Boss	
1997	Iruvar	Tamil film
1997	Yeshwant	
1997	Dil To Pagal Hai	
1997	Uff! Yeh Mohabbat	
1998	Keemat: They Are Back	
1998	Duplicate	
1998	Jab Pyaar Kisise Hota Hai	
1998	Angaaray	
1998	Saat Rang Ke Sapne	
1998	Dil Se..	Filmfare Award for Best Choreography for the song "Chaiyya Chaiyya"
1998	Kuch Kuch Hota Hai	
1998	Jhooth Bole Kauwa Kaate	
1998	Minsara Kanavu	Tamil film
1999	Sirf Tum	
1999	Ravoyi chandamama	Telugu film
1999	Laawaris	
1999	Silsila Hai Pyar Ka	
1999	Sarfarosh	
1999	Hote Hote Pyar Ho Gaya	
1999	Baadshah	
1999	Mast	
2000	Alai Payuthey	Tamil film
2000	Mela	
2000	Kaho Naa... Pyaar Hai	Filmfare Award for Best Choreography for the song "Ek Pal Ka Jeena"
2000	Phir Bhi Dil Hai Hindustani	
2000	Pukar	
2000	Hum To Mohabbat Karega	
2000	Josh	
2000	Har Dil Jo Pyar Karega	
2000	Fiza	
2000	Mohabbatein	
2001	Dil Chahta Hai	Filmfare Award for Best Choreography for the song "Woh Ladki Hai Kahaan"
2001	Monsoon Wedding	
2001	Asoka	
2001	Kabhi Khushi Kabhie Gham	
2001	One 2 Ka 4	
2002	Hum Tumhare Hain Sanam	
2002	Maine Dil Tujhko Diya	
2002	Shakti : The Power	
2002	Kya Yehi Pyaar Hai	
2002	Tumko Na Bhool Paayenge	
2002	Yeh Dil Aashiqanaa	
2002	Koi Mere Dil Se Poochhe	
2002	Santosham	Telugu film
2002	Bombay Dreams	Nominated: Tony Award for Best Choreography
2003	Confidence	
2003	Armaan	
2003	Supari	
2003	Koi... Mil Gaya	National Film Award for Best Choreography for the song "Idhar Chala Main Udhar Chala" Filmfare Award for Best Choreography for the song "Idhar Chala Main Udhar Chala"
2003	Wonderland	
2003	Kal Ho Naa Ho	
2003	Chalte Chalte	
2004	Main Hoon Na	
2004	Mujhse Shaadi Karogi	
2004	Vanity Fair	
2005	Kaal	
2005	Paheli	
2005	Perhaps Love	Golden Horse Award for Best Action Choreography
2005	Bluffmaster	
2005	Maine Pyaar Kyun Kiya	
2006	Krrish	
2006	Yun Hota Toh Kya Hota	
2006	Kabhi Alvida Naa Kehna	
2006	Baabul	
2006	Jaan-E-Mann: Let's Fall in Love... Again	
2006	Don - The Chase Begins Again	
2006	Zindaggi Rocks	
2006	Heyy Babyy	
2007	Marigold: An Adventure in India	
2007	Om Shanti Om	
2007	My Name Is Anthony Gonsalves	
2007	Welcome	
2008	Dostana	
2009	Billu	
2009	Main Aur Mrs Khanna	
2009	Blue	
2010	My Name Is Khan	
2010	Dabangg	Song "Munni Badnaam Hui"
2010	Tees Maar Khan	Filmfare Award for Best Choreography for the song "Sheila Ki Jawani"
2011	Delhi Belly	Song "Jaa Chudail"
2012	Housefull 2	Song "Anarkali Disco Chali"
2012	Nanban	Tamil film; Song "Irukaanaa"
2012	Student of the Year	Song "Ishq Wala Love" and "Radha"
2012	Dabangg 2	Song "Fevicol Se"
2013	Yeh Jawaani Hai Deewani	Song "Ghagra"
2013	Chennai Express	Song "Titli"
2013	Himmatwala	
2014	Happy New Year	
2015	Dilwale	Song "Gerua"
2016	Sultan	
2017	Kung Fu Yoga	
2017	Rangoon	
2018	Dhadak	Song "Zingaat"
2018	Veere Di Wedding	
2019	Housefull 4	Song "Ek Chumma"
2019	Student of the Year 2	Song "The Hook Up Song"
2020	Dil Bechara	Filmfare Award for Best Choreography for the song "Dil Bechara"
2024	Ishq Vishk Rebound	

=== Television ===
Year	Show	Role	Notes
2004–2006, 2016–2017	Indian Idol	Judge	Season 1, 2 and 7
2006–present	Jhalak Dikhhla Jaa	Judge	Seasons 1, 9, 11
2008	Jo Jeeta Wohi Super Star	Judge	
2008, 2015	Nach Baliye	Judge	Season 4 and 7
2009–2014	Entertainment Ke Liye Kuch Bhi Karega	Judge	
2010	Dance India Dance Li'l Masters 1	Judge	
2011	Just Dance	Judge	
2012	Dance Ke Superkids	Judge	
2012	India's Got Talent	Judge	Season 4
2013	Nach Baliye Shriman v/s Shrimati	Judge	
2013	Dance India Dance Supermoms	Judge	
2015	Bigg Boss Halla Bol	Co-host	
2015	Farah Ki Dawat	Host	
2020	Fear Factor: Khatron Ke Khiladi – Made in India	Interim Host	
2021	Zee Comedy Show	Judge	
2022	The Khatra Show	Host	
2025	Celebrity MasterChef	Host & Judge	
2025	Mangal Lakshmi	Judge	
2026–	Lock Upp: Sach Ya Saza	Host	

== Accolades ==
Year	Award	Category	Song	Result	Ref
1998	43rd Filmfare Awards	Best Choreography	"Dhol Bajne Laga" (Virasat)	Won	
1999	44th Filmfare Awards	Best Choreography	"Chaiyya Chaiyya" (Dil Se..)	Won	
2001	46th Filmfare Awards	Best Choreography	"Ek Pal Ka Jeena" (Kaho Naa... Pyaar Hai)	Won	
2001	2nd IIFA Awards	Best Choreography	"Ek Pal Ka Jeena" (Kaho Naa... Pyaar Hai)	Won	
2001	6th Screen Awards	Best Choreography	"Ek Pal Ka Jeena" (Kaho Naa... Pyaar Hai)	Won	
2001	6th Screen Awards	Best Choreography	Mohabbatein	Nominated	
2002	47th Filmfare Awards	Best Choreography	"Woh Ladki Hai Kahaan" (Dil Chahta Hai)	Won	
2002	2nd IIFA Awards	Best Choreography	"Woh Ladki Hai Kahaan" (Dil Chahta Hai)	Won	
2002	7th Screen Awards	Best Choreography	"Woh Ladki Hai Kahaan" (Dil Chahta Hai)	Won	
2002	American Choreography Awards	Outstanding Achievement In Feature Film	Monsoon Wedding	Nominated	
2004	49th Filmfare Awards	Best Choreography	"Idhar Chala Mein Udhar Chala" (Koi... Mil Gaya)	Won	
2004	4th IIFA Awards	Best Choreography	"Maahi Ve" (Kal Ho Naa Ho)	Won	
2004	50th National Film Awards	Best Choreography	"Idhar Chala Mein Udhar Chala" (Koi... Mil Gaya)	Won	
2004	Bollywood Awards	Best Choreography	"Idhar Chala Mein Udhar Chala" (Koi... Mil Gaya)	Won	
2004	Sansui Viewer's Choice Awards	Best Choreography	"Idhar Chala Mein Udhar Chala" (Koi... Mil Gaya)	Won	
2004	9th Screen Awards	Best Choreography	"Idhar Chala Mein Udhar Chala" (Koi... Mil Gaya)	Won	
2004	9th Screen Awards	Best Choreography	"Pretty Woman" (Kal Ho Naa Ho)	Nominated	
2004	6th Zee Cine Awards	Best Choreography	"Pretty Woman" (Kal Ho Naa Ho)	Nominated	
2005	50th Filmfare Awards	Best Director	Main Hoon Na	Nominated	
2005	7th Zee Cine Awards	Best Director	Main Hoon Na	Nominated	
2005	7th Zee Cine Awards	Best Debut Director	Main Hoon Na	Won	
2005	10th Screen Awards	Most Promising Debut Director	Main Hoon Na	Won	
2005	6th IIFA Awards	Best Debut Director	Main Hoon Na	Won	
2005	6th IIFA Awards	Best Director	Main Hoon Na	Nominated	
2005	6th IIFA Awards	Best Choreography	"Laal Dupatta" (Mujhse Shaadi Karogi)	Won	
2005	Screen Weekly Awards	Best Choreography	"Laal Dupatta" (Mujhse Shaadi Karogi)	Nominated	
2005	Screen Weekly Awards	Best Choreography	"Tum Se Mil Ke" (Main Hoon Na)	Nominated	
2007	52nd Filmfare Awards	Best Choreography	"Humko Maloom Hain" (Jaan-E-Mann)	Nominated	
2008	53rd Filmfare Awards	Best Film	Om Shanti Om	Nominated	
2008	53rd Filmfare Awards	Best Director	Om Shanti Om	Nominated	
2008	10th Zee Cine Awards	Best Director	Om Shanti Om	Nominated	
2008	10th Zee Cine Awards	Best Choreography	"Dhoom Taana" (Om Shanti Om)	Won	
2008	Annual Central European Bollywood Awards	Best Choreography	"Dhoom Taana" (Om Shanti Om)	Won	
2008	Annual Central European Bollywood Awards	Best Film	Om Shanti Om	Won	
2008	Annual Central European Bollywood Awards	Best Director	Om Shanti Om	Won	
2008	14th Stardust Awards	Dream Director	Om Shanti Om	Won	
2008	13th Screen Awards	Best Director	Om Shanti Om	Nominated	
2008	13th Screen Awards	Best Choreography	"Dhoom Taana" (Om Shanti Om)	Won	
2009	10th IIFA Awards	Best Choreography	"Desi Girl" (Dostana)	Won	
2011	56th Filmfare Awards	Best Choreography	"Sheila Ki Jawani" (Tees Mar Khan)	Won	
2011	12th IIFA Awards	Best Choreography	"Munni Badnaam Hui" (Dabangg)	Won	
2011	16th Screen Awards	Best Choreography	"Munni Badnaam Hui" (Dabangg)	Won	
2013	14th Zee Cine Awards	Best Choreography	"Fevicol Se" (Dabangg 2)	Nominated	
2013	18th Screen Awards	Best Choreography	"Fevicol Se" (Dabangg 2)	Nominated	
2013	10th Stardust Awards	Best Actress	Shirin Farhad Ki Toh Nikal Padi	Won	
2014	11th Stardust Awards	Dream Director	Happy New Year	Won	
2015	Bollywood Hungama Surfers' Choice Music Awards	Best Choreography	"Lovely" (Happy New Year)	Nominated	
2016	Bollywood Hungama Surfers' Choice Music Awards	Best Choreography	"Gerua" (Dilwale)	Won	
2017	14th Stardust Awards	Best Choreography	"Baby Ko Bass Pasand Hai" (Sultan)	Nominated	
2019	20th Zee Cine Awards	Best Choreography	"Tareefan" (Veere Di Wedding)	Nominated	
2019	20th Zee Cine Awards	Best Choreography	"Zingaat" (Dhadak)	Nominated	
2021	66th Filmfare Awards	Best Choreography	"Dil Bechara" (Dil Bechara)	Won	
2022	67th Filmfare Awards	Best Choreography	"Tip Tip" (Sooryavanshi)	Nominated	

== See also ==
- Indian Women in Dance
