= Om Shanti Om =

2007 Indian film by Farah Khan

- Theatrical release poster
- Directed by: Farah Khan
- Screenplay by: Farah Khan; Mushtaq Shiekh
- Dialogues by: Mayur Puri
- Story by: Farah Khan
- Produced by: Gauri Khan
- Starring: Shah Rukh Khan; Deepika Padukone; Arjun Rampal; Shreyas Talpade; Kirron Kher
- Cinematography: V. Manikandan
- Edited by: Shirish Kunder
- Music by: Songs: Vishal–Shekhar; Score: Sandeep Chowta\Gopi Sundar
- Production company: Red Chillies Entertainment
- Distributed by: Eros International
- Release dates: 9 November 2007 (India); 2 December 2007 (France); 15 January 2008 (United Kingdom)
- Running time: 171 minutes
- Country: India
- Language: Hindi
- Budget: ₹40 crore
- Box office: ₹152 crore

Om Shanti Om (transl. and released internationally as Peace Be With You (Note: The phrase, an Indian greeting meaning "Peace Be With You", also refers to the film's lead characters.)) is a 2007 Indian Hindi-language masala film written and directed by Farah Khan, co-written by Mayur Puri and Mushtaq Shiekh, and produced by Gauri Khan under Red Chillies Entertainment. The film stars Shah Rukh Khan, Deepika Padukone (in her Hindi film debut), Arjun Rampal, Shreyas Talpade, Kirron Kher. Spanning four odd decades, the narrative follows Om Prakash Makhija, an obscure 1970s actor in love with female superstar Shanti, who dies in a suspicious on-set fire that kills Shanti and is reincarnated 30 years later as the superstar Om Kapoor, determined to punish the person who ignited the blaze with the help of Shanti's lookalike.

Farah Khan began development for the film while directing the musical Bombay Dreams (2002), and it began production after its leads were cast. The film's title is borrowed from a song from Subhash Ghai's thriller Karz (1980), which also features in the opening credits. Om Shanti Om's soundtrack was composed by Vishal–Shekhar, with the lyrics written by Javed Akhtar, Vishal Dadlani, and Kumaar. The background score was composed by Sandeep Chowta. The film is notable for its cameo appearances from Indian film celebrities.

Produced on a budget of ₹40 crore (US$9.67 million), Om Shanti Om emerged as the highest grossing Hindi film of 2007 and the then-highest grossing Hindi film of all time. The soundtrack was also critical and commercial success, becoming the highest-selling album of the year in India. The film received positive reviews from critics, with praise for its story, direction, cast performances, production design, and soundtrack. Om Shanti Om received a leading 13 nominations at the 53rd Filmfare Awards, winning for Best Female Debut (Padukone) and Best Special Effects.

== Plot ==
In 1977, Om Prakash "Omi" Makhija (played by Shah Rukh Khan), a junior artist in Mumbai, dreams of becoming a renowned actor. He lives with his widowed mother, Bela (played by Kirron Kher), and his friend Pappu Master (played by Shreyas Talpade) in a small chawl. Omi adores the glamorous superstar actress Shantipriya (played by Deepika Padukone), often expressing his feelings in front of her film poster. One night, he and Pappu sneak into the premiere of Shanti's film, Dreamy Girl, in disguise, making a memorable impression on her. Later, Omi, inebriated, gives a heartfelt acceptance speech to Pappu and local children, pretending to have won an award.

Omi and Pappu land minor roles at R.C. Studios, owned by the egotistical producer Mukesh Mehra (played by Arjun Rampal), who also launched Shanti's career. During a shoot, Shanti gets trapped in a fire but is rescued by Omi. The two become friends, and although Omi initially lies about being a Tamil film star to impress her, he eventually confesses the truth. Shanti grows close to Omi, and with Pappu's help, they share a memorable evening date together at the studio.

Omi overhears a heated argument between Shanti and Mukesh, revealing that they are secretly married. Shanti is furious when she learns that Mukesh plans to marry the daughter of the distributor for his upcoming film, Om Shanti Om. She reveals to Mukesh that she is pregnant with his child, which seems to please him. Heartbroken, Omi avoids Shanti.

One night, Mukesh takes Shanti to the future set of Om Shanti Om, claiming he will cancel the film and have a grand wedding there to make their marriage public. Omi visits Shanti but is devastated to see her with Mukesh; he leaves without either noticing. However, once Omi leaves, Mukesh reveals his true colours to Shanti, confessing that his actual plan is to kill her and their unborn child to avoid any impedance in his career as a producer. He lights up the set on fire and locks Shanti inside. Despite his attempts to rescue her after Mukesh leaves, Omi gets beaten by Mukesh's guards and is thrown out by an explosion by the time he can get to Shanti. The set burns down with Shanti inside. Omi is later struck by the car of actor Rajesh Kapoor, whose wife Lovely is in labor. Rajesh brings Omi to the hospital, but he dies from his injuries, while Rajesh and Lovely welcome a baby boy named Om Kapoor.

30 years later, Om Kapoor aka O. K., now a successful yet arrogant actor, suffers from pyrophobia and frequently encounters Bela, who believes him to be her son. He dismisses her as delusional, and Pappu, now old, tries to explain the truth, but Bela remains unconvinced.

While shooting at the abandoned R.C. Studios, O.K. experiences vivid flashbacks of Omi trying to rescue Shanti and later unwittingly delivers Omi's old drunken speech at a Filmfare Awards event. Pappu watches him on TV and realizes that Omi has reincarnated as Om Kapoor. At a party celebrating his victory, O.K. meets Mukesh, now known as Mike, who proposes a film collaboration; an introduction to him causes O.K. to fully remember his previous life. Om finally reunites with Bela and Pappu at the old chawl, and together with Om's assistant Anwar, they plan to expose Mukesh's crimes.

O.K. resumes filming Om Shanti Om at the old studio after convincing Mukesh to revive the project, and after many failed auditions of other actresses, hires Sandhya "Sandy" Bansal, an aspiring actress who is an exact doppelgänger of Shanti and a huge fangirl of Om. Pappu and Bela start training her to behave exactly like Shanti. Om initially hides his plan but later reveals the truth to Sandy, who promises to help him. At the film's inauguration, Bela, disguised as a witch, and Sandy, disguised as Shanti's ghost, try to scare Mukesh into confessing. Despite a fake inauguration plan gone wrong, a photograph of Shanti inexplicably catches fire, unsettling Mukesh and confusing Om and Pappu.

During a masquerade ball for the film's music launch, Om indirectly hints at Mukesh's guilt through Shanti's story. However, Sandy accidentally reveals her ruse by injuring herself, proving she is not a ghost. Mukesh, suspicious of the film reels, chases Sandy but is knocked out by a chandelier. When he regains consciousness, O.K. confronts him in the empty venue about Shanti's murder. Mukesh mocks O.K., claiming there is no proof and revealing he knows Sandy is not Shanti. Sandy then appears, disclosing that Mukesh had buried Shanti alive under the chandelier after discovering she had survived the initial fire. She even foretells that Shanti's body will be found, which will be proof of murder for the court. Both Om and Mukesh are perturbed at how deeply she knows Shanti's tragic story; in the confrontation that follows, Om finally overcomes his pyrophobia and defeats Mukesh, who is crushed to death by the falling chandelier.

Pappu and Anwar arrive with the real Sandy. Om then realizes that the woman with him is actually Shanti's ghost, who was also responsible for the unexplained aids in his plan. With her death now avenged, Om and Shanti bid each other a tearful goodbye; Shanti's spirit disappears, having attained peace, while Om embraces Sandy.

== Cast ==
- Shahrukh Khan as Om "Omi" Prakash Makhija / Om Kapoor (OK)
- Deepika Padukone as Shanti Priya / Sandhya "Sandy" Bansal
- Arjun Rampal as Mukesh "Mike" Mehra, Shanti's husband
- Shreyas Talpade as Pappu Master, Omi's best friend
- Kirron Kher as Bela Makhija, Omi's mother
- Javed Sheikh as Rajesh Kapoor, O.K.'s father
- Asavari Joshi as Lovely Kapoor, O.K.'s mother
- Yuvika Chaudhary as Dolly Arora, O.K.'s heroine in the film Om Shanti Om
- Bindu Desai as Kamini Arora, Dolly's mother
- Nitesh Pandey as Anwar Sheikh, O.K.'s assistant
- Naseer Abdullah as Naseer, Rajesh's secretary
- Lin Laishram as OK's friend
- Shawar Ali as hero in the film Om Shanti Om

Cameo appearances

- Vishal Dadlani as the Director of Mohabbat Man
- Haresh Hingorani as Faizan ‘F’ Khan, director of Om Shanti Om
- Suresh Chatwal as Suresh, Omi's friend
- Satish Shah as film director Partho Roy
- V. Manikandan as the Director of Mind It
- Mayur Puri as the Director of Apahij Pyar
- Sanjiv Chawla as the Producer of Apahij Pyar
- Priya Patil as Natasha, O.K.'s heroine in Apahij Pyar
- Farah Khan as the woman who makes fun of Omi; also appears in the end credits
- Abhishek Bachchan as himself
- Bappi Lahiri as himself
- Chunky Pandey as himself
- Koena Mitra as herself
- Feroz Khan as himself
- Karan Johar as himself
- Rakesh Roshan as himself
- Hrithik Roshan as himself
- Bipasha Basu as herself
- Sanjay Kapoor as himself
- Yash Chopra as himself
- Amitabh Bachchan as himself
- Ameesha Patel as OK's heroine at Filmfare Awards
- Dia Mirza as OK's heroine at Filmfare Awards
- Akshay Kumar as himself
- Rishi Kapoor as himself
- Subhash Ghai as himself
- Rani Mukerji as herself

=== Special appearances in the "Deewangi Deewangi" song (in order of appearance) ===
- Rani Mukerji
- Zayed Khan
- Vidya Balan
- Jeetendra
- Tusshar Kapoor
- Priyanka Chopra
- Shilpa Shetty
- Dharmendra
- Shabana Azmi
- Urmila Matondkar
- Karishma Kapoor
- Arbaaz Khan
- Malaika Arora
- Dino Morea
- Amrita Arora
- Juhi Chawla
- Aftab Shivdasani
- Tabu
- Govinda
- Mithun Chakraborty
- Kajol
- Bobby Deol
- Preity Zinta
- Rekha
- Riteish Deshmukh
- Salman Khan
- Saif Ali Khan
- Sanjay Dutt
- Lara Dutta
- Suniel Shetty

=== Special appearances in the "Dhoom Taana" song ===
- Sunil Dutt as himself
- Rajesh Khanna as himself
- Jeetendra as himself

== Production ==
=== Development ===
In 2002, Farah Khan worked as a choreographer for the musical Bombay Dreams in London, which she felt presented a "clichéd and outdated version" of the Indian film industry. She thought that the musical would not be successful if released in India. She instead thought of a new story, writing her initial thoughts about the subject on Andrew Lloyd Webber's letterhead while staying in his house. Later in 2006, Farah began to work on her next project, which was tentatively titled Happy New Year. Amid speculations that Shah Rukh Khan would star in Happy New Year, the actor rejected the first draft of the film, upon which Farah's husband and editor Shirish Kunder reminded her of the story she had conceived while in London. Happy New Year, which was to mark Deepika Padukone's Hindi debut, was put on hiatus and revived more than 8 years later under the same title.

Farah completed writing the first script of Om Shanti Om within two weeks. (Note: This fact in itself, appears to strongly corroborate Monga's allegation of plagiarism, which later was found to be correct by the Film Writers' association) She set the first half in the 1970s as she felt the Hindi films made during that period were much more influential than those made in other periods, particularly the 1980s, which she felt was a period when "the worst movies were made". She also included many references to the 1970s, which were also prevalent in films of that time. She said, "Everything in the first half is about the 70s—such as the mother who overacts, mouthing clichéd dialogues. Then there are cabarets, badminton and other stuff popular during that era." Shah Rukh's costumes were designed by Karan Johar, while Manish Malhotra designed Padukone's costumes. The rest of the cast had their costumes designed by Sanjeev Mulchandani.

In addition to directing the film, Farah co-wrote the story with Mayur Puri and Mushtaq Shiekh. She was also the film's choreographer. Puri wrote the screenplay and dialogues. He completed the writing process in two months and rewrote the film's second half. Puri created the screenplay by writing his natural reaction to the characters as scenarios. He knew that despite being part of a crowd, junior artists do not want to be recognised as such, ruins their chances of landing a leading role in future. This was used in a sequence involving Shah Rukh and Talpade, who play junior artists. Puri blended different genres together in Om Shanti Om, which he felt was challenging. He used his personal memories from childhood for creating the 1970s. Shirish Kunder was the editor, while V. Manikandan was the cinematographer.

Sabu Cyril was the film's production designer. Sabu was first offered the Mani Ratnam-directed Guru (2007) at a time when Om Shanti Om was being planned, but ultimately chosen the latter due to his earlier commitment to Farah for her future project. Farah used two particular dialogues in the film: "When you want something badly, the whole universe conspires to give to you" and "In the end everything will be ok and if its not ok its not the end". These were used as Khan felt that it reflected her philosophy in her life. Farah stated that the film's opening scene was her most favourite in it. In 2008, Puri felt his most favourite dialogue from the ones he wrote would be the Filmfare Awards speech. The film's title derives from the eponymous song from the film Karz (1980). Om is a Hindu mantra; Om Shanti Om roughly translates to "Peace Be With You".

The film opens with the grandeur shot of the most famous songs of Karz that is Om Shanti Om featuring Rishi Kapoor and SRK as a junior film artist standing in the crowd.

=== Casting ===
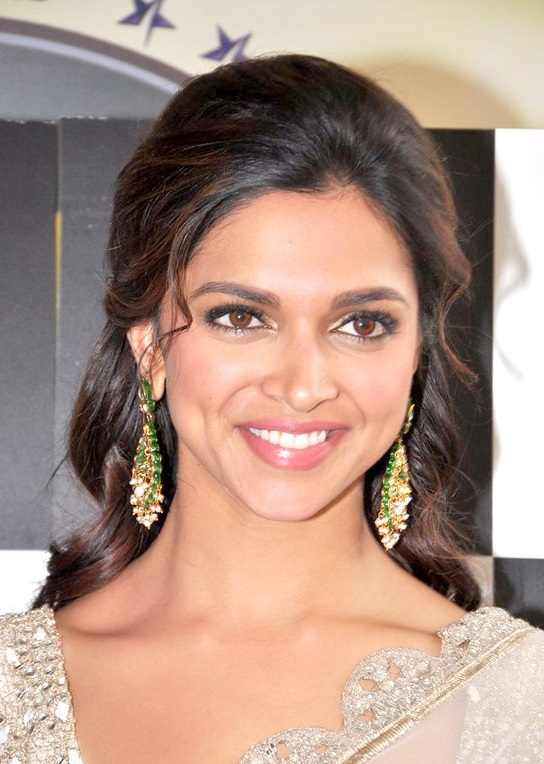
Deepika Padukone plays the love interest of Shah Rukh Khan's character in her Hindi film debut.

Shah Rukh was cast as the lead; he worked hard on his physique for a song sequence. He felt Om Shanti Om was a "happy film".

Farah was advised by Malaika Arora to cast Padukone as the female lead, who was suggested by Wendell Rodricks, under whom Padukone was working. She was cast without a screen test. Khan felt that she was "a beautiful, classic Indian beauty" who fit the role of an actor of the 1970s. She was excited at the prospect of working with Shah Rukh and said, "I've grown up watching [Shah Rukh] and always admired him so much. To get to work with him ... is quite wonderful. It was also fantastic that Farah showed faith in my talent and cast me opposite him."

In preparation for her role, Padukone watched several films of actresses Helen and Hema Malini to study their body language. Her character was modelled after Malini and nicknamed Dreamy Girl after her the latter's nickname as Dream Girl. Rampal was approached by both Khan and Shah Rukh at the latter's New Year's Eve party. Rampal was initially reluctant to do the role as he felt it was "too evil" for someone like him. With persuasion from Shah Rukh, he agreed. Rampal wore a mustache in the film which was suggested by Shah Rukh. Shreyas Talpade played a supporting role as the best friend of Khan's character. After the release of Iqbal (2005) and completing the filming of Dor, Talpade, who attended the same gym as Khan, was called for a narration of what would be Om Shanti Om. He agreed to do the role.

Kirron Kher, Bindu and Javed Sheikh also appear in the film. A further red carpet scene featuring a number of actors making guest appearances, including R. Madhavan and Farhan Akhtar as well as Prem Chopra, Shakti Kapoor and Vidhu Vinod Chopra was deleted from the film.

=== Principal photography ===
Om Shanti Om was made on a budget of ₹40 crore. The first scene to be filmed was one where Talpade's character tells Shah Rukh's character that he will be a hero; Shah Rukh was an hour late for filming. Farah was pregnant with triplets while filming and experienced difficulties while shooting, she would constantly vomit while directing the film. The film was shot entirely in sync sound; Farah dismissed rumours of Padukone's voice being dubbed. In 2015, however, Mona Ghosh Shetty admitted to have dubbed for Padukone in the film. The fake fight scene involving a stuffed tiger was inspired by a similar scene in the film Tarzan 303. Old cars owned by actors Rajesh Khanna and Hema Malini were used for filming for authenticity.

A number of references to real life was also filmed, including a scene in which Om rescues Shanti from a fire, which was a spoof of Sunil Dutt rescuing Nargis from a fire on the sets of Mother India (1957). For a shot involving a Filmfare Awards ceremony, Khan stood on the red carpet of an actual Filmfare Award ceremony and requested actors to dictate dialogues as she stated. The song "Dhoom Taana" has digitally altered guest appearances, which included Sunil Dutt from Amrapali (1966), Rajesh Khanna from Sachaa Jhutha (1970) and Jeetendra from Jay Vejay (1977). Farah wanted to film Shakira for filming a special appearance had made her commit a few days for the role. Due to the uncertainty of her dates, the idea was scrapped.

In February 2007, a filming schedule was completed in Film City. It was then reported that filming would move outdoors after Shah Rukh completed filming for Kaun Banega Crorepati. The visuals of the song "Deewangi Deewangi" where Om meets Mukesh, was heavily inspired by a scene featuring Jeet and Priyanshu Chatterjee from Bengali film Bidhatar Lekha, which was also based on the theme of reincarnation and coincidentally was released in April 2007. It was shot over a period of six days. In October 2007, Abhishek Bachchan finished filming for his cameo appearance; he shot between 10 and 2 in the night for his screen time of about one and a half minutes. Filming of the last sequence and the end-credit song was done in Film City. Farah continued the tradition of featuring an end-credits song beginning with Main Hoon Na (2004).

Om Shanti Om was produced by Shah Rukh's wife Gauri Khan under their Red Chillies Entertainment banner. While Marching Ants handled the publicity design, Gauri was the presenter. Shyam Kaushal, Amar Shetty and Shah Rukh were the action directors. The film's final reel length was 4013.94 ft (1223.45 m).

== Music ==
The film score was composed by Sandeep Chowta while the original songs featured in Om Shanti Om were composed by the duo Vishal–Shekhar with lyrics by Javed Akhtar, Kumaar and Vishal Dadlani. One song was composed by Pyarelal of the Laxmikant-Pyarelal duo. The vocals are provided by KK, Sukhwinder Singh, Marianne, Nisha, Caralisa Monteiro, Shaan, Udit Narayan, Shreya Ghoshal, Sunidhi Chauhan, Rahul Saxena, Sonu Nigam, Rahat Fateh Ali Khan, Richa Sharma, Abhijeet Bhattacharya, DJ Aqeel, DJ G, Kiran Karnath, Jackie V, Nikhil Chinapa, DJ Nawed and Zoheb. Trade reports predicted the album to be commercially successful even before its release. The soundtrack album of Om Shanti Om was released on 18 September 2007 on CD, and was the highest-selling music album of the year in India, with sales of around 2 million units.

== Release ==
=== Theatrical ===
==== Screening and statics ====
Om Shanti Om created a record of sorts by going in for an unheard of 2000 prints (worldwide) release. This was the highest number of prints (including digital) for any Indian movie at the time of its release.

==== Pre-sale records ====
Om Shanti Om set another record for registered pre-advance booking of 18,000 tickets in a chain of theatres in Delhi a few days before the advance booking was to start. A special screening was conducted for Bollywood actors. Red Chillies Entertainment had reportedly sold the world rights for the film to Eros International for an amount between Rs. 720–750 million. Baba Films, a production and distribution company, had offered a record Rs. 110 million for the rights to the Mumbai Circuit, surpassing the highest amount ever paid for the territory. As a marketing strategy, Amul advertised Shah Rukh.

=== Home media ===
In the United Kingdom, the film was watched by 750,000 viewers on Channel 4 in 2010. This made it the year's most-watched foreign-language film on UK television, above the Japanese animated film Spirited Away and German animated film The Little Polar Bear.

== Controversies ==
=== Spoof on Manoj Kumar ===
Manoj Kumar planned to sue the makers of Om Shanti Om for showing his body double in bad taste. Kumar added, "Are the Mumbai police so stupid that they can't recognise Manoj Kumar and lathicharge him in the '70s when he was a star?". Later, in a press conference, Shahrukh Khan and director Farah Khan accepted their mistake and apologised for the matter. Farah Khan even offered to cut the scene which Manoj Kumar felt was hurtful, but Kumar refused on grounds that, as Farah had stated, "I [Farah Khan] am like his daughter. He said, 'Betiyaan maafi nahi maangti' (Daughters don't ask for forgiveness). I told him that he could've called me and scolded me." Later, Kumar said that though this incident was hurtful to him, he wishes to forgive, ignore, and move on, saying that he prefers to "see Ram in everyone and ignore the Ravana."

Before the film's television premiere on Sony TV, Manoj Kumar filed for a stay on the television release, at civil court in Mumbai. On 8 August 2008, he won permanent injunction on the scenes in Om Shanti Om that lampooned him. The court ordered the producers and Sony Entertainment Television, to edit the Manoj Kumar look-alike scenes before showing the film on the channel on 10 August 2008. It also ordered that the film could not be shown in any media—TV, DVD or Internet—without the scene being deleted.

=== Plagiarism allegations ===
On 7 August 2008, before its television release, scriptwriter Ajay Monga moved the Bombay High Court alleging that the basic storyline of the film was lifted from a film script he had emailed to Shah Rukh Khan in 2006. According to the petition, "Monga, along with one more writer Hemant Hegde, had registered the script with the Cine Writers Association (CWA) in September 2005. In January 2008, Cine Writers Association (CWA) rejected Monga's appeal at a special Executive Committee meeting. Thereafter, he approached the court to stay the film's screening on television. Though, on 6 August the court rejected Monga's plea for seeking a stay on the television telecast, it directed all the respondents including Shahrukh Khan, Farah Khan, Red Chillies Entertainment, Gauri Khan (director Red Chillies) and film's co-writer Mushtaq Sheikh, to file their say by the next hearing on 29 September 2008. In November 2008, the Film Writers' association sent a communication to Red Chillies and Ajay Monga that it had found similarities in Om Shanti Om and Monga's script. The similarities were more than mere coincidences according to Sooni Taraporewala who chaired a special committee that has investigated the case on behalf of the Film Writers' association. The suit was dismissed in 2013 due to insufficient evidence.

Another allegation of plagiarism came from Rinki Bhattacharya, daughter of late Bimal Roy, who directed Madhumati (1958). She threatened legal action against Red Chillies Entertainment and the producer-director of Om Shanti Om, as she felt that the film's second half was similar to Madhumati, also a rebirth saga.

It has also been noted that the spoof trailer scene featuring Akshay Kumar is entirely copied from the Swedish film Kopps, directed in 2003 by Josef Fares.

== Reception ==
=== Box office ===
Om Shanti Om opened across 1100 cinemas in 3000 prints worldwide. The film's net gross (after deducting entertainment tax) was ₹794 million (US$19.2 million) in India. The film collected $2.62 million in the United Kingdom, $3.6 million in North America, and $3.93 million collectively from the rest of the world, which resulted in total overseas collections of $10,150,000, the fourth largest of all time as of 2010. As a result of these collections, a worldwide gross of ₹150 crore (US$36.28 million) was accumulated.

=== Critical response ===
On the review aggregator website Rotten Tomatoes, 79% of 19 critics' reviews are positive, with an average rating of 7.21/10.

==== India ====
Om Shanti Om was received positively by Indian film critics. Taran Adarsh of Bollywood Hungama gave it four stars out of five and writes, "Om Shanti Om is Bollywood masala in its truest form and also, at its best" but notes, "the second half could've been crisper". Khalid Mohamed of Hindustan Times gave the film four stars out of five and appreciated the performances, observing how Rampal is "consistently first-rate as the suave villain" while Padukone is "fantastic, so surprisingly assured that you marvel at her poised debut". He notes that "the enterprise belongs to Shah Rukh Khan, who tackles comedy, high drama and action with his signature style—spontaneous and intuitively intelligent. Six-pack or no-packs, he's the entertainer of the year in this valentine to the movies."

Nikhat Kazmi of The Times of India gave the film three and a half stars out of five and writes, "Farah Khan's re-birth saga literally makes an art of retro and paints the seventies pop culture in Andy Warholish strokes". She called it an "unabashed tribute" to Karz. Raja Sen of Rediff.com gave it three and a half stars out of five and applauded the performances of Shah Rukh, Padukone and Talpade. He writes, "Om Shanti Om is an exultant, heady, joyous film reveling in Bollywood, and as at most parties where the bubbly flows free, there is much silly giggling and tremendous immaturity." He criticised the dialogues and excessive cameos in the film.

Rajeev Masand of News18 gave the film three stars out of five and writes, "Unpretentious and completely transparent in its intentions, Om Shanti Om is an entertainer in the true sense of the word, mixing up genre elements like comedy, drama, action and emotion to create a heady broth of Manmohan Desai-style exaggerated entertainment." He compliments the dialogues "which so cleverly incorporates Bollywood's oldest clichés into these characters' everyday parlance." A commentator for Indo-Asian News Service felt that Shah Rukh's acting was repetitive and writes, "He needs to curtail his unwarranted superstar mannerisms even in a total masala film like Om Shanti Om", while complimenting the performances of Padukone, Rampal and Talpade.

Sudish Kamnath of The Hindu stated that the film is "an unabashed celebration of willing suspension of disbelief, calling it a "light-hearted tribute to Hindi cinema the way we know it and love it". He praised the performances of Shah Rukh, Padukone and Talpade, while criticising Rampal and Kher. He also praised the various spoofs, especially the ones directed at Manoj Kumar, Sanjay Leela Bhansali and Abhishek Bachchan. Writing for SantaBanta.com, Subhash K. Jha gave it one star out of five and criticised the spoofs "which keeps swinging from homage to imitation with infuriating artifice", writing, "The mood is one of patronizing and condescension rather than genuine admiration for an era that's gone with the wind".

==== International ====
Tajpal Rathore of BBC gave it 4 out of 5 stars as well and stated, "Both a homage to and parody of Hindi Films, this cinematic feast delivered straight from the heart of the film industry will have you glued to your seats till the end." Mark Medley of National Post gave 3 stars and stated, "The film is a mess for all the right reasons; elements of comedy, drama, romance, action and the supernatural are packed in. But really, the plot is just a vehicle to get from one song-and-dance number to the next." AOL gave the film 3 out of 5 stars stating, "The movie consists of all the elements that are essentially called the 'navratnas' of Indian cinema – from joy to grief to romance to revenge. And she mixes these well to cook up a potboiler, which is sure to be a runaway hit."

== Accolades ==
Award	Date of ceremony (Note: Date is linked to the article about the awards held that year, wherever possible.)	Category	Recipient(s) and nominee(s)	Result	Ref.
Asian Film Awards	17 March 2008	Best Actress	Deepika Padukone	Nominated	
Asian Film Awards	17 March 2008	Best Composer	Vishal–Shekhar	Won	
Asia Pacific Screen Awards	11 November 2008	Best Feature Film	Om Shanti Om	Nominated	
CAAMFest	13–23 March 2008	Best Narrative	Om Shanti Om	Won	
Filmfare Awards	16 February 2008	Best Film	Om Shanti Om	Nominated	
Filmfare Awards	16 February 2008	Best Director	Farah Khan	Nominated	
Filmfare Awards	16 February 2008	Best Actor	Shah Rukh Khan	Nominated	
Filmfare Awards	16 February 2008	Best Actress	Deepika Padukone	Nominated	
Filmfare Awards	16 February 2008	Best Female Debut	Deepika Padukone	Won	
Filmfare Awards	16 February 2008	Best Supporting Actor	Shreyas Talpade	Nominated	
Filmfare Awards	16 February 2008	Best Music Director	Vishal–Shekhar	Nominated	
Filmfare Awards	16 February 2008	Best Lyricist	Javed Akhtar for "Main Agar Kahoon"	Nominated	
Filmfare Awards	16 February 2008	Best Lyricist	Vishal Dadlani for "Ajab Si"	Nominated	
Filmfare Awards	16 February 2008	Best Playback Singer	KK for "Ajab Si"	Nominated	
Filmfare Awards	16 February 2008	Best Playback Singer	Sonu Nigam for "Main Agar Kahoon"	Nominated	
Filmfare Awards	16 February 2008	Best Special Effects	Red Chillies VFX	Won	
International Indian Film Academy Awards	6–8 June 2008	Best Film	Om Shanti Om	Nominated	
International Indian Film Academy Awards	6–8 June 2008	Best Director	Farah Khan	Nominated	
International Indian Film Academy Awards	6–8 June 2008	Best Actor	Shah Rukh Khan	Nominated	
International Indian Film Academy Awards	6–8 June 2008	Best Actress	Deepika Padukone	Nominated	
International Indian Film Academy Awards	6–8 June 2008	Star Debut of the Year	Deepika Padukone	Won	
International Indian Film Academy Awards	6–8 June 2008	Best Supporting Actor	Shreyas Talpade	Nominated	
International Indian Film Academy Awards	6–8 June 2008	Best Villain	Arjun Rampal	Nominated	
International Indian Film Academy Awards	6–8 June 2008	Best Lyrics	Javed Akhtar for "Main Agar Kahoon"	Won	
International Indian Film Academy Awards	6–8 June 2008	Best Art Direction	Sabu Cyril	Won	
International Indian Film Academy Awards	6–8 June 2008	Best Costume Design	Team	Won	
International Indian Film Academy Awards	6–8 June 2008	Best Makeup	Team	Won	
International Indian Film Academy Awards	6–8 June 2008	Best Special Effects	Team	Won	
National Film Awards	21 October 2009	Best Art Direction	Sabu Cyril	Won	
Neuchâtel International Fantastic Film Festival	1 July 2008 – 6 July 2008	Mad Movies	Om Shanti Om	Won	
Producers Guild Film Awards	30 March 2008	Best Performance in a Negative Role	Arjun Rampal	Nominated	
Producers Guild Film Awards	30 March 2008	Best Debut (Female)	Deepika Padukone	Won	
Producers Guild Film Awards	30 March 2008	Best Lyricist	KK for "Ajab Si"	Nominated	
Producers Guild Film Awards	30 March 2008	Best Music	Vishal–Shekhar	Nominated	
Producers Guild Film Awards	30 March 2008	Best Lyrics	Vishal Dadlani for "Ajab Si"	Nominated	
Producers Guild Film Awards	30 March 2008	Best Re-Recording	Kuldeep Sood	Nominated	
Producers Guild Film Awards	30 March 2008	Best Choreography	Farah Khan	Won	
Producers Guild Film Awards	30 March 2008	Best Costume Design	Karan Johar	Won	
Producers Guild Film Awards	30 March 2008	Best Editing	Shirish Kunder	Nominated	
Producers Guild Film Awards	30 March 2008	Best Art Director	Sabu Cyril	Nominated	
Producers Guild Film Awards	30 March 2008	Best Special Effects	Red Chillies VFX	Won	
Screen Awards	23 January 2008	Best Film	Om Shanti Om	Nominated	
Screen Awards	23 January 2008	Best Director	Farah Khan	Nominated	
Screen Awards	23 January 2008	Best Actor in a Negative Role	Arjun Rampal	Nominated	
Screen Awards	23 January 2008	Best Male Playback Singer	KK for "Ajab Si"	Nominated	
Screen Awards	23 January 2008	Best Background Music	Vishal–Shekhar	Nominated	
Screen Awards	23 January 2008	Best Special Effects	Red Chillies VFX	Nominated	
Screen Awards	23 January 2008	Best Art Direction	Sabu Cyril	Nominated	
Screen Awards	23 January 2008	Best Choreography	Farah Khan	Won	
Screen Awards	23 January 2008	Most Promising Newcomer	Deepika Padukone	Won	
Screen Awards	23 January 2008	Best Pair of the Year	Shah Rukh Khan & Deepika Padukone	Won	
Stardust Awards	26 January 2008	Superstar of Tomorrow-Female	Deepika Padukone	Nominated	
Stardust Awards	26 January 2008	Breakthrough Performance-Male	Shreyas Talpade	Won	
Stardust Awards	26 January 2008	Best Actor in a Negative Role	Arjun Rampal	Won	
Stardust Awards	26 January 2008	Star of the Year-Male	Shah Rukh Khan	Nominated	
Stardust Awards	26 January 2008	Dream Director	Farah Khan	Won	
Stardust Awards	26 January 2008	Best Film	Om Shanti Om	Nominated	
Zee Cine Awards	26 April 2008	Best Film	Om Shanti Om	Nominated	
Zee Cine Awards	26 April 2008	Best Actor	Shah Rukh Khan	Nominated	
Zee Cine Awards	26 April 2008	Best Actress	Deepika Padukone	Nominated	
Zee Cine Awards	26 April 2008	Best Director	Farah Khan	Nominated	
Zee Cine Awards	26 April 2008	Best Actor in a Supporting Role	Shreyas Talpade	Nominated	
Zee Cine Awards	26 April 2008	Best Actor in a Negative Role	Arjun Rampal	Won	
Zee Cine Awards	26 April 2008	Most Popular Track of the Year	"Dard-e-Disco"	Nominated	
Zee Cine Awards	26 April 2008	Best Male Playback Singer	KK for "Ajab Si"	Nominated	
Zee Cine Awards	26 April 2008	Best Male Playback Singer	Sonu Nigam for "Main Agar Kahoon"	Nominated	
Zee Cine Awards	26 April 2008	Best Lyricist	Javed Akhtar for "Main Agar Kahoon"	Nominated	
Zee Cine Awards	26 April 2008	Best Music Director	Vishal–Shekhar	Nominated	
Zee Cine Awards	26 April 2008	Most Promising Debut	Deepika Padukone	Won	
Zee Cine Awards	26 April 2008	Best Choreography	Farah Khan	Won	
Zee Cine Awards	26 April 2008	Best Costume Design	Karan Johar	Won	
Zee Cine Awards	26 April 2008	Best VFX	Red Chillies VFX	Won	

== Legacy and Impact ==
Nina Davuluri's talent for Miss America 2014 was a Hindi film fusion dance choreographed by Nakul Dev Mahajan and performed to Dhoom Taana. It was the first time Indian film ever appeared on the Miss America stage and Davuluri is the first Indian American to win the competition.

In Japan in 2017, Om Shanti Om was remade into a musical, performed by the all-female troupe Takarazuka Revue, titled Oomu Shanti Oumu.

A book, titled The Making of Om Shanti Om written by Mushtaq Sheikh, was released after the release of the film. The book gives an insight into the production and happenings behind the camera of the film.

== See also ==
- Reincarnation in popular culture
