= Main Hoon Na =

2004 Indian film by Farah Khan

- Theatrical release poster
- Directed by: Farah Khan
- Screenplay by: Farah Khan; Abbas Tyrewala; Rajesh Saathi
- Dialogues by: Abbas Tyrewala
- Story by: Farah Khan
- Produced by: Gauri Khan; Ratan Jain
- Starring: Shah Rukh Khan; Sushmita Sen; Zayed Khan; Amrita Rao; Suniel Shetty
- Cinematography: V. Manikandan
- Edited by: Shirish Kunder
- Music by: Score: Ranjit Barot; Songs: Anu Malik
- Production companies: Red Chillies Entertainment; Venus Movies
- Distributed by: Eros International; Shree Ashtavinayak Cine Vision
- Release date: 30 April 2004
- Running time: 182 minutes
- Country: India
- Language: Hindi
- Box office: ₹89.7 crore

Main Hoon Na (transl. I'm there) is a 2004 Indian Hindi-language masala film co-written and directed by Farah Khan (in her directorial debut) and produced by Gauri Khan and Ratan Jain under the banners of Red Chillies Entertainment and Venus Movies. The film stars Shah Rukh Khan, Sushmita Sen, Amrita Rao, Zayed Khan, and Suniel Shetty alongside Kabir Bedi, Naseeruddin Shah, Boman Irani, and Kirron Kher. The film follows Major Ram Prasad Sharma, an Indian Army officer, sent on a covert mission to pose as a college student and protect the general's daughter from a dangerous rogue soldier and reunite with his father's long lost family.

Development for the film began in 2001; however, it faced a number of delays during production. Main Hoon Na is notable for approaching the Indo-Pakistani conflict from a neutral perspective. Filming took place at St. Paul's School and the surrounding state of West Bengal. The film is also the first production of Red Chillies Entertainment.

Main Hoon Na was released on 30 April 2004 to positive reviews from critics and became a commercial success by grossing ₹84 crore, thus becoming the second highest-grossing Indian film of 2004, only surpassed by another Shah Rukh Khan-starrer Veer-Zaara.

At the 50th Filmfare Awards, Main Hoon Na received 12 nominations, including Best Film, Best Director (Farah), Best Actor (Shah Rukh), Best Supporting Actress (Rao), Best Supporting Actor (Zayed) and Best Villain (Shetty), winning Best Music Director (Anu Malik). A snippet of "Lament" from Light of Aiden (Celtic Version) is used throughout the film.

== Plot ==
India launches Project Milaap, a Pakistan prisoners release program, in an attempt to de-escalate tensions between the two nations. Expectation was that once India takes the first step, Pakistan may reciprocate. Raghavan Dutta, a former Indian special forces soldier discharged for executing Pakistani citizens in revenge for his son's death, runs a militant group with a former comrade, Captain Khan, where he sets against peace between the two rival countries. During a press conference, Raghavan attempts to shoot General Amarjeet Bakshi, but Brigadier Shekhar Sharma takes the bullet for him. On his deathbed, Shekhar informs his son, Major Ram Prasad, that his wife and Ram's stepmother, Madhu, and their son and Ram's half-brother, Lakshman Prasad, had abandoned him 20 years ago, as Shekhar had cheated on Madhu with Ram's late biological mother. Shekhar requests Ram to reconcile with his estranged family and that his ashes will be immersed by both his sons, stating that he can finally be at peace only if his family forgives him.

Meanwhile, General Bakshi sends Ram on an undercover operation to protect his estranged daughter, Sanjana, who is studying at St. Paul's College in Darjeeling. Ram reluctantly accepts when Bakshi informs him that Lakshman is also studying in the same college. Bakshi convinces Ram to enter the college as a student than as a teacher, in order to better watch over Sanjana. Upon arriving, Ram struggles with adjusting to college life as he is much older than all the students, including some professors. Ram encounters Sanjana and her crush, Lucky, but both do not want to be near him due to his age. A college student helps Ram hack the college computer to find out Lakshman's identity, only to learn that Lucky is actually his half-brother Lakshman. During a race to capture the college flag from the roof, Lucky ends up hanging off the roof of the university, but Ram heroically saves his life. As a result, both Lucky and Sanjana agree to befriend Ram, who soon moves in with Lucky and Madhu as well. Outside a theatre, Ram saves one of his classmates, Percy, from an attempted murder by Khan, and captures Khan in the process. However, Ram's own identity is discovered by Raghavan, who then arrives at the university masquerading as the new physics professor after his gang kidnaps Madhav Rasai, a physics professor, and threatens him to resign and recommend Raghavan as "Professor Raghav Dutta" in his place.

Ram also brings Madhu and Lakshman closer by helping them bond during his stay there. Meanwhile, Ram falls in love with his chemistry professor, Chandni, while Lucky also falls in love with Sanjana after Ram and Chandni give her a makeover. During a prom, Ram thwarts Raghavan's gang from abducting Chandni. After meeting with Sanjana, Ram requests Raghavan to drop them both off with her father at her hostel, where Sanjana reconciles with her father. After that night, Sanjana and Chandni discover Ram's true identity as an army officer. At the same time, Raghavan learns about Ram and Lucky's relationship and reveals Ram's true identity to Lucky and Madhu.

On being confronted by Lucky and Madhu, Ram breaks the news of Shekhar's death and informs them that Shekhar's last wish was that they reconcile. As they are unwilling to accept him yet, Ram leaves their home and the university, but his revelation shocks them. Later, Raghavan holds the whole university hostage and demands the cancellation of Project Milaap along with the return of Captain Khan and Ram as hostages in exchange for all the students' and teachers' lives. On being informed about this situation, Ram immediately returns to the university; along the way he encounters Madhu and apologizes to her for having concealed his true identity.

At the university, Ram informs Khan that Raghavan is doing nothing for the country and is only carrying out a misplaced feud on the Pakistanis for killing his son, and offers an opportunity to Khan to do something for the country. Accompanying Khan, Ram enters the building and gets subsequently shot by Khan. Ram survives, and Khan informs him that his heart has changed regarding his allegiances and proceeds to kill the guards, thus freeing the students. Raghavan shoots Khan dead at point blank range for his betrayal. During a prolonged combat between Ram and Raghavan, Ram finally kills Raghavan by removing the safety pin from the latter's hand grenade.

Lucky helps Ram escape from the ensuing explosion from aboard a helicopter and the two happily embrace each other as brothers. Project Milaap is a success and all the prisoners are exchanged triumphantly. Ram and Lucky immerse Shekhar's ashes together with Madhu tearfully looking on. In the end, Lucky and Ram finally graduate, and the entire university rejoices.

== Cast ==
- Shah Rukh Khan as Major Ram Prasad Sharma
- Zayed Khan as Lakshman Prasad Sharma "Lucky", Sanju's love interest and Ram's step-brother
- Sushmita Sen as Chandni Chopra, Ram, Sanjana, and Lucky's chemistry professor; Ram’s love interest
- Amrita Rao as Sanjana Bakshi, Amarjeet's daughter and Lucky's love interest
- Suniel Shetty as Raghavan Dutta
- Naseeruddin Shah as Brigadier Shekhar Prasad Sharma, Ram and Lucky's father (special appearance)
- Kirron Kher as Madhu Sharma, Ram's stepmother and Lucky's mother
- Kabir Bedi as General Amarjeet Bakshi, Sanju's father and Ram's superior officer
- Boman Irani as Yogendra "Yogi" Agarwal, college principal
- Bindu as Mrs. Sonali Kakkar
- Satish Shah as Professor Madhav Rasai
- Murali Sharma as Captain Khan, an ex-army Captain and Raghavan's second-in-command
- Nassar Abdullah as Rajat Saxena, Project Milaap's TV host
- Kunal Kumar as Baman Shastri, Ram's friend.
- Rakhi Sawant as Mini
- Praveen Sirohi as Vivek
- Rajiv Panjabi as Percy
- Shaji Choudhary as Johan
- Tabu as Aparna (uncredited cameo appearance)
- Geeta Kapoor as girl dancing in the song "Gori Gori" (cameo appearance)
- Sajid Khan as band member in the song "Gori Gori" (cameo appearance)
- Farah Khan as herself (cameo appearance)

== Production ==
=== Development ===
Development for the film had begun in 2001. Filming was scheduled to begin in October 2001, but later that year, Shah Rukh Khan had injured himself while shooting for Shakti: The Power (2002), and had to be treated in the UK, leading to the film being shelved. Farah Khan revived the film in 2003 following Khan's recovery. Farah initially titled the film as The Outsider but changed it upon the suggestion of her friends. Khan was unhappy with the film's title at that time, believing it was too short, but changed his mind upon listening to the film's title song.

=== Casting ===
Upon the film's revival in 2003, Hrithik Roshan, Sohail Khan, and Abhishek Bachchan were all offered to play the role of Lucky. None of the three accepted due to unknown reasons, leading to Zayed Khan getting cast. Ameesha Patel was offered the role of Sanju, but declined due to date issues, as did newcomer Ayesha Takia, after which Amrita Rao was cast.

Shah Rukh Khan asked Farah Khan to approach Kamal Haasan for the role of Raghavan since Haasan owed him a favor for his role in Hey Ram. Haasan returned down the role citing that it would portray him as an anti-national. Suniel Shetty was then cast.

== Soundtrack ==
Main Hoon Na

Soundtrack album by Anu Malik
- Released: 27 February 2004
- Recorded: YRF Studios (Mumbai)
- Genre: Feature film soundtrack
- Language: Hindi
- Label: T-Series
- Producer: Anu Malik

Anu Malik chronology
Munna Bhai M.B.B.S. (2003)	Main Hoon Na (2004)	Vaah! Life Ho Toh Aisi! (2005)

The film's music was composed by Anu Malik, with lyrics written by Javed Akhtar. The soundtrack earned Malik his second Filmfare Award for Best Music Director. According to the Indian trade website Box Office India, with around 2.1 million units sold, the film's soundtrack album was one of the highest selling Bollywood soundtracks of the year. Sonu Nigam received several award nominations and won an MTV Immies Best Male Playback Singer Award.

=== Track listing ===
No.	Title	Singer(s)	Length
1.	"Main Hoon Na"	Sonu Nigam, Shreya Ghoshal	06:02
2.	"Tumse Milke Dilka Jo Haal"	Sonu Nigam, Altaf Sabri, Hashim Sabri, Ravi Khote	06:00
3.	"Tumhe Jo Maine Dekha"	Abhijeet Bhattacharya, Shreya Ghoshal	05:42
4.	"Gori Gori"	Sunidhi Chauhan, Shreya Ghoshal, K.K., Anu Malik	04:30
5.	"Chale Jaise Hawaien"	Vasundhara Das, K.K.	05:25
6.	"Main Hoon Na (Sad Version)"	Abhijeet Bhattacharya	04:18
7.	"Yeh Fizayein"	K.K., Alka Yagnik	05:19
8.	"Main Hoon Na (Remix)"	Ranjit Barot	02:31
Total length:			43:55

== Reception ==
Main Hoon Na received positive reviews from critics for masala genre, soundtrack, cast performances, and direction.

=== Critical reception ===
Taran Adarsh of Bollywood Hungama wrote "Main Hoon Na reinforces your faith in Bollywood commercial cinema. The film is a wholesome entertainer that has something for everyone". Jamie Russell of the BBC wrote "A bonkers 'masala' movie, Main Hoon Na could be the mutant offspring of Grease and The Matrix. Part-thriller, part high-school comedy and all Bollywood musical, it's the directorial debut of Farah Khan". Siddharth Patankar of NDTV termed the film as "an out and out entertainer. Masala, romance, family drama, and some good old fashioned dhishoom dhishoom," and was positive of the performances.

=== Box office ===
Main Hoon Na was the second-highest grossing Indian film of 2004 behind Veer-Zaara (also a Shahrukh Khan-starrer set against India-Pakistan backdrop). It made ₹480 million (US$5.0 million) in India and an additional ₹19 million (US$200,000) overseas.

== Awards and nominations ==
50th Filmfare Awards
Category	Recipients and Nominees	Results
Best Film	Red Chillies Entertainment	Nominated
Best Director	Farah Khan	Nominated
Best Actor	Shahrukh Khan	Nominated
Best Supporting Actress	Amrita Rao	Nominated
Best Supporting Actor	Zayed Khan	Nominated
Best Villain	Suniel Shetty	Nominated
Best Comedian	Boman Irani	Nominated
Best Music Director	Anu Malik	Won
Best Lyricist	Javed Akhtar	Nominated
Best Male Playback Singer	Sonu Nigam (for "Main Hoon Na")	Nominated
Best Male Playback Singer	Sonu Nigam (for "Tumse Milke")	Nominated
Best Action	Allan Amin	Nominated

Global Indian Film Awards
Category	Recipients and Nominees	Results
Best Director	Farah Khan	Won
Best Actor	Shahrukh Khan	Won
Best Villain	Suniel Shetty	Won
Best Male Playback Singer	Abhijeet Bhattacharya (for "Tumhe Jo Maine Dekha")	Won
Best Art Director	Sabu Cyril	Won
Best Action	Allan Amin	Won

International Indian Film Academy Awards
Category	Recipients and Nominees	Results
Best Director	Farah Khan	Nominated
Best Supporting Actor	Zayed Khan	Nominated
Best Villain	Suniel Shetty	Nominated
Best Debut Director	Farah Khan	Won
Best Music Director	Anu Malik	Nominated
Best Male Playback Singer	Sonu Nigam (for "Main Hoon Na")	Nominated
Best Special Effects	Rajtaru Video Sonic, Eagle Video Films	Won

Star Screen Awards
Category	Recipients and Nominees	Results
Best Supporting Actor	Zayed Khan	Nominated
Best Music Director	Anu Malik	Won
Best Lyricist	Javed Akhtar (for "Main Hoon Na")	Nominated
Best Male Playback Singer	Sonu Nigam (for "Main Hoon Na")	Won
Best Background Music	Ranjit Barot	Nominated
Best Choreography	Farah Khan (for "Gori Gori")	Nominated
Best Action	Allan Amin	Nominated
Best Publicity Design	Rahul Nanda and Himanshu Nanda	Nominated
Best Sound Recording	Shirish Kunder and Rakesh Ranjan	Nominated

Zee Cine Awards
Category	Recipients and Nominees	Results
Best Film (Critics)	Red Chillies Entertainment	Nominated
Best Director	Farah Khan	Nominated
Best Actor (Critics)	Shahrukh Khan	Nominated
Best Supporting Actress	Sushmita Sen	Nominated
Most Promising Director	Farah Khan	Won
Best Female Debut	Farah Khan	Won
Best Music Director	Anu Malik	Won
Best Male Playback Singer	Sonu Nigam (for "Main Hoon Na")	Nominated
Best Track of the Year	"Tumse Milke"	Nominated
Best Background Score	Ranjit Barot	Nominated
Best Art Direction	Sabu Cyril	Nominated
Best Costume Design	Karan Johar and Manish Malhotra	Nominated

== Remake ==
The film was remade in Tamil as Aegan which released on 27 October 2008.
