= Housefull (film series) =

Indian comedy film series

Housefull franchise
- Film series logo
- Created by: Sajid Nadiadwala; Sajid Khan
- Original work: Housefull (2010)
- Owner: Nadiadwala Grandson Entertainment
- Years: 2010–present

Films and television
- Films: Housefull (2010); Housefull 2 (2012); Housefull 3 (2016); Housefull 4 (2019); Housefull 5 (2025)

Audio
- Soundtracks: Housefull (2010); Housefull 2 (2012); Housefull 3 (2016); Housefull 4 (2019); Housefull 5 (2025)

Miscellaneous
- Portrayer: Akshay Kumar; Ritesh Deshmukh; Chunky Panday

Housefull is an Indian comedy film series. The first two, Housefull and Housefull 2, were directed by Sajid Khan; the third, Housefull 3, by Sajid-Farhad; the fourth, Housefull 4, by Farhad Samji; and the fifth with two prints, Housefull 5A and Housefull 5B, by Tarun Mansukhani. The series is produced by Sajid Nadiadwala under his banner Nadiadwala Grandson Entertainment. Each film starts with a fresh story unrelated with the preceding film's story. All five films in the series have starred Akshay Kumar, Riteish Deshmukh and Chunky Panday, four have featured Jacqueline Fernandez, three have featured Boman Irani, Ranjeet, and Johnny Lever, and two have featured Malaika Arora, Nikitin Dheer, Randhir Kapoor, Nargis Fakhri, Abhishek Bachchan, Vindu Dara Singh, Shreyas Talpade, Bobby Deol, and Jackie Shroff in either cameos, special appearances, supporting roles, or lead roles.

Despite a generally mixed-negative critical reception, the series has been commercially successful, grossing over ₹1000 crore worldwide. It is currently the highest-grossing comedy franchise in Indian cinema, as well as one of the highest-grossing Indian film series of all time.

== Films and overview ==
Film	Release date	Director(s)	Writer(s)	Story	Producer	Installment(s)	Note(s)
Housefull	30 April 2010	Sajid Khan	Milap Zaveri; Sajid Khan; Vibha Singh; Anvita Dutt	Sajid Nadiadwala	Sajid Nadiadwala	First Installment	Housefull film series
Housefull 2	5 April 2012	Sajid Khan	Sajid Khan; Tushar Hiranandani; Sajid-Farhad	Sajid Nadiadwala	Sajid Nadiadwala	Second Installment	Housefull film series
Housefull 3	3 June 2016	Sajid-Farhad	Sajid-Farhad; Rajan Agarwal	K. Subash; Jitendra Parmar	Sajid Nadiadwala	Third Installment	Housefull film series
Housefull 4	25 October 2019	Farhad Samji	Aakash Kaushik; Madhur Sharma; Farhad Samji; Tushar Hiranandani; Sparsh Khetarpal; Tasha Bhambra	Sara Bodinar	Sajid Nadiadwala	Fourth Installment	Housefull film series
Housefull 5 (A&B)	6 June 2025	Tarun Mansukhani	Tarun Mansukhani; Farhad Samji	Sajid Nadiadwala	Sajid Nadiadwala	Fifth and Final Installment	Housefull film series

=== Housefull (2010 film) ===
Aarush, is a jinxed loser who stays with his friend, Bob and his wife, Hetal, both working at a casino owned by Mr. Kishore Samtani. Although at first Hetal is displeased with Aarush's presence, he proves to be a kind-hearted man looking for family. Bob and Hetal decide to get him married to their boss' daughter, Devika Samtani. After the marriage, on their honeymoon in Italy, Devika leaves him for her long-time American boyfriend Benny. Dejected, Aarush tries to commit suicide by drowning in the sea but is saved by a girl Sandy.

Sandy originally thinks Aarush is a pervert, but when Aakhri Pasta, the owner of Italy's biggest hotel where Aarush was spending his honeymoon with Devika, tells Sandy that Aarush is a widower, she befriends him and slowly falls in love with him. What she does not know, is that Aakhri Pasta was only joking. She then finds out his wife is alive and leaves him, but he tells her the whole truth to make her understand and she accepts him.

The only way Aarush can marry Sandy is by convincing her elder brother, Major Krishna Rao, a strict Indian Military Intelligence officer who loves and is over-protective of Sandy. Meanwhile, Hetal, in an attempt to reconcile, lies to her father, Batuk Patel, that Bob owns a mansion and they have a child. The four rent a mansion to make him believe that Bob owns it, but Batuk accidentally believes that Aarush is married to Hetal, and Bob is the cook. Then, Krishna turns up, much to Aarush's horror, leading to more lies.

For half of the term, the four must pretend that the mansion is owned by Bob, and the rest must pretend that Aarush owns it. An overly suspicious Krishna sees Bob and Hetal working at the casino and uses a lie detector to find the truth. After Sandy objects, Krishna apologises and agrees to Aarush and Sandy's marriage. The whole family is invited to the Royal Palace, to see Krishna get rewarded by the Queen of England. While this is happening, 2 workers are meant to be installing air conditioning gas for the place, however instead they accidentally supply the hall with laughing gas causing everyone to break into an outburst of laughter. During this laughter, the truth is let out but no one seems to be in the right state of mind.

The two workers meanwhile stop the gas from spreading – everyone comes back to their senses. Aarush tells everyone the truth and states all his life he had felt like an unlucky loser and has had the most horrible luck. leaves the altar in tears. However Krishna stops him and tells him that he lied, saying he was cursed, stating no man that his sister loves is cursed. In the end, Hetal and Bob live together with Batuk Patel, and Aarush's luck changes for the better.

=== Housefull 2 (2012 film) ===
The two cousins Heena and Bobby, daughters of the Kapoor family, hate each other very much. They start quarrelling over something relating to their duties of Animals' Law Authority. Their fathers, Chintu and Dabboo, are step-brothers who hate each other to the very core. Even their wives hate each other. Chintu wants the richest son-in law for his daughter, Heena, while Dabboo too wants the same for his daughter, Bobby. Aakhri Pasta, a marriage counsellor, is ordered by both Chintu and Dabboo to find the best son-in-law. Aakhri Pasta brings Mr. Babani to discuss Babani's son Jai.

When Chintu misinterprets one of Aakhri's comments, he verbally abuses Babani while shouting. Babani suffers from a condition that affects his heart when he hears loud noises. Due to Chintu's shouting, Babani suffers a heart attack, landing him in a hospital. Babani's son Jai learns of this, is angered, then vows revenge, telling his friend Jolly/Jwala, who is the son of billionaire J.D., to go to Chintu, agree to marry his daughter and then break off the wedding at the last minute. Jolly is busy trying to introduce his girlfriend to his own father and does not want to get involved. He suggests Max, their former college mate and a thief, to do the job. Jay goes with Max as his driver but somehow, they end in the wrong house and go to Dabboo's house.

Jay and Max later find out their mistake. Jai, still wanting revenge, does not know what to do and Jolly suggests another former sleazy college mate, Sunny. Jolly goes with Sunny as his bodyguard because Max and Sunny are sworn enemies and as Dabboo's house and Chintu's house are right next to each other, their plan may get destroyed. Sunny and Jolly encounter a crocodile and Max and Jay encounter a snake. They manage to survive the attack.

While Heena and Bobby are on a cruise, they accidentally end up on an island. Max and Sunny become friends again, while Heena and Bobby become friends. They find a resort and go home. Dabboo gets Jolly (Max) engaged to Bobby and Chintu gets Jolly (Sunny) engaged to Heena. The day of the engagement, Chintu blindfolds Jolly, Sunny, Jai and Heena and takes them to J.D.'s house. After seeing the real Jolly holding Sunny's garland, J.D. believes that Jolly got engaged to Heena. Luckily, Sunny convinces him. Jolly calls them at midnight and reveals his father's secret of being Jagga Daaku. He also reveals that his real name is Jwala. After Sunny fools Chintu, Chintu calls Dabboo in excitement and tells him that his daughter, Heena, is marrying Jolly, the son of J.D. Confused, and believing Max to be Jolly, Dabboo takes Max and Bobby to J.D.'s mansion. Sunny handles the situation well by fooling J.D. by taking the name of his religion and tells him that Max is Jolly's friend and Bobby is Max's fiancé (though actually it is true) and Max's father is against his and Bobby's marriage. J.D. then welcomes Bobby, Max and her family to his house and tells them to stay there up to Bobby and Max's marriage.

Batuk Patel arrives with his daughter Parul to make things worse. Jay and Jwala come to receive them from the airport. But when they see Parul, Jay and Jwala lie that Jay is Jolly. Parul becomes happy hearing this as they secretly love each other. Jelo gives Jwala the ultimatum – "take me to your house or forget me". To help Jwala, Sunny lies to J.D., saying that Jelo is his fiancé, and J.D. again agrees to let her live there as Sunny takes the name of his religion. Sunny and Max lie to their respective fathers-in-law that the other man is the son of J.D. and a maid servant in the mansion. This creates much confusion.

When Sunny's father as well as Max's 'Guru' tells them never to break anyone's heart, Sunny and Max tell the truth to Heena and Bobby. Enraged, Bobby and Heena slap Max and Sunny respectively and tell them that they never want to see their faces again. But thinking that instead of telling the truth, Sunny and Max could have done more wrong with them, the two sisters pardon the two boys on the very next day. There Jay and Jolly also let off their plan of revenge on Kapoors on Jay's father's advice. Then Henna proposes Sunny in Sunny's style and Bobby proposes Max in Max's style.

On the day of the four couples' marriage, J.D. and the other brides' fathers learn the truth about the grooms and that they have been lying all this time. Finally Bobby and Heena convince their fathers to forget their enmity and live together as blood brothers. Chintu and Dabboo join hands and so do their wives. But J.D. was not convinced by them telling the truth, so he turns back into Jagga Daku and starts frightening the families with his gun. He tries to shoot Sunny with his gun as Sunny runs towards J.D. to save him from the falling chandelier and then he understands what was happening. In the end, all the grooms marry their respective girlfriends.

=== Housefull 3 (2016 film) ===
Six years ago in London, three robbers attempted to steal jewels from a building, but were stopped by the police and arrested. In the present, Batook Patel is a wealthy and successful businessman with three beautiful daughters: Ganga, Jamuna, and Saraswati. However, he does not want his daughters to marry, as he claims that all the women in his family are cursed if they marry.

One night, at a friend's bachelorette party, the girls reveal to their friend that secretly, they each have a boyfriend. Jamuna's boyfriend is Teddy, who is a race car driver. Saraswati's boyfriend is Bunty, who is a rapper. Ganga's boyfriend is Sandy, who wants to be a professional football/soccer player. Sandy learns that he is suffering from Dissociative Identity Disorder and his 'Sundi' comes out whenever he hears the word "Indian". His disorder comes from being depressed about not having enough money to make a living. Sandy sees Batook's success in the paper, and decides to date his doctor who is Batook's daughter, Ganga. When the girls tell their dad that they each have a boyfriend, Batook goes to his friend, Aakhri Pasta, who owns an Italian restaurant. Batook convinces Pasta to dress up as the family's fortune teller, Aakhri Aasta. Aasta claims that when Ganga's boyfriend first steps foot into Batook's house, Jamuna's boyfriend first sees Batook, or when Saraswati's boyfriend first speaks to Batook, then Batook will have a heart attack, and die. The girls, wanting to keep their boyfriends, have them fake disabilities. Sandy rides around in a motorised wheelchair, and claims he cannot use his feet. Teddy wears sunglasses and uses a cane, and claims he is blind. Bunty uses sign language, and claims that he is mute. Batook decides to test the boys to make sure if they are really disabled, by putting ants in Sandy's pants, having Teddy jump in an empty pool, and injuring Bunty to see if he screams. When Batook is out of the house, the boys reveal themselves to each other as not being disabled. Since they all want Batook's money, they decide not to tell on each other, as they each have a recording of the other. At Pasta's restaurant, Batook reveals to Pasta that his daughters are actually the daughters of Urja Nagre, an underworld crime lord. Nagre was caught when someone informed the police. While in jail, Nagre requested Batook take care of his daughters in London, but make sure that they never found out that Nagre was their father. Batook also reveals that he was the one who informed the police, and did not want the girls to marry until his sons (the robbers in the beginning of the film) got out of prison. Unbeknownst to him, Nagre is out of prison, and has arrived in London.

The boys go into town, where they encounter Nagre. The boys claim interchangeably of their disabilities in front of him. Bunty as crippled. Sandy as blind, and Teddy as mute. Later, Nagre goes to Batook's office, and ask him about his daughters's future husbands. Batook says that while the girls' future husbands are disabled, he knows three normal men who are suitable for the daughters. Batook takes Nagre to a Gurdwara to see his sons, Rishi, Rohan, and Rajeev, claiming they are orphans who do community service. Nagre decides that the three are suitable for his daughters. They make a plan.

At Batook's house, Nagre claims that Batook owes Nagre 5000 crores (50 billion) of British Pounds. Nagre gives Batook and the boys ten days to make up the money, or Ganga, Jamuna, and Saraswati must marry Rishi, Rohan, and Rajeev. During these 10 days, Nagre and his "sons" will also live in Batook's house, meaning that while in front of both Batook and Nagre, Sandy, Teddy, and Bunty must act as blind-disabled, mute-blind, and disabled-mute. Sandy, Teddy, and Bunty come up with a plan to get rid of Nagre's sons. During a St. Patrick's Day party, the girls get Rishi, Rohan, and Rajeev drunk. The next day, they tell each other that they had sex with their respective girls, only to find out that they had sex with the maids. The maids request compensation, or they will sue, of 50 million Pounds. Nagre, learning this, says that the girls will marry the boys of their choosing.

The next day, the girls take Sandy, Teddy, and Bunty to church, asking for forgiveness. Saraswati, who takes care of disabled children, tells them that two boys were mocking a child because of his disability. The girls feel guilty, because they felt that they were mocking people with disabilities by having the boys act as if they were blind, crippled, and mute. After this, the boys feel guilty, as they were only marrying the girls for money. But now, they actually loved them.

They go to the warehouse area of Madame Tussaud's to meet their girlfriends. They instead find Batook's sons, who explain that they found out the boys were normal. While Teddy and Bunty fight Batook's sons' gang members, Sandy accidentally heard "Indian", and Sundi, tries to kill Sandy. Batook arrives, and blackmails the boys that Nagre's fortune of 50 million will be divided into 7 parts: Rishi, Rohan, Rajeev, Batook, Sandy, Teddy, and Bunty's shares. Consequently, more wealth takers arrive, namely Sundi (Sandy's second personality), Aakhri Pasta, Batook's three maids and their three unborn babies. Nagre then arrives, and explains that he found a recording on Bunty's laptop, which revealed that Bunty, Sandy, and Teddy were not disabled. Nagre also overheard Batook, who told his sons that he was responsible for Nagre's incarceration. A comical sequence then takes place as Nagre attempts to kill everyone in the warehouse. As the girls arrive, Rishi, Rohan, and Rajeev see them, and hold them at knifepoint in front of Nagre. Sandy, Teddy, and Bunty then rush to save the girls, injuring themselves in the process. As they lay in the girls arms, the boys tell the truth to the girls, and Batook explains how Nagre is their father. The girls forgive the boys, and reconcile with Nagre.

=== Housefull 4 (2019 film) ===
Harry is a barber who frequently has bizarre flashes of a past era. He runs a barber shop in London with his brothers Roy and Max. The three brothers had misplaced a bag of 5 million pounds which belonged to gangster Michael Bhai. His henchman Big Bhai constantly demands the money. To fulfil this demand, the three brothers get engaged to the three daughters of London's rich business tycoon Thakral (Ranjeet): Harry is dating Pooja, Roy is dating Neha and Max is dating Kriti. Mysterious circumstances cause the destination wedding to take place in Sitamgarh, India. On arriving in Sitamgarh, Aakhri Pasta, a bellboy at their hotel, recognises them as reincarnations of people that lived 600 years ago, i.e. in 1419. Harry realises that the flashes he sees have something to do with what Pasta was talking about and drives to the nearby town of Madhavgarh, where he starts to see the flashes clearly.

In 1419, Rajkumar Bala Dev Singh of Madhavgarh was banished by his father, Maharaj Parikshitap, since Bala tried to kill him to become King. Bala's servant Pehla Pasta informs him of Sitamgarh - a nearby kingdom whose King, Maharaj Surya Singh Rana, is looking for grooms for his three daughters: Rajkumari Madhu, Rajkumari Mala and Rajkumari Meena. Bala plans to marry Rajkumari Madhu, the eldest Princess, so that he becomes the King of Sitamgarh.

Bala meets Bangdu Maharaj, an effeminate dance teacher who has an affair with Mala. Meena is secretly in love with the brave bodyguard of the three princesses, Dharamputra. Bala helps the two couples get together and enlists their help for uniting him with Madhu. The plan works and Maharaj Surya Singh Rana announces the wedding of Madhu with Bala, Mala with Bangdu Maharaj, and Meena with Dharamputra. However, Suryabhan, Surya Singh Rana's nephew, wants the throne for himself. He kills the brother of Sitamgarh's enemy clan's leader, Gama and frames the three couples for it. On the day of the wedding, Gama storms into the fort and fights them to avenge his brother. During the fight, Bala realises that he now truly loves Madhu, even though initially she was just the path to the throne for him. During the fight, the wedding mandap (altar) collapses and kills the three couples along with Gama.

Back in the present, Harry realises that the grooms are about to marry the wrong brides. Pasta helps Harry remind Roy and Max of their lives as Bangdu Maharaj and Dharamputra, respectively. Just then, they are introduced to Pappu Rangeela, a qawwali singer and a family friend of the girls. He is the reincarnation of Gama but has no recollection of his past life. Meanwhile, Pasta finds a painting of their past lives' wedding day which shows Bala with Madhu, Bangdu with Mala, and Dharamputra with Meena. Before they can show this painting to the girls to remind them of their past lives, it gets in the hands of Pappu Rangeela and he remembers his life as Gama.

Pappu crashes the wedding and a fight ensues. The fight makes Pooja and Neha remember everything. Soon, Michael Bhai, now revealed to be the reincarnation of Suryabhan, shows up at the wedding for his money and shoots Gama. Kriti remembers everything when she sees Michael Bhai and also tells everyone that the wedding mandap had not collapsed on its own – it was broken down by Suryabhan to kill everyone so that he could become King. Michael Bhai recounts his past life and boasts how he got Gama's brother killed. Pappu Rangeela hears this and pushes Michael Bhai into the collapsing mandap, thus getting his revenge.

The film ends on a happy note with Harry, Roy and Max marrying Kriti, Pooja and Neha, thus completing their 600-year-old love story.

=== Housefull 5 (A&B) (2025 film) ===
On his 100th birthday, billionaire Ranjeet Dobriyal hosts a lavish party on a luxury cruise ship. Attending are his son Dev, adopted son Shiraz, loyal bodyguard Batuk, CFO Maya, the cunning and enigmatic COO Bedi, the ship's captain Sameer, and other guests. During the celebration, as the ship sets sail, Ranjeet suddenly dies of a heart attack.

Fearing the news will cause Ranjeet group's stock to plummet, Dev and the board decide to keep his death a secret. However, Ranjeet's lawyer Lucy activates his holographic will, revealing that his entire £69 billion fortune is left to his son Jolly from his first marriage to Shakuntala Devi. The will specifies bizarre identifiers for Jolly: he is left-handed, married to a foreigner, and has a very distinctive scar on his butt.

Soon, three men—Jalabuddin, Jalbushan, and Julius—arrive with their wives, each claiming to be Jolly and providing identical proof. Unable to determine the true heir, Dev suggests a DNA test. Chaos erupts when the ship's clown, Aakhri Pasta, attempts to drug Batuk by spiking his drink, but the drink is accidentally mixed into the communal punch, causing everyone to lose consciousness.

The next morning, the three men wake up in the wrong cabins, with the wrong wives, and no memory of the previous night. The situation worsens when the doctor assigned to perform the DNA test is found murdered. Suspicion falls on the three men and their wives, and Dev orders them all locked in the ship's jail until Interpol arrives.

The men confess to each other that they are all impostors and none of the women are their real wives. It is then revealed that Julius is a private detective hired by Ranjeet to find his son, the real Jolly. However, when Julius learned about Jolly's characteristics, he decided to take Jolly's identity. He then told his plan to his wife Kanchi, who was secretly the girlfriend of Jalabuddin. However, since Kanchi was going with Julius, he decided to take Zara with him and told Zara about the plan. However, Zara is Jalbhushan's girlfriend, who informs him of this. But since Zara is going with Jalabuddin, Jalbhushan informs Sasikala about the plan.

They plan an escape, and the women crawl through air vents to destroy DNA evidence. While in the lab—converted into a morgue—they notice Bedi acting suspiciously.

His furtive movements and secretive glances raise alarm, leading them to suspect he may be the murderer. The women secretly record his behavior, convinced that his calm yet tense demeanor conceals a dark secret. This suspicion spreads quickly among the group, placing Bedi under intense scrutiny and making him the prime suspect.

Meanwhile, the men's failed attempt to hide Ranjeet's body results in Bedi's corpse being concealed instead, adding complications to the mystery.

Baba and Bhiddu, two suspended London police officers, receive a call from Baba's ex-wife, coincidentally Maya, to solve the murder. Baba is originally hesitant, but Bhiddu convinces him that solving the murder can help them regain their positions. They then interview all three Jollys individually and separately. After their second attempt, they find clues implicating Dev as the real killer, who insists that he isn't the killer and pleads with Julius to believe him.

At night, Julius investigates the crime scene and finds a missing diamond from the wristband every guest had to wear. He concludes that the killer is the one missing the diamond.

Julius is convinced that the ship captain, Sameer, is the killer as his wristband is missing the diamond. He then tells the two cops about his theory, and they catch the captain and tell him to confess.

However, at that moment, the lights go out, causing chaos as everyone tries to find the light. When the lights turn back on, everyone is shocked to find the two cops holding the dead Captain Sameer, oblivious to the fact they are holding a dead man.

At this moment, their boss Dhagdu Hulgund arrives at the crime scene, and Baba and Bhiddu arrest themselves and go to the ship's jail. Dev is now freed.

As everyone gets ready to leave this madness and return to their normal lives, Dhagdu reveals that no one is going back until they've seen the face of the killer. He then has Julius give all of them sensitive files about their crimes and wrongdoing.

Julius then requests that whoever the killer is among the twelve of them (Julius, Jalabuddin, Jalbhushan, Sasikala, Kaanchi, Zara, Maya, Dev, Shiraz, Batuk, Lucy, Pasta) to kill Dhagdu. A few objections are heard to Julius's proposition, but everyone appears to be in deep thought considering it.

That night, a masked figure enters Dhagdu's room and apparently stabs the sleeping detective. They then go and see the file showing proof of them as the killer, but it turns out to be a mirror exposing (Dev in 5A/Maya in 5B) as the killer. Dhagdu is revealed to be standing in the corner, and while the figure pleads to not being the killer of the previous three and tells the detective Julius is the killer, Julius pops out of the cupboard. He then reveals that Dhagdu told him to provoke everyone. In the flashback, it is revealed that the sensitive file given to Julius was a letter written by Dhagdu stating he knows Julius is a detective and that he is to provoke them, telling that everyone wants him dead but only one will follow through.

Dev/Maya keep insisting they are innocent, which the duo doesn't buy. However, another masked figure arrives to the horror of both and stabs Dev/Maya. Julius goes after the masked figure, and Dhagdu tends to Dev/Maya.

Julius, with the help of the two freed cops, finds out the identity of the second killer: Jalbhushan. In the room, Dev/Maya attempt to kill the detective, but he predicted it and reveals the entire sequence.

Jalbhushan reveals everything: he made a 50/50 deal with Dev/Maya. Dev/Maya were in charge of getting rid of Jalbhushan's DNA sample, but the doctor, arriving from Jalabuddin, accidentally cutting his finger, finds them. He tries to expose them, but they shove peanuts, triggering his allergy reaction, and kill the doctor.

Next, it is revealed that Bedi was suspicious after finding Dev/Maya's pen on the dead body, and when he confronts them, they shoot him and hide his body in the same cupboard where the three Jollys hid Ranjeet's body. It is then revealed the Captain knew about the crime and blackmailed the two of them, so to prevent him from exposing them, Jalbhushan turned off the lights, killed the captain, and framed the two cops.

As chaos engulfs the ship's engine room, the real Jolly, Jalal, finally arrives. A filthy rich entrepreneur in his own right, Jalal declares he doesn't need his father's fortune. In a jaw-dropping twist, he offers to split the £69 billion inheritance among everyone present. The film closes as Julius weds Sasikala, Jalabuddin marries Kaanchi, Dev/Maya and Jalbhushan are arrested, Zara marries Jalal, and Baba and Bhiddu are reinstated as cops by Dhagdu.

== Cast ==
Akshay Kumar and Riteish Deshmukh have starred in all five of the films, as does Chunky Panday in a supporting role.

=== Housefull ===
- Akshay Kumar as Aarush Awasthi
- Riteish Deshmukh as Boman "Bob" Rao
- Deepika Padukone as Saundarya "Sandy" Bhagayalaxmi Venkateshwari Basapa Rao, Arush's ex-half-sister-in-law, then girlfriend; Krishna's sister
- Arjun Rampal as Major Krishna Rao, Sandy's brother; Aarush's ex-half-brother-in-law and then brother-in-law
- Lara Dutta as Hetal Patel Bob's wife & Batook's daughter
- Jiah Khan as Devika Aarush's ex-wife then half-sister-in-law;Kishore's daughter
- Boman Irani as Batook Patel, Hetal's father & Bob's father-in-law
- Chunky Panday as Aakhri Pasta
- Malaika Arora Khan as Pooja
- Randhir Kapoor as Kishore Samtani Devika's father
- Jacqueline Fernandez as Dhanno (Special appearance in song "Aapka Kya Hoga")
- Daisy Irani as Batuk Patel's mother
- Lillete Dubey as Zulekha Bano
- Vindu Dara Singh as security guard
- Suresh Menon as Santa Singh
- Manoj Pahwa as Banta Singh

=== Housefull 2 ===
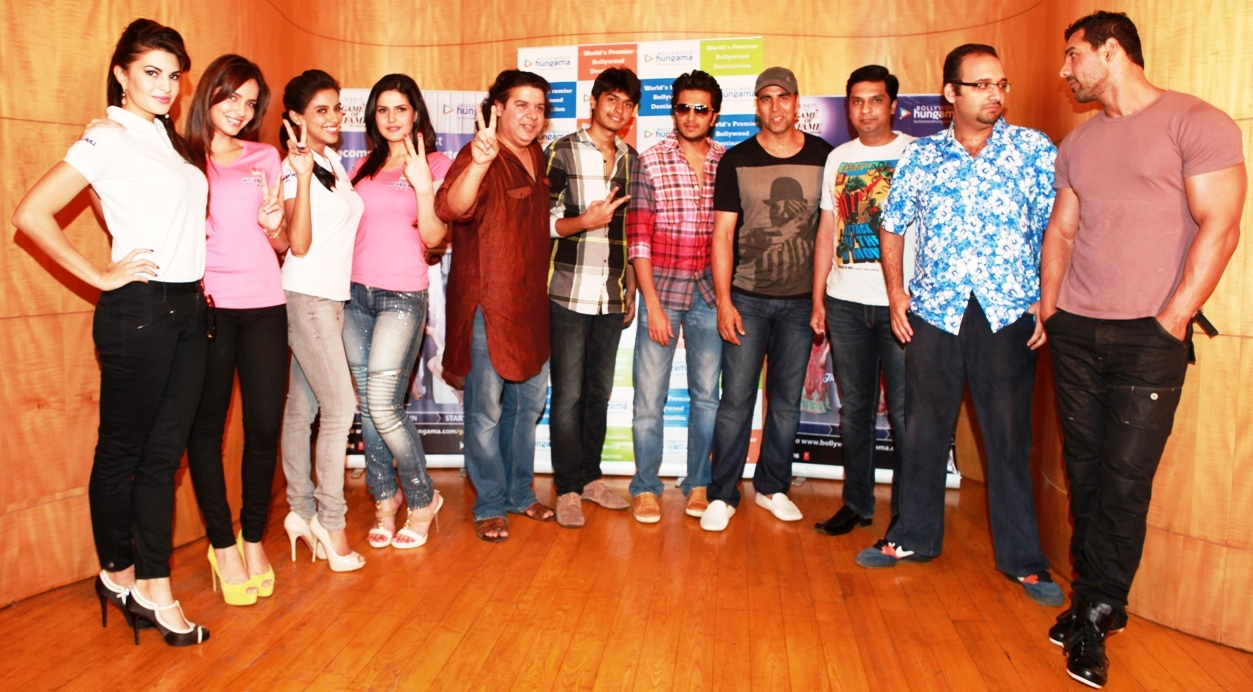
Cast and crew of Housefull 2

- Akshay Kumar as Sunil "Sunny" Pujari
- Asin as Heena Kapoor-Pujari; Chintu and Sweety's daughter, Sunny's wife
- John Abraham as Max Mehrotkar
- Jacqueline Fernandez as Bobby Kapoor-Mehrotkar; Dabboo and Dolly's daughter, Max's wife
- Ritesh Deshmukh as Jwala "Jolly" Kanojia
- Zareen Khan as Jayshree "Jaina/J-Lo" Loganathan-Kanojia; Jolly's wife
- Shreyas Talpade as Jai Babani
- Shazahn Padamsee as Parul Patel-Babani; Batuk's daughter, Jai's wife
- Rishi Kapoor as Chintu Kapoor; Sweety's husband, Heena's father, Sunny's father in-law
- Suparna Marwah as Sweety Kapoor; Chintu's wife, Heena's mother, Sunny's mother in-law
- Randhir Kapoor as Dabboo Kapoor; Dolly's husband, Bobby's father, Max's father in-law
- Neelu Kohli as Dolly Kapoor; Dabboo's wife, Bobby's mother, Max's mother in-law
- Mithun Chakraborty as Jagga "JD" Kanojia (Jagga Daaku); Jolly's father, Jelo's father in-law
- Johnny Lever as Mithai Patil; JD's right-hand
- Boman Irani as Batook Patel; Parul's father, Jai's father in-law
- Virendra Saxena as Mr. Babani; Jai's father, Parul's father in-law
- Ranjeet as Dr. Ranjeet V. Asna K. Pujari; Sunny's father, Heena's father in-law
- Chunky Panday as Aakhri Pasta
- Malaika Arora Khan as Anarkali/Hetal/Sarla (special appearance)

=== Housefull 3 ===
- Akshay Kumar as Sanket "Sandy/Sundi" Sehgal
- Riteish Deshmukh as Tukaram "Teddy" Chaugule
- Abhishek Bachchan as Bunty Malhotra
- Jacqueline Fernandez as Ganga "Gracy" Nagre
- Lisa Haydon as Jamuna "Jenny" Nagre
- Nargis Fakhri as Saraswati "Sara" Nagre
- Boman Irani as Batook Patel
- Jackie Shroff as Urja Nagre
- Chunky Panday as Aakhri Pasta/Aakhri Aastha
- Samir Kochhar as Rishi Patel
- Nikitin Dheer as Rohan Patel
- Arav Chowdharry as Rajeev Patel

=== Housefull 4 ===
- Akshay Kumar as Harry/Rajkumar Bala Dev Singh
- Riteish Deshmukh as Roy/Bangdu Maharaj
- Bobby Deol as Max/Dharamputra
- Kriti Sanon as Kriti/Rajkumari Madhu
- Pooja Hegde as Pooja/Rajkumari Mala
- Kriti Kharbanda as Neha/Rajkumari Meena
- Chunky Panday as Aakhri Pasta/Pehla Pasta
- Rana Daggubati as Pappu Rangeela/Gama
- Ranjeet as Manraj Thakral/Maharaja Surya Singh Rana
- Sharad Kelkar as Michael Bhai/Suryabhan
- Johnny Lever as Winston Churchgate
- Jamie Lever as Giggly
- Nawazuddin Siddiqui as Ramsey Baba
- Manoj Pahwa as Big Bhai
- Parikshit Sahni as Maharaja Parikshitap
- Archana Puran Singh as Harry, Roy, and Max's mother (photo only)
- Shakti Kapoor as Harry, Roy, and Max's father (photo only)
- Sham Mashalkar as Darbari
- Prithvi Zutshi as Siskeria
- Saurabh Srivastava as Lakhan

=== Housefull 5 (A&B) ===
- Akshay Kumar as Julius (Jolly 3)
- Riteish Deshmukh as Jalabuddin (Jolly 1)
- Abhishek Bachchan as Jalbhushan (Jolly 2), partner of the killer (in both version A&B)
- Jacqueline Fernandez as Sasikala, Jalbhushan's fake wife and later Julius wife
- Sonam Bajwa as Zara Akhtar, Jalabuddin's fake wife and later the original Jolly's wife.
- Nargis Fakhri as Kaanchi, Julius' fake wife & Jalabuddin's real wife
- Sanjay Dutt as Chief inspector Bhidu (later Baba)
- Jackie Shroff as Chief inspector Baba (later Bhidu)
- Nana Patekar as Superintendent Dhagdu Hulgund, Bhidu and Baba's senior police officer
- Chitrangda Singh as Maya, Baba's ex-wife, Killer (in version B)
- Fardeen Khan as Dev Dobriyal, Ranjeet Dobriyal's second son, CEO of board of directors, Killer (in version A)
- Chunky Panday as Aakhri Pasta
- Johnny Lever as Batuk Patel
- Shreyas Talpade as Shiraz Shabuddin Siliguriwale, CMO of board of directors
- Dino Morea as Bedi, COO of board of directors
- Soundarya Sharma as Lucy, Baba's girlfriend and Ranjeet Dobriyal's lawyer
- Nikitin Dheer as Captain Sameer
- Ranjeet as Ranjeet Dobriyal
- Akashdeep Sabir as Dr. Aman Joshi
- Archana Puran Singh as Shakuntala Devi (cameo appearance)
- Bobby Deol as Jalal Dobriyal (Real Jolly), son of Ranjeet Dobriyal (cameo appearance)
- Mithun Chakraborty as Jagga Daku (cameo appearance)

== Cast and characters ==
Actor	Film				
Actor	Housefull (2010)	Housefull 2 (2012)	Housefull 3 (2016)	Housefull 4 (2019)	Housefull 5 (A&B) (2025)
Akshay Kumar	Aarush Awasthi	Sunil "Sunny" Pujari	Sanket "Sandy" Sehgal/"Sundy"	Rajkumar Bala Dev Singh/Harish "Harry" Sinha	Julius (Jolly 3)
Riteish Deshmukh	Boman "Bob" Rao	Jwala "Jolly" Kanojia	Tukaram "Teddy" Chaugule	Bangdu Pratap Singh Maharaj/Raman "Roy" Sinha	Jalabuddin (Jolly 1)
Chunky Panday	Aakhri Pasta	Aakhri Pasta	Aakhri Pasta/Aakhri Aastha	Aakhri Pasta/Pehla Pasta	Aakhri Pasta
Boman Irani	Batook Patel	Batook Patel	Batook Patel		
Jacqueline Fernandez	Dhanno	Bobby Kapoor-Mehrotkar	Ganga "Gracy" Nagre		Sasikala
Randhir Kapoor	Kishore Samtani	Dabboo Kapoor			
Malaika Arora	Pooja Rao	Anarkali			
Vindu Dara Singh	Security Guard	Sosa			
Manoj Pahwa	Banta Singh			Big Bhai	
Deepika Padukone	Sandy Rao				
Lara Dutta	Hetal Patel				
Arjun Rampal	Major Krishna Rao				
Jiah Khan	Devika K. Samtani				
John Abraham		Max Mehrotkar			
Asin Thottumkal		Heena Kapoor-Pujari			
Zareen Khan		Jayshree "Jaina/J-Lo" Loganathan-Kanojia			
Shazahn Padamsee		Parul Patel-Babani			
Rishi Kapoor		Chintu Kapoor			
Ranjeet		Dr. Ranjeet K. Pujari		Manraj Thakral / Maharaja Surya Singh Rana	Ranjeet Dobriyal
Johnny Lever		Mithai Patil		Winston Churchgate	Batuk Patel
Shreyas Talpade		Jai Babani			Shiraz
Abhishek Bachchan			Bunty Malhotra		Jalbhusan (Jolly 2)
Jackie Shroff			Urja Nagre		Baba
Nargis Fakhri			Saraswati "Sara" Nagre		Kaanchi
Lisa Haydon			Jamuna "Jenny" Nagre		
Samir Kochhar			Rishi Patel		
Nikitin Dheer			Rohan Patel		Captain Sameer
Arav Chowdharry			Rajeev Patel		
Bobby Deol				Madhav "Max" Sinha/Dharamputra	Jalal Dobriyal (Real Jolly)
Kriti Sanon				Kriti Thakral/Rajkumari Madhu	
Pooja Hegde				Pooja Thakral/Rajkumari Mala	
Kriti Kharbanda				Neha Thakral/Rajkumari Meena	
Sonam Bajwa					Zara Akhtar
Sanjay Dutt					Bhidu
Nana Patekar					Dhagdu Hulgund
Dino Morea					Bedi
Fardeen Khan					Dev Dobriyal
Chitrangada Singh					Maya
Soundarya Sharma					Lucy

== Crew ==
Occupation	Film				
Occupation	Housefull (2010)	Housefull 2 (2012)	Housefull 3 (2016)	Housefull 4 (2019)	Housefull 5 (A&B) (2025)
Director(s)	Sajid Khan	Sajid Khan	Sajid-Farhad	Farhad Samji	Tarun Mansukhani
Producer	Sajid Nadiadwala	Sajid Nadiadwala	Sajid Nadiadwala	Sajid Nadiadwala	Sajid Nadiadwala
Story	Sajid Nadiadwala	Sajid Nadiadwala	K. Subash; Jitendra Parmar	Sara Bodinar	Sajid Nadiadwala
Screenplay	Milap Zaveri; Sajid Khan; Vibha Singh	Sajid Khan; Tushar Hiranandani; Sajid-Farhad	Sajid-Farhad; Rajan Agarwal	Aakash Kaushik; Madhur Sharma; Farhad Samji; Tushar Hiranandani; Sparsh Khetarpal; Tasha Bhambra	Sajid Nadiadwala
Dialogues	Anvita Dutt	Sajid-Farhad	Sajid-Farhad	Farhad Samji	Tasha Bhambra; Sparsh Khetarpal; Tarun Mansukhani; Sajid Nadiadwala; Puja Pandey; Farhad Samji; Shobhit Sinha
Composer(s)	Shankar-Ehsaan-Loy	Sajid-Wajid	Sohail Sen; Mika Singh; Sharib-Toshi; Tanishk Bagchi; Millind Gaba	Sohail Sen; Farhad Samji; Sandeep Shirodkar	Yo Yo Honey Singh; White Noise Collectives; Tanishk Bagchi; Kratex
Background Score	Sandeep Chowta	Sandeep Shirodkar	Julius Packiam	Julius Packiam	Julius Packiam
Director of photography	Vikas Sivaraman	Manoj Soni	Vikas Sivaraman	Sudeep Chatterjee	V. Manikandan
Editor	Rameshwar S. Bhagat	Rameshwar S. Bhagat	Steven Bernard	Rameshwar S. Bhagat	Rameshwar S. Bhagat
Production companies	Nadiadwala Grandson Entertainment	Nadiadwala Grandson Entertainment	Nadiadwala Grandson Entertainment	Nadiadwala Grandson Entertainment	Nadiadwala Grandson Entertainment
Distributor	Eros International	Eros International	Eros International	Fox Star Studios	Pen Marudhar Entertainment

== Reception ==
Box office

Film	Release date	Budget	Box office revenue
Housefull	30 April 2010	₹30 crore (US$6.56 million)	₹124 crore (US$27.12 million)
Housefull 2	6 April 2012	₹60 crore (US$11.23 million)–₹64 crore (US$11.98 million)	₹186 crore (US$34.81 million)
Housefull 3	3 June 2016	₹110 crore (US$16.37 million)	₹195 crore (US$29.02 million)
Housefull 4	25 October 2019	₹150 crore (US$21.3 million)	₹280.27 crore (US$39.8 million)–₹296 crore (US$42.03 million)
Housefull 5	6 June 2025	₹240 crore (US$25 million)	₹242.8 crore (US$25 million)–₹248.8 crore (US$26 million)
Total		₹590 crore (US$61 million)–₹594 crore (US$62 million) (five films)	₹1,028.07 crore (US$110 million)–₹1,049.8 crore (US$110 million) (five films)

Critical reception

Film	Rotten Tomatoes
Housefull	N/A (2 reviews)
Housefull 2	25% (3.9/10 average rating) (8 reviews)
Housefull 3	23% (4/10 average rating) (13 reviews)
Housefull 4	33% (4/10 average rating) (6 reviews)
Housefull 5	13% (3.8/10 average rating) (16 reviews)

== Music ==
The music was composed by Shankar-Ehsaan-Loy in the first film and Sajid-Wajid in the second instalment. In the third film, songs were composed by Sharib-Toshi, Sohail Sen, Mika Singh, Tanishk Bagchi and Millind Gaba. In the fourth instalment, music was composed by Sohail Sen, Farhad Samji and Sandeep Shirodkar. In the fifth instalment, music was composed by Yo Yo Honey Singh, White Noise Collectives, Tanishk Bagchi, Kratex, Shankar–Ehsaan–Loy, Sajid–Wajid and Julius Packiam.

The whole movies soundtrack rights are by T-Series due to Nadiadwala Grandson Entertainment's lifetime contract with Bhushan Kumar.

== Awards and nominations ==
=== Housefull ===
6th Apsara Film & Television Producers Guild Awards

Nominated

- Best Performance in Comic Role – Riteish Deshmukh

2011 Zee Cine Awards

Nominated

- Best Director – Sajid Khan
- Best Actor – Akshay Kumar
- Best Music – Shankar Ehsaan Loy
- Best Supporting Actress – Lara Dutta
- Best Comedian – Riteish Deshmukh
- Zee Cine Award for Best Track of the Year – "Aapka Kya Hoga (Dhanno)"

IIFA Awards

Won

- Best Performance in a Comic Role – Riteish Deshmukh

Stardust Awards

Won

- Star of the Year – Male – Akshay Kumar
- Best Supporting Actor – Arjun Rampal

=== Housefull 2 ===
IIFA Awards

Nominated

- IIFA Award for Best Supporting Actress - Jacqueline Fernandez

=== Housefull 3 ===
Stardust Awards

Nominated

- Best Actress Female - Jacqueline Fernandez

== See also ==
- Welcome (film series)
- Dhamaal (film series)
- Golmaal (film series)
