= Housefull (2010 film) =

2010 Indian film by Sajid Khan

- Theatrical release poster
- Directed by: Sajid Khan
- Screenplay by: Milap Zaveri; Sajid Khan; Vibha Singh
- Dialogues by: Anvita Dutt Guptan
- Story by: Sajid Nadiadwala
- Based on: Kadhala Kadhala by Crazy Mohan
- Produced by: Sajid Nadiadwala
- Starring: Akshay Kumar; Ritesh Deshmukh; Arjun Rampal; Lara Dutta; Deepika Padukone; Jiah Khan
- Cinematography: Vikas Sivaraman
- Edited by: Rameshwar S. Bhagat
- Music by: Songs: Shankar–Ehsaan–Loy; Background Score: Sandeep Chowta
- Production company: Nadiadwala Grandson Entertainment
- Distributed by: Eros International
- Release date: 30 April 2010
- Running time: 155 minutes
- Country: India
- Language: Hindi
- Budget: ₹30 crore
- Box office: est. ₹124.50 crore

Housefull is a 2010 Indian Hindi-language comedy film directed by Sajid Khan and produced by Sajid Nadiadwala. It became the first installment of the Housefull franchise, and was loosely based on the 1998 Tamil film Kaathala Kaathala.

The film stars an ensemble cast of Akshay Kumar, Riteish Deshmukh, Arjun Rampal, Lara Dutta, Deepika Padukone and Jiah Khan, with a supporting cast of Boman Irani, Chunky Pandey, Randhir Kapoor, Lillete Dubey and Malaika Arora. It was shot across London and Italy on a budget of ₹30 crore (US$3.1 million). The film marked the last screen appearance of Khan, who died three years after its release on 3 June 2013.

The film was released worldwide on April 30, 2010, to mixed reviews from critics, emerging as a commercial success. The film grossed over ₹124.50 crore (US$13 million) at worldwide and was declared a super hit. It emerged as the fifth highest-earning Bollywood film of 2010 behind Dabangg, Golmaal 3, Raajneeti and My Name Is Khan according to its net collections of ₹75 crore (US$7.8 million) domestically.

The film went on to spawn three spiritual sequels–Housefull 2, Housefull 3 and Housefull 4–released in 2012, 2016 and 2019 respectively. A fifth film titled Housefull 5 with two prints Housefull 5A and Housefull 5B was released on 6 June 2025.

== Plot ==
Aarush is an extremely unlucky man, often referred to as a "Panauti" (a jinx). He works in a casino in Macau, where he is employed to bring bad luck to winning tables. After being rejected by Pooja, the woman he loves, and getting punched by her elder brother, Major Krishna Rao, Aarush decides to leave Macau and heads to London to stay with his best friend, Bob, and his wife, Hetal.

Initially, Hetal is displeased with Aarush’s presence causing chaos in their home, especially after he accidentally kills her pet parrot Prada with the vacuum cleaner and replaces it with a similarly-named pet sherkhan the tiger in movie the jungle book However, Aarush shows himself to be a kind-hearted man who yearns for a family. Hetal had lied to her father, Batuk Patel, claiming that Bob owns three factories in London and is wealthy. This lie complicates things, as Hetal had married Bob without Batuk’s permission, causing him to be estranged from her. To solve Aarush’s marital woes, Bob and Hetal arrange his marriage to their boss's daughter, Devika Samtani, a woman who appears to have traditional Indian values. After their wedding however, Devika reveals her true self during their honeymoon in Italy—an ultra-modern woman who leaves Aarush for her American boyfriend, Benny.

Heartbroken, Aarush attempts to commit suicide but is saved by Sandy, a Telugu woman. While trying to resuscitate him, Aarush kisses Sandy, who slaps him leading her to believe he is a pervert. When she meets Aakhri Pasta, the quirky owner of a hotel and matchmaker, he tricks Sandy into thinking that Aarush is a widower whose wife died on their honeymoon, so that Sandy befriends him. Feeling sorry for him, Sandy becomes his friend and gradually falls in love with him. However, when Aarush asks Devika for divorce papers in front of Sandy, she discovers that his "dead wife" is alive and leaves him.

Aarush knocks into Sandy's hotel room, but she refuses to let him in. He goes through another hotel room to try to climb to Sandy's room. One of the hotel owners, thinking that Aarush is trying to commit suicide, panics and reports to Pasta, who calls the media to broadcast it on the news. Sandy inadvertently watches the news of Aarush attempting suicide and goes to her balcony and is shocked. Aarush manages to clear up the misunderstandings, telling that Devika is still alive and that she left him on the day of her honeymoon, and Sandy forgives him by saving him. However, for Aarush and Sandy to marry, they need the approval of Sandy’s overprotective brother, Major Krishna Rao. Meanwhile, Hetal continues to deceive her father, Batuk, by claiming that Bob owns a mansion and that they have a child. To impress both Krishna and Batuk, the group rents a mansion from Zulekha. Aarush and Hetal pretend to be married to convince Zulekha to rent them the house.

Things become complicated when Batuk arrives earlier than expected and meets Aarush and Hetal, forcing them to lie that Aarush is Hetal’s husband to maintain the charade, while Bob poses as a cook and Sandy as a maid. To further deceive Batuk, they present a baby from Stella, an African waitress and Hetal's friend, as their child, with Aarush claiming African ancestry. Soon after, Krishna also arrives, adding to the confusion, especially when Aarush recognizes Krishna as Pooja's brother who had punched him earlier. The group tries to convince Krishna that Aarush is wealthy and suitable for Sandy.

Krishna becomes suspicious and uses a lie detector on Aarush at the casino, but Sandy intervenes, and Krishna eventually agrees to their marriage. The story culminates at a Royal Palace event where Krishna is being honored by the Queen of the United Kingdom. During the event, workers accidentally release laughing gas into the hall, causing everyone to break into uncontrollable laughter and inadvertently confess the truth. Despite the chaos, Krishna, impressed by Aarush’s sincerity, gives his blessing for Aarush and Sandy’s marriage. In the end, Aarush’s bad luck seems to have lifted, and he enjoys a happy life with Sandy, while Hetal and Bob reconcile with Batuk Patel.

== Cast ==
- Akshay Kumar as Aarush Awasthi: Bob's best friend, Devika's ex-husband and Sandy's boyfriend
- Riteish Deshmukh as Baburao "Bob" Joglekar: Aarush's best friend, Hetal's husband, Batook's son-in-law
- Arjun Rampal as Major Krishna Rao: Head Of Indian Military Intelligence, Pooja's elder and Sandy's eldest brother
- Deepika Padukone as Soundarya Venkateshwari Bhagyalakshmi Basappa Rao alias "Sandy": Krishna's youngest and Pooja's younger sister, Aarush's girlfriend
- Lara Dutta as Hetal Patel Joglekar: Bob's wife, Batook's daughter, Maithili's granddaughter
- Jiah Khan as Devika K. Samtani: Aarush's ex-wife, Kishore's daughter, Sorman's girlfriend
- Boman Irani as Batook Patel: Hetal's father, Bob's father-in-law, Maithili's son, Aarush’s fake father
- Lillete Dubey as Zulekha Banu: Aarush’s fake mother
- Randhir Kapoor as Kishore Samtani: Devika's father, Bob's billionare boss and Aarush's former father-in-law
- Malaika Arora as Pooja Rao: Krishna's younger and Sandy's older sister, Aarush's ex-girlfriend
- Chunky Panday as Aakhri Pasta
- Manoj Pahwa as Santa Singh
- Suresh Menon as Banta
- Daisy Irani as Maithili Patel: Batook's mother, Hetal's grandmother, Bob's grandmother-in-law
- Jacqueline Fernandez as Dhanno, a bar dancer in a special appearance in the song "Aapka Kya Hoga"
- Rajesh Kava as the voice of Prada, a talking parrot
- Stove Singh as the black baby (Stella's son) Rahul Rajesh Rohan Raj
- Anvita Dutt Guptan as a broker who introduces Aarush to the landlady
- Vindu Dara Singh as Security Guard Chaudhary

== Soundtrack ==
The film's soundtrack is composed by Shankar–Ehsaan–Loy. The lyrics are written by Sameer and Amitabh Bhattacharya. The song "Aapka Kya Hoga" was a remake of the song "Apni Toh Jaise Taise" from the 1981 film Lawaaris.

Housefull

Soundtrack album by Shankar–Ehsaan–Loy
- Released: 16 March 2010
- Genre: Film soundtrack
- Length: 30:32
- Label: T-Series
- Producer: Shankar–Ehsaan–Loy

Shankar–Ehsaan–Loy chronology
Hum Tum Aur Ghost (2010)	Housefull (2010)	Tere Bin Laden (2010)

=== Track list ===
No.	Title	Singer(s)	Length
1.	"Oh Girl You're Mine"	Tarun Sagar & Shilpa Rao	3:56
2.	"Papa Jaag Jaayega"	Neeraj Shridhar, Ritu Pathak & Alyssa Mendonsa	3:17
3.	"I Don't Know What To Do"	Shabbir Kumar & Sunidhi Chauhan	3:20
4.	"Aapka Kya Hoga (Dhanno)"	Mika Singh, Sunidhi Chauhan & Sajid Khan	5:08
5.	"Loser"	Amitabh Bhattacharya & Vivienne Pocha	3:17
6.	"Oh Girl You're Mine" (O Boy What A Girl Mix)	Tarun Sagar, Alyssa Mendosa & Loy Mendonsa	3:39
7.	"Papa Jaag Jaayega" (Insane Insomaniac Mix)	Neeraj Shridhar, Ritu Pathak & Alyssa Mendonsa	3:44
8.	"I Don't Know What To Do" (Shabbir's Sexy 70's Mix)	Shabbir Kumar & Sunidhi Chauhan	4:03

=== Reception ===
The soundtrack was met with positive reviews.

Joginder Tuteja of Bollywood Hungama gave the album 3.5 stars and stated "Housefull is a fun album and never takes itself too seriously to turn into a landmark affair that would be remembered for years to come. The songs are meant to be entertaining enough to fit in well with the film's narrative and not allow any full moment whatsoever to come in." Rudhir Barman of Sampurn Wire awarded the album 3.5 out of a possible 5 stars saying "The fast paced journey that everything is taking currently, it's the survival of what works 'today'. In that aspect, 'Housefull' works and ensures that there won't be any dull moment once the songs play on screen."

== Reception ==
=== Critical response ===
Anupama Chopra of NDTV said that it was impossible to take the characters seriously, and gave the movie a rating of 2/5. Rediff gave it a 1/5, calling its humour 'lame'. Rajeev Masand of CNN-IBN said 'Housefull' makes you cringe in embarrassment and disgust for what passes off as 'entertainment' and 'cinema' these days. Noyon Jyoti Parasara of AOL India gave it a 2 and said, "What annoys most about 'Housefull' is the fact that Sajid Khan claims this to be his tribute to greats like Manmohan Desai and Hrishikesh Mukherjee. Both have been great filmmakers and had their respective domains and Sajid's attempt at combining both ends up has him falling flat on his face." Gaurav Malani from IndiaTimes gave it 2/5 and said "Housefull is a slap on your senses as the film sticks to the slapstick genre in every literal sense.[...] There are some genuinely funny moments in the second half esp. Boman Irani sleepwalking through his portrayal of Gujarati Sholay. Unfortunately, it fails to salvage the harm caused by the bland, boring and banal first half. Housefull ends up being a painful experience." Raja Sen of Rediff.com gave a 1.5 out of 5 star rating explaining that "You may wonder if this film's a ripoff of any particular Hollywood DVD, but Sajid would probably say its his homage to Ben Stiller's worst films, picking plot points from Along Came Polly, The Heartbreak Kid and Meet The Parents."

In a rare positive review, Taran Adarsh of Bollywood Hungama gave the film a rating of 4/5, saying "Housefull is a complete laugh-riot, and is an entertainer all the way, targeted at the masses".

=== Box office ===
Upon release, the film had a good opening weekend of Rs. 410 million in India. This gave Akshay Kumar his biggest opening till date, beating Singh Is Kinng. Housefull's opening weekend was the second-highest opening weekend collection of all time, behind 3 Idiots. By the end of the first week, the film had collected Rs 498 million, the third-highest first week collection – behind 3 Idiots and Ghajini. It also broke the 2010 record of biggest first week, previously held by My Name Is Khan. Housefull debuted in the United Kingdom at number two and collected Rs 18 million on 55 screens in its opening weekend, while in the United States, the film collected Rs. 28 million on 82 screens in its opening weekend. After six weeks, the film netted Rs. 1.81 billion. The film was declared a hit by Box Office India. Housefull 2010 total box office grossing crossed 1 billion mark.

== Awards and nominations ==
6th Apsara Film & Television Producers Guild Awards

- Nominated – Best Comedian – Riteish Deshmukh

2011 Zee Cine Awards

Nominated

- Best Director – Sajid Khan
- Best Actor – Akshay Kumar
- Best Supporting Actress – Lara Dutta
- Best Comedian – Riteish Deshmukh
- Best Music Director – Shankar Ehsaan Loy
- Best Track of the Year – "Aapka Kya Hoga (Dhanno)"

IIFA Awards

Won

- Best Performance in a Comic Role – Riteish Deshmukh

Stardust Awards

Won

- Star of the Year – Male – Akshay Kumar
- Best Supporting Actor – Arjun Rampal

3rd Mirchi Music Awards

Nominated

- Best Item Song of the Year – "Aapka Kya Hoga (Dhanno)"
- Best Song Recording – Abhay Rumde, Sameer Khan and Ashish Saksena – "Oh Girl You're Mine"

== Controversies ==
P L Thenappan, the producer of the 1998 Tamil film, Kaathala Kaathala, filed a complaint with the Tamil Film Producers Council, alleging that producer Sajid Nadiadwala and director Sajid Khan had remade his film into Hindi without proper permission. In his complaint, Thenappan said, "I was shocked when I watched the Hindi film as nearly 60 per cent of the scenes from Kadhala Kadhala are there." He also stated that he was in talks with Nadiadwala about selling the remake rights more than a year ago and the deal did not go through.

The film also faced problems due to the remixed version of the song "Apni Toh Jaise Taise", originally from the 1981 film Laawaris directed by Prakash Mehra, music by Kalyanji Anandji. The Calcutta High Court restrained producer Sajid Nadiadwala from the cinematic use of the song.

== Home media ==
Housefull was released in Blu-ray and DVD in October 2010. The satellite rights of the movie were sold to Star Network. The television premiere of the movie was occurred on 29 August 2010 on Star Plus. The film has been made streaming available on Eros Now, JioCinema, Zee5 and Amazon Prime Video since 2020.

== Sequel ==
See article: Housefull 2, Housefull 3, Housefull 4, and Housefull 5 (A&B)

Producer Sajid Nadiadwala announced a sequel to the film on 30 September 2010. In September 2011, it was reported by director Sajid Khan that the film had begun filming. It features Akshay Kumar, Ritesh Deshmukh, Jacqueline Fernandez, Randhir Kapoor, Boman Irani and Chunkey Pandey from the previous film in new characters, whilst new additions include Asin Thottumkal, John Abraham, Zarine Khan, Shreyas Talpade and Shazahn Padamsee. It also stars veteran actors such as Rishi Kapoor, Mithun Chakraborty and Johnny Lever in supporting roles. Housefull 2 was released on 6 April 2012 and received a mixed response from critics. The sequel was more successful than the prequel and was declared a super hit at the box office.

Another sequel directed by Sajid-Farhad featuring Akshay Kumar, Ritesh Deshmukh and Jacqueline Fernandez from the previous instalments in pivotal roles alongside Abhishek Bachchan, Lisa Haydon and Nargis Fakhri (the newest additions) was released on 3 June 2016.
