= Housefull 2 =

2012 Indian film by Sajid Khan

Housefull 2: The Dirty Dozen
- Theatrical release poster
- Directed by: Sajid Khan
- Screenplay by: Sajid Khan; Tushar Hiranandani; Sajid-Farhad; Sajid Nadiadwala
- Dialogues by: Sajid-Farhad
- Story by: Sajid Nadiadwala
- Based on: Mattupetti Machan; by Jose
- Produced by: Sajid Nadiadwala
- Starring: Rishi Kapoor; Randhir Kapoor; Mithun Chakraborty; Akshay Kumar; John Abraham; Riteish Deshmukh; Shreyas Talpade; Asin; Jacqueline Fernandez; Shazahn Padamsee; Zareen Khan; Boman Irani
- Cinematography: Manoj Soni
- Edited by: Rameshwar S. Bhagat
- Music by: Songs: Sajid–Wajid; Background Score: Sandeep Shirodkar
- Production company: Nadiadwala Grandson Entertainment
- Distributed by: Eros International
- Release date: 5 April 2012
- Running time: 155 minutes
- Country: India
- Language: Hindi
- Budget: ₹60–64 crore (Note: Budget does not include marketing or promotional costs.)
- Box office: est. ₹186 crore

Housefull 2, sometimes called Housefull 2: The Dirty Dozen, is a 2012 Indian Hindi-language action comedy film written and directed by Sajid Khan. It was co-written by brothers Sajid Samji and Farhad Samji based on a story by Sajid Nadiadwala. Produced by Nadiadwala under Nadiadwala Grandson Entertainment and distributed by Eros International, it is a remake of Mattupetty Machan and the second installment of the Housefull franchise, is a standalone sequel to Housefull (2010).

Housefull 2 features an ensemble cast consisting of Rishi Kapoor, Randhir Kapoor, Mithun Chakraborty, Akshay Kumar, Asin, John Abraham, Jacqueline Fernandez, Riteish Deshmukh, Shreyas Talpade, Zareen Khan, Chunky Panday, Shazahn Padamsee and Boman Irani. Housefull 2 was released theatrically on 5 April 2012, to mixed reviews. Made on a budget of ₹60–64 crore, the film accumulated ₹186 crore (US$19 million) worldwide, becoming one of the highest-grossing Hindi films of 2012. It was followed by two sequels: Housefull 3 and Housefull 4 which were released in 2016 and 2019 respectively. A fifth film titled Housefull 5 with two prints Housefull 5A and Housefull 5B was released on 6 June 2025. The film had mixed-to-positive reviews from critics, with praise for its performances, humor, liveliness and dialogues, and is counted as the best film in the Housefull franchise. The film became a "Blockbuster" at the box office.

== Plot ==
Sunny, Max, Jolly and Jai are best friends who study together in a college. One day in the college farewell, Max's girlfriend Sonia gets attracted to Sunny and tries to be intimate with him. When Max catches them, Sonia lies to him that Sunny harassed her, causing Max and Sunny to get into a physical fight, and both turn sworn enemies and part ways.

10 years later, animal activists Heena and Bobby are the daughters of two opposing Kapoor families who despise each other very much, just like their fathers Chintu and Dabboo who are half-brothers. They both want the richest son-in-law for their daughters and thus hire marriage counsellor Aakhri Pasta to find the best son-in-law. He brings Rajendra Babani to Chintu for discussing Jai, who is his son. Chintu misinterprets one of Aakhri's jokes who says Jai looks neither like his parents and may be illegitimate. His parents didn't hear Aakhri's comments; Chintu verbally abuses Rajendra while shouting. Rajendra suffers a heart attack, landing him in a hospital. Jai vows revenge and, with Pasta, asks Jolly (being the son of a billionaire "JD") to go to Chintu, agree to marry Heena and then break off the wedding at the very end. However, Jolly is busy trying to introduce his girlfriend Jelo to JD and doesn't want to get involved. He suggests Max to pose as Jolly, who agrees. Jai and Max go but mistakenly end up in Dabboo's house when Dabboo steal's Chintu's "real" nameplate, and later realize their mistake. Jolly then convinces Sunny to land in Chintu's house, and there becomes his bodyguard.

Later, Chintu and Dabboo send Sunny and Max respectively with Heena and Bobby on a cruise for an animal safety event. There, Sunny and Max attempt to chloroform Bobby and Heena respectively and put them on a lifeboat so their respective girlfriends can win their awards, but spot each other and chloroform themselves, causing all of them to end up on an island. In the process, Max and Sunny become friends again, and Heena and Bobby also sort out their relations. They find a resort where Jai and Jolly are at and go home. Max gets engaged to Bobby and Sunny to Heena. Jai also falls in love with Parul Patel. Chintu blindfolds Jolly, Sunny and Heena, taking them to JD's house. After seeing Jolly holding Sunny's garland, JD assumes that Jolly got engaged to Heena. Luckily, Sunny convinces him. Jolly later reveals to Max, Sunny, and Jai that his real name is Jwala, and JD was actually a dacoit, Jagga Dacoit, almost 20 years ago. He also exposes that Parul is JD's friend Batuk Patel's daughter with whom JD had fixed his marriage 20 years ago.

As Sunny fools Chintu, he calls Dabboo in excitement and tells him that Heena is marrying JD's son Jolly (in actuality Sunny). Confused as believing Max to be Jolly, Dabboo takes Max and Bobby to JD's mansion. Sunny handles the situation well by fooling J.D consistently by taking the name of Goddess Bhadrakali as J.D. is her true devotee, stating Max is Jolly's friend who is engaged to Bobby and Max's father is against their marriage. JD then welcomes all of them and tells to stay there till Bobby and Max's marriage. Batuk also finally arrives there with Parul. Jai and Jolly come to receive them from the airport. But when they see Parul, Jai and Jolly/Jwala lie that Jai is Jolly. Parul becomes happy hearing this as they love each other. J-Lo gives Jolly/Jwala the ultimatum to take her to his house or forget her. To help Jolly/Jwala, Sunny lies to J.D., saying that J-Lo is his fiancée, and J.D. again agrees to let her live there as Sunny takes the name of Goddess Bhadrakali. Sunny and Max lie to their respective fathers-in-law that the other guy is the son of J.D. and a maid servant in the mansion, creating much confusion.

When Sunny's father, Dr. Ranjeet as well as Max's mentor tells them never to break anyone's heart, Sunny and Max tell the truth to Heena and Bobby relationship. Enraged, Bobby and Heena rebuke them, but thinking Sunny and Max could have done more wrong with them, the two sisters forgive the two boys on the very next day. There, Jai and Jolly also let off their revenge plan on Kapoors on Jai's father's advice. On the day of the four couples' marriage, J.D. and the other brides' fathers learn the truth about the grooms. Finally, Bobby and Heena convince their fathers to forget their enmity and live together as legitimate brothers.

Chintu and Dabboo join hands and so do their wives. But J.D. is unconvinced by them telling the truth and starts frightening the families with his gun. He tries to shoot Sunny with his gun as Sunny runs towards J.D. to save him from a falling chandelier and then he understands everything. In the end, all the grooms marry their respective girlfriends.

== Cast ==
- Rishi Kapoor as Chintu Kapoor; Dabboo's younger brother, Sweety's husband, Heena's father, Sunny's father-in-law
- Randhir Kapoor as Dabboo Kapoor; Chintu's elder brother, Dolly's husband, Bobby's father, Max's father-in-law
- Mithun Chakraborty as Jagga "JD" Kanojia (Jagga Daaku); a feared ex-dacoit, Jwala's father, Jaina's father-in-law/bandit/jagga dacoit
- Akshay Kumar as Sunil "Sunny" Pujari; Heena's love interest and later husband, Ranjeet's son, Max, Jwala and Jai's best friend, Chintu and Sweety's son-in-law
- John Abraham as Max Mehrotkar; Bobby's love interest and later husband, Sunny, Jwala and Jai's best friend, Dabboo and Dolly's son-in-law
- Riteish Deshmukh as Jwala "Jolly" Kanojia; Jaina's love interest and later husband, JD's son, Sunny, Max and Jai's best friend
- Shreyas Talpade as Jai Babani; Parul's love interest and later husband, Rajendra's son, Sunny, Max and Jwala's best friend, Batuk's son-in-law
- Asin as Heena Kapoor-Pujari; Sunny's love interest and later wife, Chintu and Sweety's daughter, Bobby's cousin sister
- Jacqueline Fernandez as Bobby Kapoor-Mehrotkar; Max's love interest and later wife, Dabboo and Dolly's daughter, Heena's cousin sister
- Zareen Khan as Jayshree "Jaina/J-Lo" Loganathan-Kanojia; Jwala's love interest and later wife, JD's daughter-in-law
- Shazahn Padamsee as Parul Patel-Babani; Jai's love interest and later wife, Batuk's daughter, Rajendra's daughter-in-law
- Boman Irani as Batuk Patel; an ex-police commissioner, JD's best friend, Parul's father, Jai's father-in-law
- Chunky Panday as Aakhri Pasta; marriage counsellor
- Malaika Arora as Anarkali; Sarla for JD and Hetal for Batuk Patel
- Suparna Marwah as Sweety Kapoor; Chintu's wife, Heena's mother, Sunny's mother-in-law
- Johnny Lever as Mithai Vishwasrao Patil; JD's loyal servant
- Veerendra Saxena as Mr. Rajendra Omprakash Babani; Jai's father, Parul's father-in-law
- Neelu Kohli as Dolly Kapoor; Dabboo's wife, Bobby's mother, Max's mother-in-law
- Ranjeet as Dr. Ranjeet V. Asna K. Pujari; Sunny's father, Max's mentor and father figure, Heena's father-in-law
- Ushoshi Sengupta as Sonia Luthra; Max's ex-girlfriend
- Vindu Dara Singh as Sosa D'Costa; Jaina's boss

== Production ==
The sequel to Housefull was confirmed by Sajid Nadiadwala on 30 September 2010. Filming began on 9 June 2011 in London and Peterborough. The second schedule started from 1 October 2011 in Filmistan Studio, Mumbai and the last schedule was shot in December in Thailand, with one of the locations being the Sheraton Krabi Beach Resort. Sajid Nadiadwala hired a Hollywood action-set for Akshay Kumar's character. Asin replaced Deepika Padukone who was the female lead in the prequel as the lead actress.

== Soundtrack ==
The full album released on 22 February 2012. It met with positive reviews with people calling it evergreen and lively. The making of the song "Papa Toh Band Bajaye" was leaked to YouTube in early January 2012. Singer Abhijeet Bhattacharya filed a lawsuit against the film's producers, saying that the melody for "Do U Know" had been copied from his 2005 song "Baje Jo Bansi". The lyrics were penned by Sameer and Amitabh Bhattacharya (Do You Know), with the songs were composed by Sajid–Wajid.

The film score was composed by Sandeep Shirodkar.

Housefull 2

Soundtrack album by Sajid–Wajid
- Released: 22 February 2012
- Genre: Film soundtrack
- Length: 37:00
- Label: T-Series
- Producer: Sajid–Wajid

Sajid–Wajid chronology
Miley Naa Miley Hum (2011)	Housefull 2 (2012)	Tezz (2012)

All music is composed by Sajid–Wajid.

Housefull 2 track listing
No.	Title	Singer(s)	Length
1.	"Papa Toh Band Bajaye"	Neeraj Shridhar	04:13
2.	"Anarkali Disco Chali"	Mamta Sharma, Sukhwinder Singh	04:53
3.	"Right Now Now"	Wajid Khan, Sunidhi Chauhan, Sonu Nigam, Suzanne D'Mello	04:06
4.	"Do U Know"	Shaan, Shreya Ghoshal	05:22
5.	"Anarkali Disco Chali" (Hyper Mix)	Mamta Sharma, Sukhwinder Singh	04:42
6.	"Right Now Now" (Remix)	Wajid Khan, Sunidhi Chauhan, Sonu Nigam, Suzanne D'Mello	04:28
7.	"Do U Know" (Remix)	Shaan, Shreya Ghoshal	05:16
8.	"Anarkali Disco Chali" (Remix)	Mamta Sharma, Sukhwinder Singh	04:01

== Release ==
Though the film was initially expected to release on 1 June 2012, it was announced on 30 September 2011 that the film would be releasing on 6 April 2012. The film had an earlier release in the UK on 31 March 2012 due to the Easter holidays. Housefull 2 got a 2700-screen release, the fourth largest release in the history of Indian cinema, behind Ra.One, Bodyguard and Don 2 and India's biggest release of 2012. Housefull 2 was screened in 1,027 UFO digital theatres on the first day when it released.

=== Critical reception ===
Though Housefull 2's response was more positive than its predecessor, it still received mixed reviews by critics. On the review aggregator website Rotten Tomatoes, 25% of 8 critics' reviews are positive, with an average rating of 3.9/10.

The Times of India gave the movie 3.5 out of 5 stars, praising the performance of Akshay Kumar and Asin. Taran Adarsh from Bollywood Hungama gave 3.5 stars and said, "If you are a movie-goer who derives happiness from loud comedies with over-the-top humor that defy logic at every opportunity, I am sure, you will relish this wacky slapstick. If your idea of watching a comedy is to have a good time at the movies, then Housefull 2 is especially designed for you." Kanika Sikka of DNA rated 2 out of 5 stars and wrote, "Go in with a promise that you'll be entertained, but don't expect an exhilarating journey." Sonia Chopra of Sify rated 2 out of 5 stars stating, "The physical slapstick comedy is straight out of a kids' movie, but it is charmingly daft. You cannot help let out a laugh or two. It's accidentally comic when you have a person with a bullet in his arm, but no one thinks of ringing for the ambulance. You see, long-winded, sappy moral science lectures are to be given at the very time." Anupama Chopra of Hindustan Times gave the film 2 out of 5 stars and said, "Housefull 2 has exactly the same mix of stars, foreign locations, farcical plot and spectacularly dim-witted comedy as the first Housefull. This is the cinematic equivalent of junk food - when you walk in, you know exactly what you're going to get." Raja Sen of Rediff gave the film 1 out of 5 stars and commented, "Housefull 2 is shamefully bad. So bad that Ranjeet—the rapey villain of yore—who appears in one scene, is the most dignified thing about the film." Rajeev Masand from CNN-IBN gave the film 1 out 5 stars and said, "Housefull 2 is for four-year-olds who don't know any better. For anyone with taste, or anyone seeking genuine laughs, there's nothing here."

=== Pre-release revenue ===
The satellite rights of the film were sold in January 2011 for ₹270 million (US$2.8 million). The music rights fetched an additional ₹55 million (US$570,000).

== Box office ==
=== India ===
Housefull 2 had a good first day as it collected ₹133 million (US$1.4 million) nett. The movie further collected ₹128 million (US$1.3 million) nett in its second day and ₹160 million (US$1.7 million) nett in its third day, taking its weekend collection to ₹420 million (US$4.4 million). The movie collected ₹65.0 million (US$670,000) nett in its fourth day and ₹55.0 million (US$570,000) nett in its fifth day. The film collected ₹630 million (US$6.5 million) nett i its first week. Housefull 2 lost around ₹40 million (US$420,000) nett over the weekend due to the IPL matches and regional films. Housefull 2 had a big second weekend as it collected around ₹195 million (US$2.0 million) nett. Housefull 2 did extremely well in its second week with business around ₹300 million (US$3.1 million). The two-week business of the film is around ₹925 million (US$9.6 million) nett. It further collected ₹125 million (US$1.3 million) in its third week and crossed the ₹1 billion (US$10 million) mark. It was labelled as a "super hit" by Boxofficeindia. The film's all-India distributor share was ₹580 million (US$6.0 million). Housefull 2 grossed ₹1,140 million (US$12 million) in India. It was the fourth most successful film of the year. Asin's third most successful film. The film grossed around ₹179.15 crore (US$19 million), becoming one of the highest-grossing Hindi films of that year.

=== Overseas ===
Housefull 2 grossed ₹140 million (US$1.5 million) in 3 days in overseas and overall ₹180 million (US$1.9 million) in 8 days. It collected ₹55.0 million (US$570,000) overseas on Thursday and Friday. In UK, it collected £112,075 on Friday. In Australia, Housefull 2 collected A$73,143 on Friday. In New Zealand, the Friday collections were NZ$34,604. In the UAE, collections on Thursday were AED725,000. In North America, it was the second Hindi film to enter the top 10 after Kites, with $847,132, ranking at No. 9 behind The Hunger Games, American Reunion, Titanic 3D, Wrath of the Titans, Mirror Mirror, 21 Jump Street, The Lorax, and Salmon Fishing in the Yemen with a solid $7,001 average in 121 theatres. Housefull 2 grossed around $5.75 million in 17 days, becoming Akshay Kumar's second biggest grosser overseas after Singh Is Kinng. It became the highest grossing Hindi film in New Zealand, grossing NZ$260,000 in three weeks, thus surpassing 3 Idiots and My Name is Khan.
