= Housefull 4 =

2019 Indian film by Farhad Samji

- Theatrical release poster
- Directed by: Farhad Samji
- Screenplay by: Aakash Kaushik; Madhur Sharma; Farhad Samji; Tushar Hiranandani; Sparsh Khetarpal; Tasha Bhambra
- Story by: Sara Bodinar; Sajid Nadiadwala
- Produced by: Sajid Nadiadwala
- Starring: Akshay Kumar; Riteish Deshmukh; Bobby Deol; Kriti Sanon; Pooja Hegde; Kriti Kharbanda
- Cinematography: Sudeep Chatterjee
- Edited by: Rameshwar S. Bhagat
- Music by: Songs: Sohail Sen; Farhad Samji; Sandeep Shirodkar; Score: Julius Packiam
- Production companies: Fox Star Studios; Nadiadwala Grandson Entertainment
- Distributed by: Fox Star Studios
- Release date: 25 October 2019 (India)
- Running time: 145 minutes
- Country: India
- Language: Hindi
- Budget: ₹150 crore
- Box office: est. ₹280.27–296 crore

Housefull 4 is a 2019 Indian Hindi-language fantasy action comedy film directed by Farhad Samji and produced by Nadiadwala Grandson Entertainment and Fox Star Studios. The film is the fourth instalment of the Housefull series, and stars an ensemble cast of Akshay Kumar, Riteish Deshmukh, Bobby Deol, Kriti Sanon, Pooja Hegde and Kriti Kharbanda in the lead roles. The plot deals with reincarnation. Three brothers are set to marry three sisters. However, a peek into the distant past reveals to one of the brothers that their brides have been mixed up in their current reincarnation.

The film was half directed by Sajid Khan, who had also directed the first two instalments, but was replaced by Farhad Samji midway during the shooting due to Me Too allegations. Nadiadwala claimed the film to be the highest-budgeted Indian comedy film.

The film was theatrically released in India on 25 October 2019 during the occasion of Diwali and like the previous film, it received mixed-to-negative reviews. The film became a major commercial success by grossing nearly ₹300 crore worldwide, and went on to become the 7th highest-grossing Hindi film of 2019.

A sequel, titled Housefull 5 with two prints, Housefull 5A and Housefull 5B was released on 6 June 2025.

== Plot ==
Housefull 4 is a comedy film centered on reincarnation, spanning 600 years from 1419 to 2019.

In 2019, three brothers—Harry, a barber who temporarily forgets what he's currently doing when he hears a loud sound; Roy; and Max—live in London. Harry experiences visions of a past life and misplaces a bag containing £5 million belonging to gangsters Michael and Big Bhai, in the laundry machine, who demand its return. To settle the debt, the brothers plan to marry the wealthy Thakral sisters: Pooja, Neha, and Kriti. However, they fall in love with the wrong sisters, leading to chaotic wedding preparations in Sitamgarh.

In Sitamgarh, hotel bellboy Aakhri Pasta recognises the group as reincarnations from 1419 Madhavgarh and Sitamgarh. Through Harry’s visions and Pasta’s revelations, they learn of their past lives. In 1419, Prince Bala of Madhavgarh, exiled for plotting against his father, sought to marry Princess Madhu, eldest daughter of Sitamgarh’s King Surya Singh Rana, to gain the throne. Bala’s allies—dance teacher Bangdu and bodyguard Dharamputra—loved Madhu’s sisters, Mala and Meena, respectively. Desperate to be king of Sitamgarh, Suryabhan, the king’s nephew, framed the couples for murdering an enemy clan leader, leading to a battle with the leader’s brother, Gama. During the chaos, Suryabhan sabotaged their wedding mandap, killing the couples.

In the present, Harry, Roy, and Max realise they are set to marry the wrong sisters (Harry with Pooja, Roy with Neha, Max with Kriti) compared to their past lives (Bala-Madhu, Bangdu-Mala, Dharamputra-Meena). Pasta helps them recall their past, and a painting of their 1419 wedding triggers the sisters’ memories. Pappu Rangeela, Gama’s reincarnation, and Michael, Suryabhan’s reincarnation, disrupt the wedding. Kriti reveals Suryabhan’s past betrayal, and Pappu kills Michael by pushing him into a collapsing mandap, avenging his brother’s death. The film concludes with the correct couples—Harry-Kriti, Roy-Pooja, and Max-Neha—marrying, fulfilling their 600-year love story.

== Cast ==
- Akshay Kumar as
  - Rajkumar Bala Dev Singh
  - Harsh "Harry" Sinha, Bala's reincarnation
- Bobby Deol as
  - Mahabali Dharamputra Deo Singh
  - Madhav "Max" Sinha, Dharamputra's reincarnation
- Riteish Deshmukh as
  - Bangdu Pratap Singh Maharaj
  - Raman "Roy" Sinha, Bangdu's reincarnation
- Kriti Sanon as
  - Rajkumari Madhu
  - Kriti Thakral, Madhu's reincarnation
- Pooja Hegde as
  - Rajkumari Maala
  - Pooja Thakral, Maala's reincarnation
- Kriti Kharbanda as
  - Rajkumari Meena
  - Neha Thakral, Meena's reincarnation
- Rana Daggubati as
  - Maharaja Gama Chandrendar
  - Ashish "Pappu" Rangeela, Gama's reincarnation (voice dubbed by Manoj Pandey)
- Chunky Panday as
  - Pehla Pasta
  - Aakhri Pasta, Pehla Pasta's reincarnation
- Ranjeet as
  - Maharaja Surya Singh Rana
  - Manraj Thakral, Raja Surya's reincarnation
- Sharad Kelkar as
  - Suryabhan
  - Gangster Michael D'Costa/ Michael Bhai, Suryabhan's reincarnation
- Johnny Lever as Winston Churchgate, Hotel Manager of Sitamgarh and reincarnated Giggly (Dual role)
- Jamie Lever as Giggly; Madhu, Mala, and Meena's maid, Pehla Pasta's wife
- Nawazuddin Siddiqui as Dharmesh Ramsey a.k.a. Ramsey Baba (special appearance), a tantrik
- Manoj Pahwa as Viraj Sehni a.k.a. Big Bhai, Ganglead of Michael Bhai (special appearance)
- Parikshit Sahni as Maharaja Parikshitap Dev Singh (special appearance)
- Archana Puran Singh as Varsha P. Sinha (photo only), Mother of Harry, Max and Roy
- Shakti Kapoor as Prabhakar Badrinath Sinha (photo only), Father of Harry, Max and Roy
- Sham Mashalkar as Darbari
- Prithvi Zutshi as Shekhar Siskeria
- Saurabh Sachdeva as Raazdaar
- Saurabh Srivastava as Lakhan
- Dipesh K. Shrestha as a Driver

== Production ==
=== Development ===
After the success of Housefull (2010), Housefull 2 (2012), and Housefull 3 (2016), Sajid Nadiadwala announced Housefull 4 on 27 October 2017. The film was the fourth film in Housefull film series.

Sajid Khan was announced as the director. Farhad Samji, who directed Housefull 3 came on board to write the screenplay and dialogues, from the story by Sajid Nadiadwala.

The film was made on a budget of ₹75 crore. In February 2018, it was reported that the film would commence filming in June 2018, in order to give time to post-production and VFX works. DNEG was reported to be do the VFX works of the film, the team shifted from London to Mumbai till the release for the same. The theatrical distribution, overseas, satellite and digital rights of the film were acquired by Fox Star Studios for ₹200 crore.

The technicians include cinematographer Sudeep Chatterjee, editor Rameshwar S. Bhagat, production designers Amit Ray and Subrata Chakraborty, stunt director Sham Kaushal, art directors Rupam Paul, Pallavi Pethkar, and Vinayak Joshi, costume designers Rimple, and Harpreet Narula and choreographers Farah Khan, Ganesh Acharya and Chinni Prakash.

=== Casting ===
Mukesh Chhabra served as the casting director. Akshay Kumar and Riteish Deshmukh, who were part of previous films in the series were part of the film. Bobby Deol joined the cast in March 2018. The film marks his fifth collaboration with Kumar after Ajnabee (2001), Ab Tumhare Hawale Watan Sathiyo (2004), Dosti: Friends Forever (2005), and Thank You (2011).

While Kriti Sanon and Pooja Hegde joined the casts and lead actresses in March 2018, Kriti Kharbanda joined in June 2018. Sharad Kelkar joined the cast in August 2018. Rana Daggubati joined the cast in November 2018. In May 2019, it was reported that Nawazuddin Siddiqui would appear as a Baba in a song.

Chunky Pandey revealed that his character name Aakhri Pasta came from the film Aakhree Raasta (1986), and the character of Marconi from the film The Great Gambler, which was played by Sujit Kumar. He took him as an inspiration, his clothes, that moustache, and created Aakhri Pasta.

=== Filming ===
Principal photography began on 9 July 2018 in London. The filming of the song "Ek Chumma", featuring lead casts was held on mid July 2018. Choreographed by Farah Khan, the song was entirely shot in United Kingdom, over 5 locations spread across London and its outskirts, including at the House of Lords and Kensington Palace. The first schedule was wrapped on 21 July 2018.

The second schedule started in September 2018 in Rajasthan, with filming in Ranthambore forest. Later the production moved to Jaisalmer Palace for filming funny war sequences. Later, in October 2018 the team constructed a huge set Chitrakoot grounds in Andheri. The filming was wrapped on 20 November 2018, except the song shoots.

A song featuring Siddiqui along with lead casts was shot in May 2019, Choreographed by Ganesh Acharya, the song has 5 500 background dancers and was shot at Film City, Mumbai. A song featuring Kumar, choreographed by Acharya was shot in late June 2018. The song was shot at a huge set erected at Mumbai with 200-250 background dancers. A Qawwali song featuring Rana Daggubati and lead casts, with 200 background dancers was filmed in August 2019.

=== Post-production ===
Post-production for the film began by December 2018, once the film completed its shooting and went for eight months as the film involved extensive computer graphics and visual effects. The VFX works of the film was done by DNEG. In mid-October 2019, the film received a U/A certificate from the Censor Board, with a finalised runtime of 146 minutes.

== Music ==
The film's music is composed by Sohail Sen, Farhad Samji and Sandeep Shirodkar. The music rights were bagged by T-Series.

The soundtrack consists of five songs, namely, "Ek Chumma", "Shaitan Ka Saala", "The Bhoot Song", "Chammo", and "Badla". Lyrics were written by Farhad Samji, Sameer Anjaan and Vayu.

== Marketing ==
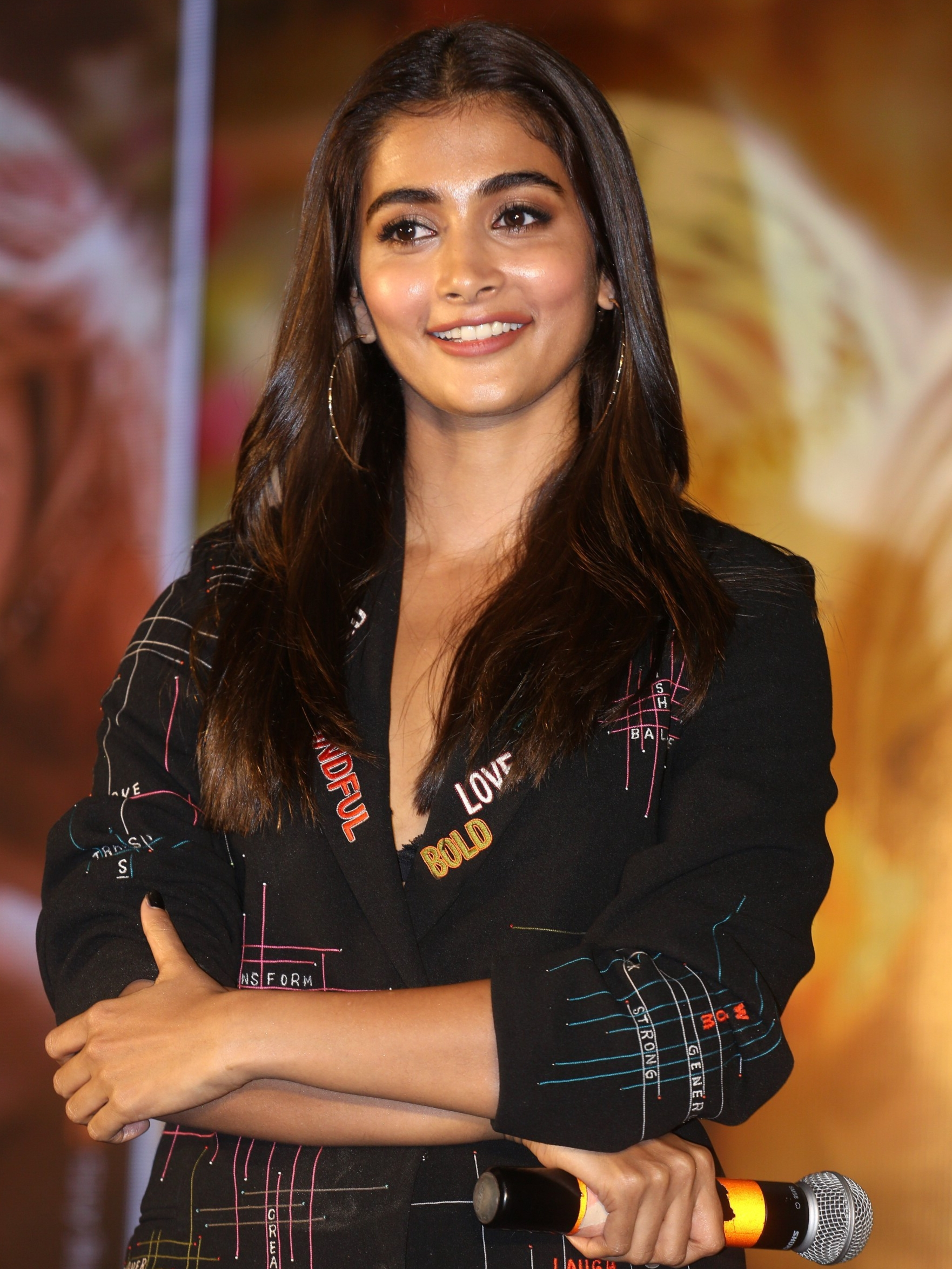
Pooja Hegde promoting Housefull 4 in 2019

In early September 2019, it was reported that promotion of the film would begin in late September, with makers planning a four-week promotion. On 24 September 2019, the logo of Housefull 4 was revealed.

On 25 September, the makers released the posters of lead casts in every hour spread across from the years 1419 to 2019, for the first time in Indian cinema. The official trailer of the film was released on 27 September 2019 and garnered over 38 million views in 24 hours of its release. The trailer launch event was held at PVR Cinemas, Juhu in Mumbai with the film's cast and crew present at the event. The trailer was launched India, United Kingdom, Australia, and Dubai, becoming the film Indian film to do so. On 7 October 2019, the song "Shaitan Ka Saala"'s launch event was held at Hyderabad, with Akshay Kumar, Kriti Sanon and Pooja Hegde launching the song. In mid October 2019, the entire casts travelled in Indian Railways from Mumbai to Delhi, becoming the first film to do so.

== Release ==
=== Theatrical ===
The film was theatrically released in India on 25 October 2019 during the Diwali festival. The film was released by Fox Star Studios in India.

=== Home media ===
Housefull 4's digital streaming rights were acquired by Disney+ Hotstar. The film started streaming on Disney+ Hotstar from 20 December 2019.

== Reception ==
=== Box office ===
Housefull 4 grossed ₹19.08 crore in India on its opening day. The film had huge opening than its previous films, becoming the highest first day grosser of the series. The film collected ₹37.89 crore in two days of its release. The film grossed ₹53 crore in its opening weekend, becoming one of the highest Diwali release opening weekend grosser. Housefull 4 grossed over ₹100 crore in five days of its release in India.

As of 5 December 2019, with a gross of ₹245 crore in India and ₹51 crore overseas, the film has a worldwide gross collection of ₹296 crore and is the 7th highest-grossing Hindi film of 2019.

=== Critical reception ===
On the review aggregator website Rotten Tomatoes, 33% of 6 critics' reviews are positive, with an average rating of 4/10.

Komal Nahta of Film Information said, "Housefull 4 is not a very entertaining fare and has ordinary merits. On the one hand is the festival period which will work in its favour and on the other hand is the word of mouth which will work against its interests." Sreeparna Sengupta of The Times of India, giving two and half stars out of five, noted that due to general silliness, there were mindless comic moments and scenes of low-brow humour in the film. She opined that it was a drag in portions and jokes were stale. She concluded, "Overall, Housefull 4 ends up as a complete mad caper. Which, if you're a fan of the Housefull brand of comedy, might appeal to you. But if you are not, then proceed with caution. Monika Rawal Kukreja of Hindustan Times reviewed the film and wrote "Housefull 4 is quite the comic extravaganza that offers you a heavy dose of laughter this festive season if you can keep your expectations in check."

== Controversies ==
Director Sajid Khan was originally scheduled to direct the film; in October 2018, in the wake of the ongoing "Me Too" movement in India, Khan was accused by actresses Saloni Chopra, Rachel White and journalist Kma Upadhyay of sexual assault and misconduct. Following the accusations, Khan tweeted that he would step down as director, while lead actor Akshay Kumar tweeted that he was cancelling shooting for the film and that he would not work with the accused until the investigation was complete. Later on, Nana Patekar too left the production in the wake of allegations of inappropriate behaviour and touch alleged by victim Tanushree Dutta. Rana Daggubati stepped into essay the role which Nana was supposed to be playing.

Farhad Samji, who co-directed Housefull 3 replaced Sajid Khan as the director.
