= Sajid Khan (director) =

Indian film director (born 1970)

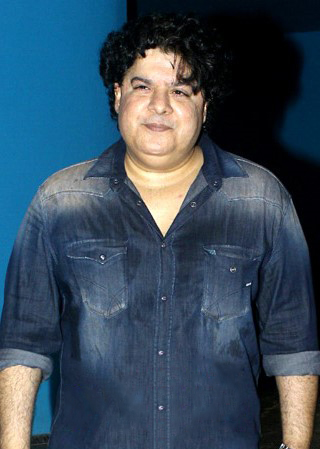
- Khan in 2017
- Born: Sajid Kamran Khan; 23 November 1970 (age 55); Mumbai, Maharashtra, India
- Occupations: Filmmaker; television presenter; comedian; actor
- Relatives: Honey Irani (aunt); Daisy Irani (aunt); Farah Khan (sister); Zoya Akhtar (cousin); Farhan Akhtar (cousin); Shirish Kunder (brother-in-law)

Sajid Kamran Khan (born 23 November 1970) is an Indian film director, television presenter, comedian and an actor who works in the Hindi film industry. He was best known for the Housefull film series, Heyy Babyy (2007) and Humshakals (2014). Khan also served as a judge on the Indian reality television show Nach Baliye. He is the brother of choreographer Farah Khan. In 2022, he participated in Bigg Boss 16.

He is Parsi as some of his ancestors are Parsi.

== Early life ==
Sajid Khan was born in Mumbai, Maharashtra, the son of former stuntman-turned-director Kamran Khan and his wife Menaka Khan (née Irani). He has one sister, Farah Khan, who is a choreographer, director, producer and actor. Farah's husband, Shirish Kunder, is also a producer, editor and director of films. Khan has other connections to the film industry: former actresses Honey Irani and Daisy Irani are his mother's sisters and filmmakers Farhan Akhtar and Zoya Akhtar are his maternal cousins.

Khan completed his primary education from Maneckji Cooper School in Mumbai and then graduated from Mithibai College. Hindi film actor Ajay Devgn was his college friend.

His father Kamran used to direct black-and-white B-grade films featuring actor Dara Singh but in an attempt to transition into mainstream cinema, he invested his life savings and mortgaged his assets to produce an ambitious project starring Sanjeev Kumar. However, midway through production, Kumar reportedly left the film, leaving it incomplete and causing Kamran significant financial ruin. In order to repay the debts, the family had to sell everything they owned, including cars and jewellery, and Sajid, at age 16 and while still a college student, had to start DJing at various parties and social events.

== Career ==
=== Television host and judge ===
Khan began his career as a host of the TV show Main Bhi Detective in 1995.

He then hosted a music countdown show Ikke Pe Ikka in 1996. The show entered the Limca Book of Records as the longest running countdown show to be aired on Indian television with the same host.

In Kehne Mein Kya Harz Hai he played triple roles; the show, which aired on Sony TV, made 200 episodes which were aired from 1997 to 2001. It was a television talk and comedy show featuring humorous interviews, light banter, and celebrity interactions, often parodying older Hindi movies.

In 2008, he hosted a talk show, Sajid's Superstars and also judged India's Got Talent season 2.

Along with Terrence Lewis and Shilpa Shetty, Khan was a judge on Nach Baliye Season 5 (2012–2013) and Season 6 (2013–2014).

=== Stand-up comedy ===
He also did a stand-up comedy show Sajid No. 1 in 2003. His next show was Super Sale in 2005.

=== Film director ===
Khan started his directorial career with the anthology horror film Darna Zaroori Hai (2006), which had six short stories, out of which he directed one story – the story about a man going to watch a movie passing through a graveyard (starring Manoj Pahwa and Sarita Joshi) called The Graveyard. He then directed Heyy Babyy (2007), his first full-length effort, followed by the films Housefull (2010) and Housefull 2 (2012); all three were successful. He then went on to direct two films in the next two years, the first being Himmatwala (2013), a remake of the 1983 movie Himmatwala, which became a critical and commercial failure and the second being Humshakals (2014), both of which are generally ranked amongst the worst Indian films of all time by critics.

=== Film actor ===
Khan has also acted in the movie Jhooth Bole Kauwa Kaate (1998). He also made a brief appearance in Main Hoon Na (2004), Mujhse Shaadi Karogi (2004) and Happy New Year (2014).

== Personal life ==
While filming Housefull 2 in 2011, Khan began a romantic relationship with actress Jacqueline Fernandez. The relationship attracted media coverage in India and there was speculation of an impending wedding. However, the relationship ended in May 2013.

== Allegations of sexual harassment ==
In the wake of the MeToo movement in India, since October 2018, Sajid has been accused of sexual harassment by several female colleagues. Women who have accused Khan of sexual harassment include Mandana Karimi, Saloni Chopra, Rachel White, Simran Suri, Marina Kuwar, Aahana Kumra, Dimple Paula, Sherlyn Chopra, and journalist Karishma Upadhyay. The BBC television documentary Death in Bollywood (2021), which covers the suicide of Indian actress Jiah Khan, also included accusations of harassment against Khan on Jiah by her sister Karishma Khan.

The Indian Film and Television Directors’ Association imposed a ban on Khan from directing films in light of the allegations. It was subsequently revoked a year later on 10 December 2019.

Though he denied the allegations, Khan stepped down as the director of Housefull 4 (2019) and was eventually replaced by Farhad Samji, the co-director of Housefull 3 (2016).

== Filmography ==
Year	Title	Director	Writer
2006	Darna Zaroori Hai	Yes	Yes
2007	Heyy Babyy	Yes	Yes
2010	Housefull	Yes	Yes
2012	Housefull 2	Yes	Yes
2013	Himmatwala	Yes	Yes
2014	Humshakals	Yes	Yes

=== As actor ===
Year	Title	Role	Notes
1998	Jhooth Bole Kauwa Kaate	Chunky	
2004	Main Hoon Na	Band member in song "Gori Gori"	Cameo
2004	Mujhse Shaadi Karogi	Himself	Cameo
2014	Happy New Year	Himself	Cameo

=== Television ===
Year	Title	Role	Notes	Ref.
1995	Main Bhi Detective	Host		
1996–2007	Ikke Pe Ikka	Host		
1997	Khel Khel Mein	Host		
1997–2001	Kehne Me Kya Harj Hai	Host		
2002–2003	Akting-Akting	Teacher		
2003	Sajid No. 1	Host		
2004	Sab Kuch Ho Sakta Hai	Host		
2005	Super Sale	Host		
2007–2008	Champion Chaalbaaz No.1	Judge		
2008	Sitaare Zameen Par	Host		
2008	Sajid's Superstars	Host		
2010	India's Got Talent	Judge	Season 2	
2012–2014	Nach Baliye	Judge	Season 5–6	
2013	Taarak Mehta Ka Ooltah Chashmah	Himself	Guest	
2015	Comedy Nights with Kapil	Guest host		
2015–2016	India's Best Dramebaaz	Judge		
2016	Yaaron Ki Baraat	Host		
2022–2023	Bigg Boss 16	Contestant	10th Place	
