= Yaaron Ki Baraat =

- Genre: Talk show
- Written by: Raaj Shaandilyaa
- Directed by: Arun Sheshkumar
- Creative directors: Partha Thakur, Neeraj Sharma
- Starring: See below
- Country of origin: India
- Original language: Hindi
- No. of seasons: 1
- No. of episodes: 17

Production
- Production locations: Mumbai, India
- Camera setup: Multi-camera

Original release
- Network: Zee TV
- Release: 8 October – 11 December 2016

Yaaron Ki Baraat is an Indian Hindi talk television series which premiered on 8 October 2016 on Zee TV. The last episode was telecast on 11 December 2016.

== Overview ==
Yaaron Ki Baraat was a Hindi chat show hosted by Sajid Khan and Riteish Deshmukh. The show invited two celebrity guests every weekend to talk about their bond. The first episode featured Amitabh Bachchan and Shatrughan Sinha.

== Celebrity guest ==
- Amitabh Bachchan and Shatrughan Sinha
- Farah Khan and Karan Johar
- Parineeti Chopra and Sania Mirza
- Yuvraj Singh and Harbhajan Singh
- Varun Dhawan and Arjun Kapoor
- Vishal Dadlani and Shekhar Ravjiani and Sunidhi Chauhan
- Jackie Shroff and Sunil Shetty
- Shraddha Kapoor and Farhan Akhtar
- Ajay Devgn and Sanjay Dutt and Abhishek Bachchan
- Shah Rukh Khan and Anushka Sharma
- Vivek Oberoi and Aftab Shivdasani
- Boman Irani and Rajkumar Hirani
- Himesh Reshammiya and Shaan
- Huma Qureshi and Saqib Saleem
- Vidya Balan and Sujoy Ghosh
- Sanjay Kapoor and Arbaaz Khan and Chunky Pandey
- Akshay Kumar and Sajid Nadiawala

== Host ==
- Sajid Khan
- Riteish Deshmukh
