= Sajid's Superstars =

- Genre: Talk show
- Presented by: Sajid Khan
- Country of origin: India
- Original language: Hindi

Original release
- Network: Colors TV
- Release: 26 July 2008 – October 2008

Sajid's Superstars is an Indian television talk show that aired Colors TV, mainly featuring celebrities from Hindi or Bollywood cinema. Sajid Khan is the host of the show and its first season was aired in between July 2008 and October 2008.
