= Millind Gaba =

Indian singer and actor

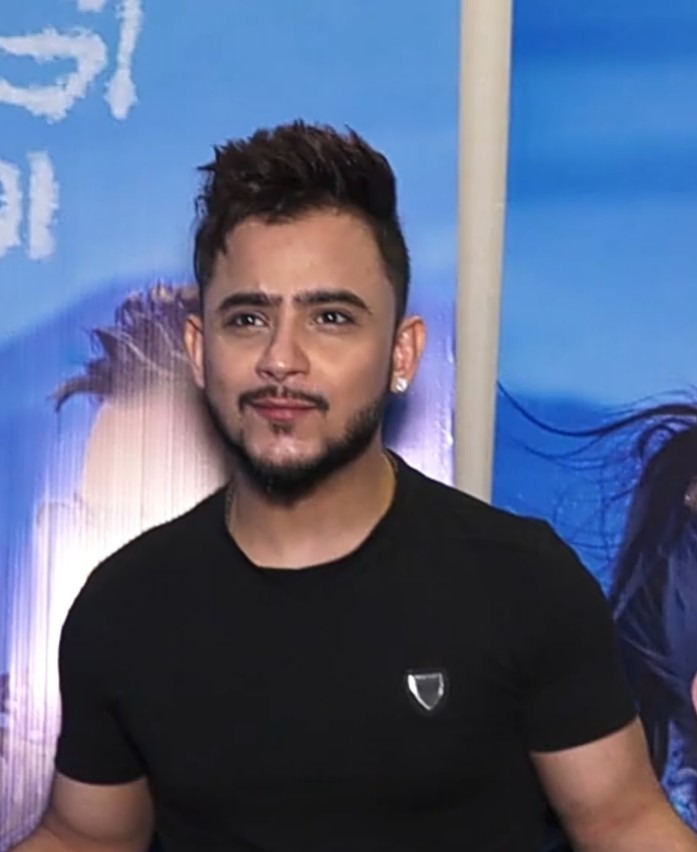
- Born: 7 December 1990 (age 35)
- Other names: MusicMG, Music MG, MG Music, Milind Gaba
- Occupations: Singer; songwriter; music producer; actor
- Spouse: Pria Beniwal (m. 2022)
- Musical career
- Instrument: Vocals
- Years active: 2010-present
- Labels: T-Series; Speed Records

Millind Gaba (born 7 December 1990) is an Indian singer, songwriter, music producer and actor associated with Punjabi and Bollywood music. He is known for his songs "Nazar Lag Jayegi", "She Don't Know" and "Yaar Mod Do". In 2021, he participated in Bigg Boss OTT 1.

== Career ==
=== As a singer ===
His popular singles are "Nazar Lag Jayegi", "She Don't Know", "Main Teri Ho Gayi", "Zindagi Di Paudi", "Peele Peele", "Beautiful", "Nachunga Aise", "Kya Karu" and "Dilli Shehar". He has worked with Punjabi language singer Guru Randhawa in the song "Yaar Mod Do".

The music video for his song "She Don't Know" was released on 8 January 2019 by T-Series on YouTube. The video had amassed over 500 million views as of January 2021.

=== As an actor ===
He made his debut as an actor in the Punjabi film Stupid 7 (2013).

== Personal life ==
Gaba was born on 7 December 1990. He married fashion blogger Pria Beniwal, the sister of Indian YouTuber Harsh Beniwal, on 16 April 2022.

== Discography ==
=== Film songs ===
Year	Song	Movie	Co-singer	Music director
2015	Saddi Dilli	Dilliwali Zaalim Girlfriend	Solo	Himself
2015	Welcome Back (Title Track)	Welcome Back	Mika Singh	Himself, Mika Singh
2016	Malamaal	Housefull 3	Mika Singh, Ps Saifi, Miss Pooja	Himself, Mika Singh
2020	Nachi Nachi	Street Dancer 3D	Neeti Mohan, Dhvani Bhanushali	Sachin-Jigar
2021	Aye Haye	Time to Dance	Vishal Mishra, Aditi Singh Sharma	Vishal Mishra
2021	Main Teri Ho Gayi	Sardar Ka Grandson	Pallavi Gaba	Tanishk Bagchi
2023	Peene De	Yaariyan 2	Master Saleem	Manan Bhardwaj

=== Singles ===
Year	Song	Album	Co-singer	Music director	Ref
2017	"Main Tera Ho Gaya Song"	Main Tera Ho Gaya	Solo	Music MG, Himself	
2017	"Sohnea 1"	Broken But Beautiful soundtrack	Miss Pooja, Milind Gaba	MG Music	
2017	"Sohnea 2"	Broken But Beautiful soundtrack	Miss Pooja, Milind Gaba	MG Music	
2018	"Nazar Lag Jayegi"	Nazar Lag Jayegi	Kamal Raja	Himself	
2018	"Jimmy Choo"	FryDay		Himself	
2018	"Oh Ho Ho / Soni De Nakhre"	T-series mixtape	Himself with Sukhbir and Mehak	Abhijit Vaghani	
2018	"Kalesh"	Kalesh	Himself with Mika Singh	Himself	
2019	"Meri Baari"	Meri Baari	Solo	Music MG	
2020	"Naam"	Naam	Tulsi Kumar, Millind Gaba	Himself	
2020	"Kya Karu ?"	Kya Karu ?	Parampara Tandon, Millind Gaba	Music MG	
2020	"Na Jaa Bewafa-Freestyle"	Na Jaa Bewafa-Freestyle	ItsIncubius	Music MG	
2020	"Nachunga Aise Song"	Nachunga Aise	Solo	Music MG	
2021	"Shanti"		Solo	Music MG	
	"Kamara Hilayangu"	Kamara Hilayangu	Gippy Grewal	Music MG	
	"Baby Town Sone"	Baby Town Sone	Bhoomi Trivedi	Music MG	
2022	"Paris Ka Trip"	Paris Ka Trip	Yo Yo Honey Singh		

== Television ==
Year	Title	Role	Notes	Ref.
2021	Bigg Boss OTT	Contestant	Evicted Day 29/42	
