= Nargis Fakhri =

American actress (born 1979)

- Fakhri in 2017
- Born: October 20, 1979 (age 47); Queens, New York, U.S.
- Occupation: Actress
- Years active: 2011–present
- Spouse: Tony Beig (m. 2025)
- Modelling information
- Height: 5 ft 9 in (1.75 m)
- Hair colour: Brown
- Eye colour: Brown
- Agency: Ford Models; La Agencia; East West Models; Nova Models
- Website: www.nargisfakhri.com

Nargis Fakhri (born October 20, 1979) is an American actress and model who primarily works in the Hindi cinema.

After working as a model in the United States, Fakhri came to prominence in India with the Imtiaz Ali's 2011 musical drama Rockstar opposite Ranbir Kapoor, which went on to become a major critical and commercial success and has achieved a cult following. She subsequently played a war correspondent in the political thriller Madras Cafe (2013), starred in the commercially successful comedies Main Tera Hero (2014) and Housefull 3 (2016), and played actress Sangeeta Bijlani in the biographical sports drama Azhar (2016). She has since portrayed a villain in the Hollywood action comedy Spy (2015) and a quirky character in Housefull 5 (2025), the fifth installment of the Housefull film series; both films were commercial successes.

== Early life and modeling ==
Fakhri was born on October 20, 1979, in Queens, New York City, to Mohammed Fakhri, and Marie Fakhri, a former police officer. Her father is Pakistani, and her mother is Czech. She has one younger sister, Aliya. Fakhri's parents divorced when she was six, and her father died a few years later. Because of her mixed Pakistani-Czech ethnicity and American nationality, Fakhri describes herself a "global citizen". Fakhri grew up in Mohegan Lake, New York, in Yorktown.

Fakhri started her career as a model at the age of 16. In her later years, she appeared as a contestant on the second and third cycle of America's Next Top Model (2004). Although Fakhri was selected for the first two challenges of both the cycles, she failed to make up to the third challenge for the top twelve contestants. She subsequently modeled professionally in America, working for freelance agencies, and appearing regularly at fashion shows. Fakhri's fame increased when she appeared in a popular Indian print campaign for the 2009 Kingfisher Calendar. Her appearance in the Kingfisher Calendar attracted the attention of Indian filmmaker Imtiaz Ali. He selected her for a role in the Hindi romantic drama Rockstar. Fakhri later said that she agreed to work in India so that she could "relate to [her] culture" and get "close to [her] roots [Pakistan]", because India and Pakistan share similar cultures.

== Acting career ==
=== Career beginnings and breakthrough (2011–2015) ===
Fakhri made her acting debut with a female lead role in Imtiaz Ali's musical romantic drama Rockstar in 2011. The film follows the journey of an aspiring musician from a humble background to international stardom after the death of his passionate lover. Rockstar was the first film in India to show a Kashmiri Pandit wedding, and saw Fakhri as a free-spirited rich brat, hailing from the Kashmiri Pandit background. Due to her poor command in Hindi, Fakhri's voice was dubbed over by the voice artist Mona Ghosh Shetty. The film received overwhelming responses from critics, but their opinions toward her were mixed, though she was praised for her looks. Film critic Taran Adarsh wrote: "Nargis is a stunner as far as looks are concerned, but isn't persuasive in poignant moments", however, he praised her on-screen chemistry with co-star Ranbir Kapoor. Raja Sen of Rediff noted that she is an "exotically ravishing heroine, one so pretty we forgive her occasionally stilted diction", while Nikhat Kazmi praised her performance and said that Fakhri "stands tall as the delectable Heer who sizzles on screen with her unconventional ways". With a gross revenue of ₹1.07 billion (US$11 million), Rockstar was one of the top-grossing Hindi films of the year. Fakhri's performance in the film earned her several Best Female Debut nominations at various award ceremonies, including a Filmfare nomination.

Her next release was opposite John Abraham in the Shoojit Sircar's political thriller Madras Cafe (2013), a drama set during the time of the Indian intervention in the Sri Lankan civil war and the assassination of former Indian prime minister Rajiv Gandhi. Her portrayal was of a British war correspondent in Sri Lanka, and was inspired by many war correspondents, including Anita Pratap. Unlike her debut film, Fakhri dubbed her own dialogues and was approached for the film because Sircar wanted "a girl who looked Indian but had an [English] accent". Upon release, Madras Cafe received acclaim from the critics, and the performances of the lead actors were praised. Saibal Chatterjee said Fakhri "strikes the right notes", whereas Rajeev Masand called her "pleasantly competent". Anuj Kumar of The Hindu was particularly impressed with the film and thought that Fakhri has proved that she has more to her than just a "prominent pout". Later that year, she made a special appearance in the action comedy Phata Poster Nikhla Hero to perform in the item number "Dhating Naach" with the film's lead actor Shahid Kapoor.

The following year, Fakhri collaborated with Varun Dhawan and Ileana D'Cruz for the romantic comedy Main Tera Hero, a remake of the 2011 Telugu film Kandireega, produced by Balaji Motion Pictures and directed by David Dhawan. Set in Bangkok, she played Ayesha, a Don's daughter, who falls for an impetuous brat. The film was a financial success, but received mixed reviews from critics. For her performance in the film, Rohit Khilnani said that Fakhri "is not bad" and that "she fits well in this masala comedy and doesn't disappoint". Taran Adarsh however, disagreed, and said though she "looks great", she needs to "polish her acting skills". She next appeared in a popular item number titled "Yaar Naa Miley" with Salman Khan for Sajid Nadiadwala's action thriller Kick. The song was well received by critics and was immensely popular among the audience. Later that year, she starred in Paul Feig's action comedy Spy, her first project in Hollywood. The film follows the transformation of desk-bound CIA analyst Susan Cooper (McCarthy) into a field agent who attempts to foil the black market sale of a suitcase nuke. Featuring alongside Melissa McCarthy, Jason Statham and Jude Law, Fakhri was cast in her first antagonist role, portraying Lia, a secret agent. The film and her performance received praise from critics. John Boone of Entertainment Tonight noted how much she stood out in the "fewer quieter scenes" of the film. Fakhri's performance earned her an MTV Movie Award for Best Fight nomination. Spy emerged as one of top-grossing productions of the year, earning $235.7 million worldwide.

=== Further work and recent roles (2016–present) ===
Fakhri began 2016 with a special appearance in the Tamil film Saagasam, to perform in the item number "Desi Girl" with the film's lead actor Prashanth. The song, described as a peppy "bar number", was choreographed by Raju Sundaram, and featured hundred extras. Fakhri next appeared alongside Emraan Hashmi and Prachi Desai in the biographical sports drama Azhar. She portrayed Sangeeta Bijlani, an actress and the second wife of cricketer Mohammad Azharuddin. In an interview with Mid-Day, Azharuddin said that the film is about his God, marriage and match-fixing. Azhar generated controversy when a CBI officer, who investigated his case during match-fixing, claimed that he has a video tape in which Azharuddin had confessed his involvement in the match-fixing, however, he failed to prove it. Critics praised the film's narration, but were divided in their opinion as to her performance. Namrata Joshi of Outlook noted that she was "likeable" in her part, however, Devesh Sharma of Filmfare wrote that she brought "plasticky expressions". Commercially, the film was moderately successful at the box office. She then took on a supporting role for the third installment of the Housefull film series. The ensemble comedy film saw her playing a rich brat who convinces who falls in love with a con-man (Abhishek Bachchan). Reviews of the film and her performance were largely negative. Writing for Firstpost, Subhash K. Jha criticized Fakhri for her inclination toward a film where she was "treated as [a] visual attraction [...] and nothing else". Nevertheless, the film was a major commercial success, grossing ₹1.88 billion (US$20 million) billion worldwide. Fakhri then played a minor role in the adventure comedy Dishoom. Her portrayal was of star Saqib Saleem's friend, which she described as a "cameo".

Fakhri's final role in 2016 was as Christina, an American citizen in search of an instrumentalist capable of playing the banjo, in Ravi Jadhav's musical Banjo. Co-starring Riteish Deshmukh, the film was described as a tribute to rappers living in Mumbai's ghettos. Upon release, the film received mixed reviews and under performed at the Box Office India. Writing for the Times of India, Renuka Vyavahare thought that she "overdoes the American accent but grows on you eventually." Koimoi wrote that "Why would you waste your money to watch Nargis' acting and Riteish juggling between his Lai Bhaari and Rockstar character." Saibal Chatterjee of NDTV noted that her part in the drama is the film's "biggest undoing." In October 2017 Fakhri was selected as a One Young World counselor, alongside Kofi Annan, Doutzen Kroes, and Cher to speak at their summit in Bogota. Fakhri next starred in her second Hollywood production, the romantic comedy 5 Weddings (2018), opposite Rajkumar Rao. Reza Noorani of The Times of India disliked the chemistry between Fakhri and Rao, and said that she "doesn't bring much to the table". Fakhri begun 2019 with Bhushan Patel-directed horror thriller Amavas. As her previous release, the film received mixed reviews and performed poorly at the box-office.

In 2025, Fakhri appeared opposite Akshay Kumar in Housefull 5. The film was released in two versions, titled Housefull 5A and Housefull 5B, each featuring a different climax and murderer. Devesh Sharma stated that she adds to the "glamour quotient", but has nothing to do in the film.

== Personal life ==
Fakhri began dating actor Uday Chopra in 2013. The relationship attracted substantial media coverage in India and they speculated on an impending marriage. However, the couple broke up in the end of 2017. In May 2018, Fakhri confirmed and announced her relationship with filmmaker Matt Alonzo on Instagram, which ended in 2019. She is a self-professed eggetarian. In 2024, Fakhri stated, "Marriage is something that does not define me".

On November 26, 2024, Fakhri's sister Aliya was arrested for murdering her ex-boyfriend and his female friend, by setting their garage on fire. Fakhri later revealed that she has been estranged from her sister for twenty years and refused to comment on the crime.

On February 16, 2025, Fakhri married her Kashmiri boyfriend, Tony Beig, a Los Angeles-based businessman, after dating him for three years.

== Filmography ==
=== Film ===
Key
†	Denotes films that have not yet been released

- All films are in Hindi unless otherwise noted

Year	Title	Role	Notes	Ref.
2011	Rockstar	Heer Kaul		
2013	Madras Cafe	Jaya Sahni		
2013	Phata Poster Nikhla Hero	–	Special appearance in song "Dhating Naach"	
2014	Main Tera Hero	Ayesha Shingal		
2014	Kick	Angel	Special appearance in song "Yaar Na Miley"	
2015	Spy	Lia	Hollywood film	
2016	Saagasam	–	Tamil film; special appearance in song "Desi Girl"	
2016	Azhar	Sangeeta Bijlani		
2016	Housefull 3	Saraswati "Sarah" Patel		
2016	Dishoom	Samaira Dalal	Cameo appearance	
2016	Banjo	Christina "Chris"		
2018	5 Weddings	Shania Dhaliwal	American film	
2019	Amavas	Ahaana		
2020	Torbaaz	Ayesha		
2023	Shiv Shastri Balboa	Siya		
2025	Housefull 5	Kaanchi		
2025	Mastiii 4	Menka		

=== Television ===
Year	Title	Role	Platform	Ref.
2023	Tatlubaaz	Isabelle Tripathi	Zee5	

=== Music videos ===
Year	Song	Singer(s)	Ref.
2017	"If My Indian Dad Was A Rapper"	Lilly Singh	
2017	"Habitaan Vigaad Di"	Parichay feat. Nargis Fakhri and Kardinal Offishall	
2017	"Woofer"	Dr. Zeus feat. Snoop Dogg, Zora Randhawa and Nargis Fakhri	
2018	"Tere Vaastey"	Satinder Sartaaj	
2022	"Palabi Kothai"	Tasnim Anika	
2022	"Fayaah Fayaah"	Guru Randhawa	
2025	"Teri Yaadein"	Yo Yo Honey Singh, Grini	
2025	"Mafia"	Yo Yo Honey Singh	

== Discography ==
=== Singles ===
Year	Song	Notes	Ref.
2017	"Habitaan Vigaad Di"	as a featured artist	
2017	"Woofer"	as a featured artist	

== Awards and nominations ==
Year	Film	Award	Category	Result	Ref
2012	Rockstar	IIFA Awards	Hottest Pair (shared with Ranbir Kapoor)	Won	
2012	Rockstar	Filmfare Awards	Best Female Debut	Nominated	
2012	Rockstar	Stardust Awards	Superstar of Tomorrow – Female	Nominated	
2012	Rockstar	Zee Cine Awards	Best Female Debut	Nominated	
2014	Madras Cafe	BIG Star Entertainment Awards	Most Entertaining Actor in a Social/Drama Film – Female	Nominated	
2015	Main Tera Hero	Stardust Awards	Breakthrough Supporting Performance – Female	Nominated	
2015	Main Tera Hero	Filmfare Glamour and Style Awards	Ciroc Not The Usual Award	Won	
2016	Spy	MTV Movie Awards	Best Fight (with Melissa McCarthy)	Nominated	
2017	Housefull 3	BIG Zee Entertainment Awards	Most Entertaining Actor in a Comedy Film – Female	Nominated	
2023	—N/a	Distinctive International Arab Festivals Awards	Outstanding Contributions to the Entertainment Industry	Won	

== See also ==
- List of Hindi film actresses
