= Arav Chowdharry =

Indian actor and model

- Born: 23 November 1981 (age 44); Jaipur, Rajasthan, India
- Occupations: Actor; model
- Notable work: Mahabharat

Arav Chowdharry (born 23 November 1981) is an Indian actor and model. He is best known for his role as Bhishma in the TV show Mahabharat. He is from Jaipur. He is an Indian actor who appeared in several Bollywood movies such as Dhoom and Housefull 3. He got fame for his role as Bhishma Pitamah in the 2013 edition of Mahabharat on television. He has also acted in a television series named Iss Pyaar Ko Kya Naam Doon? Ek Baar Phir.

== Filmography ==
- Laado (2001)
- Lakshya (2004) credited as Sanjay M Singh
- Dhoom (2004) as Rahul
- Right Yaaa Wrong (2010)
- Ajith (2014) – Kannada film
- Vivegam (2017) as Shawn (Tamil film)
- Housefull 3 (2016) as Rajeev
- Bharat (2019)
- Action (2019) as Imran Kalli (Tamil film)
- Razakar (2024) Telugu film

== Television ==
Years	Title	Role
1997	Zindagi Mil Ke Bitayenge	Unknown
1998	Captain Vyom	Captain Blaze
2002	Dhadkan	Unknown
2009–2010	Jhansi Ki Rani	Mangal Pandey
2010	Gulaal	Raman
2011–2012	Veer Shivaji	Dara Shikoh
2013	Bharat Ka Veer Putra – Maharana Pratap	Rana Sanga
2013	Iss Pyaar Ko Kya Naam Doon? Ek Baar Phir	Indrajeet Sarkar
2013–2014	Mahabharat	Bhishma
2017	Aarambh	Purohit Indramitra
2019	Jag Janani Maa Vaishno Devi – Kahani Mata Rani Ki	Senapathi Mahipal
2021–2023	Sasural Simar ka 2	Gajendra Oswal
2023	Ali Baba	Iblis
2024	Shrimad Ramayan	Dasharatha
2024	Shiv Shakti – Tap Tyaag Tandav	Mahishasura
2025	Veer Hanuman	Kesari
2025	Dhaakad Beera	Dushyant

Web series
Year	Title	Role	Notes
2021	Sunflower	Ramesh Kapoor	
2025	Zindagi Ka U-Turn	Jaiveer Oberoi	Microdrama
