= Tarun Mansukhani =

Indian film director

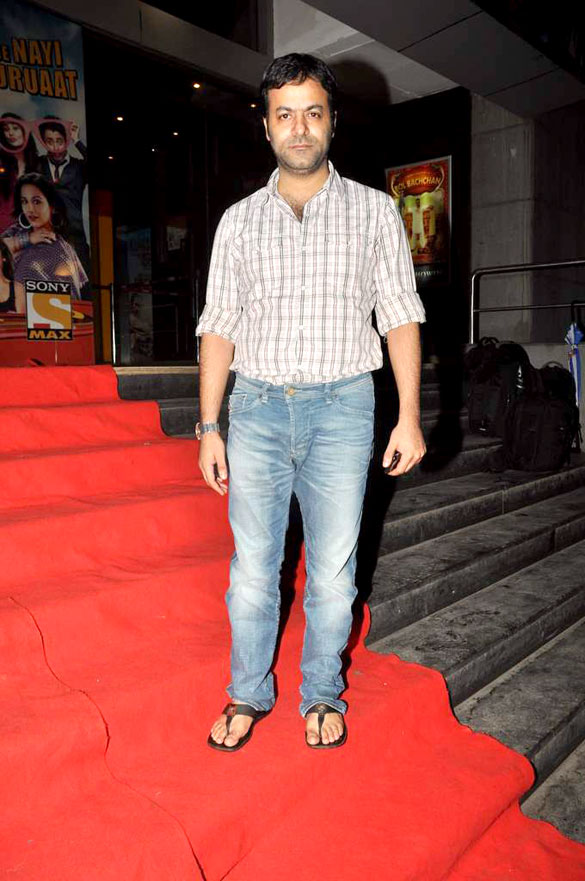
- Occupations: Film director, screenwriter
- Years active: 1998–present
- Spouse: Karuna Mansukhani (divorced)

Tarun Mansukhani is an Indian film director and screenwriter who works in Hindi films. He is best known for directing the 2008 romantic comedy film Dostana.

== Filmography ==
As director

Year	Film	Notes
2008	Dostana	
2019	Drive	
2025	Housefull 5	co-wrote dialogues with Farhad Samji

As assistant director

Year	Film
1998	Kuch Kuch Hota Hai
2001	Kabhi Khushi Kabhie Gham
2003	Kal Ho Naa Ho
2006	Kabhi Alvida Naa Kehna
