= Stardust Award for Best Supporting Actor =

Film award in India

- Awarded for: Best Performance by an Actor in a Supporting Role
- Country: India
- Presented by: Stardust
- First award: 2003 (for performances in films released around 2002)
- Currently held by: Rishi Kapoor for Kapoor & Sons

The Stardust Best Supporting Actor Award is chosen by the readers of the annual Stardust magazine. The award honours a star that has made an impact with their acting and represents new talent.

== Multiple wins ==
Wins	Recipient
2	Abhishek Bachchan

== Awards ==
Here is a list of the award winners and the films for which they won.

Year	Actor	Film
2003	Mahesh Manjrekar	Kaante
2004	Boman Irani	Darna Mana Hai
2005	Vivek Oberoi	Yuva
2006	Ritesh Deshmukh	Kyaa Kool Hai Hum
2007	Abhishek Bachchan	Kabhi Alvida Naa Kehna
2008	Irrfan Khan	The Namesake
2009	Tusshar Kapoor	Golmaal Returns
2010	Abhishek Bachchan	Paa
2011	Arjun Rampal	Housefull
2013	Prosenjit Chatterjee; Nawazuddin Siddiqui	Shanghai; Kahaani
2014	Govinda	Happy Ending; Kill Dil
2015	Anil Kapoor	Dil Dhadakne Do
2016	Rishi Kapoor	Kapoor & Sons

== See also ==
- Stardust Awards
- Bollywood
- Cinema of India
