= Madhavgarh =

Coordinates: 24.563°N 80.911°E

- Village
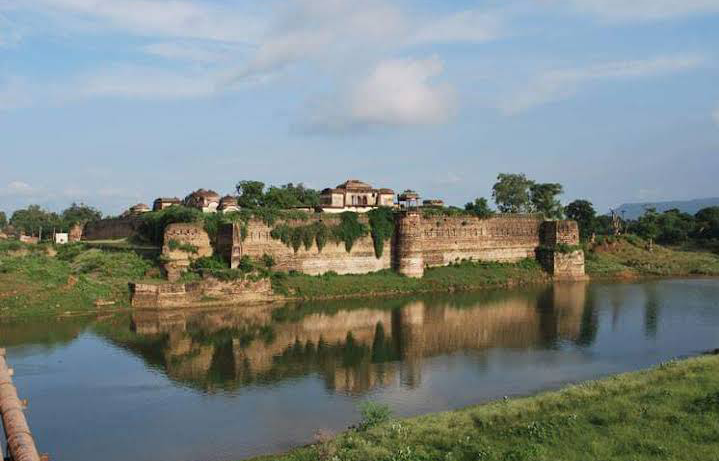
- Madhavgarh Fort

- Location in Madhya Pradesh, India
- Country: India
- State: Madhya Pradesh
- District: Satna
- Founder: Keshav Singh
- Named for: Madhav Singh

Madhavgarh is a small village in the area of Satna district, Madhya Pradesh, India, which is 7 km from Satna. It once was a large kingdom but lost all its glory after the fall of the dynasty that ruled the kingdom and slowly became a village. Madhavgarh's name was inspired by Madhav Singh, who was a real king of nearby Madhavgarh fort. Some sources suggest that Madhav was the younger brother of Bala Dev Singh, who tried to kill his father to become the king and was then banished from the kingdom. Although the name of the kingdom was the same for a long time, it was still not an official name due to clashes with different opinions of different knowledgeable people in the kingdom. When Madhav became the king due to Bala being banished, he made the name 'Madhavgarh' official. In local areas, it is also known for its fort. Although, it is not so well known. Also, it is getting damaged day by day without any maintenance.

== History ==
Madhavgarh was first conquered by Keshav Singh. Since then, only his dynasty has ever ruled there. The kingdom only became more powerful under Parikshitap Singh. He is said to be the real founder of Madhavgarh. He also ruled for the longest time(58 years) from the dynasty. His son Bala Dev Singh tried to kill him so that he could become the king, however, Parikshitap came to know about it just before Bala was about to kill him and banished him from the kingdom forever. That's why he made his younger son, Madhav Singh, the king. Madhav made the kingdom's name official. He also saved the kingdom from being annexed by rival kingdoms two times. He, thus, got a lot of support from the people. After him, no one could rule as strongly as he or his father. The dynasty finally fell in 1584. The kingdom, however, was never annexed by anyone, thereafter. It slowly lost all its glory and it became a deserted village, leaving only the fort as a sign of its past.
