= Housefull 3 =

2016 Indian film by Sajid-Farhad

- Theatrical release poster
- Directed by: Sajid-Farhad
- Written by: Sajid-Farhad (dialogues)
- Screenplay by: Sajid-Farhad; Rajan Agarwal
- Story by: K. Subash; Jitendra Parmar
- Produced by: Sajid Nadiadwala
- Starring: Akshay Kumar; Abhishek Bachchan; Riteish Deshmukh; Jacqueline Fernandez; Nargis Fakhri; Lisa Haydon; Boman Irani; Jackie Shroff
- Cinematography: Vikas Sivaraman
- Edited by: Steven H. Bernard
- Music by: Songs: Sohail Sen; Mika Singh; Shaarib; Toshi; Tanishk Bagchi; Millind Gaba; Score: Julius Packiam
- Production company: Nadiadwala Grandson Entertainment
- Distributed by: Eros International
- Release date: 3 June 2016
- Running time: 134 minutes
- Country: India
- Language: Hindi
- Box office: ₹195 crore

Housefull 3 is a 2016 Indian Hindi-language comedy film co-written and directed by Sajid-Farhad and produced by Nadiadwala Grandson Entertainment. It is the third installment of the Housefull series and stars an ensemble cast consisting of Akshay Kumar, Abhishek Bachchan, Riteish Deshmukh, Jacqueline Fernandez, Nargis Fakhri, Lisa Haydon, Chunky Panday and Jackie Shroff. The film was released on 3 June 2016 and was a commercial success grossing ₹195 crore worldwide.

A sequel Housefull 4 was released on 25 October 2019. A fifth installment titled Housefull 5 with two prints Housefull 5A and Housefull 5B was released on 6 June 2025.

== Plot ==
Three robbers attempt to steal jewels from a building in London, but are captured by the police.

Six years later, Batuk Patel, a wealthy and successful businessman, disapproves marriage of his three daughters, Ganga, Jamuna, and Saraswati, as he believes that the previous ladies in his family were doomed because of marriage of his own family members. One night, at a friend's party, the girls reveal to their friend that secretly, they each have a boyfriend. Ganga, Jamuna, and Saraswati are respectively smitten with Sandy (who wants his own football club and is currently a rookie), Teddy (a wannabe racer), and Bunty (a wannabe rapper). Sandy has a self-destructive split personality named "Sundy", who stems from the racism faced by Sandy, awakening whenever he hears the word "Indian". Unbeknownst to the girls, the boys are only marrying them for Batuk's fortune.

When the girls tell their father about them, Batuk takes help of restaurant owner Aakhri Pasta, who dresses up as a fortune teller who claims that when the girl's husbands first see, speak to, or set foot into Batuk's house, Batuk will die. The girls, wanting to keep their boyfriends, exploit what Pasta said by making them pretend to be disabled. Sandy pretends to be crippled, Teddy blind and Bunty mute. Batuk tests them to see if they're lying, but to no avail. The boys learn of each other's charade and decide to split Batuk's fortune among themselves. At Pasta's restaurant, Batuk reveals to Pasta that his daughters are actually the daughters of Urja Nagre, an underworld crime lord. Batuk, a former associate of Nagre's, takes care of the girls while Nagre is in jail. Batuk had lied about his belief of bad luck from marriages and orchestrated Nagre's imprisonment just so he could secretly marry the girls to his three sons, Rishi, Rohan, and Rajeev, the robbers who tried to steal the jewels, to gain Nagre's fortune. Unbeknownst to him, Nagre has immigrated in London.

While the girls repair a wax statue for Batuk, the boys go into town, where the boys are observed by him to be disabled. Teddy appears mute, Bunty crippled and Sandy blind. Later, Nagre asks Batuk, about his daughter's future husbands. Batuk says that he knows three men suitable for the daughters. Batuk takes Nagre to a Gurdwara to see his sons, claiming they are orphans who do community service. Nagre chooses the three suitable for his daughters.

At Batuk's house, Nagre claims that Batuk owes him 50 billion pounds. Nagre gives the boys 10 days to make up the money, or the girls must marry 'the chosen boys'. During these 10 days, Nagre and "his sons" will also live in Batuk's house, meaning that the girls' boyfriends must act in front of just as they were observed by Batuk and Nagre. During a beer festival, the girls, as part of the boys' plan, get Batuk's sons drunk. The next day, Batuk's sons are happy to have sex with their respective girls, only to find out that they were tricked into accidentally having sex with the maids. The maids demand compensation, or they will sue them with rape charges. Nagre surrenders to his daughters' pleas of love. The next day, the girls take their boys to church, for confession because they felt that they were mocking disables by having the boys act as if they were disabled. After this, the boys and girls feel guilty.

They go to the warehouse of Madame Tussauds to meet their girlfriends as Jamuna had made a wax statue of Teddy there. They instead find Batuk's sons waiting for them, having learned the truth, and their goons attack them. While Teddy and Bunty fight them, Sandy hears a goon and Teddy say "Indian", and Sundy arrives, trying to kill Sandy. Batuk also arrives, having also learned the truth, and is blackmailed by the boys to divide Nagre's fortune into 7 shares. Pasta and the maids then appear as shares increase considerably, with Sundy asking for a share and the maids asking for shares for their babies, resulting in 18 shares of 300 crore, much to Batuk's chagrin. Nagre appears, having lured them all here after finding out about the boys and Batuk's deceptions, and attempts to kill everyone in the warehouse, while the lights turn on and off. As the girls arrive, Rishi, Rohan, and Rajeev see them, and hold them at knifepoint in front of Nagre. Sandy, Teddy, and Bunty then rush to save the girls, injuring themselves in the process. The girls forgive the boys, and Batuk reveals the whole story-planning, while the girls and each of their respective boyfriends reconcile with Urja Nagre, the girls' real father. The girls then say they want to have an Indian wedding, causing Sundy to awaken again.

== Cast ==
- Akshay Kumar as Sanket "Sandy/Sundi Indian Sehgal
- Riteish Deshmukh as Tukaram "Teddy" Chaugule
- Abhishek Bachchan as Bunty Malhotra
- Jacqueline Fernandez as Ganga "Gracy" Nagre
- Lisa Haydon as Jamuna "Jenny" Nagre
- Nargis Fakhri as Saraswati "Sara" Nagre
- Boman Irani as Batuk Patel
- Jackie Shroff as Urja Nagre
- Chunky Panday as Aakhri Pasta
- Samir Kochhar as Rishi Patel
- Nikitin Dheer as Rohan Patel
- Arav Chowdharry as Rajeev Patel

== Reception ==
=== Critical response ===
The film received overwhelmingly negative reviews and criticism for the portrayal of the disabilities and ethnic humor. (Note: Attributed to multiple references:) On the review aggregator website Rotten Tomatoes, 23% of 13 critics' reviews are positive, with an average rating of 4/10.

Anupama Chopra of Hindustan Times called the film, "racist, sexist and willfully rude about the differently abled." Namrata Joshi of The Hindu wrote, "One can't quite go looking for political correctness in such a film. But Housefull3, doesn't know where it wants to stand on issues. No wonder after cracking many a joke at the physically challenged its attempt to redeem itself in the end seems half baked and forced. The film’s stand on racism is also just as confused. Initially Indians and the blacks are seen at the same end of the racial slurs yet you have the Gujju empire of Batook Patel populated entirely by black maids and distasteful references made to their wombs. And not to forget the play with maa and behen in the lyrics. What are these songs trying to say?"

Amongst positive reviews, Bollywood Hungama gave the film 3 out of 5, writing, "On the whole, HOUSEFULL 3 has all the constituents of an archetypal Hindi masala movie with hilarity, absurdity, humour, gags and punches in abundance. The film is a madcap entertainer which delivers guffaws, belly laughs and over-the-top slapstick humour in gigantic proportion. The film however is bound to get diverse reactions from the audiences. If you admire and relish these entertainers, and are passionate about cinema of this variety, then HOUSEFULL 3 is definitely a stress buster for you. Else, you can stay away from this."

=== Box office ===
The film grossed approximately ₹15.25 crore (US$1.6 million) in India and ₹13.36 crore (US$1.4 million) from overseas territories on its opening day. It grossed ₹16.30 crore (US$1.7 million) net in India on its second day. By the end of its opening weekend, the film had grossed approximately ₹100.03 crore (US$10 million) worldwide. The film's final domestic gross stands at ₹110 crore (US$11 million) and overseas gross stands at ₹85 crore (US$8.8 million), thus taking the total worldwide gross to ₹195 crore (US$20 million).

== Music ==
Housefull 3

Soundtrack album by Sohail Sen, Mika Singh, Shaarib-Toshi, Tanishk Bagchi
- Released: 10 May 2016
- Recorded: 2015–2016
- Genre: Feature film soundtrack
- Length: 15:50
- Language: Hindi
- Label: T-Series

The music for Housefull 3 is composed by Sohail Sen, Mika Singh, Shaarib-Toshi and Tanishk Bagchi while the lyrics were written by Sameer Sen, Farhad-Sajid, Sanjeev Chaturvedi, Mamta Sharma, Arafat Mehmood, Rani Malik, Manoj Yadav and Danish Sabri. The background score is given by Julius Packiam. The music rights are acquired by T-Series. The first song of the film "Pyar Ki" was released on 24 April 2016. The full music album was released on 10 May 2016.

Track listing
No.	Title	Lyrics	Music	Singer(s)	Length
1.	"Pyar Ki"	Manoj Yadav, Farhad-Sajid, Danish Sabri	Shaarib-Toshi	Shaarib-Toshi, Nakash Aziz, Divya Kumar, Anmol Malik, Earl Edgar	3:47
2.	"Taang Uthake"	Sameer Sen, Farhad-Sajid, Mamta Sharma, Sanjeev Chaturvedi	Sohail Sen	Sohail Sen, Mika Singh, Neeti Mohan, Mamta Sharma	4:10
3.	"Malamaal"	Rani Malik, Farhad-Sajid	Mika Singh, Millind Gaba	Mika Singh, Akira, Miss Pooja, Kuwar Virk	3:23
4.	"Fake Ishq"	Sajid-Farhad, Arafat Mehmood	Tanishk Bagchi	Kailash Kher, Nakash Aziz, Altamash Faridi	4:30
Total length:					15:50
