= Housefull 5 =

2025 Indian film by Tarun Mansukhani

- Theatrical release poster
- Directed by: Tarun Mansukhani
- Written by: Farhad Samji; Tarun Mansukhani
- Screenplay by: Sajid Nadiadwala
- Story by: Sajid Nadiadwala
- Produced by: Sajid Nadiadwala; Warda Nadiadwala; Firuzi Khan
- Starring: Akshay Kumar; Abhishek Bachchan; Riteish Deshmukh; Jacqueline Fernandez; Sonam Bajwa; Nargis Fakhri; Dino Morea; Sanjay Dutt; Jackie Shroff; Nana Patekar; Chitrangda Singh; Fardeen Khan; Chunky Panday; Johnny Lever; Shreyas Talpade; Ranjeet; Soundarya Sharma; Nikitin Dheer
- Cinematography: V. Manikandan
- Edited by: Rameshwar S. Bhagat
- Music by: Score: Julius Packiam; Songs: Yo Yo Honey Singh; White Noise Collectives; Tanishk Bagchi; Kratex; Shankar–Ehsaan–Loy; Sajid–Wajid; Julius Packiam
- Production company: Nadiadwala Grandson Entertainment
- Distributed by: Pen Marudhar
- Release date: 6 June 2025
- Running time: 165 minutes
- Country: India
- Language: Hindi
- Budget: ₹225 crore
- Box office: est. ₹242.8 crore

Housefull 5 is a 2025 Indian Hindi-language comedy thriller film co-written and directed by Tarun Mansukhani and produced by Sajid Nadiadwala, Warda Nadiadwala and Firuzi Khan under production banner Nadiadwala Grandson Entertainment. It marks the fifth instalment of the Housefull franchise.

The film features an ensemble cast including Akshay Kumar, Abhishek Bachchan, Riteish Deshmukh, Sanjay Dutt, Fardeen Khan, Shreyas Talpade, Nana Patekar, Jackie Shroff, Dino Morea, Jacqueline Fernandez, Nargis Fakhri, Chitrangada Singh, Sonam Bajwa, Soundarya Sharma, Chunky Pandey, Nikitin Dheer and Johnny Lever.

A murder mystery comedy, the film follows multiple imposters who claim to be the son of a recently deceased billionaire as they compete for his fortune while aboard a luxury cruise ship.

Released on 6 June 2025, the film features two distinct versions, each showcasing a different climax sequence: Housefull 5A and Housefull 5B. The film received negative reviews from the critics and had a commercially average run, grossing ₹242.80–₹248.80 crore at the box office. Despite this, it emerged as the eighth highest-grossing Hindi film of 2025.

== Plot ==
On his 100th birthday, billionaire tycoon Ranjeet Dobriyal hosts a lavish party aboard a luxury cruise ship with his son Dev, adopted son Shiraz, bodyguard Batuk, CFO Maya, COO Bedi, captain Sameer and other guests. Before departure, Ranjeet dies suddenly of a heart attack. Fearing his death will cause Ranjeet Group's stock to collapse, Dev and the board conceal it. Ranjeet's lawyer Lucy then activates his holographic will, revealing that his entire £69 billion fortune is bequeathed to his son Jolly, from his first marriage to Shakuntala Devi. The will identifies Jolly through several clues: he is left-handed, married to a foreigner, and has a distinctive scar on his butt.

The following day, three men—Jalabuddin, Jalbushan and Julius—arrive with their respective wives, Zara, Sasikala and Kaanchi, each claiming to be Jolly and producing identical proof. Dev proposes a DNA test, with results due the next morning. During a wild party that night, the ship's clown, Aakhri Pasta, attempts to drug Batuk by spiking his drink, but the drug is accidentally mixed into the communal punch, incapacitating everyone.

The next morning, the three men find themselves in the wrong cabins with the wrong wives and no memory of the night before. Matters worsen when the doctor due to perform the DNA test is found murdered. Dev has the three men and their wives imprisoned until Interpol arrives. There, the men admit they are all impostors and that none of the women are their actual wives. Julius is a private detective hired by Ranjeet to find the real Jolly, but decided to pose as him; Jalabuddin and Jalbushan independently discovered the scheme after unknowingly hiring each other's girlfriends. Kaanchi is actually Jalabuddin's partner, Zara belongs to Jalbushan, and Sasikala to Julius.

The men escape by stealing Batuk's keys while he sleeps. They attempt to dispose of Ranjeet's body, while the women crawl through air vents to destroy DNA evidence. In the laboratory, now a morgue, the women see Bedi behaving suspiciously: he searches the dead doctor's pockets, wipes his fingerprints from door handles and hurriedly leaves. Believing him to be the killer, they secretly record him. Meanwhile, the men hide Ranjeet's body in a wardrobe, only for it to be accidentally replaced by Bedi's corpse, which has been shot in the head.

Two suspended London police officers, Baba and Bhiddu, arrive hoping to solve the murders and regain their positions. They uncover clues pointing towards the killer, but Sameer is murdered before they can act, and they are blamed and imprisoned. Their former boss, Interpol officer Daghdu, arrives, shares the investigation files with the suspects and promises to expose the killer the following day. That night, a masked assailant enters Daghdu's cabin to stab him, but strikes a decoy instead. Daghdu and Julius emerge from hiding and confront the attacker.

The film features two alternate endings revealing different killers:

Housefull 5A Ending: The attacker is revealed as Dev, who initially claims innocence. A second masked figure then stabs Dev and escapes, exposing the truth: Dev staged the attack as part of his scheme. While Daghdu fights Dev, Julius and the others, along with Baba and Bhiddu, pursue the second killer to the engine room, where Jalbushan is unmasked. Jalbushan and Dev had joined forces to orchestrate the inheritance fraud. The doctor was killed after witnessing Dev swap the DNA samples; Bedi was killed after discovering evidence on the doctor's body and confronting Dev; and Sameer was murdered because he had witnessed the crime.

Housefull 5B Ending: Jalbushan is still caught, but the true mastermind is Maya, the cunning CFO. Driven by gambling debts, she orchestrated the murders to obtain Ranjeet's fortune.

As chaos erupts in the engine room, the real Jolly, Jalal, finally arrives. He reveals that he does not need his father's fortune because he already possesses a £169 billion fortune, and offers to divide the £69 billion inheritance among those present. The film ends with Julius marrying Sasikala, Jalabuddin marrying Kaanchi, Dev/Maya and Jalbushan being arrested, Zara marrying Jalal, and Baba and Bhiddu being reinstated as police officers by Daghdu.

== Cast ==
- Akshay Kumar as Julius (Jolly 3)
- Abhishek Bachchan as Jalbhushan (Jolly 2)
- Riteish Deshmukh as Jalabuddin (Jolly 1)
- Jacqueline Fernandez as Sasikala
- Sonam Bajwa as Zara Akhtar
- Nargis Fakhri as Kaanchi
- Dino Morea as Bedi
- Soundarya Sharma as Advocate Lucy
- Sanjay Dutt as Chief inspector Bhidu
- Jackie Shroff as Chief inspector Baba
- Nana Patekar as Superintendent Dhagdu Hulgund
- Chitrangda Singh as Maya
- Fardeen Khan as Dev Dobriyal
- Chunky Panday as Aakhri Pasta
- Johnny Lever as Batuk Patel
- Shreyas Talpade as Shiraz Shabuddin Siliguriwale
- Ranjeet as Ranjeet Dobriyal
- Nikitin Dheer as Captain Sameer
- Akashdeep Sabir as Dr. Aman Joshi
- Bobby Deol as Jalal Dobriyal (cameo appearance)
- Archana Puran Singh as Shakuntala Devi (photo only)
- Mithun Chakraborty as Jaggu Baba (photo only)

== Production ==
The film was announced on 30 June 2023 by Akshay Kumar. The cast was confirmed in early September 2024. Filming began in September 2024 and wrapped up in December 2024. "The cast filmed on a cruise ship for 40 days, sailing from Newcastle to Spain, Normandy, Honfleur, and back to Plymouth. Additional reports confirmed that the cruise ship filming schedule added a unique production element, with elaborate action and dance sequences shot at sea. The film was shot in multiple international locations and was one of the most expensive instalments in the franchise.

== Soundtrack ==
Housefull 5

Soundtrack album by Yo Yo Honey Singh, White Noise Collectives, Tanishk Bagchi, Kratex, Shankar–Ehsaan–Loy, Sajid–Wajid and Julius Packiam
- Released: 6 June 2025
- Recorded: 2024–2025
- Genre: Feature film soundtrack
- Length: 15:20
- Language: Hindi
- Label: T-Series
External audio
- Housefull 5 - Full Album on YouTube

The film's soundtrack is composed by Yo Yo Honey Singh, White Noise Collectives, Tanishk Bagchi, Kratex, Shankar–Ehsaan–Loy, Sajid–Wajid and Julius Packiam while the background score is composed by Julius Packiam.

The first single titled "Laal Pari" was released on 3 May 2025. The second single titled "Dil E Nadaan" was released on 15 May 2025. The third single titled "Qayamat" was released on 24 May 2025. The fourth single titled "The Phoogdi Dance" was released on 31 May 2025.

Track listing
No.	Title	Lyrics	Music	Singer(S)	Length
1.	"Laal Pari"	Yo Yo Honey Singh, Alfaaz	Yo Yo Honey Singh	Yo Yo Honey Singh, Simar Kaur	4:16
2.	"Dil-E-Nadaan"	Kumaar	White Noise Collectives	Madhubanti Bagchi, Sumonto Mukherjee	3:28
3.	"Qayamat"	SOM	White Noise Collectives	Neeraj Shridhar, Shruti Dhasmana	2:44
4.	"The Phoogdi Dance"	Kratex, Patya The Doc	Tanishk Bagchi, Kratex	Kratex, Patya The Doc	2:12
5.	"Housefull 5 Mixtape"	Amitabh Bhattacharya, Sameer Anjaan	Shankar–Ehsaan–Loy, Sajid–Wajid, Julius Packiam	Ritu Pathak, Neeraj Shridhar, Alyssa Mendonsa, Tarun Sagar, Loy Mendonsa, Wajid Khan, Sunidhi Chauhan, Suzanne D'Mello	2:40
Total length:					15:20

== Marketing ==
On 1 June 2025, a promotional event was held at Season mall in Pune.

The event attracted a massive crowd, with fans cheering for the cast and participating in fun games and dance performances. A viral video from the event showed Akshay Kumar dancing fugdi with Nana Patekar, adding a regional touch to the promotion. The Pune promotion marked the beginning of a multi-city tour ahead of the film's theatrical release.

== Release ==
=== Theatrical ===
Earlier set to release on Diwali 2024, the film was postponed and was later released worldwide on 6 June 2025.

The film was released in two versions, titled Housefull 5A and Housefull 5B, each featuring a different climax and murderer. This dual-ending format was conceived by Nadiadwala, who has envisioned the concept for 30 years. Both versions received U/A certification from the Central Board of Film Certification after certain edits were made to scenes and dialogues.

=== Home media ===
The film began streaming on Amazon Prime Video from 1 August 2025.

== Controversies ==
=== Objectification of women ===
The film faced criticism for its objectification of women. Responding to the criticism, Mansukhani said the film was "driven by women" and argued that calling it sexist was a biased view.

=== "Laal Pari" copyright claim ===
The film's teaser was released on the occasion of 15th anniversary of the franchise. Later, on 9 May 2025, the film's teaser was unexpectedly removed from YouTube due to a copyright claim by Mofusion Studios over the song "Laal Pari", disrupting the promotional campaign. Producer Sajid Nadiadwala subsequently presented a written declaration from Yo Yo Honey Singh confirming his exclusive rights to the track and issued a legal notice, leading to the teaser's reinstatement on the platform shortly thereafter.

== Reception ==
=== Critical response ===
Housefull 5 received negative reviews from critics. The film faced criticism over its maltreatment and sexual objectification of the lead actresses' characters, screenplay, story, direction, multi-ending formats, humor, and performances. On the review aggregator website Rotten Tomatoes, 13% of 15 critics' reviews are positive, with an average rating of 4/10.

Bollywood Hungama gave the film 3.5 out of 5, writing, "The movie is a paisa-vasool killer comedy that works due to the performances of the lead cast, subject, humour quotient, unpredictable climax, franchise value and unabashed madness. Akshay Kumar shines with his humour and charisma, supported well by Riteish Deshmukh. Dino Morea and Fardeen Khan make a strong impression in supporting roles. Abhishek Bachchan is decent but overshadowed. The female leads add glamour, while Sanjay Dutt and Jackie Shroff are let down by weak writing. Nana Patekar stands out in a brief appearance, while Shreyas Talpade is underused."

Risabh Suri of the Hindustan Times rated the film 3 out of 5 stars and highlighted "The film struggles to maintain energy, relying too heavily on Akshay's charm rather than strong material. Overall, Housefull 5 feels like being stuck on a cruise with a few comic veterans, and a funny script that forgot to board the ship." Lachmi Deb Roy of Firstpost rated the film 2.5 out of 5 stars and opined "Housefull 5 is a bit of an overstretch and sometimes you can find it mindless too, but with Abhishek Bachchan’s stunning performance and Chitrangada Singh’s swag, I promise you will have a ‘jolly’ good time. And how can we forget Nana Patekar who adds a dash of thrill to this film."

Renuka Vyavahare of The Times of India rated the film 2.5 out of 5 stars and wrote "What surprises you is the utter lack of humour, even dirty humour, if we may say so in the script and sheer wastage of a zillion actors who are known for their comic timing." Devesh Sharma of the Filmfare rated the film 2.5 out of 5 stars and opined "Housefull 5 is an over-the-top comedy set on a cruise. It relies on a set of physical gags to get in the laughs."

Jaya Dwivedie of India TV rated the film 2.5 out of 5 and wrote "Housefull 5 starts with a good idea and makes the audience laugh a lot in the first half but loses its shine as it moves towards the interval. The excitement created in the first half about the murder mystery does not last till the end; the focus is lost, but the effective climax will not let your money go to waste." Vineeta Kumar of India Today rated the film 2 out of 5 stars and wrote "In the Akshay Kumar-starrer, the real comedian, Johnny Lever, takes a backseat while the cruise sails full speed ahead in a tide of obscene jokes and crass humour. If this is what Bollywood thinks comedy is, we might need a national sense of humour check."

Saibal Chatterjee of NDTV rated the film 1.5 out of 5 stars, saying, "The film is madcap all right but its pull-no-punches and respect-no-limits humour works against its own well-being. If only Housefull 5 wasn't so full of unalloyed bilge, it would not have come across as the kind of unbridled celebration of the ludicrous that it does." Shubhra Gupta of The Indian Express rated the film 1 out of 5 stars and opined "Compared to the previous Housefulls, this one has a slightly fuller house, but because no one expects anything else, it’s pretty much like the older ones."

Anuj Kumar of The Hindu reviewed the film and summarised "Sporadically funny and unapologetically corny, Sajid Nadiadwala’s fifth instalment of the franchise flirts with disaster. As always, the film is high on the glamour quotient, creating some thinly veiled sexual humour. The strand of suspense thriller is more potent, but the comic element does not serve it effectively." Rahul Desai of The Hollywood Reporter India criticised the film for turning itself into a male gaze. He summarises "Not even Akshay Kumar’s comic timing and a twin-ending gimmick can rescue 'Housefull 5' from itself."

=== Box office ===
Housefull 5 earned ₹24.35 crore at the domestic box office on its opening day, followed by ₹91.83 crore over its opening weekend, and ₹133.58 crore in its first week. As of 7 July 2025, the film has grossed ₹191.63 crore in India and ₹51.47 crore in overseas markets, for a worldwide total of ₹242.80 crore.

According to Box Office India, Housefull 5 received an average verdict at the box office.
