= Farhad Samji =

Indian filmmaker (born 1975)

- Born: 5 May 1975 (age 51); Mumbai, India
- Occupations: Film director; writer; lyricist; actor; singer; music director
- Years active: 1987–present
- Spouse: married
- Children: 2
- Relatives: Sajid Samji (brother)

Farhad Samji (born 5 May 1975) is an Indian writer, singer, lyricist, actor, music and film director who works in Hindi cinema. He is known for directing Housefull 4, Bachchhan Paandey, and Kisi Ka Bhai Kisi Ki Jaan independently. He has also made special appearances in films like Baaghi 3 and Coolie No. 1. He is famous for his works with his brother, Sajid Samji. The duo together is known as Sajid-Farhad and are known for directing films like Entertainment and Housefull 3.

== Career ==
Farhad started his career with his brother Sajid, in 2002, as lyricists. They started writing dialogues for movies, starting with Shiva in 2006, and followed by numerous collaborations as writers for the Golmaal series, Sunday, Himmatwala, Bol Bachchan, and Singham series, with their last collaboration being Simmba in 2018. In 2019, apart from writing dialogues for Punjabi film Singham, he directed the web series Booo Sabki Phategi and the action comedy movie Housefull 4 (starring Akshay Kumar and produced by Sajid Nadiadwala, which became the highest-grossing film of the Housefull franchise generating ₹280 crores of revenue at the box office, despite critically negative reviews.

Samji continued to write dialogues for the 2020 films Street Dancer 3D, Baaghi 3 and Coolie No. 1. He released his next directorial, the Akshay Kumar and Kriti Sanon 2021 starrer Bachchan Pandey, in March 2022, whose shooting took place from January to March 2021. Samji also made the social family comedy Kisi Ka Bhai Kisi Ki Jaan starring Salman Khan and Pooja Hegde, which released in 2023.

== Filmography ==
=== As director ===
Year	Title	Notes	Ref.
2014	Entertainment	Directed with Sajid	
2016	Housefull 3	Directed with Sajid	
2018	Baby Come Naa	Web series	
2019	Booo Sabki Phategi	Web series	
2019	Housefull 4	Director and Writer	
2022	Bachchhan Paandey	Remake of Jigarthanda	
2023	Pop Kaun?	Web Series	
2023	Kisi Ka Bhai Kisi Ki Jaan	Remake of Veeram; co-written with Sparsh Khetarpal, Tasha Bhambra	

=== As writer ===
Year	Title	Notes
2011	Singham	Dialogues
2020	Baaghi 3	Screenplay & Dialogues
2020	Street Dancer 3D	Dialogues
2020	Laxmii	Adapted Screenplay & Dialogues
2020	Coolie No. 1	Dialogues
2021	Sooryavanshi	Dialogues
2022	Bhool Bhulaiyaa 2	Dialogues
2022	Bachchhan Pandey	Dialogues
2025	Housefull 5	Dialogues, co-wrote with Tarun Mansukhani
2026	Hai Jawani Toh Ishq Hona Hai	Dialogues
2026	Welcome to the Jungle	Dialogues

=== As actor ===
Year	Title	Role
2020	Baaghi 3	a man in gents toilet
2023	Kisi Ka Bhai Kisi Ki Jaan	the Photographer in a wedding

Year	Web Series	Role
2023	Pop Kaun?	Balwan Trivedi

=== As lyricist ===
Year	Title	Song	Notes
2019	Prassthanam	"Prassthanam Title Track"	also music director
2020	Laxmii	"Mata Ka Jagrata"	also singer
2020	Coolie No. 1	"Coolie No. 1 Title Track"	

=== As singer ===
Year	Title	Song	Notes
2019	Housefull 4	"The Bhoot Song"	also co-music director
2020	Laxmii	"Mata Ka Jagrata"	also lyricist
2023	Pop Kaun?	"All Songs"	also lyricist

=== As music composer ===
Year	Title	Song	Notes
2019	Housefull 4	"The Bhoot Song"	composer along with Sandeep Shirodkar; also singer along with Mika Singh and lyricist
2019	Prassthanam	"Prassthanam Title Track"	Also lyricist
2023	Pop Kaun?	"All Songs"	Also lyricist

== Works with Sajid ==
=== As lyricist ===
Year	Film	Songs
2002	Hum Kisise Kum Nahin	
2002	Chor Machaaye Shor	
2006	Keerthi Chakra	"Khuda Se Mannat"
2008	Sunday	
2008	God Tussi Great Ho	
2012	Bol Bachchan	"Bol Bachchan"
2016	Housefull 3	

=== As writer ===
Year	Film	Director	Notes
2006	Shiva	Ram Gopal Varma	dialogues
2007	Ram Gopal Varma Ki Aag	Ram Gopal Varma	dialogues
2008	Sunday	Rohit Shetty	Screenplay, dialogues
2008	Golmaal Returns	Rohit Shetty	dialogues
2009	All the Best: Fun Begins	Rohit Shetty	dialogues
2010	Golmaal 3	Rohit Shetty	dialogues
2011	Ready	Anees Bazmee	dialogues
2011	Double Dhamaal	Indra Kumar	dialogues
2011	Singham	Rohit Shetty	dialogues
2012	Housefull 2	Sajid Khan	dialogues
2012	Bol Bachchan	Rohit Shetty	dialogues
2013	Himmatwala	Sajid Khan	dialogues
2013	Chashme Baddoor	David Dhawan	dialogues
2013	Policegiri	K.S. Ravikumar	dialogues
2013	Chennai Express	Rohit Shetty	dialogues
2013	Boss	Anthony D'Souza	dialogues
2014	Entertainment	Sajid-Farhad	Screenplay, dialogues
2014	Singham Returns	Rohit Shetty	dialogues
2015	Dilwale	Rohit Shetty	dialogues
2016	Housefull 3	Sajid-Farhad	screenplay, dialogues
2017	Judwaa 2	David Dhawan	dialogues
2017	Golmaal Again	Rohit Shetty	dialogues
2018	Simmba	Rohit Shetty	Additional screenplay written by Sajid Samji while dialogues were written by Farhad Samji

== Awards and nominations ==
- Nominated for Producers Guild Film Awards for Writing Dialogue for the film Singham
