= Booo Sabki Phategi =

2019 television series by Ekta Kapoor

- Teaser poster
- Genre: Horror comedy
- Created by: Paritosh Painter
- Developed by: Ekta Kapoor
- Screenplay by: Farhad Samji; Tasha Bhambra; Sparsh Khetrapal
- Story by: Paritosh Painter
- Directed by: Farhad Samji
- Creative director: Manjit Sachdev - ALT Balaji
- Starring: Tusshar Kapoor; Krushna Abhishek; Mallika Sherawat
- Theme music composer: Farhad Samji
- Composer: Souvyk Chakraborty
- Country of origin: India
- Original language: Hindi
- No. of seasons: 1
- No. of episodes: 8

Production
- Producer: Paritosh Painter
- Cinematography: Manoj Soni
- Editor: Sanjay Jaiswal
- Camera setup: Multi-camera
- Running time: 15-23 minutes
- Production company: Ideas The Entertainment Company

Original release
- Network: ALT Balaji
- Release: 27 June 2019

Booo Sabki Phategi is a 2019 Hindi-language horror comedy series created and produced by Ekta Kapoor for video on demand platform ALTBalaji. The series is available for streaming on the ALT Balaji app and its associated websites from 27 June.

== Premise ==
The story revolves around Manav (played by Tusshar Kapoor) and his friends who gather at an isolated resort. Members of the group start turning up dead and turn into zombies. Manav who looks innocent but has a mysterious side. Haseena(played by Mallika Sherawat) is a mysterious walking ghost trying to communicate with them.

== Cast ==
=== Main ===
- Tusshar Kapoor as Manav
- Mallika Sherawat as Haseena
- Krushna Abhishek as Vishwas
- Sanjay Mishra as Nainsukh
- Kiku Sharda as Puchki
- Vipul Roy as Veer
- Shefali Zariwala as Khushi
- Sakshi Pradhan as Zara
- Shweta Gulati as Ruchi
- Saba Saudagar as Shalu
- Anil Charanjeet as Sartaj
- Ashwini Kalsekar as Amma

=== Episodic appearance ===
- Tasha Bhambra as Doctor Daruwala

== Episodes ==
No.	Title	Directed by	Written by	Original release date
1	"Kaun bachega? 'Nun' of us"	Farhad Samji	Tasha Bhambra	June 27, 2019
2	"Zombie Jaisi Yeh Chaal, Chudailo..."	Farhad Samji	Farhad Samji	June 27, 2019
3	"Logic Nahi Sirf Magic"	Farhad Samji	Farhad Samji	June 27, 2019
4	"Yahan Dost Kaun aur Ghost Kaun ?"	Farhad Samji	Farhad Samji	June 27, 2019
5	"Ek Haseena Thi Ek Deewana Tha"	Farhad Samji	Farhad Samji	June 27, 2019
6	"Haste Haste Lag Gaya Raste"	Farhad Samji	Farhad Samji	June 27, 2019
7	"Main Peeth Hu - I Am Back Bey"	Farhad Samji	Farhad Samji	June 27, 2019
8	"Apna Time Gaya"	Farhad Samji	Farhad Samji	June 27, 2019

== Production ==
The series was announced in the first week of February 2019 with Farhad Samji as director. It stars Mallika Sherawat, Tusshar Kapoor, Kiku Sharda, Sanjay Mishra, and Krushna Abhishek.

== Promotion ==
The official trailer of the series was launched on 17 June 2019 by ALTBalaji. It garnered over 7.3 million views since its release on YouTube.
