= Sajid-Farhad =

Indian filmmaker duo

Sajid-Farhad is an Indian film director and writer duo consisting of brothers Sajid Samji and Farhad Samji. Their work as writers include the films Shiva, Sunday, Double Dhamaal, Golmaal Returns, All The Best: Fun Begins, Housefull 2, Ready, Golmaal 3, Singham, Bol Bachchan, Chashme Baddoor, Himmatwala, Chennai Express, Entertainment and Singham Returns. Five of the films they have written have entered the Bollywood 100 crore club. In 2014, they started directing films with Entertainment.

== Career ==
The brothers were born in an Aga Khani (Khoja) Nizari Ismaili family.

The duo started their career as lyricists. David Dhawan roped them in for the film Hum Kisise Kum Nahin (2002). Sajid-Farhad first tasted success as lyricists with the song "M Bole Toh" from Munnabhai MBBS (2004). After that they got an offer from Ram Gopal Varma for Shiva (2006) and thereafter they penned dialogues for Rohit Shetty's Sunday (2008) and Golmaal Returns (2008).

The duo made their directorial debut with Entertainment, a slapstick comedy film starring Akshay Kumar and Tamannaah Bhatia. The film was released on 8 August 2014. Their next film Housefull 3 starring Akshay Kumar, Lisa Haydon and Nargis Fakhri was released on 3 June 2016.

In 2018, Farhad wrote and directed a comedy web-series, Baby Come Naa for Ekta Kapoor's OTT platform ALT Balaji starring Shreyas Talpade, Chunky Pandey, Kiku Sharda, Shefali Zariwala and Manasi Scott.

== Filmography ==
=== Lyricist ===
Year	Film	Songs
2002	Hum Kisise Kum Nahin	
2002	Chor Machaaye Shor	
2006	Keerthi Chakra	Malayalam film Khuda Se Mannat
2008	Sunday	
2008	God Tussi Great Ho	
2010	Toofan	
2012	Bol Bachchan	Bol Bachchan
2016	Housefull 3	

=== Writers ===
Year	Film	Director
2006	Shiva	Ram Gopal Varma
2007	Aag	Ram Gopal Varma
2008	Sunday	Rohit Shetty
2008	Golmaal Returns	Rohit Shetty
2009	All the Best: Fun Begins	Rohit Shetty
2010	Golmaal 3	Rohit Shetty
2010	Toofan	Major Ravi
2011	Ready	Anees Bazmee
2011	Double Dhamaal	Indra Kumar
2011	Singham	Rohit Shetty
2012	Housefull 2	Sajid Khan
2012	Bol Bachchan	Rohit Shetty
2013	Himmatwala	Sajid Khan
2013	Chashme Baddoor	David Dhawan
2013	Policegiri	K.S. Ravikumar
2013	Chennai Express	Rohit Shetty
2013	Boss	Anthony D'Souza
2014	Entertainment	Sajid-Farhad
2014	Singham Returns	Rohit Shetty
2015	Dilwale	Rohit Shetty
2016	Housefull 3	Sajid-Farhad
2017	Judwaa 2	David Dhawan
2017	Golmaal Again	Rohit Shetty
2018	Simmba	Rohit Shetty

=== Directors ===
Year	Film	Notes
2014	Entertainment	
2016	Housefull 3	
