= The Defective Detective =

The Defective Detectives is a 2023 Indian Marathi-language comedy film directed by Paritosh Painter.

The Defective Detective may also refer to:

- The Defective Detective (1984 film), a 1984 French comedy film directed by Michel Gerard
- The Defective Detective (upcoming film), an upcoming American comedy film by Terry Gilliam
