= DJ Khushi =

Indian DJ

DJ Khushi is a disc jockey in India and has been awarded the Most Popular Bollywood DJ award. Because of his frequent appearances, Khushi is also known as the official DJ of Shahrukh Khan. He was the opening DJ during Tiesto's Delhi Gig. In 2016, he headlined the Sunburn Music Festival with Hardwell, the world's No.1 DJ. In Dec'16, Ellie Goulding and Nervo performed alongside DJ Khushi. Khushi has also performed with LMFAO, Edward Maya and Akcent.

He has collaborated with big banner projects and created official remixes for Bollywood films. In 2020, he made his debut as a composer and singer in Bollywood with the song "Burjkhalifa" from Laxmii starring Akshay Kumar and Kiara Advani. The song was penned by Gagan Ahuja, composed by himself along with Shashi and sung by Shashi Suman along with Nikhita Gandhi.

== Projects ==
BOLLYWOOD

- Chammak Challo - Sung by Akon, Mahalakshmi Iyer (Ra.One)
- Ae Dil Hai Mushkil Title Track - Sung by Arijit Singh
- Soch Na Sake - Sung by Arijit Singh (Airlift)
- Chittiyaan Kalaiyaan - Sung by Kanika Kapoor, Meet Bros (Roy)
- Daayre - Sung by Arijit Singh (Dilwale)
- Boss Title Track - Sung by Ajjan of Meet Bros, Yo Yo Honey Singh
- Nachaange Saari Raat - Sung by Neeraj Shridhar, Tulsi Kumar (Junooniyat)
- Chahun Main Ya Na - Sung by Arijit Singh, Palak Muchhal (Aashiqui 2)
- Anarkali Disco Chali - Sung by Mamta Sharma, Sukhwinder Singh (Housefull 2)
- Right Now Now - Sung by Wajid Khan, Sunidhi Chauhan, Suzanne D'Mello (Housefull 2)
- Hasi (Female Version) - Sung by Shreya Ghoshal (Hamari Adhuri Kahani)
- DJ Waley Babu - Sung by Badshah
- Jeena Jeena - Sung by Atif Aslam (Badlapur)
- Desi Look - Sung by Kanika Kapoor (Ek Paheli Leela)
- Meherbani - Sung by Jubin Nautiyal (The Shaukeens)
- Pyaar Mein Dil Pe Maar De Goli - Sung by Bappi Lahiri, Kishore Kumar, Asha Bhosle (Tamanchey)
- Chikni Chameli - Sung by Shreya Ghoshal (Agneepath)
- Ek Tha Deewana - Sung by Vijay Prakash, Suzanne D'Mello, Blaaze (Vinnaithaandi Varuvaayaa)
- Jhak Maar Ke - Sung by Neeraj Shridhar, Harshdeep Kaur (Desi Boyz)
- Tum Mile Title Track - Sung by Neeraj Shridhar
- Mrs. Khanna - Sung by Shaan, Sunidhi Chauhan, Bappi Lahiri, Suzanne D'Mello, Neuman Pinto (Main Aurr Mrs Khanna)
- Kaminey Title Track - Sung by Vishal Bhardwaj
- De Dana Dan Title Track - Sung by Ad Boys
- Burjkhalifa - Sung by DJ Khushi, Shashi Suman, Nikhita Gandhi (Laxmii)

INTERNATIONAL

- Get Down - Pacha Recordings
- Home - Stoney Boy Music (Armada Music)
- Sublime - Lohit
- Unleashed - Outta Limits
- Let's Party All Night - Housesession Records
