= Saba Saudagar =

Indian film and television actress

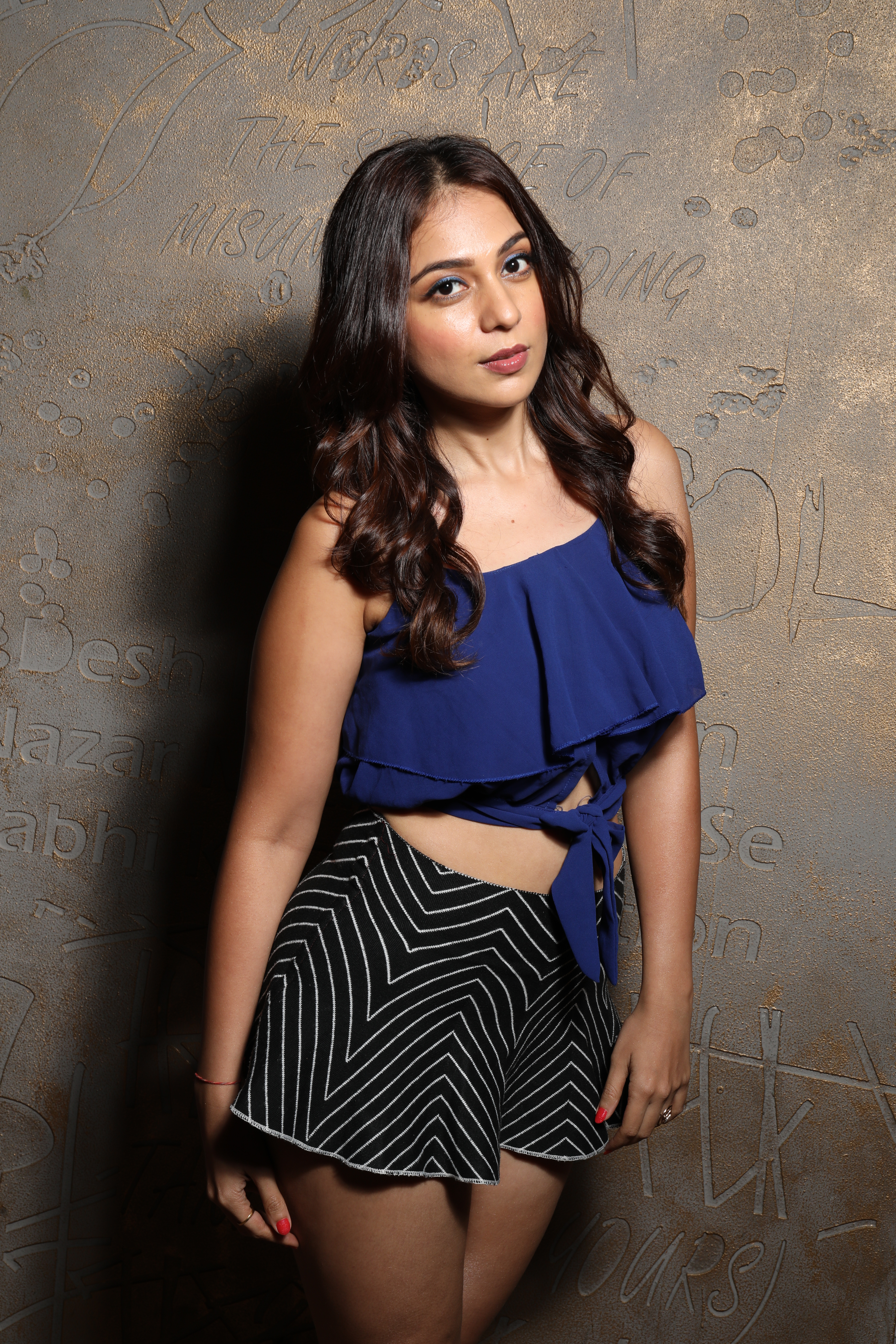
- Saba Saudagar in 2019
- Occupation: Actress
- Website: thesabasaudagar.com

Saba Saudagar is an Indian film and television actress. She is known for her roles in Hindi-language web-series including Booo Sabki Phategi (2019), Crackdown (2020), and Gandii Baat (season 4) (2020).

== Career ==
Saba played one of the lead roles in the 2018 Indian film The Reunion. She rose to prominence with her role in the 2019 web-series Booo Sabki Phategi. She appeared in a pivotal role in Apoorva Lakhia's spy thriller web series Crackdown (2020), in which she acted as Fawzia. Her role was well received by audiences.

== Filmography ==
- The Reunion (2018)
- Booo Sabki Phategi (2019)
- Crackdown (2020)
- Gandii Baat (Season 4) (2020)
