= Pop Kaun? =

2023 Indian television series

- Genre: Comedy drama
- Created by: Farhad Samji
- Written by: Tasha Bhambhra; Sparsh Khetarpal; Farhad Samji
- Directed by: Farhad Samji
- Starring: Kunal Khemu; Saurabh Shukla; Johny Lever; Rajpal Yadav; Nupur Sanon; Ashwini Kalsekar; Farhad Samji
- Theme music composer: Sanjoy Chowdhury
- Composer: Farhad Samji
- Country of origin: India
- Original language: Hindi
- No. of seasons: 1
- No. of episodes: 6

Production
- Executive producers: Gaurav Banerjee; Varun Malik; Mahesh Menon; Manoj Mitra
- Producers: Zukhruf Samji; Farhad Samji
- Editor: Kamlesh Parui
- Running time: 30-40 minutes
- Production company: Yam Productions

Original release
- Network: Disney+ Hotstar
- Release: 17 March 2023

Pop Kaun? is a 2023 Indian comedy-drama television series directed by Farhad Samji, produced by Yam Productions and distributed by Disney+ Hotstar. The series stars Kunal Khemu, Saurabh Shukla, Johny Lever, Rajpal Yadav, Ashwini Kalsekar, Chunky Pandey, Jamie Lever, Satish Kaushik, Farhad Samji, Zakir Hussain, Nupur Sanon and Tasha Bhambra.

== Plot ==
The series revolves around the life of Sahil, son of Brij Kishore Trivedi, who is in love with a gangster's daughter Pihu. The storyline evolves around their journey on finding the biological father of Sahil.

== Cast ==
- Kunal Khemu as Sahil Trivedi / Sadiq Qureshi / Sukhwinder Singh (Sukhi) / Sandy Comsalves / Sahil Chaupala
- Saurabh Shukla as Karamjeet Biswajeet Chaupala "KBC", Pihu's adoptive father and Sahil's biological father
- Rajpal Yadav as Sultan Qureshi / Taufeeq Qureshi (Double role)
- Ashwini Kalsekar as Satwant Kaur (Satty), Sahil's biological mother
- Johnny Lever as Brij Kishore Trivedi, Sahil's adoptive father
- Chunky Panday as Anthony Comsalves, Satwant's lover
- Satish Kaushik as Dr. Kartar Singh, Satwant's husband
- Nupur Sanon as Pihu Chaupala, Sahil's love interest
- Farhad Samji as Balwan Trivedi, Sahil's adoptive brother
- Jamie Lever as Rani
- Zakir Hussain as Mallik, Trivedi's rival
- Tasha Bhambra as Chandu
- Tusshar Kapoor as Basheer Barbola
- Prithvi Zutshi as Biswajeet Chaupala, KBC's father, Sahil's biological grandfather and Pihu's adoptive grandfather

== Release ==
Pop Kaun was released on 17 March 2023 on Disney+ Hotstar, 8 days after the death of actor Satish Kaushik.

== Soundtrack ==
Pop Kaun?

Soundtrack album by Farhad Samji
- Released: 17 March 2023 (Film)
- Recorded: 2023
- Genre: Feature Film soundtrack
- Language: Hindi
- Label: Sangeet Music

Farhad Samji chronology
Housefull 4 (2019)	Pop Kaun? (2023)	Kisi Ka Bhai Kisi Ki Jaan (2023)

All tracks are written by Farhad Samji.

Track-List
No.	Title	Singer(s)	Length
1.	"Pop Kaun Song"	Farhad Samji, Brijesh Shandilya, Sharvi Yadav	1:00
2.	"Zindagi Ne Teri Thoki"	Farhad Samji	1:29
3.	"Pata Bata De"	Farhad Samji, Sharvi Yadav	1:40
Total length:			4:09

== Reception ==
Vijayalakshmi Narayanan of The Free Press Journal wrote "At the hands of a better writer/director, the premise of promoting religious tolerance through a comedy of errors has tremendous potential. But, when you get the most seasoned actors in the business who have spent lifetimes in entertaining us, you owe everyone a collective apology for wasting their time."

Reviewing for The Indian Express, Sana Farzeen wrote "Not giving any spoilers, but the climax is quite predictable as you figure out where the story is heading. Leave aside a few moments, most of the show is quite forgettable."

Archika Khurana of The Times of India rated the series 2 stars out of 5 and wrote "Kunal Kemmu, who plays the lead, gives an earnest performance but fails to leave an indelible impression. Nupur Sanon (Kriti Sanon's sister) looks promising in her OTT debut, but she is overshadowed by these legendary actors."

Chirag Sehgal of News18 wrote "What has worked wonders for the show is its cast. Kunal Kemmu is brilliant at his job. He has done his role with utmost perfection. He looks very natural in whatever he does."

English Jagran wrote "Farhad Samji, along with his long-time collaborators Tasha Bhambra and Sparsh Khetarpal, wrote the show, and it seems that almost every other line in the series is a recycled SMS forward that would have annoyed people back in 2013. It's now 2023, and the humour is outdated."
