= Crackdown (TV series) =

2020 Indian Action Thriller series

- Created by: Apoorva Lakhia
- Written by: Chintan Gandhi; Suresh Nair
- Starring: Saqib Saleem; Iqbal Khan; Ankur Bhatia; Shriya Pilgaonkar; Rajesh Tailang
- Composer: Amar Mohile
- Country of origin: India
- No. of seasons: 2
- No. of episodes: 16

Production
- Executive producer: Sameer A. Shaikh
- Production location: India
- Cinematography: Fasahat Khan
- Editor: Steven H. Bernard
- Running time: 30-35 minutes

Original release
- Network: Voot (season 1); JioCinema (season 2)
- Release: 23 September 2020 – 31 May 2023

Crackdown is an Indian spy thriller webseries directed By Apoorva Lakhia starring Saqib Saleem in the lead role. All episodes premiered on Voot on 23 September 2020. The second season released on 25 May 2023 on JioCinema.

== Plot ==
The plot revolves around the life of a few Research and Analysis Wing (RAW) agents. RP, the top agent along with other agents plans to uncover a conspiracy that threatens the safety of India. They use one lady, Divya who is identical to Mariam who was the lover of one Militant Zaheed.

== Cast ==
- Saqib Saleem as Riyaz Pathan "RP"
- Shriya Pilgaonkar as Divya Shirodkar / Mariam: RP's teammate
- Iqbal Khan as Zorawar Kalra: Garima's husband and RP's teammate
- Ankur Bhatia as Tariq, ISI Agent
- Rajesh Tailang as Ashwini Rao, RAW Chief (Season 1)
- Sonali Kulkarni as Avantika Shroff, RAW Chief (Season 2)
- Waluscha De Sousa as Garima Kalra, Zorawar's wife/ Mausam Masoud, ISI Agent
- Freddy Daruwala as Terrorist Abu Khalil/Mateen (Season 2)
- Ekavali Khanna as Seema, Ashwini's wife (Season 1)
- Saba Saudagar as Fawzia, ISI Agent
- Tauqeer Alam Khan as Rajesh, RP's teammate (Season 1)
- Tanya Desai as Ananya, Rajesh's wife (Season 1)
- Palak Jaiswal as Lekha, Ashwini's daughter (Season 1)
- Vipin Bhardwaj as Bala (Season 1)
- Mudasir Bhat as Kabir (Season 1)
- Harry Parmar as Narang (Season 1)
- Ram Menon as Max
- Gauahar Khan as Kader Kazi (Season 1)
- Ajay Choudhary as Hamid
- Amal Sherawat as Terrorist (Police) (Season 1)
- Rohtas Nain as Mohammad (Season 1)
- Shreyas Zutchi as Ilham Brother 1 (Season 1)
- Akshun Vashisht as Ilham Brother 2 (Season 1)
- Arry Dabbas as Mr. Chopra, Mrs. Chopra's husband
- Kalpana as Mrs. Chopra, Mr. Chopra's wife
- Ashish Bhatia as Mehak, Lekha's fiance (Season 1)
- Singh Rajni as neighbour Aunty (Season 1)
- Dev Dutt as Deepak Shirodkar/Divya's Brother

== Episodes ==
No.	Title	Directed by	Written by	Original release date
1	"Dead On Arrival!"	Apoorva Lakhia	Chintan Gandhi, Suresh Nair	September 23, 2020
2	"Girl In The Mirror"	Apoorva Lakhia	Chintan Gandhi, Suresh Nair	September 23, 2020
3	"Take The Bait"	Apoorva Lakhia	Chintan Gandhi, Suresh Nair	September 23, 2020
4	"Equaliser"	Apoorva Lakhia	Chintan Gandhi, Suresh Nair	September 23, 2020
5	"Red Flag"	Apoorva Lakhia	Chintan Gandhi, Suresh Nair	September 23, 2020
6	"No Way Out"	Apoorva Lakhia	Chintan Gandhi, Suresh Nair	September 23, 2020
7	"De-Cipner"	Apoorva Lakhia	Chintan Gandhi, Suresh Nair	September 23, 2020
8	"Final Crackdown"	Apoorva Lakhia	Chintan Gandhi, Suresh Nair	September 23, 2020

== Reception ==
Shweta Keshri of India Today praised performance of entire cast and wrote "Saqib Saleem as Riyaz Pathan is seen flexing his muscles and going shirtless in a couple of scenes, Iqbal Khan, is seen hurling expletives as Zorawar Kalra. Shriya Pilagaonkar impresses as Divya aka Mariyam but Waluscha De Sousa turned out to the surprise package of the show. Rajesh Tailang was as usual brilliant in his part as the RAW chief." Ruchi Kaushal of Hindustan Times wrote "The success of a suspense thriller lies in its ability to offer the unexpected and Crackdown never loses its way down unnecessary twists. Unlike the emotional aspect of The Family Man, The Voot Select original doesn’t come with distractions of romance or comedy, keeping its eye firmly on thriller aspect." Ronak Kotecha of The Times of India rated 3.5 our 5 stars and wrote "The show loses steam midway as a host of characters are introduced making an already complex screenplay even more crowded. While the overall plot remains intense, too many subplots are a dampener." Nandini Ramnath of Scroll.in wrote "Determinedly preposterous and as riveting as a train wreck in slow motion, Crackdown makes short work of narrative intelligence as it rips through the terrorism thriller template." Avinash Ramachandran of Cinema Express rated 2.5 star out of 5 stars and wrote "In a series about terrorism will, of course, have good Muslims and bad ones. The angle of in-house sabotage and Islamophobia, brought in by RAW’s deputy director Zorawar (Iqbal Khan), adds some inadvertent humour, and the final resolution for this angle is even more laughable." Roktim Rajpal for Deccan Herald wrote "Crackdown opens on a mildly engaging note before flattering to deceive. The narrative lacks a sense of urgency, which makes it difficult for fans to relate to or even care about the reel action. Most of the twists, barring the one seen towards the end of the fourth episode, fall flat."
