= Harshi =

British singer and actress

- Born: Harshida Madhaparia; 6 May 1987 (age 39); London, United Kingdom
- Other name: Harshi Mad
- Occupations: Singer; perforer; actress
- Musical career
- Origin: London
- Genres: Bollywood; Classical; Pop; Hip hop; Bhangra; Garba
- Instrument: Vocals
- Years active: 2007–present
- Website: harshimad.com

Harshida Madhaparia (born 6 May 1987), known mononymously as Harshi, is a British singer and actress, based in Mumbai. She is a singer and performer in Hindi, English, Gujarati, and Punjabi. She performs in multiple genres, including IndiPop, Hip Hop, Bollywood, Bhangra, Garba, and classical. She also performs under the stage name Harshi Mad.

She has won multiple awards including the Indian Idol UK, and reached the finals of Indian Idol 3 in India. She also reached the finals of Sa Re Ga Ma Pa.

She was also one of the judges for the finals of a singing competition called "Sur Gujarat Ke", along with Altaf Raja and Dr. Krupesh Thacker in Gandhidham, Gujarat. The auditions were held in Mundra, Mandavi, Bhuj, Anjar and Gandhidham.

== Early life and background ==
Harshi Mad was born on 6 May 1987 in London and based in Mumbai since 2007. She has two brothers and is the youngest of her siblings. She had been a dance instructor at a cultural arts school since a young age. She was inspired to sing after her older brother, Paresh Madhaparia, reached the finals of Sa Re Ga Ma Pa 2005 while representing the UK. Mad moved to Mumbai in 2007 at the age of 20 to pursue her career in music. Since moving to India, she has trained under music director Kuldeep Singh for Indian classical music. Additionally, she has also trained at Anupam Kher's acting institute, Actor Prepares. She has featured in the Indian Hindi movie "Holiday”.

== Awards and screen presence ==
- Winner of the UK's Indian Idol.
- Judged Finale of "Sur Gujarat ke" singing competition across Gujarat at Gandhidham
- Finalist of Indian Idol 3 amongst millions of contestants from India, UK and UAE.
- Finalist of Sa Re Ga Ma Pa UK – picked by Himesh Reshammiya.
- Hosted UK's auditions for Indian Idol 4.
- VJ on Sony TV in UK.
- Top 2 Boogie Woogie –selected by Naved and Javed Jaffrey.
- Recorded vocals, jingles, and written lyrics for top music directors such as: Rajesh Roshan, Aadesh Shrivastav, Anand Raj Anand, Monty Sharma, Sandesh Sandaliya, Sachin & Jigar.
- Performed in UK with many artists such as Dannii Minogue, Raghav, Malkit Singh, Jazzy B, Juggy D, Jay Sean.
- Toured around the world with artists like Sunidhi Chauhan, Adnan Sami, Mika Singh, Sukhwinder Singh, Shreya Ghoshal, Kunal Ganjawala and Sonu Nigam.

== Filmography ==
=== Film ===
Year	Title	Role	Notes	Ref
2014	Holiday: A Soldier Is Never Off Duty	Marathi bride	credited as Harshi Madhaparia	

== Concerts and other activities ==
Mad has performed in various countries around the globe including various locations in Europe, the Middle East, and South East Asia.

She, along with singers Altaf Raja and Dr. Krupesh Thacker, have appeared as judges at the finale of the singing competition "Sur Gujarat ke" across Gujarat, 3Gandhidham.
