= Poison (TV series) =

2019 Indian web series

- Promotional poster
- Genre: Action; Crime; Thriller
- Written by: Shiraz Ahmed
- Directed by: Jatin Wagle
- Country of origin: India
- Original language: Hindi
- No. of seasons: 2
- No. of episodes: 11

Production
- Production location: India
- Running time: Approx. 31 minutes
- Production company: Altus Media

Original release
- Network: ZEE5
- Release: 19 April 2019

Poison is a 2019 Indian Hindi-language action crime thriller web series that is streaming on ZEE5. The 11-episode series is written by Shiraz Ahmed and directed by Jatin Wagle. It stars Arbaaz Khan, Riya Sen, Freddy Daruwala and Tanuj Virwani. The series is Arbaaz Khan's digital debut.

== Synopsis ==
Ranveer (Tanuj Virwani) completes his prison sentence for a crime he did not commit. He sets out to Goa in a quest for revenge. Vikram (Freddy) is a DSP who aspires to become the police commissioner and sets out to nab Antonio Verghese (Arbaaz), a don who operates from Goa. What happens when the lives of these three men entwine with each other forms the crux of the series.

== Cast ==
- Tanuj Virwani as Ranveer
- Freddy Daruwala as DSP Vikram
- Arbaaz Khan as Antonio Verghese
- Riya Sen as Natasha
- Pankaj Dheer as Barrister D’Costa
- Romit Raj as Jai Dixit
- Archanna Guptaa as Megha
- Ruhani Sharma as Jhanvi
- Pranati Rai Prakash as Ashu
- Saakshi Pradhan as Rani
- Gaurav Sharma as Pawan
- Bikramjeet Kanwarpal as Commissioner
- Darshan Gokani as Jacob
- Faisal Rashid as Inspector

== Production ==
Poison was one of the 72 shows that were announced at ZEE5's first-anniversary event in February 2019. However, reports about the series’ cast were being made as early as January 2019. The series marks the second collaboration between Arbaaz Khan and ZEE5, after the webcast of his talk show, Pinch. Along with Arbaaz Khan, actor Freddy Daruwala also makes his digital debut with this series.

Zee5 announced the second season Poison 2 which released on 16 October 2020.

== Episodes ==
| No. overall | No. in season | Title | Directed by | Concept & Story | Original release date |
|---|---|---|---|---|---|
| 1 | 1 | "The Hunter's Scent" | Jatin Wagle | Shiraz Ahmed | 19 April 2019 |
After his release from jail, Ranveer eliminates one of his enemies and moves to Goa. The Police Commissioner, who is on the verge of retirement, enlists DSP Vikram to nab Antonio Verghese, a notorious don from Goa. Meanwhile, sub-inspector Nandu investigates the murder committed by Ranveer.
| 2 | 2 | "The Web" | Jatin Wagle | Shiraz Ahmed | 19 April 2019 |
DSP Vikram readies his men to seize Antonio’s drug consignment. Ranveer purchases Cheetos club in Goa and is warned about the local don, Dominic. Meanwhile, Chris misbehaves with Jhanvi at a club before Ranveer comes to her rescue.
| 3 | 3 | "Shades" | Jatin Wagle | Shiraz Ahmed | 19 April 2019 |
While Vikram leaves for Mumbai to raid Horizon Infra, Ranveer takes advantage of his absence and tries to impress Vikram’s family members. Rani and her gang kill the broker and break into Ranveer’s house. Meanwhile, Natasha and Vikram land up in the same hotel room.
| 4 | 4 | "Stalking" | Jatin Wagle | Shiraz Ahmed | 19 April 2019 |
Ranveer reaches home and is shocked to see Vishram’s dead body and is threatened by Rani. Following Antonio’s orders, Domini kills Milind’s son. Vikram and Megha arrive for the reopening of Cheetos, now owned by Ranveer.
| 5 | 5 | "The Game Begins" | Jatin Wagle | Shiraz Ahmed | 19 April 2019 |
At the Cheetos reopening party, Vikram and Megha celebrate their wedding anniversary. Later, Ranveer is threatened by Dominic and blackmailed by Rani. Ranveer secretly clones Vikram’s phone and strikes a deal with Sridhar to betray his boss, Antonio Verghese.
| 6 | 6 | "Tit for Tat" | Jatin Wagle | Shiraz Ahmed | 19 April 2019 |
While keeping an eye on Vikram’s family, Ranveer sees Jai Dixit and realises that he must do something about him soon. Vikram meets Natasha who gives him a tip about Antonio Verghese. Later, when Ashu, Jhanvi and Ranveer get high, Ashu feels insecure about Jhanvi and Ranveer’s closeness and takes a drastic step.
| 7 | 7 | "Confession" | Jatin Wagle | Shiraz Ahmed | 19 April 2019 |
While Vikram and Megha worry about Ashu, Jhanvi seeks Ranveer’s help to handle her. Rani continues to blackmail Ranveer and is later attacked at the hotel. Ranveer meets Dominic and shows him the murder video. Later, when Ranveer meets Vikram and his family, Vikram confronts Ranveer about his relationship with his sister and is shocked to know about Ranveer’s past.
| 8 | 8 | "The Rift" | Jatin Wagle | Shiraz Ahmed | 19 April 2019 |
Vikram asks Patil to find all the information related to Ranveer’s case and forbids his family from meeting Ranveer. The cops find Jai Dixit’s dead body which leads to a face-off between Vikram and Ranveer. With Sridhar’s help, Vikram manages to gather proof and arrest Antonio Verghese. Meanwhile, Rani joins hands with Dominic and Vikram and Megha have an argument over Ranveer.
| 9 | 9 | "Blackmail" | Jatin Wagle | Shiraz Ahmed | 19 April 2019 |
Ranveer is held captive in his own house and Jhanvi goes in search of him but they meet at a wrong time. When Antonio’s bail gets rejected, Vikram asks Natasha to leave the town, as her life gets complicated with problems. Meanwhile, Ranveer meets Jhanvi and reveals about his past. Natasha calls Megha home where Megha gets the shock of her life.
| 10 | 10 | "Trap" | Jatin Wagle | Shiraz Ahmed | 19 April 2019 |
Vikram gets furious and slaps Jhanvi for meeting Ranveer. Chris leaves with his gang to kill Ranveer but Rani interferes and stops them. Upset over his bail getting rejected, Verghese gets Vikram framed in a fake corruption case and Megha comes to bail him out. Using this opportunity, Ranveer kidnaps Vikram’s family.
| 11 | 11 | "Face Off" | Jatin Wagle | Shiraz Ahmed | 19 April 2019 |
Vikram gets furious to know that Ranveer spied on his family and has kidnapped them. Unable to contact his family, Vikram seeks help from the Commissioner. Finally, Ranveer calls Vikram to an isolated guest house where the family is being held captive. Will Vikram manage to save his family?
