= Toofan (2010 film) =

- Directed by: Major Ravi
- Written by: Sajid-Farhad (dialogues)
- Screenplay by: Major Ravi
- Story by: Major Ravi
- Produced by: Santhosh Damomdar
- Starring: Dileep; Rajpal Yadav
- Cinematography: Shaji Kumar
- Edited by: V. Jaisankar
- Music by: Sajid-Farhad (songs); C Rajamani (score)
- Production company: Damor Cinema
- Distributed by: YouTube
- Release date: 2010
- Running time: 85 minutes
- Country: India
- Language: Hindi

Toofan is a 2010 Indian Hindi-language period children's comedy film directed by Major Ravi starring Dileep (in his Hindi debut) with Rajpal Yadav in lead roles with Shakti Kapoor and Gufi Paintal in a supporting role. The film had a delayed release in 2010. It marks the Hindi debut of most of the crew, including Dileep. The film was also released on YouTube as Mohili Gaav, and it was dubbed in Malayalam as Oru Avadhikaalam.

== Cast ==
- Dileep as Charan Laathi
- Rajpal Yadav as Raju
- Shakti Kapoor as Pandit
- Gufi Paintal as Pooru Chacha
- Amey Anil Pandya as Jayanthilal
- Chinmay Anand Kambili as Chottu
- Shreyas Sri Krishna Paranjpe as Pallu
- Shalee Deepak Vaishav as Munni
- Farida as Savithri
- Shervy as Jayanthi's father
- Saba Khan as Charan's wife
- Harry Paintal as Sevanand
- Major Ravi as a lorry driver (cameo appearance)
- Ravi Mariya as the police inspector (uncredited)

== Production ==
Dr. Jayan Titty George, the producer of Vachanam, also plays a small role in the film.

The film was produced by Santhosh Damodharan and was shot in Mumbai.

== Release ==
After its 2010 release, the film was dubbed an released in Malayalam in 2016 as Oru Avadhikaalam. The film was also released on YouTube in 2018 as Mohili Gaav with Rajpal Yadav credited first.
