= Freddy Daruwala =

Indian model and actor (born 1984)

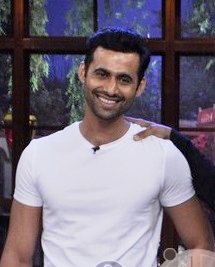
- Daruwala promoting Holiday at an event in 2014
- Born: Farhad Daruwala; 12 May 1984 (age 42); Surat, Gujarat, India
- Occupations: Actor; model
- Years active: 2014–present
- Height: 1.83 m (6 ft 0 in)
- Spouse: Crystal Variava
- Children: 2

Freddy Daruwala (born 12 May 1984) is an Indian model and actor who works in Hindi films.

== Personal life ==
Freddy Daruwala was born on 12 May 1984 in Surat, Gujarat. He is of Parsi and Gujarati descent.

He holds a Master of Business Administration.

Daruwala is married to Crystal Variava, a doctor and together they have 2 sons.

== Career ==
He made his film debut in 2014 in the film Holiday.

In 2019, he starred in ZEE's thriller series Poison alongside Arbaaz Khan and Riya Sen.

== Public image ==
In 2018 and 2020, he was named as Gujarat's "Most Desirable Man" by The Times of India.

== Filmography ==
Year	Film	Role	Notes
2014	Holiday	Sleeper cell's Leader	
2016	Force 2	Harish	Cameo appearance
2017	Commando 2	ACP Bakhtawar Khan	
2017	Rachna No Dabbo	Dabbu	Gujarati film
2018	Touch Chesi Chudu	Irfan Lala	Telugu film
2018	Race 3	Rana Singha	
2018	Suryansh	Karan Rana	Gujarati film
2023	Chatrapathi	Bhairav Solanki	
2026	Rubam	TBA	Tamil film

== Television ==
Year	Title	Role	Platform	Notes
2019	Poison	DSP Vikram	ZEE5	
2022	Dharavi Bank	Mahesh	MX Player	
2022–present	Crackdown	Terrorist Abu Khalil/Mateen	JioCinema	
2023	Inspector Avinash	Home Minister	JioCinema	
2026	Taskaree: The Smuggler's Web	Rahul	Netflix series	

=== Music videos ===
Year	Title	Artist(s)	Ref.
2023	Sadi Gali 2.0	Zaara Yesmin	
