= Sakshi Pradhan =

Indian TV actress, model and a travel host

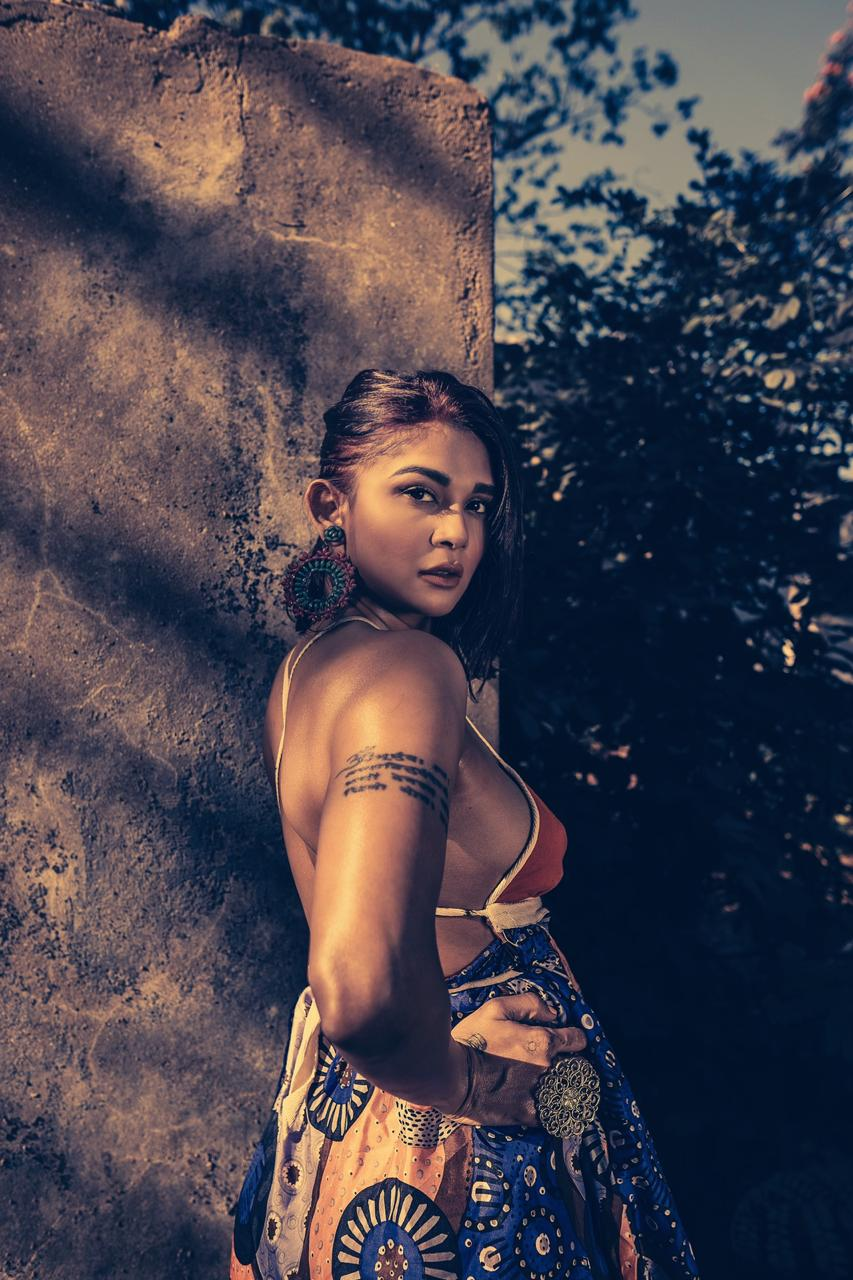
- Sakshi Pradhan in Goa, 2020
- Born: 12 August 1992 (age 33)
- Occupations: Actress, model
- Years active: 2009-2010,2013,2016-2019,2020,2023
- Known for: Poison (web series)
- Title: Winner MTV Splitsvilla Season 2

Sakshi Pradhan (pronounced as sahk-shee pruh-dhaan) is an Indian TV actress, model and a travel host. She started her career at the age of 18 and won season 2 of the reality show MTV Splitsvilla. In 2018, Sakshi hosted the travel show Kissed By The Sea: Mauritius on Travelxp. She is known for playing the character of Rani in Poison (2019), a web series by ZEE5.

== Filmography ==
=== Television ===
Year	Show	Role	Notes
2009	MTV Splitsvilla 2	Contestant	Winner
2010	Bigg Boss 4	Contestant	14th place
2013	Tequila Nights	Tanya	Telefilm on Zoom
2016	Sexy Sakshi season 3	VJ	
2018	Naagin 3	Ravee	
2018	Kissed By The Sea	VJ	

=== Films ===
Year	Title	Role	Language	Note
2013	Lakshmi	Item girl	Kannada	
2023	MR-9: Do or Die	Devi	English	Bangladeshi-American join production film
2023	Yaariyan 2	Siraa	Hindi	

=== Web series ===
Year	Title	Role	Platform
2016	Badman	Asha	Voot
2018	Tamanna	Meesha Choudhary	Viu
2019	Booo: Sabki Phategi	Actress	ALTBalaji
2019	Poison	Rani	ZEE5
2019	Peshawar		Ullu App
2019	Ragini MMS: Returns	Simon	ALTBalaji
2020	Poison 2	Rani	ZEE5
