= Holiday: A Soldier Is Never Off Duty =

2014 Indian film by AR Murugadoss

- Theatrical release poster
- Directed by: A. R. Murugadoss
- Written by: A. R. Murugadoss
- Based on: Thuppakki by A. R. Murugadoss
- Produced by: Aruna Bhatia; Vipul Amrutlal Shah
- Starring: Akshay Kumar; Sonakshi Sinha; Freddy Daruwala
- Cinematography: Natty Subramaniam
- Edited by: Amitabh Shukla
- Music by: Songs: Pritam; Guest Composition: Kaushik Dutta; Background Score: Prasad Sashte
- Production companies: Reliance Entertainment; Hari Om Entertainment; Cape of Good Films; Cinema Capital Venture Fund; Sunshine Pictures
- Distributed by: Reliance Entertainment
- Release date: 6 June 2014
- Running time: 161 minutes
- Country: India
- Language: Hindi
- Budget: ₹50 crore
- Box office: est. ₹180 crore

Holiday: A Soldier Is Never Off Duty is a 2014 Indian Hindi-language action thriller film written and directed by A. R. Murugadoss, starring Akshay Kumar as an army officer. It also stars Sonakshi Sinha, Freddy Daruwala, Sumeet Raghavan and Govinda in a special appearance. It is an official remake of Murugadoss' own 2012 Tamil film Thuppakki (2012) and follows an Indian Army officer who arrives in Mumbai on vacation and sets out to hunt down the terrorist leader of a sleeper cell network and deactivate the sleeper cells operating under his command.

Kumar revealed that the story of Holiday was signed by his production company Hari Om Entertainment after listening to the first action sequence of the film by Murugadoss even before the script was fully written. He let Murugadoss make the film in Tamil as Thuppakki due to date issues, and later announced its remake. Production commenced in 2013 with the initial working title Pistol under the banner of Hari Om Entertainment and Sunshine Pictures.

The film was released worldwide on 6 June 2014. Made on a budget of ₹500 million, The film received generally positive reviews from the critics, particularly for Kumar's performance, writing and action sequences. It proved to be one of the top grossing Bollywood films of 2014. with worldwide earnings of over ₹180 crore.

At 60th Filmfare Awards, Kumar was nominated for Best Actor.

== Plot ==
Virat Bakshi, a Captain in DIA, a secret wing of Indian Army, returns to his home in Mumbai on a 40-day holiday. On his arrival, his parents rush him to meet Saiba Thapar, who they wanted him to marry. But Virat rejects her with an excuse that she is old fashioned and not his type. On the contrary, Saiba is a professional boxer, and is completely modern in her outlook. Virat notices her in a boxing match and falls in love with her instantly.

One day, while travelling in a bus with his friend, Sub-Inspector Mukund "Makiya" Deshmukh, Virat, while chasing a man who he regards with suspicion when he tries to flee the scene of a check going on after a passenger reports his wallet as stolen, witnesses a bomb explosion killing innocent people. Virat manages to capture the man, Ajmal Lateef, who he realizes is a terrorist and has planted the bomb, but he escapes from the hospital with the help of a police mole. Virat kidnaps Ajmal again, interrogates him to ascertain the name of the police mole and also forces the police mole, corrupt ACP Ashok Gaikwad to commit suicide. He later discovers while examining contents in Ajmal's bag that a terrorist group has planned serial blasts in Mumbai to be executed in a couple of days with the help of 12 sleeper agents, including Ajmal himself. Virat remembers that on the day when the bombs are going to be planted, there is a wedding where his team member Joel is tying the knot, and all his Army officer friends are going to assemble. Along with his fellow Army officers and Mukund, Virat manages to track these bombers, Ajmal included, and kills them before they could trigger the bombs.

When the leader of these sleeper cells, whose brother, Afsar Ali, was also one of the sleeper bombers, finds out about the team of officers involved in the failure of the terrorist attack, he goes to Joel's house and kills his family and finds an album which has photos of team officers. He targets one officer's female relative from each team and kidnaps them. When Virat realises the plan, he substitutes one of the girls to be kidnapped, with his younger sister Preeti. Using his pet dog Rocky and his sister Preeti's dupatta, he manages to reach the terrorists' hideout. He eliminates all the terrorists and rescues all the victims, including Preeti, who was about to be killed after Virat's bluff was exposed. Virat also captures Asif Ali, who was the leader of the group but later kills him on realising that Asif is just the second-in-command of the sleeper cells.

When this tactic fails, the leader of the sleeper cells decides to target the primary assailant himself. He kills Kapil and his family, he being one of the army officers, through a blast, and forces Virat, who he discovers is the man responsible for Afsar's death, to surrender. Virat decides to sacrifice his life and plans a suicide attack by instructing Mukund and his fellow officer Joel to follow him via a tracking chip inserted in his arm and plant a bomb at the terrorists' hideout. Virat then drives to a port in various cars, as instructed by the sleeper cells leader, and ends up on a ship full of terrorists. To his shock, Virat finds out that the cars he was asked to drive had bombs in them, which will frame him and his team as terrorists and also boost their plans to recruit sleeper cells in the Indian Army with the help of the Joint Defence Secretary of India, Alvin D'Souza, who is also a member of this terrorist group. Meanwhile, Joel, who was in touch with Mukund as instructed by Virat, plants a bomb at the base of the ship. By this time, Virat realises he must get out alive, but during the one-on-one fight with the sleeper cells' leader, his shoulder is dislocated. However, he is able to pop it back into place and escapes with the sleeper cells' leader, holding him alive at gunpoint and later riding out with him on a boat before the ship explodes; when the ship explodes, Virat shoots the man down. The film ends with Virat forcing Alvin D'Souza to commit suicide and later returning to guard the border along with his team while their holiday concludes.

== Cast ==
- Akshay Kumar as Captain Virat Bakshi, a Soldier in DIA (a wing of Indian Army)
- Sonakshi Sinha as Saiba Thapar, a boxer and later Virat's girlfriend
- Govinda as Major Pratap Panikar, Virat's senior commanding officer (special appearance)
- Freddy Daruwala as the leader of the sleeper cells (credited as Farhad)
- Sumeet Raghavan as Mukund 'Makhiya' Deshmukh, Virat's friend and a Sub-Inspector in Mumbai Police
- Zakir Hussain as Alvin D'Souza, Joint Secretary of Defence
- Dipendra Sharma as Asif Ali, the second-in-command of the sleeper cells
- Nishank Amar as Ajmal Lateef, the bus terrorist who is captured and interrogated by Virat, only to be shot dead later during the counterattack
- Gauri Pandit as Mrs. Bakshi, Virat's mother
- Premnath Gulati as Mr. Bakshi, Virat's father
- Gireesh Sahdev as ACP Ashok Gaikwad
- Cherry Mardia as Preeti Bakshi, Virat's younger sister
- Apoorva Arora as Pinkie Bakshi, Virat's younger sister
- Rocky as Police Dog
- Indira Krishnan as Mrs. Thapar, Saiba's mother
- Rajesh Khatri as Mr. Thapar, Saiba's father
- Sunita Shirole as Saiba's grandmother
- Aackruti Nagpal as Saiba's friend
- Madhu Raj as Saiba's friend
- Abhay Shukla as Virat's teammate
- Chirag Sethi as Virat's fellow soldier
- Harshi as Marathi Bride, Saiba's friend
- Prayas Mann as Afsar Ali, the sleeper cell leader's brother and a sleeper cell

Uncredited

- Randheer Rai as Lieutenant William Martin Joel, the groom and Virat's fellow soldier
- Maroof Raza in a special appearance

== Production ==
The film's production commenced in 2013 with the working title of Pistol under the banner of Cape Of Good Films and Sunshine Pictures. The songs are composed by Pritam Chakraborty, while the background score is composed by Prasad Sashte. The stunt coordinator of the film is Greg Powell.

The production budget of Holiday is around ₹300 million (US$3.1 million) without Akshay Kumar remuneration, print and advertising costs. According to the director A. R. Murugadoss, Akshay's role is that of an Army officer for which Akshay lost some weight to fit in the role and to look 12 years younger from his real biological age. Kumar also sported a crew-cut hairstyle for his role. Whilst Sonakshi will play the role of boxer and Virat (Kumar's) love interest Saiba. Model and debutant Freddy Daruwala will play the main antagonist pitted against Kumar.

The film was originally scheduled for a release in early May 2014, which would have clashed with the release of Action Jackson. However, Action Jackson was pushed to December 2014.

== Soundtrack ==
Holiday: A Soldier Is Never Off Duty

Soundtrack album by Pritam Chakraborty
- Released: 12 May 2014
- Recorded: 2014
- Genre: Feature film soundtrack
- Length: 30:42
- Language: Hindi
- Label: Zee Music Company
- Producer: Pritam Chakraborty

Pritam Chakraborty chronology
Shaadi Ke Side Effects (2014)	Holiday: A Soldier Is Never Off Duty (2014)	Bajrangi Bhaijaan (2015)
External audio
- Audio Jukebox on YouTube

The film's soundtrack album composed by Pritam, was released on 12 May 2014. The songs were released on 2 June 2014. The lyrics were written by Irshad Kamil for the songs featured in the film. Sukumar Dutta wrote the lyrics for the Song "Palang tod". Prasad Sashte composed the background score of the film. A reprise version of the song "Ashq Na Ho" was released on 17 March 2016. The reprise version was sung by singer Asees Kaur.

=== Track listing ===
No.	Title	Lyrics	Music	Singer(s)	Length
1.	"Shaayraana"	Irshad Kamil	Pritam	Arijit Singh	4:21
2.	"Tu Hi Toh Hai" (Film Version)	Irshad Kamil	Pritam	Kunal Ganjawala	3:55
3.	"Ashq Na Ho"	Irshad Kamil	Pritam	Arijit Singh	5:53
4.	"Blame The Night"	Irshad Kamil	Pritam	Arijit Singh, Aditi Singh Sharma, Piyush Kapoor	4:39
5.	"Palang Tod" (Version 1)	Sukumar Dutta	Kaushik Dutta	Mika Singh, Ritu Pathak	3:46
6.	"Tu Hi Toh Hai"	Irshad Kamil	Pritam	Benny Dayal	3:58
7.	"Palang Tod" (Version 2)	Sukumar Dutta	Kaushik Dutta	Mika Singh, Ritu Pathak	4:10
Total length:					30:42

== Reception ==
=== Critical response ===
The film has received positive reviews from the critics. ABP News similarly rated it 4.5/5, calling it a "fast-paced, exhilarating roller coaster ride" Taran Adarsh gave 4/5 and states that it is a slick action-thriller that keeps you engrossed, enthralled and captivated all through, thanks to its fascinating premise and a watertight, razor-sharp screenplay.

The Times of India gave the film 3.5 ratings describing it as "This one applauds the jawans who live in the jaws of death, and is a 'wake up' call for all the 'sleepers' that abound. Bravo!" Rachel Saltz of The New York Times stated that "The action sequences mostly have tension and punch, even if the movie is old-school long – 2 hours 41 minutes – and the plot doesn't bear too much scrutiny". The romantic angle of the film was criticised by some. Hindustan Times praised the performance of Akshay Kumar. Rajeev Masand of CNN-IBN gave 2 stars out of 5, commenting "That this film is still not as awful as most typical Akshay Kumar starrers, despite several such harebrained sequences, is to the credit of director AR Murgadoss, who doesn't let something as insignificant as common sense come in the way of telling a convenient story. In Holiday, Murgadoss remakes his own Tamil hit Thuppaki and he doesn't tinker with the blueprint at all."

Filmfare critic praised the film as a "Genuinely smart action thriller". Raja Sen of Rediff gave the film 1.5 out of 5 stars and said, "Holiday takes obscene amounts of time getting to the point."

=== Box office ===
The film has a worldwide gross collection of ₹180 crore against a budget of ₹50 crore. Hence, it was a box office success.

Territory	Collection
India	₹153.43 crore Nett gross: ₹112.53 crore
Overseas	₹24.97 crore
