= Laxmii =

2020 Indian film by Raghava Lawrence

- Official release poster
- Directed by: Raghava Lawrence
- Screenplay by: Raghava Lawrence; Farhad Samji; Sparsh Khetarpal; Tasha Bhambra
- Story by: Raghava Lawrence
- Based on: Kanchana by Raghava Lawrence
- Produced by: Akshay Kumar; Tusshar Kapoor; Shabina Khan
- Starring: Akshay Kumar; Kiara Advani; Sharad Kelkar
- Cinematography: Vetri Palanisamy; Kush Chhabria
- Edited by: Rajesh G. Pandey
- Music by: Score: Amar Mohile; Songs: Tanishk Bagchi; Shashi–DJ Khushi; Ullumanati
- Production companies: Fox Star Studios; Cape of Good Films; Shabinaa Entertainment; Tusshar Entertainment House
- Distributed by: Disney+ Hotstar
- Release date: 9 November 2020
- Running time: 141 minutes
- Country: India
- Language: Hindi

Laxmii is a 2020 Indian Hindi-language horror comedy film written and directed by Raghava Lawrence, marking his directorial debut in the Hindi film industry. A remake of his director's own Tamil film Kanchana (2011), it stars Akshay Kumar, Kiara Advani and Sharad Kelkar, while Ayesha Raza Mishra, Rajesh Sharma and Ashwini Kalsekar play pivotal roles. The film revolves around a man who gets possessed by the ghost of a transgender person. Kumar, also produced the film under his Cape of Good Films and Fox Star Studios, along with Tusshar Kapoor's newly launched production company,

Tusshar Entertainment House and Shabinaa Entertainment. Lawrence co-wrote the script along with Farhad Samji, Sparsh Khetarpal, Tasha Bhambra, with Samji adapting the screenplay and dialogues to the Hindi version. The film was announced in January 2019, whilst the principal photography began in April 2019 and ended in March 2020.

Laxmii was originally scheduled for a theatrical release on 22 May 2020, but the release was postponed due to the COVID-19 pandemic. It was later streamed digitally through Disney+ Hotstar on 9 November 2020, across India, thus becoming the first big-budget Bollywood film to release on a streaming platform. It was not released theatrically in India, but it was released in theatres in the United Arab Emirates, Fiji, Australia, and New Zealand. It received mostly negative reviews from critics and the audience, with criticism for the writing, screenplay, narration, editing and performances, although Sharad Kelkar's performance was praised.

== Plot ==
Asif Ahmed, who doesn't believe in ghosts, lives with his wife Rashmi Rajput and nephew Shaan. They're invited to Rashmi's parents' Ratna and Sachin's house in Daman for their silver jubilee. Rashmi's father disapproves of the couple as Rashmi, a Hindu, had eloped with Asif, a Muslim, but her mother is kind to them. They meet Rashmi's brother Deepak and his wife, Ashwini. Asif and Shaan visit the grounds next door that are believed to be haunted. While he is putting stumps into the ground for a game of cricket, the stumps hit a buried body. Blood gets on the stumps but Asif mistakes it for wet soil and washes it off into the house's lemongrass plant.

Following this, Ratna, Ashwini, and Deepak all have supernatural experiences in the house. Following a priest's instructions, they confirm that there is indeed a spirit present among them. Asif makes lemongrass tea with the same plant he washed the blood in. When he drinks it, the ghost possesses him, and he begins to act effeminate, and goes on killing sprees at night, alerting the family except Asif, that something is wrong. It is revealed that three ghosts have kept him: a violent transgender woman, a Muslim man, and a mentally disabled boy. Asif's family hires an exorcist who drives the main spirit out of his body; trapped, the ghost reveals her story.

Laxman Sharma alias Laxmii was disowned by her parents as a child for being transgender. She is taken in by a kind Muslim named Abdul Chacha, who has a mentally disabled son. Regretting that she could not become a doctor because of her parents' lack of support, Laxmii adopts another transgender girl named Geeta and works hard to support her financially. When Geeta leaves to study medicine abroad, Laxmii buys a plot of land to construct a hospital. The crooked MLA Girja illegally seizes her property. When Laxmii angrily confronts Girja and his wife, they brutally murder her, Abdul Chacha and his son, and bury the bodies in Laxmii's own land, the grounds that are now next door. Laxmii has already killed Girja's henchmen while possessing Asif earlier.

After hearing her story, Asif is heartbroken at the lack of justice for her. Thus, he willingly lets her possess him once more to complete her revenge. Laxmi kills Girja's wife and bodyguards but Girja seeks refuge in a Goddess Durga temple, which Laxmii cannot enter, being a ghost. However, Asif, being human, can enter and has Laxmii leave his body before forcibly dragging Girja out. Laxmii returns and finally kills Girja. Three months later, Asif constructed the hospital as per Laxmii's dream. It is revealed that Laxmii now exists symbiotically in Asif's body to help him out when the need arises.

== Cast ==
- Akshay Kumar as Asif Ahmed and Laxmi Sharma (Possessed by Sharad Kelkar)
- Kiara Advani as Rashmi Rajput
- Sharad Kelkar as Laxman Sharma aka Laxmi Sharma
  - Aryan Preet as Little Laxman
- Rajesh Sharma as Sachin Rajput
- Ayesha Raza as Ratna Rajput
- Manu Rishi as Deepak Rajput
- Ashwini Kalsekar as Ashwini Rajput
- Tarun Arora as MLA Girija Shankar
- Muskaan Khubchandani as Palak
- Prachi Shah as Supriya Shankar
- Adhvik Mahajan as Angad Shankar
- Amika Shail as Ankita Jain
- Aazeen Shaikh as Geeta, Laxmii's adopted girl
- Biju Antony as Pankaj Rana
- Vinita Joshi as Anjali Kaul
- Mir Sarwar as Abdul Chacha
- Rajesh Dubeay as Panditji
- Vijay Jasper as Muslim Priest
- Arun Shekhar as Sarpanch, The panchayat president
- Chetan Pandit as Abhishek
- Kundan Kumar as Chittu, Abhishek's 1st assistant
- Nandu Ramesh as Chinnu, Abhishek's 2nd assistant
- Grace Girdhar as Shruti

== Production ==
=== Development ===
In January 2019, media reports suggested that Akshay Kumar will star in the remake of Kanchana (2011), directed by Raghava Lawrence, who also signed to helm the Hindi version of it, thus making his debut in Bollywood, whereas Kiara Advani, plays the female lead. The film marks Kumar's return to horror comedy-genre after a decade since Bhool Bhulaiyaa (2007). Sources claimed that the sequences in the film will be different as of the original counterpart. Farhad Samji, who directed the actor's Housefull 4 (2019), wrote the screenplay for the film, with sources claimed that the work took six months to complete the adaptation. The film marks the debut of Tusshar Kapoor's stint as a producer, who bought the rights of the film, post licensing his production house in early 2013. On 22 April 2019, the film's title was revealed as Laxmmi Bomb. The titular poster featuring Kumar was released on 18 May 2019.

=== Filming ===
The principal photography of the film began on 22 April 2019. The film came in the middle of controversy after Raghava Lawrence, quit the film in May 2019, as Kumar released the first look without consulting him. It was revealed that the director does not have any credit, in the poster which resulted him to quit the film. In June 2019, Lawrence announced his return to direction, after sorting out issues with Kumar.

The second schedule of the film began in August 2019. The song "Burj Khalifa" featuring Akshay Kumar and Kiara was filmed in Dubai in January 2020. The climax scene of the film was shot at Mumbai on 26 February 2020, and filming was completed on 1 March 2020.

== Music ==
Laxmii

Soundtrack album by Tanishk Bagchi, Shashi–DJ Khushi and Ullumanati
- Released: 27 November 2020
- Recorded: 2019–2020
- Genre: Feature film soundtrack
- Length: 14:57
- Language: Hindi
- Label: Zee Music Company

The film's music was composed by Tanishk Bagchi, Shashi–DJ Khushi and Ullumanati while lyrics written by Vayu, Gagan Ahuja, Farhad Samji and Ullumanati. The background score was composed by Amar Mohile.

The song "Bam Bhole" is the remake of the song of the same name, by its original artists, Viruss and Ullumanati. The original song was released on an independent label called Acme Music, in 2017 and is a superhit song with more than 200 million views on YouTube.

The song "Mata Ka Jagrata" is a medley of the songs "Apna Time Aayega" from Gully Boy, "Kala Chashma" from Baar Baar Dekho and "Main Nikla Gaddi Leke" from Gadar: Ek Prem Katha.

Track listing
No.	Title	Lyrics	Music	Singer(s)	Length
1.	"Burj Khalifa"	Gagan Ahuja	Shashi–DJ Khushi	Shashi–DJ Khushi, Nikhita Gandhi, Madhubanti	3:07
2.	"Bam Bholle"	Ullumanati	Ullumanati	Viruss	3:40
3.	"Start Stop"	Vayu	Tanishk Bagchi	Raja Hasan	3:13
4.	"Maata Ka Jaagrata"	Farhad Samji	Tanishk Bagchi	Farhad Samji	4:57
Total length:					14:57

== Release ==
On the announcement of the first poster release, the film was scheduled for a release on 5 June 2020. But a new release date was announced in August 2019, where the film's release will be advanced to 22 May 2020, coinciding with the festival of Ramzan. The release was further postponed due to the COVID-19 pandemic, in which media reports speculated that the film will be released directly through streaming platforms.

On 29 June 2020, Disney+ Hotstar conducted virtual press conference where Akshay Kumar announced that the film will release through the streaming platform, exclusively as part of Disney+ Hotstar Multiplex initiative which was a result of theatres being shut down due to COVID-19 pandemic. The rights to stream the film was sold to the platform, at an amount of nearly ₹1 billion. In September 2020, it was announced that the film will be scheduled for a release on 9 November 2020, coinciding with the eve of Diwali season and also before the final of the 13th edition of Indian Premier League happened on 10 November 2020. The film was also theatrically released on the same date in select overseas markets such as United Arab Emirates, Australia, New Zealand and Fiji. But the film was not released in theatres across India, with exhibitors stating that they will not screen films which initially released on OTT platforms. Irrespective of this, the premiere of Laxmii was held ahead of the release on 7 November 2020, at a multiplex theatre in New Delhi, with Akshay Kumar and Kiara Advani being present at the event.

The official trailer of the film was released on 9 October 2020. The trailer which released through the official YouTube channel of Fox Star Hindi, had the makers disabling the likes and dislikes ratio of the trailer. Commentators believed that, this is due to the backlash received by Sadak 2, after its trailer became the second most-dlisked video, owing to the nepotism debate sparked after the suicide of Indian actor Sushant Singh Rajput. On a positive note, the film's trailer crossed more than 70 million views within 24 hours of its release.

== Controversy ==
While the film was originally titled Laxmmi Bomb, the film's title was altered due to legal notice sent to the filmmakers on behalf of Shri Rajput Karni Sena. According to the notice, the film's title was considered to be disrespectful to Goddess Lakshmi, thereby hurting Hindu community's sentiments. The notice also demanded a change in the film's title and said that the current one sends out a wrong message to the society. On 29 October 2020, the film's title was changed to Laxmii.

== Reception ==
=== Critical response ===
On the review aggregator website Rotten Tomatoes, 11% of 9 critics' reviews are positive, with an average rating of 3.2/10.

Taran Adarsh reviewing for Bollywood Hungama gave two stars out of five and opined that the film was no match to the original Tamil film Kanchana, the Raghava Lawrence's screenplay is weak, horror had no impact. He praised the performances of Akshay Kumar, Sharad Kelkar and felt that the supporting actors were okay. Concluding the review, he said, "Laxmii lacks the punch. One expected so much more from this film, but it clearly disappoints."

Anna M. M. Vetticad of Firstpost opines that the film is 'shrill' with loud storytelling. She finds Akshay Kumar's acting insufferable but praises the portrayal of Laxmii by Sharad Kelkar. Rating it with one and half stars out of five Vetticad concludes, "Irrespective of its aims, Laxmii serves to further otherize the already ostracised trans community. It is also tacky and insufferable." Shubhra Gupta of The Indian Express gave one star out of five and opines, "Akshay Kumar-starrer is a two-hour clutch-your-head, can-I-really-be-watching-this nonsense, from beginning to end.." Pallabi Dey Purkayastha of The Times of India gave the film two stars out of five, calling it "more noise and less fireworks", she concluded, "Laxmii sets out to be a satire against age-old beliefs and biases – we get it! – but the insipidness of the narrative and whatever follows thereon, butchers the lessons it originally desires to impart." India Today's Divyanshi Sharma wrote, "Laxmii is the perfect watch with your family this festive season. The film has its faults but its heart is in the right place."

Pradeep Kumar of The Hindu stated "Laxmii is what happens when an idea not worth the quantum of its original investment gets more money and a bigger canvas, and is expected to evolve by itself to match the new, grander scale. That doesn't happen; certainly, vengeful spirits cannot make it happen." Stutee Ghosh of Bloomberg Quint, gave the film half out of five stars and stated "Even judging by the Bollywood standard of "brainless comedies" Laxmii falls short miserably. Neither funny nor inspiring and a horror in the most literal sense, it makes mockery of the very things it claims to be celebrating." Rohit Vats of News18 gave the same rating for the film and stated "The gags fall flat and actors appear clueless. Nobody has anything to do expect Kumar and then he also ditches the audience. Usually, even in a bad Akshay Kumar movie, you laugh on some puns but this one is totally devoid of any fun."

=== Audience reaction ===
Laxmii broke the viewership records of Dil Bechara, and became the most watched film on the streaming platform Disney+ Hotstar. But, it was listed in the fourth position in most watched films, which were directly released on OTT platforms, according to a survey from LetsOTT. It was listed in the sixth position on the most searched film in India, according to a report from Google Trends. The film was premiered through Star Gold on 21 March 2021 and registered 25.1 million impressions during the television premiere, a record for any Indian film.
