= Golmaal Returns =

2008 Indian film by Rohit Shetty

- Theatrical release poster
- Directed by: Rohit Shetty
- Written by: Screenplay: Yunus Sajawal; Dialogues: Farhad-Sajid
- Story by: Adapted Story: Rumi Jaffery; Original Story: Mulraj Rajda
- Based on: Aaj Ki Taaza Khabar by: Rajendra Bhatia; Mulraj Rajda
- Produced by: Dhilin Mehta
- Starring: Ajay Devgn; Arshad Warsi; Kareena Kapoor; Shreyas Talpade; Tusshar Kapoor; Amrita Arora; Celina Jaitley; Anjana Sukhani
- Cinematography: Natty Subramaniam
- Edited by: Steven H. Bernard
- Music by: Songs: Pritam; Background Score: Sanjoy Chowdhury
- Production company: Shree Ashtavinayak Cine Vision
- Distributed by: Indian Films
- Release date: 29 October 2008
- Running time: 135 minutes
- Country: India
- Language: Hindi
- Box office: ₹80 crore

Golmaal Returns (transl. Chaos Returns) is a 2008 Indian Hindi-language comedy suspense film directed by Rohit Shetty. The film is a remake of the 1989 Marathi film Pheka Pheki, which itself was inspired by the 1973 Hindi film Aaj Ki Taaza Khabar, it serves as the second installment in the Golmaal film series. The film stars Ajay Devgn, Arshad Warsi, Tusshar Kapoor, Kareena Kapoor and Shreyas Talpade. The film became commercial success. It was the sixth highest-grossing Hindi films of 2008.

== Plot ==
Gopal lives with his wife Ekta, who is addicted to watching Indian dramas and soap operas. He also lives with his sister Esha and Ekta's mute brother, his brother in law Lucky. Lucky is in love with a deaf girl named Daisy. Madhav, Esha's boyfriend, is a police inspector who believes that Gopal's company, Golden Fisheries, secretly does drug-smuggling, does not get along with Gopal.

One night, while returning from his office, Gopal saves an attractive young woman named Meera from some dreadful goons. Due to circumstances, both of them decide to stay the night at Gopal's friend's yacht. When he arrives home the next day, an over-suspicious Ekta suspects Gopal of flirting around with his female employees and having an affair with his secretary. Knowing how difficult it is to convince her with the truth, he invents a story about spending the night with a fictitious friend named Anthony Gonsalves. Ekta becomes suspicious and does not believe his story as she knows that he never had a friend by that name, and hence, she decides to write to Anthony to visit him and to confirm Gopal was telling the truth.

Later, Gopal meets Laxman Prasad, who has come to interview for a position in his office. He is Meera's boyfriend, which is not known to Gopal. Gopal asks him to pretend to be Anthony, and meet and convince Ekta that he was indeed telling the truth, in return for a job. Laxman agrees to do so, and everything goes according to plan until the address on which Ekta had written a letter to Anthony as well as his name turns out to be real. Anthony and his wife, Julie, mistake the letter for a love letter, and Julie arrives at Ekta's house to complain, believing she and Anthony are having an affair. The real Anthony then later shows up at Gopal's house with intention of sleeping with Ekta, but he is scared off in a comical way by Gopal, Lucky and Laxman. Gopal warns the real Anthony not to show up around his residence ever again. However, Ekta and Esha spot Laxman with Meera while shopping and interrogate the real Anthony.

Meanwhile, Gopal finds out that a dead body was found at the same location where he saved Meera from the goons. Madhav finds out that Gopal was missing from his home that very night and that the dead person was Gopal's colleague Subodh whom he had threatened to kill over a spat. Madhav also easily guesses that Laxman is not the real Anthony and arrests him during his wedding with Meera, and phones Ekta about the truth. He gives Gopal a three-day deadline to get the girl to the police station to prove that Gopal had been with her and did not murder his employee. After three days and a lot of attempts, they still are not able to find the girl. In panic, Laxman and Lucky hire a woman called Munni, who needs money to get her boyfriend Vasooli out of jail, but Munni is kidnapped by the murderer. Unable to prove his innocence, Gopal is arrested.

Lucky and Laxman are chased by the cops but they are rescued by Meera, who questions Laxman about his involvement in some shady activities. Laxman then reveals that he had to cover up that night's incident for Gopal, whereas Meera reveals that she was the girl whom Gopal saved that night. Laxman is shocked and distraught over this news as he believes that Gopal and her are having an affair behind his back but Meera gets angry at Laxman for not trusting her. He apologizes and the trio go to the police station. However, Vasooli finds out that Munni has been kidnapped and kidnaps Meera as leverage in anger.

Gopal is later bailed out by Sawant, who is going along with him to the Lover's Point, with Madhav, Esha, Lucky and Laxman following them in pursuit, and Ekta, Vasooli and Meera arriving later. Munni is found tied up in the back of the murderer's jeep and is freed by the group. Gopal learns that this was a plot concocted by Sawant to frame him for the murder, as the latter's illegal drug trade was about to be exposed, confirming Madhav's suspicions. Sawant forces him to hang from the Lover's Point's noose until the others interfere. The drama grows, as everyone attempts suicide (except Madhav and Lucky), much to Sawant's anger, until he is driven crazy from this and tries to kill himself.

Ekta and Gopal get back together, Madhav and Gopal also shake hands in the end. Lucky, meanwhile, marries Daisy, who happens to be the daughter of the president of Gopal's company, and becomes the new boss, giving a shock to the others. Gopal and Laxman are declared the junior bosses, while Madhav is declared a 24-hour guard for Lucky, much to the three's chagrin, who sarcastically comment about Lucky's luck in the ending of this film and the previous one and joke that Lucky will not appear in the third film; Lucky, angered, breaks character and pulls the director of the film, Rohit Shetty, to defend him.

== Cast ==
- Ajay Devgn as Gopal Kumar Santoshi
- Arshad Warsi as Inspector Madhav Singh Ghai
- Tusshar Kapoor as Lucky Gill
- Shreyas Talpade as Laxman Prasad / Anthony Gonsalves (fake)
- Kareena Kapoor as Ekta Gill Santoshi
- Murali Sharma as Vinay Sawant
- Amrita Arora as Esha Santoshi Ghai
- Celina Jaitly as Meera Iyer
- Ashwini Kalsekar as Munni Devi
- Anjana Sukhani as Daisy Pachisia
- Sajid Samji as Constable Pinky
- Mukesh Tiwari as Vasooli
- Sharat Saxena as Babloo Pachisia
- Vrajesh Hirjee as Anthony Gonsalves (real) / Aatmaram
- Rakhee Tandon as Julie Gonsalves
- Sanjay Mishra as Subodh Mehra
- Shereveer Vakil as Vinay's aide
- Robin Bhatt as Gopal's neighbor
- Preeti Bhutani as Jigna, a female employee in Golden Fisheries
- Upasana Singh as Lucky's customer
- Sharman Joshi as Laxman Prasad (archive footage in photo)
- Siddharth Jadhav as Lucky's assistant
- Ashish R. Mohan as Hiren
- Gulshan Sharma
- Ram Kapoor as Jai Walia (cameo appearance)

== Production ==
Ajay Devgn is paired opposite Kareena Kapoor. Amongst the rest of the multi-starrer cast, actress Amrita Arora is the love interest of Arshad Warsi whilst Celina Jaitly and Anjana Sukhani are paired opposite Shreyas Talpade and Tusshar Kapoor, respectively.

Originally expected to commence shooting for the film in Dubai on a forty-day schedule, the cast shot for the film in Goa on a twenty-day schedule. Shooting later continued in places like the Filmistan Studios in Mumbai, South Africa and Bangkok.

== Music ==
Golmaal Returns

Soundtrack album by Pritam Chakraborty
- Released: 24 September 2008
- Genre: Bollywood film soundtrack
- Label: T-Series
- Producer: Pritam Chakraborty

Pritam Chakraborty chronology
Kidnap (2008)	Golmaal Returns (2008)	Billu (2009)

The soundtrack was released on 24 September 2008 by director Rohit Shetty and actors Ajay Devgn, Tusshar Kapoor & Shreyas Talpade on the musical show Sa Re Ga Ma Pa Challenge 2009. While the film's soundtrack contains six new songs composed by Pritam Chakraborty for the sequel, the album also consists of songs from the first film. Lyrics have been penned by Sameer.

The music video of the song "Tha Kar Ke" cost ₹3.5 crore, making it the most expensive Bollywood music video up until that time. Its choreography and picturisation was reportedly inspired by the Sivaji song "Athiradee".

Joginder Tuteja from IndiaFM gave the film's soundtrack 3 out of 5 stars and noted, that "Golmaal Returns is yet another winner from Pritam who delivers what is expected from a soundtrack for a film belonging to action-comedy genre. No one attempts to do anything exceptional or different from routine but walk the path which has been successful in the months gone by. The music may not go the Race (2008) way but does well enough to ensure immense awareness about the film due to its fast paced approach." According to the Indian trade website Box Office India, with around 14,00,000 units sold, this film's soundtrack album was the year's tenth highest-selling.

Track #	Song	Singer(s)	Duration	Composer
1	"Tha Kar Ke"	Neeraj Shridhar, Anwesha Datta Gupta, Akriti Kakkar, Earl, Indie	4:24	Pritam Chakraborty
2	"Vacancy"	Neeraj Shridhar, Benny Dayal, Suhail Kaul, Suzanne D'Mello	5:04	Pritam Chakraborty
3	"Tu Saala"	Anushka Manchanda	3:27	Pritam Chakraborty
4	"Meow"	Monali Thakur, Suzanne D'Mello	4:24	Pritam Chakraborty
5	"Meow" (English version)	Suzanne D'Mello	4:22	Pritam Chakraborty
6	"Vacancy" (Kilogram Mix)	Neeraj Shridhar, Benny Dayal, Suhail Kaul, Suzanne D'Mello	4:49	Pritam Chakraborty
7	"Tha Kar Ke" (Remix)	Neeraj Shridhar, Anwesha Datta Gupta, Akriti Kakkar, Earl, Indie	4:26	Pritam Chakraborty
8	"Meow" (Remix)	Monali Thakur, Suzanne D'Mello	4:54	Pritam Chakraborty
9	"Tu Saala" (Remix)	Anushka Manchanda	2:46	Pritam Chakraborty

== Release and reception ==
=== Box office ===
Golmaal Returns was considered financially successful. It grossed between ₹420–450 million in the first five days.

Critical reception

On the review aggregator website Rotten Tomatoes, 0% of 6 critics' reviews are positive, with an average rating of 3.7/10.

=== Home media ===
The film was released on DVD on 10 December 2010. The release included a single disc edition with the film and special features being the making of the film, and three songs: "Golmaal Remix", "Meeoow", and "Tu Saala". On the Moser Baer release, it is one disc plus a bonus disc of Golmaal.

== Controversies ==
In 2008, Shakuntala Bhatia, wife of director Rajendra Bhatia filed a complaint against Shree Asthavinayak Cine Vision Ltd., accusing them of directly copying the story of her husband's film Aaj Ki Taaza Khabar (1973).

== Sequel ==
A sequel Golmaal 3 was released in 2010.
