= Sajid Samji =

Screenwriter

- Born: 20 August 1967 (age 58); Mumbai, Maharashtra, India
- Occupations: Film director writer composer
- Years active: 1987–present
- Relatives: Farhad Samji (brother); Shazia Samji (daughter); Almeera Jiwa (cousin); Imran Amed (cousin)

Sajid Samji (born 20 August 1967) is an Indian writer, composer and film director. He is the brother of composer Farhad Samji and a member of the duo Sajid-Farhad.

== Career ==
He started his career with Tere Pyaar Mein as dialogue writer since then worked on more than 24 films including many Bollywood blockbusters.

== Filmography ==
=== As director ===
Year	Film
2016	Housefull 3
2014	Entertainment

=== As writer ===
Year	Film	Notes
2010	Golmaal 3	(dialogue)
2018	Simmba	(screenplay)
2019	Singham	(dialogue)

=== As lyricist ===
Year	Film	Song	Notes
2015	Tevar	"Superman"	
2008	Sunday	"Sunday "	

== Awards and nominations ==
- Nominated for Producers Guild Film Awards for Writing Dialogue for the movie Singham
