= Ashwini Kalsekar =

Indian film actress

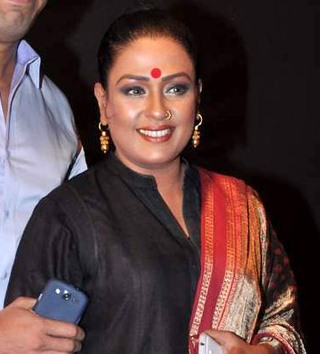
- Kalsekar in 2013
- Born: 22 January 1970 (age 56); Mumbai, Maharashtra, India
- Education: Bachelor of Arts
- Occupation: Actress
- Years active: 1991–present
- Notable work: Kasamh Se; Jodha Akbar
- Spouse(s): Nitesh Pandey (m. 1998; div. 2002) Murali Sharma (m. 2009)

Ashwini Kalsekar is an Indian actress who works predominantly in the Marathi and Hindi television and film industry.

She has primarily worked with Sriram Raghavan, Rohit Shetty, Ram Gopal Varma and Ekta Kapoor. After playing a cop in the popular TV show CID, Kalsekar had her first lead role on television in Zee TV's 1999 series Mr. Gayab. She had rose to fame with negative characters in Kasamh Se, Afsar Bitiya, Jodha Akbar, Itna Karo Na Mujhe Pyaar and Kavach. She also featured as a judge in the Marathi reality show "Fu bai fu" in 2011.

Kalsekar debuted in Tollywood like her husband Murali Sharma with Badrinath. Since 2019, she focused on OTT with Zee5's series "Chargesheet: The Shuttlecock Murder", in the MX Player web series "Cheesecake" as Chaaru, an animal communicator, which premiered in December 2019, in 36 Farmhouse on Zee5 and in the Hotstar Specials show Rudra: The Edge of Darkness.

== Early life ==
Ashwini Kalsekar was born into a Marathi family in Mumbai, Maharashtra. Her father Anil Kalsekar was a bank employee. Ashwini completed her B.A. from Mumbai and graduated in 1991. She pursued theatre from 1991 to 1994 after her studies. From 1992 to 1993, she was studying under actress Neena Gupta to pursue her dream to become an actress. She also trained under Muzammeel Vakil, a theatre acting coach, from 1992 to 1995. Ashwini is also a trained Kathak dancer.

== Personal life ==
Ashwini married Nitesh Pandey in 1998. They were divorced in 2002 due to undisclosed reasons. In 2009, she married film and television actor Murali Sharma.

== Career ==
In an interview to The Indian Express, she said that Shanti was her first acting project. She then worked in successful television serials such as CID, Anjaane, Siddhant and K. Street Pali Hill.

In 1990, Ashwini first appeared in the Odia film Paradeshi Chadhei. Ashwini performed in the Marathi film Tula Jhapar La (1996). Supporting roles would follow in Marathi films.

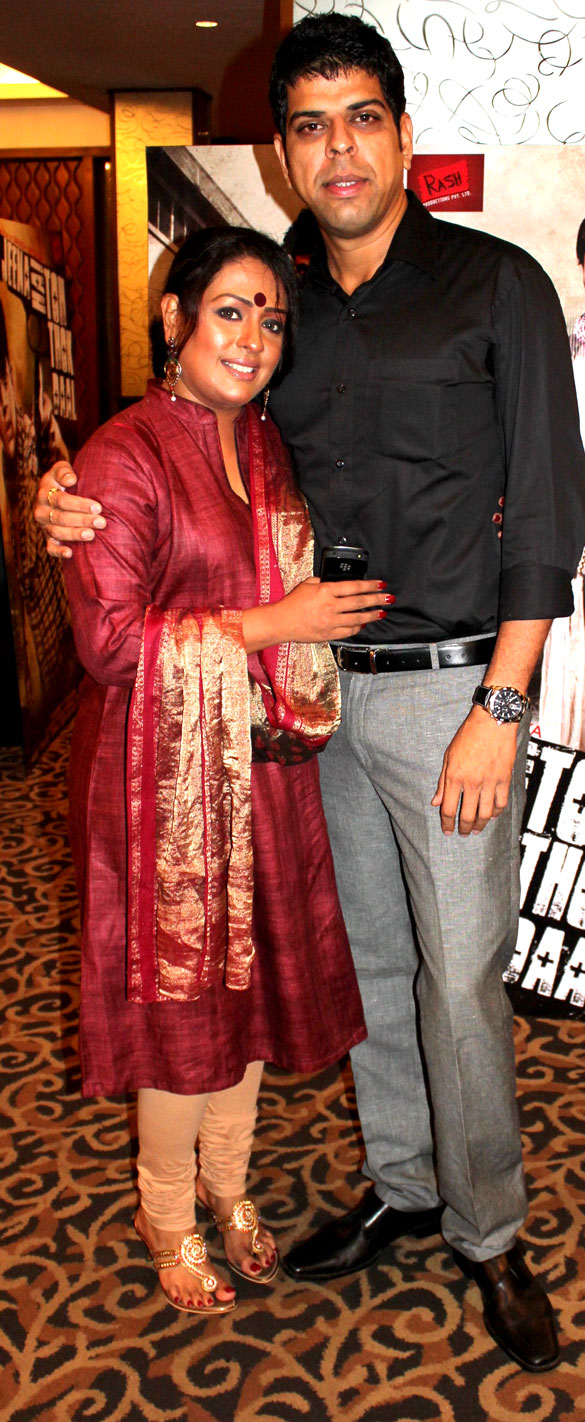
Ashwini Kalsekar with husband Murali Sharma at the studio release of Kalsekar's film Jeena Hai Toh Thok Daal

(2012).

Ekta Kapoor provided significant breaks to appear in the soap opera Kasamh Se as the antagonist Jigyasa Walia, receiving the Indian Television Academy Award for Best Actress in a Negative Role, the Indian Telly Award for Best Actress in a Negative Role, and other major awards.

In 2012, Ashwini was again approached by Ekta Kapoor to play the role of Maham Anga, a foster mother of Emperor Akbar in her historical drama series Jodha Akbar. The role fetched her critical acclaim and major awards. She would receive the 2014 Indian Telly Award for Best Actress in a Negative Role, the Boroplus Gold Award for Best Actress in a Negative Role, and other major awards.

In 2012, she was a part of a Marathi comedy reality show, Fu Bai Fu for 2 seasons, on a panel of judges, along with Swapnil Joshi and Sanjay Jadhav.

In 2014, Ashwini performed the role of Pam Khanna in Ekta Kapoor's soap opera Itna Karo Na Mujhe Pyaar.

== Filmography ==
Key
†	Denotes films that have not yet been released

=== Films ===
Year	Film	Role	Notes
1990	Paradeshi Chadhei	Manasi (Maani), Sujan Choudhury's love interest, Choudhury family's neighbour	Odia film
1996	Tula Jhapar La		Marathi film
2003	The Hero: Love Story of a Spy	Intelligence officer Nilima under Major Arun Khanna	
2004	Khakee	Kamlesh's wife	
2004	Musafir	Angela	
2005	Kisna	Rita	
2005	Aashiq Banaya Aapne	Police Officer	
2005	Apaharan	Anwar's wife	
2006	Ankahee	Mrs. Shilpa Mehta	
2007	Speed	Pam	
2007	Johnny Gaddaar	Varsha	
2008	Golmaal Returns	Munni	
2008	Phoonk	Madhu	
2009	Mere Khwabon Mein Jo Aaye	Mrs. Kapoor	
2009	All the Best: Fun Begins	Mary	
2009	Ek Tho Chance		
2009	Sumbaran		Marathi film
2010	Phoonk 2	Madhu	
2010	Rakta Charitra	Inspector Ashwini	
2010	Golmaal 3	Chintu	
2011	Badrinath	Sarkar's wife	Tollywood debut
2012	Nippu	Raja Goud's wife	Telugu film
2013	Dehraadun Diary		
2014	Singham Returns	TV journalist Meera Shori	
2014	Poshter Boyz	Head of Health Department	Marathi film
2015	Rahasya	Remi Fernandes	She is Ayesha's real mother
2015	Badlapur	Detective Joshi	
2016	Dongri Ka Raja	Raja's mother	
2017	Golmaal Again	Damini	
2017	Baghtos Kay Mujra Kar		Marathi film
2018	Mehbooba	Muntaz	Telugu film
2018	Andhadhun	Rasika Jawanda	
2018	Simmba	Judge Mrs. Smita Parulkar	
2019	Wedding Cha Shinema	Dr. Anagha Pradhan	Marathi film
2020	Laxmii	Ashwini	
2021	Koi Jaane Na	Police Officer	
2022	36 Farmhouse	Benny	
2022	Bhool Bhulaiyaa 2	Panditayeen	
2022	Cirkus	Shakuntala Devi	
2023	Daak		Marathi film
2024	Merry Christmas	Scarlett	Hindi/Tamil; Tamil debut
2024	Monkey Man	Queenie Kapoor	English film; International debut
2024	Vicky Vidya Ka Woh Wala Video	Bulbul Didi	
2024	Bhool Bhulaiyaa 3	Panditayeen	
2024	Vanvaas	Rampatiya Mausi	
2025	Son of Sardaar 2	Premlata	
2026	Manjar		Marathi film

=== Television ===
Year	Show	Role	Notes
1995–1997	Shanti	Shasha	
1997	Farz		
1997	Ek Aur Mahabharat	Draupadi	
1997	Ghar Jamai	Rohini Amma	Guest
1997	Aahat	Police Inspector Smita	Episode 86, 87 Asli Yaa Naqli
1998–2004	CID	Inspector Asha	Supporting role
1998	Ji Sahab	Doctor	Special appearance
1999	Naya Zamana	Kiran Indrayani	
1999	Mr. Gaayab12	Nisha	Lead role
2001–2002	Anjaane		
2002–2003	Achanak 37 Saal Baad	Malini	
2002-2004	Kittie Party	Natassha	
2004	Siddhanth	ACP Netra Menon	
2006; 2007–2009	Kasamh Se	Jigyaasa Walia Bali	Main Antagonist
2007	Jeete Hai Jiske Liye	Adira Dhanrajgir	
2007–2008	Virrudh	Devyani	
2007-2008	Parrivaar	Manorma	Supporting role
2010	Jhansi Ki Rani	Heera Bai	
2010	Ganga Kii Dheej	Maha Mai	
2011	Hitler Didi	Rani Bhatija	Guest
2012	Afsar Bitiya	Sikka Thakurayin	
2013	Fu Bai Fu	Judge	Marathi comedy show
2013–2014	Jodha Akbar	Maham Anga	Antagonist
2014–2015	Itna Karo Na Mujhe Pyaar	Poonam Khanna	
2016	Adaalat (season 2)		
2016	Kavach... Kaali Shaktiyon Se	Saudaamini (pisachini)	
2017	Partners Trouble Ho Gayi Double	Neena Nadkarni	Supporting role

=== Web series ===
Year	Title	Role	Platform	Notes
2019	Booo Sabki Phategi	Amma	ALTBalaji	Digital debut
2019	Hutatma		ZEE5	
2020	The Chargesheet: Innocent or Guilty?	Abha Abhyankar	ZEE5	
2022	Rudra: The Edge of Darkness	Commissioner Deepali Handa	Disney+ Hotstar	
2023	Pop Kaun?	Satwant Kaur	Disney+ Hotstar	
2026	Psycho Saiyaan	Ratna Singh	MX Player	Special Appearance

== Awards ==
Year	Award	Category	For	Result	Ref(s)
2006	6th Indian Telly Awards	Best Actress in Negative Role	Kasamh Se	Won	
2007	7th Indian Television Academy Awards	Best Actress in Negative Role	Kasamh Se	Won	
2014	13th Indian Telly Awards	Best Actress in Negative Role	Jodha Akbar	Won	
2014	7th Boroplus Gold Awards	Best Actress in Negative Role (Critics)	Jodha Akbar	Won	

== See also ==
- List of Hindi television actresses
- List of Indian television actresses
