= Acid Factory =

- Theatrical release poster
- Directed by: Suparn Verma
- Screenplay by: Sanjay Gupta; Suparn Verma
- Story by: Milind Gadagkar
- Based on: Unknown by Simon Brand
- Produced by: Sanjay Gupta
- Starring: Fardeen Khan; Irrfan Khan; Manoj Bajpayee; Dino Morea; Aftab Shivdasani; Dia Mirza; Danny Denzongpa
- Cinematography: Sahil Kapoor
- Edited by: Hemal Kothari
- Music by: Songs: Shamir Tandon; Manasi Scott; Gourov Dasgupta; Bappa Lahiri; Ranjit Barot; Score: Amar Mohile
- Production companies: White Feather Films; Mumbai Mantra
- Distributed by: Mumbai Mantra
- Release date: 9 October 2009
- Running time: 105 minutes
- Country: India
- Language: Hindi
- Budget: ₹21 crore
- Box office: ₹5.20 crore

Acid Factory is a 2009 Indian Hindi-language action thriller film directed by Suparn Verma. The film stars Fardeen Khan, Irrfan Khan, Manoj Bajpayee, Dino Morea, Aftab Shivdasani, Dia Mirza, and Danny Denzongpa. The film is an unofficial adaptation of the 2006 American film Unknown.

== Plot ==
Five men wake up inside a factory to find themselves locked. It is revealed that two of the men trapped have been kidnapped and held hostage by the other three for a planned heist. However, they themselves do not know who the hostages and kidnappers are. They receive a phone call from Kaiser, the leader of the gang, who informs them that he is on the way with ransom money and plans to tip off the hostages once he arrives. They try to escape but fail, causing them to lunge at one another in despair.

Sarthak regains his memory and realizes that he is one of the hostages and that JD is the other hostage, as they were both kidnapped. He informs JD that both of them are going to be killed. JD, however, is unaware, as he has no memory of the incident.

Max regains her memory and is revealed to be Kaiser's girlfriend. In addition, the gang members are revealed to be Om, Sultan, and Romeo. Once Kaiser arrives at the factory, Sultan regains his memories and discovers that JD and Sarthak were once business partners. Sarthak planned on selling the company, which was the reason for his kidnapping.

Kaiser gives Sarthak an opportunity to free himself by killing JD. Sarthak is tasked with killing Sultan by JD; however, he tries to get Romeo to kill him instead. Romeo escorts Sarthak to the balcony of the factory and fires his gun, making the gang believe that Sarthak is dead. However, they realize that Romeo is an undercover police officer assigned to capture the gang. A shootout occurs in the factory, where Sarthak finds two gas masks and hands one to Romeo. They fire at the tank, causing an explosion. Romeo and Sarthak escape the factory and find the police waiting outside to arrest the gang.

== Cast ==
- Fardeen Khan as Romeo, an undercover cop who infiltrates Kaiser's gang to bring it down
- Irrfan Khan as Kaiser, the leader of the gang
- Aftab Shivdasani as Sarthak Sanghvi, a rich business tycoon and JD's friend
- Dino Morea as J. D, a rich businessman and Sarthak's friend who is revealed to be one of Kaiser's accomplices
- Dia Mirza as Max, Kaiser's girlfriend and accomplice
- Manoj Bajpayee as Sultan, Kaiser's accomplice
- Danny Denzongpa as Om, Kaiser's accomplice
- Gulshan Grover as ACP Ranbir Singh
- Shabana Raza as Nandini S. Sanghvi, Sarthak's wife
- Manasi Scott as a dancer in the song "Khatti Meethi" (special appearance)

== Soundtrack ==
The soundtrack is composed by Bappa Lahiri, Manasi Scott, Gourov Dasgupta, Ranjit Barot and Shamir Tandon.

Acid Factory

Soundtrack album by Bappa Lahiri Shamir Tandon Manasi Scott Gourov Dasgupta Ranjit Barot
- Released: 2009
- Genre: Film soundtrack
- Language: Hindi
- Label: Junglee Music

No.	Title	Lyrics	Music	Singer(s):	Length
1.	"Yeh Jism"	Virag Mishra	Shamir Tandon	Anchal Datta Bhatia, Raaj Gopal Iyer
2.	"Khatti Meethi"	Manasi Scott, Amitabh Bhattacharya	Manasi Scott	Manasi Scott
3.	"Jab Andhera Hota Hai"	Shellee	Gourov Dasgupta	Anchal Datta Bhatia, Saptak Bhattacharjee, Shweta Vijay
4.	"Kone Kone Mein"	Virag Mishra	Bappa Lahiri	Vasundhara Das
5.	"Raftaar"	Virag Mishra	Shamir Tandon	Anchal Datta Bhatia, Raaj Gopal Iyer
6.	"Yeh Jism - Club Remix"	Virag Mishra	Bappa Lahiri	Anchal Datta Bhatia, Raaj Gopal Iyer
7.	"Kone Kone Mein - Lounge Kilogram Mix"	Virag Mishra	Bappa Lahiri	Vasundhara Das
8.	"Jab Andhera Hota Hai - Remix"	Shellee	Gourov Dasgupta	Anchal Datta Bhatia
9.	"Nothing Else Will Do"	Virag Mishra	Ranjit Barot	Ranjit Barot

== Plagiarism accusations ==
When questioned about similarities with the 2006 American film Unknown, Verma claimed he did not know whether it was a rip off or not. According to him, the writer came up with the story three years before it appealed to him and he decided to direct it. He remained unfazed by its being a remake or not.

Simon Brand, who directed the original film, was shocked when he learned about Acid Factory through an Indian journalist in Los Angeles. Brand spoke to members of the industry who knew the subject and they told him it was difficult to sue the makers for plagiarism since the film had already been released in the United States, which was a common practice in India. Brand claimed to feeling enormous helplessness and frustration at not being credited for an unauthorized remake shot with four or five times more budget than his film.

== Critical reception ==
Taran Adarsh from Bollywood Hungama gave the film 3 stars out of 5, calling it "a well-crafted, well executed film with the ensemble cast pitching in competent performances" while also praising the cinematography, sound design and action sequences. The Times of India gave the film 3 out of 5 stars and called it a sufficiently engaging film that could have broke new ground.
