= Sunday (2008 film) =

2008 Indian film by Rohit Shetty

- Movie poster for Sunday
- Directed by: Rohit Shetty
- Written by: K. Subash; Tushar Hiranandani; Robin Bhatt; Sajid-Farhad (dialogues); Chandra Sekhar Yeleti
- Based on: Anukokunda Oka Roju by Chandra Sekhar Yeleti
- Produced by: Kumar Mangat Pathak; Sunil Lulla
- Starring: Ajay Devgn; Ayesha Takia; Arshad Warsi; Irrfan Khan
- Cinematography: Aseem Bajaj
- Edited by: Steven H. Bernard
- Music by: Songs: Sandeep Chowta; Shibani Kashyap; Daler Mehndi; Raghav Sachar; M.Ali & Kami (Suroor - Pakistan Band); Amar Mohile; Background Score: Sanjoy Chowdhury
- Production company: Big Screen Entertainment
- Distributed by: Eros International
- Release date: 25 January 2008
- Running time: 130 minutes
- Country: India
- Language: Hindi

Sunday is a 2008 Indian Hindi-language mystery comedy film directed by Rohit Shetty. The film stars Ajay Devgan, Ayesha Takia, Arshad Warsi and Irrfan Khan. It is a remake of the 2005 Telugu film Anukokunda Oka Roju.

== Plot ==
In the city of Delhi, a girl is murdered by an unseen killer. It is learnt that the killer was her fiance and had acquired evidence about her infidelity. Then, the story shifts to the life of Sehar, a voiceover artist. Sehar, who lives alone in a flat, has a friend named Ritu, who is a fashion designer. Sehar has a rare disorder - her memory blanks out, leaving her clueless about events that took place in a certain time period. Hence, she rarely socialises. But Ritu forcefully takes her to a nightclub.

Sehar had previously met Assistant Commissioner of Police Rajveer Randhawa, a corrupt cop. Unknown to both, their mothers are old friends and want them to get married. Sehar has rejected Rajveer after knowing his truth, but he is smitten. Here, Sehar wakes up in her flat, and apparently nothing wrong has happened. But she soon learns that she has missed one whole day and she is being followed by a stranger. She runs into two characters, Ballu, a taxi driver asking her a trip fare about which she knows nothing, and Kumar Mangat, a wannabe actor who mistakes her for a ghost.

The plot thickens when Sehar hears some suspicious messages on her answering machine, making her realise that something sinister has happened during the missing Sunday, the day she recalls nothing about. Rajveer comes to rescue, but he comes to the same conclusion as hers. Tests show that Sehar was roofied - most probably in the nightclub, causing the whole problem. Ballu & Kumar turn out to be red herrings.

Rajveer finds the boys who roofied Sehar, but nothing concrete is found. Just as he is about to accept that Sehar might have killed someone, Sehar is attacked by some goons. The goons fail to kill her, but Rajveer realises that Sehar might have witnessed a murder. After reconstructing the events at the night out with Ritu, Rajveer finds out that Ballu had left her near a place where a youth was murdered.

Rajveer realises the implications and sets a trap for the goons. With the help of Ballu and Kumar, the goons are finally nabbed, and Rajveer learns the truth. He arrests Amit, the son of minister Raj Khurana, for a double murder. An enraged Raj demands an explanation. It is revealed that the girl murdered earlier was killed by Amit. After killing her, he waited for a few days before killing his own friend, with whom the girl was cheating on him. Unfortunately, Sehar was left nearby by Ballu. Amit assumed that she saw the second murder; hence, he sent the goons to kill her.

Amit protests until brought face to face with the goons. Raj has Amit arrested. With Sehar safe, the people are still clueless about Sehar's stalker - until the stalker shows himself. He reveals himself to be a taxi driver. It is revealed that after Khurana's son had seen Sehar, it was this taxi driver who saw Sehar. He realised that she was drugged and managed to get her back to her flat after finding her address. With this final mystery solved, Kumar narrates what happened with everybody: Rajveer and Sehar got married, Ballu now owns a car company, owning hundreds of cars and trucks, and Kumar has become a Bhojpuri superstar, showing that the story ended on a happy note.

== Cast ==
- Ajay Devgan as ACP Rajveer Randhava
- Ayesha Takia as Sehar Thapar
- Arshad Warsi as Ballu
- Irrfan Khan as Kumar Mangat; the character shares his name with the film's producer
- Mukesh Tiwari as Inspector Anwar Rehman
- Vrajesh Hirjee as Chakki - Martial Arts Instructor
- Murli Sharma as the mysterious stalker
- Anjana Sukhani as Ritu Hirani
- Ali Asgar as Amit Khurana
- Deepak Qazir as Raj Khurana
- Manoj Chandila as Sanjay
- Shereveer Vakil as Aseem Bajaj
- Tusshar Kapoor Special appearance in song "Manzar"
- Esha Deol Special appearance in song "Kashmakash"
- Robin Bhatt as Dr. Robin Bhatt
- Farid Amiri as Pardunam 'P.O.K.' Om Kumar
- Gulshan Rana as Vatsal Seth
- Ravi Gossain as Hiren Shetty
- Swapnil Kotriwar as Journalist
- Sajid Samji as Pinky

== Production ==
The shooting began from 10 March 2007, the first few days of shooting happened in Mumbai and then a 30 days schedule in Delhi from 18 March. The second and last schedule started from 22 May 2007 in Delhi and then continued in Mumbai and later in Hyderabad. Lastly, a song was shot in Australia and the shooting was completed by 13 July 2007.

The film was shot at popular places in India like Pragati Maidan, Lal Qila, India Gate, Connaught Place.

== Soundtrack ==
Song	Singer(s)	Duration	Music	Lyrics	Picturised on
Missing Sunday	Mahua Kamat, Earl Edgar	3:54	Sandeep Chowta	Sajid-Farhad	Ayesha Takia, Ajay Devgan, Arshad Warsi, Irrfan Khan, Anjana Sukhani
Pyar To Hona Hi Hai	Kamran Bari, Mohammad Ali (Suroor Band)	4:53	Suroor Band	Kamran Bari	Ajay Devgan, Ayesha Takia
Loot Liya	Daler Mehndi, Sunidhi Chauhan	4:41	Daler Mehndi	Sajid-Farhad, Daler Mehndi	Ayesha Takia, Irrfan Khan, Arshad Warsi
Kashmakash	Shibani Kashyap	5:31	Shibani Kashyap	Virag Mishra	Esha Deol
Manzar	Raghav Sachar	3:50	Raghav Sachar	Sajid-Farhad	Ayesha Takia, Anjana Sukhani, Tusshar Kapoor
Sunday Theme	Joy-Clint	3:50	Amar Mohile	Joy	

== Reception ==
Taran Adarsh of Bollywood Hungama gave the film 3.5 out of 5, writing, "On the whole, SUNDAY is a well-made entertainer that has the potential to click with moviegoers."

Conversely, Sukanya Verma of Rediff.com gave the film 2.5 out of 5, writing, "Contrary to Shetty's hit comedy, Golmaal which was consistently funny, Sunday entertains as long as it tries to be funny but isn't sly enough to find a mention in the archive of whodunits."
