= All the Best: Fun Begins =

2009 Indian film by Rohit Shetty

All The Best: Fun Begins
- Theatrical release poster
- Directed by: Rohit Shetty
- Written by: Screenplay: Robin Bhatt; Yunus Sajawal; Dialogues: Farhad-Sajid; Bunty Rathore
- Based on: Right Bed, Wrong Husband by Neil E. Schaffner
- Produced by: Ajay Devgn
- Starring: Sanjay Dutt; Ajay Devgn; Fardeen Khan; Bipasha Basu; Mugdha Godse
- Cinematography: Dudley
- Edited by: Steven H. Bernard
- Music by: Songs: Pritam; Background Score: Sanjoy Chowdhury
- Production companies: Kinesis Films; Ajay Devgn FFilms
- Distributed by: Yash Raj Films
- Release date: 16 October 2009
- Running time: 141 minutes
- Country: India
- Language: Hindi
- Budget: ₹41 crore
- Box office: ₹61 crore

All The Best: Fun Begins is a 2009 Indian Hindi-language action comedy film directed by Rohit Shetty and produced by Ajay Devgn. An official adaptation of the English comedy play Right Bed, Wrong Husband published by Samuel French, Inc., it stars Ajay Devgn, Sanjay Dutt, Fardeen Khan, Bipasha Basu, Johny Lever, Sanjay Mishra and Mugdha Godse.

The film opened theatrically on 16 October 2009, coinciding with Diwali, and was successful at the box office. It was subsequently remade with slight changes in the story in Malayalam in 2010 as Best of Luck which went on to be remade in Kannada in 2015 as Ond Chance Kodi.

== Plot ==
Veer Kapoor is a struggling artist who hopes to make it big someday with his rock group, but at present, he is tottering financially. His only source of income is a monthly pocket money of Rs 100,000 from his wealthy elder stepbrother Dharam, for which Veer has told a lie about him being married to Vidya, his girlfriend. His best friend is Prem Chopra, who is married to Jhanvi and had come up with the idea of Veer lying to Dharam about his relationship. Jhanvi runs a broken-down gymnasium owned by Prem's family, and Prem spends his time mechanically modifying cars.

Veer and Prem need Rs. 500,000 to register Prem's car for an illegal race (if they win, they will get Rs. 5,000,000). They borrow the money from a local mute loan shark, Tobu, after showing him a car designed by Prem, which Prem assures him he cannot lose. Impressed by this vehicle, Tobu, in addition to lending Prem and Veer 500,000, invested 500,000 of his own on Prem. Prem loses the race and ends up owing a sum of Rs. 1,000,000 to Tobu, which should be paid within a week.

Prem decides to rent out Veer's bungalow to a local slum dweller, RGV—Raghuvandas Goverdhandas Vakawale, who has won a lottery, and collects an advance of Rs 250,000. However, everything gets into a muddle when Dharam is stranded at the Goa Airport on his way to Lesotho and insists on catching up with his younger brother. Things get worse when their new tenant arrives and is beaten up by Dharam. In order to save the situation, Prem and Veer both lie that Raghu is mad and vice versa.

Vidya had a fight with Veer and is temporarily not talking to him. After Veer brings Dharam home from the airport, Dharam sees Jhanvi and takes her for Vidya, and later, when he sees Vidya, Prem and Veer tell him she is Jhanvi. Thus, Jhanvi has to pretend to be Vidya, and Vidya has to pretend to be Jhanvi. Both the young men aren't happy as Veer's brother's flight to Lesotho got delayed by a few days. Dharam decides to stay with his brother until further notice.

Prem sees Dharam's watch, a Rolex, and decides to finish their debt to Tobu by giving him the Rolex. Dharam occasionally flirts with Jhanvi (Vidya), which irks Prem. In a similar way, Prem pays off the debt now by giving Tobu Dharam's royal gift for the king of Lesotho that turns out to be pickles for the princess. Immediately after Prem comes back home, a frantic Jhanvi becomes unconscious and is rushed to the hospital by Prem. This is seen by Dharam, and he follows them to the hospital and slaps Prem for taking Jhanvi. The doctor informs Prem that Jhanvi is pregnant. Veer feels extremely guilty now because his brother thinks that Vidya and him are having a baby.

Veer decides that he will tell Dharam the truth, but before that, Dharam reveals that his flight to Lesotho has been booked. Before Dharam leaves, Tobu and his men barge into the house demanding the money. Dharam angrily slaps Tobu, curing the latter of his muteness in the process, and Dharam finds out the truth when Tobu reveals Veer and Prem's debt, which Tobu generously calls off, and gifts him the items Veer and Prem stole from Dharam out of gratitude not knowing he was the original owner, Raghu demands his rent money back, and Vidya's father arrives looking for her, with Dharam proceeding to angrily chase Prem for being the cause of everything that happened. The house is soon surrounded by thugs from Lesotho, who turn out to be the king's men. It is later revealed that Dharam and the princess had an affair, and now the princess is pregnant. The king's men want Dharam and the princess to get married. They accept, and it's a happy ending.

== Cast ==
- Sanjay Dutt as Dharam Kapoor
- Ajay Devgan as Prem Chopra
- Fardeen Khan as Veer
- Bipasha Basu in a dual role as
  - Jahnvi Chopra / fake Vidya
  - Gutoto, a Princess of Lesotho
- Mugdha Godse as Vidya / fake Jahnvi
- Ashwini Kalsekar as Mary, a Malayali maid
- Sanjay Mishra as Raghunandandas Govardhandas Vakawale a.k.a. "R.G.V."
- Johnny Lever as Tobu
- Vijay Patkar as Goli
- Mukesh Tiwari as Chautala, Dharam's secretary
- Asrani as Vidya's father
- Atul Parchure as Dhondu
- Shraddha Musale as Betty (keyboard player on Veer's band)
- Puneet Vashisht as Chris
- Mansi Jain as Richal (Cameo)

== Awards and nominations ==
Year	Nominee / work	Award	Result
2010	Sanjay Dutt	IIFA Award for Best Performance in a Comic Role	Won
2010	Ajay Devgn	Stardust Award for Best Actor in a Comedy or Romance	Won
2010	Ajay Devgn	Apsara Award Best Actor in a Comic Role	Won
2010	Bipasha Basu	Screen Award for Best Actress (Popular Choice)	Nominated

== Reception ==
Taran Adarsh from Bollywood Hungama gave the film 3.5 stars out of 5, and while critical of the music as well as the pacing in the second half, he praised the cinematography, dialogues and writing. Mayank Shekhar from Hindustan Times gave the film 3 stars out of 5, and felt that while the premise was pretty weak and nothing made sense, the film was bound to make the viewer crack up more than once in a while.

On the other hand, Sukanya Verma from Rediff.com gave the film 2.5 stars out of 5, remarking that it was the presence of Johnny Lever that made the film work sporadically.

=== Box office ===
The film had opened to an average start as it released with two other diwali releases that year but had later picked up due to positive word of mouth . It was rated as successful in India, and is the eighth highest grossing Bollywood film of 2009.

== Soundtrack ==
All the Best: Fun Begins

Soundtrack album by Pritam Chakraborty
- Released: 11 September 2009
- Genre: Bollywood film soundtrack
- Label: T-Series
- Producer: Pritam Chakraborty

Pritam Chakraborty chronology
Dil Bole Hadippa! (2009)	All the Best: Fun Begins (2009)	Ajab Prem Ki Ghazab Kahani (2009)

Released by T-Series, the soundtrack was composed by Pritam Chakraborty and the lyrics were penned by Kumaar.

=== Track listing ===
No.	Title	Performer(s)	Length
1.	"All The Best"	Soham Chakraborty, Rana Majumder, Antara Mitra	4:51
2.	"Dil Kare"	Suraj Jagan, Rupam Islam	5:04
3.	"Haan Main Jitni Martaba"	KK, Yashita Yashpal
4.	"Kyon"	Clinton Cerejo
5.	"You Are My Love"	Neeraj Shridhar, Kunal Ganjawala, Alisha Chinoy, Rajesh, Antra Mali	5:07
6.	"Dil Kare (Remix)"	Suraj Jagan, Rupam Islam	4:56
7.	"Haan Main Jitni Martaba (Remix)"	KK, Yashita Yashpal	4:29
