= Baby Come Naa =

Indian web series

- Genre: sitcom
- Created by: Paritosh Painter
- Developed by: Ekta Kapoor
- Screenplay by: Farhad Samji
- Story by: Paritosh Painter
- Directed by: Farhad Samji
- Creative director: Nimisha Pandey (ALTBalaji)
- Starring: see below
- Opening theme: Baby Come Naa by Babji Haque Meera
- Composer: Farhad Samji
- Country of origin: India
- Original language: Hindi
- No. of seasons: 1
- No. of episodes: 6

Production
- Producer: Paritosh Painter
- Production locations: Mumbai, India
- Editor: Sanjay Jaiswal
- Camera setup: Multi-camera
- Running time: 18-23 minutes
- Production company: Ideas the Entertainment Company

Original release
- Network: ALT Balaji
- Release: 2 November 2018

Baby Come Naa is a 2018 Hindi web comedy series created by Paritosh Painter for Ekta Kapoor's video on demand platform ALTBalaji. The series stars Shreyas Talpade as the protagonist. The series revolves around the protagonist who is connected with two women and his difficulties in managing both relationships, with the women kept unaware of each other.

The series is available for streaming on the ALT Balaji App and its associated websites since its release date.

== Plot ==
The comedy series revolves around the protagonist Aditya Tendulkar who is happy two-timing with two women, Sophie and Sarah, both claiming to be his wife. The series explores how Aditya ends up in difficult situations due to his relationships and how his friend Yoyo helps him to come out of the situation.

== Cast ==
- Shreyas Talpade as Aditya Tendulkar
- Chunky Pandey as Baburao Lele
- Kiku Sharda as Yoyo Bappi Singh
- Shefali Zariwala as Sarah
- Manasi Scott as Sophie
- Rajendra Chawla as Dara Singh
- Neetha Shetty as Mona
