= Aflatoon (2023 film) =

- Theatrical release poster
- Directed by: Paritosh Painter
- Written by: Paritosh Painter
- Produced by: Rajeev Kumar Saha
- Starring: Johny Lever; Siddharth Jadhav; Paritosh Painter
- Cinematography: Suresh Deshmane
- Music by: Kashyap Sompura
- Production companies: Saha & Sons Studios; Ideas The Entertainment Company
- Distributed by: AA Films
- Release date: 21 July 2023
- Country: India
- Language: Marathi
- Budget: est.₹3.50 crore (US$370,000)
- Box office: est.₹10.01 crore (US$1.1 million)

Aflatoon (transl. Maverick) is a 2023 Indian Marathi-language comedy film directed by Paritosh Painter and produced by Rajeev Kumar Saha. The film stars an ensemble cast including Siddhartha Jadhav, Paritosh Painter, Jayesh Thakkar, Johnny Lever, Bharat Dabholkar, Shweta Gulati, Tejaswini Lonari, Vijay Patkar, Resham Tipnis, Jesse Lever and Vishnu Mehra. Made on budget of just 3.5 crore film collects 10 crore and became Fourth grossing Marathi film of 2023.

== Plot ==
Shree, Aditya, and Manav are three friends who are blind, deaf, and dumb respectively. They are broke, with a long list of creditors behind their backs. To get rid of their financial problems, they decide to start a detective agency. Their first client is Maria, a young, beautiful, naive girl.

Shree, Aditya and Manav have to help Maria get back her ancestral property from a swindler, the builder Dsouza, who had conned her father out of the property. Maria informs Shree, Aditya, and Manav how Dsouza duped her Father and conned her to sign a "Sale Agreement" under the pretext of getting her to sign a "Rental Agreement".

Maria approaches police inspector Aaliya Sawant to help her with her case. But Aaliya advises Maria not to waste her time and money fighting the case, as all papers are legitimate. So with no option left, Maria gives the case to the trio, even though she has no faith in them.

Now the trio, with their special skills, devise a plan to get the ancestral property back. A Borrowed necklace, fake websites, antique statues, hidden treasure, multiple get-ups, and a down-and-out Maharaja are all are brought together by Shree, Aditya, and Manav to give it back to Dsouza in his own style.

== Cast ==
- Siddhartha Jadhav as Shree

Shree is blind but has a highly developed sense of smell and can tell apart up to ten different scents in the same place. He is part of the 3 Cheers detective agency with his friends Aditya and Manav, and is the group's main strategist. He is often at odds with Aditya.

- Paritosh Painter as Adi

Aditya is deaf and repeats whatever the others say without hearing. He has an eidetic memory and photographic vision. His sharp mind can remember 100 details from a single place or an event and also recollect them when needed. He is an over-smart, overconfident guy who always goes overboard with his antics. He is the part of 3 Cheers detective agency with his friends Shree and Manav. Though he is always at loggerheads with Shree! He communicates with his friend Manav through funny signs, gestures, and dumb charades.

- Jayesh Thakkar as Manav

Manav is dumb and cannot speak but is a nerd with information and technology center himself. Hacking and streaming gadgets are his qualities. He is the part of 3 Cheers detective agency with his friends Aditya and Shree! He communicates with his friend Manav thru funny signs, gestures, and dumb charades. He gives technical and information support for any case that comes to them.

- Shweta Gulati as Durdevi Maria

Maria is a sweet cute girl, who has been duped by her father's friend Ganesh D’souza to the amount of 10 crores. But she is a resilient and determined girl who will take revenge and not spare him. She hires the detectives Shree, Aditya, and Manav to investigate and get her money back and she herself joins their plan.

- Bharat Dabholkar as Mr. Ganesh D'souza

He is a scheming, cunning fraud who dupes people out of their money, property or even inheritance. He is an egomaniac and considers others fools and scapegoats for his evil plans. Though extremely smart he is also very greedy in nature and this act as his Achilles heel as when his greed supersedes his smartness he too gets trapped in his own game.

- Johnny Lever as Nawab Waajid Ali

The old Nawab with a shining white beard has his all prestige, respect, and heritage at stake because he is bankrupt and his show-off and the royalty is nothing but a fake pretense. He just has his loyal manager Kulkarni, a pile of debts, and on top of it his stepson Aftab who is blackmailing him for money. He enters the plan of Shree, Aditya, and Manav against D’souza to salvage his reputation and heritage.

- Vishnu Mehra as Kulkarni

He is the loyal manager of Nawab Waajid Ali who has been unpaid for months now and is a bit short-tempered.

- Jessy Lever as Aftaab

Waajid Ali's stepson and a good-for-nothing, useless chap who constantly blackmails his stepfather for money and is also very impolite and rude in his behavior with others.

- Tejaswini Lonari as Alia Sawant

The hot-looking lady inspector loves perfumes but is an honest and very strict cop who hates frauds and scammers. Her own father is Havaldar and working under her. She has an innate sense of sniffing out criminals and crime and is always after Shree, Aditya, and Manav who she thinks are up to something illegal and against the law.

- Vijay Patkar as Sawant

Aliya's father worked under her as a Havaldar. He is always concerned that his beautiful and hot-looking daughter attracts lots of unwanted attention. He too is honest but has to listen to his daughter as he is her subordinate.

- Resham Tipnis

== Release ==
=== Theatrical ===
Aflatoon was theatrically released on 21 July 2023.

== Production ==
It is the first film that features the real-life father-son duo Johnny Lever and Jesse Lever together. The entire film has been shot in India. It is produced by Saha & Sons Studios and Ideas The Entertainment Company.

Shooting Locations:

1. Nimbalkar Wada, Phaltan, Maharashtra
2. Four Seasons Winery's
3. Vasai Fort
4. Nanadmahal, Malkhed, Pune
5. Ellora Studios, Meera Road,
6. Goa
7. Apple Studios - VASAI
8. Amandi Bugalow - Mudh Island, Mumbai

== Reception ==
Anub George of The Times of India gave the film a positive review, describing the film as a "decent slapstick comedy" that is an "average film" but could be a "fun watch on a lazy Sunday afternoon." He praised the comedic performances of Siddharth Jadhav and Johnny Lever but criticized the lackluster performances of other actors and the repetitive nature of some gags.

== Soundtrack ==
The songs and background music are composed by Kashyap Sompura.

Track listing
No.	Title	Lyrics	Music	Singer(s)	Length
1.	"Aflatoon - Title Song"	Pancham Sompura	Kashyap Sompura	Earl Edgar; Sangharsh Mohite; Pancham Sompura	2:12
2.	"Maka Naka"	Mandar Cholkar	Kashyap Sompura	Avadhoot Gupte; Vaishali Samant	2:50
Total length:					5:02
