= Manasi Scott =

Indian singer, songwriter and actress

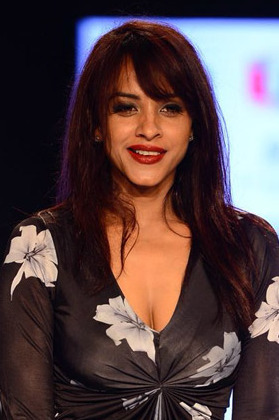
- Scott at the Bombay Times Fashion Week in 2018.
- Occupations: Singer, songwriter, actress
- Years active: 2006–present
- Spouse: Craig Scott (divorced in 2011)
- Children: Zephan Izeya

Manasi Scott is an Indian singer, songwriter, and an actress. Manasi is best known for her live performances and for composing "Khatti Meethi" for Sanjay Gupta's Acid Factory. In 2018, she played the female protagonist in ALTBalaji's web series Baby Come Naa as Sophie opposite Shreyas Talpade.

== Early life ==
Manasi is known as a multi talented personality. She made national level recognition as a singer while she was studying in eighth standard. After obtaining a degree in mass communications from the St. Xavier College, she also did a course on TV and Film production. She kick-started her professional singing career with the popular Pune rock band Dark Water Fixation, which also paved way to get her first break in Tamil composer Vidyasagar's Snehithiye. The song was "Othaiyadi Pathaile" and the film directed by Priyadarshan turned out to a box office hit. Manasi also played an important supporting role in the film and her character's name was Nancy. Snehithiye is a movie noted for having only female characters in the leads. Manasi also acted in the Malayalam film Raakilipattu, it is the Malayalam version of the Tamil film Snegithiye. In Raakilipattu, she acted with her original name Manasi as Jyothika's friend. Manasi is also a national basketball player.

== Career ==
Even before releasing her debut album, Manasi had already become a national sensation with her live performances. Even though she released her debut album "Nachlae" in 2005, her first major break happened in 2009 with the Sanjay Gupta film Acid Factory. Manasi composed and sang a song, "Khatti Meethi", for the film. She also filmed a music video for the same number. The video was voted the No.2 video of 2009 by MSN users. Her other major works are "Peter Gaya Kaam Se ", "Pappu Can't Dance"," The Fox"," Loot", "Tom Dick and Harry Rocks Again", "Love Story 2050" etc.

Along with her singing career, Manasi has also acted in a couple of popular film which includes Jhootha Hi Sahi, Ek Main Aur Ekk Tu etc. She was also the anchor of many leading shows, which include Perfect 10 on Sony Pix, Glamorous on Zoom and E Buzz on AXN. She was the major judge in Cornetto Anchor Hunt on Zing/ETC.

Manasi Scott is the first Indian singer to have graced the coveted cover of The Week. She is also the first Indian singer to be a brand ambassador, model and host for brands such as Sunsilk, L'oreal and Reebok.

== Notable discography ==
- Okkadu Chalu (2000)
- Goppinti Alludu (2000)
- Snegithiye (2000)
- Raakilipattu (2007)
- Love Story 2050 (2008)
- Fox (2009)
- Tom, Dick, and Harry: Rock Again... (2009)
- Acid Factory (2009)
- Thillalangadi (2010)
- Loot (2011)
- Pappu Can't Dance Saala (2011)
- Aadhi Bhagavan (2013)
- Peter Gaya Kaam Se (2014)

== Filmography ==
- All films are in Hindi, unless, otherwise noted.

Year	Film	Role	Notes
2000	Snehithiye	Nimmi	Tamil film
2007	Raakilipattu	Manasi	Malayalam film
2010	Jhootha Hi Sahi	Krutika	
2012	Ek Main Aur Ekk Tu	Steph Braganza / Steph Karan Sharma	
2015	Bhaag Johnny	Ramona Bakshi	

== Television ==
- Perfect 10 on Sony Pix – Anchor
- Glamorous on Zoom – Anchor
- E Buzzon AXN – Anchor
- Cornetto Anchor Hunt on Zing/ETC – Judge
- Baby Come Naa- Web series on ALT Balaji
