= Shefali Jariwala =

Indian actress (1982–2025)

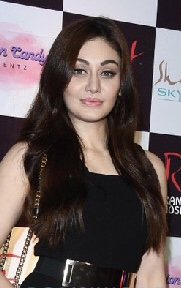
- Jariwala in 2020
- Born: 15 December 1982; Ahmedabad, Gujarat, India
- Died: 27 June 2025 (aged 42); Mumbai, Maharashtra, India
- Other name: The Kaanta Laga Girl
- Occupations: Actress; model
- Years active: 2002–2025
- Spouses: Harmeet Singh (m. 2004; div. 2009) Parag Tyagi (m. 2014)

Shefali Jariwala (15 December 1982 – 27 June 2025) was an Indian actress and model known for her work in Bollywood and Hindi music videos. She gained wide recognition starring in the 2002 remix music video Kaanta Laga, and was titled the "Kaanta Laga Girl" by several media outlets. She then played a supporting role in Mujhse Shaadi Karogi (2004) and a leading role in ALT Balaji's Baby Come Naa (2018).

Jariwala featured in the reality shows Nach Baliye 5 (2012–2013) and Nach Baliye 7 (2015), both alongside her husband Parag Tyagi, and as a wild card contestant in Bigg Boss 13 (2019).

== Early life and education ==
Jariwala was born on 15 December 1982 in Ahmedabad, Gujarat, India, into a Gujarati family.

She studied engineering in Information Technology at Sardar Patel College Of Engineering.

Her father worked as a chartered accountant, and her mother was employed by the State Bank of India.

== Career ==
Jariwala began her career in the entertainment industry with appearances in music videos. She rose to prominence with the 2002 remix video of the song Kaanta Laga, which became a popular hit and brought her widespread recognition. The success of the video led to her being popularly referred to as the Kaanta Laga girl, a moniker she has acknowledged in interviews.

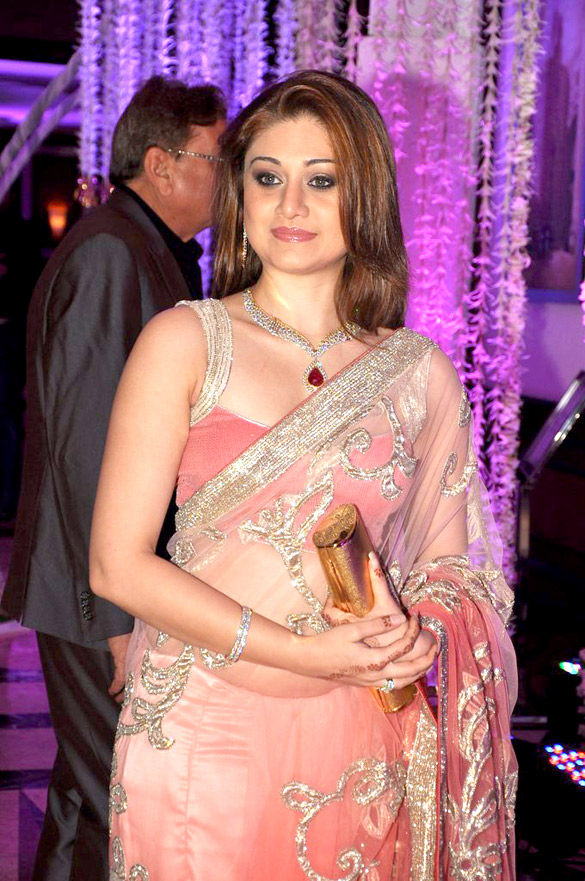
Shefali Jariwala at Sunidhi Chauhan's wedding reception, 2012

In subsequent years, she featured in various other music videos and made appearances in films, including Mujhse Shaadi Karogi (2004). Apart from Bollywood, Jariwala has also worked in the South Indian film industry and on web series. In 2011, she appeared in the Kannada-language film Hudugaru, a remake of the Tamil hit Naadodigal, which starred Puneeth Rajkumar, Yogesh, and Radhika Pandit. In the film, she performed the dance number Pankaja, sung by V. Harikrishna, Mamta Sharma, and Naveen Madhav.

She made her first reality television appearance in 2008 on the dance show Boogie Woogie. She later participated in Nach Baliye 5 (2012–2013), and in Nach Baliye 7 (2015–2016) alongside her husband Parag Tyagi. In November 2019, she entered the 13th season of the reality television show Bigg Boss as a wild card contestant. Her on-screen dynamic with fellow contestant Sidharth Shukla garnered significant attention from viewers, and her participation contributed to renewed public recognition.

== Personal life ==
In public interviews, Jariwala spoke about being diagnosed with epilepsy as a teenager. She experienced her first seizure at the age of 15 and underwent medical treatment for ten years. She credited yoga and fitness practices with helping her manage the condition and rebuild her self-confidence.

In 2004, Jariwala married Harmeet Singh, a musician and one half of the duo Meet Brothers. The couple divorced in 2009, following allegations of domestic abuse made by Jariwala.

In August 2014, she married actor Parag Tyagi, following a four-year relationship.

== Death ==
Jariwala died on 27 June 2025, at the age of 42, following a suspected cardiac arrest at her residence in Oshiwara, Mumbai. According to police sources, she had taken her routine medication that evening along with an anti-aging injection she had reportedly been using for several years under medical supervision. Later that night, her blood pressure dropped significantly and she began shivering, prompting her family to rush her to the hospital. It was reported that she had been fasting that day for a Satyanarayana Puja, which might have contributed to her complications. Forensic teams collected medical samples from her residence for further investigation. Her last rites were performed in Mumbai on 28 June 2025, and her ashes were immersed the following day, 29 June.

== Filmography ==
=== Television ===
Year	Show	Role	Notes
2008	Boogie Woogie	Contestant	Dance reality show
2012–2013	Nach Baliye 5	Contestant	Paired with Parag Tyagi
2015–2016	Nach Baliye 7	Contestant	Paired with Parag Tyagi
2019–2020	Bigg Boss 13	Contestant	Entered as a wild card
2024	Shaitani Rasmein	Kapalika	Recurring role

=== Film ===
Year	Film	Role	Language	Notes
2004	Mujhse Shaadi Karogi	Bijli	Hindi	Cameo appearance
2011	Hudugaru	Pankaja	Kannada	Featured in song "Pankaja"

=== Web series ===
Year	Series	Role	Platform
2018	Baby Come Naa	Sarah	ALT Balaji

=== Music videos ===
Year	Album	Song	Music	Singer
2002	DJ Doll (Kaanta Laga Remix...)	"Kaanta Laga"	Harry Anand	Shashwati
2004	Sweet Honey Mix	"Kabhi Aar Kabhi Paar"	Harry Anand	Sneha Pant & Babul Supriyo
2006	Meet Brothers - Fully Reloaded	Pyar Humein Kis Mod Pe	Harry Anand	Meet Bros
