= Entertainment (2014 film) =

Indian film by Sajid-Farhad

- Directed by: Sajid-Farhad
- Written by: Sajid-Farhad
- Story by: K. Subhash
- Produced by: Ramesh S. Taurani
- Starring: Akshay Kumar; Tamannaah Bhatia; Mithun Chakraborty; Krushna Abhishek; Johnny Lever; Sonu Sood; Prakash Raj
- Cinematography: Manoj Soni
- Edited by: Steven H. Bernard
- Music by: Sachin–Jigar
- Production company: Tips Industries
- Distributed by: Pen Studios
- Release date: 8 August 2014
- Running time: 145 minutes
- Country: India
- Language: Hindi
- Budget: ₹81 crore
- Box office: ₹115.93 crore

Entertainment is a 2014 Indian Hindi-language comedy film written and directed by screenwriter duo Sajid-Farhad and produced by Ramesh S. Taurani under the Tips Industries Limited banner. Based on an original story by K. Subash, the film stars Junior: The Wonder Dog as the titular protagonist and Akshay Kumar, along with Tamannaah Bhatia, Mithun Chakraborty, Sonu Sood, Krushna Abhishek, Johnny Lever and Prakash Raj. The film's music was composed by Sachin–Jigar, with cinematography by Manoj Soni and editing by Steven H. Bernard.

Entertainment was released theatrically worldwide on 8 August 2014. The film received mixed reviews and grossed ₹115.93 crore at the box office against a budget of ₹81 crore, falling short of breaking even.

== Plot ==
The film begins with Akhil Lokhande being paid for an advertisement, but a fight ensues when he is not given the full amount he was promised. This pattern of underpayment and resulting fights continues through several other assignments. Each fight ends when Akhil receives a phone call, prompting him to leave. He then arrives on a shoot where Saakshi is filming her television series. After her shoot, they go for a walk in the park, observing other couples. At the end of their walk, Akhil proposes to Saakshi.

Akhil and Saakshi visit her father's house, where her father insists that Akhil must become rich, (become a crorepati) before he can marry Saakshi. Determined, Akhil visits his film-obsessed friend Jugnu's shop and informs him that he is going to visit his father in the hospital due to chest pain. However, Akhil's father, Mr Lokhande, is actually faking his illness and enjoying the hospital's luxury services. Akhil arrives just in time to witness this and goes to confront Mr Lokhande, who reveals that Akhil is adopted. He explains that Akhil's real father was not ready for a child, so Akhil's mother left, only to be killed in a train crash. Akhil survived, and Mr Lokhande adopted him to claim compensation from the railway officers. In a fit of rage, Akhil beats up Mr Lokhande.

Back at his house, Akhil opens a chest containing love letters from his real father to his mother, along with a locket with their pictures. He discovers that his father is Pannalal Johri, a billionaire in Bangkok. Just then, the news on television announces Pannalal Johri's death and that his 30 billion fortune will go to anyone who can prove they are related to him. Upon arriving at his father's house in Bangkok, Pannalal Johri's lawyer informs Akhil that the dog named "Entertainment" is the heir to Johri's property. Akhil tells Jugnu, and they plot to kill Entertainment by having Akhil become the dog's caretaker, but they fail.

Saakshi and her father visit Akhil at the mansion and learn that Entertainment is the heir, leading Saakshi's father to declare that she will never marry Akhil. At this time, two brothers, Karan and Arjun Johri, second cousins of Johri, escape from jail. They plan to kill Akhil, believing the dog will die soon, thus inheriting the fortune themselves. While Akhil attempts to kill Entertainment, Karan and Arjun try to kill Akhil by drowning him in a thinly iced lake. Both brothers hit the ground simultaneously, causing Akhil to nearly fall in, but Entertainment saves him and falls into the lake instead. Despite Akhil's efforts, he fails to save Entertainment, but the dog survives.

Akhil realises his mistake, befriends Entertainment, and leaves the mansion. Karan and Arjun illegally acquire the property from Entertainment using their legal connections. Akhil learns of this and vows to retrieve the property for Entertainment. His strategy is to divide and conquer the brothers. He is hired as a servant at the mansion, now owned by Karan and Arjun, and tries to split the brothers by introducing Saakshi, who pretends to love each brother separately. The scheme fails.

Akhil then creates a false impression of Entertainment's ghost, causing the brothers to quarrel and accuse each other of disguising as the dog. Akhil's friends secretly tape their conversation, but the CD drops accidentally, and Karan and Arjun realise Akhil's plan. Entertainment runs with the CD, and Karan, Arjun, and their gang chase the dog, Akhil, and his friends. Akhil manages to defeat them. Later, Karan shoots at Akhil, but Entertainment takes the bullet. Akhil, enraged, thrashes Karan and Arjun.

Entertainment is taken to the hospital but cannot be revived. In a fit of anger, Akhil punches Entertainment, inadvertently saving him. Karan and Arjun apologise to Entertainment, who forgives them. Saakshi's father consents to Akhil and Saakshi's marriage, while Entertainment marries a female dog in the same ceremony, and even Jugnu marries another woman in a scene. The film concludes with Mr and Mrs Johri living happily with Mr and Mrs Entertainment and their children, delivering a social message: Love your pets, and they will entertain you all your life.

== Cast ==
- Golden Retriever Junior — the Wonder Dog as Entertainment
- Akshay Kumar as Akhil Lokhande / Akhil Johri, Pannalal's biological son and Mr. Lokhande's adopted son
- Tamannaah Bhatia as Saakshi
- Mithun Chakraborty as Saakshi's father
- Sonu Sood as Arjun Johri, Pannalal's nephew
- Krushna Abhishek as Jugnu, Akhil's film-obsessed friend who owns a video shop
- Johnny Lever as Habibullah Sheikh, Pannalal's lawyer
- Prakash Raj as Karan Johri, Pannalal's nephew

=== Cameo appearances ===
- Dalip Tahil as Pannalal Johri, Akhil's biological father
- Riteish Deshmukh as TV host
- Shreyas Talpade as cricketer
- Remo D'Souza as himself; a choreographer
- Vrajesh Hirjee as wannabe groom
- Darshan Jariwala as Mr. Lokhande, Akhil's adoptive father
- Hiten Tejwani as the show actor
- Sajid-Farhad as themselves; cricket commentators
- Kashmera Shah as Jugnu's bride

== Production ==
In February 2013, Ramesh S. Taurani announced a film starring Akshay Kumar and directed by Sajid-Farhad. Tamannaah Bhatia was confirmed as female lead in the following month. In April, Taurani confirmed that Sonu Sood and Prakash Raj will be playing the antagonists, with Johnny Lever in key role. The film was tentatively titled Entertainment. In an interview, Sajid-Farhad said that Kumar had motivated them to start their directing career and they had prepared the script for their directorial venture a long time ago. Shooting started on 3 June 2013 in Mumbai, where the mahurat shot was filmed. Television actor Hiten Tejwani also made a special appearance as a TV presenter. An audition was conducted in Bangkok for the role of the dog, Entertainment. A Golden Retriever named Wonder Dog was chosen from a total of 50 dogs to play the role. In June 2013, the producers, directors and Kumar discussed about shooting locations. Kumar expressed his wish to shoot the film in Bangkok, where he had worked as a waiter and trained in martial arts. The finalised locations included Baanpradhana Bungalow in Ongkuruk, Asiatique Mall, Ancient City, Bangkok University and Ongkuruk Railway Station.

On 1 July, shooting started in Bangkok for a three-month-long schedule, during which 80% of the film was shot. The remaining 10% of the film was shot in Mumbai, with one song in Goa during late 2013. The shooting was wrapped up in April 2014. A few songs and an item number were shot in Mumbai. During the film's censoring process, the Indian Censor Board objected to the name Abdullah for Johnny Lever's character, citing its sacred nature and frequent mispronunciations in the film, which could offend religious sentiments. Consequently, Sajid-Farhad changed the character's name to Habibullah a week before the film's release. The Board also objected to a joke involving the word HIV, leading to its removal from the film. Additionally, Kumar's character using a trident was objected to, resulting in the removal of the scene.

== Music ==
Entertainment

Soundtrack album by Sachin–Jigar
- Released: 2014
- Length: 19:13
- Label: Tips Industries Limited
- Producer: Ramesh S. Taurani

Sachin–Jigar chronology
Humpty Sharma Ki Dulhania (2014)	Entertainment (2014)	Bey Yaar (2014)

The soundtrack is composed by Sachin–Jigar, with their new A&R platform White Noise Productions, including only the duo at that point, composing the background score. This marked the first time the duo worked with Kumar. The song "Teri Mahima Aprampar" was lifted from the duo's composition of a song "Rowdy Fellows" for the Telugu film D for Dopidi. Kumar also sang one of the tracks of the film. The YouTube link of the making of the song was uploaded on Twitter.

The party single "Johnny Johnny" was released first. Based on a nursery rhyme, the song featured Kumar lip-synching to a female voice. The directors said about the song "...in a small subtle way, we are showing our support for women empowerment". Sunitra Pacheco of The Indian Express said that it had "all the ingredients to become a new party anthem". In a review for Rediff.com Joginder Tuteja said that the film's music "is entertaining, providing good fun at a frantic pace." He called "Veerey Di Wedding" "an infectious number" and praised Mika's voice. About the song "Johnny Johnny", he said, "it has addictive beats that get you hooked at the first listening" and praised the lyrics and singers. He added that the song "will be played for many months, till the next New Year party at least."

Track Listing
No.	Title	Lyrics	Artist(s)	Length
1.	"Johnny Johnny"	Mayur Puri	Jigar Saraiya, Priya Panchal & Madhav Krishna	3:38
2.	"Tera Naam Doon"	Priya Saraiya	Atif Aslam & Shalmali Kholgade	4:44
3.	"Veerey Di Wedding"	Mayur Puri	Mika Singh	3:34
4.	"Teri Mahima Aprampar"	Ashish Pandit	Udit Narayan, Sachin–Jigar & Anushka Manchanda	3:45
5.	"Nahi Woh Saamne"	Priya Saraiya	Atif Aslam	1:48
6.	"Veerey Di Wedding (Remix)"	Mayur Puri	Mika Singh	3:37
7.	"Johnny Johnny (Remix)"	Mayur Puri	Mika Singh	3:38

== Marketing ==
Previously titled It's Entertainment, the teaser trailer for the film was unveiled on 14 May 2014, with the theatrical trailer following on 19 May. Politician and animal rights activist Maneka Gandhi was the chief guest at the trailer launch ceremony. Initially, the producers intended to title the film Entertainment, but this was already registered for another upcoming film by Amole Gupte. However, in July 2014, Gupte donated the title to Sajid-Farhad as a friendly gesture. Akshay Kumar decided that the credit for the dog Junior should appear before his own. Some fraudsters released a poster of the film and falsely invited people to attend the music launch at Birla Matoshree. Producer Taurani issued a warning about these fraudulent posters. The film's satellite rights were sold to Zee TV for approximately ₹100 crore.

== Release ==
Entertainment was theatrically released worldwide on 2850 screens on 8 August 2014.

== Reception ==
=== Critical response ===
The film received mixed reviews from critics.

Meena Iyer of The Times of India praised the film's humour, Kumar's performance and his chemistry with Junior, especially in comic scenes. She stated that though the dog was not a good actor yet "his eyes can melt your heart." She said that the directors could have kept the film "tight". Mihir Fadnavis of Firstpost called it a "sheer genius" and said that it was Kumar's funniest film since Hera Pheri. He wrote that the film satirised all of the Sajid-Farhad films and took "potshots at everything that is wrong with desi cinema and television." He also appreciated the scene transitions and called it "technically great." Hindustan Times's Sweta Kaushal criticised the screenplay, Kumar and Prakash Raj's acting. She said that Bhatia "[did not] have much to do" and Chakraborty did not have much screenspace. However, she praised Abhishek's comedy and said that it was the "[only] bright spark in the film." She concluded her review by saying that the film was neither a "great piece of art" nor entertaining.

Prior to the film's release, Hindustan Times published an article titled Four reasons why you shouldn't waste your time on Entertainment and criticised the film's story, songs and dialogues. Shubha Shetty-Saha of Mid-Day wrote "Entertainment pleasantly surprises with its delightful absurdity and sure gets you roaring with laughter at several points." She called it a child friendly film and appreciated the dialogues and the performance given by the actors. However, Saha stated that the pace of the film's second half was slowed down by the excessive melodrama. Shubhra Gupta of The Indian Express wrote, "[Entertainment] is the film which misses the point entirely : it is dull and loud, with a brow so lowered that it reaches the floor." She also criticised the film's story and dialogues. Rohit Khilnani of India Today appreciated Kumar, Bhatia and Lever's performance and wrote that the rest of the cast was wasted. He criticised the plot and called it "senseless and full of loopholes."

Sukanya Verma of Rediff.com wrote "Entertainment is unapologetically filmi in its trappings, treatment, thought." She further wrote that the film was "mostly a garrulous, occasionally comical farce that intermittently serves as reminder that in the search of "entertainment, entertainment, entertainment" one can always rely on the delightfully loony Johnny Lever." Gayatri Sankar of Zee News called Kumar's acting one of the best comic performances he had given so far. She also appreciated the film's screenplay, cinematography, dialogues and the actor's portrayal of their respective characters. She wrote that a few of the songs could have been removed and the directors had succeeded in giving the message of treating "animals with respect and love". Writing for CNN-IBN, Rajeev Masand termed the film's humour repetitive and lazy. He criticised the film's story but appreciated Lever's performance by calling him "the single saving grace in this overcooked, misguided comedy". In his review for Bollywood Hungama, critic Taran Adarsh praised the humorous writing and the comedic acting talents of the actors. He called the film "a joy ride that lives up to its title." However, Daily News and Analysis called it a commercial failure and Tamannaah Bhatia's third disaster in a row.

=== Box office ===
Entertainment earned approximately ₹11 crore on its first day at the box office and grossed ₹56.50 crore in its first week. The film collected a total of ₹115.93 crore during its theatrical run.
