= Abhishek Bachchan filmography =

Filmography of the Indian actor and film producer

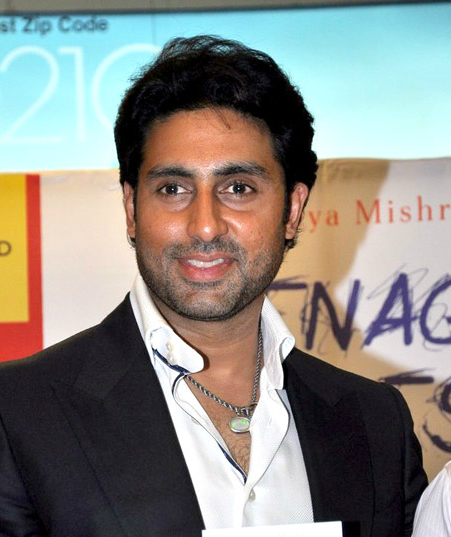
Bachchan in 2013

Abhishek Bachchan is an Indian actor and film producer known for his work in Hindi films. He made his acting debut opposite Kareena Kapoor in J. P. Dutta's war drama Refugee (2000), where his portrayal of the titular unnamed refugee earned a nomination for the Filmfare Best Male Debut Award. However, his subsequent films failed at the box office°, including Bas Itna Sa Khwaab Hai (2001), and Shararat (2002). His career prospects improved in 2004, when he played a gangster in Mani Ratnam's political drama Yuva and a police officer in Sanjay Gadhvi's action thriller Dhoom. The former won him his first Filmfare Award for Best Supporting Actor, and the latter became one of the highest-grossing films of the year and his first commercial success.

In 2005, Bachchan teamed up with his father twice in Ram Gopal Varma's thriller Sarkar and the crime comedy Bunty Aur Babli. The latter was the second highest-grossing film of the year, and his performance in Sarkar earned him a second Filmfare Award for Best Supporting Actor. That same year, he appeared in the Bengali film Antarmahal (2005). 2006 proved to be key for Bachchan, as he received his third consecutive Filmfare Award for Best Supporting Actor for his performance in Karan Johar's musical romantic drama Kabhi Alvida Naa Kehna (2006), and reprised his role in the action sequel Dhoom 2 (2006), which became the highest-grossing Bollywood film to that point. Bachchan next starred alongside Aishwarya Rai in Ratnam's critically and commercially successful drama Guru (2007), a biopic inspired by the life of businessman Dhirubhai Ambani. His title role in the film was positively received.

In 2008, Bachchan appeared in Varma's Sarkar Raj, the romantic comedy Dostana and the superhero film Drona. His first production was Paa (2009), starring him and his father, a comedy-drama which won the National Film Award for Best Feature Film in Hindi. This was followed by a brief career downturn with a series of flops, including Rakeysh Omprakash Mehra's satire Delhi-6 (2009), Ratnam's Raavan (2010) and the action thriller Game (2011). The comedy Bol Bachchan (2012), co-starring Ajay Devgan, proved to be his first box-office success since Paa. He followed this with supporting roles in two of the highest-grossing Indian films – Dhoom 3 (2013) and Happy New Year (2014). Following the 2016 comedy Housefull 3, Bachchan took a break and made a comeback with the romantic drama Manmarziyaan (2018).

== Films ==
Key
†	Denotes films that have not yet been released

Abhishek Bachchan filmograph
Year	Film	Role	Notes	Ref(s)
2000	Refugee	Refugee		
2000	Tera Jadoo Chal Gayaa	Kabir Srivastav		
2000	Dhai Akshar Prem Ke	Karan Khanna		
2001	Bas Itna Sa Khwaab Hai	Suraj Shrivastav		
2002	Haan Maine Bhi Pyaar Kiya	Shiv Kapoor		
2002	Desh	Anjan	Bengali film; Cameo appearance	
2002	Om Jai Jagadish	Jagadish Batra		
2002	Shararat	Rahul Khanna		
2003	Main Prem Ki Diwani Hoon	Prem Kumar		
2003	Mumbai Se Aaya Mera Dost	Karan Singh		
2003	Kuch Naa Kaho	Raj Malhotra		
2003	Zameen	ACP Jaideep "Jai" Rai		
2003	LOC: Kargil	Captain Vikram Batra		
2004	Run	Siddharth (Sidhu)		
2004	Yuva	Lallan Singh		
2004	Hum Tum	Sameer	Cameo appearance	
2004	Phir Milenge	Tarun Anand		
2004	Dhoom	ACP Jai Dixit		
2004	Rakht	Manav	Special appearance in the song "Kya Maine Socha"	
2004	Naach	Abhinav		
2005	Bunty Aur Babli	Rakesh Trivedi (Bunty)		
2005	Sarkar	Shankar Nagre		
2005	Dus	Shashank Dheer		
2005	Salaam Namaste	Dr. Vijay Kumar	Cameo appearance; Also Narrator	
2005	Antarmahal	Brijbhushan	Bengali film	
2005	Home Delivery	Himself	Cameo appearance	
2005	Ek Ajnabee	Bodyguard	Cameo appearance	
2005	Neal 'n' Nikki	Raj Singh	Cameo appearance	
2005	Bluffmaster!	Roy Kapoor		
2006	Alag	Himself	Special appearance in the song "Sabse Alag"	
2006	Kabhi Alvida Naa Kehna	Rishi Talwar		
2006	Lage Raho Munna Bhai	Sunny Khurana	Cameo appearance	
2006	Umrao Jaan	Nawab Sultan		
2006	Dhoom 2	ACP Jai Dixit		
2007	Guru	Gurukanth "Guru" Desai		
2007	Jhoom Barabar Jhoom	Rakesh "Rikki" Thakkral		
2007	Laaga Chunari Mein Daag	Rohan Varma		
2007	Shootout At Lokhandwala	Abhishek Mhatre	Special appearance	
2007	Aag	Dancer	Special appearance in the song "Mehbooba Mehbooba"	
2007	Om Shanti Om	Himself	Cameo	
2008	Sarkar Raj	Shankar Nagre		
2008	Mission Istaanbul	Dancer	Special appearance in the song "Nobody Like You"	
2008	Drona	Aditya (Drona)		
2008	Dostana	Sameer "Sam" Acharya		
2009	Luck by Chance	Himself	Cameo appearance	
2009	Delhi-6	Roshan Mehra		
2009	Paa	Amol Arte		
2010	Raavan	Beera Munda		
2010	Jhootha Hi Sahi	Jai	Voiceover	
2010	Khelein Hum Jee Jaan Sey	Surya Sen		
2011	Game	Neil Menon		
2011	Bbuddah... Hoga Terra Baap	–	Playback singer for the song "Go Mera Go"	
2011	Dum Maaro Dum	ACP Vishnu Kamath		
2012	Players	Charlie Mascrenhas		
2012	Bol Bachchan	Abbas Ali / Abhishek Bachchan (dual role)		
2013	Nautanki Saala!	Himself	Special appearance in the song "Draamebaaz"	
2013	Dhoom 3	ACP Jai Dixit		
2014	Happy New Year	Nandu Bhide / Vicky Grover (dual role)		
2014	The Shaukeens	Himself	Cameo appearance	
2015	All Is Well	Inder Bhalla		
2016	Housefull 3	Bhaskar "Bunty" Mittal		
2018	Manmarziyaan	Rajbir "Robbie" Bhatia		
2018	Mowgli: Legend of the Jungle	Bagheera	Hindi dub; Voiceover	
2020	Ludo	Batukeshwar "Bittu" Tiwari		
2021	The Big Bull	Harshad Mehta		
2021	Bob Biswas	Bob Biswas		
2022	Dasvi	Ganga Ram Chaudhary		
2023	Bholaa	Chomu Singh	Cameo appearance	
2023	Ghoomer	Padam "Paddy" Singh Sodhi		
2024	I Want to Talk	Arjun		
2025	Be Happy	Shiv Rastogi		
2025	Housefull 5	Jalbhusan "Jolly 2"		
2025	Kaalidhar Laapata	Kaalidhar (KD)		
2026	Raja Shivaji	Sambhaji Shahaji Bhosale	Bilingual film	
2026	King †	TBA	Filming	

== Production credits ==
Year	Name	Notes
2009	Paa	
2011	Bbuddah... Hoga Terra Baap	
2015	Shamitabh	
2023	Ghoomer	

== Television ==
Title	Year	Role	Ref.
National Bingo Night	2010	Himself	
Side Hero	2018	Himself	
Breathe: Into the Shadows	2020–2022	Dr. Avinash Sabharwal/J	
Sons of the Soil: Jaipur Pink Panthers	2020	Himself	
Angry Young Men	2024	Himself	

== Music video appearances ==
Music video featuring Abhishek Bachchan
Title	Year	Composer	Director	Role	Notes	Ref.
"Spirit of Chennai"	2016	C. Girinandh	Vikram	Himself	Non-album single	

== Discography ==
- 2005: "Right Here Right Now : Bluffmaster!" (Sunidhi Chauhan feat. Abhishek Bachchan)
- 2011: "Thayn Thayn" : Dum Maaro Dum with Earl, Ayush Phukan
- 2015: "Until the Sun Comes Up" (Raghav feat. Abhishek Bachchan & Nelly)

== See also ==
- List of awards and nominations received by Abhishek Bachchan
