= List of awards and nominations received by Lara Dutta =

Lara Dutta awards and nominations
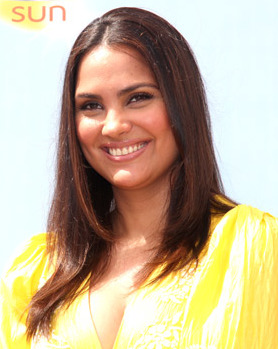
- Dutta in 2012
Awards and nominations
Award	Wins	Nominations
Filmfare Awards	1	1
IIFA Awards	0	3
Screen Awards	1	1
Zee Cine Awards	0	3
Stardust Awards	1	6
Sansui Viewers' Choice Movie Awards	1	1

Totals (Note: Certain award groups do not simply award one winner. They acknowledge several different recipients, have runners-up, and have third place. Since this is a specific recognition and is different from losing an award, runner-up mentions are considered wins in this award tally. For simplification and to avoid errors, each award in this list has been presumed to have had a prior nomination.)
- Wins: 5
- Nominations: 20

Lara Dutta Bhupathi is an Indian actress who predominantly works in Hindi films and series. Dutta is a recipient of a Filmfare Award, a Screen Award and a Stardust Award.

== BIG Star Entertainment Awards ==
Dutta has received one BIG Star Entertainment Awards nomination.

Year	Category	Film	Result	Ref.
2015	Most Entertaining Actor in a Comedy Role – Female	Singh Is Bliing	Nominated	

== Filmfare Awards ==
Dutta has won one Filmfare Awards.

Year	Category	Film	Result	Ref.
Filmfare Awards	Best Female Debut	Andaaz	Won (Note: Shared with Priyanka Chopra for the same film.)	

== Filmfare OTT Awards ==
Dutta has received one Filmfare OTT Awards nominations.

Year	Category	Work	Result	Ref.
2024	Best Supporting Actor in a Drama Series – Female	Ranneeti: Balakot & Beyond	Nominated	

== Indian Television Academy Awards ==
Dutta has received one Indian Television Academy Awards nominations.

Year	Category	Work	Result	Ref.
2022	Best Actress Comedy – OTT	Kaun Banegi Shikharwati	Nominated	

== International Indian Film Academy Awards ==
Dutta has received three International Indian Film Academy Awards nominations.

Year	Category	Film	Result	Ref.
2004	Star Debut of the Year – Female	Andaaz	Nominated	
2006	Best Supporting Actress	No Entry	Nominated	
2022	Best Supporting Actress	Bell Bottom	Nominated	

== Sansui Viewers' Choice Movie Awards ==
Dutta has won one Sansui Viewers' Choice Movie Awards.

Year	Category	Film	Result	Ref.
2004	Most Promising Debut Actress	Andaaz	Won	

== Screen Awards ==
Dutta has won one Screen Awards.

Year	Category	Film	Result	Ref.
2004	Most Promising Newcomer - Female	Andaaz	Won	

== Stardust Awards ==
Dutta has won one Stardust Awards from six nominations.

Year	Category	Film	Result	Ref.
2004	Superstar of Tomorrow – Female	Andaaz	Nominated	
2005	Exciting New Face	Khakee	Won	
2008	Best Supporting Actress	Jhoom Barabar Jhoom	Nominated	
2009	Best Actress	Billu	Nominated	
2011	Best Actress in an Ensemble Cast	Housefull	Nominated	
2012	Best Actress	Chalo Dilli	Nominated	

== Zee Cine Awards ==
Dutta has received three Zee Cine Awards nominations.

Year	Category	Film	Result	Ref.
2004	Best Female Debut	Andaaz & Mumbai Se Aaya Mera Dost	Nominated	
2008	Best Actor in a Supporting Role – Female	Jhoom Barabar Jhoom	Nominated	
2011	Best Actor in a Supporting Role – Female	Housefull	Nominated	

== Other awards ==
Year	Award	Category	Result	Ref.
2008	Rajiv Gandhi Awards	Contribution to Indian cinema	Won	
2024	Bollywood Hungama Style Icons	Most Stylish Mould-Breaking Talent of the Year	Nominated	

== Other honours ==
=== Pageantry ===
- Gladrags Manhunt and Megamodel Contest 1995.
- Miss Intercontinental 1997.
- Femina Miss India Universe 2000.
- Miss Universe 2000.

=== Media recognitions ===
- 2009: Dutta was placed 6th in the Times Most Desirable Women list.
- 2010: Dutta was placed 28th in Times Most Desirable Women list.
- 2013: Dutta was placed 24th in The Times of India's "50 Beautiful Faces" list.
- 2020: Dutta was placed 4th in Rediff.com's "Top OTT Actresses" list of 2020.
