= Angel Eyes (Raghav song) =

2005 single by Raghav

Single by Raghav featuring Jucxi and Frankey Maxx

from the album Storyteller
- B-side: "Can't Get Enough" (remix)
- Released: 7 February 2005
- Length: 3:28
- Label: A+R; V2
- Songwriters: R. Mathur; N. Mathur; J. Taylor; E. Bonner; L. Willis; S. Dunbar; F. Maxwell; R. Coward
- Producer: Sly and Robbie

Raghav singles chronology
"Let's Work It Out" (2004)	"Angel Eyes" (2005)	"My Kinda Girl" (2008)

"Angel Eyes" is a song by Canadian singer Raghav from his 2004 debut album, Storyteller. It features additional vocals by Jucxi and Frankey Maxx. It is a remake of Raghav's Hindi-language hit "Teri Baaton Mein" with new English language lyrics and new arrangement. "Angel Eyes" contains one brief Hindi language excerpt from "Teri Baaton Mein".

The single was released on 7 February 2005 and became Raghav's most successful release, peaking at number seven on the UK Singles Chart and spending six weeks on the chart. He performed the song live accompanied by the two artists on Top of the Pops in Britain. An official music video was also released. The single won Best Crossover Chart Act at the 3rd Urban Music Awards.

"Angel Eyes" is greatly inspired by a melody from the hits "Bam Bam" and "Murder She Wrote" by Jamaican reggae duo Chaka Demus & Pliers, and widely uses the song's music arrangement. "Murder She Wrote" was a success in the UK in early 1994, making it to number 27 and was included on the Chaka Demus & Pliers album Tease Me/All She Wrote.

== Track listings ==
UK CD1

1. "Angel Eyes" (radio edit) – 3:28
2. "Can't Get Enough" (Klimax's Desi Fix mix) – 4:29

UK CD2

1. "Angel Eyes" (extended original) – 4:51
2. "Angel Eyes" (Jamindian mix) – 6:37
3. "Angel Eyes" (Togerstyle mix) – 3:54
4. "Angel Eyes" (DJ Assad's & Jo Jo Yannik's Ayaashi mix) – 4:51
5. "Angel Eyes" (Hip Hop Twist featuring Iceberg Slimm and J. Freezy) – 4:08
6. "Angel Eyes" (video) – 3:28

== Charts ==
Chart (2005)	Peak position
Scottish Singles Sales (Official Charts)	20
UK Singles (Official Charts)	7
UK Indie (Official Charts)	1
UK Hip Hop/R&B (Official Charts)	3
