= Storyteller (Raghav album) =

Studio album by Raghav
- Released: September 6, 2004 (UK)
- Recorded: 2003–04
- Genre: Reggae fusion; R&B; pop
- Label: Mathurmatics Records Ltd.
- Producer: Sly & Robbie; Mushtaq Omar Uddin

Raghav chronology
Storyteller (2004)	Identity (2009)

Storyteller is the debut album from Canadian R&B singer Raghav. Combining elements of his South-Asian background with reggae and US style R&B, Raghav defined his own style as showcased in the UK top ten hits with "Can't Get Enough", "So Confused" and "Angel Eyes".

== Release ==
The album reached No. 36 on the UK Albums Chart. It sold more than 1.3 million copies globally.

== Reception ==
Caroline Sullivan of The Guardian rated the album 3/5 stars, stating, "Raghav's first album starts with a swirl of Bollywood strings, delivering a deceptive message about this Canadian-Indian singer. Though pushed as a sort of one-man, hunkier Cornershop, he's really more of an Asian Craig David."

The song "So Confused", won him the award for Best Single and Best Newcomer at the 2005 UK Asian Music Awards. The single "Angel Eyes", won Best Crossover Chart Act at the 3rd Urban Music Awards.

== Track listing ==
#	Title	Featured guest(s)	Time
1	"Let's Work It Out"	Jahaziel	4:08
2	"No I"		2:26
3	"No No"		4:57
4	"So Confused" (Album Radio Edit)		3:15
5	"Bad Bad Bad"		3:54
6	"C'mon"		3:33
7	"Weakness"		2:44
8	"Winter in My Mind"		4:22
9	"Ain't Nobody"		4:08
10	"Can't Get Enough"	Iceberg Slimm	3:23
11	"Angel Eyes"	Jucxi & Frankey Maxx	4:13
12	"Sooner or Later"	Kardinal Offishall	3:55
13	"Baby I'm Amazed"		5:51
14	"Another Bad Goodbye"		4:07
15	"Chor Diya (The Ultimate Sacrifice)"		4:18
16	"Teri Baaton Mein Aisa Uljha Jiya (Your Words)"		4:07

- The track "Let's Work It Out" samples the song "Leke Pahla Pahla Pyaar" from the soundtrack of the 1956 film C.I.D.
- The track "Can't Get Enough" samples the song "Kabhi Aar Kabhi Paar" from the soundtrack of the 1954 film Aar Paar
