= Raghav =

Canadian singer (born 1981)

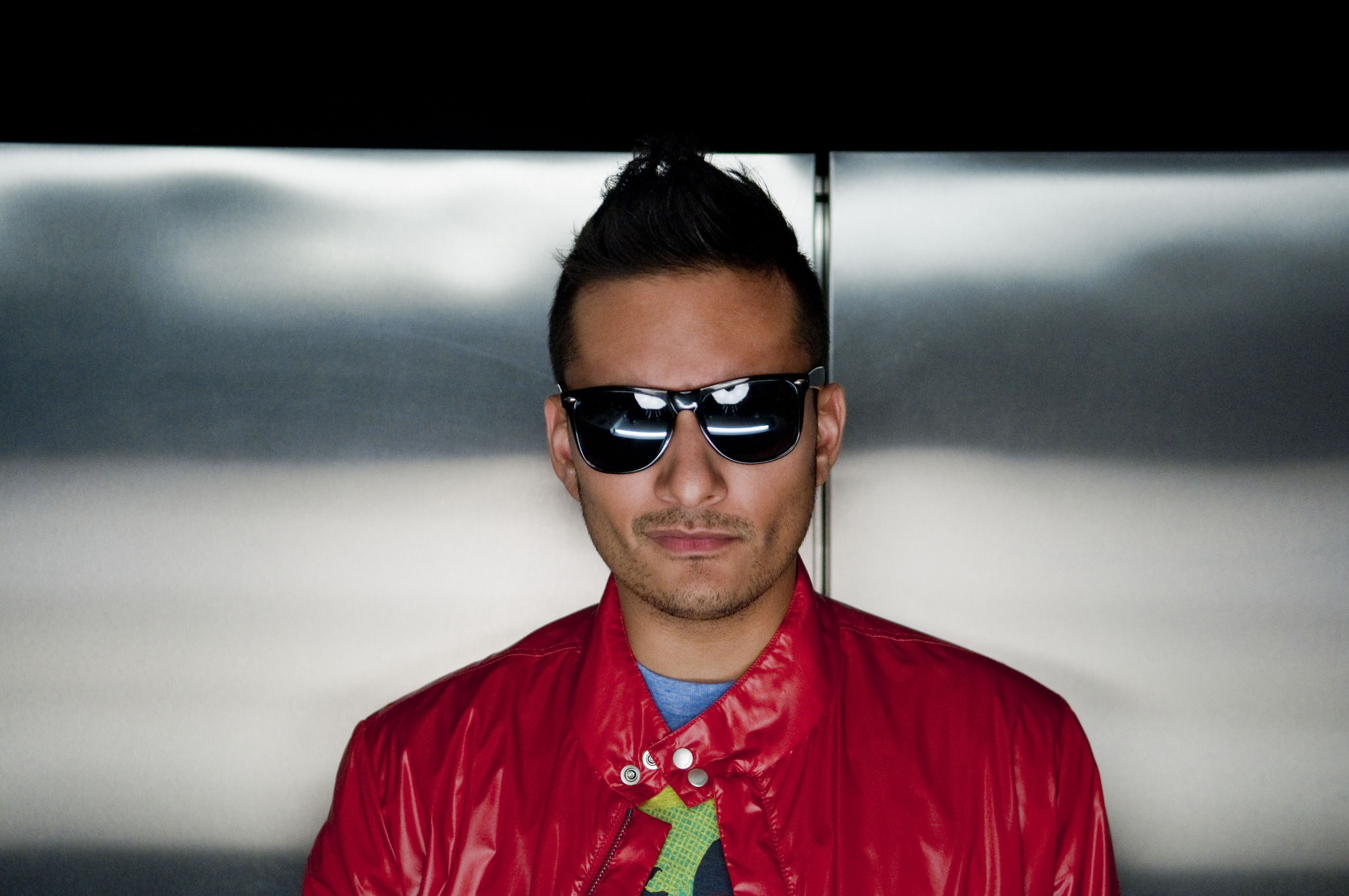

Background information
- Born: Raghav Mathur; April 2, 1981 (age 45); Toronto, Ontario, Canada
- Origin: Calgary, Alberta, Canada
- Genres: Pop; R&B; reggae fusion; Indian pop
- Occupation: Singer
- Years active: 2003–present
- Labels: A&R/V2, Universal, Cordova Bay, Ultra, Mathurmatics
- Website: raghav.com

Raghav Mathur (born April 2, 1981), professionally known as Raghav, is a Canadian singer and songwriter. He has released three studio albums: Storyteller (2004), Identity (2009), and The Phoenix (2012).

In the 2010s, he released singles including "So Much", "Fire", "Top of the World", "Woohoo", and "Until the Sun Comes Up".

== Early life ==
Raghav was born in Toronto, Ontario, to Hindu parents who emigrated from India. His parents moved to Calgary and Fort McMurray, Alberta, where he grew up. Raghav attended Sir Winston Churchill High School. At age seventeen, he moved to Los Angeles to develop his vocal skills with Seth Riggs. A year later, he moved to Liverpool, England where he studied at the Liverpool Institute for Performing Arts. During his time at the institute, he joined R&B band 11/7 which was nominated for a Mobo Award.

== Career ==
Raghav signed with A&R/V2 Records in 2003 and started working with the DJ and producer 2Play. He then recorded the single "So Confused" which was released in 2004 and reached number 6 in the UK Singles Chart. The next release, "Can't Get Enough", entered the UK Singles Chart at number 10. In August 2004, another collaboration with 2Play, "It Can't Be Right", was released, followed by "Let's Work It Out", before his debut album, Storyteller, was released in September 2004. His final release off the album was "Angel Eyes", inspired by a melody from "Murder She Wrote", by Chaka Demus & Pliers, and featured Jucxi and Frankey Maxx. The track reached number 7 in the UK chart. The album also included Kardinal Offishall for the song "Sooner or Later". In 2005, he toured internationally, performing in Karachi, New York City, and cities in Africa, Australia, and Canada. Raghav's debut album Storyteller (2004) sold over 1.6 million copies worldwide.

In 2009, Raghav signed a recording contract with Universal Music India and subsequently released his second album Identity. The album was exclusively released in India. The lead single, "My Kinda Girl" was released as a downloadable track from his website and featured hip hop musician Redman. The album also featured a tribute song called "Quincy Jones" which was dedicated to the American record producer Quincy Jones.

The next year, Raghav signed his first North American record deal with Canadian label Cordova Bay Records and released his third album The Phoenix. The first single from the album was the Labrinth-produced "So Much", which was commercially released in Canada and features Kardinal Offishall. The song was nominated for "R&B/Soul Recording of the Year" at the 2011 Canadian Juno Awards. The song was released in conjunction with a Hindi song entitled "Kya Se Kya Ho Gaya" which featured a sample from the song "Hold Yuh" by Gyptian. The second single off the album called "Fire", was commercially released in Canada and peaked at number 38 on the Canadian Billboard Hot 100. He performed his song, "Top of the World" on Breakfast Television on March 22, 2012.

In September 2012, Raghav was signed to Ultra Records in New York City. Ultra released Raghav's single "Fire" in the US and worldwide in January 2013.

In 2015, he released "Until the Sun Comes Up" featuring Indian film actor and playback singer Abhishek Bachchan and US artist Nelly. In 2016, he released the single "Do You Like", produced by UK producer Steel Banglez and featuring Moelogo.

In September 2018, Raghav announced he had partnered up with JioSaavn to release "Maayera" on their Artist Originals platform. It has exceeded 10 million streams globally and spent 15 consecutive weeks in the top 15 of the streaming charts in India. They collaborated again in the year 2020 and released a single called "Sufi".

=== Videos ===
- On October 9, 2013, Raghav released a lyric video of his single "Woohoo" on his YouTube page followed by "Take Me Away" in 2014.
- In March 2022, Raghav released a video for the song "Teri Baaton" from his first album which features some fan recreations of the song.
- In May 2023, Raghav released the single "Desperado" featuring Tesher, along with an accompanying music video. The track, produced by Mushtaq, incorporates elements of Bollywood and Western music. Following its release, actress Madhuri Dixit featured the song in a video on Instagram.

=== Features and other Collaborations ===
- Raghav featured (along with songwriter D'Vinci) in the 2007 single "Lonely" by rapper Iceberg Slimm.
- In early 2012, he collaborated with A. R. Rahman and Shilpa Rao for the song "Ishq Shava" from the 2012 Indian film Jab Tak Hai Jaan. He collaborated with him again for the song "Mawali Qawwali" for the film Lekar Hum Deewana Dil.
- In July 2013, Raghav and rapper Tom E were featured on the single "One More Round" by Michael Mind, as well as on "Celebrate" by Apache Indian about a month later.

== Discography ==
=== Albums ===
List of albums, with selected chart positions
| Year | Album Title | Peak chart positions | |
| Year | Album Title | CAN | UK |
|---|---|---|---|
| 2004 | Storyteller | — | 36 |
| 2009 | Identity | — | — |
| 2012 | The Phoenix | — | — |

=== Singles ===
List of singles, with selected chart positions
| Year | Single Title | Peak chart positions | | Album |
| Year | Single Title | CAN | UK | Album |
|---|---|---|---|---|
| 2004 | "Can't Get Enough" (feat. Iceberg Slimm) | — | 10 | Storyteller |
| 2004 | "Let's Work It Out" (with Jahaziel) | — | 11 | Storyteller |
| 2005 | "Angel Eyes" (feat. Jucxi & Frankey Maxx) | — | 7 | Storyteller |
| 2008 | "My Kinda Girl" (feat. Redman) | — | — | Identity |
| 2008 | "Humrahee" | — | — | Identity |
| 2010 | "So Much" (feat. Kardinal Offishall) | 93 | — | The Phoenix |
| 2010 | "Kya Se Kya Ho Gaya" | — | — | The Phoenix |
| 2011 | "Fire" | 38 | — | The Phoenix |
| 2012 | "Top of the World" | 82 | — | The Phoenix |
| 2014 | "Woohoo" | 76 | — | Non-album release |
| 2014 | "Take Me Away" | — | — | Non-album release |
| 2015 | "Until the Sun Comes Up" (feat. Abhishek Bachchan & Nelly) | — | — | Non-album release |
| 2018 | "Maayera" | — | — | Non-album release |
| 2020 | "Sufi" | — | — | Non-album release |
| 2023 | "Desperado" (feat. Tesher) | — | — | Non-album release |

As featured artist

List of singles, with selected chart positions
| Year | Single Title | Peak chart positions | | | | | Album |
| Year | Single Title | CAN | AUT | GER | SWI | UK | Album |
|---|---|---|---|---|---|---|---|
| 2003 | "So Confused" (2Play feat. Raghav and Jucxi) | — | — | — | — | 6 | Non-album release |
| 2004 | "It Can't Be Right" (2Play feat. Raghav and Naila Boss) | — | — | — | — | 8 | Non-album release |
| 2013 | "One More Round" (Michael Mind Project feat. Tom E and Raghav) | — | 53 | 80 | 40 | — | Non-album release |

== Songs from Indian films ==
| Year | Track Title | Co-Singer | Film | Music Director |
|---|---|---|---|---|
| 2011 | "Hey Na Na Shabana" | Solo | Hum Tum Shabana | Sachin–Jigar |
| 2012 | "Ishq Shava" | Shilpa Rao | Jab Tak Hai Jaan | A. R. Rahman |
| 2014 | "Aaya Khwaab Ka Mausam" | Solo | Kochadaiiyaan | A. R. Rahman |
| 2014 | "Mawali Qawwali" | Tanvi Shah | Lekar Hum Deewana Dil | A. R. Rahman |
| 2024 | "Teri Baaton Mein Aisa Uljha Jiya (Title Track)" | Asees Kaur | Teri Baaton Mein Aisa Uljha Jiya | Tanishk Bagchi |
| 2024 | "Killer Killer" | Asees Kaur | Murder Mubarak | Sachin-Jigar |

== Notable awards ==
- 2004: MOBO Award; Best Collaboration
- 2005: Urban Music Awards; Best Chart Act
- 2005: UK Asian Music Awards; Best Newcomer
- 2018: Brit Asia TV Music Awards; Special Recognition

Nominations

- 2000: MOBO Best Unsigned Act (11/7)
- 2008: Global Indian Music Academy Awards: Best Album
- 2011: "R&B/Soul Recording of the Year" at the Juno Awards of 2011 for his song "So Much" featuring Kardinal Offishall
