= Identity (Raghav album) =

Studio album by Raghav
- Released: 29 August 2009
- Recorded: 2006–09
- Genre: R&B; pop
- Label: Mathurmatics Records Ltd.

Raghav chronology
Storyteller (2004)	Identity (2009)	The Phoenix (2012)

Singles from Identity
- 1. "My Kinda Girl" Released: 13 October 2008; 2. "Humrahree" Released: 2008

Identity is the second album from the Canadian R&B singer Raghav with an international release in 2010. The album was pre-released in 2009 in a concert in New Delhi, India on Universal Music. It reached #3 on the Indian record charts.

== Singles ==
- "My Kinda Girl" - The first single was released on October 13, 2008. It features the popular US rapper Redman.
- "Humrahee" - The second single from the album, a Hindi track.

== Track listing ==
#	Title	Featured guest(s)	Time
1	"My Kinda Girl"	Redman	3:41
2	"Humrahee"		5:15
3	"Angelina"		4:51
4	"Once"	Iceberg Slimm	4:17
5	"Jaadugar"		5:42
6	"Quincy Jones"		3:52
7	"Naino Waali"		3:46
8	"Reasons"		2:54
9	"My Kinda Girl (Punjabi Hit Squad Remix)"	Redman	3:40
10	"My Kinda Girl (Flip N Spin Remix)"	Redman	6:02
