= Taba Chake =

Indian guitarist and singer-songwriter

- Born: Taba Chake; 24 December 1993 (age 32); Arunachal Pradesh, India
- Origin: India
- Genres: Indie pop, folk music, country music
- Occupations: Producer, composer, singer, song-writer, guitarist
- Instruments: Ukulele, guitar
- Years active: 2012–present

Taba Chake (born 24 December 1992) is an Indian Nyishi finger-style guitarist, multi-instrumentalist, and multilingual singer-songwriter. He is best known for the songs "Aao Chalein", "Shaayad", and "Walk With Me" from his album "Bombay Dreams". Chake writes in multiple languages, including his native Nyishi dialect, as well as Hindi, Assamese, and English, making him the first artist from Arunachal Pradesh to compose and release Nyishi songs on streaming platforms. His music blends folk, indie, and contemporary styles.

Chake is reported to be the first artist from Arunachal Pradesh to tour nationally. He is the Brand Ambassador for the Arts and Culture Department of the Government of Arunachal Pradesh.

== Early life ==
Chake was born in Khunglo Village, Papum Pare district, in Arunachal Pradesh. He started composing songs around 2007–2008 at the age of 15. His parents never went to school and he describes his generation as "the first generation who grew up with buildings, telephones, roads and cars." He speaks and understands five languages: Nyishi, Hindi, English, Nepali and Assamese, and uses all of these in his music. However, in 2010, he chose to prioritize the use of Nyishi to preserve the language and share it with a broader audience.

Chake experimented with many genres of music as he matured, including playing guitar and composing music for a metal band. He initially worked as a composer and guitarist in a metal band, specializing in technical metal. Later, he joined a Hindi band formed in 2009, which performed until mid-2011. The band released songs in 2010 and 2011, one of which was titled "Sun Le Meri." Chake continued to perform with the band until 2011, after which he began his solo career.

In 2012, he pursued a Bachelor of Arts degree at Dera Natung Government College in Arunachal Pradesh. In 2014, he was awarded the title of runner-up in the 'All India Finger Style Competition' in Bangalore. That same year, he received a scholarship to study music at the Swarnabhoomi Academy of Music in Chennai, but left the program before graduating, citing dissatisfaction with the course.

== Career ==
He began his independent solo career in 2012. He released his first EP, Bond With Nature, in 2016, an album that features only guitar and vocals.

His breakthrough came with the release of his debut 10-track album Bombay Dreams in 2019. The album received significant recognition, particularly for the tracks "Aao Chalein", "Shaayad", "Walk With Me", "Meri Dastaan", and "No Domo Lo", which contributed to its success. Bombay Dreams received 12.2 million streams across all platforms and made it to No. 12 on Apple Music's All Genre Charts. The album was co-produced by Ritwik.

In November 2020, He debuted the single "Blush", a track inspired by both his friends’ narratives of love and his own experiences with a long-distance relationship. It received significant attention, accumulating over 4 million streams on streaming platforms.

In 2023, Chake made his Bollywood debut as a playback singer with the song "Aye Mere Dil" for the film Kadak Singh, released on November 8. He is regarded as the first artist from Arunachal Pradesh to debut as a playback singer in Bollywood and has also ventured into film music composition. Kadak Singh, directed by Aniruddha Roy Chowdhury and produced by WIZ Films, features actors Pankaj Tripathi, Sanjana Sanghi, and Parvathy Thiruvothu in lead roles.

In 2024, Chake composed the soundtrack for I Want To Talk, a film directed by Shoojit Sircar, known for Piku and Madras Cafe. Starring Abhishek Bachchan and Johnny Lever, the movie premiered in theaters on November 22, featuring five songs by Chake.

He has performed at prestigious music festivals, including the Ziro Festival of Music, NH7 Weekender, Axean Festival, and Royal Enfield Motoverse 2023. He performed at the Arunachal GI Mahotsav 2025 in New Delhi, an event inaugurated by Deputy Chief Minister Chowna Mein, showcasing the state's cultural heritage and indigenous products.

In 2025, He was officially appointed as a Brand Ambassador of Arunachal Pradesh's Arts & Culture Department by the Smt. Dasanglu Pul, after his significant contributions to promoting the state's rich cultural heritage through his music.

== Musical Style and Influence ==
Chake's music amalgamates indie folk, acoustic pop, and contemporary influences. His multilingual songwriting blending Hindi, English, Assamese and Nyishi sets him well-known in the independent music scene. His lyrics were often inspired by the simplicity in portrayal of life in early songs by Don Williams, MLTR, The Beatles, Bruce Springsteen, Green Day, and more.

His guitar techniques, particularly his fingerstyle playing, have been influenced by Western acoustic musicians like Erik Mongrain, Netwon Faulkner, Andy McKee, while his storytelling style remains deeply rooted in his local heritage with his use of intricate guitar arrangements, rhythms, and percussive elements within his compositions.

One of his notable songs from the album "Bombay Dreams", "Walk With Me", became known in the indie scene for its simple yet evocative English lyrics and melody. The track was widely appreciated for its heartfelt storytelling and became one of his most-streamed songs. Shaayad, another major hit from "Bombay Dreams", blended melancholic acoustic tones. The song centers around the artist's contemplation, doubtfulness of giving life and his music career one final chance before considering stepping away from the industry.

Later releases included Aao Chalein, which achieved significant commercial success, amassing over 30 million streams. The track, inspired by Taba Chake's experiences in a small village in Arunachal Pradesh, became popular among Indian travelers and gained listeners internationally, including in Pakistan and parts of Europe. Blush introduced a more experimental sound while maintaining his folk influences, with richer instrumentation and varied vocal techniques. His 2020 single My Other Side adopted a more introspective and minimal style, blending elements from multiple musical genres in a cinematic arrangement.

His work on "I Want to Talk" demonstrated a new dimension of his artistry, as he explored film composition. The soundtrack featured melancholic ballads, uplifting acoustic tracks, and instrumental interludes, to the film's emotional depth.

Chake's music explores themes of philosophical depth, with elements of indie folk, acoustic pop, and contemporary influences. Most of his work engages with introspective emotions and reconnects with forgotten aspects of the inner self. Through poetic lyrics and profound melodies, his compositions emphasize a connection between individuals as well as with the natural world and the universe. His work has been described as exploring themes of pain and self-realization, featuring poetic lyrics and minimalist melodies, and often referencing ideas of interconnectedness with the natural world and the universe.

== Discography ==
=== Studio albums ===
- Bombay Dreams (2019)
- Khud Ko Miloon (2025)

=== EPs ===
- Bond with Nature (2016)

=== Singles ===
- Blush (2020)
- Udd Chala (2023)
- Monot Pore (2023)
- Kahani (2024)
- In wadiyon mein

=== Filmography ===
- I Want to Talk (Original Motion Picture Soundtrack)
