= List of awards and nominations received by Abhishek Bachchan =

Abhishek Bachchan awards and nominations
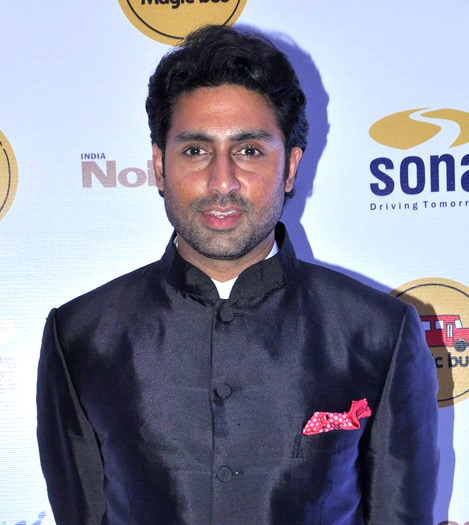
- Bachchan in 2013
Accolades
Award	Won	Nominated
Anandalok Puraskar Awards	2	2
BIG Star Entertainment Awards	2	2
Bollywood Movie Awards	3	4
Filmfare Awards	4	12
Filmfare OTT Awards	1	2
International Indian Film Academy Awards	7	12
National Film Awards	1	1
Producers Guild Film Awards	5	7
Screen Awards	6	13
Stardust Awards	4	10
Zee Cine Awards	4	9
Other Awards, Honors and Recognition's	13	13
- Total number of awards and nominations (Note: Awards in certain categories do not have prior nominations and only winners are announced by the jury. For simplification and to avoid errors, each award in this list has been presumed to have had a prior nomination.)
Totals	48	83
- References

Abhishek Bachchan (born 5 February 1976) is an Indian actor and film producer known for his work in Bollywood. He made his acting debut in 2000 with J. P. Dutta's war film Refugee and followed it by starring in over a dozen films that were both critical and commercial failures. His first commercial success came with the 2004 action film Dhoom, which changed his career prospects. Bachchan went on to earn critical appreciation for his performances in the dramas Yuva (2004), Sarkar (2005), and Kabhi Alvida Naa Kehna (2006), which won him three consecutive Filmfare Awards for Best Supporting Actor. In 2007, he portrayed a character loosely based on Dhirubhai Ambani in Mani Ratnam's drama film Guru, which earned him a nomination for the Filmfare Award for Best Actor.

Bachchan has also played leading and supporting roles in several commercially successful comedies, including Bunty Aur Babli (2005), Bluffmaster! (2005), Dostana (2008), Bol Bachchan (2012), Happy New Year (2014), and Housefull 3 (2016). His highest-grossing releases include the action sequels Dhoom 2 (2006) and Dhoom 3 (2013).

In addition to his three Filmfare Awards, Bachchan has won a National Film Award for Best Feature Film in Hindi for producing the comedy-drama Paa (2009).

== Anandalok Puraskar Awards ==
The Anandalok Puraskar Awards were presented by the ABP Group for outstanding achievement in Bengali cinema. The ceremony is one of the most prominent film events for Bengali cinema in India.

Year (Note: Refers to the year in which the ceremony was held.)	Film	Category	Result	Ref.
2005	Yuva	Best Actor (Hindi)	Won	
2010	Raavan	Best Actor (Hindi)	Won	

== BIG Star Entertainment Awards ==
The BIG Star Entertainment Awards is an annual event organised by the Reliance Broadcast Network.

Year	Film	Category	Result	Ref.
2012	Bol Bachchan	Most Entertaining Actor in a Comedy Film – Male/Female	Won	
2014	Happy New Year	Most Entertaining Actor in a Comedy Film – Male/Female	Won	

== Bollywood Movie Awards ==
The Bollywood Movie Awards were presented annually by The Bollywood Group beginning in 1999. They were discontinued after 2007.

Year	Film	Category	Result	Ref.
2005	Yuva	Best Supporting Actor	Won	
2005	Yuva	Best Villain	Won	
2006	Bunty Aur Babli	Best Comedian	Won	
2007	Kabhi Alvida Naa Kehna	Best Supporting Actor	Nominated	

== Filmfare Awards ==
Established in 1954, the Filmfare Awards are presented annually by The Times Group to members of the Hindi film industry.

Year	Film	Category	Result	Ref.
2001	Refugee	Best Male Debut	Nominated	
2004	Main Prem Ki Diwani Hoon	Best Supporting Actor	Nominated	
2005	Yuva	Best Supporting Actor	Won	
2005	Yuva	Best Villain	Nominated	
2006	Bunty Aur Babli	Best Actor	Nominated	
2006	Sarkar	Best Supporting Actor	Won	
2007	Kabhi Alvida Naa Kehna	Best Supporting Actor	Won	
2008	Guru	Best Actor	Nominated	
2009	Dostana	Best Actor	Nominated	
2009	Sarkar Raj	Best Supporting Actor	Nominated	
2010	Paa	Best Film	Nominated	
2015	Happy New Year	Best Supporting Actor	Nominated	
2022	Bob Biswas	Best Actor (Critics)	Nominated	
2024	Ghoomer	Best Actor (Critics)	Nominated	
2025	I Want to Talk	Best Actor (Critics)	Nominated	
2025	I Want to Talk	Best Actor	Won	

== Filmfare OTT Awards ==
Year	Title	Category	Result	Ref.
2020	Breathe: Into the Shadows	Best Actor in a Drama Series (Male)	Nominated	
2022	Dasvi	Best Actor in a Web Original Film (Male)	Won	

== International Indian Film Academy Awards ==
The International Indian Film Academy Awards (shortened as IIFA) is an annual international event organized by the Wizcraft International Entertainment Pvt. Ltd. to honor excellence in the Hindi cinema.

Year	Film	Category	Result	Ref.
2001	Refugee	Star Debut of the Year – Male	Won	
2005	Yuva	Best Supporting Actor	Won	
2006	Sarkar	Best Supporting Actor	Won	
2007	Kabhi Alvida Naa Kehna	Best Supporting Actor	Nominated	
2008	Guru	Style Icon of the Year	Won	
2008	Guru	Best Actor	Nominated	
2009	Dostana	Best Actor	Nominated	
2009	Dostana	Best Comedian	Won	
2009	Sarkar Raj	Best Supporting Actor	Nominated	
2010	Paa	Best Film	Nominated	
2013	Bol Bachchan	Best Comedian	Won	
2025	I Want to Talk	Best Actor	Nominated	

== National Film Awards ==
The National Film Awards are awarded by the Government of India's Directorate of Film Festivals division for achievements in the Indian film industry.

Year	Film	Category	Result	Ref.
2010	Paa	Best Feature Film in Hindi	Won	

== Producers Guild Film Awards ==
The Producers Guild Film Awards (previously known as the Apsara Film & Television Producers Guild Awards) is an annual event originated by the Film Producers Guild of India to recognize excellence in Indian film and television.

Year	Film	Category	Result	Ref.
2006	Yuva	Best Actor in a Supporting Role	Won	
2008	Guru	Best Actor in a Leading Role	Nominated	
2009	Dostana	Best Actor in a Leading Role	Nominated	
2010	—N/a	Most Public Appearances Award	Won	
2013	Bol Bachchan	Best Actor in a Comic Role	Won	
2013	—N/a	Hindustan Times Outstanding Contribution to Society (along with Aishwarya Rai Bachchan)	Won	
2015	Happy New Year	Best Actor in a Supporting Role	Won	

== Screen Awards ==
The Screen Awards are presented annually by Indian Express Limited to honor excellence in Hindi and Marathi cinema.

Year	Film	Category	Result	Ref.
2001	Refugee	Most Promising Newcomer – Male	Nominated	
2005	Yuva	Best Supporting Actor	Won	
2006	Bunty Aur Babli	Best Comedian	Won	
2006	Bunty Aur Babli	Jodi No. 1 (along with Rani Mukerji)	Won	
2006	Sarkar	Best Supporting Actor	Nominated	
2007	Kabhi Alvida Naa Kehna	Best Supporting Actor	Nominated	
2008	Guru	Best Actor	Nominated	
2009	Dostana	Best Actor	Nominated	
2009	Dostana	Jodi No. 1 (along with John Abraham)	Won	
2009	Sarkar Raj	Best Supporting Actor	Nominated	
2010	Paa	Best Film	Nominated	
2010	Paa	Jodi No. 1 (along with Amitabh Bachchan)	Won	
2013	Bol Bachchan	Best Comedian	Won	
2015	Happy New Year	Best Comedian	Nominated	

== Stardust Awards ==
The Stardust Awards are an annual event organized by Magna Publishing Company Limited.

Year	Film	Category	Result	Ref.
2005	Yuva	Star of the Year – Male	Won	
2007	Kabhi Alvida Naa Kehna	Best Supporting Actor	Won	
2008	Guru	Star of the Year – Male	Nominated	
2009	Dostana & Sarkar Raj	Star of the Year – Male	Nominated	
2010	Paa	Best Supporting Actor	Won	
2011	Khelein Hum Jee Jaan Sey	Best Actor in a Drama	Nominated	
2012	Dum Maaro Dum	Best Actor in a Thriller or Action	Nominated	
2013	Bol Bachchan	Star of the Year – Male	Nominated	
2013	Bol Bachchan	Best Actor in a Comedy or Romance	Won	
2014	Happy New Year	Best Supporting Actor	Nominated	

== Zee Cine Awards ==
The Zee Cine Awards is an annual award ceremony organized by the Zee Entertainment Enterprises.

Year	Film	Category	Result	Ref.
2001	Refugee	Best Male Debut	Nominated	
2005	Yuva	Best Performance in a Negative Role	Nominated	
2005	Phir Milenge	Best Actor in a Supporting Role – Male	Won	
2006	Sarkar	Best Actor in a Supporting Role – Male	Won	
2007	Kabhi Alvida Naa Kehna	Best Actor in a Supporting Role – Male	Won	
2008	Guru	Best Actor – Male	Nominated	
2011	Raavan	Best Performance in a Negative Role	Nominated	
2013	Bol Bachchan	Best Actor in a Comic Role	Won	
2014	Dhoom 3	Best Actor in a Supporting Role – Male	Nominated	

== Iconic Gold Awards ==
The Iconic Gold Awards is an annual awards show that honors the best performers in the Hindi films and television industry.

Year	Film	Category	Result	Ref.
2024	Ghoomer	Best Actor	Won	

== Other awards, honors and recognitions ==
Year	Work	Academy / Award / organization	Category	Result	Ref.
2005	Yuva	BBC Asian Network – Film Café Awards	Best Supporting Actor	Won	
2006	Kabhi Alvida Naa Kehna	Global Indian Film Awards	Best Supporting Actor	Won	
2006	—N/a	Government of Uttar Pradesh – Yash Bharati Award	Remarkable Contribution Towards Cinema	Won	
2010	—N/a	GQ Men of the Year	Ultimate GQ Man of the Year	Won	
2013	Bol Bachchan	Times of India Film Awards	Best Actor in a Comic Role	Won	

== See also ==
- Abhishek Bachchan filmography
- List of accolades received by Guru
