= My Kinda Girl =

My Kinda Girl or My Kind of Girl may refer to:

- "My Kind of Girl" (Matt Monro song), 1961
- "My Kinda Girl" (Babyface song), 1990
- "My Kind of Girl" (Collin Raye song), 1994
- "My Kinda Girl" (Raghav song), 2008
