= Lara Dutta =

Indian actress (born 1978)

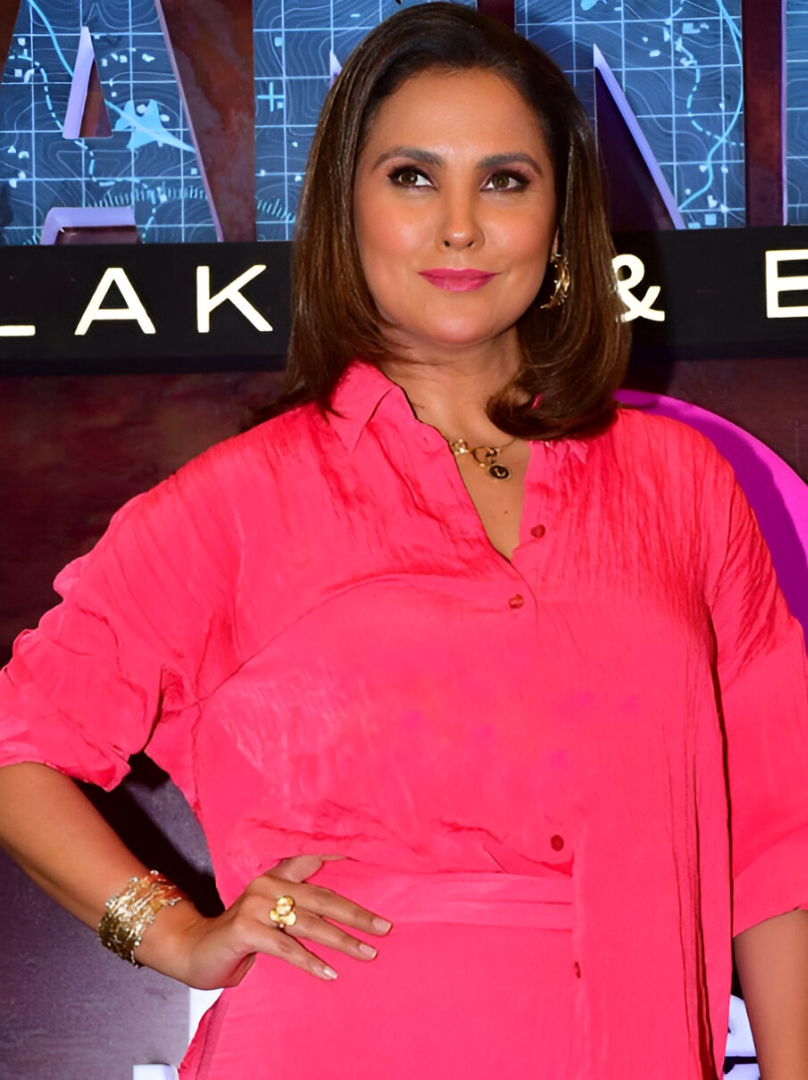
- Dutta in 2024
- Born: 16 April 1978 (age 48); Ghaziabad, Uttar Pradesh, India
- Education: University of Mumbai
- Occupation: Actress
- Years active: 1995–present
- Title: Miss Universe 2000; Miss India 2000; Miss Intercontinental 1997
- Spouse: Mahesh Bhupathi (m. 2011)
- Children: 1
- Awards: Full list

Lara Dutta Bhupathi (née Dutta; born 16 April 1978) is an Indian actress. The winner of Miss Intercontinental 1997 and Miss Universe 2000 pageants, she has since predominantly worked in Hindi films and series. Dutta is a recipient of a Filmfare Award and established herself as a prominent leading actress in the 2000s.

Dutta made her acting debut with Andaaz (2003), which won her the Filmfare Award for Best Female Debut. She went on to star in several commercially successful films, including the comedies Masti (2004), No Entry (2005), Bhagam Bhag (2006), Partner (2007), Housefull (2010), and Chalo Dilli (2011), and the action film Don 2 (2011). Following a hiatus, Dutta appeared in the British drama miniseries Beecham House in 2019 and portrayed Indira Gandhi in the film Bell Bottom (2021). She has since taken on roles in streaming series such as Hundred (2020), Kaun Banegi Shikharwati (2022) and Ranneeti: Balakot & Beyond (2024).

In addition to her acting career, Dutta has hosted several award shows and has her own line of beauty care products. She is married to tennis player Mahesh Bhupathi, with whom she has a daughter.

== Early life and background ==
Dutta was born 16 April 1978 to a Punjabi Hindu father and an Anglo-Indian mother in Ghaziabad, Uttar Pradesh. Her father was Wing Commander L. K. Dutta (retired) and her mother is Jennifer Maureen Dutta (née Storey). Nitin Sawhney, who is a music composer and DJ is Dutta's cousin.

Dutta moved to Bengaluru in 1981 where she completed high school at the St. Francis Xavier Girls' High School and Frank Anthony Public School. She graduated with a degree in economics and a minor in communications from the University of Mumbai. She is fluent in English and Hindi and can also speak Punjabi and Kannada.

== Pageantry ==
=== Femina Miss India ===
Dutta won the annual Gladrags Manhunt and Megamodel Contest in 1995, thus winning the right to enter the 1997 Miss Intercontinental Pageant. She was later crowned Miss Intercontinental 1997. In 2000, she entered and won the Femina Miss India contest receiving the title of Femina Miss India Universe. This allowed her to represent India at the Miss Universe 2000.

=== Miss Universe ===
Dutta won Miss Universe 2000 in Cyprus. Dutta was crowned by the outgoing titleholder Mpule Kwelagobe of Botswana. In the same year, Priyanka Chopra and Dia Mirza won their respective Miss World and Miss Asia Pacific titles which gave India a rare triple victory in the world of beauty pageants. During her reign as Miss Universe, she visited 42 countries. She is the second woman from India to be crowned Miss Universe. She received the highest score in the swimsuit competition and her finale interview score is the highest individual score in any category in the history of the Miss Universe contest. Dutta crowned her successor Denise Quiñones of Puerto Rico at the end of Miss Universe 2001.

Dutta has been a United Nations Population Fund Goodwill Ambassador since 2001. Dutta has stated, "Celebrities with the power to affect their impressionable minds therefore have a moral responsibility to impart positive messages. I am committed to using any influence I may have to do just that as a Goodwill Ambassador of the United Nations Population Fund (UNFPA)".

== Acting career ==
=== Debut and early work (2003–2004) ===
Dutta made her screen debut in 2003 with Andaaz, playing Kajal opposite Akshay Kumar. In the film, Dutta's voice was dubbed by Mona Ghosh Shetty as the filmmakers wanted two distinct characters for the female leads and they needed Kajal, Dutta's character, to have a high-pitched voice. According to Dutta, her role as the tomboy Kajal revealed a new and very private side of her on screen. Andaaz became a major box office success and won her the Filmfare Award for Best Female Debut. Derek Elley of Variety noted that Dutta wins the acting stakes and handle her character reversals with aplomb. A critic of BBC opined that she "impresses" in emotional scenes. Later the year, she played Kesar, a village girl opposite Abhishek Bachchan in Mumbai Se Aaya Mera Dost.

Dutta started 2004 with a cameo appearance in Khakee, in the song "Aisa Jadoo", which went on to become a chartbuster upon release and earned her the Stardust Award for Exciting New Face. She then played Monica who lures three married men, in Masti which was a commercial success. Priya Ganapati of Rediff.com stated that she plays her character well. In Bardaasht which failed to do well at the box office, she played an advocat opposite Bobby Deol. Subhash K. Jha noted, "As a lawyer Lara delivers her lines with conviction. One wishes there was more of her." She then appeared in the Tamil film, Arasatchi, which was supposed to be her debut release in 2002 but due to financial problems, it was postponed. In her final film of the year, Aan: Men at Work she played a police officer's lover opposite Akshay Kumar. Dutta revealed in an interview that she was offered a role in The Matrix franchise but turned down the offer due to her mother's illness at the time.

=== Commercial success and critical acclaim (2005–2010) ===
The year 2005 marked a turning point in her career with six releases. Dutta first played a journalist in Insan opposite Ajay Devgn and a criminal's lover opposite John Abraham in Elaan, both of which were box office failures. Dutta then played Sanjana, who marries for money and frame her husband for her fake death in Jurm, opposite Bobby Deol. Vivek Fernandes stated, "Lara has a meaty role; she sizzles in the first half, goes a bit over the top toward the end but overall turns in a commendable performance." In Kaal, she played Ishika opposite Vivek Oberoi. The film was a moderate success at the box office. Dutta then appeared in No Entry opposite Anil Kapoor, which went on to become the biggest success of the year. She played Kajal, a suspicious wife and Taran Adarsh felt she played the character to "perfection", in one of her most uninhibited works. Her final release that year, Dosti: Friends Forever saw her pair opposite Bobby Deol, and play an NRI. Patcy N stated that she looks "good", but her role is far too short. No Entry earned her a nomination for IIFA Award for Best Supporting Actress.

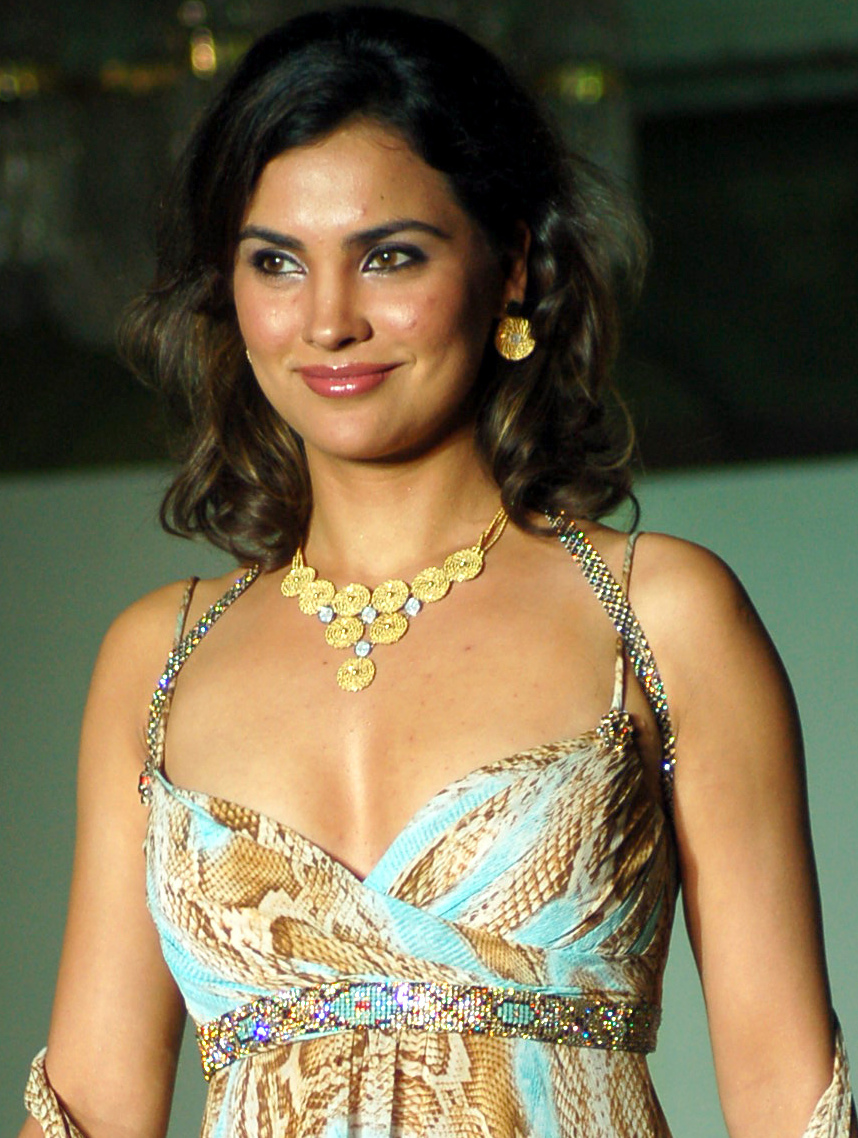
Dutta at an event in 2005

In 2006, Dutta first appeared in Zinda as a taxi driver opposite Sanjay Dutt. She then had a special song appearance in Alag. Dutta then played Aditi / Munni, a lady with suicidal tendencies opposite Akshay Kumar in Bhagam Bhag, which was a box office success. A critic of Idlebrain found her to be just "adequate". She then had a cameo appearance as Zeenat in Fanaa.

Dutta started 2007 with Jhoom Barabar Jhoom, playing double-role of Anaida and Laila, opposite Bobby Deol and Abhishek Bachchan. The film was a moderate success. Rajeev Masand found her to be hilarious in the post-interval portions. Dutta then played Naina, a single mother and reporter opposite Salman Khan in Partner, one of the year's highest-grossing film. Syed Firdaus Ashraf was appreciative of her chemistry with Khan. She then made a special appearance in Om Shanti Om, and later presented a documentary film titled Sold: An MTV EXIT Special by Charmaine Choo which followed the tragedy of trafficking in South Asia where thousand of young girls and boys are sold into modern-day slavery.

In 2008, Dutta voiced Sonia, a female elephant in the animated film, Jumbo opposite Akshay Kumar. She made a special appearance in Rab Ne Bana Di Jodi in the song "Phir Milenge Chalte Chalte" where she paid tribute to actress Helen. Dutta started 2010 with Billu Barber opposite Irrfan Khan, playing Bindiya, a poor barber's wife. The film was a moderate success at the box office. For her performance, she earned Stardust Award for Best Actress nomination. Dutta then played a supermodel opposite Govinda in Do Knot Disturb and a businessman's wife in Blue opposite Sanjay Dutt, both of which were commercial failures. For Blue, Taran Adarsh stated, "Lara has never looked so good before. Though the story revolves around the guys, you can't overlook her small but significant contribution to the film."

In her only release of 2010, Dutta played a Gujarati bartender opposite Riteish Deshmukh, in Housefull. The film emerged a major commercial success and collected ₹1.14 billion (US$12 million) at the box office. Gaurav Malani from IndiaTimes found Dutta to be "alluring". Komal Nahta stated that Dutta proves that she can be fantastic in comedies. Her performance in the film earned her a nomination for Zee Cine Award for Best Actor in a Supporting Role – Female.

=== Sporadic work and further expansion (2011–2020) ===
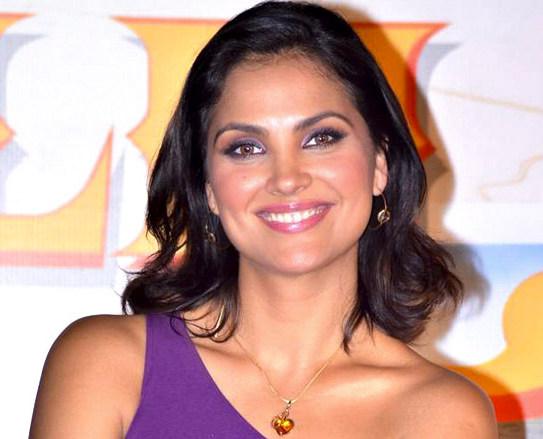
Dutta promoting Chalo Dilli in 2011

Dutta's first film of 2011 was Chalo Dilli, her first film as a producer. She played Mihika, an investment banker alongside Vinay Pathak. The film was a moderate success, as it was made on a modest budget of ₹50 million (US$530,000). Taran Adarsh found her performance to be "convincing" despite some rough edges. She earned another Stardust Best Actress nomination for the film. She next appeared alongside Shah Rukh Khan in Don 2, playing one of his companion. She also sang "Zara Dil Ko Thaam Lo" for the film. It emerged as one of the highest-grossing films of the year.

Following her post-pregnancy break from acting, Dutta appeared in the 2013 Hindi film David, playing a mother, Neelam, this film was partially reshot in Tamil in the same title where Dutta's character name was Gayathri. In 2015, she played Emily, a translator alongside Akshay Kumar in Singh Is Bliing, which emerged a financial success, grossing over ₹ 1.16 billion worldwide. Tushar Joshi from Daily News and Analysis was appreciative of her comic timing.

Dutta played Leena, in her first film of 2016, Fitoor. Rachit Gupta of Filmfare praised her supporting part. She then played an advocate in Azhar. Mehul S Thakkar of Deccan Chronicle found her performance to be "controlled yet aggressive". Both of her releases were commercial failures. Post this, Dutta played Sophie in the 2018 film Welcome to New York, a box office failure.

Dutta ventured into television series with the 2019 ITV English series, Beecham House. where she played Begum Samru. She expanded to web shows in 2020, with Hundred, playing a police inspector Soumya. Divyanshi Sharma of India Today stated, "Lara Dutta makes an impressive web-series debut with the show. The actress lets her eyes do the talking in various scenes and delivers every dialogue with finesse."

=== Streaming projects and further work (2021–present) ===
Dutta started 2021 with her portrayal of former Prime Minister of India, Indira Gandhi in the spy film Bell Bottom alongside Akshay Kumar. The film became a commercial failure, but Monika Rawal Kukreja was appreciative of her performance and termed her "terrific". She then played Vasudha, a divorcee and single mother on a fun ride, in the series Hiccups and Hookups. The following year, Dutta played Devyani, princess of a dyfunctional royal family in the series Kaun Banegi Shikharwati opposite Cyrus Sahukar. Nandini Ramnath of Scroll.in opined that she was fine as a comedienne and "ably aided" the cast.

In 2023, Dutta first appeared in the anthology film Ishq-e-Nadaan, playing an industrious Ramona. The film received mixed reviews and was released on JioCinema. She then played a semi-classical vocalist Wilayat, in the series Charlie Chopra & The Mystery Of Solang Valley. Pratikshya Mishra of The Quint stated that despite limited screen time, Dutta maintains her character's mystery. In 2024, Dutta played Manisha, National Security Bureau head in the series, Ranneeti: Balakot & Beyond. Vinamra Mathur of Firstpost noted, "The actress brims with a certain sense of vibrancy, especially in her scene with Shergill." She received nomination for Best Supporting Actress in a Drama Series at the Filmfare OTT Awards.

In her first release of 2026, Dutta starred in the ensemble comedy Welcome to the Jungle alongside Akshay Kumar. It emerged as a commercial success and the ninth highest-grossing Hindi film of the year. Following this, she portrayed Queen Kaikeyi opposite Arun Govil, in Ramayana: Part 1, directed by Nitesh Tiwari. Simran Singh of DNA opined that Dutta as Kaikeyi "makes her presence amply felt".

== Other ventures ==
=== Television ===
Dutta has hosted the International Indian Film Academy Awards five times. She first hosted the 3rd IIFA Awards in 2002 and subsequently the 7th IIFA Awards with Fardeen Khan in 2006, 8th IIFA Awards with Boman Irani in 2007 and the 10th IIFA Awards and 11th IIFA Awards in 2009 and 2010, respectively. The last two times she co-hosted with both Boman Irani and Riteish Deshmukh. In 2018, Dutta turned a talent judge on the reality show High Fever.

=== Philanthropy and other work ===
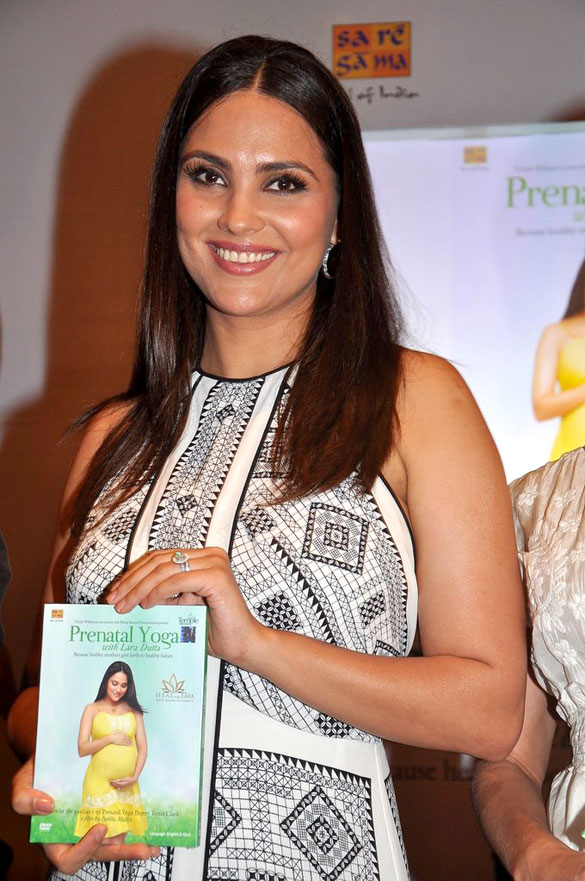
Dutta in 2012, at her Prenatal Yoga DVD launch

Dutta is active in pre-natal yoga on YouTube. During her pregnancy in 2012, she launched a DVD consisting of pre-natal routines and meditation techniques. Dutta was appointed as a UNFPA Goodwill Ambassador in 2001.

In 2017, Dutta began mentoring contestants at the Miss Diva contest. She stated "It's exciting to be a part of this journey in finding the perfect representative who is the Indian face of beauty, who possesses elegance, confidence, poise and intelligence. This journey has always been close to my heart and I hope this season is the one that brings us that exceptional girl who will bring the Miss Universe crown back to India".

In 2011, Dutta initiated a campaign called "Kick For Change", for underprivileged kids. Later, she participated in Kaun Banega Crorepati to raise funds for an acid attack victim. In 2019, Dutta launched her own vegetarian beauty care product brand called Arias.

== In the media ==
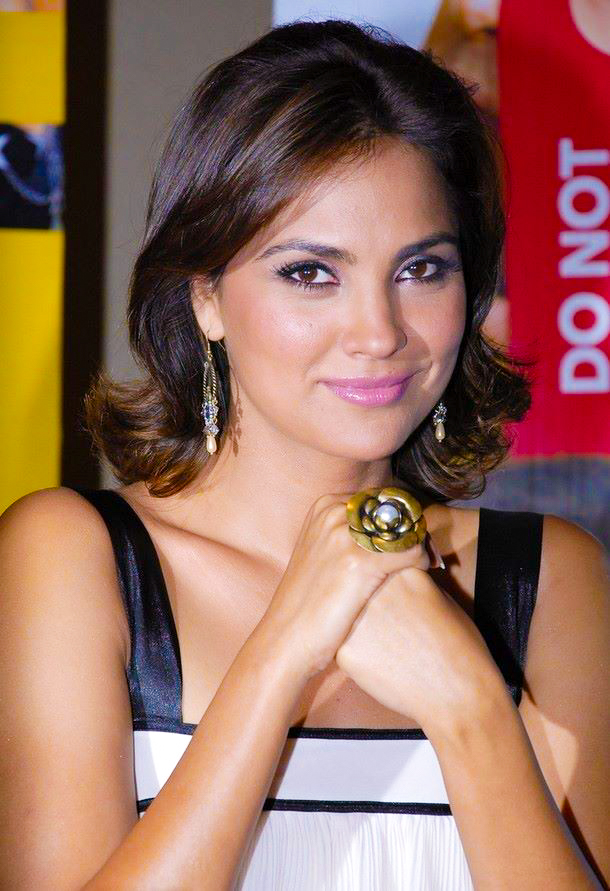
Dutta in 2009

Commenting on Dutta's career and her roles, Subhash K. Jha noted, "Lara is subtle yet upfront, strong but fragile, she encompasses the best of both worlds - feminine and aggressive, within her personality." Sweta Kaushal of Forbes India stated, "Dutta has always been very clear about her choices. She always knew what were her priorities." Rajiv Vijayakar of Bollywood Hungama finds her to be "versatile". In Rediff.com's "Best Bollywood Actresses" list, Dutta was placed 10th in 2007. She was further placed 4th in its "Top OTT Actresses" list of 2020. In the Times Most Desirable Women list, Dutta was placed 6th in 2009 and 28th in 2010. In 2009, she was also placed 9th in Maxim's "Hot 100" list. Times of India also placed her 24th in its "50 Beautiful Faces" list.

Dutta is known for her eloquent speaking skills. She has been a vocal supporter of the Me Too movement in India. Dutta stated that "I think it is about time. It is fantastic as I feel the difference today is that women are standing up for women. I think that comes from a generation shift. The older generation was largely taught that women should be quiet and don't speak up; that they don't come to the forefront because they should be homemakers. Women today still do all of that. We always manage the home, take care of family, we are still the troubleshooters, we wear multiple hats in a day, we juggle a million works, and we don't let any of them drop. But now this generation of women have become more vocal, and they are empowering each other, which is a much better situation. I cannot stress enough about how essential it is to have a sisterhood, to support other women that are speaking up. Be unafraid and be unapologetic about the stand that you take, especially against male entitlement."

== Personal life ==
Dutta briefly dated American professional baseball player Derek Jeter. She had a nine-year relationship with actor and model Kelly Dorji. In 2008, she briefly dated actor and supermodel Dino Morea, but they broke up in 2009.

In September 2010, became engaged to Indian tennis player, Mahesh Bhupathi. They married on 16 February 2011 in a civil ceremony in Mumbai and followed it with a Christian ceremony on 20 February 2011 at Sunset Point in Goa. In August 2011, Dutta announced her pregnancy. On 20 January 2012, she gave birth to their daughter Saira Bhupathi.

== Filmography ==
Key
†	Denotes films that have not yet been released

- All films are in Hindi unless otherwise noted.

=== Films ===
Year	Film	Role	Notes	Ref.
2003	Andaaz	Kajal		
2003	Mumbai Se Aaya Mera Dost	Kesar		
2004	Khakee	Herself	Special appearance in the song "Aisa Jado"; footage reused in the Telugu film Satyameva Jayate	
2004	Masti	Monica Singh		
2004	Bardaasht	Advocate Payal		
2004	Arasatchi	Lara	Tamil film	
2004	Aan: Men at Work	Kiran Kumar		
2005	Insan	Meghna Malhotra		
2005	Elaan	Sonia Singh		
2005	Jurm	Sanjana Malhotra		
2005	Kaal	Ishika Malhotra		
2005	Ek Ajnabee	Adult Anamika	Special appearance	
2005	No Entry	Kaajal Singhania		
2005	Dosti: Friends Forever	Kajal Sharma		
2006	Zinda	Jenny Singh		
2006	Alag	Herself	Special appearance in the song "Sabse Alag"	
2006	Bhagam Bhag	Aditi Desai / Nisha Chauhan / Munni / Sheetal (Note: Dutta portrayed a single character with two or more names.)		
2006	Fanaa	Zeenat	Special appearance	
2007	Jhoom Barabar Jhoom	Anaida Raza / Laila		
2007	Partner	Naina Sahani		
2007	Om Shanti Om	Herself	Special appearance in the song "Deewangi Deewangi"	
2008	Jumbo	Sonia	Voice only	
2008	Rab Ne Bana Di Jodi	Herself	Special appearance in the song "Phir Milenge Chalte Chalte"	
2009	Billu Barber	Bindiya Rao Pardesi		
2009	Do Knot Disturb	Dolly		
2009	Blue	Mona		
2010	Housefull	Hetal Patel		
2011	Chalo Dilli	Mihika Banerjee	Also producer	
2011	Don 2	Ayesha		
2013	David	Neelam		
2013	David	Gayathri	Tamil film	
2015	Singh Is Bliing	Emily		
2016	Fitoor	Leena Becker	Special appearance	
2016	Azhar	Advocate Meera Verma		
2018	Welcome To New York	Sophia		
2021	Bell Bottom	Indira Gandhi		
2023	Ishq-e-Nadaan	Ramona Singh		
2026	Welcome to the Jungle	Ustad Tejaswini		
2026	Ramayana: Part 1	Kaikeyi		
TBA	Suryast †	Avantika	Post-production	

=== Television ===
Year	Film	Role	Notes	Ref.
2019	Beecham House	Begum Samru	English series	
2020	Hundred	ACP Saumya Shukla		
2021	Hiccups and Hookups	Vasudha		
2022	Kaun Banegi Shikharwati	Devyani Shikharwat Goel		
2023	Charlie Chopra & the Mystery of Solang Valley	Wilayat Hussain		
2024	Ranneeti: Balakot & Beyond	Manisha Bharadwaj		

== Accolades ==
Dutta is a recipient of Filmfare Award for Best Female Debut for Andaaz.

== See also ==
- List of Hindi film actresses
- Miss Universe

== Notes ==
Awards and achievements
Preceded by (Botswana) Mpule Kwelagobe	Miss Universe; 2000	Succeeded by (Puerto Rico) Denise Quiñones
Preceded by Gul Panag	Femina Miss India; 2000	Succeeded by Celina Jaitly
Preceded by (French Polynesia) Timeri Baudry	Miss Intercontinental; 1997	Succeeded by (Brazil) Janaína Berenhauser
