= Until the Sun Comes Up =

Single by Raghav featuring Abhishek Bachchan and Nelly
- Released: July 17, 2015
- Recorded: 2015
- Genre: Pop
- Length: 3:56
- Label: Mathurmatics Records Ltd.

Raghav singles chronology
"Take Me Away" (2014)	"Until the Sun Comes Up" (2015)

Abhishek Bachchan singles chronology
"Until the Sun Comes Up" (2015)

Nelly singles chronology
"Until the Sun Comes Up" (2015)

"Until the Sun Comes Up" is a 2015 bilingual single in English and Hindi language by Indian Canadian artist Raghav (full name Raghav Mathur) featuring additional vocals by Indian megastar actor and playback singer Abhishek Bachchan and American rapper, singer, songwriter Nelly.

== Background ==
The song was written on occasion of the United Nations declaring 2015 as International Year of Light (full name The International Year of Light and Light-based Technologies, 2015). Raghav offered the track as a collaboration with SolarAid, an international NGO working towards bringing solar light to remote villages that lack electricity and use hazardous kerosene lamps for lighting instead. In conjunction with Raghav, the charity helped provide solar light to 300 students in Shungubweni Secondary School in Tanzania.

Anticipation rose for the song when Raghav revealed big names like Bachchan and Nelly pitching in for the song's release. His press release asserted: "I hope people will look years from now at this song being a singular moment when East and West collaborated in a way that has a true global musical impact. And performing it with Nelly (who is a legend) and Abhishek (who is the most talented human I've ever met) makes this song even more special to me". Nelly on his part added: "Any collaboration is about the artist and the song, in this case I believe in both, but also the social awareness Raghav is trying to bring to an underreported issue. I'm very happy to be part of this". On the other hand, actor Abhishek Bachchan took to Twitter saying, "Really excited for you guys to hear this track. Thank you Raghav for giving me this opportunity to collaborate with two of my favourites. #RaghavNellyABbaby".

== Music videos ==
Raghav released a lyrics video on 19 July 2015 on his YouTube channel RaghavWorldwide. The lyrics video attracted more than 1 million views by August 20. A teaser trailer of the music video was posted on Raghav's channel on 5 August 2015 with an initial date for release of the official video set for 12 August 2015. Upon the request of international partners to ensure maximum impact for the promulgation of the video worldwide, the official date for release of single was postponed to 24 August 2015 when it was launched.

The official video for the song (4:46) were shot with Tanzanian children using solar-powered lighting. To support SolarAid's efforts, Raghav purchased and personally distributed over 300 solar lights to help the students in rural Tanzania. The music video starts with appeals from both Nelly and Abhishek Bachchan Nelly in support of the campaign.

Of his experience, Raghav said: "It was heartwarming. The lights help bring much needed support to families. The kids can now read into the night, study longer and hopefully reach a little higher and dream a bit bigger".
