= Jhoom Barabar Jhoom =

2007 film by Shaad Ali

- Theatrical release poster
- Directed by: Shaad Ali
- Written by: Habib Faisal
- Story by: Shaad Ali
- Produced by: Aditya Chopra
- Starring: Abhishek Bachchan; Preity Zinta; Bobby Deol; Lara Dutta
- Cinematography: Ayananka Bose
- Edited by: Ritesh Soni
- Music by: Shankar–Ehsaan–Loy
- Production company: Yash Raj Films
- Distributed by: Yash Raj Films
- Release date: 15 June 2007
- Running time: 132 minutes
- Country: India
- Language: Hindi
- Box office: ₹51.08 crore

Jhoom Barabar Jhoom (transl. Keep On Dancing) is a 2007 Indian Hindi-language musical romantic comedy film directed by Shaad Ali and produced by Aditya Chopra under the Yash Raj Films. Based on a story by Ali, with a screenplay by Habib Faisal, the film stars Abhishek Bachchan, Preity Zinta, Bobby Deol, and Lara Dutta, with Amitabh Bachchan appearing in a special appearance.

Released theatrically on 15 June 2007, Jhoom Barabar Jhoom received mixed critical reviews. Critics praised its soundtrack, costumes and cinematography, but critized its screenplay and cast performance. The film emerged as a moderate commercial success, grossing ₹38.4 crore (US$9.3 million) worldwide against a production budget of approximately ₹27 crore (US$6.6 million).

== Plot ==
The film opens with a mysterious Romani-like musician, leading a vibrant crowd at London's Waterloo station, dancing to the film's title track.

At the station, two strangers, Rakesh "Rikki" Thakkral and Alvira Khan, await the arrival of their respective fiancés on the same train. Rikki, a free-spirited Punjabi from Bathinda, now living in Southall, and Alvira, an upper-class Pakistani from Lahore, more culturally assimilated into British life, begin conversing to pass the time.

Rikki narrates how he met his fiancé, Anaida Raza, at the Hôtel Ritz Paris on the same fateful night that Princess Diana and Dodi Al-Fayed left the hotel for their last journey. He romantically declares that "when two lovers die, another two are born," explaining his instant love for Anaida. Alvira, meanwhile, shares her story about meeting her fiancé, a dashing lawyer named Steve Singh, at Madame Tussauds, where he saved her from a falling Superman wax figure. The incident supposedly led to a substantial lawsuit win, leaving Alvira infatuated with Steve.

As the conversation unfolds, Rikki and Alvira grow fond of each other, setting aside their different backgrounds. They part ways after exchanging contact details, believing their love is unrequited.

However, it is later revealed that Rikki is actually at the station to meet his business partner, while Alvira is waiting for her relatives. Both realize they have fallen for each other but assume the love is unreciprocated.

In an attempt to reconnect, Alvira makes a fake call to Rikki, which leads them to a meeting at a dance competition. To maintain their ruse, Rikki hires Laila, a prostitute, to pose as his fiancée, while Alvira blackmails her coworker, Satvinder, into pretending to be hers. The four meet at the disco, exchanging barbs and competing on the dance floor. Rikki and Laila win the contest, prompting Alvira to leave in tears.

Later, Satvinder visits Rikki and reveals that he has genuinely fallen for Laila and that Alvira is not engaged to him. Realizing the truth, Rikki rushes to Alvira, and after a brief misunderstanding, they confess their love and begin dating, while Satvinder and Laila head to Hollywood.

The film concludes with the enigmatic gypsy musician revealing that Rikki and Alvira invented stories about their fictitious lovers, inspired by Alvira's newspaper and Rikki's comic book.

== Cast ==
- Abhishek Bachchan as Rakesh "Rikki" Thakral
- Preity Zinta as Alvira Khan
- Bobby Deol as Satvinder "Steve" Singh
- Lara Dutta as Anaida Raza / Laila
- Amitabh Bachchan as a man singing at the train station (special appearance)
- Piyush Mishra as Hafeez Huffy Bhai
- Ameet Chana as Shahriyar
- Meera Syal as Satvinder's mother
- Sanjeev Bhaskar as Shopkeeper
- Sagar Arya as Neil
- Sudhir as Contest Co-announcer

== Production ==
=== Development ===
Director Shaad Ali began pre-production for Jhoom Barabar Jhoom in 2005 while working on Bunty Aur Babli (2005). Originally it was titled Sangam Mein.

=== Casting ===
Abhishek Bachchan was the first actor to be cast. Vidya Balan and Priyanka Chopra were approached for the role of Anaida Raza, and John Abraham was considered for the role of Steve Singh, but all declined. The roles eventually went to Lara Dutta and Bobby Deol. Amitabh Bachchan made a special appearance.

The film marked the first pairing of Bachchan and Preity Zinta. It was also the first collaboration between Bachchan and Deol. The film reunited Deol with Zinta after Soldier (1998), and Bachchan with Dutta after Mumbai Se Aaya Mera Dost (2003).

=== Filming ===
Filming commenced in the latter half of 2006, with principal photography in London, including scenes at Waterloo Station and other areas in North London. Some schedules also took place in Paris and Agra. Choreography was handled by Vaibhavi Merchant.

== Release ==
=== Release ===
Jhoom Barabar Jhoom was released theatrically on 15 June 2007 across multiple countries. The film was distributed by Yash Raj Films and had a runtime of 132 minutes.

== Reception ==
=== Box office ===
Jhoom Barabar Jhoom earned ₹4.47 crore on its opening day and ₹13.93 crore over its opening weekend. It grossed ₹37.88 crore.

Internationally, the film grossed ₹485,250,000 (US$5.0 million).

=== Critical response ===
On Rotten Tomatoes, the film holds an approval rating of 43% based on 14 reviews.

Taran Adarsh of Bollywood Hungama rated the film 1.5 out of 5, writing, "Jhoom Barabar Jhoom is all gloss, no substance. Body beautiful, minus soul". The Hindustan Times gave it 2 out of 5, remarking, "With so much hair-and-there going on, the film could have very well been titled Jhoom Barber Jhoom". Sukanya Verma of Rediff.com awarded it 2.5 out of 5 and described it as "a lavishly produced concert".

Rachel Saltz of The New York Times described the film as "a giddy romantic comedy with star power,". Poonam Joshi of the BBC said the film had "no point to the story though, this one's just for fun," while calling the humour "contrived". Joshua Land of Time Out summarized the film as a "nonsensical plot that follows—which at least has the virtue of not pretending to be anything more than a flimsy excuse for a series of lengthy music-video-style song-and-dance numbers—somehow culminates, in singular Bollywood fashion, with a climactic dance-off".

== Awards ==
Award	Date	Category	Nominee	Result	Ref.
Stardust Awards	26 January 2008	Best Supporting Actress	Lara Dutta	Nominated	
Annual Central European Bollywood Awards, India	8 March 2008	Best Supporting Actress	Lara Dutta	Nominated	
Zee Cine Awards	26 April 2008	Best Supporting Actor	Bobby Deol	Nominated	
Zee Cine Awards	26 April 2008	Best Supporting Actress	Lara Dutta	Nominated	
Zee Cine Awards	26 April 2008	Best Female Playback Singer	Mahalakshmi Iyer	Nominated	

== Soundtrack ==
Jhoom Barabar Jhoom

Studio album by Shankar–Ehsaan–Loy
- Released: 15 May 2007 (Digital Release); 15 June 2007 (Film Release)
- Recorded: 8 March 2007
- Genre: Feature film soundtrack
- Label: Yash Raj Music
- Producer: Shankar–Ehsaan–Loy

Shankar–Ehsaan–Loy chronology
Don - The Chase Begins Again (2006)	Jhoom Barabar Jhoom (2007)	Marigold (2007)

=== Development ===
This is the third directorial venture of Shaad Ali, and second with Shankar–Ehsaan–Loy, after the crime comedy Bunty Aur Babli (2005). The album has a dhol-oriented sound. Santoor, sarangi and flute were used for the melody "Bol Na Halke Halke" and Mahalakshmi Iyer has sung in a lower key. "Ticket to Hollywood" has a hip hop feel to it, while "Kiss of Love" is a zingy and rambunctious. "JBJ" is the techno song during the climax scenes of the movie, which is picturized on Abhishek Bachchan, Preity Zinta, Bobby Deol and Lara Dutta. "Jhoom Jam" is the only instrumental in the album, which as title suggests, is the 'jam of the instrumental version of all track of the album.

=== Release history ===
The album was released on 15 May 2007 by Yash Raj Music in multiple formats, including music cassette, audio CD, DVD-Audio, and digital download.

=== Tracklist ===
All lyrics were written by Gulzar.

Song	Singer(s)	Duration
"Jhoom"	Shankar Mahadevan	5:21
"Kiss of Love"	Vishal Dadlani & Vasundhara Das	5:05
"Ticket to Hollywood"	Neeraj Shridhar & Alisha Chinai	4:38
"JBJ"	Zubeen Garg, Shankar Mahadevan & Sunidhi Chauhan	4:22
"Bol Na Halke Halke"	Rahat Fateh Ali Khan & Mahalakshmi Iyer	4:54
"Jhoom Barabar Jhoom"	KK, Sukhwinder Singh, Mahalakshmi Iyer, Shankar Mahadevan	7:04
"Jhoom Jam"	Instrumental	3:50

=== Reception ===
Professional ratings
Review scores
Source	Rating
Bollywood Hungama	4/5 stars
Business of Cinema	4/5 stars

Joginder Tuteja of Bollywood Hungama said, Jhoom Barabar Jhoom is an album that has chartbuster written on it in bold letters. There are some albums that take time to register with music lovers. There are some that require the strong word of mouth to carry them forward. There are some which are destined to be popular in the very first listening. Jhoom Barabar Jhoom of course belongs to the last category. Sukanya Verma of Rediff described the album as high on melody, entertainment and attitude. Sanjay Ram of Businessofcinema.com stated that the album is positively a must-buy.

The album featured in the list of "Top 10 Soundtracks of 2007" by Bollywood Hungama and Rediff.

=== Chart performance ===
The music for the film entered the charts at #6 and in its second week climbed to #5. By the first week of July, the album topped the music charts and stayed there for 2 weeks. Despite the poor response to the film, the music received high acclaim. On the week beginning 23 July, the album was placed at #3. On the week beginning 17 September, the soundtrack dropped to #10. According to the Indian trade website Box Office India, with around 1,700,000 units sold, this film's soundtrack album was the year's fourth highest-selling.

== See also ==
- List of films set in London
