= Ranneeti: Balakot & Beyond =

- Genre: War drama
- Based on: Balakot airstrike
- Screenplay by: Aniruddha Guha
- Story by: Sanjay Chopra, Sudeep Nigam
- Directed by: Santosh Singh
- Starring: Ashish Vidyarthi Ashutosh Rana Lara Dutta Jimmy Sheirgill Prasanna
- Music by: Joel Crasto
- Country of origin: India
- Original language: Hindi
- No. of seasons: 1
- No. of episodes: 9

Production
- Executive producer: Bandissh Rajyaguru
- Producers: Comall Sunjoy Waddhwa; Sunnjana Waadhwaa; Sunjoy Waddhwa
- Cinematography: Tanveer Mir
- Editor: Unnikrishnan Payoor Parameswaran
- Production companies: Clockwork Film; Sphereorigins Multivision

Original release
- Network: JioCinema
- Release: 25 April 2024

Ranneeti: Balakot & Beyond is a Hindi-language war drama streaming television series directed by Santosh Singh for JioCinema. The series stars Ashutosh Rana, Ashish Vidyarthi, Jimmy Shergill, Lara Dutta, Aakanksha Singh, Mir Sarwar, Prasanna, Sikandar Kharbanda and others. The series was premeiered on 25 April 2024 on JioCinema.

== Plot ==
The show centers on an R&AW agent and his group as they retaliate against Pakistan following the devastating Pulwama assault. In the midst of hybrid warfare and Pakistan's deceptions in the media, the spies attempt to rescue a captured pilot while exposing the cunning neighbor.

== Cast ==
- Ashish Vidyarthi as NSA chief Madhusudan Dutta
- Ashutosh Rana as Raqib Hamid Askani
- Jimmy Sheirgill as Kashyap Sinha
- Lara Dutta as Manisha Bharadwaj
- Ashok Kumar Beniwal as Mir Gul
- Aakanksha Singh as Richa Singh
- Elnaaz Norouzi as Fahima Naqvi / Netra Dhar, R&AW agent
- Jason Tham as Victor Maisnam
- Mandeep Singh as Major General Arif Ghafaar, portraying Pakistani military spokesman Major General Asif Ghafoor
- Mark Bennington as Nick Campbel
- Mir Sarwar as Hammad Wadhera
- Mohit Chauhan as Indian Prime Minister
- Prasanna as Wing commander Abhimanyu Vardhan, portraying Abhinandan Varthaman
- Priya Bathija as Aayesha
- Purnendu Bhattacharya as Air Marshal Hari Kumar
- Rajendra Bhatia as Balvinder Singh Gill
- Satyajeet Dubey as Iqbal Dar / Kabir Mir, a RAW agent
- Sandeep Chatterjee as Asif Gazali
- Samvedna Suwalka as Shireen
- Saadhika Syal as Zara Rizvi
- Shahid Malik as Ehtesham
- Smaran Sahu as Wing commander Haider
- Snehil Dixit Mehra as Shipra
- Spruha Joshi as Poonam Sinha
- Suneel Sinha as Gurtek Sodhi
- Uday Tikekar as Pakistani Prime Minister, portraying Imran Khan
- Umar Sharif as Yakub
- Vibhor Sharma as Captain Ashish Houda
- Samvedna Suwalka as shireen
- Jiten Lalwani as Pakistan Air Chief Marshal Anwar Khan, portraying PAF Chief Mujahid Anwar Khan

== Production ==
The series was announced by Lara Dutta on 13 August 2023. On that day, Dutta also shared the first teaser of the series. The official teaser was released on 26 February 2024.

== Release ==
The series was released on 25 April 2024 on JioCinema with dubbed versions in Kannada, Marathi and Bengali languages.

== Critical reception ==
Shubhra Gupta of The Indian Express gave the series 1.5 stars and stated that "Another cross-border sub-plot featuring a couple of undercover agents has car chases, and shoot-outs, and fireworks. This ratchets the temperature a little, which overall remains tepid, and predictable."

Deepa Gahlot of Rediff.com rated 2.5 stars to the series and opined that "Balakot And Beyond veers between intriguing and boring."

Dhaval Roy of The Times of India rated 3.5/5 and stated that "The series does have a few predictable and far-fetched moments, especially regarding one of its pivotal characters."

Vinamra Mathur of Firstpost rated 2.5/5 and wrote in his review "The aerial action, most recently seen in Operation Valentine and Fighter, fail to ignite any sense of panic or patriotism."

Rishil Jogani for Pinkvilla rated 3/5 and wrote that "A show like Ranneeti has very little margin for error because it is inspired by true events and something that is added only for dramatic effect, makes it less believable, overall."
