= My Kinda Girl (Raghav song) =

Single by Raghav & Redman

from the album Identity
- Released: October 13, 2008
- Recorded: 2008
- Genre: Dance; pop; R&B; hip hop
- Length: 3:40
- Label: A&R Records
- Songwriters: Raghav; Mushtaq Omar Uddin
- Producer: Mushtaq Omar Uddin

Raghav & Redman singles chronology
"Angel Eyes" (2005)	"My Kinda Girl" (2008)	"Humrahee" (2009)

Music video
- "My Kinda Girl" on YouTube

"My Kinda Girl" is the first single from the Canadian singer Raghav's second album, Identity. The song features the American rapper, Redman. The song was released on October 4, 2008 in India and then officially released internationally on October 13 and 14, 2008 respectively. The song's music is partially inspired from Bollywood song "Choli Ke Peeche Kya Hai" from the soundtrack of the 1993 film Khalnayak.

== Music video ==
The video has a guest appearance from American rapper, Redman and the video starts with a girl coming to a diamond exhibition. Raghav is dressed as a guest and is in the exhibition hall and Redman is rapping while the girl (apparently a celebrity) walks on the red carpet. Redman tried to enter the exhibition but the security stops him. Raghav spills a drink on the girl's clothes and the girl goes in to change them but she wears a robber's costume inside and successfully gets past the high level security and the lasers and robs the diamond.

Raghav switches off the power supply and gets in the car with the diamond and his partners-in-crime Redman and the girl. The girl comes and sit in Raghav's car giving him the diamond.

== Track listing ==
- "My Kinda Girl"
- "My Kinda Girl (Punjabi Hit Squad Remix)"
- "My Kinda Girl (Flip N Spin Remix)"

All three tracks appear on the Identity album.
