= Iceberg Slimm =

British rapper and writer

- Also known as: Iceberg Slimm
- Born: Duane Dyer; 1978 (age 47–48); London
- Origin: Hackney, London, England
- Genre: Hip hop
- Occupations: Rapper; poet; writer; producer; CEO
- Instrument: Vocals
- Years active: 1998–present
- Label: A&R/V2 Records/Polydor Records/Frojak Entertainment
- Website: http://www.icebergslimmworldwide.com

Duane Dyer, better known by his stage name, Iceberg Slimm (born 1978) is a Black British rapper and founder of Frojak Entertainment who is best known for his singles "Nursery Rhymes", "Bad Boy" and "Starship" taken from his debut album, Da World on Ice. He also featured on Raghav's single, "Can't Get Enough" which charted at No. 10 in the UK Singles Chart.

Becoming one of the first rappers to ever sign to a major label in the 2000’s, his breakthrough single “Nursery Rhymes” (1999) reached No.37 in the UK Top 40 charts. This was followed by the Top 10 hit “Can’t Get Enough” with Raghav and followed by “Starship” featuring Coree from R&B group Damage also charting in the Top 40.

In October 2026, he released "CEO" a new single produced by Dready, a longtime affiliate of So Solid Crew, “CEO” is a hip-hop record that aims to emulate classic british hip-hop. Alongside the original version, Iceberg has also recorded an international version featuring Raghav, who introduced the record to the South Asian audiences. Blazin Squad member Marcel “Rocky B” also produced a remix of "CEO" for DMODE productions. He was interviewed by wordplay on the single.

In 2009, Iceberg Slimm put his recording career on hold after his father was diagnosed with pancreatic cancer. Before he died, his father asked him to build a career that would allow him to remain in the UK and be present for his younger siblings and his son as they grew up.

Instead of pursuing the music industry full-time, he earned a Bachelor’s degree with Honours in Education alongside qualifications in child psychology. He went on to dedicate his career to supporting permanently excluded students, young people affected by gang culture, and children with Special Educational Needs and Disabilities (SEND), working across London boroughs to make a lasting difference away from the spotlight.

Although absent from commercial releases, Iceberg continued performing internationally alongside Raghav, touring throughout the UK, Europe, the Middle East, Asia and North America gaining popularity in the South Asian and Desi music scene.

== Discography ==
=== Albums ===
- 2004: Da World on Ice
- 2012: Higher (promotional use only)

=== Singles/Features ===
- "Nursery Rhymes" (2000) (UK Charted No.37)
- Shola Ama - "Imagine" Feat Iceberg Slimm (2000) (UK Charted No.24)
- Eve - "Who's That Girl" UK Feat Iceberg Slimm (2001) (unreleased) (UK Charted No.6)
- Damage - "Rumours" Feat Iceberg Slimm (2002) (UK Charted No.22)
- Damage - "So What if I" Feat Iceberg Slimm (2002) (UK Charted No.12)
- Hil St Soul - "All That & A Bag O' Chips" Feat Iceberg Slimm (2002) (UK Charted No. 81)
- "Badboy" (2002)
- "Shut U Down" (2002)
- "Reminisce with Me Ft Urban Lady" (2003)
- Raghav - "Cant Get Enough" Feat Iceberg Slimm (2004) (UK Charted No. 10)
- "Starship" (2004) (UK Charted No. 73)
- "Lonely (Da Break Up Song)" (featuring Raghav and D'Vinci) (2007)
- "Shake Dat Thing" (2007)
- "Where I'm From" (2007)
- "I Have a Dream" Feat Sonna Rele (2009)
- Raghav - "Once" Feat Iceberg Slimm (2009)
- "CEO" (2026)
- "CEO" Ft Raghav (2026)
- "CEO" DMODE Afro House Mix (2026)
