= I Want to Talk =

2024 Indian film by Shoojit Sircar

- Directed by: Shoojit Sircar
- Written by: Ritesh Shah
- Produced by: Sheel Kumar; Ronnie Lahiri; Kumar Thakur; Karan Wadhwa
- Starring: Abhishek Bachchan; Ahilya Bamroo; Pearle Dey; Johnny Lever
- Cinematography: Avik Mukhopadhyay
- Edited by: Chandrashekhar Prajapati
- Music by: Score: George Joseph; Koyna; Songs: Taba Chake
- Production companies: Rising Sun Films; Kino Works
- Distributed by: PVR Inox Pictures
- Release date: 22 November 2024
- Running time: 122 minutes
- Country: India
- Language: Hindi
- Box office: est. ₹12.5 million

I Want to Talk is a 2024 Indian Hindi-language drama film directed by Shoojit Sircar, written by Ritesh Shah and produced by Rising Sun Films and Kino Works. The film stars Abhishek Bachchan in the lead role and is based on the true story of Arjun Sen, a cancer survivor facing life-altering surgery as well as navigating a complex relationship with his daughter since her childhood. Principal photography took place in California. The trailer was launched on 5 November 2024.

The film was released in theaters on 22 November 2024. Despite positive reviews from critics the film emerged as a box-office-bomb, earning only ₹12.5 million at the box office. At the 70th Filmfare Awards, the film received 8 nominations, including Critics Best Film, Best Actor (Bachchan), and Best Female Debut, (Bamroo), winning Best Actor and Best Adapted Screenplay.

== Plot ==
Arjun Sen, a USA-based NRI facing life-altering surgery, looks at the brighter side of life whilst navigating a complex relationship with his daughter (Reya) as a single parent. His wife divorces him leading them to co-parent their daughter Reya. He has undergone 20 surgeries starting with laryngeal cancer. Despite surgery, the cancer spreads all over his body affecting his colon and stomach. Amid all this, he has to deal with Reya, going through the pangs of growing up. Constant visits to the hospital and not opening up about the same to her creates a gap between them.

One day, when Reya makes a diagram of those close to her and places Arjun in the eighth circle. It makes Arjun sit up and think about his relationship with Reya. Following his diagnosis, Arjun ends up losing his marketing job but finds a confidante in his nurse, Nancy (Kristin Goodard). Doctors tell him that he won't live for more than 100 days but he keeps at it despite planning a suicide at one point. However, his neighbours gossip that it's all drama to seek attention, and Arjun's friend considers his surgeries lucky for his business.

Through his diagnosis, Arjun meets Dr Jayant Deb, and their relationship becomes a rollercoaster ride. Arjun miraculously defies all medical journals and theories and goes on to live a life that's one for the books. He celebrates each day and has a sarcastic and deadpan sense of humour. His daughter Reya becomes his anchor and support and it's through his illness that the dents in his relationship with her are healed.

== Cast ==
- Abhishek Bachchan as Arjun Sen
- Pearle Dey as child Reya (the daughter)
- Ahilya Bamroo as Reya Sen (the daughter)
- Johnny Lever as Johny
- Jayant Kripalani as Dr. Jayant Deb
- Kristin Goddard as Nancy
- Dr Saivishnu Doosetty as Surgeon
- Dr. Smit Patel as Surgeon
- Dr. Raghav Dhawan as Physician
- Dr. Tamanna Mohta as Physician
- Nathalie Zepek as Physician
- Tamara Loera as a Nurse
- David Moskowitz
- Tom McLaren
- Janet Carter
- Joe Russell
- Nicholas Wagner
- Julia Megan Sullivan
- Indeepa Singh
- Billy Minshall
- Robert Ramirez
- Charles Karafotas
- Mike Sears
- Caprice Ott
- Eliza Kim
- Ian Schuelke
- Nirvan Patnaik

== Soundtrack ==
I Want to Talk

Soundtrack album by Taba Chake
- Released: 12 November 2024
- Recorded: 2023–2024
- Studio: Times Music
- Genre: Feature film soundtrack
- Length: 15:12
- Language: Hindi
- Label: Junglee Music
- Producers: Sheel Kumar; Ronnie Lahiri; Kumar Thakur; Karan Wadhwa

The background score of the film is composed by George Joseph, whereas the soundtrack is composed by musician Taba Chake who is also the singer and lyricist. The first single titled "Dil Ghabraye" was released on 11 November 2024. The second single titled "Gum Ho Kahan" was released on 14 November 2024.

Track listing
No.	Title	Lyrics	Music	Singer(s)	Length
1.	"Dil Ghabraye"	Taba Chake	Taba Chake	Taba Chake	2:42
2.	"Gum Ho Kahan"	Taba Chake	Taba Chake	Taba Chake	2:40
3.	"Musafir"	Taba Chake	Taba Chake	Taba Chake	3:17
4.	"Manzil Ki Ore"	Taba Chake	Taba Chake	Taba Chake, Toko Sama	3:27
5.	"Pal Yeh Mere"	Taba Chake	Taba Chake	Taba Chake	3:03
Total length:					15:12

== Release ==
=== Theatrical ===
The film was earlier scheduled to release on 15 November 2024 but was postponed and was then released in theaters on 22 November 2024.

=== Home media ===
The digital streaming rights of the film were acquired by Amazon Prime Video.

== Reception ==
=== Critical response ===
I Want to Talk received positive reviews from critics, with praise for Bachchan's performance. On the review aggregator website Rotten Tomatoes, 73% of 11 critics' reviews are positive, with an average rating of 6/10.

Catherine Bray of The Guardian gave 2 stars out of 5 and said "A greater degree of setup would have given this story of a Don Draper type’s determination to beat a terminal diagnosis more dramatic heft". Sukanya Verma of Rediff.com gave 3.5 stars out of 5 and observed that "Abhishek Bachchan conveys the numerous chapters and challenges of his mind, body and soul with a never-before candour".

Shubhra Gupta of The Indian Express gave 2.5/5 stars and observed that "Abhishek Bachchan lets go of vanity, revealing a thickened gut, and scars-on-the-belly, and an ability to bare. But Shoojit Sircar's film leaves you wanting more.". Devesh Sharma of Filmfare rated 4.5/5 stars praises the performance saying "The actor has completely immersed himself in the character, showcasing a side of Abhishek we haven't seen in quite some time. Watch it to appreciate the exceptional acting and the subtle yet impactful message it delivers.". Bollywood Hungama gave 2.5 stars out of 5 but praising the acting performance of Abhishek Bachchan saying "Abhishek Bachchan delivers one of the greatest performances of his career. One forgets that one is watching Abhishek on screen as he goes into the skin of his character effortlessly.".

Rishabh Suri of Hindustan Times said about the film that "Bachchan fully utilizes his real-life demeanor as a chill guy with some of the best one-liners in the room, for his character.". Zinia Bandyopadhyay of India Today gave 4 stars out of 5 and said "Shoojit Sircar masterfully uses silence to enhance Arjun Sen's story in I Want To Talk and Abhishek Bachchan delivers a flawless performance as Arjun Sen. Renuka Vyavahare of The Times of India rated 3.5/5 stars and said "In book terms, ‘I want to talk’ may not be a page-turner but it's not a sob story either. It reminds you that you are way more stronger than you think you are". Vinamra Mathur of Firstpost said in his review that "The film offers a poignant exploration of pain, resilience, sorrow, and determination. Told through Abhishek Bachchan's perspective and narrated in his voice, the frequent voiceovers are fitting, as they reflect the only moments he can express himself freely."

Anuj Kumar of The Hindu wrote in his review "Caught between moments of introspection and inertia, Shoojit Sircar's human drama on the impermanence of life and relationships struggles to find its bearings". Nandini Ramnath of Scroll.in observe that "The film focuses on the disruptive impact of serious illnesses rather than being a typical feel-good drama. Its most impactful moment comes during Arjun’s marathon, highlighting his bravery, physical effort, and Abhishek Bachchan’s strong performance."

== Accolades ==
Year (Note: Refers to the year in which the ceremony was held.)	Award	Category	Recipient(s)	Result	Ref.
2025	70th Filmfare Awards	Best Film (Critics)	Shoojit Sircar	Won	
2025	70th Filmfare Awards	Best Actor	Abhishek Bachchan	Won	
2025	70th Filmfare Awards	Best Actor (Critics)	Abhishek Bachchan	Nominated	
2025	70th Filmfare Awards	Best Supporting Actress	Ahilya Bamroo	Nominated	
2025	70th Filmfare Awards	Best Female Debut	Ahilya Bamroo	Nominated	
2025	70th Filmfare Awards	Best Cinematography	Avik Mukhopadhyay	Nominated	
2025	70th Filmfare Awards	Best Dialogue	Ritesh Shah	Nominated	
2025	70th Filmfare Awards	Best Adapted Screenplay	Ritesh Shah, Tushar Sheetal Jain	Won	
2025	25th IIFA Awards	Best Actor	Abhishek Bachchan	Nominated	
