= Stardust Award for Best Actress =

Film award in India

The Stardust Searchlight Award for Best Actress is chosen by the readers of the Indian magazine Stardust. The award honours a star that has made an impact with their acting in a given film.

Here is a list of the award winners and the films for which they won.

Year	Actress	Film
2009	Amrita Rao	Welcome to Sajjanpur
2010	Preity Zinta	Videsh
2011	Neetu Kapoor	Do Dooni Chaar
2012	Shraddha Kapoor	Luv Ka The End
2013	Farah Khan	Shirin Farhad Ki Toh Nikal Padi
2014	no award	no award
2015	Kangana Ranaut	Queen
2016	Deepika Padukone	Piku/Tamasha
2017	Anushka Sharma	Sultan/Ae Dil Hai Mushkil
2018	Kriti Sanon	Bareilly Ki Barfi/Raabta

== See also ==
- Stardust Awards
- Bollywood
- Cinema of India
