= Charles Smith (songwriter) =

American songwriter

D'Vinci aka Davinci
- Born: Charles Smith
- Origin: United States
- Genres: Hip hop, R&B, pop
- Occupations: Songwriter, producer
- Instrument: Logic Pro

Charles Smith, also known as D'Vinci or Davinci, is an American record producer and songwriter. He has written and produced music for such artists as Ginuwine, Christina Milian, Fabulous and Grammy award winning artist Jill Scott. D'Vinci has production credits on the multi-platinum selling soundtrack for Save the Last Dance. He has also worked with international artists, co-writing the double platinum single "One Last" for Singapore Idol star Taufik. D'Vinci worked as the primary producer with rapper Fredro Starr on his solo album Firestarr.

Smith has also worked on music for various television and film projects including the Beacon Pictures produced Uncle P, starring Lil Romeo and Master P., Dirty Deeds starring Zoe Saldaña and Milo Ventimiglia and the Dimension Films release Make It Happen.
