= Abhishek Bachchan =

Indian actor and film producer (born 1976)

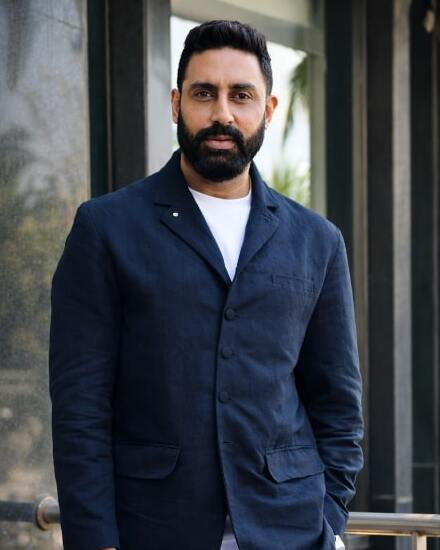
- Bachchan in 2025
- Born: Abhishek Amitabh Bachchan; 5 February 1976 (age 50); Bombay, Maharashtra, India
- Occupations: Actor; film producer
- Years active: 2000–present
- Works: Full list
- Spouse: Aishwarya Rai (m. 2007)
- Children: 1
- Parents: Amitabh Bachchan (father); Jaya Bhaduri (mother)
- Family: Bachchan family
- Awards: Full list

Abhishek Amitabh Bachchan (pronounced [əbʰɪʂeːk əmɪˈt̪ɑːbʱ ˈbətːʃən]; born 5 February 1976) is an Indian actor, film producer, and voice artist known for his work in Hindi films. Part of the Bachchan family, he is the son of actors Amitabh Bachchan and Jaya Bachchan. From 2012 to 2016, Bachchan appeared in Forbes India's Celebrity 100 list, based on his income and popularity.

Bachchan began his career with the moderately successful drama film Refugee (2000), which was followed by a dozen unsuccessful ventures. His career prospects changed in 2004 with the action film Dhoom, and he received critical acclaim for his performances in the dramas Yuva (2004), Sarkar (2005), and Kabhi Alvida Naa Kehna (2006), winning three consecutive Filmfare Awards for Best Supporting Actor. His biggest successes as a sole male lead came with the comedy Bunty Aur Babli (2005) and the drama Guru (2007), both earning him nominations for the Filmfare Award for Best Actor.

Bachchan's other commercially successful films include the ensemble action films Dus (2005), Dhoom 2 (2006) and Dhoom 3 (2013), and the comedies Dostana (2008), Bol Bachchan (2012), Happy New Year (2014) and Housefull 3 (2016). He has since starred in the streaming ventures Breathe: Into the Shadows (2020), Ludo (2020) and Dasvi (2022), with the lattermost earning him the Filmfare OTT Award for Best Actor in a Web Original Film (Male). Bachchan received praise for his performances in the small-scale dramas Ghoomer (2023) and I Want to Talk (2024). The latter earned him his first Filmfare Award for Best Actor.

In addition to his four Filmfare Awards, Bachchan won the National Film Award for Best Hindi Feature Film for producing the comedy-drama Paa (2009). Bachchan is married to actress Aishwarya Rai, with whom he has a daughter.

== Early life and family ==
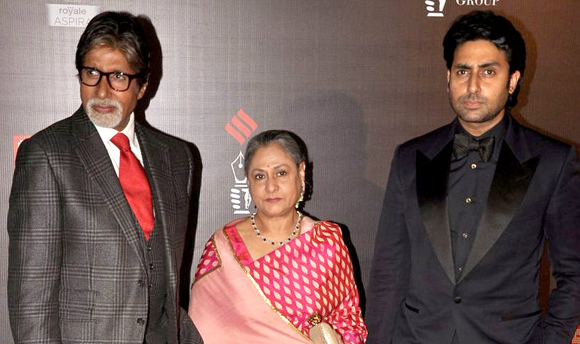
Bachchan with his parents Amitabh and Jaya Bachchan in February 2014

Abhishek Bachchan was born on 5 February 1976 in Bombay (Mumbai) to veteran actors of Hindi cinema, Amitabh Bachchan and Jaya Bachchan. He has a sister, Shweta Bachchan. His grandfather, Harivansh Rai Bachchan, was a noted poet of the Nayi Kavita Literary Movement of the Hindi literature and professor at the Allahabad University in Uttar Pradesh, while his grandmother, Teji Bachchan, was a social activist. The original surname of his family is Srivastava, Bachchan being the pen name used by his grandfather. However, when Amitabh entered films, he did so under his father's pen name. Bachchan is of Awadhi and Punjabi heritage on his father's side, and Bengali from his mother's side. His maternal grandfather was Taroon Kumar Bhaduri, a famous author, and poet. TK Bhaduri wrote a famous book Obhishopto Chambol (Cursed Chambal), an account of his experiences as a journalist/writer in the area. This book provided the raw material and inspiration to almost all dacoit-related films made by the Hindi film industry in India.

Bachchan attended Jamnabai Narsee School and Bombay Scottish School in Mumbai, Modern School, Vasant Vihar, New Delhi, and Aiglon College in Switzerland. He then attended Boston University but left prior to completing degree to support family during bankruptcy of ABCL. He subsequently moved on to Bollywood. He was diagnosed with dyslexia at the age of 9.

== Career ==
=== 2000–2003: Debut and initial struggles ===
In 2000, Bachchan made his film debut playing the male lead in J. P. Dutta's war drama Refugee opposite Kareena Kapoor, who was also making her debut in the film. Although the film was an average grosser at the box office, both Bachchan and Kapoor received positive reviews for their performances. Film critic Taran Adarsh of Bollywood Hungama wrote that he "has all it takes to emerge a competent actor in years to come. Even in his debut-making film, Abhishek comes across as a fine actor and lives up to his family name." Bachchan next appeared opposite Keerthi Reddy in Tera Jadoo Chal Gayaa, portraying an artist who falls in a one-sided love. The movie was neither commercially nor critically well-received. His third release of the year, Dhai Akshar Prem Ke, was a remake of the 1995 American film A Walk in the Clouds and turned out to be a box office flop. In 2001, he starred in Bas Itna Sa Khwaab Hai, which failed to gain a wide audience theatrically. He also shot for a cameo in the 2001 film Kabhi Khushi Kabhie Gham, a scene which was later edited out of the film.

In 2002, Bachchan had four film releases, the first of which was the romantic drama Haan Maine Bhi Pyaar Kiya, opposite Karisma Kapoor and Akshay Kumar. He then made a cameo in the Bengali film Desh, which starred his mother Jaya Bachchan. His next role was in the comedy drama Shararat, followed by Om Jai Jagadish, where he was part of an ensemble cast. Both movies failed commercially. Bachchan's performance in Sooraj R. Barjatya's romantic dramedy Main Prem Ki Diwani Hoon (2003) earned him his first nomination for the Filmfare Award for Best Supporting Actor, although the film was a flop. In the same year, Bachchan starred alongside Lara Dutta in the drama Mumbai Se Aaya Mera Dost. The movie did not perform well commercially and received negative reviews. He then starred opposite Aishwarya Rai in Kuch Naa Kaho and joined Ajay Devgn and Bipasha Basu in Zameen. Neither of these films fared well critically or commercially. For his final release of 2003, Bachchan appeared among an ensemble cast in LOC: Kargil, portraying Vikram Batra. It received mixed to negative reviews and was not a commercial success.

=== 2004–2009: Breakthrough ===
Bachchan's first project in 2004, Run, emerged as a critical and commercial failure. He then starred in Mani Ratnam's political drama Yuva (2004), which had a below average performance at the box office, but earned Bachchan his first Filmfare Award for Best Supporting Actor. He then made a cameo in the romantic comedy-drama Hum Tum, and starred alongside Shilpa Shetty and Salman Khan in the AIDS drama Phir Milenge. Although not commercially successful, the film earned Bachchan the Zee Cine Award for Best Actor in a Supporting Role – Male. Bachchan better established himself in Hindi cinema playing a no-nonsense Mumbai police officer in the hit action thriller Dhoom (2004), which also starred John Abraham, Uday Chopra, Esha Deol, and Rimi Sen in pivotal roles. His next release, Naach (2004), was poorly received by critics and the audience alike.

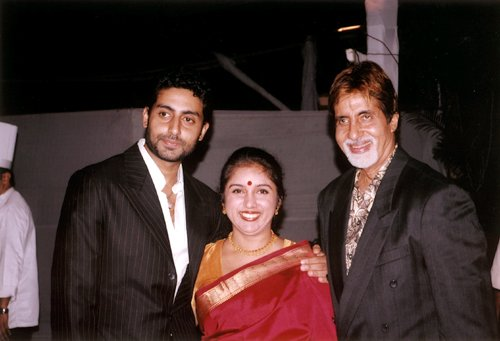
From left to right: Abhishek Bachchan, Revathi, and Amitabh Bachchan at an event marking the audio release of Dil Jo Bhi Kahey..., 2005

Bachchan's first release of 2005 was the crime comedy Bunty Aur Babli, which featured him and Rani Mukerji as the titular con artist duo who perform several successful heists and fall in love along the way. The film emerged as the second highest-grossing Hindi film of 2005 and earned him his first nomination for the Filmfare Award for Best Actor. This film also marked his first professional collaboration with his father Amitabh Bachchan, who played a police officer closely following the lead pair. Bachchan was next seen in Ram Gopal Varma's political drama Sarkar, which was a moderate success at the box office. His performance as the morally upright son of a troubled politician (played by his father Amitabh Bachchan) earned him rave reviews from critics as well as his second consecutive Filmfare Award for Best Supporting Actor. His next two releases Dus (2005) and Bluffmaster! (2005) were both moderately successful, but did not earn much critical appreciation. The year also saw Bachchan making cameos in the romantic comedy Salaam Namaste, the Bengali film Antarmahal, the comedy Home Delivery, the action thriller Ek Ajnabee, and the romantic comedy Neal 'n' Nikki.

Bachchan won his third consecutive Filmfare Award for Best Supporting Actor for his performance in Karan Johar's ensemble musical romantic drama Kabhi Alvida Naa Kehna (2006), which focused on the subjects of marital infidelity, emotional dissatisfaction, and dysfunctional relationships. Bachchan played the role of a PR associate whose wife (Rani Mukerji) is unhappy with their marriage, and so begins an extra-marital affair with a friend (Shah Rukh Khan) who is also unhappy with his marriage to his wife (Preity Zinta). Kabhi Alvida Naa Kehna was a popular release, earning over ₹1.13 billion (US$12 million) to emerge as the highest-grossing Hindi film in overseas markets to that point. Bachchan then starred opposite Aishwarya Rai in the period romance Umrao Jaan, a remake of the 1981 film of the same name. The film failed to earn the same level of appreciation as the original and was also a commercial failure. He was next seen in Dhoom 2 (2006), which featured him and Uday Chopra reprising their roles from the original Dhoom (2004) joined by new cast members Hrithik Roshan, Aishwarya Rai and Bipasha Basu. With earnings of ₹1.5 billion (US$16 million), Dhoom 2 became the highest grossing Indian film at that time, a distinction that was held for two years, though some critics commented that Bachchan was "reduced to a mere supporting player" to his co-star Roshan.

Bachchan earned critical acclaim for his performance in Mani Ratnam's Guru (2007), loosely based on the life of business magnate Dhirubhai Ambani." The film starred him alongside Aishwarya Rai (their first professional collaboration after their engagement), R. Madhavan, Mithun Chakraborty, Vidya Balan, and Arya Babbar. The film was a commercial success at the box office, and earned him his second nomination for the Filmfare Award for Best Actor. Guru was noted as the best Hindi film since Lagaan (2001) by the Los Angeles Weekly. His next release was the musical comedy Jhoom Barabar Jhoom (2007) alongside Preity Zinta, Bobby Deol, and Lara Dutta. The film was declared below average by Box Office India and was a moderate success overseas. He was then seen playing a minor role in the female-centric drama Laaga Chunari Mein Daag (2007) as the love interest of the film's lead actress Rani Mukerji. The film had poor critical and financial returns. In the 2007 melodrama Om Shanti Om, he made a cameo alongside several Bollywood stars and made brief appearances in Shootout at Lokhandwala and Aag.

Bachchan's first release of 2008 was Ram Gopal Varma's Sarkar Raj, which featured him and his father Amitabh Bachchan reprising their roles from Sarkar (2005) while his wife Aishwarya Rai Bachchan entered the cast as a new addition. This film proved to be successful at the box office and earned him his fifth nomination for the Filmfare Award for Best Supporting Actor. After making a guest appearance in Mission Istaanbul, Bachchan's next release was the fantasy adventure film Drona (2008), which emerged as a major critical and commercial disaster. He was next seen in Tarun Mansukhani's Dostana (2008), a romantic comedy about two men (Bachchan and John Abraham) who pretend to be gay in order to be allowed to live with a girl (Priyanka Chopra), but then find that they have both fallen in love with her. The film emerged as a critical and commercial success at the box-office with worldwide revenues of over ₹860 million (US$9 million) and earned him his third nomination for the Filmfare Award for Best Actor.

Bachchan's first release of 2009 was Delhi-6, which received a lukewarm response from critics despite underperforming at the box office. Later that year he was seen in the family dramedy Paa, which he also produced. The film's plot centered on a boy (Amitabh Bachchan) with progeria whose parents were played by Abhishek Bachchan and Vidya Balan. The movie was a "semi hit" at the box office, and for his work as a producer on the film, Bachchan earned the National Film Award for Best Feature Film in Hindi.

=== 2010–2017: Setback and ensemble films ===
In the early 2010s, Bachchan experienced a brief setback in his career. His first release of 2010 was Raavan (2010), in which he had the role of Beera (modeled on Ravana, the antagonist of Ramayana). The movie was a commercial failure. He then starred in Ashutosh Gowariker's period film Khelein Hum Jee Jaan Sey opposite Deepika Padukone. Based on the book Do and Die, the film is a retelling of the 1930 Chittagong armoury raid. Bachchan featured as the revolutionary leader Surya Sen and Padukone played Kalpana Dutta, his confidante. The movie received generally positive feedback from critics, but failed to deliver optimal results at the box office. In the same year, Bachchan made a voice cameo in Jhootha Hi Sahi. In 2011, he starred in two action thrillers: Game, in which he had the role of a casino owner in Turkey, and Dum Maaro Dum, which showed him in the role of a previously corrupt ACP. Neither of these fared well commercially, though Bachchan was praised for his performance in the latter.

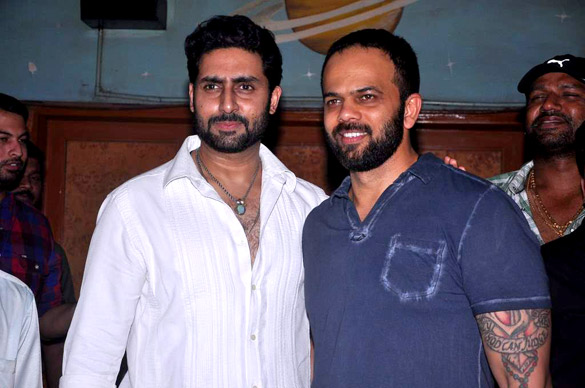
Bachchan with Rohit Shetty at the screening of Bol Bachchan in 2012

In 2012, Bachchan starred in the heist thriller Players, a remake of 2003's The Italian Job. Although journalists had high expectations, it failed commercially, was negatively compared to The Italian Job, and highly criticised for its execution and performances. Bachchan then played the lead role in Rohit Shetty's comedy Bol Bachchan, which was a success at the box-office despite receiving mixed reviews from critics. Film critic Anupama Chopra called Bachchan a "good part of the film" and also commented that he "manages to sparkle even in a script that is lazy and determinedly lowbrow". He received several awards for his role, including Best Comedian from both IIFA and Screen. In 2013, Bachchan starred in Dhoom 3, reprising his role from the previous two Dhoom films. In this instalment of the series, he and Uday Chopra were joined by Aamir Khan and Katrina Kaif. The film received ambivalent reviews, and some critics commented that Bachchan's performance was overshadowed by Khan's. Earning ₹5.42 billion (US$56 million) in box-office receipts, Dhoom 3 became the highest-grossing Bollywood film of all time until it was surpassed by PK in 2014.

Bachchan was next seen in Farah Khan's dance comedy Happy New Year, a musical heist film, playing the second lead to Shah Rukh Khan. The film featured an ensemble cast consisting of Bachchan, Khan, Deepika Padukone, Sonu Sood, Boman Irani, Vivaan Shah and Jackie Shroff. The film became a major commercial success grossing ₹3.8 billion (US$64.85 million) worldwide, and earned him his sixth nomination for the Filmfare Award for Best Supporting Actor. In the same year, he made a special appearance in the comedy The Shaukeens. Bachchan was then seen in the 2015 family comedy-drama All Is Well. The film received negative reviews and underperformed at the box office. His only release of 2016 was the comedy Housefull 3, the third instalment of the Housefull film series. The film was a commercial success at the box office.

=== 2018–present: Streaming ventures and critical recognition ===
In 2018, Bachchan starred in Anurag Kashyap's Manmarziyaan alongside Taapsee Pannu and Vicky Kaushal. He was praised for his nuanced performance and depth he brought to the character, though the movie was not a commercial success. In 2020, he featured in the black comedy crime film Ludo, which was released on Netflix. It received mostly positive reviews. In the same year, he began starring in the TV series Breathe: Into the Shadows, Alongside Amit Sadh and Nithya Menen which premiered on Amazon Prime Video. The series received negative feedback from critics on its storyline, though for his performance Bachchan was nominated for the Best Actor in a Drama Series award at the Filmfare OTT Awards.

Bachchan's next project, The Big Bull, directed by Kookie Gulati and produced by Ajay Devgn, Anand Pandit and Kumar Mangat, for which he started shooting in September 2019, streamed worldwide on 8 April 2021 on Disney+ Hotstar. The film received mixed reviews from critics, but praised Bachchan's performance. He was then seen in Red Chillies Entertainment production's Bob Biswas, released in December 2021 on Zee5. The film received mixed reviews from the critics. In February of the same year, he began shooting for the social comedy Dasvi, a film produced by Dinesh Vijan's Maddock Films and Jio Studios, alongside Yami Gautam. It was released in April 2022, and while the movie received mixed reviews Bachchan was praised for his performance. HeMale) for his performance at the 2022 Filmfare OTT Awards. In late 2021, Bachchan started shooting for the Hindi remake of R. Parthiban's Tamil film Oththa Seruppu Size 7, tentatively titled SSS-7 (Single Slipper Size – 7).

On 5 February 2022, Bachchan's 46th birthday, he started filming for R. Balki's sports drama Ghoomer, which was released on 18 August 2023. The film premiered at the 12th Indian Film Festival of Melbourne, following which the critical reception was largely positive, and his performance of a brash cricket coach received praise and even earned him a nomination for Best Actor (Critics) at 69th Filmfare Awards. In the same year, he made a cameo in the action thriller Bholaa. In 2024, Bachchan starred in the biographical drama film based on the life of cancer survivor Arjun Sen, I Want to Talk, directed by Shoojit Sircar. Bacchan received wide acclaim for his role. Sukanya Verma of Rediff.com wrote, "Bachchan conveys the numerous chapters and challenges of his mind, body and soul with a never-before candour". Shubhra Gupta of The Indian Express observed that "Bachchan lets go of vanity, revealing a thickened gut, and scars-on-the-belly, and an ability to bare. I Want to Talk earned him his first Filmfare Award for Best Actor.

Bachchan played a father fulfilling his daughter's (played by Inayat Verma) dream in Be Happy, his first film of 2025. Tamma Moksha of The Hindu stated, "Abhishek and Inayat are convincing in their respective roles and bring the father-daughter equation to life. Abhishek true to Shiv (initially at least) sucks out the energy of every scene he walks in to with his grumpy demeanor." He next played one of the primary character in Housefull 5 opposite Jacqueline Fernandez. The film was released in two versions, titled Housefull 5A and Housefull 5B, each featuring a different climax and murderer. Lachmi Deb Roy opined that he gave a stunning performance.

== Other work and media image ==
As the son of the actors Amitabh and Jaya, Bachchan faced the media spotlight from a young age. Discussing nepotism in Bollywood, Shama Rana views him as one of several actors who managed film careers with the help of family relations in the industry. Bachchan is noted for playing diverse roles in films, such as in — Yuva, Sarkar, Kabhi Alvida Naa Kehna, Bunty Aur Babli, Guru, Dus, Bol Bachchan and the Dhoom franchise. In the Rediff.com's list of best Bollywood actors, Bachchan was placed third in 2005, eighth in 2006 and tenth in 2007. Bachchan was also placed in Rediff.com's list of Top 10 Actors of 2000–2010. He was placed in Times of India's 50 Most Desirable Men list, for three consecutive years.

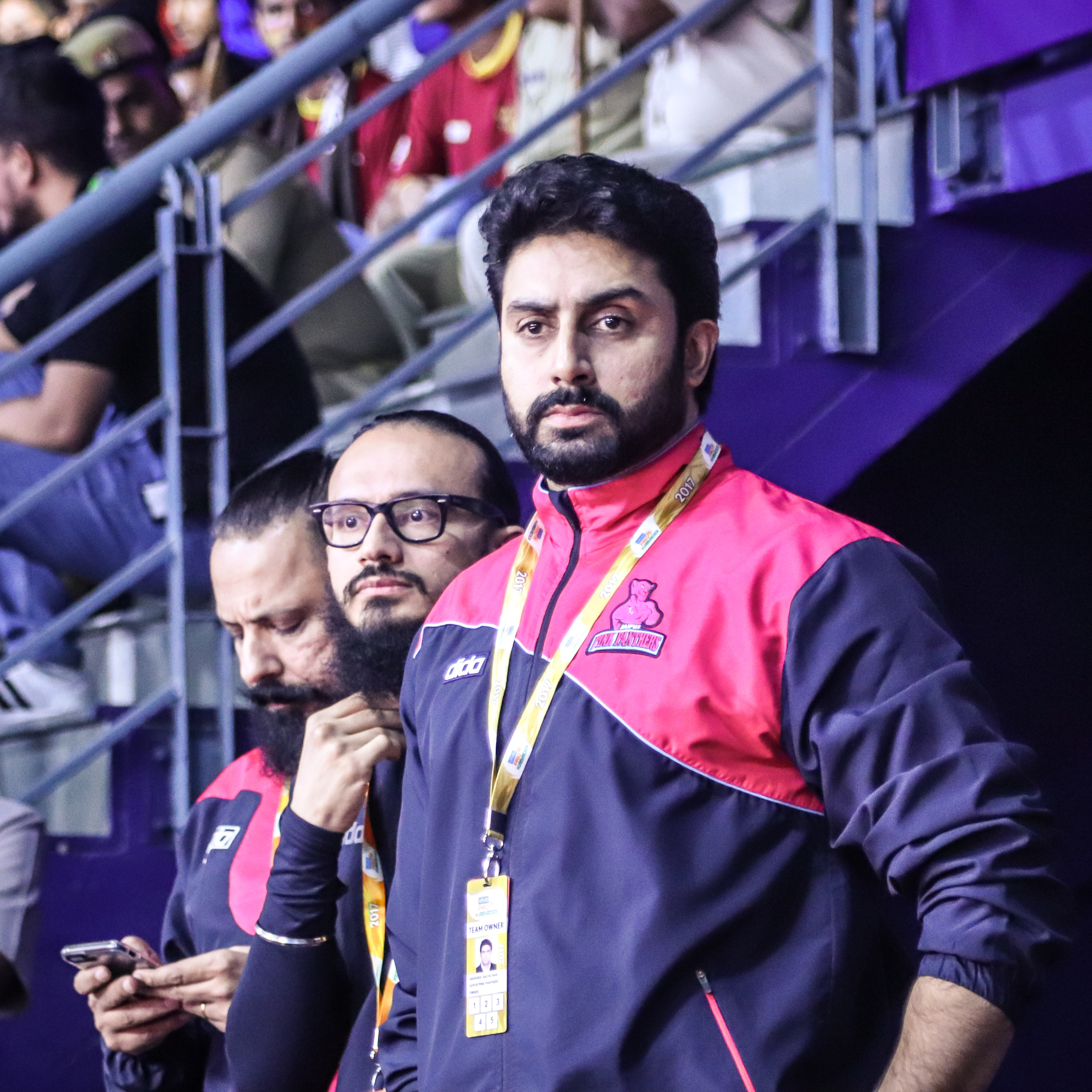
Bachchan at Jaipur Pink Panthers match in 2017

From 2012 to 2016, Bachchan was placed on Forbes India's Celebrity 100—a list based on the income and popularity of Indian celebrities. Bachchan has been a celebrity endorser and brand ambassador for products like LG Home appliances, American Express credit cards, Videocon DTH, Motorola mobiles, Ford Fiesta and Idea Cellular. Bachchan was announced the winner of the "Best Brand Ambassador of the Year" award at the NDTV Techlife Awards in 2009. AdEx India, a division of TAM Media Research conducted a study on celebrity brand endorsements for the period of Jan–Dec 2010 in which Abhishek Bachchan eats the pie with a 4.7% share ad volume out of the 41.5% film actors on the endorsement circuit. Bachchan became the brand ambassador for TTK Prestige, part of the TTK Group in October 2013 along with his wife Aishwarya Rai. In 2014, he became the brand ambassador for the END7 campaign of the Global Network for Neglected Tropical Diseases. The goal of the campaign is to eradicate seven different tropical diseases by 2020.

In 2005, Bachchan was a part of Tamil director Mani Ratnam's stage show, Netru Indru Naalai, an event which sought to raise funds for The Banyan, a voluntary organisation which rehabilitates homeless women with mental illness in Chennai. In the summer of 2008, Bachchan, his wife, his father, and actors Preity Zinta, Riteish Deshmukh, and Madhuri Dixit starred in the "Unforgettable World Tour" stage production. The first leg covered the US, Canada, Trinidad, and London. Bachchan is also involved in the functional and administrative operations of his father's company, originally known as ABCL, and renamed as AB Corp. Ltd. That company, along with Wizcraft International Entertainment Pvt. Ltd., developed the Unforgettable production. In 2011, Bachchan promoted awareness of drug abuse in India as part of a citizen education campaign. The actor launched the Awareness Day race, which celebrated the silver jubilee of the country's Narcotics Control Bureau. Bachchan bought the Pro Kabaddi League franchise team Jaipur Pink Panthers and co-purchased the Indian Super League football team Chennaiyin FC in 2014. Jaipur Pink Panthers won the first ever championships held in 2014. Chennaiyin won league titles in 2015 and 2018. His involvement in the kabaddi sport was documented in a 2020 television series, Sons of the Soil: Jaipur Pink Panthers.

== Personal life ==
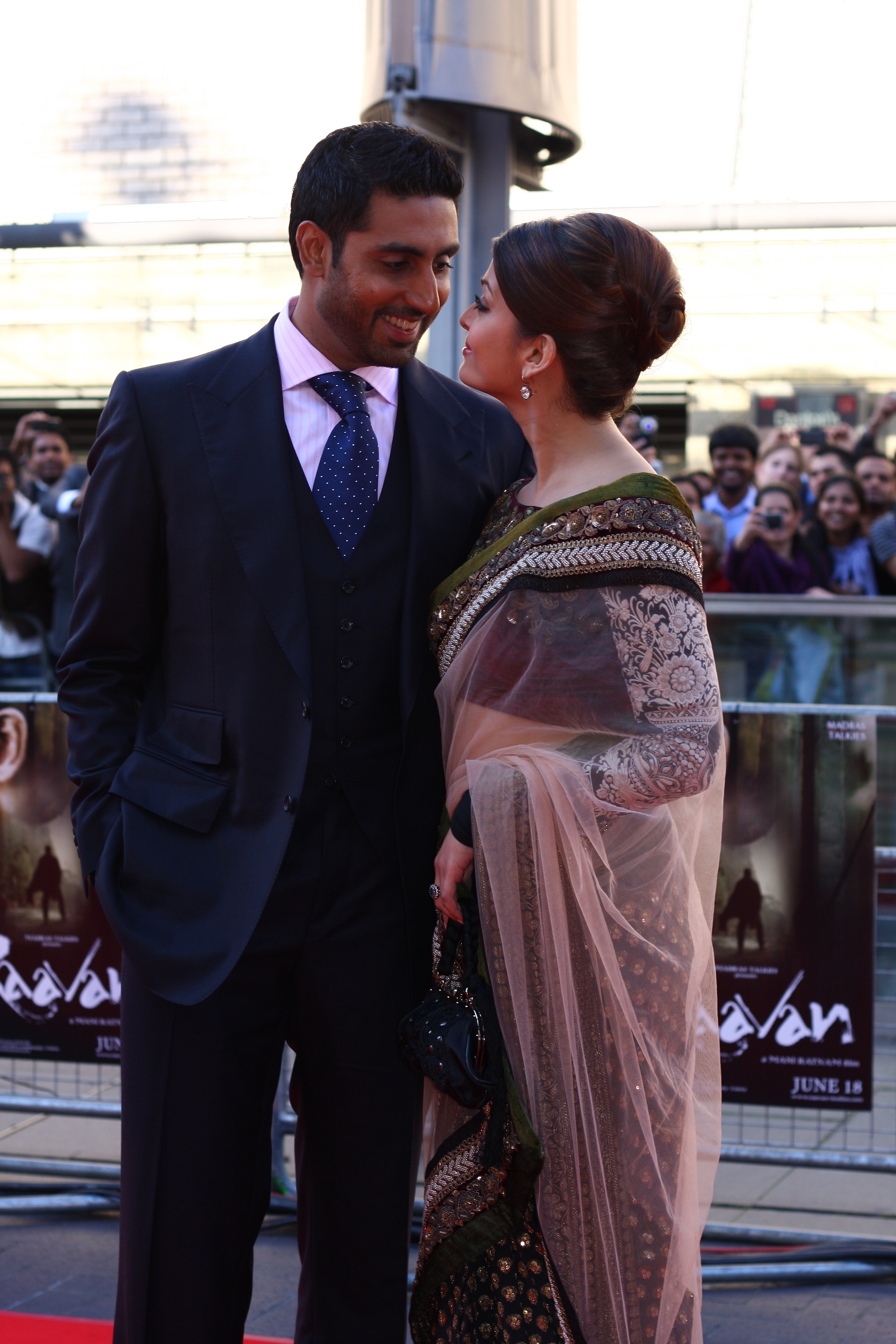
Bachchan with his wife Aishwarya Rai promoting Raavan at 2010 Cannes Film Festival

In October 2002, at his father Amitabh Bachchan's 60th birthday celebration, Abhishek and actress Karisma Kapoor announced their engagement. The engagement was called off in January 2003. Bachchan fell in love with Aishwarya Rai while filming for Dhoom 2, though both of them had already appeared together in Dhai Akshar Prem Ke (in which her then longtime boyfriend, Salman Khan, made a brief cameo) and Kuch Naa Kaho. Bachchan and Rai announced their engagement on 14 January 2007 which was later confirmed by his father, Amitabh Bachchan. The couple was married on 20 April 2007, according to traditional Hindu rituals of the Bunt community, to which Rai belongs. The wedding took place in a private ceremony at the Bachchan residence, Prateeksha, in Juhu, Mumbai, but was heavily covered by the entertainment media. The couple appeared on the American talkshow The Oprah Winfrey Show in September 2009, and were described as more famous than Brangelina. They have been described as a supercouple in the Indian media. Rai gave birth to a girl, Aaradhya, on 16 November 2011. Their daughter became quite popular by the name of "Beti B" which was named by the fans and the media, since the couple took over four months to name their daughter.

In 2023, Bachchan and his daughter brought a court case against several YouTube channels that they claimed published fake news about her life and health. The court ruled in their favour, ordering Google and YouTube to take the videos down. In September 2025, Bachchan secured temporary relief from the Delhi High Court after raising concerns about his name, image, and likeness being misused, especially through AI-generated content and unauthorized commercial use, with the court ordering social media platforms to take down any content of this kind they were hosting.

== Awards and nominations ==
For his roles in the films Yuva (2004), Sarkar (2005), and Kabhi Alvida Naa Kehna (2006), Bachchan won the Filmfare Award for Best Supporting Actor. He is the second and only actor after Dilip Kumar to win an acting award 3 consecutive times.
