= Mumbai Se Aaya Mera Dost =

- Directed by: Apoorva Lakhia
- Written by: Apoorva Lakhia
- Produced by: Vishal Nihalani
- Starring: Abhishek Bachchan; Lara Dutta; Chunky Pandey
- Narrated by: Amitabh Bachchan
- Cinematography: Gururaj R. Jois
- Edited by: Steven H. Bernard
- Music by: Anu Malik; Ranjit Barot
- Distributed by: Rubberband Films
- Release date: 22 August 2003
- Running time: 147 minutes
- Country: India
- Language: Hindi

Mumbai Se Aaya Mera Dost (lit. 'My friend from Mumbai has arrived') is a 2003 Indian Hindi-language drama film directed by Apoorva Lakhia in his directorial debut. The film stars Abhishek Bachchan, Lara Dutta and Chunky Pandey. The film touched on the subject of the influence of television on village life.

== Synopsis ==
Dinanath Singh is honoured by the Indian Government in a ceremony televised live. While receiving the honour, Dinanath informs the government that his village still lacks electricity, and he is promised that electricity will be provided immediately. Soon afterwards, the village is electrified. Dinanath's grandson, Karan "Kanji", who is in Mumbai, hears the news and returns to the village with a C-Band ten-foot satellite dish and a Super Flat Stereo television. Once the satellite is installed, the villagers are thrilled by the television programmes. This gives rise to a running gag in which television culture is copied in rural life.

The changes lead the village priest to complain to Chotey Thakur Rudra Pratap Singh that the villagers are turning away from the temple and worship. Rudra is unconcerned, as he himself owns a television set. However, when the priest informs Rudra that his sister, Kesar Pratap Singh, also known as Kesi, and Kanji are in love, Rudra threatens to destroy Kanji and the entire village in the presence of a television crew filming the drama and broadcasting it live worldwide.

The plot culminates with Rudra, enraged by Kanji's antics, arriving to destroy the village. The villagers stand up against exploitation and fight Rudra and his goons.

== Cast ==
- Abhishek Bachchan as Karan "Kanji" Singh
- Lara Dutta as Kesar "Kesi" Pratap Singh
- Chunky Pandey as Sanjay "Sanju" Singh
- Aditya Lakhia as Surya
- Yashpal Sharma as Chotey Thakur Rudra Pratap Singh
- Rajendra Gupta as Sameer Goswami
- Daya Shankar Pandey as Hari Malhotra
- Akhilendra Mishra as Priest
- Raageshwari as Reporter Priya
- Shubro Bhattacharya as Abdul

== Soundtracks ==
The music was composed by Anu Malik. All lyrics were written by Sameer.

#	Title	Singer(s)	Length
1	"Koi Bheega Hai Rang Se" (Holi Re)	Zubeen Garg, Sonu Nigam, Alka Yagnik	06:26
2	"Shaher Ka Jadoo Re"	Sonu Nigam, Alka Yagnik	06:20
3	"Jeetenge Baazi Hum"	Sonu Nigam, Mahalakshmi Iyer	05:20
4	"Saiiyan"	Sunidhi Chauhan	05:25
5	"Mujhe Tune Jo Dekha"	Sonu Nigam, Alka Yagnik	06:24
6	"The Journey"	Instrumental	02:20

== Reception ==
Taran Adarsh of IndiaFM gave the film 1.5 out of 5, writing, "On the whole, MUMBAI SE AAYA MERA DOST has its moments of glory, but they're far too less to generate a lasting impact. Ordinary." R Verma of Rediff.com gave a negative review, criticising the film's "costumes, storyline, logic and characterisation." Also writing for Rediff.com, Sudipta Chakravarti wrote, "Instead of focusing on the power struggle, Mumbai Se Aaya Mera Dost runs into several other tracks that look completely out of place and derail the film", and called it "an ordinary movie that fails to create a lasting impact."
