= List of songs recorded by Vishal Dadlani =

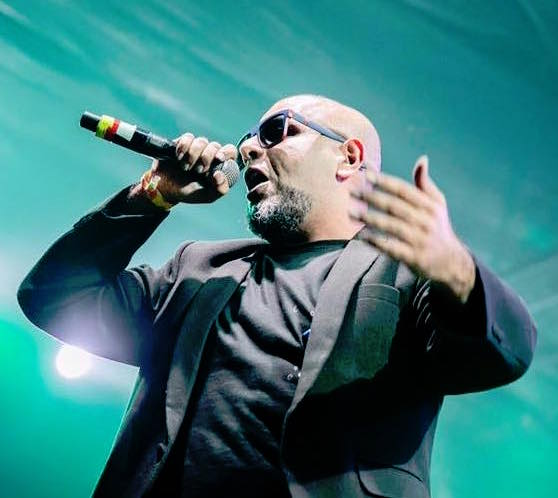
- Daldani in New Delhi, 2015
- Category: Songs
Hindi Film Songs	192
Telugu Film Songs	11
Tamil Film Songs	9
Kannada Film Songs	7
Malayalam Film Songs	14
Total	284

This is a list of songs recorded by Indian male playback singer Vishal Dadlani.

== Hindi songs ==
=== 1999 ===
Film	Song	Composer(s)	Writer(s)	Co-singer(s)	Ref.
Pyaar Mein Kabhi Kabhi	"Hum Naujawan Hain"	Vishal-Shiraz-Samrat	Vishal Dadlani, Raj Kaushal	Manohar, Suraj Jagan	

=== 2003 ===
Film	Song	Composer(s)	Writer(s)	Co-singer(s)	Ref.
Supari	"Tere Ishq Mein"	Vishal–Shekhar	Vishal Dadlani	Mahalakshmi Iyer	
Supari	"Chand Chahiye"	Vishal–Shekhar	Vishal Dadlani	Sunidhi Chauhan	
Jhankaar Beats	"Boss Kaun Hai"	Vishal–Shekhar	Vishal Dadlani	Amit Kumar, Shekhar Ravjiani	
Jhankaar Beats	"Jo Gaya Woh Gaya"	Vishal–Shekhar	Vishal Dadlani	KK	
Jhankaar Beats	"Ruk Ruk"	Vishal–Shekhar	Vishal Dadlani	Amit Kumar	

=== 2004 ===
Film	Song	Composer(s)	Writer(s)	Co-singer(s)	Ref.
Krishna Cottage	"Hamesha"	Vishal–Shekhar	Shekhar Ravjiani		
Popcorn Khao! Mast Ho Jao	"Popcorn Khao! Mast Ho Jao"	Vishal–Shekhar	Vishal Dadlani		

=== 2005 ===
Film	Song	Composer(s)	Writer(s)	Co-singer(s)	Ref.
Shabd	"Sholon Si"	Vishal–Shekhar	Irshad Kamil	Sunidhi Chauhan	
Shabd	"Sholon Si" (Remix Version)	Vishal–Shekhar	Irshad Kamil	Sunidhi Chauhan	
Karam	"Le Jaa"	Vishal–Shekhar	Vishal Dadlani	Harshdeep Kaur	
Home Delivery	"Gyan Guru"	Vishal–Shekhar	Vishal Dadlani		
Ek Ajnabee	"Ek Ajnabi (Mama Told Me)"	Vishal–Shekhar	Vishal Dadlani	Sunidhi Chauhan, Sukhwinder Singh	

=== 2006 ===
Film	Song	Composer(s)	Writer(s)	Co-singer(s)	Ref.
Taxi No. 9211	"Boombai Nagariya"	Vishal–Shekhar	Vishal Dadlani	Bappi Lahiri	
Taxi No. 9211	"Boombai Nagariya" (Club Mix Version)	Vishal–Shekhar	Vishal Dadlani	Bappi Lahiri	
Golmaal: Fun Unlimited	"Golmaal"	Vishal–Shekhar	Kumaar	Anushka Manchanda	
Golmaal: Fun Unlimited	"Golmaal" (Remix Version 1)	Vishal–Shekhar	Kumaar	Anushka Manchanda	
Golmaal: Fun Unlimited	"Golmaal" (Remix Version 2)	Vishal–Shekhar	Kumaar	Anushka Manchanda	
Golmaal: Fun Unlimited	"Mast Malang"	Vishal–Shekhar	Kumaar	Kunal Ganjawala	
Golmaal: Fun Unlimited	"Mast Malang" (Remix Version)	Vishal–Shekhar	Kumaar	Kunal Ganjawala	
Golmaal: Fun Unlimited	"Golmaal O O"	Vishal–Shekhar	Kumaar	Shaan, KK	
Golmaal: Fun Unlimited	"Golmaal O O (Remix)"	Vishal–Shekhar	Kumaar	Shaan, KK	
Dhoom 2	"Dhoom Again"	Pritam	Asif Ali Beg	Dominique Cerejo	
Baabul	"Come On"	Aadesh Shrivastava	Sameer	Amitabh Bachchan, Sonu Nigam, Aadesh Shrivastava, Ranjit Barot	
Baabul	"Come On" (Remix Version)	Aadesh Shrivastava	Sameer	Amitabh Bachchan, Sonu Nigam, Aadesh Shrivastava, Ranjit Barot	
Ek Ajnabee	"Ek Ajnabee (Mama Told Me)"	Vishal–Shekhar	Vishal Dadlani	Sunidhi Chauhan, Sukhwinder Singh	
I See You	"Halo Halo"	Vishal–Shekhar	Vishal Dadlani	Sunidhi Chauhan, Sukhwinder Singh	
I See You	"Halo Halo" (Remix Version)	Vishal–Shekhar	Vishal Dadlani	Sunidhi Chauhan, Sukhwinder Singh	
I See You	"Subah Subah"	Vishal–Shekhar	Vishal Dadlani	Zubeen Garg, Shekhar Ravjiani	
I See You	"Subah Subah" (Remix Version)	Vishal–Shekhar	Vishal Dadlani	Zubeen Garg, Shekhar Ravjiani	

=== 2007 ===
Film	Song	Composer(s)	Writer(s)	Co-singer(s)	Ref.
Honeymoon Travels Pvt. Ltd.	"Albela Albela"	Vishal–Shekhar	Javed Akhtar	Shankar Mahadevan	
Honeymoon Travels Pvt. Ltd.	"Haath Dhore Niye Chalo"	Vishal–Shekhar	Javed Akhtar	Shankar Mahadevan	
Ta Ra Rum Pum	"Ab To Forever"	Vishal–Shekhar	Javed Akhtar	KK, Shreya Ghoshal	
Ta Ra Rum Pum	"Saaiyaan"	Vishal–Shekhar	Javed Akhtar		
Jhoom Barabar Jhoom	"Kiss Of Love"	Shankar–Ehsaan–Loy	Gulzar	Vasundhara Das	
Cash	"Cash"	Vishal–Shekhar	Vishal Dadlani	Shekhar Ravjiani, Sunidhi Chauhan	
Cash	"Naa Puchho"	Vishal–Shekhar	Vishal Dadlani	Sunidhi Chauhan	
Cash	"Rehem Kare"	Vishal–Shekhar	Vishal Dadlani	Sunidhi Chauhan	
Cash	"Naughty Naughty"	Vishal–Shekhar	Vishal Dadlani	Anushka Manchanda	
Cash	"Zara Bachke Jee"	Vishal–Shekhar	Vishal Dadlani	Shekhar Ravjiani, Anushka Manchanda	
Taare Zameen Par	"Jame Raho"	Shankar–Ehsaan–Loy	Prasoon Joshi		

=== 2008 ===
Film	Song	Composer(s)	Writer(s)	Co-singer(s)	Ref.
Krazzy 4	"Break Free"	Rajesh Roshan	Asif Ali Beg		
Krazzy 4	"Break Free" (Remix Version)	Rajesh Roshan	Asif Ali Beg		
Krazzy 4	"Krazzy 4"	Rajesh Roshan	Asif Ali Beg		
Krazzy 4	"Krazzy 4" (Remix Version)	Rajesh Roshan	Asif Ali Beg		
Tashan	"Tashan Main"	Vishal–Shekhar	Piyush Mishra, Vishal Dadlani	Master Saleem	
Bachna Ae Haseeno	"Bachna Ae Haseeno"	Vishal–Shekhar	Anvita Dutt Guptan	Kishore Kumar, Sumit Kumar	
Dostana	"Jaane Kyun"	Vishal–Shekhar	Anvita Dutt Guptan		
Dostana	"Khabar Nahi"	Vishal–Shekhar	Anvita Dutt Guptan	Shreya Ghoshal, Amanat Ali	
Dostana	"Shut Up & Bounce"	Vishal–Shekhar	Anvita Dutt Guptan	Sunidhi Chauhan	
Dostana	"Desi Girl"	Vishal–Shekhar	Kumaar	Shankar Mahadevan, Sunidhi Chauhan	

=== 2009 ===
Film	Song	Composer(s)	Writer(s)	Co-singer(s)	Ref.
8 x 10 Tasveer	"Nazaara Hai"	Salim–Sulaiman	Irfan Siddiqui		
8 x 10 Tasveer	"Nazaara Hai" (Remix Version)	Salim–Sulaiman	Irfan Siddiqui		
Kaminey	"Dhan Te Nan"	Vishal Bhardwaj	Gulzar	Sukhwinder Singh	
Kaminey	"Dhan Te Nan" (Remix Version)	Vishal Bhardwaj	Gulzar	Sukhwinder Singh	
London Dreams	"Barson Yaaron"	Shankar–Ehsaan–Loy	Prasoon Joshi	Roop Kumar Rathod	
Aladin	"Bachke O Bachke"	Vishal–Shekhar	Anvita Dutt Guptan	Shankar Mahadevan, Shaan, Sunidhi Chauhan	
Aladin	"You May Be"	Vishal–Shekhar	VIshal Dadlani	Shekhar Ravjiani	
Kurbaan	"Kurbaan Hua"	Salim-Sulaiman	Niranjan Iyengar		
Rocket Singh: Salesman of the Year	"Gadbadi Hadbadi"	Salim-Sulaiman	Jaideep Sahni		

=== 2010 ===
Film	Song	Composer(s)	Writer(s)	Co-singer(s)	Ref.
Pyaar Impossible!	"Pyaar Impossible"	Salim–Sulaiman	Anvita Dutt Guptan	Dominique Cerejo	
Pyaar Impossible!	"Pyaar Impossible" (Remix Version)	Salim–Sulaiman	Anvita Dutt Guptan	Dominique Cerejo	
Chance Pe Dance	"Pump It Up"	Adnan Sami	Irfan Siddiqui		
Chance Pe Dance	"Pump It Up" (Remix Version)	Adnan Sami	Irfan Siddiqui		
Hum Tum Aur Ghost	"Hum Tum Aur Ghost"	Shankar–Ehsaan–Loy	Javed Akhtar	Shankar Mahadevan	
Hum Tum Aur Ghost	"Hum Tum Aur Ghost" (Remix Version)	Shankar–Ehsaan–Loy	Javed Akhtar	Shankar Mahadevan	
Prem Kaa Game	"Zabardast"	Raju Singh	Kiran Kotrial	Sonu Nigam, Sunidhi Chauhan	
Paathshaala	"Paathshaala (Khushnuma)"	Hanif Shaikh	Hanif Shaikh		
It's a Wonderful Afterlife	"Hai Marjawaan"	Ankur Tewari, Mikey McCleary	Ankur Tewari		
Kites	"Fire"	Rajesh Roshan	Asif Ali Beg	Rajesh Roshan, Anirudh Bhola, Anushka Manchanda	
Kites	"Fire" (English Version)	Rajesh Roshan	Asif Ali Beg	Rajesh Roshan, Anirudh Bhola, Anushka Manchanda	
Kites	"Tum Bhi Ho Wahi"	Rajesh Roshan	Asif Ali Beg	Suraj Jagan	
Kites	"Tum Bhi Ho Wahi" (Remix Version)	Rajesh Roshan	Asif Ali Beg	Suraj Jagan	
I Hate Luv Storys	"I Hate Luv Storys"	Vishal–Shekhar	Vishal Dadlani		
I Hate Luv Storys	"Jab Mila Tu"	Vishal–Shekhar	Anvita Dutt Guptan		
We Are Family	"Reham O Karam"	Shankar–Ehsaan–Loy	Irshad Kamil	Shankar Mahadevan	
Anjaana Anjaani	"Anjaana Anjaani"	Vishal - Shekhar	Irshad Kamil	Shilpa Rao	
Anjaana Anjaani	"I Feel Good"	Vishal - Shekhar	Vishal Dadlani	Shilpa Rao	
Do Dooni Chaar	"Do Dooni Chaar"	Meet Bros Anjjan	Manoj Muntashir	Shankar Mahadevan	
Do Dooni Chaar	"Do Dooni Chaar" (Jam Version)	Meet Bros Anjjan	Manoj Muntashir	Shankar Mahadevan	
Do Dooni Chaar	"Do Dooni Chaar" (Club Mix Version)	Meet Bros Anjjan	Manoj Muntashir	Shankar Mahadevan	
Knock Out	"Knock Out"	Gourav Dasgupta	Vishal Dadlani		
Break Ke Baad	"Adhoore"	Vishal–Shekhar	Prasoon Joshi	Alyssa Mendonsa	
Break Ke Baad	"Adhoore" (Remix Version)	Vishal–Shekhar	Prasoon Joshi	Alyssa Mendonsa	
Break Ke Baad	"Dooriyan Hain Zaroori"	Vishal–Shekhar	Prasoon Joshi	Monica Dogra	
Break Ke Baad	"Don't Worry About Me"	Vishal–Shekhar	Vishal Dadlani		
Tees Maar Khan	"Sheila Ki Jawani"	Vishal–Shekhar	Vishal Dadlani	Sunidhi Chauhan	
Tees Maar Khan	"Sheila Ki Jawani" (Remix Version)	Vishal–Shekhar	Vishal Dadlani	Sunidhi Chauhan	

=== 2011 ===
Film	Song	Composer(s)	Writer(s)	Co-singer(s)	Ref.
No One Killed Jessica	"Aitbaar"	Amit Trivedi	Amitabh Bhattacharya	Mame Khan, Robert Bob Omulo	
Patiala House	"Aadat Hai Voh"	Shankar–Ehsaan–Loy	Anvita Dutt Guptan		
Game	"It's A Game"	Shankar–Ehsaan–Loy	Javed Akhtar		
Stanley Ka Dabba	"Tere Andar Bhi Kahin"	Hitesh Sonik	Amole Gupte		
Pyaar Ka Punchnama	"Life Sahi Hai"	Clinton Cerejo	Luv Ranjan	Benny Dayal, Sidd Coutto, KK	
Bbuddah... Hoga Terra Baap	"Bbuddah Hoga Terra Baap" (Dub Step)	Vishal–Shekhar	Vishal Dadlani	Amitabh Bachchan	
Zindagi Na Milegi Dobara	"Ik Junoon (Paint It Red)"	Shankar–Ehsaan–Loy	Javed Akhtar	Shankar Mahadevan, Ehsaan Noorani, Alyssa Mendonsa, Gulraj Singh	
Zindagi Na Milegi Dobara	"Ik Junoon" (Remix Version)	Shankar–Ehsaan–Loy	Javed Akhtar	Shankar Mahadevan, Ehsaan Noorani, Alyssa Mendonsa, Gulraj Singh	
Rascals	"Tik Tuk"	Vishal–Shekhar	Irshad Kamil	Daler Mehndi, Monali Thakur	
Mujhse Fraaandship Karoge	"Dheaon Dheaon"	Raghu Dixit	Anvita Dutt Guptan	Aditi Singh Sharma	
Mujhse Fraaandship Karoge	"Dheaon Dheaon" (The Seeti Seeti Bang Bang Mix)	Raghu Dixit	Anvita Dutt Guptan	Aditi Singh Sharma	
Ra.One	"Criminal"	Vishal–Shekhar	Kumaar	Akon, Shruti Pathak	
Ra.One	"Criminal" (Remix Version)	Vishal–Shekhar	Kumaar	Akon, Shruti Pathak	
Ra.One	"Jiya Mora Ghabraaye (The Chase)"	Vishal–Shekhar	Anubhav Sinha	Sukhwinder Singh	
Ra.One	"Dildaara (Stand by me)"	Vishal–Shekhar	Kumaar and Vishal Dadlani	Shafqat Amanat Ali, Shekhar Ravjiani, Clinton Cerejo	
Ra.One	"Raftaarein"	Vishal–Shekhar	Vishal Dadlani	Shekhar Ravjiani, Jolly Mukherjee	
Ladies vs Ricky Bahl	"Thug Le"	Salim–Sulaiman	Amitabh Bhattacharya	Shweta Pandit	
Don 2	"Zara Dil Ko Thaam Lo"	Shankar–Ehsaan–Loy	Javed Akhtar	Anusha Mani	

=== 2012 ===
Film	Song	Composer(s)	Writer(s)	Co-singer(s)	Ref.
Ek Main Aur Ekk Tu	"Kar Chalna Shuru Tu"	Amit Trivedi	Amitabh Bhattacharya	Shilpa Rao	
3 (dubbed)	"Ro Ne Do" (Remix - The Scream Of Love)	Anirudh Ravichander	Dhanush		
Ishaqzaade	"Chhokra Jawaan"	Amit Trivedi	Habib Faisal	Sunidhi Chauhan	
Vicky Donor	"Mar Jayian" (Romantic Version)	Donn - Bann	Swanand Kirkire	Sunidhi Chauhan	
Arjun: The Warrior Prince	"Daanav"	Vishal–Shekhar	Anvita Dutt Guptan	Shankar Mahadevan	
Shanghai	"Bharat Mata Ki Jai"	Vishal–Shekhar	Dibakar Banerjee	Keerthi Sagathia, Mandar Apte, Chintamani Sohoni, R N Iyer, Bhupesh	
Shanghai	"Bharat Mata Ki Jai" (Remix Version)	Vishal–Shekhar	Dibakar Banerjee	DJ Kiran, Keerti Sagathia	
Shanghai	"Imported Kamariya"	Vishal–Shekhar	Vishal Dadlani, Anvita Dutt	Richa Sharma, Vishal Dadlani, Shekhar Ravjiani	
Kyaa Super Kool Hain Hum	"Dil Garden Garden Ho Gaya"	Sachin–Jigar	Mayur Puri		
Kyaa Super Kool Hain Hum	"Dil Garden Garden Ho Gaya" (Remix Version)	Sachin–Jigar	Mayur Puri		
Talaash: The Answer Lies Within	"Jee Le Zaraa"	Ram Sampath	Javed Akhtar		
Talaash: The Answer Lies Within	"Jee Le Zaraa" (Remix Version)	Ram Sampath	Javed Akhtar		
Student of the Year	"Radha"	Vishal–Shekhar	Anvita Dutt Guptan	Shreya Ghoshal, Shekhar Ravjiani, Udit Narayan	
Student of the Year	"Ratta Maar"	Vishal–Shekhar	Anvita Dutt Guptan	Shefali Alvares	

=== 2013 ===
Film	Song	Composer(s)	Writer(s)	Co-singer(s)	Ref.
Race 2	"Allah Duhai Hai"	Pritam	Mayur Puri	Atif Aslam, Anushka Manchanda, Ritu Pathak, Michie One	
Race 2	"Allah Duhai Hai" (Remix Version)	Pritam	Mayur Puri	Atif Aslam, Anushka Manchanda, Ritu Pathak, Michie One	
ABCD: Any Body Can Dance	"Shambhu Sutaya"	Sachin–Jigar	Mayur Puri	Shankar Mahadevan	
Akaash Vani	"Crazy Lover"	Hitesh Sonik	Luv Ranjan	Sunidhi Chauhan	
Yeh Jawaani Hai Deewani	"Balam Pichkari"	Pritam	Amitabh Bhattacharya	Shalmali Kholgade	
Yeh Jawaani Hai Deewani	"Ghagra"	Pritam	Amitabh Bhattacharya	Rekha Bhardwaj	
Gippi	"Pehn Di Takki"	Vishal–Shekhar	Vishal Dadlani		
Gippi	"We Are Like This Only"	Vishal–Shekhar	Vishal Dadlani	Hard Kaur	
Chennai Express	"One Two Three Four (Get On The Dance Floor)"	Vishal–Shekhar	Amitabh Bhattacharya	Hamsika Iyer	
Chennai Express	"Ready Steady Po"	Vishal–Shekhar	Amitabh Bhattacharya, Brodha V, Smokey, Enkore	Brodha V, Smokey, Enkore, Natalie Di Luccio	
Boss	"Hum Na Tode"	P. A. Deepak	Kumaar		
Gori Tere Pyaar Mein	"Tooh"	Vishal–Shekhar	Anvita Dutt Guptan	Mika Singh, Mamta Sharma, Shruti Pathak	

=== 2014 ===
Film	Song	Composer(s)	Writer(s)	Co-singer(s)	Ref.
Yaariyan	"Zor Lagaake Haishaa"	Arko Pravo Mukherjee	Irshad Kamil		
Hasee Toh Phasee	"Drama Queen"	Vishal–Shekhar	Amitabh Bhattacharya	Shreya Ghoshal	
Hasee Toh Phasee	"Drama Queen" (Remix Version)	Vishal–Shekhar	Amitabh Bhattacharya	Shreya Ghoshal	
Gunday	"Tune Maari Entriyaan"	Sohail Sen	Irshad Kamil	KK, Neeti Mohan, Bappi Lahiri	
Dishkiyaoon	"Nissar"	Sneha Khanwalkar	Sanamjit Talwar	Sneha Khanwalkar	
Bewakoofiyaan	"Aye Jigida"	Raghu Dixit	Anvita Dutt Guptan		
Humpty Sharma Ki Dulhania	"D Se Dance"	Sachin–Jigar	Irshad Kamil	Shalmali Kholgade, Anushka Manchanda	
Mary Kom	"Ziddi Dil"	Shashi Suman	Prashant Ingole		
Mary Kom	"Salaam India"	Shivam	Sandeep Singh	Salim Merchant	
Bang Bang!	"Tu Meri"	Vishal–Shekhar	Vishal Dadlani		
Bang Bang!	"Tu Meri" (Remix Version)	Vishal–Shekhar	Vishal Dadlani		
Haider	"Aao Na"	Vishal Bhardwaj	Gulzar		
Sonali Cable	"Gannu Rocks"	Mikey McCleary	Kausar Munir	Anmol Malik	
Happy New Year	"India Waale"	Vishal–Shekhar	Irshad Kamil	KK, Shankar Mahadevan, Neeti Mohan	
Happy New Year	"India Waale" (Electronic Version)	Vishal–Shekhar	Irshad Kamil	KK, Shankar Mahadevan, Neeti Mohan	
Happy New Year	"World Dance Medley"	Vishal–Shekhar	Irshad Kamil	Neeti Mohan, Sukhwinder Singh, KK, Shankar Mahadevan, Shah Rukh Khan	
Happy New Year	"Sharabi"	Vishal–Shekhar	Kumaar, Vishal Dadlani, Shekhar Ravjiani	Manj Musik, Nindy Kaur, Shekhar Ravjiani	
Happy New Year	"Dance Like A Chammiya"	Vishal–Shekhar	Vishal Dadlani	Sunidhi Chauhan	
Ungli	"Dance Basanti"	Sachin–Jigar	Amitabh Bhattacharya	Anushka Manchanda	
Ungli	"Aadarniya Ungli"	Gulraj Singh	Manoj Yadav	Neeti Mohan	

=== 2015 ===
Film	Song	Composer(s)	Writer(s)	Co-singer(s)	Ref.
Badlapur	"Badla Badla"	Sachin–Jigar	Priya Saraiya, Dinesh Vijan	Jasleen Royal, Suraj Jagan	
ABCD 2	"Bezubaan Phir Se"	Sachin–Jigar	Mayur Puri	Anushka Manchanda, Madhav Krishna	
Bajrangi Bhaijaan	"Selfie Le Le Re"	Pritam	Mayur Puri	Badshah, Nakash Aziz	
Brothers	"Brothers Anthem"	Ajay–Atul	Amitabh Bhattacharya		
Shaandaar	"Gulaabo"	Amit Trivedi	Anvita Dutt Guptan	Anusha Mani	
All Izz Well	"Chaar Shanivaar"	Amaal Malik	Prashant Ingole	Badshah	
Bajirao Mastani	"Malhari"	Sanjay Leela Bhansali	Prashant Ingole		

=== 2016 ===
Film	Song	Composer(s)	Writer(s)	Co-singer(s)	Ref.
Sultan	"Baby Ko Bass Pasand Hai"	Vishal–Shekhar	Irshad Kamil	Shalmali Kholgade, Neeti Mohan, Badshah	
Sultan	"Tuk Tuk"	Vishal–Shekhar	Irshad Kamil	Nooran Sisters	
A Flying Jatt	"Bhangda Pa"	Sachin–Jigar	Mayur Puri	Divya Kumar, Asees Kaur	
Akira	"Rajj Rajj Ke"	Vishal–Shekhar	Amitabh Bhattacharya	Sonakshi Sinha	
Akira	"Rajj Rajj Ke (Version 2)"	Vishal–Shekhar	Amitabh Bhattacharya	Nahid Afrin	
Akira	"Rajj Rajj Ke" (Remix)	Vishal–Shekhar	Amitabh Bhattacharya	Nahid Afrin	
Banjo	"Bappa"	Vishal–Shekhar	Amitabh Bhattacharya		
Banjo	"Rada"	Vishal–Shekhar	Amitabh Bhattacharya	Nakash Aziz, Shalmali Kholgade	
Banjo	"Pee Paa Ke"	Vishal–Shekhar	Amitabh Bhattacharya	Nakash Aziz	
Banjo	"Om Ganapataye Namaha Deva"	Vishal–Shekhar	Amitabh Bhattacharya	Nakash Aziz	
Banjo	"Banjo Party Song"	Vishal–Shekhar	Amitabh Bhattacharya		
Befikre	"Je T'aime"	Vishal–Shekhar	Jaideep Sahni	Sunidhi Chauhan	
Befikre	"Khulke Dhulke"	Vishal–Shekhar	Jaideep Sahni	Gippy Grewal, Harshdeep Kaur, Ankur Tiwari, Kunal Ganjawala	

=== 2017 ===
Film	Song	Composer(s)	Writer(s)	Co-singer(s)	Ref.
Kaabil	"Mon Amour"	Rajesh Roshan	Manoj Muntashir		
Mubarakan	"Jatt Jaguar"	Amaal Mallik	Kumaar	Navraj Hans, Apeksha Dandekar	
A Gentleman	"Chandralekha"	Sachin–Jigar	Vayu	Jonita Gandhi	
Chef	"Banjara"	Raghu Dixit	Ankur Tewari		
Tiger Zinda Hai	Swag Se Swagat	Vishal–Shekhar	Irshad Kamil	Neha Bhasin	

=== 2018 ===
Film	Song	Composer(s)	Writer(s)	Co-singer(s)	Ref.
Kaalakaandi	Aa Bhi Jaa"	Sameer Uddin	Anvita Dutt	Abhishek Nailwal	
Gold	"Chad Gayi Hai"	Sachin–Jigar	Vayu		
Thugs of Hindostan	"Vashmalle"	Ajay–Atul	Amitabh Bhattacharya	Sukhwinder Singh	
Thugs of Hindostan	"Suraiya"	Ajay–Atul	Amitabh Bhattacharya	Shreya Ghoshal	
Namaste England	"Bhare Bazaar"	Badshah, Rishi Rich	Master Rakesh, Rap lyrics: Badshah	Payal Dev, Badshah, B Praak	
Mulk	"Khudara"	Prasad Sashte	Shakeel Azmi		
Phamous	"Bandook"	Krsna Solo	Puneet Sharma		

=== 2019 ===
Film	Song	Composer(s)	Writer(s)	Co-singer(s)	Ref.
Student of the Year 2	"The Jawaani Song"	Vishal–Shekhar	Anvita Dutt Guptan, Original by: Anand Bakshi	Payal Dev	
Student of the Year 2	"Jatt Ludhiyane Da"	Vishal–Shekhar	Anvita Dutt Guptan	Payal Dev	
Bharat	"Zinda"	Vishal–Shekhar	Ali Abbas Zafar		
Malaal	"Aila Re"	Sanjay Leela Bhansali	Prashant Ingole		
Ek Ladki Ko Dekha Toh Aisa Laga	"Good Morning"	Rochak Kohli	Gurpreet Saini	Shannon Donald	
Super 30	"Paisa"	Ajay–Atul	Amitabh Bhattacharya		
War	"Jai Jai Shiv Shankar"	Vishal–Shekhar	Kumaar	Benny Dayal	
Saand Ki Aankh	"Womaniya"	Vishal Mishra	Raj Shekhar	Vishal Mishra	
Housefull 4	"Shaitan Ka Saala"	Sohail Sen	Farhad Samji	Sohail Sen	
Made In China	"The Naari Naari Song"	Sachin–Jigar	Vayu	Jonita Gandhi, Sachin–Jigar	

=== 2020 ===
Film	Song	Composer(s)	Writer(s)	Co-singer(s)	Note
Angrezi Medium	"Kudi Nu Nachne De"	Sachin–Jigar	Priya Saraiya	Sachin–Jigar	
Baaghi 3	"Dus Bahane 2.0"	Vishal–Shekhar	Panchhi Jalonvi	Shekhar Ravjiani, KK, Shaan, Tulsi Kumar	Recreated version of the song from Dus
Khuda Haafiz	"Khuda Haafiz - Title Track"	Mithoon	Sayeed Quadri		

=== 2021 ===
Film	Song	Composer(s)	Writer(s)	Co-singer(s)	Note
Koi Jaane Na	"Har Funn Maula"	Tanishk Bagchi	Amitabh Bhattacharya	Zara Khan	
Pushpa: The Rise(D)	"Jaago Jaago Bakre"	Devi Sri Prasad	Raqueeb Alam		
Bhoot Police	"Aayi Aayi Bhoot Police"	Sachin–Jigar	Kumaar	Sunidhi Chauhan	
Bhoot Police	"Raat Gayi So Baat Gayi"	Sachin–Jigar	Kumaar	Asees Kaur	
Chandigarh Kare Aashiqui	"Kheench Te Nach"	Sachin–Jigar	Vayu	Shalmali Kholgade, Brijesh Shandilya	
Toofan	"Gehre Andhere"	Shankar-Ehsaan-Loy	Javed Akhtar		

=== 2022 ===
Film	Song	Composer(s)	Writer(s)	Co-singer(s)	Note
Jayeshbhai Jordaar	"Firecracker"	Vishal-Shekhar	Kumaar, Vayu	Shekhar Ravjiani	
Jayeshbhai Jordaar	"Firecracker" (English)	Vishal-Shekhar	Vishal Dadlani, Kumaar, Vayu	Shekhar Ravjiani	
Jayeshbhai Jordaar	"Jordaar"	Vishal-Shekhar	Jaideep Saini	Keerthi Sagathia	
Vikram Vedha	"Alcoholia"	Vishal-Shekhar	Manoj Muntashir	Shekhar Ravjiani, Snigdhajit Bhowmik, Ananya Chakraborty	
Vikram Vedha	"O Sahiba"	Vishal-Shekhar	Manoj Muntashir	Shekhar Ravjiani	
Bhediya	"Jungle Mein Kaand"	Sachin-Jigar	Amitabh Bhattacharya	Sukhwinder Singh, Siddharth Basrur	
Ram Setu	"Whatte Fun"	Ajay-Atul	Irshad Kamil	Neeti Mohan, Arivu	
Middle Class Love	"Kisko Tha Pata"	Himesh Reshammiya	Mayur Puri		

=== 2023 ===
Film	Song	Composer(s)	Writer(s)	Co-singer(s)	Note
Kuttey	"Awaara Dogs"	Vishal Bhardwaj	Gulzar		
Kuttey	"Dhan Te Nan Returns"	Vishal Bhardwaj	Gulzar	Sukhwinder Singh	
Pathaan	"Besharam Rang"	Vishal–Shekhar	Kumaar, Vishal Dadlani	Shilpa Rao, Caralisa Monteiro, Shekhar Ravjiani	
Farzi	"Paisa Hai Toh"	Sachin-Jigar	Jigar Saraiya	Sachin-Jigar, MellowD	Web Series
Kisi Ka Bhai Kisi Ki Jaan	"Yentamma"	Payal Dev	Shabbir Ahmed	Payal Dev, Raftaar	
Jawan	"Not Ramaiya Vastavaiya"	Anirudh Ravichander	Kumaar	Anirudh Ravichander, Shilpa Rao	
Tumse Na Ho Payega	"Jamoore"	Abhishek Arora, Ananya Purkayastha	Kausar Munir		
Sam Bahadur	"Badhte Chalo"	Shankar-Ehsaan-Loy	Gulzar	Shankar Mahadevan	

=== 2024 ===
Film	Song	Composer(s)	Writer(s)	Co-singer(s)	Note
Yudhra	Hatt Jaa Baaju	Shankar–Ehsaan–Loy	Javed Akhtar	Kelly Dlima, Arsh Mohammed	
Dukaan	Rang Maar De Holi Hai"	Shreyas Puranik		Sunidhi Chauhan, Bhoomi Trivedi, Osman Mir	
Bade Miyan Chhote Miyan	"Wallah Habibi"	Vishal Mishra	Irshad Kamil	Vishal Mishra, Dipakshi Kalita	

=== 2025 ===
Film	Song	Composer(s)	Writer(s)	Co-singer(s)
Dhoom Dhaam	"Haseeno"	Shor Police	Siddhant Kaushal	Neuman Pinto
Param Sundari	"Danger"	Sachin-Jigar	Amitabh Bhattacharya	Parvathi Meenakshi
The Ba***ds of Bollywood	"Number 1 (Title Track)"	Ujwal Gupta	Kumaar	
The Ba***ds of Bollywood	"Who's Your Daddy"	Shashwat Sachdev	Akshat Verma, Vishal Dadlani	Shashwat Sachdev
The Ba***ds of Bollywood	"Revolver"	Aryan Khan, Raja Kumari	Raja Kumari, Piyush Kapoor, Shashwat Sachdev	
The Ba***ds of Bollywood	"Movie Scene"	Karan Aujla	Karan Aujla, Shashwat Sachdev	Karan Aujla, Piyush Kapoor, Aryan Khan, Shashwat Sachdev
Tu Meri Main Tera Main Tera Tu Meri	"Tu Meri Main Tera Main Tera Tu Meri - Title Track"	Vishal–Shekhar	Anvita Dutt	Shekhar Ravjiani
Tu Meri Main Tera Main Tera Tu Meri	"Hum Dono"	Vishal–Shekhar	Anvita Dutt	Shekhar Ravjiani, Shruti Pathak

=== 2026 ===
Film	Song	Composer(s)	Writer(s)	Co-singer(s)	Note
Ikka	"Woh Ikka Hai"	Mithoon	Sayeed Quadri	Raja Kumari	Streaming release

== Other languages ==
=== Marathi songs ===
Year	Film/Album	Song	Composer(s)	Writer(s)	Co-singer(s)	Ref.
2013	Balak-Palak	"Kalla"	Vishal–Shekhar	Guru Thakur		
2015	Timepass 2	"Waou Waou"	Chinar-Mahesh			
2015	Sata Lota Pan Sagla Khota	"Saata Lota"	Siddharth Mahadevan Soumil Shringarpure	Shrirang Godbole		
2017	Zindagi Virat	"Malhar"	Suraj-Dhiraj			
2018	Bogda	"Banjaara"	Siddharth Mahadevan, Soumil Shringarpure	Manndar Cholkar		
2022	Ved	"Ved Lavlay"	Ajay-Atul	Ajay-Atul	Ajay Gogavale	
2022	Ananya	Tu Dhagdhgti Aag"	Sameer Saptiskar			
2024	Dharmaveer 2	"Chal Karu Taiyari"	Avinash-Vishwajeet	Prasad Biware	Bela Shende	
2024	Gharat Ganpati	"Hey Pori"	Sanket Sane	Alok Sutar		
2024	Musafiraa	"Musafiraa"	Rohan-Rohan	Mandar Cholkar	Solo	
2025	Banjara	Banjara Title Track	Avadhoot Gupte	Guru Thakur	Solo	

=== Kannada songs ===
Year	Film/Album	Song	Composer(s)	Writer(s)	Co-singer(s)	Ref.
2013	Andhar Bahar	"Andar Bahar"	Vijay Prakash		Suzanne D'Mello	
2014	Ninnindale	"Don't Care"	Mani Sharma	Kaviraj		
2022	Vijayanand	"Huttoku Munchene Surya"	Gopi Sundar	Nagarjun Sharma		

=== Tamil songs ===
Year	Film/Album	Song	Composer(s)	Writer(s)	Co-singer(s)	Ref.
2013	Vanakkam Chennai	"Oh Penne"	Anirudh Ravichander	Na. Muthukumar	Anirudh Ravichander, Arjun	
2014	Kaththi	"Aathi"	Anirudh Ravichander	P. Vijay	Anirudh Ravichander	
2014	Kaaki Sattai	"Kaaki Sattai"	Anirudh Ravichander	Na. Muthukumar		
2015	Romeo Juliet	"Thoovaanam"	D. Imman	Thamarai	Sunitha Sarathy	
2015	Romeo Juliet	"Romeo Romeo"	D. Imman	Madhan Karky	Hyde Karty	
2015	10 Endrathukulla	Pathu Endrathukulla	D. Imman	Mani Amudhavan		
2015	Vedalam	"Veera Vinayaka"	Anirudh Ravichander	Viveka	Anirudh Ravichander	
2016	Miruthan	"Munnal Kadhali"	D. Imman	Madhan Karky		
2016	Pokkiri Raja	Athuvutta (Reprise)"	D. Imman	Vivek, MC Rude	MC Rude	
2017	Saravanan Irukka Bayamaen	"Semma Joru"	D. Imman	Yugabharathi	Maria Kavita Thomas	

=== Telugu songs ===
Year	Film/Album	Song	Composer(s)	Writer(s)	Co-singer(s)	Ref.
2006	Dhoom 2 (dubbed)	"Dhoom Again"	Pritam	Asif Ali Baig	Dominique Cerejo	
2007	Ta Ra Rum Pum (dubbed)	"Natho Forever"	Vishal–Shekhar	Rajshri Sudhakar	Shankar Mahadevan, Shreya Ghoshal	
2009	Prayanam	"Theme Song"	Mahesh Shankar	Ananta Sriram	Ranjith, Smita, Pop Shalini, Mynampati Sreeram Chandra	
2016	Sarrainodu	"Athilokasundari"	S. Thaman	Ramajogayya Sastry, Bunny Suresh	Karhtik	
2018	Naa Peru Surya	"Sainika"	Vishal–Shekhar	Ramajogayya Sastry		
2020	Solo Brathuke So Better	"Solo Brathuke So Better"	S. Thaman	Sirivennela Seetharama Sastry		
2021	Shyam Singha Roy	"Rise of Shyam"	Mickey J. Meyer	Krishna Kanth	Anurag Kulkarni, Cizzy	
2024	Saripodhaa Sanivaaram	"Garam Garam"	Jakes Bejoy	Sanapati Bharadwaj Patrudu		
2025	Andhra King Taluka	"Chalu"	Vivek–Mervin	Chandrabose	Vivek Siva	
2026	Ustaad Bhagat Singh	"Dekhlenge Saala"	Devi Sri Prasad	Bhaskarabhatla		
2026	Mana Shankara Vara Prasad Garu	"Mega Victory Mass"	Bheems Ceciroleo	Kasarla Shyam	Nakash Aziz	

=== Bengali songs ===
Year	Film/Album	Song	Composer(s)	Writer(s)	Co-singer(s)	Ref.
2013	Hawa Bodol	Ghore Pherar Gaan"	Indradeep Dasgupta			
2017	One	One (Title Track)	Arindam Chatterjee	Prasen	Raftaar	

=== Gujarati songs ===
Year	Film/Album	Song	Composer(s)	Writer(s)	Co-singer(s)	Ref.
2016	Wrong Side Raju	"Zindabad Re"	Sachin–Jigar	Niren Bhatt		
2016	Wrong Side Raju	"Amdavad Re"	Sachin–Jigar	Niren Bhatt		
2023	Lakiro	Tu Nathi Ke Tu Chhe	Parth Bharat Thakkar		Shilpa Rao, Parth Bharat	
2024	Fakt Purusho Maate	"Fakt Purusho Maate - Title Track"	Kedar and Bhargav			

=== Malayalam songs ===
Year	Film/Album	Song	Composer(s)	Writer(s)	Co-singer(s)	Ref.
2019	Moothon	"Bhai Re"	Sagar Desai	Neeraj Pandey		
