= Anjaana Anjaani (soundtrack) =

Soundtrack album by Vishal–Shekhar
- Released: 27 August 2010
- Recorded: 2009–2010
- Genre: Feature film soundtrack
- Length: 42:17
- Language: Hindi
- Label: T-Series
- Producer: Vishal–Shekhar

Vishal–Shekhar chronology
I Hate Luv Storys (2010)	Anjaana Anjaani (2010)	Break Ke Baad (2010)

Anjaana Anjaani is the soundtrack album to the 2010 film of the same name directed by Siddharth Anand and produced by Sajid Nadiadwala starring Ranbir Kapoor and Priyanka Chopra. The album featured nine songs composed by the duo Vishal–Shekhar with lyrics written by Neelesh Misra, Vishal Dadlani, Shekhar Ravjiani, Amitabh Bhattacharya, Anvita Dutt Guptan, Kumaar, Kausar Munir and Irshad Kamil. The album was released on 27 August 2010 by T-Series. The album received high critical acclaim for its variety in genres and cited as one of the best works from the duo, and they further received a nomination at the Filmfare Award for Best Music Director for their work in the album.

== Development ==
Vishal–Shekhar and Salim–Sulaiman, who previously associated with Anand on Salaam Namaste (2005), Ta Ra Rum Pum (2007) and Bachna Ae Haseeno (2008), composed the soundtrack and background score for Anjaana Anjaani, respectively. Anand provided the brief to make music that cannot be understood on first listen and eventually grow on the listener. This resulted in them curating the album, which was "something new and crazy". According to the producer Nadiadwala, "the music travels with the script and you can literally feel the characters through the music. There are songs that talk about the joy of meeting and then there are others that take you through the pain of separation."

The duo had composed two title tracks for the film; one being a slow-paced number, the other is a fast-paced club song. The latter had a hook line after stutter, which Ravjiani developed during the jamming session, in order to make it different from other Bollywood party numbers; the duo admitted that "We never even thought of it as a stutter. Just a different way to say the words." The song was further reminiscent of R. D. Burman's compositions. The former was a slow-paced number which had scratch vocals by Dadlani and female portions by Shilpa Rao. Initially, Dadlani wanted KK to record the song, but as the latter became busy on concert tours, Dadlani had to finalize his version for the song.

When the duo composed "Hairat", they were initially skeptical to include the song in this film, as it was a "heavy" number, but Anand eventually approved for it. The song was record by Lucky Ali in a lower tempo which had to be generated electronically, and Ravjiani gained assistance from the sound engineer and recordist Calvin Vaz to tweak those sounds. Rahat Fateh Ali Khan, was chosen to record "Aas Paas Khuda" as they wanted "a voice that could make the high-notes pierce ones consciousness". The hook phrase was written by Ravjiani while the rest of the lyrics are by Dadlani. Hitesh Sonik programmed the track to be a "rock-ballad" number.

For "Tumse Hi Tumse", the duo had conceptualized six drafts of the song and took 40 days for the orchestration and programming. Monteiro was brought on board to write lyrics for the portions she would record. For the remaining portions, Ravjiani used some of the unused lyrics for the mukhda part, written by Guptan—who initially wrote another song composed by the duo, which was not related to the film—which Anand liked it. However, Guptan left to London for the filming of Patiala House (2011), which resulted in Amitabh Bhattacharya to write the remainder of the portions. The drum portions were played by Shiraz Bhattacharya from Pentagram, who previously collaborated with the duo on their debut film Pyaar Mein Kabhi Kabhi (1999).

The song "Tujhe Bhula Diya" was recorded in Dadlani's voice, but as he had earlier recorded two songs before this number, Anand was not satisfied. As Shankar Mahadevan and KK were inaccessible, Dadlani approached Mohit Chauhan to record the number, who has "a natural and beautiful way with melody, that has only enhanced the song". Ravjiani performed the qawwali verses of that track. "I Feel Good" is the second duet number recorded by Dadlani and Rao. Like the title track, Dadlani had initially recorded scratch vocals for this number, and intended to approach few singers for the song, but "the high note on the chorus was becoming problematic" which resulted him to retain his vocals. Rao was chosen to record the track after a rehearsal on Vishal and Shekhar's Studio as it suited Chopra's character perfectly. Abhijit Vaghani produced and programmed the soundtrack.

== Reception ==
The soundtrack received widespread critical acclaim, with high praise for the fresh compositions, and considered it to be the composer duo's best soundtrack to date. Bollywood Hungama's Joginder Tuteja gave a rating of 4 out of 5, calling it "fantastic," writing: "This one has a classy touch all through with a mix of club tracks and soulful songs that rock the show in a big way [...] this is their best work till date." Nikhil Taneja of Hindustan Times called it as a "complete Bollywood album" being both "peppy" and "vibrant" and it "showcases the young urban sound that the duo has perfected". Jaspreet Pandohar of BBC wrote "Like a rough diamond that needs a good polish before it sparkles, with Anjaana Anjaani Vishal and Shekhar have produced another gem." Sukanya Verma of Rediff.com awarded 3 out of 5, saying "For all its aspired sweetness, Anjaana Anjaani's USP lies in its dynamic substance and stylish oomph."

Karthik Srinivasan of Milliblog wrote "It is usually expected that Vishal Shekhar get their sound very right; here they do – no surprises. The tunes do start to sound similar to their earlier soundtracks, but then they have this knack of getting perfect hooks that works big time. Anjaana Anjaani’s music is no exception." A reviewer based at Indo-Asian News Service (published on News18) described the album as a "robust mix of songs of different genres" which were both "entertaining and hummable and will appeal to the younger generation." Music critic Vipin Nair ranked the album at the 98th position in his Top 100 Bollywood Albums published under Film Companion; he further wrote "it had a couple of songs that reminded of their older works, but the way they packaged even those songs here was top notch."

== Track listing ==
No.	Title	Lyrics	Singer(s)	Length
1.	"Anjaana Anjaani Ki Kahani (Title Track 1)"	Neelesh Misra	Nikhil D'Souza, Monali Thakur	4:45
2.	"Hairat"	Vishal Dadlani	Lucky Ali	4:07
3.	"Aas Paas Khuda"	Vishal Dadlani, Shekhar Ravjiani	Rahat Fateh Ali Khan	5:19
4.	"Tumse Hi Tumse"	Amitabh Bhattacharya, Anvita Dutt Guptan, Caralisa Monteiro	Shekhar Ravjiani, Caralisa Monteiro	4:21
5.	"Tujhe Bhula Diya"	Kumaar, Vishal Dadlani	Mohit Chauhan, Shekhar Ravjiani, Shruti Pathak	4:39
6.	"I Feel Good"	Vishal Dadlani	Vishal Dadlani, Shilpa Rao	5:17
7.	"Anjaana Anjaani (Title Track 2)"	Kausar Munir, Irshad Kamil	Vishal Dadlani, Shilpa Rao	5:54
8.	"Tujhe Bhula Diya" (Remix – The Dance To Forget Mix)	Kumaar, Vishal Dadlani	Mohit Chauhan, Shekhar Ravjiani, Shruti Pathak, Abhijit Vaghani	4:29
9.	"Aas Paas Khuda" (Unplugged)	Vishal Dadlani, Shekhar Ravjiani	Rahat Fateh Ali Khan, Shruti Pathak	3:24

== Accolades ==
Award	Category	Recipient(s) and nominee(s)	Result	Ref.
Filmfare Awards	Best Music Director	Vishal–Shekhar	Nominated	
Zee Cine Awards	Best Music Director	Vishal–Shekhar	Nominated	
3rd Mirchi Music Awards	Song representing Sufi tradition	"Aas Pass Khuda"	Nominated	
