= Student of the Year 2 (soundtrack) =

Soundtrack album by Vishal–Shekhar
- Released: 26 April 2019
- Recorded: 2018–2019
- Genre: Feature film soundtrack
- Length: 24:29
- Languages: Hindi, Punjabi
- Label: Zee Music Company

Vishal–Shekhar chronology
Tiger Zinda Hai (2017)	Student of the Year 2 (2019)	Bharat (2019)
External audio
- Audio Jukebox on YouTube

Student of the Year 2 is the soundtrack album to the 2019 film of the same name directed by Punit Malhotra and produced by Dharma Productions, which served as the spiritual successor of Student of the Year (2012), starring Tiger Shroff, Tara Sutaria and Ananya Panday. The film's soundtrack was composed by Vishal–Shekhar with lyrics written by Anvita Dutt Guptan, Kumaar and Vayu Shrivastav, and was released under the banner of Zee Music Company on 26 April 2019.

== Release ==
The album preceded with the first song "The Jawani Song" released on 18 April 2019. The song is a recreation of "Yeh Jawani Hai Deewani", originally sung by Kishore Kumar and composed by R. D. Burman for the soundtrack to the film Jawani Diwani (1972); the version had additional vocals provided by Vishal Dadlani and Payal Dev. The song "Mumbai Dilli Di Kudiyaan" was released at a launch event held at Mumbai on 24 April 2019 with the lead actors in attendance. It served as the promotional song and was not featured in the film. The soundtrack was released under the Zee Music Company label on 26 April.

== Track listing ==
No.	Title	Lyrics	Singer(s)	Length
1.	"The Jawaani Song"	Anand Bakshi, Anvita Dutt Guptan	Kishore Kumar, Vishal Dadlani, Payal Dev	4:13
2.	"Mumbai Dilli Di Kudiyaan"	Vayu Shrivastav	Dev Negi, Payal Dev, Vishal Dadlani	3:29
3.	"The Hook Up Song"	Kumaar	Neha Kakkar, Shekhar Ravjiani	3:33
4.	"Fakira"	Anvita Dutt Guptan	Sanam Puri, Neeti Mohan	4:48
5.	"Main Bhi Nahin Soya"	Anvita Dutt Guptan	Arijit Singh	5:17
6.	"Jatt Ludhiyane Da"	Anvita Dutt Guptan (Rap Lyrics: Parry G)	Vishal Dadlani, Payal Dev (Rap: Deane Sequeira)	3:09
Total length:				24:29

== Critical reception ==
Reviewing the soundtrack, Pratishruti Ganguly of Firstpost wrote, "The jukebox of Student of the Year proved to be a fitting pop culture confectionery for a Bollywood-obsessed fandom that grew up munching on romantic comedies [...] Unfortunately, tracks like "Hook Up Song" and "Mumbai Dilli Ki Kudiyan" perhaps indicate that the understanding of the "jawaan" [transl. youth] pulse is a tad misguided in this film". Devarsi Ghosh of Scroll.in wrote "Vishal-Shekhar's soundtrack for Student Of The Year 2 is committed to the film's vision of being a High School Musical-like fantasy. Four out of the six songs are club bangers with a mix of Hindi-Punjabi lyrics. Vishal-Shekhar successfully bring freshness to the format, which is a testament to their impeccable grasp over dance music over the years."

Debarati S Sen of The Times of India wrote "[Vishal–Shekhar] have managed to bring a fresh perspective to the soundscape in SOTY 2. While three of the six tracks are written by Anvita Dutt, four songs in the album are purely dance tracks and have a mix of Hindi-Punjabi lyrics. Vishal-Shekhar affirms their reputation as a music duo with an impeccable grasp on dance music. They not only bring in an easy freshness to the format, but the deft use of guitars, strings, trumpets, saxophone are applaud-worthy. This comes to the fore even when they contemporarise a classic." Joginder Tuteja of Bollywood Hungama wrote "One expected the music of Student of the Year 2 to be largely fun and youthful, and in that aspect the soundtrack does well. There are half a dozen songs in there and while a couple of these are set to be chartbusters, another couple is set to grow in days to come."

Kshamaya Daniel of Rediff.com wrote "The musical score composed by Vishal Shekhar was perhaps the best part of the film with three catchy tracks: Hook Up, Yeh Jawaani Hai Deewani and Mumbai Dilli Di Kudiya." Ankur Pathak of HuffPost criticized the music to be "largely forgettable". Tarun Bharadwaj of The Financial Express wrote "Music is not impressive either, songs come and go without moving beyond your ear lobes barring Kishore Kumar's evergreen Yeh Jawani Hai Deewani."

== Accolades ==
Award Ceremony	Category	Recipient	Result	Ref.
Zee Cine Awards	Best Playback Singer – Female	Neha Kakkar ("The Hookup Song")	Nominated	
12th Mirchi Music Awards	Recreated Song of the Year	Payal Dev, Vishal Dadlani and Anvita Dutt Guptan ("The Jawani Song")	Nominated	
