= Fashion (soundtrack) =

Soundtrack album by Salim–Sulaiman
- Released: 25 September 2008
- Recorded: 2008
- Genre: Feature film soundtrack
- Length: 47:26
- Language: Hindi
- Label: T-Series
- Producer: UTV Motion Pictures

Salim–Sulaiman chronology
Roadside Romeo (2008)	Fashion (2008)	Rab Ne Bana Di Jodi (2008)

Fashion is the soundtrack album to the 2008 film of the same name. The film, directed by Madhur Bhandarkar which he co-produced it with UTV Motion Pictures, stars Priyanka Chopra, Kangana Ranaut and Mugdha Godse. Salim–Sulaiman composed the film's 10-song soundtrack which included four original tracks, a theme music and five remixes. Sandeep Nath wrote lyrics for the song "Fashion Ka Jalwa" while Irfan Siddiqui wrote the remainder of it. The album was released by T-Series on 19 September 2008 to positive reviews from critics.

== Background ==
Salim–Sulaiman composed the soundtrack and background score to Fashion. According to the duo, curating the album presented them numerous challenges, including the film's title track. While they tried to keep suitable words for the word "fashion", Salim called it as a disastrous as the word itself had numerous restrictions and they had the track to appeal to the masses. When Bhandarkar came to the studio, the duo explained this to the former, to which he replied "kuch jalwa kar de" (transl. make some magic). As Salim recalled on Bhandarkar's habit of saying "jalwa", he described this as a hook line to the track.

While composing the song "Mar Jawaan", Bhandarkar suggested "a little raucous voice" similar to the lines of Abida Parveen. As the duo being in touch with Shruti Pathak, they invited her to the studio, during which she played a Gujarati song and sang it in lower octaves. The initial song was pitched in higher octaves, and being impressed with her voice, he changed the pitch to a lower octave and sing it the way so that it could become a romantic number.

All the songs in the film were initially treated as montages, while the album version would be a bit lengthy. The song "Mar Jawaan" only had a 30-second bit as it is played during the fashion show, and only one verse was used in the film. The reception of that musical piece prompted them to compose it as a full-fledged number.

== Release ==
The film's music was launched by Bhandarkar and the cast on 25 September 2008 at the Siddhivinayak Temple in Mumbai. The cast played the film's title song, offering their first CD to Lord Ganesha.

== Reception ==
Fashion's soundtrack received positive reviews from critics. Meghna Menon of Hindustan Times rated the album 3.5 out of 5 and said, "It's very hard to find anything wrong with the album. Salim-Suleiman have done a wonderful job as composers and have brought out the essence of the movie in a remarkable way. Irfan has come out with great lyrics and every singer has given his or her best shot." Joginder Tuteja of Bollywood Hungama described the album as "a winner all the way", and said, "Madhur Bhandarkar films haven't been known for their music, even though the albums of Page 3 and Corporate still saw some sales on the stands. However, Fashion is all set to break the jinx while turning out to be the first Madhur Bhandarkar film ever to boast of a truly mass as well as class appealing score". Sukanya Verma of Rediff.com rated the album 3.5 out of 5, and said that the film offers a well-designed mix of trendy tunes and refined melodies. Karthik Srinivasan of Milliblog wrote "Salim Sulaiman come up with an effective, self-assured sound in Fashion".

The album sold 1 million units and is the year's 16th highest selling Bollywood soundtrack album.

== Track listing ==
No.	Title	Lyrics	Music	Singer(s)	Length
1.	"Fashion Ka Jalwa"	Sandeep Nath	Salim–Sulaiman	Sukhwinder Singh, Satya Hinduja, Robert Bob Omulo	4:43
2.	"Mar Jawaan"	Irfan Siddiqui	Salim–Sulaiman	Salim Merchant, Shruti Pathak	4:01
3.	"Kuch Khaas Hai"	Irfan Siddiqui	Salim–Sulaiman	Mohit Chauhan, Neha Bhasin	5:03
4.	"Aashiyaana"	Irfan Siddiqui	Salim–Sulaiman	Salim Merchant	5:29
5.	"Fashion Ka Jalwa" (Remix by DJ A-Myth)	Sandeep Nath	Salim–Sulaiman	Sukhwinder Singh, Satya Hinduja, Robert Bob Omulo	4:40
6.	"Mar Jawaan" (Remix by DJ A-Myth)	Irfan Siddiqui	Salim–Sulaiman	Salim Merchant, Shruti Pathak	4:26
7.	"Kuch Khaas Hai" (Remix by DJ A-Myth)	Irfan Siddiqui	Salim–Sulaiman	Mohit Chauhan, Neha Bhasin	4:17
8.	"Theme of Fashion" (Remix by Karsh Kale and Midival Punditz)	Irfan Siddiqui	Karsh Kale and Midival Punditz	Various artists	6:15
9.	"Aashiyaana" (Remix by DJ A-Myth)	Irfan Siddiqui	Salim–Sulaiman	Salim Merchant	5:50
10.	"Theme of Fashion"	Irfan Siddiqui	Salim–Sulaiman	Various artists	4:02

== Accolades ==
Award	Date of ceremony (Note: Date is linked to the article about the awards held that year, wherever possible.)	Category	Recipient(s) and nominee(s)	Result	Ref(s)
Apsara Film & Television Producers Guild Awards (Note: Also known as Star Guild Awards.)	6 December 2009	Best Lyricist	Irfan Siddique for "Mar Jaava"	Nominated	
Filmfare Awards	28 February 2009	Best Female Playback Singer	Neha Bhasin for "Kuch Khaas"	Nominated	
Filmfare Awards	28 February 2009	Best Female Playback Singer	Shruti Pathak for "Mar Jaava"	Nominated	
Screen Awards	14 January 2009	Best Female Playback	Shruti Pathak for "Mar Jaava"	Nominated	
