= Solar flare (disambiguation) =

A solar flare is an intense emission of electromagnetic radiation from the Sun.

Solar flare, solar flares, or Sun flare may also refer to:

== Arts, entertainment, and media ==
=== Television ===
- "Solar Flare", an episode of Stars on Mars
- Solar Flare, a character in Mighty Med

=== Musical works ===
- Solar : Flare, an album by Lunarsolar, 2020
- "Solar Flares", a song on Robert Wyatt's Ruth Is Stranger Than Richard album, 1975
- "Solar Flare", a song on Djam Karet's Collaborator (album), 1994
- "Solar Flare", a song on Embrace (Endorphin album), 1998
- "Solar Flare", a song on 311's Don't Tread on Me (album), 2005
- "Solar Flare", a song on Terraformer (Knut album), 2005

=== Video games ===
- Solar Flare, a character in Plants vs. Zombies Heroes
- Solar Flare, a Geometry Dash demon level

== Other uses ==
- Rosa 'Sun Flare', a rose cultivar
- Solar Flare, a ride at Galaxyland

== See also ==
- Flare (disambiguation)
- Super flare
- Flare star
