= Flare (disambiguation) =

A flare is a device that produces brilliant light and intense heat without explosion, used for lighting, signaling, decoration or as aerial defense countermeasure

Flare may also refer to:

== Astronomy ==
- Flare star, a variable star that can undergo unpredictable dramatic increases in brightness for a few minutes
- Satellite flare, a phenomenon caused by the reflective surfaces on satellites
- Solar flare, an eruption of plasma from the surface of the Sun

== Aviation ==
- Landing flare, a technique used in landing an aircraft where the descent rate is gradually reduced until the landing gear gently touches the ground or runway
- Flare (countermeasure), an aerial countermeasure against heat-seeking missiles
- Flarecraft, a wing-in-ground effect vehicle

== Computing and Technology ==
- Flare Technology, a defunct computer hardware company
- Xara Flare, a file format in computing
- Flare (phone), an Android smartphone

== Culture, Arts, Media, and Entertainment ==
- Flare (Techno-Cultural Fest), a techno-cultural fest, celebrated every year at Pandit Deendayal Petroleum University
- Bell-bottoms, a style of trousers sometimes referred to as "flares"
- Team Flare, a fictional villainous team from Pokémon X and Y
- The central disease in The Maze Runner (book series)
- Flare (film), a 2014 French-Japanese film starring Mayuko Fukuda
- Flare (album), a 2008 album by Hitomi Shimatani
- Flare (scratch), a type of scratch used by turntablists
- "Flare", a song by pop punk band Relient K on the album Forget and Not Slow Down
- Flare, a female hero who is a member of the League of Champions
- Flare (magazine), a Canadian fashion and style magazine
- Flare (novel), a 1992 book by Roger Zelazny and Thomas Timoux Thomas
- The Flare, a fictional TV series with an aftershow What Just Happened??! with Fred Savage
- "Flare", a song by Disarmonia Mundi from their EP The Restless Memoirs, from Nebularium
- Flare U, a South Korean musical duo
- Flare (acrobatic move), an acrobatic move employed in breakdancing and gymnastics

== Engineering ==
- Flare (ship), a descriptive measure of hull shape
- MV Flare, a 1972 Cypriot-registered bulk carrier
- Flare fitting, an expansion flare on the end of a pipe in plumbing
- Gas flare or "flare stack", a gas combustion device used at industrial plants and work sites, especially those involving petroleum or natural gas
- Routine flaring, the practice of disposing of massive amounts of petroleum gas during crude oil extraction

== Medicine ==
- Flare-up, a recurrence or aggravation of symptoms of a medical condition
- An occurrence during slit lamp examinations

== Photography ==
- Lens flare, unwanted reflections in optical systems that are a problem in photography and astronomy
- Fluid-attenuated inversion recovery, a pulse sequence used in magnetic resonance imaging, a medical diagnostic tool

== Horseracing ==
- Flares (horse) (born 1933), American-bred, British-trained Thoroughbred racehorse

== See also ==
- Flair (disambiguation)
- Solar flare (disambiguation)
