= Flair =

Flair can refer to:

- Flair (miniseries), a 1990 Australian miniseries
- Flair (pens), a brand of felt tip pens
- Flair (horse), a Thoroughbred racehorse
- Flair, a short-lived magazine edited by Fleur Cowles
- The Flair family of American professional wrestlers (actual family name Fliehr):
  - Ric Flair (born 1949), family patriarch
  - David Flair (born 1979), older son
  - Charlotte Flair (born 1986), ring name of daughter Ashley
  - Reid Flair (1988–2013), younger son
- The Flairs, an American doo-wop group in the 1950s
- Flair Records, a record label
- Flair bartending
- Fluid-attenuated inversion recovery (FLAIR), an MRI imaging technique
- Flair Software, a British video game developer and publisher
- Flair Airlines, a Canadian low-fare airline
- Decorative buttons adorning wait staff uniforms in the movie Office Space

== See also ==
- Flare (disambiguation)
