= Student of the Year 2 =

2019 Indian film by Punit Malhotra

- Theatrical release poster
- Directed by: Punit Malhotra
- Written by: Arshad Sayed
- Produced by: Hiroo Yash Johar; Karan Johar; Apoorva Mehta
- Starring: Tiger Shroff; Tara Sutaria; Ananya Panday; Aditya Seal
- Cinematography: Ravi K. Chandran
- Edited by: Ritesh Soni
- Music by: Songs: Vishal–Shekhar; Score: Salim–Sulaiman
- Production company: Dharma Productions
- Distributed by: Fox Star Studios
- Release date: 10 May 2019 (India)
- Running time: 146 minutes
- Country: India
- Language: Hindi
- Budget: ₹65 crore
- Box office: est. ₹98.16 crore

Student of the Year 2 is a 2019 Indian Hindi-language sports romantic comedy film directed by Punit Malhotra and produced Karan Johar's Dharma Productions. A standalone sequel to the 2012 film Student of the Year, it stars Tiger Shroff, Tara Sutaria, Ananya Panday, and Aditya Seal. It marks the debuts of both Panday and Sutaria in Hindi cinema.

Student of the Year 2 was released in on 10 May 2019. Upon its release the film was panned by critics, with criticism directed at the script, unreal situations and unrealistic depiction of Indian schools and colleges, although Shroff's action sequences were praised. Holding a rating of 6% on Rotten Tomatoes, it is among the lowest-rated Indian films. It did an average business at the box office with a worldwide collection of ₹98.16 crore against its ₹65 crore budget.

== Plot ==
Rohan Sachdev, a middle-class student, decides to go to the affluent St. Teresa's College after his childhood sweetheart, Mridula Chawla aka Mia transfers there. The two begin a relationship when Rohan wins the college over by showing his sports skills. Rohan becomes friends with Manav Singh Randhawa, the reigning "Student of the Year" and the son of a wealthy school donor, Sukesh Singh Randhawa. Rohan is at odds with Manav's sister Shreya Randhawa, a popular girl at the college, who detests and insults him one day. One of her pranks creates a rift between Rohan and his friends from his previous school.

Rohan-Mia and Manav-Shreya are coupled up for a dance competition which the latter wins after Mia falters. Rohan finds Mia getting intimate with Manav and realizes that he had deliberately planted her to spoil Rohan's image. He gives Manav a tight slap for stealing her. The next day, Manav was enraged and slapping the son of a school trustee, Rohan is expelled from the college and friend is later brutally beaten up by Manav and his friends and knocked out of the college unconscious. Initially discouraged, he eventually comes back and challenges Manav for the Student of the Year trophy.

However, Rohan returns to his old school, Pishorilal, where Shreya, impressed by his sincerity, helps him make amends with his old friends. She also convinces him to join her in a national dance competition. Shreya falls in love with him as they practice. Meanwhile, Mia finds Rohan and apologizes to him for leaving him as Manav had cheated on her. The trio then have coffee together to hang out with each other. Mia tries to convince Rohan to get back with her, but Shreya insists against it and an argument starts between Mia and Shreya where the latter accidentally spills coffee over the former.

During an inter-school multi-event tournament, a fight breaks out between Pishorilal and St. Teresa's students, ending in Rohan's teammate Abhishek being badly injured. At the hospital, Mia holds Rohan's hand in front of Shreya to show that they had reconciled. She apologizes to Mia and after blessing them with happiness, she leaves. Rohan follows her and professes his love, but she refuses. Pishorilal manages to climb up the ranks and reach the final against St. Teresa. On the second night, Mia tries to kiss Rohan, but he refuses, saying that it was time to focus on accomplishing something. Although upset, she decides to support him and they become friends.

Before the final, he confesses his love to Shreya again, which she accepts when he tells her that Mia was just a friend. Shreya and Mia support Pishorilal in the match. Encouraged, Rohan helps his team fight and win the tournament, defeating St. Teresa is crowd. Rohan and Shreya embrace, while Mia leaves smiling, knowing that Rohan's dream of being the Student of the Year will now come true. Pishorilal celebrates their first-ever victory, and Rohan becomes the Student of the Year, leaving Manav upset.

== Cast ==
- Tiger Shroff as Rohan Sachdev
  - Suryansh Kapoor as 15-year old Rohan
    - Madhav Dhingra as 9-year old Rohan
- Tara Sutaria as Mridula "Mia" Chawla
  - Suhani Sethi as 15-year old Mia
    - Dhanaya Madan as 9-year old Mia
- Ananya Panday as Shreya Randhawa
- Aditya Seal as Manav Singh Randhawa, Shreya's elder brother
- Harsh Beniwal as Puggi, Rohan's best friend, student of Pishorilal Chamandas College
- Samir Soni as Gujral, Dean of St. Teresa College
- Gul Panag as Kuljeet, Coach of St. Teresa College
- Abhishek Bajaj as Abhishek, Captain of Pishorilal Chamandas College team
- Manoj Pahwa as Randhir Mahipal, Coach of Pishorilal Chamandas College
- Ayesha Raza Mishra as Archana Singh, Dean of Pishorilal Chamandas College
- Rajesh Kumar as Prem Narayan Sachdev, Rohan's uncle
- Manasi Joshi Roy as Rohan's aunt
- Chetan Pandit as Sukesh Singh Randhawa, Shreya and Manav's father
- Samreen Kaur as Vandana Chawla, Mia's mother

=== Special appearances ===
- Will Smith in "The Jawaani Song"
- Alia Bhatt in "The Hook Up Song"
- Farah Khan as a judge in the dance contest
- Sahil Anand as Commentator Jeet Khurana; Anand reprises his role from the original
- Manjot Singh as Commentator Dimple "Dimpy" Singh; Singh reprises his role from the original
- Vishal Dadlani and Shekhar Ravjiani as judges in the dance contest

== Production ==
=== Development ===
Student of the Year 2 is a sequel to the 2012 Karan Johar-directed romantic comedy-drama Student of the Year. Shortly after the commercial success of the first film, a sequel was announced by the producers. In November 2017, a press release by Dharma Productions revealed that the sequel is slated to release in 2018; it would be directed by Punit Malhotra and star Tiger Shroff in one of the leading roles. The film was announced four years after Malhotra's previous directorial Gori Tere Pyaar Mein (2013). It was to be produced in association by Johar's Dharma Productions and Fox Star Studios. The film's announcement by the company initially conflicted with that of their another production, Dhadak (2018), which roused speculation that Ishaan Khatter would star in the film. Johar denied the news and stated that the reports were "baseless and untrue".

=== Casting ===
The announcement did not reveal the rest of the cast; media reports speculated that either Disha Patani or Ananya Panday, daughter of Chunky Pandey, would play the leading lady opposite Shroff. In April 2018, Johar announced that the film's female leads would be Panday and Tara Sutaria, both debutantes. Prior to confirming Student of the Year 2 as her film debut, Sutaria had auditioned for the role of Princess Jasmine in Disney's Aladdin (2019), but lost it to Naomi Scott; she also gave up an acting opportunity in Kabir Singh, which was released in June the same year. Television actor Abhishek Bajaj and Harsh Beniwal, a YouTuber, also make their film debuts. Beniwal, in preparation for the role, put on weight and grew a beard.

Malhotra stated that the two films have unrelated storylines: "The intention of the film is not to make this a Me Too of first part, so Tiger. It's a fresh take on the subject. It's more about sports and action". He was initially supposed to work on a different film with Shroff, but two-three months before filming, they scrapped the project and began working on a sequel to Student of the Year, with writer Arshad Sayed, who had also co-written Gori Tere Pyaar Mein with Malhotra, attached to duties for the story, screenplay and dialogues. In response to accusations that the film raised unhealthy expectations for college life, Shroff said, "What you see here is a fun school. It's a school that you want everyone to be a part of. We wanted everyone to fall in love with it". He plays an underdog in the film, expressing, "It's like Superman has been stripped of his powers".

Samir Soni, who had previously appeared in Malhotra's debut I Hate Luv Storys in 2010 and since shifted to direction, returned to acting by playing a college principal, a supporting role similar to the one originally portrayed by Rishi Kapoor in Student of the Year. However, the principal in the first film identified as gay, while the one played by Soni was heterosexual and more comical. Media outlets speculated that Sidharth Malhotra, Alia Bhatt and Varun Dhawan, who had starring debut roles in the 2012 original, would feature in a cameo appearance for a song. In May 2019, it was revealed that Bhatt would make a cameo in "The Hookup Song" alongside Shroff. Sahil Anand and Manjot Singh, who played the supporting roles of Jeet and Dimpy in the original, reprised their roles in the sequel, appearing as commentators.

As a part of Will Smith's Bucket List, Will Smith appeared in a song in the film for satisfying his wish of appearing in a Bollywood production.

=== Filming ===
Principal photography for Student of the Year 2 began on 9 April 2018 in Dehradun. Shortly afterwards, parts of the film were shot at Rishikesh and Mussoorie as part of the schedule. Major shots were also done at Guru Nanak Fifth Centenary School, adding an authentic touch to the film's backdrop. Sets for the film were also erected in Film City, Mumbai. After production was delayed, Sutaria quit Kabir Singh to resolve a scheduling conflict. In August 2018, a four-day sequence was filmed in Thailand. Filming ended in September 2018 with the shooting of the climax sequence. Student of the Year 2 was produced on an estimated budget of ₹650 million, including promotion and advertising costs.

== Soundtrack ==
The film's soundtrack was composed by Vishal–Shekhar with lyrics written by Anvita Dutt Guptan, Kumaar and first-time collaborator Vayu, and was released under the banner of Zee Music Company.

== Release ==
=== Theatrical ===
On 30 July 2018, a press release by Dharma Productions stated that the film's release date was postponed to 10 May 2019 due to what was speculated to be expected competition from the science fiction action film 2.0 (2018) starring Rajinikanth, Akshay Kumar and Amy Jackson.

=== Marketing ===
The film was announced via a first look poster featuring Shroff that was released on 20 November 2017 by Johar on various social media platforms; the poster carried the release date of 23 November 2018. In April 2018, first look posters featuring Sutaria and Panday announcing the new cast members were released; this was somewhat controversial owing to the cast being children of other actors, and this furthered the long-standing accusations of Johar promoting nepotism.

Two new teaser posters were released on 10 April 2019 presenting Shroff's look as a student. Another set of posters featuring Sutaria and Panday were released on 11 April 2019. On 12 April 2019, a theatrical release poster of the film was shared by Johar on his Instagram account;

Student of the Year 2's teaser trailer was released along with Kalank, which released on 17 April 2019. Kshamaya Daniel of Rediff.com wrote of the trailer, "While the cast and their acting looks promising enough, the storyline – not so much".

=== Home media ===
The film was made available as VOD on Amazon Prime Video on 1 September 2019.

== Reception ==
=== Box office ===
In India, the film had an average opening for the first shows with an occupancy rate of 20–25%. It went on to earn ₹11.75–12 crore on its first day in India, becoming the fifth highest opener of the year. The film had fair growth on Saturday, earning ₹13.5–13.75 crore. On Sunday, collections were affected by the IPL final and polling for the 2019 Indian general election, and the film's earning came down to ₹12.25–12.5 crore. By the following Friday, the film had a 60 percent drop as collections reached ₹1.5 crore. Following a drop in collections in the second week, the film stopped screening at most theatres. It has earned ₹98 crore worldwide, with ₹65 crore from India and ₹330 million (₹33 crore) overseas.

=== Critical response ===
Student of the Year 2 released to widely negative reviews from critics. It holds a rating of 6% on Rotten Tomatoes. Criticism was primarily directed to the script and unreal setting of the film.

Writing for Firstpost, Anna M. M. Vetticad gave the film one and a half stars out of five: "Cliché is piled on cliché in this unoriginal screenplay". Rajeev Masand of News18 gave it two stars out of five and said, "Student of the Year 2 is both predictable, and far from original... It isn't unwatchable, it's just unnecessary."

Saibal Chatterjee of NDTV gave it one and a half stars out of five and called the film "an egregiously escapist campus-rumpus musical in which nattily attired, unbelievably idle boys and skimpily clad girls... play games that make as much sense as a camel race on an airport tarmac", adding, "There isn't a single moment in the film that could be described as passable". Shubhra Gupta of The Indian Express gave one and a half stars out of five and expressed, "This class of 2019 has predictable beats, which is to be expected in an underdog story, but that it is so stilted is disappointing: from KJo [Karan Johar] I expect much more swish and sparkle". She felt Shroff "executes his dances-and-fights efficiently, even though [he] struggles to appear student-like".

Taran Adarsh of Bollywood Hungama praised the screenplay for being "praiseworthy as its peppered with some entertaining, dramatic and even moving moments". He wrote, "On the whole, Student of the Year 2 is an entertaining and an enjoyable fare which will strike a chord in the audience's hearts". Ronak Kotecha of The Times of India gave the film three stars out of five, writing that it "doesn't have that Ishq wala love, but there is ample dosti, high school drama and cool stuff to keep you going".

Meena Iyer of Daily News and Analysis gave it three stars out of five, writing, "This is the kind of film, which draws inspiration from the Archie comics with Tiger being Archie, flanked by a Veronica (Ananya) and Betty (Tara)". She concludes, "Apart from Will Smith's miss-if-you-blink appearance, watch [the film] for Tiger. Even when things around him are caving in, his ballerina grace is intact".

=== Accolades ===
Award Ceremony	Category	Recipient	Result	Ref.(s)
65th Filmfare Awards	Best Female Debut	Tara Sutaria	Nominated	
65th Filmfare Awards	Best Female Debut	Ananya Panday	Won	
21st IIFA Awards	Best Female Debut	Ananya Panday	Won	
Zee Cine Awards	Best Female Debut	Ananya Panday	Won	
Zee Cine Awards	Best Female Debut	Tara Sutaria	Won	
26th Screen Awards	Best Female Debut	Tara Sutaria	Nominated	
26th Screen Awards	Best Female Debut	Ananya Panday	Nominated	
Nickelodeon Kids' Choice Awards India	Favorite Movie Actor	Tiger Shroff	Nominated	
12th Mirchi Music Awards	Recreated Song of the Year	Payal Dev, Vishal Dadlani and Anvita Dutt Guptan ("The Jawani Song")	Nominated	
