= Tooh (song) =

Single by Mika Singh, Mamta Sharma, Shruti Pathak, Vishal Dadlani

from the album Gori Tere Pyaar Mein
- Language: Hindi
- Released: 12 October 2013 (Single); 9 October 2013 (Music video)
- Recorded: 2012–2013; Vishal & Shekhar's Studio, Bandra, Mumbai
- Genre: Pop; Electronic; Punjabi Folk; Filmi; Item number
- Length: 4:20 (Single); 2:22 (Music Video)
- Label: Sony Music India
- Composer: Vishal–Shekhar
- Lyricist: Anvita Dutt
- Producer: Abhijit Nalani

Music video
- "Tooh" on YouTube

Audio sample
- Tooh 25 second sample. Voices of Mamta Sharma, followed by that of Mika Singh. Note the repetition of the word Tooh.: file; help

"Tooh", a song composed by Vishal–Shekhar with lyrics by Anvita Dutt Guptan, is performed by playback singers Mika Singh and Mamta Sharma with backing vocals by Vishal Dadlani and Shruti Pathak. The song was the first single to be released digitally from the soundtrack of the 2013 film Gori Tere Pyaar Mein. The digital release was on 12 October 2013 in India. The music video was released on 9 October and launched on radio on 16 October.

A typical filmi song and item number, the song's video depicts the fun and humour that prevail at traditional Punjabi weddings.

== Background and composition ==
In an interview with radio jockey, Anuraag Pandey, Vishal–Shekhar revealed that the soundtrack being the second collaboration between Malhotra and them—after 2010s I Hate Luv Storys, they were involved right composing tunes with the completion of each draft of the script from the beginning in their studio (located in Bandra, Mumbai) in presence of Malhotra. During one such session four tunes were composed, the first being the final one based on the opinion of several people; who were asked to present their verdict on the best one.

"Tooh" was written by Anvita Dutt Guptan and produced by Abhijit Nalani. It was recorded at Vishal–Shekhar's personal studio in Bandra, Mumbai by recording engineers, Satchith Harve, Abhishek Ghatak and, Gauvrav Gupta—with the tune being mixed by Shekhar Ravjiani himself—and mastering by Chris Gehringer at Sterling Sound, New York City. The cover was released alongside the single on 9 October 2013 in ITunes and features the film's lead actors; Khan and Kapoor wearing a black kurta and blue lehnga respectively dancing in a joyous mood.

An item number, and wedding song aside from being a filmi number "Tooh" features an array of wedding song "paraphernalia" including brass synthesizer and dhol.

== Music video ==
The video was directed by the director of the film, Punit Malhotra. The costumes and choreography were done by Manish Malhotra and Remo D'Souza, respectively. It features Kareena Kapoor wearing the most elaborate of her six costumes for the film.

The video— begins with a group of Indian outfit (mostly sarees) wearing females dancing, a man wearing a turban standing between them. Kapoor appears in a huge hall prepared for hosting a Punjabi wedding; a sangeet (a type of bridal shower in north Indian wedding rituals). She along with women of different ages wearing sarees or lehngas dance on a stage. In front of the stage are several middle-aged men (wearing white Kurtas) dancing. Imran Khan appears, wearing a black kurta watching the girls on stage. The baraat then arrives at a well-lit and decorated bungalow; the bridegroom rides a horse (a custom of traditional north-western Indian weddings) and dancers in front of the procession in an alley leading to the bungalow with Khan, wearing a tuxedo, joining them. After the dancing, the video concludes as the duo embrace.

== Release and reception ==
The single was released on digital music platform ITunes on 12 October 2013, followed by a radio-release on 16 October 2013. It is the second item number featuring Kareena Kapoor; the first being "Fevicol Se" from the 2012 film Dabangg 2.

=== Reception ===
Upon release, "Tooh" received mixed reviews. Its lyrics were criticised for being objectionable; mediocre and unoriginal, along with the frequent use of the word "Tooh"— but was noted for its ecstatic and groovy nature. The dance steps from the song's music video caught on with revellers adding to the popularity of the single.

The song's lyrics include multiple instances of the word "Tooh"—Punjabi for "buttocks", which became controversial in India. The Central Board of Film Certification faced criticism for passing the song without objection, even though it included profanity. Shekhar Ravjiani, one of the song's composers, defended the song, refuting claims that the song is obscene.

The lyrics have also been criticised for their lack of poetry, which was the mainstay of songs in Bollywood classics like Pyaasa and Sujata. Lyricist Kausar Munir blames the attention span of the listeners and the commercial aspect of the films for the rude and offensive lyrics of modern songs; including those of "Tooh".

Despite criticism, the song received audiences appreciation; secured high positions in music charts. It reached second position in The Times of India Radio Mirchi Top 20 chart (Note: The chart is the collaborative effort of The Times of India and Radio Mirchi.) and ninth position in the BBC Asian Network chart, with a run of 11 weeks in the former and eight weeks in the latter.
