= Dream Out Loud =

DreamOut Loud
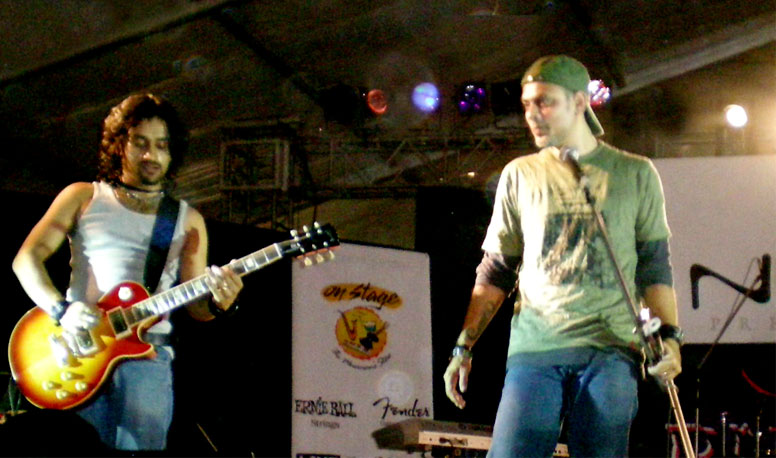
- DOL in a concert

Background information
- Genres: Indie rock, Bollywood Music
- Members: Suraj Jagan; Chandresh Kudwa; Sheldon Dixon; Melroy Coelho

Dream Out Loud (DOL) is an Indian indie rock band, formed by Suraj Jagan and Chandresh Kudwa. They had a three-minute cameo appearance in the Bollywood movie Rock On.

== Formation and early years (1999–2006) ==
The two principal members of the band, Suraj Jagan and Chandresh Kudwa, are from different backgrounds. Lead vocalist Jagan started his career in 1999 with a solo album, Musafir, which included the songs "Musafir", "Baadal", "Phir Aaye Teri Yaad", "Hamesha" and "Dil Se". The album, released by Milestone Entertainment Pvt Ltd, a licensee for EMI Music in India, was also recorded in Tamil and performed averagely on the market. Jagan subsequently moved in a more hard-rock direction, recording some original soundtracks for Bollywood, including:

Song	Movie
Dekh Dekh and Theme Song	Hijack
Zehreelay	Rock On!!
Title Song	Johnny Gaddar
Dum Lagaa	Dil Dosti Etc

Jagan also sang the jingle for a Hutch (Vodafone) advert.

Lead guitarist Kudwa previously played with bands including THOR, Freedom, jazz-rock band Nexus, and Vedic Chant. He also co-founded the Allegro Institute of Music, a guitar school. His online guitar school Theguitarthing.com also gives guitar lessons.

Dream Out Loud formed in January 2006, playing several concerts, including "Rock on for Humanity", in MMRDA Grounds, Mumbai, India on 31 October 2008, to raise funds for relief to victims of flooding in Bihar.

== Human race (2007–2008) ==
In June 2007, Dream Out Loud released their debut album Human Race, with Jagan on vocals, Kudwa on lead guitar and bass, and Lindsay on drums. The album was mastered by Bob Katz at Digital DomainTM in Florida. The album's release was followed by a number of gigs in Mumbai and Delhi, including a performance at the Eastwind Music Festival in New Delhi on 6 February. Influences for the album included Audioslave, System of a Down, Linkin Park, Steve Vai, and Joe Satriani.

=== Track listing ===
All lyrics written by Suraj Jagan.

Title	Music	Length
"Last Days on Earth"	Chandresh Kudwa	4:44
"So Far so good"	Chandresh Kudwa	5:03
"Prayer in your heart"	Chandresh Kudwa	3:18
"Better Days"	Chandresh Kudwa	3:58
"Habit"	Chandresh Kudwa	4:01
"Desire"	Chandresh Kudwa	4:02
"Human Beings"	Chandresh Kudwa	3:43
"Jigsaw"	Chandresh Kudwa	4:11
"Its Raining Now"	Chandresh Kudwa	3:19
"Now"	Chandresh Kudwa	5:29

== Musical style ==
Dream Out Loud's musical style is a mix of alternative rock, indie music, and hard rock. They cite as influences Steve Vai, Joe Satriani, Seal, Sting, and Chris Cornell.
