= Neal 'n' Nikki =

- Theatrical release poster
- Directed by: Arjun Sablok
- Written by: Arjun Sablok; Anvita Dutt Guptan
- Produced by: Aditya Chopra
- Starring: Uday Chopra; Tanishaa
- Cinematography: P. S. Vinod
- Edited by: Ritesh Soni
- Music by: Salim–Sulaiman
- Production company: Yash Raj Films
- Distributed by: Yash Raj Films
- Release date: 9 December 2005
- Running time: 123 minutes
- Country: India
- Language: Hindi
- Box office: ₹10.43 crore

Neal 'n' Nikki is a 2005 Indian Hindi-language romantic comedy film directed by Arjun Sablok and produced by Yash Chopra under the banner of Yash Raj Films. The film stars Uday Chopra and Tanishaa, with a special appearance by Abhishek Bachchan. Set primarily in British Columbia, Canada, the narrative follows Neal, a carefree Indo-Canadian man who agrees to meet potential brides at his parents' request but ends up entangled with the free-spirited Nikki during a series of comedic misadventures.

The film marked Sablok's second directorial venture with Yash Raj Films after Na Tum Jaano Na Hum (2002). Principal photography took place across various locations in Canada, including Vancouver and Whistler. The music was composed by Salim–Sulaiman, with lyrics by Anvita Dutt Guptan.

Released theatrically on 9 December 2005, Neal 'n' Nikki received overwhelmingly negative reviews from critics, who criticized its screenplay, humor, and excessive focus on skin-show, though some praised its production values and soundtrack. The film underperformed at the domestic box office but fared comparatively better in overseas markets due to its Westernized tone and diaspora appeal.

== Plot ==
Gurneal "Neal" Ahluwalia and Nikita "Nikki" Bakshi are two Indian Canadians raised in British Columbia. Despite their shared cultural background, they are polar opposites in personality. Prior to his arranged marriage, Neal decides to spend 21 days meeting 21 different women. During this time, he encounters Nikki at a nightclub, where she disrupts his date. After she becomes heavily intoxicated, Neal takes her to a hotel room where she falls asleep. The next morning, Nikki mistakenly believes that Neal assaulted her and begins to blackmail him, frequently interrupting his romantic pursuits.

As Neal continues his escapades, Nikki repeatedly interferes, including sabotaging a moment of intimacy with another woman. Eventually, Neal reveals his real reason for being in Canada—to explore his freedom before settling down—which angers Nikki. She invites Neal to Whistler under the pretense of introducing him to other women, but her true intention is to make her ex-boyfriend, Trish, jealous. Neal initially resists but later agrees to help. Their plan succeeds, but when Neal confesses his feelings, Nikki rejects him. Despite spending a night together camping, they are unable to openly admit their love.

Neal returns home for his engagement, only to discover that his fiancée, Sweety, is Nikki's cousin. As the ceremony begins, Nikki arrives to stop it, but it is revealed that Sweety has already committed to her true love, Happy Singh, through an online ceremony. Sweety elopes with Happy, and Neal proposes to Nikki, realizing that they are truly meant for each other.

== Cast ==
- Uday Chopra as Gurneal 'Neal' Ahluwalia
- Tanishaa as Nikita 'Nikki' Bakshi
- Richa Pallod as Satwinder 'Sweety' Kaur
- Gaurav Gera as Happy Singh
- Abhishek Bachchan as Raj Singh (special appearance)
- Kamini Khanna as Baldev
- Susheel Parashara as Gyaniji
- Sanaa Abdu Khazal as Katrina
- Kristy McQuade as Kristy
- Samantha McLeod as Chanel
- Alexandre Montez as Trish
- Serinda Swan as Amanda
- Simmy Cheema as Nikki's mother
- Pawan Chopra as Nikki's father
- Kanika Dang as Sweety's mother
- Michelle Wright as Police Officer
- Sahar Biniaz as Teacher

== Production ==
=== Development ===
Neal 'n' Nikki was developed as a contemporary romantic comedy directed by Canada-based filmmaker Arjun Sablok and produced by Aditya Chopra under Yash Raj Films. The screenplay and dialogues were written by Sablok in collaboration with Anvita Dutt Guptan. The film aimed to present a youthful pairing suited to its Westernized setting and tone.

=== Filming ===
Principal photography took place in British Columbia, Canada, including locations in Vancouver and Whistler. The Canadian backdrop was integral to the film's Indo-Canadian storyline.

== Soundtrack ==
Neal 'n' Nikki

Soundtrack album by Salim–Sulaiman
- Released: 2 November 2005
- Genre: Feature film soundtrack
- Label: YRF Music

Salim–Sulaiman chronology
Main Hoon Na (2004)	Neal 'n' Nikki (2005)	Vivah (2006)

The music was composed by Salim–Sulaiman. It consisted of 5 songs and 1 remix. The lyrics were penned by Anvita Dutt Guptan, Irshad Kamil, and Asif Ali Beg.

=== Track listing ===
No.	Title	Lyrics	Singer(s)	Length
1.	"Neal 'n' Nikki"	Anvita Dutt Guptan	KK, Shweta Pandit	5:16
2.	"Halla Re"	Irshad Kamil	Salim Merchant, Shweta Pandit	5:08
3.	"I'm In Love"	Anvita Dutt Guptan	Sonu Nigam, Clinton Cerejo, Mahalakshmi Iyer	5:24
4.	"Ankh Ladiye"	Anvita Dutt Guptan	Kunal Ganjawala, Javed Ali, Shweta Pandit	4:24
5.	"I Just Wanna Spend My Life With You"	Asif Ali Beg, Pike Winchurkar	Clinton Cerejo, Dominique Cerejo	5:25
6.	"Neal 'n' Nikki" (The Naughty Mix)	Anvita Dutt Guptan	KK, Shweta Pandit	5:06

== Reception ==
=== Box office ===
Neal 'n' Nikki underperformed at the domestic box office. According to Box Office India, the film had a budget of ₹7 crore and collected approximately ₹8.61 crore gross in India. Bollywood Hungama reported a net collection of ₹6.06 crore in India, with an overseas gross of ₹2.21 crore, bringing the worldwide total to ₹10.63 crore.

In the United States and Canada, the film earned $111,551, with an opening weekend gross of $75,005. Internationally, it grossed $207,309, leading to a worldwide total of $318,860.

Despite its modest overseas performance, the film was declared a flop due to its inability to recover its production costs.

=== Critical response ===
Neal 'n' Nikki received overwhelmingly negative reviews from critics upon its release, with criticism directed at its screenplay, excessive focus on skin exposure, and lack of emotional depth.

Taran Adarsh of IndiaFM rated the film 1 out of 5 stars, writing, "On the whole, Neal 'n' Nikki concentrates more on sex, skin show, sleaze, and vulgarity than a sound story. A terrible letdown in terms of content, the film has precious little to offer to moviegoers." Derek Elley of Variety described it as "a mismatched romantic comedy that makes most Bollywood twosomes look like art movies" and criticized it as "candy-floss entertainment" from an otherwise reliable production house.

Raja Sen of Rediff.com also gave the film a negative review, calling it a "mindless" product and writing, "If Neal 'n' Nikki is a hit, it'll just mean we can crank out mindless films where the leading actors aren't important at all. Which is a terrifying thought." Jaspreet Pandohar of BBC was more positive, giving the film 3 out of 5 stars. While acknowledging its "verging on vulgar" approach, she praised the lead pair's chemistry and wrote that the film "drags Bollywood's prudish attitudes kicking and screaming into the 21st century."

In a retrospective review, Tiasa Bhowal of India Today observed that the film, despite its initial appeal during promotion, was criticized for being "a sleazefest" and featuring "sexist dialogues." She concluded that the film's content would likely have received even harsher criticism if released in a later era.
