= Kavish Majumdar =

Indian actor

- Born: 18 July 1985 (age 41); Mumbai, Maharashtra, India
- Occupation: Actor
- Years active: 2001–2017

Kavish Majumdar (born 18 July 1985) is a former Indian actor who appeared in Hindi films.

== Career ==
Kavish Majumdar made his film debut with Kabhi Khushi Kabhie Gham (2001) as a child artiste. In the film, he played Laddoo, the younger version of Hrithik Roshan and Shah Rukh Khan's plump brother. While in college, he made short films and worked as an assistant director to Soham Shah for Luck (2009). He returned to acting with Gori Tere Pyaar Mein (2013) and later starred in Main Tera Hero (2014).

== Filmography ==
- All films are in Hindi.

Year	Film	Role	Notes
2001	Kabhi Khushi Kabhie Gham	Laddoo (younger Rohan Raichand)	
2007	Partner	Guy asking advice from Love Guru	Uncredited role
2009	Luck	—N/a	Assistant director
2013	Gori Tere Pyaar Mein	Latesh Bhai's son	
2014	Main Tera Hero	Seenu's college friend	
2017	Bank Chor	Mukesh	
