= Punit Malhotra =

Indian filmmaker (born 1982)

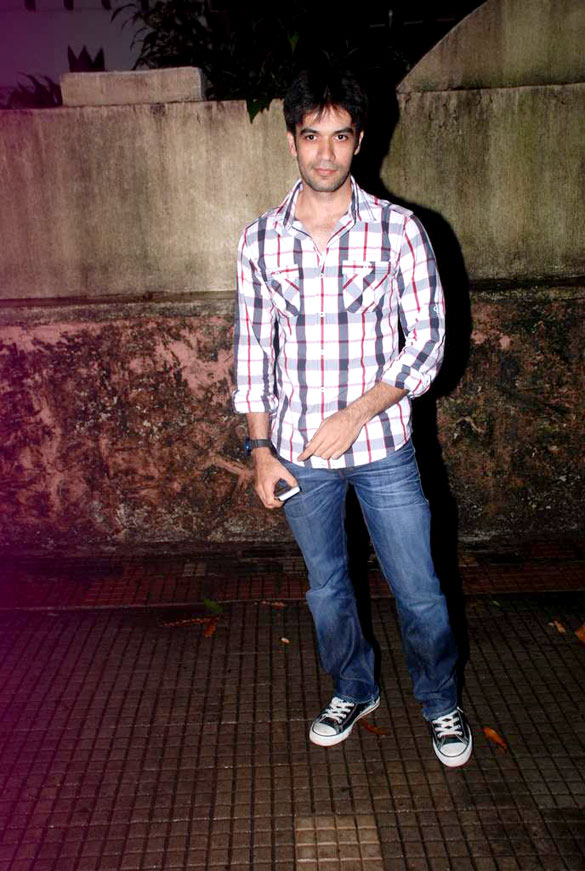
- Malhotra in 2012
- Born: 13 May 1982 (age 44); Mumbai, Maharashtra, India
- Occupations: Director, writer, ad filmmaker
- Years active: 2001–present
- Family: Suneel Darshan (maternal grandfather's first cousin); Dharmesh Darshan (maternal grandfather's first cousin); David Dhawan (father's first cousin); Varun Dhawan (cousin); Manish Malhotra (paternal uncle)

Punit Malhotra (born 13 May 1982) is an Indian film director who works in Hindi cinema. His first film, I Hate Luv Storys, released on 2 July 2010.

== Early life and family ==
Punit Malhotra was born on 13 May 1982, in Mumbai, Maharashtra, and brought up in its Bandra coastal suburb. His maternal grandfather Ram Dayal Sabarwal was a producer who launched Rekha. His first cousins are filmmakers Suneel and Dharmesh Darshan; well-known director David Dhawan is his father's first cousin; and the famous designer Manish Malhotra, who was also the costume designer for his first movie I Hate Luv Storys (2010), is his paternal uncle.

== Career ==
Malhotra worked as an assistant director on Karan Johar's Kabhi Khushi Kabhie Gham (2001), Hansal Mehta's Yeh Kya Ho Raha Hai? (2002), Nikhil Advani's Kal Ho Naa Ho (2003), Amol Palekar's Paheli (2005) and Tarun Mansukhani's Dostana (2008). Finally he made his debut as a director with I Hate Luv Storys (2010), which he also wrote.

Malhotra's second movie was Gori Tere Pyaar Mein, produced under Karan Johar's Dharma Productions, starring Kareena Kapoor and Imran Khan who were earlier paired in Ek Main Aur Ekk Tu.

In 2019 he directed the movie Student of the Year 2 starring Tiger Shroff, Tara Sutaria and Ananya Pandey

In 2020 he directed music videos "Unbelievable" and "Casanova", both featuring Tiger Shroff.

== Filmography ==
As director

Year	Film	Director	Writer	Notes
2010	I Hate Luv Storys	Yes	Yes	Directorial debut
2013	Gori Tere Pyaar Mein	Yes	Yes	
2019	Student of the Year 2	Yes	No	
