= Super flare =

Super flare may refer to:

- Superflare, an extremely large stellar flare on a solar-type star
- Solar flare generally, especially a large solar flare
  - Carrington Event, a geomagnetic storm associated with a large solar flare
  - March 1989 geomagnetic storm, a geomagnetic storm associated with a large solar flare
- Flare star, a variable star that can undergo unpredictable dramatic increases in brightness for a few minutes
