= Suraj Jagan =

Indian playback singer (born 1967)

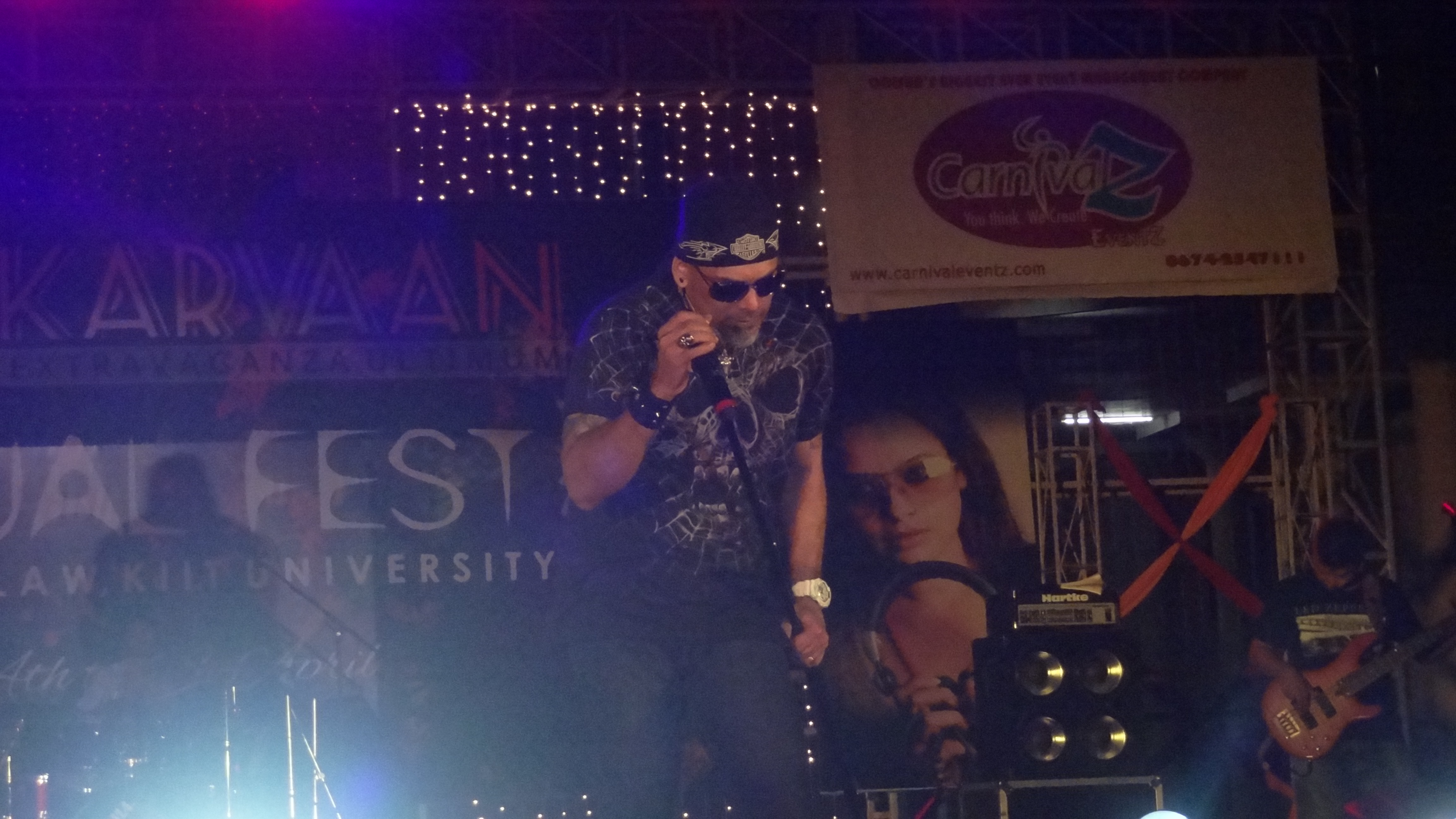
- Suraj Jagan performing live at KIIT Law School, Bhubaneswar

Background information
- Born: 11 May 1967 (age 59); India
- Genres: Playback singing, Indi-pop, Rock, Metal
- Occupations: Singer, actor, rockstar
- Years active: 1993–present

Suraj Jagan (born 11 May 1967) is an Indian playback singer, actor and rockstar. He is noted for the song Give Me Some Sunshine from the award-winning movie 3 Idiots. The song received the "Best Emerging Male Performer" award in the Max Stardust Award. Jagan's singing career began in 1990, and has included both solo work and as front man for the rock band Dream Out Loud. He has also worked in advertising jingle campaigns, Bollywood playback singing, acting in theatre productions and an acting role in the Bollywood film Rock On!! & "Hunterrr".

== Television and film work ==
Suraj Jagan began his career working in ad jingles, including the jingle You and I in this beautiful world for the award-winning "Hutch TVC" ad, before making his Bollywood debut with the song Hum Naujawan Hai from the movie Pyaar Mein Kabhi Kabhi in 1997. The song was given to him by fellow rock vocalist Vishal Dadlani, who was one of the music directors of the film.

From 2007 onwards his Bollywood playback songs included "Hey Jhonny" from Johnny Gaddaar, Dum Lagaa from Dil Dosti Etc and "No Big Deal" from Money Hai Toh Honey Hai. He has also sung the song Zehreelay from the movie Rock On!! where he actually performed the song in the movie. He played a part in composing the song and starred in a short cameo in the film with the role of 'Ajay'. The blog Aspi's Drift claimed at the time that Zehreelay was the first Death Metal song used in a Hindi film.

In 2009 he recorded the song "Give Me Some Sunshine" for the film 3 Idiots. The film's music director Shantanu Moitra composed the song with Suraj Jagan's voice in mind, and stated that if the movie's producers did not like Suraj Jagan's voice with the original composition, he would change the tune but would not compromise Suraj Jagan as the singer of the song. Jagan said that "I’ll always be grateful to him for that." Jagan did a guest appearance in the show The Suite Life of Karan & Kabir as Uncle Jojo.

His later playback singing work included Rang De from My Name Is Khan, Dil Dil Hai from 7 Khoon Maaf and Baby when you talk to me from Patiala House. His song Sadka Kiya with Mahalaxmi Iyer from the movie I Hate Luv Storys reached number one in the Indian music charts. He has said that it is his favourite song in Bollywood so far.

== Filmography ==
=== Hindi songs ===
- Chor (2024) : Blackout
- Adhoore (2024) : Woh Bhi Din The
- Hope Aur Hum (2018) : Hope Aur Hum
- Aag Hun Main (2016) : Kabali (METAL)
- Deewaren (2016) : "Deewaren: Unity Song by The Moody Nation"
- Ishq-E-Fillum (2015) : Shamitabh
- Kar Ja Re Ya Mar Ja Re Tu (2013) : ABCD: Any Body Can Dance
- Ganapati Bappa Morya (2013) : Iddarammayilatho (Telugu Film)
- Tu Hi Tu (2012) : Oh My God
- Man Hai Bheega (2012) : Black Home
- Vishwaroopam (2012) : Vishwaroopam (Tamil Film)
- Pyaar Ka Bukhaar (2012) : Challenge 2 (Bengali Film)
- Challenge Nibi Na Saala (2012) : Challenge 2 (Bengali Film)
- Pudikale Maamu (2012) : Neethaane En Ponvasantham (Tamil Film)
- Pankhida (2012) : Kevi Rite Jaish (Gujarati Film)
- Aafaton Ke Parinde (2012) : Ishaqzaade
- Dil Dhadkane Do (2011) : Zindagi Na Milegi Dobara
- Jaa Chudail (2011) : Delhi Belly
- Chhoo Lee (2011) : Mujhse Fraaandship Karoge
- Fareeda (2011) : Shaitan
- Karma Is A Bitch (2011) : Shor In The City
- Akkad Bakkad (2011) : Bhindi Baazaar Inc.
- Koi Aa Raha Hai Paas Hai (2011) : Pyaar Ka Punchnama
- Dil Dil Hai (2011) : 7 Khoon Maaf
- Baby When You Talk To Me (2011) : Patiala House
- Will You Marry Me (2010 ) : Turning 30
- I Am Doggone Crazy (2010) : Action Replayy
- Rang Daalein (2010) : Lafangey Parindey
- Sadka Kiya (2010) : I Hate Luv Storys
- Dil Khol Ke .. (2010) : We Are Family
- Tum Bhi Ho Wahi (2010) : Kites
- Karthik Calling Karthik – Theme Song (2010) : Karthik Calling Karthik
- Rang De (2010) : My Name Is Khan
- Maula (2010) : Hide & Seek
- Hide & Seek (2010) : Hide & Seek
- Give Me Some Sunshine (2009) : 3 Idiots
- Dil Kare (2009) : All the Best: Fun Begins
- Chatle Chalo (2009) : Toss
- Saanson Ka Rukna (2009) : Straight
- Humse Jo Churaiye Humko Hee (2009) : Straight
- Kya Hua Hoo Hoo (2009) : Straight
- Love Love Love (2009) : Straight
- Run Run Run (2009) : Straight
- Sooni Raah Pe (2009) : The Stoneman murders
- Zehereelay (2008) : Rock On!! (METAL)
- Theme Song Hijack (2008) : Hijack
- Missing Sunday (2008) : Sunday
- I Am A Bad Boy (2008) : Bhram
- Yeh Faasle (Remix) (2008) : Rama Rama Kya Hai Dramaaa
- No Big Deal (2008) : Money Hai Toh Honey Hai
- Zindagi (2007) : Brides Wanted (yet to be released)
- Hey Johnny (2007) : Johnny Gaddaar
- Dum Lagaa (2007) : Dil Dosti Etc
- Hum Naujawan Hai (1999) : Pyaar Mein Kabhi Kabhi

=== Telugu songs ===
- Hare Hare Rama (2009) : Maska
- Ganapathi Bappa (2013) : Iddarammayilatho
- Nachaledu Maava Pichi Pichi College (2012) : Yeto Vellipoyindhi Manasu
- Ko Antey Koti (2012) : Ko Antey Koti

== Discography ==
- Musafir (1999)

== Cover Track ==
- Pehla Nasha : (Pop)
- Churaliya Hai Tumne : (Pop)
- Mere Sapno Ki Rani : (Pop)
- Rang Barse : (Rock)
- Dum Maro Dum : (Rock)
- Gajab Ka Hai Din : (Hard Rock)
- Yahoo Chahe Koi Mujhe Junglee : (Hard Rock)
- Rafta Rafta Dekho Aankh Meri Ladi Hai : (Hard Rock)
- Aaja Aaja Mein Hu Pyar Tera : (Metal)

== Bands ==
- 2011 : Back To My Future
- 2007 – 2009 : Dream out Loud (DOL )
- 2006 : The Orchid Room Experiment
- 2003 : AFS
- 1997 – 1999 : Spyrals
- 1995 – 1997 : Chakraview
- 1993 – 1995 : Matchbox (HongKong )
- 1989 – 1993 : Krysys
