= Patiala House (film) =

2011 Indian film by Nikkhil Advani

- Theatrical release poster
- Directed by: Nikkhil Advani
- Written by: Story and Screenplay: Nikkhil Advani; Anvita Dutt Guptan; Dialogues: Anvita Dutt Guptan
- Produced by: Bhushan Kumar; Mukesh Talreja; Krishan Kumar; Twinkle Khanna; Zoeb Springwala
- Starring: Rishi Kapoor; Dimple Kapadia; Akshay Kumar; Anushka Sharma; Tinnu Anand
- Narrated by: Akshay Kumar
- Cinematography: Santosh Thundiyil
- Edited by: Manan Ajay Sagar
- Music by: Shankar–Ehsaan–Loy
- Production companies: T-Series Films; Hari Om Entertainment; People Tree Films
- Distributed by: Eros International
- Release dates: 10 February 2011 (Patiala); 11 February 2011 (India)
- Running time: 147 minutes
- Country: India
- Language: Hindi
- Budget: ₹26 crore (US$2.7 million)
- Box office: ₹35.3 crore (US$3.7 million)

Patiala House is a 2011 Indian Hindi-language sports drama film directed by Nikkhil Advani. The film stars Rishi Kapoor, Dimple Kapadia, Akshay Kumar, and Anushka Sharma in lead roles. It was produced by Bhushan Kumar, Mukesh Talreja, Krishan Kumar, and Twinkle Khanna under the banner of People Tree Films and Hari Om Entertainment. The film was released on 11 February 2011. The theatrical trailer of the film was premiered with Farah Khan's Tees Maar Khan on 24 December 2010. Akshay's role as a fast bowler is loosely based on cricketer Monty Panesar. The film's idea was conceived by publicity designer Rahul Nanda, son of writer Gulshan Nanda. It is the only movie which was featured with the collaborating cast of Akshay Kumar and Anushka Sharma together as a main lead.

ASHOL, an Indian software developer, also released a cricket mobile video game based on the film.

== Plot ==
The story revolves around Parghat Singh Kahlon, alias Gattu / Kaali, who is living the life his father Gurtej Singh Kahlon chose for him. Gattu had been good at cricket and wanted to play for England, though Gurtej would never let him become a member of the England team. Gurtej had threatened him earlier with suicide. His siblings hated him as he was an exemplary child in the house. He was alone without many friends until Zeeshan and his foster-sister, Simran, came into his life. Simran was Gattu's childhood friend, but the two had not met in years.

In the present day, Parghat gets another chance to fulfill his dream, and his siblings and Simran convince him to give it a shot. If he gets on the team, they hope Gurtej might be able to realize that the world isn't as racist as it used to be. As he gets on the team, they hide the fact that Gattu is on the team, but Gurtej eventually finds out. Seeing his son on a team he despises gives him a heart attack, and he ends up in the emergency room. Gattu plays cricket anyway for his siblings. He is deeply hurt to be disgraced by his father, but he also loves cricket and hopes to change his father.

The people of Southall all come together and try to convince Gurtej that it is okay to be a cricket player for England. He locks himself inside the house, where his wife tells him that she has never acted as a mother, only as a wife, and often forgot she was both. She turns on the TV, wanting to see her son fulfill his dream. Gattu, who is being interviewed by Sanjay Manjrekar, lies to him that his father is proud of him. Gurtej watches with her and realizes how badly he has treated his son. The family comes back into the house, and Gurtej requests for one of them to drive him to the stadium. Gattu is playing poorly because he is upset that Gurtej disgraced him. Only at the last ball of the game, Gattu manages to get Andrew Symonds out for England by using the bowling style of former Indian cricketer Lala Amarnath. Gurtej apologizes to him, and they make up. Gattu's siblings are now able to follow their dreams thanks to Gattu.

== Cast ==
- Rishi Kapoor as Gurtej Singh Kahlon
  - Kumud Mishra as young Gurtej (voice dubbed by Kapoor)
- Dimple Kapadia as Guneet Kaur Kahlon
  - Masha Pour as young Guneet
- Akshay Kumar as Parghat "Gattu" Singh Kahlon a.k.a. "Kaali", a fast bowler (loosely based on Monty Panesar)
  - Usman Qureshi as teenage Gattu
  - Virej Dasani as child Gattu
- Anushka Sharma as Simran Chaggal, Gattu's friend/love interest, Zeeshan's guardian
- Devansh Daswani as Zeeshan Chaggal, Simran's ward
- Kamaal Rashid Khan as an interviewer for Khalsa TV
- Soni Razdan as Dimple
- Neelu Kohli as Harleen
- Hard Kaur as Komal Chatwal
- Tinu Anand as Vishal Bedi, Selector #1
- Simi Melwani as Ashpreet Kaur
- Prem Chopra as Virendra Singh Saini (cameo appearance)
- Maya Sarao as Manmeet Kaur
- Rabbit Sack C as Aman Singh Kahlon
- Arman Kirmani as Jaskaran "Jassi" Singh Kahlon

== Release ==
The film's premiere was held in Patiala on 10 February 2011.

== Reception ==
=== Critical reception ===
Rajeev Masand of CNN IBN gave the film 1.5/5 stars, arguing that Patiala House was "lacking subtleties and nuances" that could have made it truly heartfelt. Sonia Chopra of Sify awarded th film 3/5 stars and described it as "predictable". Anupama Chopra of NDTV gave it 3.5/5 stars, describing it as the "best work director Advani and actor Kumar have done in recent years" and argued that the film "never soars but it is a notch better than the mediocre fare that we see every week."

Countering these, more positive reviews came from other sources. Aniruddha Guha from Daily News and Analysis and Sukanya Verma from Rediff Movies each awarded it 3 stars out of five, with Verma acknowledging Kumar's role: "Patiala House rests on Kumar's restraint and valiant performance". Smriti Sharma of India Today gave it 3.5/5 stars, describing it as an emotional journey, and Taran Adarsh of Bollywood Hungama awarded the film four stars, concluding that the "hallmark" of the film was the "merging of its engaging drama with cricket" and describing it as a "compelling watch".

== Soundtrack ==
Patiala House

Soundtrack album by Shankar–Ehsaan–Loy
- Released: 7 January 2011 (Audio CD); 8 January 2011 (Audio Cassette); 9 January 2011 (Digital Streaming Media)
- Genre: Feature film soundtrack
- Length: 40 minutes
- Label: T-Series

Shankar–Ehsaan–Loy chronology
We Are Family (2010)	Patiala House (2011)	West Is West (2011)

The music of the film was composed by Shankar–Ehsaan–Loy. Lyrics were penned by Anvita Dutt Guptan.

Track listing
No.	Title	Artist(s)	Length
1.	"Laung Da Lashkara"	Jasbir Jassi, Mahalakshmi Iyer, Hard Kaur	5:07
2.	"Kyun Main Jagoon"	Shafqat Amanat Ali	5:45
3.	"Rola Pe Gaya"	Shankar Mahadevan, Mahalakshmi Iyer, Hard Kaur, Earl, Master Saleem	4:31
4.	"Aadat Hai Woh"	Vishal Dadlani	4:21
5.	"Baby When You Talk To Me"	Suraj Jagan, Alyssa Mendonsa	4:28
6.	"Tumba Tumba"	Hans Raj Hans	3:01
7.	"Aval Allah"	Richa Sharma	2:30
8.	"Kyun Main Jaagoon" (Unplugged)	Shafqat Amanat Ali	4:11
9.	"Kyun Main Jagoon" (Remix)	Shafqat Amanat Ali	2:27
10.	"Role Pe Gaya" (Remix)	Shankar Mahadevan, Mahalakshmi Iyer, Hard Kaur, Earl, Master Saleem	2:48
11.	"Baby When You Talk To Me" (Remix)	Suraj Jagan, Alyssa Mendonsa	2:07
12.	"Laung Da Lashkara" (Remix)	Jasbir Jassi, Mahalakshmi Iyer, Hard Kaur	2:51

=== Reviews ===
Professional ratings
Review scores
Source	Rating
Bollywood Hungama	4/5 stars
Rediff.com	3.5/5 stars

The album received positive reviews upon release. Joginder Tuteja of Bollywood Hungama gave the soundtrack 4 out of 5 stars, saying "Patiala House delivers more than what one expected from the album.[..]it is obvious that listeners could well be picking up the first popular album of the new decade in the millennium." Rediff in a 3.5 star review said: "Akshay Kumar-Anushka Sharma starrer Patiala House is S-E-L's first release of the year, and it's good news for everyone concerned. You won't feel cheated for having brought an original copy of this CD."
