= Gori Tere Pyaar Mein =

2013 Indian film by Punit Malhotra

- Theatrical release poster
- Directed by: Punit Malhotra
- Screenplay by: Arshad Sayed; Punit Malhotra
- Story by: Arshad Sayed; Punit Malhotra
- Produced by: Karan Johar
- Starring: Imran Khan; Kareena Kapoor Khan
- Cinematography: Mahesh Limaye
- Edited by: Akiv Ali
- Music by: Songs: Vishal–Shekhar; Score: Salim–Sulaiman
- Production company: Dharma Productions
- Distributed by: AA Films (India); Reliance Entertainment (Overseas)
- Release date: 22 November 2013
- Running time: 150 minutes
- Country: India
- Language: Hindi
- Budget: ₹30 crore
- Box office: est. ₹20.80 crore

Gori Tere Pyaar Mein (transl. Girl... in your love) is a 2013 Indian Hindi-language romantic comedy film written and directed by Punit Malhotra. Produced by Karan Johar under the banner of Dharma Productions, the film stars Imran Khan and Kareena Kapoor Khan.

== Plot ==
Sriram (Imran Khan) lives with his family in Bangalore. Sriram is a cool guy who loves himself and has just returned from studying architecture in the United States. Sriram is brought the marriage proposal of Vasudha (Shraddha Kapoor). Sriram accepts the marriage proposal but Vasudha is reluctant to marry Sriram as she loves a Punjabi boy, Kamal, hailing from Chandigarh who has no job and is a social worker. Sriram takes Vasudha to a restaurant and narrates his story about when he was in love with Dia Sharma (Kareena Kapoor Khan), also a social worker. Sriram meets Dia in Delhi when he comes with his girlfriend Jyoshna to attend her brother's wedding. To clear the traffic on the road, Dia uses Sriram's jacket to make her stomach appear pregnant.

Sriram meets Dia again after 6 months at a mall opening in Bangalore. Dia sends all the children inside the mall to play as there was no place for the kids to play. Sriram gets impressed by Dia and they start dating. On one such date, Dia takes Sriram to a place where she wants to build an orphanage. While on the other side, Sriram is sad as his dad is not buying him an Audi. There are many builders behind that property. One late evening Sriram calls Dia outside her hotel. Dia learns that Sriram has bought the property to his father and in return he has got an Audi. Dia has an argument with Sriram because the land he has brought for his dad is the land Dia had chosen for building an orphanage. She soon breaks up with him after a relationship of more than 1 year.

At Sriram's wedding Vasudha makes him realise that he still loves Dia and won't be able to handle their wedding. Sriram runs away from his wedding to Dia's house in Delhi. There he finds out that Dia is living in a village in Gujarat, Jhumli. Sriram reaches the village and promises Dia that he won't leave the village until Dia comes with him back home. Dia still angry with Sriram tells him that if he could build a bridge in the village she will come back with him and forgive him. The village head Latesh bhai, (Anupam Kher) is hesitant to build a bridge worth crores. Latesh takes tax from the villagers, enjoying his money, doing nothing for the villagers, much in contrast to his father.

Sriram and Dia approach Kirtibhai a local politician who agrees to invest for the bridge. The works starts but not for long as a few days after Kirtibhai is found corrupt. Sriram then makes a deal with Latesh to sell the 10 acre barren land of Jhumli, which Dia never wanted to, in turn for completing the bridge. Sriram agrees with the fact that Dia would be angry at his move. The bridge building starts. After some days the head comes and tells he is going to start to build the chemical factory soon.

Dia was shocked for she always anticipated the head would do something like that once he got the land. Dia angry with Sriram yells at him, telling him that he committed the same mistake yet again and tells him to leave Jhumli. But this time Sriram too gets angry with her for making such a statement after he has done this far and leaves the village. But he comes back, determined to complete his task, the bridge work. He requests Latesh bhai to stop building the factory for the sake of the villagers. In turn he gets badly beaten by Latesh bhai's men.

Then Latesh's father silent all over the years gives latesh the piece of land which latesh was asking for so many years, which makes Sriram look like a hero in front of everyone including his son . The head realising his mistake, stops further commencement on building the factory and permits Sriram to complete the bridge. Dia gets to know all about this. She forgives Sriram for all his earlier misdeeds and they finally reunite on the newly built bridge.

The film ends with Dia going back with Sriram to the city but she asks him if they could stay in the nearby village as there is some electricity problem. Sriram, on hearing this, starts running away as Dia laughs.

== Cast ==
- Imran Khan as Sriram Venkat
- Kareena Kapoor Khan as Dia Sharma
- Shraddha Kapoor as Vasudha Natarajan (extended cameo appearance)
- Anupam Kher as Collector Lateshbhai Dhaneshbhai Shah
- Nizhalgal Ravi as Venkat, Sriram's father
- Esha Gupta as Nisha, Sriram's best friend
- Sujatha Kumar as Sriram's mother
- Kalyani Natarajan as Sriram's sister-in-law
- Kavish Majumdar as Bhavtesh Shah, Latesh Bhai's son
- Vineet Kumar Singh as villager
- Shilpa Sapatnekar as Dancer in "Tooh"

== Production ==
=== Development & casting ===
The movie was announced in 2011, and then delayed due to casting issues. Initially it was to star Shahid Kapoor and Sonam Kapoor. Shahid Kapoor had issues with the script and Sonam Kapoor left the project as she didn't want the public to think she was cast due to her relationship with the director. Kareena Kapoor Khan and Imran Khan were then signed as the lead actors and Shraddha Kapoor joined the cast for a friendly appearance. Earlier, actress Nargis Fakhri had been signed on for a supporting role but due to shooting conflicts, Esha Gupta was cast as a replacement.

=== Filming ===
Principal photography began on 27 February 2013 in Bangalore, India.

== Soundtrack ==
Gori Tere Pyaar Mein

Soundtrack album by Vishal–Shekhar
- Released: 1 November 2013
- Recorded: 2012–2013
- Genre: Soundtrack
- Length: 36:58
- Language: Hindi
- Label: Sony Music • Dharma Productions
- Producers: Vishal–Shekhar, Sony Music India

Vishal–Shekhar chronology
Chennai Express (2013)	Gori Tere Pyaar Mein (2013)	Hasee Toh Phasee (2014)

Singles from Gori Tere Pyaar Mein
- 1. "Tooh" Released: 12 October 2013; 2. "Chingam Chabake" Released: 19 October 2013; 3. "Dhat Teri Ki" Released: 26 October 2013

The songs for the film were composed by Vishal–Shekhar who also worked on Malhotra's last release, I Hate Luv Storys. There will be nine songs in the album. Among these, a wedding song titled "Tooh" sung by Mika Singh, Mamta Sharma & Shruti Pathak was released on 10 October. A large scale village song titled "Chingam chabake" performed by Shankar Mahadevan & Shalmali Kholgade was released on 17 October. On 24 October, another song titled "Dhat Teri Ki" featuring Aditi Singh Sharma & Sanam Puri was released. A romantic ballad sung by Neeti Mohan & Kamal Khan titled "Naina" was released on 31 October. Eventually, on 1 November 2013, the entire album was released digitally.

Track listing
No.	Title	Singer(s)	Length
1.	"Tooh"	Mamta Sharma, Mika Singh & Shruti Pathak	4:20
2.	"Chingam Chabake"	Shankar Mahadevan & Shalmali Kholgade	4:01
3.	"Dhat Teri Ki"	Sanam Puri & Aditi Singh Sharma	4:06
4.	"Naina"	Neeti Mohan & Kamal Khan	5:18
5.	"Dil Duffer"	Shruti Pathak & Nitesh Kadam	4:09
6.	"Moto Ghotalo"	Sukhwinder Singh & Sanah Moidutty	4:23
7.	"Dhat Teri Ki (Remix by DJ Rishabh)"	Sanam Puri, Aditi Singh Sharma	3:54
8.	"Chingam Chabake (Remix by DJ Kiran Kamath)"	Shankar Mahadevan, Shalmali Kholgade	3:40
9.	"Gori Tere Pyaar Mein (Mashup by DJ Kiran Kamath)"	Shankar Mahadevan, Shalmali Kholgade, Nitesh Kadam, Shruti Pathak, Sukhwinder Singh, Sanah Moidutty, Mika Singh, Mamta Sharma, Kamal Khan, Neeti Mohan (Remixed by DJ Kiran Kamath)	3:07
Total length:			36:58

== Reception ==
=== Box office ===
According to Box Office India, it opened with collections of ₹25 million on its first day and had an opening weekend total of ₹87.5 million. The film's final domestic total to approximately ₹140 million.

=== Critical reception ===
Anupama Chopra of Hindustan Times remarked, the film "is fun as long as it sticks to the formula" and calls the story "melodramatic and even more synthetic as Punit tries to inject emotion and a sense of nobility that hasn’t been earned". Variety's David Chute called the film "a moderately well-executed romantic slapstick comedy, supposedly based on the actual experiences of its co-writer and director, Punit Malhotra".
