= Shruti Pathak =

Indian playback singer and lyricist

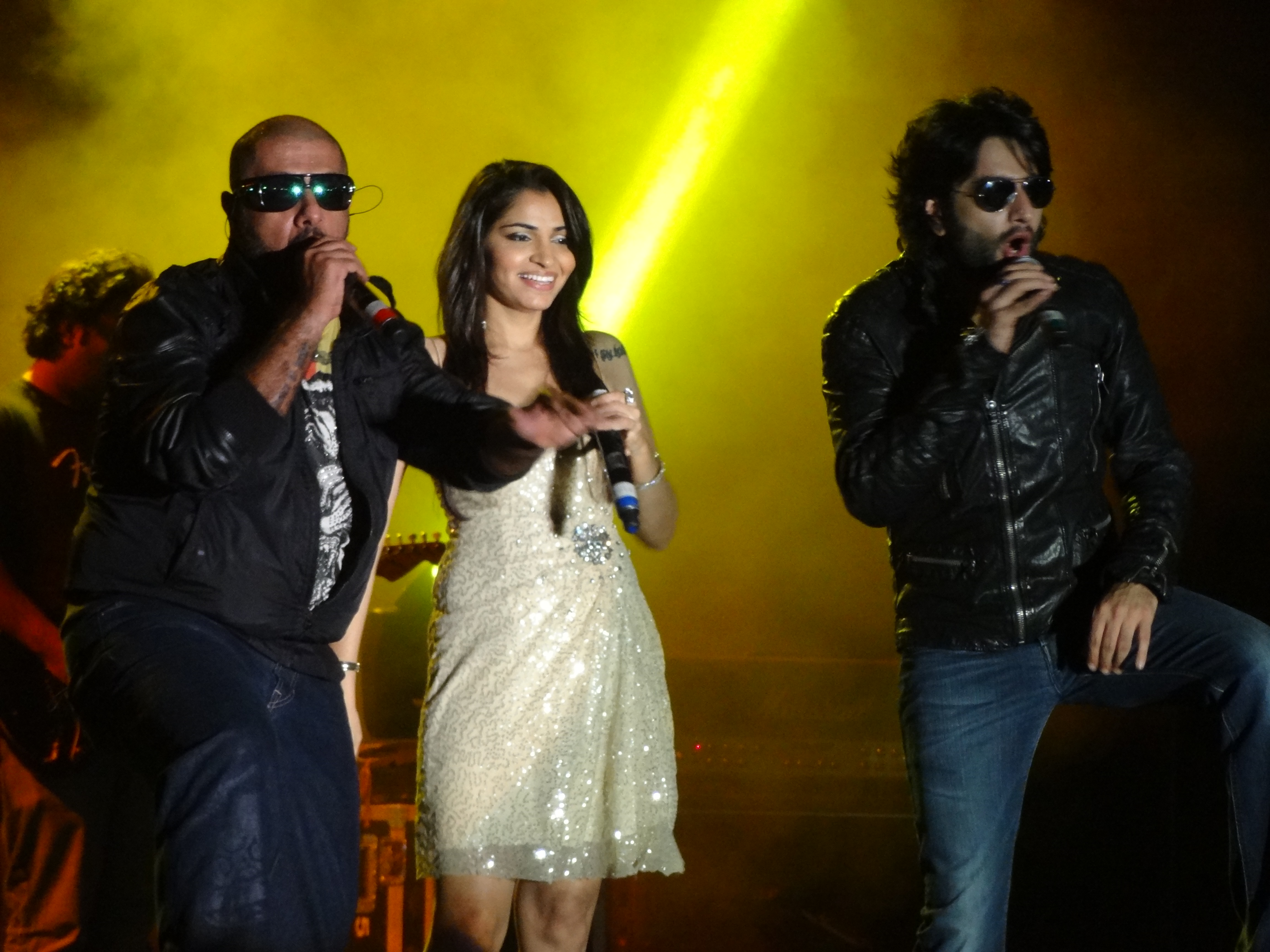
- Shruti with Vishal & Shekhar performing live in Flare 2012 at Pandit Deendayal Petroleum University, Gandhinagar
- Born: Ahmedabad, Gujarat, India
- Occupations: Singer; lyricist
- Years active: 2004–present

Shruti Pathak is an Indian playback singer and lyricist working in Hindi film industry.

== Early life ==
She is a Gujarati, and was born and brought up in Ahmedabad, she moved to Mumbai to pursue singing as a career after finishing her master's degree in Psychology.

== Career ==
Pathak began her singing career after singing for various remix albums. Her "Leke Pehla Pehla Pyaar" for the Baby Doll series in 2004. With her song "Mar Jawa" from Fashion (2008) Pathak became popular. She earned nominations in both Filmfare and Screen Awards for the song. She is also the lyricist along with being singer of the song "Payaliya" from Dev.D (2009). In 2013 she wrote one more song "Shubhaaramabh" for Amit Trivedi in Kai Po Che.

She has also done many stage shows. She has performed at the Culrav 2012 Cultural fest of Motilal Nehru National Institute of Technology Allahabad, the Flare (Techno-Cultural Fest) of Pandit Deendayal Petroleum University, Gandhinagar, the Protsahan 13 Cultural, Sports and Technical Festival of SVKM's NMIMS University Shirpur Campus Dhule on 1 April 2013, the Udaan 2014 Cultural Fest of SPIT College, Mumbai organized by Rockfree Entertainment on 22 February 2014, and the Silver Jublee event of Lata Mangeshkar Hospital, Nagpur on 22 December 2015.

Pathak has also appeared all three seasons of Coke Studio India. She sang 'Kya Haal Sunawan' in season 1, 'Glorious' and 'Shedding Skin' in season 2 and 'Haal Ve Rabba' in season 3. She appeared on MTV Unplugged season 4 with Sachin - Jigar. She also on the Dewarists.

She learned classical from her guru Shree Divyang Thakkar from very young age.

== Discography ==
Year	Film	Song	Co-singer(s)	Notes
2026	Pidha Pachhi	"Radha Aavo To Ramiye Raas"	Umesh Barot	Gujarati film
2025	Tu Meri Main Tera Main Tera Tu Meri	"Hum Dono"	Shekhar Ravjiani, Vishal Dadlani	
2025	Umbarro	"Umbarro Title Song"	Mehul Surti	Gujarati film
2022	Nayika Devi: The Warrior Queen	"Patan Na Patrani"	Vandana Gadhvi	Gujarati film
2019	Hellaro	" Haiyaa "	Aditya Gadhavi Mehul Surti	Gujarati Film
2018	Baaghi 2	"Soniye Dil Nayi"	Ankit Tiwari	
2017	Chor Bani Thangaat Kare	"Chor Bani Thangaat Kare (Title Track)"	Divya Kumar	Gujarati film
2014	Happy Ending	"Haseena Tu Kameena Mein"	Siddharth Basrur, Rahul Pandey	
2013	Gori Tere Pyaar Mein	"Tooh"	Mika Singh, Mamta Sharma, Vishal Dadlani	
2013	Gori Tere Pyaar Mein	"Dil Duffer"	Nitesh Kadam	
2013	Kai Po Che	"Shubhaarambh"	Divya Kumar	
2011	Players	"Buddhi Do Bhagwaan"	Abhishek Bachchan	
2011	Ra.One	"Criminal"	Akon, Vishal Dadlani	
2011	Love Breakups Zindagi	"Chhayee Hai Tanhayee"	Shafqat Amanat Ali, Salim Merchant	
2010	Anjaana Anjaani	"Tujhe Bhula Diya"	Mohit Chauhan, Shekhar Ravjiani	
2010	Anjaana Anjaani	"Aas Pass Khuda"	Rahat Fateh Ali Khan	
2010	Admissions Open	"Roshni"		
2009	Luck	"Jee Le"	Naresh Kamath	
2009	Kurbaan	"Rasiya"		
2009	Dev.D	"Paayaliya"		
2008	Fashion	"Mar Jawaan"	Salim Merchant	Nominated, Filmfare Best Female Playback Award; Nominated, Screen Award for Best Female Playback
2008	Money Hai Toh Honey Hai	"Awaara Dil"		
2008	Bujjigaadu: Made in Chennai	"Sudu Sude"	Sandeep Chowta	Telugu film
2008	Bujjigaadu: Made in Chennai	"Guchchi Guchchi"	Sandeep Chowta	Telugu film
