= Flare (Techno-Cultural Fest) =

Flare is the annual socio-cultural festival of the Pandit Deendayal Petroleum University. It is a four-day festival at PDPU featuring music and dance. It is held in April every year. It was started in 2010 and since then has attendance of over 9,000 students from various colleges of India.

== Pro-nites ==
In its first year, there were performances by the Pakistani band Jal and several other bands like Antariksh based on popular band Pink Floyd. In its second year, Flare hosted performances by Agnee, Highway 61, and Jaipur Beats along with DJ Suketu.

== Cultural events ==
- Ablaze- National-level group dance competition
- AtMoshSphere- Battle of bands
- Amethyst- National-level model hunt
- Melodia- Music competition
- Emotions- Drama competition
- Zest- Solo and duet dance competition
- Kavyanjali- Poetry competition
- Literature events
- Cooking events
- Fine arts events
- Flea market
- Guest lectures
- Special performances
- Informals
