= Anvita Dutt =

Indian musician, writer, and director (born 1972)

- Born: 20 February 1972 (age 54); New Delhi, India
- Occupations: Dialogue writer; Lyricist; Screenwriter; Story writer; Director
- Years active: 2005–present

Anvita Dutt (born 20 February 1972) is an Indian dialogue writer, screenplay writer, story writer, lyricist and director of Bollywood films.

== Early life and background ==
Her father worked with the Indian Air Force (IAF), thus she grew up in several military cantonments across India, including Hindon, Guwahati, Jodhpur and Saharanpur.

== Career ==
She worked in advertising for 14 years, before she was introduced to Aditya Chopra by Rekha Nigam, who is dialogue writer of Parineeta and Laaga Chunari Mein Daag, thus starting her film career as a lyricist and screenwriter with Yash Raj Films. She then worked with Dharma Productions as a lyricist and dialogue writer. Followed by Nadiadwala Grandson Films as a dialogue writer on one project. And as a dialogue writer and lyricist on the second project.

She has also worked with Nikhil Advani as a dialogue writer and lyricist. She then went back to working again with YRF but under their banner of Y films for two films. After a hiatus she worked with Phantom films. She is currently directing films for Clean Slate Filmz. Her first film Bulbbul has been released as a Netflix Original on 24 June 2020 and met with positive views from both the audience and critics regarding its stand on feminism, visual effects, background music and performance of lead actress Tripti Dimri. Bulbbul is set in a backdrop of 1880s Bengal presidency and revolves around a child-bride plus her journey from innocence to strength.

Her second directorial venture, Qala, starring Tripti Dimri. It is a period drama set in the 1930s and ’40s was released on 1 December 2022. written and directed by her, this movie shows the ugly side of ambition and an abusive childhood.

== Filmography ==
Year	Film	Writer	Director	Notes
2005	Neal 'n' Nikki	Yes	No	
2008	Bachna Ae Haseeno	Dialogues	No	
2008	Ru Ba Ru	Yes	No	
2008	Dostana	Dialogues	No	
2009	Kambakkht Ishq	Yes	No	
2010	Housefull	Dialogues	No	
2011	Patiala House	Yes	No	
2011	Mujhse Fraaandship Karoge	Yes	No	
2013	Queen	Dialogues	No	
2015	Shaandaar	Yes	No	
2016	Baar Baar Dekho	Dialogues	No	
2017	Phillauri	Yes	No	
2020	Bulbbul	Yes	Yes	Netflix Original
2022	Qala	Yes	Yes	Netflix Original

=== Lyricist ===
Denotes films that have not yet been released

Year	Movie name	Songs	Composers	Contribution
2005	Neal 'N' Nikki	"Neal 'n' Nikki"	Salim–Sulaiman	Dialogue, Lyrics
2005	Neal 'N' Nikki	"I'm In Love"	Salim–Sulaiman	Dialogue, Lyrics
2005	Neal 'N' Nikki	"Aankh Ladiye"	Salim–Sulaiman	Dialogue, Lyrics
2005	Neal 'N' Nikki	"Neal 'n' Nikki - The Naughty Mix"	Salim–Sulaiman	Dialogue, Lyrics
2008	Tashan	"Chhaliya"	Vishal–Shekhar	
2008	Bachna Ae Haseeno	All Songs	Vishal–Shekhar	Dialogue, Lyrics
2008	Dostana	"Jaane Kyun"	Vishal–Shekhar	Dialogue, Lyrics
2008	Dostana	"Shut Up & Bounce"	Vishal–Shekhar	Dialogue, Lyrics
2008	Dostana	"Khabar Nahin"	Vishal–Shekhar	Dialogue, Lyrics
2009	Luck	"Jee Le"	Salim–Sulaiman	Lyrics
2009	Kambakkht Ishq	All Songs except "Om Mangalamn"	Anu Malik	Dialogue, Lyrics
2009	Aladin	"Bachke O Bachke"	Vishal–Shekhar	Lyrics
2010	Badmaash Company	All Songs	Pritam	Lyrics
2010	I Hate Luv Storys	"Sadka Kiya"	Vishal–Shekhar	Lyrics
2010	We Are Family	"Dil Khol Ke Let's Rock"	Shankar–Ehsaan–Loy	Lyrics
2010	Anjaana Anjaani	"Tumse Hi Tumse" Along with Amitabh Bhattacharya, Caralisa Monteiro	Vishal–Shekhar	Lyrics
2010	Tees Maar Khan	"Wallah Re Wallah"	Vishal–Shekhar	Lyrics
2010	Tees Maar Khan	"Badey Dilwala"	Vishal–Shekhar	Lyrics
2010	Tees Maar Khan	"Happy Ending"	Vishal–Shekhar	Lyrics
2010	Tees Maar Khan	"Wallah Re Wallah - Remix"	Vishal–Shekhar	Lyrics
2010	Tees Maar Khan	"Badey Dilwala - Remix"	Vishal–Shekhar	Lyrics
2011	Patiala House	All Songs	Shankar–Ehsaan–Loy	Dialogue, Lyrics
2011	Mujhse Fraaandship Karoge	All Songs except "Har Saans Main"	Raghu Dixit	Dialogue, Lyrics
2011	Ra.one	"Right By Your Side"	Vishal–Shekhar	Lyrics
2012	Student of the Year	All Songs	Vishal–Shekhar	Lyrics
2012	Ek Tha Tiger	''Lapaata''	Sohail Sen, Sajid–Wajid	Lyrics
2012	Shanghai	''Imported Kamariya''	Vishal-Shekhar	Lyrics co-written with Vishal Dadlani
2013	Gippi	"Baby Doll"	Vishal-Shekhar	Lyrics
2013	Gippi	"Dil Kaagzi"	Vishal-Shekhar	Lyrics
2013	Gippi	"Mann Baavra"	Vishal-Shekhar	Lyrics
2013	Gori Tere Pyaar Mein	"Chingam Chabake"	Vishal-Shekhar	Lyrics
2013	Gori Tere Pyaar Mein	"Tooh"	Vishal-Shekhar	Lyrics
2013	Gori Tere Pyaar Mein	"Moto Ghotalo"	Vishal-Shekhar	Lyrics
2014	Queen	All Songs except "Ranjha", "Hungama Ho Gaya" (Remix)	Amit Trivedi	Dialogue, Lyrics
2014	Bang Bang!	"Meherbaan"	Vishal–Shekhar	Lyrics
2014	Bang Bang!	"Uff"	Vishal–Shekhar	Lyrics
2014	Bang Bang!	"Meherbaan (Reprise version)"	Vishal–Shekhar	Lyrics
2015	Shaandaar	"Gulaabo"	Amit Trivedi	Screenplay, Dialogues, Lyrics
2017	Phillauri	"Dum Dum"	Shashwat Sachdev	Screenplay, Lyrics
2017	Phillauri	"Sahiba"	Shashwat Sachdev	Screenplay, Lyrics
2017	Phillauri	"Naughty Billo"	Shashwat Sachdev	Screenplay, Lyrics
2017	Phillauri	"Bajaake Tumba"	Shashwat Sachdev	Screenplay, Lyrics
2017	Phillauri	"Dum Dum (Reprise)"	Shashwat Sachdev	Screenplay, Lyrics
2018	Kaalakaandi	"Jive With Me"	Sameer Uddin	Lyrics
2018	Kaalakaandi	"Aa Bhi Jaa"	Sameer Uddin	Lyrics
2018	Kaalakaandi	"Kaalakaandi"	Shashwat Sachdev	Lyrics
2018	Veere Di Wedding	"Veere"	Vishal Mishra	Lyrics
2018	Veere Di Wedding	"Dagmag Dagmag"	Vishal Mishra	Lyrics
2018	Zee Music Originals	"Betuki Si"	Jeet Gannguli	Lyrics
2019	Junglee	"Fakeera Ghar Aaja"	Sameer Uddin	Lyrics
2019	Student of the Year 2	"Main Bhi Nahin Soya"	Vishal–Shekhar	Lyrics
2019	Student of the Year 2	"The Jawaani Song"	Vishal–Shekhar	Lyrics
2019	Student of the Year 2	"Fakira"	Vishal–Shekhar	Lyrics
2019	Student of the Year 2	"Jat Ludhiyane Da"	Vishal–Shekhar	Lyrics
2022	Badhaai Do	"Gol Gappa"	Amit Trivedi	Lyricist
2025	Tu Meri Main Tera Main Tera Tu Meri	"Tu Meri Main Tera Main Tera Tu Meri"	Vishal–Shekhar	Lyricist
2025	Tu Meri Main Tera Main Tera Tu Meri	"Hum Dono"	Vishal–Shekhar	Lyricist
2026	Alpha	TBA	Rohansh & Abeer	Lyricist

== Awards and nominations ==
Year	Category	Nominated work	Result	Ref(s)
Mirchi Music Awards
2012	Album of The Year	Student of the Year	Nominated	
2012	Listeners' Choice Album of the Year	Student of the Year	Won	
2014	Album of The Year	Queen	Nominated	
2017	Lyricist of The Year	"Sahiba" - Phillauri	Nominated	
