= I Hate Luv Storys =

2010 Indian film by Punit Malhotra

- Theatrical release poster
- Directed by: Punit Malhotra
- Written by: Punit Malhotra
- Produced by: Hiroo Yash Johar; Karan Johar; Ronnie Screwvala
- Starring: Imran Khan; Sonam Kapoor
- Cinematography: Ayananka Bose
- Edited by: Akiv Ali
- Music by: Songs: Vishal–Shekhar; Background Score: Salim–Sulaiman
- Production companies: UTV Motion Pictures; Dharma Productions
- Distributed by: UTV Motion Pictures
- Release date: 2 July 2010 (India)
- Running time: 135 minutes
- Country: India
- Language: Hindi
- Box office: ₹72.52 crore

I Hate Luv Storys is a 2010 Indian Hindi-language romantic comedy film written and directed by Punit Malhotra and jointly produced by Hiroo Yash Johar and Karan Johar under Dharma Productions and Ronnie Screwvala under UTV Motion Pictures, the latter also serving as distributor, in their first collaboration. The film stars Imran Khan and Sonam Kapoor. It was shot in Mumbai and Queenstown, New Zealand. The film's soundtrack was composed by Vishal–Shekhar with lyrics penned by Anvita Dutt Guptan, Kumaar and Vishal Dadlani himself.

I Hate Luv Storys was released on 2 July 2010 and went on to become a box office hit, grossing ₹72 crore worldwide. It received mixed-to-positive reviews from critics, with praise for its novel concept, music, cinematography, humor, costumes and the leads' performances, but criticism for its screenplay and pacing. At the 56th Filmfare Awards, I Hate Luv Storys received 4 nominations – Best Music Director (Vishal–Shekhar), Best Lyricist (Vishal for "Bin Tere"), Best Male Playback Singer (Shafqat Amanat Ali for "Bin Tere") and Best Female Playback Singer (Shreya Ghoshal for "Bahara").

A promotional mobile video game based on the film and developed by UTV Indiagames was also released in 2010.

== Plot ==
Simran loves Bollywood romances so much so that her life has begun to resemble one. With her awesome job as an art director in films and a "Mr. Perfect" fiancé, Raj, she lives a dreamy life. But then comes Jay, who brings a fresh joy into her life. Jay is an assistant to Veer Kapoor, a director who is famous for his love stories, but Jay himself is repulsed to romances and is a firm disbeliever of love, which has also caused Veer to lash out at him many times. He initially chides Simran for her obsession with romance, and Simran too has a bad impression of him, but soon after, the two become friends while working on Veer's next film, titled Pyaar Pyaar Pyaar.

Simran's close bond with Jay brings problems in her love life. She slowly begins to feel that Raj is not right for her, and falls in love with Jay, dreaming of spending her entire life with him. She decides to confess her feelings to him, but after doing so, Jay explains that he never thought of her that way — they were only best friends. Heartbroken, Simran leaves and does not speak to Jay. She prepones her trip to Queenstown, New Zealand for a Pyaar Pyaar Pyaar schedule Veer has planned there.

Jay finds that her absence in his life upsets him and realizes that he has fallen in love with her. Later, he joins the shoot in Queenstown, where Raj also arrives. Shortly after the film wraps up, he plans a romantic dinner acting on Veer's suggestion, asking Simran to meet him. He admits that he loves her but this time, she rejects him, as she does not want to hurt Raj's feelings after giving him another chance. A heartbroken Jay tries to accept the fact that he has lost Simran to Raj. However, Jay's friends and his mother, whose ugly divorce with her husband was what led her son to loathe romance, persuade him to not give up on Simran. Jay tries to make Simran jealous but soon realizes when Raj announces his intentions to propose to her that manipulating her feelings will hurt her even more.

Meanwhile, Raj proposes to Simran, and she accepts. But Simran realizes she doesn't love Raj, and tells him so. She goes to the Pyaar Pyaar Pyaar premiere, where she hopes to meet Jay. On the other hand, Jay is leaving, as he has given up all hopes of being with Simran. At the airport, he talks to his mother and she again asks him not to give up. Encouraged, Jay runs back to the premiere. He finds Simran outside the hall and the two express their love for each other and hug, finally getting their happy ending.

== Cast ==
- Imran Khan as Jay 'J' Dhingra
- Sonam Kapoor as Simran Saluja
- Samir Soni as Veer Kapoor
- Sammir Dattani as Raj Dholakia
- Aamir Ali as Rajiv / Rahul
- Pooja Ghai Rawal as Priya / Sanjana
- Kavin Dave as Kunal
- Bruna Abdullah as Giselle
- Ketki Dave as Mrs. Saluja, Simran's mother
- Anju Mahendru as Mrs. Dhingra, Jay's mother
- Aseem Tiwari as Nikhil
- Shireesh Sharma as Mr. Saluja, Simran's father
- Khushboo Shroff as Nidhi
- Avantika Malik Khan in a special appearance
- Himarsha Venkatsamy in a special appearance

== Production ==
The title I Hate Luv Storys is an intentional misspelling of the sentence "I Hate Love Stories", and was chosen for numerological reasons.

== Soundtrack ==
I Hate Luv Storys

Soundtrack album by Vishal–Shekhar
- Released: 25 May 2010
- Genre: Feature film soundtrack
- Length: 38:48
- Label: Sony Music
- Producer: Karan Johar

Vishal–Shekhar chronology
Aladin (2009)	I Hate Luv Storys (2010)	Anjaana Anjaani (2010)

The soundtrack of I Hate Luv Storys is composed by Vishal–Shekhar. The film has 5 original songs followed by 3 remixes. The soundtrack was released on 25 May 2010. It received a favorable review from Parimal M. Rohit of Buzzine Bollywood, with the author saying, "the soundtrack is phenomenally and breathtakingly romantic. The smooth beats and hypnotic vocals are second to none, and very few soundtracks are as complete as this one." Ehsaan Noorani of Shankar–Ehsaan–Loy trio has provided one of the best guitar arrangements for the soundtrack. A part of the song "Bahara" was used in Bulgarian pop-folk singer Tedi Aleksandrova's song "Dai Mi Svoboda".

=== Track list ===
Track	Song	Singers	Lyrics	Duration
01	"Jab Mila Tu"	Vishal Dadlani	Anvita Dutt Guptan	4:11
02	"Bin Tere"	Shafqat Amanat Ali, Sunidhi Chauhan	Vishal Dadlani	5:30
03	"I Hate Luv Storys"	Vishal Dadlani	Kumaar	4:45
04	"Sadka Kiya"	Suraj Jagan, Mahalakshmi Iyer	Anvita Dutt Guptan	5:43
05	"Bahara"	Shreya Ghoshal, Sona Mohapatra	Kumaar	5:25
06	"Bin Tere" (Reprise)	Shekhar Ravjiani	Vishal Dadlani	3:40
07	"Bahara" (Chill Version)	Rahat Fateh Ali Khan	Kumaar	4:04
08	"Bin Tere" (Remix by DJ Kiran Kamath)	Shafqat Amanat Ali, Sunidhi Chauhan	Vishal Dadlani	5:28

== Reception ==
=== Critical response ===
Sukanya Verma of Rediff praised the lead performances and rated the movie 3.5/5 saying, "It's Sonam and Imran's collective persona and their free-flowing chemistry that makes all the difference. Although the pair deserve better than an amateurishly written romance to scoop out their terrific potential as a combination". Gaurav Malani of IndiaTimes rated the movie 3/5 and said, "If you hate love stories this one's certainly not for you. Which means this ends up being another love story and that too a dull one!" Nikhat Kazmi of Times of India also praised the lead performances, but found the plot predictable and rated the movie 3/5 saying, "Thematically, I Hate Luv Storys is extremely simplistic, uni-layered and terribly predictable."

Rahul Nanda of Filmfare rated it 3/5 and said, "The film never equals the sum of all its part, but it's impossible to deny the energy with which it keeps the plot ticking on." Taran Adarsh of Bollywood Hungama gave it 3.5/5 saying, "On the whole, I Hate Luv Storys is a young and vibrant love story with tremendous appeal for the yuppies. The fresh pairing and the on-screen electrifying chemistry, the lilting musical score and the magical moments in the film should attract its target audience." Subhash K. Jha was not impressed, calling it "a disappointment." The Hindu in its review said " After trying to be versatile, Imran has returned to familiar romantic terrain. His Jay is only a couple of streets away from the Jai he played in Jaane Tu… Ya Jaane Naa (2008). He has mastered four-five expressions which establish his uber-cool credentials quite well...Sonam's face lights up the proceedings every time the mind says, “Enough!” If there is something called intelligent innocence, she has it, but it is waiting to be explored."

== Box office ==
I Hate Luv Storys had a strong opening in multiplexes and a good opening in single screens. It collected Rs. 66.0 crore and was declared a hit at the box office.

== Awards and nominations ==
2011 Star Screen Awards:

- Won – Best Female Playback Singer – Shreya Ghoshal for "Bahara"
- Nominated – Best Actor (Popular Choice) – Imran Khan

56th Filmfare Awards:

- Nominated – Best Music Director – Vishal–Shekhar
- Nominated – Best Lyricist – Vishal Dadlani for "Bin Tere"
- Nominated – Best Male Playback Singer – Shafqat Amanat Ali for "Bin Tere"
- Nominated – Best Female Playback Singer – Shreya Ghoshal for "Bahara"

6th Apsara Film & Television Producers Guild Awards:

- Nominated – Best Music Director – Vishal–Shekhar

2011 Zee Cine Awards:

- Nominated – Most Promising Director – Punit Malhotra
- Nominated – Best Track of the Year – "Bin Tere"
- Nominated – Best Male Playback Singer – Shafqat Amanat Ali for "Bin Tere"
