= List of songs recorded by Shilpa Rao =

This is a list of songs recorded by Indian female singer Shilpa Rao.

== Hindi film songs ==
=== 2005 ===
| Film | Song | Composer(s) | Writer(s) | Co-singer(s) |
|---|---|---|---|---|
| Ek Ajnabee | "Strange On The Prowl" | Amar Mohile | Sameer | |

=== 2007 ===
| Film | Song | Composer(s) | Writer(s) | Co-singer(s) |
|---|---|---|---|---|
| Aggar | "Sehra" | Mithoon | Sayeed Quadri | Roop Kumar Rathod |
| Anwar | "Javeda Zindagi (Tose Naina Laage)" | Mithoon | Hasan Kamal | Kshitij Tarey |
| Gandhi My Father | "Faith" | Piyush Kanojia | N/A | Ghulam Qadir Khan, Sanjeev Abhyankar |
| Gandhi My Father | "Gandhi's Favourite" | Piyush Kanojia | N/A | |
| High School Musical 2 (Dubbed version) | "All For One" | Shankar–Ehsaan–Loy | Sameer | Earl Edgar D, Raja Hasan, Tarannum Malik, Arijit Singh |
| High School Musical 2 (Dubbed version) | "All For One (Dj Suketu Mix)" (Arranged by Aks) | Shankar–Ehsaan–Loy | Sameer | Earl Edgar D, Raja Hasan, Tarannum Malik, Arijit Singh |
| Panga Naa Lo | "Uff Ui Ma" | Rahul Ranade | Amole Gupte | Amitabh Gokhale, June Banerjee |
| Salaam-e-Ishq: A Tribute to Love | "Saiyaan Re" | Shankar–Ehsaan–Loy | Sameer | Shankar Mahadevan, Loy Mendonsa |
| The Train | "Woh Ajnabee" | Mithoon | Sayeed Quadri | Mithoon |
| The Train | "Woh Ajnabee" (Club Mix Version) | Mithoon | Sayeed Quadri | Mithoon |
| The Train | "Teri Tamanna" | Mithoon | Sayeed Quadri | KK, Zubeen Garg |
| The Train | "Teri Tamanna" (Euro Mix Version) | Mithoon | Sayeed Quadri | KK, Zubeen Garg |
| The Train | "Teri Tamanna" (Club Mix Version) | Mithoon | Sayeed Quadri | KK, Zubeen Garg |

=== 2008 ===
| Film | Song | Composer(s) | Writer(s) | Co-singer(s) |
|---|---|---|---|---|
| Aamir | "Ek Lau" | Amit Trivedi | Amitabh Bhattacharya | Amitabh Bhattacharya |
| Bachna Ae Haseeno | "Khuda Jaane" | Vishal–Shekhar | Anvita Dutt Guptan | KK |
| Bachna Ae Haseeno | "Khuda Jaane (Remix Version)" | Vishal–Shekhar | Anvita Dutt Guptan | KK |
| Contract | "Maula Khair Kare" | Amar Mohile | Mehboob Kotwal | Sukhwinder Singh |
| Good Luck! | "Main Sajda" (Version 1) | Anu Malik | Sameer | Sukhwinder Singh |
| Good Luck! | "Main Sajda" (Version 2) | Anu Malik | Sameer | Sukhwinder Singh |
| Hijack | "Koi Na Jaane" | Justin-Uday | Kumaar | KK |
| One Two Three | "Gup Chup (Remix)" | Raghav Sachar | Aditya Dhar, Munna Dhiman | Raghav Sachar |

=== 2009 ===
| Film | Song | Composer(s) | Writer(s) | Co-singer(s) |
|---|---|---|---|---|
| Aagey Se Right | "Mahiya" | Amartya Rahut | Hitesh Kewalya | Clinton Cerejo |
| Dev.D | "Dhol Yaara Dhol" | Amit Trivedi | Shellee | Kshitij Tarey |
| Dev.D | "Ranjhana" | Amit Trivedi | Shellee | Kshitij Tarey |
| Gulaal | "Aisi Sazaa" | Piyush Mishra | Piyush Mishra | |
| Horn 'Ok' Pleassss | "Oya Oya" | Lalit Pandit | Farhaad, Salim Bijnori | KK |
| Paa | "Mudhi Mudhi Ittefaq Se" | Ilaiyaraaja | Swanand Kirkire | |
| Paa | "Udhi Udhi Ittefaq Se" | Ilaiyaraaja | Swanand Kirkire | |
| Sikandar | "Manzaraat" | Justin-Uday | Kumaar | |

=== 2010 ===
| Film | Song | Composer(s) | Writer(s) | Co-singer(s) |
|---|---|---|---|---|
| Admissions Open | "Aasman Ke Paar" | Amit Trivedi | Shellee | Raman Mahadevan, Joi Barua, Tochi Raina, Amitabh Bhattacharya |
| Admissions Open | "Aasman Ke Paar" (Club Version) | Amit Trivedi | Shellee | Raman Mahadevan, Joi Barua, Tochi Raina, Amitabh Bhattacharya |
| Anjaana Anjaani | "Anjaana Anjaani" | Vishal–Shekhar | Irshad Kamil | Vishal Dadlani |
| Anjaana Anjaani | "I Feel Good" | Vishal–Shekhar | Vishal Dadlani | Vishal Dadlani |
| Apartment | "Ankhiya Na Maar" | Bappi Lahiri | Syed Gulrez | |
| Apartment | "Ankhiya Na Maar" (Remix Version) | Bappi Lahiri | Syed Gulrez | |
| Lafangey Parindey | "Nain Parindey" | R. Anandh | Swanand Kirkire | |
| Lahore | "O Re Bande" | Piyush Mishra | Piyush Mishra | Rahat Fateh Ali Khan |
| Lahore | "Rang De" | M.M. Kreem | Junaid Wasi | Shankar Mahadevan |
| Mallika | "Ittefaq Tu Nahin" (Rock Version) | Pritam | Sudhakar Sharma | Raaj Gopal Iyer |
| Mallika | "Ittefaq Tu Nahin" (Sensuos Version) | Pritam | Sudhakar Sharma | Raaj Gopal Iyer |
| Mumbai Mast Kallander | "Mumbai Mast Kallander" | Afsar, Sajid Khan | Panchhi Jalonvi | Neuman Pinto, Earl Edgar D'Souza |
| Mumbai Mast Kallander | "Mumbai Mast Kallander" (Remix Version) | Afsar, Sajid Khan | Panchhi Jalonvi | Neuman Pinto, Earl Edgar D'Souza |
| Swaha | "Habibi" | Praveen Bharadwaj | Praveen Bharadwaj | Rikkee |
| Toh Baat Pakki! | "Dil Le Jaa" | Pritam | Shabbir Ahmed | Jasbir Jassi, Javed Ali |
| Toh Baat Pakki! | "Dil Le Jaa" (Remix Version) | Pritam | Shabbir Ahmed | Jasbir Jassi, Javed Ali |

=== 2011 ===
| Film | Song | Composer(s) | Writer(s) | Co-singer(s) |
|---|---|---|---|---|
| Desi Boyz | "Allah Maaf Kare" | Pritam | Irshad Kamil | Sonu Nigam |
| Desi Boyz | "Allah Maaf Kare (Remix)" | Pritam | Irshad Kamil | Sonu Nigam |
| Ladies vs Ricky Bahl | "Jazba" | Salim–Sulaiman | Amitabh Bhattacharya | |
| Memories in March | "Dawat" (Female Version) | Debojyoti Mishra | Rituparno Ghosh | |
| Mujhse Fraaandship Karoge | "Uh-Oh Uh-Oh" | Raghu Dixit | Anvita Dutt Guptan | Ash King |
| Mujhse Fraaandship Karoge | "Uh-Oh Uh-Oh 2.0" | Raghu Dixit | Anvita Dutt Guptan | Ash King |
| No One Killed Jessica | "Yeh Pal" | Amit Trivedi | Amitabh Bhattacharya | |
| Pappu Can't Dance Saala | "Jadoo" | Malhar | Amitabh Bhattacharya, Saurabh Shukla | |
| Pappu Can't Dance Saala | "Lamha" | Malhar | Amitabh Bhattacharya, Saurabh Shukla | |
| That Girl in Yellow Boots | "Ladkhadaaya" | Naren Chandavarkar, Benedict Taylor | Varun Grover | |
| U R My Jaan | "U R My Jaan" | Sanjeev Darshan | Sameer | Sanjeev Rathod |
| Yeh Saali Zindagi | "Dil Dar-Ba-Dar" | Nishat Khan | Swanand Kirkire | Javed Ali |
| Yeh Saali Zindagi | "Ishq Tere Jalwe" | Nishat Khan | Swanand Kirkire | Javed Ali |
| Yeh Saali Zindagi | "Yeh Saali Zindagi" (Duet Version) | Nishat Khan | Swanand Kirkire | Sunidhi Chauhan, Kunal Ganjawala |
| Yeh Saali Zindagi | "Yeh Saali Zindagi" (Female Version) | Nishat Khan | Swanand Kirkire | Sunidhi Chauhan |

=== 2012 ===
| Film | Song | Composer(s) | Writer(s) | Co-singer(s) |
|---|---|---|---|---|
| Cocktail | "Yaariyaan" | Pritam | Irshad Kamil | Mohan Kanan |
| English Vinglish | "English Vinglish" (Female Version) | Amit Trivedi | Swanand Kirkire | |
| English Vinglish | "Gustakh Dil" | Amit Trivedi | Swanand Kirkire | |
| Ek Main Aur Ekk Tu | "Aahatein" | Amit Trivedi | Amitabh Bhattacharya | Karthik |
| Ek Main Aur Ekk Tu | "Aahatein" (Remix Version) | Amit Trivedi | Amitabh Bhattacharya | Shekhar Ravjiani |
| Ek Main Aur Ekk Tu | "Gubbare" | Amit Trivedi | Amitabh Bhattacharya | Amit Trivedi, Nikhil D'Souza |
| Ek Main Aur Ekk Tu | "Kar Chalna Shuru Tu" | Amit Trivedi | Amitabh Bhattacharya | Vishal Dadlani |
| Jab Tak Hai Jaan | "Ishq Shava" | A. R. Rahman | Gulzar | Raghav Mathur |
| Jodi Breakers | "Jab Main Tumhare Saath Hun" | Salim–Sulaiman | Irshad Kamil | Benny Dayal, Salim Merchant |
| Love Possible | "Jagi Jagi Si Ankhoon Mein" | Afsar-Sajid | Atique Allahabadi | Javed Ali, Priyani Vani |

=== 2013 ===
| Film | Song | Composer(s) | Writer(s) | Co-singer(s) | Ref. |
|---|---|---|---|---|---|
| 3G | "Khalbali" | Mithoon | Shellee | Tochi Raina, Arijit Singh | |
| B.A. Pass | "Shabh Gaya Hai" | Alokananda Dasgupta | Rajeshwari Dasgupta | | |
| Bombay Talkies | "Apna Bombay Talkies" | Amit Trivedi | Swanand Kirkire | Udit Narayan, Alka Yagnik, Kumar Sanu, Abhijeet, S. P. Balasubrahmanyam, Kavita Krishnamurthy, Sudesh Bhonsle, Shreya Ghoshal, Shaan, Sunidhi Chauhan, Sukhwinder Singh, KK, Mohit Chauhan, Sonu Nigam | |
| Dhoom 3 | "Malang" | Pritam | Sameer | Siddharth Mahadevan | |
| Four Two Ka One | "Ishq Di Battiyan" | Avishek Majumder | Parvez Khan | Mika Singh | |
| Four Two Ka One | "Sundri" | Avishek Majumder | Parvez Khan | Kunal Ganjawala | |
| Four Two Ka One | "Sundri" (Remix Version) | Avishek Majumder | Parvez Khan | Kunal Ganjawala | |
| Lootera | "Manmarziyan" | Amit Trivedi | Amitabh Bhattacharya | Amitabh Bhattacharya, Amit Trivedi | |
| Yeh Jawaani Hai Deewani | "Subhanallah" | Pritam | Amitabh Bhattacharya | Sreeram Chandra | |

=== 2014 ===
| Film | Song | Composer(s) | Writer(s) | Co-singer(s) | Ref. |
|---|---|---|---|---|---|
| Gulaab Gang | "Gulaabi" | Soumik Sen | Neha Saraf | Malabika Brahma | |
| Bang Bang! | "Meherbaan" | Vishal–Shekhar | Anvita Dutt Guptan, Kumaar | Ash King, Shekhar Ravjiani | |
| Bhopal: A Prayer for Rain | "Abr e Karam" | Shilpa Rao | Dhruv Sangari (Bilal Chishty Sangari) | | |
| Ugly | "Papa" | G. V. Prakash Kumar | Gaurav Solanki | | |

=== 2015 ===
| Film | Song | Composer(s) | Writer(s) | Co-singer(s) |
|---|---|---|---|---|
| Badmashiyaan | "Thode Se Hum" | Bobby–Imran | Shabbir Ahmed | |
| Chehere: A Modern Day Classic | "Jo Ab Ja Chuke" | Jaideep Chaudury | Sayeed Quadri | Mahalakshmi Iyer, Shaan |
| Chehere: A Modern Day Classic | "Kabhi Khud Se Kam" | Jaideep Chaudury | Sayeed Quadri | Mahalakshmi Iyer, Sunidhi Chauhan |
| Kaun Kitne Paani Mein | "Ho Naa" | Subhi, Style Bhai | Subhi | |
| NH10 | "Le Chal Mujhe" (Reprise) | Sanjeev–Darshan | Bann Chakraborty | |

=== 2016 ===
| Film | Song | Composer(s) | Writer(s) | Co-singer(s) |
|---|---|---|---|---|
| Ae Dil Hai Mushkil | "Bulleya" | Pritam | Amitabh Bhattacharya | Amit Mishra |
| Ae Dil Hai Mushkil | "Aaj Jaane Ki Zid Na Karo" | Pritam | Amitabh Bhattacharya | |
| Ae Dil Hai Mushkil | "Bulleya" (Reprise) | Pritam | Amitabh Bhattacharya | Arijit Singh |

=== 2017 ===
| Film | Song | Composer(s) | Writer(s) | Co-artist(s) |
|---|---|---|---|---|
| Jeena Isi Ka Naam Hai | "Qubool Hai" | Visshoo Mukherjee | Asish Pandit | Ash King |

=== 2018 ===
| Film | Song | Composer(s) | Writer(s) | Co-singer(s) |
|---|---|---|---|---|
| Hichki | "Phir Kya Hai Gham" | Jasleen Royal | Aditya Sharma, Neeraj Rajawat | |
| Jalebi | "Mujhme" | Samuel-Akanksha | Arafat Mehmood | |
| Jalebi | "Tum Se Adlib"(Female) | Samuel-Akanksha | Manoj Kumarnath | |
| Helicopter Eela | "Chand Lamhe" | Daniel B. George | Aasma | |

=== 2019 ===
| Film | Song | Composer(s) | Writer(s) | Co-singer(s) |
|---|---|---|---|---|
| Kalank | "Kalank Title Track"(Duet) | Pritam | Amitabh Bhattacharya | Arijit Singh |
| Kalank | "Kalank Title Track"(Bonus) | Pritam | Amitabh Bhattacharya | Arijit Singh |
| Mission Mangal | "Shaabaashiyaan" | Amit Trivedi | Amitabh Bhattacharya | Anand Bhaskar, Abhijeet Srivastava |
| On The Ramp Never Ending Show | O Piya.. Preet Mein Tori | Raaj Aashoo | Seema Saini | Raja Hassan |
| War | "Ghungroo" | Vishal–Shekhar | Kumaar | Arijit Singh |

=== 2020 ===
| Film | Song | Composer(s) | Writer(s) | Co-singer(s) |
|---|---|---|---|---|
| Love Aaj Kal | "Haan Tum Ho" | Pritam | Irshad Kamil | Arijit Singh |
| Ludo | "Hardum Humdum" (Female Version | Pritam | Sayeed Quadri, Shloke lal | |
| Raat Akeli Hai | "Aadhe Aadhe Se" | Pritam | Sneha Khanwalkar | Raj Shekhar, Mika Singh |

=== 2021 ===
| Film | Song | Composer(s) | Writer(s) | Co-singer(s) |
|---|---|---|---|---|
| Mimi | "Phuljhadiyon" | A. R. Rahman | Amitabh Bhattacharya | |
| Tadap | "Tere Siva Jag Mein" | Pritam | Irshad Kamil | Darshan Raval |

=== 2022 ===
| Film | Song | Composer(s) | Writer(s) | Co-singer(s) |
|---|---|---|---|---|
| Jalsa | "Thehar"(Female) | Gaurav Chatterji | Sandeep Gaur | |
| Laal Singh Chaddha | "Tere Hawale" | Pritam | Amitabh Bhattacharya | Arijit Singh |
| Laal Singh Chaddha | "Tere Hawale"(Reprise) | Pritam | Amitabh Bhattacharya | Tushar Joshi |
| Mister Mummy | "Chupke Chupke" | Rochak Kohli | Kumaar | Armaan Malik |
| Mister Mummy | "Chupke Chupke (Film Version)" | Rochak Kohli | Kumaar | Armaan Malik |

=== 2023 ===
| Film | Song | Composer(s) | Writer(s) | Co-singer(s) | Notes |
|---|---|---|---|---|---|
| Pathaan | "Besharam Rang" | Vishal–Shekhar | Kumaar, Vishal Dadlani | Caralisa Monteiro, Vishal Dadlani, Shekhar Ravjiani | |
| Ponniyin Selvan: II | "Ruaa Ruaa" | A. R. Rahman | Gulzar | | Dubbed version |
| Zara Hatke Zara Bachke | "Sanjha" | Sachin-Jigar | Amitabh Bhattacharya | Sachet Tandon | |
| Zara Hatke Zara Bachke | "Sanjha Chill Flip" | Sachin-Jigar | Amitabh Bhattacharya | Sachet Tandon | |
| Zara Hatke Zara Bachke | "Sanjha Lofi Beat" | Sachin-Jigar | Amitabh Bhattacharya | Sachet Tandon | |
| Rocky Aur Rani Kii Prem Kahaani | "Ro Lain De" | Pritam | Amitabh Bhattacharya | Sonu Nigam | |
| Rocky Aur Rani Kii Prem Kahaani | "Ro Lain De Chillhop" | Pritam | Amitabh Bhattacharya | Sonu Nigam | |
| Jawan | "Chaleya" | Anirudh Ravichander | Kumaar | Arijit Singh | |
| Jawan | "Not Ramaiya Vastavaiya" | Anirudh Ravichander | Kumaar | Vishal Dadlani, Anirudh Ravichander | |
| Ganapath | "Hum Aaye Hain" (Version 2) | White Noise Studios | Priya Saraiya | Mika Singh | |
| Pippa | "Jazbaat" | A. R. Rahman | Shellee | Jubin Nautiyal | |
| Safed | "Rang Rasiya" | Mahima Bharadwaj | Shashi Suman | | |

=== 2024 ===
| Film | Song | Composer(s) | Writer(s) | Co-singer(s) | Notes |
|---|---|---|---|---|---|
| Merry Christmas | "Raat Akeli Thi" | Pritam | Varun Grover | Tushar Joshi | |
| Fighter | "Sher Khul Gaye" | Vishal–Shekhar | Kumaar | Benny Dayal | |
| Fighter | "Ishq Jaisa Kuch" | Vishal–Shekhar | Kumaar | Vishal Dadlani | |
| Fighter | "Dil Chah Raha" | Vishal–Shekhar | Kumaar | Vishal Mishra | |
| Crakk | "Jeena Haraam" | Tanishk Bagchi | Tanishk Bagchi | Vishal Mishra | |
| Murder Mubarak | "Bhola Bhala Baby" | Sachin–Jigar | Priya Saraiya | Sachin–Jigar | |
| Stree 2 | "Tumhare Hi Rahenge Hum" | Sachin–Jigar | Amitabh Bhattacharya | Varun Jain | |
| Vicky Vidya Ka Woh Wala Video | "Mere Mehboob" | Sachin–Jigar | Priya Saraiya | Sachet Tandon | |
| Do Patti | "Akhiyaan De Kol" | Tanishk Bagchi | Kausar Munir, Mellow D | Mellow D | |
| Devara: Part 1 | "Dheere Dheere" | Anirudh Ravichander | Kausar Munir | | Hindi version |
| Kanguva | "Yolo" | Devi Sri Prasad | Mellow D | | Hindi version |

=== 2025 ===
| Film | Song | Composer(s) | Writer(s) | Co-singer(s) | Notes |
|---|---|---|---|---|---|
| Jewel Thief | "Jewel Thief - Title Track" | Soundtrek–Anis Ali Sabri | Soundtrek-Anis Ali Sabri | Raghav Chaitanya | Netflix film |
| Jewel Thief | "Ilzaam" | Soundtrek–Anis Ali Sabri | Kumaar | Vishal Mishra | Netflix film |
| Jewel Thief | "Lootera" | Sachin-Jigar | Kumaar | Neuman Pinto | Netflix film |
| Metro... In Dino | "Yaad (Encore)" | Pritam | Momin Khan Momin, Sandeep Shrivastava | B Praak | Side B |
| Metro... In Dino | "Hote Tak (Reprise)" | Pritam | Ghalib, Sandeep Shrivastava | Raghav Chaitanya | Side B |
| Metro... In Dino | "Qaide Se (Reprise)" | Pritam | Amitabh Bhattacharya | Solo | Side B |
| Saiyaara | "Barbaad (Reprise - Female)" | The Rish | The Rish | Solo | |
| Baaghi 4 | "Yeh Mera Husn" | Tanishk Bagchi | Sameer Anjaan | Solo | |
| Abir Gulaal | "Khudaya Ishq" | Amit Trivedi | Kumaar | Arijit Singh | |
| Ek Chatur Naar | "Gulabi Saawariya" | Abhijeet Srivastava | Shayra Apoorva | Sachet Tandon | |
| The Ba***ds of Bollywood | "Ghafoor" | Shashwat Sachdev | Shashwat Sachdev | Ujwal Gupta | Netflix series |
| The Ba***ds of Bollywood | "Sajna Tu Beiman" | Shashwat Sachdev | Shashwat Sachdev | B Praak, Shashwat Sachdev | Netflix series |
| Tere Ishk Mein | "Tere Zikr Mein" | A. R. Rahman | Irshad Kamil | Solo | |
| Tere Ishk Mein | "Jigar Thanda (Female)" | A. R. Rahman | Irshad Kamil | Solo | |
| Gustaakh Ishq | "Ul Jalool Ishq" | Vishal Bhardwaj | Gulzar | Papon | |

== Telugu film songs ==
| Year | Film | Song | Composer(s) | Writer(s) | Co-singer(s) | Notes |
|---|---|---|---|---|---|---|
| 2009 | Konchem Ishtam Konchem Kashtam | "Abacha" | Shankar–Ehsaan–Loy | Chandrabose | Mahalakshmi Iyer | |
| 2009 | Konchem Ishtam Konchem Kashtam | "Egire Egire" | Shankar–Ehsaan–Loy | Chandrabose | Clinton Cerejo, Hemachandra, Raman Mahadevan | |
| 2012 | English Vinglish | "English Vinglish" (Female) | Amit Trivedi | Krishna Chaitanya | | Dubbed version |
| 2012 | English Vinglish | "Idho Vidham" | Amit Trivedi | Krishna Chaitanya | | Dubbed version |
| 2013 | Dhoom 3 | "Tarang" | Pritam | Bhaskarabhatla | Abhishek Nailwal | Dubbed version |
| 2014 | Bang Bang | "Priyathama" | Vishal–Shekhar | K Subhas Chandrabose | Ash King | Dubbed version |
| 2023 | Pathaan | "Naa Nijam Rangu" | Vishal–Shekhar | Chaitanya Prasad | | Dubbed version |
| 2024 | Guntur Kaaram | "Oh My Baby" | Thaman S | Ramajogayya Sastry | | |
| 2024 | Devara: Part 1 | "Chuttamalle" | Anirudh Ravichander | Ramajogayya Sastry | | |

== Tamil film songs ==
| Year | Film | Song | Composer(s) | Writer(s) | Co-singer(s) | Notes |
|---|---|---|---|---|---|---|
| 2010 | Naan Mahaan Alla | "Oru Maalai Neram" | Yuvan Shankar Raja | Na. Muthukumar | Javed Ali | |
| 2012 | English Vinglish | "English Vinglish" (Female) | Amit Trivedi | Pa. Vijay | | |
| 2023 | Pathaan | "Azhaiyaa Mazhai" | Vishal–Shekhar | Madhan Karky | Vishal Dadlani | Dubbed version |
| 2023 | Jailer | "Kaavaalaa" | Anirudh Ravichander | Arunraja Kamaraj | | |
| 2025 | Bun Butter Jam | "Etho Pesathane" | Nivas K Prasanna | Vijay Sethupathi | Siddharth | |
| 2025 | Madharaasi | "Unadhu Enadhu" | Anirudh Ravichander | Adesh Krishna | Anirudh Ravichander | |

== Bengali film songs ==
| Year | Film | Song | Composer(s) | Writer(s) | Co-singer(s) |
|---|---|---|---|---|---|
| 2011 | Uro Chithi | "Athanni" | Debojyoti Mishra | Srijato | Taniya Sen |
| 2012 | Awara | "Moner Radio" | Jeet Gannguli | Prosen | Jeet Gannguli |
| 2012 | Jaaneman | "Jaaneman" | Jeet Gannguli | Raja Chanda | Jeet Gannguli |
| 2017 | Projapoti Biskut | "Projapoto Mon" | Indradeep Dasgupta | | solo |
| 2017 | Projapoti Biskut | "Mukhchora Gaan" | Indradeep Dasgupta | | solo |
| 2022 | Doctor Bakshi | "Kotha Dilam Tokey" | Subhadeep Mitra | | Arnab Dutta |

== Malayalam film songs ==
| Year | Film | Song | Composer(s) | Writer(s) | Co-singer(s) | Notes |
|---|---|---|---|---|---|---|
| 2009 | Puthiya Mukham | "Rahasyamay" | Deepak Dev | Kaithapram | KK | |
| 2024 | Devara: Part 1 | "Kanninathan Kamanottam" | Anirudh Ravichander | Mankombu Gopala Krishna | | Dubbed version |

== Kannada film songs ==
| Year | Film | Song | Composer(s) | Writer(s) | Notes |
|---|---|---|---|---|---|
| 2024 | Devara: Part 1 | "Swaathimutthe Sikkangaithe" | Anirudh Ravichander | Varadaraj Chikkaballapura | Dubbed version |

== Gujarati film songs ==
| Year | Film | Song | Composer(s) | Writer(s) | Co-singer(s) |
|---|---|---|---|---|---|
| 2023 | Lakiro | "Tu Nathi Ke Tu Chhe(Hindi Version)" | Parth Bharat Thakkar | Amitabh Verma | Vishal Dadlani |
| 2023 | Lakiro | "Tu Nathi Ke Tu Chhe" | Parth Bharat Thakkar | Amitabh Verma | Vishal Dadlani |

== Hindi non-film songs ==
| Year | Album | Song | Composer(s) | Writer(s) | Co-singer(s) |
|---|---|---|---|---|---|
| 2004 | Krazy Kat (Remix) | "Koi Yahan Nache" (Retro Mix Version) | Bappi Lahiri (Remixed by: Anuj Matthews) | Farooq Qaisar | |
| 2010 | Kaise Ho Tum - Single | "Kaise Ho Tum (Female)" | Agnee | | |
| 2011 | Teri Aankhen | "Saiyaan" | Raaj Aashoo | Murli Agarwal | |
| 2011 | Navya..Naye Dhadkan Naye Sawaal | "Bekaboo" | Vishal–Shekhar | | |
| 2011 | The Dewarists (Season One) | "I Believe" | Parikrama, Agnee | K. Mohan, Rachana B. | Nitin Malik, K. Mohan |
| 2011 | I Vivek | "Darakht Sa" | Shahdaab Bhartiya | Vivek Sudershan | Vivek Sudershan |
| 2011 | Ek Ladki Shabnmi Jaisi | "Sau Raatein" | Arbind Jha | Moied Elham | Apoorv Gupta |
| 2011 | Ek Ladki Shabnmi Jaisi | "Bematlab Thi Zindagi" | Arbind Jha | Arvind Jha | Apoorv Gupta |
| 2011 | Rewind - Nine Lost Memories | "Yadon Ke Idiot Box Mein" (Version 1) | Amartya Rahut | Neelesh Misra | |
| 2011 | Rewind - Nine Lost Memories | "Maazi" | Amartya Rahut | Neelesh Misra | Suraj Jagan |
| 2011 | Rewind - Nine Lost Memories | "Shayad" | Amartya Rahut | Neelesh Misra | Suraj Jagan |
| 2011 | Rewind - Nine Lost Memories | "Roobru" | Amartya Rahut | Neelesh Misra | Neelesh Misra |
| 2011 | Rewind - Nine Lost Memories | "Unka Khayal" | Amartya Rahut | Neelesh Misra | Neelesh Misra |
| 2011 | Rewind - Nine Lost Memories | "Naina Tore" | Amartya Rahut | Neelesh Misra | |
| 2011 | Rewind - Nine Lost Memories | "Dil Raffu" | Amartya Rahut | Neelesh Misra | |
| 2012 | Best of Naturally US | "Jhula" | Anuraag Naidu | Neelesh Misra | |
| 2012 | Best of Naturally US | "Challa" | Anuraag Naidu | Neelesh Misra | |
| 2012 | Best of Naturally US | "Dum Dum" | Anuraag Naidu | Neelesh Misra | |
| 2012 | Best of Naturally US | "Aj Lakha Naiyo" | Anuraag Naidu | Neelesh Misra | |
| 2012 | Best of Naturally US | "Ret Main Sirkiye" | Anuraag Naidu | Neelesh Misra | |
| 2012 | Coke Studio | "Dum Dum" | Shilpa Rao | Shellee | Arun Daga |
| 2012 | Coke Studio | "Hallelujah" | Karsh Kale | Leonard Cohen, Karsh Kale | Karsh Kale |
| 2012 | Coke Studio | "Shedding Skin" | Karsh Kale | Swanand Kirkire | Karsh Kale, Shruti Pathak, Monali Thakur, Apeksha Dandekar |
| 2014 | Poorna - Shri Krishna | "Surdas Ji Likhit: Ankhiyaan Hari Darsan" | Anand Kurhekar | | |
| 2016 | Coke Studio Pakistan | "Paar Chanaa De | Noori | Jaffer Zaidi | Noori |
| 2020 | You're Not Alone | "You're Not Alone" | | Surya Giri | Sid Sriram, SURII |
| 2020 | Those Words | "Those Words" | | Anoushka Shankar, Ayanna witter-Johnson, Shirin Anandita | Anoushka Shankar, Ayanna witter-Johnson |
| 2021 | Roz Roz | "Roz Roz" | The Yellow Diary | Ranjan Batra | Ranjan Batra |
| 2021 | T-Series Mixtape | "Dil Hai Ki Manta Nahin-Nazar Ke Samne" | | Abhijit Vaghani, Sameer | Yasser Desai, Abhijit Vaghani |
| 2022 | Roposo Jamroom | "Main Jee Raha" | Ana Rehman | Shloke Lal | Jazim Sharma |
| 2022 | Ehsaas | "Ehsaas" | Utsavi Jha | Utsavi Jha | |
| 2022 | Awaara Ho | "Awaara Ho(Dream Pop)" | Shashwat Sachdev | Shashwat Sachdev | |
| 2022 | Kaisi Teri Baatein | "Kaisi Teri Baatein" | Suyyash Rai, Ashutosh Rishi | Kaushal Kishore | Suyyash Rai |
| 2023 | Made in India | "Apsara" | Abhijit Vaghani | Bhrigu Parashar, Ek Number | Pratik Solse, Ek Number |
| 2023 | Parindey | "Parindey" | Sanchari Bose | Rahul Yadav | |
| 2023 | Numaani | "Numaani" | Faridkot | IP Singh, Rajarshi Sanyal | Faridkot, Rajarshi Sanyal |
| 2023 | Hundai Spotlight | "Baanwre" | F Kaze | F Kaze, Shloke Lal | F Kaze |
| 2024 | VYRLOriginals | "Jiya Laage Na" | Rochak Kohli | Gurpreet Saini | Mohit Chauhan, Rochak Kohli |

== Other non-film songs ==
| Year | Album | Song | Composer(s) | Writer(s) | Co-singer(s) |
|---|---|---|---|---|---|
| 2016 | Coke Studio Pakistan | "Paar Chanaa De | Noori | Jaffer Zaidi | Noori |
| 2020 | Voices United | "Hum Honge Kamyab" | Kartik Rodriguez | Metalloid Productions | Usha Uthup, Raghu Dixit, Rasika Shekar, Javed Ali, Shillong Chamber choir, Haricharan, Satyaprakash, Shweta Mohan, Tanya Kalsi, N. C. Karunya & Soham Patel |
