= Bang Bang! (soundtrack) =

- Soundtrack album cover

Soundtrack album by Vishal–Shekhar
- Released: 11 September 2014
- Recorded: 2013–2014
- Studio: Vishal & Shekhar Studio, Mumbai
- Genre: Feature film soundtrack
- Length: 22:17
- Label: Zee Music Company
- Producer: Vishal–Shekhar

Vishal–Shekhar chronology
Hasee Toh Phasee (2014)	Bang Bang! (2014)	Happy New Year (2014)
External audio
- Audio Jukebox on YouTube

Singles from Bang Bang!
- 1. "Tu Meri" Released: 18 August 2014; 2. "Meherbaan" Released: 6 September 2014

Bang Bang! is the soundtrack to the 2014 film of the same name directed by Siddharth Anand starring Hrithik Roshan and Katrina Kaif. Produced by Fox Star Studios, the film is an adaptation of the American film Knight and Day (2010). The film's musical score is composed by Salim–Sulaiman, while the five-song soundtrack accompanying the film is composed by the duo Vishal–Shekhar and lyrics written by Vishal Dadlani, Anvita Dutt and Kumaar. The soundtrack to the film was released by Zee Music Company on 11 September 2014.

== Release ==
The soundtrack to the film featured four original songs, including a reprised version of one of the tracks. Zee Music Company acquired the music rights for the film. The album was preceded with the single "Tu Meri" written and sung by Vishal Dadlani on 18 August 2014, with a music video accompanying the same day. It was then followed by the second single "Meherbaan" written by Anvita Dutt Guptan and sung by Ash King, Shilpa Rao and Shekhar Ravjiani. The music video for the song was released on 3 September 2014, and the digital single released three days later. The teaser of the title song was released on 10 September 2014 featuring Roshan and Kaif. Two days later, the official music video of the song was released. The track was written by Dadlani, who also performed backing vocals on it, and sung by Benny Dayal and Neeti Mohan. It was choreographed by Bosco–Caesar. The song experience was "fun" for Roshan, who said, "It's my ode to the inspiration he [Michael Jackson] has been". A music launch was held on 11 September 2014, with Roshan, Kaif, Anand, Vishal–Shekhar to release the soundtrack containing the remainder of the tracks.

== Reception ==
Joginder Tuteja of Rediff.com described that "the musical team [Vishal–Shekhar] have created enough good numbers to entertain us" assigning 3.5 out of 5. Rajiv Vijayakar of Bollywood Hungama gave 3.5 out of 5 and wrote "Hooks, catchphrases and beats more than musical or lyrical substance are the three anchors of the score. This is a score that will be liked in passing."

== Track listing ==
=== Hindi ===
No.	Title	Lyrics	Singer(s)	Length
1.	"Tu Meri"	Vishal Dadlani	Vishal Dadlani	04:16
2.	"Meherbaan"	Anvita Dutt, Kumaar	Ash King, Shilpa Rao, Shekhar Ravjiani	05:07
3.	"Uff"	Anvita Dutt	Benny Dayal, Harshdeep Kaur	04:32
4.	"Bang Bang"	Vishal Dadlani	Benny Dayal, Neeti Mohan	05:20
5.	"Meherbaan" (Reprise)	Anvita Dutt, Kumaar	Shekhar Ravjiani	03:01
Total length:				22:17

=== Tamil ===
All lyrics are written by Madhan Karky.

No.	Title	Singer(s)	Length
1.	"En Kaiyil"	Benny Dayal	04:17
2.	"Pavanmaai"	Ash King, Anusha Mani	05:15
3.	"Uff"	Benny Dayal	03:16
4.	"Bang Bang"	Benny Dayal, Neeti Mohan	04:08
Total length:			16:56

=== Telugu ===
All lyrics are written by Chandrabose.

No.	Title	Singer(s)	Length
1.	"Ivvaleyee Gaaluloo"	Benny Dayal	04:17
2.	"Priyathama"	Ash King, Shilpa Rao	05:15
3.	"Uff"	Benny Dayal	03:16
4.	"Bang Bang"	Benny Dayal, Neeti Mohan	04:08
Total length:			16:56

== Accolades ==
Award	Category	Recipient(s) and nominee(s)	Result	Ref.
BIG Star Entertainment Awards	Most Entertaining Music Director	Vishal–Shekhar	Nominated	
Bollywood Hungama Surfers Choice Music Awards	Best Soundtrack	Bang Bang! — Vishal–Shekhar	Nominated	
Global Indian Music Academy Awards	Best Film Album	Bang Bang!	Nominated	
Global Indian Music Academy Awards	Best Film Song	"Tu Meri"	Nominated	
Global Indian Music Academy Awards	Best Music Director	Vishal–Shekhar	Nominated	
Global Indian Music Academy Awards	Best Duet	Benny Dayal and Neeti Mohan — ("Bang Bang")	Nominated	
Global Indian Music Academy Awards	Best Music Arranger and Programmer	Abhijit Nalani and Zoheb Khan — ("Bang Bang")	Nominated	
Mirchi Music Awards	Male Vocalist of The Year	Vishal Dadlani — ("Tu Meri")	Nominated	
Mirchi Music Awards	Best Song Producer (Programming & Arranging)	Abhijit Nalani and Zoheb Khan — ("Bang Bang")	Nominated	
