= Dhoom 3 (soundtrack) =

- Soundtrack album cover

Soundtrack album by Pritam
- Released: 9 December 2013
- Recorded: YRF Studios; Mumbai, India
- Genre: Feature film soundtrack
- Length: 27:24
- Language: Hindi
- Label: YRF Music
- Producer: Aditya Chopra

Pritam chronology
| R... Rajkumar (2013) | Dhoom 3 (2013) | Yaariyan (2014) |

Dhoom 3 is the soundtrack album for 2013 action thriller film of the same name which was written and directed by Vijay Krishna Acharya and produced by Aditya Chopra, who also co-wrote the story and also serves as the third instalment of the Dhoom franchise and starred Aamir Khan, Abhishek Bachchan and Katrina Kaif in the lead roles. The film's soundtrack was composed by Pritam while the film's score was composed by Julius Packiam, who replaced Salim-Sulaiman from the first two films.

== Development ==
It was announced that the composer of Dhoom and Dhoom 2; Pritam, would return once again to compose the music of the third instalment. Earlier reports suggested that Shefali Alvares had been roped to sing the Dhoom title track, but this turned out to be a rumour. Aamir said in a statement that the title track "Dhoom Machale Dhoom" is dedicated to Sachin Tendulkar who was then playing his 200th and final test match at the Wankhede Stadium. The song "Bande Hain Hum Uske" was sung by Shankar Mahadevan's 12-year-old son Shivam Mahadevan and Anish Sharma. His elder son Siddharth Mahadevan sung the song "Malang" in the film along with Shilpa Rao.

While Sameer Anjaan returned to write the lyrics for Dhoom 3, he eventually wrote only two songs including the title track due to an earlier fallout with Pritam, while two additional lyricists, Amitabh Bhattacharya and Kausar Munir, wrote a song each. Sameer and Pritam eventually did not work with each other for at least a decade, though they briefly shared lyricist-composer credit alongside Bhattacharya and Tanishk Bagchi in Bhool Bhulaiyaa 2 (2022). They ultimately reunited 12 years later for the Salman Khan-starrer Sikandar (2025), whose soundtrack failed to leave a mark.

== Release ==
The title song's video featuring Katrina Kaif and sung by Aditi Singh Sharma was unveiled on 14 November 2013. The first look of the song "Malang" was revealed on 25 November 2013. A teaser for "Dhoom Tap" featured Aamir Khan tap dancing to beats, along with background dancers. It was unveiled on 3 December 2013. A teaser for the song "Kamli", featuring Katrina Kaif and sung by Sunidhi Chauhan was revealed on 6 December 2013. The title song "Dhoom Machale" was also recorded in an Arabic version sung by Lebanese singer Naya. A Spanish version of "Dhoom Machale" song sung by Mia Mont was released by Yashraj Films on 4 January 2014.

== Track listing ==
Hindi Track listing
| No. | Title | Lyrics | Singer(s) | Length |
|---|---|---|---|---|
| 1. | "Malang" | Sameer Anjaan | Siddharth Mahadevan, Shilpa Rao, Mauzzam, Rizwan, Shadaab Faridi | 4:33 |
| 2. | "Kamli" | Amitabh Bhattacharya | Sunidhi Chauhan | 3:55 |
| 3. | "Tu Hi Junoon" | Kausar Munir | Mohit Chauhan | 5:02 |
| 4. | "Dhoom Machale Dhoom" | Sameer Anjaan | Aditi Singh Sharma | 3:56 |
| 5. | "Bande Hain Hum Uske" | | Shivam Mahadevan, Anish Sharma | 3:05 |
| 6. | "Dhoom Tap" | | Instrumental | 2:47 |
| 7. | "Dhoom : 3 Overture" | | Instrumental | 4:10 |
| 8. | "Dhoom Machale Dhoom" (Arabic) | | Naya | 3:48 |
| 9. | "Dhoom Machale Dhoom" (Spanish) | | Mia Mont | 3:47 |
| Total length: | | | | 27:24 |

Tamil Track listing
| No. | Title | Singer(s) | Length |
|---|---|---|---|
| 1. | "Matanga" | Abishek Nailwal, Mahalakshmi Iyer | 4:32 |
| 2. | "Amali Dhumali" | Sunidhi Chauhan | 3:52 |
| 3. | "Dhoom Majare" | Aditi Singh Sharma | 3:55 |
| 4. | "Ore Oru Paravai" | Mohit Chauhan | 5:00 |
| 5. | "Dhoom Majare Dhoom" | Aditi Singh Sharma | 3:57 |
| 6. | "Nam Padaithavanin Pillaigal" | Shivam Mahadevan, Anish Sharma | 3:04 |
| 7. | "Dhoom Tap" | Pritam | 2:52 |
| 8. | "Dhoom: 3 Overture" | Julius Packiam | 4:09 |
| Total length: | | | 31:21 |

Telugu Track listing
| No. | Title | Singer(s) | Length |
|---|---|---|---|
| 1. | "Dhoom Majale Dhoom" | Aditi Singh Sharma | 3:57 |
| 2. | "Nemali" | Sunidhi Chauhan | 3:54 |
| 3. | "Tarang" | Abishek Nailwal, Shilpa Rao | 3:55 |
| 4. | "Oohinchale Oohinchale" | Mohit Chauhan | 5:03 |
| 5. | "Pillalam Memathaniki" | Shivam Mahadevan, Anish Sharma | 3:04 |
| 6. | "Dhoom Tap" | Pritam | 2:52 |
| 7. | "Dhoom: 3 Overture" | Julius Packiam | 4:09 |
| Total length: | | | 27:37 |

== Reception ==
The music of Dhoom 3 received a mixed critical reception. Joginder Tuteja of Rediff.com noted, "There are songs like 'Tu Hi Junoon', 'Malang' and 'Kamli' that round off Dhoom 3 beautifully." Koimoi reported, "Overall it might not be the best album Pritam has come up with, but two really interesting compositions make the album scrupulous me! A noteworthy effort for sure!" The predictions turned out to be true as the album topped the iTunes charts only after the release of the film. Rohit Khilnani of India Today deemed the music "below average".
