= Devara: Part 1 (soundtrack) =

2024 soundtrack album by Anirudh Ravichander

- Soundtrack album cover

Soundtrack album by Anirudh Ravichander
- Released: 26 September 2024
- Recorded: November 2022–March 2024
- Studios: Albuquerque Studios, Chennai; AM Studios, Chennai; 2 BarQ Studios, Chennai; Sounds Right Studio, Chennai; Vanajkesav Digi Audio Waves, Chennai; Sruthi Audio Labs, Hyderabad; Wibe Studios, Mumbai; YRF Studios, Mumbai; Studio DMI, Las Vegas
- Genre: Feature film soundtrack
- Length: 13:40
- Language: Telugu
- Label: T-Series
- Producer: Anirudh Ravichander

Anirudh Ravichander chronology
Indian 2 (2024)	Devara: Part 1 (2024)	Vettaiyan (2024)
External audio
- Devara: Part 1 (Jukebox) on YouTube

Singles from Devara: Part 1
- 1. "Fear Song" Released: 19 May 2024; 2. "Chuttamalle" Released: 5 August 2024; 3. "Daavudi" Released: 4 September 2024

Devara: Part 1 is the soundtrack album composed by Anirudh Ravichander to the 2024 Telugu-language action drama film of the same name directed by Koratala Siva, starring N. T. Rama Rao Jr and Saif Ali Khan. The lyrics were written by Ramajogayya Sastry in Telugu, Vishnu Edavan, Vignesh Shivan and Pa. Vijay in Tamil, Manoj Muntashir and Kausar Munir in Hindi, Mankombu Gopalakrishnan in Malayalam and Varadaraj Chikkaballapura in Kannada. The soundtrack album which consisted of four songs was released under the T-Series label on 26 September 2024.

== Production ==
The film's soundtrack album and background score are composed by Anirudh Ravichander in his fourth Telugu project after Agnyaathavaasi (2018), Jersey (2019), and Nani's Gang Leader (2019). This also marks the second time Siva has worked with another music director besides his frequent collaborator, Devi Sri Prasad. At a press conference in Chennai, Anirudh recalled that the actor's fans had trended on Twitter insisting his inclusion for a future project, which led the team rope him for the film.Anirudh was initially roped in for Aravinda Sametha Veera Raghava (2018) before he was replaced by Thaman S as the composer. He further added, "When Koratala Siva sir narrated the story to me, I was genuinely excited and entertained. I realised that it is not a mainstream Telugu film, but a rather different idea in the commercial genre. I had also not done a mass film in Telugu until then. Additionally, this film is Anna's solo release after 6 years, which means that it will have a lot of expectations."

The music sittings for the film began in November 2022. In August 2023, Ramajogayya Sastry in his X (formerly Twitter) account, had announced that he had started writing the lyrics for the film's songs. While recording the film's music and score, Anirudh impressed on the film's production values, scale and opulence of grandeur, as well as it having a multitude of emotions, which felt that working in three films at once. Anirudh recorded the film score during the third quarter of 2024, at Budapest with Budapest Scoring Orchestra performing the score. He utilized newer instrumentations and soundscape to bring a fresh sound.

The film's music rights were purchased by T-Series at the price of ₹27 crore (US$2.8 million).

== Release ==
The first single, titled "Fear Song" was released on the eve of Rama Rao's birthday, 19 May 2024 in all five languages with vocals by Anirudh in Telugu, Tamil and Hindi, and Santhosh Venky in Kannada and Malayalam. The second single titled "Chuttamalle" (in Telugu), "Paththavaikkum" (in Tamil), "Dheere Dheere" (in Hindi), "Kanninathan Kamanottam" (in Malayalam) and "Swaathimutthe Sikkangaithe" (in Kannada) was released on 5 August 2024. The song was performed by Shilpa Rao in all versions, except for the Tamil version which was sung by Deepthi Suresh.

The third single titled "Daavudi" was released on 4 September 2024. A fast-paced duet, Nakash Aziz provided vocals for the male counterpart in all versions, while Akasa Singh did the same for the female counterpart in Telugu, Hindi and Kannada, and Ramya Behara for Tamil and Malayalam. The song was not included in the film. On 18 September 2024, the makers announced that the song "Ayudha Pooja" which set in the backdrop of the Ayudha Puja celebrations and was highly anticipated among fans, would be released as the concurrent single from the album, the following day. However, the makers announced on the same evening, that the release of the song was indefinitely delayed. Later, it was released as a part of the soundtrack album on 26 September 2024.

== Track listing ==
All lyrics are written by Ramajogayya Sastry.

Telugu
No.	Title	Singer(s)	Length
1.	"Fear Song"	Anirudh Ravichander	3:15
2.	"Chuttamalle"	Shilpa Rao	3:42
3.	"Daavudi"	Nakash Aziz, Akasa Singh	3:49
4.	"Ayudha Pooja"	Kaala Bhairava	2:54
Total length:			13:40

Tamil
No.	Title	Lyrics	Singer(s)	Length
1.	"Fear Song"	Vishnu Edavan	Anirudh Ravichander	3:15
2.	"Paththavaikkum"	Vignesh Shivan	Deepthi Suresh	3:42
3.	"Daavudi"	Vignesh Shivan	Nakash Aziz, Ramya Behara	3:49
4.	"Ayudha Pooja"	Pa. Vijay	Kaala Bhairava	2:54
Total length:				13:40

All lyrics are written by Mankombu Gopalakrishnan.

Malayalam
No.	Title	Singer(s)	Length
1.	"Fear Song"	Santhosh Venky	3:15
2.	"Kanninathan Kamanottam"	Shilpa Rao	3:42
3.	"Daavudi"	Ankit Tiwari, Ramya Behara	3:49
4.	"Ayudha Pooja"	Kaala Bhairava	2:54
Total length:			13:40

All lyrics are written by Varadaraj Chikkaballapura.

Kannada
No.	Title	Singer(s)	Length
1.	"Fear Song"	Santhosh Venky	3:15
2.	"Swaathimutthe Sikkangaithe"	Shilpa Rao	3:42
3.	"Daavudi"	Anup Jalota, Akasa Singh	3:49
4.	"Ayudha Pooja"	Santhosh Venky	2:54
Total length:			13:40

Hindi
No.	Title	Lyrics	Singer(s)	Length
1.	"Fear Song"	Manoj Muntashir	Anirudh Ravichander	3:15
2.	"Dheere Dheere"	Kausar Munir	Shilpa Rao	3:42
3.	"Daavudi"	Kausar Munir	Nakash Aziz, Akasa Singh	3:49
4.	"Ayudha Pooja"	Manoj Muntashir	Kaala Bhairava	2:54
Total length:				13:40

== Non-album singles ==
The song "All Hail the Tiger" which featured in the 90-second glimpse video was released much earlier on 9 January 2024. It was performed by Anirudh and Natalie De Luccio, with lyrics written by Heisenberg. The separate musical piece which soundtracked the film's trailer was released under the title "Red Sea" on 12 September 2024, two days after the trailer's release.

No.	Title	Lyrics	Singer(s)	Length
1.	"All Hail the Tiger"	Heisenberg	Anirudh Ravichander, Natalie Di Luccio	1:26
2.	"Red Sea"	Heisenberg	Anirudh Ravichander	2:42
3.	"Devara Thandavam" (Instrumental)	–	–	2:18

== Background score ==
Devara: Part 1

Film score by Anirudh Ravichander
- Released: 11 April 2025
- Recorded: 2023–2024
- Genre: Film score
- Length: 21:37
- Language: Telugu
- Label: T-Series
- Producer: Anirudh Ravichander

No.	Title	Length
1.	"Cop Hunt"	0:58
2.	"Bhaira Theme"	1:31
3.	"Legend of Devara"	1:10
4.	"Devara Arrives"	1:13
5.	"The Robbery – I"	0:42
6.	"Family Matters"	0:51
7.	"Ayudha Pooja Theme"	1:16
8.	"Devara Enters The Ring"	1:19
9.	"The Robbery – II"	1:25
10.	"Fear Theme"	2:03
11.	"Thandavam Feels"	1:27
12.	"Interval Fight"	1:53
13.	"Vara Arrives"	0:55
14.	"Thangam Theme"	1:20
15.	"Man of Masses"	0:43
16.	"Red Sea"	2:43
Total length:		21:37

== Reception ==
Christy Rosy Sibi of The Week wrote, "[Anirudh] does everything in his power to bring the plot alive. He ever so gracefully magnetised the scenes to his music, enticing emotions that the audience would not have felt otherwise." Sangeetha Devi Dundoo of The Hindu, with praise for the film's technical departments, added, "The one who has had the most fun, though, is Anirudh Ravichander. Sometimes with rock-inspired score and sometimes using the traditional dol and dappu, his music infuses energy into the proceedings." Balakrishna Ganeshan of The News Minute added that Anirudh's "bombastic music score" amped up the emotions.

Rajasekar S of The Federal wrote, "Anirudh is another big asset of the film, his background score and songs amplify many adequate moments." Janani K. of India Today wrote, "Composer Anirudh Ravichander's background music elevates certain theatrical moments, but the songs act as speedbreakers in the film." Saibal Chatterjee of NDTV wrote, "Anirudh Ravichander's BGM rises and falls in keeping with the needs of the action, which, in effect, means that it is almost always flirting with distracting crescendos. The songs, too, come and go without creating much impact."

== Controversy ==
The song "Chuttamalle" was alleged to be copied from the viral Sri Lankan song "Manike Mage Hithe" performed by Yohani and Satheesan, after users compared both the songs having similarities in terms of instrumental arrangements and compositions. However, the original composer Chamath Sangeeth responded to it, as he elated on his song had inspired Anirudh to create something similar.

== Album credits ==
Credits adapted from liner notes:

- Anirudh Ravichander – singer (track: 1), composer (all tracks), producer (all tracks), musical arrangements (all tracks), keyboard programming (all tracks), synth programming (all tracks), rhythm programming (all tracks)
- Saketh Komanduri – backing vocalist (tracks: 1, 4)
- Arun Kaundinya – backing vocalist (tracks: 1, 4)
- Ritesh G Rao – backing vocalist (tracks: 1, 4)
- Saicharan Bhaskaruni – backing vocalist (tracks: 1, 4)
- J. V. Sudhanshu – backing vocalist (tracks: 1, 4)
- Anirudh Suswaram – backing vocalist (tracks: 1, 4)
- Arjun Vijay – backing vocalist (tracks: 1, 4)
- Akhil Chandra – backing vocalist (tracks: 1, 4)
- Chaitu Satsangi – backing vocalist (track: 1)
- Sumanas Kasula – backing vocalist (track: 1)
- Bharadwaj Krishna – backing vocalist (track: 4)
- Sri Krishna – vocal supervision (tracks: 1, 3, 4)
- Keba Jeremiah – electric guitar (tracks: 1, 2, 4), acoustic guitar (track: 2), charango (track: 2)
- Amalraj – Arabic violin (track: 4), violas (track: 4), cumbus (track: 4), cocolin (track: 4), Chinese bow (track: 4), Turkish violin (track: 4), ruan (track: 4), liuqin (track: 4)
- Tapas Roy – strings (track: 4), dobro guitar (track: 4), bouzuki (track: 4), shamisen (track: 4)
- Omkar Dhumal – oud (track: 4), saz (track: 4)
- Subhani – strings (track: 4), mandolin (track: 4), charango (track: 4), ghuzheng (track: 4)
- Nikhiram TP – woodwinds (track: 4)
- Lalit Talluri – woodwinds (track: 4)
- Ananthakrrishnan – music advisor (all tracks), violin (track: 2)
- Arish – keyboard programming (tracks: 1, 2, 3)
- Sai Abhyankkar – keyboard programming (track: 1)
- Ashwin Krishna – keyboard programming (track: 1)
- Beven – keyboard programming (track: 2)
- Narendar S – keyboard programming (track: 2)
- Shashank Vijay – rhythm programming (tracks: 1, 2, 3), rhythm production (track: 2)
- Karthik Vamsi – rhythm programming (tracks: 2, 3)
- Krishna Kishore – rhythm programming (tracks: 2, 3)
- Srinivasan M. – recording engineer (Albuquerque Records, Chennai) [all tracks], mixing engineer (all tracks)
- Shivakaran S. – recording engineer (Albuquerque Records, Chennai) [all tracks]
- Srinath Komanduri – recording engineer (Sruthi Audio Labs, Hyderabad) [tracks: 1, 4]
- Pradeep Menon – recording engineer (AM Studios, Chennai) [tracks: 1, 4]
- Krishnan Subramanian – recording engineer (AM Studios, Chennai) [tracks: 1, 4]
- Manoj Raman – recording engineer (AM Studios, Chennai) [tracks: 1, 4]
- Ainul Haq – recording engineer (AM Studios, Chennai) [tracks: 1, 4]
- Aravind Crescendo – recording engineer (AM Studios, Chennai) [tracks: 1, 4]
- Hari S. R. – recording engineer (YRF Studios, Mumbai) [tracks: 2, 3]
- Abhishek Khandelwal – recording engineer (YRF Studios, Mumbai) [tracks: 2, 3]
- Santanu Ghatak – recording engineer (YRF Studios, Mumbai) [tracks: 2, 3]
- Chinmay Mestry – recording engineer (YRF Studios, Mumbai) [tracks: 2, 3]
- Asa Singh – recording engineer (Wibe Studios, Mumbai) [track: 3]
- Kashyap Rammohan – recording engineer (2 BarQ Studios, Chennai) [track: 4]
- Rohan Harish – recording engineer (2 BarQ Studios, Chennai) [track: 4]
- Aswin George John – recording engineer (Sounds Right Studio, Chennai) [track: 4]
- Senthil Prasad – recording engineer (Vanajkesav Digi Audio Waves, Chennai) [tracks: 1, 4]
- Vinay Sridhar – mixing engineer (Albuquerque Records, Chennai) [all tracks]
- Luca Pretolesi – mastering engineer (Studio DMI, Las Vegas) [all tracks]
- Alistair Pintus – mastering assistance
- Sajith Sathya – creative consultant
- Velavan B. – music co-ordinator
