= Indian 2 (soundtrack) =

2024 soundtrack album by Anirudh Ravichander

- Soundtrack album cover

Soundtrack album by Anirudh Ravichander
- Released: 1 June 2024
- Recorded: 4 December 2017 –10 March 2024
- Studios: Rottenbiller Utca, Budapest; Shruti Audio Labs, Hyderabad; Strings 7 Studio, Chennai; Adagio Roof Studios, Mumbai; Offbeat Music Ventures, Chennai; Albuquerque Records, Chennai; Studio DMI, Las Vegas
- Genre: Feature film soundtrack
- Length: 22:38
- Language: Tamil
- Label: Sony Music India
- Producer: Anirudh Ravichander

Anirudh Ravichander chronology
Leo (2023)	Indian 2 (2024)	Devara: Part 1 (2024)

Singles from Indian 2
- 1. "Paaraa" Released: 22 May 2024; 2. "Neelorpam" Released: 29 May 2024; 3. "Kadharalz" Released: 07 June 2024

Indian 2 is the soundtrack album composed by Anirudh Ravichander for the Indian Tamil-language film of the same name, directed by S. Shankar, starring Kamal Haasan. The film is jointly produced by Lyca Productions and Red Giant Movies.

Anirudh was chosen to compose the songs, during the pre-production works of the film in November 2017. The recording process for the songs and original score, took place for nearly six years. The soundtrack album features six songs written by Pa. Vijay, Kabilan Vairamuthu, Thamarai, Arivu, Rokesh and Anirudh himself, with two of them being released as singles. The soundtrack was released digitally through Sony Music India on 1 June 2024.

== Production ==
The soundtrack album and background score are composed by Anirudh Ravichander, in his first collaboration with Shankar. He replaces Shankar's frequent collaborator A. R. Rahman, who scored the original film. This will mark the second collaboration of Anirudh with Haasan, after Vikram. In an interview Rahman stated that "Kamal had mentioned me to score for its sequel, but Shankar eventually had other ideas. Shankar is a person who wants to get inspired. Sometimes, when you work with the same person back-to-back, you get bored. Also 2.0 is a difficult film that took me a long time to complete. Maybe Shankar thought he shouldn't make me overwork. That could be one of the reasons why he had chosen Anirudh."

Anirudh Ravichander stated working with Shankar as a "dream come true moment"; he eventually quoted Indian is a cult album and one of his favourites from Rahman's composition. In an interview with India Today, Anirudh stated about the comparisons of the first part to its sequel, that "With sequels, there are always comparisons on which one is better, but then nobody can match Rahman's work. I can never recreate the magic that Indian did in the 90s. Whatever I can do to the best of my abilities is what I am trying to do." After the offer came his way in November 2017, Anirudh started composing for the songs during December 2017, and it took a year to complete the album. He remarked that the delay in the release of 2.0 gave him more time to work on the film's songs.

In May 2018, Thamarai was hired to write one of the songs, in her maiden collaboration with Shankar. During the film's launch, lyricists Pa. Vijay, Vignesh Shivan and Vivek were hired for writing the songs. However, only the former has been confirmed as the lyricist, while Kabilan Vairamuthu and Arivu also joined the songwriting team. In March 2023, Anirudh revealed that he would curate fresh tunes for the film score but would also incorporate Rahman's cues from the predecessor, as Rahman had granted him permission to reuse his compositions for the film. A behind-the-scenes video of Anirudh composing a "peppy" number at his caravan at the film's sets, with the supervision of Shankar released in May 2023. Anirudh recorded the background score in January 2024.

== Release ==
In November 2023, it was announced that the audio rights for the film were acquired by Sony Music India. The song "Come Back Indian" was featured in the glimpse video, which had lyrics penned by Arivu and sung by Anirudh himself.

The promo of first single was unveiled on 21 May 2024. The first single, "Paaraa", was released on 22 May 2024 together with the Telugu and Hindi versions of the song, titled "Souraa" and "Jaago" respectively. The second single's promo was released on 28 May 2024. The second single, "Neelorpam", was released on 29 May 2024 together with the Telugu and Hindi versions of the song, titled "Chengaluva" and "Dhaage" respectively. The Tamil album was officially released on 1 June 2024, which coincided with a promotional event held at Jawaharlal Nehru Indoor Stadium in Chennai, with the presence of the film's cast and crew and all the other celebrities.

== Track listing ==
The tracklist consisting of 6 songs was revealed by Anirudh on his Twitter handle a day prior to the audio launch. The song Neelorpam did not feature in the film, and the song Paaraa is shown to be a part of the third installment of the film during the end credits.

Track listing
No.	Title	Lyrics	Singer(s)	Length
1.	"Paaraa"	Pa. Vijay	Anirudh Ravichander, Shruthika Samudhrala	4:12
2.	"Calendar Song"	Kabilan Vairamuthu	SUVI, Aishwarya Suresh	3:40
3.	"Neelorpam"	Thamarai	Abby V, Shruthika Samudhrala	5:05
4.	"Zaga Zaga"	Anirudh Ravichander	Anirudh Ravichander	2:07
5.	"Come Back Indian"	Arivu	Anirudh Ravichander	3:37
6.	"Kadharalz"	Rokesh	Anirudh Ravichander	3:57
Total length:				22:38

Telugu
No.	Title	Lyrics	Singer(s)	Length
1.	"Souraa"	Suddala Ashok Teja	Ritesh G Rao, Shruthika Samudhrala	4:12
2.	"Calendar Song"	Chandrabose	Sravana Bhargavi	3:41
3.	"Chengaluva"	Ramajogayya Sastry	Abby V, Shruthika Samudhrala	5:05
4.	"Zaga Zaga"	Anirudh Ravichander	Anirudh Ravichander	2:07
5.	"Come Back Indian"	Sri Mani	Sri Krishna	3:37
6.	"Thatha Vasthaade"	Kasarla Shyam	Arun Kaundinya	3:57
Total length:				22:38

Hindi
No.	Title	Lyrics	Singer(s)	Length
1.	"Jaago"	Manoj Muntashir	Ritesh G Rao, Shruthika Samudhrala	4:12
2.	"Calendar Song"	Kausar Munir	Sravana Bhargavi	3:41
3.	"Dhaage"	Manoj Muntashir	Abby V, Shruthika Samudhrala	5:05
4.	"ZagaZaga"	Anirudh Ravichander	Anirudh Ravichander	2:06
5.	"Come Back Indian"	Kumaar	Sri Krishna	3:38
6.	"Dada Aara Re"	Kumaar	Anirudh Ravichander	3:55

== Reception ==
The songs received a mixed response criticising the compositions.
