= Bogda (film) =

- Directed by: Nisheeta Keni
- Written by: Nisheeta Keni
- Screenplay by: Nisheeta Keni; Omkar Mangesh Datt
- Produced by: Karan Konde; Suresh Panmand; Nisheeta Keni; Nanda Panmand
- Starring: Suhas Joshi; Mrunmayee Deshpande; Rohit Kokate
- Cinematography: Pradeep Vignavelu
- Edited by: Parth Saurabh
- Music by: Siddharth Mahadevan; Soumil Shringarpure
- Production company: Nitin Keni Creations Pvt Ltd
- Distributed by: Panorama Studios
- Release date: 7 September 2018
- Running time: 123 minutes
- Country: India
- Language: Marathi

Bogda is a 2018 Indian Marathi-language film directed and written by Nisheeta Keni. Produced by Nitin Keni under banner of Nitin Keni Creations. It stars Suhas Joshi, Mrunmayee Deshpande and Rohit Kokate.

== Cast ==
- Suhas Joshi as Maai
- Mrunmayee Deshpande as Tejaswini
- Rohit Kokate as Kishor
- Jayant Gadekar
- Ajinkya Bhosale

== Music ==
No.	Title	Lyrics	Music	Singer(s)	Length
1.	"Zhumbad"	Manndar Cholkar	Siddharth Mahadevan, Soumil Shringarpure	Siddharth Mahadevan	4:10
2.	"Banjaara"	Mandar Cholkar	Siddharth Mahadevan, Soumil Shringarpure	Vishal Dadlani	3:44
3.	"Anolkhi Vaat"	Manndar Cholkar	Siddharth Mahadevan, Soumil Shringarpure	Shashaa Tirupati	3:52
Total length:					4:72
