= Ash King =

Indian musician

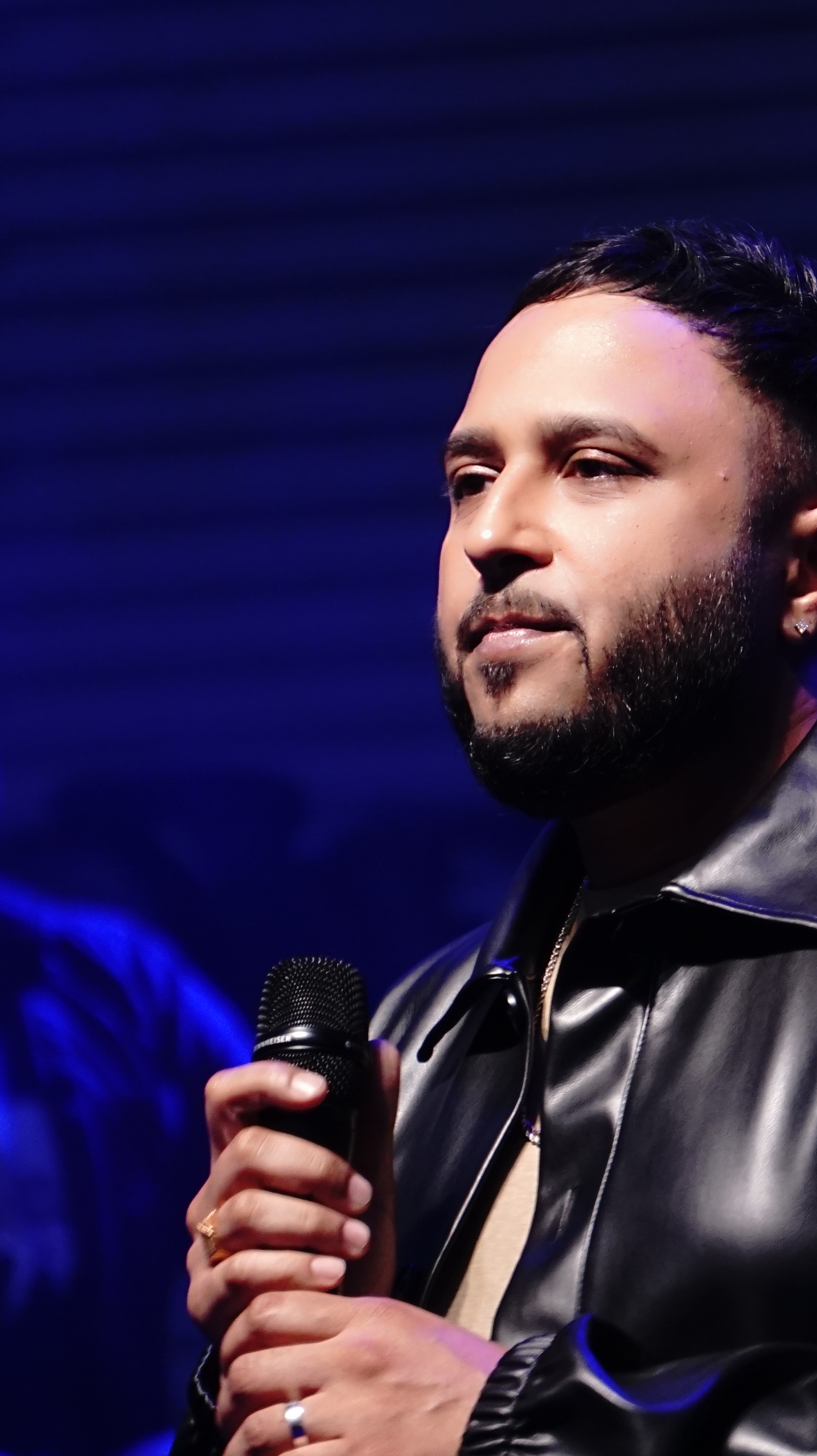

Background information
- Born: Ashutosh Ganguly; London, England
- Genre: Pop/Soul
- Occupations: Singer; composer; songwriter
- Instrument: Vocals
- Years active: 2009–present

Ashutosh Ganguly, better known by his stage name Ash King, is a British singer, songwriter and composer. He made his playback singing debut in Rakeysh Omprakash Mehra's Delhi-6. He is a relative of prominent Indian singer Kishore Kumar. He has also sung the song "Carbon Copy" in the film Drishyam.

== Personal life ==
Ash King is from a family of musicians who has shaped his relationship with music. His grandfather Brajendra Lal Ganguly was the first Indian classical music teacher at Nobel laureate Rabindranath Tagore's home and school Shantiniketan, and also a prominent freedom fighter for India and close ally of Subhas Chandra Bose and first cousin of Kishore Kumar's father. King spent his childhood surrounded by celebrated musical artists with whom his father worked closely with. His father used to perform with Ravi Shankar in India back in the sixties. According to him, when he was very young, George Harrison visited their house at Wembley as he was into Indian classical music. His mother hails from Karamsad, Gujarat.

He was influenced early on by joining a Gospel choir.

== Career ==
His first Bollywood break was with A. R. Rahman on the film Delhi-6 which he recorded at Rahman's personal studio. Rahman invited King, to his London home after friends sang his praises. He was impressed with the 25-year-old's voice, he flew him to Chennai to record in his private studio. Since then he has gone on to sing Te Amo for the film Dum Maaro Dum, I Love You for the film Bodyguard and featured on Suno Aisha from the film Aisha.

Ash Featured on Lady Gaga's official single for Bad Romance on a remix of Just Dance, this was also used in the remix album and the Asian release of the album.

Ash is also a prominent singer in the UK, having sung and co-written the song Love Is Blind which he sang with singer Ramzi and featured on the song Look For Me with Hard Kaur. In 2011, Ash performed at some of the biggest events in the UK including performances at Glastonbury Festival for the BBC and also performed on the main stage at the BBC London Mela.

After 2011, in 2012 Ash was appointed for a Bengali song "Kothin" of Bojhena Shey Bojhena film. He also took part in MTV India's 'MTV Unplugged' – Series 2, with a whole episode dedicated to his hits. Other performers included A R Rahman, Sunidhi Chauhan and Shafqat Amanat Ali Khan. In April 2013 he headlined a concert at the Southbank Centre in London, alongside Sufi/Bollywood singer Harshdeep Kaur.

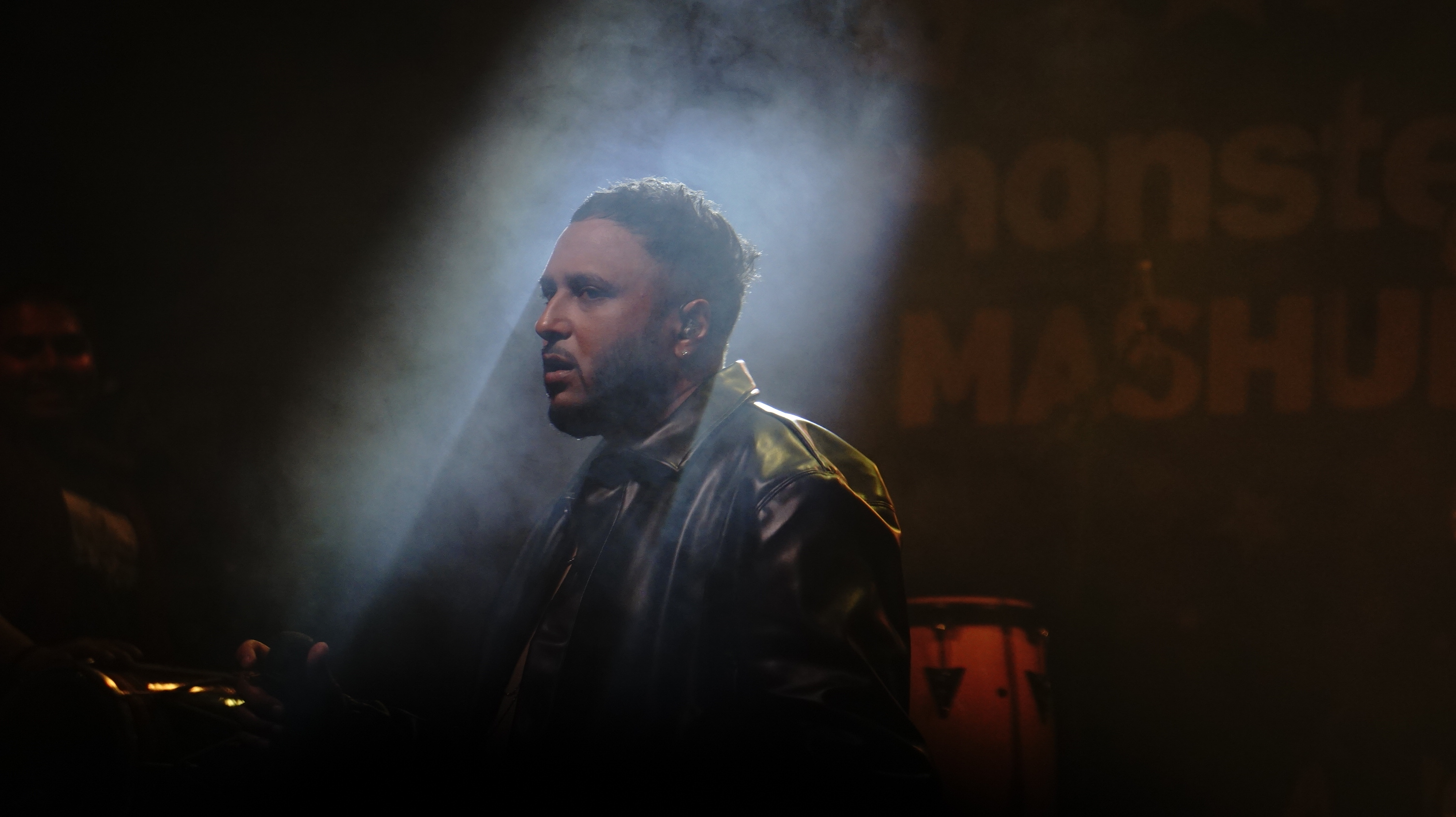
Ash King

== Filmography ==
Denotes films that have not yet been released

Year	Film	Song Name	Co-Singer	Composer	Notes
2009	Delhi-6	Dil Gira Dafatan	Chinmayi	A. R. Rahman	
2010	Aisha	Suno Aisha	Nakash Aziz, Amit Trivedi	Amit Trivedi	
2011	Dum Maaro Dum	Te Amo (Duet)	Sunidhi Chauhan	Pritam	
2011	Dum Maaro Dum	Te Amo (Remix)	Sunidhi Chauhan	Pritam	
2011	Bodyguard	I Love You	Clinton Cerejo	Pritam	Nominated – IIFA Awards for Best Male Playback Singer
2011	Mujhse Fraaandship Karoge	Uh-Oh Uh-Oh!	Shilpa Rao	Raghu Dixit	
2011	Mujhse Fraaandship Karoge	Uh-Oh-Uh-Oh 2.0	Shilpa Rao	Raghu Dixit	
2012	Ek Main Aur Ekk Tu	Aunty Ji	Bianca Gomes, Neuman Pinto, Fionas Pinto	Amit Trivedi	
2012	Paanch Adhyay	Phire Paoar Gaan	Solo	Shantanu Moitra	Bengali Film
2012	Oh My God!	Tu Hi Tu (Unplugged)	Solo	Himesh Reshammiya	
2012	Rush	Chup Chup Ke	Muazzam, Rizwan Ali Khan	Pritam	
2012	Rush	Hote Hote	Hard Kaur	Pritam	
2012	Bojhena Shey Bojhena	Kothin	Sayani Ghosh	Arindom Chatterjee	Bengali Film
2013	Shortcut Romeo	Shortcut Romeo	Solo	Himesh Reshammiya	
2013	Baat Bann Gayi	Naseeba	Solo	Harpreet Singh	
2013	Baat Bann Gayi	Dance Karna	Sardar Ali	Harpreet Singh	
2013	Sooper Se Ooper	Behka Behka	Teesha Nigam	Sonu Nigam & Bickram Ghosh	
2014	Heartless	Mashooqana	Arunima Bhattacharya	Gaurav Dagaonkar	
2014	Savaari 2	Yello Mareyaagi	Solo	Manikanth Kadri	Kannada Film
2014	Humshakals	Look into My Eyes	Neeti Mohan	Himesh Reshammiya	
2014	Bang Bang!	Meherbaan	Shilpa Rao, Shekhar Ravjiani	Vishal–Shekhar	
2015	I	Tum Todo Naa (Male version)	Sunidhi Chauhan	A. R. Rahman	
2015	I	Tum Todo Naa (Female version)	Bela Shende	A. R. Rahman	
2015	Parbona Ami Chartey Tokey	Ure Geche	Monali Thakur	Indradeep Dasgupta	Bengali Film
2015	Shudhu Tomari Jonyo	Jeno Tomari Kache	Somlata Acharyya Chowdhury	Arindom Chatterjee	Bengali Film
2015	Shudhu Tomari Jonyo	Dekhte Bou Bou	Prashmita Paul	Arindom Chatterjee	Bengali Film
2015	Drishyam	Carbon Copy	Solo	Vishal Bhardwaj	
2016	Hero 420	Chaichi Toke	Solo	Savvy Gupta	Indo-Bangladesh Film
2016	Prem Ki Bujhini	Ami Raji	Madhubanti Bagchi	Savvy Gupta	Indo-Bangladesh Film
2016	Ae Dil Hai Mushkil	Alizeh	Arijit Singh	Pritam	
2016	Saansein	Mera Pyar	Arijit Singh, Swati Sharma, Dev Negi, Joi Barua	Vivek Kar	
2016	Ami Tomar Hote Chai	Ei Tukro Premer Golpo	Solo	Shafiq Tuhin	Bangladeshi Film
2016	Fever		Solo		
2016	Kahaani 2: Durga Rani Singh	Aur Main Khush Hoon	Solo	Clinton Cerejo	
2017	Half Girlfriend	Baarish	Shashaa Tirupati	Tanishk Bagchi	
2017	Ami Je Ke Tomar	Bhalobeshe Felech	Jonita Gandhi	Indradeep Dasgupta	Bengali film
2017	Flat 211	Chocolatey Cake	Solo	Prakash Prabhakar	
2017	A Gentleman	Bandook Meri Laila	Jigar Saraiya, Rap: Raftaar, Sidharth Malhotra	Sachin–Jigar	
2017	Guest iin London	Dil Mera	Shahid Mallya, Prakriti Kakar	Raghav Sachar	
2017	Tu Hai Mera Sunday	Yeh Mera Mann	Solo	Amartya Bobo Rahut	
2018	Stree	Nazar Na Lag Jaaye	Solo	Sachin–Jigar	
2019	Pal Pal Dil Ke Paas	Ho Ja Awara	Monali Thakur	Tanishk Bagchi	
2020	Coolie No. 1	Tere Siva	Renessa Das	Tanishk Bagchi	Amazon Prime Video film
2020	Kaamyaab	Paaon Bhari	Solo	Rachita Arora	
2020	Ludo	Meri Tum Ho	Jubin Nautiyal	Pritam	Netflix film
2020	Ludo	Meri Tum Ho (Unplugged)	Jubin Nautiyal	Pritam	Netflix film
2021	Radhe	Zoom Zoom	Iulia Vantur	Sajid–Wajid	Zee5 film
2022	Raavan	You Are My Love	Solo	Savvy Gupta	Bengali film
2022	Bhediya	Thumkeshwari	Rashmeet Kaur, Divya Kumar, Sachin-Jigar	Sachin-Jigar	
2022	Maja Ma	Ae pagli	Prakriti Kakkar	Gourov Dasgupta	Amazon Prime Video film
2023	Chatrapathi	Sukhriya	Palak Muchhal	Tanishk Bagchi	
2024	Merry Christmas	Merry Christmas Title Track	Solo	Pritam	
2025	Surprise	Surprise Title Track	Solo	Abhijit Vaghani	Gujarati Film, Lyrics - Maulin Parmar

== Non-film ==
- Look For Me
- Take It Easy
- Love Is Blind
- Bad Romance Remix from Lady Gaga Just Dance Album with Lady Gaga, Lush, Wedis and Young Thoro
- Deewaren: Unity Song for Holi ("Deewaren" along with Sukhwinder Singh, Shaan, Javed Ali, Suraj Jagan, Kunal Ganjawala, Jonita Gandhi) (Single Holy song by The Moody Nation)
- Revels, 2017 at Manipal Institute of Technology.
- Kishmish, with QARAN & Momina Mustehsan
- Haaye Oye – QARAN ft. Ash King
- Oriplast Originals (Ami Shudhu Tomar along with Ajay Singha) (Bengali Album)
- Slowly Slowly - Tannerwell & Ash King

== Accolades ==
Award Ceremony	Category	Nominated work	Result	Ref.(s)
10th Mirchi Music Awards	Male Vocalist of The Year	"Baarish" from Half Girlfriend	Nominated	
