= Chuttamalle =

2024 song by Anirudh Ravichander, Ramajogayya Sastry and Shilpa Rao

- Official song cover

Single by Anirudh Ravichander and Ramajogayya Sastry featuring Shilpa Rao

from the album Devara: Part 1
- Language: Telugu
- Released: 5 August 2024
- Studio: Albuquerque Records, Chennai
- Genre: Dance; popular; soft rock
- Length: 3:42
- Label: Super Cassettes Industries Private Limited
- Composer: Anirudh Ravichander
- Lyricist: Ramajogayya Sastry
- Producer: Anirudh Ravichander

Devara: Part 1 track listing
- 1. "Fear Song"; 2. "Chuttamalle"; 3. "Daavudi"; 4. "Ayudha Pooja"

Music video
- "Chuttamalle" on YouTube

"Chuttamalle" is an Indian Telugu-language song composed by Anirudh Ravichander, with lyrics by Ramajogayya Sastry, and recorded by Shilpa Rao, for the soundtrack album of the 2024 film Devara: Part 1. It was released on 5 August 2024 (released on YouTube as a lyrical video song) as the second single from the album, through T-Series. The full video song, featuring scenes directly from the film, was released on 26 October 2024 on YouTube.

"Chuttamalle" experienced large amounts of commercial and critical success due to the vocals by Shilpa Rao, music composition by Anirudh Ravichander and the dance steps choreographed by Bosco Martis.

The song was also released in Hindi, Tamil, Malayalam and Kannada languages with the title "Dheere Dheere", "Paththavaikkum", "Kanninathan Kamanottam" and "Swaathimutthe Sikkangaithe" respectively, and was included in the respective dubbed versions of the film. The Hindi and Tamil versions were also successful along with the original version.

== Production, lyrics and recording ==
Shilpa Rao has collaborated with Anirudh Ravichander for the third time after "Chaleya" (from Hindi film Jawan) and "Kaavaalaa" (from Tamil film Jailer). She has recorded the song in Hindi, Malayalam and Kannada languages along with the original Telugu version. Deepthi Suresh has recorded the song in Tamil language. Unlike the other songs from the soundtrack, "Chuttamalle" is a romantic melody that is presented from the perspective of the female lead (Janhvi Kapoor).

== Controversies ==
=== Alleged music copying ===
The song was compared with the Sri Lankan song "Manike Mage Hithe" for the similar instrumental arrangements and compositions. Anirudh received significant criticism over the music plagiarism. Acknowledging the issue, original composer, Chamath Sangeeth, has responded through social media and wrote: "Always been an admirer of Anirudh’s work. I’m happy to see my song ‘Manike Mage Hithe’ has inspired him to create something similar". Anirudh Ravichander, Ramajogayya Sastry and Shilpa Rao have not responded to the controversy.

=== AI-generated explicit deepfake ===
In October 2026, an altered video using footage of Janhvi Kapoor from the song circulated online, depicting sexually explicit content that was not part of the original song. The incident prompted strong condemnation from Janhvi, Jr NTR, and other celebrities. Janhvi described the misuse of AI as a violation of consent and personal boundaries. The controversy concerns the unauthorized manipulation of her likeness, not the original romantic song itself.

== Critical reception ==
Calling it a "glamorous number", Telugucinema.com praised Anirudh's work with a particular praise for Shilpa Rao's vocals. India Today appreciated Shilpa Rao's vocals and the dance sequences writing that "The choreography, crafted by Bosco Martis, enhances the song's appeal, featuring dance moves that perfectly complement the song's sensual vibe", while also praising the performance of the lead cast in the music video. Pratyusha Sista of Telangana Today wrote in her review that the song "composed by Anirudh Ravichander, with lyrics penned by Ramajogayya Sastry and vocals by Shilpa Rao, promises to be a chartbuster". Cinema Express called it a "sultry yet playful love song".

== Music video ==
=== Background and production ===
As part of the film's production, the scenes involved in the music video of the song were shot in Krabi, Thailand. The scenes were shot in June 2024 after completing a schedule in Goa.

Bosco Martis has choreographed the dance sequences.

=== Synopsis ===
The music video is a direct clip from the scenes in Devara: Part 1. The scenes feature N. T. Rama Rao Jr and Janhvi Kapoor.

== Credits and personnel ==
Credits adapted from YouTube.

- Anirudh Ravichander – composer, keyboard, synth and rhythm
- Ramajogayya Sastry – lyrics
- Shilpa Rao – vocals
- Bosco Martis – choreography
- Keba Jeremiah – electric & acoustic guitar and charango
- Ananthakrrishnan – solo violin and music advisor
- Shashank Vijay – rhythm producer
- Karthik Vamsi – additional rhythm and percussions programmer
- Arish – additional keyboard programmer
- Beven – additional keyboard programmer
- Narendar S – additional keyboard programmer
- Sajith Satya – creative consultant
- Srinivasan M – engineer and mix engineer
- Shivakiran S – engineer
- Vinay Sridhar – mix engineer
- Luca Pretolesi – mastering engineer
- Alistair – assistant mastering engineer
- Velavan B – music coordinator

== Charts ==
Weekly chat performance for "Chuttamalle"
Chart (2024)	Peak position
India (Billboard) ("Dheere Dheere")	4
India (Billboard) ("Chuttamalle")	18
UK Asian Music Chart (OCC) ("Chuttamalle")	5
UK Asian Music Chart (OCC) ("Paththavaikkum")	20
UK Asian Music Chart (OCC) ("Dheere Dheere")	21
