= Mia Mont =

- Born: November 3, 1989 (age 36); Lima, Peru,
- Occupations: Singer, songwriter
- Years active: 2009–present
- Height: 178 cm (5 ft 10 in)

Mia Emperatriz Montoya Horna, also known as Mia Mont (born November 3, 1989, in Lima, Peru) is a singer and songwriter who is of Peruvian origin. Mia is popular for singing the Spanish version of 'Dhoom Machale' song in Dhoom 3.

== Career ==
Mont worked on her first album of hand with Ed Montoya, composing the first songs of their debut album Antifantasía with a team formed by music producer Ed Montoya. Percy Céspedez (Adammo, Gian Marco, TK) was the director of her first video, "For Him", and later her second single "Looking". In 2010 "For Him" reached the top spot on various music channels like MTV Latin American and Latino Ritmonson.

On December 31, 2010, Mont was chosen by Radio Studio 92 as "Artist female revelation" and their debut song "For him," was awarded Best Made Song in Peru in 2010. In early 2011, the theme was included in the telenovela Lalola, Channel Frequency America. Mont performed at the Billboard Latin Music Conference on April 26, 2011

== Discography ==
- 2010: Antifantasía
- 2012: Antifantasía: Deluxe Edition
- 2013: Dhoom Machale (Dhoom 3)

== Awards and nominations ==
Year	Competition	Category	Work	Result
2011	RadioCAN	Best Song		Nominated
2011	HTV	Best New Artist Award		Won

- Selected Radio Studio 92, Female Breakthrough Artist.
- Nominated for Artist of 2011, Record Report.
