= Meherbaan (song) =

- Cover of the song, featuring actors Hrithik Roshan and Katrina Kaif

Single by Ash King, Shilpa Rao and Shekhar Ravjiani

from the album Bang Bang! soundtrack
- Released: 6 September 2014
- Recorded: 2013
- Studio: Vishal & Shekhar's Studio, Bandra, Mumbai
- Genre: Filmi
- Length: 5:07
- Label: Zee Music Company
- Songwriters: Anvita Dutt and Kumaar
- Producer: Abhijit Nalani

Shilpa Rao singles chronology
"Malang" (2013)	"Meherbaan" (2014)	"Projapoti Mon (From "Projapoti Biskut")" (2017)

Shekhar Ravjiani singles chronology
"Butterfly" (2013)	"Meherbaan" (2014)	"Shekhar Ravjiani's Hanuman Chalisa" (2014)

Music video
- "Meherbaan" on YouTube

"Meherbaan" (transl. Benevolence) is a Hindi song from the 2014 Hindi film, Bang Bang!. Composed by the duo Vishal–Shekhar (Vishal Dadlani and Shekhar Ravjiani), the song is sung by Ash King, Shilpa Rao and Ravjiani, with lyrics penned by Anvita Dutt and Kumaar. The music video of the soft and melodic track features actors Hrithik Roshan and Katrina Kaif.

== Development ==
The song was recorded at Vishal–Shekhar's Studio in Bandra, Mumbai by recording engineers, Satchith Harve and Abhishek Ghatak with the tune being mixed by Praveen Muralidhar at Studio Nysa and mastering done by Shadab Rayeen at New Edge, New York. The song is produced by Abhijit Nalani. Live Acoustic Guitars is given by Sanjoy Das and Keba Jeremiah while live Percussions is provided by Aatur Soni and Suresh Soni.

"I got an unexpected message from Vishal Dadlani [...] on a social networking site, asking if I could record a song for him. I recorded it, but I thought I had failed, and left. The next day, he called me saying he wanted to record it again. He explained that Meherbaan was about two lovers in the Mediterranean region, and that Hrithik (Roshan) and Katrina (Kaif) would be in the film. When I sang it, I sang it in a very personal way, like I am singing a song to a person and not to an audience."

— Ash King, vocalist.

Dadlani is credited as backing vocals while the chorus features voice by Suzanne D'Mello, Thomson Andrews, Keshia Braganza, Allan deSouza, Leon De Souza, Gwen Dias, and Gary Misquitta. The song was the first song recorded and completed from the film. Singer of the song Ash King was in England when he was offered by Dadlani to record the song.

In July 2013, shooting for the song started in the city of Santorini in Greece. Shooting for the song was completed over a week. The opening sequence of the song was shot at Galleraki cocktail bar in Mykonos by the blue waters of the Aegean Sea. This song marks the first time actress Katrina Kaif visits Greece. She even considered this song to be one her finest romantic songs. The song is choreographed by Ahmed Khan, while styling for the song is done by Anaita Shroff Adajania.

== Release ==
The first look of the song was released on 2 September 2014. The music video of the song was officially released on 3 September 2014, through the YouTube channel of Zee Music Company. The full song was later released on music-streaming platforms on 6 September 2014.

The song received more than 2 million views in less than 4 days of its release, and over 3 million hits within 6 days.

== Critical reception ==
Kasmin Fernandes reviewing for The Times of India praised the composition by Vishal–Shekhar stating that "the faultless guitar-driven composition make it another glowing standout". Joginder Tuteja from Rediff.com who felt the song is "a complete contrast", praised Shilpa Rao and stated someone other than Ash King would have been a better choice for Hrithik (Roshan)'s voice. Surabhi Redkar from Koimoi stated "Meherbaan has amazing guitar pieces and the soulful voices of Ash King and Shilpa Rao blend perfectly into it".

== Reprise version ==
The soundtrack of the album consists of a reprise version of the song sung by Shekhar Ravjiani, who also rendered a part of the song in the original. Acoustics for the version is provided by Sanjoy Das (Bapi) and Keba Jeremiah. Rajiv Vijayakar reviewing for Bollywood Hungama stated, "Of the two versions of 'Meherbaan' we preferred the solo Shekhar Rajviani reprise over the Ash King-Shilpa Rao-Shekhar Ravjiani one, though we preferred the reprise version by alone".

== Track listing ==
No.	Title	Lyrics	Singer(s)	Length
1.	"Meherbaan"	Anvita Dutt, Kumaar	Ash King, Shilpa Rao, Shekhar Ravjiani	05:07
2.	"Meherbaan (Reprise Version)"	Anvita Dutt, Kumaar	Shekhar Ravjiani	03:01
3.	"Pavanmaai (Tamil Version)"	Madhan Karky	Ash King, Anusha Mani	05:07
4.	"Priyathama (Telugu Version)"	K Subhas Chandrabose	Ash King, Shilpa Rao	05:07
