= Siddharth Mahadevan =

Indian singer and composer

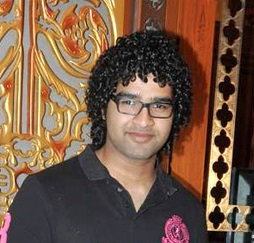
- Mahadevan at 'royalty issue meet' event in 2014
- Born: 16 April 1993 (age 33); India
- Occupations: Composer; Singer; Actor
- Father: Shankar Mahadevan
- Musical career
- Genres: Indian Rock; Bollywood
- Instrument: Vocals
- Years active: 2011–present

Siddharth Mahadevan is an Indian film composer who is known for his songs in the film Bhaag Milkha Bhaag in which he sang "Zinda" and the rock version of the title song "Bhaag Milkha Bhaag".

== Career ==
Mahadevan got further acclaim for the song, "Malang", in Dhoom 3, by music director Pritam. He has also composed music for the Marathi films, Swapna Tujhe ni Majhe and Sugar Salt Ani Prem, with his cousin, Soumil Shringarpure. Additionally, he sang "Nachde Ne Sare" in Baar Baar Dekho.

On 12 October 2019, he performed for the Army officers at Fort William, Kolkata, West Bengal. GOC Eastern Command, Chief of Staff, Eastern Command and other officers and soldiers were present.

== Personal life ==
He is the son of Shankar Mahadevan, a film music composer and playback singer from India.

== Filmography ==
=== As composer ===
| Year | Film | Language | Notes |
|---|---|---|---|
| 2012 | Swapna Tujhe Ni Majhe | Marathi | Debut as Music Director |
| 2012 | Midnight's Children | Hindi | |
| 2015 | Welcome Zindagi | Marathi | With his cousin Soumil Shringarpure |
| 2015 | Sugar Salt Ani Prem | Marathi | |
| 2015 | The Perfect Girl | Hindi | |
| 2015 | Sata Lota Pan Sagla Khota | Marathi | With his cousin Soumil Shringarpure and Aditya Bedekar |
| 2018 | Bogda | Marathi | With his cousin Soumil Shringarpure |
| 2022 | Maja Ma | Hindi | With his cousin Soumil Shringarpure |
| 2025 | Tu Bol Na | Marathi | With his cousin Soumil Shringarpure |

=== As playback singer ===
Hindi film songs
| Film | Year | Song | Composer(s) | Writer(s) | Co-singer(s) |
|---|---|---|---|---|---|
| Bunty Aur Babli | 2005 | "Bunty Aur Babli" | Shankar–Ehsaan–Loy | Gulzar | Shankar Mahadevan, Sukhwinder Singh, Jaspinder Narula |
| Bhaag Milkha Bhaag | 2013 | "Zinda" | Shankar–Ehsaan–Loy | Prasoon Joshi | |
| Bhaag Milkha Bhaag | 2013 | "Bhaag Milkha Bhaag" (Rock Version) | Shankar–Ehsaan–Loy | Prasoon Joshi | |
| D-Day | 2013 | "Dhuaan" | Shankar–Ehsaan–Loy | Niranjan Iyengar | Rahul Ram, Alyssa Mendonsa |
| Dhoom 3 | 2013 | "Malang" | Pritam | Sameer | Shilpa Rao |
| One by Two | 2014 | "I'm Just Pakaoed" | Shankar–Ehsaan–Loy | Amitabh Bhattacharya | |
| 2 States | 2014 | "Hulla Re" | Shankar–Ehsaan–Loy | Amitabh Bhattacharya | Shankar Mahadevan, Rasika Shekar |
| Kill Dil | 2014 | "Bol Beliya" | Shankar–Ehsaan–Loy | Gulzar | Sunidhi Chauhan, Shankar Mahadevan |
| Dil Dhadakne Do | 2015 | "Pehli Baar" | Shankar–Ehsaan–Loy | Javed Akhtar | Sukriti Kakar |
| Katti Batti | 2015 | "Sarfira" | Shankar–Ehsaan–Loy | Kumaar | Neeti Mohan, Shankar Mahadevan |
| Puli (D) | 2015 | "Ladhjaa" | Devi Sri Prasad | Raqueeb Alam | |
| Baar Baar Dekho | 2016 | "Nachde Ne Saare" | Jasleen Royal | Aditya Sharma | Jasleen Royal, Harshdeep Kaur |
| Mirzya | 2016 | "Teen Gawah" | Shankar–Ehsaan–Loy | Gulzar | Sain Zahoor |
| Ghayal Once Again | 2016 | "Lapak Jhapak" | Shankar–Ehsaan–Loy | Amitabh Bhattacharya | Armaan Malik |
| Munna Michael | 2017 | "Main Hoon" | Tanishk Bagchi | Kumaar | |
| Fukrey Returns | 2017 | "Fukrey Returns" | Gulraj Singh | Kumaar | |
| Manikarnika: The Queen of Jhansi | 2019 | "Dankila" | Shankar–Ehsaan–Loy | Prasoon Joshi | Prajakta Shukre, Shrinidhi Ghatate, Arunaja, Chotu Singh Rawna, Hemant Brijwasi |
| Chhapaak | 2020 | "Nok Jhok" | Shankar–Ehsaan–Loy | Gulzar | |
| Bunty Aur Babli 2 | 2021 | "Bunty Aur Babli - Title Track" | Shankar–Ehsaan–Loy | Amitabh Bhattacharya | Bohemia |
| Toofaan | 2021 | "Toofaan - Title Track" | Shankar-Ehsaan-Loy | Javed Akhtar | Siddharth Mahadevan |
| Vikram (D) | 2022 | "Vikram Title Track" | Anirudh | Raqueeb Alam | |
| Dono | 2023 | "Aag Lagdi" | Shankar-Ehsaan-Loy | Irshad Kamil | Lisa Mishra |

Regional songs
| Film | Year | Song | Language | Composer(s) | Writer(s) | Co-singer(s) |
|---|---|---|---|---|---|---|
| Swapna Tujhe Ni Majhe | 2012 | "Jhale Gele Visarave" | Marathi | Siddharth Mahadevan and Soumil Shringarpure | | |
| Race Gurram | 2014 | "Sweety" | Telugu | S. Thaman | Varikuppala Yadagiri | Rabbit Mac |
| Happy New Year (D) | 2014 | "India Waale (Telugu Version)" | Telugu | Vishal–Shekhar | Snehan | Shankar Mahadevan, Rajiv Sundaresan, Raman Mahadevan, Neeti Mohan |
| Vadacurry | 2014 | "Ullangayil Ennai Vaithu" | Tamil | Vivek-Mervin | Snehan | |
| Chirakodinja Kinavukal | 2015 | "Omale Aromale" | Malayalam | Deepak Dev | B K Harinarayanan | Manjari |
| Chirakodinja Kinavukal | 2015 | "Hey Kannil Nokkathe" | Malayalam | Deepak Dev | B K Harinarayanan | Gayathri Suresh |
| Mitwaa | 2015 | "Satyam Shivam Sundaram" | Marathi | Shankar–Ehsaan–Loy | Mandar Cholkar | |
| Sata Lota Pan Sagla Khota | 2015 | "Halla Karuya" | Marathi | Siddharth Mahadevan and Soumil Shringarpure | Shrirang Godbole | Shankar Mahadevan, Prakriti Kakar |
| Sugar Salt Ani Prem | 2015 | "Disha Milali Aaj" | Marathi | Siddharth Mahadevan | Mandar Cholkar | Akriti Kakar |
| Urfi | 2015 | "Dhanak Dhanak" | Marathi | Chinar - Mahesh | Mangesh Kangane | |
| Eetti | 2015 | "Oru Thuli" | Tamil | G.V. Prakash Kumar | | |
| Guru | 2017 | "Ukku Naram" | Telugu | Santosh Narayanan | Ramajogayya Sastry | |
| Guru | 2017 | "Ne Zara" | Telugu | Santosh Narayanan | Sri Mani | |
| Velaikkaran | 2017 | "Ezhu Velaikkara" | Tamil | Anirudh Ravichander | Viveka | |
| "Semma" | 2018 | " Nenje Nenje" | Tamil | G.V. Prakash Kumar | Yugabharathi | |
| Bogda | 2018 | "Zhumbad" | Marathi | Siddharth Mahadevan, Soumil Shringarpure | Manndar Cholkar | |
| Padde Huli | 2019 | Baduku Jataka Bandi" | Kannada | B. Ajaneesh Loknath | | |
| Padde Huli | 2019 | Heli Hogu Kaarana" | Kannada | B. Ajaneesh Loknath | B. R. Lakshman Rao | Gubbi |
| Saaho | 2019 | "Baby Won't You Tell Me" | Telugu | Shankar–Ehsaan–Loy | Manoj Yadav | Shankar Mahadevan, Shweta Mohan |
| Chatha Pacha | 2025 | "Chatha Pacha Title Track" | Malayalam | Shankar–Ehsaan–Loy | Vinayak Sasikumar | Shankar Mahadevan, Fejo |

=== Other projects ===
- Siddharth Mahadevan composed a jingle for RADIO CITY'S kasakay Mumbai
- He also composed a jingle for DISCOVERY TLC's Chew
- He sang the title song for the webseries Life Sahi Hai

== Awards ==
| Year | Category | Nominated Song | Film | Result | Ref |
|---|---|---|---|---|---|
Filmfare Awards
| 2014 | Best Male Playback Singer | "Zinda" | Bhaag Milkha Bhaag | Nominated | |
| 2014 | RD Burman Award for New Music Talent | "Zinda" | Bhaag Milkha Bhaag | Won | |
International Indian Film Academy Awards
| 2014 | Best Male Playback Singer | "Zinda" | Bhaag Milkha Bhaag | Nominated | |
Screen Awards
| 2014 | Best Male Playback Singer | "Zinda" | Bhaag Milkha Bhaag | Nominated | |
Star Guild Awards
| 2014 | Best Male Playback Singer | "Malang" | Dhoom 3 | Nominated | |
BIG Star Entertainment Awards
| 2013 | Most Entertaining Male Singer | "Zinda" (tied with Yo Yo Honey Singh for Lungi Dance) | Bhaag Milkha Bhaag | Won | |
Mirchi Music Awards
| 2014 | Male Vocalist of the Year | "Zinda" | Bhaag Milkha Bhaag | Nominated | |
