= Shilpa Rao =

Indian singer (born 1984)

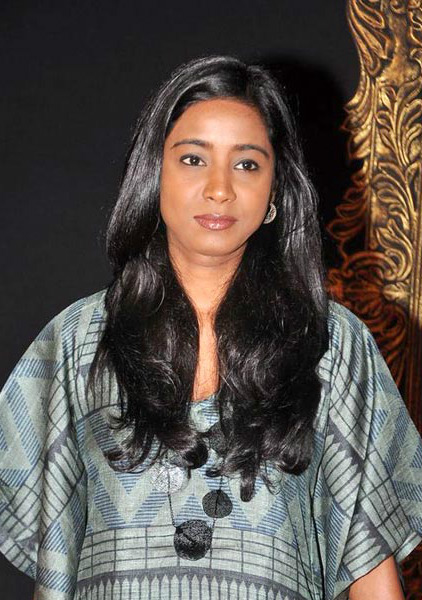
- Rao in 2012

Background information
- Born: Apeksha Rao; 11 April 1984 (age 42); Jamshedpur, Bihar (present–day Jharkhand), India
- Occupation: Indian Playback singer
- Years active: 2003–present
- Spouse: Ritesh Krishnan (m. 2021)

Shilpa Rao (born Apeksha Rao; 11 April 1984) is an Indian playback singer known for her versatile and unconventional vocal style, deeply rooted in Hindustani classical music. She primarily records in the Hindi, Telugu, and Tamil languages. Raised in Jamshedpur, Rao completed her postgraduate studies in applied statistics in Mumbai before embarking on a professional career in music. After initial training under her father, S. Venkat Rao, and the renowned classical musician Ustad Ghulam Mustafa Khan, she made her Bollywood debut in 2007 with the song "Tose Naina" (also known as "Javeda Zindagi") from the film Anwar, composed by Mithoon.

Rao rose to widespread prominence with the release of "Woh Ajnabee" from The Train (2007) and "Khuda Jaane" from Bachna Ae Haseeno (2008), the latter of which earned her a nomination for the Filmfare Award for Best Female Playback Singer. The following year, she collaborated with Ilaiyaraaja for Paa (2009), where she performed the song "Mudi Mudi Ittefaq Se" which earned her a second Filmfare nomination in the same category. In 2012, Rao teamed up with A. R. Rahman for the song "Ishq Shava" for Yash Chopra's swan song Jab Tak Hai Jaan, followed by Pritam's "Malang" from Dhoom 3 (2013) and Vishal–Shekhar's "Meherbaan" from Bang Bang! (2014). Rao's collaborations with Amit Trivedi were also acclaimed with songs such as "Manmarziyaan" from Lootera (2013) receiving particular praise. She was the final Indian singer to perform in Coke Studio Pakistan with the song "Paar Chanaa De" (2016) and received praise for singing the song "Aaj Jaane Ki Zid Na Karo" from the deluxe edition of the Ae Dil Hai Mushkil soundtrack (2016)."Ghungroo" from War (2019; Hindi), "Besharam Rang" from Pathaan (2023; Hindi), "Kaavaalaa" from Jailer (2023; Tamil), "Chaleya" from Jawan (2023; Hindi) and "Chuttamalle" from Devara: Part 1 (2024; Telugu) were her most commercially successful songs.Rao is particularly known in the media for trying new styles in her songs and singing for different genres. Rao, who considers her father as her biggest inspiration in the music career, has supported charitable organisations for a number of causes.

== Early life ==
Shilpa Rao was born on 11 April 1984 in Jamshedpur, India into a Telugu family and a native of Vizianagaram, Andhra Pradesh. Rao was initially named as Apeksha Rao but later changed to Shilpa Rao. According to her, she relates to the name Shilpa more, since the name has "to do with art". She started singing while she was a kid, tutored and instructed by her father, S Venkat Rao, who holds a degree in music. He taught Rao to understand the "nuances" of different ragas: "His method of teaching was casual and at the same time very effective because it was designed to pique my interest". For her education, Rao went to Little Flower School and Loyola School, Jamshedpur, where she was part of the choir group in school. In 1997, she visited to Mumbai along with her family, to do a postgraduate diploma in statistics from the University of Mumbai.

Rao was motivated to be a singer upon meeting with Hariharan, at the age of 13, and commenced training under Ustad Ghulam Mustafa Khan, insisted by Hariharan. Initially, she found herself struggling in "finding references" and meeting music composers since she was not "so active" in social networking media during the time. About her early days in the city, Rao said: "Jamshedpur is home for me but Mumbai with the people, the place, the pace everything has made a more patient person and a more hardworking artist I could ever be". In 2001 she began performing live with Hariharan at different venues, subsequently winning a national-level talent hunt in New Delhi. Shankar Mahadevan–one of the judges in the contest–asked her to settle in Mumbai.

In 2004, she shifted to Mumbai and completed Post Graduation in Applied Statistics from St. Xavier's College, Mumbai. Mahadevan gave Rao few contacts of people who helped her in getting to sing jingles. Rao mentioned that singing jingles was "perhaps the best way" to start in Mumbai as it helped her making the best contacts in the studios. She worked as a jingle singer for three years and established a life of her own. She sang songs for products such as Cadbury's Munch, Sunsilk, Anchor Gel and No Marks.

== Career ==
=== 2007–08: Career beginnings and Bachna Ae Haseeno ===
While Rao was studying at college, she met with Mithoon, who called her for recording of the song "Tose Naina" from Anwar (2007). Considering the song as her "most innocent rendition" she had done, Rao said, "This song is extremely close to my heart and has taught me what thrill and gratitude of music is and can be". Though Rao credits "Tose Naina" as her career debut song, the soundtrack of the film Ek Ajnabee (2005) has a semi-instrumental track titled "Stranger On The Prowl" which has Rao's alap incorporated within it. She collaborated with Mithoon in two other projects during the year; Aggar and The Train. Though "Sehra" from the former met with negative reactions from music critics, both "Woh Ajnabee" and "Teri Tamanna" from the latter were well received; Raja Sen from Rediff.com praising Rao's "strong vocals" in particular. While shooting for Salaam-e-Ishq, music composer Shankar Mahadevan from the trio Shankar–Ehsaan–Loy suggested Rao's name to director Nikhil Advani, thus landing the song "Saiyaan Re". Sukanya Verma who praised Rao's "perfectly impish delivery" of the song wrote: "Despite Mahadevan's dynamic presence, [Rao], to watch out for, is never once intimidated". She again teamed up with Shankar–Ehsaan–Loy for the Hindi version of the track "All For One" from the soundtrack of High School Musical 2.

Rao's first release of 2008 came with Raghav Sachar-composed remix version of "Gup Chup" from One Two Three, followed by "Ek Lau" from Aamir, composed by Amit Trivedi. According to Rao, "Ek Lau" was a song of "hope for many people for the 26/11 Mumbai attacks". She affirmed that the song will inspire people and picked "Ek Lau" as one of the "few compositions" that is "close" to her. Apart from rendering "Main Sajda" for Anu Malik in Good Luck!, she was heard in a "faint alaap" at the beginning of the song "Koi Na Jaane" from Hijack, along with KK. The duo also collaborated during the year, in Vishal–Shekhar's "Khuda Jaane" from Bachna Ae Haseeno. Rao, calling the song a "timeless classic", felt it was beautifully composed and written. She mentioned that she feels "fortunate to be a part" of the song. "Khuda Jaane" earned Rao her first nomination for the Filmfare Award for Best Female Playback Singer.

=== 2009–12: Paa and Jab Tak Hai Jaan ===
Rao, a friend of music composer Amit Trivedi, introduced him to Anurag Kashyap, director of the film Dev.D (2009) who was searching for a new composer with a "distinct vision" for his film. The song, "Dhol Yaara Dhol" from the soundtrack of the film was recorded three years ago, "free of cost". She was next heard in Piyush Mishra-composed Gulaal, where she performed the track "Aisi Sazaa". Sen from Rediff.com credited Rao's "distinctively dulcet tones" for making the song a memorable track. After recording "Manzaraat" from Sikandar, Rao performed the track "Mudi Mudi Ittefaq Se" for Ilaiyaraaja's Paa. She described the song as the "most difficult experience" and believed that lyrics and "musical bounces" in the song was a "test" in proving her versatility. The song garnered positive response from critics; Chandrima Pal from Rediff.com picked the track as the "most significant song of the album". The soundtrack album had another track titled "Udi Udi Ittefaq Se" by Rao, with slight variations in the arrangements and lyrics. "Mudi Mudi Ittefaq Se" garnered her second nomination for the Filmfare Award for Best Female Playback Singer. In 2010, Rao collaborated with Pritam for the first time, and performed "Ittefaq Tu Nahin" for Mallika and "Dil Le Jaa" for Toh Baat Pakki!. She again teamed up with Trivedi for Admissions Open and Vishal–Shekhar for Anjaana Anjaani. Though her previous releases during the year received mixed response from critics, "I Feel Good" and "Anjaana Anjaani" from the latter were positively received; Joginder Tuteja from Bollywood Hungama ascribed the "beauty of the songs" to Rao for holding fort and giving "good company" to her co-singers. She did playback for Bappi Lahiri in "Ankhiya Na Maar" of Apartment and performed two tracks for Lahore; Piyush Mishra's Sufi song "O Re Bande" and M.M. Kreem's Punjabi flavored "Rang De". The Times of India appraised the work of Rao in Lahore, since she tried performing different tracks within the same album. In the year, Rao made her Tamil music debut with the song "Oru Maalai Neram" from Yuvan Shankar Raja-composed Naan Mahaan Alla along with Javed Ali.

Rao's third collaboration with Pritam came along with the song "Allah Maaf Kare" from Desi Boyz (2011). She lent her voice for Trivedi in "Yeh Pal" from No One Killed Jessica, where NDTV noted that the song is "effectively voiced" by Rao. The year marks her first collaboration with Salim–Sulaiman, by recording "Jazba" from Ladies vs Ricky Bahl. During the year, she teamed up with Raghu Dixit as the composer and Ash King as the co-singer in "Uh-Oh Uh-Oh" from Mujhse Fraaandship Karoge. Rao collaborated with lyricist Neelesh Misra and composer Amartya Rahut and formed the Band Called Nine, which works for the traditional Indian craft of storytelling. During the year, they released their debut album, Rewind, consisting of songs and storytelling, put together with a narrative. Besides, Rao appeared in several TV series including MTV Unplugged and The Dewarists, where she performed acoustic versions for some of her previously released songs for the former and the song "I Believe" with Parikrama and Agnee for the latter. Rao considered MTV Unplugged "very challenging" to do since she had to create a totally different version of songs and "present it to people, who have heard it earlier and liked it".

After Ladies vs Ricky Bahl, Rao worked again with Salim–Sulaiman for "Jab Main Tumhare Saath Hun" from Jodi Breakers (2012). Tuteja reviewing the song from Bollywood Hungama perceived that she "deserves to be heard much more often". Apart from rendering "Yaariyaan" from Cocktail, Rao teamed up with Trivedi in two other films, Ek Main Aur Ekk Tu and English Vinglish. She received praise for her vocals in both films, particularly for "Aahatein" from the former, and the title track and "Gustakh Dil" from the latter; Jaspreet Pandohar from BBC Online regarded the title track as a "likeable listen" for Rao's "warm Hinglish" vocals. Tuteja complimenting the "charisma of her voice" in the song "Gustakh Dil" wrote: "Her voice carries a certain depth and edge to it that always makes one wonder why she isn't brought behind the mike far more often". The year concluded with Rao's collaboration with A. R. Rahman, by recording the track "Ishq Shava" from Jab Tak Hai Jaan, which was a fusion of Arabic and techno sounds. Shivi from Koimoi declared that the song proves Rao's versatility as a singer.

=== 2013–present: Lootera and Coke Studio ===
After Anwar and The Train, she collaborated once again with Mithoon for 3G (2013), where she performed "Khalbali" alongside Arijit Singh. She was part of the song "Apna Bombay Talkies" from Bombay Talkies which celebrated the 100th year of Indian cinema and the beginning of a new era in modern cinema. In the song, the singers recorded for actors whom they generally do the playback singing for, and Rao dubbed for Sonam Kapoor and Deepika Padukone. She next featured along with Sreeram Chandra for Pritam-composed "Subhanallah" from Yeh Jawaani Hai Deewani. Her next release, "Manmarziyaan" from Trivedi's Lootera was widely acclaimed by critics; while Filmfare's Devesh Sharma complimented Rao's "wistful rendering" in the song, Mohar Basu from Koimoi mentioned that she is "flawless" in her part. Her last release of the year was Pritam's "Malang" from Dhoom 3 along with Siddharth Mahadevan. According to Rao, "Malang" is unique and sets itself apart from other tracks because of the blend of "high energy and a Sufi touch".

Rao's first release of 2014 was Soumik Sen-composed "Gulaabi" from Gulaab Gang, followed by Vishal–Shekhar's "Meherbaan" from Bang Bang!. 2015, started with "Thode Se Hum" from Badmashiyaan, composed by Bobby–Imran. According to The Times of India, Rao rendered a "quieter female version" of the song with as much "soulfulness" as Mohit Chauhan does in his version. Similar was the case in her next release, the reprise version of "Le Chal Mujhe" from NH10, where she tried a "low octave" kind of voice texture for the song. Initially recorded to be a duet between Chauhan, it was later released as a solo by the two, and received positive reviews from critics for separate versions. Rucha Sharma from Daily News and Analysis affirmed that, Rao in her version "managed to outshine two most sought after singers, Chauhan and Singh". In 2016, Rao became the second Indian singer after Sharmistha Chatterjee who appeared with Mekaal Hasan Band, to have the honour of singing in the critically acclaimed musical show Coke Studio Pakistan. Rao made her debut with the folk-song "Paar Chanaa De", that aired in the fourth episode of the ninth season. Composed by the band Noori, the song narrates the story of a folk-tale Sohni Mahiwal. Rao described the song as "a theatrical saga because the song has emotion, anxiousness, longing to meet your loved one and hope. It's a folk song and the words are very hard hitting." Upon release, "Paar Chanaa De" received positive reviews. Srikanth Prabhu of The Express Tribune said that the song is "very different and gracing perfection in its own way." Sharing the experience, she said that "Coke Studio Pakistan is a place where all the musicians are in an environment where they have their instruments, their space and the freedom to choose anything and convey it to the people in their own style; it's very powerful."

In October 2026, during Rao's performance at the Bollywood Music Project festival, her performance was abruptly cut short amid scheduling delays and sound issues. After attempting to address the audience, she was interrupted, as the next performance by Kutle Khan began on an adjacent stage. The incident drew widespread backlash towards the management of the festival. Rao subsequently expressed her disappointment on social media, describing herself as "heartbroken" by the incident.

== Artistry ==
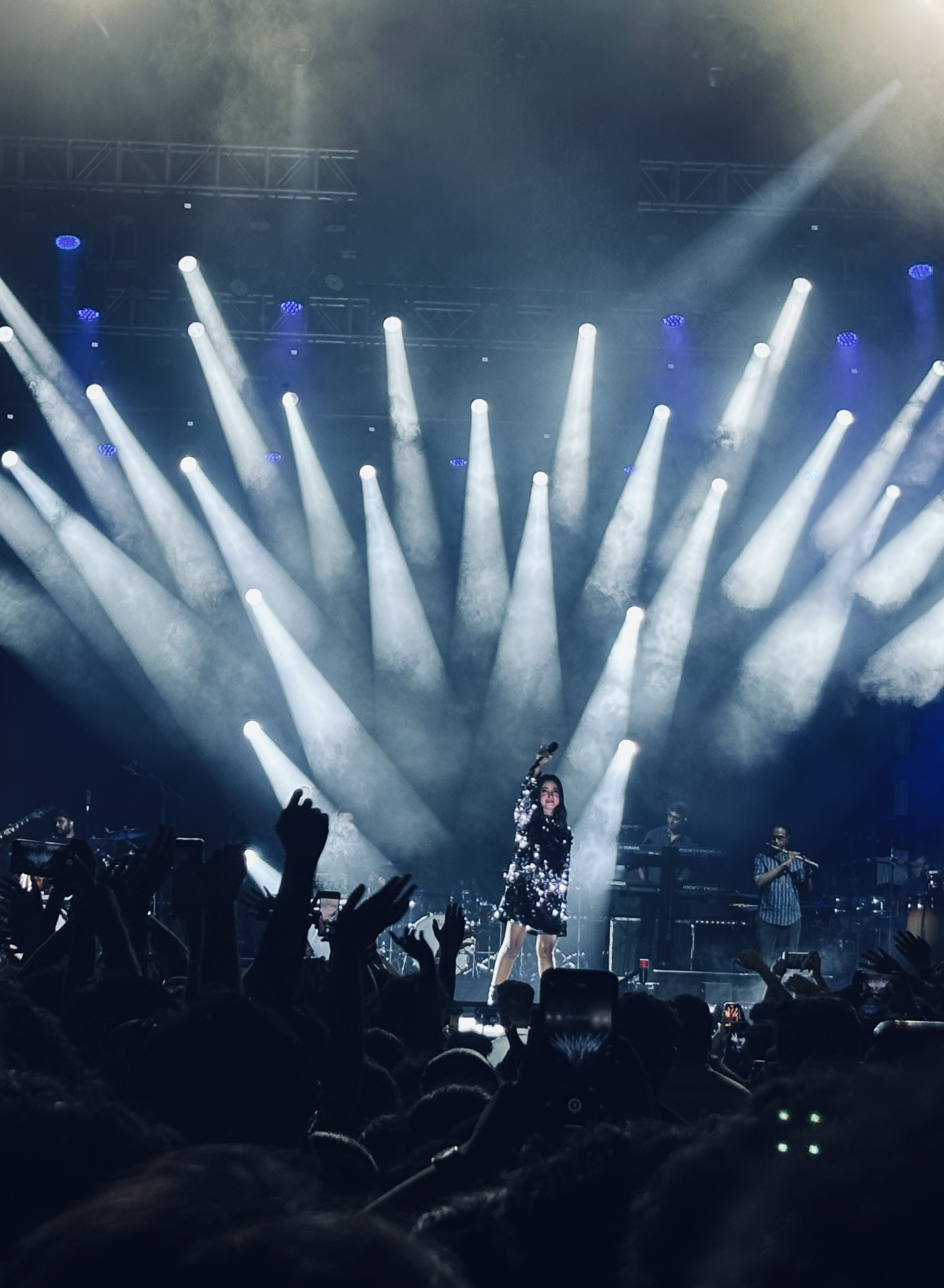
Shilpa performing in Calicut, c. 2024

=== Voice and musical style ===
Rao relates, singer's voice as his or her "own identity". The Times of India described her voice as "somber" yet "soulful". Deccan Herald mentioned that Rao has "enhanced" her reputation by modulating and experimenting with her voice. Rao often changes her vocal texture to express and relate the "way she wants to". In the song "Le Chal Mujhe" she tried a "low pitched" voice though "Malang" and "Meherbaan" represented an "open voice" of Rao. Bollywood Hungama's Rajiv Vijayakar in a review of "Malang" said: "Siddharth and Shilpa are made to sing in a welcome full-throated manner, and that is indeed a good change from Shilpa's trademark "closed" vocals". Rao believes, upbeat and classical-based beats are best suited for her kind of vocals.

As a kid, Rao dedicated most of her time in voice training. When her father comes back from work, they sit with the harmonium and tanpura and do their training together. According to Rao, her father follows a systematic training where the main focus is not on "just practicing the vocals", but about precision. As she grew up, she learnt how to place the vocals and how to protect the vocal chords from damage that might be caused by singing in the wrong pitch or by overusing. She works to maintain her vocal texture. She has a vocal tutor with whom she trains once a week to keep her vocals "fresh" and also try "newer textures".

Rao has not restricted herself to any particular genre while performing to music. She mentioned that she always tries a newer style in her song and has been open to all kinds of music. Rao grew up to ghazals, had a different taste of music while being on the choir group, subsequently moving into Rock music while in teens. "As you grow older, your taste in music changes. Now, I listen to everything; anything that makes me smile". She credited her music influences and training for the shaping of her voice and style of singing; "I have attempted diverse genres and have always tried to put out something new for audiences with every song". Mid-Day noted that though she has rendered a number of songs in various genres, it is difficult to "categorise" her voice.

=== Inspiration ===
Rao considered her father as her biggest inspiration since he has "exposed" her to good music, taught her to have "good judgement" and to "analyse what is good and what is not". While she was a kid, her father used to play songs of Ustad Amir Khan, Mehdi Hassan and Nusrat Fateh Ali Khan. It was then, Rao learned to appreciate Hassan's "perfect interpretation" of emotion and inspiring to learn his "effortless style" of singing. After moving to Mumbai, Rao was succoured by Hariharan and Shankar Mahadevan whom she considers her as "constant source of inspiration". Rao perceived that Hariharan has the perfect voice, training and vocal styling; further complimenting the work of Bombay Jayashri. After working with Pritam and Vishal–Shekhar, she considered them as fantastic composers who are influential to her in taking good music and found the work of KK delightful. A Kishore Kumar admirer, Rao learnt from him that "singing is more than music and lyrics"; should come "straight from heart". Rao has also been influenced by many artists outside the country. She considers artistes like Sade, Sting and Eddie Vedder as constant influences for her. Rao mentioned that she wants to lend her voice for Tabu the most and looks forward to working with Vishal Bhardwaj and Sachin–Jigar; "Bhardwaj is someone I really admire. I respect the work he has done so far and the new wave in music that he has brought about".

== Personal life and philanthropy ==
Describing herself as a "movie buff", she watches films from all over the world. She does not consider language as an issue. "If the plot clicks my fancy, I can watch anything". She considers Shruti Pathak and Meiyang Chang as her closest industry friends. Giving prior importance to hygiene, Rao avoids dusty places since she is allergic to dust. Maintaining a healthy diet, Rao restricts too much sweet, and "strong smelling fruits" since she is "very sensitive" to odors. Rao gives importance to be fit by taking the stairs instead of the elevator, "eating right" foods and "sleeping well".

In 2021, Rao married photographer Ritesh Krishnan in a registered wedding at her home. In an interview with Bombay Times about her wedding, Rao said, "We met three years ago on (music composer) Pritam's USA tour. Ritesh seemed to be an affectionate person, and we started hanging out together. On the first day that I met him, I felt that he was a chilled-out guy, which was very attractive for me. We started traveling together in 2018, and did many shows across India."

In addition to singing for films, Rao has supported charitable organisations for a number of causes. In March 2010, she appeared on NDTV's Greenathon, an initiative to support eco-friendliness and investigate poor electricity supplies in rural villages, to lend her support. In October 2011, Rao performed the track "Haseen Zindagi" along with Teesha Nigam, Shruti Pathak, Neha Bhasin, Shefali Alvares and Akriti Kakkar, composed by Sonu Nigam for the project in aid of breast cancer awareness. She performed in Delhi at the "100 Pipers Play for a Cause" which is a musical extravaganza dedicated to raising funds for people affected by the Nepal earthquake. On 2 March 2012, celebrated as Seagram's Fuel Music Day, Rao performed live along with 50 other artistes, on a digital platform ArtistAloud.com, to show their support for independent music in India.

In February 2013, Rao contributed in Coca-Cola NDTV "Support My School" which is a 12-hour telethon which raised funds and pledges for the revitalization of 272 schools. In May 2013, Rao performed in an event focused to create awareness about the effects and influence of tobacco and to raise funds for cancer patients. In October 2014, Rao took part in the musical concert held in New Delhi for raising funds for the flood affected people of Assam. In July 2015, Rao started "I am 100% Bihar" campaign for the state's clean energy project, through various social media.

== Awards and nominations ==
Award	Year	Category	Song	Work	Result	Ref(s)
National Film Awards	2025	Best Female Playback Singer	"Chaleya"	Jawan	Won	
Ananda Vikatan Cinema Awards	2024	Best Female Playback Singer	"Kaavaalaa"	Jailer	Nominated	
Filmfare Awards	2009	Best Female Playback Singer	"Khuda Jaane"	Bachna Ae Haseeno	Nominated	
Filmfare Awards	2010	Best Female Playback Singer	"Mudi Mudi"	Paa	Nominated	
Filmfare Awards	2020	Best Female Playback Singer	"Ghungroo"	War	Won	
Filmfare Awards	2023	Best Female Playback Singer	"Tere Hawaale"	Laal Singh Chaddha	Nominated	
Filmfare Awards	2024	Best Female Playback Singer	"Chaleya"	Jawan	Nominated	
Filmfare Awards	2024	Best Female Playback Singer	"Besharam Rang"	Pathaan	Won	
Filmfare Awards South	2024	Best Female Playback Singer – Tamil	"Kaavaalaa"	Jailer	Nominated	
Filmfare Awards South	2026	Best Female Playback Singer – Telugu	"Chuttamalle"	Devara: Part 1	Won	
IIFA Utsavam	2024	Best Female Playback Singer – Tamil	"Kaavaalaa"	Jailer	Nominated	
International Indian Film Academy Awards	2009	Best Female Playback Singer	"Khuda Jaane"	Bachna Ae Haseeno	Nominated	
International Indian Film Academy Awards	2010	Best Female Playback Singer	"Mudi Mudi"	Paa	Nominated	
International Indian Film Academy Awards	2020	Best Female Playback Singer	"Ghungroo"	War	Nominated	
International Indian Film Academy Awards	2024	Best Female Playback Singer	"Chaleya"	Jawan	Won	
International Indian Film Academy Awards	2024	Best Female Playback Singer	"Besharam Rang"	Pathaan	Nominated	
Screen Awards	2009	Best Female Playback Singer	"Khuda Jaane"	Bachna Ae Haseeno	Won	
Screen Awards	2010	Best Female Playback Singer	"Mudi Mudi"	Paa	Nominated	
Screen Awards	2020	Best Female Playback Singer	"Ghungroo"	War	Nominated	
Global Indian Music Academy Awards	2014	Best Music Debut	"Dum Dum"	Coke Studio	Won	
Global Indian Music Academy Awards	2012	Best Pop/Rock Single	"I Believe" With Parikrama, Agnee	The Dewarists	Nominated	
Indian Television Academy Awards	2011	Best Singer	"Bekaboo"	Navya..Naye Dhadkan Naye Sawaal	Won	
Mirchi Music Awards	2016	Female Vocalist of the Year	"Bulleya"	Ae Dil Hai Mushkil	Nominated	
Mirchi Music Awards	2020	Female Vocalist of the Year	"Ghungroo"	War	Nominated	
Mirchi Music Awards	2020	Song of The Year	"Ghungroo"	War	Nominated	
Mirchi Music Awards	2024	Female Vocalist of the Year	"Besharam Rang"	Pathaan	Won	
Mirchi Music Awards	2024	Female Vocalist of the Year	"Chaleya"	Jawan	Nominated	
Mirchi Music Awards	2024	Song of The Year	"Besharam Rang"	Pathaan	Won	
Mirchi Music Awards	2024	Song of The Year	"Chaleya"	Jawan	Nominated	
South Indian International Movie Awards	2025	Best Female Playback Singer – Telugu	"Chuttamalle"	Devara: Part 1	Won	
Zee Cine Awards	2017	Best Female Playback Singer	"Bulleya"	Ae Dil Hai Mushkil	Nominated	
Zee Cine Awards	2020	Best Female Playback Singer	"Ghungroo"	War	Nominated	
Zee Cine Awards	2020	Song of the Year	"Ghungroo"	War	Nominated	
Zee Cine Awards	2023	Best Female Playback Singer	"Tere Hawaale"	Laal Singh Chaddha	Nominated	
Zee Cine Awards	2024	Best Female Playback Singer	"Besharam Rang"	Pathaan	Won	

== See also ==
- List of Indian playback singers
