= Malang (song) =

Single by Pritam feat. Siddharth Mahadevan and Shilpa Rao

from the album Dhoom 3
- Language: Hindi; Punjabi; English; Urdu
- Released: 2 December 2013
- Recorded: 2012–2013
- Genre: Filmi; Soundtrack single; Sufi
- Length: 4:33
- Label: YRF Music, T-Series
- Composer: Pritam
- Lyricist: Sameer Anjaan
- Producers: Pritam; Aditya Chopra; YRF Music

Music video
- "Malang" on YouTube

"Malang" (transl. Vagrant or Wanderer) (Note: Nastaliq: ملنگ, Malaṉg IPA: [mələ̃ŋɡ]; The word 'malang' has several meanings in different regions, which are sometimes contradictory. Though it is considered to originate from Persia, in Afghanistan it can be used to refer to magicians, beggars, sorcerers and holy men. Author Jonathan L. Lees book, The "Ancient Supremacy": Bukhara, Afghanistan and the Battle for Balkh, 1731-1901 describes malang as "a religious mystic, often with heterodox or extreme sufi tendencies; a shrine attendant". The word's usage in the song is associated with the love of a nomadic nature, and thus "vagrant" has been used here.) is the second single released from the 2013 Hindi film Dhoom 3, which starred Aamir Khan, Katrina Kaif, Abhishek Bachchan, and Uday Chopra and was directed by Vijay Krishna Acharya. The song was composed by Pritam, Pritam composed for the previous two films of the film series, with lyrics by Sameer Anjaan. It was sung by Siddharth Mahadevan and Shilpa Rao and performed on film by Khan and Kaif. The song's performance is represented as part of a stage show. Malang was released on the digital music platform iTunes on 2 December 2013. Lyricist Sameer Anjaan has described the song as a "beautiful, pure and sublime Sufi love song".

== Production ==
The production for the song reportedly cost ₹50 million ($853,274) making it the second most expensive Indian music video of all time. It involved the work of 200 professional acrobats who were flown in from the United States for the song. The shoot, which took twenty days, used a set in Reliance Studios which took 2 months to construct. Cirque du Soleil performers were hired to train the two actors in acrobatic performance for a few weeks prior to the shoot, which was done without the use of safety nets or harness.

The film's choreography required performer Aamir Khan to spin about 60 times in a minute at an elevation of 80 feet. As a result, Khan suffered from nausea during the filming and had to be put on medication to combat the sensation. Los Angeles based airbrush artist Adam Tenenbaum applied Khan's intricate, tattoo-like body paint for the shoot. Katrina Kaif's part was choreographed by Shampa Gopikrishna; her sequences took 11 days to shoot.

== Music video ==
The song was shot in Mumbai's Film City.

The music video starts with a picture of Aamir Khan and Katrina Kaif. The shot then moves to center around the logo of the song in front of a platform in the shape of Star of David or Star of Goloka decorated with lights. Credits then display the names of the singers, Siddharth Mahadevan and Shilpa, that of the composer, Pritam, and lastly those of the contributing lyricist Sameer Anjaan.

The performance stage is lighted with small green, yellow and crimson coloured spotlights dotting the black background both horizontally and above the platform. The front of the stage is occupied by a water-body, semi-circular structures on two sides flanking the star shaped one in the middle, which holds the performers. An acrobat and a gymnast are at the front of the stage, along with others who are sitting on both sides of the water-body. While Sahir (portrayed by Aamir Khan in the film and music video) is shirtless and in black, Aliya (portrayed on screen by actress Katrina Kaif) wears a white outfit. Sahir enters the stage performing a front somersault while the stage lights up with pyrotechnics. Taking hold of an aerial silk, he glides once over the top of the audience whilst holding a torch with his free hand. Aliya enters the stage from above sitting on an aerial hoop while Sahir dances below, followed by both of them dancing together as well as performing aerobatic stunts in mid air with the support of aerial hoops and aerial silk rigged above. The rest of the video consists of pictures of Sahir and Aliya with the lyrics below, interspersed with a few scenes from the film. The video ends with Sahir throwing his bowler hat towards the screen, which leads to the logo of the film along with the film's release date. (Note: The synopsis here is for the 4:46-long YouTube video released by Yash Raj Films, featuring mostly lyrics. The makers of the film have decided against releasing the full video online, instead releasing only a 30-second promo with the promise that the full song is available only in theatres. Due to similar footage the part-lyrical video has been used.)

== Critical reception ==
Both the film's soundtrack and the Malang single received mixed to positive reviews from critics. Critic Rajiv Vijayakar, reviewing the single for Bollywood Hungama, praised the song's Sufi influences and the "full-throated" singing. Joginder Tuteja, reviewing for Rediff.com, described the song as a "love track with a good rhythm" but criticised it for having an uncanny resemblance to another track, titled Jhoom Barabar Jhoom, from a 2007 film of the same name that was also produced by Yash Raj Films. Mohar Basu, reviewing for Koimoi.com, stated "this one is a Thumbs up!" acknowledging Rao's vocals, the grandeur of the music video, the lyrics, and the "sprinkling of Pre-modern Balkan music" that he detected in it.

== FIR filing ==
A First Information Report (FIR) has been filed against Yash Raj Films by the Madariyya Sufi community on grounds of "hurting their religious sentiments and defaming their tradition."

== Track listing ==
- Digital Download

=== Hindi Version ===
1. "Malang" – 4:36

=== Tamil Version ===
1. "Mayanga" – 4:33

=== Telugu Version ===
1. "Tarang" – 4:33
