= Bang Bang! =

2014 Indian film by Siddharth Anand

- Theatrical release poster
- Directed by: Siddharth Anand
- Screenplay by: Sujoy Ghosh; Suresh Nair
- Dialogues by: Abbas Tyrewala
- Story by: Original: Patrick O'Neill; Adapted: Siddharth Anand
- Based on: Knight and Day (2010) by James Mangold
- Produced by: Fox Star Studios
- Starring: Hrithik Roshan; Katrina Kaif
- Cinematography: Sunil Patel
- Edited by: Akiv Ali
- Music by: Songs: Vishal–Shekhar; Score: Salim–Sulaiman
- Production company: Fox Star Studios
- Distributed by: Fox Star Studios
- Release date: 2 October 2014
- Running time: 153 minutes
- Country: India
- Language: Hindi
- Budget: ₹140 crore
- Box office: ₹332.43 crore

Bang Bang! is a 2014 Indian Hindi-language romantic action comedy film directed by Siddharth Anand and produced by Fox Star Studios. An official remake of American film Knight and Day (2010), the film also borrows inspiration from the 2012 Bengali film Jaaneman. It marks Anand's running foray into the action genre, and stars Hrithik Roshan and Katrina Kaif, alongside Javed Jaffrey, Danny Denzongpa, and Pavan Malhotra. The soundtrack and background score were handled by Vishal–Shekhar and Salim–Sulaiman respectively, marking the latter's final collaboration with Anand, while the cinematography and editing were handled by Sunil Patel and Akiv Ali respectively. In the film, a mysterious thief encounters an unassuming bank receptionist, which sets off a chain of events resulting in a series of escapades.

Bang Bang! was released on 2 October 2014, coinciding with Gandhi Jayanti with dubbed versions releasing on the same day simultaneously in Telugu and Tamil. The film received positive reviews from critics and grossed ₹332 crore (US$54.4 million) globally to become one of the highest-grossing Hindi films of 2014.

== Plot ==
After a treaty between India and UK to expedite extradition of Omar Zafar, a notorious terrorist, to India is passed, Col. Viren Nanda gets killed and is burnt alive by Omar in London during his escape from prison. Omar gets escorted by his trusted lieutenant Hamid Gul and declares US$5 million reward for an Indian thief to steal the Koh-i-Noor.

Rajveer Nanda, a mysterious person, steals the Koh-i-Noor and demands US$20 million when Zafar and Gul aim to retrieve it. After a subsequent brawl with Gul's men at a local restaurant in Shimla, Rajveer visits a restaurant and meets Harleen Sahni, a bank receptionist who dreams of finding true love and adventure in life. Harleen is waiting for her blind internet date Vickie Kapoor. Rajveer assumes the date and the pair fall for each other, but is forced to abandon her after being found by Gul's men. Harleen leaves upon learning the truth and seeing the real Vickie who admits to his car and phone failing him, but on her way back home, she bumps into Rajveer again, and he seeks her help to remove a bullet. Before leaving, Rajveer drugs her with sedative water and informs her of scare tactics that some law enforcement officials will try and coerce her into working against him.

Rajveer's prediction comes true as two government agents Zorawar Kalra and his informer, Inspector Bhola implore Harleen to travel with them to the police station, but instead head for a safe place. Taking note of Rajveer's instructions, Harleen finds a pistol and holds them at gunpoint. Rajveer arrives and the pair escapes, but they meet Harleen's manager Karan Saxena, who is shot in the leg by Rajveer. Harleen demands that she return home and tells that she made a huge mistake by trusting Rajveer, which leads to an argument over their loyalties, but Harleen eventually decides to stay upon realizing that he truly intends to protect her and proceeds to accompany him. During a visit to a Pizza Hut outlet, Rajveer reveals that he stole the Koh-i-Noor, much to Harleen's surprise, and the pair are immediately confronted by Zorawar and his team.

Rajveer tranquilizes Harleen and escapes with her. Harleen wakes up at a beach after an unknown period on the run. When Harleen takes Rajveer's phone to call her grandmother, the government officials and Gul's men, led by Gul's lieutenant Robert, tracks them down and a shootout ensues, which forces the duo to escape again after eliminating the officials and Robert's henchmen. Harleen wakes up the following morning in Prague, where she regains her faith in Rajveer after recognising his efforts in leading the escape. Later, they track Gul to a casino and after a plot involving Harleen, Rajveer ultimately kills Gul. Harleen is taken to the Indian Embassy, where she meets Zorawar and his boss, Internal Secret Services Chief Narayanan as he gives her a tracking device to pinpoint Rajveer's location and retrieve the Koh-i-Noor.

After another argument on a bridge as they try to escape, Rajveer activates the tracking device and gives the Koh-i-Noor to Harleen, where he gets shot while jumping off the bridge. Harleen returns home and reunites with her grandmother, but begins to miss Rajveer; in a moment of epiphany, Harleen locates his house and meets Rajveer's father Pankaj and his mother Shikha by posing as a delivery runner for Pankaj's book order. A tense moment results in Harleen trying to leave suddenly when she soon bumps into photographs of Rajveer, who is revealed by Shikha to be Jaiwant "Jai" Nanda, Viren's brother; while Viren's murder is confirmed, Pankaj refuses to accept the army's version of the story behind Jai's death as he pinpoints to a swimming championship trophy he had won in his young days, being the only person who was able to cross the lake in just one breath.

Immediately outside her home, Harleen is kidnapped and taken to the interior of a desert castle, where she meets Zafar, who reveals that the surrendered diamond is a fake, while Zorawar turns out to be Zafar's informer. Zorawar gives Harleen a truth serum in an attempt to find the location of the real diamond, but she deduces that Rajveer is alive and is arriving to kill Zafar and his men. At the same time, Rajveer, who was assumed dead, plants time bombs and silently eliminates Zafar's henchmen, who have been posted outside the castle. Inside the castle, Rajveer confronts Zafar, revealing that the Koh-i-Noor was not stolen at all and that it was a joint operation between the MI6 and the ISS to apprehend Zafar. Rajveer reveals that he intends to avenge Viren's death by killing Zafar.

As the time bombs destroying the castle start going off, Zafar escapes with his remaining men while Rajveer escapes with Harleen, saving her all along. However, Zafar later blocks the duo, where he takes Harleen hostage and leaves with her on a seaplane. Enraged, Rajveer eventually catches up, shooting down the seaplane to the ground and ultimately Zorawar in the process. Following an intense confrontation, Rajveer kills Zafar after pushing Harleen out of the burning aircraft and jumps out of the seaplane, which explodes seconds after Zafar's death. Rajveer loses consciousness and starts to drown, but is saved by Harleen as army officers airlift the duo.

Rajveer wakes up in a hospital and is informed by Narayanan, revealed to be his real boss, that he will not be allowed to see Harleen or his own family. Posing as a nurse, Harleen administers a sedative, knocking Rajveer out, and the pair escapes. After an unknown period on the run, Rajveer reunites with his parents and finally introduces Harleen to them.

== Cast ==
- Hrithik Roshan as Jaiwant "Jai" Nanda a.k.a. Rajveer Nanda, an Internal Secret Services agent and Indian Army officer
- Katrina Kaif as Harleen Sahni, a receptionist at Bank of Shimla
- Kanwaljit Singh as Pankaj Nanda, Rajveer and Viren's father
- Deepti Naval as Shikha Nanda, Rajveer and Viren's mother
- Jimmy Sheirgill as Colonel Viren Nanda, Rajveer's brother (special appearance)
- Danny Denzongpa as Omar Zafar, a dreaded terrorist
- Jaaved Jaaferi as Hamid Gul
- Pavan Malhotra as Zorawar Kalra
- Kamlesh Gill as Harleen's grandmother
- Vikram Gokhale as R&AW Chief Narayanan
- Pradeep Kabra as Inspector Bhola
- Partha Akerkar as Robert
- Arsha Aghdasi as a Goon
- Frank M. Ahearn as Bok Choy
- Amir Badri as a Rogue
- Steven Clarke as a Henchman
- Jawed El Berni as the Chain fighter
- Tina Grimm as Raver
- Damian Mavis as a Gangster
- Bill O'Leary as a Boat goon driver
- Desmond O'Neill as a Henchman
- John Pasley as a Henchman / Cop
- Aditya Prakash as a Receptionist at Pizza Hut
- Anteo Quintavalle as a Henchman
- Ron Smoorenburg as a Henchman
- Ankur Vikal as Shoaib

== Production ==
=== Casting ===
Earlier reports had suggested that Siddharth Anand, who had made Salaam Namaste, Ta Ra Rum Pum, Bachna Ae Haseeno and Anjaana Anjaani in the past, planned to make his next film with Shahid Kapoor, but Shahid Kapoor wanted to avoid comparisons with Tom Cruise and did not have availability of his dates for the film as he had signed onto Haider. Bipasha Basu rumouredly was also on board, but she eventually turned down the film. Soon news came that Siddharth Anand was planning a film with Hrithik Roshan. In September 2012, Hrithik Roshan was confirmed to play the lead role, with Katrina Kaif playing the female lead. Hrithik Roshan started working on the film immediately after wrapping up Krrish 3 and charged a ₹300 million fee for his performance in the film, which until then was the most any actor in Hindi cinema had charged up front. The film was soon revealed to be the official adaptation of Knight and Day.

=== Makeup ===
In June 2014, the Bollywood group known as the Cine Costume Make-Up Artist & Hair Dressers' Association (CCMAA) authorized an official protest on the movie set of Bang Bang! in protest of foreign make-up artist Daniel Bauer working on the movie for its lead actress, Katrina Kaif. The CCMAA and 15 of its members protested on the movie set as Daniel Bauer was not registered with the Union, despite the Union banning foreign artists working in Bollywood. The issue was resolved with the CCMAA granting Daniel Bauer full membership.

=== Filming ===
In December 2012, it was confirmed that the official remake of Knight and Day would be titled Bang Bang. In March 2013, the film's Kashmir schedule was cancelled. Shooting for the film began on 1 May 2013, with the film scheduled for release on 1 May 2014. Unique water action sequences were shot in Thailand and Greece. In an interview with Mumbai Mirror, Roshan spoke about the action sequences in the film stating, "I have pushed myself to the extreme for this stunt. This sequence called for mental and physical tenacity. The rush that I experienced while training and executing the sequence was out of the world. I was hooked to a sea plane while I did the stunt. I had trained non-stop to even attempt the sequence". Roshan refused to use any body double to perform the stunts.

Talking about another water action sequences, the film's director Siddharth Anand revealed, "We can control the action we shoot on land, but while shooting at sea, you're at the mercy of the tide. Three days before the shoot, Hrithik started practicing the stunts for five-six hours daily. It took us eight days to shoot the sequences in water. For another water action sequence, Hrithik trained for four days, before the shooting. He learnt to jetski with a speed boat pulling him along first. Then, an antiquated plane was brought in with an experienced pilot at the controls, so that it could be slowed down and speeded up at will."

In July 2013, one of the songs of the film, "Meherbaan" was shot in the city of Santorini in Greece and choreographed by Ahmed Khan. In Phuket, Roshan performed a stunt where he had to use a water jetpack called a Flyboard and go 45 feet high in the sky and then dive down in the water. Roshan thus became the first actor in Hollywood or Bollywood to do a flyboarding stunt in a film. He was injured during this schedule and subsequently had to undergo a brain surgery for removal of a blood clot from his brain. Also, the Kashmir schedule of the film was delayed because of unrest in the valley.

The delays caused the film's release date to be postponed to 2 October 2014. There were reports that the film had overshot its budget to ₹1.3 billion from a planned budget of around 80–90 crore. Anand denied such reports, saying "It's funny! Yes, Bang Bang! is a big-ticket film but its budget is as per the scale of the film. There's no question of exceeding it." The shooting resumed in January 2014, in Shimla, Manali, Mumbai, Abu Dhabi, Delhi and Prague. The shooting schedule in Shimla went on for straight six weeks. The Manali bridge where the majority of scenes were shot, has become a grand tourist attraction and it was renamed as Bang Bang Point. Just before the Abu Dhabi segment of the film, a song shoot was completed at an open-cafeteria in Film City, Mumbai on 19 April 2014. Shimla was created in Film City, Mumbai to shoot a song and few action sequences for the film. The film was shot for 20 days in Film City with the lead pair. After wrapping up the Mumbai schedule, the filming team left for Abu Dhabi.

The Abu Dhabi schedule of shooting was intense and action-packed. In Abu Dhabi, filming started early May, and took place at various locations in Abu Dhabi including the Corniche, Liwa oasis, Hyatt Capital Gate Hotel, Qasr al Sarab, Emirates Palace and Yas Island. In one of the chase sequences in the film, 120 cars were involved. The film also had used Formula 1 cars. Even after the brain surgery, all the stunts were performed by Roshan himself. The stunts were designed by Andy Armstrong and shot in Abu Dhabi. The Abu Dhabi segment of shooting was completed on 20 May in collaboration with twofour54. It is the first Bollywood film to be shot and co-produced in Abu Dhabi. The last leg of the film was scheduled in Prague. One stunt in which Roshan is on water skis while being pulled along by a sky plane was shot in a lake in Prague. He trained for four days to shoot this scene. Shooting wrapped on 15 July 2014.

While filming in Thailand, Roshan suffered a head injury from a stunt accident and underwent brain surgery at the Hinduja Hospital, done by B. K. Misra to relieve subacute-subdural hematoma.

=== Marketing ===
On the lines of the popular Ice Bucket Challenge – one of the biggest trends of the year, the dare on social media, Roshan came up with the dare-to-do game to Bollywood co-stars Aamir Khan, Shah Rukh Khan, Salman Khan, Nargis Fakhri, Sonam Kapoor, Ranveer Singh, Farhan Akhtar, Priyanka Chopra, Dino Morea, Uday Chopra and Dabboo Ratnani on Twitter asking them to post videos of themselves doing a particular task and adding the hashtag #bangbangdare to it. Roshan even dared the smokers asking them not to smoke for 3 days. One of the companies challenged Roshan himself, where he was asked to buy bed sheets from their store and if he did, ₹500,000 would be donated to city hospitals. He took up the dare sportingly. While most stars take to television shows to generate buzz about their films, Roshan refrained from promoting his movie through reality TV shows.

To protect the film from piracy, the makers of the film approached the Court of Piracy with the plea that the film should not be viewed on any device or broadcast on any platform through the Internet without their permission and submitted a list of 90 websites. The Court responded positively on that and restrained them all from making the film available on the Internet.

A promotional mobile video game based on the film was developed by Nazara Technologies and released the same year.

== Soundtrack ==
The songs of the film were composed by Vishal–Shekhar, while the background score has been composed by Salim–Sulaiman in their final collaboration with director Siddharth Anand. The digital album rights of the film were acquired by Zee Music Company. The album was preceded with three singles: "Tu Meri", "Meherbaan" and "Bang Bang". The soundtrack was released on 11 September 2014. All the songs were well received by audiences.

== Release ==
The film released worldwide on 2 October 2014.

== Reception ==
Bang Bang! received mixed to positive reviews from critics.

=== Critical response ===
Bollywood Hungama gave 3.5/5 stars and wrote "If you are looking high-octane action scenes, sleek visuals, melodious music, Bang Bang should definitely be your pick for this extended weekend." Meena Iyer of The Times of India gave 3/5 stars and wrote "Bang Bang makes more noise and little sense. This desi adaptation of Knight and Day has charm in abundance because of its effervescent lead pair, but it lacks coherence."

Rajeev Masand on IBN Live gave 2/5 stars and commented that "the film isn't unwatchable, but certainly tests your patience." Paloma Sharma of Rediff gave 1.5/5 stars and wrote "A worse official remake of an already bad original, Bang Bang is more noise and less sound." Raja Sen from the same website agreed with Sharma and wrote that the film is "a stupid, stupid film trying to be slick, a B-grade film made on an A-list budget.". The Indian Express rated it 1.5/5, calling Roshan "the eye candy of the film".

== Box office ==
Worldwide, Bang Bang grossed ₹333 crore ($57 million), becoming one of the highest-grossing Bollywood films of 2014.

=== India ===
Bang Bang! (Hindi) had a theatrical run for 5 weeks with a final domestic nett of around ₹1.81 billion. The Tamil and Telugu versions of the film grossed around ₹60 million nett.

=== Overseas ===
Bang Bang! earned $4.89 million overseas in its opening weekend. The biggest debut came from the UAE ($1.8 million), North America ($3.35 million), United Kingdom ($922,000). At the end of its theatrical run overseas, the film earned $13.97 million. The highest revenue came from Gulf ($4.46 million), US/Canada ($2.62 million), UK (£1.165 million) and Australia (Aus $457,000).

== Awards and nominations ==
Award	Category	Recipients and nominees	Result	Ref.
7th Mirchi Music Awards	Male Vocalist of The Year	Vishal Dadlani - "Tu Meri"	Nominated	
7th Mirchi Music Awards	Best Song Producer (Programming & Arranging)	Abhijit Nalani & Zoheb Khan - "Bang Bang"	Nominated	
