= Jaane Tu... Ya Jaane Na (soundtrack) =

Soundtrack album by A. R. Rahman
- Released: 21 May 2008
- Recorded: 2005–2006
- Studios: Panchathan Record Inn and AM Studios, Chennai
- Genre: Feature film soundtrack
- Length: 38:31
- Language: Hindi
- Labels: T-Series, Universal Music Japan
- Producer: A.R. Rahman

A. R. Rahman chronology
Jodhaa Akbar (2008)	Jaane Tu... Ya Jaane Na (2008)	Sakkarakatti (2008)

Jaane Tu... Ya Jaane Na is the soundtrack album to the 2008 film of the same name directed by Abbas Tyrewala and produced by Aamir Khan Productions and PVR Pictures starring Imran Khan and Genelia D'Souza. The film's soundtrack featured ten songs composed by A. R. Rahman featuring lyrics written by Tyrewala himself. The album was released through T-Series on 21 May 2008 to positive reviews from critics and fetched Rahman the Filmfare Award for Best Music Director; the album also won the inaugural Mirchi Music Award for Album of The Year.

== Background ==
In an interaction with Nithya Ramani and Syed Firdaus Ashraf of Rediff.com, Rahman felt that working with Abbas Tyrewala was initially strange but got used to each other. When the songs were composed, the producer Aamir Khan appreciated them and recalled that both Rahman and Tyrewala would make a good team. Rahman opined that "It's just that when he gets excited about something, he likes the integrity of the same thing. And when something goes wrong, he wants to bring the integrity back." Aamir involved in the music discussion of this film and the actor's previous collaboration Rang De Basanti (2005) along with the actor's subsequent film Ghajini. Aamir stated that the score was "very youthful and fresh".

== Release ==
Initially the film's music was scheduled to be launched on 21 May 2008 at a grand event in Mumbai. However, Aamir cancelled the event and directly presented the first copy of the audio CD to veteran actor Shammi Kapoor at his residence on the same date; he previously did the same for the audio release of his directorial Taare Zameen Par (2007). Speaking of this initiative, Aamir added "Shammiji's blessings are important. He has been a guiding force since a long time and has been very close to our family. It's a kind of ritual for us to go and present him the first copy of the music. This time it's Imran's launch and it's all the more important." Besides the physical launch, the album was further made available for streaming through digital platforms.

== Reception ==
The soundtrack received positive reviews. Sukanya Verma of Rediff.com rated three out of five stars and stated, "Rahman's frothy tonic of vibrant and breezily-tempered creations in Jaane Tu...Ya Jaane Na should certainly catch your fancy." Joginder Tuteja from Bollywood Hungama rated three-and-a-half out of five and mentioned that the album is "unlike a conventional Bollywood score and instead introduces a style, which goes with the contemporary youthful setting. It is an album, which deserves to be bought this season." Meghna Menon, a reviewer based at Indo-Asian News Service, commended "AR Rahman's attempt at experimenting with new and different sounds for the album may not have resulted in chartbuster hits, but the attempt is worth hearing" and rated three out of five.

Bhasker Gupta of AllMusic wrote "A. R. Rahman rightfully excludes his usual grandeur here and sticks to cheery melodic compositions without compromising his genius." Karthik Srinivasan of Milliblog wrote "Abbas Tyrewala’s directorial debut has Rahman giving him youthful and trendy numbers, even though the overall package is entertainingly diverse from a standard Rahman product." Gauthaman Bhaskaran of The Hollywood Reporter wrote "A.R. Rahman’s music no longer has the magic of his earlier days, but here one finds a bit of the old pep." Khalid Mohamed of Hindustan Times mentioned Rahman's score as "remarkably bouncy, especially the 'Kabhi Kabhi Aditi' and 'Pappu Can’t Dance Saala' tracks".

The soundtrack held the number one spot on the music charts for several consecutive weeks. According to the Indian trade website Box Office India, with around 15,00,000 units sold, this film's soundtrack album was the year's eighth highest-selling.

== Track listing ==
All lyrics are written by Abbas Tyrewala.

No.	Title	Artist(s)	Length
1.	"Kabhi Kabhi Aditi"	Rashid Ali	3:41
2.	"Pappu Can't Dance Saala"	Naresh Iyer, Anupama, Benny Dayal, Blaaze, Tanvi Shah, Darshana KT, Satish Subrahmanium, Mohammed Aslam	4:27
3.	"Tu Bole, Main Boloon – The Title Theme"	A. R. Rahman	4:36
4.	"Nazrein Milana Nazrein Churana"	Benny Dayal, Satish Chakravarthy, Naresh Iyer, Darshana KT, Swetha Mohan, Tanvi Shah, Sayanora Philip, Bhargavi, Anupama	3:57
5.	"Jaane Tu Mera Kya Hai" (Female)	Runa Rizvi	3:41
6.	"Kahin To"	Rashid Ali, Vasundhara Das	5:05
7.	"Jaane Tu Meri Kya Hai" (Male)	Sukhwinder Singh	5:44
8.	"Pappu Can't Dance Saala" (Remix)	Anupama, Benny Dayal, Dev Negi, Blaaze, Tanvi Shah, Darshana KT, Satish Subrahmanium, Mohammed Aslam, Krishna Chetan	4:27
Total length:			38:31

== Accolades ==
Award	Date of ceremony (Note: Date is linked to the article about the awards held that year, wherever possible.)	Category	Recipient(s)	Result	Ref.
Filmfare Awards	28 February 2009	Best Music Director	A. R. Rahman	Won	
Filmfare Awards	28 February 2009	Best Lyricist	Abbas Tyrewala for "Kabhi Kabhi Aditi"	Nominated	
Filmfare Awards	28 February 2009	Best Male Playback Singer	Rashid Ali for "Kabhi Kabhi Aditi"	Nominated	
Mirchi Music Awards	28 March 2009	Album of The Year	A. R. Rahman, Abbas Tyrewala	Won	
Mirchi Music Awards	28 March 2009	Music Composer of The Year	A. R. Rahman	Won	
Mirchi Music Awards	28 March 2009	Listeners' Choice Song of the Year	"Kabhi Kabhi Aditi"	Won	
Mirchi Music Awards	28 March 2009	Listeners' Choice Album of the Year	Jaane Tu... Ya Jaane Na	Won	
Screen Awards	14 January 2009	Best Music Director	A. R. Rahman	Won	
Screen Awards	14 January 2009	Best Male Playback	Rashid Ali for "Kabhi Kabhi Aditi"	Nominated	
Producers Guild Film Awards (Note: Previously known as Apsara Film & Television Producers Guild Awards.)	5 December 2009	Best Music Director	A. R. Rahman	Nominated	
Producers Guild Film Awards	5 December 2009	Best Lyricist	Abbas Tyrewala	Nominated	
Producers Guild Film Awards	5 December 2009	Best Male Playback Singer	Rashid Ali for "Kabhi Kabhi Aditi"	Nominated	
Producers Guild Film Awards	5 December 2009	Best Female Playback Singer	Anupama, Tanvi, Darshana for "Pappu Can't Dance Saala!"	Nominated	
Stardust Awards	15 February 2009	New Musical Sensation – Male	Benny Dayal for "Pappu Can't Dance Saala!"	Won	
