= Golden Kela Awards =

Awards recognizing the worst in Bollywood

- Awarded for: Worst in Hindi Cinema
- Country: India
- Presented by: Random Magazine
- First award: 2009
- Website: goldenkela.com

The Golden Kela Awards are a satirical take on Bollywood that award the worst performances in Hindi cinema each year. Created by Random Magazine and inspired by the Golden Raspberry Awards, winners are selected each year by an online poll and receive an award in the shape of a golden banana (केला kelā in Hindi). The first award ceremony took place on 7 March 2009 in New Delhi (India). The fifth award ceremony was held on 30 March 2013. Jaspal Bhatti made a special appearance at the inaugural event, dishonoring the Indian film talent of the year 2008. The intention behind the Golden Kela is to ridicule the Hindi film stars and acknowledge the worst of Indian Cinema. Since, several award ceremonies each year celebrate the best of Hindi Cinema, Random Magazine and the Sundaas Film Institute chose to be different by giving away the Best of the Worst of Indian Cinema. Golden Kela Awards are not meant to insult anyone. It is just a way to make it a laughter exercise, a therapy of sorts to forget about the failures and look at what went wrong with the movie and the act. Abhishek Bachchan came to the Golden Kela Awards in 2010 and accepted the Dara Singh Award for his attempt to speak with an American accent in Delhi-6.

== Categories ==
=== Main awards ===
- Worst Movie
- Worst Director
- Worst Actor (Male)
- Worst Actor (Female)
- Worst Supporting Actor (Male)
- Worst Supporting Actor (Female)
- Worst Debutant
- Baawra Ho Gaya Hai Ke Award (transl. "Have you gone mad?")
- Most Irritating Song
- Most Atrocious Lyrics

=== Special categories ===
- Worst Pair
- Lajja Award for Worst Treatment of a Serious Issue
- Dara Singh Award For Worst Accent
- Shakti Kapoor Award For Misogyny
- Bas Kijiye Bahut Ho Gaya Award (transl. "Stop it, enough!")

== Winners ==
=== 2009 ===
Winners List:

- Most Atrocious Lyrics: Anvita Dutt for "Lucky Boy" from Bachna Ae Haseeno
- Most Unoriginal Story: Hari Puttar: A Comedy of TerrorsHari Puttar: A Comedy of Terrors
- Most Irritating Song of the Year: "Tandoori Nights" from Karzzzz

Category	Nominee	For
Worst Film	Love Story 2050	
Worst Director	Kunal Kohli	Thoda Pyaar Thoda Magic
Worst Actor (Female)	Priyanka Chopra	Love Story 2050
Worst Supporting Actor (Male)	Akshay Kumar	Chandni Chowk to China
Worst Supporting Actor (Female)	Kangana Ranaut	Fashion
Worst Debutant (Male)	Harman Baweja	Love Story 2050
Worst Debutant (Female)	Asin	Ghajini
Bawra Ho Gaya Hai Ke Award	Ram Gopal Varma	
When Did This Come Out Award	Wafa	
Lajja Award for Worst Treatment of a Serious Issue Award	Deshdrohi	
Insensitivity Award	Fashion	
Worst Dialogue Delivery	Tusshar Kapoor	

=== 2010 ===
Category	Nominee	For
Worst Film	Sabbir Khan	Kambakkht Ishq
Worst Director	Ashutosh Gowariker	What's Your Raashee?
Worst Actor (Male)	Harman Baweja	What's Your Raashee?
Worst Actor (Female)	Kareena Kapoor	Kambakkht Ishq
Worst Supporting Actor (Male)	Ranvir Shorey	Chandni Chowk to China
Worst Supporting Actor (Female)	Deepika Padukone	Chandni Chowk to China
Bawra Ho Gaya Hai Ke Award	Denise Richards; Sylvester Stallone	Kambakkht Ishq
Worst Debutant (Male)	Jackky Bhagnani	Kal Kissne Dekha
Worst Debutant (Female)	Shruti Haasan	Luck
Worst Pair	Shahid Kapoor and Rani Mukerji	Dil Bole Hadippa!

=== 2011 ===
Category	Nominee	For
Worst Film	Kumar Mangat Pathak	Toonpur Ka Superrhero
Worst Director	Siddharth Anand	Anjaana Anjaani
Worst Actor (Male)	Shah Rukh Khan	My Name Is Khan
Worst Actor (Female)	Sonam Kapoor	Aisha
Worst Supporting Actor (Male)	Arjun Rampal	We Are Family; Housefull
Worst Supporting Actor (Female)	Kangana Ranaut	Kites
Worst Debutant (Male)	Aditya Narayan	Shaapit
Worst Debutant (Female)	Pakhi Tyrewala	Jhoota Hi Sahi
Worst Story		Action Replayy
Bawra Ho Gaya Hai Ke Award	Ben Kingsley	Teen Patti
Most Atrocious Lyrics	Cry Cry Kitna Cry	Jhoota Hi Sahi
Most Irritating Song of The Year	Pee Loon	Once Upon a Time in Mumbaai
Worst Animated Film		Baru - The Wonder Kid
When Did This Came Out Award		Ek Second... Jo Zindagi Badal De?
The Chimpoo Kapoor Award (For No-Talent Relatives of Celebrities)	Uday Chopra	
3 Idiots Childbirth Award (For The Most Ridiculous Sequences in a Film)		Prince
Lajja Award (For Worst Treatment of A Serious Issue)		Dunno Y... Na Jaane Kyon
Bas Kijiye Bahut Ho Gaya Award	Ram Gopal Varma	
Jajantaram Mamantaram Award (For Worst Named Film)		Lafangey Parindey
Special Award for The Worst Trilogy Ever in the History of Films		Golmaal (series)
Black Award (For Emotional Blackmail)		Guzaarish
The Ajooba Award (For Sheer Awesomeness)		Dabangg
Sonu Nigam Award (For Career Suicide)	Sukhwinder Singh	
Worst Casting Ever	Jackie Shroff	Malik Ek

=== 2012 ===
Category	Nominee	For
Worst Film	Gauri Khan	Ra.One
Worst Director	Anubhav Sinha	Ra.One
Worst Actor (Male)	Imran Khan	Mere Brother Ki Dulhan
Worst Actor (Female)	Kareena Kapoor	Bodyguard
Worst Supporting Actor	Prateik Babbar	Dum Maaro Dum
Most Irritating Song	Teri Meri	Bodyguard
Most Atrocious Lyrics	Amitabh Bhattacharya	Pyaar Do Pyar Lo; Jigar Da Tukhda; The Mutton Song
Worst Debut (Male)	Chirag Paswan	Miley Naa Miley Hum
Bawra Ho Gaya Hai Ke Award	Pankaj Kapoor	Mausam
The Aaja Nach Le Award (For Worst Attempt For Comeback)	Esha Deol	Tell Me O Khuda
The Lajja Award (For Worst Treatment of a Serious Issue)		Aarakshan
The Bas Kijiye Bahut Ho Gaya Award (For Now its Too Much)	Pritam	
The Shakti Kapoor Award (For Misogyny)		Pyaar Ka Punchnama
The F.A.L.T.U. Award (For The Most honestly Named Film)		F.A.L.T.U

=== 2013 ===
The nominations for 5th Golden Kela awards were announced on 22 December 2013. Following are the nominees of the 5th Golden Kela:

Category	Nominee	For	Result
Worst Actor (Male)	Imran Khan	Ek Main Aur Ekk Tu	Won
Worst Actor (Male)	Ram Charan	Zanjeer	Nominated
Worst Actor (Male)	Sanjay Dutt	Agneepath	Nominated
Worst Actor (Male)	Akshay Kumar	Housefull 2 Rowdy Rathore; Joker; Khiladi 786	Nominated
Worst Actor (Male)	Siddharth Malhotra and Varun Dhawan	Student of the Year	Nominated
Worst Actor (Female)	Sonakshi Sinha	Rowdy Rathore; Son of Sardaar; Joker; Dabangg 2	Won
Worst Actor (Female)	Katrina Kaif	Ek Tha Tiger	Nominated
Worst Actor (Female)	Deepika Padukone & Diana Penty	Cocktail	Nominated
Worst Actor (Female)	Farah Khan	Shirin Farhad Ki Toh Nikal Padi	Nominated
Worst Actor (Female)	Alia Bhatt	Student of the Year	Nominated
Worst Film	Son Of Sardaar	For being offensive...not just to the Sikh community, but to anyone with intelligence and a sense of humour.	Nominated
Worst Film	Housefull 2	For being way more full (of bad jokes, poor acting, horrible writing and cast members) than we could take.	Nominated
Worst Film	Joker	For being one of the worst films ever made...anywhere.	Won
Worst Film	Khiladi 786	For (among other reasons) being written by the 'multi-talented genius' known as Himesh Reshammiya	Nominated
Worst Film	Dabangg 2	For not being Dabangg	Nominated
Most Atrocious Song	Hookah Bar	Khiladi 786	Nominated
Most Atrocious Song	Do You Know from Housefull 2	For leaving everyone's ears bleeding	Won
Most Atrocious Song	Son Of Sardaar	Son Of Sardaar	Nominated
Most Atrocious Song	Anarkali Disco Chali	Housefull 2	Nominated
Most Atrocious Song	Disco Deewane	Student of the Year	Nominated

Most Atrocious Lyrics

- Anvita Dutt Ishq Wala Love (Student of the Year)
- Amitabh Bhattacharya: Halkat Jawani (Heroine)
- Shabbir Ahmed: Bipasha Bipasha (Jodi Breakers)
- Shabbir Ahmed: Po Po (Son of Sardaar)
- Sameer Anjaan: Chinta Ta Chita Chita (Rowdy Rathore)
- Himesh Reshammiya: Hookah Bar (Khiladi 786)

Baawra Ho Gaya Hai Ke Award

- Homi Adajania: For following up Being Cyrus with Cocktail. We had expectations from you, Homi.
- Sanjay Khanduri: For taking his own awesome Ek Chalis Ki Last Local, setting it in Delhi and making Kismat Love Paisa Dilli... and doing a horrible job of it.
- Ali Azmat: For sounding like a parody of his former self in the song Maula from Jism 2.
- Indian Moviegoers: For spending more than 600 crores on Bol Bachchan, Housefull 2, Agneepath, Rowdy Rathore and Ek Tha Tiger (we'll keep adding the crores as figures keep coming in for Khiladi 786 and Dabangg 2).

==== Anti-Kela Awards ====
- Paan Singh Tomar - For reminding us why we always (secretly) loved the dacoits more than the heroes.
- Gangs of Wasseypur - For reminding us that sa Hindustan mein jab tak cinema hai, log ca bante rahenge.
- Kahaani - For showing that a film doesn't need a 'hero' to be a hit.
- Vicky Donor - For showing that you can make a 'family comedy' about sperm donation (and reminding us why we used to like Annu Kapoor)

=== 2014 ===
Worst Actor (male) - Ajay Devgan for Himmatwala

Worst Actor (female)- Sonakshi Sinha for Everything She Did

Worst director - Sajid Khan for Himmatwala

Worst film - Himmatwala

Supporting Actor (Male) - Aftab Shivdasani for Grand Masti

Supporting Actor (Female) - Deepika Padukone, Jacqueline Fernandez and Ameesha Patel for Race 2

Most Annoying Song - "Party All Night" from Boss

Most Atrocious Lyrics - Sameer for "Raghupati Raghav" (Krrish 3)

Most Pointless Sequel/Remake Award – Himmatwala

Why Are You Still Trying Award – Neil Nitin Mukesh for 3G: A Killer Connection

Baawra Ho Gaya Hai Ke Award - Aamir Khan for Dhoom 3

Worst Debut of the Year - Leander Paes for Rajdhani Express

==== Anti-Kela Awards ====
- Go Goa Gone
- Saheb, Biwi Aur Gangster Returns
- Yeh Jawaani Hai Deewani

=== 2015 ===
The winners for the 7th Golden Kela Awards:

Worst Actor (Male) - Arjun Kapoor for Gunday & Everything Else

Worst Actor (Female) - Sonakshi Sinha for Action Jackson and Lingaa and Holiday

Worst Debut - Tiger Shroff for Heropanti

Worst Director - Prabhu Deva for Action Jackson

Worst Film - Humshakals

Most Irritating Song - "Blue Hai Paani Paani" from Yaariyan

Most Atrocious Lyrics - Shabbir Ahmed for "Ice Cream" from The Xposé

Baawra Ho Gaya Hai Ke Award - Abhishek Sharma for The Shaukeens

RGV Ki Aag Award for Most Pointless Remake/Sequel - Bang Bang!

Why Are You Still Trying Award - Sonam Kapoor

Bas Kijiye Bahut Ho Gaya Award - Yo Yo Honey Singh

Dara Singh Award for the Worst Accent - Priyanka Chopra for Mary Kom

Khooni Dracula Award for Most Creatively Named Horror Film - 6-5=2

Shakti Kapoor Award for Misogyny In Film - Action Jackson

Jadoo Award for Most Convincing Looking Alien - Akshay Kumar for Fugly

Fanaa Award for Most Pointlessly Controversial Film - PK

=== 2016 ===
Worst Actor (Male) - Arjun Kapoor for Tevar

Worst Actor (Female) - Sonam Kapoor for Prem Ratan Dhan Payo

Worst Director - Sooraj Barjatya for Prem Ratan Dhan Payo

Worst Film - Prem Ratan Dhan Payo

Most Annoying Song - Prem Ratan Dhan Payo (title track)

Most Atrocious Lyrics - Alfaaz for "Birthday Bash" from Dilliwali Zaalim Girlfriend

Most Pointless Sequel/Remake Award – MSG-2 The Messenger

Why Are You Still Trying Award – Imran Khan

Manoj Kumar Award for Historical "Accuracy" – Bajirao Mastani

Dara Singh Award for Worst Accent - Randeep Hooda for Main Aur Charles

Sangh Parivar Award – "Gerua" from Dilwale

Shakti Kapoor Award for Misogyny – Pyaar Ka Punchnama 2

Bas Kijiye Bahut Ho Gaya Award – Sooraj Barjatya

What The Hell Award – Sonam Kapoor

Bawra Ho Gaya Hai Ke Award – Vikas Bahl for Shaandaar

=== 2017 ===
- Worst Actor (Male): Arjun Kapoor for Half Girlfriend

- Worst Actor (Female): Katrina Kaif for Jagga Jasoos

- Worst Film: Jab Harry Met Sejal

- Worst Director: Imtiaz Ali for Jab Harry Met Sejal

- Most Irritating Song: "Main Tera Boyfriend" from Raabta

=== 2018 ===
- Worst Actor (Male): Salman Khan for Race 3

- Worst Actor (Female): Sonakshi Sinha for Welcome to New York

- Worst Film: Race 3

- Worst Director: Remo D'Souza for Race 3

- Most Irritating Song: "Selfish" from Race 3

=== 2019 ===
- Worst Actor (Male): Arjun Kapoor for India’s Most Wanted

- Worst Actor (Female): Bhumi Pednekar for Saand Ki Aankh

- Worst Film: Kalank

- Worst Director: Abhishek Varman for Kalank

- Most Irritating Song: "Hook Up Song" from Student of the Year 2

=== 2020 ===
- Worst Actor (Male): Varun Dhawan for Coolie No. 1

- Worst Actor (Female): Shraddha Kapoor for Street Dancer 3D

- Worst Film: Sadak 2

- Worst Director: Mahesh Bhatt for Sadak 2

- Most Irritating Song: "Shayad" from Love Aaj Kal

=== 2021 ===
- Worst Actor (Male): Salman Khan for Radhe

- Worst Actor (Female): Ananya Panday for Khaali Peeli

- Worst Film: Laxmii

- Worst Director: Raghava Lawrence for Laxmii

- Most Irritating Song: "Burj Khalifa" from Laxmii

=== 2022 ===
- Worst Actor (Male): Ranveer Singh for Cirkus

- Worst Actor (Female): Jacqueline Fernandez for Attack: Part 1

- Worst Film: Cirkus

- Worst Director: Rohit Shetty for Cirkus

- Most Irritating Song: "Current Laga Re" from Cirkus

=== 2023 ===
- Worst Actor (Male): Akshay Kumar for Bachchhan Paandey

- Worst Actor (Female): Kriti Sanon for Bachchhan Paandey

- Worst Film: Bachchhan Paandey

- Worst Director: Farhad Samji for Bachchhan Paandey

- Most Irritating Song: "Saare Bolo Bewafa" from Bachchhan Paandey

=== 2024 ===
- Worst Actor (Male): Shah Rukh Khan for Pathaan and Dunki

- Worst Actor (Female): Rani Mukerji for Mrs. Chatterjee vs Norway

- Worst Film: Animal

- Worst Director: Karan Johar for Rocky Aur Rani Kii Prem Kahaani

- Most Irritating Song: "Besharam Rang" from Pathaan

=== 2025 ===
- Worst Actor (Male): Kartik Aaryan for Bhool Bhulaiyaa 3

- Worst Actor (Female): Deepika Padukone for Singham Again

- Worst Film: Singham Again

- Worst Director: Siddharth Anand for Fighter

- Most Irritating Song: "Aaj Ki Raat" from Stree 2

=== 2026 ===
- Worst Actor (Male): Kartik Aaryan for Tu Meri Main Tera Main Tera Tu Meri

- Worst Actor (Female): Janhvi Kapoor for Param Sundari

- Worst Film: Saiyaara

- Worst Director: Tarun Mansukhani for Housefull 5

- Most Irritating Song: "Saiyaara Tu Toh" from Saiyaara

These winners represent the consensus for the worst performances in Bollywood as recognized by the Golden Kela Awards over these years.

== See also ==
- Golden Raspberry Awards
- Ghanta Awards
- Youth Film Handbook
