= Jodhaa Akbar (soundtrack) =

Soundtrack album by A. R. Rahman
- Released: 9 January 2008 (digital); 18 January 2008 (physical)
- Recorded: 2005–2007
- Studios: Panchathan Record Inn and AM Studios, Chennai; Nirvana Studio, Mumbai
- Genre: Feature film soundtrack
- Length: 39:43
- Language: Hindi
- Labels: Sony Music India; UTV Motion Pictures
- Producer: A. R. Rahman

A. R. Rahman chronology
Elizabeth: The Golden Age (2007)	Jodhaa Akbar (2008)	Jaane Tu... Ya Jaane Na (2008)

Jodhaa Akbar is the soundtrack album to the 2008 film of the same name directed by Ashutosh Gowariker and starred Hrithik Roshan and Aishwarya Rai Bachchan. The film's musical score and soundtrack is composed by A. R. Rahman with lyrics written by Javed Akhtar.

Jodhaa Akbar is the third collaboration with Rahman and Gowariker. The music discussion were held in early 2005, where Rahman had composed five tunes after the narration of the script. Rahman called it as one of his difficult albums to compose, and had to immerse in the storyline so that he could authentically replicate the period and setting through its music. The album featured influences from Sufi music, qawwali and semi-classical numbers, blending both genres as the film depicted the relationship between Akbar and Jodhaa Bai, which had been explored in the musical landscape.

The soundtrack was released at a launch event held in Mumbai on 9 January 2008, and simultaneously uploaded to digital platforms, while the physical editions of the album were launched on 18 January. The album marked the maiden launch of the record label UTV Music, a subsidiary of the film's distributor UTV Motion Pictures, which released the album through the market with Sony BMG as the publisher.

The music and score received high critical acclaim and fetched numerous accolades including two Filmfare Awards, three International Indian Film Academy Awards, two Apsara Film & Television Producers Guild Awards, one Screen Award and seven Mirchi Music Awards. Rahman received a nomination at the Asian Film Award for Best Composer and also won the V. Shantaram Award for Best Music Director.

== Development ==
The film's musical score and soundtrack is composed by A. R. Rahman in his third collaboration with Gowariker after Lagaan (2001) and Swades (2004). Rahman finalized the tunes after each narration, with Gowariker added that the situations in each antara being screenplay driven. This also made easier for Javed Akhtar to write the lyrics.

The first song he composed for the film was "Azeem-O-Shaan Shahenshah", which Rahman admits that he used a similar pattern and orchestration for a Tamil song, but opined "Azeem-O-Shaan Shahenshah" was far better than the aforementioned song in the film. Rahman utilized drums and percussions as the primary instruments, along with chorus and other voices, he said: "There wasn't a lot of orchestration. It is a drum-and-voice song. Therefore, we did not want to use violins or other instruments in it."

The second song "Jashn-e-Bahara" is a romantic number, depicting Akbar's relationship with Jodhaa Bai. Initially, Gowariker decided to not use the song in this film, and later use it in any of his other films, but Rahman convinced him to use the track. Later, Gowariker suggested Javed Ali, who was then known for singing with Viju Shah, Jatin–Lalit, Shankar–Ehsaan–Loy and Sandesh Shandilya; it was Ali's first collaboration with Rahman. He added that his vocals made the song much special and was of a qawwali-type number that suited it perfectly.

The song "Khwaja Mere Khwaja" was not composed for Jodhaa Akbar. Rahman added that he went to the shrine of Khwaja Mu'in al-Din Chishti for the past fifteen years and wanted to do a song on him for a film, which was impossible. He then composed the tune in 2005 for him to listen. When Gowariker narrated the script and the influences of Sufis and Mu'in al-Din Chishti, he mentioned the song he earlier composed which Gowariker asked him to play for it, and immediately likened to it, wanting it to be used in the film. Gowariker did not change any of Rahman's initial tunes, except for adding interludes and extra vocals for the new version. It was initially titled "Kashif", naming the songwriter, a spiritual person, and added that the song is spiritual to him.

"Ashutosh told me he would use the song in a sequence showing Akbar triumphant [...] He is married to a Rajput princess and he had made an important political alliance. But he also sees a spiritual light as he watches the singers and dancers. It is accompanied with a Rumistic, Sufi kind of dance."

— Rahman, on the use of the song "Khwaja Mere Khwaja"

Rahman composed a semi-classical number "Man Mohana" which was used twice in the film. He described it as a "quite complex composition" on multiple listens. The song was created keeping Aishwarya in mind; Gowariker wanted Aishwarya to sing the song after she hummed a tune in the film's shooting, but due to scheduling problems, the song was recorded it with the vocals of Bela Shende, working with Rahman for the first time. Rahman added that Shende's vocals "had a sense of purity" which led to Gowariker approval of her vocals.

== Release ==
UTV Motion Pictures, the film's primary distributor launched its record label UTV Music, to distribute soundtracks of the films released under their banner. Jodhaa Akbar is the first film soundtrack to be released under the label. The music was launched on 9 January 2008 at the hotel Grand Hyatt Mumbai with the star cast and crew in attendance. The physical CDs of the album were distributed on 18 January 2008. Besides its original version, the album was further dubbed and released in Tamil and Telugu languages, with the change in its singers.

== Reception ==
Sukanya Verma of Rediff.com rated four out of five stars and wrote "Jodhaa Akbar deserves a round of applause for its faithful adherence to melody, vibrant lyrics and musical detailing. At the same time, Rahman and his visionary sensibilities make their presence felt by and large in every note and rhythm. And that's what makes the soundtrack of this history-inspired romance a musical conquest." Karthik Srinivasan of Milliblog commended "The creative freedom Rahman and Ashutosh have sought in this soundtrack may not necessarily reflect the appropriate period in Indian history but makes up by being lavishly inventive and tremendously sweeping."

According to Gautaman Bhaskaran, in his review for The Hollywood Reporter, "Famed Bollywood composer A.R. Rahman’s score is bouncy, but his old touch seems to be missing." Rachel Saitz of The New York Times described it as a "memorable score". Rajeev Masand of CNN-IBN stated that "Jodhaa Akbar benefits enormously from AR Rahman's genius score, a collection of the finest, most haunting tunes you can remember recently", and called "Jashn-e-Bahara" and "Khwaja Mere Khwaja" as his favorites from the album.

According to the Indian trade website Box Office India, with around 1,100,000 units sold, this film's soundtrack album was the year's fourteenth highest-selling.

== Track listing ==
=== Hindi ===
All lyrics are written by Javed Akhtar, except where noted.

No.	Title	Artist(s)	Length
1.	"Azeem-O-Shaan Shahenshah"	Mohammed Aslam, Bonnie Chakraborty, Rahul Nambiar, Gopika Poornima, Fathima	5:54
2.	"Jashn-e-Bahara"	Javed Ali	5:15
3.	"Khwaja Mere Khwaja" (lyrics: Kashif)	A. R. Rahman	6:56
4.	"In Lamhon Ke Daaman Mein"	Sonu Nigam, Madhushree	6:37
5.	"Mann Mohana"	Bela Shende	6:50
6.	"Jashn-E-Bahaara" (Instrumental)	A. R. Rahman, Naveen Kumar	5:15
7.	"Khwaja Mere Khwaja" (Instrumental)	A. R. Rahman	2:53
Total length:			39:43

=== Tamil ===
All lyrics are written by Na. Muthukumar, except where noted.

No.	Title	Artist(s)	Length
1.	"Azeem-O-Shaan Shahenshah"	Mohammed Aslam, Bonnie Chakraborty, Rahul Nambiar, Gopika Poornima, Fathima	5:54
2.	"Muzhumathy"	Srinivas	5:15
3.	"Khwaja Endhan Khwaja (lyrics:Mashook Rahman)"	A. R. Rahman	6:56
4.	"Idhayam Idam Mariyathe"	Karthik, K. S. Chithra	6:37
5.	"Mana Mohana" (lyrics: Mashook Rahman)	Sadhana Sargam	6:50
6.	"Muzhumathy" (Instrumental)	A. R. Rahman, Naveen Kumar	5:15
7.	"Khwaja Endhan Khwaja" (Instrumental)	A. R. Rahman	2:53
Total length:			39:43

=== Telugu ===
All lyrics are written by Rajashri Sudhakar.

No.	Title	Artist(s)	Length
1.	"Azeem-O-Shaan"	Mohammed Aslam, Bonnie Chakraborty, Rahul Nambiar, Gopika Poornima, Fathima	5:54
2.	"Aamani Ruthuve"	Srinivas	5:12
3.	"Manmohanaa"	Sadhana Sargam	6:51
4.	"Thiya Thiyani"	Karthik, Madhushree	6:37
5.	"Khwaja Ma Khwaja"	A. R. Rahman	6:55
6.	"Aamani Ruthuve"	Instrumental	5:12
7.	"Khwaja Ma Khwaja"	Instrumental	2:53
Total length:			39:37

== Awards and nominations ==
Award (Note: Awards, festivals and organizations are in Alphabetical order.)	Date of ceremony (Note: Date is linked to the article about the awards held that year, wherever possible.)	Category	Recipient(s)	Result	Ref.
Asian Film Awards	23 March 2009	Best Composer	A. R. Rahman	Nominated	
Filmfare Awards	28 February 2009	Best Music Director	A. R. Rahman	Nominated	
Filmfare Awards	28 February 2009	Best Background Score	A. R. Rahman	Won	
Filmfare Awards	28 February 2009	Best Lyricist	Javed Akhtar ("Jashn-E-Bahara")	Won	
Filmfare Awards	28 February 2009	Best Male Playback Singer	Sonu Nigam ("Inn Lamho Ke Daaman Mein")	Nominated	
International Indian Film Academy Awards	11–13 June 2009	Best Music Director	A. R. Rahman	Won	
International Indian Film Academy Awards	11–13 June 2009	Best Lyricist	Javed Akhtar ("Jashn-E-Bahara")	Won	
International Indian Film Academy Awards	11–13 June 2009	Best Male Playback Singer	Javed Ali ("Jashn-E-Bahara")	Won	
International Indian Film Academy Awards	11–13 June 2009	Best Female Playback Singer	Bela Shende ("Mann Mohana")	Nominated	
Mirchi Music Awards	28 March 2009	Song of The Year	"Jashn-E-Bahara"	Won	
Mirchi Music Awards	28 March 2009	Male Vocalist of The Year	Javed Ali ("Jashn-E-Bahara")	Won	
Mirchi Music Awards	28 March 2009	Female Vocalist of The Year	Bela Shende ("Mann Mohana")	Won	
Mirchi Music Awards	28 March 2009	Lyricist of The Year	Javed Akhtar ("Jashn-E-Bahara")	Won	
Mirchi Music Awards	28 March 2009	Best Song Arranger & Programmer	TR Krishna Chetan ("Jashn-E-Bahara")	Won	
Mirchi Music Awards	28 March 2009	Best Song Mixing & Engineering	H. Sridhar	Won	
Mirchi Music Awards	28 March 2009	Best Background Score	A. R. Rahman	Won	
Producers Guild Film Awards (Note: Previously known as Apsara Film & Television Producers Guild Awards.)	5 December 2009	Best Music Director	A. R. Rahman	Won	
Producers Guild Film Awards	5 December 2009	Best Male Playback Singer	A. R. Rahman ("Khwaja Mere Khwaja")	Nominated	
Producers Guild Film Awards	5 December 2009	Best Lyricist	Javed Akhtar ("Jashn-E-Bahara")	Nominated	
Producers Guild Film Awards	5 December 2009	Best Re-Recording	Hitendra Ghosh	Won	
Screen Awards	14 January 2009	Best Music Director	A. R. Rahman	Nominated	
Screen Awards	14 January 2009	Best Background Music	A. R. Rahman	Won	
Screen Awards	14 January 2009	Best Lyrics	Kashif ("Khwaja Mere Khwaja")	Nominated	
Screen Awards	14 January 2009	Best Male Playback Singer	A. R. Rahman ("Khwaja Mere Khwaja")	Nominated	
Stardust Awards	15 February 2009	Standout Performance by a Lyricist	Kashif ("Khwaja Mere Khwaja")	Nominated	
Stardust Awards	15 February 2009	New Musical Sensation – Female	Bela Shende ("Mann Mohana")	Nominated	
V. Shantaram Awards	27 December 2008	Best Music Director	A. R. Rahman	Won	
