= Punarnava =

Punarnava may refer to:

- Boerhavia diffusa, a species of flowering plant
- Punarnava Mehta, the moniker of Indian actress Pakhi Tyrewala
