= Purple Pebble Pictures =

Indian film production company

- Type: Privately held company
- Industry: Entertainment
- Founded: 3 March 2015 in Mumbai, Maharashtra, India
- Founder: Priyanka Chopra Jonas
- Headquarters: United States
- Key people: Priyanka Chopra; Sandeep Bhargava - CEO (2015 to 2020)
- Products: Films; Television; AD films
- Services: Film production
- Owner: Priyanka Chopra
- Website: www.purplepebblepictures.com

Purple Pebble Pictures (PPP) is an American film production company originally established in India by actress and producer Priyanka Chopra Jonas. The company aims on producing small budget films and promoting new talent such as writers, actors, directors, and technicians.

In 2016, the company produced the critically acclaimed comedy-drama Ventilator, which won several accolades including three National Film Awards. In 2019, the company's fourth Marathi film, Paani won the National Film Award for Best Film on Environment Conservation/Preservation. The same year, the company released the biographical film The Sky Is Pink which received three Filmfare Awards nominations.

== History ==
"I want to work with new talent. I want to do small films with new directors, new writers and new actors. I know that getting a foothold in the industry is tough and what a struggle it is. I will produce all kinds of regional cinema as well. I have always maintained that promoting regional cinema is important."

— Chopra on her plans for the company

Purple Pebble Pictures was founded by Priyanka Chopra. Under the leadership of CEO Sandeep Bhargava, the company ventured into films, television, and AD films. Chopra had always wanted to produce films but had been waiting for right time due to her immensely busy schedule. In May 2014, it was reported that she would be co-producing Madhur Bhandarkar's political drama Madamji, a film she had signed earlier that year to star in. It was confirmed in August 2014 that Chopra indeed will be producing the film. However, the film was postponed to an unknown date due to full season extension of Chopra's American television series Quantico. She said "Madamji is on hold and this film is very close to my heart. For this film, I have to give 70 days for shoot but since my show got extended, I couldn’t do it. Hopefully, someday I will make it. But right now I am not doing it." In 2024, it was revealed that the company had moved its headquarters to the US as Chopra Jonas' career shifted from Bollywood to Hollywood.

== Production ventures ==
The company released its first project in 2016, the mobile series It's My City, a sitcom about four girls living in an apartment owned by Priyanka Chopra. Co-produced with Endemol Shine India, it guest starred Chopra as herself (an official landlady, unofficial guardian and protective friend to the girls). The company next produced a Bhojpuri film entitled Bam Bam Bol Raha Hai Kashi, which was released in January 2016.

The company next produced the Marathi film Ventilator, which was released on 4 November 2016. The film featured an ensemble cast of more than 100 actors from Marathi cinema and theatre background including Ashutosh Gowariker, and Jitendra Joshi. Written and directed by Rajesh Mapuskar, the film tells the story of a joint family whose eldest and the most respected member is hospitalised before the Ganesh Chaturthi festival. The film received critical acclaim and performed well at the box office. The film received several awards and nominations, including three awards at the 64th National Film Awards: Best Director for Mapuskar, Best Editing and Best Sound Mixing. Ventilator also received 16 nominations at the 2017 Filmfare Marathi Awards, including Best Film and won five awards.

The Punjabi film Sarvann starring Amrinder Gill was released in January 2017. The company next released the Marathi Kay Re Rascalaa in July 2018. Another Bhojpuri film, Kaashi Amarnath was released in October 2018. The Sikkimese film Pahuna: The Little Visitors directed by Pakhi Tyrewala which premiered at the 2017 Toronto International Film Festival, was released in December 2018. The film won a Special Mention in The International Feature Film Category at SCHLINGEL International Children's Film Festival in Germany.

In February 2019, the drama film Firebrand , directed by Aruna Raje, starring Usha Jadhav, Rajeshwari Sachdev, Girish Kulkarni and Sachin Khedekar was released on Netflix. The Assamese film Bhoga Khirikee, directed by Jahnu Barua and starring Zerifa Wahid, Seema Biswas, Sanjay Kharghoria, Kashvi Sharma and Mohammad Ali Shah Qajar in the principal roles premiered at the 2018 Guwahati International Film Festival and is scheduled to be released in 2019. Bhoga Khirikee received three nominations, Best Indie Film, Best Director and Best Actress for Wahid, at the 2019 Indian Film Festival of Melbourne.

The company's another 2019 film Paani, based on a true story exploring the water crisis issue in Maharashtra and directed by debut director Adinath Kothare went on to win the National Film Award for Best Film on Environment Conservation/Preservation at the 66th National Film Awards. This was followed by the biographical film The Sky Is Pink, a co-production with RSVP Movies and Roy Kapur Films, later that year. Directed by Shonali Bose, the film tells the story of Aisha Chaudhary's parents, who are dealing with their daughter's illness (pulmonary fibrosis). The film received generally positive reviews. The film received three Filmfare Awards nominations: Best Film (Critics), Best Actress for Chopra and Best Supporting Actress for Wasim.

=== Upcoming projects ===
Purple Pebble Pictures has several projects at the various stages of production. The company is producing two Bengali films— Brishtir Oppekhyayy and Bus Stop E Keu Nei. In addition, a Bengali-Marathi bilingual film, Nalini, which is based on the romance between Rabindranath Tagore and Atmaram Pandurang's daughter Annapurna is also under production. The company is also producing two Children's films— the Konkani film Little Joe, Kaha Ho? and their first Hindi film Almaseer— both of which will be directed by female directors. Chopra has also signed Aniruddha Roy Chowdhury to direct a Hindi film, which she will be headlining.

In July 2017, the company announced their plans to venture into producing small budget Hollywood films as well, with a project on racism under development. The company will also be co-producing the Malayalam remake of Ventilator after receiving several offers to remake the film in other languages. A Children's film based on stray dogs is also under works.

In November 2026, Priyanka Chopra announced Ventilator 2, which scheduled to be released in 2027.

== Films ==
Year	Title	Director(s)	Language	Notes
2016	Bam Bam Bol Raha Hai Kashi	Santosh Mishra	Bhojpuri	
2016	Ventilator	Rajesh Mapuskar	Marathi	National Film Award for Best Director National Film Award for Best Editing; National Film Award for Best Sound Mixing; Nominated—Filmfare Marathi Award for Best Film
2017	Sarvann	Karaan Guliani	Punjabi	
2017	Kay Re Rascalaa	I Giridhiran	Marathi	
2017	Kaashi Amarnath	Santosh Mishra	Bhojpuri	
2018	Pahuna: The Little Visitors	Pakhi Tyrewala	Nepali	
2019	Firebrand	Aruna Raje	Marathi	
2019	Paani	Adinath Kothare	Marathi	National Film Award for Best Film on Environment Conservation/Preservation
2019	Bhoga Khirikee	Jahnu Baruah	Assamese	
2019	The Sky Is Pink	Shonali Bose	Hindi	Nominated—Filmfare Critics Award for Best Film; Nominated—Filmfare Award for Best Actress; Nominated—Filmfare Award for Best Supporting Actress
2020	Evil Eye	Elan Dassani, Rajeev Dassani	English	
2020	The White Tiger	Ramin Bahrani	English	Nominated—Academy Award for Best Writing (Adapted Screenplay); Nominated—BAFTA Award for Best Adapted Screenplay
2024	To Kill a Tiger	Nisha Pahuja	English	Nominated—Academy Award for Best Documentary Feature Film
2024	WOMB	Ajitesh Sharma	English	
2024	Born Hungry	Barry Avrich	English	
2025	Anuja	Adam J. Graves	English	Nominated—Academy Award for Best Live Action Short Film
2026	The Bluff	Frank E. Flowers	English	Co-produced with AGBO and Cinestar Pictures

== Television ==
Year	Title	Director(s)	Language	Notes
2016	It's My City	—	Hindi	Co-production with Endemol Shine India
2019	If I Could Tell You Just One Thing	Sally Freeman	English	YouTube series hosted by Priyanka Chopra
2026	Hunkkaar	Karan D. Kapadia; Heeraz Marfatia; Nitya Mehra	Hindi	Executive producer
