= Rashid Ali (disambiguation) =

Rashid Ali al-Gaylani (1892–1965) was prime minister of Iraq.

Rashid Ali may also refer to:

- Rashid Ali (singer), Indian singer, guitarist and musician
- Rashid Ali (cricketer, born 1962) (born 1962), Pakistani cricketer for Islamabad
- Rashid Ali (cricketer, born 1980) (born 1980), Pakistani cricketer for Pakistan Reserves
- Rashid Alievich Sunyaev (born 1943), German, Soviet, and Russian astrophysicist of Tatar descent

== See also ==
- Rashied Ali (1933–2009), American free jazz drummer
