= Jashn-e-Bahara =

Song from Jodhaa Akbar

"Jashn-e-Bahaaraa"

Song by Javed Ali

from the album Jodhaa Akbar
- Language: Urdu
- Released: 2007
- Studio: Panchathan Record Inn and A.M. Studios, Chennai
- Genre: Feature film soundtrack
- Length: 5:15
- Label: Sony Music India
- Songwriters: A. R. Rahman; Javed Akhtar
- Producer: A. R. Rahman

Music video
- "Jashn-e-Bahaaraa" on YouTube

"Jashn-e-Bahaaraa" is a song from the 2008 Indian film Jodhaa Akbar, starring Hrithik Roshan and Aishwarya Rai Bachchan which was sung by Javed Ali, composed by A. R. Rahman and written by Javed Akhtar.

== Synopsis ==
"Jashn-e-Bahaaraa" portrays that everything appears wonderful when the person is in love and then, someone enters in the life of the person and changes everything.

== Awards ==
- Mirchi Music Award for Song of The Year at 1st Mirchi Music Awards
- Mirchi Music Award for Lyricist of The Year to Javed Akhtar at 1st Mirchi Music Awards
- Mirchi Music Award for Male Vocalist of The Year to Javed Ali at 1st Mirchi Music Awards
- Best Song Mixing & Engineering to H. Sridhar at 1st Mirchi Music Awards
- Filmfare Award for Best Lyricist to Javed Akhtar at 54th Filmfare Awards
- IIFA Award for Best Lyricist to Javed Akhtar at 10th IIFA Awards
- IIFA Award for Best Male Playback Singer to Javed Ali at 10th IIFA Awards
