= Pahuna: The Little Visitors =

- Poster
- Directed by: Pakhi Tyrewala
- Written by: Pakhi Tyrewala; Biswas Timshina (dialogue)
- Produced by: Priyanka Chopra; Madhu Chopra
- Starring: Ishika Gurung; Anmol Limbu; Manju KC; Saran Rai; Binod Pradhan; Uttam Pradhan; Banita Lagun
- Cinematography: Ragul Dharuman
- Edited by: Sarvesh Kumar Singh
- Music by: Sagar Desai
- Production companies: Purple Pebble Pictures; Children's Film Society of India; Bonfire Tales; Government of Sikkim
- Release date: 7 December 2018 (India)
- Running time: 88 minutes
- Country: India
- Language: Nepali

Pahuna: The Little Visitors is a 2018 Indian Nepali language film set in Sikkim directed by Pakhi Tyrewala and produced by Madhu Chopra and Priyanka Chopra under the banner Purple Pebble Pictures.

== Plot ==
In a remote village in hilly region of Nepal, Several gunshots are heard. The villagers are panicked. They rush to leave the village as soon as possible. While running, husband of Manju tells them to leave from another way and he'll distract the rebels. Manju then leaves the village with her three kids along with other villagers. But soon, Manju returns to the village fearing that her husband might get a gunshot. She hands over her 3 kids to villagers. Among the three kids, Pranay (Anmol Limbu) and Amrita (Ishika Gurung) can walk but the other one, Bishal is just few months old.

The villagers then walk across different hills. And in one night, while the two kids are having dinner, Rai Budo (Mahendra Bajgai) scares the kids telling about Yeti. His intention was to scare kids so they will have their dinner properly but the kids misunderstands. In the middle of the night, the villagers were discussing whether to go Pelling, Sikkim or not. There Rai Budo says the Christians are bad. Rai Budo also tells that the Christian Priest kidnaps the child and eats children. Pranay overhears the conversation and later warns Amrita.

Pranay and Amrita later escape taking Bishal along with them. They decide to take care of Bishal. While walking across the jungle, they come across an abandoned Bus and decide to stay there. They have enough supplies to stay alive for few days. The next morning, they see Christian Priest walking across jungle. Pranay recognizes the priest as he heard the old man saying Priests dress up in white or black wearing a cross sign.

One day, Pranay comes across an old man and tells him that he will help the old man graze his goats. The Old man then gifts him milk daily. Amrita also start working for a pregnant woman. They manage the shifts.

One day, the pregnant woman start feeling unwell as it is time for her delivery. And after delivery, she realizes that Bishal is alone without anyone around . She runs towards the Jungle only to see the van disappeared. When returning from work, Pranay sees the bus being towed and taken away. The driver says him that his brother is taken to Church by the Priest. Pranay says everything to Amrita. So they decide to steal Bishal from the Church. In the church they are scared. When confronted by the priest, they remain quiet. When priest says he will call Police, they ask priest to return their brother after which Priest leaves quietly whereas Pranay and Amrita prepares to attack priest. When the door opens, they are shocked to see their mother. They tell everything to their mom and their mom tells that Priests don't eat kids.

Mom takes the kids to their father. There they see that their father got a gunshot and is recovering. Meanwhile their villagers also arrive and all the Villagers Reconcile.

== Cast ==
- Ishika Gurung as Amrita
- Anmol Limbu as Pranay
- Manju KC as Manju, Mother of three kids
- Saran Rai as Father
- Mahendra Bajgai as Rai Budo
- Binod Pradhan as the Old Man For whom Pranay works for
- Uttam Pradhan
- Banita Lagun

== Awards ==
The film got a Special Mention in The International Feature Film Category at SCHLINGEL International Children's Film Festival in Germany.
