= Paarthale Paravasam =

2001 film by K. Balachander

- DVD cover
- Directed by: K. Balachander
- Written by: K. Balachander
- Produced by: Pushpa Kandaswamy
- Starring: Madhavan; Simran
- Cinematography: A. Venkatesh
- Edited by: Suresh Urs
- Music by: A. R. Rahman
- Production company: Kavithalayaa Productions
- Release date: 14 November 2001
- Country: India
- Language: Tamil

Paarthale Paravasam (transl. Ecstasy, just watching) is a 2001 Indian Tamil-language drama film directed by K. Balachander, for whom this was his 100th film. It was produced by Balachander's home banner Kavithalayaa Productions and stars Madhavan and Simran in the lead roles alongside Raghava Lawrence and Sneha. The film's music was composed by A. R. Rahman, whilst A. Venkatesh was cinematographer. It tells the story of a couple going through a break-up after the husband is exposed for having had a child from a juvenile relationship. It also shows the introduction of love interests for the couple, and if they reconcile, forms the crux of the plot.

Paarthale Paravasam released on 14 November 2001 to mixed reviews and became a commercial failure, even though soundtrack was praised.

== Plot ==
Madhava is a doctor, and a single appearance in a film as an actor has made him the heartthrob of thousands of girls. But he decides not to continue with his film career since he promised to his late father to dedicate his life to medicine and social service.

Madhava married Simi. But a revelation about his past love affair with a college friend with whom he fathered a son causes both his mother and his wife to become furious with him. Soon Simi divorces Madhava, but they continue to remain friends and even go to the extent of fixing each other's second marriages.

Simi decides to get Madhava married to Chella, a nurse at his hospital, while Madhava decides to get Simi married to Azhagu, a professional stage dancer. But in order to convince Azhagu's father to get Azhagu married to Simi, he had to agree with Azhagu's greedy father to give up the land on which he is constructing a hospital for cancer patients.

Madhava and Chella's wedding and Simi and Azhagu's wedding are fixed on the same date. But Azhagu marries one of his cousins on that date on learning about his father's greed. Then Chella's parents find out about Madhava's past and call off the wedding. In the end, Madhava and Simi remarry and Chella marries Kumaran, Madhava's colleague.

== Cast ==
- Madhavan as Dr. Madhava
- Simran as Simi Madhava (Voice dubbed by Savitha Radhakrishnan)
- Raghava Lawrence as Azhagu
- Sneha as Chella (Voice dubbed by Jayageetha)
- Radhika Chaudhari as Rekha (Voice dubbed by Sreeja Ravi)
- Vaali as Bala
- Vivek as Dr. Kumaran
- Nizhalgal Ravi as Mudaliar
- Manivannan as Nellai Amaran
- Seema as Madhava's mother
- Vadivukkarasi as Akilam
- Deepa Venkat as Simi's friend
- Cochin Haneefa
- Mohan Raman
- Mohan Vaidya
- Thalaivasal Vijay
- Kuyili
- Dr. Sharmila
- Viji Chandrasekhar
- Charle
- Dhamu
- Kavithalaya Krishnan
- Mayilsamy
- Periya Karuppu Thevar
- Kamal Haasan as himself (guest appearance)
- Ramya Krishnan as herself (guest appearance)
- Madhan Bob as Kamal Haasan's fan
- Vindhya as dancer in the song "Manmadha Maasam" (uncredited)
- Samuthirakani as Back Pain Patient (uncredited)
- Yuvarani as Miss Chennai Host (uncredited)
- Oorvambu Laxmi as Reporter (uncredited)

== Production ==
Paarthale Paravasam was launched as Balachander's 100th film at his office in Chennai. The original cast announced on the day of the launch included noted singer S. P. Balasubrahmanyam. However, he was replaced by prominent poet Vaali before the shoot started. Moreover, Raju Sundaram was initially supposed to play the role eventually portrayed by Lawrence in the film. Balachandar wanted to launch Asin through his movie after seeing her in an advertisement but her unavailability lead to casting Sneha (actress) for another female lead. Balachandar managed to select Kamal Haasan in a guest appearance, but failed to do the same with Rajinikanth.

Production of the film was delayed multiple times during the shoot owing to rains in Kerala. Balachander also announced that Rahman and Simran's busy scheduled had held up the film's progress. The song "Nee Thaan En Desiya Geetham" was shot in Malaysia featuring Madhavan and Sneha. Some scenes were canned in Taiping. Another was shot at Bekal Fort, Kasargod, in Kerala with Madhavan and Simran, which took five days to finish. The introduction song of Madhavan and a team of dancers was shot in Ooty, while a fourth song sequence, with Madhavan and Simran was on the floors of AVM. The fifth was picturised in the Vijaya Vauhini Studios, in sets where Lawrence and Simran danced for the fifth song.

== Music ==
The soundtrack was composed by A. R. Rahman. Guitarist Rashid Ali had his debut as a vocalist through this film. Nithyasree Mahadevan told about the making one of the songs, "We did not have any lyrics except the words "Manmadha Masam", when Shankar Mahadevan, Rahman Sir and I started it. So we worked on improvisations with those two words and sent the meter to poet Vaali. Vaali Sir was so overwhelmed with the tune that he said he did not want to pollute it with more words. So the song has a very unusual presentation with minimum lyrics." The track "Love Check" was a fusion number that had just two words "Love Check" with Sivamani's drums. The songs were choreographed by Lawrence Raghavendra; "Nee Thaan En Desiya Geetham" was picturised in Malaysia. The song "Azhage Sugama" is loosely based in Sahana raga.

Title	Singer(s)	Lyrics	Duration
"Neethan En Desiya Geetham"	P. Balram, K. S. Chithra	Vaali	3:25
"Adhisaya Thirumanam"	Sujatha Mohan, Sriram Parthasarathy, Kalyani Menon, Sriram Narayan	Vaali	6:17
"Moondrezhuthu"	Harini, Karthik	Vaali	4:51
"Parthale Paravasam"	Ganga Sitharasu, A. R. Reihana, Febi Mani, Fegi, Poornima	Vaali	5:32
"Azhagae Sugama"	Srinivas, Sadhana Sargam	Vairamuthu	5:05
"Azhagae Sugama"-2	Srinivas, Sadhana Sargam	Vairamuthu	4:03
"Love Check"	Anandan Sivamani, Palakkad Sreeram	A. R. Rahman	3:38
"Manmadha Maasam"	Shankar Mahadevan, Nithyasree Mahadevan	Vaali	4:45
"Naadhir Thinna"	Rashid Ali, Thubara	Vaali	5:48

Paravasam was the Telugu dubbed version of this movie. Where lyrics were written by A.M. Ratnam and Shiva Ganesh.

Telugu Track Listing
No.	Title	Singer(s)	Length
1.	"Neevena Jatheeya"	Balaram, K.S. Chitra
2.	"Manmadha Masam"	Shankar Mahadevan, Nithyasree Mahadevan
3.	"Cheliya Kushalama"	S.P. Balasubramaniam, Sadhana Sargam
4.	"Aksharalu Rendaina"	Harini, Karthik
5.	"Paravasam Paravasam"	A.R. Rehna, Ganga, Febi, Poornima
6.	"Atisaya Parinayam"	Kalyani Menon, Sujatha Mohan, Sriram Narayan, Sriram Parthasarathy
7.	"Nadiri Dinna"	Shankar Mahadevan, S.P. Sailaja

== Release and reception ==
The film, upon release on 14 November 2001. Malini Mannath from Chennai Online claimed that the dialogues were "insipid", the narration "lacklustre" and the film was "a monotonous journey for the audience". Similarly, the reviewer from Sify.com labelled the film as "insufferable" and drew criticism to the director and the lead actors, saying that only Vivek's position was the "silver lining". The Hindu wrote "The storyline is the foundation on which an interesting screenplay is built and when the foundation itself is flawed, the exercise makes you weary — especially towards the end." Rajitha of Rediff.com wrote "At the end of it all, you get the feeling that the director failed to keep control of his storyline. Which is very sad, considering the director was known to be a control freak, and his trademark was a gift for intense, gripping storytelling". Visual Dasan of Kalki wrote that the problem is that Balachander, who got into being a little realistic, a little cinematic, and a lot guts, has gotten stuck in dramatic cinema this time. Cinesouth wrote "Most expectations from his 100th movie turned out to be disappointments. As far as KB is concerned, this is neither a complete success, nor a wash out failure".

After the failure of Paarthale Paravasam, Balachander felt that the star cast was the reason for the failure and claimed that if it been made with newcomers it would have been successful.
