= Random Magazine =

Humor magazine

Random Magazine is a humor magazine founded in June 2008. Founder Jatin Varma serves as the magazine's editor.

Random features articles on current events and leading public figures using a satirical approach. The magazine targets men, women and children between the ages of 18 and 36 years in India's urban centers. Random expanded to local-language editions in 2009.

== Random and Channel V ==
Channel [V] has licensed the characters Simpoo Singh and Lola Kutty to Random Magazine for publication every month. SS Sodhi (aka Simpoo Singh) and Lola Kutty were featured in print for the first time in Random Magazine. They have been a part of Random issues since January 2009.

== Random and the Golden Kela Awards ==
The Golden Kela Awards is a satirical take on Bollywood, where awards are given for the worst performances. The Golden Kela Awards was created by Random Magazine and the Sundaas Film Institute in the year 2009. The first annual Golden Kela award ceremony took place on 7 March 2009 at the India Habitat Centre, New Delhi. Jaspal Bhatti made a special appearance at the event, dishonoring the Indian film talent of the year 2008.

== See also ==
- Mad (magazine)
- Golden Raspberry Award
- Pigasus Award
- Darwin Award
