= Jhootha Hi Sahi =

2010 Indian film by Abbas Tyrewala

- Theatrical release poster
- Directed by: Abbas Tyrewala
- Written by: Pakhi Tyrewala
- Produced by: Madhu Mantena; Sanjiv Goenka; Apurv Nagpal; Abbas Tyrewala
- Starring: John Abraham; Paakhi Tyrewala; Raghu Ram
- Cinematography: Manoj Lobo
- Edited by: Shan Mohammed; Antara Lahiri; Chandan Arora (Consulting Editor)
- Music by: A. R. Rahman
- Production companies: Cinergy; Telltale Pictures
- Distributed by: Saregama
- Release date: 22 October 2010
- Running time: 150 minutes
- Country: India
- Language: Hindi
- Budget: ₹35 crore
- Box office: ₹15.6 crore

Jhootha Hi Sahi is a 2010 Indian Hindi-language romantic comedy film co-produced and directed by Abbas Tyrewala under the banner of Saregama. It stars John Abraham, Pakhi Tyrewala, Raghu Ram, Manasi Scott, and Alishka Varde in the lead roles. R. Madhavan makes an extended cameo appearance along with Nandana Sen. The soundtrack and background score were composed by A. R. Rahman.

== Plot ==
Siddharth "Sid" Arya is an average man who owns a bookstore in London named Kagaz Ke Phool alongwith his friends, Omar, a Pakistani and naive but jovial Amit (Omar Khan). His other friends include Omar's pregnant sister Aliya, her boyfriend Nick and Uday who is gay. His girlfriend Krutika, an air hostess, never leaves a chance to dominate him and he gets fed up as a result, but tries his best to keep her happy nevertheless.

One night, Sid starts getting calls from people at night who attempt suicide and learns from Suhana Malik, an NGO volunteer that his number was mistakenly printed on fliers of a suicide helpline, DOST India. Sid offers to volunteer willingly as he has some experience in convincing people and consoling them. He gets a call from Mishka, a beautiful but suicidal woman who was dumped by her ex-boyfriend Kabir, a writer, and is on the verge of taking her life. Mishka discloses her suicidal feelings and then they become phone friends. However, as a rule, Sid must keep his phone identity hidden so Mishka starts calling him "Fidato".

As a coincidence, Mishka comes to Sid's bookstore to buy some books as instructed by Fidato. Despite the awkward first impression at the bookstore, Fidato insists Mishka that she befriend Sid, as it would make her happy and live on with life, to which she agrees. Sid/Fidato and Mishka get closer and bond closely through their night phone calls, where Sid learns that Mishka is a painter by profession and lives all alone, having given up her profession as it reminded her of the hard times with Kabir. Sid/Fidato consoles her and eventually Mishka gets better and decides to start life afresh, thanks to Sid. His friends also realize that Sid is truly in love with Mishka since he never happened to stammer when Krutika is around (Sid stammers whenever he talks to beautiful women, but not on the phone nor with his friends.)

One day, Kabir happens to bump into Mishka while she is sketching. Kabir is shown to be a sadist, who takes any chance to see Mishka suffer, tries to make her feel lonely by introducing his new girlfriend Bhavana, but gets interrupted upon seeing Sid mingling with Mishka. Sid accidentally mentions Kabir by name whereas Mishka had only mentioned Kabir's name to Fidato and not Sid. He somehow handles the situation with Mishka and things patch up. Mishka suspects that Fidato and Sid are the same person since Sid accidentally mentions details that Mishka had only shared with Fidato. She goes with her friend Sushi to the DOST India office, where Sid convinces Suhana to hide his identity, no matter whatever she asks. Suhana reluctantly agrees and the plan succeeds. Sid introduces Mishka to his friends, who invite her to dinner, but Krutika intervenes that night, causing Mishka to become heartbroken upon learning that she is Sid's girlfriend. Sid convinces Omar to pretend he is Krutika's boyfriend and sorts things out with Mishka, while promising that he would never lie to her again.

Kabir meets with an accident and sees this as an opportunity to snatch Mishka back from Sid as he becomes jealous of seeing them hanging out together. He lies to Mishka that he had gotten into a fight with Bhavana and Mishka is all he has. Mishka gets into a fix of choosing Kabir over Sid. Fidato tries to tell Mishka to avoid Kabir as he had only wanted Mishka back so that he can make her suffer. He then gets a call from Ankur, Mishka's neighbour who has a crush on her; he is suicidal due to his parents' quarrel and overdoses on sleeping pills. Fidato immediately tells her to call 999 and runs across the street to ensure that Ankur is taken to hospital. Mishka finds out that Sid is Fidato and breaks up with him, telling him that Fidato means "trustworthy". She moves in with Kabir, who tells her that he would take her to Paris, the place Mishka had longed to visit.

Later Sid visits Ankur and tries to convince Mishka and openly tells her that he loves her, much to Kabir's dismay, and he gets beaten up by him. Mishka stops them and tells her that Sid is "a nobody", which gets him distraught. He then decides to go back to his friends. That night, Mishka and Kabir are en route to the airport when Mishka finally realizes Kabir's true intentions and her love for Sid. She tells Kabir that when she was suicidal and all alone, Sid had given her a reason to live and abruptly ends her relationship with Kabir. Mishka decides to patch up with Sid and calls him to meet her at the London bridge within 10 minutes to prove his love for her. Sid gets overjoyed and together with his friends, rush to the bridge where they are stopped by policemen. His friends distract the police, enabling Sid to reach the bridge, but finds that it had been raised and Mishka decides to leave. Sid does not think even for a second and decides to run to the other side and jumps off the ramp, where he clenches for dear life. His friends and Mishka get worried, but Sid uses his strength and climbs up and rolls down the other side, eventually reaching Mishka. They both reconcile and his friends cheer.

== Cast ==
- John Abraham as Siddharth "Sid" Arya / Fidato
- Pakhi Tyrewala as Mishka
- Raghu Ram as Omar
- Alishka Varde as Aliya
- Manasi Scott as Krutika
- George Young as Nick Yoshihara
- Omar Khan as Amit
- Prashant Chawla as Uday
- Anaitha Nair as Sushi
- R. Madhavan as Kabir (cameo appearance)
- Nandana Sen as Suhana Malik cameo appearance)
- Abheek Sinha as Ankur
- Jodie Fenwick as Dancer (special appearance)
- Anisa Butt as Bhavna

Voice-overs:

- Imran Khan as Akash Dixit / Akshay (Caller No 1)
- Ritesh Deshmukh as Amar (Caller No 2)
- Abhishek Bachchan as Jai (Caller No 3)

== Production ==
The film was originally titled 1-800-Love, later renamed as Call Me Dil and released under the title Jhootha Hi Sahi. The lead actress of the film, Pakhi Tyrewala, is married to the film's director Abbas Tyrewala. R. Madhavan and Nandana Sen make guest appearances in the movie while Imran Khan, Riteish Deshmukh and Abhishek Bachchan lent their voices. The first look billboard poster of the film was unveiled by John Abraham, in a first of its kind on 12 August. The theatrical trailer was unveiled on 27 August 2010 and the music was released on 17 September 2010.

== Release ==
The film was released on 22 October 2010. Earlier it planned to release on 4 July and 15 October, but was delayed since the re-recording of the background score by Rahman took more time than planned.

Indiagames also released a mobile video game based on the film.

== Music ==
The original score and songs of the film were composed by A. R. Rahman with lyrics penned by Abbas Tyrewala. He composed eight tracks for the film; however, a track by Shaan and Sunidhi Chauhan was not featured in the film or soundtrack album. There were rumours that KK and Adnan Sami have recorded songs for the album, but this did not happen. Rahman recorded some of the background score at his K. M. Musiq Studios in Los Angeles. Rahman wrote on a social networking website, "Recorded with a Los Angeles jazz quartet, a couple of whom have played with the likes of Barbra Streisand and Billie Holiday." A few of the songs were recorded in London, while the rest was recorded in Chennai. There were reports that the re-recording of the score took more time than planned and this led to the delayed release of the movie.

== Plagiarism allegations ==
Warner Bros. filed a case of copyright violation alleging that the movie was copied from their television series Friends. The producer of the film, Madhu Mantena, responded that it was not true and that the film had nothing to do with Friends; director Abbas Tyrewala has also denied the allegations.

== Reception ==
=== Critical response ===
Nikhat Kazmi of The Times of India rated it 3.5/5: "The script has a few teasing twists and turns that do not let it fall into the rut of predictable run-of-the-mill romances". Aniruddha Guha of DNA rated it 2/4: "The film may have its moments, but not enough to leave you with a smile at the end. Not even recommended as a date movie". Sukanya Venkatraghavan of Filmfare wrote, "Jhootha Hi Sahi is like an amateur college play where everyone is trying too hard and the writing is just plain cocky, with no depth or direction". Sukanya Verma of Rediff wrote, "John's the best, forget the rest". She gave a 2 out of 5 rating to the movie. Mathures Paul of The Statesman gave the film 2 out of 5 stars, noting, "It really doesn’t matter if Abraham lost a few stones to play Sid, if Pakhi is a good scriptwriter (though she looks like a middle-aged aunt with two left feet), AR Rahman is the music director and Abbas Tyrewala's last film was the modestly successful Jaane Tu Ya Jaane Na. They all work in different directions".

=== Box office ===
By the end of its theatrical run, it had collected ₹ 15.6 crore (156 million) worldwide.
