= Rashid Ali (singer) =

Indian singer and guitarist

- Born: Hyderabad, India
- Occupation: Musician
- Instruments: Vocals; guitar
- Years active: 2002–present

Rashid Ali is an Indian playback singer, guitarist, and composer whose songs are featured in Indian cinema, primarily Hindi films.

== Career ==
Rashid was spotted at a concert in London by A. R. Rahman, who invited him to be part of his Unity of Light concert. There, he performed a jazz-centric fusion of "Ooh La La La," and he has been a regular feature of Rahman's shows since. He started providing vocals for Rahman for Paarthale Paravasam in 2002. He provided vocals to two songs in the coming-of-age romantic comedy film Jaane Tu... Ya Jaane Na, which earned him nominations for playback singer in Filmfare, Stardust, Star Screen Awards, and Radio Mirchi Awards 2008–2009. His songs include "Call Me Dil" and "Cry Cry" from Jhootha Hi Sahi. He is also a professional guitarist, usually associated with Rahman's film soundtracks. He played guitar and provided vocals for Kabhi Kabhi Aditi, for which he composed the introductory guitar riff, "Ishq Ada Hai", and, most recently, he played the steel-string rhythm guitar for "Call Me Dil" from Jhootha Hi Sahi.

Rashid completed his debut album titled Call Me Rashid, produced by Rahman. The music was composed and arranged by Rashid, and Bollywood actress Tabu made her music video debut through this album. Call Me Rashid was launched by Artist Aloud (Hungama Digital Media) on 28 November 2011, with Rahman producing under his own label, KM Music. He also provided vocals for "Sun Lo Zara" with Shreya Ghoshal and "Timmy" for Ek Deewana Tha, released on 16 February 2012.

On 1 November 2012, he performed with Rahman in Bhopal, India, for the anniversary of the formation of Madhya Pradesh. In 2013, Rashid recorded a romantic number for the Raanjhanaa soundtrack, also composed by Rahman. The song is his first duet with Neeti Mohan, entitled "Nazar Laaye". In response to critical acclaim for the song, Rashid produced and released a single featuring Mohan called "Tu Hai" ('Autumn Love').

In November 2014, Rashid launched a series of YouTube videos called 'Rashid's Jam Room' in which he sings and plays guitar, often collaborating with other artists.

In 2015, Rashid collaborated with sitar player and composer Niladri Kumar on an instrumental composition titled "Head to the Heart", a fast-paced original jugalbandi duet of acoustic guitar and sitar.

== Personal life ==
Ali was born in Hyderabad, India, and raised in London. His father is a retired businessman and his mother is a ghazal singer who trained with Ghulam Mustafa Khan.

== Discography ==
Year	Film/Album	Song	Composer
2002	Paarthale Paravasam	"Naadhir Thinna"	A. R. Rahman
2008	ADA...A Way of Life	"Ishq Ada"	A. R. Rahman
2008	Jaane Tu... Ya Jaane Na	"Kabhi Kabhi Aditi" – Nominated for Best Male Playback Singer for Filmfare, Stardust, Star Screen Awards and Radio Mirchi Awards 2008/2009.	A. R. Rahman
2008	Jaane Tu... Ya Jaane Na	"Kahin Toh"	A. R. Rahman
2009	Blue	"Bhoola Tujhe"	A. R. Rahman
2009	Blue	"Yemayyindo Mansukhi Teninnu Manchhiti" (D)	A. R. Rahman
2009	Jaane Kahan Se Aayi Hai	"Keh Do Zara"	Sajid–Wajid
2010	Jhootha Hi Sahi	"Cry Cry"	A. R. Rahman
2010	Jhootha Hi Sahi	"Call Me Dil"	A. R. Rahman
2012	Call Me Rashid	"Ayrilik", "Parda Parda", "Sookhi Nadhi", "Something on Your Mind", "Jin Ke Dhum Se", "Saahil Hai Kinara", "Soch Zara", "Zarra Zarra", "Kabhi Kabhi" (New Version), "Tears of Joy" (Instrumental), "Bailal" (Instrumental), "Saahil Hai Kinara" (Instrumental).	Rashid Ali
2012	Ekk Deewana Tha	"Sun Lo Zara"	A. R. Rahman
2013	Raanjhanaa	"Nazar Laaye"	A. R. Rahman
2013	Single Featuring Neeti Mohan	"Tu Hai" ('Autumn Love')	Rashid Ali
2021	Atrangi Re	"Toofan Si Kudi"	A. R. Rahman
