= Jaane Tu... Ya Jaane Na =

2008 Indian film by Abbas Tyrewala

- Theatrical release poster
- Directed by: Abbas Tyrewala
- Written by: Abbas Tyrewala
- Produced by: Mansoor Khan; Aamir Khan
- Starring: Imran Khan; Genelia D'Souza; Prateik Babbar; Manjari Fadnis; Ayaz Khan; Paresh Rawal; Naseeruddin Shah; Ratna Pathak Shah; Karan Makhija; Alishka Varde; Nirav Mehta; Sugandha Garg; Arbaaz Khan; Sohail Khan; Renuka Kunzru
- Cinematography: Manoj Lobo
- Edited by: Shan Mohammed
- Music by: A. R. Rahman
- Production companies: Aamir Khan Productions; PVR Pictures
- Distributed by: PVR Pictures
- Release date: 4 July 2008
- Running time: 155 minutes
- Country: India
- Language: Hindi
- Budget: ₹15 crore
- Box office: ₹84 crore

Jaane Tu... Ya Jaane Na (transl. Whether You Know Or Not) is a 2008 Indian Hindi-language coming-of-age romantic comedy film written and directed by Abbas Tyrewala and produced by Mansoor Khan and Aamir Khan under Aamir Khan Productions, with Ajay K. Bijli and Sanjeev K. Bijli of PVR Pictures acting as co-producers. The film stars Imran Khan (in his film debut) and Genelia D'Souza with Prateik Babbar (in his film debut), Manjari Fadnis and Ayaz Khan.

Jaane Tu... Ya Jaane Na follows the lives of two best friends Jai and Aditi. They refuse to have romantic feelings but realise their love for each other once they start dating different people. It marked Tyrewala's full-fledged screenwriting and directorial debut. The film's soundtrack was composed by A. R. Rahman with lyrics written by Tyrewala.

The film was theatrically released on 4 July 2008, and proved to be a major commercial success at the box office. Jaane Tu... Ya Jaane Na received positive reviews from critics, with praise towards its direction, story, screenplay, soundtrack, cinematography and cast's performances.

At the 54th Filmfare Awards, Jaane Tu... Ya Jaane Na received 12 nominations, including Best Film, Best Supporting Actress (for Pathak Shah) and Best Supporting Actor (for Babbar), and won 4 awards, including Best Male Debut (for Imran Khan) and Best Music Director (for Rahman).

== Plot ==
The film opens with four friends—Jiggy, Rotlu, Sandhya, and Shaleen—telling air hostess Mala Mishra the story of Jai “Ratz” Rathore and Aditi “Meow” Mahant, their closest friends from college. Jai is gentle and peace-loving, while Aditi is impulsive and outspoken. Though deeply attached, both insist they are not in love and decide to find ideal partners for each other after graduation.

Jai begins dating Meghna Pariyar, whom he meets at a nightclub. She is cheerful but struggles with the impact of her parents’ volatile relationship. As Jai grows close to her, he spends less time with Aditi, who quietly misses his presence. Feeling abandoned, Aditi accepts an arranged engagement to Sushant Modi, a wealthy and assertive young man who initially seems to embody her dream of a “macho” husband.

Tensions rise when Jai skips Aditi’s surprise birthday party to meet Meghna’s parents, and later when Sushant notices Aditi’s lingering feelings for Jai. During a party, Jai and Aditi’s emotions surface when Sushant kisses her while she is visibly upset, further unsettling Jai. Eventually, Jai ends his relationship with Meghna, recognizing her unresolved family trauma.

As Aditi prepares for marriage, Sushant’s controlling nature becomes evident. When he strikes her during an argument, she calls off the engagement and decides to pursue higher studies in New York. Jai, enraged by Sushant’s violence, physically confronts him and is briefly jailed. While in custody, Jai reunites with 2 of his long lost cousins, Vinay "Bagheere" and Kuber "Baloo", after revealing to them that he is the son of Amar Singh Rathore, a Rajput who upheld traditional notions of valor, contrary to what Jai’s mother Savitri had told him. This revelation inspires Jai to embrace his heritage.

Meanwhile, Aditi makes her way to the airport for her flight. Jai, released with the help of his cousins, borrows a horse to reach her before departure. At the airport, dodging the security, he confesses his love by singing the song he once promised to dedicate to his true partner. Aditi reciprocates, abandoning her plans to leave, and Prakash, a security officer, warns Jai against pulling such a stunt like that ever again.

The story returns to the present, where the friends conclude their tale as Jai and Aditi arrive together at the airport, now a couple. Mala is moved by their reunion, and the group leaves together.

== Cast ==
- Imran Khan as Jai Singh Rathore "Ratz" & "Mowgli"
- Genelia D'Souza as Aditi "Meow" Mahant
- Ayaz Khan as Sushant Modi, Aditi's fiancé
- Prateik Smita Patil as Amit Mahant, Aditi's brother
- Nirav Mehta as Jignesh "Jiggy" Patel
- Alishka Varde as Sandhya "Bombs" Sahay
- Karan Makhija as Ravindra "Rotlu" Sahu
- Sugandha Garg as Shaleen Verma
- Manjari Fadnis as Meghna Pariyar, Jai's girlfriend
- Murali Sharma as CISF Inspector Prakash Suman
- Padam Bhola as Vivek "Pappu" Kapoor
- Ratna Pathak as Savitri Singh Rathore, Jai's mother
- Naseeruddin Shah as Amar Singh Rathore, Jai's father
- Paresh Rawal as Inspector P. K. Waghmare
- Sohail Khan as Vinay "Bagheere" Singh Rathore, Jai's long-lost cousin and Baloo's brother
- Arbaaz Khan as Kuber "Baloo" Singh Rathore, Jai's long-lost cousin and Bagheere's brother
- Renuka Kunzru as Mala Mishra, Jiggy's date
- Anuradha Patel as Vishakha "Pumpkin" Mahant, Aditi's mother
- Jayant Kripalani as Vishwas "Peachy" Mahant, Aditi's father
- Kitu Gidwani as Sheela Pariyar, Meghna's mother
- Rajat Kapoor as Mahesh Pariyar, Meghna's father
- Shakun Batra as Nilesh "Pappu" Pandit, Vivek's friend
- Urvashi Shah as Richa, Sushant's ex-girlfriend

== Production ==
=== Development ===
Jaane Tu... Ya Jaane Na was first announced by producer Jhamu Sugandh, who later offered the script to Aamir Khan, after facing financial difficulties. Khan's production then announced the film in 2007. The film marks Abbas Tyrewala's directorial debut. He also worked as the writer and lyricist for the film. The title of the film is taken from a song of the same name from the 1973 Hindi film Aa Gale Lag Jaa.

=== Casting ===
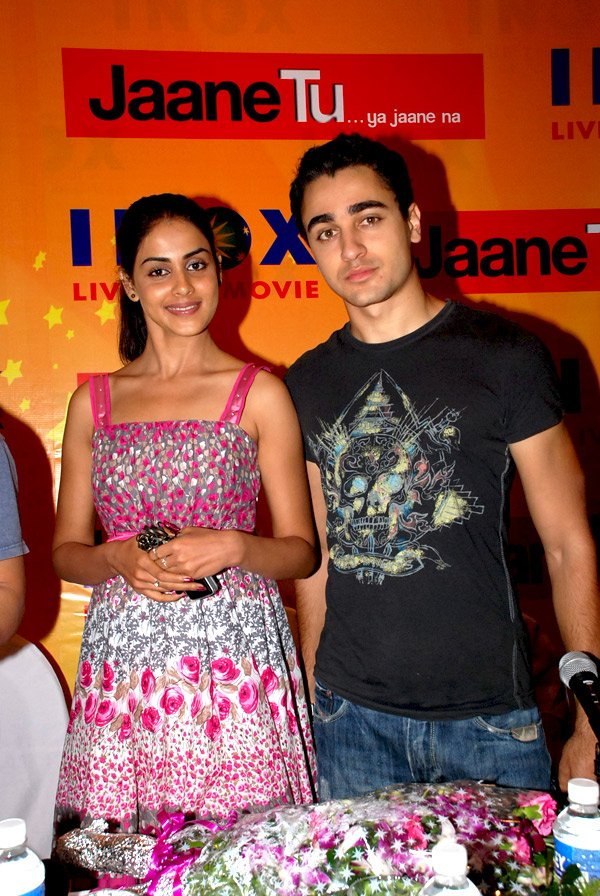
The film marked Khan's debut and D'Souza's return to Hindi films

Aamir Khan's nephew Imran Khan was cast as the lead, Jai, marking his acting debut. Genelia D'Souza was cast as the other lead, Aditi. It marks Genelia's comeback to Hindi films after a long hiatus.

Smita Patil and Raj Babbar's son Prateik Babbar was cast as Aditi's brother, Amit marking his acting debut too. Nirav Mehta, Alishka Varde, Karan Makhija and Sugandha Garg were cast as Jai and Aditi's friends. Manjari Fadnis was cast as Jai's girlfriend in her third Hindi film, while Ayaz Khan was cast as Aditi's fiancé. Ratna Pathak Shah and Naseeruddin Shah were cast as Jai's parents. While, Murali Sharma, Paresh Rawal, Sohail Khan and Arbaaz Khan were cast in other prominent roles. Assistant director Shakun Batra was cast as Nilesh "Pappu" Pandit in his only acting role to credit; he would later make his screenwriting and directorial debut with Imran-starrer Ek Main Aur Ekk Tu (2012).

=== Filming ===
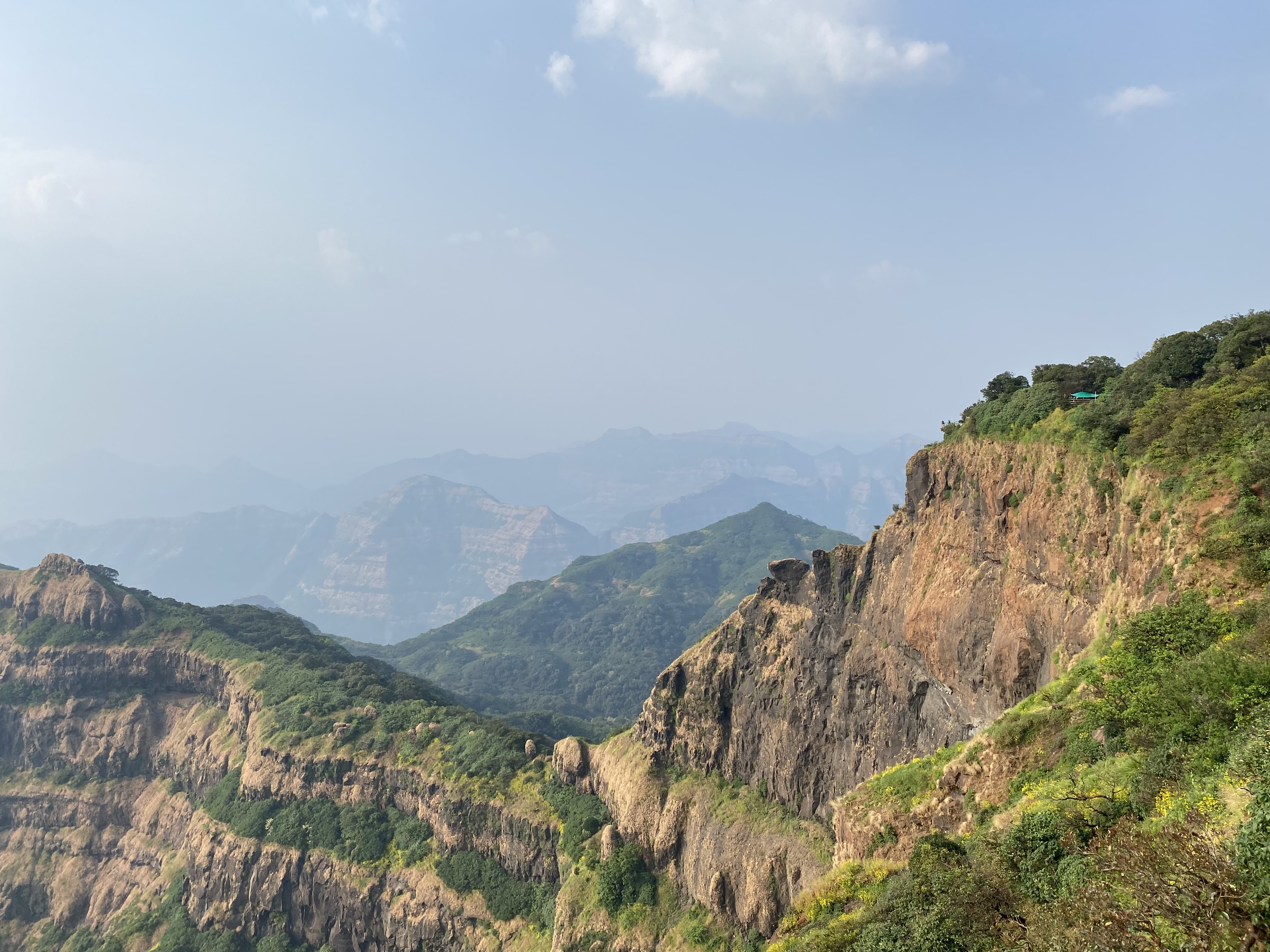
The song "Nazrein Milana Nazrein Churana" was shot in Mahabaleshwar

The principal photography for the film commenced in 2007 and was primarily shot in Mumbai. The college scenes were shot at St. Xavier's College. Some major portions were filmed at Castella de Aguada, Bandra–Worli Sea Link and South Bombay. The film's song "Nazrein Milana Nazrein Churana" was entirely shot in Mahabaleshwar.

== Soundtrack ==
The music of Jaane Tu... Ya Jaane Na, composed by A. R. Rahman with lyrics by Abbas Tyrewala, was released in India on 21 May 2008 with producer Aamir Khan presenting the first audio CD to veteran actor Shammi Kapoor. Rahman was awarded with the Filmfare Award for Best Music Director and the Screen Award for Best Music Director for the soundtrack. The track "Kabhi Kabhi Aditi" was nominated for Best Lyricist (Tyrewala) and Best Male Playback Singer (Rashid Ali) at the Filmfare Awards. According to the Indian trade website Box Office India, with around 15,00,000 units sold, this film's soundtrack album was the year's eighth highest-selling.

== Release ==
Following all the post-production work, Aamir Khan took on digital promotion head-on with pop-up ads on various portals, for the film. Jaane Tu... Ya Jaane Na was released on 4 July 2008. The premiere of the film was held at the PVR Cinemas in Goregaon, Mumbai with the director, cast and crew in attendance as well as a large number of Bollywood stars including Anil Kapoor, Sonam Kapoor, Minissha Lamba, Raveena Tandon, Ashutosh Gowariker, Jackie Shroff, Subhash Ghai, Shekhar Kapur, Sridevi, Boney Kapoor, Yash Chopra, Pamela Chopra and Amitabh Bachchan. The film was released with 473 prints worldwide, which includes 282 analogue prints, 81 digital screens and 110 prints overseas. In its second week, the number of shows at multiplexes were increased while 100 more centres were opened.

== Reception ==
=== Critical response ===
Jaane Tu... Ya Jaane Na received widespread critical acclaim upon release. Raja Sen of Rediff.com gave it a 4 out of 5, praising it for "a rock-solid ensemble cast that is mouthwateringly perfect". Prasanna Zore of Rediff gave the film 3.5 out of 5, writing "Jaane Tu... Ya Jaane Na, written and directed by Abbas Tyrewala (who scripted the fun Munna Bhai series, Main Hoon Na and Maqbool among others) is a fun-filled, engaging entertainment. Rarely do you feel bored as four friends narrate the love story of the protagonists – Jai and Aditi – to a bored newcomer, who joins the group by the time the film ends."

Taran Adarsh of IndiaFM gave it 3.5 stars, and called it "a breezy entertainer which will be loved by its target audience – the youth". Khalid Mohamed of Hindustan Times gave the film 3.5 out of 5, writing "There's enough comfort food on the platter. Tyrewala's dialogue as well as first-time direction are skillful, with his cinematographer Manoj Lobo using the close-up lens brilliantly. A. R. Rahman's music score is remarkably bouncy, especially the 'Kabhi Kabhi Aditi' and 'Pappu Can't Dance Saala' tracks". Shubhra Gupta of The Indian Express wrote, "In his sparkling debut feature, Abbas Tyrewala has his lead pair slapping backs rather than kissing cheeks, but he knows and we know that that's where Jaane Tu.. Ya Jaane Na is headed, even before its starts. The journey is cleverly-written, smartly-acted, and packed with enough fuzzy-frothy moments to make it a fun run".

=== Box office ===
Jaane Tu... Ya Jaane Na was an early success, with 80% or more in morning shows and 100% by the noon shows across India. Monday usually witnesses a drop in business for films in India, but Jaane Tu... Ya Jaane Na had strong showings on Monday (75%), Tuesday (70%) and Wednesday (60%+). The first week all-India gross was ₹200.1 million (US$2.1 million) with an average of ₹656,524 per print. For the second week, the number of shows were increased and it started the week grossing almost 100% at several screens. The film grossed ₹175 million (US$1.9 million) in its second week, taking its total to ₹375 million (US$4.0 million). Jaane Tu... Ya Jaane Na grossed approximately ₹840 million (US$9.0 million) in full run. When adjusted for inflation, the film is still among the highest grossers worldwide.

== Accolades ==
Award	Date of ceremony (Note: Date is linked to the article about the awards held that year, wherever possible.)	Category	Recipient(s)	Result	Ref.
Filmfare Awards	28 February 2009	Best Film	Jaane Tu... Ya Jaane Na	Nominated	
Filmfare Awards	28 February 2009	Best Supporting Actress	Ratna Pathak Shah	Nominated	
Filmfare Awards	28 February 2009	Best Supporting Actor	Prateik Babbar	Nominated	
Filmfare Awards	28 February 2009	Best Male Debut	Prateik Babbar	Nominated	
Filmfare Awards	28 February 2009	Best Male Debut	Imran Khan	Won	
Filmfare Awards	28 February 2009	Best Music Director	A. R. Rahman	Won	
Filmfare Awards	28 February 2009	Best Lyricist	Abbas Tyrewala for "Kabhi Kabhi Aditi"	Nominated	
Filmfare Awards	28 February 2009	Best Male Playback Singer	Rashid Ali for "Kabhi Kabhi Aditi"	Nominated	
Filmfare Awards	28 February 2009	Best Screenplay	Abbas Tyrewala	Nominated	
Filmfare Awards	28 February 2009	Best Dialogue	Abbas Tyrewala	Nominated	
Filmfare Awards	28 February 2009	Best Choreography	Longines Fernandes for "Pappu Can't Dance Saala!"	Won	
Filmfare Awards	28 February 2009	Special Jury Mention	Prateik Babbar	Won	
Mirchi Music Awards	28 March 2009	Album of The Year	A. R. Rahman, Abbas Tyrewala	Won	
Mirchi Music Awards	28 March 2009	Music Composer of The Year	A. R. Rahman	Won	
Mirchi Music Awards	28 March 2009	Listeners' Choice Song of the Year	"Kabhi Kabhi Aditi"	Won	
Mirchi Music Awards	28 March 2009	Listeners' Choice Album of the Year	Jaane Tu... Ya Jaane Na	Won	
Screen Awards	14 January 2009	Best Film	Jaane Tu... Ya Jaane Na	Nominated	
Screen Awards	14 January 2009	Best Director	Abbas Tyrewala	Nominated	
Screen Awards	14 January 2009	Best Dialogue	Abbas Tyrewala	Nominated	
Screen Awards	14 January 2009	Most Promising Debut Director	Abbas Tyrewala	Nominated	
Screen Awards	14 January 2009	Best Actress	Genelia D'Souza	Nominated	
Screen Awards	14 January 2009	Best Actress (Popular Choice)	Genelia D'Souza	Nominated	
Screen Awards	14 January 2009	Best Supporting Actress	Ratna Pathak Shah	Nominated	
Screen Awards	14 January 2009	Most Promising Newcomer - Male	Imran Khan	Nominated	
Screen Awards	14 January 2009	Most Promising Newcomer - Male	Prateik Babbar	Nominated	
Screen Awards	14 January 2009	Best Music Director	A. R. Rahman	Won	
Screen Awards	14 January 2009	Best Male Playback	Rashid Ali for "Kabhi Kabhi Aditi"	Nominated	
Screen Awards	14 January 2009	Best Choreography	Rajeev Surti for "Kabhi Kabhi Aditi"	Nominated	
Producers Guild Film Awards (Note: Previously known as Apsara Film & Television Producers Guild Awards.)	5 December 2009	Best Film	Jaane Tu... Ya Jaane Na	Nominated	
Producers Guild Film Awards	5 December 2009	Best Director	Abbas Tyrewala	Nominated	
Producers Guild Film Awards	5 December 2009	Best Dialogue	Abbas Tyrewala	Nominated	
Producers Guild Film Awards	5 December 2009	Best Screenplay	Abbas Tyrewala	Nominated	
Producers Guild Film Awards	5 December 2009	Best Actress in a Leading Role	Genelia D'Souza	Nominated	
Producers Guild Film Awards	5 December 2009	Best Male Debut	Imran Khan	Won	
Producers Guild Film Awards	5 December 2009	Best Music Director	A. R. Rahman	Nominated	
Producers Guild Film Awards	5 December 2009	Best Lyricist	Abbas Tyrewala	Nominated	
Producers Guild Film Awards	5 December 2009	Best Male Playback Singer	Rashid Ali for "Kabhi Kabhi Aditi"	Nominated	
Producers Guild Film Awards	5 December 2009	Best Female Playback Singer	Anupama, Tanvi, Darshana for "Pappu Can't Dance Saala!"	Nominated	
Producers Guild Film Awards	5 December 2009	Best Choreography	Longines Fernandes for "Pappu Can't Dance Saala!"	Nominated	
Stardust Awards	15 February 2009	Hottest Film of The Year	Jaane Tu... Ya Jaane Na	Nominated	
Stardust Awards	15 February 2009	Hottest New Filmmaker	Abbas Tyrewala	Nominated	
Stardust Awards	15 February 2009	Superstar of Tomorrow – Male	Imran Khan	Nominated	
Stardust Awards	15 February 2009	Superstar of Tomorrow – Female	Genelia D'Souza	Nominated	
Stardust Awards	15 February 2009	Breakthrough Performance – Male	Prateik Babbar	Won	
Stardust Awards	15 February 2009	Breakthrough Performance – Female	Manjari Phadnis	Won	
Stardust Awards	15 February 2009	New Musical Sensation – Male	Benny Dayal for "Pappu Can't Dance Saala!"	Won	

== Legacy ==
Jaane Tu... Ya Jaane Na remains one of the most popular romantic comedies in Hindi cinema. It was named among Bollywood's top 10 most romantic movies by Vogue and Filmfare. Jaane Tu... Ya Jaane Na is also considered among the best films made on friendship. Film Companion added Naseeruddin Shah and Ratna Pathak Shah's characters in its "50 Memorable Bollywood Characters" list.

The song "Pappu Can't Dance Saala" has been used in a scene in the 2010 film Peepli Live, also produced by Aamir Khan. The 2011 film Pappu Can't Dance Saala, starring Vinay Pathak and Neha Dhupia, has taken its name from the film's song of the same name.

== See also ==
- List of highest-grossing Bollywood films
- List of Hindi films of 2008
