= Ek Main Aur Ekk Tu =

2012 Indian film by Shakun Batra

- Theatrical release poster
- Directed by: Shakun Batra
- Written by: Ayesha Devitre; Shakun Batra
- Produced by: Hiroo Yash Johar; Karan Johar; Ronnie Screwvala
- Starring: Imran Khan; Kareena Kapoor; Ratna Pathak Shah; Boman Irani; Ram Kapoor
- Cinematography: Donald McAlpine
- Edited by: Asif Ali Shaikh
- Music by: Songs: Amit Trivedi; Score: Clinton Cerejo
- Production companies: UTV Motion Pictures; Dharma Productions
- Distributed by: UTV Motion Pictures
- Release date: 10 February 2012
- Running time: 111 minutes
- Country: India
- Languages: Hindi; English
- Budget: ₹360 million
- Box office: ₹721 million

Ek Main Aur Ekk Tu (transl. That's me and you) is a 2012 Indian Hindi-language romantic comedy film directed and co-written by Shakun Batra in his directorial debut and produced by Karan Johar and Hiroo Yash Johar under the banner of Dharma Productions, alongside Ronnie Screwvala of UTV Motion Pictures. The film stars Imran Khan and Kareena Kapoor, with Ratna Pathak Shah, Boman Irani and Ram Kapoor in supporting roles. The plot centers on an uptight architect named Rahul Kapoor, living in Las Vegas, Nevada, who loses his job and, following a night of debauchery, accidentally marries a free-spirited hairstylist named Riana Braganza. After mutually deciding to annul the marriage, Rahul begins a one-sided attraction for Riana, which threatens to ruin their new friendship.

Development began in 2010, when Johar signed Batra and Khan for a film to be made under his banner. Inspired by the Woody Allen style of film-making, Ayesha Devitre and Batra worked on the script, with principal photography taking place in Vegas, Los Angeles, Pataudi and Mumbai. The film features music by Clinton Cerejo and Amit Trivedi, with the former composing the score and the latter composing the songs. The lyrics for songs were written by Amitabh Bhattacharya. Originally slated to release during the fall of 2011, Ek Main Aur Ekk Tu eventually released on 10 February 2012, to positive critical reception, with major praise directed towards the lead pair's performance, and proved a moderate commercial success.

== Plot ==
Rahul Kapoor, an architect, has always been on the road to perfection as per the wishes of his domineering father, Sushil Kapoor, and socialite mother, Seema Kapoor. After suddenly losing his job in Vegas, he hides the truth from his parents and looks for another job. Unable to cope with unemployment, he goes to a psychologist and runs into another patient, Riana Braganza. A series of events lead Riana to believe that he is sent by her ex-boyfriend to stalk her, and she ends up taking his file by mistake.

Riana, who later realises her mistake, calls him and apologises for her behaviour. They meet up on Christmas Eve, and Riana invites Rahul to have a few drinks with her. A few drinks turn into a night of intoxicated revelry, and they end up marrying each other. Horrified the following morning, they decide to get it annulled as soon as possible. Meanwhile, Riana, who is also unemployed and has not paid her rent, loses her accommodation, and an initially hesitant Rahul lets her stay with him till her problem gets resolved. During these few days, they get to know each other better. Rahul is revealed to be interested in photography, while Riana recounts her ambition to be a ballet dancer, which was destroyed after she broke her ankle in childhood. Their friendship develops as Riana gives Rahul the long break he always wanted. As they grow closer, Rahul develops feelings for Riana, who fails to reciprocate them.

As New Year's Eve approaches, Riana plans to visit her family in India and asks Rahul to accompany her. He disagrees initially, as his parents live in Mumbai, but later gives in. Upon arrival, she introduces him to her family, making his feelings towards her grow. The next day, Riana takes him to visit her school. Amidst reflecting on her past relationships, he unsuccessfully tries to kiss her. Realising that she does not feel the way he does, he angrily leaves the school, only to almost run into a car revealed to be his mother's. He lies and tells his mother that he is in India for a research trip and that Riana is a colleague. They have lunch with Rahul's parents, where he spins a web of intricate lies to avoid telling his father the truth. He leaves Riana's house and returns to his parents, trying to tell them the truth, but once again is overpowered by his father.

Two days later, during a family dinner, Rahul angrily divulges the complete truth to his parents, who are in denial, and their business partners, after realising the meaninglessness of his pretense. He rushes back to Riana to apologise for his behaviour while Riana apologises she never intended to lead him on. After a night of reflection and deep conversation, they decide to maintain their friendship.

The duo return to Las Vegas and finalise their annulment. Rahul gets a new job while making time for photography. He remains hopeful that one day he will convince Riana to go back to that chapel with him. Both remain good friends, with an ending note from Rahul claiming that he is finally happy with his life, as the credits roll.

== Cast ==
- Imran Khan as Rahul Kapoor
- Kareena Kapoor as Riana Braganza (Ri)
- Ratna Pathak Shah as Seema Kapoor
- Boman Irani as Sushil Kapoor
- Ram Kapoor as D. K. Bulani
- Dana Lewis as Dayna Bulani
- Rajesh Khattar as Mr. Shah
- Nikhil Kapoor as Phil Braganza
- Zenobia Shroff as Nicole Braganza
- Manasi Scott as Steffy
- Mukul Chadda as Karan Sharma
- Avantika Malik (Cameo)

== Production ==
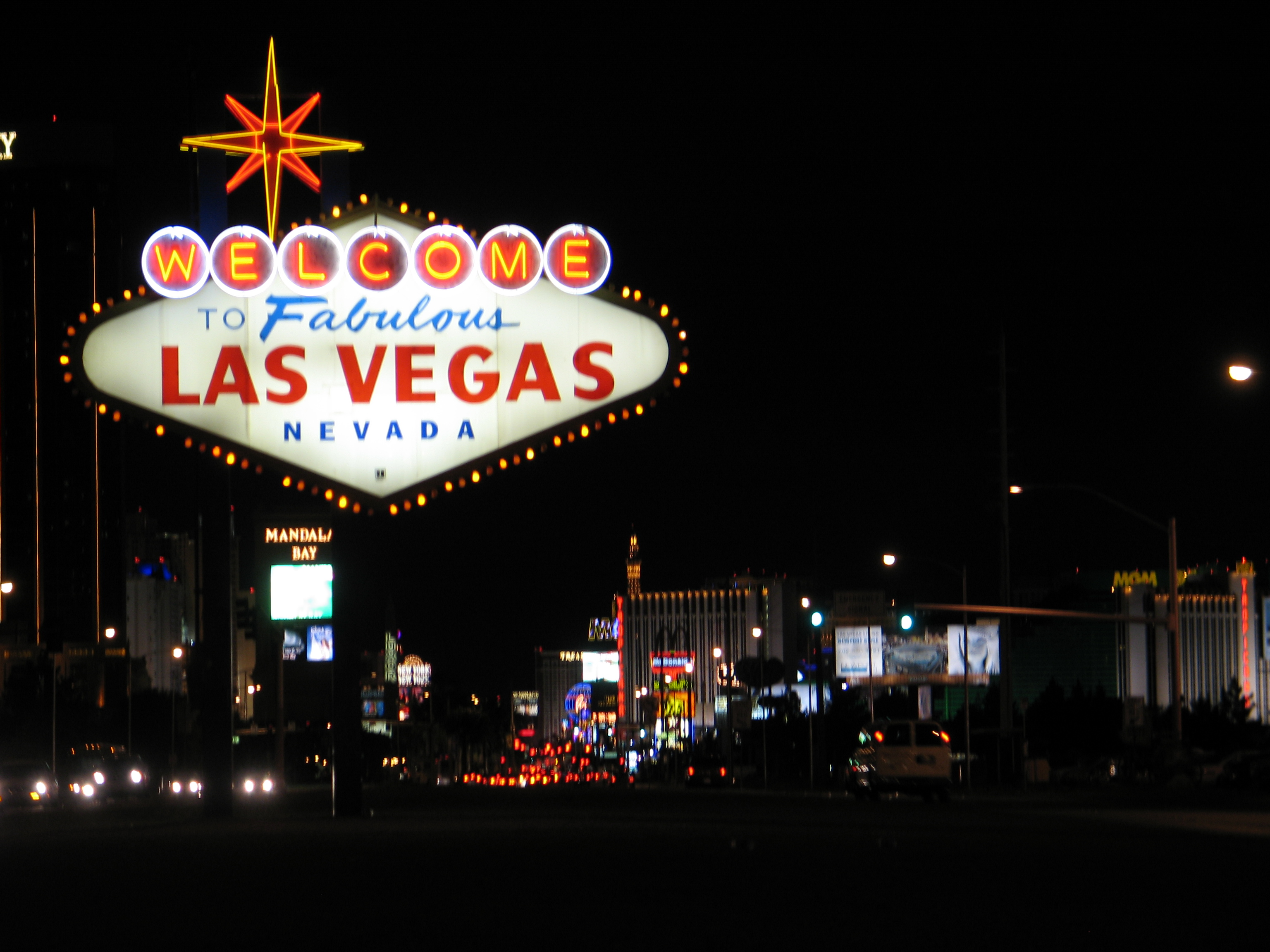
A major part of Ek Main Aur Ekk Tu was set in Las Vegas, Nevada.

Pre-production work on Ek Main Aur Ekk Tu began in 2010 when Karan Johar announced his plans of making a new project with debutant Shakun Batra. Following the success of their previous collaboration I Hate Luv Storys (2010), Khan was contracted by Johar to play the male lead. In an attempt to sign in an actress who had never worked with Khan before, Kapoor was confirmed to play the female lead several days later. She had to cut her hair short and sport red streaks for her role. On casting Khan and Kapoor, Johar commented, "They could get their real life personality onto the film. Imran is meant to be this very perfectionist young man. So while he is a very stuffy kind of a character, he is also very focused and doesn't let himself go. On the other hand Kareena plays this woman who is like a modern version of Geet from Jab We Met."

Batra mentioned, "It's a slice of life film, driven by characters. The plot is not primary, emotions of the characters are at the forefront. It is set on two weeks of the life of two characters, played by Imran and Kareena." On the other hand, Johar said it was inspired by the Woody Allen style of film-making. He added that there would be "lot more conversation happening here" and there would be "these walk-talk sequences where it is just you and the camera in motion."

Principal photography commenced in November 2010 in Las Vegas, Nevada after Khan had completed working on Mere Brother Ki Dulhan and later continued in Los Angeles. After completing the film's first schedule, the crew shifted to shoot in Pataudi, in the Indian state of Haryana, followed by Mumbai. As photography began in Vegas, media sources began to report that it could be an adaptation of the American romantic comedy, What Happens in Vegas (2008). Johar, however, went on to deny these reports, claiming that, if he wanted to remake the film, he would have bought the rights to it. Originally referred to as Short Term Shaadi, the title and first look was launched by Johar in August 2011 via Twitter. According to him, "Short Term Shaadi was just a working title that attached itself to this film through the making. Neither the director nor I were happy with it from the start." The name Ek Main Aur Ekk Tu was derived from a song from the Rishi Kapoor and Neetu Singh starrer Khel Khel Mein (1975).

On deciding to set the stot in Vegas, Batra said that "the character of the place is very well defined and we need to show it as Las Vegas. It can't be shown as any other city. Since most films are not set there, it gets difficult. In case of Ek Main Aur Ekk Tu, our film is set in Las Vegas and Mumbai." As filming took place during the winter in Vegas, the production team shot for double shifts to be cost effective.

== Soundtrack ==
The music rights of Ek Main Aur Ekk Tu were sold to T-Series for ₹60 million (US$640,000), making it the first Dharma Productions soundtrack to not be owned by Sony Music India since 1998. The soundtrack, which released on 25 December 2011, featured music composed by Amit Trivedi with lyrics by Amitabh Bhattacharya.

== Release and reception ==
The film released worldwide on 10 February 2012, coinciding with Valentine's Day celebrations. Upon release, Ek Main Aur Ekk Tu received positive reviews and was a moderate box office success.

The trailers of Ek Main Aur Ekk Tu faced trouble with the censor board before release. Initially, the word "sex" was objected to by the board and asked to be removed. Later, a scene depicting Kapoor pinching Khan's buttocks was considered inappropriate for television promos and had to be removed.

=== Critical reception ===
Rachel Saltz of The New York Times noted, "The happy surprise of Ek Main aur Ekk Tu is that it's not crude, sniggering or vindictive. Instead it's rather sweet and sometimes even a little unexpected." Avijit Ghosh of The Times of India gave 4 out of 5 stars and said that, "Ek Main Aur Ekk Tu is the sweetest heartbreak that Bollywood has conjured in a long, long time." Taran Adarsh of Bollywood Hungama also gave 4 out of 5 stars saying, "This take on love is refined, smart, lively and thoroughly pleasing thanks to its characters, conversations and the inherent humor." Piyali Dasgupta of NDTV, in her 4-star review, explained, "I'll play on the film's USP for this review and keep it short and crisp. No extra lines. But, just like you need to read this, you need to go and watch the film." DNA India recommended it and gave 4 stars out of 5 concluding, "All in all, Ek Main Aur Ekk Tu is a delightful film that keeps getting better along the way, and ends fabulously. Clocking under two hours, the film is a breezy watch that will leave you with a smile."

MiD DAY gave 3.5 stars out of 5, commenting, "The climax is brave, unpredictable and real. Go watch! Ek Main Aur Ekk Tu is a small packet of joy." India Today, too, gave 3.5 stars out of 5 saying, "Ek Main Aur Ekk Tu is a gentle little film, where even the regulation song with Americans dancing to Bollywood music in the middle of Vegas don't look so bad." A review carried by Birmingham Mail mentioned,

Director Shakun Batra's film is a light-hearted watch depicting subjects like opposite attractions and modern-day relationships. It is refreshing to see the film not falling prey to melodramatic moments and over-the-top acting; so typical of Bollywood rom-coms. This is due to the casual and carefree dialogues flowing smoothly without a drowning background score. Imran Khan has impeccable comic timing as the highly-strung guy with straight-faced expressions. He effortlessly portrays the various shades of his character, be it the obedient son, an inexperienced bachelor or a man who has just discovered the world is his oyster. The beautiful and adorable Kareena Kapoor never goes overboard as the sociable and vibrant hairdresser unlike her character in Jab We Met.

Daily Bhaskar gave 3 out of 5 stars and concluded saying, "Overall, Ek Main Aur Ekk Tu is a typical popcorn entertainment with super-amazing climax which puts it in a different league altogether." Sukanya Verma for Rediff too gave the film 3 stars out of 5, and commented, "Ek Main Aur Ekk Tu is neither on the epic side like Dharma Productions' great, grand ancestors nor weighed down by an overload of pop culture references of those that define the genre." Komal Nahta for Koimoi, too, gave 3 out of 5 stars, saying Ek Main Aur Ekk Tu is an entertaining and enjoyable fare for the city audience. Rajeev Masand of CNN-IBN gave it 3 out of 5 stars and said "Ek Main Aur Ekk Tu is a narrative that unfolds mainly through dialogue, and the lighter moments come at you as the odd couple gets to know each other. The humor hits the mark many times and falls flat occasionally, but the movie doesn't grate because the characters aren't trying too hard to be cute."

The Economic Times gave 2.5 stars out of 5, and said "It's perfect in whatever it offers. But what it offers is quite average in volume." Shubhra Gupta of The Indian Express gave 2.5 stars out of 5 and said "The film passes by pleasantly enough past all its expected roadsigns, providing a smile and an occasional chuckle but making you wish for more newness."

On the contrary, Kunal Guha of Yahoo! gave 2 stars out of 5, saying "this film doesn't subscribe to every cliché associated with this auspicious day for getting Main and Tu to become Hum."

=== Box office ===
Ek Main Aur Ekk Tu opened well in multiplexes in North India, while other areas had an average opening at multiplexes. On its first day, it earned about ₹52.5 million (US$560,000) nett, with major collections coming from Mumbai, Delhi NCR, Punjab and Mysore. It collected ₹72.5 million (US$770,000) nett on Saturday, while ₹85.0 million (US$910,000) on Sunday, hence totaling its first weekend collection around ₹210 million (US$2.2 million).

On Monday, the film netted around ₹25.0 million (US$270,000), with a 50% drop in collections as compared to first day. On Tuesday, Ek Main Aur Ekk Tu had a jump and earned around ₹45.0 million (US$480,000) nett, owing to Valentine's Day. At the end of its first week, Ek Main Aur Ekk Tu earned a total of ₹308 million (US$3.3 million). It added ₹75.0 million (US$800,000) and ₹15.0 million (US$160,000) during its second and third week respectively, taking its total to around ₹398 million (US$4.3 million) nett.

Ek Main Aur Ekk Tu had a decent opening at the international box office. In the UK, in its opening weekend, the film collected £242,177 in 53 screens. It fared even better in the United States, collecting $1.7 million from 111 screens in its opening weekend.
