= Imran Khan (film actor) =

Indian-American actor (born 1983)

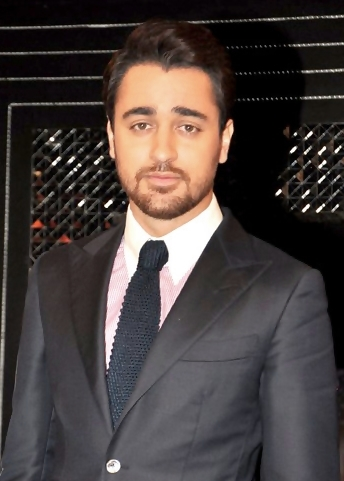
- Khan at an event in 2013
- Born: Imran Pal; 13 January 1983 (age 43); Madison, Wisconsin, U.S.
- Citizenship: American
- Education: New York Film Academy
- Occupation: Actor
- Years active: 2008–2015; 2026–present
- Spouse: Avantika Malik (m. 2011; div. 2019)
- Partner: Lekha Washington (2024–present)
- Children: 1
- Relatives: See Khan–Hussain family

Imran Khan (né Pal) (Hindustani pronunciation: [ɪmˈɾaːn ˈxaːn]; born 13 January 1983) is an American actor and director of Indian origin, known for his work in Hindi-language films. He has received several accolades, including a Filmfare Award, and is known for his work across a range of film genres.

The nephew of actor Aamir Khan and director-producer Mansoor Khan, and the grandson of director-producer Nasir Hussain, Khan appeared as a child artist in the films Qayamat Se Qayamat Tak (1988) and Jo Jeeta Wohi Sikandar (1992). He subsequently pursued filmmaking and method acting at the New York Film Academy. He made his adult acting debut in 2008 with the romantic comedy Jaane Tu... Ya Jaane Na, which was a critical and commercial success. His performance in the film won him the Filmfare Award for Best Male Debut. After the failure of his next two films, Khan was initially written off by the media, calling him a "one-film wonder". He then starred in a number of commercially successful romantic comedies such as I Hate Luv Storys (2010), Mere Brother Ki Dulhan (2011) and Ek Main Aur Ekk Tu (2012), and the action comedy thriller Delhi Belly (2011). This was followed by a series of box-office flops and a hiatus.

Apart from acting in films, Khan is a social activist and has written columns for the Hindustan Times. He is a supporter of PETA, having appeared in events organised for the group. He has since directed the documentary short film Mission Mars: Keep Walking India (2018).

== Early life and background ==
Imran Khan was born on 13 January 1983 in Madison, Wisconsin, United States to Anil Pal, a software engineer, and Nuzhat Khan, a psychologist. Imran's grandfather was a Bengali from Kolkata who married a British woman. Imran's father is an Anglo-Indian of Bengali Hindu descent who studied with Mansoor Khan at IIT Bombay and now works as a senior manager at Yahoo in California. Imran's mother is a Muslim of Pashtun and Arab descent from a film family, daughter of the director-producer Nasir Hussain, sister of director-producer Mansoor Khan and cousin of actor Aamir Khan. Imran Khan is an American citizen by birth and holds an OCI card.

Khan's parents divorced when he was still a toddler, after which his mother moved to Mumbai. In an interview, Khan called his step-father, Raj Zutshi, as the father figure during his growing years. He was enrolled at Bombay Scottish School. According to Khan, he developed a stammer, his grades fell and his academic career went into a "strong decline" due to his inability to cope with his new environment and radically changed family situation; he became nervous and developed facial tics. Meanwhile, his mother married again and found it convenient to send him to a boarding school, choosing Blue Mountain School in distant Coonoor, Tamil Nadu. After a period of depression in Coonoor, Khan adjusted and grew into the environment; he later described his experience there as "phenomenal," although his grades remained poor. When the principal of that school left to start his own school, Khan and several other students followed him to a Gurukul in the jungles of Ooty. The new school had no electricity, the students were required to wash their clothes in a creek and they even grew some of the food they ate. Khan later admitted that frequently changing schools made him independent but also a loner.

Khan then moved to Sunnyvale, California, where he lived with his father and attended Fremont High School. Upon graduation, he aspired to become a film director, and went to Los Angeles to pursue a degree in filmmaking at the Los Angeles branch of the New York Film Academy. Studying direction, writing and cinematography, Khan was inspired by writer Roald Dahl. After receiving his degree, he ventured into market research and advertising. He eventually returned to Mumbai and trained at the Kishore Namit Kapoor Acting Institute.

Khan appeared in the films Qayamat Se Qayamat Tak (1988) and Jo Jeeta Wohi Sikandar (1992) as a child artist, both times playing the role of a young Aamir Khan.

== Acting career ==
=== 2008–10: Debut and breakthrough ===
While training at the acting institute, Khan began networking and met writer-director Abbas Tyrewala, who offered him the lead role in Jaane Tu... Ya Jaane Na (2008). After producer Jhamu Sugandh experienced financial difficulties they offered the script to Aamir Khan, who agreed to finance the film. The romantic comedy received positive reviews and was a commercial success, earning ₹830 million (US$8.6 million) worldwide. Khan's portrayal of Jai Singh Rathore (Rats)—a boy who does not believe in violence—was praised by critics. Khalid Mohammed mentioned that "the enterprise belongs to debutant Imran Khan who comes up with an intelligent and restrained performance." Rajeev Masand of CNN-IBN called him "the best young actor" of the time, describing his performance as "unconventional and vulnerable" and stating that it created "a lasting impression." Khan won the Best Male Debut at the 54th Filmfare Awards, sharing the award with Farhan Akhtar.

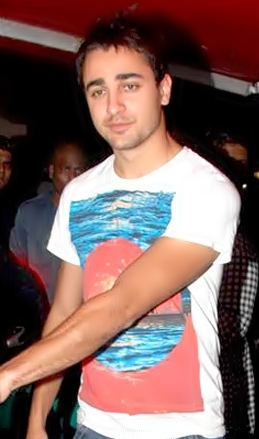
Khan at the screening of I Hate Luv Storys, 2010

Following Jaane Tu... Ya Jaane Na, Khan starred in Sanjay Gadhvi's thriller Kidnap, produced by Ashtavinayak head honcho Dhilin Mehta. He was cast as Kabir Devendra Sharma, a kidnapper who abducts a girl to settle an old score with her father, played by Minissha Lamba and Sanjay Dutt, respectively. The actor was initially hesitant to play the part (calling it "tricky and tough") because he couldn't relate to the character; according to him, he would not have been able to do it without Gadhvi's support and backing. In preparation for his role, Khan listened to metal and rock music for a year to become aggressive. While the film was a critical failure, his performance was generally well received by critics. Gaurav Malani, in a review for The Economic Times, wrote: "Imran Khan is effective as the intelligent abductor who's always two steps ahead of his opponent. However, the natural actor could go easy on his lip movements that appear synthetic at times." Kidnap was also a commercial failure.

Khan next featured alongside an ensemble cast including Dutt, Shruti Haasan, Mithun Chakraborty and Danny Denzongpa in Soham Shah's 2009 action thriller Luck, again produced by Mehta, playing Ram Mehra—an average middle-class man in dire need of money and ready to do anything for it. In an interview he said that the stunts (and the "unusual" concept of human betting) inspired him to sign the film. He burnt his eyelashes while shooting the climax scene. Loosely inspired by the 2001 Italian film Intacto and parts of the 2005 Georgian film 13 Tzameti, it was a commercial failure and generated negative reviews from critics, as did Khan's performance. Rediff.com's Raja Sen stated that the performance lacked the charm of his earlier ones.

After the failure of Kidnap and Luck, Khan received fewer film offers, until Karan Johar approached him for the lead role in I Hate Luv Storys (2010). Written and directed by debutante Punit Malhotra, the romantic comedy saw him portray Jay "J" Dhingra, a young casanova who does not believe in the concept of love and romance. Khan's performance was generally well received. Komal Nahta wrote, "Imran Khan is endearing and does well for a good part of the film. But he does need to improve in emotional scenes. [He] is free and lovable in the light scenes. I Hate Luv Storys was a domestic and international box-office success, earning ₹725.2 million (US$7.5 million). Khan expressed his gratitude that Johar gave him the opportunity. His next appearance was in Danish Aslam's coming-of-age romantic comedy-drama Break Ke Baad. An underwhelming success, the film (and his performance) received mixed reviews; while Namrata Joshi of Outlook labelled his performance "earnest", Anupama Chopra said that "Imran is saddled with a bland, supporting role".

=== 2011–12: Commercial success ===
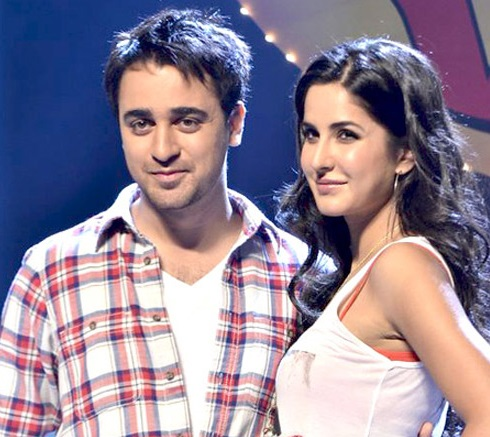
Khan with Katrina Kaif at a promotional event for Mere Brother Ki Dulhan, 2011

In 2011, Khan earned positive reviews for his role in Abhinay Deo's English language action comedy Delhi Belly. He was cast as Tashi, a journalist caught up in a hunt for diamonds—smuggled for a crime boss in Delhi—he and his roommates (Kunaal Roy Kapur and Vir Das) have mistakenly taken. The film opened to critical acclaim and was a commercial success, with a domestic revenue of over ₹550 million (US$5.7 million). A review in Mid-Day described his performance as "refreshingly good" and Nikhat Kazmi of The Times of India called it his best work to date. Khan said "It is the kind of film that I have always wanted to do, and it is very different to what has been done before in Hindi cinema." Later that year, Khan acted in Ali Abbas Zafar's romantic comedy Mere Brother Ki Dulhan. It received mixed-to-positive reviews, and was a box-office success, with domestic earnings of over ₹578 million (US$6.0 million). Khan played Kush Agnihotri, a man who falls in love with his brother's fiancee, played by Ali Zafar and Katrina Kaif, respectively. His performance was praised by critics; Sify's Sonia Chopra referred to him as "instantly likeable".

For his next feature film, Khan starred as Rahul Kapoor, an uptight architect, in Shakun Batra's directorial debut Ek Main Aur Ekk Tu (2012) with Kareena Kapoor. The romantic comedy-drama, set in Las Vegas, is the story of two strangers who get married one night after they get drunk. Khan described his character as "a guy who lives his life according to his parents' wishes." Critical reaction to the film and his performance was positive, with Rajeev Masand writing that "Imran Khan slips comfortably into his role". Karan Anshuman of Mumbai Mirror opined, "Imran Khan is superbly cast and he doesn't let down. His body language slackens in progression as the script demands and he is absolutely spot on with his comic timing." Ek Main Aur Ekk Tu was a modest commercial success, earning a total of ₹530 million (US$5.5 million) in India and abroad.

=== 2013–2015: Setbacks ===
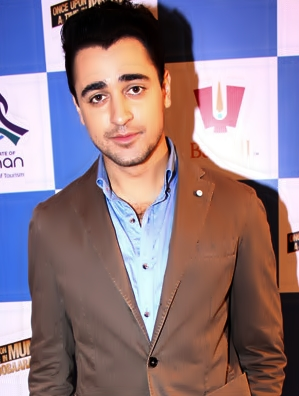
Khan at a promotional event for Once Upon A Time in Mumbai Dobaara!, 2013

In 2013, Khan appeared in three films, the first being Vishal Bhardwaj's Matru Ki Bijlee Ka Mandola, a political satire set in the rustic surroundings of a village in Haryana. Co-starring with Pankaj Kapur, Anushka Sharma and Shabana Azmi, Khan played Hukum Singh Matru, an educated community activist and Kapur's right-hand man. To prepare for the role, he lived in Delhi for three months and learned to speak Haryanvi from theatre group Act One. The film (and his performance) generated mixed reviews from critics, and its eventual box-office profit was poor. Reuters' Shilpa Jamkhandikar wrote, "Imran Khan goes red in the face trying to muster up a Haryanvi accent and act tough. You can actually see the effort in his acting and that's why it jars all the more." Subhash K Jha described it as a good effort, at best. Khan also sang for the film's soundtrack in "Chaar Dina Ki".

Khan's next film role was alongside Akshay Kumar and Sonakshi Sinha in Milan Luthria's period romantic-drama Once Upon A Time in Mumbai Dobaara! (a sequel to 2010's Once Upon a Time in Mumbaai). Critical reaction to the film and Khan's portrayal of a gangster was mixed. While Shubhra Gupta of The Indian Express found him unconvincing, NDTV's Saibal Chatterjee wrote, "He provides evidence that he can handle a wider range of roles than he is usually allowed to play." Also that year, he starred opposite Kareena Kapoor in Punit Malhotra's romantic comedy Gori Tere Pyaar Mein, a critical and commercial failure. He also appeared in a satirical comedy YouTube video "Imran Khan Answers Questions About Being Gay & Sec 377" for AIB, to extend his support for the LGBTQ community.

In 2015, Khan acted in Nikhil Advani's romantic drama Katti Batti, opposite Kangana Ranaut. The film opened to mixed reviews and was another box-office failure for him; it has been his last release featuring him in a lead role to date. He later made his directorial debut with the documentary short film Mission Mars: Keep Walking India (2018).

== Other works ==
In 2009, he participated in Eve Ensler's play The Vagina Monologues in celebration of completing 200 shows in India and V-Day. The event was a fundraiser whose beneficiaries included Haseena Hussein (a girl who was blinded and disfigured in an acid attack in Bangalore in 1999), and several other NGOs. Khan endorses People for the Ethical Treatment of Animals (PETA), and has appeared in a number of advertisements in support of the organisation. In 2010 he appeared with his dog, Tony, urging viewers to adopt stray dogs instead of buying purebred animals. Khan filmed a second advertisement in 2011, titled "Tony Changed My Life. You Can Change a Homeless Dog's Life. Please Adopt", after Tony's death in which he continued to advocate for the adoption of animals and not treating them as fashion statements.

In 2011, Khan and his brother-in-law, Vedant Malik, opposed the Maharashtra state government's new law raising the drinking age to 25 by filing a public-interest litigation (PIL) against it. In an interview given to The Times of India he said; "It's completely unfair to expect that one has to wait till 25 years to exercise his freedom of choice regarding one's lifestyle. Young India is not as irresponsible as the older establishment assumes it to be." He walked the ramp to support Shabana Azmi's charitable initiative, Mijwan Welfare Society, an NGO dedicated to empowering girls. He said that he feels privileged to have been brought up in a family surrounded by strong women. In 2013, Khan along with his wife Avantika Malik and mother Nuzhat Khan, purchased a four-acre land which will be converted into an animal shelter with veterinary doctors and staff who will attend to the rescued animals until they are adopted.

In 2014, it was announced that he had joined other Bollywood and international celebrities in the TeachAids initiative, a state-of-the-art approach to worldwide HIV prevention, developed at Stanford University.

Khan became a columnist for the Hindustan Times in March 2009, and continues contributing occasionally to the paper. Khan has refused to promote alcohol and tobacco products, condemning such products instead, by saying that he only represents brands he can relate to. He has endorsed several products (including Coca-Cola, Levis, MTS India, Maaza, Bru and Lux), having appeared in television and print advertisements.

== Personal life ==
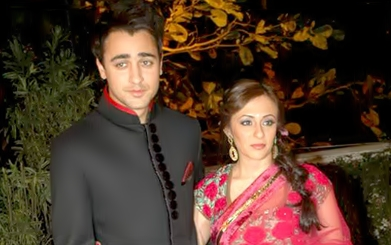
Khan and Avantika Malik at their wedding reception, February 2011

Khan's parents divorced when he was a year and a half old. His mother then married actor Raj Zutshi; they divorced in 2006. Khan says that they remained cordial and that he felt supported by all three of his parents. He retained his mother's maiden name as a tribute to her because she raised him on her own. The actor lives with his family in Pali Hill, a suburban neighbourhood in Mumbai.

Khan began dating Avantika Malik (daughter of Vandana Malik and niece of Raghav Bahl, the founder of the Network18 Group), at age 19. He later attributed his personal growth to his relationship with Malik: "I have learned a lot about myself and become a more balanced person." His openness about their relationship at an early stage of his career received much press coverage; Sitanshi Talati-Parikh of Verve commented, "he does not see any danger in tagging himself as 'unavailable'". Khan later explained that he did not believe in hiding their relationship; he cited Aamir Khan, Shahrukh Khan and Hrithik Roshan, all of whom married early in their careers and remained popular. The couple was engaged on 16 January 2010, in a farmhouse owned by Avantika's family in Karjat (near Navi Mumbai). They married a year later (on 10 January 2011) in a private civil ceremony at Aamir Khan's home in Pali Hill. On 6 December 2013, it was announced that the couple were expecting their first child and on 9 June 2014, Malik gave birth to a baby girl, Imara Malik Khan. In May 2019, the couple started living separately, and Avantika left Khan's home with their daughter. The couple decided to separate due to irreconcilable differences after an eight-year-long marriage.

In a video on the comedian Raunaq Rajani's YouTube channel, Khan said that he started seeing someone during COVID and they were "in the process" of moving in together. In 2024, Khan publicly confirmed his relationship with actress Lekha Washington in interviews where both stated that they were "mutually, madly in love".

Khan's non-controversial lifestyle has generated speculation in the mass media. During an interview, he said he does not rely on controversy and rumours to stay in the news. The actor also asserted that he prefers to stay away from the limelight when not promoting his films.

Khan was detained by Mumbai Police on 10 October 2026 while participating in the 2026 Mumbai Shivaji Park protests at August Kranti Maidan called by Tushar Gandhi against alleged irregularities in electoral roll revisions and demanding the resignation of Chief Election Commissioner Gyanesh Kumar. Khan, his partner Lekha Washington and his cousin Zayn Marie Khan were detained by Mumbai Police, who said that the venue was not a designated protest site under a Bombay High Court order. Khan said that he attended as a Mumbai resident and not in association with any political group. Mumbai Police issued a notice on 15 October asking him to leave India by 28 October. Reports said the action was under immigration law because he is a foreign national.

== In the media ==
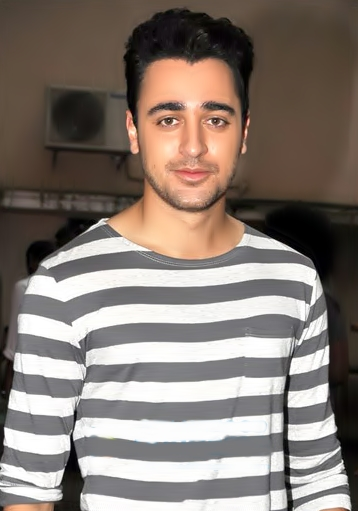
Khan at an endorsement photoshoot, 2013

In 2011, Bombay Dost, India's first legal gay magazine, labelled him a "gay icon". The following year he was featured on GQ India's list of "Bollywood's 11 Best-Dressed Actors", which described his style sense: "grown and matured into an irresistible combination of goody-two-shoesness and an urbane sophistication."

In 2013, he ranked fortieth on Forbes' "Celebrity 100", a list based on the income and popularity of India's biggest entertainers.

After moving from his "lover boy" image in Delhi Belly and Matru Ki Bijlee Ka Mandola, Khan was noted for experimenting with different genres and character types. The Hindu's Vijay Nair labelled him as "unconvincing" and said that he "[delivers] performances that suffer in comparison to what his co stars bring to the film." Khan has been compared to his uncle Aamir Khan, whom he describes as a major influence on his life.

In October 2026, Khan was detained by Mumbai Police while protesting. Khan, being a citizen of the United States and OCI holder, later appealed against the Leave India Notice issued by the Foreigners Regional Registration Office. This notice asked Khan to leave India. On 2 November, the Bombay High Court ordered Khan to give an unconditional apology and a letter that he will never join such a protest again. Khan complied with this and continued keeping the notice in abeyance awaiting for FRRO's decision.

== Filmography ==
Year	Film	Role	Notes
1988	Qayamat Se Qayamat Tak	Young Raj	Child artist
1992	Jo Jeeta Wohi Sikandar	Young Sanjaylal	Child artist
2008	Jaane Tu... Ya Jaane Na	Jai "Rats" Singh Rathore	
2008	Kidnap	Kabir Devendra Sharma	
2009	Luck	Ram Mehra	
2010	I Hate Luv Storys	Jay Dhingra	
2010	Jhootha Hi Sahi	Akash Dixit/Akshay	Voice-over
2010	Break Ke Baad	Abhay Gulati	
2011	Delhi Belly	Tashi Dorjee Lhatoo	English-language film
2011	Mere Brother Ki Dulhan	Kush Agnihotri	
2012	Ek Main Aur Ekk Tu	Rahul Kapoor	
2013	Matru Ki Bijlee Ka Mandola	Hukum Singh Matru	Also playback singer for song "Chaar Dina Ki"
2013	Bombay Talkies	Himself	Special appearance in song "Apna Bombay Talkies"
2013	Once Upon ay Time in Mumbai Dobaara!	Aslam Siddiqui	
2013	Gori Tere Pyaar Mein	Sriram Venkat	
2015	Katti Batti	Madhav "Maddy" Kabra	
2026	Happy Patel: Khatarnak Jasoos	Milind Morea	Special appearance

== Accolades ==
Year	Award	Category	Nominated work	Result	Ref.
2009	Filmfare Awards	Best Male Debut	Jaane Tu... Ya Jaane Na	Won	
2009	Apsara Film & Television Producers Guild Awards	Best Male Debut	Jaane Tu... Ya Jaane Na	Won	
2009	Screen Awards	Most Promising Newcomer – Male	Jaane Tu... Ya Jaane Na	Nominated	
2009	Stardust Awards	Superstar of Tomorrow – Male	Jaane Tu... Ya Jaane Na	Nominated	
2009	Stardust Awards	The New Menace	Kidnap	Nominated	
2009	International Indian Film Academy Awards	Best Villain	Kidnap	Nominated	
2009	Apsara Film & Television Producers Guild Awards	Best Actor in a Negative Role	Kidnap	Nominated	
2009	AXN Action Awards	Best Actor in a Negative Role	Kidnap	Won	
2010	Stardust Awards	Superstar of Tomorrow – Male	Luck	Nominated	
2011	Screen Awards	Best Actor (Popular Choice)	I Hate Luv Storys	Nominated	
2011	Stardust Awards	Best Actor – Comedy/Romance	I Hate Luv Storys	Nominated	
2011	GQ Men of the Year Awards	Chivas Award for Outstanding Achievement		Won	
2012	Zee Cine Awards	International Male Icon		Nominated	
2012	Screen Awards	Best Actor (Popular Choice)	Delhi Belly & Mere Brother Ki Dulhan	Nominated	
2012	Screen Awards	Best Ensemble Cast	Delhi Belly	Nominated	
2012	People's Choice Awards India	Favorite Youth Icon		Nominated	
2013	Screen Awards	Best Actor (Popular Choice)	Ek Main Aur Ekk Tu	Nominated	
2013	Stardust Awards	Best Actor – Comedy/Romance	Ek Main Aur Ekk Tu	Nominated	

== See also ==
- List of Indian film actors
