= Paakhi Tyrewala =

Indian actress

Pakhi Tyrewala
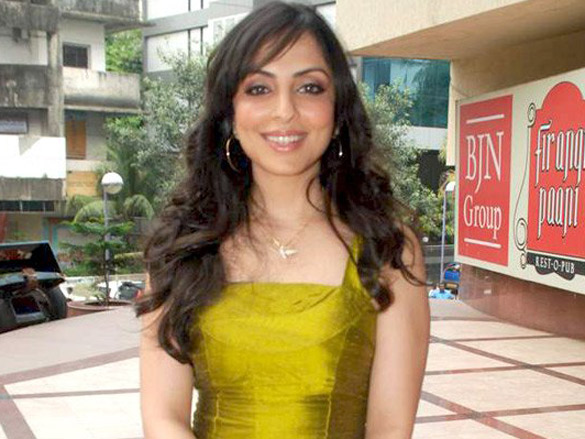
- Tyrewala in May 2017
- Born: Punarnava Mehta; Chhindwara, India
- Occupations: Director, Writer, Actor
- Years active: 1995–present
- Known for: Pahuna, Kajal, Jhootha Hi Sahi
- Spouse: Abbas Tyrewala

Pakhi Tyrewala is an Indian writer and director known for her impactful storytelling in independent cinema. She gained recognition for directing Pahuna: The Little Visitors (2017), a critically acclaimed children’s film produced by Priyanka Chopra, and Kajal (2019), a short film exploring gender dynamics. In 2026, she co-founded Curious Cat Cottage - a Boutique stay in Naggar, Himachal Pradesh with Kanishk Godha.

== Early life and education ==
Paakhi was born and brought up in Delhi to a linguistics lecturer and a journalist. She completed her schooling from Sardar Patel Vidyalaya, New Delhi.

== Personal life ==
Paakhi is married to director Abbas Tyrewala. They fell in love during the shooting of Jaane Tu Ya Jaane Na in which she was the casting director. She is also an Art of Living Teacher and has worked extensively in the North-East, India as part of numerous humanitarian projects. She has been associated with the Art of Living foundation since 20 years and has helped empower the youth to achieve their full potential by teaching them how to live a stress free life.

== Career ==
Paakhi A Tyrewala started off her career as a child artist in movies, serials, and theater in 1996. Her first ever performance was when she was two and a half years old. She made her debut as a child artist in 1997, in the film Dance of the Wind. Deep in her heart, she always knew she belonged to cinema. She came to Mumbai in the year 2000 where she started modelling for the brands such as Ponds, Sunsilk, Dabur Vattika, Hero Honda, Ray-Ban and Organics etc. She starred in the film Yeh Kya Ho Raha Hai in 2002, in which she played a Russian girl Stella.

Since then, she has worked extensively behind the camera as well as in front of it, exploring various departments in the industry along her journey. She worked on a couple of films as a writer, actor and casting director. In 2010 she was cast opposite John Abraham in the film Jhoota Hi Sahi, which was directed by her husband Abbas Tyrewala.The film received a decent review from the audience, but did not do as expected at the box office. In 2010, she went to TICSH, New York to study film making. In December 2011, Paakhi started working as an assistant director with Nagesh Kukunoor for his film, The Boxer, and then his documentary, Lakshmi, in 2012.

Her stints as an actor, writer and casting director finally poised her to take flight towards her first love - direction. She helmed her first short film Kajal in 2017 and her first feature film Pahuna, produced by Priyanka Chopra's Purple Pebble Pictures is ready for release in December' 2018.

=== Director ===
Her first shot at direction was a song she directed in Jaane Tu Ya Jaane Na. With Kajal, she started her journey as a film-maker. This short film Kajal received rave reviews from the critics and audience alike, premiering at the New York Indian Film Festival 2017 and picking the award for Best Film and Best Music at Feedback Female Film Festival 2017, Toronto and Best Actress award at Bangalore Shorts Film Festival.

Paakhi moved to her first full-length feature film right after, choosing the much ignored and less covered North East region of India to base her story and shoot in. This was a script she wrote 10 years ago and decided to pick up again for her first story. Pahuna is the journey of three kids from Nepal who get separated from their parents and find a home for themselves in the beautiful Indian state of Sikkim. The film has been made in Nepali, a language unknown to Paakhi; proving her to be a fearless filmmaker. Her intentions found a partner in Priyanka Chopra, who decided to produce this unique story under her banner Purple Pebble Pictures.

Recently, she has been in the news for the successful premier of Pahuna at Toronto International Film Festival (TIFF) 2017, where it was received with a standing ovation. The film also won the Best Film (Jury Choice) in The International Children's Film Festival in Germany and won the Best Film Award by the European Jury and a special mention in International Category at Schlingel Film Festival. The film is slated for a commercial release on 7 December 2018 in India.

=== Writer ===
Paakhi has four films credited to her as a writer including De Taali, Jhootha Hi Sahi, her first short film Kajal & full feature-film Pahuna.

=== Actor ===
She has worked in two films as the main lead - Yeh Kya Ho Raha Hai (2002) and Jhoota Hi Sahi (2010).

== Filmography ==
=== As writer ===
- De Taali (2008)
- Jhoota Hi Sahi (2010)
- Kajal (2017)
- Pahuna: The Little Visitors (2017)

=== As actor ===
- Dance of the Wind (1997) as Shabda
- Yeh Kya Ho Raha Hai? (2002) as Stella
- Jhootha Hi Sahi (2010) as Mishka

=== As Casting Director ===
- Jaane Tu... Ya Jaane Na (2008)

=== As Assistant Director ===
- The Boxer (2011)
- Lakshmi (2012)

=== As director ===
- Kajal (2017)
- Pahuna (2017)

=== Awards ===
- Best Film - Pahuna (Schlingel Film Festival 2018 - Germany)
- Special Mention - Pahuna (Schlingel International Film Festival 2018 - Germany)
- Best Film - Kajal (Feedback Female Film Festival 2017 - Toronto)
- Best Music - Kajal (Feedback Female Film Festival 2017 - Toronto)
- Best Actress - Kajal (Bangalore Shorts Film Festival 2017 - India)
- Audience Award Best Short Film - Kajal (River to River Florence Indian Film Festival 2017 - Italy)
- Best Film - Kajal (Jaipur International Film Festival 2017 - India)
