= 1st Mirchi Music Awards =

Indian film music awards in 2009

- Sponsored by: Tata Indicom
- Date: March 28, 2009
- Location: Hotel Taj Lands End, Bandra, Mumbai
- Country: India
- Presented by: Radio Mirchi
- Hosted by: Shaan and Tulip Joshi

Highlights
- Most awards: Jodhaa Akbar (7)
- Song of the Year: "Jashn-e-Bahara" - Jodhaa Akbar
- Album of the Year: Jaane Tu... Ya Jaane Na
- Website: Music Mirchi Awards 2008

Television/radio coverage
- Network: StarPlus

The 1st Mirchi Music Awards, presented by the Radio Mirchi, honoured the best of Hindi music from the year 2008. The ceremony was held on 28 March 2009 at the Hotel Taj Lands End, Bandra, Mumbai and was hosted by Shaan and Tulip Joshi. There were many performances, including those by Dominique Cerejo, Benny Dayal, Manohari Singh, Bipasha Basu, Shreya Ghoshal, Genelia D'Souza, Kunal Ganjawala, Shahid Kapoor and Prachi Shah, the winner of the Tata Indicom Talent Hunt. Awards were given out in 17 different categories. Jodhaa Akbar won a leading seven awards including Song of the Year. Album of the Year was won by film Jaane Tu... Ya Jaane Na. The show was broadcast on 12 April 2009 on StarPlus.

== Winners and nominees ==
The winners were selected by the members of jury, chaired by Javed Akhtar. The following are the names of winners.

=== Film awards ===
Category	Recipient	Song	Film
Song of the Year	-	"Jashn-e-Bahara"	Jodhaa Akbar
Album of the Year	A.R Rahman, Abbas Tyrewala	-	Jaane Tu... Ya Jaane Na
Male Vocalist of the Year	Javed Ali	"Jashn-e-Bahara"	Jodhaa Akbar
Female Vocalist of the Year	Bela Shende	"Manmohana"	Jodhaa Akbar
Music Composer of the Year	A.R Rahman	-	Jaane Tu... Ya Jaane Na
Lyricist of the Year	Javed Akhtar	"Jashn-e-Bahara"	Jodhaa Akbar
Upcoming Male Vocalist of the Year	Benny Dayal	"Kaise Mujhe"	Ghajini
Upcoming Female Vocalist of the Year	Dominique Cerejo	"Ye Tumhari"	Rock On!!
Upcoming Music Composer of The Year	Dhruv Ghanekar	-	Drona
Upcoming Lyricist of The Year	Ashok Mishra	-	Welcome to Sajjanpur

=== Technical awards ===
Category	Recipient	Song	Film
Best Song Arranger & Programmer	TR Krishna Chetan	"Jashn-e-Bahara"	Jodhaa Akbar
Best Song Mixing & Engineering	H. Sridhar	"Jashn-e-Bahara"	Jodhaa Akbar
Best Background Score	A.R Rahman	-	Jodhaa Akbar

=== Special awards ===
Jury Award for Outstanding Contribution to Hindi Film Music	Manohari Singh
Lifetime Achievement Award	Lata Mangeshkar

=== Listeners' Choice awards ===
Listeners' Choice Song of the Year	"Kabhi Kabhi Aditi" - Jaane Tu... Ya Jaane Na
Listeners' Choice Album of the Year	Jaane Tu... Ya Jaane Na

=== Films with multiple wins ===
Films that received multiple awards
Wins	Film
7	Jodhaa Akbar
4	Jaane Tu... Ya Jaane Na

== Jury ==
The jury was chaired by Javed Akhtar. Other members were:

- Anu Malik - music director
- Lalit Pandit - composer
- Kailash Kher - singer
- Kavita Krishnamurthy - playback singer
- Kunal Kohli - director
- Louis Banks - composer, record producer and singer
- Prasoon Joshi - lyricist and screenwriter
- Rakeysh Omprakash Mehra - filmmaker and screenwriter
- Ramesh Sippy - director and producer
- Sadhana Sargam - playback singer
- Shankar Mahadevan - composer and playback singer
- Sonu Nigam - playback singer
- Suresh Wadkar - playback singer

== See also ==
- Mirchi Music Awards
