= Abbas Tyrewala =

Indian screenwriter and director

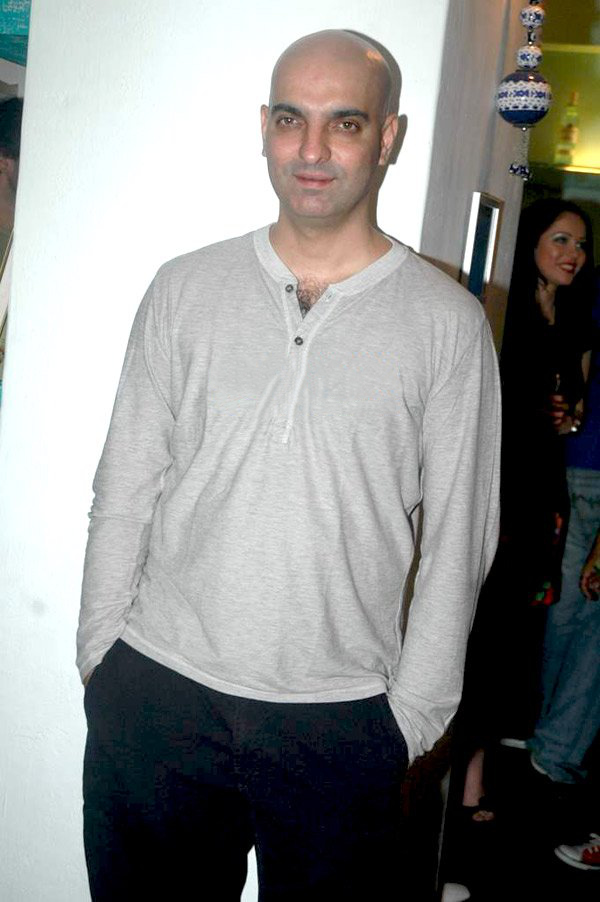
- Tyrewala at the Yellow Tree Cafe anniversary bash
- Born: 15 May 1974 (age 52); Mumbai, Maharashtra, India
- Occupations: Screenwriter; lyricist; film director
- Years active: 2001–present
- Spouse: Paakhi Tyrewala

Abbas Tyrewala (born 15 May 1974) is an Indian screenwriter, lyricist and film director. He worked as a screenwriter and dialogue writer in the early 2000s, contributing to films such as Maqbool (2003) and Munna Bhai M.B.B.S. (2003). He made his directorial debut with the romantic comedy film Jaane Tu... Ya Jaane Na in 2008.

== Early life ==
Tyrewala was born in Mumbai, Maharashtra, on 15 May 1974. He began writing songs and plays while studying at St. Xavier's College, Mumbai. In 1993, he wrote an advertising jingle for a commercial, which was his first paid writing assignment.

== Career ==
Tyrewala began working as a lyricist with the 2000 film Dil Pe Mat Le Yaar!! and the 2001 film Love Ke Liye Kuch Bhi Karega. He subsequently wrote dialogues for films, beginning with Asoka (2001). In 2008, he made his directorial debut with the comedy film Jaane Tu... Ya Jaane Na, starring Imran Khan. His second directorial film was Jhootha Hi Sahi (2010), starring John Abraham.

== Filmography ==
Year	Film	Director	Screenwriter	Lyrics	Notes
2000	Dil Pe Mat Le Yaar!!	No	No	Yes	
2001	Love Ke Liye Kuch Bhi Karega	No	No	Yes	
2001	Kushi	No	No	Yes	Telugu film
2001	Asoka	No	Dialogues	No	
2002	Karz: The Burden of Truth	No	No	Yes	
2002	Leela	No	No	Yes	
2003	Paanch	No	No	Yes	
2003	Chupke Se	No	Yes	No	
2003	Darna Mana Hai	No	Yes	No	
2003	Maqbool	No	Yes	No	Also actor
2003	Munna Bhai M.B.B.S.	No	Dialogues	No	
2004	Main Hoon Na	No	Yes	No	
2005	Vaada	No	Dialogues	No	
2005	Shikhar	No	Yes	No	
2005	Salaam Namaste	No	Dialogues	No	
2008	De Taali	No	Yes	No	
2008	Jaane Tu... Ya Jaane Na	Yes	Yes	No	
2009	Blue	No	No	Yes	
2010	Jhootha Hi Sahi	Yes	Yes	Yes	
2014	Bang Bang!	No	Dialogues	No	
2018	2.0	No	Dialogues	Yes	Dubbed version
2019	War	No	Dialogues	No	
2023	Pathaan	No	Dialogues	No	
2024	Vijay 69	No	Additional dialogues	No	
2025	War 2	No	Dialogues	No	
2026	King †	No	Dialogues	No	

== Awards and nominations ==
- 2004: Filmfare Best Dialogue Award for Munna Bhai M.B.B.S.
- 2004: Zee Cine Award for Best Dialogue for Munna Bhai M.B.B.S.
- 2005: GIFA Best Screenplay Award for Maqbool
- 2005: Zee Cine Award for Best Screenplay for Maqbool (shared with Vishal Bhardwaj)
