= List of accolades received by Ra.One =

List of awards won by Ra.One
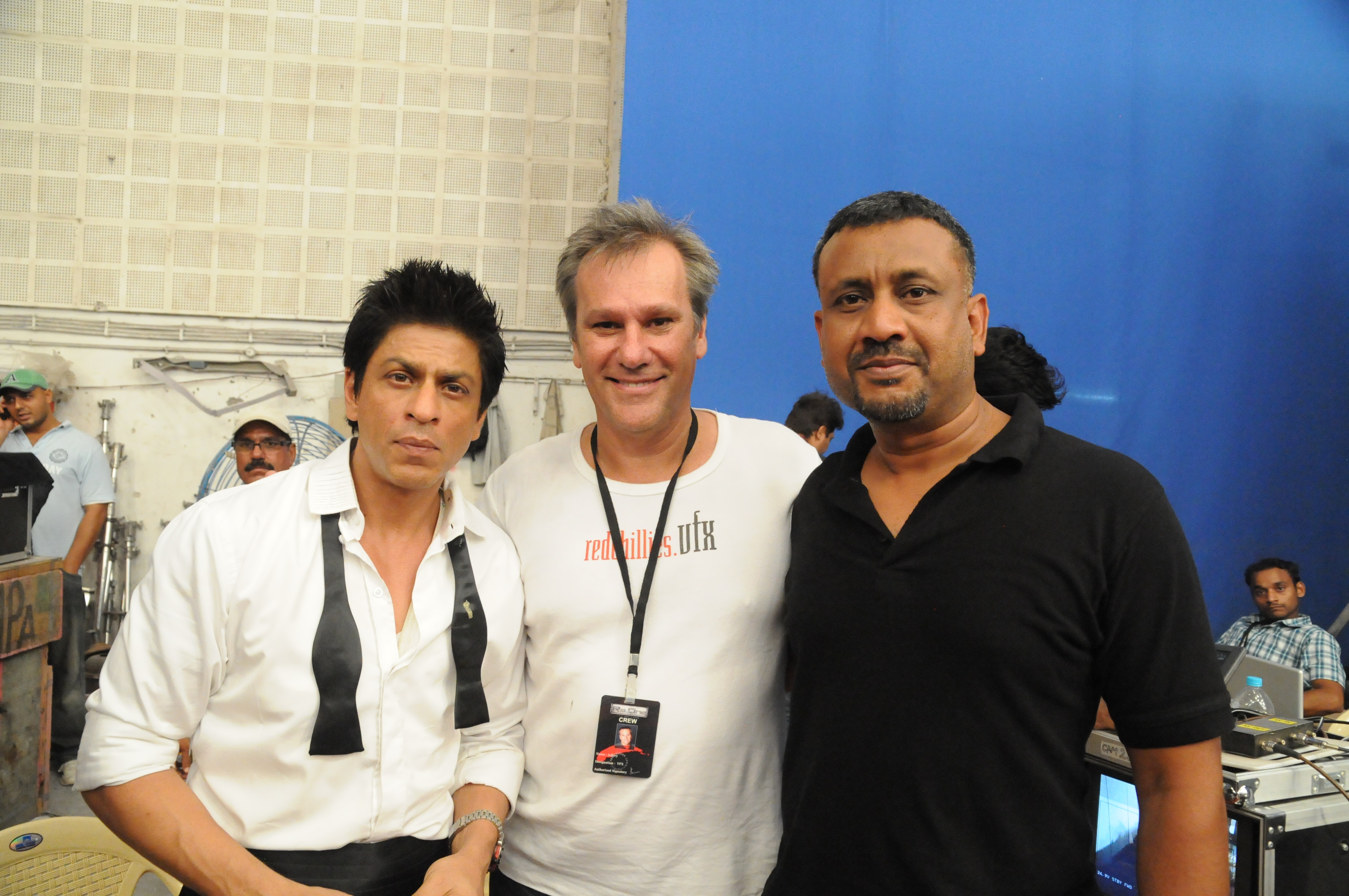
- The film's visual effects, co-ordinated by Jeffrey Kleiser (centre), received numerous awards at major award ceremonies, in addition to receiving critical, industry and audience acclaim.
Awards and nominations
Award	Won	Nominated
BIG Star Entertainment Awards	0	3
ETC Business Awards	5	5
Lions Gold Awards	3	3
Star Screen Awards	3	8
Zee Cine Awards	6	8
Filmfare Awards	1	5
Stardust Awards	0	4
National Film Awards	1	1
Apsara Film & Television Producers Guild Awards	5	9
FICCI Best Animation Frames Awards	2	2
Asian Film Awards	0	1
Mirchi Music Awards	2	5
IIFA Awards	4	5
Ghanta Awards	1	5
Golden Kela Awards	2	4
- Tally
Totals	36	70

Ra.One is a 2011 Indian superhero film co-written and directed by Anubhav Sinha, and starring Arjun Rampal in the title role with Shahrukh Khan, Kareena Kapoor, Shahana Goswami and Armaan Verma in the lead roles. The film was co-produced by Red Chillies Entertainment and Eros International, and involved a large, multi-national crew for the production. Ra.One was one of the most expensive Indian productions, and the most expensive Bollywood film at that time with an official budget of ₹135 crore (US$16 million).

Commercially, the film set records for single-day net revenue and highest three-day opening weekend, though it suffered large drops at the box office in subsequent weeks. Ra.One became the third-highest-grossing Bollywood film of 2011. It is estimated that the film earned ₹240 crore (US$28 million) worldwide if the dubbed versions are included.

Upon release, Ra.One met a mixed critical reception in India, though the overseas reception was more positive. Despite the mixed reception and reports of failing audience expectations, the film's visual effects and other technical aspects received unanimous praise from the audiences and a number of industry members, including prominent actors and directors. Mirroring this trend, Ra.One received a number of awards and nominations at high-profile ceremonies including the National Film Awards, Filmfare Awards and International Indian Film Academy Awards, the majority of them being for technical aspects like action, production design and sound design. The visual effects, executed by Red Chillies VFX under the supervision of Jeffrey Kleiser, won the award for Best Special Effects at nine award ceremonies.

Another heavily awarded feature of Ra.One was its business aspect, which won a number of awards at the ETC Bollywood Business Awards and the Zee Cine Awards for the marketing and box office records. The film also received numerous nominations for its soundtrack, with a special emphasis on the song "Chammak Challo" and its choreography. The film received further nominations at the Star Screen Awards and Stardust Awards, primarily for the acting and entertainment categories which were voted upon by popular choice. Despite this, it was reported that winning the National Film Award had given a major boost to the enthusiasm for a sequel to Ra.One.

== Awards and nominations ==
Note – The lists are ordered by the date of announcement, not by the date of ceremony/telecast.

Award distributor	Date	Award category	Nomination recipient	Nomination result	Reference
BIG Star Entertainment Awards	19 December 2011	Most Entertaining Actor – Male	Shahrukh Khan	Nominated	
BIG Star Entertainment Awards	19 December 2011	Most Entertaining Song	"Chammak Challo"	Nominated	
BIG Star Entertainment Awards	19 December 2011	Most Entertaining Singer – Female	Hamsika Iyer – "Chammak Challo"	Nominated	
ETC Bollywood Business Awards	9 January 2012	Most Profitable Actor – Overseas	Shahrukh Khan (along with Don 2)	Won	
ETC Bollywood Business Awards	9 January 2012	Most Profitable Actor – Female	Kareena Kapoor (along with Bodyguard)	Won	
ETC Bollywood Business Awards	9 January 2012	Best Marketed Movie of the Year		Won	
ETC Bollywood Business Awards	9 January 2012	Highest Single-Day Collections		Won	
ETC Bollywood Business Awards	9 January 2012	Excellence in International Distribution	Eros International (with other films)	Won	
Lions Gold Awards	11 January 2012	Favorite Actor in a Leading Role – Male	Shahrukh Khan	Won	
Lions Gold Awards	11 January 2012	Favorite Choreographer – Critics	Ganesh Hegde – "Chammak Challo"	Won	
Lions Gold Awards	11 January 2012	Favorite Special Effects	Naresh Malhotra	Won	
Star Screen Awards	14 January 2012	Best Actor – Popular Choice	Shahrukh Khan (also for Don 2)	Won	
Star Screen Awards	14 January 2012	Best Special Effects	Keitan Yadav, Harry Hingorani	Won	
Star Screen Awards	14 January 2012	Best Action	Spiro R., N.D. Gill, Parvez, Feroze	Won	
Star Screen Awards	14 January 2012	Best Child Artist	Armaan Verma	Nominated	
Star Screen Awards	14 January 2012	Best Background Music	Vishal–Shekhar	Nominated	
Star Screen Awards	14 January 2012	Best Sound Design	Resul Pookutty	Nominated	
Star Screen Awards	14 January 2012	Best Choreography	Ganesh Hegde – "Chammak Challo"	Nominated	
Star Screen Awards	14 January 2012	Best Costumes	Anaita Shroff Adajania, Manish Malhotra	Nominated	
Zee Cine Awards	21 January 2012	Best Film	Anubhav Sinha	Nominated	
Zee Cine Awards	21 January 2012	Best Actor Popular (Male)	Shahrukh Khan	Nominated	
Zee Cine Awards	21 January 2012	Song of The Year	"Chammak Challo"	Won	
Zee Cine Awards	21 January 2012	Best Sound Design	Resul Pookutty	Won	
Zee Cine Awards	21 January 2012	Best Action	Spiro R., N.D. Gill, Parvez, Feroze	Won	
Zee Cine Awards	21 January 2012	Best Visual Effects		Won	
Zee Cine Awards	21 January 2012	Best Marketed Film		Won	
Zee Cine Awards	21 January 2012	Best Use of New Media		Won	
Filmfare Awards	January 29, 2012	Best Music Director	Vishal–Shekhar	Nominated	
Filmfare Awards	January 29, 2012	Best Lyricist	Vishal Dadlani, Niranjan Iyengar – "Chammak Challo"	Nominated	
Filmfare Awards	January 29, 2012	Best Playback Singer (Male)	Akon, Vishal Dadlani – "Chammak Challo"	Nominated	
Filmfare Awards	January 29, 2012	Best Playback Singer (Male)	Shafqat Amanat Ali – "Dildaara"	Nominated	
Filmfare Awards	January 29, 2012	Best Special Effects	Red Chillies VFX	Won	
Stardust Awards	10 February 2012	Film of the Year		Nominated	
Stardust Awards	10 February 2012	Best Actress in a Thriller/Action Film	Kareena Kapoor	Nominated	
Stardust Awards	10 February 2012	Star of the Year – Male	Shahrukh Khan (also for Don 2)	Nominated	
Stardust Awards	10 February 2012	Star of the Year – Female	Kareena Kapoor (also for Bodyguard)	Nominated	
National Film Awards	March 7, 2012	Best Special Effects	Harry Hingorani, Keitan Yadav	Won	
Apsara Film & Television Producers Guild Awards	11 March 2012	Entertainer of the Year	Shahrukh Khan (also for Don 2)	Won	
Apsara Film & Television Producers Guild Awards	11 March 2012	Best Choreography	Ganesh Hegde – "Chammak Challo"	Nominated	
Apsara Film & Television Producers Guild Awards	11 March 2012	Best Singer (Male)	Akon, Vishal Dadlani – "Chammak Challo"	Nominated	
Apsara Film & Television Producers Guild Awards	11 March 2012	Best Editing	Sanjay Sharma	Nominated	
Apsara Film & Television Producers Guild Awards	11 March 2012	Best Art Direction	Sabu Cyril	Nominated	
Apsara Film & Television Producers Guild Awards	11 March 2012	Best Sound Design	Resul Pookutty, Amrit Pritam Dutta	Won	
Apsara Film & Television Producers Guild Awards	11 March 2012	Best Special Effects	Red Chillies VFX	Won	
Apsara Film & Television Producers Guild Awards	11 March 2012	Best Sound Mixing	Anup Dev, Tarun Bhandari	Won	
FICCI Best Animation Frame Awards	15 March 2012	VFX in a Motion Picture	Red Chillies VFX	Won	
FICCI Best Animation Frame Awards	15 March 2012	VFX Shot of the Year (Jury)	Red Chillies VFX	Won	
Asian Film Awards	March 19, 2012	Best Special Effects	Ritesh Aggarwal	Nominated	
Mirchi Music Awards	March 21, 2012	Best Programmer and Arranger	Abhijeet Nalani, Giorgio Tuinfort – "Chammak Challo"	Won	
Mirchi Music Awards	March 21, 2012	Best Song Recording	Vijay Dayal, Mark Goodchild – "Chammak Challo"	Won	
Mirchi Music Awards	March 21, 2012	Song of The Year	"Chammak Challo"	Nominated	
Mirchi Music Awards	March 21, 2012	Album of The Year	Vishal–Shekhar, Atahar Panchi, Vishal Dadlani, Kumaar	Nominated	
Mirchi Music Awards	March 21, 2012	Best Item Song of the Year	"Chammak Challo"	Nominated	
International Indian Film Academy Awards	May 4, 2012 (technical); June 9, 2012 (general)	Best Music Director	Vishal–Shekhar	Nominated	
International Indian Film Academy Awards	May 4, 2012 (technical); June 9, 2012 (general)	Best Special Effects	Red Chillies VFX	Won	
International Indian Film Academy Awards	May 4, 2012 (technical); June 9, 2012 (general)	Best Production Design	Sabu Cyril	Won	
International Indian Film Academy Awards	May 4, 2012 (technical); June 9, 2012 (general)	Best Song Recording	Vishal–Shekhar – "Chammak Challo"	Won	
International Indian Film Academy Awards	May 4, 2012 (technical); June 9, 2012 (general)	Best Sound Recording	Resul Pookutty, Amrit Pritam Dutta – "Chammak Challo"	Won	
Ghanta Awards	17 March 2012	Worst Film		Won	
Ghanta Awards	17 March 2012	Worst Director	Anubhav Sinha	Nominated	
Ghanta Awards	17 March 2012	Worst Actor	Shahrukh Khan (also for Don 2)	Nominated	
Ghanta Awards	17 March 2012	Worst Song	"Chammak Challo"	Nominated	
Ghanta Awards	17 March 2012	WTF Was That?	"The unexplained science behind the science fiction part of Ra.One"	Nominated	
Golden Kela Awards	1 April 2012	Worst Film		Won	
Golden Kela Awards	1 April 2012	Worst Director	Anubhav Sinha	Won	
Golden Kela Awards	1 April 2012	Worst Supporting Actor	Tom Wu	Nominated	
Golden Kela Awards	1 April 2012	Most Irritating Song	"Chammak Challo"	Nominated	
