= List of awards and nominations received by Vishal–Shekhar =

Vishal–Shekhar are a music directing duo of Vishal Dadlani and Shekhar Ravjiani who have worked in Hindi, Telugu and Marathi films. Their works include Jhankaar Beats, Dus, Bluffmaster, Om Shanti Om, Bachna Ae Haseeno, Dostana, Chintakayala Ravi, Anjaana Anjaani, Ra.One, Student of the Year, Chennai Express, Bang Bang! and Happy New Year.

The duo rose to prominence when they composed the score for the film Jhankaar Beats which included the song "Tu Aashiqui Hai". They won the Filmfare RD Burman Award for New Music Talent for Jhankaar Beats. The music for the film Musafir combined techno music with Indian sounds. The score included "Saaki" and "Door Se Paas". In 2005 they composed the scores for three films: Salaam Namaste, Dus and Bluffmaster. Vishal Dadlani is also the vocalist of Mumbai-based electronic band Pentagram. He collaborated with Imogen Heap on the song "Minds Without Fear" for an episode of The Dewarists.

Shekhar Ravjiani is a trained classical singer (under Ustad Niaz Ahmed Khan). He learned to play the accordion from his father, a music enthusiast, Hasmukh Ravjiani. Shekhar was a participant of Zee TV singing contest Sa Re Ga Ma Pa in 1997. He composed and sung Marathi songs "Saazni" in 2012 and "Saavli" (with Sunidhi Chauhan) in 2013.

Vishal - Shekhar both have composed more than 300 songs for Bollywood films but in compared to their contemporary fellow music director colleagues, they have lesser awards received & haven't won any major awards. Their collaboration with Siddhart Anand, Ali Abbas Jafar & Yash Raj films always have given mostly party & dance numbers but lesser memorable songs which can gain recognition's & awards.

Key
Denotes nominations received by Vishal Dadlani alone.

== Annual Central European Bollywood Awards ==
Year	Category	Recipient	Result	Ref.
2005	Best Soundtrack	Dus	Nominated	
2005	Best Song	"Dus Bahane" (from Dus)	Nominated	
2007	Best Soundtrack	Om Shanti Om	Won	
2007	Best Song	"Dastaan-E-Om Shanti Om" (from Om Shanti Om)	Won	
2007	Best Song	"Main Agar Kahoon" (from Om Shanti Om)	Nominated	
2008	Best Soundtrack	Dostana	Nominated	
2008	Best Soundtrack	Bachna Ae Haseeno	Nominated	
2008	Best Song	"Khuda Jaane Om" (from Bachna Ae Haseeno)	Nominated	
2010	Best Song	"Wallah Re Wallah" (from Tees Maar Khan)	Nominated	
2011	Best Soundtrack	Ra.One	Won	

== Apsara Film & Television Producers Guild Award ==
Year	Category	Recipient	Result	Ref.
2008	Best Music Director	Om Shanti Om	Nominated	
2008	Best Lyricist	Ankhon Mein Teri (from Om Shanti Om)	Nominated	
2010	Best Male Playback Singer	Dhan Te Nan (from Kaminey) (along with Sukhwinder Singh)	Nominated	
2011	Best Music Director	I Hate Luv Storys	Nominated	
2014	Best Music Director	Chennai Express	Nominated	

== Asian Film Awards ==
Year	Category	Recipient	Result	Ref.
2008	Best Composer	Om Shanti Om	Won	

== BIG Star Entertainment Awards ==
Year	Category	Recipient	Result	Ref.
2010	Most Entertaining Song	"Sheila Ki Jawani" (from Tees Maar Khan)	Nominated	
2010	Most Entertaining Music	Anjaana Anjaani	Nominated	
2011	Most Entertaining Song	"Chammak Challo" (from Ra.One)	Nominated	
2011	Most Entertaining Music	The Dirty Picture	Nominated	
2012	Most Entertaining Song	"Radha" (from Student Of The Year)	Nominated	
2012	Most Entertaining Music	The Dirty Picture	Nominated	
2013	Most Entertaining Singer (Male)	"Balam Pichkari" (from Yeh Jawaani Hai Deewani)	Nominated	
2013	Most Entertaining Music	The Dirty Picture	Nominated	

== Filmfare Awards ==
Year	Category	Recipient	Result	Ref.
2004	RD Burman Award for New Music Talent	Jhankaar Beats	Won	
2006	Best Music Director	Dus	Nominated	
2008	Best Music Director	Om Shanti Om	Nominated	
2008	Best Lyricist	"Ankhon Mein Teri" (from Om Shanti Om)	Nominated	
2009	Best Music Director	Dostana	Nominated	
2010	Best Male Playback Singer	"Dhan Te Nan" (from Kaminey) (along with Sukhwinder Singh)	Nominated	
2011	Best Music Director	Anjaana Anjaani	Nominated	
2011	Best Music Director	I Hate Luv Storys	Nominated	
2011	Best Lyricist	"Bin Tere" (from I Hate Luv Storys)	Nominated	
2012	Best Lyricist	"Chammak Challo" (from Ra.One) (along with Niranjan Iyengar)	Nominated	
2012	Best Music Director	Ra.One	Nominated	
2012	Best Male Playback Singer	"Chammak Challo" (from Ra.One) (along with Akon)	Nominated	
2013	Best Music Director	Student Of The Year	Nominated	
2014	Best Music Director	Chennai Express	Nominated	

== Global Indian Music Academy Awards ==
Year	Category	Recipient	Result	Ref.
2011	Best lyricist	"Tujhe Bhula Diya" (from Anjaana Anjaani) (shared with Kumaar)	Nominated	
2011	Best Film Song	"Sheila Ki Jawani" (from Tees Maar Khan)	Nominated	
2011	Best Film Album	Anjaana Anjaani	Nominated	
2011	Best Film Album	Tees Maar Khan	Nominated	
2011	Best Music Director	Anjaana Anjaani	Nominated	
2012	Best Music Director	Ra.One	Nominated	
2012	Best Film Song	"Chammak Challo" (from Ra.One)	Won	
2012	Best Film Album	The Dirty Picture	Nominated	
2012	Best Film Album	Ra.One	Nominated	
2013	Best Music Director	Student Of The Year	Nominated	
2013	Best Film Song	"Radha" (from Student Of The Year)	Nominated	
2013	Best Film Album	Student Of The Year	Nominated	
2013	Best Duet	"Radha" (from Student Of The Year) (shared with Shekhar Ravjiani, Udit Narayan, Shreya Ghoshal)	Nominated	
2014	Best Duet	"Balam Pichakari" (for Yeh Jawaani Hai Deewani) (shared with Shalmali Kholgade)	Nominated	

== International Indian Film Academy Awards ==
Year	Category	Recipient	Result	Ref.
2004	Best Music Director	Jhankaar Beats	Nominated	
2006	Best Music Director	Bluffmaster!	Nominated	
2006	Best Music Director	Dus	Nominated	
2009	Best Music Director	Dostana	Nominated	
2010	Best Playback Singer Male	"Dhan Te Nan" (from Kaminey) (along with Sukhwinder Singh)	Nominated	
2011	Best Playback Singer Male	"Adhoore" (from Break Ke Baad)	Nominated	
2011	Best Music Director	I Hate Luv Storys	Nominated	
2012	Best Music Director	Ra.One	Nominated	
2012	Best Song Recording	"Chammak Challo" (from Ra.One)	Won	
