= Ra.One (soundtrack) =

2011 film score by various artists

Soundtrack album by Vishal–Shekhar
- Released: 21 September 2011
- Recorded: 2010–2011
- Studio: YRF Studios, Mumbai; Smečky Music Studios, Prague
- Genre: Feature film soundtrack
- Length: 59:21
- Language: Hindi
- Label: T-Series
- Producer: Vishal–Shekhar; Abhijit Nalani; Abhijit Vaghani; Giorgio Tuinfort; John Stewart

Vishal–Shekhar chronology
| Rascals (2011) | Ra.One (2011) | The Dirty Picture (2011) |

Ra.One is the soundtrack album composed by the duo Vishal–Shekhar, to the 2011 Indian superhero film of the same name, written and directed by Anubhav Sinha, and starring Shahrukh Khan, Kareena Kapoor, Armaan Verma and Arjun Rampal in the lead roles. It also stars Shahana Goswami, Dalip Tahil and Chinese-british actor Tom Wu in supporting roles, along with Rajinikanth, Sanjay Dutt and Priyanka Chopra making cameo appearances.

The film is jointly produced by Eros International and Khan's production company, Red Chillies Entertainment, and was originally scheduled to release on 3 June 2011. However, due to extensive post-production work involving special effects and the 3D conversion, its release was postponed, and saw a worldwide opening during the Diwali weekend of 26 October 2011. The album features fifteen tracks, and was released on 21 September 2011 by T-Series.

== Production ==
The soundtrack of Ra.One was composed by Vishal–Shekhar whilst the lyrics were penned by Atahar Panchi, Vishal Dadlani, Kumaar, Anubhav Sinha and Anvita Dutt Guptan. In addition to composing the film's soundtrack, the music directors brought together the 200-piece Prague Philharmonic Orchestra to record the film's background score. They said, "Shahrukh and Anubhav wanted a particular sound and we have managed to bring it alive for [the film]."

Director Anubhav Sinha announced that the soundtrack would also feature two songs recorded by Senegalese American R&B singer Akon. It is said that Shahrukh Khan met the singer in New York and became his "big fan", then he asked him to fly down to India to record a song for the film. Akon arrived to Mumbai in March 2010 for two days to record both the songs Chammak Challo and Criminal. Shahrukh Khan, Kareena Kapoor and Ra.One director Anubhav Sinha held a press conference to declare the association of the Grammy Award winning singer with the film. The song Chammak Challo was co-composed by Akon and was recorded at the Yash Raj Studios. The makers of the film have complied with international copyright laws and have obtained the license to use Ben E. King's song, "Stand By Me", on which they have based the song "Dildaara".

The song Jiya Mora Ghabraaye was originally composed as an instrumental piece as a part of the background score, but due to great appreciation from the production team, it was eventually converted into an original track and added to the album. Music producer, Abhijit Vaghani stated: "Our mindset was in the zone of all superhero movies for the score (...) I've taken my engineers in my car along with a mike and recorded sounds from inside my car. The point of this was, one of the pieces, which was the 'chase' sequence was so loved by all that it eventually got converted into a track called 'Jiya Mora'. I also added the 'dub step' in the middle of the track." Vaghani also revealed that they have created a Spanish piece which he has sung in as well, it consists of an interaction scene between the two people. They have also called a Spanish translator to come up with the lyrics. The piece however, was not included in the soundtrack.

Music rights was bought by T-Series for a record sum of ₹150 million (US$1.8 million).

== Release ==
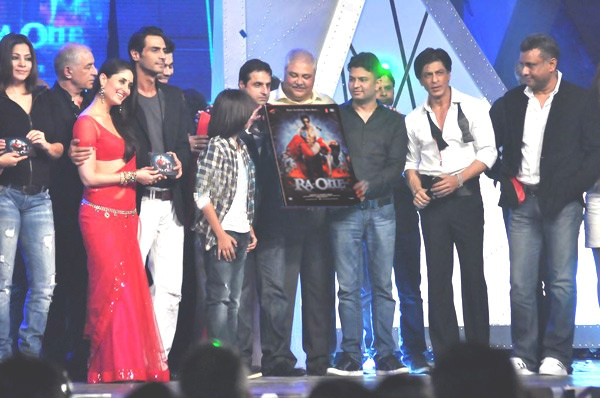
Ra.One audio launch

The soundtrack was heavily promoted pre-release. The music of the film was dedicated to Yash Johar and Bobby Chawla. Originally scheduled to release on 21 September 2011, the film's entire music album was leaked online two days earlier. Four months prior to this, the rough version of "Chammak Challo" was leaked on the internet in May 2011. In August, T-Series sent a legal notice to a jewellery brand for illegally using the unreleased song at the India International Jewellery Week 2011, asking for a compensation of ₹ 20 million.

The film's music launch took place in a huge set at Mumbai's Film City where performances were seen by the film's music directors and cast members. The star studded event's telecast rights were sold to a TV channel for ₹100 million (US$1.2 million). Radio Mirchi ran a contest through which it gave its listeners a chance to not only attend the music launch event but also meet the stars of the film.

The Tamil version of the audio was released in Satyam Cinemas, Chennai on 5 October 2011. Shahrukh Khan along with Mani Ratnam, Suhasini Maniratnam, Santosh Sivan, Soundarya Rajinikanth and Abirami Ramanathan were present in the occasion. The songs of the film have also been dubbed in Telugu, which was released on 9 October 2011. The lyrics for the Tamil version have been penned by Vairamuthu while the lyrics for the Telugu version have been penned by Vanamali, Rajshri Sudhakar and Bhuvanachandra. Both the versions of the album have been met by a huge positive response from the audience in south India.

Due to the extremely positive response for the album, especially the song Chammak challo, Akon decided to branch out and make tracks especially for Bollywood projects and now wants to have a dedicated branch into producing music for Bollywood with local talent. Sinha later revealed that there remained eight songs not selected for the final soundtrack, and that there was a possibility of releasing them in a separate album.

== Reception ==
Professional ratings
Review scores
| Source | Rating |
|---|---|
| Filmfare | 5/5 stars |
| Bollywood Hungama | 4.5/5 stars |
| Hindustan Times | 3.5/5 stars |
| Rediff.com | 3.5/5 stars |

=== Critical reception ===
Upon release, the album was met by overwhelmingly positive reviews from critics. Joginder Tuteja from Bollywood Hungama gave it 4.5 out of 5 stars, concluding: "Ra.One has brilliancy written all over it and is clearly a huge winner all the way. It isn't just the grandest score of the year but is also one of the hugest ever that has come out of Bollywood. Music here not just meets the huge expectations but also surpasses it at various junctures, hence making it a satiating experience for the listener. A definite choice of the season."

According to Devesh Sharma from Filmfare, who gave the music a rating of 5 stars from 5, the album is "worth every penny!" further adding: "A truly international album for a truly international film. The orchestration, programming and vocals fuse together to make it a truly world class album. Vishal–Shekhar have raised the bar and Ra.One would be a tough act to follow, not only for them but for others as well."

Indo-Asian News Service rated the album favourably and said: "To cut a long story short, the album delivers big-time as composer duo Vishal-Shekhar pack a killer punch. Ra.One, therefore, lives up to expectations and perhaps even surpasses some. It's more than worth it, it's a winner all the way."

The Times of India gave it a thumbs up and added: "The album of the film lives up to the expectations, thanks to composers Vishal-Shekhar for packing a musical punch for the sci-fi movie. The album is worth buying and offers some interesting and entertaining tracks. Kudos to the music composers!"

The Hindustan Times gave the album 3.5 stars from 5 and elaborating: "Shahrukh Khan's RA.One has been generating curiosity since beginning and expectations have been high from its music as well. The album of the film lives up to the expectations, thanks to composers Vishal-Shekhar for packing a musical punch for the sci-fi movie (..) On the whole the album is worth buying and offers some interesting and entertaining tracks. Kudos to the music composers!"

Sukanya Verma from Rediff.com gave it 3.5 stars and noted: "Vishal-Shekhar eventually succeed in emulating that all-important larger-than-life appeal. There's no denying this. Ra.One, with all its pomp and pizzazz, is a thoroughly enjoyable soundtrack. It's grand. It's great. It's, well, give it a shot."

== Track listing ==
Track listing (Hindi)
| No. | Title | Lyrics | Singer(s) | Length |
|---|---|---|---|---|
| 1. | "Chammak Challo" | Vishal–Shekhar, Niranjan Iyengar | Akon, Hamsika Iyer, Blaaze | 3:46 |
| 2. | "Dildaara" (Stand by Me) | Kumaar | Shafqat Amanat Ali, Vishal Dadlani, Shekhar Ravjiani, Clinton Cerejo | 4:09 |
| 3. | "Criminal" | Kumaar | Akon, Vishal Dadlani, Shruti Pathak | 5:06 |
| 4. | "Bhare Naina" | Panchhi Jalonvi | Nandini Srikar, Vishal Dadlani, Shekhar Ravjiani | 6:00 |
| 5. | "Right By Your Side" | Anvita Dutt Guptan | Siddharth Coutto | 4:22 |
| 6. | "Raftaarein" | Vishal Dadlani | Vishal Dadlani, Shekhar Ravjiani, Jolly Mukherjee | 4:29 |
| 7. | "Jiya Mora Ghabraaye" (The Chase) | Anubhav Sinha | Sukhwinder Singh, Vishal Dadlani | 4:37 |
| 8. | "Chammak Challo" (Punjabi Mix) | | Akon, Hamsika Iyer | 3:57 |
| 9. | "Comes The Light" (Theme) | | Instrumental | 1:34 |
| 10. | "I'm On" (Theme) | | Instrumental | 1:21 |
| 11. | "Song of the End" (Theme) | | Instrumental | 1:47 |
| 12. | "Chammak Challo" (Club Mix) | Vishal–Shekhar, Niranjan Iyengar | Akon, Hamsika Iyer | 4:17 |
| 13. | "Criminal" (Club Mix) | Kumaar | Akon, Vishal Dadlani, Shruti Pathak | 5:33 |
| 14. | "Chammak Challo" (International) | Vishal–Shekhar, Niranjan Iyengar | Akon | 3:47 |
| 15. | "Chammak Challo" (Remix) | Vishal–Shekhar, Niranjan Iyengar | Akon, Hamsika Iyer | 4:36 |
| Total length: | | | | 59:21 |

Track listing (Telugu)
| No. | Title | Lyrics | Singer(s) | Length |
|---|---|---|---|---|
| 1. | "Nuvve Naa Chammak Challo" | Vanamali | Vishal Dadlani, Akon (English lines), Hamsika Iyer | 3:46 |
| 2. | "Vanchichina (Criminal)" | Rajshri Sudhakar | Shankar Mahadevan, Akon (Chorus), Shalini Singh | 5:06 |
| 3. | "O Priyatama" | Vanamali | Shankar Mahadevan, Unni Menon, Mithoon | 4:09 |
| 4. | "Em Naatone" | Vanamali | Chinmayi | 6:00 |
| 5. | "Alaano Ilaano" | Vanamali | Naresh Iyer | 4:20 |
| 6. | "Sandramlaa" | Bhuvana Chandra | Shankar Mahadevan | 4:28 |
| Total length: | | | | 25:49 |

All tracks are written by Vairamuthu.

Track listing (Tamil)
| No. | Title | Singer(s) | Length |
|---|---|---|---|
| 1. | "Muthada Chammak Challo" | Vishal Dadlani, Akon (English lines), Hamsika Iyer, | 3:46 |
| 2. | "Pachai Poove" | Shankar Mahadevan, Akon (Chorus), Shalini Singh | 5:06 |
| 3. | "Poovulagamaa" | Shankar Mahadevan, Unni Menon, Mithoon | 4:09 |
| 4. | "En Uyir" | Chinmayi | 6:00 |
| 5. | "Ulagam Ulagam" | Naresh Iyer | 4:20 |
| 6. | "Yarukum Nenje" | Shankar Mahadevan | 4:28 |
| Total length: | | | 25:49 |

== Awards ==
Filmfare Awards (Nominated)

- Best Music Director – Vishal–Shekhar
- Best Lyricist – Vishal Dadlani & Niranjan Iyengar – Chammak Challo
- Best Male Playback Singer – Akon & Vishal Dadlani for Chammak Challo
- Best Male Playback Singer – Shafqat Amanat Ali for Dildaara
