= Dostana (soundtrack) =

Dostana (Original Motion Picture Soundtrack)

Soundtrack album by Vishal–Shekhar
- Released: 10 October 2008
- Genre: Feature film soundtrack
- Length: 30:49
- Language: Hindi
- Label: Sony BMG
- Producer: Vishal–Shekhar

Vishal–Shekhar chronology
Bachna Ae Haseeno (2008)	Dostana (Original Motion Picture Soundtrack) (2008)	Aladin (2009)

Dostana (Original Motion Picture Soundtrack) is the soundtrack album accompanying the 2008 film of the same name directed by Tarun Mansukhani and produced by Dharma Productions, starring Abhishek Bachchan, John Abraham and Priyanka Chopra. Vishal–Shekhar composed the six-song soundtrack, with lyrics written by Anvita Dutt Guptan, Kumaar and Vishal Dadlani. The soundtrack was released on 10 October 2008 by Sony BMG.

== Background ==
Dostana's soundtrack consisted of six songs composed by the duo Vishal–Shekhar. Anvita Dutt Guptan wrote the lyrics for three songs, and Kumaar wrote two songs. In addition to being a co-composer and vocalist on four songs, Vishal Dadlani wrote the lyrics for one. Besides Dadlani, Shankar Mahadevan, Sunidhi Chauhan, Master Saleem, Shreya Ghoshal, Amanat Ali and Shaan provided vocals for the other songs. Farah Khan choreographed the song "Desi Girl" whereas Vaibhavi Merchant choreographed the other songs. The soundtrack album was released on 10 October 2008 by Sony Music.

== Reception ==
The soundtrack received highly positive reviews from music critics. Joginder Tuteja of Bollywood Hungama rated it four out of five, calling it an "excellent album": "There is not one single number which doesn't work. In fact, if three soft numbers 'Kuch Kum', 'Khabar Nahin' and 'Jaane Kyun' are the pick of the lot, then 'Desi Girl' is a definite must for the dance floors. 'Maa Da Laadla' and 'Shut up & Bounce' have their own place under the sun."

Nikhil Taneja of Hindustan Times also gave it a positive review, calling it "a surefire chartbuster". According to News18, "Except for 'Shut Up and Bounce', each song in Dostana is wrapped in fun and peppiness on the one hand and melody and rhythm on the other." Karthik Srinivasan of Milliblog wrote "one of those mixed bag soundtracks that has Vishal and Shekhar sticking to their familiar, tried and tested sounds [...] a good listen, but nothing really to rave about." In contrast, Sukanya Verma of Rediff.com wrote "While Dostana's music is nice and peppy for most part, it's nothing extraordinary. It's certainly not the best from Dharma Productions."

According to the Indian trade website Box Office India, with around 1,700,000 units sold, this film's soundtrack album was the year's fourth highest-selling.

== Track listing ==
Dostana (Original Motion Picture Soundtrack) track listing
No.	Title	Lyrics	Artist(s)	Length
1.	"Jaane Kyun"	Anvita Dutt Guptan	Vishal Dadlani	4:37
2.	"Shut Up & Bounce"	Anvita Dutt Guptan	Vishal Dadlani, Sunidhi Chauhan	4:37
3.	"Desi Girl"	Kumaar	Shankar Mahadevan, Sunidhi Chauhan, Vishal Dadlani	5:06
4.	"Khabar Nahin"	Anvita Dutt Guptan	Vishal Dadlani, Shreya Ghoshal, Amanat Ali, Raja Hasan	4:19
5.	"Maa Da Laadla"	Kumaar	Master Saleem, Sunidhi Chauhan	4:05
6.	"Kuch Kum"	Vishal Dadlani	Shaan	5:40
Total length:				30:49

Bonus Songs

7.Maa Da Laadla (Mummy Mix) 4: 06

8.Maa Da Laadla (Arabian Dance Mix) 3:48

9.Dostana Medley 10:49

Total length:48:52

== Accolades ==
Accolades for Dostana (Original Motion Picture Soundtrack)
Award	Date (Note: Linked to the article about the awards held that year, wherever possible.)	Category	Recipient(s) and nominee(s)	Result	Ref(s)
Filmfare Awards	28 February 2009	Best Music Director	Vishal–Shekhar	Nominated	
International Indian Film Academy Awards	13 June 2009	Best Music Director	Vishal–Shekhar	Nominated	
International Indian Film Academy Awards	13 June 2009	Best Female Playback Singer	Sunidhi Chauhan (for "Desi Girl")	Nominated	
Screen Awards	14 January 2009	Best Music Director	Vishal–Shekhar	Nominated	
Screen Awards	14 January 2009	Best Male Playback Singer	Shankar Mahadevan (for "Desi Girl")	Nominated	
