= Hamsika Iyer =

Indian singer based in Mumbai (born 1972)

- Born: 12 April 1972 (age 54); Pune, Maharashtra, India
- Origin: Mumbai, Maharashtra, India
- Genres: Playback singing, jingles, Carnatic music, Hindustani music, world music
- Occupation: Singer
- Years active: 1996–present

Hamsika Iyer (born 12 April 1972) is an Indian singer based in Mumbai. She is a regular voice with ad world jingles and Marathi tele-serials, and has sung songs in Kannada, Tamil, Hindi, Malayalam and Bengali movies.

== International collaborations and tours ==
Hamsika Iyer is an Indian vocalist who has made significant international contributions to music. She was the Indian vocalist for Prem Joshua's 2014 album Kashi. Since 2012, she has also been a performer with the international band Juno Reactor. In August 2012, Hamsika performed with Aamir John Hadad's band, Zoobazar, in Valencia, Spain.Earlier, in November 2011, she was featured alongside the Rajagopalan Quartet at UrbanFOLK in Bangalore. Hamsika also gained recognition in September 2011 when she sang Chammak Challo with Akon for the film Ra.One.

== Discography ==
- "Nindiya" – Fateh (2025) with Tineke Van Ingelgem (music by Vivek Hariharan)
- "Main Faraar Sa" – Running Shaadi (2017) with Anupam Roy (music by Anupam Roy)
- Kashi (2014) with Prem Joshua & Chintan, as Indian vocalist in the album
- "Ninna Danigaagi" (Version 1) – Savaari 2 (2014) with Karthik (music by Manikanth Kadri)
- "Bekhauff" – Marathi – Satyamev Jayate (2014)
- "1 2 3 4 Get on the Dance Floor" – Chennai Express (2013) with Vishal Dadlani, Sricharan Kasturirangan (music by Vishal-Shekhar)
- Vishwaroopam (2012), backing vocals on "Unnai Kaanadhu" (music by Shankar-Ehsaan-Loy)
- Delhi Safari (2012) (music by Shankar-Ehsaan-Loy)
- "Lonely" – Khiladi 786 (2012) with Himesh Reshammiya, Yo Yo Honey Singh
- "Alai Payuthe" – English Vinglish (Tamil Dubbed), music by Amit Trivedi (2012)
- Satyamev Jayate TV series, Music by Ram Sampath – "Sakhi", "Rupaiya", "Ghar Yaad Aata Hai" (Tamil/Telugu/Malayalam versions), "Chanda Pe Dance" (all languages, except Hindi)
- "Kala Kalyat" – Hridayanath (2012), Marathi (music by Santosh Muley)
- "Kanna Mucche" – Amet Asal Eemet Kusal (2012), music by Umang Doshi, Tulu
- Abhimaan Geet by Kaushal Inamdar (2007), Marathi
- "Mann Chimb Paavasaali" – Ajintha (2012), Marathi
- "Lal Hori" (Chhand Othaatale) – Ajintha (2012) with Suresh Wadkar, Swanand Kirkire, Kaushal Inamdar
- "Raabta (Siyaah Raatein)" – Agent Vinod (2012) with Arijit Singh, Joy
- "Chhaya Bhitu Chhaya" – Aparajita Tumi (2012), Bengali
- "Chammak Challo" – Ra.One (2011) with Akon
- "Jay Jagadish" – Ganaraj Adhiraj (2011) with Salim Merchant and Gulraj Singh
- "Jhoola Jhool" – Stanley Ka Dabba (2011)
- "Athadilo Edo" – Kudirithe Cup Coffee (2011), Telugu
- "Lalita" (vocals) – Spirit and Spice (2010), George Brooks
- "Ishq Barse" – Raajneeti (2010) with Pranab Biswas, Swanand Kirkire
- "Ninagende Vishesha" – Prithvi (2010) with Kunal Ganjawala (music by Manikanth Kadri)
- "Kuchi Kuchi Twist" – Quick Gun Murugun (2009) with Vijay Prakash
- "Jheeni Jheeni" – Phir Kabhi (2009) with Bhupinder Singh
- "Urrat Dhadhdhad" – Sunder Mazhe Ghar (2009), Marathi
- "Kadhaigal Pesum" – Angaadi Theru (2009) with Benny Dayal
- "Chaal Apni" – Sikandar (2009) with Rishikesh Kamerkar
- "Fallen" – 3 Cities (2008) with Bombay Dub Orchestra
- "Bagundey Bagundey" – Chintakayala Ravi (2008) with Vijay Prakash
- "Khushboo Sa" – Khoya Khoya Chand (2007)
- "Raaz ki ek baat" – Its Breaking News (2007) with Bhushan Marathe, Clinton
- "Haqeeqat ne aisa pakda girebaan" – Its Breaking News (2007)
- Loins of Punjab Presents (2007)
- "Maa tere haath, Jaane kyun aisa lagta hai" – Meri Awaz Ko Mil Gayi Roshni (2007)
- "Chanda re" (The moon song) – Eklavya: The Royal Guard (2007)
- "The love theme" – Eklavya: The Royal Guard (2007)
- "Mugurtha neram" – Mercury Pookal (2006) with Kunal Ganjawala
- Kal – Yesterday And Tomorrow (2005)
- "Saawalith Majhya" – Not Only Mrs. Raut (2003)
- "Jheel jaisi teri aankhen" – Jajantaram Mamantaram (2003) with Narayan Parasuram
- "Pyaar se dekh le" – Calcutta Mail (2003) with Sonu Nigam

She has also sung songs with the band 3 Brothers & a Violin for the Karadi Tales audio book series for kids.

== Awards ==
- Nominated – Zee Chitra Gaurav Puraskar for Best Playback Singer – Female For Song Man chimb Pawsali (Ajintha)

== Concerts ==
- Juno Reactor, Tours of 2012

Venue: Asia Tour (Japan), Middle East Tour (Jerusalem), Kubana Festival Russia

- Vivek Rajagopalan Quartet – November 2011

Venue: UrbanFolk Bangalore
Vivek Rajagopalan is a percussionist and musician based in Mumbai. This concert was sponsored by Taj Vivanta.
