= Chammak Challo =

Single by Akon and Hamsika Iyer

from the album Ra. One
- Language: Hindi, Tamil
- Released: 21 September 2011
- Recorded: 2010–2011
- Studio: YRF Studios
- Genre: World, pop-folk, R&B, synthpop, filmi, Bollywood
- Length: 3:46
- Label: T-Series
- Songwriters: Vishal Dadlani, Niranjan Iyengar, Giorgio Tuinfort
- Producer: Giorgio Tuinfort

Music video
- Chammak Challo on YouTube

"Chammak Challo" (transl. Flashy Girl) is a song performed by Akon and Hamsika Iyer, and composed by Akon, Giorgio Tuinfort as well as music director duo Vishal–Shekhar (Vishal Dadlani and Shekhar Ravjiani) and by Gobind Singh, as a part of the soundtrack for the 2011 Bollywood film Ra.One. It is Akon's first musical collaboration with Indian artists. There are four other versions of the song in the album, including a remix by Abhijit Vaghani, another remix by DJ Khushi and an international version sung solely by Akon. The song, along with the rest of the soundtrack, was officially released on 21 September 2011.

"Chammak Challo" was dubbed as the "trademark of Ra.One's publicity campaign". The song was named the most downloaded song and video of the year in India in a survey by wireless telephone major Airtel. It was rated as the best item number of 2011 in a Mid-Day poll. The song also topped the Mirchi Top 100 charts as the song of year. "Chammak Challo" also entered the Top 10 "World Songs" list of iTunes in eight countries, reaching No. 1 at three of them. Due to the extremely positive response for the song, Akon decided to branch out and make tracks especially for Bollywood projects and wanted to have a dedicated branch to produce music for Bollywood with local talent. Subsequently, Akon received a nomination for Best Male Playback Singer at the 2012 Filmfare Awards.

== Production ==
"Chammak Challo" was composed by music duo Vishal–Shekhar and co-composed by Akon who arrived in Mumbai on 8 March 2010 for two days to record it. The portion of the song sung by Akon was recorded on 9 March 2010 along with portions of the song Criminal from the same soundtrack. Shahrukh Khan, Kareena Kapoor and Ra.One director Anubhav Sinha held a press conference to declare the association of the Grammy-nominated singer with the film. was recorded at the Yash Raj Studios. The lyrics were penned by Vishal Dadlani and Niranjan Iyengar. The lyrics are primarily in Hindi and Tamil, with a few English lines included.

Along with the English parts, Akon sang parts of the song in Hindi by himself. Hamsika Iyer sang the Hindi and Tamil parts. The recording of the song's video was done on 22 December 2010 in front of the then President of Russia, Dmitry Medvedev. Hamsika Iyer sang her portion in early 2011. Post-recording polishing was done in 2011 for the song. According to the music directors, the Senegalese American R&B singer had no problems voicing the Hindi lyrics: "It was really easy for Akon. When he came to the studio and we told him that he would have to sing in Hindi too, he got really excited. Once he heard the lines, he started singing fluently. It took him only three (to) four hours to learn...he picked up everything so well," said Shekhar. The song is produced by Giorgio Tuinfort, who produced Gwen Stefani's "The Sweet Escape", featuring Akon.

The remix version by DJ Khushi was a club mix with more electronic sounds, dholki and vocal effects. Khushi was referred to Khan by the Moranis for remixing the song; Khushi made a demo and sent it to Khan who was impressed by it and told him to complete the track. In an interview, Khushi said: "Remixing 'Chammak Challo' was not just an amazing and an exciting experience but it also came with a lot of responsibility to make a track that complements the song as it was already a very big hit even before the release."

The song faced controversy when the initial version was leaked on the internet on 30 May 2011. This leak was a complete full-length song, and the initial recording of it. The background flute in this leaked version was louder and more prominent than in the final version, and the flute was also played in several extra places, the music did not sound polished and instead felt rough and harsh in some places in the song, and the female portion sung by Hamsika Iyer was not there. The third verse of the song, sung by Hamsika Iyer in the final version, was completely missing, and the music continued to play as a placeholder, while instead of the female chorus that followed the third verse, the same chorus by Akon was repeated again, in the leaked version.

== Reception ==
=== Critical reception ===
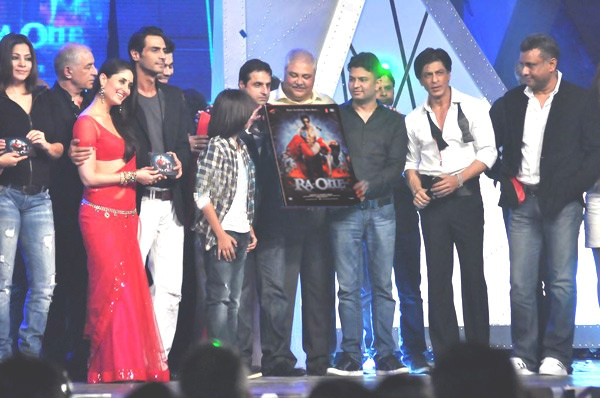
Ra.One audio launch. Shahrukh and Kareena are seen in their "Chammak Challo" costumes.

Bollywood Hungama described it as "A grand song by all means, with huge production values that would be assuring enough for Akon to believe that this one can compete at an international level, 'Chammak Challo' is a fantastic amalgamation of Indian, Middle East and Western sounds that gives it a distinguished appeal." Ruchika Kher from The Times of India identified the song as "A clear winner all the way, the song, which has Hindi, English and Tamil words in the lyrics, makes you groove [...] A fun dance number, 'Chammak Challo' is here to stay and it will surely become the DJs' favourite". Indo-Asian News Service said "International pop star Akon sings in English and surprisingly well in Hindi, making 'Chammak Challo' ride high on its novelty factor. Hamsika Iyer, who has sung for films like Raajneeti and Khoya Khoya Chand in the past, supports him beautifully, accompanying the English-Hindi vocals with a little Tamil strewn in. Primarily a dance track, 'Chammak Challo' is here to stay." He also praised the remixes adding "The song also has a couple of remixes, but don't dismiss them as ordinary fare. A Punjabi Mix adds some bhangra to the beats while DJ Khushi's version, simply titled 'Chammak Challo Remix', is explosive. A third, international version is what his fans will hear globally-this one is pure Akon, without Hamsika to accompany him." Sukanya Verma from Rediff.com praised the song calling it "A scorching mishmash of Arabic influences and Bollywood-style bhangra amid Hamsika Iyer's swiftly-pronounced Tamil lyrics, the showstopper song's perfectly-timed arrangement and vivacious rhythm makes it a win-win."

Vivek Warrier was impressed by Akon's Hindi and said "Full marks to Akon for his wonderful Hindi – yes, he sings 'Chammak Challo' in Hindi. He is, in fact, better than Remo. The song has good use of Vocoder and other classic 'Akon-ic' effects which also includes the "Oh oo oo" which is what Akon is known for". He also noted that "the three remixes of the song, also included in the album, add value to the album from a commercial point of view". Devesh Sharma from Filmfare said "'Chammak Challo' rules – and how! The song, sung by international R&B icon Akon, is superbly produced by Giorgio Tuinfort. Tuinfort turns Vishal-Shekhar's tunes into a haunting medley that invades your brains and refuses to go away. Kareena sings in such a way that you believe that it's actually Shah Rukh Khan who's crooning the song. Getting the Hindi diction right is by itself an achievement. Hamsika Iyer accompanies Akon in the film version and her full throated voice adds to the charm." He also appreciated the remixes calling them "well crafted".

=== Commercial and chart performance ===
"Chammak Challo" is a favourite at Indian nightclubs. The song also occupied the top position at the Indian Singles Chart for several weeks. The remixed version of "Chammak Challo" by DJ Khushi has been "hitting the popularity charts".

== Music video ==
Vishal–Shekhar – "Chammak Challo"
A 50-second sample of the song "Chammak Challo"

The music video of the song is picturised on the lead pair of the film, Shahrukh Khan and Kareena Kapoor, dancing together in a specially constructed set at Yash Raj Studios. The music video received mixed to positive reviews, with some critics praising its fresh and hybrid style of choreography by Ganesh Hegde, while others criticising the costumes, especially those of the background dancers. While shooting for the song in Mumbai, Russian President Dmitry Medvedev visited Yash Raj Studios to watch Khan and Kapoor at work.

Red Chillies, Khan's production house created a video for the remixed version by Delhi-based DJ Khushi and put it up on the official YouTube channel of the film. The video contained shots from the original song, with the remix as the background score. Khushi said "I met SRK recently at an awards ceremony in Gurgaon, where he said, 'I had to make a video for this. It was the best remix on the CD and it was getting great feedback.' So, he made the video." Within the first couple of days, the video received more than 400,000 views from social networking sites.

=== Costume ===
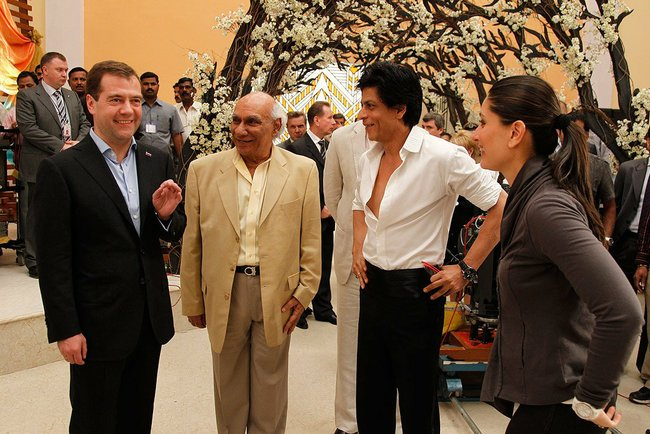
Russian President Dmitry Medvedev on the sets of "Chammak Challo"

The costume of Kareena Kapoor in the song received widespread media coverage. Kapoor wore a red sari draped in the style of a dhoti. The sari along with Kapoor's look was designed by Manish Malhotra. Subsequently, the sari became colloquially known as "the Kareena wala red."

Fashion experts commented on the topic, unanimously praising Kapoor's look. Film stylist Samidha Wanganoo applauded Kapoor's ability to carry off a "fiery and bold" colour like red, and claimed that "It [red] makes the haute black look so redundant now." Mauritius-based fashion consultant Kiran Gidwani-Tolaram said, "The red that Kareena is wearing in the song is a very vibrant and hot shade. It is natural when someone as stunning as her wears a bold colour like that, it is bound to be in vogue and dictate trends." Gidwani-Tolaram reported about a "flood" of demands for exactly the same style of sari, and commented that the particular style was the favourite of the Mauritian Prime Minister's wife. However, Sangita Kathiwada, creative director of a prominent Mumbai fashion store, dismissed the theory that Kapoor had popularised red saris and said, "What is Kareena Kapoor wala red? I mean Kareena is gorgeous and looks lovely in the "Chammak Challo" song and many more saris will sell because she just looks stunning wearing it. But I still wouldn't go as far as calling it the Kareena Kapoor wala red."

== Accolades ==
Year	Award Ceremony	Category	Recipient	Result	Reference(s)
2011	Mirchi Music Awards	Song of the Year	-	Nominated	
2011	Mirchi Music Awards	Best Item Song of the Year	-	Nominated	
2011	Mirchi Music Awards	Best Programmer & Arranger of the Year	Abhijit Nalani & Giorgio Tuinfort	Won	
2011	Mirchi Music Awards	Best Song Recording	Vijay Dayal & Mark 'Exit' Goodchild	Won	

== Track listing ==
- CD single
1. "Chammak Challo" (album version) – 3:46
2. "Chammak Challo" (remix by Abhijit Vaghani) – 4:36
3. "Chammak Challo" (remix by DJ Khushi) – 4:17
