= Dostana (2008 film) =

2008 Indian film by Tarun Mansukhani

- Theatrical release poster
- Directed by: Tarun Mansukhani
- Written by: Tarun Mansukhani
- Dialogues by: Anvita Dutt Guptan
- Produced by: Hiroo Yash Johar; Karan Johar
- Starring: Abhishek Bachchan; John Abraham; Priyanka Chopra; Kirron Kher; Bobby Deol
- Cinematography: Ayananka Bose
- Edited by: Manan Sagar
- Music by: Songs: Vishal–Shekhar; Score: Salim–Sulaiman
- Production company: Dharma Productions
- Distributed by: Yash Raj Films
- Release date: 14 November 2008
- Running time: 149 minutes
- Country: India
- Language: Hindi
- Budget: ₹40 crore
- Box office: ₹87.15 crore

Dostana (transl. Friendship) is a 2008 Indian Hindi-language romantic comedy film written and directed by Tarun Mansukhani and produced by Hiroo Yash Johar and Karan Johar under Dharma Productions. The film stars Abhishek Bachchan, John Abraham, Priyanka Chopra and Bobby Deol, reuniting Bachchan and Abraham after Dhoom (2004). Set in Miami, it follows two men who pretend to be gay to share an apartment with a girl; eventually, both fall in love with her.

Mansukhani conceived the film as a tale of 3 friends living together, drawing inspiration from his own experience. Wanting to add something different to the script, he later decided to introduce homosexuality, which he thought was unexplored by Indian films, to shed light on the issue for the Indian audience. Manish Malhotra designed Chopra's costumes, and Aki Narula designed costumes for the rest of the cast. The soundtrack was composed by Vishal–Shekhar; Guptan, Kumaar and Vishal Dadlani wrote the lyrics, while Salim–Sulaiman composed the background score. Principal photography took place in Miami, Florida over a two-month period in the first half of 2008. Dostana was the first mainstream Indian film with a gay element and has been credited for exploring a topic largely ignored by Hindi cinema.

Dostana was released on 14 November 2008 to positive reviews from critics, who praised its performances, the chemistry between its three leads and its direction, music, cinematography, humor, costumes and style. A box-office success, it grossed over ₹871 million, becoming one of the highest grossing Hindi films of 2008. At the 54th Filmfare Awards, Dostana received 9 nominations, including Best Film, Best Actor (Bachchan), Best Supporting Actress (Kher) and Best Music Director (Vishal–Shekhar).

Dostana was influential in creating fashion trends in India, with Chopra's silver sari, worn in the song "Desi Girl", becoming popular. Abraham's yellow trunks, Chopra's golden swimsuit, and the actors' looks and style also received considerable attention and were popular with youngsters. Dostana is regarded as one of the most stylish and trendsetting of Indian films, with Filmfare ranking it #1 in a 2013 poll.

== Plot ==
Sameer "Sam" Acharya, a male nurse and Kunal Chauhan, a fashion photographer are fun-loving, womanising bachelors in Miami. They first meet at a friend's place after a night out with girls and run into each other again when they are interested in renting the same apartment. The apartment belongs to Neha Melwani, who works for Verve. She lives there with her aunt Ishita "Ishu" Melwani, who refuses to sublet the apartment to either of them since Neha wants girls as flatmates. After meeting a gay soldier, Sam persuades a reluctant Kunal to pretend that they are lovers so they can rent the apartment. They regret their decision when they meet Neha since they are attracted to her. The three become good friends, and Sam and Kunal fall in love with her.

As Sam and Kunal continue the charade, Kunal convinces Sam to apply for a domestic partnership with him, as Sam is a UK citizen and Kunal is not. Unknown to them, the approval letter is sent to Sam's conservative mother Rani, who lives in London. Neha's gay boss, Murli "M" Lokhande, resigns as Verve's editor and must choose his successor. Hoping to impress him and get the job, Neha invites him for dinner at her house and asks Sam and Kunal to entertain him. A US immigration agent visits them for a surprise inspection and joins the party. Chaos ensues when Rani arrives from London to confront her son about his newfound sexuality. Sam tries to deny his relationship with Kunal, but Ishu and the immigration agent affirm that they are a couple. M becomes upset because Neha had told him Sam and Kunal were both single, and leaves.

At Neha's office the following day, M announces that Abhimanyu "Abhi" Singh will be the new editor. Neha, upset at being passed over for promotion, goes home and is consoled by Rani; in turn, she helps Rani accept her son's sexuality. Kunal and Sam help Neha with a project assigned by Abhi, who is impressed with her work. They later take Neha on separate dates, both telling her that they love her. Neha, convinced that they are gay, sees the dates as friendly outings. When Abhi and Neha begin dating, Sam and Kunal sabotage the budding relationship by giving Abhi inappropriate advice; this irritates Neha, and she and Abhi quarrel. When Neha discovers Kunal and Sam's plan, she misinterprets it as jealousy towards her being with Abhi (thinking they are attracted to him).

Sam and Kunal redirect their efforts into frightening Veer, Abhi's five-year-old son, about his future with Neha. During a basketball game, Neha discovers that Abhi plans to propose to her and asks for Kunal and Sameer's advice. They ask her to turn him down, admitting that their homosexuality is a ruse and they both love her. Veer tells Abhi about his fears, and during the game, Abhi breaks up with Neha. She tearfully evicts Kunal and Sameer from her apartment, and resigns from Verve.

A few months later Kunal and Sam meet in court, where they are picking up residence permits. Recognizing the value of their friendship with Neha and each other, they reconcile. They find Neha at a fashion show and try to apologise, but she refuses to see them. Unaware of Neha and Abhi's break-up, they ask about the wedding and Neha tells them about Veer's fears. Kunal and Sam admit that they manipulated the boy, angering Neha and Abhi. Kunal and Sam climb onto the stage and beg Neha's forgiveness. The crowd encourages them to beg on their knees, say that they love her and blow her kisses, but nothing softens her. When the crowd tells them to kiss each other, they refuse. Neha and Abhi turn to leave, and Kunal kisses a reluctant Sam. Abhi and Neha are both amazed by the lengths to which they will go to regain her trust; Neha forgives them. Kunal and Sam then get down on their knees and propose to Abhi on her behalf. Amused, Abhi agrees.

Two months later, Neha playfully asks Kunal and Sam if they felt anything for each other when they pretended to be gay; they say "no", remembering their kiss. Neha dismisses the conversation remarking it is indeed a "touchy topic".

== Cast ==
The cast is listed below:

- Abhishek Bachchan as Sameer "Sam" Acharya
- John Abraham as Kunal Chauhan
- Priyanka Chopra as Neha Melwani
- Bobby Deol as Abhimanyu "Abhi" Singh
- Kirron Kher as Rani Kaur Acharya
- Sushmita Mukherjee as Ishita "Ishu" Melwani
- Boman Irani as Murli "M" Lokhande
- Shrey Bawa as Veer Singh
- Shilpa Shetty as an item dancer in the song "Shut Up & Bounce"

== Production ==
=== Development ===
During the production of Karan Johar's ensemble musical romantic drama Kabhi Alvida Naa Kehna (2006), Tarun Mansukhani conceived a film about 3 friends who share an apartment. After the production wrapped, Karan Johar told him that Mansukhani was ready to direct a film and should write a script; if Johar liked it, he would produce the film. He set the film in Miami, since he liked its lifestyle and culture: "People in Miami work hard and party harder and I wanted to capture that in my film." Mansukhani worked for eight months on the script; Johar liked it, and asked him about the cast. In an interview, Manuskhani described Dostana as a story of "how the three strangers come together, live together in an apartment and have their moments of happiness and sorrow."

The director was inspired by his own experiences: "The germ for that comes from my own childhood memories of school-time friends. I have lived in boarding school for most of my childhood and the friends that I have today are the ones whom I got in touch with during 4th/5th standard. I may not speak to them for years but they are a family whom I can call up at 4 am without hesitation." Manuskhani soon realised that Bollywood had explored friendship, live–in relationships, marriage and divorce many times, and he wanted to do something different for his debut film. He decided to use sexuality to shed light on the issue, untouched by Bollywood, for the Indian audience.

Mansukhani later added the gay storyline because he thought it was an issue that needed to be touched on. However, the director did not want the film to be serious or preachy: "I also realise that when you preach via cinema nobody wants to hear it". "The film has a message, if you get it, great. If you don't, no problem, sit back, relax and enjoy the film", he said about making it a romantic comedy. In February 2008, Johar announced the film's title Dostana; the producer named it after a 1980 film produced by his father, Yash Johar. Asked if his film was also a love triangle, he replied: "Well, yes and no. Though it's a love story, there's a never-before twist in the tale. All I can say on record is that we've never had a love triangle like this before." The gay storyline was not disclosed until the trailers were released. Manan Sagar was hired to edit the film, and the duo Salim–Sulaiman composed the background score.

=== Casting ===
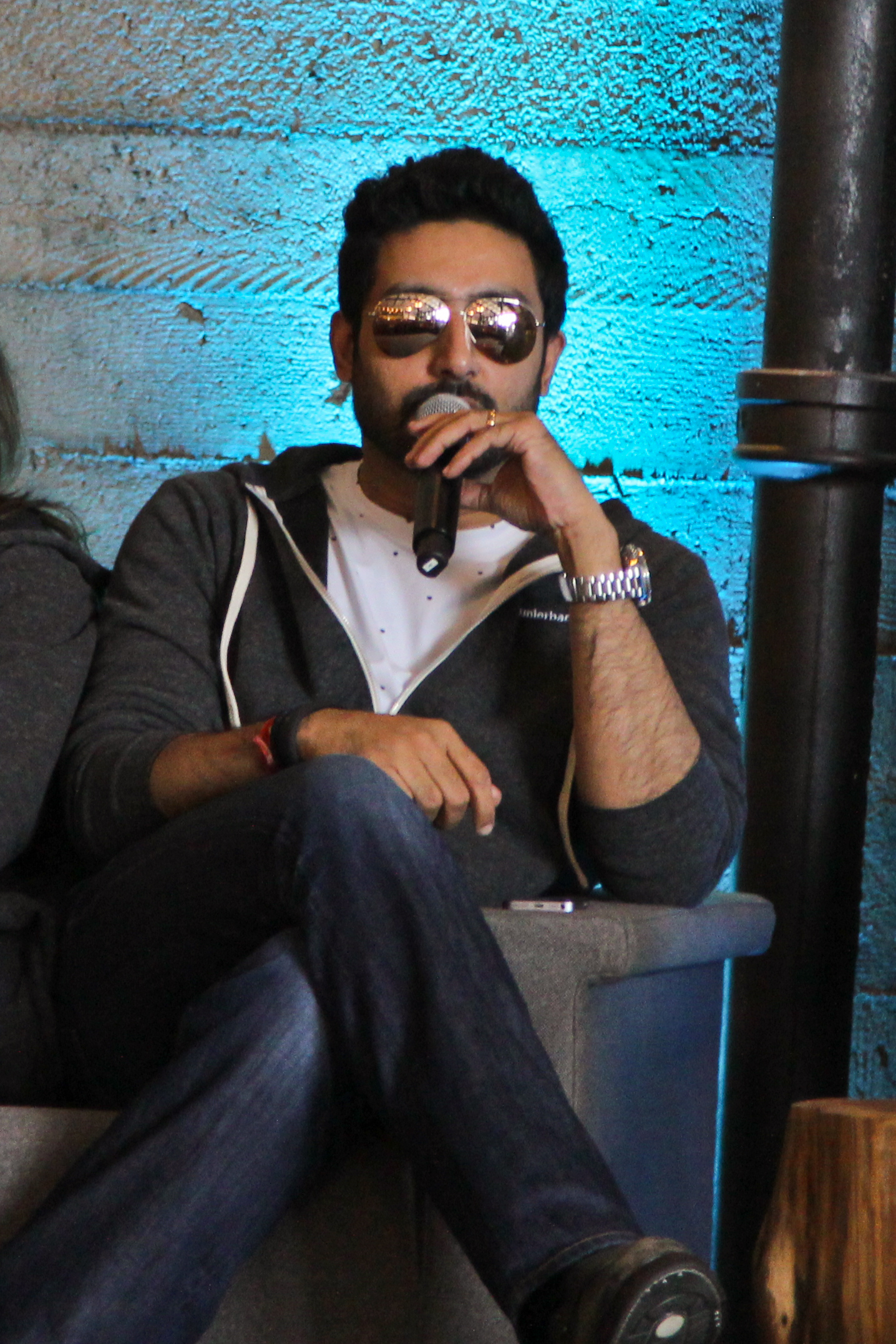
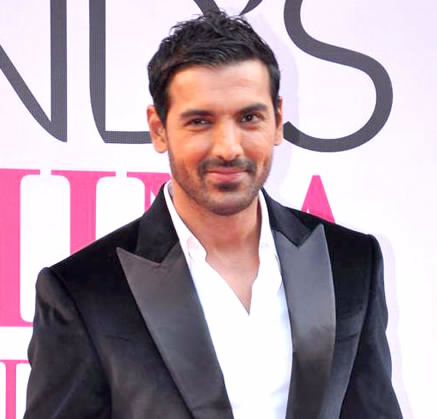
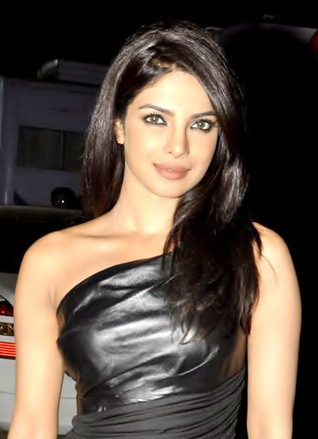
(Left to Right): Bachchan, Abraham and Chopra played the lead roles.

Abhishek Bachchan, John Abraham and Priyanka Chopra were cast in the lead roles. Aishwarya Rai was originally offered the lead role, but she refused it because she did not want to end up with another man in her first film with her husband (Bachchan) after their marriage. After Dostana's release, she regretted the decision. Saif Ali Khan refused the role of Kunal because he was uncomfortable with a husband and wife (Bachchan and Rai) playing the other two leads. In early April 2008, Shilpa Shetty was signed for a special appearance in one of the film's songs.

Bachchan said that Sam was his most difficult character to play, and he worked hard on his gestures and mannerisms: "I had to work very hard to portray a straight man acting gay. It could easily have gone over-board. I wanted to avoid making the character caricatural [sic]. Barring one portion ... we kept it controlled." Bachchan and Abraham, who had gained weight for their earlier films, had to lose the weight and become more muscular. Although Chopra agreed to wear a swimsuit, she refused to wear a bikini. The actress said that she did not lose any weight (as the media speculated), but worked out for a toned look in her films; she was also filming Fashion (2008) at the time. According to Chopra, "For Fashion, I had to put on six kilos and later had to shed chip by chip as the character progressed in the film. My body structure in Dostana is more toned than in Fashion as it is a completely beach film. I've worked very hard on my body."

=== Costume design ===
Manish Malhotra and Aki Narula designed Dostana's costumes (Malhotra for Chopra and Narula for the rest of the cast). It was Malhotra's second time working with Chopra; the first was for Andaaz (2003). Since the film was set in Miami, he decided on a holiday look; Chopra's character, a fashion editor, would wear stylish, chic clothes. The actress had "a lot of shorts, tank tops, tees, formal jackets and bikini tops", and her wardrobe had a "beach vibe." Malhotra gave her a very young, "girlie" look. He designed clean lines with many colours, toning down Chopra's accessories: "You will notice that none of her dresses have any embroidery or designs either. All her outfits are mainly in satin, chiffon and georgette."

The designer gave Chopra shorts and singlets with loose silhouettes. Malhotra said that although the actress prefers grey, black and white, he decided to experiment with bright solid colours like "the ones in the citrus family." Chopra was initially apprehensive about the colours, but Malhotra changed her mind: "Priyanka has worn colour like never before in this film. There's lime, tangerine, cranberry, pink, yellow, purple ... the rainbow." He wanted to design the swimsuit in a metallic gold or silver; he and Chopra settled on gold because of her dusky skin, which they thought a perfect foil for the colour. The golden swimsuit was created by combining two swimsuits; because they were small, Malhotra attached the second one to make the swimsuit seen in the film.

Although Johar and Mansukhani wanted Chopra to wear a gown for the song "Desi Girl", Malhotra suggested a sari. They considered it unsuitable for a character in Miami, but Malhotra said that if they could do a song like "Desi Girl" in Miami, Chopra could wear a sari and "treat it like a dress". They later agreed on the sari, Chopra's only Indian costume in the film. Malhotra designed a modern sari, giving it a Western feel with a long, silver-sequined skirt and a bikini-type blouse. The designer chose silver because only a silver sari could compete with the golden swimsuit.

Unfamiliar with Miami culture, Aki Narula spent time there before filming began to learn how Miamians dressed and gave Bachchan long cargo shorts and cotton shirts in bright colours. According to the designer, the most interesting parts of his styling were the matching scarves, which resembled extended shirt collars. Narula gave Bachchan cargo and embroidered pants and sunglasses. The embroidery, primarily dragons and palm trees, conveyed a tropical summer look.

Narula gave Abraham (who plays a fashion photographer who works and lives on the beach) cargo and boxer shorts, trunks for swimming scenes, and jerseys and football shorts in windcheater fabrics. He also gave him flip-flops, canvas shoes and T-shirts with slogans such as a "Use A Condom", which the designer considered important. Malhotra and Narula collaborated on the colour palette: "If Manish would give Priyanka yellow, then I would go for a green for John and a pink for Abhishek." Narula also designed for Deol, Irani, Kher and Mukherjee. He chose brands such as Dolce & Gabbana and Gucci for Deol (the Verve editor), giving him sleek suits with short jackets and skinny pants with narrow bottoms. Kirron Kher, who played Bachchan's mother, was styled as a typical Punjabi salwar-kameez-clad woman with gota embroidery. For Sushmita Mukherjee, who played Chopra's aunt, Narula chose animal prints and diamonds, pearls, silver and gold: "When we shopped for her it was like 'oh god, this is so tacky, let's buy it, or oh, I hate it, it'll be fabulous'".

=== Filming ===
Principal photography took place over a two-month period from mid-March to May 2008 in Miami. Dostana's art director was Amrita Mahal. Mahal assisted Sharmishta Roy for four years, worked with her on Kabhi Alvida Naa Kehna and became friends with Tarun Mansukhani. When Mansukhani asked her to work on his directorial debut, she jumped at the opportunity. Three large sets were created for the film in Miami: the apartment, the Verve office and the "Desi Girl" set. Smaller sets had simple floor plans. The types of houses in Miami were researched, and Mahal described them as "large and spacious compared to cramped apartments in New York."

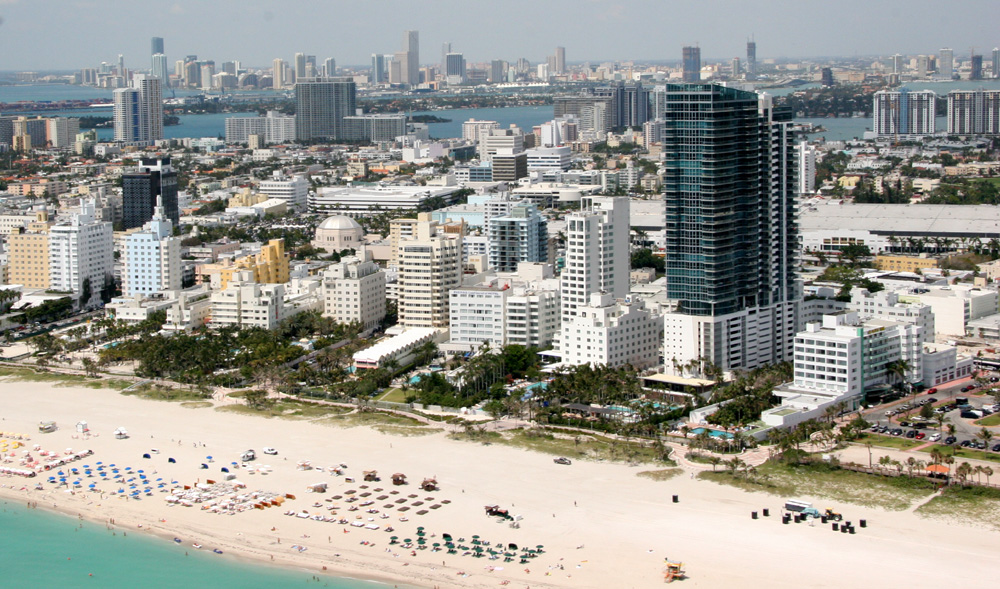
Dostana was filmed almost entirely in Miami.

A three-bedroom apartment with an outdoor pool was created, and the bedrooms were designed to suit their occupants. After toying with colours for the Verve office, Mahal decided to make it black and used four colours for the apartment. Her team gave the furniture a Victorian look; Mahal was pleased with the chandeliers, which she considered lavish for an office. Construction of the "Desi Girl" set, the last to be built, was stressful because of its light-generated heat. Over 100 sketches were drawn to reach the final version, which used plaster of Paris, moulding fibre and wood. A dance floor was surrounded by tables and chairs for a stage-like appearance.

Ayananka Bose was the film's cinematographer. According to Bose, its location was the big factor in his work: "Dostana is based in Miami and to me, Miami means sunshine and beaches. That is what stayed in my mind." Bose chose a bright frame because the film was a comedy about friendship, and the bright frame conveyed vibrancy: "That is what automatically gave Dostana its expression." He found the office set challenging, since there was nowhere to put lights and the room had glass on one side and a wall on the other. However, Bose enjoyed filming on the apartment and office sets.

"Desi Girl" was choreographed by Farah Khan, and Vaibhavi Merchant choreographed the other songs. The item number "Shut Up & Bounce" was shot in Miami in early April 2008; "Desi Girl", with the three lead actors, was filmed in September. Filming ended with a music video, a remix of "Maa Da Laadla", which appears in the closing credits. The video was shot in mid-October 2008 at Filmistan studio in Mumbai, where the lead actors filmed their scenes separately.

== Soundtrack ==
Dostana's soundtrack was composed by the duo Vishal–Shekhar. Anvita Dutt Guptan wrote the lyrics for three songs, and Kumaar wrote two songs. In addition to co-composing the soundtrack and providing vocals on four songs, Vishal Dadlani wrote the lyrics for one. The album contains six original songs with vocals by Vishal Dadlani, Shankar Mahadevan, Sunidhi Chauhan, Master Saleem, Shreya Ghoshal, Amanat Ali and Shaan. The soundtrack album was released on 10 October 2008 by Sony Music.

== Marketing and release ==
Stills from Dostana released to the media in late July 2008 were well-received, and the film's first trailer was released in mid-August. The trailer received considerable attention because of the film's gay storyline (a first in mainstream Indian film), which was kept secret during production. Its trailers, music and style attracted advance publicity, aiding the film's marketing.

The producers promoted Dostana in collaboration with Verve, which dedicated its November issue to the film. The issue, with Chopra on its cover, contained 40 pages of interviews with the actress, Mansukhani and Johar, fashion shoots on the sets, clothing by its designers and fashion and beauty articles based on the film. Although Maybelline products were not used for Chopra's make-up, the company promoted Chopra's appearance with behind-the-scenes footage in their television and print advertisements and invited its customers to mirror the actress. The producers collaborated with Facebook, which featured advertisements with each of the three lead actors urging users to form their own group. Pantaloons partnered with the film to showcase its apparel in 43 outlets across India.

=== Home media ===
Distributed by Yash Raj Films, it was released on DVD on 30 December 2009 in all regions in a two-disc pack. The DVDs include bonus content on the making of the film, deleted scenes, the music video (for "Maa Da Laadla", bloopers, "Date with Dostana" (an interview segment presented by Karan Johar), a "Do the Dostana" challenge, a theatrical trailer and advertisements. A VCD version was released at the same time, and a single-disc DVD was also released. The film's Blu-ray version was released on 14 December 2009.

== Reception ==
=== Box office ===
Made on a production and marketing budget of ₹210 million, Dostana was released on 14 November 2008. The film opened well, with over 80-percent occupancy in multiplexes and over 60-percent occupancy in single-screen cinemas. According to Box Office India, the film earned about ₹53 million on its opening day and over ₹173 million in its first weekend at the domestic box office. At the end of its first week, it had earned ₹267 million. In its second week, Dostana continued to do well and was the best-performing film, despite the release of the Salman Khan-Katrina Kaif-starrer Yuvvraaj. The film was considered a hit in its second week. It also performed well in the overseas market, especially in the United Kingdom and the United States. Dostana grossed ₹261 million on the overseas market and over ₹610 million at the domestic box office for a worldwide gross of over ₹871 million. The film, a commercial success, was the seventh-highest-grossing Bollywood film of the year.

=== Critical reception ===
Dostana received positive reviews from critics, who praised its performances, the chemistry between its three leads and its direction, humour, music, visuals, costumes and style.

Review aggregator Rotten Tomatoes gives the film an approval rating of 81% based on 16 reviews, with an average rating of 5.50 out of 10. A review in The Guardian praised Mansukhani's direction and writing, calling it "a straight victory for gay comedy": "India's convoluted attitude to gayness finally has its cinematic manifestation in Dostana, one of the gayest films ever made in any country but in which almost no one is actually gay. It's also a terrific movie – the best and funniest Bollywood film I've seen in a very long time." Describing the film as a "decent-hearted comedy", Rachel Saltz of The New York Times wrote: "Dostana deserves credit. It irreverently normalizes a topic that has been virtually absent from screens in India, and does so using contemporary Bollywood's best not-so-secret weapon: star power." David Chute of LA Weekly called it "a pure star-vehicle, gliding along on charm and timing – exactly the sort of comfort cinema Hollywood now seems incapable of making."

Taran Adarsh of Bollywood Hungama gave the film a 4 out of 5 rating and called it a madcap comedy which dared to "push the envelope in its own way": "Dostana is a winner all the way. In terms of content, it might just prove to be a trendsetter." The Times of India also rated it 4 out of 5: "It introduces the most outrageous scenes in popular Hindi cinema and manages to get away with it because it's all done with an infectious zest and effervescence that keeps the ribs tickling." Pratim D. Gupta of The Telegraph rated the film 7.5 out of 10, writing that Dostana "can make you laugh out loud and also strike an emotional chord." Raam Tarat of Future Movies rated the film 3.5 out of 5, praising its performances ("The lead actors share a great chemistry, are easy on the eye and oh so charming that they, along with beautiful Miami make for a visual treat") and calling it "a great, fun entertainer with lots of charm and great music." For Hindustan Times, film critic Khalid Mohamed gave Dostana a 3.5 out of 5 rating: "Good taste, pop colour Miami locations, high-end costumes, make-up styling and the A-grade Dharma Productions values add up to a zingy entertainer".

Rajeev Masand also gave the film a positive review, calling it "a barrel of non-stop laughs": "It puts the fun back into the movies. You laugh harder than you have in a long time. It's a film with a one-point agenda – to entertain you while you're in your seat. It achieves that, no two ways about it." Sudhish Kamath of The Hindu noted that Dostana "largely reflects a society in transition and begins to address the issues of acceptance within the Indian framework of marriage": "Dostana is great mass entertainment manipulating the inherent homophobia of a country on the threshold of change, but what's significant is that it will bring parents and children together to share laughs over alternative sexuality and related issues that will no longer remain in the closet."

Raja Sen of Rediff.com gave the film a mixed review. Although he found it "genuinely entertaining", he was disappointed with Dostana's treatment of homosexuality. According to Sen, it would set "an already-fragile mindset of Indians" a decade back in its attitudes: "We in India haven't yet matured to sensitive, normalized portrayals of homosexuality, and this film continues to paint them as freaks of nature."

== Awards ==
Award	Date (Note: Linked to the article about the awards held that year, wherever possible.)	Category	Recipient(s) and nominee(s)	Result	Ref(s)
Filmfare Awards	28 February 2009	Best Film	Dostana	Nominated	
Filmfare Awards	28 February 2009	Best Actor	Abhishek Bachchan	Nominated	
Filmfare Awards	28 February 2009	Best Supporting Actress	Kirron Kher	Nominated	
Filmfare Awards	28 February 2009	Best Debut Director	Tarun Mansukhani	Nominated	
Filmfare Awards	28 February 2009	Best Music Director	Vishal–Shekhar	Nominated	
Filmfare Awards	28 February 2009	Best Choreography	Farah Khan (for "Desi Girl")	Nominated	
Filmfare Awards	28 February 2009	Best Cinematography	Ayananka Bose	Nominated	
Filmfare Awards	28 February 2009	Best Costume Design	Manish Malhotra, Aki Narula	Nominated	
Filmfare Awards	28 February 2009	Best Scene of the Year	Dostana	Nominated	
International Indian Film Academy Awards	13 June 2009	Best Film	Dostana	Nominated	
International Indian Film Academy Awards	13 June 2009	Best Actor	Abhishek Bachchan	Nominated	
International Indian Film Academy Awards	13 June 2009	Best Performance in a Comic Role	Abhishek Bachchan	Won	
International Indian Film Academy Awards	13 June 2009	Best Supporting Actress	Kirron Kher	Nominated	
International Indian Film Academy Awards	13 June 2009	Best Music Director	Vishal–Shekhar	Nominated	
International Indian Film Academy Awards	13 June 2009	Best Female Playback Singer	Sunidhi Chauhan (for "Desi Girl")	Nominated	
International Indian Film Academy Awards	13 June 2009	Best Choreography	Farah Khan (for "Desi Girl")	Won	
Producers Guild Film Awards	6 December 2009	Best Actor	Abhishek Bachchan	Nominated	
Producers Guild Film Awards	6 December 2009	Best Actor in a Comic Role	Boman Irani	Nominated	
Producers Guild Film Awards	6 December 2009	Best Costume Design	Manish Malhotra	Nominated	
Producers Guild Film Awards	6 December 2009	Best Choreography	Farah Khan (for "Desi Girl")	Nominated	
Screen Awards	14 January 2009	Best Actor	Abhishek Bachchan	Nominated	
Screen Awards	14 January 2009	Best Actor (Popular Choice)	Abhishek Bachchan	Nominated	
Screen Awards	14 January 2009	Best Actress (Popular Choice)	Priyanka Chopra (Note: Also for her role in Fashion.)	Nominated	
Screen Awards	14 January 2009	Best Debut Director	Tarun Mansukhani	Nominated	
Screen Awards	14 January 2009	Best Music Director	Vishal–Shekhar	Nominated	
Screen Awards	14 January 2009	Best Male Playback Singer	Shankar Mahadevan (for "Desi Girl")	Nominated	
Screen Awards	14 January 2009	Best Choreography	Farah Khan (for "Desi Girl")	Nominated	
Screen Awards	14 January 2009	Best Dialogue	Anvita Dutt Guptan	Nominated	
Screen Awards	14 January 2009	Best Cinematography	Ayananka Bose	Nominated	
Screen Awards	14 January 2009	Jodi No. 1	Abhishek Bachchan & John Abraham	Won	
Stardust Awards	15 February 2009	Best Film	Dostana	Nominated	
Stardust Awards	15 February 2009	Actor of the Year – Male	Abhishek Bachchan	Nominated	
Stardust Awards	15 February 2009	Actor of the Year – Female	Priyanka Chopra	Won	
Stardust Awards	15 February 2009	Hottest New Filmmaker	Tarun Mansukhani	Nominated	
Stardust Awards	15 February 2009	Best Supporting Actor	Bobby Deol	Nominated	
Stardust Awards	15 February 2009	Best Supporting Actress	Kirron Kher	Nominated	
Stardust Awards	15 February 2009	Best Supporting Actress	Sushmita Mukherjee	Nominated	

== Impact ==
=== Homosexuality ===
Dostana was the first mainstream Indian film to explore homosexuality. The film has been credited with shedding light on a topic sensitive with a majority of Indian population, who were unaware of sexual orientations. A Screen article called it a "giant leap for the gay people in Indian films", and the film sparked debate. According to a Bollywood Hungama report, "The fact that it is a mainstream film with two mainstream heroes taking the plunge to the extent of even showing a prolonged smooch and courtship should have the pink brigade cheering."

Indian journalist and LGBT-rights activist Ashok Row Kavi praised Dostana: "I am glad, for the first time in Indian popular cinema, gays were not turned into caricatures and made fun of. What the film has done is to bring to notice gays as a concept in [the] Indian family." Its depiction of a homosexual character's acceptance by his mother was seen as encouraging acceptance of gay people. According to a Daily News and Analysis article, "gay talk" went mainstream in Bollywood with the film: "Films like Dostana are playful and funny [and] bring sexuality as a dinner-table conversation piece. Bollywood is open to diversity in terms of subjects, including sexuality, and the audiences are ready to accept diversified subjects".

About the gay-rights movement, Namita Bhandare of Mint wrote that Dostana "will also shatter more glass ceilings, make homosexuality a little less taboo and bring conversation about gays and sexual orientation out in the open": "Here's a film that is made within the parameters and, therefore, limitations of mainstream cinema. The two lead actors aren't gay; they only pretend to be gay. But despite these limitations, the film brings homosexuality out of the fringe and into the drawing room". Karan Johar said that after Dostana's release, he received thousands of emails from "kids, youngsters [and] teenagers" thanking him for making the film because their parents are now aware of homosexuality. In a 2016 interview, Johar said: "There was once a point when we weren't even aware. People criticized me for stereotyping homosexuality in Dostana. It's ridiculous how unaware people were before. The film, at least, brought the conversation [about] homosexuality into the drawing room of every urban home."

=== Fashion ===
Prior to Dostana's release, its style and fashions received considerable attention. Chopra's golden swimsuit and Abraham's yellow trunks were noticed by the public, the media and fashion critics. The film influenced fashion trends in India, with its stars' costumes becoming popular (particularly Chopra's silver sari in "Desi Girl"). Her sari's popularity encouraged designer Manish Malhotra to carry varieties of it in his store. The actor's looks and style were popular with youngsters and college students. Bachchan's floral shirts also were popular, and Chopra's look was mirrored by the public. Dostana ranks among the most stylish Indian films of all time, and was voted Most Stylish Film by Filmfare in 2013. Bollywood Hungama also ranked it the most stylish Bollywood film of all time.

== Shelved sequel ==
In June 2019, Johar announced a sequel, Dostana 2, to be directed by Collin D'Cunha and produced by Dharma Productions. Kartik Aaryan, Janhvi Kapoor and Lakshya were announced to star as the leads. The film began production on 8 November 2019, but ended up in production hell due to the COVID-19 pandemic. In December 2021, Bollywood Hungama reported that the sequel had been shelved indefinitely.
