= Vishal–Shekhar =

Indian music duo

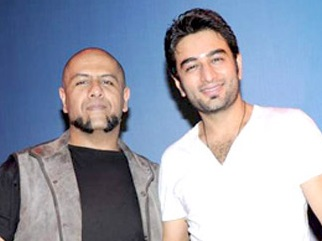
- Vishal Dadlani (left) and Shekhar Ravjiani (right)

Background information
- Origin: Mumbai, Maharashtra, India
- Genres: Electronic dance; pop; hip hop; Sufi; Western classical; rock; trance
- Occupations: Singer-songwriter; musicians; lyricist; actors
- Years active: 1999–present
- Labels: T-Series; YRF Music; Sony Music India; Zee Music Company
- Members: Vishal Dadlani; Shekhar Ravjiani

Vishal–Shekhar are an Indian music composition, production, singing, and songwriting duo consisting of Vishal Dadlani and Shekhar Ravjiani, from Mumbai. Known predominantly for their work as music composers in Hindi cinema, Vishal–Shekhar have also recorded in Telugu, Tamil and Marathi with the likes of Akon, The Vamps, Imogen Heap and Diplo. They have been streamed over 3 billion times on YouTube, have had 72 number-one singles, and have been featured on over 350 film sound tracks.

Their most popular soundtracks include Jhankaar Beats (2003), Dus (2005), Salaam Namaste (2005), Bluffmaster (2005), Om Shanti Om (2007), Tashan (2008), Bachna Ae Haseeno (2008), Dostana (2008), I Hate Luv Storys (2010), Anjaana Anjaani (2010), Tees Maar Khan (2010), Ra.One (2011), The Dirty Picture (2011), Student of the Year (2012), Chennai Express (2013), Gori Tere Pyaar Mein (2013), Hasee Toh Phasee (2014), Bang Bang! (2014), Happy New Year (2014), Sultan (2016), Befikre (2016), Tiger Zinda Hai (2017), Bharat (2019), War (2019) Pathaan (2023), and Fighter. They have also appeared as judges on Indian Idol Junior, The Stage India, MTV Hustle, Sa Re Ga Ma Pa, Voice of India – Mummy Ke Superstars, Indian Idol, and Jo Jeeta Wohi Superstar. They also composed background scores from 1994 to 2012. After a part, Ravvjiani composed background music independently.

== Background ==
Vishal Dadlani is also the vocalist of Mumbai-based electronic band Pentagram. He collaborated with Imogen Heap on the song "Minds Without Fear" for an episode of The Dewarists.

Shekhar Ravjiani is a trained classical singer (under Ustad Niaz Ahmed Khan). He learned to play the accordion from his father, a music enthusiast, Hasmukh Ravjiani. Shekhar was a participant of Zee TV singing contest Sa Re Ga Ma Pa in 1997. He composed and sung Marathi songs "Saazni" in 2012 and "Saavli" (with Sunidhi Chauhan) in 2011.

== Musical film career ==
=== 1999–2002: Beginnings in Bollywood ===
Sujal Maheshwari & Vishal Dadlani, along with his Pentagram teammates Shiraz Bhattacharya and Samrat, made his Bollywood debut by composing tracks for Tyger Productions' film Pyaar Mein Kabhi Kabhi (1999) including the hit songs "Woh Pehli Baar" and "Musu Musu Hasi". Coincidentally, Dadlani's childhood friend Shekhar Ravjiani also composed a few tracks on the same film including "Dil Se Mere Door Na Jana". The two childhood friends met in the studio while recording songs for the film where they decided to form a team together to write music for Bollywood films. They formed the musical duo Vishal-Shekhar.

Their first composition in Bollywood as a duo was as guest composers for Padam Kumar's Champion, where they composed two tracks "Aisa Champion Kahan" and "Lelo Lelo". They would compose one song each as guest composers for Rehnaa Hai Terre Dil Mein (2001) and Mujhe Kucch Kehna Hai (2001). Vishal-Shekhar's first full soundtrack was Vadh (2002).

=== 2003–2007: Breakthrough ===
Vishal-Shekhar first got noticed in Bollywood with Jhankaar Beats (2003), which included hit songs such as "Tu Aashiqui Hai" and "Suno Na". They won the Filmfare RD Burman Award for New Music Talent for Jhankaar Beats. Recognized for introducing techno music in Bollywood, Vishal-Shekhar continued further success after Jhankaar Beats with soundtracks like Supari (2003) and Musafir (2004). "Allah Ke Bande" from Waisa Bhi Hota Hai Part II also became a success during this period. Vishal-Shekhar began receiving offers from bigger banners and 2005 was hugely successful for the duo as they composed the songs for three films: Dus, Salaam Namaste and Bluffmaster. Dus earned them their first nomination for the Filmfare Award for Best Music Director.

The duo would continue to write music for successful soundtracks during this period including Golmaal: Fun Unlimited (2006), I See You (2006), Ta Ra Rum Pum (2007) and Om Shanti Om (2007). Om Shanti Om which had the hit songs "Main Agar Kahoon", "Dard-e-Disco" and "Aankhon Mein Teri" earned the duo their second nomination for the Filmfare Award for Best Music Director. They won the Best Composer Award at the 2nd Asian Film Awards for Om Shanti Om.

=== 2008–present: Mainstream success ===
2008 was the year when Vishal-Shekhar established themselves among the leading music directors in Bollywood with extremely popular soundtracks for Tashan, De Taali, Bachna Ae Haseeno and Dostana. Tashan had the hit song "Falak Tak Chal Saath Mere" while Bachna Ae Haseeno had several hit tracks including "Khuda Jaane" and "Lucky Boy" and Dostana had the evergreen item number "Desi Girl". Dostana earned them their third nomination for the Filmfare Award for Best Music Director.

After only one release with Aladin in 2009, Vishal-Shekhar continued their success in 2010. The year included Anjaana Anjaani which had the hit songs "Tujhe Bhula Diya" and "Aas Paas Khuda" and I Hate Luv Storys which had evergreen successes with "Bin Tere" and "Bahara". Both these films earned them two nominations for the Filmfare Award for Best Music Director at the 56th Filmfare Awards. The same year also included Tees Maar Khan, which included the hit item number "Sheila Ki Jawani", one of the two most popular Bollywood songs of 2010 along with "Munni Badnaam Hui".

Vishal-Shekhar's success continued with two major soundtracks in 2011 for Ra.One and The Dirty Picture. Ra.One included the hit songs "Dildaara" and "Chammak Challo", which featured internationally renowned singer Akon on vocals while The Dirty Picture had the hit item number "Ooh La La" and "Ishq Sufiana". They earned their sixth nomination for the Filmfare Award for Best Music Director for Ra.One. The following year, Vishal-Shekhar composed music for Karan Johar's Student of the Year (2012), which included hit tracks such as "Ishq Wala Love" and "The Disco Song", earning the duo their seventh nomination for the Filmfare Award for Best Music Director.

Vishal-Shekhar continued their association with Red Chillies Entertainment after Om Shanti Om with successful soundtracks for Chennai Express (2013) and Happy New Year (2014), earning their eighth nomination for the Filmfare Award for Best Music Director for the former.

They continued their success in 2016 with Sultan and Befikre. Sultan had the hit song "Baby Ko Bass Pasand Hai" and "Jag Ghoomeya" while Befikre had the huge hit song "Nashe Si Chad Gayi" which went viral and was the first Indian song to clock 300 million views and then 400 million views on YouTube. It currently has over 600 million views. During the same year, the duo collaborated with British rock band The Vamps for the single "Beliya". Sultan earned them their ninth nomination for the Filmfare Award for Best Music Director.

Vishal–Shekhar's music for Tiger Zinda Hai (2017) was a huge success with "Dil Diyan Gallan" and "Swag Se Swagat", with the latter song becoming the fastest song in the world to hit 100 million views and clocked up to 650 million views on YouTube in its first year.

Vishal-Shekhar have continued their good run with soundtracks for Student of the Year 2 (2019), Bharat (2019) and Pathaan (2023), earning their tenth nomination for the Filmfare Award for Best Music Director for Bharat.

== Awards and nominations ==
=== Annual Central European Bollywood Awards ===
Year	Category	Recipient	Result	Ref.
2005	Best Song	"Dus Bahane" (from Dus)	Nominated	
2005	Best Soundtrack	Dus	Nominated	
2007	Best Soundtrack	Om Shanti Om	Won	
2007	Best Song	"Dastaan-E-Om Shanti Om" (from Om Shanti Om)	Won	
2007	Best Song	"Main Agar Kahoon" (from Om Shanti Om)	Nominated	
2008	Best Soundtrack	Dostana	Nominated	
2008	Best Soundtrack	Bachna Ae Haseeno	Nominated	
2008	Best Song	"Khuda Jaane Om" (from Bachna Ae Haseeno)	Nominated	
2010	Best Song	"Wallah Re Wallah" (from Tees Maar Khan)	Nominated	
2011	Best Soundtrack	Ra.One	Won	

=== Apsara Film and Television Producers Guild Award ===
Year	Category	Recipient	Result	Ref.
2008	Best Music Director	Om Shanti Om	Nominated	
2011	Best Music Director	I Hate Luv Storys	Nominated	
2014	Best Music Director	Chennai Express	Nominated	

=== Asian Film Awards ===
Year	Category	Recipient	Result	Ref.
2008	Best Composer	Om Shanti Om	Won	

=== BIG Star Entertainment Awards ===
Year	Category	Recipient	Result	Ref.
2010	Most Entertaining Music	Anjaana Anjaani	Nominated	
2010	Most Entertaining Song	"Sheila Ki Jawani" (from Tees Maar Khan)	Nominated	
2011	Most Entertaining Song	"Chammak Challo" (from Ra.One)	Nominated	
2011	Most Entertaining Music	The Dirty Picture	Nominated	
2012	Most Entertaining Song	"Radha" (from Student of the Year)	Nominated	
2012	Most Entertaining Music	The Dirty Picture	Nominated	
2013	Most Entertaining Music	Chennai Express	Nominated	

=== Filmfare Awards ===
Year	Category	Recipient	Result	Ref.
2004	R. D. Burman Award for New Music Talent	Jhankaar Beats	Won	
2006	Best Music Director	Dus	Nominated	
2008	Best Music Director	Om Shanti Om	Nominated	
2009	Best Music Director	Dostana	Nominated	
2011	Best Music Director	Anjaana Anjaani	Nominated	
2011	Best Music Director	I Hate Luv Storys	Nominated	
2012	Best Music Director	Ra.One	Nominated	
2013	Best Music Director	Student of the Year	Nominated	
2014	Best Music Director	Chennai Express	Nominated	
2017	Best Music Director	Sultan	Nominated	
2020	Best Music Director	Bharat	Nominated	
2024	Best Music Director	Pathaan	Nominated	

=== Global Indian Music Academy Awards ===
Year	Category	Recipient	Result	Ref.
2011	Best Film Song	"Sheila Ki Jawani" (from Tees Maar Khan)	Nominated	
2011	Best Film Album	Anjaana Anjaani	Nominated	
2011	Best Film Album	Tees Maar Khan	Nominated	
2011	Best Music Director	Anjaana Anjaani	Nominated	
2012	Best Music Director	Ra.One	Nominated	
2012	Best Film Song	"Chammak Challo" (from Ra.One)	Won	
2012	Best Film Album	The Dirty Picture	Nominated	
2012	Best Film Album	Ra.One	Nominated	
2013	Best Film Album	Student of the Year	Nominated	
2013	Best Film Song	"Radha" (from Student of the Year)	Nominated	
2013	Best Music Director	Student of the Year	Nominated	

=== International Indian Film Academy Awards ===
Year	Category	Recipient	Result	Ref.
2004	Best Music Director	Jhankaar Beats	Nominated	
2006	Best Music Director	Bluffmaster!	Nominated	
2006	Best Music Director	Dus	Nominated	
2009	Best Music Director	Dostana	Nominated	
2011	Best Music Director	I Hate Luv Storys	Nominated	
2012	Best Music Director	Ra.One	Nominated	
2012	Best Song Recording	"Chammak Challo" (from Ra.One)	Won	

=== Mirchi Music Awards ===
Year	Category	Recipient	Result	Ref.
2010	Listeners' Choice Song of the Year	"Sheila Ki Jawani" (from Tees Maar Khan)	Won	
2010	Album of The Year	Break Ke Baad	Nominated	
2011	Best Item Song of the Year	"Ooh La La" (from The Dirty Picture)	Won	
2011	Album of The Year	Ra.One	Nominated	
2011	Album of The Year	The Dirty Picture	Nominated	
2011	Music Composer of The Year	"Ooh La La" (from The Dirty Picture)	Nominated	
2012	Listeners' Choice Song of the Year	"Radha" (from Student of the Year)	Won	
2012	Listeners' Choice Album of the Year	Student of the Year	Won	
2012	Song of The Year	"Radha" (from Student of the Year)	Nominated	
2012	Album of The Year	Student of the Year	Nominated	
2014	Music Composer of The Year	"Manwa Laage" (from Happy New Year)	Nominated	
2016	Music Composer of The Year	"Jag Ghoomeya" (from Sultan)	Nominated	
2016	Album of The Year	Sultan	Nominated	
2017	Album of The Year	Tiger Zinda Hai	Nominated	
2024	Music Composer of The Year	"Besharam Rang" (from Pathaan)	Won	
