= Niranjan Iyengar =

Indian screenwriter

- Born: Mumbai, Maharashtra, India
- Occupations: Screenwriter, Lyricist
- Writing career
- Genre: Bollywood

Niranjan Iyengar born in Dombivali, Maharashtra, India, is a screenwriter and lyricist particularly known for his work with director Karan Johar. He is also author of the book, The Making of Kabhi Khushi Kabhie Gham.... He also hosts the talk show Look Who's Talking with Niranjan, which is aired on Zee Café.

== Selected filmography ==
Year	Movie	Dialogues	Lyrics	Notes
2003	Jism	Yes		
2003	Paap	Yes		
2003	Rog	Yes		
2003	Kal Ho Naa Ho	Yes		Nominated – Filmfare Award for Best Dialogue
2006	Kabhi Alvida Naa Kehna	Yes		Nominated – Filmfare Award for Best Dialogue
2006	I See You	Yes		
2006	Kya Love Story Hai	Yes		
2008	Kidnap	Yes		
2008	Fashion	Yes		
2009	Life Partner	Yes		
2009	Wake Up Sid	Yes		
2009	Kurbaan	Yes	Yes	
2010	We are Family	Yes		
2010	My Name Is Khan	Yes	Yes	Nominated – Filmfare Award for Best Lyricist ("Noor-e-Khuda") Nominated – Filmfare Award for Best Lyricist ("Sajda")
2012	Ra.One		Yes	Lyrics for the song "Chammak Challo", with Vishal Dadlani
2012	Heroine	Yes	No	
2012	Student of the Year	Yes	No	
2013	D-Day	Yes	Yes	
2014	Heartless	Yes	No	
2016	Ae Dil Hai Mushkil	Yes	No	
2020	Devi			Producer
2020	Haathi Mere Saathi	Yes	No	
TBA	Maharagni: Queen of Queens	Yes	No	

== Awards and nominations ==
Filmfare Awards

- Nominated: Best Dialogue – Kal Ho Naa Ho (2003)
- Nominated: Best Dialogue – Kabhi Alvida Naa Kehna (2006)
- Nominated: Best Lyricist – "Noor-e-Khuda" from My Name Is Khan (2010)
- Nominated: Best Lyricist – "Sajda" from My Name Is Khan (2010)

Screen Awards

- Nominated: Best Dialogue – Kal Ho Naa Ho (2003)
- Nominated: Best Dialogue – Kabhi Alvida Naa Kehna (2006)

Zee Cine Awards

- Nominated: Best Dialogue – Kal Ho Naa Ho (2003)
- Nominated: Best Dialogue – Kabhi Alvida Naa Kehna (2006)

Mirchi Music Awards

- Nominated: Album of The Year – My Name is Khan (2010)
- Nominated: Lyricist of The Year – "Sajda" from My Name is Khan (2010)
- Nominated: Lyricist of The Year – "Tere Naina" from My Name is Khan (2010)
