= Ra.One =

2011 Indian film by Anubhav Sinha

- Theatrical release poster
- Directed by: Anubhav Sinha
- Screenplay by: Anubhav Sinha; Kanika Dhillon; Mushtaq Shiekh; David Benullo
- Dialogues by: Kanika Dhillon; Niranjan Iyengar
- Story by: Anubhav Sinha
- Produced by: Gauri Khan
- Starring: Shah Rukh Khan; Arjun Rampal; Kareena Kapoor; Armaan Verma
- Cinematography: Nicola Pecorini; V. Manikandan; Ewan Mulligan
- Visual effects by: Haresh Hingorani; Keitan Yadav
- Edited by: Sanjay Sharma; Martin Walsh
- Music by: Vishal–Shekhar
- Production company: Red Chillies Entertainment
- Distributed by: Eros International
- Release dates: 24 October 2011 (Dubai); 26 October 2011 (India)
- Running time: 156 minutes
- Country: India
- Language: Hindi
- Budget: ₹120–150 crore (Note: The Financial Express reported the budget to be ₹120 crore (US$12 million). India Today stated that the budget was ₹130 crore (US$13 million). While Bollywood Hungama and NDTV said that the budget was ₹150 crore.)
- Box office: ₹207 crore

Ra.One is a 2011 Indian Hindi-language superhero film directed by Anubhav Sinha and produced by Gauri Khan under Red Chillies Entertainment. The film stars Shah Rukh Khan in a dual role and Arjun Rampal as the titular antagonist, with Kareena Kapoor, Armaan Verma, Shahana Goswami, Tom Wu, Dalip Tahil and Satish Shah in supporting roles. The film's title is inspired by Hindu Saga character Ravana. In the film, a video game antagonist escapes into the real world to track down the player who almost defeated him. The son of the game's deceased creator brings the game's protagonist into the real world to safeguard himself and his mother from the antagonist.

Principal photography began in March 2010 and took place in India and the United Kingdom and was overseen by an international crew. The post-production involved 3-D conversion and the application of visual effects, the latter being recognised as a technological breakthrough among Indian films. With a budget of ₹150 crore (equivalent to ₹309 crore or US$32 million in 2023), inclusive of publicity costs, Ra.One was the most expensive Indian film at the time of release, surpassing the ₹132 crore (equivalent to ₹296 crore or US$31 million in 2023) budget of Enthiran (2010). The producers spent ₹150 crore (equivalent to ₹309 crore or US$32 million in 2023), including a ₹52 crore (equivalent to ₹107 crore or US$11 million in 2023) marketing budget, which involved a nine-month publicity campaign, brand tie-ups, merchandise, video games and viral marketing. The film faced controversies involving plagiarism, content leaks and copyright challenges.

Ra.One was theatrically released on 24 October 2011, the beginning of the five-day Diwali weekend, in 2D, 3D and dubbed versions in Tamil and Telugu languages with three international premieres being held between 24 October 2011 and 26 October 2011. The film witnessed the largest international theatrical release for an Indian film as of 2011 and was preceded by high audience and commercial expectations. Upon release, Ra.One earned praise for the visual effects, action sequences, direction, music and the performances of Khan and Rampal, but criticism for the script. The film became the third-highest-grossing Indian Hindi language film of 2011 domestically, the second highest-grossing Hindi film of 2011 worldwide, and broke a number of opening box office records. It is also one of the highest grossing Indian superhero films. The film also earned more than ₹207 crore (US$21 million) worldwide against a budget of ₹150 crore (US$16 million), and was a commercial success. It subsequently won a number of awards for its technical aspects, notably one National Film Award, one Filmfare Award and four International Indian Film Academy Awards. While initially mixed around its time of release, the film's reception has improved over the years, thus establishing it as a cult film.

== Plot ==
In London, Jenny Nayar, an employee of UK-based company Barron Industries, introduces a new technology that allows things from the digital world to enter the real world using wireless transmissions from multiple devices. Shekhar Subramaniam, who also works for the company, is given a final chance to devise a unique video game. To impress his skeptical son Prateek and upon the request of his wife Sonia, Shekhar uses his son's idea that the antagonist should be more powerful than the protagonist.

Shekhar's colleague Akashi does the motion capture of the game's characters, Jenny does the programming, and Shekhar gives his face to the game's protagonist, G.One, while the antagonist, Ra.One, is faceless and has substantially greater powers than those granted to G.One, including shapeshifting and mind reading, and is imbibed with a self-learning AI. The two characters are given a H.A.R.T, which gives them powers, but also without which they cannot be killed. The game has three levels, and either of the players can only be killed in the third level using a special gun that holds a single bullet, which destroys the opponent's H.A.R.T. While designing the game, Akashi notices some malfunctions but ignores them. When the game is finally launched, it receives a standing ovation, and Prateek is so impressed that he insists on playing it immediately.

Prateek logs in under his favourite alias Lucifer and proceeds to the final level but is interrupted by Akashi. The self-aware Ra.One, being unable to end its turn with Lucifer, becomes determined that Lucifer shall die. When the mainframe fails to shut down, Akashi calls Shekhar, who notices a problem with the game. Ra.One uses the new technology to enter the real world, breaks free and goes to find Lucifer. Ra.One first assumes Akashi's form and asks him about Lucifer. When Akashi fails to reply, Ra.One murders him. After finding the dead Akashi, Shekhar rushes home, but is confronted on the way by Ra.One. In an attempt to save Prateek, Shekhar claims that he is Lucifer, but Ra.One scans Shekhar's ID and kills him after discovering that he is lying.

Prateek notices the strange circumstances of his father's death and realizes that Ra.One has come to life. Prateek and Jenny attempt to bring G.One to life. Meanwhile, Sonia tells Prateek that the family will return to India. Having taken the form of Akashi, Ra.One chases them, but G.One enters the real world through Jenny's computer and after a fight with Ra.One, causes a gas explosion, which breaks Ra.One into cubes and temporarily disables it. G.One takes Ra.One's H.A.R.T., without which Ra.One is weakened but also cannot die. Prateek sees Shekhar in G.One and Sonia realizes she cannot leave G.One behind. They then travel to India through Shekhar's passport. Over time, Prateek becomes close to G.One.

G.One promises Sonia that it will protect Prateek from all harm. Ra.One returns to life takes the form of a billboard model and tracks G.One and Prateek by infiltrating Baron's office.

During a friend's wedding reception, Ra.One hypnotizes Sonia, assumes her form and kidnaps Prateek. Ra.One then instructs G.One to give him its H.A.R.T. back, revealing that it has sent the real Sonia to crash the Mumbai Suburban Railway train into the Chhatrapati Shivaji Terminus. G.One saves Sonia just in the nick of time despite the train crashing and the station premises getting destroyed. After a brief moment with Sonia, it returns to save Prateek. The game resumes with Prateek controlling G.One's moves. Following a lengthy fight, they successfully beat the first and second levels and reach the third level. With little power left, G.One and Prateek trick Ra.One into shooting G.One without its real H.A.R.T. attached.

Ra.One, angered, multiplies itself into ten apparitions after taunting Prateek over his idea of having an antagonist who couldn't die. Prateek is unable to differentiate the real Ra.One, and remembering Shekhar, asks G.One to recover hints. G.One responds with a quote he gave Prateek in his last few days: "If you join the forces of evil, its shadows shall always follow you." The pair then realize that only one of the ten Ra.One apparitions has a shadow. G.One then shoots the shadowed apparition in the H.A.R.T and destroys it. To shield Prateek, G.One absorbs Ra.One's remains from the explosion that followed after Ra.One's destruction, and finally disintegrates to return Ra.One to the realm of the digital world, leaving Prateek heartbroken. Several months later, Prateek and Sonia return to London, where Prateek finally manages to restore G.One's H.A.R.T and bring it back to the real world.

== Cast ==
- Shahrukh Khan in a dual role as
  - Shekhar Subramaniam, a game designer
  - G.One, the protagonist of Ra.One game
- Arjun Rampal as Ra.One (penultimate form and the main antagonist of the game)
- Kareena Kapoor as Sonia Subramaniam / Ra.One (disguised)
- Armaan Verma as Prateek Subramaniam / Lucifer
  - Khan appears as Lucifer in the opening sequence, later revealed to be Prateek's daydream
- Shahana Goswami as Jenny Nayar
- Tom Wu as Akashi / Ra.One (disguised)
- Dalip Tahil as Barron
- Satish Shah as Iyer
- Nishi Singh as Iyer's wife
- Suresh Menon as the taxi driver
- Delnaaz Irani as the school teacher aboard the hijacked train
- Elisha Kriis as Party Girl
- Joe Egan as The Daddy
- Shola Adewusi as Airport Cop
- Ben Hawkey as Billy
- Mike Parish as Australia Tourist
- Georgia Curtis as Backing Dancer
- Ravi Pandey as Lord Rama in a divine attire at Dussehra festival

Cameo Appearances

- Amitabh Bachchan as the narrator for Ra.One game (voice-over)
- Rajnikanth as Chitti The Robot; the character appears as a computer-generated likeness due to the actor's unavailability
- Sanjay Dutt as Khalnayak
- Priyanka Chopra as Desi Girl, Khalnayak's captive and Lucifer's girlfriend
- Ninad Kamat as game instructor (voice-over)

== Production ==
=== Development ===
"Ra.One is the modern, new age technology version of our mythological "Raavan", who was a mixture of ten different evil characters. I am essaying the role of G.One or better say "Jeevan", a superhero who saves the mankind from Ra.One's torment. Through this film, I want to prove that Indian superheroes can also be as cool as the international ones."

— Shahrukh Khan on Ra.One

According to director Anubhav Sinha, the idea of Ra.One originated in 2005 when he saw an advertisement on television which showed children remotely controlling a human. He was attracted to the concept and wrote a script based on it. Sinha then approached Shah Rukh Khan, who liked the story and decided to produce the film under his production company Red Chillies Entertainment. Sinha wasn't sure about retaining Khan's support after the former's previous film Cash (2007) became a commercial failure, but Khan reportedly "remained unchanged".

Khan felt that the film possessed significant commercial potential in addition to being a fulfilment of his "childhood dream" to be a superhero and to fly. He stated that he wanted to "make a film that gives me the right to deserve the iconic status that I've got for 20 years", and also said that he wanted to make a film dedicated to father-son relationships, which were, in his opinion, "neglected" in Bollywood. Khan's idea was to make a simple family drama which expanded into an action film. He declined to make the film in English to increase its appeal for Western audiences, feeling that "cracking Hollywood on their terms" was unnecessary. Both Khan and Sinha credited their children for providing encouragement and regularly "approving" the film's execution.

Red Chillies Entertainment continued to work on other projects before finalising the production aspects of Ra.One. After providing the visual effects for My Name Is Khan (2010), the studio focused solely on Ra.One and did not take up any other films. Khan initially approached a number of directors to helm the film, including Aditya Chopra and Karan Johar, but they declined; eventually, Sinha was made as the film's director. To prepare the film's premises and characterisation, Sinha spent several months viewing video clips, digital art portals and comic books. Sinha and Khan also watched around 200 superhero films from all over the world. The storyboards were designed by Atul Chouthmal, who was contracted after he met Khan at Yash Raj Studios. While the former began work on the storyboards, the producers hired a storyboard artist from Hollywood. Chouthmal revealed that Khan and the other artist differed on their visions of the film, and so he was brought back. Before filming, Khan reportedly took tips from actor Kamal Haasan regarding the production of large-scale films, having been impressed by Haasan's Dasavathaaram (2008).

"I have always felt this – and even Alfred Hitchcock said that in a movie, which has a larger than life hero, the villain's role should be very strong. So, I [also] felt [that] if the villain looks good, the superhero will also look good."

— Shahrukh Khan, on the title of the film

The title of the film received significant media attention due to it being the name of the antagonist rather than the protagonist. The move was considered innovative and noted as a sign of the "rising importance of the villain in Bollywood." According to Sinha, the title had not been planned as such, and was ultimately chosen because Ra.One "sounded cooler" than G.One. Khan was advised to name the film after his own character; he declined to do so, citing the inter-dependence between good and evil. He also called Alfred Hitchcock as his inspiration, and pointed out that the antagonists in films like Sholay, Mr. India and Sadak were better remembered than the protagonists.

=== Casting ===
Shah Rukh Khan was the first actor to be cast in the film. Kareena Kapoor, Priyanka Chopra and Asin had initially been considered for the lead female role; Kareena Kapoor was ultimately chosen because she insisted on playing the part. Arjun Rampal accepted the role of Ra.One after Anubhav Sinha expressed a strong desire to cast him in the film. Tom Wu was contracted to the film in July 2010 and Shahana Goswami was cast one month later. Amitabh Bachchan agreed to be a part of the film after being requested by Khan and Sinha. Several cast members prepared extensively for their roles; Rampal and Kapoor followed special diets to lose weight, Khan and Verma performed their own stunts and Kapoor subsequently did so as well despite initial reluctance.

The cast encountered problems during production, Khan faced difficulties with his superhero suit and prosthetic makeup and injured his left knee. The decision to cast Rampal was met with scepticism due to "questionable acting abilities", a statement Sinha criticised. In addition, Rampal encountered back problems (which were treated by the time production began), prompting speculation of a possible replacement by Vivek Oberoi. Jackie Chan had initially been approached for the role of Aakaashi, but he declined the offer. Rajinikanth suffered from health problems which caused a delay in the filming of his cameo appearance. Sanjay Dutt faced a scheduling conflict with Agneepath (2012), which was later resolved.

=== Filming ===
The crew of Ra.One featured both Indian and overseas personnel. Nicola Pecorini served as the director of photography with V. Manikandan providing assistance. Andy Gill and Spiro Razatos were hired as the stunt supervisors, and Nino Pansini was hired as the stunt cinematographer. Sabu Cyril and Marcus Wookey were responsible for the production design. The film's producer was Bobby Chawla, but Gauri Khan later stepped in after the former suffered a brain haemorrhage. Filming took place at a number of studios, notably Filmistan Studios, Film City and Yash Raj Studios in India and the Black Hangar Studios in the UK.

Principal photography was initially set to begin in Miami, but the idea was abandoned due to budget constraints. The first phase of filming began in Goa on 21 March 2010 and continued until May. The second and third phases took place in London with the entire cast, beginning in July 2010 and ending in August. The next phase was split into two schedules; the first schedule commenced at Filmistan Studios in the first week of September 2010, while the second schedule began in December 2010 and took place over a seven-day period. The remaining portions were filmed in July 2011 at Film City. A cameo appearance and a music video were filmed in the weeks leading up to the release, the former at the Whistling Woods Studios in Mumbai.

Ra.One featured three major action sequences, which were filmed in sets and real locations across Mumbai and London. The cinematography borrowed ideas from video games, such as rapid transitions between first-person and third-person perspectives. Procedures such as bullet time were also incorporated into the film. The production design was closely associated with the lighting and cinematography to facilitate smooth filming. However, filming faced a number of difficulties including increasing costs, delays and safety constraints. In addition, differences between Khan and Sinha caused tensions on the sets.

=== Post-production ===
As with the filming crew, the post-production crew of the film included both Indian and overseas personnel. Prime Focus carried out the film's 3-D conversion with London-based colorist Richard Fearon performing the colour grading. Red Chillies VFX partnered with a number of visual effects studios around the world and undertook the incorporation of the visual effects under the supervision of Jeffrey Kleiser. Nvidia provided the information technology–based software utilised for the effects, while Edwark Quirk supervised over the computer-generated imagery used in the film. Resul Pookutty was responsible for the film's sound design.

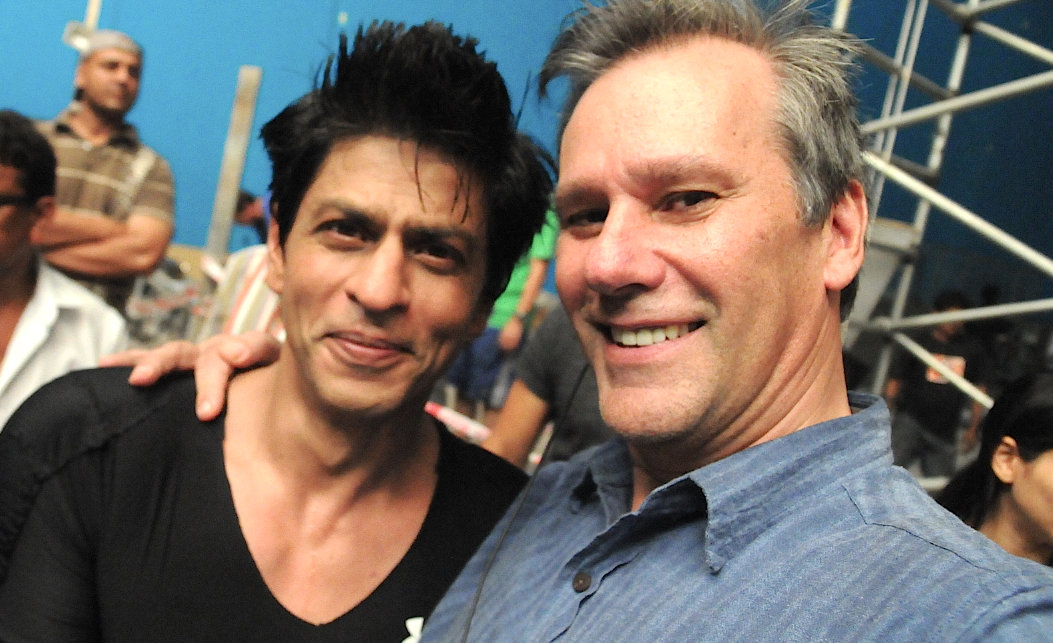
Kleiser (right) and Shahrukh Khan on the sets of Ra.One

The idea for converting the film to 3-D was put forth during filming, and was implemented in July 2011 due to a revived interest in 3-D films. The process required 2,600 artists to convert 4,400 shots of the film. The sound design involved bridging the real and the virtual world, and the required sound enhancements were achieved by using the Dolby Surround 7.1 system. Incorporating the visual effects began in April 2010, and was preceded by extensive research. 1,200 artists worked for 2 1/2 years to complete the visual effects work. A number of complex procedures were executed, including cubical transformations and the design of the faceless form of Ra.One.

Despite precautions, the post-production faced significant delays owing to the digital inter-mediation, increased work-load due to the 3-D and dubbed versions of the film, and delays in the completion of the visual effects. The post-production also faced budget constraints and witnessed an overuse of CGI according to the cinematographer. The delays left only two days for printing the film and sending it to theatres, generating significant anxiety over a possible delay in the release. Khan subsequently kept strict tabs on the progress of work and postponed his knee surgery to complete the film on time.

=== Costumes ===
G.One's costume prior to the addition of visual effects

The bodysuits worn by Khan and Rampal were designed by Robert Kurtzman and Tim Flattery, and made by a team of specialists based in Los Angeles. Sinha spent around three months conceptualising the costumes, watching various superhero films to design a costume, which is not created already. He then wrote a 23-page document with his sketches and details of what he wanted and gave it to the designers to work upon. To create the suit, Khan was required to enter a small chamber where a warm latex-like liquid was released up to his neck and allowed to solidify, forming the mould which was then peeled off his body. The suit was joined by a concealed zipper and subsequently modified. Computer-generated embellishments such as light beams and electricity were added to the suits after Khan expressed dissatisfaction with the initial rushes of the film. A total of 21 costumes were made for the film, with each suit reportedly costing ₹10 million (US$100,000).

Khan's suit was made of reinforced latex, coloured steel-blue and fitted with micro-computer circuitry. Rampal's suit was made of three-inch thick solid rubber, and was red in colour. Both actors were required to wear additional suits inside their body suits to prevent skin contact. Wearing the suits created a number of difficulties for the actors. It took 20 minutes to put on the suits and 40 minutes to remove them. In addition, the non-porous nature of the suits created intense heat inside, causing excessive perspiration despite the presence of special air conditioning ducts. Khan later felt that the suits' conception had been a mistake since filming occurred during the day; digital adjustments to the suits brought "all the efforts to naught".

Manish Malhotra designed the look and the costume of Kareena Kapoor for the song "Chammak Challo", which received widespread media coverage. Kapoor wore a red sari draped in the style of a dhoti. Since the release of the song, the costume was termed a "fashion rage", becoming popular in India and some overseas countries. Fashion experts applauded the costume and Kapoor's ability to carry it off "stunningly", though certain experts dismissed the naming of the sari colour.

== Music ==
The soundtrack and background score of Ra.One was composed by Vishal–Shekhar, with the lyrics being written by Panchhi Jalonvi, Vishal Dadlani and Kumaar. A. R. Rahman provided the background score for a single sequence. Sinha announced that R&B singer Akon and the Prague Philharmonic Orchestra would be a part of the soundtrack; the former lent his vocals for "Chammak Challo" and "Criminal", while the latter performed in "Bhare Naina". The composers obtained the official license to sample Ben E. King's "Stand By Me", on which they based the song "Dildaara". The soundtrack contains fifteen tracks, including seven original songs, four remixes, three instrumentals and an international version of "Chammak Challo". The music rights were bought by T-Series for ₹150 million (US$1.6 million). The Hindi version of the soundtrack was released on 21 September 2011; the Tamil version was released on 5 October 2011 and Telugu version was released on 9 October 2011 respectively, featuring six tracks each.

== Marketing ==
=== Promotion ===
Ra.One's poster featuring Arjun Rampal. This look was kept in secrecy throughout the production of the film until release.

The producers of Ra.One spent ₹100 million (US$1.0 million) out of a ₹520 million (US$5.4 million) marketing budget, ₹150 million (US$1.6 million) of this was utilised for internet promotions alone. The film's first theatrical poster was released in December 2010, and was followed by the release of two teaser trailers during the 2011 ICC Cricket World Cup. The first theatrical trailer premiered three months later. Khan and Sinha undertook a multi-city tour during which they unveiled a 3,600 feet-long piece of fan mail to collect audience messages. The official website of Ra.One was launched on 31 May 2011, and an official YouTube channel for the film was subsequently unveiled. On 20 October 2011, Khan held a live chat with fans on Google Plus, the first time an Indian film personality had done so. Rampal's look in the film, which had been kept secret, was revealed in late October 2011.

The film's marketing utilised merchandise and games to facilitate the creation of a franchise. Khan marketed merchandise related to the film, which included toys, PC tablets and apparel. On 14 October 2011, a gaming tournament featuring games like Call of Duty was conducted in Mumbai and telecast live on YouTube.

=== Video game ===
Red Chillies Entertainment partnered with Sony Computer Entertainment Europe to create "Ra.One – The Game", a game for PlayStation 2 and PlayStation 3 which was released on 5 October 2011. A PS2/PS3 bundle set were also released.

The producers further collaborated with UTV Indiagames to design a social game titled Ra.One Genesis, with an independent plot based on G.One, in addition to designing digital comics based on the film's characters.

== Release ==
=== Statistics ===
In India, the Hindi version of Ra.One was released across more than 4,000 plus screens worldwide- 3,100 screens in 2,100 theatres, breaking the record for the widest Hindi film's release previously held by Salman Khan's Bodyguard (2011). The Tamil and Telugu versions were released on 275 prints and 125 prints respectively. A week before the release, multiplex owners throughout India decided to allot 95% of the total available screen space to the film. Overseas, Ra.One was released in 904 prints. This including 600 prints in Germany, 344 prints in the US, 200–300 prints in South Korea, 202 prints in the UK, 79 prints in the Middle East, 75 prints in Russia, 51 prints in Australia, 49 prints in Canada and 25 prints in New Zealand and Taiwan. In early October 2011, a partnership deal was being finalised by the distributors to allow the film to be released in China across 1,000 prints. In addition, the film was released in Pakistan and non-traditional territories like Brazil, Spain, Italy, Greece and Hong Kong. The 3D version was released in 550 screens across the world. Ra.One was noted for the extensive use of digital prints, reportedly making up 50–60% of the total release; in India, the film was exhibited in over 1,300 digital theatres, breaking the record previously held by Bodyguard. The wide digital release was implemented to lower distribution costs, make the film accessible to a wider audience and reduce piracy. Despite the measures taken, pirated versions of Ra.One were available on the Internet within hours of the film's release.

=== Screenings ===
In May 2011, the first rushes of Ra.One were shown to the cast of Khan's other home production Always Kabhi Kabhi (2011). Subsequently, the film was screened for test audiences to study and gauge the film's appeal across different age groups. A few days prior to the theatrical release, Khan arranged a special screening of the film's final cut in Yash Raj Studios, where he invited close friends, his family and the film's crew. Between 24 and 26 October 2011, Ra.One had international premieres in Dubai, London and Toronto, all of which were chosen due to their international significance and large South Asian populations. The premiere in Dubai was held on 24 October 2011 at the Grand Cinemas, Wafi. A high-profile dinner and charity auction followed, where Khan raised AED30,000 (approximately US$8,200) to build a workshop for children with special needs. The premiere included three simultaneous screenings of the film, for which tickets were placed on sale for the public. The premiere in London took place at the O_{2} Cineworld the following day, and the premiere in Toronto took place at the TIFF Bell Lightbox on 26 October 2011.

=== Censorship ===
Ra.One was submitted to the Central Board of Film Certification on 14 October 2011 to receive its viewership rating. The Board raised strong objections to the film's action scenes, fearing that they would influence young children to emulate the stunts. The police and the Indian Railways security force had made similar objections to the train-based stunts in the film, claiming that youngsters would "blindly imitate them" and hence put their lives at risk. The film was finally passed with a 'U' certificate without cuts, but under the condition that prominent disclaimers were shown, stating that the stunts were computer-generated and should not be imitated. The British Board of Film Classification rated the film 12A for "moderate fantasy violence". In March 2012, a Mid-Day report alleged that Ra.One had received a favourable rating, pointing out that the producers had violated the rules by meeting the Board officials during the screening.

=== Home media ===
The television broadcasting rights for Ra.One were bought by Star India for a then-record sum of ₹350 million, surpassing 3 Idiots (2009). The Indian television premiere of Ra.One took place on 21 January 2012 on STAR Gold, garnering a 28% market sharefor the channel and a TVR of 6.7. Star India subsequently syndicated the television screening rights to Disney XD, where it premiered on 2 June 2012. In May 2012, International Media Distribution announced that Ra.One would be televised on Comcast and Cox, as a part of the celebrations of the Asian Pacific American Heritage Month. Discovery Channel tied up with Red Chillies Entertainment to produce a one-hour program titled "Revealed: The Making of Ra.One", which aired on the channel on 30 March 2012. The program discussed the making of the film in detail, including the visual effects and the challenges faced while filming.

Eros International released the DVD of Ra.One on 13 December 2011 across all regions in one-disc and two-disc packs complying with the NTSC format. The DVD of the film contained alternate endings. Initially, Khan had wanted to add alternate endings to the theatrical release itself, but later deemed it risky. The DVD version was made interactive as well. VCD and Blu-ray versions of the film were also released.

The German Blu-ray edition was released on 1 June 2012 by Rapid Eye Movies. On 24 July 2013, French distributor Condor released the film as Voltage on 3D Blu-ray. It was released in a SteelBook edition containing the 3D/2D Blu-ray discs and the DVD. The same year, Japanese distributor Maxam released the Blu-ray on 27 September 2013.

== Controversies ==
=== Plagiarism allegations ===
The film faced allegations of plagiarism with similarities to Terminator 2: Judgment Day (1991), the Batman series, Iron Man (2008), The Sorcerer's Apprentice (2010) and Tron: Legacy (2010). Khan denied the allegations, saying, "I got inspired from a lot of superhero movies but the movie is original. In fact, Ra.One will be the first superhero-based movie in the world in which the superhero lives in a family."

A few days before the release, screenwriter Yash Patnaik claimed that Ra.One resembled a concept that he had developed several years before. Patnaik appealed to the Bombay High Court to delay the film's release, until he was given due credit or 10% of the film's overall profit. The court, observing prima facie evidence that there had been copyright violations, asked the filmmakers to deposit ₹10 million (US$100,000) with the court on 21 October 2011 before releasing the film. Patnaik challenged the court's decision and demanded that the producers give him credit and not cash. Sinha later claimed that he alone had developed the film's story.

=== Hacking ===
Ra.One also faced cybertheft and hacking issues. On 3 June 2011, three days after its launch, the official website of the film was hacked by suspected Pakistani cyber criminals who stated that the act was in revenge for a similar attack on a Karachi press club website. The hackers defaced the homepage and left a note threatening the Press Club of India. Despite precautions, the song "Chammak Challo" was leaked several months before the official release of the soundtrack. Khan clarified that the leaked song was a "rough version" of the actual song, and that the person responsible for the leak was being looked for. He subsequently refuted claims that the leak had been engineered as a publicity stunt.

=== South Indian representation ===
The sequence in the film where Shah Rukh Khan's character mixes curd with noodles was not well received by South Indians. His frequent usage of the words “ayyo” (transl. oh god) and “rascal” while attempting to speak Tamil was also perceived as inaccurate while Kareena Kapoor's usage of "condom condom" instead of "konjam konjam" (transl. little little) was perceived as offensive and was not present in the dubbed versions.

== Reception ==
=== Box office ===
Territory	Collections	Reference
India	₹1.14 billion^{**}	
India	Distributor share: ₹636.1 million^{**}	
Overseas (outside India)	$10,950,099 (₹511 million)	
Overseas (outside India)	$10.8 million (excluding Japan)	
Overseas (outside India)	$2,511,689 (United States–Canada)	
Overseas (outside India)	$150,099 (₹7,004,153) (Japan)	
Worldwide	₹2.081 billion ($45 million)	
Worldwide	₹2,073,862,500 (Hindi)^{**} (excluding Japan)	
Worldwide	Symbols	
^{*} For 2011 Hindi film releases only; ^{**} Hindi version only; ^{%} Estimate

In India, Ra.One debuted at the beginning of the five-day Diwali weekend, and subsequently broke the Diwali opening day record. The film then set the records for the biggest single-day net revenue and the biggest three-day opening weekend earned by a Hindi film, breaking the previous records held by Bodyguard.

Subsequently, the film began to suffer significant drops in its collections, with its five-day extended weekend and nine-day extended week coming second to the records of Bodyguard. The film faced an 84 percent drop in collections in its second week and fell a further 90 percent in its third week, the latter primarily due to the release of Rockstar. The dubbed versions showed similar trends. The Tamil and Telugu versions together earned around ₹50 million nett.

In overseas markets, Ra.One earned the highest three-day and five-day opening weekends among the Hindi film releases of 2011; by its second weekend, the film had become the highest-grossing Hindi film of 2011 in overseas markets, but the collections suffered drops throughout. In general, families and children formed the major portion of the film's audience, and the 3D version is regarded as a success.

==== Pre-sale record ====
The budget of Ra.One was the subject of significant speculation prior to its release. A number of estimates placed the budget between ₹1.4 billion (US$15 million) and ₹2.0 billion (US$21 million). It was universally accepted that the film was the most expensive Bollywood film of all time, with certain sources stating that the film was the most expensive Indian film ever. The original budget was revealed to be ₹1.30 billion (US$13 million) after promotional expenses. Khan stated that he had "worked very hard" to finance the film without borrowing money, and reportedly hosted a television show just to finance the film. Ra.One earned ₹1.32 billion (US$14 million) from pre-release revenue sources, setting a new record for Bollywood films.

The extensive marketing campaign greatly increased audience expectations of the film. Ra.One set records for the level of pre-release buzz for an Indian film, and also topped a number of polls gauging the most awaited Bollywood films of the year. Anticipation for the film was equally high among the trade analysts, with some commenting that the film would pass the ₹1 billion (US$10 million) mark in one week and the ₹3 billion (US$31 million) mark in over three weeks. Advance bookings commenced on 20 October 2011 on a limited scale, and expanded later. While initial ticket sales were low, they picked up considerably near the release date. A few days prior to the release, the advance booking was described as "phenomenal", with an overall advance booking rate of 20–25% across the country. A number of advantages of the film's release were pointed out, such as the festive season and higher 3D ticket prices, though there had been doubt regarding the timely release of the 3D version.

=== Critical response ===
Upon release, Ra.One received mixed reviews from critics in India and generally positive reviews overseas. Review aggregator Rotten Tomatoes reported a 61% approval rating, based on 23 reviews with an average rating of 5.41/10. On Metacritic, which assigns a weighted mean from film reviews, Ra.One holds a rating of 60% based on eight reviews, signifying "mixed or average reviews".

"Some of the scenes are surely entertaining but when one goes to watch a SRK film, one hopes to be entertained throughout, and sadly Ra.One fails to do so."

— Zee News review; contrarily, several other reviews praised the film's entertainment value.

Positive reviews described the film as an ambitious initiative and a technological success, with some critics thinking that Ra.One had put Indian films on par with Hollywood. The visual effects received near-universal praise, though dissenting opinions stated that they were "all over the place". The action sequences were also widely praised. Other aspects of the film received more polarising opinions, and one very positive review was criticised for "over-rating" the film. Mixed views were opined regarding the plot's gaming concept, with some critics deeming it "far-fetched" and others lauding the "gaming-style aesthetics". Similarly, some critics called the emotional scenes "fulfilling" while others felt them to be "lacking in connect with the audience". Raja Sen of Rediff.com gave a 1.5 out of 5 star rating explaining that "Ra.One is a subpar superhero film with a mediocre soundtrack and occasionally terrific effects. For those of you looking to compare, it's well below Krrish on the super-pecking order, and far, far below Robot."

The story was negatively received by several critics, with a number of them deeming it to be disappointing and lacking in originality; one critic praised the original idea but criticised its "Bollywoodization". The direction was criticised in a number of reviews, though a few critics praised Sinha's pacing of the film and the execution of the action sequences. Some critics pointed to the presence of scenes which were not child-friendly, despite Ra.One being promoted as a children's film. Particular reviews criticised the lack of character development and the film's "incoherently hackneyed morality". A few critics panned the film as a whole, describing it as a "mess"; one review commented, "It's convenient to say that if you have no expectations from the film, you wouldn't be disappointed."

=== Accolades ===
After its release, Ra.One received numerous nominations and awards in India and abroad, a majority of them for its technical aspects. The film notably won the National Film Award and the Filmfare Award for Best Special Effects, and four International Indian Film Academy Awards. The film also received several business awards for its marketing and distribution.

== Potential sequel ==
"A film like this requires a year-and-a-half of pre-production, so it's impossible for me to give you a time frame. I'm unsure if it'll even get made or if I'll use the technology in some other genre [...] I know it is going to be expensive, but perhaps the next film would be cheaper since I now have the technology."

— Khan, on the possible release of a sequel

Reports of a planned sequel of Ra.One began surfacing prior to the film's release, though the extent of real progress on the sequel is unknown. Both Khan and Sinha admitted to formulating plans for a sequel, though the former noted that it would be "presumptuous" to start the sequel before the first film's release. Khan later refuted the speculations, saying that a sequel was unlikely due to his other commitments. After Ra.One won a National Award, an "overjoyed" Khan said that the film's world could be further explored. He stated that the sequel, if made, would be titled G.One and not Ra.Two, and that he would make it "faster, bigger and better" than Ra.One. Khan was reported to be looking for a script, without a fixed release date. In April 2012, Mushtaq Sheikh said that the pre-production of the sequel had begun. A number of reports stated that Kareena Kapoor would not be a part of the sequel.

Despite Khan's enthusiasm for the idea of a sequel, the film industry expressed mixed opinions regarding it. Filmmaker Rajkumar Gupta commented, "It would be challenging to take forward a story that has not worked earlier." Producer Ramesh Taurani responded negatively to the idea, saying, "It is important for the film to be appreciated so that a sequel can be made." Trade analyst Atul Mohan called the sequel "a bad idea". Conversely, others were supportive of the sequel. Producer Goldie Behl brushed aside arguments about the success of the first film, saying, "If the people think that they can earn some more, then it doesn't matter how big or small the hit was." Director Kunal Kohli also reacted positively, saying, "Certain ideas naturally lend themselves to sequels. So why not use that investment of your time and effort to make a sequel that will take the brand further?"

== See also ==
- List of Indian superhero films
