= List of awards and nominations received by Shahid Kapoor =

Shahid Kapoor awards and nominations
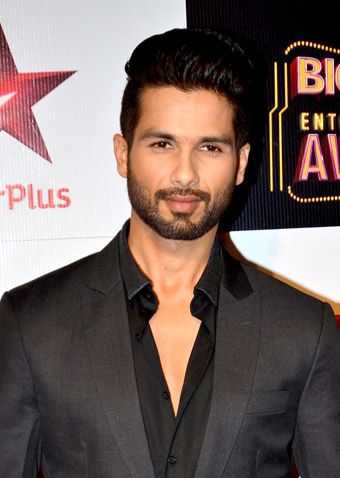
- Kapoor at the Big Star Entertainment Awards 2014
Awards and nominations
Award	Wins	Nominations
BIG Star Entertainment Awards	2	8
Filmfare Awards	3	8
Screen Awards	6	17
Zee Cine Awards	1	6
Stardust Awards	3	8
Star Guild Awards	2	4
IIFA Awards	5	7
Nickelodeon Kids' Choice Awards India	0	1
Indian Film Festival of Melbourne	1	3
Filmfare OTT Awards	0	2
Indian Television Academy Awards	2	2

Totals (Note: Certain award groups do not simply award one winner. They acknowledge several different recipients, have runners-up, and have third place. Since this is a specific recognition and is different from losing an award, runner-up mentions are considered wins in this award tally. For simplification and to avoid errors, each award in this list has been presumed to have had a prior nomination.)
- Wins: 48
- Nominations: 75

Shahid Kapoor is an Indian actor works predominantly in Hindi cinema. Kapoor is the recipient of 48 accolades into his credit respectively. He won three Filmfare Awards — Best Male Debut for Ishq Vishk (2003), Best Actor for Haider (2014) and Best Actor (Critics) for crime drama Udta Punjab (2016), In addition to four Best Actor nominations at Filmfare for Jab We Met (2007), Kaminey (2009), Udta Punjab (2016) and Kabir Singh (2020). For his performance in Haider, Udta Punjab and Kabir Singh, Kapoor was also awarded the Screen Award for Best Actor, IIFA Award for Best Actor and Star Guild Award for Best Actor in a Leading Role among other awards.

Kapoor received critical acclaim for playing a troubled businessman in the romantic comedy Jab We Met (2007), an identical twins in the dark action comedy Kaminey (2009), A young man, with violent insurgency in the crime action Haider (2014), A drug abuser in the crime thriller Udta Punjab (2016), A hostile medical surgeon in the romantic drama Kabir Singh (2019) and a former struggling cricketer in the sports drama Jersey (2022). All of these in which he won and received nominations at numerous awards ceremonies.

== BIG Star Entertainment Awards ==
Year	Nominated work	Category	Result	Ref.
2013	R... Rajkumar	Most Entertaining Actor in an Action Role	Nominated	
2013	Phata Poster Nikhla Hero	Most Entertaining Actor in a Comic Role	Nominated	
2013	"Gandi Baat" – R... Rajkumar	Most Entertaining Dancer	Nominated	
2014	"Bismil" – Haider	Most Entertaining Dancer	Nominated	
2014	Haider	Most Entertaining Actor in a Thriller Film – Male	Won	
2014	Haider	Most Entertaining Film Actor – Male	Won	

== Filmfare Awards ==
Year	Film	Category	Result	Ref.
2004	Ishq Vishk	Best Male Debut	Won	
2008	Jab We Met	Best Actor	Nominated	
2010	Kaminey	Best Actor	Nominated	
2015	Haider	Best Actor	Won	
2017	Udta Punjab	Best Actor (Critics)	Won	
2017	Udta Punjab	Best Actor	Nominated	
2020	Kabir Singh	Best Actor	Nominated	
2023	Jersey	Best Actor (Critics)	Nominated	

== International Indian Film Academy Awards ==
Year	Film	Category	Result	Ref.
2004	Ishq Vishk	Star Debut of the Year – Male	Won	
2004	Ishq Vishk	Sony Face of the Year – Male	Won	
2008	Jab We Met	Best Actor	Nominated	
2010	Kaminey	Best Actor	Nominated	
2015	Haider	Best Actor	Won	
2017	Udta Punjab	Best Actor	Won	
2020	Kabir Singh	Best Actor	Won	

== Indian Television Academy Awards ==
Year	Work	Category	Result	Ref.
2010	Screen Awards	Best Anchor in a Music/Film based show	Won	
2020	Screen Awards	Best Anchor in a Music/Film based show	Won	

== Pinkvilla Screen and Style Icons Awards ==
Year	Film	Category	Result	Ref.
2025	Teri Baaton Mein Aisa Uljha Jiya	Performer of the Year – Male	Won	

== Screen Awards ==
Year	Film	Category	Result	Ref.
2004	Ishq Vishk	Best Male Debut	Won	
2005	Fida	Jodi No. 1 (along with Kareena Kapoor)	Nominated	
2006	Shikhar	Best Actor	Nominated	
2007	Vivah	Best Actor	Nominated	
2007	Vivah	Jodi No. 1 (along with Amrita Rao)	Nominated	
2008	Jab We Met	Best Actor	Nominated	
2008	Jab We Met	Jodi No. 1 (along with Kareena Kapoor)	Nominated	
2010	Kaminey	Jodi No. 1 (along with Priyanka Chopra)	Nominated	
2010	Kaminey	Best Actor (Popular Choice)	Won	
2010	–	Jodi of the Decade (along with Kareena Kapoor)	Nominated	
2011	Badmaash Company	Best Actor	Nominated	
2012	Mausam	Best Actor	Nominated	
2014	R... Rajkumar	Best Actor	Nominated	
2015	Haider	Best Actor	Won	
2015	Haider	Jodi No. 1 (along with Tabu)	Won	
2015	Haider	LifeOK Hero Award	Won	
2018	–	Nothing to Hide Award	Won	
2019	Kabir Singh	Screen Award for Entertainer of the Year	Won	
2020	Kabir Singh	Best Actor	Nominated	

== Stardust Awards ==
Year	Film	Category	Result	Ref.
2004	Ishq Vishk	Superstar of Tomorrow – Male	Won	
2008	Jab We Met	Star of the Year Award – Male	Nominated	
2008	Jab We Met	Best Actor (Editor's Choice)	Won	
2010	Kaminey	Best Actor (Editor's Choice)	Won	
2010	Kaminey	Star of the Year Award – Male	Nominated	
2014	Haider	Star of the Year Award – Male	Nominated	
2014	Haider	Best Actor in a Drama	Won	
2016	Udta Punjab	Best Actor	Nominated	

== Star Guild Awards ==
Year	Film	Category	Result	Ref.
2008	Jab We Met	Best Actor	Nominated	
2010	–	Chevrolet Heartbeat of the Nation (Male)	Won	
2010	Kaminey	Best Actor	Nominated	
2015	Haider	Best Actor	Won	

== Zee Cine Awards ==
Year	Film	Category	Result	Ref.
2004	Ishq Vishq	Best Male Debut	Won	
2008	Jab We Met	Best Actor – Male	Nominated	
2017	Udta Punjab	Best Actor – Male	Nominated	

== Other awards ==
Year	Award / Organisation	Category	Result	Ref.
2009	PETA	Sexiest Male Vegetarian in Asia	Won	
2023	Bollywood Hungama Style Icons	Most Stylish Mould Breaking Star – Male	Nominated	
2025	Bollywood Hungama Style Icons	Most Stylish People's Star of the Year – Male	Won	

== See also ==
- List of accolades received by Haider
- List of accolades received by Kaminey
- List of accolades received by Padmaavat
