= Shahid Kapoor filmography =

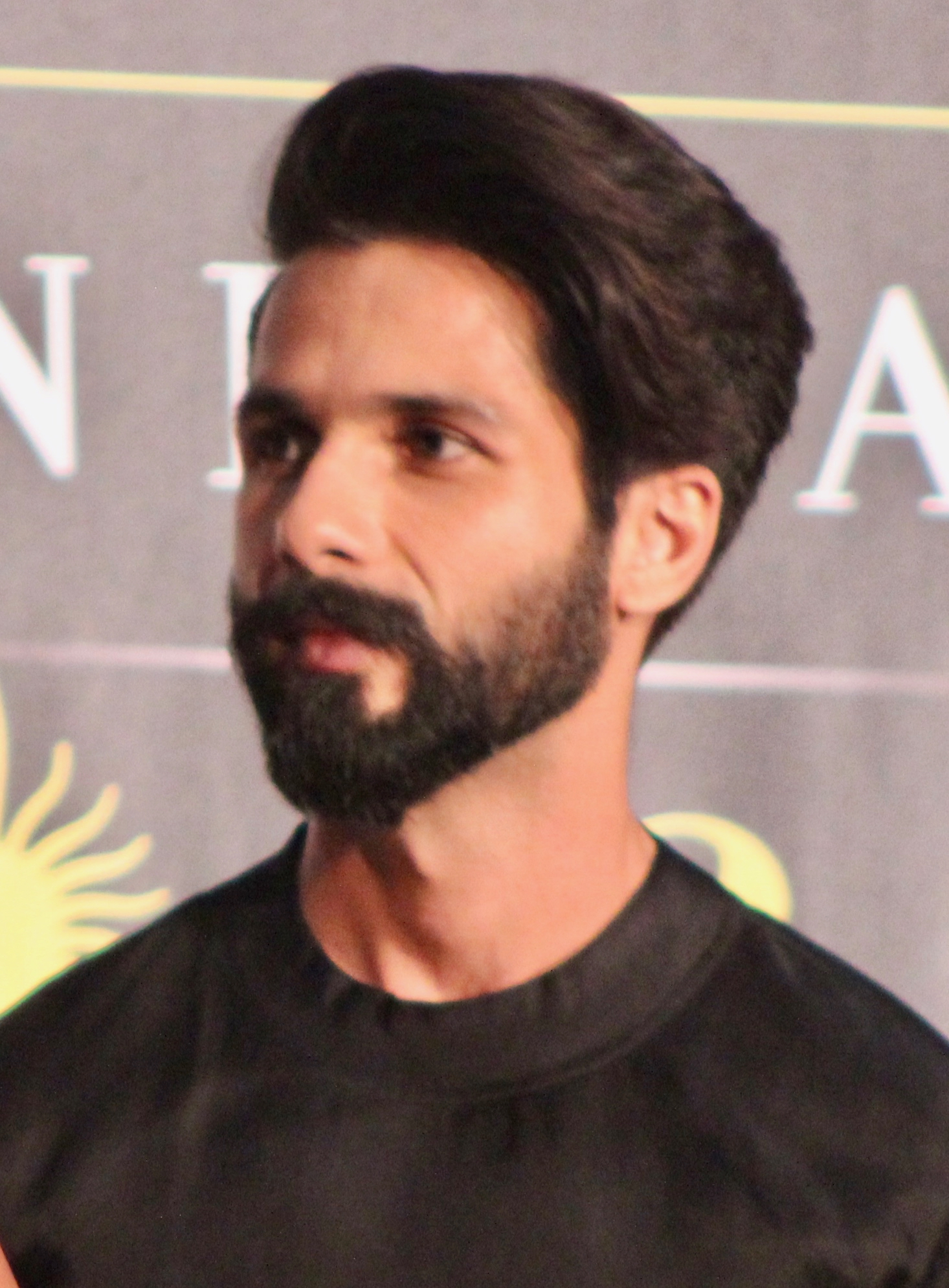
Kapoor at the 2017 IIFA Awards

Indian actor Shahid Kapoor began his career as a background dancer, making uncredited appearances in the films Dil To Pagal Hai (1997) and Taal (1999). He also appeared in several music videos, including one for the singer Kumar Sanu, before making his acting debut with a lead role in Ken Ghosh's romantic comedy Ishq Vishk (2003). The film was a sleeper hit, and Kapoor's portrayal of a teenage student earned him the Filmfare Award for Best Male Debut. He found little success in the next two years; all five of his releases, including the thriller Fida (2004) and the drama Shikhar (2005), were commercial failures.

In 2006, Kapoor starred opposite Kareena Kapoor in 36 China Town and Chup Chup Ke, and played a prospective groom opposite Amrita Rao in Vivah, a commercially successful family drama from director Sooraj Barjatya. In the following year, he reunited with Kareena Kapoor in the romantic comedy Jab We Met, for which he received his first Best Actor nomination at Filmfare. In 2009, Kapoor portrayed twin brothers, one with a lisp and the other with a stutter, in Vishal Bhardwaj's critically acclaimed thriller Kaminey. He then appeared in a series of films which performed poorly at the box-office, including Mausam (2011) and Teri Meri Kahaani (2012). The 2013 action-drama R... Rajkumar proved to be his first commercial success in four years.

In 2014, Kapoor played the title character in Bhardwaj's Haider (2014), an adaptation of William Shakespeare's tragedy Hamlet, winning the Filmfare Award for Best Actor. After serving as a talent judge on the dance reality show Jhalak Dikhhla Jaa Reloaded (2015), he played a rockstar addicted to drugs in Udta Punjab (2016), a crime drama about substance abuse, for which he won the Filmfare Critics Award for Best Actor. Kapoor's highest-grossing release came in 2018 with Sanjay Leela Bhansali's period drama Padmaavat, one of Indian cinema's biggest grossers, in which he portrayed the Rajput ruler Rawal Ratan Singh. The following year, he played the title role of a disgruntled lover in Kabir Singh (2019), which proved to be his biggest commercial success as the sole male lead. After a short hiatus, Kapoor starred in the Amazon Prime Video crime drama series Farzi (2023), which emerged as the most-watched Indian streaming series. He had further commercial success in the romantic comedy Teri Baaton Mein Aisa Uljha Jiya (2024).

== Films ==
Key
†	Denotes films that have not yet been released

Year	Title	Role	Notes	Ref(s)
1997	Dil To Pagal Hai	Dancer	Uncredited	
1999	Taal	Dancer	Uncredited	
2003	Ishq Vishk	Rajiv Mathur		
2004	Fida	Jai Malhotra		
2004	Dil Maange More	Nikhil Mathur		
2005	Deewane Huye Paagal	Karan Sharma		
2005	Vaah! Life Ho Toh Aisi!	Aditya Verma		
2005	Shikhar	Jaidev Vardhan		
2006	36 China Town	Raj Malhotra		
2006	Chup Chup Ke	Jeetu		
2006	Vivah	Prem Bajpayee		
2007	Fool & Final	Raja/Rahul Singhania		
2007	Jab We Met	Aditya Kashyap		
2008	Kismat Konnection	Raj Malhotra		
2009	Kaminey	Charlie and Guddu Sharma (Note: Kapoor played dual roles in the film.)		
2009	Dil Bole Hadippa!	Rohan Singh		
2010	Chance Pe Dance	Sameer Behl		
2010	Paathshaala	Rahul Prakash Udyavar		
2010	Badmaash Company	Karan S. Kapoor		
2010	Milenge Milenge	Amit "Immy" Kapoor		
2011	Mausam	Harinder "Harry" Singh		
2012	Teri Meri Kahaani	Krrish Kapoor, Javed Qadri and Govind (Note: Kapoor played triple roles in the film.)		
2013	Bombay Talkies	Himself	Special appearance in song "Apna Bombay Talkies"	
2013	Phata Poster Nikhla Hero	Vishwas Rao		
2013	R... Rajkumar	Romeo Rajkumar		
2014	Haider	Haider Meer		
2014	Action Jackson	Himself	Special appearance in song "Punjabi Mast"	
2015	Shaandaar	Jagjinder Joginder		
2016	Udta Punjab	Tejinder "Tommy" Singh aka Gabru	25th Film	
2017	Rangoon	Nawab Malik		
2018	Padmaavat	Rawal Ratan Singh		
2018	Welcome to New York	Himself	Special appearance	
2018	Batti Gul Meter Chalu	Sushil Kumar Pant		
2019	Kabir Singh	Dr. Kabir Rajdheer Singh		
2022	Jersey	Arjun Talwar		
2023	Bloody Daddy	Sumair Azad		
2024	Teri Baaton Mein Aisa Uljha Jiya	Aryan Agnihotri		
2025	Deva	ACP Dev Ambre		
2026	O'Romeo	Ustara		
2026	Cocktail 2	Kunal Kapoor		

== Television ==
Year	Title	Role	Notes	Ref.
1998	Mohandas B.A.L.L.B	—N/a	Television series; assistant director	
2010	16th Star Screen Awards	Host	Television special	
2011	17th Star Screen Awards	Host	Television special	
2012	18th Colors Screen Awards	Host	Television special	
2012	13th International Indian Film Academy Awards	Host	Television special	
2013	14th International Indian Film Academy Awards	Host	Television special	
2014	15th International Indian Film Academy Awards	Host	Television special	
2015	Jhalak Dikhhla Jaa Reloaded	Judge	Reality show	
2016	Zee Cine Awards	Host	Television special	
2016	17th International Indian Film Academy Awards	Host	Television special	
2023	Farzi	Sunny	Television series	

== Music video ==
Year	Title	Performer(s)	Ref(s)
1999	"Aankhon Mein"	Aryans	
1999	"Mera Dil Bole Piya Piya"	Poornima	
2000	"Kehna To Hai"	Kumar Sanu	
2001	"Jaan Likhu Janam Likhu"	Riddhi	
2002	"Koi To Baat Hai"	Sadhana Sargam	
2010	"Doli Doli"	Falguni Pathak	
2010	"Phir Mile Sur Mera Tumhara"	Various	
2018	"Urvashi"	Yo Yo Honey Singh	

== See also ==
- List of awards and nominations received by Shahid Kapoor
