= List of accolades received by Haider (film) =

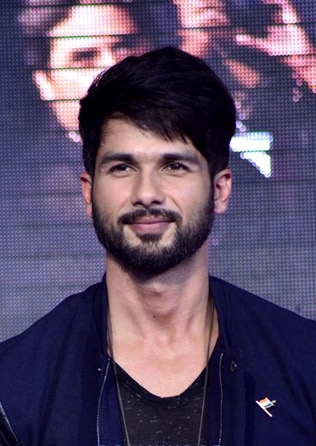
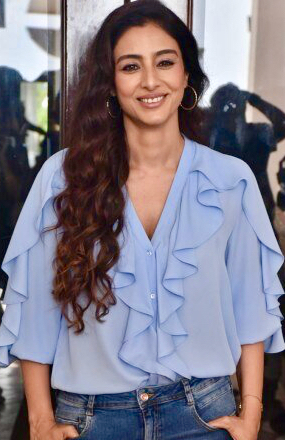
The performances of Shahid Kapoor and Tabu garnered critical acclaim and they both received several awards.

Haider is a 2014 Indian crime-drama film directed by Vishal Bhardwaj, and produced by Bhardwaj and Siddharth Roy Kapur. The film stars Shahid Kapoor as the eponymous protagonist, and co-stars Tabu, Kay Kay Menon, Shraddha Kapoor, and Irrfan Khan. Bhardwaj wrote the dialogues for the film, and co-wrote the screenplay with Basharat Peer. Bhardwaj also composed the music and Gulzar wrote the lyrics. The film is a modern-day adaptation of William Shakespeare's tragedy Hamlet, and tells the story of Haider who searches for his missing father during the Kashmir conflict of 1995.

Produced on a budget of ₹240 million (US$2.8 million), Haider was released on 2 October 2014, and grossed ₹690 million (US$8.2 million) worldwide. The film garnered awards and nominations in several categories, with particular praise for its direction, performances of Shahid Kapoor and Tabu, music and production design. As of June 2015, the film has won 36 awards.

At the 62nd National Film Awards, Haider earned five awards, more than any other film at the ceremony, including Best Music Direction and Best Screenplay (Dialogues) (both Bhardwaj). Haider also won five awards at the 60th Filmfare Awards ceremony, including Best Actor (Shahid Kapoor), Best Supporting Actor (Menon), and Best Supporting Actress (Tabu). It also received nominations for Best Film and Best Director at the ceremony. At the 2015 Screen Awards, Haider received nominations for Best Film and Best Director, and won five awards, including Best Actor and Best Supporting Actress. Haider also won nine awards at the 16th ceremony of the International Indian Film Academy Awards, including Best Actor and Best Supporting Actress.

== Awards and nominations ==
Award	Date of ceremony (Note: Date is linked to the article about the awards held that year, wherever possible.)	Category	Recipients	Result	Refs
Asian Film Awards	25 March 2015	Best Film	Haider	Nominated	
Asian Film Awards	25 March 2015	Best Director	Vishal Bhardwaj	Nominated	
Asian Film Awards	25 March 2015	Best Supporting Actress	Tabu	Nominated	
Asian Film Awards	25 March 2015	Best Production Designer	Subrata Chakraborty, Amit Ray	Nominated	
BIG Star Entertainment Awards	18 December 2014	Most Entertaining Film	Haider	Won	
BIG Star Entertainment Awards	18 December 2014	Most Entertaining Actor (Film) – Male	Shahid Kapoor	Won	
BIG Star Entertainment Awards	18 December 2014	Most Entertaining Actor in a Thriller Film – Female	Tabu	Won	
BIG Star Entertainment Awards	18 December 2014	Most Entertaining Director (Film)	Vishal Bhardwaj	Nominated	
BIG Star Entertainment Awards	18 December 2014	Most Entertaining Dancer – Male/Female	Shahid Kapoor	Nominated	
BIG Star Entertainment Awards	18 December 2014	Most Entertaining Actor in a Thriller Film – Male	Shahid Kapoor	Nominated	
BIG Star Entertainment Awards	18 December 2014	Most Entertaining Actor in a Thriller Film – Male	Kay Kay Menon	Nominated	
BIG Star Entertainment Awards	18 December 2014	Most Entertaining Thriller film	Haider	Nominated	
BIG Star Entertainment Awards	18 December 2014	Most Entertaining Actor in a Romantic Film – Female	Shraddha Kapoor	Nominated	
Filmfare Awards	31 January 2015	Best Film	Haider	Nominated	
Filmfare Awards	31 January 2015	Best Director	Vishal Bhardwaj	Nominated	
Filmfare Awards	31 January 2015	Best Actor	Shahid Kapoor	Won	
Filmfare Awards	31 January 2015	Best Supporting Actor	Kay Kay Menon	Won	
Filmfare Awards	31 January 2015	Best Supporting Actress	Tabu	Won	
Filmfare Awards	31 January 2015	Best Lyricist	Gulzar (for song "Bismil")	Nominated	
Filmfare Awards	31 January 2015	Best Art Direction	Subrata Chakraborty, Amit Ray	Won	
Filmfare Awards	31 January 2015	Best Costume Design	Dolly Ahluwalia	Won	
Filmfare Awards	31 January 2015	Best Sound Design	Shajith Koyeri	Nominated	
Global Indian Music Academy Awards	24 February 2015	Best Background Score	Vishal Bhardwaj	Won	
Global Indian Music Academy Awards	24 February 2015	Best Playback Singer – Female	Rekha Bhardwaj (for song "Aaj Ke Naam")	Nominated	
Global Indian Music Academy Awards	24 February 2015	Best Playback Singer – Male	Sukhwinder Singh (for song "Bismil")	Nominated	
Global Indian Music Academy Awards	24 February 2015	Best Lyricist	Gulzar (for song "Bismil")	Won	
Global Indian Music Academy Awards	24 February 2015	Best Film Album	Haider	Nominated	
International Indian Film Academy Awards	7 June 2015 (Note: The awards in the technical categories were announced on 22 April 2015. The presentation for the awards in the technical category was held on 5 June 2015, and the main award ceremony took place on 7 June 2015.)	Best Movie	Haider	Nominated	
International Indian Film Academy Awards	7 June 2015	Best Director	Vishal Bhardwaj	Nominated	
International Indian Film Academy Awards	7 June 2015	Best Actor	Shahid Kapoor	Won	
International Indian Film Academy Awards	7 June 2015	Best Supporting Actor	Kay Kay Menon	Nominated	
International Indian Film Academy Awards	7 June 2015	Best Supporting Actress	Tabu	Won	
International Indian Film Academy Awards	7 June 2015	Best Performance in a Negative Role	Kay Kay Menon	Won	
International Indian Film Academy Awards	7 June 2015	Best Music Director	Vishal Bhardwaj	Nominated	
International Indian Film Academy Awards	7 June 2015	Best Male Playback	Sukhwinder Singh (for song "Bismil")	Nominated	
International Indian Film Academy Awards	7 June 2015	Best Background Score	Vishal Bhardwaj	Won	
International Indian Film Academy Awards	7 June 2015	Best Costume Design	Dolly Ahluwalia	Won	
International Indian Film Academy Awards	7 June 2015	Best Sound Recording	Shajith Koyeri	Won	
International Indian Film Academy Awards	7 June 2015	Best Sound Re-Recording	Debajit Changmai	Won	
International Indian Film Academy Awards	7 June 2015	Best Art Direction	Subrata Chakraborty, Amit Ray	Won	
International Indian Film Academy Awards	7 June 2015	Best Makeup	Preetisheel Singh, Clover Wootton	Won	
Mirchi Music Awards	27 February 2015	Lyricist of The Year	Gulzar (for song "Bismil")	Nominated	
Mirchi Music Awards	27 February 2015	Music Composer of The Year	Vishal Bhardwaj (for song "Bismil")	Nominated	
Mirchi Music Awards	27 February 2015	Upcoming Female Vocalist of The Year	Shraddha Kapoor (for song "Do Jahaan")	Nominated	
Mirchi Music Awards	27 February 2015	Raag Based Song	"Jhelum"	Nominated	
Mirchi Music Awards	27 February 2015	Background Score of the Year	Vishal Bhardwaj	Won	
National Film Awards	3 May 2015	Best Screenplay	Vishal Bhardwaj	Won	
National Film Awards	3 May 2015	Best Music Direction	Vishal Bhardwaj	Won	
National Film Awards	3 May 2015	Best Male Playback Singer	Sukhwinder Singh (for song "Bismil")	Won	
National Film Awards	3 May 2015	Best Choreography	Suresh Adhana (for song "Bismil")	Won	
National Film Awards	3 May 2015	Best Costume Design	Dolly Ahluwalia	Won	
Rome Film Festival	26 October 2014	People's Choice Award in the Mondo Genre	Haider	Won	
Screen Awards	14 January 2015	Best Film	Haider	Nominated	
Screen Awards	14 January 2015	Best Director	Vishal Bhardwaj	Nominated	
Screen Awards	14 January 2015	Best Actor	Shahid Kapoor	Won	
Screen Awards	14 January 2015	Best Actor – Popular Choice	Shahid Kapoor	Nominated	
Screen Awards	14 January 2015	Best Supporting Actor	Kay Kay Menon	Nominated	
Screen Awards	14 January 2015	Best Supporting Actress	Tabu	Won	
Screen Awards	14 January 2015	Best Actor in a Negative Role	Kay Kay Menon	Nominated	
Screen Awards	14 January 2015	Jodi No. 1	Shahid Kapoor, Tabu	Won	
Screen Awards	14 January 2015	LifeOK Hero Award (Male)	Shahid Kapoor	Won	
Screen Awards	14 January 2015	Best Cinematography	Pankaj Kumar	Nominated	
Screen Awards	14 January 2015	Best Production Design	Subrata Chakraborty, Amit Ray	Won	
Screen Awards	14 January 2015	Best Choreography	Suresh Adhana (for song "Bismil")	Nominated	
Star Guild Awards (Note: Also known as Apsara Film & Television Producers Guild Awards.)	12 January 2015	Best Film	Haider	Nominated	
Star Guild Awards	12 January 2015	Best Director	Vishal Bhardwaj	Nominated	
Star Guild Awards	12 January 2015	Best Actor in a Leading Role	Shahid Kapoor	Won	
Star Guild Awards	12 January 2015	Best Actress in a Supporting Role	Tabu	Won	
Star Guild Awards	12 January 2015	Best Actor in a Supporting Role	Irrfan Khan	Nominated	
Star Guild Awards	12 January 2015	Best Actor in a Negative Role	Kay Kay Menon	Nominated	
Star Guild Awards	12 January 2015	Best Male Playback Singer	Sukhwinder Singh (for song "Bismil")	Nominated	
Star Guild Awards	12 January 2015	Best Screenplay	Vishal Bhardwaj, Basharat Peer	Nominated	
Star Guild Awards	12 January 2015	Best Dialogue	Vishal Bhardwaj	Nominated	
Star Guild Awards	12 January 2015	Best Music Director	Vishal Bhardwaj (for song "Bismil")	Nominated	
Star Guild Awards	12 January 2015	Best Sound Design	Shajith Koyeri	Won	
Stardust Awards	15 December 2014	Film of the Year	Haider	Nominated	
Stardust Awards	15 December 2014	Dream Director	Vishal Bhardwaj	Nominated	
Stardust Awards	15 December 2014	Best Actor in a Drama	Shahid Kapoor	Won	
Stardust Awards	15 December 2014	Best Actress in a Drama	Shraddha Kapoor	Nominated	
Stardust Awards	15 December 2014	Star of the Year – Male	Shahid Kapoor	Nominated	
Stardust Awards	15 December 2014	Best Supporting Actress	Tabu	Won	
Stardust Awards	15 December 2014	Best Actor in a Negative Role	Kay Kay Menon	Nominated	
Stardust Awards	15 December 2014	Best Lyricist	Gulzar (for song "Bismil")	Nominated	

== See also ==
- List of Bollywood films of 2014
