= List of accolades received by Kaminey =

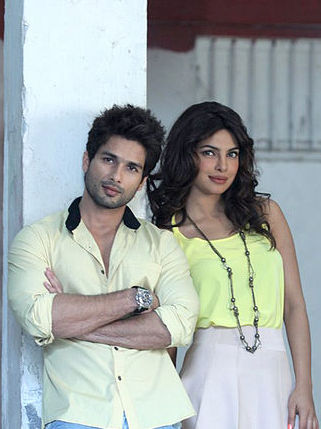
Shahid Kapoor and Priyanka Chopra received several nominations for their respective performances in Kaminey.

Kaminey (English: Rascal) is a 2009 Indian action thriller film directed by Vishal Bhardwaj and produced by Ronnie Screwvala. Shahid Kapoor, Priyanka Chopra, and Amol Gupte star in the lead roles. The film's screenplay was written by Bhardwaj, Abhishek Chaubey, Sabrina Dhawan, and Supratik Sen. Bhardwaj also composed the soundtrack of the film, with lyrics written by Gulzar. Kaminey was edited by A. Sreekar Prasad, and Meghna Manchanda Sen, and the cinematography was provided by Tassaduq Hussain. Set against the backdrop of the Mumbai underworld, the film focuses on the rivalry between identical twin brothers both played by Kapoor, one with a lisp and the other with a stutter, over the course of a single day.

Made on a budget of ₹350 million (US$3.7 million), Kaminey released on 14 August 2009 to critical acclaim and was a commercial success, grossing over ₹710 million (US$7.5 million). The film's soundtrack was also a critical and commercial success, with the song "Dhan Te Nan" topping the charts. Over the years, Kaminey achieved cult status. The film garnered awards and nominations in several categories, with praise for its direction, performance of the cast, screenplay, musical score, cinematography, editing and sound design.

At the 57th National Film Awards, Kaminey won Best Audiography for Subash Sahoo, whereas Prasad received a Special Jury Award for editing. At the 55th Filmfare Awards, it received most nominations (ten), including Best Film, Best Director and Best Music Director for Bhardwaj, Best Actor for Kapoor, Best Actress for Chopra, and Best Supporting Actor for Gupte, winning the award for Best Special Effects. It received a leading 19 nominations at the 2010 Screen Awards, including Best Film, Best Director, Best Actor, and Best Actress; winning Best Actor Popular for Kapoor. Kaminey received the most nominations at the 2009 Star Guild Awards, including Best Film, Best Director and won two awards: Best Actor in a Negative Role for Gupte and Best Actress in a Leading Role for Chopra, her second consecutive win after Fashion (2008).

== Accolades ==
Award	Date of ceremony (Note: Date is linked to the article about the awards held that year, wherever possible.)	Category	Recipients	Result	Ref.
Apsara Film & Television Producers Guild Awards (Note: Also known as Star Guild Awards.)	8 January 2010	Best Film	Kaminey	Nominated	
Apsara Film & Television Producers Guild Awards	8 January 2010	Best Director	Vishal Bhardwaj	Nominated	
Apsara Film & Television Producers Guild Awards	8 January 2010	Best Actor in a Leading Role	Shahid Kapoor	Nominated	
Apsara Film & Television Producers Guild Awards	8 January 2010	Best Actress in a Leading Role	Priyanka Chopra	Won	
Apsara Film & Television Producers Guild Awards	8 January 2010	Best Actor in a Negative Role	Amole Gupte	Won	
Apsara Film & Television Producers Guild Awards	8 January 2010	Best Lyricist	Gulzar (for song "Dhan Te Nan")	Nominated	
Apsara Film & Television Producers Guild Awards	8 January 2010	Best Male Playback Singer	Vishal Dadlani, Sukhwinder Singh (for song "Dhan Te Nan")	Nominated	
Apsara Film & Television Producers Guild Awards	8 January 2010	Best Screenplay	Vishal Bhardwaj, Abhishek Chaubey, Sabrina Dhawan, Supratik Sen	Nominated	
Apsara Film & Television Producers Guild Awards	8 January 2010	Best Editing	Meghna Manchanda Sen	Nominated	
Apsara Film & Television Producers Guild Awards	8 January 2010	Best Cinematography	Tassaduq Hussain	Nominated	
Apsara Film & Television Producers Guild Awards	8 January 2010	Best Choreography	Ahmed Khan	Nominated	
Filmfare Awards	22 February 2010	Best Film	Kaminey	Nominated	
Filmfare Awards	22 February 2010	Best Director	Vishal Bhardwaj	Nominated	
Filmfare Awards	22 February 2010	Best Actor	Shahid Kapoor	Nominated	
Filmfare Awards	22 February 2010	Best Actress	Priyanka Chopra	Nominated	
Filmfare Awards	22 February 2010	Best Supporting Actor	Amole Gupte	Nominated	
Filmfare Awards	22 February 2010	Best Music Director	Vishal Bhardwaj	Nominated	
Filmfare Awards	22 February 2010	Best Lyricist	Gulzar (for song "Dhan Te Nan")	Nominated	
Filmfare Awards	22 February 2010	Best Lyricist	Gulzar (for song "Kaminey")	Nominated	
Filmfare Awards	22 February 2010	Best Male Playback Singer	Vishal Dadlani, Sukhwinder Singh (for song "Dhan Te Nan")	Nominated	
Filmfare Awards	22 February 2010	Best Special Effects	Govardhan Vigraham	Won	
Global Indian Music Academy Awards	10 November 2010	Most Popular Caller Tune	Vishal Bhardwaj (for song "Dhan Te Nan")	Won	
Global Indian Music Academy Awards	10 November 2010	Best Music Director	Vishal Bhardwaj	Won	
Global Indian Music Academy Awards	10 November 2010	Best Music Arranger and Programmer	Clinton Cerejo, Hitesh Sonik (for song "Dhan Te Nan")	Won	
International Indian Film Academy Awards	5 June 2010	Best Film	Kaminey	Nominated	
International Indian Film Academy Awards	5 June 2010	Best Director	Vishal Bhardwaj	Nominated	
International Indian Film Academy Awards	5 June 2010	Best Actor	Shahid Kapoor	Nominated	
International Indian Film Academy Awards	5 June 2010	Best Actress	Priyanka Chopra	Nominated	
International Indian Film Academy Awards	5 June 2010	Best Performance in a Negative Role	Amole Gupte	Nominated	
International Indian Film Academy Awards	5 June 2010	Best Music Director	Vishal Bhardwaj	Nominated	
International Indian Film Academy Awards	5 June 2010	Best Lyricist	Gulzar	Nominated	
International Indian Film Academy Awards	5 June 2010	Best Male Playback	Vishal Dadlani, Sukhwinder Singh (for song "Dhan Te Nan")	Nominated	
International Indian Film Academy Awards	5 June 2010	Best Action	Shyam Kaushal	Won	
National Film Awards	22 October 2010	Special Jury Award for Film editing	A. Sreekar Prasad	Won (Note: Also for the Malayalam language films, Kerala Varma Pazhassi Raja and Kutty Srank.)	
National Film Awards	22 October 2010	Best Audiography	Subash Sahoo	Won	
Screen Awards	9 January 2010	Best Film	Kaminey	Nominated	
Screen Awards	9 January 2010	Best Director	Vishal Bhardwaj	Nominated	
Screen Awards	9 January 2010	Best Actor	Shahid Kapoor	Nominated	
Screen Awards	9 January 2010	Best Actress	Priyanka Chopra	Nominated	
Screen Awards	9 January 2010	Best Actor (Popular Choice)	Shahid Kapoor	Won	
Screen Awards	9 January 2010	Best Actress (Popular Choice)	Priyanka Chopra	Nominated	
Screen Awards	9 January 2010	Jodi No. 1	Priyanka Chopra, Shahid Kapoor	Nominated	
Screen Awards	9 January 2010	Best Villain	Amole Gupte	Nominated	
Screen Awards	9 January 2010	Best Music Director	Vishal Bhardwaj	Nominated	
Screen Awards	9 January 2010	Best Male Playback	Vishal Dadlani, Sukhwinder Singh (for song "Dhan Te Nan")	Nominated	
Screen Awards	9 January 2010	Best Best Background Music	Vishal Bhardwaj	Nominated	
Screen Awards	9 January 2010	Most Promising Newcomer – Male	Amole Gupte	Nominated	
Screen Awards	9 January 2010	Most Promising Newcomer – Male	Chandan Roy Sanyal	Nominated	
Screen Awards	9 January 2010	Best Dialogue	Vishal Bhardwaj	Nominated	
Screen Awards	9 January 2010	Best Editing	A. Sreekar Prasad, Meghna Manchanda Sen	Nominated	
Screen Awards	9 January 2010	Best Cinematography	Tassaduq Hussain	Nominated	
Screen Awards	9 January 2010	Best Art Direction	Samir Chanda	Nominated	
Screen Awards	9 January 2010	Best Action	Shyam Kaushal	Nominated	
Screen Awards	9 January 2010	Best Sound Design	Shajith Koyeri, P. M. Satheesh, Subash Sahoo	Nominated	
Stardust Awards	17 January 2010	Best Film of the Year – Action / Thriller	Kaminey	Nominated	
Stardust Awards	17 January 2010	Dream Director	Vishal Bhardwaj	Nominated	
Stardust Awards	17 January 2010	Star of the Year – Male	Shahid Kapoor	Nominated	
Stardust Awards	17 January 2010	Star of the Year – Female	Priyanka Chopra	Nominated	
Stardust Awards	17 January 2010	Editor's Choice Best Actor	Shahid Kapoor	Won	
Stardust Awards	17 January 2010	Breakthrough Performance – Male	Amole Gupte	Nominated	
Stardust Awards	17 January 2010	Breakthrough Performance – Male	Chandan Roy Sanyal	Nominated	
V Shantaram Awards	21 December 2009	Best Supporting Actor	Amole Gupte	Nominated	
V Shantaram Awards	21 December 2009	Best Music	Vishal Bhardwaj	Nominated	
V Shantaram Awards	21 December 2009	Best Editing	Meghna Manchanda Sen	Nominated	
V Shantaram Awards	21 December 2009	Best Choreography	Ahmed Khan, Raju Sundaram	Nominated	

== See also ==
- List of Bollywood films of 2009
