= Mira Rajput Kapoor =

Indian businesswoman and entrepreneur (born 1994)

- Rajput in 2018
- Born: Mira Rajput; 7 September 1994 (age 32); Delhi, India
- Education: Lady Shri Ram College for Women
- Occupations: Businesswoman, entrepreneur
- Spouse: Shahid Kapoor (m. 2015)
- Children: 2

Mira Rajput Kapoor (born 7 September 1994) is an Indian entrepreneur and businesswoman. and the founder of Dhun, a luxury wellness sanctuary in Mumbai.

== Early life and education ==
Mira Rajput Kapoor was born in Delhi into a Punjabi family. She completed her schooling at Vasant Valley School, New Delhi, and graduated from Lady Shri Ram College for Women with an English Honours degree. During her youth, Mira initially considered a career in medicine and completed internships, including one at a hospital and another in a pet-care company, where she gained early work experience.

== Career ==
In June 2024, Mira co-founded Akind, a vegan, cruelty-free skincare brand in partnership with Reliance Retail's Tira Beauty, led by Isha Ambani. The brand emphasizes simple, barrier-care focused formulations designed for Indian skin. Mira actively participated in product development, aiming to create inclusive skincare solutions. The brand's tagline is “Your skin is one of a kind,” highlighting individuality.

In May 2025, Mira launched Dhun, a luxury wellness sanctuary in Bandra, Mumbai. The 6,000 sq ft space combines ayurveda, traditional Chinese medicine, sound therapy, and other holistic treatments like cryotherapy and red-light therapy. Dhun reflects Mira's passion for music and sound healing and is positioned as a space for renewal and mindful self-care.

== Personal life ==
Mira married Bollywood actor Shahid Kapoor in 2015 in an arranged marriage facilitated through their families' connections with the Radha Soami Satsang Beas spiritual community. The couple have two children, daughter Misha (born 2016) and son Zain (born 2018). Mira has spoken publicly about the challenges of marrying young, the balance of motherhood and career, and her role in parenting.
