= Teri Meri Kahaani (film) =

2012 film by Kunal Kohli

- Theatrical release poster
- Directed by: Kunal Kohli
- Written by: Story & Dialogues: Kunal Kohli
- Screenplay by: Robin Bhatt; Kunal Kohli
- Produced by: Kunal Kohli; Vicky Bahri; Sunil Lulla
- Starring: Shahid Kapoor; Priyanka Chopra
- Cinematography: Sunil Patel
- Edited by: Amitabh Shukla
- Music by: Songs: Sajid–Wajid; Background Score: Sandeep Shirodkar
- Production companies: Kunal Kohli Productions; Eros International
- Distributed by: Eros International; Wave Cinemas
- Release date: 22 June 2012
- Running time: 115 minutes
- Country: India
- Language: Hindi
- Budget: ₹300 million
- Box office: ₹540 million

Teri Meri Kahaani (transl. The story of you and me) is a 2012 Indian Hindi-language romantic comedy film directed by Kunal Kohli. Shahid Kapoor and Priyanka Chopra in a triple role portray three couples from three different eras. In 1910 Sargodha, they are two star-crossed lovers during the British Raj; in 1960 Mumbai, a popular Bollywood actress and a struggling musician; and in 2012 London, two university students.

Kohli conceived Teri Meri Kahaani from the idea of soulmates, showing the strength of love beyond generations by having the same two actors portray all three couples without using a reincarnation theme. He co-wrote the film with Robin Bhatt. Muneesh Sappel created three sets for depicting the different time periods, requiring months of research and detailed designs. Principal photography began in Mumbai in mid-2011 and later moved to London, where it was primarily shot at the Jubilee Campus of the University of Nottingham and Stratford-upon-Avon.

Sajid–Wajid composed the soundtrack with lyrics by Prasoon Joshi. The film was released on 22 June 2012 to mixed–to–positive reviews from critics, receiving praise mostly for the performances of the lead pair and their chemistry, the music and the production design, especially the re-creation of 1960s Mumbai, but were disappointed with the story's predictability. Made on a budget of ₹300 million, the film grossed ₹540 million. This film marks the first time Kohli directing a film outside Yash Raj Films.

== Plot ==
In 1960, aspiring musician Govind and popular Bollywood superstar Rukhsar met on a train heading to Bombay, India. Ruksar had run away from her home in Lucknow with her best friend to become a film star. The two bond over their careers but part ways after arriving in Bombay. Govind befriends Radhika, a confident and modern girl who is charmed by his simplicity. Rukhsar and Govind meet again and hit it off at a party, but Govind notices a photojournalist following them. He holds Radhika's hand to mislead the journalist, unaware that Radhika has fallen in love with him. Radhika is the best friend Rukhsar had run away with, and the two tell each other about the man they've fallen in love with, not realising he is the same person. When Rukhsar, Radhika, and Govind all meet, the three realise what happened and brokenheartedly part ways.

In London in 2012, college students Krrish and Radha meet after Krrish breaks up with his girlfriend, Meera, on his birthday. After a misunderstanding between Krrish and Radha is cleared, they become friends and spend time getting to know each other. When Meera learns that Krrish is with Radha, she angrily uploads embarrassing photos of him to Facebook that go viral. Radha learns that Krrish spent the night with her on his birthday only two hours after he broke up with Meera, but when she tries to talk to him, he is too busy retaliating against Meera. Frustrated and heartbroken, Radha leaves.

The film rewinds to 1910 Sargodha during the times of the British Raj. Javed, a Punjabi Muslim womaniser with a talent for reciting poetry, meets Aradhana, a young woman in the village, while being chased by the police. They become acquainted, but Javed's flirty nature upsets Aradhana. Javed insists she is special and focuses all his attention on her. He joins Aradhana's father in a protest for freedom from the British, but when officers begin to physically abuse the protestors, Javed hides while Aradhana's father is beaten. Aradhana is disgusted with him. To appease her, Javed allows himself to be beaten and arrested in front of her. She visits him in jail and tells him their love cannot happen, but he asks her to wait. Three months later, Javed is freed, but he learns that Aradhana was married a month before. Aradhana tells Javed in tears that she only married to make her father happy. Soon after, Javed also must marry for his father's happiness. Aradhana comes to the wedding to see him one last time. During the vows, Javed realises Aradhana is wearing a widow's clothes and stops the wedding, insisting on marrying Aradhana.

To conclude, all three couples are revisited. In 1960, Govind packs up and boards a train, but is followed by Rukhsar, and the two reconcile. In 2012, Krrish speaks to Meera and Radha one more time, severing ties with Meera and confessing his true love to Radha. In 1910, Javed and Aradhana vow that their love will not only last this lifetime but for all lifetimes to come.

== Cast ==
- Shahid Kapoor in a triple role as
  - Govind, an aspiring musician (1960 in Mumbai)
  - Krrish Kapoor, a student (2012 in London)
  - Javed Qadri, a poet (1910 in Sargodha, British Raj)
- Priyanka Chopra in a triple role as
  - Rukhsar, a movie star (1960 in Mumbai)
  - Radha Chopra, a student at University of Nottingham (2012 in London)
  - Aradhana, a freedom fighter (1910 in Sargodha, British Raj)
- Vrajesh Hirjee as Unnamed, journalist spying on Rukhsar and Govind
- Shankar Sachdev as Suleman Qadri, Javed's father
- Raj Singh Arora as Rohan / Bharat
- Surendra Pal as Aradhana's father
- Tarun Sharma as
  - Chirag, Krrish's friend
  - Salim, Javed's friend
- Aman Nagpal as Balwinder
- Chand Mishra as Gangadhar, Ruksar's manager
- Kunal Kohli as the Narrator

== Production ==
=== Development ===
Director Kunal Kohli was fascinated with the idea of soulmates and conceived the film as a tale of "the strength of love beyond generations". The premise would be a love story with the same two actors in three different time period that did not involve reincarnation. He said, "It's the story of three different lives and proves that love is a promise forever. We have chosen one hundred years to talk about love. We didn't want it to be soppy or melodramatic."

Kohli co-wrote the screenplay with Robin Bhatt. He found it difficult to represent three time periods, but felt that the film could appeal to everyone if he chose to "keep some of it in the past and still make it youthful and modern." He said, "I have created humour and situations which would be liked by everyone". For instance, he chose to display a different side to the Indian independence movement of the 1910s as opposed to the "unromantic and non-colourful" depiction. Kohli said "everyone takes a very serious approach to that part of the history," so he instead used it to frame a love story between a Punjabi belle and a Casanova.

1960s Bollywood also fascinated Kohli, who wanted to pay tribute to Raj Kapoor, Dev Anand, Shammi Kapoor, and Dilip Kumar. However, rather than remaking films of the past, he "remade a whole era. It is much easy to remake a film, remaking an entire era is not a cakewalk; it is a very challenging task."

Through the final storyline of the film, set in 2012, Kohli wanted to demonstrate a modern romance, which mostly happens through SMS, instant messaging apps, and Internet chat. Kohli described it by saying, "Today people flirt, communicate and connect through smses and you get that feeling of being with somebody even when you are not with that person because that person is telling you everything that is happening in their life. You are constantly updating the other person with your thoughts and that is what keeps you connected to that person."

In February 2011, it was announced that Kohli would be producing the film with Eros International. Amitabh Shukla was chosen to edit the film while Sandeep Shirodkar was brought in to compose the background score.

=== Casting ===
In November 2010, Kohli announced that Shahid Kapoor would be starring in his untitled upcoming film and stated that he was looking to sign the leading actress in the next few days. In January 2011, Kohli confirmed Priyanka Chopra's casting on Twitter. This became the second film collaboration between the two actors after Kaminey (2009). Kohli said that he had always wanted to bring Kapoor and Chopra together for a "quintessential musical love story." Kohli had approached Kapoor for a different film while the script of Teri Meri Kahaani was still in development. When Kapoor asked about working together on a different film, Kohli proposed the as yet unwritten love story. Kapoor was confused but interested, and after Kohli explained the concept, he agreed to the role.

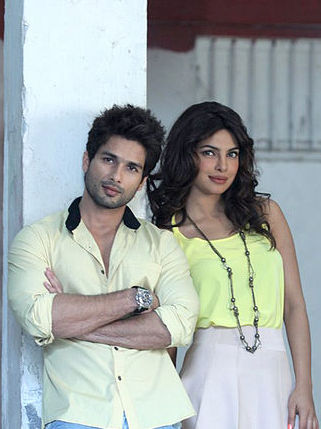
Shahid Kapoor and Priyanka Chopra were cast in the lead roles, making it their second film collaboration after Kaminey (2009).

Kohli had been in discussions with Chopra for a different project before, which would have paired her with Saif Ali Khan. At that time, Khan and Chopra had been asked to star together in a number of films, including 2 States, Cocktail, Race 2 and Vishal Bhardwaj's Dreams. Siddharth Anand's adaptation of 2 States would film at the same time as Kohli's proposed film. Anand and Kohli met and agreed that Chopra would act in 2 States. Later, Kohli approached Chopra with a new script, and she agreed to join the cast for Teri Meri Kahaani. Shahid Kapoor and Priyanka Chopra were cast to play Kapoor's love interests in the 1960s and 2012, respectively.

Kapoor said that of the three characters he plays—Javed the poet, Govind the struggling musician and Krish the college student—Krish is the closest to himself, but Javed was the most interesting, a type of character he had never played before. Javed uses shayari, a type of poetry, to flirt. "Shayaris are his pickup lines and very often he does succeed to getting the girls," said Kapoor. "He is not a sophisticated shayar and that is part of his charm." He also called Javed "the funniest and naughtiest character of 1910 I have ever seen." Despite the role being his favourite, Kapoor faced problems with the era-appropriate costume, which required him to wear traditional mojari shoes and clip-on stud earrings; he suffered from both shoe bites and red ears during filming.

Chopra faced the challenge of her triple roles by playing each one as differently as possible. She used the script to identify unique characteristics of each—Aradhana is a Punjabi girl, Ruksar speaks with the manners of a popular Bollywood actress from Lucknow, and Radha displays a contemporary confidence. Of the three, Chopra found playing a girl from 1910 to be the toughest. She said, "There was no reference point for it except some books," and the few sketches Kohli was able to provide for costume design. Even with only written sources, she worked toward developing an accent that would have been typical for a Punjabi girl from Pakistan. In contrast, Chopra was able to consult Saira Banu, a leading Hindi film actress of the 1960s, to understand the way her character Ruksar lived. Like Kapoor, Chopra enjoyed the novelty of playing a character in 1910, "a certain period which normally [she] would not get to play," and she related best to her contemporary character Radha. But for her Ruksar was the most interesting. "I got to play a superstar actress of the 1960s," she said. "I got to wear the glamorous clothes of those days, don big hair-dos and speak the way actresses spoke then. I loved all those things."

Manish Malhotra and Kunal Rawal designed the costumes for Chopra and Kapoor respectively. Malhotra also consulted Asha Parekh, who gave several insights into the life of actresses in her day, to design Chopra's costumes and look to play Ruksar.

=== Filming ===
Muneesh Sappel handled the art direction while Sunil Patel did the cinematography. Sappel created three sets depicting the 1910, 1960s and 2012 settings for the three storylines. He did extensive research for six months, visiting each location in person to ensure that the sets looked authentic and real, and using visual effects (VFX) to complete the designs.

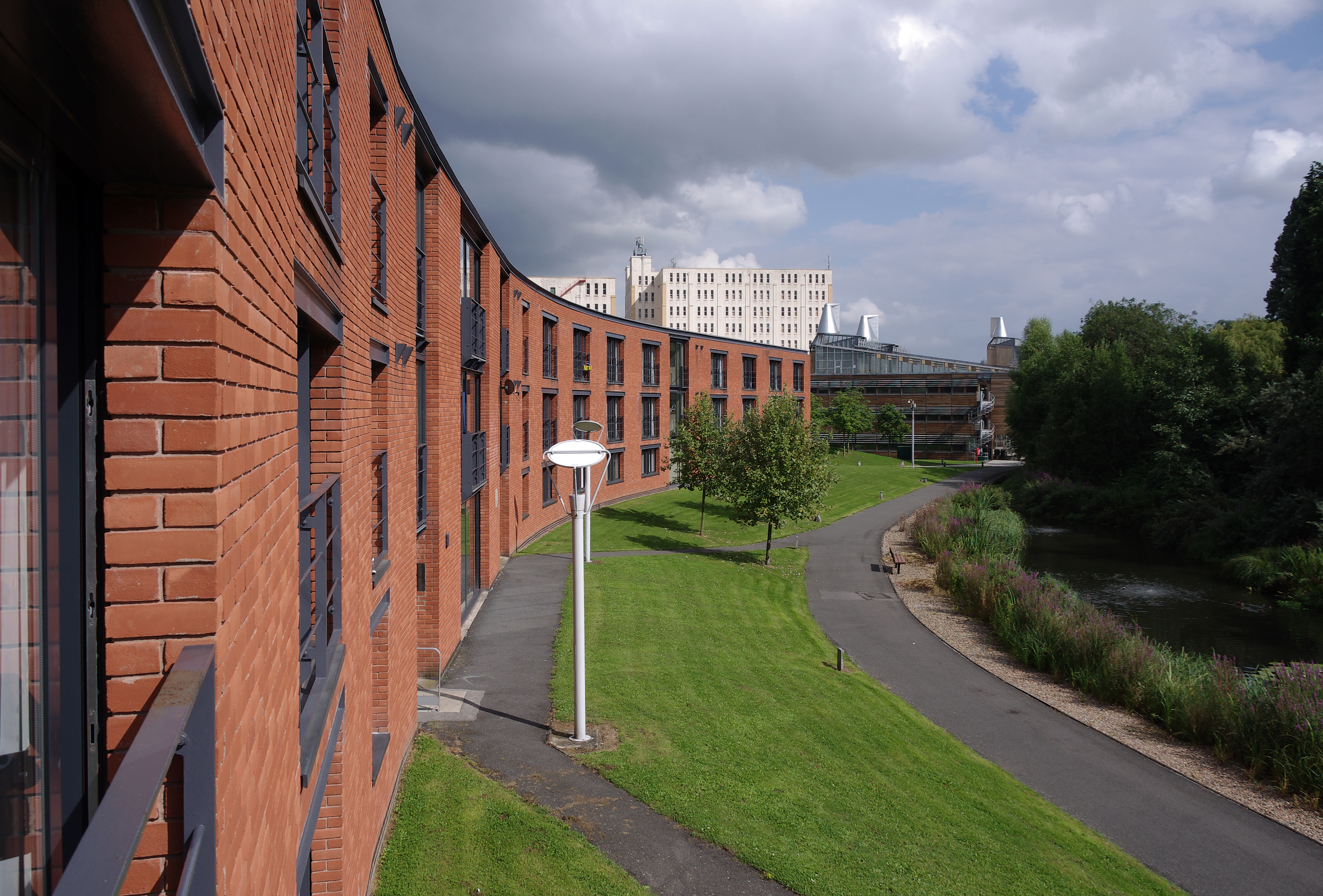
The Jubilee Campus at the University of Nottingham, where the 2012 story was shot

The 1910 portion, which is set in Sargodha, Punjab, during the British Empire, was easy to recreate with "a temple, mosque, market, a small village, brick houses etc." Initially, the crew wanted to use an actual village as the set, but were unable to find one that had not changed in the past century. Instead, they chose to construct a set that would be historically accurate. Sappel said that the set for 1960s Mumbai was much more time-consuming, with "trams, chawl, guest houses, old studios and old cinema houses" to create the intended atmosphere.

Principal photography started in Mumbai in late May 2011. The first stage of shooting was completed in early July 2011. Filming resumed at the end of the month, and continued until mid-August 2011. Initially, the London scenes were to be shot in September after the release of Mausam (2011), another film starring Kapoor. However, the release date was postponed one week to 16 September, causing the pre-release promotions to conflict with the existing shooting schedule. Chopra was scheduled to film Barfi! (2012) in July, but director Anurag Basu agreed to move filming to September so that Kohli could film with both Chopra and Kapoor in July.

The London portion, where Kapoor and Chopra portray two college students, was filmed at the University of Nottingham's Jubilee Campus and the Stratford-upon-Avon. Filming ended in January 2012 with a four-day long song shoot in Aurangabad, Maharashtra.

== Soundtrack ==
Teri Meri Kahaani

Soundtrack album by Sajid–Wajid
- Released: 7 June 2012
- Genre: Film soundtrack
- Labels: Eros Music & T-Series

Sajid–Wajid chronology
| Rowdy Rathore (2012) | Teri Meri Kahaani (2012) | Ek Tha Tiger (2012) |

The film's soundtrack was composed by Sajid–Wajid, with lyrics written by Prasoon Joshi. The album consists of five original songs and two remixes. The vocals were performed by Wajid, Rahat Fateh Ali Khan, Mika Singh, Shreya Ghoshal, Sonu Nigam, Sunidhi Chauhan and Shaan. It was released on 6 June 2012 by T-Series.

Track listing
| No. | Title | Singer(s) | Length |
|---|---|---|---|
| 1. | "Mukhtasar" | Wajid | 05:32 |
| 2. | "Allah Jaane" | Rahat Fateh Ali Khan | 05:27 |
| 3. | "Jabse Mere Dil Ko Uff" | Sonu Nigam, Sunidhi Chauhan | 04:43 |
| 4. | "Humse Pyar Kar Le Tu" | Wajid, Mika Singh, Shreya Ghoshal | 05:45 |
| 5. | "That's All I Really Wanna Do" | Shaan, Shreya Ghoshal | 03:01 |
| 6. | "Mukhtasar (Remix by DJ Suketu, Arranged by AKS)" | Wajid | 06:48 |
| 7. | "Humse Pyar Kar Le Tu (Remix by DJ Suketu, Arranged by AKS)" | Wajid, Mika Singh, Shreya Ghoshal | 04:51 |

The soundtrack received positive reviews from critics. Noting it as a "a very good success, especially so since it has melody at its base", Joginder Tuteja of Bollywood Hungama gave the album a rating of 4 out of 5, writing, "Sajid-Wajid and Prasoon Joshi can be rest assured that their music would reach out to the masses in a big way and find very good appreciation." Hindustan Times gave it a rating of 3.5 out of 5, praising its "youthful fervour" and adding that "the album manages to capture the essence of three different periods on which the film is premised." The Times of India gave it 3 out of 5, also commenting on its fresh and youthful feel, and calling it "another hit album" despite the fact that "it falls short in some songs". Koimoi gave the "good album" 3 out of 5 and wrote, "as a package it has enough ingredients in it that would ensure that the songs do catch your attention when they are played on screen." BBC identified the album as "A crowd pleaser featuring the cream of the industry's playback singers."

== Release ==
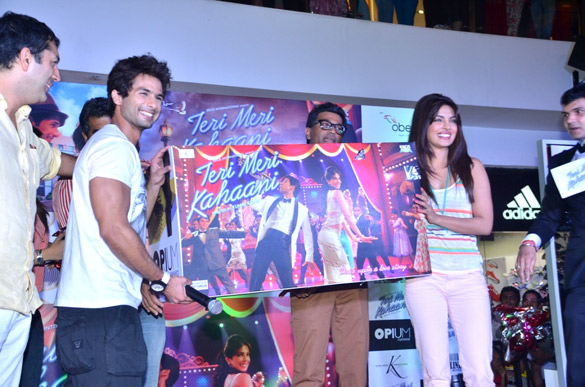
Kohli, Kapoor, and Chopra at a promotional event in 2012

Several stills from the films were released to the media before the trailer, which was posted online on 5 April 2012. Media publications noted the chemistry between Kapoor and Chopra, with Hindustan Times writing, "After a scintillating chemistry in Kaminey, Priyanka and Shahid look picture-perfect [and] ooze wonderful screen chemistry in each of their avatars." Following the release of the theatrical trailer, media started speculating that the film might be a remake of or inspired by the 2005 Taiwanese film Three Times, which has a similar theme. However, Kohli denied the speculations, saying that he had not even seen that film and any resemblance was just a coincidence. "Now-a-days if you want to remake a film, you just buy the rights and make the film," he said. "So if I wanted to make 'Three Times' I would have bought the rights." The first-look poster of the film was released on 9 April 2012. A second trailer was released on 5 June 2012. The film's trailers and music built anticipation for the film.

During the production stage, the film underwent several name changes. Initially, the media reported that the film was titled Janam Janam Ka Saath Hamara Tumhara, shortened to Janam Janam Ka Saath, but later it became Teri Meri Kahaani. In November 2011, reports began that the film's name might be changed again to Muqtasar. At the time Kohli stated only that they had not yet decided the title of the film. Such speculation was believed to be a marketing choice to increase curiosity for the film.

Made on a budget of ₹300 million, Teri Meri Kahaani was released on 22 June 2012, clashing with Gangs of Wasseypur - Part 1. The film had a "below the mark" opening, garnering only 30% collections. It performed best in the Delhi region. Reports stated that the only good news for the film was that collections had not dropped significantly on the second day. However, collections rose by the end of the weekend, amassing a total of ₹160 million for the film's opening weekend in India and a further $1.42 million overseas; its worldwide opening weekend collection stood at ₹295 million. By the fourth day it dropped around 55%. In its first week, the film went on to collect ₹230 million at the domestic box office and $2 million from overseas for a worldwide total of ₹414 million. By the end of its second week, it had collected domestically a total of ₹250 million. After its theatrical run, the film grossed over ₹370 million in India and $3 million from overseas for a worldwide total of over ₹540 million. The film underperformed at the Indian box-office, but performed well in the overseas market.

Distributed by Eros International, a DVD was released on 14 August 2012 in all regions in a single-disc pack in NTSC format, with no bonus content. The VCD version was released at the same time. The Indian television premiere occurred on 3 January 2014 on Zee Cinema.

== Critical reception ==
Critics praised the performances of the lead pair, their chemistry, the music and the production design, particularly the re-creation of 1960s Mumbai, but were disappointed with the story's predictability. Calling the film "uncomplicated and charming", Taran Adarsh from Bollywood Hungama gave the film a rating of 3.5 out of 5 and wrote, "Not the usual romantic fare, this one presents three different stories in three different eras without getting theatrical or melodramatic. Thanks to its innovative storytelling, it comes across as the perfect date movie, holding tremendous appeal for the Facebook Gen. Teri Meri Kahaani is pleasurable and fascinating in equal measures." He said that the chemistry between the lead actors was what made the film work, and noted the production design as "impressive" and the cinematography as "top notch". Sonia Chopra of Sify gave it 3 out of 5 stars, concluding, "Teri Meri Kahaani holds your attention whether it's the writing, storytelling, or the technical aspect. It's a popcorn cruncher, but that's also fairly intelligent and hearty." She added that the two leads "sparkle with earnestness and zing," with Kapoor "sure to increase his fan-following several fold" and Chopra "easily slipping in-and-out of the layered characters with dexterity."

Rummana Ahmed of Yahoo! movies labelled the film a "breezy romantic comedy which makes for an effortless watch". Calling the film "charming", Sukanya Verma of Rediff gave it 2.5 out of 5 stars, writing, "Teri Meri Kahaani, with its breezy running time and frothy leads, continues the tradition in a much better manner than I anticipated." She explained, "Kohli dilutes the chance of a wholesome, affable entertainer down by his predilection for risk-free conclusions. But [...] Teri Meri Kahaani is a far better film than I came to see."

Vinayak Chakravorty of India Today gave the film a rating of 2.5 out of 5, noting that the film tells the stories which "you and I already knew" and that the lead pair "hardly get a reason from the screenplay to give something extra to their roles." Daily News and Analysis gave it a rating of 2 out of 5 with a review stating, "The film does have its moments for sure. Overall, it remains a sweet film – a light and frothy entertainer, but without much substance." Firstpost gave it a rating of 2 out of 5, noting that the film was all about Kapoor and Chopra's "magnetic screen presence" in "the picturesque surroundings they fall in love in. Director Kunal Kohli's dialogues hit the right notes, but not always. The story goes a tad askew and a bit flat in parts, so as a whole, Teri Meri Kahaani is not the greatest love story ever told on celluloid." Rajeev Masand also gave it 2 out of 5 for being "harmless but dull"; though he said that the opening story "has a nice charm to it," he felt that the film "doesn't work despite potential in the premise."
