= Brian Hines =

American writer (born 1948)

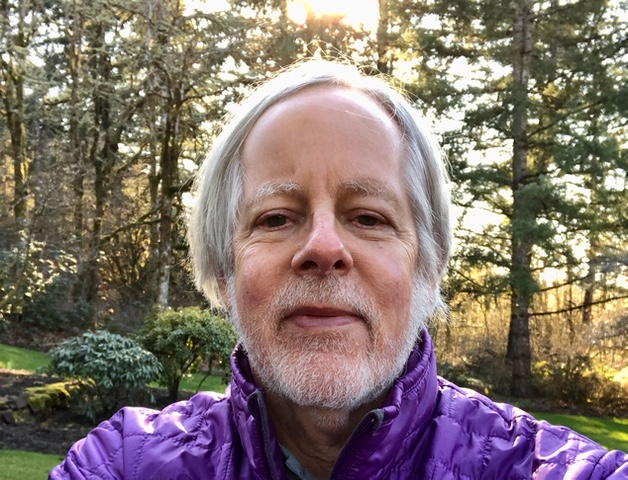
- Born: October 7, 1948 (age 77)
- Occupations: Writer and land-use activist
- Years active: 1973–present
- Known for: Books and blogs
- Notable work: Life Is Fair: The Law of Cause and Effect; Return to the One: Plotinus’s Guide to God-Realization
- Spouse: Laurel Hines

Brian Hines (born October 7, 1948) is an American writer and land-use activist known for his work opposing development on farm and forest land in Oregon. Over several decades, he has written about spirituality, public policy, and land-use issues, while maintaining an active presence in regional civic debates.

== Education ==
He earned a degree in psychology from San Jose State University in 1971, and a master's in social work from Portland State University in 1973. Hines completed course requirements for a Ph.D. in systems science at PSU from 1974 to 1977.

== Career ==
He worked in health policy and planning from 1973 to 1988: four years as a research associate at University of Oregon Health Sciences Center followed by six years at the Oregon State Health Planning and Development Agency, where he held various management roles. In the mid-1980s he co-founded Oregon Health Decisions, a statewide citizen network aimed at expanding public engagement with bioethical issues. As executive director, he led efforts to involve non-experts in discussions around medical ethics, resource allocation, and health policy.

After leaving government service, Hines became more active as a writer, exploring topics ranging from meditation and spirituality to public philosophy and local land-use controversies. His blogs and published works have been widely circulated among readers interested in comparative religion, skepticism, and civic engagement.

== Spirituality ==
In 1971, Hines became a member of Radha Soami Satsang Beas, a spiritual organization in Radha Soami movement. He was actively involved in the movement for several decades and wrote extensively about it. Over time, he became critical of the organization. He later adopted Samatha-Vipassanā meditation as his primary practice, reflecting a shift toward Buddhist-influenced mindfulness techniques.

== Writing and influence ==
Hines is the author of four published books on spirituality and philosophy. His first major philosophical work, Return to the One: Plotinus’s Guide to God-Realization, presents a modern interpretation of the teachings of the ancient Greek philosopher Plotinus. The book received scholarly attention, including a formal academic review in the Bryn Mawr Classical Review.

He later published Break Free of Dogma: Churchless Sermons Preaching the Gospel of Spiritual Independence, which argues for a non-institutional, experiential approach to spirituality. His third book, God’s Whisper, Creation’s Thunder: Echoes of Spiritual Reality in the New Physics, explores perceived connections between modern physics and spiritual experience.

His best-known popular work, Life Is Fair: The Law of Cause and Effect presents a moral argument centered on karma, ethical responsibility, and vegetarianism. The book gained international attention after Bollywood actor Shahid Kapoor publicly credited it with influencing his decision to become a vegetarian, bringing widespread visibility to Hines's writings in India and beyond.

In addition to his books, Hines maintains several long-running blogs addressing spirituality, skepticism, land-use policy, and local politics in Oregon: Church of the Churchless, HinesSight, and Salem Political Snark.

== Land use activism ==
Residing in Oregon for much of his adult life, Hines has been a vocal critic of urban expansion onto agricultural and forest land. Through public testimony, local commentary, and writing, he has contributed to debates surrounding rural preservation, zoning, and environmental protection in Salem and surrounding communities. His activism reflects a long-standing commitment to sustainable land-use planning and the protection of Oregon's rural landscapes.

== Personal life ==
Hines lives currently in Salem, Oregon with his wife, Laurel.

== Bibliography ==
- Hines, Brian. God’s Whisper, Creation’s Thunder ISBN 978-0977735235 is a study of how ancient mysteries relates to the new physics.
- Hines, Brian. Science, Spirit, and the Wisdom of Not-Knowing is a 24-page essay that also explores how science and spirituality relate.
- Hines, Brian. Life is Fair ASIN B000CBCXP2 is a modern discussion of karma, complete with cartoons, and why vegetarianism is both sensible and moral.
- Hines, Brian. Return to the One ISBN 978-0-9777352-1-1 is an exposition of the teachings of Plotinus, a Greek mystic philosopher.
- Hines, Brian. Break Free of Dogma: Churchless sermons preaching the gospel of spiritual independence ISBN 978-1081736712.
