= Vivah =

2006 film by Sooraj R. Barjatya

- Theatrical release poster
- Directed by: Sooraj R. Barjatya
- Screenplay by: Sooraj R. Barjatya
- Story by: Sooraj R. Barjatya
- Dialogue by: Aash Karan Atal
- Based on: Subhodrishti (Bengali) by Prabhat Roy
- Produced by: Ajit Kumar Barjatya; Kamal Kumar Barjatya; Rajkumar Barjatya
- Starring: Shahid Kapoor; Amrita Rao; Anupam Kher; Alok Nath
- Cinematography: Harish Joshi
- Music by: Ravindra Jain
- Distributed by: Rajshri Productions
- Release date: 10 November 2006
- Running time: 167 minutes
- Country: India
- Language: Hindi
- Budget: ₹8 crore
- Box office: est. ₹49.6 crore

Vivah (transl. Wedding – transl. Marriage) is a 2006 Indian Hindi-language romantic drama film written and directed by Sooraj R. Barjatya. Produced and distributed by Rajshri Productions, the film is a remake of the production's earlier Bengali film Subhodrishti (2005), with some plot changes. It stars Shahid Kapoor and Amrita Rao as lead, alongside Anupam Kher, Alok Nath, Seema Biswas, Amrita Prakash, Samir Soni and Lata Sabharwal. Vivah tells the story of two individuals, and relates their journey from engagement to marriage and aftermath.

Vivah is the fourth film to feature Shahid Kapoor opposite Amrita Rao. The film was released on 10 November 2006. It became a commercial success, and the tenth highest-grossing film of the year, grossing more than ₹49 crore (US$5.1 million) worldwide. Critical reception was mixed; some reviewers found it dramatically lacking and bloated, but it also has been credited for triggering changes to the way marriage is depicted on film. It became an unexpected success, as well as Kapoor and Rao's biggest commercial success at that point.

Kapoor and Rao's performance in the film earned them a nomination for Best Actor and Best Actress respectively at the Screen Awards. Vivah is the first Indian film to be simultaneously released in cinema and on the internet (through the production company's official site). The film was also dubbed into Telugu and released as Parinayam.

== Plot ==
Poonam is a middle-class girl living in the small town of Madhupur. Her parents died in her childhood, and since then, her uncle Krishnakant has filled a father's void in her life. However, his wife Rama is jealous of Poonam's beauty and unable to accept her, driven by the fact that their own daughter Rajni is darker in complexion and not as fair-skinned as her cousin. Despite this, Rajni and Poonam are close and consider themselves sisters. Harish Chandra Bajpayee, a renowned businessman in New Delhi, has two sons: the married Sunil and the soft-spoken and well-educated Prem.

Poonam's simple and affectionate demeanor impresses Bhagatji, a jeweller and Krishnakant's friend, who takes her marriage proposal for Prem. Harish asks for his son's opinion on the proposition. Hesitant, Prem feels he needs to focus on his career first. Harish convinces him to at least meet Poonam before deciding, which Prem agrees to. They visit the Mishras and let him get acquainted with Poonam. Prem and Poonam are instantly attracted to each other, agree to the marriage, and get engaged.

Krishnakant invites Bajpayees to their summer place in Som Sarovar so Prem and Poonam get to know each other better. The two go through the most magical and romantic period of their lives, begin to fall in love, and become attached. Later, Harish and his family return home to attend a business meeting urgently. Poonam and Prem communicate via telephone and letter. Prem joins the business and takes on an essential project in Japan.

Upon returning, the family brings Poonam as a surprise, and a celebration is held in honour of Poonam's first visit and Prem's successful business venture. During the celebration, an angry and jealous Rama hides in her room, refusing to join. Krishnakant finds her and angrily confronts his wife, calling her out on her refusal to accept Poonam despite her attempts throughout her life to win Rama's love. He informs Rama that she is the only person who has ever had a problem with Poonam.

Two days before the wedding, a fire breaks out at Mishra House. Although Poonam escapes in time, she realizes Rajni is still inside and saves her, but gets severely burnt in the process. The doctor informs her uncle that in such cases, even families disown their own. Upon hearing Poonam's diagnosis and the fact that she was injured saving Rajni, a remorseful Rama breaks down, realizing how cruel she has been to her niece. A heartbroken Bhagatji calls Prem right as he is leaving for Madhupur for the ceremony. Krishnakant reminisces about Poonam's childhood and, being emotional, is unable to sign the waiver allowing Poonam's surgery. Prem arrives, determined to marry Poonam despite her injuries, and he brings the finest doctors from Delhi. He marries her informally before her surgery. With the aid of the doctors from Delhi, the hospital successfully performs surgery on Poonam. In the end, Poonam and Prem traditionally marry each other.

== Cast ==
The cast is listed below:

- Shahid Kapoor as Prem Bajpayee
- Amrita Rao as Poonam "Bitto" Mishra Bajpayee
- Anupam Kher as Harishchandra Bajpayee, Prem and Sunil's father
- Alok Nath as Krishnakant Mishra, Poonam's uncle and Chhoti's father
- Seema Biswas as Rama Mishra, Krishnakant's wife and Chhoti's mother
- Samir Soni as Sunil Bajpayee, Prem's elder brother and Bhavna's husband
- Lata Sabharwal as Bhavna Bajpayee, Sunil's wife and Prem's sister-in-law
- Manoj Joshi as Bhagatji, Krishnakant's friend
- Amrita Prakash as Rajni "Chhoti" Mishra, Krishnakant and Rama's daughter
- Amey Pandya as Rahul, Sunil and Bhavna's son
- Dinesh Lamba as Munim
- Mohnish Bahl as Dr. Rashid Khan (extended cameo appearance)
- Yusuf Hussain in a friendly appearance as Dr. Jain

== Production ==
=== Development ===
Sooraj Barjatya noted that the story of Vivah is based upon a newspaper article his father read in 1988. Like in all of Barjatya's previous films, the male lead is named Prem. Later, he also took up the idea from Prabhat Roy's 2005 film Subhodrishti, the only Bengali film produced by Rajshri Productions. The story combined elements of Hindu tradition to set itself up as a film of cultural significance and was constructed differently than Barjatya's earlier films. He also introduced some changes to the film's storyline—for instance, he portrayed the female protagonist as ill, whereas in the original story, it was the male lead who was unwell. Barjatya hoped that the film would be remembered as the first to tackle the definitions and dynamics of a marriage. In an interview with Times of India Barjatya said, he kept in mind all the novels of Saratchandra Chatterjee while making Vivah. Barjatya felt that the film should possess a lyrical feel, since it was, according to him, "a lyrics oriented film."

=== Casting ===
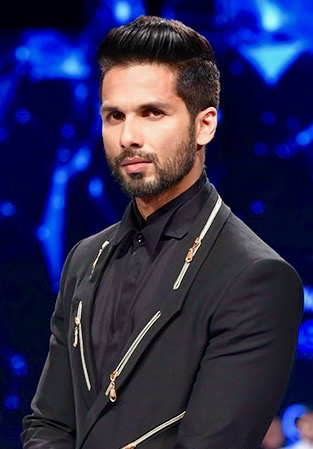
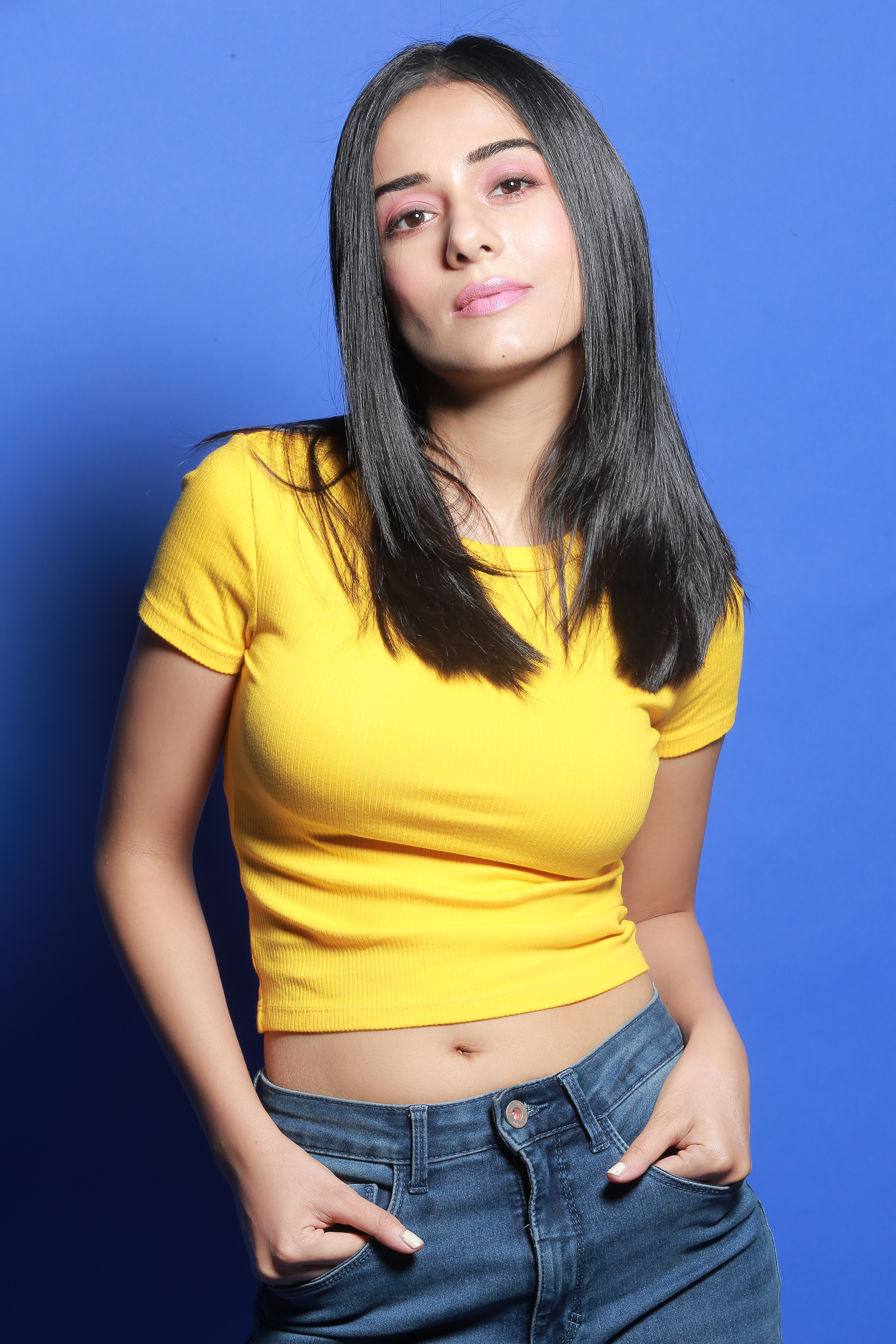
The film marks Kapoor and Rao 's fourth and final film collaboration till date.

Shahid Kapoor and Amrita Rao were cast as the leads Prem and Poonam. The film marks their fourth project together after Ishq Vishk (2003), Vaah! Life Ho Toh Aisi! (2005) and Shikhar (2005).

Kapoor played the soft-spoken and well-educated Prem. In an interview he stated that he had a tough time during the shoot and added, "I was a big city kid. I wasn't getting half the things that were happening. I just followed what Sooraj sir said and I did it with all my honesty." Rao played Poonam, a simple middle-class girl. She added, "I caught the sur of the character from Sooraj ji. I used to hear and see him very attentively, grab his sur and get into the character of Poonam. The challenge was to make her look simple without making her look fake."

Samir Soni was cast to play Kapoor's brother, Sunil. He added that Barjatya would explain scenes to everyone individually. Lata Sabharwal was cast as Bhavna opposite Soni. Anupam Kher, Alok Nath, Seema Biswas, Manoj Joshi and Amrita Prakash were cast in other prominent roles.

=== Filming ===
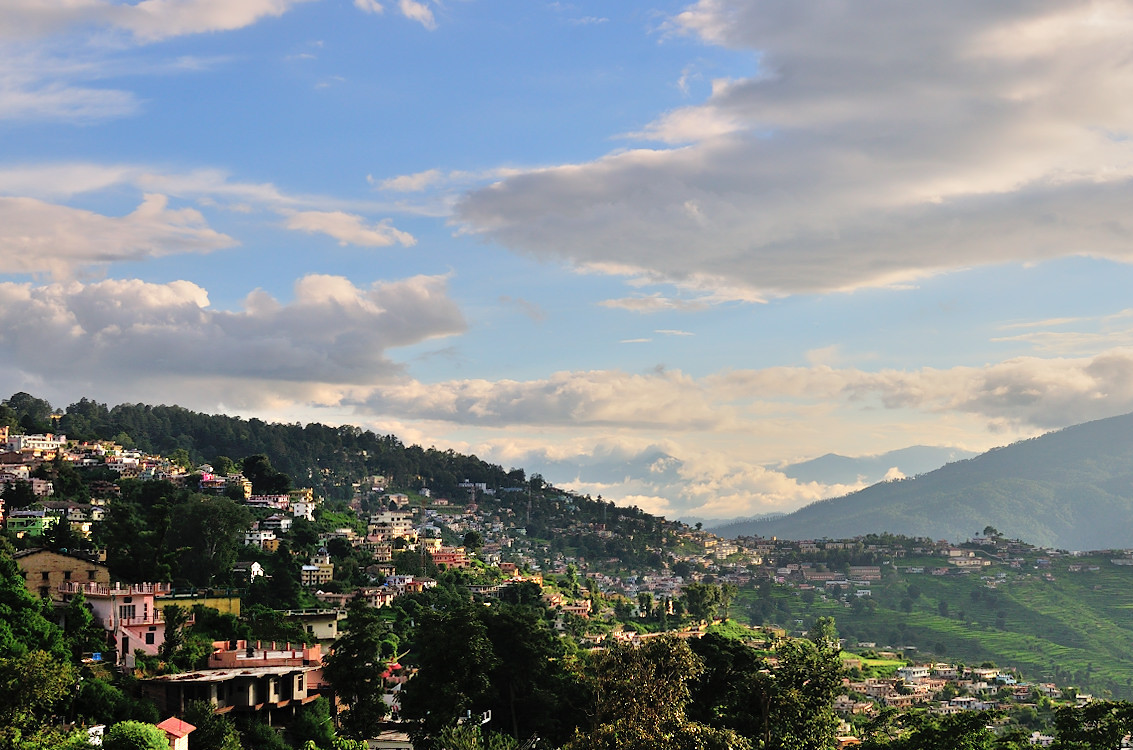
A major portion of the film was shot in Almora, Uttarakhand

Filming took place during the first months of 2006. The main hurdle came up with the location. Barjatya wanted to shoot film in an authentic way. He asked the film's art director Sanjay Dhobade to create the entire town of Madhupur that can give a realistic look, particularly portions where water leaking takes place and portions where spit marks were visible on the walls of the buildings in the film. Later, the town was created in Film city, Mumbai. Outdoor session of the film was done in Delhi, Lonavala, Ranikhet, Nainital and Almora.

=== Post-production ===
Additional production credits include: Jay Borade – dance choreographer, Sound — Jitendra Chaudhary, Dialogue — Aash Karan Atal, Cinematography — Harish Joshi and Editor — V N Mayekar. Amrita Rao's costumes were created by Indian designer Anna Singh and Shahid Kapoor's clothes were created by Shabina Khan. To promote the film, Shahid Kapoor and Amrita Rao sold tickets at the Fame Theatre in Malad, Mumbai.

== Soundtrack ==
Vivah

Soundtrack album by Ravindra Jain
- Released: 26 September 2006
- Genre: Film soundtrack
- Length: 34:46
- Label: Saregama
- Producer: Sooraj Barjatya

The soundtrack (songs and the background score) and lyrics for Vivah was scored by Ravindra Jain. Vivah was seventh collaboration of Ravindra Jain with Rajshri Productions. It was produced under the Saregama label. The composer primarily gave special importance to "taal" and opted to keep two "antras" followed by a "mukhra" in the songs. The orchestra combines with classical Indian instruments, like the sitar, sarod, violin, dholak and tabla to produce a blend between classical western and classical Indian music. The complete film soundtrack album was released on 26 September 2006.

Vivah (Original Motion Picture Soundtrack)
| No. | Title | Singer(s) | Length |
|---|---|---|---|
| 1. | "Mujhe Haq Hai" | Udit Narayan, Shreya Ghoshal | 5:02 |
| 2. | "Do Anjaane Ajnabi" | Udit Narayan, Shreya Ghoshal | 5:02 |
| 3. | "Milan Abhi Aadha Adhura Hai" | Udit Narayan, Shreya Ghoshal | 5:47 |
| 4. | "Hamari Shaadi Mein" | Babul Supriyo, Shreya Ghoshal | 5:17 |
| 5. | "O Jiji" | Pamela Jain, Shreya Ghoshal | 5:20 |
| 6. | "Savaiyaa — Raadhey Krishn Ki Jyoti" | Shreya Ghoshal | 2:16 |
| 7. | "Tere Dware Pe Aai Baraat" | Sudesh Bhonsle | 3:58 |
| 8. | "Kal Jisne Janam Yahan Paaya" | Suresh Wadkar, Kumar Sanu & Ravindra Jain | 7:43 |
| 9. | "Savaiyaa- Chhota Sa Saajan" | Suresh Wadkar | 1:21 |
| Total length: | | | 34:46 |

=== Critical reception ===
Although the songs were appreciated, the music was criticised due to its monotony choice of instruments and music arrangements being very similar to one another. Rediff.com wrote in its music review that, "Vivah's music disappoints".

== Reception ==
=== Box office ===
Vivah premiered on 10 November 2006 across India. Like Hum Aapke Hain Koun..! (1994), Rajshri Productions released limited number of prints for the film and eventually increased prints with increasing popularity. Early reviewers of Vivah predicted that it would be a huge disappointment. The film opened well and went on to become a commercially successful venture.

The film earned ₹222 crore (equivalent to ₹778 crore or US$81 million in 2026) net gross after seven weeks of running. Made on a budget of around ₹80 million (US$830,000), the film went on to collect ₹496 million (US$5.2 million) at the domestic box office. Vivah was released by Rajshri Media Limited on the production company's official site. The film's DVD was released by Rajshri Production.

=== Critical response ===
Deepa Gahlot of Sify said, "Vivah is far less offensive and far more watchable." Nikhat Kazmi from The Times of India called it a "simple documentation of something as banal as an engagement to a vivah".

Madhuparna Das of The Telegraph criticised Vivah for lacking plot, flat characters and mentioning that the story was "rather weak and improbable." BBC described Vivah as "a didactic, worthy, and highly sanitised take on reality in keeping with the Rajshri tradition." Rajeev Masand of CNN-IBN gave only 1 out of 5 stars and condemned the screenplay, calling both Kapoor and Rao "insipid and boring." A review carried by Anupama Chopra mentioned, "Sooraj Barjatya's fantasy world is carefully constructed, but his conviction infuses his films with an emotional heft."

== Awards and nominations ==
| Award | Date of ceremony (Note: Date is linked to the article about the awards held that year, wherever possible.) | Category | Recipient(s) | Result | Ref. |
|---|---|---|---|---|---|
| International Indian Film Academy Awards | 7–9 June 2007 | Best Film | Vivah | Nominated | |
| Screen Awards | 6 January 2007 | Best Actor | Shahid Kapoor | Nominated | |
| Screen Awards | 6 January 2007 | Best Actress | Amrita Rao | Nominated | |
| Screen Awards | 6 January 2007 | Best Supporting Actress | Seema Biswas | Nominated | |
| Screen Awards | 6 January 2007 | Jodi No. 1 | Shahid Kapoor & Amrita Rao | Nominated | |

== Legacy ==
Vivah remains one of the most popular cast ensemble film of Indian cinema. Kapoor and Rao's performance has been noted as one of their most notable works. Bollywood Hungama placed Kapoor and Rao in its list of the top 10 best romantic couples of the decade.

Indian painter M. F. Husain, decided to create a series of paintings inspired by Amrita Rao and Vivah. Husain planned to create an entire exhibition around her. He organised a private screening for 150 friends and press attendees to "convey his interest for the film" at Dubai's Plaza cinema. The Regent, a theater in Patna, Bihar, put up a festive banner to promote the movie. The banner reads Poonam weds Prem. Vivah inspired couples at that time to emulate the protagonists.
