= Screen Award for Best Actor (Popular Choice) =

Film award in India

The Screen Award for Best Actor - Popular Choice has been introduced in 2009 during the Screen Awards. Unlike the Screen Award for Best Actor which is chosen by the jury, this trophy is given by the viewers to the actor whose performance is judged the most popular. Akshay Kumar was the first winner for his performance in Singh Is Kinng in 2009 but he did not accept his award and gave it away to Aamir Khan for Ghajini who thought he deserved it more. Shah Rukh Khan has won five times (2011, 2012, 2014, 2015, 2016) in the last six years thus making him the most Awarded Actor.

== Winners ==
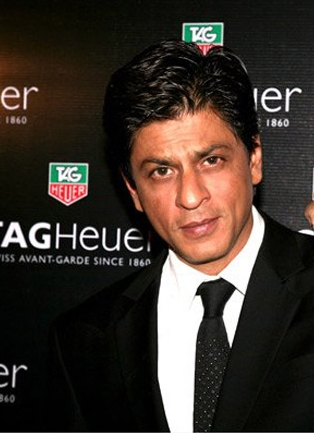
Shah Rukh Khan holds the record of maximum awards in the category, with five wins

Year	Actor	Film
2009	Akshay Kumar	Singh Is Kinng
2010	Shahid Kapoor	Kaminey
2011	Shah Rukh Khan	My Name Is Khan
2012	Shah Rukh Khan	Ra.One & Don 2
2013	Salman Khan	Dabangg 2
2014	Shah Rukh Khan	Chennai Express
2015	Shah Rukh Khan	Happy New Year
2016	Shah Rukh Khan	Dilwale

== See also ==
- Screen Awards
