= Producers Guild Film Award for Best Actor in a Leading Role =

Annual Indian film award

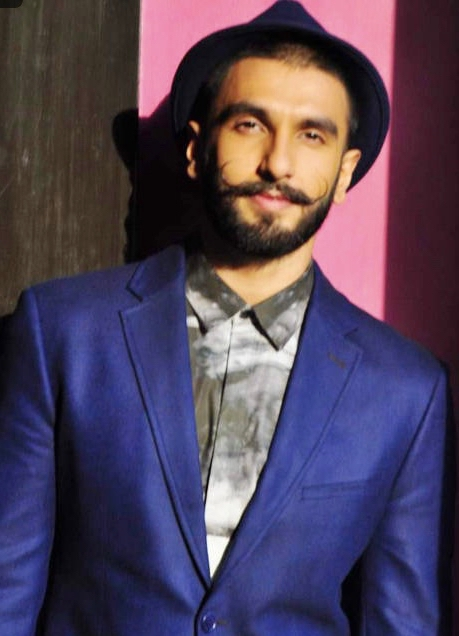
- 2016 Recipient Ranveer Singh
- Awarded for: Best Performance by an Actor in a Leading Role
- Country: India
- Presented by: Film & Television Producers Guild
- First award: 2004 (for performances in films released around 2003)
- Currently held by: Ranveer Singh, Bajirao Mastani (2016)
- Website: Producers Guild Film Awards

The Producers Guild Film Award for Best Actor in a Leading Role (previously known as the Apsara Award for Best Actor in a Leading Role) is given by the producers of the film and television guild as part of its annual award ceremony for Hindi films, to recognise a male actor who has delivered an outstanding performance in a leading role. Following its inception in 2004, no one was awarded in 2005 and 2007.

† - indicates the performance also won the Filmfare Award
‡ - indicates the performance was also nominated for the Filmfare Award

== Superlatives ==
Superlative	Best Actor in a Leading Role		Best Actor in a Supporting Role		Overall	
Actor with most awards	Hrithik Roshan; Shahrukh Khan; Ranbir Kapoor	2	--	--	Hrithik Roshan; Shahrukh Khan; Ranbir Kapoor	2
Actor with most nominations	Shahrukh Khan	7	Irrfan Khan; Naseeruddin Shah; Nawazuddin Siddiqui	3	Shahrukh Khan	7
Actor with most nominations (without ever winning)	Ajay Devgan	3	Naseeruddin Shah	3	Ajay Devgan; Naseeruddin Shah	4
Actor with most nominations in a single year	--	--	Rishi Kapoor (2010)	2	Rishi Kapoor (2010); Ajay Devgan (2011); Emraan Hashmi (2012); Nawazuddin Siddiqui (2013)	2

== Winners and nominees ==
=== 2000s ===
- 2004 Hrithik Roshan – Koi... Mil Gaya as Rohit Mehra †
  - Ajay Devgan – Gangaajal as SP Amit Kumar ‡
  - Amitabh Bachchan – Khakee as DCP Anant Kumar Shrivastav ‡
  - Sanjay Dutt – Munna Bhai M.B.B.S. as Murli Prasad Sharma a.k.a. Munna Bhai
  - Shahrukh Khan – Kal Ho Naa Ho as Aman Mathur ‡
- 2005 – No award
- 2006 Amitabh Bachchan – Black as Debraj Sahai †
  - Akshay Kumar – Waqt: The Race Against Time as Aditya Thakur
  - Anil Kapoor – No Entry as Kishen
  - Saif Ali Khan – Parineeta as Shekhar Rai ‡
  - Shahrukh Khan – Swades: We, the People as Mohan Bhargava †
- 2007 – No award
- 2008 Shahrukh Khan – Chak De! India as Kabir Khan †
  - Abhishek Bachchan – Guru as Gurukant Desai ‡
  - Akshaye Khanna – Gandhi, My Father as Harilal Gandhi
  - Amitabh Bachchan – Cheeni Kum as Buddhadev Gupta
  - Shahid Kapoor – Jab We Met as Aditya Kashyap ‡
- 2009 Hrithik Roshan – Jodhaa Akbar as Jalaluddin Mohammad Akbar †
  - Abhishek Bachchan – Dostana as Sameer "Sam" Acharya ‡
  - Akshay Kumar – Singh Is Kinng as Happy Singh ‡
  - Darsheel Safary – Taare Zameen Par as Ishaan Nandkishore Awasthi ‡
  - Naseeruddin Shah – A Wednesday! as Anonymous antagonist ‡

=== 2010s ===
- 2010 Shahrukh Khan – Rab Ne Bana Di Jodi as Surinder "Suri" Sahni/Raj Kapoor ‡
  - Aamir Khan – Ghajini as Sanjay Singhania
  - Ranbir Kapoor – Wake Up Sid as Sidharth "Sid" Mehra ‡
  - Saif Ali Khan – Love Aaj Kal as Jai Vardhan Singh/Veer Singh ‡
  - Shahid Kapoor – Kaminey as Charlie Sharma/Guddu Sharma ‡
- 2011 Salman Khan – Dabangg as Chulbul Pandey ‡
  - Ajay Devgan – Once Upon a Time in Mumbaai as Sultan Mirza ‡
  - Hrithik Roshan – Guzaarish as Ethan Mascarenhas ‡
  - Ranbir Kapoor – Raajneeti as Samar Pratap ‡
  - Shahrukh Khan – My Name Is Khan as Rizwan Khan †
- 2012 Ranbir Kapoor – Rockstar as Janardan Jhakhar / Jordan †
  - Ajay Devgan – Singham as Bajirao Singham ‡
  - Emraan Hashmi – Murder 2 as Arjun Bhagawat
  - Salman Khan – Bodyguard as Lovely Singh ‡
  - Shahrukh Khan – Don 2 as Don ‡
- 2013 Ranbir Kapoor – Barfi! as Murphy "Barfi" Johnson †
  - Ayushmann Khurrana – Vicky Donor as Vicky Arora
  - Hrithik Roshan – Agneepath as Vijay Deenanath Chauhan ‡
  - Irrfan Khan – Paan Singh Tomar as Paan Singh Tomar ‡
  - Manoj Bajpai – Gangs of Wasseypur as Sardar Khan ‡
  - Shahrukh Khan – Jab Tak Hai Jaan as Samar Anand ‡
- 2014 Farhan Akhtar – Bhaag Milkha Bhaag as Milkha Singh †
  - Irrfan Khan – The Lunchbox as Saajan Fernandez
  - Rajkummar Rao – Shahid as Shahid Azmi
  - Ranbir Kapoor – Yeh Jawaani Hai Deewani as Kabir "Bunny" Thapar ‡
  - Ranveer Singh – Goliyon Ki Raasleela Ram-Leela as Ram Rajari ‡
  - Sushant Singh Rajput – Kai Po Che! as Ishaan Bhatt
- 2015 Shahid Kapoor - Haider as Haider Meer
- 2016 Ranveer Singh - Bajirao Mastani as Peshwa Bajirao

== See also ==
- Producers Guild Film Awards
- Producers Guild Film Award for Best Actress in a Leading Role
