= Ishq Vishk =

2003 Indian film by Ken Ghosh

- DVD Cover
- Directed by: Ken Ghosh
- Screenplay by: Vinod Ranganathan
- Story by: Ken Ghosh
- Produced by: Kumar S. Taurani; Ramesh S. Taurani
- Starring: Shahid Kapoor; Amrita Rao; Shenaz Treasurywala; Vishal Malhotra
- Cinematography: Amit Roy
- Edited by: Ken Ghosh
- Music by: Songs: Anu Malik; Background Score: Raju Singh
- Production company: Tips Industries
- Distributed by: UTV Motion Pictures
- Release date: 9 May 2003
- Running time: 127 minutes
- Country: India
- Language: Hindi
- Budget: ₹50 million
- Box office: ₹122.63 million

Ishq Vishk (transl. Love etc.) is a 2003 Indian Hindi-language teen romantic comedy film directed by Ken Ghosh. The film stars debutant Shahid Kapoor, alongside Amrita Rao and Shenaz Treasurywala.

The film revolves around two childhood friends Rajiv (Kapoor) and Payal (Rao). As the two friends grow older, Payal eventually falls in love with Rajiv, though Rajiv is unaware of her feelings. The film emerged as a sleeper hit and launched both Kapoor and Rao's careers. The film was produced by Tips Industries and distributed by UTV Motion Pictures.

== Plot ==
College student Rajiv aspires to be among his college's popular students. Nonetheless, his friends Danny and Javed tease him as he does not have a girlfriend. Danny and Javed invite him to a vacation to Alibag. Rajiv's friend, Rocky, suggests that he date Payal for a short period and then break up with her as he does not have anyone to accompany him to the vacation. Nevertheless, Rocky helps Rajiv befriend Payal.

While declaring his love for Payal, who also happens to be his childhood friend, Rajiv asks her to become his girlfriend. Rajiv, however, does not believe in serious relationships and does this so that he could go on vacation. Payal reciprocates her love for Rajiv and reveals that she has been in love with him since their school days. On the day of the vacation, and after some persuasion, Payal is allowed by her father to go. The pair reside at Danny's beach house along with Danny, Javed, and their girlfriends. During her stay, Payal is mistreated by an intoxicated Rajiv, causing her to slap him in anger.

To her shock, she is upset when she learns that Rajiv does not love her. Danny and Javed's girlfriend attempt to explain to Payal that Rajiv wasn't at fault and that his behavior was caused by Danny. Payal apologies to Rajiv, though he refuses to forgive her and makes her kiss him to prove their love. Payal refuses, as she believes that such a gesture isn't necessary. The pair's relationship falls apart, and the two challenge each other to find better partners.

Following their breakup, Rajiv questions the possibility of dating the most attractive student in the college. Mambo, Rajiv's close friend, who had supported the pair's relationship, demands that he and Payal reconcile. Some time later, a new student, Alisha, enrolls at the college. Rocky encourages Rajiv to woo her, and he manages to win her over. Mambo consoles Payal and promises to be there for her, and the two become close. Despite the breakup, a deeply hurt Payal still has feelings for Rajiv.

Despite seeing Rajiv and Alisha together, she continues to stay in contact with Rajiv, even wishing him on his birthday. Rajiv is annoyed after seeing that Payal had wished him first, rather than Alisha, as she was busy with a modelling shoot. Rajiv becomes irritated after seeing Payal and Mambo becoming close. When Payal shows up for Rajiv's birthday party, she becomes emotional and confesses to Rajiv that their love was never real, which is why Rajiv was happy with Alisha and not with her.

Upon seeing this, Mambo and Rajiv get into a heated argument over Payal, causing Alisha to strongly dislike Payal. Alisha learns from a friend that Payal and Rajiv are childhood friends and have always been in love with each other. She confronts Payal and accuses her of stealing Rajiv from her. When Mambo tries to defend her, he is mocked by Alisha, infuriating him. Rajiv accuses Mambo of seducing Payal, causing the two to part ways. Rajiv cannot stop thinking about Payal and how she continued to care for him, even after their breakup. Insecure Alisha endlessly asks Rajiv to declare his love for her. Thinking of Alisha as Payal, he hugs and expresses his love for Payal when he is actually hugging Alisha.

At the college farewell party, Rajiv apologizes to Mambo, and they reconcile. He realizes that Mambo and Payal are not actually in love and attempts to win back Payal. Rajiv attempts to apologize to Payal, but she ignores him and pushes him away. Rajiv publicly apologies to Payal; he expresses his love for her. Payal, who is still upset with him, tells him that nothing is going to change her mind, no matter what he does. Rajiv approaches her and pleads with her. Payal finally forgives Rajiv after seeing his determination. Alisha arrives at the party, and after seeing Rajiv and Payal dancing, she realizes that only Rajiv and Payal can be with each other. She apologizes to Payal for her mistreatment of her and conveys her regards to the pair.

== Cast ==
- Shahid Kapoor as Rajiv Mathur
- Amrita Rao as Payal Mehra
- Shenaz Treasurywala as Alisha Sahay
- Yash Tonk as Rocky Dutt
- Satish Shah as Mr. Vikas Mathur
- Vishal Malhotra as Mambo
- Pawan Shankar as Sandip Varma
- Upasna Singh as Kamlabai
- Neelima Azeem as Mrs. Ayesha Mathur
- Vivek Vaswani as a Professor
- Omung Kumar as Host (special appearance)
- Anang Desai as Mr. Mehra, Payal's Father
- Kapil Jhaveri as Javed
- Deepti Gujral as Dolly

== Box office ==
According to Box Office India, the film collected approximately ₹122.63 million on a budget of ₹50 million and was a moderate success.

== Awards ==
49th Filmfare Awards:

=== Won ===
- Best Male Debut – Shahid Kapoor

=== Nominated ===
- Best Supporting Actress – Shenaz Treasurywala
- Best Female Playback Singer – Alisha Chinai for "Chot Dil Pe Lagi"

== Soundtrack ==
Ishq Vishk

Soundtrack album by Anu Malik
- Released: April 2003
- Genre: Film soundtrack
- Label: Tips Music Films
- Producer: Anu Malik

Anu Malik chronology
Khushi (2003)	Ishq Vishk (2003)	Main Prem Ki Diwani Hoon (2003)

Professional ratings
Review scores
Source	Rating
India FM	link

The film's music was composed by Anu Malik. Lyrics were penned by Sameer. According to the Indian trade website Box Office India, with around 1,200,000 units sold, this film's soundtrack album was the year's eleventh highest-selling.

=== Track listing ===
All lyrics are written by Sameer.

No.	Title	Singer(s)	Length
1.	"Aankhon Ne Tumhari"	Alka Yagnik, Kumar Sanu	05:36
2.	"Aisa Kyun Hota Hai"	Alka Yagnik	04:54
3.	"Chot Dil Pe Lagi"	Alisha Chinai, Kumar Sanu	05:34
4.	"Dooba Re Dooba"	Alka Yagnik, Sonu Nigam	04:09
5.	"Ishq Vishk Pyaar Vyaar"	Alka Yagnik, Kumar Sanu	04:56
6.	"Kaun Hai Woh"	Alisha Chinai, Udit Narayan	04:25
7.	"Love Love Tum Karo"	Sonu Nigam	05:41
8.	"Mujhpe Har Haseena"	Alisha Chinai, Kumar Sanu, Sonu Nigam	04:40
9.	"Mujhse Huee Bas Yeh"	Alka Yagnik	01:51
10.	"Theme Piece"	Alka Yagnik, Sonu Nigam	01:34

== Sequel ==
A spiritual sequel titled Ishq Vishk Rebound, directed by Nipun Dharmadhikari has been announced. It stars Rohit Saraf, Jibraan Khan, Pashmina Roshan and Naila Grrewal.
