= Mausam (2011 film) =

2011 Indian film by Pankaj Kapur

- Theatrical release poster
- Directed by: Pankaj Kapur
- Screenplay by: Pankaj Kapur
- Produced by: Madhu Mantena; Sheetal Vinod Talwar
- Starring: Shahid Kapoor; Sonam Kapoor; Shayan Munshi; Anupam Kher
- Cinematography: Binod Pradhan
- Edited by: A. Sreekar Prasad
- Music by: Pritam
- Production companies: Vistaar Religare Film Fund; Cinergy
- Distributed by: Eros International Media Ltd.
- Release date: 23 September 2011
- Running time: 168 minutes
- Country: India
- Language: Hindi

Mausam (transl. Season) is a 2011 Indian Hindi-language war romantic drama film written and directed by Pankaj Kapur under the Vistaar Religare Film Fund banner. The film stars Shahid Kapoor of Jab We Met (2007) and Kismat Konnection (2008) fame opposite Sonam Kapoor. The film was originally scheduled to release on 16 September 2011, but due to the delay in obtaining the NOC from the Indian Air Force, it was pushed back farther by a week, releasing on 23 September 2011.

== Plot ==
The main story of the film spans over a period of 10 years, from 1992 to 2002, and includes references to the Demolition of Babri Masjid, Bombay riots, 1993 Bombay bombings, Kargil War, 9/11 attacks, and 2002 Gujarat violence.

Mausam is the story of two lovers, Harinder Singh, known as Harry and Aayat. Harry is a happy-go-lucky Punjabi guy whereas Aayat is a Kashmiri girl.

In 1992, Aayat and her Bua (aunt) Fatima escaped from Kashmir due to the insurgency. Aayat's mother is murdered by the militants, thus forcing her father Ghulam Rasool (Kamal Chopra) and her Chacha Maharaj Kishan to send her along with her aunt to Mallukot.

In Mallukot, Aayat meets Harinder 'Harry' Singh. Harry is the son of a college professor. He and his friends are popular locals who spend their days goofing around. A Mallukot girl named Rajjo, however, nurses a deep crush on Harry, but he constantly rejects her. But when Harry meets Aayat for the first time, he is instantly smitten and falls in love with her. Aayat initially is hesitant but later reciprocates his love. They both grow close during the preparations for Pammo's (Harry's elder sister) wedding. Pammo marries Mahinder Pal 'MP' Singh, Harry's friend from London. However, after hearing the news of the demolition of the Babri Masjid the following day, Aayat and her family fled to Mumbai. Aayat does not inform Harry before leaving, making him heartbroken. Meanwhile, Harry gets selected in the Indian Air Force, and he also leaves Mallukot for NDA.

In 1999, Harry and Aayat again meet in Edinburgh, Scotland. Aayat has been staying there for the past seven years, after losing her relative in the 1993 Bombay bombings, and Harry, now a squadron leader, has been sent there by the Indian Air Force on a special assignment. In Edinburgh, they again grow closer, prompting Aayat's family to fix her marriage with Harry. Aayat later invites Harry over to her place.

On the day of the visit, however, the Kargil War breaks out, and Harry is immediately recalled to India. On arrival, Harry is posted with a Mirage 2000 Squadron in Jodhpur. Meanwhile, Aayat's father passes away, forcing her entire family to relocate from London back to Mallukot. Aayat and Harry both try to contact each other but fail.

Harry is later deployed to the Adampur Air Base (Gwalior Air Base in reality), where he is attached to No. 7 Squadron "Battleaxes." Aayat goes to Ahmedabad and from there returns to Edinburgh, Scotland.

In order to dislodge the enemy from Tiger Hill, the Indian Air Force resorts to heavy aerial bombardment. Harry is selected to lead a special bombing mission over Tiger Hill. The mission is successful, but Harry's aircraft malfunctions, causing him to crash land. Harry's left arm becomes semi-paralyzed, requiring two months to recover.

Aayat, meanwhile, has left Scotland. She stays with Akram, a family friend's son, in New York, while her aunt has returned to Ahmedabad. Two months later, while Harry is in Switzerland for the birth of his nephew, he is convinced by Pammo not to let go of Aayat. He goes in search of her and realizes that she is in New York. However, while travelling in a train in Switzerland, Harry spots Aayat with Akram and his son. Mistakenly believing that Aayat is married, he begins to feel that all hope is lost and decides to completely forget her.

Terrorists destroy the World Trade Center on 11 September 2001. As a result of these attacks, there is a sudden surge in hate crimes against Muslims in the USA and Europe, prompting Akram and Aayat to return to Ahmedabad. Coincidentally, Harry is also in Ahmedabad for his friend's wedding. Aayat decides to forget Harry and marry Akram. However, in 2002, when the wedding is about to take place, Ahmedabad is engulfed in riots. Aayat runs for her safety and is saved by Harry, who is also hiding. Harry and Aayat wait until the rioters leave, but they are accidentally spotted and attacked. Harry and Aayat run into a blazing fire, where they rescue a horse and a baby girl. Aayat laments their fate, but Harry convinces her to forget the past and see the brighter future.

In the epilogue, it is revealed that Harry and Aayat get married, they adopt the baby girl, and they themselves are expecting a child.

== Cast ==
- Shahid Kapoor as Squadron Leader Harinder "Harry" Singh - Jab We Met (2007) and Kismat Konnection (2008)
- Sonam Kapoor as Aayat Rasool/Aayat Harinder Singh
- Anupam Kher as Maharaj Kishan
- Supriya Pathak as Fatima
- Shayan Munshi as Yasin
- Kamal Chopra as Ghulam Rasool, Ayaat's father
- Maya Mankotia as Pamela (Pammo), Harry's sister
- Kamal Tiwari as Prof. Sadprakash Singh (Bauji), Harry's father
- Harry Tangri as Katar Mahindar Pral Singh (MP), Pammo's fiancé, then husband
- Aditi Sharma as Rajjo
- Surjit Singh Dhami as Darji
- Arvinder Singh Bhatti as Dr. Balvinder Singh
- Manoj Pahwa as Gulzari
- Jass Bhatia as Kartar
- Maninder Velli as Deepa
- Amandeep Singh as Jeeta
- Vaibhav Talwar as Akram
- Lorna Anderson as Maria
- Ankit Mohan as Flt Lt Ashfaq Hussain
- Rahul Vohra as Flt Lt T.N. Ayyar
- Wamiqa Gabbi as Lala Durgadas's daughter

== Production ==
In early August 2010, Nawman Malik claimed that the title Mausam is registered under his name and filed a complaint with the Association of Motion Pictures and TV Programme Producers. He was also claiming that the story of Mausam is his. Now, Mallik has moved the Mumbai High Court asking for an injunction against producer Sheetal Talwar and director Pankaj Kapur for using the title. He has demanded a compensation of Rs 10 million for the title and has submitted a digital film called Mausam, which he claims he made.

The film was shot primarily in Edinburgh and India while the Air Force scenes were shot at the Gwalior Air Force Base. The shooting took two years to complete, and part of the delay was caused by Sonam Kapoor's illness during the shoot.

In September, the film was denied submission for censorship because the Air Force had objected to a 30-second long aerial action sequence with Shahid Kapoor who plays an Air Force pilot in Mausam. Special permission had been sought and granted to shoot in a real airbase. The Air Force were objecting to a dramatic action fight sequence with Shahid on board a Mirage fighter plane. Mausam producer Sheetal Talwar announced: "We had the script cleared by the Air Force on August 23, 2010. Now suddenly they're objecting to a sequence after it's been shot, edited and the film was ready for censoring?". The satellite rights of this movie were distributed by the hindi general entertainment channel Sahara One for ₹1 crore (equivalent to ₹2.2 crore or US$230,000 in 2026).

== Release ==
=== Critical reception ===
Zee News bureau gave the film 4 stars saying "‘Mausam’ can be best described as a wonderful blend of offbeat and mainstream cinema which is full of charm, elegance and vivacity." Nikhat Kazmi of The Times Of India rated it three out of five saying "The film tries to strike a balance between art and mainstream cinema and succeeds partially." Saibal Chatterjee of NDTV gave it 3 stars out of 5. Taran Adarsh of Bollywood Hungama gave the film 4 stars out of 5, saying that, "On the whole, Mausam is a slow movie!" but praises the Shahid Kapoor's performance saying "Shahid gives his all to this role, submitting himself to his director-father to mould him the way he chooses to. It won't be erroneous to state that Shahid surpasses all his previous performances, including the one in Kaminey, with this film. The film also marks the coming of age of this actor." Rajeev Masand of CNN-IBN rated the movie 2 out of 5, saying, "Director Pankaj Kapur infuses his story and his characters with a delicate, old-fashioned charm that is pleasing and quaint at first, but gets progressively exhausting when logic goes out of the window"

=== Box office ===
The film made with the budget of Rs. 380 million, opened good at the box office but collections fell on after a week at release of force and the film grossed Rs. 316 million in India. It collected Rs. 450 million (US $5.6 million) gross in its first week and ended its lifetime collections with ₹740 million (US$7.7 million) gross worldwide. The film was declared a flop at box office.

== Soundtrack ==
The music of the film was composed by Pritam, while the lyrics were penned by Irshad Kamil.

There are two other songs which were seen in the movie, but were not released. One of them is sung by Sonu Nigam and Shreya Ghoshal and is a romantic track by Pritam "Zara Si Mehndi"; the other is sung by Shreya Ghoshal, a romantic track "Abhi Na Jao Chhod Kar", adapted from the 1961 Hindi film Hum Dono.

== Accolades ==
Award Ceremony	Category	Recipient	Result	Ref.(s)
4th Mirchi Music Awards	Male Vocalist of The Year	Hans Raj Hans – "Ik Tu Hi Tu Hi"	Nominated	
4th Mirchi Music Awards	Upcoming Male Vocalist of The Year	Shahid Mallya – "Rabba Main Toh Mar Gaya Oye"	Nominated	
4th Mirchi Music Awards	Song representing Sufi tradition	"Rabba Main Toh Mar Gaya Oye"	Nominated	
