= Shahid Kapoor =

Indian actor (born 1981)

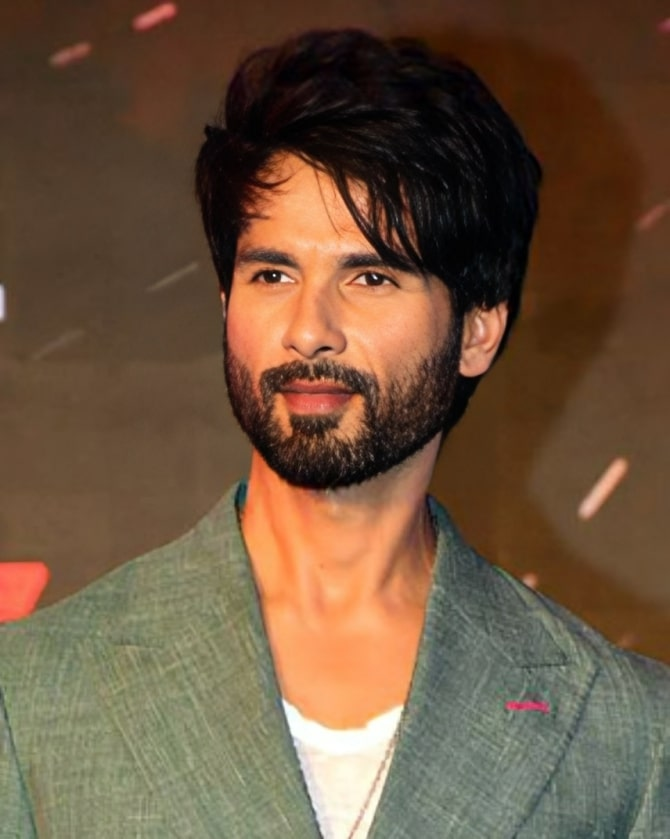
- Kapoor in 2023
- Born: Shahid Pankaj Kapoor; 25 February 1981 (age 45); New Delhi, India
- Occupation: Actor
- Years active: 2003–present
- Works: Full list
- Spouse: Mira Rajput (m. 2015)
- Children: 2
- Parents: Pankaj Kapur (father); Neelima Azeem (mother)
- Relatives: Kapoor family
- Awards: Full list

Shahid Pankaj Kapoor (pronounced [ʃaːɦɪd̪ kəˈpuːr]; born 25 February 1981) is an Indian actor who works in Hindi films. Initially recognised for portraying romantic roles, he has since taken on parts in action films and thrillers. One of the highest-paid Indian actors, he has featured in Forbes India's Celebrity 100 list since 2012. Kapoor is the recipient of several awards, including three Filmfare Awards.

The son of actors Pankaj Kapur and Neelima Azeem, Kapoor trained as a dancer at Shiamak Davar's academy. He appeared as a background dancer in a few films of the 1990s, and featured in music videos and television commercials. He made his film debut in 2003 with a leading role in the romantic comedy Ishq Vishk, a sleeper hit for which he won the Filmfare Award for Best Male Debut. He followed it with roles in several commercial failures before starring in Sooraj Barjatya's top-grossing family drama Vivah (2006).

Kapoor earned praise for playing a troubled businessman in Imtiaz Ali's romantic comedy Jab We Met (2007) and twin brothers in Vishal Bhardwaj's action film Kaminey (2009). Further acclaim came for portraying the Hamlet character in Bhardwaj's tragedy Haider (2014) and a drug abusing singer in the crime drama Udta Punjab (2016). For the former, he won the Filmfare Award for Best Actor and for the latter, he won the Filmfare Critics Award for Best Actor. Kapoor's highest-grossing releases came with the period drama Padmaavat (2018) and the romantic drama Kabir Singh (2019). He has since starred in the crime drama series Farzi (2023) and the romantic comedy Teri Baaton Mein Aisa Uljha Jiya (2024).

In addition to acting, Kapoor supports charities, hosts award ceremonies, and has featured as a talent judge on the dance reality show Jhalak Dikhhla Jaa Reloaded (2015). He is married to Mira Rajput, with whom he has two children.

== Early life and background ==
Shahid Pankaj Kapoor was born in New Delhi on 25 February 1981 to actor Pankaj Kapur and actor-dancer Neelima Azeem. On his mother's side, he is related to filmmaker and author Khwaja Ahmad Abbas. His parents divorced when he was three years old; his father shifted to Mumbai (and married the actress Supriya Pathak) and Kapoor continued living in Delhi with his mother and maternal grandparents. His grandparents were journalists for the Soviet magazine Sputnik, mostly translating works from Urdu into Russian, and Kapoor was particularly fond of his grandfather: "He would walk me to school every single day. He would talk to me about Dad, with whom he shared a great relationship, and read out his letters to me." His father, who was then a struggling actor in Mumbai, would visit Kapoor only once a year on his birthday. When Kapoor was 10, his mother, who was working as a dancer, moved to Mumbai to work as an actress.

In Mumbai, Azeem went on to marry the actor Rajesh Khattar. Kapoor continued living with his mother and Khattar, until they separated in 2001. He has a maternal half-brother, Ishaan Khatter, from his mother's marriage to Khattar. From his father's marriage to Pathak, he has two paternal half-siblings, Sanah and Ruhaan. Kapoor was educated at the Gyan Bharati School in Delhi and Rajhans Vidyalaya in Mumbai. He later attended Mumbai's Mithibai College for three years.

Kapoor was interested in dance from an early age, and at the age of 15, he joined Shiamak Davar's dance institute. As a student there, Kapoor appeared as a background dancer in the films Dil To Pagal Hai (1997) and Taal (1999), in which Davar served as choreographer. During a stage show at the institute, Kapoor performed in the songs "Vogue" and "GoldenEye" to a positive response from the audience; he described the experience as the first time that he "felt like a star". He later became an instructor at the institute. During this time, Kapoor accompanied a friend to an audition for a Pepsi commercial featuring the stars Shah Rukh Khan, Kajol and Rani Mukerji, but wound up with the part himself. He appeared in television commercials for the brands Kit Kat and Close-Up, among others, and featured in music videos for several performers, including the band Aryans and the singer Kumar Sanu. Kapoor also took on the job of an assistant director to his father on the 1998 television series Mohandas B.A.L.L.B.

== Career ==
=== Early work and breakthrough (2003–2006) ===
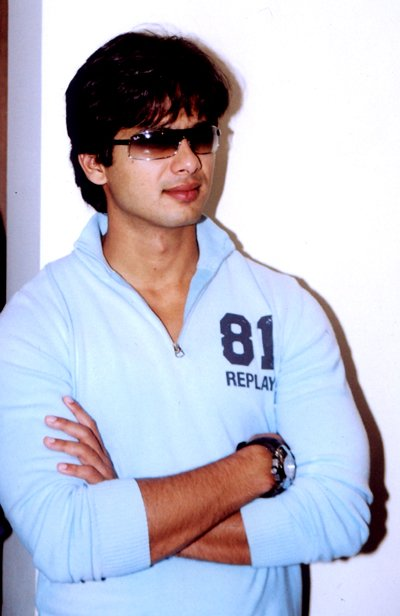
Kapoor in 2004

Having noticed Kapoor in the Aryans' music video "Aankhon Mein", producer Ramesh Taurani was keen to cast him in a film. However, upon meeting him, Taurani thought Kapoor, who was 20 years old at the time, to be too young and underweight to become an actor, and encouraged him to wait for a few years. Kapoor, meanwhile, turned down a lead role in N. Chandra's sex comedy Style in hopes of working with Taurani. Taurani found a suitable project for Kapoor in the teenage romance Ishq Vishk (2003), which Ken Ghosh was directing for his company. Kapoor, who trained extensively for a bulkier physical build, was eventually hired. Before beginning work on the film, he attended acting workshops with Naseeruddin Shah and Satyadev Dubey.

Ishq Vishk tells the story of Rajiv Mathur (Kapoor), a high-school student who engages in a romantic affair with two classmates of contrasting personalities (played by Amrita Rao and Shenaz Treasurywala). Kapoor was attracted to the idea of playing an unlikable lead since it was a departure from the traditional portrayal of teenage heroes in Indian films. Writing for The Hindu, the critic Ziya Us Salam did not find him to be "hero material", adding that "boyhood seems to have overstayed on his face – but he is not necessarily bad in the acting department." The film, however, proved to be a sleeper hit at the box office and won Kapoor the Filmfare Award for Best Male Debut.

Following his debut, Kapoor reunited with Taurani and Ghosh in a film he considered to be drastically different from Ishq Vishk. The thriller Fida (2004) featured him as a love-struck student who is manipulated by a woman (Kareena Kapoor) and her lover (Fardeen Khan) to rob a bank. Despite criticising the film, Rama Sharma of The Tribune wrote that Kapoor "shines in his role. He looks fresh. As an impulsive emotional and innocent guy, who is sucked into crime because of these very qualities, he manages to evoke your sympathies." Later that year, Kapoor appeared in the romantic comedy Dil Maange More in which he was paired opposite three women: Soha Ali Khan, Tulip Joshi, and Ayesha Takia. Patcy N of Rediff.com praised his dancing skills but was wary of his imitation of Shah Rukh Khan's acting style. Both his 2004 releases were commercially unsuccessful.

The series of poorly received films continued in 2005, when all three of Kapoor's films failed at the box office. His first two releases that year were the comedies Deewane Huye Paagal and Vaah! Life Ho Toh Aisi!, both of which were largely panned. The former was plagiarised from the Hollywood film There's Something About Mary in which Kapoor played one of Rimi Sen's love interests; the critic Khalid Mohamed found Kapoor to be "the only likeable element in this travesty" but Namrata Joshi of Outlook labelled him "colourless" and criticised his pairing with Sen. His final role was that of a righteous teenager drawn towards a life of indulgence in John Matthew Matthan's drama Shikhar, co-starring Ajay Devgan, Bipasha Basu and Amrita Rao. The critic Sukanya Verma found Kapoor to be miscast as a village boy in the film, but noted that he was "never short of spontaneity and youthful exuberance".

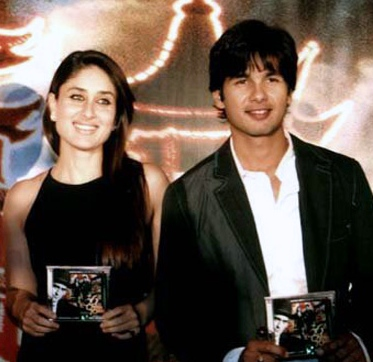
Shahid and Kareena Kapoor at the audio launch of 36 China Town in 2006

In 2006, Kapoor played opposite Kareena Kapoor in two films—the thriller 36 China Town and the comedy Chup Chup Ke. In 36 China Town, a murder mystery from the director duo Abbas–Mustan, Kapoor starred as one of the seven suspects in the murder of an heiress, and in the Priyadarshan-directed Chup Chup Ke, he played a depressed man who pretends to be deaf and mute. The former was his first commercial success since Ishq Vishk. Greater success came to Kapoor later that year when he starred alongside Amrita Rao in Sooraj Barjatya's romantic drama Vivah, a film depicting an arranged marriage. Made on a shoestring budget of ₹100 million (US$1.0 million), the film earned over ₹530 million (US$5.5 million) worldwide, and proved to be Kapoor's highest-grossing film to that point. Reviews of the film, however, were negative; Raja Sen termed the film a "nightmare" and wrote that Kapoor "isn't offensively bad, doesn't ham it up like crazy, or speak in a weird accent. Having said that, he isn't an actor at all, standing around working on his boyish grin, simply chewing up the scenery. No screen presence at all."

=== Jab We Met, Kaminey, and commercial fluctuations (2007–2013) ===
Kapoor found no success in his first release of 2007—the ensemble comedy Fool & Final. However, his second release that year, the Imtiaz Ali-directed romantic comedy Jab We Met proved to be one of the top-grossing films of the year. The film tells the story of a troubled businessman (Kapoor) whose life undergoes a series of changes after he encounters a loquacious girl (Kareena Kapoor) on a train ride. Ali thought that Kapoor's previous roles failed to justify his acting potential, and thus approached him to portray a more complex character. The BBC noted on how "endearing" he was in the film and Rajeev Masand wrote that he left an "indelible impression with a performance that is understated and mature" in a film he thought primarily belonged to Kareena Kapoor. For his performance, Kapoor received his first nomination for the Filmfare Award for Best Actor.

After featuring opposite Vidya Balan in the romantic comedy Kismat Konnection (2008), Kapoor played twin brothers, one with a lisp and the other with a stutter, in Vishal Bhardwaj's critically acclaimed action film Kaminey (2009). In preparation, Kapoor met speech specialists and researched on the medical and mental aspects of the two conditions. To create a lean physique for one of the brothers, a look he considered to be "radically different" from his personal appearance, Kapoor practised functional training and followed a rigorous diet. Writing for Variety, critic Joe Leydon reviewed that Kapoor "impressively displays sufficiently variegated degrees of emotional intensity to sustain the illusion of two distinct characters. Just as important, he provides each sibling an appropriately elevated hunkiness quotient." Rediff.com listed Kapoor's performance as the best by a Bollywood actor in 2009 and he received a second Best Actor nomination at Filmfare. Kaminey earned over ₹700 million (US$7.3 million) worldwide. Kapoor's final release of 2009 was as a cricketer in the Yash Raj Films production Dil Bole Hadippa!, a romantic comedy co-starring Rani Mukerji. It was screened at the Toronto International Film Festival, but was a financial failure.

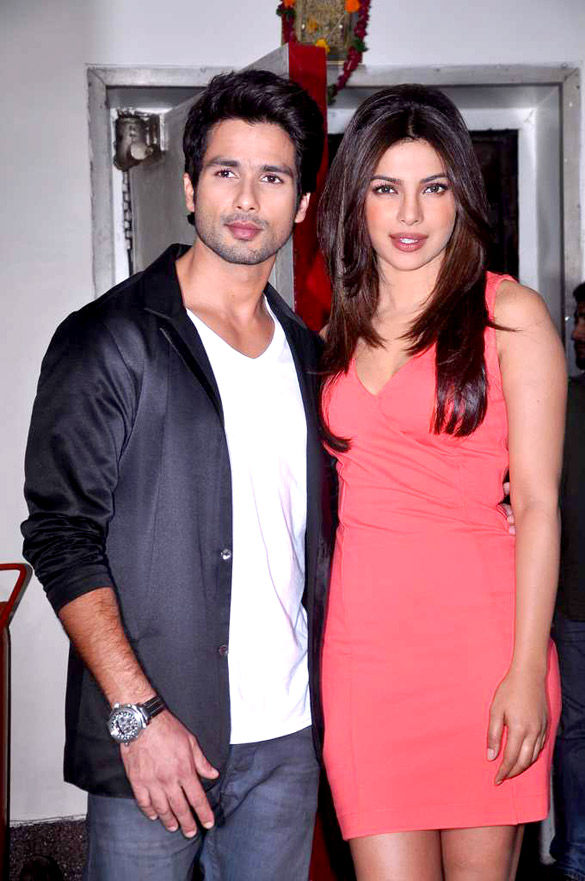
Kapoor and co-star Priyanka Chopra promoting Teri Meri Kahaani in 2012

In 2010, Kapoor reteamed with Ken Ghosh in Chance Pe Dance opposite Genelia D'Souza, a comedy-drama about a struggling actor, in which Kapoor's performance was described as "uneven" by Aniruddha Guha of Daily News and Analysis. He had a supporting role in Paathshaala, a drama about the education system in India, starring Nana Patekar, following which he reunited with Yash Raj Films on the comedy-drama Badmaash Company, which follows a group of overambitious youngsters who become con men. Rachel Saltz of The New York Times praised Kapoor's look in the film, though Tushar Joshi of Mid-Day thought that he was miscast. Kapoor's fourth and final release that year was Satish Kaushik's romantic comedy Milenge Milenge, which marked his fourth collaboration with Kareena Kapoor. Plagiarised from the Hollywood film Serendipity, the production was delayed since 2005. During its production in December 2004 at Phuket, Kapoor requested a delay in filming to attend the premiere of Dil Maange More. The delay may have saved the lives of the crew, since the hotel booked for them was destroyed during the 2004 Indian Ocean tsunami. With the exception of Badmaash Company, none of these films performed well commercially.

Kapoor next appeared in his father's directorial Mausam (2011); co-starring Sonam Kapoor, the star-crossed romance set over a decade, took two years to complete. Considering the film to be his "dream project", Kapoor did not take on additional work while filming for it. For his role as an unambitious village boy who becomes an air force pilot, Kapoor trained to fly the F-16 Fighting Falcon. Rajeev Masand reviewed that "while he doesn't quite cut it as a convincing IAF pilot, Shahid Kapoor is terrific as the small-town brat". The film was a box office flop and Kapoor was later regretful for spending so much time on the project.

The following year, Kapoor took on another romantic role in Kunal Kohli's Teri Meri Kahaani (2012), co-starring Priyanka Chopra. It tells the story of a pair of star-crossed lovers who are reincarnated in three different eras. Filmfare reviewed that "Shahid and Priyanka give it their best shot, but their charm doesn't make up for the absence of a genuine kahani [story]". It was commercially unsuccessful. The comedy Phata Poster Nikhla Hero opposite Ileana D'Cruz, from director Rajkumar Santoshi was Kapoor's first release of 2013. His role was that of Vishwas Rao, a struggling actor who masquerades as a policeman. Critical reviews on the film were negative, though Kapoor's performance was praised. As with his last few releases, the film earned little at the box office leading trade analysts to question his commercial appeal. This changed later that year, when he starred in Prabhu Deva's action film R... Rajkumar; despite a negative critical reception, the film earned over ₹995 million (US$10 million) worldwide, becoming Kapoor's highest-grossing release to that point. In a scathing review, Saibal Chatterjee of NDTV called the film a "massive mess" and wrote that Kapoor "ends up looking more moronic than macho" in it. Kapoor suffered from burn injuries on his back and hands while filming a stunt sequence in R... Rajkumar.

=== Established actor and film controversies (2014–2019) ===
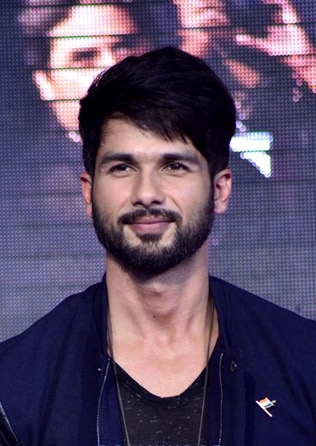
Kapoor promoting Haider in 2014. He won the Filmfare Award for Best Actor for the film.

Kapoor next reunited with director Vishal Bhardwaj to film Haider (2014), an adaptation of William Shakespeare's tragedy Hamlet set during the Kashmir conflict of 1995, in which he played the titular role opposite Tabu and Shraddha Kapoor. Kapoor described the film as the "toughest" of his career, and waived his fees to star in it. For the role, he shaved his head and learned to speak in a Kashmiri dialect. Haider garnered critical acclaim, though was controversial among Indian nationalists for its portrayal of the conflict in Kashmir. Sanjukta Sharma of Mint found the film to be an "immensely effective reimagination of Shakespeare" and particularly praised Kapoor for playing his part with "impressive zest and inventiveness". Writing for Hindustan Times, critic Anupama Chopra wrote that Kapoor initially seemed uncomfortable in the complex central role, but added that he "slowly [...] comes to inhabit Haider, veering from rage to jealousy to madness in a heartbeat." Kapoor won several awards for the role, including the Screen Award, Producers Guild Film Award and Filmfare Award for Best Actor. Haider emerged a box office success.

After completing the duties of a talent judge on the dance reality show Jhalak Dikhhla Jaa Reloaded, Kapoor appeared opposite Alia Bhatt in Vikas Bahl's Shaandaar (2015). A critical and commercial failure, it is about insomniacs who fall in love during a destination wedding. Kapoor next took on the role of a drug abusing rock star in Udta Punjab (2016), a crime drama from the director Abhishek Chaubey that documents the substance abuse endemic in the Indian state of Punjab. Kapoor, a teetotaler, found it challenging to play an addict. He based the role on several pop stars, and was interested in bringing out his character's vulnerability despite his obnoxious actions. Udta Punjab generated controversy when the Central Board of Film Certification (CBFC) demanded extensive censorship before its theatrical release, citing that the portrayal of Punjab in it was negative. The demands sparked a debate on freedom of expression in India. After the producers filed a lawsuit against the board, the Bombay High Court cleared it for exhibition with a single scene cut, in which Kapoor's character is shown urinating on people. Sukanya Verma took note of the film's anti-drug message; she considered Kapoor to be "spectacularly unbridled" in his part and added that "the believability he brings to his complex transition while preserving his inherent flakiness deserves all the praise". Kapoor won the Filmfare Critics Award for Best Actor (shared with Manoj Bajpayee for Aligarh) and received a Best Actor nomination at the same ceremony. A commercial success, it became Kapoor's largest-opening film at that time.

In his third collaboration with Vishal Bharadwaj, an epic romance set during World War II entitled Rangoon (2017), Kapoor played the part of a taciturn soldier who develops a romance with a film actress (played by Kangana Ranaut). Filming was marred by a reported feud between Ranaut and Kapoor, and although they denied the reports, both stars publicly commented against the other. The film received mixed reviews; Rajeev Masand termed the film "overlong, indulgent to the point of exhaustion", but praised Kapoor for playing his part with "remarkable maturity". In addition, Uday Bhatia of Mint was appreciative of the chemistry between Ranaut and Kapoor. Rangoon failed to recoup its ₹610 million (US$6.3 million) investment.

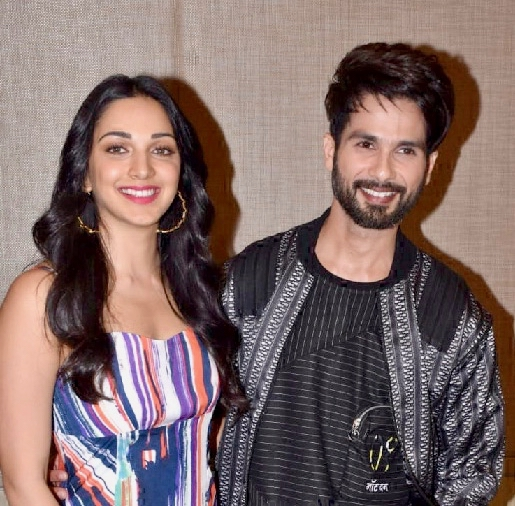
Kapoor and his co-star Kiara Advani at an event for Kabir Singh in 2019

Kapoor next played Rawal Ratan Singh, a 14th-century Rajput ruler, in Sanjay Leela Bhansali's period drama Padmaavat (2018), co-starring Deepika Padukone and Ranveer Singh. Amid violent protests by right-wing Hindu groups, who speculated that the film distorted historical facts, it was cleared for release by the CBFC after several modifications were made. Ankur Pathak of HuffPost was disappointed in the film's adherence to regressive patriarchal mores and criticised Kapoor for being "a bit too stiff and robotic". Padmaavat had a production budget of ₹2 billion (US$21 million), making it the most expensive Hindi film ever made. With a worldwide gross of ₹5.45 billion (US$57 million), it ranks among the highest-grossing Indian films of all time and is the biggest success of Kapoor's career. Later that year, he starred in Batti Gul Meter Chalu, a social problem film about electricity issues in rural India, for which he learnt the Garhwali dialect. Filming was temporarily suspended when its production company, KriArj Entertainment, failed to remunerate the crew, and resumed after Bhushan Kumar took over the project. Saibal Chatterjee reviewed, "Kapoor, working within a screenplay that is undercooked and confused, tries his very best to make the best of a bad deal but is unable to pack any real power". The film had average box office returns.

In 2019, Kapoor starred in Kabir Singh, a remake of the Telugu romantic drama Arjun Reddy (2017), in which he played a self-destructive alcoholic pining for his ex-girlfriend. He found it challenging to distance himself from the part, and feared bringing home the experience to his wife and children. For scenes in which he played a college student, he lost 14 kg. Writing for The Indian Express, Shubhra Gupta criticised the film's misogynistic themes and found Kapoor to be "too old for this role, and his dissolution never feels as sharply realized as the one he managed so superbly in Udta Punjab". Even so, it earned over ₹3.7 billion (US$38 million) worldwide to emerge as the second highest-grossing Hindi film of the year and Kapoor's biggest commercial success in which he played the sole male lead. He received another Best Actor nomination at Filmfare.

=== Action films and streaming projects (2020–present) ===
After a three-year absence from the screen, Kapoor starred in the sports drama Jersey (2022), a remake of the Telugu film of the same name, about a former cricketer who wants to make a comeback in his late 30s. While filming for a cricket sequence, he suffered an injury to his forehead that needed 13 stitches. Production and release of the film was delayed several times due to the COVID-19 pandemic. He was praised by Archika Khurana of The Times of India for his credibility as a cricketer. It did not perform well at the box office.

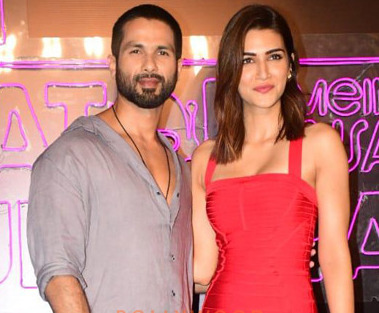
Kapoor and Kriti Sanon at an event for Teri Baaton Mein Aisa Uljha Jiya in 2024

Kapoor was first offered a starring role in Farzi, a crime drama film from the filmmaking duo Raj & DK, in 2014. By the end of the decade, it was expanded into a streaming series (a format Kapoor was keen to explore), and was released on Amazon Prime Video in 2023. He played Sunny, a disillusioned artist who decides to make counterfeit money. Scroll.in's Nandini Ramnath found Kapoor to be in "fine form despite looking too old for the part", adding that he "reins in his tendency for self-pitying bombast to deliver a performance that complements Sunny’s vanity for equating counterfeiting with art". Eager to work in an intense action film, Kapoor accepted Ali Abbas Zafar's offer to star in Bloody Daddy (2023), a remake of the French film Sleepless Night (2011). It was filmed in 36 days amid the COVID-19 pandemic. The film was digitally released on JioCinema to avoid the pitfalls of censorship in a theatrical release. Reviewers for NDTV and Rediff.com deemed the film and Kapoor's performance "adequate" and "serviceable". Both Farzi and Bloody Daddy had strong viewership, with the former becoming the most-watched Indian streaming series ever.

Keen to do a light-hearted role after a series of intense parts, Kapoor signed on to the romantic comedy Teri Baaton Mein Aisa Uljha Jiya (2024), in which he starred as a man who falls in love with a humanoid robot (played by Kriti Sanon). WION's Shomini Sen found it a "middling performance" by his own high standards. It emerged as a commercial success. In the following year, Kapoor played Dev Ambre, a boorish cop, in Rosshan Andrrews' action thriller Deva, a remake of Andrrews's Malayalam film Mumbai Police (2013). Kapoor wrongly claimed during the films' promotions that it was not a remake, and it eventually had poor box-office returns. Commentators noted similarities between his roles in Deva and Kabir Singh, including Firstpost's Vinamra Mathur, who wrote that despite an "earnest" performance, Kapoor had overplayed his character's hypermasculinity.

Continuing his work in action films, Kapoor reteamed with Bhardwaj for the romantic action film O'Romeo (2026), an adaptation of Sapna Didi's segment from Hussain Zaidi's novel Mafia Queens of Mumbai. Having recently undergone major hip surgery, Kapoor found performing the film's action sequences particularly challenging. Despite the film's ambivalent reception, his performance as Ustara, a violent gang leader was positively received. Tanmayi Savadi of Times Now described him as "lethal and brilliant," in a role where he "sharpens the already edgy character with his swag, madness and passion". Later that year, Kapoor starred alongside Sanon and Rashmika Mandanna in Cocktail 2, in which the three portrayed friends caught in a love triangle. Critics found Kapoor to be the standout among the trio, though some felt he was playing to type. Both O'Romeo and Cocktail 2 were unable to recoup their high production budgets.

== Off-screen work ==
In addition to acting in films, Kapoor performs on stage and hosts award ceremonies. In 2006, he participated in a world tour, entitled RockStars, in which he performed alongside Kareena Kapoor, John Abraham, Salman Khan and three other celebrities. From 2010–12, Kapoor has co-hosted three Screen Awards ceremonies with Shah Rukh Khan, and from 2012–14 he co-hosted three International Indian Film Academy Awards with either Khan or Farhan Akhtar.

He also supports charitable organisations for various causes. In 2010, he took part in a charity event named Superstars Ka Jalwa, which helped generate money for the employees of the Cine and Television Artists Association (CINTAA). Also that year, he lent his support to the NGO Swayamsiddh, which helps children with special needs. The following year, he adopted three villages in support of NDTV's Greenathon, an initiative to support environmental consciousness and improve electricity supplies to rural areas. In 2012, Kapoor helped revive the Victory Arts Foundation NGO, founded by Shiamak Davar, which helps underprivileged children through dance therapy programs. Also that year, he appeared alongside other Bollywood celebrities in Because My World Is Not The Same, a short film by Zoya Akhtar, to generate awareness on breast cancer. He supports the People for the Ethical Treatment of Animals organisation through advertisement campaigns. In 2023, Kapoor performed in Doha for the "Entertainer No. 1" tour, alongside Varun Dhawan, Tiger Shroff, Kiara Advani, Rakul Preet Singh, Jacqueline Fernandez and Ash King.

== Personal life ==
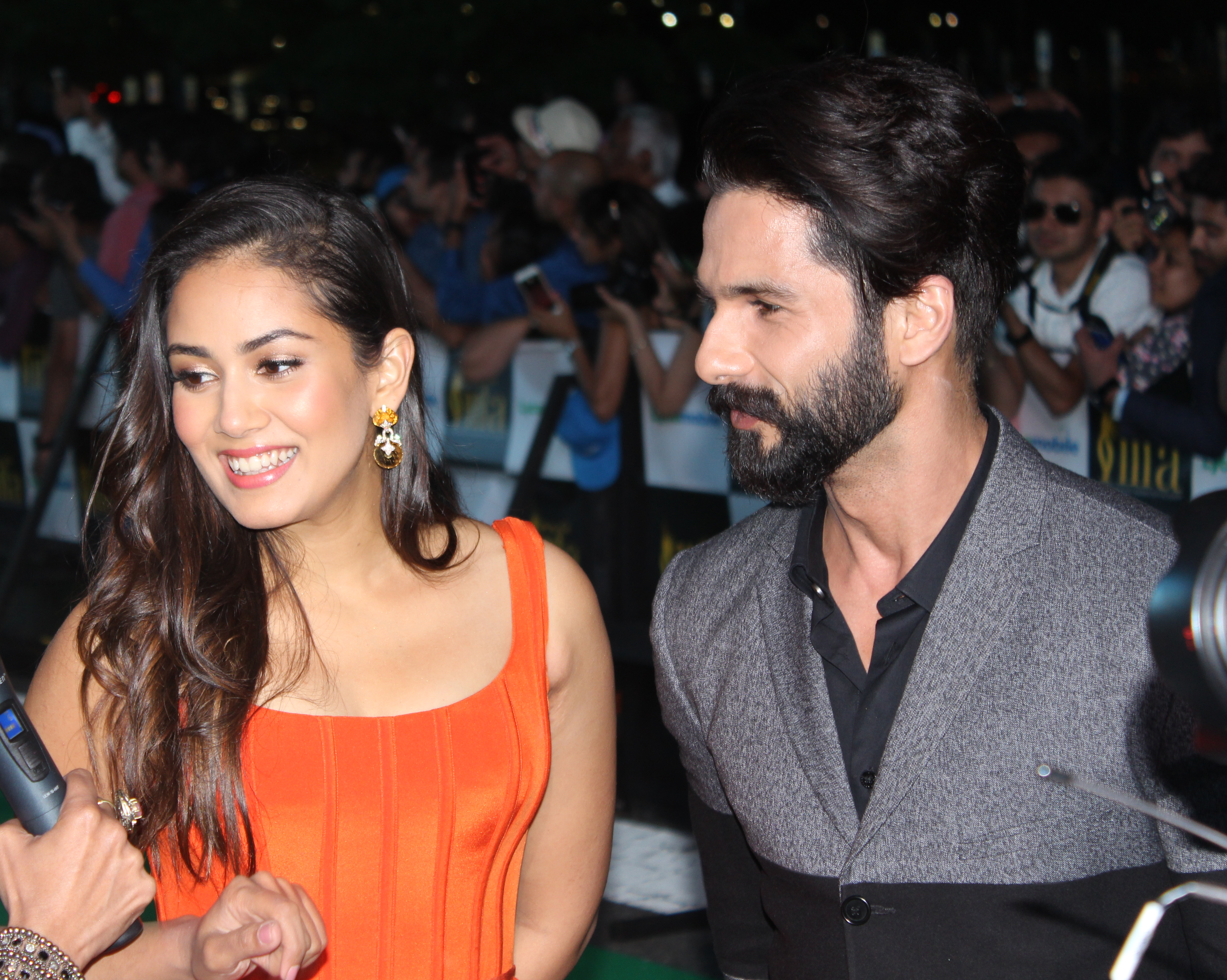
Kapoor and his wife, Mira Rajput, in 2017

Kapoor's personal life is the subject of fervent tabloid reporting in India. During the filming of Fida in 2004, he began dating Kareena Kapoor and they both publicly spoke of the relationship. They were involved in a well-publicised scandal when Mid Day published a set of pictures of them kissing in public. Despite claims by the couple that the pictures were fabricated, the newspaper denied any wrongdoing. The couple separated in 2007 during the filming of Jab We Met. Since their split, Kapoor decided to keep his personal life away from media attention. However, tabloids speculated on his relationship with several other actresses, including Vidya Balan and Priyanka Chopra. In 2012, Kapoor lodged a police complaint of stalking against former actress Vastavikta Pandit.

In March 2015, Kapoor spoke of his impending marriage to Mira Rajput, a university student from New Delhi, who is 13 years his junior. The Times of India reported that Kapoor met Rajput through the religious group Radha Soami Satsang Beas. The couple married at a private ceremony in Gurgaon on 7 July 2015, and Rajput gave birth to their daughter Misha in August 2016 and their son Zain in September 2018.

Having met his wife through the Radha Soami, Kapoor also spiritually identifies with its teachings, the Radha Soami being a modern syncretist religious group combining elements from both Hinduism and Sikhism. Kapoor practices vegetarianism, and credits the author Brian Hines' book Life is Fair for influencing this lifestyle choice.

== Artistry and public image ==
The journalist Dave Besseling of GQ, in 2014, described Kapoor as "friendly, chirpy, affable frat-boy type. Someone you'd want to play video games with on a Sunday, but keep the hell away from your sister". However, certain media publications have labelled Kapoor a recluse and described him as arrogant and temperamental. Vickey Lalwani of Mumbai Mirror wrote in 2012 that this perceived media image hindered certain filmmakers from approaching him for roles. Addressing this image, Kapoor remarked, "I just don't socialise much, I don't party too much, I don't know what to say to the media if I'm not talking about a film that I am doing, so yeah, maybe I am perceived as a snob."

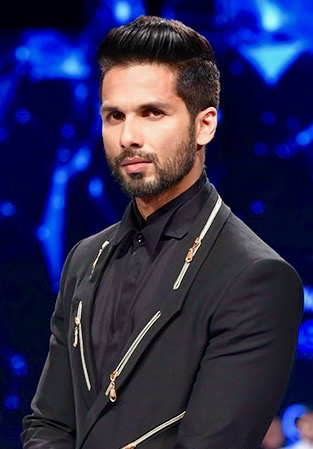
Kapoor at an event for GQ in 2017

Analysing his career, the entertainment portal Bollywood Hungama published that his "boy next door persona" was initially perceived by critics as a weakness, but credited him for turning it into a trademark. Jitesh Pillai of Filmfare wrote that after gaining recognition in urban romantic roles, Kapoor defied typecasting by taking on diverse parts in crime dramas and action films. He noted that Kapoor's refusal to be "slotted under any kind of tag" led to a fluctuating career trajectory. Following the success of Jab We Met (2007) and Kaminey (2009), Kapoor's career went through a decline; he described the phase as a series of "wrong choices" and said that taking on a challenging role in Haider (2014) helped him reinvent himself. Sonal Gera of The Indian Express opined that the film established him in Bollywood. In her book Power of a Common Man, the author Koral Dasgupta writes that Kapoor does not "[conform] to any fixed rules of the trade", and notes that despite having a lopsided success ratio at the box office, he remains popular among the audiences.

Considered one of the most attractive and stylish male celebrities in India, he regularly features in the British magazine Eastern Eye's listing of the "50 Sexiest Asian Men in the World". In 2012 and 2013 he was ranked fourth, and in 2017 he topped the list. He was ranked fifth on The Times of India's list of the 50 most-desirable men in 2014; he was placed among the top 10 in 2012, 2013 and 2015. Kapoor was named the sexiest vegetarian man of India and Asia-Pacific in 2009 and 2011, respectively, by PETA. One of the highest-paid actors in Bollywood, from 2012–15, 2017, and 2019, he featured among the top 50 in the Indian edition of the Forbes' "Celebrity 100", a list based on the income and popularity of India's celebrities. He peaked at the 15th position in 2015 with an estimated annual income of ₹148.8 million (US$1.5 million).

A popular celebrity, Kapoor has a significant following on Twitter and Instagram. Kapoor has appeared in Rediff's annual listing of "Best Bollywood Actors", several times. He topped the list in 2009, and was subsequently placed 8th in 2007, and 5th in 2016 and 2022. He was further placed 7th in its "Best OTT Actors" list of 2023. He was placed 4th in Filmfare's poll of the "Most Stylish Young Actor", in 2013. Noted for his dancing skills, he is considered among Bollywood's best dancers. Kapoor is the celebrity ambassador for several brands and products, including Samsung, Elf Aquitaine and Colgate. In 2019, his wax figure was unveiled at Madame Tussauds Singapore. In 2024, Kapoor was placed 34th on IMDb's List of 100 Most Viewed Indian Stars. As of 2024, Kapoor is among India's highest tax-paying celebrities.

== Accolades ==
Kapoor has been the recipient of three Filmfare Awards: Best Male Debut for Ishq Vishk (2003), Best Actor for Haider (2014), and Critics Award for Best Actor for Udta Punjab (2016). He has received four more Best Actor nominations at the ceremony for Jab We Met (2007), Kaminey (2009), Udta Punjab (2016), and Kabir Singh (2019).
