= List of Hindi films of 2022 =

This is a list of Hindi films that were released in 2022.

== Box office collection ==
The highest-grossing Hindi films released in 2022, by worldwide box office gross revenue, are as follows.

#	Implies that the film is multilingual and the gross collection figure includes the worldwide collection of the other simultaneously filmed version.

Highest worldwide gross of 2022
Rank	Title	Production company	Distributor	Worldwide gross	Ref.
1	Brahmāstra: Part One – Shiva	Star Studios; Dharma Productions; Prime Focus; Magic Wand Films	Walt Disney Studios Motion Pictures	₹435 crore (US$55.34 million)	
2	Drishyam 2	T-Series Films; Viacom18 Studios; Panorama Studios	Panorama Studios; Yash Raj Films	₹345.05 crore (US$43.9 million)	
3	The Kashmir Files	Zee Studios; Abhishek Agarwal Arts; I Am Buddha	Zee Studios	₹340.92 crore (US$43.37 million)	
4	Bhool Bhulaiyaa 2	T-Series Films; Cine1 Studios	AA Films	₹266.88 crore (US$33.95 million)	
5	Gangubai Kathiawadi	Pen Studios; Bhansali Productions	Pen Marudhar Entertainment	₹209.77 crore (US$26.69 million)	
6	Radhe Shyam (Note: Bilingual film, also released in Telugu)	T-Series Films; UV Creations	AA Films; Red Giant Movies; RD Illuminations	₹200.00 crore (US$25.44 million) #	(Note: News18 said that the collection was ₹200 crore. The Times of India and India Today said that the collection was ₹214.04 crore. While, MensXP reported that the collection was ₹300–350 crore.)
7	Jugjugg Jeeyo	Viacom18 Studios; Dharma Productions	Viacom18 Studios	₹136.13 crore (US$17.32 million)	
8	Vikram Vedha	T-Series Films; Reliance Entertainment; YNOT Studios; Friday Filmworks	PVR Pictures; Pen Murudhar; Home Screen Entertainment	₹135.03 crore (US$17.18 million)	
9	Laal Singh Chaddha	Viacom18 Studios; Aamir Khan Productions	Paramount Pictures	₹129.64 crore (US$16.49 million)	
10	Ram Setu	Amazon Studios; Cape of Good Films; Lyca Productions; Abundantia Entertainment	Zee Studios	₹94.45 crore (equivalent to ₹101 crore or US$10 million in 2026)	

== January–March ==
Opening		Title	Director	Cast	Studio (production house)	Ref.
J A N	21	36 Farmhouse	Ram Ramesh Sharm	Vijay Raaz; Sanjay Mishra; Amol Parashar; Barkha Singh; Ashwini Kalsekar	Mukta Arts, ZEE5	
J A N	26	Hai Tujhe Salaam India	Avanish Kumar	Aarya Babbar; Ajaz Khan; Smita Gondkar; Kanwalpreet Singh; Salamn Bhatt	Redwood Productions	
F E B	4	Looop Lapeta	Aakash Bhatia	Taapsee Pannu; Tahir Raj Bhasin	Sony Pictures India, Ellipsis Entertainment, Netflix	
F E B	11	Gehraiyaan	Shakun Batra	Deepika Padukone; Siddhant Chaturvedi; Ananya Panday; Dhairya Karwa	Viacom18 Studios, Dharma Productions, Jouska Films, Amazon Prime Video,	
F E B	11	Badhaai Do	Harshavardhan Kulkarni	Rajkummar Rao; Bhumi Pednekar	Junglee Pictures	
F E B	17	A Thursday	Behzad Khambata	Yami Gautam; Neha Dhupia; Atul Kulkarni; Dimple Kapadia	RSVP Movies, Blue Monkey Films, Disney+ Hotstar	
F E B	25	Gangubai Kathiawadi	Sanjay Leela Bhansali	Alia Bhatt; Ajay Devgn; Shantanu Maheshwari; Vijay Raaz; Seema Pahwa; Varun Kapoor	Pen Studios, Bhansali Productions	
F E B	25	Love Hostel	Shanker Raman	Sanya Malhotra; Vikrant Massey; Bobby Deol	Red Chillies Entertainment, Drishyam Films, ZEE5	
M A R	4	Jhund	Nagraj Manjule	Amitabh Bachchan; Akash Thosar; Rinku Rajguru	T-Series Films, Tandav Film Entertainment, Cloud 9 Pictures, Aatpaat Films	
M A R	4	Toolsidas Junior	Mridul	Sanjay Dutt; Rajiv Kapoor; Varun Buddhadev	T-Series Films, Ashutosh Gowariker Productions	
M A R	11	Radhe Shyam	Radha Krishna Kumar	Prabhas; Pooja Hegde	T-Series Films, UV Creations	
M A R	11	The Kashmir Files	Vivek Agnihotri	Mithun Chakraborty; Anupam Kher; Darshan Kumar; Pallavi Joshi; Chinmay Mandlekar	Zee Studios, Abhishek Agarwal Arts, I Am Buddha Production	
M A R	18	Bachchhan Paandey	Farhad Samji	Akshay Kumar; Kriti Sanon; Jacqueline Fernandez; Arshad Warsi	Nadiadwala Grandson Entertainment	
M A R	18	Jalsa	Suresh Triveni	Vidya Balan; Shefali Shah	T-Series Films, Abundantia Entertainment, Amazon Prime Video	
M A R	31	Sharmaji Namkeen	Hitesh Bhatia	Rishi Kapoor; Paresh Rawal; Juhi Chawla	Excel Entertainment, MacGuffin Pictures, Amazon Prime Video	

== April–June ==
Opening		Title	Director	Cast	Studio (production house)	Ref.
A P R	1	Attack: Part 1	Lakshya Raj Anand	John Abraham; Jacqueline Fernandez; Rakul Preet Singh	Pen Studios, JA Entertainment, Ajay Kapoor Productions	
A P R	1	Kaun Pravin Tambe?	Jayprad Desai	Shreyas Talpade	Fox Star Studios, Friday Filmworks, Bootroom Sports, Disney+ Hotstar	
A P R	2	Cobalt Blue	Sachin Kundalkar	Prateik Babbar; Neelay Mehendale; Anjali Sivaraman; Neil Bhoopalam; Anant V Joshi; Poornima Indrajith	Open Air Films, Netflix	
A P R	7	Dasvi	Tushar Jalota	Abhishek Bachchan; Yami Gautam; Nimrat Kaur	Jio Studios, Maddock Films, Bake My Cake Films, Netflix, JioCinema	
A P R	8	Hurdang	Nikhil Nagesh Bhat	Sunny Kaushal; Nushrratt Bharuccha; Vijay Varma	T-Series Films, Karma Media and Entertainment	
A P R	22	Jersey	Gowtam Tinnanuri	Shahid Kapoor; Mrunal Thakur; Pankaj Kapur	Allu Entertainment, Dil Raju Production, Sithara Entertainments, Brat Films	
A P R	22	Operation Romeo	Shashant Shah	Sidhant Gupta; Vedika Pinto; Sharad Kelkar; Bhumika Chawla; Kishor Kadam	Reliance Entertainment, Friday Filmworks, Plan C Studios	
A P R	29	Runway 34	Ajay Devgn	Amitabh Bachchan; Ajay Devgn; Rakul Preet Singh; Boman Irani	Bombay Stencil, Good Karma Films, White Falcon Films, Ajay Devgn FFilms	
A P R	29	Heropanti 2	Ahmed Khan	Tiger Shroff; Nawazuddin Siddiqui; Tara Sutaria	Nadiadwala Grandson Entertainment	
M A Y	6	Mere Desh Ki Dharti	Faraz Haider	Divyenndu; Anupriya Goenka; Anant Vidhaat; Inaamulhaq; Brijendra Kala	Carnival Motion Pictures	
M A Y	6	Thar	Raj Singh Chaudhary	Anil Kapoor; Harshvardhan Kapoor; Fatima Sana Shaikh	Anil Kapoor Film & Communication Network, Netflix	
M A Y	13	Jayeshbhai Jordaar	Divyang Thakkar	Ranveer Singh; Shalini Pandey; Boman Irani; Ratna Pathak Shah	Yash Raj Films	
M A Y	20	Bhool Bhulaiyaa 2	Anees Bazmee	Kartik Aaryan; Tabu; Kiara Advani	T-Series Films, Cine1 Studios	
M A Y	20	Dhaakad	Razy Ghai	Kangana Ranaut; Arjun Rampal; Divya Dutta	Soham Rockstar Entertainment, Sohel Maklai Productions, Asylum Films	
M A Y	27	Anek	Anubhav Sinha	Ayushmann Khurrana	T-Series Films, Benaras Media Works	
M A Y	27	Love In Ukraine	Nitin Kumar Gupta	Vipin Kaushik; Anastasia	Neole Films, Kamal Entertainment	
M A Y	27	Dehati Disco	Manoj Sharma	Ganesh Acharya; Ravi Kishan; Manoj Joshi; Rajesh Sharma; Remo D'Souza	Panorama Studios, Qureshi Productions, One Entertainment Film Productions, V2S Entertainment, AA Prachi Movies	
M A Y	27	Haemolymph	Sudarshan Gamare	Riyaz Anwar; Ruchira Jadhav; Rohit Kokate; Neelam Kulkarni	Ticket Bari Productions, AB Films Entertainment, Adiman Films, ND9 Studios	
J U N	3	Samrat Prithviraj	Chandraprakash Dwivedi	Akshay Kumar; Sanjay Dutt; Sonu Sood; Manushi Chhillar	Yash Raj Films	
J U N	3	Major	Sashi Kiran Tikka	Adivi Sesh; Sobhita Dhulipala; Saiee Manjrekar; Prakash Raj; Revathi	Sony Pictures India, G. Mahesh Babu Entertainment, A+S Movies	
J U N	10	Janhit Mein Jaari	Jai Basantu Singh	Nushrratt Bharuccha	Bhanushali Studios, Think Ink Picturez, Shree Raghav Entertainment, Take 9 Entertainment	
J U N	10	Ardh	Palash Muchhal	Rajpal Yadav; Rubina Dilaik	Pal Music & Films, ZEE5	
J U N	17	Nikamma	Sabbir Khan	Abhimanyu Dassani; Shirley Setia; Shilpa Shetty	Sony Pictures India, Sabbir Khan Films	
J U N	24	Sherdil	Srijit Mukherji	Pankaj Tripathi; Neeraj Kabi; Sayani Gupta	T-Series Films, Reliance Entertainment	
J U N	24	Jugjugg Jeeyo	Raj Mehta	Anil Kapoor; Neetu Kapoor; Varun Dhawan; Kiara Advani; Prajakta Koli; Manish Paul	Viacom18 Studios, Dharma Productions	
J U N	24	Forensic	Vishal Furia	Vikrant Massey; Radhika Apte; Prachi Desai; Rohit Roy	Soham Rockstar Entertainment, Mini Films, ZEE5	

== July–September ==
Opening		Title	Director	Cast	Studio (production house)	Ref.
J U L	1	Rashtra Kavach Om	Kapil Verma	Aditya Roy Kapur; Sanjana Sanghi; Ashutosh Rana	Zee Studios, Paper Doll Entertainment	
J U L	1	Rocketry: The Nambi Effect (Note: Trilingual film, also released in English and Tamil)	R. Madhavan	R. Madhavan; Simran	Tricolour Films, Varghese Moolans Pictures, 27th Entertainment, Vijay Moolan Talkies	
J U L	8	Khuda Haafiz: Chapter 2 – Agni Pariksha	Faruk Kabir	Vidyut Jammwal; Shivaleeka Oberoi	Zee Studios, Panorama Studios, Action Hero Films, Cinergy	
J U L	15	HIT: The First Case	Shailesh Kolanu	Rajkummar Rao; Sanya Malhotra	T-Series Films, Dil Raju Production	
J U L	15	Ladki: Dragon Girl	Ram Gopal Varma	Pooja Bhalekar; Abhimanyu Singh	Artsee Media Production	
J U L	15	Jaadugar	Sameer Saxena	Jitendra Kumar; Jaaved Jaaferi; Aarushi Sharma	Posham PA Pictures, Chalkboard Entertainment, Netflix	
J U L	15	Judaa Hoke Bhi	Vikram Bhatt	Akshay Oberoi; Aindrita Ray; Meherzan Mazda	Studio Virtual Worlds, K Sera Sera Box Office, Loneranger Productions, Houseful Motion Pictures	
J U L	15	Shabaash Mithu	Srijit Mukherji	Taapsee Pannu	Viacom18 Studios, Colosceum Media	
J U L	22	RK/RKay	Rajat Kapoor	Rajat Kapoor; Mallika Sherawat; Kubbra Sait; Ranvir Shorey; Manu Rishi	Nflicks, Mithya Talkies, Priyanshi Films	
J U L	22	Shamshera	Karan Malhotra	Ranbir Kapoor; Sanjay Dutt; Vaani Kapoor	Yash Raj Films	
J U L	29	Ek Villain Returns	Mohit Suri	John Abraham; Arjun Kapoor; Disha Patani; Tara Sutaria	T-Series Films, Balaji Motion Pictures	
J U L	29	Good Luck Jerry	Sidharth Sengupta	Janhvi Kapoor; Deepak Dobriyal; Mita Vashisht; Neeraj Sood; Saurabh Sachdeva; Sushant Singh	Lyca Productions, Mahaveer Jain Films, Colour Yellow Productions, Disney+ Hotstar	
A U G	2	Odd Couple	Prashant Johari	Divyenndu; Suchitra Krishnamoorthi; Vijay Raaz; Pranati Rai Prakash	Nipram Creations, Amazon Prime Video	
A U G	5	Darlings	Jasmeet K Reen	Alia Bhatt; Shefali Shah; Vijay Varma	Red Chillies Entertainment, Eternal Sunshine Productions, Netflix	
A U G	11	Laal Singh Chaddha	Advait Chandan	Aamir Khan; Kareena Kapoor; Naga Chaitanya; Mona Singh	Paramount Pictures, Viacom18 Studios, Aamir Khan Productions	
A U G	11	Raksha Bandhan	Aanand L. Rai	Akshay Kumar; Bhumi Pednekar	Zee Studios, Colour Yellow Productions, Cape of Good Films	
A U G	19	Dobaaraa	Anurag Kashyap	Taapsee Pannu; Pavail Gulati	Balaji Motion Pictures, Cult Movies, The Vermilion World, Athena ENM,	
A U G	25	Liger	Puri Jagannadh	Vijay Deverakonda; Ananya Pandey; Ronit Roy; Ramya Krishna; Mike Tyson	Dharma Productions, Puri Connects	
A U G	26	Holy Cow	Sai Kabir	Sanjay Mishra; Tigmanshu Dhulia; Nawazuddin Siddiqui; Sadiya Siddiqui	K Sera Sera Box Office, YS Entertainment, Sukh Saga Films, Reltic Pictures	
S E P	2	Cuttputlli	Ranjit M Tewari	Akshay Kumar; Rakul Preet Singh; Chandrachur Singh; Sargun Mehta	Pooja Entertainment, Disney+Hotstar	
S E P	9	Brahmāstra: Part One – Shiva	Ayan Mukerji	Ranbir Kapoor; Amitabh Bachchan; Alia Bhatt; Mouni Roy; Nagarjuna	Star Studios, Dharma Productions, Prime Focus, Magic Wand Films	
S E P	16	Jahaan Chaar Yaar	Kamal Pandey	Swara Bhasker; Meher Vij; Pooja Chopra; Shikha Talsania	Pen Marudhar, Soundrya Productions	
S E P	16	Jogi	Ali Abbas Zafar	Diljit Dosanjh; Kumud Mishra; Mohammed Zeeshan Ayyub; Hiten Tejwani; Amyra Dastur	AAZ Films, Netflix	
S E P	16	Matto Ki Saikil	M. Gani	Prakash Jha	Prakash Jha Productions, Shivdeva Films	
S E P	16	Middle Class Love	Rantnaa Sinha	Prit Kamani; Kavya Thapar; Eisha Singh; Manoj Pahwa	Zee Studios, Benaras Media Works	
S E P	16	Saroj Ka Rishta	Abhishek Saxena	Sanah Kapur; Kumud Mishra; Gaurav Pandey; Randeep Rai	Kapoor Films, Aena Productions, Ambi Abhi Productions, Garg Films	
S E P	16	Siya	Manish Mundra	Viineet Kumar Singh; Pooja Pandey; Rashmi Somvanshi	Drishyam Films, Panorama Studios	
S E P	23	Atithi Bhooto Bhava	Hardik Gajjar	Jackie Shroff; Pratik Gandhi; Sharmin Segal	Pen Studios, ZEE5	
S E P	23	Babli Bouncer	Madhur Bhandarkar	Tamannaah	Star Studios, Junglee Pictures, Disney+ Hotstar	
S E P	23	Chup: Revenge of the Artist	R Balki	Sunny Deol; Dulquer Salmaan; Pooja Bhatt; Shreya Dhanwanthary	Pen Studios, Hope Productions	
S E P	23	Dhokha: Round D Corner	Kookie Gulati	R. Madhavan; Aparshakti Khurana; Darshan Kumar; Khushalii Kumar	T-Series Films	
S E P	23	Ishq Pashmina	Arvind Pandey	Bhavin Bhanushali; Malti Chahar; Zarina Wahab	Krishna Shanti Production, Panorama Studios	
S E P	30	Plan A Plan B	Shashanka Ghosh	Riteish Deshmukh; Tamannaah; Poonam Dhillon; Kusha Kapila	India Stories Media & Entertainment, Funk Your Blues Entertainment, Netflix	
S E P	30	Vikram Vedha	Pushkar–Gayathri	Saif Ali Khan; Hrithik Roshan; Radhika Apte	T-Series Films, Reliance Entertainment, YNOT Studios, Friday Filmworks	

== October–December ==
Opening		Title	Director	Cast	Studio (production house)	Ref.
O C T	6	Maja Ma	Anand Tiwari	Madhuri Dixit; Gajraj Rao; Ritwik Bhowmik; Barkha Singh	Leo Media Collective, Amazon Prime Video	
O C T	7	Goodbye	Vikas Bahl	Amitabh Bachchan; Neena Gupta; Rashmika Mandanna	Balaji Motion Pictures, Good Co., Saraswati Entertainment	
O C T	7	Nazar Andaaz	Vikrant Deshmukh	Kumud Mishra; Divya Dutta; Abhishek Banerjee	T-Series Films, Kathputli Creations	
O C T	14	Doctor G	Anubhuti Kashyap	Ayushmann Khurrana; Rakul Preet Singh; Shefali Shah	Junglee Pictures	
O C T	14	Code Name: Tiranga	Ribhu Dasgupta	Parineeti Chopra; Harrdy Sandhu; Sharad Kelkar	T-Series Films, Reliance Entertainment, Film Hangar	
O C T	25	Ram Setu	Abhishek Sharma	Akshay Kumar; Jacqueline Fernandez; Nushrratt Bharuccha; Satyadev	Amazon Prime Video, Cape of Good Films, Lyca Productions, Abundantia Entertainment	
O C T	25	Thank God	Indra Kumar	Ajay Devgn; Sidharth Malhotra; Rakul Preet Singh	T-Series Films, Maruti International, Soham Rockstar Entertainment, Sri Adhikari Brothers	
O C T	28	Tara Vs Bilal	Samar Iqbal	Harshvardhan Rane; Sonia Rathee	T-Series Films, JA Entertainment	
N O V	4	Phone Bhoot	Gurmmeet Singh	Katrina Kaif; Ishaan Khatter; Siddhant Chaturvedi	Excel Entertainment	
N O V	4	Double XL	Satramm Ramani	Sonakshi Sinha; Huma Qureshi; Zaheer Iqbal; Mahat Raghavendra	T-Series Films, Wakaoo Films, Elemen3 Entertainment, Reclining Seats Cinema	
N O V	4	Mili	Mathukutty Xavier	Janhvi Kapoor; Manoj Pahwa; Sunny Kaushal	Zee Studios, Bayview Projects	
N O V	4	Tadka	Prakash Raj	Nana Patekar; Shriya Saran; Ali Fazal; Taapsee Pannu	Prakash Raj Productions, Movie Makers Inc., ZEE5	
N O V	11	Rocket Gang	Bosco Martis	Aditya Seal; Nikita Dutta	Zee Studios	
N O V	11	Uunchai	Sooraj Barjatya	Amitabh Bachchan; Anupam Kher; Boman Irani; Danny Denzongpa; Parineeti Chopra; Neena Gupta; Sarika	Rajshri Productions, Mahaveer Jain Films, Boundless Media	
N O V	11	Monica, O My Darling	Vasan Bala	Rajkummar Rao; Huma Qureshi; Radhika Apte; Sikandar Kher	Matchbox Shots, Netflix	
N O V	11	Thai Massage	Mangesh Hadawale	Gajraj Rao; Divyenndu; Sunny Hinduja; Rajpal Yadav; Vibha Chibber	T-Series Films, Reliance Entertainment, Window Seat Films	
N O V	18	Drishyam 2	Abhishek Pathak	Ajay Devgn; Akshaye Khanna; Tabu; Shriya Saran	T-Series Films, Viacom18 Studios, Panorama Studios	
N O V	18	Mister Mummy	Shaad Ali	Riteish Deshmukh; Genelia Deshmukh; Mahesh Manjrekar	T-Series Films, Hectic Cinema, Boundscript	
N O V	25	Bhediya	Amar Kaushik	Varun Dhawan; Kriti Sanon	Maddock Films, Jio Studios	
D E C	1	Qala	Anvita Dutt	Tripti Dimri; Swastika Mukherjee; Babil Khan	Clean Slate Filmz, Netflix	
D E C	2	An Action Hero	Anirudh Iyer	Ayushmann Khurrana; Jaideep Ahlawat	T-Series Films, Colour Yellow Productions	
D E C	2	Freddy	Shashanka Ghosh	Kartik Aaryan; Alaya F	Balaji Motion Pictures, NH Studioz, Northern Lights Films, Disney+ Hotstar	
D E C	2	India Lockdown	Madhur Bhandarkar	Shweta Basu Prasad; Aahana Kumra; Prateik Babbar; Sai Tamhankar; Prakash Belawadi	Pen Studios, Bhandarkar Entertainment, PJ Motion Pictures, ZEE5	
D E C	9	Salaam Venky	Revathi	Kajol; Vishal Jethwa	Sony Pictures Releasing International India, Zee Studios, Connekkt Media, Blive Productions, RTake Studios	
D E C	9	Vadh	Jaspal Singh Sandhu	Sanjay Mishra; Neena Gupta	Luv Films, J Studio Films, Next Level Production	
D E C	9	Maarrich	Dhruv Lather	Tusshar Kapoor; Naseeruddin Shah; Rahul Dev; Seerat Kapoor; Anita Hassanandani	Tusshar Entertainment House, NH Studioz	
D E C	9	Josef – Born in Grace	Susant Mishra	Victor Banerjee; Subrat Dutta	UA Kathachitrra	
D E C	9	Blurr	Ajay Bahl	Taapsee Pannu; Gulshan Devaiah	Zee Studios, Outsiders Films, Echelon Productions, ZEE5	
D E C	16	Govinda Naam Mera	Shashank Khaitan	Vicky Kaushal; Kiara Advani; Bhumi Pednekar	Viacom18 Studios, Dharma Productions, Mentor Disciple Films	
D E C	16	Ajay Wardhan	Pragati Agarwal	Ruslaan Mumtaz; Arjumman Mughal	Dushyant Corporation, Prasidh Eklavaya Entertainment	
D E C	16	Trahimam	Dushyant Pratap Singh	Arshi Khan; Pankaj Berry	Dushyant Corporation	
D E C	23	Cirkus	Rohit Shetty	Ranveer Singh; Pooja Hegde; Jacqueline Fernandez; Varun Sharma	T-Series Films, Reliance Entertainment, Rohit Shetty Productionz	
D E C	30	Dedh Lakh Ka Dulha	Abhay Pratap Singh	Akhilendra Mishra; Ishtiyak Khan; Harshita Panwar	KK Films Creations	

== See also ==
- List of Hindi films of 2023
- List of Hindi films of 2021
