= Time Nahi Hai =

2019 Indian film

- Directed by: Manoj Sharma
- Written by: Manish Rander
- Produced by: R.G. Siddaramaiah
- Release date: 18 October 2019
- Running time: 119 minutes
- Country: India
- Language: Hindi

Time Nahi Hai (also known as Life Mein Time Nahi Hai Kisi Ko) is a Hindi film released on 18 October 2019. The film stars Krushna Abhishek, Rajneesh Duggal, Shakti Kapoor, Rajpal Yadav, Yuvika Chaudhary, Govind Namdev, Aanjjan Srivastav, Sunil Pal, Tiku Talsania, Hemant Pandey, Ramandeep Kaur and others.

The film is directed by Manoj Sharma and produced by Manish Rander, Shyamsunder Malani, Rajesh Rander, Vishnu Sharda and Sanjay Garg. Online Marketing by Sudhanshu Kumar. Time Nahi hai has been shot on location in Udaipur, Rajasthan.

== Cast ==
- Krushna Abhishek
- Rajneesh Duggal
- Shakti Kapoor
- Rajpal Yadav
- Yuvika Chaudhary
- Govind Namdev
- Aanjjan Srivastav
- Sunil Pal
- Tiku Talsania
- Hemant Pandey
- Ramandeep Kaur
- Gopi Bhalla
