= Laawaris =

Laawaris may refer to:

- Laawaris (1981 film), an Indian drama film directed by Prakash Mehra
- Laawaris (1999 film), an Indian romance film directed by Shrikant Sharma
