= Pill Hai Ke Manta Nahi =

Hindi comedy drama

- Directed by: Aarya Babbar
- Written by: Aarya Babbar
- Starring: Sharib Hashmi; Gopi Bhalla; Cheshta Bhagat; Nancy Thakkar; Rashika Pradhan; Aarya Babbar
- Music by: Sajid Masood
- Production company: Babbar House
- Distributed by: Disney+ Hotstar
- Release date: 28 January 2023
- Country: India
- Language: Hindi

Pill Hai Ke Manta Nahi is an Indian comedy drama starring Sharib Hashmi, Gopi Bhalla, Aarya Babbar, Cheshta Bhagat, Nancy Thakkar and Rashika Pradhan. The film is produced by Babbar House and Parmar Productions. It is written and directed by Aarya Babbar, in his directorial debut, with music composed by Sajid Masood.

== Story ==
The story of the film is about "a married man named Manav (Aarya Babbar), who is involved in an extramarital affair with Mahek (Rashika Pradhan). Things take a turn when Manav does unprotected sex with Mahek and compels her to take a pill to prevent pregnancy, but she refuses to kill the unborn child and insists on keeping the baby. Payal (Cheshta Bhagat) who is Maanav's wife, is pregnant and in labour at the same time."

== Reception ==
=== Cricital response ===
The film generally received mixed reviews from critics, with many criticizing the story and direction.

Archika Khurana of The Times of India gave 1.5 stars out of 5, calling it "completely bizarre". She further adds "Overall, the concept of 'Pill Hai Ke Manta Nahi' is not novel, but with better writing and execution, the film could have been watchable. The song "Aa Sohneya Ve" by Moolmantra is catchy, but nothing else about this short film is."

Jyoti Raghav from Amar Ujala gave the film, a rating of 1 out of 5 stars and wrote "The way Arya Babbar has presented a socially very influential subject, first as a director and then as an actor, is very childish. If this story had been written by a capable screenwriter, it could have been a very powerful film of 90 minutes, a social drama can also be written on it and a suspense film too."
