= Priya Gill =

Indian actress

- Born: Punjab, India
- Occupations: Actress, model
- Beauty pageant titleholder
- Title: Femina Miss India International 1995
- Years active: 1996–2006
- Major competitions: Femina Miss India 1994 (Finalist); Femina Miss India 1995 (Finalist); Miss International 1995 (Unplaced)

Priya Gill is an Indian former actress and beauty pageant titleholder who primarily appeared in Hindi films. She won the title of Femina Miss India International 1995 and represented India at Miss International 1995. Gill is best known for her debut film Tere Mere Sapne (1996), which won her the Screen Award for Best Female Debut and for Sirf Tum (1999).

== Film career ==
Gill began her Bollywood career with the ABCL production Tere Mere Sapne (1996) along with Arshad Warsi and Chandrachur Singh. Other film appearances include the hit films Sirf Tum (1999), Josh (2000), and Red (2002). After appearing in some Malayalam, Tamil, Telugu, and Punjabi films, she left acting in 2006.

== Filmography ==
Year	Title	Role(s)	Language(s)	Notes	Ref.
1996	Tere Mere Sapne	Paro Shastri	Hindi	Nominated - Filmfare Award for Best Female Debut	
1998	Sham Ghansham	Geeta	Hindi		
1999	Sirf Tum	Aarti	Hindi		
1999	Bade Dilwala	Piya	Hindi		
1999	Megham	Meenakshi	Malayalam	Malayalam debut	
2000	Josh	Roseanne	Hindi		
2000	Bagunnara	Priya	Telugu	Telugu debut	
2000	Rayalaseema Ramanna Chowdary	Murali's lover and wife	Telugu		
2001	Jeetenge Hum		Hindi	Unreleased	
2002	Red	Gayathri	Tamil	Tamil debut	
2002	Jee Aayan Nu	Simar	Punjabi	Punjabi debut	
2003	LOC Kargil	Charulatha	Hindi		
2003	Border Hindustan Ka	Nargis	Hindi		
2006	Piya Tose Naina Lage		Bhojpuri	Bhojpuri debut	
2006	Bhairavi	Bhairavi	Hindi		

Preceded by (India) Francesca Marilyn Hart	Femina Miss India International; 1995	Succeeded by (India) Fleur Xavier
