= Manoj Sharma =

Indian film director

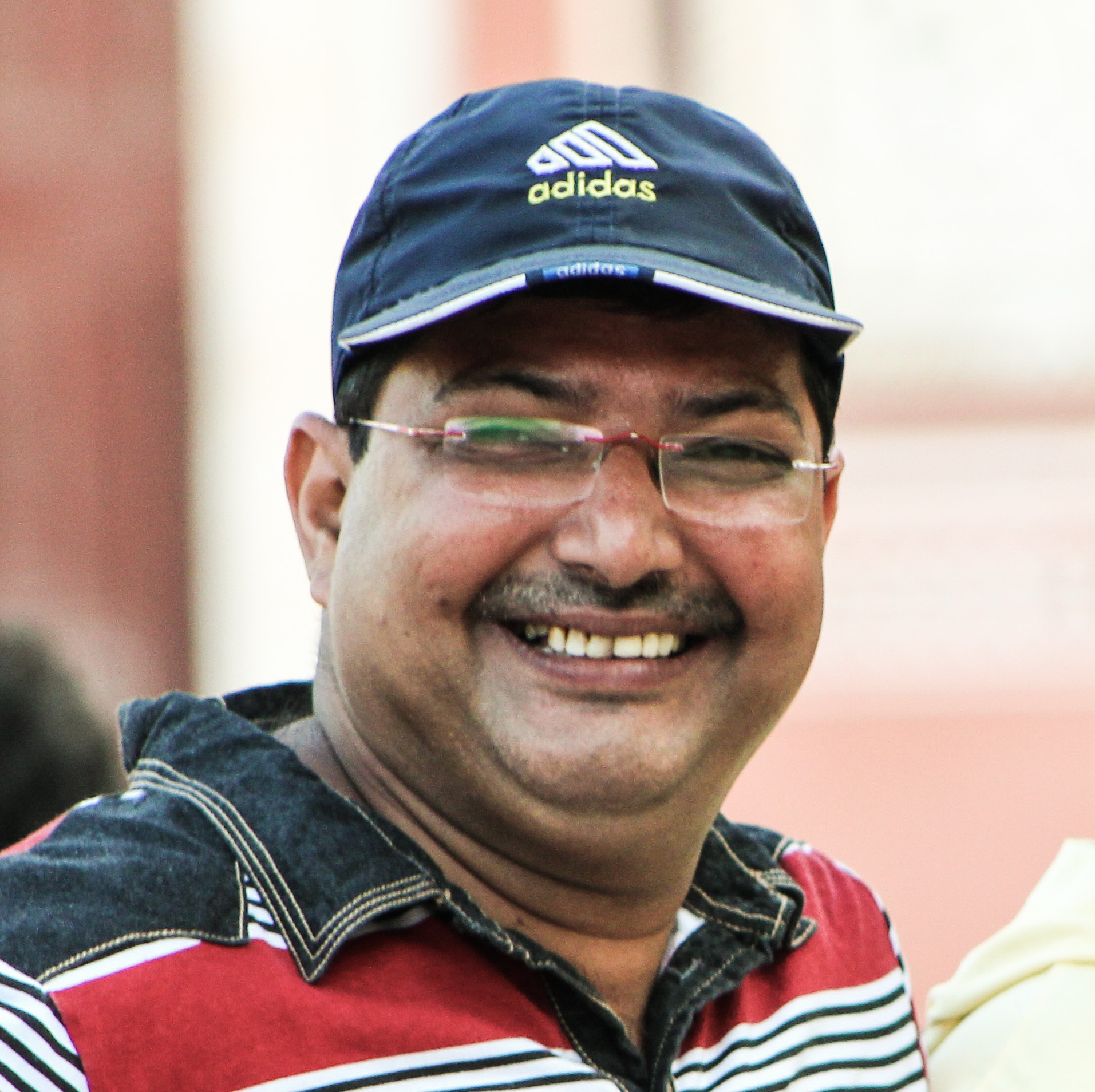
- Born: 19 October 1973 (age 52); Khurja district Bulandshahr, Uttar Pradesh, India
- Occupations: Film director, Film writer, Actor, screenwriter
- Years active: 1992–present

Manoj Sharma (born 19 October 1973) is an Indian film director, film writer, screenwriter and editor.

As a screenplay writer and director, he is noted for Bin Phere Free Me Ttere, Sparsh-the touch, Mai ka Bitwa and Swaha: Life Beyond Superstition. He encountered a major controversy over his movie Swaha.

He has directed more than 150 music albums with over one thousand music videos as an in-house writer and director with Venus Audio Visual. As an assistant editor and assistant director, he advanced movies such as Tahalka (1992), Maa and Policewala Gunda (1995)

As a television director, he made serials such as Sab Ka Maalik Ek Hai (DD National), Bikhre Panne (DD National), Kashmir - Ek Jannat (DD National).

Prakash Electronics, Sting Operation.com and Chal Guru Ho Ja Shuru are upcoming projects. Guru Ho Ja Shuru, starring Hemant Pandey, Chandrachur Singh, Manoj Pahwa and Sanjay Mishra, is based on fake spiritual guru.

== Early life ==
Sharma was born at Khurja district Bulandshahr in Uttar Pradesh. He attended for one year and then moved to Delhi to learn the textile trade from his brother-in-law during his vacations. He later moved to Mumbai. After watching film shooting, he decided to try acting, supported by his brother-in-law for a trial period of three months.

After watching one of his audition videos, he decided to give up acting and try his hand in some other stream of filmmaking.

== Career ==
Manoj Sharma started his career as an assistant editor and assistant director to many directors.

His first film as a director was Sparsh-The Touch (2005). His second was Mai ka Bitwa (2008), starring Inder Kumar, which was a major hit of that year. He directed videos of Indian songs such as Tum to thehre pardesi, Yaaron maine panga le liya, Awara hawa ka jhonka hoon, Agar tum mil jao, and Pardesiya Re. He directed many comedy videos for Raju Shrivastav during his early days.

He got his first break as independent television director for the serial Sabka Malik ek hai from the 13th episode of the show.

== Filmography ==
| Year | Film | Notes |
|---|---|---|
| 1992 | Tahalka (2003 film) | Asst. Director and Asst Editor |
| 1992 | Maa (1992 film) | Asst. Director and Asst Editor |
| 1995 | Policewala Gunda (1995 film) | Asst. Director and Asst Editor |
| 2005 | Sparsh-The Touch (2003 film) | Writer and Director |
| 2008 | Mai Ka Bitwa (2008 Bhojpuri film) | Writer and Director |
| 2010 | Swaha: Life Beyond Superstition (2010 film) | Writer and Director |
| 2013 | Bin Phere Free Me Ttere | Writer and Director |
| 2015 | Chal Guru Ho Jaa Shuru | Write rand Director |
| 2016 | Yeh Hai Lollipop | Writer and Director |
| 2017 | Prakash Electronic | Writer and Director |
| 2021 | Dehati Disco | Writer Director and Screenplay |
