= Rajesh Joshi (actor) =

Indian actor (1968–1998)

- Born: 31 July 1968; Mahad, Maharashtra, India
- Died: 12 January 1998 (aged 29); Mumbai, Maharashtra, India
- Occupations: Actor; Film producer
- Spouse: Falguni Joshi
- Relatives: Manoj Joshi

Rajesh Joshi (31 July 1968 – 12 January 1998) was an Indian film and theater actor known for his roles in Rangeela (1995) and Sarfarosh (1999) as Pakya and Bala Thakur, respectively.

He was injured in a car crash on 11 January 1998 and died the next day, aged 29. Satya was his last film. Joshi was the younger brother of actor Manoj Joshi.

== Filmography ==
- Antham (1991)
- Rangeela (1995) as Pakya
- Tere Mere Sapne (1996) as Astrologer
- Aflatoon (1997) as Akshay's Friend
- Satya (1998) as Bapu
- Sarfarosh (1999) as Bala Thakur
- Lawaaris (1999)
- Khauff (2000)
