= Aisa Kyon Hota Hai? =

- Directed by: Ajay Kanchan
- Produced by: Dominic Emmanula
- Starring: Rati Agnihotri; Aryan Vaid; Gopi Bhalla; Mehul Bhojak; Avtar Gill; Johnny Lever; Rachana Maurya
- Cinematography: Rajan Kinagi
- Edited by: Ashfaq Makrani
- Music by: Tausif Akhtar
- Release date: 6 February 2006 (India)
- Country: India
- Language: Hindi

Aisa Kyun Hota Hai? is a 2006 Hindi-language film directed by Ajay Kanchan (in his directorial debut). The film stars Rati Agnihotri, Aryan Vaid, Gopi Bhalla, Mehul Bhojak, and Avtar Gill.

== Plot ==
Kiran marries Vivek, and shortly after they wed, they separate, and Vivek returns to the U.S. and refuses to talk to Kiran, who gives birth to a son she names Raj. She learns that Vivek never loved her but married her to gain funds in his father's will, requiring that he marry to inherit. Kiran decides not to tell Raj about his father. In college years later, Raj has become a star basketball player who hates men who leave their families. Raj has numerous affairs with fellow classmates and ends up contracting HIV.

== Cast ==
- Rati Agnihotri as Kiran
- Aryan Vaid as Raj
- Gopi Bhalla
- Mehul Bhojak as Raunaq 'Ronny' Singh
- Avtar Gill as Inspector Premraj Bhatt
- Johnny Lever as Basketball Coach Banta Singh
- Rachana Maurya as Aditi
- Megha Chatterji
- Dr. Dominic Emmanuel as Principal of Dominic Savio College
- Anisha Hinduja
- Mitra Joshi
- Akanksha Malhotra
- Shruti Malhotra as Tanvi Hyder Ali Khan
- Manish Mathur

== Soundtrack ==
Song	Singer(s)
Aisa Kyun Hota Hai	Shreya Ghoshal
Ishq Dhamaka	Kunal Ganjawala, Sowmya Raoh, Sunidhi Chauhan
If You Wanna Love Me	Tauseef Akhtar
Ishq Huwa Hai, Huwa Hai	Tauseef Akhtar
Oh Yara Dildara	Shreya Ghoshal, Sonu Nigam
Tere Bachpan Kee Mai Lori	Alka Yagnik

== Reception ==
Taran Adarsh of IndiaFM gave the film 1 out of 5, writing, "On the whole, AISA KYON HOTA HAI? neither enlightens, nor entertains."

The film earned ₹6 lakh against a budget of ₹1 crore.
