= Journey of Bhangover =

- Directed by: Mahinder Singh Saniwal
- Written by: Mahinder Singh Saniwal
- Screenplay by: Mahinder Singh Saniwal
- Produced by: Mahinder Singh Saniwal; Meenakshi Vijay; Sumitra Hooda Pednekar; Sanjeev Kakkar
- Starring: Prerika Arora; Aradhya Taing; Rohit Thakur; Pawan Berwal; Jimmy Sharma; Hemant Pandey; Anmol Khatri; Palash Soni; Yashpal Sharma; Jaideep Ahlwat; Soniya Sharma; The Begraj; Rajoo Maan; Sapna Choudhary
- Cinematography: Jigar
- Edited by: Vinod Pathak,
- Music by: Siddhant Mahadev; MD KD; Shanjh V. Rani; Malhar
- Production company: Bannada Films
- Distributed by: Cinekorn Films
- Release date: 15 December 2017
- Running time: 117 minutes
- Country: India
- Language: Hindi

Journey of Bhangover is an 2017 Indian Hindi-language comedy thriller film, directed by Mahinder Singh Saniwal. It stars Prerika Arora, Aradhya Taing, Jimmy Sharma, Yashpal Sharma, Anmol Khatri, Palash Soni and Hemant Pandey.

The film was released on 15 December 2017.

== Cast ==
- Prerika Arora
- Aradhya Taing
- Jimmy Sharma
- Hemant Pandey
- Anmol Khatri
- Palash Soni
- Yashpal Sharma
- Jaideep Ahlawat
- Rohit Thakur
- Soniya Sharma
- The Begraj
- Rajoo Maan
- Sapna Chowdhary as item number "Love Bite"

== Soundtrack ==
The Music was composed By Siddhant Madhav and released by T-Series. All lyrics were written by Azeem Shirazi.

Journey of Bhangover

Soundtrack album by Siddhant Madhav
- Released: 9 November 2017
- Recorded: 2017
- Genre: Soundtrack
- Length: 18:25
- Label: T-Series
- Producer: Siddhant Madhav

Siddhant Madhav chronology
Viraam (2017)	Journey of Bhangover (2017)

Track list
No.	Title	Singer(s)	Length
1.	"Mehki Mehki Raatein"	Javed Ali	3:31
2.	"Bada Ajeeb Hai Ye Safar"	Arun Singh, Tripty Sinha	3:52
3.	"Saiyan"	Divya Dutt	5:19
4.	"Sumiran Tero Naam"	Tripty Sinha	4:30
5.	"Mehki Mehki Raatein - 2"	Amit Gupta	3:30
Total length:			18:25

== See also ==
- List of Hindi comedy films
- List of Bollywood thriller films
