= Chal Guru Ho Ja Shuru =

- Theatrical poster
- Directed by: Manoj Sharma
- Written by: Manoj Sharma
- Produced by: Pankaj Narayan; Apoorva Bajaj
- Starring: Hemant Pandey; Chandrachur Singh; Sanjay Mishra; Vrajesh Hirjee; Manoj Pahwa; Brijendra Kala; Tiku Talsania
- Cinematography: Saravanan Elavarasu
- Edited by: Dharam Soni
- Music by: Praveen Bhardwaj
- Production company: Ath Entertainment
- Release date: 30 January 2015
- Country: India
- Language: Hindi

Chal Guru Ho Ja Shuru is a 2015 Indian Hindi-language satirical comedy film directed by Manoj Sharma and produced by Pankaj Narayan and Apoorva Bajaj under the banner of Ath Entertainment Pvt. Ltd. in association with Himalayan Dreams. The film critiques the phenomenon of self-styled godmen in India, portraying how such figures exploit public faith for personal gain.

The film stars Hemant Pandey, Chandrachur Singh, Sanjay Mishra, Vrajesh Hirjee, Manoj Pahwa, Brijendra Kala, and Tiku Talsania, among others. It was released in India on 30 January 2015 and was granted tax exemption in Uttarakhand by the state's Chief Minister Harish Rawat ahead of its release.

== Plot ==
The story follows a group of unemployed theatre artists who turn to impersonating godmen as a way to make a living. Their fraudulent enterprise brings them fame and money, but the deception soon spirals out of control, forcing them to confront the consequences of their actions.

== Cast ==
- Hemant Pandey as Hariya baba
- Chandrachur Singh as Sathya baba
- Vrajesh Hirjee as Chote baba
- Sanjay Mishra as Ungli baba
- Manoj Pahwa
- Brijendra Kala
- Tiku Talsania
- Pawan Kumar Sharma
- Mithilesh Chaturvedi

== Music ==
The music of the film is composed and written by Praveen Bhardwaj.

No.	Title	Writer(s)	Singer(s)	Length
1.	"Chal Guru Ho Ja Shuru"	Praveen Bhardwaj	Sandeep Acharya	05:23

== Reception ==
In his review for India Today, Saurabh Dwivedi said that the film was brave yet was "marred by weak script, vulgar dialogues and impossible climax". Aaj Tak described it as poorly executed with weak direction and wasted performances. Navbharat Times gave it 2.5/5, stating that despite a strong theme, the film suffered from a loose screenplay and weak execution.
