= Preethiya Theru =

- Directed by: Prasad
- Written by: Malavalli Saikrishna (dialogue)
- Screenplay by: Prasad
- Story by: Prasad
- Produced by: S Lokesh Reddy
- Starring: Thanil; Madhumitha; Sonia
- Cinematography: BL Babu
- Edited by: B S Kemparaj
- Music by: Prasad
- Production company: Vijayalakshmi Films International
- Release date: 8 January 2010
- Country: India
- Language: Kannada

Preethiya Theru (transl. Chariot of love) is a 2010 Indian Kannada-language romantic drama film directed by Prasad and starring Thanil, Madhumitha, and Sonia.

== Cast ==
- Thanil as Shakthi
- Madhumitha as Preethi
- Sonia as Spoorthi
- Sadhu Kokila
- Dharma as Seena
- Lokesh Reddy as Guruji
- R. G. Vijayasarathy as the discotheque owner
- Mysore Ramanand
- Malathi Sardeshpande
- Mico Nagaraj
- Thenali Anand
- M. N. Lakshmi Devi
- Bank Janardhan
- Rachana Maurya as an item number in "Kabli Hula Nanu"

== Soundtrack ==
All lyrics are written by V. Nagendra Prasad, Srikanth and Prasad; all music is composed by Prasad. The audio launch took place in 2009.

Track listing
No.	Title	Singer(s)	Length
1.	"Deal Appo Deal"	Hemanth	4:19
2.	"Kabli Hula Nanu"	Prasad, Chaitra H. G., Srinivas	4:25
3.	"Prema Taro"	Hariharan	3:55
4.	"Sum Sumane"	Soujanya, Kunal Ganjawala	4:27
5.	"Yenanithya Ninge"	S. P. Balasubrahmanyam	4:15
6.	"Yenidennu Maya"	Vijay Yesudas, K. S. Chithra	4:34
Total length:			25:55

== Reception ==
A critic from The New Indian Express wrote that "The movie is worth watching if you go to the theatre without expecting too much entertainment". A critic from IANS wrote that "Preethiya Theru isn't really worth watching. While technically it is average, the performances are a letdown". A critic from Chitraloka wrote that "This is not a great film but not a wasted effort either".
