= Rayalaseema Ramanna Chowdary =

- Poster
- Directed by: Suresh Krissna
- Written by: Paruchuri Brothers (dialogues); Arunachalam Creations (story/screenplay)
- Produced by: Mohan Babu
- Starring: Mohan Babu; Jayasudha; Prema; Priya Gill; Chandra Mohan
- Cinematography: V. Jayaram
- Music by: Mani Sharma
- Release date: September 15, 2000
- Country: India
- Language: Telugu

Rayalaseema Ramanna Chowdary is a 2000 Telugu-language film directed by Suresh Krissna. The film stars Mohan Babu, Jayasudha, Prema, Priya Gill and Chandra Mohan.

== Plot ==
A man loses his land and sent away from his village. Later on, his son gets the land his father lost forcefully. This lands him in trouble and he doesn't even care about his family except the land. Later, he dies.

== Cast ==
- Mohan Babu as in a dual role as Rayalaseema Ramanna Chowdary / Murali
- Jayasudha as Seetha
- Priya Gill as Murali's lover and wife
- Prema as Naga Sulochana
- Giri Babu as Jagannadham, Bhikshupathi's father
- Chandra Mohan as Venkata Sastry "Venkanna"
- Tarun Master as Bhikshupathi
- Achyuth as Raghu, Murali's brother and Ramanna's Younger son
- Jaya Prakash Reddy as Sambasiva Rao
- Narra Venkateswara Rao as Subbarayudu
- Ranganath as Siva Rama Krishnayya
- Raghunatha Reddy as Seetha's father
- Rallapalli as Lokeswara Rao
- Napoleon as Jatadhara Swamiji
- Brahmanandam as Annavaram
- Kovai Sarala as Venkamma

== Production ==
The story was reportedly given to Suresh Krissna by Rajinikanth. Tarun worked as the choreographer and villain for the film. The film was shot at Pollachi.

== Soundtrack ==
The music was composed by Mani Sharma and released by Aditya Music.

Rayalaseema Ramanna Chowdary

Soundtrack album by Mani Sharma
- Released: 2000
- Recorded: 2000
- Genre: Soundtrack
- Length: 25:58
- Label: Aditya Music
- Producer: Mani Sharma

Mani Sharma chronology
Manoharam (2000)	Rayalaseema Ramanna Chowdary (2000)	Azad (2000)

Track-List
No.	Title	Lyrics	Singer(s)	Length
1.	"Buchimallu Buchimallu"	Suddala Ashok Teja	Sukhwinder Singh, K. S. Chithra	4:44
2.	"Ramanna Ramanna"	Suddala Ashok Teja	Shankar Mahadevan	4:22
3.	"Allade Allade"	Sirivennela Seetharama Sastry	Hariharan, Harini	6:36
4.	"Chamaku Chamaku Manu"	Sirivennela Seetharama Sastry	Udit Narayan, K. S. Chithra	5:28
5.	"Yedure Ledinka"	Suddala Ashok Teja	Shankar Mahadevan	4:40
Total length:				25:58

== Awards ==
- Kovai Sarala won the Nandi Award for Best Female Comedian

== Reception ==
Idlebrain wrote "The first half of the film is little confusing, as you have no clue about how the scenes are coming and where the story is going. In the second half the story gains momentum and ends with a neat and impressive climax". Telugu Cinema wrote "Mohan Babu’s histrionics and gimmicks, mostly resembling Rajanikath in Pedarayudu, are hard hitting but prove that Mohan Babu has something to offer to his fans. Though Mohan Babu comes in dual role, the role of the son has nothing much to do except doing some song numbers with Priya Gill who looks too odd as a village girl. Songs and dance sequences are not up to the mark. It’s a film for those who want to show Mohan Babu in Rajanikanth’s shoes".
