= Sarhad Paar =

2007 Indian Hindi language film by Raman Kumar

- Theatrical release poster
- Directed by: Raman Kumar
- Screenplay by: Akash Khurana; Robin Bhatt
- Produced by: Goldie Tucker
- Starring: Sanjay Dutt; Chandrachur Singh; Tabu; Mahima Chaudhry
- Cinematography: Manmohan Singh
- Music by: Anand Raj Anand
- Production company: Nimbus Motion Pictures
- Release date: 9 March 2007
- Country: India
- Language: Hindi

Sarhad Paar is a 2007 Indian Hindi-language action drama film directed by Raman Kumar and produced by Goldie Tucker. The film stars Sanjay Dutt, Tabu, Mahima Chaudhry, Chandrachur Singh and Rahul Dev. The script was co-written by Akash Khurana, who also plays a pivotal supporting character in the film.

== Story ==
This story is about Ranjeet Singh (Sanjay Dutt), who is a major in the Indian Army. One day Bakhtawar and his men attacked the Indian Army. Ranjeet Singh and some army men cross the Indian border to kill them. But in a blast, all of them are killed, but Ranjeet is saved. Ranjeet is tortured to reveal classified information, but he does not succumb. In the process, Ranjeet loses his memory. After that, 'Bade Miyan' (Father of Bakhtawar) saves Ranjeet. When Ranjeet comes out of his illness, he decides to send Ranjeet back to India. But on the other side, in Ranjeet's home, Pummy (Tabu), Simran (Mahima Chaudhry) and his father wait for Ranjeet. The Panchayat wants to erect a statue in honour of his death, but Pummy wants to avoid this. Pummy obtains information that Pakistan would be releasing some Indian soldiers. They also release Ranjeet, but because of his loss of memory, he is unable to find his way home. The Indian army puts Ranjeet in the hospital. Every day Ranjeet's wife Pummy and his sister Simran go to the hospital. Pummy tries to remind him of their own story. It is learnt that Ranjeet meets Pummy at the engagement of a friend Ravi (Chandrachur Singh) and falls in love with her, but her uncle and aunty get her engaged to a bad man. Pummy escaped from him and went to Ranjeet's home. He asks her to marry him, but Billa kidnaps Pummy, and then Ranjeet cuts Billa's hand. After the end of the story, on the second day, Simran comes with a rakhee to tie on Ranjeet. She requests the captain to give permission for them to go to the Gurdwara. However, Bakhtawar plants bombs everywhere to spread crime. Ranjeet knows Bakhtawar and he goes to catch him. Both fight with each other, but Ravi shoots Ranjeet's leg and Bakhtawar manages to escape. Ranjeet's lost memory comes back. To catch Bakhtawar, Ranjeet decides to get Simran and Ravi married. Bakhtawar comes to kill Ranjeet but fails. In the midst of all of this, Inspector Suraj dies. Ranjeet arrests Bakhtawar. However, when an aeroplane is hijacked, the Indian army decides to release Bakhtawar in return for the hostages.

== Cast ==
- Sanjay Dutt as Major Ranjeet Singh
- Tabu as Pammi
- Mahima Chaudhry as Simran Chaddha
- Chandrachur Singh as Ravi Brar
- Anjana Mumtaz as Ravi's Mother
- Rahul Dev as Bakhtawar
- Rana Jang Bahadur as Terrorist
- Akash Khurana as Bade Miyan
- Pankaj Dheer as Inspector Suraj Brar
- Sheela Sharma as Mrs. Suraj Brar
- Raza Murad as Major General Ashwini Kumar
- Avtar Gill as Lt. Col. Kulwant Singh, OC
- Rakesh Bedi as Dhola Singh
- Satyen Kappu as Taya
- Ram Mohan as Sarpanch
- Vishwajeet Pradhan as Captain Hanif Bilal
- Anang Desai as R. K. Gupta
- Gopi Bhalla
- Fakhar-e-Alam as Major Javaid (Pakistan Army)

== Music ==
The music of the film is composed by Anand Raj Anand and lyrics are penned by Dev Kohli.

#	Title	Singer(s)
1	"Aadha Sach"	Poornima
2	"Ae Zindagi"	Sunidhi Chauhan, Wadali Brothers
3	"Mere Rabba O Rabba Teri Mehrbaaniya"	Anand Raj Anand, Jaspinder Narula, Poornima
4	"Nit Khair Manga"	Smriti
5	"Sona Chandi"	Udit Narayan, Alka Yagnik
6	"Ae Zindagi (Reprise)"	Wadali Brothers
7	"Teriyaan Mohabbataan"	Anand Raj Anand
