= Red (2002 film) =

- Theatrical release poster
- Directed by: Singampuli
- Written by: Singampuli
- Produced by: S. S. Chakravarthy
- Starring: Ajith Kumar; Priya Gill
- Cinematography: R. D. Rajasekhar
- Edited by: A. Sreekar Prasad
- Music by: Deva
- Production company: NIC Arts Productions
- Release date: 14 January 2002
- Running time: 176 minutes
- Country: India
- Language: Tamil

Red is a 2002 Indian Tamil-language action film directed by Singampuli (credited as Ram Sathya) (in his directorial debut) and produced by S. S. Chakravarthy. The film stars Ajith Kumar in the titlular role alongside Priya Gill as the female lead, while Manivannan, Raghuvaran and Salim Ghouse played pivotal roles. The film's background score and soundtrack are composed by Deva.

Red released on 14 January 2002 and became an average success.

== Plot ==
Aathi is an orphan-gangster who is well known with his alias name RED, (Revolution, Education, and Development) at the Madurai district of Tamil Nadu who possesses a heart of gold, and when not bashing up mercenaries, he spends his time forcing schools to accept students without donations and taking care of orphans. Srini is his biggest enemy. RED falls for Gayathri, the daughter of his friend and confidante Narayanan, and helps her without her knowledge. She likes him but wants him to give up his life of violence. Meanwhile, reporter Manimegalai for Ananda Vikatan begins to serialise RED's life story under the name Aathi, and it becomes quite the rage among readers and rest forms the plot.

== Cast ==
- Ajith Kumar as RED (Aathi in Storybook)
- Priya Gill as Gayathri (Poornima in Storybook)
- Manivannan as Narayanan (Manivasagam in Storybook)
- Raghuvaran as Sethupathy
- Salim Ghouse as Srini (Kalivarathan in Storybook)
- Rajan P. Dev as Sarathy
- Revathi as Janaki (Saratha in Storybook)
- Kavitha as College principal
- Gandhimathi as Veeramma
- K. R. Vatsala as School principal
- Charle as Kaipulla
- Rajeev as Pachamuthu
- Anand as Radha Krishnan
- Ilavarasu as Pandi
- Aakash as Rahul
- Rajesh as Manimegalai
- Nizhalgal Ravi as Anand
- Vinu Chakravarthy as House owner
- Thalaivasal Vijay as the Ananda Vikatan reporter
- Mahanadi Shankar as Srini's henchman
- Madhan Bob as Aaruchamy
- Bava Lakshmanan as Police officer
- Vindhya as Mayakka, in the song "Dil Dil Italy Kattil"
- Kanal Kannan as himself (cameo appearance)

Uncredited

- Sampath Ram as Srini's henchman
- Ganesh as District Collector
- LIC Narasimhan as School correspondent
- Nellai Siva as Madurai resident
- Kovai Senthil as Bride's father
- Scissor Manohar as Auto driver
- Soori as a thief

== Production ==
NIC Arts, the producers of Ajith Kumar's previous films Vaalee, Mugavaree and Citizen signed him to appear in a film titled Red directed by debutant Singampuli, an associate of Sundar C. The original plot point of Ajith's 1999 film Unnai Thedi was recommended by Singampuli, and Ajith had mentioned that if the film became a success he would feature in a future film to be directed by Singampuli. Priya Gill made her first and only Tamil film appearance. Principal photography at Annapoorna Studios, where art director Sabu Cyril erected a part of Madurai town for the film. Filming took place in and around Chennai, Vishakhapatnam, Hyderabad and also around some outskirts of Madurai while songs were filmed overseas.

== Soundtrack ==
The soundtrack features six songs composed by Deva. All lyrics written by Vairamuthu. The prelude of the song "Kannai Kasakkum" is based on "Catch the Fox" by Den Harrow. The soundtrack became a success prior to release, with critics praising the songs particularly "Thai Madiyae".

Track listing
No.	Title	Singer(s)	Length
1.	"Kannai Kasakkum"	S. P. Balasubrahmanyam	7:06
2.	"Roja Kaathu"	Hariharan	5:17
3.	"November Madham"	Hariharan, Mahalaxmi Iyer	6:04
4.	"Olikuchi Udambukari"	KK, Anuradha Sriram	6:25
5.	"Dil Dil Italy Kattil"	Silambarasan, Mathangi Jagdish	5:46
6.	"Thai Madiyae"	Tippu	6:14
Total length:			36:52

== Critical reception ==
Malathi Rangarajan of The Hindu opined that "When the film begins stating that the title is an earth-shattering acronym (Revolution Education and Development), you wait for something radical and path-breaking. But no ... there is compassion, some mindless violence, a docile retreat, an impulsive retaliation ... and that's about all". A critic from Sify wrote that "Like it or not, in Red didacticism prevails over a clarity of vision, logic and reason. The films leaves you exhausted and stressed and is as avoidable as a migraine". Malini Mannath of Chennai Online said that "the script is insipid, the scenes are repeated, and it gets all too monotonous towards the end".

== Box office ==
Despite the film's success, India Today estimated it suffered a loss of ₹4 crore (equivalent to ₹16 crore or US$1.7 million in 2026).
