= Bin Phere Free Me Ttere =

- Directed by: Manoj Sharma
- Produced by: Premchandra Jha
- Starring: Arsh Deol; Ashrrita Agarwaal; Manoj Joshi
- Music by: Vishnu Narayan
- Distributed by: Premchandra Productions
- Release date: 3 May 2013
- Country: India
- Language: Hindi

Cái Bin Phere Free Me Ttere is a 2013 Hindi comedy film written and directed by Manoj Sharma. The film stars Arsh Deol, Ashrita Agarwal and Manoj Joshi (actor).

== Cast ==
- Arsh Deol
- Ashrita Agarwal
- Manoj Joshi
- Yashpal Sharma
- Manoj Pahwa
- Himani Shivpuri
- Govind Namdeo
- Mukesh Tiwari
- Sharat Saxena
- Atul Parchure
- Razzak Khan
- Mushtaq Khan

== Crew ==
- Manoj Sharma - Director
- Tanveer Alam - Associate Director
- Manjunath Gadigennavar -1st Asst director
