= Prakash Electronic =

Parakash Electronic
- Directed by: Manoj Sharma
- Starring: Hemant Pandey; Hrishitaa Bhatt; Sanjay Mishra
- Distributed by: India E-Commerce Ltd
- Release date: 6 January 2017
- Country: India
- Language: Hindi

Parakash Electronic is a 2017 Hindi comedy film directed by Manoj Sharma starring Hemant Pandey, Hrishitaa Bhatt, Sanjay Mishra, Manoj Pahwa Vrajesh Hirjee and Chandrachur Singh.

== Soundtrack ==
| No. | Title | Singer(s) | Length |
|---|---|---|---|
| 1. | "Ishq Da Current" | Labh Janjua | 4:31 |
| 2. | "Ishq Jo Karein" | KK | 5:01 |
| 3. | "Ishq Teri Leela" | Kamaal Khan | 6:21 |
| 4. | "Habibi" | Sunidhi Chauhan | 4:12 |
