= Meri Shadi Karao =

- Directed by: Syed Noor
- Written by: Syed Noor
- Story by: Syed Noor
- Produced by: Daler Mehndi; Syed Noor
- Starring: Gurdeep Mehndi; Radhika Vaid; Manoj Pahwa; Nikki Mehndi; Umar; Tahir Naushad
- Music by: Daler Mehndi; Gurdeep Mehndi
- Distributed by: T-Series
- Release date: 4 January 2013
- Running time: 110 mins
- Country: India
- Language: Hindi

Meri Shadi Karao (transl. Marry me off!) is a 2013 Hindi Bollywood comedy film directed by Syed Noor and produced by Daler Mehndi, under "Mehndi Production" and "Paragon Entertainment Group" banners. Gurdeep Mehndi, Radhika Vaid and Manoj Pahwa in lead role.

== Cast ==
- Gurdeep Mehndi.... Gurdeep
- Radhika Vaid.... Radhika
- Manoj Pahwa.... Kalyan
- Nikki Mehndi.... Preetam
- Sakhawat Naz
- Umar
- Ravinder Paul
- Tahir Naushad

== Soundtrack ==
- "Tenu Ki" - Gurdeep Mehndi
- "Jean Shean Pake" - Gurdeep Mehndi, Rap By – Arya
- "Meri Shadi Karao" - Daler Mehndi
- "Dil Ne Mana" - Gurdeep Mehndi, Rap By – Gora Singh
- "Dil Vil Ke" - Gurdeep Mehndi
- "Naina" - Harjeet Mehndi
- "Guru Ramdas Rakho Sharnai" - Kishan Pal

== Critical reception ==
Renuka Vyavahare of Times of India gave 1.5 out of 5 stars and quoted, "The music of the film is decent. While the film isn't revolting or something equally bad, there's nothing much for you to get entertained by either. The film could have probably been better, had it been in Punjabi."
