= Giorgia Andriani =

Italian model, actress and dancer

- Born: May 21, 1989 (age 37)
- Education: London Metropolitan University
- Occupations: Model, actress, and dancer
- Years active: 2017–present
- Notable work: Karoline Kamakshi
- Height: 175 cm (5 ft 9 in)

Giorgia Andriani (born 21 May 1989) is an Italian model, actress and dancer who primarily works in the Indian cinema. She is known for her modelling work, her titular role in the Tamil-language action-comedy web series Karoline Kamakshi (2019), and her appearances in various Bollywood films and music videos.

== Early life and education ==
Giorgia Andriani was born on 21 May 1989, and grew up in Milan and Brindisi, Italy. She moved across Europe, living in Germany and Spain before relocating to London, where she studied filmmaking. Her interest in Indian culture subsequently led her to move to India in 2016.

She is a formally trained dancer and has explored and trained for Indian classical dance forms such as Kathak, in addition to Western dance styles.

== Career ==
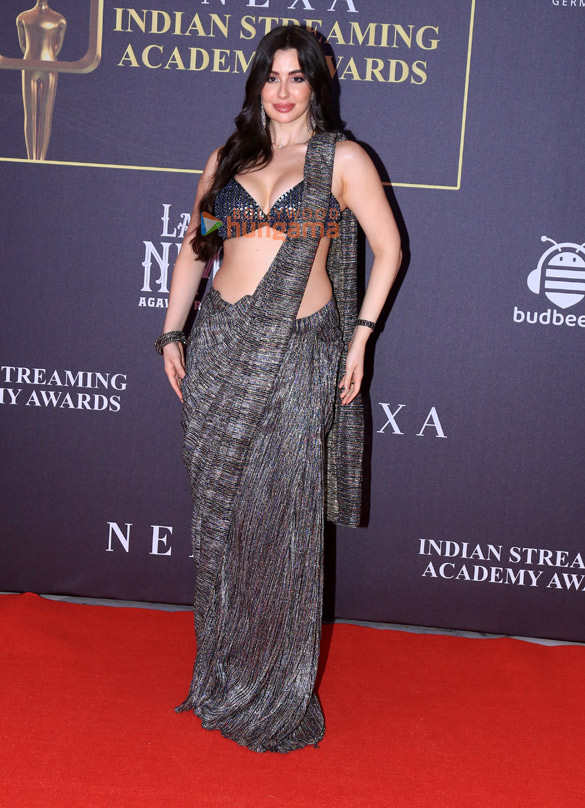
Andriani at the NEXA Indian Streaming Academy Awards 2025

She began her professional career in Europe as a model. In 2017, she was involved in the Hindi-language film Guest in London, credited as an assistant director. The same year, she worked on the film I Love You Truly as a production assistant. In 2019, she made her acting debut in Indian entertainment industry with a Tamil-Telugu bilingual web series Karoline Kamakshi. She played the title role of Karoline, a French undercover agent, in this action-comedy series. In 2020, Andriani appeared in the Hindi drama film Sridevi Bungalow.

Andriani made her Bollywood debut in Non-Stop Dhamaal (2023), a comedy film where she played a supporting role and the lead dancer in the Item number "Dil Ke Andar". She later worked in Welcome to Bajrangpur, alongside Shreyas Talpade, and Kannada action film Martin. The film featured her in a supporting role, and as the lead dancer in the item number "Jasmine Song", choreographed by Imran Sardhariya, where she was the lead dancer along with 350 additional dancers marking her first appearance in Kannada cinema.

In addition to her work in film and streaming projects, Andriani has appeared in several Indian music videos. In 2023, she featured in "Dil Jisse Zinda Hai" by Jubin Nautiyal and "Biba", performed by Sachet Tandon alongside Mohd Danish, Shadab Faridi, Altamash Faridi, Lijo George, and DJ Chetas, both released by T-Series. In 2024, she appeared in "Roop Tera Mastana" by Mika Singh under Saregama Music, "Daaru" by Deep Jandu, "Wapas Na Aayenge" by Milind Gaba released by T-Series, and "Little Star" by Shehbaz Badesha released under the banner of Shehnaaz Gill.

She is scheduled to appear in Mother Land: Honour and Valour, an announced action-drama film currently in production.

== Media image ==
Andriani has spoken publicly regarding the portrayal of women in dance sequences in Indian films.

== Filmography ==
=== Films ===
| Year | Title | Role | Language | Notes | Ref |
|---|---|---|---|---|---|
| 2017 | Guest iin London | Line producer and assistant director | Hindi | | |
| 2020 | Victim | Lawyer | | Short film | |
| 2020 | Sridevi Bungalow | Sridevi | Hindi | | |
| 2023 | Non Stop Dhamaal | Supporting role and the lead dancer in "Dil Ke Andar" | Hindi | | |
| 2024 | Martin | Supporting role and the lead dancer in "Jasmine Song" | Kannada | First appearance in Kannada cinema. | |
| 2025 (announced) | Mother Land: Honour and Valour | Role not yet disclosed | Hindi | Under Production | |

=== Television / Web series ===
| Year | Title | Role | Lang | Platf. |
|---|---|---|---|---|
| 2019 | Karoline Kamakshi | Karoline (Titular role) | Tamil | ZEE5 |

=== Music videos ===
| Year | Title | Singer(s) | Platform | Ref. |
|---|---|---|---|---|
| 2023 | Biba | Sachet Tandon DJ Chetas Shadab Faridi | T-Series | |
| 2023 | Dil Jisse Zinda Hai | Jubin Nautiyal | T-Series | |
| 2024 | Daaru | Deep Jandu | Geet MP3 | |
| 2024 | Roop Tera Mastana | Mika Singh | Saregama Music | |
| 2024 | Wapas Na Aayenge | Milind Gaba | T-Series | |
| 2024 | Little Star | Shehbaz Badesha | Shehnaaz Gill | |
