= Vrajesh Hirjee =

Indian film and television actor and comedian (born 1971)

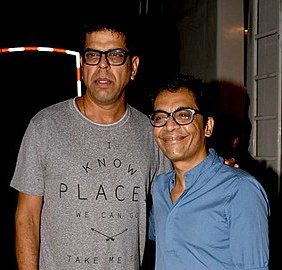
- Murali Sharma and Hirjee (right) on the sets of Golmaal Again in 2017
- Born: 16 June 1971 (age 55); Mumbai, Maharashtra, India
- Occupations: Actor; TV presenter Comedian; Script writer Dubbing artist
- Years active: 1995–present
- Spouse: Rohini Banerjee (m. 2015)

Vrajesh Hirjee (born 16 June 1971) is an Indian film and television actor and comedian. He is also a script writer, dubbing artist and doing commentary in Vivo Pro Kabaddi League Season 9. He has acted in Hindi language films like Rehna Hai Tere Dil Mein, Kaho Naa Pyaar Hai, Mujhe Kucch Kehna Hai, Golmaal Fun Unlimited, Golmaal Returns and Tum Bin.

He was last seen in a stand-up comedy show Goodnight India that premiered on Sony SAB.

== Early life ==
Vrajesh was born and grew up in Kalbadevi, Mumbai, India. He has a sister, Pushtiie Shakti, also a television actress.

== Career ==
He is an AIESEC Alumnus. Vrajesh made his debut as a stage artist in 1998. Rehnaa Hai Terre Dil Mein, Yeh Hai Mumbai Meri Jaan, Krishna Cottage, Heyy Babyy, and Krrish 3 are some of the notable films he acted in. He is best known for his role of Pandurang in Golmaal: Fun Unlimited and Pandu (Nagbaba) in the fourth installment of the Golmaal franchise Golmaal Again.

Vrajesh Hirjee comes from the field of advertising having worked with top advertising agencies like Everest as a copywriter. Apart from working in India as a dubbing artist on Hollywood movies like Johnny English Reborn and Pirates of the Caribbean, Vrajesh has appeared in many television shows like Sorry Meri Lorry and Jassi Jaissi Koi Nahin. He was also seen in the sixth season of reality television game show Bigg Boss.

== Personal life ==
Hirjee married actor Rohini Banerjee in 2015, with whom he has a son born in 2019.

== Filmography ==
=== Film ===
Year	Title	Role	Notes	Ref.
1998	Such a Long Journey	Sohrab		
2000	Dahshat			
2000	Kaho Naa... Pyaar Hai	Tony		
2000	Refugee	BSF Officer		
2001	Aashiq			
2001	Ek Rishtaa			
2001	Mujhe Kucch Kehna Hai			
2001	Tum Bin			
2001	Aks	R&AW Officer 1		
2001	Dil Ne Phir Yaad Kiya	Charlie		
2001	Rehnaa Hai Terre Dil Mein	Vicky		
2002	Kya Yehi Pyaar Hai	Sundar		
2003	Talaash: The Hunt Begins...	Pepsi		
2003	Kucch To Hai	Pat		
2004	Muskaan	Satin		
2004	Krishna Cottage	Puneet Kumar 'P.K.' Tali		
2004	Lakeer – Forbidden Lines	Brij		
2004	Shart: The Challenge			
2006	Fanaa	Balwant		
2006	Golmaal: Fun Unlimited	Pandurang		
2006	Apna Sapna Money Money			
2007	Salaam-E-Ishq	Prem		
2007	Heyy Babyy	Ajay Shah		
2008	Sunday	Chakki		
2008	Hulla	Dev		
2008	Mr. White Mr. Black	Sardarji		
2008	Golmaal Returns	Anthony Gonsalves/Atmaram		
2008	One Two Three			
2009	Daddy Cool	Jim		
2009	Dil Bole Hadippa!	Chamkila		
2009	All the Best: Fun Begins	Vrajesh		
2010	Golmaal 3	Teja		
2012	Dekho Ye Hai Mumbai Real Life			
2012	Kalpvriksh			
2012	Teri Meri Kahaani	Journalist		
2012	Joker			
2013	Krrish 3			
2013	Mahabharat	Dushasana	voice role	
2014	Mr Joe B. Carvalho			
2014	Apne To Dhirubhai		Gujarati language film	
2015	Chal Guru Ho Jaa Shuru			
2016	Santa Banta Pvt Ltd			
2017	Thug Life	Rap singer	Punjabi film	
2017	Golmaal Again	Pandurang		
2017	Prakash Electronic			
2018	Mangal Ho	Shakti Armstrong		
2022	Cirkus	Naag Mani		
2024	Vijay 69	Coach Vishwas	Netflix film	
2025	Saale Aashiq	Subhash Kamat		
2026	Firki		Gujarati film	
TBA	Tomchi		Completed; Unreleased	

=== Television ===
Year	Title	Role	Notes
1995	Sorry Meri Lorry		
1997	Kya Baat Hai	Dayaram Mehta	
1998	X Zone	various characters	Episode 81,96 & 123
1999	Gubbare		
2000	Star Bestsellers		Story "Govind Aur Ganesh"
2000	Rishtey		Story "Shanno"
2001	Yeh Hai Mumbai Meri Jaan	Hariprasad	
2001	C.A.T.S		
2002	Yeh Hai Mumbai Meri Jaan		
2003	Jassi Jaissi Koi Nahin		
2004-2005	Dum Dama Dum	Host/presenter	
2006-2008	The Man's World Show	Host/presenter	
2009	Shree Adi Manav	Adi	
2011	Zor Ka Jhatka: Total Wipeout	Contestant	
2012	Bhai Bhaiya Aur Brother	Sameer Mahendra Patel	
2012	Upanishad Ganga	Ashtavakra	
2012	The Suite Life of Karan & Kabir	Digital	
2012	Bigg Boss 6	Contestant	Evicted on day 61
2013	Time Out with Imam	Himself	
2014–2015	Private Investigator	Inspector A K Tiwari	
2018	Partners - Trouble Ho Gayi Double	Nagesh	

== Dubbing roles ==
=== Live action films ===
Film title	Actor(s)	Character	Dub Language	Original Language	Original Year release	Dub Year release	Notes
Johnny English Reborn	Rowan Atkinson	Johnny English	Hindi	English	2011	2011	Released in some countries as Johnny English Returns.
Pirates of the Caribbean: On Stranger Tides	Stephen Graham	Scrum	Hindi	English	2011	2011	Vrajesh is also the Hindi translator of this film.
Pirates of the Caribbean: Dead Men Tell No Tales	Stephen Graham	Scrum	Hindi	English	2017	2017	

=== Animated films ===
Film title	Original Voice(s)	Character	Dub Language	Original Language	Original Year Release	Dub Year Release	Note
Incredibles 2	Samuel L. Jackson	Lucius Best / Frozone	Hindi	English	2018	2018	

== See also ==
- Dubbing (filmmaking)
- List of Indian dubbing artists

== Awards ==
Year	Award	Category	Serial	Outcome
2002	Indian Telly Awards	Best Actor in a Comic Role	Yeh Hai Mumbai Meri Jaan	Nominated
