= Bade Dilwala =

- Poster
- Directed by: Shakeel Noorani
- Written by: Shakeel Noorani
- Produced by: Shakeel Noorani
- Starring: Sunil Shetty; Priya Gill
- Narrated by: Sachin Khedekar
- Cinematography: Dinesh Telkar
- Edited by: Sudhir Verma
- Music by: Aadesh Shrivastava
- Release date: 22 January 1999 (India)
- Running time: 152 mins
- Country: India
- Language: Hindi

Bade Dilwala (transl. Magnanimous) is a 1999 Indian Hindi-language romance film produced and directed by Shakeel Noorani. The film is a remake of the 1994 American film It Could Happen to You. It stars Sunil Shetty and Priya Gill in pivotal roles.

== Plot ==
Police inspector Ram (Sunil Shetty) is a man of his word. His wife Manthara (Archana Puran Singh) is obsessed with money and neglects her family in pursuit of getting rich quick. She forces Ram to buy a lottery ticket and he obliges. When he goes into a restaurant for a snack, he finds that he has no money to tip the waitress Piya (Priya Gill). He promises her half the money if he ever wins the lottery. And to his surprise, he does! But Manthara is not about to give up half of this windfall so easily and as Ram and Piya get closer to each other, they discover a growing attraction.

== Cast ==
- Sunil Shetty as Police Inspector Ram Prasad
- Priya Gill as Piya Verma
- Paresh Rawal as Mannubhai Rajnikant Shroff
- Archana Puran Singh as Manthara, Ram's wife
- Satish Kaushik as Police Inspector Iqbal Shaikh
- Ranjeet as Prosecuting Attorney
- Raju Srivastava as Actor
- Rashid Khan as Sanju Baba
- Guddi Maruti as Zarine
- Raju Kher as Motilal Bihari
- Sachin Khedekar as Narrator

== Soundtrack ==
Song	Singer
"Apne Mehboob Ki"	Udit Narayan, Alka Yagnik
"Baant Raha Tha"	Udit Narayan, Alka Yagnik, Shankar Mahadevan
"Bhadke Aag"	Jaspinder Narula
"Bhadke Aag"	Shankar Mahadevan
"Jawan Jawan"	Hariharan, Alka Yagnik
"Mujhe Aisa Ladka"	Alka Yagnik
"Tu Tu Ru"	Udit Narayan, Sunidhi Chauhan

== Reception ==
Deccan Herald wrote, "It’s an elegant film, which works magic by simply moving at a leisurely pace".
