= Jessu Jordaar =

2021 Gujarati Film

- Directed by: Rajan Verma
- Written by: Bunty Rathore; Rajan Verma
- Produced by: Shobhna Bhupat Bodar
- Starring: Manoj Joshi; Supriya Kumari; Kuldeep Gor; Rishikesh Ingley; Bhakti Kubavat; Dhyey Mehta
- Edited by: Ankit H. Brahmbhatt; Pratik Patil
- Music by: Danish Iqbal Sabri
- Release date: 1 October 2021
- Country: India
- Language: Gujarati

Jessu Jordaar is a 2021 Gujarati-language romantic comedy film directed by Rajan Verma. The film is produced by Shobhna Bhupat Bodar and co-produced by Vrunda Brahmbhatt. The film stars Kuldeep Gor, Bhakti Kubavat, Dhyey Mehta, Rishikesh Ingley, Manoj Joshi, and Supriya Kumari.

== Cast ==
- Kuldeep Gor
- Bhakti Kubavat
- Dhyey Mehta
- Ishikesh Ingley
- Manoj Joshi
- Supriya Kumari
- Nilesh Pandya
- Saloni Raval

== Soundtrack ==
Jessu Jordaar

Soundtrack album by Danish Iqbal Sabri
- Released: 2021
- Genre: Feature film soundtrack
- Length: 5:31

The soundtrack of Jessu Jordaar consists of 2 songs music by Danish Iqbal Sabri and written by Danish Iqbal Sabri.

Track list
| No. | Title | Lyrics | Music | Length |
|---|---|---|---|---|
| 1. | "Vaalam-Su Thayu" | Danish Iqbal Sabri | Danish Iqbal Sabri | 2:28 |
| 2. | "Kia Ni Gaadi" | Danish Iqbal Sabri | Danish Iqbal Sabri | 3:03 |
