= Rohini Banerjee =

Indian actress and model

- Born: Bengal, India
- Occupation(s): Actress, Model
- Years active: 2008–present
- Height: 5 ft 3 in (1.60 m)
- Spouse: Vrajesh Hirjee (m. 2015)

Rohini Banerjee is an Indian actress and model who stars in Indian TV serials. She is widely known for her performance as "Malti" in Saas Bina Sasural which was telecast on Sony Entertainment Television India.

== Early life ==
Born in Bengal, Rohini Banerjee started her career as a model after pursuing an MBA in marketing.

She was a participant queen in a number of beauty pageants, including Miss Suburbs, Miss Maharashtra Runner Up, Campus Princess 98, and Miss Valentine. She was also the runner up-in Star Miss India.

== Career ==
After gaining recognition as a popular model and doing a number of ramp shows, Rohini was invited to be in a music video of Bappi Lahiri. She also endorsed a number of products, including Rexona deo, Frooti, Complan, and Blue Riband gin. The regional campaign she did in Calcutta for Thumbs Up also received wide attention.

After playing a number of characters in leading television shows, including Rishtey, Zor Ka Jhatka, and Colgate Top10 (anchor), it was the TV serial Saas Bina Sasural which gave a major break in her career. It was produced by Optimistix Entertainment and aired on Sony Entertainment Television India. Rohini played the role of Malti, the eldest daughter-in-law of the family. Her performance was received with positive responses and wide acclaim. It also paved the way for her to be part of the show Chhanchhan which was also from the same crew where she played the role of Kaumudi.

She also played the lead role in the short film The Mumbai Trilogy. This was an anthology of three short stories, and she was featured in the story "The Oppurtunist".

== Personal life ==
Rohini has been dating Gujarati actor Vrajesh Hirjee since 2011 and married him in a traditional Bengali wedding in 2015. They have a son.

=== Television ===
- Rishtey
- Zor Ka Jhatka
- Colgate Top10
- Saas Bina Sasural as Malti Pashupatinath Chaturvedi
- Chhanchhan as Kaumudi Borisagar
- Vishkanya...Ek Anokhi Prem Kahani as Kalpana Ghosh
