= Non Stop Dhamaal =

- Theatrical release poster
- Directed by: Irshad Khan
- Story by: Irshad Khan
- Produced by: Suresh Gondaliya
- Starring: Annu Kapoor; Manoj Joshi; Rajpal Yadav; Asrani; Priyanshu Chatterjee; Rajesh Jais
- Cinematography: Akash Tiwari
- Edited by: Chandan Arora
- Music by: Rahul Bhatt
- Production company: Triyom Films
- Release date: 18 August 2023
- Country: India
- Language: Hindi

Non-Stop Dhamaal is a 2023 Indian Hindi-language comedy film produced by Triyom Films and directed by Irshad Khan. The film was theatrically released on 18 August 2023. It marks the penultimate film role of Asrani before his death on 20 October 2025.

== Synopsis ==
Non-Stop Dhamaal is a family entertainer set against the backdrop of the film industry. The story revolves around Satinder, a visionary film director with ambitious dreams of collaborating with renowned stars, teams up with his friend Amar, a struggling film writer, to secure an investor for their new project. Jassu Bhai, along with his business partner Khattri, offers to support the film for a special reason. Meanwhile, Raju Bhangarwala, a devoted fan of the popular actress Shreya Kapoor, navigates the streets of Mumbai, following his destiny. As the story progress their needs, dreams, and challenges, compel them to come together, embarking on a roller-coaster journey filled with confusion, emotions, and an abundance of comedy.

== Cast ==
- Annu Kapoor as Satinder
- Manoj Joshi as Amar
- Rajpal Yadav as Raju Bhangarwala
- Asrani as Jassu Bhai
- Priyanshu Chatterjee as Khatri
- Vikram Kochher as Shareef
- Rajesh Jais as Mr Bansal
- Shreyas Talpade as himself
- Kamlesh Sawant as Inspector Gaitonde
- Rajeev Nigam as Salim Tempo
- Dev Sharma as Hiten
- Kurush Deboo as Dilzaan Daruwala
- Hemant Pandey as film distributor
- Sheena Bajaj as Kaaya
- Veronica Vanij as Shreya Kapoor
- Payel Mukherjee as film actress
- Giorgia Andriani in special item number "Dil Ke Andar"

== Production ==
Produced under the banner of Triyom Films, produced by Suresh Gondalia and directed, story, dialogue and lyrics by Irshad Khan and screenplay by Irshad Khan and Vikash Kumar Vishwakarma. Music is given By Rahul Bhatt and background score by Anamik Chauhan. Cinematography by Akash Aditya Tiwari and editing by Chandan Arora. The film has been shot at various locations in Mumbai. Non-Stop Dhamaal was released in screens on 18 August 2023.

== Soundtrack ==
No.	Title	Singer(s)	Length
1.	"Mustaqbil"	Javed Ali
2.	"Kadki Me Jeena"	Rupantika Papori, Altamsh Firdi
3.	"Dil Ke Andar"	Ritik Pathak, Aaman Trikha
