= Rachana Maurya =

Indian actress, model and dancer

- Born: Mumbai, Maharashtra, India
- Other name: Rachna
- Occupations: Actress, model
- Years active: 2005–present

Rachana Maurya is an Indian actress, model and dancer who has appeared in music videos and performed item numbers in various Indian films. She is probably best known for her performances in Dus, Souryam and Yavarum Nalam.

== Filmography ==
Year	Film	Role	Language	Notes
2005	Dus		Hindi	Special appearance
2005	Aashiq Banaya Aapne		Hindi	Special appearance
2006	Uppi Dada M.B.B.S.		Kannada	Special appearance
2006	Ganda Hendathi		Kannada	Special appearance
2006	Iqraar By Chance		Hindi	
2006	Fight Club: Members Only		Hindi	
2006	Bangaram		Telugu	Special appearance
2006	Aisa Kyon Hota Hai?		Hindi	
2007	Chotta Mumbai		Malayalam	Special appearance
2007	Dhol		Hindi	Special appearance
2008	Andamaina Abbadam		Telugu	Special appearance
2008	Yaaradi Nee Mohini		Tamil	Special appearance
2008	Accident		Kannada	Special appearance
2008	Salam Hyderabad		Telugu	
2008	Somberi		Telugu	
2008	Ellam Avan Seyal		Tamil	Special appearance
2008	Souryam		Telugu	Special appearance
2008	Sangathi		Kannada	Special appearance
2008	Victory		Telugu	Special appearance
2008	Nayagan		Tamil	Special appearance
2008	Silambattam		Tamil	Special appearance
2009	Yavarum Nalam		Tamil	Special appearance
2009	13B		Hindi	Special appearance
2009	The Stoneman Murders		Hindi	Special appearance
2009	Mitrudu		Telugu	
2009	Aa Okkadu		Telugu	
2009	Giliginthalu		Telugu	
2009	Junglee		Kannada	
2009	Salute		Kannada	Special appearance
2009	Naan Avanillai 2	Maria	Tamil	
2010	Pokkiri Raja		Malayalam	Special appearance
2010	Preethiya Theru		Kannada	Special appearance
2010	Gubbi		Kannada	Special appearance
2010	Kari Chirathe		Kannada	
2010	Drohi		Tamil	Special appearance
2010	Vandae Maatharam		Tamil	Special appearance
2010	Punda		Kannada	Special appearance
2011	Aayiram Vilakku		Tamil	
2011	Gun		Kannada	Special appearance
2011	Kote		Kannada	Special appearance
2011	Rama Rama Raghu Rama		Kannada	
2011	Vanthaan Vendraan		Tamil	Special appearance
2012	Nandeeshwarudu		Telugu	Special appearance
2012	Dammu		Telugu	Special appearance
2012	Mr. 7		Telugu	Special appearance
2012	Sudigadu		Telugu	
2012	Em Babu Laddu Kavalaa	Nandini	Telugu	
2013	Puthagam	Dolly	Tamil	
2013	Okkadine		Telugu	Special appearance
2013	Rajani Kantha		Kannada	
2013	Pyarge Aagbittaite		Kannada	Special appearance
2013	Chatrapathi		Kannada	
2013	Aadu Magaadra Bujji		Telugu	
2014	Nedunchaalai		Tamil	Special appearance
2014	Athithi		Tamil	Special appearance

== Music videos ==
- Thodi Mila De Tu (Soda Whiskey) - Rishi Singh (Album: Desi)
- My Name is Ajitabh - Ajitabh Ranjan
- Maya the Illusion - Rahul Sharma
- Pallo Latke - Sanyh Rawani (Album: Max It Sanyh)
- Nishani - Jassi Sohal
- Tere Naal Nachna - Sukhbir
- Meri Jaan Neh - Mehsopuria (Album: Warrior)
- Main Hogaya Sharabbi - Panjabi MC (Album: Steel Battle)
- Phullan Wangu - Jassi Sohal (Album: Nishani)
- Birkan - Raminder Bhuller (Album: Vanjli Wala)
- Dil Nashe Mein Choor Hai - Kumar Sanu (Album: Dil Nashe Mein Choor Hai)
- Bandeya Ho (Remix) - DJ Suketu & DJ AKS
