= Manjul Sinha =

Indian television director (died 2025)

Manjul Sinha (died 15 January 2025) was an Indian television director.

== Life and career ==
Sinha always wanted to be a director, having grown up in a prominent family who had keen interest in films, having a cinema hall at Patna, film distribution and interests in Bhojpuri films.

After passing high school from sainik school tilaiya and later graduating from the Film and Television Institute of India in Pune in 1977 Manjul Sinha came to Bombay in pursuit of a career in direction. After directing many small television advertisements, his first major break was with Yeh Jo Hai Zindagi, which was among the first sitcoms on Indian television. At that time Indian television viewership was seeing a new dawn, colour television having just arrived, and Yeh Jo Hai Zindagi became very popular: cinema halls ran empty during the half-hour show on Friday night.

Later, Sinha was involved in making Yeh Hai Mumbai Meri Jaan, another television serial.

He mentored many upcoming filmmakers, writers and actors, notable amongst whom is Vipul K Rawal of Iqbal fame.

In 2004 he was included on the panel of judges for the 29th Radio and Television Advertising Practitioners' Association of India (RAPA) awards.

Sinha died from a heart attack on 15 January 2025 in Goa.
