= Pushtaini =

2024 Hindi drama film

- Theatrical release poster
- Directed by: Vinod Rawat
- Written by: Vinod Rawat; Rita Heer
- Produced by: Ankit Gandhi; Vinod Rawat
- Starring: Vinod Rawat; Rita Heer; Ankur Bhalla; Hemant Pandey; Preme Karayat; Maya Dharakoti; Mithilesh Pandey
- Cinematography: Dhawalika Singh
- Edited by: Charu Takkar
- Music by: Krishna Purohit
- Production companies: Lotus Dust Pictures, VinRaw Films
- Release date: 21 June 2024
- Country: India
- Language: Hindi

Pushtaini is a 2024 Hindi drama film directed by Vinod Rawat and produced by Ankit Gandhi and Vinod Rawat under the banners Lotus Dust Pictures and VinRaw Films. The film stars Vinod Rawat, Rita Heer, Ankur Bhalla, Hemant Pandey, Preme Karayat, Maya Dharakoti, and Mithilesh Pandey. It also features Rajkummar Rao in a cameo.

== Plot summary ==
The story revolves around a struggling actor named Bhuppi (played by Vinod Rawat) who, after getting caught in an embarrassing scandal, decides to visit his Himalayan hometown. Unaware of what the journey has in store for him, Bhuppi faces his past and undergoes a transformative experience.

== Cast ==
- Vinod Rawat as Bhuppi
- Rita Heer as Dimple
- Rajkummar Rao as Ankur Bhalla
- Hemant Pandey as Bhuppi's childhood friend and taxi driver
- Mithilesh Pandey as Yashpal, Bhuppi's father's employer

== Production ==
The film was released on 21 June 2024. It is a production of Lotus Dust Pictures and VinRaw Films.

== Critical reception ==
Ronak Kotecha of Times of India rated Pushtaini 2.5 out of 5, noting, "In essence, Pushtaini unfolds as a deeply personal journey, constrained by its own narrative limitations. Rawat's directorial debut attempts to weave a tapestry of themes—past regrets, present struggles, and future aspirations—yet occasionally feels tangled within its own web."

Anuj Kumar of The Hindu praised the film, stating, "Pushtaini is better than many decorative products on display in theatres at present. One hopes it finds a way through the heartless distribution system that is skewed towards tentpoles and where ancestral hold on the system still works."

Tanushree Ghosh of Money Control remarked, "Vinod Rawat’s gentle story of homecoming and hill life is inspiriting yet bumpy."

Deepa Gahlot from Scroll described Pushtaini as "a blend of melancholy with gentle humour. A newbie enthusiasm makes the film a surprisingly satisfying watch. No expectations are raised, so none are dashed."

Rohit Bhatnagar of Free Press Journal awarded the film 3 out of 5 stars, stating, "Pushtaini is a great effort, and the highlight is the performances by the real family members."

Soumyabrata Gupta from Times Now rated it 4 out of 5, writing, "Pushtaini works partly because of Rawat’s stellar act as a man fighting his demons, but works more due to the supporting cast, many of whom are his real kin, who bring about a nonchalant innocence in their act."
