= Karoline Kamakshi =

Indian web series

- Release poster
- Genre: Action comedy
- Written by: Crazy Mohan
- Directed by: Vivek Kumar Kannan
- Starring: Meena; Giorgia Andriani
- Country of origin: India
- Original language: Tamil
- No. of seasons: 1
- No. of episodes: 10 (list of episodes)

Production
- Producer: Rudrapati Ramana Rao
- Cinematography: Balaji K Raja
- Editor: Madan
- Production company: Trend Loud

Original release
- Release: 5 December 2019

Karoline Kamakshi is a 2019 Tamil-language action comedy streaming television series starring Meena and Giorgia Andriani. The series is the first South Indian venture of the Bollywood actor Andriani. Karoline Kamashki was released on ZEE5 on 5 December 2019.

== Synopsis ==
Karoline, a French detective and Kamakshi, a CBI officer are required to work together to catch the international bootlegger, Furkin.

== Cast ==
- Meena as Agent Kamakshi, a clumsy, timid and lazy CBI Officer who is sent on the quest to retrieve the stolen Virgin Mary artefact from Furkhin.
- Giorgia Andriani as Agent Karoline, an alcoholic French Secret Agent who is also sent on the quest to retrieve he stolen Virgin Mary artefact from Furkhin as Kamakshi's partner.
- Y. G. Mahendran as Chidhambharam, Director of the Indian CBI and Kamakshi's mentor
- Veena Angelina Sweety as Victoria, Furkhin's Gun Moll and Old Monk's girlfriend
- Anto Thomas as Furkhin, an international smuggler who smuggles and deals in artefacts, who steals the Virgin Mary from the National Museum of France
- Balaji Murugadoss as Vikram, Furkhin's new partner, who fools Karoline and Kamakshi pretending to be a police informer, who is the actual mastermind in the theft of the Virgin Mary and the Crown
- "Poraali" Dileepan as Inspector Kunju Mohan, a Pondichery Police Inspector tailing Karoline and Kamakshi on their mission
- Spike John as Old Monk, Furkhin's assistant and Karoline and Kamakshi's lead on the Virgin Mary
- TSR Srinivasan as Dr. Venkadam, a Veterinary Doctor who treats Old Monk
- K.P.Sathish as Sameer, an assassin hired by Fukhrin to assassinate Karoline and Kamakshi
- Prabhakar
- Raaghav as Kamakshi's husband
- Uma Sreenivasan as Kamakshi's mother-in-law
- Pranita N. as Mallika, Kamakshi's daughter

== Episodes ==
No.	Title	Directed by	Written by	Original release date
1	"Finding Virgin Mary"	Vivek Kumar Kannan	Crazy Mohan	5 December 2019
Kamakshi is given the responsibility of catching the international bootlegger, Furkin. It is said that Furkin had smuggled the Virgin Mary artefact from a museum in Paris. On the other side, Karoline, a French agent lands in Pondicherry for a vacation.
2	"French Toast(ed)"	Vivek Kumar Kannan	Crazy Mohan	5 December 2019
Kamakshi discovers that Karoline has been arrested by the police. The police agree to release Karoline on one condition. Karoline and Kamakshi are to pair up and find the drug lord, Furkin and locate the Virgin Mary.
3	"Liar, Liar!"	Vivek Kumar Kannan	Crazy Mohan	5 December 2019
Karoline traps Old Monk, Furkin's partner. However, Kamakshi fails at catching hold of Old Monk and he manages to escape. Karoline and Kamakshi quarrel and start hating each other.
4	"Pants on Fire!"	Vivek Kumar Kannan	Crazy Mohan	5 December 2019
Later, Kamakshi finds Old Monk but shoots him by mistake. Meanwhile, Furkin's new partner, Vikram, locates Karoline and Kamakshi and chases them.
5	"Drunken Brawl"	Vivek Kumar Kannan	Crazy Mohan	5 December 2019
Furkin's men chase Karoline and Kamakshi but they escape. The two head to the club and Kamakshi gets drunk. In the meantime, Furkin and his men reach the club and Kamakshi shoots Furkin.
6	"Secret Service"	Vivek Kumar Kannan	Crazy Mohan	5 December 2019
Furkin's men try to hunt down Karoline and Kamakshi. Karoline is informed about Furkin's men trying to chase them. Karoline and Kamakshi reach a safe place.
7	"Live and Let Die"	Vivek Kumar Kannan	Crazy Mohan	5 December 2019
Furkin's men find the hideout and reach the spot where Karoline and Kamakshi have been hiding. On the other hand, Furkin learns about the informer, Devaraj and kills him.
8	"A Botched Mission"	Vivek Kumar Kannan	Crazy Mohan	5 December 2019
The sniper captures Karoline and Kamakshi and shoots Vikram. Karoline and Kamakshi escape from the sniper but are caught in Kunjumohan's search activity. On the other hand, Furkin kills Victoria when he discovers she was a traitor.
9	"Deal with the Devil"	Vivek Kumar Kannan	Crazy Mohan	5 December 2019
Karoline and Kamakshi continue with their mission after escaping from the police. They also track Furkin's location and ask Chidambaram for his help for additional force.
10	"End Game"	Vivek Kumar Kannan	Crazy Mohan	5 December 2019
The final episode shows the battle between Karoline, Kamakshi and Furkin's men. Will the two win?

== Reception ==
The series opened to a negative response from audience and critics.
