= I.M.A. Gujju =

- Theatrical release poster
- Directed by: Nissu
- Written by: Nissu
- Screenplay by: Lizzu
- Produced by: Viral Jain
- Starring: Nissu; Manoj Joshi; Sunny Pancholi; Parth Thakar; Shriya Tiwari; Rushikesh Ingley
- Music by: Harshwardhan Dixit
- Production company: E3 Production
- Release date: 16 November 2018
- Running time: 134 minutes
- Country: India
- Language: Gujarati

I.M.A. Gujju is a 2018 Gujarati patriotic drama film, starring veteran Bollywood actor Rohit Roy, Manoj Joshi, Sunny Pancholi, Shriya Tiwari, Parth Thaker and Rushikesh Ingley. The film is directed by Sunny Pancholi and scheduled for release on 16 November 2018; it is produced by Viral Jain from E3 Productions. Nationwide Release by Rupam Entertainment.

== Cast ==
- Rohit Roy as Siddhraj Zala
- Manoj Joshi as Ramesh Shah
- Sunny Pancholi as Jay Shah
- Parth Thakar as Darbar
- Shriya Tiwari as Bhoomi
- Rushikesh Ingley as Aditya

== Plot ==
Nissu tries to find thepla everywhere in his vicinity, but is unable to do so. He meets the KGB, who kidnap him and ask him why he is searching for the theplas. His reply, resounding with Indian audiences: I AM A GUJJU.

== Crew ==
A Film by: Sunny Pancholi

Produced by: Viral Jain

Co Produced by: Ronak Bathani, Vimal B Bhalodiya, Vikram P Gojiya, Nitin A Kothari

Associate Director: Mahesh Chavan

DOP: Chandrakant Meher

Story: Sunny Pancholi

Screenplay: Akhilesh Tiwari, Sunny Pancholi

Art Director: Setu Upadhyay

== Production ==
=== Development ===
The film is produced Viral Jain from E3 Productions. The pre-production work of the film started in 2016 and shoot completed in three scheduled. Where main lead Sunny Pancholi has undergone the body transformation for this film and loved Ahmedabad during the festival season
