= Yeh Hai Mumbai Meri Jaan (TV series) =

Hindi-language comedy television series

- Written by: Rajesh Dubey
- Directed by: Manjul Sinha
- Starring: see below
- Country of origin: India
- Original language: Hindi
- No. of seasons: 1
- No. of episodes: 32

Production
- Producers: Rajat Sengupta; Rajesh Shuke
- Running time: 23 minutes
- Production company: Gayatri Telesoft Limited

Original release
- Network: Zee TV
- Release: 21 March – 24 October 2001

Yeh Hai Mumbai Meri Jaan is a Hindi-language comedy series that aired on Zee TV. The concept of this comedy draws greatly from the city of Mumbai - the melting pot of rural simplicity and urban complexity.

== Overview ==
The story revolves around a simple man, Hariprasad, who comes to Mumbai from a village in Jaunpur to fulfill his dream of becoming a glamour photographer. He has worked very hard to shed his small-town image, anglicised his name from Hariprasad to Harry and hates talking about his past. He tries to act as if he is from a foreign country. The story takes a twist when Hariprasad learns that his cousin, Balkrishna (Balu) is also coming to Mumbai to become a movie star. Sadly, Balu also gets a job where Harry works. Seeing Harry pretend to be a city slicker, Balu tries to expose the truth about his rural origins whenever they are together.

== Cast ==
- Varun Badola as Balkrishna (Balu)
- Sweta Keswani
- Vrajesh Hirjee as Hariprasad (Harry)
- Daisy Irani as Mrs. Desai
