= Manoj Joshi (actor) =

Indian actor (born 1965)

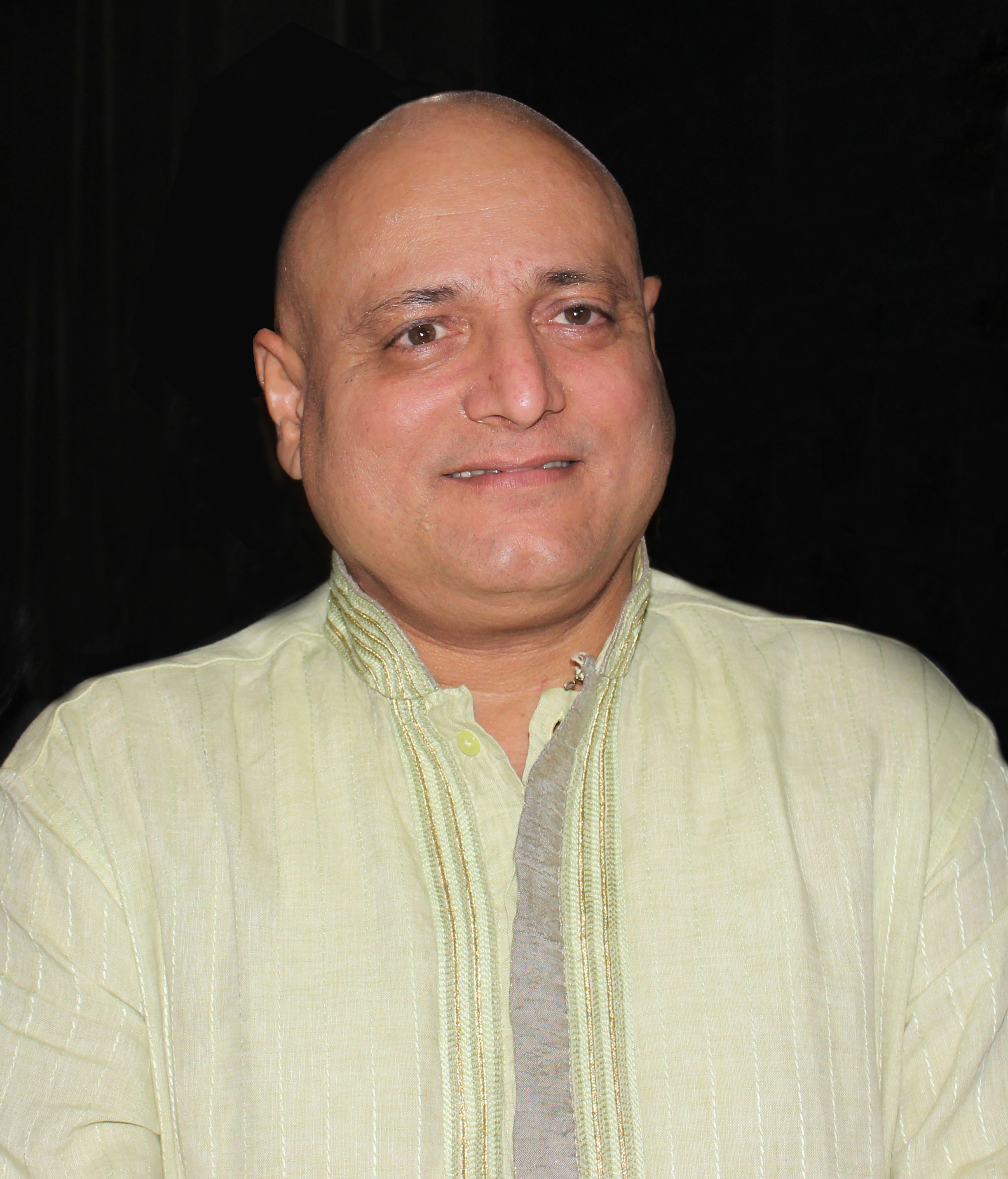
- Born: 14 December 1965 (age 60); Himmatnagar, Gujarat, India
- Education: B.A.
- Occupations: Actor; Comedian
- Years active: 1991–present
- Spouse: Charu Joshi
- Children: 2
- Relatives: Rajesh Joshi (brother)
- Honours: Padma Shri (2018)

Manoj N. Joshi (born 14 December 1965) is an Indian actor known for working in film, stage and television. He has acted in over 70 films since 1998, many of his roles being comic roles. Joshi is the recipient of several awards including a National Film Award. In 2018, Joshi was awarded with the Padma Shri. He is the vice-president of the Bombay Art Society.

After graduating from Sir J. J. School of Arts, he began his career in Marathi theatre, also putting up performances in Gujarati and Hindi theatre.

He acted in TV series including Chanakya, Ek Mahal Ho Sapno Ka, Rau (Marathi), Sangdil, Kabhi Souten Kabhi Saheli, Mura Raska Mai La (Marathi). He debuted in Sarfarosh (SI Bajju) alongside his brother who played Bala Thakur in the film. His other works include the film Hungama followed by Hulchul, Dhoom, Bhagam Bhag, Chup Chup Ke, Bhool Bhulaiyaa and Billu. He played the role of Chanakya in Chakravartin Ashoka Samrat. Joshi is popularly known for playing Kachra Seth in Phir Hera Pheri (2006).

== Filmography ==
Key
†	Denotes films that have not yet been released

Year	Title	Role	Language	Notes
1999	Sarfarosh	Sub-Inspector Bajju	Hindi	
2000	Aaghaaz	as assistant of Danny Mendoza, Johnny's younger brother	Hindi	
2001	Jaaneman Jaaneman	Belji Bhai	Hindi	
2001	Chandni Bar	Chandrakant Bhau	Hindi	
2002	Ab Ke Baras	Raghuvir Singh	Hindi	
2002	Devdas	Dwijdas Mukherjee	Hindi	
2003	Satta	Uddhav Pawar	Hindi	
2003	Hungama	Sub-Inspector Anand Waghmare	Hindi	
2003	Jogger's Park	Tariq Ahmed	Hindi/English	
2004	Aan: Men at Work	Manik Rao	Hindi	
2004	Dhoom	Shekhar Kamal	Hindi	
2004	Jaago	Advocate Satya Prakash Satwani	Hindi	
2004	Hulchul	Advocate Namdev Mishra	Hindi	
2005	Page 3	Bosco	Hindi	
2005	Shikhar	Amrit Patil	Hindi	
2005	Kyon Ki	P.K. Narayan (A Security Guard)	Hindi	
2005	Garam Masala	Nageshwar	Hindi	
2006	Phir Hera Pheri	Kachra Seth	Hindi	
2006	Chup Chup Ke	Pooja's father	Hindi	
2006	Golmaal: Fun Unlimited	Harishchandra Ramchandra Mirchandani "Harami"	Hindi	
2006	Vivah	Bhagat Ji (Matchmaker of Prem and Poonam)	Hindi	
2006	Bhagam Bhag	Manubhai Gandhi	Hindi	
2006	Humko Deewana Kar Gaye	Rasikbhai Galgalia	Hindi	
2007	Traffic Signal	Sailash Jha	Hindi	
2007	Buddha Mar Gaya	ACP Khandekar	Hindi	
2007	Guru	Ghanshyam Bhai	Hindi	
2008	Bhool Bhulaiyaa	Badrinath Chaturvedi	Hindi	
2008	Mr. White Mr. Black	Tulsi	Hindi	
2008	Mere Baap Pehle Aap	Chirag J. Rane	Hindi	
2008	Maan Gaye Mughal-e-Azam	Police Inspector Patil	Hindi	
2008	EMI: Liya Hai Toh Chukana Padega	Prem Prakash Patel	Hindi	
2008	Khallbali	KK	Hindi	
2009	Billu	Damodar Dubey	Hindi	
2009	De Dana Dan	Brij Mohan Oberoi	Hindi	
2010	Maniben.com	Bhadresh Bhai	Hindi	
2010	Kushti	Kripashankar	Hindi	
2010	Khatta Meetha	Trigun Fatak	Hindi	
2011	Dil Toh Baccha Hai Ji	Waiter	Hindi	
2011	Bin Bulaye Baraati	Loha Singh	Hindi	
2011	Ready	Bharat Kapoor	Hindi	
2011	Aaghaat	Dr. Seth	Marathi	
2011	Fakt Ladh Mhana	Veer Dhawal	Marathi	
2011	Balgandharva	Seth Laxmichand Narayan	Marathi	
2011	The Opportunist	The Opportunist	Hindi	
2012	Khiladi 786	Champaklal	Hindi	
2012	Dabangg 2	Baniya	Hindi	
2012	Gola Berij	Story teller	Marathi	
2012	Bharatiya	Prime Minister	Marathi	
2012	Lavu Ka Laath	Manoj	Marathi	
2013	Chaloo	Chief Minister	Hindi	
2013	Policegiri	Javeed Shiekh	Hindi	
2013	Wake Up India	Politician	Hindi	
2013	We Are On! Houn Jau Dya	Gujarathi	Marathi	
2013	Narbachi Wadi	Rangrao Khot/ Malhar Khot	Marathi	
2014	Mr Joe B. Carvalho	Commissioner Pandey	Hindi	
2014	Hasee Toh Phasee	Devesh Solanki	Hindi	
2014	Bey Yaar	Y. B. Gandhi	Gujarati	
2014	Yellow	Shekhar	Marathi	
2014	Spark	Anupama's father	Hindi	
2015	Dolly Ki Doli	Duby Ji	Hindi	
2015	I Love New Year	Randhir's friend	Hindi	
2015	Kis Kisko Pyaar Karoon	Deepika's father	Hindi	
2015	Prem Ratan Dhan Payo	Mr. Bhandari/Advocate of Pritampur Estate	Hindi	
2015	Bin Phere Free Me Ttere	Sunita's father	Hindi	
2015	Runh	Transgender	Marathi	
2016	Sanam Re	Akash's Boss	Hindi	
2016	Thai Jashe!	Chandrakantbhai Joshi	Gujarati	
2016	Lord Of Shingnapur	Rohit's father	Marathi	
2016	Ghayal Once Again	Minister	Hindi	
2017	Pappa Tamne Nahi Samjaay	Hasmukhlal Mehta	Gujarati	
2017	Judwaa 2	Alex's Mama	Hindi	
2017	Tamburo	Kirit Bhai	Gujarati	
2017	Dashakriya	Keshav Bhat	Marathi	
2018	Odiyan	Mootha Manickan (Muthappan)	Malayalam	
2018	Loveyatri	Nattu Kaka	Hindi	
2018	Fera Feri Hera Feri	Hasmukhlal Jobanputra	Gujarati	
2018	Kaashi in Search of Ganga	Kaashi's Lawyer	Hindi	
2018	Mantr	Shridhar Pant	Marathi	
2018	Natsamrat	Madhav	Gujarati	
2018	I.M.A. Gujju	Ramesh Shah	Gujarati	
2018	Truckbhar Swapna	Makhijani	Marathi	
2018	Bhonsle	Dhobi	Hindi	
2019	Ram Ki Janmabhoomi	Pandit Sadanand Shashtri	Hindi	
2019	Waah Zindagi	Jagat Shah	Hindi	
2019	PM Narendra Modi	Amit Shah	Hindi	
2019	Made in China	Vhinde Bhai	Hindi	
2019	Chasani	Ramniklal	Gujarati	
2020	Zol Zaal	Balwant Patil	Marathi	
2020	Coolie No. 1	Manager	Hindi	
2021	Hungama 2	Manasvit G. Bajaj	Hindi	
2021	Rashmi Rocket	Ramnik Virah Chibber	Hindi	
2021	Babloo Bachelor	Phopa	Hindi	
2021	Jessu Jordaar	Paresh Bhai	Gujarati	
2022	Petipack	Abhimanyu's Father	Gujarati	
2022	Nayika Devi: The Warrior Queen	Kumarpal	Gujarati	
2022	Jaadugar	Magician Chhabra	Hindi	Netflix film
2022	Love You Loktantra	CM Tyagi	Hindi	
2022	Dehati Disco	Mahant	Hindi	
2023	Gunchakkar	DSP Rajesh Ahire	Hindi	Short film on Amazon miniTV
2023	Hume Toh Loot Liya	Hasmukh	Hindi	MX Player film
2023	Lai Jhakaas	Vishwasrao	Marathi	
2023	Nava Pappa	Kanu Dharad	Gujarati	
2023	BhauBali	Bhau Awalaskar	Marathi	
2023	Jaggu Ani Juliet	Juliet's father	Marathi	
2023	Non Stop Dhamaal	Amar	Hindi	
2023	Dream Girl 2	Jaipal Srivastav	Hindi	
2023	Mystery of the Tattoo	Dr. Mark	Hindi	
2023	Darran Chhoo	Manav's father	Hindi	
2023	Khela Hobe	Bacchu Lal	Hindi	
2024	695	Advocate	Hindi	
2024	Janma Runn	Anna	Marathi	
2024	The UP Files	Abhay Singh	Hindi	
2024	Accident or Conspiracy: Godhra	Ravindra Pandya	Hindi	
2025	Match Fixing	Pervez Musharraf	Hindi	
2025	Sant Dnyaneshwaranchi Muktai	Brahmeshwar Shastri	Marathi	
2025	Sanghavi and Sons	Navneet Rai Sanghavi	Gujarati	
2025	Goti Lo	Nilkanthray Mehta - Dadaji	Gujarati	
2026	Bhooth Bangla	Govind Maharaj	Hindi	
2026	Krishnavataram Part 1: The Heart (Hridayam)	Ugrasena	Hindi	
2026	Tavvai	Maharaj	Hindi	

== Television serials ==
Year	Title	Role	Language	Notes
1991	Chanakya	Shriyak, Son of Shaktar	Hindi	
1998	Woh	Amit	Hindi	
1998	X Zone		Hindi	
1999-2003	Aabhalmaya	Sharad Joshi	Marathi	
1999–2002	Ek Mahal Ho Sapno Ka	Abhay Purshottam Nanavati	Hindi	
2000	Aahat	Jay	Hindi	Season 1 Episode 218 and 219
2000	Your Honour			
2001	Jaaneman Jaaneman		Hindi	
2002	Khichdi		Hindi	
2002–2005	Kehta Hai Dil	Mayor Bhandari	Hindi	
2004–2005	Yeh Meri Life Hai	Rasik Mehta	Hindi	
2006	Kasamh Se	Nishikant Dixit	Hindi	
2010–2011	Zindagi Ka Har Rang...Gulaal	Motabha	Hindi	
2015	Chakravartin Ashoka Samrat	Chanakya	Hindi	
2014–2016	Honar Soon Mi Hya Gharchi	Ramakant Gokhale	Marathi	
2018–2019	Mangalam Dangalam	Sanjeev Saklecha	Hindi	
2020	Yeh Rishta Kya Kehlata Hai	Advocate Shaktimaan Jhaveri	Hindi	
2022–2024	Swaraj: Bharat Ke Swatantrata Sangram ki Samagra Gatha	Narrator	Hindi	

== Personal life ==
Manoj Joshi was born in Himmatnagar, Gujarat into a Gujarati Brahmin family. His father was Navneet Joshi, and his younger brother late Rajesh Joshi was an actor too who died in 1998. Joshi hails from Adpodara village near Himatnagar in north Gujarat.

Joshi suffered a stroke while filming Devdas with Sanjay Leela Bhansali due to which he lost his vision and was bedridden for a year and a half.

== Awards ==
- Padma Shree Award on 69th Republic Day, 2018
- 64th National Film Awards
- National Film Award for Best Supporting Actor - Dashakriya.
- Indian Telly Award For Best Anchor in serial Swaraj
- In 2024, he served as member of the feature film jury of the Panorama section at the 55th International Film Festival of India.
