= Tere Mere Sapne (1996 film) =

1996 Indian film directed by Joy Augustine

- Theatrical release poster
- Directed by: Joy Augustine
- Written by: Ranjit Kapoor (dialogues)
- Screenplay by: Joy Augustine; Tigmanshu Dhulia
- Story by: Bharat Rangachary
- Produced by: Amitabh Bachchan
- Starring: Chandrachur Singh; Arshad Warsi; Priya Gill; Simran
- Narrated by: Amitabh Bachchan
- Cinematography: Teja
- Edited by: Adesh Verma
- Music by: Viju Shah
- Distributed by: ABCL Corp. Ltd.
- Release date: 6 December 1996
- Running time: 146 minutes
- Country: India
- Language: Hindi
- Budget: ₹3 crore
- Box office: est. ₹13.86 crore

Tere Mere Sapne (transl. Your Dreams and Mine) is a 1996 Indian Hindi-language romantic comedy-drama film directed by Joy Augustine and produced by Amitabh Bachchan's production company A. B. C. L. The film starred newcomers Chandrachur Singh, Arshad Warsi, Priya Gill and Simran.

== Plot ==
The plot of the movie is broadly similar to Mark Twain's The Prince and the Pauper. Two boys are born on the same day. One is Rahul Mehta, born with a silver spoon in his mouth to a rich family in England; another is Baalu, born in a middle-class Brahmin family somewhere in Mumbai. Both grow up until they are destined to exchange places on their 21st birthday.

Rahul's parents died when he was young, and he lives with his grandfather Shambunath Mehta. He wants to visit India to see his parents' graves though his grandfather doesn't want him to go. He is afraid Rahul may fall in love and ruin himself as his parents did. With much persuasion, he comes to India and manages to escape his guardians, Ram Singh and detective Mirchandani, at the airport and catches a taxi.

The driver of the taxi is none other than Baalu who, not knowing Rahul's true identity, keeps cursing the rich guy for being born on the same day as him and enjoying the wealthy life. Later, Rahul discloses his identity and Baalu feels ashamed, but both become good friends.

Rahul does not want to go back to his wealth-ridden world, so he asks Baalu to take his place and let him take Baalu's place. So, Rahul becomes the taxi driver and informs Ram Singh that someone will be coming to them in his place. Baalu reaches the hotel, and Ram Singh has a tough time grooming Baalu to behave like a rich guy.

Rahul goes to Baalu's place where he finds Baalu's sister Paro and falls in love with her. Baalu, while attending a meeting with V. P. Mathur, who is the caretaker of Mehta Industries in India, meets Mathur's daughter Pooja and falls in love with her.

Mehta industries are in shambles because of corrupt managers. The union leader Dattabhau explains this to Baalu (disguised as Rahul). Baalu takes care of this and reopens the company, declaring equal profit sharing among labourers.

At the Shastri's place, Paro's father P. V. Shastri learns of Rahul and Paro's love affair and is enraged since Rahul is a Christian. Baalu comes into the picture and pacifies the situation. Rahul decides to turn into a Brahmin so that he can marry Paro.

Rahul's grandfather in UK learns what is happening with Rahul and comes to India to control the situation. However, since the control of Mehta Industries has gone out of the Mathurs' hands, they decide to kill Rahul and Shambhunath. Rahul and Baalu fight to save Shambhuath from the gangster hired by the Mathurs to kill him.

The movie ends with Rahul's marriage with Paro and Baalu's marriage with Pooja.

== Cast ==
- Chandrachur Singh as Rahul Mehta
- Arshad Warsi as Balu Shastri
- Priya Gill as Paro Shastri
- Simran as Pooja Mathur
- Pran as Shambunath Mehta, Rahul's grandfather.
- Sulbha Arya as Mrs. Shastri
- Bal Dhuri as Ram Singh, Rahul's caretaker.
- Suresh Malhotra as V. P. Mathur
- Navtej Hundal as Senior Brahmin Pundit
- Pappu Polyester as S. C. Mathur
- Manoj Pahwa as Detective Mirchandani
- K. D. Chandran as P. V. Shastri
- A. K. Hangal as Dattabhau
- Master Frank Anthony as Murli

== Music ==
The music was composed by Viju Shah, with lyrics by Anand Bakshi. The soundtrack album, released by Amitabh Bachchan, sold 2.2 million units in India, making it the ninth best-selling Bollywood soundtrack of 1996. The song "Aankh Maarey" was remade for the 2018 film Simmba.

| # | Title | Singer(s) |
|---|---|---|
| 1. | "Tere Mere Sapne" | Udit Narayan, Vinod Rathod & Hema Sardesai |
| 2. | "Kuch Mere Dil Ne Kaha" | Hariharan & Sadhana Sargam |
| 3. | "Aankh Marey" | Kumar Sanu & Kavita Krishnamurthy |
| 4. | "Mere Piya" | Udit Narayan & Sadhana Sargam |
| 5. | "Rama O Rama" | Udit Narayan |
| 6. | "Mera Dil Gaya" | Udit Narayan & Alka Yagnik |

== Reception ==
Box Office India declared the film a hit.
