= Dehati Disco =

2022 Indian Hindi-language film by Ganesh Acharya

- official poster of Dehati Disco
- Directed by: Manoj Sharma
- Written by: Ganesh Acharya; Manoj Sharma
- Screenplay by: Manoj Sharma
- Story by: Ganesh Acharya
- Produced by: Vaseem Qureshi; Gitesh Chandrakar; Kamal Kishor Mishra
- Starring: Ganesh Acharya; Ravi Kishan; Manoj Joshi; Rajesh Sharma; Remo D'Souza; Sunil Pal; Saksham Sharma
- Cinematography: Kush Chhabria
- Edited by: Manoj Magar
- Music by: Drums Shivamani
- Production companies: Qureshi Productions; One Entertainment Film Productions
- Distributed by: Panorama Studios
- Release date: 27 May 2022
- Running time: 122 minutes
- Country: India
- Language: Hindi
- Box office: ₹0.10 cr.

Dehati Disco (transl. Rustic Disco) is a 2022 Indian Hindi-language dance film directed by Manoj Sharma and produced by Vaseem Qureshi, Gitesh Chandrakar, Kamal Kishor Mishra under the banner of Qureshi Productions Private Limited. The film revolves around the youth of the country who really enjoy dancing. Bollywood choreographer Ganesh Acharya plays the lead in the film.

== Cast ==
- Ganesh Acharya as Bhola
- Saksham Sharma as Bheema
- Ravi Kishan as Radhe
- Manoj Joshi as Mahant
- Rajesh Sharma as Dubey
- Remo D'Souza (guest appearance)
- Sunil Pal
- Sahil Khan as Jack

== Production ==
The film was announced with the released the official poster on 16 October 2020, while principal photography started on 25 October in Lucknow, Uttar Pradesh.

== Release ==
The film was released theatrically on 27 May 2022.

== Music ==
The music rights of the film are owned by T Series. The music of the film is composed by Drums Shivamani.

All lyrics are written by Pranav Vatsa.

Track listing
No.	Title	Singer(s)	Length
1.	"Aghora"	Nakul Abhyankar	7:11
2.	"Dehati Disco Title Track"	Divya Kumar	4:16
3.	"Matth Maila"	Nakul Abhyankar	7:35
4.	"Gat Gat Gataa"	Bhanu Pandit	4:59
5.	"Uparwale"	Nakul Abhyankar	5:35
Total length:			29:35

== Reception ==
Deepa Gahlot writing for Rediff.com rated the movie 1.5 stars out of 5 and stated "It's no spoiler who wins." A reviewer from ABP News also rated the film 1.5 stars. Another reviewer from Amar Ujala rated the film 2 stars.

Dhaval Roy writing for The Times of India stated "Ganesh Acharya (as Bhola) tries hard but does not make a cut as an actor."
