= Laawaris (1999 film) =

- Directed by: Shrikant Sharma
- Written by: Honey Irani; Kamlesh Pandey (dialogues)
- Produced by: Lawrence D'Souza; Manohar Pandya
- Starring: Jackie Shroff; Dimple Kapadia; Akshaye Khanna; Manisha Koirala
- Cinematography: Najeeb Khan
- Edited by: R. Rajendran
- Music by: Songs: Rajesh Roshan; Background Score: Raju Singh
- Distributed by: Lama Productions
- Release date: 5 March 1999
- Country: India
- Language: Hindi
- Budget: ₹3.50 crore
- Box office: ₹4.63 crore

Laawaris is a 1999 Indian Hindi-language action drama film directed by Shrikant Sharma. The film stars Jackie Shroff, Dimple Kapadia, Akshaye Khanna, and Manisha Koirala in the lead roles.

== Plot ==
Captain Dada is a local hooligan working for Karla and is in charge of taking "protection money" from people of that locality. A lawyer called Anand moves into that place and refuses to give Captain money when that reaches Karla's ears he gets pissed and asks Captain to settle this case quickly. Captain burns Anand's motorcycle to try to force him to give him money. Anand refuses again and Anand tries to convince Captain to quit that job and Captain challenges Anand to fight with him. Anand does not touch the drunk Captain but Captain gets beaten down by his own carelessness.

Later, Captain goes to steal a motorcycle for Anand as Anand's son made a complaint to him that he has to carry his 15 kilos bag to school now as Captain burned down Anand's motorcycle. Anand refuses to take the bike and police come to arrest the gang. The gang gets bailed before the complaint is even written. Karla gets angry at this and tells Captain to settle this case as quickly as possible. Captain beats Anand with his gang.

Kavita goes to confront Captain. Captain goes to visit Anand at the hospital but Anand sends him away. Meanwhile, Captain meets Anshu who works with Anand, unknown to him. Captain introduces himself as Vijay in front of Anshu and the two start liking each other. Vijay does such after having some small conversations with Kavita who he now addresses as sister. Seeing how Anshu gets lost in the air, Anand asks Anshu to make a meeting with her boyfriend and him. That day, Anand reveals the truth to Anshu. Anshu is heartbroken and calls it an end to their relationship. Also earlier that day, Vijay asked Karla to release him because he wanted a new beginning for Anshu which the latter made it seem he did but he didn't.

Hearing that the two has officially ended, Karla and his right-hand decide to make Raj and Anshu marry each other as Anshu is the police commissioner's niece. Karla also sends another man to collect "protection money" in Vijay's locality. Vijay fights with the new man. The commissioner gets Vijay jailed after hearing Karla angry at the new man. Kavita asks Anand to release Vijay and Anand releases him as he can see Vijay's want to change himself.

Later, Vijay meets Anshu and settle everything between them. They decide to escape when the commissioner catches them but Pushpa, Anshu's aunt who has always supported and protected Anshu from her abusive husband, comes pointing a gun at the commissioner and tells them to run away. The commissioner orders an Inspector to arrest Vijay and Anand. The news reached Karla and his son Raj. When on the road, Vijay escapes with Anshu without Anand and Gaflet, who was granting him a house to live through the night.

Karla's right man finds the two and at the same time the Inspector. Before the Inspector puts Vijay in jail, Raj comes and gets killed in the fuss. The Inspector gives the tree his jeep. Anand goes to take his wife and son away from that colony as their lives are in danger. Anand and some of Vijay's friends fight against Karla's goons and during that Addha loses his life. Karla takes the hospital Anand is in custody. The commissioner and police force come at the hospital and the fight game begins. Karla is hanged to death through his own choices. The movie ends with everyone together and happy.

== Cast ==
- Jackie Shroff as Advocate Anand Saxena
- Dimple Kapadia as Kavita Saxena
- Akshaye Khanna as Captain Dada / Vijay
- Manisha Koirala as Anshu Mehra
- Raza Murad as Inspector Khan
- Johnny Lever as Gaflat Bhai
- Dinesh Hingoo as Rustam
- Pramod Moutho as Police Commissioner Mehra
- Govind Namdev as Kalra
- Parmeet Sethi as Raj Kalra
- Rajesh Joshi as Addha
- Anita Kanwal as Mrs. Mehra

== Soundtrack ==
Laawaris

Soundtrack album by Rajesh Roshan
- Released: 1998
- Genre: Feature film soundtrack
- Label: Venus Records & Tapes

The music was composed by Rajesh Roshan, with lyrics written by Javed Akhtar. The song "Tumne Jo Kaha" was a copy of Barbie Girl by Aqua.

Song	Singer
"Mere Doston"	Udit Narayan
"Aa Kahin Door"	Udit Narayan, Alka Yagnik
"Seene Mein Sulagta Hai Dil"	Roop Kumar Rathod, Alka Yagnik
"Tumne Jo Kaha Maine Woh Suna"	Kavita Krishnamurthy, Abhijeet
"Kuch Hamare Haath Hain"	Shankar Mahadevan, Jolly Mukherjee, Sunita Rao

== Reception ==
Sharmila Taliculam of Rediff.com wrote, ″It has the usual street fights, drama, emotion, and enough tear-jerking scenes to make you suspect if you haven't seen this all before. This film, like many others, working a worked-to-death formula, falls flat on its face.″
