= Gopi Bhalla =

Indian actor

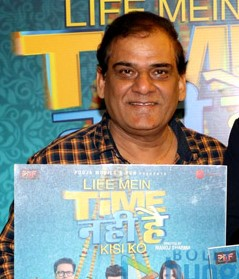
- Gopi Bhalla in trailer launch of Life Mein Time Nahi Hai Kisi Ko
- Born: 13 January 1963 (age 63)
- Occupations: Actor, Comedian
- Years active: 1980–present
- Known for: F.I.R.

Gopi Bhalla is an Indian actor. Some of his notable works in television include F.I.R. and Hum Aapke Hain in Laws. He has also acted in more than 30 Punjabi films.

== Filmography ==
=== Films ===
Year	Film	Role	Language	Notes
1983	Putt Jattan De	Chacha Amli	Punjabi	
1986	Ek Chadar Maili Si		Hindi	
1989	Marhi Da Deeva	Nikka Singh/Nikka	Punjabi	
1992	Mera Dil Tere Liye	Gopi Bhalla	Hindi	
1993	Kudi Canada Di	Preeta	Punjabi	
1994	Vairi	Munshi	Punjabi	
1994	Pehla Pehla Pyar		Hindi	
1996	Smuggler	Barman	Hindi	
1997	Ishq Na Pooche Jaat	Bhambiri	Punjabi	
1998	Dildaara	Balli	Punjabi	
2001	Sikandera	Totee	Punjabi	
2001	Lajja		Hindi	
2002	Jee Aayan Nu		Punjabi	
2004	Mitter Pyare Nu Haal Mureedan Da Kehna		Punjabi	
2006	Aisa Kyon Hota Hai?		Hindi	
2006	Sarhad Paar	Villager	Hindi	
2007	Meri Vahuti Da Viyah	Doctor	Punjabi	Direct-to-video film
2009	Apni Boli Apna Des		Punjabi	
2010	Lad Gaya Pecha		Punjabi	
2010	Action Replayy	Fruit Vendor	Hindi	
2010	Mar Jawan Gur Khake	Gopi	Punjabi	
2011	M.L.A. Natha Singh	Tula Ram	Punjabi	
2014	Romeo Ranjha		Punjabi	
2019	Time Nahi Hai		Hindi	
2022	Dastaar: Symbol of Dignity		Punjabi	
2026	Ginny Wedss Sunny 2		Hindi	

=== Television ===
Year	Series	Role	Notes	Ref(s)
1997–2002	Amanat	Titu Singh		
1998–1999	Family No.1	Various characters		
2006–2015	F.I.R.	Head Constable Gopinath Gandotra		
2012	Gopi Gadha Aur Gupshup	Head Constable Gopinath Gandotra		
2012	Chidiya Ghar	Head Constable Gopinath Gandotra	Guest	
2013	Hum Aapke Hain In Laws	Sher Singh		
2015	Tu Mera Hero	Gulgule Singh		
2016	Dr. Madhumati On Duty	Lovely Singh Dhingra		
2016	Savdhaan India	Chedilal		
2017	Y.A.R.O Ka Tashan	Goga Kapoor		
2017–2018	Deewane Anjane			
