= Dedh Lakh Ka Dulha =

2022 Indian Hindi-language drama film

- Directed by: Abhay Pratap Singh
- Screenplay by: Abhay Pratap Singh
- Story by: Abhay Pratap Singh
- Produced by: KK Films Creations; Jaya Chheda
- Starring: Akhilendra Mishra; Abhay Pratap Singh; Ishtiyak Khan
- Cinematography: DK Sharma
- Edited by: Arun Kumar Sing; Raghubir Sharma
- Music by: Shahjahan Sheikh
- Production company: APS Pictures
- Distributed by: KK Music World
- Release date: 30 December 2022
- Running time: 128 minutes
- Country: India
- Language: Hindi

Dedh Lakh Ka Dulha is an Indian Hindi-language comedy drama film directed by Abhay Pratap Singh. The films stars Akhilendra Mishra, Ishtiyak Khan, Harshita Panwar and Dhruv Chheda.

== Cast ==
- Akhilendra Mishra
- Abhay Pratap Singh
- Ishtiyak Khan
- Harshita Panwar
- Dhruv Chheda
- Ahsan Khan

== Synopsis ==
The story of the film is about how a father, played by Akhilendra Mishra, finds a groom worth 1.5 rupees instead of 1.5 lakh rupees for his daughter. The film then revolves around the truth of whether the groom is actually worth 1.5 Lakh or not.

== Soundtrack ==
The Music and background score were composed by Shahjahan Sheikh, the first collaboration with KK Films Creations.

Dedh Lakh Dulha

Soundtrack album by Shahjahan Sheikh
- Genre: Film soundtrack
- Language: Hindi
- Label: KK Music World
- Producer: KK Films Creations

=== Track list ===
All lyrics are written by Abhay Pratap Singh; all music is composed by Shahjahan Sheikh.

Track Listing
No.	Title	Singer(s)	Length
1.	"Guddu Naach"	Shahid Mallya	3:21
2.	"O Mere Dilbar"	Kumar Sanu	4:03

== Filming ==
The film is mostly shot in Agra, Uttar Pradesh and Naigaon, Mumbai, Maharashtra.
