= Hemant Pandey =

Indian film, theatre and television actor

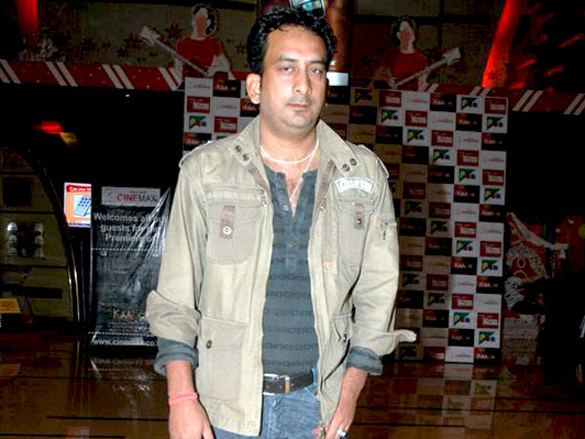
- Occupations: Actor, comedian
- Years active: 1996–present

Hemant Pandey is an Indian film, theatre and television actor, known for his role as Pandeyji in the series Office Office.

== Career ==
Film Career

Pandey appears in the films Krrish and Milenge Milenge.

TV Career

He got his first major role in 1996, with Taank Jhank. He played one of the tenants alongside Dharmesh Vyas and Hemant Kevani, who wants to be an IAS officer. After this he appeared in Office Office and Mrs. Malinee Iyer.

According to Hemant Pandey, he grew up watching the comedies of Johnny Walker and Johnny Lever.

He appeared as the character Ghasita in Imagine TV's Neer Bhare Tere Naina Devi.

Pandev has also performed stand-up comedy for Sony's Kahani Comedy Circus Ki.

== Filmography ==
- Monisha En Monalisa (1999) (Tamil)
- Mujhe Kucch Kehna Hai (2000)
- Rehnaa Hai Terre Dil Mein (2001)
- Aap Mujhe Achche Lagne Lage (2002)
- Ab Ke Baras (2002)
- Badhaai Ho Badhaai (2002)
- Rangli Chunariya Tohre Naam (2004)
- Aan: Men at Work (2004)
- Fareb (2005)
- Krrish (2006)
- Detective Naani (2006)
- Sankat City (2006)
- Kaalo (2010)
- Ready (2011)
- Bin Bulaye Baraati (2011)
- Chala Mussaddi... Office Office (2011)
- Be Careful (2011)
- Machhli Jal Ki Rani Hai (2012)
- 2 Nights in Soul Valley (2012)
- Yaariyan (2014)
- Chor Bazaari (2015)
- Dil Toh Deewana Hai (2016)
- Journey of Bhangover (2017)
- Prakash Electronic (2017)
- When Obama Loved Osama (2018)
- Mausam Ikrar Ke Do Pal Pyar Ke (2018)
- Dagaalty (2020) (Tamil) as Robert
- Chal Guru Ho Jaa Shuru (2015)
- Non Stop Dhamaal (2023)
- Luv You Shankar (2024)
- Life Hill Gayi (2024)
- Pushtaini (2024)
- Haunted 3D: Echoes of the Past (2026)
- Welcome to the Jungle (2026)

Television

- Taak Jhaank (1996)
- Kya Baat Hai (1998)
- Hera Pheri (1999)
- Office Office (2000)
- Tamanna House (2004)
- Neer Bhare Tere Naina Devi (2010)
- Rashi Villa (2016)
- Shankar Jay Kishan (2017)
