= Manoj Pahwa =

Indian film and television actor (born December 1963)

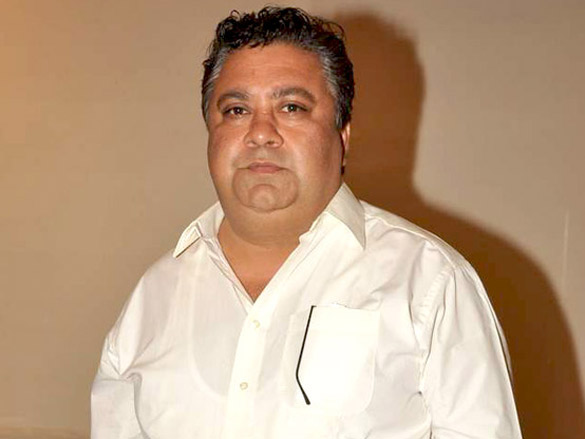
- Pahwa in 2011
- Born: 8 December 1963 (age 62); New Delhi, Delhi, India
- Occupation: Actor
- Years active: 1984–present
- Spouse: Seema Pahwa (m. 1988)
- Children: 2
- Relatives: Pahwa family

Manoj Pahwa (born 8 December 1963) is an Indian film and television actor who is noted for his role as Bhatia in the comedy series Office Office (2001), and debut role in Hum Log (1984-85). Pahwa has acted in over 70 films as a character actor, including 7½ Phere (2005), Being Cyrus (2005), Singh Is Kinng (2008), Dabangg 2 (2012), Jolly LLB (2013), Dil Dhadakne Do (2015), Mulk (2018) and Article 15 (2019).

== Early life and education ==
Pahwa was raised in a Punjabi family in New Delhi. His father migrated from West Punjab (then part of India), Pakistan to India after Partition. He was educated at the National Public School in Daryaganj, New Delhi. In an interview, Pahwa stated that he lived in East Delhi’s Laxmi Nagar locality after his father built a house for them. His father had a business of automobile batteries, and he wanted him to join the family business. Pahwa shifted to Mumbai (then Bombay) in his late 20s.

== Personal life ==
He is married to actress Seema Bhargava, his co-actor in TV series Hum Log, and lives in Versova, Mumbai, along with his daughter Manukriti Pahwa and son Mayank Pahwa.

On 2 March 2022, Mayank married Sanah Kapur whereas in September 2023 Manukriti Pahwa married Ruhaan Kapoor, both siblings being children of actors Pankaj Kapur and Supriya Pathak Kapur. Sanah and Ruhaan are grandchildren of veteran character artiste Dina Pathak and half-siblings of actor Shahid Kapoor.

== Career ==
Pahwa started his career as a stage actor in Hindi theatre in Delhi. His on screen career started with television in the early days of television in India with a small but noticeable part of 'Tony', in the superhit serial Hum Log (1984-85), and later acting in many comedy series, getting considerable roles in Just Mohabbat (1996-2000) and Office Office (2001). He made his movie debut with Tere Mere Sapne (1996) and has acted in 50+ films and TV series as a character actor, known for his comic timing and antics, although he never relies on the "fat joke" style of comedy.

He played the lead the opening segment of anthology horror film Darna Zaroori Hai (2006) directed by Sajid Khan.

During the shoot for Mausam (2011) directed by Pankaj Kapoor, in Chandigarh, he met the local producers, which led to his Punjabi film debut, Heer & Hero.

== Filmography ==
=== Films ===
- Is Raat Ki Subah Nahin (1996) as Rajesh
- Tere Mere Sapne (1996)
- Aar Ya Paar (1997)
- Satya (1998) as Tabela Owner
- Kabhi Pass Kabhi Fail (1999)
- Taal (1999) as Santram
- Josh (2000)
- Hey Ram (2000) as Jalal
- Urf Professor (2001) as Professor
- Tum Bin (2001) as Assistant Commissioner of Police D'Mello
- Aapko Pehle Bhi Kahin Dekha Hai as Aziz Khan
- Kucch To Hai (2003)
- King of Bollywood (2004) as Ratnesh 'Ratty'
- Naach (2004)
- Musafir (2004 film)
- 7½ Phere (2005) as Inspector Rohit Kande
- Being Cyrus (2005) as Inspector Maninder Lovely
- Tathastu (2006) as Hospital Compounder
- Ladies Tailor (2006) as FTV
- Iqraar by Chance (2006) as Talwar - club owner
- Darna Zaroori Hai (2006) as Satish
- Salaam-e-Ishq: A Tribute to Love (2007) as Surjit Chaddha
- Say Salaam India (2007) as Surinder Huda
- MP3: Mera Pehla Pehla Pyaar (2007) as Tony Singh
- Dhamaal (2007) as Pilot
- One Two Three (2008) as Batla Bhai
- Singh Is Kinng (2008) as Dilbagh Singh
- Tashan (2008) as Anand Mohan Tiwari aka Pintu
- Aloo Chaat (2009) as Hakeem Tarachand
- Aamras (2009) as Sharma
- Wanted (2009) as Sonu Gates
- Sankat City (2009) as Gogi Kukreja
- Do Knot Disturb (2009) as Bantu
- London Dreams (2009) as Bhatinda Resident
- Bolo Raam (2009) as Principal Shyam Rawat
- Housefull (2010) as Banta Singh
- Chala Mussaddi... Office Office (2011) as Bhatia
- Mausam (2011) as Gulzari
- Engeyum Kadhal (2011, Tamil)
- Ready (2011) as Laxman Kapoor (Prem's uncle)
- Khap (2011) as Sukhiram
- Hair Is Falling (2011) as Hair Clinic Doctor
- Chaalis Chauraasi (2012)
- Challo Driver (2012)
- 3 Bachelors (2012) as Deepak Verma
- Dabangg 2 (2012) as Commissioner
- Jolly LLB (2013) as Pratap
- Bin Phere Free Me Ttere (2013)
- Heer and Hero (2013)
- War Chhod Na Yaar (2013)
- Singh Saab the Great (2013)
- Pahle Aap short movie (2013) with Rajpal Yadav
- Meri Shadi Karao (2013)
- Dedh Ishqiya (2014)
- Disco Singh (2014)
- Main Tera Hero (2014) as Mr. Prasad
- Dil Dhadakne Do (2015) as Vinod Khanna
- Chal Guru Ho Jaa Shuru (2015)
- Love Exchange (2017) as Mr. Kapoor
- Judwaa 2 (2017) as Sharafat Ali
- Prakash Electronic (2017)
- Shaadi Mein Zaroor Aana (2017) as Jogi Sinha
- Khajoor Pe Atke (2018) as Jeetendar
- Veere Di Wedding (2018) as Mr. Malhotra
- Mulk (2018) as Bilaal Ali Mohammed (Shahid's father and Murad's brother)
- Cabaret (2019) as Newspaper Owner
- Total Dhamaal (2019) as Pintu Choksey
- Student of the Year 2 (2019) as Coach Mahipal
- Article 15 (2019) as Inspector Brahmadutt Singh
- Housefull 4 (2019) as Big Bhai
- Street Dancer 3D (2020) as Chhabra
- Suraj Pe Mangal Bhari (2020)
- Das Capital Gulamon ki Rajdhani (2020)
- Ramprasad Ki Tehrvi (2021) as Gajraj as Ramprasad's eldest son
- Mimi (2021) as Mimi's father
- Anek (2022) as Abrar
- Mili (2022) as Niranjan Naudiyal
- Middle Class Love (2022) as Sharmaji
- Bawaal (2023) as Mr. Dixit
- The Great Indian Family (2023) as Balak Ram
- Jigra (2024) as Bhatia
- Assi (2026)
- Hai Jawani Toh Ishq Hona Hai (2026) as Headmaster Shukla

=== Television ===
Year	Serial	Role	Notes
1984–1985	Hum Log	Tony	
1993–1994	Shikast	Jai	
1995	Banjara Guest house	kitchen cook	
1995–2000	Shanti	Guruji	
1996	Aahat	Film Producer Dedhia	
1996–2000	Just Mohabbat	Ishwar Chopra	
1997	Sab Golmaal Hai	Balwant	
1997–1998	Sea Hawks	Don Bhamra	
1998–1999	Gudgudee	Raghu's Mama	
2001	Office Office	Bhatia	
2002	Ekka Begum Badshah	Ekka	
2002	Bol Baby Bol	Host/presenter	
2005	LOC : Life out of control	Gurpreet Malik	
2009	Oh Darling Yeh Hai India	Vishal Chachabra	
2015	Dafa 420	Chand Nawab Mohammad	
2020	A Suitable Boy	The Raja of Marh	
2022	Home Shanti	Umesh Joshi Sujan	
2023	Chamak	Pratap Deol	
2024	IC 814: The Kandahar Hijack	Mukul Mohan	
2025	The Ba***ds of Bollywood	Avtaar Singh	
2025	Single Papa	Jatin Gehlot	
2025	Perfect Family	Somnath Karkaria	

== Nominations ==
Year	Award Show	Category	Work	Result	Ref
2005	Indian Telly Awards	Best Actor in a Comic Role	LOC: Life Out Of Control	Nominated	
2019	Filmfare Awards	Best Supporting Actor	Mulk	Nominated	
2020	Filmfare Awards	Best Supporting Actor	Article 15	Nominated	
