= Chandrachur Singh =

Indian actor (born 1968)

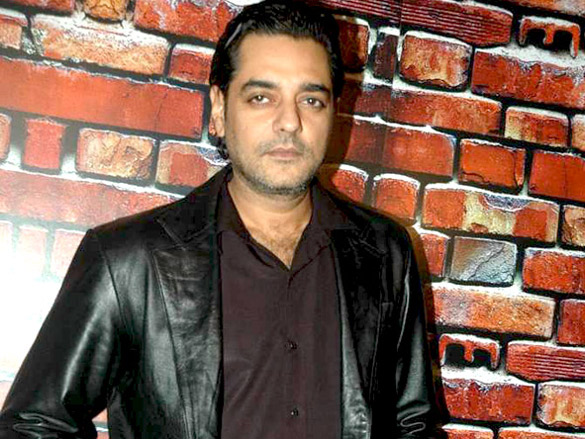
- Chandrachur in 2010
- Born: 11 October 1968 (age 58); Aligarh, Uttar Pradesh, India
- Occupation: Actor
- Years active: 1990–present
- Spouse: Avantika Kumari (m. 1999; separated)
- Children: 1
- Relatives: Rajendra Narayan Singh Deo (maternal grandfather)

Chandrachur Singh (born 11 October 1968) is an Indian actor, who mainly works in Hindi cinema. He is the recipient of a Filmfare Award, and was nominated for an IIFA Award and a Screen Award.

== Early life ==
Singh is the son of Baldev Singh, a former MLA from Khair, a town in Aligarh, Uttar Pradesh, and Krishna Kumari Devi from the royal family of the princely state of Patna in current-day Odisha.

He did his primary schooling from Hillgrange Preparatory School, and grade seven onwards, from the all-boys boarding school The Doon School in Dehradun, and then went to St. Stephen's College, University of Delhi. Later, he prepared the UPSC entrance examination aiming to be an IAS officer. In the early 1990s, Singh, a trained classical singer, taught music at Vasant Valley School and history at his alma mater, The Doon School.

== Career ==
=== Beginnings and early success (mid- to late 1990s) ===
Singh made his acting debut in 1996 in Tere Mere Sapne which was produced under Amitabh Bachchan Corporation Limited. Later that year he starred alongside Tabu in Maachis for which he won the Filmfare Award for Best Male Debut. He appeared in several films as a leading actor which failed to do well, but he had success with his lead roles in the multi-starrers Daag: The Fire (1999) opposite Sanjay Dutt, Kya Kehna (2000) opposite Preity Zinta and Josh (2000) opposite Aishwarya Rai and Shah Rukh Khan, for which he won many popular votes. He was nominated for Filmfare Awards on two occasions, in different categories.

=== Decline (early to mid-2000s) ===
After initial successes, his career declined, because of multiple dislocations of his shoulder joint, which he suffered while water skiing in Goa. Because of the pain, he could not work out or stay fit, which caused him to gain weight and lose roles. His last few releases included Aamdani Atthani Kharcha Rupaiyaa (2001), Bharat Bhagya Vidhata (2002) and the delayed release Sarhad Paar which was shot in 2002 and released in 2006. All three films flopped at the box office.

=== Attempts at comeback (2010s-2020s) ===
In 2012, he made a comeback with the multi-starrer film Chaar Din Ki Chandni. The film featured Tusshar Kapoor, Kulraj Randhawa, Anupam Kher, Om Puri and Farida Jalal in lead roles. Chaar Din Ki Chandni received a mixed response from critics, and turned out to be a flop at most places in India. Singh also played a role in the 2012 English-language film The Reluctant Fundamentalist, directed by Mira Nair. He then appeared in Zilla Ghaziabad which had been delayed for years, and finally released in August 2013.

In 2020, he made his big acting comeback with Disney+ Hotstar crime drama television series Aarya, opposite Sushmita Sen. It was directed by Ram Madhvani.

== Personal life ==
Singh is separated from his wife, and they have a son named Shraanajai.

== Filmography ==
=== Films ===
†	Denotes films that have not yet been released

Year	Title	Role	Notes
1990	Awaargi	—N/a	Assistant director
1995	The Waiter in Slow Motion	Zordar Moothmare	Short film
1996	Tere Mere Sapne	Rahul Mehta	
1996	Maachis	Kripal 'Pali' Singh	Won - Filmfare Award for Best Male Debut
1997	Betaabi	Sameer	
1998	Sham Ghansham	Sham	
1999	Dil Kya Kare	Som Dutt	
1999	Daag: The Fire	Ravi Varma	
1999	Silsila Hai Pyar Ka	Abhay Sinha	
2000	Josh	Rahul Sharma	Nominated - Screen Award for Best Supporting Actor
2000	Kya Kehna	Ajay	Nominated - Filmfare Award for Best Supporting Actor; Nominated - IIFA Award for Best Supporting Actor
2001	Aamdani Atthani Kharcha Rupaiyaa	Ravi	
2002	Bharat Bhagya Vidhata	Shabbir Jehangir Khan	
2006	Sarhad Paar	Ravi	
2009	Maruti Mera Dosst	Raghvendra	
2011	Kemiti Ae Bandhana	Tanmay Patnaik	Oriya film
2012	Chaar Din Ki Chandni	Prithvi Singh	
2012	Prem Mayee	Arun	
2013	Zilla Ghaziabad	Karamvir	
2013	The Reluctant Fundamentalist	Bandy Uncle	English-language film
2013	Let’s Talk	Chutad Singh	Short film
2015	Chal Guru Ho Jaa Shuru	Sathya Baba	
2015	Chooda: Ek Pratha		
2017	Aa Gaya Hero		
2017	Prakash Electronic		
2017	Yadvi - The Dignified Princess	Maharaja Bhupinder Singh	
2022	Cuttputlli	Narinder Singh	
2025	Bayaan		Premiered at the TIFF

=== Television ===
Year	Title	Role	Notes
2012	Royal Rasoi	Host	
2013	Savdhaan India	Akshay	Episode 477
2020	Aarya	Tej Sareen	
2021	Dil Bekaraar	Hardik Motla	
