= Jolly LLB (film series) =

Indian legal comedy drama film series by Subhash Kapoor

Jolly LLB series
- Directed by: Subhash Kapoor
- Written by: Subhash Kapoor
- Story by: Subhash Kapoor
- Produced by: Vijay Singh; Fox Star Studios (1-2); Vijay Singh; Naren Kumar; Dimple Kharbanda (3-)
- Starring: Cast
- Cinematography: Anshuman Mahaley (Jolly LLB); Kamal Jeet Negi (Jolly LLB 2); Rangarajan Ramabadran (Jolly LLB 3)
- Edited by: Sandeep Singh Bajeli (Jolly LLB); Chandrashekhar Prajapati (Jolly LLB 2)
- Music by: Songs: Krsna (Jolly LLB); Manj Musik; Meet Bros; Chirantan Bhatt (Jolly LLB 2); Swaroop Khan; Satkeer (Jolly LLB 3); Background score: Sanjoy Chowdhury (Jolly LLB); Vishal Khurana (Jolly LLB 2)
- Production companies: Star Studio18; Kangra Talkies (3-)
- Distributed by: Star Studio18
- Release dates: 15 March 2013 (1); 10 February 2017 (2); 19 September 2025 (3)
- Country: India
- Language: Hindi

Jolly LLB is a series of Indian Hindi-language legal comedy drama films, written and directed by Subhash Kapoor and produced by Star Studio18.

== Overview ==
=== Jolly LLB (2013) ===
The film begins with a drunk Rahul Dewan (Rajeev Siddhartha), racing in a Toyota Land Cruiser Prado against a Mercedes on 20 April 2009, after he is seduced by a woman in the passenger seat. He loses control and crashes into a wall on the footpath by the road. The film cuts to a court scene where Jagdish Tyagi a.k.a. Jolly (Arshad Warsi), an LLB (law-degree) graduate defending a surgeon against a Public interest litigation (PIL) filed against him after the surgeon had his son operate upon a patient in his pursuit of Guinness Book of World Records. Jolly loses the case but decides to move to the capital Delhi to try his luck. He happens to see prominent criminal lawyer Tejinder Rajpal (Boman Irani) defending Rahul Dewan in a sessions court. Rahul Dewan is accused of causing death under the influence of alcohol. Rajpal convinces the judge that prosecution had no evidence to implicate Rahul Dewan and he was being deliberately targeted by the media as he was from a rich family, resulting in Dewan's acquittal.

After initially reprimanding Jolly for his mistakes in filing the PIL and taking the press reports as an evidence, Justice Tripathi (Saurabh Shukla) gives a date for hearing and warns Jolly to collect some evidence before the hearing. He then runs into Albert Pinto (Harsh Chhaya), who claims to have witnessed the accident. He also summons Rahul Dewan to be present in the court for the hearing. Jolly becomes a celebrity overnight and is admired by Kaul who donates a room in his restaurant to Jolly for using it as his office. However, Jolly's plans turn upside down, when Albert Pinto reveals to him that he is no witness, but a crony of Rajpal and it was part of a plan to extract more money from Dewan clan. As part of the deal, Pinto gives Jolly his share of the money paid by Dewans to silence Pinto. Jolly gleefully accepts the money and regrets that had he known this plan earlier, he would have demanded more money. Albert Pinto turns hostile in the court and Jolly accepts the statement given by Pinto. Judge Tripathi postpones the judgement for the next hearing. Sandhya, cousin and fiancée of Jolly, chides him for compromising on justice for his greed. Jolly realises his mistake once Kaul saab slaps him for his treachery. He returns the money to Rajpal and challenges him to win the case.

Jolly learns that a survivor of the accident stays in Gorakhpur and decides to leave for Gorakhpur. SI Rathi tries to sabotage Jolly's investigation, but is rescued by his bodyguard. He identifies one Sadakanth Mishra as the survivor in Gorakhpur and brings him to Delhi. Jolly prosecutes SI Rathi and finds that he has botched up the investigation by declaring Sadakanth Mishra as dead and snatching his hard-earned money to stop him from killing Mishra. Mishra also identifies Rahul Dewan as the one who drove the Land Cruiser. After conclusion of arguments and counter-arguments between Rajpal and Jolly, Judge Tripathi directs Delhi Police to suspend SI Rathi and initiate a criminal inquiry against him and also declares Rahul Dewan as guilty of the crime and sentences him to seven years in jail under Section 304 of the Indian Penal Code. The film ends with Jolly celebrating with his team while Rajpal is crestfallen as he suffers defeat after a long time.

=== Jolly LLB 2 (2017) ===
It is the year 2016, Jagdishwar Mishra a.k.a. Jolly (Akshay Kumar) is a Lucknow based lawyer who works as an assistant (Munshi) to one of the most famous lawyers of Lucknow, Rizvi Sahab. He hails from Kanpur. To arrange money for his own chamber, Jolly lies to a pregnant lady, Hina (Sayani Gupta) and convinces her to give him rupees 200,000 as fees so that Rizvi Sahab would fight her case. Jolly uses that money to pay the final payment for his own chamber and opens it with a ceremony. When Hina finds out that she has been bluffed by Jolly, she commits suicide. Everyone blames Jolly for her death, including Jolly's father, who worked for 30 years as a clerk for Rizvi Sahab. Filled with guilt, Jolly along with his wife Pushpa (Huma Qureshi) & fellow lawyer Birbal (Rajiv Gupta), decides to fight Hina's case & files a PIL. He soon discovers that Hina's husband Iqbal Qasim (Manav Kaul) was killed in a fake encounter by Inspector Suryaveer Singh (Kumud Mishra) on 13 August 2015–the very next day of their marriage to get a promotion. Singh also shot a fellow constable, Bhadouriya, in his thigh, to show the encounter genuine. Bhadouriya later died due to excessive bleeding, Inspector Suryaveer Singh then hires the best lawyer in Lucknow Pramod Mathur (Annu Kapoor), his friend, to fight his case.

On the very first date, Jolly requests the court for an impartial enquiry into the encounter once again. However court gets adjourned. Jolly is able to get FIR copy & papers regarding the case with the help of a bookie Guru Ji (Sanjay Mishra) in Varanasi by paying him Rs. 500,000. Later he is able to track Ram Kumar Bhadouriya, the son of the constable who died in the fake encounter However, during the court hearing, under a heated argument, Jolly slaps advocate Mathur. Court orders a narco test of Ram Kumar.

Advocate Mathur, uses his power and money to tamper with the narco test video of the witness and proves Jolly wrong in the court. Judge orders the temporary suspension of Jolly's license as a lawyer, but later, Chairman of Discipline Committee, Rizvi Sahab gives Jolly, 4 days of time to prove himself correct. Jolly soon notices that a Kashmir police constable visited Lucknow to identify the terrorist during Iqbal and Hina's wedding. Jolly travels to Kashmir and meets the constable, Fahim Butt, who is now suspended and arrested in a fake case. The constable reveals that the person who died in the encounter was not the real terrorist and is ready to give the statement in the court. Jolly manages to bring the constable to Lucknow court in the next hearing to prove that Iqbal Qasim was not the real terrorist. Meanwhile, Jolly also convinces the police commissioner to tell the truth or else, he will file PIL against all the encounters done by him. The court hearing proceeds till midnight, but Judge still decides to carry on. After constable's statement Jolly surprises everyone by bringing a Hindu Brahmin Pandit in the court (with the help of police commissioner), & claims that he is the real terrorist and has been arrested by the police in Mathura. Jolly cross questions the pandit in the court by asking him deep details of Hindu Vedas. The pandit finally breaks up and admits that he is the terrorist, Mohammad Iqbal Quadri, for whom police were searching and he had bribed Inspector Singh to set him free, hence police had encountered Iqbal Qasim to close the case. Judge then declares Iqbal Qasim innocent and orders the arrest of the terrorist, bails Ram Kumar, son of the constable and gives life imprisonment to Suryaveer Singh along with his accomplices for charge of murder, erasing evidence, misguiding court and showing fake evidences and thus Jolly wins the case. Film ends with Jolly walking out of the court along with his family & everybody praising him.

=== Jolly LLB 3 (2025) ===
After the successful second installment and after third installment, the makers have confirmed to make a third part of this franchise. In November 2017, it is said that the three actors name third part will star both Akshay Kumar and Arshad Warsi. The film will show the war between both the Jolly's and Sabkuchwala all three advocates. Saurabh Shukla, Sanjay Mishra and Brijendra Kala will reprise their respective roles in the film.

== Cast and characters ==
Character	Film		
Character	Jolly LLB (2013)	Jolly LLB 2 (2017)	Jolly LLB 3 (2025)
Jagdish Tyagi Jolly	Arshad Warsi	Mentioned	Arshad Warsi
Jagdishwar Mishra Jolly		Akshay Kumar	Akshay Kumar
Justice Sunderlal Tripathi	Saurabh Shukla	Saurabh Shukla	Saurabh Shukla
Guru Ji	Sanjay Mishra	Sanjay Mishra	
Jolly's assistant/Shiv Kumar Dubey/Lawyer Jawed	Brijendra Kala	Brijendra Kala	Brijendra Kala
Sandhya "Sandhu" Tyagi	Amrita Rao		Amrita Rao
Advocate Tejinder Rajpal	Boman Irani		
Albert Pinto	Harsh Chhaya		
Pratap	Manoj Pahwa		
Kaul Saab	Ramesh Deo		
Senior Dewan	Mohan Agashe		
Justice Poonam	Vibha Chibber		Vibha Chibber
Sadakant Mishra/Ram Kumar Bhadauria/Sahukar Bhardwaj	Sushil Pandey	Sushil Pandey	Sushil Pandey
Inspector Rathi	Sandeep Bose		
Rahul Dewan	Rajeev Siddhartha		
Hawaldar Haldiram	Mukund Bhatt		
Ramakant Shukla	Vijay Gupta		
Lawyer	Vishal O Sharma		
Pushpa Pandey Mishra		Huma Qureshi	Huma Qureshi
Advocate Pramod Mathur		Annu Kapoor	
Mathur's assistant		Kaustubh Pile	
Iqbal Qasim		Manav Kaul	
Mohammed Iqbal Quadri		Inaamulhaq	
Inspector Suryaveer Singh		Kumud Mishra	
Hina Siddiqui		Sayani Gupta	
Zahoor Siddiqui		Vinod Nagpal	
V.K. Paul/Dr. Milind Desai		Avijit Dutt	Avijit Dutt
Birbal		Rajiv Gupta	
Rizvi Sahab		Ram Gopal Bajaj	
CBI Officer		Sudhanva Deshpande	
Fahim Butt		Sunil Kumar Palwal	
Haribhai Khaitan			Gajraj Rao
Janki Rajaram Solanki			Seema Biswas
Advocate Vikram Ray Chaudhary			Ram Kapoor
District Magistrate Avik Sen gupta			Kharaj Mukherjee
Chanchal Chautala			Shilpa Shukla
Rajendra Chowdhary			Shubhrajyoti Barat
MLA Iqbal Singh Shekawat			Raman Atre

== Crew ==
Occupation	Film		
Occupation	Jolly LLB (2013)	Jolly LLB 2 (2017)	Jolly LLB 3 (2025)
Director	Subhash Kapoor	Subhash Kapoor	Subhash Kapoor
Producer(s)	Fox Star Studios	Fox Star Studios	Alok Jain; Ajit Andhare
Writer	Subhash Kapoor	Subhash Kapoor	Subhash Kapoor
Composer(s)	Songs: Krsna; Background score: Sanjoy Chowdhury	Songs: Manj Musik; Meet Bros; Chirrantan Bhatt; Background Score: Vishal Khurana; Additional Score: Amar Mohile	Songs: Aman Pant; Anurag Saikia; Vikram Montrose; Score: Mangesh Dhakde
Cinematographer	Anshuman Mahaley	Kamaljeet Negi	Rangarajan Ramabadran
Editor	Sandeep Singh Bajeli	Chandrashekhar Prajapati	Chandrashekhar Prajapati

== Release and revenue ==
Film	Release date	Budget	Box office revenue	OTT
Jolly LLB	15 March 2013	₹10 crore (US$1.71 million)	₹48.7 crore (US$8.31 million)	JioHotstar
Jolly LLB 2	10 February 2017	₹80 crore (US$12.28 million)	₹197.33 crore (US$30.3 million)	JioHotstar
Jolly LLB 3	19 September 2025	₹120 crore (US$13 million)	₹166.06 crore (US$17 million)	Netflix
Total		₹210 crore (US$22 million)	₹412.09 crore (US$43 million)	

== Awards ==
=== Jolly LLB ===
Award	Category	Recipient(s) and nominee(s)	Result	Ref.
61st National Film Awards	Best Feature Film in Hindi	Subhash Kapoor	Won	
61st National Film Awards	Best Supporting Actor	Saurabh Shukla	Won	
20th Screen Awards	Best Supporting Actor	Saurabh Shukla	Won	
59th Filmfare Awards	Best Story	Subhash Kapoor	Won	
59th Filmfare Awards	Best Dialogue	Subhash Kapoor	Won	

=== Jolly LLB 2 ===
Date of ceremony	Award	Category	Recipient(s) and nominee(s)	Result	Ref.
2 December 2017	Star Screen Awards	Best Film	The State vs Jolly LL.B 2	Nominated	
2 December 2017	Star Screen Awards	Best Actor – Male (Popular)	Akshay Kumar	Nominated	
30 December 2017	Zee Cine Awards	Best Film (Viewer's Choice)	The State vs Jolly LL.B 2	Nominated	
30 December 2017	Zee Cine Awards	Best Actor – Male (Viewer's Choice)	Akshay Kumar	Won	
30 December 2017	Zee Cine Awards	Best Director	Subhash Kapoor	Nominated	
30 December 2017	Zee Cine Awards	Best Writing	Subhash Kapoor	Nominated	
30 December 2017	Zee Cine Awards	Best Actor in a Negative Role	Annu Kapoor	Nominated	
20 January 2018	Filmfare Awards	Best Screenplay	Subhash Kapoor	Nominated	
20 January 2018	Filmfare Awards	Best Dialogue	Subhash Kapoor	Nominated	

== Remake ==
- 2013 film Jolly LLB has been remade into Tamil film Manithan in 2016. In 2017 remade in Telugu as Sapthagiri LLB (2017).

== See also ==
- Manithan
