= Sushil Pandey =

Indian actor

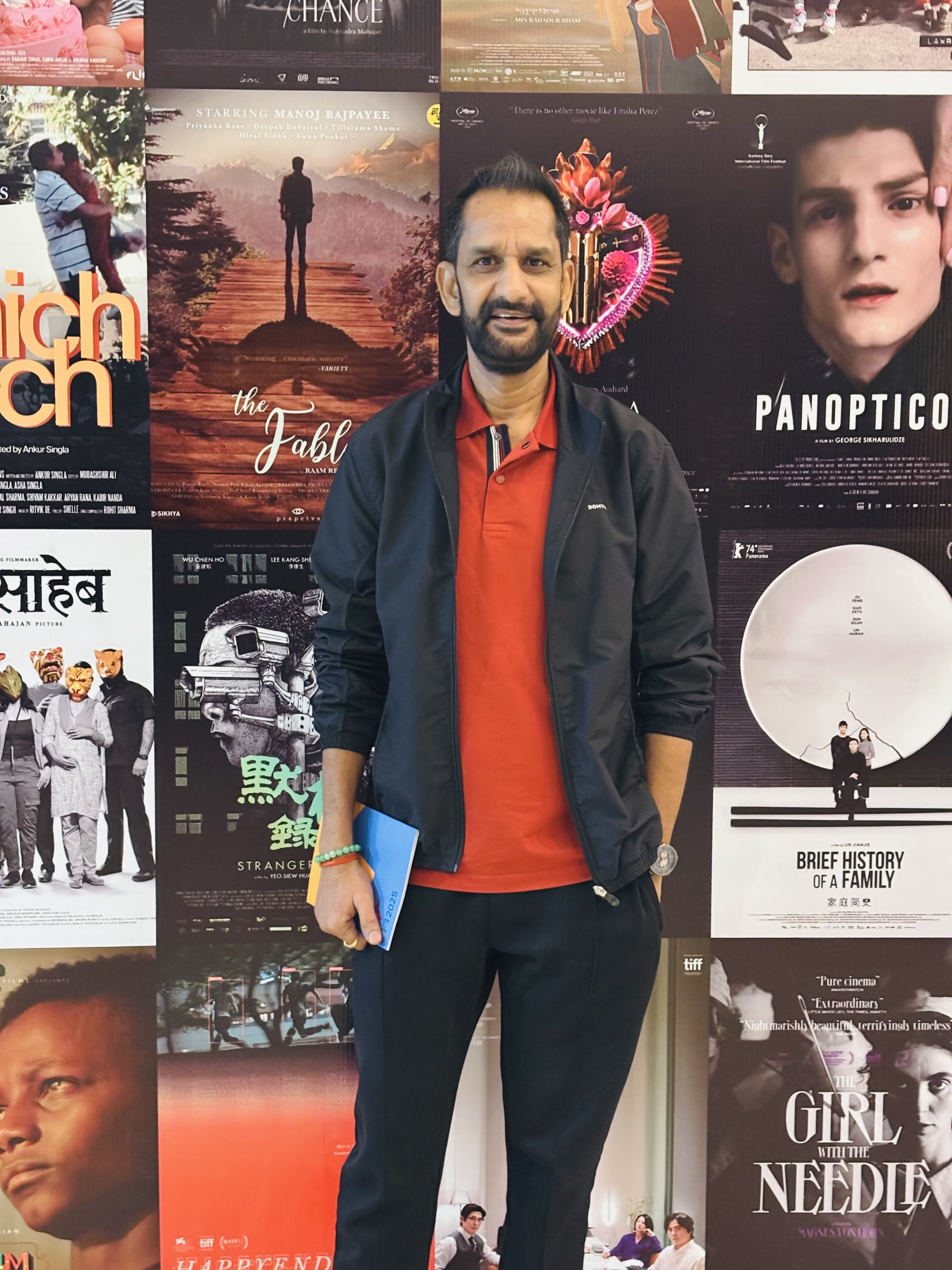
- Born: Bihar, India
- Occupation: Actor
- Years active: 2007–present

Sushil Pandey is an Indian actor who works in Hindi films and television. He is known for his roles in the Jolly LLB (film series), Inside Edge, Article 15, Anek and Bheed.

== Biography ==
Pandey belongs to Bihar, India. He completed his education in Gaya. He lost his father when he was very young.

Pandey made his debut with Shahid Kapoor starrer Jab We Met. His next release was Once Upon a Time in Mumbaai in 2010. He played some minor roles in projects like Pappu Can’t Dance Saala, Phas Gaye Re Obama, Bhoot and Friends, John Day, Umrika and Humorously Yours.

He gained popularity with playing major roles in big projects like Jolly LLB, Jolly LLB 2, Article 15, Maharani, Inside Edge, Mukhbir, Bheed, Human, The Verdict - State Vs Nanavati and Anek.

== Filmography ==
=== Film ===
Year	Title	Role	Notes
2007	Jab We Met	Gang of four: Man 1	
2010	Once Upon a Time in Mumbaai	Iqbal	
2010	Pappu Can't Dance Saala	Real estate agent	
2010	Phas Gye Re Obama	Bhai Sahab's men	
2010	Bhoot and Friends	Banke	
2013	Jolly LLB	Sadakant Mishra	
2013	John Day	Ranade	
2015	Umrika	Photographer	
2015	Mr. X	Tiwari	
2017	Jolly LLB 2	Ramkumar Bhadauria	
2019	Article 15	Nihal Singh	
2019	Super 30	Peon	
2019	Aadhaar	Masterji	
2022	Anek	Sampat	
2023	Bheed	Kanhaiya	
2025	Phule	Raja Ram Phule	
2025	Jolly LLB 3	Raghunath Bhardwaj	

=== Television ===
Year(s)	Ttitle	Role	Notes
2024	Thukra Ke Mera Pyaar	Gendalal	17 episodes
2022	Mukhbir - The Story of a Spy	Qasim / Purushottam	3 episodes
2022	Human	Rajneesh Gulta	10 episodes
2021	Crime Factory	Jahangir Khan	Teleivision film
2021-2024	Maharani	Kunwar Singh	8 episodes
2019	The Verdict – State vs Nanavati	Karunesh Pandey	8 episodes
2017-2021	Inside Edge	Rajeshwar Mehta	5 episodes
2011-2016	Crime Patrol	Prahlad Gupta / Bashir Ahmed	21 episodes
