= Vaah =

Vaah can refer to:

- Vaah! Life Ho Toh Aisi!, a film
- Ahmedabad Airport, with airport code VAAH
