= Phas Gaye Re Obama =

- Theatrical release poster
- Directed by: Subhash Kapoor
- Written by: Subhash Kapoor
- Produced by: Ashok Pandey
- Starring: Rajat Kapoor; Neha Dhupia; Manu Rishi; Sanjay Mishra; Amol Gupte
- Cinematography: Arvind Kannabiran
- Edited by: Sandeep Singh Bajeli
- Music by: Manish J. Tipu
- Production company: Revel Films
- Distributed by: Warner Bros. Pictures
- Release date: 3 December 2010
- Running time: 108 minutes
- Country: India
- Language: Hindi
- Budget: ₹6 crore
- Box office: ₹14 crore

Phas Gaye Re Obama (transl. Obama, we are trapped!) is a 2010 Indian Hindi-language satirical black comedy film written and directed by Subhash Kapoor. The film stars Rajat Kapoor, Neha Dhupia, Sanjay Mishra, Manu Rishi and Amole Gupte in the lead roles. The music and background score was composed by Manish. J. Tipu and the lyrics were penned by Shellee and Gopal Tiwari. The film was released on 3 December 2010. It was produced by Revel Films and distributed by Warner Bros. Pictures. Phas Gaye Re Obama is a comedy set against the backdrop of a global recession/meltdown that originated in the US.

It was released to positive reviews. The film was remade in Telugu as Sankarabharanam (2015).

== Plot ==
The story begins with Anni and his gangster colleagues who all work for Bhai Sahab, a gangster, watching U.S. president Barack Obama's famous speech 'Yes We Can' on TV. Anni is shown as a big fan of Obama and wants to migrate to the US. In the US, Om Shastri, a businessman has faced huge losses due to recession and is all set to lose his house if he can't pay his $100,000 loan in the next thirty days. He comes to India to sell his ancestral property in Bulandshahr, Uttar Pradesh as his last hope. But the recession has also hit India and he struggles to find a buyer.

Anni meets Om who promises him to take him to US, Anni in excitement tells Bhai Sahab who thinks Om is rich and orders his kidnapping. He hopes to get a good ransom so that his bad time (due to recession) ends. Om is kidnapped but later tells Bhai Sahab and his men that he is bankrupt. Thanks to the local police, one of the local gangsters Ali learns about Om and orders Bhai Sahab to hand over to him. Anni comes with the idea of selling Om to Ali. Anni, Bhai Sahab and his men chant 'Yes We Can' out of happiness. Om on hearing their conversation suggests Bhai Sahab and him share the money, in return he would not tell Ali about their cheating. The deal happens and Bhai Sahab gets ₹ 3 million. Bhai Sahab then transfers half the amount to Om's bank account in the US.

The other gangster learns of Om's bankruptcy. But Om saves his and Anni's life by telling the same idea. The price is now Rs. 6 million and divided equally. Om is then sold for ₹ 6 million to Munni, a dreaded female gangster who hates men. Om is happy because he receives ₹ 3 million and now there is a total of ₹ 4.5 million (US$100,000) in his bank account and tells his wife to pay off the loan. But soon Munni discovers Om's situation and that he played a trick on her so she called him and Anni and threatened them by capturing Anni and while her sidekicks rape him she captures Bhai Sahab and his men and warn them to either return her money or get gang raped and then murdered. Om again saves his and others' lives from Munni asking her to play the same trick with local Minister and politician Dhanajay Singh.

So Munni takes Om to Dhanajay Singh. The Minister runs a kidnapping mafia and is the head of all kidnappings. Minister pays Munni ₹ 15 million and keeps Om and Anni at his guest house. Om and Anni come to know that they will be killed if Om's wife doesn't pay the ransom. At night, Om fakes a heart attack and escapes with Anni. The Minister orders the police for a manhunt. Realizing that he cannot escape to Delhi, he devises a new plan.

He goes to the local police station where the Minister is there and surrenders to him. The minister is about to take Om back to the guest house when Anni along with the Minister's supporters and local media arrive. The minister has no option but to release Om. Om, on the other hand, tells the media to project the Minister as the next Chief Minister of Uttar Pradesh for saving his life.

While on his way to Delhi to catch a flight back to the US, Om is stopped by Bhai Sahab and Munni. Munni gives Om his share but Om tells her to give it to his Indian relatives. Om leaves and Anni stays back in India. In the last scene, Munni asks Bhai Sahab if they can be partners and he replies, "Yes, we can".

== Cast ==
- Rajat Kapoor as Om Shastri
- Neha Dhupia as Munni Madame
- Sanjay Mishra as Bhai Sahab
- Manu Rishi as Anandprakash Rastogi a.k.a. Anni
- Pragati Padeny as Ritu Shastri, Om's wife
- Brijendra Kala as Inspector Tiwari
- Sushil Pandey as Bhai Sahab's men
- Amol Gupte as Minister Dhananjay Singh
- Sumeet Nijhawan as Ali Bhai
- Amit Sial as Mukhtar Ali
- Ishtiyak Khan as English teacher
- Devender Chaudhary as Bichoo
- Pramod Pathak as Superintendent of Police

== Soundtrack ==
1. "American Meltdown" (Instrumental)
2. "Amrikwa Ne Loot Liya" (Manish J. Tipu)
3. "Returning Home" (Instrumental)
4. "Run For Ransom" (Instrumental)
5. "Sara Pyaar Hai Bekaar" (Manish J. Tipu, Richa Sharma, Kailash Kher, Neha Dhupia)
6. "Sara Pyaar Hai Bekaar (Remix)" (Kailash Kher)
7. "Welcome to the Gang" (Instrumental)
8. "Yes We Can" (Instrumental)

== Production ==
Subhash Kapoor had developed an idea of making a movie on recession after his first film Salaam India had a relatively low-key release. He didn't get many opportunities thereafter, leaving him "frustrated". Stating the reason for choosing the recession as the theme, he said,

"The producers would say 'We are facing recession'. The frustration was more from the fact that recession was something in which we had no role to play. Like many of our problems, it was also a creation of the U.S. So, in a way, to give vent to my anger I wrote a satire. I thought when the whole world was affected by recession how could the underworld and politicians stay away from it. So I created a set of gangsters who have no money in their pockets. They pin their hopes on an NRI, who also turns out to be hit by recession."

Before turning director, Subhash Kapoor, as a journalist toured North India extensively, and it is reflected in the dialect that the characters speak. This was the reason he opted for kidnapping as the "industry" that got affected by recession. "Kidnapping has become an industry in the region and often the characters involved in action have a humorous take on life", noted Kapoor. He drew inspiration from real life politicians for the character portrayed by Amol Gupte. "The character of the politician played by Amol Gupte is drawn from D.P. Yadav and Shibu Soren and some of his actions remind one of Raja Bhaiyya", said Kapoor.

He created a female don character in Phas Gaye Re Obama to show her as a "larger-than-life character" and to show her as competing with "her male counterparts in the kidnapping industry" and cast Neha Dhupia for the role. Dhupia had to learn the dialect after watching Mayawati speak. "As I play a gangster from UP in the film, I had to get that language right and so I observed Mayawati to learn how she speaks. She is the only woman whose dialect, whether she is serious or funny, is extremely monotonous. So I have tried to incorporate this in my character. However, my character is not inspired by her", she said. She made her singing debut, recording a song with Kailash Kher for the film.

== Reception ==
Phas Gaye Re Obama mostly garnered positive reviews. Rajeev Masand of CNN-IBN praised the film as a "deliciously smart comedy" and gave it a rating of 3.5 out of a scale of 5. He appreciated Manu Rishi for bringing "perfect degree of naïvete to his role of a gangster's moderately-educated sidekick yearning for a better life." Nikhat Kazmi of Times of India praised the film for its "ticklish humor and trick-and-treat plot line". "Phas Gaye Re Obama is a delightful end-of-the-year surprise package", she said. Mayank Shekhar of Hindustan Times rated it at 3 out of a scale of 5 and described the film as a "black comedy" and credited the director for his "superbly written" script. Sukanya Verma of Rediff too gave a positive review about the film and said that there is "absolutely no dearth of LOL inducing moments". She extolled Sanjay Mishra, saying that "though he doesn't have as many scenes as Rajat Kapoor or Manu Rishi, that doesn't keep him from owning the scenes he features in". She declared it as "insane and awesome".

Anupama Chopra of NDTV appreciated the director but felt that he couldn't "sustain his energy in the second half. Despite the hiccups Phas Gaye Re Obama has genuine laughs and surprising insight". Anuj Kumar of The Hindu lauded the director Subhash Kapoor for coming up with a "well-textured satire on recession that almost turns out to be a winner". He also felt that "it would have been better if Kapoor had not cast Neha Dhupia as the male-hating ganglord as she looks the odd one out in the midst of a proficient set of actors like Sanjay Mishra, Manu Rishi and Amol Gupte, who have got the pulse of the screenplay". The film was well appreciated by the critics for its quirky interpretation of Barack Obama's Yes We Can slogan to suit the setting.

== Awards ==
- Won – Star Screen Award for Best Comedian – Sanjay Mishra
- Nominated – Apsara Award for Best Performance in a Comic Role – Sanjay Mishra
