= Revel Films =

- Industry: Film production
- Founded: 2009; 16 years ago

Revel Films Pvt. Ltd., established in 2009 by Ashok Pandey and Pragati Pandey, is a film production company that focuses on entertainment. The company's early projects included the short film "An Expression" (2010) and the feature film "Phas Gaye Re Obama" (2010).

In subsequent years, Revel Films produced two additional movies: "Saare Jahaan Se Mehnga" (2013) and "Nakli" (2013).

== Founders ==
Ashok Pandey, who has a BE in Electrical and Electronics Engineering from BITS Pilani, and an MS in Computer Science from City College of New York.

Pragati Pandey is a BCom graduate from Kanpur University with continuing education at Pace University, New York. Pragati Pandey is a trained actress, who has been part of and managed several events, shows, films, and plays. She is in the creative wing of the organization.

== Films ==
Phas Gaye Re Obama was Revel Films' first film for Indian cinema, directed by Subhash Kapoor featuring Neha Dhupia, Rajat Kapoor, Sanjay Mishra, Manu Rishi Chadda, and Amole Gupte. The film is a satire on the US inflation and the ambitions of small-town thugs and a bandit queen.

Year	Film	Director	Notes	Awards
2012	Saare Jahaan Se Mehnga	Anshul Sharma		
2010	Phas Gaye Re Obama	Subhash Kapoor		Won –: SAIFF- (Won the Audience Choice Award); Cine Blitz Awards (Subhash Kapoor won for Best Story); Nominated –: Star Screen Awards; Apsara Awards; Zee Cine Awards; Global Indian TV Awards; Cine Awards
2009	An Expression	Subhash Kapoor	Won awards at International Film Festivals	Special mention- Barcelona Short Film Festival; Best actress (Pragati Pandey)- Film festival at New York; Best Actor (Pramod Pathak)- Film festival at Chicago
