= Manithan (2016 film) =

2016 Indian film by I. Ahmed

- Theatrical release poster
- Directed by: I. Ahmed
- Screenplay by: I. Ahmed
- Dialogues by: Ajayan Bala
- Based on: Jolly LLB by Subhash Kapoor
- Produced by: Udhayanidhi Stalin
- Starring: Udhayanidhi Stalin; Radha Ravi; Prakash Raj; Vivek; Hansika Motwani; Aishwarya Rajesh
- Cinematography: R. Madhi
- Edited by: J. V. Manikanda Balaji
- Music by: Santhosh Narayanan
- Production company: Red Giant Movies
- Distributed by: Fox Star Studios
- Release date: 29 April 2016
- Running time: 148 minutes
- Country: India
- Language: Tamil

Manithan (transl. Human) is a 2016 Indian Tamil-language legal drama film written and directed by I. Ahmed. The film features an ensemble cast, including Udhayanidhi Stalin, Radha Ravi, Prakash Raj, Vivek, Hansika Motwani and Aishwarya Rajesh. A remake of the Hindi film Jolly LLB (2013), it revolves around a junior lawyer who, after a period of struggle and ridicule among colleagues, fights a case against a powerful supreme court lawyer, hoping to further his career. The film began production in August 2015 and ended by March 2016. It was released on 29 April 2016.

== Plot ==
The film begins with Rahul Dewan drunkenly racing in a Toyota Land Cruiser Prado against an Audi, after he is seduced by a woman in the passenger seat. He loses control and crashes into a wall.

In court, Sakthivel, an LLB graduate defends a surgeon against public interest litigation (PIL) filed against him after the surgeon had his son operate on a pregnant woman in his pursuit of Guinness Book of World Records. Sakthi loses the case but decides to move to Chennai to try his luck. He happens to see prominent criminal lawyer Adhiseshan defending Rahul in a sessions court. Rahul is accused of causing death under the influence of alcohol. Adhiseshan convinces the judge that prosecution had no evidence to implicate Rahul and that he was being deliberately targeted by the media as he was from a rich family, resulting in Rahul's acquittal.

Adhiseshan, though, is not satisfied with the fee paid by the Dewans. Sakthi, desperate for money and fame, decides to pursue the case and files a PIL in the court against Rahul's acquittal. After initially reprimanding Sakthi for his mistakes in filing the PIL and taking the press reports as evidence, Justice Dhanapal gives a date for hearing and warns Sakthi to collect some evidence before the hearing. He then runs into Vijay Nair, who claims to have witnessed the accident. Sakthi introduces him as a witness in the court and Dhanapal, after cross-examining him, gives a date for the next hearing. He also summons Rahul to be present for the hearing.

Sakthi becomes a celebrity overnight and is admired by Moorthy, who donates a room in his restaurant to Sakthi for use as his office. However, Sakthi's plans turn upside down when Vijay reveals to him that he is no witness, but a crony of Adhiseshan, and it was part of a plan to extract more money from the Dewan clan. As part of the deal, Nair gives Sakthi his share of the money paid by the Dewans to silence Nair. Sakthi accepts the money and regrets that, had he known this plan earlier, he could have demanded more money. Nair turns hostile in the court, and Sakthi accepts the statement given by Nair. Dhanapal postpones the judgement for the next hearing. Priya Dharmalingam, the cousin and fiancée of Sakthi, chides him for compromising on justice for his greed. Sakthi realises his mistake. Moorthy slaps him for his treachery. He returns the money to Adhiseshan and challenges him to win the case.

With the help of his uncle Surya, Sakthi collects the video footage of the Land Cruiser involved in the accident and presents it to the court. Though Adhiseshan counters that the Land Cruiser was driven by the driver of the Dewan family, Sakthi refutes his statement by submitting the necessary evidence. Dhanapal orders the Police to provide a bodyguard for Sakthi after he is seriously beaten by alleged assistants of Adhiseshan. Sakthi and his friends try to interview a relative of one of the victims, Muthupandi, but he says that he knows nothing. Sakthi and Priya decide to leave, but a lorry hits them, injuring Priya. At the hospital, Muthupandi tells Sakthi that a survivor of the accident stays in Vandavasi and Sakthi and one of his friends leave for Vandavasi. Inspector Selvam tries to sabotage Sakthi's investigation, but Sakthi is rescued by his bodyguard. Sakthi and journalist Jennifer arrive at Vandavasi, but the police, who captured Muthupandi, kidnap the survivor.

The next day, Sakthi reveals that he brought the survivor, thanks to Muthupandi intentionally showing the police the wrong man, and Sakthi prosecutes Selvam and finds that he has botched the investigation by declaring Kamalakannan (Raja Rishi) as dead and snatching Kamalakannan's money to stop him from killing Kannan. Kamalakannan testifies that he woke up that night to see his family lying in a pool of blood and Rahul getting out of the car, and after seeing what he has done, Rahul spotted Kamalakannan and ran him over with his car, so no there would be no witnesses. Kamalakannan survived with a broken leg. Dhanapal tells Rahul to come to the podium and orders Kannan to see if Rahul was the driver. Kannan confirms that Rahul was the one who drove the Land Cruiser. After arguments and counter-arguments between Adhiseshan and Sakthi, Dhanapal directs the Tamil Nadu Police to suspend Selvam and initiate a criminal inquiry against him, and declares Rahul as guilty of the crime, sentencing him to 14 years in jail. While Sakthi celebrates with his team, Adhiseshan is crestfallen over suffering defeat for the first time.

== Cast ==
- Udhayanidhi Stalin as Sakthivel (Sakthi)
- Radha Ravi as Justice Dhanapal
- Prakash Raj as Adhiseshan
- Vivek as Surya
- Hansika Motwani as Priya Dharmalingam
- Aishwarya Rajesh as Jennifer
- Mohan Agashe as Ram Dewan
- Sangili Murugan as Moorthy
- Krishna Kumar as Vijay Nair
- Mayilsamy as Constable Guruji
- Srinivasan as Dr. Kuzhandaisamy
- Raja Rishi as Kamalakannan
- Aswin Rao as Vasu
- Kalairani as Judge
- Angana Roy as Priya's sister
- Swaminathan as Advocate
- Yaar Kannan as Advocate Pazhani
- Gajaraj as Dharmalingam
- Cheranraj as Inspector Selvam
- Cell Murugan as Advocate
- Lollu Sabha Manohar as Google
- Balu Anand as Constable
- Sakthivel as Muthupandi
- Suraj as Rahul Dewan
- Lollu Sabha Anthony
- Sainath as Adhiseshan's junior
- Raju as Raju

== Production ==
In 2014, director I. Ahmed and producer Udhayanidhi Stalin planned a film titled Idhayam Murali, which would star Udhayanidhi and Hansika Motwani. However, the team were unable to begin production and decided to stall the venture, instead choosing to remake Subhash Kapoor's 2013 Hindi film, Jolly LLB. Unlike the original film, which was a comedy drama, Manithan was made to be more serious and dramatic. Motwani and Udhayanidhi were retained as the lead actors. The makers initially sought to cast Akshara Gowda in another major role, before finalising Aishwarya Rajesh. Mohan Agashe, who appeared in the original, repeated his role. Cinematography was handled by R. Madhi, and editing by J. V. Manikanda Balaji.

Production began in August 2015, with the film not yet titled. The film was revealed to be reaching completion by early December 2015, before the film's set was destroyed in Saligramam following the 2015 South India floods. The title of the film, Manithan, was announced on 14 January 2016, coinciding with the release of the film's first poster. The makers initially thought of titling the film Shakti, after the lead character, until cast member Vivek suggested Manithan. To secure this title, the team obtained permission from AVM Productions, the producers of the 1987 film of the same name. Filming locations included Chalakudy, Chennai, Karaikudi and Pollachi. Filming ended by early March 2016.

== Music ==
Manithan

Soundtrack album by Santhosh Narayanan
- Released: 7 April 2016
- Genre: Feature film soundtrack
- Length: 18:37
- Language: Tamil
- Label: Sony Music India

Santhosh Narayanan chronology
Kadhalum Kadandhu Pogum (2016)	Manithan (2016)	Iraivi (2016)

The soundtrack was composed by Santhosh Narayanan. The audio launch was held at Suryan FM in April 2016. The song "Kaichal", despite featuring in the film, was not officially released.

Track listing
No.	Title	Lyrics	Singer	Length
1.	"Aval"	Vivek	Pradeep Kumar, Priya Himesh	04:26
2.	"Mun Sellada"	Madhan Karky	Anirudh Ravichander, Dinesh Kanagaratnam	03:19
3.	"Poi Vazhva"	Vivek	Vijaynarain, Santhosh Narayanan	03:59
4.	"Kondattam"	Madhan Karky	Radar with AK, Divya Ramani	03:35
5.	"Adho: Theme"		Kalpana Raghavendar	03:18
6.	"Kaichal"		Shakthisree Gopalan	02:47
Total length:				21:25

== Release ==
Manithan was released in theatres on 29 April 2016. Post-release release, the film was denied entertainment tax exemption because it allegedly did not meet the state government's then criteria of exemptions for pure Tamil-titled films. Udhayanidhi then announced his plans to appeal in court.

== Critical reception ==
Malini Mannath of The New Indian Express wrote, "The courtroom drama with its twists and turns, is engaging and well crafted. With its solid screenplay and its light-hearted take, Manithan is worth a watch". Lata Srinivasan of Daily News and Analysis wrote, "Manithan works because of the casting and the fact that one lawyer from nowhere decides to fight for justice for the have-nots. It's a feel-good film that has you rooting for the weak and shows you that being a manithan (human) is important". She also wrote "Very often a remake can go wrong, but in this case, director Ahmed has adapted the Hindi film to local sensibilities very well. Jolly LLB is not your typical commercial masala and adapting it to suit the local audience requires the knack to pull it off. Ahmed has added the right amount of humour and lengthened the presence of the heroine to make it more appealing to the Tamil audience". M Suganth of The Times of India called Manithan, a legal drama, "a welcome relief in this age of ghosts and guns" and rated it 3.5 out of 5. Baradwaj Rangan wrote for The Hindu, "Manithan generally hovers in the hmmm-not-all-that-bad-zone because it's such a crowd-pleasing script". Anupama Subramanian of Deccan Chronicle wrote, "Ahmed definitely deserves a pat for giving a clean film with a message and steer clearing away from clichéd kuthu numbers and double meaning dialogues in the name of comedy".
