= Ashraful Haque (actor) =

Indian actor

Ashraf ul Haque
- Pronunciation: [aʃɹaful ɦɔk]
- Born: 1968 or 1969; Goalpara, Assam
- Died: 17 February 2015 (aged 46); Mumbai, Maharashtra, India
- Occupation: Actor
- Known for: Talaash; Manjhi - The Mountain Man; Delhi Belly

Ashraf ul Haque (Assamese pronunciation: [aʃɹaful ɦɔk]; c. 1968 – 17 February 2015) was an Indian actor who mainly appeared in Hindi films and was popularly known for his work in Talaash (2012), Delhi Belly (2011) and Manjhi - The Mountain Man (2015). He also appeared in Black Friday, Company, Deewar, Fukrey, Jungle, and Raavan . He was a graduate of the National School of Drama.

== Early life and career ==
Haque hails from Goalpara in Assam. He graduated from National School of Drama in 1997 with specialisation in Acting. He started his career with critically acclaimed film, Behrupiya and had acted in over 30 films apart from his television serials and ad films. He had also performed in more than 30 plays. Haque is survived by his wife and a son.

== Illness and death ==
He had a rare disorder called myelodysplastic syndrome and was undergoing treatment for sometime. He died on 17 February 2015 at the age of 46.

== Filmography ==
- Sab Golmaal Hai
- Dil Kya Kare
- Mela
- Shool
- Jungle
- Love Ke Liye Kuch Bhi Karega
- Lal Salaam
- Kranti
- Company
- Calcutta Mail
- Yuva
- Deewaar: Let's Bring Our Heroes Home
- Black Friday
- The White Land
- Risk
- Khanna and Iyer
- The Stoneman Murders
- Raavan
- Aakrosh
- Knock Out
- Mumbai Cutting
- Red Alert: The War Within
- Delhi Belly
- Mumbai Mast Kallander
- Satrangee Parachute
- Chittagong
- Paan Singh Tomar
- Talaash: The Answer Lies Within
- Fukrey
- The Lost Behrupiya
- Manjhi - The Mountain Man
- Game Paisa Ladki
