= Bhouri =

2016 Indian social drama film by Jasbir Bhaati

- Theatrical release poster
- Directed by: Jasbir Bhaati
- Written by: Jagat Bhusan Singh/Manjeet Mahipal
- Produced by: Chandrapal Singh
- Starring: Raghubir Yadav; Mukesh Tiwari
- Release date: 2016
- Country: India
- Language: Hindi

Bhouri is a 2016 Indian social drama film. It is a glimpse of the life conditions of a particular women in rural North India, set against the background of social conflict surrounding women in rural India. Masha Paur, Raghubir Yadav, Kunika, Shakti Kapoor played pivotal roles in the film.

== Plot ==
A tragic love story of Bhouri, a 23-year-old who is married to a 45-year-old, the film highlights the exploitation of women in male dominated society.

== Cast ==
- Masha Paur as Bhouri
- Raghubir Yadav as Dhanua
- Kunickaa Sadanand as Kaki
- Shakti Kapoor as Adarsh / Prince Mangal
- Mukesh Tiwari as Wasim / Prince Mangal
- Mohan Joshi as Chaudhary Kulkarni
- Manoj Joshi as Banya
- Sitaram Panchal as Pandit
- Aditya Pancholi as police inspector
- Vikrant Rai as Shekhar / Filmmaker
- Vicky Ahuja as Budhua
- Pooja Saxena as Malti
- Manjeet Mahipal as Doctors Compounder
- Wasim Khan as Banya Assistant
- Padam Singh as Vakil
- Kiron Roy as Bindia
- Rani Verma as Basanti
- Riya Mishra as Chaudhrain
- Preeti Singh as Chuniya
- Shailendra Tiwari as Chief Medical Officer
