= Saare Jahaan Se Mehnga =

- Directed by: Anshul Sharma
- Written by: Roopesh Thapliyal; Vijay Manral
- Produced by: Ashok Pandey
- Starring: Sanjay Mishra; Pragati Pandey; Zakir Hussain; Vishwa Mohan Badola
- Cinematography: Fasahat Khan
- Edited by: Devendra Murdeshwar
- Music by: Manish J. Tipu
- Production company: Revel Films
- Distributed by: DAR Motion Pictures
- Release date: 8 March 2013
- Running time: 1hr 44minutes
- Country: India
- Language: Hindi
- Budget: ₹5 crore
- Box office: ₹84 lakh

Saare Jahaan Se Mehnga (transl. More expensive here than elsewhere) is a 2013 Bollywood satire film directed by Anshul Sharma starring Sanjay Mishra and Pragati Pandey. The film was written by Roopesh Thapliyal and Vijay Manral, and the lyrics were by Naveen Tyagi. The film also has Ranjan Chhabra, Disha, Vishwa Mohan Badola, Pramod Pathak, Zakir Hussain, and Sitaram Panchal. Saare Jahaan Se Mehnga..., produced by Ashok Pandey under the banner of Revel Films, is a satire on the rising prices in the country.

The movie was a box office disaster.

== Cast ==
- Sanjay Mishra as Puttan Pal
- Pragati Pandey as Noori
- Zakir Hussain as Loan Inspector
- Vishwa Mohan Badola as Nag Pal
- Ranjan Chhabra as Gopal
- Pramod Pathak as Mani Pal
- Disha Pandey as Suman
- Sitaram Panchal as Vedpal
- Rajpal as Rashan Pal

== Soundtrack ==
Saare Jahaan Se Mehnga

Soundtrack album by Manish J Tipu
- Released: 13 February 2013
- Genre: Feature film soundtrack
- Length: 23:07
- Language: Hindi
- Label: T-Series

The soundtrack of Saare Jahaan Se Mehnga consists of 6 songs composed by Manish J. Tipu the lyrics of which were written by Naveen Tyagi.

Tracklist
No.	Title	Singer(s)	Length
1.	"Lag Gai"	Tochi Raina, Shriram Iyer & Manish J Tipu	03:32
2.	"Bolo Na"	Sonu Nigam, Shreya Ghoshal	03:42
3.	"Auon De"	Mika Singh	03:47
4.	"Kismat Ki Bell Baji"	Amit Kumar
5.	"Lag Gai" (Remix)	Tochi Raina, Shriram Iyer, Manish J Tipu & DJ Suketu & Aks	04:53
6.	"Auon De" (Remix)	Mika Singh & DJ Suketu & Aks	03:41
Total length:			23:07

== Critical reception ==
The Times of India gave the film a rating of 2 out of 5 saying that, "Saare Jahaan Se Mehenga has a brilliant concept, earnest performances and clean humour. The film however falls short of evolving beyond the basic idea, which curtails the impact it should ideally make." Vinayak Chakravorty of India Today gave the film a rating of 2 out of 5 saying that, "At the core of debutant director Anshul Sharma's film is a whacky idea. The idea, though, gets lost in interpretation. The film is an honest intention gone astray." Sudhish Kamath of The Hindu reviewed the film saying that Saare Jahaan Se Mehnga is "A sincere film straight from the heart that takes too long to get going." Nandini Ramnath of Live Mint reviewed the film saying that, "The simplistic and limited premise is better suited to an hour-long television series episode than a full-length feature. Saare Jahaan Se Mehnga feels stretched even at a relatively short running length of an hour and 48 minutes."

Taran Adarsh of Bollywood Hungama gave the film a rating of 2.5 out of 5 and said that, "On the whole, SAARE JAHAAN SE MEHNGA… is topical, relevant and relatable, with some endearing moments. It may be lacking in face-value, but you can't deny that it's an honest effort!" Shubhra Gupta of The Indian Express gave the film a rating of 2.5 out of 5 saying that, "The film has been written zippily by people who know this world. It looks and feels authentic, minus exaggeration. And the actors look as if they belong." Rajeev Masand of News18 gave the film a rating of 2.5 out of 5 and said that the film "is a well-intentioned satire constructed around a promising premise. But the film's writers fail to build on their clever central idea, and ultimately deliver an undercooked script that lacks the consistent wit of 2010's Phas Gaye Re Obama."

== Box office ==
Saare Jahaan Se Mehnanga collected 84 lakhs. Made on a budget of 5 crore it could not cover its budget. It was considered as a disaster by Box Office India.
