= Jolly LLB 3 =

2025 Indian film by Subhash Kapoor

- Theatrical release poster
- Directed by: Subhash Kapoor
- Written by: Subhash Kapoor
- Produced by: Alok Jain; Ajit Andhare
- Starring: Akshay Kumar; Arshad Warsi; Saurabh Shukla; Amrita Rao; Huma Qureshi; Gajraj Rao; Seema Biswas
- Cinematography: Rangarajan Ramabadran
- Edited by: Chandrashekhar Prajapati
- Music by: Songs: Aman Pant; Anurag Saikia; Vikram Montrose; Score: Mangesh Dhakde
- Production companies: Star Studio18; Kangra Talkies
- Distributed by: Star Studio18
- Release date: 19 September 2025
- Running time: 157 minutes
- Country: India
- Language: Hindi
- Budget: ₹120 crore
- Box office: est. ₹166.06 crore

Jolly LLB 3 is a 2025 Indian Hindi-language legal comedy drama film written and directed by Subhash Kapoor. It is the third installment in the Jolly LLB series and the sequel to Jolly LLB 2. The film stars Akshay Kumar, Arshad Warsi and Saurabh Shukla, with Amrita Rao and Huma Qureshi all reprising their roles from the previous films.

The film was released on 19 September 2025, and received generally positive reviews from critics. It was moderately successful at the box-office.

== Plot ==
The film begins with a preamble stating it is based on the real-life Bhatta Parsaul protests. The story opens in Bikaner, Rajasthan, where Rajaram Solanki, an elderly farmer and poet, loses his land to local developer Raghunath Bharadwaj through forged mortgage documents. Despite his daughter-in-law Varsha’s protests, the legal system ignores her for gender prejudice. Devastated, Rajaram writes a final poem and commits suicide.

A few years later, the two "Jollys" - Jagdish Tyagi (from Meerut) and Jagdishwar Mishra (from Kanpur) are both practicing as advocates in Delhi. Their identical nicknames cause constant friction and professional rivalry. When an NGO representing 40 protesting farmers from Parsaul approaches Tyagi, he spitefully redirects them to Mishra, believing the case to be a low-paying burden. However, Tyagi’s wife Sandhya, an activist, later convinces him to take up the case for Janki, Rajaram’s widow, pro bono.

The conflict centers on industrialist Haribhai Khaitan’s "Bikaner to Boston" project, a massive infrastructure plan supported by MLA Iqbal Singh Shekhawat and DM Avik Sengupta. To suppress the legal challenge, Khaitan’s aide Shrivastav hires Mishra to represent the corporation. The case is presided over by Justice Sunderlal Tripathi, who is exasperated to find both Jollys in his courtroom again. Mishra initially wins a dismissal of Janki’s complaint, earning him a lucrative position within Khaitan’s circle.

However, a confrontation with Janki changes Mishra’s perspective. He learns that Khaitan had previously tried to bribe Janki to silence her. When she refused, Khaitan’s machinery spread malicious rumors of an extramarital affair between Rajaram and Varsha, leading to Varsha’s suicide. Stricken by guilt and encouraged by his wife Pushpa, Mishra switches sides. In a symbolic act of defiance, the two Jollys disrupt a corporate car race on the project’s new racetrack using camels.

The case is reopened as Tyagi and Mishra join forces to represent Janki and the 40 villagers. Khaitan retaliates by flying in elite London-based lawyer Vikram Ray Chaudhary. During the proceedings, the Jollys' lack of polish initially makes their case crumble, but Justice Tripathi, citing the spirit of the law, grants them an extension to fix their affidavits.

Tensions escalate outside the courtroom. The district administration attempts to forcibly clear Parsaul. While the Jollys advocate for Satyagraha, MLA Shekhawat orchestrates a False flag operation, having a sniper shoot DM Sengupta to justify a police massacre. The resulting violence leaves nine villagers dead and Tyagi severely injured.

In the final hearing, Vikram Ray Chaudhary delivers a technocratic defense, arguing that for India to become a global power, the judiciary must protect industrialists and that the poor must make "sacrifices" for progress. Mishra counters by exposing the "Bikaner to Boston" project as a financial scam, funded by high-risk loans from nationalized banks and supported by biased economic reports. He details how Khaitan uses middle-men like Bharadwaj to defraud farmers.

The climax occurs when Tyagi enters the court with a surprise witness: DM Sengupta. Having survived the assassination attempt, Sengupta testifies about the bribes he received and confirms the bullet that hit him came from Shekhawat’s rifle. Tyagi delivers a scathing closing argument, showing photos of the homes of the wealthy elite and asking why their properties are never "sacrificed" for national progress.

Justice Tripathi rules in favor of the farmers, declaring the land acquisition illegal under the Land acquisition act. He orders a judicial inquiry into the deaths and the police violence. The film concludes with the Jollys being celebrated by the villagers to the chants of "Jai Jawan Jai Kisan" (Hail the Soldier, Hail the Farmer) and asks viewers to thank farmers for their next meal.

== Cast ==
- Akshay Kumar as Advocate Jagdishwar "Jolly" Mishra
- Arshad Warsi as Advocate Jagdish "Jolly" Tyagi
- Saurabh Shukla as Judge Sunder Lal Tripathi
- Amrita Rao as Sandhya Tyagi
- Huma Qureshi as Pushpa Mishra
- Seema Biswas as Janki Rajaram Solanki
- Gajraj Rao as Haribhai Khaitan
- Robin Das as Rajaram Solanki
- Ram Kapoor as Advocate Vikram Rai Chaudhary
- Avijit Dutt as Dr. Milind Desai
- Kharaj Mukherjee as DM Avik Sengupta
- Shilpa Shukla as Inspector Chanchal Chautala
- Sushil Pandey as Raghunath Bhardwaj
- Brijendra Kala as Advocate Jawed
- Shubhrajyoti Barat as Rajendra Chowdhary, Tahsildar-cum-Executive Magistrate
- Raman Atre as MLA Iqbal Singh Shekhawat
- Shrikant Verma as Shrivastav
- Vibha Chibber as Judge Poonam Aggarwal
- Sarah Hashmi as Varsha Solanki
- Rajshree Sawant as Laxmi Yadav, NGO head
- Vinod Suryavanshi as Birbal, Akshay Kumar's assistant

== Production ==
=== Development ===
The film was originally announced in February 2017 following the success of Jolly LLB 2. However, due to scripting work, the shooting was delayed. Akshay Kumar, Arshad Warsi, Saurabh Shukla, Amrita Rao and Huma Qureshi all reprise their roles from the previous two films. It marks the film comeback of Amrita Rao after six years.

=== Filming ===
Principal photography began on 2 May 2024. Filming took place in Rajasthan, primarily in Ajmer, which was wrapped in May 2024. Another filming took place in Mumbai, where extensive courtroom sequences were shot before moving to Madhya Pradesh. Filming wrapped up on 16 July 2024.

== Marketing ==
The teaser was released on 12 August 2025 and showed a courtroom face-off between the two Jollys. The trailer was launched at an event in Kanpur on 10 September 2025.

The film was promoted on Bigg Boss 19, The Great Indian Kapil Show and Aap Ki Adalat.

== Soundtrack ==
Jolly LLB 3

Soundtrack album by Aman Pant, Anurag Saikia and Vikram Montrose
- Released: 17 September 2025
- Studio: Panorama Music
- Genre: Feature film soundtrack
- Length: 12:44
- Language: Hindi
- Label: Panorama Music
External audio
- Official Audio Jukebox on YouTube

The songs of the film were composed by Aman Pant, Anurag Saikia and Vikram Montrose while the film score was composed by Mangesh Dhakde.

The first single titled "Bhai Vakeel Hai" was released on 20 August 2025. The second single titled "Glass Uchhi Rakhey" was released on 30 August 2025.

Track listing
No.	Title	Lyrics	Music	Singer(s)	Length
1.	"Bhai Vakeel Hai"	Pardhaan, Akhil Tiwari	Aman Pant	Aman Pant, KD Desirock, Akhil Tiwari	2:25
2.	"Glass Uchhi Rakhey"	Meggha Bali, Karan Kapadia	Vikram Montrose	Meggha Bali, Channa Ghuman, Karan Kapadia, Vikram Montrose	3:05
3.	"Ichakdana"	Pardhaan, Akhil Tiwari	Aman Pant	Divya Kumar, Akhil Tiwari, Pardhaan, Rajath Krishnan	3:11
4.	"Hua Na"	Puneet Sharma	Anurag Saikia	Papon	4:03
Total length:					12:44

== Release ==
=== Theatrical ===
The Central Board of Film Certification (CBFC) gave the film a U/A certificate with a 16+ rating and asked for some modifications to be made for certain dialogues and visuals. The film briefly faced a dispute with PVR INOX over the Virtual Print Fee (VPF). While the producers maintained that an existing agreement exempted its films from such charges, PVR INOX allegedly sought a payment of approximately ₹3.5 crore shortly before release and temporarily halted advance bookings. The issue was resolved after the producers agreed to the payment and ticket sales were subsequently restored. The film was theatrically released on 19 September 2025.

Multiple public interest litigations (PILs) were filled against the film, alleging that its trailer and the song "Bhai Vakeel Hai" mocked the judiciary and defamed the legal profession. However, the Allahabad High Court dismissed a plea to stay the film’s release, stating that it found nothing objectionable in the lyrics or trailer, while the Bombay High Court also rejected a similar petition, observing that judges are accustomed to criticism and not affected by satire. The Madhya Pradesh High Court issued notices over the song but no ban was imposed, and overall the courts held that the complaints did not meet the threshold of defamation or contempt.

=== Home media ===
The film digital streaming rights were acquired by Netflix It began streaming on the platform from 14 November 2025.

== Reception ==
=== Critical reception ===
Chirag Sehgal of News18 rated the film 4 stars out of 5 and wrote "Jolly LLB 3 is a fine example of how cinema can tackle pressing social issues with humour, without ever diluting their seriousness. The film seamlessly balances comedy and gravity, making the narrative both thought-provoking and highly entertaining. With its sharp writing and powerful performances, the film delivers a complete cinematic experience. It is pure entertainment and a must watch." Lachmi Deb Roy of Firstpost rated the film 4 stars out of 5 and wrote "On the whole, Jolly LLB 3 just like the previous two parts may not be as humorous, but recreates the charm and intensity that made the franchise iconic."

Bollywood Hungama rated the film 3.5 stars out of 5 and wrote "On the whole, Jolly LLB 3 entertains with its humour, emotions, hard-hitting dialogues, and drama in ample doses. Akshay Kumar, Arshad Warsi, and Saurabh Shukla steal the show, while the climax would be greeted with applause." Dhaval Roy of The Times of India rated the film 3.5 stars out of 5 and wrote "Jolly LLB 3 remains an engaging ride that keeps you entertained with its mix of courtroom drama and comic splits."

Vineeta Kumar of India Today rated the film 3.5 stars out of 5 and wrote "Akshay and Arshad's crowd-pleasing performances, powered by Shukla's winning presence, makes 'Jolly LLB 3' a hearty big-screen watch. It may not be the most refined courtroom drama, but it proves why this franchise continues to matter. 'Jolly LLB 3' makes you laugh, think, and cheer, all at the same time." Rishabh Suri of Hindustan Times rated the film 3.5 stars out of 5 and wrote "Overall, Jolly LLB 3 may not outshine the first two films, but it keeps the courtroom drama spirit alive with enough laughs and solid performances to make it a worthy addition to the series."

Tanmayi Savadi of Times Now rated the film 3 stars out of 5 and wrote "Jolly LLB 3 has the potential to be a clean and happy family entertainer. Slightly inclined towards preachy, it picks up soon and rectifies before ending up as a complete shipwreck." Shubhra Gupta of The Indian Express rated the film 2 stars out of 5 and wrote "I really enjoyed Jolly LLB part 2. But in this one, the story-telling is at its most basic, and it is far and away the weakest part of the franchise."

=== Box office ===
As of 11 November 2025, Jolly LLB 3 has grossed ₹166.06 crore (US$17 million) worldwide.
