= Ab Ke Baras =

- Poster
- Directed by: Raj Kanwar
- Written by: Robin Bhatt; Sutanu Gupta
- Produced by: Raj Kanwar
- Starring: Arya Babbar; Amrita Rao
- Cinematography: Ishwar R. Bidri
- Edited by: Kuldip Mehan
- Music by: Anu Malik
- Production company: Inderjit Films Combines
- Release date: 10 May 2002
- Running time: 169 minutes
- Country: India
- Language: Hindi

Ab Ke Baras (transl. This Year) is a 2002 Indian Hindi-language romantic action film directed by Raj Kanwar, starring Amrita Rao and Arya Babbar in their acting debuts.

== Plot ==
Anjali Thapar, a young woman living in the United States, is troubled by recurring dreams of a previous life in India involving a temple of Durga and armed horsemen. A pandit advises her to travel to India to uncover the truth behind these visions. Her father refuses to let her go unless she marries a man of his choosing, prompting Anjali to run away.

While evading her uncle, DCP Sikander Baksh, a determined CBI officer tasked with bringing her home, Anjali meets Karan, a small-time car thief, and his uncle. The two travel together to India, where Anjali begins to recall memories of a past life as Nandini, a woman in love with the freedom fighter Abhay. In those memories, Abhay was betrayed and killed by Tejeshwar Singhal, a collaborator of the British authorities.

During their journey, Anjali and Karan become entangled with the criminal Rudra Singh and his gang, who are searching for a cache of illegal weapons. Karan is seriously wounded during an escape attempt but survives after being rescued by a local doctor. Meanwhile, Anjali is taken to a mansion belonging to Tejeshwar's family, where she discovers that Tejeshwar is now a powerful politician.

Anjali befriends Tejeshwar's son Rajvir, who becomes attracted to her and introduces her to his family. Using Rajvir's trust, she gathers information about the family's illegal activities and hidden wealth. When Rajvir discovers her intentions and attempts to kill her, Karan intervenes and kills him in self-defense. Suspicion for Rajvir's death falls on Rudra Singh.

Anjali and Karan continue exposing Tejeshwar's criminal operations, leading to the destruction of his illegal arms and financial networks. As Tejeshwar attempts to flee the country with Anjali as a hostage, a police operation led by Sikander Baksh intercepts his helicopter. Tejeshwar and his elder son are killed during the confrontation, and Anjali is rescued.

After the case is resolved, Sikander Baksh acknowledges Karan's role in bringing Tejeshwar to justice. He symbolically joins Karan and Anjali together with a pair of handcuffs, signifying their union and shared future.

== Cast ==
- Arya Babbar as Karan / Abhay
- Amrita Rao as Anjali Thapar / Nandini
- Ashutosh Rana as Tejeshwar Singhal
- Danny Denzongpa as CBI Officer Sikander Baksh
- Ghanshyam as Kancha
- Ashish Vidyarthi as Rudra Singh
- Shakti Kapoor as BMW
- Vishwajeet Pradhan as Bali
- Vivek Shauq as Nainsukh Pathak
- Nina Kulkarni as Prerna
- Mohan Joshi as Raghuvir Singh
- Dolly Minhas as Abhay Sister
- Rajat Bedi as Rajbir Singhal
- Manoj Joshi as Iyer
- Snehal Dabi as Nayyar
- Hemant Pandey as Hotel / Lodge Manager
- Yusuf Hussain

== Soundtrack ==
Ab Ke Baras

Soundtrack album by Anu Malik
- Released: 16 March 2002
- Genre: Feature film soundtrack
- Label: T-Series

The music of the film was composed by Anu Malik.

No.	Title	Lyrics	Singer(s)	Length
1.	"Deewane Aate Jaate"	Sameer	Sonu Nigam, Alka Yagnik, Kunal Ganjawala
2.	"Main Pyaar Mein Hoon"	Sameer	Anuradha Paudwal, Shaan
3.	"Saari Umar Main Rahun"	Sameer	Sonu Nigam
4.	"Aaya Mahi"	Sameer	Sukhwinder Singh, Richa Sharma, Sunidhi Chauhan
5.	"Mujhe Rab Se Pyaar"	Sameer	Adnan Sami, Anuradha Sriram
6.	"Hoga Hoga"	Sameer	Sonu Nigam, Preeti & Pinky
7.	"Pyaar Mohabbat"	Sameer	Udit Narayan, Anuradha Paudwal
8.	"Aawara Dil (Club Mix)"	Sameer	Sonu Nigam, Anuradha Paudwal
9.	"Pyaar Mohabbat (sad)"	Sameer	Sonu Nigam, Anuradha Paudwal

== Reception ==
Priyanka Bhattacharya of Rediff.com wrote, ″Director Raj Kanwar uses the tried-and-tested reincarnation formula. But he seems to lose focus somewhere along the film. So in spite of a decent beginning, the film gets hopelessly melodramatic and irksome post interval.″
