= Deewaar: Let's Bring Our Heroes Home =

2004 Indian film by Milan Luthria

- Directed by: Milan Luthria
- Written by: Milan Luthria
- Screenplay by: Shridhar Raghavan; Gaurang Doshi
- Story by: S. Gopala Reddy; Milan Luthria
- Produced by: Gaurang Doshi
- Starring: Amitabh Bachchan; Akshaye Khanna; Sanjay Dutt; Amrita Rao; Sanjay Narvekar; Aditya Srivastava
- Cinematography: Nirmal Jani
- Edited by: Hozefa Lokhandwala
- Music by: Aadesh Shrivastav
- Distributed by: V. R. Pictures
- Release date: 25 June 2004
- Running time: 161 mins
- Country: India
- Language: Hindi
- Budget: ₹210 million
- Box office: ₹286 million

Deewaar: Let's Bring Our Heroes Home (transl. The Wall) is a 2004 Indian Hindi-language action thriller film directed by Milan Luthria, produced by Gaurang Doshi and written by Luthria, Doshi, S. Gopala Reddy. The film stars Amitabh Bachchan, Akshaye Khanna, Sanjay Dutt and Amrita Rao. It has no connection to the 1975 film Deewaar, also starring Bachchan, and is inspired by the 1963 film The Great Escape.

Deewaar: Let's Bring Our Heroes Home released worldwide on 25 June 2004 and received mixed-to-positive reviews from critics, with praise for the performances of Bachchan, Khanna and Dutt, but criticism for its length and pacing. Commercially, the film was average. A similar story plot inspired by this movie was used 19 years later in the blockbuster Bollywood movie Gadar 2 (2023).

== Plot ==
Indian Army Major Ranvir Kaul and some 30 of his colleagues were captured in Pakistan and held under brutal conditions for 33 years (since the Indo-Pakistani War of 1971). Kaul attempts another escape but is caught, beaten, berated, and thrown back in prison. During the fracas, one of his men does flee and, through a sympathetic friend, Jabbar, sends a letter home. Kaul's wife and son petition the Indian Army, but the General, though sympathetic, has his hands tied. He raises the subject, and Pakistan will deny it, and immediately the men will be shot; he cannot authorize Army action absent hard evidence (not just a letter); there are no other options. Kaul's son, Gaurav sets off to find his father.

Gaurav meets Jabbar and discovers that his father has been transferred to a different prison camp, Saran Jail, under the cunning and sadistic warden Sohail Miyaan. Kaul meets another set of captured Indian POWs at this new prison. Kaul attempts another escape. One man sacrifices himself on the electric fence as others go through. Sohail bemusedly sighs as the others, once past the fence, are blown up by the landmines. Kaul and the remaining prisoners are again beaten and kicked back into their barracks. One of the prisoners, Khan, manages to evade the landmines and escapes. Gaurav meets him accidentally and brings him to safety.

Gaurav attacks a military courier and, in the very act of using his uniforms, infiltrates a Pakistan Army office block. He steals a set of plans that reveal a water main under the prison. His father and the men can dig their way to this main and crawl out. With great reluctance, Khan gets arrested again. Sohail correctly guesses that Khan is back for a reason. Khan discloses to Kaul that his son is here; this news, and the water main, is a great inspiration for the men.

The men quietly begin digging a tunnel to the water main. They discover the body of an Indian Army Captain Jatin in the debris under the prison, but this Jatin is among them! Khan and Kaul realize that he is, in fact, a Pakistani spy. Gaurav and Khan had planned the escape for the night of the tenth, and Jatin, the spy, had dutifully reported this back to Sohail. Kaul and Khan decide that the escape will happen on the ninth. Jatin is not told of this, but the men manage to send a coded message to Gaurav. The following day Khan notices the number 9 scrawled on an army supply truck entering the prison; it is Gaurav's reply. He will await the men near the water main outlet on the ninth.

On the night of the escape, the men overpower the guards and kill Jatin. They enter the water main and begin digging away the last few meters of remaining debris. The knocking in the pipes travels up to Sohail's kitchen sink; Sohail quickly discovers the escape and hotly pursues the men down the pipe. Gaurav digs from the other side, and, just in the nick of time, the debris is cleared, and father and son are reunited. The men make it through. One of them sacrifices himself on a land mine inside the water main, which caves in and blocks Sohail.

Gaurav leads his father and the men to a railway line, but the train is delayed. The men split up to avoid detection and arranged to meet at dawn near a border point. They arrive at the border point, but Sohail and his men are in close pursuit. There is a firefight. Khan puts up a brave fight but is shot down. Ranvir Kaul and Gaurav and the handful of remaining prisoners finally get across the border in a Pakistani army truck. Sohail is right behind them, but his Jeep is disarmed, and he is surrounded by Kaul and the prisoners. Kaul points to the borderline behind them; they are now on Indian soil. Kaul, now an Indian Army soldier, attacks and kills Sohail in hand-to-hand combat and throws his body across the border.

The film ends as Ranvir Kaul and his men are reinstated in the Indian Army and salute the Indian tricolor.

== Cast ==
- Amitabh Bachchan as Maj. Ranvir Kaul, Gaurav's father.
- Akshaye Khanna as Gaurav Kaul, Ranvir's son.
- Piyush Mishra as Qureshi
- Amrita Rao as Radhika Saluja, Jabbar's daughter and Gaurav's love interest.
- Sanjay Dutt as Khan, Ranvir's fellow prisoner.
- Raghuvir Yadav as Jata
- Kay Kay Menon as Sohail Miyaan
- Nishikant Dixit as Capt. Ajit Verma
- Aditya Srivastava as Eijaz Shaikh
- Rajendranath Zutshi as Capt. Jatin Kumar / Pakistan spy
- Akhilendra Mishra as Jabbar Saluja, Radhika's father.
- Tanuja as Ranvir Kaul's wife and Gaurav's mother.
- Pradeep Rawat as Baldev
- Arif Zakaria as Rajan
- D. Santosh as P.O.W. Raghu Jen
- Kamlesh Sawant as Nayyar
- Sanjay Narvekar as Marathe
- Rajendra Gupta as Anand
- Ashraful Haque as Naru

== Soundtrack ==
Music for the film was composed by Aadesh Shrivastav. The lyrics were written by Nusrat Badr.

Track list

No.	Title	Singer(s)	Length
1.	"Ali Ali"	Krishna Beura, Shraddha Pandit, Vijayta	5:57
2.	"Chaliye Va Chaliye"	Udit Narayan, Roop Kumar Rathod	5:56
3.	"Kara Kaga"	Alka Yagnik	4:19
4.	"Marhaba Marhaba"	Sonu Nigam, Xenia Ali	5:18
5.	"Piya Bawri"	Alka Yagnik, Kailash Kher	4:52
6.	"Todenge Deewaar Hum"	Udit Narayan, Mukul Agrawal	4:43

== Critical reception ==
Taran Adarsh rated the film 3/5 and stated: "DEEWAAR has an impressive cast, but it is Amitabh Bachchan who towers above all with a splendid and power-packed performance. The actor seems to be accomplishing the unattainable with every film [...] Sanjay Dutt is in form yet again. Although his role isn't as well defined as that of Big B or Akshaye Khanna, Dutt comes up with an extremely likeable performance that is sure to win him plaudits from the viewers. His dialogues are well worded and are sure to appeal to the masses. Akshaye Khanna is a treat to watch. The youngster proves yet again that he is amongst the most gifted actors of the present generation. Amrita Rao is wasted". Derek Elley of Variety stated, "Though its Indo-Pak politics are more Rambo than Romeo, as a barnstorming, jingoistic action movie, Deewaar delivers".

== See also ==
- Prisoners of war during the Indo-Pakistani War of 1971
- The missing 54, Indian POWs missing since the Indo-Pakistani War of 1971
- 1971 (2007 film), another Indian film about POWs from the 1971 war
