= Game Paisa Ladki =

2018 Hindi-language film

- Directed by: Sachin Agarwal
- Written by: Sajan Agarwal
- Produced by: Atul Patel
- Starring: Deepaansh Garg, Sezal Sharma,Zakhir Hussain
- Cinematography: Pradeep M.Gupta
- Edited by: Irfan Ishak
- Music by: Dev Sikdar
- Production company: Modern Moviee Pvt.Ltd
- Distributed by: Modern Moviee Pvt. Ltd.
- Release date: 21 September 2018
- Country: India
- Language: Hindi

Game Paisa Ladki is a 2018 Indian erotic thriller film produced by Atul Patel. It was theatrically released in India on 21 September 2018. The film stars Zakir Hussain, Sitaram Panchal, Ashraful Haque and Sezal Sharma. Zakir Hussain plays the role of a psycho lover.

== Plot ==
After Nazuk loses her lover Raj and her family, circumstances force a naïve girl to become a gangster's mistress. However, she plans to extort money from the gangster and his accomplices. Both decide to do something dangerous. Don also has a boss, by murdering the boss, this don himself becomes the boss and runs the gang by keeping the delicate under control, and in the end, this delicate also kills her lover Raj and divides it with 10 crores of rupees. Going

== Cast ==
- Deepaansh Garg
- Sezal Sharma
- Bhavini Jani
- Zakir Hussain
- Sitaram Panchal
- Ashraful Haque
- Ishtiyak Khan

== Production ==
Game Paisa Ladki was produced by Modern Moviee Pvt. Ltd.

== Soundtrack ==
The soundtrack of the movie was composed by Dev Sikdar.

- Aiyyashian - Aman Trikha, Neha Kakkar, Varun Likhate
- Naadan Dil - Amit Gupta, Madhavi Shrivastav
- Makhmali Badan - Kunal Ganjawala, Madhavi Shrivastav
- Naadan Dil Reprise - Sabar Koti, Madhvi Shrivastav
- Nasha - Amit Gupta
- Samjhe Janab - Sonu Kakkar
- Game Paisa Ladki - Sabar Koti, Dev Sikdar
