= Sitaram Panchal =

Indian actor (1963–2017)

- Born: 1963; Narwana, Haryana, India
- Died: 10 August 2017 (aged 54); Mumbai, India
- Occupation: Actor
- Years active: 1994–2017

Sitaram Panchal (1963 – 10 August 2017) was an Indian actor known for his roles in Slumdog Millionaire (2008), Peepli Live (2010), The Legend of Bhagat Singh (2002) and Jolly LLB 2 (2017).

== Death ==
He was suffering from kidney and lung cancer. Haryana Government gave ₹5 lakh in financial help to the actor. CINTAA have also put out a plea to gather help for Panchal. He died on 10 August 2017 in Mumbai, India

== Filmography ==
- Bandit Queen (1995)
- Lajja (2001)
- Shakti: The Power (2002)
- The Legend of Bhagat Singh (2002)
- Peepli Live (2010)
- Halla Bol (2008)
- Slumdog Millionaire (2008)
- Sau Jhooth Ek Sach (2010)
- 10ml LOVE (2010)
- Shagird (2011)
- Saheb, Biwi Aur Gangster (2011)
- Saheb, Biwi Aur Gangster Returns (2011)
- Yeh Khula Aasmaan (2012)
- Ammaa Ki Boli (2012)
- Paan Singh Tomar (2012)
- Saare Jahaan Se Mehnga (2013)
- Ammaa Ki Boli (2013)
- Bumper Draw (2015)
- Rebellious Flower (2016)
- Bhouri (2016)
- Jolly LLB 2 (2017)
- Ekkees Tareekh Shubh Muhurat (2018)
- Game Paisa Ladki (2018)

== Television ==
- Looteri Dulhan (2011)
- Ek Ghar Banaunga (2014)
- Office Office as Gowardhan (1999)
