= Vikram Montrose =

Indian music composer

- Born: 22 July 1987 (age 39); Prayagraj, Uttar Pradesh, India
- Genres: Film score, hip hop, indi-pop, R&B, rock
- Occupations: Music director, singer, music producer & songwriter
- Instruments: Piano, guitar, drums
- Years active: 2012– Present
- Labels: T-Series, Zee Music, Venus Music

Vikram Montrose is an Indian composer, singer, songwriter and music producer who works in Hindi cinema. He is known for composing music for the song "Kar Har Maidaan Fateh" for the 2018 film Sanju.

== Early life ==
Vikram Montrose was born in a Catholic family to Rama Montrose and Noel Bernard Montrose. He gained his early training in music from his mother and at his church and learned to play the piano, guitar and drums while he was still in school.

He went to St. Joseph's College Allahabad. Vikram Montrose started producing songs in 2012, during this time, he was spotted and offered a chance to compose songs for a film Hasmukh Pighal Gaya by Sanjay Dutt.

It was Sanjay Dutt who introduced Vikram Montrose to Raj Kumar Hirani for the movie Sanju. Vikram Montrose composed Kar Har Maidan Fateh and Baba Bolta has for Sanju which marked his arrival.

== Career ==
Vikram Montrose began his career with Sanjay Dutt's production debut film Hasmukh Pighal Gaya for which he composed the entire album. In 2016 Vikram Montrose collaborated with Sophie Choudry for a single for Venus music. In the same year 2016 Vikram Montrose gave music for Marathi movie "BHAY" for which he composed the entire Album. In 2017, Vikram Montrose composed another single "Zariya" for Zee music. Vikram Montrose followed up with another single "Bin tere Sanam", a re-creation.

Vikram Montrose debuted in Hindi film industry with Sanju in 2018 for which he composed the successful "Kar Har Maidan Fateh" and "Baba Bolta Hai’.

Sanju and the song "Kar Her Maidan Fateh" were critically and commercially successful. And Kar Har Maidan Fateh was immensely popular with the masses.

In 2019, Vikram Montrose composed three songs for Sanjay Dutt starrer Prassthanam "Haji Ali", "Chaaro Khaane Chit" and "Dil Bewda."

In 2019, Vikram composed two songs for the film Commando 3 which included the songs "Tera Baap Aaya" and "Iraade Kar Buland.”

In 2025, Vikram composed a single ahead of Shivratri called Mahakal Chalo, sung by Akshay Kumar, Palash Sen and Vikram himself.

== Discography ==
Year	Movie	Track	Singer(s)	Writer(s)
2018	Sanju	"Kar Har Maidan Fateh"	Sukhwinder Singh, Shreya Ghoshal	Shekhar Astitva
2018	Sanju	"Baba Bolta Hai"	Papon, Ranbir Kapoor, Supriya Pathak	Puneet Sharma, Abhijat Joshi & Rohan
2019	Prassthanam	"Haji Ali"	Sukhwinder Singh	Atique Allahabadi
2019	Prassthanam	"Charo Khaane Chit"	Sukhwinder Singh	Yash Eshwari
2019	Prassthanam	"Dil Bewda"	Mika Singh, Bhoomi Trivedi	Shekhar Astitva
2019	Commando 3	"Tera Baap Aaya"	Farhad Bhiwandiwala	Farhad Bhiwandiwala, Vikram Montrose
2019	Commando 3	"Iraade Kar Bauland"	Sukhwinder Singh, Vikram Montrose	Vikram Montrose, Azeem Shirazi
2021	Shershaah	"Jai Hind Ki Senaa"	Vikram Montrose	Manoj Muntashir
2022	Bachchhan Paandey	"Maar Khayegaa"	Vikram Montrose, Farhad Bhiwandiwala	Farhad Bhiwandiwala, Vikram Montrose, Azeem Dayani
2022	Liger	"The Liger Hunt Theme"	Farhad Bhiwandiwala	Farhad Bhiwandiwala, Shekhar Astitva, Vikram Montrose
2022	Liger	"Attack"	Farhad Bhiwandiwala	Farhad Bhiwandiwala
2022	Ram Setu	"Jai Shree Ram"	Vikram Montrose	
2022	Mere Desh Ki Dharti	"Mrere Desh Ki Dharti"	Sukhwinder Singh	Azeem Shirazi
2022	Mere Desh Ki Dharti	"Khudaya Re"	Ali Aslam Shah	Azeem Shirazi
2022	Mere Desh Ki Dharti	"Tip Top"	Supriya Pathak, Farhad Bhiwandiwala	Azeem Shirazi
2022	Mere Desh Ki Dharti	"Jallad Zindagi"	Divya Kumar	Azeem Shirazi, Vikram Montrose
2022	Mere Desh Ki Dharti	"Naagan Naach"	Nakash Aziz	Azeem Shirazi, Vikram Montrose, Faraz Haider
2023	Selfiee	"Sher"	MC Square	Abhinav Shekhar
2023	Selfiee	"Vaar"	Abhinav Shekhar, Aslam Shah	
2023	IB71	"Vijayi Bhavi"	Shadaab Faridi	Abhinav Shekhar
2023	OMG 2	"Har Har Mahadev"	Vikram Montrose	Shekhar Astitwa
2024	Tauba Tera Jalwa	"Tauba Tera Jalwa"	Vikram Montrose	Kunwar Juneja
2024	Crakk	"Crakk -Title Track"	Vikram Montrose, Paradox	Shekhar Astitwa, Paradox
2024	Crakk	"Khel"	Vikram Montrose, Abhinav Shekhar	
2024	Kill	"Jaako Raakhe Saiyaan"	Vikram Montrose, Monu Rathod	Shekhar Astitwa
2025	Jolly LLB 3	"Glass Uchhi Rakhey"	Meggha Bali, Channa Ghuman, Karan Kapadia, Vikram Montrose	Meggha Bali, Karan Kapadia
2026	"Ucha Lamba Kad Forever"	Anand Raj Anand, Rubai	Anand Raaj Anand, Meggha Bali	
2026	"Ghis Ghis Ghis"	Vikram Montrose, Supriyaa Paathak	Abhinav Shekhar	
2026	"Tera Paisa Mera Paisa"	Akshay Kumar, Farhad Bhiwandiwala, Rubai, Vikram Montrose	Meggha Bali	
2026	"Tera Paisa Mera Paisa" (Marathi Version)	Farhad Bhiwandiwala, Vikram Montrose	Meggha Bali	
2026	"Tera Paisa Mera Paisa" (Punjabi Version)	Farhad Bhiwandiwala, Vikram Montrose	Meggha Bali	
2026	"Tera Paisa Mera Paisa" (Tamil Version)	Farhad Bhiwandiwala, Vikram Montrose	Meggha Bali	
2026	"Tera Paisa Mera Paisa" (Gujarati Version)	Farhad Bhiwandiwala, Vikram Montrose	Meggha Bali	
2026	"Tera Paisa Mera Paisa" (Sindhi Version)	Farhad Bhiwandiwala, Vikram Montrose	Meggha Bali	
2026	"Tera Paisa Mera Paisa" (Bengali Version)	Farhad Bhiwandiwala, Vikram Montrose	Meggha Bali	

== See also ==
- List of Indian film music directors
- List of Indian composers
