= Avijit Dutt =

Indian filmmaker, actor, theater director and author

- Education: Calcutta University
- Occupations: Actor, filmmaker, theatre director, author
- Years active: 1972–present

Avijit Dutt is an Indian filmmaker, actor, theatre director, and author.

== Early life and education ==
Dutt received a master's degree in English Literature from Calcutta University. He married Piu Dutt, The couple have two daughters.

== Career ==
Dutt began his career as an English teacher at St. Paul's School in Darjeeling.

He has worked in English, Hindi, and Bengali theatre as both actor and director.

His plays include:

- Bamboo Flower
- Mahatma Mar Gaya
- Bombay! Bosnia!
- Breaking News
- Noor Jahan- An Empress Reveals
- Unspeakable
- 9.45 ki Express ki Citee

He has also dramatised 1084 ki Ma, by Mahasweta Devi, with Shyamanand Jalan.

== Other activities and roles ==
Dutt has applied for two patents, one for a toilet solution and another for a process of collecting, testing, and documenting blood tests.

He is director of his organisation Enable, which has built toilets across North India. By 2017, the organization has reached more than 60,000 beneficiaries across 68 villages in India.

== Filmography ==
=== Films ===
Key
†	Denotes films that have not yet been released

Year	Film	Role	Notes
1996	Kama Sutra: A Tale of Love	Vazir	
1996	Fire	Julie's father	
2004	Bow Barracks Forever	Melville	
2004	Chai Pani Etc.	Mr. Bose	
2005	Amu	Neel	
2006	The Bong Connection	Actor	
2010	Peepli Live	Boss of English TV Channel	
2011	No One Killed Jessica	BM Pandit	
2011	Gandhi to Hitler	MK Gandhi	
2013	Madras Cafe	Swarup	
2015	The Second Best Exotic Marigold Hotel	Nimish	
2015	Piku	Bodo Mesho	
2016	Land of the Gods	Sunder	
2017	Jolly LLB 2	VK Paul	
2017	Kashmir	Father	
2017	The Complaint	The Old Man	
2018	2.0	Dr. Sam	Tamil film
2021	Hum Do Hamare Do	Jagmohan Deewan	
2023	Mission Majnu	Morarji Desai	Netflix film
2025	Raid 2	Lawyer Malani	
2025	Bayaan		Premiered at the 2025 Toronto International Film Festival
2025	Jolly LLB 3	Dr. Milind Desai	
2025	Hamlet	Ghost	British film

=== Television and web series ===
Year	Title	Role	Platform	Notes
2019	The Verdict – State vs Nanavati	V. K. Krishna Menon	ALTBalaji and ZEE5	
2019	Inside Edge Season 2 & 3	Basu	Amazon Prime	
2019	Delhi Crime	Gururaj Dixit	Netflix	
2019	Hostages	Iman Roy	Hotstar	
2019	Abhay	Kunal Kemmu	Zee5	
2023	Tooth Pari: When Love Bites	Ian Zachariah	Netflix	
2023	Made in Heaven	Judge P. S. Murthy	Prime Video	
2025	Karma Korma	Chef	Hoichoi	

== Theatre ==
Avijit Dutt has been active in theatre as an actor, director and playwright, and has been associated with several stage productions. In 2019, he appeared in the stage play Patte Khul Gaye, produced by Rahul Bhuchar under the banner of Felicity Theatre.
