= Say Salaam India =

- Directed by: Subhash Kapoor
- Written by: Subhash Kapoor; Sanjay Chauhan (dialogue)
- Produced by: Harish Amin; Guneet Monga; Kamlesh Agarwal; Dimple Kharbanda; Rakesh Andania; Subhash Kapoor
- Starring: Sanjay Suri; Milind Soman; Sandhya Mridul; Aditya Seal
- Cinematography: Fasahat Khan
- Edited by: Mohammed Rafique
- Music by: Gaurav Dayal; Gauhar Raza (lyrics)
- Production companies: Credence Motion Pictures; Speaking Tree Films
- Release date: 30 March 2007
- Country: India
- Language: Hindi

Say Salaam India is a 2007 Indian Hindi-language sports drama film, written and directed by Subhash Kapoor. The film stars Sanjay Suri, Milind Soman, Anuj Pandit Sharma, and Sandhya Mridul. The film revolves around a group of four boys and their passion for the sport.

== Plot ==
The film begins by introducing four boys, Viru, Mahi, Shakeel and Guri, and how they fight their circumstances and lack of resources to pursue their love of cricket. Meanwhile, in the elite Royal Heritage School in the state capital, a cricket coach Hari Sadu has the task of coaching the school team to win their sixth state championship, but faces opposition to his coaching methods by players on the team, who are talented but unwilling to work hard to improve. This leads to tension between the coach and players, which leads to Hari Sadu being wrongfully accused and fired by the board of members, replaced by Harry Oberoi, a suave fixer from the cricket world who suits the image and profile of the school.

Hari Sadu is determined to make a local team to compete at the Inter-School Challenge, with the help of his wife Sonali and his cerebral palsy-suffering son Rustam. He develops a cricketing eleven from the wrestling team at the local corporation school, overcoming various hurdles to take on the Royal Heritage School at the Inter-School Challenge. The boys come from humble backgrounds and limited resources but have a passion for cricket and natural talent.

== Cast ==
- Mandar Jadhav as Viru
- Sanjay Suri as Hari Sadu
- Milind Soman as Harry Oberoi
- Sandhya Mridul as Sonali
- Sachin Khedekar as Goswami "Gossy"
- Manoj Pahwa as Surinder Huda
- Madhur Mittal as Shakeel
- Anuj Pandit Sharma as Guri
- Vinay Pathak
- Aditya Seal as Siddharth
- Ojas Bavishi as Rustum

== Soundtrack ==
- "Chaal Murkhiyon Waali" — Labh Janjua
- "Chaal Murkhiyon Waali" (Remix) — Labh Janjua
- "Haiya Haiya" — Naresh Iyer
- "Kainthewala" — Bill Singh
- "Kamli" — Jaspinder Narula
- "Tana Re Bana Re" (Female) — Shubha Mudgal
- "Tana Re Bana Re" (Male) — Sonu Nigam
- "Tana Re Bana Re" (Male Remix) — Sonu Nigam
