= Vaah! Life Ho Toh Aisi! =

2005 film by Mahesh .V. Manjrekar

- Theatrical release poster
- Directed by: Mahesh Manjrekar
- Written by: Mahesh Manjrekar; Kiran Kotrial
- Produced by: Sangeetha Ahir
- Starring: Shahid Kapoor; Sanjay Dutt; Amrita Rao; Arshad Warsi; Mohnish Bahl; Prem Chopra; Sharat Saxena
- Cinematography: Vijay Kumar Arora; Dennys Ilic
- Edited by: Merzin Tavaria
- Music by: Songs: Himesh Reshammiya; Guest Composers: Ajay–Atul; Background Score: Salim–Sulaiman
- Production companies: Aavishkaar Films; Prime Focus
- Distributed by: UTV Motion Pictures
- Release date: 23 December 2005
- Running time: 132 minutes
- Country: India
- Language: Hindi
- Budget: ₹ 120 million
- Box office: ₹ 190 million

Vaah! Life Ho Toh Aisi! (transl. Wow! That is what life should be like!) is a 2005 Indian Hindi-language fantasy comedy film written and directed by Mahesh Manjrekar, and produced by Sangeetha Ahir. The film stars Shahid Kapoor, Sanjay Dutt, Amrita Rao, Radhika Apte, and Arshad Warsi. It was released on 23 December 2005.

The film draws inspiration from the films Mudhal Thethi, It's a Wonderful Life, Naukri, Ghost and Bruce Almighty.

== Plot ==
Aditya Verma, fondly called Adi Chachu or Adi Uncle (Shahid Kapoor) by the children of his brothers (Adi has two brothers; one died in a plane crash along with his wife), lives in a large mansion in Mumbai with his other brother (Mohnish Bahl) who has a drinking problem, sister-in-law, sister, and grandmother. He is the only working member in the family. He falls in love with a tuition teacher, Piya (Amrita Rao). They confess their feelings for each other and plan to get married. However, while going to work to attend an important meeting, Adi is run over by a truck while trying to save Parth (Parth Dave) and dies.

In the afterlife, he meets the Hindu god of death, Yama (Sanjay Dutt), a kind-hearted, emotional deity with designer clothes and a red car. Yamraj allows Adi to go back to Earth as a ghost to stop his evil uncle (Prem Chopra), who wants to sell Adi's mansion to industrialist Hirachand (Sharat Saxena). Adi enlists the aid of Shakti, a little boy who was being taken with Adi to heaven, to save his family home. At first, they reach Earth, but no one can listen, see, or feel them. Then they meet Fakira Bhai B.P.C.M. (Arshad Warsi), who gives them the power to touch humans as before they were not able to, and then for his family, Yamraj comes and gives him the ability to see his family for a couple of minutes before he takes the both of them back—Shakti and Adi. When Adi's family sees Adi, they ask Yamraj to take them as well, as they do not want to live without Adi. Yamraj gets emotional and leaves him to stay with his family and the little boy Shakti also. When the family members wake up, they think that this was a bad dream, but only Adi and Shakti know that they died and came back to life. A film actor and Yamraj's lookalike, Sanjay Dutt, offers to buy Adi's property, but Adi refuses to sell his property and lives happily with Piya and his family.

== Cast ==
- Sanjay Dutt as Yamraj M.A. Maut ka Aayojak and himself Sanjay Dutt
- Shahid Kapoor as Aditya Verma aka Adi
- Amrita Rao as Piya, Aditya's love interest.
- Arshad Warsi as Fakira B.P.C.M. (Bhoot Pret se Connecting Medium)
- Prem Chopra as Harish
- Radhika Apte as Anjali
- Adil Badshah as Shakti
- Shweta Basu Prasad as Shweta
- Vivek Shauq as Vishal Sharma
- Upasna Singh as Kitty Sharma, Vishal's wife.
- Suhasini Mulay as Dadi
- Sharat Saxena as Hirachand
- Mohnish Behl as Sunil Verma (Voice dubbed by Ganesh Divekar)
- Rajat Bedi as Punky
- Palak Jain as Palak
- Aman Verma as Magic show presenter
- Smita Jaykar as Piya's mother
- Parth Dave as Parth
- Ishaan Khatter as Ishaan
- Satya Manjrekar as Satya
- Ekta Sohini as Sunita
- Tanvi Hegde as Tanvi
- Syed Hussain Haider Abidi as Sunny
- Shivangi Kale as Shivangi
- Darshil Mashru as Chandu
- Sagar Kabbur as Vikram "Vicky", Aditya's friend.
- Atul Kale as Bahadur
- Sanjeeda Sheikh as an item number in "Teri Yaad Yaad"
- Aamir Dalvi as Rohit, Anjali's fiancé.

== Soundtrack ==
#	Title	Singer(s)	Lyrics	Composer
1	"Chaahenge Tumhe"	Udit Narayan, Shreya Ghoshal	Sameer	Himesh Reshammiya
2	"Dil Ke Maare Hai"	Udit Narayan, Alka Yagnik	Sameer	Himesh Reshammiya
3	"Koi Aap Jaisa"	Kunal Ganjawala, Madhushree	Sameer	Himesh Reshammiya
4	"Pyaar Mein Tere"	Sonu Nigam, Shreya Ghoshal	Sameer	Himesh Reshammiya
5	"Hanuman Chalisa"	Shankar Mahadevan, Ajay	Sameer	Ajay–Atul
6	"Teri Yaad Yaad"	K.K., Jayesh Gandhi	Sameer	Himesh Reshammiya
