= Jolly LLB 2 =

2017 Indian film by Subhash Kapoor

- Theatrical release poster
- Directed by: Subhash Kapoor
- Written by: Subhash Kapoor
- Starring: Akshay Kumar; Annu Kapoor; Huma Qureshi; Saurabh Shukla
- Cinematography: Kamaljeet Negi
- Edited by: Chandrashekhar Prajapati
- Music by: Songs: Manj Musik; Meet Bros; Chirrantan Bhatt; Vishal Khurana K Score: Vishal Khurana K Amar Mohile
- Production company: Fox Star Studios
- Distributed by: Fox Star Studios
- Release date: 10 February 2017 (India)
- Running time: 137 minutes
- Country: India
- Language: Hindi
- Budget: ₹80 crore
- Box office: est. ₹197.33 crore

Jolly LLB 2 (marketed as The State vs. Jolly LL.B 2) is a 2017 Indian Hindi-language legal comedy drama film written and directed by Subhash Kapoor. A standalone sequel to the 2013 film Jolly LLB, it stars Akshay Kumar as Jagdishwar Mishra, with Huma Qureshi, Annu Kapoor, and Kumud Mishra in supporting roles. Saurabh Shukla, Sanjay Mishra, and Brijendra Kala reprise their characters from the original film.

Based in Lucknow, the story follows a lawyer who fights a case against a ruthless and powerful advocate to bring justice to the deceased victim of a fake encounter involving a corrupt police officer and a terrorist presumed dead.

Jolly LL.B. 2 opened worldwide on 10 February 2017, and made on an investment of ₹450 million (US$4.8 million), earned ₹2 billion (US$21 million) worldwide to become a major critical and commercial success, with praise for the writing and execution by Subhash Kapoor, as well as the performances of Kumar, Shukla and Kapoor, as well as Mishra.

A sequel titled Jolly LLB 3 was released on 19 September 2025.

== Plot ==
Jagdishwar "Jolly" Mishra is a Lucknow-based lawyer who stays with his wife Pushpa Pandey and son. Despite being a lawyer, he works as a menial assistant to one of the most famous lawyers of Lucknow, Mr. Rizvi, for whom his father had worked as an assistant for 30 years. He is street smart and dreams of his own law chamber.

Seeking to arrange money for his own chamber, Jolly lies to a widow, Hina Qasim, telling her that Mr. Rizvi will take her case and that the fee is 200,000 rupees. When Hina finds out that Jolly lied to her, she commits suicide. Jolly soon discovers that Hina's husband, Iqbal Qasim, was killed in a fake encounter on 13 August 2015, the very next day of their marriage, by Inspector Suryaveer Singh, who depicted him as Mohammed Iqbal Quadri, a terrorist, in official documents. Singh also shot a fellow constable, Baldev Singh Bhadauria, in order to show the encounter as genuine, leading to his death.

Filled with guilt, Jolly decides to fight Hina's case and files a PIL. Singh then hires Lucknow's best lawyer, Pramod Mathur, to fight his case. After reprimanding Jolly for his mistakes in filing the PIL and no credible evidence, Justice Sunderlal Tripathi gives a date for hearing and warns Jolly to collect some evidence before the hearing.

Jolly is able to get a copy of the FIR and other papers regarding the case with the help of a bookie, Guru Ji, in Varanasi by paying him a sum of ₹500,000 by selling his own chamber. Later, he is able to track Ram Kumar Bhadauria, the son of the constable who died in the fake encounter. This backfires as Mathur uses his power and money to tamper with the narco test video of the witness. However, even though Justice Tripathi orders disciplinary action against Jolly for showing allegedly dishonest evidence, the Chairman of the Disciplinary Committee, who turns out to be Mr. Rizvi himself, gives Jolly four days of time to prove his worth, as he feels guilty for not fighting the case in good stead.

Jolly and Pushpa, while analyzing Hina and Iqbal Qasim's wedding album, notice an unknown cop from Kashmir called Fahim Bhat. Jolly travels to Kashmir and gets confirmation of the truth from Fahim, who visited Lucknow to identify the terrorist during Iqbal Qasim and Hina's wedding. Fahim, now suspended and arrested in a fake case, reveals that Qasim, who died in the encounter, was not the real terrorist and that he also filed a complaint against Singh. Jolly flees with Fahim to Lucknow. Meanwhile, Jolly coaxes the police commissioner, V.K. Paul, to tell the truth, or else he will file a PIL against all the encounters done by him. Mathur tries his best to avoid Fahim from giving a statement in the court as he stops the proceedings in the courtroom by sitting on the floor in protest. Justice Tripathi also sits on the floor, refusing to be swayed by Mathur's tactics.

At midnight, Justice Tripathi ignores Mathur's plea and decides to carry on the proceedings. After Fahim's statement, Jolly, with help from Paul, presents Quadri, who fakes his identity as a Brahmin Pandit. After initial reluctance from Justice Tripathi, Jolly rapidly fires questions to Iqbal by asking him details of the Shastras. Iqbal finally admits that he is the terrorist, Quadri, and had bribed Singh to set him free. Justice Tripathi then declares Qasim innocent and orders release of Ram Kumar Bhadauria, and Quadri's arrest, giving life imprisonment to Singh along with his accomplices on charges of murder, erasing evidence, misleading the court, and showing false evidence as Jolly wins the case.

== Cast ==
- Akshay Kumar as Advocate Jagdishwar "Jolly" Mishra
- Huma Qureshi as Pushpa Pandey, Jolly's wife
- Saurabh Shukla as Judge Sunderlal Tripathi, a judge transferred from Delhi High Court, who knows another person with the same name as Jolly (Arshad Warsi); Shukla reprises his role from Jolly LLB
- Annu Kapoor as Advocate Pramod Mathur
- Ram Gopal Bajaj as Mr. Rizvi, Jolly's boss and senior advocate
- Kumud Mishra as Inspector Suryaveer Singh
- Sayani Gupta as Hina Qasim née Siddiqui, Iqbal's lover and later wife
- Manav Kaul as Iqbal Qasim
- Inaamulhaq as Mohammed Iqbal Quadri, who masquerades as Pandit Ramkrishan Premkrishan Saraswat in court
- Sitaram Panchal as Sitaram, the farmer
- Sanjay Mishra as Guru Ji: a former police constable in Delhi Police who arranges evidences for lawyers including Jolly from Delhi and Jolly from Lucknow; Mishra reprises his role from Jolly LLB
- Brijendra Kala as Shiv Kumar Dubey, the man who arranges a chamber for Jolly
- V.M. Badola as Mr. Mishra, Jolly's father
- Rajiv Gupta as Birbal, Jolly's assistant
- Vinod Nagpal as Zahoor Siddiqui, Hina's father
- Avijit Dutt as Commissioner V.K. Paul
- Brijesh Sharma as CBI Officer Nair
- Sudhanva Deshpande as CBI Officer Basu
- Sunil Kumar Palwal as Fahim Bhat, a Kashmir Police Constable
- Saurabh Agnihotri as Gul Mohammad
- Saran Tiwari as Tripathi's nephew
- Shubhangi Latkar as Dr. Hema Deshpande, the narco specialist
- Zia Ahmed as Reporter
- Tarun Kumar as Baldev Singh Bhadaria
- Dadhi Pandey as Siraj Alam
- Sushil Pandey as Ram Kumar Bhadauria
- A.R. Rama as Mushtaq, Mathur's assistant
- Yakub Sayed as Jugal Kishore Mathur, Mathur's father
- Gurpal Singh as Judge Harbhajan Singh
- Rati Shankar Tripathi as Chacha in the opening mass cheating scene
- Mir Sarwar as Kashmir Police Inspector Hidayat Baig
- Ajay Singh as Rizvi's assistant

== Production ==
=== Casting ===
The film was announced in July 2016, where the lead actor Akshay Kumar had revealed his first look for the film. It was reported that Arshad Warsi, who played the lead role in the previous installment, was replaced by Kumar. Actress Huma Qureshi was signed as the female lead, pairing opposite Kumar. Annu Kapoor was signed as the antagonist of the film pitted against Kumar.

=== Development ===
Principal photography of the film began in Mumbai. The major parts of the film were shot in Lucknow in a one-month schedule. It was further reported that the first schedule was completed in September 2016. The second schedule was shot in Varanasi in later September 2016. A stunt sequence was shot in the Ganga river, where Kumar declined to use a stunt double. The final schedule of the film was shot in Manali, Himachal Pradesh in October 2016. Kumar shot his scenes in a time span of 30 days. A promotional song was shot in Mumbai in December 2016.

== Controversies ==
=== Depiction of Indian judicial system ===
The film's title and depiction of the Indian legal system created a controversy. Advocate Ajaykumar Waghmare filed a case at the Bombay High Court for removal of the word "LLB" and stated that the use of the word is a "deliberate attempt" to insult the Indian legal system. The Bombay High Court appointed a three-member committee to examine the content of the film. The Supreme Court of India also appointed a three-member panel, consisting of Chief Justice J. S. Khehar and Justices N. V. Ramana and D. Y. Chandrachud, to review the film.

=== Lawsuit from Bata ===
The film's trailer included a derogative reference to Bata Shoes, a shoe brand. The firm Kochhar & Co, on behalf of Bata India, issued a legal notice to the filmmakers for the comment and filed a lawsuit of ₹30 million (US$320,000). The CBFC edited out the reference to the brand with respect to the filed lawsuit.

=== Ban ===
The film is banned in Pakistan. The Central Board of Film Censors of Pakistan objected to some scenes related to terrorism issues in Indian Jammu and Kashmir.

== Release ==
The film was released on 10 February 2017. Prior to its release, the CBFC passed the film without any cuts.

== Soundtrack ==
Jolly LLB 2

Soundtrack album by: Manj Musik; Meet Bros; Vishal Khurana; Chirantan Bhatt
- Released: 13 January 2017
- Recorded: 2014–2015
- Genre: Feature film soundtrack
- Length: 15:11
- Language: Hindi
- Label: T-Series
- Director: Subhash Kapoor
- Producer: Subhash Kapoor

The music for the film was composed by Manj Musik, Meet Bros, Vishal Khurana and Chirantan Bhatt, while the lyrics were written by Shabbir Ahmed, Junaid Wasi, Manj Musik and Raftaar. The song "Jolly Good Fellow" incorporates lyrics from the English folk song "For He's a Jolly Good Fellow". The full movie soundtrack was released on 13 January 2017. It consists of four songs, including one Qawaali song. The music rights were acquired by T-Series.

Track listing
No.	Title	Lyrics	Music	Singer(s)	Length
1.	"Go Pagal"	Manj Musik, Raftaar	Manj Musik, Nilesh Patel	Raftaar, Nindy Kaur	2:52
2.	"Bawara Mann"	Junaid Wasi	Chirantan Bhatt	Jubin Nautiyal, Neeti Mohan	3:36
3.	"Jolly Good Fellow"	Shabbir Ahmed	Meet Bros	Raam Kapoor, Earl Edgar	3:52
4.	"O Re Rangreza (Qawaali)"	Junaid Wasi	Vishal Khurana	Sukhwinder Singh, Murtuza Mustafa & Qadir Mustafa	4:52
Total length:					15:11

== Box office ==
=== Domestic ===
The film opened with a domestic collection of ₹132.0 million, becoming Akshay Kumar's eighth highest opener and second highest of the year, following Raees. The film showed growth in the next two days, collecting ₹17.31 crores and ₹19.95 crores on the second and third day of release respectively. Its first domestic weekend collection was ₹504.6 million. It became the second highest first weekend collecting Bollywood film of the year, after Raees. Its cumulative collection in the next four days was ₹26.25 crores. The film scored ₹777.1 million in its first domestic week. After Raees, Jolly LLB 2 is the second highest domestic first week collecting film of 2017. As of 2 March, the film had collected ₹ 1172.4 million domestically.

=== Overseas ===
During its first week, the film collected ₹49.6 million (US$530,000) from North America (United States and Canada), ₹10.4 million (US$110,000) from United Kingdom, ₹58.6 million (US$630,000) from United Arab Emirates, ₹100,000 (US$1,100) from Malaysia, ₹10.6 million (US$110,000) from Australia and ₹4.4 million (US$47,000) from New Zealand. It collected ₹134.0 million from overseas during its first week, which was the second highest for a Bollywood film of 2017.

== Awards and nominations ==
Date of ceremony	Award	Category	Recipient(s) and nominee(s)	Result	Ref.
2 December 2017	Star Screen Awards	Best Film	The State vs Jolly LL.B 2	Nominated	
2 December 2017	Star Screen Awards	Best Actor – Male (Popular)	Akshay Kumar	Nominated	
30 December 2017	Zee Cine Awards	Best Film (Viewer's Choice)	The State vs Jolly LL.B 2	Nominated	
30 December 2017	Zee Cine Awards	Best Actor – Male (Viewer's Choice)	Akshay Kumar	Won	
30 December 2017	Zee Cine Awards	Best Director	Subhash Kapoor	Nominated	
30 December 2017	Zee Cine Awards	Best Writing	Subhash Kapoor	Nominated	
30 December 2017	Zee Cine Awards	Best Actor in a Negative Role	Annu Kapoor	Nominated	
20 January 2018	Filmfare Awards	Best Screenplay	Subhash Kapoor	Nominated	
20 January 2018	Filmfare Awards	Best Dialogue	Subhash Kapoor	Nominated	

== Sequel ==
After the success of the second installment, makers confirmed that they would make a third part of this franchise. The film is titled Jolly LLB 3, with both Akshay Kumar and Arshad Warsi reprising their roles of Jolly along with Shukla reprising his role. The film also stars Amrita Rao and Huma Qureshi, reprising their roles from the first two installments. Jolly LLB 3 was released in Indian cinema after eight years on September 19, 2025.
