= Jolly LLB =

2013 Indian film by Subhash Kapoor

- Theatrical release poster
- Directed by: Subhash Kapoor
- Written by: Subhash Kapoor
- Produced by: Fox Star Studios
- Starring: Arshad Warsi; Boman Irani; Amrita Rao; Saurabh Shukla
- Cinematography: Anshuman Mahaley
- Edited by: Sandeep Singh Bajeli
- Music by: Songs: Krsna Solo; Background Score: Sanjoy Chowdhury
- Production company: Fox Star Studios
- Distributed by: Fox Star Studios
- Release date: 15 March 2013
- Running time: 128 minutes
- Country: India
- Language: Hindi
- Budget: ₹10 crore
- Box office: est.₹48.7 crore

Jolly LLB is a 2013 Indian Hindi-language legal comedy drama film written and directed by Subhash Kapoor and produced by Fox Star Studios. The film stars Arshad Warsi, Boman Irani, Amrita Rao, and Saurabh Shukla and revolves around the early life of Advocate Jagdish Tyagi, also known as Jolly, and focuses on his attempt to earn six innocent labourers their justice and his journey against the monopolistic behavior of the rich and judicial corruption. The storyline is inspired by the 1999 hit-and-run case of Sanjeev Nanda and a minor reference to the Priyadarshini Mattoo case.

The film was released on 15 March 2013 and received positive reviews from critics and was a commercial success at the box-office.

== Plot ==
In 2011, Advocate Jagdish "Jolly" Tyagi is a Delhi-based lawyer living with his sister's husband, Pratap, and is in a relationship with Sandhya. He happens to witness prominent criminal defense lawyer, Advocate Tejinder Rajpal, successfully defend Rahul Dewan, a boy from a high-society family in a sessions court, who has been accused of drunk driving in a Toyota Land Cruiser Prado and causing the deaths of six labourers sleeping on the footpath six months ago. Jolly, desperate for money and fame, decides to pursue the case and files a PIL in the court against Rahul Dewan. Jolly's neighbour, Kaul Saab gifts him his office as a chamber, because Kaul Saab's daughter was raped and murdered by a policeman's son, who was also successfully defended by Rajpal. Kaul Saab takes this to be an opportunity to receive some justice through Jolly.

After initially reprimanding Jolly for his mistakes in filing the PIL and presenting the press reports as evidence, Judge Sunderlal Tripathi warns Jolly to collect some valid evidence before the next hearing. Jolly then runs into Albert Pinto, who claims to have witnessed the accident, but soon learns that he is a lackey of Rajpal and was being used to extract more money from the Dewan family. As part of the deal, Pinto gives Jolly a share of the money and turns hostile in court. However, Sandhya and Kaul Saab chide Jolly for compromising on justice for his greed, provoking him to return the money to Rajpal and challenge him to win the case.

With the help of Pratap, Jolly collects the video footage of the car involved in the accident and presents it to the court. Rajpal counters that the car was driven by the Dewan family's driver and the footage was fake. Jolly refutes it by successfully cross-examining the driver, who finally admits that he had registered a false testimony. Judge Tripathi then orders the police to provide a bodyguard for Jolly after he is manhandled by Rajpal's colleagues. Although Sub-Inspector Satbir Rathi, who is also on Rajpal's payroll, tries to sabotage him, Jolly, with the help of his bodyguard, Constable Haldiram, leaves for Gorakhpur after learning that Sadakant Mishra, a survivor of the accident, stays there.

Jolly, after passing through many hurdles, successfully brings Mishra to the court. Rajpal tries to scuttle proceedings but the hesitant Tripathi overrules him. Mishra reveals the truth of the accident; that night, he and his relatives were sleeping on the footpath when Rahul Dewan drove his Land Cruiser over them, except Mishra. When he saw Mishra witnessing what he did, Rahul Dewan backed his car, hoping to run over him, but instead ran over his leg, resulting in it being amputated. Mishra also states that Rathi had threatened him after the accident and fabricated the investigation, and that he was only allowed to go after he offered his hard-earned money and jewellery for his sister's marriage to Rathi. Mishra also identifies Rahul Dewan as the one who drove the car. After the emotional closing arguments by Rajpal and Jolly, Tripathi directs the police department to suspend Rathi and initiate a criminal inquiry against him, and also declares Rahul Dewan as guilty of the crime and sentences him to seven years of imprisonment. As Jolly walks out receiving praises, Rajpal sits crestfallen over losing a case for the first time.

== Cast ==
The film cast has been listed below:

- Arshad Warsi as Advocate Jagdish Tyagi (Jolly)
- Boman Irani as Advocate Tejinder Rajpal
- Amrita Rao as Sandhya
- Saurabh Shukla as Judge Sunderlal Tripathi
- Harsh Chhaya as Albert Pinto
- Manoj Pahwa as Pratap, Jolly's brother-in-law
- Ramesh Deo as Kaul Saab
- Mohan Kapoor as Yograj Dewan, Rahul Dewan's father
- Sanjay Mishra as Guruji
- Mohan Agashe as Senior Dewan, Rahul's grandfather
- Vibha Chibber as Meerut Judge
- Sushil Pandey as Sadakant Mishra
- Sandeep Bose as Sub-Inspector Satbir Rathi
- Rajeev Siddharth as Rahul Dewan
- Brijendra Kala as Suresh Vashishth
- Mukund Bhatt as Constable Haldiram
- Vijay Gupta as Ramakant Shukla
- Vishal O Sharma as Lawyer
- Ishtiyak Khan as Vasu, lawyer from Rohtak

== Release ==
=== Critical reception ===
Jolly LLB received positive reviews from critics. Taran Adarsh of Bollywood Hungama gave the film 3.5 stars and said "Jolly LLB is a power-packed courtroom drama. But, most importantly, it celebrates the spirit of the common man seeking justice and impartiality most effectively. Just don't miss this jolly good film!". The Times of India gave the film 3.5 stars and wrote "Jolly LLB works because of its bigger point - decency is for all and worth fighting for. Using bittersweet satire and plot twirls, the film shows corruption even used against the corrupt. Despite that weaker first half, this truly becomes a Jolly good show." Anupama Chopra of the Hindustan Times said parts of the film are "laugh-out-loud funny, but underneath the humour is an angry critique of the system, so easily manipulated by the rich and so difficult to penetrate for the poor."

== Music ==
Jolly LLB

Soundtrack album by Krsna
- Released: 22 February 2013
- Recorded: 2013
- Genre: Feature film soundtrack
- Length: 33:40
- Label: T-Series
- Producer: Krsna

Krsna chronology
Tanu Weds Manu (2011)	Jolly LLB (2013)	Tamanchey (2013)

The music of Jolly LLB was composed by Krsna. The lyrics were written by Subhash Kapoor and Vayu for "Jhooth Boliya". The first song promo, "Mere Toh L Lag Gaye" by Bappi Lahiri, which is set in raag Bhimpalasi, was released on 13 February 2013. In the soundtrack, the song has been cut into two different songs, one titled "Law Lag Gaye" while the other "L Lag Gaye". The second song promo, "Jhooth Boliya" by Kamal Khan was released on 15 February 2013. The full soundtrack was released on 22 February 2013 under the label T-Series. It consists of eight songs.

=== Track listing ===
No.	Title	Lyrics	Singer(s)	Length
1.	"Jhooth Boliya"	Vayu	Kamal Khan	4:08
2.	"Daru Peeke Nachna"	Subhash Kapoor	Mika Singh, Shreya Ghoshal	4:17
3.	"Ajnabi"	Subhash Kapoor	Mohit Chauhan, Shreya Ghoshal	3:55
4.	"Hans Ki Chaal"	Subhash Kapoor	Kailash Kher	4:22
5.	"Mere Toh Law Lag Gaye"	Subhash Kapoor	Bappi Lahiri	4:31
6.	"Jhooth Boliya" (remix)	Vayu	Kamal Khan	3:59
7.	"Daru Peeke Nachna" (remix)	Subhash Kapoor	Mika Singh	3:48
8.	"Mere Toh L Lag Gaye"	Subhash Kapoor	Bappi Lahiri	4:30

== Awards ==
==== 61st National Film Awards ====
- National Film Award for Best Feature Film in Hindi
- National Film Award for Best Supporting Actor: Saurabh Shukla

==== 2014 Screen Awards ====
- Screen Award for Best Supporting Actor: Saurabh Shukla

==== 59th Filmfare Awards ====
- Filmfare Award for Best Story
- Filmfare Award for Best Dialogue

== Sequels ==
A sequel, Jolly LLB 2 was released in February 2017, with Saurabh Shukla, Sanjay Mishra and Brijendra Kala reprising their roles and Akshay Kumar replacing Warsi as the lead.

In 2025, Jolly LLB 3 was released in which Kumar and Warsi, along with several other cast members from both the previous films, reprised their roles.

== Remakes ==
The film has been remade in Tamil as Manithan (2016) and Telugu as Sapthagiri LLB (2017).
