= Subhash Kapoor =

Indian filmmaker

- Born: New Delhi, India
- Occupations: Film director; screenwriter
- Years active: 2001–present

Subhash Kapoor is an Indian film director and screenwriter. He was a political journalist, who later became known for directing satirical comical dramas like Phas Gaye Re Obama (2010), Jolly LLB (2013) and Jolly LLB 2 (2017).

== Career ==
After completing his Master of Arts in Hindi Literature, Kapoor started his career as a political journalist in Delhi in the 1990s covering North India; thereafter, when his short film got him acclaim in 2001, he started making commercial short films, documentaries and ad films, eventually shifting base to Mumbai in 2006.

In 2007, Kapoor made his feature film directorial debut with Say Salaam India. The film failed at the box office even though it received positive reviews from the critics. In 2010, he directed his second venture, a satire Phas Gaye Re Obama, which featured many comedians. The film managed to do well in India, and received critical acclaim as well as commercial success. Due to the surprise success of the film, Kapoor began writing his next project. In 2013, Kapoor released Jolly LLB, featuring Arshad Warsi, Amrita Rao and Boman Irani, which was a courtroom drama with a comical touch. The film was released on 15 March 2013.

He also directed its sequel, Jolly LLB 2, which starred Akshay Kumar, Huma Qureshi, Annu Kapoor and Saurabh Shukla in pivotal roles. Upon its release on 10 February 2017, the film received critical acclaim with the box office collections exceeding over 200 crores worldwide. He created the highly acclaimed political drama, Maharani, for SonyLIV with Huma Qureshi in the main lead. The first season was released during the COVID lockdown on 28 May 2021 and went on to creating a benchmark for OTT shows. Subsequently, Season 2 and 3 were also loved by the audiences making it one of the top shows of the country. The much awaited sequel of Jolly LLB 2, Jolly LLB 3 released on 19th September 2025 to critical acclaim and box office success. It featured both Arshad Warsi and Akshay Kumar along with Saurabh Shukla, Gajraj Rao and Seema Biswas. With Jolly LLB 3, Jolly LLB became one of the most successful franchise of Bollywood..

== Filmography ==
Key
†	Denotes films that have not yet been released

=== Films ===
Year	Title	Director	Writer	Notes
2007	Say Salaam India	Yes	Yes	
2010	Phas Gaye Re Obama	Yes	Yes	
2013	Jolly LLB	Yes	Yes	
2015	Guddu Rangeela	Yes	Yes	
2017	Jolly LLB 2	Yes	Yes	
2021	Madam Chief Minister	Yes	Yes	
2025	Jolly LLB 3	Yes	Yes	

=== Web series ===
Year	Title	Creator	Writer	Notes
2021-2025	Maharani	Yes	Yes	4 seasons
