= Amrita Rao =

Indian actress (born 1981)

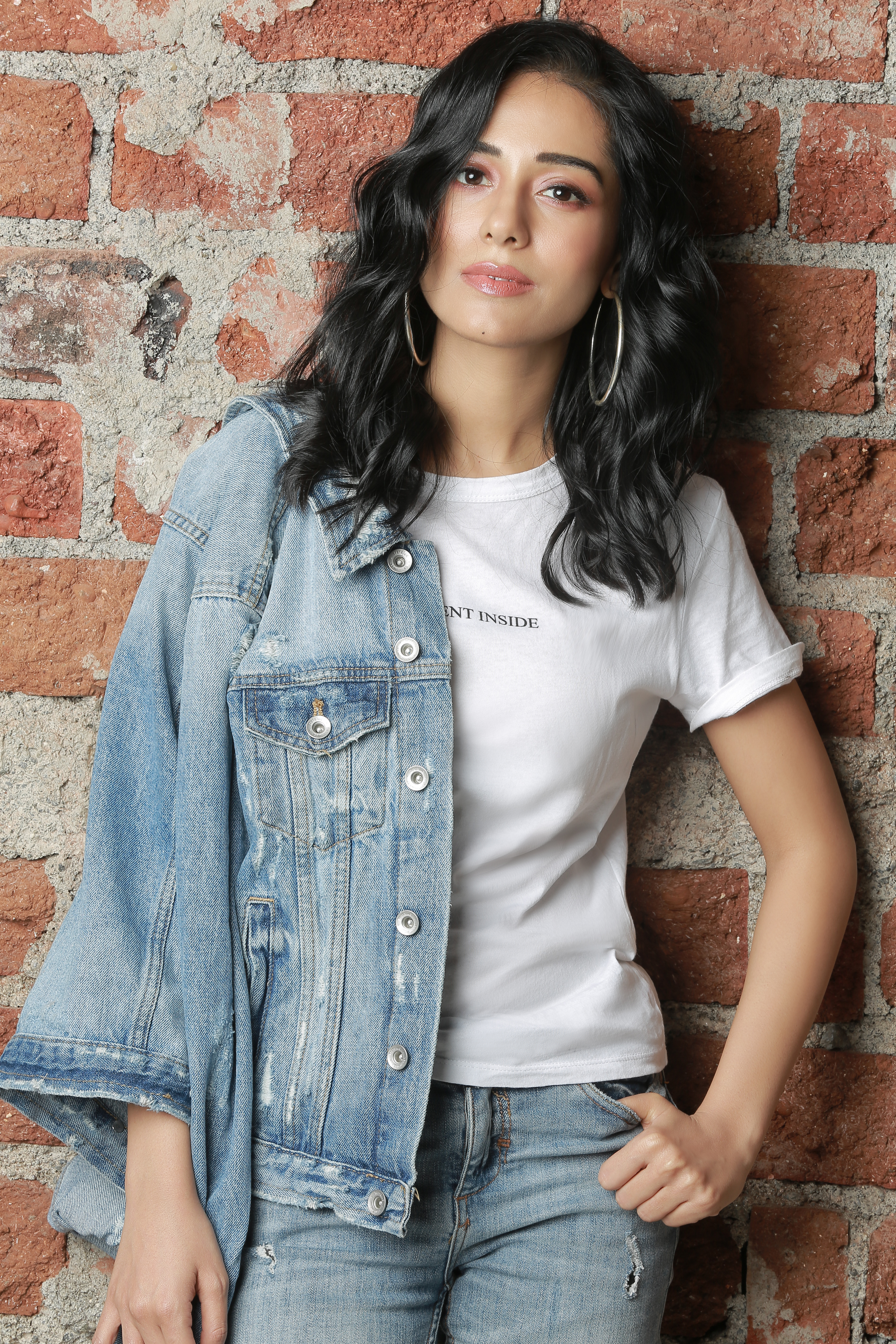
- Rao in 2020
- Born: 7 June 1981 (age 45); Bombay, Maharashtra, India
- Education: Sophia College for Women
- Occupation: Actress
- Years active: 2002–present
- Spouse: Anmol Sood (m. 2016)
- Children: 1
- Relatives: Preetika Rao (sister)

Amrita Rao (born 7 June 1981) is an Indian actress who primarily works in Hindi films. Known for her quintessential girl-next-door portrayals, Rao is the recipient of several accolades including an IIFA Award and two Stardust Awards, along with nominations for two Filmfare Awards.

Rao made her acting debut with Ab Ke Baras (2002), which earned her a nomination for Filmfare Award for Best Female Debut. Rao won the IIFA Award for Star Debut of the Year – Female for her portrayal of a college student in the romantic drama Ishq Vishk (2003), her first commercial success. She had further success in the masala action comedy Main Hoon Na (2004), the romantic drama Vivah (2006), the comedy Masti (2004) and the satire Welcome to Sajjanpur (2008), winning the Stardust Award for Best Actress for her performance in the lattermost. Following a career downturn, Rao achieved box office success with legal comedy Jolly LLB (2013). She also began playing supporting parts with the action drama Singh Saab the Great (2013) and the political drama Satyagraha (2013). She expanded to television with the soap opera Meri Awaaz Hi Pehchaan Hai (2016), portraying a singer. Rao has since earned success with Jolly LLB 3 (2025).

Rao is married to RJ Anmol Sood with whom she has a son.

== Early life ==
Rao hails from a Konkani-speaking Chitrapur Saraswat Brahmin family. She studied at Canossa Girls School, Andheri and pursued a Bachelor of Psychology from Sophia College for Women, Mumbai but dropped out to pursue a modeling career. She has a younger sister Preetika Rao, who is also an actress.

== Career ==
=== Early work, breakthrough and success (2002–2006) ===
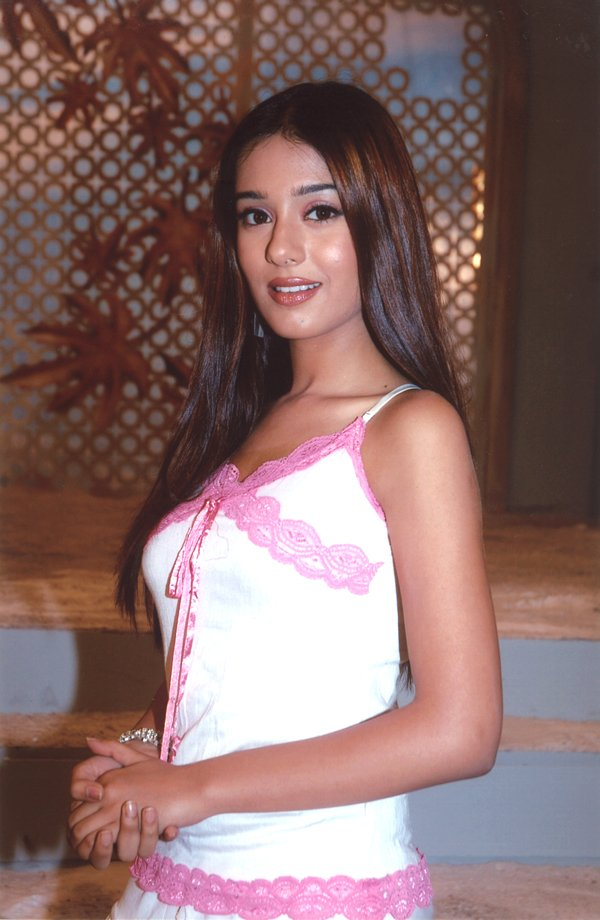
Rao at an event

Before starting her career as an actor, Rao along with her sister Preetika appeared in several commercials during her college days. Her first public appearance was in Alisha Chinai's song Woh Pyar Mera. In 2002, Rao played her first leading role as Anjali Thapar in Raj Kanwar's fantasy thriller Ab Ke Baras alongside debutante Aarya Babbar. The film, which depicts the story of U.S based girl (played by Rao) having recurrent dreams of a parallel life in India, proved to be financially unsuccessful; however, Rao received a nomination for the Filmfare Award for Best Female Debut for her performance. Rao next starred alongside Ajay Devgn in the biographical period film The Legend of Bhagat Singh. In the film, which narrates the story of Indian independence Freedom Fighter Bhagat Singh, she played the role of Mannewali (Bhagat's fiancé). The film did not perform well at the box office, grossing only ₹129 million (US$2.7 million in 2002).

Rao starred in the coming-of-age romance film Ishq Vishk (2003), opposite Shahid Kapoor, in their first of several collaborations. She played a college student who is in love with her childhood friend. The film was a success at the box office proving to be a breakthrough for Rao. Both the film and Rao's performance received critical acclaim. Reviewing the film, Taran Adarsh noted, "Amrita is a revelation. Her emotional sequences are so powerful that they are bound to melt even the stone-hearted." Rao's portrayal earned her the IIFA Award for Star Debut of the Year – Female.

Rao had three film releases in 2004. Her first release of the year was Indra Kumar's adult comedy Masti, opposite Vivek Oberoi. The film featured an ensemble cast and earned around ₹34.14 crore (US$3.5 million) worldwide. The film received mixed reviews from critics and did well at the box office. Rao's performance as the over-possessive wife was well received by critics. Rao next had a supporting role in the Farah Khan's masala film Main Hoon Na, where she co-starred alongside Shah Rukh Khan and Zayed Khan. The film emerged as the second highest-grossing Indian film of the year with over ₹84 crore (US$8.7 million) in revenue worldwide. Her role as an army officer's daughter Sanjana, received positive reviews and Siddharth Patankar of NDTV called her "Bollywood’s little powerhouse" noting that she was "as convincing as ever". The film earned her a nomination for the Filmfare Award for Best Supporting Actress. Her third and final release of the year was Milan Luthria's action drama Deewar. Rao had a minor role named Radhika and played Akshaye Khanna's love interest.

Rao co-starred in the 2005 drama Vaah! Life Ho Toh Aisi! alongside Shahid Kapoor. Critical response to the film was negative, although Rao garnered acclaim for her performance as a school teacher. That same year, Rao took the lead role in the John Matthew Matthan drama Shikhar, in which she portrayed Madhvi and reunited with Shahid Kapoor for the same. She then appeared in the 2006 comedy Pyare Mohan, a film loosely based on the 1989 American film See No Evil, Hear No Evil, and her second collaboration with Vivek Oberoi. The movie received mixed reviews from critics and failed at the box office. All of Rao's releases that year failed commercially, and Rajeev Masand stated, "Amrita hit career lows, producing the low-fashion chemistry".

Rao then had a resurgence in 2006, when she played the lead in Sooraj R. Barjatya's romance Vivah. The film depicted the journey of two individuals in an arrange marriage. In her fourth collaboration with Shahid Kapoor, Rao portrayed Poonam, a traditionally raised young woman. The film received mixed reviews by critics but became the tenth highest-grossing film of the year, as well as Rao's biggest commercial success to date. Taran Adarsh wrote, "Amrita gets a new lease of life with Vivah. She looks the character and is splendid all through." Rao received a nomination for the Screen Award for Best Actress for her performance in the film.

=== Occasional success and career setback (2007–2016) ===
Rao was cast alongside Mahesh Babu in the 2007 Telugu action film Athidhi. The film was directed and co-written by Surender Reddy. She received mostly positive reviews, with critics praising the chemistry between Rao and Babu. Radhika Rajamani for Rediff.com stated, "Amrita, who makes her debut in Telugu films, makes a mark." A critic of Sify noted, "Amrita has proved that she could be yet another native girl of Tollywood. She emoted well with convincing histrionics fit for the Telugu screen."

Rao had two major releases in 2008: drama My Name Is Anthony Gonsalves opposite newcomer Nikhil Dwivedi, and Shyam Benegal's comedy film Welcome to Sajjanpur. My Name Is Anthony Gonsalves received overwhelmingly negative reviews and performed poorly at the box office. Rao's performance as an orphan who lives a middle-class lifestyle was praised by a few critics; OneIndia Entertainment noted, "Amrita Rao looks gorgeous, but her role isn't substantial enough." In Welcome to Sajjanpur, Rao played the role of Kamala, a woman who is desperate for communication from her husband Bansiram (Kunal Kapoor), a laborer at a dockyard in Mumbai. Successful in creating an impact at the box office, the film obtained positive reviews from critics and earned ₹20 million (US$210,000), making it the second-highest-grossing film in Rao's career. Hindustan Times noted, "Amrita Rao is sweetness personified." She received the Stardust Award for Best Actress for her performance in the film. In the same year, Rao made a guest appearance as Nirja Rathore in the courtroom drama Shaurya.

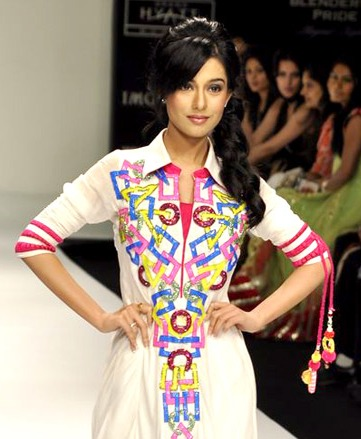
Rao walking the ramp for Archana Kochar at Lakme Fashion Week 2012

Rao made her debut as a judge with the 2009 television show Perfect Bride. She judged the show alongside Shekhar Suman and Malaika Arora. She next starred with Harman Baweja in the 2009 film Victory. The film faced competition from other films such as Raaz 2 and Dev.D and failed to do well. With a huge budget, it only managed to gross ₹1 crore (US$100,000) and was declared a disaster by Box Office India. That same year, Rao took on the lead role in Neeraj Vora's comedy-drama Short Kut: The Con is On opposite Akshaye Khanna, produced by Anil Kapoor. The film stars Rao as Mansi, the girlfriend of Akshaye's character. Critical response towards the film and Rao's performance received negative reviews, with The Indian Express's Shubhra Gupta noted: "Everything is loud and plastic, and the actors all chant their lines at the top of their voices." Gaurav Malini of The Times of India stated, "Amrita Rao tries too hard to look hot but lacks oomph in every possible angle". Though having grossed its budget back, it was considered a financial disappointment.

Rao's only film of 2011 was Love U...Mr. Kalakaar! and her second collaboration with Rajshri Productions. The movie generated mostly negative reviews and emerged as a commercial failure. Though, her performance as the daughter of a businessman was praised by the critics. Nikhat Kazmi of The Times of India wrote, "Amrita Rao at best, but the film is so predictable and so long, it loses impact". In later years, Rao made special appearances in comedy-drama Heyy Babyy (2007), romantic-comedy Life Partner (2007), and science fiction romance Jaane Kahan Se Aayi Hai (2010).

2013 saw Rao in three films; she first then starred in the courtroom, comedy-drama Jolly LLB. She played the lead role of Sandhya, the girlfriend of Arshad Warsi's character. The film received positive reviews and won the National Film Award for Best Feature Film in Hindi. Rao with limited performance in the film received average applause. Mohar Basu commented, "Amrita could have been avoided in the film altogether. Though she is immensely pleasant, she and her role have nothing to contribute to the film". Commercially, the film became a box office success. Anil Sharma's action drama Singh Saab the Great was her next release. Co-starring alongside Sunny Deol, Rao played a journalist Shikha Chaturvedi. The film was largely panned by critics but Rao's performance earned positive reviews. Namrata Joshi of Outlook stated, "Amrita plays a role that feels like something she has already done, all the emotional support". The film became a moderate success at the box office with revenues of ₹29 crore (US$3.0 million). Later that year, she appeared in Prakash Jha's political drama Satyagraha. Rao played the role of Sumitra, the daughter-in-law of Amitabh Bachchan's character. Rao was praised in particular; Resham Sengar of Zee News wrote, "Amrita has the sweetly cherubic looks. She is convincing in most of the emotional scenes. But again, her scope of performance is just limited to mouthing a few important dialogues." The film was poorly received by critics and failed to make a profit at the box office. Despite having moderate reviews, the film grossed over ₹60 crore (US$6.2 million) at the domestic box office.

With no release for two years, Rao made her television debut in 2016 with &TV's Meri Awaaz Hi Pehchaan Hai portraying the elder sister Kalyani Gaikwad. The story showed three generations of two sisters whose lives revolve around music. Her character's older version was played by Deepti Naval. This was followed by a three year hiatus.

=== Intermittent work (2019–present) ===
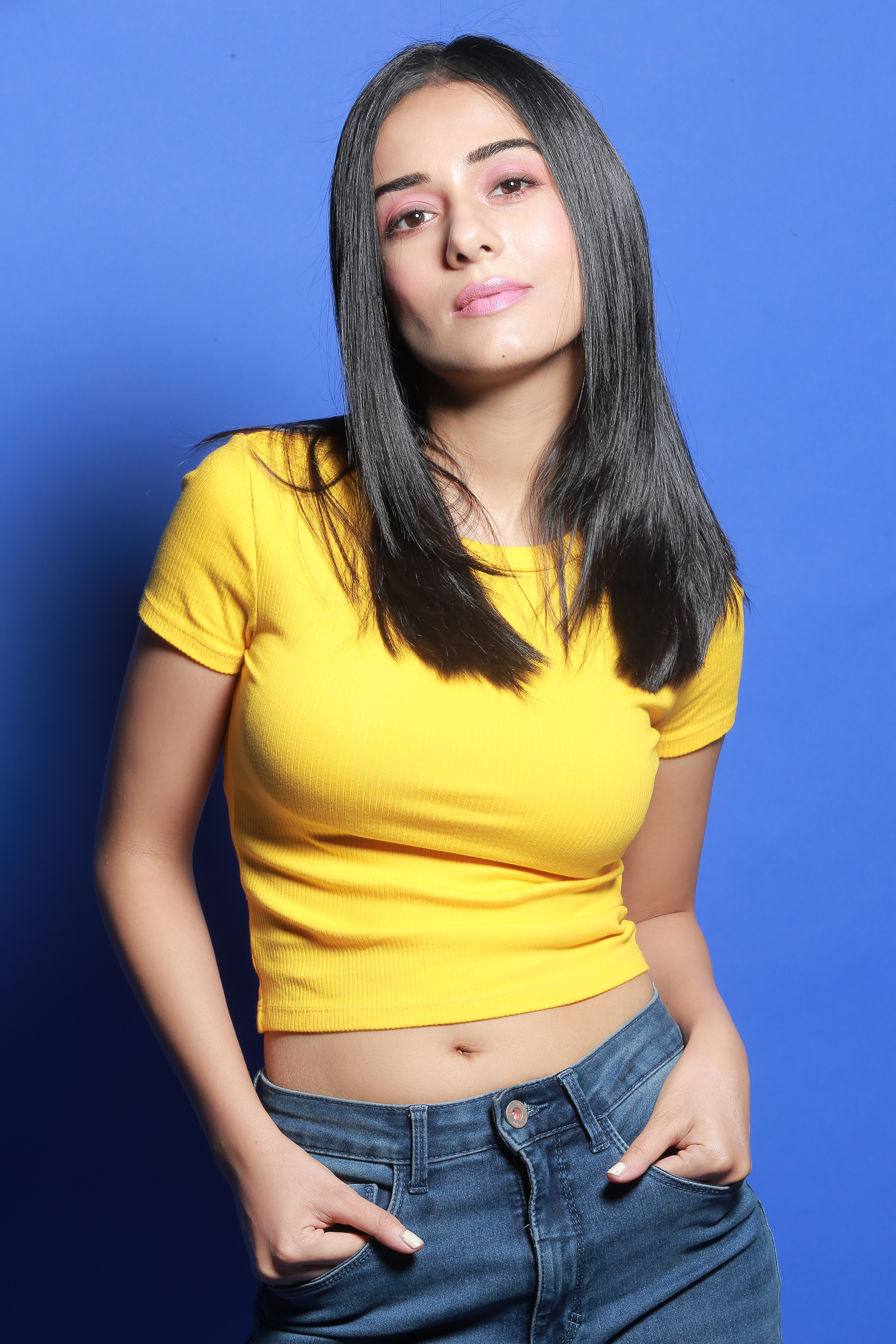
Rao in 2020

After a five-year absence from the screen, Rao played a leading role in Abhijit Panse's 2019 film Thackeray, a biopic based on a right-wing pro-Marathi politician Balasaheb Thackeray. Rao played the role of Meena Thackeray. The film as well as Rao received mixed to negative reviews from critics. Shilpa Jamkhandikar of Reuters wrote, "Amrita, who plays Thackeray's wife, has the cosmetic role of providing endless cups of tea to visitors and gaze at her husband dotingly". The film underperformed commercially.

In 2025, Rao reprised her role as Sandhya in Jolly LLB 3 opposite Arshad Warsi. The film marked her return to films after a six year hiatus. The film received generally positive reviews from critics. Chirag Sehgal of News18 noted, "Amrita get little screentime but play her parts with dedication." The film emerged as a commercial success at the box office.

== Personal life ==
After seven years of dating, Rao married her boyfriend, Anmol Sood, a radio jockey, on 15 May 2016 in Mumbai. She gave birth to a boy, whom she named Veer, on 1 November 2020. In February 2023, the couple launched their book, Couple of Things, and they own a YouTube channel with the same name.

== In the media ==
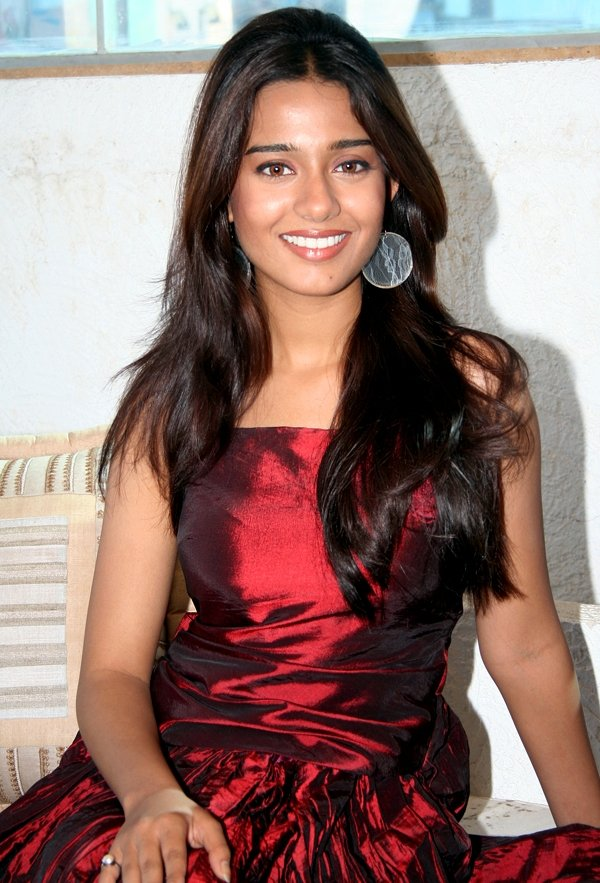
Rao promoting her film My Name Is Anthony Gonsalves

Rao has been part of many successful films and is often cited by the media as Bollywood's "quintessential girl-next-door". Kalwyna Rathod of Femina termed Rao a "darling of the audience". In the Times Most Desirable Women list, Rao has been placed 24th in 2009, 16th in 2010 and 23rd in 2011. Femina further placed her in its "50 Most Beautiful Women" list.

Vivah is termed as a significant success in Rao's career and is noted among her best roles. Bollywood Hungama placed her and Shahid Kapoor in its list of the top 10 best romantic couples of the decade. M. F. Husain pronounced Rao as his second muse, 11 years after he painted Madhuri Dixit and made several paintings dedicated to the actress's role in Vivah (2006). On her career, Rao said, "I have done some unforgettable films that I believe will hold relevance for a very long time. Perhaps many newcomers today haven't even seen the back-to-back success that I have seen right from the start of my career. My journey has been easy, yet difficult, because I had to carve my own path by trial and error. But the taste of being self-made is the sweetest." In 2023, Rao turned author, and published her memoir Couple of Things, along with her husband.

== Filmography ==
=== Films ===
Year	Title	Role	Notes	Ref.
2002	Ab Ke Baras	Anjali Thapar / Nandini (Note: Rao played dual roles in the film)		
2002	The Legend of Bhagat Singh	Mannewali		
2003	Ishq Vishk	Payal Mehra	credited as Amrita	
2004	Masti	Aanchal Mehta		
2004	Main Hoon Na	Sanjana "Sanju" Bakshi		
2004	Deewaar: Let's Bring Our Heroes Home	Radhika Saluja		
2005	Vaah! Life Ho Toh Aisi!	Piya		
2005	Shikhar	Madhavi		
2006	Pyare Mohan	Priya Sharma		
2006	Vivah	Poonam "Bitto" Mishra Bajpayee		
2007	Heyy Babyy	Herself	Special appearance in song "Heyy Babyy"	
2007	Athidhi	Amrita	Telugu film	
2008	My Name is Anthony Gonsalves	Riya Singh		
2008	Shaurya	Neerja Rathore		
2008	Welcome to Sajjanpur	Kamla Kumbharan		
2009	Victory	Nandini "Nandu"		
2009	Short Kut	Mansi		
2009	Life Partner	Anjali Kumar Oberoi	Cameo appearance	
2010	Jaane Kahan Se Aayi Hai	Tia	Cameo appearance	
2011	Love U...Mr. Kalakaar!	Ritu		
2013	Jolly LLB	Sandhya		
2013	Singh Saab the Great	Shikha Chaturvedi		
2013	Satyagraha	Sumitra Anand		
2014	Sulemani Keeda	Herself	Special appearance	
2019	Thackeray	Meena Thackeray		
2025	Jolly LLB 3	Sandhya "Sandhu" Tyagi		

=== Television ===
Year	Title	Role	Notes	Ref.
2009	Perfect Bride	Judge		
2016	Meri Awaaz Hi Pehchaan Hai	Kalyani Gaikwad		

=== Music videos ===
Year	Title	Singer(s)	Ref.
2001	"Woh Pyar Mera"	Alisha Chinoy	
2008	"Chalte Chalte Phir"	Jal Band	

== Awards and nominations ==
Year	Award	Category	Work	Result	Ref.
2003	Filmfare Awards	Best Female Debut	Ab Ke Baras	Nominated	
2003	Zee Cine Awards	Best Female Debut	Ab Ke Baras	Nominated	
2003	Screen Awards	Most Promising Newcomer – Female	Ab Ke Baras	Nominated	
2003	Sansui Viewers' Choice Movie Awards	Most Promising Debut Actress	Ab Ke Baras & The Legend of Bhagat Singh	Nominated	
2004	International Indian Film Academy Awards	Fresh Face of the Year	—N/a	Won	
2004	International Indian Film Academy Awards	Star Debut of the Year – Female	Ishq Vishk	Won	
2004	Stardust Awards	Superstar of Tomorrow – Female	Ishq Vishk	Won	
2005	Filmfare Awards	Best Supporting Actress	Main Hoon Na	Nominated	
2005	Bollywood Movie Awards	Best Supporting Actress	Main Hoon Na	Nominated	
2005	People's Choice Awards India	Best Supporting Actress	Main Hoon Na	Nominated	
2006	Gr8! Women Achievers Award	Young Achiever	—N/a	Won	
2007	Screen Awards	Best Actress	Vivah	Nominated	
2007	Anandalok Puraskar	Most Promising Actress	Vivah	Won	
2009	Stardust Awards	Best Actress	Welcome to Sajjanpur	Won	
