= Satyajeet Dubey filmography =

Wikimedia List article

== Filmography ==
=== Films ===
Year	Title	Role(s)	Language	Notes	References
2011	Always Kabhi Kabhi	Tariq Naqvi	Hindi	Feature film debut	
2012	Luck Luck Ki Baat	Amit Kumar	Hindi	Television film	
2015	Baankey Ki Crazy Baraat	Virat / Rajesh	Hindi		
2016	Kerry on Kutton	Kerry	Hindi		
2018	Harshit	Harshit	Hindi	Short film	
2019	Prassthanam	Vivaan Singh	Hindi		
2022	Aye Zindagi	Vinayak Chawla	Hindi		
2026	Simulacra	Nayan	Hindi		

=== Television and streaming ===
Year	Title	Role(s)	Platform / Network	Notes	References
2009	Jhansi Ki Rani	Nana Saheb	Zee TV		
2020	Maharaj Ki Jai Ho!	Sanjay Arora	StarPlus	50 episodes	
2021	Mumbai Diaries 26/11	Dr. Ahaan Mirza	Amazon Prime Video		
2022	Bestseller	Parth Acharya	Amazon Prime Video		
2023	Mumbai Diaries 26/11	Dr. Ahaan Mirza	Amazon Prime Video	Season 2	
2024	Ranneeti: Balakot & Beyond	Iqbal Dar	JioCinema		
2025	Pyaar Testing	Dhruv	ZEE5	Lead role	
2026	Ishqa Ishqa	Kabir	Amazon Prime Video	Lead role	
