= Dhruva Harsh =

Indian filmmaker

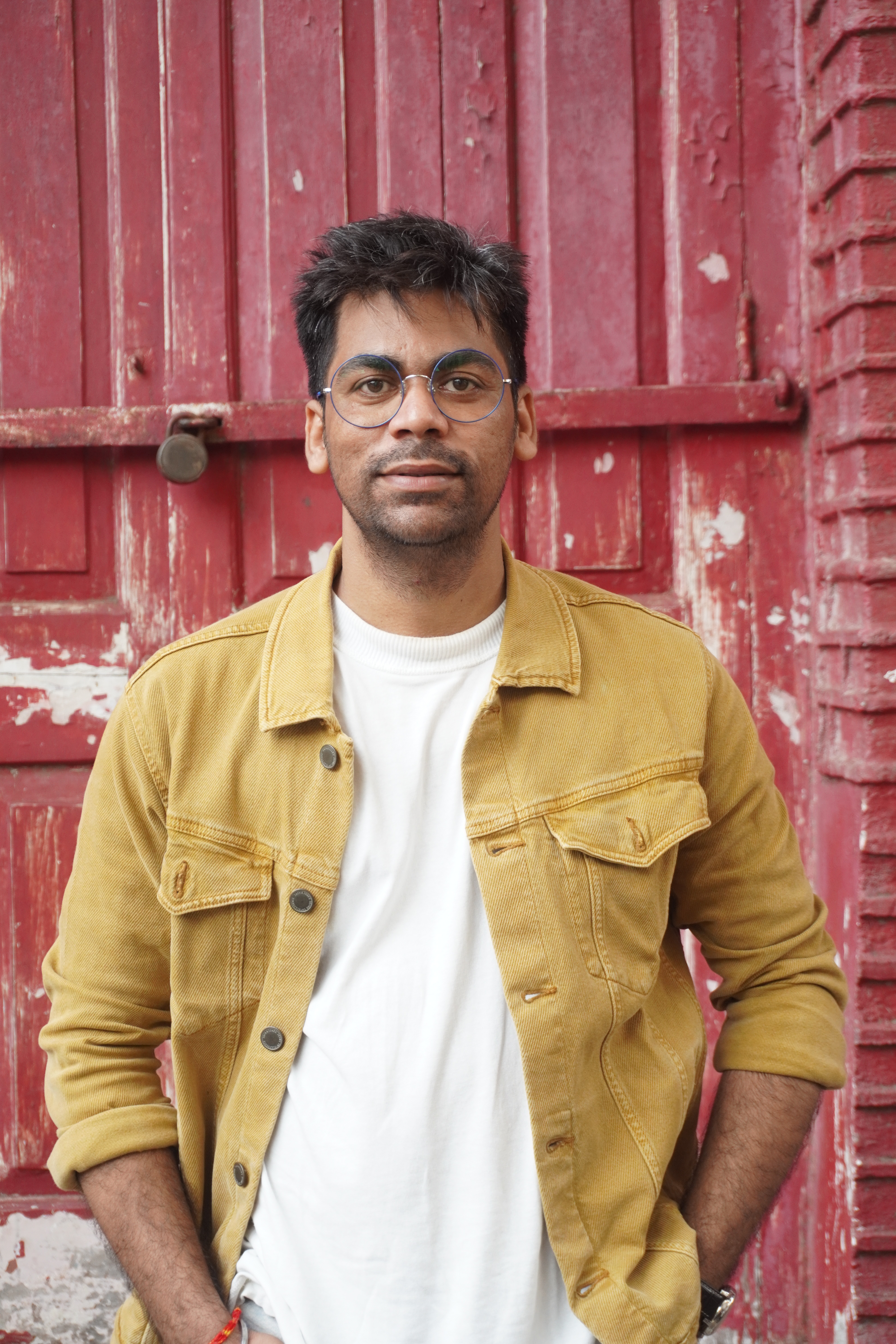
- Born: Dhruva Kumar Singh
- Education: University of Allahabad; Jawaharlal Nehru University
- Occupations: Film director Filmmaker; Writer
- Years active: 2015–present
- Notable work: Honourable Mention, Harshit, Do I Exist: A Riddle, The Last Sketch, Elham

Dhruva Harsh is an Indian film director, filmmaker and writer who is predominantly known for his work in Hindi cinema. He has directed numerous Hindi films, including Honourable Mention (2015), Harshit (2018), Do I Exist: A Riddle (2019), The Last Sketch (2020), and Elham (2023).

== Early life and education ==
He is originally from the Gonda district of Uttar Pradesh, India. Dhruva completed his master's degree, followed by a PhD in English in 2017 from the University of Allahabad. He is an alumnus of Ewing Christian College, Allahabad. He received training under theatre-makers Prof. Sachin Tewari and Pravin Shekhar. He pursues a post-doctorate at Jawaharlal Nehru University. He is the recipient of the ICSSR Doctoral Fellowship from the Indian Council of Social Science Research.

== Career ==
In 2015, he wrote and directed Honourable Mention, a film based on a short story from the collection Song Without End and Other Stories by Neelum Saran Gour. The film received positive acclaim, winning the Best Screenplay award at the Rolling Reels International Film Festival in Hyderabad.

In 2018, Dhruva Harsh wrote and directed the short film Harshit, starring Satyajeet Dubey, inspired by William Shakespeare's Hamlet. He later entered the OTT space with the release of his film Harshit on Amazon Prime in 2019 and Disney+ Hotstar in 2020. The film garnered selection in various film festivals and earned him the Best Director award at the International Short Film Festival in Pune.

A year later, in 2019, he directed the short film Do I Exist: A Riddle, which screened at the Pondicherry International Film Festival and the International Film Festival of Shimla. It was also an official selection at the 5th Panorama International Film Festival in Tunisia and the Jaipur International Film Festival. In 2020, he directed The Last Sketch, a feature documentary centered on hand-rickshaw pullers in Kolkata.

In 2023, he directed the feature film Elham, which was selected as the only children's film from India at the 24th Rainbow International Film Festival in London. The film also premiered at the 21st Dhaka International Film Festival in Bangladesh in January 2023. In February 2023, Dhruva Harsh directed and wrote his second feature film, Parable, based on Plato's allegory, exploring the academic world and its politics.

Before venturing into film direction, he authored plays, starting with his 2012 debut, The Burning Instinct, followed by Che – A Romantic Revolutionary in 2013 and Cigarette and Shakespeare in 2014. He also released a collection of Hindi poetry under the title Aye Zindagi Tu Ret To Nahi.

== Filmography ==
Year	Title	Director	Writer	Producer	Notes
2015	Honourable Mention	Yes	Yes		Director debut
2018	Harshit	Yes		Yes	
2019	Do I Exist: A Riddle	Yes	Yes		
2020	The Last Sketch	Yes	Yes		
2023	Elham	Yes	Yes		
2023	Parable	Yes	Yes		

== Controversies ==
In September 2019, Dhruva Harsh declined to accept his PhD degree and boycotted the convocation ceremony of Allahabad University in protest against Nobel laureate Kailash Satyarthi, the chief guest, alleging selective degree distribution due to time constraints. Harsh raised concerns that Satyarthi would only present medals, leaving degree conferral to someone else, deeming it disrespectful to PhD recipients.

He also criticized the university's decision to award an honorary degree to O. P. Singh, then Director General of the Uttar Pradesh Police. Following his protest, on the day before the scheduled program, DGP Singh refused to accept the honorary degree from Allahabad University.
