= Goodnight Moon (disambiguation) =

Goodnight Moon may refer to:

- Goodnight Moon, a children's book
- "Goodnight Moon" (song), a song by the band Shivaree
- "Goodnight Moon" (Whitacre song), Eric Whitacre's 2012 arrangement of the children's book
- "Goodnight Moon", a song by the band Go Radio on Do Overs and Second Chances
- "Good Night, Moon", a science fiction short story
- The Goodnight Moon, an album by the band Rookie of the Year

== See also ==
- Good Night (disambiguation)
