= Goodnite =

Goodnite may refer to:

- "Goodnite", a song by Melody Gardot from Worrisome Heart
- Goodnite (album), a 1998 album by Walt Mink
- Goodnites, a brand of nighttime diapers

== See also ==
- Goodnight (disambiguation)
