= Do I Exist: A Riddle =

- Directed by: Dhruva Harsh
- Produced by: Surabhi Bhattacharya Dhruva Harsh Utpal Acharya
- Release date: 2019
- Running time: 16 minutes 38 seconds
- Country: India
- Languages: English; Hindi

Do I Exist: A Riddle is a short film by Dhruva Harsh. It comprises René Descartes's philosophy "Cogito, ergo sum" (I think, therefore I am) and Buddhist principles combined. This work of fiction is the manifestation of dream and death or life after death.

== Plot ==
Do I Exist: A Riddle is a short film about existing as a 'being' or not. In this film, the soul seeks transformation into a buddhist monk and redeems his soul from the body captivated with the charm of corporeal desire and 'maya' (delusion) even after death.

Here Siddhartha, the protagonist is already dead but still stuck in the matrix called ‘maya’ in Sanskrit and he seems utterly confused between life and death, dream and reality, forgets time and place and keeps dwelling in the same house where he lived with his wife called Marvi. Siddhartha's character is influenced by Gautama Buddha, a primary figure of Buddhism, and he is a modern portrayal of him. But here Siddhartha does not have any choice but to renounce his wife in seclusion but his wife Marvi leaves him over a quarrel about conceiving a baby.

== Cast ==
- Anurag Sinha as Siddhartha
- Nancy Thakkar as Marvi
- Nishant Karki as Monk

== Awards ==
- Official Selection: Pondicherry International Film Festival
- Official Selection: International Film Festival of Shimla
- Official Selection: Jaipur international film festival
- Best Cinematography: Chambal International Film Festival
- Best Editing Award: 12th Kolkata International Short Film Festival.
- Official Selection: Delhi International Film Festival.
- Official Selection: Panorama international film festival, Tunisia (2020)
- Official Selection: 3rd South Asian Film Festival
- Official Selection: Kalinga Global Film Festival.
- Official Selection: Bayelsa International Film Festival, Nigeria.
- Official Selection: Dhaka International Film Festival
- Official Selection: 22nd Rainbow film Festival London
