= Good Night =

Good Night or Goodnight may refer to:

== Film and television ==
- Good Night (2008 film), a short film from India
- Good Night (2023 film), an Indian Tamil-language film
- The Good Night, a 2007 film
- Good Night, and Good Luck, a 2005 film
- "Good Night", one of five mini-episodes from the Doctor Who shorts "Night and the Doctor"
- "Good Night" (Homeland), 10th episode of season 3 of the TV series Homeland
- "Good Night" (The Simpsons), a short from The Tracy Ullman Show featuring the debut of the main Simpsons family

== Music ==
=== Albums ===
- Goodnight, by William Fitzsimmons

=== Songs ===
- "Goodnight" (Babybird song), 1996
- "Good Night" (Beatles song), 1968
- "Good Night" (Reece Mastin song), 2011
- "A Good Night" (John Legend song), 2018
- "Goodnight", by Air Supply from Across the Concrete Sky
- "Goodnight", by Cher Lloyd from Sorry I'm Late
- "Goodnight", by Cliff Eberhardt, covered by,
  - Buffy Sainte-Marie from Coincidence and Likely Stories
  - Erasure from Other People's Songs
- "Good Night", by Dreamcatcher
- "Goodnight", by Galactic from Coolin' Off
- "Goodnight", by Idlewild from Warnings/Promises
- "Good Night", by Kanye West from Graduation
- "Good Night", by Masaharu Fukuyama
- "Good Night", by The Pillows from White Incarnation
- "Good Night", by Toby Fox, a track from the soundtrack of the 2015 video game Undertale
- "Good Night", by Zerobaseone from Melting Point
- "Goodnight", by ZOX from Line in the Sand
- "Goodnight", a 1965 single by Roy Orbison
- "Good Nights", by Fitz and the Tantrums from Let Yourself Free
- "Goodnight Goodnight", by Hot Hot Heat

== People ==
- Goodnight (surname), including a list of people named Goodnight

== Places ==
=== In Australia ===
- Good Night, Queensland, a locality in the Bundaberg Region

=== In the United States ===
- Goodnight, Kentucky, an unincorporated community
- Goodnight, Missouri, a village
- Goodnight, Oklahoma, an unincorporated community
- Goodnight, Texas, an unincorporated community
