= Saibal Chatterjee =

Indian film critic and writer

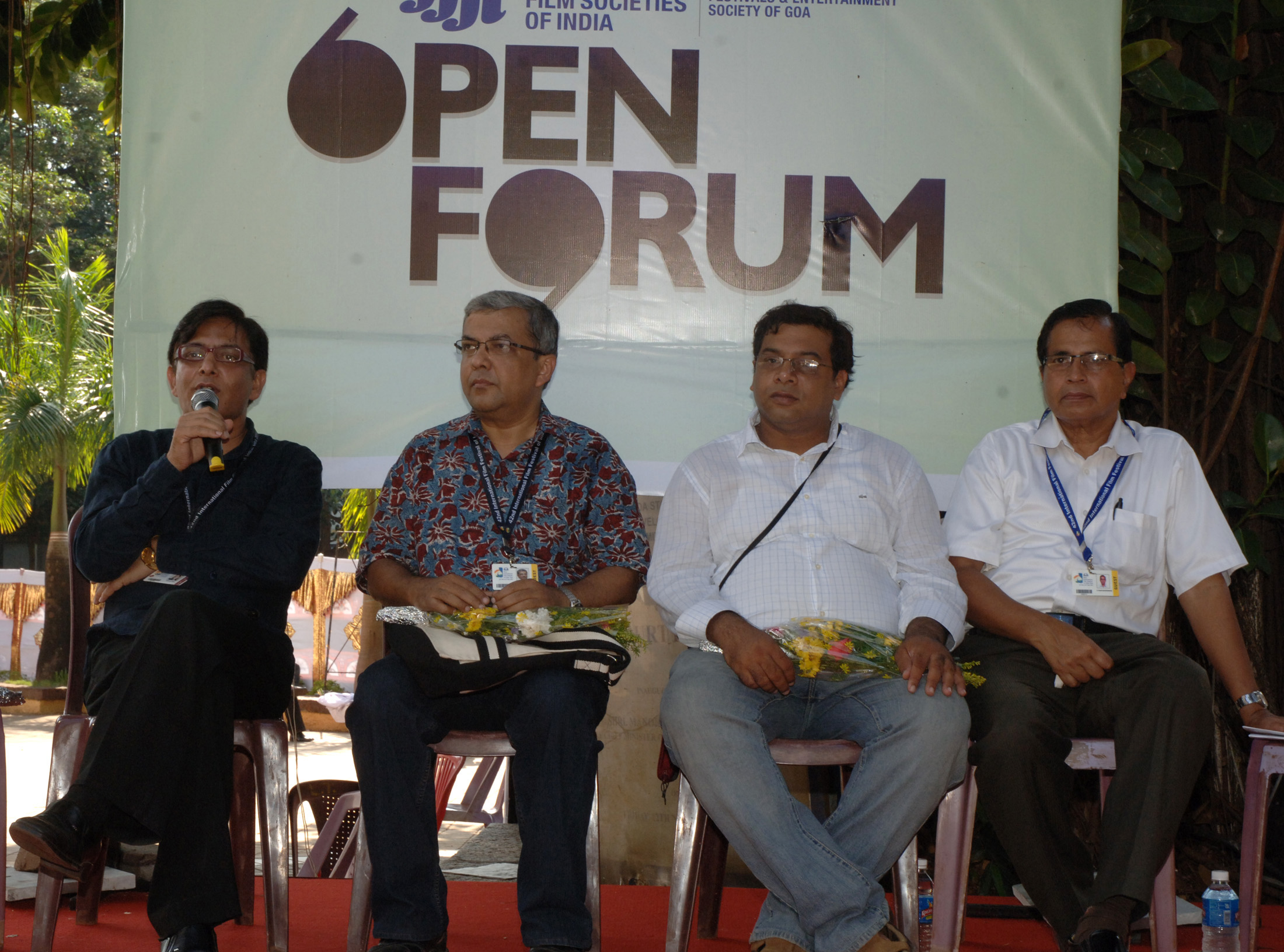
- Saibal Chatterjee, IFFI (2011)
- Occupations: Film critic, editor
- Known for: Founding member of FCCI
- Awards: National Film Award

Saibal Chatterjee is an Indian film critic, editor and documentary screenwriter. He is a founder member of the Film Critics Circle of India (FCCI) and was a member of the editorial board of Encyclopædia Britannica's Encyclopaedia of Hindi Cinema.

He was a columnist at BBC News, Business Standard, Hindustan Times and The Financial Express. He has also written for The Telegraph, The Times of India, and Outlook. In addition, he has served as the editor of TV World; and a consultant to Zee Premiere. He presently reviews films for NDTV. He has served on the team as well as jury of a variety of international film festivals. He was the festival director of the 2019 Pondicherry International Film Festival.

== Career ==
Chatterjee started his career as a journalist for The Telegraph, Kolkata's news desk in 1984 and worked there until he moved to New Delhi in 1990, joining The Times of India. He currently reviews film for NDTV. He also is the senior editorial consultant for the Financial Chronicle. He was the founding member of Indian Film Institute and currently serves as its Vice Chairman.

Throughout his career, he has covered international film festivals such as Cannes Film Festival, Toronto International Film Festival.

== Books ==
- Author - Echoes & Eloquences: The Life And Cinema Of Gulzar
- Co-author - Hollywood Bollywood: The Politics of Crossover Films
- Editor - Encyclopaedia of Hindi Cinema

== Awards ==
- 2003 - National Film Award - Best Film Critic at the 51st National Film Awards

== Member of the jury ==
- Aurangabad International Film Festival
- South Asian Short Film Festival
- Indian Film Institute
- IFFI Panorama
- Smile Foundation's Smile International Film Festival for Children and Youth
- Bengaluru Bengali Kannada Film Festival
