= Sanjay Mishra (actor) =

Indian actor (born 1963)

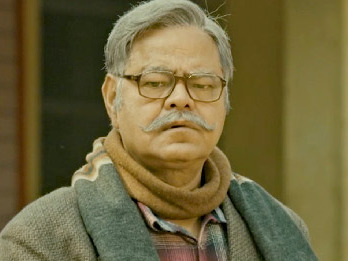
- Mishra in 2023
- Born: 6 October 1963 (age 62); Narayanpur, Darbhanga, Bihar, India
- Occupation: Actor
- Years active: 1991–present
- Spouses: Roshni Achreja m 1991 (separated); Kiran Mishra (m. 2009)
- Children: 2

Sanjay Mishra (born 6 October 1963) is an Indian actor known for his works predominantly in Hindi cinema and television. He has twice won the Filmfare Critics Award for Best Actor for his performances in the films Ankhon Dekhi (2015) and Vadh (2022) along with several other awards and nominations. He also won the National Film Award for Best Supporting Actor for his work in 2024 film Bhakshak.

An alumnus of National School of Drama, he made his acting debut in the 1995 film Oh Darling! Yeh Hai India!. Later films include Rajkumar (1996) and Satya (1998). He also appeared as Apple Singh, an "icon" used by ESPN Star Sports during the 1999 Cricket World Cup. He is known for his performances both in drama and comedy genre movie productions.

== Early life and background ==
Sanjay Mishra was born in Darbhanga, Bihar, into a Maithil Brahmin family from Sakri, Narayanpur, Darbhanga. Mishra married Kiran Mishra in 2009.

Mishra's father Shambhu Nath Mishra was an employee at the Press Information Bureau and both his grandparents were Indian civil servant. When his father got transferred he moved to Varanasi, where he studied in Kendriya Vidyalaya BHU. Mishra joined the National School of Drama and graduated in 1989.

== Career ==
=== Early career ===
Mishra did many commercials and small movie roles before he got the opportunity to stand Amitabh Bachchan in a Mirinda commercial. In 1991, on his first day of shooting the television series Chanakya, he reportedly took 28 takes. The director left him with an assistant director so that he could rehearse for the shoot. His first released movie was Oh Darling! Yeh Hai India! in 1995 in which he played a small part as a harmonium player.

=== Television actor and comedian ===
Mishra later acted in Satya and Dil Se.., which helped him in securing the role of Shukla, a corrupt Paan-loving employee, in the famous television sitcom Office Office. In the next few years, he acted mainly in TV serials before moving to films exclusively. He left television serials in 2005 after he got recognition for his role in Bunty Aur Babli and Apna Sapna Money Money.

Mishra is known for his comic roles, although he has played more serious roles in films such as Zameen, Charas, Plan, and Satya.

=== Film actor ===
In 2006, Mishra acted in and gained fame from the back-to-back hit films Golmaal: Fun Unlimited and Dhamaal. Over the next few years, he appeared in small roles in many multi-starer big banner films before getting nationwide popularity for his role as RGV in All the Best: Fun Begins and Phas Gaye Re Obama. Phas Gaye Re Obama was a serious comedy based on the recession. He directed a movie named Pranaam Walekum, which was released in January 2016, as well as Dhama Choukdhi, which also starred Dipraj Rana and model Rozlyn Khan.

In 2014, he played the critically acclaimed role of a male protagonist in the film Ankhon Dekhi, directed by Rajat Kapoor. Mishra won the Filmfare Critics Award for Best Actor for his role as Bauji, the protagonist of the film. His dialogue "Dhondu, Just Chill" and comic timing in All the Best gained him wide recognition. His latest release Ankhon Dekhi proved him as a serious actor. His movies Bhoothnath Returns, Kick and Dum Laga Ke Haisha all brought positive reviews. In 2013, he also acted as a leading actor in the film Saare Jahaan Se Mehnga.

His films Prem Ratan Dhan Payo, Dilwale and many small budget films released in 2015, all brought him accolades. During the ICC Cricket World Cup 2015, he did a commercial called Mauka Mauka.

== Filmography ==
Key
†	Denotes films that have not yet been released

=== Films ===
Year	Film	Role	Notes
1995	Oh Darling! Yeh Hai India!	Harmonium Man	
1996	Rajkumar		
1998	Wajood	Kanchan (camera operator)	
1998	Dil Se..	Terrorist	
1998	Satya	Vitthal Manjrekar	
2000	Jung	Jaggi	
2000	Phir Bhi Dil Hai Hindustani	Bomb Squad	
2000	Jwalamukhi		
2001	Albela	Gabru	
2001	Bagawat Ek Jung	Patwari	
2002	Kuch Tum Kaho Kuch Hum Kahein	Inspector Pandey	
2002	Saathiya	Brij	
2002	Chhal	Raja	
2003	Amma		
2003	Zameen	Fareed	
2004	Plan	Jaggi	
2004	Charas	Blind man	
2004	Rangli Chunariya Tohre Naam		Bhojpuri film
2005	Bunty Aur Babli	Q. Q. Qureshi	
2005	Tango Charlie	Tarun Chauhan's friend	
2005	Bluffmaster!	Jassi	
2006	Apna Sapna Money Money	The real Sarju Maharaj Banaraswale	
2006	Golmaal	Babli	
2006	Tom, Dick, and Harry		
2006	Pyare Mohan		
2007	Welcome	Pandit	
2007	Dhamaal	Babu Bhai (Aatank)	
2007	Journey Bombay to Goa	Cameraman	
2007	Rangli Chunariya Tere Naam	Daya Shankar	
2007	Anwar		
2007	Guru	Chhaganbhai (Guru's senior in Turkey)	
2008	Golmaal Returns	Subodh Mehra	
2008	Roadside Romeo	Chhainu (voice)	
2008	C Kkompany	Yadav	
2008	God Tussi Great Ho	Murari	
2008	Tashan	Misir	
2008	Krazzy 4	Traffic Inspector Dayanand Dubey	
2008	One Two Three	Pinto - Yadav's goon	
2008	Rama Rama Kya Hai Drama	Mishra	
2008	Halla Bol	Sanjay Mishra	
2009	Thanks Maa	Yusuf Charsi	
2009	Naughty @ 40		
2009	Meri Padosan	Vijay 'Viju' Pundit	
2009	Kya Time Hai Yaar		
2009	Khallballi!: Fun Unlimited	Producer	
2009	All the Best: Fun Begins	RGV (Raghunandandas Goverdhandas Vakavle)	
2009	Love Khichdi	Tambe	
2009	Sankat City	Lingam	
2009	Meri Padosan	Vijay Kumar	
2009	Ek: The Power of One	Advocate Parminder 'Pammi' Singh	
2009	Aloo Chaat	Chhadami	
2009	Jugaad	Bakshi Jugaad	
2010	Phas Gaye Re Obama	Bhai Sahab	
2010	Toonpur Ka Super Hero	Shyam	
2010	Golmaal 3	Daga	
2010	The Camp	Boss	
2010	Mar Jawan Gur Khake	Mishra	
2010	Chase	Haricharan Dubey	
2010	Pappu Can't Dance Saala	Fast Food Vendor/owner	
2010	Atithi Tum Kab Jaoge?	Watchman	
2010	Hello Darling	Dead Body	
2011	Chatur Singh Two Star	Lallanpur	
2011	Chala Mussaddi... Office Office	Shukla	
2011	Bin Bulaye Baraati	Hazari	
2011	Satrangee Parachute	Daroga Pratap Sin	
2011	Utt Pataang	Bolu	
2011	Kushal Mangal		
2011	Shaadii Ke Liiye Loan		
2011	Kya Karein Kya Na Karein		
2012	Bumboo	Vincent Gomes	
2012	Be Careful	Ram Khilawan Tiwari/Lobo	
2012	Delhi Safari	Marela	
2012	Khiladi 786	Jeevannlal Praanlal D'costa	
2012	Son of Sardaar	Club Owner	
2012	Hum Tum Shabana	Munna Military (Manoj Tyage)	
2012	Joker	Raja	
2013	Boss	Trilok	
2013	War Chhod Na Yaar	Commander Khan	
2013	Ammaa Ki Boli	Rukmi	
2013	Phata Poster Nikla Hero	Jogi	
2013	Singh Sahab the Great	Murli	
2013	Choron Ki Baaraat	Bhaiya Ji	
2013	Just U & Me		
2013	Jolly LLB	Ram Gopal Varma	
2013	Saare Jahaan Se Mehnga	Puttan Pal	
2014	Zed Plus	Hidayatulla	
2014	Spark		
2014	Kick	Ramavtaar Rathi (Senior Inspector)	
2014	Chal Bhaag	Tata Singh	
2014	Bhoothnath Returns	Gabdi Kumar	
2014	The Xposé	Announcer	
2014	Lucky Kabootar	Babaji	
2014	Ankhon Dekhi	Raje Bauji	
2014	Gollu Aur Pappu	Cameraman	
2015	Dilwale	Oscar Bhai	
2015	Rang Li Chunariya Tere Naam		Bhojpuri film
2015	Sankarabharanam	Bhai Saab	Telugu film
2015	Prem Ratan Dhan Payo	Guruji/Ravan	
2015	Shaadi Abhi Baaki Hai		
2015	Hogaya Dimaagh Ka Dahi	Ashique Ali	
2015	Meeruthiya Gangsters	Mama	
2015	Thoda Lutf Thoda Ishq	Neta Ji	
2015	Second Hand Husband	Lawyer	
2015	Miss Tanakpur Haazir Ho	Pandit	
2015	Kick 2		Telugu film
2015	Masaan	Pandit Vidyadhar Pathak	
2015	Baankey Ki Crazy Baraat	Kanaiya	
2015	Dhondooss Just Chill		
2015	Dum Laga Ke Haisha	Chandra Prakash Tiwari	
2015	Chal Guru Ho Jaa Shuru		
2015	Objection My God	Chitra/Gupt	
2016	Shor Se Shuruaat		
2016	Gandhigiri	Bakait Singh	
2016	Exotic Bride		
2016	Yeh Hai Lollipop		
2016	Baaghi	Blind Driver	
2016	Great Grand Masti	Antakshari Baba	
2016	Global Baba	Bhola Pandit	
2016	Santa Banta Pvt Ltd	Akbar Allahabadi	
2017	Muskurahatein	Dr. Yakub Ansari	
2017	Golmaal Again	Babli Bhai	
2017	Newton		Special appearance
2017	Baadshaho	Tikla	
2017	Guest Iin London	Qureshi	
2017	Kadvi Hawa	Hedu	
2017	Laali Ki Shaadi Mein Laddoo Deewana		
2017	Brina		
2017	Anaarkali of Aarah	VC Sahab	
2017	Angrezi Mein Kehte Hain		
2017	Jolly LLB 2	Retired Policeman	
2017	Prakash Electronic		
2018	Ekkees Tareekh Shubh Muhurat	Girdhari Lal Sharma	
2018	FryDay	Manchanda	
2018	Bhaiaji Superhit	Dr. Gyan Prakash Buddisagar	
2018	Nine Hours In Mumbai	Bhola Bhai	
2018	BRINA	Khekram	
2018	Mangal Ho	Udhaar De	
2018	Angrezi Mein Kehte Hain	Yashwant Batra	
2018	Kaamyaab	Sudheer	
2019	Waah Zindagi	Grandfather Ramkaran	
2019	P Se Pyaar F Se Faraar	Mr. Inquiry	
2019	Jabariya Jodi	Duniya Lal Yadav	
2019	Ammaa Ki Boli	Rukmi	
2019	Booo Sabki Phategi	Nainsukh	Web series
2019	Milan Talkies	Usman Bhai	
2019	Rakkhosh	Kumar John	
2019	Total Dhamaal	Jonny	
2020	Bahut Hua Samman	Ram Prasad aka Bakchod Baba	
2020	Yaara	Chaman	Released On Zee5
2020	Gwalior	Shambhu Nath Mishra	
2020	Tanhaji	Narrator	
2020	Kaanchli	Bhoja	
2022	36 Farmhouse	Jay Prakash (JP)	
2022	Bachchhan Pandey	Befferia Chacha	
2022	Bhool Bhulaiyaa 2	Bade Pandit	
2022	Cirkus	Rai Bahadur	
2022	Vadh	Shambhunath Mishra	
2022	Holy Cow	Salim Ansari	
2023	Hume Toh Loot Liya	Lucky	MX Player film
2023	Chal Zindagi	Sada	
2023	Bholaa	Constable Angad Yadav	
2023	Jogira Sara Ra Ra	Chacha Chaudhry	
2023	Mumbaikar	Taxi Driver	Jio Cinema film
2023	Coat	Mohan	
2023	Guthlee Ladoo	Harishankar (School principal)	
2023	Dvand: The Internal Conflict	Guruji	
2024	Bhakshak	Bhaskar Sinha	Netflix film
2024	Luv You Shankar		
2024	Bhool Bhulaiyaa 3	Bada Pandit	
2024	Jaaiye Aap Kahaan Jayenge	Sadhu	
2025	Badass Ravi Kumar	Rana	
2025	Bhool Chuk Maaf	Bhagwan Das	
2025	Son of Sardaar 2	Bantu Pandey	
2025	Heer Express	Mama	
2025	Durlabh Prasad Ki Dusri Shadi	Durlabh Prasad	
2026	Vadh 2	Shambhunath Mishra	
2026	Kartavya	Ashok	Netflix film
2026	Phera	Pannalal Chatterjee	Bengali movie
2026	Dhamaal 4	Jonny	

=== Television ===
Year	TV Series	Role	Notes
1991	Chanakya		DD National
1995	Sorry Meri Lorry		
1996	Kabhi Paas Kabhi Fail		
1996	Naya Daur		
1996	Aahat	Mainak	Season 1 (Episode 58 & 59)
1997	Hum Bambai Nai Jayenge		
1998	Bhawron Ne Phool Khilaya		
1998	Just Mohhabbat	Actor	
1999	Gharwali Baharwali		
1999	Break Ke Baad		
1999	Hip Hip Hurray	Arts Teacher	
2000	Office Office	Shukla	SAB TV
2001	CID	Rajesh	2 episodes
2002	Ram Khilawan And Family		
2002	Line of Control	Chand Mohammad	
2003	Public Hai Sab Jaanti Hai		
2003	Woh Dus Din		
2004	Naya Office Office		
2004	Baat Ek Raat Ki		
2005	Mohalla Mohabbat Wala		
2008	Lapataganj		
2008	Comedy Circus		
2013	Taarak Mehta Ka Ooltah Chashmah	As Himself	For Promotion of Saare Jahaan Se Mehnga
2019	Booo Sabki Phategi	Nainsukh	ALTBalaji series
2021	Runaway Lugaai	Narendra Sinha	MX Player series
2022	Bed Stories	The Bed	Disney+ Hotstar
2026	Chiraiya	Sukumar Bhramar	JioHotstar series

=== As director ===
- Pranaam Walekum
- Dhama Choukdhi

=== Other works ===
He gave his voice for Pumbaa in The Lion King for the Hindi language audio.

== Awards and nominations ==
Year⁣	Award	Work⁣	Category⁣	Result⁣⁣
2015	Filmfare Awards	Ankhon Dekhi	Best Actor (Critics)	Won
2016	Filmfare Awards	Masaan	Best Supporting Actor	Nominated
2021	Filmfare Awards	Kaamyaab	Best Actor (Critics)	Nominated
2023	Filmfare Awards	Vadh	Best Actor (Critics)	Won
2021	Filmfare OTT Awards	Runaway Lugaai	Best Supporting Actor in a Comedy Series	Nominated
2015	FOI Online Awards	Masaan	Best Supporting Actor	Nominated
2020	FOI Online Awards	Kaamyaab	Best Actor	Nominated
2014	Jagran Film Festival	Ankhon Dekhi	Best Actor	Won
2015	Jagran Film Festival	Masaan	Best Supporting Actor	Won
2003	Indian Telly Awards	Public Hai Sab Janti Hai	Best Actor in a Comic Role	Nominated
2004	Indian Telly Awards	Public Hai Sab Janti Hai	Best Actor in a Comic Role	Nominated
2011	Producers Guild Film Awards	Phas Gaye Re Obama	Best Actor in a Comic Role	Nominated
2016	Producers Guild Film Awards	Masaan	Best Actor in a Supporting Role	Nominated
2010	Screen Awards	All the Best: Fun Begins	Best Comedian	Nominated
2015	Screen Awards	Ankhon Dekhi	Best Actor	Nominated
2018	Screen Awards	Anaarkali of Aarah	Best Actor (Critics)	Nominated
2016	Zee Cine Awards	Masaan	Best Actor in a Supporting Role – Male	Won
2024	National Film Award	Bhakshak	National Film Award for Best Supporting Actor	Won
