= Narayanpur, Sakri, Darbhanga =

Village in Darbhanga, Bihar, India

Narayanpur (Sakri) नारायणपुर / نرائن پور
- A Village in Darbhanga (Bihar)
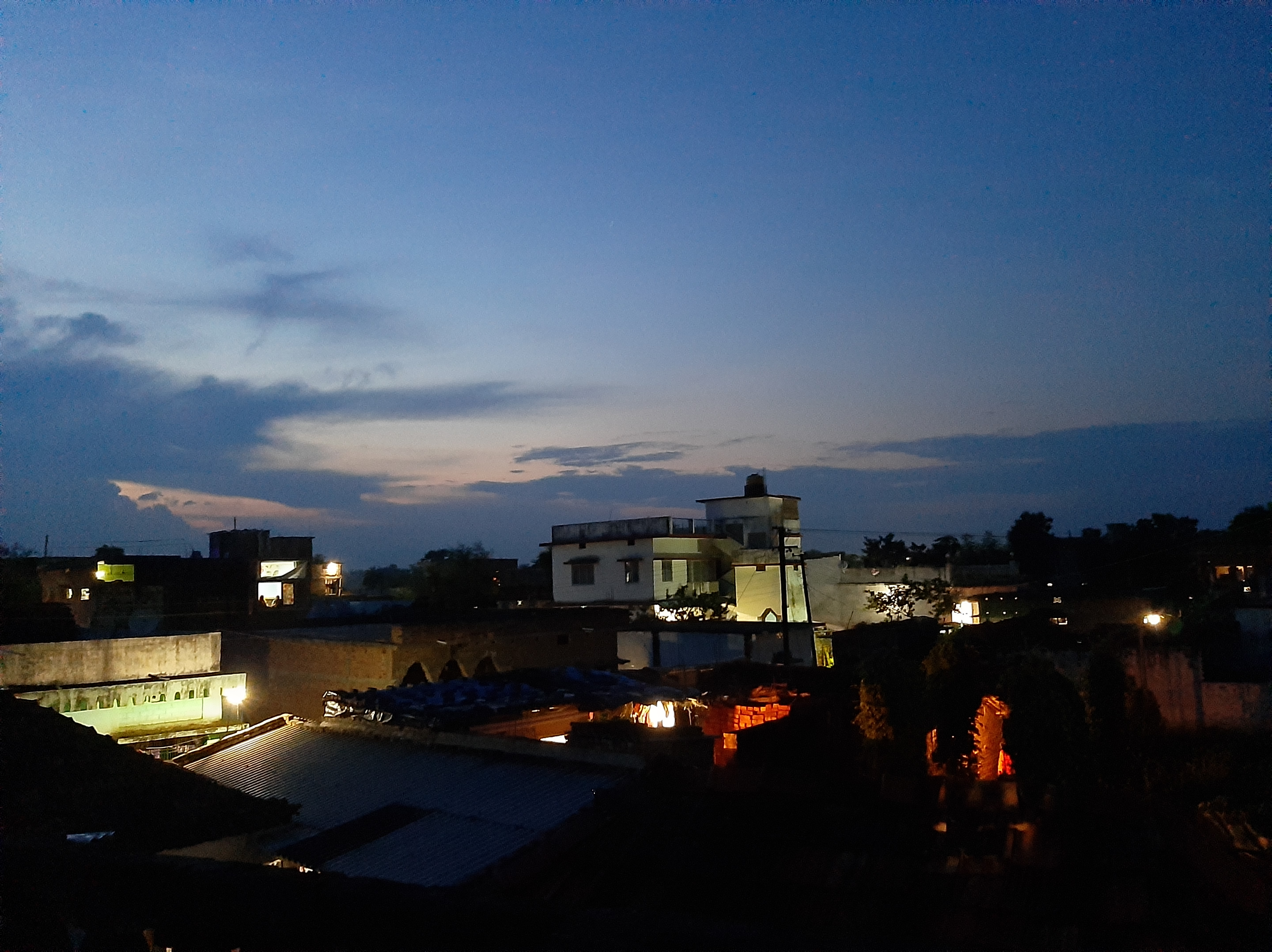

- Location in Darbhanga, India Narayanpur (Sakri) (India)
- Coordinates: 26°11′23.9″N 86°05′08.0″E
- Country: India
- State: Bihar
- District: Darbhanga

Government
  - Type: Panchayat
  - Body: Raghopur

Area
  - Total: 6.44 km^{2} (2.49 sq mi)
- Elevation: 56 m (184 ft)

Population (2011)
  - Total: 26,655
  - Density: 4,140/km^{2} (10,700/sq mi)

Languages
  - Official: Hindi, Maithili, Urdu

Literacy (2011)
  - Total literates: 60.37%
- Time zone: UTC+5:30 (IST)
- PIN: 847239 (Darbhanga)
- Telephone/STD code: 06272
- Vehicle registration: BR-07
- Lok Sabha constituency: Darbhanga
- Vidhan Sabha constituency: Darbhanga Rural
- Website: darbhanga.bih.nic.in

Narayanpur or Narainpur (نرائن پور/नारायणपुर) is a village in Darbhanga district, Bihar state, India. It is located 24 km (15 mi) from Darbhanga, the district headquarters.

It is a village with a population of 26,655, according to the 2011 census of India, The village has experienced significant development in recent years and has several urban-like amenities and facilities. National Highway 27 (NH 27) is located near the village, while Sakri Junction Railway Station is situated approximately 2 km (1.2 mi).

Hindi and Maithili are the main local languages in the area. Urdu is also widely spoken by a considerable number of people. A local variety, which is a mixture of Maithili and Urdu, is also spoken by some members of the Muslim Community.

== Geography ==
The climate of this region is moderate. Local winds such as the Loo (wind) blow during the summer. There is a balanced ecosystem, a series of mango orchids are being planted with different types of species. The Kamala River passes through Narayanpur and forms an important part of the village's local geography and landscape.

== Religion ==
There are four mosques in the area, one of which is Narayanpur Jama Masjid, located adjacent to TZ Road. People gather at the mosque for Friday prayer. There are also several temples in the area, including the Narayanpur Mahavir Temple, which is dedicated to Lord Hanuman and is located in the centre of the local market, known as Narayanpur Bazaar.

== Economy ==
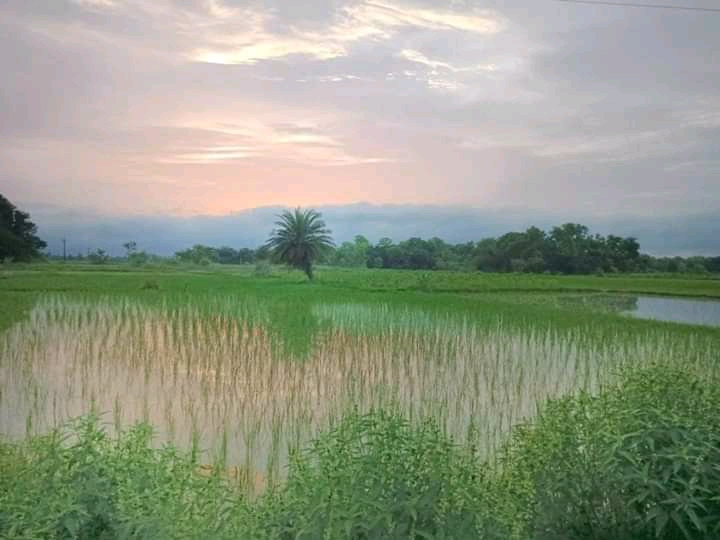
Paddy fields at Narayanpur

Economically, most people in the area are engaged in agricultural activities. Farmers generally have small landholdings and practice traditional methods of agriculture. As the land is fertile, a variety of crops, including paddy, wheat and various types of vegetables, are grown in the region. Vegetable cultivation and trade are important economic activities, and the area has a well-known local vegetable market that serves the surrounding villages. Fishing is also practiced by local communities, particularly in the ponds and other water bodies in the area. Overall, the local economy is relatively well-developed, with agriculture, vegetable trade, fishing, and other small-scale commercial activities contributing to the livelihoods of the people.

== Education ==
There are several educational institutions in and around Narayanpur. These include a middle school (Maqtab), which provides education in the Urdu medium, and the old Madrasa Ilahiya, an Islamic school run by the Government of Bihar. The area also has several government schools and private schools, including Sun Flower School, one of the oldest private schools in the area. New Doon Public School and Kidzee International Pre-School are also situated along TZ Road in Narayanpur. J. N. College, Nehra, a constituent college of Lalit Narayan Mithila University Kameshwaranagar Darbhanga, Bihar, is located approximately 3.7 km (2.3 mi) from Narayanpur in Nehra. The college offers undergraduate-level courses to students from the surrounding area. The village features various local educational and preparatory initiatives, such as Junior Quest, which support academic development in the locality. The growing emphasis on education has been a key factor driving social and economic progress in the village.

== Transport ==
The Sakri–Bahera Road, designated as a Major District Road (MDR), passes through the village and connects with National Highway 27 at Sakri, Bihar, approximately 3 km away. The TZ Bridge, constructed over the Kamala River, is located along the Sakri–Bahera Road within the village limits (26.1896°N 86.0858°E). The local TZ Road also serves the village area, intersecting near the river front and providing vital connectivity to the residential quarters and community institutions within Narayanpur (26.1896°N 86.0844°E).

== Notable people ==
- Sanjay Mishra, a renowned Bollywood actor, has his ancestral residence on TZ Road in his native village of Narayanpur, located near Sakri (Madhubani) in the Darbhanga district. He continues to visit his village almost every year, especially during festivals.
