= Honourable Mention =

- Directed by: Dhruva Harsh
- Produced by: Glorious Gonardh Productions
- Release date: May 2015
- Running time: 29 minutes 42 seconds
- Country: India
- Language: Hindi, English

Honourable Mention is a film by Dhruva Harsh. The film is originally based on a short story from the collection Song Without End And Other Stories by Neelum Saran Gour.

== Plot ==
This film opens with a character called Dr. Das, a professor at Botanical Institute of India, Allahabad. He is standing on the bus stop and missed more than half a dozen buses as it was norm with him. He is a very dedicated researcher but never cares about his promotion and credits even if taken by someone else. He confesses, once before his assistants after hearing that one of the assistants fail to get success just by two marks, that he's never ever been fortunate in his life and missed everything what was in his way just by the narrowest margin possible. Even he could not own his beloved once from the brutal clutch of destiny. Even though, all three research assistants of Dr. Abhijit Das send a paper to the Seattle Conference, U.S.A., fifteen days before when it was planned, after forging Das's signature, but they too could not change their professor's destiny. His paper is considered just an 'honourable mention' there because of the theory that they propounded has already been anticipated by German scientists. Nonetheless, this film gives an optimistic note at the end when they were safeguarded by the fate itself, when a bus meets with an accident on the bridge that professor denied getting in.

== Awards ==
- Best Screenplay Award :Rolling Reels International film Festival, Hyderabad (2015)
- Official Selection : 21st International Film Festival Kolkata (2015)
- Official Selection :12 International Short Film Festival Kolkata (2015)
- Official Selection :International Film Festival of Prayag, Allahabad (2016)
- Official Selection: Ozark film festival U.S.A (2015)
- Official Selection:IndieWise International Film Festival Miami U.S.A
