= Roshan Abbas =

Indian radio and television personality

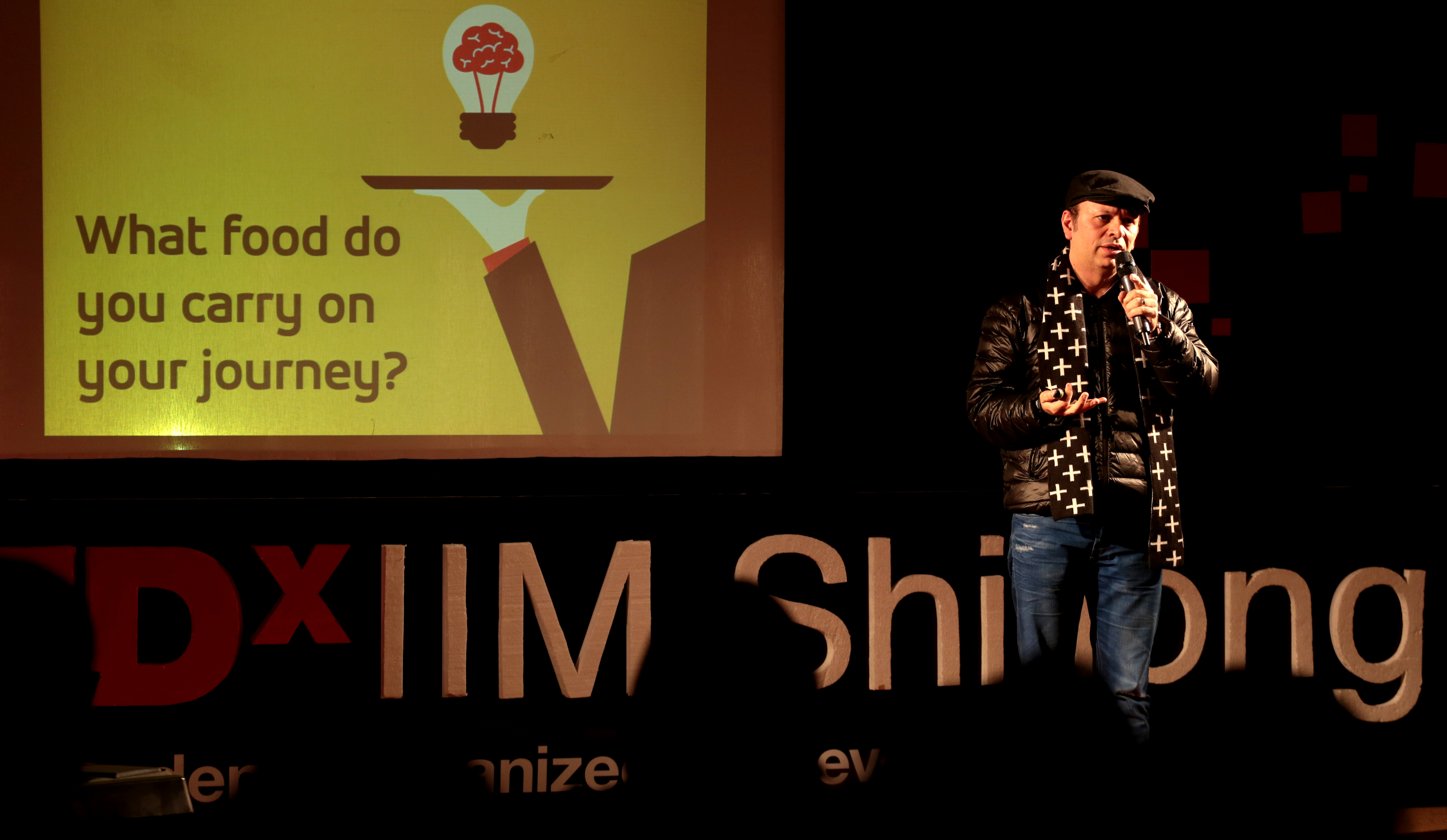
- Born: Lucknow
- Education: Hindu College, University of Delhi Jamia Millia Islamia, New Delhi La Martinière College, Lucknow
- Known for: Radio Jockey, Entrepreneur, Television Show Host, Actor, Writer, Director, Event Manager
- Website: https://www.roshanabbas.com/

Roshan Abbas is an Indian media professional.

== Career ==
Abbas studied at Hindu College, University of Delhi, graduating with a BA degree in 1992, and completed Mass Communication from AJK Mass communication Jamia Millia Islamia in New Delhi. He started Encompass in 1996, which grew from a creative event agency to an experiential marketing agency that is now aligned with the JWT network.

As a radio jockey he created over 3,000 hours of radio programming, winning four awards at the Radio and Television Artiste Awards in India. Having had a career as a TV host for shows like Family Fortunes, Born Lucky, and This Is Your Life, he was named Best TV Game Show Host for Family Fortunes in 2001. Abbas served on the promo jury for Cannes Lions 2008.

In 2009, Abbas directed Always Kabhi Kabhi based on an adaptation of a play about high school called Graffiti that he had written and directed back in 1999. The lines for the film were written in 2003, with the help of his co-writer, Ranjit Raina. The film is based on Delhi's school life and was filmed in Delhi, Mumbai and Lucknow.

Abbas, along with Gaurav Kapur and Ankur Tewari, founded Kommune, a Mumbai-based performance arts collective.

== Personal life ==
Roshan is married to Shaheen, and has a son and a daughter.
