= Giselli Monteiro =

Brazilian former model and Bollywood actress

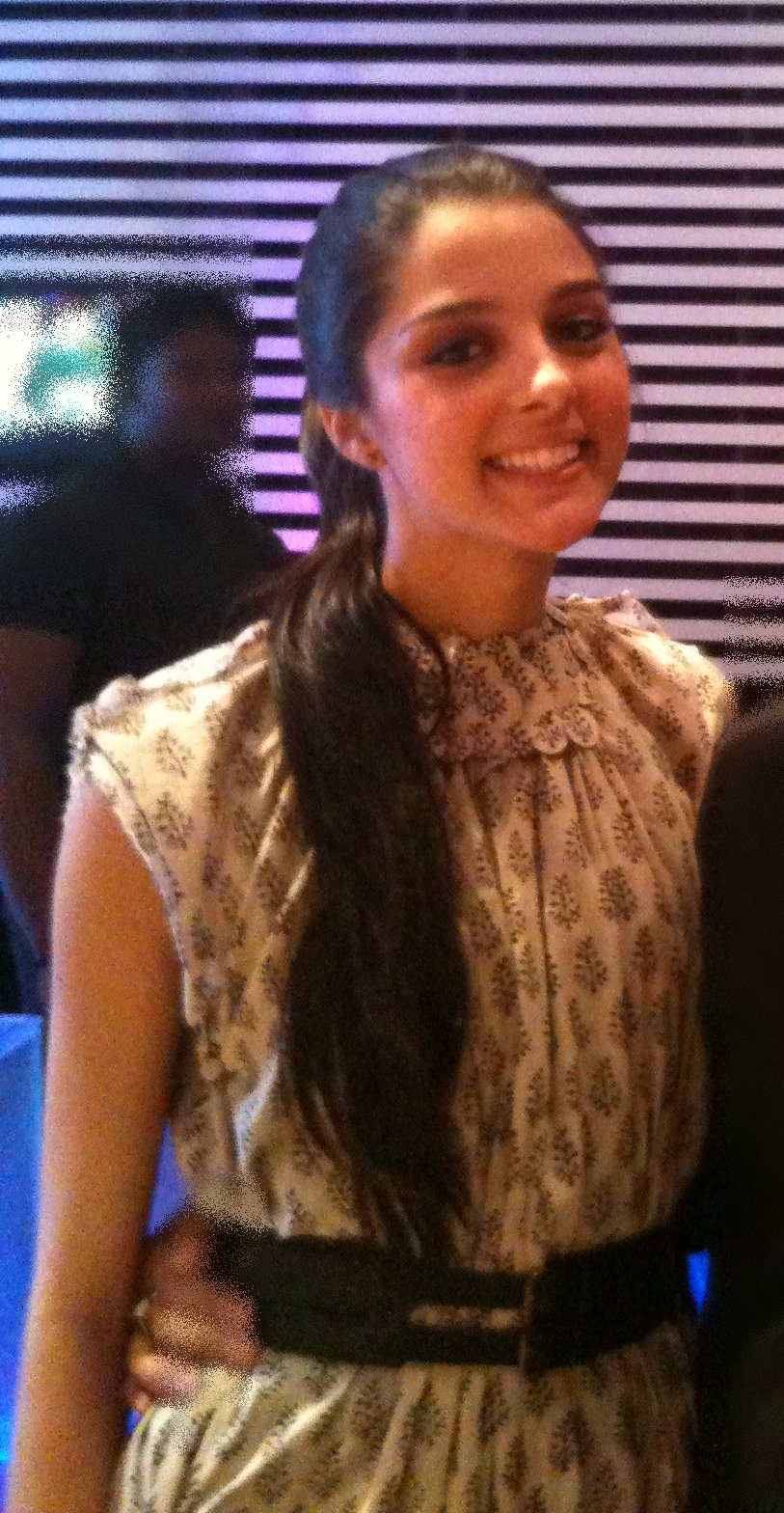
- Born: Espírito Santo, Brazil
- Occupations: Actress; model
- Years active: 2007–2015
- Modeling information
- Agency: Inega Model Management

Giselli Monteiro is a Brazilian former model and Bollywood actress. She made her film-debut playing Harleen Kaur in the 2009 Bollywood film Love Aaj Kal, directed by Imtiaz Ali.

== Early life and career ==
Monteiro was born in Espírito Santo, Brazil. She started her modeling career at the age of seventeen and has travelled to Italy, Germany, France, Greece, Hong Kong, Singapore, Thailand and Philippines. She came to Mumbai, India in 2008. She began her acting career in Bollywood, portraying the role of the old-fashioned Punjabi girl, Harleen Kaur, in Imtiaz Ali's Love Aaj Kal which also stars Saif Ali Khan and Deepika Padukone. She was purposely kept under wraps during the film's promotion. Following the film's release, her identity was revealed, and it was also revealed that she had approached Ali through designer Anaita Shroff Adajania to audition for the role of Jo, Saif Ali Khan's girlfriend in the second half of the film, but, on his wife's suggestion Ali took her for Harleen's part, especially since he had not been able to cast for that role despite auditioning girls from all over India.

In addition to acting, Monteiro has been a brand ambassador of Wills Lifestyle, Movil Mobiles and PC Jewellers in India.

In May 2010 Monteiro appeared on the Fantástico broadcast by Rede Globo in her home country, Brazil speaking about Mumbai.

After a successful career in modelling Monteiro quit after three films altogether in 2014 to pursue architecture at the University of Vila Velha, in Espírito Santo, Brazil. According to her she never intended to be in films, and studying architecture was her passion that she wanted to pursue.

== Filmography ==
Year	Film	Role	Notes
2009	Love Aaj Kal	Harleen Kaur	
2011	Always Kabhi Kabhi	Aishwarya Dhawan	
2015	Pranaam Walekum		Unreleased film
