= Aye Zindagi =

Aye Zindagi may refer to:

- Aye Zindagi (film), a 2022 Indian drama film
- Aye Zindagi (TV series), a 2015 Pakistani television serial
