= Shivam Pradhan =

Indian actor

- Born: India
- Died: 29 October 2016; India
- Education: Ramjas College
- Occupation: Actor
- Years active: 2010-2017
- Relatives: Piyush Pradhan (father); Aparna Pradhan (mother)

Shivam Pradhan (died 29 October 2016) was an Indian actor. He established his career in Hindi films.

== Acting career ==
He started acting in plays from school. In class 11th, he acted in his first play Ashadh Ka Ek Din, written by Mohan Rakesh.

In theater, he acted in various plays, such as the Roman play Peer Gynt in Hindi and Bertolt Brecht's play Mother Courage and Her Children in Hindi (by Neelabh Ashk).

He worked as a dubbing artist for animation series on Hungama and Disney.

He worked in 270 episodes of Pragaya channel's Info-tainment series.

He worked for 13 episodes of Tata Sky's Daily Zindagi ad campaign.

He was the host at the Star Parivaar Awards (2015).

=== Filmography ===
Year	Title	Role	Director	Notes
2008	Good Night	Ratan	Geetika Narang	
2010	Do Dooni Chaar	Waiter at Paratha	Habib Faisal	
2016	Tere Bin Laden: Dead or Alive	Daaga	Abhishek Sharma	
2016	Kerry on Kutton	Hippy Thakur	Ashok Yadav	
2017	Phillauri	Piyush	Anshai Lal	
2017	Baked	Bansi Bhaiya	Vishwajoy Mukherjee	Web Series

== Death ==
He was suffering from a breathing problem during the last 7 years before his death. He died on 29 October 2016.
