= Aradhana Jagota =

Indian screenplay writer and actress

- Occupations: Actress; Model; Screenplay writer
- Years active: 2013–2016

Aradhana Jagota is a Screenplay Writer and actress who made her television debut with Anil Kapoor's 24 (2013). She made her independent film debut with the film Kerry on Kutton (2016). Her short film Khajaou (2016) was one of the few Indian films to get selected at Cannes Film Festival.

== Early life ==
Born 1990 in New Delhi to a Punjabi family to Vandana Jagota (textile designer) and Sandeep Jagota (Civil Engineer), she has one younger brother, Adhiraj Jagota, who is an architect. She is married to businessman Vinay Matwani. Aradhana attended Summer Fields School, where she found a liking for acting. Jagota graduated in Mass communication from the Asian School of Media Studies, where she acted in films produced by her fellow students. Aradhana moved to Mumbai in 2015 to begin a career in modelling and acting and eventually found her calling in Writing.
