= Love Aaj Kal (2009 film) =

2009 Indian film by Imtiaz Ali

- Theatrical release poster
- Directed by: Imtiaz Ali
- Written by: Imtiaz Ali
- Produced by: Saif Ali Khan; Dinesh Vijan
- Starring: Saif Ali Khan; Deepika Padukone; Giselli Monteiro; Rishi Kapoor
- Cinematography: Natty Subramaniam
- Edited by: Aarti Bajaj
- Music by: Songs: Pritam; Background Score: Salim–Sulaiman
- Production companies: Illuminati Films; Maddock Films
- Distributed by: Eros International
- Release date: 31 July 2009
- Running time: 129 minutes
- Country: India
- Language: Hindi
- Budget: ₹35 crore
- Box office: ₹120 crore

Love Aaj Kal (transl. Love These Days / Love Today and Yesterday) is a 2009 Indian Hindi-language romantic comedy-drama film written and directed by Imtiaz Ali and produced by Saif Ali Khan and Dinesh Vijan under the production of Illuminati Films and Maddock Films. Starring Khan and Deepika Padukone, it features Rishi Kapoor and Giselli Monteiro in supporting roles with Neetu Kapoor in a special appearance. The film follows Jai and Meera's journey, and portrays the feeling of pure love which never changes, although the perspective of realizing one's soulmate has changed over time.

Love Aaj Kal was released theatrically in India and worldwide on 31 July 2009. Produced on a budget of ₹35 crore, the film emerged as a critical and commercial success at the box-office, grossing ₹120 crore worldwide, ranking as the second-highest grossing Hindi film of the year. Upon release, it received positive reviews from critics for its novel concept, story, screenplay, direction, dialogues, soundtrack, humor, costumes, cinematography and performances of the cast.

Love Aaj Kal led the 55th Filmfare Awards with 12 nominations including Best Film, Best Director (Ali), Best Actor (Khan) and Best Actress (Padukone), and won 2 awards – Best Lyricist (Irshad Kamil for "Aaj Din Chadheya") and Best Choreography (Bosco–Caesar for "Chor Bazaari").

Love Aaj Kal was remade in Telugu as Teen Maar (2011). A spiritual successor of the same name directed by Ali, starring Kartik Aaryan with Khan's daughter Sara Ali Khan, was released in 2020.

== Plot ==
Jai Vardhan Singh and Meera Pandit are a modern couple living in London. Although happy together, they don't believe in holding each other back. When career opportunities arise, they amicably break up but remain friends. Meera moves to India, while Jai stays in London, hoping to land his dream job at Golden Gate Inc. in San Francisco. Jai starts dating a Swiss woman named Jo, and Meera gradually develops feelings for her boss, Vikram Joshi. Both believe they’ve moved on.

After his breakup, Jai meets Veer Singh Panesar, a great believer in love. Veer shares his own love story (which, while set in the past, runs simultaneously) with Jai in an effort to convince him not to let go of Meera. He narrates how he fell in love with Harleen Kaur at first sight and pledged to marry her, despite never having spoken to her. Jai mocks Veer’s old-fashioned ideals, but eventually agrees to visit Meera in India at Veer’s insistence.

Meera is stunned, and the two lie to both Jo and Vikram to spend time with each other. They realize how much they still like each other's company. Jai and Jo break up as Jai is unable to reciprocate the deeper feelings that Jo longs for. On the day Jai is to leave, Vikram proposes to Meera. She meets Jai secretly, who tells her she should make a decision. Angry, Meera tells him to leave her life or else she will never be able to really move on. Parallel to this in the flashback, Harleen has told Veer she was engaged without being told, and he must leave her.

Jai is called to his dream job in San Francisco the same day that Meera realizes her marriage is a mistake. She tells Vikram the truth and calls Jai, but he tells her about the Golden Gate. Realizing he is going to San Francisco, she tells him nothing. Meanwhile, in the past, Veer declares his intentions of marrying Harleen but is badly beaten by her family.

Jai begins to lose interest in his "dream job," finding that he is not as happy as he thought he would be. He is beaten by some thugs when, while being mugged, he refuses to give them a picture of Meera. He then realizes he still loves her and goes back to India. He finds Vikram, who informs him that Meera left him. In the past, Veer travels to Harleen's house on the day of her wedding and convinces her mother that Harleen can only be happy with him. Harleen's mother lets Veer elope with her daughter, and the two marry happily. In the present, Jai and Meera have a heart-touching reunion.

== Cast ==
- Saif Ali Khan in a dual role as
  - Jai Vardhan Singh, Meera's boyfriend
  - Veer Singh Panesar, Harleen's boyfriend
- Rishi Kapoor as Older Veer Singh Panesar, Harleen's husband
- Deepika Padukone as Meera Pandit, Jai's girlfriend
- Giselli Monteiro as Harleen Kaur, Veer's girlfriend (voice dubbed by Mona Ghosh Shetty)
- Neetu Kapoor as Older Harleen Kaur Panesar, Veer's wife (special appearance)
- Vir Das as Shonty
- Raj Zutshi as Vinod Singh, Harleen's father
- Rahul Khanna as Vikram Joshi, Meera's ex-husband
- Florence Brudenell-Bruce as Jo, Jai's ex-girlfriend
- Kavi Shastri as Jaat
- Sagar Arya as Jai's friend
- Mandi Sidhu as Colly
- Sheena Bhattessa as Neha Singh, Jai's sister
- Dolly Ahluwalia as Mrs. Neha Kaur, Harleen's grandmother
- Rajiv Nema as Bangladeshi taxi driver
- Amanda Rosario as Amanda
- Himanshu Solanki
- Ajay Kalyansingh as Guy at church

== Production ==
=== Development ===
Love Aaj Kal was first announced by director Imtiaz Ali in 2008. It is his third film as a director. The film marks Saif Ali Khan's debut as a producer and is produced under Khan and Dinesh Vijan's Illuminati Films and Vijan's Maddock Films.

=== Casting ===
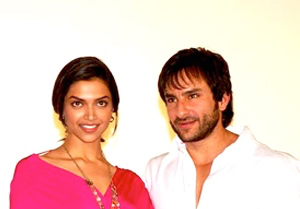
The film marked Saif Ali Khan and Deepika Padukone's first of many collaborations

Saif Ali Khan, also the producer was cast to play the dual roles of Jai and Veer. Khan termed the role among his "favourite onscreen characters". Deepika Padukone was cast to play Meera, in her first film with Khan. Ali later said that casting Padukone was a "risk", mainly because she was a "newcomer". Khan's then-girlfriend Kareena Kapoor who had earlier worked with Ali in Jab We Met (2007) lobbied hard for the part of the leading lady and openly expressed disappointment as not being cast again. However, Ali stated that according to him, Padukone suited the role of the new leading lady and he could not cast Kapoor wrongly. Kapoor after watching the film however, now says that Padukone was the perfect choice for the role.

Rishi Kapoor was cast to play the older Veer. Brazilian actress Giselli Monteiro auditioned for the role of Jai's girlfriend, but was cast to play Harleen, after Ali failed to find anyone suitable for the role. Neetu Kapoor, was cast in a special appearance as older Harleen, marking her return to cinema after a 25-years long hiatus. Rahul Khanna was later cast as Meera's husband, Vikram.

=== Filming ===
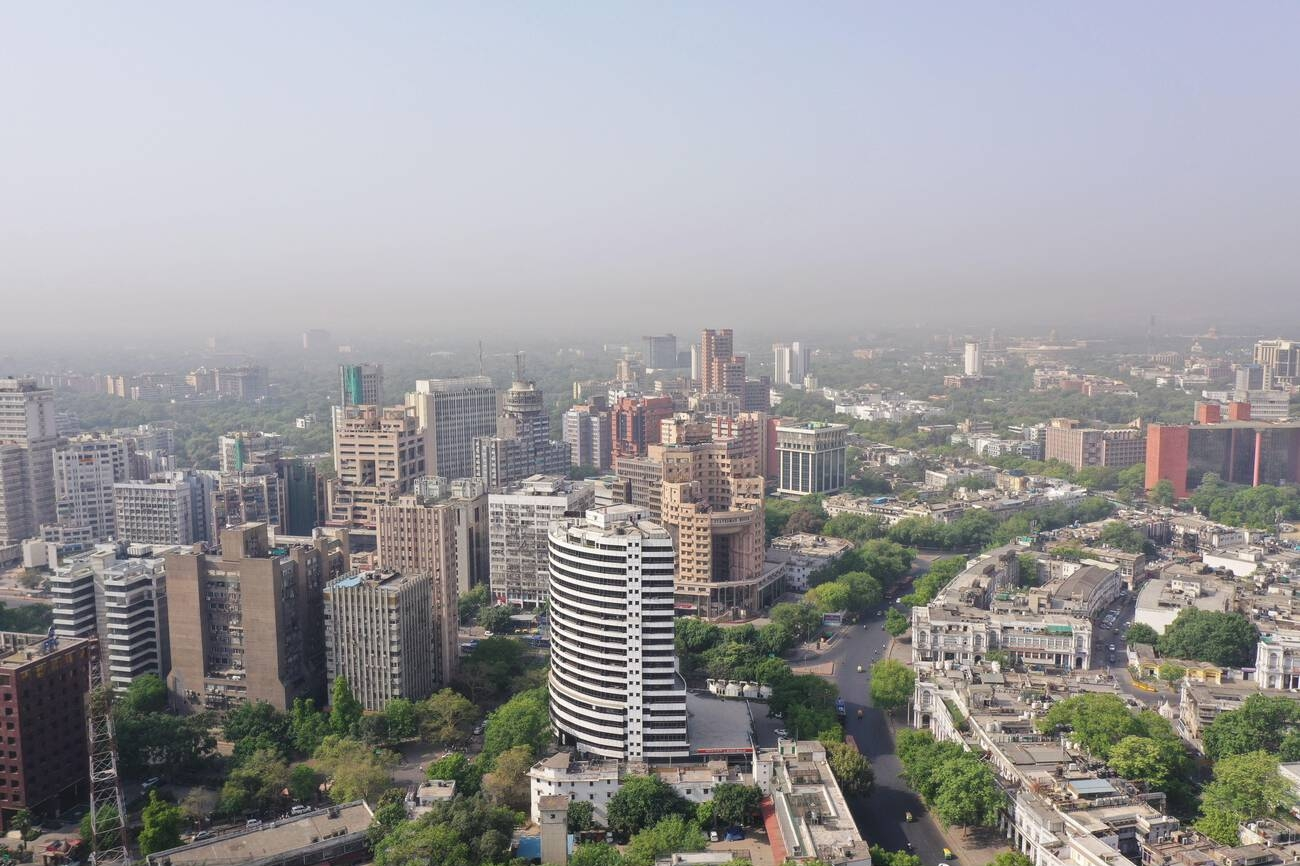
Delhi, where the film was mainly shot

The shooting of Love Aaj Kal started in May 2008. It was mainly shot at the Red Fort, Purana Qila and on the streets and other parts of Delhi. Few scenes were also shot at the railway station of Patiala, in London, San Francisco, and Kolkata. The building used as Golden Gate, Inc., in the film is actually the rotunda of San Jose City Hall. The film was not given a title until January 2009, till the shooting was complete.

== Soundtrack ==
The soundtrack of Love Aaj Kal was composed by Pritam Chakraborty and Salim–Sulaiman, with the former composing the songs and the latter the score. The lyrics for the songs were penned by Irshad Kamil, and the remixes created by DJ Sanj. The song "Twist" samples "Man Dole", composed by Hemant Kumar for Nagin (1954). The album earned Pritam his first IIFA Award for Best Music Director, in addition to a nomination for the Filmfare Award for Best Music Director.

Pritam revealed in a 2014 interview that Imtiaz Ali wanted A. R. Rahman to compose the music of the film, but the latter was available only for his next, Rockstar (2011).

== Release ==
The producers of the film agreed to market tie-ups with 2009 ICC World Twenty20, Shoppers Stop and Bajaj Allianz Life Insurance. The apparel worn by the lead cast is exclusively available at Shoppers Stop. With Bajaj Allianz, they have a tie-up to share the special moments where they could win a chance to meet the lead actor Saif Ali Khan, the protagonist and the producer of the film. The tie-up with the 2009 ICC World Twenty20 was that both Khan and Padukone would be in England before the tournament begins, with Khan expected to commentate on matches for Indian television. ASTPL, an Indian software developer, also released a mobile video game based on the film. Love Aaj Kal was later made available on Amazon Prime Video.

== Reception ==
=== Critical reception ===
Love Aaj Kal received positive reviews upon release, with praise for its novel concept, story, screenplay, direction, dialogues, soundtrack, humor, costumes, cinematography and performances of the cast.

Taran Adarsh of Bollywood Hungama gave the film 4 stars out of 5, saying, "On the whole, Love Aaj Kal is for the young and romantic at heart. Sure, it's not perfect, but the terrific performances, melodious music and stirring emotional moments more than compensate for the hiccups." Nikhat Kazmi of Times of India gave the film 4 stars on a scale of 5, concluding that "Go watch it for its GenNow feel and its ekdum [sic] modern appeal." Sonia Chopra of Sify gave the film 3.5 stars out of 5, commenting that "With lilting music and characters you'll love, Imtiaz Ali, brings out one of the most romantic films in recent times. It's a love story of the aam junta, with a delicious contemporary edge. Go get your fill."

Shubhra Gupta of Indian Express gave the film 3 stars on a scale of 5, noting that "It's hard not to warm up to a film which is, at its core, likable. I just wish I could have liked it more." Aniruddha Guha of DNA India gave the film 3 stars out of 5, writing that "Though Love Aaj Kal may not quite be the film you expect it to be, it does not leave you feeling disappointed either. Watch it without too many expectations and you will come back smiling. And if you have wanted to ask someone out for a while, this film is the perfect ice-breaker."

Raja Sen of Rediff.com gave the film 2.5 stars on a scale of 5, stating that "Love Aaj Kal is a harmless, watchable film – sad because it could have been truly special. It has its moments in the first half, while the second half is an over-melodramatic drag." Rajeev Masand of CNN-IBN gave the film 2 stars out of 5, pointing that "The film, in the end, is ordinary stuff, watchable but never memorable like the director's previous efforts, the far-superior Socha Na Tha (2005) and Jab We Met. I'm going with two out of five and an average rating for Love Aaj Kal. It's like that plump mango you bite into only to discover it's not ripe yet. Watch it nevertheless for the sharp dialogue and some clever humor."

=== Box office ===
After a bumper opening, Love Aaj Kal netted ₹428.7 million (US$4.5 million) in its first week and ₹164 million (US$1.7 million) in its second week. The film netted ₹665 million (US$6.9 million) in India. Love Aaj Kal was declared a hit by Box Office India, grossing ₹892 million (US$9.3 million). It grossed ₹1.19 billion worldwide and was one of the highest grossing films of the year.

== Awards and nominations ==
List of accolades received by Love Aaj Kal
Accolades
Award	Won	Nominated
Filmfare Awards	2	12
International Indian Film Academy Awards	3	12
Producers Guild Film Awards	5	16
Screen Awards	4	14
Stardust Awards	2	7
- Total number of awards and nominations (Note: Awards in certain categories do not have prior nominations and only winners are announced by the jury. For simplification and to avoid errors, each award in this list has been presumed to have had a prior nomination.)
Total	16	60
- References

Award	Date of ceremony (Note: Date is linked to the article about the awards held that year, wherever possible.)	Category	Recipient(s)	Result	Ref.
Filmfare Awards	27 February 2010	Best Film	Saif Ali Khan & Dinesh Vijan	Nominated	
Filmfare Awards	27 February 2010	Best Director	Imtiaz Ali	Nominated	
Filmfare Awards	27 February 2010	Best Story	Imtiaz Ali	Nominated	
Filmfare Awards	27 February 2010	Best Screenplay	Imtiaz Ali	Nominated	
Filmfare Awards	27 February 2010	Best Dialogue	Imtiaz Ali	Nominated	
Filmfare Awards	27 February 2010	Best Actor	Saif Ali Khan	Nominated	
Filmfare Awards	27 February 2010	Best Actress	Deepika Padukone	Nominated	
Filmfare Awards	27 February 2010	Best Music Director	Pritam	Nominated	
Filmfare Awards	27 February 2010	Best Lyricist	Irshad Kamil for "Aaj Din Chadheya"	Won	
Filmfare Awards	27 February 2010	Best Male Playback Singer	Rahat Fateh Ali Khan for "Aaj Din Chadheya"	Nominated	
Filmfare Awards	27 February 2010	Best Female Playback Singer	Sunidhi Chauhan for "Chor Bazaari"	Nominated	
Filmfare Awards	27 February 2010	Best Choreography	Bosco–Caesar for "Chor Bazaari"	Won	
International Indian Film Academy Awards	5 June 2010	Best Film	Love Aaj Kal	Nominated	
International Indian Film Academy Awards	5 June 2010	Best Director	Imtiaz Ali	Nominated	
International Indian Film Academy Awards	5 June 2010	Best Story	Imtiaz Ali	Nominated	
International Indian Film Academy Awards	5 June 2010	Best Screenplay	Imtiaz Ali	Nominated	
International Indian Film Academy Awards	5 June 2010	Best Dialogue	Imtiaz Ali	Nominated	
International Indian Film Academy Awards	5 June 2010	Best Actor	Saif Ali Khan	Nominated	
International Indian Film Academy Awards	5 June 2010	Best Actress	Deepika Padukone	Nominated	
International Indian Film Academy Awards	5 June 2010	Best Supporting Actor	Rishi Kapoor	Nominated	
International Indian Film Academy Awards	5 June 2010	Best Music Director	Pritam	Won	
International Indian Film Academy Awards	5 June 2010	Best Lyricist	Irshad Kamil for "Aaj Din Chadheya"	Nominated	
International Indian Film Academy Awards	5 June 2010	Best Male Playback Singer	Rahat Fateh Ali Khan for "Aaj Din Chadheya"	Nominated	
International Indian Film Academy Awards	5 June 2010	Best Female Playback Singer	Sunidhi Chauhan for "Chor Bazaari"	Nominated	
International Indian Film Academy Awards	5 June 2010	Best Choreography	Bosco–Caesar for "Chor Bazaari"	Won	
International Indian Film Academy Awards	5 June 2010	Best Costume Design	Anaita Shroff Adajania & Dolly Ahluwalia	Won	
Producers Guild Film Awards	8 January 2010	Best Film	Love Aaj Kal	Nominated	
Producers Guild Film Awards	8 January 2010	Best Director	Imtiaz Ali	Nominated	
Producers Guild Film Awards	8 January 2010	Best Story	Imtiaz Ali	Won	
Producers Guild Film Awards	8 January 2010	Best Screenplay	Imtiaz Ali	Nominated	
Producers Guild Film Awards	8 January 2010	Best Dialogue	Imtiaz Ali	Nominated	
Producers Guild Film Awards	8 January 2010	Best Actor in a Leading Role	Saif Ali Khan	Nominated	
Producers Guild Film Awards	8 January 2010	Best Actress in a Leading Role	Deepika Padukone	Nominated	
Producers Guild Film Awards	8 January 2010	Chevrolet Heartbeat of the Nation (Female)	Deepika Padukone	Won	
Producers Guild Film Awards	8 January 2010	Best Actor in a Supporting Role	Rishi Kapoor	Won	
Producers Guild Film Awards	8 January 2010	Best Music Director	Pritam	Won	
Producers Guild Film Awards	8 January 2010	Best Lyricist	Irshad Kamil for "Twist"	Nominated	
Producers Guild Film Awards	8 January 2010	Best Male Playback Singer	Mohit Chauhan for "Yeh Dooriyaan"	Won	
Producers Guild Film Awards	8 January 2010	Best Female Playback Singer	Sunidhi Chauhan for "Chor Bazaari"	Nominated	
Producers Guild Film Awards	8 January 2010	Best Choreography	Bosco–Caesar for "Chor Bazaari"	Nominated	
Producers Guild Film Awards	8 January 2010	Best Costume Design	Anaita Shroff Adajania & Dolly Ahluwalia	Nominated	
Producers Guild Film Awards	8 January 2010	Best Production Design	Teddy Maurya	Nominated	
Screen Awards	9 January 2010	Best Film	Love Aaj Kal	Nominated	
Screen Awards	9 January 2010	Best Director	Imtiaz Ali	Nominated	
Screen Awards	9 January 2010	Best Story	Imtiaz Ali	Won	
Screen Awards	9 January 2010	Best Screenplay	Imtiaz Ali	Nominated	
Screen Awards	9 January 2010	Best Dialogue	Imtiaz Ali	Nominated	
Screen Awards	9 January 2010	Best Actor	Saif Ali Khan	Nominated	
Screen Awards	9 January 2010	Best Actress	Deepika Padukone	Nominated	
Screen Awards	9 January 2010	Best Supporting Actor	Rishi Kapoor	Won	
Screen Awards	9 January 2010	Best Female Debut	Giselli Monteiro	Nominated	
Screen Awards	9 January 2010	Best Music Director	Pritam	Nominated	
Screen Awards	9 January 2010	Best Lyricist	Irshad Kamil for "Chor Bazaari"	Won	
Screen Awards	9 January 2010	Best Male Playback Singer	Rahat Fateh Ali Khan for "Aaj Din Chadheya"	Won	
Screen Awards	9 January 2010	Best Editing	Aarti Bajaj	Nominated	
Screen Awards	9 January 2010	Best Sound Design	Dileep Subramanian	Nominated	
Stardust Awards	17 January 2010	Best Film of the Year	Love Aaj Kal	Nominated	
Stardust Awards	17 January 2010	Hottest Film of The Year	Love Aaj Kal	Won	
Stardust Awards	17 January 2010	Dream Director	Imtiaz Ali	Won	
Stardust Awards	17 January 2010	Star of the Year – Male	Saif Ali Khan	Nominated	
Stardust Awards	17 January 2010	Superstar of Tomorrow – Female	Deepika Padukone	Nominated	
Stardust Awards	17 January 2010	Exciting New Face	Giselli Monteiro	Nominated	
Stardust Awards	17 January 2010	New Musical Sensation – Male	Mohit Chauhan for "Yeh Dooriyaan"	Nominated	

== Remake and spiritual successor ==
Love Aaj Kal was remade in Tollywood in 2011 titled Teen Maar starring Pawan Kalyan, Trisha Krishnan and Kriti Kharbanda reprising the roles of Saif Ali Khan, Deepika Padukone and Giselli Monteiro.

A spiritual successor of the same name, also directed by Ali, was released in 2020, starring Kartik Aaryan and Sara Ali Khan.

== Legacy ==
Love Aaj Kal remains one of the most popular romantic comedy-dramas of Hindi cinema. It is cited as a milestone in Ali, Khan and Padukone's career. Khan and Padukone's performance has been noted as one of their most notable works.

Comparing the film with its reboot version, Nairita Mukherjee of India Today stated, "Love Aaj Kal was ahead of its time. It isn't Imtiaz Ali's best but the film had more character and depth than the 2020 version can ever hope to achieve." She praised the film for showing the characters "prioritise career over love", a rarity in Bollywood. Utkarsh Mani Tripathi from Vogue praised the film and noted, "Imtiaz Ali has portrayed romance in less upper-class settings, to be sure, but rarely has he been more relatable and prophetic."
