= Elham (film) =

Indian Hindi language film

- Film's poster
- Directed by: Dhruva Harsh
- Written by: Dhruva Harsh
- Screenplay by: Dhruva Harsh
- Story by: Dhruva Harsh
- Produced by: Raj Kishore Khaware; Utpaal Acharya; Vickey Prasad; Shivraj Khaware; Vikas Yadav; Rati Tandon
- Starring: Taiyo Chan; Tot Chan; Mahmood Hashmi; Gunnit Kaur
- Cinematography: Ankur Rai
- Edited by: Surya Kant Verma
- Music by: Vickey Prasad
- Production companies: Content Engineers; Jungle Boy Entertainment
- Release date: January 2023 (Dhaka International Film Festival)
- Running time: 90 minutes
- Country: India
- Languages: Hindi; Awadhi

Elham (transl. Revelation) is a 2023 Indian Hindi-language film written and directed by Dhruva Harsh. The film explores the relationship between a young boy and a goat, set against the backdrop of Eid-al-Adha, a festival in India and South Asia.

Elham has been selected for multiple international film festivals, including the 24th Rainbow International Film Festival in London and the 21st Dhaka International Film Festival. It had its Asian premiere at the Jagran Film Festival in New Delhi in December 2024.

== Plot ==
Elham follows Faizan, a 6 or 7-year-old boy from a modest Muslim family who performs well in school but struggles with mathematics. As Eid al-Adha (Bakrid) approaches, he, like other children, wishes for a sacrificial goat but is mindful of his family's financial situation. His father, a cotton carder, eventually brings home a goat for the ritual. However, Faizan forms a deep bond with the animal, seeing it as a companion rather than a sacrifice. A Sufi mystic, inspired by Ibn Arabi, helps him navigate his emotions and understand faith, love, and sacrifice.

As the festival approaches, Faizan becomes determined to protect his beloved goat, Dodu, experiencing a quiet yet deeply moving journey of compassion and resilience. The story is set in the village of Dariyabad in Barabanki district, located in the Awadh region of Uttar Pradesh.

== Cast ==
- Taiyo Chan as Fatima
- Tot Chan as Faizan
- Mahmood Hashmi as Rafique
- Gunnit Kaur as Safina
- Umesh Shukla as grandparent
- Tarun Shukla as Hermit

== Production ==
Elham is produced by Raj Kishore Khaware, Utpaal Acharya, Vickey Prasad, Shivraj Khaware, Vikas Yadav and Rati Tandon. The cinematography is by Ankur Rai, with editing by Surya Kant Verma. The film's music is composed by Vickey Prasad. The film was produced under the banner of Content Engineers and Jungle Boy Entertainment. It is a Hindi-language film but also incorporates dialogues in the Awadhi dialect.

The film is inspired by the director's childhood experiences and his exposure to Korean cinema, particularly Kim Ki-duk's Spring, Summer, Fall, Winter... and Spring.

== Release ==
Elham premiered at the 21st Dhaka International Film Festival in Bangladesh in January 2023. The film was screened on 28 May 2024, at the Rainbow International Film Festival. In India, it was screened at the Kolkata International Children's Film Festival at Nandan-1 on 22 January 2024.

The film was an official selection and was screened at the 10th International Film Festival of Shimla in August 2024 at Gaiety Heritage Cultural Complex, Shimla.

The film made its Asia premiere at the Jagran Film Festival at Siri Fort Auditorium, New Delhi in December 2024. It was screened at the Jagran Film Festival across multiple cities, including Delhi, Prayagraj, Raipur, and Agra.

The film Elham had a special screening at Aligarh Muslim University on 28 February 2025.

== Reception ==
The film received generally positive reception, with critics noting its depiction of childhood innocence and its exploration of faith and tradition. Anuj Kumar of The Hindu noted that Elham carries an old-world innocence often missing in contemporary children's cinema. Rama Shanker Singh, in a review published in The Wire, remarked on the film's artistic depth and visual composition, observing, "Elham stands out for its artistic subtleties and stunning visual appeal."

Film critic Manish Jaisal, writing for Hindi daily newspaper, Subah Savere, described the film as a rare and noteworthy film centered on childhood, calling it a "milestone in Indian cinema". While he felt Mehmood Hashmi's performance as Faizan's father could have been stronger, he praised Guneet Kaur's portrayal of Faizan’s mother.

Hindustan Times noted that Toyo Chan and his real-life sister, Tot Chan, convincingly portrayed Faizan and Fatima despite their Buddhist background. Avdhesh Mallick of The Free Press Journal described Elham as an attempt to "revive" the genre of children's cinema and praised the director's approach.

In January 2023, Elham was selected for the Dhaka International Film Festival in Bangladesh as India's official entry and was the only children's film among the three selected from the country.

In May 2023, it was selected for screening at the Rainbow International Film Festival in London, where it was the only Indian children's film featured. In December 2024, the film was chosen as the opening feature of the 11th Kolkata International Children's Film Festival.

== See also ==
- List of Hindi films of 2025
- List of Hindi films of 2024
