= Vinod Nagpal =

Indian actor and classical singer

- Born: 26 September 1940 (age 86); Lahore, Punjab, British India
- Occupations: Actor; classical singer
- Years active: 1980–present
- Spouse: Kavita Nagpal (died)

Vinod Nagpal is an Indian film, stage and television actor and a trained classical singer, who mainly works in Hindi cinema. He has appeared in movies, mostly as a character actor.

== Career ==
He made his screen debut with Chashme Buddoor (1981). He is best known for his portrayal of Basesar Ram in the first Indian television serial Hum Log (1984). After his big breakthrough with Hum Log, he appeared in many commercially and critically acclaimed films like Naache Mayuri (1986), Bhrashtachar (1989), Paappi Devataa (1995), Dance of the Wind (1997), Tarkieb (2000), Khosla Ka Ghosla (2006), Aaja Nachle (2007), Luv Shuv Tey Chicken Khurana (2012), Pink (2016), Blue Mountains (2017), Jolly LLB 2 (2017) and Manto (2018).

Despite Hindi films, Nagpal has appeared in five English language films and in an English television show like The Perfect Murder (1988), The Curse of King Tut's Tomb (2006), The Last Days of the Raj (2007), The Cheetah Girls: One World (2008), Tigers (2014) and The Far Pavilions (1984).

In 2008, he played the lead role in a short film named Good Night, which was written and directed by Geetika Narang. It won many accolades including Best Short Film Award at the MIAAC Film Festival in United States.

He is also a trained classical singer. He has performed many songs in theatre. In July 2006, he performed marathi theatre songs with his troupe on the occasion of silver jubilee celebration of Natya Shodh Sansthan at Shishir Manch.

== Personal life ==
Vinod Nagpal has been married to Kavita Nagpal. She was a theatre critic, director and writer, she used to write in Hindustan Times and also in Asian Age occasionally. She had also directed and written plays. She also directed her husband (Vinod) in one of her plays. She died on 23 November 2021.

Nagpal was a very good friend to director Mani Kaul.

== Filmography ==
=== Films ===
Year	Film	Role	Notes
1981	Chashme Buddoor	Music Instructor	
1986	Karma	Tripathi Ji	
1986	Naache Mayuri	Advocate Gyaneshwar Prasad	
1987	Janjaal		
1988	The Perfect Murder	Minister	English film
1989	Paap Ki Sazaa		
1989	Adhuri Zindagi		
1989	Bhrashtachar	Ronak Lal	
1990	Police Public	Mantri	
1991	Begunaah	Rajan's chacha	
1995	Paappi Devataa	Pandu	
1997	Dance of the Wind	Mr. Thakkar	
2000	Tarkieb	Chandrakant Chaubey	
2005	Main, Meri Patni Aur Woh	Advocate Kishori Lal Mishra	
2006	The Curse of King Tut's Tomb	Dr. Hassan	English film
2006	Khosla Ka Ghosla	Sahni Saab	
2007	The Last Days of the Raj	Tara Singh	English film
2007	Chhodon Naa Yaar		
2007	Aaja Nachle	Mr. Shrivastav	
2008	Good Night	Madan Mohan Khullar	Short film
2008	The Cheetah Girls: One World	Swami Ji	English film
2009	Coffee House	Jarnail Singh	
2012	Luv Shuv Tey Chicken Khurana	Daar Ji	
2014	Tigers	Mustafa	English film
2016	Pink	Kasturi Lal (Landlord)	
2017	Jolly LLB 2	Zahoor Siddiqui	
2017	Blue Mountains	Guru Ji	
2018	Manto	Bishan Singh	
2018	The Great Freedom Fighter Lokmanya Bal Gangadhar Tilak	Firozshah Mehta	
2018	Namaste England	Sam's Grandfather	
2023	Gulmohar	Baba, Arun's biological father	
2023	Sukhee	Sukhee's grand father-in-law	
2026	Main Vaapas Aaunga	Kitpal	

=== Television ===
Year	Show	Role
1984	The Far Pavilions	Gobind Dass
1984-1985	Hum Log	Basesar Ram
1987-1988	Buniyaad	Shyamlal
1990-91	Lekhu	Lekhu's Father
1993-1994	Chere Pe Chera	

=== Web-Series ===
Year	Show	Role
2026	Pritam and Pedro	Dada Ji
