= Pranaam Walekum =

Unreleased Indian film

Pranam Walekum
- Directed by: Sanjay Mishra
- Produced by: Bhushan Sharma; Sandip Kapoor
- Starring: Irrfan Khan; Giselli Monteiro; Shilpa Shukla; Vindu Dara Singh
- Music by: Amit Mishra
- Country: India
- Language: Hindi

Pranam Walekum is an unreleased Hindi-language film which is the maiden directorial venture of the award-winning actor Sanjay Mishra with Giselli Monteiro, Shilpa Shukla, Vindu Dara Singh, Tia Singh on the leads along with Irrfan Khan in a cameo. It is produced under Khushi Motion Pictures and expected to be released by the end of 2015. According to Sanjai Mishra, the film is about a society which is losing innocence and simplicity.

== Synopsis ==
Set in a remote society, the movie is all about the chaos and confusion as a result of a group of people's increased interest in subjects that don't belong to them. The movie focus on a society which lacks innocence and simplicity.

== Cast ==
- Irrfan Khan
- Giselli Monteiro
- Shilpa Shukla
- Vijay Raaz
- Tia Singh
- Manu Rishi
- Sanjay Mishra
- Manoj Pahwa
- Vindu Dara Singh

== Production ==
Pranam Walekum is produced by Bhushan Sharma and Sandiip Kapur. Hitting the floors in the early 2011, the movie is delayed due to many reasons. According to the crew, the movie can be placed in the off beat genre & intellectual cinema. Director stated that the movie is similar to the art film movement of 1970's but a different and refreshing take. The movie also marks the debut of the popular Delhi based model Tia Singh who is going to play a mentally challenged girl. The shooting happened mostly at Maharashtra, Delhi and Gurgaon. Irrfan Khan was roped into the film for doing a cameo. The movie also had to face objections from the Delhi Development Authority because of lacking proper permission for shooting.
