= Good Night (2008 film) =

- Directed by: Geetika Narang
- Written by: Geetika Narang
- Produced by: Geetika Narang; Yasir Abbasi
- Starring: Vinod Nagpal; Shivam Pradhan; Manish Narang; Abhijeet Banerjee
- Cinematography: Yasir Abbasi
- Music by: Ashhar Farooqui
- Release date: 27 April 2008
- Running time: 30 minutes
- Country: India
- Language: Hindi

Good Night is a short film directed by Indian director Geetika Narang. The film is about Madan Mohan Khullar, played by Vinod Nagpal, and his quest for a song – the lyrics of which he can remember only partially.

The story of the film spans a single night in the life of Khullar who is fond of staying awake during nights. He is a music aficionado, and is constantly at loggerheads with his young domestic help Ratan (played by Shivam Pradhan).

== Awards ==
- Best Short Film Award – MIAAC Film Festival, USA (2009)
- Best Short Film Award – India International Women Film Festival (2008)
- Silver Lamp Tree Award – International Film Festival of India (2008)
- Best Cinematography Award – Fulmarxx Shorts Fest, India (2008)
- Certificate of Merit for Best Short Film – IDPA Awards, India (2009)

== Reviews ==
- Reel Reviews
- Doctor Flix
- Films De France
- Daily Info
- Independent Film Reviews
- Movies Online
