= Bestseller (TV series) =

2022 Hindi suspense thriller web series

- Genre: Suspense thriller
- Based on: The Bestseller She Wrote by Ravi Subramanian
- Written by: Anvita Dutt; Althea Kaushal
- Directed by: Mukul Abhayankar
- Starring: Mithun Chakraborty; Shruti Haasan; Arjan Bajwa; Gauhar Khan; Sonalee Kulkarni; Satyajeet Dubey
- Music by: Raju Singh
- Country of origin: India
- Original language: Hindi
- No. of seasons: 1
- No. of episodes: 8

Production
- Producer: Siddharth Malhotra
- Cinematography: Sameer Arya
- Editor: Shachindra Vats
- Production company: Alchemy Production LLP

Original release
- Network: Amazon Prime Video
- Release: 18 February 2022 – present

Bestseller is an Indian Hindi-language television series based on Ravi Subramanian's 2015 novel The Bestseller She Wrote. It is written by Anvita Dutt, along with Althea Kaushal, directed by Mukul Abhayankar, and produced by Siddharth Malhotra under the Alchemy Production LLP banner. Starring Mithun Chakraborty, Shruti Haasan, Arjan Bajwa, Gauhar Khan, Sonalee Kulkarni and Satyajeet Dubey in main roles, the series premiered on Amazon Prime Video on 18 February 2022.

== Cast ==
=== Main ===
- Mithun Chakraborty as Lokesh Pramanik
- Shruti Haasan as Meetu Mathur
- Arjan Bajwa as Tahir Wazir
- Gauhar Khan as Mayanka Kapoor
- Sonalee Kulkarni as Urmila Ranade
- Satyajeet Dubey as Parth Acharya
- Viraf Patel as Sanjay Ahekhawat
- Suchitra Pillai as Sukanya
- Ivan Rodrigues as DCP Mehrotra
- Vaishnavi Karmarkar as Shalu
- Lalita Amrutkar as Savita

== Reception ==
Bestseller was released to mixed reviews with many criticizing the writing and direction, though the lead actors received a lot of praise for their performance.

Iraa Paul of DNA gave 2 stars and stated "The storyline is good and the execution is decent. Even when it goes into flashback, the series makes sense because of engaging dialogues and connected sequences. The psychological thriller will keep you wanting more every minute giving you a nail-biting experience."

Shefali Deshpande of The Quint gave the movie, a rating of 1.5 out of 5, criticizing the writing and direction "It is slow, boring, looks and feels like multiple short films stitched together, and has character storylines that go nowhere. The show does pick up the story from the book but dilutes it and misses the chance to add visual depth, texture, colour, sound, and direction to make a pulpy piece with juice and ripeness. Even paper-thin stories can be worked on and bettered if used just as a blueprint."

Reviewing the series in NDTV, Saibal Chatterjee wrote "Bestseller, eight chapters of unmitigated ennui, isn't the streaming equivalent of a racy, engrossing bestseller." Rohan Naahar gave the series just half of one star out of five, calling it a pure junk.

Subham Kulkarni of Koimoi gave 2 stars, stating "Bestseller is a show that could have been a brilliant thriller/Revenge drama, but the makers were too confused to shape it into one thing."
