= Goodnight (surname) =

Goodnight is a surname. Notable people with the surname include:

- Charles Goodnight (1836–1929), 19th century American cattle baron
- Clarence J. Goodnight (1914–1987), American zoologist
- G. Thomas Goodnight, American argumentation and rhetorical scholar
- Isaac Goodnight (1849–1901), American politician from Kentucky
- James Goodnight, American businessman
- Owen Goodnight (1917–1967), American football player

== Fictional characters ==
- Mary Goodnight, a character in James Bond novels and films
