= Always Kabhi Kabhi =

2011 film by Roshan Abbas

- Theatrical release poster
- Directed by: Roshan Abbas
- Screenplay by: Ishita Moitra
- Story by: Ranjit Raina
- Produced by: Gauri Khan; Shah Rukh Khan
- Starring: Ali Fazal; Giselli Monteiro; Zoa Morani; Harsh Nagar; Satyajeet Dubey
- Music by: Pritam Chakraborty; Aashish Rego; Shree D
- Production company: Red Chillies Entertainment
- Distributed by: Eros Entertainment
- Release date: 17 June 2011 (India)
- Running time: 126 minutes
- Country: India
- Language: Hindi

Always Kabhi Kabhi (transl. Always Sometimes) is a 2011 Indian romantic comedy film directed by Roshan Abbas and produced by Shah Rukh Khan under Red Chillies Entertainment. It stars Ali Fazal, Giselli Monteiro, Harsh Nagar, Zoa Morani, and Satyajeet Dubey with Satish Shah, Lilette Dubey, Vijay Raaz, Mukesh Tiwari, and Manoj Joshi playing supporting roles. It focuses on four teenagers embarking on a dramatic journey during their incident-packed final year at school.

The film was released on 17 June 2011.

== Plot ==
Always Kabhi Kabhi focuses on four students and their struggle through their final year at St. Mark's School. The first teenager is 'Shortcut Sam', Sameer Khanna, the jock, who falls in love with Aishwarya Dhawan, who is about to become a Bollywood actress. Aishwarya is a new student who befriends Sam on her first day, and the two fall in love at first sight. A Shakespeare play approaches in which Aish automatically gains the role of Juliet, much to the chagrin of her classmates. Sam tries his level best to learn the lines of Romeo so as to impress Mrs. Das and gain the role of Romeo. He succeeds in the end.

The next two friends, Tariq Naqvi and 'Nandy Bull' Nandini Oberoi, love to fight and argue with each other but do not understand that they are in love. Nandini's parents don't spend any time with her and are always travelling. In the absence of her parents, she goes to illegal clubs and parties every day and spends money lavishly. Tariq, on the other hand, is burdened by his parents to achieve their dream of studying at MIT.

They realise their love for each other during Nandy's struggle to get approval of her apology after she forwards Tariq's MIT denial letter, oblivious that he had not read it himself. Sam gives a party in Hellfire, but then there's a raid, and he gets arrested while saving Aish. The two corrupt policemen try to bag ₹50,000 from Sam. He tries his best to avoid the policemen and tries to pay them in instalments. Aish breaks up with him because when during the party, Nandy's toyboy offers him a drag, even though Aish begged him to leave, he agreed to smoke weed because the toyboy makes fun of him and asks him to be a man. After she heard that Sam had sacrificed himself to save her, they made up. During Aish's 18th birthday, Sam confesses his love for her only to be caught together by her mother, who disapproves of them. Her agent renames her Kashish for the films and even persuades her to do a photo shoot in which she only has to wear a bikini. When Sam finds out that the prize money of the inter-school Shakespeare play competition is ₹50,000 (the amount he owes the policemen), he begins to put more pressure on the group to come in time for the practices. Meanwhile, Aish is being offered a movie contract that she doesn't want to do. During a meeting, she rips the contract and runs to meet Sam and the others and continue their practice for the competition.

Enraged by Aish's absence during practice, Sam confronts her, oblivious to what she had done for him. Aish didn't know about the money he owes the policemen and does not understand the reason for his anger. She runs into the streets, distraught and crying, only to be hit by a car and go into a coma. Aishwarya's mother confronts Sam about the accident because she believes that he was the cause and does not permit him to see her. While dropping Aishwarya's clothes, Tariq and Nandy notice Aishwarya's phone has an electronic diary, and they read it. It shows her point of view about everyone in the group and talks about how their parents have pressurised them. So, they perform Romeo and Juliet with a different point of view, saying that Romeo and Juliet would not have died if their parents had approved of their love and listened to them, implying that their parents should do the same. They perform the song "Antenna" to convey their thoughts. Sameer uncovers the policemen's intentions to the Commissioner, while Aishwarya recovers and reconciles with him. Tariq gets into IIT and tries to make his father consider it the same as MIT, and Nandini tells her parents she does not want their money but their time.

The movie closes with Shahrukh Khan performing to a song with the protagonists.

== Cast ==
- Ali Fazal as Sameer Khanna (aka Sam)
- Giselli Monteiro as Aishwarya Dhawan (Aish)
- Zoa Morani as Nandini Oberoi (Nandy Bull)
- Satyajeet Dubey as Tariq Naqvi (Einstein)
- Satish Shah as Kenny G
- Lilette Dubey as Ms. Das
- Vijay Raaz as Professor Agarwal (Agro)
- Navneet Nishan as Mrs. Dhawan
- Manoj Joshi as Ranawat
- Mukesh Tiwari as Shekhawat
- Ashwin Mushran as Rahul Ghoshi
- Preetika Chawla as Sonia
- Shah Rukh Khan (Guest appearance in song "Antenna")
- Harsh Nagar
- Mansi Dovhal
- Apurva V. Dixit

== Soundtrack ==
Always Kabhi Kabhi

Soundtrack album by Pritam, Aashish Rego, Shree D
- Released: 13 May 2011
- Genre: Feature film soundtrack
- Label: T-Series
- Producer: Gauri Khan

Pritam chronology
Ready (2011)	Always Kabhi Kabhi (2011)	Mausam (2011)

The music is composed by Pritam Chakraborty, Aashish Rego and Shree D. Lyrics are penned by the film director Roshan Abbas, Amitabh Bhattacharya, Irfan Siddique and Prashant Pandey. The song "Antenna" had Shahrukh Khan as a special guest.

=== Track listing ===
No.	Title	Lyrics	Music	Singer(s)	Length
1.	"Always Kabhi Kabhi"	Roshan Abbas	Aashish Rego, Shree D	Harmeet Singh, Bhavin Dhanak, Sanah Moidutty	3:48
2.	"Antenna"	Amitabh Bhattacharya	Pritam Chakraborty	Benny Dayal, Roshan Abbas, Apeksha Dandekar	4:24
3.	"School Ke Din"	Prashant Pandey	Pritam Chakraborty	Suhail Kaul, Ishq Bector	4:09
4.	"Undi The Condi"	Irfan Siddiqui	Pritam Chakraborty	Shaan, Aditi Singh Sharma	3:41
5.	"Always Kabhi Kabhi" (Unplugged)	Roshan Abbas	Aashish Rego, Shree D	Vinnie Hutton, Apeksha Dandekar	4:38
6.	"Antenna" (Reloaded : SRK Mix)	Amitabh Bhattacharya, Shah Rukh Khan	Pritam Chakraborty	KK, Anupam Amod, Apeksha Dandekar	3:43
7.	"Better Not Mess With Me" (Club Mix)	Irfan Siddiqui	Pritam Chakraborty	Shefali Alvaris	3:08
8.	"Better Not Mess With Me" (Rock Mix)	Irfan Siddiqui	Pritam Chakraborty	Sunidhi Chauhan	3:25
9.	"Jaane Kyun" (Soul Version)	Irfan Siddiqui, Roshan Abbas	Pritam Chakraborty	Naresh Iyer	4:26
10.	"Jaane Kyun" (Sufi Version)	Irfan Siddiqui, Roshan Abbas	Pritam Chakraborty	Shafqat Amanat Ali	4:07

== Reception ==
=== Critical reception ===
Always Kabhi Kabhi opened to negative reviews from critics. Taran Adarsh of Bollywood Hungama rated the film with one and a half stars out of five saying, "Always Kabhi Kabhi disappoints!". Rajeev Masand of CNN-IBN also gave the film 1.5 stars and stated, "Watching this film is like attending a concert put up by ten-year-olds. It's amateurish, and tedious to sit through, and the only thing you can appreciate in the end is the earnestness behind the effort." Nikhat Kazmi of the Times of India awarded two and a half stars saying, "First, and most importantly, the film is a youth-oriented story but completely lacks the fun and games that are associated with this generation. Secondly, the parental problems are all so very predictable. It's all foregone and predictable apart from being inordinately long. School is agony; school is ecstasy. Always Kabhi Kabhi captures neither and treads the staid middle ground."

=== Box office ===
Always Kabhi Kabhi had a net gross of ₹30.5 million (equivalent to ₹69 million or US$710,000 in 2026) in India by the end of theatrical run. It was declared a flop by Box Office India In the overseas, the film grossed $21,381 from the United States, $46,469 from the UK, $9,803 from South Africa and $2,893 from Malaysia.
