= Satyajeet Dubey =

Indian actor (born 1990)

- Dubey in 2026
- Born: 21 July 1990 (age 36); Bilaspur, Chhattisgarh, India
- Occupation: Actor
- Years active: 2011–present
- Works: Full list

Satyajeet Dubey(born 21 July 1990) is an Indian actor who works in Hindi-language films and television. He made his feature film debut as Tariq Naqvi in the romantic comedy film Always Kabhi Kabhi (2011), directed by Roshan Abbas and produced by Red Chillies Entertainment. His subsequent film appearances include Baankey Ki Crazy Baraat (2015), Kerry on Kutton (2016), Prassthanam (2019) and Aye Zindagi (2022).

Dubey grew up in Bilaspur, Chhattisgarh, and moved to Mumbai in 2007 to pursue a career in acting. During his early years in Mumbai, he undertook various jobs while attending auditions and seeking opportunities in television and films. He also participated in theatre-related activities before obtaining acting roles. His early television work included an appearance in the historical drama series Jhansi Ki Rani. He made his feature film debut with Always Kabhi Kabhi, which was released in 2011. He subsequently appeared in the television film Luck Luck Ki Baat (2012) and the comedy film Baankey Ki Crazy Baraat (2015).

In 2016, Dubey appeared in the film Kerry on Kutton. He later portrayed Vivaan Singh in the political drama film Prassthanam (2019), directed by Deva Katta. He also appeared in the television comedy series Maharaj Ki Jai Ho! (2020). In 2021, he played Dr Ahaan Mirza in the medical drama series Mumbai Diaries 26/11, directed by Nikkhil Advani and released on Amazon Prime Video. He subsequently portrayed Parth Acharya in the thriller series Bestseller (2022) and appeared in the film Aye Zindagi (2022) as Vinayak Chawla. He reprised his role as Dr Ahaan Mirza in the second season of Mumbai Diaries (2023) and appeared in the streaming series Ranneeti: Balakot & Beyond (2024).

In 2025, Dubey appeared as Dhruv in the romantic drama series Pyaar Testing, released on ZEE5. In 2026, he appeared in the film Simulacra as Nayan and portrayed Kabir Bharadwaj in the romantic drama series Ishqa Ishqa, which premiered on Amazon Prime Video on 7 October 2026.

== Early life ==
Satyajeet Dubey grew up in Bilaspur, Chhattisgarh, India. His father was a teacher, and his grandmother was a school principal. Dubey lost his father when he was 12 years old and was subsequently brought up by his grandmother. In an interview with Outlook Hindi, he recalled participating in stage performances during his childhood and said that his family encouraged his interest in performing arts.

Dubey moved to Mumbai in 2007 to pursue acting. During his early years in the city, he undertook various jobs to support himself while attending auditions. He also assisted theatre groups backstage, where he observed actors during rehearsals and performances. In a 2011 interview with The Indian Express, he said that he began assisting theatre groups at the age of 17 and learned by observing performers on stage.

His early work included an appearance in the television series Jhansi Ki Rani, which aired on Zee TV, and roles in television commercials.

In 2009, Dubey was selected to play Tariq Naqvi in the romantic comedy film Always Kabhi Kabhi, directed by Roshan Abbas. Shaheen Abbas, the director's wife, had noticed him while he was assisting a theatre group backstage and suggested that he be called for an audition. Dubey subsequently auditioned and was selected for the role. The film, produced by Red Chillies Entertainment, was released in 2011 and marked his feature film debut.

== Career ==
=== 2009–2016: Television debut and early film roles ===
Dubey began his professional career with television appearances and advertising assignments. His early television work included the historical drama series Jhansi Ki Rani, in which he portrayed Nana Saheb. In 2009, he was selected for the role of Tariq Naqvi in Always Kabhi Kabhi, a high school drama directed by Roshan Abbas and produced by Red Chillies Entertainment. The film was released on 17 June 2011 and marked his feature film debut. It also featured Ali Fazal and Zoa Morani.

In interviews, Dubey described the period following his debut as one in which he continued attending auditions while looking for acting opportunities. He subsequently appeared in the television film Luck Luck Ki Baat (2012), playing Amit.

In 2015, he appeared in the comedy film Baankey Ki Crazy Baraat, directed by Aijaz Khan. He played two characters, Rajesh and Virat, in the film, which also starred Sanjay Mishra, Rajpal Yadav and Vijay Raaz.

In 2016, Dubey played the title character in the film Kerry on Kutton, directed by Ashok Yadav. The film was set in a small town in northern India and followed a group of young men and their experiences. Dubey later said that his performance in the film led to an opportunity to work in Prassthanam, after Sanjay Dutt and Maanayata Dutt watched the film and expressed interest in his work.

=== 2017–2020: Film roles and return to television ===
After Kerry on Kutton, Dubey continued to pursue film roles and auditions. In 2019, he appeared in the political drama Prassthanam, directed by Deva Katta and produced by Sanjay S. Dutt Productions. He portrayed Vivaan Singh, one of the principal antagonists in the story. The film also featured Jackie Shroff, Manisha Koirala and Ali Fazal.

In interviews about the film, Dubey discussed his preparation for the role and his experience of working with Sanjay Dutt. He described the character as different from the roles he had previously played.

In 2020, Dubey returned to television with the comedy series Maharaj Ki Jai Ho!, in which he played Sanjay Arora. The series, which aired on StarPlus, followed characters who travel between the present day and an ancient period. The role marked his return to television after several years of working primarily in films.

=== 2021–2024: Streaming projects and television work ===
In 2021, Dubey portrayed Dr Ahaan Mirza, a resident doctor, in the medical drama series Mumbai Diaries 26/11, created by Nikkhil Advani and released on Amazon Prime Video. Set during the 2008 Mumbai attacks, the series follows doctors, nurses and other hospital staff as they respond to the events. Dubey's character experiences impostor syndrome and struggles with his confidence as a medical professional.

In an interview with Mid-Day, Dubey discussed preparing for the role, including learning medical terminology and working with medical professionals who advised the cast. He also spoke about conveying aspects of the character through expressions and silences.

In 2022, he appeared in the thriller series Bestseller, directed by Mukul Abhyankar and released on Amazon Prime Video. He portrayed Parth Acharya, an advertising assistant involved in the story surrounding a novelist and an aspiring writer.

The same year, Dubey played Vinayak Chawla in the drama film Aye Zindagi, directed by Anirban Bose. The film follows a family dealing with a medical crisis and explores themes related to organ donation. Reviews of the film discussed Dubey's portrayal of the central character, particularly in its dramatic scenes.

In 2023, Dubey returned as Dr Ahaan Mirza in the second season of Mumbai Diaries. The season is set against the backdrop of the 2005 Mumbai floods and follows the hospital staff as they respond to the disaster. He reprised the role alongside several members of the original cast.

In 2024, he appeared in the streaming series Ranneeti: Balakot & Beyond, a military drama based on the events surrounding the 2019 Balakot airstrike. He portrayed Iqbal Dar in the series.

=== 2025–present: Recent projects ===
In 2025, Dubey played Dhruv in the romantic comedy series Pyaar Testing, directed by Shiva Varma and Saptaraj Chakraborty and released on ZEE5 on 14 February. The series follows two individuals who meet through an arranged-marriage proposal and decide to live together to assess their compatibility. Dubey appeared opposite Plabita Borthakur, who played Amrita.

In 2026, Dubey appeared in the science-fiction film Simulacra, directed by Pankaj Sawant, alongside Akshara Haasan and Rajdeep Choudhury. The film was released in India in July 2026. Dubey played Nayan, a character whose memories of a relationship are central to the story.

In October 2026, he appeared as Kabir Bharadwaj in the romantic drama series Ishqa Ishqa, released on Amazon Prime Video on 7 October. The series also stars Helly Shah and Anushka Kaushik. Its story follows Kabir, a writer whose past relationship becomes relevant to his present life.
