= Harshit (film) =

- Directed by: Dhruva Harsh
- Written by: Dhruva Harsh
- Produced by: Anil S. Soni; Surabhi Bhattacharjee; Dhruva Harsh; Ashutosh Srivastav
- Starring: Satyajeet Dubey; Diksha Juneja; Natasha Rana
- Cinematography: Ankur Rai
- Edited by: Surya Kant Verma
- Music by: Vickey Prasad
- Production companies: Soni Brothers Entertainment; Glorious Gonardh
- Distributed by: Disney+ Hotstar; Amazon Prime
- Release date: 2018
- Running time: 25 minutes
- Country: India
- Language: Hindi

Harshit is a Hindi-language short film written and directed by Dhruva Harsh. It was streamed on the OTT platform Disney+ Hotstar and Amazon Prime. The film features Satyajeet Dubey and Diksha Juneja in lead roles.

The film was produced by Soni Brothers Entertainment and Glorious Gonardh, and is inspired from William Shakespeare's The Tragedy of Hamlet.

Harshit was selected for film festivals such as the 16th Mindanao Film Festival (2018) in the Philippines, the Pondicherry International Film Festival (2018), the 4th International Film Festival of Shimla (2018), the 7th Delhi International Film Festival (2018) in New Delhi, and the 7th Smita Patil International Film Festival, Pune (2018). It was originally released in 2008. It began streaming on Amazon Prime on 20 August 2020.

== Plot ==
The film centres on Harshit (Satyajeet Dubey), a Hindu boy, and Rahila (Diksha Juneja), a young Muslim girl, who fall deeply in love. Despite intense scrutiny and disapproval from their families and friends, Harshit remains determined to formalise their relationship. As Rahila's family becomes increasingly aware of their relationship, tensions escalate and a series of tragic events unfolds, with disastrous consequences for the couple and those around them, including their friends and relatives.

== Cast ==
- Satyajeet Dubey as Harshit
- Shubham Chandna as Ravi
- Diksha Juneja as Rahila
- Abhishek Pandey as Kareem
- Natasha Rana as Manju
- Shiv Saroj as Shiv
- Bunty Chopra as Harshit's father
- Rajneesh Behl as Maulana

== Reception and recognition ==
Rajiv Mani of The Times of India writes, "The film manages to be an entertaining blend of Shakespeare's play, along with the layers of symbolism it contains, as well as a story heavily influenced by Indian culture."

Rouven Linnarz of Asian Movie Pulse, described the film as a "wonderful interpretation of its inspiration with exceptional performances." Reviewing the film for CinemadeinAsia, Jonny Blanco commended the film for incorporating essential elements of Shakespeare's work while adding a unique twist by depicting the ethnic and religious conflict between Hindus and Muslims in India.

In October 2018, the film was selected and screened at the 4th International Film Festival of Shimla, organized in collaboration with the Ministry of Information and Broadcasting and the Language Art and Culture Department of the Government of Himachal Pradesh. At the 2018 International Short Film Festival in Pune, Harshit secured the Best Film Award, with its director winning the Best Director's Award, and Satyajeet Dubey receiving the Best Actor Award.

=== Accolades ===
Year	Category	Institute	Result	Ref.
2018	Official Selection	Pondicherry International Film Festival	Won	
2018	Official Selection	Mindanao Film Festival	Won	
2018	Official Selection	International Film Festival of Shimla	Won	
2018	Best short film	National Short Film Festival, Kolkata	Won	
2018	Best screenplay	National Short Film Festival, Kolkata	Won	
2018	Official Selection	Smita Patil International Film Festival, Pune	Won	
2018	Best Director	International Short Film Festival, Pune	Won	
2018	Best 3rd film	International Short Film Festival, Pune	Won	
2019	Official Selection	Kolkata Short and Feature Film Festival	Won	
2019	Official Selection	Chambal International Film Festival	Won	
