= Goodnight, Oklahoma =

Unincorporated community in Oklahoma, US

Coordinates: 35°57′05″N 97°08′26″W

Goodnight is an unincorporated community in Logan and Payne counties, in the U.S. state of Oklahoma.

== History ==
Goodnight had its start in 1900 when the railroad was extended to that point. A post office was established at Goodnight in 1900, and remained in operation until 1949. The community has the name of Jake Goodnight, a pioneer citizen.
