= Aye Zindagi (film) =

- Theatrical release poster
- Directed by: Anirban Bose
- Written by: Anirban Bose
- Produced by: Shiladitya Bora
- Starring: Revathy; Satyajeet Dubey; Mrinmayee Godbole; Sawan Tank
- Cinematography: Surjodeep Ghosh
- Edited by: Suraj Gunjal
- Music by: Avijit Kundu; Surel Ingale
- Production company: Platoon One Films
- Release date: 14 October 2022
- Country: India
- Language: Hindi

Aye Zindagi (transl. Life finds a way) is a 2022 Indian Hindi-language drama film, based on a true story, written and directed by debutant Anirban Bose. Produced by Shiladitya Bora, the film stars Revathy, Satyajeet Dubey, Mrinmayee Godbole, Sawan Tank, and Hemant Kher in major roles. ‘Aye Zindagi’ had a theatrical release in India and North America on 14 October 2022. As of 2025, the film is available to stream on YouTube.

Based on the true story of Luv Dhody, Lalitha Raghuram, and Swamy Narayan, Aye Zindagi follows the journey of a 26-year-old liver cirrhosis patient Vinay Chawla whose unlikely bond with a hospital grief counsellor Revathi, rekindles his hope and faith in life and makes him believe in the power of humanity.

== Plot ==
Vinay Chawla after seeing an ad for a liver transplant in a Hyderabad hospital, goes there and meets Revathi Rajan unbeknownst to his family. Revathi works there as a counselor for families whose loved ones are brain dead and as a result, are able to donate their loved ones' organs. Manjula, a nurse, sees Vinay faint in the hallway and immediately calls for his treatment. Vinay has succumbed to severe liver cirrhosis and only recently found out in Delhi since he was constantly throwing up and saw a doctor.

At his work in Lucknow, Vinay's manager Sharma complains to his manager Pathak that Vinay has not been in the office for the whole week and that he constantly goes to the restroom while at work. Vinay's father told Vinay's brother, Kartik, about his condition since he is studying to be a doctor. Kartik comes down to Hyderabad with Vinay to learn more about the liver transplant after he too saw the ad in the newspaper. Vinay is confused where he will get 2 or 3 lakhs to pay for the transplant and Revathi suggests that they put an ad in the national newspaper. Kartik offers to care for Vinay 24/7 so that there will be no health issues at work and there will be no need to fire him. To pay for the liver transplant, Vinay's coworkers paid their month salary to the Vinay Chawla welfare fund.

While at the hospital, Vinay gets close with Manju, who was engaged to another man. One day, Kartik hears that another patient got priority for the liver donation before Vinay and he storms her office along with Vinay. Revathi tells Kartik that he has to understand medical decisions since he is a doctor himself. While in Revathi's office, her son Nandu calls her repeatedly and eventually comes to her office, which causes both Kartik and eventually Vinay to leave her office before she has to tell them what she wanted to say.

Vinay's trauma also affects Kartik as he almost wants to kill himself in an elevator after the head doctor Kapoor says that the liver donor has to be dead and that Kartik cannot donate his liver. One day, Kartik tells Vinay that they have a donor and takes him to the hospital. Kapoor tells Kartik that the liver donor was none other than Nandu, who died the previous night in a car accident and was declared brain dead.

After Vinay is done with the operation, he is unable to come with facts that Nandu died and donated his liver and feels like he is at fault for Nandu's death. As a result, he intentionally stops meeting Revathi due to his insecurities. Revathi also feels insecure and Kapoor lies that she is on vacation when Vinay tries to meet her before he leaves to Lucknow after Kartik and his father suggested he do so. After moving back to Lucknow, Vinay calls Manju daily but expressesing everything but his love for Manju. Little does he know that Manju's engagement broke off, which she never revealed to him.

After a chance meeting with Kapoor in the Hyderabad airport when Vinay was going to meet Manju, Vinay tells Kapoor that he will never express his love to Manju since he is going to only live for five more years (two years had passed and Kapoor had told him that some liver transplant patients only live for seven years). Vinay asks Kapoor if Manju was his daughter would he accept the marriage and Kapoor gives a definite yes, which instills confidence in Vinay to propose to Manju.

After the marriage with Manju is confirmed, Vinay writes a letter for Revathi to attend as a special guest to the wedding. While in Delhi, Manju tells Vinay that Revathi since she won't be able to make it. After seven years, Vinay goes to Chicago after being transferred there for work. There, Kapoor invites him as a special guest to talk about his experience as a liver transplant patient in India. Vinay feels insecure about giving a speech after he sees Revathi at the event. After Manju and Kapoor try to persuade him to continue with his speech, Vinay agrees only after Revathi herself comes up to him and apologises. Vinay tells her that she shouldn't be sorry and asked her why she didn't come for his marriage. Revathi told him that she didn't want to be the center of attention at his wedding. Vinay delivers the speech, which he centers around Nandu, and how he aspired to be Nandu since he was a nice, looking handsome guy who had a loving mother and didn't struggle to be alive (Vinay's mom died when he was fifteen). He thanks Nandu for giving him a new lease of life.

== Cast ==
- Revathy as Revathi Rajan
- Satyajeet Dubey as Vinayak "Vinay" Chawla
- Mrinmayee Godbole as Manjula "Manju" Nair
- Sawan Tank as Kartik Chawla
- Hemant Kher as Dr. Kapoor
- Shrikant Verma as Mr. Sharma
- Muskaan Agarwal as Arundhati Rajan
- Pranjal Trivedi as Nandan "Nandu" Raghu Rajan
- Mandeep Kumar as Mr. Pathak

== Reception ==
In his review, Dhaval Roy from The Times of India gave the film a four star rating and called the film a "bittersweet saga will tug at your heartstrings. A must watch.

Film critic Komal Nahta states in his review, "It’s a small film, this ‘Aye Zindagi. But it has a huge impact on the viewers." Komal also goes on to praise the technical departments of the film in his review.

In his review, Devesh Sharma from Filmfare wrote that Aye Zindagi, "Carries a powerful, affirmative message that really is the need of the hour."

Sonil Dedhia from the News18 network congratulated the team in his review - "A triumph for its cast, crew and for us, the audience... Aye Zindagi is a heartfelt experience which terrifies and touches...".

Navbharat Times's review stated that Aye Zindagi is, "A sensitively written and directed film, rich in emotion... All the actors give splendid performances."
