= Kerry on Kutton =

- Kerry on Kutton
- Directed by: Ashok Yadav
- Produced by: Shashank Shekhar Singh
- Starring: Satyajeet Dubey; Aditya Kumar; Aradhana Jagota; Deepraj Rana
- Production company: Trishank Entertainment Pvt. Ltd.
- Release date: 1 July 2016
- Running time: 125 minutes
- Country: India
- Language: Hindi

Kerry on Kutton is a 2016 Indian Hindi-language film directed by Ashok Yadav and produced by Shashank Shekhar Singh under Trishank Entertainment Pvt. Ltd. The film stars Satyajeet Dubey, Aditya Kumar, Aradhana Jagota, Shivam Pradhan and Karan Mahavar. It was released across India on 1 July 2016.

== Plot summary ==
Four teenage lives undergoing a distorted upbringing intertwine in India's small town Ballia, also known as the city of rebels, eventually leading themselves into the dark zone of crime. Among the four, Kerry's only ambition in life is to lose his virginity. Kadambari does not want to take over his family legacy of a Band Party and wants to become a millionaire by mating dogs just like Rajesh Chacha, all he has to do is steal a high breed puppy from Bade Babu and reach Rajesh Chacha. Suraj wants to gift a touch phone to his love Jyoti but cannot because of his miser father. Jyoti uses her beauty as a tool to blackmail her lovers to achieve her materialistic demands.

== Cast ==
- Satyajeet Dubey as Kerry
- Aditya Kumar as Kadambari
- Aradhana Jagota as Jyoti
- Deepraj Rana as Kerry's Father Laal Dhari
- Reecha Sharma as Jyoti's Mausi
- Tushar Bajpai as Transgender

== Reception ==
The film received mixed to positive reviews.

Suparna Sharma of the Deccan Chronicle and Asian Age praised the film, writing: "The film opens with one of the best making-out scenes I've seen in Hindi cinema. It's hurried, awkward and disastrous. It is the kind of film where the writers, director and actors have plugged into not just the characters, but also the circumstances they were born into, the place and, hence, their stories. This shines throughout Kerry on Kutton and it's no mean feat. Kerry on Kutton carries in its sounds, sights and similes a strong stench of Baghi Ballia, a dusty patch of UP badland that's not just nostalgic about the reputation it once had, but can also be delusional."

Sankhayan Ghosh of The Hindu highlighted the film’s unconventional approach to romance: "In the bizarrely named Kerry on Kutton, a clandestine meeting between Jyoti (Aradhana Jagota) and Kerry (Satyajeet Dubey) takes place in an aloo ka gudaam – a potato godown. Before we know it, they are making out. While they are at it, they make fart jokes and Jyoti remarks on Kerry's pan-stained teeth, 'Itna masala kyun khaate ho?' before engaging in a long smooch. This scene from the film stands out as it bends the rules of the standard lovemaking scene in Hindi cinema... In Kerry on Kutton, there are many such moments, dialogues that border on the profane: a heart-to-heart about men's urinal problems or a tooth found in a gulab jamun, most probably the halwai's."
