= Baankey Ki Crazy Baraat =

- Movie poster
- Directed by: Aijaz Khan
- Written by: Anita Mani
- Produced by: Anita Mani
- Starring: Rajpal Yadav; Sanjay Mishra; Vijay Raaz; Rakesh Bedi; Tia Bajpai; Satyajeet Dubey; Pankaj Jha
- Cinematography: John Wilmor
- Edited by: Suresh Pai
- Music by: Vijayaa Shanker; Abhishek Nailwal
- Release date: 28 August 2015
- Running time: 135 minutes
- Country: India
- Language: Hindi

Baankey Ki Crazy Baraat (Baankey's Crazy Wedding Procession) is a 2015 Bollywood comedy film directed by Aijaz Khan, starring Rajpal Yadav, Vijay Raaz, Sanjay Mishra, Tia Bajpai, Rakesh Bedi, Satyajeet Dubey and the director himself among others. Hazel Keech has a special appearance. It was produced by Anita Mani and released on 28 August 2015.

== Plot summary ==
This film follows the story of a 35-year-old bachelor Baankey (Rajpal Yadav), who is desperate to get married. He has a 'dosh' (translation: defect) in his 'kundali' (translation: horoscope) which has barred him from marriage. When he receives the proposal from Anjali (Tia Bajpai), he sets his heart to marry her. Unfortunately, it is found out that there is some issue with horoscope-matching. But Baankey is insistent upon marrying her. So, his father Nandlal (Rakesh Bedi), uncle Kanhaiyalal (Sanjay Mishra) and goon Lallan (Vijay Raaz) press the priest to find a way. The priest offers the solution of a proxy wedding in which a proxy groom has to substitute Baankey at the wedding 'mandap' and go through all the wedding rituals. The family then sets out to find a proxy groom and end up hiring Rajesh (Satyajeet Dubey in double role). However, on the day of the wedding, Rajesh does not show up. The shrewd uncle of Baankey, Kanhaiya convinces the bus driver, Virat Sharma (Satyajeet Dubey) to be the proxy groom, who accepts the offer because of his father's debt. Later, Virat and Anjali fall in love. Virat also engineers some second thoughts and keeps on hiking the amount of debt to be forgiven. Out of compulsion, the family agrees to his demands, and Virat ends up debt-free before the rituals are performed. Unaware of the truth, Anjali happily marries Virat. It is only after she reaches Baankey's place, she learns about the proxy wedding. Heartbroken after tricking Baankey, she calls Virat, who is then in the bus outside the house, remembering all the moments spent with her, realizing his immense love towards her. Upon receiving the call, Virat comes to rescue her and gets her out of that house. They are then chased by Lallan and his other goons, but the couple successfully elopes..

== Cast ==
- Rajpal Yadav as Baankey
- Sanjay Mishra as Kanhaiya
- Vijay Raaz as Lallan
- Rakesh Bedi as Nandlal
- Tia Bajpai as Anjali
- Satyajeet Dubey as Virat / Rajesh
- Anil Mange as Rajinder
- Aijaz Khan as Narayan
- Aashish Wadde as Mahesh
- Pankaj Jha as Relative of Lal Family
- Anusha Sampath as Pooja
- Hazel Keech in an item number
- Ramdayal rajpurohit as avadh

== Soundtrack ==
The music for Baankey ki Crazy Baraat is composed by Vijayaa Shanker and Abhishek Nailwal

=== Track listing ===
No.	Title	Lyrics	Music	Singer(s)	Length
1.	"Baby Modern Modern"	Ravi Basnet	Vijayaa Shanker	Shivranjani Singh, Sonu Nigam	3:26
2.	"Crazy Baraat"	Ravi Basnet	Vijayaa Shanker	Ravi Basnet, Vijayaa Shanker	4:27
3.	"Daant Saiyaan Ne"	Ravi Basnet	Vijayaa Shanker	Vijayaa Shanker	5:24
4.	"Dum Ali"	Ravi Basnet	Abhishek Nailwal, Vijayaa Shanker	Abhishek Nailwal, Aftab Sabri, Hashim Sabri	5:20
5.	"Yeh Kya Hua Hai"	Ravi Basnet	Vijayaa Shanker	Abhishek Nailwal	5:46
6.	"Yeh Kya Hua Hai(Reprise)"	Ravi Basnet	Vijayaa Shanker	Abhishek Nailwal	4:30
Total length:					28:53

== Critical reception ==
Kunal Gupta from Mumbai Mirror gave the film only 1 star and criticized it heavily. Johnson Thomas from The Free Press Journal also seemed to criticize the film. He mentioned it as just plain miserable mayhem. He wrote: "It's quite a convoluted set-up with nothing meritorious about it. The clutch of seasoned performers ... have nothing much to do other than repeat familiar character tropes in order to stay visible." Shaheen Parkar from Mid-Day gave 1.5 stars. She had mixed opinions about the film. She mentioned that it was pretty wholesome fare except for a forced item number. Even with seasoned actors of comic capers, it did not result in tongue-in-cheek humour as the plot meandered instead of concentrating on the funny lines. She wrote, "On the whole, the experience of watching Baankey Ki Crazy Baraat is like attending a lavish wedding feast but ending up with indigestion."
