= Good Night, Moon =

2010 short story by Bruce Sterling and Rudy Rucker

- Short story by Bruce Sterling and Rudy Rucker
- Cover of first edition (ebook)
- Country: United States
- Language: English
- Genre: Science fiction short story

Publication
- Published in: Tor.com
- Publication type: Periodical
- Publisher: Tor Books
- Media type: Online magazine
- Publication date: October 13, 2010

"Good Night, Moon" is a science fiction short story by Bruce Sterling and Rudy Rucker. It was first published in the online magazine Tor.com October 13, 2010.

== Synopsis ==
The story is set in a future where the entertainment industry has turned to dreams. At a delicatessen, two directors talk about the next episode of their dream series Skaken Recurrent Nightmare while the Moon has disappeared.

== Reception ==
Boing Boing's Cory Doctorow reviewed "Good Night, Moon" as "a madcap, hilarious, crazy-pants story" despite being "a little incoherent in spots". io9's Charlie Jane Anders said she found the short story "strange, unsettling—and highly quotable". Locus Online's Lois Tilton called it "crazy stuff, a lot of fun, and a sharp dissection of Hollywood trends" but notes "there is also cruelty here, a heartless milieu run by the shallow and self-absorbed". Tangent Online's Bob Blough said "This is a rather lightweight treatment of an interesting concept which made me laugh out loud more than once."
