= Pondicherry International Film Festival =

Independent film festival in India

The Pondicherry International Film Festival (PIFF) is a film festival for international independent films. It was started in 2017 by the streaming platform Pickurflick and the Puducherry Tourism agency.

== History ==
The inaugural event received more than 550 films from 50 countries. 170 films were selected. Screenings were held at Bangalore & Delhi from March to May 2017 with awards given across 12 categories. Pondicherry International Film Festival is an IMDb-qualifying event and has been rated amongst the top unconventional film festivals in India.

PIFF-2018 took place from 26 to 30 September 2018 at Alliance Francaise Pondicherry and other venues. It would showcase 100 films from over 25 countries. It will include panel discussions, open forums, and master classes. Besides film screenings, the five-day film festival will also conduct art, culture exhibition, food festival and music concerts to celebrate art, entertainment and travel in Puducherry, which was a French colony. The focus would be on French cinema, art, and culture; independent Tamil cinema; and independent regional cinema. The festival is organised by Pickurflick, a global distribution platform for indie filmmakers. It is supported by the Puducherry Tourism Department. Actor Adil Hussain is the brand ambassador. France is the partner country.

2022 saw a return to physical screenings, expanding its scope to Southeast Asia and Africa, and introducing a competition category for women filmmakers.

== Festival committee ==
- Abhishek Sinha - Founder & CEO

== Award categories ==
- Best Short Film
- 1st Runner Up (Short Film)
- Best Feature Film
- Best Director (Feature)
- Best Cinematography (Feature)
- Best Screenplay (Feature)
- Best Editing (Feature)
- Best Documentary
- 1st Runner Up (Documentary)
- Best Animation Short
- 1st Runner Up (Animation)
