= Golmaal =

Golmaal is the title of the following Indian films:

- Gol Maal, 1979 Hindi comedy film directed by Hrishikesh Mukherjee starring Amol Palekar
- Golmaal (1998 film), a Tamil film starring Selva
- Golmaal (2008 film), a Bengali film starring Prosenjit Chatterjee
- Gulumaal: The Escape, a 2009 Malayalam film
- Golmaal (2017 film), a Bengali film starring Mithun Chakraborty
- Golmaal (film series), a Hindi comedy film series directed by Rohit Shetty
  - Golmaal: Fun Unlimited, 2006 Hindi comedy film and the first installment of the Golmaal film series
  - Golmaal Returns, 2008 Hindi film sequel to Golmaal: Fun Unlimited
  - Golmaal 3, 2010 Hindi film sequel to Golmaal Returns
  - Golmaal Again, 2017 Hindi film sequel to Golmaal 3
  - Golmaal 5, Upcoming Hindi film sequel to Golmaal
- Golmaal, a Kannada film series, including
  - Golmaal Radhakrishna (1990)
  - Golmaal Part 2 (1991)
  - Samsaaradalli Golmaal (2012)

== See also ==
- Golmaal Jr., an Indian animated spinoff TV series from the Rohit Shetty film series
