= List of Hindi films of 2010 =

A list of films produced by the Bollywood film industry in 2010. Six films made it to the top 30 list of highest grossing Hindi films at the Indian box office. The total net amount earned by the top ten films of the year was ₹7,350.7 million (US$76 million), compared to 2009's ₹6.58 billion (US$68 million), a percentage increase of 11.71%. 2010 marks the first time that the top ten films alone crossed the ₹7 billion (US$73 million) mark. This year also marks the first time in Bollywood history that three films (Dabangg, My Name Is Khan and Golmaal 3) netted more than ₹1 billion (US$10 million).

== Box office collection ==
| No. | Title | Production company | Worldwide Gross | Ref. |
|---|---|---|---|---|
| 1 | Dabangg | Shree Ashtavinayak Cine Vision; Arbaaz Khan Productions | ₹221.14 crore (US$48.36 million) | |
| 2 | My Name Is Khan | Fox Star Studios; Fox Searchlight Pictures; Dharma Productions; Red Chillies Entertainment; Image Nation Abu Dhabi | ₹220.3 crore (US$48.18 million) | |
| 3 | Golmaal 3 | Shree Ashtavinayak Cine Vision; Eros International; Shree Ashtavinayak Light Camera Action | ₹167 crore (US$36.52 million) | |
| 4 | Raajneeti | UTV Motion Pictures; Walkwater Media; Prakash Raj Productions | ₹145.50 crore (US$31.82 million) | |
| 5 | Housefull | Eros International; Nadiadwala Grandson Entertainment | ₹114.18 crore (US$24.97 million) | |
| 6 | Tees Maar Khan | Hari Om Entertainment; UTV Motion Pictures; Three's Company Productions | ₹101.89 crore (US$22.28 million) | |
| 7 | Once Upon A Time In Mumbaai | Balaji Motion Pictures | ₹96.44 crore (US$21.09 million) | |
| 8 | I Hate Luv Storys | UTV Motion Pictures; Dharma Productions | ₹72.52 crore (US$15.86 million) | |
| 9 | Anjaana Anjaani | Eros International; Nadiadwala Grandson Entertainment | ₹69.85 crore (US$15.28 million) | |
| 10 | Khatta Meetha | Cape Of Good Films; Hari Om Entertainment; Shree Ashtavinayak Cine Vision | ₹62.79 crore (US$13.73 million) | |

== January–March ==
| Opening | | Title | Director | Cast | Genre | Studio |
|---|---|---|---|---|---|---|
| J A N | 8 | Dulha Mil Gaya | Muddassar Aziz | Shah Rukh Khan, Fardeen Khan, Sushmita Sen, Ishita Sharma, Tara Sharma, Anushka Manchanda, Mohit Chadda, Vivek Vaswani, Johnny Lever | Romantic comedy | |
| J A N | 8 | Pyaar Impossible! | Jugal Hansraj | Priyanka Chopra, Uday Chopra, Anupam Kher, Dino Morea | Romantic comedy | Yash Raj Films |
| J A N | 15 | Chance Pe Dance | Ken Ghosh | Shahid Kapoor, Mohnish Bahl, Genelia D'Souza, Vikas Bhalla, Parikshit Sahni, Satish Shah | Romance, Dance | UTV Motion Pictures |
| J A N | 15 | Hello! Hum Lallan Bol Rahe Hain | Dileep Shukla | Rajpal Yadav, Preeti Mehra | Comedy | |
| J A N | 22 | Veer | Anil Sharma | Salman Khan, Zarine Khan, Mithun Chakraborty, Sohail Khan, Jackie Shroff | Epic film | Eros International, Vijay Galani Movies |
| J A N | 29 | Ishqiya | Abhishek Chaubey | Naseeruddin Shah, Vidya Balan, Rajesh Sharma, Arshad Warsi | Black comedy, Romance | Shemaroo Entertainment, Vishal Bhardwaj Pictures |
| J A N | 29 | Rann | Ram Gopal Varma | Amitabh Bachchan, Sudeep, Ritesh Deshmukh, Paresh Rawal, Rajpal Yadav, Gul Panag, Rajat Kapoor, Suchitra Krishnamurthy, Neetu Chandra, Mohnish Behl | Drama, Thriller | Vistaar Religare Film Fund, Cinergy, Friday Entertainment Venture |
| J A N | 29 | Road To Sangam | Amit Rai | Paresh Rawal, Om Puri, Javed Sheikh | Drama | |
| F E B | 5 | The Hangman | Vishal Bhandari | Om Puri, Shreyas Talpade, Gulshan Grover, Smita Jaykar, Tom Alter, Anita Kanwar, Yatin Karyekar, Nazneen Ghaani, Amrita Bedi | Drama | |
| F E B | 5 | Striker | Chandan Arora | Siddharth Narayan, Aditya Pancholi, Ankur Vikal, Anupam Kher, Seema Biswas | Action | Indian Films, Studio 18, Makefilms |
| F E B | 12 | Sukhmani: Hope for Life | Manjeet Mann | Gurdas Maan, Juhi Chawla, Divya Dutta | Drama | |
| F E B | 12 | My Name Is Khan | Karan Johar | Shah Rukh Khan, Kajol, Vinay Pathak, Jimmy Shergill, Parvin Dabas, Sonya Jehan, Sugandha Garg, Arjun Mathur, Shane Harper, Kenton Duty, Arif Zakaria, Sumeet Raghavan, Osama bin Laden, Kavin Dave | Thriller, Adventure, Drama, Romance, Comedy | Fox Star Studios, Fox Searchlight Pictures, Dharma Productions, Red Chillies Entertainment, Image Nation Abu Dhabi |
| F E B | 19 | Aakhari Decision | Deepak Bandhu | Anant Jog, Sumona Chakravarti, Pradeep Kharab, Nagesh Bhonsle, Mushtaq Khan | Action | |
| F E B | 19 | Click | Sangeeth Sivan | Shreyas Talpade, Sadha, Sneha Ullal | Horror | Pritish Nandy Communications |
| F E B | 19 | Toh Baat Pakki! | Kedarh Shinde | Tabu, Sharman Joshi, Vatsal Sheth, Uvika Choudhary, Ayub Khan, Vishal Malhotra | Romantic comedy | |
| F E B | 26 | Karthik Calling Karthik | Vijay Lalwani | Farhan Akhtar, Deepika Padukone, Vivan Bhatena, Ram Kapoor, Vipin Sharma, Shefali Shah | Thriller | Eros International, Magic Beans Films, Excel Entertainment |
| F E B | 26 | Teen Patti | Leena Yadav | Amitabh Bachchan, Ben Kingsley, R. Madhavan, Saira Mohan, Raima Sen, Mahesh Manjrekar, Shraddha Kapoor | Drama, Thriller | Hinduja Ventures, Serendipity Films |
| M A R | 5 | Atithi Tum Kab Jaoge? | Ashwni Dhir | Ajay Devgn, Konkona Sen Sharma, Paresh Rawal, Satish Kaushik | Comedy | Warner Bros. Pictures, Wide Frame Films |
| M A R | 5 | Hello Zindagi | Raja Unnithan | Mrunmayee Lagoo, Milind Gunaji, Neena Gupta, Kanwaljeet Singh | Drama | |
| M A R | 5 | Road, Movie | Dev Benegal | Abhay Deol, Satish Kaushik, Tannishtha Chatterjee, Mohammed Faisal Usmani | Drama | Indian Films, Studio 18, August Entertainment |
| M A R | 5 | Rokkk | Rajesh Ranshinge | Udita Goswami, Shaad Randhawa, Nishigandha Wad, Tanushree Dutta | Thriller | |
| M A R | 5 | Thanks Maa | Irfan Kamal | Ranvir Shorey, Alok Nath, Raghuveer Yadav, Barry John, Sanjay Mishra | Drama | |
| M A R | 12 | Do Dilon Ke Khel Mein | Akash Pandey | Rajesh Khanna, Nausheen Ali Sardar, Sonika Gill, Satish Kaushik | Romantic comedy | |
| M A R | 12 | Hide & Seek | Shawn Arranha | Purab Kohli, Arjan Bajwa, Mrinalini Sharma, Samir Kochhar | Thriller | |
| M A R | 12 | Na Ghar Ke Na Ghaat Ke | Rahul Aggarwal | Rahul Aggarwal, Paresh Rawal, Narayani Shastri, Om Puri | Comedy | |
| M A R | 12 | Right Yaaa Wrong | Neeraj Pathak | Sunny Deol, Irrfan Khan, Isha Koppikar, Konkona Sen Sharma, Master Ali Haji | Action | |
| M A R | 12 | Trump Card | Arshad Khan | Vikram Kumar, Urvashi Chaudhary, Mansi Dovhal, Sheetal Bedi | Action, Thriller | |
| M A R | 19 | Idiot Box | Sunanda Mitra | Sushant Singh, Hrishita Bhatt, Jyoti Gauba, Milind Gunaji | Drama | |
| M A R | 19 | Lahore | Sanjay Puran Singh Chauhan | Aanaahad, Shraddha Das, Farooq Sheikh, Nafisa Ali | Sports/Social | Warner Bros. Pictures, Sai Om Films |
| M A R | 19 | Love Sex Aur Dhokha | Dibakar Banerjee | Amit Sial, Anshuman Jha, Arya Banerjee, Atul Mongia, Neha Chauhan, Shruti | Found footage | Balaji Motion Pictures, ALT Entertainment, Freshwater Films |
| M A R | 19 | Shaapit | Vikram Bhatt | Aditya Narayan, Shweta Agarwal, Rahul Dev, Shubh Joshi | Horror | ASA Productions & Enterprises |
| M A R | 26 | Hum Tum Aur Ghost | Kabeer Kaushik | Arshad Warsi, Dia Mirza, Sandhya Mridul, Boman Irani, Asawari Joshi, Javed Sheikh, Ashwin Mushran, Tinnu Anand | Comedy | Indian Films, Shooting Star Films, Studio 18 |
| M A R | 26 | It's a Man's World | Saurabh Sengupta | Mohsin Akhtar, Mouli Ganguly, Ranjeet Jha, Mikhil Chindaramani | Social | |
| M A R | 26 | Mittal v/s Mittal | Karan Razdan | Rituparna Sengupta, Rohit Roy, Gulshan Grover, Suchitra Krishnamurthy | Romance | |
| M A R | 26 | My Friend Ganesha 3 | Rajiv S. Ruia | Rahul Pendkalkar, Baba Sehgal, Eva Grover, Sayaji Shinde | Animation | Baba Arts, Liquid Pictures |
| M A R | 26 | Prem Kaa Game | Ashok Kheny | Arbaaz Khan, Tara Sharma, Madhuri Bhattacharya, Johnny Lever | Comedy | |
| M A R | 26 | Well Done Abba | Shyam Benegal | Boman Irani, Minissha Lamba, Sameer Dattani, Ravi Kissen | Social | Reliance Big Pictures |

== April–June ==
| Opening | | Title | Director | Cast | Genre | Studio |
|---|---|---|---|---|---|---|
| A P R | 2 | Pankh | Sudipto Chattopadhyaya | Bipasha Basu, Maradona Rebello, Mahesh Manjrekar, Ronit Roy Sanjeeda Sheikh | Social | |
| A P R | 2 | Sadiyaan | Raj Kanwar | Luv Sinha, Ferena Wazeir, Rekha, Hema Malini, Rishi Kapoor | Romance | |
| A P R | 2 | Tum Milo Toh Sahi | Kabir Sadanand | Nana Patekar, Dimple Kapadia, Rehan Khan, Sunil Shetty, Vidya Malvade, Anjana Sukhani, Mohnish Behl | Social/Drama | |
| A P R | 9 | Jaane Kahan Se Aayi Hai | Milap Zaveri | Riteish Deshmukh, Jacqueline Fernandez, Akshay Kumar, Priyanka Chopra, Deepika Padukone, Katrina Kaif, Vishal Malhotra, Sonal Sehgal, Amrita Rao, Ruslaan Mumtaz | Comedy/Romance/Fantasy | Warner Bros. Pictures, People Tree Films |
| A P R | 9 | Prince | Kookie Gulati | Vivek Oberoi, Aruna Shields, Nandana Sen, Neeru Bajwa, Isaiah, Sanjay Kapoor | Action/Sci-Fi/Thriller | |
| A P R | 9 | The Japanese Wife | Aparna Sen | Rahul Bose, Raima Sen, Chigasu Takaku, Moushmi Chatterjee | Romance | |
| A P R | 16 | Paathshaala | Milind Ukey | Shahid Kapoor, Nana Patekar, Ayesha Takia, Ali Haji, Swini Khara | Social | Eros International, Paper Doll Entertainment |
| A P R | 16 | Phoonk 2 | Milind Gadagkar | Sudeep, Neeru Bajwa, Amruta Khanvilkar, Ahsaas Channa | Horror | |
| A P R | 23 | Apartment | Jagmohan Mundhra | Rohit Roy, Tanushree Dutta, Neetu Chandra, Anupam Kher | Thriller | |
| A P R | 23 | Bird Idol | Jyotin Goel | | Animation | |
| A P R | 23 | City of Gold | Mahesh Manjrekar | Vineet Kumar, Sameer Dharmadhikari, Kashmira Shah, Satish Kaushik | Social | DAR Motion Pictures |
| A P R | 23 | Kuchh Kariye | Jagbir Dahiya | Sukhwinder Singh, Vikrum Kumar, Rufy Khan | | |
| A P R | 23 | Muskurake Dekh Zara | Som Shekar | Gashmeer Mahajani, Twinkle Patel, Hiten Paintal, Sunil Sabarwal, Simran Suri | Romantic Comedy | |
| A P R | 30 | Chase | Jagmohan Mundhra | Udita Goswami, Caterina Murino, Rajesh Khattar, Shweta Menon | Action | |
| A P R | 30 | Housefull | Sajid Khan | Akshay Kumar, Arjun Rampal, Deepika Padukone, Riteish Deshmukh, Lillete Dubey, Lara Dutta, Malaika Arora, Randhir Kapoor, Jiah Khan, Boman Irani, Chunky Pandey | Comedy | Eros International, Nadiadwala Grandson Entertainment |
| M A Y | 7 | Badmaash Company | Parmeet Sethi | Shahid Kapoor, Anushka Sharma, Anupam Kher, Meiyang Chang, Vir Das, Harry Mearing | Romance/Drama | Yash Raj Films |
| M A Y | 14 | Bumm Bumm Bole | Priyadarshan | Darsheel Safary, Kaveri Jha, Atul Kulkarni, Rituparna Sengupta, Ziyah Vastani | Children/Drama | Percept Pictures, Sanjay Ghodawat Group |
| M A Y | 14 | Admissions Open | K.D. Satyam | Anupam Kher, Aashish Vidyarthi, Ankur Khanna, Pramod Moutho | Drama | |
| M A Y | 14 | Kushti | T K Rajeev Kumar | Rajpal Yadav, Khali, Nargis, Sharat Saxena | Comedy/Romance | |
| M A Y | 21 | Kites | Anurag Basu | Hrithik Roshan, Barbara Mori, Kangana Ranaut | Action | Reliance Big Pictures, FilmKraft Productions |
| J U N | 4 | Raajneeti | Prakash Jha | Ajay Devgn, Ranbir Kapoor, Arjun Rampal, Nana Patekar, Katrina Kaif, Manoj Bajpai, Naseeruddin Shah, Sarah Thompson | Drama/Political Thriller | UTV Motion Pictures, Walkwater Media, Prakash Jha Productions |
| J U N | 11 | Ek Second... Jo Zindagi Badal De? | Partho Ghosh | Jackie Shroff, Manisha Koirala, Aman Verma, Moammar Rana | Thriller | |
| J U N | 18 | Raavan | Mani Ratnam | Vikram, Abhishek Bachchan, Aishwarya Rai Bachchan, Govinda, Nikhil Dwivedi, Priyamani | Action/Romance | Reliance Big Pictures, Madras Talkies |
| J U N | 25 | Krantiveer – The Revolution | Mehul Kumar | Jahan Bloch, Sameer Aftab, Aman Verma | Action | |
| J U N | 25 | Mr. Singh Mrs. Mehta | Pravesh Raman | Aruna Shields, Prashant Narayanan | Drama | |

== July–September ==
| Opening | | Title | Director | Cast | Genre | Studio |
|---|---|---|---|---|---|---|
| J U L | 2 | I Hate Luv Storys | Punit Malhotra | Imran Khan, Kavin Dave, Sonam Kapoor, Sameer Dattani, Aamir Ali | Romance | UTV Motion Pictures, Dharma Productions |
| J U L | 9 | Milenge Milenge | Satish Kaushik | Kareena Kapoor, Shahid Kapoor, Aarti Chabria | Romance | Sahara One Motion Pictures, Eros International, BSK Network & Entertainment |
| J U L | 9 | Red Alert: The War Within | Anant Mahadevan | Sunil Shetty, Vinod Khanna, Naseeruddin Shah, Sameera Reddy, Bhagyashree, Murli Sharma | Action | |
| J U L | 16 | Lamhaa | Rahul Dholakia | Sanjay Dutt, Bipasha Basu, Kunal Kapoor, Murali Sharma, Anupam Kher | Action | PVR Pictures, G.S Entertainment |
| J U L | 16 | Tere Bin Laden | Abhishek Sharma | Ali Zafar, Sugandha Garg, Rahul Singh, Barry John, Nikhil Ratnaparkhi | Comedy | Walkwater Media |
| J U L | 16 | Udaan | Vikramaditya Motwane | Ronit Roy, Rajat Barmecha | Drama | UTV Spotboy |
| J U L | 23 | Khatta Meetha | Priyadarshan | Akshay Kumar, Trisha Krishnan, Rajpal Yadav, Johnny Lever, Urvashi Sharma | Comedy, Drama, Romance | Eros International, Hari Om Entertainment, Shree Ashtavinayak Cine Vision |
| J U L | 30 | Once Upon a Time in Mumbaai | Milan Luthria | Ajay Devgn, Emraan Hashmi, Kangana Ranaut, Prachi Desai, Randeep Hooda | Action, Romance, Thriller, Crime | Balaji Motion Pictures |
| A U G | 6 | Aisha | Rajshree Ojha | Sonam Kapoor, Abhay Deol, Anand Tiwari, Ira Dubey, Amrita Puri, Arunoday Singh, Cyrus Sahukar, Lisa Haydon | Romance, Comedy | PVR Pictures, Anil Kapoor Films Company |
| A U G | 13 | Help | Rajeev Virani | Bobby Deol, Mugdha Godse, Sophia Handa, Shreyas Talpade | Horror | |
| A U G | 13 | Peepli Live | Anusha Rizvi | Omkar Das Manikpuri, Raghubir Yadav | Political, Comedy | UTV Motion Pictures, Aamir Khan Productions |
| A U G | 20 | Lafangey Parindey | Pradeep Sarkar | Neil Nitin Mukesh, Deepika Padukone, Namit Das, Kay Kay Menon | Romance | Yash Raj Films |
| A U G | 20 | ...And Once Again | Amol Palekar | Antara Mali, Rajat Kapoor, Rituparna Sengupta | Drama | |
| A U G | 27 | Hello Darling | Manoj Tiwari | Celina Jaitly, Isha Koppikar, Gul Panag | Comedy | Mukta Arts |
| A U G | 27 | Antardwand | Sushil Rajpal | Raja Chaudhary, Vinay Pathak | Crime | |
| A U G | 27 | Aashayein | Nagesh Kukunoor | John Abraham, Sonal Sehgal, Prateeksha Lonkar | Drama | Percept Pictures |
| A U G | 27 | Soch Lo | Sartaj Singh Pannu | Sartaj Singh Pannu, Barkha Madan, Bhupinder Singh | Mystery, Suspense | |
| S E P | 3 | We Are Family | Siddharth Malhotra | Arjun Rampal, Kajol, Kareena Kapoor | Drama, Romance | UTV Motion Pictures, Columbia Pictures, Dharma Productions |
| S E P | 3 | Mallika | Wilson Louis | Sameer Dattani, Sheena Nayar, Himanshu Malik | Horror | |
| S E P | 3 | The Film Emotional Atyachar | Akshay Shere | Mohit Alawat, Kalki Koechlin, Vinay Pathak, Ranvir Shorey, Ravi Kishan, Sakshi Gulati | Drama | |
| S E P | 10 | Dabangg | Abhinav Kashyap | Salman Khan, Arbaaz Khan, Sonakshi Sinha, Sonu Sood, Mahie Gill, Vinod Khanna, Dimple Kapadia, Om Puri, Anupam Kher, Mahesh Manjrekar, Malaika Arora Khan | Action | Eros International, Shree Ashtavinayak Cine Vision, Arbaaz Khan Productions |

== October–December ==
| Opening | | Title | Director | Cast | Genre | Studio |
|---|---|---|---|---|---|---|
| O C T | 1 | Anjaana Anjaani | Siddharth Anand | Priyanka Chopra, Ranbir Kapoor, Zayed Khan, Vishal Malhotra | Romance | Eros International, Nadiadwala Grandson Entertainment |
| O C T | 1 | Benny and Babloo | Yunus Sajawal | Kay Kay Menon, Rajpal Yadav, Riya Sen, Shweta Tiwari, Rukhsar Rehman, Anita Hassanandani, Richa Chadha, Maushumi Udeshi, Hiten Paintal, Aasif Sheikh | Comedy | |
| O C T | 1 | Khichdi: The Movie | Aatish Kapadia | Supriya Pathak, Anang Desai, Rajeev Mehta, Jamnadas Majethia, Nimisha Vakharia | Comedy | Fox Star Studios, Hats Off Productions |
| O C T | 8 | Crook | Mohit Suri | Emraan Hashmi, Neha Sharma, Arjan Bajwa, Kavin Dave | Thriller | Vishesh Films |
| O C T | 8 | Do Dooni Chaar | Habib Faisal | Rishi Kapoor, Neetu Singh, Mohit Chadda, Rajesh Vivek, Aditi Vasudev, Natasha Rastogi | Comedy | Walt Disney Pictures, Planman Motion Pictures |
| O C T | 15 | Aakrosh | Priyadarshan | Ajay Devgn, Akshaye Khanna, Bipasha Basu, Reema Sen, Paresh Rawal | Thriller | Eros International, Big Screen Entertainment, Zee Motion Pictures |
| O C T | 15 | Pusher | Assad Raja | Mahima Chaudhry, Pasha Bocarie, Marc Anwar, Assad Raja | Action, Drama | |
| O C T | 15 | Knock Out | Mani Shankar | Sanjay Dutt, Kangana Ranaut, Irrfan Khan, Gulshan Grover | Action | |
| O C T | 15 | Kajraare | Pooja Bhatt | Himesh Reshammiya, Sara Loren, Gaurav Chanana, Javed Sheikh | Romance | T-Series Films |
| O C T | 15 | Ramayana: The Epic | Cheetan Desai | Manoj Bajpai, Juhi Chawla, Sanjeev Tiwari, Ashutosh Rana | Animation | Warner Bros. Pictures, Maya Digital Media |
| O C T | 22 | Hisss | Jennifer Lynch | Mallika Sherawat, Irrfan Khan | Horror/Thriller | |
| O C T | 22 | Jhootha Hi Sahi | Abbas Tyrewala | John Abraham, Pakhi Tyrewala, Abhishek Bachchan, Ritesh Deshmukh | Romance | |
| O C T | 22 | Rakta Charitra | Ram Gopal Verma | Vivek Oberoi, Sudeep, Radhika Apte, Shatrughan Sinha, Kota Srinivasa Rao, Abhimanyu Singh, Sushant Singh | Biographical | Vistaar Religare Film Fund, Cinergy |
| O C T | 29 | Maalik Ek | Deepak Balraj Vij | Jackie Shroff, Divya Dutta | Biographical, Animation | |
| O C T | 29 | Nakshatra | Mohan Savalkar | Anupam Kher, Shubh, Sabina Sheema | Romance | |
| N O V | 5 | Golmaal 3 | Rohit Shetty | Ajay Devgn, Mithun Chakraborty, Tusshar Kapoor, Arshad Warsi, Shreyas Talpade, Kareena Kapoor, Kunal Khemu, Ratna Pathak, Murli Sharma, Johnny Lever | Comedy | Shree Ashtavinayak Cine Vision, Eros International, Shree Ashtavinayak Light Camera Action |
| N O V | 5 | Action Replayy | Vipul Amrutlal Shah | Akshay Kumar, Aishwarya Rai Bachchan, Rajpal Yadav, Aditya Roy Kapur, Sudeepa Singh, Rannvijay Singh, Neha Dhupia, Randhir Kapoor | Comedy | PVR Pictures, Hari Om Entertainment, Sunshine Pictures |
| N O V | 12 | Dunno Y... Na Jaane Kyon | Sanjay Sharma | Aryan Vaid, Kapil Sharma, Rituparna Sengupta, Helen, Zeenat Aman | Romance | |
| N O V | 12 | A Flat | Raaj Verma | Sanjay Suri, Jimmy Shergill | Thriller | |
| N O V | 12 | Ramaa: The Saviour | Haadi Abrar | Sahil Khan, Tanushree Dutta, Dalip Singh Rana | Action, Adventure | |
| N O V | 19 | Guzaarish | Sanjay Leela Bhansali | Hrithik Roshan, Aishwarya Rai Bachchan, Suhel Seth, Aditya Roy Kapur, Shernaz Patel, Priyanka Bose, Ash Chandler, Swara Bhaskar | Romance/Drama | UTV Motion Pictures, Sanjay Leela Bhansali Films |
| N O V | 19 | Shahrukh Bola "Khoobsurat Hai Tu" | Makrand Deshpande | Preetika Chawla, Afzaal Khan, Shahrukh Khan, Kay Kay Menon | Thriller | |
| N O V | 19 | Diwangi Ne Had Kar Di | Jiten Purohit | Aditya Raj Kapoor, Deep, Ashhmita | Romance/Thriller | |
| N O V | 26 | Allah Ke Banday | Faruk Kabir | Sharman Joshi, Naseeruddin Shah, Faruk Kabir | Thriller | |
| N O V | 26 | Break Ke Baad | Danish Aslam | Imran Khan, Deepika Padukone, Navin Nischol, Lillete Dubey | Romance | Reliance Big Pictures, Kunal Kohli Productions |
| N O V | 26 | Khuda Kasam | K C Bokadia | Sunny Deol, Tabu, Farida Jalal, Govind Namdeo | Action | |
| D E C | 3 | Khelein Hum Jee Jaan Sey | Ashutosh Gowariker | Abhishek Bachchan, Deepika Padukone, Sikander Kher | Period | PVR Pictures, Ashutosh Gowariker Productions |
| D E C | 3 | Phas Gaye Re Obama | Subhash Kapoor | Rajat Kapoor, Neha Dhupia | Comedy/Crime | Warner Bros. Pictures, Revel Films |
| D E C | 3 | Rakta Charitra 2 | Ram Gopal Verma | Suriya, Vivek Oberoi, Sudeep, Shatrughan Sinha | Biographical | |
| D E C | 10 | Band Baaja Baaraat | Maneesh Sharma | Ranveer Singh, Anushka Sharma, Neeraj Sood | Romance/Drama | Yash Raj Films |
| D E C | 10 | No Problem | Anees Bazmee | Paresh Rawal, Anil Kapoor, Sushmita Sen, Neetu Chandra, Kangana Ranaut, Akshaye Khanna, Sunil Shetty, Sanjay Dutt | Comedy | Eros International, Anil Kapoor Films Company, Spice Studios, Rawail Grandsons Entertainment & Software |
| D E C | 17 | 332 Mumbai to India | Mahesh Pandey | Ali Asgar, Chetan Pandit | Thriller | |
| D E C | 17 | Payback | Sachin P. Karande | Munish Khan, Sara Khan, Gulshan Grover | Thriller | |
| D E C | 17 | Kaalo | Wilson Louis | Swini Khara, Aditya Srivastava, Gufi Paintal | Horror | |
| D E C | 17 | Mirch | Vinay Shukla | Konkona Sen Sharma, Raima Sen, Shahana Goswami, Ila Arun, Shreyas Talpade | Drama | Reliance Big Pictures |
| D E C | 24 | Tees Maar Khan | Farah Khan | Akshay Kumar, Katrina Kaif, Akshaye Khanna, Arya Babbar, Mia Uyeda, Murali Sharma | Action comedy | Hari Om Entertainment, UTV Motion Pictures, Three's Company Productions |
| D E C | 24 | Isi Life Mein...! | Vidhi Kasliwal | Akshay Oberoi, Sandeepa Dhar, Mohnish Behl | Drama | |
| D E C | 24 | Toonpur Ka Superrhero | Kireet Khurana | Ajay Devgn, Kajol, Sanjay Dutt | Animated | Eros International, Big Screen Entertainment, Climb Media |
| D E C | 31 | Tera Kya Hoga Johnny | Sudhir Mishra | Neil Nitin Mukesh, Soha Ali Khan, Kay Kay Menon, Shahana Goswami | Thriller | |
| D E C | 31 | Ada... A Way of Life | Tanvir Ahmad | Ayaan Ahmad, Nauheed Cyrusi, Ayesha Jhulka, Rahul Roy, Milind Gunaji | Drama | |

== See also ==
- List of Hindi films of 2011
- List of Hindi films of 2009
