= Golmaal 5 =

Upcoming film by Rohit Shetty

- Directed by: Rohit Shetty
- Produced by: Rohit Shetty
- Starring: Ajay Devgn; Akshay Kumar; Arshad Warsi; Kunal Khemu; Shreyas Talpade; Priyamani; Tusshar Kapoor; Sharman Joshi; Tripti Dimri
- Cinematography: Girish Kant; Raza Mehta
- Production company: Rohit Shetty Picturez
- Release date: 8 January 2027
- Country: India
- Language: Hindi

Golmaal 5 (transl. Chaos 5) is an upcoming Indian Hindi-language action comedy film directed by Rohit Shetty. It is the fifth installment in the Golmaal franchise. The film features an ensemble cast consisting of Ajay Devgn, Akshay Kumar, Arshad Warsi, Kunal Khemu, Shreyas Talpade, Priyamani, Tusshar Kapoor, and Sharman Joshi.

== Cast ==
- Ajay Devgn as Gopal
- Akshay Kumar as Bala Bhau
- Arshad Warsi as Madhav
- Kunal Khemu as Laxman 2
- Shreyas Talpade as Laxman 1
- Tusshar Kapoor as Lucky
- Sharman Joshi as Laxman 3
- Priyamani
- Rakesh Bedi
- Tiku Talsania
- Kashmera Shah
- Triptii Dimri
- Suhasini Mulay
- Murali Sharma as Inspector Dhande
- Govind Namdeo
- Medha Shankar
- Shama Sikandar
- Janki Bodiwala
- Tamannaah Bhatia
- Tabu
- Vijay Patkar
- Ashwini Kalsekar
- Sharat Saxena
- Farzil Pardiwala
- Shrikant Varma
- Archana Puran Singh
- Sulabha Arya
- Anjana Sukhani
- Prakash Raj as Vasu Reddy
- Anil Charanjeett
- Ishitta Arun
- Sanjay Mishra as Bablu

== Production ==
=== Development ===
In April 2019, Shreyas Talpade, who had appeared in all installments of the franchise except the first film, stated that director Rohit Shetty was working on the story of the next installment and had already discussed the idea with the cast, with shooting expected to begin in 2020 after completing his other projects. Later that year, Ajay Devgn confirmed that the film was being planned with Rohit Shetty, expressing interest in continuing the series after the success of the earlier films.

In June 2025, reports stated that Rohit Shetty planned to begin work on the film after completing his biographical film on Rakesh Maria, with the script in development and filming expected to begin in early 2026. The film's development was further hinted in a cameo appearance at the end of Son of Sardaar 2 (2025), in which Shetty appeared alongside Ajay Devgn's character and stated that he was preparing for Golmaal 5. In December 2025, it was reported that the makers planned to reunite the original cast of the franchise for the fifth installment as a fantasy comedy, while also introducing the series' first female antagonist. According to trade reports, the rights to the Golmaal franchise, whose first film Golmaal: Fun Unlimited (2006) was produced by Shree Ashtavinayak Cine Vision, were initially held by film producer Dhilin Mehta and later acquired by Tejpal (Rajubhai) Shah of the T. A. Shah Group, who subsequently assigned the rights to director Rohit Shetty for future installments of the series.

In February 2026, several sources suggested that the film would feature a rivalry between characters portrayed by Ajay Devgn and Akshay Kumar, described as having a Tom and Jerry–like dynamic, leading to comparisons with the 1980 film Do Aur Do Paanch. The reports also noted that some of Rohit Shetty's earlier comedies had drawn inspiration from older Hindi films. However, Rohit Shetty Picturez later issued a clarification stating that the film was not a remake of Do Aur Do Paanch and that the reports circulating online were inaccurate. In April, reports indicated that Golmaal 5 would depart from the franchise's traditional formula by not featuring a female lead or romantic subplot, marking the first time in the series that such elements were excluded. Although Priyamani appears in the film, her role does not include a romantic relationship with Ajay Devgn's character or any of the others.

=== Casting ===
In February 2026, Priyamani joined the cast, marking her reunion with Ajay Devgn following their collaboration on Maidaan (2024), and began shooting her portions, with details of her role being kept under wraps. The film was officially announced on 14 March 2026, on director Rohit Shetty's birthday through a promotional video shot on the film's set featuring actor Akshay Kumar in a bald look, confirming his addition to the ensemble cast alongside Ajay Devgn, Arshad Warsi, Kunal Khemu, Shreyas Talpade, Tusshar Kapoor, and Sharman Joshi. Later that month, Akshay Kumar stated in an interview that he would not play the lead role in the film, confirming that Devgn would remain the central character, and added that he had "no insecurity" about appearing in a non-lead role.

=== Filming ===
Set construction for the film reportedly began in January 2026 at Film City in Mumbai, where multiple sets, including a café, a police station, and a residential structure, were erected. The production was planned to be largely shot at the location instead of the franchise's usual filming sites in Goa and Ramoji Film City in Hyderabad, with additional sets built near a lake within the Film City complex after plans to modify the lake area were not approved by the authorities.

Principal photography began in February 2026 in Mumbai, Maharashtra. The following month, Akshay Kumar allocated dates for an approximately 18–day shooting schedule, set to begin at the end of March after delays to his film Bhagam Bhag 2. In late April, a schedule commenced in Ooty, Tamil Nadu.

== Music ==
In February 2026, it was reported that T-Series acquired the film's music rights for approximately ₹9 crore. According to reports, there will be a beach party song sung by Mika Singh.
