= Golmaal (film series) =

Indian film series by Rohit Shetty

- Created by: Rohit Shetty; Neeraj Vora
- Original work: Golmaal: Fun Unlimited (2006)
- Owners: Shree Ashtavinayak Cine Vision Limited; Reliance Entertainment

Films and television
- Films: Golmaal: Fun Unlimited (2006); Golmaal Returns (2008); Golmaal 3 (2010); Golmaal Again (2017); Golmaal 5 (2027)

Audio
- Soundtracks: Golmaal: Fun Unlimited; Golmaal Returns; Golmaal 3; Golmaal Again

Golmaal is an Indian comedy film series directed by Rohit Shetty, with four films to date, the first three produced by Dhilin Mehta, the fourth by Shetty and Sangeeta Ahir. The first film Golmaal: Fun Unlimited released in 2006 and was followed by 4 sequels: Golmaal Returns (2008), Golmaal 3 (2010) and Golmaal Again (2017) and Golmaal 5 (2027). All the films starred Ajay Devgn, Arshad Warsi, Tusshar Kapoor, Sanjay Mishra, Vrajesh Hirjee and Mukesh Tiwari, with Shreyas Talpade, Ashwini Kalsekar, and Murali Sharma appearing in three, and Kareena Kapoor Khan, Kunal Khemu and Johnny Lever in two. Reportedly, Sharman Joshi is returning in the franchise in the Golmaal 5 after appearing in the first film. Akshay Kumar will also be seen in the 5th sequel. The series also has a spin-off named Cirkus was released on 23 December 2022.

Golmaal is now the tenth-highest-grossing film series in Bollywood. The film series has been described as a screwball comedy franchise.

An animated version of the film series named Golmaal Jr. was released for with three central characters: Madhav, Gopal and Lucky.

== Films ==
| Film | Release date | Director | Screenwriter(s) | Story | Producer(s) |
|---|---|---|---|---|---|
| Golmaal: Fun Unlimited | 14 July 2006 | Rohit Shetty | Neeraj Vora | Ghar Ghar by Harsh Shivsharan | Dhilin Mehta, Parag Sanghvi |
| Golmaal Returns | 29 October 2008 | Rohit Shetty | Yunus Sajawal | Pheka Pheki by Bipin Varti | Dhilin Mehta |
| Golmaal 3 | 5 November 2010 | Rohit Shetty | Yunus Sajawal | Yours, Mine and Ours by Melville Shavelson | Dhilin Mehta |
| Golmaal Again | 20 October 2017 | Rohit Shetty | Yunus Sajawal | Rohit Shetty | Sangeeta Sachin Ahir, Rohit Shetty, Shivashish Sarkar |
| Golmaal 5 | 8 Jan 2027 | Rohit Shetty | TBA | TBA | Rohit Shetty |

=== Golmaal: Fun Unlimited (2006) ===
Friends Gopal, Lucky, Madhav and Laxman often dupe gullible people out of their money. Hilarity ensues when they target an elderly couple and simultaneously try wooing their beautiful neighbour.

=== Golmaal Returns (2008) ===
Gopal, who lives with his ever suspecting wife, Ekta, gets stuck in a yacht for a night after he saves an attractive young woman from a bunch of hooligans. Ekta suspects him of having an affair and decides to uncover the truth.

=== Golmaal 3 (2010) ===
Cupid strikes when Pritam, a single father, comes across his college sweetheart, Geeta, in Goa. However, when their respective children go at war with each other, the two find it difficult to reunite.

=== Golmaal Again (2017) ===
Five orphan men return to the orphanage they grew up in to attend their mentor's funeral. However, they encounter the ghost of their childhood friend, Khushi, and help her attain salvation.

=== Golmaal 5 (2027) ===
After the release of the fourth installment, director Rohit Shetty expressed interest in making a fifth part of the franchise, after getting the right script. Ajay Devgn showed interest to return in the next part, with reports of Kareena Kapoor also returning for the next installment.

On 14 March 2026, on the occasion of Shetty's birthday, it was announced that Golmaal 5 would officially begin filming, with Ajay Devgn, Arshad Warsi, Tusshar Kapoor, Shreyas Talpade, Kunal Khemu returning, alongside Sharman Joshi, who appears in the franchise for the first time since Golmaal: Fun Unlimited (2006), having been absent from all subsequent installments and Akshay Kumar joining the cast.And alongside that Triptii Dimri, Medha Shankr, Govind Namdev, Tiku Talsania, Sharat Saxena, Mukesh Tiwari, Sulabha Arya, Rakesh Bedi and many more cast are confirmed to be in supporting roles.

== Spin off films ==
| Film | Release date | Director | Screenwriter(s) | Story | Producer(s) |
|---|---|---|---|---|---|
| Cirkus | 23 December 2022 | Rohit Shetty | Yunus Sajawal | Farhad Samji, Sanchit Bedre, Vidhi Ghadgaonkar | Rohit Shetty, Bhushan Kumar, Krishan Kumar |

=== Cirkus (2022) ===
A scientist separates two sets of identical twins to find the conflict between nature vs nurture. However, years later the twins come close and creates confusion and hilarious situations.

It was revealed in the upcoming film Cirkus trailer released in December 2022, that film is set in 1960's and it would be a prequel to the fourth film of Golmaal series. In the trailer five kids was standing in front of "Jamnadas Orphanage" and telling their names - Gopal, Madhav and Laxman (2 kids), while the fifth kid is mute and trying to tell his name is Lucky. However, the film failed massively at the box-office.

== Cast and characters ==
This table lists the main characters who appear in the Golmaal franchise.

| Actor | Film | | | | |
| Actor | Golmaal: Fun Unlimited (2006) | Golmaal Returns (2008) | Golmaal 3 (2010) | Golmaal Again (2017) | Golmaal 5 (2027) |
|---|---|---|---|---|---|
| Ajay Devgn | Gopal | Gopal | Gopal | Gopal | Gopal |
| Arshad Warsi | Madhav | Madhav | Madhav | Madhav | Madhav |
| Tusshar Kapoor | Lucky | Lucky | Lucky | Lucky | Lucky |
| Sharman Joshi | Laxman Prasad | | | | Laxman Prasad |
| Shreyas Talpade | | Laxman | Laxman | Laxman | Laxman |
| Kunal Khemu | | | Laxman | Laxman | Laxman |
| Sanjay Mishra | Bubbly | Subodh Mehra | Dagga | Bubbly | TBA |
| Mukesh Tiwari | Vasooli | Vasooli | Vasooli | Vasooli | Vasooli |
| Vrajesh Hirjee | Pandurang | Anthony Gonsalves | Teja | Pandurang | TBA |
| Ashwini Kalsekar | | Munni | Chintu | Damini | TBA |
| Murali Sharma | | M.D. Sawant | Inspector Dhande | Inspector Dhande | Inspector Dhande |
| Johnny Lever | | | Puppy | Puppy | Puppy |
| Vijay Patkar | | | Constable Gandhari | Constable Gandhari | Constable Gandhari |
| Siddarth Jadhav | Sattu Supari | Lucky's Assistant | | | |
| Paresh Rawal | Somnath | | | | |
| Rimi Sen | Nirali | | | | |
| Sushmita Mukherjee | Mangala | | | | |
| Manoj Joshi | Harishchandra "HaRaMi" Ramchandra Mirchandani | | | | |
| Kareena Kapoor | | Ekta | Divya "Dabbo" Kalamkar | | |
| Amrita Arora | | Esha | | | |
| Celina Jaitley | | Meera Mena | | | |
| Anjana Sukhani | | Daisy Paschisia | | | |
| Mithun Chakraborty | | | Pritam "Pappu" | | |
| Ratna Pathak Shah | | | Geeta "Guddi" Patnaik | | |
| Parineeti Chopra | | | | Khushi Bansal | |
| Neil Nitin Mukesh | | | | Nikhil | |
| Tabu | | | | Anna Mathew | |
| Prakash Raj | | | | Vasu Reddy | |
| Sachin Khedekar | | | | Colonel Chouhan | |
| Nana Patekar | | | | Ghost | |
| Uday Tikekar | | | | Joy Jamnadas | |
| Akshay Kumar | | | | | TBA |
| Priyamani | | | | | TBA |

== Additional crew and production details ==
| Occupation | Film | | | | |
| Occupation | Golmaal: Fun Unlimited (2006) | Golmaal Returns (2008) | Golmaal 3 (2010) | Golmaal Again (2017) | Cirkus (2022) |
|---|---|---|---|---|---|
| Director | Rohit Shetty | Rohit Shetty | Rohit Shetty | Rohit Shetty | Rohit Shetty |
| Producer(s) | Dhillin Mehta | Dhillin Mehta | Dhillin Mehta | Rohit Shetty; Sangeeta Ahir | Rohit Shetty; Bhushan Kumar |
| Screenplay | Neeraj Vora | Yunus Sajawal | Yunus Sajawal | Yunus Sajawal | Yunus Sajawal |
| Story | Sajid-Farhad | Sajid-Farhad | Rohit Shetty | Rohit Shetty | Rohit Shetty |
| Composer(s) | Vishal–Shekhar | Pritam; Ashish Pandit | Pritam | Amaal Mallik; S. Thaman; Lijo George-DJ Chetas; Abhishek Arora | Devi Sri Prasad; Lijo George-DJ Chetas |
| Background Score | Sanjoy Chowdhury | Sanjoy Chowdhury | Sanjoy Chowdhury | Amar Mohile | Amar Mohile |
| Director of photography | Aseem Bajaj | Natty Subramaniam | Dudley | Jomon T. John | Jomon T. John |
| Editor(s) | Steven H. Bernard | Steven H. Bernard | Steven H. Bernard | Bunty Nagi | Bunty Nagi |
| Production Companies | Shree Ashtavinayak Cine Vision Ltd; K Sera Sera Private Limited | Shree Ashtavinayak Cine Vision Ltd | Shree Ashtavinayak Cine Vision Ltd | Rohit Shetty Pictures, Mangal Murti Films, Reliance Entertainment | Rohit Shetty Pictures; T-Series Films |
| Distributing Companies | Shree Ashtavinayak Cine Vision Ltd; Eros International | Shemaroo Entertainment | Eros International | Reliance Entertainment | Reliance Entertainment |
| Running Time | 150 minutes | 135 minutes | 140 minutes | 152 minutes | 139 minutes |

== Reception ==
Box office

| | Film | | | | |
| | Golmaal: Fun Unlimited (2006) | Golmaal Returns (2008) | Golmaal 3 (2010) | Golmaal Again (2017) | Cirkus (2022) |
|---|---|---|---|---|---|
| Budget | ₹15 crore (US$3.31 million) | ₹35 crore (US$8.05 million) | ₹50 crore (US$10.93 million) | ₹80 crore (US$12.28 million) | ₹150 crore (US$19.08 million) |
| Domestic gross | ₹41.49 crore (US$9.16 million) | ₹70.89 crore (US$16.29 million) | ₹149.12 crore (US$32.61 million) | ₹264.89 crore (US$40.68 million) | ₹42.44 crore (US$5.4 million) |
| Overseas gross | ₹9.18 crore (US$2.03 million) | ₹14.91 crore (US$3.43 million) | ₹37.86 crore (US$8.28 million) | ₹59.09 crore (US$9.07 million) | ₹19.03 crore (US$2.42 million) |
| Total gross | ₹46.72 crore (US$10.31 million) | ₹80 crore (US$18.39 million) | ₹169.56 crore (US$37.08 million) | ₹311.04 crore (US$47.76 million) | ₹61.47 crore (US$7.82 million) |
| Franchise gross | ₹668.74 crore (US$69 million) | | | | |

Critical reception

| Film | Rotten Tomatoes |
|---|---|
| Golmaal: Fun Unlimited | N/A (1 reviews) |
| Golmaal Returns | 0% (3.7/10 average rating) (6 reviews) |
| Golmaal 3 | 44% (5.5/10 average rating) (9 reviews) |
| Golmaal Again | 50% (4.7/10 average rating) (8 reviews) |

== Animated series ==
An animated series Golmaal Jr. based on the characters from film series premiered on Nickelodeon Sonic on 13 May 2019 and later on Nickelodeon India. However it does not follow with the Golmaal canon and does not serve as a prequel to the Golmaal franchise.

== See also ==
- Dhamaal (film series)
- Housefull (film series)
- Welcome (film series)
