= Nazneen (given name) =

Nazneen is a given name. Notable people with the name include:

- Nazneen Contractor (born 1982), Indian-born Canadian actress
- Nazneen Ghaani (active 2005–2014), Indian actress
- Nazneen Patel (born 1945), Indian actress
- Nazneen Rahman, British geneticist
