= Poster Boys (2017 film) =

2017 Indian comedy film

- Theatrical release poster
- Directed by: Shreyas Talpade
- Screenplay by: Paritosh Painter; Bunty Rathore; Shreyas Talpade
- Dialogues by: Bunty Rathore; Paritosh Painter; Anant Ahluwalia
- Story by: Shreyas Talpade
- Based on: Poshter Boyz (2014) by Sameer Patil
- Starring: Sunny Deol; Bobby Deol; Shreyas Talpade; Sonali Kulkarni; Samikssha Batnagar; Tripti Dimri
- Cinematography: Nigam Bomzan
- Edited by: Devendra Murdeshwar
- Music by: Songs: Tanishk Bagchi; Rishi Rich; Sunai Marathe; Shreyas Iyengar; Sonny Ravan; Score: Amar Mohile
- Production companies: Sony Pictures Networks India Private Limited; Sunny Sounds Private Limited; Affluence Movies Private Limited
- Distributed by: Sony Pictures Releasing International
- Release date: 8 September 2017
- Running time: 131 minutes
- Country: India
- Language: Hindi
- Budget: ₹15 crore
- Box office: ₹30 crore

Poster Boys is a 2017 Indian Hindi-language comedy film written, co-produced and directed by Shreyas Talpade in his directorial debut. The film stars Sunny Deol, Bobby Deol and Shreyas Talpade, along with Sonali Kulkarni, Samikssha Batnagar and Tripti Dimri.

The film is an official remake of the Marathi film Poshter Boyz which Talpade himself had produced and acted in. It is inspired by a real-life incident about three porters who found their pictures on a vasectomy poster.

Poster Boys was produced by Sony Pictures Networks Productions, Sunny Sounds and Affluence Movies, and was distributed by Sony Pictures Networks Distribution. It was released on 8 September 2017.

== Plot ==
Three men meet their bad luck for an unknown reason. Arjun Singh proposes to his girlfriend Riya is rejected by her father for "he can't get his daughter married to such a person", leaving Arjun frustrated and upset. Jagavar Chaudhary is married to Sunita. He is preparing his younger sister Anjali's engagement ceremony when he's told that the fiancé and his family have changed their mind of engaging with Anjali for "they cannot accept an alliance with such a shameful family". Vinay Sharma is a primary teacher whose wife Surajmukhi suddenly leaves him and asks for divorce for she cannot forgive his "irresponsible deeds".

The three confused and upset men one day coincidentally meet somewhere on a bridge when they come across a bus that has a poster of their photos, promoting vasectomy, at the back. They come to know that this poster is the reason they are defamed as none of them had that operation and their photos were used without their permission. They decide to find out who is behind it and solve it.

They later find that two government employees from the Health Department, the organizers of that promotion, are responsible for the incident. They find the two employees and ask them to remove all the posters in the city with their unauthorized photos and make a public apology and demand compensation. The two agree but request time to do that.

During the given days, the two do not try to fulfill their promise, but instead ask their senior to help, and their senior, the Health Minister does not try to solve it but to cover it up. At the deadline date, the three can't find the two government employees to fulfill their promise so they turn to their superior for help, who refuses to meet them. The three desperate men then decide to sue the Health Department.

They fail the case because the Health Department used a lot of fake evidence including faked documents showing that they willingly finished the operation and asked to post their photos. But the incident goes viral with help of a local reporter and they are gaining people's support.

During a press conference suggested by the same reporter, angered Arjun announces that they will protest naked if the authority don't give them justice, drawing attention of greater public to this incident.

They start their naked protest at the promised day with only underpants, and people supporting them also uploaded videos of them naked supporting the three's request. The incident finally reaches the Chief Minister, who rushes to the scene to control the situation. The Chief Minister, knowing all the truth behind it, announces that the three are innocent and the Health Department is responsible for the incident and the government will give them compensation.

Riya's father, convinced of Arjun's innocence and moved by his courage, agrees his proposal. Jagavar’s issue gets resolved as Anjali's fiancé agrees to marry her. Vinay's wife returns back to him.

== Cast ==
- Sunny Deol as Jagavar Chaudhary
- Bobby Deol as Vinay Sharma
- Shreyas Talpade as Arjun Singh
- Sonali Kulkarni as Sunita Chaudhary – Jagavar's wife
- Samikssha Batnagar as Surajmukhi Sharma – Vinay's wife
- Tripti Dimri as Riya – Arjun's girlfriend
- Lovely Singh as Anjali Chaudhary – Jagavar‘s sister
- Ashwini Kalsekar as Doctor
- Ajeet Singh as Murari
- Purnima Varma as Aashtha
- Farhana Fatema as Rekha
- Randheer Rai as Anuj Chaudhary
- Raashul Tandon as Reporter
- Dilip Prabhavalkar as old man
- Bharti Achrekar as Amma
- Sachin Khedekar as Chief Minister Jagdev Ahlawat
- Murali Sharma as Health Minister
- Jitendra Joshi as photographer
- Elli Avram as Dancer with Sunny Deol – In the song "Kudiyan Shehar Diyan"
- Dharmendra (cameo appearance) as Amol Sharma
- Ajay Devgn (special appearance) as himself
- Arshad Warsi (special appearance) as himself
- Parineeti Chopra (special appearance) as herself
- Rohit Shetty (special appearance) as himself
- Kunal Khemu (special appearance) as himself
- Tusshar Kapoor (special appearance) as himself

== Music and soundtrack ==
The music for the film’s songs was composed by Tanishk Bagchi, Daler Mehndi, Rishi Rich, Sunai Marathe, Shreyas Iyengar and Sonny Ravan. The lyrics of the songs were penned by Shabbir Ahmed, Kumaar, Saurabh M Pandey, and Sonny Ravan. The background score of the movie was done by Amar Mohile.

Daler Mehndi’s chart-topper song, "Kudiyan Shehar Diyan" (lyrics by Javed Akhtar), from the 1999 hit film Arjun Pandit (originally featuring Juhi Chawla) was recreated for this movie and features Sunny Deol and Elli AvrRam. It was released on 11 August 2017. The second song "Kendhi Menoo" which is sung by Yash Narvekar, Sukriti Kakar and Ikka Singh was released on 18 August 2017. The soundtrack was released on 19 August 2017 by T-Series which consists of only four songs.

Poster Boys

Soundtrack album by Tanishk Bagchi, Daler Mehndi, Rishi Rich, Sunai Marathe, Shreyas Iyengar & Sonny Ravan
- Released: 19 August 2017
- Genre: Feature film soundtrack
- Length: 14:07
- Language: Hindi
- Label: T-Series
- Producer: Bhushan Kumar

Track listing
No.	Title	Lyrics	Music	Singer(s)	Length
1.	"Kudiya Shehar Diyan"	Javed Akhtar, Shabbir Ahmed (additional)	Daler Mehndi, Tanishk Bagchi (recreation)	Daler Mehndi, Neha Kakkar	3:32
2.	"Kendhi Menoo"	Kumaar	Rishi Rich	Yash Narvekar, Sukriti Kakar, Ikka Singh	3:45
3.	"Noor E Khuda"	Saurabh M Pandey	Sunai Marathe, Shreyas Iyengar	Kailash Kher	3:27
4.	"The Poster Boys Anthem"	Sonny Ravan	Sonny Ravan & Shree D	Shree D	3:23
Total length:					14:07
