= Golmaal: Fun Unlimited =

2006 Indian film by Rohit Shetty

- Theatrical release poster
- Directed by: Rohit Shetty
- Written by: Neeraj Vora
- Based on: Ghar Ghar by Harsh Shivsharan
- Produced by: Dhilin Mehta; Parag Sanghvi
- Starring: Ajay Devgn; Arshad Warsi; Tusshar Kapoor; Sharman Joshi; Rimi Sen; Paresh Rawal
- Cinematography: Aseem Bajaj
- Edited by: Steven Bernard
- Music by: Songs: Vishal–Shekhar; Score: Sanjoy Chowdhury
- Production companies: Shree Ashtavinayak Cine Vision; K Sera Sera
- Distributed by: Eros International
- Release date: 14 July 2006
- Running time: 142 minutes
- Country: India
- Language: Hindi
- Budget: ₹15 crore
- Box office: ₹41.25 crore

Golmaal: Fun Unlimited (lit. 'Chaos: Fun Unlimited') is a 2006 Indian Hindi-language buddy comedy film directed by Rohit Shetty, written by Neeraj Vora, and produced by Dhilin Mehta under Shree Ashtavinayak Cine Vision Limited and Parag Sanghvi under K. Sera Sera Limited. The first installment of the Golmaal film series, it stars Ajay Devgn, Arshad Warsi, Tusshar Kapoor and Sharman Joshi along with Rimi Sen and Paresh Rawal. Golmaal was released on 14 July 2006.

It is said to be loosely based on Harsh Shivsharan's Marathi play Ghar Ghar, which also inspired Vora's Gujarati play Aflatoon, in turn one of the inspirations for the film. Upon release, the film received mixed-to-positive reviews from critics. The film was commercially successful, grossing ₹41.25 crore worldwide against a budget of ₹15 crore.

== Plot ==
Laxman is a brilliant student who is distracted from his studies by his mischievous band of friends, Gopal, Madhav, and Lucky. The group share a room despite Laxman's friends being suspended from the college for over 10 years. Gopal is the muscle of the group, Madhav is the brain, and Lucky is mute. The foursome is indebted to a criminal garage owner named Vasooli, who is constantly pursuing them. They use Laxman's hostel room for their mischief.

Laxman is peer-pressured into running a series of scams to earn himself and his friends some money, throwing them out of college. During a short halt in the woods during the night, each one of them reveals their past. Laxman's mother used to work as a maid for a government officer. Madhav had a rough childhood, having been a witness to constant fighting between his parents. Lucky's father abandoned him and his mother and remarried. Lucky's stepsiblings used to ridicule his mutism. Gopal reveals that he is an orphan who was raised in the Jamnadas Orphanage. Vasooli and his gang track down the group in the woods and chase them. The group finds refuge in the bungalow of a blind couple, Somnath and Mangala, who are waiting for their grandson, Sameer, to inherit his paternal grandparents' treasure chest hidden in the old couple's house. Gopal pretends to be Sameer returning from America and enters the house, while the other three friends sneak in hidden. A cat-and-mouse game unfolds as Laxman's body and Gopal's voice make up Sameer. Meanwhile, Nirali, a beautiful girl-next-door, arrives and the group attempts to charm her. Meanwhile, a gangster named Babli wants to steal the chest from the couple's bungalow, but all of his men's attempts are unintentionally thwarted by the foursome.

The foursome finds the chest hidden behind an old painting in the house, despite Laxman pleading not to open it. Somnath then appears and opens the chest, which contains four items: a compass box, a toy gun, a toy car and an urn containing ashes, which Somnath reveals to be Sameer's ashes; the real Sameer, along with his parents, were killed in a car crash on their way to India to meet his grandparents, after Somnath's son learned that Somnath and Mangala were permanently blinded in a separate accident. Somnath, with help from his friend, a police commissioner, went to America and lit the pyres of his son, daughter-in-law and grandson, and kept their ashes in the urn, which he kept in the chest. Mangala overhears the entire story, condemning her husband for lying to her all those years and not allowing her to cradle her grandson or light the pyres, while also criticising the foursome for tricking them. Babli then arrives with his gang and reveals that he hid diamonds in the urn Somnath was carrying as he returned to India. Pandurang, an assassin previously sent by Babli who used to work as the blind couple's servant, later joins Gopal's side on hearing about Sameer's truth and helps fight the gangsters off, with Vasooli getting caught in the commotion after finally tracking the foursome to the blind couple's house. The fight ends with Gopal being accidentally stabbed by Babli with a knife when the latter attempts to attack the blind couple, and falls unconscious soon after, but not before warning Madhav, Lucky and Laxman not to touch the knife, leaving the three friends in laughter. Babli also falls unconscious after seeing blood flowing from Gopal's butt.

After being admitted to a hospital, Gopal has the knife removed, and Babli is arrested. Laxman, Gopal, Madhav and Lucky are then rewarded with ten per cent of the original value of the diamonds for arresting Babli. Nirali then chooses Lucky as her husband-to-be, saying that she wants a partner who only listens to her, and she found true love and loyalty in him alone, leaving the other three disappointed.

== Cast ==
- Ajay Devgn as Gopal "Gopu" Kumar Santoshi, who voices the fake Sameer Bhardwaj
- Arshad Warsi as Madhav Singh Ghai
- Tusshar Kapoor as Lucky Gill
- Sharman Joshi as Laxman Prasad Sharma, who acts as the fake Sameer's body
- Rimi Sen as Nirali
- Paresh Rawal as Somnath Bhardwaj, Sameer's grandfather.
- Sushmita Mukherjee as Mangala Bhardwaj, Sameer's grandmother.
- Manoj Joshi as Harishchandra Ramchandra Mirchandani a.k.a. HaRaMi, Dean of Laxman's institute.
- Mukesh Tiwari as Vasooli
- Sanjay Mishra as Babli Bhai, a don
- Farid Amiri as Monty, Nirali's friend.
- Vrajesh Hirjee as Pandu Ranga, Somnath and Managala's ex-servant
- Siddharth Jadhav as Sattu Supari, Babli Bhai's contract killer.

== Release ==
=== Critical reception ===
Sukanya Verma of Rediff said the film was "one wacky, goofy, paisa vasool ride" and that "the humour isn't exactly family audience material, and is more likely to be lapped up by college-going folk", rating the film three out of 5. Subhash K Jha of Sify wrote that "Golmaal's neatly structured ambit of asinine anarchy tickles the funny-bone, but it finally says nothing about the quality of modern life that we haven't already heard in all those blasts from the past that have come in recent weeks trying to create a ripple across our sense of humour." Taran Adarsh of Bollywood Hungama said that "Golmaal is a thoroughly enjoyable fare, the film has all it takes to hit the bull's eye" rating it 3.5/5.

=== Box office ===
Golmaal grossed ₹41.25 crore (US$4.3 million) worldwide. At the end of its run, Golmaal was considered a success. It was declared a hit at the box office grossing about 290 million on a budget of 12 million.

== Impact ==
Shortly after the film's release, Microsoft's video messenger platform Skype decided to include an emoji for Golmaal as well as several other Hindi film emojis in an effort to appeal to users in India and to honor Indian culture.

== Soundtrack ==
Golmaal: Fun Unlimited

Soundtrack album by Vishal–Shekhar
- Released: 14 June 2006 (Film)
- Recorded: 2006
- Genre: Feature Film soundtrack
- Length: 45:46
- Labels: Venus Music; T-Series
- Producer: Vishal–Shekhar

Vishal–Shekhar chronology
| Tathastu (2006) | Golmaal: Fun Unlimited (2006) | I See You (2006) |

The film's soundtrack is composed by Vishal–Shekhar, with lyrics by Kumaar; Vishal Dadlani wrote the lyrics for "Aage Peeche".

| Song | Singer(s) |
|---|---|
| "Golmaal" (Title Track) | Anushka Manchanda, Vishal Dadlani |
| "Aage Peeche" | Shekhar Ravjiani, Sneha Pant |
| "Mast Malang" | Kunal Ganjawala, Vishal Dadlani |
| "Rehja Re" | Javed Ali & Sunidhi Chauhan |
| "Golmaal O O" | Shaan & KK, Vishal Dadlani |
| "Golmaal" (Remix by Akbar Sami) | Anushka Manchanda, Vishal Dadlani |
| "Aage Peeche" (Remix by Akbar Sami) | Shekhar Ravjiani, Sneha Pant |
| "Rehja Re" (Remix by Akbar Sami) | Javed Ali & Sunidhi Chauhan |
| "Golmaal O O" (Remix by Akbar Sami) | Shaan & KK, Vishal Dadlani |
| "Golmaal" (Theme) | Instrumental |

== Sequel ==
The film spawned a sequel titled Golmaal Returns, which released on 29 October 2008. The sequel received mixed reviews from critics but had a bumper opening in India and grossed a total more than the original, and was a box office success. On 5 November 2010, the third sequel titled Golmaal 3 was released. The film was declared a box office success, and was the highest-grossing installment in the Golmaal film series until the fourth, Golmaal Again, released on 20 October 2017. All three films were released on or around the Diwali weekends.
