= Bachche Kachche Sachche =

- Directed by: Ravi Sadasiv
- Starring: Ashish Vidyarthi; Mukesh Tiwari; Anna Hazare; Bhavesh Babani
- Release date: 9 June 2017
- Country: India

Bachche Kachche Sachche (transl. Children, unfinished and true) is an Indian drama film directed by Ravi Sadasiv and starring Ashish Vidyarthi and Mukesh Tiwari. It was released on 9 June 2017.

== Cast ==
- Aryan Kataria as Ganesh
- Ashish Vidyarthi as Tripati
- Mukesh Tiwari as Rana
- Bhavesh Babani
