= Mukesh Tiwari =

Indian actor (born 1969)

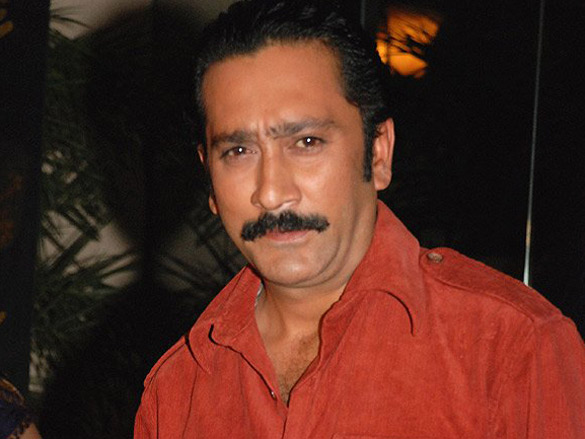
- Born: 24 August 1969 (age 57); Sagar, Madhya Pradesh, India
- Occupation: Actor
- Years active: 1998–present
- Spouse: Violet Nazir Tiwari
- Children: 1

Mukesh Tiwari is an Indian actor, who has worked predominantly in Bollywood and few Tamil, Punjabi, Kannada and Telugu films. He is known for playing negative and comic side roles. He graduated from National School of Drama in 1994. He entered the film industry in the year 1998 with the movie China Gate. He is known for his works in The Legend of Bhagat Singh, Gangaajal and Golmaal as Vasooli.

== Early life and education ==
Mukesh Tiwari was born on 24 August 1969 in Sagar, Madhya Pradesh, India. He grew up in a modest family; his father died when he was young, and his mother raised him on her own.

After finishing school in a Hindi-medium institution, he joined the National School of Drama (NSD) in New Delhi, where he initially struggled with English and often relied on classmates for help.

After completing his training, Tiwari moved to Mumbai to pursue an acting career. He has spoken about how he had to borrow money from a friend to make the journey, and how those hardships shaped his humility and empathy for others.

Despite being known for his on-screen villainous roles, Tiwari is recognized off-screen for his philanthropic activities and charitable contributions, often assisting individuals from his hometown of Sagar and other under-privileged communities.

He has stated in interviews that his early struggles and a period of unemployment following his debut in China Gate (1998) taught him patience and perseverance.

== Family ==
Mukesh Tiwari is married to Violet Nazir Tiwari, an Assamese actress whom he met in NSD. The couple have one child.

Tiwari generally keeps his family life private, rarely appearing with them in public events or interviews. He has said in several interactions that he prefers to keep the media’s focus on his acting career rather than his personal matters.

== Filmography ==
- All films in Hindi language unless specified otherwise

Key
†	Denotes films that have not yet been released

List of Mukesh Tiwari film credits
Year	Film	Role	Notes
1998	China Gate	Jageera	
2000	Hum Panchhi Ek Daal Ke		
2000	Refugee	Tausif	
2000	Aaghaaz	Danny Mendoza	
2000	Vamsi	Charan Singh	Telugu film
2001	Farz	Sikandar	
2001	Mitti	Pagla Jaan	
2001	Pandavar Bhoomi		Tamil film
2002	Aap Mujhe Achche Lagne Lage	Raman Dholakia	
2002	Jaan Pe Khelenge Hum	Marlon	
2002	The Legend of Bhagat Singh	Jailor	
2002	Kuch Tum Kaho Kuch Hum Kahein	Narendra Pratap	
2002	Pyaasa		
2003	Dhund – The Fog		
2003	Hawa	Psychiatrist-Exorcist (Tantrik)	
2003	Hawayien		
2003	Gangaajal	Bachcha Yadav	
2003	Zameen	Baba Zaheer	
2003	Patth		
2003	Dil Pardesi Ho Gayaa	Tabrez Baig	
2003	LOC Kargil	Lt Col A Asthana	
2003	Relax	2003	
2004	Hawas	Cop	
2004	Dukaan – The Body Shop	Inspector Gokhale	
2004	Taarzan – The Wonder Car	Kailash Chopra	
2004	Kuchh Kaha Aapne		
2005	Yehi Hai Zindagi	Pintya	
2005	Tango Charlie	Pakistan Army Officer	
2005	Shabnam Mausi	Madan Pandit	
2005	D	Mukesh	
2005	Yahaan	Major Rathod	
2005	Mangal Pandey - The Rising	Bakht Khan	
2005	Kasak	Ronak Singh	
2005	Apaharan	SP Anwar Khan	
2006	Humko Tumse Pyaar Hai		
2006	Thalaimagan	Shanmuga vadivelu	Tamil film
2006	Teesri Aankh – The Hidden Camera	Dinesh	
2006	Jigyaasa	Ksamaal Hussain	
2006	Ho Sakta Hai	Kushaba	
2006	Aatma		
2006	Ek Zakhm – The Blast	Jai	
2006	Alag	Mr. Singh	
2006	Hot Money	Inspector Arjun Chaudhary	
2006	Golmaal	Vasooli Bhai	
2006	Kachchi Sadak		
2007	Pokkiri	Inspector Govindraj	Tamil film
2007	Undertrial	Nadir Saab	
2007	Miss Anara		
2007	Buddha Mar Gaya	Sameer	
2008	My Name Is Anthony Gonsalves	Maqsood	
2008	Halla Bol		
2008	Golden Boys	Dogra	
2008	Deshdrohi	Rajan Naik	
2008	Sunday	Anwar	
2008	One Two Three	Papa, D'Mello Yadav	
2008	Haal-E-Dil	Speedy Singh	
2008	Golmaal Returns	Vasooli	
2008	Desh Drohi	Rajan Naik	
2009	Lottery	Raja Thakur	
2009	Team: The Force		
2009	Raftaar – An Obsession	Iqbal Khan	
2009	Shortkut		
2009	Kanthaswamy	Rajmohan	Tamil film
2009	Baabarr	Nawaz Qureshi	
2009	All The Best	Chauthala	
2010	Atithi Tum Kab Jaoge?	Inspector	
2010	Kuchh Kariye	Banda Nawaz	
2010	Krantiveer – The Revolution		
2010	Hello Darling	Inspector Eagle	
2010	Golmaal 3	Vasooli	
2010	No Problem	DC - Marcos Gang Member	
2010	Payback	Pakya	
2010	Toonpur Ka Superhero	DCP Kitkite	
2011	Hostel	Feroz	
2011	Dil Toh Baccha Hai Ji	Mr. Tiwari	Special Appearance
2011	Thank You	King	
2011	Bin Bulaye Baarati	Gajraj	
2011	Always Kabhi Kabhi	Shekhawat	
2011	Aarakshan	Police Inspector	
2012	Gangs of Wasseypur		Special Appearance
2012	Upanishad Ganga	Various characters	TV series
2012	Chakravyuh	Inspector General of Police (IGP)	
2012	Son of Sardar	Guest	
2012	Khiladi 786	Jailer	
2013	Love Kiya Aur Lag Gayi		
2013	Bloody Isshq	Officer Vikram Rathore	
2013	Policegiri	Padam	
2013	Chennai Express	Shamsher Singh	
2013	Bin Phere Free Me Ttere		
2013	Phata Poster Nikla Hero	Napoleon	
2013	Boss	Inspector	
2014	Chal Bhaag	Kishan	
2014	Chaarfutiya Chhokare	Baal Kishan	
2014	18.11 - A Code of Secrecy	Kuldeep Sharma	
2014	Poojai	Anna Thandavam	Tamil film
2015	Anegan	Burmaa and Radhakrishnan	Tamil film
2015	Dilwale	Shakti	
2015	Second Hand Husband	Pammi's Husband	
2015	Gun & Goal	Johra	Punjabi film
2016	Awesome Mausam	Heroine Father	
2016	Kotigobba 2 / Mudinja Ivana Pudi	Rich businessman	Kannada/Tamil film
2017	Golmaal Again	Vasooli	
2017	Bhouri	Manager	
2017	Thodi Thodi Si Manmaaniyan	Ajay Kaul	
2017	Bachche Kachche Sachche	Rana	
2017	Jora 10 Numbaria	Sultan Ahmed Qureshi	Punjabi film; Directed by Amardeep Singh Gill
2017	Anjani Putra	Bairava	Kannada film
2018	Nawabzaade	Raghavan Ghatge	
2018	Mohini	Vicky (KVR)	Tamil film
2019	72 Hours: Martyr Who Never Died	Hawaldar CM Singh	
2019	Pagalpanti	B aba Jani	
2020	Jhansi I.P.S		Kannada film
2021	Pon Manickavel	Motilal Seth	Tamil film
2022	Cirkus	Daaku Bagheera	
2023	Garmi	Dilbag	
2023	Bawaal	MLA Vishwas Raghuvanshi	
2023	Scam 2003	Suryapratap Gehlot	TV series on SonyLIV
2023	The Purvanchal Files		
2024	695		
2024	Bhimaa	Bhavani	Telugu film
2024	Vicky Vidya Ka Woh Wala Video	Sajjan Kumar	
2025	Ground Zero	Sanjeev Sharma	
2025	One Two Cha Cha Chaa	Inspector Yadav	Hindi film
2026	Bhabiji Ghar Par Hain! Fun on the Run	Kranti Sharma	
2026	Welcome to the Jungle	Rangwa	
2026	Ramayana: Part 1	Agastya	
