= Maarrich =

- Directed by: Dhruv Lather
- Written by: Dhruv Lather
- Produced by: Tusshar Kapoor; Narendra Hirawat; Shreyans Hirawat
- Starring: Tusshar Kapoor; Anita Hassanandani; Naseeruddin Shah; Rahul Dev; Seerat Kapoor
- Cinematography: Ravi Yadav
- Edited by: Ballu Saluja
- Music by: Amaal Mallik; Vishal Mishra
- Production companies: Tusshar Entertainment House; NH Studioz
- Release date: 9 December 2022
- Running time: 121 minutes
- Country: India
- Language: Hindi

Maarrich is a 2022 Indian Hindi-language crime-thriller film written and directed by Dhruv Lather. Produced by Tusshar Kapoor, Narendra Hirawat and Shreyans Hirawat under the banner of Tusshar Entertainment House and NH Studioz. It stars Tusshar Kapoor, Anita Hassanandani, Naseeruddin Shah, Rahul Dev and Seerat Kapoor in her film debut.

== Cast ==
- Tusshar Kapoor as Rajiv Dixit
- Anita Hassanandani as Sushmita Dixit
- Naseeruddin Shah as Lobo
- Rahul Dev as Anthony
- Seerat Kapoor as Reena
- Taiyaba Mansuri as Ashram girl
- Dipannita Sharma as Shalini Mehta
- Aakash Dahiya as Mahesh
- Manvir Singh
- Chelsha Gosai as Lisa

== Production ==
The principal photography of the film started in 2021. The film marks the third collaboration between Tusshar Kapoor and Anita Hassanandani after Kucch To Hai and Yeh Dil both released in (2003).

== Soundtrack ==
Maarrich

Soundtrack album by Amaal Mallik and Vishal Mishra
- Released: 2022
- Recorded: 2021
- Genre: Feature film soundtrack
- Length: 10:00
- Language: Hindi
- Label: Tips Industries

The film's music is composed by Amaal Mallik and Vishal Mishra while lyrics were penned by Vishal Mishra, Kaushal Kishore and Rashmi Virag. The first single "Na Boond" was released on 26 November 2022. The second single "Deewana" was released on 1 December 2022. The third single "Jaa Ne Jaa" was released on 6 December 2022.

Track listing
No.	Title	Lyrics	Singer(s)	Length
1.	"Deewana"	Vishal Mishra	Vishal Mishra	2:49
2.	"Jaa Ne Jaa"	Rashmi Virag	Sunidhi Chauhan	3:24
3.	"Na Boond"	Kaushal Kishore	Vishal Mishra	3:47
Total length:				10:00

== Release ==
Maarrich was released theatrically on 9 December 2022.

== Reception ==
The film was reviewed by News18 and The Times of India.

== See also ==
- List of Hindi films of 2022
