= Dhol (film) =

2007 Indian film by Priyadarshan

- Theatrical release poster
- Directed by: Priyadarshan
- Written by: Manisha Korde
- Story by: Suresh Krishnan
- Based on: In Harihar Nagar by Siddique-Lal
- Produced by: Shailendra Singh Satish Kaushik
- Starring: Tusshar Kapoor; Sharman Joshi; Kunal Khemu; Rajpal Yadav; Tanushree Dutta; Om Puri; Arbaaz Khan; Abhimanyu Singh; Payal Rohatgi; Murali Sharma; Asrani; Tiku Talsania
- Cinematography: Piyush Shah
- Edited by: N. Gopalakrishnan; Arun Kumar
- Music by: Songs: Pritam; Score: Gopi Sunder
- Production company: Percept Picture Company
- Distributed by: Adlabs
- Release date: 21 September 2007
- Running time: 145 minutes
- Country: India
- Language: Hindi
- Budget: ₹ 14 crore
- Box office: ₹ 33.27 crore

Dhol (Drum) is a 2007 Indian Hindi-language buddy comedy thriller film directed by Priyadarshan and produced by Percept Picture Company. A remake of the 1990 Malayalam film In Harihar Nagar, which was already remade in Hindi in 1992 as Parda Hai Parda, the film stars Tusshar Kapoor, Sharman Joshi, Kunal Khemu, Rajpal Yadav, Tanushree Dutta, and Om Puri in lead roles, whilst Arbaaz Khan, Abhimanyu Singh, Payal Rohatgi, Murali Sharma, Asrani and Tiku Talsania feature in supporting roles. Released on 21 September 2007, it received mixed responses from critics upon release and succeeded at the box office.

== Plot ==
Martand "Maru" Dhamdere, Pankaj "Pakya" Tiwari, Sameer "Sam" Arya, and Gautam "Goti" Sisodia are roommates in Pune who are bound together by their ambition to make it big in life with the least effort possible. Each one tries his hand at finding a shortcut to success but ends up being in even deeper trouble. Things get worse when the four decide to take some desperate measures to end their misery once and for all. They take loans from Martand's maternal uncle at very high interest.

They believe the only way to get rich without working hard is to marry a wealthy girl. As luck would have it, a rich girl named Ritu arrives in their neighborhood with her grandparents. All four set out with their individual plans to marry her but end up discovering a shocking truth. Ritu came to the city to find out about her brother's, Rahul, killers.

All four of them try to impress Ritu, and they discover that Rahul died along with his friend Jaishankar "Jai" Yadav. They try hard, and finally, Pankaj decides to marry Ritu. Soon before marriage, Ritu finds the secret that Rahul and Jai were in contact with a notorious gang leader, Zikomo. Ritu finds that the four were bluffing all the time just to impress her, and so she starts avoiding them.

One day Zikomo finds them and kidnaps Ritu and her grandparents. He asks for them to hand over a drum he has been after (which got Rahul and Jai into trouble in the first place) if they want to see him alive, but Ritu's family members do not know about any drum. He confesses to killing Rahul and Jai. A fight ensues and Zikomo is killed in a self-explosion in the end. Meanwhile, Ritu hands over the drum, and the four of them find it filled with money, realizing that Zikomo was after the money and not the drum. They run behind Ritu's car after she leaves, as the film ends.

== Cast ==
- Tusshar Kapoor as Sameer "Sam" Arya
- Sharman Joshi as Pankaj "Pakya" Tiwari/ Pankaj Jaywardhan / Fake 'Jai'
- Kunal Khemu as Gautam "Goti" Sisodia
- Rajpal Yadav as Martand "Maru" Kavdu Dhamdhere
- Tanushree Dutta as Ritu Jayantilal Tripathi
- Om Puri as Dr. Satyadev Tripathi (PhD in Textiles), Ritu's Grandfather
- Arbaaz Khan as Jaishankar "Jai" Yadav
- Murli Sharma as Zhalim 'Zikomo' Singh
- Payal Rohatgi as Sophie Andrew Strauss; Jai's Fiancé to be
- Abhimanyu Singh as Rahul S. Tripathi, Ritu's brother
- Baby Farida as Elizabeth Tripathi, Ritu's grandmother
- Asrani as Sunil Ashoke Nahata, Pakya's brother in-law
- Tiku Talsania as Assistant Sub Inspector Subhash Anandrao Dongre (Mama), Maru's miser Maternal uncle
- Tareena Patel as Kanika Bose
- Ajay Purkar as Ordinary Goon
- Rasika Joshi as Landlady Brinda J. Bose
- Prerna Arora as Mal in "Haadsa" song

== Soundtrack ==
Dhol

Soundtrack album by Pritam
- Released: 2007 (India)
- Recorded: 2007
- Genre: Feature film soundtrack
- Label: T-Series
- Producer: Pritam

Pritam chronology
Life In A... Metro (2007)	Dhol (2007)	Awarapan (2007)

=== Track listing ===
Track	Singer(s)	Duration	Lyrics
"Oh Yaara Dhol Bajake"	Mika Singh, Labh Janjua	4:12	Irshad Kamil
"Namakool Namakool"	Shaan, Kunal Ganjawala	5:00	Ashish Pandit
"Dhol Bajake" (Version 2)	Labh Janjua	4:28	Irshad Kamil
"Haadsa"	Sunidhi Chauhan, Akriti Kakkar	5:11	Irshad Kamil
"Bheega Aasman"	Shaan, Vijay Yesudas	5:32	Irshad Kamil
"All Night Long"	Usha Uthup	4:16	Mayur Puri
"Dil Liya Re"	Shreya Ghoshal	5:14	Amitabh Verma
"Dhol Bajake" (Version 3)	Soham Chakraborty, Suhail Kaul	4:11	Irshad Kamil

== Reception ==
Taran Adarsh of Bollywood Hungama gave the film 3 stars out of 5, writing ″On the whole, DHOL is a decent entertainer that has some really funny comic moments. At the box-office, the Priyadarshan brand should ensure impressive footfalls at cineplexes despite the dull period and coupled with its moderate pricing, DHOL should find a place in the director's successful films.″ Syed Firdaus Ashraf of Rediff.com gave the film 2.5 stars out of 5 calling it ″funny in parts.″

Rajeev Masand gave the film 1 star out of 5, writing ″I'm going with one out of five and a suggestion to stay far, far away from Priyadarshan's Dhol. The one star is for the smattering of genuine comedy you're likely to find here, the rest is just indifferent film-making, an insult to your intelligence. You know, every time I walk out of the cinema after watching a Priyadarshan film, I feel like he can't make a film worse than this. And every single time, he surprises me by surpassing his previous achievement.″
