= Kya Mast Hai Life =

Indian teen sitcom television series

- Genre: Teen sitcom
- Written by: Karan Agarwal; Tanmay Bhat
- Directed by: Aarif Shamsi; Siladitya Sen
- Starring: Nazneen Ghaani; Shaheer Sheikh; Sana Amin Sheikh; Ashish Juneja; Shweta Tripathi; Manini Mishra
- Opening theme: "Kya Mast Mast Hai Life" by Sangeeth Haldipur and Vasudha Varma
- Country of origin: India
- Original language: Hindi
- No. of seasons: 2
- No. of episodes: 130

Production
- Running time: 20-25 minutes
- Production company: Sol Productions

Original release
- Network: Disney Channel
- Release: 27 April 2009 – 4 July 2010

Kya Mast Hai Life is an Indian teen sitcom television series which ran on Disney Channel India from 27 April 2009 to 7 July 2010. The series produced by Sol Productions had 130 episodes. The show focused on the lives of five college friends: Ragini ('Rags'), Zeeshan ('Zee'), Zenia, Ritu ('Rits') and Vir.

== Plot ==
The show revolves around five college friends and their daily comical lives.

=== Season 1 ===
Ragini "Rags" Juneja is the 16 year old daughter of Bollywood megastar Sushmita Juneja, about to join Redfield Academy junior college after 10 years of boarding school. Wary of people befriending her only for her status again, she makes the decision to hide her wealth and fame. Her mother doesn’t understand her concerns and Rags has to go as far as threatening her body guard with false allegations of laziness to get him to not follow her into school.

At Redfield, she meets a band of inseparable childhood friends: Zenia Khan, a fiery girl, her twin brother Zeeshan ‘Zee’ Khan, a hopeless flirt, Vir Mehra, whose parents want him to become a doctor like them despite his hemophobia, and Ritu Shah, who is called BBB which stands for ‘Bin Baadal Barsaat’ (rain without clouds) for her tendency to burst into tears.

Zenia and Ritu look down upon the school’s most popular girls, known as the Teen Titliya (Three Butterflies) for being materialistic and snobbish. To avoid being alienated by her new friends, Rags lies to them, saying her mom is a kindergarten teacher and that she is a poor singer, despite her being excellent at singing. She also falsely claims her expensive clothes are cheap imitations to repel the attentions of the Teen Titliya.

Her friends eventually find out her secrets and, while initially angry, they ultimately forgive her.

=== Season 2 ===
The events of the second season take place during summer vacations. Zee works at a bookstore in which Mr. Mandal is temporarily in charge. Ritu is shown to be in Ahmedabad. Zee and Zenia's mother is introduced. The season starts with Zee discovering a magic potion that makes the last thoughts of the characters come true. When Ritu returns, Ragini, Zee, Zenia, and Vir have a wonderful adventure with the magic potion. But when they visit Ragini in Thailand, the magic potion turns out to be a ghost who wants to take revenge on the gang because of a mistake Zee made. Zee eventually defeats him, and they celebrate Ragini's birthday happily. They all breathe a sigh of relief thinking that the magic potion which had caused them so much trouble was gone, but it is actually back in Zee's bag. The series ends with a triumphant episode and it says that the five will be best friends forever.

It has 26 episodes.

== Cast ==
=== Main ===
- Nazneen Ghaani as Ragini Juneja aka "Rags" : Rags describes herself as an ‘Ameer baap ki bhigdi hui (wealthy father’s spoiled) rich spoiled girl (sic)’. Despite the self criticism Rags is conscious of the class difference between the average teen and herself, and is desperate to blend in to avoid being befriended by flatterers and leeches. Her mother Sushmita is an megastar and father Ravi Juneja is a multimillionaire. She has a paternal grandmother named Radha Juneja. Rags is best friend to Zenia and Zee and goes on to date Vir.
- Shaheer Sheikh as Vir Mehra: He is Rags' boyfriend. He calls Zee his "chuddy buddy" best friend as they have known each other since they were in diapers and underpants (chuddies). His parents are Dr. Mehra and Dr. Panchi Mehra. The doctor couple want their son to follow in their footsteps, for which reason he is the only one among the group to enroll in the science department despite his hemophobia that causes him to faint at the sight of blood. He has an aunt in the army named Anita. Ramu kaka (uncle) is his caretaker.
- Sana Amin Sheikh as Ritu Shah aka "BBB" (Bin Baadal Barsaat)/"Rits": She is a sensitive, sweet and girly girl who usually wears ethnic prints and patterns. Ritu lives in a joint, traditional family. She has a cousin nicknamed Guddi and a cousin named Paresh Bhai. She had a crush on Vir but later fell in love with Aryan.
- Ashish Juneja as Zeeshan Khan aka " Zee": is Zenia's twin brother. He likes flashy, hip hop culture inspired clothing and attempts to flirt with girls only to comically fail. The twins’ mother is Zarina Khan. Zee dates Kimmy.
  - Amey Pandya as Young Zee
- Shweta Tripathi as Zenia Khan: An outspoken, feisty young girl who isn’t afraid of voicing her opinions on anyone or picking a fight. Despite her confident attitude she has worries of school popularity on mind and gives Rags advice on being cool: ‘Don’t do what teachers tell you to do, do what everyone else is doing, be yourself.’ She also hates the Teen Titliya with a passion. Zenia goes out with Jango.

=== Recurring ===
- Vishakha Dugarh as Kimmy: She is the leader of the Teen Titliya. Despite her initial snobbish and classist attitude that kept her from socialising outside her posse, she used to harbour a crush on Vir before realising her love for Zee and dating him. She is very fashionable and charismatic, earning her the loyalty of the student body and especially her two fellow Titliya who always match her choice of clothing colour. Her catchphrase is ‘How downmarket!’
- Manini Mishra as Sushmita Juneja: Rags mother. She is a mega filmstar and film producer Ravi Juneja's wife.
- Sumana Das as Riya: She is a member of the Titliya. She is loyal and fawns upon Kimmy.
- Romy Gupta as Liya: She used to be in the Titliya. She was the replacement for Tiya.
- Reena Aggarwal as Tiya: She used to be a Titli, but later she left abroad for further studies.
- Anamika Bhalla as Diya : She is a Titli. She is the replacement for Liya.
- Sonali Sachdev as Ms. Sandra D'Souza: She is the dramatics teacher of Redfield Academy. She often gets into fights with Mr. Mandal, although she likes him. Her idol is Shakespeare.
- Bhuvnesh Shetty as
  - Mr. Priyanshu Mandal: the Hindi teacher of Redfield Academy. His favorite student is Ritu Shah. He speaks in pure Hindi. He fights with Ms. D'souza, although he also likes her. He is also a big fan of Sushmita Juneja (Rags Mom).
  - Himanshu Mandal aka H.M Mandal: He is a retired principal of a college and Mr. Mandal's father.
- Manmauji Mishra as Ramu Kaka: He is Vir's caretaker. He is very caring to Vir and his friends.
- Prabal Panjabi as Jankidas Govind aka "Jango": He is the college bully, who used to especially bully Zee due to a misconception during Vir's birthday. He is Zenia's boyfriend. He is a very good friend to Disco, the canteen manager.
- Rajesh Jais as Mr. Babyswhar a.k.a. 'Baby Sir': He is the principal of Redfield Academy. He is a fun-loving principal who believes in magic. He often gives lessons to the best friend's gang in different kinds of ways.
- Rajatdeep Singh Sandhu as Disco: the canteen manager of Redfield Academy. He is quite friendly to his customers. He is a very good friend to Jango.
- Iqbal Khan as Mr. Chotu: Rags bodyguard. He does not speak because he has a voice like a rat. Zee has only heard his voice. He and Zee are friends after that.
- Devansh Doshi as Paresh Bhai: He is Ritu's cousin, he often irritates her and the gang. But sometimes he turned out to be helpful too. He is a world-class dandiya champion. He speaks in a Gujarati tone.
- Rohit Vijay Bhardwaj as Aryan: He is Ritu's Boyfriend. He is a Mathematics Olympiad Champion.
- Hiten Tejwani as Mr. Singhania
- Mihir Mishra as Mr. Mehra: He is Vir's father, a doctor who wants to make his son a doctor. But Vir wants to be a musician, which leads them into arguments.
- Sadhana Sharma as Panchi Mehra: Vir's mother.
- Delnaaz Irani as Mrs. Zarina Khan : Zeeshan and Zenia's mother.
- Alan Kapoor as Buzz Sharma
- Vishal Malhotra as Maya Mantar

== Soundtrack ==
Kya Mast Hai Life Original Sound Track

Soundtrack album by Aasma Band
- Released: 17 April 2009
- Genre: Teen Sitcom; Soundtrack
- Language: Hindi; English
- Label: Disney India
- Producer: Sandip Sickand

Kya Mast Hai Lofe: Tracklisting
No.	Title	Artist	Length
1.	"Kya Mast Hai Life"	Sangeeth Haldipur, Vasudha Varma	2:45
2.	"Yeh Pal Jo Meethe Pal!"	Sangeeth Haldipur, Vasudha Varma	2:35
3.	"Saath Saath Rahe Forever"	Sangeeth Haldipur, Vasudha Varma	3:25
4.	"Yaadien"	Sana Amin Sheikh	3:11
5.	"Love Is In The Air"	Sangeeth Haldipur, Vasudha Varma	4:32
6.	"Abhi Abhi (The Titli Song)"		0:40
7.	"Life Ek Fest Hai"	Aasma Band	3:55
8.	"Rags Ko Vote"	Aasma Band	0:30
9.	"She Tops the Coolio Chart"	Sangeeth Haldipur, Vasudha Varma	0:30
Total length:			22:25

== Accolades ==
Year	Award	Category	Recipient(s)	Result
2009	Indian Telly Awards	Popular Kid's Programme	Kya Mast Hai life	Nominated

== See also ==
- List of Disney Channel (India) series
