= Screen Award for Best Comedian =

Annual film award in India

Screen Award for Best performance in a Comic Role
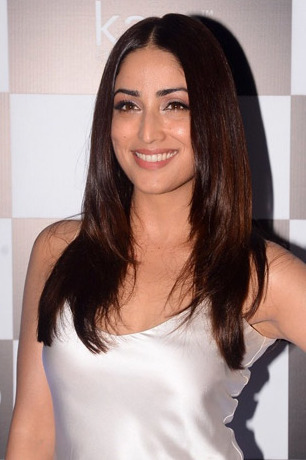
- The 2020 recipient: Yami Gautam
- Awarded for: Award for Best performance in a Comic Role
- Country: India
- Presented by: Screen India
- First award: Kader Khan, Taqdeerwala (1996)
- Currently held by: Yami Gautam, Bala (2020)

The Screen Award for Best Comedian is chosen by a distinguished panel of judges from the Indian Bollywood film industry and the winners are announced in January. The award was further extended when they included a separate female category for performance in a comedian role, although this was only given once in 1996.

== Multiple wins ==
Wins	Recipient
2	Paresh Rawal
2	Abhishek Bachchan
2	Varun Dhawan

== Winners ==
Year	Winner	Film	Ref.
1996	Kader Khan	Taqdeerwala	
1997	Johnny Lever; Sulabha Arya	Raja Hindustani; Masoom	
1998	–	–	
1999	Archana Puran Singh	Kuch Kuch Hota Hai	
2000	Anupam Kher	Haseena Maan Jayegi	
2001	Paresh Rawal	Hera Pheri	
2002	–	–	
2003	–	–	
2004	Paresh Rawal	Awara Paagal Deewana	
2005	Riteish Deshmukh	Masti	
2006	Abhishek Bachchan	Bunty Aur Babli	
2007	Shreyas Talpade	Dor	
2008	Irfan Khan	Life in a... Metro	
2009	Tusshar Kapoor	Golmaal Returns	
2010	Omi Vaidya	3 Idiots	
2011	Sanjay Mishra	Phas Gaye Re Obama	
2012	Pitobash	Shor in the City	
2013	Abhishek Bachchan; Annu Kapoor	Bol Bachchan; Vicky Donor	
2014	Richa Chadda	Fukrey	
2015	Sharib Hashmi	Filmistaan	
2017	Varun Dhawan	Dishoom	
2018	Varun Dhawan	Badrinath Ki Dulhania	
2019	–	–	
2020	Yami Gautam	Bala	

== See also ==
- Screen Awards
- Bollywood
- Cinema of India
