= The Hangman (2005 film) =

2005 Bollywood drama film by Vishal Bhandari

- Theatrical poster
- Directed by: Vishal Bhandari
- Written by: Marcus Paul; Amol Gupte
- Produced by: Bipin Patel
- Starring: Shreyas Talpade; Om Puri
- Cinematography: V. Manikandan
- Edited by: Deepa Bhatia
- Music by: Vishal–Shekhar
- Distributed by: B4U Productions
- Release dates: 26 November 2005 (International Film Festival of India); 5 February 2010
- Running time: 162 minutes
- Language: Hindi

The Hangman is a Bollywood drama film produced by Bipin Patel and directed by Vishal Bhandari. The film stars Om Puri, Shreyas Talpade and Gulshan Grover in the lead roles. It was set to be released in English first, in 2005 but it failed. Then it was rescheduled to be released in 2007. This time again, the release met with a failure. Finally, it was released worldwide on 5 February 2010. A dubbed version in English was also released.

== Plot ==
The Hangman, starring internationally acclaimed actor Om Puri (East is East, Jewel in the Crown, City of Joy and Gandhi), is a story about one man's quest to attain redemption. Puri, who gives a compelling performance as the aged and tired executioner Shiva, has been forced into his forefathers' profession.

Shiva's overwhelming desire is to create a better life for his son Ganesh (Shreyas Talpade). Shiva seeks help from his friend, the prison jailor (Gulshan Grover). Ganesh is taken to the city under the jailor's guardianship where he pursues his father's ultimate dream of becoming a police officer. But a series of ill-fated events result in a startling tragedy.

Based in a culture full of ancient customs and traditions, this bittersweet tale follows Shiva as he struggles between the mandates of his profession and his desire to achieve salvation and happiness.

== Cast ==
- Om Puri as Shiva Sathe
- Gulshan Grover as Jail Superintendent Virendra
- Shreyas Talpade as Ganesh Sathe
- Smita Jaykar as Parvati Sathe
- Tom Alter as Father Mathew
- Anita Kanwar as Madam at the brothel
- Yatin Karyekar as Billa
- Nazneen Ghani as Gauri
- Amrita Bedi as Amrita
