= Golmaal 3 =

2010 Indian film by Rohit Shetty

- Theatrical release poster
- Directed by: Rohit Shetty
- Written by: Screenplay: Yunus Sajawal; Dialogues: Farhad-Sajid
- Produced by: Dhilin Mehta
- Starring: Mithun Chakraborty; Ratna Pathak Shah; Ajay Devgn; Arshad Warsi; Kareena Kapoor; Tusshar Kapoor; Shreyas Talpade; Kunal Khemu
- Cinematography: Dudley
- Edited by: Steven H. Bernard
- Music by: Songs: Pritam; Guest Composition: Amar Mohile; Score: Sanjoy Chowdhury
- Production companies: Shree Ashtavinayak Cine Vision; Eros International; Shree Ashtavinayak Light Camera Action
- Release date: 4 November 2010
- Running time: 140 minutes
- Country: India
- Language: Hindi
- Budget: ₹40 crore
- Box office: est. ₹167 crore

Golmaal 3 (transl. Chaos 3) is a 2010 Indian Hindi-language action comedy film directed by Rohit Shetty and the third film in the Golmaal series. The film contains an ensemble cast starring Mithun Chakraborty, Ratna Pathak Shah, Ajay Devgn, Arshad Warsi, Kareena Kapoor, Tusshar Kapoor, Shreyas Talpade, Kunal Khemu and Johnny Lever. The storyline is partially inspired by Basu Chatterjee's 1978 film Khatta Meetha which itself was based on the 1968 film Yours, Mine and Ours.

Golmaal 3 was released on 4 November 2010, coinciding with Diwali. The film received mixed reviews, with praise for its humour and performances but criticism for its repetitive jokes and narrative. Nevertheless, the film became blockbuster at the box office and was the fourth film to enter the 100 Crore Club in India, eventually nearing a final worldwide total of ₹167 crore (US$17 million). The film was ranked as the second highest-grossing film of 2010 in India after Dabangg and third worldwide behind Dabangg and My Name Is Khan.

Golmaal 3 was later remade in Telugu as Pandavulu Pandavulu Tummeda (2014). A fourth film in the series, Golmaal Again was released in 2017.

== Plot ==
Pritam, also known as Pappu, is an elderly bus driver. His three good-for-nothing sons, Madhav, the group leader; Laxman, the poetic idiot; and Lucky, the innocent mute, are always up to trouble, mostly by scamming people. On the other hand, Geeta, nicknamed Guddi, is an elderly woman whose two sons, Laxman, the stammerer, and Gopal, the strong but kind leader, own a water sports stall at the beach, funded by a don named Vasooli Bhai. Daboo is Gopal's and Laxman's business partner; Geeta occasionally suspects that Daboo and Gopal may have a thing for each other.

Madhav, Laxman, and Lucky's don, Pappi, and his goons, Dagga and Teja, rob the queen's necklace and are on the run from the police; they end up in Goa. Pappi, who suffers from short-term memory, hides the necklace in Pritam's house. Soon enough, both groups meet at a bar, and Pritam's sons open a water sports shack opposite Geeta's sons' stall, and a rivalry begins. Filled with mayhem, both groups try to take down each other's businesses but fail hilariously. In response to his sons' pleas, Pritam goes to settle it out with their rivals, but is instead greeted by Geeta, who, it turns out, is his college sweetheart, who start arguing with each other, which is overheard by Daboo, who doubts if they had a thing for each other.

After day-by-day stalking, Pritam is caught by Geeta at a church, and they discuss their pasts. It is revealed that the group of Gopal and Madhav are orphans. Madhav, Laxman, and Lucky were adopted by Pritam, who started working at an orphanage, while Gopal and Laxman were the grandsons of Geeta's father's servant, Shambhu. Daboo overhears their love story as well as their past and decides to get the two married, with their sons' permission. Daboo lies to both sides of siblings that Pritam and Geeta have their younger stepbrothers to get them married. At the court, Gopal and Laxman find out that their rivals are actually their siblings and start fighting with each other. Although they later confront Daboo for this mess, who reveals to them that she told a lie only to unite them and their parents. After this, Madhav and his siblings go to their home, only to find that Pritam has given the keys to the owner.

After Pritam and his sons get out of the home, the two families start living in one house, filled with non-stop laughter and mayhem, with both groups trying and failing to evict the other, due to which Pritam gets injured in 2 of the attempts. During Daboo's birthday celebration at a mall, one of the debtors of Pritam's sons, named Raghu, attacks the group, and Geeta is injured. Gopal, who refused to accompany the group earlier, shows up, and the five sons fight off Raghu and his goons. Later that day, the five boys blamed each other for not solving their own problems and for how it hurt their father and mother, respectively. An argument takes place between Pritam, Geeta, and Daboo. The argument is overheard by Lucky, who also finds out that they are not Pritam and Geeta's sons, when Daboo threatens Pritam and Geeta that she will confess it to them. After Lucky informs the others, and Daboo, who is also an orphan, follows him and confesses it herself, the boys vow not to tell the couple that they know they are orphans, and to hide that, they vow to become brothers in the real sense, bonding strongly in the process.

They also open a large toy store with the help of Vasooli Bhai and Pappi. Upon meeting Pritam during the store's opening, Pappi remembers where he hid the necklace and attempts to turn himself in, but this causes everyone to believe that Pritam was the one who stole the necklace, causing a long squabble and chase. Pritam finds the necklace after the mayhem, and Pappi and his goons are arrested after Gopal and Daboo trick him into summoning the police and making him reveal the location of the hidden necklace and that he was the one who stole it.

Later, Pritam and Geeta go on their honeymoon, and Vasooli and Chintu decide to go on a date. Meanwhile, Gopal, Madhav, Lucky, and the two Laxmans end up brawling after an argument over their rooms. During the argument, Daboo tries to stop them, but they don't. The film ends with Daboo breaking the fourth wall by saying “I can't stop them, only one man can” on the camera and pulls the director of the film, Rohit Shetty, and other crew members to stop their argument. The whole cast and crew enter the frame to stop them together, which itself creates chaos.

== Cast ==
- Mithun Chakraborty as Pritam "Pappu"
- Ratna Pathak Shah as Geeta Chopra "Guddi"
- Ajay Devgan as Gopal Chopra "Gopu"
- Arshad Warsi as Madhav
- Kareena Kapoor as Divya "Daboo"
- Tusshar Kapoor as Lucky
- Shreyas Talpade as Laxman Chopra (Gopal and Daboo’s team)
- Kunal Khemu as Laxman 2 (Madhav and Lucky’s team)
- Murali Sharma as Inspector Dande
- Johnny Lever as Pappi Bhai
- Mukesh Tiwari as Vasooli Bhai
- Ashwini Kalsekar as Chintu
- Sanjay Mishra as Dagga Singh
- Vrajesh Hirjee as Teja
- Vijay Patkar as Havaldar Gandhari
- Jeetu Verma as Raghubir
- Rohit Shetty as himself
- Prem Chopra as Prem Chopra, Geeta's father.
- Viju Khote as Shambhu Kaka
- Harry Josh as Raghav

== Soundtrack ==
Golmaal 3

Soundtrack album by Pritam, Amar Mohile
- Released: October 8, 2010
- Genre: Feature film soundtrack
- Length: 31:29
- Label: T-Series
- Producer: Pritam

Pritam, Amar Mohile chronology
Aakrosh (2010)	Golmaal 3 (2010)	Dil Toh Baccha Hai Ji (2011)

The soundtrack was composed by Pritam (Ale, Apna Har Din, Apna Har Din Remix) and Amar Mohile (Disco Dancer and Yaad aa Raha Hai). The rest of the songs were composed by Pritam and Amar together, while the lyrics were written by Kumaar.

Track list
No.	Title	Singer(s)	Length
1.	"Golmaal"	K.K., Anushka Manchanda, Monali Thakur	4:02
2.	"Apna Har Din"	Shaan, Anushka Manchanda	4:20
3.	"Ale"	Neeraj Shridhar, Antara Mitra	4:40
4.	"Desi Kali"	Neeraj Shridhar, Sunidhi Chauhan	4:19
5.	"Golmaal" (Remix by DJ Suketu featuring PaVaN)	K.K., Anushka Manchanda, Monali Thakur	4:23
6.	"Apna Har Din" (Remix by DJ A-Myth)	Shaan, Anushka Manchanda	3:55
7.	"Desi Kali" (Remix by DJ Chetas & DJ NYK)	Neeraj Shridhar, Sunidhi Chauhan	3:58
8.	"Disco Dancer"	Bappi Lahiri	1:52
9.	"Yaad Aa Raha Hain"	Sudesh Bhosale	4:27
Total length:			31:16

== Reception ==
=== Critical reception ===
On the review aggregator website Rotten Tomatoes, 44% of 9 critics' reviews are positive, with an average rating of 5.5/10. On the review-aggregation website Mirchiplex.com, the film was scored 2/5 based on 12 reviews.

Mayank Shekhar of Hindustan Times rated it 1.5/5 and noted that "the filmmakers have six main actors to juggle with, and as many side comedians to lend parts to. Never mind the narrative, they would be happy with as any corny antics and dialogues with whoever was available." Raja Sen of Rediff.com gave a similar rating explaining that "[he] was not looking for sensitivity or smarts in Golmaal 3 [but for]... a few good jokes. [However], the film does not oblige." On the other hand, critic Taran Adarsh of Bollywood Hungama rated it 4/5, concluding that "Golmaal 3 is an ideal fun ride with thrice the enjoyment and gratification, thrice the magic and thrice the hilarity." The Times of India explained that "[although] the comic acts get repetitive...there is a laugh riot waiting for you at the multiplex this weekend." Vinayak Chakravorty of Mail Today gave it 3 stars out of 5.

=== Indian Stammering Association criticism ===
The Indian Stammering Association (TISA), based in Dehradun, started an online petition to the censor board against the comical depiction of stuttering, a disabling disorder that affects millions of children and many adults.

In October 2010 TISA filed a public interest writ petition against the director and producers of the film Golmaal 3 and the censor board of India at Uttarakhand High Court. It objected to the film's portrayal of stammerers as objects of ridicule, on the grounds that this promoted discrimination and the teasing and bullying of people who stammer. The film-makers and Censor Board were to respond to the court notice by 14 December 2010. After that, the court was to hear this case.

=== Box office ===
Golmaal 3 released in India and internationally on 4 November 2010 to coincide with the Diwali weekend, usually considered a profitable time of the year. The film's opening collections on the first day reached ₹ 83 million and opening weekend net collections stood at ₹ 335 million. Opening week gross collections were around ₹ 622.5 million in India and ₹ 100 million overseas.

The film had a strong second weekend in theatres, grossing ₹ 190 million. During its second and third week at the Indian box office, the film grossed ₹ 317.5 million and ₹ 90 million respectively, therefore increasing the film's total to ₹ 1075.6 million. Meanwhile, the film earned $1,132,192 in United States and Canada, £638,496 in UK and $352,063 in Australia. Golmaal 3 became the second highest-grossing Hindi film of 2010.

== Awards and nominations ==
Date of ceremony	Award	Category	Recipient(s) and nominee(s)	Result	Ref.
6 January 2011	Screen Awards	Best Performer of The Year	Ajay Devgn	Won	
6 January 2011	Screen Awards	Best Comedian	Tusshar Kapoor	Nominated	
11 January 2011	Producers Guild Film Awards	Best Actress in a Leading Role	Kareena Kapoor	Nominated	
11 January 2011	Producers Guild Film Awards	Best Actress in a Supporting Role	Ratna Pathak	Nominated	
14 January 2011	Zee Cine Awards	Best Film	Golmaal 3	Nominated	
14 January 2011	Zee Cine Awards	Best Actor – Female	Kareena Kapoor	Nominated	
14 January 2011	Zee Cine Awards	Best Actor in a Supporting Role – Male	Mithun Chakraborty	Nominated	
14 January 2011	Zee Cine Awards	Best Actor in a Supporting Role – Female	Ratna Pathak	Nominated	
14 January 2011	Zee Cine Awards	Best Actor in a Comic Role	Johnny Lever	Nominated	
14 January 2011	Zee Cine Awards	Best Actor in a Comic Role	Tusshar Kapoor	Nominated	
14 January 2011	Zee Cine Awards	Best Actor in a Comic Role	Kunal Khemu	Won	
14 January 2011	Zee Cine Awards	Best Music Director	Pritam	Nominated	
29 January 2011	Filmfare Awards	Best Actress	Kareena Kapoor	Nominated	
29 January 2011	Filmfare Awards	Best Supporting Actress	Ratna Pathak	Nominated	
29 January 2011	Filmfare Awards	Best Scene of the Year	Golmaal 3 (Conflict between the brothers when parents watching TV)	Won	
25 June 2011	International Indian Film Academy Awards	Best Actress	Kareena Kapoor	Nominated	
25 June 2011	International Indian Film Academy Awards	Best Supporting Actor	Mithun Chakraborty	Nominated	
25 June 2011	International Indian Film Academy Awards	Best Supporting Actress	Ratna Pathak	Nominated	
25 June 2011	International Indian Film Academy Awards	Best Performance in a Comic Role	Johnny Lever	Nominated	

== Sequel ==
The fourth installment in the series, Golmaal Again, was released on 20 October 2017. The sequel stars Ajay Devgan, Arshad Warsi, Tushar Kapoor, Shreyas Talpade and Kunal Khemu reprising their roles while Parineeti Chopra and Tabu play the female leads. Rohit Shetty announced on 14 July 2016 that Golmaal Again was releasing on 20 October 2017.
