= Nazneen Ghaani =

Indian actress

- Born: 3 January 1986 (age 39); Mumbai, India
- Occupation: Actress
- Years active: 2005–2014

Nazneen Ghaani is an Indian actress probably best known for playing the role of Ragini Juneja in Disney Channel India's sitcom, Kya Mast Hai Life. Nazneen acted as Gauri in The Hangman.

Ghaani appeared in many advertisements like Big Bazar Badal Dalo, Cadbury Dairy Milk, Star Plus on Mobile etc. She has done over 150 advertisements.

== Filmography ==
- Maine Gandhi Ko Nahin Mara (2005)
- The Hangman (2005)

== Television ==
- Kya Mast Hai Life (2009) as Ragini juneja
