= Golmaal Again =

2017 Indian film by Rohit Shetty

Golmaal Again!!!
- Theatrical release poster
- Directed by: Rohit Shetty
- Written by: Screenplay: Yunus Sajawal; Dialogues: Farhad-Sajid
- Story by: Rohit Shetty
- Produced by: Sangeeta Sachin Ahir; Rohit Shetty; Shivashish Sarkar
- Starring: Ajay Devgn; Tabu; Parineeti Chopra; Arshad Warsi; Tusshar Kapoor; Shreyas Talpade; Kunal Khemu; Neil Nitin Mukesh; Johnny Lever
- Cinematography: Jomon T. John
- Edited by: Bunty Nagi
- Music by: Score: Amar Mohile; Songs: Thaman S Amaal Mallik; Lijo George – DJ Chetas; Abhishek Arora
- Production companies: Reliance Entertainment; Mangl Murti Films; Rohit Shetty Picturez
- Distributed by: Reliance Entertainment
- Release date: 20 October 2017
- Running time: 152 minutes
- Country: India
- Language: Hindi
- Budget: ₹142 crore
- Box office: ₹310.98 crore

Golmaal Again (transl. Chaos Again) is a 2017 Indian Hindi-language supernatural action comedy film written and directed by Rohit Shetty; produced by Rohit Shetty Pictures, Mangl Murti Films and Reliance Entertainment. The film is the fourth installment of Golmaal franchise and stars Ajay Devgn, Tabu, Arshad Warsi, Parineeti Chopra, Tusshar Kapoor, Shreyas Talpade, Kunal Khemu, Neil Nitin Mukesh and Johnny Lever.

The film was released in Diwali 2017. Despite clashing with Aamir Khan's Secret Superstar, Golmaal Again became one of the year's highest grossers, was a blockbuster at the box office and became the 46th highest grossing Indian film of all time. Its lifetime domestic net collection was more than ₹244 crores, while the worldwide gross ended at ₹310.98 crores. The film received mixed reviews from critics with praise for its humour and performances and criticism for its flaws in the technical aspects. A spin-off titled Cirkus was released on 23 December 2022.

== Plot ==
Gopal, Madhav, Laxman 1, Laxman 2, and Lucky live in an orphanage in Ooty managed by businessman Joy Jamnadas. Gopal is afraid of ghosts, Lucky is mute, and Laxman 1 has a lisp. Gopal and Laxman 1 are a duo, and the rest are a trio. Both have a mutual dislike for each other. They are also aware of the local librarian Anna's ability to see spirits. The boys find a baby outside the orphanage one night and take her in, naming her Khushi. One day, when Madhav pranks and scares Gopal in an empty bungalow belonging to Jamnadas' friend, Colonel Chauhan, the boys fight. Gopal gets punished, which prompts Gopal and Laxman 1 to leave the orphanage, and soon, Madhav, Lucky and Laxman 2 also do the same. Khushi is later adopted.

25 years later, the five work as plot seizers; Gopal and Laxman 1 work for Babli Bhai, and Madhav, Lucky and Laxman 2 work for Vasooli Bhai. The group reunites after learning about Jamnadas' death. Returning to the orphanage for Jamnadas' memorial, they meet Colonel Chauhan, now blind, and reunite with Anna and Pappi, a former orphan and caretaker of the orphanage, who has memory loss. They meet Damini, the bungalow's caretaker and learn about Chauhan's daughter's demise. During the memorial, businessman Vasu Reddy reveals the orphanage will be demolished and replaced with his own building. Anna and Chauhan decide to rent out two rooms, upsetting Vasu. After the group leaves the orphanage and returns home, a ghost possesses Laxman 1 and speaks in Nana Patekar's voice, rambling that Jamnadas's death was a murder, scaring Gopal. Afterwards, Gopal and Laxman 1 call Anna, who lies that the ghost is still in their house and suggests they move to Chauhan's house. Later, the ghost possesses Madhav and prompts Vasooli to assign him, Laxman 2, and Lucky to evict Gopal and Laxman from Chauhan's bungalow for Vasu, indirectly bringing the three back to Ooty.

Upon reaching Ooty, the two groups learn that Chauhan's daughter also died the same night, but they continue their rivalry. Madhav, Lucky, and Laxman 2 try to scare Gopal into leaving the house, but Gopal gets possessed by the same ghost and beats up Lucky and Laxman 2. Later, Vasu assigns Madhav, Lucky and Laxman 2 to burn down the house, but Lucky also gets possessed and starts talking in Nana Patekar's voice, scaring the group. The two groups decide to leave, but Anna and Damini convince them to stay for the birthday celebration, and the group reconciles. While Damini and Gopal talk outside, Pappi arrives and shows the photographs he took from the celebration. But Damini cannot be seen in the photographs, and Pappi says that he cannot see anyone sitting beside Gopal. They realise that Damini is Pappi's girlfriend and the housemaid working for Chauhan, and Chauhan's daughter is the ghost sitting beside Gopal. The boys try to run along with Pappi, Babli Bhai and Vasooli Bhai, while Gopal escapes and stands in front of the house. Anna stops them and explains that the ghost is Khushi.

A flashback narrated by Khushi explains that she was adopted by Chauhan and his wife. Her boyfriend, Nikhil Surana, Jamnadas' nephew, who is working with Vasu, had plans to obtain and demolish the orphanage to build an amusement park. When Jamnadas found out, he disagreed and threatened to change his will and give his money to Pappi instead. The two fought, causing Nikhil to kill him in rage. Upon confronting him and threatening to tell the police, Khushi was strangled to death by Nikhil. With the help of Vasu, he managed to stage their deaths as accidents. However, Khushi's spirit came to Anna for help, who was surprised that the boys could see Khushi and eventually brought them to the house to help get justice and save the orphanage.

Back to the present, Gopal fights Vasu's thugs while the rest of the boys, who wanted to stay away from the matter, are convinced to stay. They convince Gopal to stop chasing the thugs and almost manage to scare Vasu into a confession, but Nikhil arrives before they can and reveals that there is no evidence to prove him guilty. This leads to a fight, during which Khushi attacks and nearly kills Nikhil but is calmed down by Anna, and Vasu convinces Nikhil to confess. With the orphanage saved, Khushi's spirit bids goodbye to the boys and Anna and departs to heaven.

== Cast ==
- Ajay Devgn as Gopal "Gopu"
- Tusshar Kapoor as Lucky
  - Mohammed Saud Mansuri as Young Lucky
- Arshad Warsi as Madhav
- Shreyas Talpade as Laxman 1
- Kunal Khemu as Laxman 2
- Tabu as Anna Mathew Librarian
  - Diksha Sharma as young Anna
- Parineeti Chopra as Khushi Chauhan, who is mistaken for Damini
- Neil Nitin Mukesh as Nikhil
- Johny Lever as Pappi
- Sanjay Mishra as Babli
- Mukesh Tiwari as Vasooli
- Prakash Raj as Vasu Reddy
- Vrajesh Hirjee as Panduranga
- Murali Sharma as Inspector Dande
- Vijay Patkar as Havaldar Gandhari
- Uday Tikekar as Jamnadas
- Sachin Khedekar as Colonel Chouhan
- Ashwini Kalsekar as Damini
- Mamta Verma as Mrs. Chouhan, Colonel's wife
- Mohan Ram as Ram Krishna Iyer, ghost (Note: He is erroneously listed in the end credits as playing Harish Iyer.)
- Shriswara as Prerna Iyer
- Nana Patekar as voice of ghost, himself

== Production ==
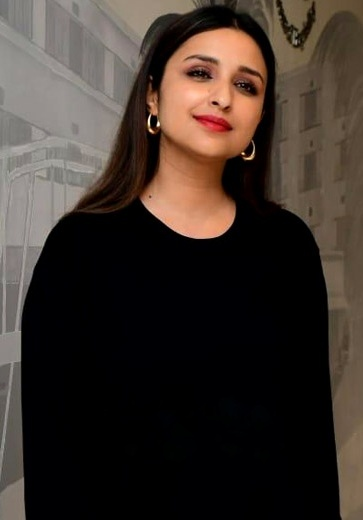
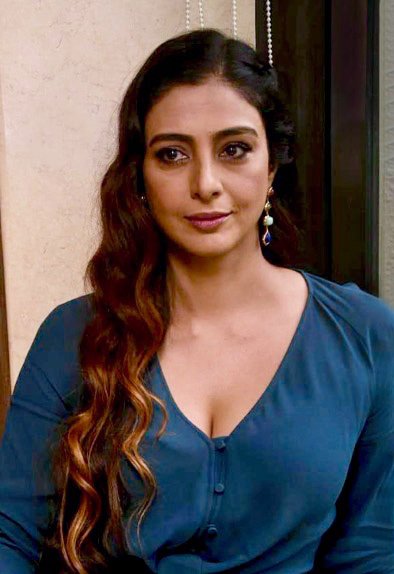
The film marked Chopra and Tabu's first project with Shetty

In July 2016, Rohit Shetty and Ajay Devgn announced the fourth installment of Golmaal series. Shetty again wanted to cast Kareena Kapoor who played the heroine in Golmaal 2 & Golmaal 3. However, she stepped out owing to her pregnancy and Parineeti Chopra was signed. After Tabu's entry in the film, Neil Nitin Mukesh was confirmed as the antagonist. Prakash Raj joined the film in February 2017.

Principal photography for the film commenced at Mumbai in March 2017. First schedule ended in April 2017. In June 2017, a major portion of the film was shot in Ooty. The filming wrapped up in July 2017, and post-production work was finished in the last week of August 2017.

== Soundtrack ==
Golmaal Again

Soundtrack album by Amaal Mallik, Thaman S, Lijo George-DJ Chetas and Abhishek Arora
- Released: 6 October 2017
- Genre: Feature film soundtrack
- Length: 18:55
- Language: Hindi
- Label: T-Series

Amaal Mallik chronology
Mubarakan (2017)	Golmaal Again (2017)	Badrinath Ki Dulhania (2017)

Thaman S chronology
Jawaan (2017)	Golmaal Again (2017)	Sketch (2018)

Lijo George-DJ Chetas chronology
Baadshaho (2017)	Golmaal Again (2017)	Mitron (2018)

Singles from Golmaal Again
- 1. "Golmaal Title Track" Released: 23 September 2017; 2. "Maine Tujhko Dekha" Released: 29 September 2017

The music of the film have been composed by Amaal Mallik, Thaman S, Lijo George-DJ Chetas and Abhishek Arora while the lyrics of the film have been penned by Kumaar. The first track of the film titled as "Golmaal (Title Track)" sung by Brijesh Shandilya and Aditi Singh Sharma was released on 23 September 2017. The second track of the film "Neend Churai Meri" from the 1997 film Ishq has been recreated to "Maine Tujhko Dekha" for this film in the voices of Neeraj Shridhar and Sukriti Kakar and was released on 29 September 2017. The soundtrack was released on 6 October 2017 by T-Series.

The track "Maine Pyar Kiya" from the 1989 film Maine Pyar Kiya has been recreated to "Aate Jaate Hanste Gaate" for this film in the voices of Nikhil D'Souza and Anushka Manchanda and was released on 23 October 2017 by Saregama.

All lyrics are written by Kumaar.

Track listing
No.	Title	Music	Singer(s)	Length
1.	"Golmaal" (Title Track)	Thaman S	Brijesh Shandilya, Aditi Singh Sharma	4:24
2.	"Maine Tujhko Dekha"	Amaal Mallik	Neeraj Shridhar, Sukriti Kakar	3:27
3.	"Itna Sannata Kyun Hai"	Lijo George – DJ Chetas	Amit Mishra, Aditi Singh Sharma	3:12
4.	"Hum Nahi Sudhrenge"	Amaal Mallik	Armaan Malik	5:03
5.	"Aate Jaate Hanste Gaate" (Lyrics by: Dev Kohli)	Abhishek Arora	Nikhil D'Souza, Anushka Manchanda	2:49
Total length:				18:55

== Reception ==
=== Release ===
20 October 2017 was announced as release date of the film, coinciding with Diwali.

=== Critical response ===
On the review aggregator website Rotten Tomatoes, 50% of 8 critics' reviews are positive, with an average rating of 4.7/10.

Meena Iyer of The Times of India gave the film 3.5 stars and stated that the film is full of laughs with no substance. Raja Sen of NDTV gave the film 2 stars, stating that Golmaal Again is "a marginally better film than Golmaal 3 and Golmaal Returns" but felt the film was too long. Rajeev Masand of News 18 gave the film 2 out of 5 stars and said, "Mercifully no cars are spun around like tops and exploded this time around, but the characters repeatedly bandy about the film's message like a disclaimer, as if warning you not to expect any more than they promise to deliver: “No logic, only magic.” Logic indeed is in short supply here, and frankly, the real magic the filmmakers conjure up is the ability to keep this franchise on the road for all these years with such minimal creative investment."

=== Box office ===
On its opening day, Golmaal Again grossed ₹30.10 crore net, one of the highest openings for a Bollywood film in 2017. The film collected ₹28.25 on the second day. The third day's collection was ₹28.5 crore. On the fourth day, the film collected ₹15.25 crore, taking the total collections to ₹102.85 crore. On the fifth day, the film collected ₹13.25 crore. The sixth day's collection of the film was ₹10.5 crore.

By the end of the first week, the film grossed ₹135 crore. The third week's gross was ₹1974 million. Golmaal Again grossed ₹200 crore after four weeks of its release in Indian box office. The film grossed US$3 million in its first weekend in overseas. The film grossed $160,000 in Nepal, and $400,000 in Pakistan in the first weekend. The worldwide collection of the film was ₹3 billion in its fourth week. Also it is the highest-grossing Indian film in Fiji. The film became the highest-grossing Bollywood film of 2017 Until Tiger Zinda Hai broke its record in 2017. Golmaal Again ran in cinemas for more than 50 days in India.

== See also ==
- List of Hindi comedy films
- List of Hindi horror films
