= Kunal Khemu =

Indian actor, singer, and filmmaker (born 1983)

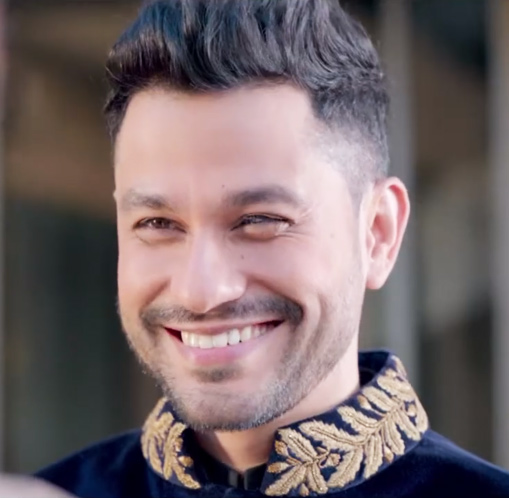
- Khemu in 2019
- Born: 25 May 1983 (age 43); Srinagar, Jammu & Kashmir, India
- Education: Narsee Monjee College
- Occupation: Actor
- Years active: 1987–present
- Spouse: Soha Ali Khan (m. 2015)
- Children: 1
- Relatives: Moti Lal Kemmu (grandfather)
- Family: Pataudi family (by marriage); Tagore family (by marriage)

Kunal Khemu (born 25 May 1983) is an Indian actor, director, writer and singer who works predominantly in Hindi films. Khemu is a recipient of several accolades including one Filmfare Award and one IIFA Award.

Khemu made his acting debut as a child artist and received praises as a child actor in films such as Hum Hain Rahi Pyar Ke (1993), Raja Hindustani (1996), Zakhm (1998) and Dushman (1998). He made his lead debut with the sleeper hit Kalyug (2005). Khemu then received recognition and box office success with Golmaal 3 (2010), Blood Money (2012), Go Goa Gone (2013), Golmaal Again (2017) and Malang (2017). This was followed by streaming projects such as Abhay (2019-2022) and Single Papa (2025).

Khemu made his directorial debut with Madgaon Express (2024), earning the Filmfare Award for Best Debut Director. He is married to actress Soha Ali Khan, with whom he has a daughter.

== Early life and background ==
Khemu was born on 25 May 1983 in Srinagar, in the Kashmir Valley of the erstwhile Indian state of Jammu and Kashmir, into a Kashmiri Pandit family to actors Ravi Kemmu and Jyoti Kemmu. His father has worked with Shyam Benegal in Bharat Ek Khoj as unit director. He is the older child to the couple and has a younger sister named Karishma Khemu.

Khemu's family lived in Srinagar during his early years and he got initial education from Burn Hall School, but his family had to flee to Jammu during their religious exodus after an insurgency erupted in Kashmir during the 1990s. Later, his family stayed in the suburban Mira Road neighbourhood of Mumbai. He finished his schooling from N. L. Dalmia High School in Mira Road and later attended Narsee Monjee College of Commerce and Economics in Vile Parle for his further studies. He now lives in Khar.

His paternal grandfather, Moti Lal Kemmu was a Kashmiri playwright, and a recipient of the Sahitya Akademi award in 1982 for his contribution to Kashmiri literature, and the Padma Shri.

== Career ==
=== Child artist and early work in lead role (1987–2009) ===
Khemu made his debut as a child actor appearing in the Doordarshan TV series Gul Gulshan Gulfaam (1987). He made his film debut with Mahesh Bhatt's film Sir (1993). He went on to star as a child artist in films including Raja Hindustani, Zakhm, Bhai, Hum Hain Rahi Pyar Ke, and Dushman. His performance in Zakhm earned him the Screen Award for Best Child Artist.

Khemu made his lead debut in 2005 with Kalyug. He played a young man who sets out to exact revenge upon the porn industry after his wife commits suicide, opposite Smilie Suri. It emerged as a sleeper hit. Taran Adarsh noted, "Kunal makes his big screen debut and delivers a knockout performance from start to end. The boy exudes the intensity that very few newcomers can boast of."

Khemu had two releases in 2007; he first appeared in Traffic Signal. He then played one of the leads in Dhol, which emerged as a commercial success. Syed Firdaus Ashraf of Rediff.com was appreciative of his performance but felt Rajpal Yadav overshadowed the other three leads. This success was followed by a series of films that primarily underperformed commercially including Superstar (2008), Dhoondte Reh Jaaoge (2009) opposite Soha Ali Khan, Jai Veeru (2009) and 99 (2009). Among these only Jai Veeru became a moderate success.

=== Commercial success and career progression (2010–2019) ===
Khemu had his career breakthrough with Golmaal 3, which released in 2010, where he played Laxman, the poetic idiot. Mayank Shekhar of Hindustan Times found him to be in "top form". Golmaal 3 became a major commercial success and the third highest-grossing Hindi film of the year. His next release, Blood Money (2012), opposite Amrita Puri emerged as a moderate success and received positive reviews from critics. He played an honest man who unknowingly became part of the diamond trade.

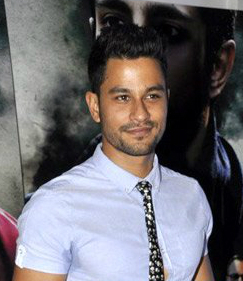
Khemu at an event for Go Goa Gone

In 2013, Khemu played an unemployed man in Go Goa Gone, where he also wrote the dialogues. The film is regarded as India’s first zombie comedy film and has also been described as first stoner comedy. It emerged as a commercial success at the box office. Lisa Tsering of The Hollywood Reporter felt Kunal "ace his role" and was appreciative of his comic timing. All of Khemu's next releases failed at the box office; Mr Joe B. Carvalho (2014), Bhaag Johnny (2015) and Guddu Ki Gun (2015). In 2017, he did a voice-over in an animated film Hanuman: Da' Damdaar as Lord Indra.

In 2017, Khemu reprised his role as Laxman, in Golmaal Again. A commercial success, the film became the highest grossing film of the franchise and one of the highest-grossing Indian films of all time. His next release, Kalank (2019), saw him play a Muslim man influenced by communal hatred. The film failed commercially. In the same year, Khemu expanded to streaming series with Abhay, where he played a police officer opposite Asha Negi. The series was renewed for second and third season in 2020 and 2022 respectively. Reviewing season 2, Ronak Kotecha stated, "Kunal’s understated and restrained act in the title role is a definite winner."

=== Critical recognition and streaming projects (2020–present) ===
Khemu started the following decade with the 2020 film Malang, where he played a police officer opposite Amruta Khanvilkar. Monika Rawal Kukreja of Hindustan Times noted, "Kunal not only impresses but also surprises. He slips into the skin of his character effortlessly and you love watching him onscreen. He is intense, good looking and menacing. The film became a commercial success and the fifth highest grossing film of the year. Later that year, he appeared in Lootcase. It was released on Disney+ Hotstar and received positive reviews. Khemu started 2023 with the series Pop Kaun?, opposite Nupur Sanon. Chirag Sehgal of News18 felt Kunal looks "natural" and does his role with utmost perfection. He then played a stingy person opposite Shweta Tripathi in Kanjoos Makhichoos. The film is based on the Gujarati play Sajan Re Jhooth Mat Bolo.

2024 saw Khemu made his directorial debut with the crime comedy Madgaon Express. The film became a commercial success and received positive response. It earned him the IIFA Award and Filmfare Award for Best Debut Director. In 2025, Khemu played a confused man-child learning fatherhood after an unexpected adoption, in the series Single Papa. Nandini Ramnath noted, "Apart from comic timing and an ability to rattle off scripted lines as though he is improvising them, Kemmu has a knack for overshadowing his actors without crowding them."

In 2026, Khemu turned host for the reality series The Alliance. In the same year, Khemu directed and acted in Vibe, his second directorial after Madgaon Express. Shachi Chaturvedi of News18 was appreciative of his performance and direction and noted, "Kunal is making the kind of cinema we did not know we needed." The film failed at the box office.

== Personal life ==
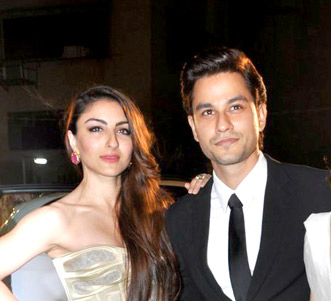
Khemu with his wife Soha Ali Khan in 2016

Khemu began a relationship with actress Soha Ali Khan in 2009. Khemu got engaged to Khan in July 2014 in Paris, and married her in Hindu wedding ceremony in Mumbai on 25 January 2015. Khan gave birth to their daughter, Inaaya Naumi Khemu on 29 September 2017.

== In the media ==
Khemu in 2012

Following his debut, Rediff.com placed him 8th in its "Bollywood's Next Big Thing" list. On Khemu's recognition through his comic roles, Mayur Sanap noted, "Kunal Kemmu has proved his versatility with some interesting parts across genres, but it is really comedy that the actor has won the most appreciation for." Times of India placed him at 11th position in their "50 Handsome Hunks" list. Khemu is a celebrity endorser for several brands such as Club Mahindra and Wellbeing Nutrition.

== Filmography ==
Key
†	Denotes films that have not yet been released

=== Films ===
Year	Title	Role	Notes	Ref.
1993	Sir	Kunal		
1993	Hum Hain Rahi Pyar Ke	Sunny		
1994	Naaraaz	Sunny		
1996	Raja Hindustani	Rajnikant		
1997	Tamanna	Young Sajid		
1997	Bhai	Kisna		
1998	Zakhm	Young Ajay		
1998	Dushman	Bheem Bahadur Singh		
1998	Angaaray	Young Amar		
2005	Kalyug	Kunal P. Dhar		
2007	Traffic Signal	Silsila		
2007	Dhol	Gautam "Goti" Sisodia		
2008	Superstar	Kunal Mehra / Karan Saxena		
2009	Dhoondte Reh Jaaoge	CA Anand Pawar		
2009	Jai Veeru	Veeru / Veer Sharma		
2009	99	Sachin		
2010	Golmaal 3	Laxman Sharma		
2012	Blood Money	Kunal Kadam		
2013	Go Goa Gone	Hardik	Also dialogue writer	
2014	Mr Joe B. Carvalho	Himself	Cameo	
2014	Haircut	Himself	Short film; cameo	
2015	Bhaag Johnny	Janardhan "Johnny" Arora		
2015	Guddu Ki Gun	Gowardhan "Guddu" Prasad		
2017	Hanuman: Da' Damdaar	Lord Indra	Voiceover	
2017	Poster Boys	Himself	Cameo	
2017	Golmaal Again	Laxman Sharma		
2018	Simmba	Himself	Cameo appearance	
2019	Kalank	Abdul Khan		
2020	Malang	Michael Rodriguez		
2020	Lootcase	Nandan Kumar		
2023	Kanjoos Makhichoos	Jamuna Prasad Pandey		
2024	Madgaon Express	Drug Peddler	Cameo appearance ; Also writer and director	
2026	Vibe	Hardik Sharma	Also writer and director	
TBA	Golmaal 5 †	Laxman Sharma	Filming	

=== Television ===
Year	Title	Role	Notes	Ref.
1987	Gul Gulshan Gulfaam	Unknown		
1989	Chitra Kathaien	Unknown	Episode: "Jhoot ka Aalam"	
2019–2022	Abhay	SP Abhay Pratap Singh	3 seasons	
2023	Pop Kaun?	Sahil Trivedi		
2025	Single Papa	Gaurav Gehlot		
2026	Alliance India	Host		
TBA	Gulkanda Tales †	TBA	Post-production	

== Discography ==
Year	Song	Film	Composer	Notes	Ref.
2013	"Babaji Ki Booti"	Go Goa Gone	Sachin–Jigar		
2024	"Hum Yahin"	Madgaon Express	Ankur Tewari; Kunal Khemu	Also lyricist for "Hum Yahin"and "Bohot Bhaari"	

== Awards and nominations ==
Year	Award	Category	Work	Result	Ref.
1998	Screen Awards	Best Child Artist	Zakhm	Won	
2006	Stardust Awards	Superstar of Tomorrow – Male	Kalyug	Won	
2014	Screen Awards	Best Dialogue	Go Goa Gone	Nominated	
2014	Screen Awards	Best Performance in a Comic Role – Male	Go Goa Gone	Nominated	
2023	Filmfare OTT Awards	Best Actor in a Series – Comedy	Pop Kaun?	Nominated	
2025	International Indian Film Academy Awards	Best Directorial Debut	Madgaon Express	Won	
2025	Zee Cine Awards	Best Debut Director	Madgaon Express	Won	
2025	70th Filmfare Awards	Best Debut Director	Madgaon Express	Won	
2025	70th Filmfare Awards	Best Screenplay	Madgaon Express	Nominated	
2025	70th Filmfare Awards	Best Dialogue	Madgaon Express	Nominated	
