= Shreyas Talpade =

Indian actor, director, and producer (born 1976)

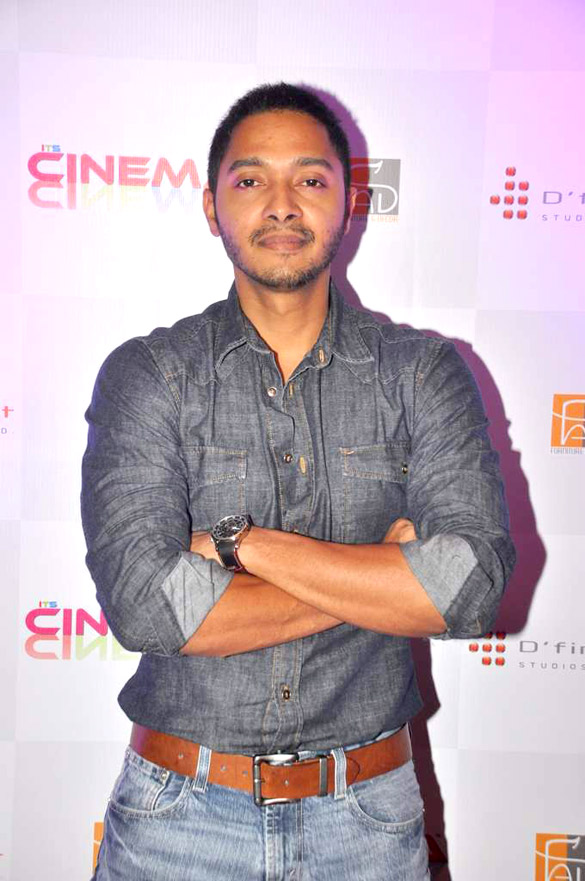
- Talpade in 2012
- Born: 27 January 1976 (age 50); Bombay, Maharashtra, India
- Education: Mithibai College
- Occupations: Actor; director; producer; voice over artist
- Spouse: Deepti Talpade (m. 2004)
- Children: 1
- Relatives: Jayshree Talpade (aunt)

Shreyas Talpade (born 27 January 1976) is an Indian actor, film director and producer who appears in Hindi and Marathi films. He has appeared in several critically and commercially successful films. He is better known for his role as Shah Rukh Khan's friend Pappu Master in Om Shanti Om (2007), the grand reincarnation melodrama of Farah Khan. He appeared in the comedies Golmaal Returns (2008), Welcome to Sajjanpur (2008), Golmaal 3 (2010), Housefull 2 (2012) and Golmaal Again (2017). Talpade also dubbed for Allu Arjun in the Hindi version of Pushpa: The Rise (2021) and its sequel Pushpa 2: The Rule (2024).

== Early life ==
Shreyas Talpade was born in Bombay, Maharashtra (Present-day Mumbai) on 27 January 1976. His father is the brother of actresses Meena T. and Jayshree T. (full name "Jayshri Talpade"). Shreyas attended Shree Ram Welfare Society’s High School in Andheri West followed by Mithibai College in Vile Parle.

== Career ==
Talpade began his acting career appearing in Marathi soap operas and doing stage shows across Maharashtra. He also appeared in the Zee TV soap opera Woh (1998) in which he was the main lead. He has also acted in mini serials for the production "Adhikari Brothers". His role, in a very popular Marathi serial Aabhal Maya, as the character Tejas was very popular among Marathi audiences. He also appeared in Jaane Anjaane (2001) aired on Doordarshan where he played the role of a son who dislikes his father because he felt that his father was the reason for his accident. Viewers liked the content of the same. Fame arrived after he made his Bollywood debut in Nagesh Kukunoor's Iqbal which was written by Vipul K Rawal in which he played the role of a deaf & mute youngster aspiring to be a cricketer. The film and his performance were well received by both audiences and critics. His next film was Kukunoor's Dor in which he played the comic role of a behroopiya, a man with many disguises. This film was also well received by critics.

In 2006, he starred in the comedy, Apna Sapna Money Money and in 2007, he starred in Farah Khan's blockbuster reincarnation drama, Om Shanti Om, with Shah Rukh Khan, where he played the role of Pappu Master, the best friend of Khan's character. In 2008, he was seen in Kukunoor's cross-cultural comedy film, Bombay To Bangkok. He also produced a Marathi film, Sanai Chaughade, which was released the same year. He also did movies like Shyam Benegal's Welcome to Sajjanpur, along with Golmaal Returns and Sangeeth Sivan's horror flick, Click. Shreyas was also seen in the horror film, Help. Shreyas next appeared in the movie Will You Marry Me? which released in 2012.

Shreyas has produced a Marathi film, titled Poshter Boyz, under his home production banner, Affluence Movies. The movie which released on 1 August 2014 was launched by Bollywood veteran Subhash Ghai. The film is directed by Sameer Patil and the music for it is composed by Lesle Lewis.

Poshter Boyz was remade in Hindi as Poster Boys and Shreyas made his directorial debut with this film which released on 8 September 2017. The film stars Shreyas himself along with Sunny Deol and Bobby Deol.

== Public image ==
In a series of sting operations carried out by Cobrapost code-named Operation Karaoke, Shreyas Talpade has been named as one of many celebrities who can be seen agreeing to promote the agenda of parties on social media platforms in exchange for money, on camera.

== Personal life ==
Shreyas Talpade is married to Deepti Talpade, a psychiatrist and is father to a daughter Aadya. In December 2023, he suffered a heart attack and underwent angioplasty.

== Filmography ==
Key
| † | Denotes films that have not yet been released |

=== Films ===
| Year | Title | Role | Language | Notes | Ref. |
|---|---|---|---|---|---|
| 2002 | Aankhen | Mushtaq | Hindi | Cameo appearance | |
| 2003 | Raghu More Bachelor Of Hearts | Raghu's friend | Hindi | | |
| 2003 | Resham Gath | Deven | Marathi | | |
| 2004 | Pachhadlela | Ravi | Marathi | | |
| 2004 | Savarkhed Ek Gaon | Ajay | Marathi | | |
| 2005 | Revati | Chandu | Hindi | | |
| 2005 | Iqbal | Iqbal Saeed Khan | Hindi | | |
| 2005 | Sarivar Sari | Vini's love interest | Marathi | | |
| 2006 | Apna Sapna Money Money | Arjun Fernandes | Hindi | | |
| 2006 | Dor | Bahuroopiya | Hindi | | |
| 2006 | Aai Shappath..! | Akash Mohan Ranade | Marathi | | |
| 2006 | Bayo | Vishwanath | Marathi | | |
| 2007 | Aggar | Dr. Aditya Merchant | Hindi | | |
| 2007 | Dil Dosti Etc | Sanjay Mishra | Hindi | | |
| 2007 | Om Shanti Om | Pappu Master | Hindi | | |
| 2008 | Bombay to Bangkok | Shankar Singh / Dr. Bhatawdekar (Note: Talpade played a single character with two or more names.) | Hindi | | |
| 2008 | Welcome to Sajjanpur | Mahadev Kushwaha | Hindi | | |
| 2008 | Golmaal Returns | Laxman Prasad Apte / Anthony Gonsalves | Hindi | | |
| 2008 | Dashavatar | Narad | Hindi | Voice only | |
| 2008 | Sanai Choughade | Aniket | Marathi | | |
| 2009 | Paying Guests | Bhavesh Verma / Karishma | Hindi | | |
| 2009 | Aage Se Right | SI Dinkar "Dinu" Waghmare | Hindi | | |
| 2010 | Click | Avinash "Avi" Mehra | Hindi | | |
| 2010 | The Hangman | Ganesh S. Sathe | Hindi | | |
| 2010 | Help | Dr. Aditya Motwani | Hindi | | |
| 2010 | Aashayein | Himself | Hindi | Special appearance in song "Ab Mujhko Jeena" | |
| 2010 | Golmaal 3 | Laxman Chopra | Hindi | | |
| 2010 | Mirch | Manjul | Hindi | | |
| 2011 | Teen Thay Bhai | Fancy Gill | Hindi | | |
| 2011 | Hum Tum Shabana | Karthik Iyer | Hindi | | |
| 2012 | Will You Marry Me? | Aarav Birla | Hindi | | |
| 2012 | Housefull 2 | Jai Babani | Hindi | | |
| 2012 | Joker | Babban | Hindi | | |
| 2012 | Kamaal Dhamaal Malamaal | Johnny Belinda | Hindi | | |
| 2014 | Entertainment | Johnny | Hindi | Cameo appearance | |
| 2014 | Poshter Boyz | Chief Minister | Marathi | Also producer | |
| 2015 | Baji | Baji / Chiddvilas "Chidu" / Akash | Marathi | | |
| 2016 | Great Grand Masti | Babu Rangeela | Hindi | Cameo appearance | |
| 2016 | Wah Taj | Tukaram Raosaheb Marathe | Hindi | | |
| 2017 | Poster Boys | Arjun Singh | Hindi | Also director and producer | |
| 2017 | Golmaal Again | Laxman | Hindi | | |
| 2018 | Bhaiaji Superhit | Tarun Porno Ghosh | Hindi | | |
| 2018 | Simmba | Himself | Hindi | Special appearance in song "Aankh Maarey" | |
| 2019 | Setters | Apurva Chaudhary | Hindi | | |
| 2021 | Speed Dial | Kabir | Hindi | Short film | |
| 2022 | Kaun Pravin Tambe? | Pravin Tambe | Hindi | | |
| 2022 | Aapdi Thaapdi | Sakharam Patil | Marathi | | |
| 2024 | Hi Anokhi Gaath | Shreeniwas | Marathi | | |
| 2024 | Luv You Shankar | Rudra | Hindi | | |
| 2024 | Kartam Bhugtam | Dev | Hindi | | |
| 2024 | Chandu Champion | Inspector Sachin Kamble | Hindi | | |
| 2025 | Emergency | Atal Bihari Vajpayee | Hindi | | |
| 2025 | Kapkapiii | Manu | Hindi | | |
| 2025 | Housefull 5 | Shiraz | Hindi | | |
| 2025 | Baaghi 4 | Jeetendra "Jeetu" Pratap Singh | Hindi | | |
| 2025 | Single Salma | Sikander Khan | Hindi | | |
| 2026 | Azad Bharath | Subhas Chandra Bose | Hindi | | |
| 2026 | Welcome to the Jungle | Nainsukh | Hindi | | |
| 2026 | The India Story | Yogesh Patil | Hindi | | |
| 2026 | Mardini | - | Hindi | Presenter | |
| 2026 | The Game Of Girgit † | TBA | Hindi | Filming | |
| TBA | Golmaal 5 † | TBA | Hindi | Filming | |

=== Television ===
| Year | Title | Role | Language | Notes | Ref. |
|---|---|---|---|---|---|
| 1995 | Julalya Surel Tara | | Marathi | | |
| 1997–1998 | Damini | Tejas | Hindi | | |
| 1998 | Woh | Ashutosh Dhar | Hindi | | |
| 1999–2000 | Amanat | Dr. Manoj | Hindi | | |
| 2001 | Jaane Anjaane | Pankaj Vashisht | Hindi | | ' |
| 2000–2002 | Aabhalmaya | Nishant Mahajan | Marathi | | |
| 2002–2005 | Avantika | Abhishek Jahagirdaar | Marathi | | |
| 2003–2004 | Ek Hota Raja | Jai | Hindi | | |
| 2011 | Comedy Ka Maha Muqabala | Judge | Hindi | | |
| 2013 | Jhunj Marathmoli | Host | Marathi | | |
| 2015 | Tumcha Aamcha Same Asta | —N/a | Marathi | Producer | |
| 2017 | Partners Trouble Ho Gayi Double | Himself | Hindi | Guest appearance | |
| 2017 | The Great Indian Laughter Challenge | Judge | Hindi | | |
| 2019 | My Name Ijj Lakhan | Lakhan | Hindi | | |
| 2021–2023 | Majhi Tujhi Reshimgath | Yashvardhan "Yash" Choudhary | Marathi | | |
| 2025–present | Chal Bhava Cityt | Host | Marathi | | |

=== Web series ===
- All series are in Hindi unless otherwise noted.

| Year | Title | Role | Notes | Ref. |
|---|---|---|---|---|
| 2018 | Baby Come Naa | Aditya Tendulkar | | |
| 2021 | Teen Do Paanch | Vishal Sahu | | |
| 2024 | Zindaginama | Mukul | Episode: "Swagatam" | |

=== Dubbing roles ===
| Year | Title | Role | Original language | Dubbing language | Ref. |
|---|---|---|---|---|---|
| 2019 | The Lion King | Timon | English | Hindi | |
| 2021 | Pushpa: The Rise | Pushpa Raj | Telugu | Hindi | |
| 2024 | Pushpa 2: The Rule | Pushpa Raj | Telugu | Hindi | |
| 2024 | Mufasa: The Lion King | Timon | English | Hindi | |

== Accolades ==
| Year | Film | Award | Category | Result | Ref. |
|---|---|---|---|---|---|
| 2002 | Resham Gaath | Maharashtra State Film Awards | Best Actor | Won | |
| 2005 | Iqbal | Filmfare Awards | Best Male Debut | Nominated | |
| 2006 | Iqbal | Zee Cine Awards | Best Actor (Critics) | Won | |
| 2007 | Dor | Screen Awards | Best Comedian | Won | |
| 2008 | Om Shanti Om | Filmfare Awards | Best Supporting Actor | Nominated | |
| 2008 | Om Shanti Om | International Indian Film Academy Awards | Best Supporting Actor | Nominated | |
| 2008 | Om Shanti Om | Zee Cine Awards | Best Supporting Actor | Nominated | |
| 2008 | Om Shanti Om | Stardust Awards | Best Breakthrough Performance - Male | Won | |
| 2021 | Majhi Tujhi Reshimgath | Zee Marathi Utsav Natyancha Awards | Best Actor | Won | |
| 2021 | Majhi Tujhi Reshimgath | Zee Marathi Utsav Natyancha Awards | Best Friend | Won | |
| 2022 | Kaun Pravin Tambe? | Filmfare OTT Awards | Best Actor in a Web Original Film (Male) | Nominated | |
