= List of accolades received by Jab We Met =

Jab We Met awards and nominations
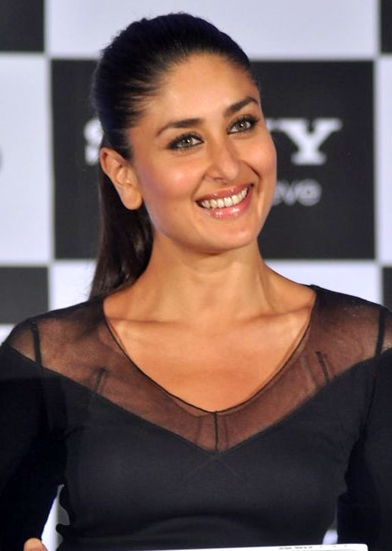
- Kareena Kapoor garnered several accolades for her performance in Jab We Met.
Awards and nominations
Award	Wins	Nominations
Filmfare Awards	2	7
International Indian Film Academy Awards	2	7
National Film Awards	2	2
Producers Guild Film Awards	3	9
Screen Awards	1	6
Stardust Awards	3	6
Zee Cine Awards	3	8

Totals (Note: Certain award groups do not simply award one winner. They acknowledge several different recipients, have runners-up, and have third place. Since this is a specific recognition and is different from losing an award, runner-up mentions are considered wins in this award tally. For simplification and to avoid errors, each award in this list has been presumed to have had a prior nomination.)
- Wins: 16
- Nominations: 45

Jab We Met (transl. When We Met) is a 2007 Indian Hindi-language romantic comedy film written and directed by Imtiaz Ali and produced by Dhilin Mehta under his banner Shree Ashtavinayak Cine Vision. The film stars Shahid Kapoor and Kareena Kapoor with Tarun Arora, Saumya Tandon and Dara Singh in supporting roles.

Primarily based in Mumbai, Bhatinda, and Shimla, the film tells the story of Aditya Kashyap, a heartbroken businessman who boards a train, where he meets a talkative Punjabi girl Geet Dhillon. While they miss their train, Geet and Aditya begin a journey together to her home and what follows is a love that changes them. Jab We Met received widespread critical acclaim and was a success at the box office, with a gross of ₹50.9 million (US$530,000). It among the top-grossing Hindi films of the year.

The film received several accolades. At the 55th National Film Awards in 2008, Shreya Ghoshal won National Film Award for Best Female Playback Singer and Saroj Khan won National Film Award for Best Choreography, both for Yeh Ishq Haay. At the 53rd Filmfare Awards, Jab We Met received seven nominations and won Best Actress (Kareena Kapoor) and Best Dialogue (Ali). At the 9th IIFA Awards, Jab We Met received seven nominations and won Best Actress (Kareena Kapoor) and Best Dialogue (Ali). Jab We Met also earned three Producers Guild Film Awards, one Screen Awards, three Stardust Awards, and three Zee Cine Awards.

== Awards and nominations ==
Award	Date of ceremony (Note: Date is linked to the article about the awards held that year, wherever possible.)	Category	Recipient(s)	Result	Ref.
Filmfare Awards	16 February 2008	Best Film	Jab We Met	Nominated	
Filmfare Awards	16 February 2008	Best Director	Imtiaz Ali	Nominated	
Filmfare Awards	16 February 2008	Best Actor	Shahid Kapoor	Nominated	
Filmfare Awards	16 February 2008	Best Actress	Kareena Kapoor	Won	
Filmfare Awards	16 February 2008	Best Music Director	Pritam	Nominated	
Filmfare Awards	16 February 2008	Best Female Playback Singer	Shreya Ghoshal (for the song "Yeh Ishq Haye")	Nominated	
Filmfare Awards	16 February 2008	Best Dialogue	Imtiaz Ali	Won	
International Indian Film Academy Awards	6 – 8 June 2008	Best Film	Jab We Met	Nominated	
International Indian Film Academy Awards	6 – 8 June 2008	Best Director	Imtiaz Ali	Nominated	
International Indian Film Academy Awards	6 – 8 June 2008	Best Actor	Shahid Kapoor	Nominated	
International Indian Film Academy Awards	6 – 8 June 2008	Best Actress	Kareena Kapoor	Won	
International Indian Film Academy Awards	6 – 8 June 2008	Best Female Playback Singer	Shreya Ghoshal (for the song "Yeh Ishq Haye")	Nominated	
International Indian Film Academy Awards	6 – 8 June 2008	Best Story	Imtiaz Ali	Nominated	
International Indian Film Academy Awards	6 – 8 June 2008	Best Dialogue	Imtiaz Ali	Won	
National Film Awards	21 October 2009	Best Female Playback Singer	Shreya Ghoshal (for the song "Yeh Ishq Haye")	Won	
National Film Awards	21 October 2009	Best Choreography	Saroj Khan (for the song "Yeh Ishq Haye")	Won	
Producers Guild Film Awards (Note: Previously known as Apsara Film & Television Producers Guild Awards.)	30 March 2008	Best Film	Jab We Met	Nominated	
Producers Guild Film Awards	30 March 2008	Best Director	Imtiaz Ali	Won	
Producers Guild Film Awards	30 March 2008	Best Dialogue	Imtiaz Ali	Nominated	
Producers Guild Film Awards	30 March 2008	Best Screenplay	Imtiaz Ali	Nominated	
Producers Guild Film Awards	30 March 2008	Best Actor in a Leading Role	Shahid Kapoor	Nominated	
Producers Guild Film Awards	30 March 2008	Best Actress in a Leading Role	Kareena Kapoor	Won	
Producers Guild Film Awards	30 March 2008	Best Music Director	Pritam	Won	
Producers Guild Film Awards	30 March 2008	Best Female Playback Singer	Shreya Ghoshal (for the song "Yeh Ishq Haye")	Nominated	
Producers Guild Film Awards	30 March 2008	Best Choreography	Bosco-Caesar (for the song "Mauja Hi Mauja")	Nominated	
Screen Awards	10 January 2008	Best Actor	Shahid Kapoor	Nominated	
Screen Awards	10 January 2008	Best Actress	Kareena Kapoor	Won	
Screen Awards	10 January 2008	Best Female Playback Singer	Shreya Ghoshal (for the song "Yeh Ishq Haye")	Nominated	
Screen Awards	10 January 2008	Best Story	Imtiaz Ali	Nominated	
Screen Awards	10 January 2008	Best Screenplay	Imtiaz Ali	Nominated	
Screen Awards	10 January 2008	Best Dialogue	Imtiaz Ali	Nominated	
Stardust Awards	25 January 2008	Best Film	Jab We Met	Won	
Stardust Awards	25 January 2008	Hottest Young Filmmaker	Imtiaz Ali	Nominated	
Stardust Awards	25 January 2008	Star of the Year – Male	Shahid Kapoor	Nominated	
Stardust Awards	25 January 2008	Best Actor (Editor's Choice)	Shahid Kapoor	Won	
Stardust Awards	25 January 2008	Star of the Year – Female	Kareena Kapoor	Won	
Stardust Awards	25 January 2008	New Musical Sensation – Male	Mika Singh – "Mauja Hi Mauja" (also for "Ganpat" from Shootout at Lokhandwala)	Nominated	
Zee Cine Awards	26 April 2008	Best Film	Jab We Met	Nominated	
Zee Cine Awards	26 April 2008	Best Director	Imtiaz Ali	Nominated	
Zee Cine Awards	26 April 2008	Best Screenplay	Imtiaz Ali	Won	
Zee Cine Awards	26 April 2008	Best Actor – Male	Shahid Kapoor	Nominated	
Zee Cine Awards	26 April 2008	Best Actor – Female	Kareena Kapoor	Won	
Zee Cine Awards	26 April 2008	Best Music Director	Pritam	Nominated	
Zee Cine Awards	26 April 2008	Best Playback Singer – Female	Shreya Ghoshal (for the song "Yeh Ishq Haye")	Nominated	
Zee Cine Awards	26 April 2008	Best Track of the Year	Pritam (for the song "Mauja Hi Mauja")	Won	
