= Agnipankh =

- Directed by: Sanjiv Puri
- Screenplay by: Manoj Tyagi; Sanjiv Puri
- Produced by: Seema Kar; Dhilin Mehta
- Starring: Jimmy Sheirgill; Shamita Shetty; Akshay Anand; Rahul Dev; Sameer Dharmadhikari
- Cinematography: Inderjeet Bansal
- Edited by: Amit Saxena
- Music by: Songs: Pritam; Background Score: Salim–Sulaiman
- Production company: Shree Ashtavinayak Cine Vision
- Release date: 27 February 2004
- Language: Hindi
- Budget: ₹170 million (US$1.8 million)
- Box office: ₹280 million (US$2.9 million)

Agnipankh (The Wings of Fire) is a 2004 Indian Hindi-language action film written and directed by Sanjiv Puri. The film revolves around pilots in the Indian Air Force. It is produced by Dhilin Mehta and Seema Kar under Shree Ashtavinayak Cine Vision Limited, and stars Jimmy Sheirgill, Sameer Dharmadhikari and Rahul Dev.

== Synopsis ==
The film opens with a tribute to Wg. Cdr. Rakesh Rustogi and to the other martyrs of the Indian Air Force. The scene then shifts to Air Force Station Srinagar in Jammu and Kashmir with Flying Officer Siddharth Singh in his MiG-21 aircraft preparing for a recce mission. The mission is successful, but Siddharth gets hit by a SAM, yet he manages to safely land his aircraft. Upon arriving back to Srinagar, he is confronted by his rival, colleague, and another fighter pilot named Flying Officer Sameer Kelkar. Siddharth's mother worries about his safety and confronts him regarding the hazards in his profession, but Siddharth brushes it off. He and his father later discuss the mission and the general atmosphere in Kashmir.

The scene later shifts to a golf match where two senior Air Force officers are discussing recent border violations and the warlike state in Kashmir; however, this discussion gets overheard by a Pakistani spy who reports it to his superiors. The Pakistani Army deduces that the Indian Air Force plans to initiate its future course of action based on the information obtained from the recce missions. Thus, to gain further insight into Indian planning, the Pakistan Army sends its most capable spy to infiltrate the IAF's Srinagar Airbase. Here Flight Lieutenant Anjana "Anjie" Rawat, a tomboyish helicopter pilot, is introduced. A soap opera motif is shown where Anjana loves Sameer but he does not reciprocate, but he has feelings for Surabhi, a wealthy socialite who has feelings for Siddharth. At this juncture, Siddharth and Sameer's close friend Flight lieutenant Vishal Dev is introduced. Vishal is newly posted to Srinagar; he arrives with his wife Nupur.

Meanwhile, the Pakistani spy gets employed at the Srinagar Airbase, from where he keeps sending critical information to his superiors in Pakistan. Sensing a sudden change in climate over Line of Control, the IAF anticipates that Pakistan will launch its first attack aerially with Srinagar as its main target. The security around and in the base is tightened. IAF launches more recce missions to gain more intelligence. However, one such mission consisting of Vishal and Siddharth ends up in a failure with Vishal getting shot down over enemy territory and presumably getting killed, thus resulting in Siddharth getting relieved of his flying status and being indefinitely grounded by the AOC. It is later revealed that Sameer had confided Siddharth's infidelities to Surabhi, making her break up with him, which ultimately led to Siddharth fumbling the mission. Sameer, feeling guilty, confesses the truth about Siddharth to Surabhi, thus bringing Siddarth and Surabhi together.

Meanwhile, terrorists launch multiple attacks on the airbase but are always thwarted. The Pakistan Army deduces that for a successful aerial attack, the radar in Srinagar Airbase must be destroyed; hence, the spy in the guise of a senior Air Force officer allows several terrorists to infiltrate the Airbase's sensitive areas, but their plan is foiled by Siddharth and Sameer. Seeing their plans fail, Pakistan launches full-scale aerial attacks over eleven IAF bases, thus prompting the IAF to retaliate. Siddharth and Sameer, as a part of the Special Mission, are sent to destroy a Pakistani ammo dump, which will disrupt supplies to Pakistan forces. In the mission, however, both Siddharth and Sameer are shot down by enemy aircraft during a dogfight; both of them ejected safely but are held captives in a Pakistani POW camp. In the POW camp, Siddharth and Sameer are tortured regularly by Pakistan Army senior officers for not giving them more information and placed with other Indian prisoners. However, Siddharth and Sameer manage to escape the prison with the help of a 1971 war veteran Army officer, Lieutenant Sangram Singh Shekhawat of the 6th Rajput Regiment. En route, they meet Vishal, who was presumed dead but, in reality, was hiding from the Pakistani soldiers.

The prisoners then successfully contact the Indian Army's 3rd Battalion, The Grenadiers, with the help of a radio stolen from the enemy, but also invariably end up revealing their position to the Pakistan Army, which launches a manhunt to apprehend them. After learning about their existence, the IAF, with the help of Para Commandos of the Indian Army, launches a joint SAR mission inside the enemy territory. However, in the following firefight, while escaping, Vishal and the 1971 war veteran are killed, but Siddharth and Sameer are successfully rescued by Para Commnados and a squadron of Mi-17 helicopters piloted by Anjana. The prisoners are brought home, where they are honoured and felicitated by the Indian Government. The film ends with Siddharth and Sameer going on their next mission.

== Cast ==
- Jimmy Sheirgill as Flying Officer Siddharth "Sid" "Sidy" Singh Fighter pilot
- Sameer Dharmadhikari as Flying Officer Sameer "Sam" "Sammy" Kelkar fighter pilot
- Rahul Dev as Flight Lieutenant Vishal Dev fighter pilot
- Shamita Shetty as Flight Lieutenant Anjana Rawat / Anjana Kelkar helicopter pilot
- Richa Pallod as Surabhi Dhar / Surabhi Singh
- Divya Dutta as Nupur Vishal Dev
- Kulbhushan Kharbanda as Air Vice Marshal Amod Mehta
- Kiran Kumar as Lieutenant Sangram Singh Shekhawat, 6th Rajput Regiment, Indo-Pakistani war of 1971 veteran
- Vrajesh Hirjee as Ittefaq
- Ashish Vidyarthi as Haider Baluchi, Pakistan Army Sniper
- Daya Shankar Pandey as Fateh Afghani, ISI Agent
- Shrivallabh Vyas as Firoz Ali Niyazi, Pakistan Army Officer
- Akshay Anand as Flight Lieutenant Charlie
- Anang Desai as Mr.LK Singh, Siddarth's father
- Neelu Kohli as Mrs. Dhristi Singh, Siddarth's mother
- Vishwajeet Pradhan as Squadron Leader Vivek Sawant
- Benjamin Gilani as Group Captain Anil Sehgal
- S. P. Lalwani as Flight Instructor
- Bakul Thakkar as Flight Lieutenant Kunal Tiwari
- Bhavin Thakkar as Zoor
- Sunil Upadhyay as Instructor
- Sanjeev Puri as Major Bhullar
- Kuldeep Dubey as Flight Lieutenant Kuldeep
- Dawood Khan as Rehmat
- Shailendra Srivastav as Tahir
- Vikram Sahu as Kuldeep Sharma
- Prashant Pathak as Mr. Qureshi
- Adil Rana as Pakistan Air Force Officer
- Vijendra Gill as Haider Baluchi's Assistant
- Dinesh Bagadi as Haider Baluchi's Assistant
- Fazal Sheikh as Haider Baluchi's Assistant
- Raju Patel as Indian Flight Lieutenant
- Deepak Divekar as Pakistani General
- Shravani Goswami as Indian Flight Lieutenant
- Smita Patade as Indian Flight Lieutenant
- Sheel Mathur as Interrogator
- Deepika as Mrs. Singh Shekhawat

== Soundtrack ==
Agnipankh

Soundtrack album by Pritam
- Released: 27 February 2004
- Genre: filmi
- Length: 43:28
- Label: Das Music

Pritam chronology
Fun 2shh: Dudes in the 10th Century (2003)	Agnipankh (2004)	Raghu Romeo (2004)

All music is composed by Pritam.

No.	Title	Singer(s)	Length
1.	"Janm Bhumi Pe Jaan Lutate Hai"	Kavita Krishnamurthy	4:42
2.	"Mera Dil Fida Hai Tujhpe" ((Version 1))	Udit Narayan	4:35
3.	"Mera Dil Fida Hai Tujhpe" ((Version 2))	Vinod Rathod, Udit Narayan	4:28
4.	"Rabba"	Zubeen Garg, Jaspinder Narula, Kailash Kher	6:22
5.	"Ishg Ishg Mein"	Zubeen Garg, Salim Merchant, Kailash Kher, Jaspinder Narula	6:30
6.	"Zindagi Hai To Maut Aayegi"	Hariharan	5:22
7.	"Khamoshi Aashiqo Ki Hai Zabaan" ((Version 1))	Sonu Nigam, Alka Yagnik	5:44
8.	"Khamoshi Aashiqo Ki Hai Zabaan" ((Version 2))	Sonu Nigam, Sunidhi Chauhan	5:45
Total length:			43:28

== Reception ==
Taran Adarsh of IndiaFM gave the film 1 out of 5 stars, writing, "On the whole, AGNI PANKH is bound to go unnoticed since the flaws outnumber and outweigh the assets. Below average."
