= Maine Pyaar Kyun Kiya? =

2005 Indian film by David Dhawan

Maine Pyaar Kyun Kiya
- Directed by: David Dhawan
- Written by: Sanjay Chhel; Rumi Jaffery
- Story by: Abe Burrows
- Based on: Cactus Flower by Abe Burrows
- Produced by: Sohail Khan; Dhillin Mehta
- Starring: Salman Khan; Sushmita Sen; Katrina Kaif; Sohail Khan; Arshad Warsi; Isha Koppikar
- Cinematography: Vikas Sivaraman
- Edited by: Nitin Rokade
- Music by: Songs: Himesh Reshammiya; Background Score: Salim–Sulaiman
- Production companies: Shree Ashtavinayak Cine Vision; Sohail Khan Productions
- Distributed by: Shree Ashtavinayak Cine Vision
- Release date: 15 July 2005
- Running time: 138 minutes
- Country: India
- Language: Hindi
- Budget: ₹15 crore
- Box office: ₹55 crore

Maine Pyaar Kyun Kiya (transl. Why Did I Fall In Love?) is a 2005 Indian Hindi-language romantic comedy film directed by David Dhawan. It is a remake of the 1969 American film, Cactus Flower which was an adaptation of the 1965 play of the same name by Abe Burrows, itself based on the French play Fleur de cactus by Pierre Barillet and Jean-Pierre Gredy.

It stars Salman Khan, Sushmita Sen and Katrina Kaif along with Sohail Khan, Arshad Warsi, Beena Kak, Rajpal Yadav and Isha Koppikar in supporting roles. The film revolves around the relationships of a womanizing doctor who gets ultimately stuck between two women: a patient with suicidal tendencies and his nurse.

== Plot ==
Although Sameer’s charm catches the eye of female patients Naina stays unimpressed. Naina, devoted to Naina’s responsibilities as a nurse does not let Sameer’s appeal pull Naina away. Naina keeps Naina’s focus on work. Remains separate, from Sameer’s other admirers.

Whenever a girl gets too close to Sameer and starts talking about marriage, he sends her off by telling her he is already married. However, one day, he meets Sonia, a beautiful young woman and Sameer is smitten. He lies to her about having a wife, but the marriage is failing. When she learns of his 'wife', she wants to meet her. Sameer introduces Naina, as well as her niece and nephew, as his wife and children.

Sameer then arranges a fake divorce from his fake wife with the help of his best friend, lawyer Vicky who, despite having a steady girlfriend, frequently flirts with Naina. To complicate things further, Sameer's mother suddenly appears and doesn't want her son get divorced from Naina (when he is not married to her in the first place). And then, there is Sonia's neighbour Pyare, who does not want Sonia to marry Sameer: he wants Sonia for himself and she seems to like him, too.

The web of lies around everyone grows thicker and thicker, but finally, Sameer is able to persuade Sonia to marry him. Before leaving for the airport, Naina confronts Sonia and reveals the web of lies formed by Sameer, to persuade Sonia for marriage. At the altar, Sonia makes Sameer realize that she isn't the right wife for him but Naina who has proved her love since she played along, pretending to be his wife. Sameer agrees and rushes to the airport because Naina wants to escape to Canada, while Sonia marries Pyare. At the airport, Sameer arrives in time: he apologizes to Naina and convinces her to stay. Naina agrees to stay with Sameer and his family.

== Cast ==
- Salman Khan as Dr. Sameer Malhotra
- Sushmita Sen as Naina Kapoor: Sameer's nurse and fake wife
- Katrina Kaif as Sonia Bhardwaj: Sameer's girlfriend
- Sohail Khan as Pyare Mohan Singh: Sonia's neighbour
- Beena Kak as Anjali Malhotra: Sameer's mother
- Arshad Warsi as Vikrant "Vicky" Roy
- Isha Koppikar as Nishi Gupta
- Rajpal Yadav as Army soldier Pramod Kumar Thapar aka Thapa: Sameer's patient
- Arbaaz Khan as Shrikant Sharma (guest appearance)
- Dolly Bindra as Dolly Verma: Naina's friend
- G. P. Singh as Judge Brahmadutt Gupta
- Vindu Dara Singh as Angry Bar Patron (cameo)

== Soundtrack ==
Maine Pyaar Kyun Kiya?

Soundtrack album by Himesh Reshammiya
- Released: 24 May 2005
- Recorded: 2005
- Venue: Mumbai
- Genre: Feature film soundtrack
- Label: T-Series
- Producer: Himesh Reshammiya

Himesh Reshammiya chronology
Silsiilay (2005)	Maine Pyaar Kyun Kiya? (2005)	Iqbal (2005)
- Sameer (Lyricist); Salim–Sulaiman Background Score

Professional ratings
Review scores
Source	Rating
Planet Bollywood	3.5/5 stars

The soundtrack consists of 7 original tracks and 4 remixes composed by Himesh Reshammiya According to the Indian trade website Box Office India, with around 1,250,000 units sold, this film's soundtrack album was one of the year's best-selling.

=== Track list ===
No.	Title	Singer(s)	Length
1.	"Dil Di Nazar"	Shaan, Priya Darshini, Neeraj Shridhar, Shaznine	05:24
2.	"Ishq Chunariya (not in the film)"	Udit Narayan, Alka Yagnik	05:13
3.	"Just Chill"	Sonu Nigam, Jayesh Gandhi, Amrita Kak	05:26
4.	"Laga Prem Rog"	Alka Yagnik, Kamaal Khan	05:46
5.	"Sajan Tumse Pyar"	Udit Narayan, Alka Yagnik	04:26
6.	"Sajan Tumse Pyar"	Sonu Nigam, Alka Yagnik	05:47
7.	"Teri Meri Love Story"	Shaan, Sunidhi Chauhan, Babul Supriyo	04:59
8.	"Yeh Ladki"	Kamaal Khan, Sunidhi Chauhan	03:57
9.	"Dil Di Nazar" (Remix)	Shaan, Priya Darshini, Himesh, Neeraj Shridhar, Shaznine	04:39
10.	"Just Chill" (Remix)	Sonu Nigam, Jayesh Gandhi, Amrita Kak	04:46
11.	"Laga Prem Rog" (Remix)	Alka Yagnik, Kamaal Khan	05:36
12.	"Yeh Ladki" (Remix)	Kamaal Khan, Sunidhi Chauhan	03:26
Total length:			53:38

== Reception ==
A critic from Rediff.com wrote that "In terms of its body and colour, Maine Pyaar Kyun Kiya is a sunshine romantic comedy. It has it all -- cool, summery colours, trendy hip-shaking music, rocking choreography, pretty looking actors and amusing banter". Taran Adarsh of Bollywood Hungama wrote that the film "is a Salman Khan film all the way. The good looking actor has specialized at aimed-at-gallery roles and his performance plus charisma is what makes the goings-on so pleasurable".

== Box office ==
The film grossed 55 crores. It also emerged as the fifth-highest-grossing film of the year.

== Awards ==
Award	Category	Recipient	Result
Stardust Awards	Best Breakthrough Performance - Female	Katrina Kaif	Won
