= Khatta Meetha (2010 film) =

2010 Indian film by Priyadarshan

- Theatrical release poster
- Directed by: Priyadarshan
- Written by: Story and Screenplay: Priyadarshan; Dialogues: Jay Master
- Based on: Vellanakalude Nadu; by Sreenivasan
- Produced by: Dhilin Mehta; Twinkle Khanna
- Starring: Akshay Kumar; Trisha; Urvashi Sharma; Rajpal Yadav; Asrani
- Cinematography: V. Manikandan
- Edited by: Arun Kumar
- Music by: Songs: Pritam; Guest Composers: URL; Shani Arshad; Background Score: Ouseppachan
- Production companies: Shree Ashtavinayak Cine Vision; Hari Om Entertainment
- Distributed by: Eros International
- Release date: 23 July 2010
- Running time: 158 minutes
- Country: India
- Language: Hindi
- Budget: ₹35 crore
- Box office: ₹62.79 crore

Khatta Meetha (transl. Sour and Sweet) is a 2010 Indian Hindi-language political satire comedy film written and directed by Priyadarshan and produced by Dhilin Mehta and Twinkle Khanna under Shree Ashtavinayak Cine Vision Limited and Hari Om Entertainment.

A remake of Priyadarshan's 1988 film Vellanakalude Nadu, originally scripted by Sreenivasan, the film starred Akshay Kumar in his sixth collaboration with Priyadarshan after Hera Pheri (2000), Garam Masala (2005), Bhagam Bhag (2006), Bhool Bhulaiyaa (2007), and De Dana Dan (2009). Trisha (in her debut in Hindi cinema and the only Hindi film she has ever acted in), co-starred with Kumar, while Kulbhushan Kharbanda, Rajpal Yadav, Asrani, Johnny Lever, Aruna Irani, Urvashi Sharma, Makarand Deshpande, Jaideep Ahlawat, Manoj Joshi, Milind Gunaji, and Neeraj Vora feature in supporting roles.

The story follows Sachin Tichkule, a struggling contractor whose failure in making peace with the corrupt bureaucracy in town as well as strained relations with his ex-girlfriend and his family leads to misadventures that deprive him of his closest relations. However, as he begins to mend his ways, justice comes knocking on his door.

Released on 23 July 2010, Khatta Meetha opened to mixed reviews, and became an average grosser of 2010. However, over the years, after repeated telecast, Khatta Meetha has been rated as a cult classic, most notably due to the theme targeting corruption in public infrastructure works.

== Plot ==
Sachin Tichkule is a struggling Maharashtrian contractor in the bylanes of Phaltan, a small town in the district of Satara, who dreams big but has no chance of his dreams coming true as he doesn't have any money to bribe the bureaucracy. His family has lost faith in him, telling him to earn money through honest means. To make matters worse, the new Municipal Commissioner turns out to be his ex-girlfriend, Gehna Ganpule, who now hates him due to his wayward ways. When Sachin meets Gehna in her office, a flashback reveals that Sachin was an honest college student who was an ardent follower of Gandhian principles. His brothers-in-law Trigun Fatak, Suhas Vichare, and his elder brother Harish Tichkule were all responsible for a bridge collapse resulting in many fatalities and were helped by a politician named Sanjay Rana.

After putting the blame of the mishap on their driver, Vishwas Rao, they killed him, fearing he would reveal the truth. Meanwhile, Sanjay's lustful eyes fall on Sachin's sister Anjali. Sachin warns him to keep away from Anjali and slaps him. Meanwhile, a journalist named Azad Bhagat wants justice as his family was killed in that accident. Anjali is betrothed to Sanjay, unbeknownst to Sachin. When he confronts his father Ramakant Tichkule as to how the marriage is finalized to an evil man without his knowledge, he reprimands Sachin, saying he has no right to say anything as he has no money to marry his sister off. After losing touch with her, Sachin learns that Anjali has been attempting to contact him, and when he goes to their house one night, he is informed by the guard that they have gone out. While returning from Sanjay's house, he sees Azad sneaking out, but is left merely suspicious.

Shortly after Sachin ends up complicating matters with Gehna when she tried to commit suicide upon being arrested for a fraudulent set-up on his part and is hospitalized, Sachin breaks the truth about his disillusionment with his past principles and reconciles with Gehna as well as her elder brother Madhav.

A few days later, he learns that Anjali died in a gas explosion. While Ramakant is devastated, Sachin is suspicious and smells foul play in her death. He then meets Azad again at the municipal office in Gehna's presence, where he initially assumes he is a thief but soon learns of Azad's intentions from her about how he had acquired strong evidence that would help in putting the people involved in the bridge collapse behind bars from Sanjay's house, for which he sneaked into their house that day. They both then agree to help each other to reveal the corruption behind the faulty construction of the bridge.

Gehna and Azad file a case against the fraudsters, and the former files a petition in court to open an investigation. Learning of this, Trigun, Suhas, and Harish panic and point fingers to each other, but Sanjay assures them of protection and gets Gehna transferred to another city. He hires masked robbers who kill Azad while he is on his way to court. Sachin takes the fatally injured Azad to the hospital for treatment. At the hospital, while Azad is dying in Sachin's arms, he reveals that while he was stealing the evidence, he saw Anjali being raped by Sanjay's friends, and it's not clear whether she was murdered by her rapists while she escaped or she committed suicide.

Vowing vengeance against Sanjay, a shocked Sachin decides to search for the documents at Azad's house but finds them missing, prompting him to enlist the help of his sidekick Rangeela in a ploy to smoke them out. Attempting to make sure the evidence isn't revealed, Sanjay decides to hide it elsewhere. Sachin follows Sanjay and spots him fleeing with the bag full of evidence, whence a fight ensues between Sanjay and Sachin. As the fight escalates, the bag handle snaps, throwing away Sanjay on the road, who is then killed after being run over by a truck, and Sachin successfully retrieves the evidence.

With evidence retrieved, Trigun, Harish, and Suhas are arrested and taken away by police officers. At the mansion, the whole family, especially Sachin's sisters-in-law, begins belittling him, claiming he was jealous of them, and blaming him for tarnishing the family name. Sachin then argues back that his brothers decided to silence the journalists and the general public who'd bring out the truth by bribing and threatening them. He further argues that while their husbands are still alive behind bars where the wives can see them, the people who died in the bridge collapse incident are gone forever, and nothing can be done to bring them back and he had to deal with the pain of losing Anjali the most, considering that his brothers-in-law had a hand in her death and were not reprimanded.

Fully aware that others will strongly suspect that he did this to usurp the family mansion, Sachin decides to leave. Ramakant, realizing his honesty and trustworthiness, stops him and rekindles their relationship, saying that he is proud of him. As he gets out of the house, Sachin spots Gehna, who tells him that everyone at the office pressures her to give him work after knowing what he did, and that she remained a spinster waiting for him. She confesses her love for Sachin, and they decide to get married.

== Cast ==
- Akshay Kumar as Sachin Tichkule
- Trisha as Gehna Ganpule, Municipal Commissioner (Voice-over by Mona Ghosh Shetty)
- Rajpal Yadav as Rangeela
- Makrand Deshpande as Azad Bhagat, a journalist, who lost his family in the bridge collapse
- Asrani as Seth Karodimal
- Johnny Lever as Award Anshuman of Bhadrak Ghat
- Milind Gunaji as Suhas Vichare, Sachin's brother-in-law
- Aruna Irani as Sheetaladevi Tichkule, Sachin's mother
- Urvashi Sharma as Anjali Tichkule, Sachin's sister
- Manoj Joshi as Trigun Fatak, Sachin's brother-in-law
- Kulbhushan Kharbanda as Ramakant Tichkule, Sachin's father, who is a retired judge
- Tinu Anand as Vishwas Rao, driver
- Atul Parchure as Chintan
- Neeraj Vora as Madhav Ganpule, Gehna's elder brother
- Jaideep Ahlawat as Sanjay Rana
- Anupam Bhattacharya as Police Inspector
- Paritosh Sand as Harish Tichkule, Sachin's elder brother
- Anant Jog as Ramakant's brother-in-law
- Swatantra Bharat as Mr. Adiwarkar
- Preity Pundir as Sandhya Ganpule, Madhav's wife
- Pooja Bhatt as Subhadra Tichkule, Harish's wife
- Esha as Akanksha Vichare, Suhas's wife and Sachin's elder sister
- Geetha Vijayan as Gayatri Fatak, Trigun's wife
- Ajay Shah as Ajay
- Kanchan Pagare as Jadia
- Sanjay Belose as Gangya
- Satish as Joshi
- Nitin Desai as Lawyer
- Paresh Brahmabhatt as Peon
- Prafull as Gopi
- Nagesh Bhosle as Inspection Officer
- Pradeep Vengurlekar as Vigilance Officer
- Anand Ingale as Politician
- Kainaat Arora as the item girl in the song "Aila Re Aila"
- Amita Nangia as Geeta Bhosle

== Production ==
The film was shot in Phaltan and Panchgani, located in Maharashtra. The house where Akshay Kumar's character and his family lived was filmed at a palace in Phaltan, which is the ancestral home of Saibai, the first wife of Chhatrapati Shivaji Maharaj.

== Reception ==
=== Critical response ===
Upon release, the film received mixed reviews from critics. Rajeev Masand of CNN-IBN described it as a "schizophrenic" film. Sukanya Verma of Rediff gave it 2/5 saying, "The story with its baggage of generic turns and contrived twists manages to laugh the audience at many points but all seems too familiar in making its even-now significant point. In addition, it seems a tad too long at its three hours running time. Noyon Jyoti Parasara of AOL rated the film 1.5/5 and stated, "In no way does 'Khatta Meetha' look like a film made by a director who has made 80 films till date. Certainly not from a director who got a National Award barely a year back for 'Kanchivaram'. This one is a rather amateur product which is best avoided." Blessy Chettiar of DNA gave it a rating of 2/5 and said, "Khatta Meetha is a hotchpotch of too much drama and very little comedy". Nikhat Kazmi of the Times of India gave it the highest rating of 3.5/5 saying, "Tune off a bit for the tedious middle and you could be in for some fun and frolic in Khatta Meetha".

== Soundtrack ==
Khatta Meetha

Soundtrack album by Pritam
- Released: 2010
- Genre: Feature film soundtrack
- Label: T-Series

Pritam chronology
No Problem (2010)	Khatta Meetha (2010)	Once Upon a Time in Mumbaai (2010)

The film's soundtrack is composed by Pritam with lyrics penned by Irshad Kamil and Nitin Raikwar, with rapper U.R.L. composing and performing the Marathi rap on "Nana Chi Taang".

The song "Sajde Kiye" is sung by Roop Kumar Rathod and Harshdeep Kaur in the film version. The song "Bullshit", featured in the end credits, is inspired by singer Shehzad Roy's original songs; Roy rewrote and performed the song, which was guest-composed and rearranged by Pakistani musician Shani.

The song "Aila Re Aila" was recreated for the 2021 film Sooryavanshi, also starring Kumar, by Tanishk Bagchi.

Khatta Meetha track listing
No.	Title	Singer(s)	Length
1.	"Nana Chi Taang"	Kunal Ganjawala feat. U.R.L. (Rap Composition + Rap Lyrics + Rap Vocals)	5:01
2.	"Sajde Kiye"	K.K., Sunidhi Chauhan, Backing Vocals: Shahid Mallya	5:07
3.	"Bullshit (Music by: Shani Arshad)"	Shehzad Roy (Vocals + Lyrics)	3:55
4.	"Aila Re Aila"	Daler Mehndi and Kalpana Patowary	4:22
5.	"Nana Chi Taang" (Remix)	Kunal Ganjawala feat. U.R.L. (Rap Composition + Rap Lyrics + Rap Vocals)	4:05
6.	"Sajde Kiye" (Remix)	KK, Harshdeep Kaur and Suzanne D'Mello	4:39
7.	"Aila Re Aila" (Remix)	Daler Mehndi and Kalpana Patowary	4:00
8.	"Nachde Re" (instrumental)	DJ Suketu	3:09

== Awards and nominations ==
List of awards and nominations
Year	Award	Category	Recipient	Result	Ref.
2011	6th Producers Guild Awards	Best Male Playback Singer	KK for "Sajde Kiye"	Nominated	
2011	2011 Zee Cine Awards	Best Female Debut	Trisha	Nominated	
2011	56th Filmfare Awards	Filmfare Award for Best Female Debut	Trisha	Nominated	
2011	3rd Mirchi Music Awards	Best Item Song of the Year	"Aila Re Aila"	Nominated	

== Impact ==
Since its release, Khatta Meetha has made a large impact on meme culture, particularly when relating to poor quality construction of roads nationwide. Khatta Meetha is also noted as a comic satire that targets inefficient bureaucracy and corruption.
