= Bodyguard (soundtrack) =

- Soundtrack album cover

Soundtrack album by Himesh Reshammiya and Pritam
- Released: 27 July 2011
- Recorded: 2011
- Genre: Feature film soundtrack
- Length: 48:16
- Label: T-Series
- Producers: Atul Agnihotri; Alvira Agnihotri

Himesh Reshammiya chronology
Kajraare (2010)	Bodyguard (2011)	Damadamm! (2011)

Pritam chronology
Ready (2011)	Bodyguard (2011)	Mausam (2011)

Bodyguard is the soundtrack to the 2011 film of the same name directed by Siddique Ismail starring Salman Khan and Kareena Kapoor. The film's soundtrack is composed by Himesh Reshammiya and Pritam, with lyrics written by Shabbir Ahmed and Neelesh Misra. The 12-song soundtrack featured four tracks used in the film, while also accompanied by remixes, alternatives and a theme music. It was released by T-Series on 27 July 2011.

== Development ==
Initially Pritam was considered to score music for the film and had curated four tunes for the film, but due to creative differences with Salman and Siddique, the former chose Himesh Reshammiya to replace Pritam as the composer. Reshammiya had collaborated with Salman on several of his films, whose music became successful. However, their last collaboration was on Kyon Ki (2005) before parting ways with Salman due to creative differences; Bodyguard marked their reunion after six years. The film was also Reshammiya's only album not to be released under his own label HR Musik, as he was involved in the project in June 2011, and T-Series acquired the film's music rights for ₹6 crore. Since the film was set for Eid al-Fitr (31 August 2011) release, all the songs were composed within one-and-a-half months. Producer Atul Agnihotri had revealed that Pritam's composition for the film "I Love You" would be included in the soundtrack and the film as well, thereby Pritam becoming one of the contributors.

== Track listing ==
No.	Title	Lyrics	Music	Singer(s)	Length
1.	"Bodyguard"	Shabbir Ahmed	Himesh Reshammiya	Salman Khan, Band of Power	3:41
2.	"I Love You"	Neelesh Misra	Pritam	Ash King, Clinton Cerejo	4:20
3.	"Desi Beat"	Shabbir Ahmed	Himesh Reshammiya	Mika Singh, Amrita Kak	4:12
4.	"Teri Meri"	Shabbir Ahmed	Himesh Reshammiya	Rahat Fateh Ali Khan, Shreya Ghoshal	5:27
5.	"Desi Beat" (Remix)	Shabbir Ahmed	Himesh Reshammiya	Mika Singh, Amrita Kak	3:48
6.	"Teri Meri" (Reprise)	Shabbir Ahmed	Himesh Reshammiya	Rahat Fateh Ali Khan, Shreya Ghoshal	3:41
7.	"Teri Meri" (Remix)	Shabbir Ahmed	Himesh Reshammiya	Rahat Fateh Ali Khan, Shreya Ghoshal	5:27
8.	"Bodyguard" (Remix)	Shabbir Ahmed	Himesh Reshammiya	Salman Khan, Band of Power	3:28
9.	"Desi Beat" (Punjabi Hip-Hop Mix)	Shabbir Ahmed	Himesh Reshammiya	Alamgir Khan, Amrita Kak	3:58
10.	"I Love You" (Remix)	Neelesh Misra	Pritam	Ash King, Clinton Cerejo	4:20
11.	"I Love You" (Unplugged)	Neelesh Misra	Pritam	Shaan Mukherjee, Clinton Cerejo	4:11
12.	"Theme" (Instrumental)	—	Himesh Reshammiya	Instrumental	2:30
Total length:					48:16

== Reception ==
Upon release, the album received mixed reviews from critics. Joginder Tuteja from Bollywood Hungama gave it 4 out of 5 stars, concluding: "The music of Bodyguard has in it to be hugely popular amongst audience as it has everything for everybody." Devesh Sharma of Filmfare awarded it 3 out of 5 stars and wrote: "Himesh, despite being a little rusty, is back in action and let’s hope he continues what he is best at and keeps his acting ambitions under check." Karthik Srinivasan of Milliblog wrote: "the only other strength of the soundtrack is the fact that Himesh resisted singing any of the songs and is named only as the music composer".

On the other hand, Sukanya Verma of Rediff gave it 2 out of 5 stars and described it as "very average as it tries in vain to recreate Wanted's hit soundtrack." Similarly, Ruchika Kher of the Indo-Asian News Service also gave the album 2 stars and noted: "On the whole, the album is quite average. Though none of the songs is very bad, there isn't any that really stands out and grabs attention."

== Awards and nominations ==
Award	Category	Recipient	Result	Ref.
Apsara Film & Television Producers Guild Awards	Best Music Director	Himesh Reshammiya and Pritam	Nominated	
Apsara Film & Television Producers Guild Awards	Best Playback Singer (Male)	Rahat Fateh Ali Khan for "Teri Meri"	Nominated	
Apsara Film & Television Producers Guild Awards	Best Lyricist	Shabbir Ahmed for "Teri Meri"	Nominated	
BIG Star Entertainment Awards	Most Entertaining Music	Himesh Reshammiya	Nominated	
BIG Star Entertainment Awards	Most Entertaining Singer (Male)	Clinton Cerejo	Won	
BIG Star Entertainment Awards	Most Entertaining Singer (Female)	Shreya Ghoshal for "Teri Meri"	Won	
Filmfare Awards	Best Playback Singer (Male)	Rahat Fateh Ali Khan for "Teri Meri"	Nominated	
Filmfare Awards	Best Playback Singer (Female)	Shreya Ghoshal for "Teri Meri"	Nominated	
Global Indian Music Academy Awards	Best Film Song	"Teri Meri"	Nominated	
International Indian Film Academy Awards	Best Lyricist	Shabbir Ahmed for "Teri Meri"	Nominated	
International Indian Film Academy Awards	Best Playback Singer (Male)	Ash King for "I Love You"	Nominated	
International Indian Film Academy Awards	Best Playback Singer (Male)	Rahat Fateh Ali Khan for "Teri Meri"	Nominated	
International Indian Film Academy Awards	Best Playback Singer (Female)	Shreya Ghoshal for "Teri Meri	Won	
Lions Gold Awards	Favourite Music Director	Himesh Reshammiya	Won	
Lions Gold Awards	Favourite Lyricist	Shabbir Ahmed	Won	
Mirchi Music Awards	Album of The Year	Himesh Reshammiya, Pritam, Neelesh Misra, Shabbir Ahmed	Nominated	
Mirchi Music Awards	Male Vocalist of The Year	Rahat Fateh Ali Khan for "Teri Meri"	Nominated	
Mirchi Music Awards	Music Composer of The Year	Himesh Reshammiya for "Teri Meri"	Nominated	
Mirchi Music Awards	Lyricist of The Year	Shabbir Ahmed for "Teri Meri"	Nominated	
