= Superstar (2008 Hindi film) =

- Theatrical release poster
- Directed by: Rohit Jugraj
- Written by: Sudip Sharma; Anurag Mishra
- Story by: Rohit Jugraj; Kunal Khemu; Sudip Sharma; Rahul Singh
- Produced by: Dhilin Mehta
- Starring: Kunal Khemu; Tulip Joshi
- Cinematography: Piyush Shah
- Edited by: Arun Kumar
- Music by: Songs: Shamir Tandon; Background Score: Sanjoy Chowdhury
- Production company: Shree Ashtavinayak Cine Vision
- Distributed by: Shree Ashtavinayak Cine Vision
- Release date: 8 February 2008
- Country: India
- Language: Hindi

Superstar is a 2008 Indian Hindi-language drama film directed by Rohit Jugraj, starring Kunal Khemu and Tulip Joshi.

== Plot ==
Kunal Mehra lives a middle-classed lifestyle in Borivali, Mumbai, along with his disapproving dad, Purabi, and supportive mom, Kusum. He has a sweetheart in Mausam, an aspiring Journalist. Ever since he was 8 years of age, Kunal wanted to act in Bollywood movies much to his dad's displeasure. He did play the part of Bhagwan Shri Hanuman in a play in school, but has been not very successful in landing any major part in any movie. He gets a break when his look-alike, Karan Saxena, the leading man of his dad's production 'Super Star' has qualms about heights and is unable to act. Kunal steps into Karan's shoes, and even accompanies the unit to film in Bangkok, Thailand. Shortly thereafter the media explodes with the news that Karan has been injured, and Kunal has been killed in a car accident.

== Cast ==
- Kunal Khemu as Kunal Mehra / Karan Saxena (dual role)
- Tulip Joshi as Mausam
- Aushima Sawhney as Barkha
- Darshan Jariwala as M. G. Saxena, Karan's father
- Sharat Saxena as Purabi Abhiram Mehra, Kunal's father
- Reema Lagoo as Kusum Mehra, Kunal's mother
- Kishori Shahane as Mrs. Saxena, Karan's mother
- Vrajesh Hirjee as Mishra
- Zafar Karachiwala as Prashant
- Aman Verma as Vicky
- Anjan Srivastav as Sharmaji
- Sanjay Dutt in a special appearance as himself

== Reception ==
The film opened to mixed reviews. Sanyam Parmar's acting was highly praised by the critics. Taran Adarsh from Bollywood Hungama rated it 2/5, and said, "On the whole, Superstar is a strictly average fare." Rajeev Masand gave the film the same rating and concluded it as "a film that could have been so much more", although he noted that it should be given a chance. The Times of India gave it 3 stars out of 5 and wrote, "Watch the film for its moments and its performances. Director Rohit Jugraj (he directed James) handles the emotional sequences with great restraint, while Kunal Khemu touches your heart in both the roles." Rediff.com's reviewer Ameeta Gupta dismissed it as an average film. Baradwaj Rangan wrote, "I didn’t mind Super Star in general – a few scenes are nicely done, and more than a few lines have the polish that comes only from being carefully thought over – but I wish Jugraj had made up his mind about what he wanted to do."Khalid Mohamed from Hindustan Times wrote that "By the way, one of the two cinematographers’ names is credited as ‘Deadly’. Darshan Jariwalla as the creepy producer delivers the worst, hammy-clammy performance in his or anyone's career. Quotable dialogue includes the line, “This is not a motion picture..it’s a loose motion picture.” Really, really, really." Sify.com wrote that "Kunal is the lifeline of the show. His performance leaves you speechless! Tulip Joshi doesn't have much to do. Aushima Shwhney looks mature for Kunal. Darshan Jariwala is first-rate. Sharat Saxena leaves a mark, especially in the scene when Kunal comes visiting after the gruesome accident. Reema is good. Vrajesh Hirjee is effective. Zafar Karachiwala is a fine actor. Kishori Shahane deserved a better role. Anjan Srivastava gets a few scenes, which he performs well. Aman Verma too deserved a better part."

The film performed poorly at the box office.

== Soundtrack ==
All tracks were composed by Shamir Tandon with lyrics written by Vibha Singh and Shabbir Ahmed.

#	Title	Singer(s)	Notes
1	"Ajnabi"	Raaj	
2	"Don't I Love Or Do I Love U"	Adnan Sami, Sunidhi Chauhan	
3	"Mann Tu Talbat"	Hamza Farooqui	
4	"Aankhon Se Khawab Rooth Ker"	Ustad Sultan Khan, Rekha Bhardwaj	
5	"Rafa Dafa"	Shaan, Kunal Ganjawala, Amrita Kak, Sanjeevani	
6	"Mann Tu Talbat" (Remix)	Hamza Farooqui	Remixed by Nikhil Chinapa
7	"Mann Tu Talbat" (Electro Mix)	Hamza Farooqui	Remixed by Abhijit Vaghani
8	"Mann Tu Talbat" (Spanish Mix)	Hamza Farooqui	Remixed by Abhijit Vaghani
9	"Aankhon Se Khawab" (Ambient Mix)	Ustad Sultan Khan, Rekha Bhardwaj	Remixed by Abhijit Vaghani
10	"Dance Piece"		Instrumental
