= Kartam Bhugtam =

- Theatrical release poster
- Directed by: Soham P. Shah
- Written by: Soham Shah
- Starring: Madhoo; Shreyas Talpade; Vijay Raaz; Aksha Pardasany
- Cinematography: Santosh Thundiyil
- Edited by: Biren Jyoti Mohanty
- Music by: Shabbir Ahmed
- Production companies: Gandhar Films & Studio
- Release date: 17 May 2024
- Country: India
- Language: Hindi
- Box office: est. ₹1 crore

Kartam Bhugtam is a 2024 Indian Hindi-language psychological thriller film, written and directed by Soham P. Shah. The film stars Shreyas Talpade and Vijay Raaz in the lead roles, while Madhoo and Aksha Pardasany play other pivotal roles. Produced by Gandhar Films & Studio, the film was released on 17 May 2024.

== Synopsis ==
The film's title, "Kartam Bhugtam," which translates to "what goes around, comes around," not only encapsulates the essence of its narrative but also serves as a profound philosophical cornerstone. The story is woven around the immutable laws of karma and destiny, deeply rooted in the ancient wisdom of Vedic astrology. It is a cinematic exploration of the belief that every individual's actions—good, bad, or indifferent—inevitably shape their future. The film intricately portrays how the characters’ lives are intertwined with the cosmic dance of planetary influences, leading to a series of events that affirm the age-old Hindi adage, "Jaise karoge, waise bharoge" (Just as you sow, so shall you reap).

== Cast ==
- Shreyas Talpade as Dev Joshi
- Vijay Raaz as Anna
- Madhoo as Seema
- Aksha Pardasany as Jia
- Gaurav Daagar
- Rishabh Kohli
- Asha Bisariya

== Production ==
The film was officially announced in April 2024.

== Release ==
Kartam Bhugtam was theatrically released on 17 May 2024.

== Reception ==
Deepa Gahlot of Rediff.com rated 1.5/5 stars and observed, "If there is any actor who emerges from this wreck with his talent unscathed, it is Vijay Raaz."

Sana Farzeen's review in India Today gives Kartam Bhugtam 2.5 stars. The music is forgettable, lacking well-designed songs. The title track is haunting, but not in a good way, with repetitive lines. Background music, especially during Vijay Raaz's scenes, is too loud, relying on old-school scares. The film overemphasizes its karma message across languages. Likely more suited for satellite than theaters or OTT.

Ganesh Aaglave from Firstpost gave "Kartam Bhugtam" 2.5/5 stars, saying it has an intriguing plot but lacks execution.
