= God Tussi Great Ho =

2008 film by Rumi Jaffrey

- Theatrical release poster
- Directed by: Rumi Jaffery
- Screenplay by: Yunus Sajawal; Rumi Jaffery
- Dialogues by: Rumi Jaffery
- Story by: Yunus Sajawal
- Based on: Bruce Almighty by Tom Shadyac
- Produced by: Afzal Khan
- Starring: Amitabh Bachchan: Salman Khan; Priyanka Chopra; Sohail Khan
- Cinematography: Ashok Mehta
- Edited by: Ballu Saluja
- Music by: Songs: Sajid–Wajid; Score: Salim–Sulaiman
- Production company: Shabbo Arts
- Distributed by: Eros International; Reliance Entertainment
- Release date: 15 August 2008
- Running time: 153 minutes
- Country: India
- Language: Hindi
- Budget: ₹21 crore
- Box office: ₹25.61 crore

God Tussi Great Ho (transl. God you are great) is a 2008 Indian Hindi-language fantasy comedy film written and directed by Rumi Jaffery. The film stars Amitabh Bachchan, Salman Khan, Priyanka Chopra, and Sohail Khan. It is loosely based on the 2003 film Bruce Almighty. The film was released on 15 August 2008 and was a commercial success at the box-office.

== Plot ==
Arun Prajapati has been trying to be a successful TV anchor, but success has always eluded him. He blames God for this lack of success. Arun is head over heels in love with Alia Kapoor (Priyanka Chopra), who is a TV anchor and a well-known star working in the same channel, but he has never been able to express his love for her.

When Rocky is appointed as an anchor for the channel, Arun starts believing that Rocky will win Alia. Later, Arun is sacked from the channel after the launch of his new show was sabotaged by Rocky. He has nobody to blame but God Himself, whom he later meets in person. An argument ensues between the two, at the end of which God then decides to give Arun the power over all things for ten days, wherein Arun may prove that he is a better operator of the universe.

Arun uses this power to get his job back, put Rocky in an uneasy spot, and win Alia's heart. After God scolds him for only making things better for himself, Arun starts listening to people's prayers. He later realizes that considering each person's wishes individually would be too time-consuming, so to save time and effort, he grants everyone's wishes (including the wish of criminals to be free) and Rocky's wish for Alia to marry him. The criminals crash Rocky and Alia's wedding, and Alia is shot by one of the criminals.

Arun later asks God why everything is happening to him. God explains it is his own fault and that everyone cannot blame him for this. Arun feels bad, but God forgives him and starts his life over again. During the game show, he tricks Rocky into lying about loving Alia and exposes him for stealing his idea for the game show. He is exposed as a fraud and Alia turns on him. Alia then asks Arun a few questions and he lies lovingly, leading them to reconcile. Arun also realizes that Rocky may have been God himself in disguise, helping Arun realize his mistakes and bringing him and Alia closer.

== Cast ==
- Amitabh Bachchan as God
- Salman Khan as Arun Prajapati, a struggling news anchor who blames God for his problems until he is given his powers for ten days God TV host channel zone host
- Priyanka Chopra as Alia Kapoor, a successful news anchor and Arun’s love interest
- Sohail Khan as Rakesh "Rocky" Sharma, Another news anchor who is also in love with Alia and is Arun’s rival
- Anupam Kher as Jagmohan Prajapati
- Dalip Tahil as Jagdish Kewalchandani
- Beena Kak as Rashmi Prajapati
- Upasana Singh as Divya Singh
- Rukhsar Rehman as Madhu Prajapati, Arun's sister, Jagmohan and Rashmi's daughter
- Sanjay Mishra as Murari Sadhu, Rocky’s sidekick
- Rajpal Yadav as Rangeela Prakash
- Satish Kaushik as Politician Bhola Ram "Netaji" Sacha

== Soundtrack ==
God Tussi Great Ho

Soundtrack album by Sajid–Wajid
- Released: 18 July 2008 (India)
- Genre: Feature film soundtrack
- Label: T-Series
- Producer: Sajid–Wajid

Sajid–Wajid chronology
| Welcome (2007) | God Tussi Great Ho (2008) | Hello (2008) |

=== Track listing ===
All music is composed by Sajid–Wajid

| No. | Title | Lyrics | Singer(s) | Length |
|---|---|---|---|---|
| 1. | "Let's Party" | Jalees Sherwani | Shaan, Sunidhi Chauhan | 4:56 |
| 2. | "Tujhe Aksa Beach Ghuma Doon" | Shabbir Ahmed | Wajid, Amrita Kak | 4:10 |
| 3. | "God Tussi Great Ho" | Shabbir Ahmed | Sonu Nigam, Shankar Mahadevan | 4:31 |
| 4. | "Tumko Dekha" | Jalees Sherwani | Neeraj Shridhar, Shreya Ghoshal | 5:34 |
| 5. | "Lal Chunariya" | Deven Shukla | Alka Yagnik, Udit Narayan | 4:18 |
| 6. | "Tujhe Aksa Beach Ghuma Doon (Remix)" | Shabbir Ahmed | Wajid, Amrita Kak | 3:58 |
| 7. | "Let's Party (Remix)" | Jalees Sherwani | Shaan, Sunidhi Chauhan | 4:34 |
| 8. | "God Tussi Great Ho (Remix)" | Shabbir Ahmed | Sonu Nigam, Shankar Mahadevan | 3:56 |
