= Jab We Met =

2007 Indian film by Imtiaz Ali

- Theatrical release poster
- Directed by: Imtiaz Ali
- Written by: Imtiaz Ali
- Produced by: Dhilin Mehta
- Starring: Kareena Kapoor; Shahid Kapoor
- Cinematography: Natarajan Subramaniam
- Edited by: Aarti Bajaj
- Music by: Songs: Pritam; Sandesh Shandilya; Score: Sanjoy Chowdhury
- Production company: Shree Ashtavinayak Cine Vision
- Distributed by: Viacom 18 Motion Pictures
- Release date: 26 October 2007
- Running time: 142 minutes
- Country: India
- Language: Hindi
- Budget: ₹15 crore
- Box office: ₹50.9 crore

Jab We Met (transl. When We Met) is a 2007 Indian Hindi-language romantic comedy film written and directed by Imtiaz Ali and produced by Dhilin Mehta under his banner Shree Ashtavinayak Cine Vision. The film stars Shahid Kapoor and Kareena Kapoor with Tarun Arora, Saumya Tandon, and Dara Singh in supporting roles.

Primarily set in Mumbai, Bhatinda and Shimla, the film tells the story of Aditya Kashyap, a heartbroken businessman who boards a train, where he meets a talkative Punjabi woman, Geet Dhillon. After missing their train, Geet and Aditya begin a journey together to her home, and what follows is a love that changes them. The music of the film is composed by Pritam, with lyrics written by Irshad Kamil.

Jab We Met was released in the United Kingdom a day before its worldwide release, on 25 October 2007. Upon its release, the film garnered widespread critical acclaim and was among the top-grossing Hindi films of the year, grossing over ₹50.9 crore. The film was later remade in Tamil as Kanden Kadhalai with a subsequent Telugu dubbed version titled Priya Priyathama.

The film received several accolades. At the 55th National Film Awards, the film won Best Female Playback Singer for Shreya Ghoshal and Best Choreography for Saroj Khan, both for the song "Yeh Ishq Hai". At the 53rd Filmfare Awards, Jab We Met received seven nominations and won two awards: Best Actress for Kareena Kapoor and Best Dialogue for Imtiaz Ali. Since its release in 2007, Jab We Met has gained cult status.

== Plot ==
Aditya Kashyap is the heir to a wealthy but troubled family. Depressed and reeling from his girlfriend marrying someone else, he drifts out of a company meeting, attends her wedding in a daze, then boards a random departing train from Chhatrapati Shivaji Terminus in Mumbai.

On the train, he meets Geet Dhillon, a lively and bubbly, albeit naive, young woman. Overwhelmed by her energy—and weighed down by his own despair—Aditya gets off the train late at night at a small wayside stop. Geet, trying to help him, tries to get him to board again before the train leaves. While they argue, the train departs, leaving them both stranded. Aditya helps her reach Ratlam Junction railway station to catch the train but in the chaos, Geet misses boarding again. Now stranded past midnight, Geet clings to Aditya for safety, stubbornly insisting he help her get all the way home to Bhatinda.

The two slowly become friends. Aditya reveals his mother left his father for another man, leaving both father and son embittered. Geet admits she plans to elope with her boyfriend Anshuman. Despite his initial irritation, Aditya begins to shake off his depression in Geet's cheerful company.

After traveling together for days, they arrive at Geet's family home in Batinda. Geet's family warmly takes Aditya in; to conceal his identity as a wealthy businessman, he introduces himself as a musician. Geet's family intends to arrange her marriage to a childhood friend, but she refuses. Determined to be with Anshuman, she runs away from home with Aditya and he drops her off at Manali, where Anshuman lives. There, he bids her farewell and returns to Mumbai.

The journey transforms Aditya's life: he reconciles with his estranged mother and finds new confidence in work, naming a new product line after Geet. He realizes she brought meaning and colour back into his world, and he has fallen in love with her.

Months later, Geet's family visits Aditya in Mumbai, distraught that she has been missing since she left home. Shocked, Aditya travels to Manali and confronts Anshuman, who admits he rejected Geet when she arrived unannounced, unwilling to marry her. Aditya eventually finds Geet in Shimla, working as a schoolteacher and living in seclusion.

He encourages her to regain her spark the same way she helped him regain his. Back in the hotel room, Geet is depressed, unable to forget Anshuman, so Aditya advises her to erase Anshuman from her life. She calls Anshuman and says offensive things towards him. As Geet is starting to heal, Anshuman reappears, hoping to reconcile. Geet is torn. The three travel to Bhatinda together, where Geet's family mistakes Aditya for her partner; liking him, they happily prepare for the marriage. Geet hesitates to reveal the truth as she witnesses the differences between Aditya and Anshuman. Ultimately, she realizes her love for Aditya and leaves Anshuman. Geet and Aditya marry, with their families’ blessings.

== Cast ==
- Shahid Kapoor as Aditya Kashyap
- Kareena Kapoor as Geet Dhillon
- Tarun Arora as Anshuman
- Saumya Tandon as Roop Kaur Dhillon, Geet's sister
- Dara Singh as Suryendra Singh Dhillon, Geet's grandfather
- Pavan Malhotra as Prem Singh Dhillon, Geet's uncle
- Kamal Tiwari as Gurpreet Singh Dhillon, Geet's father
- Kiran Juneja as Amrit Kaur Dhillon, Geet's mother
- Pravin Purva as Sarabjit Kaur Dhillon, Geet's grandmother
- Veer Pratap Singh as Manjeet Singh Maan, Geet's suitor
- Divya Seth as Ayesha Khanna, Dharamraj's ex-wife and Aditya's mother
- K.F. Jussawala as Advocate Shrikant Sharma, Ayesha's lawyer
- Nihar Thakkar as Raghav Dutta, Aditya's subordinate
- Manushka Khisty as Meher, Aditya's subordinate
- Vishal Om Sharma as Advocate Rohit Bhosle, Aditya's lawyer
- Wamiqa Gabbi as Geet and Roop's cousin
- Kishore Pradhan as Station Master
- Brijendra Kala as Taxi Driver
- Teddy Maurya as Hotel Receptionist and Policeman at Railway Station
- Asif Basra as Station Vendor 1

== Production ==
=== Development ===
In early 2007, the Shree Ashtavinayak Cine Vision Limited announced that director Imtiaz Ali would be directing the then real-life couple Kareena Kapoor and Shahid Kapoor in their first "full-fledged romantic drama". Teddy Maurya, worked as an art director on the film and later acted in it too.

=== Casting ===
I had also gone to Preity Zinta. Jab We Met was the most rejected film of my life. It was being rejected everywhere. It was when I narrated the film to Preity Zinta in her house, that she laughed. I thought she is laughing at me, mocking me! But she said it was really funny. So, I continued narrating. That was the first time somebody had complimented the film. So I owe it to her and whenever I meet her I give her a special hug and thank her that, You were the first person, who told me this film is ok. So Bobby and Preity Zinta is the pairing I wanted but it didn't happen.

— Imtiaz Ali

When Ali began casting for the film, Preity Zinta and Bobby Deol were his first choices to portray Dhillon and Kashyap respectively, but were eventually replaced by Kareena Kapoor and Shahid Kapoor respectively, the former when Zinta refused to do the film. While, Shahid Kapoor agreed to the film because he "loved the script", Kareena Kapoor revealed that Shahid "convinced" her to do the film. The film marked Shahid and Kareena's fourth project together after Fida (2004), 36 China Town (2006) and Chup Chup Ke (2006).

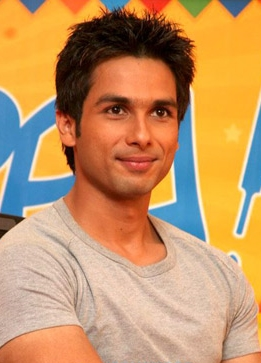
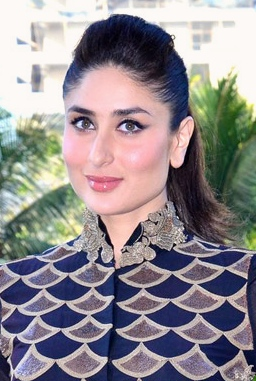
The film marked Shahid Kapoor and Kareena Kapoor's fourth collaborations

On the two lead actors, Ali commented, "I wanted a girl who could look natural in scenes where she misses the train. She had to be without make-up, someone who could be hyper, talkative and interesting but not irritating. I was never a fan of her [Kareena] and hadn't seen too many of her flicks, but I just knew Kareena was perfect as Geet [...] [On the other hand], When I met him [Shahid], I realised he wasn't the forgettable actor that he comes across in several of his movies. He has gone through a lot in life and that maturity had never been brought out. He was perfect for the role of a young, mature, quiet guy."

Tarun Arora was cast as Anshuman, opposite Kareena Kapoor. While, Saumya Tandon was cast as Geet's sister, Dara Singh as Geet's grandfather, Pavan Malhotra as Geet's uncle, Kamal Tiwari as Geet's father, Kiran Juneja as Geet's mother and Divya Seth as Aditya's mother.

=== Filming ===
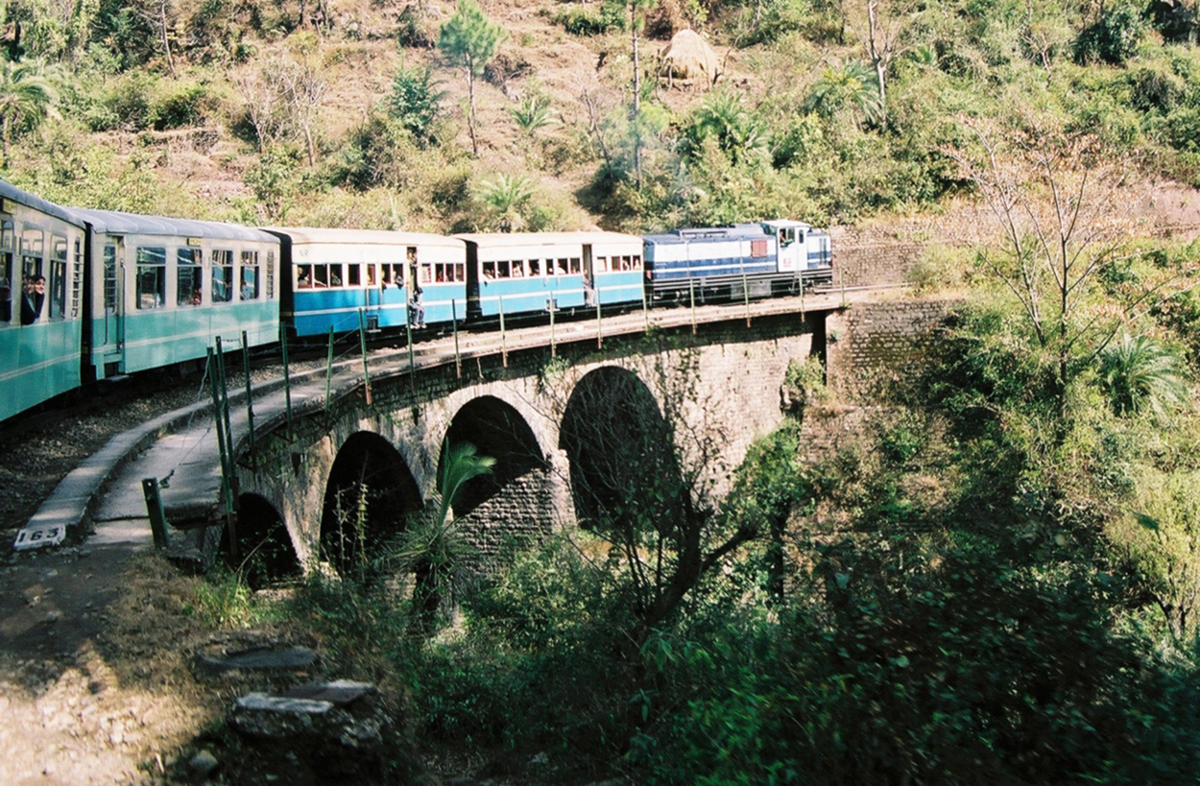
A portion of the film was shot in the Kalka–Shimla Railway

The film was shot throughout the Punjab region, and filming started on 20 March 2007 in Chandigarh and later headed to Shimla and Manali, where the crew filmed a song on the Himalayas and the Rohtang Pass. Manish Malhotra served as the costume designer. The summer shots in Punjab of the haveli were filmed in Nabha near Patiala. While shooting the last schedule of the film in Mumbai, sources had indicated that the lead pair had broken up. Though the media projected it as a publicity stunt for the film, it was later confirmed that the couple had indeed parted ways.

=== Post-production ===
To promote the film, the actors appeared separately on different television shows. Kareena Kapoor appeared as guest judge on the singing talent contest Sa Re Ga Ma Pa Challenge 2007 whilst Shahid Kapoor appeared on STAR Voice of India and Jhalak Dikhhla Jaa; they later appeared together on the television show Nach Baliye. Apart from this, the producers also painted two full local trains in Mumbai from the Western and Central lines with Jab We Met imagery, where Shahid Kapoor chatted up with fellow passengers and informed them about the film. The title of the film was decided by a popular vote; moviegoers had a choice between Punjab Mail, Ishq Via Bhatinda ('Love via Bhatinda') and Jab We Met (earlier titles of the film had included The Train, Geet and Geet Ready).

== Soundtrack ==
Jab We Met

Soundtrack album by Pritam
- Released: 21 September 2007 (India)
- Recorded: May 2005 – June 2006
- Studio: Zee Music Company
- Genre: Feature film soundtrack
- Length: 45:01
- Label: T-Series
- Producer: Dhillin Mehta

Pritam chronology
Bhool Bhulaiyaa (2007)	Jab We Met (2007)	Dus Kahaniyaan (2007)

Singles from Jab We Met
- 1. "Tum Se Hi" Released: 21 September 2007; 2. "Yeh Ishq Haye" Released: 21 September 2007

Imtiaz Ali initially approached A. R. Rahman to compose the score and soundtrack for the film. However Rahman declined the offer assuring Imtiaz that he would do Rockstar. The score was composed and produced by Sanjoy Chowdhury. The film featured a soundtrack composed by Pritam with lyrics by Irshad Kamil. Sandesh Shandilya composed one song. The track "Mauja hi Mauja" is based on raag Sindhu Bhairavi. The film's soundtrack was released on 21 September 2007 by Kareena Kapoor on the musical show Sa Re Ga Ma Pa Challenge 2007.

Jab We Met (Original Motion Picture Soundtrack)
No.	Title	Lyrics	Music	Singer(s)	Length
1.	"Mauja Hi Mauja"	Irshad Kamil	Pritam	Mika Singh	4:04
2.	"Tum Se Hi"	Irshad Kamil	Pritam	Mohit Chauhan	5:23
3.	"Yeh Ishq Haye"	Irshad Kamil	Pritam	Shreya Ghoshal	4:44
4.	"Nagada Nagada"	Irshad Kamil	Pritam	Sonu Nigam, Javed Ali	3:51
5.	"Aao Meelon Chalein"	Irshad Kamil	Pritam	Shaan, Ustad Sultan Khan	5:28
6.	"Aaoge Jab Tum"	Faaiz Anwar	Sandesh Shandilya	Rashid Khan	4:25
7.	"Tum Se Hi (Remix)"	Irshad Kamil	Pritam	Mohit Chauhan	4:21
8.	"Yeh Ishq Haye (Remix)"	Irshad Kamil	Pritam	Shreya Ghoshal, Antara Mitra	4:31
9.	"Mauja Hi Mauja (Remix)"	Irshad Kamil	Pritam	Mika Singh	4:07
10.	"Tum Se Hi (Instrumental)"	Irshad Kamil	Pritam	Instrumental	4:53
Total length:					44:27

=== Critical reception ===
The soundtrack mostly received positive reviews. Joginder Tuteja from India FM gave the music 3.5 out of 5 stars and said, "In 2007, Pritam may have come up with good music in number of films [...] But if there is one album that impresses most after Life in a... Metro and turns out to be the most satisfying experience, it is Jab We Met. The album is a perfect example of how to get a quality soundtrack which mixes songs for different segments of audience." Movietalkies.com rated the album 4 out of 5 stars, describing the album as "certainly one of the better albums that have come out this year ... Pritam has shown a depth and width of imagination in the manner in which he has used so many different genres and mixed them together to create a fascinating journey of music."

=== Charts and sales ===
The film's soundtrack debuted at number 8 and later jumped up to number 5 during its second week. Over the next several weeks, the album steadily began climbing up the music charts and saw the album sales increase after the film's release. During the week of 19 November the album replaced the soundtrack of Om Shanti Om and moved up to number 1 but fell back to number 2 the following week. Despite competition from the release of newer soundtracks, the album stayed at the top for over nine weeks.

According to the Indian trade website Box Office India, with around 19,00,000 units sold, this film's soundtrack album was the year's second highest-selling. Jab We Met's album was featured on Rediff's and IndiaFM's year-end list of 2007's Top 10 Music Albums.

== Release ==
Jab We Met was released on 25 October 2007. Moser Baer served as the DVD partner and regional distributor for Jab We Met. The film was officially released on DVD in the U.S., U.K., UAE and other international markets on 7 December 2007. A single disc collector's item in an enclosed box with the DVD containing English, Portuguese, Arabic, and Spanish subtitles was also released. The film was later made available on Amazon Prime Video. In 2024, the film was re-released in theatres as part of PVR-INOX's Valentine's Film Festival.

== Reception ==
=== Box office ===
Jab We Met opened with an opening of 70% all over India on 26 October 2007 and later increased to 90% during the weekend. Making a total first week net business of 11.75 crores from 350 cinemas, the film went into the second week with strong collections and saw a increase with 40%-50% increment in shows worldwide.

Continuing its strong march in week two with collections of over ₹90 million (US$930,000) and a two-week total of ₹210 million (US$2.2 million), the film was declared a hit. During its third week, Jab We Met managed to add another ₹20 million (US$210,000) to its collections but suffered a setback due to release of Om Shanti Om and Saawariya, which resulted in the number of shows for the film being reduced. Due to demand and the poor performance of the latter, the following week saw an increase in the number of prints for the film across the country, and resulted in a 50% increase of the film's collections. Completing 50 successful days at the box office on 14 December 2007. the film received a hit status by BoxOffice India.

By February 2008, Jab We Met had made a net business of over ₹310 million (US$10.9million), and emerged as one of the biggest hits of the year. On 30 January 2008, it was announced that to celebrate the success of its 100 days run at the box office, PVR Cinemas in Delhi would have a special screening of the film on Valentine's Day.

Meanwhile, Jab We Met also opened well internationally, especially in the U.K., where it was released a day before its worldwide release of 26 October. Debuting at number 10 in the U.K., the film grossed £11,488 on its previews night and £144,525 on its opening weekend, collecting a total of £156,013 from 31 screens. The film continued to do strong business and garnered excellent collections during its second week, making a two-week total of £325,996. Over the next five weeks, Jab We Met collected a total of £43,529 from 54 screens and made a grand total of £424,681.

=== Critical response ===
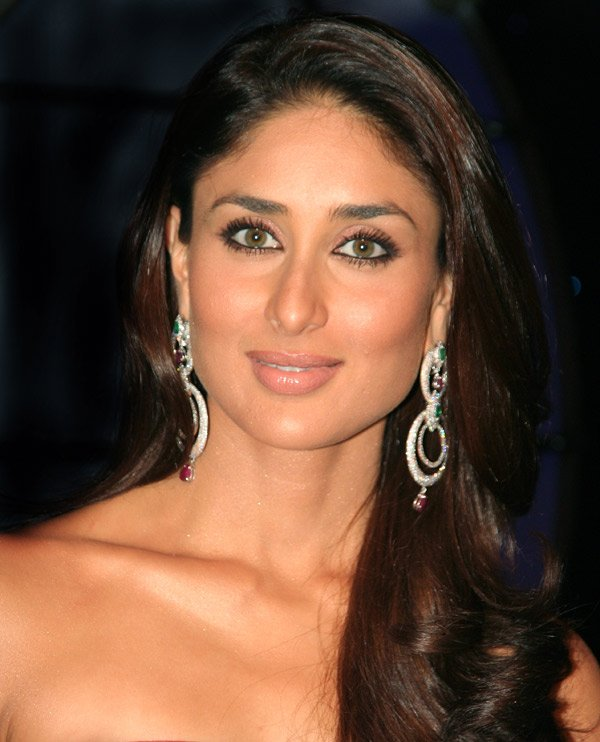
For her performance Kareena Kapoor garnered widespread critical acclaim which earned her several accolades including the Filmfare Award for Best Actress

Upon release, the film opened to widespread critical acclaim. Critics praised the film for its simplicity, its romance, saying that it was "one of the finest romantic films to come out of Bollywood in 2007". The film's direction and performances were particularly appreciated.

The Times of India gave the film 4 out of 5 stars concluding, "The film belongs to Kareena and Shahid who pitch in memorable performances and lend a whole new meaning to the boy-meets-girl story." Taran Adarsh from indiaFM gave the film a 3.5 out of 5 rating saying it is "as refreshing as an ice-cold watermelon juice in scorching heat." Subhash K. Jha wrote, "...Jab We Met is the kind of cinematic experience that is hard to come by in this day and age of smoky cynicism and borrowed rage."

Rajeev Masand from CNN-IBN, who gave the film 3 stars out of 5, described it as "a film bursting with the kind of lovely little moments that'll bring a smile to your face. Khaled Mohamed of Hindustan Times gave the film 3 out of 5 stars, saying the film, "is quite a delight, particularly for the chirpy-chirpy-cheep-cheep girl and the retentive, moan-groan boy. Directed with a flair for garnishing even the most abject of circumstances with humour and irony, here’s a feel-cool film. Wonderful.

Reviews towards the director, Imtiaz Ali, were favourable as well. Indiatimes wrote, "After his much-appreciated Socha Na Tha (2004), Imtiaz goes bigger and better and the result is nothing but flying colours".

Most critics agreed that the main highlight of the film was the leading pair and Kareena and Shahid's chemistry. Rajeev Masand further explained, "The real magic of this film lies in the performances of its two main leads who seize your attention from the moment they first appear on screen." Taran Adarsh commented, "Shahid delivers his career-best performance in Jab We Met... Kareena is in top form as well. Jab We Met is a turning point in her career. Fantabulous -- that's the right word to describe her work this time. The confidence with which she handles the contrasting characterization speaks volumes. This film should do for her what Kuch Kuch Hota Hai (1998) did for Kajol." Subhash K. Jha approved the chemistry as well, "...there are sparks...and the ones between Kareena and Shahid are so unselfconsciously genuine that you end up looking at the characters rather than the two actors going through a series of brilliantly conceived and energized incidents..."

Apart from critics, Jab We Met was hailed as one of the best films of 2007, according to various Bollywood film directors, such as Madhur Bhandarkar, David Dhawan, Rakeysh Omprakash Mehra, Anurag Basu and Sriram Raghavan.

== Accolades ==
Jab We Met received several accolades including, two National Film Awards, two Filmfare Awards and two IIFA Awards. The film also earned three Producers Guild Film Awards, three Stardust Awards, three Zee Cine Awards and one Screen Award.

== Remakes ==
Ashtavinayak announced that Jab We Met would be remade in four other languages: Tamil, Telugu, Kannada, and Malayalam. However, eventually it was only remade in Tamil as Kanden Kadhalai (2009) and subsequently dubbed in Telugu as Priya Priyathama. Starring Bharath and Tamannaah Bhatia, it was an average grosser. The film's plot later inspired the television show Love U Zindagi (2011), starring Sidharth Shukla and Pavitra Punia.

== Legacy ==
Jab We Met remains one of the most popular romantic comedies in Hindi cinema. The film was named as one of the Bollywood's top 10 most romantic movies by Yahoo! Movies and Vogue. Time Out placed the film in its "The 100 best Bollywood movies" list. Ineye Komonibo of Marie Claire listed it as one of the 43 best Bollywood movies of all time. Jasmine Ting of Cosmopolitan cited it as one of the best Indian films. ZEE5 listed it as one of the thirty evergreen Bollywood films that one should watch before they die. Shubhra Gupta featured the film in her book, ‘‘50 Films That Changed Bollywood’’.

Sampada Sharma of The Indian Express noted, "Jab We Met has gained cult status in the world of Hindi romantic comedies and can easily be addressed as the most adored love story since Dilwale Dulhania Le Jayenge (1995)." Jab We Met is cited as a milestone in Imtiaz Ali, Shahid and Kareena's career. The film brought recognition to Kareena Kapoor and Shahid Kapoor, both having enjoyed only limited success in their previous films. The couple was named in Bollywood Hungama's list of the top 10 best romantic couples of the decade. Shahid and Kareena's performance has been noted as one of their most notable works. It later consolidated their career.

Kareena Kapoor's character Geet Dhillon, became a popular and recognizable character. She later went on to say about her role, "To play a character like Geet doesn't happen all the time; it just happens. When you begin working on a film, you of course know about the story and your character. However, no one knows how audiences would eventually react to it. Geet did strike a chord with the audiences and became a household name." Rediff.com named Geet, as one of Bollywood's most beloved characters. For her performance in the film, she was placed 66th in Filmfare's "80 Iconic Bollywood Performances" list. Vogue, Rediff.com, Pinkvilla and Cosmopolitan have named Geet among the strongest and inspirational female characters of Bollywood.

== See also ==
- List of highest-grossing Bollywood films
- List of Hindi films of 2007
