= Luck (2009 film) =

2009 Indian film by Soham Shah

- Theatrical release poster
- Directed by: Soham Shah
- Written by: Soham Shah
- Screenplay by: Rensil D'Silva; Soham Shah
- Produced by: Dhilin Mehta
- Starring: Mithun Chakraborty; Sanjay Dutt; Imran Khan; Ravi Kishan; Shruti Haasan; Danny Denzongpa
- Cinematography: Santosh Thundiyil
- Edited by: Biren Jyoti Mohanty
- Music by: Songs: Salim–Sulaiman; Background Score: Amar Mohile
- Production company: Shree Ashtavinayak Cine Vision
- Distributed by: Indian Films
- Release date: 24 July 2009
- Running time: 141 minutes
- Country: India
- Language: Hindi

Luck is a 2009 Indian Hindi-language action thriller film directed by Soham Shah and produced by Dhilin Mehta under Shree Ashtavinayak Cine Vision Ltd. The film stars Sanjay Dutt, Imran Khan, Mithun Chakraborty, Ravi Kishan, Shruti Haasan and Danny Denzongpa in pivotal roles. The cinematography was handled by Santosh Thundiyil, while the music was composed by Salim–Sulaiman recorded the musical score. Hassan made her feature film debut through this film.

Luck was released on 24 July 2009 to lukewarm response from critics and became a box-office bomb. In September 2024, Shah accused the producers of Squid Game of plagiarizing the film's plot, a claim that was denied by the distributor, Netflix. However, observers had noted that Luck itself combined elements from the French film 13 Tzameti (2005), the Australian-American film The Condemned (2007), and the Spanish film Intacto (2001). In September 2025, the copyright infringement action was dismissed with prejudice, primarily due to Shah not owning the film's copyright (and thus unable to pursue a lawsuit), as well as for the two works being substantially dissimilar.

== Plot ==
Gambling kingpin Karim Musa is a very lucky person. He remained the sole survivor when a mosque collapsed in Maharashtra when he was just nine months old and was amongst very few survivors of another incident at the age of 12. When he was 14, he challenged three friends to jump from a four-storied building and remained alive, though with some injuries, and won. He started gambling at 19 and since then tried out his luck in different places of the world and became known as Musa Bhai. For him, gambling and drug smuggling have become old ways to get money; his latest interest is investment on people's luck.

Ram Mehra is a banker who is abducted by Musa's right-hand man Lakhan Tamang, but instead of taking, he gives Ram hundred thousand rupees and explains that Ram is very lucky as Tamang bought lottery tickets for two years without any success until he took tickets from Ram both of which won him two hundred thousand rupees. He then offers Ram 200 million rupees for which Ram has to gamble with him for 20 days. After Ram agrees, Musa Bhai and Tamang create a game, getting people with luck to play, and the luckiest ones win them money.

Later, along with Ram, Tamang hires Major Jabar Pratap Singh, who is a soldier as lucky once as he fought in battles and faced numerous bullets yet none that could kill him. He is in need of money for the operation of his wife Sheila. Tamang then visits Pakistan where he discovers Shortcut, a 16-year-old girl, who is also known to be lucky as any camel she rides wins the race and observes her winning one despite her camel's half-broken leg. Tamang pays four lakh rupees to "export" her to South Africa. Tamang then invites the sole-criminal, Raghav Raghuvaran to the game. Raghav was put in Tihar Jail for raping many women, and also killing them, but when he was hanged, he survived, and since the Indian law doesn't allow one person to be hanged twice, he is freed from Tihar Jail.

All competitors arrive in Cape Town. There, Ram meets a girl, who is later revealed to be Ayesha and Tamang says she took part in the game once before. In their first game, all competitors shoot the person to their right at the same time with a pistol. Some pistols have a bullet, some don't and all the unlucky ones die, and the lucky ones survive. Later that night, while everyone is eating at a dining table, Ram and Major Jawar Pratap befriend each other and Raghav goes to Ayesha's room, and starts flirting with her, though Ayesha pays no attention and leaves. The second game is where all of the contestants take parachutes and jump off from a helicopter. Some parachutes open while others don't. Among the unlucky is Ayesha whose parachute doesn't open but she is saved by Ram since he has developed a liking towards her, and afterwards, they start getting closer. In the third game, everyone is left in a hollow tank with one of everyone's hand locked with handcuffs and in front of them are 300 keys and one each will open the handcuffs and added to their trouble are the sharks that swim around them as they start opening the handcuffs as the tank sinks. Ram, Ayesha, Raghav and Major Pratap survive but Shortcut is attacked by a shark. The shark bites her leg off, and Ram jumps into the water, and saves the wounded Shortcut (who is then taken to the hospital). Later on, it is revealed that due to her leg, Shortcut will not be taking part in any of the games anymore.

Before the fourth and final game, Raghav tries to rape and kill Ayesha, but the latter is saved by Ram. Ayesha then runs away to Musa and Tamang, where it is revealed that Ayesha is dead and it is Natasha playing, taking Ayesha's character whilst seeking revenge on Musa, for her sister's death. Musa finds out about this and uses her for the final game. In the final game, Ram, on whom the bid is the highest ever, has to save Natasha before the train she's tied to hits an oil tanker while Major Singh will help him, and Raghav will shoot at Ram and the other survivors try to stop Ram. On the train, Ram starts to fight Raghav, but once Raghav is knocked out, Ram goes to save Natasha, but Raghav gets up, then interrupted by Major Singh, who to save Natasha and Ram, jumps onto Raghav. However, Raghav pushes Major Singh down to the back of the train, which later explodes. Raghav then goes to Ram, who is currently untying Natasha's hands, though Raghav attacks Ram from the back, but when the oil tank reaches right in front of the train, Ram and Natasha jump off, and Raghav dies. When Ram and Natasha realise what has happened, before they lose hope, Major Singh is seen on the floor getting up, who explains that he jumped off the train a second before his side of the train exploded. The three survivors are then approached by Musa and Tamang, who claim that they won the game and claim 200 million rupees each.

Ram stakes his reward and challenges Musa to a game where two pistols are dug in coal the train's carrying and one has to find one and shoot the other. Musa finds both but hands one to Ram and both shoot at the same time and hit each other, Ram is shot at the place of his heart and Musa survives as he is hit at his shoulder. Though, it is shown that Ram's heart is at his right side (dextrocardia), very rare for a human, rather than left and he survives and wins back his reward. Later, Shortcut's leg is fixed by a prosthesis, Major Singh saves his wife and maintains his title "Lucky Major Jawar Pratap Singh" and Ram frees him and his mother off the debts and marries Natasha.

== Cast ==
- Mithun Chakraborty as Major Jawar Pratap Singh
- Sanjay Dutt as Karim Musa
- Imran Khan as Ram Mehra
- Shruti Haasan as Ayesha / Natasha
- Danny Denzongpa as Lakhan Tamang
- Ravi Kishan as Raghav Raghuvaran
- Rati Agnihotri as Mrs. Mehra (Ram's Mother)
- Chitrashi Rawat as Shortcut
- Snehal Dabi as Jiten
- Daya Shankar Pandey as Passport Agent
- Roopa Ganguly as Sheila Singh (Major Jawar Pratap Singh's wife)
- Kota Srinivasa Rao as Swami
- Snita Mahey as Angela

== Soundtrack ==
Luck

Studio album by Salim–Sulaiman
- Released: 23 June 2009
- Genre: Feature film soundtrack
- Length: 41:30
- Label: T-Series
- Producer: Salim–Sulaiman

Salim–Sulaiman chronology
8 x 10 Tasveer (2009)	Luck (2009)	Kurbaan (2009)

Professional ratings
Review scores
Source	Rating
Rediff Music Reviews	2.5/5 stars
Bollywood Hungama	2/5 stars

The soundtrack album has nine songs composed by duo Salim–Sulaiman and background score by Amar Mohile. The lyrics are primarily penned by Shabbir Ahmed for eight songs and Anvita Dutt Guptan for Jee Le. The audio of the film released nationwide on 23 June 2009, a month prior to the release. The album, notably features a song sung entirely by Salim-Sulaiman with the film.

=== Track listing ===
Tracklist
No.	Title	Artist(s)	Length
1.	"Luck Aazma"	Sukhwinder Singh	4:37
2.	"Khudaya Ve"	Salim Merchant	5:23
3.	"Jee Le"	Shruti Pathak	4:27
4.	"Luck Aazma"	Clinton Cerejo	5:30
5.	"Laaga Le"	Anushka Manchanda, Robert Bob Omulo	4:14
6.	"Khudaya Ve" (Radio Mix)	Salim Merchant, Sulaiman Merchant	5:19
7.	"Luck Aazma" (Remix)	Sukhwinder Singh, Satya Hinduja	4:08
8.	"Jee Le" (Remix)	Shruti Pathak, Naresh Kamath	4:05
9.	"Khudaya Ve" (Remix)	Salim Merchant	3:42

== Box office ==
In 4 weeks, the film collected ₹325,800,000 (US$3.4 million) in India, meanwhile collecting ₹16,394,500 (US$170,000) in the UK and ₹14,933,300 (US$160,000) in United States.
