= Kaal (2005 film) =

2005 Indian film by Soham Shah

- Theatrical release poster
- Directed by: Soham Shah
- Written by: Soham Shah
- Produced by: Karan Johar; Shah Rukh Khan
- Starring: Ajay Devgn; John Abraham; Vivek Oberoi; Esha Deol; Lara Dutta
- Cinematography: Santosh Thundiyil
- Edited by: Sanjay Sankla
- Music by: Salim–Sulaiman; Anand Raj Anand
- Production companies: Red Chillies Entertainment; Dharma Productions
- Distributed by: Yash Raj Films
- Release date: 29 April 2005
- Running time: 125 minutes
- Country: India
- Language: Hindi
- Box office: ₹28.5 crore

Kaal (transl. The time) is a 2005 Indian Hindi-language supernatural horror film written and directed by Soham Shah. It was jointly produced by Karan Johar and Shah Rukh Khan under their banners Dharma Productions and Red Chillies Entertainment. The film stars Ajay Devgn, John Abraham, Vivek Oberoi, Esha Deol, and Lara Dutta. It was released on 29 April 2005 and was an average success at the box office.

The story focuses on a wildlife expert, his wife, and a group of friends who battle against a mysterious entity in the fictional Orbit National Park (alluding to the world-famous Jim Corbett National Park, Nainital, Uttarakhand) for their lives while being helped by a mysterious tour guide. The film conveys a message on protecting the wildlife of India.

== Plot ==
Two British nationals are killed by a ferocious tiger in Orbit National Park in India. This incident is followed by several other tiger attacks, and many deaths result, prompting National Geographic to send a correspondent, Krish Thapar to the national park and ascertain what really happened. Krish is accompanied by his wife Riya.

A group of youngsters, consisting of Dev Malhotra, his girlfriend Ishika, and his friends Sajid and Vishal, are on a hunting trip in the hopes of sighting and shooting some big prey. Their car breaks down and Bagga, an alcoholic passerby driver, gives them a lift. Bagga's car accidentally hits Krish's car, which also breaks down and is in the middle of the road. The two groups decide to travel together in Bagga's car, leaving a mechanic to repair Krish's car.

Just a few seconds after they set off, the mechanic disappears and they believe that a wild animal just took him away and decide not to risk their lives to look for him.

Bagga finds them a guesthouse to stay which is owned by a man named DS Pandey. Pandey is a guide who agrees to lead them the next day to the core area, where tigers live, for hunting. That very night Pandey disappears and his decapitated body is found in the nearby swamp the next day. Krish starts to get suspicious about the real cause of the recent deaths in the jungle, as he is an animal expert and recognizes that Pandey's death was not the work of a tiger or any other wild animal.

Warned by a forest officer named Bashir Khan, the group decides to leave the jungle. Before they depart, they realize that Sajid has gone missing. Dev assumes that he has gone by himself to the core area for hunting. However, the group decide to leave without Sajid. Soon they find Sajid's decapitated body by a lake. The rest are soon confronted by three tigers on the way. The group is saved by a mysterious man who introduces himself as Kaali Pratap Singh and claims to live in the jungle.

On their continued way out of the jungle, they find the road blocked by rocks due to the landslide caused by rain. Kaali shows up again and agrees to lead them out of the jungle.

Bagga later disappears while repairing his car, raising fear among the rest. Vishal is decapitated shortly thereafter when a window of their car flies and hits him due to an explosion.

The rest of the group members carry on and reach a deserted guesthouse in the evening, outside which there is a well. They all go to sleep after being warned by Kaali not to get close to the well. Riya wakes up thirsty in the night. She decides to get water from the well despite Kaali's warning, and trips on a rope which pulls her into the well, and she drowns.

The remaining group members figure out that Riya is dead and try to pull her body out of the well, while Dev suddenly notices that Kaali does not have a reflection in the well's water. Terrified by this, Dev makes an excuse to send Kaali away by asking him to gather some timbers which can be used to perform Riya's final rites. During this time, he checks all the videos which had been recorded by Vishal and notices that Kaali is not visible in any of them. Dev immediately realizes that the story Kaali told them earlier is true and that Kaali is the tour guide mentioned in the story. Dev shows the videos to Krish and Ishika, proving to them that Kaali is a ghost and is indeed responsible for all the mysterious deaths happening in the jungle. They decide to escape the jungle once and for all. Kaali returns to the well with timbers and upon finding nobody there, he realizes that the trio have run away.

Flashbacks reveal that the villagers did not kill Kaali but instead, took him to the core area where he was brutally thrashed and then thrown in front of a hungry tiger that mauled him to death. The story shifts back to present day where Kaali’s ghost now standing by the well, expresses his immense anger and hatred for tourists who come to the jungle to hunt wild animals and disrupt their well being without any regrets. This is the sole reason why he misleads and kills tourists who come to the jungle.

Krish, Dev and Ishika experience several attempts on their lives on their way out of the jungle, arranged by Kaali but finally manage to reach the road where Bagga and Khan arrive in a jeep and successfully drive them away from the jungle.

Sometime later, Krish who is now fully aware of what caused those mysterious deaths in that jungle, successfully completes his report in which he deems the deaths to be the result of tiger attacks. He reluctantly decides not to disclose the real cause of those deaths because he knows no one will believe him. Instead he credits Kaali as the main contributor to the report. Meanwhile in the jungle, Kaali encounters a new group of tourists and has one of them killed by a truck.

== Cast ==
- Ajay Devgn as Kaali Pratap Singh
- John Abraham as Krish Thapar
- Vivek Oberoi as Dev Malhotra
- Esha Deol as Riya Thapar
- Lara Dutta as Ishika Malhotra
- Vishal Malhotra as Vishal Bhasin
- Kushal Punjabi as Sajid Meer
- Parmeet Sethi as Bashir Khan
- Vineet Sharma as Bagga
- Daya Shankar Pandey as DS Pandey
- Shah Rukh Khan as himself in the song "Kaal Dhamaal" (special appearance)
- Malaika Arora as herself in the song "Kaal Dhamaal" (special appearance)
- DivyangPriteshKumar Patel as himself Kaal Dhamaal (Special Appearance)

== Production ==
Soham Shah had earlier assisted Karan Johar in Kabhi Khushi Kabhie Gham... (2001). The filmmakers used 25 litres of real blood in the film. The idea of using computer-generated tigers was dropped because of the lack of its realism. The three tigers shown in Kaal were also used in the Hollywood film Gladiator (2000). Scenes involving tigers were shot in Bangkok, where they used to roam free on sets. Vivek Oberoi wanted to portray the character Kaali, but later accepted the role he was offered. The film was shot at the Jim Corbett National Park.

== Reception ==
The film received mixed reviews from critics, noting it to be a different type of horror film. Planet Bollywood rated the film 5/10 stars, writing, "Soham Shah is as inept at directing performances as he is at writing an engaging screenplay or building any sort of momentum or pacing visually. Lack of strong characterization tells on the dismal level of performances from the cast. Lara Dutta cringes, cries, and yells randomly, while Esha Deol consistently carries a strange expression on her face that suggests she might have just swallowed a frog. Capable actors, Vivek Oberoi and John Abraham are sadly curtailed by their cardboard characters. Ajay Devgn tries his level best to rise above the non-existent screenplay, but the daunting task of saving the film single-handedly proves too difficult even for him."

== Soundtrack ==
Kaal

Soundtrack album by Salim–Sulaiman
- Released: 28 February 2005
- Genre: Feature film soundtrack
- Label: Sony Music India

The music is composed by Salim–Sulaiman and Anand Raj Anand, with lyrics written by Shabbir Ahmed, Anand Raj Anand, and Kailash Kher. According to the Indian trade website Box Office India, with around 16,00,000 units sold, this film's soundtrack album was the year's seventh highest-selling.

=== Track listing ===
No.	Title	Lyrics	Music	Singer(s)	Length
1.	"Aankhiyan Teriya Ve"	Kailash Kher	Salim–Sulaiman	Kailash Kher, Caralisa Monteiro,	4:09
2.	"Jungle Mix"	Jeanne	Salim–Sulaiman	Vijay Prakash, Caralisa Monteiro, Jeanne	5:04
3.	"Kaal Dhamaal"	Shabbir Ahmed	Salim–Sulaiman	Kunal Ganjawala, Ravi Khote, Caralisa Monteiro, Salim Merchant	4:41
4.	"Kaal Dhamaal (The Tiger Mix)"	Shabbir Ahmed	Salim–Sulaiman	Kunal Ganjawala, Ravi Khote, Caralisa Monteiro, Salim Merchant	4:44
5.	"Nassa Nassa"	Anand Raj Anand	Anand Raaj Anand	Sonu Nigam, Sunidhi Chauhan	5:07
6.	"Tauba Tauba"	Shabbir Ahmed	Salim–Sulaiman	Sonu Nigam, Kunal Ganjawala, Sunidhi Chauhan, Richa Sharma	5:05
7.	"Dharma Mix (Medley Of Superhits Songs From Kuch Kuch Hota Hai, Kabhi Khushi Kabhie Gham & Kal Ho Naa Ho)"	Various	Various	Various	7:26
