= Santosh Thundiyil =

Indian cinematographer

- Born: Changanassery, Kerala, India
- Education: Film and Television Institute of India
- Occupation: Cinematographer
- Website: www.santoshthundiyil.com

Santosh Thundiyil is an Indian cinematographer. He is known for films such as Kuch Kuch Hota Hai (1998), Devadoothan (2000), Krrish (2006), Pinjar (2003), Rowdy Rathore (2012) and Jai Ho (2014).

== Early life and education ==
Santosh grew up in the town of Changanacherry in Kerala. He completed his schooling at Sacred Heart English Medium School and graduated with a degree in chemistry from St. Berchmans College, Changanacherry. In 1994, he earned a postgraduate diploma in cinematography from the Film and Television Institute of India (FTII) in Pune. As a student, he was selected to represent Asia at the second European Seminar for Student Directors of Photography, held at the National Film School in Budapest, Hungary.

== Career ==
Santosh assisted cinematographers Govind Nihlani, Venu and Binod Pradhan. He has a number of commercials and documentary films to his credit. He received further training under renowned cinematographers Billy Williams and Dean Cundey during the European Seminar for Student Directors of Photography. He is a visiting professor at the Indian Institute of Technology, Mumbai (IIT Mumbai) and his alma mater, the Film and Television Institute of India, Pune (FTII, Pune).

== Filmography ==
Year	Title	Language	Notes
1998	Pranayavarnangal	Malayalam	
1998	Kuch Kuch Hota Hai	Hindi	
1999	Hello Brother	Hindi	
2000	Tera Jadoo Chal Gayaa	Hindi	
2000	Devadoothan	Malayalam	
2003	Pinjar	Hindi	
2004	Rok Sako To Rok Lo	Hindi	
2005	Waqt: The Race Against Time	Hindi	
2005	Kaal	Hindi	
2006	Krrish	Hindi	
2006	Palunku	Malayalam	
2008	Aakasha Gopuram	Malayalam	
2008	Tipu Kanan Tipu Kiri	Malay	
2009	Luck	Hindi	
2010	Pyaar Impossible	Hindi	
2010	Tere Bin Laden	Hindi	
2011	Patiala House	Hindi	
2012	Rowdy Rathore	Hindi	
2013	Jayantabhai Ki Luv Story	Hindi	
2014	Jai Ho	Hindi	
2016	Rustom	Hindi	
2018	Welcome to New York	Hindi	
2018	Neerali	Malayalam	
2019	Pengalila	Malayalam	
2019	Setters	Hindi	
2024	Kartam Bhugtam	Hindi	
2025	Hisaab Barabar	Hindi	
2025	The Bhootnii	Hindi	

=== Web series ===
Year	Title	Cinematographer	Language	Notes
2020	The Chargesheet: Innocent or Guilty?	Yes	Hindi	Web series released on ZEE5
2021	Illegal Season 2	Yes	Hindi	Web series released on Voot

== Awards and nominations ==
Screen Awards

- 2005 - Best Cinematographer Award - Pinjar

Asianet Film Awards

- 2006 - Best Cinematographer Award - Palunku
- 2008 - Best Cinematographer Award - Aakasha Gopuram

Filmfare Award

- 2012 - Filmfare Award for Best Cinematographer - Rowdy Rathore Nomination
