= Kidnap (2008 film) =

2008 Indian film by Sanjay Gadhvi

- Theatrical release poster
- Directed by: Sanjay Gadhvi
- Screenplay by: Shibani Bathija
- Dialogues by: Sanjay Gadhvi
- Produced by: Dhilin Mehta
- Starring: Sanjay Dutt; Imran Khan; Minissha Lamba; Vidya Malvade
- Cinematography: Bobby Singh
- Edited by: Rameshwar S. Bhagat
- Music by: Songs: Pritam; Guest Composers: Sandeep–Sanjeev; Score: Raju Singh
- Production company: Shree Ashtavinayak Cine Vision
- Distributed by: Indian Films
- Release date: 2 October 2008
- Running time: 163 minutes
- Country: India
- Language: Hindi
- Budget: ₹310 million
- Box office: ₹356 million

Kidnap is a 2008 Indian Hindi-language action thriller film directed by Sanjay Gadhvi and produced by Dhlin Mehta. The film stars Sanjay Dutt, Imran Khan, Minissha Lamba and Vidya Malvade.

The film was released theatrically on 2 October 2008, coinciding with Gandhi Jayanti.

== Plot ==
Sonia Raina is a spirited teenager living with her mother, Mallika, and grandmother, Jaya, following her parents' divorce when she was 10. Shortly before her 18th birthday, Sonia has a heated argument with her mother about curfews after a Christmas party and asks about her father. In frustration, she swims far out to sea, where she is abducted by a man who chloroforms her and takes her to a secluded cottage with no exit.

The next morning, Sonia’s mother receives a call from the abductor, who reveals he wants to speak only to Sonia’s estranged father, Vikrant Raina, a ruthless, New York-based billionaire worth $51.7 billion. He returns to India because he believes someone has emptied a large share of his money and reunites with Mallika, who informs him about the abduction of Sonia and the abductor’s demand. The kidnapper reveals that Vikrant's money is safe in his account but insists he complete a series of dangerous tasks to learn the motive behind the kidnapping and secure Sonia's release.

The first task involves apologizing to Sister Margaret, a woman from Vikrant’s past, whom he must locate on a train. With the help of detective Irfan, Vikrant uncovers a poem given by the woman. Meanwhile, Sonia, initially defiant, becomes conflicted as she discovers her captor is not inherently cruel. Despite attempting to escape by injuring him, she later realizes his anger stems from years of pent-up frustration.

Sonia eventually realizes the bungalow she is held captive in was once owned by Vikrant, and this captor who she had misunderstood is actually someone she knows. Years ago, Sonia suffered a car accident involving her and a young boy who was stealing the car; in reality, he was desperate to use it to save his injured friend. Vikrant’s influence sent the young boy to prison, where he endured 15 years of abuse and humiliation, fostering a desire for revenge. His intent was to teach Vikrant a lesson, not harm Sonia, though Sonia begins to empathize with him as she uncovers the truth.

Meanwhile, based on the clues he already has, Vikrant figures out that his daughter's kidnapper is actually Kabir Devendra Sharma, who he realizes he had wrongly framed for "intentionally" hurting Sonia. Meanwhile, unable to reach Vikrant over the phone, Kabir decides to pay him a visit. As planned, Vikrant and Irfan intercept him and a chase ensues. Eventually, Kabir leads Vikrant to Sonia. After meeting Sonia briefly, Vikrant is told to dismiss Irfan from the case and he hands Vikrant the task to free a prisoner from jail. Vikrant follows the command and succeeds in saving the prisoner who, it turns out, is Kabir's friend who he wanted to save, but shortly after the assignment, Irfan intervenes and shoots Kabir, who has already bidden farewell to his friend. Angered, Vikrant threatens Irfan to stay away from now on.

Injured but alive, Kabir escapes and returns to the bungalow, where Sonia nurses him back to health. Despite having an opportunity to escape, Sonia has a fit of guilt and stays back as she feels he has been gravely wounded. Based on the clue Vikrant receives after freeing the prisoner from jail, he figures out Sonia's location. On reaching his old bungalow, he does not find Sonia or Kabir but instead discovers the next clue that requires Vikrant to murder someone at a New Year's Eve party. After much deliberation Vikrant commits the murder and realizes that he murdered Kabir. However, Kabir reveals himself to be alive and confronts Vikrant, forcing him to realize that Vikrant is a criminal himself even though he committed the crimes to rescue Sonia and question whether Kabir was a criminal who deserved imprisonment or a teenager who was unduly penalized for an innocent mistake. Moved by this reckoning, Vikrant apologizes to Kabir, who then vanishes, leaving behind a clue that leads Vikrant to Sonia. The family is eventually reunited.

At a family gathering, Kabir reappears to apologize to Sonia for the ordeal he caused. He reveals that he has started anew, working at a software company. Sonia and Kabir part ways amicably, wishing each other well.

== Cast ==
- Sanjay Dutt as Vikrant Raina, Mallika's husband and Sonia's father
- Imran Khan as Kabir Devendra Sharma, Sonia's kidnapper
- Minissha Lamba as Sonia "Soni" Raina, Vikrant and Mallika's daughter
- Rahul Dev as Inspector Irfan, A police officer assigned to the kidnapping case
- Vidya Malvade as Mallika Raina, Vikrant's wife and Sonia's mother
- Sheela David as Sister Margaret, the ex-headmistress of the orphanage where Kabir lived
- Rushita Pandaya as Junior Sonia Raina
- Reema Lagoo as Jaya, Sonia's maternal grandmother
- Raj Zutshi as Mahesh Verma, Vikrant's business rival
- Sophie Choudry in a special appearance in the item number Meri Ek Ada Shola
- Ankita Makwana as Tisha, Sonia's friend

== Soundtrack ==
The music was composed by Pritam and Sandeep–Sanjeev. Mayur Puri wrote the lyrics for all the songs apart from "Mit Jaaye", which was written by Sandeep Vyas.

Kidnap

Soundtrack album by Pritam
- Released: 2008
- Genre: Film soundtrack
- Label: Sony BMG
- Producer: Pritam

Pritam chronology
Singh Is Kinng (2008)	Kidnap (2008)	Golmaal Returns (2008)

Track	Singer(s)	Lyrics	Duration
"Haan Ji"	Adnan Sami	Mayur Puri	4:06
"Hey Ya"	Suzanne D'Mello	Mayur Puri	4:15
"Hey Ya" (House Mix)	Suzanne D'Mello	Mayur Puri	4:09
"Mausam"	Shreya Ghoshal	Mayur Puri	4:27
"Meri Ek Ada Shola"	Sukhwinder Singh, Sunidhi Chauhan & Akriti Kakar	Mayur Puri	5:18
"Mit Jaaye"	Sandeep Vyas	Sandeep Vyas	4:00
"Mit Jaaye" (Rock Version)	Sandeep Vyas	Sandeep Vyas	4:18

== Reception ==
=== Box office ===
The film grossed ₹356 million at the box-office.

=== Critical reception ===
Kidnap received generally negative reviews from critics. Elvis D'Silva of Rediff.com gave 2 stars out of 5, criticising the performances of Sanjay Dutt and Minissha Lamba. Gaurav Malani of Indiatimes Movies gave 2.5 stars, praising the storyline and climax. Taran Adarsh gave the film 2 out of 5, criticising the script as one "that easily ranks amongst the worst of 2008" while praising the performance of Imran Khan.
