= Amrapali (TV series) =

Indian Television Series (2002)

Amrapali was an Indian historical drama TV serial, directed by Ravi Kemmu in 2002. It was a big-budget (Rs 100 million) story depicting the world of around 600 B.C. The serial was broadcast on the Doordarshan National Network every Sunday at 11am, starting on 30 June 2002.

The story's central character was a young woman, Amrapali, who was made the property of the state and elevated to a high position but forced into entertaining men. Kemmu said at a press meeting that very little information is available about Amrapali, and her history is only known through the Jataka tales.

Amrapali was originally conceptualised as a serial of 104 parts. It called for a cast of 39 supported by a 500-strong crowd, 25 horses, several elephants, and 25 security personnel to guard a set that cost Rs 40 million.

== Personnel ==
The lead role of Amrapali was played by Shilpa Shinde. Her name was recommended by her brother, who was working with Shree Ashtavinayak Cine Vision Ltd. Shilpa Shinde opted out of the show in October 2002 due to remuneration differences with the producer, after shooting 22 episodes of the serial. She was then replaced by Pooja Bharti.

The serial was made by DVR Films, presented by L.R. Enterprises, researched by Bodhi Satva, written by B.M. Vyas, and produced by Dhillin Mehta and D. Venkateshwar Rao. Before the serial went on air, the originally nominated director Vijay Pande was replaced with Ravi Kemmu.

== Cast ==
- Shilpa Shinde/ Pooja Bharti as Amrapali.
- Seema Kar
- Benjamin Gilani as Mahanaman, Amrapali's foster father
- Narendra Jha as Harsh (Amrapali's childhood love)
- Kanika Shivpuri
- Neelima Azeem
- Arun Bali
- Pankaj Berry as Bimbisara
- Rajesh Puri
- Vishnu Sharma
- Zaheeda
- Manish Wadhwa as Ajatashatru
- Shahbaaz Khan

== Plot ==
Amrapali is set in ancient Vaishali. It tells the story of the sudden transformation of a beautiful, innocent girl, Amrapali, into a mature adult. Abandoned by her parents, Amrapali was found as an infant under a mango tree by Mahanaman. He took her to a village on the outskirts of Vaishali, where she grew up and fell in love with a man named Harsh.

Out of curiosity, she visits Vaishali to see the Phalguni Utsav organised every seven years to crown the new Janpath Kalyani of Vaishali. This title is given every seven years to the most beautiful and talented woman of the kingdom, who will then entertain the men of her choice.

Amrapali's visit to the utsav changes the course of her life. In a dramatic turn of events, she gets drunk and joins the group of beauties contending to become Janpath Kalyani. Later she works for the uplift of women and wages a battle to end the practice of Janpath Kalyani. In the process, she loses her beloved as well as her freedom, and embraces Buddhism.

== Awards ==
The serial Amrapali won Indian Television Academy Awards in 2002 in several categories.

- Best Mythological/Historical Serial - D.Venkateshwar Rao / Dhilin Mehta
- Best Art Direction - Jayant Deshmukh
- Best Costumes- Mala Dey
- Best Cinematography / Videography - Mahesh Talkad

== See also ==
- Buddha (television series)
