= Bhagam Bhag =

2006 Indian film by Priyadarshan

- Theatrical release poster
- Directed by: Priyadarshan
- Written by: Neeraj Vora
- Story by: Neeraj Vora; Priyadarshan
- Based on: Mannar Mathai Speaking by Siddique–Lal
- Produced by: Sunil Shetty; Dhilin Mehta
- Starring: Akshay Kumar; Govinda; Paresh Rawal; Jackie Shroff; Arbaaz Khan; Lara Dutta; Rajpal Yadav; Shakti Kapoor; Asrani
- Cinematography: Jeeva
- Edited by: Arun Kumar; N. Gopalakrishnan
- Music by: Songs: Pritam Chakraborty; Background Score: Salim-Sulaiman
- Production companies: Shree Ashtavinayak Cine Vision; Popcorn Motion Pictures
- Distributed by: Shemaroo Entertainment; Shree Ashtavinayak Cine Vision
- Release date: 22 December 2006
- Running time: 159 minutes
- Country: India
- Language: Hindi
- Budget: ₹32 crore
- Box office: ₹67.82 crore

Bhagam Bhag (transl. Mad rush) is a 2006 Indian Hindi-language comedy thriller film directed by Priyadarshan and written by Neeraj Vora. It was produced by Sunil Shetty and Dhilin Mehta. The film stars Akshay Kumar, Govinda and Paresh Rawal as the three leads alongside Lara Dutta, Rajpal Yadav, Jackie Shroff, Arbaaz Khan, Shakti Kapoor, Manoj Joshi, Razak Khan and Asrani. The film tells the story of a theatre group which travels to London for a show and need a heroine to complete their play, only to be entangled in a murder mystery they did not commit, as well as mistakenly becoming the enemies of a drug cartel and a street gang, in the process.

The film adapted certain subplots of the Malayalam film Mannar Mathai Speaking which itself was based on the 1958 film Vertigo. The film was remade in Telugu as Brahmanandam Drama Company (2008).

The film was released theatrically on 22 December 2006, during Christmas holidays and received mixed reviews from critics but was a commercial success and became the 9th highest-grossing film of the year. Over the years after release, it has become a cult classic due to its humour.

== Plot ==
Champak Chaturvedi runs a theatrical troupe in India. His two men, Bunty and Babla, are assigned to either play the role of their play's hero, or the villain. Both men end up squabbling with each other, as both want the hero's part. Champak finds out that Bunty has harassed the play's heroine, Anjali, and punishes him. The group gets a contract to stage 30 plays in Britain by producer Ravindra Taneja; however, on the day of the departure, Anjali opts out, leaving Champak no alternative but to travel without a heroine, hoping to recruit one while in Britain. Upon arrival in London, Champak declares that whoever brings him a heroine will be given the role of the main hero.

Babla sets about to find a suitable "heroine" from the Indian population. On the advice of Gullu, a cab driver who misinterprets the request, he goes to a garden where he is followed by Bunty, and the two agree to take the turns in the role of the hero. While there, Bunty and Babla have their suitcase accidentally switched by two men with one containing "heroin", and as a result, both men end up being considered suspects by the local police, whose commissioner is J. D. Mehra. The two men who switched the suitcase are revealed to be working under Manubhai Gandhi, a builder and drug smuggler who is trying to sell drugs to his buyer, dreaded gangster Sher Khan. He and his men immediately suspect the trio to be secret police after hearing from Sher Khan that his men had been arrested by the police, and comedy ensues whenever Gandhi and his men bump into them. Gullu takes Bunty to two goons, Guru and Hakka, who know a woman who lives in Germany, but they insist to drive there with the two along with all of their men. Not wanting to go along with this condition, the two trick all the goons into exiting the car while they escape, though Guru is still inside the car.

Bunty eventually recruits a woman named "Munni" who suffers from suicidal tendencies, after she attempts to commit suicide in front of their car, with Guru falling out and breaking his leg in the process. Guru and his men find the troupe and chase Bunty to get their revenge, but Bunty escapes, and Hakka accidentally breaks Guru's other leg instead. Munni is accepted as the heroine of the play, and through the course of time, Bunty falls in love with "Munni", but before he can propose to her, she suffers a car accident and loses her memory, claiming to be Nisha, and calling for her husband. Nisha's husband, Vikram Chauhan, soon arrives, thanks everyone, and takes his wife back home to Liverpool. A few days later, an initially heartbroken Bunty receives a phone call from a frantic Nisha, who tells him to come over immediately. He, along with Champak and Babla, arrive there to find her body in flames.

Later, Bunty briefly sees Nisha on the streets, but no one believes him. The group ultimately decide to enact a play in which there is no need for a heroine. On the night of the play, a frightened Champak also sees Nisha in the restroom. Suddenly, Vikram bumps into the trio with a gun in his hand, and Bunty accidentally presses the trigger of the gun, killing him. They hide Vikram's body and Champak's bloodstained kurta in an AC duct to avoid any suspicion. They go on to perform the play, but Vikram's body slides down the vents and falls onto the stage. Mehra, who was present in the audience, investigates the case and finds Champak's kurta and Babla's chain on Vikram's body and has the trio arrested. While the trio is being taken, Gandhi's men throw a grenade in the police car in an attempt to kill them, compelling them to escape.

Bunty suggests that they find Nisha to prove their innocence. After breaking into her house, they find out that Nisha has booked a ticket to Mumbai under the name of Aditi Desai. They call at the number she registered for booking and find out that another girl named Sheetal, who is a friend of Nisha, has brought the ticket for her. Champak accidentally allows himself to get kidnapped by Gandhi's men, and they torture him to get the information that they suspect he knows about their drug smuggling business. Meanwhile, Guru and his men take Gullu's taxi, and won't return it until Gullu brings Bunty to them; he is then captured by his boss, the taxi's owner, who threatens he will imprison Gullu if he doesn't retrieve the taxi. Babla and Bunty follow Sheetal to a train station, where they witness her handing the ticket to Nisha. Bunty catches her and chases her to the top of a clocktower, while Babla calls Mehra about their location. Gullu witnesses this and calls Guru to take Bunty and return the taxi, and the taxi owner to take the taxi back. Gandhi also chooses the clocktower as his destination to complete his deal with Khan and asks him to come there.

Nisha reveals to Bunty and Babla that her actual name is Aditi Desai, and she was hired by Vikram Chauhan to act as his real wife, Nisha Chauhan, for sometime, and make everyone believe she had suicidal tendencies in exchange for 25 lakh and a ticket back to India, as she was stranded without her passport after escaping her exploitative host. But when her work was done, she witnessed Vikram killing the real Nisha to extort money from her, and tried to save Nisha but failed to do so; it was the real Nisha who got burnt and died. On the play night, Aditi had come to tell the truth to Bunty and the others, but she was seen by Vikram, who was also there and wanted to kill Aditi for being the only witness in his wife's murder. However, Mehra, in a shocking turn of events, appeared and shot him; he was already wounded when he encountered the trio. Mehra then arrives and tells his side of the story—that he killed Vikram to avenge Nisha, who he reveals was his sister; Vikram drugged her in order to gain control of her wealth.

Mehra tries to kill Aditi for helping Vikram and being the only witness in his murder, but Gandhi, Khan, and their men (with Champak as their prisoner), Guru and his men (who have kidnapped Taneja as they believe he is Bunty's boss who told him to deceive them), Gullu, and the taxi owner and his men simultaneously arrive, and the convergence causes chaos. In the confusion, Gandhi, who believes everyone present is undercover police, accidentally shoots a hive of bees, who attack and chase everyone (apart from Mehra, who escapes) outside onto the clock on the top floor. A fire brigade team tries to rescue them, but the mechanical ladder malfunctions from their combined weight and begins to fall apart, sending everyone flying off the ladder and getting injured (except Aditi) as they fall and land in different places. All of them are admitted to the hospital, where Mehra visits Champak's team and Aditi, returns their passports, and surrenders himself to the police.

== Cast ==
- Govinda as Babla
- Akshay Kumar as Bunty
- Paresh Rawal as Champak Chaturvedi a.k.a. "Sethji"
- Lara Dutta as Aditi Desai a.k.a. "Munni"
- Arbaaz Khan as Vikram Chauhan, Nisha's husband
- Sharat Saxena as Fredrick
- Asrani as Ravinder Taneja
- Manoj Joshi as Manubhai "M. G." Gandhi
- Rajpal Yadav as Gulab Singh Lakhan Singh Haryanewaale aka Gullu
- Jackie Shroff as J. D. Mehra, London Police Commissioner.
- Shakti Kapoor as Guru
- Razak Khan as Hakka
- Amita Nangia as Vaijanti
- Gurleen Chopra as Nisha Mehra Chauhan (special appearance)
- Tanushree Dutta as Anjali Singh (cameo appearance)
- Prerna Arora as Sheetal, Aditi's friend

== Production ==
Shooting took place in Oxford, United Kingdom in July–August 2006, filming at several University of Oxford landmarks. The film borrows core plot from the Malayalam film Mannar Mathai Speaking with certain comedy sub-plot borrowed from Nadodikattu..The plot twist in the climax was borrowed from the 1999 Marathi thriller Bindhaast which Priyadarshan had earlier remade in Tamil as Snegithiye and Malayalam as Raakilipattu.

== Soundtrack ==
Bhagam Bhag

Soundtrack album by Pritam Chakraborty
- Released: 18 November 2006
- Length: 60:05
- Label: T-Series
- Producer: Pritam Chakraborty

Pritam Chakraborty chronology
Dhoom 2 (2006)	Bhagam Bhag (2006)	Hattrick (2007)

All lyrics are written by Sameer; all music is composed by Pritam Chakraborty.

No.	Title	Singer(s)	Length
1.	"Tere Bin"	Kunal Ganjawala, Sunidhi Chauhan	5:40
2.	"Signal"	Remo Fernandes, Suzanne D'Mello	5:00
3.	"Bhagam Bhag"	Neeraj Shridhar	4:39
4.	"Afreen"	KK, Sunidhi Chauhan	6:06
5.	"Signal" (Remix)	Remo Fernandes, Suzanne D'Mello	4:56
6.	"Tere Bin" (Remix)	Kunal Ganjawala, Sunidhi Chauhan	4:44
7.	"Afreen" (Remix)	KK, Sunidhi Chauhan	4:47
8.	"Bhagam Bhag" (Press Play Mix)	Neeraj Shridhar	4:37
9.	"Tere Bin" (Reprised)	Kunal Ganjawala, Shreya Ghoshal	5:46
10.	"Bhagam Bhag" (Ragga Mix)	Neeraj Shridhar	5:01
11.	"Chal Ud Chalein" (Run Run)	Jojo, Suhail Kaul	4:42
Total length:			60:05

Note: the Soundtrack also contains "Aa Khushi Se Khud Kushi Kar Le", which is the Solo Version Sung by Sunidhi Chauhan, which was not used in the movie, it was remade later with Shaan and included in the 2007 film "Darling". The background music for "Afreen" samples "Heaven on Their Minds" from the Andrew Lloyd Webber and Tim Rice musical, Jesus Christ Superstar. The music for "Signal" samples "Signal for Lara" by Super Blue.

== Release ==
The film was worldwide released on 22 December 2006.

== Reception ==
The Times of India gave the film 3 out of 5 stars and stated, "The actors try hard, but the script and the dialogues let them down. Even the situations aren't funny enough, except for a few. Case in point, watch Paresh trying to chew a grenade and Govinda asking for a bite too. Funny!" Taran Adarsh of Bollywood Hungama gave the film 3 out of 5 stars and stated, "Bhagam Bhag will be loved for its comedy in the first hour, but the whodunit in the second hour tapers the impact."

Gullu Singh of Rediff.com gave the film 2 out of 5 stars and stated, "The real hero of the film is Kumar. He outshines everyone and has some of the best dialogues in the film. He is a treat to watch." Indu Mirani of DNA India gave the film 0.5 out of 5 stars and stated, "Ever since Priyadarshan made Hera Pheri in 2000, he has been continually repeating the formula. When he doesn't do so, as with Kyon Ki (2005), he fails miserably."

== Sequel ==
In November 2024, it was reported that Akshay Kumar had acquired the rights to Bhagam Bhag from Shemaroo and is working on the development of Bhagam Bhag 2.

== See also ==
- Remakes of films by Alfred Hitchcock
