= Bina Kak =

Indian politician

Personal details
- Born: Bharatpur, Rajasthan
- Party: Indian National Congress
- Spouse: Bharat Kak (Divorced)
- Children: 2

Bina Kak is an Indian politician and Bollywood actress.

== Early life ==
Kak was born as Beena Bhasin, one of the six children of Dr. M.R. Bhasin, a government doctor. She has three brothers and two sisters. Her brothers are Dr. B.B. Bhasin, a doctor based in the UK, B.B. Bhasin, a retired IPS officer, and Late Col. Indra Bhushan who died in 2004. Her sisters are Kusum Suri, a retired school teacher based in the United States, and Kamla Bhasin, a writer and feminist activist.

Kak graduated from Home Science College, Udaipur in 1978, and then took a Master's degree from The Maharaja Sayajirao University of Baroda. She then married Bharat Kak. He belonged to a Kashmiri family from Jodhpur that had received jaagir from the Jodhpur and Udaipur royal families. The family had migrated from Kashmir 300 years ago. It was an arranged marriage, initiated by her brother.

== Political career ==
Kak's former husband, Bharat Kak, belongs to a Kashmiri Pandit family settled in Rajasthan. His family, which hails originally from Kashmir, has lived in Rani, Rajasthan (in Pali district) for more than two centuries and has long-standing connections to the Nehru family, which was another Kashmiri Pandit family settled in Rajasthan: the Nehrus had lived in Khetri, Rajasthan, before Motilal Nehru moved to Allahabad in the late 1800s in order to practice law at the Allahabad High Court. After marrying Bharat Kak, Beena Kak entered politics in the early 1980s as a member of the Congress Party. In 1985, as part of Rajiv Gandhi's much-touted efforts to bring 'new blood' into politics and into the Congress party, Bina, educated in government schools who had spent her childhood in small villages of Kota district began at the grassroots level as a Congress worker. At the same time lending her mother-in-law, a hand in farming. To her goes the credit of being the first women entrepreneur who rose to be the (president of Youth Congress in Pali). She then became the Mahila Congress President of the district. Her work was noticed by the state leadership, mainly Vishnu Modi, and Gauri Punia. She also vigorously campaigned for Moolchand in 1983.

In 1985, Bina Kak was elected to the Rajasthan Legislative Assembly from the Sumerpur (Rajasthan Assembly constituency) and served as an MLA up to 1990. In 1990 she lost by a mere 274 votes. But many experts are of the opinion that had she been allowed a recounting, she might have won. Bina Kak was reelected as a MLA in 1993 and again in 1998 from the Sumerpur constituency. She lost the election in 2003 only to make a comeback in 2008. In 2013, she lost her seat to the BJP.

Bina Kak served for a long period as Cabinet Minister in the Government of Rajasthan, holding at various times the portfolios of Woman & Child Development, Tourism, Art & Culture, Archeology and Printing & Stationery. She was also the Minister of State for Tourism and Cultural Affairs of Rajasthan from 1998 to 2003. She was also the forest minister during the last Congress government up to 2013.

== Film career ==
Kak is close to superstar Salman Khan's family. Their brother-sister relationship far transcends the fallout of the court cases pending in the Jodhpur and Pali district courts against the actor for illegal hunting of endangered wild animals in 1998. After losing the assembly elections of 2003, her never say die spirit saw Kak take to acting, a long-held interest. Salman offered her a role in his 2005 film Maine Pyaar Kyun Kiya?, which was produced by Salman's brother Sohail Khan and directed by David Dhawan. In her Bollywood debut, Kak acted as the hot-headed mother of the hero Samir, played by Salman Khan. In 2008, she again appeared as Khan's mother in God Tussi Great Ho, which once again was produced by Sohail Khan. She has acted in few other films such as, Nanhe Jaisalmer, Dulha Mil Gaya, and Salaam-e-Ishq: A Tribute To Love and Jaanisar.

== Personal life ==
Bina Kak married Bharat Kak in the early 1980s. The couple has two children: a son, Ankur Kak, and a daughter, Amrita Jhunjhunwala. Ankur, the older of the two, is a trained chef and currently into real estate development in Jaipur, the capital of Rajasthan. In 2009, he married Milan Rai, with whom he shares many interests.

Kak's daughter, Amrita Jhunjhunwala, is a singer who has recorded several songs for Hindi films, most of them for films produced by or featuring Salman Khan and his family. These include the songs "Just Chill" (Maine Pyaar Kyun Kiya?), "Tujhe Aksa Beach" (God Tussi Great Ho), "Love Me Love Me" (Wanted), "Character Dheela" (Ready) and "Dhinka chika" (Ready), and "ummeed" (Dangerous Ishhq). On 29 May 2010, Amrita married Riju Jhunjhunwala, scion of a rich Marwadi business family and Managing Director of Rajasthan Spinning & Weaving Mills Ltd., which is owned by his family. In October 2012, the couple welcomed a boy.

Bina Kak and her husband, Bharat Kak, were estranged for many years and finally divorced. Bina courted controversy in her marital life which was laid to rest by divorce with mutual consent.

== Social activist ==
Bina's "Umang" to reach out to the weak and needy was realized when she founded Umang, a center for children with special needs. Umang is an initiative that strives for an inclusive society that provides equal opportunity for all, by enhancing the quality of life of individuals with various disabilities. Umang reaches out to persons with cerebral palsy, autism, mental challenges and multiple disabilities.

== Environmentalist and writer ==
A keen environmentalist, Bina Kak as forest minister in 2011 was instrumental in converting Kumbhalgarh sanctuary into a national park. In 2013, Bina played a key role in getting Mukandara Hills notified as third tiger reserve after Ranthambore and Sariska.

Bina Kak recently published a book namely Silent Sentinels of Ranthambore, an outcome of her passion for Nature and love of the wild and its small and big creatures.
