= Soham Shah =

Bollywood movie director

Soham Shah is an Indian film director who is known for directing the films Kaal (2005) and Luck (2009).

== Personal life ==
Shah is from Mumbai.

== Career ==
Shah previously worked for Dharma Productions and producer Karan Johar but they have recently split ways. He is now working for Kumar Mangat. He has also expressed an interest in directing Gujarati films.

== Filmography ==
Year	Title	Director	Dialogues	Notes
2005	Kaal	Yes	Yes	
2009	Luck	Yes	Yes	
2019	Fixerr	Yes		Web series released on ALTBalaji and ZEE5
2024	Kartam Bhugtam	Yes	Yes	
