= Dhilin Mehta =

Indian film producer (Born: 1974)

- Born: 14 March 1974 (age 51); Mumbai, Maharashtra, India
- Years active: 1998–2014

Dhilin Mehta is an Indian film producer. He served as the chief executive officer of Ashtavinayak Cine Vision. He produced the DD1 serial Aamrapali in 2002. He started his career with small budget films like Fun2shh and Agnipankh and then led Ashtavinayak to bigger budgets and blockbusters. Since Ashtavinayak was suspended from trading in 2012, Mehta was arrested by the Rajasthan Police at the international airport in Mumbai in January 2013, just hours before he was scheduled to board a flight to Dubai. He was granted bail on the same day.

== Filmography ==
=== Producer ===
- Bol Bachchan (2012)
- Rockstar (2011)
- Golmaal 3 (2010)
- Dabangg (2010)
- Khatta Meetha (2010)
- Blue (2009)
- Luck (2009)
- Maharathi (2008)
- Golmaal Returns (2008)
- Kidnap (2008)
- Superstar (2008)
- Jab We Met (2007)
- Bhagam Bhag (2006)
- Golmaal (2006)
- Maine Pyaar Kyun Kiya? (2005)
- Agnipankh (2004)
- Fun2shh... Dudes in the 10th Century (2003)
- Shararat (2002)
