= Kidnapping in the United Kingdom =

Statistics for kidnapping in the United Kingdom are often hard to discover, due to the country's policies around the crime.

== Studies ==
Notably, The U.K. has special categorization for the crime of child abduction, it is categorized under the violence against the person, in place of kidnapping. According to the Offender Management Caseload Statistics, The U.K. had recorded about 57 convicted kidnappings cases between 2007 and 2008. In 2008–2009, it was 21. The Caseload Statistics further notes that out of 98,820 prisoners in England and Wales, 217 were convicted of kidnapping. Of these 217 kidnappers, 208 were men, and 9 were women. Other analysis speaks about the criminal histories, using the official records as the source. About 7042 males and 545 females had been jailed for their convicted kidnapping between 1979 and 2001. Only 10 men and 14 women had been sentenced for more than 1 convicted kidnapping. The average age of kidnappers is around mid 20s, and more than half of the men, and one-third of the women kidnappers had been convicted of other offenses, usually thieving and violence.

== Prevalence ==
A 2004 Home Office research study presented 798 police reports regarding child abduction in England and Wales. Of those reports, that 56% (447) involved a stranger, about 375 were attempted abductions while 72 were successful.

The kidnapping figures published by the Office for National Statistics recorded about 532 cases of child abductions that were reported to police in 2011/12. Figures do not include Scotland.

An estimated 500 cases of parental kidnapping are reported in the country, every year.

== Notable incidents ==
Date	Victim(s)	Abductor(s)	Location	Age of victim(s)	Outcome	Notes
14 January 1975	Lesley Whittle	Donald Neilson	Highley, England	17	Murdered	Whittle was an heiress kidnapped from her home by Neilson, also known as the "Black Panther". Whittle's body was later found on 7 March 1975 hanging from a wire in a drain shaft in Bathpool Park, Staffordshire. Nielson was captured and convicted, and died in December 2011 while serving life in prison.
12 February 1993	James Bulger	Robert Thompson and Jon Venables	Merseyside, England	2	Murdered	Bulger was abducted from a Merseyside shopping centre by a pair of ten-year-old boys. Later on in the day the two boys tortured Bulger to death and left his body on a train line.
1 July 2000	Sarah Payne	Roy Whiting	West Sussex, England	8	Murdered	Sarah was kidnapped and murdered soon afterwards by Whiting. The subsequent investigation became a high-profile murder case in the United Kingdom. Following his conviction, Whiting was imprisoned for life and is currently being held in the maximum security Wakefield prison, West Yorkshire. The case inspired Sarah's Law, allowing controlled access to the sex offender registry
19 February 2008	Shannon Matthews	Michael Donovan and Karen Matthews	Dewsbury, England	9	Rescued	Shannon was abducted and held captive for 24 days by Donovan, the uncle of her mother, Karen Matthews', boyfriend. After her rescue by police it was found that Karen had helped plot the kidnapping in an attempt to gain reward money, of about £50,000.
3 March 2021	Sarah Everard	Wayne Couzens	South London, England	33	Murdered	Everard was kidnapped in South London by off-duty police officer Wayne Couzens, who falsely arrested her while she was walking home. He later raped, murdered, and burned her body before discarding her remains in a Kent woodland pond. Couzens was later sentenced to life imprisonment and the case led to widespread debate about women's safety and police violence in the UK.

There have been incidents in which kidnapping was faked. In 1992, Joanna Grenside, an aerobics teacher and bulimia sufferer from Harpenden, England, had staged her disappearance to avoid Christmas due to what the magistrates' chairman accepted as being related to her bulimia and the food that would normally go with Christmas.
