= Fun2shh... Dudes in the 10th Century =

2003 film

Fun2shh: Dudes in the 10th Century
- Poster
- Directed by: Imtiaz Punjabi
- Written by: Story and Screenplay: Imtiaz Punjabi; Screenplay and Dialogues: Pravin Rai; Rajesh Khattar
- Produced by: Seema Kar; Dhilin Mehta
- Starring: Gulshan Grover; Paresh Rawal; Farida Jalal; Anuj Sawhney; Iqbal Khan; Raima Sen; Natanya Singh
- Cinematography: Faroukh Fali Mistry
- Edited by: Onir
- Music by: Songs: Pritam; Background Score: Salim–Sulaiman
- Distributed by: Shree Ashtavinayak Cine Vision
- Release date: 19 December 2003
- Running time: 130 minutes
- Country: India
- Language: Hindi
- Box office: ₹4.41 crore

Fun2shh: Dudes in the 10th Century is a 2003 Indian Hindi-language science fiction comedy film written and directed by Imtiaz Punjabi (in his directorial debut) and produced by Seema Kar and Dhilin Mehta under Shree Ashtavinayak Cine Vision Limited, with a script co-written by Pravin Rai and Rajesh Khattar. The film stars Paresh Rawal, Gulshan Grover, Anuj Sawhney, Iqbal Khan, Natanya Singh, Raima Sen and Farida Jalal. The music is composed by Pritam and the background score by Salim–Sulaiman.

== Plot ==
Mumbai lives in fear of Chindi Chor, a notorious thief who steals without regard to security or police protection. When Ghoshal announces the exhibition and subsequent auction of a crown once worn by Emperor Babushah, Chindi challenges him that he is going to steal this priceless crown, and Ghoshal accepts the challenge and hires private security guards. Chindi carries out the theft, and two of the security guards, Vikram and Ajay, and an accomplice, John D'Souza, become prime suspects and flee. They must apprehend Chindi and recover the crown to absolve themselves of this crime. While being chased by security guards, the trio crashes into a wall and is transported back to the 10th century, straight into the palace of Emperor Babushah himself. The trio thinks they are on the set of a Bollywood film and takes nothing seriously until they are imprisoned. The trio realise that they must escape with the crown to the 21st century to absolve themselves of the crime. Only a miracle can return them to the 21st century.

Meanwhile, Vikram and Ajay meet Babu Shah's two daughters, Junali and Rudali, and they fall in love with each other. And the three, along with the princesses, return to the 21st century and along the king's crown. But during their journey, the head of Ajay and Vikram's security agency, who was searching for them, is caught up in the 10th century. When Ajay and Vikram go to return the crown to Ghoshal, they discover that the crown that was stolen from Ghoshal's exhibition was actually a fake and Ghoshal had the thief steal it himself, because Ghoshal had fraudulently insured the crown as the real crown. And if the crown is stolen, he receives the value of the real crown. Vikram and Ajay threaten to tell Ghoshal's secret to the police and leave. Meanwhile, Bhaleram, Ajay and Vikram's security agency chief, along with Emperor Babushah, come to the 21st century with the help of the female magician Hiraka of Babusha's kingdom. And they meet Aju, Vikram, Junali, Rudali, Johni, and Johni's girlfriend Maria. Ghoshal simultaneously arrives with the police. And in this quarrel, it becomes clear that Ghoshal orchestrated the feigned theft to receive an insurance payout. Babushah takes his daughters Rudali and Junali with him to the 10th century. Ghoshal is arrested by the police for fraud. Ajay, Vikram and Johny are acquitted of the theft charge, but Ajay and Vikram's girlfriends are separated from them.

== Cast ==
- Paresh Rawal as John "Johnny" D’Souza
- Iqbal Khan as Vikram "Vikram" Rajput
- Anuj Sawhney as Ajay "Ajay" Sharma
- Gulshan Grover as Chindi Chor / Babushah
- Natanya Singh as the First Princess Junali
- Raima Sen as the Second Princess Rudali
- Farida Jalal as Mrs. Preeti D'Souza / Hiraka
- Rushali Arora as Maria / Shalaka
- Kader Khan as Bhaleram / Goatherd
- Mushtaq Khan as the Bhaleram Assistant
- Kanwarjeet Paintal as Scientist of 10th century
- Narendra Jha as Babushah's Commander
- Ashish Vidyarthi as Ghoshal Roshan
- Bobby Darling as One of Maharaj Babushah's forty wives
- Veerendra Saxena as Inspector Chhatri Pal
- Niloufer as Maharaj Babushah's first wife
- Kavi Kumar Azad as Royal Guard/Goon on Juhu Beach
- Amitabh Bachchan as Narrator

== Music ==
The songs are written by Pravin Rai, Nitin Raikwar and Amitabh Verma.

All music is composed by Pritam.

No.	Title	Singer(s)	Length
1.	"Hold, You Will Be Mine"	K. K., Shaan, Sunidhi Chauhan	4:28
2.	"Dhuan Dhuan Sa Sama, Gila Gila Aasman"	K. S. Chithra (background vocals by Sanjeevani)	4:58
3.	"Fun2shh" (Female Version)	Usha Uthup	5:37
4.	"Fun2shh" (Male Version)	Kunal Ganjawala	5:32
5.	"Hum Hai Fun2shh"	Nitin Raikwar, Vinod Rathod, Kunal Ganjawala	5:09
6.	"Time Kharab Hai"	Sonu Nigam, Hema Malini, Paresh Rawal, Udit Narayan, Amit Behl, Sudesh Bhosle	4:39
Total length:			30:23

== Reception ==
Taran Adarsh of IndiaFM gave the film 1.5 out of 5, writing, "On the whole, FUN2SHH has an interesting first half, but an uninspiring second half takes away the sheen from the enterprise. The film has some curiosity value, but the content [script] does not match the expectations one has from a subject like this. " Jyoti Shukla of Rediff.com wrote, "Fun2shh appears to be a mix of a few episodes of the television serial Chandrakanta, a few Asterix comics and some Bollywood song and dance masala. The result is neither satirical nor comical. Just a test of the viewers' patience."
