= Shree Ashtavinayak Cine Vision =

Defunct Indian film production company

Shree Ashtavinayak Cine Vision Ltd
- Type: Public
- Traded as: BSE: 532793; NSE: SHREEASHTA
- Industry: Motion picture
- Founded: 2001
- Defunct: 2014
- Fate: Suspended From Trading
- Successor: Gandhar Films & Studios
- Headquarters: Mumbai, Maharashtra, India
- Key people: Dhilin Mehta; S.S Jaswal; Hiren Gandhi; Rupen Amlani
- Products: Film production Film distribution

Shree Ashtavinayak Cine Vision was a film production and distribution company that produced and distributed Hindi films. The chief of the company was Dhilin Mehta.

== Television ==
Ashtavinayak Cine Vision produced the serial Amrapali on Doordarshan in 2002.

== Company information ==
The company management includes the following people :-

- Dhilin Mehta - Chairman & Managing Director
- S. S. Jaswal - Director
- Rupen N. Amlani, Dhaval V. Jatania, Hiren J. Gandhi - Full Time Directors
- Ashok V. Ladhani, Chandrakant K. Sachde, Nishant A. Mahidhar, Hetal N. Thakore - Independent Non-Executive Directors

It is listed on the BSE with a BSE Code of 532793 and the NSE with an NSE Code of SHREEASHTA.

Its Registered office is at A-204/205, VIP Plaza, 2nd Floor, Off Andheri Malad Link Road, Mumbai, Maharashtra - 400053.

== Initial years (2003–2004) ==
The company entered Bollywood with Fun2shh... Dudes in the 10th Century (2003), which marked its first of many collaborations with music composers Pritam and duo Salim–Sulaiman, and actor Paresh Rawal. Next, it produced Agnipankh (2004), a film on pilots in the Indian Air Force, where Pritam and Salim–Sulaiman teamed up again to compose the music.

== Early success (2005–2006) ==
The company's first success came with David Dhawan's romantic comedy Maine Pyaar Kyun Kiya (2005), which starred Salman Khan, Sushmita Sen, the film's producer Sohail Khan, Katrina Kaif, Arshad Warsi and Isha Koppikar.

The next year, more prominence came in for the company as it produced the comedies Golmaal: Fun Unlimited (2006) and Bhagam Bhag (2006). While the former marked its first major collaboration with Ajay Devgn as well as director Rohit Shetty, the latter was one of the company's first of many collaborations with Akshay Kumar. Both films featured Rawal in prominent roles.

== Jab We Met (2007) ==
The company produced the romantic comedy-drama Jab We Met, directed by Imtiaz Ali and starring Kareena Kapoor and Shahid Kapoor. It was released on 26 October 2007. The film was nominated for a number of awards, and received the Stardust Award for Best Film in 2008.

== 2008–present ==
In early 2008, the company produced Superstar starring Kunal Khemu. Late into the year, the company saw success with the hit Golmaal Returns, the sequel to Golmaal, whilst also producing Kidnap. At the end of the year, the company released Maharathi starring Boman Irani, Neha Dhupia, Ashwin Nayak, Om Puri, Paresh Rawal, Naseeruddin Shah and Tara Sharma. With the exception of Golmaal Returns, none of the films was successful at the box office.

Blue was Shree Ashtavinayak's biggest project till date with its budget set to INR 100 crores. It was an action film shot in The Bahamas and starring Sanjay Dutt, Akshay Kumar, Lara Dutta and Zayed Khan. However, the film performed poorly at the box office, and got predominantly negative reviews. It also released Luck with a negative result as it earned even less than Kidnap.

Dabangg, Shree Ashtavinayak's most commercial release performed very well at the box office, with its first day collection surpassing that of 3 Idiots, which was distributed by Big Pictures. Dabangg is one of biggest hits of Bollywood. 2010 also earned the company some acclaim and success with the comedies Khatta Meetha and Golmaal 3, which were successful.

Shree Ashtavinayak Cine Vision entered into Joint Venture with LFS Global for creating India's largest film city near Mumbai. In 2011, it produced the cult classic Rockstar, also directed by Ali. As the company faced judicial crisis, it halted operations after producing its final film, the 2012 comedy Bol Bachchan, also directed by Shetty.

However, on 20 June 2014, the company was suspended from trading. Additionally, the Bombay High Court assigned a liquidator after the company failed to pay its creditors. Later, it had to sell the rights of the Golmaal franchise to Shetty, who became a producer in 2014.

Some time later, in 2017–18, when Zee Entertainment Enterprises was rechristened with a new logo, theme and slogans, it syndicated the company's pre-2008 releases, and began broadcasting them on its channels, the only three exceptions being Fun2shh, Agnipankh and Maine Pyaar Kyun Kiya which were readily acquired by Viacom18. Currently three titles, viz. Khatta Meetha, Rockstar and Dabangg lie with Zee, one in Luck lies with Sony Pictures Networks India, and the rest in a mix with JioStar.

== Films produced ==
Year	Film	Other notes
2003	Fun2shh... Dudes in the 10th Century	
2004	Agnipankh	
2005	Maine Pyaar Kyun Kiya	
2005	Paheli	Distribution Only
2005	Tango Charlie	Distribution Only
2006	Tom, Dick, and Harry	Distribution Only
2006	Golmaal - Fun Unlimited	
2006	Bhagam Bhag	
2007	Heyy Babyy	Distribution Only
2007	Jab We Met	
2008	Superstar	
2008	Chakkara Viyugam	Tamil film
2008	Kidnap	
2008	Halla Bol	Distribution only
2008	Golmaal Returns	
2009	Maharathi	
2009	Luck	
2009	Blue	
2010	Khatta Meetha	
2010	Dabangg	National Film Award for Best Popular Film Providing Wholesome EntertainmentFilmfare Award for Best Film
2010	Golmaal 3	
2011	Rockstar	
2012	Bol Bachchan	
