= Amrita Kak =

- Born: Amrita Kak; 19 March 1985 (age 41); Mumbai, India
- Genres: playback singing, Indipop
- Occupation: Singer
- Instrument: Vocalist
- Years active: 2005–2022
- Website: www.instagram.com/amritakak

Amrita Kak is a Bollywood singer who has made music for many Bollywood films. She is the daughter of Indian politician Beena Kak, and married to Business man Riju Jhunjhunwala Actor Salman Khan was responsible for introducing her to the film industry, and due to their closeness, she has been called his rakhi sister. She has also sung most of her songs for his films. She has started her own fashion Brand "Amrita the Label".

== Career ==
She was the singer of the songs "Just Chill" from Maine Pyar Kyun Kiya?, "Character Dheela" from Ready, "Desi Beat" from Bodyguard to name a few. She is also trained in Indian classical music.

== Personal life ==
Amrita's mother is Bina Kak, an Indian Politician. She has a brother, Ankur Kak & a rakhi brother, Indian actor Salman Khan, who is her mentor. Amrita is married to Riju Jhunjhunwala on 29 May 2010.

== Filmography ==
Song	Film	Year released	Language	Additional information
"Just Chill"	Maine Pyar Kyun Kiya?	2005	Hindi	
"Just Chill" (Remix)	Maine Pyar Kyun Kiya?	2005	Hindi	
"Junoon Junoon"	Rocky: The Rebel	2006	Hindi	
"Ankh Vich Chehra Pyaar Da"	Apne	2007	Hindi	
"Ankh Vich Chehra Pyaar Da" (Remix)	Apne	2007	Hindi	
"Tujhe Aksa Beach Ghuma Doon"	God Tussi Great Ho	2008	Hindi	
"Tujhe Aksa Beach Ghuma Doon" (Remix)	God Tussi Great Ho	2008	Hindi	
"Love Me Love Me"	Wanted	2009	Hindi	
"Love Me Love Me"(Mama Papa mix)	Wanted	2009	Hindi	
"Character Dheela"	Ready	2011	Hindi	
"Dhinka Chika"	Ready	2011	Hindi	
"Desi Beat"	Bodyguard	2011	Hindi	
"Desi Beat" (Remix)	Bodyguard	2011	Hindi	
"Desi Beat" (Punjabi Hip-Pop Mix)	Bodyguard	2011	Hindi	
"Umeed"	Dangerous Ishq	2012	Hindi	
"O Ranjhana"	Moods with Melodies	2022	Hindi	
