= Dhamaal (film series) =

Indian film franchise

Dhamaal is an Indian comedy film series directed and co-produced by Indra Kumar. The first four films featured Riteish Deshmukh, Arshad Warsi, Jaaved Jaaferi, Saanand Verma, Karan Deol, Ashish Chaudhary and Sanjay Dutt in lead roles. The third installment also featured Ajay Devgn, Anil Kapoor, Johnny Lever, Boman Irani, Mahesh Manjrekar and Madhuri Dixit along with the original cast, but Dutt and Chaudhary did not appear in the third film. The fourth installment will also feature Ravi Kishan, Sanjeeda Sheikh and Anjali Anand.

The first film, Dhamaal (2007) was released on 7 September 2007. The film spawned three sequels: Double Dhamaal (2011) was released on 24 June 2011, which was a direct sequel to the first film installment; Total Dhamaal (2019) was released on 22 February 2019, and Dhamaal 4, which released on 10 July 2026.

== Overview ==
Film	Release date	Director	Screenwriter(s)	Story	Producer(s)
Dhamaal	7 September 2007	Indra Kumar	Balwinder Singh Suri	Paritosh Painter	Indra Kumar, Ashok Thakeria
Double Dhamaal	24 June 2011	Indra Kumar	Tushar Hiranandani	Tushar Hiranandani	Indra Kumar, Ashok Thakeria
Total Dhamaal	22 February 2019	Indra Kumar	Ved Prakash, Paritosh Painter, Bunty Rathore	Indra Kumar	Ajay Devgn, Ashok Thakeria, Indra Kumar, Markand Adhikari, Anand Pandit
Dhamaal 4	3 July 2026	Indra Kumar	Paritosh Painter; Balvinder Singh Suri; Vedd Prakash; Bunty Rathore	TBA	Ajay Devgn, Bhushan Kumar, Krishan Kumar, Ashok Thakeria, Indra Kumar, Abhishek Pathak, Kumar Mangat Phatak

=== Dhamaal (2007) ===
The first installment of the series centers on fictional incidents. The film stars Sanjay Dutt, Ritesh Deshmukh, Arshad Warsi, Aashish Chaudhary and Javed Jaffrey while Asrani, Sanjay Mishra, Vijay Raaz, Manoj Pahwa, Tiku Talsania and Prem Chopra are featured in supporting roles. It is heavily inspired from the 2001 American comedy film Rat Race directed by Jerry Zucker. Dhamaal was released on 7 September 2007, and gained positive reviews. It earned ₹50.73 crore worldwide The film was declared as a box-office success.

=== Double Dhamaal (2011) ===
After the success of Dhamaal Indra and Sanjay re-united once again for sequel. The film was titled as Dhamaal 2: 420s, but is known as Double Dhamaal or Super Kameenas and also second installment in this series. The plot focused on Four idlers make elaborate plans to earn money by investing in buildings but are conned by Kabir, who leaves them unemployed and penniless. Soon, they are on the prowl to avenge their humiliation. Dhamaal 2 was released on 24 June 2011, and received mixed to negative reviews from critics upon release. Review aggregator Rotten Tomatoes gave it a 20% rotten rating. Mayank Shekhar of the Hindustan Times rated the film with 1 out of 5 stars. According to Box Office India, the film had a good opening of 60 - 70% collections. At a few multiplexes, such as, Spice Noida, E Square Pune and Wave Ludhiana, the film almost opened at a 100% response. The film collected approximately ₹76.1 million net on its first day, according to Box Office India. The movie grossed ₹700 million worldwide. Box Office India finally declared it an "Average". The movie was remade in Tamil in 2000 as Sudhandhiram.

=== Total Dhamaal (2019) ===
A sequel, Total Dhamaal, was commissioned after the release of the previous film and was also directed by Indra, with both Riteish Deshmukh and Jaaved Jaaferi reprising their roles and Ajay Devgn, Anil Kapoor and Madhuri Dixit were new additions in cast playing leading roles. Sanjay Dutt and some other actors which were in the previous two parts were not in this third installment.

The film focused on When a plane carrying a thief's treasure crashes in Janakpur, a group of eccentric people and seasoned con artists compete against each other to find it first. Total Dhamaal was released on 22 February 2019, and gained positive reviews. Himesh Mankad from Koimoi gives 3 star out of 5 says "Total Dhamaal is a fair clean entertainer that can be enjoyed with the entire family. It's definitely an improvement over previous installment Double Dhamaal". In opening week the film grossed ₹150 crore (US$16 million). In 12 days of its release the film crossed ₹200 crore (US$21 million) mark in gross collection. On 20 April 2019, the film was released on Disney+ Hotstar. The DVD was also released in August 2019 by Shemaroo.

=== Dhamaal 4 (2026) ===
After the success of Total Dhamaal, director Indra Kumar announced plans for a fourth instalment in the franchise. The project was officially confirmed in 2024. The film continues the comedy adventure format of its predecessors, retaining several recurring cast members while also introducing new additions.

Pre-production for Dhamaal 4 began in mid-2024 under the direction of Indra Kumar. Principal photography was initially planned to commence in late 2024 but was shifted to early 2025 due to scheduling adjustments for the ensemble cast. In April 2025, filming was announced to take place across multiple locations in India, including Mumbai and Goa, with additional international sequences reportedly planned. Principal photography was wrapped in September the same year.

== Cast and characters ==
Characters Name	Film			
Characters Name	Dhamaal (2007)	Double Dhamaal (2011)	Total Dhamaal (2019)	Dhamaal 4 (2026)
Deshbandhu Roy / Lallan	Riteish Deshmukh	Riteish Deshmukh	Riteish Deshmukh	Riteish Deshmukh
Aditya "Aadi" Shrivastava	Arshad Warsi	Arshad Warsi	Arshad Warsi	Arshad Warsi
Manav Shrivastava	Jaaved Jaaferi	Jaaved Jaaferi	Jaaved Jaaferi	Jaaved Jaaferi
Boman Contractor	Ashish Chaudhary	Ashish Chaudhary		
Kabir Nayak	Sanjay Dutt	Sanjay Dutt		
"Babubhai" / Johnny D'Costa / Jonny	Sanjay Mishra		Sanjay Mishra	Sanjay Mishra
Nari Contractor	Govardhan Asrani			
Mohsin Bhai		Zakir Hussain		
Kamini		Mallika Sherawat		
Kiya Nayak		Kangana Ranaut		
Baba Batanand Swami / Bata bhai		Satish Kaushik		
Guddu Rastogi			Ajay Devgan	Ajay Devgan
Prachi Malrotkar Rastogi / Alia			Esha Gupta	Esha Gupta
Avinash "Avi" Patel			Anil Kapoor	
Bindiya "Bindu" Patel			Madhuri Dixit	
Raju			Johnny Lever	
Pilot Amyjot Randhawa / Pilot Pintu Choskey	Manoj Pahwa		Manoj Pahwa	
Commissioner Shamsher Singh			Boman Irani	
Chinnappa Swamy			Mahesh Manjrekar	
Adhoora				Ravi Kishan
Prithvi				Upendra Limaye
Paaro				Anjali Anand
Rosy				Sanjeeda Sheikh
Jheenga				Vijay Patkar
Gopaldas Seth				Brijendra Kala

== Additional crew and production details ==
Occupation	Film			
Occupation	Dhamaal (2007)	Double Dhamaal (2011)	Total Dhamaal (2019)	Dhamaal 4 (2026)
Director	Indra Kumar	Indra Kumar	Indra Kumar	Indra Kumar
Producer(s)	Indra Kumar, Ashok Thakeria	Indra Kumar, Ashok Thakeria	Ajay Devgn, Ashok Thakeria, Indra Kumar, Markand Adhikari, Anand Pandit	Ajay Devgn, Bhushan Kumar, Krishan Kumar, Ashok Thakeria, Indra Kumar, Abhishek Pathak, Kumar Mangat Phatak
Writer(s) - Dialogues	Paritosh Painter, Bunty Rathore	Farhad-Sajid	Bunty Rathore	Bunty Rathore
Screenplay	Paritosh Painter, Balwinder Singh Suri	Tushar Hiranandani	Ved Prakash, Paritosh Painter	Paritosh Painter, Balwinder Singh Suri, Ved Prakash, Bunty Rathore
Story	Paritosh Painter	Tushar Hiranandani	Indra Kumar	Aakash Kaushik
Cinematography	Vijay Arora	Aseem Bajaj	Keiko Nakahara	Sudhir K. Chaudhary
Editor	Sanjay Sankla	Sanjay Sankla	Dharmendra Sharma	Sanjay Sankla
Music	Adnan Sami	Anand Raj Anand	Gourov–Roshin	Tanishk Bagchi, Guru Randhawa, Aditya Dev, Neelkamal Singh, Gill Macchrai, Rony Ajnali, Sanju Rathod, Param Raj, Sanjeev–Darshan
Background Score	Sanjoy Chowdhury	Sanjoy Chowdhury	Sandeep Shirodkar	Amar Mohile
Production Companies	Maruti International	Maruti International	Ajay Devgn FFilms, Maruti International, Sri Adhikari Brothers, Fox Star Studios, Pen India Limited, Mangal Murti Films	T-Series Films, Ajay Devgn FFilms, Maruti International, Panorama Studios
Distributing Companies	BIG Pictures, Shemaroo Entertainment	Reliance Entertainment	Fox Star Studios	Panorama Studios
Running Time	137 minutes	140 minutes	127 minutes	143 minutes

== Reception ==
Box office

Film	Release date	Budget	Box office revenue	Ref.
Dhamaal	7 September 2007	₹10 crore (US$2.42 million)	₹50.73 crore (US$12.27 million)	
Double Dhamaal	24 June 2011	₹29 crore (US$6.21 million)	₹70.54 crore (US$15.11 million)	
Total Dhamaal	22 February 2019	₹90 crore (US$12.78 million)–₹100 crore (US$14.2 million)	₹228.27 crore (US$32.42 million)	
Dhamaal 4	9 July 2026	₹200 crore (US$21 million)	₹210.09 crore (US$22 million)	
Total		₹329 crore (US$34 million)–₹339 crore (US$35 million)	₹559.63 crore (US$58 million)	

Critical reception

Film	Rotten Tomatoes
Dhamaal	N/A (2 reviews)
Double Dhamaal	17% (4.3/10 average rating) (6 reviews)
Total Dhamaal	30% (3/10 average rating) (10 reviews)
Dhamaal 4	20% (3.7/10 average rating) (10 reviews)

== See also ==
- Welcome (film series)
- Housefull (film series)
- Golmaal (film series)
