= Indra Kumar =

Indian filmmaker

- Born: Indra Irani; Botad, Gujarat, India
- Occupations: Director, producer
- Relatives: Actress Shweta Kumar (daughter); 3 sisters and 4 brothers including: Adi Irani (brother); Aruna Irani (sister); Firoz Irani (brother); Kuku Kohli (brother-in-law); Bindu (cousin)

Indra Kumar (born Indra Irani) is an Indian film director and producer. He had five Filmfare nominations, has also appeared in number of Gujarati-language films. His latest film produced is Thank God (2022).

Kumar debuted into direction as well as production with Dil (1990) and then directed the different concept-based drama films Beta (1992), Raja (1995) and Ishq (1997); all four being among the highest-grossing Hindi films of respective years and critically as well as commercially successful. He received two Filmfare Award for Best Director nominations for Beta and Raja. He followed this with a number of average grossers or commercial failures, causing a setback, except the comedy Masti (2004), which ended with Dhamaal (2007). Kumar went on to make commercially successful comedy film sequels including Double Dhamaal (2011), Grand Masti (2013) and Total Dhamaal (2019). The latter ranks among the highest-grossing Hindi films and remains his highest-grossing release till date.

== Personal life ==
He is the brother of actress Aruna Irani. He is father of actress Shweta Kumar.

== Career ==
=== 1990–97: Directorial debut and wider success ===
In 1990, Kumar made his directorial debut with the romance Dil starring Aamir Khan and Madhuri Dixit. The film, which was co-produced by him and based on a tale of parental opposition of teenage love, emerged as a major commercial success, and finished up as India's highest-grossing Indian film of the year, with domestic gross earnings of ₹180 million (US$1.9 million). The film was nominated for eight awards at the 36th Filmfare Awards, including a nomination in the Best Film category for Kumar.

The drama Beta (1992), based on the concept of how greediness overtakes family values, was Kumar's next directorial venture. The film starred Madhuri Dixit, Anil Kapoor, and Kumar's elder sister Aruna Irani, and proved to be a major commercial success as well as the highest-grossing Indian film of the year just like Dil. For directing the film, Kumar received his first Best Director nomination at Filmfare.

In 1995, Kumar once again collaborated with Dixit in the romantic action film Raja, which also starred Sanjay Kapoor. The film, which narrated the story of a man and woman who were about to get married in their childhood but fall in love and get married in their youth, proved to be the 3rd highest-grossing Indian film of the year. Kumar received a second Best Director nomination at Filmfare.

In 1997, Kumar directed the action romantic comedy Ishq starring Ajay Devgn, Aamir Khan, Kajol, and Juhi Chawla. The film, based on the subject of true love, received negative reviews from critics but proved to be one of the year's top-grossing productions with grossing revenues of ₹500 million (US$5.3 million) worldwide.

=== 1999–2006: Commercial failures and Masti ===
From 1999 to 2006, Kumar continued to direct a number of films but experienced a setback. These films were Mann, Aashiq, Rishtey, Masti (the first film of the Masti franchise), and Pyare Mohan. With the exception of Masti which was moderately successful, all these films were commercial failures and critical successes.

=== 2007–present: Resurgence and expansion into comedies ===
Kumar's directorial career prospects briefly improved when he directed the ensemble comedy Dhamaal (2007), the first film of the Dhamaal franchise, starring Sanjay Dutt, Riteish Deshmukh, Aashish Chaudhary, Arshad Warsi, and Javed Jaffrey. The film received unfavourable reactions from critics and was a commercial success, grossing over ₹800 million (US$8.5 million) worldwide.

After a four-year absence from directing films, Kumar directed Double Dhamaal (2011). A sequel to Dhamaal (2007), it retained the five previous lead actors, and also added Kangana Ranaut and Mallika Sherawat in the roles of Sanjay Dutt's sister and wife respectively. Collecting totally ₹710 million (US$7.6 million) worldwide, Double Dhamaal proved to be a box office hit, despite being critically panned unlike its predecessor

Kumar's next directorial venture was yet another comedy film sequel–Grand Masti (2013)–a sequel to Masti. It saw Riteish Deshmukh, Aftab Shivdasani, and Vivek Oberoi, reprising their roles from Masti, with Karishma Tanna, Manjari Fadnis, and Sonali Kulkarni entering the cast as the new female leads. The film received positive response from critics and became the most successful entry in the Masti franchise, with a gross revenue of more than ₹1.3 billion (US$14 million).

The following year, Kumar directed the drama Super Nani (2014), which starred Sharman Joshi, Rekha, Randhir Kapoor, Anupam Kher, and Kumar's daughter Shweta Kumar. It failed to do well at the box office. He next directed the third installment of the Masti franchise, titled Great Grand Masti (2016), again starring the previous three male leads. Unlike the success of the previous two films, Great Grand Masti was a major financial failure grossing ₹190 million (US$2.0 million) worldwide on a budget of ₹390 million (US$4.2 million).

In 2019, Kumar directed the third installment of the Dhamaal franchise, titled Total Dhamaal, which was not a sequel to Double Dhamaal and was a reboot to it, having a different story and a different genre of adventure comedy. Ajay Devgn, Madhuri Dixit, Anil Kapoor, Riteish Deshmukh, Javed Jaffrey, Arshad Warsi, Boman Irani, and Esha Gupta played the lead roles (Deshmukh, Jaffrey, and Warsi reprised their roles). Total Dhamaal proved to be Kumar's highest-grossing film release, collecting ₹2 billion (US$21 million) within 12 days of its release, thus attaining a super hit status.

Kumar will next direct Hera Pheri 3, the third installment of the comedy franchise Hera Pheri, starring Akshay Kumar, Paresh Rawal, and Suniel Shetty. Kumar announced to direct the film after the death of Neeraj Vora, who directed the second installment and was to direct Hera Pheri 3 too. Later, reports suggested that Kumar will not direct Hera Pheri 3, so Priyadarshan, who was the director of the first installment, will return for Hera Pheri 3. But it was later finally confirmed by Kumar that he will direct the film.

== Filmography ==
=== As director ===
- Dil (1990)
- Beta (1992)
- Raja (1995)
- Ishq (1997)
- Mann (1999)
- Aashiq (2001)
- Rishtey (2002)
- Masti (2004)
- Pyare Mohan (2006)
- Dhamaal (2007)
- Double Dhamaal (2011)
- Grand Masti (2013)
- Super Nani (2014)
- Great Grand Masti (2016)
- Total Dhamaal (2019)
- Thank God (2022)
- Dhamaal 4 (2026)

=== As producer ===
- Mohabbat (1985)
- Kasam (1988)
- Daddy Cool (2009)
- Tera Yaar Hoon Main (2026)
