= Dhamaal 4 =

2026 Indian film by Indra Kumar

- Theatrical release poster
- Directed by: Indra Kumar
- Screenplay by: Paritosh Painter; Balvinder Singh Suri; Vedd Prakash; Bunty Rathore
- Dialogues by: Bunty Rathore
- Produced by: Ajay Devgn; Bhushan Kumar; Krishan Kumar; Ashok Thakeria; Indra Kumar; Anand Pandit; Kumar Mangat Pathak
- Starring: Ajay Devgan; Arshad Warsi; Riteish Deshmukh; Jaaved Jaaferi; Ravi Kishan; Sanjay Mishra; Upendra Limaye; Anjali Anand; Sanjeeda Sheikh; Esha Gupta
- Cinematography: Sudhir K. Chaudhary
- Edited by: Sanjay Sankla
- Music by: Songs: Tanishk Bagchi; Guru Randhawa; Aditya Dev; Neelkamal Singh; Gill Machhrai; Rony Ajnali; Sanju Rathod; Param Raj; Sanjeev–Darshan; Score: Amar Mohile
- Production companies: T-Series Films; Devgn Films; Panorama Studios; Maruti International
- Distributed by: Panorama Studios; Cinépolis (Delhi-UP only)
- Release date: 10 July 2026
- Running time: 143 minutes
- Country: India
- Language: Hindi
- Budget: ₹200 crore
- Box office: ₹224.61 crore

Dhamaal 4 (transl. Ruckus 4) is a 2026 Indian Hindi-language adventure comedy film directed by Indra Kumar. The film is produced by T-Series Films, Devgn Films, Panorama Studios, and Maruti International. It is the fourth installment of the Dhamaal film series and a standalone sequel to Dhamaal (2007), Double Dhamaal (2011) and Total Dhamaal (2019). The film stars an ensemble cast including Ajay Devgn, Arshad Warsi, Riteish Deshmukh, Jaaved Jaaferi, Ravi Kishan, Sanjay Mishra, Upendra Limaye, Anjali Anand, Sanjeeda Sheikh and Esha Gupta.

Principal photography concluded in September 2025. Dhamaal 4 was theatrically released on 10 July 2026. It received mixed-to-negative reviews from critics and is the 7th highest-grossing Hindi film of 2026.

== Plot ==
Adhoora, a "professional pirate" and his men capture Prithvi on a ship for decoding a map to know where the treasure of Shaitaan Singh, a ruthless pirate from the British Raj, is located. However, Adhoora ends up burning the map by mistake, and only Prithvi remembers the location. Prithvi's former partner, Guddu Rastogi reaches the ship with jet ski and confronts Prithvi on why he double crossed Guddu. Adhoora's henchman, Jheenga, spots them and Adhoora orders his men to fight Guddu, leading to chaos. Mistakenly, Adhoora heats up a cannonball in his hands and ends up throwing it onto the ship itself. Guddu manages to escape the ship before it bursts into flames.

In Janakpur, Guddu is dating Alia, who is a widow, with a daughter, Amaira, and a son, Aarav. But the children, who deem their old father irreplaceable, dislike him and try to scare him and his confidante, Johnny, away with the help of their house help, Gangubai. Alia suggests a bonding trip.

Meanwhile, Deshbandhu "Lallan" Roy, in a temple prays to God for a beautiful wife with a father who has extra-large house and car which he would get to own eventually. He sees Paaro, an overweight woman, entering the temple, stepping out of a luxury car, mistaking her to be the daughter of a rich man. They marry soon, only for him to realize right after marriage that Paaro's father is not Seth Garibdas (the rich man) but Gopaldas Seth, the rich man's chauffeur, to his disappointment. Unbeknownst to Lallan's sadness, Gopaldas gifts him an auto-rickshaw and gives a paper of a land deed worth ₹50 lakh on Paaro's name to encash. Lallan leaves home for it with Paaro quickly.

Meanwhile, Aditya "Adi" Srivastav tries to fake a leg injury to garner sympathy of his estranged wife, Rosy. She left him because on the day of their wedding night, Manav, Adi's brother, accidentally set her wedding dress on fire. Once again, Manav screws up, making Rosy ask for an ultimatum to Adi: choose her or choose Manav and divorce her.

Guddu, Johnny, Amaira and Aarav go on the bonding trip. On the highway, Guddu finds Prithvi and chases him but Adhoora and his men appear and chase him too. Prithvi gets in Guddu's car and they all flee, but Prithvi falls down and gets stuck at the edge of the cliff. Guddu and Johnny try to save him but they also fall down and get stuck. Coincidentally, Amaira and Aarav, while asking for help on the highway bump into Lallan, Paaro, Adi, Rosy and Manav. They try to help rescue them by forming a human chain but Prithvi realises he is about to die so he tells them the location of Shaitaan Singh's treasure, under an O, in a cave in a jungle with an M at an island near a village.

They all reach the island and eventually find the treasure but are caught by Adhoora and his men. It is revealed that Prithvi fell into a pond and then was found by Adhoora and his men, and forced to give up the treasure's location. Mistakenly, Adhoora ends up lighting up a dynamite while they all are in the cave, causing the treasure to fall down a pit. Guddu saves Adhoora's life and also of Amaira and Aarav. Paaro and Lallan help each other save themselves and Lallan realises he shouldn't have body shamed Paaro. Manav saves Rosy's life. She forgives Manav and takes back her ultimatum. All the treasure is lost but everyone all emerges safe. Adhoora turns his ship into a tourist place because Guddu saved his life. Amaira and Aarav also finally warm up to Guddu as the stepfather. As Manav is about to throw away an article that he saved, Guddu opens it and takes something from it, which is revealed as another map. Prithvi decodes the map, which reveals "Dhamaal 5".

== Cast ==
- Ajay Devgn as Guddu Rastogi
- Arshad Warsi as Aditya "Adi" Srivastav
- Riteish Deshmukh Deshbandhu "Lallan" Roy
- Jaaved Jaaferi as Manav Srivastav
- Ravi Kishan as Adhoora
- Sanjay Mishra as Jonny
- Upendra Limaye as Prithvi
- Anjali Anand as Paaro
- Sanjeeda Sheikh as Rosy
- Esha Gupta as Alia
- Vijay Patkar as Jheenga
- Akshara Padwal as Amaira
- Riyansh Dabhi as Aarav
- Brijendra Kala as Gopaldas Seth
- Namrata Awate Sambherao as Gangubai
- Satish Kaushik as Bata Bhai (AI-generated, cameo)
- Jackie Shroff as cameo (AI-generated Voiceover)
- Guru Randhawa (special appearance in the song ‘’Qeher’’)
- Ketika Sharma (special appearance in the song "Qeher")
- Neelkamal Singh (special appearance in the song "Chatni")
- Sanju Rathod (special appearance in the song "Saree")

== Production ==
=== Development ===
Development for the fourth film in the franchise began following the box office success of Total Dhamaal in 2019. Director Indra Kumar officially announced the project in 2024, confirming that the lead trio of Deshmukh, Warsi, and Jaaferi would reunite with Ajay Devgn.

=== Filming ===
Principal photography began in 21 March 2025 and spanned over six months. Filming locations included Mumbai and Madh Island, where several key sequences were shot. The production officially wrapped on 6 September 2025, with the makers releasing a "Dhamaal Times" themed promotional poster to mark the occasion.

== Soundtrack ==
Dhamaal 4

Soundtrack album by Tanishk Bagchi, Guru Randhawa, Aditya Dev, Neelkamal Singh, Gill Machhrai, Rony Ajnali, Sanju Rathod, Param Raj, and Sanjeev–Darshan
- Released: 9 July 2026
- Recorded: 2025–2026
- Genre: Feature film soundtrack
- Length: 15:07
- Language: Hindi
- Label: T-Series
External audio
- Official Audio Jukebox on YouTube

The soundtrack has been composed by Tanishk Bagchi, Guru Randhawa, Aditya Dev, Neelkamal Singh, Gill Macchrai, Rony Ajnali, Sanju Rathod, Param Raj and Sanjeev–Darshan with lyrics written by Dheeraj Babuaan, Guru Randhawa, Gill Machhrai, Rony Ajnali, Sanju Rathod, Rashmi Virag, Kumaar, and Sanjeev–Darshan. The film score was composed by Amar Mohile.

The first song "Chatni" was released on 15 June 2026. The second single "Qeher" was released on 19 June 2026. The third single "Saree" recreated from Sanju Rathod's 2024 song, Gulabi Sadi, was released on 28 June 2026.

No.	Title	Lyrics	Music	Singer(s)	Length
1.	"Chatni"	Dheeraj Babuaan	Aditya Dev, Neelkamal Singh	Mamta Sharma, Neelkamal Singh	2:35
2.	"Qeher"	Guru Randhawa, Gill Machhrai, Rony Ajnali	Guru Randhawa, Gill Machhrai, Rony Ajnali	Guru Randhawa	2:35
3.	"Saree"	Sanju Rathod, Rashmi Virag	Sanju Rathod, Tanishk Bagchi	Sanju Rathod	3:56
4.	"Paisa Lao"	Kumaar	Tanishk Bagchi, Param Raj	Neeraj Shridhar	2:24
5.	"Dhamaal 4 Theme Track"	Sanjeev–Darshan	Sanjeev–Darshan	Sanjeev–Darshan, Vishal Mishra, Sonu Kakkar, Brodha V	3:37
Total length:					15:07

== Release ==
=== Theatrical ===
Initially scheduled for a 19 March 2026 release during the Eid al-Fitr weekend, the film's release was moved to 12 June 2026 to avoid a clash with Dhurandhar: The Revenge. To avoid box office clashes with other major releases, the date was finalized as 10 July 2026.

=== Certification ===
The film received a U/A 13+ certificate on 2 July 2026 by the Central Board of Film Certification (CBFC). In two places in the film, the scenes having 'obscene' hand gestures were modified and replaced. The CBFC's Examining Committee had also asked the makers to replace 'obscene' words in seven places in the film. No scene in the film was cut. The runtime of the film is 143 minutes.

=== Home media ===
The film began streaming on Netflix from 4 September 2026.

== Reception ==
=== Box office ===
Dhamaal 4 earned ₹13.75 crore at the domestic box office on its opening day. On the second day, the film collected ₹22.48 crore. On the third day, the film collected ₹28.15 crore, taking its total domestic opening weekend nett collection to ₹64.35 crore.

By the end of its run, the film did a business of ₹195 crore in India and ₹29.61 crore overseas, taking its total worldwide gross collection to ₹224.61 crore.

=== Critical response ===
On the review aggregator website Rotten Tomatoes, 18% of 11 critics' reviews are positive, with an average rating of 3.7/10.

A critic at Bollywood Hungama gave 3 out of 5 stars, concluding, "On the whole, Dhamaal 4 is a decent, clean entertainer that should largely appeal to families and kids. However, the screenplay dips in places, and several gags don't land with the intended force, thereby emerging as the film's major minus points." Saibal Chatterjee of NDTV gave the film 2 out of 5 stars, finding it 'unfunny, tedious and dreadfully dunderheaded.' He wrote, "Nothing that Dhamaal 4 throws up (it does so more in hope than with conviction) stays afloat long enough to give the audience anything to crack up over." Titas Chowdhury of News18 gave the film 2 out of 5 stars also, writing, "Every gag is explained, every beat underlined and every punchline repeated until there’s nothing left for the audience to discover on their own, proving Dhamaal 4 has little faith in its audience. And when nothing else works, a wrestling match is orchestrated between a plus-sized woman and a vertically challenged man belonging to a tribal community."

Rishabh Suri of Hindustan Times gave the film 1.5 out of 5 stars, concluding, "Overall, for a film called Dhamaal, there's little fun to be had. It recycles its story, music and even its brand of comedy, hoping nostalgia will do the heavy lifting. It doesn't. The only thing buried under "M ke neeche" is whatever made the first Dhamaal work." Vineeta Kumar of India Today gave the film 1.5 out of 5 stars, also, noting, "The writing, meanwhile, feels trapped in a version of Bollywood comedy that audiences have outgrown ages ago. It makes you want to revisit the original Dhamaal, Golmaal, Dhol or Welcome - films that probably understood an important truth: loud isn't automatically funny." Shubhra Gupta of The Indian Express gave the film 1 star out of 5, observing, "Kumar's inability to move forward from his creaky story-telling style, so stuck in the previous millennium, sinks this fourth iteration even before it's had time to float."

== Future ==
A sequel, titled Dhamaal 5, was teased in the film's climax scene, marking the fifth installment in the Dhamaal franchise.
