= Arpita Chakraborty =

Indian playback singer

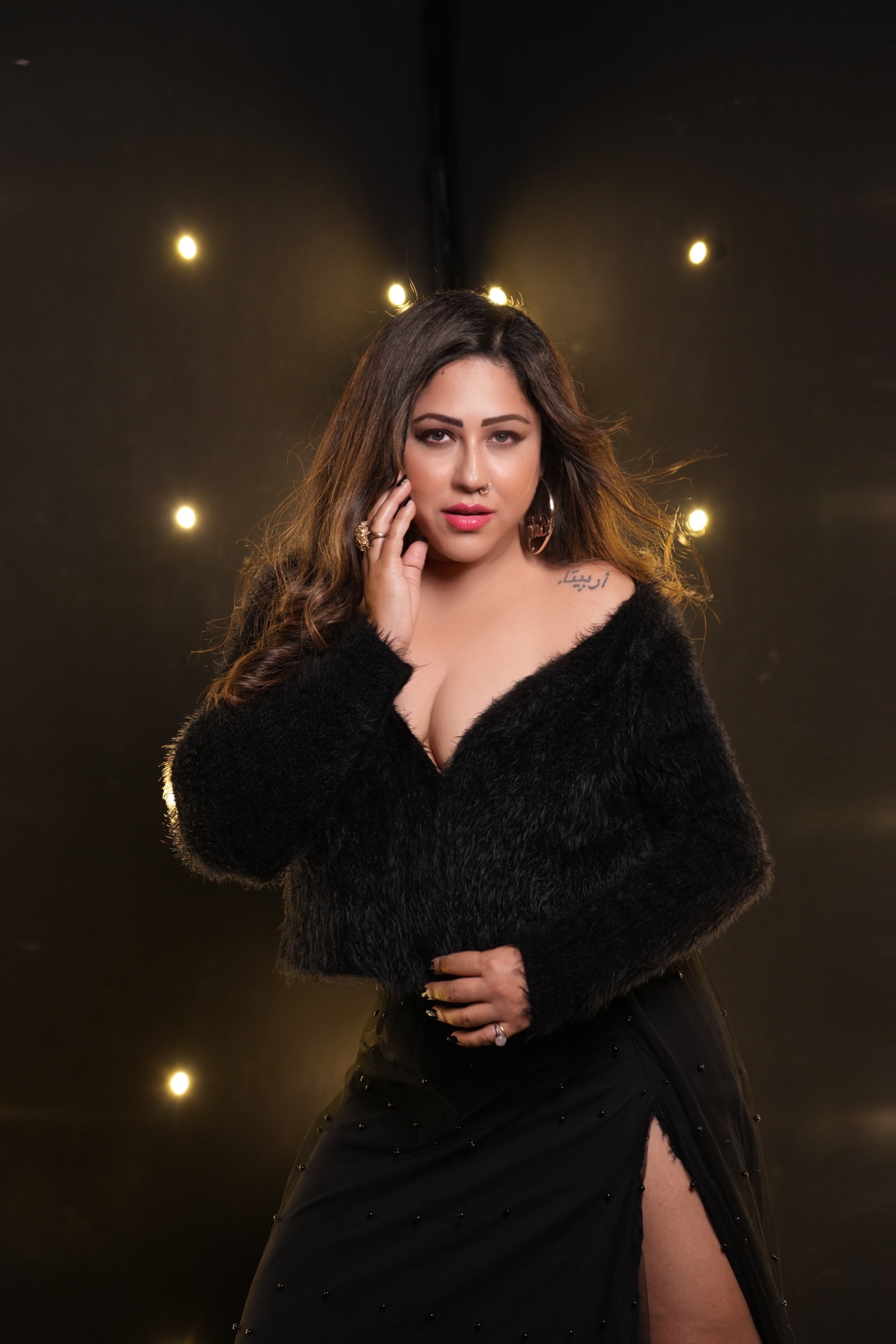
Chakraborty in 2023

Arpita Chakraborty is an Indian playback singer and live performer. She is the playback voice behind the song "Ras ke Bhare Tore Nain" from the film Satyagraha, "Lori Of Death" from the film Ragini MMS 2, "Paisa Yeh Paisa" from the film Total Dhamaal, "Khoya Khoya" from the film Hero, title track of the film Bezubaan Ishq, "Kanabadunaa" and "Manase Pedavina" from the Telugu film Nee Jathaga Nenundali, among others. She sung the title song of the Television Serial Tashan-e-Ishq.

== Discography ==
Year	Film	Song	Language	Music	Lyrics	Co-singer(s)	Note
2013	Satyagraha	"Raske Bhare Tore Nain"	Hindi	Aadesh Shrivastava	Prasoon Joshi	Shafqat Amanat Ali	
2013	Satyagraha	"Raske Bhare Tore Nain" (House Mix)	Hindi	Aadesh Shrivastava	Prasoon Joshi	Aadesh Shrivastava	
2014	Ragini MMS 2	"Lori Of Death"	Hindi	Chirrantan Bhatt	Manoj Yadav		
2014	Nee Jathaga Nenundali	"Kanabadunaa"	Telugu	Jeet Gannguli	Chandrabose	KK	
2014	Nee Jathaga Nenundali	"Manase Pedavina"	Telugu	Mithoon	Chandrabose	Arijit Singh	
2015	Hero	"Khoya Khoya"	Hindi	Sachin–Jigar	Niranjan Iyengar	Mohit Chauhan, Priya Saraiya, Tanishka Sanghvi	
2015	Bezubaan Ishq	"Bezubaan Ishq - Title Track"	Hindi	Rupesh Verma	Jashwant Gangani	Javed Ali	
2015	Total Dhamaal	"Paisa Yeh Paisa"	Hindi	Gourov-Roshin (original by Laxmikant–Pyarelal)	Kunwar Juneja (original by Anand Bakshi)	Dev Negi, Subhro Ganguly	Originally sung by Kishore Kumar from the film Karz
2024	Pushpa 2: The Rule	"Peelings"	Bengali	Devi Sri Prasad	Srijato Bandopadhyay	Timir Biswas	Dubbed version
