= Dhamaal =

2007 Indian film by Indra Kumar

- Theatrical release poster
- Directed by: Indra Kumar
- Written by: Dialogues: Paritosh Painter; Bunty Rathore
- Screenplay by: Paritosh Painter; Balwinder Singh Suri
- Story by: Paritosh Painter
- Based on: It's a Mad, Mad, Mad, Mad World by Stanley Kramer
- Produced by: Indra Kumar; Ashok Thakeria
- Starring: Sanjay Dutt; Ritesh Deshmukh; Arshad Warsi; Aashish Chaudhary; Jaaved Jaaferi; Asrani; Sanjay Mishra; Vijay Raaz; Manoj Pahwa; Tiku Talsania; Prem Chopra
- Cinematography: Vijay Kumar Arora
- Edited by: Sanjay Sankla
- Music by: Score: Sanjoy Chowdhury; Songs: Adnan Sami
- Production company: Maruti International
- Distributed by: Shemaroo Entertainment
- Release date: 7 September 2007
- Running time: 137 minutes
- Country: India
- Language: Hindi
- Box office: est. ₹50.73 crore

Dhamaal (transl. Fun) is a 2007 Indian Hindi-language comedy film directed by Indra Kumar and produced by Ashok Thakeria. The film stars Sanjay Dutt, Riteish Deshmukh, Arshad Warsi, Aashish Chaudhary and Javed Jaffrey in the lead roles, with Asrani, Sanjay Mishra, Murli Sharma, Vijay Raaz, Manoj Pahwa, Tiku Talsania and Prem Chopra in supporting roles. Inspired by Stanley Kramer's It's a Mad, Mad, Mad, Mad World (1963), it is the first installment of the Dhamaal film series.

In 2011, the film spawned a sequel, titled Double Dhamaal, with the lead cast reprising their roles. A third spiritual sequel, named Total Dhamaal, was released in February 2019, with only Deshmukh, Warsi and Jaffrey returning with an entirely new cast and a fresh story, having no connections to its predecessors.

== Plot ==
The film is about four friends - The first one, Deshbandhu Roy, Aditya "Adi" Shrivastav, his autistic brother Manav, and finally, Boman Contractor, the spoiled son of Nari Contractor, who loves his car more than his son. All four of them wind up together in a woman's house, where they go partying at nightclubs. In the house however, they're useless, as they don't do anything around and haven't paid their rent yet, the woman kicks them out of the house for not paying their rents and tells them to get a decent job.

Desperate to earn money, they cook up a plan. Adi tells Manav to steal a painting from the house to sell to the son of the late businessman Dwiwedi. However, Manav accidentally picks up a blank canvas. They humorously sell the painting for Rs. 20,000 to Dwiwedi. The next day, they pick up the original painting with the intention to sell it to Aggarwal, not knowing that he has been murdered. The case is handled by Inspector Kulkarni, who learns that before Aggrawal was murdered he got a call with a code "Horse ate all the grass". When the four arrive at Agrawal's residence, he immediately arrests them after demanding to see the blank painting. While driving on the highway, Kulkarni frees the four upon being informed that they are innocent.

The four are overjoyed until they suddenly witness a car accident and encounter the dying driver, Don Bose. He tells them that he has hidden Rs. 10 crores of money in the St. Sebastian garden in Goa under a big 'W'. He tells them to divide the money equally among themselves and then dies. Shortly after, Inspector Kabir Nayak, who has been trying to arrest Bose for the past ten years, arrives and tries to extract information from the four but in vain, and they escape from him. Desperate for his promotion, Kabir is determined to capture the four. The four steal Nari's car but not before hitting Nari on the head and making him unconscious. Roy loses control of the car in a forest after nearly colliding an animal and hits it against a tree, breaking both headlights. The next day Kabir is transferred to Yavatmal for failing to capture Bose. Furious, he walks towards his table where Nari is waiting for him to file a complaint against his son for stealing his car, and gives Kabir the photos of Boman and his car. Meanwhile, all four come across a broken bridge which is the only way through the forest. They decide to jump the car but Boman is reluctant to do so. They manage to succeed but it crashes and explodes.

Kabir tracks the four down after discovering the destroyed car. He is able to learn the location of the treasure due to Manav's naivete. He ties all four of them to a tree and sets off. However, they manage to escape and reach a dhaba and pretend to be detectives, making the villagers and the dhaba owner believe that Kabir is Pasha, a dangerous gang leader and lures them to capture him for the reward would be Rs. 15 lakhs, leading to a brawl. The four arrive at a settlement – 60% would belong to the four and 40% would belong to Kabir. But Adi insists on having his and Manav's money in separate shares when they were planning to pay Boman as one share for damaging his car. Consequently, a fight ensues and it is decided that whoever reaches the treasure first would take all the money.

All four part ways and try to reach Goa as soon as possible. Boman encounters his father; though Nari initially wants to kill his son for wrecking the car, he changes his mind after he learns about the ten crores. Nari and Boman find a private pilot but hilarious conditions cause the duo to fly in utter despair when the pilot abandons the steer and collapses into alcoholism while airline customer service provider D. K. Malik pushes them to near madness, failing to save himself, but they manage to reach Goa. Adi and Manav travel together. They keep failing to hitch a ride to take them to Goa until they bump into Iyer, who irritates them throughout the journey by continuously extending his patronymic name while introducing himself. Roy encounters a dacoit Babu Bhai and agree to divide the money among themselves provided they reach Goa as soon as possible. Kabir nearly escapes death with a school child whom he saved as he hangs off a cliff and is pushed to deal with some school children who were supposed to visit and perform at a charity event.

Finally, as they together reach the garden, they mutually agree to find the treasure together before dividing it. They locate four palm trees which make the shape of a 'W', but Kabir arrives there and tells them to divide the money against them to which all agree. They dig there and are able to find the money. But again a fight ensues over the payment for the damage of the car. All are enraged when Adi and Manav are decided to pay the money as one unit but are separate units while taking money. In the ensuing argument, Kabir runs away with the man, and everyone gives chase. Eventually they end up at a charity auction, where the commissioner congratulates Kabir on giving away the money for a noble cause.

== Cast ==
- Sanjay Dutt as Inspector Kabir Naik, a no-nonsense cop
- Riteish Deshmukh as Deshbandhu Roy; Adi, Manav and Boman's best friend
- Arshad Warsi as Aditya "Adi" Shrivastav, Manav's brother; Roy and Boman's best friend
- Aashish Chaudhary as Boman Contractor, Nari's eccentric son; Roy, Adi and Manav's best friend
- Jaaved Jaaferi as Manav Shrivastav, Adi's brother; Boman and Roy's best friend
- Prem Chopra as Bose
- Asrani as Nari Contractor, Boman's eccentric father
- Tiku Talsania as Commissioner M. I. Chaturvedi
- Vijay Raaz as Dev Kumar "D. K." Malik
- Suhasini Mulay as the Landlady
- Sanjay Mishra as Dacoit Babu Bhai, Roy's friend
- Murali Sharma as Inspector Kulkarni
- Muhammad Zaki as crying old man
- Vinay Apte as Prabhakarana Sripalawardhana Atapattu Jayasuriya Laxmana Shivramakrishna Shivavenkata Rajashekhara Srinivasana Tiruchirappalli Yekyaparampeel Parambatur Chinnaswami Mutthuswami Venugopal Iyer
- Vijay Patkar as Air Traffic Controller
- Rana Jung Bahadur as Kailash, the owner of a Dhaba
- Surendra Rajan as Orphanage Man
- Ninad Kamat as Function Host
- Ankita M. Sharma as Shabnam "Shabbo", the woman going to Mental Hospital
- Liam Mara
- Tariq Zaheer
- Manoj Pahwa as Pilot Amyjot Randhawa
- Kiku Sharda as Constable
- D. Santosh as Encounter Cop
- Sahil Chauhan as Kid Himesh Reshammiya
- Kurush Deboo as Amit Dwivedi, Dwivedi's son (victim of the fraud painting con)
- Sanjay Swaraj as Samir Agarwal (special appearance)
- Rana Jung Bahadur as Kailash Da Dhaba Owner
- Vaibhav Mathur as Dacoit's man
- Vishwajeet Soni as Bengali Car Driver
- Jayesh Thakkar as Taxi Driver

== Soundtrack ==
Dhamaal

Soundtrack album by Adnan Sami
- Genre: Feature film soundtrack
- Label: T-Series

The film's soundtrack is composed by Adnan Sami with lyrics penned by Sameer. The songs, "Dekho Dekho" and "Miss India Marthi Mujhpe", were both known as the title song, since the main chorus of both the songs included the title "Dhamaal".

All lyrics are written by Sameer; all music is composed by Adnan Sami.

No.	Title	Singer(s)	Length
1.	"Chal Nache Shor Machalein"	Adnan Sami, Shaan	4:56
2.	"Chandani Raat Hai Saiyan"	Asha Bhosle, Amit Kumar	4:22
3.	"Dekho Dekho Dil Ye Bole"	Adnan Sami, Shaan	5:13
4.	"Miss India Martee Mujhpe"	Adnan Sami, Amit Kumar	5:05
5.	"Chal Nache Shor Machalein" (Instrumental)	Navin Prabhakar	4:22
6.	"Chandani Raat Hai Saiyan" (Instrumental)	Raghav Sachar	4:02
7.	"Chandani Raat Hai Saiyan" (Remix)	Sandeep Shirodkar	4:56

== Critical response ==
Taran Adarsh of IndiaFM gave the film 3 out of 5, writing "On the whole, DHAMAAL is one joyride that should keep its investors smiling!" Rajeev Masand gave the film 3 out of 5, writing "A little over two hours long, barely any time wasted on unnecessary songs, and surprisingly, the complete absence of any romantic track – there’s so much to like about Dhamaal. Then that’s three out of five and a thumbs up for director Indra Kumar’s squeaky-clean comedy Dhamaal. Sometimes, a good laugh is all you need to make your day. Don’t miss this one, a good laugh is guaranteed. " Syed Firdaus Ashraf of Rediff.com gave the film 3 out of 5, writing "Actors like Vijay Raaz (as the Air Traffic Controller who tries to give directions to a plane that has lost its pilot, Manoj Pahwa, to binge drinking), and Sanjay Mishra (a dacoit) take the film to another level. However, the film could have been tighter. Editor Sanjay Sankla should have been better with the scissors. Besides, the story doesn't run too deep. It is never explained how the four good-for-nothing blokes become friends in the first place. Despite the minor flaws though, Dhamaal is similar to David Dhawan's brand of comedies: Fully dhamaal!"

Khalid Mohamed of Hindustan Times gave more mixed review, writing "In sum, Dhamaal isn’t exactly what the title promises. But it does have its laugh-out-loud moments.. it’s not bad at all. Go ahead and try. "

== Sequel ==
A sequel named Double Dhamaal was released in 2011. The third film of the franchise was named Total Dhamaal and released in 2019, the fourth film in the franchise named Dhamaal 4 was released in 2026, whereas the fifth film in the franchise has been announced and pre production will begin soon .

== See also ==
- Mast Maja Maadi, a 2008 Indian Kannada-language remake
