= Inshallah, Football =

- Poster
- Directed by: Ashvin Kumar
- Produced by: Javed Jaffrey
- Release date: 2010
- Running time: 80 minutes
- Country: India
- Languages: Kashmiri, Urdu, English

Inshallah, Football is a documentary film by Ashvin Kumar about an aspiring footballer who was denied the right to travel abroad on the pretext that his father was a militant in the 1990s. The film was completed in 2010, and has faced difficulties getting released in India. The film's first screening in India at the India Habitat Center received this review from Tehelka magazine, 'Kumar's camera catches the irony of Kashmir's physical beauty, the claustrophobia of militarisation, the dread and hopelessness of children born into war and the nuances of relationships. It also filters the inherent joie-de-vivre of youth, even if that flows uneasily with Kashmir's collective memory of unmitigated grief...There is no better way to understand Kashmir right now.'. The film was shot by Kumar himself using five different camera formats "There is a rough, almost unpolished, feel to Inshallah, Football. The narrative runs unfettered, with an energy of its own." says Tehelka, "We shot with five different cameras, from DSLRs to the best equipment. The idea was to watch life unfold and get under the skin of the audience." adds Kumar.

== Plot ==
Inshallah, Football is about 18-year-old Basharat Baba, known as "Basha". His father, Bashir, was a much-wanted leader of the armed group Hizbul Mujahideen. When he left his home in Kashmir to join the training camps in Pakistan in the early 1990s, his son Basharat was barely two months old.

Basharat belongs to a new generation of Kashmiris, having grown up under the shadow of a protracted conflict. His passion is football, and he has been coached by Juan Marcos Troia, an Argentinean national and FIFA accredited football coach by profession. Marcos aspires to breed world class players from Kashmir; he and his wife, being attached to both Basha and Kashmir, migrate to Srinagar with their three daughters to take up Basha's cause.

Marcos runs a football academy called International Sports Academy Trust; and an exchange program for his most talented players to train at Santos FC, Pele's old club in Brazil. Basharat was one of chosen few, but was denied a passport by the Government of India. The passport in question did come through after Jammu and Kashmir Chief Minister Omar Abdullah intervened.

Inshallah, Football tells this story through Bashir's recollections and travails. Kumar describes the film as "the story of three remarkable men – one is his father who fought for his beliefs, another about the football coach who's come all the way from Argentina to start this football academy, and this young man who is struggling to play football."

== Reception and accolades ==
The film has been critically acclaimed and played in competition part of the wide-angle documentary section at the Pusan Film Festival, where it also received the Asian Network of Documentary (AND) Fund, and winner of Muhr AsiaAfrica / Documentary /Special Mention : Ashvin Kumar (director) at the Dubai International Film Festival

== Censorship controversy ==
This film has face considerable difficulties in getting the necessary censor certificate, without which it cannot be shown publicly in India. The main stumbling block appears to be the content of the film itself, since it deals with the sensitive and highly political subject of how the Indian armed forces have conducted themselves in Kashmir.

The series and timing of events by which this film's review by the censor has proceeded is unusual, and suggestive of political considerations playing a part in the award of a censor's certificate:

- On 28 October 2010, Pankaja Thakur (CEO of the New Delhi office of censor board) reviewed the film and cleared it for a single private screening. An initial review by a senior censor official would normally indicate that the remainder of the certification process is a formality.
- A review committee in Mumbai, where the film's application for censor certification had been made, subsequently rejected the application altogether.
- A second review committee confirmed the ban. As reported in The Hindu newspaper, sources from India's Ministry of Information & Broadcasting noted that "the problem with the CBFC's committees is that many of the nominated members are either related to government officials like police officers or have a conservative outlook.". Normally, filmmakers are invited to present their case for gaining certification at such reviews, but Kumar and his colleagues were not invited.
- However, Sharmila Tagore, the well-known Indian actress and current chairperson of the Censor Board pressed for a third review. This review was handled in a way that clearly put Kumar at a disadvantage: Kumar received an email from the censor board on 28 December, while in Mumbai, informing him that the review would take place the very next day in New Delhi – 800 miles away. This unexpected shift in venue, and hurried timing of the notification, may have been designed to ensure that Kumar would not be able to present his case directly before the review committee. Following this review, the Censor Board awarded the film an "Adult" ("A") certificate.

The award of an "Adult" certificate for a documentary is very unusual, since an Adult certificate is normally awarded to feature films that include graphic violence and nudity. Such films can be shown only to audiences over the age of 18, and most movie theaters in India will not ordinarily agree to screen such films since it is very difficult to for them to make money in the circumstances.

The explanation for awarding Inshallah, Football was that the film has "characters talking about graphic details of physical and mental torture they had to undergo. The theme of the film is mature and some dialogues can be psychologically damaging for non-adult audience." Kumar, however, asserts that the real purpose of this censorship is to avoid causing embarrassment to the Indian government, with regard to the conduct of the Indian armed forces in Kashmir.

Mrs. Tagore made further comments on the 16th anniversary of the women's press corps that were reported by the online version of Outlook Magazine to which Kumar has responded in an open letter to Mrs. Tagore taking on the wider issue of censorship, the relevance of the censor board using Inshallah, Football as an illustration saying that her comments "...would be mildly amusing if they didn't also cast a shadow on the average Indian citizen's freedoms to produce and receive messages, and if they didn’t potentially compromise the livelihood of members of my (and your) fraternity–those troublesome film-makers who don't toe the line and whose discomfiting messages the nation needs to hear." A separate report of Mrs. Tagore's comments is more direct, calling Kumar's comments 'untrue'. Kumar has responded to this in the aforementioned open letter saying 'You said that my statement about being denied a certification for my film Inshallah, Football was 'untrue'. I was hurt; after all, it is not often that I am called a liar in public.'. Mrs. Tagore has also said in the same interview that Inshallah, Football "(is) a beautiful film and I want everyone to see it," but Kumar counters, "Let me speak plainly. I think you have been used to stamp a sense of 'reasonableness' on the sordid affair of restricting freedom of speech. The decisions of the body you head need to be, or need to be seen to be, more moral, more conservative, more risk-averse, more politically correct and more circumspect (thus, in common parlance, more anal-retentive) than is natural or necessary, even if basic principles of natural justice need to be given a go-by from time to time.". The same open letter also appears on Kumar's blog where it has attracted a fair share of attention by way of adverse comments not only concerning censorship but the Kashmir issue as well

The timing of this award of an Adult certificate to Inshallah, Football is curious, since it coincided with the award of an Adult certificate for a No One Killed Jessica, a film based upon the murder of Jessica Lall by Manu Sharma, a wealthy man with strong political ties to the ruling Indian National Congress. In both cases, there is an appearance of the Indian censor board having taken political considerations into account in their award of Adult certificates. Kumar says that he will now appeal to the CBFC tribunal
