= Double Dhamaal =

2011 Indian film by Indra Kumar

- Theatrical release poster
- Directed by: Indra Kumar
- Written by: Tushar Hiranandani
- Dialogues by: Farhad-Sajid
- Produced by: Indra Kumar; Ashok Thakeria
- Starring: Sanjay Dutt; Riteish Deshmukh; Arshad Warsi; Aashish Chaudhary; Javed Jaffrey; Mallika Sherawat; Kangana Ranaut
- Cinematography: Aseem Bajaj
- Edited by: Sanjay Sankla
- Music by: Songs: Anand Raj Anand; Score: Sanjay Wandrekar; Atul Raninga
- Production company: Maruti Pictures
- Distributed by: Reliance Entertainment
- Release date: 24 June 2011
- Running time: 140 minutes
- Country: India
- Language: Hindi
- Box office: ₹ 70.54 crore

Double Dhamaal, also known as 420s or Super Kameenas, (transl. Double fun) is a 2011 Indian Hindi-language comedy film directed by Indra Kumar. It is a sequel to the 2007 film Dhamaal, and the second installment of the Dhamaal film series. The film stars Sanjay Dutt, Ritesh Deshmukh, Arshad Warsi, Aashish Chaudhary, and Javed Jaffrey who reprise their roles from the previous film, with Kangana Ranaut and Mallika Sherawat as new additions. The theatrical trailer for the film was revealed on 6 May 2011 along with the film Haunted. The film was released on 24 June 2011.

Upon release, the film received mixed reviews from critics, with praise for the performances but criticism for its humor and clichés. Despite this, it was a moderate success at the box office.

A sequel titled Total Dhamaal was released in February 2019, with the main three cast members (Deshmukh, Warsi, and Jaffrey) reprising their roles.

== Plot ==
Continuing on with their antics, the four good-for-nothing friends Roy, Adi, Boman and Manav are still trying to con people for a living. They happen to see their old frenemy Kabir driving a luxurious Mercedes-Benz, and try to find out the secret behind his success. Upon investigating, they find that he is living off his 'wife's' wealth.

They then blackmail him into making them his business partners, but little do the four friends know that Kabir, his girlfriend Kamini along with his sister Kiya have an agenda of their own. Kabir connects them with an investor named Bata Bhai who is also a don. The four friends convince Bata Bhai to invest his money into Kabir's oil project, and the money is then stolen by Kabir. Kabir leaves the country along with Kamini and Kiya, and leaves the four friends to deal with Bata Bhai. However, the four friends are able to leave the city and track Kabir down in Macau.

They make a plan to ruin Kabir's happiness and take their money back by going in disguise. Roy "cons" Kiya by disguising himself as 'Tukiya' and pretending to be in love with her, whilst Adi disguises himself as a Sikh man called 'Ghanta Singh', getting the job of Kabir's "personal assistant". Roy also disguises himself as 'Heera Bhai', a "Gujarati investor" who would supposedly "invest" in Kabir's casino, and Boman acts as his wife, "in love with Kabir" to break his relationship with Kamini. Manav poses as various characters.

However, Kabir, Kamini, and Kiya find out about their plans and decide to pretend to be fooled by the four friends, playing along with their plans. This is only revealed at the end when the four friends reveal themselves, shocking and scaring the four friends, who are incensed at getting tricked by the trio again. The movie ends with them escaping from Johnny Bonzela due to Kabir exposing them to him.

== Cast ==
- Sanjay Dutt as Kabir Nayak
- Mallika Sherawat as Kamini
- Ritesh Deshmukh as Deshbandhu Roy/Lee/Tukaram Sadanand Kale "Tukya"/Heera Bhai
- Kangana Ranaut as Kia Nayak
- Arshad Warsi as Aditya "Adi" Shrivastav/Ghanta Singh/Milan Supari
- Aashish Chaudhary as Boman Contractor/Dodo/Barbara Hori
- Javed Jaffrey as Manav Shrivastav/Jojo/Moty Bhai
- Satish Kaushik as Baba Batanand Swami/Bata Bhai
- Zakir Hussain as Mohsin Bhai
- J. Brandon Hill as Johnny Bonzela
- Harry Josh as Kasim Kekra
- Farzil Pardiwalla as a Municipality worker
- Vaibhav Mathur as Paan eater, guy in devils bar
- Neeraj Kshetrapal as milkman
- Shahid Hasan as Kabir's office Manager
- Khurshed Lawyer as Kabir's Office
- Michael Lagnusas as Alcoholic in Shiny Suit
- Latesh Sharma as Executive

== Production ==
The film was shot in Mehboob Studio, Macau and Hong Kong. At the 'Mahurat' of the film, it was announced that Riteish Deshmukh, Aashish Chaudhary, Arshad Warsi and Jaaved Jaaferi would be reprising their roles as friends again, while Sanjay Dutt plays a millionaire this time. The film focused on the four friends blackmailing Dutt to share all his fortune in the most hilarious ways they can think of. The film finished shooting early May 2011, and brought rights to remake the song "Oye Oye" from the 1989 action film, Tridev.

== Reception ==
=== Critical reception ===
Double Dhamaal received mixed reviews from critics upon release.

On the review aggregator website Rotten Tomatoes, 17% of 6 critics' reviews are positive, with an average rating of 4.3/10.

Top critic Taran Adarsh of Bollywood Hungama awarded the film 4/5 stars, saying that it is "seriously hilarious" and that "sometimes, a good laugh is all you need to make your day. Try not to miss this one, it pledges hilarity in abundance..." Nikhat Kazmi from the Times of India gave the film 3/5 stars and said "This one's definitely not for the fastidious, choosy viewer but for those who don't mind losing it for a bit, Double Dhamaal works like an average Bollywood comedy. Performance-wise, it's one big circus with the guys hogging most of the limelight. The girls -- Mallika and Kangana -- are mere confetti." Mayank Shekhar of the Hindustan Times rated the film with 1 out of 5 stars. Shakti Salgaokar of DNA gave the movie a one and half stars and wrote in his review: "Indra Kumar's recipe for double dhamaal is quite simple – sexual innuendo, potshots at popular films, bad mimicry, foreign locations, a generous dose of overacting, an item song and a gora villain. And as he magnificently presents the climax of the film (which is funny in parts but overall ends up being a damp squib) he leaves you with a threat of a sequel. Spare us the horror, please?." Nikita Kapoor of FilmiTadka rated Double Dhamaal with 2 out of 5 stars and said – "In the end Double Dhamaal is a completely mindless, non-sense comedy, which is a sequel to 2007 film, Dhamaal. If the first one was Dhamaal, then this one was not an iota more than half Dhamaal." Rachel Saltz of The New York Times wrote in her review: "The director, Indra Kumar, lets his baggy tale sprawl to 2 hours and 18 minutes and peppers it with references to other, better films and with movie talk in general. "All characters are fictitious," someone says when the fools are caught scheming on camera, "and bear no resemblance to people living or dead." In this case, all you can say is amen."

=== Box office ===
According to Box Office India, the film had a good opening of 60 – 70% collections. At a few multiplexes, such as, Spice Noida, E Square Pune and Wave Ludhiana, the film almost opened at a 100% response. The film collected approximately ₹ 76.1 million net on its first day, according to Box Office India. It is the third biggest opener of the year at that time, following Ready and Yamla Pagla Deewana. The film had a strong Saturday, collecting ₹ 80.8 million net. The film's weekend collections amounted to ₹ 256.5 million net. The movie grossed ₹ 700 million worldwide. Box Office India finally declared it an "Average".

== Soundtrack ==
Double Dhamaal

Soundtrack album by Anand Raj Anand
- Released: 31 May 2011
- Genre: Film soundtrack
- Label: T-Series

Anand Raj Anand chronology
Bin Bulaye Baraati (2011)	Double Dhamaal (2011)	Chakradhaar (2012)

The music of the film was composed by Anand Raj Anand with lyrics penned by Mayur Puri and Anand Raj Anand. The music of the film was released on 31 May 2011. The soundtrack features the song "Oye Oye", a remake of the song "Tirchi Topiwale" from the 1989 film Tridev.

The song "Jalebi Bai" was later used by Canadian artist Tesher in his viral single "Jalebi Baby", the hook being incorporated with some lyrics borrowed from Justin Bieber's song "Yummy".

=== Track listing ===
No.	Title	Lyrics	Singer(s)	Length
1.	"Chal Kudiye"	Anand Raj Anand	Anand Raj Anand & Mika Singh	3:30
2.	"Chill Maar"	Mayur Puri	Mika Singh	3:19
3.	"Jalebi Bai"	Anand Raj Anand	Ritu Pathak, Anand Raj Anand	3:58
4.	"Oye Oye"	Anand Raj Anand	Sunidhi Chauhan	4:12
5.	"Chal Kudiye" (Remix)	Anand Raj Anand	Anand Raj Anand & Mika Singh	3:20
6.	"Chill Maaro" (Remix)	Mayur Puri	Mika Singh	2:50
7.	"Oye Oye" (Remix)	Anand Raj Anand	Sunidhi Chauhan	4:09

== Accolades ==
Award Ceremony	Category	Recipient	Result	Ref.(s)
4th Mirchi Music Awards	Best Item Song of the Year	"Jalebi Bai"	Nominated	

== Release ==
=== Home media ===
Double Dhamaal's DVD was released by Reliance Home Video. The television premiere was announced to be broadcast on Zee Cinema.

=== Distribution ===
The distribution rights were sold to Zee Entertainment Enterprises.

== Game ==
The release of the film was accompanied by a tie-in mobile video game which was distributed by Jump Games.

== Sequel ==
A sequel, and the third installment in the series, was announced after the release of Double Dhamaal, though the film was slammed by critics, and was a commercial success. Filming started in March 2012 and is set to release on 22 February 2019 under the title of Total Dhamaal. Director Indra Kumar has decided to do away with the female leads and bring back the entire cast from the hit film Dhamaal with one change.
