= Paritosh Painter =

Indian actor and film director (born 1972)

- Occupations: Actor; director; writer; producer
- Known for: Har Mushkil Ka Hal Akbar Birbal on BIG Magic
- Website: ideasentertainment.in

Paritosh Painter is an Indian theatre actor, director, and film, TV writer. He is the writer of several Bollywood movies, some of which are Total Dhamaal (2019), Dhamaal (2007), Paying Guests (2009), and All The Best: Fun Begins (2009).

== Career ==
Painter is active in the Indian theater scene, where he is known for writing and producing See No Evil, Hear No Evil, Speak No Evil, Get Rid of My Wife, and I Am The Best.

In 2018 he created and co-produced comedy web series, Baby Come Naa for Ekta Kapoor's OTT platform ALT Balaji starring Shreyas Talpade, Chunky Pandey, Kiku Sharda, Shefali Zariwala and Manasi Scott.

He also performs as a stand-up comedian with his show called Women Decoded.

== Films ==
Year	Film	Role	Producer	Language
2007	Dhamaal	Actor, writer	Indra Kumar – Maruti International	Hindi
2009	Paying Guests	Director, actor, writer	Mukta Arts	Hindi
2009	All The Best	Writer	Rohit Shetty – Ajay Devgan Productions	Hindi
2016	Santa Banta	Creative Advisor	-	Hindi
2017	Poster Boys	Writer	Shreyas Talpade – Sony	Hindi
2019	Total Dhamaal	Writer	Indra Kumar – Reliance Entertainment & Maruti (WIP)	Hindi
2022	Lochya Zala Re	Writer / Director / Producer	Ideas The Entertainment Company	Marathi
2023	Aflatoon	Writer / Director	Ideas The Entertainment Company	Marathi
2024	The Defective Detectives	Writer / Director	Rajeev Kumar Saha	English
2026	Dhamaal 4	Screenplay	Ajay Devgan, Bhushan Kumar	Hindi

== Television ==
TV Show	Role	Channel
Akbar ka bal Birbal	Writer / Creator	Star Bharat 2020
BOO SABKI PHATEGI	Producer - Webseries	Alt Balaji
MY NAME IJJ LAKHAN	Creator/Writer/ Producer	Sony Sab
Bagal waali Jaan Mareli	Producer	Zee Ganga
Baby Come Naa	Creator and producer Web series	ALT Balaji
Partners - Trouble ho gayi double	Creator and producer	SAB TV
Tenali Rama	Story, Screenplay, Dialogues	Sab TV
The Drama Company	Floor Director	Sony TV
Har Mushkil Ka Hal Akbar Birbal	writer / creator	Big Magic
Adaalat	Writer	Sony TV
CAMPUS	Actor	Zee TV
Challenge	Actor	Sony TV
Shagun	Actor	Star TV
Nadaniyaan	Writer	Big Magic
Magic's Kool	Creative Consultant & writer	POGO
Honge Judaa Na Hum	Producer, director, writer	Sony TV
Shree Adi Manav	Concept / Producer	SAB TV
Shree Tashi Sau	Concept / Producer	Zee Marathi
Home Sweet Home	Producer, director, writer	Zee Smile
Beach – O – Beach	Concept / Producer	Zee Next / Colors
Karishma – The Miracles Of Destiny	Concept / Producer	Sahara TV
Bookings Open	Concept / Producer	Sahara TV
Funjabi Chak De	Consultant	Start One

== Theatre ==
Play Name	Year	Role	Language
Whose Wife Is It Anyway?	1996	Actor, producer	English
Liar, Liar !!	1997	Actor, producer	English
Madhouse	1998	Actor, producer	English
I Do, I Don't	1999	Actor, producer, writer	English
I Love You Two	2000	Actor, producer, writer	English
Amar, Akbar, Ann, Tony	2001	Actor, producer, writer	English
Ek Se Bhale Do	2002	Director, writer, producer	Hindi
Uncle Samjha Karo	2004	Director, writer, producer	Hindi
Paying Guest	2005	Actor, director, writer, producer	Hindi
See No Evil, Hear No Evil, Speak No Evil	2006	Actor, director, writer, producer	English
Yeh Tedha Ghar, Yeh Medha Ghar	2007	Director, writer, producer	Hindi
Yeh Dil Maange More	2008	Director, writer, producer	Hindi
Yeh Kya Ho Raha Hai	2008	Director, writer, producer	Hindi
Kya Karen Control Nahin Hota	2008	Director, writer	Hindi
Oye Ki Girl Hai	2008	Director, writer	Hindi
See No Evil, Hear No Evil, Speak No Evil – Plot 2	2009	Actor, director, writer, producer	English
Get Rid Of My Wife	2010	Actor, director, writer	English
I Am The Best	2011	Actor, director, writer, producer	English
It's A Kind Of Magic – Comedy Store	2012	Actor, director, writer	English
WOMEN DECODED	2014	Actor, director, writer, producer	English
SELFIE	2016	Director, writer, producer	English & Hindi
Three Cheers	2019	Writer / Director / Actor	Hindi, English, Marathi
Ek Main Aur Ek Two	2024	Writer / Director	Hindi
Nathuram Godse Must Die	2024	Writer / Director	English ,Hindi ,Gujarati
Carry On Spying	2025	Writer / Director	English
Ananya	2025	Director	Hindi
Tom & Jerry	2026	Writer / Director	Hindi
Naqaab	2026	Writer/ Director	Hindi
Tansen	2026	Writer/Director	Hindi
