= Paying Guests =

2009 Indian film by Paritosh Painter

- Directed by: Paritosh Painter
- Written by: Paritosh Painter
- Based on: Joymakali Boarding by Sailesh Dey
- Produced by: Subhash Ghai; Raju Farooqui
- Starring: Shreyas Talpade; Vatsal Seth; Javed Jaffrey; Ashish Chaudhary; Celina Jaitly; Riya Sen; Neha Dhupia; Sayali Bhagat
- Cinematography: Selva Kumar
- Edited by: Manish More
- Music by: Sajid–Wajid
- Production company: Mukta Arts
- Release date: 19 June 2009
- Country: India
- Language: Hindi

Paying Guests is a 2009 Indian Hindi-language comedy drama film starring Ashish Chaudhary, Shreyas Talpade, Javed Jaffrey, Vatsal Seth, Celina Jaitly, Neha Dhupia, Riya Sen, Sayali Bhagat and Johnny Lever. It is a remake of the 1955 Bengali film Joy Maa Kali Boarding. It is directed by Paritosh Painter under Subhash Ghai's Mukta Arts banner. It is a comedy film revolving around four close friends who reside together in Pattaya.The film was a surprise box office success.The film was later remade in Punjabi as Mr & Mrs 420 (2014) which was also a box office success.

Shooting started in the second week of April 2008. Riya Sen was originally offered Neha Dhupia's role, Aarti Gupta, but declined and instead chose the role as Jayesh's melodramatic girlfriend, Alpita. A sequel, Paying Guests 2, is in production and will take place against the backdrop of a beauty pageant.

== Plot ==
Three friends—Bhavesh, Parag, and Pariksheet—live in Pattaya as paying guests in a house owned by Kiska Miglani. Bhavesh works as a chef in a restaurant called Namaste India, owned by Ballu Singh. Ballu has a younger brother, Ronnie, who wants ownership of the restaurant because he owes a considerable amount of money to a gangster, Murli. Parag is a screenwriter for a television channel, and Parikshit is a car salesman working for Aarti Gupta. Eventually all three of them lose their jobs. The three friends are later joined by Jayesh from Mumbai, who is a cousin of Parikshit's, and tells them that an apartment is included if he gets a job at an architecture firm. After getting drunk celebrating Jayesh's arrival, they privately insult Kiska, who arrives back home unexpectedly, hears what they are saying, and kicks them out. They go out in search of a place to stay, and a friend of Parikshit's suggests paid lodgings. Parikshit and Jayesh go to the home to find its owner is Ballu Singh, to whom they are oblivious of the fact that he is Bhavesh's former employer. Ballu and his wife, Sweety, agree to let them stay on one condition: they must be married.

Parag poses as Jayesh's wife, Kareena Kapoor, and Bhavesh as Karishma Kapoor, Parikshit's wife. Jayesh gets the job and will get the allotment to the flat in fifteen days' time. Ballu Singh and Sweety leave to pick up Sweety's sister, Kalpana. When they arrive home, Jayesh's girlfriend, Arpita, arrives with them and sees the four friends having (what she believes is) sex. She is instantly outraged at Jayesh and leaves him. Meanwhile, Parag seeks permission to marry Seema from her father, and Bhavesh, while wooing Kalpana, finds himself in a situation where Ronnie tries to rape Karishma Kapoor, and in the process of saving Bhavesh, Jayesh nearly drowns him by accident.

While discussing the event with Parag and Parikshit, he discovers the apple he has been eating has half a worm in it. Sweety hears Bhavesh vomit and mistakes him for someone being pregnant. In the meantime, Kanwarjit Paintal has agreed that Parag can marry Seema, Aarti has fallen for Parikshit, Kalpana has chosen Bhavesh as her life partner, and Jayesh has reconciled with Arpita. The four friends decide that it is time for them to tell Ballu and Sweety the truth. In a shopping centre, an accomplice of Ronnie's sees them and tells Ronnie.

When they come home, they find Ronnie, Ballu Singh, and Sweety there, but they do not know that anyone except the villain is there. Ronnie has persuaded Ballu to sign the papers transferring ownership of the restaurant; Bhavesh snatches the papers away, and they all end up in a theater showing of Mughal-e-Azam, where they all don various costumes and each make their own humorous attempts to retrieve the documents. Ballu gets back to the restaurant and forgives them on one condition: they give them the dream of a small child in the house, which they gladly set out to do.

== Cast ==
- Ashish Chaudhary as Parikshit Panday
- Shreyas Talpade as Bhavesh Verma / Karishma Kapoor
- Javed Jaffrey as Parag Melwani / Kareena Kapoor
- Vatsal Seth as Jayesh Thakur
- Celina Jaitly as Kalpana Singh
- Neha Dhupia as Aarti Gupta
- Riya Sen as Arpita
- Sayali Bhagat as Seema
- Johnny Lever as Ballu Singh
- Delnaaz Paul as Sweety Singh
- Chunky Panday as Ronnie
- Asrani as Kiska Miglani
- Inder Kumar as Murli
- Kanwarjit Paintal as Seema's Father

== Music ==
Paying Guests

Soundtrack album by Sajid–Wajid
- Released: 21 May 2009 (India)
- Genre: Feature film soundtrack
- Label: Junglee Music

Music is composed by Sajid–Wajid with lyrics provided by Jalees Sherwani, Wajid, A K Upadhyay.

Track listing
| No. | Title | Artist(s) | Length |
|---|---|---|---|
| 1. | "Jack & Jill" | Shaan, Earl D'Souza | 3:56 |
| 2. | "Jack & Jill" (remix) | Shaan, Earl D'Souza | 4:04 |
| 3. | "Nazar Se Nazaria" | Sunidhi Chauhan | 3:57 |
| 4. | "Nazar Se Nazaria" (remix) | Sunidhi Chauhan | 3:29 |
| 5. | "Paying Guests" | Wajid | 4:22 |
| 6. | "Ya Rabul Aalameen" | Sonu Nigam, Amrita Kak, Earl D'Souza | 4:31 |
