= Daddy Cool (2009 Hindi film) =

2009 Indian film by K. Murali Mohana Rao

- Theatrical Poster
- Directed by: K. Murali Mohana Rao
- Written by: Tushar Hiranandani
- Produced by: Indra Kumar; Ashok Thakeria
- Starring: Sunil Shetty; Javed Jaffrey; Aftab Shivdasani; Aarti Chabria; Ashish Chaudhary; Kim Sharma; Sophie Choudry; Rajpal Yadav; Tulip Joshi; Chunky Pandey; Prem Chopra
- Cinematography: T. Surendra Reddy
- Music by: Songs: Raghav Sachar; Adnan Sami; Background Score: Rajesh Rao
- Production companies: BIG Pictures; Maruti Pictures
- Distributed by: BIG Pictures
- Release date: 28 August 2009
- Running time: 101 minutes
- Country: India
- Language: Hindi

Daddy Cool is a 2009 Indian Hindi-language comedy film directed by K. Murali Mohana Rao. An official adaptation of the 2007 British-American comedy Death at a Funeral, the film stars Sunil Shetty, Jaaved Jaaferi, Aashish Chaudhary, Aftab Shivdasani and Aarti Chabria, and borrows its title from the song of the same name by the disco group Boney M., whose adaptation also serves as the film's title track.

== Plot ==
The film is set in Goa and follows what happens on one crazy day. The story focuses on Steven and his wife Nancy, who currently live with Steven's mother and plan to purchase their own flat soon. The film begins with the death of Steven's father. Steven organises the whole funeral by himself, and the guests begin to arrive. Steven's brother Brian, a renowned novelist living in Mumbai, also arrives. Everyone is expecting Brian to give the farewell speech since he is a novelist; however, he has nothing planned, and he intends for Steven to do the speech. Every time Steven tries to start his speech, someone always interrupts, and the speech is delayed. A short man named Andrew introduces himself to Steven and asks to speak to him in private. Andrew tells him that he was Steven's father's gay lover. Surprised, Steven tells Brian this. Andrew blackmails them and demands money to keep this a secret. By this time, Steven's crazy family had arrived.

== Cast ==
- Sunil Shetty as Steven
- Jaaved Jaffrey as Carlos
- Ashish Chaudhary as Brian
- Aftab Shivdasani as Michael
- Rajpal Yadav as Andrew Symonds
- Aarti Chabria as Nancy
- Tulip Joshi as Maria
- Chunky Pandey as Harry
- Prem Chopra as Uncle Murphy
- Kim Sharma as Jenny
- Sophie Chaudhry as Ayesha
- Vrajesh Hirjee as Jim
- Sharat Saxena as Douglas
- Vijay Patkar as real estate agent
- Chacha Chaudhary as 'wrong dead body'
- Nassar Abdulla as Maria's father
- Yusuf Hussain as Catholic priest
- Adi Irani as Mr. Carlos
- Dinesh Lamba as 'Coffin with Karan' man

== Music ==
Daddy Cool

Soundtrack album by Raghav Sachar
- Genre: Feature film soundtrack

The music was composed by Raghav Sachar and guest songwriters Farhad-Sajid on the song Life Life sung by Farhad, who also penned the song. The lyrics were provided by Aditya Dhar and Prashant Ingole. The title song "Daddy Cool", written by Dhar and composed by Sachar was based on the Boney M. song of the same name.

Track list
No.	Title	Artist(s)	Length
1.	"Daddy Cool"	Raghav Sachar & Paroma P. Das Gupta	3:41
2.	"Nasha Nasha"	Neha Bhasin	3:47
3.	"Life Life"	Farhad	4:28
4.	"Nasha Nasha" (remix)	Neha Bhasin	3:57
5.	"Daddy Cool" (remix)	Raghav Sachar & Paroma P. Das Gupta	3:07

== Reception ==
Patcy N from Rediff.com gave the film 1.5 stars out of 5, praising its music and the makers' acknowledging of its source material, but feeling that some of the comedy was not suited for the culture of India, a country where last rites are a serious matter, and that the single-location setting could get boring after a point. Taran Adarsh from Bollywood Hungama gave the film 1 star out of 5, feeling the concept was more suited for a play, and found the humour "crass and crude". Shubhra Gupta from Indian Express also gave the film 1 star out of 5, remarking that while it was an official remake of Death At A Funeral, it was full of "gags that sag after the first two uses."
