= Subhro Ganguly =

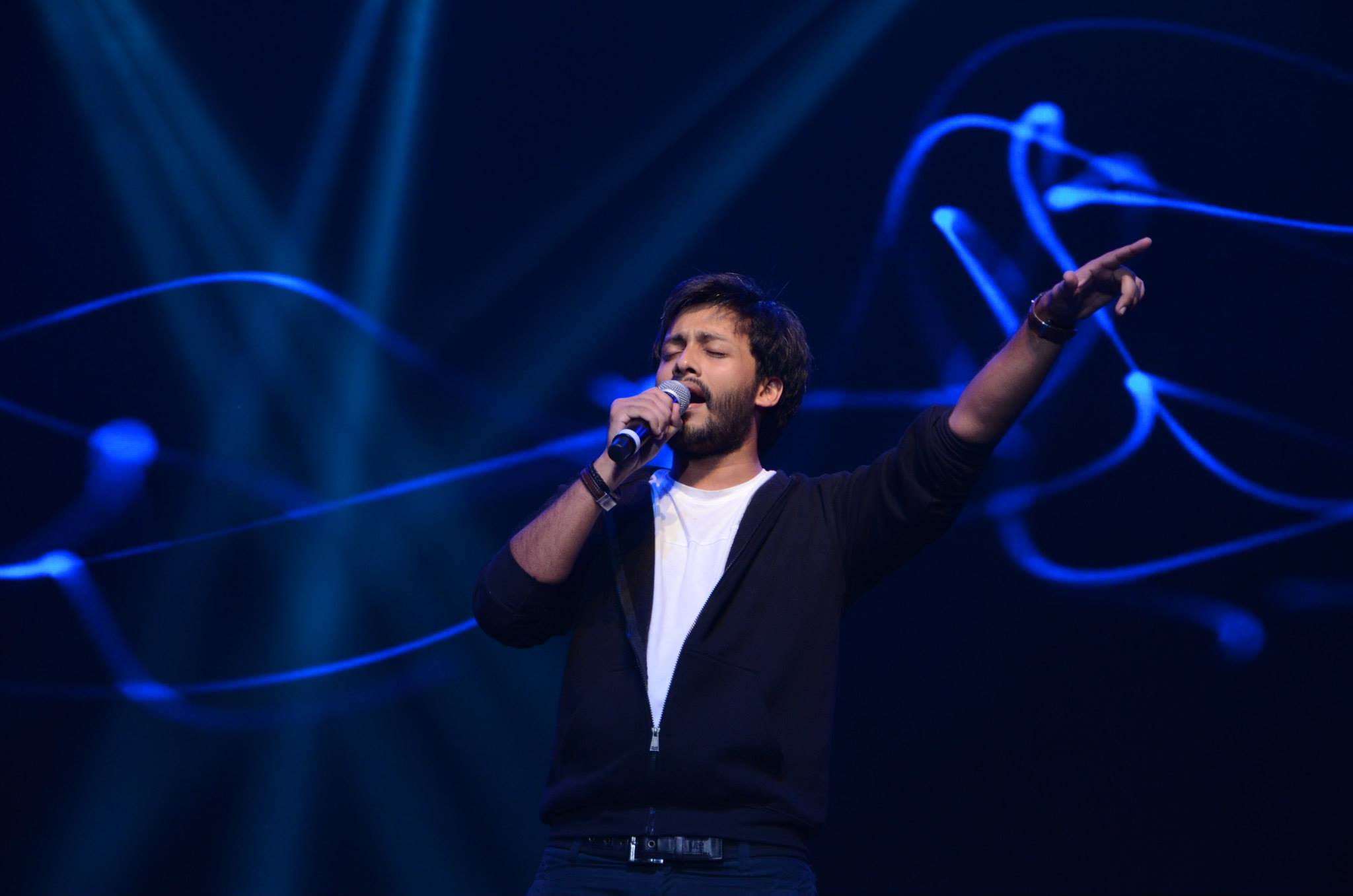

Background information
- Born: Kolkata, West Bengal, India
- Origin: West Bengal, India
- Genres: Bollywood
- Occupation: Singer
- Years active: 2017–present

Subhro J Ganguly is a Bollywood singer and composer who has sung the songs Paisa Yeh Paisa and Mungda for the movie Total Dhamaal. His music video single Dil Zara Tu Sunn was released by Zee Music in 2017.

It featured him with Raveena Taurani and was composed by Sachin Gupta and directed by Kookie Gulati.

== Early life and education ==
Subhro hails from Kolkata . He began his education from The Doon School, Dehradun and later attended college at St Xavier's College, Mumbai.

== Career ==
He got his break as a composer by composing the title song along with Raju Singh for the television show – Mission Sapne that aired on Colors. It had various celebrities like Salman Khan, Karan Johar, Varun Dhawan.

The song was sung by Mika Singh where he won best singer award at ITA. (Indian Television Awards) 2015.

He recently composed the Title track for Femina Miss India 2018

Subhro began his live performances by winning a competition where he got to open for Arijit Singh in 2015.

He later got a chance to perform at MTV Bollyland with Mika Singh, Sukhwinder Singh and many others.

He now has performed in many cities like in India and across the world.
