= Vijay Patkar =

Indian actor and director (born 1963)

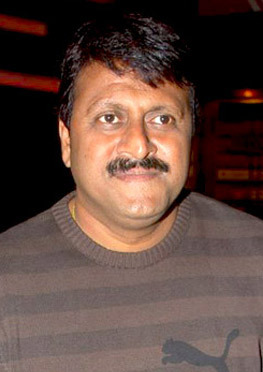
- Patkar at the audio release of Daddy Cool in 2009
- Born: 29 May 1963 (age 63); Mumbai, Maharashtra, India
- Occupations: Actor, director
- Years active: 1988–present
- Political party: Nationalist Congress Party

Vijay Patkar (born 29 May 1963) is an Indian theatre, television, Marathi film and Bollywood actor.

He is known for his comic roles in films including Tezaab, Apna Sapna Money Money, Golmaal 3, Tees Maar Khan, Daddy Cool, All the Best: Fun Begins and Singham.

Patkar is the president of Akhil Bharatiya Marathi Chitrapat Mahamandal (ABMCM).

== Personal life ==
Patkar was brought up in Girgaon, Mumbai. He completed his education in Union High School and Siddharth College of Arts, Science and Commerce. Later, he had a job in Bank of India through Artiste's quota.

He has one brother, Dayal Patkar.

== Career ==
Patkar started acting in college with the one-act play Majhi Pehli Chori (My First Theft).

In 1988, director N. Chandra gave him his first film role, as Anil Kapoor's friend, in the action romance Tezaab. Patkar continued to work in theatre, Marathi movies and television advertisements. He has been greatly influenced by Charlie Chaplin. It reflects in his television commercials.

He won an International Indian Film Academy Award for best model for his Cello Tape television commercial. He also won the award of Marathi Natya Parishad for his play Halka Fulka Natak.

In 2006, he directed and produced the Marathi movie Ek Unad Diwas. In 2012, he directed the movie Riwayat, on female foeticide in India. In 2012, Patkar directed and produced the Marathi-language movie Laavu Ka Laath.

As of April 2013, Patkar had directed seven films and produced three.

== Filmography ==
Key
†	Denotes films that have not yet been released

=== As actor ===
Year	Title	Role	Notes
2026	Dhamaal 4 †	Jheenga	
2026	Bhagubai		Marathi film
2025	ReelStar		Marathi film
2024	Navra Maza Navsacha 2	Inspector Haatware	Marathi film
2023	Chhapa Kata	Sameer’s maternal uncle	Marathi film
2023	Rules Ranjann	Tukaram	Telugu film
2023	Hume Toh Loot Liya		
2022	Cirkus	Shankar	
2020	Taish	Babu	
2019	Dhamaal 3	Inspector Vijay Patkar	
2018	Simmba	Alok Borkar	
2018	Aa Ba Ka	Peon	
2017	Golmaal Again	Constable Gandhari	
2014	Indian Premacha Lafda		
2014	Super Nani	Movie Director	
2014	Premasathi Coming Suun	Mama	Marathi film
2013	R... Rajkumar	Chatur Singh	
2012	Chhodo Kal Ki Baatein	Dhobi Ramsharan	
2011	Singham	Havaldar Ramesh Kelkar	
2011	Masti Express	Pappu	
2010	Tees Maar Khan	S.I. Jagtap	
2010	Golmaal 3	Havaldar Gandhari	
2010	Jaane Kahan Se Aayi Hai	Waiter	
2010	Right Yaaa Wrong	Police Inspector	
2009	Fruit & Nut	Clint	
2009	All the Best: Fun Begins	Goli	
2009	Wanted	Ganesh	
2009	Daddy Cool	Pinto - Real Estate Agent	
2009	Lagnachi Varat Londonchya Gharat	Supporting	
2008	Maan Gaye Mughal-e-Azam		
2007	Ek Krantiveer: Vasudev Balwant Phadke		
2007	Dhamaal	Air traffic controller	
2007	God Only Knows!	Yumdoot	
2007	Maherchi Maaya		
2007	Salaam Bacche	Havaldar Murlidhar	
2006	Baabul	Peon at Eros Jewelry	
2006	Apna Sapna Money Money		
2006	Pahili Sher, Dusri Savvasher, Navara Pavsher		
2005	Kyaa Kool Hai Hum	Inspector/Havaldar	
2004	Navra Mazha Navsacha	Dumb passenger/ Inspector	
2003	Raghu Romeo	Hari	
1994	Majha Chakula		Marathi film
1991	Narsimha	Narsimha's ally #2	
1989	Bhutacha Bhau	Ward boy	Marathi film
1988	Tezaab	Munna's friend	

=== As director ===
Year	Title
2016	Mohar
2015	Carry On Deshpande
2012	Riwayat
2011	Sagla Karun Bhagle
2008	Sasu Numbari Jawai Dus Numbari
2006	Chashme Bahaddar
2006	Ek Unaad Divas

=== Television ===
- Don't Worry Ho Jayega (2002) as Ramesh

== See also ==
- List of film directors
- List of film producers
- List of Indian actors
- List of people from Mumbai
