= Human chain =

Human chain may refer to:

- Bucket brigade, a method for transporting items by passing them from hand to hand
- Human chain (politics), a form of social expression
- Human Chain (poetry collection), a poetry collection by Seamus Heaney
- Human Chain (band), a British jazz ensemble
