= Jaaved Jaaferi =

Indian film actor, dancer, hip hop artist and comedian (born 1962)

Jaaved Jaferi
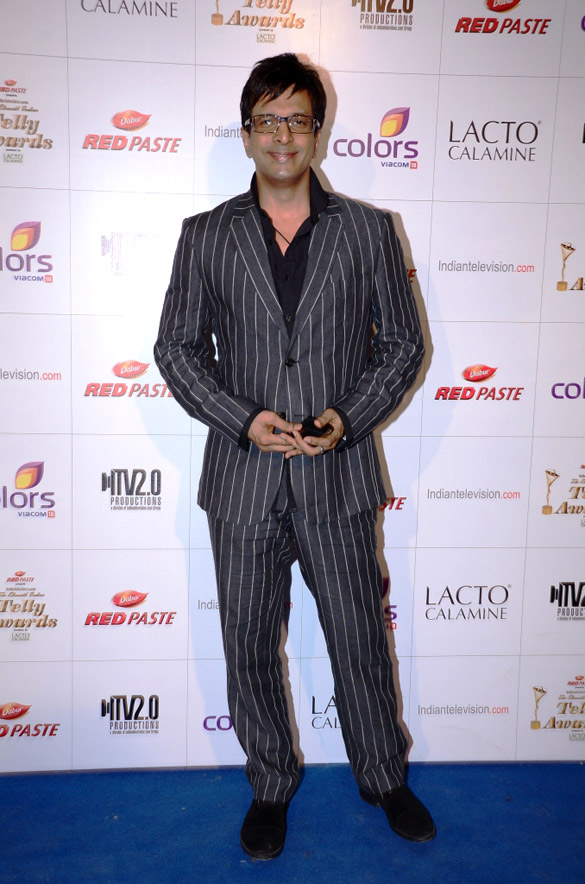
- Jaffrey in 2012
- Pronunciation: [d͡ʒɑːʋɛd̪ d͡ʒɑːfɾiː]
- Born: Syed Jaaved Ahmed Jaffrey; 4 December 1962 (age 63); Bombay, Maharashtra, India (present-day Mumbai)
- Other name: Javed Jaffrey
- Occupations: Actor; Film producer; Dancer; Comedian; Politician
- Years active: 1985–present
- Political party: Aam Aadmi Party
- Spouse: Zeba Bakhtiar (m. 1989; div. 1990) Habiba Jaffrey (m. 1991)
- Children: 3 (including Meezaan Jafri)
- Father: Jagdeep

Syed Jaaved Ahmed Jaffrey (Hindustani pronunciation: [d͡ʒɑːʋɛd̪ d͡ʒɑːfɾiː]; born 4 December 1962) is an Indian actor, dancer, producer and comedian who has appeared in Hindi films and television shows. He is the son of the comedian Jagdeep. He joined the Aam Aadmi Party (AAP) in March 2014 and contested the 2014 Indian general election from the Lucknow constituency finishing fifth.

Jaffrey has been awarded the life membership of International Film And Television Club of Asian Academy of Film & Television. He was also the brand ambassador of the first India International Animation and Cartoon Film festival 2015.

== Early life and education ==
Jaffrey is the son of comedian Jagdeep. He was born in Bombay, Maharashtra, India (present-day Mumbai).

He participated in school dance competitions at St. Theresa's, and later while studying psychology at National College (his parents discouraged him from attending St. Xavier's, fearing it would make him "go wild"). In 1983, he won an all-India dance competition that awarded him training at a London dance school, which cemented his career in dance.

He married Habiba Jaffrey in 1991 and has a daughter and two sons, including actor Meezaan.

== Media career ==
=== Films ===
The film Meri Jung, released in 1985, gave him his first opportunity to enact the role of a villain and showcase his dancing powers on screen.

He won his first IIFA Award for best comic role in Salaam Namaste in 2005.

In 2008, he played Charlie Anna in the animated film Roadside Romeo, a collaborative effort of Yash Raj Films and Disney.

He has produced or co-produced films and documentaries such as Inshallah, Football and Inshallah, Kashmir.

=== Television ===
The launch of cable TV in the 1990s, particularly Channel [V] and its irreverent sense of humour, gave him a niche to depict his brand of comedy. He has been called "TVdom's first real superstar".

He has also appeared in the Pakistani programme Loose Talk in the early 2000s, portraying various characters from India.

==== Advertising industry ====
He has been associated with advertising since the 1980s as an actor, copywriter and producer. He has appeared in the comical Maggi Hot & Sweet Sauce commercials for 25 years.

==== Host and judge ====
He has commentated on the Japanese TV show Takeshi's Castle and Ninja Warrior on Pogo TV and Hungama respectively. He was also the judge for Karaoke World Championships India with Manasi Scott, music director Raju Singh, Salim Merchant, Sulaiman Merchant, founder and organizer of KWC INDIA, Savio Paul D'sa, Leslie Lewis, Remo Fernandes, and Sunita Rao.

Jaffrey has hosted award shows including Filmfare, Zee Cine Awards, and IIFA.

Jaffrey hosted Big Googly on BIG 92.7FM created with Paritosh Painter. He also hosted Once More, where he talks about Bollywood films from the 1970s to the 1990s in his comic style, on Epic channel since 2015.

He anchored the show Flashback. Jaffrey also anchored the song programme, Timex Timepass, in which he shifted between the caricatures of characters.

From 1996 to 2014 he hosted the dance competition show Boogie Woogie on Sony Entertainment Television Asia with his brother Naved Jaffery and friend Ravi Behl.

== Political career ==
Jaffrey contested the 2014 Lok Sabha Elections from Lucknow as a candidate of Aam Aadmi Party but lost to BJP's Rajnath Singh. He had finished fifth in the constituency securing 41,429 votes.

== Filmography ==
Key
†	Denotes films that have not yet been released

=== Films ===
Year	Title	Role	Notes
1985	Meri Jung	Vikram Thakral aka Vicky	Also singer for song "Bol Baby Bol Rock-N-Roll"
1987	7 Saal Baad	Ravi	
1988	Woh Phir Aayegi	Mukesh	
1989	Lashkar	Johnny	
1990	Jawani Zindabad	Ravi Verma	
1991	Shiv Ram	Javed	
1991	100 Days	Sunil	
1992	Jeena Marna Tere Sang	Vijay	
1992	Tahalka	Captain Javed	
1992	Karm Yodha	Sudhir	
1993	Zakhmi Rooh	Shekhar	
1994	Teesra Kaun	Sanjay Chopra / Pankaj Nigam	
1995	Oh Darling! Yeh Hai India	Prince of Don	
1995	Rock Dancer	JJ	
1996	Fire	Jatin	
1998	Bombay Boys	Cameo	Also singer and lyricist for song "Mumbhai"
1998	Hanuman	Ashok	
2000	Gang	Gary Rozario	
2003	Aman Ke Farishtey	Amar	
2003	Main Prem Ki Diwani Hoon	Himself	Special appearance
2003	Jajantaram Mamantaram	Aditya Pandit	
2003	Boom	Boom Shankar aka Boom Boom	
2005	Salaam Namaste	Jaggu Yadav Aka Crocodile Dundee	
2007	Ta Ra Rum Pum	Harry	
2007	Dhamaal	Manav Shrivastav	
2007	Victoria No. 203	Bobby 'BB' Bombatta	
2008	Shaurya	Major Akash Kapoor	
2008	Singh Is Kinng	Mika Singh	
2008	Roadside Romeo	Charlie Anna	Voiceover
2009	3 Idiots	Real Ranchoddas Shamaldas Chanchad	Cameo appearance
2009	Dhoondte Reh Jaaoge!	Salim	
2009	8 x 10 Tasveer	Habibullah Happi Pasha	
2009	Kambakkht Ishq	Keswani	
2009	Paying Guests	Parag Melwani	
2009	The Forest	Ebishek	
2009	Daddy Cool	Carlos	
2009	City of Life	Suresh Khan	
2010	Lafangey Parindey	Himself	Special appearance
2010	Hello Darling	Hardik	
2011	Loot	Akbar	
2011	Double Dhamaal	Manav Shrivastav	
2011	Inshallah, Football	—	Producer; Documentary film
2012	Inshallah, Kashmir	—	Producer; Documentary film
2012	Agent Vinod	—	Playback singer for song "Pyaar ki Pungi"
2013	Besharam	Bheem Singh Chandel	
2013	War Chhod Na Yaar	Captain Qureshi	
2014	Mr Joe B. Carvalho	Carlos	
2014	Bang Bang!	Hamid Gul	
2015	Picket 43	Mushraff Khan	Malayalam film
2016	Ishq Forever	Amitabh	
2018	Lupt	Harsh Tandon	
2019	Total Dhamaal	Manav Shrivastav	
2019	Happy Sardar	Inderpal Singh	Malayalam film
2019	Jabariya Jodi	Hukum Dev Singh	
2019	De De Pyaar De	Samir Khanna	Cameo
2019	Bala	Bachchan Dubey	
2020	Maska	Rustom Irani	Netflix film
2020	Coolie No. 1	Jai Kishen/ Jackson	Amazon Prime Video film
2021	Bhoot Police	Chhedilal	
2021	Sooryavanshi	Kabir Shroff	
2022	Jaadugar	Pradeep Narang	Netflix film
2025	Inn Galiyon Mein	Mirza	
2025	De De Pyaar De 2	Ronak Molta	
2026	Mayasabha – The Hall of Illusion	Parmeshwar Khanna	
2026	Dhamaal 4	Manav Srivastav	

=== Television ===
Year	Title	Role	Notes
1993	Mr. Shrimati	Sanju	Television film
1993	Zabaan Sambhalke	Rocky Patel	Guest
1994–1997	Flashback	Host/presenter	
1995	Kash-m-kash	Dilbagh	
1996–2014	Boogie Woogie	Judge	
2004	Road Raja	Host	
2005	Kaboom	Judge	
2005–2006	Bam Bam Bam Gir Pade Hum	Host/presenter	
2011–2012	Mai Ka Lal	Host	
2014	Once More With Jaaved Jaaferi	Host	
2015	Back to Flashback	Host	
2019	The Final Call	Siddharth Singhaniya	
2020–2022	Never Kiss Your Best Friend	Bittu	
2022	Escaype Live	Ravi Gupta	
2024	Mohrey	Bosco	
2024	Taaza Khabar	Yusuf Akhtar	
2025	Do You Wanna Partner	Dylan Thomas	

== Dubbing roles ==
=== Animated films and shows ===
Film Title	Original Voice(s)	Character(s)	Dub Language	Original Language	Original Year Release	Dub Year Release	Notes
The Jungle Book 2	Tony Jay	Shere Khan	Hindi	English	2003	2003	
The Incredibles	Jason Lee	Buddy; Pine / Syndrome	Hindi	English	2004	2004	The Hindi dub released as "Hum Hain Lajawab".

=== Live action series ===
Title	Actor(s)	Character(s)	Dub language	Original language	Original year release	Dub year release	Channel/network	Notes
Takeshi's Castle	Shizuo Miyauchi Runpei Masui	Narrator	Hindi	Japanese	1986–1990	2005–2019	Pogo	
Ninja Warrior	Takashi Matsuo	Narrator	Hindi	Japanese	1997	2013	Hungama TV	
Floor Is Lava	Rutledge Wood	Narrator	Hindi	English	2020	2021	Netflix	

== Awards and nominations ==
- Won, IIFA Best Comedian Award for Salaam Namaste (2006)
- Nominated, Filmfare Award for Best Performance in a Comic Role: Salaam Namaste (2006)
- Won, National Film Award for Best Film on Social Issues: Inshaallah, Football (2011)- As a producer
- Nominated, Best Entertainment Presenter/Host, Animals Gone Wild with Jaaved Jaaferi, 26th Asian Television Awards
