= Anjali Anand =

Indian actress (born 1992)

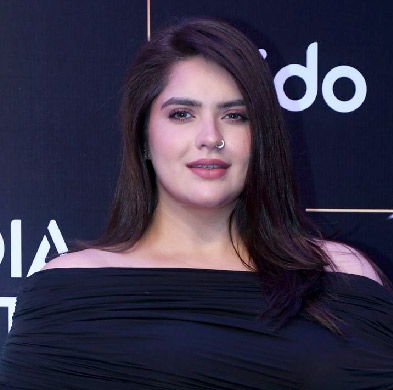
- Anand in 2024
- Born: 9 October 1993 (age 33); Mumbai, Maharashtra, India
- Occupation: Actress
- Years active: 2017–present
- Known for: Kullfi Kumarr Bajewala, Rocky Aur Rani Kii Prem Kahaani

Anjali Dinesh Anand (born 12 June 1992) is an Indian actress and dancer who primarily works in Hindi television and movies. She is known for her lead roles in the Star Plus's television shows like Dhhai Kilo Prem, and Kullfi Kumarr Bajewala which earned her major recognition. She made her Hindi film debut with the Dharma Productions film Rocky Aur Rani Kii Prem Kahaani directed by Karan Johar.

Anand made her acting debut with 2017 web-series Untag. She is also seen as contestant in stunt-based reality show Fear Factor: Khatron Ke Khiladi season 13.

== Early life ==
Anjali Anand was born on 12 June 1992 in Mumbai, Maharashtra. She is the daughter of former actor Dinesh Anand.

== Career ==
Anand made her acting debut with the web series Untag in 2017.

Anand played the lead in the television shows Dhhai Kilo Prem in 2017 and Kullfi Kumarr Bajewala in 2018.

In 2023, Anand appeared in the reality show Fear Factor: Khatron Ke Khiladi season 13 as a contestant. She also made bollywood debut in 2023 with Karan Johar's film Rocky Aur Rani Kii Prem Kahaani. She also appeared in dance reality show Jhalak Dikhhla Jaa (season 11) and got evicted after 11 weeks.

== Filmography ==
=== Films ===
Key
†	Denotes films that have not yet been released

Year	Title	Role	Notes	Ref.
2021	Bell Bottom	Anshul's sister-in-law	Uncredited	
2023	Rocky Aur Rani Kii Prem Kahaani	Gayatri Randhawa		
2025	Bun Tikki	TBA	Premiere at 36th (PSIFF)	
2026	Dhamaal 4	Paaro		

=== Television ===
Year	Title	Role	Notes	Ref.
2017	Dhhai Kilo Prem	Dipika Sharma		
2017	Untag	Shikha Suri		
2018–2020	Kullfi Kumarr Bajewala	Loveleen Chaddha Singh Gill		
2023	Fear Factor: Khatron Ke Khiladi 13	Contestant	12th place	
2023–2024	Jhalak Dikhhla Jaa 11	Contestant	10th place	

=== Web series ===
Year	Title	Role	Notes	Ref.
2024	Raat Jawaan Hai	Radhika	SonyLIV	
2025	Dabba Cartel	Shahida	Netflix	
