= Nilkamal Singh =

Indian singer

Neelkamal Singh
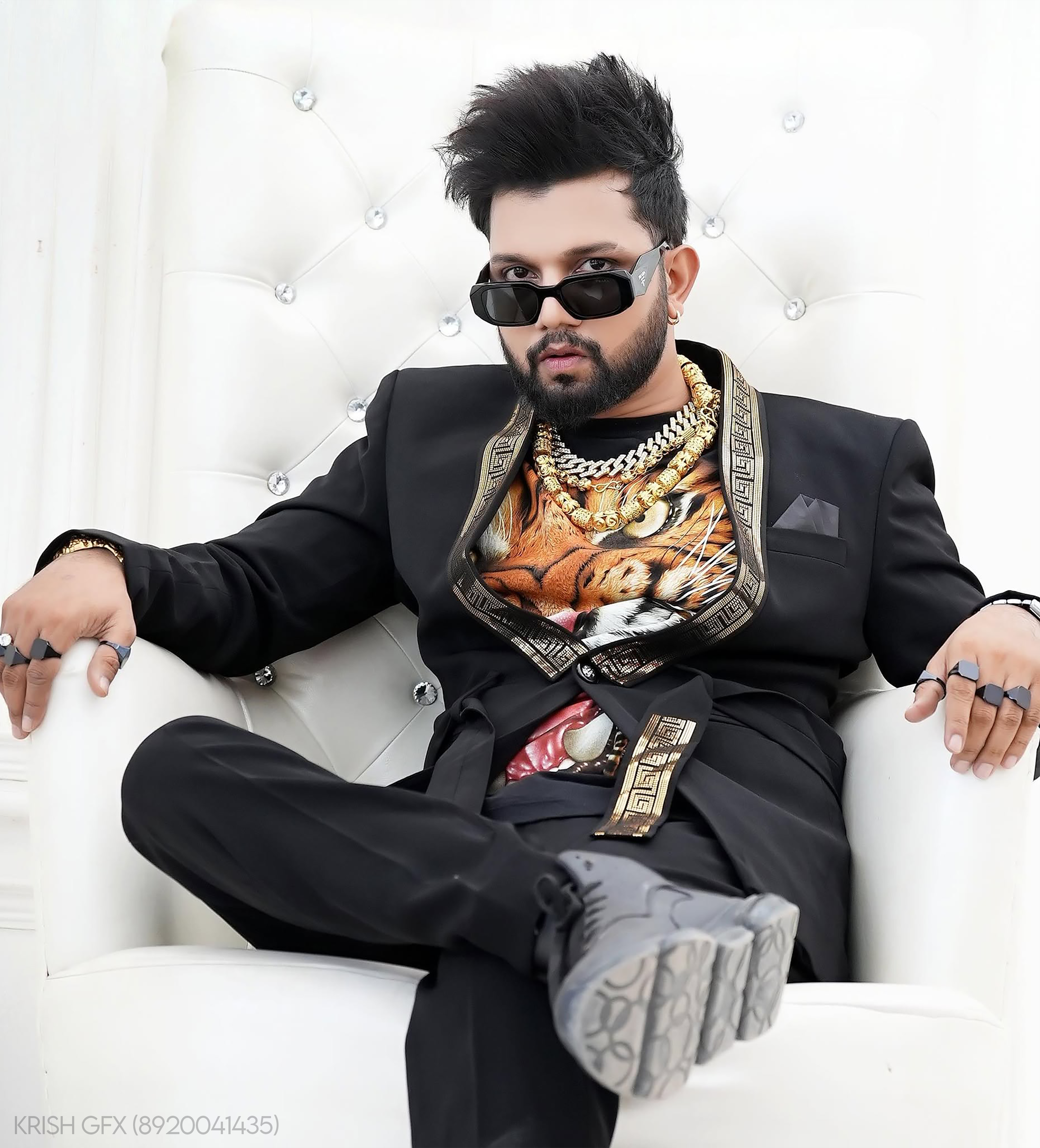
- Neelkamal posing for a photograph in 2026

Background information
- Occupations: Actor; singer; dancer
- Years active: 2003–present

Neelkamal Singh Kushwaha is an Indian singer who primarily works in the Bhojpuri music industry. In December 2022, his song Judai is said to have gained more viewership, leaving behind the Lal Ghagra of Pawan Singh for a long period of time after release, which led to his inclusion among the notable Bhojpuri singers of the industry. A resident of Buxar, Bihar, Singh started his career in 2003. He was one of the participant in the music reality show Sur Sangram, where he was eliminated after reaching the top four. According to media reports, his networth is somewhere around 140 million.

== Musical career ==
In 2021, Singh, along with Bhojpuri singer Priyanka Singh, recorded the song Ja Ab Palat Ke Dekhab Na, which surpassed 50 million views on YouTube. In this song, he worked with Bhojpuri actress Kajal Raghwani. In the same year, he also recorded his music video Ketna Ke Khush Karbu featuring Trisha Kar Madhu. He has also worked with actress Sanjana Mishra in Heroine song in 2023. In the same year, Singh released Holi me maja Milab na poora, in which he was featured with Shristi Uttrakhandi.

In 2022, he recorded Kamayi Bahaela Pani Me, in which he appeared along with the actress Zoya Khan. This song was sung by Singh with Shilpi Raj, written by Ashutosh Tiwari. With Shristi Uttrakhandi, he recorded numerous other songs like Sardi Se Kaptani (2021), Bagalwali (2021), Jan Tohar Mammi Kasam (2021), Kakari Ke Bhatiya (2022), Du Du Go Marad (2022), Mela Aai Jija Bahre Bahre (2022), Kabo Khushi Kabo Gam Di (2022), Chhot Lage Devara (2023), Holi Me Gor Laage Devara (2023).

In 2023, Singh released Lebu Ka Debu, in which he worked with Shweta Sharma. In 2023, he recorded 'Kalsha Diyariya Lele Aayi' song with Bhojpuri singer Shiwani Singh, which was based on Navrati festival of Bihar. Singh also appeared with Namrata Malla in Jawani Kya Achar Dalogi 2.0 (2023) music video. This song was written by Ashutosh Tiwari. Within six-day after its release, this song crossed over five million views on YouTube.

In 2021, he released his song Hoi Pyar Na Dobara with Aadishakti Films. This song was liked by the viewers and within few hours of its release, it was viewed by millions. It was reported that, this song succeeded his another song Pyar Me Bapwa Diwar Bhail Ba.

In 2023, in the beginning of year, Singh released three songs in sequence. These songs were, Beer Se Nahail Goriya (sung by Singh with Bhojpuri singer Anupama Yadav), Dhokebaj and Janaja. Some of Singhs' songs have surpassed 200 million views. This includes, Laika Tohre Ke Papa Kahata, released in 2021, in which he was featured with Trisha Kar Madhu. Earlier, Madhu came into limelight after her personal videos went viral. This song was written by Ashutosh Tiwari.

Singh has also worked with Bhojpuri actress Saba Khan. They were seen together in music video Badmash Bade Hamar Hokhewala Jija and Mohabbat Pe Bhari Naukri Sarkari.

Singh, later released "Paisa Na Kaudi Bazaar Kare Chhori."

== Controversies ==
In 2021, Singh was embroiled in a controversy, when he reportedly sung a vulgar song which went viral. In this song, Singh is said to have commented on Bhojpuri actress Akshara Singh. Akshara took to social media to reply Singh for this song. Later, Akshara filed a case on Singh in Kankarbagh Police Station, Patna.

== Music tracks ==
Title	Length	Lyrics	Music	Year	Notes
Kuware Rahab	4:31	Ashutosh Tiwari	Shivshakti Raj	2023	
