= Esha Gupta =

Indian actress and model (born 1985)

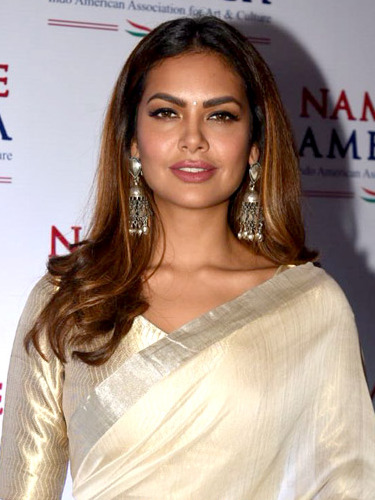
- Gupta in 2017
- Born: 28 November 1985 (age 40); New Delhi, India
- Beauty pageant titleholder
- Years active: 2012–present
- Major competitions: Femina Miss India 2007; Miss International 2007
- Website: www.eshaguptaofficial.com

Esha Gupta (/ˈiːʃə ˈɡʊptə/; born 28 November 1985) is an Indian actress, model, and beauty pageant titleholder. She works in Hindi films. She was crowned Femina Miss India International 2007 and represented India at Miss International 2007. She made her acting debut with the crime thriller Jannat 2 (2012) receiving a Filmfare Award for Best Female Debut nomination.

Gupta entered the Femina Miss India contest in 2007, where she placed third and won the Miss India International title and later represented India at the Miss International pageant. Post her debut, Gupta has received praises for her portrayal in the political drama Chakravyuh (2012), but her performance in the comedy film Humshakals (2014) met with negative reviews. Her highest-grossing releases came with the horror thriller Raaz 3D (2013), the crime drama Rustom (2016), and the action-adventure Baadshaho (2017).

== Early life and work ==
Esha Gupta was born on 28 November 1985 in New Delhi. Her father is a retired Air Force officer and her mother is a homemaker. She has a sister named Neha. She spent most of her childhood in Dehradun, Hyderabad and Delhi. Gupta completed her graduation in mass communication from the School of Communication, Manipal University, Manipal.

Gupta participated in Femina Miss India in 2007, where she won Miss Photogenic and came in 3rd to go on to compete in Miss India International. She featured in the Kingfisher Calendar in 2010. Later she pursued a career in Bollywood.

== Career ==
=== Debut and early work (2012–2017) ===
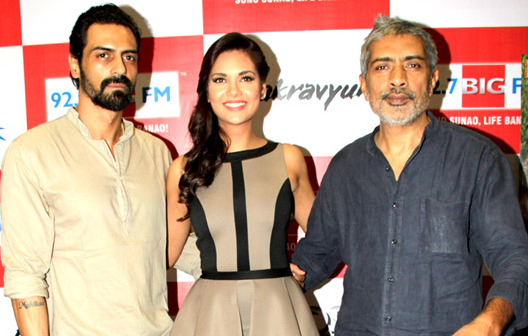
Gupta at an event in 2014

Gupta made her Bollywood debut with Mahesh Bhatt's Jannat 2 in 2012 opposite Emraan Hashmi in the lead role. For her debut performance, Taran Adarsh of Bollywood Hungama said, "Debutante Esha Gupta enchants you with her captivating charm. She appears a tad unrefined at places, nonetheless she handles her part assertively." Martin D'Souza of Glam Sham wrote, "As for the debutante, Esha Gupta, I guess she may have to enroll herself into an acting school." Gaurav Malani stated, "Esha Gupta, who looks a mix between Lara Dutta and Isha Koppikar, is merely there for the glam quotient." The film was a success at the box office, earning ₹430 million (US$4.6 million) domestically and thus brought in more recognition for Gupta. Later, Gupta signed Vikram Bhatt's Raaz 3D alongside her Jannat 2 co-star, Emraan Hashmi and Bipasha Basu, Gupta received mixed reviews from critics for her acting prowess, film critic Komal Nahta noted, "Esha Gupta is stiff as Sanjana but does much better towards the end (when she almost goes berserk)". India Today wrote, "Both Bipasha and Esha get liberal scope to show off booty. A Bhatt film where the heroines don't get to flaunt it is unimaginable, after all, Bipasha looks hot in her starring role but Esha reveals a few raw edges". Raaz 3D performed well at box office within first three days of its release with collections in the vicinity of 360 million. Her third film of the year, Chakravyuh, was invited to premiere at London Film Festival. Sukanya Verma noted, "Esha's character makes zero contribution to whatever scenes she has."

Gupta appeared in a cameo in Gori Tere Pyaar Mein. In 2014, she was seen in Sajid Khan's Humshakals alongside Saif Ali Khan, Riteish Deshmukh, Bipasha Basu and Tamannaah. Box Office India declared it a "disaster". Gupta played a high society woman in the 2016 film Rustom. It became a box office success grossing over ₹210 crore (US$26 million) worldwide. Mumbai Mirror stated, "Gupta steals the show (unintentionally) with her OTT makeup and her misplaced expressions." Gupta had three releases in 2017. She played the main antagonist in action film Commando 2, which was a moderate box-office success. She then appeared in Baadshaho opposite Hashmi, in their third film together. She then made her Telugu and Tamil debut with the bilingual film Veedevadu.

=== Further career and expansion (2018–present) ===
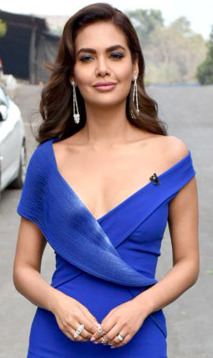
Gupta at the sets of High Fever… Dance Ka Naya Tevar in 2018

Gupta played an officer' wife in J.P. Dutta's Paltan in 2018 opposite Arjun Rampal. Hindustan Times termed her "blissfully blank". She also made her television debut as a judge with & TV's High Fever — Dance Ka Naya Tevar in 2018. In 2019, she had a cameo in comedy film Total Dhamaal. The film grossed ₹200 crore (US$28 million) worldwide in twelve days of release, and was one of the highest grossing Bollywood films of 2019. The same year, she played DCP in One Day: Justice Delivered alongside Anupam Kher. Shubhra Gupta of Indian Express noted, "Esha Gupta's portrayal as a tough crime branch officer took away the 'credibility of the film' whatever it had."

Gupta expanded to web shows in 2020. She made her web debut with RejctX's second season. She then appeared in Nakaab in 2021. In 2022, she played Bobby Deol's image-maker in the third season of Indian Hindi-language crime drama web series Aashram. Hindustan Times wrote, "Esha Gupta looks good as Sonia but the show under-utilises her." Gupta will next appear in Ameesha Patel's much delayed Desi Magic. She also has Hera Pheri 3 and File No. 323 in the pipeline.

== Activism ==
Esha is seen participating in environmental initiatives including “Beach Cleanup Drives”, “Walk for saving the Mangroves”, protecting the forests. She is also associated with Surman Sansthan towards girl child upliftment and education. She also supports Sealegacy to raise awareness towards saving Shark species from extinction.

== Personal life and media image ==
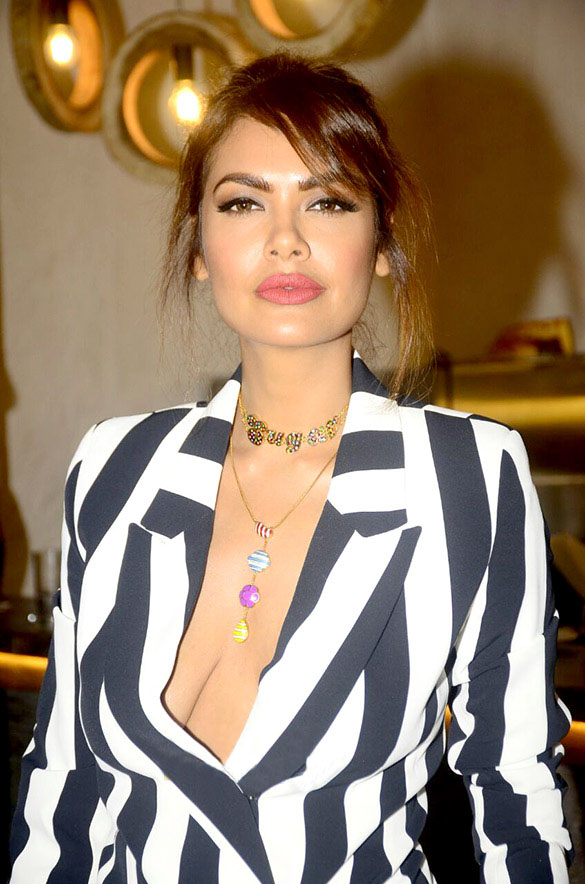
Gupta in 2017

Gupta is dating Spain-based Manuel Campos Guallar.

She is a vegan. Gupta said at the time that "being vegetarian saved the lives of animals and she thought it was a healthy way for both humans and the planet to embrace vegetarianism."

In January 2019, Arsenal forward Alex Iwobi was the subject of alleged racism from Indian actress Esha Gupta, an Arsenal ambassador. Gupta chose to share a screengrab of a WhatsApp conversation in which a friend mocked Iwobi as a "gorilla" and "Neanderthal" who "evolution had stopped for". Gupta later apologized.

Gupta ranked 5th in 2017, 21st in 2018 and 32nd in 2019 in Times' 50 Most Desirable Women list. Gupta is an endorser of brands such as Hazoorilal Legacy and gaming brand Khelraja.

== Filmography ==
=== Films ===
Key
†	Denotes productions that have not yet been released

- All films are in Hindi unless otherwise noted.

Year	Title	Role	Notes	Ref.
2012	Jannat 2	Dr. Janhvi Singh Tomar	Debut film	
2012	Raaz 3D	Sanjana Krishna		
2012	Chakravyuh	Rhea Menon		
2013	Gori Tere Pyaar Mein	Nisha	Special Appearance	
2014	Humshakals	Dr. Shivani Gupta		
2015	Baby	Herself	Special appearance in the song "Beparwah"	
2016	Rustom	Priti Makhija		
2016	Tutak Tutak Tutiya	Herself	Special appearance in the song "Rail Gaddi"	
2017	Commando 2	Maria / Vicky Chaddha		
2017	Baadshaho	Sanjana		
2017	Veedevadu	Shruti	Telugu film	
2017	Yaar Ivan	Shruti	Tamil film	
2018	Paltan	Lt. Col. Raj Singh's wife	Special Appearance	
2019	Vinaya Vidheya Rama	Sharanya	Telugu film; Special appearance in the song "Ek Baar Ek Baar"	
2019	Total Dhamaal	Prachi Malrotkar	Cameo appearance	
2019	One Day: Justice Delivered	DCP Laxmi Rathi		
2026	Dhamaal 4	Aalia	Cameo appearance	

=== Television ===
Year	Title	Role	Notes	Ref.
2012	NAT GEO Super Cars	Host		
2012	C.I.D	Herself	Episode: "Bhootiya Haveli"	
2018	High Fever — Dance Ka Naya Tevar	Judge		

=== Web series ===
Year	Title	Role	Notes	Ref.
2020	REJCTX	Officer Renee Ray	Season 2	
2021	Nakaab	Officer Aditi Amre		
2022–present	Aashram	Sonia	Season 3 Part 1	

=== Music video appearances ===
Year	Title	Singer(s)	Ref.
2015	"Main Rahoon Ya Na Rahoon"	Armaan Malik	
2019	"Get Dirty"	Ishika Bakshi, Gourov Das Gupta	
2021	"Booha"	Shree Brar	
2025	"Maniac"	Yo Yo Honey Singh	
2025	"Ishq Mera"	Jubin Nautiyal	

== Awards and nominations ==
Year	Awards	Category	Work	Result	Ref.
2012	ETC Bollywood Business Awards	Most Profitable Debut (Female)	Raaz 3	Nominated	
2013	Filmfare Awards	Best Female Debut	Jannat 2	Nominated	
2013	Zee Cine Award	Best Female Debut	Jannat 2	Nominated	
2013	Stardust Award	Superstar of Tomorrow – Female	Jannat 2 & Raaz 3	Nominated	
2013	Stardust Award	Best Actress	Chakravyuh	Nominated	
2014	Screen Awards	Best Actress (Popular Choice)	Humshakals	Nominated	
2017	BIG Star Entertainment Awards	Most Entertaining Actor in a Thriller Film – Female	Rustom	Nominated	

Awards and achievements
Preceded by Sonnalli Seygall	Miss International India; 2007	Succeeded by Radha Brahmbhatt
