= Ashish Chaudhary =

Indian actor (born 1978/1979)

Ashish Chowdhry
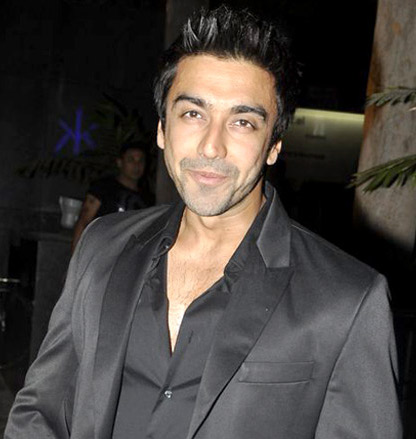
- Born: 1978 or 1979 (age 47–48); Mumbai, Maharashtra, India
- Occupation: Actor
- Years active: 1995–present
- Spouse: Samita Bangargi (m. 2006)

Ashish Chowdhry (Note: Sometimes spelled as Chaudhary or Choudhary.) (born 1978/1979) is an Indian actor who has acted in many Hindi films and television productions. He is best known for portraying Boman in the comedies Dhamaal (2007) and Double Dhamaal (2011) and winning Fear Factor: Khatron Ke Khiladi 6.

== Filmography ==
=== Films ===
Year	Title	Role	Notes
1999	Chalo America	Surendra Pagnis "Sunny"	
2003	Qayamat: City Under Threat	Rahul Gupta	
2004	Shaadi Ka Laddoo	Ravi Kapoor	
2004	Girlfriend	Rahul Chaudhary	
2006	Fight Club - Members Only	Dikku	
2006	Teesri Aankh: The Hidden Camera	Rahul	
2007	Speed	Major Rohan Nath	
2007	Dhamaal	Boman Contractor	
2008	Rama Rama Kya Hai Dramaaa	Prem Bhatia	
2008	EMI	Anil Sharma	
2008	Bhoothnath	Rohan	cameo appearance
2009	Kisse Pyaar Karoon	John D'Monto	
2009	Paying Guests	Parikshit Pandey	
2009	Three- Love, Lies and Betrayal	Sanjay	
2009	Daddy Cool	Brian	
2011	Double Dhamaal	Boman Contractor/Dodo	
2025	Kaushaljis vs Kaushal	Vicky Maurya	

=== Television ===
Year	Title	Role	Notes
1995–1996	Apne Jaise Types	Himself	
1997	Humko Ishq Ne Maara	Bean/Abhimanyu	Television film
2001	Hum Pardesi Ho Gaye	Rahul	
2002	Sarhadh	Raj	
2014	Ek Mutthi Aasmaan	Raghav Singhania	
2015	Fear Factor: Khatron Ke Khiladi 6	Contestant	Winner
2015	Jhalak Dikhhla Jaa 8	Contestant	12th place
2017–2018	Dev	Detective Dev Anand Burman	
2019–2020	Beyhadh 2	Mrityunjay Roy	

=== Music videos ===
Year	Title	Singer	Language
2001	Na Marte Hum	Asha Bhosle	Hindi
