= Total Dhamaal =

2019 Indian film by Indra Kumar

- Theatrical release poster
- Directed by: Indra Kumar
- Screenplay by: Ved Prakash; Paritosh Painter; Bunty Rathore
- Story by: Indra Kumar
- Produced by: Ajay Devgn; Ashok Thakeria; Indra Kumar; Markand Adhikari; Anand Pandit
- Starring: Ajay Devgn; Anil Kapoor; Madhuri Dixit; Riteish Deshmukh; Arshad Warsi; Sanjay Mishra; Jaaved Jaffrey; Boman Irani; Johnny Lever; Vijay Patkar; Boman Irani; Mahesh Manjrekar
- Cinematography: Keiko Nakahara
- Edited by: Dharmendra Sharma
- Music by: Songs: Gourov-Roshin; Score: Sandeep Shirodkar
- Production companies: Fox Star Studios; Ajay Devgn FFilms; Maruti International; Sri Adhikari Brothers Motion Pictures; Anand Pandit Motion Pictures; Pen Studios; Mangl Murti Films
- Distributed by: Fox Star Studios
- Release date: 22 February 2019
- Running time: 127 minutes
- Country: India
- Language: Hindi
- Budget: ₹90–100 crore
- Box office: ₹228.27 crore

Total Dhamaal is a 2019 Indian Hindi-language adventure comedy film directed and written by Indra Kumar. The film is the third installment of Dhamaal series. It stars Ajay Devgn, Anil Kapoor, Madhuri Dixit, Riteish Deshmukh, Arshad Warsi, Sanjay Mishra and Jaaved Jaffrey, along with Boman Irani, Vijay Patkar and Mahesh Manjrekar.

The storyline of the film is loosely based on 2015 American film Vacation and some scenes borrowed from the 2014 American film Blended. Total Dhamaal was released on 22 February 2019 to polarizing reviews. Made on a budget of ₹90–100 crore, Total Dhamaal grossed ₹228.27 crore worldwide and became commercially successful. A sequel titled Dhamaal 4 was released in July 2026.

This is the last film released by Fox Star Studios before the acquisition of 21st Century Fox by Disney, which was completed in March 2019.

== Plot ==
Guddu and his partner Johnny steal ₹50 crore of black money from Police Commissioner Shamsher Singh. When they try to escape, their associate Pintoo double-crosses them and drives away with money. Avinash and Bindu are a troubled couple who file for divorce and clash over the custody of their child. Lallan and Jhingur are partners who work in a fire brigade service where they only save people first who bribe them which leads to them being fired after causing a mishap while rescuing people from a house in fire. Adi and Manav find a job at an art gallery where they accidentally destroy the whole gallery and escape with the owner's advanced remote-controlled car. Meanwhile, Pintoo plans to leave the country but Guddu and Johnny catch up to him. While running from them, Pintoo gets onto a private plane to escape but realizes too late that instead of the pilot, he brought the janitor with him. The janitor escapes with the only parachute and the plane crashes. Coincidentally everyone arrives at the site of the crash where Pintoo reveals that the money is kept in the Omkar Zoo in Janakpur by him and asks them to look under an OK. After learning about the money, everyone decides to grab the money for themselves.

Guddu and Johnny's car breaks down and they wait on the road to find another car. After finding one, they come across the Police Commissioner who then chases them both to a railway crossing, and they nearly escape the Commissioner when a train collides with their car. They then find an advanced car with a sarcastic Chindi-speaking G.P.S system that directs them to wrong routes and ultimately leads the car down a steep slope and destroys the car. Finally, they get on a plane which they believe is going on a diving trip but soon find out that it is actually going for a skydiving trip and are forced to both reluctantly jump off the plane. Avinash drives the car into the forest while claiming he knows a shortcut to the airport. When they get lost in the forest, they meet a local villager who claims to know the route to the highway. They both take him with them and try to cross a wooden bridge to get to the other side which breaks down. After luckily avoiding falling into the cliff, they realize that the villager was instead leading them to a restaurant called Hotel Highway which leads Avinash to beat him. Later, they try to cross a river to get to the real highway, which gets filled by water when the dam gets opened and they get swept to the edge of the waterfall. Lallan takes him and Jhingur to a nearby helicopter service, where they travel on an old and broken helicopter of the owner which is on the verge of crashing. They jump off the crashing helicopter and land on a building under construction. Adi and Manav use the stolen car to reach Janakpur. However, Adi crashes the car in a desert after getting distracted by an attractive woman and then he and Manav accidentally mess up with the remote, causing the car to blow up and they barely escape the burning car. Soon, they get attacked by a flock of vulture and Adi gets stuck in quicksand after escaping them. Manav finds a snake instead and Adi is forced to grab it to get out. When Adi gets out, he bashes Manav for not bringing a nearby rope that was being used for laundry.

After somehow escaping near-death scenarios, everyone reaches Omkar Zoo where they start finding the hidden money. They see that a man named Chinappa Swamy is planning to illegally close the zoo and turn it into a housing colony by killing all the animals. When the caretaker Prachi disagrees, he locks her inside the control station. The group then sees that Chinappa's men are poisoning the animal's food to kill them. Using with poison When Jhingur, Manav, Johnny and Bindu ask to save them, the group decides to save the animals. Guddu comes across a lion and succeeds in keeping him from eating the poisoned steak. Lallan and Jhingur try to stop a baby gorilla from eating the poisoned bananas but Lallan gets beaten up by the father gorilla. Lallan saves the gorillas by convincing them to not eat the bananas. Adi and Manav try to rescue a baby elephant which has eaten the poisoned sugarcanes. They save him but the elephant pukes on Adi and the elephants thank them. Avinash and Bindu try to stop a tiger from eating the poisoned meat but Bindu gets chased by the tiger and she escapes him by climbing up a tree. Avinash then succeeds in convincing the tiger. Prachi gets freed when her pet monkey Security opens the door. After successfully saving the animals, the group finds the OK and decides to split the money equally between all of them. They, along with the Commissioner after finally tracking down Guddu and Johnny, are confronted by Chinappa but get saved when Security holds a gun to Chinappa's face. The animals then chase Chinappa. The Commissioner forgives Guddu and Johnny when he also receives some of the money. Avinash and Bindu forgive each other and decide to live happily together. Guddu falls in love with Prachi with Johnny asking if he can get a girlfriend too.

== Cast ==
- Ajay Devgn as Guddu Rastogi
- Anil Kapoor as Avinash "Avi" Patel
- Madhuri Dixit as Bindu Patel
- Riteish Deshmukh as Deshbandhu "Lallan" Roy
- Arshad Warsi as Aditya "Adi" Srivastava
- Sanjay Mishra as Johnny D'Costa
- Jaaved Jaffrey as Manav Srivastava
- Esha Gupta as Prachi Malrotkar (special appearance)
- Pitobash Tripathy as Jhingur
- Johnny Lever as Pilot
- Boman Irani as Commissioner Shamsher "Don" Singh
- Vijay Patkar as Inspector Abbas Khan
- Manoj Pahwa as Pintu Choksey
- Mahesh Manjrekar as Chinappa Swamy, a criminal who wants to illegally close down Omkar Zoo and turn it into his housing council
- Ali as the Tamil guy, "Nariyal Paani" (transl. Coconut water)
- Crystal the Monkey as Security (Monkey)
- Sudesh Lehri as Altaaf
- Mallika Sherawat as Ho
- Niharica Raizada as Roma
- Jackie Shroff as GPS (voice only)
- Sonakshi Sinha (special appearance in the song 'Mungda')

== Production ==
=== Casting ===
Besides Riteish Deshmukh, Arshad Warsi and Javed Jaffrey, director Indra Kumar signed Ajay Devgn for the third part of his Dhamaal film series in late May 2017. Anil Kapoor and Madhuri Dixit were also signed in mid-November 2017 marking their collaboration after seventeen years when they acted together in the film Pukar. Esha Gupta was signed in June 2018.

In late December 2017, Ajay Devgn FFilms collaborated with Fox Star Studios to produce the film. Pen India Limited and Mangl Murti Films came on board as co-producers.

=== Filming ===
Principal photography commenced in Mumbai on 9 January 2018, and ended in August 2018.

== Music ==
Total Dhamaal

Soundtrack album by Gourov-Roshin
- Released: 22 February 2019
- Recorded: 2017–18
- Genre: Feature Film Soundtrack
- Length: 13:25
- Language: Hindi
- Label: Saregama
External audio
- Official Audio Jukebox on YouTube

Gourov-Roshin chronology
Baaghi 2 (2018)	Total Dhamaal (2019)

The film score was composed by Sandeep Shirodkar while the songs in the film were composed by Gourov-Roshin, with lyrics by Kumaar and Kunwar Juneja. Vatsal Chevli assisted in mixing all the songs. All songs mixed by Aftab at headroom studios.

Track listing
No.	Title	Lyrics	Singer(s)	Length
1.	"Paisa Yeh Paisa" (From Karz)	Kunwar Juneja	Dev Negi, Subhro Ganguly, Arpita Chakraborty	4:01
2.	"Mungda" (From Inkaar)	Kunwar Juneja	Jyotica Tangri, Shaan, Subhro Ganguly	3:16
3.	"Speaker Phat Jaaye"	Kumaar	Harrdy Sandhu, Abuzar Akhtar, Aditi Singh Sharma, Jonita Gandhi	2:58
4.	"Theme Song"	Kumaar	Dev Negi	3:10
Total length:				13:25

== Release ==
=== Theatrical ===
The film was released on 22 February 2019 on 3700 screens in India and on 786 screens in overseas market making worldwide count of 4486 screens. Earlier was set to release on 7 December 2018 but due to extended VFX work the release date has been pushed back to 22 February 2019. The film has been certified with runtime of 127 mins by British Board of Film Classification and all set to release on schedule.

After Pulwama attack, Ajay Devgn and Total Dhamaal makers have decided not to release Total Dhamaal in Pakistan. The makers of the film including the entire crew, actors and makers have donated ₹50 lakhs to families of soldiers who died in the Pulwama attack.

=== Marketing ===
The first teaser look of the film is released on 14 January 2019. The first look theatrical poster was released on 18 January 2019. The second look poster released on 19 January 2019 with trailer release date announcement on 21 January 2019. Third official theatrical poster of the film is unveiled on 20 January 2019. It is promising "The wildest adventure ever!"

Two theatrical fresh look posters of the film are made public on 21 January 2019. These have pictures of main cast on it.

=== Home media ===
The film became available as VOD on Disney+ Hotstar on 20 April 2019. The Blu-ray and DVD was also released in August 2019 by Shemaroo.

== Reception ==
=== Box office ===
The opening day (non-holiday) collection of the film from Indian market was ₹16.50 crore. Its lifetime domestic gross collection was ₹182.09 crore and from overseas markets it was ₹46.18 crore. The worldwide gross collection of the film was ₹228.7 million. The film grossed ₹100 crore (US$10 million) worldwide in three days of release. In opening week the film grossed ₹150 crore (US$16 million). In 12 days of its release the film crossed ₹200 crore (US$21 million) mark in gross collection.

=== Critical response ===
On the review aggregator website Rotten Tomatoes, 30% of 10 critics' reviews are positive, with an average rating of 3/10. Taran Adarsh rated the film with three stars and found it entertaining and loaded with clean humour. Himesh Mankad from Koimoi gives 3 star out of 5 says "Total Dhamaal is a fair clean entertainer that can be enjoyed with the entire family. It's definitely an improvement over previous installment Double Dhamaal". Ronak Kotecha writing for The Times of India gave two stars out of five and feels that in the ensemble cast, the film had the potential to be a comic roller coaster ride. He concluded saying "However, the fact that the film is slapstick is not a problem, what brings it down is poor writing and execution." Rajeev Masand of CNN-IBN gave 1.5 stars out of 5, commenting "I want to say here that I’m not against comedies that require complete suspension of disbelief. But even that requires thought, clever writing, and a lightness of touch. Total Dhamaal has none of those things. It’s a cash-grab film that believes ‘bigger is better’. Alas it’s not. From multiple remix songs, to the low-IQ racist and sexist humour, and a reliance on familiar gags and tropes, this is lazy, cynical filmmaking." Raja Sen writing for Hindustan Times rated the film with one star out of five.

== Future ==
=== Dhamaal 4 (2026) ===
After the trailer release of Total Dhamaal, the third movie in an interview, director Indra Kumar said that another Dhamaal sequel is definitely on the cards and added that he has already registered two titles – Triple Dhamaal and Full On Dhamaal. Eventually, the fourth installment titled Dhamaal 4 was confirmed in 2024. It was theatrically released on 10 July 2026.
