= Nitz 'N' Sony =

Indian music director and composer

- Origin: Mumbai, India
- Genres: Film score, Fusion music, Bollywood
- Years active: 2005–present
- Members: Nitin Arora & Sony Chandy
- Past members: None
- Website: Nitz 'N' Sony official website

Nitz 'N' Sony, also known as Nitin Arora & Sony Chandy, are an Indian music director and composer duo in the Hindi film industry, working together since 2006 They are both Hotel Management Graduates from the PUSA institute and are self taught musicians.

Nitz 'N' Sony, have composed music for several Indian movies including Money Hai Toh Honey Hai starring Govinda and Swami starring Manoj Bajpai and Juhi Chawla.

== Notable movies / work ==
#	Movie / Album	Year	Starring	Songs
01	Teesri Aankh: The Hidden Camera	2006	Sunny Deol & Amisha Patel	1 song (Sharabiyon-Lounge Mix)
02	Swami (2007 film)	2007	Manoj Bajpai & Juhi Chawla	All songs
03	Money Hai Toh Honey Hai	2008	Govinda	All songs
04	Spark	2014	Rajneesh Duggal & Subhashree Ganguly	2 songs
05	Hey Bro	2015	Ganesh Acharya & Maninder Singh	All songs

== See also ==
- Bollywood
- Teesri Aankh: The Hidden Camera
