= Ramjas College =

Constituent college of University of Delhi

Coordinates: 28°41′8.6640″N 77°12′22.9788″E

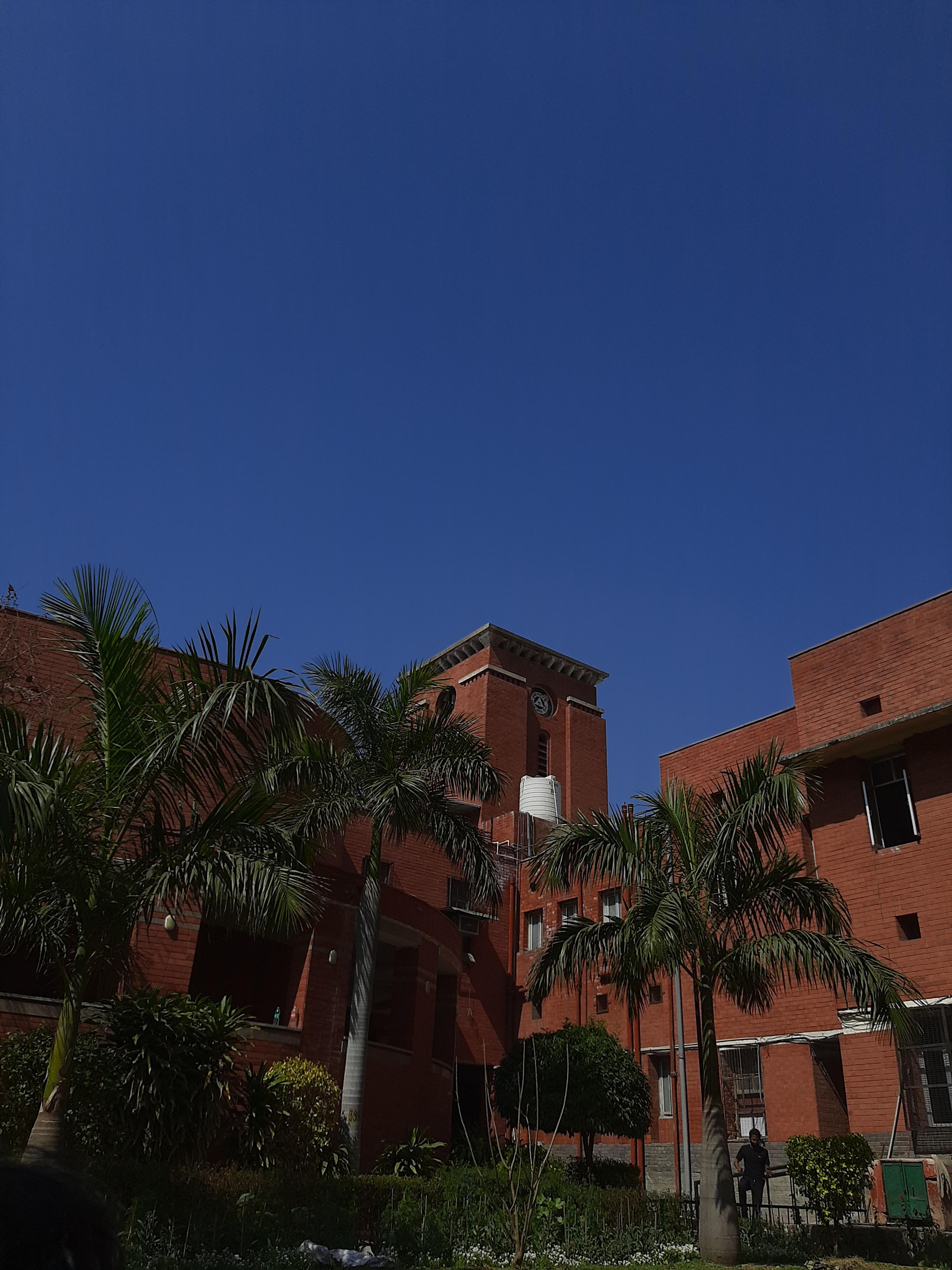
- Front facade of the college in 2022
- Motto: "Knowledge Has No Comparison"
- Type: Degree College
- Established: 1917; 109 years ago
- Founder: Rai Kedar Nath
- Academic affiliations: University of Delhi
- Principal: Ajay Kumar Arora
- Location: Delhi
- Campus: Urban
- Website: ramjas.du.ac.in

Ramjas College is one of the oldest constituent colleges of the University of Delhi, located in its North Campus in Delhi, India. It was founded by the educationist and philanthropist Rai Kedar Nath with the aim of providing affordable higher education.

Ramjas is one of three founding colleges of the University of Delhi, alongside Hindu College and St. Stephen's College. According to its website, Nath, the college's founder, also played a significant role in the naming of Delhi University.

== History ==
Founded on 17 January 1917 by the educationist and philanthropist, Rai Kedar Nath, the college was named in memory of his father, Lala Ramjas. In its initial days, the college was solely run by the Ramjas Foundation, an educational society that presently runs 16 schools and other educational institutions across Delhi. Ramjas was upgraded to the degree level under the aegis of University of Delhi when the latter was founded in 1922. Nevertheless, Ramjas Foundation continued to oversee its administration. In 1924, its other branch named Ramjas Intermediate College was opened at Daryaganj and the old college was moved to a new campus at Anand Parbat (then Kala Pahad) near the Serai Rohilla Station about two miles from heart of city. This campus was inaugurated by Mahatma Gandhi, a good friend of Rai Kedar Nath. However, the college had to cede its campus at Anand Parbat to the British Wireless Experimental Centre during World War II. During the Second World War a group of Ramjas students became active in the Quit India Movement resulting in them being arrested and jailed. Their names are inscribed on a memorial plaque near the college auditorium's entrance. Now almost equal in number, there were only two females out of 161 students in 1942–43 session.

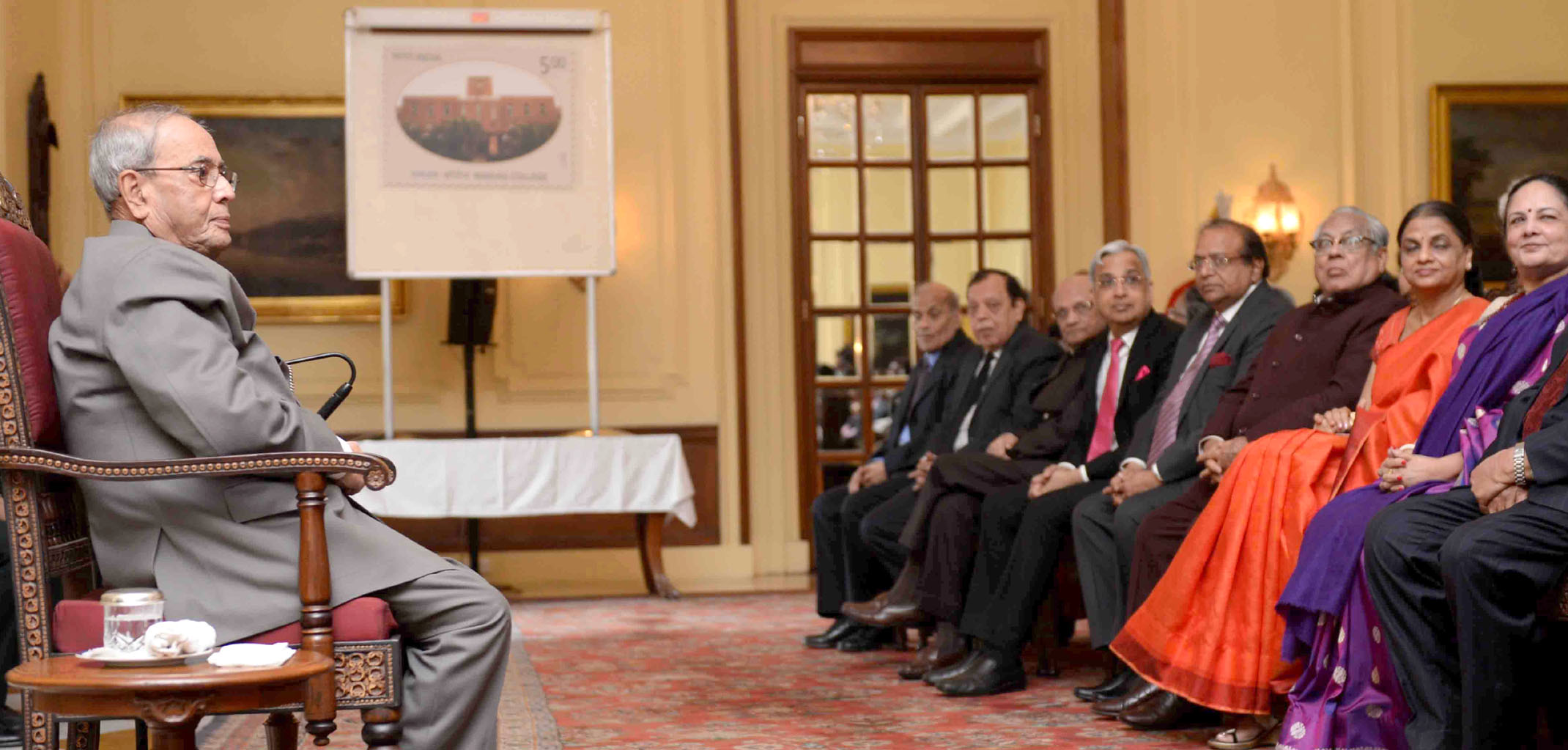
The President, Shri Pranab Mukherjee released the centenary postage stamp at the centenary celebrations of Ramjas College, at Rashtrapati Bhavan, in New Delhi on 13 February 2017

The college relocated to its current location in 1950. Dr Rajendra Prasad, the first President of India inaugurated the present building on 17 January 1951. He even sent his daughters to study here. After the death of Rai Kedarnath, Dr. B. R. Ambedkar, the architect of Constitution of India and first Minister of Law and Justice of India, acted as the Chairman of Governing Body of Ramjas College. Ramjas had the distinct privilege as the only College in Delhi of having him in its Governing Body. On 12 February 1959, during his visit to India, the American civil rights leader Martin Luther King Jr. addressed the Delhi University Students' Union at the college.

In January 2004, the College organised the first-ever Conference of Graduate Students of Economics from the SAARC countries.

Ramjas celebrated its centennial legacy throughout 2016 and completed a 100 years in January 2017. In 2017, India Post issued a postage stamp to commemorate the centenary year of Ramjas college Delhi.

Ramjas College hosts the Ramjas Political Review, which is the ISSN-recognised biannual, peer-reviewed academic research journal run by the undergraduate students of the Department of Political Science. The first issue was released in 2023 as Volume 1(1) with Prathit Singh as the Editor-in-Chief. Further issues, Vol 1(2), 2(1), 2(2), 3(1), have been led by Prem Ansh Sinha as the Editor-in-Chief. Ramjas Political Review has also hosted several renowned academics like Professor Quentin Skinner, Professor Madhavan Palat, Professor SD Muni, Professor Amitabh Mattoo, and authors like Sanjeev Sanyal, Swapan Dasgupta, various politicians, and former foreign secretaries, Amb Maharajakrishna Rasgotra, Amb Shivshankar Menon, and Amb Shyam Saran, where they have been interviewed by the Editor-in-Chief. In such a short span of time, Ramjas Political Review has emerged as a paragon of excellence in the academic circles in the University of Delhi.

Ramjas College hosted the first edition of the Delhi University Literature Festival, officiated by the University of Delhi in its centenary year. Scheduled 17–19 March 2023, the exercise was led by Swapan Dasgupta as the festival director and Sanjeev Sanyal as the festival Patron. Several renowned figures such as Rajyavardhan Rathore, Gen. Manoj Naravane, Bibek Debroy, and others participated in this literary exercise.

== Academics ==
=== Academic programmes ===
The college offers 8 Bachelor of Arts courses, 8 Bachelor of Science courses, and 2 Bachelor of Commerce courses at the undergraduate level. The primary medium of instruction of courses is English. Further, it offers 18 postgraduate courses in sciences, humanities and commerce streams. Additionally, there are 26 add-on courses and 6 foreign language courses on offer.

Admissions for the college are now done through the CUET. The CUET cut-offs for the arts and commerce courses are exceptionally high. Even before CUET, the cut-offs were among the highest in the country, with the BA (Hons) Political Science cut-off reaching 100 percent in the final year of admissions based on board exam marks.

=== Rankings ===
The college was ranked 28th by National Institutional Ranking Framework in its 2025 college rankings.

In 2025, India Today ranked Ramjas College 9th among commerce colleges, 10th among arts colleges and 15th among science colleges in India.

== Campus ==
The college's red coloured building is surrounded by over 76 species of trees and foliage which has earned it the title 'Rainforest'.

=== Infrastructure ===
Ramjas' fully air-conditioned auditorium (450 capacity), a Conference Hall (200 capacity), and a Seminar Room form the nucleus of all the academic conferences, events and proceedings of the college. It has facilities for volleyball, basketball, football and table tennis, etc. It also has its own shooting range and an archery range within the campus. The college has 96 classrooms across two buildings which are mostly equipped with state of the art projectors. The college also boasts of 27 departmental libraries indicative of a strong research environment. The Dr Harsh Malhotra Research Lab, and Gaudhan Research Lab (sponsored by Ministry of Animal Husbandry and Dairy) are few of the highlights. Its New Academic Block, which is one of the tallest in the University of Delhi, was inaugurated in 2017 with its centennial celebrations. It is equipped with lifts for easy access. The college also has a dedicated ECA (extra-curricular activity) Room. A fully air-conditioned gym is also present for all students to use. Other infrastructural elements include a physiotherapy room, a girls' common room, medical room, photocopy shop and a staff room.

=== Hostel ===
The college also provides on campus hostel facilities with 80 seats for girls and 120 seats for boys.

== Student societies ==
The college is also known for its students' involvement in student politics. The DUSU (Delhi University Students' Union) has been known to have major contributions from Ramjas College, the most important being the victory of alumnus Akshit Dahiya as the DUSU President (2019–20) with a margin of 19,069 votes and him also being the youngest DUSU President in a very long time, aged 20 when elected. In the recent election,Tushar Sankhla become the President of Ramjas College

The Woman Development Cell, and the Gender Sensitization Committee foster an equitable environment.

1. The Ramjas Debating Society is one of the best-debating societies in India, having made some major contributions to the Indian Debating Circuit. It has separate wings for Hindi and English. Its flagship AP-Debate Tournament 'Polemic' has been hosted for over two decades. Members of the society have qualified at multiple international tournaments such as Oxford, Harvard, LSE and WUDC.

2. The Ramjas Fine Arts Society, 'Mélange' is one of the oldest art societies in the University of Delhi. With its active social media presence and yearly newsletters, it strives to create an artistically and socially open space for students to express themselves freely through the expression of art.

3. The Ramjas Dramatics Society, 'Shunya' is a reputed society in the Delhi circuit. It encourages free expression of emotions through acting, and production.

4. Enactus, Ramjas was established in 2011, the team of more than 50 dedicated students have been helping underprivileged communities and individuals to earn a living through developing entrepreneurial opportunities for the same in the country.

5. The Ramjas Literary Society, 'Wordcraft' was founded in 1987. Ever since its inception, Wordcraft has been at the heart of expression through creative writing for the students of Ramjas College.

6. The Philosophy Society of Ramjas, 'Darshan' has grown to become one of the most exclusive societies in the college through its frequent hosting of meaningful and thought-provoking discussions and seminars.

7. NSS, Ramjas provides hands-on experience to young students in delivering community service.

9. Illuminer Counsel (Ramjas chapter)

10. The Ramjas Placements Society, 'Pinnacle'

11. The Ramjas MUN Society, 'TRMUN'

12. The Ramjas Dancing Society

13. 'The Ramjas Music Society, 'Backbeat', was founded in 1996, providing a forum not only for musical enhancement but for the intellectual, creative and cultural development of students.

14. The Ramjas Film and Photography Society Ramjas, 'Focus' was founded in the year 2000, and aims at providing a platform for amateurs to nurture their passion for photography besides offering a platform to facilitate the digitalisation of creativity.

15.Lakshay: The Civil Services Society

Established in 2024, Lakshay is the Civil Services Society of Ramjas College. It provides a platform for UPSC aspirants to engage in discussions, mock tests, and events like seminars and talks with civil servants.

=== Academic journals and magazines ===
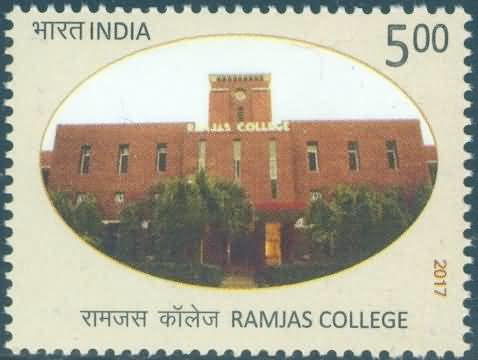
Stamp of India 2017 Centenary of Ramjas College University of Delhi

Ramjas also encourages academic writing and research.

Ramjas Economic Review (ISSN(O): 2582-6093) is a peer-reviewed international academic research journal run by the department of Economics, Ramjas College, University of Delhi. The journal provides a platform for undergraduate students to publish original research in the discipline of economics. It receives submissions from students across India and countries in South and Southeast Asia. It is one of the only international undergraduate research journals of economics in the University of Delhi that is ISSN certified.

Ramjas Political Review is the biannual peer-reviewed academic research journal run by the undergraduate students of the Department of Political Science, Ramjas College, University of Delhi. It is the only political science journal in the University of Delhi with an International Standard Serial Number, which is ISSN (O): 3048-5886. It has engaged with former foreign secretaries and renowned scholars across the globe.

== Notable alumni ==
- Kuladhar Saikia, Author, retired IPS officer and former DGP of Assam
- Sumit Antil, Gold medalist, javelin throw, Tokyo 2020 Paralympic Games, Paris 2024 Paralympic Games
- Angaraag Mahanta (Papon), composer and singer
- Vivekanand Sinha, IPS and Inspector General of Police of Bastar
- Ch. Sarup Singh, former minister of Excise and Taxation, Development and Cooperation, Haryana; and a former Speaker of Haryana
- Chaudhary Brahm Prakash, 1st Chief Minister of Delhi
- Kahlil Joseph, American actor
- Manish Jha, film director
- Manoj Bajpai, actor
- Nivedita Tiwari, TV actress
- Pathik Vats, dialogue writer & lyricist
- Prakash Jha, film director
- Pratap Keshari Deb, member of Rajya Sabha
- Praveen Kumar, Indian cricketer
- Pravesh Rana, Bigg Boss finalist and Model
- Rahul Roy, actor & documentary filmmaker
- Rajkumar Singh former member Bihar legislative assembly
- Raj Kumar Gupta, film director
- Sanjay Kumar, director CSDS
- Ranbir Singh Hooda, activist
- Swarup Singh, Governor of Gujarat and Governor of Kerala
- Shekhar Suman, actor & presenter
- Rishab Prasanna, flute player
- Somnath Bharti, former Minister of Law and Justice of Delhi
- Vikas Bahl, film director & producer
- Vijender Gupta, Leader of Opposition, Delhi
- Yogesh Kumar Sabharwal, 36th Chief Justice of India
- Vipin Patwa, music composer & singer
- Bhaskar Jyoti Mahanta, IPS Officer, DGP of Assam
- Shivam Pradhan, actor
