= Hey Bro =

2015 film directed by Ajay Chandhok

- Directed by: Ajay Chandhok
- Written by: M. Salim
- Produced by: Vidhi Acharya
- Starring: Ganesh Acharya; Maninder Singh; Nupur Sharma
- Cinematography: Arun Prasad
- Edited by: Nitin Madhukar Rokde
- Music by: Nitz 'N' Sony/DR. NITZ ft. Sonny KC
- Release date: 6 March 2015
- Country: India
- Language: Hindi

Hey Bro is a 2015 Indian Hindi-language action comedy film directed by Ajay Chandhok and produced by Vidhi Acharya. The film stars Ganesh Acharya, Maninder Singh, Nupur Sharma and Hanif Hilal. The film was released on 6 March 2015 with mixed to negative reviews.

== Plot ==
Gopi, a villager, goes to Mumbai searching for his mother and twin brother. Finally, when he meets him, he comes to realize that he and his brother have opposing personalities.

== Cast ==
- Ganesh Acharya as Gopi
- Maninder Singh as Shiv, Gopi's estranged brother who is the head of Mumbai Police Station.
- Nupur Sharma as Anjali
- Hanif Hilal as Baba, A corrupt crime lord Shiv wants to apprehend.
- Indira Krishnan
- Prem Chopra
- Kurush Deboo as Rustom Bandookwalla (Noisy Neighbour)
- Amitabh Bachchan (special appearance in "Birju")
- Akshay Kumar (special appearance in "Birju")
- Ajay Devgn (special appearance in "Birju")
- Hrithik Roshan (special appearance in "Birju")
- Ranveer Singh (special appearance in "Birju")
- Prabhudeva (special appearance in "Birju")
- Govinda (special appearance)
- Aas Mohammad Abbasi (special appearance)
- Avi Khairnar (special appearance)
- Mahie Gill as item number "Bulbul"

== Soundtrack ==
The songs of Hey Bro are composed by Nitz 'N' Sony (Nitin Arora & Sony Chandy), while the lyrics are written by Pranav Vatsa. One of the songs "Birju" was influenced from the dialogues of the 1957 film, Mother India.

Hey Bro

Soundtrack album by Nitz 'N' Sony
- Released: 6 March 2015
- Genre: Feature film soundtrack
- Length: 23:46
- Language: Hindi
- Label: T-Series

Nitz 'N' Sony chronology
Spark (2014)	Hey Bro (2015)

Hey Bro Soundtrack
No.	Title	Singer(s)	Length
1.	"DJ"	Sunidhi Chauhan, Ali Zafar	02:31
2.	"Birju"	Mika Singh, Udit Narayan, Rap by Naezy and Arya	04:28
3.	"Bulbul"	Shreya Ghoshal, Himesh Reshammiya	04:52
4.	"Line Laga"	Mika Singh, Anu Malik	05:29
5.	"Hu Tu Tu"	Sonu Nigam, Sivamani	07:06
Total length:			23:46

== Reception ==
The film was panned by critics and was declared a "Disaster" by Box Office India
