= Madatha Kaja =

Madatha Kaaja
- Theatrical poster
- Directed by: Seetaramaraju Dantuluri
- Screenplay by: Seetaramaraju Dantuluri; Satish Vegesna
- Story by: Seetaramaraju Dantuluri
- Produced by: Vedarajuu Timber
- Starring: Allari Naresh; Sneha Ullal; Maryam Zakaria
- Cinematography: Adusumilli Vijay Kumar
- Edited by: Marthand K. Venkatesh
- Music by: Sri Vasant
- Production companies: Sri Ranjith Movies; Timbuu Productions
- Release date: 29 September 2011
- Country: India
- Language: Telugu

Madatha Kaja is a 2011 Indian Telugu-language romantic comedy film written and directed by Seetaramaraju Dantuluri, produced by Vedarajuu Timber under Timbuu Productions and Sri Ranjith Movies banners and starring Allari Naresh and Sneha Ullal in lead roles. The film soundtrack was composed by Sri Vasant and Cinematography was handled by Adusumilli Vijay Kumar. This film marks the debut of Seetaramaraju Dantuluri as a director. Madata Kaja was released on 29 September 2011 and was a commercial success at the box office.

The film was later dubbed in Hindi as Mera Pyaar in 2018.

== Plot ==
Kalyan (Allari Naresh) is a happy going guy who works as police informer in Vizag. He reports to a local cop, Sai Kumar (Dharmavarapu Subramanyam). He falls for Swapna (Sneha Ullal) and it is love at first sight for him. Swapna is the daughter of KP (Ahuti Prasad). Kalyan's friend Kishore (Vennela Kishore) and cop Sai Kumar helps him in gaining Sneha's love. Meanwhile, the cops ask Kalyan to come to Hyderabad to gather information on two mafia leaders JP (Jaya Prakash Reddy) and KP (Ahuti Prasad). KP takes care of international Don Nanda's (Ashish Vidyarthi) illegal business along with JP. JP and KP always fight with each other which bring losses to Nanda. To make them unite Nanda sketches a plan. He passes an order JP's son should marry KP's daughter. While in the process of helping the Police with the investigation, he then finds out that Swapna is the daughter of KP. With her help, Kalyan is on a mission to get all the information he can on these criminals and their mafia boss in Bangkok, Nanda. Meanwhile, Swapna's marriage is fixed to JP's son Ajay (Subbaraju). He starts playing mind games with the mafia leaders. Kalyan's battle against all these odds will eventually help him bring Nanda to the justice and also win over his love.

== Cast ==
- Allari Naresh as Kalyan
- Sneha Ullal as Swapna
- Maryam Zakaria as Priya
- Ashish Vidyarthi as Nanda
- Ali as Akuvakala Lingaraju/Ali
- Subbaraju as Ajay
- Dharmavarapu Subramanyam as Sai Kumar
- M. S. Narayana
- Ahuti Prasad as KP
- Jaya Prakash Reddy as JP
- Jeeva as Dasu
- Raghu Babu as Puli
- Vennela Kishore as Kishore
- Chalapathi Rao as Vizag Police Commissioner
- Brahmanandam as Padmasri
- Thagubothu Ramesh
- Raghu Karumanchi as Henchman
- Khayyum as Kalyan's friend
- Kavitha

== Soundtrack ==
Madata Kaja

Soundtrack album by Sri Vasant
- Released: 16 September 2011
- Genre: Film soundtrack
- Label: Maruti Music
- Producer: Sri Vasant

Audio release of the film was held on 16 September 2011 in Visakhapatnam. The audio was released and distributed by Aditya Music. The music of this film was composed by Sri Vasant. The audio was well received. Bhaskarabhatla Ravikumar penned 2 songs while Sirivennela Sitaramasastri and Surendra Krishna penned one song each.

No.	Title	Lyrics	Artist(s)	Length
1.	"Madata Kaaja"	Bhaskarabhatla Ravikumar	Revanth	3:41
2.	"Ninnila Choosthu Unte"	Bhaskarabhatla Ravikumar	Hemachandra, Sri Krishna, Malavika, Sravana Bhargavi	3:59
3.	"Excuse Me"	Surendra Krishna	Ranjith, Malavika, Chinmayee Vedaraju	3:48
4.	"Gungudu Gudu Gudu"	Rama Jogayya Sastry	Sravana Bhargavi, Revanth	3:51
5.	"Yama Yamaho"	Sirivennela Sitaramasastri	Sri Krishna, Geeta Madhuri	4:15

== Release and reception ==
The film was released on 29 September 2011. The film was received with mixed to negative reviews. Suresh Kavirayani of Times of India gave a 2.5 of 5 star rating for the film and said the film was a time-pass watch. Radhika Rajamani of Rediff.com rated the film 1.5/5 stars and wrote, "There's nothing sweet about Madatha Kaja even though the film is named after a sweet delicacy from Andhra!" The film fared relatively well at the box-office despite the negative reviews and was declared an average grosser.
