= Muazzam Beg =

Indian film director, producer, writer

- Born: 18 April 1978 (age 48); Shahjahanpur, Uttar Pradesh, India
- Education: Jamia Millia Islamia
- Occupations: Film director, producer, writer
- Years active: 1994–present

Muazzam Beg (born 18 April 1978) is an Indian Bollywood film writer and director.

== Early life ==
Beg was born in Shahjahanpur of Uttar Pradesh state of India. He attended St. Paul's High School, Shahjahanpur, U.P., and has been actively involved in theatre and writing since his school days. His initial brush with theatre was during his school days when he started acting in stage plays. Bitten by the creativity bug, he joined a theatre group in Shahjahanpur and started acting in stage plays while he was a student. From acting, he progressed toward writing and directing plays which also marked his initial foray into the creative world.

In 1996, Beg co-founded a theatre group ABHIVYAKTI Natya Manch in his home town with fellow theatre friends. The group staged their first play Aakhiri Salaam based on the life of Freedom Fighter Ashfaqulla Khan. Buoyed by its success, they followed it up with Antrim Yudh based on the life of Shaheed Bhagat Singh as well as Gandhi ne Kaha Tha based on Gandhian philosophy. These plays were written and directed by famous play writer Rajesh Kumar.

In 1997, he moved to Delhi to pursue his graduation in Economics (Honours) from Jamia Millia Islamia University in New Delhi. He then studied at the Mass Communication Research Centre, Jamia Millia Islamia.

== Career ==
He started his career as an in-house writer in under director Subhash Ghai's production house Mukta Arts. Apart from working closely with Ghai, Beg worked under the guidance of veteran screenwriters like Shabd Kumar and Sachin Bhowmick.

His first independent work was as dialogue writer of the 2007 film Swami, starring Manoj Bajpayee and Juhi Chawla in lead roles. The screenplay was co-written with Bhavani Ayyer, writer of Black (2005).

His debut as a solo writer came in the 2008 film, Money Hai Toh Honey Hai.

Along with director Imtiaz Ali, Beg co-wrote the 2011 film Rockstar which earned him wide critical reception and Zee Cine Award 2011.

In 2012, Beg came up with his directorial debut film Sadda Adda, a teen-comedy of six bachelors.

In 2013 he announced his new project titled Munna Bhai, Sallu Bhai – Killers or Healers which would be a docu-drama of the lives of actors Sanjay Dutt and Salman Khan. The film will be produced by Beg under his NGO banner "Indian Film Fraternity".

In 2025, Beg co-wrote the screenplay and wrote the dialogues for the Hindi biographical film Phule, directed by Ananth Mahadevan. The film, which stars Pratik Gandhi and Patralekhaa as social reformers Jyotirao Phule and Savitribai Phule, was released in theatres on 25 April 2025.

== Career graph ==
=== Writer ===
- Critically acclaimed film Swami starring Manoj Bajpayee and Juhi Chawla was Muazzam Beg's first independent movie as a writer. He shared the screenplay credit with Bhavani Iyer (writer of Sanjay Leela Bhasali's Black).
- Money Hai Toh Honey Hai (2008) starring Govinda, Manoj Bajpayee, Aftab Shivdasani, Hansika Motwani, Upen Patel, Ravi Kishan and Celina Jaitley and jointly produced by Eros International and Kumar Mangat was Muazzam Beg's first movie as a solo writer.
- Ranbir Kapoor, Nargis Fakhri starrer Rockstar (2011) earned him wide critical reception and his first award (Zee Cine Award). A semi-autobiographical account of a musician who finds success after a heartbreak was appreciated by critics and audience for Beg's innovative story.

=== Director/producer ===
- Sadda Adda (2012) marked Beg's directorial debut in Bollywood. This critically acclaimed movie, though initially unnoticed, went on to be considered as one of the best youth comedies revolving around college campuses in recent times.
- 2013 marked a new beginning for Beg when he donned the producer's mantle and started his production house, Hindustan Light and Sound Movie Service which will produce his latest directorial venture Munna Bhai Sallu Bhai. This film is designed to be a cinematic ode to superstars Sanjay Dutt and Salman Khan and will also mark the first congregation of 25,000 die-hard fans for a movie. It was scheduled to be may be released in the third quarter of 2014.

== Filmography ==
- 2007 – Swami as co-writer
- 2008 – Money Hai Toh Honey Hai as writer
- 2011 – Rockstar as co-writer
- 2011 – Angel – story writer
- 2012 – Sadda Adda as writer, director
- 2012 – Agent Vinod – singer
- 2012 – Rush – singer
- 2025 – Phule – screenplay and dialogue writer

== Awards ==
Zee Cine Award

Won

- 2011: Zee Cine Award Best Screenplay – Rockstar
