= Sanjay Kumar (professor) =

Indian political scientist

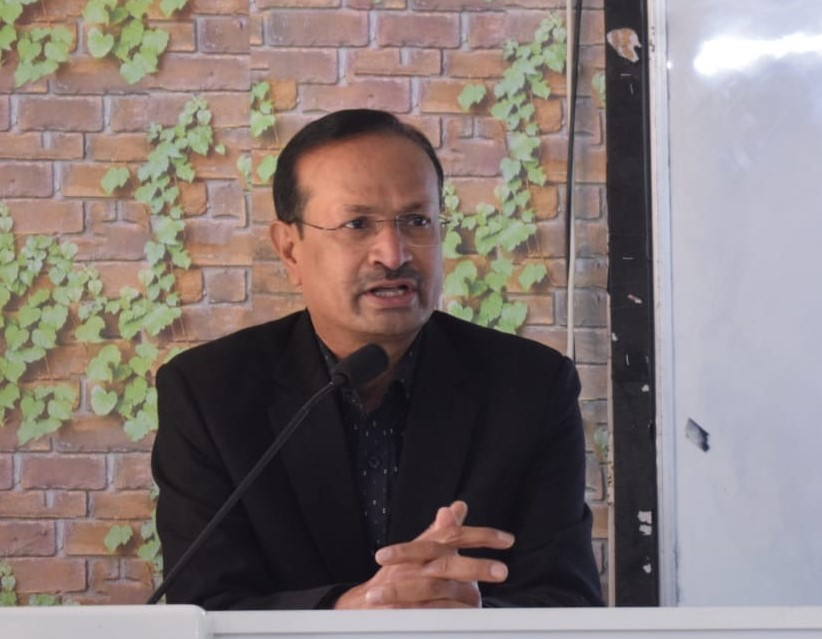

Director, CSDS
- In office 2014–2020
- Succeeded by: Rajeev Bhargava

Personal details
- Education: University of Delhi
- Profession: Political Analyst and Psephologist

Sanjay Kumar is an Indian political analyst and psephologist. He served as the director of Centre for the Study of Developing Societies from January 2014 to January 2020. His primarily areas of interest lies are electoral politics, political mobilization, Indian youth and Indian democracy. He has conducted research on a wide range of themes, including state of democracy in South Asia, state of Indian farmers, electoral violence and slums of Delhi.

== Education ==
He graduated with B.A in Political Science from Ramjas College, University of Delhi in 1988. He completed his Masters and M. Phil from University of Delhi. He studied survey research at the University of Michigan Survey Research Center.

== Career ==
He succeeded Rajeev Bhargava as Director of Centre for the Study of Developing Societies in 2014. He serves as co-director of Lokniti Programme. He has published widely, written and edited books, contributed chapters for edited volumes and published articles in national and international research journals.

He writes regularly for national and regional newspapers, in English and Hindi. His articles are published regularly in The Hindu, The Indian Express, The Asian Age, Deccan Chronicle, Dainik Bhaskar, Rajasthan Patrika and The Mint. He frequently appears on Indian television as a psephologist and political commentator. He has also served as an international election observer in many countries.

== Publications ==
=== Books ===
- Youth in India: Aspirations, Attitudes, Anxieties Routledge, New Delhi, 2019
- Post Mandal Politics in Bihar: Changing Electoral Patterns, SAGE, New Delhi, 2018
- Electoral Politics in India: Resurgence of the Bharatiya Janata Party (With Suhas Palshikar and Sanjay Lodha) Routledge, New Delhi, 2017
- Changing Electoral Politics in Delhi: From Caste to Class SAGE, New Delhi, 2013
- Measuring Voting Behaviour in India (With Praveen Rai), SAGE, New Delhi, 2013
- Rise of the Plebeians? The Changing Face of Indian Legislative Assemblies (With Christophe Jaffrelot), Routledge, New Delhi, 2009
- Indian Youth in a Transforming World: Attitudes and Perceptions (With Peter R de Souza and Sandeep Shastri), SAGE, New Delhi, 2009
