= Shaurya Chauhan =

Indian television actor and host

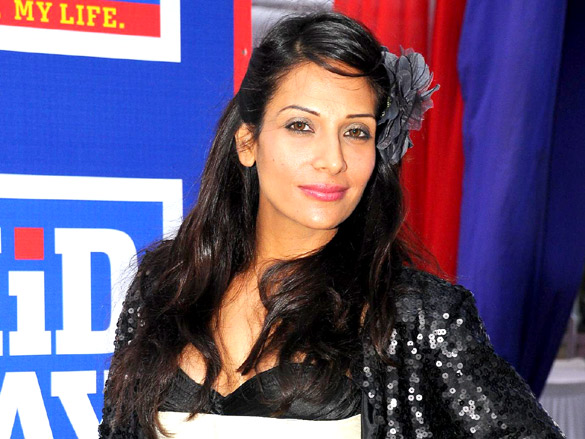
- Born: 7 August 1983; Hyderabad, Andhra Pradesh (now in Telangana), India
- Other names: Shaurya Kumar Rajput, Neelima Chauhan
- Occupations: Model, actress
- Known for: Indian Television actor, host
- Spouse: Rishi Chauhan

Shaurya Chauhan (born 7 August) is an Indian model, actress and TV host. She was one of the Kingfisher Calendar Girls for 2006. She appeared as an antagonist to Hrithik Roshan's character in Krrish 3.

== Early life ==
Shaurya Chauhan was born in Hyderabad in a Rajput family hailing from Rajasthan. She was a good gymnast during her school days and was very good at extracurricular activities like dance, play and represented her school in gymnastics.

== Career ==
She was spotted by ace lensman Atul Kasbekar and he shot her in the Kingfisher swimsuit calendar in 2006.

=== Bollywood ===
She did a small role in Kyon Ki and has played a leading role in Mumbai Salsa. She also acted in Horn 'Ok' Pleassss. She walked out of the movie, Right Yaaa Wrong. She also acted as an antagonist in Krrish 3.

== Personal life ==
She is married to Rishi Chauhan.

== Filmography ==
- Kyon Ki
- Mumbai Salsa
- Horn Ok Please
- Sadda Adda
- Krrish 3
- Ishq Ne Krazy Kiya Re
