= 1959 visit by Martin Luther King Jr. to India =

From February 3, 1959, to March 18, 1959, Martin Luther King Jr. and his wife, Coretta Scott King, left the United States for a trip to India and other locations. King was inspired by Mohandas Gandhi and his success with nonviolent activism, and as a theology student, King described Gandhi as being one of the "individuals who greatly reveal the working of the Spirit of God". King had "for a long time ... wanted to take a trip to India." After recovering for over three months from surgery following a 1958 stabbing by Izola Curry in Harlem King began to plan his trip. With assistance from Harris Wofford, the American Friends Service Committee and the Mahatma Gandhi National Memorial Trust, and funding from the Christopher Reynolds Foundation, the Montgomery Improvement Association, the Southern Christian Leadership Conference, and Dexter Avenue Baptist Church, King was able to fund the journey in early 1959.

== Trip to India ==
After having spoken to the War Resisters League in New York City, the Kings, along with Alabama State College history professor Lawrence D. Reddick, left Idlewild Airport on February 3. The party initially stopped in London and then Paris by February 6, where the party visited American-French novelist Richard Wright, who was a personal friend of Reddick, at Wright's home on 14 rue Monsieur-le-Prince. Per King, Wright "brought us up to date on European attitudes on the Negro question and gave us a taste of the best French cooking." Both King and Wright responded positively to each other, with Wright commenting to Reddick that King lacked “that preacher fakery that I always look for in those sermon-on-the-mount boys.”

The party was delayed when a flight they expected to board in Zurich bypassed the city due to fog. The travelers then flew from Zurich to Istanbul, Beirut, and then Bombay.

=== Arrival in New Delhi ===
On February 10, two days behind schedule, the party landed at Palam Airport in New Delhi, where they were welcomed by G. Ramachandran and Sucheta Kripalani. Swami Vishwananda, secretary of the Delhi branch of the Trust, while James E. Bristol, director of the Quaker Centre in New Delhi, directed the party's itinerary alongside Bayard Rustin and the Friends' meeting in Philadelphia.

Leaving Janpath Hotel in New Delhi, the party visited Teen Murti Bhavan, where they discussed the Gandhian strategy with the Prime Minister Jawaharlal Nehru and vice president Sarvepalli Radhakrishnan. Nehru also invited the party to a previously scheduled dinner with Lady Mountbatten, her daughter and Nehru’s daughter, Indira Gandhi. While in the capital, the Kings met with satyagrahis and members of the Gandhi family, and Martin spoke to students at Delhi University. After leaving New Delhi on February 13, the Kings ventured to Patna and Gaya, where Martin discussed decentralist ideologies with an independence activist Jayaprakash Narayan and visiting Bodh Gaya’s Buddhist temple, and traveled further to Calcutta and Madras. On February 20th, the Kings arrived at Gandhigram and listened to scriptures from Hindu, Muslim, Christian, and Buddhist sources, which were translated into English.

While visiting Trivandrum on February 22, the Kings received a formal reception hosted by Chief Minister E. M. S. Namboodiripad of the Kerala state government, which was the only one governed by a Communist party. Years later, Martin recounted his initial shock at being introduced by a Kerala school principal to his students as "a fellow untouchable", only to embrace the description in context of the economic poverty facing African Americans: "Yes, I am an untouchable, and every Negro in the United States of America is an untouchable". Upon visiting Cape Commorin, Martin was inspired by seeing the simultaneous sunset and moonrise on either side of Kanyakumari Pier.

On 24 February, the party arrived in Bangalore by plane, where they stayed in Mani Bhavan. On March 1, the Kings traveled to Ahmedabad, where they visited the Sabarmati Ashram. Vishwananda recalled that "the Kings had a great experience going round the hallowed place and meeting in prayer the six hundred residents", many of whom were untouchables. On 3 March, King drove to Kishangarh, where they met with Vinoba Bhave, the leader of the Bhoodan movement. On 9 March, after they returned to Delhi, Martin made a farewell address to reporters at the Gandhi National Memorial Trust, which was later broadcast on All India Radio.

=== Leaving India ===
Leaving New Delhi on 10 March, the party flew to Karachi and continued to Beirut, where they spent the night before traveling through Damascus to Jerusalem, where the Kings partook in visiting Christian pilgrimage sites along the Stations of the Cross, including the Garden of Gethsemane and the Church of the Holy Sepulchre. The party returned to New York City on March 18, where King held a press conference at the Statler Hilton Hotel. After attending a screening of The Diary of Anne Frank and visiting the home of actor Harry Belafonte, the party returned to Montgomery on March 21.

== Legacy ==
The trip deepened King's understanding of nonviolent resistance and his commitment to America's struggle for civil rights. In a radio address made during his final evening in India, King reflected, "Since being in India, I am more convinced than ever before that the method of nonviolent resistance is the most potent weapon available to oppressed people in their struggle for justice and human dignity."

Despite King asking Reddick to arrange a visit by Wright to Montgomery, the party's visit to Wright's home in Paris was the only time that the two met, as Wright died in Paris in November 1960 from amoebic dysentery symptoms.

In 1968, following King's assassination, Reddick authored With King through India: A personal memoir, Reddick's second biography of King following Crusader Without Violence (1959).

On the 50th anniversary of the visit, U.S. Secretary of State Hillary Clinton announced a congressional delegation led by Rep. John Lewis, Rep. Max Baucus, Martin Luther King III and musician Herbie Hancock to hold a commemorative retracing of the Kings' visit through India.
