= Maryam Zakaria =

Iranian-born actress and model

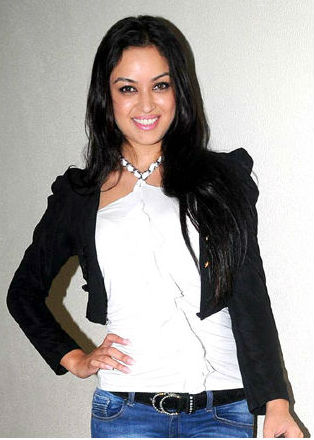
- Zakaria in 2012
- Born: Tehran, Iran
- Citizenship: Sweden
- Occupations: Model; actress
- Years active: 2009–present
- Spouse: Arvind Thakur (m. 2012)
- Children: 1

Maryam Zakaria is an Iranian-born actress and model who works in Indian films. She has appeared in Hindi, Telugu, and Tamil language films. She is best known for her work in films such as Madatha Kaja, Agent Vinod and Grand Masti.

== Career ==
In Sweden, Zakaria worked as a model, dance teacher, choreographer, and established a Bollywood dance school, the Indisk Dans Studio, which was the first dance school in Sweden to teach the "jhatkas and matkas of Bollywood cinema". She moved to Mumbai, India, in 2009 to work in Bollywood and began working as a model, appearing in various television adverts, the most notable being the adverts of Set Wet, Layz, and Coke. She also appeared in a Coca-Cola advertisement with Imran Khan.

Tamil film director Sundar C signed her to perform an item number in his film Nagaram (2010), after watching a dance video of hers on YouTube. Her performance in the hit number "Diyalo Diyala" from 100% Love was her big breakthrough. She went on to play one of the female lead characters in another Telugu film, Madatha Kaja (2011), alongside Allari Naresh. In 2012, she appeared in the item number "Dilli Ki Billi" in Muazzam Beg's film Sadda Adda.

In the Saif Ali Khan film Agent Vinod, she acted as Farah and performed a mujra in the song "Dil Mera Muft Ka" alongside Kareena Kapoor, which gave her fame in Bollywood. In 2012, she signed for Indra Kumar's movie Grand Masti, as leading actress opposite Aftab Shivdasani, which released on 13 September 2013. Grand Masti is the highest grossing Bollywood film with an A (Adults Only) certificate in India to be a big hit, subsequently entering Bollywood's 100-crore club in India. The film was declared a Super Hit in India by Box Office India.

== Personal life ==
Maryam Zakaria married choreographer Arvind Thakur in 2012. The couple had a son, Aryan Thakur, in 2013.

== Filmography ==
=== Films ===
Year	Film	Role	Language	Notes
2009	Paying Guests		Hindi	Item number
2010	Nagaram		Tamil	Item number
2011	100% Love		Telugu	Item number
2011	Brahmigadi Katha		Telugu	Item number
2011	Madatha Kaja	Priya	Telugu	
2012	Sadda Adda		Hindi	Item number
2012	Agent Vinod	Farah Faqesh	Hindi	
2012	Naa Ishtam		Telugu	Item number
2012	Dammu		Telugu	Item number
2012	Chakradhaar		Hindi	Item number
2012	Rowdy Rathore		Hindi	Item number
2013	D-Day		Hindi	Item number
2013	Bajatey Raho		Hindi	Item number
2013	Grand Masti	Rose	Hindi	
2014	Anjaan		Tamil	Item number
2016	Missing on a Weekend		Hindi	Item number
2017	Firangi		Hindi	Item number
2020	Arjuna	Shruti	Telugu	

=== Music videos ===
Year	Title	Artist	Notes
2007	"Goli"	Saeed Shayesteh	
2007	"Man Sazegaram"	Saeed Shayesteh	
2007	"Akharin Ghasam"	Saeed Shayesteh	
2008	"Ghorboni"	Saeed Shayesteh	
2009	"Jatt Di Zameen"	Preet Harpal	
2009	"Doset Daram"	Saeed Shayesteh	
2009	"Aakh Ladhde"	Jaswinder Daghima	
2009	"Mast Malanga"	Sanoj Kumar	
2010	"Khoshgeleh"	Saeed Shayesteh	
2010	"Azaaram Bedi"	Saeed Shayesteh	
2011	"Ja Ja Ve Ve"	Rishi Singh & Rajveer Dhillon	

== See also ==
- List of Iranian actresses
