= Mil Ke Bhi Hum Na Mile (TV series) =

Indian drama television series

- Genre: Drama; Romance
- Created by: Sohan Master
- Developed by: Sohan Master
- Screenplay by: Namramita Banerjee
- Story by: Dhamini Kanwal Shetty Ahsan Bakhsh; Dialogues; Yash Kumar Sharada
- Directed by: Ajay Sharma; Sukriti Das
- Creative director: Vaishakhi Banerjee
- Starring: Diksha Dhami; Adhik Mehta; Zohaib Siddiqui; Vibhanshu Dixit Manisha Saxena
- Theme music composer: Nishant Raja
- Opening theme: Milke Bhi Hum Na Mile
- Composer: Dharmesh Mistri
- Country of origin: India
- Original language: Hindi
- No. of episodes: 126

Production
- Producers: Sohan Master; Vishal Bisen(Tony Singh)
- Cinematography: Nidhin Balindra
- Editors: Sanjay Singh; Dhinesh Kumar
- Camera setup: Multi-camera
- Running time: 22-24 minutes
- Production company: Master Stroke Productions

Original release
- Network: Dangal
- Release: 19 February – 13 July 2024

Mil Ke Bhi Hum Na Mile (transl. Even Having Met, We Did Not Meet) is an Indian drama television series which aired on Dangal from 19 February 2024. It was produced by Masterstoke Productions. It currently stars Diksha Dhami, Adhik Mehta and Manisha Saxena. It formerly starred Zohaib Siddiqui and Manisha Saxena in the lead roles.

== Plot ==
Reva was only six months old when her parents separated from her, leaving her in the care of a greedy couple who exploited her luck for financial gain. They planned to marry her off to an elderly man for his wealth, but Rajveer Chauhan intervened and rescued her. As Reva grows closer to Rajveer, she discovers that he is engaged to her sister Shruti, and her own feelings for him become more complicated. Eventually Rajveer dies after getting shot leaving Reva and Shruti as widows.

=== 5 Year Later ===
Reva is shown living as a widow eventually she marries Raghav Bhansingh.

== Cast ==
=== Main ===
- Diksha Dhami as Reva Dikshit Bhansingh (formerly Chauhan): Mohan and Anu's younger / long lost daughter; Shruti's younger sister; Rajveer's widow; Raghav's wife (2024)
- Adhik Mehta as Raghav Bhansingh: Reva's second husband(2024)
- Manisha Saxena as Shruti Dikshit Chauhan: Rajveer's widow; Mohan and Anu's elder daughter; Reva's elder sister (2024)
- Zohaib Siddiqui as Rajveer Chauhan: Shruti and Reva's husband; Deepak and Kashmira's brother (2024) (Dead)
- Vibhanshu Dixit as Manav

=== Recurring ===
- Vibhanshu Dixit as Manav
- Ruby Thuukral as Dadi
- Parul Chauhan as Kashmira Chauhan: Rajveer and Deepak's elder sister (2024)
- Anjali Gupta as Anu Dixit: Reva and Shruti's mother; Mohan's wife (2024)
- Rajiv Kumar as Mohan Dixit: Reva and Shruti's father; Anu's husband (2024)
- Toral Trivedi as Nandini
- Yeshu Diman as Parul
- Bindiya Kalra
- Mohit Arora as Deepak Chauhan: Rajveer and Kashmira's brother (2024)
- Love Singh as Pramod
- Neelakshi Naithani as Lata Bhansingh: Raghav's paternal aunt

== Production ==
=== Casting ===
Manisha Saxena, Diksha Dhami, Vibhanshu Dixit and Zohaib Siddiqui were signed as the leads. The series also marks television comeback of Mohit Arora into television after 10 years.

Zohaib Siddiqui and Manisha Saxena quit the show in April 2024. All cast changed After 5 Year Leap.

=== Release ===
The series was announced on Dangal by Masterstoke Productions. Manisha Saxena, Diksha Dhami and Zohaib Siddiqui were signed as the leads. The first promo was released on 3 February 2024 featuring Manisha Saxena, Diksha Dhami and Zohaib Siddiqui. It replaced the television series Purnimaa.

== Soundtrack ==
Milke Bhi Hum Na Mile

Soundtrack album
- Released: 2023
- Genre: Romance; Soundtrack
- Length: 3:43
- Language: Hindi
- Label: Enterr10 Television Network

Tracklisting
No.	Title	Length
1.	"Milke Bhi Hum Na Mile"
Total length:		3:43

== See also ==
- List of programmes broadcast by Dangal TV
