= Manisha Saxena =

Indian model, actress, and television presenter

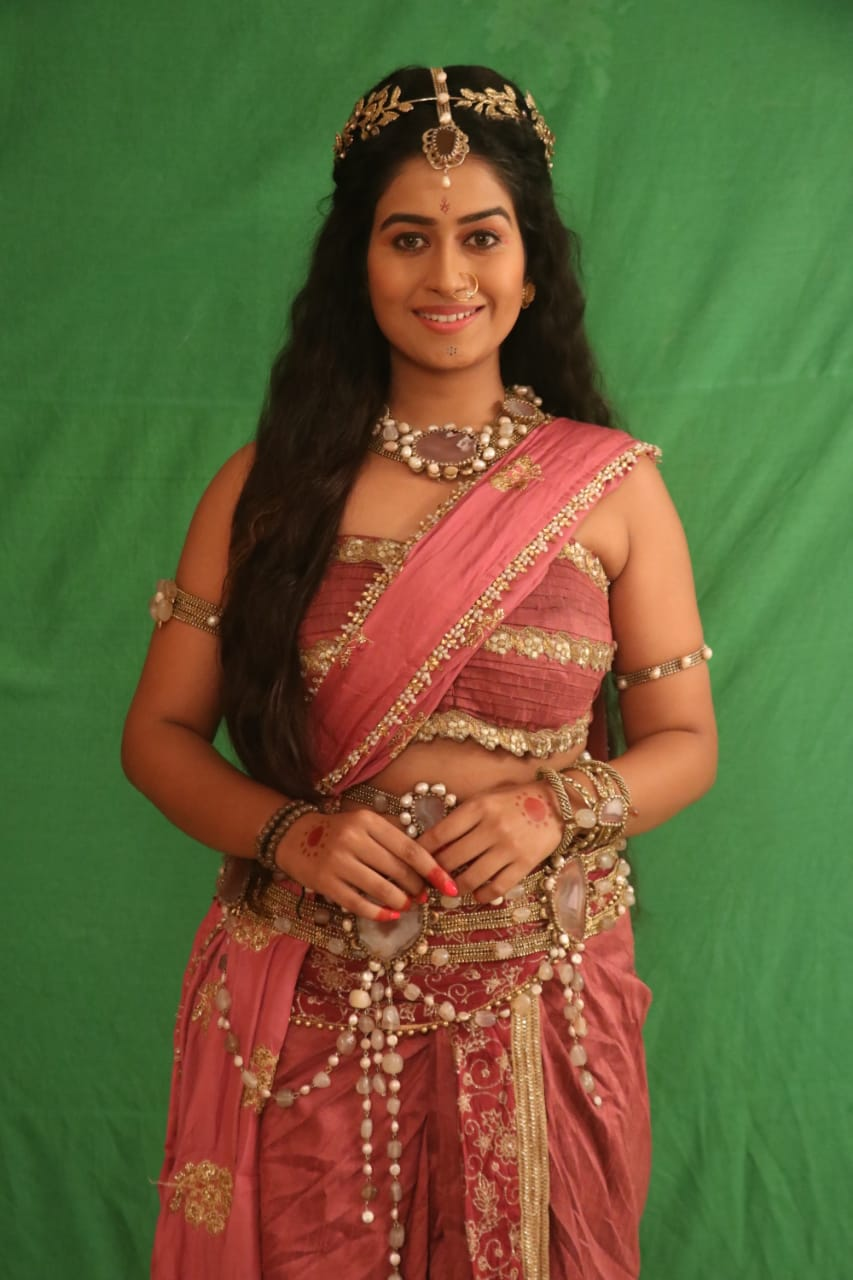
- Saxena in 2020
- Born: Pune, Maharashtra, India
- Education: University of Delhi
- Occupations: Model; actress; television presenter
- Years active: 2015–present
- Known for: MTV Love School

Manisha Saxena is an Indian model and television actress. She is known for MTV India's reality show MTV Love School. She appeared in the movie Wajah Tum Ho (2016). In 2017 she portrayed the role of Isha Singh on Pehredaar Piya Ki. She appeared on SET India television series Rishta Likhenge Hum Naya as Isha.

== Career ==
In 2017, Saxena has done SET India's television series Pehredaar Piya Ki.Parallel lead of the show . She also appeared on Rishta Likhenge Hum Naya as Isha Sajjan Singh. She appeared as Lavanya negative lead of the show on Sab Tv in Mangalam Dangalam. [S. In 2020, she starred RadhaKrishn as Jambavati (replaced Vaidehi Nayar). She was on the cover of India Today magazine.

== Television ==
Year	Show	Role	Channel
2015	MTV Love School (Season 1)	Participants	MTV India
2017	Pehredaar Piya Ki	Isha	SET India
2017–2018	Rishta Likhenge Hum Naya	Isha	SET India
2018–2019	Mangalam Dangalam	Lavanya	Sony SAB
2020–2021	RadhaKrishn	Queen Jambavati	Star Bharat
2021– 2023	Mann Sundar	Ritu	Dangal TV
2024	Mil Ke Bhi Hum Na Mile	Shruti Dixit	Dangal TV
2025	Prem Leela	Bijli	Dangal TV

== Filmography ==
Year	Title	Role	Notes
2016	Wajah Tum Ho	Rahul's Secretary	Debut
