= Karanvir Sharma =

Indian Bollywood and Television actor

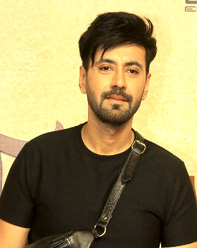
- Sharma in 2025
- Born: Mumbai, Maharashtra, India
- Occupation: Actor
- Years active: 2012–present
- Known for: A Thursday, The Trial S2, Shaurya Aur Anokhi Ki Kahani

Karanvir Sharma is an Indian actor who predominantly works in Hindi films and television productions. He is best known for his role as Shaurya Sabherwal in Star Plus's romantic drama series Shaurya Aur Anokhi Ki Kahani.

== Career ==
He debuted with the film Sadda Adda. Other film roles include Zid (2014), Azhar (2016), and Shaadi Mein Zaroor Aana (2017). He made his television debut with Colors TV's 24. He later featured in Siyaasat, Girl in the City Chapter 2 and Haq Se. In 2018, he played the role of Nagarjuna Kutty in the SAB TV's Mangalam Dangalam. He came into prominence through his portrayal of Shaurya Sabherwal in StarPlus's Shaurya Aur Anokhi Ki Kahani. He was seen playing a lawyer in the 2022 Bollywood movie "A Thursday" opposite "Yami Gautam".

== Filmography ==
=== Television ===
Year	Title	Role	Notes	Ref.
2014	Siyaasat	Prince Salim (Emperor Jahangir)	Season 1	
2016	24	Raj Singh Bhakta	Season 2	
2017	Girl In The City	Kiran Bhatija	Chapter 2	
2018	Haq Se	Raghu Thapar		
2018	Mangalam Dangalam	Arjun alias Nagarjuna Kutty		
2020–2021	Shaurya Aur Anokhi Ki Kahani	Shaurya Sabherwal		
2021	Love Sorries	Annirudh		
2022–2024	Rabb Se Hai Dua	Haider Akhtar		
2023	Hunter Tootega Nahi Todega	IPS Sajid Sheikh		
2024–2025	Safal Hogi Teri Aradhana	Madhav Bhardwaj		

=== Films ===
Year	Title	Role	Notes	Ref.
2012	Sadda Adda	Sameer Khanna		
2014	Zid	Rohan "Ronnie" Achrekar		
2016	Azhar	Manoj Shinde		
2017	Shaadi Mein Zaroor Aana	Sharad	Cameo appearance	
2019	Blank	Rohit		
2022	A Thursday	Rohit Mirchandani		

=== Music videos ===
Year	Title	Singer
2017	"Tera Intzaar"	Roopesh Saitwal
2021	"Haare Hum Haare"	Altaaf Sayyed and Aaniya Sayyed
2021	"Jo Tera Howega" (Cover)	Debattama Saha
2021	"Aankhein Band Karke"	Abhi Dutt
2022	"Mubarak Ho"	Soham Naik
