= Mangalam Dangalam =

Indian TV series

- Genre: Sitcom
- Country of origin: India
- Original language: Hindi
- No. of seasons: 1
- No. of episodes: 99

Production
- Camera setup: Multi camera
- Running time: 22 minutes
- Production company: Vineyard Films

Original release
- Network: SAB TV
- Release: 13 November 2018 – 29 March 2019

Mangalam Dangalam (transl. Welfare and hardship) is an Indian Hindi serial based on the quarrels between a man and his father-in-law. Its broadcast began on 13 November 2018 on SAB TV. Karanvir Sharma, Manoj Joshi and Manisha Saxena played the main characters in the series.

== Plot ==
This story is about the love and struggling, comical relationship of a father-in-law and his son-in-law, resulting from an intercaste marriage. A rich businessman hailing from Indore, Sanjeev Sanklecha’s daughter, Rumi and Arjun, a Malayali lawyer, fall in love with each other. When Rumi and Arjun reveal about their love to their families, all are happy except for Rumi's father and Arjun's mother, Charulata. However, after a lot of difficulties and challenges, the couple gets their respective families to agree to the marriage and Sanjeev reluctantly says yes to the proposal, although he is overprotective and still has doubts in his mind regarding Arjun’s capabilities to keep Rumi happy, secretly planning to stop the marriage.

Charulata also dislikes the Sanklechas and plans to ruin the wedding and break the couple. She calls Arjun’s obsessed and vengeful ex-girlfriend Lavanya, who tries to create misunderstandings between the families but her plots fail and Charulata realises she is not the right girl for Arjun and accepts Rumi as her daughter-in-law. Lavanya ends up kidnapping Arjun on the wedding day to marry him herself but the families come together and find him in time, while Lavanya is arrested.

After all the drama, both of them get married, but Sanjeev plays a heart attack drama to stop Rumi from leaving his house. Charulata learns about Sanjeev's conspiracy, takes a drastic step and comes to live in Sanjeev's house with her family. In the end, everything sorts out well between Sanjeev and Arjun eventually, after Arjun saves the Sanklecha family from a financial issue. The whole family decides to get Arjun and Rumi remarried and for Rumi to finally move into her sasural with her father’s blessing and acceptance. It is revealed that Lalitha (Arjun’s sister) and Sahil (Rumi’s brother) have also developed feelings for each other. Everything ends well.

== Characters ==
- Manoj Joshi - Sanjeev Sanklecha: Mrs Sanklecha's son; Sangeeta's husband; Rumi and Sahil's father
- Karanvir Sharma - Nagarjuna "Arjun" Kutty: Venkatesh and Charulata's son; Lalita's brother;Rumi's husband
- Manisha Rawat - Rumi Sanklecha Kutty: Sanjeev and Sangeeta's daughter; Mrs Sanklecha's granddaughter; Arjun's wife, Sahil's sister
- Anjali Gupta - Sangeeta Sanklecha: Sanjeev's wife;Rumi and Sahil's mother
- Anita Kulkarni - Charulata Kutty: Venkatesh's wife; Arjun and Lalita's mother
- Abhay Kulkarni - Venkatesh Kutty: Charulata's husband; Arjun and Lalita's father
- Shubha Khote - Mrs Sanklecha: Sanjeev's mother; Rumi and Sahil's grandmother
- Kritika Sharma/ Aparna Mishra - Lalita Kutty: Venkatesh and Charulata's daughter; Arjun's sister, Sahil's Love Interest
- Pravisht Mishra - Sahil Sanklecha: Sanjeev and Sangeeta's son; Mrs Sanklecha's grandson; Rumi's brother, Lalita's Love Interest
