= Teesri Aankh: The Hidden Camera =

Teesri Aankh
- Theatrical release poster
- Directed by: Harry Baweja
- Screenplay by: Harry Baweja
- Dialogues by: Pathik Vats
- Story by: Harry Baweja
- Produced by: Pammi Baweja
- Starring: Sunny Deol; Amisha Patel; Neha Dhupia; Aarti Chhabria; Mukesh Rishi; Aashish Chaudhary; Mukesh Tiwari; Murli Sharma
- Cinematography: Chirantan Das; Ayananka Bose
- Edited by: Merzin Tavaria
- Music by: Songs: Sukhshinder Shinda; Nitz 'N' Sony; Harry Anand; Score: Amar Mohile
- Production company: Baweja Movies Pvt. Ltd
- Release date: 3 March 2006
- Running time: 109 minutes
- Country: India
- Language: Hindi

Teesri Aankh: The Hidden Camera (transl. The Third Eye) is a 2006 Indian action thriller film directed by Harry Baweja starring Sunny Deol (in an extended guest appearance) and Amisha Patel, along with Neha Dhupia, Aashish Chaudhary (in a extended special appearance), Aarti Chhabria and Mukesh Rishi. It was a box office failure.

== Plot ==
Sudama Pandey is a notorious criminal who runs a global operation of capturing women on camera. He operates out of London and is assisted by his two partners in crime.

Be it a honeymoon bedroom, changing rooms, or girls' hostels, none of these places misses the third eye—the eye of a camera. First, they capture girls on film and blackmail them, then abuse them, both physically and mentally.

One girl who gets trapped by them is Sapna, an air hostess. She is a lovely girl who has dreams of making it big in her career. She found the love of her life through her fiancé, Arjun Singh. Sudama installs hidden cameras in her changing room and blackmails her into doing blue films in exchange for the hidden camera footage he took of her. Sudama does nasty things to her but gives her the film afterwards. She is brutally murdered by Sudama's gang not long after.

The murder is witnessed by Ammu, who tries to rescue Sapna, but her efforts are in vain. Ammu is traumatized by the events, but soon finds herself in danger as Sudama begins plotting to kill her.

Meanwhile, Ammu's sister Aarti and her partner Rahul are searching for Sapna after her disappearance. Arjun, who turns out to be an ACP in Mumbai, is also seeking his fiancée's whereabouts, investigating Sudama, as he was the last person seen with her. His investigation leads him to London, where the only clue that could give him any answers turns out to be the sole witness, Ammu.

Unfortunately, Ammu herself has gone missing. He makes every possible attempt to find her but reaches a dead end. Without Ammu, he has nowhere else to turn. The race is on to find her and solve the case. But it won't be easy, because Arjun just doesn't have to fight criminals – he also has to fight technology.

== Cast ==
- Sunny Deol as ACP Arjun Singh (extended guest appearance)
- Ameesha Patel as Ammu
- Mukesh Rishi as Sudama Pandey
- Neha Dhupia as Sapna
- Aarti Chhabria as Aarti
- Aashish Chaudhary (extended special appearance) as Rahul Mishra
- Mukesh Tiwari as Dinesh 1
- Murli Sharma as Dinesh 2
- Ayub Khan as Inspector Vikram
- Ravi Kale as Parshad Shinde
- Jazzy B as Himself in song “Chug De Punjabi”

== Music and soundtrack ==
The music for the film’s songs was composed by Sukhshinder Shinda, Nitz 'N' Sony and Harry Anand. The lyrics of the songs were penned by Sameer, Karamjeet Kadhowala, Nitin Arora and Earl D’Souza. The background score of the film was done by Amar Mohile.

One of the songs, "Assi Teri Gul Karni", by Harry Anand, is inspired from Pakistani pop singer Abrar Ul Haq’s song "Assan Jana Mall-o Mall" from the namesake album. The Lounge Version of "Sharabiyon" rendered by Asha Bhonsle, composed by newcomers Nitz 'N' Sony, was on the BBC Charts; and is a part of the Platinum Collection of 8 Life Time Best Songs by Asha Bhonsle. The Lyrics of "Sharabiyon" were written by Nitin "Nitz" Arora himself.

=== Track listing ===
#	Title	Singer(s)	Music director	Length
1	"Chug De Punjabi"	Jazzy B	Sukhshinder Shinda	4:04
2	"Assi Teri Gul Karni"	Sonu Nigam & Suzanne D'Mello	Harry Anand	3:40
3	"Titliyan Titliyan"	Sonu Nigam & Shweta Pandit	Harry Anand	5:09
4	"Sharabiyon"	Asha Bhosle	Nitin Arora & Sony Chandy	5:01
5	"Assi Teri Gul Karni" (Remix)	Sonu Nigam & Suzanne D'Mello	Harry Anand	3:32
6	"Titliyan Titliyan" (Remix)	Sonu Nigam & Shweta Pandit	Harry Anand	4:32
7	"Sharabiyon" (Lounge Mix)	Asha Bhosle	Nitin Arora & Sony Chandy	5:10
