= Pathik Vats =

Indian film maker and writer

Pathik Vats also known as U. S. Pathik and Umashankar Pathik is an Indian film maker and writer. He was born in Patauda - a village in Haryana. Later his family moved to Delhi. He graduated from Ramjas College of the University of Delhi.

Pathik started his career as an assistant director to filmmaker Mrinal Sen for his film Genesis starring Nasserudin Shah, Om Puri and Shabana Azmi. Pathik also wrote the dialogues with Mr. S.P. Singh for this Indo-French project which was in the official selection of Festival de Cannes.

Pathik was honored in the Filmfare Awards in the best dialogues category for Aamir Khan's blockbuster Sarfarosh. He was also the associate director of Sarfarosh. Pathik was also nominated for Screen Awards, International Indian Film Academy, Sansui and Zee Cine Awards in the Best Dialogue.

His other films as a dialogue writer include Mazhab, Qayamat: City Under Threat, Kannad film Cyanide, Teesri Aankh: The Hidden Camera, and Khushboo.

He was honored by the Maharashtra State Hindi Academy and Kavi Pradeep Foundation for his documentary film Chal Akela for Doordarshan which was on the life of 'Kavi Pradeep' who penned the iconic song "Aye mere watan ke logo".

Recently, Pathik wrote the dialogue for Chaar Sahibzaade 3D.
