= Money Hai Toh Honey Hai =

2008 Indian film by Ganesh Acharya

- Theatrical release poster
- Directed by: Ganesh Acharya
- Screenplay by: Muazzam Beg
- Story by: Muazzam Beg
- Produced by: Kumar Mangat Pathak
- Starring: Govinda; Aftab Shivdasani; Hansika Motwani; Celina Jaitly; Manoj Bajpayee; Ravi Kishan; Antara Biswas; Upen Patel
- Cinematography: Sriram
- Edited by: Ballu Saluja
- Music by: Songs: Nitz 'N' Sony (Nitin Arora and Sony Chandy); Background Score: Sandeep Shirodkar
- Production company: Big Screen Entertainment
- Distributed by: Eros International
- Release date: 25 July 2008
- Running time: 142 minutes
- Country: India
- Language: Hindi

Money Hai Toh Honey Hai (transl. If You've Got the Money, You've Got the Honey) is a 2008 Indian comedy film directed by Ganesh Acharya and produced by Kumar Mangat Pathak. It features a cast of stars including Govinda, Aftab Shivdasani, Upen Patel, Hansika Motwani, Celina Jaitly and Manoj Bajpayee in the lead roles with Ravi Kishan, Antara Biswas and Prem Chopra in supporting roles. Esha Deol and the director of the film Ganesh Acharya make special appearances.

== Plot ==
Money Hai Toh Honey Hai tells the story of six people, each facing their own struggles. Bobby Arora is a carefree young man who runs away from home in search of adventure. Lallabhai becomes wealthy after winning the lottery, but loses all his money when his business fails. Gaurav is a copywriter who has just been dismissed from his job. Manik is a struggling model who sleeps with a middle-aged fashion designer in the hope of becoming successful. Ashima Kapoor is a successful television star, but she is unhappy with her career and wants to act in films. Shruti is a struggling dress designer.

One day, all six receive a text message informing them that they are now the owners of Shahenshah Jaiswal's 10-billion-rupee company. However, their happiness is short-lived when they discover that the company owes 1.2 billion rupees. They are placed under house arrest until the debt is repaid.

The six friends decide to use surplus fabric left over from a failed shipment to South Korea to make affordable garments for ordinary people. They showcase these designs in a fashion show, which proves to be a success. The bank agrees to help them repay the debt, enabling them to revive the company.

The film ends with Bobby and Ashima getting married.

== Cast ==
- Govinda as Bobby Arora
- Aftab Shivdasani as Gaurav Negi
- Hansika Motwani as Ashima Kapoor / Meera Bharucha
- Celina Jaitly as Shruti Badola
- Manoj Bajpayee as Lallabhai Bharodia
- Ravi Kishan as Parag Batra
- Antara Biswas as Manish Sarraf's Wife
- Upen Patel as Manikchand 'Manik' Khiralal
- Prem Chopra as Krishnakumar / Shehenshah Jaiswal
- Archana Puran Singh as Dolly
- Kim Sharma as Sara Das
- Priyanka Sharma as Anjali Sukhani
- Javaid Sheikh as Prakash Arora, Bobby's Father
- Ketki Dave as Aarti Arora, Bobby's Mother
- Kurush Deboo as Production Supervisor
- Shruti Sharma as Sakkubai
- Paresh Ganatra as Chaman Patel
- Viju Khote as Jaiswal's Doctor
- Rakhi Vijan as Mukti Kapoor (Ashima's boss)
- Nitin Arora as Bhola Plumber
- Esha Deol (Special appearance in song Ta Na Na)
- Ganesh Acharya (Special appearance in song "Chhuriyaan")
- Om Puri as a Narrator
- Vicky Sidana as Ravan
- Sumit Arora as Traffic Constable
- Raju Mavani as Mr.Wadhwa
- Snehal Sahay

== Music ==
The album has eight tracks including one instrumental, composed by Nitz 'N' Sony (Nitin Arora and Sony Chandy).

=== Track listings ===
| # | Title | Singer(s) | Length |
|---|---|---|---|
| 1 | "Money Hai Toh Honey Hai" | Harshdeep Kaur, Nitin Arora, Sony Chandy | 3:31 |
| 2 | "Awaara Dil" | Adnan Sami, Shruti Pathak, Ishq Bector, Arya, Bob, Nitin Arora, Sony Chandy, Shantanu Hudlikar | 4:23 |
| 3 | "Chhuriyaan" | Sunidhi Chauhan, Labh Janjua | 4:57 |
| 4 | "Ta Na Na" | Kunal Ganjawala, Rekha Bhardwaj, Earl, Arya, Nitin Arora, Sony Chandy | 4:34 |
| 5 | "Rangeeli Raat" | Daler Mehndi, Sunidhi Chauhan, Master Saleem, Arya | 4:45 |
| 6 | "No Big Deal" | Suraj Jagan | 5:29 |
| 7 | "Dance Master" | Shaan, Shivamani | 4:24 |
| 8 | "Hope" (Instrumental) | | 5:30 |

== Reception ==
=== Critical reception ===
Rajeev Masand of CNN-IBN rated it 2/5: "Sorely lacking in drama and genuine humour, Money Hai Toh Honey is mind-numbingly dull because there’s no conflict or plot progression, and everything seems to fall into place too conveniently, which even ruins the amazing comedy at the first half!"

Mayank Shekhar of Hindustan Times rated it 2.5/5: "Scenes may well be dull and weak in parts. And they are. But for a comedy film, it needs to have some more sense-of-humor".

Raja Sen of Rediff rated it 1.5/5: "This is, first and foremost, a tacky film. The tastelessness flowing right down into the script, however, makes for a very different league of disaster."

Taran Adarsh of Bollywood Hungama rated it 2/5: "Money Hai Toh Honey Hai is a poor show. Watch the first half and laugh your total head-off, but at the second half, try to enjoy a damp squib!"

Nikhat Kazmi of The Times of India gave it the highest rating it got: 3.5/5: "Money Hai Toh Honey made a complete laugh-riot in the first part, but soon after the interval a lot of drama and romance jumps in which is totally something you don't need in a comedy movie, it needed a much smarter script to keep the laughter ringing".
