= Pawan Chopra =

Indian actor

- Occupation: Actor
- Years active: 2001–present

Pawan Chopra is an Indian actor known for playing roles in Hindi films, television serials, web series and commercials.

== Work ==
Pawan Chopra has done supporting roles in Bollywood fims like Shaapit, Phantom, Sonu Ke Titu Ki Sweety etc. He has also worked in television serials such as Mere Angne Main and Kuch Rang Pyaar Ke Aise Bhi and web series such as The Family Man.

== Filmography ==
=== Films ===
Year	Title	Role		Ref(s)
2001	Moksha: Salvation			
2003	Tehzeeb			
2005	Karam	Major		
2006	Neal 'N' Nikki	Mr Bakshi		
2008	Black & White	Police officer		
2010	Shaapit			
2013	Once Upon a Time in Mumbai Dobaara!	Commentator		
2014	Million Dollar Arm	Coach		
2014	Yaan	Arab Prosecutor	Tamil film	
2014	Ungli	Prosecution Lawyer		
2015	Dil Dhadakne Do	Prem Mehra		
2015	Phantom	ISI Agent		
2015	Rodina	Svyashchennik		
2016	Airlift	Indian Ambassador Brij		
2017	Chef	Sunil Manohri		
2018	Baazaar	Zulfikar		
2018	Sonu Ke Titu Ki Sweety	Titu's Father		
2019	Kalank	Roop's Father		
2019	Saand Ki Aankh	Jai Singh Tomar		
2020	Mumbai Saga	Commissioner Mario		
2021	Shershaah	G.L Batra, Vikram Batra's father		
2022	Beast	Madhav Singh	Tamil film	
2022	Sita Ramam	Pakistani General Musa Khan	Telugu film	
2024	Bade Miyan Chote Miyan	Defence Secretary		
2024	Vijay 69			

=== Television ===
Year	Title	Role	Ref(s)
2001–04	Kaahin Kissii Roz	Akash	
2005	Raat Hone Ko Hai		
2006–08	Aek Chabhi Hai Padoss Mein	Naresh Gupta	
2006–08	Raavan	Kuber	
2007–09	Maayka	Yashwant Sareen	
2009–10	Bairi Piya	Mr. Virat Pundir	
2009–11	Bhagyavidhaata	Mr. Verma	
2012	Byah Hamari Bahu Ka		
2015–17	Mere Angne Mein	Anupam Mathur	
2016–17	Kuch Rang Pyar Ke Aise Bhi	Mr. Gujral	
2017–2018	Prithvi Vallabh - Itihaas Bhi, Rahasya Bhi	Raja Singhdant	
2019	The Family Man	Sharma	

=== Web series ===
Year	Title	Role	Platform	Notes
2019–present	The Family Man	Sharma	Amazon Prime Video	
2020	Asur	Shashank Awasthi	Voot	
2020	Poison 2	Commissioner	ZEE5	
2021	Little Things	Dhruv's Father	Netflix	
2023	Hunter Tootega Nahi Todega		ZEE5	
2024	Freedom at Midnight	Maulana Abul Kalam Azad	SonyLIV	
