= Sadda Adda =

- Theatrical release poster
- Directed by: Muazzam Beg
- Written by: Muazzam Beg
- Produced by: Rajeev Agarwal, Tarun R. Agarwal
- Starring: Karanvir Sharma; Shaurya Chauhan; Bhaumik Sampat; Kadambari Jethwani; Rohin Robert; Rohit Arora; Kunal Panth; Parimal Aloknath; Raghuminati; Maryam Zakaria
- Cinematography: Harvey Glen
- Edited by: Sandeep Singh Bajeli
- Music by: Shamir Tandon, A Band of Boys, Ramji Gulati
- Distributed by: Rajtaru Studios Ltd
- Release date: 13 January 2012
- Running time: 107 minutes
- Country: India
- Language: Hindi

Sadda Adda (transl. Our spot) is a 2012 Indian comedy film directed by Muazzam Beg. The film was Muazzam Beg's directorial debut. Sadda Adda was produced by Rajeev Agarwal, Ramesh Agarwal and Tarun Agarwal, under the banner of Rajtaru Studios Limited.

== Plot ==
The film depicts how 5 bachelors live together, despite their completely different backdrops and personalities like bihari Safal Yadav Manpaur (Madhubani). Their home, which they call "Sadda Adda", is an absolute mess of beer bottles, dirty clothes, and mattresses, yet together, they carry out the tasks of cooking, cleaning and paying the rent, while sharing laughter and tears, and always standing up for each other like a family. "Sadda Adda" starts as a temporary room to assist them while they work towards their dreams, but turns out to become their true home. The movie starts one morning where all the friends are starting their day with arguments. It goes on to show the struggles they face individually, and how they fight for their dreams. Safal kill himself after failing his PCS exams. In the end Sameer becomes an executive in an MNC, while Irfan starts his own Architectural firm. It is indicated that Jogi continues his job and travels abroad. Rajat reunites with others coming back from USA with wife.

== Cast ==
- Karanvir Sharma as Sameer Khanna
- Shaurya Chauhan as Shreya Gujral
- Bhaumik Sampat as Irfan Habib
- Kadambari Jethwani as Ridhima
- Rohin Robert as Rajat Hooda
- Rohit Arora as Jogi
- Kunal Panth as Kabir Asthana
- Parimal Alok as Safal Yadav
- Raghuminati as Tinku

== Production ==
The trailer was released with movie ‘Rockstar’ in theatres. The producers promoted the film with a rock concert at Bhavans College in Andheri, Mumbai. Big Digital division of Reliance Broadcasting Network Ltd has acquired the official music rights.

== Soundtrack ==
Background score by Vladimir Persan, Songs was composed by Shamir Tandon, A Band of Boys and Ramji Gulati, with lyrics by Prashant Pandey, Sandeep Nath, Ramji Gulati, Shamir Tandon and Karan Oberoi.

=== Track list ===
#	Song	Singer(s)	Length
1	"Sarphira"	Shahid Mallya	04:18
2	"Sadda Adda" (Acoustic)	Raaj, Shahid Mallya, Ahan Shah	04:22
3	"Dilli Ki Billi"	Sunidhi Chauhan, Neeraj Shridhar	03:29
4	"Aao Saaf Karein"	A Band of Boys	02:58
5	"Sadda Adda"	Raaj, Shahid Mallya, Ahan Shah	03:29
6	"Sarphira" (Lounge Mix)	Shahid Mallya	04:31
7	"Dilli Ki Billi" (Remix)	Sunidhi Chauhan, Neeraj Shridhar	03:56
8	"Dosti"	Ramji Gulati	04:09
9	"Lecture Bunk Karna"	Ramji Gulati	04:39
10	"Dosti" (Remix)	Ramji Gulati	03:25

== Reception ==
IndiaTimes rated it 2.5 out of 5. It noted inconsistent direction, story and performances but praised the issues covered. Mayank Shekhar of Hindustan Times rated it 2 out of 5. Dainik Bhaskar found the second half better than the first one. It praised direction and performances.
