= Swami (2007 film) =

- DVD cover
- Directed by: Ganesh Acharya
- Screenplay by: Bhavani Iyer; Muazzam Beg
- Story by: Ganesh Acharya
- Produced by: Pushpa Krishna Creations
- Starring: Manoj Bajpayee; Juhi Chawla
- Narrated by: Amitabh Bachchan
- Cinematography: Lenin Xavier
- Edited by: Kuldip Mehan
- Music by: Nitz 'N' Sony
- Release date: 8 June 2007
- Country: India
- Language: Hindi

Swami is a 2007 Indian Hindi drama film, directed and choreographed by Ganesh Acharya with screenplay by Bhavani Iyer and Muazzam Beg. The main cast consists of Juhi Chawla and Manoj Bajpai. In a first of its kind attempt, the background music score of Swami was recorded before shooting the film. The music of this film is by Nitz 'N' Sony. They are the first musicians to have recorded a Folk Ganpati Mandal (The Best in Maharashtra), live in 5.1 channels, overnight in an open-air makeshift studio, constructed specifically in Film City Mumbai for the movie. This is the only 5.1 recording of a Folk Ganpati Mandal ever done. The film was released to negative reviews.

== Plot ==
The title is based on the name of the protagonist in the movie, Swami. The story throws light on the day-to-day life of a common man and his dreams. Swami is a poor man who works in a jewellery shop and hardly earns a living. After his marriage to Radha, he moves to Mumbai from his hometown, where Radha gives birth to their son and daughter.The couple names him Anand. Anand establishes intelligence and wisdom at an early age, and the couple is delighted at their young son. As time passes, the couple realises the importance of academic education and learns that a person can earn a good living in America, but proper education is required to go to America. Radha wants Anand to fulfill this dream for her. The couple tries to get Anand admitted to one of the best schools in town, where Anand is initially denied admission, as Swami and Radha are not very highly educated. The young Anand then himself speaks with the principal and reveals the dream of his parents and requests her to give admission to him. The principal, moved by Anand's innocence, gives him admission.

Swami notices a rocking chair in an antique furniture shop and finds it very attractive. However, the chair is too expensive for him, costing 18,500 rupees. Radha notices it and wishes that she could buy that chair for Swami. While sending Anand to school, Radha has stomach pain. Swami takes her to a doctor, where she is diagnosed with bilateral renal artery stenosis, which can be successfully treated by a simple operation. The couple inquires about the cost of the operation, which is 25,000 rupees. Swami does not lose hope and starts saving money for Radha's surgery. He saves the money in a box. One day, Swami reaches home and finds the same antique chair at home. He quickly figures out that Radha had taken the savings and immediately checks the box in which he used to save money and finds it empty. He is upset over Radha's behaviour but is moved by the love she has for him. He again starts saving money so that he can get Radha operated upon.

A few days later, Radha experiences severe pain in her stomach. Swami, upon reaching home in the evening, finds Radha in a bad state and inquires about her health. Radha asks Swami to sit on the chair she bought for him and discloses her desire for Anand to settle in America, and while talking to Swami, she passes away. Swami takes the wish as her last wish.

In due course of time, Anand grows up into a handsome young lad and is working in a multinational bank and is also looking forward to settling in the U.S. He is in love with Pooja and wishes to marry her and informs his father, who agrees to their wedding. Sometime later, Pooja gives birth to a beautiful baby boy named Adarsh. Swami is delighted and spends more time with his grandson.

After playing cricket outside, Adarsh comes home and starts running around in the house. He accidentally trips over Swami's rocking chair, which results in a cut on his forehead, and it starts bleeding. Pooja is very angry and screams at Swami. Out of anger, she sells the rocking chair while Swami is away. Swami returns home to find the chair missing and is upset but quiet about it. Anand comes home from work to find the chair is missing. Pooja realises what she has done and asks for forgiveness and rushes out to get the chair back from the shop owner, but finds out later that the chair has already been sold. Swami forgives Pooja, but that night he cannot go to sleep.

Anand finally gets the opportunity to go to America, which delights his father, and they make preparations to go there. When Anand goes to his boss, he finds out that his father doesn't get a visa to America. He decides that since his father cannot go, he will not go. Pooja firmly agrees with him. Swami overhears this and decides he will live in a care home and gets a place for one, but Anand doesn't want to leave him. However, Swami tries to tell him that this was what his mother wanted.

In the end, Swami is waving goodbye to his son and daughter-in-law tearfully. He goes inside a room, which seems to be the room in that old age home he was planning to live after his son's departure, and finds his rocking chair, and at this point, he realises that Radha knew it belonged to him when she was on her deathbed. The film ends with Swami crying and hugging the chair.

== Cast ==
- Manoj Bajpayee as Swami
- Juhi Chawla as Radha
- Maninder Singh as Anand
- Neha Pendse as Pooja
- Vivek Shauq as Waman Pandit
- Amey Pandya as Gotiya
- Deep as Pandu
- Nevil

== Soundtrack ==
The music was composed by Nitz 'N' Sony, and the songs were sung by K.S.Chithra & Hariharan.

== Critical reception ==
A critic from The Times of India wrote that "Needless to say, the highpoint of this senti soap are the performances by the lead actors". A critic from Bollywood Hungama rated the film two-and-a-half out of five stars and wrote that "SWAMI marks the birth of a sensitive storyteller -- Ganesh Acharya. The film is rich in emotions and that's one thing that can never go out of fashion." A critic from Hindustan Times wrote that "The direction is straight and simple. Bajpai and Chawla are always a delight to watch. The trouble is that eventually the narrative is too darn earnest, jilebi sweet and cripplingly slow."
