= Hunter Tootega Nahi Todega =

Indian web series

- Genre: Action
- Directed by: Prince Dhiman; Alok Batra
- Starring: Suniel Shetty; Esha Deol; Barkha Bisht; Rahul Dev; Karanvir Sharma; Teena Singh
- Country of origin: India
- Original language: Hindi
- No. of seasons: 2
- No. of episodes: 14

Production
- Executive producers: Akshay Valsangkar; Aashish Mehra; Anurodh Gusan
- Producers: Vikram Mehra; Siddharth Anand Kumar; Sahil Sharma
- Cinematography: Jesil Patel, Vivek Patne
- Running time: 25-27 minutes
- Production companies: Saregama; Yoodlee Films

Original release
- Network: Amazon miniTV
- Release: 22 March 2023

Hunter: Tootega Nahi Todega is an Indian-Hindi language web series created and directed by Prince Dhiman and Alok Batra, and produced under Saregama and Yoodlee Films. The series stars Suniel Shetty, Esha Deol, Barkha Bisht, Karanvir Sharma, and Rahul Dev. It is streaming on Amazon Mini TV.

== Premise ==
ACP Vikram Chauhan, a cop with a tragic past, is accused of an aged woman Leena Thomas's death, where he sets out to prove his innocence with the help of Divya.

== Cast ==
- Suniel Shetty as ACP Vikram Chauhan
- Esha Deol as Divya
- Barkha Bisht as Swati
- Rahul Dev as Hooda Kartoos
- Karanvir Sharma as Inspector Sajid Shaikh
- Pawan Chopra
- Manish Dallvi as Police Constable
- Smita Jayakar
- Mihir Ahuja
- Siddharth Kher
- Rahul Sahu
- Harssh A Singh
- Enakshi Ganguly
- Teena Singh
- Jackie Shroff in a cameo appearance

== Production ==
The series was announced by Saregama on Amazon miniTV consisting of eight episodes. Suniel Shetty, Esha Deol, Barkha Bisht Sengupta, Karanvir Sharma, and Rahul Dev were cast to appear in the series.

The trailer of the series was released in March 2023.

== Music ==
No.	Title	Lyrics	Music	Singer(s)	Length
1.	"Daiyya Daiyya"	Siddhant Kaushal	Haroon-Gavin	Neha Kakkar	3:16

== Reception ==
Deepa Gahlot for Rediff.com wrote "The show is slick -- that much can be expected these days -- with a lot of bloodshed but mercifully, not too much vulgar swearing."

Archika Khurana of The Times of India wrote "What works in show's favour are the well-choreographed action sequences, which allow the slomos to feel how hard he is beating the sh*t out of people. Suniel Shetty is simply unbeatable at beating people and performing action stunts."

Roktim Rajpal of India Today wrote "Hunter Tootega Nahi Todega features remixed versions of popular Bollywood chartbusters."
