= Ganesh Acharya =

Indian choreographer

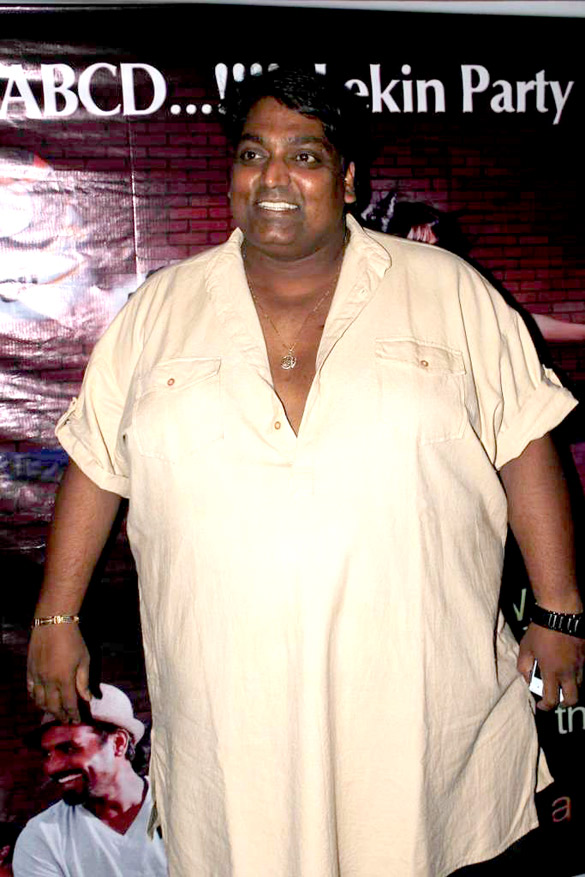
- Born: 23 May 1971 (age 55); Mumbai, Maharashtra, India
- Citizenship: India
- Occupations: Choreographer, Film director, Actor
- Spouse: Vidhi Acharya (m.2000)
- Awards: National Film Award For Best Choreography

Ganesh Acharya is an Indian choreographer, director and actor who works in Hindi cinema.

He won the National Film Award for Best Choreography for the songs "Hawan Kund" from Bhaag Milkha Bhaag (2013) and "Gori tu lath mar" from Toilet: Ek Prem Katha (2017). At the 61st Filmfare Awards, he was nominated for the Best Choreographer award for the song "Malhaari" from Bajirao Mastani (2015).

== Personal life ==
Ganesh was born into a Tamil family in Madras, India. In November 2000, Ganesh married film producer Vidhi Acharya.

== Career ==
Ganesh started his career as an assistant and founded his own dance company at the age of 12. He then became a choreographer and worked in his first film, Anaam, in 1992.

He was nominated for Best Choreography for Badi Mushkil song from Lajja (2001), in the Screen Weekly Awards in 2002. In 2005, he was nominated for a Zee Cine Award for Best Choreographer for the song "Aisa Jadoo Dala Re" from Khakhee (2004). He won the Filmfare award for best choreography in 2007 for the song "Beedi" from Omkara (2006).

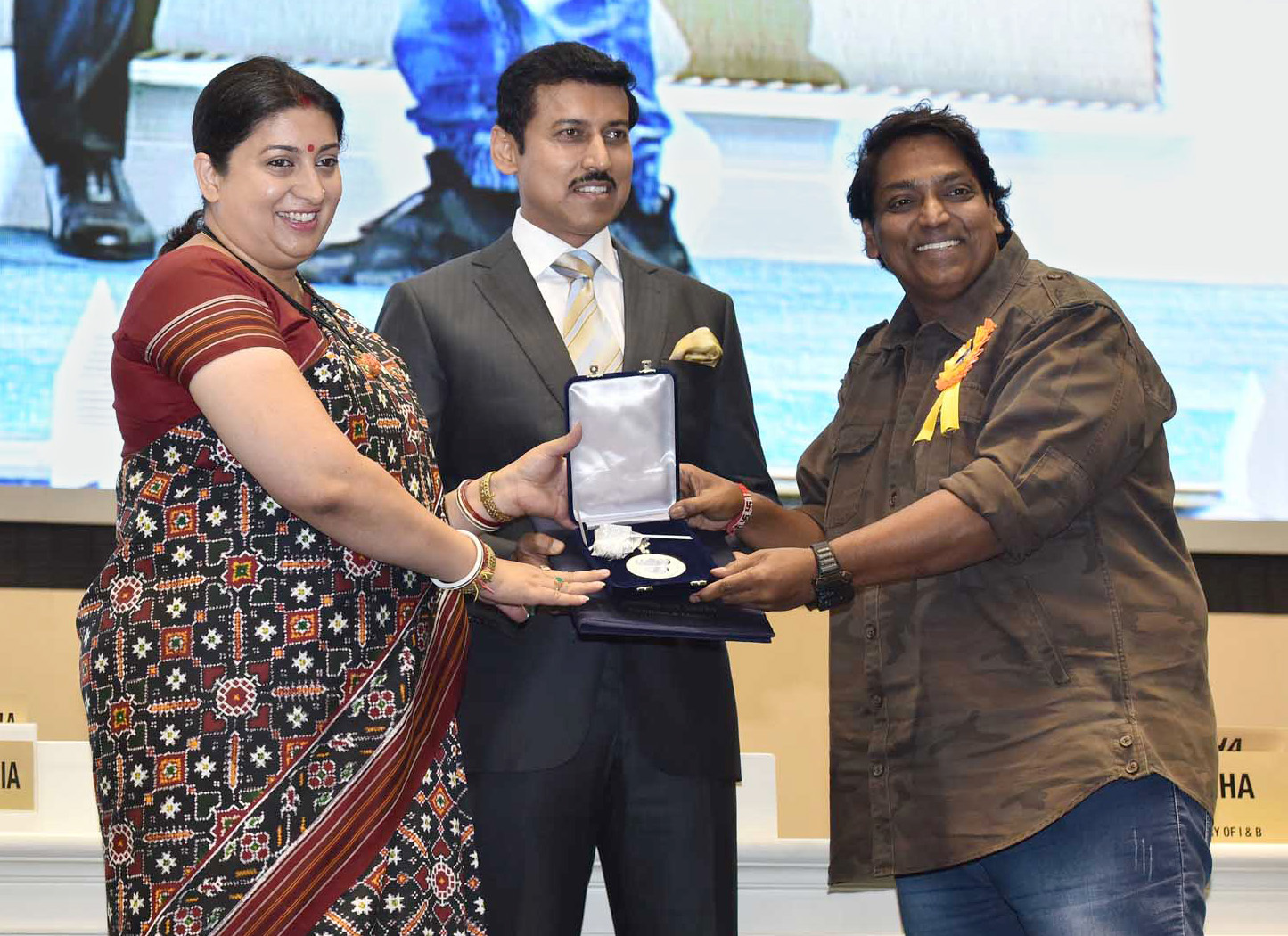
Smriti Irani presenting the Rajat Kamal Award to Ganesh Acharya (Best Choreography) for the Hindi film - Toilet: Ek Prem Katha, at the 65th National Film Awards Function, in New Delhi

Ganesh choreographed for five films in 2006: Rang De Basanti, Phir Hera Pheri, Golmaal, Omkara and Lage Raho Munna Bhai.

He then decided to pursue a career in film direction. Manoj Bajpayee and Juhi Chawla starred in his debut film Swami (2007), which he also produced and wrote. He directed the comedy film Money Hai Toh Honey Hai in 2008. He appeared as a villain in the Tamil film Rowthiram in 2011. He then choreographed "Chikni Chameli" song featuring Katrina Kaif for the 2012 film Agneepath. He appeared in the romantic comedy film Pintu Ki Pappi in 2025.

== Filmography ==
=== Choreographer ===
- Anaam (1992)
- Maidan-E-Jung (1995)
- Taaqat (1995)
- Coolie No. 1 (1995)
- Saajan Chale Sasural (1996)
- Chhote Sarkar (1996)
- Auzaar (1997)
- Ziddi (1997)
- Mr. and Mrs. Khiladi (1997)
- Bhai (1997)
- Ghulam-E-Mustafa (1997)
- Judwaa (1997)
- Badmaash (1998)
- Gharwali Baharwali (1998)
- Achanak (1998)
- Tirchhi Topiwale (1998)
- Bandhan (1998)
- Bade Miyan Chote Miyan (1998)
- Soldier (1998)
- Wajood (1998)
- Lal Baadshah(1999)
- Kaala Samrajya (1999)
- International Khiladi (1999)
- Silsila Hai Pyar Ka (1999)
- Jaanam Samjha Karo (1999)
- Anari No.1 (1999)
- Sirf Tum (1999)
- Haseena Maan Jaayegi (1999)
- Hote Hote Pyaar Ho Gaya (1999)
- Mann (1999)
- Arjun Pandit (1999)
- Baadshah (1999)
- Hello Brother (1999)
- Vaastav: The Reality (1999)
- Thakshak (1999)
- En Sakhiye (2000)
- Bichhoo (2000)
- Dulhan Hum Le Jayenge (2000)
- Baaghi (2000)
- Chal Mere Bhai (2000)
- Joru Ka Ghulam (2000)
- Beti No.1 (2000)
- Tera Jadoo Chal Gayaa (2000)
- Jung (2000)
- Kunwara (2000)
- Refugee (2000)
- Hadh Kar Di Aapne (2000)
- Hamara Dil Aapke Paas Hai (2000)
- Shikari (2000)
- Aaghaaz (2000)
- Jis Desh Mein Ganga Rehta Hain (2000)
- Khiladi 420 (2000)
- Farz (2001)
- Jodi No.1 (2001)
- Bas Itna Sa Khwaab Hai (2001)
- Yeh Raaste Hain Pyaar Ke (2001)
- Lajja (2001)
- Ittefaq (2001)
- Kyo Kii... Main Jhuth Nahin Bolta (2001)
- Ajnabee (2001)
- Rehnaa Hai Terre Dil Mein (2001)
- Indian (2001)
- Deewaanapan (2001)
- Raaz (2002)
- Kranti (2002)
- Aap Mujhe Achche Lagne Lage (2002)
- Pyar Ki Dhun (2002)
- Pyaar Diwana Hota Hai (2002)
- Hum Kisise Kum Nahin (2002)
- The Legend of Bhagat Singh (2002)
- Badhaai Ho Badhaai (2002)
- Akhiyon Se Goli Maare (2002)
- Yeh Hai Jalwa (2002)
- Jaani Dushman (2002)
- Soch (2002)
- Chor Machaaye Shor (2002)
- Shakti: The Power (2002)
- Road (2002)
- Annarth (2002)
- Waah! Tera Kya Kehna (2002)
- Rishtey (2002)
- Chalo Ishq Ladaaye (2002)
- Kucch To Hai (2003)
- Love at Times Square (2003)
- Dhund: The Fog (2003)
- Ek Aur Ek Gyarah (2003)
- The Hero (2003)
- Tere Naam (2003)
- Chupke Se (2003)
- Zameen (2003)
- Sssshhh... (2003)
- Munna Bhai M.B.B.S. (2003)
- Plan (2004)
- Khakee (2004)
- Aetbaar (2004)
- Woh Tera Naam Tha (2004)
- Kismat (2004)
- Masti (2004)
- Run (2004)
- Aan: Men at Work (2004)
- Garv (2004)
- Mujhse Shaadi Karogi (2004)
- Taarzan: The Wonder Car (2004)
- Dil Ne Jise Apna Kahaa (2004)
- Madhoshi (2004)
- Aitraaz (2004)
- Aabra Ka Daabra (2004)
- Ab Tumhare Hawale Watan Saathiyo (2004)
- Vayasu Pasanga (2004)
- Insan (2005)
- Blackmail (2005)
- Main Aisa Hi Hoon (2005)
- Shabnam Mausi (2005)
- Maine Pyaar Kyun Kiya? (2005)
- Shaadi No. 1 (2005)
- Garam Masala (2005)
- Deewane Huye Paagal (2005)
- Dosti: Friends Forever (2005)
- Rang De Basanti (2006)
- Chingaari (2006)
- Humko Tumse Pyaar Hai (2006)
- Saawan... The Love Season (2006)
- Humko Deewana Kar Gaye (2006)
- 36 China Town (2006)
- Phir Hera Pheri (2006)
- Golmaal (2006)
- Omkara (2006)
- Lage Raho Munna Bhai (2006)
- Jaane Hoga Kya (2006)
- Bhagam Bhag (2006)
- Risk (2007)
- Nehlle Pe Dehlla (2007)
- Ek Chalis Ki Last Local (2007)
- Swami (2007)
- Aap Kaa Surroor (2007)
- Chak De! India (2007)
- Dhamaal (2007)
- Halla Bol (2008)
- Sunday (2008)
- Rama Rama Kya Hai Dramaa? (2008)
- Race (2008)
- One Two Three (2008)
- U Me Aur Hum (2008)
- Krazzy 4 (2008)
- Haal-e-Dil (2008)
- Mehbooba (2008)
- God Tussi Great Ho (2008)
- Hari Puttar: A Comedy of Terrors (2008)
- Victory (2009)
- Kisse Pyaar Karoon (2009)
- Ek Se Bure Do (2009)
- Teree Sang (2009)
- Shadow (2009)
- Baabarr (2009)
- Jail (2009)
- De Dana Dan (2009)
- My Friend Ganesha 3 (2010)
- Raavan (2010)
- Khatta Meetha (2010)
- Action Replayy (2010)
- Khuda Kasam (2010)
- Isi Life Mein (2010)
- Bin Bulaye Baraati (2011)
- Double Dhamaal (2011)
- Singham (2011)
- Bodyguard (2011)
- Agneepath (2012)
- Department (2012)
- Jeena Hai Toh Thok Daal (2012)
- Heroine (2012)
- OMG – Oh My God! (2012)
- Chakravyuh (2012)
- Son of Sardaar (2012)
- Khiladi 786 (2012)
- Dabangg 2 (2012)
- Casanovva (2012)
- Main Krishna Hoon (2013)
- Special 26 (2013)
- Zila Ghaziabad (2013)
- Chashme Baddoor (2013)
- ABCD: Any Body Can Dance (2013)
- Commando: A One Man Army (2013)
- Yeh Jawaani Hai Deewani (2013)
- Mr. Money (2013)
- Goliyon Ki Raasleela Ram-Leela (2013)
- Main Tera Hero (2014)
- Kill Dil (2014)
- Heropanti (2014)
- PK (2014)
- Humshakals (2014)
- Mumbai Can Dance Saala (2015)
- Suresh (2015)
- Welcome Back (2015)
- Brothers (2015)
- Calendar Girls (2015)
- Singh Is Bliing (2015)
- Bajirao Mastani (2015)
- Sanam Re (2015)
- Downtown (2016)
- Baaghi (2016)
- Housefull 3 (2016)
- Dongari Ka Raja (2016)
- Baar Baar Dekho (2016)
- Jolly LLB 2 (2017)
- Badrinath Ki Dulhania (2017)
- Toilet: Ek Prem Katha (2017)
- DJ: Duvvada Jagannadham (2017) ("Gudilo Badilo Madilo Vodilo")
- Munna Michael (2017)
- Sarkar 3 (2017)
- Bhoomi (2017)
- Judwaa 2 (2017)
- Bhikari (2017)
- Padmaavat (2018)
- Baaghi 2 (2018)
- Sanju (2018)
- Batti Gul Meter Chalu (2018)
- K.G.F: Chapter 1 (2018) (Hindi Dubbed version, "Gali Gali Remix")
- Zero (2018)
- Simmba (2018)
- Pailwaan (2019)
- Coolie No.1 (2020)
- Pushpa: The Rise (2021) ("Daako Daako Meka", "Oo Antava Oo Oo Antava")
- Brahmāstra (2022)
- Bhediya (2022)
- Adipurush (2023)
- Rocky Aur Rani Kii Prem Kahaani (2023)
- Ghar Banduk Biryani (2023) ("Aaha Hero")
- Ayalaan (2024)
- Devara: Part 1 (2024) ("Ayudha Pooja")
- Vicky Vidya Ka Woh Wala Video (2024)
- Pushpa 2: The Rule (2024) ("Sooseki", "Kissik")
- Game Changer (2025) ("Raa Macha Macha")
- Badass Ravi Kumar (2025)
- Bhooth Bangla (2026) ("Ram Ji Aake Bhala Karenge")

=== Actor ===
- Roti Ki Keemat (1990)
- Jaisi Karni Waisi Bharnii (1989)
- Ghatak (1996)
- Hands Up! (2000)
- En Sakhiye (2000)
- Company (2002)
- Road (2002)
- Koi Hai (2003)
- Vayasu Pasanga (2004)
- Jalwa - Fun in Love (2005)
- Money Hai Toh Honey Hai (2008)
- Vighnaharta Shree Siddhivinayak (2009)
- Raavan (2010)
- Trishna (2011)
- Rowthiram (2012)
- ABCD: Any Body Can Dance (2013)
- Hey Bro (2015)
- Welcome Back (2015)
- Operation Mekong (Chinese-Hong Kong Movie, 2016)
- Mausam Ikrar Ke Do Pal Pyar Ke (2018)
- Zero (2018)
- Govinda Naam Mera (2022) as himself
- Dehati Disco (2022)
- Pintu Ki Pappi (2025)

=== Director ===
1. Swami (2007)
2. Money Hai Toh Honey Hai (2008)
3. Angel (2011)(Film Producer also)
4. Bhikari (2017)
