= Spark (2014 film) =

- Poster
- Written by: V. K. Singh
- Produced by: Rekha Yadav; Naresh Gupta
- Starring: Rajneesh Duggal; Subhashree Ganguly; Govind Namdeo; Ashutosh Rana; Rati Agnihotri
- Edited by: Nilesh Mulye
- Music by: Lalit Pandit, Monty Sharma and Nitz 'N' Sony
- Release date: 10 October 2014
- Country: India
- Language: Hindi

Spark is an Indian drama film written and directed by V. K. Singh, produced by Rekha Yadav and Naresh Gupta. The film stars Rajneesh Duggal and Subhashree Ganguly in lead roles, with Govind Namdeo, Ashutosh Rana, Rohit Raj and Rati Agnihotri in supporting roles. The movie is edited by Nilesh Mulye. The film was released on 10 October 2014.

== Plot ==
The movie opens with a brutal night raid, where a gang of thugs slaughters an entire family, sparing only a baby. That child grows up to be Arjun (Rajniesh Duggal), a charming young man making ends meet with odd jobs in Germany. His journey there unfolds through an extended flashback, revealing that his foster father, Papaji (Ranjeet), emotionally coerced him into leaving India.

In Germany, Arjun reconnects with Anupama (Subhashree Ganguly), his college sweetheart from Uttar Pradesh, and romance blossoms. After a few dreamy song sequences featuring foreign dancers, Arjun returns to India to care for Papaji, who soon falls victim to an attack by local goons. These villains turn out to be ambitious politicians with deep ties to Arjun’s past.

The question remains: can Arjun, now hardened by his time abroad, piece together the puzzle of his haunted history and confront those who destroyed his family?

== Cast ==
- Rajniesh Duggal as Arjun
- Subhashree Ganguly as Anupama
- Ashutosh Rana as Rana and Veera (double role)
- Govind Namdeo
- Rohit Raj as Tikkam
- Rati Agnihotri
- Mansha Bahl as Nimita
- Manoj Joshi
- Ranjeet
- Daisy Shah in the item number "Meri Jawani Sode Ki Botal"

== Soundtrack ==
Spark

Soundtrack album by Lalit Pandit, Monty Sharma & Nitz 'N' Sony
- Genre: Feature film soundtrack
- Length: 22:05

The soundtrack was composed by Lalit Pandit, Monty Sharma and Nitz 'N' Sony, while the lyrics were written by Sameer, Chi Chi and Naresh Gupta.

No.	Title	Singer(s)	Length
1.	"Ishq Da Virus Lagaya"	Mika Singh	4:00
2.	"Meri Jawani Sode Ki Botal"	Mamta Sharma	4:05
3.	"Pallu Sambhal Gori"	Bappi Lahiri, Bob, Usha Uthup	4:58
4.	"Kuchh Lab Pe Hai"	Sonu Nigam, Shreya Ghoshal	4:45
5.	"Khawabon Mein Dekhi"	Mohammad Irfan, Yashita Sharma	4:15
Total length:			22:05

== Reception ==
A review in India Today was very critical of the production as was one in the Times of India. Paloma Sharma of Rediff gave the movie 1/2 out of 4 stars and wrote "The editing is horrendous. Scenes have been randomly placed here and there. The editor and director probably set out to make a three-part series but have now fit everything. The film is like a shabby pile of scenes that sometimes make sense but generally don't. Spark's title, like everything else about it, is random".
