= Mani Bhavan =

Museum in Mumbai

Mani Bhavan Gandhi Sangrahalaya
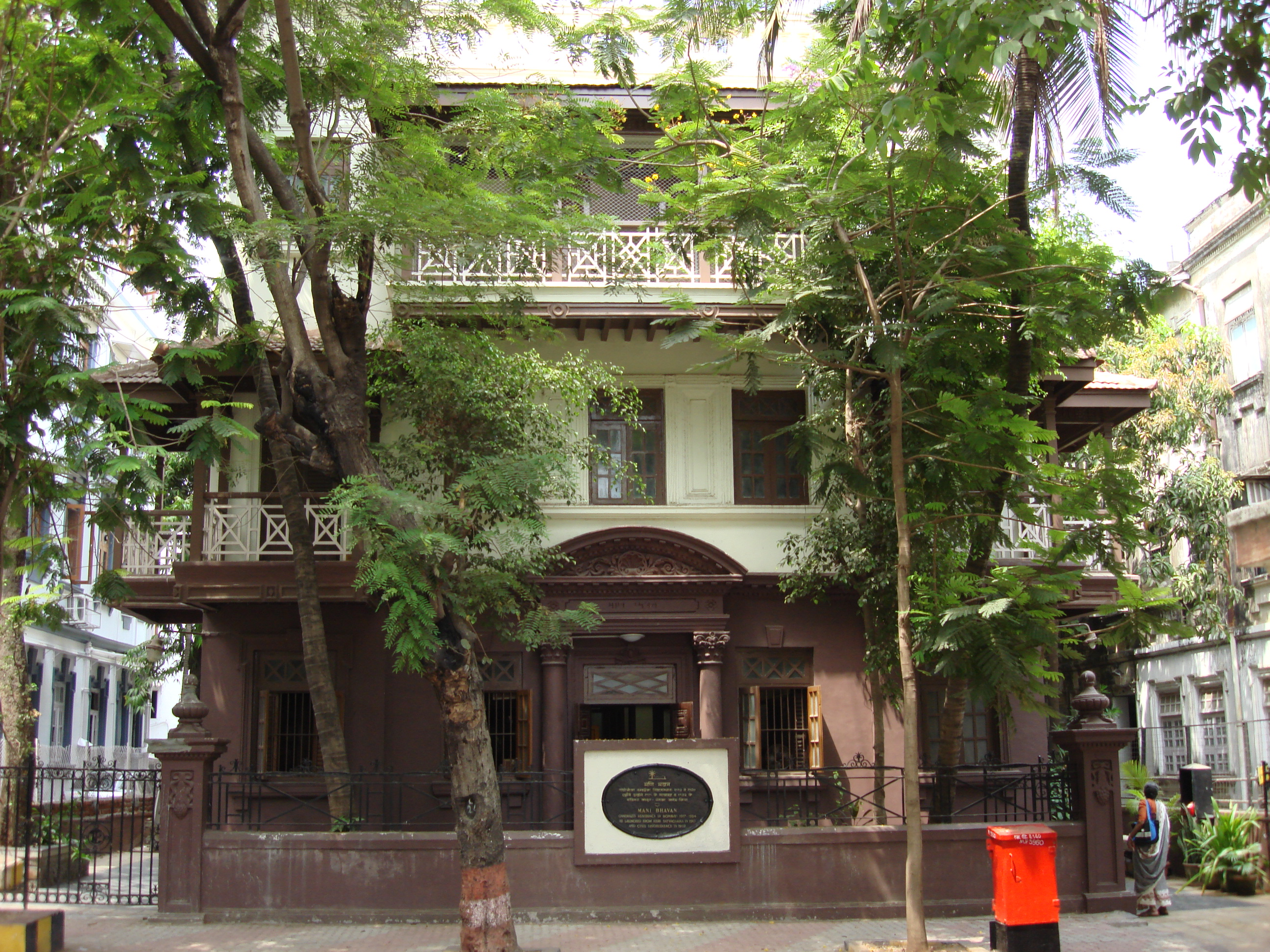
- The two-storey structure, Mani Bhavan in 2007
- Established: 1955; 71 years ago as a memorial
- Location: Mumbai, India
- Coordinates: 18°57′35.56″N 72°48′41.4″E
- Type: Biographical museum Historic house museum
- Collection size: 50,000 books and periodicals
- Website: www.gandhi-manibhavan.org

Mani Bhavan (lit. 'Jewel House') is a museum and historical building dedicated to Gandhi, situated at Laburnum Road in the Gamdevi precinct of Mumbai. Mani Bhavan was the focal point of Gandhi's political activities in Mumbai between 1917 and 1934.

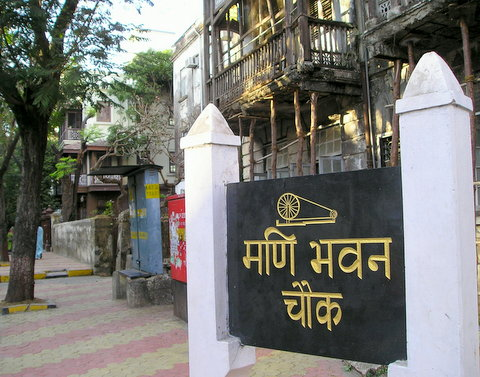
'Road to Mani bhavan'

== Gandhi's Headquarters ==
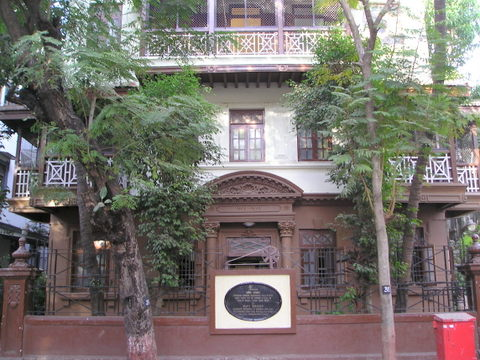
Front gate of Mani Bhavan.

Mani Bhavan was Gandhi's Mumbai headquarters for about 17 years, from 1917 to 1934. The mansion belonged to Revashankar Jagjeevan Jhaveri, Gandhi's friend and host in Mumbai during this period. It was from Mani Bhavan that Gandhi initiated the Non-Cooperation, Satyagraha, Swadeshi, Khadi and Khilafat Movements. Gandhi's association with the charkha began in 1917, while he was staying at Mani Bhavan. Mani Bhavan is also closely associated with Gandhi's involvement in the Home Rule Movement, as well as his decision to abstain from drinking cow's milk in order to protest the cruel and inhuman practice of phookan meted out to milch cattle common during that period.

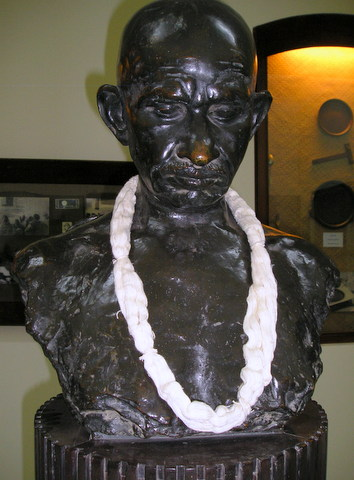
The bust of Mahatma Gandhi.

In 1955, the building was taken over by the Gandhi Smarak Nidhi in order to maintain it as a memorial to Gandhi.

== Gandhi's Museum and library ==
There is a library with a statue of the Mahatma where people offer tributes. A staircase dotted with Gandhi's pictures depicting his life leads visitors to the first floor which has a photo gallery with photographs from his childhood till his assassination, along with press clippings.

The room that Gandhi used during his stay is on the second floor, where through a glass partition people can see two of his spinning wheels, a book and his bed on the floor. Right opposite that room is a hall where photographs and paintings of his lifetime are on display. The terrace he was arrested on, on 4 January 1932, also remains.

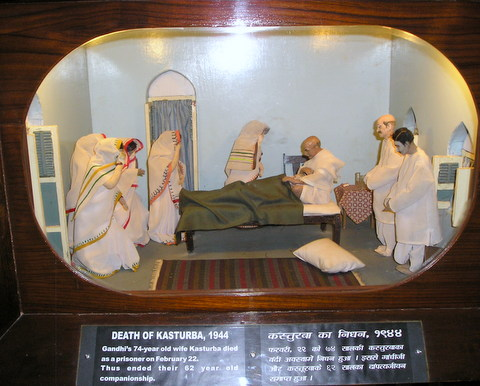
Model of Kasturba on her deathbed resting on the lap of Gandhi.

== Obama's Visit ==
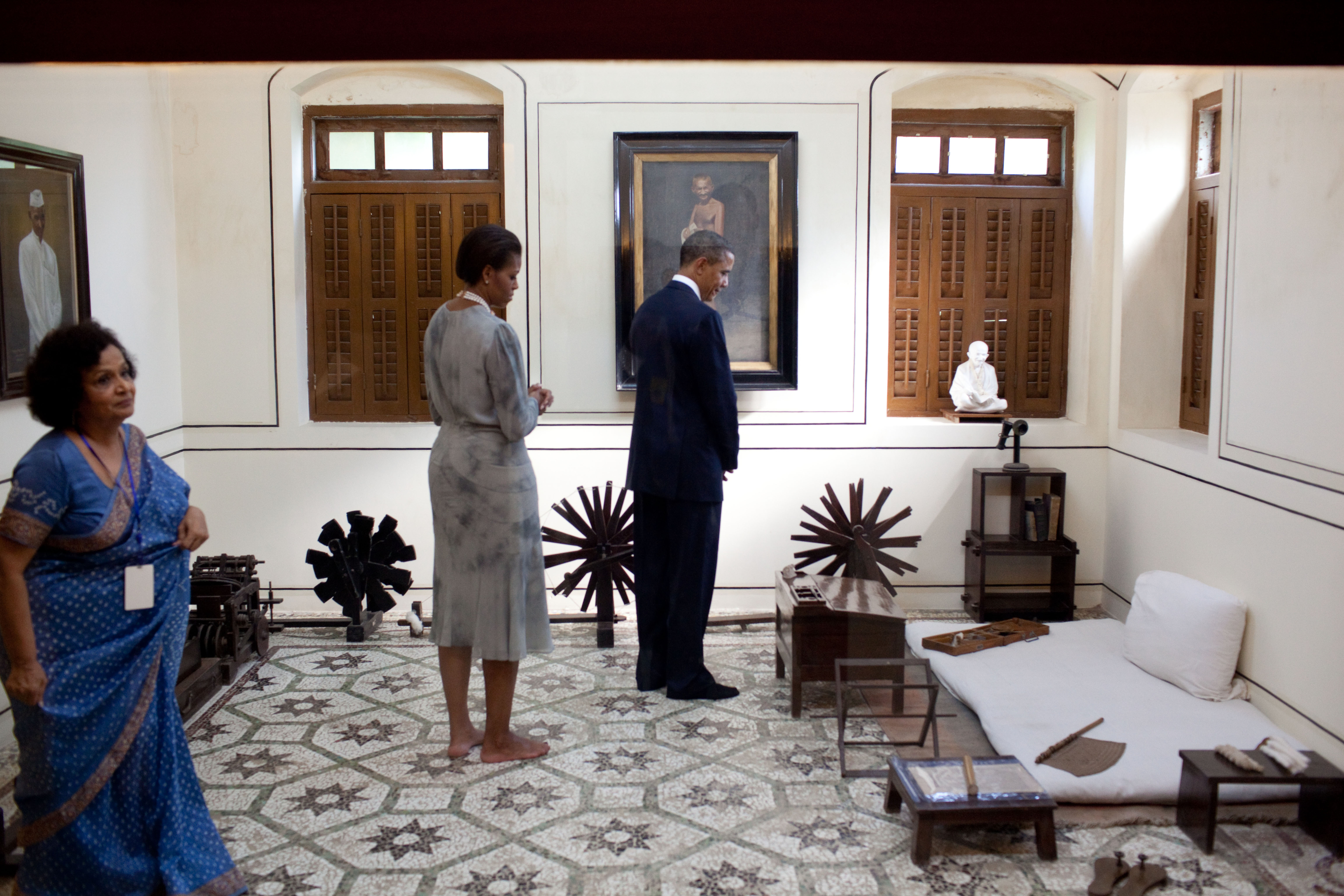
President Barack Obama and First Lady Michelle Obama tour Gandhi's room at the Mani Bhavan.

In his November 2010 visit, Barack Obama became the first high-profile international visitor to visit the Mani Bhavan Gandhi Sangrahalaya in the last 50 years. Before him, only Martin Luther King Jr. had visited Mani Bhavan in the 1950s.

== See also ==
- Non-Cooperation Movement
- Khadi
- Satyagraha
- Swadeshi
- Charkha (spinning wheel)
- Khilafat Movement
