= Maninder Singh (actor) =

Indian television actor (born 1980)

- Born: 27 September 1980 (age 45); Agra, Uttar Pradesh, India
- Occupation: Actor
- Years active: 2007–2021
- Known for: Khelein Hum Jee Jaan Sey (2010)
- Height: 178 cm (5 ft 10 in)
- Relatives: Taru Wasu (sister)

Maninder Singh is an Indian actor. He played Indian independence activist Ananta Singh in the film Khelein Hum Jee Jaan Sey (2010). He played the lead role in the suspense thriller television show 2612 (2012) as Randeep Rathore and reprised the same role in the next season titled as 2613. In 2014, he was also seen in the popular television show CID portraying Senior Inspector Dushyant Hemraj. He was also seen in Zee TV's Sanyukt. He was last seen in Star Bharat's Kya Haal, Mr. Paanchal?.

== Filmography ==
=== Films ===
Year	Film	Role
2007	Swami	Anand
2010	Khelein Hum Jee Jaan Sey	Ananta Singh
2012	Seal Team Six: The Raid on Osama Bin Laden	Malik
2015	Hey Bro	Shiv
2021	Jinne Jamme Saare Nikamme	Jaggi

=== Television ===
Year	Serial	Role
2009	Ek Safar Aisa Kabhi Socha Na Tha	Manav Rathore
2012	Humne Li Hai... Shapath	Randeep Rathore
2012	2612	Randeep Rathore
2013	2613	Randeep Rathore
2014	CID	Senior Inspector Dushyant Hemraj
2016–2017	Sanyukt	Rahul Mehta
2017–2019	Kya Haal, Mr. Paanchal?	Kanhaiya Paanchal

== Awards ==
Year	Award	Category	Show
2018	Zee Gold Awards	Best Actor in a Comic Role (Male)	Kya Haal, Mr. Paanchal?
