= Rising Star (Indian TV series) =

Indian reality television show

- Genre: Reality; Talent show
- Created by: Keshet Media Group
- Based on: Live singing
- Developed by: Screenz Cross Media LTD
- Presented by: Raghav Juyal (season 1); Meiyang Chang (season 1); Ravi Dubey (season 2); Aditya Narayan (season 3)
- Judges: Shankar Mahadevan (season 1—3); Monali Thakur (season 1—2); Diljit Dosanjh (season 1—3); Neeti Mohan (season 3)
- Theme music composer: Sylas McGriff
- Country of origin: India
- Original language: Hindi
- No. of seasons: 3
- No. of episodes: 73

Production
- Producer: Vipul D. Shah
- Production locations: Film City, Mumbai, India
- Camera setup: Multi-camera
- Production companies: Keshet Broadcasting; Optimystix Entertainment

Original release
- Network: Colors TV
- Release: 4 February 2017 – 8 June 2019

Rising Star is an Indian Hindi-language version of the international franchise series Rising Star, a reality television singing competition. The show premiered on 4 February 2017 on Colors TV. Its third and final season ended on 8 June 2019.

This is the first reality television show in India which involves live audience voting. Votes can be sent through Colors TV app (season 1) and Voot app.(season 2–3)

Playback singer and music director Shankar Mahadevan, actor-singer Diljit Dosanjh and playback singer Monali Thakur formed the trio of experts. Monali was later replaced by Neeti Mohan in the third season of the show. This show marked Dosanjh's television debut.

== Hosts ==
The first season of the show was hosted by singer-actor Meiyang Chang and dancer-choreographer Raghav Juyal. Television actor Ravi Dubey took over as host for the second season and was replaced by actor-singer Aditya Narayan in the third season.

== Format ==
In contrast to other singing competition TV shows which feature a cast of celebrity judges, Rising Star features a cast of celebrity experts and considers the viewers at home the judges. During each performance, the audience at home is able to decide in real time whether or not a contestant is sent through to the next round by using a mobile voting app.

While the viewers are considered the "judges", the expert panelists also may influence the vote, but with continuously decreasing percentage votes over the total public vote and not exceeding 5% of the total voting power.

=== Auditions ===
The auditions are the first round where the acts are individually called to perform. As a reportage of the announced performer is shown, viewers are invited to register for voting for that specific act. Following a countdown of three seconds, the candidate has to start performing behind a screen called "the wall".

With the start of the performance, the voting kicks in. Registered voters have the option of voting just "yes" or "no". Non-votes are also considered "no" votes. If an expert votes "yes", another 5% is added to the tally of the contestant. The contestants also see random photos of voters in their favour. The faces of panelists voting "yes" are also shown in larger frames.

Once the contestant reaches 80% of "yes" votes, the wall is raised and the contestant goes to the next round of the competition.

=== Duels ===
Contestants who make it through the auditions are paired by the judges to face off in a duel. The first contestant sings with the wall up and sets the benchmark for the second contestant. The second contestant sings with the wall down. If the second contestant betters the first contestant's vote total, the wall rises and the second contestant was through to the next round while the first contestant is eliminated; if the second contestant fails to raise the wall, the second contestant is eliminated and the first contestant goes through.

== Series overview ==
| Season | Episodes | Original Broadcast | |
| Season | Episodes | First Aired | Last Aired |
|---|---|---|---|
| 1 | 23 | 4 February 2017 | 23 April 2017 |
| 2 | 25 | 20 January 2018 | 15 April 2018 |
| 3 | 24 | 16 March 2019 | 8 June 2019 |

Color key

Shankar Mahadevan
Monali Thakur
Neeti Mohan
Diljit Dosanjh

| Season | Premiere | Final | Winner | 1st Runner-up | 2nd | Host(s) | Experts (Chair's Order ) | | |
| Season | Premiere | Final | Winner | 1st Runner-up | Runner-up | Host(s) | 1 | 2 | 3 |
|---|---|---|---|---|---|---|---|---|---|
| 1 | 4 February 2017 | 23 April 2017 | Bannet Dosanjh | Maithili Thakur | Ankita Kundu | Raghav Juyal; Meiyang Chang | Shankar Mahadevan | Monali Thakur | Diljit Dosanjh |
| 2 | 20 January 2018 | 15 April 2018 | Hemant Brijwasi | Rohanpreet Singh | Vishnumaya Ramesh | Ravi Dubey | Shankar Mahadevan | Monali Thakur | Diljit Dosanjh |
| 3 | 16 March 2019 | 8 June 2019 | Aftab Singh | Diwakar Sharma | Sanjay Satish | Aditya Narayan | Shankar Mahadevan | Neeti Mohan | Diljit Dosanjh |

- Bannet Dosanjh became India's first Rising Star, winning Rs. 20 lakhs and the opportunity to sing in a movie under Vishesh Films banner. Maithili Thakur and Ankita Kundu were declared the first and second runners up respectively.
- Hemant Brijvasi was adjudged as the winner of the second season. Rohanpreet Singh and Vishnumaya Ramesh were the first and second runners up respectively.
- Aftab Singh was adjudged as the winner of the third season. Diwakar Sharma and Sanjay Satish were the first and second runners up respectively.

== Production ==
On 16 October 2016, Variety reported that Viacom18 had signed a licensing deal with Keshet International for the format rights to Rising Star. The show began airing on Colors TV from 4 February 2017.
