= Anjali Gaikwad =

- Occupation: Singer
- Years active: 2017–present
- Musical career
- Genres: Hindustani Classical; Film
- Instrument: Vocals

Anjali Gaikwad is an Indian classical singer from Ahmednagar, Maharashtra. She sings songs in the Marathi and Hindi languages. In 2017, she appeared in the singing reality show Sa Re Ga Ma Pa Li'l Champs 2017, where she was the winner along with Shreyan Bhattacharya.

In 2020 Anjali Gaikwad participated in Indian Idol 12, where she was in the Top 9 contestants.

== Early life ==
She had started learning music at the age of 4 from her father. She debuted her signing career from a Marathi Music Reality show Sangeet Samrat in 2017 organised by Zee Yuva.

== Career ==
She was the winner of Sangeet Samrat in 2017. In 2017 she took part in Sa Re Ga Ma Pa Li'l Champs 2017 where she was mentored and judged by Neha Kakkar, Himesh Reshammiya, and Javed Ali, She was the winner of the show along with Shreyan Bhattacharya.

Later in 2021, She was in Indian Idol 12, finishing in 9th place. In that show, she along with other contestants was criticized by Amit Kumar for her singing. She debuted with A.R. Rehman's song Mard Maratha in 2017. she has connoisseur of music and a talented singer Lokmat Sur Jyotsna National Music Award 2018

Recently she has been accused of scamming people, but later she posted that her Instagram account was hacked.
