= Rising Star (Indian TV series) season 1 =

Indian Television show

Rising Star
- Season 1
- No. of episodes: 24

Release
- Original network: Colors TV
- Original release: 4 February – 23 April 2017

Season chronology
- Next → Season 2

Rising Star is an Indian version of the international franchise series Rising Star, a reality television singing competition.

The program format lets the viewers vote for contestants live via the television channel's mobile app. The show premiered on 4 February 2015 on Colors TV.

Playback singer and music director Shankar Mahadevan, playback singer and actor Monali Thakur and actor-singer Diljit Dosanjh are the experts in the show. This show marks as Diljit Dosanjh's television debut. The show is hosted by singer-actor Meiyang Chang and dancer-choreographer Raghav Juyal.

Bannet Dosanjh became India's first Rising Star, won Rs. 20 lakhs and also an opportunity to sing a song in an upcoming Vishesh Films movie. Maithili Thakur was declared the first runner-up.

== Season overview ==
=== Live auditions ===
The live auditions began on 4 February 2017 and lasted for 8 episodes.

Episode Date	Contestant	Song	Votes	Expert's choices			Result
Episode Date	Contestant	Song	Votes	Shankar Mahadevan	Monali Thakur	Diljit Dosanjh	Result
4 Feb	Afsana Khan	Jugni	92%				Advanced
4 Feb	Nisha Sarwaan	Maahi Ve	91%				Advanced
4 Feb	Sankalp Ketwal	I Love You	89%				Advanced
4 Feb	Ishrat Siddiqui	Aaj Hona Deedar	91%				Advanced
4 Feb	Diljot Qawwali Group	Haanikaarak Bapu	94%				Advanced
4 Feb	Kartiki Gaikwad	Waajle Ki Baara	78%				Advanced
4 Feb	Sukhdeep Gharu	Mitwa	93%				Advanced
4 Feb	Shraddha & Ramesh Das	Chaap Tilak	93%				Advanced
5 Feb	Ankita Sachdev	Jiya Jale	96%				Advanced
5 Feb	Vibha Saraf	Zara Zara	83%				Advanced
5 Feb	Ameya Date	Chunar	94%				Advanced
5 Feb	Sheuli Samadar	Jhalla Wallah	93%				Advanced
5 Feb	Ankita Kundu	Lag Jaa Gale	93%				Advanced
5 Feb	M. L. Gayatri & M. L. Shruti	Jiya Re	90%				Advanced
5 Feb	Virendra Bharti	Jab Lagaawelu Tu Lipistick	60%				Eliminated
5 Feb	Anita Bhatt	Laila Main Laila	83%				Advanced
11 Feb	Ayesha & Abhipsha	Breathless	93%				Advanced
11 Feb	Das Vegas	Mayya Mayya	82%				Advanced
11 Feb	Divyam Sodhi	O Re Piya	66%				Eliminated
11 Feb	Maithili Thakur	Bhor Bhaye	94%				Advanced
11 Feb	Kumar Sanjoy	Main Solah Baras Ki	66%				Eliminated
11 Feb	Meghdhanush Band	Mor Bani / Kausambi	88%				Advanced
11 Feb	Pooja Sarkar	Parda	76%				Advanced
11 Feb	Tejpal & Kangkana	Besharmi Ki Height	50%				Eliminated
12 Feb	Anmol Sharma	Slow Motion Angreza	94%				Advanced
12 Feb	Loveleen Kaur	Katiya Karoon	94%				Advanced
12 Feb	Nikita Boro	Sawaar Loon	95%				Advanced
12 Feb	Bhagyashri & Dhanashri	Aplam Chaplam	67%				Eliminated
12 Feb	Nitin Nayak	Kadi Aa Mil Sanwal Yaar	93%				Advanced
12 Feb	Peehu Srivastava	Deewani Mastani	91%				Advanced
12 Feb	Chelsi Behura	Har Kisi Ko	93%				Advanced
18 Feb	Niazi Nizami Brothers	Bhar Do Jholi Meri	89%				Advanced
18 Feb	Shreyasi Bhattacharjee	Hai Rama	94%				Advanced
18 Feb	Bannet Dosanjh	Challa	93%				Advanced
18 Feb	Swaragini Group	Mei Baalam Wahi / Mera Babu Chail Chabeela	55%				Eliminated
18 Feb	Piyush Panwar	Abhi Mujh Mein Kahin	94%				Advanced
18 Feb	Prathaa Khandekar	Khatooba	61%				Eliminated
18 Feb	Shahzan Mujeeb	Bulleya	60%				Eliminated
18 Feb	Ankona & Niharika	Pinga	78%				Advanced
19 Feb	Vikram Jeet Singh	Dil Haara	96%				Advanced
19 Feb	Raagdeep	Dum Maaro Dum / Yaar Na Miley	92%				Advanced
19 Feb	Ankita Deka	Main Mast	52%				Eliminated
19 Feb	G. Ritesh	Janam Janam	85%				Advanced
19 Feb	Ashwani Koul	Maula Mere Le Le Meri Jaan	68%				Eliminated
19 Feb	Dipsikha Bhuyan	Tujhko Jo Paaya	87%				Advanced
19 Feb	Humsufi	Piya Re Piya Re	95%				Advanced
25 Feb	Roohani Sisters	Dum Ali Ali / Mast Kalandar	56%				Eliminated
25 Feb	Deblina Nath	Ye Mera Dil Yaar Ka Deewana	92%				Advanced
25 Feb	Trilogy	Ilahi / Raag Hamsadhwani	58%				Eliminated
25 Feb	Ananya Mishra	Aao Na Gale Lagao Na	61%				Eliminated
25 Feb	Kausik Kar	Auva Auva - Koi Yahaan Nache Nache	51%				Eliminated
25 Feb	Prince Singh**	Ikk Kudi	76%				Eliminated
25 Feb	Traditional Boys**	Ghoomar / Jag Ghoomeya	77%				Eliminated
25 Feb	Jidnesh Vaze**	Albela Sajan	81%				Second Chance
26 Feb	Rakshita Suresh	Dil Mera Muft Ka	94%				Advanced
26 Feb	Kushal Chokshi	Kurbaan Hua	54%				Eliminated
26 Feb	Snehlata Mishra	Hamari Atariya Pe	51%				Eliminated
26 Feb	Dharmendra Nayat	Ae Dil Hai Mushkil (song)	92%				Advanced
26 Feb	Sayani Palit	Raag Des	93%				Advanced
26 Feb	Deepesh Bhati**	Mohe Panghat Pe	87%				Second Chance
26 Feb	Vikram Labadiya & Group	Shubhaarambh	92%				Advanced

- **An exception was made in the final two audition episodes wherein the wall was raised only if the contestant managed to get at least 90% votes. This modification was made since most of the top contestants who had already qualified for the next round had scored more than 90%. Judges made an exception for two contestants Jidnesh Vaze & Deepesh Bhati and gave them a second chance to participate in the Duels Ki Takkar round.

=== Duels Ki Takkar ===
The top 30 scorers from the auditions moved on to the second round named 'Duels Ki Takkar' which began on 4 March 2017. The contestants who qualify from this round move on to the quarterfinals.

Episode 9: 4 March 2017

Order	Contestant	Song	Votes	Experts' choices			Result
Order	Contestant	Song	Votes	Shankar Mahadevan	Monali Thakur	Diljit Dosanjh	Result
1	Piyush Panwar	Tadap Tadap Ke	52%				Eliminated
1	Ameya Date	Tum Hi Ho	92%				Advanced
2	Dharmendra Nayat	Khamoshiyan	84%				Eliminated
2	Vikram Jeet Singh	Naina Thag Lenge	95%				Advanced
3	Vikram Labadiya & Group	Hey Naam Re / Lili Lembdi	71%				Eliminated
3	Diljot Qawwali Group	Tumse Milke / Saawan Mein	90%				Advanced
4	Chelsi Behura	Pari Hoon Main	87%				Advanced
4	Loveleen Kaur	Bhare Naina	75%				Eliminated

Episode 10: 5 March 2017

Order	Contestant	Song	Votes	Experts' choices			Result
Order	Contestant	Song	Votes	Shankar Mahadevan	Monali Thakur	Diljit Dosanjh	Result
1	Nikita Boro	Yeh Ishq Hai	92%				Advanced
1	Anmol Sharma	Ruth Aa Gayi Re	90%				Eliminated
2	Afsana Khan	Ni Main Samajh Gayi	90%				Advanced
2	Nisha Sarwaan	Zindagi Mein Koi Kabhi	81%				Eliminated
3	Raagdeep	Rang Barse / Balam Pichkari	77%				Advanced
3	Shraddha & Ramesh Das	Maar Diya Jaaye	61%				Eliminated
4	Jidnesh Vaze	Laaga Chunari Mein Daag	84%				Advanced
4	Deepesh Bhati	Moh Moh Ke Dhaage	63%				Eliminated

Episode 11: 11 March 2017

Order	Contestant	Song	Votes	Experts' choices			Result
Order	Contestant	Song	Votes	Shankar Mahadevan	Monali Thakur	Diljit Dosanjh	Result
1	Deblina Nath	O Mere Sona Re	90%				Eliminated
1	Ankita Kundu	Mohe Rang Do Laal	92%				Advanced
2	Maithili Thakur	Kesariya Balam	93%				Advanced
2	Sayani Palit	Aaoge Jab Tum	84%				Eliminated
3	Shreyasi Bhattacharjee	Mere Dholna	86%				Advanced
3	Ayesha & Abhipsha	Morey Piya / Raag Madhuvanti	72%				Eliminated
4	Sukhdeep Gharu	Tu Mane Ya Na Mane	92.86%				Eliminated
4	Bannet Dosanjh	Ramta Jogi	92.91%				Advanced

Episode 12: 12 March 2017

Order	Contestant	Song	Votes	Experts' choices			Result
Order	Contestant	Song	Votes	Shankar Mahadevan	Monali Thakur	Diljit Dosanjh	Result
1	Ankita Sachdev	Kehna Hi Kya	94%				Advanced
1	Sheuli Samadar	Namak Isaq Ka	56%				Eliminated
2	Humsufi	Allah Hoo / Rangilo Maro Dholna	87%				Advanced
2	M. L. Gayatri & M. L. Shruti	Kamli / Raag Sindhu Bhairavi	81%				Eliminated
3	Nitin Nayak	Tere Bin Nahin Jeena Mar Jaana	86%				Advanced
3	Ishrat Siddiqui	Ram Chahe Leela	77%				Eliminated
4	Peehu Srivastava	Gun Gun Guna Re	61%				Eliminated
4	Rakshita Suresh	Chhaliya	93%				Advanced

=== India's Favourite 16 ===
The top 16 contestants compete in this round. As the round progresses, the contestant who receives fewer votes at that point of the competition moves to the Red Sofa. At the end of the episode, the contestant who sits on the Red Sofa gets eliminated.

Episode 13: 18 March 2017

Order	Contestant	Song	Votes	Experts' choices			Result
Order	Contestant	Song	Votes	Shankar Mahadevan	Monali Thakur	Diljit Dosanjh	Result
1	Ameya Date	Kill Dil	89%				Advanced
2	Nikita Boro	Barso Re	84%				Advanced
3	Ankita Sachdev	Jaadu Hai Nasha Hai	82%				Advanced
4	Maithili Thakur	Albela Sajan	92%				Advanced
5	Rakshita Suresh	Aa Zara	67%				Eliminated
6	Humsufi	Kinna Sohna Tenu Rab Ne Banaya	87%				Advanced
7	Chelsi Behura	Cham Cham	88%				Advanced
8	Nitin Nayak	Yeh Honsla	79%				Advanced

Episode 14: 19 March 2017

Order	Contestant	Song	Votes	Experts' choices			Result
Order	Contestant	Song	Votes	Shankar Mahadevan	Monali Thakur	Diljit Dosanjh	Result
1	Afsana Khan	Ghani Bawri	92%				Advanced
2	Vikram Jeet Singh	Saiyyan	93%				Advanced
3	Ankita Kundu	Maar Daala	90%				Advanced
4	Diljot Qawwali Group	Baawre / Aaya Tere Dar Pe	88.75%				Advanced
5	Jidnesh Vaze	Jhingat	88.24%				Advanced
6	Shreyasi Bhattacharjee	Kay Sera Sera	81%				Advanced
7	Raagdeep	Khwab Dekhe / Laung Gawacha	76%				Eliminated
8	Bannet Dosanjh	Dard-e-Disco	94%				Advanced

=== Duets challenge ===
The top 14 contestants compete in this round. On day one, four teams of two perform in duets. The first two teams perform with the wall up and set the target percentage. The next two teams perform with the wall down and attempt to beat the target score. The duos with the two least scores move to the Red Sofa (unsafe zone). These two teams compete in a face off. The team which loses in the face off gets eliminated.

Episode 15: 25 March 2017

Order	Contestant	Song	Votes	Experts' choices			Result
Order	Contestant	Song	Votes	Shankar Mahadevan	Monali Thakur	Diljit Dosanjh	Result
1	Bannet Dosanjh	Ainvayi Ainvayi	89%				Advanced
1	Afsana Khan	Ainvayi Ainvayi	89%				Advanced
2	Ameya Date	Badal Ghumad	94%				Advanced
2	Maithili Thakur	Badal Ghumad	94%				Advanced
3	Humsufi	Mera Piya Ghar Aaya	75%				Proceeded to Face Off Round
3	Shreyasi Bhattacharjee	Mera Piya Ghar Aaya	75%				Proceeded to Face Off Round
4	Nikita Boro	Gerua	86%				Proceeded to Face Off Round
4	Jidnesh Vaze	Gerua	86%				Proceeded to Face Off Round

Duets Face Off round

The bottom two teams perform in the face off round. The team to perform first will set a target percentage. The second team has a challenge to perform better, raise the wall and save themselves.

Order	Contestant	Song	Votes	Experts' choices			Result
Order	Contestant	Song	Votes	Shankar Mahadevan	Monali Thakur	Diljit Dosanjh	Result
1	Humsufi	Chaiyya Chaiyya	82%				Eliminated
1	Shreyasi Bhattacharjee	Chaiyya Chaiyya	82%				Eliminated
2	Nikita Boro	Manwa Laage	89%				Advanced
2	Jidnesh Vaze	Manwa Laage	89%				Advanced

Episode 16: 26 March 2017

Order	Contestant	Song	Votes	Experts' choices			Result
Order	Contestant	Song	Votes	Shankar Mahadevan	Monali Thakur	Diljit Dosanjh	Result
1	Ankita Sachdev	O Haseena Zulfowaali	96%				Advanced
1	Vikram Jeet Singh	O Haseena Zulfowaali	96%				Advanced
2	Diljot Qawwali Group	Kajra Re / Jhoom Barabar Jhoom	93%				Proceeded to Face Off Round
2	Ankita Kundu	Kajra Re / Jhoom Barabar Jhoom	93%				Proceeded to Face Off Round
3	Nitin Nayak	Bol Na Halke Halke	92%				Proceeded to Face Off Round
3	Chelsi Behura	Bol Na Halke Halke	92%				Proceeded to Face Off Round

Duets Face Off round

The bottom two teams perform in the face off round. The team to perform first will set a target percentage. The second team has a challenge to perform better, raise the wall and save themselves.

Order	Contestant	Song	Votes	Experts' choices			Result
Order	Contestant	Song	Votes	Shankar Mahadevan	Monali Thakur	Diljit Dosanjh	Result
1	Diljot Qawwali Group	Paan Khaye Saiyan / Tharki Chokro	81%				Advanced
1	Ankita Kundu	Paan Khaye Saiyan / Tharki Chokro	81%				Advanced
2	Nitin Nayak	Soch Na Sake	67%				Eliminated
2	Chelsi Behura	Soch Na Sake	67%				Eliminated

=== Remix with DJ Chetas ===
The top 10 contestants compete in this round where they sing live to the tunes played by DJ Chetas.

Episode 17: 1 April 2017

Order	Contestant	Song	Votes	Experts' choices			Result
Order	Contestant	Song	Votes	Shankar Mahadevan	Monali Thakur	Diljit Dosanjh	Result
1	Diljot Qawwali Group	Afghan Jalebi / Dhadang Dhang	87%				Advanced
2	Afsana Khan	Banno	85%				Advanced
3	Ameya Date	Kabhi Jo Baadal Barse	87%				Advanced
4	Ankita Kundu	Hothon Mein Aisi Baat	86%				Advanced
5	Bannet Dosanjh	Jee Karda	83%				Advanced
6	Maithili Thakur	Sajdaa	91%				Advanced
7	Vikram Jeet Singh	Kaava Kaava	92%				Advanced
8	Nikita Boro	Mera Naam Chin Chin Chu	84%				Advanced
9	Jidnesh Vaze	Channa Mereya	77%				Eliminated
10	Ankita Sachdev	Taal Se Taal	80%				Advanced

=== Dil Se ===
The top 9 contestants sing a dedication to their loved ones.

Episode 18: 2 April 2017

Order	Contestant	Song	Votes	Experts' choices			Result
Order	Contestant	Song	Votes	Shankar Mahadevan	Monali Thakur	Diljit Dosanjh	Result
1	Ameya Date	Maa	93%				Advanced
2	Vikram Jeet Singh	Chak De! India	91%				Advanced
3	Maithili Thakur	Sapno Se Bhare Naina	88%				Advanced
4	Afsana Khan	Lambi Judaai	86%				Advanced
5	Diljot Qawwali Group	Jai Ho / Akhiyan Udeek Diyan	85%				Advanced
6	Nikita Boro	Aashiyaan	88%				Advanced
7	Bannet Dosanjh	Sun Charkhe Di Kook	92%				Advanced
8	Ankita Sachdev	Chupke Se	83%				Eliminated
9	Ankita Kundu	Ye Dil Sun Raha Hai	89%				Advanced

=== Regional / devotional ===
The top 8 contestants sing a devotional song or a song in their regional language.

Episode 19: 8 April 2017

Order	Contestant	Song	Votes	Experts' choices			Result
Order	Contestant	Song	Votes	Shankar Mahadevan	Monali Thakur	Diljit Dosanjh	Result
1	Ameya Date	Deva Shree Ganesha	88%				Advanced
2	Ankita Kundu	Nimbooda Nimbooda	84%				Advanced
3	Vikram Jeet Singh	Bulla Ki Jaana	89%				Advanced
4	Maithili Thakur	Nagada Sang Dhol	89%				Advanced
5	Nikita Boro	Aika Dajiba	86%				Advanced
6	Diljot Qawwali Group	Shirdi Wale Sai Baba / Shaane Karam Ka	82%				Eliminated
7	Bannet Dosanjh	Nit Khair Manga	92%				Advanced
8	Afsana Khan	Resham Ka Rumaal	85%				Advanced

=== Retro Night ===
The top 7 contestants sang Hindi songs from the 1970s popularly known as the Retro era.

Episode 20: 9 April 2017

Order	Contestant	Song	Votes	Experts' choices			Result
Order	Contestant	Song	Votes	Shankar Mahadevan	Monali Thakur	Diljit Dosanjh	Result
1	Bannet Dosanjh	Yaad Aa Raha Hai Tera Pyaar	88.01%				Advanced
2	Maithili Thakur	Shaan Se	88.02%				Advanced
3	Ameya Date	Yeh Jawani Hai Deewani	75%				Advanced
4	Ankita Kundu	Rangeela Re Tere Rang Mein	86%				Advanced
5	Nikita Boro	Nisha	85%				Advanced
6	Vikram Jeet Singh	Main Jat Yamla Pagla Deewana	67%				Advanced
7	Afsana Khan	Jhoom Jhoom Jhoom Baba	62%				Eliminated

=== Ticket To Finale ===
The contestants compete to earn a direct entry to the finale week.

Episode 21: 15 April 2017

Order	Contestant	Song	Votes	Experts' choices			Result
Order	Contestant	Song	Votes	Shankar Mahadevan	Monali Thakur	Diljit Dosanjh	Result
1	Bannet Dosanjh	Lagan Lagan	84.90%				Advanced
2	Ameya Date	Aayat	58%				Eliminated
3	Nikita Boro	Pyaar Ki Yeh Kahani	83%				Advanced
4	Ankita Kundu	Piya Baawri	84.16%				Advanced
5	Maithili Thakur	Saanware Tore Bin Jiya	86%				Advanced
6	Vikram Jeet Singh	Layi Vi Na Gayi	89%				Advanced

Episode 22: 16 April 2017

Order	Contestant	Song	Votes	Experts' choices			Result
Order	Contestant	Song	Votes	Shankar Mahadevan	Monali Thakur	Diljit Dosanjh	Result
1	Ankita Kundu	Aaj Ki Raat / Raat Baaki	80%				Advanced
2	Nikita Boro	Zoobi Doobi / Eena Meen Deeka	63%				Eliminated
3	Bannet Dosanjh	Kadi Te Has Bol / Jee Karda	87%				Advanced
4	Maithili Thakur	Saawan Jeeto Jaaye / Jiya Lage Naa	88%				Advanced

Face-off for the Ticket to Finale

The two top scorers of Saturday and Sunday episode participate in a face-off round. In this round, the judges score of 21% will be given in whole to only one contestant who, according to them, performed better.

Order	Contestant	Song	Votes	Experts' choices			Result
Order	Contestant	Song	Votes	Shankar Mahadevan	Monali Thakur	Diljit Dosanjh	Result
1	Vikram Jeet Singh	Mera Yaar	61%				Proceeded to Finale Week
2	Maithili Thakur	Om Namah Shivaya	81%				Won the Ticket To Finale

=== Finale Week ===
Episode 23: 22 April 2017

The top 4 contestants sing duets along with playback singers Master Saleem, Neha Bhasin, Akriti Kakar and Jubin Nautiyal.

Order	Contestant	Celebrity Singer	Song	Votes	Experts' choices			Result
Order	Contestant	Celebrity Singer	Song	Votes	Shankar Mahadevan	Monali Thakur	Diljit Dosanjh	Result
1	Bannet Dosanjh	Master Saleem	Mast Kalandar	89%				Finalist
2	Ankita Kundu	Neha Bhasin	Kuch Khaas	80%				Proceeded to Takkar Round
3	Vikram Jeet Singh	Akriti Kakar	Marjaani	85%				Proceeded to Takkar Round

Finalist Maithili Thakur gave a guest performance along with Jubin Nautiyal and sang the song Bawra Mann.

Takkar

The two bottom scorers of the episode participate in a face-off round. In this round, the collective judges score of 21% will be given to only one contestant who, according to them, performed better.

Order	Contestant	Song	Votes	Experts' choices			Result
Order	Contestant	Song	Votes	Shankar Mahadevan	Monali Thakur	Diljit Dosanjh	Result
1	Ankita Kundu	Tere Bina Jiya Jaaye Na	76%				Advanced
2	Vikram Jeet Singh	Sultan	61%				Eliminated

Episode 24: 23 April 2017

The top 3 finalists Maithili Thakur, Bannet Dosanjh and Ankita Kundu compete in the first round. Each expert has 1% vote each as opposed to 7%. The top 2 contestants proceed to the Face-off round.

Order	Contestant	Song	Votes	Experts' choices			Result
Order	Contestant	Song	Votes	Shankar Mahadevan	Monali Thakur	Diljit Dosanjh	Result
1	Ankita Kundu	Kahin Aag Lage	69%				2nd Runner-up
2	Maithili Thakur	Morey Saiyan Toh / Soona Soona	82%				Advanced to top 2
3	Bannet Dosanjh	Tashan Mein	82%				Advanced to top 2

Face-off

The top 2 scorers of the episode participate in a face-off round. In this round, the experts have no voting power and the votes accumulated are only from the audience.

Order	Contestant	Song	Votes	Result
1	Maithili Thakur	Yaad Piya Ki Aaye	76%	1st runner-up
2	Bannet Dosanjh	Main Jahaan Rahoon	77%	Winner
