= Sa Re Ga Ma Pa Li'l Champs 2009 =

- Season 2009
- Starring: see below

Release
- Original network: Zee TV
- Original release: 5 June – 24 October 2009

Season chronology
- Next → 2011

Sa Re Ga Ma Pa L'il Champs 2009 (SRGMP) is the third season of the popular ZeeTV show Sa Re Ga Ma Pa L'il Champs. Going on air from 5 June 2009, the music reality show will feature 12 participants: 6 boys and 6 girls. The theme of the show this year is unique - Jeetenge World, Boys Ya Girls. The eliminations by public voting began on 5 August 2009. The season finale was held in Mumbai on Saturday 24 October 2009; the winner was Hemant Brijwasi.

== Judges ==
- Abhijeet Bhattacharya - Boys' Mentor
- Alka Yagnik - Girls' Mentor

== Guests ==
- Kailash Kher - 26 and 27 June
- Saif Ali Khan, Deepika Padukone, Pritam (to promote their movie Love Aaj Kal) - 3 July
- Pritam Imtiaz Ali Zaynah Vastani - 4 July
- Shaan - 10 and 11 July
- Kavita Krishnamurthy - 17 and 18 July
- Imran Khan, Ravi Kishan (to promote their movie Luck), and Udit Narayan - 24 July
- Udit Narayan - 25 July
- Sukhwinder Singh - 31 July and 1 August - Friendship Special
- Jatin Pandit, Suresh Wadkar, (to serve as the selection board for the Wild Card Entry) - 7 and 8 August
- Shahid Kapoor (to promote his movie Kaminey) - 14 August
- Daler Mehndi, Shreyas Talpade (to promote Shreyas' movie Aage Se Right) - 22 August
- David Dhawan, Govinda, Vashu Bhagnani, Sameer, Neeraj Shridhar, Anushka Manchanda, & Shravan (to promote Govinda's movie Do Knot Disturb) - 28 August
- Wadali brothers - 29 August
- Anandji Virji Shah, Mohammed Zahur Khayyam - 4 September
- Priyanka Chopra, Harman Baweja (to promote their movie What's Your Raashee?) - 5 September
- Asha Bhosle - 11 September
- Salman (Mohammed Ghouse) - 18 September
- Bappi Lahiri - 19 September
- Ratan Rajput & Manoj Tiwari - 24 September
- Emran Hashmi, Soha Ali Khan (to promote their film Tum Mile) - 25 September
- Sanjay Dutt, Ajay Devgan (to promote their movie All the Best: Fun Begins) - 2 October
- Zayed Khan (to promote his movie Blue) - 3 October
- Ritesh Deshmukh (to promote his movie Aladin) - 9 October
- Lara Dutta (to promote her film Blue) - 10 October
- Vishal–Shekhar (Vishal Dadlani & Shekhar Ravjiani) - 17 October
- Sukirti Kandpal, Abhishek Rawat, Priya Marathe to cheer the winner and also Ajay Devgn, Salman Khan and Asin (to promote their movie London Dreams - Finale

== Hosts ==
The hosts are 2 little kids. Afsha at first was auditioning as a contestant, and ended up being the hostess. Dhairya was already famous from few movies like: Partner (2007 film) and Baabul. Also from shows: Kya Aap Paanchvi Pass Se Tez Hain? and Ek Se Badhkar Ek.

- Afsha Musani
- Dhairya Sorecha

== Elimination Table ==
Name	City	Date of elimination
Debolina Halder	Kolkata	27 June
Farah Naaz	Lucknow	4 July
Yashodhan Rao Kadam	Delhi	11 July
Priyanka Maliya	Bikaner	25 July
Shalini Mukherjee	Kolkata	1 August
Abhijeet Srivastava	Lakhimpur Kheri	21 August
Shristi Bhandari	Delhi	28 August
Rahul Dutta	Kolkata	4 September
Antara Nandy	Tinsukia	18 September
Abhigyan Das	Duliajan	2 October
Prateeksha Shrivastava	Lucknow	9 October
Swarit Shukl	Indore	16 October

== Bottom 3 ==
21 August:

- Abhijeet Srivastava - OUT
- Shreyasi Bhattacharjee - Safe
- Shristi Bhandari - Safe

28 August:

- Shristi Bhandari - OUT
- Hemant Brijwasi - Safe
- Rahul Dutta - Safe

4 September:

- Rahul Dutta - OUT
- Prateeksha Shrivastav - Safe
- Antara Nandy - Safe

11 September: NO ELIMINATION (on Asha Bhosle's request)

- Hemant Brijwasi
- Antara Nandy
- Swarit Shukl

18 September:

- Abhigyan Das - Safe
- Shreyasi Bhattacharjee - Safe
- Antara Nandy - OUT

25 September: NO ELIMINATION

- Yatarth Ratnam Rastogi
- Prateeksha Shrivastava

2 October:

- Abhigyan Das - OUT
- Swarit Shukl - Safe

9 October:

- Prateeksha Shrivastava - OUT
- Hemant Brijwasi - Safe

16 October:

- Swarit Shukl - OUT

== 2009 Grand FINALE ==
- Hemant Brijwasi (from Mathura) - WINNER
- Yatharth Ratnum Rastogi (from Varanasi) - 1st runner-up
- Shreyasi Bhattacharjee (from Kolkata) - 2nd runner-up
