= Sa Re Ga Ma Pa Li'l Champs 2017 =

- Season 2017
- Suron Ka Dangal
- No. of episodes: 69

Release
- Original network: Zee TV
- Original release: 25 February – 29 October 2017

Season chronology
- ← Previous; 2014 Next → 2019

Sa Re Ga Ma Pa L'il Champs 2017 (stylised as Saregamapa Li'l Champs) is an Indian singing competition television series which premiered on 25 February 2017 on Zee TV. In a back-to-school format that lends itself to a spirited atmosphere of camaraderie and fun, the L’il Champs represent their schools.

For the first time in L'il Champs, they have incorporated the format created for Sa Re Ga Ma Pa 2016. There is a 30-member Grand Jury which grades the contestants and the average percentage of their scores is displayed. Himesh Reshammiya, Neha Kakkar and Javed Ali are the mentors in the show, whereas Aditya Narayan is the host. The show went off air on 29 October 2017 following the Great Grand Finale in Jaipur. Shreyan Bhattacharya and Anjali Gaikwad were announced as the winners.

== Format ==
Children aged 5–14 years participate in a singing competition. In the auditions round, they have 100 seconds to impress the three judges and the 30 members of the grand jury. If two of the three judges say yes and they secure at least 50 percent of the support of the grand jury, then the contestant progresses to the next round.

In the Gala round, the judges select the student of the week who they consider the best performer. The contestant gets to sit on a 'flying sofa', which indicates that the contestant is safe from next week's elimination.

The audience vote will come in later in the competition. The contestant with the highest votes in the final round will win the competition.

== Grand jury ==
The show has a panel of 30 jury members who are experts from the music industry. They closely assess the contestants from the audition stage wherein they help the mentors in the selection process and are present in the show during the studio rounds too.

Some of them are:

- Pandit Ajay Pohankar (classical maestro)
- Ami Mishra (singer, composer)
- Amit Mishra (singer)
- Aneek Dhar (singer, winner of Sa Re Ga Ma Pa Challenge 2007)
- Arpita Mukherjee (singer), winner of Sa Re Ga Ma Pa: Golden Voice Hunt)
- Arvinder Singh (singer)
- Asees Kaur (singer)
- Bhavya Pandit (singer, contestant of Indian Idol Season 4)
- Chintu Singh (guitarist)
- Debojit Saha (singer, winner of Sa Re Ga Ma Pa Challenge 2005)
- Earl Edgar URL (rapper, singer)
- Eric Pillai (mixing engineer & music producer)
- Ghanshyam Vaswani (singer)
- Hamsika Iyer (singer)
- Hrishikesh Chury (singer)
- Jalees Sherwani (lyricist)
- Jasraj Jayant Joshi (singer, winner of Sa Re Ga Ma Pa Challenge 2012)
- Jolly Mukherjee (singer)
- Kamal Khan (singer, winner of Sa Re Ga Ma Pa Singing Superstar)
- Kiran Kamath (music producer, DJ)
- Manasi Scott (singer, songwriter)
- Murtaza Khan (singer)
- Nandini Srikar (singer)
- Nikhil Paul George (singer, record producer & composer)
- Padma Wadkar (singer, winner of the first series of Sa Re Ga Ma in 1995)
- DJ Paroma (celebrity DJ)
- Pavni Pandey (singer)
- Prashant Ingole (lyricist)
- Raja Hasan (singer, contestant on Sa Re Ga Ma Pa Challenge 2007)
- Ram Shankar (singer and composer)
- Raman Mahadevan (singer)
- Ranjeet Rajwada (singer, contestant on Sa Re Ga Ma Pa Singing Superstar)
- Ronu Majumdar (flautist)
- Sachin Kumar Valmiki (singer, contestant on Sa Re Ga Ma Pa 2016)
- Sandeep Batraa (singer, contestant on Sa Re Ga Ma Pa Challenge 2005 and Fame Gurukul)
- Sarfraz Ahmed Khan (Sufi maestro)
- Shabbir Ahmed (lyricist)
- Shamsher Singh (composer, brother of Daler Mehndi and Mika Singh)
- Shashi Suman (singer and composer)
- Shibani Kashyap (singer)
- Shriram Iyer (singer)
- Sumedha Karmahe (singer, contestant on Sa Re Ga Ma Pa Challenge 2007)
- Suzanne D'Mello (singer)
- Vaishali Mhade (singer, winner of Sa Re Ga Ma Pa Challenge 2009)
- Dr. Vinod Hasal (Kathak exponent)
- Vipin Aneja (singer)
- Yashita Yashpal Sharma (singer, contestant on Sa Re Ga Ma Pa Challenge 2009)
- Kavita Paudwal (bhajan and playback singer)

== Top 14 Contestants ==
Contestant	Age (in years)	From	Result
Shreyan Bhattacharya	11	Midnapur West Bengal	Winner
Sonakshi Kar	13	Kolkata West Bengal	Finalist
Shanmukha Priya	14	Visakhapatnam Andhra Pradesh	Finalist
Dhroon Tickoo	11	Amritsar Punjab	Finalist
Adnan Hussain Sabri	12	Mumbai Maharashtra	Eliminated
Jasu Khan Mir	13	Rajasthan	Eliminated
Rajashree Bag	14	Kolkata West Bengal	Eliminated
Riya Biswas	13	Kolkata West Bengal	Eliminated
Saimann Sewa	13	Siliguri	Eliminated
Satyajeet Jena	12	Bhubaneshwar Odisha	Quit
Shaktiswaroopa Panda	9	Odisha	Eliminated
Tanya Tiwari	13	Varanasi Uttar Pradesh	Eliminated
Utkarsh Wankhede	11	Nagpur Maharashtra	Eliminated
Yumna Ajin	11	Kerala	Eliminated

- Jayas Kumar, a 5-year-old boy from Delhi is a special non-competitive participant of the show retained only for cute singing. He won the Little Genius Award from Zee TV.

== Extra challengers ==
Challenger	Age (in years)	From	Result
Anjali Gaikwad	11	Ahmednagar Maharashtra	Winner
Vaishnav Girish	14	Thrissur Kerala	Runner-up
Nandini Gaikwad	14	Ahmednagar Maharashtra	Eliminated
Bidipta Chakraborty	12	Kolkata West Bengal	Eliminated
Aftab Singh	10	Faridkhot Punjab	Eliminated
