= Sa Re Ga Ma Pa Bangla =

Indian singing show

- Latest 25th anniversary cover photo
- Genre: Singing show
- Directed by: Avijit Sen
- Presented by: Debojit Saha (2007—2008); Saheb Bhattacharya (2009—2011); Jisshu Sengupta (2012—2019); Abir Chatterjee (2020—2025)
- Country of origin: India
- Original language: Bengali
- No. of seasons: 22

Production
- Camera setup: Multi-camera
- Running time: 90 minutes

Original release
- Network: Zee Bangla
- Release: 4 December 2006 – present

Sa Re Ga Ma Pa Bangla is a Bengali language singing reality show which airs on Zee Bangla. At very beginning it was hosted by actor Jisshu Sengupta from 2012 to 2019. The show is currently hosted by Abir Chatterjee from 2020 to present.

== Hosts ==
Season	Year	Host
1	2006- 2007	Debojit Saha
2	2007	Abhijit Ghoshal
3	2007	Debojit Saha, Suchismita
4	2007	Debojit Saha
5	2007- 2008	Saheb Bhattacharya
6	2008	Aneek Dhar / Saheb Bhattacharya
7	2008	Aneek Dhar
8	2009	Saheb Bhattacharya
9	2009	Saheb Bhattacharya
10	2010	Babul Supriyo
11	2010	Saheb Bhattacharya
12	2011	Saheb Bhattacharya; Aneek Dhar
13	2012-13	Jisshu Sengupta
14	2013-14	Jisshu Sengupta
15	2014	Jisshu Sengupta
16	2015-16	Jisshu Sengupta
17	2016-17	Jisshu Sengupta
18	2018-19	Jisshu Sengupta
19	2020-21	Abir Chatterjee
20	2022-23	Abir Chatterjee
21	2024-25	Abir Chatterjee
22	2025-26	Abir Chatterjee

== Seasons ==
No.	Season	Year	Winner	Host	Judges	Ref.
1	Sa Re Ga Ma Pa 2006-2007	2006-2007	1st: Aneek Dhar 2nd: Trisha Parui 3rd: Rathijit Bhattacharjee	Debojit Saha	Sipra Bose, Ravindra Jain, Ajoy Chakraborty, Mitali Mukherjee, Banashree Sengupta, Talat Aziz, Usha Uthup, Shantanu Moitra	
2	Sa Re Ga Ma Pa Sat Sure Rupkatha	2007	1st: Sourav Sorkar 2nd: Anwesshaa	Abhijit Ghoshal	Sudesh Bhosale, Sadhana Sargam, Jolly Mukherjee/Zubeen Garg	
3	Sa Re Ga Ma Pa Tumi Na Ami	2007	1st: Mollar, Olivia 2nd: Ahana, Chanchal	Debojit Saha , Suchismita	Madhushree, Haimanti Sukla	
4	Sa Re Ga Ma Pa 2007	2007	1st: Soumen Nandi	Debojit Saha	Sipra Bose, Kumar Sanu, Shantanu Moitra	
5	Sa Re Ga Ma Pa Li'l Champs 2007-2008	2008	1st: Abhigyan	Saheb Bhattacharya	Kumar Sanu, Zubeen Garg, Mitali Mukherjee	
6	Sa Re Ga Ma Pa Viswa Shera	2008	1st: Dipanwita Chowdhury	Aneek Dhar /Saheb Bhattacharya	Shantanu Moitra, Kumar Sanu, Runa Laila	
7	Sa Re Ga Ma Pa (Only for Blind participants)	2008		Aneek Dhar	Jojo, Sapna Mukherjee, Indranil Sen	
8	Sa Re Ga Ma Pa Li'l Champs 2009	2009	1st: Rahul Dutta 2nd: Ahenjita 3rd: Papri	Saheb Bhattacharya	Shantanu Moitra, Jojo, Babul Supriyo	
9	Sa Re Ga Ma Pa Duet Champs	2009	1st: Rahul-Papri	Saheb Bhattacharya	Usha Uthup, Rupankar Bagchi, Mohit Chauhan	
10	Sa Re Ga Ma Pa Mr/Miss Universe	2010	1st: 2nd: Kinjal Chatterjee	Babul Supriyo	Amit Kumar, Aparna Sen, Usha Uthup, Haimanti Sukla, Shantanu Moitra	
11	Sa Re Ga Ma Pa Li'l Champs 2010	2010	1st: Shreshthanshu Dutta 2nd: Niladri Chatterjee 3rd: Debasmita Roy	Saheb Bhattacharya/ Kinjal Chatterjee	Kumar Sanu, Monali Thakur, Haimanti Shukla, Abhijeet Bhattacharya, Kavita Krishnamurti, Haimanti Sukla	
12	Sa Re Ga Ma Pa Li'l Champs 2011	2011	Aishwarya Saha	Saheb Bhattacharya/Aneek Dhar	Shantanu Moitra, Monali Thakur, Sadhana Sargam/Babul Supriyo, Kaushiki Chakraborty	
13	Sa Re Ga Ma Pa 2012	2012-2013	Shovan Ganguly; Kushal Paul	Jisshu Sengupta	Kumar Sanu, Alka Yagnik, Joy Sarkar	
14	Sa Re Ga Ma Pa Li'l Champs 2013	2013	Arunita Kanjilal	Jisshu Sengupta	Kumar Sanu, Haimanti Shukla, Mahalakshmi Iyer, Joy Sarkar, Akriti Kakar, Kaushiki Chakraborty	
15	Sa Re Ga Ma Pa 2014	2014	1st: Anwesha Dutta 2nd: Rik Basu	Jisshu Sengupta	Kumar Sanu, Alka Yagnik, Hariharan	
16	Sa Re Ga Ma Pa 2015-16	2015-16	[Multiple Winners] Soumya Chakraborty (Overall Winner), Aditi Munshi (Aparesh Lahiri Memorial Award) Durnibar Saha (Winner of Modern Song Group), DipanMitra (Winner of Classical Song Group), Tulika-Gangadhar (Winner of Folk Song Group)	Jisshu Sengupta	Shantanu Moitra, Monali Thakur, Shubha Mudgal, Palash Sen	
17	Sa Re Ga Ma Pa 2016-17	2016-17	1st: Jimut Roy Viewers Choice Winner: Sayamh Paul 2nd: Subhasree Debnath 3rd: Sayamh Paul	Jisshu Sengupta	Shantanu Moitra, Jeet Ganguli, Palak Muchhal, Madhushree	
18	Sa Re Ga Ma Pa 2018-19	2018-19	1st: Ankita Bhattacharyya2nd: Gourab Sarkar 3rd: Mainul Ahsan Noble	Jisshu Sengupta	Srikanto Acharya, Monali Thakur, Shantanu Moitra	
19	Sa Re Ga Ma Pa 2020-21	2020-21	1st: Arkodeep Mishra 2nd: Niharika Nath 3rd: Swarnali Chakraborty Viewers Choice Award: Anushka Patra	Abir Chatterjee	Srikanto Acharya, Akriti Kakkar, Mika Singh, Joy Sarkar	
20	Sa Re Ga Ma Pa Bangla 2022	2022-23	Winner: Ashmita Kar and Poddopolash Haldar 1st Runner Up- Albert Kabo Lepcha 2nd Runner Up- Sharmistha Das	Abir Chatterjee	Srikanto Acharya, Richa Sharma, Shantanu Moitra	
21	Sa Re Ga Ma Pa Bangla 2024	2024-25	Senior Winner- Deyashini Roy Junior Winner- Atanu Mishra 1st Runner Up(Senior)- Mayuri Darani and Sai Shastri 1st Runner Up(Junior)- Aishi Chakraborty 2nd Runner Up(Senior)- Satyajit Deb Roy 2nd Runner Up(Junior)- Anik Jana	Abir Chatterjee	Shantanu Moitra, Antara Mitra, Javed Ali, Jojo Mukherjee, Kaushiki Chakraborty, Indradeep Dasgupta, Iman Chakraborty, Raghab Chatterjee	
22	Sa Re Ga Ma Pa Bangla 2025	2025-26	Winner: Ayush Gupta 1st Runner-Up- Gitashree Chowdhury 2nd Runner-Up- Srijan Porail 3rd Runner-Up- Sayantani Ghosh 4th Runner-Up- Biswapriya Chakraborty Viewers Choice Award of the Season- Ayush Gupta Kalika Prasad Bhattacharya Special Award- Gitashree Chowdhury	Abir Chatterjee	Sreeradha Bandopadhyay , Jeet Gannguli, Shantanu Moitra , Kaushiki Chakraborty , Rupam Islam , Jojo Mukherjee , Antara Mitra , Rupankar Bagchi , Subhamita Banerjee	

== Grand master ==
Asha Bhosle was the Grand Master for the 15th season in 2014. In 2023, Pandit Ajoy Chakrabarty was present as the Grand Master.

== See also ==
- Sa Re Ga Ma Pa Hindi
- Sa Re Ga Ma Pa Kannada
- Sa Re Ga Ma Pa Keralam
- Sa Re Ga Ma Pa Marathi
- Sa Re Ga Ma Pa Tamil
- Sa Re Ga Ma Pa Telugu
