= Ei Jibon Nohoi Xuna Bondhu =

Studio album by Various artists
- Released: 5 February 2010
- Recorded: October 2009 – January 2010: AB Sound (Mumbai); Sana Music World (Mumbai); Lucky Strings (Guwahati); Studio Rang (Guwahati)
- Genre: Pop
- Length: 59:04
- Language: Assamese
- Label: Encore Entertainment India
- Producers: Dr. Amal Saikia, Bhargav Saikia

Ei Jibon Nohoi Xuna Bondhu is an Assamese music album, released on 5 February 2010.

The album has 10 songs by popular singers like Alka Yagnik, Kavita Krishnamurthy, Pulak Banerjee, Debojit Saha, Luna Bharali Das, Debajit Choudhury and Sa Re Ga Ma Pa Lil' Champs (2009) contestant Antara Nandy. Veteran Assamese film actor Pranjal Saikia has narrated the themes of each song. Lyrics are written by Dr. Amal Saikia with music by Pratul Bora and Gupta Borthakur and music arrangement by Ranjib Das. The songs highlight several issues which are relevant in modern-day Indian society.

Ei Jibon Nohoi Xuna Bondhu garnered rave reviews from all leading regional newspapers. The Assam Tribune highly praised the album saying, "The title song (Ei Jibon Nohoi) can be regarded as one of the best among contemporary Assamese modern songs." Bilingual e-magazine Enajori.com described it as 'an exceptional album with powerful lyrics and great voices'. The title song, Xetelite Xui (which highlights one of the most controversial topics of recent times – illegal Bangladeshi immigration in Assam), Mor Bhaab Bor, Mama, O' Tomoxa and Nirahar Xixutir were highly praised.

This is the first independent Assamese album which is being sold in digital format on iTunes and Amazon MP3. According to Encore Entertainment India, a portion of sales proceeds from the album would be contributed in aid of physically challenged children.

Ei Jibon Nohoi Xuna Bondhu is Antara Nandy's debut music album.

== Track list ==
Number	Song title	Length	Singer
1	Ei Jibon Nohoi (Male Version)	5:33	Pulak Banerjee
2	Xetelite Xui	5:01	Alka Yagnik
3	Mor Bhaab Bor	6:28	Debojit Saha
4	Mama	3:46	Antara Nandy
5	Rini Rini	5:51	Debajit Choudhury, Luna Bharali Das
6	O' Tomoxa	6:46	Kavita Krishnamurthy
7	Nirahar Xixutir	5:53	Pulak Banerjee
8	Anubhutie Mor	4:18	Luna Bharali Das
9	Mon Tulikare	5:48	Luna Bharali Das, Debajit Choudhury
10	Ei Jibon Nohoi (Female Version)	5:33	Antara Nandy
