= Rising Star (Indian TV series) season 2 =

Indian Television show

Rising Star
- Season 2
- No. of episodes: 25

Release
- Original network: Colors TV
- Original release: 20 January – 15 April 2018

Season chronology
- ← Previous; Season 1 Next → Season 3

Rising Star is the second Indian version of the international franchise series Rising Star, a reality television singing competition. This is first time when Rising Star does not come with any present sponsor. This season earlier had an age limit of 4–13 years but when singers more than 13 years of age came for audition, the channel decided to change the age limit to 4 years and above. It is based on the Israeli singing competition HaKokhav HaBa (meaning The Next Star) created by Keshet Broadcasting Ltd.

The program format lets the viewers vote for contestants live via the television channel's mobile app. The show premiered on 20 January 2018 on Colors TV. This is the first reality television show in India which involves Live Audience Voting through Voot App.

Popular playback singer and music director Shankar Mahadevan, playback singer and actor Monali Thakur and actor-singer Diljit Dosanjh return as the experts in the show.

The show is hosted by TV Actor Ravi Dubey. The winner of Rising Star Season 2 is Hemant Brijwasi.

== Format ==
In contrast to other singing competition TV shows which feature a cast of celebrity judges, Rising Star features a cast of celebrity experts and considers the viewers at home the judges. During each performance, the audience at home is able to decide in real time whether or not a contestant is sent through to the next round by using a mobile voting app.

While the viewers at home are considered the "judges", the expert panelists also may influence the vote but with continuously decreasing percentage votes over the total public vote and not exceeding 5% of the total voting power.

=== The Auditions ===
The first round where the acts are individually called to perform. As a reportage of the announced performer is shown, viewers are invited to register for voting for that specific act. Following a countdown of three seconds, the candidate has to start performing behind a screen called "The Wall".

With start of performance, the voting kicks in. Registered voters have the option of voting just "Yes" or "No". Non-votes are also considered "No" votes. If an expert votes "Yes", another 5% is added to the tally of the contestant. The contestants also see random photos of voters in their favour. Faces of panelists voting "Yes" are also shown in larger frames.

Once the contestant reaches 80% of "Yes" votes, the wall is raised and the contestant goes to the next round of the competition.

=== The Duels ===
Contestants who make it through the auditions are paired by the judges to face off in a duel. The first contestant sings with the wall up and sets the benchmark for the second contestant. The second contestant sings with the wall down. If the second contestant betters the first contestant's vote total, the wall rises and the second contestant was through to the next round while the first contestant is eliminated; if the second contestant fails to raise the wall, the second contestant is eliminated and the first contestant goes through.

== Series details ==
=== The Live Auditions ===
The Live auditions began on 20 January 2018 and went on till 4 February 2018.

Episode Date	Contestant	Age (in years)	From	Song	Votes	Expert's Choices			Result
Episode Date	Contestant	Age (in years)	From	Song	Votes	Shankar Mahadevan	Monali Thakur	Diljit Dosanjh	Result
Jan 20	Rohanpreet Singh	23	Patiala	Dil Diyan Gallan	95%				Advanced
Jan 20	Mamta Raut	31	Ranchi	Baghban	86%				Advanced
Jan 20	Aman Biswal	12	Bhubaneshwar	Om Namah Shivay + Albela Sajan	89%				Advanced
Jan 20	Debanjali Chaterjee	29	Kolkata	Har Kisi Ko	90%				Advanced
Jan 20	Sriprasanna Pendyalaya	21	Visakhapatnam	Sun Saathiya	94%				Advanced
Jan 20	Friendship Band	24-27	Lucknow	Mehbooba Mehbooba + ...	80%				Advanced
Jan 21	Dr. Sudeep Ranjan	24	Boko, Assam	Khamoshiyan	93%				Advanced
Jan 21	Soham & Chaitanya	10 & 12	Alandi, Pune	Dagabaaz Re	94%				Advanced
Jan 21	Iswari Behera	21	Sambhalpur, Odisha	Dua	77%				Eliminated
Jan 21	Srushti & Varsha Barlemwar	23 & 48	Nagpur	Saiyaan Dil Mein Aana Re	66%				Eliminated
Jan 21	Ridham Kalyan	18	Amritsar	Aaj Ibaadat	83%				Advanced
Jan 21	Rajnigandha Shekhawat	43	Jaipur, Rajasthan	Badrinath Ki Dulhania + Holiya Me Ude Re Gulal	74%				Eliminated
Jan 21	Ashwin Prabhu	22	Bengaluru	Tumse Milke Dil Ka Hai Jo Haal	89%				Advanced
Jan 21	Afreen Group	18-24	Jalandar	Naina Thag Lenge + Kajra Re	94%				Advanced
Jan 27	Nigam Brothers	22 & 31	Lucknow	Dil Se Re + Maa Tujhe Salaam	91%				Advanced
Jan 27	Prakruthi Reddy	8	Bangalore, Karnataka	Nagada Sang Dhol	67%				Eliminated
Jan 27	Alankar Mahtolia	23	New Delhi	Chunar	86%				Advanced
Jan 27	Manganiyar Fusion	21-27	Jaisalmer, Rajasthan	Saree Ke Fall Sa	90%				Advanced
Jan 27	Raenit Singh	23	New Delhi	Moh Moh Ke Dhaage	94%				Advanced
Jan 27	Raman Kapoor	27	Gurugram, Haryana	Rang De Basanti	80%				Advanced
Jan 27	Mohd Rehan Quraishi	28	Lucknow	Aas Paas Khuda	73%				Eliminated
Jan 28	Sindhu Wadekar	60	Maharashtra	Hansta Hua Noorani Chehra	89%				Advanced
Jan 28	Akhtar Brothers	21 & 23	Punjab	Sultan	93%				Advanced
Jan 28	Shashank Sekhar	28	Bhubaneswar	Teri Meri Kahaani	94%				Advanced
Jan 28	Vishnumaya Ramesh	12	Kerala	Jiya Jale	93%				Advanced
Jan 28	Jyoti Sharma	18	Guwahati	Parda Parda	66%				Eliminated
Jan 28	The Harmony Chorus	10-16	Bengaluru	Kal Ho Naa Ho + Choti Si Aasha + Taare Zameen Par	93%				Advanced
Jan 28	Sakshi Ratti	21	Ludhiana, Punjab	Kamli	66%				Eliminated
Jan 28	Sagar Mhatre	20	Navi Mumbai, Maharashtra	Dil Ki Tapish	94%				Advanced
Feb 3	Zaid Ali	10	Muzaffarnagar, Uttar Pradesh	Mere Rashke Qamar	91%				Advanced
Feb 3	Vishal Srivastava	34	New Delhi	Ab Tere Bin	63%				Eliminated
Feb 3	Arya Nandini	17	Ambikapur, Chhattisgarh	Ghoomar	91%				Advanced
Feb 3	Jaya Piyush	40	Mumbai	Hothon Mein Aisi Baat	92%				Advanced
Feb 3	Anmol Jaswal	19	Jammu	Sapnon Se Bhare Naina	76%				Eliminated
Feb 3	Mehrnangori Rustam	23	Tajikistan	Khatooba	74%				Eliminated
Feb 3	Kumar Sahil	25	Kangra, Himachal Pradesh	Ramta Jogi	78%				Eliminated
Feb 4	Chetan Brijwasi	11	Mathura	Haanikaarak Bapu	93%				Advanced
Feb 4	Ajay Brijwasi	14	Mathura	Dil Haara	94%				Advanced
Feb 4	Hosiyaar Brijwasi	16	Mathura	O saiyaan	94%				Advanced
Feb 4	Hemant Brijwasi	20	Mathura	Tashan Mein	94%				Advanced
Feb 4	Akhil R Pillai	27	Alleppey, Kerala	Bulleya	69%				Eliminated
Feb 4	Supriya Joshi	34	Mumbai	Gulaabo	88%				Advanced
Feb 4	Archit Patidia	21	Ahmedabad, Gujarat	Maduban Me Radhika Nache	94%				Advanced

=== Duels Ki Takkar ===
The top 31 scorers from the auditions moved on to the second round named 'Duels Ki Takkar' which began on 10 February 2018. The contestants who qualify from this round move on to the quarterfinals.

==== Episode 7: 10 February 2018 ====
- Guests: Manish Paul and Iulia Vântur

Order	Contestant	Song	Votes	Experts' Choices			Result
Order	Contestant	Song	Votes	Shankar Mahadevan	Monali Thakur	Diljit Dosanjh	Result
1	Dr. Sudeep Ranjan	Saawariya	63%				Advanced
1	Ashwin Prabhu	Ae Dil Hai Mushkil	50%				Eliminated
2	Vishnumaya Ramesh	Kehna Hi Kya	93%				Advanced
2	Soham & Chaitanya	Khaike Paan Banaraswala	89%				Eliminated
3	Debanjali Chaterjee	Jiya Re	68%				Eliminated
3	Mamta Raut	Saiyyan	85%				Advanced
4	Rohanpreet Singh	Aaj Din Chadheya	92%				Advanced
4	Raenit Singh	Janam Janam	90%				Eliminated

==== Episode 8: 11 February 2018 ====
- Guest: Sukhwinder Singh

Order	Contestant	Song	Votes	Experts' Choices			Result
Order	Contestant	Song	Votes	Shankar Mahadevan	Monali Thakur	Diljit Dosanjh	Result
1	Afreen Group	Chand Sifarish + Aaj Phir	90%				Advanced
1	Ajay Brijwasi	Lagan Lagi	88%				Eliminated
2	Hosiyaar Brijwasi	Darmiyaan	70%				Advanced
2	Raman Kapoor	Main Jahan Rahoon	48%				Eliminated
3	Supriya Joshi	Maahi Ve	60%				Eliminated
3	Hemant Brijwasi	Upar Khuda	94%				Advanced
4	Zaid Ali	Saiyyan	88%				Advanced
4	Chetan Brijwasi	Jee Karda	87%				Eliminated

==== Episode 9: 17 February 2018 ====
- Guest: Gurdas Mann

Order	Contestant	Song	Votes	Experts' Choices			Result
Order	Contestant	Song	Votes	Shankar Mahadevan	Monali Thakur	Diljit Dosanjh	Result
1	Akhtar Brothers	Chaiyya Chaiyya	92%				Advanced
1	Nigam Brothers	Khalbali + Pathaka Guddi + Nadan	83%				Eliminated
2	Arya Nandini	Barso Re	56%				Eliminated
2	Alankar Mahtolia	Abhi Mujh Mein Kahin	66%				Advanced
2	Ridham Kalyan	Ainvayi Ainvayi	90%				Advanced
3	Sagar Mhatre	Laaga Chunari Mein Daag	75%				Advanced
3	Archit Patidia	Bhor Bhaye	52%				Eliminated

==== Episode 10: 18 February 2018 ====
- Guest: Sonakshi Sinha & Raftaar

Order	Contestant	Song	Votes	Experts' Choices			Result
Order	Contestant	Song	Votes	Shankar Mahadevan	Monali Thakur	Diljit Dosanjh	Result
1	Harmony Chorus	Eena Meena Deeka + Dil Dhadakne Do	88.95%				Advanced
1	Manganiyar Fusion	Sawar Loon + Tere Mast Mast...	88.49%				Eliminated
2	Sriprasanna Pendyalaya	Ni Main Samajhh Gayi	72%				Eliminated
2	Shashank Sekhar	Muskurane	89%				Advanced
3	Jaya Piyush	Rangeela re	90%				Advanced
3	Friendship Band	Yamma Yamma + Shaan Se	49%..				Eliminated
4	Sindhu Wadekar	O Mungada Mungada	77%				Eliminated
4	Aman Biswal	Bol Do Na Zara	87%				Advanced

=== India's Favourite 16 + Duets Challenge ===
The Top 16 contestants compete in this round. Eight teams of two perform in duets. The first team perform with the wall up and set the target percentage. The next teams perform with the wall down and attempt to beat the target score. The duo with the least score move to the Red Sofa (unsafe zone). The team with the lowest score gets eliminated.

Episode 11: 24 February 2018

- Guest: Richa Sharma

Order	Contestant	Song	Votes	Experts' Choices			Result
Order	Contestant	Song	Votes	Shankar Mahadevan	Monali Thakur	Diljit Dosanjh	Result
1	Afreen Group	Billo Rani + Humka Peeni Hain	89%				Advanced
1	Mamta Raut	Billo Rani + Humka Peeni Hain	89%				Advanced
2	Rohanpreet Singh	Samjhawan	90%				Advanced
2	Vishnumaya Ramesh	Samjhawan	90%				Advanced
3	Jaya Piyush	Manwa Laage	88%				Advanced
3	Shashank Sekhar	Manwa Laage	88%				Advanced
4	Dr. Sudeep Ranjan	Jai Ho + Roobaroo	86%				Advanced
4	The Harmony Chorus	Jai Ho + Roobaroo	86%				Advanced
5	Zaid Ali	Arziyan	92%				Advanced
5	Hosiyaar Brijwasi	Arziyan	92%				Advanced
6	Akhtar Brothers	Mast Kalandar	94%				Advanced
6	Hemant Brijwasi	Mast Kalandar	94%				Advanced
7	Alankar Mahtolia	Dhan The Nan	54%				Eliminated
7	Ridham Kalyan	Dhan The Nan	54%				Eliminated
8	Sagar Mhatre	Tere Naina	88%				Advanced
8	Aman Biswal	Tere Naina	88%				Advanced

=== Tribute to Sridevi ===
The Top 14 contestants compete in this round. As the round progresses, the contestant who receives fewest votes at that point of the competition moves to the Red Sofa. At the end of the episode, the contestant who sits on the Red Sofa gets eliminated.

==== Episode 12: 3 March 2018 ====
- Guest: Alka Yagnik

Order	Contestant	Song	Votes	Experts' Choices			Result
Order	Contestant	Song	Votes	Shankar Mahadevan	Monali Thakur	Diljit Dosanjh	Result
1	The Harmony Chorus	English Vinglish + Na Jaane + Navrai Majhi	87%				Advanced
2	Mamta Raut	Morni Baaga Ma Bole	84%				Advanced
3	Rohanpreet Singh	Aye Zindagi Gale Laga Le	90%				Advanced
4	Jaya Piyush	Mere Haathon Mein	65%				Advanced
5	Hosiyaar Brijwasi	Lagi Aaj Sawan Ki	53%				Eliminated
6	Aman Biswal	Surmayee Ankhyion Mein	91%				Advanced
7	Akhtar Brothers	Mujhe Ek Pal Chain Na Aaye	90%				Advanced

==== Episode 13: 4 March 2018 ====
- Guest: Kavita Krishnamurthy

Order	Contestant	Song	Votes	Experts' Choices			Result
Order	Contestant	Song	Votes	Shankar Mahadevan	Monali Thakur	Diljit Dosanjh	Result
1	Afreen Group	Naino Mein + Main Teri Dushman	85%				Advanced
2	Vishnumaya Ramesh	Hawa Hawai	93%				Advanced
3	Shashank Shekhar	Neele Neele Ambar Par	88%				Advanced
4	Zaid Ali	Tu Mujhe Kabool	90%				Advanced
5	Sagar Mhatre	Kabhi Main Kahoon Kabhi Tu	51%				Eliminated
6	Hemant Brijwasi	Meri Zindagi Ek Pyaas	93%				Advanced
7	Dr. Sudeep Ranjan	Kate Nahin Kat Te	78%				Advanced

=== Hero No. 1 (Ep14) & Salaam-E-Ishq (Ep15) ===
The Top 12 contestants compete in this round. As the round progresses, the contestant who receives fewest votes at that point of the competition moves to the Red Sofa. At the end of the episode, the contestant who sits on the Red Sofa gets eliminated.

==== Episode 14: 10 March 2018 ====
- Guest: Govinda

Order	Contestant	Song	Votes	Experts' Choices			Result
Order	Contestant	Song	Votes	Shankar Mahadevan	Monali Thakur	Diljit Dosanjh	Result
1	Shashank Shekhar	Main Toh Raste Se Ha Raha Tha	85%				Advanced
2	Mamta Raut	Prem Jaal	88%				Advanced
3	Vishnumaya Ramesh	Sona Kitna Sona Hai	88%				Advanced
4	Afreen Group	UP Wala Thumka + Suno Sasur Ji	87%				Advanced
5	Hemant Brijwasi	Kaha Raja Bhoj Kaha Gangu Teli	93%				Advanced
6	Aman Biswal	Kisi Disco Mein Jaaye	83%				Eliminated

==== Episode 15: 11 March 2018 ====
- Guest: Tiger Shroff and Disha Patani

Order	Contestant	Song	Votes	Experts' Choices			Result
Order	Contestant	Song	Votes	Shankar Mahadevan	Monali Thakur	Diljit Dosanjh	Result
1	Rohanpreet Singh	Channa Mereya	92%				Advanced
2	Jaya Piyush	O Mere Sona Re Sona Re	84%				Advanced
3	Akhtar Brothers	Mera Yaar	90%				Advanced
4	Zaid Ali	Main Nikla Gaddi Leke	94%				Advanced
5	The Harmony Chorus	Mere Mehboob + Maahi Ve + Mehndi	83%				Advanced
6	Dr. Sudeep Ranjan	I Love You	54%				Eliminated

=== Guru Sishya (Ep16) & Bachpan Ke Suhane Din (Ep17) ===
Wild Card Twist: Some of the eliminated contestants were brought back for another chance. Raenit Singh, Aman Biswal & Chetan Brijvasi.

The Top 12 contestants compete in this round. As the round progresses, the contestant who receives fewest votes at that point of the competition moves to the Red Sofa. At the end of the episode, the contestant who sits on the Red Sofa gets eliminated.

==== Episode 16: 17 March 2018 ====
- Guest: Rani Mukerji

WILD CARD

Order	Contestant	Song	Votes	Experts' Choices			Result
Order	Contestant	Song	Votes	Shankar Mahadevan	Monali Thakur	Diljit Dosanjh	Result
1	Chetan Brijwasi	Baawre	83%				Won Re-entry
2	Raenit Singh	Kurbaan Hua	84%				Won Re-entry
3	Aman Biswal	Bijuria	79%				Couldn't make a come-back

Top 12

Order	Contestant	Song	Votes	Experts' Choices			Result
Order	Contestant	Song	Votes	Shankar Mahadevan	Monali Thakur	Diljit Dosanjh	Result
1	Mamta Raut	Aga Bai	86.96%				Advanced
2	The Harmony Chorus	O Humdum Sonio Re + Dhakka Laga Mukka	86.86%				Advanced
3	Vishnumaya Ramesh	Chupske Se	91%				Advanced
4	Jaya Piyush	Hum Tum	75%				Eliminated
5	Akhtar Brothers	Jiya Lage Na	91%				Advanced

==== Episode 17: 18 March 2018 ====
- Guest: Shaan & Manish Paul

Order	Contestant	Song	Votes	Experts' Choices			Result
Order	Contestant	Song	Votes	Shankar Mahadevan	Monali Thakur	Diljit Dosanjh	Result
1	Zaid Ali	Piya Haji Ali	93%				Advanced
2	Rohanpreet Singh	Layi Vi Na Gayi	90%				Advanced
3	Shashank Shekhar	Hamari Adhuri Kahani	65%				Eliminated
4	Chetan Brijwasi	Dus Bahane	83%				Advanced
5	Raenit Singh	Jab Se Tere Naina	74%				Advanced
6	Afreen Group	Tharki Chokro	88%				Advanced
7	Hemant Brijwasi	Slow Motion Angreza	94%				Advanced

=== Rekha Special ===
The Top 10 contestants compete in this round. As the round progresses, the contestant who receives fewest votes at that point of the competition moves to the Red Sofa. At the end of the episode, the contestant who sits on the Red Sofa gets eliminated.

==== Episode 18: 24 March 2018 ====
- Guest: Rekha

Order	Contestant	Song	Votes	Experts' Choices			Result
Order	Contestant	Song	Votes	Shankar Mahadevan	Monali Thakur	Diljit Dosanjh	Result
1	Vishnumaya Ramesh	Dil Cheez Kya Hai	91%				Advanced
2	Rohanpreet Singh	Rafta Rafta	88.95%				Advanced
3	Zaid Ali	Agar Tum Na Hote	88.78%				Advanced
4	Mamta Raut	Ho Pardesia	75%				Eliminated
5	The Harmony Chorus	Kaisi Paheli Zindagani	83%				Advanced

==== Episode 19: 25 March 2018 ====
- Guest: Season One Contestants

Order	Contestant	Season 1 Contestant	Song	Votes	Experts' Choices			Result
Order	Contestant	Season 1 Contestant	Song	Votes	Shankar Mahadevan	Monali Thakur	Diljit Dosanjh	Result
1	Akhtar Brothers	Diljot Qawwali Group (8th Place)	Aaya Tere Dar Par Deewana	90%				Advanced
2	Chetan Brijwasi	Bannet Dosanjh (Winner)	Dard-e-Disco & Swag Se Swagat	88%				Advanced
3	Hemant Brijwasi	Maithili Thakur (Runner-up)	Mere Dholna	93%				Advanced
4	Raenit Singh	Ameya Date (6th Place)	Zaalima	83%				Eliminated
5	Afreen Group	Afsana Khan (7th Place)	Ghagra & Kajra Mohabbat Wala	86%				Advanced

=== Top 8 ===
The Top 8 contestants compete in this round. As the round progresses, the contestant who receives fewest votes at that point of the competition moves to the Red Sofa. At the end of the episode, the contestant who sits on the Red Sofa gets eliminated.

==== Episode 20: 31 March 2018 ====
- Guest: Udit Narayan

Order	Contestant	Song	Votes	Experts' Choices			Result
Order	Contestant	Song	Votes	Shankar Mahadevan	Monali Thakur	Diljit Dosanjh	Result
1	Rohanpreet Singh	Pehla Nasha	90%				Advanced
2	The Harmony Chorus	Gun Gun Guna + Ghanan Ghanan	75%				Eliminated
3	Chetan Brijwasi	Tatad Tatad	83%				Advanced
4	Vishnumaya Ramesh	Kuhu Kuhu Bole Koyalia	88%				Advanced
5	Akhtar Brothers	Kawa Kawa	87%				Advanced
6	Zaid Ali	Laal Ishq	89%				Advanced
7	Hemant Brijwasi	Satrangi Re	92%				Advanced
8	Afreen Group	Tu Cheej Badi Hai + Koi Jaane Koi Na Jaane	80%				Advanced

==== Episode 21: 1 April 2018 ====
Order	Contestant	Song	Votes	Experts' Choices			Result
Order	Contestant	Song	Votes	Shankar Mahadevan	Monali Thakur	Diljit Dosanjh	Result
1	Vishnumaya Ramesh	Bhare Naina	90%				Advanced
2	Chetan Brijwasi	Malhari	58%				Advanced
3	Rohanpreet Singh	Bol Na Halke Halke	92%				Advanced
4	Zaid Ali	Maula Mere Lele Meri Jaan	91%				Advanced
5	Hemant Brijwasi	Rut Aa Gayi Re	89%				Advanced
6	Akhtar Brothers	Deva Shree Ganesha	88%				Advanced
7	Afreen Group	Afreen Afreen	53%				Eliminated

=== Ticket To Finale ===
The contestants compete to earn a direct entry to the finale week. In each episode, the contestant sitting on Golden Sofa (the contestant with the highest score) will move on to compete for the Ticket To Finale.

==== Episode 22: 7 April 2018 ====
Order	Contestant	Song	Votes	Experts' Choices			Result
Order	Contestant	Song	Votes	Shankar Mahadevan	Monali Thakur	Diljit Dosanjh	Result
1	Akhtar Brothers	Shah Ka Rutba	80%				Beaten by Vishnumaya
2	Chetan Brijwasi	Suno Na Sangemarmar	71%				Couldn't beat the score of 80%
3	Vishnumaya Ramesh	Mohe Rang Do Laal	86.04%				Beaten by Zaid Ali
4	Zaid Ali	O Re Piya	86.50%				Beaten by Hemant
5	Rohanpreet Singh	Aaoge Jab Tum	84%				Couldn't beat the score of 86%
6	Hemant Brijwasi	Bheegi Bheegi	88%				Advanced to compete for the Ticket To Finale

==== Episode 23: 8 April 2018 ====
Order	Contestant	Song	Votes	Experts' Choices			Result
Order	Contestant	Song	Votes	Shankar Mahadevan	Monali Thakur	Diljit Dosanjh	Result
1	Chetan Brijwasi	Manma emotion+Aashiq surrender	75%				Beaten by Zaid Ali
2	Zaid Ali	Surili Ankhyion Wale	88.2%				Beaten by Vishnumaya Ramesh
3	Rohanpreet Singh	Jeena Jeena	84%				Couldn't beat the score of 88%
4	Vishnumaya Ramesh	Satyam Shivam Sundaram	88.51%				Advanced to compete for the Ticket To Finale
5	Akhtar Brothers	Jugni	84%				Couldn't beat the score of 88%

==== Face-off for the Ticket to Finale ====
The two top scorers of Saturday and Sunday episode participate in a face-off round.

Order	Contestant	Song	Votes	Experts' Choices			Result
Order	Contestant	Song	Votes	Shankar Mahadevan	Monali Thakur	Diljit Dosanjh	Result
1	Vishnumaya Ramesh	Sun Raha Hai Na Tu	74%				Couldn't win the ticket to finale
2	Hemant Brijwasi	Piya Re	89%				Won Ticket To Finale

=== Finale Week ===
==== Episode 24: 14 April 2018 ====
- Guest: Alia Bhatt

The Top 5 contestants except for Ticket to Finale winner Hemant Brijwasi were divided into two batches. Batch A- Zaid Ali, Chetan Brijwasi & Vishnumaya Ramesh and Batch B- Akhtar Brothers & Rohanpreet Singh. The contestant with the lowest score in each batch will be eliminated, making the Top 4.

Batch	Order	Contestant	Song	Votes	Experts' Choices			Result
Batch	Order	Contestant	Song	Votes	Shankar Mahadevan	Monali Thakur	Diljit Dosanjh	Result
A	1	Zaid Ali	Teri Deewani	88%				Advanced to Top 4
A	2	Chetan Brijwasi	Afghan Jalebi	63%				Eliminated
A	3	Vishnumaya Ramesh	Bairi Piya	88%				Advanced to Top 4
B	4	Rohanpreet Singh	Tum Hi Ho	89%				Advanced to Top 4
B	5	Akhtar Brothers	Barson Yaaron	79%				Eliminated

=== Grand Finale ===
==== Episode 25: 15 April 2018 ====
The Top 4 finalists compete in the first round. The Top 3 contestants proceed to the Face-off round.

Order	Contestant	Song	Votes	Experts' Choices			Result
Order	Contestant	Song	Votes	Shankar Mahadevan	Monali Thakur	Diljit Dosanjh	Result
1	Vishnumaya Ramesh	Hai Rama	85%				Advanced to Top 3
2	Zaid Ali	Jag Ghoomeya	80%				Third Runner-Up
3	Rohanpreet Singh	Haule Haule	83%				Advanced to Top 3
4	Hemant Brijwasi	Saanware	88%				Advanced to Top 3

Final Face-off:

Order	Contestant	Song	Votes	Result
1	Rohanpreet Singh	Khuda Jaane	78.39%	1st Runner-up
2	Vishnumaya Ramesh	Silsila Yeh Chaahat Ka	78.10%	2nd Runner-up
3	Hemant Brijwasi	Alvida	86%	Winner

Color key
Winner
1st Runner-up
2nd Runner-up
