= Shanmukha Priya =

- Born: 2 November 2002 (age 24); Visakhapatnam, Andhra Pradesh, India
- Genres: Carnatic music; Pop; Jazz; Yodeling
- Occupation: Singer
- Instrument: Vocals
- Years active: 2008–present

Shanmukha Priya (born 2 November 2002) is an Indian singer, who specializes in the carnatic music, jazz, rock, pop and yodeling. She has appeared on numerous popular reality television shows, including Padutha Theeyaga S6 (2013), Sa Re Ga Ma Pa Li'l Champs 2017 (2017) and Indian Idol 12 (2020–21).

== Early life and career ==
Shanmukha Priya was born in Visakhapatnam, India into a Telugu-speaking family. Her mother Ratnamala is a music teacher and her father Srinivas Kumar is an instrumentalist of Veena, Violin, Guitar, Mandolin and Keyboard. The Hindu reported that when she was three years old her father first heard her humming to the tune played on an alarm clock. He instantly took out the veena and gave her the notes and rhythm. She performed well with her vocals and then started her training in the carnatic music.

At the age of 6, she made her debut in the reality singing in 2008 with the TV show Sa Re Ga Ma Pa Li'l Champs 2008 on Zee Telugu. Her next show Padutha Theeyaga, which was judged by S. P. Balasubrahmanyam was her major breakthrough. Following the success on the television, she became a playback singer and recorded a song for the 2010 Telugu film Tejam.

Later, she appeared in five television singing shows, of which two are in Telugu, two are in Hindi and one in Tamil. Her performance in Indian Idol 12 made her widely popular. After watching her jazz-style performance to the song "Jaane Tu Mera Kya Hai" from the film Jaane Tu... Ya Jaane Na (2008) on the show, A. R. Rahman praised her and termed her as the next ‘Jazz Star of India’. In contrast, her yodeling-style of singing is often criticized and trolled by the audience. This criticism is mostly for her own style of singing various songs in Indian Idol 12.

She has been a meritorius student as well. She got a 9.7 GPA in her 12th Board Exams and is currently pursuing BSc in Mathematics.

== Discography ==
=== As playback singer ===
List of songs recorded
Year	Film	Song	Composer	Co-singer	Language
2010	Tejam	"Iskon Lona Krishnudikaina"	Gana	–	Telugu
2019	Ashi Hi Aashiqui	"Samjhe Kya"	Sachin Pilgaonkar	Sonu Nigam	Marathi
2021	Adavi Donga	"Atta Sudoddhoi"	Vinod Yajamanya	Vinod Yajamanya	Telugu
2022	Malli Modalaindi	"Alone Alone (female version)"	Anup Rubens	–	Telugu
2022	Grey	"The Spy Who Loved Me"	Nagaraju Talluri	–	Telugu
2022	Dharmasthali	"Kodi Katthi"	Vinod Yajamanya	Vinod Yajamanya	Telugu
2022	Liger	"Manchali"	Tanishk Bagchi	–	Telugu
2025	Ari: My Name is Nobody	"Bhaga Bhaga"	Anup Rubens	P V N S Rohit	Telugu
2026	Dashami	"Jagi Ho Ga Maay"	Suresh Pandit	–	Marathi

== Filmography ==
=== Television ===
Year	Work	Channel	Language	Notes
2008	Sa Re Ga Ma Pa Li'l Champs 2008	Zee Telugu	Telugu	
2013	Padutha Theeyaga	ETV	Telugu	
2013	Super Singer 4	MAA TV	Telugu	
2013	Super Singer Junior	Vijay TV	Tamil	
2015	Super Singer 9	Star Maa	Telugu	
2016	The Voice India Kids S1	&TV	Hindi	Eliminated in the final week
2017	Sa Re Ga Ma Pa Li'l Champs 2017	Zee TV	Hindi	
2020–21	Indian Idol 12	SET India	Hindi	5th Runner-Up
2020	The Kapil Sharma Show	SET India	Hindi	As a Guest
2021	Super Dancer	SET India	Hindi	As a Guest
2021	Sridevi Drama Company	ETV	Telugu	live performed few songs in an episode
