= Anwesha Dutta =

Indian singer

- Born: Anwesha Dutta; 14 August; Kolkata, West Bengal, India
- Genres: Indian classical music, Rabindra Sangeet, Indie-Pop,
- Occupation: Singer
- Instrument: Vocal
- Years active: 2014–present
- Label: Asha Audio

Anwesha Dutta, also known as (Anvesha and Anvesha D), is an Indian singer. She was a champion of Bengali reality show Zee Bangla Sa Re Ga Ma Pa 2014.

== Career ==
Anwesha started her career being participate in sa re ga ma pa. After being champion of this reality show she released her duet hit album "Hok Na Kotha" with Rik Basu in 2017. Anwesha released her massive hit duet song Saibaan with Rik which is crossed 1 million views on YouTube. This song is tuned and composed by Rik Basu.

== Discography ==
=== Albums ===
- Hok Na Kotha (Anwesha and Rik)
- Tomar Songe (Anwesha and Rik)

== Awards and nominations ==
- Champion of Zee Bangla Sa Re Ga Ma Pa 2014.
