= Monali Thakur =

Indian singer and actress (born 1985)

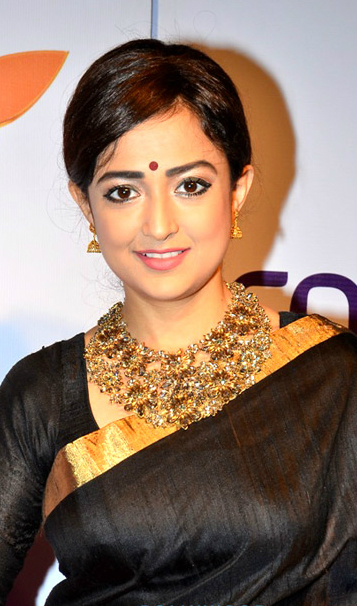
- Thakur at an event in 2014
- Pronunciation: [ˈmonali ˈʈʰakuɾ]
- Born: 3 November 1985 (age 41); Calcutta (now Kolkata), West Bengal, India
- Education: St. Xavier's College, Kolkata
- Occupations: Playback Singer; actress
- Spouse: Maik Richter (m. 2017)
- Father: Shakti Thakur
- Musical career
- Genres: Filmi; Pop; Hindustani classical; Thumri
- Years active: 2006–present
- Labels: Saregama; T-Series; Eros Music; Zee Music Company; YRF Music; Sony Music India

Monali Thakur (Bengali: [ˈmonali ˈʈʰakuɾ]; born 3 November 1985) is an Indian playback singer and film actress. She is the recipient of several awards including a National Film Award for Best Female Playback Singer for the song "Moh Moh Ke Dhaage" from the film Dum Laga Ke Haisha (2015) and a Filmfare Award for Best Female Playback Singer for the song "Sawaar Loon" from the film Lootera (2013). She was a judge of Zee TV's singing reality show Sa Re Ga Ma Pa Li'l Champs 2014. She was also an "expert" on Colors TV's Rising Star for two consecutive seasons.

== Early life ==
Thakur was born on 3 November 1985 in a Bengali musical family in Calcutta (now Kolkata). Her father Shakti Thakur was a professional singer and actor in Bengali film industry and her sister Mehuli Thakur is a playback singer in Bengal. She has learnt hip-hop and Bharatanatyam and is also a trained salsa dancer.

An alumnus of St. Xavier's College, Kolkata, Thakur started singing in school and college competitions and performing at local functions.

== Career ==
In 1999, she sang the first song of her career in the film Chena Chena under the musical direction of Anupam Dutta and penned by Pulak Bandyopadhyay. It was a Bengali children song titled "Choi Choi Choi Tipi Tipi". The same year, she recorded the title track of Bengali serial Shri Ramkrishna. She received the Best Playback Singer Award at Anandalok Awards for it when she was 14. She rose to popularity after placing ninth in Indian Idol 2.

She had to struggle even after Indian Idol to get a strong foothold in the music industry. She got an offer from music director Pritam Chakraborty to sing two songs for the Bollywood film Race in 2008 – "Khwab Dekhe" (Sexy Lady) and "Zara Zara Touch Me". Monali's first large format live concert was at Powai Sarvajanin Durgotsav in 2011.

=== Early years (2000–2012) ===
Monali started her career in 2000 with the song 'Sundar Kato Sundar' from the Bengali movie Sajoni Aamar Sohag, sung along with Kavita Krishnamurti, Goutam Ghose and Pratik Choudhary. In 2005, she participated in the singing reality show Indian Idol, She was eliminated very early and stood at 9th position. About her experience with Indian Idol, which ran for up to six months, Thakur said that she was mostly nervous the entire time. "I would get severe anxiety attacks while singing on stage and I wish I had more fun at the time". However, she opened up about the impact of participating in and winning these shows: "You win good money and it gives you face value but you can only capitalise it for no more than a couple of months. The real war starts afterwards once you start working bit by bit".

Post-Indian Idol, Thakur made her singing debut with the song "Kabool Kar Le" in the 2006 film Jaan-E-Mann, composed by Anu Malik; who was also one of the judges in Indian Idol. In 2008, Thakur rose to prominence with the songs "Zara Zara Touch Me" and "Khwab Dekhe (Sexy Lady)" in the film Race, composed by Pritam. Thakur considers the former of the songs to be her first real breakthrough. 'Zara Zara Touch Me' was originally the only song that Thakur was scheduled for, but her first recording impressed the film's directors Abbas–Mustan enough for them to book her a second song. According to her: "Ramesh ji and Kumar ji [the producers of Race] had signed me up for an album for Tips at a time independent albums had become extinct, but they liked my voice, and Pritam got me to sing for a scratch recording. Abbas-Mustan [the directors] liked it, and that is how I got the other song, Khwab Dekhe, too". "Zara Zara Touch Me" was enormously successful, becoming the fourth-most-played song on Indian radio during the first half of 2008. Joginder Tuteja of Bollywood Hungama picked it along with "Pehli Nazar Mein" as the biggest hits of the album and praised the song calling it "fresh, naughty and seductive". "Zara Zara Touch Me" became one of the year's biggest chartbusters. She also got nominated for an IIFA Award for Best Female Playback and an Apsara Award for Best Female Playback Singer for the song "Zara Zara Touch Me". That year, she collaborated with Pritam once again for the song "Meow", sung along with Suzanne D'Mello for the film Golmaal Returns. Also, she performed the title track of Ekhane Aakash Neel, which is an official Bengali remake of the Hindi series Sanjivani, which aired on StarPlus. In 2009, her first song was "Khudaya Khair" from Billu, which she sang along with Soham Chakrabarty. The song received mixed reviews from critics but Thakur was praised for her vocals. Her other songs that year included "Do Dil Hai Janwa", "Hai Junoon (Remix)" and some Bengali tracks like 2 songs, 'Prithibi Onek Boro' and 'Kalke Jilam Jajaber' in Love and 3 songs in Dujone.

In 2010, she sang the song "Dilrubaon Ke Jalwe" in the film Dulha Mil Gaya with Amit Kumar. Shot on Shah Rukh Khan and Sushmita Sen, the song met with positive reviews where Bollywood Hungama praised her diverse vocals in comparison to her previous songs. Next, she sang a solo track 'Ishq Mein' in Prince. The song was praised where critics called it upbeat and her vocals seductive. That year, she also sang 'Anjaana Anjaani Ki Kahani' from Anjaana Anjaani, composed by Vishal–Shekhar along with the whole album received huge critical acclaim. Her Bengali songs that year included releases such as 'It's Only Pyaar', 'O Yaara Ve', 'Bol Na Aar' from Dui Prithibi, 3 Tracks in Kellafate, and more.

In 2011, she sang songs like 'Naina', 'Ayo Manaye Jashn', 'Tik Tuk' from Rascals, 'Give it up' from United Six, 'Haal-e-dil' from Bbuddah... Hoga Terra Baap composed by Vishal–Shekhar, co-sung with Amitabh Bachchan. She also lend her voice to 3 songs, 'Ke Se', 'O Shona Eshona' and 'Mon Banjara' to 2011 Bengali film Fighter. That same year, she had her premier Canadian performance at the Bollywood Monster Mashup festival in Mississauga for the International Indian Film Academy Awards (IIFA).

In 2012, she sang 'Tu Mohabbat Hai' from Tere Naal Love Ho Gaya with Atif Aslam, composed by Sachin–Jigar, the song received critical acclaim. Apart from other songs that year, she sang 'Aga Bai' along with Shalmali Kholgade from the movie Aiyyaa. The song composed by Amit Trivedi was a hit and had favourable reviews where Filmfare called it a 'Fast-paced Disco Number'. About the song she said: "I was feeling incomplete at the time as I had so much to offer, So, I would complain to Amit [Trivedi], saying what was the point of doing riyaaz [practice] for 10-12 hours if I cannot use it. Then, he asked me to sing a thumri in Aga Bai, parts of which had already been sung by Shalmali Kholgade". Among others, She also Sang a Bengali Track 'Shadow Tales' in the film Aparajita Tumi. Composed by Shantanu Moitra, the song was appreciated by critics.

=== "Sawaar Loon" and Bollywood film debut as an actress (2013-2014) ===
In 2013, Thakur sang "Sawaar Loon", composed by Amit Trivedi from the film Lootera. The song met with highly positive reviews, Filmfare wrote, "Monali Thakur instills sugar in our ears, the '50s orchestration, coupled with the perfect pitch of the singer manages to take you back to a bygone era", while Mohar Basu of Koimoi wrote, "A romantic ballad out of the 50s, the song sung by Monali Thakur is astonishingly wonderful. Thakur's heart melting voice is gripping and Amit Trivedi's tunes and Amitabh Bhattacharya's heart wrenching lyrics skillfully weaves a wonderful tapestry of music that we can call sheer finesse. The playful drift of Thakur's voice, is abundant in naivety making the song soulfully innocent". The song won her first Filmfare Award for Best Female Playback Singer.

Her next releases that year were 'Hip Hop Pammi' from Ramaiya Vastavaiya sung with Mika Singh, 'Muh Meetha Kara De' from Rabba Main Kya Karoon, 'Laila' from Nasha. Also, she sang the title track of I Don't Luv U along with Neuman Pinto, the singer's voice was praised, though the song was not. 'Raghupati Raghav' from Krrish 3 was her next release, co-sung with Neeraj Shridhar and composed by Rajesh Roshan, the song received praise where singers were applauded for their energetic vocals. Her The following releases that year were 2 tracks from the movie I, Me Aur Main, 'Darbadar' in which she collaborated again with Sachin–Jigar and 'Meri Jaaniye' performed alongside Shaan. while the former, a classical touch song, the latter is a romantic number with a western touch. Both of them were well appreciated by critics where, Suparna Thombare of 'Bollywood Life' stated about 'Darbadar' that "The ektara, clap sounds and Monali Thakur's silken voice lead you into this Sufi number that slowly zooms into a high energy song. Monali gets the chance to sing a semi-classical number for the first time and she truly shines, Joginder Tuteja of Bollywood Hungama stated about 'Meri Jaaniye' "It is good to see Monali wear a different hat for this one and step into a Western avtar". She performed a female solo 'Laila' in Nasha, composed by musical duo Sangeet-Siddharth, the song was well received and called a sweet one. That year also, she sang some Bengali tracks.

In 2014, Thakur made her film debut with Lakshmi dealing with the harsh realities of human trafficking and child prostitution, which continues behind closed curtains in rural areas of India. Directed by Nagesh Kukunoor, the film did not perform well and received mixed reviews by critics but Thakur's performance was praised. She won Best Actress Award at the South-Asian International Film Festival in Washington DC, making her the first Bollywood singer to have won. That year, she also Collaborated with Bappi Lahiri for the Bangla version of the song 'Tune Mari Entriyan' from the film Gunday. The song was a chartbuster in both Hindi and Bangla. Mitesh Saraf of 'Planet Bollywood' appreciated the song "Bappi Lahiri and Monali Thakur takes centre stage and both does really well in maintaining the entertainment quotient" while, Rediff.com stated "Monali Thakur goes all out to make the best use of the platform provided to her. A chartbuster all the way". She provided English Vocals in the song 'Love Me Thoda Aur' sung by Arijit Singh for the film Yaariyan. During the year, she voiced for some other songs, 'Sweety' from Bobby Jasoos performed alongside Aishwarya Nigam and composed by Shantanu Moitra, the song received mixed reviews, the Title Track of Karle Pyaar Karle co-sung with Benny Dayal, the reviews for the songs were fair.

She was a judge in the Bengali music reality show Bengali Sa Re Ga Ma Pa Li'l Champs for two years. She also appeared in the Bengali show Key Hobe Biggest Fan and was part of Coke Studio.

=== 'Moh Moh Ke Dhaage' and further hits (2015–present) ===
She began the new year with a song 'Turram Khan' in Hawaizaada, co-sung by Papon and Ayushmann Khurrana. 'Karthik' of Milliblog stated, "superbly led by Papon, till Ayushmann Khurrana and Monali Thakur interject later in the song with a lively melodic distraction". After it, she sang 3 Bengali songs of which 2, 'Ure Geche' and 'Tumi Aashe Paashe' composed by Indraadip Dasgupta from the film Parbona Ami Chartey Tokey, 1 song 'Kono Ek Nilchee Pari' from Black.

This year turned out to be again very successful for her when she sang a semi-classical melody, 'Moh Moh Ke Dhaage', from the film Dum Laga Ke Haisha starring Ayushmann Khurrana, Bhumi Pednekar and Composed by Anu Malik. A separate male version of the song is sung by Papon. According to her, "It doesn't happen often that in the world of EDMs and Hiphop Bollywood numbers one gets a chance to sing evergreen rich Indian melody, hence I can't thank Anu Ji enough to trust me as a singer with this beautiful song "Moh Moh Ke Dhaage", thus keeping a promise he made years back to me in a reality show where I was just a contestant". The Song became a Chartbuster and was Highly appreciated by Audience as well as Critics. Prateek Sur of 'Bollywood Life' commented, "Monali impresses with her melodic vocals". The song won her several awards including National Film Award for Best Female Playback Singer at the 63rd National Film Awards, IIFA Award for Best Female Playback Singer at 17th IIFA Awards. Also, she was nominated for Filmfare Award for Best Female Playback Singer for the same. The composer Anu Malik as well as lyricist of the song Varun Grover won several awards. Varun won National Film Award for Best Lyrics for it. As of 2021, the lyrical video of the song has garnered more than 130 Million views on YouTube. On winning prestigious National Award, Thakur says, "This gives a lot of happiness when you know that you have won an award or for that matter that you have been nominated for your work. I realised the actual gravity of this award when I saw the reactions of family and friends".

In 2018, Thakur appeared in the Zee5 show Lockdown along with Mickey Singh which was produced by Badshah's production house Afterhours. They recreated two tracks, "Jiya Jale" and "Gur Nalon Ishq Meetha". Apart from these Monali has also sung several super-hits like "Cham Cham" song from 2016 film Baaghi, which has garnered more than 1 Billion views on YouTube as of January 2022 and The Title Track of 2018 film "Badrinath Ki Dulhania", which she sang along with Neha Kakkar, Dev Negi and Ikka Singh, has been watched more than 800 Million times on Youtube as of January 2022. Thakur has also released her singles, "Tamanna" (2018), "Shy Mora Saiyaan" (2018), "O Re Naseeba" (2019), "Pani Pani Re" (2019), "Dugga Elo" (2019) and her latest Single is "Dil Ka Fitoor" (2020). In 2020 Thakur has sung 2 more singles: "Aaina" along with Ranajoy Bhattacharjee and "Elo Maa Dugga Thakur" along with Sonu Nigam.

== Acting career ==
As a child, she appeared in a Bengali television show, Aalokito ek Indu, in which she played the lead role Indubala. It was followed by two telefilms, including Sudeshna Roy's Phagune Agun, in which she was seen as Ruman. She made her acting debut in Raja Sen's Bengali film Krishnakanter Will, in which she played Bhromor. In 2014, she made her Bollywood debut in Nagesh Kukunoor's Lakshmi. The film is about human trafficking and child prostitution and Thakur plays a 15-year-old girl who gets trapped in it. She was seen in a guest appearance as a Kashmiri Girl in 2014 film PK. Thakur has also a played a cameo role in film Secret Superstar released in 2017. She will be seen in Abbas Tyrewala's multistarrer Mango. She also acted in a short film titled Jangle Bells along with Namit Das. The film came out on Christmas of 2015.

== Personal life ==
Thakur married Maik Richter, a restaurateur based in Switzerland, in 2017. She met Richter during a backpacking trip to Switzerland – he was her Airbnb host. Thakur made the marriage public only in June 2020 after releasing her single "Dil Ka Fitoor", which features her along with Maik.

== Discography ==
Monali Thakur discography
- Hindi songs: 71
- Non-film songs: 26
- Non-Hindi film songs: 50
- Total: 147

Thakur has sung numerous songs of different languages including Hindi, Bengali, Tamil, and Kannada.

== Filmography ==
†	Denotes films that have not yet been released

=== Film ===
Year	Film	Role	Language	Note	Ref.
2007	Krishnakanter Will	Bhramar	Bengali		
2014	Lakshmi	Lakshmi	Hindi		
2014	PK	Kashmiri girl	Hindi	Cameo	
2015	Debi	Lali	Bengali	Short film	
2015	Jangle Bells	Mitali	Hindi	Short film	
2017	Secret Superstar	Herself	Hindi	Cameo	
2024	Dukaan	Diya	Hindi		

=== Television ===
Year	Title	Role	Notes
2004	Alokito Ek Indu	Indubala	Bengali serial; lead role
2006	Indian Idol Season 2	Contestant	9th place Sony TV
2006	Phagune Agun	Ruman	Bengali television film
2009–2011	Sa Re Ga Ma Pa Bangla	Judge	With Sadhna Sargam, Shantanu Moitra, Babul Supriyo, Kumar Sanu, Haimanti Sukla Zee Bangla
2010	Ke Hobe Biggest Fan	Guest	With Anurag Basu Zee Bangla
2014	Bollywood Business	Herself	Interview; Zee ETC Bollywood
2014	Sa Re Ga Ma Pa Li'l Champs 2014	Judge	With Shaan, Alka Yagnik Zee Tv
2014	Sa Re Ga Ma Pa Bangla	Guest	With Kumar Sanu, Alka Yagnik, Hariharan Zee Bangla
2015	Sa Re Ga Ma Pa L'il Champs Grand Finale North America	Judge	With Ali Zafar Zee TV USA
2016	Sa Re Ga Ma Pa Sangeet er Sera Mancha	Judge	With Shantanu Moitra, Shubha Mudgal Zee Bangla
2016	Comedy Nights Live	Guest	Colors TV
2017	The Drama Company	Guest	Sony TV
2017	Rising Star	Judge & Expert	With Shankar Mahadevan, Diljit Dosanjh Colors TV
2017	The Stage	Guest	With Vishal Dadlani, Monica Dogra, Ehsaan Noorani Colors Infinity
2018	MTV Unplugged	Herself	MTV 5 Songs
2018	Musically Yours - Exclusive Interview	Herself	Bollywood Hungama
2018	Entertainment Ki Raat	Guest	With Shankar Mahadevan Colors TV
2018	Rising Star India (Season 2)	Judge & Expert	With Shankar Mahadevan, Diljit Dosanjh Colors TV
2018	Entertainment Ki Raat (Season 2)	Guest	with Udit Narayan Colors TV
2018	Sa Re Ga Ma Pa Sangeet er Sera Mancha	Judge	With Shantanu Moitra, Srikanto Acharya Zee Bangla
2018	Comedy Circus	Guest	Sony TV
2019	Gata Rahe Mera Dil	Guest	Tez
2019	Amazon Great Festival Live	Herself	Sony Music 4 Songs (Iktara, Desi Girl, Sajda, Mitwa)
2019	MTV Youth	Judge	MTV
2023	Super Singer Season 4	Judge	Star Jalsa

== Awards and nominations ==
Year	Category	Song and film	Result
National Film Awards
2015	Best Female Playback Singer	"Moh Moh Ke Dhaage" (Dum Laga Ke Haisha)	Won
Filmfare Awards
2014	Best Female Playback Singer	"Sawar Loon" (Lootera)	Won
2016	Best Female Playback Singer	"Moh Moh Ke Dhaage" (Dum Laga Ke Haisha)	Nominated
2018	Best Female Playback Singer	"Khol De Baahein" (Meri Pyaari Bindu)	Nominated
Screen Awards
2014	Best Female Playback Singer	"Sawar Loon" (Lootera)	Nominated
2016	Best Female Playback Singer	"Moh Moh Ke Dhaage" (Dum Laga Ke Haisha)	Won
International Indian Film Academy Awards
2009	Best Female Playback Singer	"Zara Zara Touch Me" (Race)	Nominated
2014	Best Female Playback Singer	"Sawar Loon" (Lootera)	Nominated
2016	Best Female Playback Singer	"Moh Moh Ke Dhaage" (Dum Laga Ke Haisha)	Won
Zee Cine Awards
2014	Best Playback Singer – Female	"Sawar Loon" (Lootera)	Nominated
2016	Best Female Playback Singer	"Moh Moh Ke Dhaage" (Dum Laga Ke Haisha)	Nominated
Times of India Film Awards
2016	Best Playback Singer – Female	"Moh Moh Ke Dhaage" (Dum Laga Ke Haisha)	Nominated
Global Indian Music Academy Awards
2014	Best Female Playback Singer	"Sawar Loon" (Lootera)	Nominated
2016	Best Female Playback Singer	"Moh Moh Ke Dhaage" (Dum Laga Ke Haisha)	Nominated
Mirchi Music Awards
2011	Upcoming Female Vocalist	"Aga bai"(Aiyaa)	Nominated
2013	Best Playback Singer -Female	"Sawar Loon" (Lootera)	Nominated
2015	Best Playback Singer – Female	"Moh Moh Ke Dhaage" (Dum Laga Ke Haisha)	Nominated
2017	Best Playback Singer – Female	"Badri Ki Dulhania" (Badrinath Ki Dulhania)	Nominated
Star Guild Awards
2009	Best Female Playback Singer	"Zara Zara Touch Me" (Race)	Nominated
2014	Best Playback Singer – Female	"Sawar Loon" (Lootera)	Nominated
2016	Best Female Playback Singer	"Moh Moh Ke Dhaage" (Dum Laga Ke Haisha)	Won
BIG Star Entertainment Awards
2013	Best Entertaining Singer Female	"Sawar loon" (Lootera)	Nominated
Stardust Awards
2016	Best Female Playback Singer	"Moh Moh Ke Dhaage" (Dum Laga Ke Haisha)	Nominated
Sony Mix Audience Music Awards
2018	Best Female Playback Singer	"Khol De Baahein" (Meri Pyaari Bindu)	Nominated

== See also ==
- List of Indian playback singers
