= Gourab Sarkar =

Indian Singer

- গৌরব সরকার
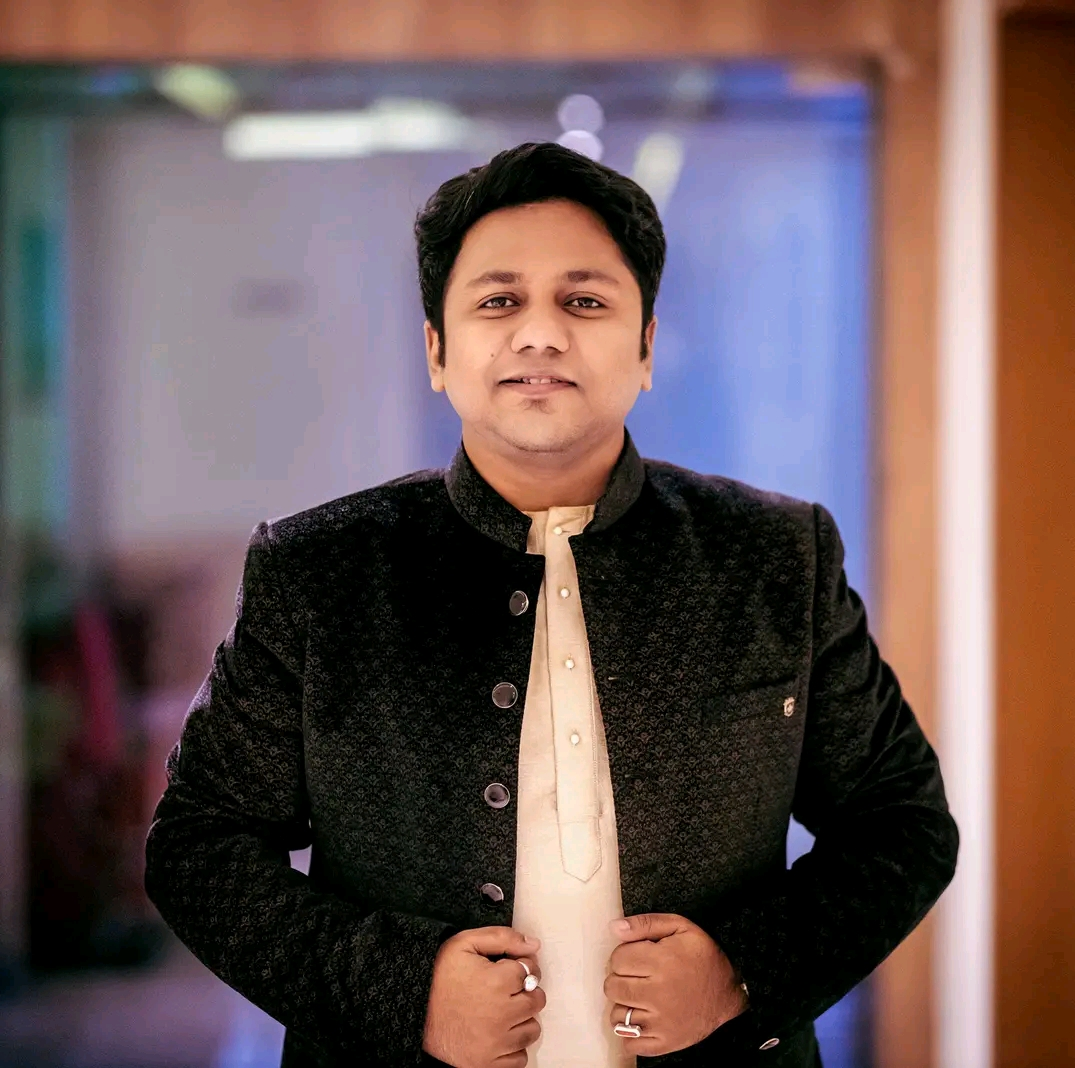
- Gourab Sarkar in 2022
- Born: Kolkata, West Bengal, India
- Occupations: Singer; Songwriter; Live performer
- Years active: 2019–present
- Musical career
- Genres: World; Indian Classical; Filmi
- Instruments: Vocals, Harmonium, Guitar

Gourab Sarkar is an Indian singer. He has participated Sa Re Ga Ma Pa, a singing reality show which airs on Zee Bangla and became the 1st runner-up of Sa Re Ga Ma Pa 2019. He has sung many songs like Rakhbo Tomay Jotne Ami, Megh, Bijoyer Gaan, Eso Bondhu, Elo Maa Dugga, Manche Pherar Gaan, Algoche and many more.

== Songs ==
- Rakhbo Tomay Jotne Ami
- Megh
- Bijoyer Gaan
- Eso Bondhu
- Elo Maa Dugga
- Namuk Brishti
- Manche pherar Gaan
- Aalgoche
- Mon Banjare Re
