= Sa Re Ga Ma Pa Li'l Champs 2014 =

- Season 2014
- Starring: see below

Release
- Original network: Zee TV
- Original release: 27 December 2014 – 21 March 2015

Season chronology
- ← Previous; 2011 Next → 2017

Sa Re Ga Ma Pa L'il Champs 2014 was the fifth season of Sa Re Ga Ma Pa L'il Champs, a singing competition television series, which premiered on 27 December 2014 on Zee TV. The series aired on every Saturday and Sunday nights for one hour. The grand finale was held on 21 March 2015 for three hours, and the winner was Gagan Gaonkar.

Alka Yagnik was the Mahaguru in this season, while the judges’ chairs were occupied by leading singers Shaan and Monali Thakur. Shaan was the captain of the boys’ team and Monali was the captain of the girls’ team. Aditya Narayan was the host of the season.

The fifth season opened with an opening of 4776 TVTs, which is the highest amongst singing reality shows.

Host

Aditya Narayan

Captains

Shaan

Monali Thakur

Maha Guru

Alka Yagnik

Top 12 Contestants

Gagan Gaonkar - Winner

Keshav Tyohar - 1st Runner Up

Aishwarya Saha - 2nd Runner Up

Arunita Kanjilal - 3rd Runner up

Ridham Kalyan - 4th Runner up

Antara Sarkar - Eliminated

Isis Paul - Eliminated

Sneha Shankar - Eliminated

Varenyam Pandya - Eliminated

Aravind Nair - Eliminated

Ishita Vishwakarma - Eliminated

Prabhupada Mohanty - Eliminated
