= Sa Re Ga Ma Pa Hindi 2012 =

- Created by: Neeraj Sharma
- Directed by: T.V. Vinod
- Presented by: Javed Ali
- Country of origin: India
- Original language: Hindi

Production
- Camera setup: Multi-camera
- Running time: 90 minutes

Original release
- Network: Zee TV
- Release: 29 September 2012 – 27 January 2013

Related
- Sa Re Ga Ma Pa Li'l Champs 2011

Hero - Sa Re Ga Ma Pa 2012 is the fifth installment of the Sa Re Ga Ma Pa Challenge series. It premiered on 29 September 2012 on Zee TV. The show was hosted by singer Javed Ali.

== Overview ==
Over 1,20,000 auditions were conducted in New Delhi, Mumbai and Kolkata to select 100 contestants. Out of these, the top fifteen then competed for a position in the top ten for five weeks, two contestants being eliminated each week for three weeks, and one each for weeks 4 and 5. In the fifth week, three of the eliminated contestants won back their positions in the top ten by defeating three other contenders, to make up the final list of top ten.

The top ten then went on to compete in a contest to be decided by viewers through voting. This segment witnessed one elimination every week, until four contestants were left. The winner amongst them was announced in a Grand Finale episode. The contest was won by Jasraj Joshi, with the second, third and fourth places going to Shehnaz Akhtar, Vishwajeet Borwankar and Mohammed Aman respectively.

== Hosts ==
- Javed Ali
- Jay Bhanushali (Audition episodes)

== Judges and Mentors ==
- Rahul Ram
- Shankar Mahadevan
- Sajid–Wajid

=== Guest Judges ===
- Prasoon Joshi (Week 11)
- Ajay–Atul (Week 11)
- Ustad Ghulam Ali (Week 7)
- Taufiq Qureshi (Week 6)
- Pandit Vishwa Mohan Bhatt (Week 5)
- Hariharan (Week 4)
- Gurdas Maan (Week 3)
- Begum Parveen Sultana (Week 2)
- Pandit Jasraj (Week 1)

== Contestants ==
=== Finalists ===
- Jasraj Joshi (Pune) - Winner
- Shehnaz Akhtar (Punjab) - Second place
- Vishwajeet Borwankar (Mumbai) - Third place
- Mohammed Aman (Rajasthan) - Fourth place

(Eliminated in Week 3; successful attempt during wild-card entry episode)

=== Eliminated ===
- Jaspreet 'Jazim' Sharma - in Week 13
- Renu Nagar - in Week 11
- Arshpreet Kaur - in Week 10 (previously eliminated in Week 4; successful attempt during wild-card entry episode)
- Madhuri Dey - in Week 9
- Himanshu Sharma - in Week 8 (previously eliminated in Mega Audition; successful attempt during wild-card entry episode)
- Zain Ali - in Week 7 (beginning of public voting)
- Barbie Rajput - in Mega Audition (unsuccessful attempt during wild-card entry episode)
- Padmanav Bordoloi - in Week 5 (unsuccessful attempt during wild-card entry episode)
- Kunal Pandit - in Week 3 (unsuccessful attempt during wild-card entry episode)
- Mrunmayee Tirodkar - in Week 2
- Subhrima Bhadury - in Week 2
- Parul Mishra - in Week 1
- Arsh Mohammed - in Week 1
