= Sa Re Ga Ma Pa Li'l Champs 2011 =

- Season 2011
- Starring: see below

Release
- Original network: Zee TV
- Original release: 3 June 2011

Season chronology
- ← Previous; 2009 Next → 2014

Sa Re Ga Ma Pa L'il Champs 2011 was the fifth season of the popular Indian Zee TV show Sa Re Ga Ma Pa L'il Champs. Broadcast from 3 June 2011, the music reality show had 18 participants: 9 boys and 9 girls. The theme for season 5 was Music Ka Gurukul. The show was won by Azmat Hussain, who later became a contestant on season 11 of Indian Idol. The runner-up was Salman Ali who later on became the winner of season 10 of Indian Idol.

== Host ==
- Jay Soni

== Teams ==
The candidates were divided into three teams, each guided by one of the judges. Zee Saregama Grand finale Live Telecast from Surat Event management by Atul Patel and Ashvin Borad, Modern Moviee Pvt Ltd -Surat work under the Reliance Production, Mumbai. Guest Shahrukh khan -Film Promotion -Ra One

=== Adnan ke Anokhe ===
Guru: Adnan Sami

- Barnali Hota (11, Bhubaneswar, Orissa) - eliminated 2 September
- Emil Roy (12, Nagpur, Maharashtra) - eliminated 25 June
- Niladri Chatterjee (10, Kolkata, West Bengal) - eliminated 23 September
- Sargamkant Vaish (11, Allahabad, Uttar Pradesh) - eliminated 2 July
- Simran Kaur (13, Haryana) - eliminated 25 June
- Srashti Singh(11, Haryana) - eliminated on 16 July

=== Kailash ke Avdhoo ===
Guru: Kailash Kher

- Anmol Khatri (11, Allahabad, Uttar Pradesh) - eliminated 26 August
- Pooja Tiwari (11, Lucknow, Uttar Pradesh) - eliminated 18 June
- Prajwal Shirke (10, Gwalior, Madhya Pradesh) - eliminated 18 June
- Rima Chakraborty (13, Berhampore, Murshidabad, West Bengal) - eliminated 9 July
- Salman Ali (13, Punahana, Mewat, Haryana) - grand finale contestant: second place
- Sanjana Bhola ... (12, Ludhiana, Punjab) - eliminated 19 August

=== Javed ke Abhiru ===
Guru: Javed Ali

- Azmat Hussain (10, Jaipur, Rajasthan) - eliminated 9 July, came back as wild card entry on 22 July and was crowned winner in the grand finale
- Krishnendu Adhikary (12, Shantipur, Nadia, West Bengal) - eliminated 16 July
- Nitin Kumar (14, Mubarikpur) - saved from elimination 9 September and 3rd place in grand finale
- Priyanshi Srivastava (9, Lucknow, Uttar Pradesh) - eliminated 2 July wildcard entry on 22 July and got eliminated again on 5 August
- Rimsha Deb (10, Dharmanagar, Tripura) - eliminated 16 September
- Veda Nerurkar (13, Mumbai, Maharashtra) - eliminated on 30 July

After the children were put into the three groups, the three judges put two contestants in the challenge round from their groups (1 boy and 1 girl). After that the one boy and one girl from each group sang and Alka Yagnik choose the two eliminated contestants out of the six total,

Week 1 Challenge round contestants: Top 18

Rimsa, Azmat, Emil, Shristy, Pooja, Prajwal (eliminated contestants: Prajwal and Pooja)

Week 2 Challenge round contestants: Top 16

Krishnendu, Emil, Simran, Veda, Reema, Salman (eliminated contestants: Emil and Simran)

Week 3 Challenge round contestants: Top 14

Sargam, Priyanshi, Krishnendu, Shristy, Salman, Sanjana (eliminated contestants: Sargam and Priyanshi)

Week 4 Challenge round contestants: Top 12

Azmat, Veda, Nirladri, Bernali, Salman, Reema (eliminated contestants: Reema and Azmat)

Week 5 Challenge round contestants: Top 10

Veda, Krishnendu, Nirladri, Shristy, Anmol, Sanjana (eliminated contestants: Krishnendu and Sristy)

The top eight and two wildcard contestants, Azmat and Priyanshi, formed the Dabanng dus. The voting system was used afterwards for selecting the finalist among Dabanng dus.

=== Top 10: Dabanng dus ===
- Barnali Hota - eliminated 2 September
- Niladri Chatterjee - eliminated 23 September
- Anmol Khatri - eliminated 26 August
- Salman Ali
- Sanjana Bhola - eliminated 19 August
- Priyanshi Srivastava - eliminated 5 August
- Rimsha Deb - eliminated 16 September
- Nitin Kumar
- Veda Nerurkar - eliminated 29 July
- Azmat Hussain

Top 10

- Bottom 3: Niladri, Veda, Priyanshi
- Bottom 2: Niladri, Veda
- Eliminated: Veda

Top 9

- Bottom 3: Anmol, Sanjana, Priyanshi
- Bottom 2: Sanjana, Priyanshi
- Eliminated: Priyanshi

Top 8

- Bottom 3: Nitin, Niladri, Sanjana
- Bottom 2: Niladri, Sanjana
- Eliminated: Sanjana

Top 7

- Bottom 2: Anmol, Niladri.
- Eliminated: Anmol

Top 6

- Bottom 2: Barnali, Nitin
- Eliminated: Barnali

Top 5

- Bottom 2: Nitin, Niladri
- Eliminated: Nitin (saved by Alka Yagnik's trump card)

Top 5

- Bottom 2: Niladri, Rimsha
- Eliminated: Rimsha

Top 4

- Bottom 2: Nitin, Niladri
- Eliminated: Niladri

Top 3

- Second runner up : Nitin Kumar
- First runner up: Salman Ali
- Winner: Azmat Hussain
