= Hemant Brijwasi =

Indian singer

Hemant Brijwasi (born 1997 or 1998), nicknamed 'Hemu', is an Indian singer. In 2009, he won the television contest for Sa Re Ga Ma Pa Li'l Champs. In 2018, he won the television contest Rising Star 2. He has performed as a playback singer for films Soorma (2018) and Manikarnika: The Queen of Jhansi (2019). He has connoisseur of music and a talented singer Lokmat Sur Jyotsna National Music Award 2018 in the hand of Maharashtra Chief Minister Shri Devendra Fadnavis.
