= Javed Ali =

Indian playback singer

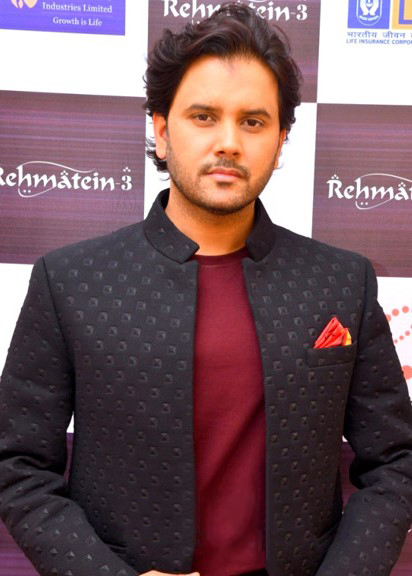
- Javed at a musical concert in 2017

Background information
- Born: Javed Hussain; Delhi, India
- Genres: Playback; Romantic/Sufi etc
- Occupations: Singer; television presenter
- Years active: 2000–present
- Labels: Sony Music India; Zee Music Company; T-Series
- Website: youtube.com/@javedali

Javed Ali is an Indian playback singer who predominantly sings in Hindi. He has also sung in various Indian languages including Bengali, Kannada, Malayalam, Gujarati, Marathi, Odia, Tamil, Telugu and Urdu.

== Early life ==
Javed Ali was born as Javed Hussain in Panchkuian Road, Delhi. He studied in Ramjas School 4, Paharganj. Javed Ali started singing at a very early age with his father Ustad Hamid Hussain, a popular qawwali singer. Ghazal singer Ghulam Ali heard Ali's voice and felt that he could become a great singer in future. Ghulam Ali not only guided Javed, but also gave him chance to sing in his live concerts. As a tribute and honour to his guru Ghulam Ali, Javed changed his name from Javed Hussain to Javed Ali.

== Career ==
In 2007, Javed Ali came into limelight for his song "Ek Din Teri Raahon Mein" from the film Naqaab and thereafter he sang "Jashn-e-Bahaara" from Jodhaa Akbar, "Arziyan" from Delhi-6, "Kun Faya Kun" from Rockstar, "Guzarish" from Ghajini, "Aa Jao Meri Tamanna" from Ajab Prem Ki Ghazab Kahani, "Gale Lag Ja" from De Dana Dan, "Tu Hi Haqeeqat" from Tum Mile, "Tum Tak" from Raanjhanaa, Jab Tak Hai Jaan title track from the film Jab Tak Hai Jaan, "Deewana Kar Raha Hai" from Raaz 3, "Ishaqzaade" title track from the film Ishaqzaade, "Galat Baat Hai" from Main Tera Hero, Daawat-e-Ishq film's title track, "Maula" from Wazir, "Nagada Nagada" from Jab We Met, "Tu Jo Mila" from Bajrangi Bhaijaan, "Saanson Ke" from Raees, "Kuch Nahi" from Tubelight, and "Naina Lade" from Dabangg 3.

He has done playback singing in various regional Indian languages like Bengali, Kannada, Malayalam, Marathi, Odia, Tamil, Telugu and Urdu. He judged reality shows like Sa Re Ga Ma Pa Li'l Champs 2011 on Zee TV, Great Music Gurukul 2015 on Colors Bangla, Sa Re Ga Ma Pa Li'l Champs 2017 on Zee TV and Indian Idol Season 10 in 2018 on Sony Entertainment Television. Javed Ali also hosted Zee TV's singing reality show Sa Re Ga Ma Pa Hindi 2012. He was one of the three judges on Super star singer (in 2022 and 2023).

== Discography ==
He has also sung many devotional songs with popular singers like Debashish, Preeti, Pinky, Charanjeet Singh Sondhi, Soham Chakraborty, Kalpana, Priya Bhattacharya etc. In 2018 he sang for Manju Warrier-starrer Malayalam film Aami. The song 'Chand Hoga' was written by Gulzar and music by Taufiq Qureshi. The film is a biopic on Indian English writer Kamala Das.

Recently Javed Ali worked on his single's Music Video 'Rangreziya'. He sang as well as composed the song for this Video.

== Television career ==
- Mentored the singing reality show Sa Re Ga Ma Pa Li'l Champs 2011 on Zee TV.
- Hosted Zee TV's Singing Reality Show Sa Re Ga Ma Pa Hindi 2012.
- Mentored Bengali Singing Reality Show on Colors Bangla named Great Music Gurukul in 2015.
- One of the Judges of Zee TV's Singing Reality Show Sa Re Ga Ma Pa Li'l Champs 2017
- One of the Judges of Indian Idol Season 10 (Replacement of Anu Malik)
- One of the judge of Superstar Singer
- One of the judge of Sa Re Ga Ma Pa Li'l Champs 2020 (Replacement of Udit Narayan and Kumar Sanu with Himesh Reshammiya
- One of the Contestant of Colors TV's Controversial Reality Show Bigg Boss 16
- One of the judge of Zee Bangla's Singing Reality show Sa Re Ga Ma Pa Bangla 2024

== Awards and nominations ==
=== Awards won ===
- IIFA Awards 2009 in The Best Male Playback Singer category for the song Jashn-E-Bahara from the film Jodhaa Akbar.
- 19th Screen Awards 2012 in The Best Playback Singer Category for the Title Track of the film named Ishaqzaade.
- Won Radio Mirchi's Mirchi Music Awards (4 Awards) in 2012 in the following categories: Best Song Representing the Sufi Tradition – Kun Faya Kun from the film Rockstar, Best Indipop Song "Mera Kya Saheb Haitera" from "Dil Ki Baatein", Best Album of the year and Mirchi listener Award for Rockstar.
- Uttar Pradesh Government honoured Javed Ali with the state's prestigious award, Yash Bharti Samman.
- India TV awarded Javed Ali with the Yuwa Award 2015.

=== Nominated for awards ===
- Filmfare Awards (2010) for The Best Male Playback Singer category for the song Arziyan from the film Delhi-6.
- 63rd Filmfare Awards South (2016) for The Best Male Playback Singer category for the song Sanje Veleli from the film Luv U Alia.
- Zee Cine Awards (2013) for The Best Male Playback Singer category for the song Ishaqzaade from the film Ishaqzaade.
- South Indian International Movie Awards (2022) for Best Male Playback Singer (Telugu) category for the song Nee Kannu Neeli Samudram from the film Uppena.

== Live performances ==
Javed Ali performs live with his band all over the world. In July–August 2016, Javed Ali performed in 9 cities of the United States of America. He also regularly performs in maestro A.R Rahman's worldwide live concert tours. On 15 August 2016 Javed Ali performed in the Headquarters of the United Nations with A.R Rahman to celebrate India's 70th Independence Day.

In 2016 Javed Ali performed in Mumbai at a fundraiser event for war widows.

He performed for a fund raiser for an old age home at Satpala, Virar in Palghar, Maharashtra on 10 November 2018.
