= List of awards and nominations received by Alka Yagnik =

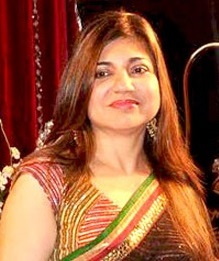
Yagnik at 11th Indian Television Academy Awards in 2011

Alka Yagnik (born 20 March 1966 in Kolkata, West Bengal, India) is an Indian singer who is ranked among the best Hindi playback singers of all time. She is a seven-time winner of the Filmfare Award for Best Female Playback Singer, a record tied with Asha Bhosle, and has done playback singing for over 1000 Indian films. She has sung more than 20,000 songs in various Indian languages.

== Awards won for Best Female Playback Singer ==
Alka Yagnik has received numerous awards and nominations in her singing career, in addition to the awards listed below. She received the Filmfare award for Best Female Playback for three consecutive years from 2000 to 2002.

=== Filmfare Awards ===
Year	Song	Film	Music director(s)	Lyrics
1989	"Ek Do Teen"	Tezaab	Laxmikant–Pyarelal	Javed Akhtar
1994	"Choli Ke Peeche" shared with Ila Arun	Khalnayak	Laxmikant-Pyarelal	Anand Bakshi
1998	"Meri Mehbooba"	Pardes	Nadeem-Shravan	Anand Bakshi
2000	"Taal Se Taal"	Taal	A.R. Rahman	Anand Bakshi
2001	"Dil Ne Yeh Kaha Hai Dil Se"	Dhadkan	Nadeem-Shravan	Sameer
2002	"O Re Chhori"	Lagaan	A.R. Rahman	Javed Akhtar
2005	"Hum Tum"	Hum Tum	Jatin–Lalit	Prasoon Joshi

=== National Film Awards ===
Year	Song	Film	Music director(s)	Lyricist
1993	"Ghoongat Ki Aad Se"	Hum Hain Rahi Pyar Ke	Nadeem-Shravan	Sameer
1998	"Kuch Kuch Hota Hai"	Kuch Kuch Hota Hai	Jatin–Lalit	Sameer

=== Lata Mangeshkar Award ===
2013- Outstanding Contribution to Indian Music

=== Bollywood Movie Awards ===
Year	Song	Film	Music director(s)	Lyricist
1999	"Kuch Kuch Hota Hai"	Kuch Kuch Hota Hai	Jatin–Lalit	Sameer
2001	"Kaho Naa... Pyaar Hai"	Kaho Naa... Pyaar Hai	Rajesh Roshan	Ibraheem Ashk
2002	"San San Sana"	Ashoka	Anu Malik	Gulzar
2007	"Tumhi Dekho Naa"	Kabhi Alvida Naa Kehna	Shankar–Ehsaan–Loy	Javed Akhtar

=== Global Indian Film Awards ===
Year	Song	Film	Music director(s)	Lyricist
2007	"Kabhi Alvida Naa Kehna"	Kabhi Alvida Naa Kehna	Shankar–Ehsaan–Loy	Javed Akhtar

=== Zee Cine Awards ===
Year	Song	Film	Music director(s)	Lyricist
1999	"Kuch Kuch Hota Hai"	Kuch Kuch Hota Hai	Jatin–Lalit	Sameer
2001	"Kaho Naa... Pyaar Hai"	Kaho Naa... Pyaar Hai	Rajesh Roshan	Ibraheem Ashk
2007	"Tumhi Dekho Naa"	Kabhi Alvida Naa Kehna	Shankar–Ehsaan–Loy	Javed Akhtar
2020	"Zee Cine Special Achievers Award"			

=== Screen Awards ===
Year	Song	Film	Music director(s)	Lyricist
1996	"Dil Ne Dil Se Ikraar Kiya"	Haqeeqat	Dilip Sen-Sameer Sen	Sameer
2001	"Panchi Nadiyan"	Refugee	Anu Malik	Javed Akhtar
2002	Special Award for "Kitni Bechain Hoke"	Kasoor	Nadeem-Shravan	Sameer
2005	"Special Award for Outstanding Contribution to Indian Music since 25 years"			

=== International Indian Film Academy Awards ===
Year	Song	Film	Music director(s)	Lyricist
2000	"Taal Se Taal"	Taal	A.R. Rahman	Anand Bakshi
2001	"Kaho Naa... Pyaar Hai"	Kaho Naa... Pyaar Hai	Rajesh Roshan	Ibraheem Ashk

=== Bengal Film Journalists' Association Awards ===
Year	Song	Note
1989	Qayamat Se Qayamat Tak	
2007	Special Award	Hero Honda Voice of All Generations

=== Apsara Award ===
Year	Song	Film	Music director(s)	Lyricist
2004	"Oodhni"	Tere Naam	Himesh Reshammiya	Sameer

=== Sansui Awards ===
Year	Song	Film	Music director(s)	Lyricist
1999	"Kuch Kuch Hota Hai"	Kuch Kuch Hota Hai	Jatin–Lalit	Sameer
2004	"Oodhni"	Tere Naam	Himesh Reshammiya	Sameer

=== Other awards, honours & recognitions ===
- 2000 - International Viewer's Choice Award for MTV India "Kaho Naa Pyaar Hai"
- 2001 – MTV Asia Viewers Choice Award for "Jaane Kyon"- Dil Chahta Hai
- 2004 – Sahara Sangeet Award Best Female Playback for "Tere Naam"- Tere Naam
- 2007 – Sangam Kala Group- Music Awards 2007 Best Playback Singer for Kabhi Alvida Naa Kehna
- 2011 – Gr8 Women Achievers' Award For Outstanding Contribution to Indian Music
- 2011 – Sony Entertainment Asia Pearls Wave Voice of India Honour
- 2011 – Kalakar Awards Best Female Playback for "Milenge Milenge " – Milenge Milenge
- 2011 – Sahyog Foundation- Kala Shiromani Award
- 2011 - 2012 – TSRTV9 National Film Awards- Best Female Playback Singer Honoree
- 2012 – Dr. Ambedkar National Award for Outstanding Contribution to Indian Music
- 2012 – Asia Pacific Brands Foundation Award For Outstanding Contribution To Music
- 2012 – On occasion of 100 years of Hindi Cinema, her song "Taal Se Taal Mila" from the movie Taal voted as the best song of the century in a poll conducted by DesiMartini, Hindustan Times and Fever 104.
- 2012 – Global Indian Music Award For Best Folk Album – Mone Robe
- 2013 – King Vikramaditya National Music Award
- 2013 – Her song "Choli Ke Peeche" from the movie Khalnayak was voted as the hottest song of the century in a poll conducted by Sanona.
- 2016 – Mirchi Music Awards Listener's Choice Song of the Year – "Agar Tum Saath Ho"
- 2019 – Atal Mithila Samman for Outstanding Contribution to Indian Music
- 2021 - Mirchi Music Awards - Listeners' Choice- Song of the decade for "Agar Tum Saath Ho" - Tamasha
- 2021 - ITA Honorary Award
- 2022 – Superstar Singer 2- Lifetime Achievement Award
- 2024 - Brands Impact National Fame Award
- 2024 - Filamchi Awards- Honored
- 2026 - Padma Bhushan

== Nominations for Best Female Playback Singer ==
=== Filmfare Awards ===
Year	Song	Film
1982	"Mere Angne Mein"	Laawaris
1992	"Dekha Hai Pehli Baar"	Saajan
1993	"Aisi Deewangi"	Deewana
1994	"Baazigar O Baazigar"	Baazigar
1994	"Hum Hain Rahi Pyar Ke"	Hum Hain Rahi Pyar Ke
1994	"Palki Main Hogi Sawar"	Khalnayak
1995	"Churake Dil Mera"	Main Khiladi Tu Anari
1995	"Raah Mein Unse"	Vijaypath
1996	"Raja Ko Rani Se"	Akele Hum Akele Tum
1996	"Akhiyan Milaoon"	Raja
1997	"Bahon Ke Darmiyan"	Khamoshi: The Musical
1997	"Pardesi Pardesi"	Raja Hindustani
1998	"Mere Khwaabon Mein Tu"	Gupt
1999	"Chamma Chamma"	China Gate
1999	"Kuch Kuch Hota Hai"	Kuch Kuch Hota Hai
1999	"Ladki Badi Anjaani Hai"	Kuch Kuch Hota Hai
2000	"Chand Chupa Badal Main"	Hum Dil De Chuke Sanam
2001	"Haaye Mera Dil"	Josh
2001	"Panchhi Nadiya"	Refugee
2002	"San Sanana"	Asoka
2002	"Jaane Kyon"	Dil Chahta Hai
2003	"Sanam Mere Humraaz"	Humraaz
2003	"Aapke Pyar Mein"	Raaz
2004	"Tauba Tumhare"	Chalte Chalte
2004	"Oodhni"	Tere Naam
2005	"Lal Dupatta"	Mujhse Shaadi Karogi
2005	"Saanwariya"	Swades
2007	"Kabhi Alvida Naa Kehna"	Kabhi Alvida Naa Kehna
2009	"Tu Muskura"	Yuvvraaj
2016	"Agar Tum Saath Ho"	Tamasha

=== International Indian Film Academy Awards ===
Year	Song	Film
2001	"Dil Ne Yeh Kaha"	Dhadkan
2002	"Jane Kyun Log"	Dil Chahta Hai
2002	"Bole Chudiyan"	Kabhi Khushi Kabhie Gham
2002	"Suraj Hua Maddham"	Kabhi Khushi Kabhie Gham
2003	"Sanam Mere Humraaz"	Humraaz
2003	"Aapke Pyaar Mein Hum"	Raaz
2004	"Kal Ho Naa Ho"	Kal Ho Naa Ho
2004	"Seemaaye Bulaaye"	LOC Kargil
2004	"Oodhni"	Tere Naam
2005	"Ankhe Bandh Karke"	Aitraaz
2005	"Hum Tum"	Hum Tum
2005	"Lal Dupatta"	Mujhse Shaadi Karogi
2007	"Kabhi Alvida Naa Kehna"	Kabhi Alvida Naa Kehna

=== Star Screen Awards ===
Year	Song	Film
2005	"Hum Tum"	Hum Tum
2004	"Oodhni"	Tere Naam
2002	"San Sanana"	Asoka
2002	"Suraj Hua Maddham"	Kabhi Khushi Kabhie Gham
2000	"Taal Se Taal"	Taal
1999	"Gali Mein Aaj Chaand Nikla"	Zakhm
1998	"Kuch Kuch Hota Hai"	Kuch Kuch Hota Hai
1997	"Tanhaai Tanhaai"	Koyla
1996	"Pardesi Pardesi Jana Nahin"	Raja Hindustani

=== Zee Cine Awards ===
Year	Song	Film
2005	"Kyon Ki Itna Pyaar"	Kyon Ki
2004	"Oodhni"	Tere Naam
2002	"Suraj Hua Madham"	Kabhi Khushi Kabhie Gham

=== Mirchi Music Awards ===
Year	Song	Film
2015	"Agar Tum Saath Ho"	Tamasha

=== BBC World Music Awards ===
- 2003 – BBC World Music Award – Asia Pacific
