= Sangeet Samrat =

Marathi TV singing reality show

- Presented by: Priyanka Barve; Rohit Raut
- Judges: Adarsh Shinde; Rahul Deshpande; Kranti Redkar
- Country of origin: India
- Original language: Marathi
- No. of seasons: 3
- No. of episodes: 75

Production
- Production locations: Mumbai, Maharashtra, India
- Camera setup: Multi-camera
- Running time: 45 or 60 minutes

Original release
- Network: Zee Yuva
- Release: 26 June 2017 – 2 December 2018

Sangeet Samrat (transl. Emperor of Music) is an Indian Marathi language television singing reality show which aired on Zee Yuva. It was hosted by Priyanka Barve and Rohit Raut. Adarsh Shinde, Rahul Deshpande and Kranti Redkar were the judges of the show. It was premiered from 26 June 2017 and stopped on 2 December 2018 aired with 3 seasons.

== Seasons ==
Season	Originally Broadcast		Name
Season	First aired	Last aired	Name
1	26 June 2017	6 August 2017	Kids
2	13 June 2018	14 October 2018	Season 2
3	17 October 2018	2 December 2018	Mahasangram
