= Debojit Saha =

Indian Playback Singer

- Born: Debojit Saha; 17 November 1973 (age 52); Silchar, Assam, India
- Genres: Bollywood, Classical, Pop, Rock, Ghazal, Sufi
- Occupations: Singer, Performer, YouTuber, entertainer, music composer, anchor
- Instrument: Vocals
- Years active: 2005–present
- Website: debojitsaha.com

Debojit Saha is an Indian playback singer and performer mainly active in Hindi, Bengali and Assamese language films. Saha was the winner of Zee TV singing reality show, Sa Re Ga Ma Pa Challenge 2005 and was awarded the 'Voice of India' title. He was an anchor for singing reality show Zee Bangla SaReGaMaPa in the year 2006, 2007 and 2008 and he was also a celebrity contestant on Bigg Boss 2 in 2008 hosted by Shilpa Shetty. Debojit was seen as one of the Grand Juries for Zee TV SaReGaMaPa Lil Champs 2017. The theme song of the "Namami Barak" Festival has been composed and conceptualized by Debojit Saha ( both Hindi and Bengali versions), held from 17 to 19 November 2017 at Silchar, Assam, India

== Biography ==
=== Reality shows ===
Saha was placed in Ismail Darbar's "Yalgaar Ho Gharana" in the Sa Re Ga Ma Pa Challenge 2005. On 24 February 2006, he was announced the winner with the title "Voice of India". The competition was based on popular votes. Various organizations like the All Assam Students Union, the North East Students' Union, the Srimanta Sankardeva Sangha and the Hindu Chatra Parishad campaigned in the Northeast states of India to vote for Saha.

He was one of the 14 contestants in season 2 of the TV reality show Bigg Boss.

He participated in STAR Plus's reality show Jo Jeeta Wohi Super Star. His talent was highly appreciated by music composer duo Vishal–Shekhar in this show. But he was voted out of the show.

He was also a participant in STAR Plus's show Music Ka Maha Muqqabla on the Team Shaan's Strikers.

=== Singing career ===
He has lent his voice in Bollywood movies 88 Antop Hill and Jimmy.

Debojit sang the song O more jaan in the Assamese film Junda Iman Gunda. Simultaneously, he also performs at live concerts.

== Discography ==
=== Albums ===
Year	Album name	Composer	Lyricist	Music label	Language
2006	Debojit	Biddu, Ismail Darbar, Annujj Kappoo		SaReGaMa	Hindi
2006	Jeena			SaReGaMa	Hindi
2007	Swapno Sajiye	Chiradip Dasgupta	Sumit Samaddar	SaReGaMa	Bengali
2007	Prithibir Rong	Alaap Dudul Saikia	Alaap Dudul Saikia, Mrinmoy Mrittik	Star Music	Assamese
2008	Mon Haralo	Alaap Dudul Saikia		Times Music	Bengali
2009	Agnee			Venus Music	Assamese
2010	Ei Jibon Nohoi Xuna Bondhu			Encore Entertainment India	Assamese
2011	Thik Bela Tin Ghotikai	Dhrubo, Debojit	Rana Majumder, Saneep Nath	Asha Audio	Bengali
2011	Jodi Moi Kawn				Assamese
2016	Tomake Napale	Tarun Tanmoy	Tarun Tanmoy	DS Productions	Assamese
2017	Tagore for Today; Contemporary Interpretations	Rabindranath Tagore	Rabindranath Tagore	Strumm Sound	Bengali
2017	Tagore for Everyone; Contemporary Hindi Interpretations	Rabindranath Tagore	Rabindranath Tagore	Strumm Sound	Hindi
2019	Shukriya	Debojit Saha	Tripurari	Indie Music Label	Hindi

=== Film songs ===
- 2007 – "O Mure Jaan" from Junda Iman Gunda.
- 2008 – "Marhaba" from Jimmy
- 2010 – "Happy Ending" from Tees Maar Khan with Abhijeet Sawant, Prajakta Shukre and Harshit Saxena
- 2011 – "Chu Chu" from Saheb, Biwi Aur Gangster
- 2012 – Four songs in Borolar Ghor

== Television ==
- Debojit Saha participated as a celebrity contestant in Bigg Boss 2 in 2008, hosted by Shilpa Shetty, and he was in the house for 69 Days.

== Personal life ==
Debojit Saha is married to Bandana, and their daughter was born in 2009.
