= Alka Yagnik =

Indian playback singer (born 1966)

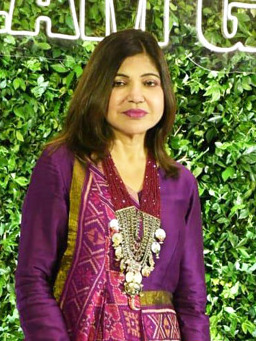
- Yagnik in 2023
- Born: 20 March 1966 (age 60); Kolkata, West Bengal, India
- Occupation: Playback singer
- Spouse: Neeraj Kapoor (m. 1989)
- Children: 1
- Awards: Full list
- Honours: Padma Bhushan (2026)
- Musical career
- Genre: Filmi
- Instrument: Vocals
- Years active: 1980–present

Alka Yagnik (born 20 March 1966) is an Indian playback singer who worked predominantly in Hindi cinema from the 1980s to mid 2010s. One of the most prominent singers of 1990s era Bollywood, she has received several accolades including two National Film Awards, two Bengal Film Journalists' Association Awards and seven Filmfare Awards for Best Female Playback Singer (Note: Tied with Asha Bhosle.) from thirty-seven nominations. She was honoured with the Padma Bhushan by the Government of India for her contribution to Indian music and playback singing in 2026. Alka is cited as 'Voice of a Generation' and has been referred to as the 'Melody Queen' of Indian cinema. Yagnik has sung the most female solo songs in Bollywood, behind only Lata Mangeshkar and Asha Bhosle. Several of her soundtracks were included in the BBC "Top 40 Bollywood soundtracks of all time".

Yagnik is the most popular music artist of all time on YouTube, with a mention in the Guinness Book of World Records stating the figure as 17 billion streams in 2021 and 16.6 billion in 2020. As of 2026, she is the most streamed weekly music artist on Youtube.

== Early life ==
Yagnik was born in Kolkata on 20 March 1966 to a Gujarati family. Her father's name is Dharmendra Shankar. Her mother Shubha was a singer of Indian classical music. In 1972 at age six, she started singing for Akashvani (All India Radio), Calcutta. At age 10, her mother brought her to Mumbai as a child singer. She was advised to wait until her voice matured, but her mother remained determined. On a subsequent visit, Yagnik got a letter of recommendation to Raj Kapoor from his Kolkata distributor. Kapoor heard the girl and sent her with a letter to noted music director Laxmikant Shantaram Kudalkar. Impressed, Laxmikant gave her two alternatives – an immediate start as a dubbing artist or a later break as a singer; Shubha chose the latter for her daughter. Yagnik mentioned that she was a bright student but didn't like studies.

== Career ==
Alka Yagnik began singing at the age of four and was trained in classical music. She has sung romantic, sad, peppy, and item number songs across a career spanning more than four decades. Yagnik frequently sang duets with Kumar Sanu, followed by Udit Narayan and Sonu Nigam, and is regarded as a leading female playback singer of the 1990s. She has credited veteran composers Laxmikant–Pyarelal and Kalyanji–Anandji for mentoring and shaping her voice.

== In the media and legacy ==
Yagnik is recognised as one of the most versatile female playback singers in India. She became the most-streamed Indian artist-mom on Spotify in 2019. Publications such as Rolling Stone, The Times of India, Hindustan Times, and Mid-Day have cited her voice and versatility, and Filmfare has recognised her as one of India's celebrated playback singers. NDTV mentioned Alka as 'Voice of 90s Heroines' and 'Queen of Solos and Duets'. Contemporary singers Lata Mangeshkar, Sunidhi Chauhan, Shaan, Sonu Nigam, Ila Arun, Kumar Sanu and Akriti Kakkar and composers such as A.R. Rahman, Lalit Pandit, Vani Jairam, and M.M. Keeravani have praised her vocal ability, versatility, and contribution to Indian music.

== Personal life ==
Yagnik married Shillong-based businessman Neeraj Kapoor in 1989, with whom she has a daughter named Syesha.

In 2024 she was diagnosed with sensorineural hearing loss.

== Filmography ==
Besides singing, Yagnik also judged several singing reality shows on television.

Year	Name	Notes	Channel	Ref
1992	Sapne Sajan Ke	Yagnik also appeared in film Sapne Sajan Ke in a song 'Yeh Dua Hai Meri' with co-singer Kumar Sanu.	—N/a	—N/a
2006	Sa Re Ga Ma Pa L'il Champs	She made her first television debut with the show.	Zee TV	
2014	Comedy Nights with Kapil	On 25 May 2014 she appeared as a special guest along with Kumar Sanu for the popular TV show Comedy Nights with Kapil.	Colors TV	
2014	Sa Re Ga Ma Pa Li'l Champs 2014	She had done Sa Re Ga Ma Pa L'il Champs as a judge in first Season and fifth Season as a Maha Guru (also in previous 2 seasons).	Zee TV	
2016	Bhabiji Ghar Par Hain!	In November 2016, she appeared in a Hindi comedy serial Bhabiji Ghar Par Hain! with Kumar Sanu in a special one hour episode.	&TV	
2017	Yeh Rishta Kya Kehlata Hai	Yagnik also appeared as a guest in Hindi serial 'Yeh Rishta Kya Kehlata Hai'	STAR Plus	
2017	Sa Re Ga Ma Pa Li'l Champs 2017	She came with her co-singer Udit Narayan and sung many duets of the 1990s.	Zee TV	
2018	Rising Star	She appears as a guest and gave a special tribute to late actress Sridevi	Colors	
2018	Indian Idol	She appeared in 10th season of Indian Idol with co-singer Kumar Sanu.	Sony Entertainment Television	
2019	The Kapil Sharma Show	She appeared in The Kapil Sharma Show with other two judges for the promotion of her show 'Superstar Singer'.	Sony Entertainment Television	
2019	Superstar Singer	In 2019, she appeared in Superstar Singer as a Judge in Sony TV.	Sony Entertainment Television	
2020	Sa Re Ga Ma Pa Li'l Champs 2020	Besides Alka Yagnik, Udit Narayan and Kumar Sanu appeared as judges after 30 years.	Zee TV	

She also appeared in Star Voice of India as a judge. She appears as a guest with Udit Narayan in Sa Re Ga Ma Pa L'il Champs.

== Awards and nominations ==
Yagnik has won several accolades including two National Film Award for Best Female Playback Singer for her songs: "Ghoongat Ki Aad Se" from Hum Hain Rahi Pyar Ke (1993) and "Kuch Kuch Hota Hai" from Kuch Kuch Hota Hai (1998). She has won a record seven Filmfare Award for Best Female Playback Singer (Note: Tied with Asha Bhosle.) for her songs: "Ek Do Teen" from Tezaab (1988), "Choli Ke Peeche Kya Hai" from Khalnayak (1993), "Zara Tasveer Se Tu" from Pardes (1998), "Taal Se Taal" from Taal (2000), "Dil Ne Yeh Kaha Hai Dil Se" from Dhadkan (2001), "O Re Chhori" from Lagaan (2002) and "Hum Tum" from Hum Tum (2005) from a record thirty-six nominations. Additionally she has won two Bengal Film Journalists' Association Awards. For her contribution in the field of music, Yagnik was bestowed with the Lata Mangeshkar Award in 2013. She was awarded Padma Bhushan in 2026.

== See also ==
- List of Indian playback singers
