= Sa Re Ga Ma Pa Mega Challenge =

2009 special installment of the Indian vocal contest

Sa Re Ga Ma Pa Mega Challenge was a special installment of the popular Indian Sa Re Ga Ma Pa vocal contest shown on Zee TV. This show was a seven-week-long competition among eight teams representing eight different states and consisting of total 24 talented contestants from past seasons of Sa Re Ga Ma Pa. Two teams were competing against each other each week starting 30 October 2009, to head towards the finales. The show was made to celebrate the 1000th episode of Sa Re Ga Ma Pa, and the Grand Finale on 12 Dec 2009 marked the 1000th episode of this great singing competition - a historic moment for any show on Indian television. Notable Indian singers and musicians were selected for each of the episodes to make the decisions as the judges.

The final was between West Bengal Abhijit Ghoshal, Keka Ghoshal and Sanchita Bhattacharya) and Maharashtra (Vaishali Made, Kaushik Deshpande and Rohit Raut) where the latter team was declared as a winner. Sonu Nigam, Suresh Wadkar and Pyarelal were seen as the panel of judges for the grand night.

== Judges ==
The judges are:

- 30 & 31 October - Asha Bhonsle
- 6 & 7 November - Sadhana Sargam and Pritam
- 13 & 14 November - Suresh Wadkar and Alka Yagnik
- 20 & 21 November - Salim–Sulaiman and Pyarelal
- 27 & 28 November - Abhijeet Bhattacharya, Bappi Lahiri and Kavita Krishnamurthy
- 4 & 5 December - Kumar Sanu and Udit Narayan
- 11 December - Jatin Pandit, Anand, Daler Mehndi
- 12 December(1000th episode) - Sonu Nigam, Pyarelal and Suresh Wadkar

== Hosts ==
The hosts of Mega Challenge are:

- Vipul Roy and Manish Paul
- Karan Singh Rathore and Archana Jani (only for the first week of 30-31 Oct)

Karan Singh and Archana Jani are Radio hosts, called "Radio Jockey" or "RJ" in India. They presented impressive Hindi voices in this show, but may have fallen short on expectations of TV audience.

== Contestants ==
The contestants/captains who participate in this show are:

Name	State	SRGMP-year
Parthiv Gohil	Gujarat	1997
Sumedha Karmahe	Madhya Pradesh	2007
Twinkle Bajpai	Uttar Pradesh	2005
Vaishali Made	Maharashtra	2009
Joy Chakraborty	Assam	2007
Tarun Sagar	Punjab	2009
Raja Hassan	Rajasthan	2007
Abhijit Ghoshal	West Bengal	2004

== Teams ==
Assam:

- Captain: Joy Chakraborty
- Anamika Choudhari
- Abhigyan Das

Gujarat:

- Captain: Parthiv Gohil
- Deepali Somaiya
- Prachi Shah

West Bengal:

- Captain: Abhijit Ghoshal Runner up of Mega Challenge
- Keka Ghoshal
- Sanchita Bhattacharya

Madhya Pradesh:

- Captain: Sumedha Karmahe
- Amir Hafiz
- Pratibha Singh Baghel

Maharashtra:

- Captain: Vaishali Mhade Winner of Mega challenge! 1000 episode winner!
- Kaushik Deshpande
- Rohit Raut

Punjab:

- Captain: Tarun Sagar
- Harpreet Deol
- Rohanpreet Singh

Rajasthan:

- Captain: Raja Hassan
- Dilshad Ali
- Priyanka Maliya

Uttar Pradesh:

- Captain: Twinkle Bajpai
- Hemant Brijwasi
- Poonam Yadav

== Versus ==
- 30 & 31 October - Maharashtra vs. Uttar Pradesh
- 6 & 7 November - Madhya Pradesh vs. Gujarat
- 13 & 14 November - Assam vs. Rajasthan
- 20 & 21 November - West Bengal vs. Punjab
- 27 & 29 November - Gujarat vs. Maharashtra
- 4 & 5 December - West Bengal vs. Assam
- 11 & 12 December - Maharashtra vs. West Bengal

== Points ==
       *Maharashtra  vs. Uttar Pradesh
                    *Friday

- Group Song 1 6 *Group Song 1 6
- Duet Song 2 10 *Duet Song 2 7
- Duet Song 3 6 *Duet Song 3 6
- Total 22 * Total 19

     *Maharashtra  vs. Uttar Pradesh
                   *Saturday

- Vaishali Made 10 *Twinkle Bajpai 8
- Kaushik Deshpande 8 *Hemant Brijwasi 9
- Rohit Raut 8 *Poonam Yadav 7
- Total 48 Total 43

Winner Maharashtra pass to the Semifinal!

              *Gujarat   vs.  Madhya Pradesh
                        *Friday

- Group Song 1 7 *Group Song 1 8.5
- Duet Song 2 9 *Duet Song 2 7.5
- Duet Song 3 8 *Duet Song 3 6.5
- Jungalbandi 5 *Jungalbandi 5
- Total 29 * Total 27.5

                *Gujarat     vs.     Madhya Pradesh
                          *Saturday

- Parthiv Gohil 9 *Sumedha Karmahe 8
- Deepali Somaiya 7 *Amir Hafiz 9.5
- Prachi Shah 8 *Pratibha Singh Baghel 8
- Jugalbandi 6 *Jugalbandi 4
- Total 59 * Total 57

Winner Gujarat pass to the Semifinal!

                  *Rajasthan     vs.        Assam
                              *Friday

- Group Song 1 7 *Group Song 1 8
- Duet Song 2 8 *Duet Song 2 9
- Duet Song 3 8 *Duet Song 3 9.5
- Jugalbandi 5 *Jugalbandi 5
- Total 28 * Total 31.5

                  *Rajasthan     vs.        Assam
                             *Saturday

- Raja Hassan 10 *Joy Chakraborty 8
- Dilshad Ali 9 *Anamika Choudhari 9.5
- Priyanka Maliya 7.5 *Abhigyan Das 9
- Jugalbandi 6 *Jugalbandi 4
- Total 60.5 * Total 62

Winner Assam pass to the Semifinal!

                     *West Bengal    vs.           Punjab
                                  *Friday

- Group Song 1 7 *Group Song 1 5
- Duet Song 2 7 *Duet Song 2 7
- Duet Song 3 5 *Duet Song 3 7
- Jugalbandi 5 *Jugalbandi 4
- Total 24 * Total 23

                     *West Bengal    vs.           Punjab
                                  *Saturday

- Abhijit Ghoshal 8 *Tarun Sagar 9
- Keka Ghoshal 8 *Harpreet Deol 4
- Sanchita Bhattacharya 7 *Rohanpreet Singh 7
- Jugalbandi 5 *Jugalbandi 5
- Total 52 * Total 48

Winner West Bengal pass to the Semifinal!

                                *1st Semifinal
                       *Maharashtra       vs.       Gujarat
                                           *Friday

- Duet Song 1 7 *Duet Song 1 8
- Vaishali Made 8 *Parthiv Gohil 8
- Kaushik Deshpande 8 *Deepali Somaiya 6
- Rohit Raut 8 *Prachi Shah 9
- Total 31 * Total 31

                       *Maharashtra       vs.             Gujarat
                                       *Saturday

- Duet Song 1 8 *Duet Song 1 6.5
- Vaishali Made 10 *Parthiv Gohil 8.5
- Kaushik Deshpande 8 *Deepali Somaiya 7
- Rohit Raut 7.5 *Prachi Shah 7.5
- Jugalbandi 5 *Jugalbandi 5
- Total 69.5 * Total 64.5

Winner Maharashtra and is the Mega Finalist of Sa Re Ga Ma Pa Mega Challenge!

                                     2nd Semifinal
                       *West Bengal            vs.              Assam
                                             Friday

- Duet Song 1 10 *Duet Song 1 8
- Abhijit Ghoshal 8 *Joy Chakraborty 9
- Keka Ghoshal 9 *Anamika Choudhari 10
- Sanchita Bhattacharya 10 *Abhigyan Das 10
- Total 37 * Total 37

                       *West Bengal             vs.              Assam
                                              Saturday

- Duet Song 1 9 *Duet Song 1 9
- Abhijit Ghoshal 10 *Joy Chakraborty 9.5
- Keka Ghoshal 10 *Anamika Choudhari 10
- Sanchita Bhattacharya 10 *Abhigyan Das 10
- Jugalbandi 5 *Jugalbandi 5
- Total 81 * Total 80.5

THE FINALS

The final was between West Bengal (Abhijit Ghoshal, Keka Ghoshal and Sanchita Bhattacharya) and Maharashtra (Vaishali Made, Kaushik Deshpande and Rohit Raut) where the latter team was declared as a winner. Sonu Nigam, Suresh Wadkar and Pyrelal were seen as the panel of judges for the grand night.

== Eliminations ==
Here are the eliminations so far:

- Episode 2 - Uttar Pradesh: Twinkle Bajpai
- Episode 4 - Madhya Pradesh: Sumedha Karmahe
- Episode 6 - Rajasthan: Raja Hasan
- Episode 8 - Punjab: Tarun Sagar
- Episode 10 - Gujarat: Parthiv Gohil
- Episode 12 - Assam: Joy Chakraborty
- Episode 14 - West Bengal: Abijit Ghoshal
