= Anbalaya Films =

Indian film production and distribution company

- Type: Film production Film distribution
- Industry: Entertainment
- Founded: 1987
- Headquarters: Chennai, India
- Products: Motion pictures (Tamil)
- Owner: K. Prabhakaran

Anabalaya Films is an Indian film production and distribution company headed by K. Prabhakaran.

== History ==
The studio is led by K. Prabhakaran, who later adopted the stage name Anbalaya Prabhakaran. In the 1990s the studio specialized in making low budget Tamil films with upcoming directors. Some of the directors that the studio introduced include Agathiyan and Prabhu Solomon. In addition to producing, Prabhakaran also acted in his productions, mostly portraying negative roles.

In the early 2000s, Prabhakaran signed on Arjun Sarja to work on a film for the studio. The duo initially planned to team up for a film titled Chanakya to be directed by Shaji Kailas, but later dropped the plan. Subsequently, Arjun directed and starred in Parasuram (2003).

In 2004, the studio made a comeback by producing the college drama Pazhaniappa Kalloori (2007) starring Naveen Chandra, Arjumman Mughal, Madhu Shalini and Akshaya Rao.

Later Prabhakaran began working as an actor and appeared in character roles. He also became actively involved in the Tamil Film Producers Council.

== Filmography ==
Title	Year	Language	Director	Cast	Synopsis	Ref.
Pattikaatu Thambi	1988	Tamil	Senthilnathan	Arjun, Nirosha, Sabitha Anand	A naive, innocent man learns about his father's death at the hands of a cruel landlord and decides to avenge his death.	
Yogam Rajayogam	1989	Tamil	T. S. Krishna Kumar	Ramki, Pallavi, S. Ve. Shekher		
Thangathin Thangam	1990	Tamil	Siraj	Ramarajan, Ragasudha		
Vaigasi Poranthachu	1990	Tamil	Radha Bharathi	Prashanth, Kaveri	A boy and a girl from different castes face opposition to their love.	
Aatha Un Koyilile	1991	Tamil	Kasthuri Raja	Selva, Kasthuri	After losing his fiancé to a caste-based honor killing, village blacksmith Marudhu protects another couple from suffering the same fate.	
Thoothu Po Chellakkiliye	1991	Tamil	Kasthuri Raja	Varunraj, Kasthuri, Shenbaga	A doctor who arrives in village is torn between his affection for two girls.	
Therku Theru Machan	1992	Tamil	Manivannan	Sathyaraj, Bhanupriya	Subramaniam is in love with Parimala, but both hail from different villages who share a history of rivalry.	
Pondatti Rajyam	1992	Tamil	K. S. Ravikumar	Saravanan, Ranjitha, Raja Ravindra	A man is forced to provide shelter for his dead friend's pregnant lover, which sows the seeds of suspicion in the mind of his wife.	
Madhumathi	1993	Tamil	Agathiyan	Prasanna, Madhumitha		
Veettai Paaru Naattai Paaru	1994	Tamil	Thulasidas	Saravanan, Ranjitha	A retired army man is upset with his sons supporting opposing political parties, which leads to huge problems.	
Murai Mappillai	1995	Tamil	Sundar C	Arun Vijay, Krithika, Rajashree	A boy and a girl whose fathers are friends are in loggerheads however they later fall in love after their fathers turn enemies.	
Kannodu Kanbathellam	1999	Tamil	Prabhu Solomon	Arjun, Sonali Bendre, Suchindra	A rich guy creates trouble for young lovers after their prank resulting in his lover misunderstanding and breaking up with him.	
Thai Poranthachu	2000	Tamil	R. K. Kalaimani	Prabhu, Kasualya	A house broker rents out a home to a woman and is forced to lie to the villainous real owner of the house that she is his wife.	
Engalukkum Kaalam Varum	2001	Tamil	Balaruban	Livingston, Kausalya, Vadivelu	Kuppan stays at his uncle Mannangatti's house. When Mannangatti decides to get his children married, one of his daughters marries Kuppan in secret.	
Parasuram	2003	Tamil	Arjun	Arjun, Kiran Rathod, Abbas	Parasuram, an honest cop, is in search of the leader of a terrorist organization who brainwashes youngsters into becoming terrorists.	
Pazhaniappa Kalloori	2007	Tamil	R. Pavan	Naveen Chandra, Arjumman Mughal, Madhu Shalini, Akshaya Rao	A poor boy gets into college, where he has to contend with love and gangs.	
