= Bloody Isshq =

- Theatrical release poster
- Directed by: Arup Dutta
- Written by: Arati Bhattacharya; Dialogue Writer; Sanjeev Tiwari
- Produced by: Kunal Singh
- Starring: Akash Singh; Shilpa Anand; Tripta Parashar
- Cinematography: Arvind Kumar
- Edited by: Sanjay Sankla
- Music by: Ashok Bhadra
- Production company: Ashavari Media Pvt Ltd
- Release date: 1 March 2013
- Country: India
- Language: Hindi

Bloody Isshq (transl. Bloody love) is a 2013 Bollywood romantic suspense drama film directed by Arup Dutta of Morning Walk fame. The film stars Akash, Shilpa Anand, and Tripta Parashar. It began filming in November 2011, and is slated to release in 2013.

== Plot ==
Natasha is the hotel heiress of Eagle Group of Hotels, brash, defiant, and a man-eater. While travelling to a party, she meets with an accident which is life-threatening, had it not been for the presence of Nirvaan Shroff. Nirvaan saves Natasha from the accident, but his attitude and rough around the edges persona attract her to him, but Nirvaan is not the one to be taken in easily. A wager from her friend starts the game of seduction between Natasha and Nirvaan. But what unfolds is something that even Natasha had not thought of. She actually falls for him, not knowing the fact that Nirvaan is married to Radhika who is staying in Pattaya. What happens next and what Nirvaan does is what forms the finale of Bloody Isshq.

== Cast ==
- Akash Singh as Nirvaan Shroff
- Shilpa Anand as Radhika
- Tripta Pareshar as Natasha Kapoor
- Mukesh Tiwari as Officer Vikram Rathod
- Simran Sachdeva as Sayani das
- Karanveer Mehra as Rahul
- Vikram Sahu as Mr. Oberoi
- Manoj Tiger as VIP Singh
- Shubham as Jatin Grewal
- Kuldeep Mallik
- Daisy Shah (Item Number)

== Soundtrack ==
The music was composed by Ashok Bhadra and released by Worldwide Records Limited. All lyrics were written by Kumaar.

Bloody Isshq

Soundtrack album by Ashok Bhadra
- Released: 2013
- Recorded: 2013
- Genre: Soundtrack
- Length: 37:39
- Label: Worldwide Records Limited
- Producer: Ashok Bhadra

Track list
No.	Title	Singer(s)	Length
1.	"Falsafa"	KK	4:19
2.	"Danger Hai Laila"	Sunidhi Chauhan	4:25
3.	"Ajab Hai Ye Zindagi"	KK	5:13
4.	"Badlon Ki Hai Saazish" (Duet Version)	Sonu Nigam, Shreya Ghoshal	5:08
5.	"Janam"	Sunidhi Chauhan	4:59
6.	"Hawa Lagi Hai"	Javed Ali, June Banerjee	4:59
7.	"Kill Me"	Zubeen Garg, Usha Uthup	3:30
8.	"Badlon Ki Hai Saazish"	Sonu Nigam	5:06
Total length:			37:39
