= Ya Rab =

- Poster of Ya Rab
- Directed by: Hasnain Hyderabadwala
- Written by: Ikram Akhtar
- Screenplay by: Ikram Akhtar
- Story by: Ikram Akhtar
- Produced by: Mohsin Ali Khan; Meesam Ali Khan; Hoori Ali Khan
- Starring: Ajaz Khan; Arjumman Mughal; Vikram Singh; Manzar Sehbai; Akhilendra Mishra; Imran Hasnee
- Edited by: Sanjay Ingle
- Music by: Amjad - Nadeem
- Production company: True Films
- Distributed by: Vishesh Films
- Release date: 7 February 2014 (India)
- Running time: 120 minutes
- Country: India
- Language: Hindi
- Budget: ₹ 2.50 crore

Ya Rab (transl. Oh lord!) is a 2014 Indian Hindi-language film directed by Hasnain Hyderabadwala, and starring Ajaz Khan, Arjumman Mughal, Raju Kher, Vikram Singh and Imran Hasnee. The film shows the battle between two ideologies. One group represents the Islamic principles of compassion and respect for human life, while the other incites youth to avenge alleged atrocities against Muslims.

Filmmaker Mahesh Bhatt promoted Ya Rab. It was released on 7 February 2014 through his company, Vishesh Films.

== Plot ==
Ikram (Raju Kher) is a practicing Muslim living happily with his family in Lucknow. His brother, Maulana Jilani (Akhilendra Mishra), is a much respected Muslim face. Having a huge following, the maulana gets his followers out of trouble with the authorities, thus adding to his power. But the maulana’s intentions are not what they seem to be. He has a sinister side to him, that of inciting mobs and spreading terrorism. He specialises in choosing boys for suicide bombing missions and brainwashes them in various ways, including showing them films of atrocities against Muslims.

On the tail of the maulana is the ATS cop, Rann Vijay Singh (Ajaz Khan), who has information that something is slated to happen in Lucknow on a certain date. Khan's love life has been shattered after his Muslim fiancée learnt that her brother is also a terrorist. She decides to atone for him by not marrying. Gradually, Ran Vijay has zeroed in on the maulana and worked out that a suicide bomber will destroy a crowded mall in the city. He makes it to the mall, only to see the bomb going off.

The bomb blast will haunt the maulana, as one of the victims is his brother’s pregnant daughter-in-law, Amreen (Arjumman Mughal). Ran Vijay’a hopes rested on her since she was seen talking to the bomber before it went off, which meant she knew him. She is the only witness to the bombing, but she is brain-dead. While the surgeon Dr.Mazhar (Manzar Sehbai) wants to keep her alive till the doctors can bring the child out of her, the maulana makes all the efforts to kill her, including threatening Dr.Mazhar with mob violence and the destruction of his hospital.

== Cast ==
- Ajaz Khan .. Ran Vijay Singh
- Arjumman Mughal .. Amreen
- Vikram Singh .. Imran Khan
- Raju Kher .. Ikram
- Akhilendra Mishra .. Maulana Jilani
- Manzar Sehbai .. Dr. Mazhar
- Indrapal Ahuja .. Afzal
- Neha Baam .. Ikram's mother
- Vikram Dahiya .. Aslam Goonga
- Rakesh Deewana .. Nanhey Nawab
- Rajesh Gupta .. A.T.S Officer
- Imran Hasnee .. Javed
- Abizer Hyderabadwala .. Hamja
- Jasbir Jassi .. Jasbir A.T.S Officer

== Release ==
Jamiat Ulama-e-Maharashtra filed a PIL before Bombay High Court against the release of the movie. Later, the Bombay High Court permitted release of Ya Rab of 7 February 2014 without controversial scenes and dialogues.

The film was released on 7 February 2014.

== See also ==
- Bollywood films of 2014
