= Sanjib Sarkar =

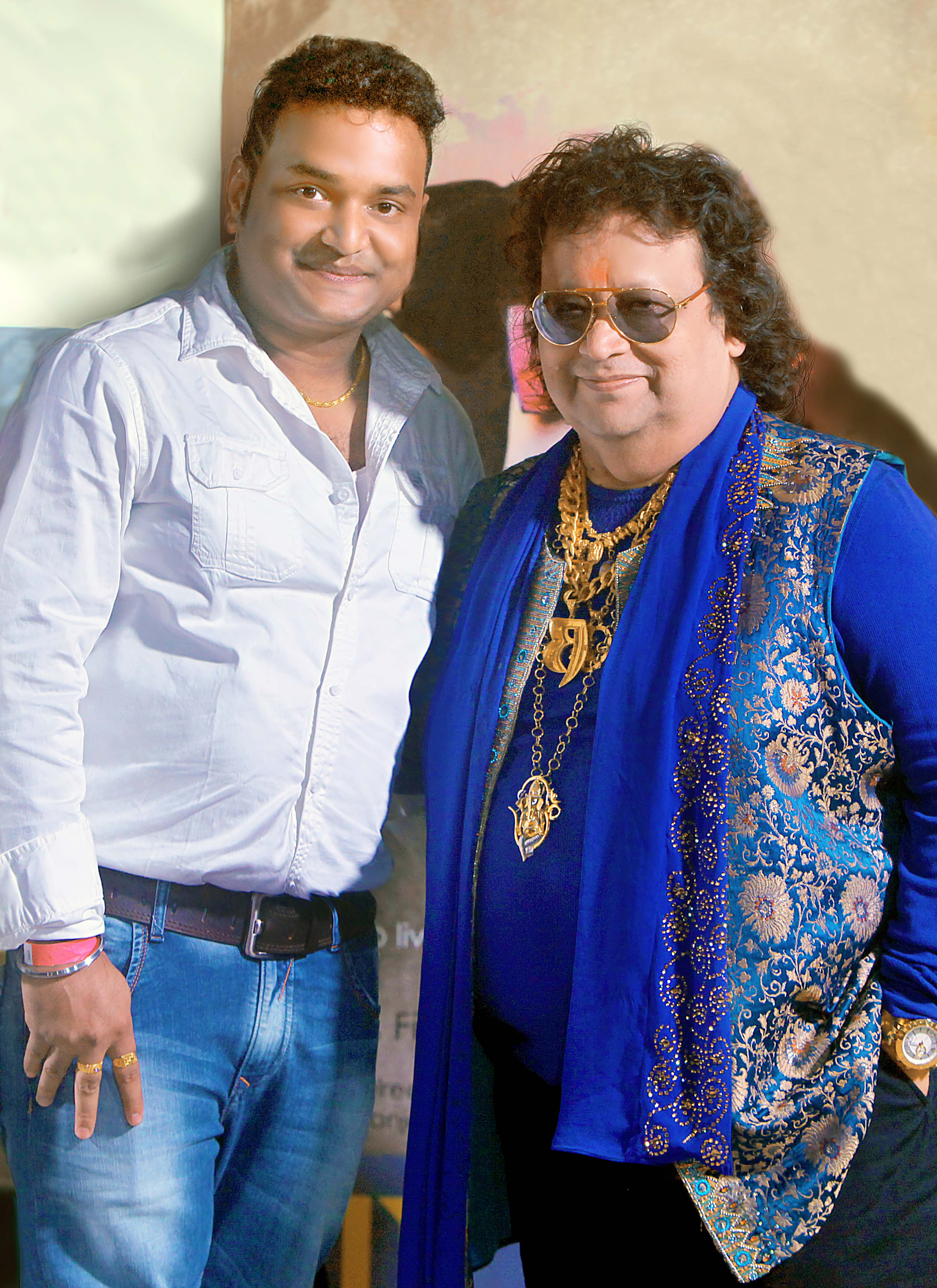
- Sarkar with Bappi Lahiri at the premiere of Umformung: The Transformation

Background information
- Also known as: Sanju
- Born: Sanjib Sarkar; 16 November 1986 (age 39); Bankura, West Bengal, India
- Genres: Bollywood, film music
- Occupations: Composer; Sound designer, Background music director
- Instruments: Electronic keyboard; Vocals; Percussion; Harmonium; Melodica
- Years active: 2014
- Labels: Saregama
- Website: Official website

Sanjib Sarkar (Bengali: সঞ্জীব সরকার) is an Indian sound designer, music director and film score composer

== Early life ==
He was born on 16 November 1986 in Bankura, West Bengal, India, to Bengali parents, Debi Prasad Sarkar and Ratna Sarkar. He stayed in Bankura until he was 18, when Sarkar moved to Kolkata after completing Higher Secondary from Akui Union high School, He started learning classical music from his Guruji Sri Provash Dey and received training in Sound Design from Sri. Pankaj Seal (SRFTI)

== Education ==
He is an alumnus of Bangabasi Morning College (University of Calcutta).

== Career ==
After completed his graduation he started composing jingle music for various brands including:

- Emami Healthy & Tasty Oil,
- Asian Paints,
- MTS Mobile,
- Trendy World Garments,
- Turtle Clothing,
- Cookme (Spice),
- Anmol Feeds,
- Cute Soap,
- Bandhan Bank

== Film music ==
Sarkar's first film score was for Sudhamoy Babur Advut Galpo, directed by Anindya Chatterjee and released in 2011. In 2014, his score for Masoom included the song "Halka Nesha Halka". He received several awards at film festivals for his music for the 2016 film Umformung: The Transformation.

== Works ==
=== Feature films ===
Year	Film	Director	Singer	Production	Ref.
2018	Lust	Emhyr Alharic	Background Music & Sound Design	Nez Moving Pixels	
2017	Paradiso	Emhyr Alharic	Kavita Krishnamurthy & Sadhana Sargam	Nez Moving Pixels	
2016	Umformung: The Transformation	Sudeep Ranjan Sarkar	Akshaya Rao, & Angelina Grace	Nez Moving Pixels	
2016	Langto - The Film	Sourish Dey	Subhankar Panda & Soumallya Mitra	Octave Studio Kolkata	
2016	Chhip Suto Char	Susanta Saha	Abheri Gupta	Frienever Motions Pictures	
2015	Na Jene Mon	Abhisek Roy	Rupankar, Akriti Kakkar, Arun Daga & Prasenjit Mallick	Golden Deer Entertainment	
2014	Masoom	Partha Sarathi Joardar	Sanchita Bhattacharya & Madhuri Dey	PB Films	
2012	Joker	Jeet Chatterjee	Background Music & Sound Design	Sony Aath	
2011	Sudhamoy Babur Advut Galpo	Anindya Chatterjee	Background Music	Tara Muzik	

==== Horror films ====
Year	Title	Channel	Production	Ref.
2012	Saheb Barir Bhoot	Sony Entertainment	Sony Aath	
2012	Circuit House	Sony Entertainment	Sony Aath	
2012	Jangaler Oi Banshita	Sony Entertainment	Sony Aath	
2012	Dorja Ta Khola Thak	Sony Entertainment	Sony Aath	

=== Television ===
He has composed title tracks for television series including:

- Disha
- Mukti Snan
- Hiyar Majhe
- Arundhutir Chiti
- Ektu Sukher Khonje

=== Other ===
He also composed music for various corporate films, short films and documentary films including:

- Expedition Challenge for NIBS
- Larsen & Toubro Tubes for Anthelion Technology
- Reincarneation (Documentary)
- Poisonman Vs Ross
- Rhythm Of Soul (Bengali Short Film)
- Sri Gourio Math
- H2O (Bengali Short Film)
- Putul Nach (Bengali Short Film)
- Dhoni (Bengali Short Film)
- Nayer Meye (Bengali Short Film)
- Mofu Tofu (Bengali Short Film)
- Rojnamcha (Daily Journal)
- She (Bengali Short Film)
- Status (Bengali Short Film)

== Albums ==
Year	Album	Singer	Note	Record label	Ref.
2009	Shishir Bheja Jochhna	Various	Music Composer	UD Series	
2014	Road Side Garden	The National Beats Band	Music Producer	Octave Studio Kolkata	
2014	JKB	Rana Dev	Music Producer	Octave Studio Kolkata	

== Soundtrack ==
No.	Title	Singer(s)	Length
1.	"Mon Amar"	Akriti Kakkar	4:24
2.	"Oh Baby"	Rupankar & Sanjib	3:16
3.	"Dard Ka Daria"	Akshaya Rao	3:54
4.	"Jara Chunle"	Shaoli Mukherjee	2:43
5.	"Ferari Mon"	Arun Daga	3:26
6.	"Hale Dil"	Prosenjit Mallick, Sangrami	4:52
7.	"Aaji E Badal Dhara"	Rimi Biswas	4:54
8.	"Aamar Shesh Kodita"	Rimi Biswas	4:11
9.	"Halka Nesha Halka"	Madhuri Dey & Sanchita Bhattacharya	5:03

== Awards ==
Award	Film	Category	Location	Year	Result	Ref
Anandalok Puraskar	Masoom	Best Music	Kolkata	2014	Won	

== See also ==
- List of Indian film music directors
