= Girish Chandra Bose =

Indian educator and botanist

Girish Chandra Bose (29 October 1853 – 1 January 1939) was an Indian educator and botanist.

== Early life and education ==
Bose was born on 29 October 1853 in the village of Berugram in the Burdwan district of India. He attended Hooghly College, and received a BA degree in 1876. After graduation, he was hired as a lecturer of science at Ravenshaw College, where he worked until 1881.

At the end of 1881, he was offered a state scholarship to study agriculture at the Royal Agricultural College in Cirencester, England. In 1882 he took up life membership of the Royal Agricultural Society, and in 1883 was elected a Fellow of the Chemical Society. He completed his degree at the Royal Agricultural College in 1884. After visits to Scotland, France and Italy, he returned to India.

== Bangabasi school and college ==
While in England, Bose came to believe in the importance of widespread education. Accordingly, shortly after his return, he turned down offers of employment from various provincial governments, but in 1885 founded Bangabasi School, which was aimed at preparing boys for the university entrance examinations. The institution was expanded in 1887 to add college-level classes (at Bangabasi College). He remained involved in administration of the college until near the end of his life.

The college that Bose began is still operating in a somewhat different form: it was reorganized in the 1960s into Acharya Girish Chandra Bose College, Bangabasi Morning College, Bangabasi Evening College, and Bangabasi College.

== Botanical work ==
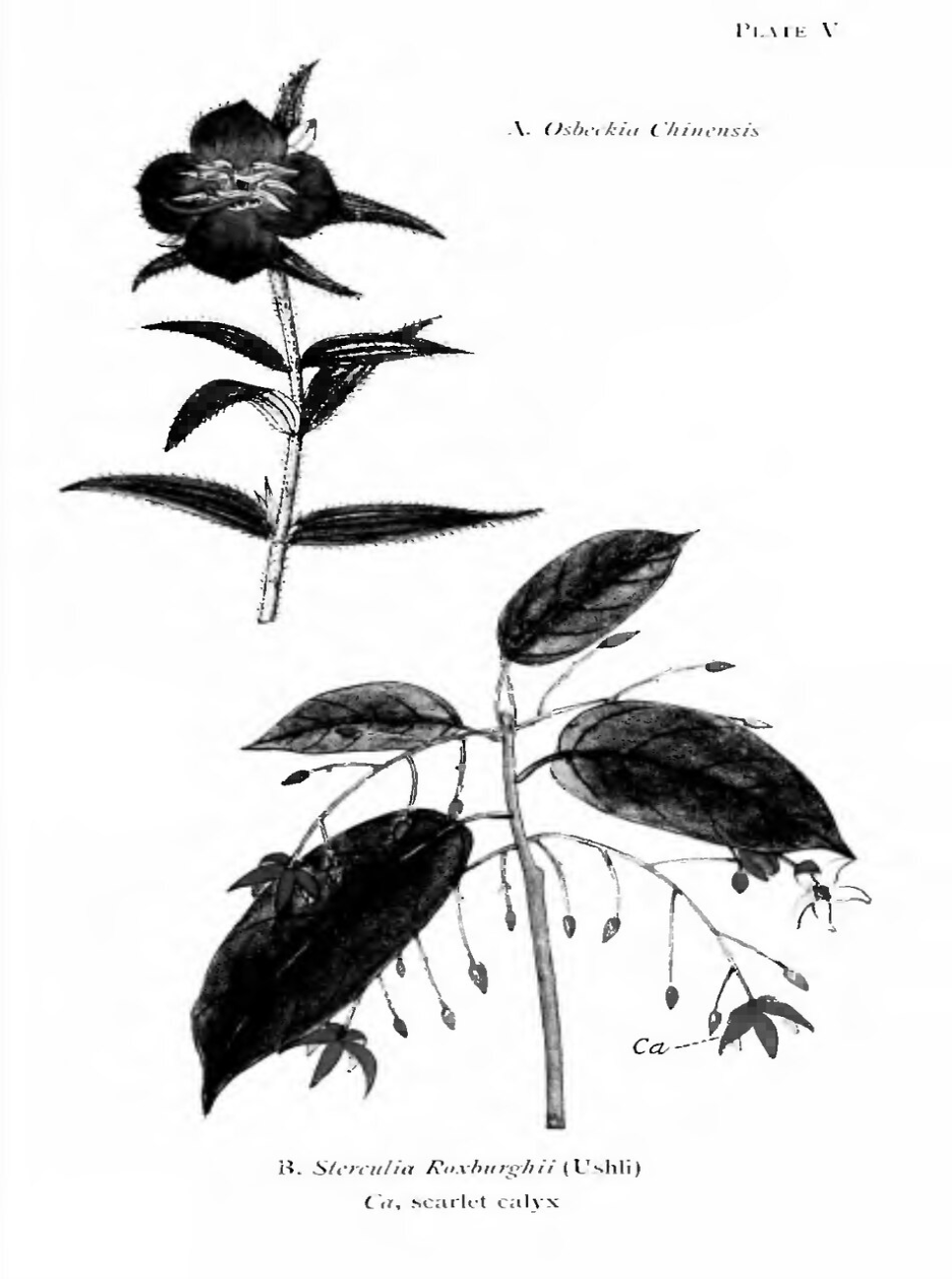
An illustration from Bose's A Manual of Indian Botany

Bose wrote a botany book, A Manual of Indian Botany. The book was intended as a textbook containing plants familiar to Indian students, in contrast to the European textbooks commonly used in India at the time. He is also credited with starting the first agricultural journal in India. The journal, founded in 1885, was published both in English (as Agricultural Gazette) and in Bengali (as Krishi Gazette).

== Death ==
Bose died 1 January 1939, after a short illness.

== Books ==
- Bose, Girish Chandra (1920). A Manual of Indian Botany. Bombay, London, and Glasgow: Blackie and Son Limited. LCCN 2002564362.

In addition to this English-language book, Bose also published a number of books in Bengali, including:

- Bhu-tattva (1882)
- Krishi Sopan (1888)
- Krishi Parichay (1890)
- Gacher Katha (1910)
- Udvid Gyan (1923–25)
