= Akash Singh (actor) =

Indian actor

- Born: 1987 (age 38–39)
- Education: MMK College of Commerce and Economics, Mumbai, (graduation)
- Occupations: Actor; singer; music composer
- Years active: 2011–present (actor)
- Parents: Kunal Singh (father); Arati Bhattacharya (mother)

Akash Singh Yadav (born 1987) is an Indian actor who works in Bhojpuri cinema, Hindi cinema, Bengali cinema and theatre.

== Early life ==
Singh was born in Mumbai in 1987 to Bhojpuri actor Kunal Singh and Bengali actress Arati Bhattacharya.

== Acting in feature films ==
His first movie Onde Ondu Sari was a Kannada movie. His second movie Bloody Isshq was released on 1 March 2013, The film was made under Aashawari Media Pvt Ltd. After the success of the film he migrated to Bhojpuri cinema. He is also works as a singer in several hindi and Bengali movies.

== Filmography ==
- Onde Ondu Sari (Kannada) 2011
- Achena Prem (Bengali ) 2011 (actor)
- Hari Om Hari (Oriya) 2013
- Sweetheart (Bengali, Telugu) (actor, Director Writer) 2013
- Mr Rajesh (Telugu) 2013
- Bloody Isshq (Hindi) 2013
- Action (Bengali) (Musician) 2014
- Masoom (Bengali) 2014
- Tere Jaisa Yaar Kahan (2017)
- Bhauji Pataniya (Bhojpuri) (2018)
- Chor Police (Bhojpuri) (2019)
- Drive (Singer) (2019)
- Aankh Micholi (2021)
- Priya Beauty Parlour (2025)
