= Sudhamoy Babur Advut Galpo =

- Film poster
- Directed by: Anindya Chatterjee
- Produced by: Tara Muzik
- Starring: Manoj Mitra, Kuchil Mukhopadhaya, Tapash Sinha
- Music by: Sanjib Sarkar
- Production company: Tara Muzik
- Release date: 2011
- Running time: 24 minutes
- Country: India
- Language: Bengali

Sudhamoy Babur Advut Galpo is a 2011 Indian film, which was directed by Anindya Chatterjee.

== Plot ==
Sudhamoy, the protagonist, has no family and his only companions are his servant Khoma and an inherited pocket watch. Sudhamoy's daily life revolves around this watch, which he becomes completely obsessed with and solely starts believing in at one point in time. How this obsession changes his life is the central focus of the story. The story is a portrayal of our lives becoming mechanised.

== Music ==
The film's music was written by Sanjib Sarkar.
