= Palaniappa Kalluri =

- Poster
- Directed by: R. Pavan
- Produced by: K. Prabhakaran
- Starring: Pradeep; Arjumman Mughal; Madhu Shalini; Akshaya Rao
- Cinematography: G. B. Krishna
- Music by: R. P. Patnaik
- Production company: Anbalaya Films
- Release date: 21 December 2007
- Country: India
- Language: Tamil

Palaniappa Kalluri (transl. Pazhaniappa College) is a 2007 Indian Tamil-language drama film written and directed by R. Pavan and produced by Anbalaya Films. The film stars Naveen Chandra (credited as Pradeep), Arjumman Mughal, Madhu Shalini and Akshaya Rao in lead roles. It was released on 21 December 2007.

== Cast ==
- Pradeep as Parthi
- Arjumman Mughal as Priya
- Madhu Shalini as Malli
- Akshaya Rao as Madonna
- Ghajini as Dharani
- Ganja Karuppu
- Ganeshkar as Selva
- Rohini as Parthi's mother
- Shakeela as Chechi
- Pandu as Professor
- Chitra Lakshmanan as Music teacher
- Krishnamoorthy as Police officer
- Vijay Krishnaraj
- Prem Kumar
- Suruli Manohar

== Production ==
The film was first announced by Anbalaya Films in September 2004 under the title of Pasanga, Ponnunga, Oru College. Film Institute graduate R. Pavan was revealed to be the director, with R. P. Patnaik as composer and G. B. Krishna as cinematographer. Production delays meant that the film progressed slowly. Arjumman Mughal made her film debut, and Naveen Chandra (credited as Pradeep) made his Tamil debut. The film was largely shot at A. V. C. College in Mayiladuthurai.

== Soundtrack ==
Soundtrack was composed by R. P. Patnaik, in his second Tamil film after Jayam (2003). The song "Parangimalai" is based on his own song "Ameerpet" from Telugu film Eeswar while "En Meesai" is based on "Tiya Tiyani" from Telugu film Sreeram.

- "Parangimalai" – Silambarasan
- "Vayasu Pasangala" – Karthik
- "En Meesai Suriyan" – Mathangi
- "Pattam Poochi" – Tippu
- "Vaa Endral" – Tippu
- "Goyango" – Malathy
- "Wine Shopla" – R. P. Patnaik

== Release and reception ==
The film was released on 21 December 2007. S. R. Ashok Kumar of The Hindu opined that "Director Pavan should have burnt the midnight oil more to do the script, packing it with enough incidents with twist and turns to sustain audience interest. As it is his first film one can pardon him, but will the audience?" Malini Mannath from Chennai Online noted "the film, which seems like mindless entertainment during the first half, takes a more serious turn in the second, with a message weaved in" and that the story "depicts a typical college campus with characters and incidents that we have seen in many earlier campus films".

The film did not perform well commercially, with The Times of India calling it a "debacle" and News18 noting it was poorly publicised.
