= O Pushpa I Hate Tears =

2020 Indian bilingual Hindi-language comedy thriller film

- Theatrical release poster
- Directed by: Dinkar Kapoor
- Written by: Aadesh K. Arjun
- Produced by: Amulya Das; Sujata Das
- Starring: Krushna Abhishek; Arjumman Mughal; Anusmriti Sarkar; Karthik Jayaram
- Music by: Ramji Gulati
- Production company: Films@50
- Distributed by: Wavelength Studios
- Release date: 28 February 2020
- Running time: 127 minutes
- Country: India
- Languages: Hindi

O Pushpa I Hate Tears is a 2020 Indian Hindi-language comedy drama thriller film written and directed by Dinkar Kapoor. The film stars Krushna Abhishek, Arjumman Mughal, Anusmriti Sarkar, and Karthik Jayaram in the lead roles. Kannada actor Karthik Jayaram made his Bollywood acting debut through this film. The film title was loosely inspired from a dialogue by the actor Rajesh Khanna in the 1972 film Amar Prem. The film was initially scheduled for its theatrical release on 7 February 2020 but was later pushed to 28 February 2020 and was panned by critics.

== Cast ==
- Krushna Abhishek as Shyam
- Arjumman Mughal as Pushpa
- Karthik Jayaram as Aditya
- Anusmriti Sarkar as Teena
- Jimmy Moses as Lalu
- Pradeep Kabra as Kalu
- Anang Desai as Pushpa's father
- Akhilendra Mishra as Inspector Chaubley

== Soundtrack ==
O Pushpa I Hate Tears

Soundtrack album by Ramji Gulati
- Released: 7 February 2020
- Recorded: 2019
- Genre: Feature film soundtrack
- Length: 14:27
- Language: Hindi
- Label: Zee Music Company

The film's music was composed by with Ramji Gulati with lyrics written by Kunwar Juneja, Pahawa and Mack.

Track listing
| No. | Title | Lyrics | Singer(s) | Length |
|---|---|---|---|---|
| 1. | "O Pushpa" | Kunwar Juneja | Krishna Abhishek | 2:59 |
| 2. | "Saari Raat Peene Do" | Pahawa | Ramji Gulati | 3:17 |
| 3. | "Tu Hai Teri Aashiqui" | Kunwar Juneja | Shehzaad Ali, Aakanksha Sharma | 4:21 |
| 4. | "Love Bite" | Mack | Jyotica Tangri | 3:50 |
| Total length: | | | | 14:27 |
