= Pabitra Sarkar =

Indian Bengali linguist and educationist

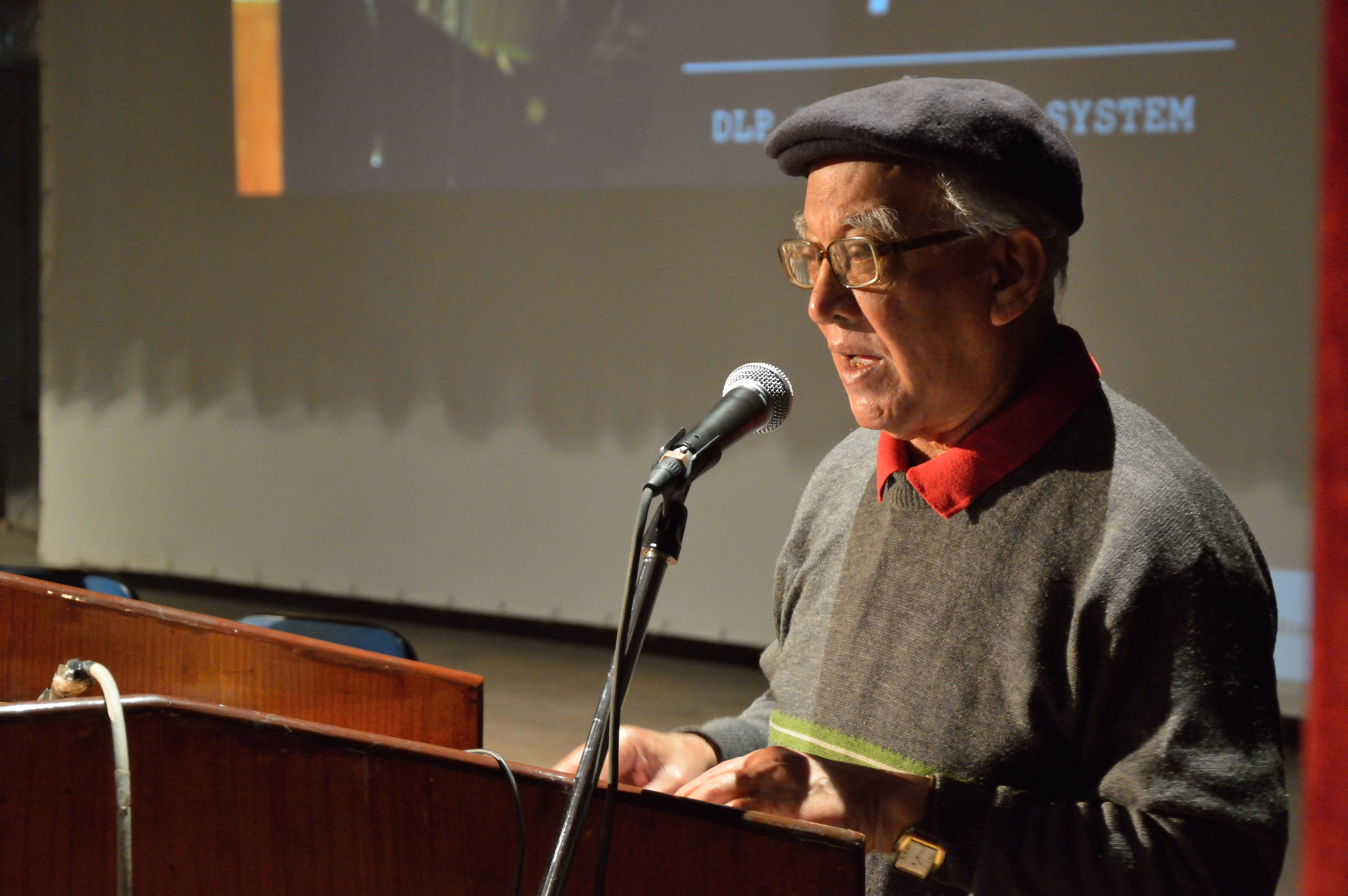
- Professor Sarkar in 2015
- Born: 28 March 1937 (age 89); Savar, Dhaka, British India.
- Education: Calcutta University; University of Chicago
- Occupations: Academic, Linguist, Writer, Theatre person
- Title: F
- Spouse: Maitreyi Bandyopadhyay
- Children: 2
- Awards: Order of the Rising Sun; Mother Teresa Lifetime Achievement Award
- Website: www.calcuttayellowpages.com/adver/108745.html

Pabitra Sarkar (born 28 March 1937) is an Indian Bengali linguist, writer, Literary critic, and academician. He is also a children's writer, Rabindra Sangeet singer and dramatist. He received the Vidyasagar Award given by the Paschimbanga Bangla Akademi in 2000 for writing proses, and the Indira Gandhi Award for National Integration. In 2019, he was honored with the title of the Order of the Rising Sun, Japan's third highest civilian honor.

Sarkar was the Vice-chancellor of Rabindra Bharati University from 1990 to 1997. He was also the president of Bangiya Sahitya Parishat, Bharatiya Bhasha Parishad, American Institute of Indian Studies and numerous other literary and cultural institutions throughout his career. Although retired from job, professor Sarkar still teaches at University of Calcutta and few other colleges, and is now vice-president of Paschimbanga Bangla Akademi, and the newly formed Society for Natural Language Technology and Research, West Bengal.

== Early life and education ==
Pabitra Sarkar was born on 28 March 1937 in a Mahishya family in then Dhaka District of British India, now in Bangladesh. After the independence and partition of the countr in 1947, he came to Calcutta, and completed his higher education in the city. He was one of the most brilliant and accomplished students of Calcutta University. He secured the highest rank in both the graduation and post-graduation examinations. After receiving his master's degree, he taught at Bangabasi College, Kolkata for some time. Later, from 1963 to 1969, he taught as a lecturer at Jadavpur University. In 1969, he went to the United States with a Fulbright Scholarship from the university. After receiving a master's degree from the University of Chicago, he studied linguistics and earned a Ph.D. He taught at the University of Minnesota for the last two years until 1975.

== Career ==
After returning to India, Sarkar joined Jadavpur University again as a professor. After his promotion, he held the post of vice-chancellor of Rabindra Bharati University for seven consecutive years from 1990 to 1997. Later he became the vice-chairman of West Bengal State Council of Higher Education. Professor Sarkar was in the one one-man committee of the West Bengal Government, which reintroduced English in primary school from Class 3 in 2000. He retired in 2003. Sarkar has written and edited more than hundred books in Bengali and English. He is closely associated with various literary and cultural institutions of the country.
