= Indumadhab Mallick =

Indian polymath (1869–1917)

- ইন্দুমাধব মল্লিক
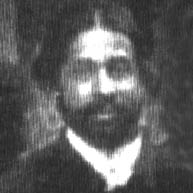
- Dr. Indumadhab Mallick
- Born: 4 December 1869; Guptipara, Hooghly, Bengal, British India
- Died: 8 May 1917 (aged 47); Calcutta, Bengal, British India
- Citizenship: British Indian
- Occupation: ·Inventor ·Entrepreneur ·Traveler

Indumadhab Mallick (Bengali: ইন্দুমাধব মল্লিক; 4 December 1869 – 8 May 1917) was a Bengali polymath philosopher, physicist, botanist, lawyer, physician, entrepreneur, collector, traveler, writer and social reformer. He is best known for inventing the ICMIC cooker and turning it into a commercial success.

== Early life ==
Indumadhab was born to Radhagobinda Mallick of Baidya family at Guptipara village in the Hooghly district of Bengal on 4 December 1869. His family was related to the Mallick family of Bhowanipore in Kolkata. He is the father of poet Upendra Mallick and grandfather of actor Ranjit Mallick. In 1891, Indumadhab completed his master's degree in philosophy. In 1892, he did masters in physics. He became a bachelor of law in 1894.

== Career ==
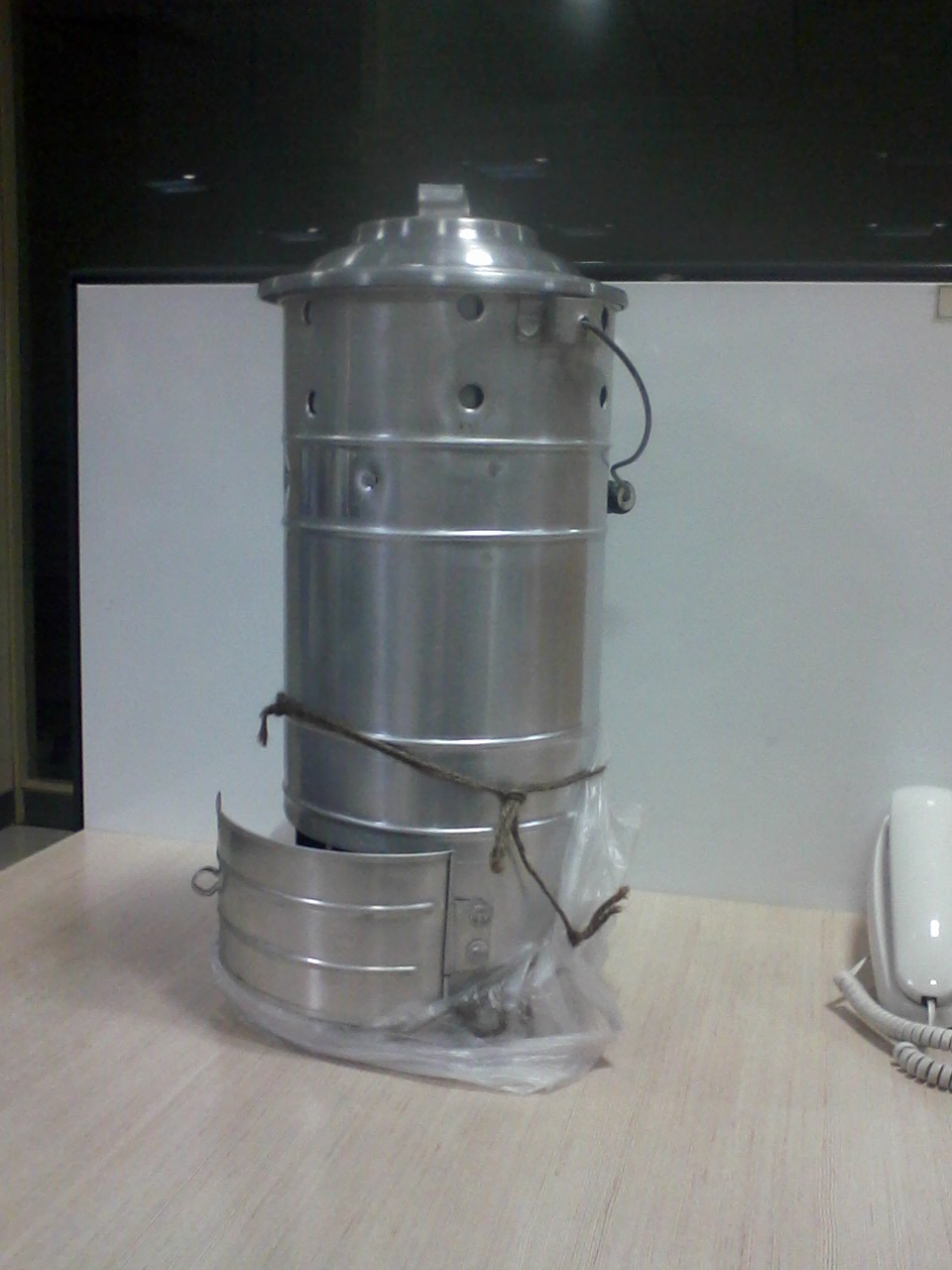
ICMIC Cooker

Indumadhab started his career as a lecturer in Bangabasi College in 1897. There he taught logic, philosophy, physics and chemistry. In 1898, he completed his master's degree in botany from Bangabasi College. A year later, he completed his master's degree in zoology and physiology. He left Bangabasi College in 1900. Then he started practice as a lawyer.

Between 1904 and 1905, Indumadhab traveled to Imperial China. The exact date of his travel is not known. According to researcher Narayan Sen, Indumadhab set out for China in February 1904 and his travel coincided with the Russo-Japanese War. Indumadhab sailed from Kolkata to Yangon in British Burma. From Yangon he sailed to Penang and from there to Port Klang in British Malaya.

In 1908, Indumadhab became an M.D. from University of Calcutta. He pioneered the autovaccine method of inoculation in India. He spent tireless effort in spreading the awareness on hygiene, health and diet in the society. He was also sympathetic to the nationalist cause. While testing the Alipore bomb in Deoghar, Ullaskar Dutta was critically injured. He was privately treated by Dr. Indumadhab Mallick.

In 1910, Indumadhab invented the steam cooker which became popular as ICMIC cooker. It was a special kind of cooking equipment where rice, pulses and vegetables could be cooked in steam, very fast. The compact arrangement and portability made it popular among bachelors and during trips where kitchen was not available. The idea of ICMIC cooker came to him by seeing the way food is cooked in the kitchens of Jagannath Temple.

== Publications ==
Indumadhab wrote two books on his travels to China and Britain.

- Chin Bhraman (1906)
- Bilat Bhraman
