= Vipul Roy =

Indian television and film actor

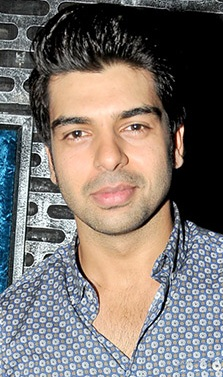
- Roy in 2015
- Born: Bhopal, Madhya Pradesh, India
- Occupation: Actor
- Years active: 2004 – present
- Known for: F.I.R.; Partners Trouble Ho Gayi Double
- Spouse: Melis Atici (m. 2022)

Vipul Roy is an Indian television and film actor. He is well known for his role of Bhola Pandit in SAB TV's F.I.R. He acted in the Punjabi feature film What the Jatt!!.

== Early life and education ==
Roy did his schooling from Sherwood College and according to an interview he received his first award for acting from Amitabh Bachchan for a play as a child. He was pursuing his Hotel Management from Ooty when he was selected amongst the 32 finalist from India for in the first season of India's Best Cinestars Ki Khoj in 2004.

== Personal life ==
In 2019, Roy got engaged to his girlfriend Melis Atici. They married on 20 February 2022.

== Career ==
Vipul Roy participated in the first season of India's Best Cinestars Ki Khoj. Later, he hosted Sa Re Ga Ma Pa Mega Challenge and become its first anchor from a non-singing background. He then went on to host Wheel Ghar Ghar Mein along with Manish Paul. He then had roles in fictional shows such as Tujko Hai Salaam Zindgi, and Chehra.

In 2013, after Aamir Ali left the show, Roy landed the lead role of Bhola Pandit in the show F.I.R. In 2014, he joined the cast of Jeanie Aur Juju.

In 2015, Roy played Sunny in Sahib Biwi Aur Boss. In 2016, he played the main lead in Dr. Madhumati On Duty as Mohan opposite Debina Bonnerjee. In 2017, he played the most popular role of his career as Sr.Inspector Aditya Dev in the series Partners Trouble Ho Gayi Double. In 2019, he appeared in &TV's Naye Shaadi Ke Siyape as Bunty. He acted in ALT Balaji's web series, Booo Sabki Phategi as Veer along with Shefali Jariwala.

== Filmography ==
=== Television ===
| Year | Show | Role | Notes | Ref(s) |
|---|---|---|---|---|
| 2004 | India's Best Cinestars Ki Khoj | Contestant | Finalist | |
| 2007–2008 | Tujko Hai Salaam Zindgi | Gaurav | | |
| 2009 | Sa Re Ga Ma Pa Mega Challenge | Presenter | Along with Manish Paul | |
| 2009–2013 | Wheel Ghar Ghar Mein | Presenter | | |
| 2013 | Adaalat | Suraj Kochar | Episode 195 | |
| 2013–2014 | F.I.R. | Sr. Inspector Bhola Pandit | | |
| 2015–2016 | Sahib Biwi Aur Boss | Sandeep Kumar/Sunny | | |
| 2016 | Dr. Madhumati On Duty | Dr. Mohan | | |
| 2017–2018 | Partners Trouble Ho Gayi Double | Sr. Inspector Aditya Dev | | |
| 2019 | Naye Shaadi Ke Siyape | Bunty | | |
| 2020 | Viral With Vipul | Himself | | |

=== Film ===
| Year | Title | Role | Refs |
|---|---|---|---|
| 2022 | Bachchhan Paandey | Anchor | |

=== Web ===
| Year | Title | Role | Platform | Refs |
|---|---|---|---|---|
| 2019 | Booo Sabki Phategi | Veer | ALT Balaji | |
| 2022 | Black Widows | Susmita's husband | ZEE5 | |
