= Partners Trouble Ho Gayi Double =

- Genre: Comedy drama
- Created by: Paritosh Painter
- Written by: Paritosh Painter; Gopal Kulkarni; Amit Senchoudhary; Rajesh Chawla; Aayush Agrawal
- Starring: See below
- Opening theme: Partners theme song
- Country of origin: India
- Original language: Hindi
- No. of seasons: 1
- No. of episodes: 220

Production
- Executive producer: Aayush Agrawal
- Producer: Paritosh Painter
- Camera setup: Multiple cameras
- Running time: 21 minutes
- Production company: Ideas Entertainment

Original release
- Network: SAB TV
- Release: 28 November 2017 – 1 October 2018

Partners (also known as Partners Trouble Ho Gayi Double) is an Indian buddy cop-comedy series. The series was produced by Paritosh Painter. The show premiered on SAB TV on 28 November 2017.

== Plot ==
Aditya Dev and Manav A Desai are two policemen who work under Commissioner Gogol Chatterjee. They are very different but slowly start to become good friends. Dev falls in love with Ayesha Nadkarni, who is a lawyer and Desai is in love with Ayesha's younger sister Dolly Nadkarni. They both live with Neena Nadkarni, their mother, a widow, and an old friend of Chatterjee. The story revolves around these characters and the different cases the policemen solve, with a focus on the comedic and entertaining situations which ensue. Later both men fight over Gogol's niece, Chamko

== Cast ==
=== Main ===
- Johnny Lever as
  - Commissioner Gogol Chatterjee, Neena's love interest and Khogol and Phogol's twin brother (2017–2018)
  - Khabri Khogol Chatterjee, police informer and Gogol and Phogol's twin brother Shanno's love interest (2017–2018)
  - Commissioner Phogol Chatterjee, Gogol and Khogol's twin brother (2018)
- Vipul Roy as Senior Inspector Aditya Dev, Ayesha and Chamko's love interest (2017–2018)
- Kiku Sharda as Senior Inspector Manav A. Desai, Dolly and Sundari's love interest (2017–2018)
- Kishwer Merchant as Ayesha Nadkarni, Aditya's love interest (2017–2018)
- Shweta Gulati as Dolly Nadkarni, Manav's love interest (2017-2018)
- Ashwini Kalsekar as Neena Nadkarni, Ayesha and Dolly's mother, Gogol's love interest (2017-2018)
- Neha Pendse as Chamko, Gogol's niece. (2018)

=== Recurring ===
- Mahira Sharma as Sonia, Daughter of a dreaded Don
- Jayesh Thakkar as Sub Inspector P. K. Bose
- Asrani as Director General of Police Jagmohan Chhabria, Manav's brother-in-law
- Sulbha Jadhav as Constable Sundari
- Delnaaz Irani as Shanno
- Yashkant Sharma as Constable Deepak kumar Imartilal Gopla a.k.a. DIG
- Deepak as various characters

=== Guest ===
- Chetan Hansraj as Manjeet Singh
- Shreyas Talpade as Himself
- Manini Mishra as Sushmita
- Vindhya Tiwari as Shagun
- Karan Thakur as Rahul
- Balwinder Singh Suri as Shonty Chadda, the secretary of Mayur Society/ Mr.P
- Melanie Pais as Reema as Sports teacher
- Tushar Kapadia as Ramu Joshi
- Suyyash Rai as Raju Hatela
- Umesh Bajpai as Mr.Kuteja
- Barkha Sengupta as Shikha
- Vrajesh Hirjee as Nagesh
- Tanaaz Irani as Kiara
- Mahira Sharma as Sonia
- Abhishek Sharma as Varun Malhotra and Briganza
- Pawan Singh as Birbal
- Romit Raj as Vikram
- Nasirr Khan as Sanki Pathan
- Resham Tipnis as Bulbul
- Sanjay Narvekar as Chhota Bunty
- Ayub Khan as Don Harsh Singhania
- Ram Awana as Jagga

== See also ==
- List of Hindi comedy shows
