= Umformung: The Transformation =

- Directed by: Sudeep Ranjan Sarkar
- Produced by: Rita Jhawar
- Starring: Akshaya Rao; Sanjay Bhatia
- Music by: Sanjib Sarkar
- Distributed by: Nez Moving Pixels
- Release date: 26 August 2016
- Running time: 120 minutes
- Country: India
- Language: Hindi

Umformung: The Transformation is a Hindi-language Indian film that uses karma as the central theme of the story, directed by Sudeep Ranjan Sarkar. Produced by Nez Moving Pixels, Initially the shot completed in the locations of Kolkata before the unit moved on to Dharamshala. Umformung movie preview happened in front of 30 Buddhist monks and 40 sex workers in Kolkata on 16 July 2016, Umformung' is a story of a monk and a sex workers, whose search for truth brings him to the city and unimaginable consequences, Their paths collide leading them to a mountain journey, The film garnered nineteen national and international awards and great endorsements from senior Buddhist monks. It was released in India in 2016.

== Cast ==
- Akshaya Rao
- Sushil Bhosale
- Atul Mahajan
- Rohit Kokade
- Sanjay Bhatia
- Sanjita
