= Uliyin Osai =

- Theatrical release poster
- Directed by: Ilavenil
- Screenplay by: Ilavenil
- Based on: Sarapallam Chamundi by M. Karunanidhi
- Produced by: S. P. Murugesan
- Starring: Vineeth; Keerthi Chawla; Akshaya
- Cinematography: B. Kannan
- Edited by: Suresh Urs
- Music by: Ilaiyaraaja
- Production company: Nandini Arts
- Release date: 4 July 2008
- Country: India
- Language: Tamil

Uliyin Osai (transl. The Sound of Chisel) is a 2008 Indian Tamil-language historical romance film written by Ilavenil in his directorial debut. It is based on M. Karunanidhi's short Sarapallam Chamundi, which was first published in 1964 in Murasoli. The film stars Vineeth, Keerthi Chawla and Akshaya, while Sarath Babu, Manorama, Kovai Sarala, and Ganja Karuppu play supporting roles. The soundtrack album and background score were composed by Ilaiyaraaja with cinematography by B. Kannan and editing by Suresh Urs. The film was released on 4 July 2008.

== Plot ==
The story is set in 1005 AD. Raja Raja Chola and his son Rajendra Chola are benevolent rulers of the Chola dynasty. As a mark of respect to the gods, they want to build a temple in Thanjavur. They appoint the master sculptor Iniyan, a handsome young man who is also a good dancer, to do the sculpture work for the big temple. However, Iniyan finds the palace 'narthaki' Muthunagai not up to the mark and is unable to find the right girl to pose as the model for his sculpture work. Meanwhile, he meets a village girl Chamundi, who is said to be the granddaughter of a shepherd woman Azhagi, who is not only beautiful but has an hourglass-like figure and dances like a dream. Iniyan slowly falls in love with his 'model', and when he expresses his love for her, she spurns it as she is the Queen herself. An absolutely shattered sculptor in a moment of remorse does something which is shocking and is the real twist in the tale.

== Cast ==
- Vineeth as Iniyan
- Keerthi Chawla as Chamundi
- Akshaya as Muthunagai
- Sarath Babu as Raja Raja Chola I
- Manorama as Azhagi
- Kovai Sarala as Sokki
- Ganja Karuppu as Soodamani
- Thalaivasal Vijay as Manikandan
- Bala Singh as Brammarayar
- Suja Varunee

== Soundtrack ==
The soundtrack was composed by Ilaiyaraaja.

Song	Singers	Lyrics	Length
"Kaalathai Vendra"	Bhavatharini, Sriram Parthasarathy	Na. Muthukumar	04:44
"Pularkindra Pozhuthu"	Sriram Parthasarathy, Ilaiyaraaja	Mu. Metha	05:11
"Kallai Irunthen"	Dhanya, Sriram Parthasarathy	Palani Bharathi	05:10
"Azhagai"	Tippu, Shweta Mohan	Snehan	04:28
"Alaiyellam Chozhavala"	Ilaiyaraaja, Saindhavi, Rita, Madhu Balakrishnan	Kamakodiyan	05:02
"Abhinayam Kaatugindra"	Bombay Jayashree, Sudha Raghunathan	Vaali	06:02
"Aganthaiyil Aadavatha"	Sriram Parthasarathy, Ilaiyaraaja	Muthulingam	04:51

== Reception ==
Pavithra Srinivasan of Rediff wrote "[..] the biggest flaw is the script itself, which based on a tiny story, has been stretched to two-and-a-half hours". The film won three Tamil Nadu State Film Awards: Best Dialogue Writer (Karunanidhi), Best Comedian (Kovai Sarala) and Best Choreographer (K. Sivasankar).
