= Masoom (2014 film) =

- Film poster
- Directed by: Partha Sarathi Joarder
- Produced by: Pankaj Agarwal and PB Films
- Starring: Sabyasachi Chakraborty, Rittika Sen, Akash Chowdhury, Mnajushree Ganguly
- Music by: Sanjib Sarkar
- Production company: Octave Studio Kolkata
- Distributed by: PB Films
- Release date: 2014
- Running time: 120 minutes
- Country: India

Masoom (transl. Innocent) is a 2014 Indian Bengali-language film.

== Synopsis ==
The story is about an innocent teenage couple who grow a very good friendship between them. Belonging to a vital period of their time, this is to say adolescence, just with a beckon of sex, their life changes. Actually, the story wants to hit the core area of the education system of West Bengal. There is a very bad tendency amongst the parents that they try to hide things from the eyes of their children instead of explaining those. As a result of that, the curiosity plays an important role behind their sub conscious minds. Sometimes in adolescence, without getting proper explanation and driven by the thoughts at the back of their minds, they commit many mistakes.

== Cast ==
- Rittika Sen
- Akash Chowdhury
- Sabyasachi Chakraborty
- Manjushree Ganguly
- Akash Singh

== Music ==
The music for the film was written by Sanjib Sarkar and sung by Sanchita Bhattacharya, Rupam Islam, Sanjib Sarkar, Madhuri Dey and Mahalakshmi Iyer.

== Soundtrack ==
No.	Title	Singer(s)	Length
1.	"Halka Nesha Halka"	Sanjib Sarkar & Madhuri Dey	5:03
2.	"Aj Theke Tumi"	Sanchita & Prasenjit	4:00

== Awards ==
Award	Category	Artist	Location	Year	Result
Anandalok Puraskar	Best Music	Sanjib Sarkar	Kolkata	2014	Won
