= Sa Re Ga Ma Pa Li'l Champs International =

- Created by: Rajeev Arora; Abhishek Dwivedi
- Directed by: Gyan Sahay
- Presented by: Aditya Narayan
- Starring: Suresh Wadkar; Sonu Nigam
- Country of origin: India

Production
- Running time: 52 minutes

Original release
- Network: Zee TV
- Release: 19 October 2007 – 1 March 2008

Related
- Sa Re Ga Ma Pa L'il Champs

Sa Re Ga Ma Pa L'il Champs International is an Indian televised children's singing competition announced by Sa Re Ga Ma Pa Challenge 2007 host, Aditya Narayan, on 28 July 2007. The season began on 19 October 2007 with 28 contestants. The show was broadcast on Fridays, Saturdays and Sundays. Anamika Choudhari won this competition on 1 March 2008. It is the second instalment of the "Sa Re Ga Ma Pa L'il Champs" series and the fifth public voting competition in the "Sa Re Ga Ma Pa" series. Chronologically, the show was preceded by Sa Re Ga Ma Pa Challenge 2007.

Narayan mentioned that children aged 6–14 worldwide could send recordings of their songs on a CD if they wished to participate in the competition. Furthermore, on 13 October 2007, Narayan also added that Pritam and Sonu Nigam would be the judges of the show. However, Pritam was later replaced by Suresh Wadkar.

== Regional auditions phase ==
=== Locations ===
The auditions were held in the following cities in India:

- Chandigarh: – 22 September
- Ahmedabad: – 28 September
- Delhi: – 23 September
- Kolkata: – 23 September
- Mumbai: – 29 September

International auditions took place in the United Kingdom, Dubai, USA, South Africa, Malaysia, Pakistan, New Zealand, Singapore, Fiji, Kenya, Australia, Israel and Hong Kong.

Most participants were from India. No foreign contestants reached the finals

=== Judges ===
- Sonu Nigam
- Suresh Wadkar

Contestants
Name	City/State	Country	Status	Status Date	Episode Number	Wildcard Entry/2nd Elimination
Anamika Choudhari	Mariani, Assam	India	Winner	1 March 2008	Episode 40	
Rohanpreet Singh	Patiala, Punjab	India	1st runner-up	1 March 2008	Episode 40	
Tanmay Chaturvedi	Lucknow, Uttar Pradesh	India	2nd runner-up	1 March 2008	Episode 40	
Aamir Hafeez	Bhopal, Madhya Pradesh	India	3rd runner-up	15 February 2008	Episode 34	
Vasundhara Raturi	Delhi	India	4th runner-up	8 February 2008	Episode 32	
Vaishali Raikwar	Bhopal, Madhya Pradesh	India	Voted out	~~1 December 2007~~	~~Episode 14~~	25 Jan 2008/Epi. 29
Smita Nandi	Agartala, Tripura	India	Voted out	18 January 2008	Episode 27	
Vibhor Parashar	Delhi	India	Voted out	12 January 2008	Episode 25	
Rohit Shyam Raut	Nagpur, Maharashtra	India	Voted out	4 January 2008	Episode 23	
Paritosh Pande	Gaziabad, Uttar Pradesh	India	Voted out	21 December 2007	Episode 21	
Sahil Solanki	Hissar, Haryana	India	Voted out	~~14 December 2007~~	~~Episode 6~~	1 Dec 2007/Epi. 14
Loria Dhoshi	Jaipur, Rajasthan	India	Voted out	8 December 2007	Episode 16	
Shahzaad Ali	Bikaner, Rajasthan	India	Voted out	3 November 2007	Episode 17	
Sagar Padke	Mumbai, Maharashtra	India	Voted out	30 November 2007	Episode 13	
Sayon Sen	New Delhi	India	Voted out	17 November 2007	Episode 10	
Barbie Rajput with Ankesh Godbole	Mandi, Himachal Pradesh	India	Voted out	10 November 2007	Episode 8	
Arghya Ramnath Naik	Muscat	Oman	Voted out	28 October 2007	Episode 5	
Harsh Kapoor	Allahabad, Uttar Pradesh	India	Voted out	27 October 2007	Episode 4	
Shreya Nayak	Mumbai, Maharashtra	India	Voted out	27 October 2007	Episode 4	
Shreya Tripathi	Sitrah	Bahrain	Voted out	27 October 2007	Episode 4	
Sukanya Gupta	Delhi	India	Voted out	27 October 2007	Episode 4	
Utkarsha Telang	Indor, Madhya Pradesh	India	Voted out	27 October 2007	Episode 4	
Aamna Waheed (Spelling Correction)	England	United Kingdom	Voted out	26 October 2007	Episode 3	
Maithali Shome	Johannesburg	South Africa	Voted out	26 October 2007	Episode 3	
Rupaali	Suva	Fiji	Voted out	26 October 2007	Episode 3	
Surbhi Rajput	Kota, Rajasthan	India	Voted out	26 October 2007	Episode 3	
Veda Narulkar	Mumbai, Maharashtra	India	Voted out	26 October 2007	Episode 3	
Anshula Kumar	Sydney	Australia	Voted out	19 October 2007	Episode 2	
Monalisa Roy	Kuala Lumpur	Malaysia	Voted out	19 October 2007	Episode 2	
Shruti Khandai	California	United States	Voted out	19 October 2007	Episode 2	
Vibhav Gautam	Doha	Qatar	Voted out	19 October 2007	Episode 2	
Yash Kansara	N/A	United States	Voted out	19 October 2007	Grand Finale	

== Episode themes ==
Just as was done in previous Sa Re Ga Ma Pa shows, the idea of themes is used to determine the contestants' versatility and ability to sing different genres.

- Episode 1 – Week 1 (Fri, 19 October) – Introduction to Indian Contestants
- Episode 2 – Week 1 (Sat, 20 October) – Introduction to Foreign Contestants
- Episode 3 – Week 2 (Fri, 26 October) – Contestants' Choice
- Episode 4 – Week 2 (Sat, 27 October) – Contestants' Choice
- Episode 5 – Week 3
- Episode 6 – Week 3 (Sat, 3 November) – "Masti and Dhamaal" Songs
- Episode 7 – Week 4 (Fri, 9 November) – Diwali Special
- Episode 8 – Week 4 (Sat, 10 November) – Rock and Roll Songs
- Episode 9 – Week 5 (Fri, 16 November) – Children's Day Special
- Episode 10 – Week 5 (Sat, 17 November) – Comedy Special
- Episode 11 – Week 6 (Fri, 23 November) – Asha Bhonsle's Songs
- Episode 12 – Week 6 (Sat, 24 November)
- Episode 13 – Week 7 (Fri, 30 November) – Contestant's Favorite Songs
- Episode 14 – Week 7 (Sat, 1 December) – Retro Theme
- Episode 15 – Week 8 (Fri, 7 December) – Hungama Songs
- Episode 16 – Week 8 (Sat, 8 December) – Aamir Khan's Songs
- Episode 17 – Week 9 (Fri, 14 December) –
- Episode 18 – Week 9 (Sat, 15 December) –
- Episode 19 – Week 10 (Fri, 21 December) – Balle Balle Punjabi Songs
- Episode 20 – Week 10 (Sat, 22 December) – Hits of Karisma Kapoor
- Episode 21 – Week 11 (Fri, 28 December) – Sonu Nigam's Songs
- Episode 22 – Week 11 (Sat, 29 December) – Disco Special
- Episode 23 – Week 12 (Fri, 4 January) – Beach Special
- Episode 24 – Week 12 (Sat, 5 January) – Parent's Special
- Episode 25 – Week 13 (Fri, 11 January) – Arabic Music
- Episode 26 – Week 13 (Sat, 12 January) – Mela Special
- Episode 27 – Week 14 (Fri, 18 January) – Sufi Songs
- Episode 28 – Week 14 (Sat, 19 January) – Hits of Arshad Warsi/Ayesha Takia
- Episode 29 – Week 15 (Fri, 25 January) – Train Songs
- Episode 30 – Week 15 (Sat, 26 January) – Patriotic Songs
- Episode 31 – Week 16 (Fri, 1 February) – Suresh Wadkar's Songs
- Episode 32 – Week 16 (Sat, 2 February) – New Songs of 2007 & Romantic Songs
- Episode 33 – Week 17 (Fri, 8 February) – Devotional Songs
- Episode 34 – Week 17 (Sat, 9 February) – Chaand & Bhoot Songs
- Episode 35 – Week 18 (Fri, 15 February) – Classical Songs
- Episode 36 – Week 18 (Sat, 16 February) – Hits of Kajol/Ajay Devgan

== Celebrity guests ==
- Week 3 (2 November) – Anand Raj Anand
- Week 4 (9 November) – Vishal–Shekhar
- Week 5 (16 November) – Amrita-Nagin
- Week 6 (23 November 24 November) – Asha Bhonsle (both days)
- Week 7 (1 December) – Soha Ali Khan
- Week 8 (7 December) – Usha Uthup
- Week 8 (8 December) – Aamir Khan
- Week 9 (14 December 15 December) – Alka Yagnik (both days)
- Week 10 (21 December) – Richa Sharma
- Week 10 (22 December) – Karisma Kapoor
- Week 11 (28 December) – Agam Kumar Nigam
- Week 11 (29 December) – Mithun Chakraborty, Amrita Rao, Nikhil Dwivedi
- Week 12 (5 January) – Deepa Narayan
- Week 13 (11 January) – Nagesh Kukunoor, Shreyas Talpade, Salim–Sulaiman
- Week 14 (18 January) – Rajpal Yadav
- Week 14 (19 January) – Ayesha Takia, Arshad Warsi
- Week 15 (26 January) – Bipasha Basu
- Week 16 (1 February) – Vishal Bhardwaj
- Week 16 (2 February) – Kunal Khemu, Sameer Tandon
- Week 17 (9 February) – Raju Shrivastav
- Week 18 (15 February) – Amjad Ali Khan
- Week 18 (16 February]) – Kajol, Ajay Devgan

Grand Finale: (1 March) Kajol and Ajay Devgan
