= Baishnab Charan Parida =

Indian politician (1941–2018)

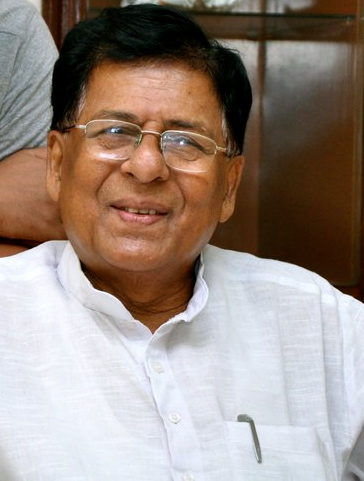

MP of Rajya Sabha for Odisha
- In office 2 July 2010 – 1 July 2016

Personal details
- Born: 15 February 1941 Jajpur, Odisha
- Died: 22 November 2018 (aged 77)
- Party: BJD
- Other political affiliations: CPI (1960-1992), Congress, (1993-1998), Samajwadi Party (1999-2008)
- Spouse: Swarnalata Parida
- Children: Lunita Barik, Soumik Parida

Baishnab Charan Parida (15 February 1941 – 22 November 2018), was a BJD politician, writer and social activist. He was a Member of Rajya Sabha (the upper house of India's Parliament) and represented Odisha. Socialism and secularism are his main mantras. He was elected to Rajya Sabha in July 2010 and his term ended on 1 July 2016. He fought to bring the Odisha Official Language Act, 1954.

== Early life ==
He was born on 15 February 1941 in Srirampur, P.S. Mangalpur of Jajpur district, Odisha. His father Jagbandhu Parida was a worker in jute mill in Kolkata and a folk singer and his mother Sulochana Parida was a housewife. His early School education was at Mangalpur Primary School. He was admitted to Mahtab High School at Mangalpur. He was suffering from cancer and under treatment.

== Life in Kolkata ==
After his matriculation, he moved to Kolkata to continue his higher studies as his father was working there. He completed his Graduation in Kolkata from Bangabasi College and MA In Political Science from the University of Calcutta. Later he completed his M.Phil. from Moscow University.

He was a member of Communist Party of India (CPI) from 1960 to 1992. A great follower of Karl Marx and his ideology, he slowly and steadily got involved in trade union and labour movement in West Bengal. In 1964 he was elected as member of Executive Committee of West Bengal Students Federation. Before that in 1963 he established West Bengal Oriya Students Association and in 1965 established West Bengal Oriya Citizen Council at Kolkata. In 1965 he formed Soviet Land (Oriya Editor) as a member of its editorial board. He continued as a member until 1975. He married Swarna Lata Parida on 3 March 1972.

== Life in Moscow ==
In 1974 Baishnab Parida moved to Moscow with his family for a special assignment for Indo-Soviet coordination. He stayed there until 1989. During his stay in Russia he held several positions. He was the correspondent of RIA Novosti from 1984 to 1989. He was elected as General Secretary of Indian Association in 1988. During that time he was special correspondent of the Samaja [Oriya Daily] and Eastern Media for East European countries.

== 1989 - Return to Odisha ==
After fifteen years in Moscow he returned to Odisha. A Marxist and socialist at heart, he had to leave CPI due to some differences on application of Marxist ideology in Indian reality. During his stay in Moscow he read literature on Mohandas K. Gandhi and Ambedkar, slowly and steadily he was attracted towards Gandhian Philosophy and Lohia's ideology. And eventually in 1993 he joined Indian National Congress. Until 1998 he was in Congress but due to his differences with the state party leadership he left congress and joined Samajwadi Party in 1999 as its State President. He was in Samajwadi party until he resigned in 2008. In 2008 he joined BJD.

== Books ==
(i) Caste System in India, (ii) S.A. Dange and Trade Union Movement in India, (iii) Octopus of Corruption, (iv) Political Economy and (v) Jharkhand Movement and the Political Aspirations behind it; translated 31 Russian Classics including Maxim Gorky's 'Mother', Dostoevsky and Chekhov's novels and stories, Leo Tolstoy's Father Sergei and other novels, Pushkin's Captain's daughter; four volumes of Karl Marx, Friedrich Engels' works; theoretical and political treaties of Plekhanov and Vladimir Lenin and many children's books into Oriya; edited books translated by many prominent Oriya writers, translated the 'Matir Manish' of Kalindi Charan Panigrahi, noted Oriya writer and other 28 best Oriya stories into Russian as a co-translator; published Pratinidhi (Oriya fortnightly) from Kolkata, 1963–69; contributed regularly for articles, journals and newspapers, has written numerous poems.

He died due to cancer on 22nd Nov 2018.

== Auxiliary info ==
1. Spokesperson, Biju Janata Dal
2. Orissa State President, Samajwadi Party, 1999–2008
3. General Secretary, (i) Orissa Pradesh Congress State Election Campaign Committee, 1995 and (ii) Indian Association of the then Soviet Union, 1988
4. Spokesman, Orissa Pradesh Congress Committee; Member, (i) Executive Committee of West Bengal Students Federation, 1965 and (ii) Editorial Board of Soviet Land (Oriya edition), 1965–74
5. In-charge of Moscow Committee of Communist Party of India (C.P.I.) 1975-89
6. Vice-President, Rural Workers Union of Orissa; Founder (i) West Bengal Oriya Students Association, 1963, (ii) West Bengal Oriya Citizens Council, Kolkata, 1965, (iii) New Thinking Forum, 1990, (iv) Forum against Corruption and Criminalization of Politics, 1996 and (v) Orissa Social Justice Forum, 1998
7. Special Correspondent, Samaja, leading Oriya Daily and Eastern Media for East European Countries, 1976–89, Correspondent, Novosti Press Agency, Moscow, 1984–89; Editor, Utkal Samaj, Oriya Daily, 1993–95
