= Bangabasi College =

College in Kolkata, India

Coordinates: 22.5693°N 88.3683°E

- Motto: प्रणिप्रातेन परिप्रशनेन सेवया
- Motto in English: Earn Education & Serve the Humanitarian
- Type: Public
- Established: 27 November 1887; 138 years ago
- Founder: Girish Chandra Bose
- Academic affiliations: University of Calcutta
- President: Ashok Kumar Deb
- Principal: Himadri Bhattacharyya Chakrabarty
- Students: 2570 + 410 (self-funded)
- Undergraduates: 2550
- Postgraduates: 20
- Location: 19, Rajkumar Chakraborty Sarani, Sealdah, Kolkata, West Bengal, 700009, India
- Campus: Urban, 0.60 acres (0.24 ha)
- Language: English and Bengali
- Website: bangabasi.ac.in

Bangabasi College is a Kolkata-based liberal arts, commerce and sciences college. It offers undergraduate and postgraduate courses of the University of Calcutta. It was founded by Girish Chandra Bose, an educationist, social reformer and agriculturist, in 1887. It was the first nationalist college. It played a major role in the Civil Disobedience Movement of 1930 and the self-sacrifice of Shri Jatindranath Das, an undergraduate student of the college. The college celebrated its 125th anniversary from November 2011 to October 2012. It has been accredited by the National Assessment and Accreditation Council of India (NAAC) with "B++" certificate.

== History ==
Acharya Girish Chandra Bose founded an institution, named Bangabasi School, in a rented house in Bowbazar Street with six teachers and twelve students in the year 1885. Two years later, the college was established with private management, under the inspiration and guidance of Ishwar Chandra Vidyasagar. It started with F.A. course and slowly obtained affiliation for the B.A., B.L. and M.A. courses to meet the requirements of the college.

In 1930. the college moved into its present premises at 19, Scott Lane (now Raj Kumar Chakraborty Sarani). Honours course in various subjects were introduced. During the World War II another branch of the college was established in Kushtia (now in Bangladesh) in 1942, as the people of Kolkata were troubled by the bombing by Japanese troops. After the World War II it was closed. After Independence in 1947, the college started to see receive huge admissions and thus it created extra-pressure on the existing infrastructure and system. To cope up with the demand, college was divided in morning and evening sections and Acharya Girish Chandra Bose started a new evening section only for commerce. Later in 1964, it emerged as Bangabasi College of Commerce (renamed as Acharya Girish Chandra Bose College in 2005).

Through phase reduction scheme of the University Grants Commission (UGC), the shifts were separated and two new colleges, i.e. Bangabasi Morning College and Bangabasi Evening College emerged in the same building and Bangabasi College of Commerce in a separate building on 11 April 1965. With this, four colleges came up: Bangabasi College, Bangabasi Morning College, Bangabasi Evening College and Bangabasi College of Commerce. In 1979 Bangabasi College opened its own Commerce Department, and also became co-ed.

== Courses ==
Courses listed below are undergraduate, except zoology. Only zoology department has both undergraduate and postgraduate courses.

=== Language and Literature ===
- Bengali
- English
- Hindi
- Sanskrit

=== Social Science ===
- Economics
- Education
- Geography
- History
- Philosophy
- Political Science
- Psychology
- Sociology

=== Commerce ===
- Commerce

=== Pure Science ===
- Chemistry
- Computer Science
- Mathematics
- Physics
- Statistics

=== Biological Science ===
- Anthropology
- Botany
- Zoology
- Environmental Studies

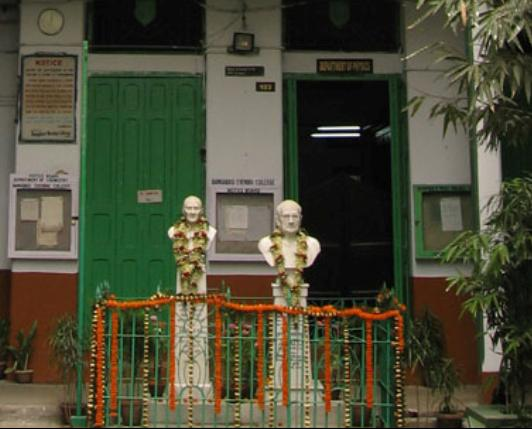
Late Acharya Girish Chandra Bose memorial

== Postgraduate studies ==
Postgraduate studies started in Zoology in 2005, under the semester system (CBCS), Department of Zoology, University of Calcutta.

Recently, it was acknowledged by the Department of Science and Technology, by sanctioning a grants-in-aid to the extent of Rs 20,00,000 for procuring modern equipment and adequate software support.

== Timeline ==
Department timeline
Year	Department	Note
1885	Mathematics	Honours course in 1940
1885	Philosophy	Honours course in 1944
1885	Physics	Honours course in 1950
1910	Economics	Honours course in 1950
1930	History	Honours course in 2000
1934	English	
1934	Sanskrit	
1936	Anthropology	Degree General course started in 1950 and Honours course in 1978
1939	Botany	Started with intermediate, Degree and Masters Course, but later discontinued. Honours course started in 1995
1944	Bengali	Supported the nationalist movement for independence
1950	Chemistry	
1955	Zoology	MSc started in 2005
1957	Political Science	
1965	Hindi	Minor department with only one full-time faculty member
1979	Commerce	Own commerce department
1996	Computer Science	Honours course in 2003
2003	Geography	
2005	Sociology	Honours course in 2008
2006	Psychology	As a subsidiary subject in 2006 and in 2007
2007	Education	Newest department

== Facilities ==
Facilities provided in the college:

=== Student service cell ===
- Student support cell
- Placement cell
- Counselling cell
- Women's cell
- Anti-ragging cell
- Grievance redressal cell
- Equal opportunity cell

=== Academic ===
- Laboratories
- Internet and Wi-Fi
- Educational tours
- Scholarships

== Other activities ==
Other activities include:

- NCC
- Sports and Games
- Students fair
- Cultural activities
- Computer skill development
- Self defense

== Notable alumni ==
The alumni of Bangabasi College have achieved prominence in various fields. Following is the list of notable alumni of this college.

- Chitta Basu, film director of Bengal during the sixties
- Prabodh Kumar Bhowmick, Indian academic, author and anthropologist
- Salil Chowdhury, music composer
- Basanta Kumar Das, Pakistani federal minister.
- Jatindra Nath Das, Indian independence activist, revolutionary and martyr.
- Sudhi Ranjan Das, Chief Justice of India
- Bishnu Dey, poet; winner of Jnanpith Award
- Tushar Kanti Ghosh, recipient of Padma Bhushan, former editor, Amrita Bazar Patrika
- Pankaj Gupta, MBE, sports administrator
- Kansari Halder, Indian politician
- Baby Islam, Indian and Bangladeshi cinematographer and film director
- Hare Krishna Konar, Indian independence activist, politician
- A. T. Kovoor, professor, rationalist
- Swami Lokeshwarananda, monk of the Ramakrishna Mission
- Chittabrata Majumdar, general secretary of CITU
- Sreela Majumdar, actress
- Indumadhab Mallick, Indian polymath who invented the ICMIC cooker
- Anantahari Mitra, Indian freedom fighter and martyr
- Ashesh Prosad Mitra, Fellow of the Royal Society, former director general, CSIR
- Narendranath Mitra, writer
- Bimal Mukherjee, globe-trotter on bicycle
- Subrata Mukherjee, politician, Minister
- Baishnab Charan Parida, politician, writer and social activist
- Sharat Kumar Roy, Indian American Geologist, the first person of Indian origin to go in an expedition to North Pole
- Chittaranjan Saha, Bangladeshi educationist, was awarded Ekushey Padak
- Amal Kumar Sarkar, chief justice of India
- Benudhar Sharma, recipient of Padma Bhushan and Sahitya Akademi Award, President of Assam Sahitya Sabha
- Swami Yatiswarananda, vice-president of Ramakrishna Order whose headquarter is in Belur Math

== Notable faculty ==
- Pabitra Sarkar

== See also ==
- Bangabasi Morning College
- Bangabasi Evening College
- Bangabasi College of Commerce
