= Nishan (1978 film) =

1978 Bengali film

- Directed by: S.S. Balan
- Starring: Uttam Kumar; Arati Bhattacharya; Nazir Hussain; Shekhar Chatterjee; Sulochana Chatterjee
- Cinematography: MC Sekar
- Music by: Shyamal Mitra
- Production company: Gemini Production Circuit Pvt. Ltd.
- Release date: 1978
- Country: India
- Language: Bengali

Nishan is a Bengali language swashbuckler film directed by S.S. Balan. This film was released on 4 August 1978 under the banner of Gemini Production Circuit Private Limited.

== Plot ==
The story concerns two neighbouring kingdoms and their vendetta. Uttam Kumar played a double role as twin princes Bijay and Bikram.

== Cast ==
- Uttam Kumar as Prince Bijay/Bikram
- Arati Bhattacharya as Ranjana
- Nazir Hussain as Doctor Shankarprasad
- Shekhar Chatterjee as King
- Sulochana Chatterjee
- Arabinda Panda
- Rajani Bala
- Mukul Ghosh
- Manik Dutta

== Soundtrack ==
Music direction was done by Shyamal Mitra and Lyricist was Gouri Prasanna Majumdar. Lead singers of the film are Kishore Kumar, Asha Bhosle, Chandrani Mukherjee, Arati Mukhopadhyay and Shyamal Mitra.

| Song | Singer |
|---|---|
| "Tumi Je Premer" | Kishore Kumar, Aarti Mukherji |
| "Pranbhara Swapna" | Kishore Kumar, Chandrani Mukherjee |
| "Surja Dube" | Shyamal Mitra, Chorus |
| "Tinak Ta Dhin" | Asha Bhosle, Chorus |
| "Ananda Bhara" | Chorus |
