= Arati Bhattacharya =

Indian Bengali actress

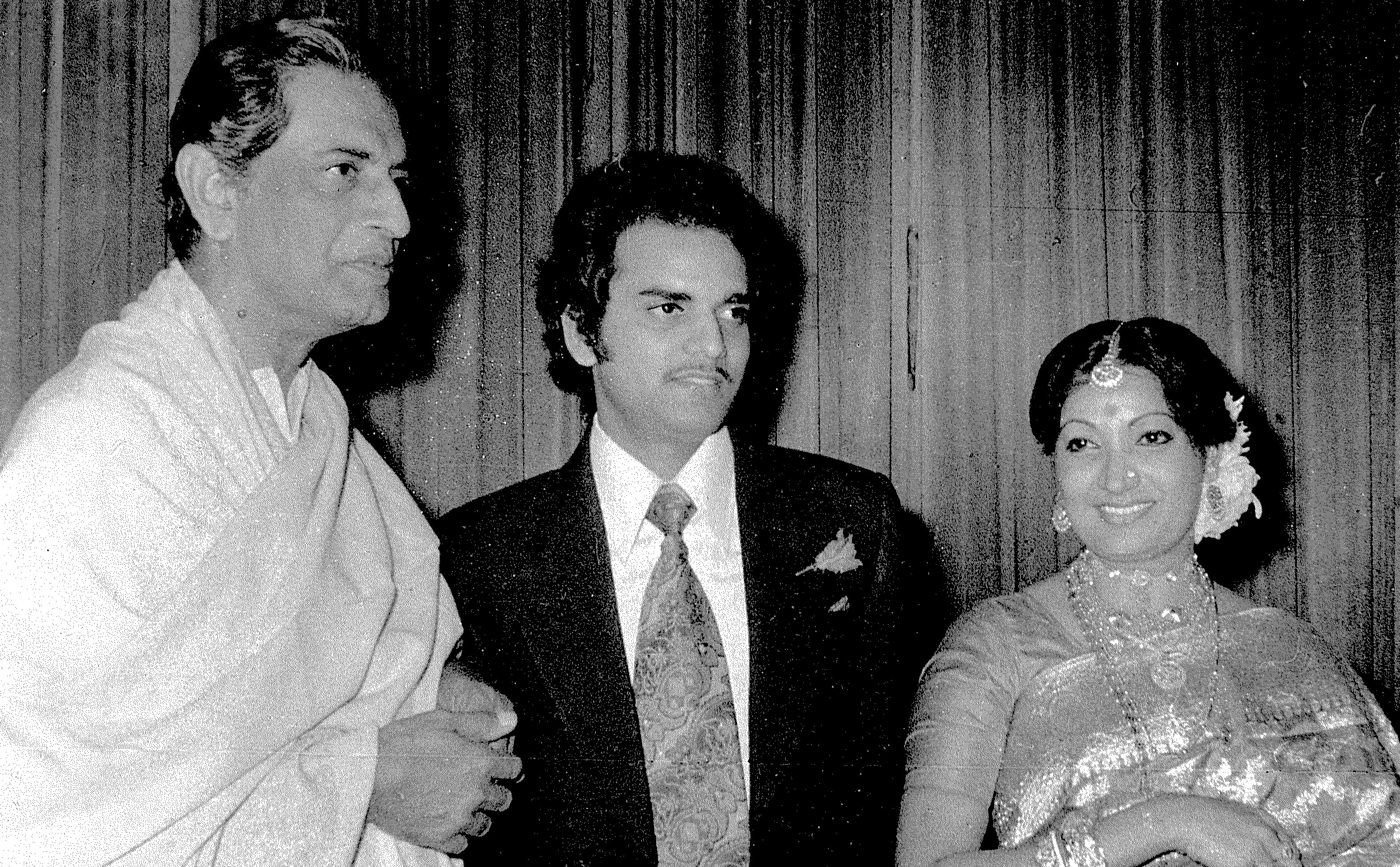
- Satyajit Ray at Bhattacharya's wedding with Kunal Singh
- Born: Hoogly (Chunchura)
- Occupation: Actress
- Spouse: Kunal Singh
- Children: Akash Singh (son)

Arati Bhattacharya (Born 8 November 1951) is an Indian Bengali actress, writer and director, who is recognized for her work in Bengali cinema.

== Career ==
She is known for films like Preyasi, Stree and Suryatrishna. She also sang in the movie Anandamela in 1976. She had worked with Satyajit Roy in Jana Aranya and Mrinal Sen in Ek Adhuri Kahani. She acted in more than 50 Bengali movies. She is also a Kathak dancer.

== Awards ==
- Won, Bengal Film Journalists' Association – Best Supporting Actress Award for Ami Se O Sakha (1976)

== Filmography ==
=== As an actor ===
1. Rewaz (unreleased)
2. Ek Adhuri Kahani (An unfinished story) (1972)
3. Picnic (1972)
4. Stree (1972)
5. Jeevantai Natak
6. Alo Andhare (1973)
7. Premer phande (1974)
8. Raja (1974)
9. Harmonium (1975)
10. Ami, Shey O Shakha (1975)
11. Harano-prapti-niruddesh (1975)
12. Anandamela
13. Jal Sanyasi
14. Rajbansha (1976)
15. Jana Aranya (The middle man) (1976) as Mrs Ganguly
16. Nandita (1976)
17. Asadharan (1977)
18. Golap bou (1977)
19. Jaal Sannyasi (1977)
20. Pratishruti (1977)
21. Rajbansha (1977)
22. Nishan (1978)
23. Moyna (1978)
24. Parichay (1978)
25. Striker (1978)
26. Job Charnoker Bibi (1978)
27. Jiban je rakam (1979)
28. Pampa (1979)
29. Nyay anyay (1981)
30. Surya trishna (1984)
31. Amar prithibi (1985)
32. preyasi (1986)
33. Kal Hamara Hain (1980) (Hindi)

=== As a director ===
1. Maashuka (1987)(Hindi)
2. Dagabaaz Balma (1988) (Bhojpuri)

=== As a script writer ===
1. Bloody Isshq (Hindi) (2013)
2. Chor Police (Bhojpuri) (2019)
