= Sonu Nigam =

Indian playback singer (born 1973)

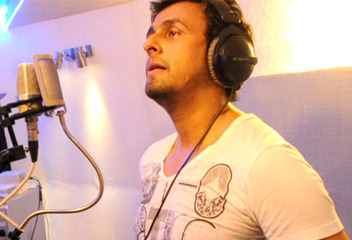
- Sonu Nigam recording a song, 2013
- Born: 30 July 1973 (age 53); Faridabad, Haryana, India
- Occupations: Playback singer; music director; actor; dubbing artist
- Years active: 1977–present
- Spouse: Madhurima Nigam (m. 2002)
- Children: 1
- Father: Agam Kumar Nigam
- Relatives: Teesha Nigam (sister)
- Awards: See below
- Honours: Padma Shri (2022)
- Musical career
- Genres: Filmi; Classical; Semi-Classical; Pop; R&B; EDM; Disco; Ghazals; Rock; Qawwali; Sufi; Devotional
- Instrument: Vocal
- Label: T-Series; Sony Music; Tips; Saregama

Sonu Nigam (born 30 July 1973) is an Indian playback singer, music director, dubbing artist and actor. He is considered one of the most versatile singers in India, with a wide vocal range. His performances include a wide range of genres, like classical music, devotional music, ghazals, qawwali, rock and pop music, among others. Nigam sings predominantly in Hindi- and Kannada-language films. He has recorded over 6,000 songs in more than 32 languages throughout his career. He has released a number of non-film albums and acted in some Hindi films. Nigam has been awarded one National Film Award, two Filmfare Awards and two Filmfare Awards South and four IIFA Awards for Best Playback Singer. He was ranked top artist on the Billboard Uncharted charts twice in September and October 2013. Nigam was honoured with the Padma Shri, India's fourth-highest civilian award in 2022.

Nigam has been nicknamed the "Modern Rafi" after his musical idol Mohammad Rafi. Apart from Hindi and Kannada, he has sung in Bengali, Marathi, Telugu, Tamil, Odia, English, Assamese, Malayalam, Gujarati, Bhojpuri, Nepali, Tulu, Maithili, and Manipuri. Nigam has released pop albums in Hindi, Kannada, Odia, Chhattisgarhi and Punjabi, as well as Hindu and Islamic devotional albums. He has released several Buddhist albums. Nigam has performed in countries in North America, Africa, Asia, Australia and in the Middle East and Western countries.

== Early and personal life ==
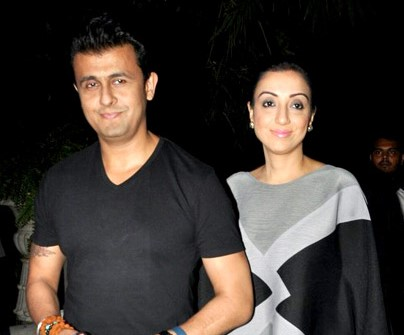
Nigam and his wife Madhurima at Rakesh Roshan's birthday in 2017

Sonu Nigam was born on 30 July 1973 to Agam Kumar Nigam and Shobha Nigam in the city of Faridabad, Haryana. His father was from Agra and his mother was from Garhwal. He has two sisters – Meenal Nigam, a yoga therapist, and Teesha Nigam, a professional singer.

Nigam began singing at the age of four, when he joined his father Agam Kumar Nigam on stage to sing Mohammed Rafi's song "Kya Hua Tera Wada". Nigam began accompanying his father on his singing appearances at weddings and parties. He moved to Mumbai with his father to begin his Bollywood singing career at the age of 19. He was trained by Hindustani classical singer Ustad Ghulam Mustafa Khan.

Nigam identifies as Hindu. He married Madhurima Mishra on 15 February 2002. They have a son.

Nigam had changed his name to Sonu Niigaam citing numerology beliefs, but later decided to go back to his birth name.

== Career ==
=== 1990s: Beginnings ===
Sonu Nigam began his career in early 1990s, initially overshadowed by Udit Narayan and Kumar Sanu. His first song for a film was "O Aasmanwale" from Aaja Meri Jaan (1983). He gained recognition with TV serial song "Hum To Chhaila Ban Gaye" from Talash (1992) and later for songs "Accha Sila Diya" (Bewafa Sanam), "Sandese Aate Hai" (Border), and "Yeh Dil Deewana" (Pardes). His album Deewana (1999) became popular. Nigam's first song in Kannada was in 1996 for the film Jeevanadhi. The song "Yello Yaro Hego" was composed by Koti with lyrics by R. N. Jayagopal. Nigam has since sung over 900 Kannada songs.

=== 2000s: Career peak ===
Notable hits from Nigam include "Suraj Hua Maddham", "You Are My Soniya" (Kabhi Khushi Kabhie Gham), "Panchi Nadiya Pawan Ke" (Refugee), "Tanhayee" (Dil Chahta Hai), and "Kal Ho Naa Ho" (Kal Ho Naa Ho), which earned him a National Film Award and Filmfare Award. He also performed internationally and released tribute albums for Mohammed Rafi such as Rafi Resurrected.

=== 2010–present: Later career and international collaborations ===
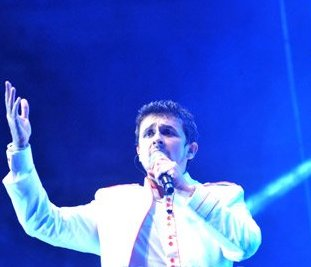
Nigam performing at the live concert in 2014

He sang "Chori Kiya Re Jiya" (Dabangg), "Abhi Mujh Mein Kahin" (Agneepath), and "Tere Bin" (Wazir). Nigam collaborated with Britney Spears for a remix of her song "I Wanna Go" in 2011. He further collaborated with Jermaine Jackson in the same year, for the song "This Is It", which was a tribute to American singer and Jermaine's brother, Michael Jackson, who had passed away 2 years prior. The duo performed the song at the 12th IIFA Awards. He further collaborated with Avicii, for the song "Indian Levels", a remix of the latter's "Levels", that released in 2012. He worked with Kshmr for the song "Underwater" in 2017.

He performed major live concerts worldwide, including "Rafi Kishore aur Main" (UK, 2021), and launched his NFT series. Nigam also launched the label, I Believe Music, in 2020. In 2024, he sang for the soundtrack of the stage production Humare Ram. It was produced by Rahul Bhuchar.

In February 2026, Nigam featured on the track "Iss Tarah", by singer-songwriter Chaar Diwaari. The song was included in the latter's EP Parvana.

== Other works ==
=== As a host and judge ===
Nigam was the host of the Sa Re Ga Ma Pa music show from 1995 until 2000 and became household name. He returned on Sa Re Ga Ma Pa Li'l Champs International as a judge with Suresh Wadkar in October 2007. Nigam was a celebrity judge on the Sa Re Ga Ma Pa Mega Challenge grand finale on 12 December 2009.

Nigam hosted the TV show Kisme Kitna Hai Dum on Star Plus in 2002.

In 2006, Nigam hosted Life Ki Dhun with Sonu Nigaam on Radiocity 91.1 FM, interviewing musicians. He appeared as a celebrity judge on STAR Voice of India in August 2007 (Season 1) and in December 2008 (Season 2), and on the grand finale of music reality show Jo Jeeta Wohi Super Star on 12 July 2008. Nigam was a judge/mentor on Chhote Ustaad – Do Deshon Ki Ek Awaaz (July – October 2010) with Rahat Nusrat Fateh Ali Khan, and was a judge/mentor on the first season of X Factor (India) (29 May – 2 September 2011) along with Sanjay Leela Bhansali and Shreya Ghoshal. On 23 August 2015, he appeared on "The Anupam Kher Show" sharing his life experiences. He has been also one of the three judges of Indian Idol 2016–17.

Sonu has also hosted 3rd Mirchi Music Awards, 6th Mirchi Music Awards, 8th Mirchi Music Awards, 9th Mirchi Music Awards, 10th Mirchi Music Awards, 11th Mirchi Music Awards, 13th Mirchi Music Awards and 14th Mirchi Music awards In 2021, Sonu Nigam appeared as one of the judges in the Bengali music reality show Super Singer Season 3 on Star Jalsha, along with Kumar Sanu and Kaushiki Chakraborty.

== Singing style and influence ==
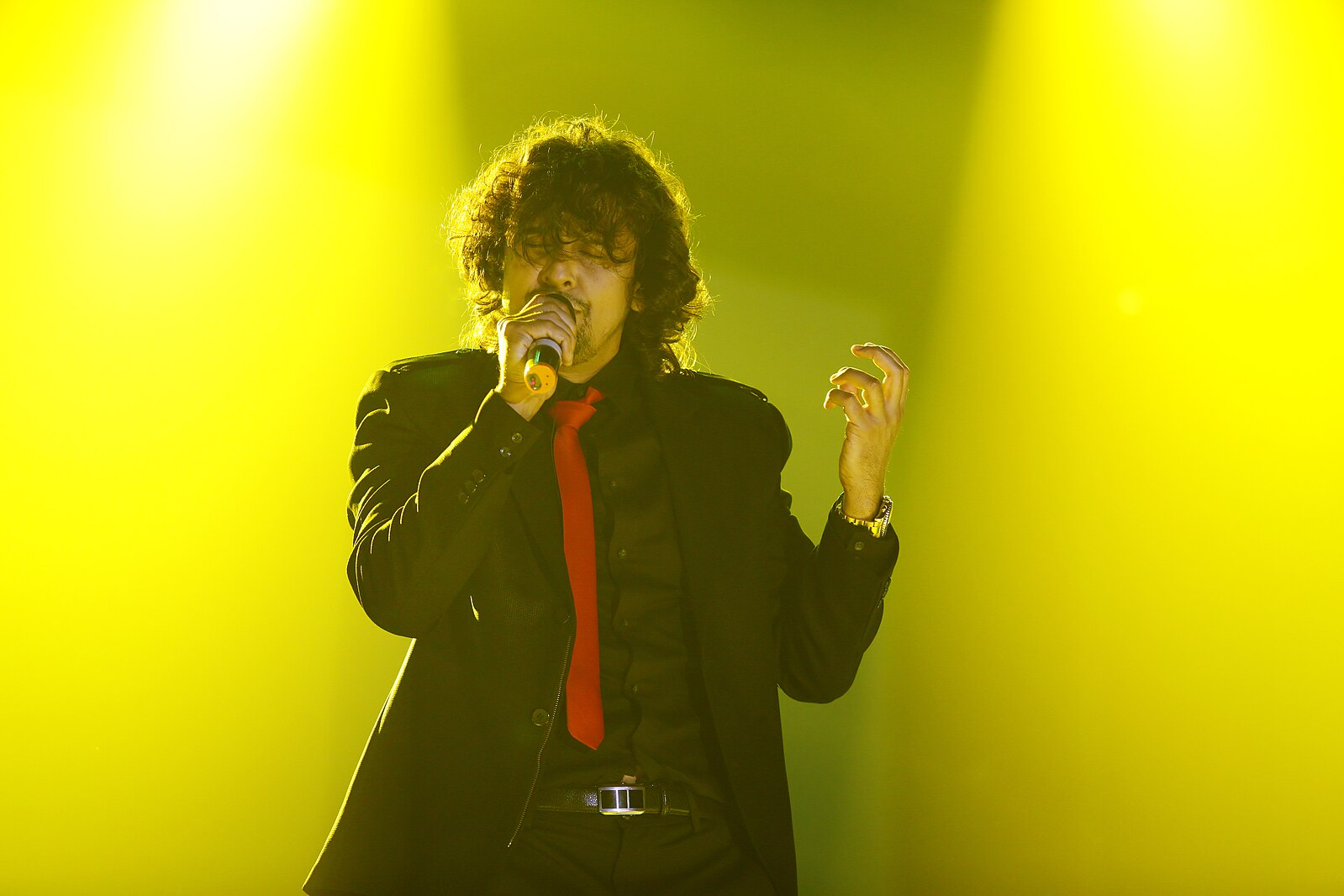
Sonu Nigam at an event in 2012.

Sonu Nigam is considered as one of the most versatile singers in the history of Indian music industry. Forbes India has described Nigam as a versatile singer. Additionally, Radio Mirchi, Saregama, and Outlook India have described Nigam as a versatile singer. The Times of India has described Nigam as a notable live performer. He has often been compared to Mohammed Rafi for a similar vocal texture. Lata Mangeshkar said of him, "Among contemporary singers, I like Sonu Nigam the best. He is serious about his music, has learnt classical and sings with confidence". Singers Armaan Malik and Ankit Tiwari cite Nigam as a major musical inspiration. Shreya Ghoshal considers Nigam "her favourite contemporary singer". Sunidhi Chauhan stated, "His singing is so perfect, that if you listen to him live, you won't be able to tell if he's singing live or in the studio". Arijit Singh said,"Sonu Nigam is the ultimate versatile singer, whose versatility is impossible for anyone to match, and no singer today can sing as flawlessly as he does". Palash Sen of Euphoria called Nigam the most talented singer in Bollywood. S. P. Balasubrahmanyam also appreciated his singing.

== Awards and honours ==
Sonu Nigam receiving the National Film Award for Best Male Playback Singer, 2004 from President Dr. A.P.J. Abdul Kalam.

Sonu Nigam receiving the Padma Shri Award from President Ram Nath Kovind in 2022.

Nigam has received several major awards including the Padma Shri (2022), National Film Award for Best Male Playback Singer (2004), multiple Filmfare Awards and Filmfare Awards South, and four IIFA Awards. The background score of Jal (2014), composed by Sonu Nigam and Bickram Ghosh, was included on the Academy's preliminary consideration list for the Academy Award for Best Original Score.

- 2004 – National Film Award for Best Male Playback Singer for "Kal Ho Naa Ho" – Kal Ho Naa Ho
- 2004 – Filmfare Award for Best Male Playback Singer for "Kal Ho Naa Ho" – Kal Ho Naa Ho
- Multiple years – IIFA Award for Best Male Playback Singer for songs including "Suraj Hua Maddham" and "Kal Ho Naa Ho"
- 2022 – Padma Shri
- Oscar consideration list – 2014, Best Original Score for Jal (with Bickram Ghosh)
- Significant regional awards – Filmfare Awards South (Kannada), Zee Cine Awards, Screen Awards
- Other recognitions – Mirchi Music Awards, GIMA Awards, Lokmat Sur Jyotsna Award, Champions of Change Award, Doctorate from Teerthanker Mahaveer University

== Discography ==
=== As a music director ===
Year	Film
2013	Sooper Se Ooper
2013	Singh Saab The Great
2014	Jal
2017	Half Widow

== Filmography ==
=== Films ===
Year	Title	Role	Notes
1980	Pyaara Dushman		Child artist
1982	Ustadi Ustad Se	Young Rajesh	Child artist
1982	Kaamchor	Sonu	Child artist
1983	Betaab	Sunny	Child artist
2002	Jaani Dushman: Ek Anokhi Kahani	Vivek Saxena	
2003	Kash Aap Hamare Hote	Jai Kumar	
2004	Love in Nepal	Abby	
2005	Navra Maza Navsacha		Marathi film; guest appearance in a song
2013	Warning		Guest appearance in the song "Takeedein"
2016	Raakh		Guest appearance in song 'Bas Itna Hai Kahena"
2019	Spotless	Varun	Short film
2019	SP Chauhan	Himself	Guest appearance in song 'Ishq Ki Gali'
2024	Navra Maza Navsacha 2	Himself	Marathi film; guest appearance in a song

=== Dubbing work ===
Film title	Original Voice	Character	Dub Language	Original Language	Original Release	Dub Release	Notes
Aladdin	Scott Weinger (Speaking); Brad Kane (Singing)	Aladdin (Speaking and Singing)	Hindi	English	1992	1994	Dubbed by Modi Entertainment.

=== Television ===
Year	Title	Role	Notes	Ref.
1995–2000	Sa Re Ga Ma Pa	Host		
1998	Movers and Shakers	Special co-guest	With his co-guest Divya Dutta; Indian late night television talk show	
2002	Kisme Kitna Hai Dum	Host		
2004–2006	Indian Idol	Judge	season 1–2	
2005	Sensational Sonu Nigam – Making of a Star	Himself		
2007	Sa Re Ga Ma Pa Li'l Champs International	Judge		
2010	Chhote Ustaad 2	Judge		
2011	X Factor India	Judge		
2011	3rd Mirchi Music Awards	Host		
2012	Zee Rishtey Awards 2012	Host		
2013	MTV Unplugged	Singer		
2013	Kaun Banega Crorepati	Special Appearance		
2014	6th Mirchi Music Awards	Host		
2015	Suron Ke Rang Colors Ke Sang	Host		
2016	8th Mirchi Music Awards	Host		
2016–2017	Indian Idol	Judge	season 9	
2017	9th Mirchi Music Awards	Host		
2018	10th Mirchi Music Awards	Host		
2019	11th Mirchi Music Awards	Host		
2020	Sangeet Setu – Artists' Care for India	Singer		
2020	Super Singer (Season 2) on Star Jalsha	Guest	Super Finale episode	
2021	13th Mirchi Music Awards	Host		
2021	Unacademy Unwind With MTV	Singer		
2021	Super Singer season 3 (Bengali)	Judge		
2022	Naam Reh Jaayega	Host		

== Controversies ==
In 2015, Sonu Nigam claimed that ZEE Music Company had banned him after he publicly supported Kumar Vishwas on Twitter.

On 16 April 2017, he tweeted a series of complaints about the amplified azan, the Muslim call to prayer, describing it as "an enforced display of religion". He tweeted:

1. " God bless everyone. I'm not a Muslim and I have to be woken up by the Azaan in the morning. When will this forced religiousness end in India."
2. " And by the way Mohammed did not have electricity when he made Islam.. Why do I have to have this cacophony after Edison?"
3. "I don't believe in any temple or gurudwara using electricity To wake up people who don't follow the religion. Why then..? Honest? True?"
4. " Gundagardi hai bus..."

In his later tweet, he stated that he stands by his statement. He later clarified that he does not oppose any specific religious ritual, but rather the use of loudspeakers on religious buildings. According to the law, he said, "the use of loudspeakers to create noise pollution should be prohibited at certain times of day, regardless of the source". Later, he posted a video of azan being practised, recorded from his home, to further voice his dissent. Syed Sha Atef Ali Al Quaderi, vice-president of the West Bengal United Minority Council, offered a ₹10 lakh reward for shaving Sonu Nigam's head. In response, Nigam shaved his own head in order to claim the reward. He deactivated his Twitter account in 2017, citing lack of freedom of speech, and said that sensible discussions were not possible due to the polarised atmosphere.

Following the death of actor Sushant Singh Rajput in June 2020, Sonu Nigam posted a video in which he accused two major companies of monopolising the music industry and discriminating against him. He urged these companies to treat newcomers fairly. He went on to state that malpractice in Bollywood was widespread and almost destroying the country's musical talent. Nigam later insisted that he had not named anyone, and was "merely expressing his opinion on malpractice within the Bollywood music industry". However, in a second video, he called out Bhushan Kumar, the CEO of T-Series.

In February 2022, he was accused of collaborating with Rocky and Rehan Siddiqui, both of whom have been blacklisted by the Consulate General of India for malpractice and for supporting Pakistan-based terrorist groups. When US-based concert promoter Rajender Singh Pahl approached him about performing at an event, he recommended Pahl contact Siddiqui.

In December 2023, Omer Nadeem, a singer from Pakistan, accused Nigam of plagiarising his song "Aye Khuda" from his track "Sun Zara" released by T-Series. Sonu further clarified and wrote that "Just so you all know, I have nothing to do with this. I was requested to do the song by KRK (Kamaal R. Khan), who is my neighbour in Dubai . . . If I had heard Omer's version, I would have never sung it".

In May 2025, Sonu Nigam faced backlash and an FIR after linking the demand to sing in Kannada at a concert in Bengaluru. This prompted outrage from pro-Kannada groups. In his defence, Nigam claimed that he had been threatened, and insisted that he intended to condemn hate speech, not the Kannada community.

== See also ==
- List of Indian playback singers
- Prabhat Samgiita
