= Sanchita Bhattacharya =

Indian playback singer

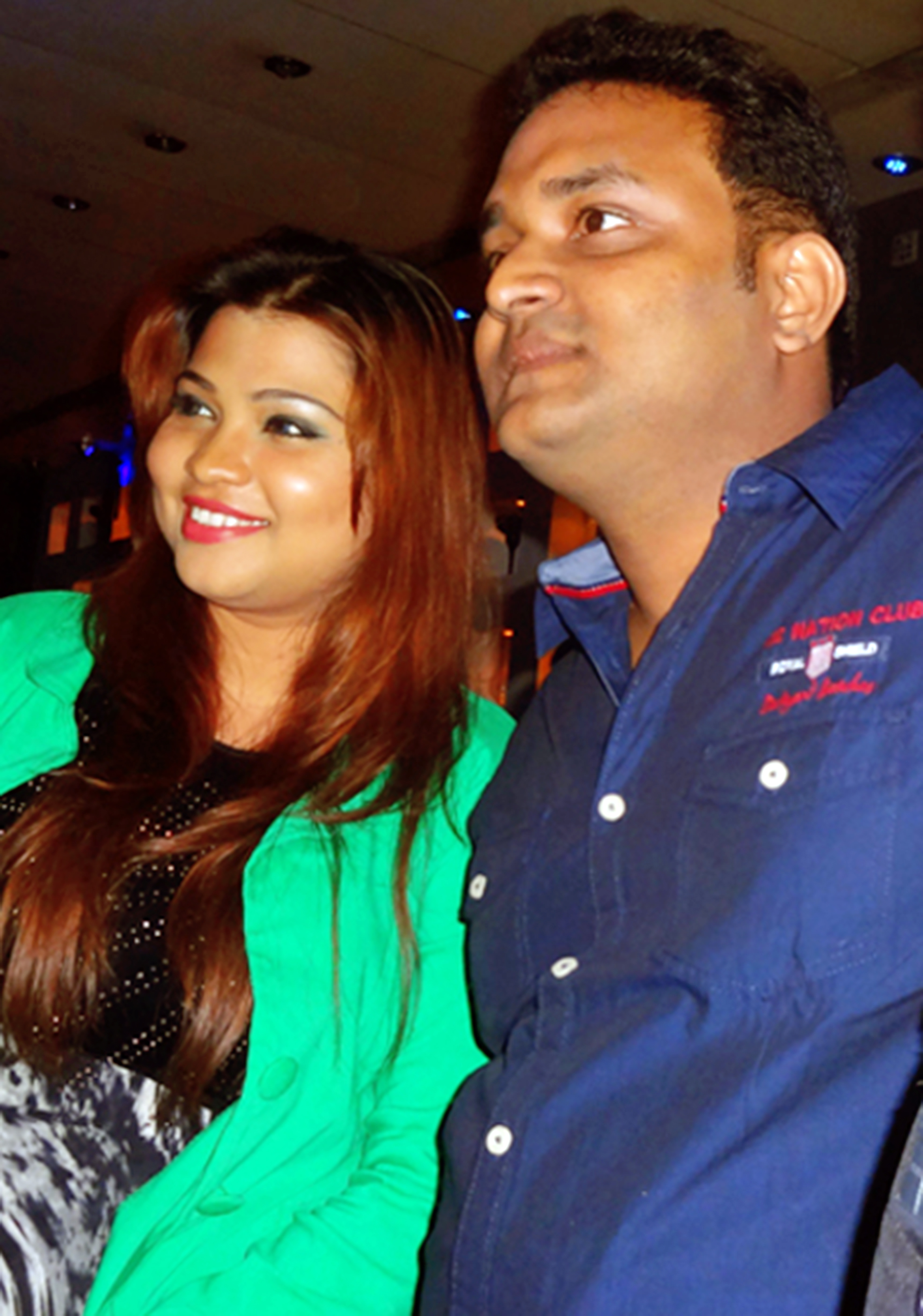
- Sanchita Bhattacharya & Sanjiv Routh Sarkar together at Press Release of Bengali Film Masoom.
- Born: 19 February 1992 (age 34); Kolkata, West Bengal, India
- Occupations: Playback singer; Composer; Music producer; Television presenter
- Years active: 2006–present
- Spouse: Abhishek Gargari (m. 2016; div. 2026)
- Parents: Dhruba Bhattacharya (father); Rupa Bhattacharya (mother)
- Relatives: Soumya Bhattacharya (brother)
- Musical career
- Genres: Filmi; Pop; Rock; Western; Classical; Bhajan; Ghazal
- Instrument: Vocals
- Labels: Universal Music; Times Music; Sony Music; Zee Music; T-Series; Tips; Saregama; Venus

Sanchita Bhattacharya (born 19 February 1992) is an Indian playback singer, composer and television personality. At the age of 14, this makes her the oldest winner in the Sa Re Ga Ma Pa L'il Champs history as well as the first female winner with public voting. She has recorded songs for films and albums in various Indian languages.

== Discography ==
Denotes films that have not yet been released

Year	Movie	Songs	Music Director	Co-singer(s)	Note(s)
2007	Bal Ganesh	Haathi Ka Bal Hai	Shamir Tandon	Solo	Hindi
2008	Mithya	Zara Zara	Sagar Desai	Solo	Hindi
2013	Yamla Pagla Deewana 2	Yamla Pagla Deewana	Shaarib-Toshi	Sukhwinder Singh, Shankar Mahadevan, Rahul Seth	Hindi
2013	Yamla Pagla Deewana 2	Sadi Daru Da Pani (YPD version)	Shaarib-Toshi	Toshi Sabri, Rahul Seth	Hindi
2013	Krisnaruupa	Jai Jai Krishna	Ruupa Raaman	Solo	Hindi
2013	Krisnaruupa	Shreenaathji Darshan	Ruupa Raaman	Anweshaa, Sraboni Chaudhuri	Hindi
2014	Kaanchi: The Unbreakable	Koshampa	Ismail Darbar	Anweshaa and Subhash Ghai	Hindi
2014	Kaanchi: The Unbreakable	Kambal Ke Neech	Ismail Darbar	Neeti Mohan, Aishwarya Majmudar	Hindi
2014	Kaanchi: The Unbreakable	Adiye Adiye	Ismail Darbar	Avril Quadros	
2014	Masoom	Aj Theke Tumi	Sanjib Sarkar	Prasenjit Mallick	Bengali
2018	Purulia Express (Album)	Anti-Virus	Shubham Ganguly	Raaz Chakraborty	Bengali
2018	Danga The riot	Chal Sanam	Soumitra Kundu	Sujoy Bhoumik	Bengali
2018	Sagar Mere Pass (Album)	Sagar Mere Pass	Partha Banerjee	Partha Banerjee	Hindi
2018	Anti Virus (Album)	The Last Word	Shubham Ganguly	Solo	Bengali
2018	Anti Virus (Album)	Memory	Shubham Ganguly	Raaz Chakraborty	Bengali
2018	Anti Virus (Album)	Sound of Bangladesh	Shubham Ganguly	Raaz Chakraborty	Bengali
2018	Anti Virus (Album)	Puruliya Express	Shubham Ganguly	Raaz Chakraborty	Bengali
2018	Anti Virus (Album)	18+	Shubham Ganguly	Raaz Chakraborty	Bengali
2018	Anti Virus (Album)	Butterfly	Shubham Ganguly	Raaz Chakraborty	Bengali
2018	Anti Virus (Album)	Budee	Shubham Ganguly	Raaz Chakraborty	Bengali
2019	Bhulte Parini (Album)	Bhulte Parini	Shantiraj Khosla	Solo	Bengali
2019	Tumi Bina Bondhu (Album)	Tumi Bina Bondhu	Baidyanath Dash	Sayam Paul	Bengali
2019	Bhokatta	Buladi (Item Song)	Baidyanath Dash	Solo	Bengali
