= Bangabasi Morning College =

Undergraduate college affiliated with the University of Calcutta, India

Coordinates: 22°34′9.06″N 88°22′6.01″E

- Motto: प्रणिप्रातेन परिप्रशनेन सेवया 'Bhagvad Gita (Earn Education & Serve the Humanitarian)
- Type: Public
- Established: 1965; 61 years ago
- President: Ashok Kumar Deb
- Principal: Dr. Amitava Dutta
- Undergraduates: 3000+
- Postgraduates: 20+
- Location: Kolkata, West Bengal, India
- Campus: Urban; 2 campuses
- Recognition: NAAC A Level
- Website: www.bangabasimorning.edu.in

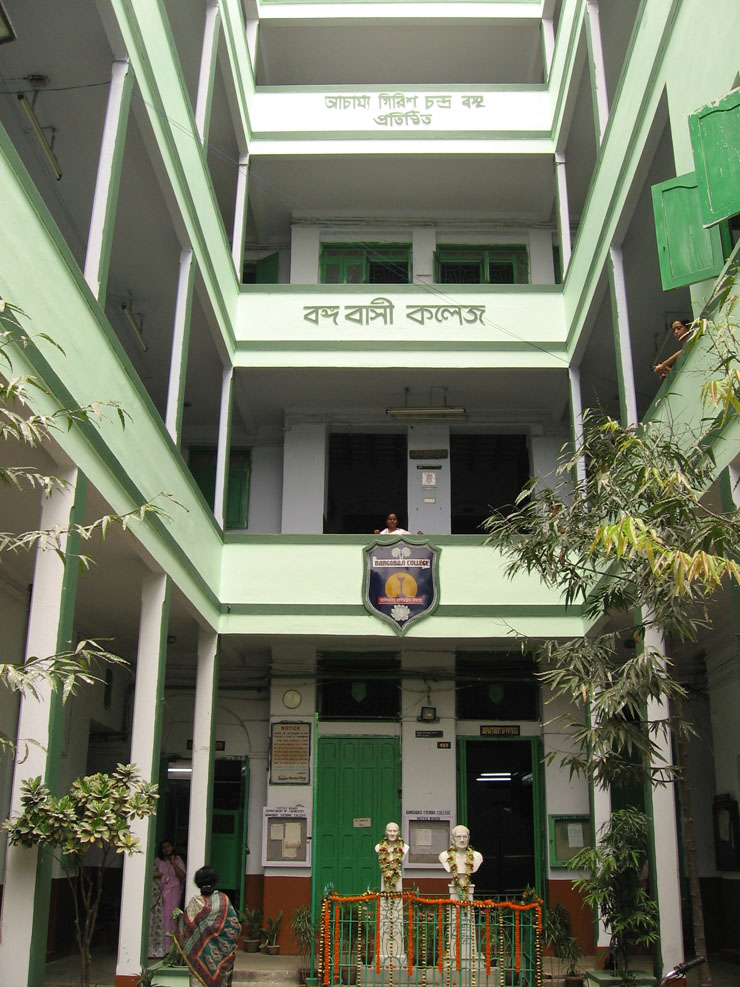
Bangabasi Morning College

Bangabasi Morning College is an undergraduate college affiliated with the University of Calcutta. It is located at Sealdah in the heart of the city of Kolkata. It has a very large auditorium named as P.K. Bose Memorial Hall.

== Accreditation ==
Bangabasi Morning College has been Re-Accredited with Grade "A" by NAAC in December 2016.

== Cultural Programmes ==
College has many cultural programme including the regional cultural programme of West Bengal, main programme which are organized by the students are:

- Rabindra Jayanti on 9 May
- Netaji birthday on 23 Jan
- Independence Day on 15 Aug
- Founders Day on 27 Sept
- Saraswati Puja
- Bengali New Year on 15 Apr
- Republic Day on 26 Jan

Every year the college publishes an Annual Magazine enriched with contribution from member of the staff and the students on the various subjects. It encourages the students to contribute their own article for publication. The magazine helps to kindle the creative talents of the students.

=== Annual Social Day ===
Annual social day is celebrated every year in college campus. Every year a Freshers welcome party is celebrated to welcome the new admitted students. In 2013 an inter-college quiz competition was organized in which a student named ABHISHEK TIWARI got the 1st prize. Every year the college organizes a blood donation camp to donate the blood to the NGO'S and related charitable trust.

== Faculty ==
- History: Dr. Sandeep Sinha (Ph.D., M.A.)
- Anthropology: Dr. P. Sarkar (M.Sc., Ph.D., assistant professor)
- Hindi: Dr. Ausotosh Kumar (M.A., Ph.D., Assistant Professor)
- Zoology: Dr. Sreejata Biswas (M.Sc., Ph.D., B.Ed., Assistant Professor)
- Botany: Dr. Shyamali Mazumdar (M.Sc., L.L.B., Ph.D., Associate Professor)
- Bengali: Dr.Madan Chandra (M.A., M.Phil, Pd.D., Assistant Professor)
- Chemistry: Dr. Amitabh Dutta (M.sc., Ph.D., Assistant Professor)
- Computer Science:Sri Subhrat Dinda, M.C.A., M.Tech.
- Mathematics: Dr.Sujata Sinha (M.A., Ph.D., Assistant Professor)
- Philosophy:Smt Sukla Sarkar (M.A., Assistant Professor)
- Physics: Dr. Mukul Mitra (M.Sc., PhD., associate professor)
- Librarian: Smt Shila Ghosh (M.A., B.Lib., I.Sc)

== Courses ==
Presently the college offers honours degree courses in the following:

- Accounting & Finance
- Bengali
- Biological Science
- Botany
- Computer Science
- Economics
- English
- Mathematics
- Physics
- Political Science
- Chemistry
- Zoology

It is one of the few centers of study of Urdu at the undergraduate level, and grants degrees including B.Sc., B.Com., and Bachelor of Arts.

== Undergraduate courses ==
=== B.SC. (PURE) ===
Honours : Physics, Chemistry, Mathematics, Computer Science

General : Physics, Mathematics, Chemistry, Computer Science

=== B.SC.(BIO) ===
Honours : Botany, Zoology, Anthropology

General : Zoology, Botany, Chemistry

=== B.A ===
Honours : Bengali, English, Political Science, Hindi

General : Elective Bengali, Elective English, Elective Hindi, Elective Urdu, Political Science, History, Philosophy, Economics, Geography

=== B.COM ===
Honours : Accounting & Finance

General : All compulsory subjects under B.Com Syllabus

== Facility ==
The college has large size campus in area and it gives all the facility to the students that a college must have. The main facility provided by the college are:

- Common Room (university)
- Students Union Room
- Library
- Canteen
- Computer Lab
- Laboratories for (Physics, Chemistry, Zoology, Botany, Anthropology, Computer Sc)
- College Auditorium
- Sports Club
- N.C.C. Room

== Alumni ==
- Jatindra Nath Das
- Netaji civil activist
- Sanjib Sarkar - Music director

== See also ==
- Bangabasi College
- Bangabasi Evening College
