= Anamika Choudhari =

Indian singer

- Born: Anamika Choudhari
- Genres: Pop, Filmi
- Occupation: Singer
- Instrument: Vocals
- Years active: 2008–present

Anamika Choudhari is an Indian singer. She was the winner in Zee TV's children's singing competition Sa Re Ga Ma Pa Li'l Champs International. Later, she participated in Chota Packet Bada Dhamaka, where she secured fourth place. She then participated in Hero Honda SaReGaMaPa Mega Challenge representing Assam along with Biswajit Ray and Joy Chakraborty.
