= Arjumman Mughal =

Bollywood actress and international super model

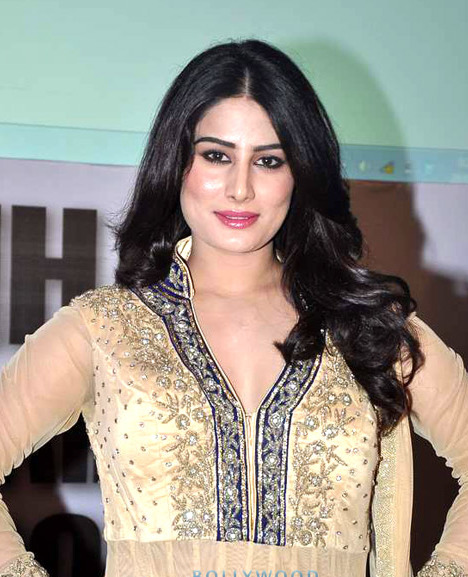
- Mughal in 2014
- Born: 01-01-1988; Nowshera, Jammu and Kashmir, India
- Occupations: Actress and model
- Years active: 2003–present
- Known for: Ya Rab (2014)

Arjumman Mughal is an Indian actress and model. She started as model in the field of entertainment in 2003. She got awards as best face of the year, model of the year. A popular face of the year, she was known for her jewellery ads. She did 2,160 commercials. After a successful modelling career, she made her acting debut in 2008 with the Tamil film Pazhaniappa Kalloori. In February 2014 she again debuted in Bollywood with the movie Ya Rab.

== Career ==
Mughal made her acting debut in Bollywood with the film Ya Rab directed by Hasnain Hyderabadwala, as main protagonist in which she played the role of Amreen. She, originally from Rajouri in the Jammu region, moved to Mumbai in 2003. Mughal completed her schooling in Nowshera before moving to Delhi and later to Mumbai to pursue a career in modeling. She also earned her graduation degree in Mumbai. She later received the International Women Achievement Award for Most Popular Model.

== Filmography ==
Year	Title	Role	Language	Notes
2007	Pazhaniappa Kalloori	Priya	Tamil	
2014	Ya Rab	Amreen	Hindi	
2020	O Pushpa I Hate Tears	Pushpa	Hindi	
2022	3 Shyaane	Shreya	Hindi	
2023	Zindagi Shatranj Hai		Hindi	
