= Ikram Akhtar =

Indian film producer and screenwriter

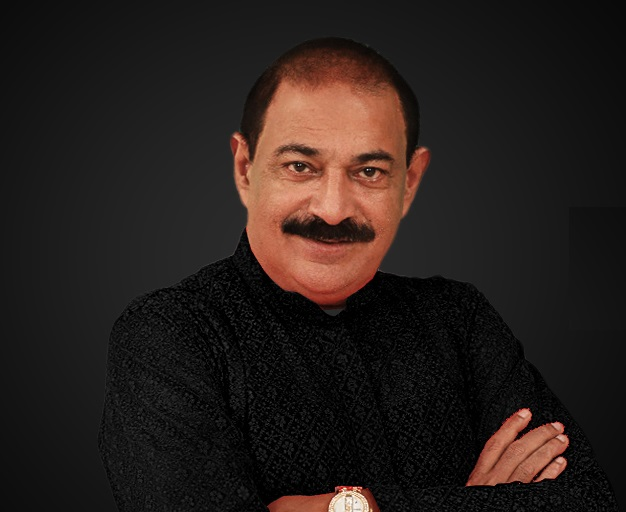
- Born: Ikram Akhtar
- Occupations: Indian film producer writer & director
- Years active: 1990–present

Ikram Akhtar is an Indian screenwriter, producer and director working in Bollywood. He has started acting institute named Ikram Akhtar Actor Factors.

== Filmography ==
=== Director ===
Year	Film
2015	I Love Dubai

=== Writer ===
Year	Film
2011	Ready
2011	Thank You
2010	No Problem
2009	Baabarr
2003	Nayee Padosan
2002	Chalo Ishq Ladaaye
2000	Joru Ka Ghulam
2000	Chal Mere Bhai
2000	Baaghi
2000	Kunwara
2000	Tera Jadoo Chal Gaya
1998	Pyaar To Hona Hi Tha
1997	Chhota Chetan
