= Tarun Sagar =

Indian Jain monk (1967–2018)

Muni Shri 108 Tarun Sagar Ji Maharaj
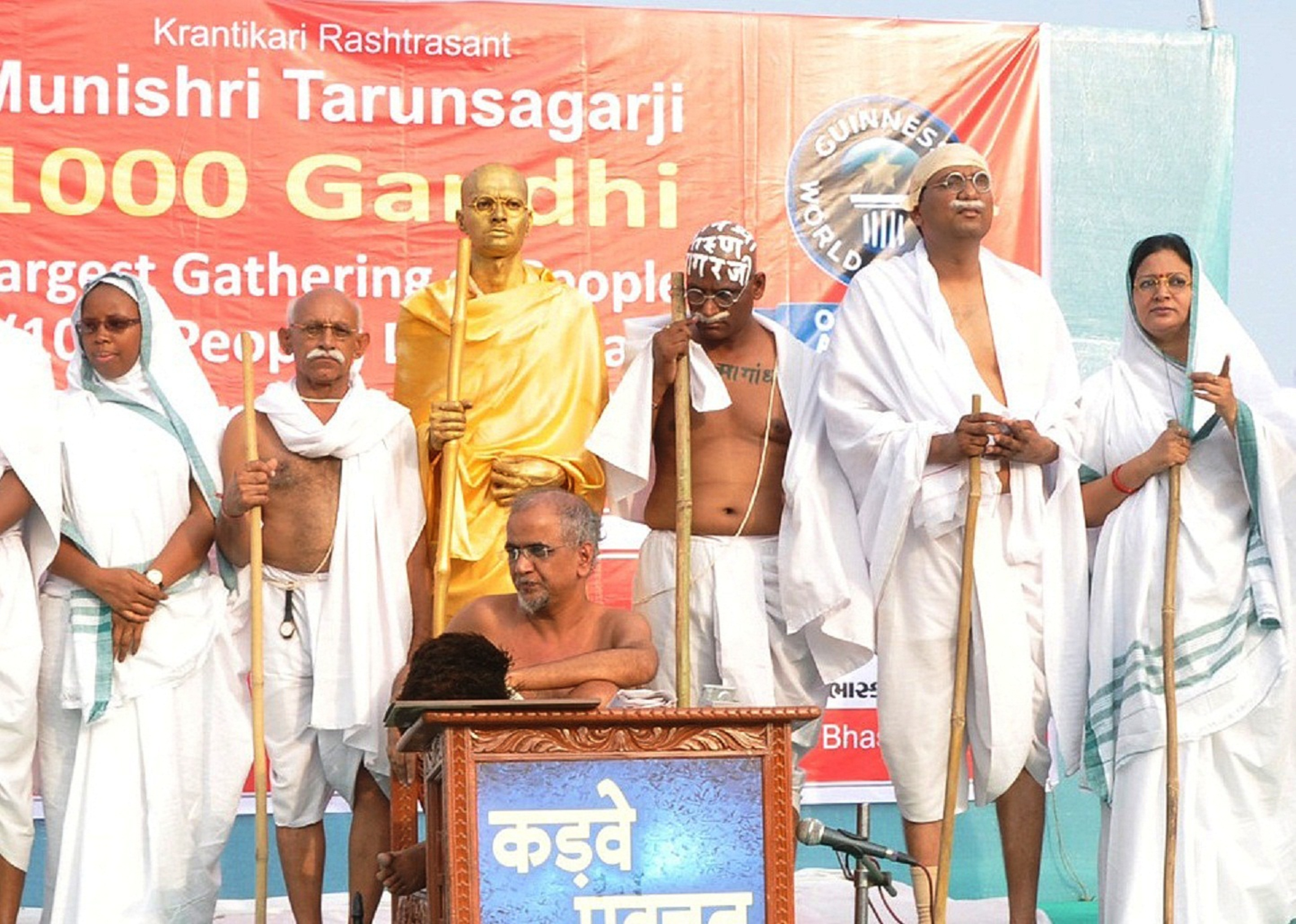
- Sagar ji in 2012.

Personal life
- Born: 26 June 1967 Guhanchi, Madhya Pradesh, India
- Died: 1 September 2018 (aged 51) New Delhi, India
- Website: www.tarunvani.com

Religious life
- Religion: Jainism
- Sect: Digambara
- Initiation: 20 July 1988; Bagidora, Rajasthan by Acharya Pushpadantsagar

Religious career
- Predecessor: Acharya Pushpadantsagar

Muni Tarun Sagar (26 June 1967 – 1 September 2018) was an Indian Digambara monk. His lectures are termed Kadve Pravachan (bitter discourses) because they can be candidly critical of common practices and views. His lectures have been compiled and published in book series also titled Kadve Pravachan. Excerpts from his discourses are often published by newspapers. Unlike most other Digambar Jain monks, his audience often included a majority of non-Jains. His discourses often addressed family or society issues.

== Early life ==
Muni Tarun Sagar was born on 26 June 1967 to Pratap Chandra Jain and Shanti Bai Jain, who were themselves inducted into the Digambara sect of Jainism by Acharya Dharmasagar, in a small village of Guhanchi in Damoh, Madhya Pradesh, India. At the age of 13 he was initiated as a Kshullak and a Digambara monk by Acharya Pushpdant Sagar on 20 July 1988 in Bagidora, Rajasthan at the age of 20. He emerged as a prominent personality when GTV initiated a program called "Mahavira Vani".

He became very sick during his travels in 2007, but at Kolhapur, he resolved to remain a Jain monk. However he started using a doli for conveyance, rather than continue to walk on foot as required.

== Discourses ==
In 2000, he gave an address from the Red Fort, Delhi. After wandering through Haryana (2000), Rajasthan (2001), Madhya Pradesh (2002), Gujarat (2003), Maharashtra (2004), he arrived in Karnataka in 2006 for the occasion of Maha Mastak Abhisheka celebrations at Shravanabelagola after having walked for 65-days from Belgaum. By this time he had emerged as a "progressive Jain monk" for his criticism of violence, corruption and conservatism, and his speeches came to be called "Katu Pravachan". He agreed to have his Chaturmas in Bangalore.

In 2014, During his Agra visit, Rashtriya Swayamsevak Sangh Chief Mohan Bhagwat also came to meet him personally and discussed and listened to the discourse.

Muni Tarun Sagar has often met politicians and government officials as a guest. He has delivered his sermons Madhya Pradesh Legislative Assembly in 2010 and in Haryana Legislative Assembly on 26 August 2016.

His 2015 Chaturmas was in Shri 1008 Parshvanath Digambar Jain Mandir, Sector 16, Faridabad. 108 Jain Śrāvaka pairs welcomed Tarun Sagar by washing his feet with 108 kalashas in 108 plates over a 200 feet ramp.

He appeared on the talk show Aap ki adalat hosted by Rajat Sharma on 18 March 2017 where he revealed that in childhood he liked the sweet Jalebi the most. In childhood once going on road he listened to the voice "tum bhi bhagwan ban sakte ho" meaning 'you can also become God'. This was the voice of Digambar Jain monk Pushpdant Sagarji. After hearing these words, Muni Tarun Sagar ji left his home. Rajat Sharma candidly asked many questions, many related to the conduct of a Digambar Jain monk. The Muni answered without being offended, often with humor or reciting verses.

He has been candid in both criticizing and praising politicians, including Narendra Modi.

== Views ==
Although he belonged to the Digambara sect, he promoted a non-sectarian outlook. In 2013 at Jaipur, he joined the Śvētāmbara monks during his chaturmas. In 2014, he inspired a Dharma Sansad, which was attended by Acharyas of Śvētāmbara Terapanth, Sthānakavāsī and Murtipujaka sects.

Muni Tarun Sagar has expressed his views on Islamic traditions too. He once said that Love Jihad is a conspiracy to convert Hindu girls into Muslims. He has also raised his opposition to the Islamic practice of Triple Talaq.

His other discourses were on:

- Take care of death and god
- Don't fall into the trap of 100
- Mohan Bhagwat went for blessings of Saint
- Jain Muni told several important things in bitter manner
- Jain Muni asked people to stop Alcoholic beverage and Non-veg

== Works ==
- He was invited to an RSS Vijaya Dashami function in Nagpur in September 2009 where he pointed out that using leather belts did not reflect non-violence. Subsequently, leather belts in the dress of Rashtriya Swayamsevak Sangh were replaced with canvas ones.
- He got the Chief Minister Shivraj Singh Chouhan to agree not to open new liquor shops in Madhya Pradesh in June 2010.
- He also started a movement called Ahimsa Mahakumbh to stop export of meat and leather from India.
- He opposed the Rajasthan High Court's order to impose ban on Sallekhana.
- Muni Tarun Sagar has constituted a national award - Tarun Kranti Puruskar which was awarded to Baba Ramdev, Vijay Darda and JITO in 2012 by the then Gujarat CM Narendra Modi.
- He published his discourses in a book series titled Kadve Pravachan (Bitter Discourse) starting in 2003 in Ahmedabad. The series has had eight volumes. His discourses are telecasted and watched in over 100 countries by the Jain community.
- Jyoti Amge, who is less than 25 inches tall, released Tarun Sagar's Kadve Pravachan (Bitter Utterances), a book measuring 30 feet by 24 feet and weighing 2,000 kilograms, on 18 August 2013 in Jaipur.

=== Newspaper articles ===
He has got many of his articles published in newspapers. Some of them are:

- Jealousy fetches you nothing
- Don't be egoistic because of your money!
- Dharma seems necessary?
- I am not Anti-Pandit but Anti-Hypocrisy
- Where there is bickering, there is hell

There is a famous discourse on The Crematory by him.

"श्मशान गांव के बाहर नहीं, बल्कि शहर के बीच चौराहे पर होना चाहिए । श्मशान उस जगह होना चाहिए जहां से आदमी दिन में 10 बार गुजरता है ताकि जब- जब वह वहां से गुजरे तो वहां जलती लाशे और अधजले मुर्दों को देख कर उसे भी अपनी मृत्यु का ख्याल आ जाए और अगर ऐसा हुआ तो दुनिया के 70 फ़ीसदी पाप और अपराध शब्द खत्म हो जाएंगे। आज का आदमी भूल गया है कि कल उसे मर जाना है तुम कहते जरूर होगी एक दिन सभी को मर जाना है। तुम कहते जरूर होगी कि एक दिन मर जाना है, पर उन मरने वालों में तुम अपने आप को अपने को कहा गिनते हो?" Means "The cemetery should not be outside the village, but on the intersection between the city. Cremation should be in place from which man passes ten times a day so that when he passes through there, seeing the burning flame and the dead body, he should also consider his death and if this happens then 70 per cent of the world's sin And the word 'crime' will end. Today's man has forgotten that tomorrow he is going to die, you must say that one day everyone is going to die, but in those who are dying do you count your own self?"

Another famous comment was about cross border terrorism while addressing haryana assembly.

"पहली बार जो गलती करे वो अज्ञान, दूसरी बार जो गलती करे वह नादान, तीसरी बार जो गलती करे वह शैतान, बार बार जो गलती करे वह पाकिस्तान, ओर हर बार जो क्षमा करे वो हिंदुस्तान।"

== Awards and titles ==
He has been declared a state guest in Madhya Pradesh (2002), Gujarat (2003), Maharashtra and Karnataka. He got the title of krantikari (revolutionary) at a religious gathering in Karnataka, and Rashtra Sant in 2003 in Indore, Madhya Pradesh.

== Legacy ==
On 29 July 2012, in Ahmedabad, the then Chief Minister of Gujarat Narendra Modi, presented the Tarun Kranti Puraskar to him.

== Reception ==
While he was in Karnataka, journalist Seetharam, in his column "Suttha Mutha" ridiculed Jainism and Jain Muni Tarun Sagar in the eveninger Karavali Ale, who was charged under sections 153 (A), 153 (B) and 295 (A) of Indian Penal Code.

In August 2016, Tarun Sagar was invited to address the Haryana Assembly by both the ruling BJP and the opposition Congress party members. He talked about social and political issues and evoked applause and laughter from lawmakers. The event caused a number of tweets critical of Muni Tarun Sagar because of his nudity. Most notable were the tweets by Vishal Dadlani, the musician and a leading AAP supporter, and the Congress leader Tehseen Poonawala. As a result, 27 police complaints were filed against Dadlani and Poonawala.

The AAP Chief Arvind Kejriwal quickly disassociated with Dadlani's comments stating "I met Shri Tarun Sagar ji Maharaj last year. Our family regularly listens to his discourses on TV. We deeply respect him and his thoughts...Tarun Sagar ji Maharaj is a very revered saint, not just for Jains but everyone. Those showing disrespect is unfortunate and should stop". Dadlani, realizing his mistake, vowed to quit politics and apologized 33 times on-line. Tarun Sagar defended the right of Dadlani to criticize him. In the same regards both Vishal Dadlani and Tehseen Poonawalla were fined of Rupees 10 lakh each for their remarks and tweets with warning not to repeat such instances in future by the Apex court of Justice.

== Death ==
Tarun Sagar took Sallekhana (fasted to death) on 1 September 2018 at age 51 after a long illness.
