= Akshaya Rao =

Indian Tamil actress

- Born: Chennai, Tamil Nadu, India
- Occupations: Actress, model
- Years active: 2003–present

Akshaya Rao is an Indian actress who has appeared in Tamil and Hindi films.

== Career ==
Akshaya Rao began her career as a supporting artiste alongside Simran in Kovilpatti Veeralakshmi (2003), before going on to appear in leading roles in Tamil films. Her most high-profile Tamil film till date is Kalabhak Kadhalan (2006), where she portrayed a negative role as the sister-in-law of Arya's character, who wants to seduce him. She continued to feature in low-budget Tamil films throughout the late 2000s, notably starring in Uliyin Osai (2008) written by Karunanidhi and the Vijayakanth-starrer Engal Aasan. By 2012, several of her other proposed films including Imbathukkum Aasai Varum, Manmadha Rajyam, Pattikattu Mappillai, Thasaiyinai Thee Sudinum and the Telugu film, Nakantu Okaru, were started but left incomplete.

In 2014, she featured in Sudeep Ranjan Sarkar's experimental Hindi film Umformung: The Transformation (2014), portraying the leading role. The film opened to critical acclaim and was shown at various film festivals internationally. She also worked as a director for the unreleased film Yaali (2018) co-starring Thaman Kumar.

== Filmography ==
| Year | Film | Role | Notes |
|---|---|---|---|
| 2003 | Kovilpatti Veeralakshmi | | |
| 2003 | Parthiban Kanavu | Mekala | |
| 2004 | Saga | | |
| 2006 | Manasukkule | Viji | |
| 2006 | Madrasi | Geetha | |
| 2006 | Kalabha Kadhalan | Kanmani | |
| 2008 | Pazhaniappa Kalloori | Madonna | |
| 2008 | Uliyin Osai | Muthunagai | |
| 2009 | Gaja | Pooja | |
| 2009 | Engal Aasan | Viji | |
| 2011 | Uyarthiru 420 | Savithri | |
| 2016 | Umformung: The Transformation | Kasthuri | Hindi film |
| TBA | Yaali | | Also director |
