= Sa Re Ga Ma Pa Hindi 2023 =

Indian reality television program

- Genre: Singing reality television
- Created by: Gajendra Singh
- Developed by: Gajendra Singh
- Creative director: Neeraj Sharma
- Presented by: Aditya Narayan
- Judges: Anu Malik; Himesh Reshammiya; Neeti Mohan
- Opening theme: Sa Re Ga Ma Pa Singing Superstar
- Country of origin: India
- Original language: Hindi
- No. of seasons: 31
- No. of episodes: 28 (list of episodes)

Production
- Producers: Zee Studios Television; Full Screen Entertainment
- Camera setup: Multi-camera
- Running time: 90 minutes
- Production company: Full Screen Entertainment

Original release
- Network: Zee TV; Zee5
- Release: 26 August – 26 November 2023

Related
- Sa Re Ga Ma Pa Hindi 2021; Sa Re Ga Ma Pa L'il Champs

Sa Re Ga Ma Pa 2023 is the 31st season of the longest running singing reality show of India Sa Re Ga Ma Pa that aired from 26 August 2023 till 26 November 2023 on Zee TV and digitally on Zee5. The season was won by Albert Lepcha with Nishtha Sharma being the runner-up.

== Auditions ==
The major auditions were went in July 2023 in major big cities of India.

The viewers had special chance to be spotted raw by judges in an auditions. In this launch the channel's Business Head Aparna Bhosle stated in an Interview with a media house "Over the years, our viewers have played an active role in shaping the journeys of their favorite contestants on Sa Re Ga Ma Pa through public voting that kicks in mid-season. However, the endeavour of involving our audience in nominating talent right from the auditions of this season lies in the insight that there is great joy in being a talent scout. Enabling audiences to spot and recommend talent to us not only ensures that we don't miss out on some rare, hidden gems while also turning our viewers into cheerleaders who will root for these contestants all through the season."

== Top 12 contestants ==
| Name | Hometown | Status | Date of Elimination | Position |
|---|---|---|---|---|
| Albert | West Bengal | Winner | 26 November 2023 | 1st |
| Nishtha Sharma | Sultanpur, Uttar Pradesh | 1st Runner Up | 26 November 2023 | 2nd |
| Ranita Banerjee | Kolkata, West Bengal | 2nd Runner-up | 26 November 2023 | 3rd |
| Sonia Gazmer | Kharagpur, West Bengal | 3rd Runner-up | 26 November 2023 | 4th |
| Sneha Bhattacharya | Kolkata, West Bengal | 4th Runner-up | 26 November 2023 | 5th |
| Abdul Sheikh | Mumbai | Eliminated | 18 November 2023 | 6th |
| Sana Arora | New Delhi | Eliminated | 18 November 2023 | 7th |
| Rik Basu | Kolkata, West Bengal | Eliminated | 18 November 2023 | 8th |
| Bullet B-One | Islampur, West Bengal | Eliminated | 4 November 2023 | 9th |
| Vejayalakshmi Puli | Bengaluru, Karnataka | Eliminated | 29 October 2023 | 10th |
| Vastav Kumar | Gurdaspur, Punjab | Eliminated | 15 October 2023 | 11th |
| Aaroh Shankar | New Delhi | Eliminated | 1 October 2023 | 12th |
| Karthik Kumar Krishnamurthy | Chennai | Judges Special Recommendation | | |

== Judges and host ==
The show is being judged by singer, composer, lyricist Anu Malik, Himesh Reshammiya and Indian Playback Singer Neeti Mohan while the show is hosted by Indian Playback Singer, Television presenter Aditya Narayan

== Original songs ==
The show introduced a new segment called OG Song which means every week 1 contestant will get a chance to record their Original Song and will release under Zee Music Company campaigned as a part of Zee Music Originals series in collaboration with Zee TV.

=== List of original songs released in Sa Re Ga Ma Pa 2023 ===
- Mere Soneya by Albert Lepcha
- Aap Hi Se Tha by Rik Basu
- Shamiyana by Sana Arora
- Maa Meri Maa by Karthik Kumar Krishnamurthy (Special Edition)
- Naina Mere Naina by Ranita Banerjee
- Hans Ke Milna by Nishtha Sharma
- Mangalwar by Sneha Bhattacharya
- Forever Waala Ishq by Nishtha Sharma (2nd OG Song)
- Tera Naam Lete Hain by Nishtha Sharma (3rd OG Song)
- Dekhte Dekhte by Albert Lepcha (2nd OG Song)
- Mujhe Duniya Se Kya Matlab by Sneha Bhattacharya (2nd OG Song)
- Gustaakh Aakhein by Sonia Gazmer
