= Sa Re Ga Ma Pa Hindi =

Singing reality show started in 1995

- Latest 25th anniversary cover photo
- Created by: Zee TV
- Creative directors: Zee TV, Gajendra Singh, Ashwini Karandikar, Supavitra Babul (2010), Neeraj Sharma
- Presented by: Sonu Nigam (1995-2000); Amaan Ali Khan and Ayaan Ali Khan (2000-01); Shaan (2002-06); Aditya Narayan (2007-09, 2014-2019,2021); Purab Kohli (2010); Manish Paul (2010, 2020); Javed Ali (2012-2013); Vipul Roy (2024); Salman Ali (2024); Shreyas Talpade (2026-Present)
- Opening theme: "Sa Re Ga Ma" by Sonu Nigam and Sadhana Sargam (1995-2000) "Sa Re Ga Ma Pa" by Shaan and Sadhana Sargam (2000-06) "Sa Re Ga Ma Pa" by Aditya Narayan and Shriram Iyer (2007-09) "Sa Re Ga Ma Pa" by Javed Ali (2010-2020) "Tu Gaaye Jaa" by Armaan Malik (2020-2022) "Sa Re Ga Ma Pa" by the judges of Sa Re Ga Ma Pa 2026 (2026-present)
- Country of origin: India
- No. of seasons: 39

Production
- Running time: 90 minutes (Including commercials)

Original release
- Network: Zee TV; Zee5
- Release: 1 May 1995 – present

Sa Re Ga Ma Pa is an Indian Hindi-language reality singing television show. It started airing on Zee TV in 1995 as Sa Re Ga Ma. It is the oldest running game show in India as well as the oldest show on private television in India. The name of the show is derived from the first five notes in the octave of classical Indian music.

== History ==
The first episode aired on 1 May 1995 and was hosted by Sonu Nigam. In the year 2000, the show was hosted by the Bangash brothers, Amaan Ali Bangash and Ayaan Ali Bangash, sons of sarod-player Amjad Ali Khan. From 2002, Shaan started hosting the show. Till 2005, the show used to follow a format wherein experts in the field of music would judge the contestants and score them. The format changed with the advent of Sa Re Ga Ma Pa Challenge 2005 which introduced the judges as mentors of different teams and scoring was primarily dependent on public voting. After Shaan quit hosting the show, the show was hosted by many others like Purab Kohli, Maniesh Paul, Karan Singh Rathore, Archana Jani, Vipul Roy, Jay Soni and even kids Dhairya Sorecha and Afsha Musani. The most prominent names to host the show in later seasons were Javed Ali and the current host Aditya Narayan.

== Overview ==
The show has seen multiple variations over the years:

- Sa Re Ga Ma: Contestants were scored only by the expert judges. There were 8 prelim (quarter-final) rounds, each consisting of 2 male singers and 2 female singers. One male winner and one female winner from each show competed in the semifinal rounds. There were 4 semifinal rounds where the 8 male and 8 female prelim winners participated. Each semifinal round had either 4 male or 4 female quarterfinal winners, so there were a total of 4 semifinals (2 semifinals with 4 males and 2 semifinals with 4 female singers). Each semifinal had only 1 winner. In the finals, the four semifinal winners, 2 male and 2 female competed against each other. Finally one male winner and one female winner became the winners of that season (also called a schedule).
- Sa Re Ga Ma Pa: 2 male singers, 2 female singers. The male and female winner would return the following episode and compete against a new challenger. At the start of this "roll-over" series, they had initially announced that anyone with over 10 wins would get an album; however, that never materialized.
- Sa Re Ga Ma Pa Challenge: Teams were formed, each Gharana (team) had a judge who mentored them. Elimination was decided by public voting.
- Sa Re Ga Ma Pa Ek Main Aur Ek Tu: A duet singing competition which featured some new contestants as well as old contestants from earlier seasons. Weekly elimination decided by public voting.
- Sa Re Ga Ma Pa L'il Champs: A singing competition for young children, which judges the prodigious kids on the basis of their voice quality, singing talent and versatility in performance.
- Sa Re Ga Ma Pa Popular Choice Awards: This was a special season in 2004 where previous season finalists and popular participants was invited to compete against each other. This season had both Male & a Female winner.
- Sa Re Ga Ma Pa Challenge USA: The first instalment of Sa Re Ga Ma Pa Challenge series in USA.
- Sa Re Ga Ma Pa Mega Challenge: A special season in which eight teams representing eight different states and consisting of total 24 talented contestants from past seasons of Sa Re Ga Ma Pa participated. The show was made to celebrate the 1000th episode of Sa Re Ga Ma Pa. Notable Indian singers and musicians were roped in to judge each of the episodes.

== Other Indian versions ==
Due to its success and popularity, it has been remade in languages including Marathi, Bengali, Kannada, Punjabi, Tamil, Odia, Telugu, Bhojpuri and Malayalam.Gujarati

== Seasons ==
#	Season	Year	Winner	Host	Judges
1	Sa Re Ga Ma - Schedule 1	1995	Sanjeevani Bhelande and Mukund Phansalkar Runner-ups - Tyagraj Khadilkar, Hamsika Iyer	Sonu Nigam	Kumar Sanu, Aadesh Shrivastava, Ravi, Raam Laxman, Suresh Wadkar, Anu Malik, Ravindra Jain, Nikhil-Vinay Semi-finals - Sameer & Dilip Sen, Jatin–Lalit, Nadeem Shravan, Hariharan Final - Khayyam
2	Sa Re Ga Ma - Schedule 2	1995	Nobina Mirjankar, Shivprasad Mallya Runner-ups - Mehboob Ali, Chetna Umarji	Sonu Nigam	Anup Jalota, Peenaz Masani, Mahendra Kapoor, Sapna Mukherjee, Anil Mohile, Anupama Deshpande, Chandan Das, Shailendra Singh Semi-finals - Jagjit Kaur, Viju Shah, Javed Akhtar, Usha Khanna Finals - Kalyanji-Anandji
	Sa Re Ga Ma 29th episode children's special	1995	Prashant Chauhan, Sneha Pant	Sonu Nigam	Ranu Mukherjee
3	Sa Re Ga Ma - Schedule 3	1995-96	Shaoni Mitra, Junaid Akhtar Runner-ups - Ameya Date, Sampa Das	Sonu Nigam	Abhijeet Bhattacharya, Ranjit Barot, Vani Jairam, Uttam Singh, Sachin Pilgaonkar, Vinod Rathod, Manhar Udhas Semi-finals - Roop Kumar Rathod, Kuldip Singh, Kavita Krishnamurthy, Ustad Ghulam Mustafa Khan Finals - Pt. Shivkumar Sharma
4	Sa Re Ga Ma - Schedule 4	1996	Mridula Chatterjee, Ravishankar Singh Runner-ups - Naresh, Deepali Somaiya	Sonu Nigam	Narendra Chanchal Finals - O.P. Nayyar
	Sa Re Ga Ma 50th episode celebration	1996	Sanjeevani Bhelande, Anagha, Lata Naidu, Soma Banerjee, Mukund Phalsankar, Jaswinder Singh, Sajjad Ali, Shailesh	Sonu Nigam	Asha Parekh
5	Sa Re Ga Ma	1996	Amrita Khadilkar, Swapnil Bandodkar	Sonu Nigam	Rajendra Rizvi Semi-finals - Pankaj Udhas Finals - Naushad
6	Sa Re Ga Ma	1996-97	Kajal Chandiramani, Ninad Mehta Runner-ups - Vijay Prakash, Smita Joshi	Sonu Nigam	Indivar, Sonik Omi, Arun Date Semi-finals - Begum Parveen Sultana Finals - Jagjit Singh
	Sa Re Ga Ma 75th episode children's special	1996	Shreya Ghoshal, Saagar Kendurkar	Sonu Nigam	Kalyanji-Anandji
7	Sa Re Ga Ma	1997	Rinku Kalia, Sanjeev Rambhadran Runner-ups - Dharna Pahwa, Devesh Chaturvedi	Sonu Nigam	Ustad Muhammad Hussain-Ahmed Hussain, Shobha Mudgal, Madhurani, Meena Kapoor Semi-finals - Pandit Rajan Mishra- Sajan Mishra, Dilshad Khan-Begum Parveen Sultana Finals - Anil Biswas
	Sa Re Ga Ma 100th episode celebration	1997		Sonu Nigam	
8	Sa Re Ga Ma	1997	Bela Shende, Parthiv Gohil Runner-ups - Dhananjay Bhatt, Devyani	Sonu Nigam	Ronu Majumdar, Rajkumari, S. P. Balasubrahmanyam, Daman Sood-Y.S. Mulky Semi-finals - Anuradha Paudwal Finals - Pt. Jasraj
9	Sa Re Ga Ma	1998	Sudeshna Ganguli, Mohammed Wakil Runner-ups - Abhijeet Ghoshal, Shalini	Sonu Nigam	Tejpal Singh-Surinder Singh, Vishal Bhardwaj Finals - Pt. Hariprasad Chaurasia
10	Sa Re Ga Ma 150th episode celebration Mega Finals	1998	Bela Shende, Mohammed Wakil Runner-ups - Mukund Phalsankar, Parthiv Gohil, Sanjeevani Bhelande, Sudeshna Ganguli	Sonu Nigam	Anil Biswas, Naushad, Kalyanji-Anandji, Pt. Jasraj, Pt. Hariprasad Chaurasia Jagjit Singh, Khayyam, Begum Parveen Sultana, Rajkumari, O.P. Nayyar
	Sa Re Ga Ma Mega Finals (Children's Special)	1998	Sneha Pant (Runner up - Shreya Ghoshal)	Sonu Nigam	Usha Mangeshkar, Meena Tai
11	Sa Re Ga Ma UK	1998-99	Siza Roy, Debashish Sengupta Runner-ups - Malini Awasthi, Asif	Sonu Nigam	Pandit Dinesh, Stephen Luscombe, Biddu Semi-finals - Suresh Wadkar Finals - Jagjit Singh, Ghulam Ali, Mehdi Hassan, Runa Laila, Farida Khanum
12	Sa Re Ga Ma	1998	Archana Udupa, Avadhoot Gupte Runner-ups - Gaurav Bangya, Poorva	Sonu Nigam	Chitra Semi-finals - Kishan Prasad Maharaj Finals - Pyarelal
	Sa Re Ga Ma Christmas New Year Celebration	1999		Sonu Nigam	Jagjit Singh, Ghulam Ali, Mehdi Hassan, Runa Laila, Farida Khanum, Kiki Dee
13	Sa Re Ga Ma 200th episode celebration Mega Finals	1999	Shreya Ghoshal, Jaswinder Singh Runner-ups - Archana Udupa, Sampa Kundu, Vijay Prakash, Ameya Date	Sonu Nigam	Zakir Hussain, Girja Devi, Anil Biswas, Vilayat Khan, Ram Narayan, Pandit Shivkumar Sharma
14	Sa Re Ga Ma USA	1999	Sangeeta Nerurkar, Nazakat Ali Runner-ups - Sharafat Ali, Maithili Panse, Divya Sampat	Sonu Nigam	Nitin Mukesh, Lakshmi Shankar, Alamelu Mani, Ustad Tari Khan Finals - Zakir Hussain, Manna Dey, Hariharan, Ustad Amjad Ali, Parvez Mehdi
	Sa Re Ga Ma Taj Mahal Millennium celebration	2000		Sonu Nigam	
15	Talent of the Millenium	2000	Sumant, Prajakta Joshi Runners Up - Suraj Singh, Ritu Chatterjee, Amrita	Sonu Nigam	Sanjeev Darshan, Sukhwinder Singh, Sajid-Wajid, Jaspinder Narula, Ayaan Ali Bangash, Amaan Ali Bangash, Arati Ankalikar Semi-finals - Poornima, Lalit Sen, Sandeep Chowta, Taufiq Qureshi, Sanjeev Abhyankar, Anoushka Shankar Finals - Pandit Ravi Shankar
16	Sa Re Ga Ma Pa 2001	2001	Anita Pundit	Amaan Ali Khan and Ayaan Ali Khan	
17	Sa Re Ga Ma Pa 2002	2002	Hricha Mukherjee (Hricha Debraj)	Shaan	Khayyam, Begum Parveen Sultana, Sitara Devi, Ranjit Barot, Shobha Gurtu, Anandji, Gulshan Bawra, Ghulam Mustafa
18	Sa Re Ga Ma Pa Popular Choice Awards	2004	Hrishikesh Ranade and Neha Rajpal	Shaan	
19	Sa Re Ga Ma Pa Campus Special	2005	Twinkle Bajpai, Manish Bhatt	Shaan	
20	Sa Re Ga Ma Pa Challenge 2005	2005	Debojit Saha	Shaan	Himesh Reshammiya, Jatin–Lalit, Aadesh Shrivastava, Ismail Darbar
21	Sa Re Ga Ma Pa Ek Main Aur Ek Tu	2006	Aishwarya Nigam and Ujjaini Mukherjee	Shaan, Ishita Arun	Hariharan, Lesle Lewis
22	Sa Re Ga Ma Pa L'il Champs	2006	Sanchita Bhattacharya	Shaan	Abhijeet Bhattacharya, Alka Yagnik, Bappi Lahiri
23	Sa Re Ga Ma Pa Challenge 2007	2007	Aneek Dhar	Aditya Narayan	Himesh Reshammiya, Ismail Darbar, Bappi Lahiri, Vishal–Shekhar
24	Sa Re Ga Ma Pa Li'l Champs International	2007	Anamika Choudhari	Aditya Narayan	Suresh Wadkar, Sonu Nigam
25	Sa Re Ga Ma Pa Challenge USA 2008	2008	Darshana Menon	Aishwarya Nigam	Suresh Wadkar, Aadesh Shrivastava
26	Sa Re Ga Ma Pa Challenge 2009	2009	Vaishali Mhade	Aditya Narayan	Himesh Reshammiya, Aadesh Shrivastava, Shankar Mahadevan, Pritam
27	Sa Re Ga Ma Pa Li'l Champs 2009	2009	Hemant Brijwasi	Dhairya Sorecha, Afsha Musani	Abhijeet Bhattacharya, Alka Yagnik
28	Sa Re Ga Ma Pa Mega Challenge	2009	Team Maharashtra - Vaishali Mhade, Kaushik Deshpande and Rohit Shyam Raut	Karan Singh Rathore and Archana Jani (first episode) Vipul Roy and Manish Paul	Sonu Nigam, Pyarelal and Suresh Wadkar (finale)
29	Sa Re Ga Ma Pa Singing Superstar	2010	Kamal Khan	Purab Kohli, Manish Paul	Daler Mehndi, Vishal–Shekhar, Sajid-Wajid
30	Sa Re Ga Ma Pa Li'l Champs 2011	2011	Azmat Hussain	Jay Soni	Adnan Sami, Kailash Kher, Javed Ali
31	Sa Re Ga Ma Pa Hindi 2012	2012	Jasraj Jayant Joshi	Javed Ali	Shankar Mahadevan, Rahul Ram, Sajid-Wajid
32	Sa Re Ga Ma Pa Li'l Champs 2014	2014	Gagan Gopalkrishna Gaonkar	Aditya Narayan	Alka Yagnik (Mahaguru), Shaan, Monali Thakur
33	Sa Re Ga Ma Pa 2016	2016	Kushal Paul Runner up -Sachin Kumar Valmiki	Aditya Narayan	Pritam, Sajid-Wajid, Mika
34	Sa Re Ga Ma Pa Li'l Champs 2017	2017	Shreyan Bhattacharya and Anjali Gaikwad	Aditya Narayan	Himesh Reshammiya, Javed Ali, Neha Kakkar
35	Sa Re Ga Ma Pa Hindi 2018	2018-2019	Ishita Vishwakarma	Aditya Narayan	Wajid Khan, Shekhar Ravjiani, Sona Mohapatra, Richa Sharma (Replaced Mohapatra)
36	Sa Re Ga Ma Pa Li'l Champs 2019	2019	Sugandha Date	Ravi Dubey	Shaan, Richa Sharma, Amaal Malik
37	Sa Re Ga Ma Pa Li'l Champs 2020	2020	Aryananda R Babu	Manish Paul	Alka Yagnik, Udit Narayan, Kumar Sanu, Himesh Reshammiya, Javed Ali (Replaced Narayan and Sanu)
38	Sa Re Ga Ma Pa Hindi 2021	2021-2022	Neelanjana Ray	Aditya Narayan	Himesh Reshammiya, Vishal Dadlani, Shankar Mahadevan
39	Sa Re Ga Ma Pa Li'l Champs 2022	2022-2023	Jetshen Dohna Lama	Bharti Singh	Shankar Mahadevan, Anu Malik, Neeti Mohan
40	Sa Re Ga Ma Pa Hindi 2023	2023	Albert Kabo Lepcha	Aditya Narayan	Himesh Reshammiya, Anu Malik, Neeti Mohan
41	Sa Re Ga Ma Pa 2024	2024-2025	Shradha Mishra(TeamSachinJigar) Runner-ups : - 1st - Subhashree Debnath 2nd - Ujwal Gujbhar 3rd - Bidisha Hatimuria 4th - Maharshi Pandya 5th - Parvathi Meenakshi	Vipul Roy, Salman Ali	Sachet–Parampara, Guru Randhawa, Sachin–Jigar
42	Sa Re Ga Ma Pa 2026	2026-present		Shreyas Talpade	Neeti Mohan, Javed Ali, Shankar Mahadevan & Kumar Sanu
