= Gajendra Singh (producer) =

Indian television producer and director

Gajendra Singh is an Indian television producer and director. His most popular shows include Antakshari, SaReGaMa and the recent Amul Music ka Maha Muqqabla and Sur Kshetra. He grew with Zee TV and took Indian Television to an international level. He appeared in "Limca book of Records" for making the longest running musical reality show "Antakshari" on Indian Television diaspora for 10 continuous years. This was followed by 'Sa Re Ga ' a show which he started with Amit Verma from Swastika Entertainment Private Limited, another longest running show along with the programs like India's Best Cinestar's ki Khoj and DID Lil' Champs also in collaboration with Amit Verma .

== Professional career ==
He is known for pioneering and popularizing game shows, and musical talent shows on Indian Television. He had a long and successful association with Zee TV till 2006. Due to some reasons he left Zee TV and commenced with Saaibaba Telefilms and created various projects with Star TV, Sony Entertainment Television Asia, SAB TV, Doordarshan, Sun TV Network and various other regional channels. He is from Azamgarh, Uttar Pradesh.

=== Saaibaba Telefilms ===
Saaibaba Telefilms is an Indian television company led by Gajendra Singh. The company produces reality television shows, fiction series, and live events.

=== Antakshari ===
Titan Antakshari - Intercollegiate Championship is an Indian musical game show that airs on Zee TV every Friday. The show is a replacement of the Titan Antakshari -L'il Champs.

=== Sa Re Ga Ma Pa ===
The first episode aired on 1 May 1995 and was hosted by Sonu Nigam.

=== STAR Voice Of India ===
Star Voice of India is an Indian Television singing talent hunt that premiered on 18 May 2007 and ended on 24 November 2007. It was the first Indian singing competition produced by STAR Plus. Voice of India 2 began on 18 July 2008.

== Television ==
Year	Shows	Notes
1993	Antakshari Intercollegiate Championship	
1993-2007	Antakshari (TV series)	
2003	Sa Re Ga Ma Pa: Golden Voice Hunt	with Zee TV
2003	Sa Re Ga Ma Pa Challenge 2005	with Zee TV
2006	Sa Re Ga Ma Pa Ek Main Aur Ek Tu	with Zee TV
2006	Sa Re Ga Ma Pa L'il Champs	with Zee TV
2008	Sa Re Ga Ma Pa Challenge USA 2008	
2008	Jo Jeeta Wohi Super Star	
2008	Junoon	
2008	Star Voice of India 2	
2009	Sa Re Ga Ma Pa Li'l Champs 2009	with Zee TV
2009-2010	Music Ka Maha Muqqabla	
2011	Sa Re Ga Ma Pa Li'l Champs 2011	with Zee TV
2012	Sur Kshetra	
2013	Ghar Aaja Pardesi	
2014	India's Raw Star	
2014	Sa Re Ga Ma Pa Li'l Champs 2014	with Zee TV
2017	Sa Re Ga Ma Pa Li'l Champs 2017	with Zee TV
2019	Sa Re Ga Ma Pa Li'l Champs 2019	
