= Nabeel Shaukat Ali =

Pakistani singer

Nabeel Shaukat Ali نبيل شوکت علی
- Born: Nabeel Shaukat Ali; 29 August 1989 (age 37); Lahore, Pakistan
- Genres: Ghazal; filmi
- Occupation: Singer
- Instrument: Vocals
- Years active: 2011–present

Nabeel Shaukat Ali (Urdu: نبیل شوکت علی; born 29 August 1989) is a Pakistani singer. He won Sur Kshetra, a singing talent show – the musical battle between teams of two neighboring countries: Pakistan and India aired simulcast on Geo TV, Sahara One, Colors TV, AAG TV as well as Rishtey.

== Personal life ==
He and his family resided in the UAE but he came back to Pakistan, so that Nabeel could learn music. He followed the veteran singer Mohammed Rafi during his childhood. All of these events were revealed by Nabeel himself when he attended the show Rewind with Samina Peerzada as a guest.

== Career ==
Nabeel Shaukat Ali wanted to be a singer since his childhood. His first appearance was in Azme Alishan National Song Competition (Season 2), in which he performed in front of top Pakistani musicians like Strings and Arshad Mehmood and was declared the winner in 2011.

After that, he participated in the 2012 singing competition Sur Kshetra. There were 5 finalist chairs at the start of the show. Sara Raza Khan was the first contestant to sit on a finalist chair based on the decision of the jury. Mulazim Hussain became the second finalist after winning the face off. Yashraj Kapil sat on the third finalist chair as the captain Himesh Reshammiya left it up to the judges to decide the third finalist from his team. Budhaditya Mukherjee became the fourth finalist after winning the face off for the fourth chair. The battle for the fifth chair turned out to be the most exciting as Nabeel from Pakistan and Diljaan from 'Team India' went head to head in the face-off. There was a lot of drama after the face-off as both the contestants sang really well, and it became very tough for the jury members to decide who should be the fifth finalist. Asha Bhosle wanted Diljaan to be the finalist, while Abida Parveen wanted Nabeel to be the fifth finalist. The neutral judge Runa Laila refused to take the decision and threatened to walk out of the show. After much drama, it was finally decided that there would be six finalists instead of five, and hence both Diljaan and Nabeel made it to the finals.

In the Grand Finale, Nabeel Shaukat Ali won the title by beating Diljaan in the face-off round due to his versatility.

== Reality show ==
Year	Show	Role	Result
2012	Sur Kshetra	Contestant	Won

== Discography ==
Year	Song	Note(s)
2011	"Hai Yeh Pakistan"	Azme Alishan Productions
2011	"Jeet Loo"	World Cup Song
2013	"Hip Hip Hurray"	Devar Bhabhi
2013	"Yeh Kaghazi Phool Jaise Chehray"	Devar Bhabhi
2013	"Tum Wohi Ho Lo Aaj Bata Detay Hain"	Devar Bhabhi
2013	"Agar Shukk Dil Mein Ajaye"	Shukk title song
2014	"Aik Pal"	Aik Pal title song
2014	"Bhool"	Bhool title song
2015	"Dil Ka Kya Rung Karun"	Dil Ka Kya Rung Karun title song
2015	"Aaj Se"	Music Video
2015	"Bewajah"	Music Video
2015	"Sohni Dharti Allah Rakhey"	Coke Studio Pakistan (season 8)
2015	"Umran Langiyaan"	Coke Studio Pakistan (season 8)
2015	"Bewajah"	Coke Studio Pakistan (season 8)
2015	"Maana Ka Gharana"	Maana Ka Gharana title song
2015	"Aisa Jorh Hai"	Jawani Phir Nahi Ani
2015	"Tum Mere kya Ho"	Tum Mere Kya Ho title song
2015	"Dheere Dheere"	Wrong No.
2015	Naachey Mann	Wrong No.
2016	"Lahore Qalanders Anthem"	Sung for Pakistan Super League
2016	"Bulleya"	Music Video
2016	"Kooch"	Music Video
2016	"Hatheli"	Hatheli title song
2016	"Khwab Saraye"	Khwab Saraye title song
2016	"Dil Aitbar"	Khwab Saraye ending theme
2016	"Choti si Zindagi"	Choti Si Zindagi title song
2017	"Meharmaan"	Raasta
2017	"Rabba"	Wo Aik Pal title Song
2017	"National Anthem"	Coke Studio (Season 10)
2017	"Mujhse Pehli Si Muhabbat"	Coke Studio (Season 10)
2017	"Ruseya Rawe"	Music video
2018	"Sawaal"	Music video
2018	"Dukh Mere Aas Pas"	Tabeer title song
2018	"Rubaru Ishq Tha"	Rubaru Ishq Tha
2019	"Kyun Hai Inkaar"	Music video
2019	"Ja Tujhy Maaf Kiya"	Do Bol title song
2019	"Yaariyan"	Yaariyan title song
2024	"Duur Na Karin"	sung for Khel Khel Mein with co-singer Vishal Mishra, Zahrah S Khan
2026	"Alvida Alvida"	Dar-e-Nijaat
