= Sa Re Ga Ma Pa Hindi 2021 =

Indian reality television program

- Genre: Singing reality television
- Created by: Gajendra Singh
- Developed by: Gajendra Singh
- Directed by: Amit Puri
- Creative director: Neeraj Sharma
- Presented by: Aditya Narayan
- Judges: Vishal Dadlani; Himesh Reshammiya; Shankar Mahadevan
- Theme music composer: Amaal Malik
- Opening theme: Sa Re Ga Ma Pa
- Country of origin: India
- Original language: Hindi
- No. of seasons: 30
- No. of episodes: 40 (list of episodes)

Production
- Producers: Zee Studios Television; The Content Team
- Camera setup: Multi-camera
- Running time: 90 minutes
- Production company: Zee Studios Television

Original release
- Network: Zee TV
- Release: 16 October 2021 – 6 March 2022

Related
- Sa Re Ga Ma Pa Hindi 2018; Sa Re Ga Ma Pa L'il Champs

Sa Re Ga Ma Pa 2021 was the 30th season of the longest running singing reality show of India Sa Re Ga Ma Pa that aired on 16 October 2021 to 6 March 2022.

== Auditions ==
The channel started taking auditions for the 30th season from 15 July 2021 through "Missed Call Based Link Providing Method" and invites young aspiring singers to take part on the show. The auditions gets closed on 15 August 2021.

== Judges ==
The channel approaches Himesh Reshammiya, Vishal Dadlani and Shankar Mahadevan as the judging panel for its 30th season.

== Judges and host ==
Judges and host
Shankar Mahadevan	Judge
Himesh Reshammiya	Judge
Vishal Dadlani	Judge
Aditya Narayan	Host

The channel first announces Aditya Narayan as the host of the upcoming season and Aditya Narayan also confirmed that news but later on some media reports claiming that Narayan is quitting his hosting career and he wants to work for Grammy Awards, however there's no official confirmation about quitting this season comes yet from Zee TV. On 18 September, the channel releases its official trailer on YouTube and confirmed officially that Narayan will host the show.

Talking about the show, Narayan says, "Sa Re Ga Ma Pa is like a homecoming for me. It's a show that I have been associated with for a really long time and the stage is just like home to me. I have hosted nearly seven seasons of this show, right from 2007 to 2018. When I was just about 18 years old, my first ever job in the television Industry was with Sa Re Ga Ma Pa."

== Top 16 Contestants ==
Contestants	Hometown	Status	Date of Elimination
Neelanjana Ray	Alipurduar	Winner	6 March 2022
Rajashri Bag	Hooghly	1st Runner Up	6 March 2022
Sharad Sharma	Ganj Basoda	2nd Runner Up	6 March 2022
Sanjana Bhat	Delhi	Finalist	6 March 2022
Snigdhajit Bhowmik	Buniadpur	Finalist	6 March 2022
Ananya Chakraborty	Kolkata	Finalist	6 March 2022
Sachin Kumar Valmiki	Lakhimpur Kheri	Quit	5 March 2022
Laj	Hoshiarpur	Eliminated	20 February 2022
Vraj Kshatriya	Vadodara	Eliminated	23 January 2022
Dipaayan Banerjee	Kolkata	Eliminated	23 January 2022
Yumna Ajin	Kerala	Eliminated	26 December 2021
Anshika Chonkar	Dombivili	Eliminated	26 December 2021
Raje Baghsawar Nadaf	Kolhapur	Eliminated	5 December 2021
Aravind Nair	Kerala	Eliminated	5 December 2021
Farhan Sabir	Delhi	Eliminated	28 November 2021
Kinjal Chatterjee	Kolkata	Eliminated	28 November 2021

== Grand jury ==
Grand Jury
- Arpita Mukherjee
- Pawni Pandey
- Sumedha Karmahe
- Hamsika Iyer
- Hrishikesh Chury
- Rishikesh Kamerkar
- Debojit Saha
- Soham Chakrabarty
- Kiran Kamath
- Arvinder Singh Arv
- Torsha Sarkar
- Puja Chatterjee
- Padma Wadkar
- Suzanne D'Mello
- Shabab Sabri
- Sanchita Bhattacharya
- Sudhakar Sharma
- Aneek Dhar
- Bishakh Jyoti
- Bhavya Pandit
- Ram Shankar
- Vaishali Mhade
- Shabbir Ahmed
- Vinod Hasal
- Uvie
- Sairam Iyer
- Yashita Yashpal Sharma
- Prashant Ingole
- Pragya Dasgupta
- Paroma Dasgupta
- Nanu Gurjar
- June Banerjee
- Raktima Mukherjee
