= Shweta Agarwal =

Indian actress

- Education: University of Mumbai
- Occupation: Actress
- Years active: 2002–2010
- Spouse: Aditya Narayan (m. 2020)
- Children: 1
- Relatives: Udit Narayan (father-in-law)

Shweta Agarwal Jha (née Agarwal) is an Indian former actress who has appeared in feature films such as Raghavendra (2003), Tandoori Love (2008), and Shaapit (2010).

== Personal life ==
She is married to singer and host Aditya Narayan, the son of Udit Narayan.

== Filmography ==
=== Films ===
Key
†	Denotes films that have not yet been released

Year	Film	Role	Language	Notes
2002	Allari	Aparna "Appu"	Telugu	
2003	Kiccha	Suma	Kannada	
2003	C.I.D. Moosa		Malayalam	Special appearance in song "James Bondin Deto
2003	Raghavendra	Mahalakshmi	Telugu	
2008	Tandoori Love	Priya	Swiss	
2008	Gamyam	Mandhaaram	Telugu	Special appearance in the song "Hatteri Chintamani"
2008	Miras	Ayşa	Turkish	
2010	Shaapit	Kaaya Shekhawat	Hindi	

=== Television ===
Year	Title	Role	Notes	Ref.
2004–2005	Dekho Magar Pyaar Se	Nikita "Nikki" Sareen	Later replaced by Shraddha Nigam	
