= Sa Re Ga Ma Pa Hindi 2018 =

Indian reality television show

- Music Se Bane Hum
- Created by: Zee TV
- Presented by: Aditya Narayan
- Judges: Shekhar Ravjiani; Sona Mohapatra(left early); Wajid Khan; Richa Sharma(replaced Mohapatra)
- Country of origin: India
- Original language: Hindi
- No. of seasons: 27th season
- No. of episodes: 30

Production
- Producer: Essel Vision Productions
- Running time: 90 minutes

Original release
- Network: Zee TV
- Release: 13 October 2018 – 27 January 2019

Related
- Sa Re Ga Ma Pa 2016; Sa Re Ga Ma Pa Hindi 2021

Sa Re Ga Ma Pa is an Indian musical reality TV show. It started airing on Zee TV in 1995 as Sa Re Ga Ma. It is the oldest running singing reality show in India. Sa Re Ga Ma Pa 2018 aired on 13 October 2018 on Zee TV. It was originally judged by Shekhar Ravjiani, Wajid Khan and Sona Mohapatra. Mohapatra was replaced by Richa Sharma in November 2018 due to prior commitments.

== Top 15 finalists and 3 wildcards ==
- Ishita Vishwakarma – "Team Shekhar" (Winner)
- Tanmay Chaturvedi – "Team Sona/Team Richa" (1st Runner Up)
- Sonu Gill – "Team Wajid" (2nd Runner Up)
- Sahil Solanki – "Team Sona/Team Richa" (Top 6)
- Aishwarya Pandit – "Team Wajid" (Top 6)
- Aslam Abdul Majeed (wild card) – "Team Sona/Team Richa"(Top 6)
- Jyoti Sharma (wild card) (Eliminated) – "Team Wajid"
- Anmol Jaswal (wild card)(Eliminated) – "Team Shekhar"
- Gurbinder Singh (Eliminated) – "Team Wajid"
- Rajvinder Kaur (Quit) – "Team Wajid"
- Pratiksha Deka (Eliminated) – "Team Shekhar"
- Mandakini Takhellambam (Eliminated) – "Team Shekhar"
- Menuka Poudel (Eliminated) – "Team Shekhar"
- Bharat K Rajesh (Eliminated) – "Team Sona/Team Richa"
- Suprit Chakraborty (Eliminated) – "Team Sona/Team Richa"
- Maharshi Pandya (Eliminated) – "Team Shekhar"
- Anushka Banerjee (Eliminated) – "Team Wajid"

== Grand Jury ==
- Arpita Mukherjee
- Pawni Pandey
- Sumedha Karmahe
- Hamsika Iyer
- Hrishikesh Chury
- Rishikesk Kamerkar
- Asees Kaur
- Debojit Saha
- Soham Chakrabarty
- Kiran Kamath
- Raman Sir
- Arvinder Singh
- Divya Kumar
- Padma Wadkar
- Suzanne D'Mello
- Shabab Sabri
