= Antakshari (TV series) =

- The "Titan Antakshari" logo featuring Sameer, Sanchita and Diwakar.
- Created by: Gajendra Singh
- Directed by: Gajendra Singh
- Starring: Annu Kapoor; Pallavi Joshi; Sunil Pal; Himani Kapoor; Renuka Shahane
- Opening theme: "Ye Hai Antakshari"
- Country of origin: India

Production
- Editor: Gajendra Singh
- Running time: approx. 52 minutes

Original release
- Network: Zee TV
- Release: September 10, 1993 – July 6, 2007

Antakshari, also known as Zee Antakshari, was an Indian weekly musical game show that aired on Zee TV from 1993 to 2007. It was created by Gajendra Singh. It was host by Annu Kapoor from 1994 to 2005 with various co-hosts. It was well received.

== Production ==
The musical game show was created by Gajendra Singh. Annu Kapoor host the show from 1994 to 2005, along with co-hosts such as Rajeshwari Sachdev (1994-2001), Pallavi Joshi (2001-2005), Durga Jasraj, Renuka Shahane and Shefali Chhaya, among others. Later it was host by Himani Kapoor and Sunil Pal in 2007. Karan Oberoi (singer) replaced Pal.

It was filmed in locations such as Dubai, London and New York.

== Setup ==
The show is based on traditional parlor game Antakshari. Each episode featured three teams; Deewane, Parwane and Mastane; with two contestants in each. It featured old and new Hindi film songs. It had rounds such as Prelude, Dhun and Remix, etc. It was one of the earliest shows to feature celebrity special episodes.

=== Title sponsors ===
- Close-Up Toothpaste (1993-1994, 1996-2002)
- Fair-Deal Furniture (1995)
- Sansui Electric (2003-2005)
- Titan Watches (2006-2007)

== Other media ==
The show was also adapted as a radio show BIG Antakshari on 92.7 BIG FM and was hosted by Annu Kapoor.

== Reception ==
The show was hit. Annu Kapoor sang more than 4,000 songs during the show. He became a household name in India.

== Crew ==
Gajendra Singh

Ashwini Karandikar

Santosh Shendye

Aanchal Bhatnagar

Raj Vishwakarma

Nandu Mhadolkar

Gyan Sahay

Maruti Shinde

Ashwyn Balsaver

Rajan Dange

Anand Sharma

Guru Patil
