= Tandoori Love =

2008 film by Oliver Paulus

- Poster
- Directed by: Oliver Paulus
- Written by: Stefan Hillebrand; Oliver Paulus
- Produced by: Valerie Fischer
- Starring: Lavinia Wilson; Vijay Raaz; Martin Schick; Shweta Agarwal
- Cinematography: Daniela Knapp
- Edited by: André Bigoudi; Isabel Meier
- Music by: Marcel Vaid
- Production companies: Cobra Film AG; Pandora Filmproduktions; Schweizer Fernsehen; Teleclub AG
- Release date: 12 December 2008
- Running time: 92 minutes
- Country: Switzerland
- Language: English; Swiss German

Tandoori Love is a 2008 Swiss comedy film about the misadventures of an Indian cook named Raja in Switzerland. The film, directed by Oliver Paulus, was called Switzerland's first "Bollywood film". It premiered at the 2008 Goa film festival.

== Plot ==
In the Bernese Oberland, Sonja works as sommelier at "L'Auberge du Cerf", the restaurant owned by her boyfriend Martin. She meets Rajah, an Indian cook, with whom she falls in love. Rajah's cooking is soon integrated in the menu of the restaurant and receives immense success. But the original employer of the cook, Priya, a Mumbai actress, arrives and insists that Rajah is to go back with her to India.

== Cast ==
- Lavinia Wilson as Sonja
- Vijay Raaz as Rajah
- Martin Schick as Markus
- Shweta Agarwal as Priya
- Tamal Ray Chowdhury as Kamaal Khan
- Max Rüdlinger as Gusti
- Peter Glauser as Stammtisch Stöff
- René Blum as Karli
- Verena Zimmermann as Rosmarie Kübli
- Asif Basra as T.V. Kumar, the producer
- Aasif Sheikh as Superstar Ramesh
- Gilles Tschudi as Jules Renaud
- Ganesh Yadav as J.R., the director
- Asha Sachdev as Priya's mother
- Johanna Bantzer as Anita

== Reception ==
A critic from SBS wrote that "It makes for an awkward film, but it’s buoyed by an idiosyncratic outlook". A critic from Internet Review wrote that the film was "A delightful and silly little fairy tale".

A review in the Berliner Zeitung found the premise promising but the plot weak and the mixing of cultural and acting peculiarities not harmonious in the whole.
