= Sa Re Ga Ma Pa Challenge 2009 =

- Season 2009
- Promotional logo
- Starring: Aadesh Shrivastava; Himesh Reshammiya; Shankar Mahadevan; Pritam
- No. of episodes: Total 54

Release
- Original network: Zee TV
- Original release: 4 July 2008 – 24 January 2009

Hero Honda - Sa Re Ga Ma Pa Challenge 2009 is the 3rd installment of the Sa Re Ga Ma Pa Challenge series which premiered on 4 July 2008 on Zee TV. The show is hosted by Aditya Narayan, who also hosted the previous competition Sa Re Ga Ma Pa Challenge 2007. This show features two new mentors, Shankar Mahadevan and Pritam, who join Himesh Reshammiya, who was a judge in the previous edition. Aadesh Shrivastava, who was earlier a judge in Sa Re Ga Ma Pa Challenge 2005, returns to this season.

== Chakravyuh ==
Chakravyuh is the name that represents the preliminary rounds of the contest. The idea is to have every contestant perform in front of a 'Mahaguru' and try for a qualification to round two of the contest vocal test by Milind Dabholkar (Organ-Synthesizer player)

Every week, two contestants from each Gharana were selected to perform in front of the judges and the 'Mahaguru'. Considering that there are four Gharanas, total of eight contestants perform in the first episode of the week. Out of the eight contestants, the top two singers, judged by the 'Mahaguru', qualify for the next round of the competition. The remaining six contestants are then asked to perform again in the second episode of the week, out of which the bottom two contestants are eliminated from the show. The remaining four then advance to the next round.

== Sanjeevini Booti ==
'Sanjeevini Booti' is the name used as 'lifeline' in the show. It means that the judges have authority to offer another chance to an eliminated contestant. Only one lifeline will be offered in a week to one of the two eliminated contestants. All the contestants will then have to perform again and only one of them will be selected for the next round.

=== Round 1 ===
The following contestants got 'Sanjeevini Booti' in the first round of the competition.

- Rashi Ragshree (Dhoom): Week 2 - Eliminated (26 July; Episode 8)
- Shashi Sumon (Jai Ho): Week 3 - Eliminated (29 August; Episode 17)
- Jeffrey Iqbal (Lakshya): Week 4 - Eliminated (26 July; Episode 8)

All three contestants performed in week 4 and Shashi Suman from Jai Ho gharana got selected for second round of the competition.

=== Round 2 ===
The following contestants got 'Sanjeevini Booti' in the second round of the competition.

- Faraz Butt (Jai Ho): Week 5
- Tarun Sagar (Lakshya): Week 6 Eliminated (22 August; Episode 15)
- Sayon Chaudhary (Jai Ho): Week 7 Eliminated (23 August; Episode 16)

== Results ==
Contestant	Gharana	Elimination date
Vaishali Mhade	Jai Mata Di Let's Rock Gharana	Winner
Yashita Yashpal Sharma	Dhoom Gharana	Finalist
Shoumen Nandi	Jai Ho Gharana	Finalist
Pratibha Baghel	Lakshya Gharana	2 January 2009
Debojit Dutta	Dhoom Gharana	26 December 2008
Asma Mohammed Rafi	Jai Mata Di Let's Rock Gharana	19 December 2008
Zaheer Abbas	Jai Mata Di Let's Rock Gharana	12 December 2008
Sara Raza Khan	Lakshya Gharana	7 November 2008
Tarun Sagar	Jai Mata Di Let's Rock Gharana	31 October 2008
Shujat Ali Khan	Dhoom Gharana	24 October 2008
Kaushik Deshpande	Lakshya Gharana	17 October 2008
Naina Saxena	Lakshya Gharana	10 October 2008
Faraz Butt	Jai Ho Gharana	3 October 2008
Mitika Kanwar	Dhoom Gharana	26 September 2008
Deepali Sathe	Jai Ho Gharana	6 September 2008
Anupama Malhotra	Jai Ho Gharana	5 September 2008
Sunvinder Singh	Jai Mata Di Let's Rock Gharana	30 August 2008
Arshad Mohammad	Dhoom Gharana	30 August 2008
Fareed Ahmed	Jai Mata Di Let's Rock Gharana	29 August 2008
Shashi Suman	Jai Ho Gharana	29 August 2008
Manisha Karmakar	Jai Mata Di Let's Rock Gharana	23 August 2008
Sayan Chaudhauri	Jai Ho Gharana	23 August 2008
Jenice Sobti	Jai Mata Di Let's Rock Gharana	22 August 2008
Pallavi Suri	Jai Mata Di Let's Rock Gharana	16 August 2008
Prachi Shah	Dhoom Gharana	9 August 2008
Arindom Chatterjee	Jai Ho Gharana	29 August 2009
Pooja Goswami	Jai Ho Gharana	2 August 2008
Darshana Menon	Jai Mata Di Let's Rock Gharana	26 July 2008
Rashi Ragshree	Dhoom Gharana	26 July 2008
Jeffery Iqbal	Lakshya Gharana	26 July 2008
Snehandhu Naskar	Lakshya Gharana	12 July 2008

=== Ekalavya Gharana ===
Anurag Girish Dhoundeyal
Divya Kumar
Farhan Zaidi
Imran Abbas
Medha Krishna
Noor Al Ain Wahid
Shueli Sammadder
