= Shaapit =

- Film poster
- Directed by: Vikram Bhatt
- Written by: Vikram Bhatt; Girish Dhamija
- Story by: Vikram Bhatt
- Produced by: Vikram Bhatt; Manmohan D Singh
- Starring: Aditya Narayan; Rahul Dev; Shweta Agarwal; Shubh Joshi; Murli Sharma; Nishigandha Wad
- Cinematography: Pravin Bhatt
- Edited by: Kuldeep Mehan
- Music by: Chirantan Bhatt; Najam Sheraz; Aditya Narayan
- Production company: ASA Productions and Enterprises Pvt. Ltd.
- Release date: 19 March 2010
- Running time: 136 minutes
- Country: India
- Language: Hindi

Shaapit (transl. Cursed) is a 2010 Indian Hindi-language romantic horror adventure film directed by Vikram Bhatt, starring debutant Aditya Narayan, Rahul Dev, Shweta Agarwal (in her final film appearance) and Shubh Joshi in the lead roles. The film is based on the story of a family whose daughters have been carrying a curse from generation to generation. It also stars Murali Sharma and Nishigandha Wad. This film was shot in Film City and released on 19 March 2010, under the banner of ASA Film Pvt Ltd.

According to Bhatt, this is the third film in his horror trilogy after Raaz and 1920.

== Plot ==
Aman, seemingly lifeless, narrates how he and his sweetheart Kaya are doomed to perish together. He remembers happier times when he met, courted and finally proposed to Kaya. No sooner than he had proposed, they supernaturally met with a sudden car accident, suffering only minor injuries. But when Kaya's parents realise Aman has proposed to her, they reveal the curse upon their family. Kaya's father is a descendant of a royal family. Some 300 years ago, the brother of the late king Rana Ranjit Singh had attempted to molest a beautiful girl in the palace. The girl escaped and jumped to her death. It turned out that the girl was the daughter of the royal guru, Acharya Sachidanand, and that the girl was about to be wed. The acharya, a wise and powerful spiritual master, pronounced a terrible curse upon Ranjit Singh: no daughter in Ranjit Singh's line shall ever enjoy marriage; if they ever attempt to marry or become engaged, they will immediately meet with death.

Aman, Kaya and their friend Shubh reach out to Professor Pashupati, an expert in the occult, who explains that generational curses (such as the one upon Kaya) are typically connected with an evil spirit. This spirit is the keeper of the curse, and it executes the curse (by taking the lives of the victims). Aman recollects that the evil spirit had caused their car accident. Aman suggested destroying the spirit. The bemused professor laughs this off and urges Aman to forget Kaya and move on. However, a persistent Aman looks up some of the professor's work and retrieves (in a dangerous chase with a violent spirit) a "cursed" book from the library. Convinced that Aman is determined and capable, the professor agrees to help them. Their first stop is an abandoned cinema. The professor explains that it is haunted by several spirits, and some of the noble spirits may be able to help them locate the evil curse-keeper. Aman and Kaya enter the theatre. They are surrounded by spirits, and one of them splatters a few drops of blood on Kaya's wrists. The professor interprets: the drops are the coordinates of the ancient kingdom of Magha, present-day Mahipalpur.

They arrive at Mahipalpur and settle into the decrepit government guest house. The evil spirit attacks Kaya and tries to bury her alive. She is rescued but goes into hypoxic shock. The professor sends Shubh's consciousness back in time using a water-immersion method, and the latter is attacked by the spirit, but this time he returns with key information about an amulet revealing the clue that leads them to Rani Mohini, the evil spirit, the keeper of the curse. Aided by the curator of the 300-year-old Magha jail, the professor performs a seance to invoke the spirit of Ranjit Singh, and it is revealed that Rani Mohini was never satisfied with her station as the second wife of Raja Gajsingh. She was also a sorceress. She plotted to assassinate the King and his two sons, Rana Ranjeet Singh and Kuljeet. Her assassins killed Raja Gajsingh but were ultimately defeated and killed by the royal guard. Ranjit Singh ascended the throne, and, upon learning of Rani Mohini's dark powers, promptly arranged to execute her. Rani Mohini, however, created a diabolically careful plan for revenge and to keep her soul on earth. Upon her execution, her spirit possessed Kuljeet and led acharya's daughter to death, prompting acharya to curse Ranjit Singh's lineage and became the keeper of the curse to forever torment Ranjit Singh's family.

Kaya's condition worsens. The professor, Aman, and Shubh hurry into the River Palace to confront the evil spirit of Rani Mohini. They learn from Ranjit Singh that the spirit of Mohini can be dispatched to the nether world only when her mortal remains (ashes) are dissolved. They retrieve the pot containing her ashes, but Mohini's spirit brutally kills the professor and chases them to foil their efforts. The pot is destroyed, but Aman floods the River Palace and nearly drowns, but Shubh saves him just in time. Kaya survives and marries Aman, and they are later blessed with a daughter.

== Cast ==
- Aditya Narayan as Aman Bhargav
- Shweta Agarwal as Kaaya Shekhawat
- Rahul Dev as Professor Pasupathy
- Shubh Joshi as Shubh
- Murli Sharma as Kaaya's father
- Nishigandha Wad as Kaaya's mother
- Prithvi Zutshi as Aman's father
- Natasha Sinha as Rani Mohini
- Ashok Beniwal as Raza, Curator of Jail Museum
- Sanjay Sharma
- Mamik Singh

== Soundtrack ==
The music is composed by Chirantan Bhatt, Aditya Narayan and Najam Sheraz.

=== Track listing ===
No.	Title	Lyrics	Music	Singer(s)	Length
1.	"Kabhi Na Kabhi To Miloge" (Rock)	Sameer	Chirantan Bhatt	Aditya Narayan	5:01
2.	"Tere Bina Jiya Na Jaye"	Najam Sheraz	Najam Sheraz	Najam Sheraz	4:49
3.	"Ajnabi Hawaayein"	Sameer	Chirantan Bhatt	Shreya Ghoshal	4:42
4.	"Chaahata Kitna Tumko Dil"	Sameer & Jaspreet Kohli	Chirantan Bhatt	Aditya Narayan, Jaspreet Kohli, Suzanne D'Mello & Chirantan Bhatt	4:41
5.	"Hayaati Ye Hayaati Kehati"	Sameer	Chirantan Bhatt	Hamza Faruqui & Chirantan Bhatt	4:44
6.	"Kabhi Na Kabhi To Miloge"	Sameer	Chirantan Bhatt	Aditya Narayan & Suzanne D'Mello	6:17
7.	"Shaapit Hua Kya Kya Hota Hai"	Aditya Narayan	Aditya Narayan	Aditya Narayan & Sunidhi Chauhan	3:29

== Reception ==
The Times of India rated the film three stars out of five and considered that: "The film works not so much due to its story. Rather, it's the way Vikram Bhatt tells his story -- with a certain polish and pizzazz -- that draws you in. Also, it's Pravin Bhatt's multi-hued cinematography which adds a lyrical quality to the film. Not much of a debut however for Shweta Agarwal, who spends much of the screen time in comatose, though Aditya Narain is adequate."

The Indian Express gave the film one star out of five and Shubhra Gupta wrote: "Practically nothing about `Shaapit', which has the youngest looking debutant hero after Shahid Kapoor, is scary : not the bag of skeletons which floats around a 300 year old castle, not the wailing and the screeching, and the moaning and the groaning."

Mid-Day considered: "The basic plot of the film seems lost somewhere the curse and the evil spirit are supposed to have a connection but that remains unexplained. It's almost like two separate tracks in the same film and that makes it hard to comprehend" and commented "The director's scare tactics work big time in the first half the sequence with Aman alone in the library is the most thrilling of the lot. Also, Shaapit is a combination of a love story and a horror flick, and it works." Mid-Day rated the film two and a half stars out of five.

Taran Adarsh writing for Bollywood Hungama commented: "With SHAAPIT, Vikram Bhatt raises the bar for horror films made in India. Full marks to Bhatt for making that one kick-ass horror thriller, which easily ranks amongst the best in this genre in terms of plot, setting, technique and performances" and ranked the film three and a half stars out of five.

== Awards and nominations ==
2011 Zee Cine Awards

Nominated

- Best Male Debut – Aditya Narayan

3rd Mirchi Music Awards

Nominated

- Upcoming Male Vocalist of The Year - Najam Sheraz - "Tere Bina Jiya Na Jaye"
