= Sa Re Ga Ma Pa L'il Champs =

Indian reality television singing competition

- Created by: Zee TV, Gajendra Singh
- Presented by: Aditya Narayan; Ravi Dubey; Manish Paul
- Opening theme: "Sa Re Ga Ma Pa L'il Champs"
- Country of origin: India
- Original language: Hindi
- No. of seasons: 9

Production
- Running time: 45 minutes

Original release
- Network: Zee TV
- Release: 8 July 2006

Related
- Sa Re Ga Ma Pa

Sa Re Ga Ma Pa L'il Champs, is a sub-series of Sa Re Ga Ma Pa, it is a singing competition television series, which airs on Zee TV. Young children participate in this show and are judged on the basis of their voice quality, singing talent and versatility in their performance.

In 2021, Sa Re Ga Ma Pa Li’l Champs Nepal was organized.

== Series history ==
The first season was first aired on 8 July 2006. It was hosted by playback singer Shaan and judged by Abhijeet Bhattacharya, Alka Yagnik and Bappi Lahiri. Sanchita Bhattacharya became the winner of the first season.

#	Season	Year	Winner	Host	Judges
1	Sa Re Ga Ma Pa Li'l Champs	2006	Sanchita Bhattacharya	Shaan	Abhijeet Bhattacharya, Alka Yagnik, Bappi Lahiri
2	Sa Re Ga Ma Pa Li'l Champs International	2007	Anamika Choudhari	Aditya Narayan	Suresh Wadkar, Sonu Nigam
3	Sa Re Ga Ma Pa Li'l Champs 2009	2009	Hemant Brijwasi	Dhairya Sorecha, Afsha Musani	Abhijeet Bhattacharya, Alka Yagnik
4	Sa Re Ga Ma Pa Li'l Champs 2011	2011	Azmat Hussain	Jay Soni	Adnan Sami, Kailash Kher, Javed Ali
5	Sa Re Ga Ma Pa Li'l Champs 2014	2014	Gagan Gopalkrishna Gaonkar	Aditya Narayan	Alka Yagnik, Shaan, Monali Thakur
6	Sa Re Ga Ma Pa Li'l Champs 2017	2017	Anjali Gaikwad and Shreyan Bhattacharya	Aditya Narayan	Himesh Reshammiya, Javed Ali, Neha Kakkar
7	Sa Re Ga Ma Pa Li'l Champs 2019	2019	Sugandha Date	Ravi Dubey	Shaan, Richa Sharma, Amaal Malik
8	Sa Re Ga Ma Pa Li'l Champs 2020	2020	Aryananda R Babu	Manish Paul	Alka Yagnik, Himesh Reshammiya, Javed Ali
9	Sa Re Ga Ma Pa Li'l Champs 2022	2022	Jetshen Dohna Lama	Bharti Singh	Anu Malik, Neeti Mohan, Shankar Mahadevan

== See also ==
- Sa Re Ga Ma Pa Marathi Li'l Champs
- Sa Re Ga Ma Pa Tamil Li'l Champs
