= Aditya Narayan =

Indian actor, host and singer

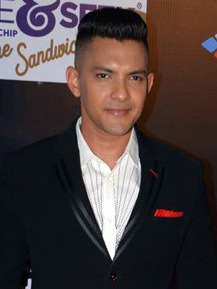
- Narayan, c. 2018
- Born: Aditya Narayan Jha; 6 August 1987 (age 39)
- Education: SIES College of Arts, Science, and Commerce
- Occupations: Singer; television presenter; actor
- Years active: 1992–present
- Known for: Indian Idol; Fear Factor: Khatron Ke Khiladi 9
- Spouse: Shweta Agarwal (m. 2020)
- Children: 1
- Father: Udit Narayan
- Musical career
- Genre: Filmi

Aditya Narayan Jha (born 6 August 1987) is an Indian singer, host and actor. He is the son of singer Udit Narayan. He is known for hosting Indian Idol and participating in Fear Factor: Khatron Ke Khiladi 9.

== Personal life ==
Narayan was born to singer Udit Narayan Jha and Deepa Narayan Jha. In November 2020, he announced his marriage with Shweta Agarwal to be held in December the same year. They married on 1 December 2020, in a close-knit ceremony in Mumbai attended by a small number of people. They had a child, a girl, in March 2022.

== Career ==
Narayan's first playback song was for the Nepalese film Mohini in 1992 and then a Hindi film Rangeela with Asha Bhosle. Later in 1995 he performed a song for Akele Hum Akele Tum along with his father, Udit Narayan.

His acting career as a child began when Narayan was spotted by producer and director Subhash Ghai at the 1995 Filmfare Award function, as the final performer for the "Little Wonders" troupe. Ghai then signed him for his forthcoming film Pardes, starring Shah Rukh Khan and Mahima Chaudhary. His second film was Jab Pyaar Kisise Hota Hai starring Salman Khan and Twinkle Khanna. Narayan's role as Kabir Dhanrajgir earned him a Best Supporting Actor nomination at the 1999 Zee Cine Awards.

As a child artist, Narayan performed more than 100 songs and also released the album Aditya at Polygram Music (now Universal Music). His most successful song was "Chhota Baccha Jaan Ke" from the film Masoom in 1996. It also earned him his first major film award, the Screen Awards critics' Best Child Singer in 1997. Narayan also received a special jury award at the Screen Awards as best child singer for the same song.

In 2006 he completed a diploma in English contemporary music at Tech Music Schools, in London. On his return to India, he was called to audition for Sa Re Ga Ma Pa Challenge 2007, and he became the anchor for that show. In April/May 2008 he toured North America and the West Indies, giving concerts together with his father, Udit Narayan.

In 2009 Narayan signed his first film as lead actor, Shaapit, directed by Vikram Bhatt, which was released worldwide on 19 March 2010. He sang four songs and also wrote and composed the title track for the film, Shaapit Hua.

Meanwhile, he continued working as a TV host, hosting Sa Re Ga Ma Pa Challenge 2009. In 2011, he hosted the reality show X Factor on Sony Entertainment Television.

In early 2012, Narayan joined Sanjay Leela Bhansali as an assistant director for the producer/director's next directorial venture, Goliyon Ki Raasleela Ram-Leela. He also performed two songs for the film, "Tattad Tattad", which was originally supposed to be rendered by his father Udit Narayan, and "Ishqaun Dhishqyaun".

In 2014 he released his first independent single "Tu Hi Pyar Hai" with Gabriella Demetriades. He created a band called The A Team in June 2014.

In 2015, Narayan hosted yet another successful season of Sa Re Ga Ma Pa L'il Champs.

Narayan released his second Hindi single on his birthday, 6 August titled "Tera Ishq Jee Paaun", starring Yoshika Verma, composed by Arijit Chakraborty and written by Manoj Yadav under the music label T-Series.

Narayan's first commercially successful single was released in December. Titled "Zindagi", the video starred Evgeniia Belousova and had music composed by Harshit Chauhan and written by Prashant Ingole under the music label T-Series.

In 2016, Narayan was back as host for SaReGaMaPa. The grand finale garnered record breaking TRP's and Narayan beat his own record of the most watched Grand Finale back when he was hosting Sa Re Ga Ma Pa Challenge 2009.

In March, Narayan released his fourth single titled "Mohabbat", composed and written by himself under the music label T-Series. It was the first music video not to feature him in it and also the first single to be composed and written by Narayan. Both the song and music video under performed.

In August, Narayan released his fifth single titled "Behka Behka", composed and written by himself under the music label T-Series. It was the first music video in India to be shot entirely in reverse and flipped backwards and also the first music video to feature his band, Aditya Narayan & The A Team.

In December, Narayan released his sixth single titled "Yaara", starring Evgeniia Belousova, composed by Aditya Narayan and written by Prashant Ingole under the music label T-Series.

In 2017, Narayan hosted the sixth season of Sa Re Ga Ma Pa L'il Champs on Zee TV. He also took part in Entertainment Ki Raat on Colors TV.

In 2018, Narayan yet again hosted another successful season of Sa Re Ga Ma Pa on Zee TV.

In 2019, he participated in the ninth season of Colors TV popular stunt-based reality show Khatron Ke Khiladi where he ended as the runner-up losing to Punit Pathak. In March 2019, he started hosting the third season of singing reality show Rising Star. In April and May, he has many episodic appearances in Khatra Khatra Khatra. On 2 October, he released another single named "Lillah" on his YouTube channel. A music video was released on 7 October, featuring himself and Sushrii Shreya Mishraa.

In February 2020, Narayan featured in Tony Kakkar and Neha Kakkar's song "Goa Beach". In April, Narayan sang "Main Dooba Rahoon". In August, Narayan releases another independent single titled "Kyun". In September, Aditya Narayan was featured as the lead character as well as the associate director and producer of the Udit Narayan's solo single titled "Tere Bagair".

== Filmography ==
=== Television ===
Year	Title	Role	Notes
2007	Sa Re Ga Ma Pa Challenge	Host	
2008	Sa Re Ga Ma Pa L'il Champs	Host	
2009	Sa Re Ga Ma Pa Challenge	Host	
2011	X Factor India	Host	
2015	Sa Re Ga Ma Pa L'il Champs	Host	
2016	Sa Re Ga Ma Pa	Host	
2017	Sa Re Ga Ma Pa L'il Champs	Host	
2018	Entertainment Ki Raat	Host	
2018	Sa Re Ga Ma Pa	Host	
2019	Fear Factor: Khatron Ke Khiladi 9	Contestant	1st Runner Up
2019	Khatra Khatra Khatra	Guest	Recurring
2019	Rising Star 3	Host	
2019	Kitchen Champion	Host	
2019	Indian Idol 11	Host	
2020–2021	Indian Idol 12	Host	
2021	Sa Re Ga Ma Pa :Sapnon Ki Shuruwaat	Host	
2021	Zee Comedy Show	Comedian	
2022	Superstar Singer 2	Host	
2023	Sa Re Ga Ma Pa 2023	Host	
2024	Pandya Store	Himself	Special appearance
2024–2025	Indian Idol 15	Host	
2025	Rise and Fall	Contestant	9th place

=== Films ===
Year	Title	Role	Note(s)
1995	Rangeela	Himself	Child actor
1997	Pardes	Potla	Child actor
1998	Jab Pyaar Kisise Hota Hai	Kabir Dhanrajgir	Child actor
2010	Shaapit	Aman Bhargav	Debut film
2018	22 days	Himself	Special appearance in the song "Black Magic"

=== Music videos ===
Year	Title	Singer(s)
2020	"Tere Bagair"	Udit Narayan
2020	"Goa Beach"	Tony Kakkar and Neha Kakkar

== Discography ==
=== As a playback singer ===
Year	Film	Song(s)	Music Director	Notes
1992	Mohani	"Yo Gaun Ko Thito Ma"	Sambhujeet Baskota	Nepalese Film
1995	Rangeela	"Rangeela Re"	A. R. Rahman	
1995	Akele Hum Akele Tum	"Akele Hum Akele Tum"	Anu Malik	
1996	Diljale	"Mera Mulk, Mera Desh"	Anu Malik	
1996	Shastra	"Ladki Deewani Ladka Deewana"	Aadesh Shrivastava	
1996	Masoom	"Chota Bachcha Jaan Ke"	Anand Raaj Anand	
1997	Bhai	"Katti Batti" "Khul Gaya Naseeb"	Anand Milind	
1997	Ghoonghat	"Chim Chimni" "Hotel Mobile"	Anand Raaj Anand	
1997	Pardes	"I Love My India"	Nadeem-Shravan	
1998	Pardesi Babu	"Hai Nazuk Nazuk Halki"	Anand Raj Anand	
1998	Chachi 420	"Chupdi Chachi"	Vishal Bhardwaj	
1998	Aakrosh: Cyclone of Anger	"Picnic Mein Ho Gaya"	Anand Raaj Anand	
1998	2001: Do Hazaar Ek	"Rappa Rappa Rum Pum"	Anand Raaj Anand	
1999	Taal	"Kahin Aag Lage"	A. R. Rahman	
1999	Biwi No.1	"Mujhe Maaf Karna"	Anu Malik	
2000	Papa The Great	"Papa The Great"	Nikhil-Vinay	
2000	Raja Ko Rani Se Pyar Ho Gaya	"Sun Lo Re Bandhu"	Jatin–Lalit	
2001	Aaghat	"Tumi Amar Ke"		Bengali Film
2001	Aashirbad	"Pani Ghatta"		Nepali Film
2009	Chal Chalein	"Chal Chal Chal Ke" "Batladein Koi"	Ilaiyaraaja	
2010	Shaapit	"Kabhi Na Kabhi To Miloge - Rock" "Chaahata Dil Tumko" "Kabhi Na Kabhi To Miloge" "Shaapit Hua Kya Kya Hota Hai"	Chirantan Bhatt	
2013	Goliyon Ki Raasleela Ram-Leela	"Ishqyaun Dhishqyaun" "Tattad Tattad"	Sanjay Leela Bhansali	
2015	Carry On Maratha	"Carry on Maratha title track "	Shail Hada, Pritesh Mehta	Marathi film
2020	Dil Bechara	"Mera Naam Kizzie"	A.R. Rahman	
2022	Himesh Ke Dil Se	"Duaa Mein Yaad Rakhna"	Himesh Reshammiya	Music Album
2022	Himesh Ke Dil Se	"Teri Dillaggi Mein"	Himesh Reshammiya	Music Album
2022	Shamshera	"Ji Huzoor"	Mithoon	
2023	Gadar 2	"Main Nikla Gaddi"	Mithoon	

=== As a music director ===
Year	Film	Song(s)
2010	Shaapit	"Shaapit Hua Kya Kya Hota Hain"

=== Independent singles ===
Year	Song(s)
2019	Lillah
2020	Kyun
2020	Main Dooba Rahoon

== Controversies ==
In February 2024, he held a concert where he grabbed a concert-goer's phone and threw it away at a distance. The singer refused to comment, however his management team defended him, claiming that the fan was not even a student and was "dragging Aditya's feet". The fan, who was indeed a student, claimed that he was handing out his phone for a selfie, but was hit by the singer with the microphone for no apparent reason and had his phone forcefully taken and thrown away. A viral video from the concert shows Aditya forcefully taking the phone, and striking the hand with microphone on resistance.

== Awards and nominations ==
Year	Award	Category	Work	Result	Notes	Ref.
1997	Screen Awards	Special Jury Award	Masoom	Won	for his song "Chhota Baccha Jaan Ke"	
1999	Zee Cine Awards	Best Actor in a Supporting Role – Male	Jab Pyaar Kisise Hota Hai	Nominated		
2007	Indian Television Academy Awards	Glamour Face Of The Year – Male	Sa Re Ga Ma Pa Challenge 2007	Won		
2011	Ghanta Awards	Worst Breakthrough	Shaapit	Won		
2014	Producers Guild Film Awards	Best Male Playback Singer	"Tattad Tattad" & "Ishqyaun Dhishqyuan" from Goliyon Ki Raasleela Ram-Leela	Nominated		
