= List of awards and nominations received by Udit Narayan =

Indian playback singer

Udit Narayan awards and nominations
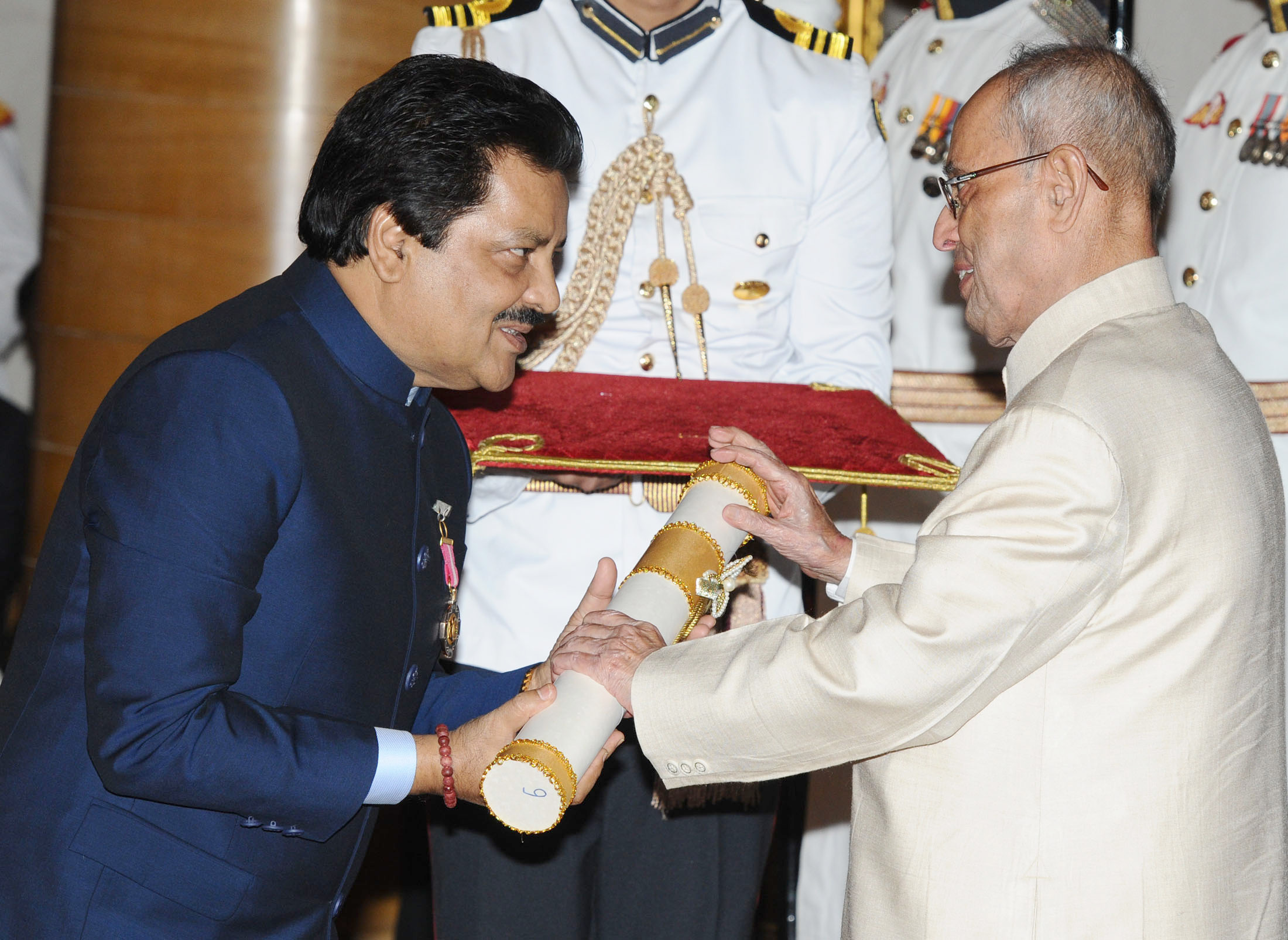
- Narayan receiving Padma Bhushan from former President of India Pranab Mukherjee
Awards and nominations
Award	Wins	Nominations
National Film Awards	4	0
Filmfare Awards	5	20
Filmfare Awards South	0	1
Vijay Awards	0	1
Star Screen Awards	2	8
Zee Cine Awards	1	7
IIFA Awards	1	11
Producers Guild Film Awards	0	2
Bollywood Movie Awards	2	2
Kalakar Awards	5	0
Mirchi Music Awards	2	0
Other awards	5	7
Honours	3	0

Totals (Note: Certain award groups do not simply award one winner. They acknowledge several different recipients, have runners-up, and have third place. Since this is a specific recognition and is different from losing an award, runner-up mentions are considered wins in this award tally. For simplification and to avoid errors, each award in this list has been presumed to have had a prior nomination.)
- Wins: 30
- Nominations: 55

Udit Narayan (born 1955) is an Indian playback singer known for his work in Hindi, Nepali, and other regional language films. He has won four National Film Awards and five Filmfare Awards for Best Male Playback Singer.

In 2001, Narayan was awarded the Prabal Gorkha Dakshin Bahu by the late King of Nepal Birendra Bir Bikram Shah Dev.

He received the Padma Shri in 2009 and the Padma Bhushan in 2016 from the Government of India for his outstanding contributions to music.

== Awards and nominations ==
Year	Category	Song/Nomination	Result
National Film Awards
2001	Best Male Playback Singer	Mitwa – Lagaan	Won
2001	Best Male Playback Singer	Jaane Kyon Log – Dil Chahta Hai	Won
2002	Best Male Playback Singer	Chote Chote Sapne Ho – Zindagi Khoobsoorat Hai	Won
2004	Best Male Playback Singer	Yeh Taara Woh Taara – Swades	Won
2005	Best Feature Film in Bhojpuri	Kab Hoi Gawna Hamar (Producer)	Won
Filmfare Awards
1989	Best Male Playback Singer	Papa Kahte Hai – Qayamat Se Qayamat Tak	Won
1993	Best Male Playback Singer	Pehla Nasha - Jo Jeeta Wohi Sikandar	Nominated
1994	Best Male Playback Singer	Phoolon Sa Chehra Tera - Anari	Nominated
1994	Best Male Playback Singer	Jaadu Teri Nazar – Darr	Nominated
1995	Best Male Playback Singer	Tu Cheez Badi Hai – Mohra	Nominated
1996	Best Male Playback Singer	Mehandi Lagake Rakhna – Dilwale Dulhaniya Le Jayenge	Won
1996	Best Male Playback Singer	Raja Ko Rani Se - Akele Hum Akele Tum	Nominated
1997	Best Male Playback Singer	Pardesi Pardesi – Raja Hindustani	Won
1997	Best Male Playback Singer	Ghar Se Nikalte Hi – Papa Kahte Hai	Nominated
1997	Best Male Playback Singer	Ho Nahin Sakta - Diljale	Nominated
1998	Best Male Playback Singer	Dil To Pagal Hai - Dil To Pagal Hai	Nominated
1999	Best Male Playback Singer	Kuch Kuch Hota Hai – Kuch Kuch Hota Hai	Nominated
2000	Best Male Playback Singer	Chand Chupa Badal Mein – Hum Dil De Chuke Sanam	Won
2001	Best Male Playback Singer	Dil Ne Ye Kaha Hai – Dhadkan	Nominated
2002	Best Male Playback Singer	Mitwa – Lagaan	Won
2002	Best Male Playback Singer	Udja Kale Kanwa – Gadar: Ek Prem Katha	Nominated
2004	Best Male Playback Singer	Tere Naam – Tere Naam	Nominated
2004	Best Male Playback Singer	Idhar Chala Main Udhar Chala – Koi Mil Gaya	Nominated
2005	Best Male Playback Singer	Main Yahaan Hoon – Veer Zaara	Nominated
2005	Best Male Playback Singer	Yeh Taara Woh Taara – Swades (shared with Master Vignesh)	Nominated
Filmfare Awards South
2011	Best Male Playback Singer – Tamil	Vaama Duraiyamma – Madrasapattinam	Nominated
Vijay Awards
2008	Best Male Playback Singer	Sahana – Sivaji	Nominated
Star Screen Awards
1997	Best Male Playback	Aaye Ho Meri Zindagi Me – Raja Hindustani	Won
2001	Best Male Playback	Dil Ne Ye Kaha Hai – Dhadkan	Nominated
2001	Best Male Playback	Aaja Mahiya – Fiza	Nominated
2001	Best Male Playback	Kaho Na Pyar Hai - Kaho Na Pyar Hai	Nominated
2002	Best Male Playback	Mitwa – Lagaan	Nominated
2002	Best Male Playback	Udja Kale Kanwa – Gadar: Ek Prem Katha	Nominated
2003	Best Male Playback	Woh Chand Jaisi Ladki – Devdas	Won
2004	Best Male Playback	Tere Naam – Tere Naam	Nominated
2005	Best Male Playback	Main Yahan Hoon Yahan – Veer Zaara	Nominated
2006	Best Male Playback	Hum Hai Is Pal Yaha – Kisna: The Warrior Poet	Nominated
Zee Cine Awards
1998	Best Playback Singer – Male	Bholi Si Soorat – Dil To Pagal Hai	Nominated
1999	Best Playback Singer – Male	Tum Paas Aaye – Kuch Kuch Hota Hai	Nominated
2000	Best Playback Singer – Male	Chand Chupa Badal Mein – Hum Dil De Chuke Sanam	Won
2000	Best Playback Singer – Male	Taal Se Taal Mila – Taal	Nominated
2001	Best Playback Singer – Male	Humko Humise Chura Lo – Mohabbatein	Nominated
2001	Best Playback Singer – Male	Dil Ne Ye Kaha Hai – Dhadkan	Nominated
2002	Best Playback Singer – Male	Mitwa – Lagaan	Nominated
2004	Best Playback Singer – Male	Tere Naam – Tere Naam	Nominated
IIFA Awards
2000	Best Male Playback	Chand Chupa Badal Mein – Hum Dil De Chuke Sanam	Won
2001	Best Male Playback	Aaja Mahiya – Fiza	Nominated
2001	Best Male Playback	Kaho Na Pyar Hai - Kaho Na Pyar Hai	Nominated
2002	Best Male Playback	Mitwa – Lagaan	Nominated
2002	Best Male Playback	Udja Kale Kanwa – Gadar: Ek Prem Katha	Nominated
2002	Best Male Playback	Bole Chudiyan – Kabhi Khushi Kabhi Gham	Nominated
2003	Best Male Playback	Woh Chand Jaisi Ladki – Devdas	Nominated
2004	Best Male Playback	Tere Naam – Tere Naam	Nominated
2004	Best Male Playback	Koi Mil Gaya – Koi Mil Gaya	Nominated
2005	Best Male Playback	Aankhe Band Karke – Aitraaz	Nominated
2005	Best Male Playback	Lal Dupatta – Mujhse Shaadi Karogi	Nominated
2005	Best Male Playback	Yeh Taara Woh Taara – Swades	Nominated
Apsara Film & Television Producers Guild Awards
2004	Best Male Playback Singer	Idhar Chala Main Udhar Chala – Koi Mil Gaya	Nominated
2006	Best Male Playback Singer	Main Yahaan Hoon – Veer Zaara	Nominated
Bollywood Movie Awards
1999	Best Playback Singer Male	Kuch Kuch Hota Hai – Kuch Kuch Hota Hai	Won
2000	Best Playback Singer Male	Chand Chupa Badal Mein – Hum Dil De Chuke Sanam	Won
Kalakar Awards
2001	Best Playback Singer (Male)	Har Dil Jo Pyaar Karega – Har Dil Jo Pyaar Karega	Won
2006	Best Playback Singer (Male)	Ek Dilruba Hai – Bewafaa	Won
2011	Best Playback Singer (Male)	Tum Darshan Hum Naina – Isi Life Mein	Won
2013	Best Playback Singer (Male)	Jugnu Banke Tu – Joker	Won
2015	Best Playback Singer (Male)	Teri Mahima Aprampaar - Entertainment	Won
MTV Video Music Award – International Viewer's Choice
1998	MTV Video Music Award (Hindi Film)	Dil To Pagal Hai (with Lata Mangeshkar)	Won
1999	MTV Video Music Award (Hindi Film)	Kuch Kuch Hota Hai (with Alka Yagnik)	Nominated
1999	MTV Video Music Award (Hindi Film)	Mera Mann - Mann (with Alka Yagnik)	Nominated
2000	MTV Video Music Award (Hindi Film)	Kaho Naa... Pyaar Hai (with Alka Yagnik)	Won
2001	MTV Video Music Award (Hindi Film)	Aaja Mahiya – Fiza (with Alka Yagnik)	Nominated
2001	MTV Video Music Award (Hindi Film)	Mitwa – Lagaan (with Alka Yagnik, Sukhwinder Singh & Srinivas)	Nominated
2001	MTV Video Music Award (Hindi Film)	Dil Ne Ye Kaha Hai – Dhadkan (with Alka Yagnik & Kumar Sanu)	Nominated
RED FM Tulu Film Awards
2014	Red FM Tulu Film Award	Oriyardori Asal Tulu Language Film	Won
Bhojpuri Film Award
2006	Best Male Playback Singer	Kanhaiya	Won
2009	Best Male Playback Singer	Umaria Kaili Tohre Naam - Phool ban ke chaman men	Won
Mirchi Music Award
2013	Best Song	Radha – Student of the Year (Shared with Shreya Ghoshal, Vishal–Shekhar & Anvita Dutt Guptan)	Won
2015	Best Album Of All Time	Dilwale Dulhania Le Jayenge (Shared with Kumar Sanu, Abhijeet & Jatin–Lalit)	Won

== Civil honours ==
- Order of Gorkha Dakshin Bahu, Fourth Class (Nepal, 2001) — awarded by the King of Nepal.
- Padma Shri (India, 26 January 2009) — awarded by the Government of India.
- Padma Bhushan (India, 25 January 2016) — third-highest civilian honour.
- Dr. Babasaheb Ambedkar National Contribution Award (12 January 2023) — presented by the Governor of Maharashtra.
- International Buddha Peace Award & Dr. B.R. Ambedkar Award (2023) — awarded by the Maitry Peace Foundation.
