= Shaan (singer) =

Indian singer (born 1972)

- Shaan in 2013
- Born: Shantanu Mukherjee; 30 September 1972 (age 54); Bombay, Maharashtra, India
- Education: Jai Hind College, Mumbai
- Occupations: Playback singer; composer; actor; television presenter
- Years active: 1977–present
- Spouse: Radhika Mukherjee (m. 2000)
- Children: 2
- Father: Manas Mukherjee
- Relatives: Sagarika (sister)
- Awards: See below
- Musical career
- Genres: Filmi, Pop, Rock, Classical
- Labels: Universal Music, Times Music, Sony Music, Zee Music, T-Series, Tips, Saregama, Venus, YRF Music, OSA, Magnasound, EMI Virgin Records

Shantanu Mukherjee (Bengali pronunciation: [ʃantonu mukʰardʒi]; born 30 September 1972), professionally known as Shaan, is an Indian playback singer, composer, actor, and television host. He records songs primarily in Hindi, Bengali, Kannada and Telugu language. Known as the "Golden Voice of India", A notable playback singer of India, he is also noted for his songs in the romantic genre, mainly during the 2000s. Shaan is a recipient of two Filmfare Awards and three International Indian Film Academy Awards.

His most popular songs include — "Musu Musu Haasi Deu" from Pyaar Mein Kabhi Kabhi (1999), "Woh Ladki Hai Kahan" and "Koi Kahe Kehta Rahe" from Dil Chahta Hai (2001), "Ghanan Ghanan" from Lagaan (2001), "Mere Samnewali Khidki Mein" from Dil Vil Pyar Vyar (2002), "O Humdum Suniyo Re" from Saathiya (2002), "Jaadu Hai Nasha Hai" from Jism (2003), "Kuch To Hua Hai" from Kal Ho Naa Ho (2003), "O Jaana" from Tere Naam (2003), "Ladki Kyun" from Hum Tum (2004), "Main Aisa Kyun Hoon" from Lakshya (2004), "Dus Bahane" from Dus (2005), "My Dil Goes Mmmm" from Salaam Namaste (2005), "Main Hoon Don" from Don - The Chase Begins Again (2006), "Chaand Sifarish" from Fanaa (2006), "Rock And Roll Soniye" and "Where's The Party Tonight" from Kabhi Alvida Naa Kehna (2006), "Let's Rock Soniye" from Bhool Bhulaiya (2007), "Aao Milo Chale" from Jab We Met (2007), "You're My Love" from Partner (2007), "Deewangi Deewangi" from Om Shanti Om (2007), "Jab Se Tere Naina" from Saawariya (2007), "Hey Shona" from Ta Ra Rum Pum (2007) and "Behti Hawa Sa Tha Woh" from 3 Idiots (2009).

== Early life and family ==
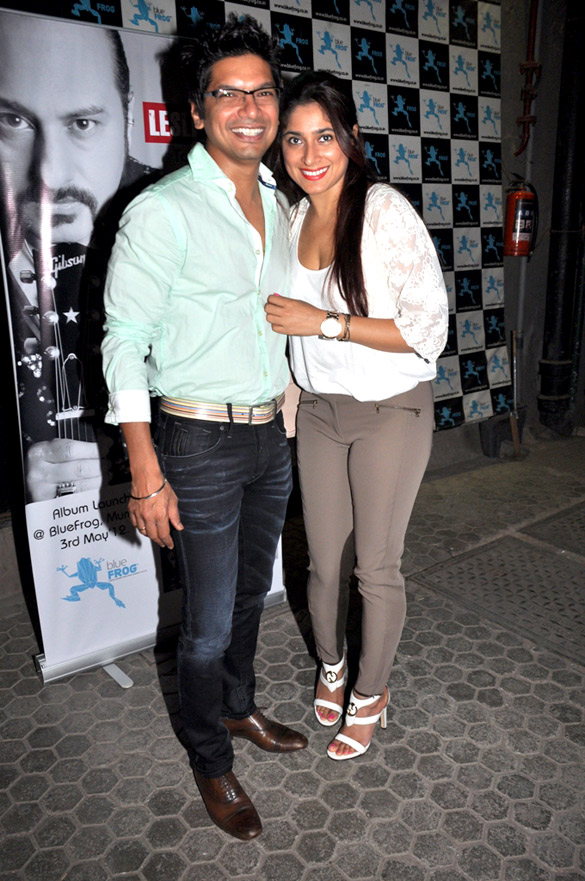
Shaan with his wife Radhika

Shaan was born on 30 September 1972 in Bombay in a Bengali family. His grandfather was Jahar Mukherjee, a well known lyricist, his father Manas Mukherjee, was a music director and his sister Sagarika is a singer as well. He grew up in Mumbai, Maharashtra. Shaan is married to Radhika Mukherjee, with whom he has two sons, Maahi and Soham. Both of his sons have ventured into the music industry.

== Career ==
=== Early years in musical career ===
Shaan began his career singing jingles for advertisements. Along with jingles, began to sing remixes and cover versions. His first recorded song was "A Te Apple Kheye", which was released in 1977.

Shaan released his first album It's Time To Dance in 1987. Later in 1990, he first collaborated with Bally Sagoo to record the track titled "Mele Wich Aaye" and featured in Bally Sagoo's debut album Wham Bam. The following year, they recorded another track titled "Nakhro De Nakhre" that appeared in Sagoo's second album Star Crazy.

Shaan and his sister signed up with Magnasound recording company and recorded a few successful albums, including the hit album Naujawan (1996) followed by Q-Funk. Before that, he recorded his first English song "Heads Over Heels" in the album Stylebhai in 1994 and his first Hindi song "Silsile", featuring Shweta Shetty was recorded in 1995 as a part of the album Shweta - The New Album. Later in 1997, Shaan released Love-Ology after this, which was his first independent solo album. In 2000, he sang a superhit song "Tanha Dil" (transl. Lonely heart) from his second independent solo album Tanha Dil. In the same year, he also sang his first Assamese song "Hatore Aanguli" that appears on the album Mann.

In 2002, he won the MTV Asia Award for Favorite Artist India for best solo album for his album Tanha Dil. One year later, Shaan released his third independent solo album Aksar, which was successful and contained songs featuring international stars such as Blue, Melanie C and Samira Said. For both the albums Tanha Dil and Aksar, all the songs were sung by Shaan, composed by Ram Sampath and written by both Shaan and Ram Sampath.

He released Tomar Aakash in 2004, a Bengali album, along with his sister and featuring his father's unreleased songs. In 2006, he released a song with MLTR, "Take me to your heart". The song appears on his fourth independent solo album Tishnagi, which is produced by Ranjit Barot and engineered by Ashish Manchanda.

=== Career in playback singing ===
Shaan made his playback singing debut in 1999 in the movie Pyaar Mein Kabhi Kabhi where he sung two songs in the film. The song "Musu Musu Hasi" instantly struck a chord among the viewers and was very relatable to the youth.

In 2023, Shan performed at a musical concert in Boston, organised by the Jay-Ho! The concert highlighted how music can bring people together, creating a joyful and entertaining atmosphere. It also demonstrated the strong affection and loyalty that Boston residents have for Shaan and his music.

He recorded a song for the Bengali feature film Network which is composed by Dabbu.

In 2023, Shaan recorded a romantic song composed by Pritam for Shah Rukh Khan in Dunki.

=== Work as host and judge ===
Shaan first appeared the television show Channel V Music Awards as a guest host with his sister in 1996. Later, he mainly hosted the television show Sa Re Ga Ma Pa on Zee TV between the years 2002 to 2006.

Shaan has been a judge on many talent shows. Shaan is a team captain, judge and mentor on STAR Plus's Music Ka Maha Muqqabla for the team Shaan's Strikers. Shaan appeared as a judge in Sa Re Ga Ma Pa Li'l Champs 2014 and The Voice India Kids 2016. In 2015 and 2016, Shaan was the winning coach in each of the first two seasons of The Voice. He appeared as a judge in the second and fourth season of the Bengali reality show Super Singer.

== Filmography ==
=== Films ===
Along with singing, Shaan made his debut as an actor where he acted in the film Daman: A Victim of Marital Violence, also starring Raveena Tandon. His songs have appeared in the films, Zameen and Hungama.

Year	Title	Role	Language
2000	Tarkieb	Special appearance in the song "Dil Mera Tarse"	Hindi
2001	Daman: A Victim of Marital Violence	Kaushik Nath	Hindi
2001	Asoka	Special appearance in the song "O Re Kaanchi"	Hindi
2003	Hungama	Special appearance in the song "Chain Aapko Mila"	Hindi
2003	Zameen	As himself	Hindi
2006	The Bong Connection	Special appearance in the song "Majhi Re"	Bengali
2007	Loins of Punjab Presents	As himself	English
2008	Hari Puttar: A Comedy of Terrors	As Himself	Hindi
2014	Balwinder Singh Famous Ho Gaya	Balwinder Singh	Hindi
2014	Teen Patti	As himself	Bengali
2017	Secret Superstar	Cameo	Hindi
2018	Helicopter Eela	Cameo	Hindi
2023	Music School	Albert	Hindi, Telugu, Tamil

=== Television ===
Year	Title	Language	Role	Notes
1996	Tarang	Hindi	Special Guest	His first on-screen television appearances
1996	Channel V Music Awards	English, Mandarin Chinese, Hindi	Guest host	His second on-screen television appearances
1997	MTV 1 2 3	Hindi	Special Guest	His third on-screen television appearance occurred during a mini-interview with then MTV VJ Raageshwari.
2002–2005	Sa Re Ga Ma Pa	Hindi	Host	
2005–2006	Sa Re Ga Ma Pa Challenge 2005	Hindi	Host	
2006	Sa Re Ga Ma Pa Ek Main Aur Ek Tu	Hindi	Host	
2006	Sa Re Ga Ma Pa L'il Champs	Hindi	Host	
2007	Amul STAR Voice of India	Hindi	Host	
2008	STAR Voice of India 2	Hindi	Host	
2009	1st Mirchi Music Awards	Hindi	Host	
2009–2010	Music Ka Maha Muqqabla	Hindi	Superstar captain of Shaan's Strikers	
2010	Ishaan: Sapno Ko Awaaz De	Hindi	Himself	
2011	3rd Mirchi Music Awards	Hindi	Host	
2012	4th Mirchi Music Awards	Hindi	Host	
2013	Jhalak Dikhhla Jaa – Season 6	Hindi	Contestant	
2014	F.I.R.	Hindi	Himself	
2014–2015	Sa Re Ga Ma Pa Li'l Champs 2014–2015	Hindi	Judge	
2015–2017	The Voice India	Hindi	Coach/Judge	
2016	The Voice India Kids	Hindi	Coach	
2017	The Voice India Kids	Hindi	Judge/Coach	
2018	ARRived (A R Rahman Youtube Show)	Hindi	Judge	
2019	Sa Re Ga Ma Pa Li'l Champs 2019	Hindi	Judge	
2020	Super Singer	Bengali	Judge	
2021	Indian Pro Music League	Hindi	Captain of Bengal Tigers	
2022	Swayamvar – Mika Di Vohti	Hindi	Host	
2023	Super Singer	Bengali	Judge	
2024	Ghum Hai Kisikey Pyaar Mein	Hindi	Guest in Rajat and Savi's wedding	
2025	India's Got Talent	Hindi	Judge	
2026	Indian Idol	Hindi	Special Judge Appearance	
2026	Brown	Hindi	Nitin Goswami	Special appearance Mini-web series
2026	Prag Cine Awards 2026	Hindi, Assamese	Performer	

== Popularity and public image ==
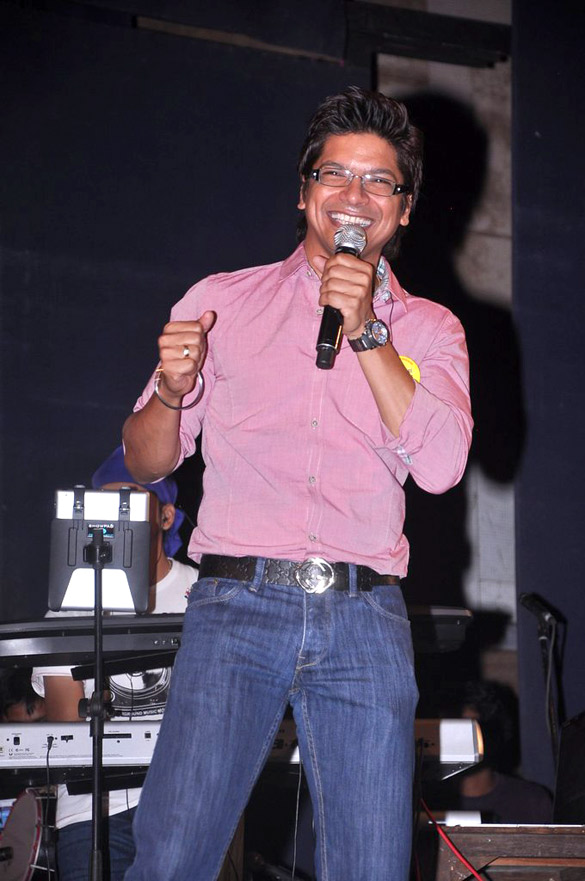
Shaan at an event in 2012

Shaan is described in the media as one of the most popular singers of Indian cinema. Shaan is also among the highest-paid singers in India. India TV placed him in its "Top 10 Bollywood Singers" of all time list. A total of six songs of his were placed in BBC's "Top 40 Bollywood Soundtracks of all time" list. Shaan is a member of the Board of Advisors of I.I.M.U.N., since 2021.

== Awards and nominations ==
Shaan's song "Chand Sifarish" (from the movie Fanaa) and "Jab Se Tere Naina" (from Saawariya) won the Filmfare Best Male Playback Award and the Zee Cine Award Best Playback Singer - Male, in addition to receiving several other nominations. Before this, in 1996, he nominated the MTV Video Music Awards for the best international viewer choice in his song "Roop Tera Mastana". In the same year, he also nominated Channel V Music Awards for the best Indian pop music video in his song "Aisa Hota Hai". In 2002, he won the MTV Asia Music Award for best solo album for his album Tanha Dil. In 2026, Lokmat Sur Jyotsna National Music Award was honoured Icon Award for his versatile and contribution to the Indian music Industry Following are the list of awards and nominations in different categories.

Year	Category	Song	Result
Channel V Music Awards
1996	Best Indian Pop Music Video	"Aisa Hota Hai" from Naujawan	Nominated
1997	Best Debut Indian Pop Album	"Love-Ology"	Nominated
MTV Video Music Awards
1996	Best International Viewers Choice Award	"Roop Tera Mastana" from Roop Inka Mastana	Nominated
MTV Asia Music Awards
2002	Best Solo Album	"Tanha Dil"	Won
Zee Cine Award
2004	Best Playback Singer – Male	"Suno Na" from Jhankaar Beats	Won
2007	Best Playback Singer – Male	"Chand Sifarish" from Fanaa	Won
2008	Best Playback Singer – Male	"Jab Se Tere Naina" from Saawariya	Won
Bollywood Movie Awards
2007	Best Male Playback	"Chand Sifarish" from Fanaa	Won
Star Screen Awards
2007	Best Male Playback	"Chand Sifarish" from Fanaa	Won
Filmfare
2002	Best Playback Singer – Male	"Koi Kahein Kehta Raahein" from Dil Chahta Hai	Nominated
2003	Best Male Playback Award	"Nikamma" from Kya Dil Ne Kahan	Nominated
2006	Best Male Playback Award	"Dus Bahane" from Dus	Nominated
2007	Best Male Playback Award	"Chand Sifarish" from Fanaa	Won
2008	Best Male Playback Award	"Jab Se Tere Naina" from Saawariya	Won
Filmfare – South
2014	Kannada cinema: Best Playback Singer – Male	"Kannalle Kannittu" from Shravani Subramanya	Nominated
IIFA
2007	Best Male Playback Award	"Chand Sifarish" from Fanaa	Won
2008	Best Male Playback Award	"Jab Se Tere Naina" from Saawariya	Won
2010	Best Male Playback Award	"Behti Hawa Sa Tha Woh" from 3 Idiots	Won
GIMA
2010	Best Male Playback Singer Award	"Behti Hawa Sa Tha Woh" from 3 Idiots	Won
Annual Central European Bollywood Awards
2008	Best Song Award	"Dastaan-E-Om Shanti Om" from Om Shanti Om	Won
Indian Television Academy Awards
2018	Best Title Music Song Award	"Tu Kahe Toh" from Haasil	Won
Producers Guild Film Awards
2006	Best Male Playback Singer Award	"Main Aisa Kyon Hoon" from Lakshya	Nominated
2008	Best Male Playback Singer Award	"Jab Se Tere Naina" from Saawariya	Won
2015	Best Male Playback Singer Award	"Chaar Kadam" from PK	Nominated
Sur Jyotsna National Music Awards
2026	Best Icon Award	—N/a	Won

== See also ==
- List of Indian playback singers
