= X Factor India =

- Created by: Simon Cowell
- Written by: Kausar Munir
- Directed by: Mukesh Parmar
- Creative directors: Monisha Jaising Vaid; Utkarshini Vashishtha
- Presented by: Aditya Narayan
- Judges: Sonu Nigam; Shreya Ghoshal; Sanjay Leela Bhansali
- Original language: Hindi
- No. of seasons: 1

Production
- Executive producer: Anupama Mandloi
- Producers: Sheldon Bailley; Fotini Paraskakis; NBR Patra
- Cinematography: Surindra Rao

Original release
- Network: Sony Entertainment Television
- Release: 29 May – 2 September 2011

X Factor India is the Indian version of The X Factor. It is a television music talent show contested by aspiring singers of all genres drawn from public auditions from all across India. The show in its inaugural year was broadcast on Sony Entertainment Television Channel. The 2011 competition was open to all Indian citizens born before 15 January 1995. There were 3 categories for registrants: Solo performances for those between 16 and 24 years of age as of 15 January 2011 and for those equal to and above 25 years of age as of 15 January 2011 and Group performance for a group of 2 or more people, all of which should be above the age of 16 years as of 15 January 2011. Reservation draws were to be divided one third to each category. Each week, live concerts were held in Mumbai where the 12 finalists performed for the judges and a live studio audience

== Auditions ==
Registrations were launched via telephones and SMS on 20 January 2011 all across India. Auditions were held in the following cities:

- Ahmedabad 12 February 2011
- Kolkata 15 and 16 February 2011
- Lucknow 23 February 2011
- Indore 27 February 2011
- Mumbai 4 and 5 March 2011
- Delhi 12 and 13 March 2011

== Judges and host ==
The first season of the Indian version of X Factor was judged by singer Sonu Nigam, playback singer Shreya Ghoshal and film director Sanjay Leela Bhansali. The show was hosted by Aditya Narayan.

Key:

– Winning judge/category. Winners are in bold, eliminated contestants in small font.

Season	Sonu Nigam	Shreya Ghoshal	Sanjay Leela Bhansali
**One**	**16-24's** Seema Jha; Sahiti G Piyush Kapoor; Shovan Ganguly	**Over 25's** **Geet Sagar**; Kartar Singh Yadav; Amit Jadhav; Manjeera Ganguly	**Groups**; Sajda Sisters; Nirmitee; Deewana; Last Minute

Geet Sagar from Gwalior was announced winner of the show. As a prize he won Rs. 50 lakh, a car & an opportunity to sing in Karan Johar's movie. He recorded the title track "Draamebaaz" for the film Nautanki Saala! (2013). He has also been singing for TV commercials & jingles like Cinthol, GoIbibo.com, Parachute Tender Hair & Care, Garnier, Marvel Tea, among others.
