= Mulazim Hussain =

- Born: Mulazim Hussain
- Origin: Rawalpindi, Pakistan
- Genres: Ghazal, Pop, Pakistani classical music
- Occupation: Musician
- Instruments: Vocals, keyboard
- Years active: 2012–present
- Label: Coke Studio (Pakistan)
- Website: mulazimhussain.com

Mulazim Hussain (Urdu: ملازم حسین) is a Pakistani singer, songwriter and music producer from Rawalpindi.

== Life and career ==
Hussain was born in Rawalpindi, Pakistan. He was seen in the Pakistani and Indian reality show Sur Kshetra on Geo TV in which he was selected for the finalist with other Pakistani contestant Nabeel Shaukat Ali.

== Television ==
Year	Show	Note
2012	Sur Kshetra	Contestant
2015	Coke Studio	Singer

== Discography ==
Year	Song	Note
2018	Rangeya	Load Wedding
2018	Taqdeer	Taqdeer (title song)
2020	Wafa Kar Chalay	Wafa Kar Chalay (title song)
