= Jab Se Tere Naina =

Song performed by Shaan

- Jab Se Tere Naina song cover featuring actors Ranbir Kapoor and Sonam Kapoor

Song by Shaan

from the album Saawariya
- Language: Hindi
- Released: 2007
- Recorded: 2006
- Length: 4:44
- Label: Sony BMG
- Composer(s): Monty Sharma
- Lyricist(s): Sameer Anjaan

Music video
- "Jab Se Tere Naina" on YouTube

"Jab Se Tere Naina" (transl. Since your eyes) is a song from the 2007 Hindi film Saawariya, performed by Shaan. It was written by Sameer Anjaan and composed by Monty Sharma. The music video features the actor Ranbir Kapoor. The song received a positive reception from critics and won awards at the International Indian Film Academy Awards, India's Filmfare Awards and that country's Producers Guild Film Awards.

== Composition and music video ==
"Jab Se Tere Naina" is four minutes and 44 seconds long. Sung by Shaan, the lyrics for the song were written by Sameer Anjaan and the music was composed by Monty Sharma.

The song is picturized upon Ranbir Kapoor, the lead actor of the film Saawariya. The music video shows Ranbir Raj Malhotra (Ranbir Kapoor) dancing with a towel wrapped around his waist and singing about how his eyes met Sakina's (Sonam Kapoor). In one shot, Ranbir was asked to drop his towel down while singing for the full display of his backside. However, the towel-dropping scene was deleted from the song by the Central Board of Film Certification. When Ranbir was interviewed by the film critic Anupama Chopra, he revealed that for the song, he gave more than 100 takes.

== Reception ==
Joginder Tuteja of Bollywood Hungama said that the song is a "love song that has a serene feel to it". Sukanya Verma of Rediff.com termed the song "a rousing and resplendent celebration of the universal slogan 'crazy little thing called love'."

"Jab Se Tere Naina" won at the 53rd ceremony of India's Filmfare Awards—Best Male Playback Singer award for Shaan. The song also won at the 9th ceremony of India's IIFA Awards—Best Male Playback Singer award for Shaan. At the 5th ceremony of India's Producers Guild Film Awards, the song won the Best Male Playback Singer award for Shaan.
