= Sur Kshetra =

Television series

- Written by: Manoj Muntashar
- Directed by: Gajendra Singh
- Presented by: Ayesha Takia
- Judges: Abida Parveen; Asha Bhosle; Runa Laila
- Opening theme: Jeet Sangeet Ki
- Countries of origin: India; Pakistan
- Original languages: Hindi; Urdu
- No. of episodes: 32

Production
- Production locations: Dubai, Emirate of Dubai
- Cinematography: Gyan Sahaey
- Running time: 65–69 minutes per episode

Original release
- Network: Aag TV (Pakistan); Colors TV (India); Geo TV (Pakistan); Sahara One (India)
- Release: 8 September – 29 December 2012

Sur Kshetra
- Winner: Nabeel Shaukat Ali
- Runner-up: Diljaan

Sur Kshetra is a 2012 singing talent show or musical battle between two teams from the neighboring Pakistan and India. The show was hosted by Indian actress Ayesha Takia. The Pakistani Team was led by singer, music director, music composer, and actor Atif Aslam and the Indian Team was led by music director Himesh Reshammiya.

It has been shown on Colors TV and Sahara One in India, and Geo TV and Aag TV in Pakistan. The show was produced by Saaibaba Telefilms and directed by Gajendra Singh.

The show concluded with a finalist face-off between the two teams, in which Nabeel Shaukat Ali from Pakistan won the title. The show was shot in Dubai.

== Format ==
The contestants are judged by the jury members based on their performance and are awarded marks which is either a zero or a ten. Meaning that if the jury likes the performance they will give a 10 otherwise a 0. The marks of individual contestants are then added team wise and the team with the higher score wins and the captain of the winning team gets to choose a participant to compete for the finalist chairs in a face-off. After four episodes the face-off, the winner of the face-off gets a finalist chair which means straight entry to the finals, while the losing captain has to eliminate one of its contestants.

There were 5 finalist chairs at the start of the show. Sara Raza Khan was the first contestant to sit on a finalist chair based on the decision of the jury. Mulazzim Hussain became the second finalist after winning the face off. Yashraj Kapil sat on the third finalist chair as the captain Himesh Reshammiya left it up to the judges to decide the third finalist from his team. Budhaditya Mukherjee became the fourth finalist after winning the face off for the fourth chair. The battle for the fifth chair proved to be the most exciting as Nabeel Shaukat Ali from Pakistan and Diljaan from team India went head to head in the face off. There was a lot of drama after the face off as both the contestants sang really well and it became very tough for the jury members to decide who should be the fifth finalist Asha Bhosle wanted Diljaan to be the finalist while Abida Parveen wanted Nabeel Shaukat Ali to be the fifth finalist. The neutral judge Runa Laila refused to take the decision and threatened to walk out of the show. After much drama it was finally decided that there would be six finalists instead of five and hence both Diljaan and Nabeel Shaukat Ali made it to the finals. And in the finales Nabeel Shaukat Ali from Pakistan won the title by beating Diljaan in the face-off round.

Shahzad Ali from team India was the first to be eliminated. Indrani Bhattacherjee also from team India was the next to go. Ameer Ali from team Pakistan became the third eliminated contestant and Imran Ali was eliminated next. As Diljaan and Nabeel Shaukat Ali were chosen as the contestants to face off for the fifth finalist chair, Aman Trikha and Nadeem Abbas were eliminated.

Finally there were six finalists on the bench. Three from Pakistan and Three from India. In the Pre-finals it was announced that two finalists with minimum marks would be eliminated and remaining four participants would go through to the Grand Finals. Sara Raza Khan was unable to compete in the last two pre-finals because of her health so she along with Buddhaditya was eliminated as they had the lowest marks.

== Jury members ==
- (Pakistan) Abida Parveen
- (India) Asha Bhonsle
- (Bangladesh) Runa Laila

=== Guest Jury members ===
- (Pakistan) Ghulam Ali
- (Pakistan) Sajjad Ali
- (Pakistan) Hadiqa Kiani
- (India) Ismail Darbar
- (India) Suresh Wadkar
- (India) Alka Yagnik

== Teams ==
=== Team Pakistan ===
Captain: Atif Aslam
Coach: Rustam Fateh Ali Khan

==== Members ====
- (Pakistan) Nabeel Shaukat Ali (Winner)
- (Pakistan) Mulazim Hussain
- (Pakistan) Imran Ali Akhtar
- (Pakistan) Nadeem Abbas
- (Pakistan) Ameer Ali
- (Pakistan) Sara Raza Khan (left the show in pre-finals due to health issues)

=== Team India ===
Captain and Coach: Himesh Reshammiya

==== Members ====
- (India) Diljaan <Runner Up>
- (India) Yashraj Kapil
- (India) Budhaditya Mukherjee
- (India) Shahzad Ali
- (India) Indrani Bhattacharjee
- (India) Aman Trikh
