= Sa Re Ga Ma Pa Li'l Champs 2022 =

Indian reality television program

- Season 2022
- No. of episodes: 30

Release
- Original network: Zee TV
- Original release: 15 October 2022 – 22 January 2023

Season chronology
- ← Previous; 2020

Sa Re Ga Ma Pa L'il Champs 2022 is the ninth season of the Indian child singing reality show Sa Re Ga Ma Pa L'il Champs, which is based on the long-running reality show, Sa Re Ga Ma Pa. It was originally broadcast on Zee TV from October 2022 to January 2023.

== Programming ==
Open auditions were held in five cities, screening 2000 potential contestants. The show premiered on Zee TV and Zee5 simultaneously on 15 October 2022 at 21:00 IST.

== Contestant status ==
Contestants	Position	Status	Date of Elimination
Jetshen Dohna Lama	1st	Winner	22 Jan
Harsh Sikandar	2nd	1st Runner-up	22 Jan
Dnyaneshwari Ghadge	3rd	2nd Runner-up	22 Jan
Atanu Mishra	4th	3rd Runner-up	22 Jan
Atharv Bakshi	5th	4th Runner-up	22 Jan
Rafa Yeasmin	6th	5th Runner-up	22 Jan
Aarohi Soni	7th	Eliminated	14 Jan
Devika Sharma	8th	Eliminated	14 Jan
Palakshi Dixit	9th	Eliminated	1 Jan
Prajyot Gundale	10th	Eliminated	1 Jan
Harmeher Kaur Kalsey	11th	Eliminated	4 Dec
Rajdeep Ghosh	12th	Eliminated	4 Dec
Asham Ali Khan	13th	Eliminated	20 Nov

== Judges and host ==
The show is judged by music composer Anu Malik, playback singer Neeti Mohan and singer and composer Shankar Mahadevan. The show is hosted by Indian comedian Bharti Singh.

== Guests ==
Guest(s)	Ep No.	Date	Remarks
Varun Dhawan and Kriti Sanon	8	6 November 2022	Promotion of film Bhediya
Rahul Deshpande	8	6 November 2022	to support contestant Dnyaneshwari
Mithun Chakraborty and Padmini Kolhapure	9	12 November 2022	Mithun Chakraborty and Padmini Kolhapure Special
Mithun Chakraborty	10	13 November 2022	Mithun and Disco Special. Also, Vijay Benedict and Babbar Subhash made brief appearance as guest
Asha Bhosle	11	19 November 2022	Asha Bhosale special
Pyarelal (of Laxmikant-Pyarelal duo) and wife Sunila	12	20 November 2022	Mohammed Rafi night
Shahid Rafi (Son of Mohammed Rafi)	12	20 November 2022	Mohammed Rafi night
Rajesh Roshan and Rakesh Roshan	13	26 November 2022	The Roshans special
Kajol Devgan and Vishal Jethwa	14	27 November 2022	Kajol Degan 30 Years Special and Salaam Venky promotion
Hema Malini	15	3 December 2022	Dream of Heros Special
Nitin Mukesh	16	4 December 2022	100 Years of Mukesh
Jeetendra and Govinda	17	10 December 2022	The Dancing Heros special
Tusshar Kapoor and Seerat Kapoor	18	11 December 2022	Fathers the Superheroes special, Maarrich promotion
Rohit Shetty, Ranveer Singh, Pooja Hegde and Varun Sharma	19	17 December 2022	Promotion of film Cirkus
Aruna Irani	20	18 December 2022	Late Mehmood and Aruna Irani Special
Karisma Kapoor	21	24 December 2022	Celebrating The Kapoors Family
Chhota Bheem and Little Singham (Indian animated charatacters)	22	25 December 2022	Christmas special
Anandji Virji Shah and Shanta Anandji Shah	23	31 December 2022	Romance Special
Jaya Prada	24	1 January 2023	Celebrating 50 years of Jaya Prada
Kumar Sanu	25	8 January 2023	Dada ki Dadagiri Special
Kumar Sanu	26	9 January 2023	Kumar Sanu special
Asha Parekh	27	14 January 2023	Rajesh Khanna special
Satish Kaushik and Rakul Preet Singh	29	21 January 2023	promotion of film Chhatriwali
Jackie Shroff and Amit Trivedi and Anurag Kashyap	30	22 January 2023	For supporting finalist and promotion of Almost Pyaar with film DJ mohabbat.
