= Music Ka Maha Muqqabla =

- Genre: Game show
- Created by: Gajendra Singh
- Developed by: Gajendra Singh
- Directed by: Gajendra Singh
- Creative director: Rajesh Sonawne
- Presented by: Ayushmann Khurrana
- Starring: Abhas Joshi; Ujjaini Mukherjee; Aneek Dhar; Rehman Ali; Debojit Saha; Anwesha; Harshit Saxena; Shadab Faridi; Raja Hasan; Munawwar Ali; Aishwarya Majmudar; Vinit Singh; Ameya Date; Vedala Hemachandra; Ravi Shukla; Nikita Nigam; Toshi Sabri; Himani Kapoor; Lakhwinder Wadali; Tajinder Singh; Sharib Sabri; Rahul Vaidya; Neeti Mohan; Sanjeev Kumar Jha
- Judges: Shankar Mahadevan; Shreya Ghoshal; Shaan; Himesh Reshammiya; Mohit Chauhan; Mika Singh
- Theme music composer: Anand Sharma; Annujj Kappoo
- Opening theme: "Music Ka Maha Muqqabla" by all six judges
- Ending theme: "Hoga Muqqabla" by all six judges
- Country of origin: India
- Original language: Hindi
- No. of episodes: 18

Production
- Executive producers: Poonam Yadav; Nilakshi Guha; Mahua Banerjee Project head: Dheeraj Raina
- Producer: Nitin Gaikwad
- Production location: Mumbai, India
- Camera setup: Multi-camera
- Running time: 52 minutes
- Production company: Sai Baba Telefilms Pvt. Ltd.

Original release
- Network: Star Plus
- Release: 19 December 2009 – 20 March 2010

Music Ka Maha Muqqabla is a reality show on STAR Plus that first aired on 19 December 2009. It aimed to bring a new format to music reality shows in India, based on teams rather than individuals. The show lasted for a total of 13 weeks.

Six teams, led by their own superstar captains, battled it out in this weekly music competition. The singing superstars included Shaan, Shreya Ghoshal, Mohit Chauhan, Himesh Reshammiya, Mika Singh and Shankar Mahadevan.

Each team consisted of three well-known singers who participated in previous reality TV singing shows and one new singer selected by the captain of the team.

The show was hosted by Ayushmann Khurrana. Each week two captains competed for the highest score in order to win.

The captains that did not compete judged the performances of the singers. There were a total of five rounds in each competition. The audience and the judges gave the score. The show took place in a large outdoor stadium in Mumbai. The stadium consisted of a small section for a few audience members to stand very close to the stage. The rest of the audience sat in the back. Each member of the audience was given a voting machine where they voted when the host asked them to vote. The two competing teams sat on either side of the stage. The captains that did not compete sat in an area in front of the stage. There were background dancers that accompanied the singers when they sang. Two of the captains always sang in the final round and occasionally sang in any other rounds. A "Singer of the Day" Award was given at the end of each episode to a singer selected by the judges. The Grand Finale was won by Shankar Rockstars on 20 March 2010.

== Teams ==
=== Shreya's Superstars ===
- Abhas Joshi
- Ujjaini Mukherjee
- Aneek Dhar
- Rehman Ali

=== Shaan's Strikers ===
- Debojit Saha
- Anwesha
- Harshit Saxena
- Shadab Faridi

=== Himesh's Warriors ===
- Raja Hasan
- Munawwar Ali
- Aishwarya Majmudar
- Vinit Singh

=== Mohit's Fighters ===
- Ameya Date
- Vedala Hemachandra
- Ravi Shukla
- Nikita Nigam

=== Mika's Blasters ===
- Toshi Sabri
- Himani Kapoor
- Lakhwinder Wadali
- Tajinder Singh

=== Shankar's Rockstars(WINNERS) ===
- Sharib Sabri
- Rahul Vaidya
- Neeti Mohan
- Sanjeev Kumar Jha

== Rounds ==
- Round 1: Aamne Saamne-Two singers from opposing teams compete against each other, sing 2 songs each
- Round 2: Hit Pe Hit -Two singers from opposing teams sing HIT songs
- Round 3: DJ – Two singers from opposing teams sing DJ mixed songs
- Round 4: Dil Se – Two singers from opposing teams sing songs that connect "dil" of the audience
- Round 5: Aar Paar -The two opposing teams sing a medley with their captains

== Scoring ==
The scoring was based on the judges' average score and the audience's average score. In Rounds 1 to 5 the scoring was out of 20 points (10 from the judges' average score and 10 from the audience's average score). In the final round (Round 5: Muqqabla Aar Ya Paar), the voting was out of 50 points and only the audience voted.

== Episodes ==
- Episode 1: Shaan's Strikers vs Himesh's Warriors
- Episode 2: Shankar's Rockstars vs Mika's Blasters
- Episode 3: Shreya's Superstars vs Mohit's Fighters
- Episode 4: Himesh's Warriors vs Shankar's Rockstars
- Episode 5: Shaan's Strikers vs Shreya's Superstars
- Episode 6: Mika's Blasters vs Mohit's Fighters
- Episode 7: Shreya's Superstars vs Shankar's Rockstars
- Episode 8: Shaan's Strikers vs Mohit's Fighters
- Episode 9: Mika's Blasters vs Himesh's Warriors
- Episode 10: Shankar's Rockstars vs Mohit's Fighters
- Episode 11: Shreya's Superstars vs Himesh's Warriors
- Episode 12: Shreya's Superstars vs Mika's Blasters
- Episode 13: Shaan's Strikers vs Mika's Blasters
- Episode 14: Himesh's Warriors vs Mohit's Fighters
- Episode 15: Shankar's Rockstars vs Shaan's Strikers

== Celebrity guests ==
- Episode 6: Uday Chopra and Priyanka Chopra for the promotion of Pyaar Impossible
- Episode 8: Shahid Kapoor and Genelia D'Souza for the promotion of Chance Pe Dance
- Episode 11: Shahrukh Khan and Karan Johar for the promotion of My Name Is Khan
- Episode 13: Arshad Warsi and Vidya Balan for the promotion of Ishqiya
- Episode 17: Sharman Joshi and Tabu for the promotion of Toh Baat Pakki
- Episode 18: Farhan Akhtar and Deepika Padukone for the promotion of Karthik Calling Karthik
