= Sara Raza Khan =

Pakistani singer

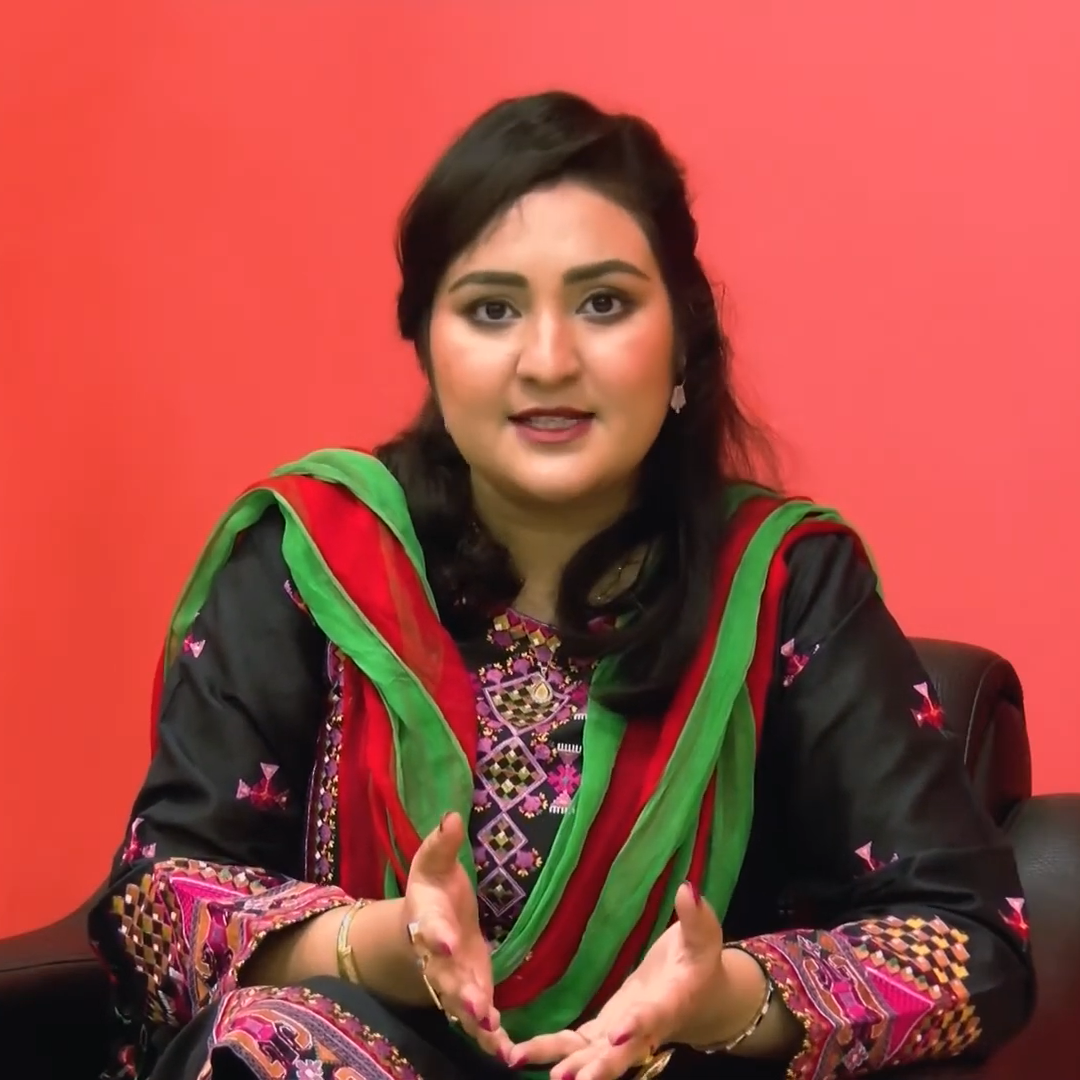
- Khan in 2020

Background information
- Born: Sara Raza Khan
- Genres: Pakistani classical music, Ghazal
- Occupation: Singer
- Instrument: Vocals

Sara Raza Khan also known as Sara Raza, is a Pakistani singer who started her singing career on the television program Sa Re Ga Ma Pa Challenge 2009. She is the winner of the Pakistani reality show Bright Star. She also participated in the singing talent show Sur Kshetra. In 2013, she won Hum Award for Best Original Soundtrack for Mere Qatil Mere Dildar.

== Discography ==
=== Other songs ===
Year	Songs
2012	Mere Dholna
2012	Tere Mere Beech Mein
2012	Wo Ishq Jo Humse Rooth Gaya
2012	Teri Meri, Meri Teri Prem Kahani
2012	Tere Qareeb Aake Hume Zindagi Mili
2012	Pankh Hote To Udh Aati Re
2012	Ajeeb Dastaan Hai Yeh
2012	Nation Awakes
2013	Sirf Geo Per
2013	Gham-e-Dil Ko in Ankhoun Se
2013	Yeh Ada Yeh Naz
2013	Aap ko bhool jayen hum
2013	Ye Ranginiye Nau Bahar
2013	Roshan Meri Ankhon Mein
2013	Paigham-e-Saba (Na`at)
2013	Abhi Na Jao Chod Kar
2013	Mehki Hawaien
2013	Kehkashan

== Film songs ==
Year	Song	Film
2008	"Masha Allah (Female version)"	Karzzzz
2014	"Darbadar"	Na Maloom Afraad
2015	"Dheeray Dheeray"	Wrong No.
2015	"Aisa Jorh Hai"	Jawani Phir Nahi Ani

== Television songs ==
Year	Song	Serial	Channel
2011	"Meray Qatil Meray Dildar"	Meray Qatil Meray Dildar	Hum TV
2012	"Main Chand Si"	Main Chand Si	ARY Digital
2012	"Mere Hazoor"	Mere Hazoor	Express Entertainment
2012	"Madiha Maliha"	Madiha Maliha	Hum TV
2012	"Chirya Mere Aangan Ki"	Chirya Mere Aangan Ki	Geo TV
2012	"Babul"	Babul (TV series)	PTV
2012	"Choti Si Kahani"	Choti Si Kahani	PTV
2012	"Dil Ki Lagi"	Dil Ki Lagi	A-Plus Entertainment
2012	"Kaghaz Ki Nao"	Kaghaz Ki Nao	ATV
2012	"Mera Pyar"	Mera Pyar	A-Plus Entertainment
2012	"Maah-e-Tamam"	Maah-e-Tamam	Express Entertainment
2012	"Meray Dard Ko Jo Zuban Miley"	Meray Dard Ko Jo Zuban Miley	Hum TV
2013	"Mein Hari Piya"	Mein Hari Piya	Hum TV
2015	"Sohni Dharti Allah Rakhey"	Coke Studio (season 8)	Various channels
2016	"Choti Si Zindagi"	Choti Si Zindagi	Hum TV

== Reality shows ==
Year	Show	Role	Channel	Note
2005–2006	Bright Star (TV Series)	Contestant	PTV Home	Won
2008–2009	Sa Re Ga Ma Pa Challenge 2009	Contestant	Zee TV	Eliminated on 7 November 2008
2012	Sur Kshetra	Contestant	Colors TV	Left the show
