= Jetshen Dohna Lama =

Indian child singer and television reality show winner

- Born: April 2013 (age 13); Pakyong district, Sikkim, India
- Occupation: Singer
- Years active: 2022–present

Jetshen Dohna Lama (born April 2013) is an Indian child singer from Pakyong district, Sikkim. She gained recognition after winning the ninth season of the television singing competition Sa Re Ga Ma Pa Li'l Champs in 2023, becoming one of the youngest winners of the franchise.

== Early life ==
Lama was born in April 2013 in Pakyong district in the Indian state of Sikkim. She developed an interest in singing at an early age and began performing publicly as a child.

== Career ==
In 2022, Lama participated in the ninth season of the reality singing competition Sa Re Ga Ma Pa Li'l Champs, broadcast nationally on Zee TV. The season concluded in January 2023, when she was announced as the winner and received a trophy along with a cash prize of ₹10 lakh.

Her performances on the show were noted for vocal maturity and stage presence. Judge Shankar Mahadevan described her as a promising young talent.

In 2024, Lama was selected to represent India at the 2nd International Children's Songwriting Summit "Our Generation" held in Kazan, Russia where young talents from around the world showcased musical creativity.

== Public reception ==
Lama's victory received coverage from national and regional media outlets in India. Her success was widely celebrated in Sikkim where regional media described her win as a significant achievement for young performers from India's northeastern region. Her performances also attracted attention in neighbouring Nepal where media outlets reported on her appearances following the competition.

== See also ==
- Sa Re Ga Ma Pa Li'l Champs 2022
