= Antakshari Intercollegiate Championship =

- Logo of Intercollegiate Antakshari
- Created by: Gajendra Singh
- Directed by: Gajendra Singh
- Starring: Karan Oberoi & Himani Kapoor
- Opening theme: "Titan Antakshari"
- Country of origin: India
- No. of episodes: 26

Production
- Running time: 52 minutes

Original release
- Network: Zee TV
- Release: 1993

Titan Antakshari – Intercollegiate Championship is an Indian musical game show that aired on Zee TV every Friday. The show is a replacement of the Titan Antakshari -L'il Champs.

== Concept ==
Antakshari...Inter college special is hosted by Karan Oberoi and Himani Kapoor. The show is featuring the best and intelligent students of several colleges of India, who will form the three teams: DEEWANE, PARWANE and MASTANE. The contestants of these three teams will criticize each other's teams, and create moments of fun n hungama. Three rounds followed by "Grand Finale". The season-2 finale teams were from Kanpur, Kolkata and Ahemdabad in which Yami & Yashi won.

== Winners ==
Intercollegiate Championship

- Yami Kulshrestha (2007)
- Yashi Kulshrestha (2007)

== Cast ==
Sansui Antakshari

- Annu Kapoor- Host (1994–2006)
- Rajeshwari Sachdev- Co-host (1994–2001)
- Pallavi Joshi- Co-host (2001–2005)

Titan Antakshari

- Sunil Pal- Host (season 1)
- Himani Kapoor- Host
- Karan Oberoi- Host (season 2)

Antakshari – Intercollegiate Championship

- Karan Oberoi – Host
- Himani Kapoor – Host
