= Sa Re Ga Ma Pa Li'l Champs 2020 =

Indian reality television program

- Season 2020
- No. of episodes: 35

Release
- Original network: Zee TV
- Original release: 29 February – 11 October 2020

Season chronology
- ← Previous; 2019 Next → 2022

Sa Re Ga Ma Pa L'il Champs 2020 is an Indian reality television program scheduled to premiere on Zee TV in 2020. The show is a children's singing competition, spin off from Sa Re Ga Ma Pa. It is being hosted by Manish Paul. Previous editions were judged by Alka Yagnik, Udit Narayan, and Kumar Sanu. Sanu and Narayan has been replaced by Himesh Reshammiya and Javed Ali due to other commitments.

The show is the 8th season of the franchise. Aryananda R Babu was announced as the winner of SaReGaMaPa Li’l Champs 2020, and Ranita Banerjee and Gurkirat Singh became the first and second runner-up of the show.

== Auditions ==
Sa Re Ga Ma Pa L'il Champs 2020 auditions will be held in several major Indian cities, including Guwahati, Kochi, Bhubaneshwar, Goa, Lucknow, Bengaluru, Kolkata, Chandigarh, Indore, Jaipur, Delhi, Nagpur, and Mumbai.

== Judges ==
Initially, Alka Yagnik, Udit Narayan, and Kumar Sanu were announced as the show's judges.

However, due to other commitments, Narayan, and Sanu has been replaced by Javed Ali, and Himesh Reshammiya.

== Host ==
It was originally reported that Jay Bhanushali would host the 8th season of the franchise. Later, Zee TV confirmed that Manish Paul would take the role instead.

== Contestants ==
=== Winner ===
- Aryananda R Babu

=== 1st Runner Up ===
- Ranita or Ronita Banerjee

=== 2nd Runner Up ===
- Gurkirat Singh

=== Other finalists ===
- Zaid Ali
- Madhav Arora
- Tanishka Sarkar
- Saksham Sonawane

=== Eliminated contestants ===
- Ananya Sharma
- Saee Joshi
- Radhika Mishra
- Somya Sharma
- Bobby Verma
- Satish Kumar
- Hansraj Dash
- Dhaani Saikia

== Grand jury ==
The 30 Grand Jury members are as follows:

- Aneek Dhar
- Abhay Jodhpurkar
- Sanchita Bhattacharya
- Ram Shankar
- Vaishali Mhade
- Ami Mishra
- Farhad Bhiwandiwala
- Bhavya Pandit
- Raman Mahadevan
- Kiran kamath
- Arpita Mukherjee
- Sarfaraz Ahme
- Vipin Aneja
- Rishikesh Kamerkar
- Shabbir Ahmed
- Hamsika Mani
- Padma Wadekar
- Pawni Pandey
- Arvinder Singh Arv
- Vinod Hasal
- Suzanne D'Mello
- Debojit Saha
- Sumedha Karmahe
- Sanjeevani Bhelande
- Sudhakar Sharma
- Qadir Mustafa
- Soham Chakraborty
- Hrishikesh Chury
- Sandeep Thakur
- Tuheen Chakravorty
- Paroma Dasgupta
- Pradip Saran
- Ghanshyam Vaswani
- Murtuza Mustafa
- Sunil Das
- June Banerjee
- Sairam Iyer
- Uvie

Each member of the jury scores the contestant out of 10 points.

== Accolades ==
- Sa Re Ga Ma Pa Li'l Champs 2020 won Gold for the best children's promo at Promax India 2020 virtual award ceremony.

== Viewership ==
The show topped in UK on its Grand Finale day with highest viewership among any foreign channels. This made Zee TV No.1 in UK that week.
