= Sa Re Ga Ma Pa Challenge USA 2008 =

- Logo
- Created by: Gajjendra Singh
- Directed by: Ranjeet Thakur & T.V. Vinod
- Presented by: Aishwarya Nigam
- Starring: Suresh Wadkar & Aadesh Srivastav
- Opening theme: "Sa Re Ga Ma Pa Challenge 2008 USA"
- Country of origin: India
- Original languages: Hindi; English
- No. of episodes: Total 13

Production
- Camera setup: Multi-camera
- Running time: 60 minutes

Original release
- Network: Zee TV
- Release: 20 June – 27 July 2008

Related
- Sa Re Ga Ma Pa Challenge 2005; Sa Re Ga Ma Pa Challenge 2007; Sa Re Ga Ma Pa Challenge 2009

Sa Re Ga Ma Pa Challenge USA 2008 is an Indian television singing competition show that premiered on 20 June 2008 on Zee TV channel. It is the first instalment of the Sa Re Ga Ma Pa Challenge series in US and the 6th public voting competition in the Sa Re Ga Ma Pa series. Chronologically, the show is preceded by Sa Re Ga Ma Pa Li'l Champs International, however systematically it is followed by Sa Re Ga Ma Pa Challenge 2009.

== Concept ==
Like other singing competitions, the concept of this season of Sa Re Ga Ma Pa is to discover singing talent from the US. Auditions will be held in New York, Chicago, San Francisco, Dallas / Fort Worth and the finals will be recorded in Dallas, Texas.

Host

- Aishwarya Nigam

Judges

- Suresh Wadkar
- Aadesh Srivastav

== Contestants ==
=== Top 20 finalists ===
Male

1. Jeffrey Iqbal – 1st runner-up (27 July 2008)
2. Farhan Zaidi – 2nd runner-up (27 July 2008)
3. Krushanu Majmundar – eliminated (27 July 2008) - semi-finalist
4. Rahul Lakhanpal – eliminated (26 July 2008)
5. Vishal Bhalla – eliminated (25 July 2008)
6. Anand Kannan – eliminated (19 July 2008)
7. Prabhu Shankar – eliminated (18 July 2008)
8. Muhibur Rehman – eliminated (12 July 2008)
9. Praveen Jaligama – eliminated (4 July 2008)
10. Purnash Durgaprasad – eliminated (27 June 2008)

Female

1. Darshana Menon – winner (27 July 2008)
2. Harini Vasudevan – eliminated (27 July 2008) - semi-finalist
3. Ganga Narayanan – eliminated (27 July 2008) - semi-finalist
4. Deeti Majmundar – eliminated (26 July 2008)
5. Soujanya Madabhushi – eliminated (25 July 2008)
6. Supriya Shridharan – eliminated (19 July 2008)
7. Rasika Shekar – eliminated (18 July 2008)
8. Ishmeet Kaur – eliminated (11 July 2008)
9. Ujwala Chinni – eliminated (5 July 2008)
10. Dr. Adeeba Akhtar – dropped out (28 June 2008)
- Note: Contestants Darshana Menon (winner), Jeffrey Iqbal (1st runner-up), & Farhan Zaidi (2nd runner-up) were accepted to participate in Sa Re Ga Ma Pa Challenge 2009 in India.
