= Sa Re Ga Ma Pa Li'l Champs 2019 =

- Season 2019
- Official poster
- No. of episodes: 35

Release
- Original network: Zee TV
- Original release: 9 February – 9 June 2019

Season chronology
- ← Previous; 2017 Next → 2020

Sa Re Ga Ma Pa L'il Champs 2019 is an Indian reality television program that premiered on 9 February 2019 and ended on 9 June 2019 on Zee TV. The series, a children's singing competition, was hosted by Ravi Dubey and judged by Amaal Malik, Richa Sharma and Shaan. It was the 7th season of the franchise and was won by 14-year-old Sugandha Date.

== Format ==
Children aged 5 – 15 years participate in a singing competition. In the auditions round, they have 100 seconds to impress the three judges and the 30-members of the grand jury. If two of the three judges say YES and they secure at least 50 per cent of the support of the Grand Jury, then the contestant progresses to the next round.

In the Gala round, the judges select the 'Student of the Week' who is the best performer according to them. The contestant gets to sit on a 'flying sofa', which indicates that the contestant is safe from next week's elimination.

The last episode would be called as Grand finale and would be crowded winner among the top 7 finalists.

== Grand jury ==
There were 30 jurists who score each contestant up to 10 points for the strength of their performance. The contestants' points were averaged, and if any performer receives 100% her/his performance becomes a "Chartbuster Performance". The jurists were:

== Grand Jury ==
- Abhay Jodhpurkar
- Sanchita Bhattacharya
- Ram Shankar
- Vaishali Mhade
- Ami Mishra
- Farhad Bhiwandiwala
- Bhavya Pandit
- Raman Mahadevan
- Kiran Kamath
- Arpita Mukherjee
- Sarfaraz Ahmed Khan
- Vipin Aneja
- Rishikesh Kamerkar
- Shabbir Ahmed
- Hamsika Iyer
- Padma Wadekar
- Pawni Pandey
- Arvinder Singh Arv
- Vinod Hasal
- Suzanne D'Mello
- Debojit Saha
- Sumedha Karmahe
- Sanjeevani Bhelande
- Sudhakar Sharma
- Qadir Mustafa
- Soham Chakraborty
- Hrishikesh Chury
- Sandeep Thakur
- Tuheen Chakravorty
- Paroma Dasgupta
- Pradip Saran
- Ghanshyam Vaswani
- Murtuza Mustafa
- Sunil Das

== Top 16 Contestants ==
After the "Mega Audition", the show received its top 16 singers, 9 of whom where eliminated in the weeks prior to the finale who are as follows:

- Laisel Rai – eliminated on 24 March 2019
- Abhiroop Kundu – eliminated on 24 March 2019
- Vansh Wadhwa – eliminated on 21 April 2019
- Mithila Mali – eliminated on 21 April 2019
- Swarnali Acharya – eliminated on 12 May 2019
- Aavya Saxena – eliminated on 12 May 2019
- Bhavish Mattu – eliminated on 2 June 2019
- Pickosa Moharkar – eliminated on 2 June 2019
- Ritik Gupta – eliminated on 2 June 2019

=== Top 7 finalists ===
The following top seven finalists went on to the grand finale:

- Sugandha Date – Winner
- Mohammed Faiz – First runner-up
- Pritam Acharya – second runner-up
- Aayush K.C – Finalist
- Anushka Patra – Finalist
- Aastha Das – Finalist
- Swaransh Tiwari – Finalist

=== Contestants ===
Sugandha Date	Winner
Mohammed Faiz	1st Runner up
Pritam Acharya	2nd Runner up
Aayush K.C.	Finalist
Anushka Patra	Finalist
Aastha Das	Finalist
Swaransh Tiwari	Finalist

=== Grand finale ===
In the grand finale the show had 100 piece grand symphony orchestra, a first for Indian television. The show also invited three professional singers:

- Kavita Krishnamurthy
- Kumar Sanu
- Mika Singh

== See also ==
- Sa Re Ga Ma Pa
- Superstar Singer
- The Voice India Kids
