= Udit Narayan =

Indian playback singer (born 1955)

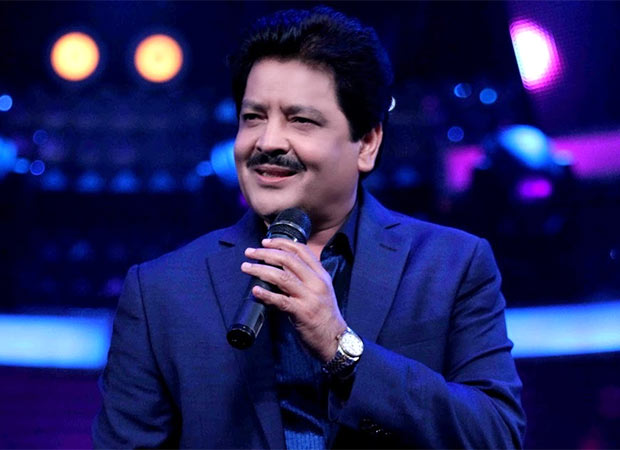
- Narayan in 2019
- Born: Udit Narayan Jha; 1 December 1955 (age 70); Baisi, Supaul district, Bihar, India
- Education: Ratna Rajya Laxmi Campus, Tribhuvan University
- Occupation: Playback singer
- Years active: 1980–present
- Spouses: Ranjana Jha (m. 1984, separated); Deepa Gahatraj (m. 1985)
- Children: Aditya Narayan
- Relatives: Shweta Agarwal (daughter-in-law)
- Awards: Full list
- Honours: Order of Gorkha Dakshina Bahu (2001); Padma Shri (2009); Padma Bhushan (2016)
- Musical career
- Genres: Filmi; pop; Semi-Classical; Bhajan; folk
- Instrument: Vocal
- Labels: Yash Raj Films; T-Series; SKS Music Company; Sony Music; Sony BMG; Tips; Saregama; Venus

YouTube information
- Channel: @RealUditNarayan
- Years active: 2020–present
- Genre: Music
- Subscribers: 3.5 million
- Views: 3.3 billion
- Last updated: 1 December 2025

Udit Narayan Jha (born 1 December 1955;) is an Indian playback singer whose songs are featured in Indian cinema, primarily Hindi films.

He has won four National Film Awards and five Filmfare Awards, with twenty nominations among many others. He won the National Film Award for Best Male Playback Singer three times for the songs Mitwa from Lagaan (2001), Jaane Kyon Log from Dil Chahta Hai (2001), Chhote Chhote Sapne Zindagi Khoobsoorat Hai (2002) and Yeh Taara Woh Taara from Swades (2004). He also won the National Film Award for Best Feature Film in Bhojpuri in 2005 as the producer of Kab Hoi Gawna Hamar. He was awarded the Lata Mangeshkar Award by the Government of Madhya Pradesh in 2015. The Government of India honoured him with the Padma Shri in 2009 and the Padma Bhushan in 2016 for his contribution to arts and culture.

His contribution to the Indian music industry was recognised by Lata Mangeshkar, who bestowed upon him the title Prince of Playback Singing.

He made his Hindi playback debut with Mohammed Rafi in Unees-Bees (1980).

In recognition of his contribution to Nepalese music, the King of Nepal, Birendra Bir Bikram Shah Dev, awarded him the Order of Gorkha Dakshina Bahu in 2001. He is the only male singer in Filmfare Awards history to have won across three decades: the 1980s, 1990s and 2000s.

== Early life ==
Udit Narayan Jha was born on 1 December 1955 in an ethnic Maithil Brahmin family to Nepalese national Harekrishna Jha and Indian national Bhuvaneshwari Jha. When his acceptance of the Padma Shri led to criticism in Nepal, he told the Nepalese daily Kantipur that he was "from Nepal but his mother's home was in Bihar." In a 2017 interview with the Indian magazine Outlook, he clarified that he was born in Baisi, a village in Bihar, and clarified that his father Harekrishna was a native of Nepal. In September 2018, at a ceremony held by the Bihar Jharkhand Association of North America, he stated that he identifies as a Bihari.

== Career ==
=== 1970s: Early career ===
During his teen years, Narayan performed as a staff singer for Radio Nepal and sang in hotels around Kathmandu. He made active efforts to pursue a musical career, which were not supported by his father, who urged him to pursue a profession as a doctor or engineer.

In 1978, he received a music scholarship through a cultural-exchange programme to study classical music at Bhartiya Vidya Bhavan in Mumbai.

While in Mumbai, he visited several music directors' offices and auditioned frequently, initially struggling to secure opportunities.

=== 1980s-90s: Debut and breakthrough ===
Narayan’s Bollywood career began in 1980 when music director Rajesh Roshan offered him his first playback opportunity in the film Unees-Bees, where he recorded a duet with Mohammed Rafi.

His major breakthrough came in 1988 with the soundtrack of Qayamat Se Qayamat Tak, performed with Alka Yagnik. The song Papa Kehte Hain became a nationwide hit and earned him the Filmfare Award for Best Male Playback Singer in 1989.

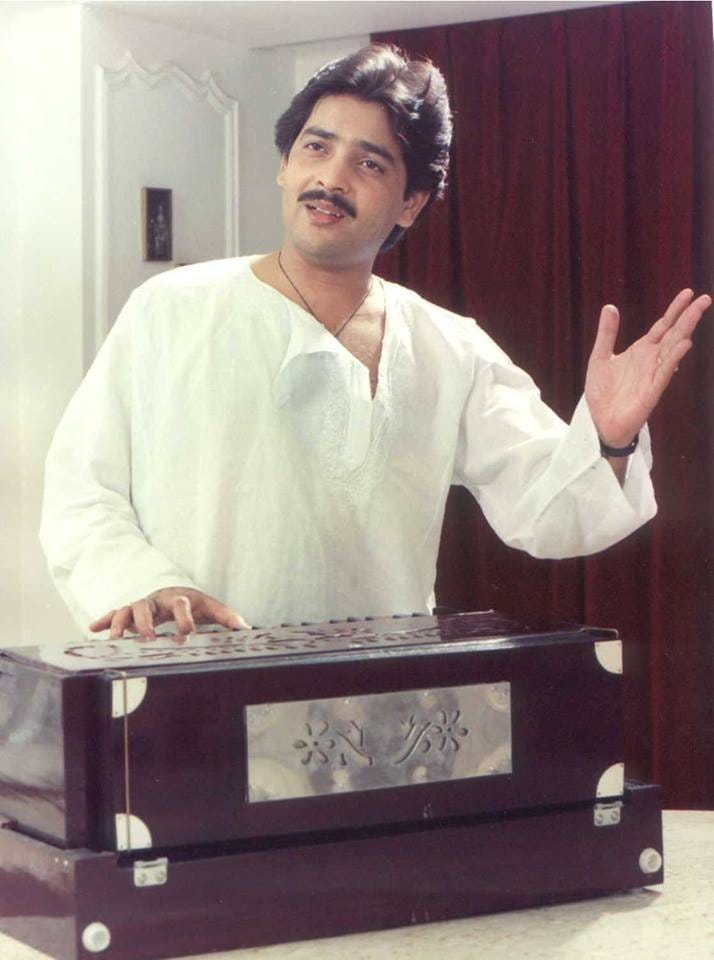
Narayan in 1990s

Narayan won his second Filmfare Award for Best Male Playback Singer for the song Mendi Laga Ke Rakhna from Dilwale Dulhania Le Jayenge at the 1996 Filmfare Awards.

=== 2000s ===
Narayan won his fourth Filmfare Award for Best Male Playback Singer for the song Chand Chhupa Badal Mein from the film Hum Dil De Chuke Sanam (2000), making him the only singer in Filmfare history to win in three different decades.

He won his fifth Filmfare Award for the song Mitwa from the film Lagaan (2001). For the same song, he also won his first National Film Award for Best Male Playback Singer, sharing the honor with his other song Jaane Kyon Log from Dil Chahta Hai (2001). His second National Film Award in this category came for Chhote Chhote Sapne from Zindagi Khoobsoorat Hai (2002), and his third for "Yeh Taara Woh Taara" from Swades (2004). In addition, he won the National Film Award for Best Feature Film in Bhojpuri in 2005 as the producer of Kab Hoi Gawna Hamar.

He received the Padma Shri in 2009.

=== 2010s ===
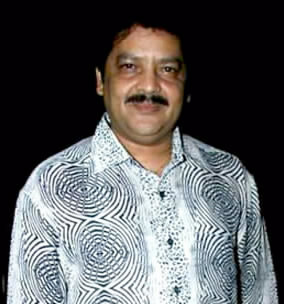
Narayan at an album launch event in 2010

In 2016, Narayan was awarded the Padma Bhushan, India’s third-highest civilian award, in recognition of his contribution to Indian music and playback singing.

== Accolades ==
Narayan has won four National Film Awards and five Filmfare Awards. He was awarded the Order of Gorkha Dakshin Bahu, Fourth Class by the King of Nepal in 2001. In India, he received the Padma Shri in 2009 and the Padma Bhushan in 2016, the Dr. Babasaheb Ambedkar National Contribution Award in 2023, and the International Buddha Peace Award & Dr. B. R. Ambedkar Award in 2023, awarded by the Maitry Peace Foundation. Additionally, in 2012, he served as a jury member for film music at the Global Indian Music Academy Awards.

== Acting career ==
Although primarily known as a playback singer, Narayan also made appearances as an actor, primarily in Nepali cinema.

His most prominent acting role was in the 1985 Nepali film Kusume Rumal, directed by Tulsi Ghimire, in which he both played the lead character and performed the soundtrack.

In interviews, Narayan has stated that he took the acting role to support his career while establishing himself as a singer.

== Personal life ==
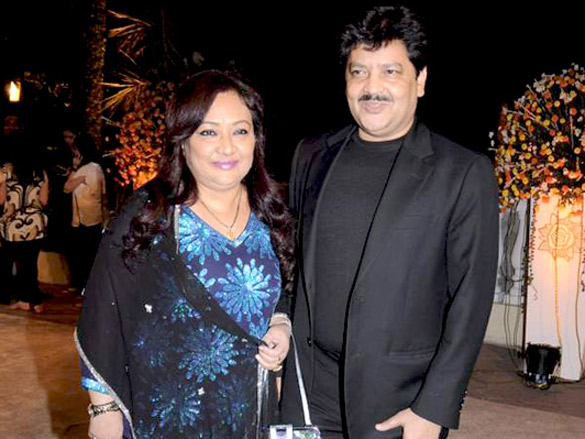
Narayan with his wife Deepa Narayan Jha

In 2006, Ranjana Narayan claimed to be Narayan's first wife, but Narayan consistently denied it. Later, he accepted her as his wife, whom he married in 1984, and promised to provide for her maintenance. Udit began a relationship with Deepa Gahatraj while still married to Ranjana. Udit and Deepa were married in 1985. With Deepa Gahatraj, he has one son, Aditya Narayan, who is also a playback singer.

== See also ==
- List of Indian playback singers
