= Manush: Child of Destiny =

2023 Indian action thriller film

Manush:Child of destiny
- Theatrical release poster
- Directed by: Sanjoy Somadder
- Screenplay by: Sanjoy Somadder Arnab Bhaumik
- Story by: Sanjoy Somadder
- Produced by: Jeet; Gopal Madnani; Amit Jumrani
- Starring: Jeet; Jeetu Kamal; Susmita Chatterjee; Bidya Sinha Saha Mim; Saurav Chakrabarti; Ayanna Chatterjee
- Cinematography: Prosenjit Chowdhury; Soumyadipta Vicky Guin; Songs DOP: Manas Ganguly
- Edited by: Malay Laha
- Music by: Songs: Aneek Dhar; Savvy; Ahmed Humayun; Background score: Anbu Selvan
- Production companies: Grassroot Entertainment; Jeetz Filmworks
- Distributed by: Bengali: Jeetz Filmworks; Hindi: AA Films; Bangladesh: Action Cut Entertainment Pvt. Ltd.
- Release date: 24 November 2023
- Running time: 124 minutes
- Country: India
- Language: Bengali

Manush: Child of Destiny (/mɑːnuʃ/ transl. Human: Child of Destiny) is a 2023 Indian Bengali-language action thriller film written and directed by Sanjoy Somadder, in his directorial debut in Bengali cinema. Produced by Jeet, Gopal Madnani and Amit Jumrani under the banners of Jeetz Filmworks and Grassroot Entertainment. It stars Jeet, Jeetu Kamal, Susmita Chatterjee, Saurav Chakrabarti and Ayanna Chatterjee in her debut, with Bidya Sinha Saha Mim in a special appearance. It follows Arjun Mukherjee, an NCB officer on the board to bring down the drug lord Chhota Mannan, turns to the drug world due to the circumstances, while the latter changes his path finding solace in religion.

Initially titled as Dwitiyo Purush, the film was announced with its official title in November 2022. Principal photography commenced in January 2023 and wrapped by July 2023. Major portions of the film are shot in Kolkata, Howrah and Purulia, with foreign locations in Bangkok and Pattaya. The soundtrack of the film is composed by Aneek Dhar, Savvy and Ahmed Humayun, while Anbu Shelvan provided its score. Prosenjit Chowdhury and Soumyadipta Vicky Guin handled its cinematography and the editing was done by Malay Laha.

Manush theatrically was released on 24 November 2023 simultaneously in Bengali and Hindi in India, making it the third Bengali Pan-Indian film after Chengiz (2023) and Bagha Jatin (2023), while its Bangladesh release was on 15 November 2023. Opening to highly positive reviews from critics and audience alike with specific appraisals of Jeet and Kamal's performances, storyline, script and action sequences, the film became an average success.

== Plot ==
A mysterious man disguised as a doctor, enters a morgue and suddenly performs surgery on a corpse. He brings out a number of pouches full of drugs from inside the body, which were already being smuggled inside the dead man's stomach. Immediately after his departure, when the deceased's family members started a commotion, a renowned officer of the Kolkata Police Department, ACP Mandira Sanyal arrives there to solve the mystery. After special investigation, she realizes that this is a completely new technique of drug trafficking, where the products are being smuggled inside the stomachs of dead people. According to the information, someone uses to double-cross and kills the sub-ordinates after learning all the details of the smuggling movements from them. Then she comes to the conclusion that the sole mastermind behind this incident and the doctor in disguise was none other than Victor, a notorious dealer in the drug world and codenamed "V", whose face was unknown to the police records accordingly.

Mandira first interrogates Majid about this drug ring, who once worked under Mannan Sheikh alias "Chhota Mannan". He then tells her about Masud, who started his journey in the crime world with Mannan since their initials, and lost both his legs after falling under a lorry while saving Mannan from a police shootout, four years before. Mandira and her team immediately goes for interrogation with Masud, who assures them that Mannan may not be alive anymore, because there is a signature of being alive. A sketch artist brought in and a sketch of Mannan is made on the basis of Masud's description. Hardly has their enquiry been ended, when Mannan is reported to now be running an ashram for disabled children in Purulia.

Mandira brings Mannan to the police custody for interrogation, who was beyond the reach of the police. In spite of not being associated with the underworld, Mannan, who lives a simple life, readily reveals that the real mastermind behind this new trend of drug ring and double-crossing is Arjun Mukherjee, the daredevil and a former officer of NCB. Mandira gets shocked to know this, as she was an admirer of Arjuna's honesty. Mannan then narrates the past incidents involving him and Arjun.

It tells the story of hope and redemption, having emotion in every inch. Arjun is a middle class honest police officer who loves his daughter more than anything and can go to any extent for her whereas his enemy Mannan is a notorious drug dealer and ruthless criminal. However certain circumstances slowly change Arjun into an inhuman seeking money which makes Arjun become a drug lord and criminal named ‘Victor’. He is suspended from his job and continues to deal with drugs in the underworld for money whereas Mannan leaves the underworld by stopping all his crimes and starts to live a peaceful life by helping poor children after being diagnosed with advanced stage rare blood cancer. Soon the wheel of fate moves around making Victor realise that an enemy can also be a true friend. How they will both succeed to win the game of survival and fight the battle of destiny to become a true human being forms the rest of the story.

== Cast ==
- Jeet as Arjun Mukherjee, NCB officer / Victor, a wanted drug lord
- Jeetu Kamal as Mannan "Chhota" Sheikh
- Susmita Chatterjee as Kajal
- Ayanna Chatterjee as Mili Mukherjee, Arjun's daughter
- Saurav Chakravarti as Akbar, Mannan's right-hand man, later rival drug lord
- Bidya Sinha Saha Mim as Assistant commissioner of police Mandira Sangal
- Pradip Dhar as Arjun's boss
- Prantik Banerjee as Kuntal
- Somnath Kar as Akbar's henchman
- Vascar Dev as Arjun's friend
- Debapratim Dasgupta as Masud
- Debashis Nath as Majid

=== Special appearance ===
- Kaushik Chakraborty as Diwan ji
- Sumit Ganguly as an Aslam, a drug dealer

== Production ==
=== Development ===
After the success of Badsha (2016) and Boss 2: Back to Rule (2017), it was reported that Jeet might do several Indo-Bangladesh joint ventures; however it was proved to be a rumour. Later in October 2021, it was reported that Sanjoy Somadder, visited Jeet at his residence and narrated a script titled Dwitiyo Purush, which impressed him. The project was supposed to be the actor's 55th film as a leading actor, but that position instead went to Chengiz (2023). It was also reported that Mosharraf Karim, who had previously made his debut in Bengali cinema with Bratya Basu's Dictionary (2018), would be seen sharing screen with Jeet.

Reports of a potential collaboration between Somadder and Jeet continued through July 2022. The following August, Somadder confirmed there were discussions for him to direct Jeet's 56th film. The project was funded by and Jeetz Filmworks and Grassroot Entertainment, while Gopal Madnani and Amit Jumrani served as a co-producer. The company made a public announcement on the occasion of Jeet's birthday on 30 November 2022, confirming the project and its official title Manush. Somadder revealed that Manush was inspired by Uttam Kumar starrer 1973 film Roudro Chhaya, which itself was based on a story by Bimal Kar and also was remade in Bangladeshi as Porichoy in 1974, where Abdur Razzak replaced Kumar. According to Somadder, "It inspired me to write Manush. Roudro Chhaya left its mark on me and from that this movie was born. Manush is my tribute to Uttam Kumar and Razzak, the legends".

"Uttam Kumar starrer Roudro Chhaya is my first inspiration for Manush. I can assure that this is a complete cinematic experience that promises to captivate audiences with its compelling narrative, emotions, action sequences, music, and outstanding performances by Jeet Da and Jeetu (Kamal). The film's storyline contains thought-provoking elements that will undoubtedly resonate with viewers. Also, the movie will introduce a new dimension to the action genre as we are working with Ravi Ji (Verma). It's an honour for me that a superstar from another country has entrusted me with the responsibility of directing the film. Jeet Da is, of course, a superstar and known for his method acting skills. From listening to stories, script narration and shooting to dubbing, I have seen him work with utmost seriousness throughout the entire process. He is a complete director's actor on set. His dedication is unwavering. Yet, when it comes to rejuvenating everyone around him, his fantastic sense of humour captivates everyone. Jeet Da shows immense respect and affection for talented individuals."

— Sanjoy Somadder on Manush and directing Jeet in an interview to The Business Standard.

=== Pre-production ===
It took Somadder nearly four months for the writing and pre-production. He co-wrote the film's screenplay along with Arnab Bhaumik, in his third consecutive collaboration with Jeet after working on Baazi (2021) and Raavan (2022). Both of them joined the writing team in mid-July 2022. A muhurat puja was held on 2 December 2022, at Grassroot Entertainment's office in Kolkata with the film's cast and crew.

In mid-January 2023, Prosenjit Chowdhury was announced as cinematographer, marking his maiden collaboration with both Samadder and Jeet. Aneek Dhar and Savvy were revealed to compose the music, in their respective second and fifth consecutive film with Jeet. The production house further retained most of the technicians from its previous ventures including editor Malay Laha, background scorer Anbu Shelvan and dance choreographer Imran Sardhariya. Manas Ganguly joined the team as its director of photography for the song sequences. Ravi Verma was hired to design the action sequences in the second collaboration with Jeet after Raavan.

=== Casting ===
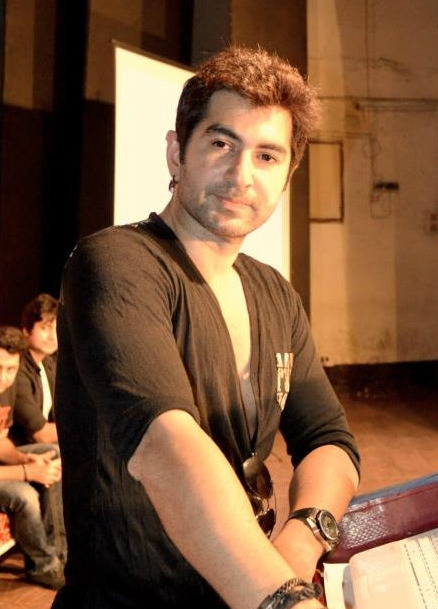
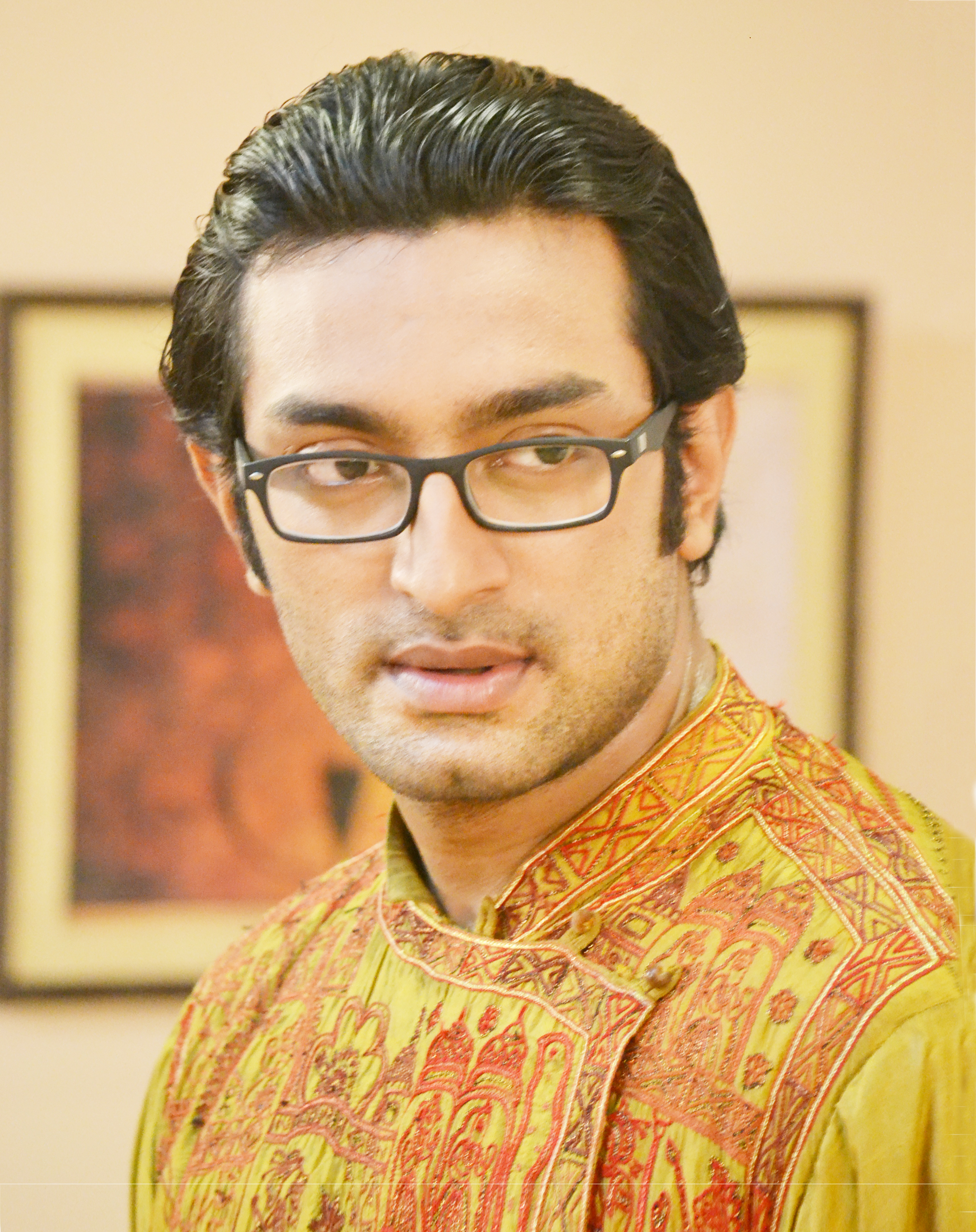
Jeet and Jeetu Kamal were cast as the two central characters of the film.

Jeet would sport a brown-shaded hairstyle for his character, which was finalised after 30 different looks. In August 2022, Karim was reported to opt out of the project. There were rumours that Prosenjit Chatterjee would replace him, while it was later revealed that Jeetu Kamal would be seen in the film, who was then working with Jeet in the reality show Ismart Jodi on Star Jalsha. Kamal agreed to be a part of the project, after being impressed by the one-line narrated for the film. Susmita Chatterjee was cast as the female lead, pairing opposite Jeet for the second time after Chengiz. In December 2022, Bangladeshi actress Bidya Sinha Saha Mim was also reported to join the film in an important role, in her second collaboration with Jeet after Sultan: The Saviour (2018). For an antagonistic role, Somadder initially wanted Taskeen Rahman to play, but the latter declined due to scheduling conflicts. The same month, Saurav Chakrabarti came on the board, marking his fourth film with Jeet after working on his debut film Game (2014), Shesh Theke Shuru (2019) and Panther (2019).

"Jeet Da gave me an opportunity when I was struggling. Not every person gives a struggling artist a chance. Once the ball starts to roll, it continues but in the beginning, it needs a thrust. Jeet Da, gave me that. I still remember how he placed his hand on my chest and asked me to breathe, when I was too anxious during the shoot. He never let me feel that I am a newcomer and he is the Superstar Jeet. He once came to pick me up from home during the shooting of Game. That was just a start. I have done three projects already with him and the fourth one will start rolling soon."

— Saurav Chakrabarti on his fourth collaboration with Jeet in an interview to The Times of India

On 14 December 2022, the star cast was announced by the makers. Later, it was reported that Debapratim Dasgupta, Kaushik Chakraborty, Pradip Dhar and Prantik Banerjee would play prominent roles in the film. All of their inclusion was confirmed by the production house in late-January 2023. In March 2023, Sumit Ganguly was seen present at the film's shooting in Howrah, confirming his presence in the film. Sulagna Mukherjee and Vascar Dev were also confirmed after participating in the film's Purulia schedule, while the former was reportedly cast in a major role throughout the film.

=== Filming ===
Principal photography began with the first schedule on 16 January 2023 at NT-1 Studio in Kolkata. Minor portions of the film were held at Howrah and Nonapukur in the last week of January and Mim joined the team in this schedule. She shot some of his portions in Purulia, where Kamal and Dasgupta also were observed. It continued till 23 January and the second schedule commenced on 1 February. During this schedule, footage of Jeet was leaked and went viral, prompting the film's official technology security partner to warn people against sharing leaked content or they would be deleted. Furthermore, most of the cast and crew members were prohibited from using mobile phones on the sets, to prevent leakage of stills and videos from the shoot. On 27 February, Dasgupta tweeted that he had completed filming his portions for the film.

The film was wrapped up on 30 June 2023. The total filming was completed in 40 days, whereas the climax itself was shot at a jute mill in Titagarh, for three days. Major portions of the film were shot at Kolkata, Purulia and Thailand. Susmita Chatterjee performed stunts riding on Royal Enfield and completed the training for the sequence in 10 days.

== Music ==
The music of the film was composed by Aneek Dhar, Savvy and Ahmmed Humayun, while the background score was composed by Anbu Shelvan. The Bengali lyrics were written by Srijato, Pranjal, Sanjoy Somaddar and Rivo while the Hindi lyrics were written by Shloke Lal, Prashant Ingole and Panchhi Jalonvi.

The singers are Sonu Nigam, Shreya Ghosal, Rupam Islam, Shashwat Singh and Abhay Jodhpurkar.

The first single, titled "Tumi Amari Hobe" in Bengali and "Udd Jaun Tere Sang" in Hindi, was released on 31 October 2023. The second single in both the languages were released on 14 November 2023. The third single was released on 20 November 2023. The fourth single was released on 22 November 2023.

Manush: Child of Destiny

Soundtrack album by Aneek Dhar and Savvy
- Recorded: 2023
- Studios: Playhead Studio; Wow & Flutter Studios; Studio 504; Roots Music Factor; WCZ Studio; Shraanti Studios; Jam8 Studios
- Genre: Feature film soundtrack
- Languages: Bengali, Hindi
- Label: Grassroot Entertainment

Aneek Dhar chronology
Chengiz (2023)	Manush (2023)	Mirza: Part 1 - Joker (2024)

Savvy chronology
Raavan (2022)	Manush (2023)	Khadaan (2024)

=== Bengali ===
No.	Title	Lyrics	Music	Singer(s)	Length
1.	"Tumi Amari Hobe"	Sanjoy Somadder, Pranjal	Savvy	Shashwat Singh	4:03
2.	"Aay Bristi"	Rivo, Pranjal	Aneek Dhar	Shreya Ghosal, Abhay Jodhpurkar	3:23
3.	"Manush Title Track"	Sanjoy Somaddar	Ahmmed Humayun	Rupam Islam	2:37
4.	"Aador Diye Chui"	Srijato	Savvy	Sonu Nigam	3:51

=== Hindi ===
No.	Title	Lyrics	Music	Singer(s)	Length
1.	"Udd Jaun Tere Sang"	Shloke Lal	Savvy	Shashwat Singh	4:03
2.	"Barse Re"	Panchhi Jalonvi	Aneek Dhar	Shreya Ghosal, Abhay Jodhpurkar	3:23
3.	"Manush Title Track"	Prashant Ingole	Ahmmed Humayun	Rupam Islam	2:37
4.	"Din Ka Hai Tara Mera Tu"	Prashant Ingole	Savvy	Sonu Nigam	3:51

== Marketing ==
The first look of Jeet from the movie was released on 19 September 2023 on the occasion of Ganesh Chaturthi. The second poster was released on 24 October, on the occasion of Bijaya Dashami. The third poster was released 28 October 2023, on the day of Lakshmi Puja. A third poster was released one day prior to the trailer on 9 November 2023.

The Bengali teaser of the film was released on 14 October 2023 on the occasion of Mahalaya. The Hindi teaser was released one day later, on 15 October 2023. The Hindi and Bengali trailers were dropped on 10 November 2023 on Grassroot Entertainment's YouTube channel. It was promoted at an event in New Delhi on 21 November 2023.

== Release ==
=== Theatrical ===
Manush was theatrically released on 24 November 2023 in standard and HDR formats. Apart from its original Bengali language, it was also released in Hindi.

The Hindi-language version of the film, which was also released at this same point in time, was released uncut with an 18 classification by the BBFC for strong bloody violence, with the original Bengali-language version of the film subsequently getting the same classification on 12 October 2023.

Jaaz Multimedia bought the distribution rights of Manush in Bangladesh. Expected to have its release in Bangladesh on the same day as its worldwide release, it was later delayed because of the aforementioned distribution company's coming out. Finally on 15 December 2023, it released there with uncut version.

=== Distribution ===
Grassroot Entertainment and PVR Cinemas distributed the film in West Bengal with 632 shows. In Maharashtra and Andhra Pradesh, AA Films acquired the distribution rights of the film. Action Cut Entertainment acquired the distribution rights of the film in Bangladesh.

== Reception ==
=== Critical reception ===
The film was released to highly positive reviews from the critics and audience praising the story plot, editings, action sequences and Jeet's acting. Suparna Majumder of Sangbad Pratidin rated the film 4 out of 5 stars and wrote "The movie speaks about drug lords, a helpless father and the fight for survival. A complete action potboiler bound by an emotional father-daughter story, Jeet fans will enjoy the film." The film was rated 3/5 stars by Poorna Banerjee of Times of India, who addressed its storyline to be rather predictable, quoted "Jeet has a penchant for playing characters that have various shades to them and Manush: Child of Destiny is no exception. In the opposite spectrum is Mannan who has risen from abject poverty. Throughout the story, their dynamic seems to be the most interesting, and far easier to watch than the lukewarm chemistry the lead pair displays. Saurav Chakravarti as Akbar adds a good comic element in otherwise serious scenes." She also praised the action choreography, dialogues and editing of the film, but criticized its screenplay. Tanmoy Ghosh of BFR addressed Kamal's performance in the film, who had shown his brilliance as Satyajit Ray in Aparajito (2022) and opined "When the film starts and the title cut is shown, I simply loved the presentation of it, showcasing middle class, poor, rich lifestyles and also the title track of the film sung by Rupam Islam is impressively placed. The film could have more made impact but because of lack of emotions it failed. If you have seen Sanjoy Somadder’s other works like Chorki or Omanush, wonderful works, will make you cry. He is known for emotions but it didn’t happen here." Rating the film 4/5 stars, he also noted the interval scene to be "awe-witnessing" and also added that the fight sequences could not entertain much which it did with Jeet's previous films Raavan (2022) and Chengiz (2023).

Souvik Saha of Cine Kolkata rated the film 3.5 out of 5 stars and wrote " Despite weak screenplay and insufficient character establishment, Jeet’s flawless performance, visually appealing cinematography, background music and thrilling action scenes makes it watchable for fans of the genre." Subhadeep Kumar Ganguli of The Movie Blog rated the film 7.6 out of 10 stars and opined "Certain action movies in Bengali cinema are so intense that they can even surpass those of Bollywood. Manush happens to be one such thrilling action movie that can excite you. Even if the story of Manush lacks twists, its gripping narrative is enough to keep you engrossed and will give you an unforgettable cinematic experience that will leave you on the edge of your seat with excitement." Besides praising Jeet and Kamal's performance throughout the film, criticized its core story which lacks twists accordingly. The Top India cited "Samadder has cleverly used Jeet's eyes and actions apart from his method acting to create a picture of dual personality which works perfectly for Victor. The surprise addition in the climax sequence offers some hope and one of the best works by Ravi Verma."

Bongo Banjo gave average rating of 6.7/10 stars and said "The film waves together action, drama, and sweetness, promising an unforgettable cinematic experience. From the gripping narrative to the stellar performances, Manush is a cinematic journey that keeps the audience on the edge of their seats." Ayush Mishra of Janmat Samachar rated the film 4.1 out of 5 stars and quoted "A perfect psychological film with thought-provoking elements, can be considered to Manush. A true Pan-Indian film, Manush sets up as a delight to Jeet fans, and Somadder has deliberately played with the conclusion of the movie that leaves the audience in anticipation of their next collaboration."
