= Bigg Boss Bangla season 1 =

Bigg Boss Bangla
- Season 1
- Season's logo with host Mithun Chakraborty
- Presented by: Mithun Chakraborty
- No. of days: 90
- No. of housemates: 15
- Winner: Aneek Dhar
- Runner-up: Rudranil Ghosh

Release
- Original network: Colors Bangla
- Original release: 17 June – 14 September 2013

Season chronology
- Next → Season 2

Bigg Boss Bangla 1 is the first season of the Bengali version of the Indian reality show Bigg Boss. It premiered on Colors Bangla on 17 June 2013. Mithun Chakraborty was the host for the season. The Grand Finale aired on 14 September 2013 where Aneek Dhar emerged as the winner and Rudranil Ghosh emerged as the runner-up.

== Housemates status ==
Sr	Housemate	Day entered	Day exited	Status
01	Aneek	Day 1	Day 90	Winner
02	Rudhranil	Day 1	Day 90	1st Runner up
03	Koneenica	Day 1	Day 90	2nd Runner-up
04	Sudipta	Day 1	Day 12	Evicted
04	Sudipta	Day 43	Day 90	3rd Runner -up
05	Carlyta	Day 30	Day 84	Evicted
06	Abhijit	Day 1	Day 84	Evicted
07	Mallika	Day 1	Day 26	Evicted
07	Mallika	Day 43	Day 77	Evicted
08	Kartik	Day 10	Day 70	Evicted
09	Nandini	Day 1	Day 63	Evicted
10	Vikram	Day 1	Day 55	Evicted
11	Iris	Day 1	Day 49	Evicted
12	Sampurna	Day 1	Day 42	Evicted
13	Mahesh	Day 1	Day 35	Evicted
14	Manabi	Day 1	Day 21	Evicted
15	Kais	Day 1	Day 7	Evicted

== Housemates ==
The list of contestants in the order of entering the house:

=== Original contestants ===
- Iris Maity – Actress.
- Rudranil Ghosh – Actor.
- Aneek Dhar – Singer.
- Kais Kalim – Gym Trainer.
- Koneenica Banerjee – Actress.
- Mahesh Jalan – Astrologer.
- Mallika Majumdar – Actress.
- Sudipta Chakraborty – Actress.
- Abhijit Burman (Pota) – Singer.
- Nandini Pal – Presenter.
- Manabi Banerjee – Author.
- Sampurna Lahiri – Model, Film Actress.
- Vikram Chatterjee – Film & Television Actor.

=== Wildcard entrants ===
- Kartik Das Baul
- Carlyta Mouhini

== Nominations table ==
	Week 1	Week 2	Week 3	Week 4	Week 5	Week 6	Week 7	Week 8	Week 9	Week 10	Week 11	Week 12	Week 13		
Vote to:	Evict					Save	Evict								
Aneek	Not eligible	Not eligible	Rudranil; Mallika	Rudranil; Mahesh	Carlyta; Abhijit	Nandini; Koneenica	Abhijit; Iris	Carlyta; Nandini	Not eligible	Not eligible	Nominated	No; Nominations	Winner (Day 90)		
Rudranil	Not eligible	Not eligible	Banned	Mallika; Mahesh	Mahesh; Koneenica	Abhijit; Aneek	Koneenica; Aneek	Abhijit; Kartik	Nominated	Not eligible	Nominated	No; Nominations	1st runner-up (Day 90)		
Koneenica	Not eligible	Not eligible	Mallika; Rudranil	Mallika; Sampurna	Rudranil; Iris	Aneek; Carlyta	Iris; Abhijit	Rudranil; Nandini	Not eligible	Nominated	Nominated	No; Nominations	2nd runner-up (Day 90)		
Sudipta	Not eligible	Nominated	Evicted (Day 12)					Rudranil; Kartik	Not eligible	Nominated	Not eligible	No; Nominations	3rd runner-up (Day 90)		
Parames	Not In House							Nominated	Rudranil; Kartik	Not eligible	Nominated	No; Nominations	4th runner-up (Day 90)		
Carlyta	Not In House			Exempt	Aneek; Koneenica	Koneenica; Iris	Iris; Rudranil	Abhijit; Rudranil	Nominated	Nominated	Not eligible	No; Nominations	Evicted (Day 82)		
Abhijit	Not eligible	Not eligible	Banned	Mahesh; Mallika	Koneenica; Aneek	Sampurna; Rudranil	Carlyta; Abhijit	Rudranil; Nandini	Not eligible	Not eligible	Not eligible	No; Nominations	Evicted (Day 80)		
Mallika	Nominated	Not eligible	Abhijit; Rudranil	Rudranil; Mahesh	Evicted (Day 26)			Nandini; Kartik	Nominated	Not eligible	Nominated	Evicted (Day 75)			
Kartik	Not In House		Exempt	Mahesh; Mallika	Mahesh; Aneek	Nandini; Rudranil	Carlyta; Koneenica	Vikram; Abhijit	Not eligible	Nominated	Evicted (Day 68)				
Nandini	Not eligible	Not eligible	Rudranil; Manabi	Mahesh; Mallika	Abhijit; Carlyta	Koneenica; Carlyta	Abhijit; Iris	Carlyta; Vikram	Nominated	Evicted (Day 61)					
Vikram	Not eligible	Not eligible	Banned	Mahesh; Mallika	Koneenica; Aneek	Sampurna; Nandini	Carlyta; Abhijit	Nandini; Rudranil	Evicted (Day 54)						
Iris	Not eligible	Not eligible	Manabi; Rudranil	Mahesh; Mallika	Koneenica; Sampurna	Nandini; Carlyta	Rudranil; Kartik	Evicted (Day 47)							
Sampurna	Not eligible	Not eligible	Manabi; Vikram	Mahesh; Mallika	Carlyta; Mahesh	Rudranil; Vikram	Evicted (Day 40)								
Mahesh	Nominated	Nominated	Abhijit; Rudranil	Rudranil; Vikram	Vikram; Iris	Evicted (Day 33)									
Manabi	Not eligible	Not eligible	Rudranil; Abhijit	Aneek (to evict)	Evicted (Day 19)										
Kais	Nominated	Evicted (Day 5)													
Notes															
Against Public Vote	Kais; Mahesh; Mallika	Mahesh; Sudipta	Abhijit; Manabi; Rudranil	Aneek; Mahesh; Mallika	Aneek; Carlyta; Koneenica; Mahesh	Abhijit; Aneek; Iris; Kartik; Sampurna; Vikram	Abhijit; Carlyta; Iris	Abhijit; Aneek; Carlyta; Koneenica; Rudranil; Vikram	Carlyta; Mallika; Nandini; Rudranil	Carlyta; Kartik; Koneenica; Sudipta	Aneek; Koneenica; Mallika; Rudranil; Sudipta	Abhijit; Aneek; Carlyta; Koneenica; Rudranil; Sudipta	Aneek; Koneenica; Parames; Rudranil; Sudipta		
Re-entered	None							Mallika	None						
Re-entered	None							Sudipta	None						
Evicted	Kais	Sudipta	Manabi	Mallika	Mahesh	Sampurna	Iris	Vikram	Nandini	Kartik	Mallika	Abhijit	Parames	Sudipta	Koneenica
Evicted	Kais	Sudipta	Manabi	Mallika	Mahesh	Sampurna	Iris	Vikram	Nandini	Kartik	Mallika	Carlyta	Rudranil	Aneek	

indicates that the Housemate was directly nominated for eviction.
indicates that the Housemate was immune prior to nominations.
indicates the contestant has been evicted.
indicates the contestant walked out due to emergency.
indicates the contestant has been ejected.
indicates the house captain.
