= Bigg Boss Bangla =

Indian Bengali language Reality show

- Genre: Reality Show
- Based on: Big Brother
- Presented by: Mithun Chakraborty (S1); Jeet (S2); Sourav Ganguly (S3-present)
- Country of origin: India
- Original language: Bengali
- No. of seasons: 3
- No. of episodes: 198

Production
- Production locations: Lonavala (S1–S2); Film City, Mumbai (S3–present)
- Camera setup: Multi-camera
- Running time: 60–90 minutes
- Production companies: Endemol India (S1–S2); Banijay Entertainment (S3–present)

Original release
- Network: Colors Bangla (S1–S2); Star Jalsha (S3–present)
- Release: 17 June 2013 – present

Related
- Bigg Boss

Bigg Boss Bangla is the Bengali-language version of the reality television programme Bigg Boss, based on Big Brother, which aired on Star Jalsha.

The first season was launched on 17 June 2013. It was telecasted on Colors Bangla and hosted by Mithun Chakraborty. The second season was launched on 4 April 2016 and hosted by Jeet. After 10 Years, Bigg Boss Bangla returned with the third season on Star Jalsha with Sourav Ganguly as the new host.

== Overview ==
=== Concept ===
Bigg Boss Bangla is a reality television series based on the Hindi show Bigg Boss, which was also based on the original Dutch Big Brother format developed by John de Mol Jr. A number of contestants (known as "housemates") live in a purpose-built house and are isolated from the rest of the world. Each week, housemates nominate two of their peers for eviction, and the housemates who received the most nominations would face a public vote. Of these, one would eventually leave, having been "evicted" from the House. However, there were exceptions to this process as dictated by Bigg Boss Bangla. In the final week, there were three housemates remaining, and the public voted for who they wanted to win. The housemates in the Bengali version are primarily celebrities.

=== The House ===
The Bigg Boss House is located in the tourist center of Lonavala, Pune district of Maharashtra. It is well furnished and decorated. It has all kinds of modern amenities, one king size bedroom and one royal bath room. There is a garden, pool, activity area and gym in the House. There is also a Confession Room, where the housemates may be called in by Bigg Boss for any kind of conversation, and for the nomination process. The House has no TV connection, no phones, no Internet connection, clocks, pen or paper.

=== Rules ===
While all the rules have never been told to the audience, the most prominent ones are clearly seen. The inmates are not permitted to talk in any other language except Bengali. They always have to wear a lapel. They cannot leave the House premises at any time unless they are evicted or decided by Bigg Boss. They can discuss the nomination process with anyone. They are not allowed to sleep without the permission of Bigg Boss.

=== The 'Eye' Logo ===
Each season gets its own Bigg Boss 'Eye' logo which is similar to the Bigg Boss and Big Brother shows. The first season of Bigg Boss Bangla on Colors Bangla inherited its logo from the sixth season of its Hindi counterpart in the form of a human eye with an eyeball displaying the SMPTE color bars, against a purple, lightning storm background. The second season got its dedicated logo in the form of a more detailed human eye against a background of purple tornado. This logo also had the text 'Season 2' below the 'Eye' and the tagline for the second season was 'Byata Dumukho'. The eye for the third season had humanoid feature, with red and golden accents in the iris. The lens depicted the eye as a mechanical one while the iris had golden tick marks. Additionally, the eye had bold golden eyeliners with subtle tick marks on it indicating eyelashes.

== Series details ==
Series	Host	Episodes	Originally released			Days	Housemates	Prize Money	Winner	Runner-up
Series	Host	Episodes	First released	Last released	Network	Days	Housemates	Prize Money	Winner	Runner-up
1	Mithun Chakraborty	92	17 June 2013	14 September 2013	Colors Bangla	90	15	₹20 lakh (US$21,000)	Aneek Dhar	Rudranil Ghosh
2	Jeet	99	4 April 2016	15 July 2016	Colors Bangla	98	16	₹35 lakh (US$36,000)	Joyjit Banerjee	Priya Paul
3	Sourav Ganguly	TBA	30 August 2026	TBA	Star Jalsha	TBA	TBA	TBA	TBA	TBA

== Housemate pattern ==
Clique	Season 1	Season 2	Season 3
Reality show alumni	Aneek Dhar	Aditi Chakraborty	Rajveer Dey
Reality show alumni	Aneek Dhar	Sandy Rong	Anushka Ghosh
LGBT	Manabi Bandyopadhyay	None	Niranjan Mondal
International star	Carlyta Maria Mouhini	None	Alexandra Taylor
Model	Iris Maity	None	Rajveer Dey
Soap actor	Mallika Mazumdar	Priya Paul	Sonamoni Saha
Soap actor	Mallika Mazumdar	Priya Paul	Monami Ghosh
Soap actor	Mallika Mazumdar	Prity Biswas	Nandini Dutta
Soap actor	Srabanti Banerjee	Kamalika Banerjee	Srijla Guha
Soap actor	Srabanti Banerjee	Kamalika Banerjee	Ranieeta Das
Soap actor	Vikram Chatterjee	Ena Saha	Bharat Kaul
Soap actor	Vikram Chatterjee	Ena Saha	Sayak Chakraborty
Soap actor	Vikram Chatterjee	Ena Saha	Jeetu Kamal
Singer	Abhijit Barman (Pota)	Silajit Majumder	Durnibar Saha
Singer	Kartik Das Baul	Silajit Majumder	Durnibar Saha
Film actor	Rudranil Ghosh	Rii Sen	Monami Ghosh
Film actor	Rudranil Ghosh	Rii Sen	Sourav Das
Film actor	Koneenica Banerjee	Joyjit Banerjee	Anindya Sengupta
Film actor	Sudipta Chakraborty	Mainak Banerjee	Bharat Kaul
Film actor	Sampurna Lahiri	Mainak Banerjee	Sohini Paul
Web Series Actor	None		Joyita Chatterjee
Web Series Actor	None		Srijla Guha
Presenter	Nandini Pal	None	
Entrepreneur	None		Tanushree Roy Das
Comedian	None	Apurbo Roy	Jhilam Gupta
Sports personality	None		Dipendu Biswas
Non-celebrity	Kais Kalim	Mikhail Bora	None
Non-celebrity	Mahesh Jalan	Mikhail Bora	None
Winner	Aneek Dhar	Joyjit Banerjee	
Runner-up	Rudranil Ghosh	Priya Paul	

== See also ==
- Celebrity Big Brother 5 – Controversial series of the UK's Celebrity Big Brother involving Season 2 host Shilpa Shetty and Season 2 Housemate Jade Goody.
- Jade Goody – Appeared on the same British version of Celebrity Big Brother with Season 2 presenter Shilpa Shetty, later to become a Season 2 Housemate.
- Bigg Boss, the pan Indian series aired in seven regional-languages which follows the same format.
