= Jo Jeeta Wohi Super Star 2 =

- Genre: Reality
- Created by: Gajendra Singh
- Presented by: Mandira Bedi
- Judges: Shaan; Shantanu Moitra; Swanand Kirkire
- Opening theme: "Jo Jeeta Wohi Super Star" by Kunal Ganjawala
- Country of origin: India
- Original language: Hindi
- No. of seasons: 2
- No. of episodes: 26

Production
- Cinematography: nitesh choudhary
- Camera setup: Multi-camera
- Running time: Approx. 52 minutes
- Production company: Endemol India

Original release
- Network: STAR Plus
- Release: 31 March – 24 June 2012

Related
- Season 1

Jo Jeeta Wohi Superstar 2 is an Indian reality show which is running on STAR Plus. It is in its 2nd season. Its 1st season premiered on 11 April 2008 and ended on 12 July 2008 now it has again started from 31 March 2012 and its finale was on 24 June 2012 Irfan won the title of Jo Jeeta Wohi Super Star 2, Sreeram took the 2nd place while Akanksha took the 3rd place

== About ==
The show comprises 6 Champions, who are winners of singing reality shows and 12 Challengers, who are popular faces/runners up from the same shows who will compete against each other. The 6 Champions compete on Saturday and the one with the lowest score moves to the Challengers' group. The 12 Challengers battle it out on Sunday – the top 2 performers are up for public voting and the one with the highest number of votes moves to Champions group. The weakest performer of the week is then eliminated

The Champions and the Challengers will be mentored by two well-known music directors, Shaan and Shantanu. They are joined by renowned lyricist Swanand Kirkire on the panel as a judge.

In its journey of 26 episodes, each episode will showcase an innovative musical challenge that has not been witnessed before. With a fresh take on music, the show promises 13 weeks of a never seen before musical extravaganza on Indian Television.

== Participants ==
The Show initiated with contestants divided into two groups - Champions and Challengers. The Champions were participants who have been crowned winners of their respective singing competitions and Challengers were hopefuls who reached close to the coveted title but lost.

Champions

Aneek Dhar
This Bengali boy has a melodious voice and has been a winner all the way. He won the regional music show Sa Re Ga Ma Pa Bangla as well as the Sa Re Ga Ma Pa Challenge 2007. His first solo album "Khwaishein" in 2008 won him many fans and the Kalakar Award in the Best Music Album category. Aneek is a popular playback singer in Bengali films and his foray into Hindi films was with the animation movie "Bal Ganesh" where he sang with Shankar Mahadevan. In 2008 Aneek entertained music lovers with his brilliant performances in the show Ek Se Badhkar Ek. He also played host for some singing shows in Bengali. Last seen on Music ka Maha Muqaabla (2009), Aneek was one of the strong contenders in Shreya Ghoshal's team.

Akanksha Sharma
A 15-year-old girl from Jaipur, Akanksha has always aspired of being a successful playback singer. Her biggest dream in life is to meet Lata Mangeshkar. She has already taken a step towards fulfilling her dreams by winning the Amul Chhote Ustaad title. Basking in its glory, she even wishes to try her hand at acting. The first song that she ever sang was "Shirdi Wale" which she learnt from her father. Studying in class X, Akanksha loves to keep up with the latest trends in style and fashion and has a flair for dancing too. She is very excited to take up new and interesting projects. 2nd Runner Up of JJWS 2.

Sanchita Bhattacharya
Sanchita was declared winner of Sa Re Ga Ma Pa L'il Champs at age 14. This makes her the oldest winner in the history of Sa Re Ga Ma Pa L'il Champs as well as the first female winner through public voting. She was also a participant of the show Ek Se Badhkar Ek. Sanchita has lent her voice for playback in a few Bengali films, with "Bal Ganesh" being her debut in Hindi film music. She has been training in music since 1996 and is a very versatile singer. She tries to sing songs from various genres and aspires to become a successful playback singer in the future.

Sreeram
Sreeram is a professional singer and the winner of Indian Idol 2010. Located in Hyderabad, he made his playback debut in Telugu films. Despite his non-musical background, Sreeram had a passion towards singing that was nurtured during his school and college days. He started performing shows at the age of 8 and has done about 80 stage shows including classical and film music. He has had the opportunity to sing in the magnum opus The Chronicles of Narnia: The Voyage of the Dawn Treader which released in Hindi, Tamil and Telugu, alongside its English version. It is a mighty accomplishment, as he is not only the first-ever Hyderabadi to have a song featured in a Hollywood film but also the only artist from Asia collaborating with Fox. He is even the first south Indian who won Indian Idol and he is also the Runner Up of JJWS 2.

Hemant Brijwasi
Hemant is the youngest singer of the lot who began at the age of 9 and has won rave reviews ever since. This Mathura boy not only made it to the final 12 but went on to emerge as the winner of Sa Re Ga Ma Pa Lil Champs in 2009. Since then, there has been no looking back for the small wonder. An ace in Sufi and Classical singing, he gained acclaim from music maestros like Wadali brothers, Asha bhonsle, Anandji and Suresh Wadkar. Hemant's latest commercial work is a jingle for Fevicol. He is working on gaining versatility in singing by learning other genres of music. He aspires to follow his dream of making it big in the music industry.

Vaishali Mhade
27 year old Vaishali from Maharashtra is the winner of Sa Re Ga Ma Pa Challenge 2009 and the Marathi version of Sa Re Ga Ma Pa in 2008. Her life revolves around being a singer, wife and mother with equal enthusiasm. A versatile and consistent singer, she says her husband has been a great support in her singing career. She has sung the title track of the Marathi daily soap called "Kulvadhu" and also lent her voice for Shridhar Phadke's album. She made her Bollywood singing debut with a song in the movie Damadamm.

Challengers

Mohammed Irfan

- Mohammed Irfan is a fitting example for the phrase 'looks can be deceptive'. This soft-spoken, shy and timid boy sets the stage on fire when he performs. was a contestant of Star Voice of India - Season One and has come a long way since then. He is from Hyderabad. He has had the opportunity to sing for the film Raavan that had music by A. R. Rehman. He has also lent his voice to the famous romantic song Phir Mohabbat in Murder 2. He is the winner of JJWS 2.

Rehman Ali
A 27 year old Thumri and Gazal singer from Jaipur, Rehman Ali had never thought he would sing Bollywood numbers one day. Music runs in his blood as he has inherited this art from his grandfather Ustad Banne Khan who is a singer himself. Rehman is very passionate about singing and has not lost hope for it even the worst financial circumstances. He has given several stage performances and was very proud to be a part of Shreya Ghoshal's team in Music Ka Maha Muqaabla. He is also associated with a cultural society in Jaipur called "Saaz or Awaaz".

Sharib Sabri
Delhi based Sharib Sabri is born to a family of musicians. His father is associated with Indian classical music while his younger brother Toshi Sabri is a singer and music director. Toshi was a contestant in Amul STAR Voice of India and Sharib was a finalist on Sa Re Ga Ma Pa Challenge 2005. Sharib was also a contestant at Music Ka Maha Muqqabla (2009) in Shankar Mahadevan's team. He and his brother have been music directors for several movies namely 'Jashn' 'Phirr' and 'Jail'. He has also been a playback singer for some of these films. Talented and dynamic he likes to experiment with different genres of music.

Shivamm Pathak
A boy from Lakhimpur, a small district in U.P., Shivamm has proved himself as a performer through the various rounds of Indian Idol. He handles various styles ranging from classical to contemporary with equal ease. He came to Mumbai for his networking course but also pursued his passion for music from Ajivasan, Mumbai. Sonu Nigam is his idol and he wishes to be a playback singer just like him. He has also been a playback singer for the film MOD.

Anweshaa
Anweshaa, an 18-year-old from Kolkota was the runner up of Chotte Ustad in 2007. She was also a participant in Music Ka Maha Muqaabla. At the age of 4, Anweshaa started her training under Shri Jayanta Sarkar, a leading personality in Indian classical music. She is guided by her mother in light music. Anweshaa is dedicated to her music and performs 4 hours of riyaz daily. She has been a playback singer for some Bengali and Tamil films and her Bollywood debut was with a song from Golmal Returns.

Sonia Sharma
This little bundle of melody was a participant in Amul Star Voice of India – Chhote Ustaad and also won a Special Jury Award in the show. She is a multi-talented girl and wanted to become a doctor before she finally realised her dream of becoming a singer. She loves playing the harmonium, guitar, tabla, and sitar and is a talented dancer. She had the privilege to perform in Ravindra Natya Mandir, Mumbai on the occasion of Lata Mangeshkar's 80th birthday celebration in 2009. Her fan following continues to grow with every live performance because of her vivacity and interaction with the audience.

Torsha Sarkar
A finalist on an Indian music reality show, Torsha maintains that she is the opposite of what her name really means- 'a turbulent river' although she would like to alter her shyness towards the camera if given a chance. Music is her passion and she has been learning semi classical music since she was 8. Torsha regards her mother, who is also a good singer, a great support and Shreya Ghoshal as her inspiration to sing. She likes reading fiction and surfing the internet. Alka Yagnik, Shreya Ghoshal and Kailash Kher are among her favourite singers.

Nihira Joshi
Nihira Joshi was a finalist in the Sa Re Ga Ma Pa Challenge 2005 and mega final winner of Aao Jhoomein Gaayen on SAB TV (2001). A B.A. student from Mithibai College, Mumbai she is a popular voice on Indian television. She has sung the title song of the Ekta Kapoor serial Kasamh Se on Zee TV and the Radio City theme song with Shaan. Several sequence songs for popular Hindi daily soaps and title tracks for a few Marathi serials have also been sung by her. She was nominated for Best Title Singer in Indian Telly Awards 2006 for her title song in Balaji Telefilms' Kasamh Se. She has had an opportunity to sing in the Hindi film industry with artists like Sunidhi Chauhan and Udit Narayan in Bunty aur Babli, and also had a solo soundtrack. Nihira is fond of learning languages and is learning Spanish.

Harpreet Deol
Harpreet was amongst the finalists in a reality music show in 2007. His favourite personalities are Shaheed Bhagat Singh and Mohammed Rafi. A student of Punjab University, Harpreet loves singing and sleeping. He has gained popularity in Punjab and has performed at numerous stage shows. He is working on a new album. He is very excited to be on the 'Challengers' team and hopes to give his best on 'Jo Jeeta Wohi Superstar'.

Rajdeep Chatterjee
Rajdeep Chatterjee from Jamshedpur has been learning music from the age of two. He enjoys classical music and can play the tabla. His moment of pride was when he performed and shared the stage with music directors Shankar-Ehsaan-Loy. Rajdeep has participated in various competitions and even won the title of the Jharkhand Idol.

== Judges ==
=== Shaan ===
What do the songs, chaand sifarish jo karta hamari... jab se tere naina... and musu musu hasi... have in common? It is the lilting voice of Shaan! Son of music composer, late Manas Mukherjee and brother to pop singer Sagarika, music runs in his blood. He began his journey in the music industry with ad-jingles at a very early age and has emerged as one of the most popular singers in recent times.

=== Shantanu Moitra ===
An innovative music director, Shantanu Moitra is known for his experimental yet melodious compositions. He started his career as a client servicing executive at an ad agency while music remained a hobby. His ad jingles were an instant success and this paved his way to become a music director. Some of his excellent music scores were in collaboration with Shubha Mudgal for albums like Ab ke Sawan, Mann ke Manjeere etc.

=== Swanand Kirkire ===
Swanand Kirkire is a multi-talented artist who has worn many hats in the field of music. He is a singer, lyricist, composer, writer and also an actor. His lyrics in the song Bawra mann... from Hazaaron Khwaishein Aisi brought him vast recognition. He is also the lyricist for some prominent Bollywood blockbusters like Parineeta, Lage Raho Munna bhai, Paa and 3 Idiots. Swanand has won the National award for Best Lyrics twice for his songs.

== Host ==
Mandira Bedi

One of the most popular faces on Indian television, Mandira Bedi hardly needs an introduction. She began her career as the central character in India's first daily soap. She has presented many Indian TV Reality shows including the successful first season of Jo Jeeta Wohi Superstar. Mandira is back once again to host the second season of the show with zest and élan.

== Elimination Table ==
Week	1	2	3	4	5	6	7	8	9	10	11	12	13	14	15
Irfan	Challenger	Champion								Challenger		Champion			Winner
Shreeram	Champion														1st Runner-up
Akanksha	Champion						Challenger								2nd Runner-up
Anweshaa	Challenger				Champion										Eliminated
Aneek	Champion				Challenger			Champion						Eliminated	
Sharib	Challenger					Champion							Eliminated		
Shivamm	Challenger				Eliminated			Wild Card Entry	Challenger			Eliminated			
Sanchita	Champion			Challenger							Eliminated				
Rehman	Challenger										Eliminated				
Vaishali	Champion	Challenger		Champion		Challenger					Eliminated				
Nihira	Challenger									Eliminated					
Sonia	Challenger						Eliminated								
Hemant	Champion	Challenger				Eliminated									
Torsha	Challenger			Eliminated											
Harpreet	Challenger		Eliminated												
Rajdeep	Challenger	Eliminated													
Eliminated	Rajdeep	Harpreet	Torsha	Shivamm	Hemant	Sonia	No Elimination		Nihira	Vaishali	Shivamm	Sharib	Aneek	Anweshaa	Akanksha Sreeram
Eliminated	Rajdeep	Harpreet	Torsha	Shivamm	Hemant	Sonia	No Elimination		Nihira	Rehman	Shivamm	Sharib	Aneek	Anweshaa	Akanksha Sreeram
Eliminated	Rajdeep	Harpreet	Torsha	Shivamm	Hemant	Sonia	No Elimination		Nihira	Sanchita	Shivamm	Sharib	Aneek	Anweshaa	Akanksha Sreeram

Winner
1st Runner-up
2nd Runner-up
Contestant belonging to the category "Champions".
Contestant belonging to the category "Challengers".
Contestant returned as a wild card entrant and joined the competition as a challenger.
Contestant eliminated.
