= Prabhu Tare Pagathiye =

Studio album by Omkar Dave, Mauli Dave & Hemant Dave
- Released: September 2006
- Recorded: September 2006
- Genre: Bhajan
- Producer: Dipti Dave

Prabhu Tare Pagathiye is the first audio album of Omkar Dave and Mauli Dave.

This CD contains most of the Bhajans in Gujarati with one Bhajan in Hindi. The CD starts with Shloka for Lord Shiva and ends with "Vaishnavajan To Tene Re Kahiye" the well known Bhajan by Narasinh Mehta.

The music has been composed by Omkar. Music arrangement is also by Omkar. Mauli, Omkar, and Hemant have provided the vocals. The chorus is provided by Sanvari, Jalaj, and Kajari. The producer is Dipti Dave.

The audio CD was recorded in June, 2006 at Mrudang Studio, Ahmedabad and published in September 2006.

== Track listing ==
1. Shiv Stuti
2. Khap Khap MaakhaN Chor
3. Karjo Karjo Naiyaa Paar
4. Jay Raghunandan Jay Siyaaraam
5. Prabhu Taare Pagathiye
6. Kaanji Taari Maa
7. O Bhai
8. Raamdoot Shri Jay Hanumaan
9. Bhaj Govind
10. VaishNavjan To
