= Mauli Dave =

Indian singer, actress, dancer, and television host

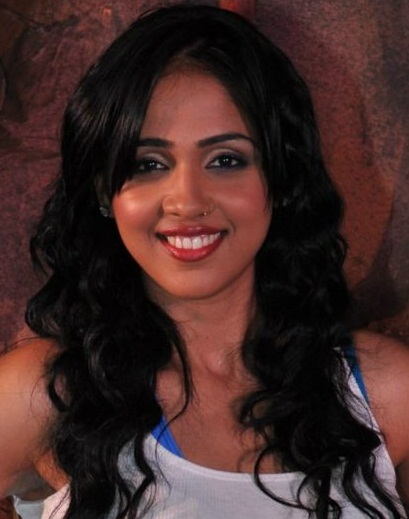
- Dave at Khatron Ke Khiladi 2011 press conference

Background information
- Born: 3 June 1987 (age 39)
- Origin: Ahmedabad, Gujarat, India
- Genre: Filmi / Bollywood
- Occupations: Singer, dancer, host, actress
- Instruments: Vocals, tabla
- Years active: 2004–2014

Mauli Dave (born 3 June 1987) is an Indian singer, actress, dancer, and television host. She was a contestant on Zee TV's Sa Re Ga Ma Pa Challenge 2007. She was also a finalist in Sony Entertainment's Chalo America Boogie Woogie in 2004, and was crowned Miss Teen India Texas 2007. Mauli then decided to move to Mumbai at the age of 19 to pursue a career in music and acting. She hosted a family dance show on the Zee Network titled "Rock n Roll Family" in 2008, lead role in a Zoom Tele-Film "Ek Anhonee", participated in Fear Factor India: Khatron Ke Khiladi season 4 and emerged as the Runner-up. She is from Gujarat.

She was seen in one episode of the Zee TV serial, Parrivaar.

== Sa Re Ga Ma Pa Challenge 2007 ==
When Saregamapa, a popular music reality show in India, announced to have auditions internationally in countries like America, Canada, UK, South Africa, U.A.E. and Pakistan; Mauli decided to audition to represent the USA. She went through five to six rounds of auditions in the US and later in Mumbai. She was finally chosen the one to represent the US after her famous rendition of the song "Mayya Mayya." Mauli was mentored by Bappi Lahiri. She eventually reached the top 10.

== Discography ==
Year	Movie/Album	Song title	Composer	Co-singer	Awards/Nominations
2006	Prabhu Tare Pagathiye (Album)	All Tracks	Omkar Dave	Hemant Dave and Omkar Dave	none
2007	To Kya Ho (Album)	Kaisi Ye Deewangi(reprised), Dil Dhadakne Laga	Mitul and Mukul	Mukul	none
2008	Bal Ganesh (Film)	Gana Ganadi	Shamir Tandon	Sumedha Karmahe, Junaid Sheikh	none
2008	Mittal v/s Mittal (Film)	Khuda Hafiz	Shamir Tandon	solo	none
2009	Love Ka Tadka (Film)	Title track	Aadesh Shrivastava	Aadesh Shrivastava	Nomination at Music Mirchi Awards "Upcoming Debutante Female"
2010	Fasttrack (Product Ad)	"I Like It Shady"	Mikey McCleary	solo	none
2010	DelMonte (Product Ad)	"You Ain't Had Nothin Like This"	Mikey McCleary	Bob	none
2011	The Bartender: Classic Bollywood Shaken not Stirred (Album)	Chalte Chalte, Ye Sama, Jaane Kya Tune Kahi, Waqt Ne Kiya	Mikey McCleary	Solo Tracks	none
2011	Players (Film)	Title track	Pritam	Neeraj Sridhar	none
2013	I Love New Year (Film)	Aja Meri Jaan	Pritam	Solo	none
2014	Khoobsurat (Film)	Maa Ka Phone	Sneha Khanwalkar	Priya Saraiya	none

== Television ==
Year	Show	Role	Channel	Extra
2004	Boogie Woogie-Chalo America	Contestant	SET (Sony Entertainment Television)	Finalist (Top 5)
2007	Sa Re Ga Ma Pa Challenge 2007	Contestant	Zee Network	Finalist (Top 7)
2008	Rock-N-Roll Family	Host	Zee Network	
2010	Ek Anhonee	Divyani	Zoom	
2011	Fear Factor: Khatron Ke Khiladi 4	Contestant	Colors	Finalist (Top 2)
2012	Kahani Comedy Circus Ki	Contestant	SET (Sony Entertainment Television)	
2013	Welcome - Baazi Mehmaan-Nawaazi ki	Contestant	Life OK	

== Awards and nominations ==
- Crowned "Miss Teen India Texas 2007"
- Stardust Awards 2009–2010: Nominated for "Upcoming Debutant Singer" for the song "Agre Ka Ghaghra" from the film "Jai Veeru”
- Music Mirchi Awards 2009–2010: Nominated for "Upcoming Singer Female" for the title song of "Love Ka Tadka.”
- Gujarati Garvvati Awards 2010: Won award for "Upcoming Singer”
