= Aneek Dhar =

Indian singer and composer

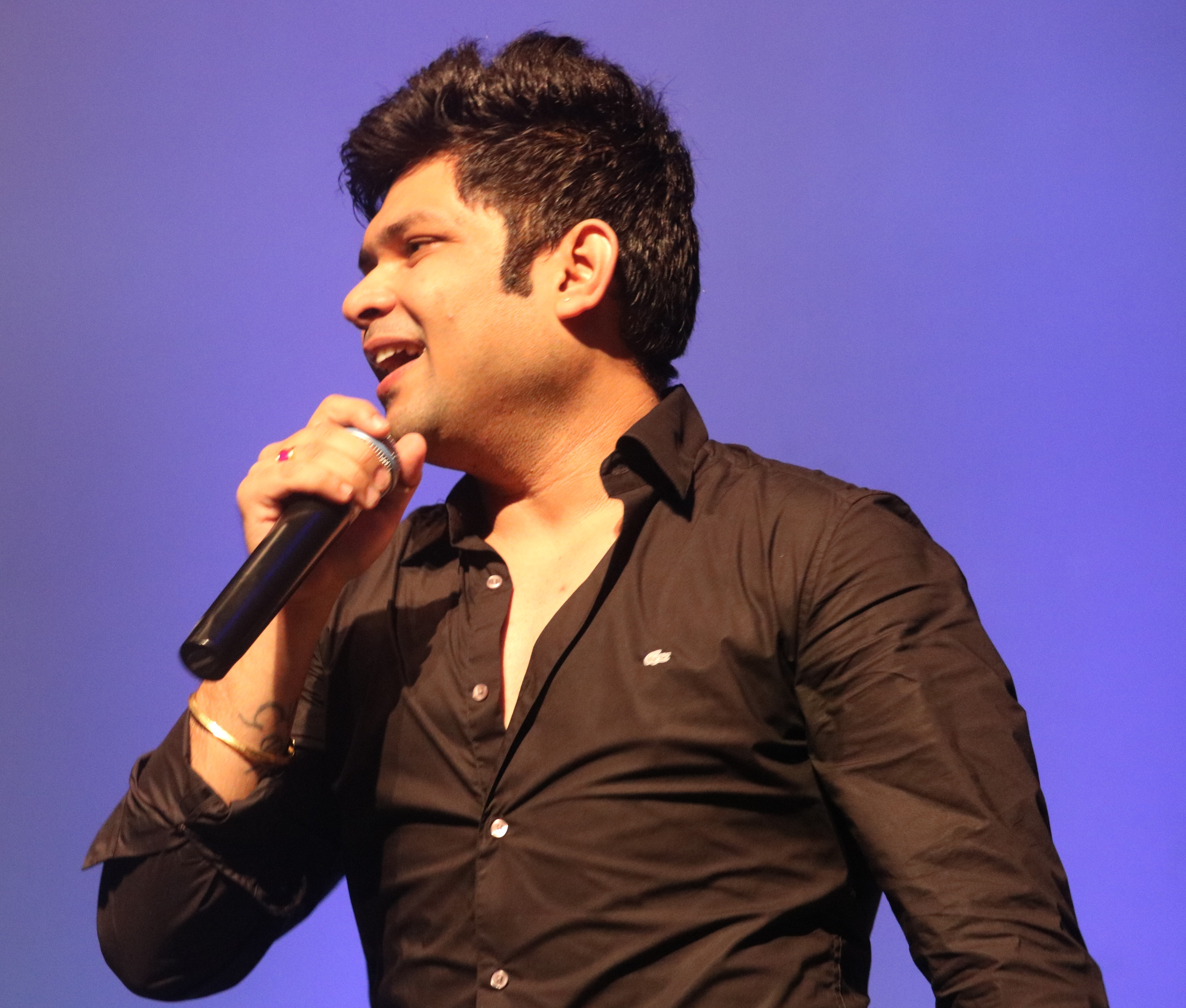
- Dhar performing in Toronto, Canada, May 2018

Background information
- Born: Aneek Dhar; 26 April 1990 (age 36)
- Origin: Kolkata, West Bengal, India
- Genres: Indian; filmi; classical; pop; rock; western
- Occupations: Singer, composer, live performer
- Instrument: Vocals; piano; keyboard; harmonium
- Years active: 2007–present
- Website: http://www.aneekdhar.in

Aneek Dhar (born 26 April 1990 in Kolkata) is an Indian Playback Singer, Music Composer and Live Performer who started his professional musical career at the age of 17 by winning Zee TV Sa Re Ga Ma Pa Challenge 2007 and Sa Re Ga Ma Pa Bangla both in the same year. He also was the winner of Bigg Boss Bangla Season 1 (Colors Bangla). Dhar has been performing live with his band since then in India as well as abroad. In 2018, Dhar started his career as a music composer mainly for his music videos (singles), web series and films. In 2023 Aneek Dhar composed music for full-length Bengali feature films Like: Chengiz, Manush: Child of Destiny, Mirza: Part 1 – Joker, Archie’r Gallery etc. For the film Chengiz and Manush: Child of Destiny Aneek composed songs both in Bengali and Hindi versions. Along with music composition, In 2024 Aneek sang the Title Track (Hey Shastri) of the Mithun Chakraborty starrer Bengali film Shastri under the music direction of Indraadip Dasgupta.

== Education ==
Dhar was educated at the Nava Nalanda High School where he won the Nalanda Ratna award in 2009.

== Career ==
After winning Zee TV Sa Re Ga Ma Pa Challenge 2007 Aneek Dhar's first solo album, "Khwaishein" was released in 2008. "Khwaishein" Won Kalakar Awards in the Best Music Album category.

In 2008 Aneek participated in Zee TV's show Ek Se Badhkar Ek, and was an anchor for Zee Bangla Sa Re Ga Ma Pa. In 2011, he was a host for the show Zee Bangla Sa Re Ga Ma Pa Li'l Champs 2011. In 2012 he participated in the shows "Jo Jeeta Wohi Superstar −2" and Music Ka Maha Muqqabla on Star Plus, and he won the Bengali edition of the first season of Bigg Boss. He also hosted the game show Parar Shera Bouthan on Colors Bangla.

Aneek Dhar has been actively performing live with his band in India and internationally. In 2018, he began his career as a music composer, primarily working on music videos, web series, and films. In 2023, Dhar composed music for several full-length Bengali feature films, including Chengiz, Manush: Child of Destiny, Mirza: Part 1 - Joker, and Archie’r Gallery. For Chengiz and Manush: Child of Destiny, he composed songs in both Bengali and Hindi versions. In 2024 Aneek sang the Title Track (Hey Shastri) of the Mithun Chakraborty starrer Bengali film Shastri under the music direction of Indraadip Dasgupta.

== Music Composition ==
Year	Film name	Language	Music composer	Songs Composed	Sung By	Lyrics By	Production House
2023	Chengiz	Bengali	Aneek Dhar	Widda (Bengali)	Divya Kumar	Pranjal Das	Jeetz Filmworks
2023	Chengiz	Hindi	Aneek Dhar	Widda (Hindi)	Divya Kumar	Panchhi Jalonvi	Jeetz Filmworks
2023	Chengiz	Bengali	Aneek Dhar	Ragada (Bengali)	Mika Singh	Pranjal Das	Jeetz Filmworks
2023	Chengiz	Hindi	Aneek Dhar	Ragada (Hindi)	Mika Singh	Shabbir Ahmed	Jeetz Filmworks
2023	Manush: Child of Destiny	Bengali	Aneek Dhar	Aay Bristi (Bengali)	Shreya Ghosal, Abhay Jodhpurkar	Rivo, Pranjal	Jeetz Filmworks
2023	Manush: Child of Destiny	Hindi	Aneek Dhar	Barse Re (Hindi)	Shreya Ghosal, Abhay Jodhpurkar	Panchhi Jalonvi	Jeetz Filmworks
2023	Archie’r Gallery	Bengali	Aneek Dhar	Moner Moto	Dipaayan Banerjee	Nilanjan Chakraborty	Shyamsundar Dey
2023	Archier Gallery	Bengali	Aneek Dhar	Preme Pora Jaak	Aneek Dhar, Sanchita Bhattacharya	Nilanjan Chakraborty	Shyamsundar Dey
2023	Archier Gallery	Bengali	Aneek Dhar	Kachhe Thaak	Snigdhajit Bhowmik, Suchandra Bhattacharya	Nilanjan Chakraborty	Shyamsundar Dey
2024	Mirza: Part 1 - Joker	Bengali	Aneek Dhar	Elo Mirza	Amit Mishra, Aneek Dhar	Pranjal Das	Ankush Hazra Motion Pictures
2024	The Birthday Gift	Hindi	Aneek Dhar	Jaane Tu Kahaan Hai	Aneek Dhar, Sumedha Karmahe	Aneek Dhar, Sourav Malakar	Bio Cine Media Entertainment PVT LTD

== Television Reality Shows ==
Year	Show Name	Language	TV Channel Name	Result
2007	Zee Bangla Sa Re Ga Ma Pa Bangla	Bengali	Zee Bangla	Won
2007	Zee TV Sa Re Ga Ma Pa Challenge 2007	Hindi	Zee TV	Won
2008	Ek Se Badhkar Ek	Hindi	Zee TV	Finalist
2009	Music Ka Maha Muqqabla	Hindi	StarPlus	Finalist
2012	Jo Jeeta Wohi Super Star 2	Hindi	StarPlus	Finalist
2013	Bigg Boss Bangla Season 1	Bengali	ETV Bangla (Now Colors Bangla)	Won
2022	Ishmart Jodi Season 1	Bengali	Star Jalsha	Finalist (with his wife)

== Career as Television Show Host ==
Year	Show Name	Language	Television Channel	Role
2008	Zee Bangla Sa Re Ga Ma Pa Vishwa Sera 2008	Bengali	Zee Bangla	Host
2008	Zee Bangla Sa Re Ga Ma Pa (Only for Blind participants)	Bengali	Zee Bangla	
2011	Zee Bangla Sa Re Ga Ma Pa Lil Champs	Bengali	Zee Bangla	Host
2014	Parar Sera Bouthan	Bengali	ETV Bangla (Now Colors Bangla)	Host
2025	Sonar Jalshaghar	Bengali	Zee Bangla Sonar	Host

== Career as Grand Jury ==
Year	Show Name	Language	TV Channel Name	Role
2017	Sa Re Ga Ma Pa Li'l Champs 2017	Hindi	Zee TV	Jury Member
2019	Sa Re Ga Ma Pa Li'l Champs 2019	Hindi	Zee TV	Jury Member
2020	Sa Re Ga Ma Pa Li'l Champs 2020	Hindi	Zee TV	Jury Member

== Music albums ==
Year	Album name	Language	Record label	Album Type
2008	Khwaishein	Hindi	Universal Music India	Pop
2008	Agnee	Assamese	AB Production	Pop
2007	Manzil	Hindi	Zee TV	Pop
2011	Khushir Chhonya	Bengali	Saregama Music	Classical
2012	Porichoy	Bengali	Saregama Music	Rabindra Sangeet

== Singles ==
Year	Song name	Language	Music director	Singers	Record label
2014	Yeh Dil Na Hota (Cover)	Hindi	S.D.Burman	Aneek Dhar	Dj Akash Rohira
2016	Uljha Raha (Aatish)	Hindi	Indraadip Dasgupta	Aneek Dhar	Shree Venkatesh Films; SVF Music
2017	Jeene Ki Azaadi	Hindi	Shubham Ganguly	Aneek Dhar	DBS Music
2018	Tu Hi Hai Pyaar	Hindi	Aneek Dhar	Aneek Dhar	Aneek Dhar
2018	Majhe Majhe Tobo Dekha Pai	Bengali	Rabindranath Tagore	Aneek Dhar	Aneek Dhar
2018	Ehsaan Tera (Cover)	Hindi	Shankar-Jaikishan	Aneek Dhar	Saregama
2019	Sajna	Bengali	Aneek Dhar	Aneek Dhar	Griebs Music Bangla
2019	Vande Mataram	Hindi	Rahul Bhatt	Aneek Dhar	Zee Music Company
2021	Joy Maa Durga	Bengali	Aneek Dhar	Aneek Dhar	BiiggBang
2021	Jai Maa Durge	Hindi	Aneek Dhar	Aneek Dhar	Biiggbang
2021	Sovan-Baishakhi	Bengali	Aneek Dhar	Aneek Dhar	Aneek Dhar
2021`	Dholidaa Dhol Bajaa	Hindi	Sangeeta Pant	Aneek Dhar, Sangeeta Pant	Times Music Spiritual
2025	Dil Tujhe Haare	Hindi	Aneek Dhar	Javed Ali, Antara Nandy	Times Music

== Film Playbacks ==
Year	Movie name	Song name	Co-singer(s)	Language
2024	Shastri	Hey Shastri		Bengali
2007	Bal Ganesh	Teeno Lok Me Pooja Jaye	Asha Bhosle, Amaanat	Hindi
2008	Tomar Jonyo			Bengali
2009	Kolir Arjun			Bengali
2010	Nayika			Bengali
2010	Krishna			Bengali
2010	Handa and Bhonda	Hey Baby Lets Go Crazy		Bengali
2010	Kichhu Chaoa Kichhu Paoa			Bengali
2010	Love Connection			Bengali
2011	Superstar			Bengali
2011	Mon Bole Priya Priya	Tumi Ele Jibone, Ei Je Mati Ei Je Akash, Mon Bole Priya Priya, Mon Bole Priya Priya (Sad)		Bengali
2011	Unish Kurir Galpo			Bengali
2011	Ami Achhi Sei Je Tomar			Bengali
2011	Shomoy			Bengali
2011	Rang Milanti			Bengali
2011	Warrant - The Mission	Raatdin	Anwesha Dutta Gupta	Bengali
2011	Warrant - The Mission	Saathiya	Nilakshi Bhattacharya	Bengali
2012	Classmate	Disa Hara E Mon		Bengali
2012	Classmate	Saiyan Re	Nilakshi Bhattacharya	Bengali
2012	Jaal			Bengali
2012	Keno Mon Take Chai	Keno Mon Take Chai	Somchandra	Bengali
2012	Keno Mon Take Chai	Kelo Kelo	Chorus	Bengali
2012	Keno Mon Take Chai	Dhinak Dhin	Somchandra	Bengali

== Personal life ==
Aneek Dhar married long-time girlfriend Debaleena in December 2014. Aneek and Debaleena blessed with their baby girl Aadya in 2018. Aneek Dhar's second child is a baby boy, named Adban, who was born in 2023.

== Philanthropy ==
in 2021 Aneek Dhar launched an initiative to provide nutritious meals to COVID-positive individuals, particularly those in home isolation who are unable to cook due to various difficulties.
