= 143 (2022 film) =

- Promotional release poster
- Directed by: Yogesh Pandurang Bhonsale
- Written by: Dr. Bhalchandra Gaikwad
- Produced by: Veerkumar Shaha
- Starring: Yogesh Bhosale; Shital Ahirrao; Vrushabh Shah; Shashank Shende; Suresh Vishwakarma
- Cinematography: Vikas Singh
- Edited by: S. Vikraman
- Music by: P. Shankaram
- Production company: Sharada Films Production
- Distributed by: AA Films
- Release date: 4 March 2022
- Running time: 130 minutes
- Country: India
- Language: Marathi

143 (subtitled onscreen with He Aapla Kalij Hayy !; transl. This is our heart !) is a 2022 Indian Marathi-language romantic tragedy film directed by Yogesh Pandurang Bhosale and produced under the banner of Sharda Films Production. The story, screenplay and dialogues of this film were written by Dr. Bhalchandra Gaikwad. It stars Yogesh Bhosale, Shital Ahirrao, Vrushabh Shah, Shashank Shende, Suresh Vishwakarma in the lead roles.

== Cast ==
- Yogesh Bhosale as Vishu
- Shital Ahirrao as Madhu
- Shashank Shende as Vishu's father
- Suresh Vishwakarma as Birasdar
- Vrushabh Shah as Ananta

== Release ==
The film was released theatrically nationwide on 4 March 2022.

== Soundtrack ==
143

Soundtrack album by P. Shankaram
- Released: 2022
- Genre: Feature film soundtrack
- Length: 20:08
- Language: Marathi
- Label: Zee Music Company

Official audio
- 143 - Full Album on YouTube

Track listing
No.	Title	Length
1.	"Padla Khatla"	4:46
2.	"Dhingana Crowd"	3:26
3.	"Bharli Ura Madhi"	4:57
4.	"Vachu De Ishkacha Praan"	7:08
Total length:		20:08
