= Archier Gallery =

2023 Indian Bengali film

- Digital release poster
- Directed by: Promita Bhattacharya
- Written by: Arnab Bhaumik
- Produced by: Shyamsundar Dey
- Starring: Rajatabha Dutta; Bonny Sengupta; Ayoshi Talukdar
- Edited by: Subhajit Singha
- Music by: Aneek Dhar
- Distributed by: ZEE5
- Release date: 10 March 2023
- Country: India
- Language: Bengali

Archier Gallery is a Bengali romantic comedy film directed by Promita Bhattacharya and produced by Shyamsundar Dey. It features Bonny Sengupta, Rajatabha Dutta, Abhijit Guha, and Sudeshna Roy in the lead roles. The film had its theatrical release on 10 March 2023, followed by its digital release on 7 July 2023.

== Plot ==
Archier Gallery tells the story of Archie, portrayed by Bonny Sengupta, a young man who grew up without his mother and was raised by his father and aunt. Archie becomes heavily reliant on his father, played by Rajatabha Dutta, who acts as his primary support system. The film is set in the modern world but captures the nostalgic essence of the 90s. Archie longs for a time before cell phones and is deeply attached to that era. His father's love story with his mother serves as a constant reminder of that time. Niharika, played by Ayoshi Talukdar, enters Archie's life, and with his father's guidance, he embarks on a journey of love and self-discovery.

== Cast ==
Cast	Character
Bonny Sengupta	Archie
Ayoshi Talukdar	Niharika
Rajatabha Dutta	Archie's father
Abhijit Guha	
Sudeshna Roy	

== Production ==
Archier Gallery marks the third collaboration between Ayoshi Talukdar and Bonny Sengupta, who previously appeared together in the films Amrapali directed by Raja Chanda and Hirakgorer Hire directed by Sayantan Ghosal. The film is directed by Pramita Bhattacharya, a debutant director and a graduate of the Film and Television Institute of India (FTII). Shyamsundar Dey serves as the producer of the film under the banner of Shadow Films. The music for ''Archie'r Gallery'' is composed by Aneek Dhar.

== Release and reception ==
Archier Gallery had its theatrical release on 10 March 2023, garnering attention for its nostalgic storytelling and the chemistry between the lead actors, Bonny Sengupta and Ayoshi Talukdar. The film premiered at INOX South City in the presence of the cast and crew. The digital rights of the film were acquired by ZEE5 and It will be released on the platform on 7 July 2023. The film's trailer was released on 20 January 2023. The shooting took place in various locations in Kolkata.
