= Bigg Boss Bangla season 2 =

Second season of Bigg Boss Bangla

Bigg Boss Bangla
- Season 2
- Season's logo with host Jeet
- Presented by: Jeet
- No. of days: 98
- No. of housemates: 15
- Winner: Joyjit Banerjee
- Runner-up: Priya Paul

Release
- Original network: Colors Bangla
- Original release: 4 April – 15 July 2016

Season chronology
- ← Previous; Season 1 Next → Season 3

Bigg Boss Bangla Season 2, also known as Bigg Boss: Byata Dumukho, was the second season of the Bengali version of the Indian reality show Bigg Boss. Hosted by Jeet, the season premiered on Colors Bangla on 4 April 2016. The Grand Finale aired on 15 July 2016 where Joyjit Banerjee emerged as the winner and Priya Paul emerged as the runner-up.

== Housemates status ==
Sr	Housemate	Day entered	Day exited	Status
01	Joyjit	Day 1	Day 98	Winner
02	Priya	Day 1	Day 98	1st Runner-up
03	Rii	Day 1	Day 98	2nd Runner-up
04	Shilajit	Day 1	Day 98	3rd Runner-up
05	Apurba	Day 1	Day 91	Evicted
06	Sandy	Day 1	Day 14	Evicted
06	Sandy	Day 35	Day 84	Evicted
07	Priti	Day 1	Day 77	Evicted
08	Komolika	Day 1	Day 28	Evicted
08	Komolika	Day 56	Say 70	Evicted
09	Mekhail	Day 1	Day 62	Evicted
10	Debolina	Day 35	Day 56	Evicted
11	Joey	Day 28	Day 46	Ejected
12	Aditi	Day 1	Day 42	Evicted
13	Ena	Day 3	Day 35	Evicted
14	Mainak	Day 1	Day 21	Evicted
15	Aviral	Day 1	Day 11	Walked
16	Srabanti	Day 1	Day 7	Evicted

== Housemates ==
The list of contestants in the order of entering the house:

=== Original entrants ===
- Shilajit Majumder – Singer.
- Mekhail Bora – Chef (Brother of Sheena Bora).
- Apurbo Roy – Comedian.
- Joyjit Banerjee – Television actor.
- Mainak Banerjee – Actor.
- Kamalika Banerjee – Actress.
- Rii Sen – Actress.
- Priya Paul – Actress.
- Srabanti Banerjee – Actress.
- Aditi Chakraborty – Choreographer.
- Prity Biswas – Television actress.
- Sandip Rong – Choreographer.
- Aviral Sachdev - Actor, model and reality television personality known for MTV Roadies 12

=== Wild card entrants ===
- Debolina Dutta - Actress
- Ena Saha - Actress
- Joey Debroy - Television Actor

=== Guest Entrant ===
- Puja Banerjee – Television actress.

== Nominations table ==
	Week 1	Week 2	Week 3	Week 4	Week 5	Week 6	Week 7	Week 8	Week 9	Week 10	Week 11	Week 12	Week 13	Week 14		
House; Captain	Shilajit	Mekhail	Aditi	Rituparna	Apurba	Joey	Priya	Sandy		Joyjit		Apurba		No Captain		
Captain's Nomination	Aviral	Sandy	Priya	Mekhail	Rituparna	Priya	Mekhail	Priti	Mekhail	Apurba	Sandy	Sandy	Priya	No Captain		
Vote to:	Evict							Save	Evict							
Joyjit	Mainak; Srabanti	Aviral; Priya	Rituparna; Priti	Komolika; Aditi	Priya; Priti	Apurba; Aditi	Rituparna; Sandy	Mekhail; Apurba	Rituparna; Priya	House; Captain		Priya; Sandy	Rituparna; Sandy	Nominated	Winner (Day 98)	
Priya	Mainak; Srabanti	Aditi; Priti	Apurba; Priti	Apurba; Priti	Shilajit; Ena	Aditi; Shilajit	House; Captain	Rituparna; Mekhail	Apurba; Rituparna	Rituparna; Komolika	Rituparna; Apurba	Joyjit; Rituparna	Joyjit; Shiljit	Nominated	1st runner-up (Day 98)	
Shilajit	House; Captain	Komolika; Aviral	Rituparna; Komolika	Komolika; Priti	Priya; Priti	Priti; Priya	Sandy; Rituparna	Mekhail; Apurba	Secret; Room	Sandy; Priti	Apurba; Rituparna	Sandy; Rituparna	Rituparna; Priya	Nominated	2nd runner-up (Day 98)	
Rituparna	Joyjit; Apurba	Aviral; Priya	Priti; Apurba	House; Captain	Shilajit; Ena	Apurba; Joyjit	Joyjit; Joey	Priya; Priti	Priya; Priti	Sandy; Priti	Priya; Priti	Sandy; Priya	Joyjit; Sandy	Nominated	3rd Runner-up (Day 98)	
Apurba	Rituparna; Priti	Priya; Priti	Rituparna; Priti	Priti; Komolika	House; Captain	Aditi; Shilajit	Priti; Joey	Mekhail; Rituparna	Priti; Joyjit	Rituparna; Komolika	Shilajit; Priti	House; Captain		Nominated	Evicted (Day 95)	
Sandy	Mainak; Rituparna	Shilajit; Aviral	Evicted (Day 14)			Mekhail; Shilajit	Joyjit; Mekhail	House; Captain		Rituparna; Komolika	Rituparna; Priti	Joyjit; Rituparna	Joyjit; Rituparna	Evicted (Day 91)		
Priti	Srabanti; Priya	Aviral; Priya	Komolika; Rituparna	Apurba; Ena	Shilajit; Ena	Aditi; Shilajit	Joyjit; Apurba	Priya; Rituparna	Apurba; Joyjit	Rituparna; Komolika	Rituparna; Apruba	Evicted (Day 77)				
Komolika	Priya; Joyjit	Shilajit; Aviral	Priti; Apurba	Joyjit; Apurba	Evicted (Day 28)				Apurba; Priti	Priti; Sandy	Evicted (Day 70)					
Mekhail	Apurba; Sandy	House; Captain	Rituparna; Komolika	Komolika; Aditi	Priya; Priti	Apurba; Shilajit	Priti; Sandy	Shilajit; Apurba	Priti; Priya	Evicted (Day 62)						
Debolina	Not In House					Apurba; Shilajit	Rituparna; Sandy	Mekhail; Shilajit	Evicted (Day 56)							
Joey	Not In House				Ena; Aditi	House; Captain	Rituparna; Apurba	Ejected (Day 46)								
Aditi	Mainak; Joyjit	Priya; Shilajit	House; Captain	Ena; Joyjit	Ena; Shilajit	Joyjit; Apurba	Evicted (Day 42)									
Ena	Not In House	Aviral; Priya	Komolika; Rituparna	Priti; Aditi	Priti; Priya	Evicted (Day 35)										
Mainak	Aditi; Sandy	Aviral; Priya	Apurba; Priti	Evicted (Day 21)												
Aviral	Joyjit; Rituparna	Priya; Mainak	Walked (Day 11)													
Srabanti	Mikhail; Apurba	Evicted (Day 7)														
Notes	none	1														
Against Public Vote	Apurba; Aviral; Joyjit; Mainak; Rituparna; Srabanti	~~Aviral~~; Ena; Priya; Sandy; Shilajit	Joyjit; Mainak; Mekhail; Priya; Priti; Rituparna; Shilajit	Aditi; Apurba; Komolika; Mekhail; Priti; Priya	Ena; Priti; Priya; Rituparna; Shilajit	Aditi; Apurba; Joyjit; Priya; Shilajit	Apurba; Joey; Joyjit; Mekhail; Priti; Rituparna; Sandy	Debolina; Joyjit; ~~Priti~~; Priya; Shilajit	Apurba; Mikhail; Priti; Priya	Komolika; Priti; Rituparna; Sandy	Apurba; Priti; Rituparna; Shilajit	Joyjit; Priya; Rituparna; ~~Sandy~~; Shilajit	Joyjit; Priya; Rituparna; Sandy	Apurba; Joyjit; Priya; Rituparna; Shilajit	Joyjit; Priya; Rituparna; Shilajit	
Re-entered	None					Sandy	None		Komolika	None						
Secret Room	None								Shilajit	None						
Walked	None	Aviral	None													
Ejected	None						Joey	None								
Evicted	Srabanti	Sandy	Mainak	Komolika	Ena	Aditi	No; Evictiom	Debolina	Mekhail	Komolika	Priti	No; Eviction	Sandy	Apurba	Rituparna	Shilajit
Evicted	Srabanti	Sandy	Mainak	Komolika	Ena	Aditi	No; Evictiom	Debolina	Mekhail	Komolika	Priti	No; Eviction	Sandy	Apurba	Priya	Joyjit

indicates that the Housemate was directly nominated for eviction.
indicates that the Housemate was immune prior to nominations.
indicates the contestant has been evicted.
indicates the contestant walked out due to emergency.
indicates the contestant has been ejected.
indicates the house captain.

=== Nomination notes ===
- ^Note 1: Ena was nominated by Bigg Boss after failing the secret task given to her when she entered on Day 3 as the first wild card entrant.
