= AA Films =

Indian film distribution company

- Type: Private limited company
- Industry: Film and entertainment
- Founded: 1993 in Mumbai, India
- Founder: Anil Thadani
- Headquarters: Mumbai, India
- Area served: Worldwide
- Key people: Anil Thadani; Raveena Tandon; Rohit Khattar
- Services: Film distribution
- Owner: Anil Thadani
- Subsidiaries: Cinestaan AA Distributors
- Website: aafilms.co.in

AA Films is an Indian motion picture distribution company, owned by Anil Thadani and Raveena Tandon. It mainly distributes Hindi films and Hindi-dubbed films.

== Background ==
AA Films was founded by Anil Thadani in 1993. It independently distributes films in India. The company entered on a joint venture with Cineestan Film Company; the JV is named "Cineestan AA Distributors". Anil Thadani is managing director and CEO of the JV. Rohit Khattar, founder chairman of Cinestaan, is chairman of the JV.

== Films distributed ==
Key
†	Denotes films that have not yet been released

Year	Film	Language	Notes	Ref.
2025	Ramayana: The Legend of Prince Rama	Hindi	Distributed along with Excel Entertainment and Geek Pictures	
1994	Yeh Dillagi	Hindi		
1995	Dilwale Dulhania Le Jayenge	Hindi		
2000	Mela	Hindi		
2001	Tum Bin	Hindi		
2001	Dil Chahta Hai	Hindi		
2003	Stumped	Hindi		
2003	Chalte Chalte	Hindi		
2003	Munna Bhai MBBS	Hindi		
2004	Lakshya	Hindi	Re-release only	
2004	Rakht	Hindi		
2005	Black	Hindi		
2005	Pehchaan	Hindi		
2006	Golmaal: Fun Unlimited	Hindi		
2006	Don	Hindi		
2010	Karthik Calling Karthik	Hindi		
2011	The Dirty Picture	Hindi		
2012	Agneepath	Hindi		
2012	Student of the Year	Hindi		
2013	Jackpot	Hindi		
2013	Aashiqui 2	Hindi		
2013	Fukrey	Hindi		
2013	Issaq	Hindi		
2013	Gori Tere Pyaar Mein!	Hindi		
2014	Creature 3D	Hindi		
2014	Yaariyan	Hindi		
2014	Hasee Toh Phasee	Hindi		
2014	O Teri	Hindi		
2014	Roar: Tigers of the Sundarbans	Hindi		
2014	Children of War	Hindi		
2014	The Xposé	Hindi		
2014	Humpty Sharma Ki Dulhania	Hindi		
2014	Bhoothnath Returns	Hindi		
2014	Hate Story 2	Hindi		
2014	Ek Villain	Hindi		
2014	Ungli	Hindi		
2014	The Shaukeens	Hindi		
2015	I	Hindi (dubbed)	Dubbed version of Tamil film	
2015	Roy	Hindi		
2015	Ek Paheli Leela	Hindi		
2015	Baahubali: The Beginning	Hindi (dubbed)	Distributed along with Dharma Productions; Dubbed version of Telugu film	
2015	Dil Dhadakne Do	Hindi		
2015	Bangistan	Hindi		
2015	Welcome 2 Karachi	Hindi		
2015	Bhaag Johnny	Hindi		
2015	Talvar	Hindi		
2015	Hate Story 3	Hindi		
2015	Masaan	Hindi		
2016	Kaik Karne Yaar	Gujarati		
2016	Zorawar	Punjabi		
2016	Love Games	Hindi		
2016	Veerappan	Hindi		
2016	Mirzya	Hindi		
2016	Tum Bin 2	Hindi		
2016	Wajah Tum Ho	Hindi		
2017	The Ghazi Attack	Hindi		
2017	Noor	Hindi		
2017	Maatr	Hindi		
2017	Baahubali 2: The Conclusion	Hindi (dubbed)	Distributed along with Dharma Productions; Dubbed version of Telugu film	
2017	Hindi Medium	Hindi		
2017	Sachin: A Billion Dreams	Hindi	Trilingual film	
2017	Sachin: A Billion Dreams	Marathi	Trilingual film	
2017	Sachin: A Billion Dreams	English	Trilingual film	
2017	FU: Friendship Unlimited	Marathi		
2017	Hrudayantar	Marathi		
2017	Behen Hogi Teri	Hindi		
2017	Raabta	Hindi		
2017	Bareilly Ki Barfi	Hindi		
2017	Babumoshai Bandookbaaz	Hindi		
2017	Haseena Parkar	Hindi		
2017	Chef	Hindi		
2017	Spyder	Tamil; Telugu	Only North India release	
2017	Ittefaq	Hindi		
2017	Tumhari Sulu	Hindi		
2017	Firangi	Hindi		
2017	Fukrey Returns	Hindi		
2018	Hostel Days	Marathi		
2018	Kaalakaandi	Hindi		
2018	Vodka Diaries	Hindi		
2018	Sonu Ke Titu Ki Sweety	Hindi		
2018	Hate Story 4	Hindi		
2018	3 Storeys	Hindi		
2018	Raazi	Hindi		
2018	Bucket List	Marathi		
2018	Phamous	Hindi		
2018	Kaala	Hindi (dubbed)	Distributed along with Lyca Productions; Dubbed version of Tamil film	
2018	Nawabzaade	Hindi		
2018	Chumbak	Marathi		
2018	Reva	Gujarati		
2018	Fanney Khan	Hindi		
2018	Gold	Hindi		
2018	Stree	Hindi		
2018	Badhaai Ho	Hindi		
2018	Mulshi Pattern	Marathi		
2018	Madhuri	Marathi		
2018	Mauli	Marathi		
2018	2.0	Hindi (dubbed)	Distributed along with Dharma Productions; Dubbed version of Tamil film	
2018	K.G.F: Chapter 1	Hindi (dubbed)	Distributed along with Excel Entertainment Dubbed version of Kannada film	
2019	Ek Nirnay	Marathi		
2019	Sarva Line Vyasta Ahet	Marathi		
2019	Why Cheat India	Hindi		
2019	Amavas	Hindi		
2019	Ashi Hi Aashiqui	Hindi		
2019	Gully Boy	Hindi		
2019	Luka Chuppi	Hindi		
2019	Badla	Hindi		
2019	Photograph	Hindi		
2019	Photograph	English		
2019	Junglee	Hindi		
2019	De De Pyaar De	Hindi		
2019	Bharat	Hindi		
2019	Kabir Singh	Hindi		
2019	Arjun Patiala	Hindi		
2019	Girlfriend	Marathi		
2019	Batla House	Hindi		
2019	Saaho	Hindi		
2019	Sye Raa Narasimha Reddy	Hindi (dubbed)	Distributed along with Excel Entertainment; Dubbed version of Telugu film	
2019	Daaka	Punjabi		
2019	Triple Seat	Marathi		
2019	The Extraordinary Journey of the Fakir	Hindi		
2019	The Extraordinary Journey of the Fakir	English		
2019	Made in China	Hindi		
2019	Bala	Hindi		
2019	Fatteshikast	Marathi		
2019	Kulkarni Chaukatla Deshpande	Marathi		
2019	Pati Patni Aur Woh	Hindi		
2020	Tanhaji	Hindi		
2020	Man Fakira	Marathi		
2020	Street Dancer 3D	Hindi		
2020	Prawaas	Marathi		
2020	Shubh Mangal Zyada Saavdhan	Hindi		
2020	Thappad	Hindi		
2020	Indoo Ki Jawani	Hindi		
2021	Madam Chief Minister	Hindi		
2021	Kaanbhatt	Marathi		
2021	Tuesdays and Fridays	Hindi		
2021	Time to Dance	Hindi		
2021	Mumbai Saga	Hindi		
2021	Saina	Hindi		
2021	Koi Jaane Na	Hindi		
2021	Satyameva Jayate 2	Hindi		
2021	Chandigarh Kare Aashiqui	Hindi		
2021	Pushpa: The Rise	Hindi (dubbed)	Distributed along with Goldmines Telefilms; Dubbed version of Telugu film	
2022	Pawankhind	Marathi		
2022	Zombivli	Marathi		
2022	143	Marathi		
2022	Toolsidas Junior	Hindi		
2022	Radhe Shyam	Hindi		
2022	Bachchhan Paandey	Hindi		
2022	Vishu	Marathi		
2022	Hurdang	Hindi		
2022	K.G.F: Chapter 2	Hindi (dubbed)	Distributed along with Excel Entertainment; Dubbed version of Kannada film	
2022	Heropanti 2	Hindi		
2022	Bhool Bhulaiyaa 2	Hindi		
2022	Anek	Hindi		
2022	Sarsenapati Hambirrao	Marathi		
2022	Yare Yare Pavasa	Marathi		
2022	Aathva Rang Premacha	Marathi		
2022	Y	Marathi		
2022	Ek Villain Returns	Hindi		
2022	Daagadi Chawl 2	Marathi		
2022	Liger	Hindi; Telugu	Distributed in Tamil, Malayalam and Kannada apart from Hindi, Telugu	
2022	Roop Nagar Ke Cheetey	Marathi		
2022	Vendhu Thanindhathu Kaadu	Tamil	Only North India distribution	
2022	Dhokha: Round D Corner	Hindi		
2022	Shivpratap Garudjhep	Marathi		
2022	Nazar Andaaz	Hindi		
2022	Kantara	Hindi (dubbed)	Distributed along with Hombale Films; Dubbed version of Kannada film	
2022	The Ghost	Hindi (dubbed)	Distributed along with Goldmines Telefilms; Dubbed version of Telugu film	
2022	Thank God	Hindi		
2022	Honeymoon	Punjabi; Hindi		
2022	Phone Bhoot	Hindi		
2022	Double XL	Hindi		
2022	Tara vs Bilal	Hindi		
2022	An Action Hero	Hindi		
2022	Goshta Eka Paithanichi	Marathi		
2022	Connect	Hindi (dubbed)	Dubbed version of Tamil film	
2023	Varisu	Hindi (dubbed)	Dubbed version of Tamil film	
2023	Surya	Marathi		
2023	Sarla Ek Koti	Marathi		
2023	Tiger 24	English	Documentary	
2023	Faraaz	Hindi		
2023	Shehzada	Hindi		
2023	Jaggu Ani Juliet	Marathi		
2023	Bheed	Hindi		
2023	Operation Mayfair	Hindi		
2023	Dasara	Hindi (dubbed)	Dubbed version of Telugu film	
2023	Gurudev Hoysala	Kannada		
2023	Shaakuntalam	Hindi (dubbed)	Dubbed version of Telugu film	
2023	Circuitt	Marathi		
2023	Chengiz	Hindi (dubbed)	Dubbed version of Bengali film	
2023	Afwaah	Hindi		
2023	Jogira Sara Ra Ra	Hindi		
2023	Adipurush	Hindi	Distributed in Tamil & Malayalam apart from Hindi	
2023	Dhoomam	Hindi (dubbed)	Dubbed version of Malayalam film	
2023	Valatty	Hindi (dubbed)	Dubbed version of Malayalam film	
2023	Aflatoon	Marathi		
2023	Aani Baani	Marathi		
2023	Subhedar	Marathi		
2023	Fukrey 3	Hindi		
2023	Chandramukhi 2	Hindi (dubbed)	Dubbed version of Tamil film	
2023	Leo	Hindi (dubbed)	Dubbed version of Tamil film	
2023	Yaariyan 2	Hindi		
2023	The Lady Killer	Hindi		
2023	Starfish	Hindi		
2023	Animal	Hindi		
2023	Manush: Child of Destiny	Hindi (dubbed)	Dubbed version of Bengali film	
2023	Salaar	Hindi (dubbed)	Dubbed version of Telugu film	
2023	Kulkarni Chaukatla Deshpande	Marathi		
2024	Captain Miller	Hindi (dubbed)	Dubbed version of Tamil film	
2024	Hanu Man	Hindi (dubbed)	Dubbed version of Telugu film	
2024	Shivrayancha Chhava	Marathi		
2024	Dange	Hindi		
2024	Yodha	Hindi		
2024	UT69	Hindi		
2024	Madgaon Express	Hindi		
2024	Kuch Khattaa Ho Jaay	Hindi		
2024	The Goat Life	Hindi (dubbed)	Dubbed version of Malayalam film	
2024	Sridevi Prasanna	Marathi		
2024	Kanni	Marathi		
2024	Juna Furniture	Marathi		
2024	Do Aur Do Pyaar	Hindi		
2024	Srikanth	Hindi		
2024	Savi	Hindi		
2024	Kalki 2898 AD	Hindi (dubbed)	Dubbed version of Telugu film	
2024	Kill	Hindi		
2024	Raayan	Hindi (dubbed)	Dubbed version of Tamil film	
2024	Ghuspaithiya	Hindi		
2024	Yudhra	Hindi		
2024	Babu	Marathi	Original distributor	
2024	Kanguva	Hindi (dubbed)	Original distributor	
2024	Pushpa 2: The Rule	Hindi (dubbed)	Also United Kingdom distribution	
2024	Devara: Part 1	Hindi (dubbed)	Distributed along with Dharma Productions	
2024	ARM	Hindi (dubbed)	Dubbed version of Malayalam film	.
2024	Vicky Vidya Ka Woh Wala Video	Hindi		
2024	Bhool Bhulaiyaa 3	Hindi		
2025	Azaad	Hindi		
2025	Badass Ravi Kumar	Hindi		
2025	Dragon	Hindi (dubbed)		
2025	Jaat	Hindi	Distributed along with Zee Studios	
2025	Ground Zero	Hindi		
2025	Sant Dnyaneshwaranchi Muktai	Marathi		
2025	Raid 2	Hindi	Only international distribution	
2025	April May 99	Marathi		
2025	Saunkan Saunkanay 2	Punjabi		
2025	Sitaare Zameen Par	Hindi	Only international distribution	
2025	Metro... In Dino	Hindi		
2025	Tanvi the Great	Hindi	Distributed along with Excel Entertainment	
2025	Hari Hara Veera Mallu	Hindi (dubbed)	Dubbed version of Telugu film	
2025	Game Changer	Hindi (dubbed)	Dubbed version of Telugu film	
2025	Mahavatar Narsimha	Hindi; Kannada; Tamil; Telugu	Distributor of Hindi version	
2025	Kingdom	Hindi (dubbed)	Dubbed version of Telugu film	
2025	Kantara: Chapter 1	Hindi (dubbed)		
2025	Baahubali: The Epic	Hindi (dubbed)	Dubbed version of Telugu film	
2025	Gondhal	Marathi		
2025	Tere Ishk Mein	Hindi		
2026	The RajaSaab	Hindi (dubbed)	Dubbed version of Telugu film	
2026	Happy Patel: Khatarnak Jasoos	Hindi	Only International distribution	
2026	Border 2	Hindi		
2026	Happy Raj	Tamil	Only North India distribution	
2026	Kara	Hindi (dubbed)	Dubbed version of Tamil film	
2026	Ek Din	Hindi	Only International distribution	
2026	Krishnavataram Part 1: The Heart (Hridayam)	Hindi		
2026	Deool Band 2	Marathi		
2026	Ohh My Dog	Hindi		
2026	7 Dogs	Hindi (dubbed)	Dubbed version of Arabic film	
2026	Toxic	Hindi (dubbed)	Dubbed version of Kannada film	
2026	Mirzapur: The Movie	Hindi		
2026	Manjar	Marathi		
2026	The Paradise	Hindi (dubbed)	Dubbed version of Telugu film	
2026	Aali Mothi Shahani	Marathi		
2026	Ranabaali	Hindi (dubbed)	Dubbed version of Telugu film	
2026	418	Hindi (dubbed)	Dubbed version of Telugu film	
2026	Mookuthi Amman 2	Hindi (dubbed)	Dubbed version of Tamil film	
2026	Bandhu	Marathi		
2026	Maitreyaa	Marathi		
2026	Mysaa †	Hindi (dubbed)	Dubbed version of Telugu film	
2027	Fauzi †	Hindi (dubbed)	Dubbed version of Telugu film	

=== Film soundtracks released ===
Year	Film
2003	Stumped
2014	Roar: Tigers of the Sundarbans
2022	Kantara
2023	Chengiz
2023	Chandramukhi 2
2023	Manush: Child of Destiny
2026	Toxic

== Films presented ==
Year	Film	Original language	Note	Ref.
2015	Baahubali: The Beginning	Telugu	Presented along with Dharma Productions; Dubbed version	
2017	The Ghazi Attack	Telugu	Presented along with Dharma Productions; Dubbed version	
2017	Baahubali 2: The Conclusion	Telugu	Presented along with Dharma Productions; Dubbed version	
2018	Bucket List	Marathi	Presented along with Dharma Productions; Dubbed version	
2018	2.0	Tamil	Presented along with Dharma Productions; Dubbed version	
2018	K.G.F: Chapter 1	Kannada	Presented along with Excel Entertainment; Dubbed version	
2019	Sye Raa Narasimha Reddy	Telugu	Presented along with Excel Entertainment; Dubbed version	
2022	K.G.F: Chapter 2	Kannada	Presented along with Excel Entertainment; Dubbed version	
2022	Connect	Tamil		
2023	Chengiz	Bengali		
2023	Manush: Child of Destiny	Bengali		
2024	Devara: Part 1	Telugu	Presented along with Dharma Productions; Dubbed version	
