= Sa Re Ga Ma Pa Challenge 2007 =

- Season 2007
- Logo
- Starring: Ismail Darbar; Himesh Reshammiya; Bappi Lahiri; Vishal–Shekhar
- No. of episodes: 44

Release
- Original release: 4 May 2007 – October 13, 2007

Sa Re Ga Ma Pa Challenge 2007 is an Indian television singing competition that premiered on 4 May 2007 and ran until 13 October 2007. It is the 2nd instalment of the "Sa Re Ga Ma Pa Challenge" series and the 4th public voting competition in the "Sa Re Ga Ma Pa" series. Chronologically, the show is preceded by Sa Re Ga Ma Pa L'il Champs, however systematically it is followed by Sa Re Ga Ma Pa Challenge 2005. The show features two of the previous mentors, Himesh Reshammiya and Ismail Darbar, and two new mentors to the Challenge series, Bappi Lahiri and Vishal–Shekhar. Shaan did not return to host and was replaced by Aditya Narayan, son of playback singer, Udit Narayan.

The new logo is significantly different from the 2005 logo. It features headphones on a globe to represent itself as an international competition, instead of a previous logo consisting of a portrayal of a duet singing.

On 13 October at the Grand Finale, the show broke voting records with a collection of 10,61,44,354 (10.6 crores or 106 million) votes worldwide from 181 countries. In the final tally Aneek Dhar was declared the winner with 3,65,89,134 votes, Raja Hasan as the 1st runner-up with 3,52,40,963 votes and Amanat Ali as the 2nd runner-up with 3,43,14,257 votes.

== Gharana selection ==
The Gharana (literally "House") is utilised similarly to a House system used in schools and colleges. The contestants of the gharanas have been chosen by the mentors themselves.

Two of the four previous gharanas that were featured on Sa Re Ga Ma Pa Challenge 2005 have been replaced – Aadesh Shrivastava's Jai Ho and Jatin–Lalit's Dum have now been replaced with "Josh" and "Hit Squad". The following list represents the initial 32 contestants who were chosen by the mentors and in the order they were introduced.

=== Yalgaar – Ismail Darbar ===
- Rimi Dhar from Jabalpur, Madhya Pradesh, India -Eliminated on Episode 21: 13 July
- Jyoti Mishra from Azamgarh, Uttar Pradesh, India – Eliminated on Episode 14: 16 June
- Desh Gaurav Singh from Pratapgarh, Uttar Pradesh, India – Eliminated on Episode 6: 19 May
- Wasi Efandi from Karachi, Pakistan – Eliminated on Episode 15: 22 June
- Brijesh Shandilya from Basti, Uttar Pradesh, India – Eliminated on Episode 12: 9 June
- Poonam Yadav from Lucknow, Uttar Pradesh, India – 3rd runner-up. Eliminated on Episode 43: 28 September
- Amanat Ali from Faisalabad, Pakistan – Mega finalist and 2nd runner-up.

=== Jai Mata Di Let's Rock – Himesh Reshammiya ===
- Amrita Chatterjee from Kolkata, West Bengal, India – Eliminated on Episode 6: 19 May
- Yogendra Pathak from London, England, United Kingdom – Eliminated on Episode 4: 12 May
- Tushar Sinha from Silchar, Assam, India – Eliminated on Episode 10: 2 June
- Anita Bhatt from Lucknow, Uttar Pradesh, India – Eliminated on Episode 12: 9 June
- Shreshta Banerjee from Kolkata, West Bengal, India – Eliminated on Episode 15: 22 June
- Nirupama Dey from Agartala, Tripura, India – Eliminated on Episode 25: 27 July
- Joy Chakraborty from Lumding, Assam, India – Eliminated on Episode 29: 10 August
- Mussarat Abbas Pakistan ki Shaan From Lahore, Pakistan - Eliminated on Episode 39: 14 September
- Aneek Dhar from Kolkata, West Bengal, India – WINNER

=== Josh – Bappi Lahiri ===
- Reecha Tripaathi from Vancouver, British Columbia, Canada – Eliminated on Episode 16: 23 June
- Sunil Kumar from Sunder Nagar, Himachal Pradesh, India – Eliminated on Episode 16: 23 June
- Koyel Chaterjee from Dhanbad, Jharkhand, India – Eliminated on Episode 4: 12 May
- Sikandar Ali from Karachi, Pakistan – Eliminated on Episode 14: 16 June
- Abhijeet Kosambi (Sa Re Ga Ma Pa Marathi winner) from Kolhapur, Maharashtra, India Eliminated on Episode 27: 3 August
- Mauli Dave from Houston, United States – Eliminated on Episode 37: 7 September
- Sumedha Karmahe from Rajnandgaon, Chhattisgarh, India – 4th Runner-up. Eliminated on Episode 41: 21 September

=== Hit Squad – Vishal–Shekhar ===
- Apurva Shah from Mumbai, India Eliminated on Episode 23: 20 July
- Saaberi Bhattacharya from Kolkata, West Bengal, India Eliminated on Episode 16: 23 June
- Meghna Verma from Pune, Maharashtra, India – Eliminated on Episode 10: 2 June
- Sarika Singh from Indore, Madhya Pradesh, India – Eliminated on Episode 8: 26 May
- Imran Aslam from Johannesburg, South Africa – Eliminated on Episode 8: 26 May
- Sumana Ganguly from Toronto, Ontario, Canada – Eliminated on Episode 15: 22 June
- Junaid Sheikh from Karachi, Pakistan - Eliminated on Episode 33: 24 August
- Harpreet Deol from Ludhiana, Punjab, India – Eliminated on Episode 15: 22 June; voted back in the show during the "Bramhastra" week from the Josh Gharana. Finally Eliminated on Episode 35: 31 August
- Raja Hasan from Bikaner, Rajasthan, India – Eliminated on Episode 16: 23 June; voted back in the show during the "Bramhastra" week. Mega finalist and 1st runner-up.

=== Eklavya ===
In addition, there was another Gharana called the Eklavya Gharana – it was a "reserved force" of eight singers. The exact purpose of this Gharana was not mentioned during the initial days of the show but soon it was determined that it basically prevented a Gharana from getting eliminated in the initial rounds. The contestants in this Eklavya Gharana performed on the 2nd episode of the show. Later on, each week two contestants from this Gharana were chosen to join a mentor's Gharana after that mentor has had any of his contestants eliminated the previous week.

- Sumana Ganguly from Toronto, Ontario, Canada – transferred to Hit Squad (15 June)
- Sumedha Karmahe from Rajnandgaon, Chhattisgarh, India – transferred to Josh Gharana (18 May)
- Tushar Sinha from India – transferred to Jai Mata Di Let's Rock Gharana (18 May)
- Anita Bhatt from Lucknow, India – transferred to Jai Mata Di Let's Rock Gharana (25 May)
- Raja Hasan from Bikaner, Rajasthan, India – transferred to Hit-Squad Gharana (15 June)
- Brijesh Shandilya from Basti, Uttar Pradesh, India – transferred to Yalgaar Gharana (25 May)

The only two contestants who never appeared in the competition after their performance on 5 May 2007 were:

- Sayan Chaudhary from Kolkata, India
- Binoy Mohanty from Raurkela, Orissa, India

=== Episode themes ===
Just as was done in previous Sa Re Ga Ma Pa shows, the idea of themes is featured to determine the contestants' versatility and ability to sing different genres.

- Episode 01 – Week 1 (Fri, 4 May) – Introduction to Indian contestants in Gharanas
- Episode 02 – Week 1 (Sat, 5 May) – Introduction to foreign contestants in Gharanas
- Episode 03 – Week 2 (Fri, 11 May) – Songs of R.D. Burman and Asha Bhosle
- Episode 04 – Week 2 (Sat, 12 May) – Modern hit songs
- Episode 05 – Week 3 (Fri, 18 May) – Guru's choice
- Episode 06 – Week 3 (Sat, 19 May) – Contestant's choice
- Episode 07 – Week 4 (Fri, 25 May) – Songs of Bappi Lahiri
- Episode 08 – Week 4 (Sat, 26 May) – Contestant's choice
- Episode 09 – Week 5 (Fri, 1 June) – Songs of Ismail Darbar
- Episode 10 – Week 5 (Sat, 2 June) – Songs of Raj Kapoor
- Episode 11 – Week 6 (Fri, 8 June) – Songs of Himesh Reshammiya
- Episode 12 – Week 6 (Sat, 9 June) – Songs of Rajesh Roshan
- Episode 13 – Week 7 (Fri, 15 June) – Songs of Vishal–Shekhar
- Episode 14 – Week 7 (Sat, 16 June) – Contestant's choice
- Episode 15 – Week 8 (Fri, 22 June) – Contestant's choice (Chakravyuh phase)
- Episode 16 – Week 8 (Sat, 23 June) – Contestant's choice (Chakravyuh phase)
- Episode 17 – Week 9 (Fri, 29 June) – Contestant's choice (Bramhastra phase)
- Episode 18 – Week 9 (Sat, 30 June) – Punjabi or Punjabi flavor songs (Bramhastra phase)
- Episode 19 – Week 10 (Fri, 6 July) – Contestant's choice (Agnipariksha phase)
- Episode 20 – Week 10 (Sat, 7 July) – Contestant's choice (Agnipariksha phase)
- Episode 21 – Week 11 (Fri, 13 July) – Old romantic Songs
- Episode 22 – Week 11 (Sat, 14 July) – Rain/Monsoon Songs
- Episode 23 – Week 12 (Fri, 20 July) – Club Songs
- Episode 24 – Week 12 (Sat, 21 July) – Songs of Salman Khan
- Episode 25 – Week 13 (Fri, 27 July) – Superhits of 60's and 70's
- Episode 26 – Week 13 (Sat, 28 July) – Songs of the contestants' favorite singer
- Episode 27 – Week 14 (Fri, 3 August) – Sad Songs
- Episode 28 – Week 14 (Sat, 4 August) – Friendship Day special
- Episode 29 – Week 15 (Fri, 10 August) – Universal hits
- Episode 30 – Week 15 (Sat, 11 August) – Independence Day special
- Episode 31 – Week 16 (Fri, 17 August) – Dance songs
- Episode 32 – Week 16 (Sat, 18 August) – Qawwali
- Episode 33 – Week 17 (Fri, 24 August) – New romantic songs
- Episode 34 – Week 17 (Sat, 25 August) – Songs of Akshay Kumar
- Episode 35 – Week 18 (Fri, 31 August) – TV stars' choice Songs
- Episode 36 – Week 18 (Sat, 1 September) – Folk songs
- Episode 37 – Week 19 (Fri, 7 September) – Comedy songs
- Episode 38 – Week 19 (Sat, 8 September) – Songs of the contestants' favorite actor
- Episode 39 – Week 20 (Fri, 14 September) – Black-and-white films' songs
- Episode 40 – Week 20 (Sat, 15 September) – Wedding Songs
- Episode 41 – Week 21 (Fri, 21 September) – Stage songs
- Episode 42 – Week 21 (Sat, 22 September) – Round 1: (Raj) Kapoor Family Songs | Round 2: Songs of Kareena Kapoor
- Episode 43 – Week 22 (Fri, 28 September) – Round 1: Ghazals | Round 2: Semi-classical songs
- Episode 44 – Week 22 (Sat, 29 September) – Round 1: Songs of Om Shanti Om | Round 2: Song choice of Shah Rukh Khan
- Episode 45 – Week 23 (Fri, 5 October) – Round 1: Violin Songs | Round 2: Guitar Songs | Round 3: Songs to express yourself (Nokia Express)
- Episode 46 – Week 23 (Sat, 6 October) – Round 1: White Feather Films' songs | Round 2: White Feather Films' emotional songs | Round 3: Song for one of the cast/crew of Dus Kahaniyan

=== "Mahagurus" ===
The Mahagurus appeared as judges in the semi-finals. They "commented" and decided who the top contestants were on the performance episodes and also decided who got eliminated on the "elimination day" during the initial rounds.

- Episode 1 & 2 – Week 1 (4 May & 5 May) – None
- Episode 3 & 4 – Week 2 (11 May & 12 May) – Ghulam Ali and Asha Bhosle
- Episode 5 & 6 – Week 3 (18 May & 19 May) – Asha Bhosle
- Episode 7 & 8 – Week 4 (25 May & 26 May) – Asha Bhosle
- Episode 9 & 10 – Week 5 (1 June & 2 June) – Mohammed Zahur Khayyam and Rajesh Roshan
- Episode 11 & 12 – Week 6 (8 June & 9 June) – Mohammed Zahur Khayyam and Rajesh Roshan
- Episode 13 & 14 – Week 7 (15 June & 16 June) – Mohammed Zahur Khayyam and Rajesh Roshan (Roshan was not present on 16 June)
- Episode 15 & 16 – Week 8 (22 June & 23 June) – Anandji Virji Shah

== Bramhastra ==
The "Bramhastra" round ran through Week 9. This round basically allowed the public to bring an eliminated contestant back into the competition. The gharana who received the Bramhastra got to choose two eliminated contestants for the finals (Agnipariksha). Vishal–Shekhar received this Bramhastra and they chose 6 contestants. The six contestants were:

- Sarika Singh (Hit Squad)
- Sunil Kumar (Josh)
- Raja Hassan (Hit Squad)
- Saaberi Bhattacharya (Hit Squad)
- Harpreet Deol (Hit Squad)
- Desh Gaurav Singh (Yalgaar)

Of the six contestants that were chosen by Vishal–Shekhar, the two contestants with most votes from the public and subsequently elected and brought back into the competition were:

- Raja Hassan with 31% of the votes
- Harpreet Deol with 20% of the votes

== Top 14 finalists ==
The 14 finalists were announced at the end of the episode broadcast on 29 June 2007. That year, Aneek Dhar and Abhijeet Kosambi, winners of the regional spinoffs, Sa Re Ga Ma Pa Bangla and Sa Re Ga Ma Pa Marathi, got direct entry as finalists. Their direct entry into the finals caused some controversy that Ismail Darbar had the courage point out. However, after Himesh Reshammiya pleaded with Ismail Darbar, the issue dissolved. See Aneek-Abhijit controversy section for further details.

These are the names of the top fifteen finalists listed in order.

- Aneek Dhar- Winner (Jai Mata Di Let's Rock Gharana)
- Raja Hassan- 1st Runner Up (Hit-Squad Gharana)
- Amanat Ali- 2nd Runner Up (Yalgaar Gharana)

Eliminated Contestants:

- Poonam Yadav- (Yalgaar Gharana)
- Sumedha Karmahe- (Josh Gharana)
- Mussarat Abbas- (Jai Mata Di Let's Rock Gharana)
- Mauli Dave- (Josh Gharana)
- Harpreet Deol- (Hit-Squad Gharana)
- Junaid Sheikh- (Hit-Squad Gharana)
- Joy Chakraborty- (Jai Mata Di Let's Rock Gharana)
- Abhijeet Kosambi- (Josh Gharana)
- Nirupama Dey- (Jai Mata Di Let's Rock Gharana)
- Apurva Shah- (Hit-Squad Gharana)
- Rimi Dhar- (Yalgaar Gharana)

== Celebrity guests ==
- Week 6 (8 June) – Mr. Vipin Reshammiya – Father of Himesh Reshammiya
- Week 9 (28 June) – Mrs. Madhu Reshammiya – Mother of Himesh Reshammiya
- Week 9 (29 June) – Director Anil Sharma and Sunny Deol
- Week 11 (14 July) – Shamita Shetty and Dia Mirza
- Week 12 (21 July) – Salman Khan and Lara Dutta
- Week 13 (27 July) – Ritesh Deshmukh and Anubhav Sinha
- Week 13 (28 July) – Vidya Balan and Sajid Khan
- Week 14 (4 August) – Fardeen Khan
- Week 15 (11 August) – Kapil Dev
- Week 17 (25 August) – Akshay Kumar
- Week 18 (1 September) – Daler Mehndi and Lalu Prasad Yadav
- Week 19 (7 September) – Aashish Chaudhary and Asrani
- Week 20 (15 September) – Tusshar Kapoor, Rajpal Yadav and Kunal Khemu
- Week 21 (22 September) – Kareena Kapoor
- Week 22 (28 September) – Pandit Jasraj and Jagjit Singh
- Week 22 (29 September) – Farah Khan, Deepika Padukone and Shreyas Talpade
- Week 23 (5 October) – Adnan Sami
- Week 23 (6 October) – Cast of Dus Kahaniyan (22 guests!)
- Week 24 (13 October) (Finale) – Akshay Kumar, Vidya Balan and Dia Mirza

== Semi-finals and finals elimination charts ==
Contestants are in alphabetical order by last name, then by reverse chronological order of elimination.

=== Semi-finals ===
Legend
Female	Male	Top 14	Top 24	Top 32

Contestant did not perform during that week

Top contestant of the week

Stage:			Top 32			Top 24				
Elimination Day:			12/5	19/5	26/5	2/6	9/6	16/6	22/6*	23/6*
Place	Contestant	Gharana	Result							
	Amanat Ali	Yalgaar				Btm 3				
	Poonam Yadav	Yalgaar								
	Sumedha Karmahe	Josh								
	Mussarat Abbas	Jai Mata Di Let's Rock		Btm 3						
	Mauli Dave	Josh		Btm 3			Btm 3			
	Junaid Sheikh	Hit Squad		Btm 3			Btm 3			
	Joy Chakroborty	Jai Mata Di Let's Rock			Btm 3					
	Nirupama Dey	Jai Mata Di Let's Rock								
	Apurva Shah	Hit Squad	Btm 3							
	Rimi Dhar	Yalgaar				Btm 3				
11–12	Raja Hassan	Hit Squad						Btm 3		Elim
11–12	Saaberi Bhattacharya	Hit Squad		Btm 3			Btm 3			Elim
13–14	Reecha Tripaathi	Josh			Btm 3			Btm 3		Elim
13–14	Sunil Kumar	Josh	Btm 3			Btm 3				Elim
15–16	Shresta Banerjee	Jai Mata Di Let's Rock	Btm 3			Btm 3			Elim	
15–16	Harpreet Deol	Josh					Btm 3		Elim	
17–18	Sumana Ganguly	Hit Squad						Btm 3	Elim	
17–18	Wasi Efandi	Yalgaar			Btm 3			Btm 3	Elim	
19–20	Sikandar Ali	Josh						Elim		
19–20	Jyoti Mishra	Yalgaar			Btm 3			Elim		
21–22	Brijesh Shandilya	Yalgaar					Elim			
21–22	Anita Bhatt	Jai Mata Di Let's Rock					Elim			
23–24	Tushar Sinha	Rock				Elim				
23–24	Meghna Verma	Hit Squad	Btm 3			Elim				
25–26	Sarika Singh	Hit Squad			Elim					
25–26	Imran Aslam	Hit Squad			Elim					
27–28	Desh Gaurav Singh	Yalgaar		Elim						
27–28	Amrita Chatterjee	Jai Mata Di Let's Rock		Elim						
29–30	Yogendra Pathak	Jai Mata Di Let's Rock	Elim							
29–30	Koyal Chaterjee	Josh	Elim							
31–32	Sayan Chaudhary	N/A								
31–32	Binoy Mohanty	N/A								

* During the week of 22 June, there was no separate performance/elimination episode as the week marked the beginning of the "Chakravyuh" phase. However, eight contestants were eliminated that week.

=== Finals (top 14) ===
Stage:				Agnipariksha (Top 14)													
Elimination Day:				13/7	20/7	27/7	3/8	10/8	17/8^{†}	24/8	31/8	7/9	14/9	21/9	28/9	5/10	13/10
Place	Country	Contestant	Gharana	Result													
1	India	Aneek Dhar	Jai Mata Di Let's Rock					Btm 2								Third	Winner
2	India	Raja Hassan	Hit Squad										Btm 2				Runner-up
3	Pakistan	Amanat Ali	Yalgaar				Btm 3		Btm 3							Second	2nd Runner-up
4	India	Poonam Yadav	Yalgaar											Btm 2	Elim		
5	India	Sumedha Karmahe	Josh					Btm 3				Btm 2		Elim			
6	Pakistan	Mussarat Abbas	Jai Mata Di Let's Rock			Btm 3			Btm 3		Btm 2		Elim				
7	India	Mauli Dave	Josh		Btm 2						Btm 3	Elim					
8	India	Harpreet Deol	Hit Squad		Btm 3		Btm 2			Btm 2	Elim						
9	Pakistan	Junaid Shaikh	Hit Squad	Btm 2					Btm 3	Elim							
10	India	Joy Chakroborty	Jai Mata Di Let's Rock					Elim									
11	India	Abhjit Kosambi	Josh			Btm 2	Elim										
12	India	Nirupama Dey	Jai Mata Di Let's Rock			Elim											
13	India	Apurva Shah	Hit Squad	Btm 3	Elim												
14	India	Rimi Dhar	Yalgaar	Elim													

In the Agnipariksha round, eliminations are based on public voting. Public voting is done through SMS, telephone or online. Each week, the contestant with lowest votes is eliminated.

Additionally, if all the contestants of a Gharana get eliminated, the Gharana also gets eliminated and subsequently the mentor(s) have to leave the show.

^{†} During the week of 17 August, there was no eliminated contestant. That week's votes were added to the votes for the week of 24 August, and Junaid was then eliminated on the episode airing on 24 August.

== Sa Re Ga Ma Pa Ek Shaam Taj Ke Naam ==
Sa Re Ga Ma Pa Ek Shaam Taj Ke Naam was a one-day special episode organised by the SRGMP team as a tribute to the Taj Mahal and also dedicated to request and encourage people to vote for the Taj Mahal as one of the New Seven Wonders of the World.

As well as performances from the contestants of the season, the special episode also featured performances from contestants of previous SRGMP seasons such as Twinkle Bajpai, Sanchita Bhattacharya, Diwakar Sharma and Sameer Mohammed.
