= Mirza: Part 1 – Joker =

2024 Indian Bengali action-thriller film

- Theatrical poster for the film
- Directed by: Sumeet Goradia; Saahil Goradia
- Written by: Sumeet Saahil
- Screenplay by: Arnab Bhaumik
- Story by: Arnab Bhaumik; Sumeet Saahil
- Produced by: Ankush Hazra; Abir Gupta; Acropoliis Entertainment
- Starring: Ankush Hazra; Oindrila Sen; Kaushik Ganguly; Rishi Kaushik; Priya Mondal; Shoaib Kabeer
- Cinematography: Animesh Ghorui
- Edited by: Sanglap Bhaumik
- Music by: Ishan Mitra; Aneek Dhar
- Production company: Ankush Hazra Motion Pictures
- Distributed by: PVR Inox Pictures
- Release date: 11 April 2024
- Running time: 165 minutes
- Country: India
- Language: Bengali
- Budget: ₹4.5 crore

Mirza: Part 1 – Joker, or simply Mirza, is a 2024 Indian Bengali-language action thriller film co-written and directed by Sumeet-Saahil, making their directorial debut. Produced by Ankush Hazra in collaboration with Acropoliis entertainment with Abir Gupta being the Associate Producer, under the banner of Ankush Hazra Motion Pictures.

The film marked Ankush's first venture as a producer. It stars Ankush in the titular role, alongside an ensemble cast of Kaushik Ganguly, Oindrila Sen, Rishi Kaushik and Shoaib Kabeer in the lead roles, with Jisshu Sengupta in a special appearance. It revolves around Mirza, who raises his voice against the involvement of children in drugs smuggling, after one of his child companions, gets mistakenly killed by the drug lords.

Production difficulties, ranging from script disagreements and reshoots with Nexgen Ventures, postponed Mirza's release several times. Finally, Ankush decided to produce the film under the banner of his own production house. The first instalment of a two-part film, it was released in the theatres on 11 April 2024, on the event of Eid. The film received positive reviews from critics and audiences alike. A sequel titled Mirza: Part 2 – Tiger was announced at the post credit scene.

== Synopsis ==
Mirza, a child, joins the underworld of crime to avenge the death of his foster father Murshid Sheikh; he gradually rises to the pinnacle of power. There is already a king, Sultan, who controls the whole drug mafia syndicate with his son Azhar. Brutal violence and erupts as Mirza clashes with Sultan and other gang lords who try to bring him down.

A police officer, Kaustav, has begun his mission to make a drug free society. He faces off against Sultan, Azhar and Mirza. Separately to this, Mirza falls in love with a fisherman by the name of Muskan. Mirza bluffs the other characters in order to free from the battle. At the end, there is a cameo of Tiger.

== Cast ==
- Ankush Hazra as Mirza (Joker)
- Kaushik Ganguly as Sultan (Ace), a drug lord
- Oindrila Sen as SI Muskan (Queen)
- Rishi Kaushik as NCB officer Kaustav Sen (Jack)
- Shoaib Kabeer as Azhar (King), Sultan's son
- Priya Mondal
- Shantilal Mukherjee as OC Murshid Sheikh, foster father of Mirza
- Sankar Debnath as Malik Bhai
- Rajat Ganguly as Malay Bhowmick
- Krishnendu Chakraborty as Bilaal, Azhar's henchman
- Sumit Ganguly
- Jammy Banerjee
- Kunal Bhandari
- Moulik Ghosh
- Sankhadeep Banerjee
- Beas Dhar
- Mina Ghosh
- Ratan Sarkhel
- Ayush Majumder
- Tamaghno Paul
- Tarit Byabarta
- Rahul Barui
- Biswaroop Biswas
- Arup Kumar Deb
- Bonnis Chakraborty
- Rishaan Chakraborty
- Ryan Guha Neogi

=== Special appearance ===
- Jisshu Sengupta as Tiger Bhai

== Production ==
=== Development ===
In 2022, Ankush announced the title of the film and the director. On 8 September 2022, the announcement teaser of the film was released, revealing his first look. On the event of Mahalaya 2023, the teaser of the film was released. Later, due to some difference and disagreement, Ankush decided to produce the film completely under his production house. He accused Raktim Chatterjee, the owner of Nexgen Ventures, for his mentality and background.

On 9 December 2023, he released a new announcement teaser under the banner of his own production house's YouTube channel. On 13 February 2024, he released the teaser of the film.

=== Filming ===
After detaching with Nexgen Ventures, the filming started on 13 December 2023. Most of the filming was done in Kolkata, Kumortuli and Odisha.

On 31 December 2023, Ankush succumbed to an injury in the patella of his knee bone. He had to take bed rest and started shooting for the action sequences almost one and a half months later. He shot for the other scenes in that time. On social media, he mentioned that while shooting for an action film after almost six years, he realised why commercial action films are rarely made in Tollywood. Later, Hazra said that he is using a body double for shooting a huge part of the action scenes. He also went under a surgery of his patella, after the release of the teaser.

=== Marketing ===
On 13 February 2024, the teaser of the film was released on Ankush Hazra Motion Pictures YouTube channel, which gathered appreciation from the critics as well as the audience. For marketing, ground level promotional events have been conducted in Medinipur, Berachampa, Barasat, Madhyamgram, Bardhaman, South Kolkata and Berhampore. He has also given interviews with Oindrilla Sen to all the major Bengali film critics, YouTubers and Bengali media including ABP Ananda and Sangbad Pratidin. The music of the film was launched at an event at New Town, Kolkata.

The trailer of the film was released on 31 March 2024 on Ankush Hazra Motion Pictures YouTube channel. In total, the trailer has been released on the YouTube channels of 6 other large production houses of West Bengal, which is the largest ever trailer release for any Bengali film.

== Soundtrack ==
Mirza

Soundtrack album by Ishan Mitra and Aneek Dhar
- Recorded: 2022–23
- Studios: Meet Brothers Studio; Wow & Flutters Studio; Roots Music Factory
- Genre: Film soundtrack
- Length: 7:03
- Language: Bengali
- Label: Surinder Films
- Producer: nkush Hazra Motion Pictures

The music of the film is composed by Ishan Mitra and Aneek Dhar. The lyrics are written by Barish and Pranjal Das.

The first single "Ghalib" was released on 15 March 2024. The second single "Elo Mirza" was released on 24 March 2024.

Track listing
No.	Title	Lyrics	Music	Singer(s)	Length
1.	"Ghalib"	Barish	Ishan Mitra	Ishan Mitra	3:21
2.	"Elo Mirza"	Pranjal Das	Aneek Dhar	Amit Mishra, Aneek Dhar	3:42
Total length:					7:03

== Release ==
The film was initially scheduled to release on 10 April 2024, on the occasion of Eid. Three days prior to release the film was postponed and released on 11 April 2024.

== Reception ==
=== Box office ===
The producer informed that they have already recovered 60% of costs from digital and satellite rights after its 1-week run. As per the producer, the film earned 1.63 lakhs on the opening day and around 8 lakhs in the 1st week from the national multiplex chains only. The lifetime collection stands around 1.75cr.

=== Critical reception ===
The film received positive reviews from critics. Poorna Banerjee of the Times of India rated the film 3 out of 5 stars. Praising the film, she wrote that the film is an action-packed commercial entertainer with good performances and possibility of a sequel. She praised the acting of the whole cast, the fast-paced screenplay, the songs, well shot action sequences and witty dialogues.

Shamayitaa Chakrabborty of OTTplay rated the film 3 out of 5 stars and wrote "Despite being imperfect, Mirza is a valiant effort to bring commercial Bengali films back into business. She criticised the weak writing, loud BGM, songs and the stretched ending. But also praised the comic punchlines, fight sequences, acting of the whole cast and cinematography.

Agnivo Niyogi of The Telegraph rated the film on a positive note. He praised the director duo, the acting of Ankush and Oindrila but also criticised the length .He wrote "It has the feel of 90's action dramas where the protagonist is smart and unbeatable but is still not unnecessarily larger-than-life. But the film tends to lose its grip in the second half due to lack of logical consistency certain times."

Suparna Majumder of Sangbad Pratidin wrote "The music is good but not up to the mark. The movie lacks logic at certain parts. Neither the action nor witty dialogues are the USP of this film. It is the storyline along with the performance of Ankush and Oindrila." Overall, she praised such an attempt of commercial potboiler in Bengali cinema.

== Sequel ==
A sequel titled Mirza: Part 2 – Tiger has been confirmed by Ankush.
