= Iris Maity =

Indian television actress and model

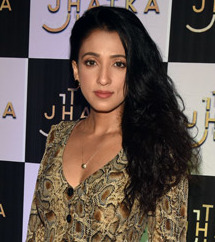
- Iris Maity graces the launch of Jhatka club in 2019
- Born: Iris Maity; Mumbai
- Occupations: Model, actress
- Years active: 2008–2019

Iris Maity is an Indian model and actress. She won the reality competition series Get Gorgeous Season 5. She also participated in the reality show Bigg Boss Bangla 1 in 2013.

== Early life ==
After her graduation in science, she earned an MBA degree in marketing. She is a trained dancer, and can also sing and paint. Her father, Bhaskar Maity, is a football player, who represented India in the Asian Games, 1979. Her mother is a homemaker, and she also has a younger brother. Iris was crowned Get Gorgeous 2008. Get Gorgeous is Channel V India's launch pad for aspiring models across India. As winner of Channel V India's Get Gorgeous 5, Iris won ₹1 million (US$12,000) contract with Channel V India and ICE Model Management. She also won Miss India Tourism Metropolitan in 2007. She was adjudged with the "I AM Photogenic" title at the I AM She 2010, the first Miss India Universe pageant, which was held on 28 May 2010 in Mumbai. She is also trained in Martial Arts.

== Career ==
Iris is a model and actress, and has appeared in a few Hindi films. She is the winner of Channel V India's Get Gorgeous 5, an Indian reality show. She also participated in the first season of the most controversial non-fiction popular Bengali reality show Bigg Boss Bangla 1. She has appeared in print campaigns with Fair and Lovely, Nestle Munch, Satya Paul and a TVC for 7 UP. She worked with designers Manish Malhotra, Varun Behl and others. She had roles in mainstream Hindi movies such as Soch Lo as Riva and Tutiya Dil as Anuradha (Anu).

== Filmography ==
=== Films ===
Year	Film	Role	Notes
2010	Soch Lo	Riva	Supporting Role
2012	Tutiya Dil	Anuradha (Anu)	Supporting Role

=== Television ===
Year	Show	Role	Notes
2008	Get Gorgeous	Contestant(Winner)	Reality show
2013	Bigg Boss Bangla 1	Contestant (Evicted on Day 49)	Reality show
2013 - 2016	SuperCops vs Supervillains	Inspector Lara	Lead role
2016	Naagarjuna - Ek Yoddha	Chitrāngadā	Cameo role
2017	Prem Ya Paheli - Chandrakanta	Bichhoo Kanya Shyamala / Rajkumari Taramati	Negative role
2019	Dil Toh Happy Hai Ji	Anaya Grover	Supporting role
2019	D.A.T.E.	Swati	Lead role - short film
2019	Kullfi Kumarr Bajewala	Dr. Nandini	Supporting role

=== Web ===
Year	Name	Role	Platform
2019	Karrle Tu Bhi Mohabbat	Sanam Mehta	Alt Balaji
