= Chengiz =

2023 Indian Bengali film by Rajesh Ganguly

- Theatrical release poster
- Directed by: Rajesh Ganguly
- Written by: Neeraj Pandey; Rajesh Ganguly
- Screenplay by: Rajesh Ganguly
- Based on: Calcutta Underworld
- Produced by: Jeet; Gopal Madnani; Amit Jumrani
- Starring: Jeet; Rohit Roy; Susmita Chatterjee; Shataf Figar
- Cinematography: Manas Ganguly
- Edited by: Malay Laha
- Music by: Kaushik Guddu; Aneek Dhar; Beatz MA
- Production companies: Grassroot Entertainment; Jeetz Filmworks
- Distributed by: Jeetz Filmworks (Bengali); AA Films (Hindi)
- Release date: 21 April 2023
- Running time: 153 minutes
- Country: India
- Language: Bengali

Chengiz (Bengali pronunciation: [tʃɛŋɡɪz]; subtitled as The One Who Has No Boundaries No Limits) is a 2023 Indian Bengali-language epic period gangster action thriller film co-written and directed by Rajesh Ganguly. Based on a story written by Neeraj Pandey about Calcutta underworld, the film was produced by Jeet, Gopal Madnani, and Amit Jumrani under the banners of Grassroot Entertainment and Jeetz Filmworks. It stars Jeet in the titular role, as well as in dual role, alongside Susmita Chatterjee, Rohit Roy and Shataf Figar in another pivotal roles. The film shows the situation of Kolkata from mid 70s to late 90s following the journey of a child named Jaidev Singh who struggles with his life since his childhood and later becomes the dreaded drug lord named Chengiz in the Calcutta underworld.

The film was announced in March 2022, being the 55th film of Jeet as the leading actor. Principal photography commenced in April 2022 in Kolkata, with additional shoots in Morocco and Thailand, and concluded in November 2022. The film's music was composed by Aneek Dhar and Kaushik-Guddu, with cinematography and editing handled by Manas Ganguly and Malay Laha respectively. The action sequences of the film were designed by Stunt Silva, while the dance sequences were choreographed by Imran Sardhariya.

Chengiz was theatrically released in India on 21 April 2023 in both Bengali and Hindi, becoming the first pan-Indian Bengali film to be released simultaneously in these two languages. It was a commercial success at the box office, running over for 210 days in theatres and emerged as the highest grossing Bengali film of 2023.

== Plot ==
In 1970, when Jaidev Singh was just ten years old, his life took a tragic turn in Durgapur, where his parents were killed by Rashid Khan, a local goon associated with criminal activities. The incident left young Jaidev orphaned and deeply affected by the violence surrounding him. Inspector Samir Sinha, his maternal uncle, took him under his care and raised him as his own son. However, Jaidev’s childhood trauma and the desire to avenge his parents’ deaths would eventually lead him down a dangerous path, far removed from the life his uncle might have hoped for him.

By 1976, at the age of sixteen, Jaidev had grown determined to settle the score with Rashid Khan. He eventually killed Rashid to avenge his parents, marking a decisive turning point in his life. This act drew him into the criminal world of Calcutta, where he began working under the powerful gangster Mohammed Omar, popularly known as Nalli Bhai. As Jaidev became increasingly involved in the city's underworld, he adopted the name Chengiz, gradually building a new identity that would become synonymous with power, violence and ambition. His entry into organised crime marked the beginning of his transformation from a revenge-driven teenager into a rising figure in the criminal hierarchy.

By 1995, Chengiz had moved beyond being merely a subordinate of Nalli Bhai. Through years of criminal activity, strategic alliances and the expansion of his influence, he began establishing his own crime network across West Bengal, Uttar Pradesh and Bihar. His growing power, however, brought him into direct conflict with the law, particularly with his maternal uncle, ACP Samir Sinha. Appointed to dismantle Chengiz’s criminal empire, Samir found himself pursuing the very young man he had once taken in and raised as family. This created a deeply personal conflict between the two, as their relationship as uncle and nephew became entangled in a prolonged battle between law enforcement and organised crime. Their confrontation developed into a cat-and-mouse game, with Samir determined to bring Chengiz to justice while Chengiz continued to expand his influence and evade arrest.

In 2001, Chengiz managed to escape from Calcutta through a carefully planned deception. His resemblance to Daniel D’Souza became an important element in his escape, allowing him to exploit the confusion surrounding their identities. As the police failed to apprehend him, Chengiz remained beyond their immediate reach, leaving behind an underworld whose criminal networks had been shaped by his ambitions. His disappearance further strengthened the mystery surrounding his fate, while Samir Sinha was left without the closure of bringing his own nephew to justice. Chengiz’s ability to evade capture reinforced his reputation as a dangerous and calculating figure who could survive even when the police appeared to have cornered him.

The story reaches its conclusion in 2022, when an older Jaidev Singh, still known as Chengiz, is seen having lunch at a hotel in Marrakech, Morocco. The scene suggests that, despite the passage of decades and his apparent distance from Calcutta, Chengiz has not necessarily abandoned his influence over the criminal world he once dominated. His presence abroad leaves open the possibility that he continues to exercise control over elements of his former network from a distance. The ending also implies that his connection with Samir Sinha remains unresolved, with Chengiz apparently maintaining a close watch on his uncle. Rather than presenting the ageing gangster as a figure whose era has definitively ended, the final scene leaves the impression that he remains a shadowy presence whose influence extends beyond geographical boundaries.

== Cast ==
- Jeet in dual role as
  - Jaidev Singh aka Chengiz, the underworld Kingpin of Calcutta from 1995 to 2001
  - Daniel D'Souza, a software engineer
- Dev Chanda as Jaidev's childhood friend
    - Ayush Das as teenage Jaidev Singh
- Rohit Roy as ACP Samir Sinha, maternal uncle of Jaidev aka Chengiz (who was hired to look into Chengiz's case)
- Susmita Chatterjee as Nandini Sen, Chengiz's wife
- Suvosmita Mukherjee as Debjani Bhowmik, Debu and Rupali's daughter
- Shataf Figar as MD. Omar Khalid alias Baren Nalli, gangster of Central Calcutta (from 1976 to 1995)
- Amlan Majumdar as Manik Sanyal alias Thunto Joga, gangster of East Kolkata (from 1976 to 2001)
- Indrajit Mazumder as Mughal Abbas alias Mirchi Bhai, gangster of Kidderpore dock area (from 1976 to 2001)
- Avrajit Chakraborty as Ispahani
- Sohan Banerjee as DCDD Goutam Bose
- Sam Mukherjee as Andrew Brazgana
  - Tuhin Ghosh Chakraborty as teenage Andrew Brazgana
- Sudip Mukherjee as Commissioner Amit Dhar
- Biswaroop Biswas as Arun Roy aka Kallu, an assassin
- Annine Sen as Purbali, Ispahani's wife
- Ayesha Bhattacharya as Sonali, Andrew's wife
- Mousumi Das as Rupali, Debu's wife
- Somnath Kar as Binay Bose IPS
- Vascar Dev as Mohsin Khan IPS

== Production ==
=== Development and Pre-production ===
In February 2022, rumours reported that screenplay is going to be a gangster drama directed by Rajesh Ganguly, with a story written by Neeraj Pandey and Ganguly himself. It was also considered to be the 2nd collaboration of the trio, Jeet, Rajesh Ganguly and Neeraj Pandey after 8 years of The Royal Bengal Tiger, which marked their first film together. On 29 March 2022, the film confirmed its title Chengiz, with muharat having been done. Makeup artist Somnath Kundu, famous for making prosthetics, was hired to design the looks of the characters. Imran Sardhariya, who choreographed dance sequences in Jeet's previous film Raavan, was announced to be a part of it. Later Stunt Silva, a renowned fight master from Chennai, was hired to upscale the action sequences of the film.

=== Casting ===
Model Susmita Chatterjee, who made her acting debut with Prem Tame (2021) was signed to play the love interest of the protagonist. Shataf Figar, who played the main antagonist in Jeet's previous film Raavan, was reported to play another pivotal role. Rohit Bose Roy, was signed to portray an important role, being the narrator of the whole film.

== Soundtrack ==
The soundtrack consists of three original songs composed by Aneek Dhar and Kaushik-Guddu, namely, "Widda", "Ebhabe Ke Daake" and "Ragada". Lyrics are written by Pranjal Das and Prosen.

The first song "Widda" was released on 27 March 2023 in Bengali and Hindi. The second song "Ebhabe Ke Daake" in Bengali and "Teri Meri Baatein" in Hindi, released on 8 April 2023. The third song "Ragada" was released on 13 April 2023 in Bengali and Hindi.

Original version
| No. | Title | Lyrics | Music | Singer(s) | Length |
|---|---|---|---|---|---|
| 1. | "Widda" | Pranjal Das | Aneek Dhar | Divya Kumar | 3:16 |
| 2. | "Ebhabe Ke Daake" | Prosen | Kaushik-Guddu | Arijit Singh | 4:14 |
| 3. | "Ragada" | Pranjal Das | Aneek Dhar | Mika Singh | 3:08 |
| Total length: | | | | | 10:08 |

Hindi version
| No. | Title | Lyrics | Music | Singer(s) | Length |
|---|---|---|---|---|---|
| 1. | "Widda" | Panchhi Jalonvi | Aneek Dhar | Divya Kumar | 3:16 |
| 2. | "Teri Meri Baatein" | Kunaal Vermaa | Kaushik-Guddu | Sanjith Hegde | 4:17 |
| 3. | "Ragada" | Shabbir Ahmed | Aneek Dhar | Mika Singh | 3:08 |
| Total length: | | | | | 10:11 |

== Marketing ==
The official Bengali teaser of the film was released on 30 November 2022. The official Hindi teaser of the film was released on 23 March 2023. The official Bengali and Hindi Trailer of the film was released on 3 April 2023.

== Release ==
=== Theatrical ===
The film was released simultaneously in Bengali and Hindi theatrically on 21 April 2023.

=== Screenings and statistics ===
Chengiz is released in approximately over 774 screens and with over 1232+ shows in all over India, which was "the highest in recent times for a Bengali film". In India, the Bengali version premiering on over 120 screens, with approximately 300 shows. The Hindi version was reported to showcase on over 650 screens, with over 800 shows.

== Reception ==
=== Box office ===
On its opening day, Chengiz collected a total net of ₹0.35 crore worldwide including ₹0.25 crore from the Bengali version. The Hindi dubbed version of the film initially released theatrically in over 800 shows across India and netted ₹0.10 crore at the Indian box office in the first day. The Hindi dubbed version collected ₹1.25 crore at the box office in its first week.

=== Critical response ===
Ujjainee Roy of The Times of India rated the film 3 out of 5 stars and wrote "Chengiz could make the team proud; it’s quite stately in production value and treatment. The action sequences choreographed by Stunt Silva are slick, well-timed and edited quite effortlessly with Jeet excelling in mano-a-mano combat scenes. The long gunfight sequence towards the climax, however, brings in too many elements. This can also be said of the film; it has too many players in the mix, and everyone is out to get Chengiz. After a point, you may stop caring about who’s the lesser (or the better) criminal."

Shamayita Chakraborty of OTTplay gave 3 out of 5 stars and wrote "Chengiz has a plot and fantastic action sequences but it lacks a convincing presentation. The film starts with sloppy acting and continues to reflect an iota of research as it progresses. Billed as a period film, Chengiz shows the ’90s Kolkata and yet the makers take no effort to make the period look convincing."

Agnivo Niyogi of The Telegraph reviewed the film and noted "Jeet, who is used to playing a superhuman hero in film after film, lives up to expectations. Be it the action, one-liners or an intense look, he knows how to get it right. Rohit Roy delivers a nuanced performance, especially his act of betrayal just before the climax. Shataf Figar, as Jaidev’s mentor, also makes an impact. The weak link is Jaidev’s love interest Nandini, who is reduced to a trophy wife." He also praised Ganguly's cinematography, the music and songs but criticised the too convoluted sub plots which elongates the runtime.
