= Riteish Deshmukh filmography =

Filmography of Indian actor Riteish Deshmukh

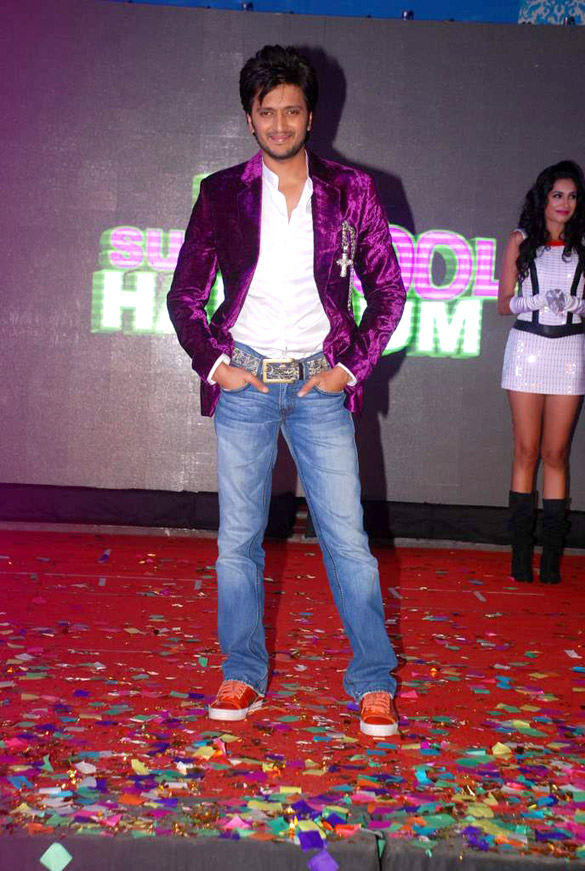
Deshmukh in 2012.

Riteish Deshmukh (born 17 December 1978) is an Indian actor, television presenter, producer, screenwriter and filmmaker who works in Hindi and Marathi cinema. He is the son of politician Vilasrao Deshmukh.

Deshmukh began his acting career with the film Tujhe Meri Kasam (2003) and since then he has worked in several successful films such as Masti (2004), Kyaa Kool Hai Hum (2005), Bluffmaster! (2005), Malamaal Weekly (2006), Heyy Babyy (2007), Dhamaal (2007), Housefull (2010), Double Dhamaal (2011), Housefull 2 (2012), Kyaa Super Kool Hain Hum (2012), Grand Masti (2013), Housefull 3 (2016), Total Dhamaal (2019), Housefull 4 (2019) and Baaghi 3 (2020). He received widespread critical acclaim for playing a serial killer in the romantic thriller Ek Villain (2014).

In Marathi cinema, he debuted as a producer with Balak-Palak (2013), made his Marathi acting debut with action film Lai Bhaari (2014) and made his directorial debut with Ved (2022).

Deshmukh is the board member of Mumbai Academy of the Moving Image.

== Film ==
- Note: all films are in Hindi, unless otherwise noted.

Year	Title	Role	Notes	Ref.
2003	Tujhe Meri Kasam	Rishikesh Bhosle		
2003	Out of Control	Jaswinder Singh Bedi		
2004	Masti	Amar Saxena		
2004	Bardaasht	Anuj Shrivastava		
2004	Naach	Diwakar Singh		
2005	Home Delivery	Suresh Trivedi	Cameo appearance	
2005	Kyaa Kool Hai Hum	Karan Pandey		
2005	Mr Ya Miss	Shekhar		
2005	Bluffmaster!	Aditya "Dittu" Shrivastav / Arjun Bajaj		
2006	Fight Club	Somil Gandhi		
2006	Malamaal Weekly	Kanhaiya Kumar Chaddha		
2006	Darna Zaroori Hai	Altaaf Roozu	Segment: Imaginary Ghost	
2006	Apna Sapna Money Money	Kishen and Shweta Tiwari		
2007	Namastey London	Bobby Bedi	Special appearance	
2007	Om Shanti Om	Himself	Special appearance in the song "Deewangi Deewangi"	
2007	Cash	Lucky Bagchi		
2007	Heyy Babyy	Tanmay Joglekar		
2007	Dhamaal	Deshbandhu Roy		
2008	De Taali	Paglu		
2008	Chamku	Arjun Tiwari		
2009	Do Knot Disturb	Goverdhan / Pappu Plumber		
2009	Aladin	Aladin Chatterjee		
2009	Kal Kisne Dekha	Kalicharan	Cameo appearance	
2009	Aao Wish Karein	Adult Bonny	Cameo appearance	
2010	Rann	Purab Shastri		
2010	Jaane Kahan Se Aayi Hai	Rajesh Parekh		
2010	Housefull	Boman "Bob" Rao		
2010	Jhootha Hi Sahi	Caller No.2 / Aman	Voiceover	
2011	F.A.L.T.U	Bajirao		
2011	Love Breakups Zindagi	Kunal Ahuja	Cameo appearance	
2011	Double Dhamaal	Deshbandhu Roy		
2012	Tere Naal Love Ho Gaya	Viren Chaudhary		
2012	Housefull 2	Jwala "Jolly" Kanojia		
2012	Kyaa Super Kool Hain Hum	Sidharth Roy		
2013	Grand Masti	Amar Saxena		
2013	Himmatwala	Ravi Singh Rana	Cameo appearance	
2013	Balak-Palak	—N/a	Marathi film; also producer	
2014	Humshakals	Pinku / Kumar / Sukhwinder		
2014	Ek Villain	Rakesh Mahadkar		
2014	Lai Bhaari	Mauli/Prince	Marathi film	
2014	Entertainment	Saral Mondal	Cameo appearance	
2016	Housefull 3	Tukaram "Teddy" Chaugule		
2016	Great Grand Masti	Amar Saxena		
2016	Kyaa Kool Hain Hum 3	Satya Nash	Cameo appearance	
2016	Mastizaade	Beep/Orgasm Baba	Cameo appearance	
2016	Banjo	Taraat Chaudhary		
2017	Bank Chor	Champak Chiplunkar		
2017	Faster Fene	—N/a	Marathi film; as producer	
2018	Welcome to New York	Himself		
2018	Mauli	Inspector Mauli / Mauli Deshmukh	Marathi film	
2019	Total Dhamaal	Lallan		
2019	Housefull 4	Bangdu / Roy Sinha		
2019	Marjaavaan	Vishnu Shetty		
2019	Dream Girl	Himself	Special appearance in the song "Dhagala Lagali"	
2020	Baaghi 3	Inspector Vikram Chaturvedi		
2022	Adrushya	Karthik Joshi	Cameo appearances	
2022	Ek Villain Returns	Rakesh Mahadkar	Cameo appearances	
2022	Plan A Plan B	Kosty		
2022	Mister Mummy	Amol Kote		
2022	Ved	Satya Jadhav	Marathi film; also director and screenwriter	
2024	Kakuda	Victor Jacobs		
2024	Visfot	Akash Shelar		
2025	Raid 2	Manohar Dhankar "Dada Bhai"		
2025	Housefull 5	Jalabuddin "Jolly 1"		
2025	Mastiii 4	Amar Saxena		
2026	Raja Shivaji	Chatrapati Shivaji	Hindi-Marathi bilingual film; also director, co-writer and producer	
2026	Dhamaal 4	Lallan		

== Television ==
Year	Title	Role	Notes
2008	9th IIFA Awards	Himself	Host
2009	10th IIFA Awards	Himself	Host
2010	11th IIFA Awards	Himself	Host
2011	12th IIFA Awards	Himself	Host
2011	Airtel Superstar Awards	Himself	Host
2013	Zee Cine Awards	Himself	Host
2013	India's Dancing Superstar	Himself	Judge
2013	CCL Glam Night	Himself	Host
2014	Zee Cine Awards	Himself	Host
2015	Sansui Colors Stardust Awards	Himself	Host
2016	Yaadon Ki Baaraat	Himself	Host
2016	Vikta Ka Uttar	Himself	Host
2024	Bigg Boss Marathi 5	Himself	Host
2026	Bigg Boss Marathi 6	Himself	Host

== Web series ==
Year	Title	Role	Notes
2021	Ladies vs Gentlemen	Host	
2022	Case Toh Banta Hai	Host	
2024	Pill	Prakash Chauhan	JioCinema series
2026–	Lock Upp: Sach Ya Saza	Host	

== See also ==
- List of awards and nominations received by Riteish Deshmukh
