= Masti (film series) =

2004 Indian film series

Masti series
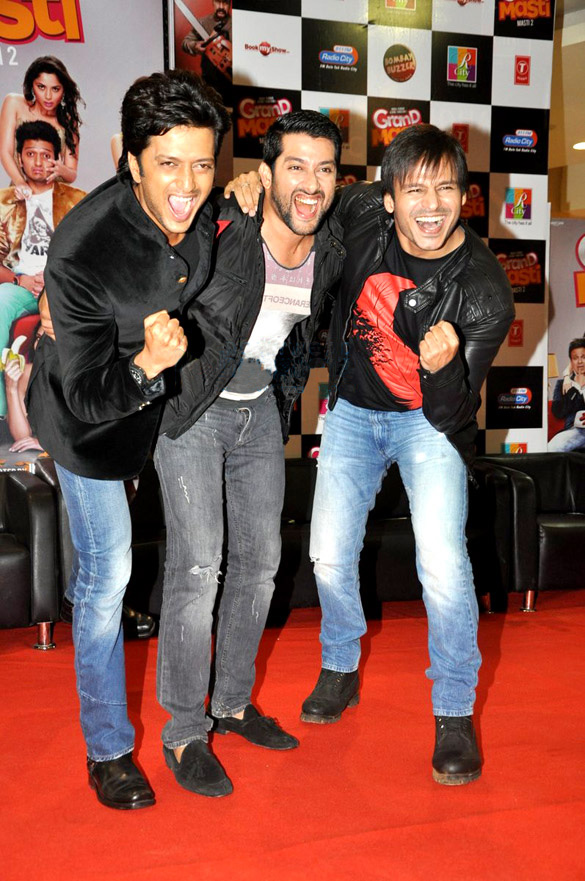
- Riteish Deshmukh, Aftab Shivdasani and Vivek Oberoi, the three leading actors of the series.
- Directed by: Indra Kumar (Masti, Grand Masti, Great Grand Masti); Milap Milan Zaveri (Mastiii 4)
- Written by: Bhavani Iyer (Masti); Milap Zaveri (Grand Masti, Mastiii 4); Tushar Hiranandani (Grand Masti, Great Grand Masti)
- Story by: Indra Kumar
- Produced by: Ashok Thakeria; Ekta Kapoor (Great Grand Masti); A Jhunjhunwala; Shikha Karan Ahluwalia (Mastiii 4)
- Starring: Vivek Oberoi; Aftab Shivdasani; Riteish Deshmukh
- Cinematography: Mazhar Kamran (Masti); Rituraj Narain (Grand Masti); Nigam Bomzan (Great Grand Masti); Sanket Shah (Mastiii 4)
- Edited by: Sanjay Sankla
- Music by: Anand Raj Anand (Masti); Sanjeev–Darshan (Grand Masti, Great Grand Masti, Mastiii 4); Sharab-Toshi; Shaan (Great Grand Masti); Meet Bros (Mastiii 4)
- Production companies: Maruti International; Balaji Motion Pictures (Great Grand Masti, Mastiii 4); Waveband Production; Sri Adhikari Brothers (Mastiii 4)
- Distributed by: SLB Films (Masti); Maruti International (Grand Masti); Balaji Motion Pictures (Great Grand Masti); Zee Studios (Mastiii 4)
- Release dates: 9 April 2004 (1); 13 September 2013 (2); 15 July 2016 (3); 21 November 2025 (4)
- Country: India
- Language: Hindi
- Budget: ₹105 crore
- Box office: ₹220.52 crore

Masti is a series of Indian sex comedy film series. The series is directed by Indra Kumar and produced by Ashok Thakeria. The series stars Vivek Oberoi, Aftab Shivdasani and Riteish Deshmukh in principal roles. The first two movies were a commercial success, but last two movies were box-office bomb.

== Overview ==
=== Masti (2004) ===
Masti revolves around three bachelors, Meet (Vivek Oberoi), Prem (Aftab Shivdasani) and Amar (Riteish Deshmukh). Their lives are good until they get married, and their lives turn to hell. Meet marries Anchal (Amrita Rao), who is obsessively possessive about her husband. Prem marries Geeta (Tara Sharma), who is overly religious, and thus their sex life suffers. Amar marries Bindiya (Genelia D'Souza), who is dominating and lives with her mother (Archana Puran Singh). The friends get together one night and try to think of a way to escape their wives for a while and relive their fun bachelor days. The men set their sights on other women but eventually realise they have all been seeing the same girl, Monica (Lara Dutta). She blackmails them about revealing their affair to their wives for Rs. 1 million.

The terrified men arrive at Monica's car with all the money, only to find her dead. To not be accused, they try to hide her body, interrupted by police officer Sikander (Ajay Devgan), who begins to suspect, and then starts following them. Thereafter, the trio goes to Monica's house for further investigation. Insp. Sikander traces the three who hide at Monica's verandah. The next morning, a mysterious man finds them and reveals that he killed Monica and demands ransom to cover the crime. The trio, guilt-ridden, goes to their respective wives to apologise. But the very next day, the killer traces them and chases them in a car. Unknown to them, they shoot the killer and escape, but end up in jail. After their wives show up, it is revealed that it was just a prank played on them and that Monica is alive, and the killer turns out to be a police officer. The men then apologise to their wives and promise that they'll never have an affair with someone again.

=== Grand Masti (2013) ===
Three friends – Meet (Vivek Oberoi), Prem (Aftab Shivdasani) and Amar (Riteish Deshmukh), who are married and do not like their wives: Meet thinks his wife Unatti (Karishma Tanna) is having an affair with her boss, Prem does not like it when his wife Tulsi (Manjari Fadnis) does not spend quality time with him and Amar hates his marital life because his wife Mamta (Sonalee Kulkarni) is more concerned about their son, Pappu.

One day, the trio received an invitation from their college, SLUTS (Sri Lalchand University of Technology and Science), to attend their college reunion. Their wives do not come with them, so the trio decides to have Grand Masti there to escape their boredom.

When they arrive, they see the women fully clothed and the boys too afraid to express their love for them. This is all due to the fear of Principal Roberts (Pradeep Rawat), who hangs people naked on a tree if they disagree with his rules. They find out that their former colleague, Hardik (Suresh Menon), is in a mental asylum because of the principal. Meanwhile, Prem meets one of his former teachers, Rose (Maryam Zakaria), and is attracted to her. Meet meets Marlow (Kainaat Arora) and is attracted to her. Amar meets Mary (Bruna Abdullah) and is attracted to her. The trio then goes to the girl's place to have sex with them. But just when they were about to do it, they found out that Marlow, Mary, and Rose are relatives of the principal. The principal chases them down, thinking they had sex with Marlow, Mary, and Rose, but they get away as their wives come to spend time with them.

The trio then gets an MMS showing them the footage of them having sex. Luckily, the video does not meet the eyes of their wives. They then find out that it was Hardik who sent them the video, and he blackmails them. Their task is to kill the principal to fulfill Hardik's revenge. They fail in killing him, so they decide to try and delete the videos from Hardik's phone. They succeed and continue to spend their time at the reunion.

It is the last day, and the vengeful principal has put pills inside the soup that attract people to the ones they love. The trio ends up being with the girls, and the principal catches them red-handed. The girls then reveal that the principal is impotent. The trio then gets chased by the principal along with the attracted girls, but then, when the trio ends up on the roof of a building, Hardik pushes the principal, and then, he slides down the roof and hangs on to a bar. The trio tries to save him, but Hardik pushes them too, and they hang onto the principal. The girls come and push Hardik off the roof, and he hangs on to Meet. The trio then tells the principal the truth about not having sex with Marlow, Mary, and Rose. The girls try to make a rope out of their clothes, but the boys fall and end up in the hospital. The trio of wives angrily asks them what exactly happened that night. Principal Roberts calmly replies that due to a misunderstood affair, their husband suffered this consequence. Shortly later, a doctor comes and informs the principal that he is no longer impotent since the blood now properly flows all over his body due to the pressure generated while hanging on the bar. Hardik marries Marlow, and the film ends with Roberts, Hardik, and the trio about to have sex with their respective wives, with everything now going well.

=== Great Grand Masti (2016) ===
The film features three friends, Amar, Meet, and Prem, who always want fun (Masti). The film begins with the title song, where the three friends marry Sapna, Rekha, and Nisha. They are unhappy with their marital lives because of their brother-in-law, sister-in-law, and mother-in-law. Amar's mother-in-law wants her late husband to be reborn, and on the order of a fake spiritual leader, she has stopped her daughter from having any physical relations with Amar for over six months to achieve the rebirth of her late husband. Prem's sister-in-law is attractive but silly; she comes to live with them and wants to sleep with her elder sister, forcing Prem to sleep on the couch away from his wife. Meet's wife is a twin, and whenever he tries to go near his wife, it turns on his brother-in-law (who is a bodybuilder). The connection between the two twins causes great problems, like Meet's wife beating him up unintentionally when her brother is beating a goon up.

One day, they meet in a bar and decide to enjoy their lives. They decide to go to Amar's village to sell off his family's old mansion, and meanwhile, have fun with the beautiful ladies in the village. When they reach the village, they find out that people are scared of the haveli. An old man tells them that there used to be a father daughter duo who lived in the haveli 50 years ago, the daughter, Ragini was very beautiful and many boys were smitten by her beauty but her father never let any guy near her, at the age of 20, Ragini died due to snake bite but her soul still resides in the haveli in search of a man who will have fun with her. The guys laugh it off and proceed towards the haveli, where they meet a very attractive girl who has been living secretly in the haveli, as she is alone and has nowhere to go. The boys hire her as their maid, and each one starts trying to attract her. Soon, it is revealed that she is indeed Ragini, and she informs the boys that one of them must sleep with her to free her soul, and whoever does so will die. The boys get scared and try to escape the mansion, but to no avail. Prem commits to doing so in front of Ragini to buy them some time, and meanwhile, they hire Babu Rangeela, a male prostitute, to sleep with Ragini. But at the last moment, their wives show up, and Ragini turns Babu into a chicken. Ragini makes the boys do weird stuff in front of their wives and in-laws who join them at the haveli, so they would leave. When the boys see that their wives are secretly fasting for them, even when Ragini depicted them as such perverts in front of them, they decide to confront Ragini. They meet Ragini and tell her they will not sleep with her, and she cannot harm them as their wives are fasting for their long lives. Ragini hurts them, but they light fire around her and call her father's spirit to help them. Rather, Babu's spirit comes (who was cooked by the three wives) and does Masti with Ragini, hence satisfying her urge. Babu and Ragini leave the world together, and the three couples live happily ever after.

=== Mastiii 4 (2025) ===
The makers are working on the next, fourth installment of the franchise. The first three installments were directed by Indra Kumar, but according to recent reports, the fourth installment will be helmed by filmmaker Milap Zaveri.

A close source to the development revealed, “Yes, it's true. They are planning to revive the Masti franchise. It is expected to be one of the first of its kind in sex comedies, and the makers are keen on wanting to take it ahead. In fact, the script is ready, and Milap Zaveri has also come on board as the director.” When asked further about the casting, the source added, “Riteish Deshmukh, Vivek Oberoi, and Aftab Shivdasani are aware of this, and they can't wait to reunite. They last came together for this film almost seven years ago. But the makers are currently busy looking for the leading ladies and are yet to finalize on the same”. Mastiii 4 released on 21st November 2025. The teaser of the movie was released on 23rd September.

=== Masti 5 (2028) ===
The makers are working on the next, fifth and final installment of the franchise.

== Cast and characters ==
Character	Film				
Character	Masti (2004)	Grand Masti (2013)	Great Grand Masti (2016)	Mastiii 4 (2025)	Masti 5 (2028)
Inspector Sikander Tyagi	Ajay Devgn				
Meet Mehta	Vivek Oberoi	Vivek Oberoi	Vivek Oberoi	Vivek Oberoi	Vivek Oberoi
Prem Chawla	Aftab Shivdasani	Aftab Shivdasani	Aftab Shivdasani	Aftab Shivdasani	Aftab Shivdasani
Amar Saxena	Riteish Deshmukh	Riteish Deshmukh	Riteish Deshmukh	Riteish Deshmukh	Riteish Deshmukh
Meet's wife	Amrita Rao as Anchal	Karishma Tanna as Unnati	Mishti Chakraborty as Rekha	Shreya Sharma as Aanchal	Amrita Rao as Anchal
Amar's wife	Genelia D'Souza as Bindiya	Sonalee Kulkarni as Mamta	Puja Banerjee as Sapna	Elnaaz Norouzi as Bindiya	Genelia D'Souza as Bindiya
Prem's wife	Tara Sharma as Geeta	Manjari Fadnis as Tulsi	Shraddha Das as Nisha	Ruhi Singh as Geeta	Tara Sharma as Geeta
Hardik/Subramanium	Suresh Menon	Suresh Menon			
Amar's mother-in-law	Archana Puran Singh		Usha Nadkarni		
Monika Singh	Lara Dutta				
Dr. Kapadia	Satish Shah				
Ms. Saxena	Rakhi Sawant				
Killer / Inspector / Blackmailer	Shahbaz Khan				
Rose		Maryam Zakaria			
Mary		Bruna Abdullah			
Marlo		Kainaat Arora			
Robert Pereira		Pradeep Rawat			
Bank Manager		Dino Morea			
Shabari / Ragini			Urvashi Rautela		
Antakshari Baba			Sanjay Mishra		
Prem's sister-in-law			Kangana Sharma		
Meet's brother-in-law			Ketan Karande		
Babu Rangeela			Shreyas Talpade		
Shaniya			Sonali Raut		
Ramsey			Sudesh Lehri		
Ritu			Ghazal Sharma		
Kamraj				Arshad Warsi	
Menka				Nargis Fakhri	
Pablo Putinwa				Tusshar Kapoor	
Sid Walia				Nishant Singh Malkani	
Virat				Shaad Randhawa	
Rosie				Natalia Janoszek	
Rosemary				Tara Sumner	
Cameo Appearance				Genelia Deshmukh	
Cameo Appearance				Saanand Verma	

== Crew ==
Occupation	Film			
Occupation	Masti (2004)	Grand Masti (2013)	Great Grand Masti (2016)	Mastiii 4 (2025)
Director	Indra Kumar	Indra Kumar	Indra Kumar	Milap Zaveri
Producer(s)	Ashok Thakeria	Ashok Thakeria; Indra Kumar	Ashok Thakeria; Ekta Kapoor; Shobha Kapoor	A Jhunjhunwala; Shikha Karan Ahluwalia; Indra Kumar; Ashok Thakeria; Shobha Kapoor; Ekta Kapoor
Writer(s)	Bhavani Iyer; Indra Kumar	Milap Milan Zaveri; Tushar Hiranandani; Indra Kumar	Tushar Hiranandani	Farrukh Dhondy; Milap Milan Zaveri
Composers	Songs: Anand Raaj Anand; Background Score: Sanjay Wandrekar	Songs: Anand Raaj Anand; Sanjeev–Darshan; Background Score: Sanjay Wandrekar	Sanjeev–Darshan; Shaarib-Toshi; Shaan	Songs: Meet Bros; Sanjeev–Darshan; Score: Vishal Shelke
Cinematography	Mazhar Kamran	Rituraj Narain	Nigam Bomzan	Sanket Shah
Editor	Sanjay Sankla	Sanjay Sankla	Sanjay Sankla	Sanjay Sankla
Production Companies	Maruti International	Maruti International	Balaji Motion Pictures; Maruti International; Sri Adhikari Brothers	Balaji Motion Pictures; Waveband Production; Maruti International; Sri Adhikari Brothers

== Release and revenue ==
Film	Release date	Budget	Box office revenue
Masti	9 April 2004	₹12 crore (US$2.65 million)	₹34.14 crore (US$7.53 million)
Grand Masti	13 September 2013	₹34 crore (US$5.8 million)	₹151.24 crore (US$25.81 million)
Great Grand Masti	15 July 2016	₹19 crore (US$2.83 million)	₹20 crore (US$2.98 million)
Mastiii 4	21 November 2025	₹40 crore (equivalent to ₹41 crore or US$4.3 million in 2026)	₹15.14 crore (equivalent to ₹16 crore or US$1.6 million in 2026)
Masti 5	2 April 2028	TBA	TBA
Total		₹105 crore (US$11 million) Four films	₹220.52 crore (US$23 million) Four films
