= Aftab Shivdasani =

Indian actor (born 1978)

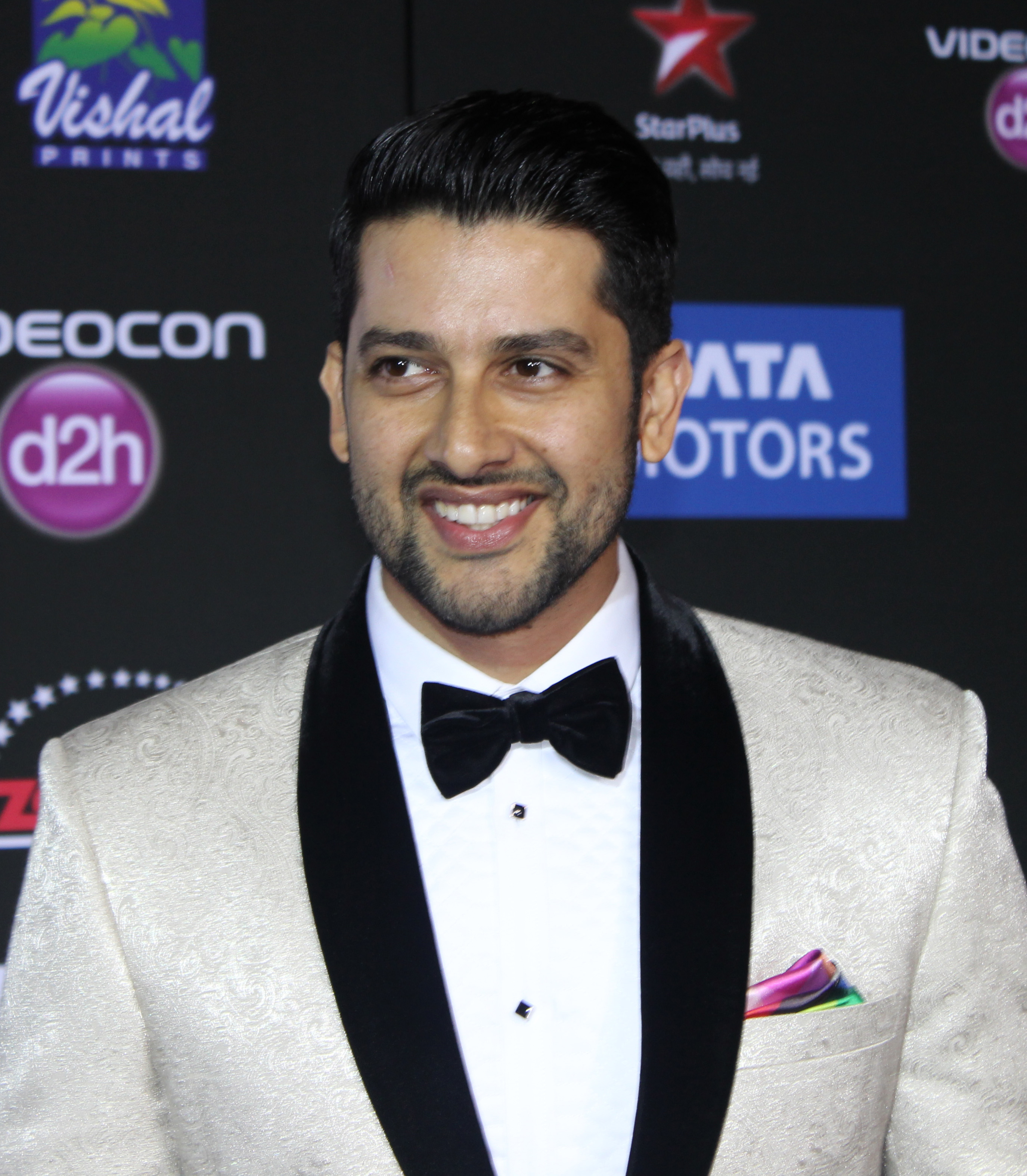
- Shivdasani at IIFA (2014)
- Born: Aftab Prem Shivdasani; 25 June 1978 (age 48); Mumbai, Maharashtra, India
- Education: St. Xavier's High School, H.R. College
- Occupations: Actor; producer; model
- Years active: 1987-present
- Spouse: Nin Dusanj (m. 2014)
- Children: One

Aftab Shivdasani (born 25 June 1978) is an Indian actor, producer and model known for his works in Hindi and also working for Tamil and Kannada film industry. Shivdasani was selected as the Farex baby at the age of 14 months and eventually appeared in many TV commercials for the product. He started his career as a child artist in films like Mr. India (1987), Shahenshah (1988), ChaalBaaz (1989), Awwal Number (1990), C.I.D. (1990) and Insaniyat (1994).

In 1999, he made his adult debut in Ram Gopal Varma's Mast, for which he received the Zee Cine Award for Best Male Debut and Star Screen Award for Most Promising Newcomer- Male. Subsequently, he featured in several commercially successful films, including, Kasoor (2001) for which he received Zee Cine Award for Best Actor in a Negative Role and a nomination for Filmfare Best Villain Award, Kya Yehi Pyaar Hai (2002), Awara Paagal Deewana (2002), Hungama (2003), Masti (2004). His debut film in Tamil cinema was Bhaskar Oru Rascal (2018). He made his debut in Kannada cinema with the commercial hit movie Kotigobba 3 (2021).

== Personal life ==
Aftab Shivdasani was born in Mumbai, Maharashtra to a Hindu Sindhi father, Prem Shivdasani and an Irani Zoroastrian mother, Putli Shivdasani. Shivdasani studied at St. Xavier's High School in Fort and then graduated from H.R. College of Commerce and Economics in Churchgate. In 2012, he got engaged to Nin Dusanj, a London-based Punjabi woman who grew up in London and later moved to Hong Kong, working within the advertising and luxury branding industries in Asia. On 5 June 2014, he married Dusanj at a private ceremony attended only by both their families. They have a daughter, Nevaeh, born in 2020.

== Career ==
=== 1987–1994: Child roles ===
Shivdasani was selected as the Farex baby (baby food brand) at age 14 months and from that point on he appeared in many TV commercials. He made his Bollywood debut as a child actor in Mr. India (1987), then appearing in films such as Awwal Number, Shahenshah, ChaalBaaz and Insaniyat. He also played the child role for Inspector Vijaykumar Srivastav in the 1988 film 'Shahenshah', who would later be played by Amitabh Bachchan for the remainder of the film.

=== 1999–2008: Switch to adult roles and breakthrough ===
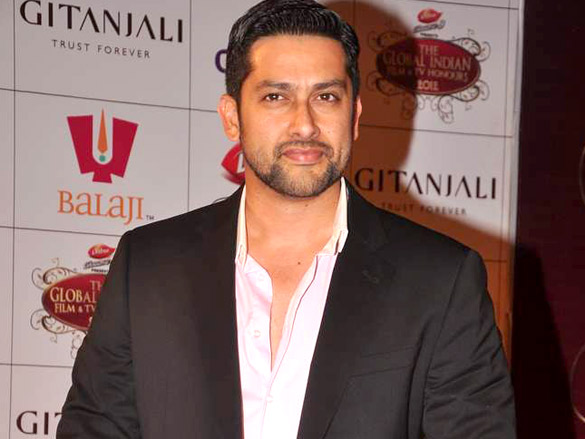
Aftab Shivdasani (2012)

Shivdasani continued appearing in commercials until the age of 19 when he was offered a lead role in director Ram Gopal Varma's Mast opposite Urmila Matondkar while still studying at H.R. College. Shivdasani made his debut as an adult opposite Matondkar in Mast. The film became an instant flop although Shivdasani won the Zee Cine Award for Best Male Debut and the Star Screen Award for Most Promising Newcomer – Male for his performance in Mast. He earned critical acclaim for his performance. Mohammad Ali Ikram of PlanetBollywood.com praised his performance and wrote: "Newcomer Aftab Shivdasani comes across as a bit young and aimless when the movie opens, but as you watch the proceedings, you'll learn that this bit of casting makes perfect sense considering Kittu's immaturity and innocence."

In 2001, Shivdasani made his comeback to acting with his second film, Vikram Bhatt’s Kasoor opposite the debutant Lisa Ray. Shivdasani played a negative role and shot to instant fame with his portrayal of Shekhar Saxena, a well-known journalist, who murders his wife. His performance in the film earned him a nomination for the Filmfare Best Villain Award and a Zee Cine Award for Best Actor in a Negative Role. Taran Adarsh of Bollywood Hungama noticed the improvement in his acting and praised his performance. "Aftab, as the suave publishing magnate, catches you unaware with a performance that is first-rate. His characterisation is dissimilar from the one he played in his debut-making venture Mast. His work should catapult him to the league of genteel artists." His next release of that year saw him paired with Ram Gopal Varma again after Mast in Love Ke Liye Kuch Bhi Karega, in which Shivdasani starred in a supporting role opposite Saif Ali Khan, Fardeen Khan, Twinkle Khanna and Sonali Bendre. Shivdasani's performance was applauded by Taran Adarsh and considered to be better than the other two heroes. Taran Adarsh wrote "Aftab plays to the gallery and gives a good account of himself. Aftab has an edge over the other two heroes because his character is mass appealing. His scenes with Johny Lever are simply superb." However, the film failed at the box office. His last release of the year was Rajiv Rai's Pyaar Ishq Aur Mohabbat, in which Shivdasani played Taj Bharadwaj, one of the three lead roles with the debutant Arjun Rampal and Suniel Shetty opposite Kirti Reddy. Shivdasani was praised by Taran Adarsh. "Aftab Shivdasani has an edge thanks to his lovable characterization. He is natural." Pankaj Shukla of SmasHits wrote "Aftab is impressive as usual and is fast maturing as an actor."

In 2002, Shivdasani's first two films Koi Mere Dil Se Poochhe opposite debutant Esha Deol was a failure but Kya Yehi Pyaar Hai opposite Ameesha Patel was successful at the box office. His third release of that year was Rajkumar Kohli's multi-starrer supernatural horror Jaani Dushman: Ek Anokhi Kahani that was a disaster. His fourth film of 2002 was the multi-starrer action comedy Awara Paagal Deewana, that proved to be a successful movie and became the seventh highest grosser movie of that year. It was an average grosser. His final release of that year was Pyaasa.

Shivdasani had some failures in 2003 with the multi-starrer Darna Mana Hai, which was a commercial failure at the box office but it was critically successful. His role of Purab, a young college student who has the ability to stop and move people, was critically praised. His next release was Priyadarshan's comedy film Hungama opposite Akshaye Khanna and the debutant Rimi Sen, which was his biggest success of that year. His third and final release of that year was Footpath opposite Bipasha Basu, Rahul Dev and debutant Emraan Hashmi, which failed to do well at the box office.

Shivdasani's first two releases of 2004 were Suno Sasurjee opposite Ameesha Patel, and Muskaan opposite Gracy Singh. His third release of that year was Indra Kumar's comedy film Masti, in which he starred opposite Vivek Oberoi, Ritesh Deshmukh, Amrita Rao, Genelia D'Souza, Tara Sharma, Lara Dutta and Ajay Devgan. The film became a hit. His last release of that year was Shukriya: Till Death Do Us Apart opposite Anupam Kher and Shriya Saran.

In 2005, Shivdasani's films included Mr Ya Miss opposite Antara Mali and Koi Aap Sa opposite Anita Hassanandani Reddy and Dipannita Sharma. The former was a flop while the latter was average at the box office. All of Shivdasani's films, especially Ankahee, were failures in 2006. Shivdasani found failures with multi-starrer films in 2007 and 2008.

=== 2009–present: Aao Wish Karein and recent projects ===
In 2009, Shivdasani acted in Aao Wish Karein, the first film produced under his production company, Rising Sun Entertainment. He helped co-write the script and also played the lead character, Mickey. The same year, Shivdasani appeared in Acid Factory. In 2011, Shivdasani played the lead role in the comedy film Bin Bulaye Baraati opposite Priyanka Kothari. Shivdasani's next release was 2012 super-hit 1920: The Evil Returns in which he played the lead role opposite Twinkle Bajpai. His next film Grand Masti, a sequel to the 2004 blockbuster Masti was also a huge success like the original grossing over 100crores at the box office. In January 2016 part 3 of the hit franchise Kyaa Kool Hai Hum was released where Aftab starred alongside Tusshar Kapoor the film was a hit at the box office. In July 2016 the third instalment of the super hit Masti series, Great Grand Masti was released.

In 2021, he took part in a commercially successful Kannada movie, Kotigobba 3, as a police officer. Later that year, Shivdasani starred as Vijay Kumar, a RAW officer in Special Ops 1.5: The Himmat Story, the sequel to Neeraj Panday’s hit series Special Ops on Disney+ Hotstar. His performance received commercial and critical appreciation from all and was also hailed as the surprise package of the second season.

== Awards ==
Year	Nominee / work	Award	Result
2000	Mast	Star Screen Award for Most Promising Newcomer - Male	Won
2000	Mast	Zee Cine Award for Best Male Debut	Won
2002	Kasoor	Filmfare Award for Best Performance in a Negative Role	Nominated
2002	Kasoor	Zee Cine Award for Best Actor in a Negative Role	Won
2002	Kasoor	Screen Weekly Awards for Best Performance in a Negative Role	Nominated
2005	Masti	Bollywood Movie Award for Best Comedian	Won

== Filmography ==
=== As a child actor ===
Year	Film	Role	Notes
1987	Mr. India	Orphan	
1988	Shahenshah	Young Vijay Kumar Srivastava	
1989	ChaalBaaz	Raju & Raja	
1991	Sau Crore	Rakesh	
1990	Awwal Number	Young Sunny	
1990	C.I.D.	Sunny	
1994	Insaniyat	Young Amar Nath Singh	

=== As an adult ===
Year	Film	Role	Notes
1999	Mast	Krishnakant Mathur "Kittu"	
2001	Kasoor	Shekhar Saxena	
2001	Love Ke Liye Kuchh Bhi Karega	Harilal	
2001	Pyaar Ishq Aur Mohabbat	Tajinder "Taj" Bharadwaj	
2002	Koi Mere Dil Se Poochhe	Aman Puri	
2002	Kya Yehi Pyaar Hai	Rahul Tiwari	
2002	Awara Paagal Deewana	Dr. Anmol Acharya	
2002	Jaani Dushman: Ek Anokhi Kahani	Prem Srivastav	
2002	Pyaasa	Suraj Thakur	
2003	Darna Mana Hai	Purav	Story segment: Stop-Move
2003	Hungama	Nandu Apte	
2003	Footpath	Arjun Singh	
2004	Suno Sasurjee	Raj K. Saxena	
2004	Muskaan	Sameer Oberoi	
2004	Masti	Prem Chawla	
2004	Shukriya: Till Death Do Us Apart	Rohan 'Ricky' Verma	
2005	Koi Aap Sa	Rohan	
2005	Deewane Huye Paagal	Raj Sinha	Cameo appearance
2005	Mr Ya Miss	Sanjay Patel	
2006	Shaadi Se Pehle	Rohit Chopra	
2006	Ankahee	Dr. Shekhar Saxena	
2006	Darwaza Bandh Rakho	Ajay 'Balu' Pandit	
2006	Jaane Hoga Kya	Siddharth Sardesai/ Mannu Dada	
2007	Nishabd	Rishi	Cameo appearance
2007	Red: The Dark Side	Neil Oberoi	
2007	Life Mein Kabhie Kabhiee	Manish 'Manu' Gupta	
2007	Speed	Kabir Khan	
2007	Om Shanti Om	Himself	Guest appearance in song Deewangi Deewangi
2007	Dus Kahaniyaan	Aman	Segment - Lovedale
2008	De Taali	Abhishek 'Abhi' Aggarwal	
2008	Money Hai Toh Honey Hai	Gaurav Negi	
2009	Aloo Chaat	Nikhil	
2009	Daddy Cool	Michael	
2009	Kambakkht Ishq	Lucky Shergill	
2009	Acid Factory	Sarthak	
2009	Aao Wish Karein	Adult Mickey V. Mehra	Also Producer
2011	Bin Bulaye Baraati	AD	
2012	Players	Raj	Cameo appearance
2012	1920: The Evil Returns	Jaidev Verma	
2013	Grand Masti	Prem Chawla	
2016	Kyaa Kool Hain Hum 3	Rocky	
2016	Great Grand Masti	Prem Chawla	
2018	Bhaskar Oru Rascal	Sanjay	Tamil Film
2019	Setters	Aaditya	
2021	Kotigobba 3	Sharath	Kannada Film
2025	Mastiii 4	Prem Chawla	
2026	Welcome to the Jungle	Abdullah	

=== Television ===
Year	Title	Role
2020	Poison 2	Aditya Singh Rathore
2021	Special Ops 1.5: The Himmat Story	Vijay Kumar

== See also ==
- List of Indian film actors
