= Tushar Hiranandani =

Indian film writer/Director (Born: 1975)

- Born: 13 July 1975 (age 49); Mumbai, Maharashtra, India
- Occupations: Film director; screenwriter
- Years active: 1999-present
- Spouse: Nidhi Parmar (m. 2011)
- Children: 1

Tushar Hiranandani (born 13 July 1975) is an Indian film director and screenwriter. He has written films like Masti (2004), Atithi Tum Kab Jaoge? (2010), Housefull 2 (2012), ABCD: Any Body Can Dance (2013), Ek Villain (2014), Dishoom (2016) and Half Girlfriend (2017) among others. He then made his directorial debut with Saand Ki Aankh (2019) and went onto make Srikanth (2024). In 2023, he directed Sony LIV series Scam 2003.

== Early life and career ==
He grew up around the world of films as his grandfather Hiranand Hiranandani and father Ashok Hiranandani were Hindi film distributors and had a company called Black and White film distribution. He tasted early success with his debut film Masti directed by Indra Kumar in 2004. He is the head of content development at Balaji Motion Pictures. He also directed the SonyLIV show Scam 2003.

Born in Mumbai, Tushar started out as a clapper boy on the sets of Mann (1999) directed by Indra Kumar. Along with Milap Zaveri, he went on to write films like Kyon Ho Gaya na, Pyaare Mohan and more recently ABCD, Main Tera Hero and Ek Villain. In 2019, Tushar made his directorial debut with the biographical drama Saand Ki Aankh.

== Filmography ==
=== Films ===
Year	Title	Director	Writer	Notes
2004	Masti	No	Yes	
2004	Kyun! Ho Gaya Na...	No	Yes	
2006	Pyare Mohan	No	Yes	
2006	Naksha	No	Yes	
2008	Sunday	No	Yes	
2009	Daddy Cool	No	Yes	
2010	Atithi Tum Kab Jaoge?	No	Yes	
2011	F.A.L.T.U	No	Yes	
2011	Double Dhamaal	No	Yes	
2012	Housefull 2	No	Yes	
2013	Grand Masti	No	Yes	
2013	ABCD	No	Yes	
2014	Main Tera Hero	No	Yes	
2014	Ek Villain	No	Yes	
2015	ABCD 2	No	Yes	
2016	Great Grand Masti	No	Yes	
2016	A Flying Jatt	No	Yes	
2016	Dishoom	No	Yes	
2017	Half Girlfriend	No	Yes	
2019	Saand Ki Aankh	Yes	No	
2019	Housefull 4	No	Yes	
2020	Street Dancer 3D	No	Yes	
2024	Srikanth	Yes	No	

=== Television ===
Year	Title	Director	Writer	Notes
2023	Scam 2003	Yes	No	10 episodes
