= Aamna Sharif =

Indian actress (born 1982)

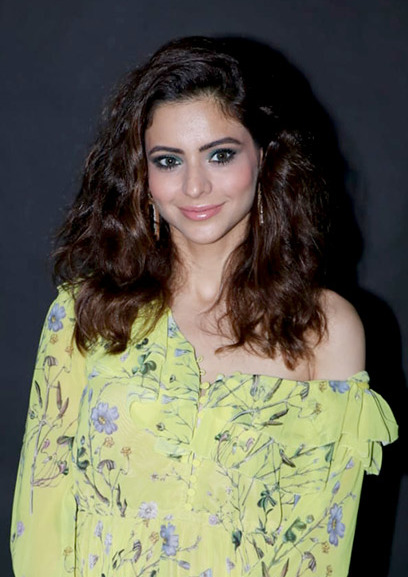
- Sharif in 2018
- Born: 16 July 1982 (age 44); Mumbai, Maharashtra, India
- Occupation: Actress
- Years active: 2001–present
- Known for: "Dil Ka Aalam" (Aashiqui); Kahiin to Hoga; Ek Villain; Kasautii Zindagii Kay 2
- Spouse: Amit Kapoor (m. 2013)
- Children: 1

Aamna Sharif (born 16 July 1982) is an Indian actress who works primarily in Hindi television and films. She is best known for portraying Kashish Sinha in Kahiin to Hoga (2003–2007), Muskaan Mishra in Hongey Judaa Na Hum (2012–2013), and Komolika Chaubey Basu in Kasautii Zindagii Kay 2 (2019–2020).

== Early life and education ==
Aamna Sharif was born on 16 July 1982 in Mumbai, Maharashtra to an Indian father and a Bahraini mother. She studied at St. Anne's High School, Bandra.

== Personal life ==
In 2012, Sharif revealed that she has acrophobia, a fear of heights, which she has had since childhood.

After dating for almost a year, Sharif married film distributor-turned-producer Amit Kapoor on 27 December 2013. The couple have one son, Arain Kapoor, born on 2 September 2015.

Sharif often shares glimpses of her family life on social media, expressing gratitude towards her husband and son. She resides in Mumbai with her family.

== Career ==
During her second year in college, Sharif began receiving offers for modelling various brands. She started her career by featuring in several music videos, which helped her gain early recognition in the entertainment industry.

Sharif made her acting debut in 2003 with the television series Kahiin to Hoga, portraying Kashish Sinha opposite Rajeev Khandelwal. The series, which aired on Star Plus until 2007, was a major success and became one of the most popular Indian television dramas of the early 2000s. Her performance received critical and audience acclaim and earned her several television awards, establishing her as one of the leading actresses on Indian television.

From 2012 to 2013, Sharif portrayed Muskaan Mishra in Sony Entertainment Television's romantic drama Hongey Judaa Na Hum, opposite Raqesh Vashisth. Although the series received mixed reviews, Sharif's portrayal was noted for its emotional depth and maturity.

Sharif made her film debut in 2009 with the romantic comedy Aloo Chaat opposite Aftab Shivdasani. The same year, she appeared alongside Shivdasani again in Aao Wish Karein. In 2014, she appeared in Mohit Suri’s action thriller Ek Villain, portraying Sulochana Khurana, the wife of Riteish Deshmukh’s character. Despite appearing in a few films, Sharif did not achieve significant recognition in cinema and subsequently returned to television.

After a brief hiatus, she returned to television in 2012 with Hongey Judaa Na Hum and later continued to appear in several projects. In 2019, Sharif made her comeback after six years with StarPlus's Kasautii Zindagii Kay, in which she played the antagonist Komolika Basu, replacing Hina Khan. Her portrayal received positive reviews for adding freshness to the popular character.

In 2022, Sharif made her digital debut with the web series Damaged 3, followed by Aadha Ishq opposite Gaurav Arora on Voot. Both performances were well received, and critics noted her successful transition from television to digital platforms.

In addition to acting, Sharif is known for her fashion sense and public appearances. She has been featured in several style and lifestyle publications and continues to endorse brands across fashion and beauty segments.

== Filmography ==
=== Television ===
Year	Title	Role	Notes	Ref.	
2003–2007	Kahiin to Hoga	Kashish Sinha/Kashish Sujal Garewal			
2003	Kasautii Zindagii Kay	Kashish	Guest		
2004	Kumkum – Ek Pyara Sa Bandhan	Kashish	Special appearance	2004	Ana
2005	Kkavyanjali	Kashish	Special appearance		
2006	Karam Apnaa Apnaa	Kashish	Special appearance		
2012–2013	Hongey Judaa Na Hum	Muskaan Duggal			
2013	Ek Thhi Naayka	Razia			
2019–2020	Kasautii Zindagii Kay 2	Komolika Chaubey			

=== Films ===
Year	Title	Role	Notes	Ref.
2002	Jjunction	Jennifer	Tamil Film	
2009	Aloo Chaat	Aamna		
2009	Aao Wish Karein	Mitika		
2011	Shakal Pe Mat Ja	Amina		
2014	Ek Villain	Sulochana		

=== Web series ===
Year	Title	Role	Ref.
2022	Damaged 3	DSP Rashmi Singh	
2022	Aadha Ishq	Roma	

=== Music video appearances ===
Year	Title	Singer	Ref.
2001	"Dil Ka Aalam"	Kumar Sanu	
2002	"Yeh Kisne Jaadu Kiya"	Falguni Pathak	
2002	"Chalne Lagi Hain Hawayein"	Abhijeet Bhattacharya	
2002	"Neendon Mein Khwabon Ka"	Abhijeet Bhattacharya	
2002	"Mujhko Piya Ki Yaad Sataye"	Preeti & Pinky	
2002	"Hasna Kamaal Tera Nachna Kamal"	Shael ft. Aamna Sharif	

== See also ==
- List of Indian television actresses
- List of Hindi television actresses
- List of Indian film actresses
