= Riteish Deshmukh =

Indian actor and filmmaker (born 1978)

Ritesh Deshmukh
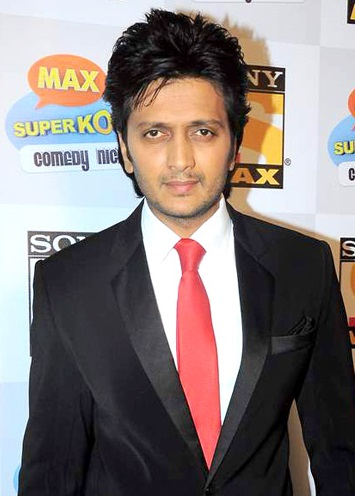
- Deshmukh in 2012
- Born: 17 December 1978 (age 47); Latur, Maharashtra, India
- Occupations: Actor; filmmaker; television presenter
- Years active: 2003–present
- Works: Full list
- Political party: Indian National Congress
- Spouse: Genelia D'Souza (m. 2012)
- Children: 2
- Father: Vilasrao Deshmukh
- Relatives: Amit Deshmukh , Dhiraj Deshmukh (brothers)
- Family: Deshmukh
- Awards: Full list

Riteish Vilasrao Deshmukh (born 17 December 1978) is an Indian actor, filmmaker and television presenter who predominantly works in Hindi and Marathi films. Known for his exceptional ability to perform both serious and comic roles, Deshmukh is a recipient of several accolades including a National Film Award, a Filmfare Award Marathi and five IIFA Awards.

Born to politician and former Chief Minister of Maharashtra, Vilasrao Deshmukh, Deshmukh began his acting career with the film Tujhe Meri Kasam (2003). He has since worked in several successful comedies such as Masti (2004), Kyaa Kool Hai Hum (2005), Bluffmaster! (2005), Malamaal Weekly (2006), Heyy Babyy (2007), Dhamaal (2007), Housefull (2010), Double Dhamaal (2011), Housefull 2 (2012), Kyaa Super Kool Hain Hum (2012), Grand Masti (2013), Housefull 3 (2016), Total Dhamaal (2019), Housefull 4 (2019) and Housefull 5 (2025). He has additionally earned praises for portraying a serial killer in Ek Villain (2014), and a corrupt politician in Raid 2 (2025), both of which were critical and commercial successes.

In Marathi cinema, Deshmukh started off as a producer with Balak-Palak (2013), and had his first acting role in the action film Lai Bhaari (2014). Deshmukh made his directorial debut with Ved (2022). He also portrayed Chattrapati Shivaji in his next Raja Shivaji (2026), both of which are among the highest-grossing Marathi films, latter being the highest-grossing Marathi film of all time.

== Early life and family ==
Deshmukh was born on 17 December 1978 in a Kshatriya Maratha family in Mumbai, to former Chief Minister of Maharashtra, Vilasrao Deshmukh and Vaishali Deshmukh. His elder brother, Amit Deshmukh, is an MLA from Latur City and his younger brother, Dhiraj Deshmukh, was an MLA from Latur Rural, in the Maharashtra Legislative Assembly. His elder sister-in-law Aditi Deshmukh, is an actress and younger sister-in-law Deepshikha Deshmukh is a film producer.

Deshmukh studied at G. D. Somani Memorial School and earned an architectural degree from Kamla Raheja College of Architecture, Mumbai. He later practiced for a year with an overseas architectural firm and continued designing since his return to India. He also studied at the Lee Strasberg Theatre and Film Institute.

== Career ==
=== Breakthrough (2003–2007) ===
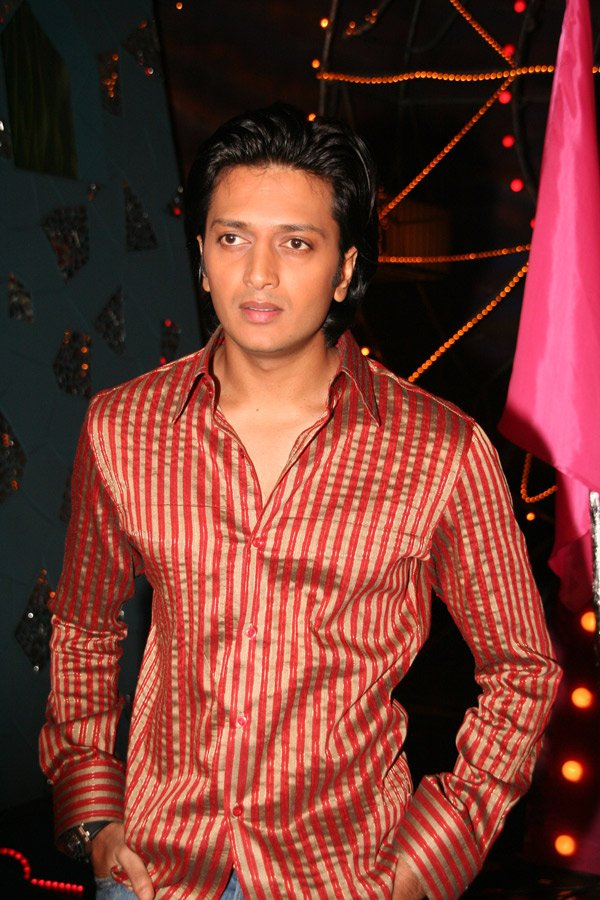
Deshmukh in 2006

Deshmukh made his screen debut with the 2003 romance, Tujhe Meri Kasam opposite Genelia D'Souza. Taran Adarsh noted, "Ritesh is camera friendly, dances well and delivers the right expressions." The film was a commercial success at the box office and earned him a nomination for Screen Award for Best Male Debut. That year, he also appeared in Out of Control.

In 2004, Deshmukh's career marked a turning point with his third film, Masti, where he reunited with Genelia D'Souza. The comedy focuses on 3 close friends who reunite after 3 years, but are now married and are being harassed by their wives, with him playing one of the friend. Manish Gajjar of BBC stated, "Riteish imitating Jim Carrey will bring a smile to your face. He has improved from his film, Out Of Control." The film was a box–office success and earned him the Screen Award for Best Comedian and the Zee Cine Award for Best Actor in a Comic Role. His subsequent releases that year, Bardaasht and Naach, became box-office duds and received mixed reviews.

In 2005, Deshmukh had four releases, of which Home Delivery and Mr Ya Miss failed at the box office, while Bluffmaster! was a semi hit. His only major success that year was, the sex-comedy Kyaa Kool Hain Hum opposite Neha Dhupia, where he played a man who falls in love with a man. Shruti Bhasin of Planet Bollywood opined that Deshmukh "steals the show" with his antics. The film became a surprise success, earned Deshmukh the Stardust Award for Best Supporting Actor and helped him gain a strong foothold in the Hindi films, with his comic roles.

Similarly in 2006, Deshmukh had two box office failures, with Fight Club: Members Only and Darna Zaroori Hai. In Malamaal Weekly, he played an unfortunate assistant to Om Puri. The film was a success at the box office. In his last release of the year, Apna Sapna Money Money, Deshmukh played a conman opposite Koena Mitra, who pretends to be a woman to help his friend. The film emerged a moderate success. Sukanya Verma noted, "The caper rests hugely on Ritesh's shoulders to rake in the laughs. Here, the actor just keeps growing in confidence and talent."

Deshmukh started 2007 with a cameo in Namastey London and Om Shanti Om, both of which was a box office hit. His next release, Cash failed at box office. He then appeared in the comedy Heyy Babyy, co-starring Akshay Kumar and Fardeen Khan, which emerged as the sixth highest-grossing film of the year. He played a kid entertainer, who eventually took care of a child with his two roommates. Khalid Mohamed of Hindustan Times found him to be "reliably likeable". His next release Dhamaal, emerged a major box office success, and saw him play a man who loses his job and finds a hidden treasure along with his friends. Syed Firdaus Ashraf of Rediff.com found him to be "a treat to watch".

=== Career progression (2008–2013) ===
Both of Deshmukh's 2008 releases De Taali and Chamku, performed poorly at the box office. In 2009, his first release was Do Knot Disturb with Govinda, which became an average grosser. He next played the titular role in Aladin opposite Jacqueline Fernandez. Kaveree Bamzai criticised the film but found him to be "sweet". His last two releases, Kal Kisne Dekha and Aao Wish Karein saw him play cameo roles.

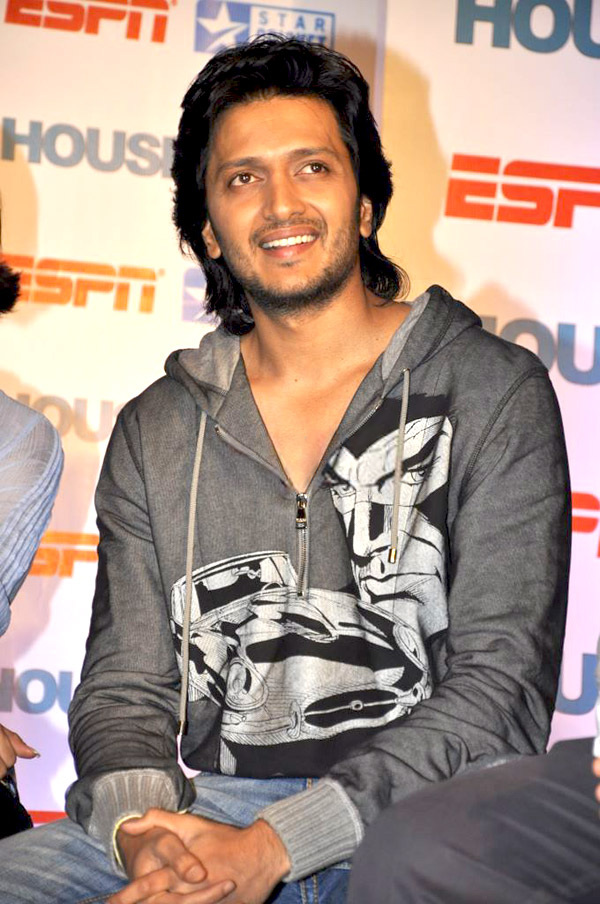
Deshmukh in 2010

Deshmukh's first release of 2010 was Rann, which also premiered at Toronto International Film Festival and saw him play a journalist. Despite positive reviews, it failed at the box office. He then reunited with Jacqueline Fernandez in Jaane Kahan Se Aayi Hai and had a cameo in Jhootha Hi Sahi. Deshmukh next played a Gujarati bartender in the comedy Housefull opposite Lara Dutta. The film grossed over ₹124.50 crore (US$13 million) at the worldwide box office and emerged as the fifth highest-earning film of the year. Komal Nahta stated, "Ritesh is very good. Especially when he pretends to be gay, he brings the house down with laughter." While, Anupama Chopra was appreciative of his chemistry with Akshay Kumar.

Deshmukh's first release of 2011 was F.A.L.T.U, in which he played a fake college principal. It was an average grosser. A critic of The Times of India stated, "Ritesh's character is half-baked and though he is given enough screen-time, his presence remains peripheral to the primary plot." Later the year, he reprised his character in the comic sequel Double Dhamaal, which was a major success at the box office. He also had a cameo in Love Breakups Zindagi, that same year.

The year 2012 saw Deshmukh deliver three box office successes in Tere Naal Love Ho Gaya, Housefull 2, which was his biggest success to date and Kyaa Super Kool Hain Hum. He first played a hard-working simpleton opposite Genelia D'Souza in Tere Naal Love Ho Gaya. A NDTV critic was appreciative of his "earnest, restrained performance" and added that he plays Viren to the hilt. He then starred in the comedy sequel, Housefull 2, where he played an ex-dacoit's son opposite Zareen Khan. The film emerged as the year's eighth highest grosser. His final release that year was the sequel Kyaa Super Kool Hain Hum, where he played a struggling DJ opposite Sarah-Jane Dias. Sonia Chopra of Sify found him to be "effortlessly funny and charming".

In 2013, Deshmukh starred in another sequel, Grand Masti opposite Sonalee Kulkarni and Bruna Abdullah. Despite negative reviews, it emerged as the tenth highest-grossing film of the year. A cameo in Himmatwala was his final appearance of the year.

=== Subsequent success and acclaim (2014–present) ===
Deshmukh started 2014 with a triple role in comedy Humshakals, opposite Bipasha Basu. The film failed at the box office and received negative reviews from critics. Following this, he played a serial killer in the thriller Ek Villain, opposite Aamna Sharif. The film was a box office success and the ninth highest-grossing film of the year and earned him the IIFA Award for Best Supporting Actor. Rajeev Masand stated that Deshmukh springs a surprise and was appreciative of him delivering a "compelling performance". Sweta Kaushal opined that he "steals the show with a stellar performance". He then expanded to Marathi films with Lai Bhaari. and then did a cameo in Entertainment. Lai Bhaari saw him play twin brother and emerged as the seventh highest grossing Marathi film ever. Mihir Bhanage found Deshmukh's Marathi debut "simply astounding".

Deshmukh's only release in 2015, was Bangistan, which was a commercial failure. He started 2016 with the sequel Housefull 3, where he played a car racer opposite Lisa Haydon. It became the seventh highest-grossing film of the year. After two cameos in Kyaa Kool Hain Hum 3 and Mastizaade, he appeared in another sequel Great Grand Masti opposite Puja Banerjee. Unlike the prequels, it failed at box office. His last release of the year was Banjo opposite Nargis Fakhri, where he played a local goon and band member. Tatsam Mukherjee found him to be "pretty entertaining".

Deshmukh then appeared in the 2017 film Bank Chor opposite Rhea Chakraborty, which was a commercial failure. In 2018, he first appeared as himself in Welcome to New York. He then played twin brothers in his second Marathi film Mauli opposite Saiyami Kher. Nandini Ramnath of Scroll.in stated, "Deshmukh, an affable presence whatever the role, is a stretch in the action sequences." It was a box office success.

Deshmukh had two commercial successes in 2019, which broke his box office failure since Housefull 3. He first appeared in the comedy sequel Total Dhamaal, which became a box office success. Ronak Kotecha was appreciative of his comic timing and character. He then played dual characters, one of a classical dancer and other a modern boy in Housefull 4 opposite Pooja Hegde and Kriti Kharbanda. It later became the seventh highest-grossing film of the year and Deshmukh's highest grosser till date. Later the year, Deshmukh played a dwarf goon in Marjaavaan, which became an average grosser and had a cameo in Dream Girl.

Deshmukh had only one release in 2020, in Baaghi 3, where he played a fearful police officer opposite Ankita Lokhande. Despite mixed reviews, it became the second highest-grossing film of the year.

Deshmukh firstly had two cameos in 2022, in Ek Villain Returns and Marathi film Adrushya. This was followed by two streaming films, Plan A Plan B opposite Tamannaah Bhatia, and Mister Mummy opposite Genelia D'Souza. While Mister Mummy received negative reviews, for Plan A Plan B, Archika Khurana took note of Deshmukh's portrayal of the "cynical character". Deshmukh then reunited with D'Souza for the Marathi film Ved, also his debut as a director. He played an ex-cricketer forcibly married to his neighbour and later coaches his ex-lover's daughter. A commercial success, it became the fourth highest-grossing Marathi film of all time. Mayur Sanap opined: "From grief and anger, to frustration and cynicism, Riteish expresses a gamut of emotions in a fine performance." He earned a nomination for Filmfare Award for Best Actor – Marathi.

With no film release in 2023, Deshmukh started 2024 with Kakuda opposite Sonakshi Sinha, playing a ghost hunter. Deepa Gahlot noted, "Riteish plays Victor with such relish that without him, the film would have deflated quickly." He then played a pilot opposite Priya Bapat in Visfot. Devesh Sharma of Filmfare stated, "Deshmukh adds significant depth to Akash, skillfully conveying both vulnerability and inner conflict." These two films were followed by his streaming series debut, with Pill. Deshmukh played a man fighting corruption in Pharma industry. Shubhra Gupta was appreciative of his ordinary man portrayal that made the series engaging.

Deshmukh started 2025 with Raid 2, where he played a corrupt politician. Saibal Chatterjee was appreciative of his "solid performance", but criticised the character. The film was a commercial success at the box office. Deshmukh next played one of the primary character in Housefull 5 opposite Sonam Bajwa and Nargis Fakhri. The film was released in two versions, titled Housefull 5A and Housefull 5B, each featuring a different climax and murderer. Rishabh Suri opined that he "anchors" the film but is let down by weak writing. A commercial success, it emerged as one of the highest-grossing film of the year. In his final release of the year, Deshmukh appeared in the sequel Mastiii 4.

In 2026, Deshmukh directed and act in the Marathi–Hindi bilingual Raja Shivaji, which emerged as the highest-grossing Marathi film of all time. He also has Dhamaal 4 in the pipeline.

== Personal life ==
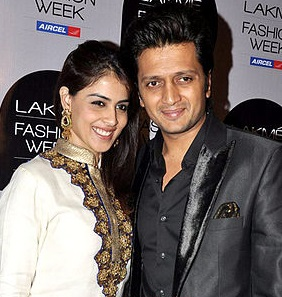
Riteish with his wife, Genelia D'Souza

Tabloids repeatedly linked Deshmukh romantically with Genelia D'Souza, ever since they starred together in their debut film Tujhe Meri Kasam in 2003. They were reportedly ready to get engaged, but Ritesh's father, the then–Maharashtra Chief Minister, Vilasrao Deshmukh did not agree. D'Souza later denied any rumors of a relationship with Deshmukh, and responded that she was just friends with him. However, the couple eventually got married on 3 February 2012, according to Marathi marriage traditions in a Hindu wedding ceremony, and had a Christian wedding in church the next day. The couple's first child, a son named Riaan, was born on 25 November 2014, while their second son, named Rahyl, was born on 2 June 2016.

=== Humanitarian work ===
Deshmukh has donated Rs 2.5 million to his hometown Latur for "Jalyukta Latur", an initiative to provide sufficient water to the parched district after the droughts that Latur faced in April 2016. He along with his wife, Genelia donated Rs 2.5 million towards flood relief in Maharashtra during the 2019 Indian floods. Deshmukh and D'Souza have also pledge to donate their organs. In 2024, People for the Ethical Treatment of Animals (PETA) announced Deshmukh as the "Most Beautiful Vegetarian Men" of the year, owing to his dedication to animal welfare and commitment to a compassionate lifestyle.

== Other ventures ==
=== Television ===
In addition to acting, Deshmukh has turned host for various award functions including International Indian Film Academy Awards, Stardust Awards and Zee Cine Awards. In 2013, he made his television debut as a Judge with the dance show, India's Dancing Superstar. He has co-hosted the talk show Yaaron Ki Baraat and the quiz show Vikta Ka Uttar directed by Ajay Khurpe. In 2024, Deshmukh hosted the reality show Bigg Boss Marathi 5.

Additionally, Deshmukh hosted the web game show Ladies vs Gentlemen with Genelia D'souza. Since 2022, he is seen as the prosecuting lawyer in Case Toh Banta Hai.

=== Producer and director ===
Deshmukh launched his own production house, Mumbai Film Company, in 2013 with the production of the Marathi film Balak Palak, which won several awards. Later in 2014, he produced Yellow, a critical success which won him the National Film Special Jury Award. He then produced another Marathi film Faster Fene, in 2017.

Deshmukh turned director and screenwriter with the 2022 film Ved, which was produced by Genelia. It became the highest grossing Marathi film of 2022 and the third highest-grossing Marathi film of all time. The film earned him MFK Award for Favourite Director along with a nomination for Filmfare Award for Best Director – Marathi. Deshmukh will next direct Raja Shivaji, a film based on Chatrapati Shivaji.

=== Entrepreneur ===
In 2021, Deshmukh turned an entrepreneur and started a plant based meat brand with his wife, named "Imagine Meats".

== In the media ==
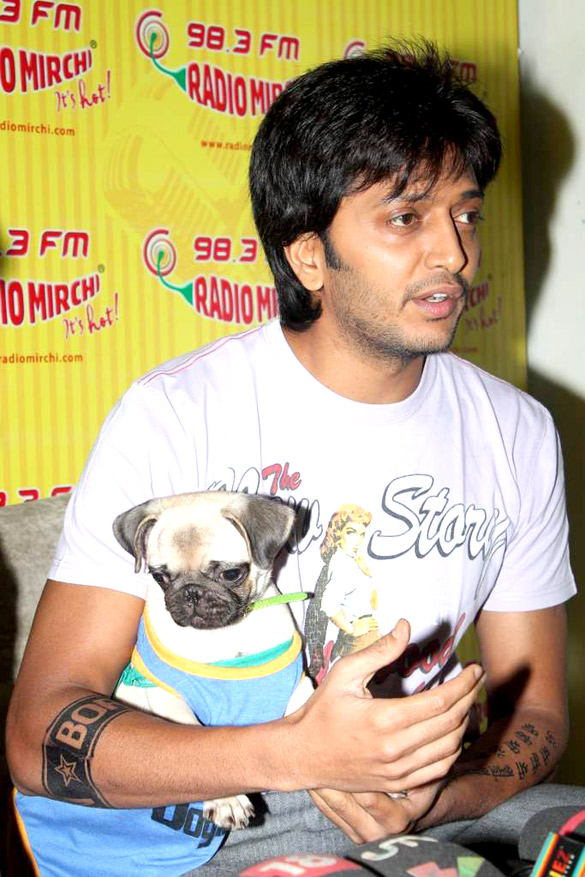
Deshmukh at an event in 2012

Deshmukh appeared on the Forbes India's Celebrity 100 list of 2012. He was placed at the 60th position with an estimated annual income of ₹51 million (US$530,000). In the Times Most Desirable Men list of 2011, Deshmukh was placed 40th, while in Maharashtra's Most Desirable Men list, he was placed 3rd in 2018. Deshmukh is a celebrity endorser for brands and products such as Videocon, TAB Capital, Pokémon Go, Pril Dishwash and Pregakem.

In 2013, he formed a cricket team with Dhiraj Deshmukh, later named Veer Marathi in the Celebrity Cricket League. He played in this league as the captain of his team. The team's brand ambassador was Genelia D'Souza. The team defunct in 2015, after three seasons. Since then, he play as the captain of Mumbai Heroes. Deshmukh maintains ownership in Evolutions, an India-based architectural and interior designing firm. He is also a board member of Mumbai Academy of the Moving Image. Deshmukh is also one of the highest grossing actors of Indian cinema.

== Accolades ==
Deshmukh is a recipient of a National Film Award, the Special Jury Award for Yellow. Deshmukh has won four Maharashtracha Favourite Kon? Awards including two Favourite Actor for Lai Bhaari and Ved. Additionally, he earned the Filmfare Award for Best Male Debut – Marathi for Lai Bhaari.
