= Masti (2004 film) =

2004 Indian film by Indra Kumar

- Theatrical release poster
- Directed by: Indra Kumar
- Written by: Milap Zaveri; Tushar Hiranandani
- Produced by: Ashok Thakeria
- Starring: Ajay Devgn; Vivek Oberoi; Riteish Deshmukh; Aftab Shivdasani; Lara Dutta; Amrita Rao; Tara Sharma; Genelia
- Cinematography: Mazhar Kamran
- Edited by: Sanjay Sankla
- Music by: Songs: Anand Raaj Anand; Background Score: Sanjay Wandrekar
- Production company: Maruti International
- Distributed by: Eros International; Shemaroo Entertainment
- Release date: 9 April 2004
- Running time: 166 minutes
- Country: India
- Language: Hindi
- Budget: ₹12 crore
- Box office: ₹34.14 crore

Masti (English translation: Fun) is a 2004 Indian Hindi-language adult comedy film directed by Indra Kumar, starring Ajay Devgn, Vivek Oberoi, Riteish Deshmukh, Aftab Shivdasani, Lara Dutta, Amrita Rao, Tara Sharma, and Genelia. The film was released in 2004, and received positive responses from critics, and also managed to do well at the box office. The film spawned three sequels, Grand Masti (2013), Great Grand Masti (2016) and Mastiii 4 (2025).

== Plot ==
Masti revolves around three bachelors, Meet, Prem, and Amar. Their lives are carefree until they each marry and become bitter, unsatisfied husbands. Meet marries Anchal, who is obsessively possessive about her husband. Prem marries Geeta, who is overly religious, and thus their sexual life suffers. Amar marries Bindiya, who is the daughter of an equally aggressive and workout junkie mother. Fed up, the men get together one day and plan to reintroduce the fun and excitement into their lives. They set their sights on other women but eventually realize they have all been seeing the same girl, Monica. She blackmails the trio, blackmailing by threatening to expose the affairs to their wives unless they give her Rs. 10 lacs.

Having gathered the money, the terrified men arrive at the drop-off location, only to find Monica dead in her car. They panic and try to hide her body to avoid blame, but are interrupted by police officer Sikander, who is suspicious of them. The trio goes to Monica's house for further investigation, and they hide on Monica's veranda after they realise that Sikander had followed them there. The next morning, a mysterious man finds them and reveals that he killed Monica, demanding a ransom to cover the crime. The guilt-ridden men go to their respective wives to apologise, since they feel like the truth is bound to be revealed. The very next day, the killer pursues the men, resulting in a shootout in which they unintentionally kill the mysterious man. Afterward, they are arrested and imprisoned. Their wives arrive at the jail, and the men emotionally reveal the truth. After some time, the women reveal that the entire situation was set up by them as a prank– Monica is alive, and the 'killer' is an undercover cop. Sikander himself, is actually Bindiya's cousin. The women wanted to teach their husbands a lesson and remind them to be appreciative. The men then apologize to their wives and promise to never do "masti" again.

== Cast ==
- Ajay Devgan as Inspector Sikander Tyagi
- Vivek Oberoi as Meet Mehta
- Aftab Shivdasani as Prem Chawla
- Riteish Deshmukh as Dr. Amar Saxena
- Lara Dutta as Monica Singh
- Genelia D'Souza as Bindiya Saxena
- Amrita Rao as Aanchal Mehta
- Tara Sharma as Geeta Chawla
- Satish Shah as Dr. Suresh Kapadia
- Archana Puran Singh as Mrs. Tyagi, Bindiya & Sikander's mother.
- Rakhi Sawant as Ms. Neha Saxena
- Suresh Menon as Prem's co-worker
- Murali Sharma as a Eunuch at band stand
- Divya Palat as Sheetal
- Aastha Gill
- Dinesh Lamba as Amar's co-worker
- Shahbaz Khan as Inspector Vinayak Bapat

== Soundtrack ==
Masti

Soundtrack album by Anand Raj Anand
- Released: 5 March 2004
- Genre: Feature film soundtrack
- Label: T-Series

The soundtrack of the movie was composed by Anand Raj Anand and the lyrics were penned by Sameer. According to the Indian trade website Box Office India, with around 10,00,000 units sold, this film's soundtrack album was the year's fifteenth highest-selling.

Songs	Singer(s)
"Chain Khuli Ki Main Khuli"	Udit Narayan, Anand Raj Anand, & Shaan
"Chori Chori Chhora Chhori"	Shaan & Sneha Pant
"Dil De Diya Hai"	Anand Raj Anand
"Ek Kunwara Phir Gaya Mara"	Udit Narayan & Abhijeet
"Sayanji Baiyan Chhudake"	Gayatri Iyer, Sneha Pant & Meghna Oberoi

== Reception ==
=== Box office ===
It did very well at the box office, earning around ₹34.14 crore (US$3.6 million) worldwide and was declared a Hit by Box Office India.

=== Critical response ===
Taran Adarsh of IndiaFM gave the film 3.5 stars out of 5, writing, ″On the whole, MASTI has all it takes to appeal to the cinegoers - an impressive star cast, popular music, dollops of comedy and most importantly, sex - not in visuals, but in dialogues and gestures. All these factors combined together will prove advantageous for the film and should take it to the winning post.″ Priya Ganapati of Rediff.com wrote, ″If you like a little spice in your jokes, don't mind gags on homosexuality and are in the mood for some 'non-vegetarian' stuff, then go for it. Masti is guaranteed to give you a few laughs and good 'timepass'.″ Manish Gajjar of BBC.com wrote, ″On the whole, Masti has all the right ingredients to click at the box office. With a great star cast, excellent music and lots of comedy, Masti is a great film to watch this Easter holidays at a cinema near you.″ On the contrary, however, Siddharth Patankar of NDTV described the movie as "three hours of torture," but wrote that Devgan "is effortless and does his mean cop routine very convincingly."

== Sequels ==
Second sequel named Grand Masti was released 9 years later on 13 September 2013. Third sequel Great Grand Masti was released 12 years later on 15 July 2016. Fourth sequel Mastiii 4 was released 21 years later on 21 November 2025.
