= Deewane Huye Paagal =

2005 Indian film by Vikram Bhatt

- Theatrical release poster
- Directed by: Vikram Bhatt
- Screenplay by: Kiran Kotrial
- Dialogues by: Neeraj Vora; Abbas Hirapurwala
- Produced by: Firoz A. Nadiadwala
- Starring: Akshay Kumar; Suniel Shetty; Shahid Kapoor; Rimi Sen; Paresh Rawal; Asrani
- Narrated by: Vivek Oberoi
- Cinematography: Pravin Bhatt
- Edited by: Diwakar P. Bhonsle; Virendra Gharse
- Music by: Anu Malik
- Production company: Base Industries Group
- Distributed by: UTV Motion Pictures
- Release date: 25 November 2005
- Running time: 157 minutes
- Country: India
- Language: Hindi
- Budget: ₹20 crore
- Box office: ₹26.5 crore

Deewane Huye Paagal (transl.: Lovers Gone Mad) is a 2005 Indian Hindi-language romantic action-comedy film directed by Vikram Bhatt and produced by Firoz A. Nadiadwala. The film features an ensemble cast of Akshay Kumar, Suniel Shetty, Shahid Kapoor, Rimi Sen, Paresh Rawal and Johnny Lever. Aftab Shivdasani and Vivek Oberoi make guest appearances. An unofficial remake of the 1998 American film There's Something About Mary with some changes, the film was released on 25 November 2005 to positive reviews from critics.

== Plot ==
Karan is in love with Tanya but is too shy to tell her. After he musters some courage and rescues her stepbrother from some goons, he catches her attention and is eventually able to invite her to a fake birthday party. On her way there, Tanya witnesses the murder of a scientist, Khurana by his evil twin brother, the underworld don Mehboob, and as a result is forced to flee the country to save her own life. The scientist had stored a secret code in a stuffed toy, a parrot, now being sought by Mehboob, and Khurana was able to hide the toy in Tanya's car before being killed. Unaware, Tanya leaves the toy at home before fleeing the country, and the toy is later picked up by Karan, ignorant of Tanya's fate. Karan was crying after Tanya left.

Three years later, still in love with Tanya, Karan learns that Tanya is in Dubai. He enlists the aid of a local hustler and bounty hunter, Rocky.

Rocky travels to Dubai, where his friend Babloo has already tracked down Tanya, who has become Natasha, a successful singer and performer. Rocky and Babloo stakeout Natasha's villa to make sure they are on the right track, but as soon as Rocky spots Natasha, it's love at first sight. While he has Natasha under surveillance, Karan and Murugan arrive at the Dubai airport from India. Faced with a potential competitor to woo Natasha, Rocky attempts to eliminate Karan from the picture by lying to him about Tanya. Karan is heartbroken and decides to go back to Mumbai. He is about to board his flight, when at the last moment, he spots a picture of Tanya as Natasha on a club advertisement. He is overjoyed and assumes that Rocky made a mistake.

Though, there were two other people who were having feelings for Natasha. Local plumber, Sanju Malvani has been currying favours for Natasha by pretending to be a paraplegic on crutches. Every time Natasha meets someone she likes, Sanju eliminates the competitor using a unique trick. He edits and prints out a fake newspaper featuring an article showing that person as a crook and comes over to Natasha and shares "the news" with her while acting all shocked himself. Also, there is Tanya's physically disabled live-in friend Tommy, who also has a soft spot for her. Having heard of the death of Tanya's disabled brother, Tommy has since faked being run over in a car accident and now acts like he himself is disabled and mentally challenged.

Nonetheless, Rocky begins his attempted seduction of Natasha while pretending to be an architect. Natasha is ambushed in the parking lot by some thugs (who were hired by Rocky). Rocky intervenes, and after beating them, introduces himself to Natasha, and proceeds to show himself off as a charming professional with a heart of gold. Surprised, Natasha offers Rocky an invitation for tea later in the evening, which he accepts.

Later Rocky is confronted by several obstacles, Natasha's aunt Sweety, the jealous Tommy, and the family's pet dog. The parties depart to Natasha's latest album at a social event, where Rocky now comes face to face with Sanjay "Sanju" Malwani, who is also pretending to be an architect.

With Natasha and company under surveillance, Rocky now intercepts Sanju trying to discredit him at Natasha's home. Later, when the shocked Natasha confronts Rocky about him being an alleged impostor, Rocky is able to convince Natasha that he is actually a captain on a ship. Tommy, however, behaves in a somewhat jealous manner. He accuses Rocky of biting him. A food bill from a bar drops out of Tommy's pocket during his supposed accusation. This arouses Rocky's suspicions about his supposed "condition".

Rocky and Babloo track down Tommy at a local disco. Rocky confronts Tommy while he is on the disco floor and threatens to expose him in front of Natasha. At the end, Rocky lets Tommy go on the condition that the latter will no longer attempt to get in his way of seducing Natasha.

Rocky has invited Natasha over for a cruise. Natasha spots Karan and Murugan sitting at the grounds. She introduces Karan to Rocky. Karan on seeing Rocky and Natasha happy wants to leave them alone out of his love for Tanya. While he tries to leave, Natasha convinces Karan to stay one more night in Dubai and come over for dinner later in the day.

Sanju shows up later at the party and pulls Natasha aside to reveal his latest newspaper creation, showing Rocky as an international crook, murderer and serial killer, whose modus operandi is to trap and seduce innocent girls like Natasha and then destroy their lives. Rocky overhears the conversation and while Natasha is occupied elsewhere, chases Sanju outside. Later, Rocky, Sanju and Tommy are seen sitting in a bar nearby after a confrontation, exposing each other as fraudsters and having a drink together, cursing their luck at the emergence of Karan as the new love in Natasha's life.

The next day, Karan goes to Natasha's house to propose to her and finds that she has been sent an anonymous letter, informing her that he indeed had hired Rocky to follow her. In a spate of anger, she sends him out of the house. He goes to Rocky's house to confront him about this and finds Sanju and Tommy there as well. Meanwhile, Mehboob and his family, including Sunny, (his illegitimate son, who has also been obsessed with Tanya since college) arrive at Natasha's house and interrogate her about the stuffed toy. Realising that his father had used his obsession to track down Natasha, Sunny turns on his father and kidnaps her. Sweety informs Sanju about this, and he, along with Rocky, Karan and Tommy follow them after having gotten directions from Murugan, who happened to see them from a taxi. It is revealed that the code to a vault is what Mehboob was searching for. The vault had carried a secret solution, two drops of which could decrease a person's age by 25 years.

Rocky intervenes and cleverly destroys the toy after having it speak the code into Natasha's ear. A gunfight ensues, during which Natasha discovers Tommy and Sanju's deceit. Baljeet kidnaps Natasha. Rocky and Sanju follow them on bikes and manage to catch up with them. After thrashing all the men, they take Natasha to her house where a further argument ensues as to who should be more worthy of Natasha. The argument ends when Karan arrives with Raj Sinha and tells Natasha about Sanju's newspaper scams, one of which had exposed Raj as a drug dealer and addict earlier. Raj and Natasha are reunited. Wishing them luck, Karan leaves.

Natasha realises her love for Karan and stops him as he is leaving, saying that she and Raj had had no future ever since their earlier break up. She then accepts and reciprocates his love and they finally unite. This tearful union is once again being witnessed by a grumbling Rocky, Sanju and Tommy along with Sunny.

At the end, the narrator says that after all the effort he had undertaken to acquire the solution, Mehboob had become too overexcited and had consumed the whole quantity instead of two drops. He had ended up becoming a baby and Sunny unwittingly became his father. The film ends as the narrator requests the audience not to forget him.

== Cast ==
- Akshay Kumar as Ranbir "Rocky" Hiranandani
- Suniel Shetty as Sanjay "Sanju" Malwani
- Shahid Kapoor as Karan Sharma
- Rimi Sen as Tanya Mulchandani / Natasha
- Paresh Rawal as Tommy Lalwani
- Johnny Lever as Murugan Subramanyam
- Vijay Raaz as Babloo Pandey
- Om Puri as Scientist Narendra Khurana / Mehboob Khurana
- Suresh Menon as Veerappan "Sunny" Khurana
- Baljeet Singh as Baljeet Khurana
- Supriya Pilgaonkar as Sweety Tyrewala Aunty
- Asrani as the Blind Man
- Leena as Kavita Agnihotri
- Pawan Shankar as Sanjay Kapur
- Payal Rohatgi as Sanjana Chatterjee
- Vivek Oberoi as Narrator (Cupid)
- Aftab Shivdasani as Rajeev "Raj" Sinha (special appearance)
- Rakesh Bedi as Gullu Mulchandani
- Snehal Dabi as Kutti Anna
- Kabir Bedi as Kabir, Khurana's secretary

== Soundtrack ==
Deewane Huye Paagal

Soundtrack album by Anu Malik
- Released: 15 October 2005
- Genre: Feature film soundtrack
- Label: T-Series

The music for all the songs were composed by Anu Malik with the lyrics written by Sameer.

#	Title	Singer(s)	Duration
1	"Maar Sutiye"	Anu Malik	05:50
2	"Meri Jaane Jigar"	Anu Malik	05:44
3	"Tu Hai Tu Hai"	Shaan, Sunidhi Chauhan, Abrar ul Haq	06:16
4	"Sutradhar - I"	Anu Malik	08:56
5	"Chakle Chakle"	Anu Malik	05:01
6	"Aisi Umar Main"	Shaan, Kunal Ganjawala, Krishna Beura	11:34
7	"Chakle Chakle (Remix)"	Anu Malik	04:11
8	"Sutradhar - II"	Anu Malik	01:57
