= Suno Sasurjee =

- Directed by: Vimal Kumar
- Written by: Rajeev Kaul
- Produced by: Vimal Kumar
- Starring: Aftab Shivdasani; Ameesha Patel
- Cinematography: Damodar Naidu
- Edited by: Prakash Dave
- Music by: Sanjeev–Darshan
- Release date: 27 February 2004
- Running time: 169 minutes
- Country: India
- Language: Hindi

Suno Sasurjee (Translation: Listen Father-in-law) is an Indian Hindi-language romantic comedy film directed by Vimal Kumar. The film stars Aftab Shivdasani and Ameesha Patel. The film also features Kader Khan, Gulshan Grover and Asrani in supporting roles.

== Synopsis ==
Mr. Raj K. Saxena is known for his parsimony. Everything he does and thinks is valued with money, and the ways he can accumulate it. His daughter, Kiran, is the opposite, a spendthrift. Mr. Saxena borrows money from elderly people, assuring them that they will return the loan with a handsome interest rate after about 20 years, knowing fully well that none of them will survive 20 years. Then he meets with the son of one of such lenders, aptly named after him, viz. Raj K. Saxena. Mr. Saxena refuses to repay the amount, swallows the proof, the only evidence, and asks Raj to get out, which he does. Raj is determined to get his money and wants Kiran to fall in love with him. Kiran does so and brings him over to introduce him to her shocked and speechless dad. Things change when Raj inherits a large amount of money, ironically left by Mr. Saxena's maternal grandmother, and it is Mr. Saxena who is now anxious to get in the good books of Raj, with hilarious results.

== Cast ==
- Aftab Shivdasani as Raj Saxena
- Ameesha Patel as Kiran Saxena
- Gulshan Grover as Shera Aflatoon
- Kader Khan as Raj K. Saxena / Kiran Kumar (Dual Role)
- Asrani as Murli Shergill
- Shakti Kapoor as Pratap Vidyarthi, Kiran's brother in law
- Kiradaas as Danny's Cousin-in-Law
- Kunickaa Sadanand as Mrs Kiran Kumar
- Mushtaq Khan as Principal Parvez
- Achala Sachdev as Mrs Gunkaari
- Tej Sapru as Goga Kapoor, Shera's younger brother

== Soundtrack ==
All music is composed by Sanjeev–Darshan

Songs
No.	Title	Playback	Length
1.	"Aa Jaa"	Jaspinder Narula
2.	"Aap Kaha Rehte Hain (Deleted Song)"	Abhijeet, Alka Yagnik
3.	"Jab Dil Dhadakta"	Kumar Sanu, Alka Yagnik
4.	"Kardo Kardo Shaadi Sasurjee"	Sonu Nigam, Vinod Rathod, Arshad, Sapna Mukherjee
5.	"Mera Dil Chura Ke"	Kumar Sanu, Prabha
6.	"Saason Se Saasein"	Babul Supriyo, Hema Sardesai
7.	"Tota Mirchi"	Sonu Nigam, Alka Yagnik

== Critical response ==
Taran Adarsh of Bollywood Hungama gave the film 1 star out of 5, writing: "On the whole, SUNO SASURJEE is a stale product with dim chances."
