= Mastizaade =

2016 Indian film by Milap Zaveri

- Theatrical release poster
- Directed by: Milap Zaveri
- Written by: Mushtaq Sheikh; Milap Zaveri
- Produced by: Pritish Nandy; Rangita Pritish Nandy
- Starring: Sunny Leone; Tusshar Kapoor; Vir Das; Suresh Menon; Shaad Randhawa; Vandita Shrivastava
- Cinematography: Sanjay F. Gupta
- Edited by: Nitin Rokade
- Music by: Songs: Meet Bros Anjjan; Amaal Mallik; Anand Raj Anand; Score: Sanjoy Chowdhury
- Production company: PNC Productions
- Distributed by: Panorama Studios; Pen Studios (India) Eros International (Overseas)
- Release date: 29 January 2016
- Running time: 107 minutes
- Country: India
- Language: Hindi
- Budget: ₹ 300 million
- Box office: est. ₹ 364.4 million

Mastizaade (transl. Fun seekers) is a 2016 Indian Hindi-language sex comedy film, directed by Milap Zaveri and produced by Pritish Nandy and Rangita Nandy. The film stars Sunny Leone in a dual role alongside Tushar Kapoor and Vir Das in lead roles with Shaad Randhawa, Suresh Menon, Vandita Shrivastava and Vivek Vaswani in supporting roles while Ritesh Deshmukh appeared in a cameo. The film was released worldwide on 29 January 2016.

== Plot ==
Sunny Kele and Aditya Chothia are best friends who want to learn how to be successful in their sexual lives. They meet a friend who recalls how he helped an old lady who asked him to stay over as it was raining. The next day, he woke up to find an attractive girl named Bunty, and he apparently had sex with her. He encourages his friends to do the same.

Two years later, Sunny and Aditya participate in a sex-addict rehab where they present their presentation and later have sex with two girls after arousing them. Their colleague is impressed, and they reveal that they have chicks-ray, which allows them to see through women's clothes and show it by telling the color of the lingerie the three girls were wearing. Laila Lele and Lily Lele are very attractive twins. Laila after a shower, walks around naked in her house and then dresses up as her neighbour appears at the door, aroused by her. They are fired from their company when they present an ad for a soft drink, Gol Goti Soda, where they showcase a boy wishing to enlarge a girl's breasts. The two then meet Laila Lele and Lily Lele.

Soon, Sunny falls in love with Laila and Aditya falls in love with Lily. They participate in a sex addiction prevention event held by the twins, where Laila strips to test the men's erection. Everyone fails except Aditya who erects after getting touched by Lily. To his disappointment, he finds that Lily has a boyfriend named Deshpremi. They both win a chance to go on a trip with Laila and Lily where they meet their strict father, sex-addict mother, and a gay brother, Das who is after Sunny. In a series of comedic events, which leads to a climactic chase where Sunny, Aditya, Laila and Lily try to evade their family. They accidentally find themselves stuck in a rat glue factory, and the conveyor belt leads them towards a cutter. While fighting each other, Lily falls on the machine and gets stuck, and Aditya frees her while stripping her to her underwear in the process. Sunny explains that in order to protect themselves, they need to strip down their clothes to create a rope that can reach the lever and shut it down. They all strip to underwear and succeed. The father forgives Aditya and Sunny and they happily marry their loved ones. After their marriage, Laila puts a coin on Sunny again, performs a seductive dance, and rips her saree to reveal her pink bra, which causes Sunny an erection and sends the coin flying above to the upper floor.

== Cast ==
- Tusshar Kapoor as Sunil 'Sunny' Kele - A man who is a sex addict and falls in love with Laila Lele. It is shown that he can see through a woman's dress except Laila.
- Vir Das as Aditya Chothia - A sex addict who falls in love with Lily Lele. It is shown that he can see through a woman's dress except Lily.
- Sunny Leone as Lily Lele and Laila Lele (dual roles).Laila and Lily are extremely attractive twins who run a sex-addict clinic and fall in love with the men. Lily has a speech impediment.
- Suresh Menon as Das
- Shaad Randhawa as Deshpremee Singh/Deshdrohi (dual roles)
- Asrani as Urashit
- Sushmita Mukherjee as Seema Lele
- Vivek Vaswani
- Gizele Thakral as Titli Boobna, the assistant bank manager
- Vandita Shrivastava as Transgender girl
- Kurush Deboo
- Kanwalpreet Singh
- Bruna Abdullah as Bunty (Special appearance)
- Ritesh Deshmukh as Deep(Love Guru) (Extended cameo appearance)
- Milap Zaveri (Cameo appearance)

== Production ==
Principal photography commenced on 7 September 2014 and was completed by December 2014. It was shot at various locations in Thailand and India. The film was initially slated to release on 1 May 2015, but it was held back for almost six months by the Censor Board owing to its sexual content. On 13 August 2015, the Central Board of Film Certification finally granted the censor certificate to the film. It was subsequently released on 29 January 2016.

== Soundtrack ==
Mastizaade

Soundtrack album by Meet Bros Anjjan, Amaal Mallik and Anand Raj Anand
- Released: 29 December 2015
- Genre: Feature film soundtrack
- Length: 20:21
- Language: Hindi
- Label: T-Series

The music for Mastizaade is composed by Meet Bros Anjjan, Amaal Mallik, and Anand Raj Anand. Sanjoy Chowdhury composed the background score for the film. The lyrics were written by Kumaar, Anand Raj Anand and Manoj Muntashir. The popular song "Baby Doll", which was pictured Sunny Leone from the movie Ragini MMS 2 has been recreated and used in the film.
The first song "Rom Rom Romantic" was released on 28 December 2015 on official T-Series YouTube channel. The second song "Hor Nach" was released on 6 January 2016. The third song "Dekhega Raja Trailer" was released on 13 January 2016. The title song of movie was released on 19 January 2016. The song "Kamina Hai Dil" was released on 26 January 2016. The full music album was released on 29 December 2015 by T-Series.

No.	Title	Lyrics	Music	Singer(s)	Length
1.	"Rom Rom Romantic"	Manoj Muntashir	Amaal Mallik	Mika Singh, Armaan Malik	04:30
2.	"Hor Nach"	Kumaar	Meet Bros Anjjan	Ritu Pathak, Meet Bros Anjjan	03:43
3.	"Dekhega Raja Trailer"	Anand Raj Anand	Anand Raj Anand	Nakash Aziz, Neha Kakkar	03:48
4.	"Mastizaade"	Kumaar	Meet Bros Anjjan	Meet Bros Anjjan	04:21
5.	"Kamina Hai Dil"	Kumaar	Meet Bros Anjjan	Benny Dayal, Meet Bros Anjjan	03:59
Total length:					20:21

== Reception ==
=== Critical response ===
Times of India rated this film 1/5 stars and said "Mastizaade is a result of fractured script". Indian Express stated that "there are barely two and a half laughs in Sunny Leone's film". The Hindu stated "Would you call this a film?". Sarita A. Tanwar of DNAIndia rated the film 2 stars and stated "A feast for Sunny Leone's fans, Mastizaade is shocking and scandalous".

=== Box office ===
The film's total lifetime collection is 38.44 crore.

=== Controversies ===
On 3 February 2016, protests flared in the Punjab city of Ludhiana, disrupting the screening and calling for the ban of this film. The protests were staged by the Hindu Nyay Peeth. Also, on 10 February 2016, an FIR against Sunny Leone and Vir Das was registered in the Adarsh Nagar Police Station in Delhi. The complaint was about the film hurting religious sentiments in the way that supposedly depicted promoting the use of a condom inside a temple. That same day, a complaint was filed with the National Human Rights Commission (NHRC) and the Central Board of Film Certification (CBFC) seeking a ban on the movie. It was based on the movie allegedly 'diminishing the dignity of wives and mothers of the Army men on duty.'
