= Sanjeev–Darshan =

Sanjeev Darshan
- Genres: 90's Classics, Filmi, Dance, Electro-Pop
- Occupations: Composer, film score, singer
- Years active: 1999–present

Sanjeev–Darshan is a film song composer duo in the Bollywood film industry of India. The duo derives its name from the first names of its two principals, Sanjeev Rathod and Darshan Rathod. Sanjeev and Darshan are the sons of the Hindi film song composer Shravan Rathod, who himself paired with music director Nadeem as all-time great music director duo Nadeem-Shravan. Their first released soundtrack was for the 1999 film Mann.

== Early life ==
Sanjeev and Darshan are the sons of music director Shravan Rathod, one half of the composer duo Nadeem–Shravan. Sanjeev received formal training in Indian classical music under Pandit Kallika Prasad, while Darshan is largely self-taught and learned to play several musical instruments independently.

They were born into a family with a strong musical background. Their grandfather, Pandit Chhaturbhuj Rathod, was associated with the promotion of classical and semi-classical music. Their paternal uncles are singer Vinod Rathod and singer-composer Roop Kumar Rathod.

== Music career ==
Sanjeev–Darshan made their debut as music directors for a film by Mahendra Shah and Vimal Kumar which was never released. In 1998, they composed a Gujarati album for the Shree Swaminarayan Gadi Sansthan. Their first film album was Yeh Raaste Hain Pyaar Ke, which was released in 1998; however, the film was released 3 years later. Indra Kumar had been with the duo at their initial recording and he went on to compose around forty tunes with them. In 1999, he invited them to compose music for his film Mann, starring Aamir Khan and Manisha Koirala . The film was an average success but its songs became hugely popular. All the songs of Mann were copied from other popular hits, a Malaysian singer also filed a case against them for copying his song, and then Iwan won the case later. "Nasha ye pyar ka nasha hain" song copied from Toto Cutungo's "l'italiano" song.

== Discography ==
Year	Film	Notes
1999	Mann	
2000	Deewane	
2000	Hamara Dil Aapke Paas Hai	
2000	Khiladi 420	
2001	Aashiq	
2001	Yeh Raaste Hain Pyaar Ke	
2001	Style	
2002	Kitne Door Kitne Paas	
2002	Pyaasa	
2002	Rishtey	
2002	Karz	
2003	Talaash	
2003	Parwana	
2003	Xcuse Me	
2003	Aanch	
2004	Suno Sasurjee	
2005	Fun – Can Be Dangerous Sometimes	
2009	Kaashh....Mere Hote	
2010	Unakkaga En Kadhal	Tamil film
2011	U R My Jaan	
2013	Grand Masti	
2013	Satya 2	
2014	Super Nani	
2015	Dirty Politics	
2015	NH10	
2015	Main Aur Charles	
2016	Great Grand Masti	
2016	Beiimaan Love	
2016	Ishq Junoon	
2017	Shaadi Abhi Baaki Hai	
2018	Yamla Pagla Deewana: Phir Se	
2018	Bhaiaji Superhit	
2019	Amavas	
2019	V For Viktor	
2019	Ghost	
2025	Badass Ravikumar	One song "Barsaat"
2025	"Mastiii 4"	
