= Mr Ya Miss =

2005 Indian film by Antara Mali

- Directed by: Antara Mali; Satchit Puranik
- Written by: Raghuveer Shekhawat (dialogues)
- Screenplay by: Antara Mali
- Story by: Antara Mali
- Based on: Switch by Blake Edwards
- Produced by: Ram Gopal Varma; Sunil Chainani; Sameer Chanda (credited as Sameer Srivastava)
- Starring: Antara Mali; Aftab Shivdasani; Riteish Deshmukh (credited as Ritiesh Deshmukh)
- Cinematography: John Wilmor; Samir Sarkar
- Edited by: Vivek Shah
- Music by: Amar Mohile
- Production companies: RGV Film Company; Horseshoe Pictures
- Release date: 2 December 2005 (India)
- Running time: 136 minutes
- Country: India
- Language: Hindi

Mr Ya Miss (transl. Mr or Miss) is a 2005 Indian Hindi-language body swap, comedy film written and directed by Antara Mali. Also starring herself along with Ritesh Deshmukh, Aftab Shivdasani and Divya Dutta.

== Plot ==
The movie deals with a wealthy Gujarati-speaking Sanjay Patel, a self-styled Indian casanova who believes in dating and flirting with a lot of women and breaking their hearts. He works as an executive in an advertising firm and is very friendly with a male co-worker, Shekhar, who is exactly Sanjay's opposite when it comes to women. Sanjay's flirtatious actions land him in trouble with three women, Loveleen, Seema, and Rita, where he is accidentally killed by Loveleen.

After his death, he appears before Lord Shiva and Goddess Parvati and requests that they let him return to earth. They give him a last chance to mend his ways and behaviour with women before the next Shivaratri. Sanjay returns to earth, but the next day he treats this as a bad dream and sets about his usual way. This does not auger well with Parvati, and she recommends to Lord Shiva that Sanjay's gender be changed to female in order to enable him to understand and appreciate women.

The transformation occurs, and Sanjay, much to his horror, is transformed into a woman. He changes his name to Sanjana, introduces himself as Sanjay's stepsister, and makes others believe that Sanjay will return after Shivaratri. Sanjana goes to Loveleen, convinces her of her real identity as Sanjay, and persuades her to give her lessons in being a woman. While working in the company, Sanjana faces much catcalling and harassment, thus making her feel the pain of a woman. She has several problems as the things she used to do with other girls, like flirting, are being done to her.

One day, after a bar fight, a drunk Sanjana and Shekhar spent a night together. In the morning, Sanjana has no memory of the encounter and accuses Shekhar of raping her while she was passed out. Soon, Sanjana finds herself pregnant with his child. Sanjay's dead body is found and identified by both Sanjana and Shekhar. Sanjana is arrested by the police in Sanjay's murder case.

She finally reveals in front of Shekhar about being Sanjay. Slowly, while leading a woman's life, Sanjana understands the error of her ways as a man. With Shekhar's help, Sanjana is proven innocent, and Loveleen is arrested for murdering Sanjay. At home, Sanjay wakes up from his sleep, and these events turn out to be his bad dream. He then mends his ways and starts avoiding women.

== Cast ==
- Antara Mali as Sanjana Patel
- Aftab Shivdasani as Sanjay Patel
- Riteish Deshmukh as Shekhar Jaiswal
- Rushad Rana as Ravi Prasad
- Dinesh Lamba as Tiwari Shankar
- Anangsha as Rita Kasliwal
- Kainaaz Pervees as Seema Das
- Faezeh Jalali as Suzy Bahl
- Divya Dutta as Loveleen
- Khursheet Chehar as Lawyer
- Ajinkya Deo as Lord Shiva (Guest appearance)
- Varsha Usgoankar as Parvati (Guest appearance)

== Soundtrack ==
The soundtrack album consists of four tracks written (lyrics and composition) by Nitin Raikwar while Kanha Kanha song's lyrics are written by Satchit Puranik (also director of the film) and composed by Ronkini Sharma and Zoeb Khan.

Mr Ya Miss

Soundtrack album by Nitin Raikwar, Ronkini Sharma and Zoeb Khan
- Released: November 22, 2005
- Recorded: 2005
- Genre: Film soundtrack
- Length: 24:09
- Language: Hindi
- Label: T-Series; Super Cassettes Industries Pvt. Ltd.

Track listing
No.	Title	Lyrics	Music	Singer(s)	Length
1.	"Fakra Hai - Aadmi"	Nitin Raikwar	Nitin Raikwar	Sonu Nigam	3:44
2.	"Kamsin Kali Dil Ki Gali"	Nitin Raikwar	Nitin Raikwar	Vinod Rathod, Shibani Kashyap, Mona Sarkar	4:49
3.	"Jeena Hai Toh Jeena Hain"	Nitin Raikwar	Nitin Raikwar	Vinod Rathod, Shibani Kashyap, Mona Sarkar	5:29
4.	"Kanha Kanha"	Satchik Puranik	Ronkini Sharma, Zoeb Khan	Sonu Nigam	5:55
5.	"Fakra Hai - Aurat"	Nitin Raikwar	Nitin Raikwar	Shibani Kashyap	4:12
Total length:					24:09

== Reception ==
Taran Adarsh of IndiaFM gave the film 1 out of 5, writing, "On the whole, MR. YA MISS will neither appeal to Mr., Master, Miss or Mrs. amongst moviegoers." Indrani Roy Mitra of Rediff.com wrote, "An apology of a film, Mr Ya Miss proves once again that not every good actor can be a good director. Direction is not everyone's cup of tea. Comedy, Ms Mali, is serious business. It's time you realised that.".
