= Jaane Kahan Se Aayi Hai =

2010 Indian film by Milap Zaveri

- Theatrical release poster
- Directed by: Milap Zaveri
- Written by: Milap Zaveri
- Produced by: Mukesh Talreja; Nikkhil Advani
- Starring: Ritesh Deshmukh; Jacqueline Fernandez; Sonal Sehgal; Ruslaan Mumtaz
- Cinematography: Attar Singh Saini
- Edited by: Manan Ajay Sagar
- Music by: Sajid–Wajid
- Production company: People Tree Films
- Distributed by: Warner Bros. Pictures
- Release date: 9 April 2010
- Running time: 115 minutes
- Country: India
- Language: Hindi

Jaane Kahan Se Aayi Hai (transl. No Idea Where She Came From) is a 2010 Indian Hindi-language science fiction romance film directed by Milap Zaveri. It stars Riteish Deshmukh, Jacqueline Fernandez, Sonal Sehgal and Ruslaan Mumtaz in lead roles. It was released on 9 April 2010 to mixed reviews from critics.

ASTPL, an Indian software developer, also released a mobile video game based on the film.

== Plot ==
Rejected by females since his birth, Mumbai-based Rajesh Parekh works as a clap-boy with filmmaker Farah Khan and lives a wealthy lifestyle with his parents, Ramnikbhai and Sushila. The country is agog with the popularity of Farah's latest mega-star, Desh, who has a huge female fan following. Rajesh meets and is attracted to Desh's sister, Natasha, but ends up with heartbreak when she rejects him. While watching a movie in a drive-in theater, a gorgeous Amazon lands in his arms and passes out. He takes her home, confides in his friend, Kaushal Milan Tiwari, and attempts to find out who she is. The mystery deepens when she communicates that she is from Venus, and is on Earth to find true love. They decide to name her Tara and show her photos of two of the hottest males on Earth – Brad Pitt and Desh. Since the former is already taken, and the latter is single, they decide to try and woo him.

== Cast ==
- Ritesh Deshmukh as Rajesh Parekh
- Jacqueline Fernandez as Tara
- Ruslaan Mumtaz as Desh
- Vishal Malhotra as Kaushal Milind Tiwari
- Sonal Sehgal as Natasha
- Satish Shah as Mr. Parekh
- Supriya Pilgaonkar as Mrs. Parekh
- Boman Irani as Ali
- Amrita Rao as Tia (cameo appearance)
- Anvita Dutt Guptan as Journalist (uncredited appearance)
- Vijay Patkar as Waiter

Special appearances as themselves;

- Akshay Kumar
- Farah Khan
- Karan Johar
- Deepika Padukone
- Priyanka Chopra
- Preity Zinta
- Sajid Khan
- Anushka Sharma
- Vidya Balan
- Katrina Kaif

== Reception ==
Taran Adarsh from Bollywood Hungama rated it 2.5/5 and added "Jaane Kahan Se Aayi Hai is a time-pass movie... You won’t be that disappointed with this one." Kaveree Bamzai of India Today gave it 1 out of 5, writing, "Riteish is a fine actor, who deserves much better than a script that has been slapped together by a bunch of juveniles, and directed by the head juvenile." Sukanya Verma of Rediff.com gave the 2 out of 5, writing, "The only reason you're able to keep pace with the irregularities in the script's momentum is because of its young, efficient cast."

== Music ==
The music of Jaane Kahan Se Aayi Hai is composed by Sajid–Wajid to lyrics penned by Sameer. The soundtrack received notably mixed critical response and did well at stores. A review said, "They (the composer duo) are back to their usual stuff in Jaane Kahan Se Aayi Hai. The soundtrack has retention value and the potential to stand out."

Track listing
No.	Title	Singer(s)	Length
1.	"Keh Do Zara"	Rashid Ali	5:01
2.	"Nacha Main"	Sonu Nigam & Sowmya Raoh	4:53
3.	"Jaane Kahan Se Aayi Hai"	Shaan	4:45
4.	"Koi Rok Bhi Lo"	Sonu Nigam & Sunidhi Chauhan	5:09
5.	"Keh Do Zara (Remix)"	Rashid Ali	3:32
Total length:			23:20
