= Aao Wish Karein =

2009 Indian film by Glen Barreto

- Theatrical release poster
- Directed by: Glen Barreto
- Written by: Aftab Shivdasani; Ravinder Manga (dialogue)
- Screenplay by: Aftab Shivdasani; Glen Barreto(additional screenplay)
- Produced by: Aftab Shivdasani
- Starring: Aftab Shivdasani; Aamna Shariff; Rati Agnihotri
- Narrated by: Shah Rukh Khan
- Cinematography: Keshav Prakash
- Music by: Songs: Mikey McCleary, Xulfi, Ankur Tewari
- Distributed by: T-Series
- Release date: 13 November 2009
- Running time: 140 minutes
- Country: India
- Language: Hindi

Aao Wish Karein (transl. Come, Make a Wish) is a 2009 Indian fantasy comedy film directed by Glen Barreto. The film stars Aftab Shivdasani and Aamna Shariff. It was released on 13 November 2009. It is loosely based on the 1988 American film Big. (Note: Attributed to multiple references:)

== Cast ==
- Aftab Shivdasani as Mickey Mehra (adult)
  - Rishabh Sharma as Mickey (young)
- Aamna Shariff as Mitika
- Johny Lever as Hitchcock
- Rohan Shah as Bonny (young)
  - Riteish Deshmukh as Bonny (adult) (Special appearance)
- Rati Agnihotri as Nisha V. Mehra
- Yatin Karyekar as Vikas Mehra
- Tiku Talsania as Tiku Malhotra
- Suhasini Mulay as Bonny's Daadi
- Pushtiie Shakti as Shruti Mukherjee
- Shah Rukh Khan as Narrator

== Soundtrack ==
Track listing
No.	Title	Singer(s)	Length
1.	"Kuch Aisa"	Xulfi
2.	"Kuch Aisa" (sad)	Xulfi
3.	"Reh Jaane Do"	Xulfi
4.	"Sab Yahaan Hain"	Kunal Ganjawala
5.	"Sabse Peeche Hum Khade"	Kunal Ganjawala
6.	"Sabse Peeche Hum Khade" (reprise)	Kunal Ganjawala
7.	"Sabse Peeche Kyon Khade"	Sunidhi Chauhan
8.	"Tum Mere Ho"	Kunal Ganjawala, Sunidhi Chauhan

== Critical reception ==
Anupama Chopra in her NDTV review gave it 0.5 out 5 stars, said, "All I asked for was a passably decent film but Aao Wish Karein couldn't even manage that. Steer Clear". Nikhat Kazmi from The Times of India gave it 2 out 5 stars. Taran Adarsh in Sify gave 1.5 stars out of 5 and said that the film has some endearing moments, but not enough to salvage it and is anything but a fairy tale.
