= Great Grand Masti =

2016 Indian film by Indra Kumar

- Theatrical release poster
- Directed by: Indra Kumar
- Written by: Aakash Kaushik; Madhur Sharma
- Story by: Tushar Hiranandani
- Produced by: Sameer Nair; Aman Gill; Ashok Thakeria; Markand Adhikari; Anand Pandit; Shobha Kapoor; Ekta Kapoor
- Starring: Riteish Deshmukh; Vivek Oberoi; Aftab Shivdasani; Urvashi Rautela
- Cinematography: Nigam Bomzan
- Edited by: Sanjay Sankla
- Music by: Songs: Sanjeev–Darshan; Shaarib-Toshi; Shaan; Gourov Dasgupta; Roshin Balu; Score: Sanjay Wandrekar; Atul Ralingan
- Production companies: Balaji Motion Pictures; Maruti International; Sri Adhikari Brothers
- Distributed by: Reliance Entertainment
- Release date: 15 July 2016
- Running time: 127 minutes (theatrical version); 134 minutes (director's cut version)
- Country: India
- Language: Hindi
- Budget: ₹19 crore
- Box office: ₹20 crore

Great Grand Masti (transl. Great Grand Fun) is a 2016 Indian Hindi-language sex comedy horror film directed by Indra Kumar. It is the third installment in the Masti film series after Masti (2004) and Grand Masti (2013). It is produced by Sameer Nair, Aman Gill, Ashok Thakeria, Markand Adhikari and Anand Pandit.

It features an ensemble cast of Riteish Deshmukh, Vivek Oberoi, Aftab Shivdasani, Shreyas Talpade, Urvashi Rautela, Shraddha Das, Mishti Chakraborty, Pooja Bose and Sanjay Mishra in the pivotal roles. Originally scheduled to release on 22 July 2016, the date was advanced to 15 July 2016 after a pirated copy of the film was reportedly leaked online. The censor board made 23 deletions from the film including some dialogue deletions and a complete scene and gave the film an A certificate.

== Plot ==
Amar, Meet, and Prem are three friends who always want fun. They are married to Sapna, Rekha, and Nisha and live an unhappy life with their wives because of their mother-in-law, brother-in-law, and sister-in-law, respectively. Amar's mother-in-law wants her late husband to be reborn, and on the orders of a fake spiritual guru, she has stopped her daughter from having physical relations with Amar. Meet's wife has a twin brother, and whenever Meet tries to go near his wife, it turns on his brother-in-law (who is a bodybuilder). The connection between the twins causes great problems, like Meet's wife beating him up unintentionally when her brother is beating up some goon. Prem's sister-in-law is very hot yet very silly. She comes to live with them and wants to sleep in the same room as her elder sister, forcing Prem to sleep on the couch away from his wife.

One day, they meet in a bar and decide to enjoy their lives together. They decide to go to Amar's village to sell off his family's old mansion, and meanwhile have fun with the hot and sexy ladies in the village. When they reach the village, they find out that people are scared of the Haveli. An old man tells them that there used to be a father-daughter duo who lived in the haveli 50 years ago. The daughter, Ragini, was very beautiful, and many boys were smitten by her beauty, but her father never let any guy near her. At the age of 20, Ragini died due to a snake bite, but her soul still resides in the haveli in search of a man who'll do masti with her. The guys laugh it off and proceed towards the haveli. There, they meet a very hot girl who's been living secretly in the haveli, as she is alone and has nowhere to go. The boys hire her as their maid, and each tries to attract her. Ragini informs the boys that one of them must have sex with her to free her soul, and whoever does so will die. The boys get scared and try to escape the mansion, but to no avail. Prem commits to doing so to buy them some time, and in the meantime, they hire Babu Rangeela, a male prostitute, to have sex with Ragini.

At the last moment, their wives show up, and Ragini turns Babu into a chicken. Ragini makes the boys do weird stuff in front of their wives and in-laws, who join them at the haveli, so they would leave. When the boys see that their wives are secretly fasting for them, even when Ragini depicted them as such perverts in front of them, they decide to confront Ragini. They meet Ragini and tell her they won't have sex with her, and she can't harm them as their wives are fasting for their long lives. Ragini hurts them, but they light a fire around her and call her father's spirit to help them. Rather, Babu's spirit comes (who was cooked by the three wives) and has sex with Ragini, hence satisfying her urge. Babu and Ragini leave the world together, and the three couples live happily ever after.

== Cast ==
- Riteish Deshmukh as Amar
- Vivek Oberoi as Meet
- Aftab Shivdasani as Prem
- Shreyas Talpade as Babu Rangeela
- Urvashi Rautela as Shabri/Ragani
- Puja Banerjee as Sapna
- Mishti Chakraborty as Rekha
- Shraddha Das as Nisha
- Kangana Sharma as Prem's sister-in-law
- Usha Nadkarni as Amar's mother-in-law
- Ketan Karande as Meet's brother-in-law
- Sanjay Mishra as Antakshari Baba
- Sonali Raut as Saniya
- Sudesh Lehri as Ramse
- Ghazal Sharma as Ritu

== Music ==
The music for Great Grand Masti is composed by Sanjeev–Darshan, Shaarib-Toshi, Superbia (Shaan, Gourov & Roshin). The lyrics have been penned by Sameer Anjaan, Manoj Yadav and Kumaar. The music rights have been acquired by Zee Music Company. The first song "Teri Kamar Ko" was released on 21 June 2016. The song 'Lipstick Laga Ke' had become so much popular and was one of the top 20 songs of 2016.

No.	Title	Lyrics	Music	Singer(s)	Length
1.	"Teri Kamar Ko"	Kumaar	Sanjeev–Darshan	Sanjeev Rathod, Darshan Rathod, Kanika Kapoor	3:28
2.	"Resham Ka Rumaal"	Manoj Yadav	Shaarib-Toshi	Toshi Sabri, Soniya Sharma	3:03
3.	"I Wanna Tera Ishq"	Kumaar	Sanjeev–Darshan	Shivranjani Singh, Shivangi Bhayana	5:02
4.	"Lipstick Laga Ke"	Sameer Anjaan	Superbia (Shaan, Gourov & Roshin)	Shaan, Payal Dev	3:29
Total length:					15:02

== Release ==
=== Online piracy issue ===
On 5 July 2016, two weeks ahead of its nationwide release on 22 July 2016, a pirated copy of the film was reported to be shared online on various sites and was hosted on several peer-to-peer sharing websites like KickassTorrents and The Pirate Bay. According to investigators, the leaked copy carried a watermark, implying that it was created from the sample copy sent by the producers to the CBFC for reviewing purposes.

=== Box office ===
The film collected around ₹12 crore (US$1.2 million) on its opening day and had a lifetime worldwide collection of ₹19 crore (US$2.0 million) against a budget of ₹50 crore (US$5.2 million). The film was a box office bomb.

== Controversies ==
On 15 July 2016, actor Shiney Ahuja sent a legal notice to the film's producers accusing them of criminal contempt for naming a maid Shiney in the film. A member of Ahuja's legal representation alleged that this was a reference to Ahuja's 2011 conviction for raping a maid in his employ.
