= Ketan Karande =

Indian actor (born 1978)

- Born: 7 April 1978 (age 48); Mumbai, Maharashtra, India
- Occupation: Film actor
- Years active: 2004–present

Ketan Karande (born 7 April 1978) is an Indian actor who gained popularity by playing Bhima in Sony TV's TV show Suryaputra Karn and Ghatotkacha in Mahabharat(2013 TV series).Ketan has also shared screen with Amitabh Bachchan and Amir Khan in Thugs Of Hindostan and Ajay Devgn in Action Jackson where he played important roles in both films.

== Filmography ==
=== Television ===
Year	Title	Role	Channel
2004 - 2005	Karma	Yaksh	Star Plus
2012 - 2013	Arjun	SI Chotu	Star Plus
2013	Jodha Akbar	Khaibar	Zee TV
2014	Mahabharat	Ghatotkacha	Star Plus
2014	Har Mushkil Ka Hal Akbar Birbal	-	Big Magic
2015 - 2016	Suryaputra Karn	Bhima	Sony TV
2015	Chidiya Ghar	Sandeshwar Mama (Saandhu Mama) (Bull)	SAB TV
2016 - 2017	Sankat Mochan Mahabali Hanumaan	Ahiravan	Sony TV
2019	Vighnaharta Ganesha	Shumbh	Sony TV
2019	Shrimad Bhagwat Mahapuran	Vali / Sugriva	Colors TV
2019	RadhaKrishn	Hiranyakashipu	Star Bharat
2020	Tenali Rama	Bharkam	SAB TV
2021	Baalveer Returns	Tejas Pehelwan	SAB TV
2023 - 2025	Shiv Shakti - Tap Tyaag Tandav	Nandi	Colors TV
2024	Suhaagan	Shera	Colors TV

=== Films ===
Key
†	Denotes films that have not yet been released

Year	Film	Role	Notes
2004	Mujhse Shaadi Karogi	Rocky	
2007	Fool & Final		
2008	God Tussi Great Ho	Bodybuilder	
2011	Saarathi	-	
2013	Race 2	-	
2014	Action Jackson	-	Xavier's henchman
2016	Great Grand Masti	Vivek Oberoi's brother-in-law	
2018	Thugs Of Hindostan	Bheema	
2019	Bharaate	A goon who abducts the tourists	Kannada film
2019	Panipat	Mhadji Sjinde	
2022	James	Joseph Antony gang members	Kannada film
