= Farex =

Food for babies

- Product type: Baby food
- Current owner: Danone
- Country: United Kingdom
- Introduced: 1934
- Markets: Australia; New Zealand; India; Brazil
- Previous owners: Glaxo; Heinz; Dumex; Wockhardt
- Ambassadors: Mahesh Babu; Prithvi Shaw
- Tagline: "Your baby's first solid food for all-round growth."

Farex is a food for babies and infants made primarily from rice flour and enriched with vitamins. It was produced by the company Heinz.

== About ==
Farex baby cereal was first produced by the company Glaxo in 1934. Today, Farex is one of the most popular foods for babies in Australia and New Zealand. Farex now offers cereals for different ages.
