= De Taali =

2008 Indian film by Eeshwar Nivas

- Theatrical poster
- Directed by: Eeshwar Nivas
- Written by: Abbas Tyrewala
- Based on: Saving Silverman by Dennis Dugan
- Produced by: Ravi Walia
- Starring: Riteish Deshmukh; Aftab Shivdasani; Ayesha Takia; Rimi Sen
- Cinematography: Amitabha Singh
- Edited by: Rameshwar S. Bhagat
- Music by: Vishal–Shekhar
- Distributed by: Sahara One Motion Pictures
- Release date: 20 June 2008
- Country: India
- Language: Hindi

De Taali (transl. Hi-5) is a 2008 Indian Hindi-language comedy film directed by Eeshwar Nivas and produced by Ravi Walia. It stars Riteish Deshmukh, Aftab Shivdasani, Ayesha Takia, and Rimi Sen, and is a remake of the 2001 film Saving Silverman. The film revolves around three childhood friends who have grown together and when a new girl enters their life, the whole dynamics of their friendship change. The film was initially titled Jalsa but was later named De Taali after a song in the movie. The film was released on 20 June 2008, and was a box-office bomb.

== Plot ==
Abhishek 'Abhi', Paresh 'Paglu', and Amrita 'Amu' have been best friends since their childhood. Abhi's father is a very rich businessman, and his only son has no interest in work. Abhi has had many girlfriends, but none of them lasted long. Paglu and Abhi's father ask Amu to marry Abhi because they know each other very well. One day Abhi comes and tells Amu that he loves his childhood friend; Amu thinks that she is the girl whom Abhi loves, and she, too, falls in love with him.

Abhi later reveals that Kartika is a woman he loves, but she is actually after his money. Amu is heartbroken. Amu and Paglu start disliking her and try to separate them. Abhi gets angry with them and decides to marry Karthika outside India. At the airport, Amu hits Kartika, and she falls unconscious. Amu and Paglu abduct Kartika and force her to write a letter to Abhi saying that she doesn't love him. Paglu tells Abhi that Amu is the right girl for him, and Abhi falls in love with her. Paglu finds out that her name is Anjali, not Karthika. She is not in love with Abhi but with his money, and she has a history of cheating people for money. Paglu then frees her, and she tells Abhi about the kidnapping. Abhi is unhappy hearing this and decides to marry Karthika anyway. On the wedding day, before Paglu tries to stop them from getting married, he meets a few people whom Karthika has already betrayed; Abhi gets angry and tells Paglu and Amu to leave. The next day, Abhi comes back, apologises to them, and says that he isn't married. He tells them that when they left the wedding, Anjali told him that she had learned a lot from the time Paglu and Amu kept her in captivity. She apologises that she can't marry him and that Amu is the right girl for him. Abhi proposes to Amu. Later, Paglu ends up with the changed Anjali.

== Cast ==
- Ritesh Deshmukh as Paresh “Paglu” Gupta
- Aftab Shivdasani as Abhishek “Abhi” Agarwal
- Ayesha Takia as Amrita “Amu”
- Rimi Sen as Anjali Nahata / Karthika Rai
- Anupam Kher as Mr. Agarwal, Abhishek's father
- Mukul Dev as Sunil
- Pavan Malhotra as Professor Mhatre
- Rasika Joshi as Mrs. Moolchand Nahata
- Sanjay Narvekar as Venkat
- Saurabh Shukla as Landord Godbole

=== Special appearances ===
- Neha Dhupia as Sarah
- Anjana Sukhani as Anita
- Hrishitaa Bhatt as Tanya

== Music ==
De Taali

Soundtrack album by Vishal–Shekhar
- Released: 7 March 2008
- Genre: Film soundtrack
- Label: T-Series
- Producer: Ravi Walia

Vishal–Shekhar chronology
Bhoothnath (2008)	De Taali (2008)	Bachna Ae Haseeno (2008)

The music was conducted by the duo Vishal–Shekhar.

=== Track listing ===
#	Song	Singer(s)	Duration
1	"Everybody Put Your Hands Together"	Shaan, Sunidhi Chauhan & Anushka Manchanda	3:12
2	"De Taali"	Shaan & Sunidhi Chauhan	4:09
3	"Aaj Mein Boond Hoon"	Shekhar Ravjiani & Shreya Ghoshal	3:55
4	"Hone Lagi"	Anushka Manchanda & Shekhar Ravjiani	4:05
5	"Maari Teetri Maari Teetri" (The Butterfly Song)	Raja Hasan	4:46
6	"Tooti Phooti Dhadkone Ki"	KK, Shaan & Sunidhi Chauhan	4:45
7	"Hone Lagi" (Jump Into Bed Mix)	Anushka Manchanda & Shekhar Ravjiani	4:20
8	"De Taali" (The Clap Trap Mix)	Shaan & Sunidhi Chauhan	3:50

== Reception ==
The film did not really take off at the box office. And to add to its woes the reviews were not too good either. However actor Riteish Deshmukh seems to have pleased everyone with his performance as he got some great reviews. Noyon Jyoti Parasara of AOL India said, "Truly this movie is Ritesh's. Ritesh has already established himself as a good comic actor and De Taali seconds that."
