= Milap Zaveri =

Indian filmmaker

Milap Milan Zaveri
- Occupations: Film director writer
- Years active: 2002–present

Milap Milan Zaveri is an Indian film director and writer who started his career as a dialogue writer in 2002 with the film Yeh Mohabbat Hai and went on to serve as a writer for commercially successful ventures, including Kaante (2002), Masti (2004), Heyy Babyy (2007), Housefull (2010), Shootout at Wadala (2013), Grand Masti (2013), Main Tera Hero (2014) and Ek Villain (2014). He made his directorial debut with the film Jaane Kahan Se Aayi Hai (2010), which did not do well, but his later films, such as Satyameva Jayate (2018) and Ek Deewane Ki Deewaniyat (2025) proved to be box office hits.

== Filmography ==
Year	Film	Director	Writer	Lyrics
2002	Yeh Mohabbat Hai		Dialogues	
2002	Kaante		Dialogues	
2003	Jhankaar Beats		Dialogues	
2003	Mumbai Matinee			Yes
2004	Plan		Dialogues	
2004	Masti		Yes	
2004	Kyun! Ho Gaya Na...		Yes	
2004	Musafir		Yes	
2005	Lucky: No Time for Love		Yes	
2005	Home Delivery		Dialogues	
2006	Pyare Mohan		Yes	
2006	Naksha		Yes	
2007	Heyy Babyy		Yes	
2008	Woodstock Villa		Dialogues	
2010	Jaane Kahan Se Aayi Hai	Yes	Yes	
2010	Housefull		Screenplay	
2011	Desi Boyz		Screenplay	
2012	Delhi Safari		Dialogues	
2013	Shootout at Wadala		Dialogues	
2013	Grand Masti		Yes	
2014	Main Tera Hero		Dialogues	
2014	Ek Villain		Dialogues	
2014	Ungli		Dialogues	
2016	Kyaa Kool Hain Hum 3		Yes	
2016	Mastizaade	Yes	Yes	
2018	Hate Story 4		Dialogues	
2018	Satyameva Jayate	Yes	Yes	
2019	Marjaavaan	Yes	Yes	
2021	Satyameva Jayate 2	Yes	Yes	
2024	Singham Again		Dialogues	
2025	Ek Deewane Ki Deewaniyat	Yes	Yes	
2025	Mastiii 4	Yes	Yes	
