= Grand Masti =

2013 Indian film by Indra Kumar

- Theatrical poster
- Directed by: Indra Kumar
- Written by: Milap Zaveri; Tushar Hiranandani
- Screenplay by: Rahul Luhiya
- Story by: Indra Kumar
- Produced by: Ashok Thakeria; Indra Kumar
- Starring: Vivek Oberoi; Riteish Deshmukh; Aftab Shivdasani; Sonalee; Karishma Tanna; Manjari Fadnis
- Cinematography: Rituraj Narain
- Edited by: Sanjay Sankla
- Music by: Songs: Anand Raj Anand; Sanjeev–Darshan; Background Score: Sanjay Wandrekar
- Production company: Maruti International
- Release date: 13 September 2013
- Running time: 137 minutes
- Country: India
- Language: Hindi
- Budget: ₹34 crore (US$4.2 million)
- Box office: ₹151.24 crore (US$21 million)

Grand Masti (transl. Grand fun), also referred to as Masti 2, is a 2013 Indian Hindi-language sex comedy film directed by Indra Kumar and produced by Ashok Thakeria. The film is a sequel to the 2004 film Masti, and the second installment of the Masti (film series). It features Vivek Oberoi, Riteish Deshmukh and Aftab Shivdasani reprising their roles from the original, but the story is new and does not continue from the earlier installment. The film also stars Bruna Abdullah, Karishma Tanna, Sonalee, Kainaat Arora, Maryam Zakaria and Manjari Fadnis in key roles.

Grand Masti was released on 13 September 2013, and was one of the highest-grossing Bollywood films of 2013. The film received largely positive responses from critics because of its extreme sexual nature, and it was a box office success. Grand Masti was the highest grossing A-rated Bollywood film in India, until it was overtaken by Kabir Singh in 2019 and then Animal in 2023. The film entered Bollywood's 100 crore club and was declared a Super Hit by Box Office India. The third installment of Masti (film series), Great Grand Masti was released on 15 July 2016.

== Plot ==
Three friends – Meet (Vivek Oberoi), Prem (Aftab Shivdasani), and Amar (Ritesh Deshmukh) – are unhappily married and have unsatisfactory sex lives. Meet thinks that his wife Unatti (Karishma Tanna) is having an affair with her boss; Prem feels that his wife Tulsi (Manjari Fadnis) doesn't spend quality time with him, and Amar believes that his wife Mamta (Sonalee) is more concerned about their son, Pappu.

One day, the men receive an invite from their college, SLUTS (Sri Lalchand University of Technology and Science), to attend their reunion. Their wives don't come with them, so the three decide to use the trip to get up to mischief and escape their unhappy marriages. When they arrive, they find that everyone else is behaving in a conservative manner due to the fear of Principal Robert Pereira (Pradeep Rawat), who hangs people naked from a tree if they disobey his rules. Hardik (Suresh Menon), an ex-student, is in a mental asylum because of the principal's discipline.

Prem meets one of his former teachers, Rose (Maryam Zakaria), who is washing her cleavage with water, and is attracted to her. Meet meets Marlo (Kainaat Arora), who causes the car horn to blare because of her big breasts, and is attracted to her. Amar meets Mary (Bruna Abdullah), who seductively opens a bottle with an opener hidden in her inner garments and is attracted to her. The men try to initiate affairs with the women, but find out that Rose is Robert's wife, Mary is his daughter and Marlo is his sister.

The men's wives arrive at the college, for the reunion. The trio then receives an MMS message containing footage of them getting intimate with the women, and manages to hide the video from their wives. They find out that it was Hardik who sent the video, and he starts blackmailing them. He wants them to kill Robert to fulfill his revenge, or else he will show the footage to their wives. The trio is unable to kill Robert and decides to delete the videos from Hardik's phone and succeed.

On the last day of the reunion Robert mixes a love potion into the soup. The trio ends up with Rose, Mary and Marlo, and Robert catches them red handed. While being chased by Robert, Rose reveals that Robert is impotent. When the trio ends up on the roof of a building, Hardik pushes Robert, who slides down the roof and hangs on to a bar. The men try to save him, but Hardik pushes them too and they hang onto Robert. The girls come and push Hardik off the roof and he hangs on to Meet. The three tell Robert the truth about making love with Marlo, Mary and Rose. The girls strip to their underwear to make a rope out of their clothes but fail. They decide to strip naked to extend the rope with their bras and panties, but the boys fall and end up in hospital.

Their wives angrily ask them what exactly happened that night. Robert calmly replies that due to a misunderstanding, their husbands suffered this consequence. Shortly later, a doctor comes and informs Robert that he is no longer impotent since blood now flows all over his body due to the pressure generated while hanging on the bar. Hardik marries Marlo. The film ends with Amar, Meet and Prem having sex with their respective wives. Robert and Hardik too have sex with Rose and Marlo. Mary is the one left alone who while bathing naked in a bathtub asks the audience to join her.

== Cast ==
- Vivek Oberoi as Meet Mehta
- Riteish Deshmukh as Amar Saxena
- Aftab Shivdasani as Prem Chawla
- Sonalee as Mamta Saxena (Amar's wife)
- Manjari Fadnis as Tulsi Chawla (Prem's wife)
- Karishma Tanna as Unnati Mehta (Meet's wife)
- Maryam Zakaria as Rose (Prem's interest, Robert's wife)
- Bruna Abdullah as Mary (Amar's interest, Robert's daughter)
- Kainaat Arora as Marlo (Meet's interest, Robert's sister and later Hardik's wife)
- Suresh Menon as Hardik
- Pradeep Rawat as Principal Robert Pereira
- Dino Morea as Bank Manager (uncredited)

== Production ==
The production of the film was to begin in the first week of August 2012, but due to actor Riteish Deshmukh's father Vilasrao Deshmukh's critical health condition, the film's commencement was put off by a few days. Says a source close to the project, "Grand Masti, the sequel to Masti has been in the writing process for the last one and a half years. Finally, writers Milap Zaveri and Tushar Hiranandani cracked an idea and scripted the sequel. The film brings back the Riteish Deshmukh-Aftab Shivdasani-Vivek Oberoi trio, along with four new girls. Grand Masti was supposed to kick start this week. Then, Ritesh's father fell ill. He can't be expected to act funny at a time like this."

A suggestion that the film take off without Riteish was also put forward. However, producer Ashok Thakeria and director Indra Kumar refused, arguing that a comedy is a happy occasion and therefore all the actors needed to be comfortable. Reportedly, the film then started filming on 9 September 2012. The film's original release date was put between 31 July-late August 2013.

According to the print version of Hindustan Times (dated 18 July 2013), Grand Masti (Masti 2) was set to release on 13 September 2013. The first official theatrical trailer was uploaded on the official YouTube channel on 18 July 2013. The stadium scene was shot in DY Patil Stadium apparently.

Parts of Grand Masti was shot at the Laxmi Vilas Palace, Vadodara, in Gujarat.

== Soundtrack ==
Track listing
No.	Title	Artist(s)	Length
1.	"Grand Masti" (title song)	Sanjeev Rathod, Darshan Rathod & Payal Dev	4:19
2.	"Zulmi Zulmi"	Mika Singh	4:11
3.	"Tu Bhi Mood Mein"	Wajid Ali & Ritu Pathak	4:36
4.	"Grand Masti" (remix)	Sanjeev Rathod, Darshan Rathod & Payal Dev	4:08
5.	"Grand Masti" (mash up)	Sanjeev Rathod, Darshan Rathod, Payal Dev, Mika Singh, Wajid Khan, Dj Anshul Makhija	4:41

The film's music was composed by Anand Raj Anand and Sanjeev Darshan, and the lyricists are Kumaar and Manoj Darpan. It contains 3 songs, one remix song of the title track and one mash up.

== Release ==
Grand Masti was made at a budget of ₹310 million, including the production cost of 190 million and the remaining 120 million for Print & marketing. Grand Masti was submitted to the censor board three months ahead of its release date in June 2013. The film was not released in the UAE. Grand Masti was released huge on 13 September 2013 across approximately 2100 screens in India.

=== Controversies ===
The Punjab and Haryana High Court had stayed the release of Grand Masti in Punjab, Haryana and Chandigarh on 10 September 2013, but later lifted the stay order on the film and the film was released on 13 September 2013. A division bench of the HC has vacated the stay after hearing an appeal filed by the movie's producer Ashok Thakeria against the orders of the single bench. After a complaint about vulgar and obscene dialogue in the film, the Central Board of Film Certification on 16 September 2013 said it had constituted an inquiry against the movie. A 22-year-old Vasai, Maharashtra resident, Mangesh Bhogal died due to a heart attack caused by excessive laughing.

== Marketing ==
The film was promoted on TV shows like Comedy Nights with Kapil. The star cast also visited theatres upon the release of the film. A book on the film written by Neha Puntambekar, basically chronicling the various escapades of Amar, Meet and Prem, the three principal characters of Masti franchise was also released. Mumbai Indians cricketers Sachin Tendulkar, Harbhajan Singh and Pragyan Ojha attended a screening of the film in Ahmedabad during preparation for 2013 Champions League Twenty20.

== Critical response ==
The film received mostly negative responses from critics due to its adult content but a polarised welcome from the general public, while youngsters constituted most of the film's viewership, it was criticised from the family audience's point of view.

Taran Adarsh of Bollywood Hungama gave the film 3.5/5 and stated that Grand Masti "crosses all limits and boundaries vis-a-vis adult humor. This one's strictly for those who relish naughty jokes, outrageous lines and scandalous visuals." Anupama Chopra of the Hindustan Times gave the film a 0.5/5 stars. Mohar Basu of Koimoi gave it 0.5/5 and called it a "grand tapestry of trash". Rajeev Masand of CNN-IBN gave 1.5 stars out of 5, commenting The sad truth is that 'Grand Masti' revels in making you cringe, not laugh. Adult humor tends to work best when some things are left to your imagination. But the makers of this film force-feed the audience images and dialogues and references so discomfiting, the only laughs you'll hear are nervous chuckles."

Rohit Khilnani of India Today awarded the film with 1.5/5 stars. Abhishek Mande of Rediff introduced 0/5 and remarked, "there is no way you can enjoy this movie and still claim you respect women".

== Box office ==
=== India ===
Grand Masti earned the biggest opening at morning shows in 2013 on its first day. Grand Masti had a very good first day, grossing around ₹120 million (US$1.2 million) net. It was the highest opening day of 2013 after Chennai Express, Yeh Jawaani Hai Deewani and Race 2. The film collected around ₹130 million (US$1.3 million) on its second day, and then took its opening weekend total to around ₹400 million (US$4.2 million) nett. Grand Masti remained steady on weekdays. Its five-day total amounted to ₹545.0 million nett. Grand Masti had a first-week gross of around ₹636.6 million nett. The film earned around 32.5–35.0 million nett on its 8th day. It had a decent second weekend of around 122.5–125.0 million nett. The film collected ₹52.5 million in its third weekend and subsequently ₹77.5 million in its third week to have a total of ₹905 million (US$9.4 million) nett. According to Box Office India, the film's final domestic nett was ₹920 million. (Note: Sources like Bollywood Hungama and Koimoi reported box-office figures at ₹1 billion nett, thus making it the first Adult film to enter the coveted 100 crore club.)

=== Overseas ===
The film collected $1,259,000 internationally over its first weekend. The film had collections of around $3 million in ten days.

== Sequel ==
The sequel to the film titled Great Grand Masti was released after almost 3 years on 15 July 2016. Another sequel Mastiii 4 was released 12 years later on 21 November 2025.
