= Bruna Abdullah =

Brazilian actress

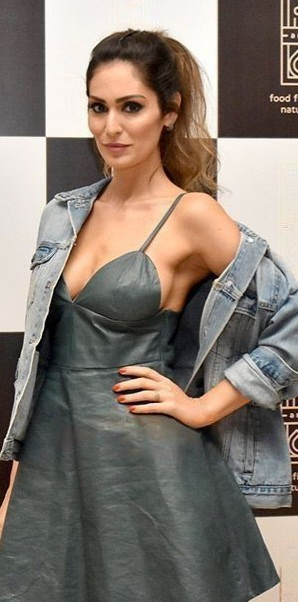
- Abdullah in 2018
- Born: Guaíba, Rio Grande do Sul, Brazil
- Occupation: Actress
- Years active: 2007–2023
- Spouse: Allan Frase (m. 2019)
- Children: 1

Bruna Abdullah is a Brazilian actress working primarily in Bollywood. She played the role of Mary in the adult comedy film Grand Masti and Giselle in Punit Malhotra's I Hate Luv Storys (2010). She also starred in the 2012 Tamil movie Billa II and in 2014 film Jai Ho as Anne.

== Personal life ==
Bruna was born in Guaíba, Brazil to a mother of Syrian descent and a father of German-Italian ancestry. She got engaged to her Scottish boyfriend Allan Frase on 25 July 2018. They got married in May 2019. The couple has a daughter, born in September 2019.

== Filmography ==
=== Film ===
- All films are in Hindi, unless otherwise noted

Year	Film	Role	Note
2007	Cash	Herself	Item number in song "Reham Kare"
2010	I Hate Luv Storys	Giselle	
2011	Desi Boyz	Natasha Mehra	Item number in song "Subha Hone Na De"
2012	Billa II	Sameera	Tamil film
2013	Grand Masti	Mary	
2014	Jai Ho	Anne	
2015	Four Pillars of Basement	Bruna	
2016	Mastizaade	Bunty	Special appearance
2016	Yea Toh Two Much Ho Gayaa	Tina	
2018	Udanchhoo	Julia	
2023	Zindagi Shatranj Hai	Bruna	

=== Television ===
Year	Series	Role
2008	Dancing Queen	Herself
2009	Khatron Ke Khiladi	Herself
2013	Nach Baliye 6	Herself
2014	Comedy Classes	Nancy
