= Suresh Menon =

Bangladeshi actor and comedian

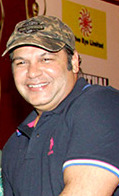
- Suresh Menon in 2016
- Born: 10 January 1967 (age 59); Palakkad, Kerala, India
- Occupations: actor comedian
- Spouse: Shurobi Menon
- Website: www.onenetworkentertainment.com

Suresh Menon (born 10 January 1967) is an Indian actor, comedian and television personality.

== Career ==
Menon has appeared in movies including Grand Masti, Phir Hera Pheri, Partner, Fool N Final, Krazzy 4, Deewane Huye Pagal, Chalte Chalte, Dil To Pagal Hai and Hello. Additionally, he has made an appearance on the television show Comedy Circus. He has appeared as a judge on the game show Hello Kaun? Pehchaan Kaun on Indian television channel STAR One, along with Chunky Pandey. Menon also hosts a number of radio shows. He has participated in the reality show Jhalak Dikhhla Jaa. He is also the co founder of ONE (One Entertainment Networks) which is involved in production, curation and aggregation of content across digital platforms.

He also records a podcast called Kaanmasti along with VJ Jose and Cyril d'Abreo.

He was a part of the 2019 Amazon Prime Video show Jestination Unknown.

== Filmography ==
=== Feature films ===
Year	Film	Role	Other notes
1997	Dil To Pagal Hai	Rahul's Friend	
1998	Doli Saja Ke Rakhna	Inderjit's friend	
1998	Kabhi Na Kabhi	Jaggu's friend	
2001	Asoka	Magadha soldier	
2002	Badhaai Ho Badhaai	Lucky Iyer	
2003	Stumped		
2003	Chalte Chalte	Shopkeeper	
2004	God Only Knows!	Adman	
2004	Dil Ne Jise Apna Kahaa		
2004	Kis Kis Ki Kismat	Ramalingam	
2005	Bachke Rehna Re Baba		
2005	Shaadi No. 1	Panditji	
2005	Deewane Huye Paagal	Veerappan 'Sunny' Khurana	
2006	Aksar	Benz	
2006	Phir Hera Pheri	Peter	
2006	Rocky: The Rebel	Prof. Bhimsen Krantikari	
2007	The Train		
2007	Partner	Kiran Mulchandani	
2007	Fool & Final	Bob	
2008	Krazzy 4	Daboo	
2008	Hello	Systems Guy	
2008	Dasvidaniya		
2008	Khalballi: Fun Unlimited		
2009	Bhramaram	Unnikrishnan	Malayalam film
2010	Tom Dick and Harry Rock Again	Bob Arora	
2010	Housefull	Santa Singh	
2010	Mallika	Inspector P K Girpade	
2010	No Problem	Constable Naidu	
2011	Bheja Fry 2	M. T. Shekharan	
2011	Chatur Singh Two Star	Purushutam Singh	
2011	Ra.One	Taxi driver	
2012	Midnight's Children	Field Marshal	
2013	Grand Masti	Hardik	
2014	Humshakals	Subramaniyam	
2016	Mastizaade	Das	
2017	Kaabil	Zafar	
2020	Captain Vidyut	Dr Dakhosla (voice)	Direct-to-video
2024	Bhool Bhulaiyaa 3	Pillai	

=== Television performances ===
Year	Title	Role	Notes	Ref.
1995	Main Bhi Detective	Various characters		
2004–2007	The Great Indian Comedy Show	Various characters		
2005	Nautanki Top 9	Host		
2007	Rakhee Ke Bouncers	Host/presenter		
2008	Bingo Aur Suresh Menon	Host/presenter		
2013	Jhalak Dikhhla Jaa 6	Contestant	16th place	
2018	Shrimaan Shrimati Phir Se	Dilruba Jarnail Singh Khurana		
2021	LOL - Hasse Toh Phasse	Contestant		
2024	Bigg Boss (Malayalam season 6)	Contestant	Evicted Day 14	
