= Mastiii 4 =

2025 Indian film by Milap Zaveri

- Theatrical release poster
- Directed by: Milap Zaveri
- Written by: Farrukh Dhondy; Milap Zaveri; Abhinav Vaidya
- Produced by: A Jhunjhunwala; Shikha Karan Ahluwalia; Indra Kumar; Ashok Thakeria; Shobha Kapoor; Ekta Kapoor
- Starring: Riteish Deshmukh; Vivek Oberoi; Aftab Shivdasani; Arshad Warsi; Tusshar Kapoor
- Cinematography: Sanket Shah
- Edited by: Sanjay Sankla
- Music by: Songs: Meet Bros; Sanjeev–Darshan; Score: Vishal Shelke
- Production companies: Balaji Motion Pictures; Waveband Production; Maruti International; Sri Adhikari Brothers
- Distributed by: Zee Studios
- Release date: 21 November 2025
- Running time: 141 minutes
- Country: India
- Language: Hindi
- Budget: ₹40 crore
- Box office: est. ₹15.14 crore

Mastiii 4 (transl. Fun 4) is a 2025 Indian Hindi-language adult comedy film directed by Milap Zaveri. The film is produced by Balaji Motion Pictures, Maruti International and Sri Adhikari Brothers. It is the fourth installment in the Masti film series. The film stars Riteish Deshmukh, Vivek Oberoi and Aftab Shivdasani. It was released theatrically on 21 November 2025.

The film was criticized by critics and was a box-office bomb, grossing ₹15 crore worldwide, becoming the lowest-grossing film in the Masti film series.

== Premise ==
Amar, Meet, and Prem feel trapped in their boring married routines and start longing for the excitement of their younger days. When they hear about a "Love Visa" that allows a week of complete freedom, they rush into the plan, hoping for fun and mischief. Their adventure quickly spirals out of control when their wives also decide to break the rules in their own way. What follows is a chain of chaotic misunderstandings, comic deceptions, and wild situations as both sides try to outplay each other, eventually learning that their marriages need honesty more than escapades.

== Cast ==
- Riteish Deshmukh as Amar Saxena
- Vivek Oberoi as Meet Mehta
- Aftab Shivdasani as Prem Chawla
- Elnaaz Norouzi as Bindiya Saxena
- Shreya Sharma as Aanchal Mehta
- Ruhi Singh as Geeta Chawla
- Arshad Warsi as Kamraj
- Nargis Fakhri as Menka
- Tusshar Kapoor as Pablo Putinwa
- Nishant Singh Malkani as Sid Walia
- Shaad Randhawa as Virat
- Natalia Janoszek as Rosie
- Tara Sumner as Rosemary
- Genelia Deshmukh as Herself (special appearance in song "Pakad Pakad")
- Saanand Verma (cameo appearance)

== Production ==
Principal photography commenced in December 2024. Filming was wrapped in August 2025.

== Soundtrack ==
Mastiii 4

Soundtrack album by Meet Bros and Sanjeev–Darshan
- Released: 4 December 2025
- Recorded: 2024–2025
- Genre: Feature film soundtrack
- Length: 31:09
- Language: Hindi
- Label: Zee Music Company
External audio
- Official Audio Jukebox on YouTube

The film's soundtrack was composed by Meet Bros and Sanjeev–Darshan with lyrics written by Danish Sabri, Mellow D, Meet Bros and Sanjeev Chaturvedi.

Track listing
No.	Title	Lyrics	Music	Singer(s)	Length
1.	"Pakad Pakad"	Danish Sabri	Meet Bros	Meet Bros, Danish Sabri, Aditya Jain, Adarsh Shukla	3:56
2.	"One In Crore"	Mellow D, Meet Bros	Meet Bros	Meet Bros, Mellow D	4:18
3.	"Nagin"	Danish Sabri	Meet Bros	Meet Bros. Amit Gupta, Aditya Jain, Adarsh Shukla	3:24
4.	"Daga"	Danish Sabri	Meet Bros	Meet Bros, Stebin Ben, Saaj Bhatt, Danish Sabri	4:19
5.	"Rasiya Balama"	Sanjeev Chaturvedi	Sanjeev–Darshan	Darshan Rathod, Payal Dev	3:38
6.	"One In Crore Remix" (Remix by DJ Dynameets)	Mellow D, Meet Bros	Meet Bros	Meet Bros, Mellow D	3:09
7.	"Pakad Pakad Remix" (Remix by DJ Dynameets)	Danish Sabri	Meet Bro	Meet Bro, Danish Sabri, Aditya Jain, Adarsh Shukla	4:06
8.	"Daga" (Amit Gupta Version)	Danish Sabri	Meet Bros	Meet Bros, Amit Gupta	4:19
Total length:					31:09

== Release ==
The film released on 21 November 2025.

== Reception ==
Mastiii 4 was panned by critics.

Prachi Arya of India Today gave 1.5 stars out of 5 and described it as "Loud, lewd and painfully lazy". Samarth Goyal of Hindustan Times also rated 1.5/5 stars and said that "A chaotic return to a tired universe, Mastiii 4 tries to masquerade desperation as comedy, resulting in a cringe-heavy ride powered more by stamina than humour." Rahul Desai of The Hollywood Reporter India stated that "Milap Zaveri’s latest plays out like a prudish porn fantasy parading as an unwatchable sex comedy."

Bollywood Hungama gave 2 stars out of 5 and said that "MASTIII 4 offers only sporadic chuckles and is otherwise bogged down by lame, recycled and needlessly crude humour. At the box office, its prospects appear extremely weak." Rachit Gupta of Filmfare rated it 1.5/5 stars and said that "Mastiii 4 to create more slaptick and sex-comedy humour, but the writing lets them down." Archika Khurana of The Times of India gave it 2.5 stars out of 5 and said that "A cringe-heavy caper made solely for lovers of low-brow humour; others won’t last long."

Vinamra Mathur of Firstpost gave rated it 0/5 stars and writes in hs review that "Our three central characters, always married to different wives and being seduced by different bimbettes as the franchise progresses and regresses, are still the same." Simran Khan of Times Now rated it 1.5 stars out of 5 and said that "The makers and the cast need to accept that crass content does not make an adult comedy. Sex comedies often face criticism, and Mastiii 4 serves as a prime example of why. This “comedy entertainer” is neither funny nor entertaining." Murtuza Iqbal of Free Press Journal also rated it 1.5/5 stars and said that "Overall, Mastiii 4 has nothing good to offer. It is not funny at all. Clearly, the weakest film in the franchise." Mayur Sanap of Rediff.com gave 1 stars and described it as a "Anything is better than Mastiii 4."
