= Kyaa Kool Hain Hum (film series) =

Film series

- Directed by: Sangeeth Sivan (1); Sachin Yardi (2); Umesh Ghadge (3)
- Written by: Sachin Yardi (1-2); Pankaj Trivedi (1); Milap Zaveri (3)
- Screenplay by: Sachin Yardi (1-2); Pankaj Trivedi (1); Mushtaq Sheikh (3)
- Story by: Sachin Yardi (1-2); Pankaj Trivedi (1); Milap Zaveri (3); Mushtaq Sheikh (3)
- Produced by: Ekta Kapoor; Shobha Kapoor
- Starring: Tusshar Kapoor; Riteish Deshmukh; Isha Koppikar (1); Neha Dhupia (1); Anupam Kher (1-2); Neha Sharma (2); Sarah Jane Dias (2); Chunky Pandey (2); Aftab Shivdasani (3); Mandana Karimi (3); Krushna Abhishek (3); Claudia Ciesla (3)
- Cinematography: Ramji (1); Anil Mehta (2); Manoj Soni (3)
- Edited by: Chirag Jain (1); Bunty Nahi (1); Aarif Sheikh (2); Nitin Rokade (3)
- Music by: Songs: Anu Malik (1); Meet Bros Anjjan (2); Sajid–Wajid (3); Score: Franco Vaz (1); Raju Singh (3)
- Production companies: Balaji Motion Pictures; ALT Entertainment (2-3)
- Distributed by: Balaji Motion Pictures
- Release dates: 6 May 2005 (1); 27 July 2012 (2); 22 January 2016 (3)
- Running time: 434 minutes
- Country: India
- Language: Hindi
- Budget: ₹55 crore
- Box office: ₹117 crore

Kyaa Kool Hain Hum (transl. 'How Cool We Are') is a series of Indian Hindi-language adult comedy film produced by Ekta Kapoor and Shobha Kapoor under their banner Balaji Motion Pictures. The first film Kyaa Kool Hai Hum is directed by Sangeeth Sivan was released in 2005. The second film Kyaa Super Kool Hain Hum is written and directed by Sachin Yardi was released in 2012. The third film Kyaa Kool Hain Hum 3 is directed by Umesh Ghadge was released in 2016. The first two films were well received by the audience but the third one was not up to the mark and became a box office bomb.

== Overview ==
=== Kyaa Kool Hai Hum (2005) ===
Rahul (Tusshar Kapoor) is sincere and hardworking whilst Karan (Riteish Deshmukh) is just the opposite. Both are best friends and cool wannabes. When the city is rocked with a series of rape and killings, the police with psychiatrist/psychologist Dr. Screwvala (Anupam Kher) is in search of this dreaded Serial Killer, and Rahul becomes the prime suspect, yet being innocent. Things take a funny turn when the job of nabbing Rahul is entrusted to a violent lady Inspector called Urmila Martodkar (Isha Koppikar). Urmila is taken to a salon and kept gagged with tape on her mouth while the doctor instructs how she has to be disguised, while she moans through the tape on her mouth. She enters Rahul's life on a pretext, and tries to seduce him into showing his true nature. Rahul falls in love with her and she loves him back, not remembering she is on a police force mission. By this time, Karan falls in love with D.K.(Rajendranath Zutshi) i.e. his boss's ex Kiran (Bobby Darling) who is actually the brother of Rekha (Neha Dhupia) a psychologist and Karan's ex-college mate.

After a roller coaster ride of mistaken identities and comedy of errors, the film reaches its peak when Karan is about to wed Kiran at the temple, but he is not aware that she is a transvestite, but Rekha and D.K. reach on time, where D.K. takes Kiran away and Rekha reveals that it was she who used to call and write letters to him on the name of Kiran, Karan realises his true love and reunites with her. The police are on the verge of arresting Rahul as the rapist, when the true rapist reveals himself, and turns out to be Uma Shankar Tripathi (Rajpal Yadav) and is arrested by police. Rahul and Urmila reunite and the film ends.

This film is based on the 1994 The Monster (Italian: Il mostro) French comedy film.

=== Kyaa Super Kool Hain Hum (2012) ===
The story follows Siddharth "Sid" Rana (Riteish Deshmukh) and Aditya "Adi" Chopra (Tusshar Kapoor), roommates and good friends. Adi is a struggling actor, whilst Sid is a struggling DJ who admires his own dog Sackru more than himself, Adi and Sid manage to meet ends by offering Sackru for mating in dog breeding centres where Sackru mates with female dogs of his breed on playing a specific music by Sid. Adi falls in love with Simran Singhania (Neha Sharma) who works at a call-center, Adi proposes Simran for marriage but she refuses and lies to him that she is lesbian, while Sid falls for Anuradha "Anu" Marlo (Sarah Jane Dias) whom he meets at a fashion show. Then Anu and Simran go to Goa to meet Anu's father, Francis Marlo (Anupam Kher) who has gone mad ever since the death of his mother. In Goa, Baba 3G (Chunky Pandey), a conman posing as a priest tells Marlo that his dead mother has been reincarnated into a female dog Rosemary. When Adi and Sid take Sackru and follow the girls to Goa and Sid meets Marlo where Sackru copulates with the female dog Rosemary.

Marlo then believes the dog is not his mother as she was so pure and didn't let her husband touch her. However, Baba 3G, who is not wanting to lose his business, tells Marlo that his father has been reincarnated as Sackru, and Sackru is then kidnapped by Marlo. Sid comes to rescue Sackru where Marlo offers Sid to host New Year's Eve as DJ and takes Sackru. Adi mistakes Anu to be partner of Simran and tells Sid about it, both get broken and decide to leave Goa with Sackru. Marlo decides to get Rosemary and Sackru married. Adi receives a message from Simran for help. Adi and Sid reach the venue of marriage, where Simran confirms Adi that she is not lesbian and both reunite, Sid with intent to take Sackru back plays the music on which Sackru runs on a mating spree in the function. A police inspector at the venue recognises Baba 3G as a criminal and arrests him. The film ends with marriage of Adi, Sid and Sackru with Simran, Anu and Rosemary.

=== Kyaa Kool Hain Hum 3 (2016) ===
Kanhaiya (Tusshar Kapoor) is a man who loses his focus whenever he sees red. In his office, a female worker accidentally drinks a love potion and she follows him into his office. Kanhaiya loses focus when he finds that she is wearing red. She urges him to have sex and lands on a printer that prints out pictures of her breasts and ass. After being kicked out by his father, Kanhaiya (Tusshar Kapoor), along with his jobless friend Rocky (Aftab Shivdasani) goes to Thailand, where Mickey (Krishna Abhishek) offers them to work in porn films. Desperate to earn money they both accept the job and kick-start their porn star career by working in adult versions of Bollywood movies such as Chennai Sexpress (Chennai Express), Kholay (Sholay), Lick (Kick), Lingam (Singham), etc., together with such other porn stars as extremely hotties, Shakuntala (Claudia Ciesla) and Meri Lee (Gizele Thakral).

In a twist of fate, Kanhaiya falls in love with Shalu (Mandana Karimi), a beautiful Indian woman who is unaware of Kanhaiya's profession. As Kanhaiya proposes to Shalu, she calls her father Surya Karjatiya (Darshan Jariwala) to meet his family. Unable to get any other solution, Kanhaiya decides to arrange a fake family out of a team of porn stars, but it soon becomes a comedy of errors as both Rocky and Mickey arrive disguised as Kanhaiya's father. Things get even funnier when Kanhaiya's real father PK Lele (Shakti Kapoor) also arrives along with his stepmother (Meghna Naidu). Kanhaiya and his team struggle to maintain the family drama, as they also secretly try to shoot their next adult movie titled Mughal-e-Orgasm (Mughal-e-Azam). But soon everyone figures out the reality when they see Kanhaiya and Rocky's porn movie collection at a local DVD store. Initially upset, Karjatiya calls off the wedding, as a result of which Kanhaiya attempts to commit suicide, causing everyone to fall into a sandpit. Mickey uses a hot air balloon to save them. Later, Karjatiya forgives Kanhaiya and allows him to marry his daughter, while Mickey decides to direct family movies only.

== Cast ==
=== Kyaa Kool Hai Hum ===
- Tusshar Kapoor as Rahul
- Riteish Deshmukh as Karan Pandey
- Isha Koppikar as Inspector Urmila Martodkar
- Neha Dhupia as Rekha
- Anupam Kher as Dr. Screwvala
- Shoma Anand as Parva
- Bobby Darling as Kiran
- Rajendranath Zutshi as D.K. Bose
- Sushmita Mukherjee as Hira Hingorani
- Anil Nagrath as Flat owner
- Dinesh Hingoo as Flat buyer
- Vijay Patkar as Constable
- Avtar Gill as Police Commissioner
- Razzak Khan as Popat (Laundry wala)
- Rana Jung Bahadur as Watchman
- Rajpal Yadav as Uma Shankar Tripathi / Rapist (Cameo appearance)
- Sophiya Chaudhary as Host of MTV Style Night (Special appearance)

=== Kyaa Super Kool Hain Hum ===
- Riteish Deshmukh as Siddharth "Sid" Rana
- Tusshar Kapoor as Aditya "Adi" Chopra
- Sarah-Jane Dias as Anuradha "Anu" Marlo
- Neha Sharma as Simran Singhania
- Anupam Kher as Francis Marlo
- Razak Khan as Popat (loundry wala)
- Chunky Pandey as Baba 3G
- Delnaaz Irani as Mrs. Dev
- Rohit Shetty as himself (Cameo)
- Nalneesh Neel as Dog thief

=== Kyaa Kool Hain Hum 3 ===
- Tusshar Kapoor as Kanhaiya
- Aftab Shivdasani as Rocky
- Mandana Karimi as Shaalu Karjatiya
  - Priya Raina as the voice of Shaalu Karjatiya
- Krishna Abhishek as Mickey
- Claudia Ciesla as Sakku (Shakuntala)
- Gizele Thakral as Sanskaar (Meri Lee)
- Darshan Jariwala as Surya Karjatiya
- Meghna Naidu as Maasi
- Shakti Kapoor as PK Lele
- Sushmita Mukherjee as Sindoor Bua
- Ritesh Deshmukh as Satya Naash (cameo)
- Danny Sura as Sundar
- Jimmy Moses as Jimmy
- Razzak Khan as Popat Laundywala (cameo)

=== Kyaa Kool Hai Hum 4 (2027) ===
- Riteish Deshmukh Aditya Bajaj “Adi”
- Tusshar Kapoor Rahul Sharma "RaaHu"
- Aftab Shivdasani Karan Deshmukh "KD"
- Sunny Leone as Sana Khanna (Yoga instructor)
- Johnny Sins as International Fitness Guru (Cameo Appearance)

== Crew ==
Occupation	Film			
Occupation	Kyaa Kool Hai Hum (2005)	Kyaa Super Kool Hain Hum (2012)	Kya Kool Hain Hum 3 (2016)	Kya Total Kool Hain Hum (2026)
Director	Sangeeth Sivan	Sachin Yardi	Umesh Ghadge	
Producer(s)	Ekta Kapoor; Shobha Kapoor	Ekta Kapoor; Shobha Kapoor	Ekta Kapoor; Shobha Kapoor	
Written By	Sachin Yardi; Pankaj Tripathi	Sachin Yardi	Milap Zaveri; Mushtaq Sheikh	
Cinematography	Ramji	Anil Mehta	Manoj Soni	
Editor	Chirag Jain; Bunty Nagi	Aarif Sheikh	Nitin Rokade	
Composer(s)	Anu Malik	Meet Bros Anjjan	Sajid–Wajid	

== Release and revenue ==
Film	Release date	Budget	Worldwide Box Office
Kyaa Kool Hai Hum	6 May 2005	₹5 crore	₹22.38 crore
Kyaa Super Kool Hain Hum	27 July 2012	₹19 crore	₹60.77 crore
Kyaa Kool Hain Hum 3	22 January 2016	₹26 crore	₹33.14 crore
Total		₹50 crore	₹116.29 crore
