= C Kkompany =

2008 Indian film by Sachin Yardi

- Theatrical release poster
- Directed by: Sachin Yardi
- Written by: Sachin Yardi
- Produced by: Ekta Kapoor; Shobha Kapoor
- Starring: Mithun Chakraborty; Tusshar Kapoor; Anupam Kher; Rajpal Yadav; Raima Sen
- Cinematography: Sanjay S. Jadhav
- Edited by: Chirag Jain; Prashant Singh Rathore
- Music by: Songs: Bappi Lahiri, Anand Raj Anand, Background Score: Sandeep Shirodkar
- Distributed by: Balaji Motion Pictures Ltd.
- Release date: 29 August 2008
- Country: India
- Language: Hindi

C Kkompany (alternatively C Company) is a 2008 Indian Hindi-language black comedy film directed by debutant Sachin Yardi, and produced by Ekta Kapoor and Shobha Kapoor. The film stars Mithun Chakraborty, Tusshar Kapoor, Rajpal Yadav, Raima Sen and Anupam Kher. It released on 29 August 2008 to negative reviews from critics, and was a failure at the box office.

== Plot ==
Three individuals - Akshay Kumar (Tusshar Kapoor), Mr. Joshi (Anupam Kher), and Lambodar Jha (Rajpal Yadav) have their own share of troubles as a common man. While Akshay is a struggling crime reporter, Mr. Joshi is a retired accountant troubled by his ungrateful son. Lambodhar works as a mascot in a mall but tells his son he has a business. Lambodhar finds it difficult to deal with his wife over his job and is very aggressive to tall people because he is very short and is often mocked for his height. Together they share their plight and find solace in each other's company.

Akshay wants to marry the love of his life, Priya (Raima Sen), the sister of a very influential gangster, Dattu Bhai. Mr. Joshi wants to get 1 crore from his son, which he claims he has a right to since Mr. Joshi has spent 1 crore raising his son. Akshay wants a portion of this money to run away from India with his girlfriend. To get this money, the trio calls Joshi's son, claiming to be from a large gang called C Kkompany, and threatens to kill his family if he does not comply. Through a series of events, this matter becomes public, and the trio tries to keep it secret. Joshi has a friend whose apartment complex is being taken down by people backed by the D Company. Joshi and Lambodhar plant a fake bomb in the car of a big underworld-backed businessman, saying that the next time, they could easily put a real bomb if the businessman does not stop the destruction of the apartment complex.

A show called "Sarkar ya C Kkompany" is aired on Zee TV, with Akshay as the anchor. In the show, people call in with their problems, and the viewers see if C Kkompany helps or the Sarkar (government). The trio initially decides to stop their extortion calls since they feel they might get caught, but after realising that people who come for help have problems way worse than theirs, they decide to help them out of sympathy. However, Dattu Bhai tries his best to discover the identity of the C Kkompany. He finds out that C Kkompany will be extorting 1 million from Joshi's son and goes to the meeting point (a carnival) to kill the C Kkompany members. He catches the trio, but is impressed and lets them go, while finally agreeing to let Priya marry Akshay.

In the end, Akshay marries Priya, with Dattu Bhai happily watching. Mr. Joshi gets his son's 1 crore Rs., and claims he got a lottery to hide the fact that he was C Kkompany and that he extorted the money. Lambodar starts his own business, and a person has to be at least 6 feet tall to work there. The three live happily ever after, and the movie ends.

The tale of C KKcompany continues, and it is found that now Sadashiv Pradhan is making the calls on C KKcompany behalf, unknown to Lambodhar, Joshi, and Akshay. Lambodhar, Joshi, and Akshay explain this to Dattubhai when questioned.

== Cast ==
- Mithun Chakraborty as Dattubhai Satellite
- Tusshar Kapoor as Akshay Kumar
- Anupam Kher as Ramakant Joshi
- Rajpal Yadav as Lambodar Jha
- Raima Sen as Priya
- Dilip Prabhawalkar as Sadashiv Pradhan
- Nikhil Ratnaparkhi as Purshottam Joshi
- Sanjay Mishra as Yadav
- Vinay Apte as Inspector Jwale
- Premchand Singh as Builder's Manager
- Raj Pandit as Aarush Jha, Lambodhar's son

Special appearances as themselves;

- Celina Jaitly in song "Speaker Baje"
- Ekta Kapoor in Balaji Telefilms
- Karan Johar in Karan Banaye Crorepati
- Mahesh Bhatt
- Sanjay Dutt in song "C Kkompany"
- Saakshi Tanwar as herself
- Disha Vakani as Asha Trivedi
- Prabhat Bhattacharya as Tv actor

Cameo appearances as themselves;(Party scene)

- Hiten Tejwani
- Gauri Pradhan Tejwani
- Vishal Sabnani
- Shriya Bisht
- Jatin Shah
- Priya Bathija
- Shubhangi Atre
- Krystle D'Souza
- Rakshanda Khan
- Ali Asgar
- Dimple Jhangiani
- Vishal Singh
- Karan Patel
- Vikas Sethi
- Pallavi Subhash

== Production ==
Sachin Yardi, who previously worked as a screenwriter for films such as Kyaa Kool Hai Hum (2005) and Traffic Signal (2007), got an idea for a story which dealt with ordinary men placed in extraordinary situations. He worked on the script for six months and invested much time on the character sketches. Speaking about his directorial debut, Yardi felt direction to be a satisfying experience and helped him have control over his script. After filming, he felt that the film was executed in the way he wanted it and was quite confident about the way it shaped up.

Until this film, Raima Sen appeared in supporting roles in several films such as Chokher Bali (2003), Parineeta (2005), and Honeymoon Travels Pvt. Ltd. (2007). This was the first time in her commercial movie career that she portrayed a lead character's role. Quite unlike her real life love for food, Sen portrays a role of a dietitian. Tusshar Kapoor, the sibling brother of producer Ekta Kapoor, loved to work in the film due to his sister's conviction to the film.

== Soundtrack ==
1. "Speaker Baje" (Dhol Mix) - Sanjay Dutt, Sunidhi Chauhan, Anand Raj Anand
2. "Jaane Kya Ho Gaya Mujhko" - Shreya Ghoshal, K. K., Bappi Lahiri
3. "Speaker Baje Speaker Baje" - Sanjay Dutt, Anand Raj Anand, Sunidhi Chauhan
4. "C Kkompany" (Remix) - Sanjay Dutt
5. "C Kkompany C Kkompany C Kkompany" - Sanjay Dutt
6. "Khoka" (Remix) - Mika Singh, Bappi Lahiri, Reema Lahiri
7. "Khokha.... Khokha Jab Haat Aayega" - Mika Singh, Reema Lahiri

== Remake ==
The film was said to have been remade in Pakistan as Na Maloom Afraad (2014). However, both the director Nabeel Qureshi and the lead actor Fahad Mustafa had denied that it was a remake, noting that the only similarity was that of three protagonists, including two young and one old, but that it had also shared with other films like Hera Pheri, while the plot is totally different.
