= Kyaa Kool Hain Hum 3 =

2016 Indian film by Umesh Ghadge

- Theatrical release poster
- Directed by: Umesh Ghadge
- Written by: Milap Zaveri
- Screenplay by: Mushtaq Sheikh
- Story by: Milap Zaveri; Mushtaq Sheikh
- Produced by: Ekta Kapoor; Shobha Kapoor
- Starring: Tusshar Kapoor; Aftab Shivdasani; Mandana Karimi; Krishna Abhishek; Gizele Thakral; Claudia Ciesla; Darshan Jariwala
- Cinematography: Manoj Soni
- Edited by: Nitin Rokade
- Music by: Sajid–Wajid; Raju Singh
- Production companies: Balaji Motion Pictures; ALT Entertainment
- Distributed by: Balaji Motion Pictures
- Release date: 22 January 2016
- Running time: 125 minutes
- Country: India
- Language: Hindi
- Budget: ₹26 crore
- Box office: ₹33.14 crore

Kyaa Kool Hain Hum 3 (transl. How cool we are 3) is a 2016 Indian Hindi-language sex comedy film starring Tusshar Kapoor, Aftab Shivdasani and Mandana Karimi in lead roles along with Gizele Thakral, Claudia Ciesla, Krishna Abhishek, Shakti Kapoor, Darshan Jariwala in pivotal roles. It was released on January 22, 2016. The film is a sequel to 2005's Kyaa Kool Hai Hum and 2012's Kyaa Super Kool Hain Hum, and is the third installment of the Kyaa Kool Hain Hum film series.

== Plot ==
Kanhaiya is an innocent man looking for his true love. His best friend Rocky, however, is far from innocent and sleeps around. Kanhaiya walks into his job and is greeted by a woman wearing red, and he loses his focus. The woman unknowingly drinks a coffee mixed with a powder which makes people horny and walks into his office in an urge to have sex. He retaliates, and amidst their scuffle, she lands on a photocopier. Later during the meeting, close pictures of her body are shown, making Kanhaiya's father, Mr PK Lele, furious and fire him. Rocky tells him that he can impress his father during his grandmother's 69th birthday. There, Rocky brings a very inappropriate cake, infuriating PK and Kanhaiya's step-mother. Kanhaiya asks him to buy a gift for his grandmother. After shopping online, he starts watching porn and masturbating while Kanhaiya and his grandmother walk in, and she dies of a heart attack, resulting in Kanhaiya getting kicked out of his house.

The two get a call from their childhood friend, Mickey, who lives in Thailand, inviting them both to take part in his business of making porn parodies of popular Indian movies. Kanhaiya refuses to work in an inappropriate job but agrees after a lot of convincing. Along with Mickey's other actor friends, Merili, Shakuntala, and others, they start making porn parody films.

One day at a mall, Kanhaiya finds a girl, Shalu, immediately falling in love with her, but she mistakes him for a pervert and leaves in disgust. Later, on a beach, they meet, and he clears the misunderstandings. The two start dating while Shalu has no idea about Kanhaiya's job, and he proposes to her, saying that he is rich. In response, Shalu reveals that she and her father, who prefers traditions, would like to meet his family before their wedding. Unable to find any other solution, Kanhaiya decides to arrange a fake family out of his actor friends. Shalu and her father, Mr Karjatiya, arrive and are greeted by the fake family, and Kanhaiya manages to convince them. Mickey arrives, posing as Kanhaiya's father, while unknowingly, Rocky also poses as his father. They manage to lie and convince that Rocky is his biological father and Mickey just took care of him. Karjatiya's mute wife, Sindoor, also arrives with her nephew, Jimmy, who translates whatever she says. Suddenly, Kanhaiya's actual father arrives with his stepmother after being called by Rocky, and the three lie that Kanhaiya's stepmother is his actual mother, who left Rocky for another man. The actors mess things up.

Amidst the chaos, they realise that they can't shoot more films now. However, they decide to do it secretly, but almost get caught when Sindoor and Jimmy walk in during their shoot. Later, while everyone is having dinner, the actors start getting frisky under the table while Sindoor gets attracted to Mickey and Kanhaiya's stepmother to Rocky. Karjatiya mixes a powder in Rocky and the stepmother's dessert to rekindle their love, believing their lie, which makes Kanhaiya's stepmother horny. In the middle of the night, she sneaks into Rocky's room while he is sleeping with Merili to have sex. The actors also sneak inside each other's rooms to have sex, and Kanhaiya finds Shalu also seducing him. They all barely manage not to get caught by Karjatiya.

Rocky and Kanhaiya realise that this has been all Karjatiya's doing, and Rocky devises another plan. He lies to Karjatiya that he has a girlfriend, Vidya, and doesn't love his first wife anymore. To make matters worse, Karjatiya demands to meet Vidya later when the family goes for a beach picnic. There, Kanhaiya dresses as a woman and poses as Vidya to convince Karjatiya, who gets attracted to him along with Kanhaiya's father. When they question Kanhaiya's disappearance, Vidya lies that he is in the mall, resulting in everyone going to the mall looking for him. Kanhaiya and Rocky are terrified to find DVDs of their films in the same store in the mall as the family and quickly decide to buy all of them to hide them. The shop owner delays, and in a scuffle, the DVDs get scattered around. Everyone learns about the duo's dirty business, and Karjatiya calls off the wedding. Upon hearing this, Vidya (Kanhaiya) decides to kill himself and runs to the beach where he, Rocky, PK, Karjatiya, and Sindoor get stuck in quicksand, and they figure out that Vidya is Kanhaiya. Mickey and Shalu arrive in a hot air balloon to their rescue after being informed by Karjatiya's parrot, and they successfully save everyone. After everyone accepts their mistakes, Karjatiya forgives Kanhaiya and allows him to marry Shalu, while Mickey decides to direct family movies only.

== Cast ==
- Tusshar Kapoor as Kanhaiya
- Aftab Shivdasani as Rocky
- Mandana Karimi as Shaalu Karjatiya
  - Priya Raina as the voice of Shaalu Karjatiya
- Krishna Abhishek as Mickey
- Claudia Ciesla as Sakku/Shakuntala
- Gizele Thakral as Sanskaar/Meri Lee
- Darshan Jariwala as Surya Karjatiya
- Meghna Naidu as Maasi
- Shakti Kapoor as PK Lele
- Sushmita Mukherjee as Sindoor Bua
- Ritesh Deshmukh as Satya Naash (cameo)
- VJ Andy
- Danny Sura as Sundar
- Jimmy Moses as Jimmy
- Dinky Kapoor as the sexy secretary in the office of Kanhaiya
- Gauahar Khan in a special appearance in the song "Jawaani Le Doobi"
- Razzak Khan in a cameo as Popat Laundrywala

== Soundtrack ==
Kyaa Kool Hain Hum 3

Soundtrack album by Sajid-Wajid
- Released: 5 January 2016
- Genre: Feature film soundtrack
- Length: 16:29
- Language: Hindi
- Label: Zee Music Company
- Producer: Ekta Kapoor

Sajid-Wajid chronology
Singh Is Bling (2015)	Kyaa Kool Hain Hum 3 (2016)	Freaky Ali (2016)

Track listing
No.	Title	Lyrics	Singer(s)	Length
1.	"Jawaani Le Doobi"	Danish Sabri	Kanika Kapoor, Ikka, Uvie	4:14
2.	"Oh Boy"	Irfan Kamal	Wajid Khan and Shivranjani Singh	4:00
3.	"House Party"	Danish Sabri	Sajid Khan, Shalmali Kholgade and Wajid Khan	3:57
4.	"Kya Kool Hain Hum 3 (Title Track)"	Danish Sabri	Benny Dayal and Shivranjani Singh	4:02
Total length:				16:29

== Critical reception ==
On the review aggregator website Rotten Tomatoes, Kya kool hain hum 3 has a rating of 0% from 9 critics, with an average score of 3/10.
