= List of awards and nominations received by Riteish Deshmukh =

Riteish Deshmukh awards and nominations
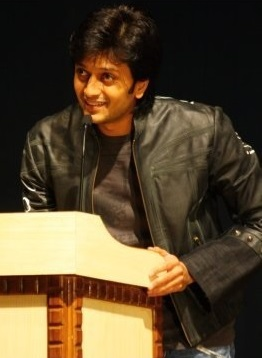
- Deshmukh at Sympulse 2010
Awards and nominations
Award	Wins	Nominations
National Film Awards	1	0
Filmfare Awards	0	4
Screen Awards	1	2
Zee Cine Awards	3	4
IIFA Awards	4	4
Stardust Awards	1	0
BIG Star Entertainment Awards	1	0
Producers Guild Film Awards	1	1
Filmfare Awards Marathi	1	4
Maharashtracha Favourite Kon?	5	6
Other awards	8	2

Totals (Note: Certain award groups do not simply award one winner. They acknowledge several different recipients, have runners-up, and have third place. Since this is a specific recognition and is different from losing an award, runner-up mentions are considered wins in this award tally. For simplification and to avoid errors, each award in this list has been presumed to have had a prior nomination.)
- Wins: 26
- Nominations: 27

Riteish Vilasrao Deshmukh (born 17 December 1978) is an Indian film actor, producer and architect. He is known for his work in Hindi and Marathi cinema.

Deshmukh debuted with K. Vijaya Bhaskar's Tujhe Meri Kasam (2003) opposite Genelia D'Souza, but it was not until 2004 that he achieved huge popularity, when he appeared in the commercially successful comedy Masti and the critically acclaimed Bardaasht.

Since then, Deshmukh has starred in many commercially successful films such as Kya Kool Hai Hum, Bluffmaster!, Malamaal Weekly, Heyy Babyy, Dhamaal, Housefull, Tere Naal Love Ho Gaya, Housefull 2, Grand Masti, Ek Villain, and Housefull 3.

In January 2013, Deshmukh made his debut as a film producer with the Marathi success Balak Palak, directed by Ravi Jadhav. The following year he made his acting debut in Marathi cinema with the action film Lai Bhaari.

== Awards and nominations ==
Year	Award	Category	Nominated work	Result	Ref.
2004	Screen Awards	Most Promising Newcomer – Male	Tujhe Meri Kasam	Nominated	
2004	Zee Cine Awards	Best Male Debut	Out of Control	Nominated	
2005	Zee Cine Awards	Best Comedian	Masti	Won	
2005	Screen Awards	Best Comedian	Masti	Won	
2005	IIFA Awards	Best Performance in a Comic Role	Masti	Nominated	
2006	Stardust Awards	Best Supporting Actor	Kyaa Kool Hai Hum	Won	
2006	Zee Cine Awards	Best Comedian	Bluffmaster!	Won	
2006	IIFA Awards	Best Performance in a Comic Role	Bluffmaster!	Nominated	
2008	Zee Cine Awards	Entertainer of the Year	—N/a	Won	
2011	IIFA Awards	Best Performance in a Comic Role	Housefull	Won	
2011	Producers Guild Film Awards	Best Performance in a Comic Role	Housefull	Nominated	
2011	Zee Cine Awards	Best Performance in a Comic Role	Housefull	Nominated	
2012	IIFA Awards	Best Performance in a Comic Role	Double Dhamaal	Won	
2013	Producers Guild Film Awards	Best Performance in a Comic Role	Kya Super Kool Hain Hum	Nominated	
2013	Bollywood Hungama Surfers' Choice Movie Awards	Best Performance in a Comic Role	Kya Super Kool Hain Hum	Nominated	
2013	Zee Cine Awards	Best Performance in a Comic Role	Housefull 2	Nominated	
2014	IIFA Awards	Best Performance in a Comic Role	Grand Masti	Nominated	
2014	BIG Star Entertainment Awards	Most Entertaining Actor in a Thriller Film – Male	Ek Villain	Won	
2014	Star Box Office India Awards	Game Changer of The Year	—N/a	Won	
2014	Maharashtracha Favourite Kon?	Favourite Actor	Lai Bhaari	Won	
2014	Maharashtracha Favourite Kon?	Favourite Style Icon	—N/a	Won	
2014	Zee Cine Awards	Best Actor in a Comic Role	Grand Masti	Nominated	
2014	Filmfare Awards Marathi	Best Male Debut	Lai Bhaari	Won	
2014	National Awards	Special Jury Award	Yellow	Won	
2015	Filmfare Awards	Best Supporting Actor	Ek Villain	Nominated	
2015	Star Guild Awards	Best Performance in a Negative Role	Ek Villain	Won	
2015	Screen Awards	Best Villain	Ek Villain	Nominated	
2015	Zee Gaurav Awards	Best Actor	Lai Bhaari	Won	
2015	Marathi International Cinema & Theatre Awards (MICTA)	Best Actor	Lai Bhaari	Won	
2015	IIFA Awards	Best Actor In A Supporting Role	Ek Villain	Won	
2015	IIFA Awards	Best Performance in a Negative Role	Ek Villain	Nominated	
2015	IIFA Awards	Outstanding Performance By A Regional Language Film	Lai Bhaari	Won	
2015	Bollywood Hungama Surfers' Choice Movie Awards	Best Performance in a Negative Role	Ek Villain	Won	
2016	Ghanta Awards	Worst Actor	Bangistan	Nominated	
2016	BIG Star Entertainment Awards	Most Entertaining Actor in a Comedy film	Housefull 3	Nominated	
2020	Zee Cine Awards	Best Actor in a Negative Role	Marjaavaan	Nominated	
2023	7th Filmfare Awards Marathi	Best Director	Ved	Nominated	
2023	7th Filmfare Awards Marathi	Best Actor	Ved	Nominated	
2023	Maharashtracha Favourite Kon?	Favourite Style Icon	Ved	Won	
2023	Maharashtracha Favourite Kon?	Trend Setter of the Year	Ved	Won	
2023	Zee Chitra Gaurav Puraskar	Viewer's Choice Best Film	Ved	Won	
2023	Zee Chitra Gaurav Puraskar	Best Actor	Ved	Nominated	
2023	IIFA Awards	Outstanding Performance in Regional Cinema	Ved	Won	

== See also ==
- Riteish Deshmukh filmography
