= Balaji Motion Pictures =

21st century Indian film studio

- Type: Private
- Industry: Entertainment
- Founded: 2001
- Founder: Jeetendra
- Headquarters: Mumbai, India
- Key people: Shobha Kapoor; Ekta Kapoor; Nachiket Pantvaidya
- Products: Film; Music
- Owner: Balaji Telefilms
- Website: balajitelefilms.com

Balaji Motion Pictures is an Indian film production and distribution company, subsidiary company of Balaji Telefilms Limited, established by Shobha Kapoor and her daughter Ekta Kapoor. Located in Mumbai, it produces and distributes Hindi films. The chairman of the company is former Bollywood actor, Jeetendra Kapoor. In 2017, the company released its biography, Kingdom of the Soap Queen: The Story of Balaji Telefilms.

== Operations ==
Balaji Motion Pictures is based in Mumbai in the Balaji House on New Link Road, Andheri West, Mumbai. It operates from its head office in Andheri West and has studios in Film City and other locations in Mumbai.

== History ==
Balaji Motion Pictures was set up in 2001 by Hindi television producer Ekta Kapoor with the purpose of venturing into film production. She produced Kyo Kii... Main Jhuth Nahin Bolta, released in 2001 with Govinda and Sushmita Sen in the lead roles. The film was a failure at the box office, collecting ₹13 crore (US$1.4 million). Later, the company produced Kucch To Hai (2003), Krishna Cottage (2004) and Koi Aap Sa (2005), all of which did not fare well at the box office.

In 2005, the company produced and released Kyaa Kool Hai Hum, which grossed ₹21.5 crore (US$2.3 million) and made it to the top 10 Indian films of 2005 by Box Office India.

In 2007, the company co-produced Shootout at Lokhandwala with Sanjay Gupta. It was a critical and commercial success, collecting ₹68.17 crore (US$7.3 million) worldwide.

In 2008, the company produced and released C Kkompany, which was a critical and commercial failure. In the same year, the company co-produced Mission Istanbul and EMI – Liya Hai Toh Chukana Parega with Sunil Shetty. Both films failed critically and commercially. In the same year, the company acquired the distribution rights of Bhool Bhulaiyaa (2007) and Sarkar Raj (2008) with a deal of almost ₹40 crore (US$4.3 million). The films were both commercially successful, thereby making a step further for Balaji.

In 2010, the company's sub-branded ALT Entertainment, a youth-focused brand, produced a low-budget film, Love Sex aur Dhokha, which was a sleeper hit at the box office. In the same year, the company released Once Upon a Time in Mumbaai, which was also a critical and commercial success. This film marked the company's successful entry into film industry.

In 2011, the company marked its entry into Marathi films by producing Taryanche Bait. The film was a critical and commercial hit and won many accolades including three awards for Best Film. The company also released Shor in the City, a small-budget critically acclaimed film. The same year also saw the release of Ragini MMS, co-produced with Amit Kapoor and Sidhartha M. Jain. The film won the Stardust Award for Best Film, and Ekta Kapoor announced the sequel of the film would be released in 2013, starring Indo-Canadian actress Sunny Leone. The company released The Dirty Picture starring Vidya Balan on 2 December 2011. This proved to be a major blockbuster and was regarded as one of the best films of 2011, winning Vidya Balan her first National Award and numerous acting awards of 2011 for her performance. The film won six awards for Best Film.

In 2012, the company released its first adult comedy, Kyaa Super Kool Hai Hum, sequel to the 2005 hit Kyaa Kool Hai Hum, which was slammed by critics but was a box office success, made on a budget of ₹13 crore (US$1.4 million) and collecting ₹33 crore (US$3.5 million) in its first week.

In April 2013, the company released the horror film Ek Thi Daayan, co-produced with Vishal Bhardwaj. It received positive reviews from critics and received 3 out of 5 on average. Jinson John of Indian Box Office stated "Ek Thi Daayan is not that regular Bhootiya story, the plot stands out of them all, it's surely is an experimental plot, but not written by an idiot." The film opened at around 30–40% occupancy, with a better opening in multiplexes rather than single screens, netting around ₹18.07 crore (US$1.9 million) over the first weekend.

In May 2013, the company released Shootout at Wadala. The film opened to mixed-to-positive reviews. Bollywood Hungama rated the film with stars whereas The Times of India rated it stars. Made on a shoestring budget of ₹26 crore (US$2.8 million), the film grossed ₹54.6 crore (US$5.8 million) worldwide. The film was declared "average" by Box Office India. In July 2013, the company released Lootera, starring Sonakshi Sinha and Ranveer Singh as leads. It opened to positive reviews from critics. Taran Adarsh of Bollywood Hungama rated the film stars, saying, "On the whole, LOOTERA is an intrinsically earnest and profoundly heartwarming story that stays in your heart. An absolute must for those who love romantic films or are romantic at heart. This one's a cinematic gem!" Raja Sen of Rediff.com gave it stars and noted, "Lootera is a gorgeous, gorgeous film, one that uses its period setting affectionately, with loving detail, and not exploitative as our cinema wont to do." Meena Iyer of The Times of India assigned the film stars and noted, "Lootera is a love saga of yore... You may find this film boring if state-of-the-art, slow romance is not your idea of a movie outing." The film was made on a budget of ₹27 crore (US$2.9 million) and netted ₹38 crore (US$4.1 million) worldwide in its lifetime.

In August 2013, the company released Once Upon ay Time in Mumbai Dobaara!, the sequel to one of its most successful films, Once Upon a Time in Mumbaai. The film opened to negative reviews from critics, some of whom slammed it for its poor drafting and execution of storyline. The film was made on a high budget of ₹85 crore (US$9.1 million) to ₹100 crore (US$11 million) and collected ₹70 crore (US$7.5 million) worldwide, thereby netting a loss, and was declared a "flop".

On February 28, 2014, the company released Shaadi Ke Side Effects starring Farhan Akhtar and Vidya Balan. It opened to positive reviews and collected ₹5.7 crore (US$610,000) on its first day. It grossed ₹21.2 crore (US$2.3 million) in its opening weekend. It grossed ₹70 crore (US$7.5 million) worldwide during its lifetime run and was declared "below average" by Box Office India.

On March 21, 2014, the company released Ragini MMS 2, starring Sunny Leone, the sequel to another successful film of the company, Ragini MMS. Made on a budget of ₹18 crore (US$1.9 million), the film opened to mixed reviews from critics and went on to collect ₹65 crore (US$6.9 million). The film was a major commercial success and was declared a "hit" by Box Office India.

On April 4, 2014, the company released Main Tera Hero, starring Varun Dhawan as the protagonist, directed by David Dhawan. It received positive reviews from critics. Taran Adarsh of Bollywood Hungama rated it stars, and wrote "On the whole, Main Tera Hero is a wild, wacky, madcap entertainer that has the unmistakable stamp of the master of entertainers – David Dhawan. An over-the-top plot, humor quotient and performances are three aces the film stands on. The film should work well with admirers of typical Bollywood masalathons, also because Varun Dhawan pulls off the act with flamboyance and bowls you over with an uproarious act in this zany entertainer. Go, have fun and laugh out loud!" Srijana Mitra Das of The Times of India gave the movie stars, saying, "Main Tera Hero is a pav bhaji picture, quick, spicy, hot. It has the depth of a comic strip but it also has its neon-shaded fun. For those who want a light laugh, here's your boy." Made on a budget of ₹42.5 crore (US$4.5 million), the movie went on to collect ₹77 crore (US$8.2 million) worldwide and was declared a "hit" by Box Office India.

On May 30, 2014, the company released the small-budget film Kuku Mathur Ki Jhand Ho Gayi, co-produced by Bejoy Nambiar. It opened to mixed reviews from critics and also failed to collect at the box office. It collected a mere ₹3 crore (US$320,000), thereby recovering its costs.

In June 2014, the company released Ek Villain co-starring celebrities Sidharth Malhotra, Shraddha Kapoor and Riteish Deshmukh. It opened up to positive reviews from critics. Taran Adarsh of Bollywood Hungama awarded the movie 4/5 stars and wrote, "On the whole, Ek Villain is a stylish, spellbinding and terrifying edge-of-the-seat thriller. It's a step forward in this genre, without a doubt. A sure-shot winner!" Radita Tandon from Filmfare gave the film stars and noted that, "Though indulgent in parts, Ek Villain packs in a punch. Copy of a Korean film or not, it's 'good' paisa vasool entertainment. Make it your weekend watch." Meena Iyer of The Times of India gave the film stars, stating that "You cannot fault the scale of Ek Villain or berate its lead star cast. But you wish you could celebrate this thriller like you did Suri's last movie outing Aashiqui 2." The film, made on a budget of ₹35 crore (US$3.7 million), went on to collect ₹105.05 crore (US$11 million) in India and grossed ₹135 crore (US$14 million) (approx.) with a distributor share of ₹49.75 crore (US$5.3 million) itself in India. The film was declared a "super hit" by Box Office India.

== Film production ==
List of Balaji Motion Pictures film productions
Year	Title	Director(s)	Cast	Languages	Genre	Notes
2001	Kyo Kii... Main Jhuth Nahin Bolta	David Dhawan	Govinda, Sushmita Sen, Rambha	Hindi	Comedy	
2003	Kucch To Hai	Anurag Basu; Anil V. Kumar	Tusshar Kapoor, Esha Deol, Anita Hassanandani, Yash Tonk	Hindi	Horror	
2004	Krishna Cottage	Santram Verma	Sohail Khan, Isha Koppikar, Anita Hassanandani Reddy	Hindi	Horror	
2005	Kyaa Kool Hai Hum	Sangeeth Sivan	Tusshar Kapoor, Riteish Deshmukh, Isha Koppikar, Neha Dhupia	Hindi	Comedy; Thriller	
2005	Koi Aap Sa	Partho Mitra	Aftab Shivdasani, Anita Hassanandani, Dipannita Sharma, Himanshu Malik	Hindi	Romance	
2007	Shootout at Lokhandwala	Apoorva Lakhia	Amitabh Bachchan, Sanjay Dutt, Sunil Shetty, Vivek Oberoi, Arbaaz Khan, Amrita Singh, Tusshar Kapoor, Rohit Roy	Hindi	Crime	
2008	Mission Istanbul	Apoorva Lakhia	Vivek Oberoi, Shriya Saran, Zayed Khan	Hindi	Crime	Co-produced with Popcorn Motion Pictures
2008	C Kkompany	Sachin Yardi	Tusshar Kapoor, Anupam Kher, Rajpal Yadav, Raima Sen	Hindi	Comedy	
2008	EMI – Liya Hai Toh Chukana Parega	Saurabh Kabra	Arjun Rampal, Sanjay Dutt, Urmila Matondkar, Malaika Arora Khan, Aashish Chaudhary, Neha Oberoi	Hindi	Social	Co-produced with Popcorn Motion Pictures
2010	Love Sex Aur Dhokha	Dibakar Banerjee	Anshuman Jha, Nushrat Bharucha, Sandeep Bose, Rajkummar Rao	Hindi	Found footage	
2010	Once Upon a Time in Mumbaai	Milan Luthria	Ajay Devgn, Emraan Hashmi, Kangana Ranaut, Prachi Desai	Hindi	Gangster	
2011	Taryanche Bait	Kiran Yadnyopavit	Vinay Apte, Sachin Khedekar, Ashwini Giri, Ashmita Joglekar	Marathi	Drama	
2011	Shor in the City	Raj Nidimoru; Krishna D.K.	Sendhil Ramamurthy, Tusshar Kapoor, Nikhil Dwivedi	Hindi	Drama	
2011	Ragini MMS	Pawan Kripalani	Rajkummar Rao, Kainaz Motivala	Hindi	Horror; Thriller	Co-produced with iRock Films
2011	The Dirty Picture	Milan Luthria	Vidya Balan, Emraan Hashmi, Tusshar Kapoor, Naseeruddin Shah	Hindi	Biographic	
2012	Kyaa Super Kool Hai Hum	Sachin Yardi	Tusshar Kapoor, Riteish Deshmukh, Neha Sharma	Hindi	Comedy	
2013	Ek Thi Daayan	Kannan Iyer	Emraan Hashmi, Konkana Sen Sharma, Huma Qureshi, Kalki Koechlin	Hindi	Thriller	Co-produced with VB Pictures
2013	Shootout at Wadala	Sanjay Gupta	Anil Kapoor, John Abraham, Kangana Ranaut, Manoj Bajpayee, Tusshar Kapoor	Hindi	Gangster; Crime	Prequel and Sequel to Shootout at Lokhandwala (2007); Co-produced with White Feather Films
2013	Lootera	Vikramaditya Motwane	Ranveer Singh, Sonakshi Sinha	Hindi	Romance	Co-produced with Phantom Films
2013	Once Upon a Time In Mumbaai Dobara	Milan Luthria	Akshay Kumar, Imran Khan, Sonakshi Sinha	Hindi	Crime; Romance	Sequel to Once Upon a Time in Mumbaai (2010)
2014	Shaadi Ke Side Effects	Saket Chaudhary	Farhan Akhtar, Vidya Balan	Hindi	Romcom	Sequel to Pyaar Ke Side Effects; Co-produced with Pritish Nandy Communications
2014	Ragini MMS 2	Bhushan Patel	Sunny Leone	Hindi	Horror; Thriller	Sequel to Ragini MMS
2014	Main Tera Hero	David Dhawan	Varun Dhawan, Ileana D'Cruz, Nargis Fakhri	Hindi	Romance	
2014	Kuku Mathur Ki Jhand Ho Gayi	Aman Sachdeva	Siddharth Gupta, Simran Kaur Mundi	Hindi	Comedy; Romance	Co-produced with Bejoy Nambiar
2014	Ek Villain — There's one in every love story	Mohit Suri	Sidharth Malhotra, Riteish Deshmukh, Shraddha Kapoor	Hindi	Romance; Thriller	
2016	Kyaa Kool Hain Hum 3	Umesh Ghadge	Tusshar Kapoor, Aftab Shivdasani, Mandana Karimi	Hindi	Adult comedy	
2016	Azhar	Tony D'Souza	Emraan Hashmi, Nargis Fakhri, Prachi Desai, Lara Dutta	Hindi	Biopic	Co-produced with Sony Pictures Networks
2016	Udta Punjab	Abhishek Chaubey	Shahid Kapoor, Alia Bhatt, Kareena Kapoor, Diljit Dosanjh	Hindi	Crime; Drama	Co-produced with Phantom Films
2016	Great Grand Masti	Indra Kumar	Vivek Oberoi, Ritesh Deshmukh, Aftab Shivdasani, Urvashi Rautela	Hindi	Adult comedy	
2016	A Flying Jatt	Remo D'Souza, Priyadarshan	Tiger Shroff, Jacqueline Fernandez	Hindi	Superhero, Romance	
2017	Half Girlfriend	Mohit Suri	Arjun Kapoor, Shraddha Kapoor	Hindi	Romance	
2017	Super Singh	Anurag Singh	Diljit Dosanjh, Sonam Bajwa	Punjabi	Superhero, Drama	Co-produced with Brat Films
2018	Veere Di Wedding	Shashanka Ghosh	Kareena Kapoor, Sonam Kapoor, Swara Bhaskar, Shikha Talsania, Sumeet Vyas	Hindi	Comedy-drama	Co-produced with Anil Kapoor Films
2018	Laila Majnu	Sajid Ali	Mir Sarwar, Avinash Tiwary, Abrar Qazi, Saransh, Tripti Dimri, Ruchikaa Kapoor	Hindi	Romance, Drama	Co-production with PI Pictures
2019	Judgementall Hai Kya	Prakash Kovelamudi	Kangana Ranaut, Rajkummar Rao	Hindi	Comedy, Thriller	Co-produced with Karma Media and Entertainment; and ALT Entertainment
2019	Jabariya Jodi	Prashant Singh	Sidharth Malhotra, Parineeti Chopra	Hindi	Romance, Comedy	Co-produced with Karma Media and Entertainment; and ALT Entertainment
2019	Dream Girl	Raaj Shaandilyaa	Ayushman Khurrana, Nushrat Bharucha	Hindi	Comedy, Humour	Co-produced with ALT Entertainment; and Zee Studios
2022	Ek Villain Returns	Mohit Suri	John Abraham, Arjun Kapoor, Disha Patani, Tara Sutaria	Hindi	Thriller	
2022	Goodbye	Vikas Bahl	Amitabh Bachchan, Rashmika Mandanna	Hindi	Drama	
2022	Dobaaraa	Anurag Kashyap	Taapsee Pannu	Hindi	Thriller	
2023	Dream Girl 2	Raaj Shaandilyaa	Ayushmann Khurrana, Ananya Panday, Paresh Rawal, Seema Pahwa, Manjot Singh, Vijay Raaz, Annu Kapoor, Rajpal Yadav, Abhishek Banerjee, Asrani	Hindi	Comedy	
2023	Thank You for Coming	Karan Boolani	Bhumi Pednekar, Shehnaaz Gill, Dolly Singh, Kusha Kapila, Shibani Bedi	Hindi	Social Comedy	
2024	Crew	Rajesh A Krishnan	Tabu, Kareena Kapoor, Kriti Sanon, Diljit Dosanjh	Hindi	Comedy drama	
2024	Love Sex Aur Dhokha 2	Dibakar Banerjee	Paritosh Tiwari, Bonita Rajpurohit, Abhinav Singh, Swastika Mukherjee, Mouni Roy, Uorfi Javed	Hindi	Anthology drama	
2024	The Buckingham Murders	Hansal Mehta	Kareena Kapoor, Rukku Nahar, Keith Allen, Ash Tandon, Jonathan Nyati	Hindi	Mystery Thriller	Premiere at the 67th BFI London Film Festival
2024	Binny And Family	Sanjay Tripathi	Rajesh Kumar, Charu Shankar, Pankaj Kapur, Himani Shivpuri	Hindi	Comedy Satire	Co-produced with Mahaveer Jain Films and Waveband Productions
2024	Vicky Vidya Ka Woh Wala Video	Raaj Shaandilyaa	Rajkumar Rao, Tripti Dimri	Hindi	Comedy	Co-produced by T-Series, Kathavachak Films and Wakaoo Films
2024	The Sabarmati Report	Dheeraj Sarna	Vikrant Massey, Raashii Khanna, Riddhi Dogra	Hindi	Thriller Drama	Co-Produced by Vikir Films Production
2025	Mastiii 4	Milap Zaveri	Riteish Deshmukh, Aftab Shivdasani, Vivek Oberoi, Arshad Warsi, Tusshar Kapoor	Hindi	Adult comedy	Co-produced with Zee Studios, Maruti International and Sri Adhikari Brothers
2025	Vrusshabha	Nanda Kishore	Mohanlal, Roshan Meka, Siddique, Meena, Zahrah S. Khan, Shanaya Kapoor, Shine Tom Chacko, Joju George, Meka Srikanth,	Telugu/ Malayalam	Action Fantasy Drama	
2026	Bhooth Bangla	Priyadarshan	Akshay Kumar, Tabu, Paresh Rawal, Wamiqa Gabbi, Asrani, Mithila Palkar, Rajpal Yadav, Jisshu Sengupta, Manoj Joshi, Rajesh Sharma	Hindi	Comedy horror	Co-produced with Cape of Good Films
2026	The Vvaan: Force of the Forrest	Deepak Kumar Mishra	Sidharth Malhotra, Tamannaah Bhatia, Maniesh Paul, Sunil Grover, Shweta Tiwari, Anup Soni	Hindi	Thriller	Co-produced with TVF Motion Pictures and 11:11 Productions
Released on OTT Platforms
2020	Dolly Kitty Aur Woh Chamakte Sitare	Alankrita Shrivastava	Konkona Sen Sharma, Bhumi Pednekar	Hindi	Comedy satire	Released on Netflix
2021	Pagglait	Umesh Bist	Sanya Malhotra, Shruti Sharma, Ashlesha Thakur	Hindi	Comedy	Released on Netflix
2022	Freddy	Shashanka Ghosh	Kartik Aaryan, Alaya F	Hindi	Thriller	Released on Disney+ Hotstar
2023	U Turn	Arif Khan	Alaya F	Hindi	Thriller	Released on ZEE5
2023	Kathal	Yashowardhan Mishra	Sanya Malhotra, Anant V Joshi, Vijay Raaz	Hindi	Satirical comedy thriller	Released on Netflix
2023	Jaane Jaan	Sujoy Ghosh	Kareena Kapoor Khan, Jaideep Ahlawat, Vijay Varma	Hindi	Crime thriller	Released on Netflix

=== Upcoming films ===
List of Balaji Motion Pictures upcoming film productions
Year	Title	Director(s)	Cast	Languages	Genre	Notes
Under the banner BALAJI MOTION PICTURES
2027	Hero Ki Horrorine	Sajid Khan	Yashvardhan Ahuja, Nitanshi Goel, Sunita Ahuja, Jamie Lever, Chunky Panday, Brijendra Kala, Simrat Kaur	Hindi	Comedy horror	Co-produced with Jai Ho Media Ventures

== Film distribution ==
List of Balaji Motion Pictures film distributions
#	Year	Title	Director	Notes
1	2007	Darling	Ram Gopal Varma	
2	2007	Bhool Bhulaiyaa	Priyadarshan	
3	2008	Sarkar Raj	Ram Gopal Varma	
4	2013	Vishwaroop	Kamal Haasan	
5	2017	Lipstick Under My Burkha	Alankrita Shrivastava	
6	2022	Jersey	Gowtam Tinnanuri	
