= Taryanche Bait =

- Theatrical Poster
- Directed by: Kiran Yadnyopavit
- Written by: Saurabh Bhave; Shailesh Dupare; Kiran Yagnopavit
- Produced by: Ekta Kapoor; Shobha Kapoor; Neeraj Pandey; Shital Bhatia; Co Producer; Nitin Chandrachud
- Starring: Sachin Khedekar; Vinay Apte; Ashwini Giri; Ashmita Joglekar
- Cinematography: Sudhir Palsane
- Edited by: Shree Narayan Singh
- Music by: Nandu Ghanekar
- Production companies: ALT Entertainment; Balaji Motion Pictures; Friday Filmworks
- Release date: 14 April 2011
- Country: India
- Language: Marathi

Taryanche Bait (Marathi: ताऱ्यांचे बेट, English: Island of Stars) is a 2011 Marathi film directed by Kiran Yadnyopavit starring Sachin Khedekar, Vinay Apte, Ashwini Giri and Ashmita Joglekar in lead roles.

== Cast ==
- Vinay Apte
- Ashwini Giri
- Ashmita Joglekar as Meera
- Kishore Kadam
- Sachin Khedekar
- Shashank Shende as Mahadaa
- Ishaan Tambe as Omkar
- Bhushan Mehare as Vithal

== Reception ==
Taryanche Bait received positive reviews from critics. Marathimovieworld gave the film a positive review saying, "'Taryanche Bait' - reminds about values, Thanks to Kiran Yadnyopavit, Neeraj Pande and Ekta Kapoor for such a wonderful offering" and praise acting talent of Sachin Khedkar as a father in the film.

The Indian Express gave the film a 3 star rating out of 5 praising Ektaa's effort in Marathi film industry saying, "Ekta Kapoor of Motion Pictures forays into Marathi cinema and we hope she continues to make many more such films."

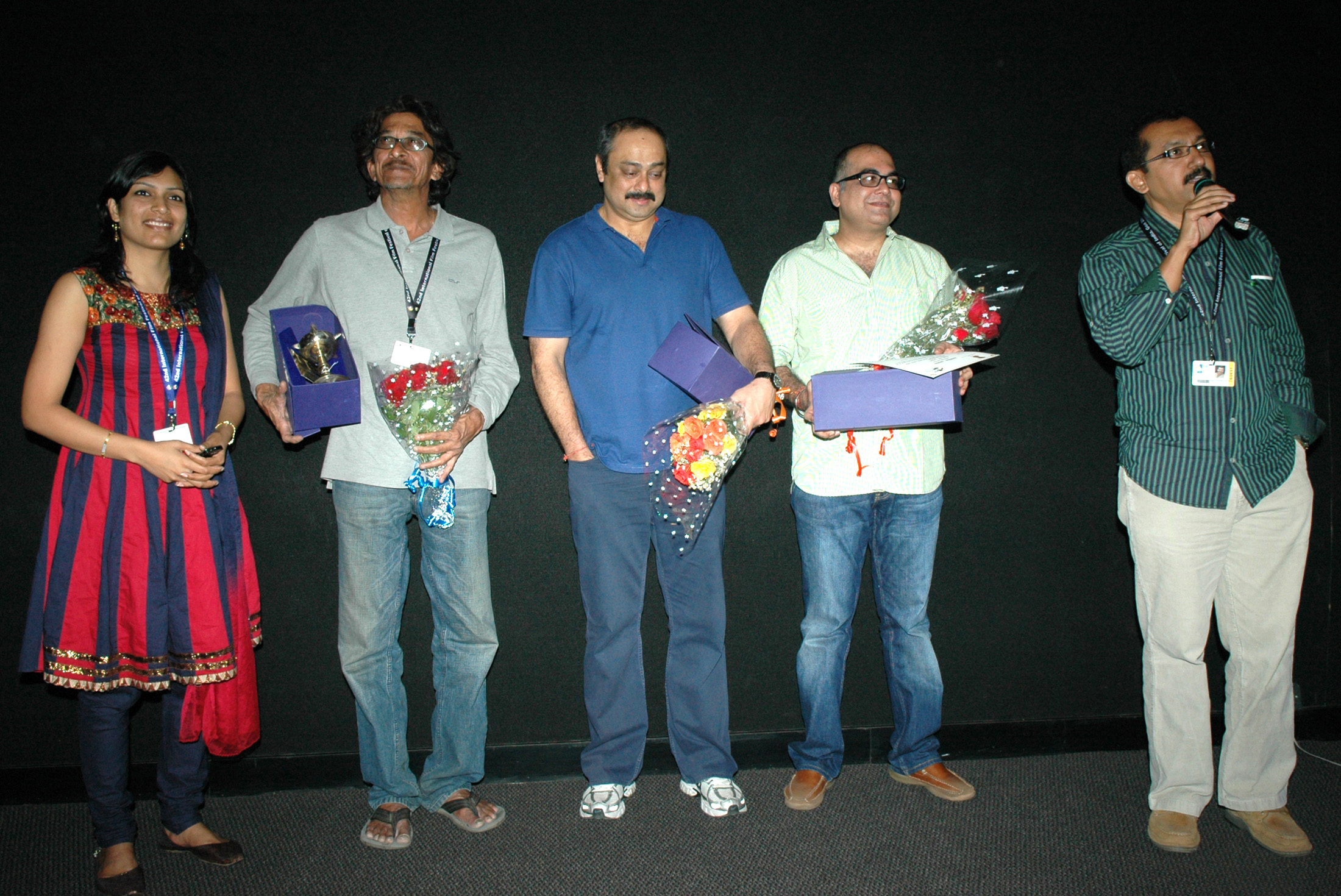
Film crew at IFFI (2011)

== Awards ==
Award	Category	Recipient
Zee Gaurav Puraskar	Best Actor	Sachin Khedekar
Mahrashtracha Favourate Kaun?	Best Actor	Sachin Khedekar
Pune International Film Festival	Best Film	Ekta Kapoor
Colors Screen Awards	Best Film	Ekta Kapoor
Colors Screen Awards	Best Director	Kiran Yadnyopavit
Colors Screen Awards	Best Actor	Sachin Khedekar
