= Kyaa Super Kool Hain Hum =

2012 Indian film by Sachin Yardi

- Theatrical release poster
- Directed by: Sachin Yardi
- Written by: Sachin Yardi
- Screenplay by: Sachin Yardi
- Story by: Sachin Yardi
- Produced by: Ekta Kapoor; Shobha Kapoor
- Starring: Tusshar Kapoor; Riteish Deshmukh; Neha Sharma; Sarah Jane Dias; Anupam Kher
- Cinematography: Anil Mehta
- Edited by: Aarif Sheikh
- Music by: Songs: Meet Bros Anjjan; Shankar–Ehsaan–Loy; Sachin–Jigar; Background Score: Sanjoy Chowdhury
- Production companies: Balaji Motion Pictures; ALT Entertainment
- Distributed by: Balaji Motion Pictures
- Release date: 27 July 2012
- Running time: 137 minutes
- Country: India
- Language: Hindi
- Budget: ₹19 crore
- Box office: ₹60.77 crore

Kyaa Super Kool Hain Hum (transl. How super cool we are) is a 2012 Indian Hindi-language adult comedy film written and directed by Sachin Yardi. Produced by Ekta Kapoor, it is the second in Kyaa Kool Hain Hum series and again stars Tusshar Kapoor and Riteish Deshmukh. The film was a surprise box office success like its predecessor, grossing ₹60.87 crore worldwide.

== Plot ==
The story revolves around Siddharth "Sid" and Aditya "Adi", who are roommates and good friends. Adi is a struggling actor, while Sid is a struggling DJ who admires his own dog Sakkru more than himself. Adi and Sid manage to meet ends by offering Sakkru for mating in dog breeding centres where Sakkru mates with female dogs of his breed on a specific music played by Sid. Adi falls in love with Simran Singhania, who works at a call center. Adi proposes Simran for marriage, but she refuses and lies to him of being a lesbian, while Sid falls for Anuradha “Anu” Marlo, whom he meets at a fashion show. Then Anu and Simran go to Goa to meet Anu's father, Francis Marlo, who has gone mad ever since the death of his mother. In Goa, Baba 3G, a conman posing as a priest tells Marlo that his dead mother, Rosemary Marlo, has been reincarnated into a female dog. When Adi and Sid, along with Sakkru, follow the girls to Goa, Sid meets Marlo, where Sakkru copulates with the female dog, Rosemary.

Marlo then believes that the dog is not his mother, as her mother was so pure. However, Baba 3G, who is skeptical to lose his business, tells Marlo that his father, Michael Marlo, has been reincarnated too as Sakkru, and then Sakkru is kidnapped by Marlo. Sid comes to rescue Sakkru, where Marlo offers Sid to host the New Year's Eve Party as the DJ and takes Sakkru. Adi mistakes Anu for being the partner of Simran and tells Sid about it. Both get heartbroken and decide to leave Goa with Sakkru. Later, Marlo decides to get Rosemary and Sakkru married. Adi receives a message from Simran that she has a confession to make and wishes to meet him. When Adi and Sid reach Marlo's mansion, they misunderstand the message passed by the security and assume that Simran and Anu are getting married forcefully by Marlo. They both reach the venue of marriage, where Simran tells Adi that she is not a lesbian and loves him, resulting in both reuniting. Sid, with intent to take Sakkru back, plays the music on which Sakkru runs on a mating spree in the function. A police inspector at the venue recognizes Baba 3G as a criminal and arrests him. The film ends with the marriage of Adi with Simran, Sid's with Anu, and Sakkru's with Rosemary.

== Cast ==
- Tusshar Kapoor as Aditya "Adi", Sid's Roommate; Simran's Love Interest
- Riteish Deshmukh as Siddharth "Sid" , Adi's Roommate; Anu's Love Interest
- Sarah-Jane Dias as Anuradha “Anu” Marlo, Sid's Love Interest; Simran's Best Friend; Francis's Daughter
- Neha Sharma as Simran Singhania, Adi's Love Interest; Anu's Best Friend
- Anupam Kher as Francis Marlo, Anu's Father
- Razak Khan as Popat, The laundrywaala
- Shireesh Sharma as Mr. Singhania, Simran's Father
- Chunky Pandey as Baba 3G
- Delnaaz Irani as Mrs. Dev Paul; Sid and Adi's Neighbour
- Howard Rosemeyer as Adam, Owner of Adam and Steve, The Gay Club; Anu's Friend
- Rohit Shetty as Himself (Cameo)
- Bikramjeet Kanwarpal as Church Father for the Marriage of Rosemary and Sakkru (Cameo)
- Nalneesh Neel as Dog Thief
- Kavin Dave as Trippy Grewal
- Yusuf Hussain as Catholic Priest

== Reception ==
=== Critical reception ===
Taran Adarsh of Bollywood Hungama gave the movie 3.5/5 stars, and finds the film one big joyride from commencement to conclusion. He says, "This one is for the masses, for youngsters, for those who loved part one and enjoyed its crazy hilarity." He concludes "KYAA SUPER KOOL HAIN HUM offers entertainment, entertainment and only entertainment in large doses!" Sonia Chopra of Sify gave the movie 3/5 stars, concluding that "Director Sachin Yardi tells the story in his usual, unapologetic style. One would call the film clumsy, had it not been funny. But humorous it is, even if in parts. Worth a watch, if you're not very high-brow or prudish when it comes to humour." Madhureeta Mukherjee of Times of India gave the movie 3/5 stars, stating that "If you were sex (comedy) starved after Kyaa Kool Hai Hum, this sequel force-feeds you a double dose. This one's for teens who get a 'boner' out of bad jokes, but it may get a rise out of some adults too. Watch at your own 'risque'."

Vinayak Chakravorthy of India Today gave the movie 2.5/5 stars, stating that "Director Sachin Yardi almost deliberately plays dumb with his narrative. His effort is a randy, satirical punch on almost every trick that defines Bollywood's 100-crore club. The film makes you snigger, and then you snigger at yourself for doing as much at something so obviously silly and raunchy. You realise there is reason behind the mindless mayhem that just unfolded before your eyes as the end credits roll. It's called box-office moolah, and this film is going to make lots of it." Kunal Guha of Yahoo! gave the movie 2/5 stars, commenting that "'Kyaa Super Kool Hain Hum' is surely a school of sickeningly dirty jokes that will shock, disgust and scandalize but ensure that you have a good time. So don't leave your brains (or any other organs) at home, you will need it to dig out the implied meaning in every line." Aniruddha Guha of DNA India gave the movie 2/5 stars, saying that "Kyaa Super Kool Hain Hum amuses you intermittently but largely leaves your brains in a tangle, and the mind gasping for breath. In other words, dimaag ki macho deta hai." Shomini Sen of Zee News gave the movie 2/5 stars, stating that "KSKHH is an assault to your brain to say the least. But we know you will watch it nevertheless. After all don't we go to the movies to get entertained and not take on more stress? Go on, watch it but do carry a bottle of painkillers with you. Might come in handy later."

Anupama Chopra of Hindustan Times gave 1.5/5 stars, commenting that "Writer-director Sachin Yardi is too lazy to create a plot, so the film is just a series of gags that allow him to bung in as many puerile sexual innuendos as possible. Kyaa Super Kool Hain Hum becomes a drag within the first twenty minutes and then continues for another two hours or so." Rajeev Masand of CNN-IBN gave it 1.5/5 stars, saying that "I'm going with one-and-a-half out of five for 'Kyaa Super Kool Hain Hum'. It's not that the humor's adult that is the issue here, it's that it doesn't make you laugh!" Mayank Shekhar of Daily Bhaskar gave the movie 1.5/5 stars, stating that "All the humour is in the lines. The dialogue writer of this film is a decent chutkula writer, suited best for stand-up comedies or hasya kavitas. You know at some point the jokes will dry up. They'll start exhausting you with their only meaning; let alone the double meaning. The film will lose energy too, given there wasn't much of a plot to keep it going for this long." Raja Sen of Rediff gave the movie 1.5/5 stars, stating that "Sachin Yardi's Kyaa Super Kool Hain Hum is, an A-rated film that feels the need to shy away from swearwords and put big, forbidding 'Adults' stickers onto even copulating canines. The film wants to be racy, but has television-friendliness forced onto its very being: which explains actors dropping their jaws at the (suggested) mention of genitalia and constantly hiding behind clumsy innuendo." Blessy Chettiar of DNA India gave the movie 1/5 stars, commenting that "Tawdry innuendos, racial slurs, repugnant gibes at the gay community and overall cheap humour define the 'kool' of KSKHH. Sorry boss, we define our own cool, and KSKHH figures nowhere close." Karan Anshuman of Mumbai Mirror gave 1/5 stars, saying that "There are sex comedies. Then there are bad sex comedies. Then there is just bad. And then finally – right at the bottom of this pile – there is KSKHH. It has innuendos so obvious, swearing so uninhibited, and gestures so lewd, that you can only imagine what must be going on in the writers' minds to distill this from their imaginations." Saibal Chatterjee of NDTV gave the movie 1/5 stars, concluding that "Kyaa Super Kool Hain Hum strives very hard indeed to be a worthy adult comedy, a poor Indian country cousin of American Pie, but all it manages to be is a juvenile and clunky ride through unending yards of the kind of laboured gags that went out of vogue with Dada Kondke. The film is ostensibly targeted at the teen segment and it might even find some takers there. But it barely passes muster as a sex comedy. It's crude, crass and completely clueless." Janhavi Samant of Mid-Day gave the movie 0.5/5 stars, stating that "The whole film is pretty much avoidable. Neither vulgar enough to denounce, nor gross enough to outrage, nor absurd enough to be funny, just plain indifferent and insipid."

== Soundtrack ==
Kyaa Super Kool Hain Hum

Soundtrack album by: Meet Bros; Shankar–Ehsaan–Loy; Sachin-Jigar
- Released: 29 June 2012
- Genre: Film soundtrack
- Label: T-Series
- Producer: Ekta Kapoor

Meet Bros; Shankar–Ehsaan–Loy; Sachin-Jigar; chronology
Kyaa Super Kool Hain Hum (2012)	Chittagong (2012)

Sachin–Jigar chronology
Tere Naal Love Ho Gaya (2012)	Kyaa Super Kool Hain Hum (2012)	ABCD: Any Body Can Dance (2013)

"Dil Garden Garden Ho Gaya" was composed by Sachin–Jigar and written by Mayur Puri, while the rest of all songs are by Meet Bros Anjjan. The song “Hum Toh Hain Cappucino” is the remake version of “Main Aai Hoon Up Bihar Lotne” by Sapna Awasthi with slightly different lyrics from the 1999 film Shool, composed by Shankar–Ehsaan–Loy and written by Sameer.

=== Track listings ===
No.	Title	Lyrics	Music	Singer(s)	Length
1.	"Dil Garden Garden Ho Gaya"	Mayur Puri	Sachin–Jigar	Vishal Dadlani	3:18
2.	"Shirt Da Button"	Kumaar	Meet Bros Anjjan	Sonu Nigam, Meet Bros Anjjan, Asad Abbas	6:48
3.	"Hum Toh Hain Cappucino"	Sameer, Kumaar	Shankar–Ehsaan–Loy, Meet Bros Anjjan	Daler Mehndi, Sukhwinder Singh, Riteish Deshmukh	5:30
4.	"Volume High Karle"	Kumaar	Meet Bros Anjjan	Neeraj Shridhar	5:30
5.	"Shirt Da Button" (Version 2)	Kumaar	Meet Bros Anjjan	Kailash Kher, Meet Bros Anjjan	6:38
6.	"Dil Garden Garden Ho Gaya" (Remix)	Mayur Puri	Sachin–Jigar	Vishal Dadlani	3:42
7.	"Volume High Karle" (Remix)	Kumaar	Meet Bros Anjjan	Neeraj Shridhar	3:42

== Box office ==
=== Domestic ===
Kyaa Super Kool Hain Hum opened very well at multiplexes with collections around the 60-70% mark. The single screen opening was a bit lower. Kyaa Super Kool Hain Hum had a good first day of around ₹65.0 million (US$690,000) nett. Kyaa Super Kool Hain Hum did very well over its first weekend. The film grossed around ₹215 million (US$2.3 million) over the weekend. The film has collected ₹345 million (US$3.7 million) in week one which is a very good total for a low-budget film. Kyaa Super Kool Hain Hum had a decent second weekend of around ₹55.0 million (US$590,000) nett. The film did fairly well in week two, grossing around ₹73.0 million (US$780,000) net and taking its two-week total to around ₹421 million (US$4.5 million) crore nett.

=== Overseas ===
Kyaa Super Kool Hain Hum had collected a gross of $550,000 from overseas markets.

== Controversies ==
A complaint was registered by an Indian citizen claiming the film offends religious sentiments. According to the FIR, the complainant said that Kyaa Super Kool Hain Hum uses the name Rosemary Maarlo, which translates from the Hindi, रोज़ मेरी मार लो to "screw me every day please", which was considered offensive slang against Christian names. The same name is given to a character played by Sharman Joshi in a girl hostel to con a girl student in Style (2001 film).

The film was banned in Muscat, Kuwait and Pakistan due to its sexual comedy.

== Sequel ==
A sequel named Kyaa Kool Hain Hum 3 was released on 22 January 2016.
