= Priya Raina =

Indian actress

- Born: 5 November 1988 (age 37); Kashmir, India
- Occupations: Radio jockey, actress, singer, comedian, host, voice-over artist
- Years active: 2009–present

Priya Raina (born 5 November 1988) is an Indian television actress, singer, comedian, host, and voice over artist born in Kashmir, India. She is best known for her comedy show Comedy Circus Ka Naya Daur on Sony TV. In 2019 she released her first Kashmiri music video "Madno" winning her accolades. In 2020 she won an award in India Voice Fest for the best female voice in Hindi Drama category. She was recently seen in popular web series Rocket Boys on Sony Liv.

== Personal life ==
Priya Raina was born on 5 November 1988 in Kashmir, India to Shuban Lal Raina and Rekha Raina, belonging to the generations of Kashmiri Pandits who experienced the Kashmiri Pandit genocide in her childhood. She holds a master's degree in English Literature and is a trained singer.

She started her career as a radio jockey with Big FM and later participated in the reality show India's Got Talent on Colors followed by Comedy Circus on Sony TV. She has also acted in various TV shows, films and commercials. She is a well-known voice artist.

== Filmography ==
=== Films ===
| Year | Title | Role | Language |
|---|---|---|---|
| 2020 | Shimla Mirchi | Sonu | Hindi |

=== Web series ===
| Year | Title | Role | Language |
|---|---|---|---|
| 2022 | Rocket Boys | Pratima Puri | Hindi |

=== Television ===
| Year | Title | Role |
|---|---|---|
| 2009 | India's Got Talent | Contestant |
| 2011 | Comedy Circus Ka Naya Daur | Contestant |
| 2012 | Movers & Shakers | Various characters |
| 2014 | Fakebook with Kavita | Various characters |
| 2014 | Comedy Classes | Various characters |
| 2014 | Maharakshak: Aryan | Jal Mann / Goddess |
| 2015 | Reporters | Author Nalini |
| 2015 | Iss Pyaar Ko Kya Naam Doon? Ek Baar Phir | Dr. Surbhi |
| 2016 | Mazaak Mazaak Mein | Various characters |
| 2017 | Har Mard Ka Dard | Professor Rastogi |
| 2017–2018 | Sajan Re Phir Jhooth Mat Bolo | Kangana Kalia (KK), Fake Daimaa |
| 2018 | Kya Haal, Mr. Paanchal? | Mohini |
| 2018 | Super Sisters - Chalega Pyar Ka Jaadu | Dr. Tanushree |

== Dubbing roles ==
=== Foreign language films ===
| Film title | Actress | Character | Dub Language | Original Language | Original Year release | Dub Year release | Notes |
|---|---|---|---|---|---|---|---|
| Star Wars: The Force Awakens | Daisy Ridley | Rey | Hindi | English | 2015 | | |
| Star Wars: The Last Jedi | Daisy Ridley | Rey | Hindi | English | 2017 | | |
| Star Wars: The Rise of Skywalker | Daisy Ridley | Rey | Hindi | English | 2019 | | |

=== Indian films ===
| Film title | Actress | Character | Dub Language | Original Language | Original Year release | Dub Year release | Notes |
|---|---|---|---|---|---|---|---|
| Welcome 2 Karachi | Lauren Gottlieb | ISI Agent Shazia Ansari | Hindi | Hindi | 2015 | | Due to the actress' poor knowledge of Hindi, Priya's voice replaced theirs, even though the films had already been shot in Hindi. |
| Kyaa Kool Hain Hum 3 | Mandana Karimi | Shaalu Karjatiya | Hindi | Hindi | 2016 | | Due to the actress' poor knowledge of Hindi, Priya's voice replaced theirs, even though the films had already been shot in Hindi. |
| Hate Story 4 | Rita Siddiqui | Monica | Hindi | Hindi | 2018 | | |
| Aravinda Sametha Veera Raghava | Pooja Hegde | Aravindha | Hindi | Telugu | 2018 | 2020 | Performed alongside Sanket Mhatre who voiced Jr. NTR as Veera Raghava Reddy in Hindi. |
| Saakshyam | Pooja Hegde | Soundarya Lahari | Hindi | Telugu | 2018 | 2020 | |
| Jagame Thandhiram | Aishwarya Lekshmi | Attila | Hindi | Tamil | 2021 | | Performed alongside Sachin Gole who voiced Dhanush as Suruli in Hindi. |
