= 10:10 (film) =

2008 Indian Bengali film

- Theatrical Release Poster
- Directed by: Arin Paul
- Written by: Arin Paul; Padmanabha Dasgupta
- Produced by: Morpheus Media Ventures
- Starring: Soumitra Chatterjee; Kanchan Mullick; Claudia Ciesla; Subrat Dutta; Aparajita Ghosh Das; Abir Chatterjee
- Cinematography: Basab Mallick
- Edited by: Aravinda Dasgupta
- Music by: Drono Acharya
- Distributed by: Morpheus Media Ventures
- Release date: 28 November 2008
- Running time: 95 minutes
- Country: India
- Language: Bengali

10:10 is a 2008 Indian Bengali comedy film directed by Arin Paul. It features Soumitra Chatterjee, Kanchan Mullick, Claudia Ciesla, Subrata Dutta, Aparajita Ghosh Das and Abir Chatterjee.

== Production ==
The movie was released on November 28, 2008. 10:10 is a comedy set in Calcutta and marks the debut of its director, Arin Paul, as well as its lead actors, Chirasree Singha Roy and Ahmed. The film also features the debut of cinematographer Basab Mullik, music director Drono Acharya, editor Aravinda Dasgupta, and several others.

== Plot ==
Durgaprasad an aged don wants to be a more successful don and would like to be in the league of Dawood Ibrahim who he considers to be his idol. To keep him company at all times he has two sidekicks in the form of Montu Singh and Jhantu Singh and Montu of the very shrill voice and loves to play with toy guns. Durgarasad's daughter Ranjita is in love with Aparatim a struggling actor. Ranjita has a couple of friends who are journalists and wants to do a story about the underworld and the underworld dons of the city. One of the friends asks Ranjita to help her write a story on Durgaprasad as he lives in Ranjita's lane. Meanwhile, Durgaprasad's outgoing calls are barred and he sends Montu with 50,000 rupees, the outstanding amount to the shop to clear his bills so that he can again start receiving calls. Montu pays the amount, but misplaces Durgaprasad's number by a single digit and so the entire number is credited to the amount account of Apratim. Durgaprasad is furious that his phone is still not working and likes Montu and goes to the shop to find out exactly what happened. He learns that his number is misplaced and the amount has been credited to Apratim though he is unaware of his real identity. His men threaten Apratim and tells him to repay the money or otherwise they will finish him. Ranjita tells her friends about her father's real identity. Her friends decide to take the help of the rival don Muktadhara to face Durgaprasad. Durgaprasad decides to finish off Apratim the next day, but he has an unpleasant dream at night and he wakes up the next day at 10:10, the time at which he was supposed to bump off Apratim and turns a new leaf.

== Cast ==
- Soumitra Chatterjee as Durgaprasad
- Subrat Dutta as Aparatim
- Aparajita Ghosh Das as Ranjita
- Claudia Ciesla as Serin
- Kanchan Mullick as Montu
- Abir Chatterjee as Abhishek
- Parambrata Chatterjee - Guest appearance

== Soundtrack ==
10:10

Soundtrack album by Drono Acharya
- Released: 12 November 2008 (India)
- Recorded: 2008
- Genre: Film soundtrack
- Label: Morpheus Music

Drono Acharya composed the film's songs and Ritam Sen, Sandip Chakrabarty, Padmanabha Dasgupta, Rana Basu Thakur and Rangeet wrote the lyrics.

Track #	Song	Singer(s)	Duration
1	"Boye Jaabo"	Sidhu	4:34
2	"Hey Yaaron (Hindi)"	Sunidhi Chauhan, Sidhu	3:16
3	"Bulbula"	Jojo, Sidhu	3:44
4	"10:10 Title Track (English)"	Claudia Ciesla	2:57
5	"Bonolota"	Nachiketa Chakraborty, Kajol	2:18
6	"Kolkata"	Babul Supriyo, Sree	5:37
7	"10:10 Theme (English)"	Claudia Ciesla (Remix by Arya & Amit Das)	2:38
8	"Boye Jaabo"	Instrumental (Remix by Arya & Amit Das)	4:34
9	"Kolkata"	Instrumental (Remix by Remix by Arya & Amit Das)	5:37
