= Kucch To Hai =

2003 Indian film by Anurag Basu and Anil V. Kumar

- Theatrical release poster
- Directed by: Anurag Basu; Anil V. Kumar
- Screenplay by: Rajeev Jhaveri
- Dialogues by: Umesh Shukla; Anuraag Parparna
- Story by: Rajeev Jhaveri
- Produced by: Ekta Kapoor; Shobha Kapoor
- Starring: Tusshar Kapoor; Esha Deol; Anita Hassanandani; Yash Tonk; Rishi Kapoor; Jeetendra
- Cinematography: Johny Lal; Fowzia Fathima
- Edited by: Anurag Basu
- Music by: Anu Malik
- Production company: Balaji Motion Pictures
- Release date: 24 January 2003
- Running time: 136 mins
- Country: India
- Language: Hindi
- Budget: ₹7 crore
- Box office: ₹11 crore

Kucch To Hai (transl. Something is there) is a 2003 Indian Hindi-language slasher film written by Rajeev Jhaveri and co-directed by Anurag Basu (credited as Anurag Bose) and Anil V. Kumar. The film stars Tusshar Kapoor, Esha Deol, Anita Hassanandani, Yash Tonk, Rishi Kapoor, Jeetendra and Moonmoon Sen. Produced by Ekta Kapoor and Shobha Kapoor under the banner Balaji Motion Pictures, it is an unofficial adaptation of the 1997 American film I Know What You Did Last Summer which itself was an adaptation of Lois Duncan's 1973 novel of the same name. It was released on 24 January 2003 and was a commercial failure at the box office.

== Plot ==
Karan (Tusshar Kapoor) and Natasha (Anita Hassanandani) are childhood friends. Natasha has always loved Karan, albeit secretly, and wanted to marry him. Karan, however, falls for Tanya (Esha Deol), the new student at the college. Meanwhile, Professor Bakshi (Rishi Kapoor), who is rumoured to have murdered his wife and hidden her body, is reinstated at the college. A playboy named Yash (Yash Tonk) befriends Karan and helps his way through Tanya's heart. To impress Tanya, Karan promises her that he will steal the exam answers from Professor Bakshi's house so that Tanya will pass easily.

Together, Karan, Natasha, and Yash, along with two other friends, Pat and Kush, sneak inside Professor Bakshi's house to retrieve the exam papers for Tanya. When they find a woman's dead body there, they try to run away but are chased by Professor Bakshi. Their car accidentally hits Professor Bakshi, and he falls down the cliff. Fearing arrest, they run away. Tanya is traumatized by these events and leaves to start a new life.

Years later, Tanya, Karan, and their group have a reunion at the wedding of one of their friends. However, a killer, in a black hood carrying a curved knife, is lurking somewhere nearby and is waiting to strike. One by one they start to die: Dolly, Pat, and Kush are all killed, while Yash is attacked but miraculously survives. Eventually, only three are left.

When Yash is attacked again, Karan follows, who appears to be Professor Bakshi, only to find someone else being attacked while Bakshi is with him. He leaves to find Khush attacked, and Khush says "Tanya" as he holds a piece of red fabric.

Karan follows a car that has Natasha and Tanya in it to a cliff and finds Natasha injured. She tells him that Professor Bakshi has brought her and Tanya here. Karan realises she is lying, as Professor Bakshi was with him, and also realises the piece of fabric Khush had in his hand came off Natasha's scarf. He asks Natasha why she attacked everyone, and she claims it is because she loves him. She begs him to forgive her, but he is speechless. She says that after finding this out, he won't forgive her, so she walks backward in the snow and falls off the edge, yelling Karan's name. He runs to save her but is unsuccessful, and her scarf blows into his face.

On the first day of college, Karan remembers each of his friends who died, including Natasha. While on the plane back to Delhi, he meets Tanya again, and they decide to be with each other while they find Yash in the back seat.

== Cast ==
- Tusshar Kapoor as Karan
- Esha Deol as Tanya Oberoi
- Rishi Kapoor as Professor Bakshi
- Johnny Lever as Popatlal
- Anita Hassanandani as Natasha aka Tashu
- Vrajesh Hirjee as Pat
- Yash Tonk as Yash
- Manoj Pahwa as Professor Bhalla; Dolly's father
- Moon Moon Sen as Madam Saxena
- Jeetendra as Ravi, Karan's father
- Kusumit Sana as Dolly
- Akshay as Kush

== Production ==
A substantial part of the film was directed by Anurag Basu, before Ekta Kapoor replaced him with Anil V. Kumar due to creative differences. Post Basu's departure, Kapoor and Kumar made multiple changes to the film, which included retaining only 25 percent of Basu's work and changing the title which was previously Kya Pyar Karoge Mujhse (transl. Will You Love Me).

Anil V. Kumar, the director of the film, stated that while some portions were taken from the American film I Know What You Did Last Summer (1997), it was not a remake. Actors Tusshar Kapoor and Esha Deol, said that while in the same genre, their film was not a remake and had been made with Indian sensibilities, being a fast-paced, racy thriller as opposed to the 1997 film.

== Music ==
The film's soundtrack contains 8 songs, all composed by Anu Malik and written by Sameer. According to the Indian trade website Box Office India, with around 9,00,000 units sold, this film's soundtrack album was the year's fourteenth highest-selling.

No.	Title	Singer(s)	Length
1.	"Aisa Kyun Hota Hai I"	Sunidhi Chauhan, K.K.	4:58
2.	"Aisa Kyun Hota Hai II"	Sunidhi Chauhan, KK	2:01
3.	"Ding Dong"	Sunidhi Chauhan, KK	4:52
4.	"Hai Rey"	Babul Supriyo, Sadhana Sargam	5:03
5.	"Pyaar Pyaar Mein"	Sonu Nigam	5:45
6.	"Hone Laga"	Sunidhi Chauhan, Priya Bhattacharya	6:03
7.	"Kya Pyaar Karoge Mujhse"	Sadhana Sargam, Alka Yagnik, Sonu Nigam	5:33
8.	"Yeh Mera Dil"	Sunidhi Chauhan, Shaan	4:45

== Reception ==
Taran Adarsh from Bollywood Hungama gave the film one star out of five and labeled it "a poor copy of I Know What You Did Last Summer" while criticizing the screenplay and the climax, and singling out the soundtrack for praise.

Conversely, Paul Lê from Bloody Disgusting found it mostly entertaining and immersive, and felt that while the horror aspect was sporadic, the select pinching from the I Know franchise and Urban Legend was really only a fraction of an otherwise original production and a stylish spectacle.

== See also ==
- List of Bollywood thriller films
- I Know What You Did Last Summer (franchise)
- Dhund - The Fog, another 2003 Indian Hindi-language film inspired by I Know What You Did Last Summer.
