= Teri Bhabhi Hai Pagle =

- Theatrical release poster
- Directed by: Vinod Tiwari
- Produced by: Raj Nostrum; Haresh Kumar Nor; Vinod Tiwari
- Starring: Krushna Abhishek; Rajneesh Duggal; Deepshikha Nagpal; Mukul Dev; Sunil Pal; Nazia Hussain
- Cinematography: Navneet Beohar
- Edited by: Sanjay Sankla
- Music by: Anamik Chauhan; Vijay Verma
- Production company: Nostrum Entertainment
- Distributed by: Zee Music Company
- Release date: 13 July 2018
- Country: India
- Language: Hindi

Teri Bhabhi Hai Pagle (transl. She is your sister-in-law, silly) is a 2018 Indian Hindi-language action comedy film directed and co-produced by Vinod Tiwari. Jointly produced by Raj Nostrum, Haresh Kumar Nor and Tiwari, the film stars Krushna Abhishek, Rajneesh Duggal, Deepshikha Nagpal, Mukul Dev, Sunil Pal and Nazia Hussain. The film was released theatrically on 13 July 2018. The film was earlier titled Love in Goa, but was later changed after Abhishek's suggestion to the director, who was inspired by the title of the television serial Woh Teri Bhabhi Hai Pagle.

== Plot ==
Dev (Rajniesh) is an assistant director working in television serials and aspires to direct a film. He approaches Raj Chopra (Krushna Abhishek), a superstar actor with his story. Raj Chopra listens to the story and agrees to produce the film. Dev's friend, Ragni ( Nazia Hussain), accidentally auditions for the role and Raj finalizes her to be the lead actress. Finally, the shooting starts in Goa. While Dev is trying to make the movie, Raj is more concerned about wooing Ragni and takes her to casinos and parties occasionally. The twist in the story comes in the middle of the movie shoot. While the team is shooting a scene where Raj saves Ragni from thugs, Goa Police arrives at the location and arrests the whole crew and puts them behind bars. When Ragni asks Dev what will happen next, Raj replies that only Arvind Hudda aka Arru Bhai (Mukul Dev) can save them. Arru is a powerful mobster in Mumbai and is the one who is financing this movie on Raj's request. Raj calls Arru and asks him to come to Goa. Arru Bhai lies to his wife Sulochana (Deepshikha Nagpal ) that he's going to Hyderabad for an urgent meeting. He then goes to Goa and gets the whole crew out of the police station. When the shoot resumes, Arru Bhai starts liking Ragni and falls in love with her...all this while Raj is already in love with her. Ragni is stuck between the three men. The story gets another twist when Arru Bhai's wife finds out that he had lied about his trip to go to Goa. She goes to Goa and the story continues.

== Cast ==
- Rajneesh Duggal as Dev D
- Krushna Abhishek as Raj Chopra
- Nazia Hussain as Ragini
- Mukul Dev as Arvind Hudda aka Arru Bhai
- Deepshikha Nagpal as Sulochana Arvind Hudda, Arru's wife
- Sunil Pal as Nawaab
- Nancy Marwah as Salma
- Khayali Saharan as Sunder
- Aman Verma as Guddu Rangeela
- Vineet Sharma as Inspector
- Anil Nagrath as himself
- Claudia Ciesla as an item number

== Production ==
Director Vinod Tiwari said that he was inspired by the current situation of the Industry and decided to make a film on it: "I was working on a project in past when I saw the some people approaching actress again and again for coffee or a drink when clearly she wasn't interested but people didn't give up. So I thought of making a satire on the topic."

== Soundtrack ==
The Music Was Composed By Aanamik Chauhan, Vijay Verma and Released by Zee Music Company.

Teri Bhabhi Hai Pagle

Soundtrack album by Aanamik Chauhan Vijay Verma
- Released: 20 June 2018
- Recorded: 2018
- Genre: Soundtrack
- Length: 16:14
- Label: Zee Music Company
- Producer: Aanamik Chauhan; Vijay Verma

Track list
No.	Title	Lyrics	Singer(s)	Length
1.	"Confused Lover"	Atiya Sayyed	Mika Singh, Aaniya	3:56
2.	"Tequila Shot"	Rajesh Manthan	Nakash Aziz, Geet Sagar, Amrita Talukder	4:27
3.	"Tattoo Song"	Hari Shankar Sufi	Sunidhi Chauhan, Geet Sagar	3:19
4.	"Rab Mere Ya"	Rajesh Manthan	Keshav Kumar, Tanushree Roy Chowdhury	4:32
Total length:				16:14

== Critical reception ==
Reza Noorani of The Times of India gave a negative review and wrote: "With an absent script, poorly written dialogues and several attempts at low brow comedy, there is hardly anything worth looking forward to." Kunal Guha of Mumbai Mirror called it "an unbearable comedy" and wrote: "There are unbearable films and there are those which seem to be ghost produced by a certain pharma company to boost the sales of their migraine pills. This one, unsurprisingly, falls in the latter." A review carried by Indo-Asian News Service said, "Overall, the irony of Teri Bhabhi Hai Pagle is that it fails as a satire on a film that fails, by failing itself."
