= Claudia Ciesla =

Polish-born German actress and model

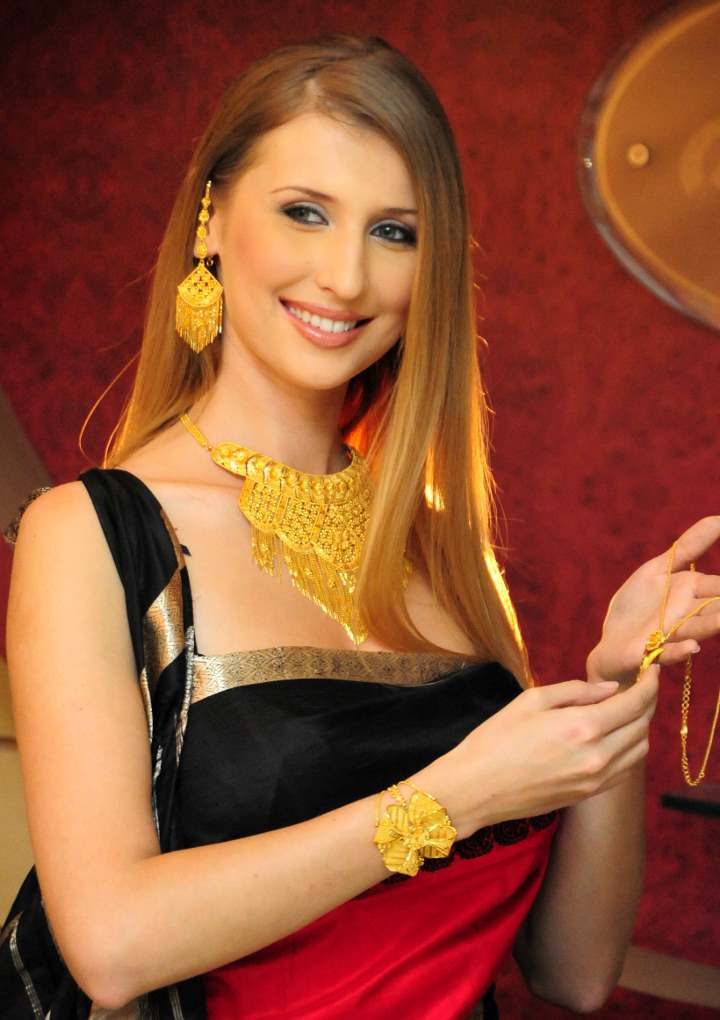
- Ciesla in 2008
- Born: 1986 or 1987 (age 39–40); Wodzisław Śląski, Katowice Voivodeship, Polish People's Republic
- Citizenship: Poland; Germany
- Occupations: Actress; model; nutritionist
- Website: cclaudia.net claudiasconcept.com

Claudia Ciesla (Polish: Klaudia Cieśla) is a Polish-born German actress and model who works mainly in the Indian film industry. She was a contestant on the Indian reality television series Bigg Boss. Ciesla is also a nutritionist in India and author of Keep Eating Keep Losing.

== Early life ==
Ciesla was born in Wodzisław Śląski, Katowice Voivodeship, Polish People's Republic (now Silesian Voivodeship, Republic of Poland). Her father is a clinical psychologist and is of Polish descent and her mother is an architect and is of German descent.

== Career ==
=== Modelling and acting career ===
Ciesla started modeling at the age of 15, working for shows involved in fashion and dancing.

In March 2006, Ciesla won a subscribers' poll on the websites of Auto Bild, Bild, Sat.1, T-Online and Kabeleins, naming her as Germany's Super Girl 2006. In November 2007, she said in an interview that she plans to become a tax consultant after her modelling career was finished.

In the tourist season of 2007–2008, Ciesla represented the tourist ski-village Damüls, the "snowiest village in the world", as the Snow Queen 2008 and appeared at various events, promotionals and photo shoots for magazines, adverts and brochures, including a cover shoot for the magazine "MOTOR-Freizeit and TRENDS" in Austria.

In 2007 and 2008, she appeared on the German Internet soap opera Beach House, playing Daisy Vandenburg. In 2008, The New Indian Express reported that Ciesla would be acting in a Bollywood film Karma, as part of an international film crew including leads Carlucci Weyant and Alma Saraci, that would be filmed in India. Film Director M.S. Shahjahan mentioned in an interview that there would be more assignments for Ciesla in Bollywood.

In July 2008, Ciesla played "Claudia" in the Italian television sitcom Outsiders in Palermo, shot in Palermo.

She also played the role of a German journalist in the film 10:10, directed by Arin Paul, together with Soumitra Chatterjee.

Ciesla was the Brand Ambassador of the "Lovely Professional University". LPU also honoured her as a "New promising foreign face in India". She also visited Thapar University for promotion of her Punjabi film, during their technical fest Aranya. On 26 November 2009, Ciesla was awarded the prestigious Karmaveer Puraskaar, which is iCONGO's National People's Award for Social Justice and Action, honouring concerned citizens who have led change. Past recipients of the Karmaveer Puraskar include Kajol, Alyque Padamsee, Rahul Bose, Remo Fernandes and M S Swaminathan.

=== Bigg Boss and Bollywood entry ===
Ciesla participated in the reality show Bigg Boss 3. It began airing on 4 October 2009 on Colors with Amitabh Bachchan as the host. This was her appearance on Indian reality TV. She was evicted on day 68, after spending 10 weeks on the show.

In December 2010, Ciesla attended the TV show Zor Ka Jhatka: Total Wipeout, shot in Buenos Aires, Argentina. It is the Indian celebrity version of Wipeout, with Bollywood actor Shah Rukh Khan as the host. The show ended on 25 February 2011 with Kushal Punjabi as the winner, while Ciesla was the runner-up by 51 seconds.

Ciesla made her first mainstream appearance in 2012, when she appeared on the item song "Balma", sharing screen space with Akshay Kumar in his film Khiladi 786. The song was composed by Himesh Reshammiya and the dance was choreographed by Ganesh Acharya.

In 2016, she appeared in the third part of the successful Bollywood franchiseKyaa Kool Hain Hum, titled Kyaa Kool Hain Hum 3. She was last seen dancing in a peppy number alongside Krushna Abhishek in the film Teri Bhabhi Hai Pagle.

=== Nutritionist and lifestyle coach ===
Ciesla is also a nutritionist and lifestyle coach who operates the website "Claudia's Concept". In 2019 she released Keep Eating Keep Losing (2019, Om Books International; ISBN 9789385273933), in which she presented her philosophy that enjoying food and maintaining a healthy lifestyle can go hand in hand. Claudia Ciesla's second book, Beyond Weight Loss: Eating, Healing & Ageing with Claudia's Concept, was published on 25 November 2026 by Om Books International ISBN 9789363955936). The book explores a holistic approach to health, focusing on nutrition, movement, sleep, recovery and overall well-being.

==== Achievements as a nutritionist ====
Ciesla was one of the panellists at the "Festival of Wellbeing" at St Regis Hotel Mumbai in May 2024. She spoke about current nutrition challenges such as obesity and protein deficiency in India.

She has appeared on a nutrition talk show called Weight & Watch by Claudia, which was released on Tata Play Fitness, D2H and Dish TV in August 2023. In this 4-episode series, she spoke about the relationship with food, mindfulness, gut health and digestive system, intermittent fasting, circadian rhythm, and the importance of all of the above to thrive in life.

== Filmography ==
=== Film ===
Year	Film	Role	Language	Country
2007	Beach House	Daisy Vandenburg	German	Germany
2008	Karma	Linda	English	United Kingdom
2008	Outsiders in Palermo	Claudia	Italian	Italy
2008	10:10	Serin	Bengali	India
2010	Private Number	-	Kannada	India
2012	Yaar Pardesi	Anna	Punjabi	India
2012	Khiladi 786	Special appearance in song "Balma"	Hindi	India
2013	@ Andheri		Malayalam	India
2014	Desi Kattey	Special appearance in item song "Patne Wali Hoon"	Hindi	India
2016	Kyaa Kool Hain Hum 3	Shakuntala (Sakku)	Hindi	India
2018	Teri Bhabhi Hai Pagle	Special appearance in item song "Confused Lover"	Hindi	India

=== Television ===
Year	Name	Role	Channel	Note	Ref
2009	Bigg Boss 3	Contestant (Evicted on Day 70 (semifinalist)	Colors TV		
2011	Zor Ka Jhatka: Total Wipeout	Contestant (Runner-up)	Imagine TV		
2016	Box Cricket League 2	Player	Colors TV	Jaipur Raj Joshiley	
