= Yaar Pardesi =

- Directed by: Gurbir Singh Grewal
- Story by: Gurbir Singh Grewal
- Produced by: Gurbir Singh Grewal; Sarabjeet Singh Bal; Inderjeet Singh Mann
- Starring: RJ Dhanveer; Raghveer Boli; Claudia Ciesla; Gurpreet Ghuggi
- Music by: Surinder Bachan; Gurpreet Pandher
- Production company: AVI Films Enterprises
- Release date: 24 August 2012
- Country: India
- Language: Punjabi

Yaar Pardesi is a 2012 Punjabi comedy drama film directed by Gurbir Singh Grewal. The movie was released on 24 August 2012. Gurpreet Ghuggi plays the lead role.

== Plot ==
Anna (Claudia Ciesla) comes to Punjab to find her sister's husband who cheated her and disappeared from Canada, with all her sister's valuables along with Sehaj (Vandana Singh). Sehaj's father wants to marry her to anyone who offers lot of money as Sehaj has permanent resident rights in Canada. Sehaj finds this and runs away from home and goes to Kuku's home (Gurpreet Ghuggi), whom they earlier met at Delhi Airport. After finding out that Sehaj has permanent residency of Canada, two of Kuku's friend Deep and Jashan tries to woo Sehaj. Sehaj is confused between the two and finally choose Jashan. A local businessman is interested in buying Kuku's family land. But Kuku is not interested so the businessman often sends hence henchman to threaten him. Kuku's sister is school teacher and on a day is invited for lunch at fellow teacher's home. She takes Anna along with her, where she finds the photograph of the man she is looking for. That man turns out to be husband of Kuku's sister's colleague Tarseem Singh (Binnu Dhillon). Kuku enlist Deep's school time friend Vijay, a suspended cop. Vijay kidnaps Ujagar Singh, the in-charge cop of the area, who is also accomplice in businessman and Tarseem's crimes. Vijay threatens Ujagar with life and gets the truth out of him. Due to solving this case, Vijay gets his job back and arrest Tarseem and the businessman. Kuku, Anna, Sehaj and Jashan forms a committed relationship.

== Cast ==
- Gurpreet Ghuggi
- RJ Dhanveer
- Vandana Singh
- Claudia Ciesla
- Navdeep Kalerrg
- BN Sharma
- Raghveer Boli
- Tarsinder Singh
- Anita meet
- Binnu Dhillon
