= Shobha Kapoor =

Indian producer (Born: 1949)

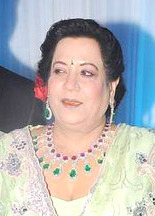
- Kapoor at Esha Deol's wedding reception in 2012
- Born: 1 February 1949 (age 77)
- Occupation: Television producer
- Spouse: Jeetendra (m. 1974)
- Children: Ekta Kapoor (daughter); Tusshar Kapoor (son)

Shobha Kapoor (born 1 February 1949) is an Indian television, film and web series producer. She is the managing director of Mumbai-based Balaji Telefilms Limited, a film, TV and web series production house, which she runs together with her daughter Ekta Kapoor.

Kapoor takes care of the overall administrative and production activities of Balaji Telefilms.

== Personal life ==
Before marriage, she was an airhostess. Kapoor is married to actor Jeetendra. The couple has two children, Ekta Kapoor (b. 1975), who is a producer, and Tusshar Kapoor (b. 1976), who is an actor.

== Filmography (as producer) ==
Key
†	Denotes films that have not yet been released

=== Films ===
The following is the long list of motion pictures produced by Kapoor under her banner Balaji Motion Pictures.

Year	Title
2001	Kyo Kii... Main Jhuth Nahin Bolta
2003	Kucch To Hai
2004	Krishna Cottage
2005	Kyaa Kool Hai Hum
2005	Koi Aap Sa
2007	Shootout at Lokhandwala
2008	Mission Istanbul
2008	C Kkompany
2008	EMI – Liya Hai Toh Chukana Parega
2010	Love Sex aur Dhokha
2010	Once Upon a Time in Mumbaai
2011	Taryanche Bait
2011	Shor in the City
2011	Ragini MMS
2011	The Dirty Picture
2012	Kyaa Super Kool Hai Hum
2013	Ek Thi Daayan
2013	Shootout at Wadala
2013	Lootera
2013	Once Upon a Time In Mumbaai Dobara
2014	Shaadi Ke Side Effects
2014	Ragini MMS 2
2014	Main Tera Hero
2014	Kuku Mathur Ki Jhand Ho Gayi
2014	Ek Villain — There's one in every love story
2016	Kyaa Kool Hain Hum 3
2016	Azhar
2016	Udta Punjab
2016	Great Grand Masti
2016	A Flying Jatt
2017	Half Girlfriend
2017	Super Singh
2018	Veere Di Wedding
2018	Laila Majnu
2019	Judgementall Hai Kya
2019	Jabariya Jodi
2019	Dream Girl
2019	Dolly Kitty Aur Woh Chamakte Sitare
2021	Pagglait
2022	Ek Villain Returns
2022	Goodbye
2022	Freddy
2023	U-Turn
2023	Kathal
2023	Dream Girl 2
2023	Jaane Jaan
2024	Vicky Vidya Ka Woh Wala Video
2024	The Sabarmati Report
2025	Mastiii 4
2025	Vrusshabha
2026	Bhooth Bangla

=== Web series ===
Year	Title	Platform	Ref.
2020	Who's Your Daddy	Alt Balaji	
