= Traffic Signal (film) =

- Theatrical release poster
- Directed by: Madhur Bhandarkar
- Written by: Sachin Yardi; Madhur Bhandarkar
- Produced by: Shailendra Singh; Madhur Bhandarkar
- Starring: Kunal Khemu; Neetu Chandra; Konkona Sen Sharma; Ranvir Shorey
- Cinematography: Mahesh Limaye
- Edited by: Devendra Murdeshwar
- Music by: Shamir Tandon
- Production companies: Madhur Bhandarkar Motion Pictures; Percept Picture Company
- Distributed by: Percept Picture Company
- Release date: 2 February 2007
- Country: India
- Language: Hindi
- Budget: ₹40 million (US$420,000)
- Box office: ₹85 million (US$880,000)

Traffic Signal is a 2007 Indian Hindi-language drama film co-written, co-produced and directed by Madhur Bhandarkar. The film stars Kunal Khemu, Neetu Chandra, Ranvir Shorey and Konkona Sen Sharma in the lead roles. It was released on 2 February 2007. Bhandarkar won the National Film Award for Best Direction.

== Plot ==
This film is about the lives and travails of people living around a fictitious traffic signal in Mumbai. Anybody who drives in Mumbai has experienced the 2-odd minute wait at a traffic signal.

The traffic signal includes a group of people who derive their daily livelihoods from it. There are beggars (both kids and adults), prostitutes, tricksters, eunuchs, and others who sell clothes, flowers, and trinkets. They speak quickly, act fast, and operate to make a meager living out of the harsh Mumbai street life. They owe allegiance and hafta (weekly "protection" fee) to the signal manager, Silsila.

Silsila grew up at the signal. He ran various trades there before he became the manager. He is an ideal manager: sensitive and caring of his workers yet ruthless when it comes to delivery. Silsila reports into a mid-level don, Jaffar, who in turn reports to the big boss, Haji Bhaijaan.

Life is well at the signal. A gentle girl, Rani, arrives at the signal to sell ethnic clothes. The initial fireworks blossom into deeper companionship with Silsila. Everything proceeds normally.

Unbeknownst to Silsila, Haji Bhaijaan is part of a larger nexus of evil that comprises politicians and the larger Mafia. Haji must play a dangerous game where he is forced to invoke the unwitting pawn, Silsila, to start a series of events that could ultimately destroy the traffic signal. Silsila is unaware of the larger consequences as he carries out his orders without question. But reality dawns on him when he is apprehended in a case of murder, extortion, and bribery where he was hardly aware of things.

The signal faces destruction. Silsila's world, and all the people who grew up with it, face extinction. Silsila is forced to choose between his life and his world. As his life moves from Green to Red, he may only hope that the signal moves from Red to Green.

== Cast ==
- Kunal Khemu as Silsila
- Neetu Chandra as Rani
- Ranvir Shorey as Dominic D’Souza
- Konkona Sen Sharma as Noorie
- Vinay Apte as Inspector Zahid Sheikh
- Upendra Limaye as Mangaya
- Sudhir Mishra as Haji Bhaijaan
- Gopal K Singh as Samari
- Kapil Rajput as Vishal Ahuja
- Madhu Sharma as Businessman's Wife
- D. Santosh as Jaffar Bhaai
- Manoj Joshi as Chief Engineer Sailesh Jha
- Sandeep Kulkarni
- Naseer Abdullah as Sanjeev

== Soundtrack ==
1. "Aai Ga" – Vaishali Samant, Bhavika
2. "Aai Ga (Remix)" – Vaishali Samant, Bhavika
3. "Albela Saajan" – Kailash Kher
4. "Dilruba" – Kailash Kher
5. "Din Kuch Aise Guzarta Hai" – Jagjit Singh
6. "Haath Chhute Bhi To Rishtey Nahi Chhuta Karte" – Jagjit Singh
7. "Na Jis Din Teri Meri Baat Hoti Hai" – Bhupinder Singh
8. "Na Jis Din Teri Meri Baat Hoti Hai (Duet)" – Kunal Ganjawala, Yogita Pathak
9. "Piya Basanti" – Ustad Sultan Khan, K. S. Chithra
10. "Signal Pe" – Baba Sehgal, Vinod Rathod, Neerja Pandit, Raj Pandit, Navin Prabhakar
11. "Tere Bin Nahin Lagda" – Nusrat Fateh Ali Khan
12. "The Spirit of Signal" – Raju Singh
13. "Yeh Zindagi Hai To Kya Zindagi Hai" – Hariharan, Sangeet Haldipur

== Awards ==
- 2007: National Film Award for Best Direction for Madhur Bhandarkar
- 2007: Best Make-up Artist for Anil Moti Ram Palande

== Reception ==
This film is the last part of Madhur Bhandarkar's trilogy after Page 3 (2005) and Corporate (2006). Konkona Sen Sharma's acting was critically acclaimed and she got very good reviews from critics for her role. Reviews state that Konkona Sen Sharma is able to bring a shred of credibility to her part.
