= Tusshar Kapoor =

Indian actor and film producer (born 1976)

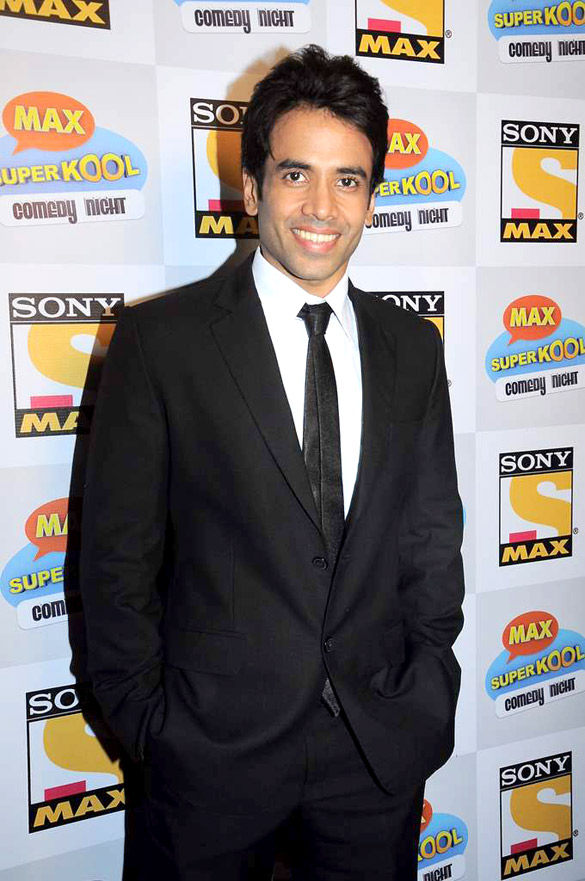
- Kapoor promoting Kyaa Super Kool Hain Hum in 2012
- Born: Tusshar Ravi Kapoor; 20 November 1976 (age 49); Bombay, Maharashtra, India
- Education: Ross School of Business
- Occupations: Actor; film producer
- Years active: 2001–present
- Children: 1
- Parents: Jeetendra (father); Shobha Kapoor (mother)
- Relatives: Ekta Kapoor (elder sister); Abhishek Kapoor (first cousin)

Tusshar Ravi Kapoor (born 20 November 1976) is an Indian actor and film producer who works in Hindi films.

== Early and personal life ==
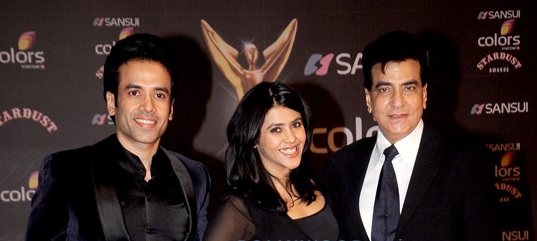
Jeetendra (right) with daughter Ekta (center) and son Tusshar (left) in 2016

Tusshar Ravi Kapoor is the son of actors Jeetendra and Shobha Kapoor. His elder sister, Ekta Kapoor is a television and film producer. He attended the Bombay Scottish School where he was in the same class as Abhishek Bachchan. He then studied at the University of Michigan in Ann Arbor for his BBA degree at the Stephen M. Ross School of Business.

Like his father, Tusshar Kapoor is a follower of Nichiren Buddhism. Kapoor is unmarried and opted for IVF to became a single parent to Laksshya Kapoor through surrogacy in June 2016.

== Career ==
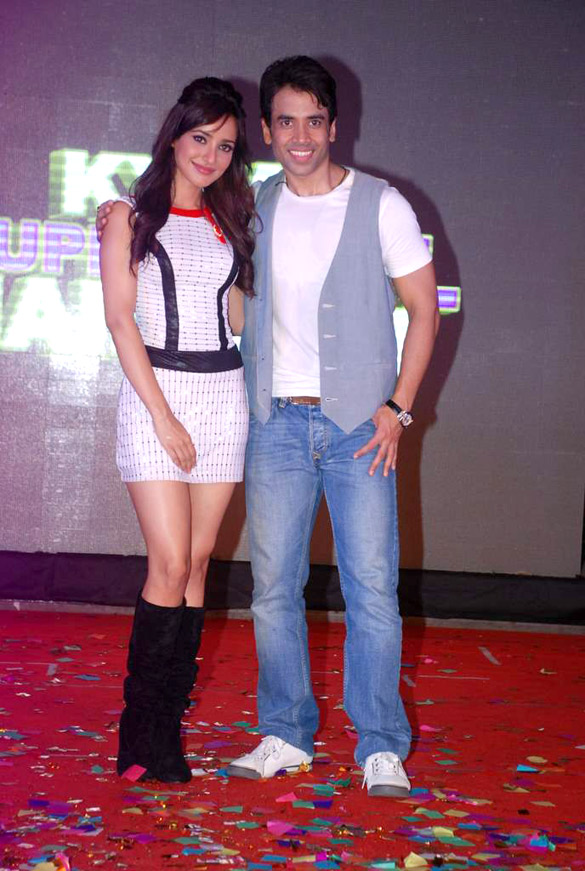
Kapoor with Neha Sharma during audio release of Kyaa Super Kool Hain Hum

Prior to making his debut as an actor, Kapoor worked with film director David Dhawan as an assistant. Following this, he trained as an actor with Roshan Taneja and Mahendra Verma, in their acting school, and in dance with Nimesh Bhatt.

He made his debut in 2001 under guidance of his Gujarat-based friend Dharmanshu Parmar alias Monty with the blockbuster Mujhe Kucch Kehna Hai, a remake of the Telugu super hit Tholi Prema, along with Kareena Kapoor. He received the Filmfare Award for Best Male Debut for his work in the film. He then starred as Rahul in a coming of age film Kyaa Dil Ne Kahaa alongside Esha Deol.

Kapoor starred in two more Telugu remakes Jeena Sirf Merre Liye (2002), and Yeh Dil (2003), which fared poorly at the box office. He then appeared in Ram Gopal Varma's production Gayab (2004) and received appreciation for his work though the film was declared below average at the box office. Starting in 2004, Kapoor starred in commercial hits such as Khakee (2004), Kyaa Kool Hai Hum (2005), Golmaal (2006), Shootout at Lokhandwala (2007) in which he essayed the role of gangster Dilip Buwa and received good reviews, Golmaal Returns (2008), Golmaal 3 (2010), The Dirty Picture (2011), Kyaa Super Kool Hain Hum (2012), the critically acclaimed Shor in the City (2012), and Shootout at Wadala (2013).

In 2012, Kapoor took part in the "Fashion for a Cause" event which raised money for homeless children. He has co-produced the film Chaar Din Ki Chandni (2012), in which he also starred. He also starred as the lead actor in adult comedies Kyaa Kool Hain Hum 3 (2016) and Mastizaade (2016) both of which have done average business at the box office.

In 2017 Kapoor once again starred as Lucky in Golmaal Again and the comedy film was a blockbuster. In 2018 he was seen in a cameo in the superhit Simmba, in the song Aankh Marey a part of which he has also voiced. In 2019, he starred as Manav in the ALT Balaji's web horror series Boo Sabki Phategi alongside Mallika Sherawat. In 2020 he produced Laxmii which starred Akshay Kumar, Kiara Advani, Sharad Kelkar and Ashwini Kalsekar. The film is co-produced by his production house Tushar Entertainment.

In 2021, he made his debut as an author with ‘Bachelor Dad’ published by Penguin. The book chronicles his journey as a single parent and addresses some issues facing single fathers. In 2022, Kapoor starred and produced crime-thriller film Maarrich. He played the role of Rajiv Dixit, a fearless cop who is on the hunt to find a murderer.

== Filmography ==
=== Films ===
Key
†	Denotes films that have not yet been released

Year	Title	Role(s)	Notes
2001	Mujhe Kucch Kehna Hai	Karan Sharma	Won - Filmfare Award for Best Male Debut
2002	Kyaa Dil Ne Kahaa	Rahul Vashisht	
2002	Jeena Sirf Merre Liye	Karan Malhotra	
2003	Kucch To Hai	Karan	
2003	Yeh Dil	Ravi Pratap Singh	
2004	Shart: The Challenge	Jai Kapoor	
2004	Gayab	Vishnu Prasad	
2004	Khakee	Sub Inspector Ashwin Gupte	
2005	Insan	Avinash Kapoor Rana	
2005	Kyaa Kool Hai Hum	Rahul/Sanju	
2006	Golmaal	Lucky Gill	Nominated - Filmfare Award for Best Performance in a Comic Role
2007	Good Boy, Bad Boy	Rajan Malhotra	
2007	Kya Love Story Hai	Arjun	
2007	Shootout at Lokhandwala	Dilip Buwa	
2007	Aggar	Aryan Mehta	
2007	Dhol	Sameer (Sam) Arya	
2007	Om Shanti Om	Himself	Guest appearance in the song "Deewangi"
2008	One Two Three	Laxmi Narayan	
2008	C Kkompany	Akshay Kumar	
2008	Halla Bol	Himself	Guest appearance
2008	Sunday	Himself	Guest appearance in the song "Manzar"
2008	Golmaal Returns	Lucky Gill	Nominated - Filmfare Award for Best Supporting Actor
2009	Life Partner	Bhavesh Patel	
2010	Golmaal 3	Lucky Gill	
2011	Shor in the City	Thilack	
2011	Love U...Mr. Kalakaar!	Sahil	
2011	Hum Tum Shabana	Rishi Malhotra	
2011	The Dirty Picture	Ramakanth	
2012	Chaar Din Ki Chandni	Veer Vikram Singh	
2012	Kyaa Super Kool Hai Hum	Aditya (Adi) / John	
2013	Shootout at Wadala	Sheikh Munir	
2013	Bajatey Raho	Sukhwinder (Sukhi) Baweja	
2016	Kyaa Kool Hain Hum 3	Kanhaiya	
2016	Mastizaade	Sunny Kele	
2017	Poster Boys	Himself	Cameo appearance
2017	Golmaal Again	Lucky Gill	
2018	Simmba	Himself	Guest appearance in song "Aankh Maarey"
2020	Laxmii	—N/a	Producer
2022	Maarrich	Rajiv Dixit	Also producer
2024	Love Sex Aur Dhokha 2	Himself	Cameo appearance
2025	Kapkapiii	Kabir	
2025	Mastiii 4	Pablo Putinwa	
2026	Welcome to the Jungle	Benny	
TBA	Golmaal 5 †	Filming	

=== Web series ===
Year	Title	Role	Notes
2019	Booo Sabki Phategi	Gopal	ALT Balaji series
2023	Pop Kaun?	Cameo	Disney Plus Hotstar series
2024-2025	Dus June ki Raat	Panauti	JioCinema series
