= Sachin Yardi =

Indian film director

- Born: India
- Occupations: Film director, screenwriter
- Spouse: Ashvini Yardi

Sachin Yardi is a Hindi film director and screenwriter from India. His directorial debut C Kkompany (2008) was after writing scripts for Kyaa Kool Hai Hum (2005) and Madhur Bhandarkar's award-winning Traffic Signal (2007).

== Filmography ==
Year	Film	Credited as		Note.
Year	Film	Director	Screenwriter	Note.
2005	Kyaa Kool Hai Hum	No	Yes	also Story and Dialogues
2007	Traffic Signal	No	Yes	
2008	C Kkompany	Yes	Yes	Directorial debut
2012	Kyaa Super Kool Hai Hum	Yes	Yes	also Story and Dialogues
2019	Chopsticks	Yes	Yes	Netflix film
