= Mandana Karimi =

Iranian actress and model (born 1988)

- ماندانا کریمی
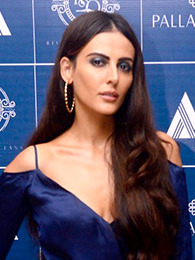
- Karimi in 2018
- Born: Manizhe Karimi (منیژه کریمی); 19 May 1988 (age 38); Tehran, Iran
- Occupations: Actress, model
- Years active: 2010–2022
- Known for: Bigg Boss 9; Kyaa Kool Hain Hum 3
- Height: 178 cm (5 ft 10 in)
- Spouse: Gaurav Gupta (m. 2017; div. 2021)

Mandana Karimi (Persian: ماندانا کریمی, romanized: Māndānā Karīmī; born Manizhe Karimi (Persian: منیژه کریمی, romanized: Manīža Karīmī); 19 May 1988) is an Iranian actress. After working on several successful modelling projects around the world, she appeared as a lead in the Bollywood film, Bhaag Johnny. She participated in the popular reality TV show, Bigg Boss 9 and became the 2nd runner up in 2015.

== Early life ==
Karimi was born on 19 May 1988 in Tehran, Iran, into a Muslim family. Her father has Iranian and Indian ancestry and her mother is a Persian. She was raised in Tehran. About her Indian connection she commented, "I had come to India many times, visiting my family or for holidays."

== Career ==
Karimi started her career as an air hostess, and later quit that job to pursue a career in modelling. In 2010, after working on various international modelling projects, she came to Mumbai for three months on a modelling contract. About her experience in India she said, "I had a different experience, staying without my family. I absolutely loved it! Work was great, but at that time, I had other contracts around the world. Then, in 2013, I decided to move to Mumbai and try acting."

Karimi has done TV commercials with Shahrukh Khan, Saif Ali Khan, Kareena Kapoor, Shahid Kapoor and Arjun Kapoor.

In February 2015, she made a guest appearance in the film Roy. Later that year, in September, her movie Bhaag Johnny was released. She also appeared in the October 2015 film, Main Aur Charles, where she played the role of Charles Sobhraj's assistant. Karimi's next film, Kyaa Kool Hain Hum 3, a sexual comedy, was released on 22 January 2016.

Karimi was a contestant in the reality TV show, Bigg Boss 9, where a group of celebrities from various walks of life live together in a large house. One of the contestants is eliminated every week, based on public votes. The show went on air in October 2015 on Colors. She was one of the three finalists of the season and ended up as a runner-up.

In 2018, she joined Star Plus's Ishqbaaaz as Nancy.

In October 2018, Karimi accused Umesh Ghadge the director of Kyaa Kool Hain Hum 3 of sexual harassment. She had also accused director Sajid Khan of sexual harassment at the time and expressed her intention to quit Bollywood after Khan appeared as contestant on Bigg Boss 16 in 2022.

Mandana participated in an Indian TV reality show called Lock Upp.

== Personal life ==
In an interview, Karimi said, "The first film that I watched was Sholay when I was 8 or 9 years old. My father was one of the few people in Iran who possessed a tape of the film, though the Government didn't allow to keep video cassettes." She further commented, "Mainly, I've grown up watching Iranian films, especially by directors like Majid Majidi and my favourite actress is Golshifteh Farahani."

Karimi speaks Persian, English and Hindi.

In July 2016, Karimi got engaged to her boyfriend, Gaurav Gupta, an Indian businessman from Mumbai. The couple married in court in early March the following year, which was followed by a lavish Hindu wedding in March 2017. She had shortly before converted from Islam to Hinduism.

In July 2017, Karimi filed a domestic violence case against her husband and his family, which she later withdrew in hopes of saving her marriage. They got divorced in 2021.

== Filmography ==
=== Films ===
Year	Title	Role	Language
2015	Roy	Anita	Hindi
2015	Bhaag Johnny	Rachel D'costa	Hindi
2015	Main Aur Charles	Liz	Hindi
2016	Kyaa Kool Hain Hum 3	Shalu	Hindi
2016	Xuanzang	Rajyashri	Mandarin, Sanskrit
2022	Thar	Cheryl	Hindi

=== Television ===
Year	Title	Role	Notes
2015–2016	Bigg Boss 9	Contestant	2nd runner-up
2016	Bigg Boss 10	Herself	Guest
2018	Ishqbaaaz	Nancy Malhotra	
2020	The Casino	Rehana Chaudhari	
2022	Lock Upp	Contestant	Entered in Day 23 and evicted on Day 49
