= Kyaa Kool Hain Hum =

2005 Indian film by Sangeeth Sivan

Kyaa Kool Hai Hum
- Poster
- Directed by: Sangeeth Sivan
- Written by: Sachin Yardi; Pankaj Trivedi
- Produced by: Ekta Kapoor; Shobha Kapoor
- Starring: Tusshar Kapoor; Riteish Deshmukh; Isha Koppikar; Neha Dhupia; Anupam Kher
- Narrated by: Johnny Lever
- Cinematography: Ramji
- Edited by: Chirag Jain; Bunty Nagi
- Music by: Songs: Anu Malik; Score: Franco Vaz
- Production company: Balaji Motion Pictures
- Distributed by: UTV Motion Pictures
- Release date: 6 May 2005
- Running time: 172 minutes
- Country: India
- Language: Hindi
- Budget: ₹5 crore
- Box office: ₹22.85 crore

Kyaa Kool Hain Hum (transl. How Cool Are We), also known as KKHH, is a 2005 Indian Hindi-language adult comedy film directed by Sangeeth Sivan and produced by Ekta Kapoor. The film stars Tusshar Kapoor and Ritesh Deshmukh. It is the first installment of the Kyaa Kool Hain Hum series and emerged as a sleeper hit despite mixed reviews from critics.

== Plot ==
Rahul is sincere and hardworking, while Karan Pandey is just the opposite. Both are best friends and cool wannabes. When they are evicted from their flat, they both enter their flat from the back of the apartment and live secretly. They try to find girlfriends and secretly enter a college reunion party from where they are thrown out after being caught. Karan tricks a girl into roaming with him by stealing a car but gets caught by the police and gets beaten up. He lies to Rahul that he had fun with the girl. While running from tailor Popat, Rahul is advised by a baba that his true love will have a mole on her chest.

When the city is rocked with a series of rapes and killings, the police, along with psychiatrist/psychologist Dr. Screwvala, are in search of this dreaded serial killer. Due to some misunderstanding, Rahul becomes the prime suspect. Meanwhile, Karan gets beaten up by a violent lady inspector and again lies about the incident to Rahul. Things take a funny turn when the job of nabbing Rahul is entrusted to Urmila Martodkar. Urmila and Doctor again misinterpret Rahul's actions. Urmila is taken to a salon and kept gagged with tape on her mouth while the doctor instructs how she has to be disguised while she moans through the tape on her mouth. She meets Rahul in a complete makeover as a hot woman. Rahul falls in love with her and invites her to live in his flat secretly. She tries to seduce him in sexy clothes to reveal his true nature, and she loves him back, not remembering she is on a police force mission. By this time, Karan falls in love with D.K., i.e., his boss's ex Kiran, who is actually the brother of Rekha, a psychologist and Karan's ex-college mate.

After a roller coaster ride of mistaken identities and comedy of errors, the film reaches its peak when Karan is about to wed Kiran at the temple, but he is not aware that she is a transvestite, but Rekha and D.K. reach on time, where D.K. takes Kiran away and Rekha reveals that it was she who used to call and write letters to him in the name of Kiran. Karan realises his true love and reunites with her. The police are on the verge of arresting Rahul as the rapist when the true rapist reveals himself and turns out to be Uma Shankar Tripathi and is arrested by police. Rahul and Urmila reunite, and the film ends.

== Cast ==
- Tusshar Kapoor as Rahul Khanna / Sanju
- Riteish Deshmukh as Karan Pandey / Guddu / D.K. Bose
- Isha Koppikar as Sub Inspector Urmila Matondkar
- Neha Dhupia as Rekha Kapoor
- Rajendranath Zutshi as D.K. Bose
- Anupam Kher as Dr. S. Screwvala
- Shoma Anand as Parvati Singhania
- Bobby Darling as Kiran Jhangiani
- Sushmita Mukherjee as Hira Hingorani
- Anil Nagrath as Flat owner
- Dinesh Hingoo as Flat buyer
- Vijay Patkar as Inspector Havaldar
- Avtar Gill as Police Commissioner
- Razzak Khan as Popat (Laundry wala)
- Rana Jung Bahadur as Watchman
- Rajpal Yadav as Uma Shankar Tripathi / Rapist (cameo appearance)
- Sophiya Chaudhary as Host of MTV Style Night (special appearance)
- Jay Sean in a special appearance in the song 'Dil Mera'
- Juggy D in a special appearance in the song 'Dil Mera'
- Veronica Mehta in a special appearance in the song 'Dil Mera'
- Rishi Rich in a special appearance in the song 'Dil Mera'

== Soundtrack ==
Kya Kool Hai Hum

Soundtrack album by Anu Malik
- Released: 17 March 2005
- Genre: Feature film soundtrack
- Label: T-Series

The songs were composed by Anu Malik.

No.	Title	Singer(s)	Length
1.	"Chaska"	Kunal Ganjawala, Sunidhi Chauhan
2.	"Dil Mera (One Night)"	Jay Sean, Juggy D, Rishi Rich
3.	"Kya Kool Hain Hum"	Anu Malik, KK, Kunal Ganjawala
4.	"We Are So Different"	Shaan, Sunidhi Chauhan, Kunal Ganjawala
5.	"Jaago Na"	Sunidhi Chauhan, Sowmya Raoh, Gayatri

== Reception ==
Taran Adarsh of IndiaFM gave the film 3 stars out of 5, writing ″On the whole, KYAA KOOL HAI HUM is a refreshing, fun-filled entertainer targeted at the youth mainly. At the box-office, the film should sail safe on the basis of the youth brigade. Its business at multiplexes during the weekends mainly will be heartening. Has the potential to grow with a good word of mouth!″

Conversely, Raja Sen of Rediff.com called the film ″Lukewarm″, writing "Kya Kool Hai Hum starts well, sags in the middle, and ends on a surprisingly spry high—which would be acceptable enough, if only the flabby middle wasn't two hours and 40 minutes long."
