= Ekta Kapoor =

Indian film/TV producer, director (born 1975)

Ekta R. Kapoor
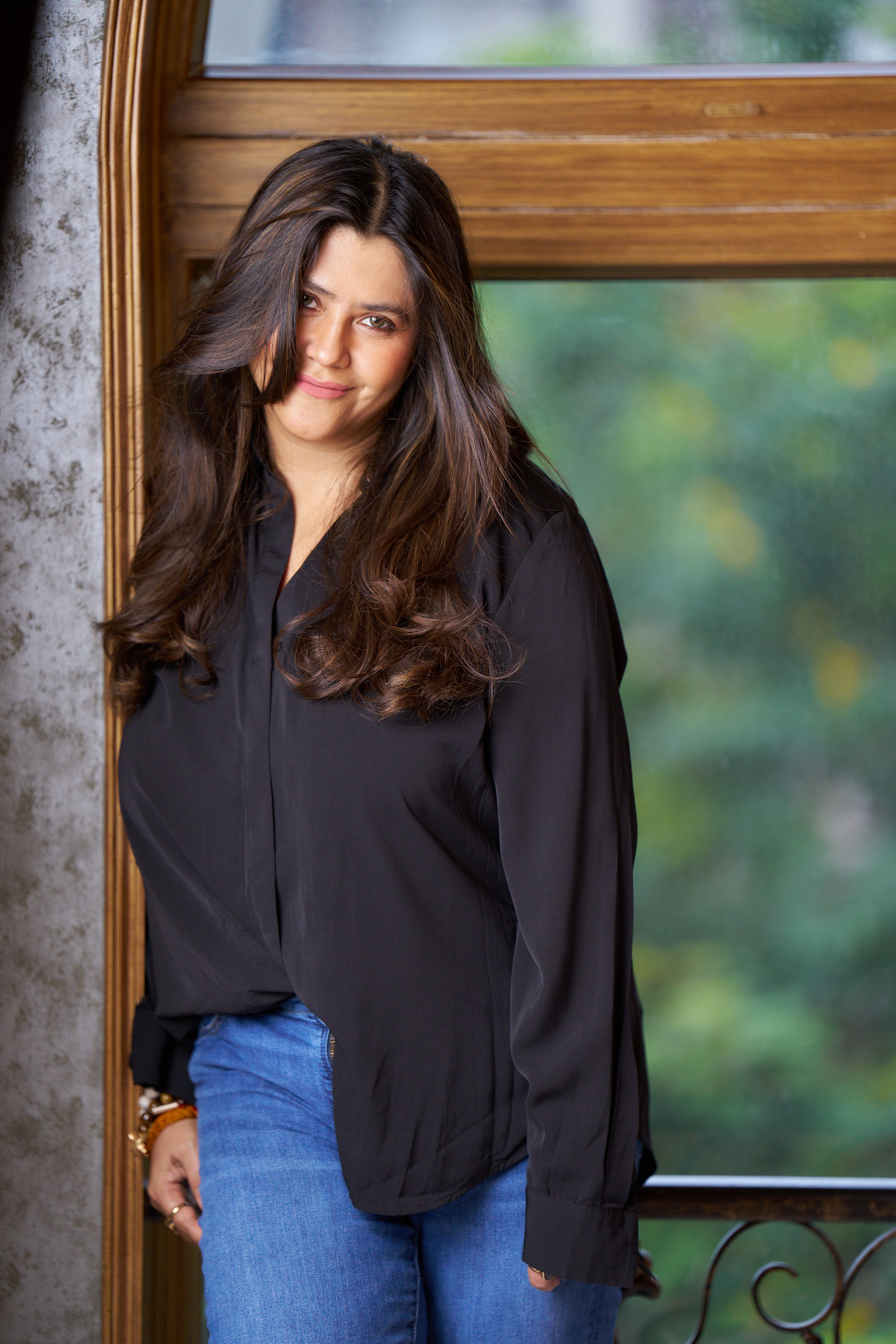
- Kapoor in 2025
- Born: 7 June 1975 (age 51); Bombay, Maharashtra, India
- Education: Mithibai College
- Occupations: Television producer; film producer
- Years active: 1995–present
- Organizations: Balaji Telefilms; Balaji Motion Pictures
- Children: 1
- Parents: Jeetendra (father); Shobha Kapoor (mother)
- Relatives: Tushar Kapoor (brother); Abhishek Kapoor (cousin)
- Awards: International Emmy Directorate Award (2023)
- Honours: Padma Shri (2020)

Ekta R. Kapoor (born 7 June 1975) is an Indian television and film producer, known for her work in Hindi television and Bollywood cinema. She is the founder of Balaji Telefilms Limited, where she serves as joint managing director and creative head.

Kapoor began her career at the age of 17 and became known for producing a large number of television soap operas in Hindi, many of which gained significant popularity during the late 1990s and 2000s. Her biggest success came in 2000 with Kyunki Saas Bhi Kabhi Bahu Thi on StarPlus which had the highest TRP for an Indian serial with 22.4 and was the most successful serial at its time. She followed it with Kahaani Ghar Ghar Kii (2000) and Kasautii Zindagii Kay (2001) to become the Queen of Indian television. In 2001, Balaji Motion Pictures was launched and produced several films including The Dirty Picture, Lootera, Main Tera Hero, Dream Girl, Crew, and The Sabarmati Report.

In April 2017, she launched ALTBalaji, a video on demand platform. In 2025, this app was banned by the Government of India on OTT Platforms for over obscene and vulgar content.In 2017, Kapoor also launched her biography, Kingdom of the Soap Queen: The Story of Balaji Telefilms.

Kapoor was honored with the Padma Shri in 2020 for her work in the field of arts. She is also honored with the 2023 International Emmy Directorate Award at the 51st International Emmy Awards.

== Personal life ==
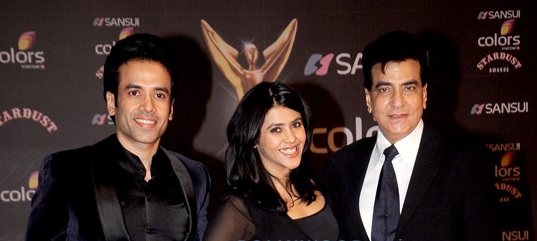
Kapoor (center) with younger brother Tusshar (left) and father Jeetendra (right)

Kapoor is the daughter of actors Jeetendra and Shobha Kapoor. Her younger brother, Tusshar Kapoor, is also a Bollywood actor.

She went to school at Bombay Scottish School, Mahim and attended college at Mithibai College.

Kapoor is not married but she has a son who was born on 27 January 2019 by surrogacy. She had previously frozen her eggs at the age of 36 and later used in vitro fertilization (IVF) as part of the surrogacy process.

=== Beliefs ===
During the early 2000s, Ekta Kapoor produced several Hindi television dramas, including Kyunki Saas Bhi Kabhi Bahu Thi, which received high viewership. Around the same time, she produced a number of other series with titles beginning with the letter "K," such as Kahaani Ghar Ghar Kii and Kasautii Zindagii Kay. Kapoor has mentioned in interviews that this naming trend was influenced by her belief in astrology, particularly the significance of certain letters. Kapoor has also spoken about her spiritual beliefs, identifying as Hindu and describing herself as more spiritual than religious.

== Career ==
Ekta Kapoor started her career at the age of 17, interning with advertisement and feature filmmaker Kailash Surendranath. After obtaining financing from her father, she was a producer under her banner, Balaji Telefilms. Her initial projects were failures, with six of her pilot episodes being rejected, leading to a total loss of ₹50 lakh (equivalent to ₹2.2 crore or US$230,000 in 2026). In 1995, Mano Ya Na Mano was selected by Zee TV, and her music-based show Dhun Dhamaka was chosen by Doordarshan. Her 1995 sitcom, Hum Paanch was her first success.

In the 2000s, the letter 'K' became her lucky alphabet, and she launched many shows with the first word of every title starting with the same letter, including Kyunki Saas Bhi Kabhi Bahu Thi, which broke all records to become the series to attract the highest TRPs in 2000. Other shows beginning with 'K' include Kahaani Ghar Ghar Ki, Kabhii Sautan Kabhii Sahelii, Kohi Apna Sa, Kaahin Kissii Roz, Kalash, Kasautii Zindagii Kay, Kahiin To Hoga, and Kasamh Se. In 2001, she was awarded the title of Best Entrepreneur of the Year.

By July 2001, Kapoor was producing more than 30 hours of television shows per week. 20 of her 34 serials were listed as the most popular serials across all major TV channels like Zee TV, Sony, Star Plus, and Metro. Her projected turnover for 2000–2001 was listed as ₹35 crore (equivalent to ₹152 crore or US$16 million in 2026).

After establishing herself in Hindi TV serials, she began venturing into other regional languages, starting with the Tamil series, Kudumbum. The series became very popular, and she then had it dubbed into Telugu and launched it in Hindi as Ghar Ek Mandir. She then ventured into Punjabi, Marathi, Gujarati, and Bengali languages. As of 2001, Kapoor wrote her own scripts despite having writers working for her, taking an active interest in all stages of production, while her mother, Shobha, handled the accounts.

Kapoor has thus created and produced more than 130 Indian soap operas. Some of her other popular shows include Pavitra Rishta, Bade Achhe Lagte Hain, Yeh Hai Mohabbatein, Jodha Akbar, Naagin, Kumkum Bhagya, Kasam Tere Pyaar Ki, Kundali Bhagya, Yeh Hai Chahatein, and several others that were credited with starting a new wave on Indian television, leading to her being known as the "Czarina of Television" and "the Queen of Indian Television".

She ventured into Bollywood movie production in 2001, beginning with Kyo Kii... Main Jhuth Nahin Bolta, starring Sushmita Sen and Govinda. Kucch To Hai and Krishna Cottage, based on supernatural themes, followed in 2003 and 2004. The 2005 Kyaa Kool Hai Hum featured her brother Tusshar Kapoor. She then went on to co-produce Shootout at Lokhandwala with Sanjay Gupta. This was followed by Mission Istanbul and EMI – Liya Hai Toh Chukana Padhega in collaboration with Sunil Shetty. None of these films were commercial or critical successes.

Between 2010 and 2014, she produced many successful films, including Love Sex aur Dhokha, Once Upon a Time in Mumbaai, and Shor in the City.

In 2012, Ekta Kapoor started the Institute of Creative Excellence, a media training school, through her production house, Balaji Telefilms.

In 2026, Kapoor produced Lock Upp: Sach Ya Sazaa, the second season of the reality television series Lock Upp. The season streamed on Netflix and was hosted by Farah Khan and Riteish Deshmukh as jailers. Shreya Kalra emerged as the winner of the season, receiving a cash prize of ₹1 crore.

== Criticism ==
=== Repetitive storytelling and excessive melodrama ===
Ekta Kapoor's television productions, particularly the daily soaps produced by Balaji Telefilms during the late 1990s and 2000s, have frequently been criticised for relying on repetitive storylines, prolonged conflicts and excessive melodrama. Several of her popular serials, including Kyunki Saas Bhi Kabhi Bahu Thi, Kahaani Ghar Ghar Kii and Kasautii Zindagii Kay, became associated with elaborate family disputes, misunderstandings, dramatic confrontations and frequent plot twists.

The shows were also known for their extended storylines, which sometimes involved characters returning after presumed deaths, changes in identities, reincarnation and major time jumps. Critics argued that these narrative devices prioritised dramatic twists and audience retention over consistent storytelling. The format subsequently influenced a large section of Indian television, with many other daily soaps adopting similar storytelling techniques.

=== Portrayal of women and regressive gender roles ===
Kapoor's television serials have faced criticism for their portrayal of women and traditional family structures. Although female characters frequently occupy central roles, critics have argued that their stories often revolve around marriage, family disputes, sacrifice and conflicts between daughters-in-law and mothers-in-law.

The popular saas-bahu format, particularly in serials such as Kyunki Saas Bhi Kabhi Bahu Thi and Kahaani Ghar Ghar Kii, has been criticised for repeatedly presenting women as rivals within the family. The distinction between the idealised, self-sacrificing woman and the antagonistic female character has also been questioned for reinforcing conventional expectations of women's behaviour.

Academic discussions of the K-serials have offered a more complex interpretation. While the shows brought daughters-in-law and female protagonists to the centre of Indian prime-time television, scholars have questioned whether the agency given to these characters was limited by traditional ideas of family, femininity and religious identity.

=== Superstition and supernatural storylines ===
Another criticism of Kapoor's television productions concerns their frequent use of supernatural elements and dramatic twists. Productions such as Naagin popularised supernatural family dramas involving shape-shifting snakes, reincarnation, curses, revenge and mystical powers.

Critics have questioned the extent to which such storylines contribute to the normalisation of superstition and increasingly unrealistic narratives in mainstream television. The popularity of these programmes also helped establish supernatural fiction as a recurring format in Indian daily soaps.

=== Influence on the Indian television industry ===
Kapoor's production formula has also been criticised for encouraging a degree of creative uniformity in Indian television. Her success with family dramas led several production houses and television channels to adopt similar formats, particularly stories centred on extended families, domestic conflicts and prolonged melodrama.

A 2025 analysis by Hindustan Times observed that a large number of Indian television programmes continued to follow the format established by Balaji Telefilms. The article also questioned the industry's reliance on familiar storytelling formulas and the limited success of programmes attempting different approaches.

This criticism has therefore extended beyond individual serials to the wider influence of Kapoor's productions on the direction of Indian television.

=== PewDiePie's criticism of Indian television serials (2018) ===
In May 2018, Swedish YouTuber PewDiePie (Felix Kjellberg) attracted attention after mocking the production quality and dramatic editing of Kasamh Se, a television serial produced by Balaji Telefilms. He initially posted a pixelated screenshot from the programme with the sarcastic caption "good quality" and subsequently uploaded a spoof video criticising the show's dramatic presentation and excessive visual effects.

The video received attention among Indian social media users and was widely discussed in Indian entertainment media. Kapoor responded to the criticism on Twitter, comparing PewDiePie to foreign junior artists hired for television productions. The exchange developed into a wider online dispute, with PewDiePie subsequently publishing another video addressing Kapoor's response.

The incident brought international attention to the criticism of Indian daily soaps, particularly their visual presentation, dramatic editing and exaggerated storytelling conventions.

=== Response to criticism ===
Kapoor has defended her television productions against accusations of being regressive, arguing that melodramatic storytelling and traditional visual elements should not automatically be equated with regressive ideas. She has also pointed to programmes addressing subjects such as marital rape, women's independence and transgender representation.

In a 2017 interview with The Indian Express, she acknowledged that her shows had received criticism but argued that attempts to introduce more progressive storylines had not always been accepted by television audiences. In a 2018 opinion piece published by Outlook, she further defended the representation of women in her serials, citing characters such as Tulsi from Kyunki Saas Bhi Kabhi Bahu Thi and Parvati from Kahaani Ghar Ghar Kii as examples of strong female protagonists.

== Accolades ==
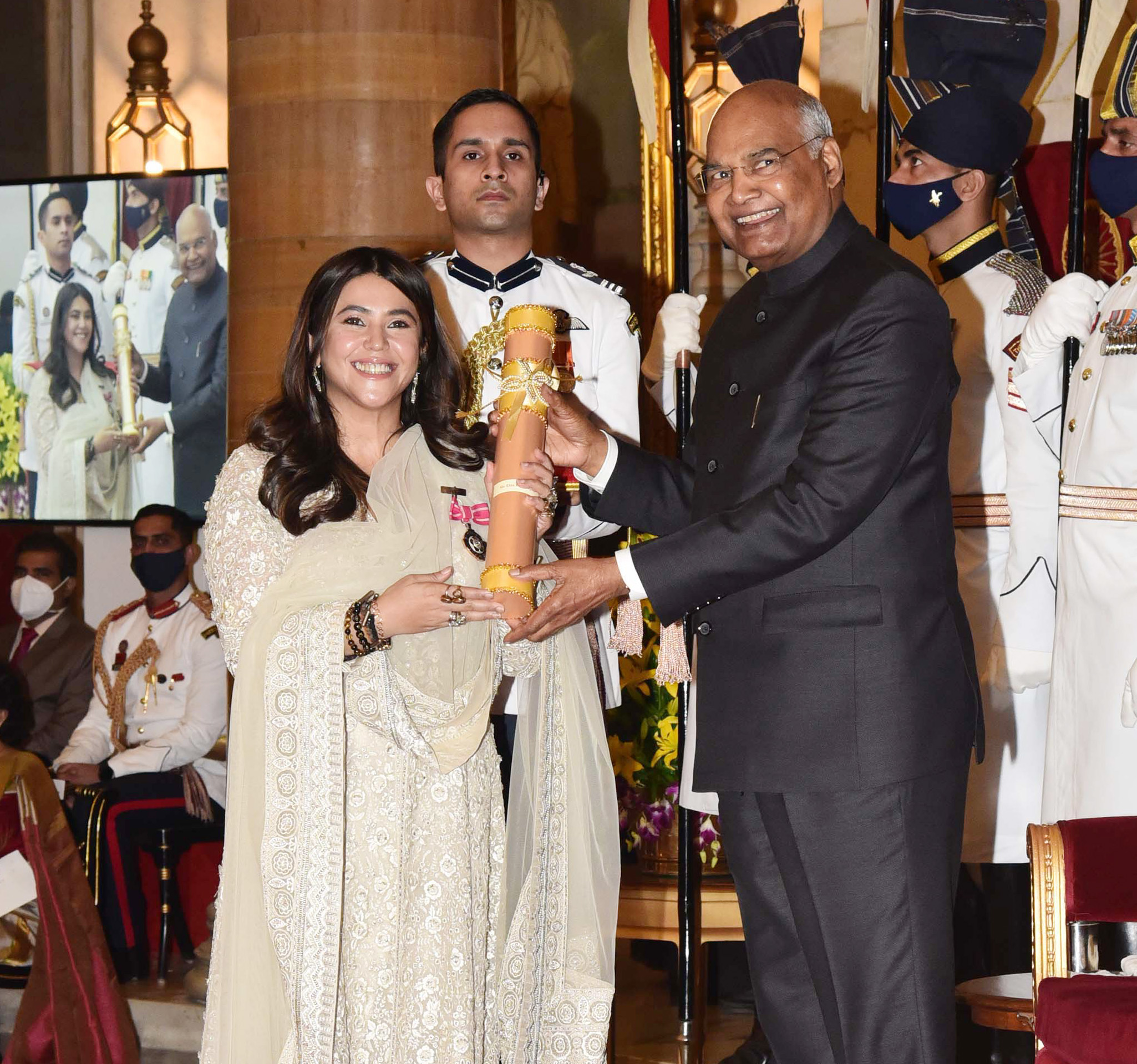
Kapoor being awarded Padma Shri, c. 2021

Kapoor also works on scriptwriting, creative conversion, and concept building. Having been chosen as one of 50 of ‘Asia's Most Powerful Communicators’ by Asia Week magazine in 2001, she has helped launch the careers of many actors and actresses.

She was chosen to lead the Confederation of Indian Industries (CII) entertainment committee. The other awards she received are; The Society Achiever Award and The Best Entrepreneur of the Year 2001.

Kapoor is regarded as one of the most powerful ladies in the television industry and is amongst the top 25 woman entrepreneurs of India.

She was awarded the Padma Shri, the fourth highest civilian honor, in 2020 for her work in the field of arts.

Kapoor has also received awards as the producer of Balaji Telefilms. These include the Indian Television Academy Awards, Indian Telly Awards, Kalakar Awards, Asian Television Awards, Apsara Awards, Zee Rishtay Awards, 3rd Boroplus Awards, New Talent Awards, BIG Star Entertainment Awards, 4th Boroplus Awards, GR8! Women Awards, Asia's Social Empowerment Awards, Lions Gold Awards, Stardust Awards, Screen Awards, Pune International Film Festival, Zee Gaurav Puraskar, National Media Network Film and TV Awards, the Global Indian Film and TV Honors, and ETC Bollywood Business Awards.

The following is the recent list of awards received by Kapoor:

| Year | Award | Category | Ref |
|---|---|---|---|
| 2017 | Indian Television Academy Awards | Sterling Icon of Entertainment | |
| 2018 | Business Today | Most Powerful Woman in Indian Business | |
| 2018 | FICCI Ladies Organisation | Icon of the Year | |
| 2018 | Indian Television Academy Awards | Highest rated Show on TV – Naagin (season 3) | |
| 2018 | Indian Television Academy Awards | Premiere Web Channel of the Year – ALTBalaji | |
| 2018 | Jagran Cinema Summit Awards | Icon of Entertainment | |
| 2018 | Forbes Tycoon of Tomorrow | Icon of Excellence | |
| 2018 | Outlook India Speakout Awards | Woman Achiever of the Year | |
| 2019 | Hindustan Times Business Awards | Business Icon of Continent | |
| 2019 | ET Business Awards | Content Creator of the Year | |
| 2019 | Business Today | Most Powerful Woman in Indian Business | |
| 2019 | Businessworld | BW Most Influential Woman of India | |
| 2019 | Hindustan Times | HT Most Stylish Film Maker of the Year | |
| 2019 | Fortune India Awards | Most Powerful Business Women of the Year | |
| 2020 | Padma Shri | India's fourth highest civilian honour in the field of Arts, from the Government of India | |
| 2023 | 51st International Emmy Awards | International Emmy Directorate Award | |
