= Bollywood Monster Mashup =

Bollywood Festival in Mississauga

#BollywoodMonster Mashup (festival)
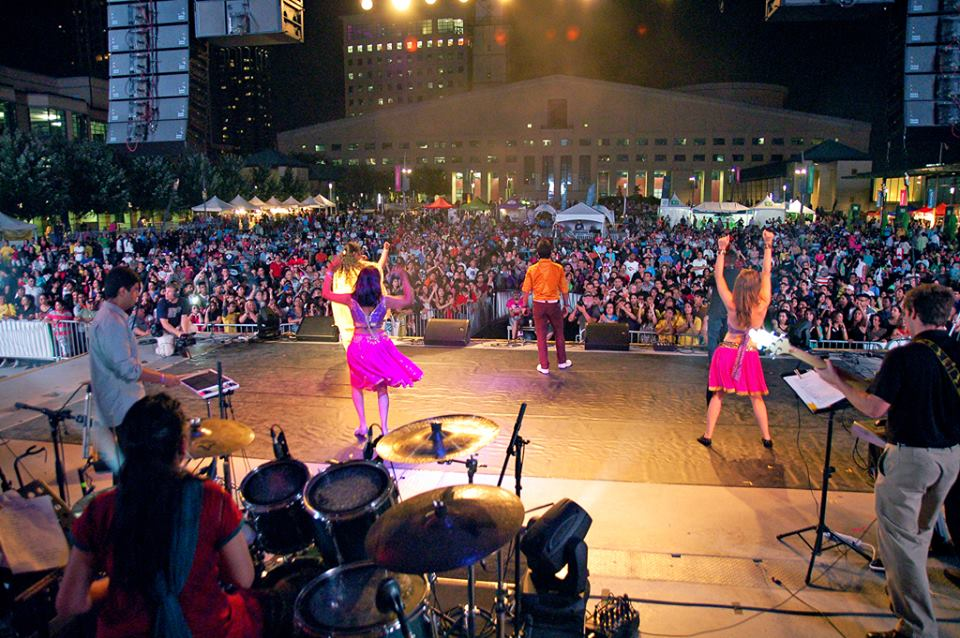
- Rajdeep Chatterjee performing at #BollywoodMonster Mashup 2014
- Genre: Bollywood
- Dates: 3-day In late July
- Frequency: Annually
- Venue: Mississauga Celebration Square
- Locations: Mississauga, Ontario, Canada
- Country: Canada
- Years active: 2011-present
- Founder: Vikas Kohli
- Major events: Food and Music Festival
- Organiser: monstrARTity Creative Community
- Website: bollywoodmonstermashup.com

The Bollywood Monster Mashup (stylized #BollywoodMonster Mashup) is a free annual summer Arts festival festival held at Mississauga Celebration Square in Mississauga, Ontario, Canada. It was founded by Vikas Kohli in 2011 and is currently produced by monstrARTity (aka MonsterArtsfor-profit organization that also has a South Asian arts in school program, a South Asian arts for seniors program and an entrepreneurship program for people practicing South Asian arts.

The festival began as a free outdoor concert with cross-cultural fusion performances by Canadian musicians and dancers as well as Canadian premiers from Bollywood Playback singers from India, such as Monali Thakur (2011), Ash King (2015), Nikhita Gandhi (2019), Yasser Desai (2019), Khushboo Grewal (2018), Aaman Trikha (2018), Aishwarya Nigam (2016), Rajdeep Chatterjee (2012), Bishakh Jyoti (2016), Sanchari Bose (2016), and Aishwarya Pandit (2023). Other notable Bollywood acts include Sunny Leone (2020, 2022), Kavita Krishnamurthy (2024), Karanvir Bohra (2013) and Javed Ali (2021).

Over the years, it has added over 50 street food vendors such as Kebabs, Momo (food), Kulfi, Biryani, Panipuri, Pav bhaji, Vada pav, Chole bhature as well as fusion foods such as Butter chicken x Pasta, Chocolate x Dosa (food), etc. During the day there are free family activities such as Inflatable rides, free face painting, free kids crafts, a free seniors lounge, free swag from sponsors, cash Door prizes and shopping vendors such as jewellery, clothes, toys, etc.

The festival attracts an estimated 30,000 to 40,000 in-person attendees each day for an estimated 60,000 to 80,000 weekend total.

== Awards & Accolades ==
Year	Achievement	Organization
2018	Ranked #1 Festival at Celebration Square	City of Mississauga
2019	MARTY Award (Festival of the Year)	Mississauga Arts Council
2020	MARTY Award (Virtual Festival of the Year)	Mississauga Arts Council
2022	Ranked #1 Festival at Celebration Square	City of Mississauga
2022	Featured on the cover of 5-year Strategic Plan	Ontario Arts Council
2023	Civic Award from the Mayor	City of Mississauga
2024	Top 100 Festival	Festivals and Events Ontario

== History ==
=== 2011: Origin ===
#BollywoodMonster Mashup began as a single evening of live music and dance concert produced by FatLabs on June 24, 2011 in Mississauga for the International Indian Film Academy Awards (IIFA). It was headlined by Monali Thakur for her premier Canadian performance and included 54 other performers. The original production #BollywoodMonster Orchestra: Rock Symphony performed with members of the Toronto Symphony Orchestra. Carnatic music artists performed mashups with an Electronic music artist of early Cinema of India songs from Kishore Kumar, Lata Mangeshkar and Asha Bhosle. Bollywood dance artists did a mashup with Dhol artists and Video art.

=== 2012 - 2019: Expansions ===
On the night of July 28, Bollywood singer Rajdeep Chatterjee headlined the 2012 #BollywoodMonster Mashup, which was now an independent festival. This was Rajdeep's premier performance in Canada where he and Vikas Kohli led an estimated 15,000 attendees in a sing-a-long tribute to Indian actor Rajesh Khanna, who passed away weeks earlier. Other acts included the original production Bollywood Monster Orchestra: Choir, made up of 60 singers, who performed classic songs from films like Hum Dil De Chuke Sanam, Silsila (1981 film), Bobby (1973 film), and Pakeezah.

In 2013, #BollywoodMonster Mashup expanded its programming to a full day of activities. The August 24 event drew an estimated 25,000 attendees and included a film festival, media arts workshop and youth arts workshops. Headlining the festival was Kamal Khan (singer) who had recently won Zee Cine Awards, Mirchi Music Awards, Global Indian Music Academy Awards, People's Choice Awards India, and Screen Awards for the song Ishq Sufiyana; other acts included the Kaleidoscope Chinese Performing Arts Society (KCPA) as part of the original Bollywood Monster Orchestra: "Dragon Orchestra" arranged by Vikas Kohli and Brandon Rozen, featuring singers Ferzana, Himanshu Merchant, Tanveer Badar and more.

In 2014, the festival was 7 days, beginning August 22 and ending August 30 and included gourmet food, free kids activities, laughter yoga, a free film festival, and free dance lessons. Headlining the festival was Rajdeep Chatterjee who has voiced songs for Akshay Kumar; along with Bosco–Caesar Dance Company (BCDC) performing to an estimated 41,000 people. The original production #BollywoodMonster Orchestra: Double Take by Artistic Director Vikas Kohli performed mashups of western Billboard Top 40 songs x Bollywood hits. There was also a #BollywoodMonster Comedy Night featuring Wilbur Sargunaraj and hosted by Ali Hassan (comedian), a VIP reception with Miss India Canada, a paint night, and a Media Summit to help artists pitch to industry mentors.

In 2015, #BollywoodMonster Mashup took place over six days. The August 3–9 festival featured headliners Ash King and Jonita Gandhi. This was Ash King's premier Canadian performance. Karanvir Bohra did a surprise celebrity meet & greet at the event. Other acts included a professional Bollywood dance troupe, a West-Indian steel pan group and a Tassa band. The event also featured a Bollywood Monster Film Festival and a Bollywood Monster Film Shorts curated by Toronto Reel Asian International Film Festival. The additional days included a VIP reception, a comedy night featuring Aparna Nancherla, Ali Hassan (comedian) and DJ night.

Aishwarya Nigam headlined the 2016 #BollywoodMonster Mashup festival with for his premier Canadian performance. The July 22–23 event also included premier Canadian performances by Sanchari Bose and Bishakh Jyoti. The BollywoodMonster Orchestra performed with western classical string section and there was an Indo-Caribbean music segment with Steelpan, and Tassa. Several dance performaces combined Tap dance, Urban dance, Hip-hop dance, Bharatanatyam, Waacking, and Bhangra (dance). The free family activities included tennis skills, mini-car racing, kite-making, dance lessons while Peel Art Gallery, Museum and Archives led free make-it-and-take-it crafts.

For the 150th anniversary of Canada, the festival, the outdoor concerts took place July 21–22, featured special performances from Indigenous artists and Indigenous storytelling in North America in collaboration with the Peel Aborginal Network as well as Bollywood singers Jonita Gandhi (Canadian citizen), Aakanksha Sharma (Canadian premier), and Kamal Khan (Canadian citizen) who headlined the 2017 festival, along with Kollywood singer Luksimi Sivaneswaralingam (Canadian citizen) performing in Tamil and Hindi. Jonita performed her song The Breakup Song (Ae Dil Hai Mushkil song) after winning the 2017 Mirchi Music Award, flying directly in from the 2017 International Indian Film Academy Awards. This was the Canadian premier for Aakanksha Sharma, who was twice nominated at the 2017 Mirchi Music Awards. Premier of Ontario Kathleen Wynne and Ontario Minister of Finance Charles Sousa provided congratulatory messages. The festival also included a comedy night, spoken word and urban music night in Brampton.

In 2018, #BollywoodMonster Mashup was headlined by singer Aaman Trikha and singer/actor Khushboo Grewal. This was Khushboo Grewal's premier Canadian performance. On-site contests gave 20 people a special meet & greet and photo opp with Aaman Trikha. The #BollywoodMonster Orchestra performed mashups of Western 80s hits x Bollywood hits. The July 21–22 event also featured performances from The Shiamak Showkids, The Giggle Queens, Himanshu and over 200 artists and 300 volunteers. The event featured a designated KidZone and ChefZone, amongst other family-friendly activities. VIPs in attendance included MP Sven Spengemann, Vikas Kohli, Mayor Bonnie Crombie, Councillor Ron Starr, Councillor John Kovac.

Headlining the 2019 festival was Yasser Desai on July 20 and Nikhita Gandhi on July 19; other acts included Parichay, Shiamak Show Kids, The Band Destiny and more. The festival launch party took place July 18 with a comedy event including Salma Hindy and Jennifer Hsiung from CP24, as well as a Silent disco and meet & greet with the headliners. The 2 outdoor days on July 19–20 included dozens of food, shopping, Bollywood dance lessons, and a KidZone.

=== 2020 - 2021: Virtual Editions ===
Due to the COVID-19 Pandemic, in 2020, #BollywoodMonster Mashup was held as a virtual event: #StayHome with #BollywoodMonster Mashup. Headlining the festival were Sunny Leone, Arjuna Harjai and the Meet Bros ft. Khushboo Grewal etc. Indo-Caribbean acts included N2 The Band, Devin Ramoutar and dance acts included BollyHeelsTO, and more. Other festivities included a KidzHour and a Q&A featuring TVOKids Dino Dana's Dad, portrayed by actor Amish Patel.

The COVID-19 Pandemic led to 2021 being another virtual year for #BollywoodMonster Mashup. Headliners included Javed Ali, Harshdeep Kaur, Raftaar performing with Deep Kalsi, Yuna, and Rashmeet Kaur as well as Canada's Drag Race winner Priyanka (drag queen). The six day event included festivities like the #BollywoodMonster Kidzone as well as a Q&A with Akash Vukoti.

=== Return to In-Person ===
==== 2022 ====
On August 5 and 6, 2022, #BollywoodMonster Mashup returned to in-person. The outdoor festival featured headliners Sunny Leone, Aaman Trikha, and Aakanksha Sharma. Other acts included Team NRITYA, DDA Canada, Reign Yash Dance Academy and more. Attendees also had access to dozens of food and clothing vendors as well as free youth and senior arts workshops. The #BollywoodMonster Orchestra performed mashups of Bollywood x Disco. The festival kicked off with six days of virtual events from July 25-30 featuring exclusive interviews from past headliners Nikhita Gandhi, Ash King, Aishwarya Nigam, and Sanchari Bose as well as exclusive performances from Jonita Gandhi, Aakanksha Sharma, Abhilasha Chellam, and Parvaaz (band). Mashup performances included Irish x Punjabi by The Snake Charmer, Bollywood x Funk by Penn Masala, and Drag x Rap by Petter Wallenberg & Rainbow Riots.

==== 2023 ====
The festival took place on Friday July 21 and Saturday July 22 with a dual emphasis between the live concerts and meet & greets from Bollywood singers Ash King, Shashaa Tirupati and Aishwarya Pandit and the growing food festival featuring street food from Northwest India/Pakistan, Northeast India/Nepal, South India/Sri Lanka, and fusion dishes such as Mexican x Indian Tacos and butter chicken momos. The original #BollywoodMonster Orchestra by Vikas Kohli, Ev Harris and Antonia Cambre will perform mashups of 80s western music x 80s Bollywood hits. GO Transit highlighted free travel for kids and transit routes via the Square One bus terminal. The #BollywoodMonster KidZone included inflatables and various free crafts. Kids got free freezies on Saturday afternoon. The #BollywoodMonster Seniors Lounge included card playing.

==== 2024 ====
On Friday, July 26 featured a special 3-hour concert from Kavita Krishnamurthy with Dr L. Subramaniam, and Saturday July 27 featured a concert from Yasser Desai. The #BollywoodMonster Orchestra performed psychedelic mashups such as “Hari Om Hari” from the film Pyaara Dushman x “Venus” by Bananarama. Attendees on Saturday afternoon could win a grand prize of $1000.

==== 2025: 15th Anniversary ====
On Friday, July 25 and Saturday, July 26 the concerts with laser show featured Bollywood singer Jyotica Tangri and Indian Idol finalist Nirali Fozdar. The #BollywoodMonster Orchestra performed Bollywood x Caribbean mashups. The festival had free entry and free parking, and the family programming included free arts workshops, free sports activities, and free seniors lounge. The food festival portion featured halal, vegetarian and gluten-free options from . The VIP event was attended by Jyotica Tangri, Nirali Fozdar, Vikas Kohli, MPP Nina Tangri, MPP Rudy Cuzzetto, MPP Deepak Anand, Councilor Kovac, and Ontario Arts Council board and staff.

==== 2026 Announced ====
The outdoor festival is expanding to three days: Friday, July 24, Saturday, July 25 and Sunday, July 26. The concerts will feature Neeraj Shridhar, Jolly Mukherjee and Priyanka Mitra. The food festival will have momos, pav bhaji, shawarma, mango lassi, etc. as well as eating contests and shopping. The family programming includes SuperDogs, Bollywood-themed selfie stations, free kids activities, and a free seniors area.
