= DJ JoN-E =

Canadian DJ, producer, writer, and radio host

Johney Brar (DJ JoN-E)
- Also known as: DJ JoN-E, Johnny No Best
- Origin: Toronto, Ontario, Canada
- Genres: Mashup, Remix, Bhangra, Indian Fusion, Hip Hop, Top 40, Retro
- Occupations: Radio Personality, DJ, Writer
- Years active: 2000-2016
- Website: www.bbcsoundcrew.com

Johney Brar (born July 25 in Toronto, Ontario), also known as DJ JoN-E or “Johnny No Best”, is a Canadian media personality, writer, and business executive. He is best known for his work as a radio host and executive producer, including his role with the Desi Live Radio Program.

His broadcasting career includes serving as the creator, host, and executive producer of the Desi Live Radio Program, a Canadian college radio program that originated on CHRY 105.5FM at York University in Toronto. The program became notable for its national distribution in the United States through HD Radio, making it the first and only Canadian college radio program to receive a national distribution deal in the U.S.

== Career ==
=== BBC Soundcrew ===
Johney Brar (DJ JoN-E/Johnny No Best) & Gurjit Bolina (MC LoudMouTH) created the South entertainment company BBC Soundcrew in the year 2001 to help develop the North American Indian/South Asian Music scene. BBC Soundcrew was developed to change, broaden and strengthen the Desi/South Asian Night Life in Canada.

Based in Toronto, Ontario, Canada, BBC Soundcrew has made their mark in the 2000s with their own ventures including popular Desi/South Asian DJ Website in Canada (BBCsoundcrew.com), BBC Soundcrew Gear, mix CDs and remix albums, a record label (Funky Dhol Productions) and a weekly primetime urban Indian/Desi radio program in North America (Desi Live on 105.5 FM Mondays 8-9PM). The show was then nationally distributed in the United States on HD radio to five major markets from 2008 to 2011.

BBC Soundcrew's night life scene saw them open for such popular South-Asian musical acts as Punjabi MC, DCS (Shin), B21, Sukhsinder Shinda, Lehmber Hussinpuri, Jassi Sidhu, RDB, Premi Group, Bikram Singh, Apache Indian, H-Dhami and others.

=== FM Radio ===
BBC Soundcrew's "Desi Live" Radio Program was hosted By Johney Brar (DJ JoN-E) and aired every Monday 8:00pm–9:00pm (EST) on CHRY 105.5FM Toronto. Shows could also be listened to on their website as well as Rogers Cable Channel 945.

It hit the airwaves in December 2004 after the green light was given from the Board of Directors of CHRY Radio Station. After the approval, "Desi Live" was given a prime time Monday night slot (8-9pm EST) to help add some diversity to the Monday night lineup on CHRY 105.5FM.

Desi Live Radio Show was sandwiched between the popular hip hop program "Backroad Radio" 6:00pm–8:00pm and "Everyday I have the Blues" the long running jazz/blues show hosted by Vince Vitacco (9:00pm–11:00pm)

The show primarily played bhangra (Punjabi) music along with urban Indian beats and music from local talent.

The show took great strides in its first year with its popularity soaring. Each show was also made available online. CL Magazine stated:

BBC Soundcrew, one of Toronto’s top Indian and Bhangra DJs, has sought to create a presence and medium for South Asians to explore their culture, not only in Toronto, but for Canada’s diverse Indian population.

"Desi Live" was considered the top Urban Bhangra Radio Program in North America. With visitors dropping by the studio every week and segments such as "The Old Skool Track of the Week, Top 5, Featured Album, Use it or Lose it (The audience decides if a new debut track should be kept in rotation on the show), and artist interviews.

Johney Brar announced in October 2008, that he will be leaving CHRY 105.5FM permanently at the end of the month, concluding his four years of programming on CHRY on October 27, 2008.

=== HD Radio ===
Johney Brar signed a deal to move his show to the United States market with a national distribution deal with HD Radio provider WorldBand Media (in partnership with Emmis Communications) beginning in late November 2008.

The shows title remained "Desi Live," however the show expanded from a 1-hour format to a 2-hour format. Desi Live also began airing live programming 5 nights a week, airing weeknights 8 pm – 10 pm on HumDesi Radio (a division of Worldband Media) hosted by Johney Brar (DJ JoN-E).

The show aired in the following cities:

New York City/New Jersey - WRKS 98.7 FM HD-2
Los Angeles - KPWR 105.9 FM HD-2
Chicago - WKQX 101.1 FM HD-2
Washington - WTOP 103.5 FM HD-2
San Jose - KIOI 101.3 FM HD-2

This was the first attempt to nationally distribute a Desi/Bhangra Show in North America, making Johney Brar the youngest nationally syndicated South-Asian DJ in North America.

As of October 2009, Desi Live changed timeslots from 8 pm – 10 pm weeknights to its new home 9 pm – 12 am Fridays and Saturdays.

As of July 2010, Desi Live began airing one night a week, Saturdays 9 pm – midnight.

The last show for Humdesi Radio aired on May 21, 2011. Humdesi Radio was sold shortly after this, officially cancelling all shows on its network.

=== Desi Live TV ===
In 2015, concepts were pitched to two prominent Canadian television networks of turning the radio show in to a live dance music television program, appealing to ethnic music audiences around the country. While the idea gained interest from the networks, it was put on hold by Johney claiming that certain rules and restrictions of what we can do on the program by the networks would likely make the show unprofitable. Due to this, the pilot episode of "Desi Live TV" was never shot.

=== Executive Producer - Radio ===
Johney Brar has created or assisted in development the following radio programs:

| Debut Year | Station | Show Title | Timeslot | Role |
|---|---|---|---|---|
| 2004 | CHRY 105.5FM | Desi Live | Mondays 8 pm – 9 pm | Executive Producer & Host |
| 2008 | HumDesi (HD Radio) | Desi Live USA | Weeknights 8 pm – 10 pm | Executive Producer & Host |
| 2009 | HumDesi (HD Radio) | Bollywood 360 | Weeknights 12 am – 2 am | Executive Producer |
| 2009 | HumDesi (HD Radio) | Top 10 | Weeknights 7 pm – 8 pm | Co-Executive Producer |
| 2009 | HumDesi (HD Radio) | Apna Ave | Weeknights 10 pm – 11 pm | Executive Producer |
| 2009 | HumDesi (HD Radio) | Divine Sounds | Weekdays 4 am – 6 am | Executive Producer |
| 2009 | HumDesi (HD Radio) | Chutney Flava | Weekends 11 pm – 12 pm | Co-Executive Producer |
| 2009 | HumDesi (HD Radio) | Chak Dey USA | Weeknights 2 am – 4 am | Executive Producer |

=== Notable Guests ===
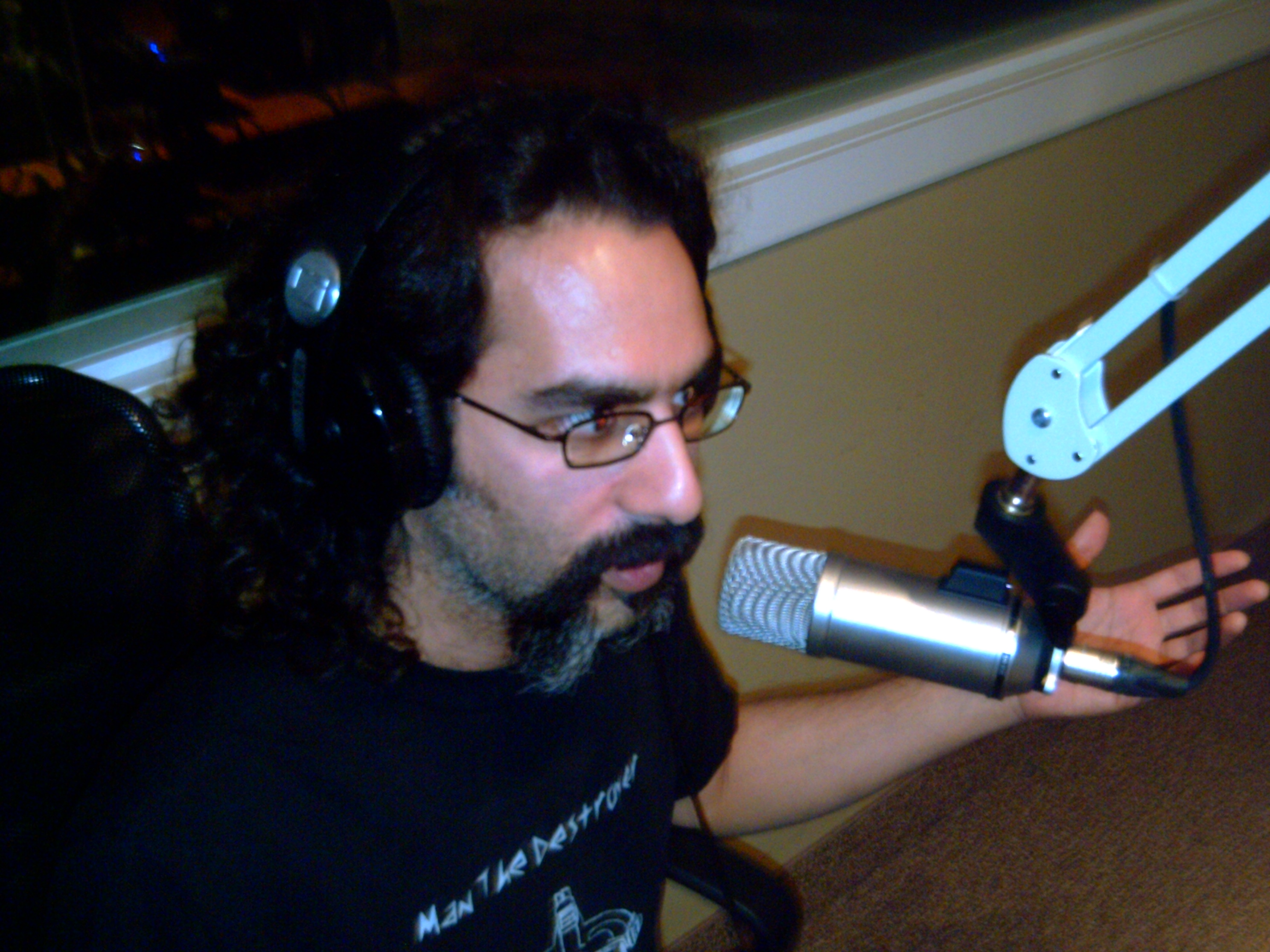
Vikas Kohli being interviewed on the Desi Live radio show.

Trish Stratus - WWE Hall of Famer

Shaun Majumder - Canadian comedian/actor

Vikas Kohli - Audio Producer of Fatlabs recording studio in Mississauga, Ontario, Canada

Lara Levi - CEO of Death Row Records

Sonjay Dutt - Professional Wrestler

John Leguizamo - Emmy Award-winning actor

== Discography ==
BBC Soundcrew - Live to Air (2002)

BBC Soundcrew - BreakThrough (2003)

Various - Urban Bhangra (BBC Soundcrew (DJ JoN-E) - Sound Rab Di)

BBC Soundcrew (DJ JoN-E) - Got Yourself Desi Remixxx Feat Nas (2004)

BBC Soundcrew (DJ JoN-E) - Desi Live the Mixx CD Vol. 1 (March - 2005)

BBC Soundcrew - Punjabi MC VS Eminem Mashup (Single 2005) (Produced By DJ Din)

BBC Soundcrew (DJ JoN-E & DJ Davy) - Desi Live the Mixx CD Vol. 2 (March - 2008)
