= Rajdeep Chatterjee =

Indian playback singer

- Born: 17 June 1991 (age 35); Jamshedpur Jharkhand, India
- Genre: Playback singing
- Occupation: Singer
- Years active: 2011–present

Rajdeep Chatterjee is an Indian playback singer and musician from Jamshedpur in the Indian state of Jharkhand. He participated in the Indian music shows Sa Re Ga Ma Pa L'il Champs, Indian Idol 4 and Sitaron Ko Choona Hai.

== Early life ==
Chatterjee was interested in music from age two and studied under Pandit Shri Chandrakant Apte. He graduated with a degree in Indian classical music. He was top Finalist of Zee TV music show Sa Re Ga Ma Pa L'il Champs in 2006. Rajdeep ranked fourth in 2008 on Indian Idol. He was declared one of the best singers of all four seasons of the show by judges Anu Malik, Javed Akhtar, Kailash Kher and Sonali Bendre.

He was declared as the "Jharkhand Icon" by the Symbiosis group along with Film director Imtiaz Ali.

He recorded a song for AR Rahman in his studio for his show in Germany and a song for a Tamil film with Shreya Ghoshal.

Rajdeep's first ever Bollywood playback is in the movie Bodyguard, where he is part of the team of "Band of Powers" who sang the title track of that movie. Recently he sang the title track for Akshay Kumar's newest release, Khiladi 786 he voiced music the action movies Policegiri and Gunday. He has performed more than 200 shows in India as well as abroad. Rajdeep's first ever performance in Canada was at the Bollywood Monster Mashup in 2012. At this performance, he led the entire crows on a sing along tribute to Indian actor Rajesh Khanna, who passed away weeks before the show, while Vikas Kohli accompanied him on the acoustic guitar.

== Reality shows ==
| Year | Show | Role | Channel | Note |
|---|---|---|---|---|
| 2006 | Sa Re Ga Ma Pa L'il Champs | contestant | Zee TV | Eliminated |
| 2008–2009 | Indian Idol 4 | contestant | Sony TV | Eliminated |
| 2012 | Jo Jeeta Wohi Super Star 2 | contestant | STAR Plus | Eliminated |

== Discography ==
| Year | Film | Song name(s) | Co-singer(s) | Music director(s) |
|---|---|---|---|---|
| 2012 | Khiladi 786 | "Khiladi (Title Track)", "Khiladi – Remix" | Vinit Singh, Aman Trikha, Alamgir Khan, Yashraj Kapil | Himesh Reshammiya |
| 2013 | Policegiri | "Ab Tere Bin Jeelenge Hum" | Aman Trikha, Yashraj Kapil, Keshav | Himesh Reshammiya |
| 2013 | Gunday | "Gunday - Bangla Version" | None | |
