= Desi Live =

American radio program

- Genre: Music, Talk
- Running time: 3 hours (9 pm-12 am)
- Country of origin: United States; Canada
- Home station: New York WRKS 98.7FM HD-2; Washington WTOP 103.5FM HD-2; Chicago WKQX 101.1FM HD-2; Los Angeles KPWR 105.9FM HD-2; San Jose KIOI 101.3FM HD-2
- Executive producer(s): Johney Brar
- Original release: 2004 – 2011
- Opening theme: Desi Live Anthem
- Website: www.bbcsoundcrew.com

Desi Live Radio Program was the first nationally distributed South-Asian radio show in the United States. The show was produced and hosted by Johney Brar (DJ JoN-E of BBC Soundcrew) and distributed by HumDesi Radio Network (a division of WorldBand Media) in HD Radio format. The program first aired on CHRY 105.5FM then moved in 2008 to HD Radio airing in New York City/New Jersey - WRKS 98.7 FM HD-2, Los Angeles - KPWR 105.9 FM HD-2, Chicago - WKQX 101.1 FM HD-2, San Jose/Bay Area - KIOI 101.3 FM HD-2 and Washington - WTOP 103.5 FM HD-2.

== FM Radio ==
BBC Soundcrew's "Desi Live" Radio Program was hosted By Johney Brar (DJ JoN-E) and aired every Monday 8:00pm–9:00pm (EST) on CHRY 105.5FM Toronto. Shows could also be listened to on their website as well as Rogers Cable Channel 945.

BBC Soundcrew's "Desi Live" Radio Program hit the airwaves in December 2004 after the green light was given from the Board of Directors of CHRY Radio Station. After the approval, "Desi Live" was given a prime time Monday night slot (8-9pm EST) to help add some diversity to the Monday night lineup on CHRY 105.5FM.

Desi Live Radio Show was sandwiched between the popular hip hop program "Backroad Radio" 6:00pm–8:00pm and "Everyday I have the Blues" the long running jazz/blues show hosted by Vince Vitacco (9:00pm–11:00pm)

The show primarily played bhangra (Punjabi) music along with urban Indian beats and music from local talent.

The show took great strides in its first year with its popularity soaring. Each show was also made available online at bbcsoundcrew.com so listeners can listen anytime as even the old shows were archived.

“BBC Soundcrew, one of Toronto’s top Indian and Bhangra DJs, has sought to create a presence and medium for South Asians to explore their culture, not only in Toronto, but for Canada’s diverse Indian population."

"Desi Live" was produced and hosted by BBC Soundcrew"s Johney Brar (DJ JoN-E) and was considered the #1 Urban Bhangra Radio Program in North America. With visitors dropping by the studio every week and segments such as "The Old Skool Track of the Week, Top 5, Featured Album, Use it or Lose it (The audience decides if a new debut track should be kept in rotation on the show), and artist interviews.

Johney Brar announced in October 2008, that he will be leaving CHRY 105.5FM permanently at the end of the month, concluding his four years of programming at the network on October 27, 2008.

== HD Radio ==
Johney Brar signed a deal to move his show to the United States market with a national syndication deal with HD Radio provider WorldBand Media (in partnership with Emmis Communications, beginning in late November 2008.

The shows title remained "Desi Live," however the show expanded from a 1-hour format to a 2-hour format. Desi Live also began airing live programming 5 nights a week, airing weeknights 8:00pm–10:00pm on HumDesi Radio (HD Radio) hosted by Johney Brar (DJ JoN-E).

The show aired in the following cities:

New York City/New Jersey - WRKS 98.7 FM HD-2
Los Angeles - KPWR 105.9 FM HD-2
Chicago - WKQX 101.1 FM HD-2
Washington - WTOP 103.5 FM HD-2
San Jose - KIOI 101.3 FM HD-2

This was the first attempt to nationally syndicate a Desi/Bhangra Show in North America, making Johney Brar the youngest nationally syndicated South-Asian DJ in North America.

As of October 2009, Desi Live changed timeslots from 8:00pm–10:00pm weeknights to its new home 9:00pm–12:00am Friday's and Saturday's.

As of July 2010, Desi Live began airing one night a week, Saturdays 9:00pm - Midnight.

The last show for Humdesi Radio aired on May 21, 2011. Humdesi Radio was sold shortly after this, officially cancelling all shows on its network.

== Desi Live TV ==
In 2015, concepts were pitched to two prominent Canadian television networks of turning the radio show in to a live dance music television program, appealing to ethnic music audiences around the country. While the idea gained interest from the networks, it was put on hold by Johney claiming that certain rules and restrictions of what we can do on the program by the networks would likely make the show unprofitable. Due to this, the pilot episode of "Desi Live TV" was never shot.

== Notable Guests ==
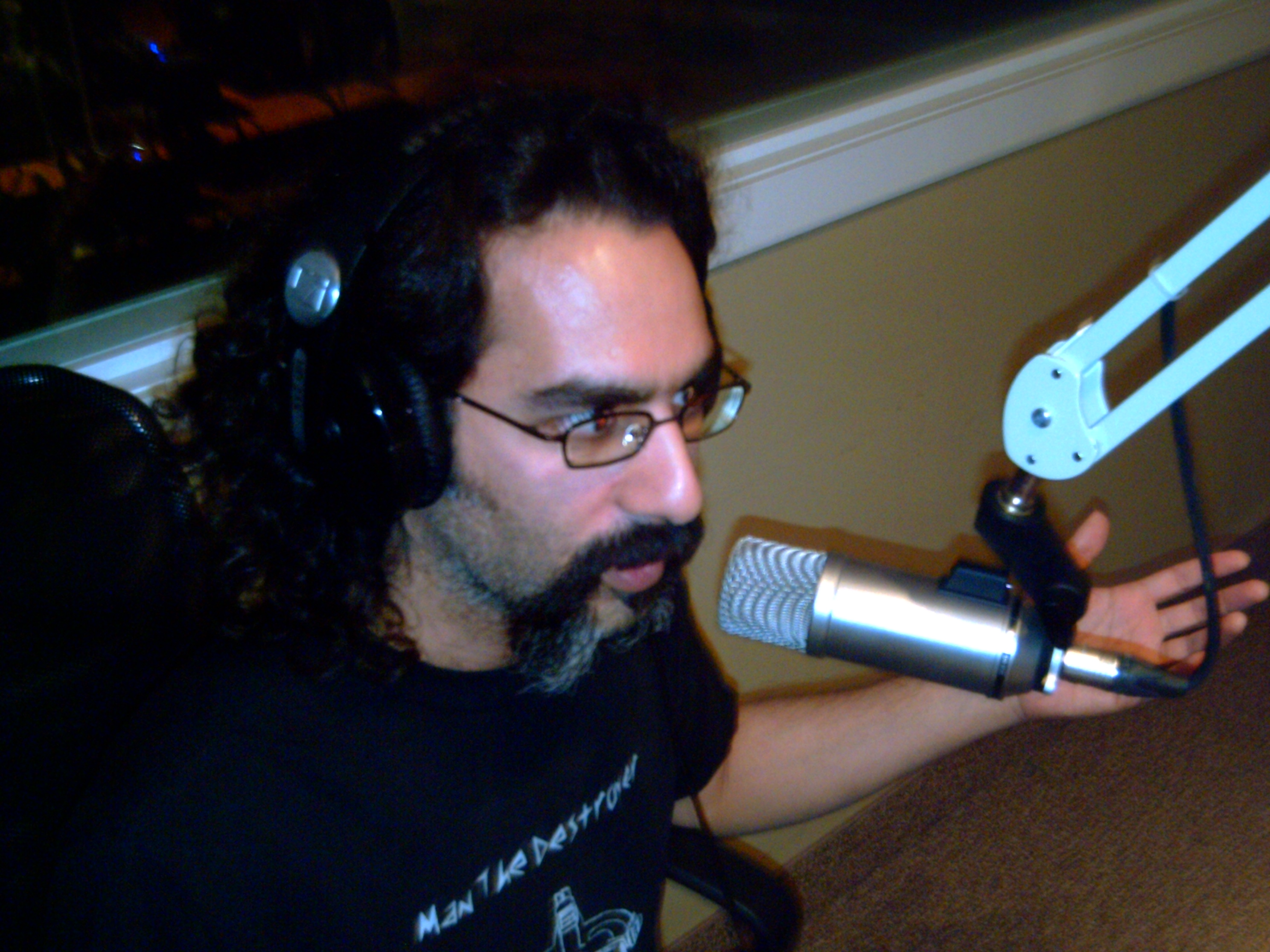
Vikas Kohli being interviewed on the Desi Live radio show.

Trish Stratus - WWE Hall of Famer

Shaun Majumder - Canadian comedian/actor

Vikas Kohli - Audio Producer of Fatlabs recording studio in Mississauga, Ontario, Canada

Lara Levi - CEO of Death Row Records

Sonjay Dutt - Professional Wrestler

John Leguizamo - Emmy Award winning actor
