= Prem Ratan Dhan Payo (soundtrack) =

Soundtrack album by Himesh Reshammiya
- Released: 10 October 2015
- Recorded: HR Musik Studio
- Genre: Feature film soundtrack
- Length: 39:12 (Audio Jukebox)
- Language: Hindi
- Label: T-Series
- Producer: Himesh Reshammiya

Himesh Reshammiya chronology
All Is Well (2015)	Prem Ratan Dhan Payo (2015)	Sanam Teri Kasam (2016)

Singles from Prem Ratan Dhan Payo
- 1. "Prem Leela" Released: 7 October 2015

Prem Ratan Dhan Payo is the soundtrack to the 2015 film of the same name, written and directed by Sooraj Barjatya. Produced by Rajshri Productions, it stars Salman Khan and Sonam Kapoor in the lead role. The soundtrack features 10 songs, curated by Himesh Reshammiya and written by Irshad Kamil. While Sanjoy Chowdhury composed the original background score for the film.

T-Series acquired the music rights of the film at a cost of ₹17 crore (US$1.8 million), which was the biggest music deal for any Bollywood film till that date.

The first song "Prem Leela" was released as a single on 7 October 2015. The full music album of Prem Ratan Dhan Payo was released on 10 October 2015.

== Development ==
Initially, the director Sooraj Barjatya wanted to rope in Ravindra Jain or any of the conventional music composers. However Salman Khan recommended Himesh Reshammiya to Barjatya to compose songs for the film as he believed that both Reshammiya and Barjatya would bond on their similar style of working.

"Sooraj was very particular about the kind of music he wanted for the film. The prerequisite was to find a composer who has the patience to create an elaborate album like PRDP. His and Himesh Reshammiya’s sensibilities matched as they both like to take time on each song and work on its detailing. Sooraj’s only brief to Himesh Reshammiya was to avoid any kind of electronic music. He wanted old-world music and humble songs."

— Salman Khan

Once all the songs were finalised, Barjatya was also present for the final recordings of even chorus singers as he wanted the chorus singers’ rendition to be in sync with the junior artistes.

== Track listing ==
All lyrics are written by Irshad Kamil; all music is composed by Himesh Reshammiya.

No.	Title	Singer(s)	Length
1.	"Prem Leela"	Aman Trikha, Vinit Singh	03:41
2.	"Prem Ratan Dhan Payo"	Palak Muchhal	05:19
3.	"Jalte Diye"	Anweshaa, Harshdeep Kaur, Vinit Singh, Shabab Sabri	05:36
4.	"Aaj Unse Milna Hai"	Shaan	04:03
5.	"Jab Tum Chaho"	Palak Muchhal, Mohammed Irfan, Darshan Raval	05:07
6.	"Halo Re"	Aman Trikha	03:18
7.	"Tod Tadaiyya"	Neeraj Shridhar, Neeti Mohan	04:24
8.	"Bachpan Kahan?"	Himesh Reshammiya	04:02
9.	"Murli Ki Taanon Si"	Shaan	01:29
10.	"Aaj Unse Kehna Hai"	Aishwarya Majmudar, Palak Muchhal, Shaan	02:08
Total length:			39:31

== Personnel ==
- Music Composer: Himesh Reshammiya
- Background score: Sanjoy Chowdhury
- Lyrics: Irshad Kamil
- Playback artists: Aman Trikha, Vinit Singh, Palak Muchhal, Anweshaa, Harshdeep Kaur, Shabab Sabri, Shaan, Mohammed Irfan, Darshan Raval, Neeraj Shridhar, Neeti Mohan, Aishwarya Majumdar and Himesh Reshammiya
- Music Programmers: Suhas Parab, Subhash Parab, Priyesh Vakil
- Guitarist: Vivek Verma
- Sound Engineers: Salman Shaikh, Sakar Apte and Anudutt Shamain at HR Musik Studio
- Mixed and Mastered by: Salman Shaikh at HR Musik Studio

== Critical response ==
Critic Aelina Kapoor of Rediff.com gave the album 3.5 stars out of 5, saying that "the music of 'Prem Ratan Dhan Payo' is well done, has a strong traditional flavour, have a paarivaarik feel and is exactly what the filmmaker ordered." Joginder Tuteja of Bollywood Hungama gave the album a score 4.5 out of 5 and stated that Himesh Reshammiya has delivered his "best ever in his musical career" and "the soundtrack exceeds the massive expectations one had from it." He described the album as brilliant and praised the lyrics by Irshad Kamil.

Kasmin Fernandes of The Times of India gave the album 4/5 and complimented that "music of the film is pleasant and is reminiscent of jubilant songs from the 1990s." She however, adored the lyrics by Irshad Kamil. Critic R. M. Vijayakar in his review for India-West assigned a score of 3.5 out of 5 to the soundtrack. He summarised that "the score deserves 'hosannas' for its courage and conviction in delivering deep and rich Indian melody, good poetry and thematic veracity against today's depraved trends." He also pointed that the album is a pure one, without any "crass words, western beats, rap, and multiple music makers!"

In his critical review for The New Indian Express, Vipin Nair awards the album a score of 6.5 out of 10. He stated that the album might "be a hit with the people who love 90s Bollywood melodies." However, he also pointed that it is a bit dated.

== Awards and accolades ==
BIG Star Entertainment Awards
Year	Category	Nominee	Result
2015	Most Entertaining Music	Himesh Reshammiya	Won
2015	Most Entertaining Song (Prem Ratan Dhan Payo)	Himesh Reshammiya	Nominated
2015	Most Entertaining Singer (Female)	Palak Muchhal	Won
Stardust Awards
Year	Category	Nominee	Result
2016	Best Singer Female	Palak Muchhal	Won
Filmfare Awards
Year	Category	Nominee	Result
2016	Best Singer – Female	Palak Muchhal	Nominated
Zee Cine Awards
Year	Category	Nominee	Result
2016	Best Song of the Year	Himesh Reshammiya	Won
