= From Under the Bleachers =

Album by Zameer Rizvi

From Under The Bleachers

Studio album by Zameer
- Released: October 30, 2011 (Canada)
- Recorded: 2007–2009
- Genre: Pop, singer/songwriter
- Label: Rizvi Records
- Producer: Steve Thompson; Vikas Kohli (Fatlabs); Reuben Ghose

Zameer chronology
Saath	From Under The Bleachers	Live in Los Angeles

From Under the Bleachers is the debut album from singer/songwriter Zameer.

== Track listing ==
#	Title	Time
1	"With You"	3:42
2	"First Love"	2:48
3	"Glory of Love"	3:43
4	"My Hometown"	3:11
5	"Win or Defeat"	4:05
6	"Mind Over Murder"	3:20
7	"You Lied To Me"	3:28
8	"Lady Bug"	3:29
9	"Burn My Bridges"	3:31
10	"Where The Sun Don't Shine"	3:12
11	"Queen of Diamonds"	3:42
12	"Final Conversation"	3:47

== Singles ==
Year	Single	Chart positions		Album
Year	Single	Billboard Hot 100 (CAN)	Billboard Artists (CAN)	Album
2011	"Glory of Love"	73	5	From Under The Bleachers

== Music videos ==
Zameer has released 4 music videos for From Under The Bleachers:

Year	Single	Director	Album
2008	'Win or Defeat'	Marc André Debruyne	From Under The Bleachers
2009	'With You' on YouTube	Nelson Navarro Navarro	From Under The Bleachers
2010	'My Hometown' on YouTube	Mark Araujo	From Under The Bleachers
2011	'Mind Over Murder' on YouTube	Randall Lobb	From Under The Bleachers
