= BBC Soundcrew =

- BBC Soundcrew Logo

Background information
- Also known as: The Original Desi Soundcrew
- Origin: Toronto, ON, Canada
- Genres: Bhangra, Asian Fusion, Top 40, Hip hop
- Occupations: DJ, Radio Show Hosts
- Years active: 2000-2016
- Label: Sixcity Media Group
- Members: DJ Johnny No Best; MC LoudMouTh; DJ Davy
- Website: BBCsoundcrew.com

BBC Soundcrew is a Canadian DJ group from Toronto, Ontario, Canada. Created in 2000 by Johney Brar (DJ JoN-E) and Gurjit Bolina (MC LoudMouTH) BBC Soundcrew was created to advance the South-Asian music scene across North America.

BBC Soundcrew has made their mark with their own ventures including the Top South-Asian DJ Website in Canada (BBCsoundcrew.com), nightclub residency, BBC Soundcrew Gear, mix CDs and remix albums and a weekly prime-time urban South-Asian radio program (Desi Live on 105.5 FM Hosted By DJ JoN-E) which was the first South-Asian radio program that gained national distribution in the United States as of December 2008. As of 2018, BBC Soundcrew & Entertainment is now a division of Sixcity Media Group.

== Nightlife ==
BBC Soundcrew broke into the music night life scene in early 2001 in the Toronto area. A few connections were made between BBC Soundcrew and local club promoters around the city. and they were invited to perform opening sets at various venues within the Greater Toronto Area. While the first few events were not well attended, it gave a chance for the team to get practice on the main stage at venues.

The company's head disc jockey DJ JoN-E was 16 years old at the time, which would make him 3 years under the admission age for most nightclubs in the province. A special wristband policy was generally implemented by venues to accommodate access for him.

The live MC portion of events was handled by Gurjit Bolina (MC LoudMouTH) as he became the first ever Sikh turbaned MC to do live nightlife events as well as have nightclub residency in North America.

== Napster & Limewire ==
BBC Soundcrew entered the industry as online music sharing was in its infancy. While mainstream music was accessible, South-Asian music was not at the time. In 2000, DJ JoN-E started to put individual bhangra mixes online which spread through the internet quickly via file sharing programs such as Napster and Limewire. The mixes that were released online became a good portion of their first remix album "Live to Air" which was also released online for free. All future albums from BBC Soundcrew were made available for free online as they did not see the value in selling it as bootlegging and audio/video duplication were already rampant in the South-Asian community.

== FM Radio ==
BBC Soundcrew's "Desi Live" Radio Program was hosted By Johney Brar (DJ JoN-E) and aired every Monday 8:00 p.m. – 9:00 p.m. (EST) on CHRY 105.5FM Toronto. Shows could also be listened to on their website as well as Rogers Cable Channel 945.

BBC Soundcrew's "Desi Live" Radio Program hit the airwaves in December 2004 after the green light was given from the Board of Directors of CHRY Radio Station. After the approval, "Desi Live" was given a prime time Monday night slot (8-9 p.m. EST) to help add some diversity to the Monday night lineup on CHRY 105.5FM.

Desi Live Radio Show was sandwiched between the popular hip hop program "Backroad Radio" 6:00 p.m. – 8:00 p.m. and "Everyday I have the Blues" the long running jazz/blues show hosted by Vince Vitacco (9:00 p.m. – 11:00 p.m.)

The show primarily played bhangra (Punjabi) music along with urban Indian beats and music from local talent.

The show took great strides in its first year with its popularity soaring. Each show was also made available online at bbcsoundcrew.com so listeners can listen anytime as even the old shows were archived.

BBC Soundcrew, one of Toronto's top Indian and Bhangra DJs, has sought to create a presence and medium for South Asians to explore their culture, not only in Toronto, but for Canada's diverse Indian population.

"Desi Live" was produced and hosted by BBC Soundcrew"s Johney Brar (DJ JoN-E) and was considered the #1 Urban Bhangra Radio Program in North America. With visitors dropping by the studio every week and segments such as "The Old Skool Track of the Week, Top 5, Featured Album, Use it or Lose it (The audience decides if a new debut track should be kept in rotation on the show), and artist interviews.

Johney Brar announced in October 2008, that he will be leaving CHRY 105.5FM permanently at the end of the month, concluding his four years of programming on CHRY on October 27, 2008.

== HD Radio ==
Johney Brar signed a deal to move his show to the United States market with a national syndication deal with HD Radio provider WorldBand Media, beginning in late November 2008.

The shows title remained "Desi Live," however the show expanded from a 1-hour format to a 2-hour format. Desi Live also began airing live programming 5 nights a week, airing weeknights 8:00 p.m. – 10:00 p.m. on HumDesi Radio (HD Radio) hosted by Johney Brar (DJ JoN-E).

The show aired in the following cities:

New York City/New Jersey - WRKS 98.7 FM HD-2
Los Angeles - KPWR 105.9 FM HD-2
Chicago - WKQX 101.1 FM HD-2
Washington - WTOP 103.5 FM HD-2
San Jose - KIOI 101.3 FM HD-2

This was the first attempt to nationally syndicate a Desi/Bhangra Show in North America, making Johney Brar the youngest nationally syndicated South-Asian DJ in North America.

As of October 2009, Desi Live changed timeslots from 8:00 p.m. – 10:00 p.m. weeknights to its new home 9:00 p.m. – 12:00 a.m. Friday's and Saturday's.

As of July 2010, Desi Live began airing one night a week, Saturday's 9:00 p.m. - Midnight.

The last show for Humdesi Radio aired on May 21, 2011. Humdesi Radio was sold shortly after this, officially cancelling all shows on its network.

== Discography ==
BBC Soundcrew (DJ JoN-E & MC LoudMouth) - Live to Air (2001)

BBC Soundcrew (DJ JoN-E) - BreakThrough (2003)

Various - Urban Bhangra (BBC Soundcrew (DJ JoN-E) - Soun Rab Di)

BBC Soundcrew (DJ JoN-E) - Got Yourself Desi Remixxx Feat Nas (2004)

BBC Soundcrew (DJ JoN-E) - Desi Live the Mixx CD Vol. 1 (March - 2005)

BBC Soundcrew - Punjabi MC VS Eminem Mashup (Single 2005) (Produced By DJ Din)

BBC Soundcrew (DJ JoN-E & DJ Davy) - Desi Live the Mixx CD Vol. 2 (March - 2008)
