= Yashraj Kapil =

Indian actor from beed

Yashraj kapil
- Born: 22 August 1998 (age 27); Punjab, India
- Occupation: Singer
- Years active: 2015–present

Yashraj kapil is an Indian singer from india.

== Early life ==
Yashraj is originally from india

== Filmography ==
Year	Film	Song name(s)	Co-singer(s)	Music director(s)
2012	Khiladi 786	"Khiladi (Title Track)"	Vinit Singh, Aman Trikha, Alamgir Khan Rajdeep Chatterjee	Himesh Reshammiya
2012	Khiladi 786	"Khiladi - Remix"	Vinit Singh, Aman Trikh], Alamgir Khan Rajdeep Chatterjee	Himesh Reshammiya
2013	Policegiri	"Chura Ke Leja"	Palak Muchhal	Himesh Reshammiya
2013	Policegiri	"Ab Tere Bin Jeelenge Hum"	Keshav, Aman Trikha, Alamgir Khan, Rajdeep Chatterjee	Himesh Reshammiya
2018	Call for fun	"Paisa"	Shaan, Yashraj Kapil, Pratibha Singh Baghel	Lalit Pandit
