= Zameer Rizvi =

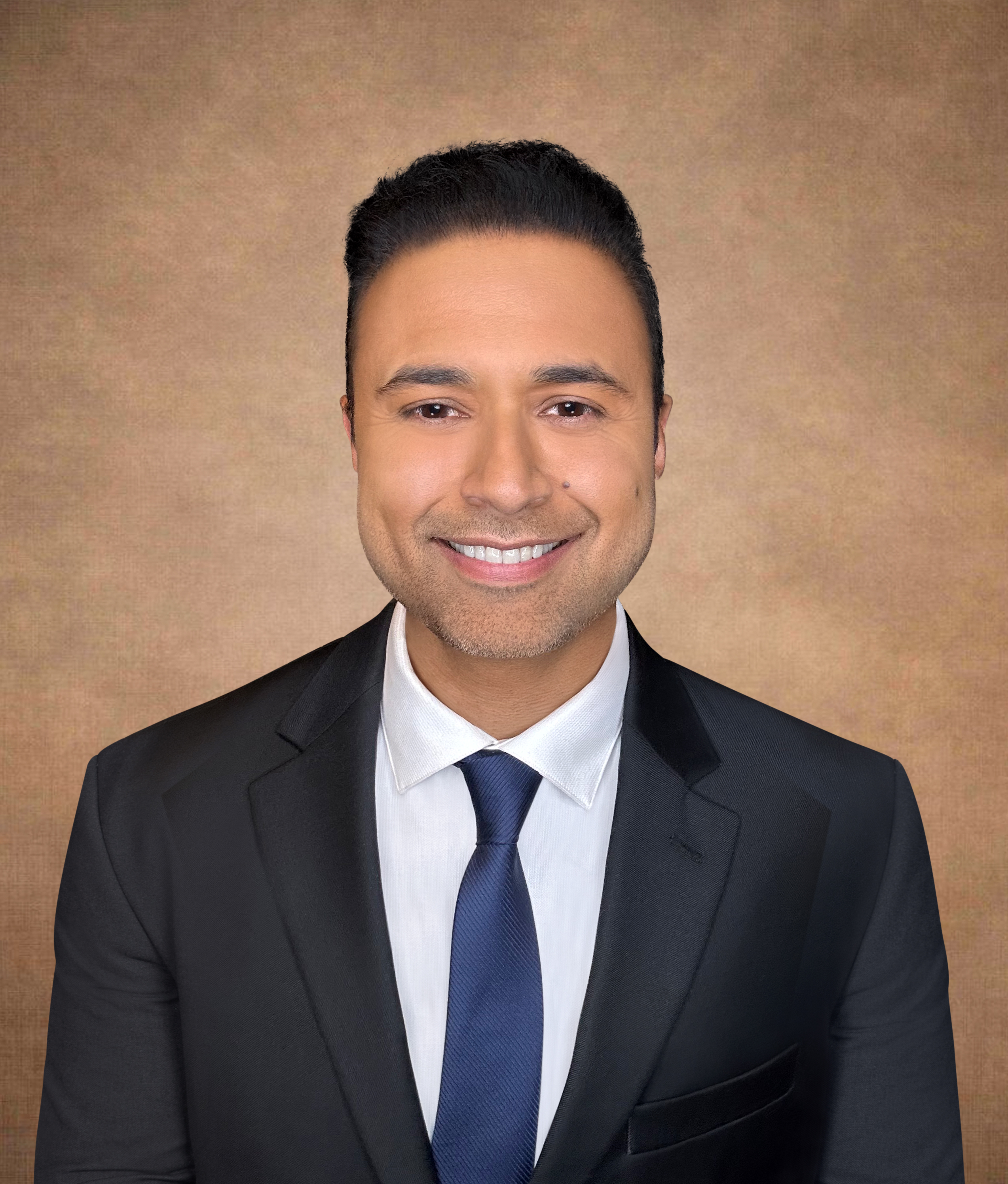
- Santa Barbara, 2023

Background information
- Born: 5 February 1981 (age 45)
- Occupation: Technology Entrepreneur
- Years active: 2002–present
- Website: odesso.com

Zameer Rizvi (born 5 February 1981) is a technology entrepreneur and innovator of AI software. Before finding success in the tech business, he pursued a music career as a singer/songwriter. He founded Odesso Inc in 2017.

== Life and career ==
=== Early life and career beginnings ===
Rizvi was born in Lahore, Pakistan. He was raised in Libya, Saudi Arabia, Pakistan, England and finally Canada. In 1995, Rizvi and his family immigrated to Canada, and currently reside in Mississauga, Ontario. Rizvi is the youngest of four siblings, who later formed their own band. In 1998, Rizvi and his two brothers, Ali and Hussain, released their first EP as the band Dead Shyre. Although it received moderate success, Rizvi credits Dead Shyre for teaching him the basics of recording and production. They also have one sister, Tara. Both of Rizvi's parents are university professors. Rizvi holds a bachelor's degree in electrical engineering from the University of Western Ontario. Zameer has travelled quite a lot which is reflected in his music.

=== 2002–2004: Electrical Engineering & Music ===
During 2002–2004, while attending the University of Western Ontario in London, Ontario, Rizvi studied the mathematical ingredients of some of this era's hit music, using auditory scene analysis. His research paper, titled "Auditory Scene Analysis of 20th Century Popular Music", was published by the Department of Electrical and Computer Engineering at the University of Western Ontario.

=== 2005–2007: "Win or Defeat" ===
In 2005, Rizvi moved back to Toronto to pursue his music career. He formed a band and performed at local Toronto open mics and bars, including Lee's Palace and the Horseshoe Tavern. Over the next two years, Rizvi steadily moved up Toronto's live music food chain, performing at bigger and better venues including the Opera House, Hershey Centre, and ultimately the Skydome (Rogers Centre).

It was around this time that Rizvi wrote and released his debut single "Win or Defeat", and was nominated as 'Best Artist' at the Toronto Independent Music Awards. He was also ranked amongst the top 10 live acts in Toronto by the world's largest music festival, Emergenza. Record labels and producers started paying attention, and Rizvi was approached by multiple Grammy Award winning producer, Steve Thompson. Steve later went on to re-produce "Win or Defeat", which Rizvi debuted for 30,000 spectators during a sporting event at the Skydome in Toronto.

=== 2008–2010: Partnering with the 2010 Vancouver Games ===
The message of "Win or Defeat" is to overcome all obstacles to pursue a dream, which resonated with the Canadian Paralympic Committee. The Committee subsequently licensed "Win or Defeat" to use as a song promoting athletes with disabilities. The Paralympics produced the video for "Win or Defeat", which featured Canadian Paralympic gold medalists Brad Bowden and Paul Rosen. Soon after the video's release, "Win or Defeat" was in rotation on MTV, MuchMusic and over 45 radio stations nationwide. Rizvi went on to perform the song at the 2010 Vancouver Games in Whistler, British Columbia.

=== 2015–2016: Her ===
Rizvi announced plans to release a new album called "Her" during a 19 January interview on Open Chest TV with Raj Girn, part of the Anokhi Magazine network. Rizvi revealed he has been working with drummer Johnny Fay of The Tragically Hip and 13-time Juno winning producer Gavin Brown (musician). Rizvi's first single "Crazy" ft. Mia Martina came out on 28 April. It debuted at No. 5 breakout on the Billboard Hot Dance Club charts on 18 July 2015. It spent 6 weeks in the top 50, peaking at No. 42. On 30 June 2016 Zameer released the album Her while on tour with Ali Noor as his guest guitarist.

=== 2017: Digital Summer ===
Zameer started off 2016 with the release of the song and music video "Oh Yea!". In July 2016 Zameer went on tour to promote his album Her. During the course of the tour Zameer live streamed several sessions of him and Ali Noor working on new music. In early 2017 Zameer teased a song and music video entitled "Walk Away" which was later revealed to be the song they worked on while on tour in 2016. After teasing "Walk Away" several music videos released which included "Endless Summer" and "Uh Oh". On 28 July 2017 Zameer released the album Digital Summer which featured "Walk Away", all the songs from the recent music videos, and B-sides and EDM remixes from the Her recording sessions. In November 2017 Zameer released the music video for "Walk Away".

=== 2018: Nomad ===
On 30 November 2018 Zameer released his 4th studio album Nomad which featured the singles "Hope", "Don't Stop Movin (feat. Lily Kincade)", and "Origin (feat. Holly Pyle)", along with 8 more previously unreleased tracks. One of the new songs "Who's to Say" was previewed previously during live acoustic performances and live streams on social media, but wasn't produced and mastered until its debut on Nomad. This album was fully produced and orchestrated by Zameer Rizvi. While most of the album is carried by Zameer's vocals and guitar performances, he also tapped several other instrumentalists including string musicians from the LA philharmonic and a trumpeter who has played on multiple Grammy winning and Billboard No. 1 albums.

=== 2021: Automation Technology ===
Zameer founded and became the CEO of Odesso, a tech startup that builds software automation solutions used by the Food and Drug Administration (FDA) and the U.S. Department of Justice (DOJ)

=== 2023: Odesso Health and Clinical Data Connector ===
In November 2023, Odesso Health introduced its Clinical Data Connector (CDC) to the athenahealth Marketplace and the Appian Community AppMarket, as Odesso Health continues efforts to utilize Artificial Intelligence (AI) for the automation of Electronic Medical Records (EMR) workflows, to expand their solutions to a wider audience within the healthcare sector.

== Music Discography ==
=== Albums ===
- From Under the Bleachers (2010)
- Her (2016)
- Digital Summer (2017)
- Nomad (2018)

=== Chart positions ===
Year	Artist	Album	Song	Peak Chart Positions					
Year	Artist	Album	Song	Billboard Canadian Hot 100	Billboard Hot Dance Club (US)	Billboard Artists ( CAN)	Billboard Social Media (US)	Canadian iTunes Sales	Billboard Digital Sales
2011	Zameer	From Under the Bleachers	"Glory of Love"	73	–	5	–	–	–
2012	Zameer	From Under the Bleachers	–	–	–	–	1	–	–
2015	Zameer Rizvi	Her	"Crazy (feat. Mia Martina)"	–	42	–	–	–	–
2018	Zameer Rizvi	Nomad	"Don't Stop Movin"	–	–	–	–	50	–
2019	Zameer Rizvi	Nomad	"Hope"	–	–	–	–	18	33

=== Music videos ===
Rizvi has released fourteen music videos to date:

Year	Single	Director	Album
2008	"Win or Defeat"	Marc André Debruyne	From Under the Bleachers
2009	"With You"	Nelson Navarro Navarro	From Under the Bleachers
2010	"Teri Yaad"	Isaac Elliott-Fisher, Awais Jaffery	Saath
2010	"My Hometown"	Mark Araujo	From Under the Bleachers
2010	"Classical Jind Mahi"	Isaac Elliott-Fisher	Saath
2011	"Mind Over Murder"	Randall Lobb	From Under the Bleachers
2012	"Tatti"	Awais Jaffery, Isaac Elliott-Fisher	TBA
2014	"Shut The World Out"	Ali Noor, Isaac Elliott-Fisher	Her
2015	"Crazy"	Sloane Berry	Her
2016	"Take"	Mandana Zaidi	Her
2017	"Oh Yea!"	Nicholas Jurand	Digital Summer
2017	"Endless Summer"	Nicholas Jurand	Digital Summer
2017	"Uh Oh"	Nicholas Jurand	Digital Summer
2017	"Walk Away"	Nicholas Jurand	Digital Summer
2018	"Shalalalalalala"	Nicholas Jurand	Digital Summer
2019	"Hope"	Nicholas Jurand	Nomad

== Other work ==
In 2006, Rizvi founded his own imprint called Rizvi Records through which he releases his music. He also founded ZRG, a provider of communications and technology consulting services to a client roster which includes Bell Canada and Research in Motion.

Rizvi is a multi-instrumentalist and plays the guitars, drums, and keyboards on most of the songs on From Under the Bleachers.

== Charity work ==
Rizvi has founded several charitable initiatives for various causes. In 2007, Rizvi partnered with MuchMoreMusic to spearhead Sing For South Asia, a charity concert to raise funds for victims of the 2005 Kashmir earthquake. In 2008, Rizvi decided to donate partial profit from the sales of his song "Win or Defeat" to the Canadian Paralympic Foundation, an organization dedicated to enriching the lives of Canadians with disabilities through sport. Between 2009 and 2010, Rizvi participated in a series of performances for Hands Up Canada, a charitable initiative to support Paralympic Sports across 30 shopping malls in Canada.

== Collaborations and awards ==
- Rizvi came into Fatlabs Studios to work with Canadian producer Vikas Kohli on a number of tracks for his debut album From Under the Bleachers, such as "Mind over Murder", "Final Conversation" and "Win or Defeat".
- Rizvi was the recipient of the 2008 Anokhi Sexy and Successful Music Award for Most Promising Musical Artist. Other winners and attendees included Slumdog Millionaire's Freida Pinto. Rizvi also performed at the Gala.
