= Write Angle =

Screenwriting contest

The Write Angle Contest was a screenwriting contest organised by Sulekha.com, the B4U Movies Television channel and co-sponsored in the US by MetLife. The panel of judges included Shyam Benegal, Javed Akhtar, Mahesh Bhatt, Mira Nair, Tanuja Chandra, Farrukh Dhondy, John Matthew Matthan, Honey Irani and Santosh Sivan. According to its sponsors, the contest attracted more than 1800 entries from 50 countries. The prize money of $5000 was the largest amount ever awarded for a writing competition in India. The contest opened in November, 2001 and closed in June, 2002.
