= Whisky Is Risky =

- Directed by: Dhaval Patel
- Written by: Dhaval Patel
- Produced by: Rameshbhai Patel
- Starring: Nirmit Vaishnav; Raju Barot; Rakesh Poojara; Shalaka Shiroya; Kshitisha Soni
- Cinematography: Amol Gole
- Edited by: Ashwin Ramnathan
- Music by: Samir - Mana
- Production company: White Ink Pictures Pvt. Ltd.
- Release date: 4 April 2014
- Running time: 95 minutes
- Country: India
- Languages: Urban, Gujarati
- Budget: ₹10 million (US$100,000)

Whisky Is Risky (Gujarati: વ્હિસ્કી ઇઝ રિસ્કી) (previously titled 'Tiraad') is a 2014 Gujarati drama film directed by Dhaval Patel and produced by Rameshbhai Patel. This film features Nirmit Vaishnav, Raju Barot, Rakesh Poojara, Shalaka Shiroya, Kshitisha Soni, Tejal Panchasara in lead roles. The film is on a classic modern tale that depicts the life of six individuals who live largely different lives. But a single incident crossed their lives to each other in way they never even thought of.

== Plot ==
Arjun Chaturvedi, a corrupt police officer is facing imprisonment on charges for a crime he actually never committed. His rivals, a powerful state minister, Vijendra and liquor mafia, Vishnu, trick him into an inescapable situation. The court is yet to decide Arjun's end. If he survives the case, he will be a dangerous threat to all his rivals. But his enemies who are well aware of Arjun's brutal rage, plan his death within the jail premises, but fail to kill him. Arjun goes into coma for a long period of time, wherein he recollects his entire past trying to untangle the mess he had created because of his desire.

The day, he picked up the college group and accused Jaysingh Rana, student to be a bootlegger. He misbehaves with Jia, a college student and loots her rich father, Hardeep Singh for holding an alcohol party at home. Arjun recollects the night when he was mocked at by the minister in front of everybody. He knew none of them have been clean players. He understood how the air of authority controls each and every being. He was betrayed by the people he had now served for a long time. He was left alone. Till now he was blinded by the money and the power if his uniform. He had nothing much to go back to; he was passing through a rough phase in his marriage too. The night he loses his control and shouts at his wife Shruti, is his anniversary that, he had completely forgotten. His heart broken, and on the verge of killing himself but there too he stood alone, defeated at the hands of courage. Finally when he decides to get up and apologise for his mistakes, destiny takes a vicious turn. The traumatizing day he felt his heart melt, the sight of hundreds of people ailing and crying around him slapped him hard. He was thrown into reality for the first time away from the cloud of materialism. He stood there shaken to his soul.

The people accused him for a tragedy of which he never knew about. A great trap swung on him, leaving him helpless. The bribes, the uncouth politician and the smart liquor mafia, all came back to him like a flash. He solves the mystifying puzzle, one by one, that had led him to this hospital bed. Now he knew exactly, how the game was flipped to trap him. Before the manipulative and deceitful politics could trap him again and kill him, Arjun wakes up from coma; this time more powerful and focused about his desire.

== Soundtrack ==
The soundtrack of Whisky Is Risky is composed by Samir Raval, Mana Raval, whilst the lyrics have been penned by Jigar Dave, Dipak Anand. The album features Parthiv Gohil, Aman Trikha, Shivang Dave, Darshan Raval, Jigardan Gadhvi, and Rucha Raval behind the mic.

Whisky Is Risky

Soundtrack album
- Released: 1 March 2014
- Length: 21:56

=== Track listing ===
Track No	Song	Singer(s)	Composer	Lyrics
1	Whisky Is Risky	Shivang Dave	Samir - Mana	Jigar Dave; Deepak Anand
2	Meghdhanush Na Saat Chhe Rango	Aman Trikha	Samir - Mana	Deepak Anand
3	It's Time to Party	Darshan Raval, Jigardan Gadhavi, Rucha Raval	Samir - Mana	Jigar Dave
4	Ek Vaat Emaj Amasti	Parthiv Gohil	Samir - Mana	Jigar Dave

== Cast ==
Number	Cast	Role
1	Nirmit Vaishnav	Arjun Chaturvedi
2	Raju Barot	Vijendra Barot
3	Shalaka Shiroya	Jiya Kaur
4	Kshitisha Soni	Shruti Chaturvedi
5	Tejal Panchasara	Ashok’s Wife
6	Rakesh Poojara	Vishnu Desai
7	Bhargav Joshi	Builder
8	Hardik Shah	Rana
9	Nisarg Trivedi	Hardeepsingh Kaur
10	Anpurna Shukla	Rana's Mother
11	Jigar Bundela	Ashok

== Production ==
Producer Rameshbhai Patel announced the film in 2014. The movie production started with the recording of the songs in May 2013.

== Release ==
The film was released on 4 April 2014 in major cities across the Gujarat, India.
