= Fatlabs =

Recording studio in Ontario

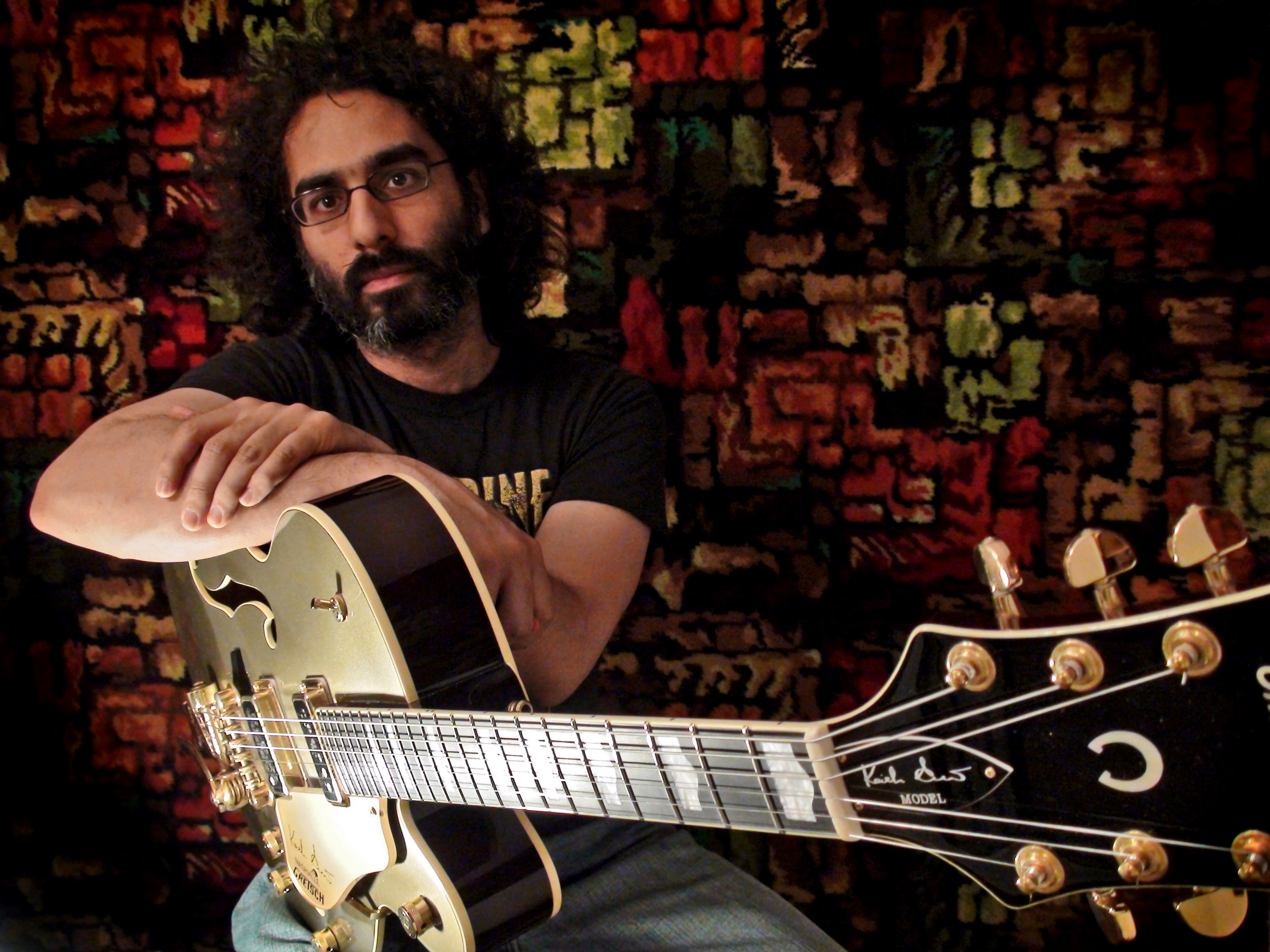
- Vikas Kohli in his studio

Background information
- Origin: Mississauga, Ontario, Canada
- Genres: Rock, punk, jazz, metal, country, soul, pop, hip-hop, Bhangra
- Years active: 2003–2013
- Website: www.fatlabs.com

FatLabs is a production company and recording studio in Mississauga, Ontario, Canada. It was established in 2003 by Vikas Kohli. The studio is known for its ability to work with a variety of genres.

== Filmography ==
=== Mission Istaanbul ===
Vikas Kohli was commissioned to produce and co-arrange the song "Apun Ke Saath" for the Bollywood director Apoorva Lakhia’s major motion picture action film Mission Istanbul which was internationally released on July 25, 2008, and performed by Vivek Oberoi live at the 2008 International Indian Film Academy Awards in Bangkok.

=== Tom, Dick & Harry Rock Again ===
Vikas Kohli produced the song "Tere Pyar Mein", which will be featured in the sequel to the Bollywood major motion picture comedy film Tom, Dick, and Harry (2006 film) featuring Indian pop star Mika Singh.

=== Shanti Baba Ram and the Dancers of Hope ===
Vikas Kohli produced and co-wrote the title track "Dil Yeh" for the film Shanti Baba Ram and the Dancers of Hope, produced by the Canadian Film Centre which was founded by Academy-nominated Norman Jewison. The film was screened at the Montreal World Film Festival, Atlantic Film Festival, Filmi Film Festival, Yellowknife Film Festival, ReelWorld Film Festival, Masala Mehndi Masti, Worldwide Short Film Festival, Lanzarote Film Festival. The film has also been broadcast on CBC, Canwest and Showtime

=== I Do. Do I? ===
Vikas Kohli composed the score for the film "I Do. Do I?" produced by About Time Productions, which has screened at Filmi Film Festival, Mosaic, and Masala Mehndi Masti. The film has also secured a distribution deal with Ouat! Media

=== My Father, The Terrorist? ===
"My Father, The Terrorist?" Features an original score by Vikas Kohli and had its world premier at Film North and screened at Moving Images Film Festival

=== "The Bee" and "The Party" ===
Vikas Kohli composed the score for the two short films "The Bee" and "The Party", both of which screened at Masala Mehndi Masti and were directed by Vikram Dasgupta The Bee won Best Environmental Film and received an honourable mention by Deepa Mehta at the Toronto Urban Film Festival

=== "Malla Mall" ===
Vikas Kohli composed original music for the film Malla Mall directed by Lalita Krishna.

=== "Wild Goose Daddy" ===
Vikas Kohli composed the score to the film Wild Goose Daddy directed by filmmaker Samuel Kiehoon Lee.

== Discography ==
=== Moka Only ===
Rap artist Moka Only collaborated with Vikas on the Jennifer Abadesso track, "Did You Think", which charted internationally, hitting No. 1 on Radio Alpha 98.6 FM Paris, No. 4 on the hottest Indie Tracks and No. 8 on the Paris, France Top 20 countdown. Vikas also collaborated on the song "Nothing to Prove", featuring Moka Only and Lenny Diko.

=== State of Bengal & Sheniz Janmohamed ===
State of Bengal (Saifullah [Sam] Zaman), a British Asian Underground DJ/Producer from the UK collaborated with Canadian poet Sheniz Janmohamed at Fatlabs studio.

=== Cappadonna/Tef & Don ===
American rapper and affiliate of the Wu-Tang Clan, Cappadonna, joined forces with Toronto rap artists Tef & Don to work on the track "MI Familia" at Fatlabs studio.

=== Deva Bratt ===
In 2007, Deva Bratt, reggae/rap artist of the well recognized WAR FACTORY caused a ruckus in dancehalls with intricate and inspirational lyrics, with hits like "Bungle a Gyal", and "Bag a Talking/Gussy Clarke". In 2008, Deva worked with FatLabs on a collaboration with Mika Singh.

=== J'sin ===
Kohli produced and co-wrote rock artist and 2010 Canadian Music Week performer jsin's debut album Born. The music video for "Inside" the first single off the album premiered at the 2010 ReelWorld Film Festival.

=== Apache Indian ===
Vikas Kohli produced and co-wrote "Indian Boy" by South Asian pop artist Rebecca Nazz, featuring UK musician Apache Indian. The House-infused pop song will be released and available on iTunes September 25, 2010 as the debut single from Rebecca's latest CD

=== Scribblepen ===
Massive studio project with "Scribblepen" features musicians Nick Czarnagorski (Johnny Reid, George Canyon), Jeremy Kleynhans (Rebel Emergency), Jake Payne (Colin Amey), Colin Robinson (Chantal Kreviazuk, Fefe Dobson, Melissa Auf der Maur, K-OS), Anthony Carone (The Knockouts, illScarlett), Leah Speers (God Make Me Funky), Kevin Watt, Nadia Syed and James McGregor

=== Zameer Rizvi ===
Source:

=== Tash ===
Source:

=== Mika Singh ===
Punjabi artist turned Bollywood artist, Mika Singh, worked on several songs and albums with Vikas Kohli, including the songs Whiskey featuring, Nararein Milane Wali, Tere Pyar Mein, Bin Tera, and Mission Istanbul.

== Live Events ==
Under FatLabs, Vikas Kohli has created various live event productions, including the inaugural Bollywood Monster Mashup for the International Indian Film Academy Awards in 2011, the Monster Rock Orchestra in 2012 in Port Credit, and the Mississauga Arts Council 30th Anniversary event in 2012 at Mississauga Celebration Square.

== Appearances ==
Vikas Kohli has been interviewed by Johney Brar on the Desi Live (HumDesi) radio station multiple times.

Vikas Kohli has also been interviewed on CBC Radio programs Masala Canada by Wojtek Gwiazda, Metro Morning, and CJMT-TV/OMNI TV2 program Bollywood Boulevard.

Vikas Kohli has been featured in such publications as CBC, The Globe and Mail and Toronto Star.

He has also been in international media such as MSN, Yahoo, Sulekha and Zee News, and has been featured in reports on Asian News International, ATN, CBC Radio One, Lehren TV, Omni Television, TV Asia and Vision TV.

Vikas Kohli has moderated talks and conducted interviews with Shibani Kashyap.
