= Shaukeen Kaminay =

- Directed by: Anil Chorasiya
- Written by: Brajesh Pandey
- Produced by: Pratima Brajesh Pandey; Brajesh Pandey
- Cinematography: Mayank Tiwari
- Edited by: Sanjay Kumar
- Music by: Monotosh Degharia; Dharam Dewda; Rajiv Mona; Rajib Roy; Monty Sharma
- Release date: 2016
- Running time: 120 minutes
- Country: India
- Language: Hindi

Shaukeen Kaminay is a 2016 contemporary Indian film directed by Anil Chorasiya. The directorial debut is a Hindi-language film. The film is produced under MFA Motion Pictures by Brajesh Pandey.

== Production ==
The filming of Shaukeen Kaminay started on 15 January 2015. The film was shot in Mumbai, Varanasi, Ghazipur, Mahabaleshwar and Goa.

== Soundtrack ==
The music for Shaukeen Kaminay was composed by Rajib-Mouna and Dharam Dewda, and launched on 8 March 2016. The film has four songs; the lyrics for the songs are written by Dharam Dewda, Brajesh Pandey and Allahmeher Malik. Aman Trikha, Javed Ali and Mohammad Irfan have sung the songs for the album.

== Cast ==
- Narendra Tiwari as Som
- Kartik Gaur as Hardik
- Sahil Garg as Sunny
- Vanshika Gupta as Sonali
- Yasmin Pathan as Divya
- Priyanka Singh as Pallavi
- Pramod Shukla as Phundru
- Manisha Singh as Sheela
- Seema Billong as Kalawati
- Vandana as Riya

== Reception ==
The Free Press Journal called the film "A bad joke."
