= Masala! Mehndi! Masti! =

South Asian arts and entertainment festival

Masala! Mehndi! Masti! meaning "Spice! Henna! Fun!" is the largest interdisciplinary South Asian arts and entertainment festival outside of South Asia. This free event takes place annually in Toronto, Ontario, Canada (GTA) at the Exhibition Place over a three-day period. The festival exhibits local and international South Asia inspired talent in areas such as music, fashion, dance, theatre, film, visual arts and crafts, literary works, yoga, social issues and more.

== History ==
The brainchild of Abhishek Mathur and Jyoti Rana, Masala! Mehndi! Masti! was created in 2001.

Since its launch the festival has seen rapid growth. Attendance growth: 25,000 to over 100,000, of visitors of all ethnicities attended from 2001 to 2008. The annual festival brings together professionals and performers from across Canada and all over the world including Australia, Bangladesh, Guyana, India, Japan, Nepal, Pakistan, Sri Lanka, Trinidad, the United Kingdom and the United States. In 2010, M!M!M! celebrated its 10th anniversary which includes the first ever Masala! Mehndi! Masti! Winterfest at Harbourfront Centre, the venue where the festival presented its first five editions.

== Summer event ==
The event is a mix of music, dance and film performances with over 70 events and performances across multiple stages.

Canadian producer Vikas Kohli of Fatlabs studios has interviewed several Bollywood celebrity singers, sat in on various panels, performed and had his own compositions performed by different artists, and films that he has scored have screened at Masala Mendi Maasti almost every year.

Headline acts have included Rahul Bose, Nandita Das, Rishi Rich, Jay Sean, Juggy D, Shiamak Davar, Toronto Tabla Ensemble, Trickbaby, Indian Ocean, Lisa Ray, Shibani Kashyap and Shweta Subram.

== Winterfest ==
In 2010, M!M!M! launched the first ever Masala! Mehndi! Masti! Winterfest at the Harbourfront Centre. 2010 marked the 10th anniversary for M!M!M!. Highlights included Pakistani rockers Kazak, Indo-Persian dance, a licensed Dhol drum circle that featured Bhangra and Desi styles, and a screening of Dileep Mehta's Cooking with Stella, starring Don McKellar.
