= Policegiri =

- Theatrical release poster
- Directed by: K.S. Ravikumar
- Written by: Farhad-Sajid (Dialogues)
- Screenplay by: K.S. Ravikumar; Farhad-Sajid
- Based on: Saamy by Hari
- Produced by: T.P. Aggarwal
- Starring: Sanjay Dutt; Prakash Raj; Prachi Desai
- Cinematography: N. K. Ekambaram
- Edited by: Samjith Mohammed
- Music by: Himesh Reshammiya; Meet Bros Anjjan
- Production company: STAR Entertainment
- Distributed by: STAR Entertainment
- Release date: 5 July 2013
- Country: India
- Language: Hindi

Policegiri (transl. Police acts) is a 2013 Indian Hindi-language action film directed by K.S. Ravikumar and produced by T. P. Aggarwal and Rahul Aggarwal. The film features Sanjay Dutt, Prakash Raj and Prachi Desai in the lead roles. The film was released on 5 July 2013. The film is the official remake of the 2003 Tamil film Saamy, directed by Hari.

== Plot ==
The movie begins with a man (Sanjay Dutt) drinking beer early in the morning and then following up with having beer and idli. He later steals a bike and goes to the police station to get a commission from the police inspector. He then meets a man who takes him to a place where they sell guns and bombs. Finally, he meets a local gangster who hires him to kill a minister. He then kills the gangster and his henchmen and reveals himself as DCP Rudra Aditya Devraj, the new cop in town, near the Andhra Pradesh-Maharashtra border.

The city of Nagapuram is riddled with crime and corruption and is controlled by Nagori Subramaniam (Prakash Raj), the local mafia and a politician maker. Initially, Rudra closes down a lot of illegal businesses in Nagori. But when Rudra meets Nagori, he reveals that he is also a corrupt cop like others and even takes bribes on the condition that Nagori accepts certain points. Nagori accepts, and there is a truce between the two.

Meanwhile, Rudra falls in love with a girl named Seher (Prachi Desai) whom he first encountered in the beginning and she then reciprocates his love.

Conflict starts when residents complain about a petrol pump selling less petrol to the public and a lady beaten up when she complained. The petrol pump is owned by Nagori. Rudra beats up the employees of the pump as well as Nagori's henchmen. Nagori catches Rudra and Seher and tells her that he accepts bribes which causes Seher to leave Rudra. A war emerges between the two.

Nagori then calls for a bandh of the market place. But on the day of bandh, Rudra and his team are prepared and drive away all the protestors. Rudra then becomes a hero for the people of the city. But Nagori exacts his revenge by causing a riot in the market place and also blowing up a bomb killing many innocent people on the very same day Rudra is marrying Seher. Nagori then tries to kidnap Seher but Rudra saves her life in time. Rudra's activities invites the wrath of the police commissioner, who tries to control Rudra but in vain.

Rudra then receives his transfer orders and has seven days left in the town. He challenges Nagori that seven days is enough to finish him. The next day, Nagori's men take out a procession with the aim to kill Rudra. But Rudra and his team are prepared and he along with the market place sellers who are armed and are on his side. Amidst the tear gas smoke, Rudra kills many of Nagori's men including an MLA with a pistol he bought in black market in the beginning. A market place seller kills one of the MLA's men who raped his sister. In order to cover up, Rudra blames the crowd for the mishaps.

Rudra then kidnaps Nagori's close accomplice who confesses for his, Nagori's and the bomb maker's involvements in the bomb blast and gets a warrant to arrest. Furious, Nagori under the Terrorist Act. Rudra is then called to a meeting by the commissioner where MLAs, MPs, Senior Police Officers and Ministers threaten him. He smartly controls them by claiming that his pen has a camera and a voice recorder and he'll release the footage to media. Nagori goes into hiding after knowing that Rudra can't be stopped.

A couple of days later, Rudra catches Nagori who is dressed as a beggar near the temple. He takes Nagori to secluded spot after beating all his henchmen. He then kills Nagori by burning him to death ensuring that Nagori is never found and is declared as a wanted criminal.

== Cast ==
- Sanjay Dutt as Deputy Commissioner of Police Officer Rudra Aditya Devraj (Baba)
- Prachi Desai as Seher Al Ameri
- Prakash Raj as Nagori Subramaniam
- Mukesh Tiwari as Padam Bhola
- Murali Sharma as MLA Gadhe
- Raju Mavani as MLA Gadha
- Manoj Joshi as Inspector Javed Sheikh
- Ramesh Khanna as Wine Shop Owner
- Rajpal Yadav as Tutu
- Rajat Rawail as Toto
- Besant Ravi as corrupt police inspector
- Mia Uyeda as Priya Sharda
- Om Puri as Commissioner Prashant Trivedi
- K. Subash as Judge
- K.S.Ravikumar, the film director, makes a cameo appearance as a guest who is drunk at the party arranged by Nagori.

== Production ==
The film was initially called Thanedaar Returns, referring to a previous hit film of Sanjay Dutt, Thanedaar. However Dutt did not feel comfortable with the title, and the makers did not want to give the impression that it was a sequel to Thanedaar. Subsequently, Dutt suggested to brainstorm for another name. He suggested Policegiri and the unit agreed.

== Soundtrack ==
Policegiri

Soundtrack album by Himesh Reshammiya Meet Bros Anjjan
- Released: 14 June 2013
- Genre: Film soundtrack
- Label: T-Series
- Producer: Anshul Karwa

Himesh Reshammiya Meet Bros Anjjan chronology
| Shortcut Romeo (2013) | Policegiri (2013) | Naam (2013) |

The soundtrack album was composed by Himesh Reshammiya and Meet Bros Anjjan. The music rights was bought by T-Series. Lyrics were penned by Shabbir Ahmed and Aslam Lashkariya.

All lyrics are written by Shabbir Ahmed except where noted.

Track listing
| No. | Title | Singer(s) | Length |
|---|---|---|---|
| 1. | "Robinhood" (Aslam Lashkariya) | Anjjan – Meet Bros | 04:50 |
| 2. | "Chura Ke Leja" | Yashraj Kapil, Palak Muchhal | 04:49 |
| 3. | "Jhoom Barabar Jhoom" | Vinit Singh, Shabab Sabri, Aman Trikha, Pavni Pandey | 04:44 |
| 4. | "Tirat Meri Tu" | Vinit Singh, Shabab Sabri, Palak Muchhal | 04:57 |
| 5. | "Policegiri" | Aman Trikha, Rajdeep Chatterjee, Yashraj Kapil, Keshav | 04:44 |

== Reception ==
=== Critical response ===
The film received extremely poor reviews from critics.

Saibal Chatterjee of NDTV rated the film one out of five stars and wrote, "The actors holler at the top of their voices, the action sequences are mind-numbingly silly, the background score can pierce through any cotton-wool shield, and the storyline is all sound and fury, and little else." Rohit Vats of IBN Live gave the film one-and-a-half out of five stars and wrote, "Ravikumar is good at many things such as the colour combination in the backdrop and aerial stunts but his wish to generate many emotions within the same sequence doesn't help 'Policegiri'."

Shubhra Gupta of The Indian Express gave it one out of five stars and wrote, "There is not one thing about this film that is worthy of being watched." Giving the same rating, Sukanya Verma of Rediff.com wrote, "K S Ravikumar’s remake of Tamil hit Saamy is so hopelessly timeworn, neither its jaded leading man nor its crummy screenplay can salvage this mess no matter how many men Dutt hurls in the sky."

Karan Anshuman of Mumbai Mirror compared the film to Dabangg. Sarit Ray of Hindustan Times wrote, "The music is bland, and the south-inspired action repetitive, giving you little to take away (headache notwithstanding). Policegiri is entirely forgettable. And that may be a good thing."

=== Box office ===
The film was declared an average grosser due to its good business in single screen theatres and in tier 2, tier 3 and tier 4 cities.
