= Rainbow Riots =

LGBT art organization

Rainbow Riots is a non-profit organisation that creates arts and cultural projects to advocate for human rights for LGBTQ people around the world. It was founded in 2012 by Petter Wallenberg, a Swedish artist, musician, director and human rights activist, who creates artistic collaborations with fellow LGBT people all over the world to advocate for equality.

== History ==
Rainbow Riots was founded in 2016 when Petter Wallenberg was in Uganda working on a music collaboration with the Ugandan LGBTQ community. In a shocking turn of events, suddenly Wallenberg and his Ugandan collaborators ended up being held hostage as the police stormed in and raided Uganda Pride. Swedish newspaper Expressen reported how him and his colleagues were forced down on the floor for hours by armed police officers who also arrested several LGBT people.

The violent incident led to Wallenberg founding the organization Rainbow Riots, to use arts and culture as tools to advocate for human rights for LGBT people everywhere.

In 2017, the organisation released an album of original music, ‘Rainbow Riots’, composed and produced by Wallenberg, featuring queer voices from the world's most dangerous countries for LGBTQ people. The album was championed by the BBC, who called it ”the ultimate protest”, and by Dazed Digital, who called it ”the zenith of international queer activism.”

The first single from Rainbow Riots, Equal Rights, composed and produced by Wallenberg featuring Jamaican rapper Mista Majah P, was part of the United Nations ‘Global Goals’ campaign: an initiative to end extreme poverty, inequality and climate change by 2030.

In 2017 Rainbow Riots opened Stockholm Pride. It was the first time that Ugandan LGBTQ artists performed internationally. The same year the Rainbow Riots team organized the only Pride related event in Kampala, after the police had shut the celebrations down.

In 2018 Rainbow Riots launched its own podcast Rainbow Riots Radio, created and presented by Wallenberg, exploring queer stories, culture and history from around the world.

In 2019 Rainbow Riots opened Uganda's first LGBT community centre, a safe space for LGBT people in a country where same sex relations are illegal. The centre had not even opened before it courted controversy in Uganda. Minister Lokodo condemned the project and told British newspaper The Guardian that opening the centre would be a criminal act. Nevertheless, Rainbow Riots pressed on with the project, resulting in the creation of East-Africa's first LGBT community which stayed open for a year.

Also in 2019 the music album Rainbow Riots India was released. It was composed and produced by Wallenberg featuring India's first openly queer artists, as part of the movement time of the decriminalization of same sex relations in India 2018. The first single was dubbed ‘India’s first Pride anthem’ by Indian media and the music was premiered at India's first legal Pride in Mumbai 2019.

The same year Wallenberg and his Indian collaborators performed the music from the album at Stockholm Pride, making this the first time Indian LGBT artists headlined an international Pride festival.

In 2022 Rainbow Riots released the first ever song with a World Pride theme to protest against hatred towards LGBT people. The single "We Don't Care" is composed and produced by Rainbow Riots' founder, Swedish gay artist Petter Wallenberg, and features queer voices from four continents, including countries where same sex relations are illegal, all on the same song. All proceeds go to the victims of the Oslo Pride terrorist attack.
