= Petter Wallenberg =

Swedish writer

- Born: 3 November 1977 (age 49); Stockholm, Sweden
- Occupations: artist, author, director

Petter Wallenberg (born 1977 in Stockholm) is a Swedish artist and director. He is the founding director of Bland drakar och dragqueens ("Among dragons and drag queens"), a theatre production where drag queens perform stories to children. Wallenberg is also the founding director of Rainbow Riots, a non-profit organisation that uses arts and culture to advocate for human rights for LGBT people globally. He has composed and produced several music albums and in 2013 his book Historien om Leila K ("The Story of Leila K") was released in Sweden.

== Music ==
In 2013, under his stage name House of Wallenberg, he released his debut album "Legends", featuring collaborations with amongst others Neneh Cherry, Ari Up of The Slits, Nicolette of Massive Attack fame, Yo Majesty and Victoria Wilson James from Soul II Soul.

The single "Legendary", featuring Swedish rap singer Leila K, became a Scandinavian radio and club hit and "Girls Like Us" featuring Efti from "Midi, Maxi & Efti", reached #28 on Finland Dance Music Chart. "Be Somebody", samples Octavia St. Laurent from the 1991 documentary about the vogue scene of New York, Paris is Burning. The video features a cast from the famous vogue houses of NYC, such as House of Ninja.

Legends received very positive reviews. Swedish music magazine Sonic rated it 9/10. In July 2013 House of Wallenberg released the single "Love Yourself Test Yourself" as the theme of a major Swedish campaign to stop HIV. Hollywood blogger Perez Hilton called it a "positive, uplifting, dancefloor ANTHEM".

In 2016, he released his follow up album My House is Your House, inspired by early house and gospel. The single "I Believe" featured house music pioneer Adeva and reached #22 at Music Week Club Chart.

In 2017 Wallenberg composed and produced Rainbow Riots, a music album featuring queer voices from some of the most dangerous countries in the world for LGBTQ people. UK magazine Dazed called it "the zenith of international queer activism" and British broadcaster BBC deemed it "the ultimate protest" and concluded: "This is advocacy". A chapter has been named after Rainbow Riots in the book Breaking down the walls of heartache - how music came out, by British journalist Martin Aston. Rainbow Riots was also featured in a news story from the Jamaican Observer, famously one of the world's most hostile countries towards LGBT people.

In 2019 he composed and produced the music album Rainbow Riots India featuring India's first openly queer singers. The project was a collaboration with members of the Indian LGBTQ+ movement that achieved the historic victory of legalizing same sex relations in India in 2018. The first single was dubbed "India's first Pride anthem" by Indian media.

In 2022 he composed and produced the single "We Don't Care" featuring queer voices from four different continents, including countries where it is illegal to be LGBT, all on the same song. The song is a protest against LGBT-phobia and all proceeds go to victims of LGBT phobic hate crimes.

== Advocacy ==
In 2013 Petter created the musical campaign "Love Yourself Test Yourself" to encourage testing for HIV. The campaign went on to win a Clio Award, one of the world's most recognizable international advertising awards, and resulted in a renewed increase in HIV-testing.

In 2016 during the making of the music album Rainbow Riots, Wallenberg and his Ugandan collaborators were held hostage in the police raid of Uganda Pride. Swedish newspaper reported how him and his colleagues were forced down on the floor for hours by armed police officers who also arrested several LGBT people.

The violent incident led to Wallenberg founding the organization of the same name: Rainbow Riots. Rainbow Riots, an international non-profit organisation that uses arts and culture to advocate for human rights for LGBT people everywhere.

== Theatre productions ==
In 2017 Wallenberg created and directed the theatre production Bland drakar och dragqueens (Amongst dragons and drag queens), where drag queens perform fairy tales to children. Since the premiere the Stockholm Public Library, the production has continuously toured Sweden and even made a guest appearance at Brooklyn Public Library in New York.

Bland drakar och dragqueens has received major media coverage, including the front page of Swedish newspaper Dagens Nyheter and national Swedish television channels SVT and TV4.

In 2022 Wallenberg wrote and directed a musical play for children at The Stockholm Concert Hall in Stockholm, Sweden, as part of his concept Bland drakar och dragqueens with famous drag artists. The play included an original script, drag show, self penned songs as well as classical music played live by the Royal Stockholm Philharmonic Orchestra’s Academy with musicians from all over Europe. Since the premiere, the show has returned to Konserthuset Stockholm toured around Sweden.

== Books and media ==
Wallenberg is the author of two published books: Historien om Leila K (2013) and Bögjävlar (2007).

As a writer, editor in chief and art director, he also created and ran his own award winning arts and culture magazine Mums from 2009 to 2014.
