= Indigenous storytelling in North America =

Indigenous cultures in North America engage in storytelling about morality, origin, and education as a form of cultural maintenance, expression, and activism. Falling under the banner of oral tradition, it can take many different forms that serve to teach, remember, and engage Indigenous history and culture. Since the dawn of human history, oral stories have been used to understand the reasons behind human existence. Today, Indigenous storytelling is part of the broader indigenous process of building and transmitting indigenous knowledge.

Though different Indigenous cultures have different oral traditions, across the board Indigenous peoples in North America interpret oral traditions similarly because they encode basic values that are consistent across cultures. Some common themes of oral traditions include respect for elders, origins, and respect for the environment. The Elders in many Indigenous communities regularly share oral stories with children. Oral traditions educated younger generations and maintained indigenous social, spiritual, and cultural systems for ten thousand years. According to Bastion and Michaels, colonialism, through the spread of disease and disenfranchisement, reduced the indigenous populations of North America, though their stories sustained.

Currently, Indigenous groups are using storytelling to reclaim their histories, push back against colonial narratives, and draw attention to issues such as environmental protection, often through indigenous collaboration.

== Background ==
=== Terminology ===
Storytelling falls under the umbrella of broader oral traditions and can take either the form of oral history or oral tradition. The difference between the two is that oral history tells the stories that occurred in the teller's own life while oral traditions are passed down through generations and reflect histories beyond the living memory of the tribal members. Both are believed to be accurate representations of events that are part of the shared history, according to Anthropologist Robert Mason.

Myths are another part of indigenous storytelling. Rather than passing on accurate events, they focus on the spiritual forces present in the natural world and explain how and why's of human existence such as creation stories, lives of heroes, and human being's role in sustaining the world. Myths can also support the indigenous social and cultural systems and customs. Lastly, myths, though different from oral histories and traditions, can function as teaching tools or healing methods.

=== Methods ===
Regardless of whether in the form of oral history, tradition, or myth, Storytelling in indigenous cultures is passed on by oral means in a quiet and relaxing environment, which usually coincides with family or tribal community gatherings and official events such as family occasions, rituals, or ceremonial practices. Stories are not often told in the same manner twice, resulting in many variations of a single myth. This is because narrators may choose to insert new elements into old stories dependent upon the relationship between the storyteller and the audience, making the story correspond to each unique situation.

The method of storytelling was selected, largely in part, for its reflection of how biologically the human brain remembers information and the ease by which it can transmit them. Many indigenous cultures consider stories as "the language of the human spirit" not only for their representation of tangible human experiences, but also for their use as an educational and developmental tool. Though different for the numerous different tribes of indigenous peoples, stories encompass metaphors and cultural histories significant for each and operate as a reflection of the significant elements that compose their world.

=== Development ===
For indigenous cultures of the Americas, storytelling is used as an oral form of language associated with practices and values essential to developing one's identity. This is because everyone in the community can add their own touch and perspective to the narrative collaboratively – both individual and culturally shared perspectives have a place in the co-creation of the story. Oral storytelling in indigenous communities differs from other forms of stories because they are told not only for entertainment, but for teaching values. For this reason, both oral traditions and myths are part of the indigenous education system. As the stories are told, adapted, and developed, they become renewed expressions of communal knowledge. They not only teach and build a shared collective understanding, but also individual identity understanding.

== Types of storytelling in Indigenous North America ==
According to Indigenous writer Leslie Silko, there are various types of stories among many indigenous communities that may be used for coming of age themes, core values, morality, literacy and history. Indigenous American communication is rich with stories, myths, philosophies and narratives that serve as a means to exchange information.

Storytelling can be put into different types of forms such as textual, oral, personal, mythical, and sacred storytelling. Storytelling is a tool that is used to learn about life and as a way to witness and remember the past, sharing stories strengthens your bond to your roots as well as gives you a look into your ancestral past. We see through indigenous scholars through their writings the importance of storytelling and why it should be continued and expressed with their stories such as Thomas King and William Appess two important people showing the true importance of written storytelling. Having elders is important in the process of recovering traditions and resisting colonialism. Elders use their role to share their knowledge for good to reteach everything they know with all the traditional ways they have such as storytelling which is a major factor in it. "Elders are important in the process of recovery and resistance to colonial realities and in reinsertion of the importance of remembering our past and remaking our futures. Elders mentor and provide support and have systematically gathered wisdom, histories, skills, and expertise in cultural knowledge." "Histories are shared inform a discussion of (a) types of stories, (b) oral storytelling as pedagogical tools for learning life lessons, (c) the process of witnessing in storytelling to honor Indigenous traditions and ancestors and reflecting the processes of the ancestors in a modern world, and (d) sharing stories of spirituality as sources of strength." "Elders' stories inform discussions of (a) storytelling types (mythical, personal, and sacred), (b) storytelling as pedagogical tools for learning about life, (c) storytelling as witnessing and remembering, and (d) sharing stories of spirituality as sources of strength."

=== Morality ===
Indigenous stories reveal moral norms to listeners and remind them of the cultural moral values. The stories feature characters who, by acting morally or not, explain the indigenous world and how to be a moral member of it. According to Cheney, morality becomes encoded into indigenous perceptions of their world through the stories and oral traditions.

In Apache stories, elders tell stories detailing social offenses to the values of their culture. In one story, a man decided to kill a cow off of a white man's reservation. The policeman who caught him was also an Apache, but he forgot to actually turn the man in. Though the elders of the tribe told him he should, he didn't, and instead chose to isolate himself from the community. The understanding of this story is that people who join with outsiders against their own community, acting as a whiteman, will face harsh pushback from their community.

In the Sioux culture, the character of Iktomi, a spider, illustrates the follies of selfishness, disrespect, pride, and other negative traits. An example is the story of Iktomi and the boulder. In this story, Iktomi is walking along arrogantly believing that he looks good and gives his cloak to a boulder. However, when it got cold he went back and took the gift away, a major mistake in Sioux culture. Due to his mistake, the boulder chased him and pinned him down, forcing him to be saved by the bats who picked away at the boulder giving them a square nose and creating lots of pebbles. Iktomi was covered in injuries and highly embarrassed with his looks and his actions. The story illustrated how pride and vanity lead to pain and embarrassment, and reminded members of the tribe to not be arrogant or prideful unless they wished to be hurt by their actions.

The Ojibwe (or Chippewa) tribe uses the tale of an owl snatching away misbehaving children. The caregiver will often say, "The owl will come and stick you in his ears if you don't stop crying!" Thus, this form of teasing serves as a tool to correct inappropriate behavior and promote cooperation.

Parents in the Arizona Tewa community, for example, teach morals to their children through traditional narratives. Lessons focus on several topics including historical or "sacred" stories or more domestic disputes. Through storytelling, the Tewa community emphasizes the traditional wisdom of the ancestors and the importance of collective as well as individual identities.

Indigenous communities teach children valuable skills and morals through the actions of good or mischievous stock characters while also allowing room for children to make meaning for themselves. By not being given every element of the story, children rely on their own experiences and not formal teaching from adults to fill in the gaps.

=== Origin ===
Hernandez-Avilla explains that origin stories allow indigenous groups to connect to their world and to understand their identities and how they fit into the historical space and time. Origin stories allow for reconfirmation of the relationship between creation and human beings, and for that relationship to be passed on through generations.

In Sioux culture, the story of The Great Race explains how humans became the dominant animal. In this story, humans and buffalo had a great race in which the winner would be the hunter while the loser would be the hunted. Humans were able to win with the help of the magpie bird, and thus, man became the hunter while buffalo supplied food, clothing, shelter, and other helpful things. In return, humans would respect the animals for their sacrifice. This story explains why the buffalo were so integral to the plains culture. It also helps explain why every part of the buffalo was used and not much went to waste due to their cultural respect for the animal. A similar story is called the Medicine Dance. In this story, the creator noticed that people were sick and dying. Therefore, he sent beings down to create the earth and the sky, teach the medicine dance to people, and to settle in the ground and grow healing herbs from their bodies in order to give people a way to heal themselves. This story helps explain how sickness originates and also how it can be cured.

Some origin stories are more historical in nature and deal with the location of sacred sites.

For the Cup'it Eskimo, their land origin story explains how Raven crafted their homeland of Nunivak Island by taking soil from the mainland and placing it in the ocean, where it then joined with a piece of ice floating. Raven then added mountains by pulling more soil and using the wind.

For the Apache, their place-names are part of their origin oral tradition, each named after events that happened to maintain their cultural history. Therefore, place names in Apache culture are able to remind people of their history and what occurred at those places that was significant to their ancestors and the development of their culture. These stories make members of the community think about their life, behavior, and expectations as a member of the community, serving as a social anchor.

For the Cheyenne, sacred places are connected to heroes like Sweet Medicine. He traveled to a sacred mountain and learned everything he needed to know to bring new teachings to his people. The Cheyenne still consider their traditions based in the learnings of Sweet Medicine, and the mountain he visited, Devil's Tower, is sacred.

=== Education ===
Indigenous stories are used to instruct and teach children about cultural values and lessons. The meaning within the stories is not always explicit, and children are expected to make their own meaning of the stories by asking questions, acting out the story, or telling smaller parts of the story themselves.

The Sto:lo community in Canada focuses on reinforcing children's identity by telling stories about the land to explain their roles. Elders in the Sto:lo community emphasize the importance in learning how to listen, since it requires the senses to bring one's heart and mind together. A way in which children learn about the metaphors significant for the society they live in, is by listening to their elders and participating in rituals where they respect one another.

In Donna Eder's study, Navajos were interviewed about storytelling practices that they have had in the past and what changes they want to see in the future. They notice that storytelling makes an impact on the lives of the children of the Navajos. According to some of the Navajos that were interviewed, storytelling is one of many main practices that teaches children the important principles to live a good life. In indigenous communities, stories are a way to pass knowledge on from generation to generation. For children and adults in Navajo communities, storytelling is one of the many effective ways to educate both the young and old about their cultures, identities and history. Storytelling help the Navajos know who they are, where they come from and where they belong.

In the Quechua community of Highland Peru, there is no separation between adults and children. This allows for children to learn storytelling through their own interpretations of the given story. Therefore, children in the Quechua community are encouraged to listen to the story that is being told in order to learn about their identity and culture. Sometimes, children are expected to sit quietly and listen actively. This enables them to engage in activities as independent learners.

Children of the Tohono O'odham American Indian community who engaged in more cultural practices were able to recall the events in a verbally presented story better than those who did not engage in cultural practices. Body movements and gestures help to communicate values and keep stories alive for future generations. Elders, parents and grandparents are typically involved in teaching the children the cultural ways, along with history, community values and teachings of the land.

== Oral tradition and archaeology ==
Indigenous people draw on oral tradition when making claims to protect their artifacts, traditional lands, and cultural resources.

Oral traditions help protect indigenous properties and histories when working with federal agencies in North America. The current legislation of the Native American Grave Protection and Repatriation Act (NAGPRA) requires that "geographical, kinship, biological, archaeological, anthropological, linguistic, folkloric, oral traditional, historical, or other relevant information or expert opinion" are taken into account when determining Indigenous claims to artifacts. This requirement is known as "cultural affiliation" which means that the connection between the two must depend on the evidence found, with archaeology constituting the majority of the evidence. Legally, archaeologists must consider oral traditions as a legitimate form of history and as a way to understand the culture of not only modern society, but their ancestors as well.

Archaeologists, who study artifacts from the past, have used the term "prehistory" to designate history before written language, which includes all of Indigenous peoples' oral traditions. It is indicative of a Eurocentric bias toward written rather than oral histories as being factually accurate. Anthropologists and Archaeologists favor written colonial records over Indigenous oral traditions.

The creation of NAGPRA elevates indigenous oral tradition level with written histories as it relates to Indigenous artifacts and repatriation. Indigenous stories provide deep and significant context for the anchoring of social identity, and represent a source of identity for indigenous individuals and their cultures. NAGPRA requires that legal proceedings and historians and anthropologists alike consider consistency, conformity, context, and corroborating evidence of indigenous oral tradition as a truthful recollection of historical history.

== Other uses of storytelling by Indigenous peoples ==
=== Decolonization ===
Storytelling is viewed by indigenous peoples as a way to re-know and re-claim part of their identities. According to Teresa Godwin Phelps, storytelling can provide a method to restore dignity and provide a platform to use indigenous voices to correct incorrect or incomplete narratives.

Elders play an important role in the recovery process and the resistance of colonialism on indigenous traditions. Through elders, they use themselves to help others to rekindle their relationship with their ancestral roots. This shows the importance of elders and their responsibility to help future generations with the effects of colonialism affecting indigenous culture by erasing it completely. "Elders are important in the process of recovery and resistance to colonial realities and in reinsertion of the importance of remembering our past and remaking our futures. Elders mentor and provide support and have systematically gathered wisdom, histories, skills, and expertise in cultural knowledge (Smith, 1999). Their role as Elders is based on their knowledge and the way they use their knowledge for the collective good (Smith, 1999). Elders share their stories and expertise through collaborative dialogues. Elders' stories also are shared to counter the silencing of Métis stories that have occurred (Iseke-Barnes, 2009). Haig-Brown and Dannenmann (2002) express that there is need to take seriously knowledge found in stories (p. 454) because stories can be spaces of resistance (Lewis, 2011). Stories are also shared to provide access to Métis stories that will help our children and members of the Métis Nation be proud of who we are."

For the Nuu-chah-nulth peoples, their haa-huu-pah teaches their cultural history, a history different from the nation-state of Canada. They use the haa-huu-pah to tell their story of colonization and eradication to continue transmitting their culture to the future generations. They signal a method by which they can revitalize family and community cultural norms and serve as a method of community governance that reemphasizes their indigenous values rather than Canadian systems of values.

Storytelling in the Nishaabeg culture reinforces indigenous knowledge systems as the backbone for Nishaabeg life. Simpson writes that storytelling requires the storytellers to remember and recount the experiences that shaped their ancestors, including language. She writes that "storytelling is at its core decolonizing, because it is a process of remembering, visioning, and creating a just reality where Nishnaabeg live as both Nishnaabeg and peoples."

Reproducing indigenous knowledge systems through storytelling opposes the colonial narrative. It engages groups of indigenous peoples and reforms relationships, creating an indigenous social space.

=== Environmental Protection ===
Indigenous storytelling is recognized as a method of transmitting and sustaining biocultural knowledge.

In Biigtigong Nishaabeg Culture, storytelling is a way to reclaim their native land as a context for their culture. In "Land as Pedagogy" by Leanne Simpson, she explains that storytelling fundamentally concerns the telling of and generating of the Nishnaabeg worldview. The stories themselves come "through the land," and land is required to provide the conditions for the story-telling and transmission of culture. Without the land, removed by colonialism or by environmental destruction, Nishaabeg storytelling loses its grounding point for the transmission of cultural knowledge. Nishaabeg storytelling emphasizes protection of and engagement with the environment, learning from animals and plants and taking only what is needed. Land does not only teach, but also represents how to live life.

In a nahuatl community near Mexico City, stories about ahuaques or hostile water dwelling spirits that guard over the bodies of water, contain morals about respecting the environment. If the protagonist of a story, who has accidentally broken something that belongs to the ahuaque, does not replace it or give back in some way to the ahuaque, the protagonist dies. In the community, storytelling serves as a way to teach valuing the environment and to emphasize protection of the land.
