= Sulekha =

Digital platform

- Website type: Digital Platform
- Available in: English
- Founded: 2007
- Headquarters: Chennai, Tamil Nadu, India
- Area served: India, United States, Canada, UK, UAE
- Owners: Norwest Venture Partners, Mitsui Co, Indigo Monsoon Group, GIC
- Chairperson: Param Parameswaran
- CEO: Param Parameswaran
- Products: Sulekha app
- Employees: 450
- Website: sulekha.com
- Advertising: Online
- Registration: Optional
- Current status: Active

Sulekha is a digital platform for local service businesses in India, matching 20+ million consumers with 50,000 service professionals across 200 categories in about 40 cities. Sulekha focuses on expert services clustered around Home, Life and Self and where the user need is customized. Using technology and domain intelligence, the platform seeks to understand the user need in detail and matches it to verified service professionals who are profiled. The service is free to use for consumers and service professionals pay the platform for performance in the form of verified, matched service requests. ^{]}

== Business ==
Sulekha, headquartered in Chennai, Tamil Nadu, India started its digital classifieds operations in the year 2007.

Sulekha is one of the largest services platforms in India. Sulekha is one of the earliest internet companies to come up in India. It has evolved from a local business listings site to a technology-driven matchmaking platform from 2017 to now.

In April 2015, GIC, the Sovereign Wealth Fund of Singapore, led a round of investment along with Mitsui and Norwest Venture Partners into the company.
