= CHRY-FM =

Radio station in Toronto

Coordinates: 43°46′32″N 79°30′10″W

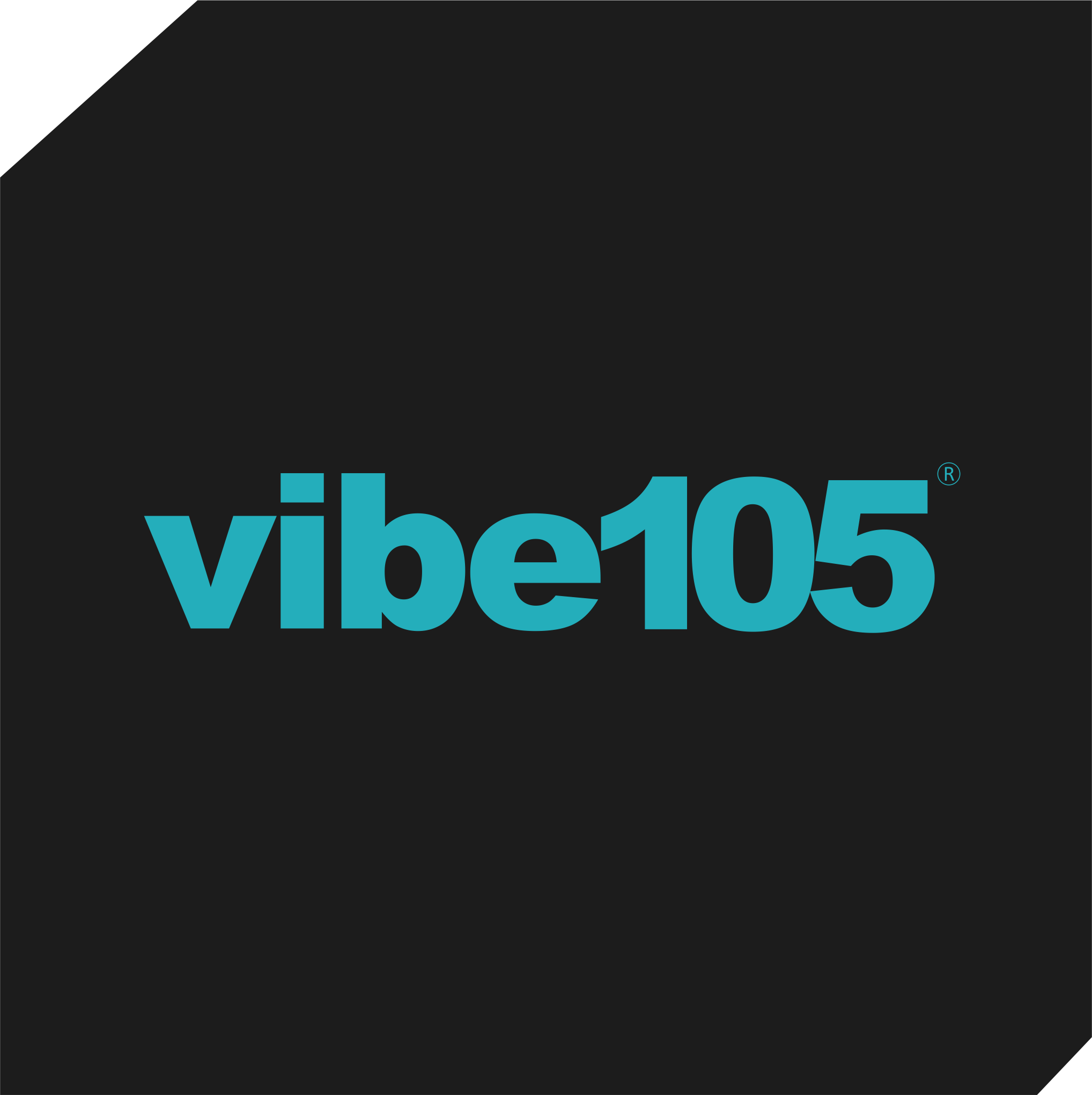
- Toronto, Ontario; Canada
- Broadcast area: North York; York Region
- Frequency: 105.5 MHz
- Branding: VIBE 105

Programming
- Format: Urban contemporary

Ownership
- Owner: Canadian Centre of Civic Media and Arts Development Inc.

History
- First air date: October 13, 1987
- Call sign meaning: Radio York

Technical information
- Class: A1
- ERP: 758 watts (average); 850 watts (maximum)
- HAAT: 63.5 m (208 ft)

Links
- Website: www.vibe105to.com

CHRY-FM (105.5 MHz), branded as VIBE 105, is a Canadian campus radio station in Toronto, Ontario. Based at York University, it broadcasts an urban contemporary format and is licensed to the Canadian Centre of Civic Media and Arts Development Inc. Its studios are located in the First Student Centre on York University's Keele campus.

The station originated as Radio York, a student-operated closed-circuit service established during the late 1960s. It began over-the-air broadcasting as CHRY-FM in 1987 and operated as a volunteer-oriented campus and community station until its relaunch as VIBE 105 in 2015.

== History ==
=== Radio York ===
Radio York began as a student-operated closed-circuit radio service at York University in the late 1960s. Contemporary CRTC evidence indicates that the station commenced operations in 1968, while York University's archival description of the Radio York fonds dates the organization's establishment to 1969.

The station initially operated from Vanier College, distributing its programming by closed-circuit cable to campus residences and common areas. In 1971, Radio York relocated within Vanier College when Rogers Cable began distributing its signal on the local cable system. That arrangement ended later in the 1970s after Rogers discontinued carriage of the service.

In 1986, York Campus Radio applied to the Canadian Radio-television and Telecommunications Commission (CRTC) for a licence to operate an FM campus radio station on 105.5 MHz with an effective radiated power of 50 watts. The proposed station was intended to expand the service beyond the university campus while maintaining a mandate of educational, cultural and community programming. The application emphasized music genres and community voices that received little exposure on commercial radio, including Black music and international folk music.

The CRTC approved the application in 1987, and CHRY-FM officially signed on at noon on October 13, 1987. The station's call sign retained the letters "RY" from Radio York. CHRY is supported in part by student levy (contributions via the York University Graduate Students Association and York Federation of Students (YFS)), through occasional grants for which the station is eligible due to its charitable status, by York University through occasional workstudy grants, and by its listenership through pledges. The rest of its funding is from advertising revenue.

=== CHRY-FM ===
CHRY-FM began broadcasting on 105.5 MHz with an effective radiated power of 50 watts. It was licensed as a community-based campus station serving both York University and communities in northwestern Toronto.

The station's programming included music that received limited exposure on commercial radio, spoken-word programs, multilingual programming and shows directed toward particular cultural communities. A 2001 CRTC review identified programming for Somali, Italian, Haitian, Tamil, Sinhalese, Afghan, South and Central American, and Hebrew-speaking audiences. By 2007, CHRY was broadcasting more than 80 programs, including programming in French Creole, Sinhalese, Tamil, Italian, French and Spanish.

CHRY developed a substantial presence in the Jane and Finch community. The station sponsored community events, participated in youth leadership and hip-hop literacy initiatives, and provided radio-production training to students from nearby schools.

The station was also an early Toronto outlet for urban music, reggae and Black-oriented programming before the launch of commercial urban station Flow 93.5 in 2001. York University's alumni magazine later described CHRY as an important institution in the development of Canadian hip hop, particularly among Toronto's Afro-Caribbean communities.

In 2006, the CRTC approved an increase in CHRY's average effective radiated power from 50 to 158 watts, along with an increase in antenna height. The technical change converted CHRY from a low-power, unprotected service to a protected station.

=== Relaunch as VIBE 105 ===
On May 1, 2015, CHRY cancelled all of its existing programs, dismissed all of its volunteers and rebranded itself as "VIBE 105". The station would adopt an "urban alternative" format, which it describes as "a diverse and metropolitan blend of Cultural, Electronic and Remix programming". The station's music mix would include Electronic, Remix, Reggae, Soca, Afrobeat, Hip hop and R&B, while it will also air talk programming.

Volunteers were to be in supportive roles, while on-air talent will be professionalized; in a departure from the station's community radio format. In response, the dismissed programmers organized community meetings and campaigning under the name #SAVECHRY in an unsuccessful effort to overturn the station's decision.

In 2016, the station applied for a license to add a nested FM repeater on 105.3 (with an average power of 92 watts, maximum of 155), with a transmitter located at 100 Wingarden Court in Scarborough (co-located with CJRK-FM). This was denied on June 16, 2017.

In 2023 and 2024, the station was awarded Best Community or Campus Station in a Major Market by an independent panel of industry peers through Broadcast Dialogue - Canadian Radio Awards.

In 2023, VIBE105 was also awarded Best Production Imaging in a Major Market among commercial and community licensed stations for their 'Celebrating 50 Years of Hip Hop' campaign.

== Awards ==
VIBE 105 was named Best Community or Campus Station in a Major Market at the 2023 Canadian Radio Awards. It also received the award for Best Imaging Production in a Major Market for its “Celebrating 50 Years of Hip Hop” campaign.

The station again won Best Community or Campus Station in a Major Market at the 2024 Canadian Radio Awards.

== Notable alumni ==
- Matt Galloway, CBC Radio host and former CHRY music director
- Danko Jones - musician, former CHRY DJ
- Dallas Good - lead singer of the Sadie's, former CHRY DJ.
