= Vikas Kohli =

Indian musician and music producer

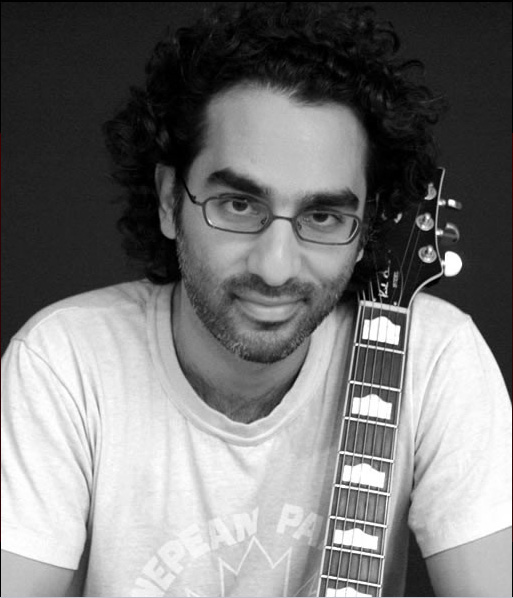

Background information
- Origin: Mississauga, Ontario, Canada
- Genres: Country, pop, bhangra, hip-hop, rock
- Years active: 2003–present

Vikas Kohli is a Canadian-Indian musician and music producer known for founding FatLabs., founding MonsterArts charity programs along with the Bollywood Monster Mashup festival, and the Monster Rock Orchestra.

Kohli has produced work across a wide range of genres, including punk, jazz, hip-hop, R&B, soul, pop, country, classical, metal, rock, and bhangra. His productions have included cross-genre fusions such as bhangra with hip-hop, blues and reggae, and Bollywood songs incorporating North American musical influences. As a film composer, Kohli has been described as an award-winning composer and the first composer to receive a Trailblazer Award from the ReelWorld Film Festival, the first composer to receive a Voice Achievers Award and a MARTY Award. He is known for song arrangements and one-on-one artist development.

== FatLabs ==
FatLabs is a production company and recording studio in Mississauga, Ontario, Canada, founded in 2003. Kohli is best known for his ability to work with multiple genres. He has produced punk, jazz, hip-hop, soul, country, pop, R&B, classical, metal, rock, and bhangra albums. He has also contributed songs to Bollywood films.

The song he produced for the Bollywood film Mission Istaanbul was performed live at the International Indian Film Academy Awards. He composed a song for the Canadian Film Centre's Shanti Baba Ram & The Dancers of Hope, which aired on Canwest Global. He also composed the song "I Do. Do I?" He has produced two albums with The Responsibles, which were nominated for Punk Recording of the Year and charted nationally; co-wrote Jennifer Abadesso's song "Did You Think", which hit #1 in Paris; produced multi-million album-selling bhangra artist Mika Singh and collaborated on projects with Cappadonna (Wu-Tang Clan), Justin Nozuka, Moka Only, and Apache Indian. Kohli has been profiled by CBC, The Globe and Mail, Toronto Star, Rogers TV, OMNI TV, Hindustan Times, MSN, AOL, Yahoo, and Zee News.

== Filmography ==
| Year | Film |
|---|---|
| 2010 | The Bee |
| 2010 | The Party |
| 2012 | MallaMall |
| 2012 | Wild Goose Chase Daddy |
| 2010 | My Father, the Terrorist? |
| | Tom, Dick & Harry Rock Again |
| 2009 | Bouma |
| | Understanding The Early Years |
| 2008 | Mission Istaanbul |
| 2009 | Shanti Baba Ram and the Dancers of Hope |
| 2009 | I Do. Do I? |

== Education ==
Vikas Kohli went to the University of Toronto's Mississauga campus in Ontario, Canada, and received an honours degree in mathematics and philosophy. He received his MBA from the Schulich School of Business of York University, and also holds a CFA charter.

== Events ==
=== International Indian Film Academy ===
Vikas Kohli has produced an event with the International Indian Film Academy Awards in Toronto, which drew over 15,000 people.

=== Bollywood Monster Mashup ===
Vikas Kohli has produced an event from the city of Mississauga entitled "Bollywood Monster Mashup", which features over 50 singers, dancers, and musicians singing and playing popular songs that expand over the black and white era of Indian cinema to the modern hits of Bollywood.

== Professional associations ==
Vikas Kohli is a member of the advisory board of the Blackwood Art Gallery, actively involved in the arts scene, and has spoken at UNESCO, NXNE, SAC, CMW, Masala Mehndi Masti, Nashville Songwriters Association, Hamilton Music Awards, Toronto Independent Music Awards, FILMI, Toronto Filmmakers Club, Mississauga Independent Film Festival, Undercurrents, Jya Fest Arts Collective, Canada Career Arts, Tin Pan North, Trebas Institute, Durham College, Toronto City Summit Alliance, and the City of Mississauga's Culture Division. He is a jury member for FACTOR, a member of the Screen Composers Guild of Canada, and sits on the Arts and Culture Grant Assessment Committee for the City of Mississauga. In 2011, Kohli produced an original live concert for the IIFAs at Mississauga's Celebration Square, which featured over 50 musicians and dancers, including Bollywood singer Monali Thakur, a string ensemble, several Indian classical musicians, and a rock band and was attended by over 15,000 people.
