= Aaman Trikha =

Indian playback singer

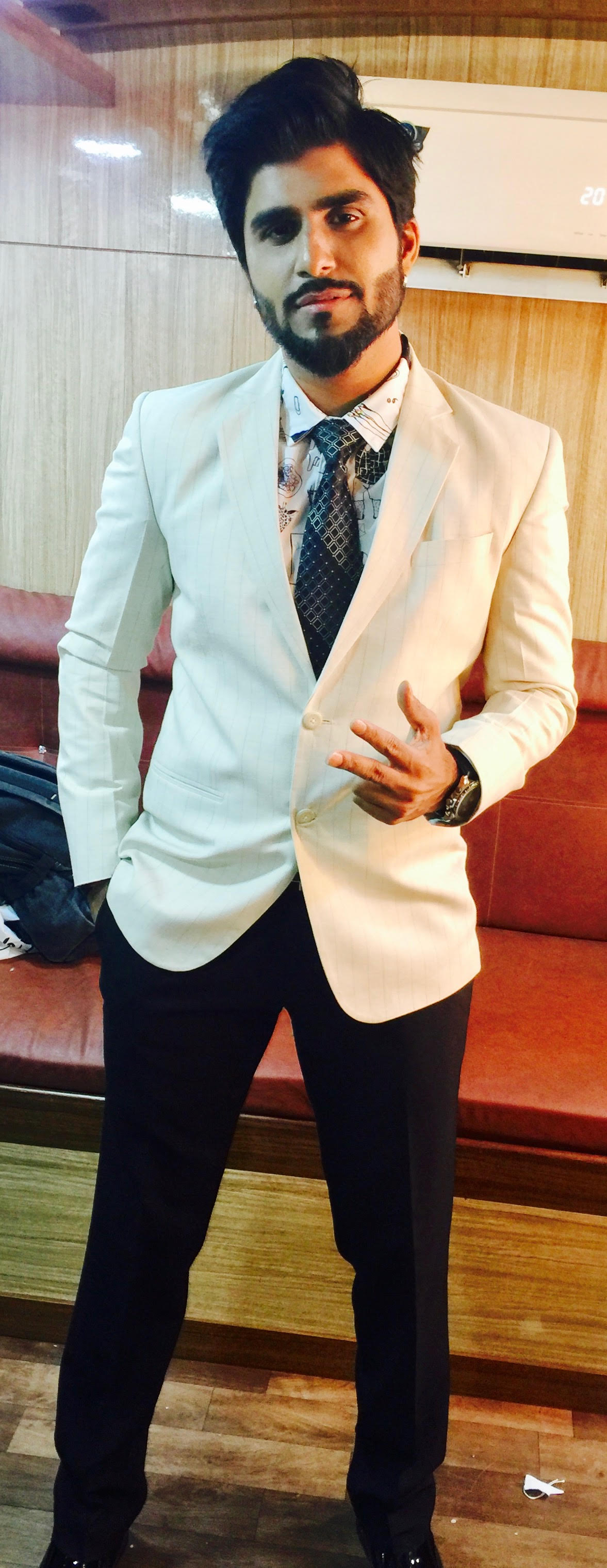
- Trikha at an award function in February 2017

Background information
- Also known as: Aaman Trikha
- Born: Aman Trikha; 12 December 1986 (age 39); Mumbai, Maharashtra, India
- Genres: Playback singing, Bollywood music
- Occupation: Singer

Aman Trikha (born 12 December 1986), also known as Aaman Trikha, is an Indian playback singer from Mumbai. He has sung songs in Hindi, English, Punjabi, Gujarati, Tamil, Bengali, Tamil, Telugu, Kannada, Tulu and other regional languages. He is the singer of popular songs like "Hookah Bar" (from Khiladi 786), "Prem Leela" (from Prem Ratan Dhan Payo), "Go Go Govinda - Reprise" (from OMG – Oh My God!) and "Achhe din aane waale hain" (the Loksabha election 2014 anthem of the Bharatiya Janata Party).

== Early life ==
Trikha started playing keyboards without any formal training. In 2005, while in the first year of pursuing his Bachelor of Engineering (B.E.) in Electronics & Telecommunication from Thakur College of Engineering and Technology, he discovered that he could sing.

== Awards and nominations ==
- 2012: Won Man of The Series Award in the Indo-Pak musical reality show Sur Kshetra
- 2013: Nominated for Best Upcoming Musical Sensation Male Award in Stardust Awards
- 2018: Won the Best Album of the Year Award in 10th Mirchi Music Awards

== Discography ==
=== Bollywood songs ===
Year	Song	Movie or album	Music director
2012	Go Go Govinda (Reprise)	OMG – Oh My God!	Himesh Reshammiya
2012	Son of Sardaar – Title Track	Son of Sardaar	Himesh Reshammiya
2012	Son of Sardaar – Title Track (Remix)	Son of Sardaar	Himesh Reshammiya
2012	Po Po	Son of Sardaar	Himesh Reshammiya
2012	Khiladi – Title Track	Khiladi 786	Himesh Reshammiya
2012	Khiladi – Title Track (Remix)	Khiladi 786	Himesh Reshammiya
2012	Hookah Bar	Khiladi 786	Himesh Reshammiya
2012	Hookah Bar (Remix)	Khiladi 786	Himesh Reshammiya
2013	Gore Mukhde Pe Zulfaan Di Chhawan	Special 26	Himesh Reshammiya
2013	Shortcut Romeo (Reprise)	Shortcut Romeo	Himesh Reshammiya
2013	Policegiri	Policegiri	Himesh Reshammiya
2013	Jhoom Barabar Jhoom	Policegiri	Himesh Reshammiya
2014	Koshampa	Kaanchi: The Unbreakable	Ismail Darbar
2014	Kambal Ke Neeche	Kaanchi: The Unbreakable	Ismail Darbar
2014	Har Har Gange	Bhoothnath Returns	Ram Sampath
2014	Har Har Gange (Remix)	Bhoothnath Returns	Ram Sampath
2014	G Pe Danda	Fugly	Prashant Vadhyar
2014	Hum Tumhe Kaise Bataye	Ekkees Toppon Ki Salaami	Ram Sampath
2014	Khelen	Satyamev Jayate (Season 3)	Ram Sampath
2014	Aashiq Mizaaj	The Shaukeens	Hard Kaur
2014	Surmai Sa	LUV...Phir Kabhie	Bubli Haque
2015	Mere Desh Ka Jawab Nahi	Jai Jawaan Jai Kisaan	Rupesh-Girish
2015	Shiv Tandav	Dharam Sankat Mein	Music Designed by Shamir Tandon
2015	Prem Leela	Prem Ratan Dhan Payo	Himesh Reshammiya
2015	Halo Re	Prem Ratan Dhan Payo	Himesh Reshammiya
2015	Dard Da Marham Tu	Prithipal Singh...A Story	Jayant Aryan
2016	Shaukeen Kaminay Title Song	Shaukeen Kaminay	Rajib-Mouna
2016	Bum Me Dum	Shaukeen Kaminay	Rajib-Mouna
2016	Mujhe Tu Jo Mil Gaya	Khel Toh Ab Shuru Hoga	Ashfaque
2016	Danka Bajega	Khel Toh Ab Shuru Hoga	Ricky Mishra
2016	Jaaneman Aah	Dishoom	Pritam
2016	Waqtey Fursat (Male)	My Father Iqbal	Biswajit Bhattacharjee
2016	Dil Me Kayi Armaan	Yeh Hai Judgement Hanged Till Death	Mahesh-Rakesh
2016	Raabta Tujhse Raha	Yeh Hai Judgement Hanged Till Death	Mahesh-Rakesh
2016	Panj Chaske	Dil Sala Sanki	Pramod Panth
2016	Saiyyan	Ek Tera Saath	Ali
2017	Butterfly	Jab Harry Met Sejal	Pritam
2017	Yaad Hai Yaa Bhulte	Sameer	Pankaj Awasthi
2017	Be With It	Call for Fun	Lalit Pandit
2017	1 O'Clock Call	Call for Fun	Lalit Pandit
2017	Dholida	Humein Haq Chahiye Haq Se	Sanjay Pathak
2018	Biwi.com	Biwi.com	Kashi & Richard
2018	Dil Sulagta Ja Raha Hai	Yeh Hai Lollipop	Praveen Bharadwaj
2018	Life Hai Boring	Yeh Hai Lollipop	Praveen Bharadwaj
2018	Party Wali Raat	The Message	Satya Manik Afsar
2018	Aye Khuda	Maal Road Dilli	Atul Sriva Lyrics- Sahil Sultanpuri
2018	Aiyyashian	Game Paisa Ladki	Dev Sikdar
2019	Friends Bhi Family Hain	Hum Chaar	George Joseph
2019	Sexy Kamar	Facebook Wala Pyar	Raja Pandit
2019	Ferari	Sharmaji Ki Lag Gayi	Praveen Bharadwaj
2019	Zinda	Bharat	Julius Packiam & Ali Abbas Zafar
2019	Namo Namo	PM Narendra Modi	Hitesh Modak
2019	Man Ki Bas tu Hi Jaane	Penalty	Prini Siddhant Madhav
2019	Dhundli Hai Zameen	Rescue	Ritesh Yadav, Vivart Rangari
2021	Fiza Mein Tapish	Title song	Raja Ali
2021	Bansuri	Bhavai	Shabbir Ahmed
2021	Mom Ki Gudiya	Bhavai	Shabbir Ahmed
2022	Ijazat	Cinema Zindabad	Raj Prakash Bisen
2022	Pyar se	Love in Ukraine	Nitin Kumar Gupta
2023	Allah De Bande	Gumraah	Mithoon
2023	Poonakalu Loading	Waltair Veerayya (Hindi)	Devi Sri Prasad
2023	Boss Party	Waltair Veerayya (Hindi)	Devi Sri Prasad

=== Regional songs ===
Year	Song	Movie or album	Language	Music director
2013	Speaker	Risky Mundey	Punjabi	Charan Thakur
2014	Hello Nandan	Hello Nandan	Marathi	A.V.Prafullachandra
2014	Meghdhanush Na Saat Chhe Rango	Whisky Is Risky	Gujarati	Samir – Mana
2014	Ranveer Ranveer	Tanko Bhid Gyo	Rajasthani	Iqbal Darbar/Lyrics Sahil Sultanpuri
2016	Yeregaavye Kiri Kiri	Pilibail Yamunakka	Tulu	Kishore Kumar Shetty
2017	Chal Gudd Gudd Gudd Pahiya	Hard Kaur	Punjabi	Bubbles Music
2018	Love U Love U	Pagalpanti	Gujarati	Anwar Sheikh

=== Web series / album songs / singles ===
Year	Song	Web series or album Name	Category	Language	Music director
2013	Sab Teerath Main Pawan Shirdi	Sab Teerath Mein Pawan Shirdi	Album	Hindi	Vivek Asthana
2014	Khelen	Satyamev Jayate (Season 3)	Album	Hindi	Ram Sampath
2016	Tere Ishq Ka Suroor	Tere Ishq Ka Suroor	Album	Hindi	Danish Ali
2017	Harsh Manaye	The Melodious Pamela Jain	Album	Hindi	Kumar Manjul
2017	Tu Lover Mera Mobiler	Tu Lover Mera Mobiler	Album	Hindi	Yogendra Nagda
2017	Hadh (Male Version)	Hadh	Web Series	Hindi	Ankit Shah
2018	Thodi Doori	Thodi Doori	Album	Hindi	Royy
2018	Bhulunga Na Mein	The War of Talent	Album	Hindi	Anand Singh, Nidhi Sharma & Rohit Kumar
2018	Beparwah	Spotlight 2 (web series)	Web Series	Hindi	Ankit Shah
2018	Aao Na	Spotlight 2 (web series)	Web Series	Hindi	Ankit Shah
2018	Dil Ye Dil	Spotlight 2 (web series)	Web Series	Hindi	Ankit Shah
2018	Home Title Track	Home (web series)	Web Series	Hindi	Hitesh Modak
2018	Dhuaa	Smoke (web series)	Web Series	Hindi	Hitesh Modak
2018	Kaatre	White Matter	Web Series	Tamil	Prini Siddhant Madhav
2018	Hua Main Tabaah	White Matter	Web Series	Hindi	Prini Siddhant Madhav
2019	Ishqaa	Ishqaa	Single	Hindi	Royy
2019	Sanson Ki Tarah	Sanson Ki Tarah	Single	Hindi	Gufy
2020	Shukar Ada	Shukar Ada	Single	Punjabi	SunnyVIk
2020	Aadat	Aadat	Single	Punjabi	Teenu Arora
2022	SUGAR Vargi	SUGAR Vargi	Single	Hindi	Zema Music
2022	Aadha Ishq	Aadha Ishq	Web Series	Hindi	Zema Music
2022	Love Is In The Air	Love Is In The Air	Single	Hindi	Mahesh-Rakesh
2022	O Duniya Ke Rakhwale	O Duniya Ke Rakhwale	Single	Hindi	Gourov Dasgupta
2022	Mere Naina Sawan Bhadon	Mere Naina Sawan Bhadon	Single	Hindi	Gourov Dasgupta
2023	Marhaba	Marhaba	Single	Hindi	Sufiyan Bhatt
2023	Bharat Ka Beta	Bharat Ka Beta	Single	Hindi	Bipin Das
2023	Saath Tera	Saath Tera	Single	Hindi	
2023	Vande Mataram 2023	Vande Mataram 2023	Single	Hindi	Semal Nikhil
2023	Allah Janda Ae	Allah Janda Ae	Single	Hindi	Avishek Majumder
2023	Bulleya	Bulleya	Single	Hindi	Avishek Majumder
2024	Shiv Anannt	Shiv Anannt	Single	Hindi	Avishek Majumder
2024	Begairat	Begairat	Single	Hindi	Shabab Azmii
2024	Behtareen	Behatreen	Single	Hindi	Avishek Majumder

=== First solo music video ===
Trikha released his first solo music video "Mahiya Tu Hi Tu" in 2014 under the music label Crescendo Music / Universal Music.
