= Shootout at Lokhandwala =

2007 Indian film directed by Apoorva Lakhia

- Theatrical release poster
- Directed by: Apoorva Lakhia
- Written by: Sanjay Gupta; Suresh Nair; Apoorva Lakhia
- Dialogues by: Raj Vasant
- Produced by: Ekta Kapoor; Sanjay Gupta
- Starring: Amitabh Bachchan; Sanjay Dutt; Suniel Shetty; Vivek Oberoi; Arbaaz Khan; Tusshar Kapoor; Abhishek Bachchan
- Cinematography: Gururaj R. Jois
- Edited by: Bunty Nagi
- Music by: Strings; Anand Raj Anand; Mika Singh; Biddu; Euphoria
- Production companies: Balaji Motion Pictures; White Feather Films
- Distributed by: Raksha Entertainment
- Release date: 25 May 2007
- Running time: 121 minutes
- Country: India
- Language: Hindi
- Budget: ₹18 crore
- Box office: ₹46.04 crore

Shootout at Lokhandwala is a 2007 Indian Hindi-language action thriller film directed by Apoorva Lakhia and produced by Sanjay Gupta and Ekta Kapoor under Balaji Motion Pictures and White Feather Films. Based on the 1991 Lokhandwala Complex shootout, it stars an ensemble cast of Amitabh Bachchan, Sanjay Dutt, Suniel Shetty, Arbaaz Khan, Vivek Oberoi, Abhishek Bachchan, Tusshar Kapoor, and Rohit Roy.

== Overview ==
The film is inspired by the 16 November 1991 Lokhandwala Complex shootout, in which ATS chief Aftab Ahmed Khan led a police operation against gangster Maya Dolas and his associates. Several characters are based on real-life individuals but are portrayed under slightly altered names. The opening caption states that the film is "based on true rumours", reflecting its dramatized interpretation of the events.

== Plot ==
Former Chief Justice Dhingra interviews members of the Bombay Anti-Terrorism Squad (ATS), led by Additional Commissioner of Police Shamsher Khan, ahead of an inquiry into their conduct during the 1991 Lokhandwala shootout. Khan recounts the formation of the ATS, modeled on the Los Angeles Police Department's SWAT units, and its operations against militants and organized crime in Bombay.

The ATS turns its attention to Maya, an ambitious lieutenant of the Dubai-based gangster Dawood Ibrahim who seeks to establish control over Bombay's underworld. After a police informant links Maya's gang to a series of murders, the ATS launches a manhunt. Maya retaliates by targeting the informant's family and resists repeated attempts by the police to secure his surrender through intimidation and bribery.

Maya further escalates the conflict by kidnapping the son of a prominent builder who refuses to recognize his authority. Acting on information from an informant, Khan learns that Maya and his associates are hiding in a flat in the Swati Building at Lokhandwala Complex in Andheri. In November 1991, the ATS surrounds the building with a large police force. During the ensuing gun battle, Maya's gang attempts to escape and seeks assistance from associates in Dubai and corrupt officials, but their efforts fail. Maya and all of his associates are killed in the encounter.

In the present, Dhingra argues before the inquiry that the ATS's actions were justified in combating organized crime. Khan and his officers are subsequently exonerated.

== Cast ==
- Amitabh Bachchan as Dhingra, former Chief Justice
- Sanjay Dutt as ACP Shamsher Khan, Head of Anti-Terrorism Squad (ATS) (based on Aftab Ahmed Khan)
- Suniel Shetty as Inspector Kaviraj Patil, Shamsher's subordinate
- Arbaaz Khan as Head Constable Javed Sheikh, Shamsher's subordinate
- Vivek Oberoi as Maya Dolas
- Tusshar Kapoor as Dilip Buwa, member of Maya's gang
- Rohit Roy as Fatim "Fattu", member of Maya's gang
- Shabir Ahluwalia as RC, member of Maya's gang
- Abhishek Bachchan as Sub-Inspector Abhishek Mhatre (special appearance)
- Dia Mirza as Meeta Mattoo, a journalist
- Amrita Singh as Ratnaprabha Dolas, Maya's mother
- Neha Dhupia as Rohini, Shamsher's wife
- Aditya Lakhia as Doubling, member of Maya's gang
- Ravi Gosain as Aslam Kasai, member of Maya's gang
- Aarti Chabria as Tarranum
- Aftab Ahmed Khan as Commissioner Krishnamoorthy
- Akhilendra Mishra as JCP Tripathi
- Daya Shankar Pandey as Gotiya
- Shrivallabh Vyas as Wadhwani (based on Gopal Rajwani)
- Rakhi Sawant as an actress being interviewed

== Production ==
Several scenes were shot on location at the Lokhandwala Complex in Mumbai.

== Controversy ==
The film attracted controversy over its fictionalised depiction of the 1991 shootout. Several Sikh organisations demanded a ban on the film, alleging that it portrayed Sikhs as terrorists and tarnished the image of the community. The organisations also appealed to Sikhs across the country to oppose the film.

== Soundtrack ==
The soundtrack was composed by Anand Raaj Anand, Strings, Mika Singh, Biddu, and Euphoria.

Shootout at Lokahndwala

Soundtrack album by: Anand Raaj Anand; Strings; Mika Singh; Euphoria; Biddu
- Released: 2007
- Genre: Feature film soundtrack
- Label: T-Series

Track listing
No.	Title	Lyrics	Music	Singer(s)	Length
1.	"Mere Yaar"	Dev Kohli	Anand Raaj Anand	Sunidhi Chauhan, Anand Raaj Anand	05:01
2.	"Aakhri Alvida"	Anwar Maqsood	Strings	Strings	04:39
3.	"Ganpat"	Mika Singh	Mika Singh	Mika Singh	04:29
4.	"Unke Nashe Mein"	Sanjay Gupta	Anand Raaj Anand	Mika Singh, Sukhwinder Singh, Anand Raaj Anand	04:49
5.	"Live By The Gun"	Biddu	Biddu	Biddu	04:22
6.	"Sone De Ma"	Palash Sen	Euphoria	Palash Sen	04:43

== Awards and nominations ==
=== 53rd Filmfare Awards ===
- Nomination: Best Villain – Vivek Oberoi

=== 9th IIFA Awards ===
- Won: Best Villain – Vivek Oberoi
- Won: Best Action – Javed Sheikh and Ejaz

=== 2008 Star Screen Awards ===
- Nomination: Star Screen Award for Best Villain – Vivek Oberoi

=== 2008 Zee Cine Awards ===
- Nomination: Zee Cine Award for Best Actor in a Negative Role – Vivek Oberoi

=== Stardust Awards ===
- Nomination: Stardust Award for Best Actor in a Negative Role – Vivek Oberoi
- Won: Stardust Standout Performance of the Year - Vivek Oberoi
- Nomination: Stardust Award for Best Music Director – Mika Singh
- Nomination: Stardust Award for Best Playback Singer – Mika Singh

=== AXN Action Awards ===
- Won: Best Action film – White Feather Films
- Won: Best Action Actor – Sanjay Dutt
- Won: Best Action Actor in a Negative Role – Vivek Oberoi
- Won: Best Action Sequence – Javed Sheikh and Ejaz

== Prequel ==
Director Sanjay Gupta confirmed a sequel to the film. In early 2012, it was announced that the prequel Shootout at Wadala would star John Abraham, Anil Kapoor, Kangana Ranaut, Tusshar Kapoor, Manoj Bajpayee, and Sonu Sood.

== See also ==
- Maya Dolas
- Dawood Ibrahim
- Aftab Ahmed Khan
