= 1991 Lokhandwala Complex shootout =

1991 shootout between police and gangsters in Mumbai, India

Coordinates: 19.198239°N 72.873702°E

Date	16 November 1991
Location	Lokhandwala Complex, Bombay, Maharashtra, India
Result	Bombay Police victory All gangsters killed by police

Belligerents
Bombay Police; Anti-Terrorism Squad (ATS)	D-Company

Commanders and leaders
ACP Aftab Ahmed Khan	Maya Dolas †; Dilip Buwa †; Anil Pawar †; Ashok Nadkarni †; Gopal Pujari †; Anil Khubchandani †; Vijay Chakur †

Strength
80 to 100 armed policemen (including ATS officers) Up to 500 policemen total	7 gangsters

Casualties and losses
24 police officers wounded	Gangsters: All 7 killed

The 1991 Lokhandwala Complex shootout was a shootout that occurred on 16 November 1991 at the Lokhandwala Complex in Mumbai, India, between seven gangsters led by Maya Dolas and members of the Bombay Police and the Anti-Terrorism Squad (ATS) led by then-Additional Commissioner of Police Aftab Ahmed Khan. The four-hour shootout was dubbed India's "first daylight encounter" and was videographed and conducted in full view of the public. It ended with the deaths of all seven gangsters.

== Background ==
Maya Dolas's mugshot. It was crossed with an "X" after his death, signifying that he was eliminated.

From the early 1960s to late 1970s, criminal enterprises in Bombay were dominated by syndicates controlled by Haji Mastan, Karim Lala, and Varadrajan Mudaliar. In the early 1980s, criminal violence in Mumbai grew as their influence declined. Karim Lala's Pathan Gang, then led by his nephew Samad Khan underwent a brutal gang war with a criminal group led by Shabir Ibrahim Kaskar, who was backed by the police in an effort to bring down the then larger Pathan Gang. Shabir Ibrahim was assassinated on February 12, 1981, by Manya Surve, and his brother Dawood took command, leading to a gradual escalation of violence throughout the 1980s as the latter systematically eliminated his rivals.

By the late 1980s, Bombay's crime world was under the firm control of what became D-Company, headed by Dawood Ibrahim. From his base in Dubai, Ibrahim controlled underworld activities through his various lieutenants. Among the most prominent was Mahindra Dolas, a gangster who was known more popularly by his nickname Maya. Dolas had got his start running several successful extortion rackets for the criminal-politician, Ashok Joshi's gang at Kanjurmarg. On 3 December 1988, Joshi was killed at the Bombay-Pune road near Panvel by a 15-man hit squad led by Chhota Rajan at Ibrahim's orders.

After Joshi's murder, Dolas left the Ashok Joshi gang, and formed his own gang. He then convinced Joshi gang sharpshooter Dilip Buwa to switch sides and together on 17 September 1989, they led a stealth attack against the Joshi gang in Kanjurmarg, in which five people were killed. This followed a failed attempt the previous year prior to Joshis death. This brought them into favour with Ibrahim, who was gunning for the Joshi gang after the killing of his pointman Satish Raje. Dolas and Buwa soon began a steady rise within the ranks of the D-Company. They also conducted extortion activities on Ibrahim's behalf. However, they were also wanted by the police, with active arrest warrants for them. Dolas had in fact escaped from prison a few years prior to the shootout.

== Shootout ==
According to the former Additional Commissioner of Police A. A. Khan, the Anti-Terrorism Squad received a tip-off from an informant that Dolas and his gang were hiding in the A wing, flats no. 002 and 003 in the Swati building at the Lokhandwala Complex, an upper middle class residential complex in suburban Mumbai. The informant reported that they were armed and were waiting for a few builders who would be coming in the evening. The apartment in which they were hiding belonged to Gopal Rajwani, a fugitive from Ulhasnagar and an associate of Ibrahim. The ATS formed three teams for the task of arresting the fugitives and taking them into custody: one was for reconnaissance, while the other two cordoned off the area. The D Company hitmen present in the flat were Dolas, Buwa, Anil Pawar, Ashok Nadkarni, Gopal Pujari, Anil Khubchandani, and Vijay Chakur. The group was armed with two Kalashnikov rifles, three other automatic weapons (an SLR, a 9mm submachine gun, and either another SLR or 9mm), an improvised revolver, and an M1911 pistol.

What happened next is subject to dispute and controversy. According to the official police version, Inspector M. I. Qavi arrived at the gate and spotted Rajwani, who did not recognize Qavi or the other officers due to their plainclothes, but did not arrest him to avoid detection. ATS officers Sunil Deshmukh, Z. M. Gharal Bhanupratap Bharge, and Qavi, along with Inspector Ambadas Pote and two constables, entered the ground-floor flat where the seven gangsters were watching television. The ATS officers were armed with two Sterling submachine guns and a Kalashnikov. When they burst into the flat around 1:30 pm, six of the gangsters, including Dolas, raised their arms in surprise.

According to Qavi, Buwa opened fire on the officers. Sub-Inspector Gharal, who was not wearing body armour, was shot in the chest twice, puncturing his lungs, while Qavi was shot in the elbow and Bharge was lightly wounded in the leg. The others gangsters also joined Buwa in opening fire, while the officers fired back, killing two gangsters in the initial exchange. While the shooting stopped, the wounded officers could not be withdrawn and remained in place for nearly 40 minutes as A. A. Khan arrived with reinforcements. At around 2:00 pm, police again assaulted the flat and killed another gangster, but were driven back by gunfire. Buwa exited the flat and provided covering fire to the other gangsters. While the police officers came out from the front door, the gangsters escaped into the interiors using a second door that led to the stairs.

With the police besieging the complex, Khan, using a loudspeaker, ordered all other residents to take cover and asked the gangsters to surrender. The gangsters proceeded to open fire again, prompting police to respond by firing approximately 450 rounds of ammunition back at them. By 2:45 pm, a crime branch team led by ACP Gobse arrived, hoping to change tactics to crisis negotiation, but Khan refused and intermittent gunfire continued. Around 3:20 pm, the gangsters began firing from the terrace of the building onto police officers below. Firing largely ceased by 4:30 pm, with a final burst of gunfire around 5:15 pm. At the end, all seven gangsters were killed, with the last gangster being shot down at the terrace of the Swati building. Although media coverage claimed Dolas was the main shooter, according to Khan, Dolas spent most of the incident shouting insults inside, while it was Buwa who was firing the most:

"Dolas was just reckless and foul mouthed. Buwa was cold-blooded. Unlike Dolas: nothing could divert Buwa's attention when his fingers were on the trigger. He was a mentor to Chhota Rajan."

Minty Tejpal, a reporter for the news and current affairs video magazine Newstrack, captured the entire shootout live.

== Aftermath ==
The shootout resulted in a great deal of controversy for the ATS. The ATS was suspected of staging a fake encounter and was placed under considerable public and legal scrutiny. A magisterial inquiry was ordered as questions were raised on the use of 450 rounds of ammunition and the need to encounter them during the daytime, when a confrontation and the chance of crossfire were high. The ATS was also charged with seizing Rs 7 million which belonged to Dolas. Petitions alleging corruption were also filed against Khan. However, the trial ended with Khan and other ATS officers being acquitted.

Chhota Rajan, a major Indian criminal figure, was extremely vocal in criticising the police operation as a "fake encounter", claiming it was organized by his former boss Dawood Ibrahim as part of a campaign to downsize Rajan's gang and curtail his power. He further alleged that the coordination for the operation was conducted by Samir Shah, one of Ibrahim's subordinates, and that Dolas was killed despite trying to surrender. Baljeet Parmar, a longtime commentator on organised crime, made similar allegations.

Khan dismissed the allegations as ridiculous, arguing that Dolas and the others were not willing to surrender, citing the live videotaping of the shootout and the fact that a public interest litigation filed over similar allegations was dismissed by the Bombay High Court as "vexatious". He also claimed that, considering the demoralising effect the shootout had on the Bombay underworld (Subash Sawant and Subash Singh Thakur fled to Nepal, while Anil Parab fled to Dubai; all three were major figures in Bombay organized crime), it was justifiable in the end.

While the Lokhandwala shootout made Khan famous, he later faced criticism about the way he handled the Bombay riots under his jurisdiction. The Bharatiya Janata Party and the Shiv Sena protested his alleged partisan attitude towards their workers in the riots. In 1995, when the BJP-Shiv Sena government came to power in Maharashtra, Khan's promotion to the rank of Additional Director General of Police (ADGP) was stalled and he was transferred to Nagpur. Frustrated at this insignificant posting, Khan retired and set up a security agency in 1996, which his son now runs. He also became a politician and joined the Janata Dal, with whom he stood elections in the Mumbai Northwest constituency in 1998.

Gopal Rajwani, the gangster who had inadvertently managed to avoid being caught in the crossfire, returned to Ulhasnagar and joined politics as a Shiv Sena member in 1995. He was eventually shot dead by four of rival mobster Pappu Kalani's henchmen on 24 January 2000 in the premises of the First Class Magistrate's court there.

== In popular culture ==
The shootout was adapted into the 2007 film Shootout at Lokhandwala, starring Sanjay Dutt as ACP Aftab Ahmed Khan, Vivek Oberoi as Maya Dolas, Tushar Kapoor as Dilip Buwa, and Amrita Singh as Maya's mother Ratnaprabha Dolas. The movie also featured the real-life former ACP Aftab Ahmed Khan in a cameo role as his superior, the police commissioner Krishnamurthy.

As the filmmakers were unable to film the shootout scene in the real Swati building, a set worth Rs 5 million was constructed in Film City that mimicked exactly how the area looked in 1991. The film was criticised by Rajan on grounds that it grossly distorted his alleged version of events. In a May 2007 interview with the Times of India, Rajan insisted that the encounter was fake and that the film had falsely presented the shootout per the police's account, and stated he would take his concerns to the film's producer Sanjay Gupta, who did not comment on the matter.
