= Kumar Ailani =

Indian politician

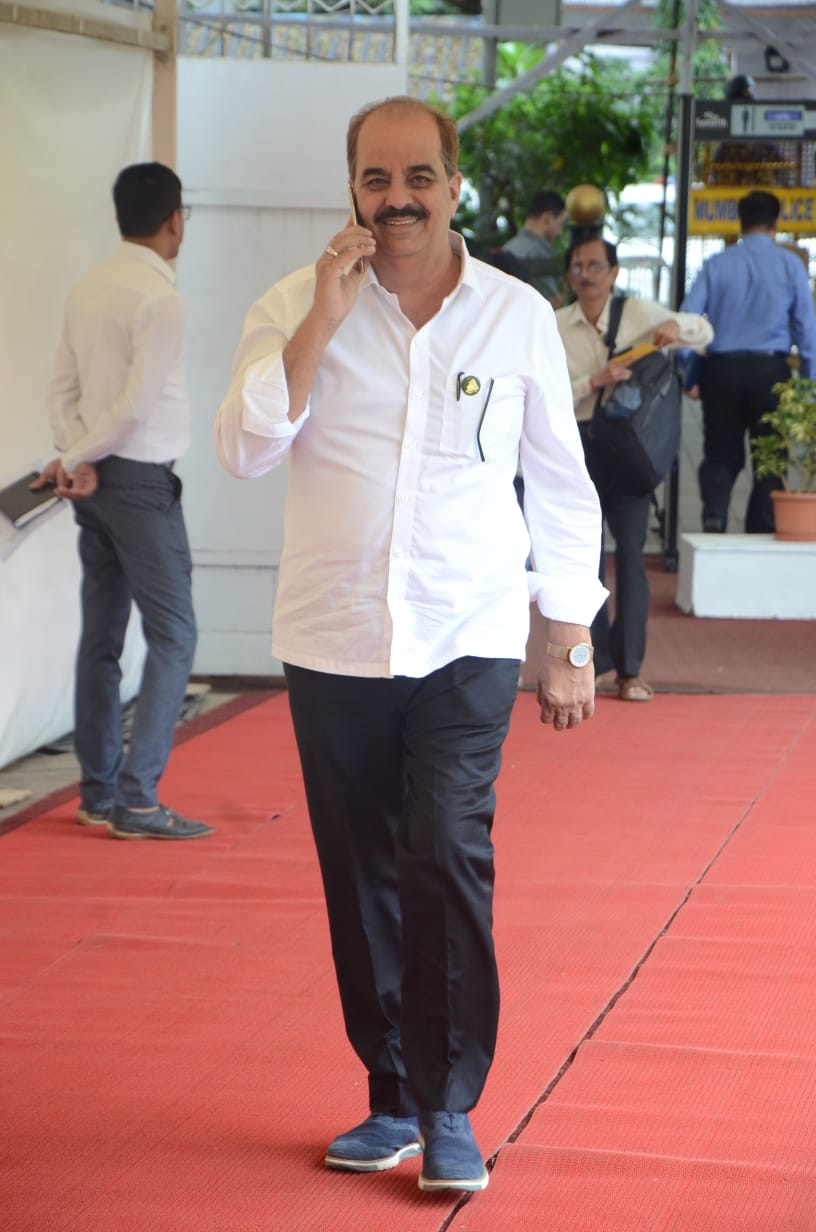

Member of the Maharashtra Legislative Assembly
- Incumbent
- Assumed office 2019
- Preceded by: Jyoti Pappu Kalani
- Constituency: Ulhasnagar
- In office 2009–2014
- Preceded by: Pappu Kalani
- Succeeded by: Jyoti Pappu Kalani

Personal details
- Born: Ulhasnagar
- Party: Bharatiya Janata Party
- Occupation: Politician
- Website: www.mlakumarailan.com

Kumar Uttamchand Ailani is an Indian politician and member of the Bharatiya Janata Party (BJP). Ailani was elected in 2009, 2019 & 2024 to the Maharashtra Legislative Assembly representing the Ulhasnagar 141 constituency.

== Positions held ==
- 2024: Re-Elected to Maharashtra Legislative Assembly (3rd term)
