= Ulhasnagar Assembly constituency =

Constituency of the Maharashtra legislative assembly in India

Coordinates: 19°13′26.90″N 73°07′32.63″E

Ulhasnagar
- Constituency No. 141 for the Maharashtra Legislative Assembly

Constituency details
- Country: India
- Region: Western India
- State: Maharashtra
- District: Thane
- Established: 1957
- Total electors: 283,486

Member of Legislative Assembly
- 15th Maharashtra Legislative Assembly
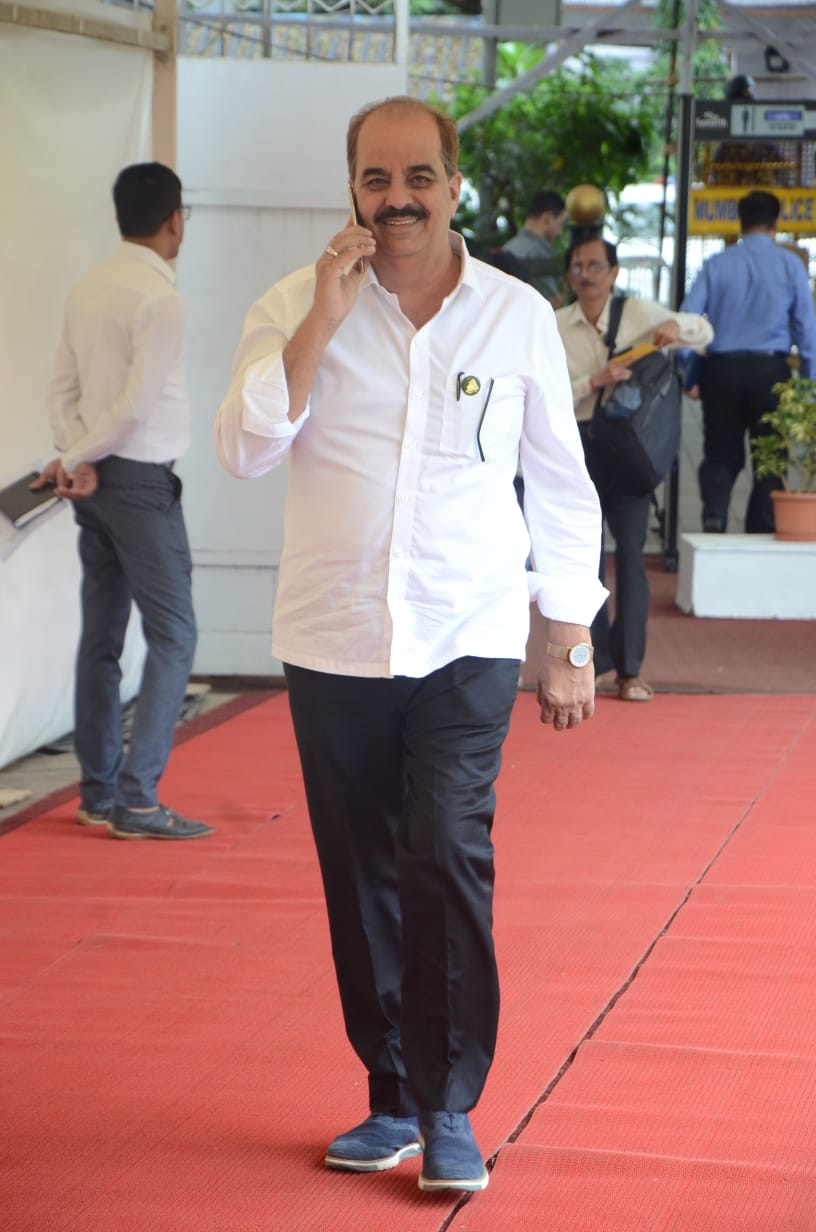
- Incumbent Kumar Ailani
- Party: BJP
- Elected year: 2024

Ulhasnagar Assembly constituency is one of the 288 Vidhan Sabha (Legislative Assembly) constituencies of Maharashtra state in western India. The constituency is dominated by the Sindhi community.

== Overview ==
Ulhasnagar constituency is one of the 18 Vidhan Sabha constituencies located in Thane district. It comprises part of the Ulhasnagar Municipal Corporation and parts of Ulhasnagar and Kalyan tehsils of the district.

Ulhasnagar is part of Kalyan Lok Sabha constituency along with five other Vidhan Sabha constituencies in Thane district, namely, Mumbra-Kalwa, Ambernath, Kalyan East, Kalyan Rural and Dombivali.

== Members of the Legislative Assembly ==
Year	Name	Party
1957	Gurbani Nevandram Vishindas	Indian National Congress
1962	Parcharam Ailani	Socialist Party
1967	Sanmukh Israni	Indian National Congress
1972	Sanmukh Israni	Indian National Congress
1978	Sitaldas Harchandani	Janata Party
1980	Sitaldas Harchandani	Bharatiya Janata Party
1985	Sitaldas Harchandani	Bharatiya Janata Party
1990	Suresh "Pappu" Kalani	Indian National Congress
1995	Suresh "Pappu" Kalani	Independent politician
1999	Suresh "Pappu" Kalani	Independent politician
2004	Suresh "Pappu" Kalani	Republican Party of India
2009	Kumar Ailani	Bharatiya Janata Party
2014	Jyoti Pappu Kalani	Nationalist Congress Party
2019	Kumar Ailani	Bharatiya Janata Party
2024	Kumar Ailani	Bharatiya Janata Party

== Election results ==
=== Assembly Election 2024 ===
2024 Maharashtra Legislative Assembly election : Ulhasnagar
Party	Candidate	Votes	%	±%
BJP	Kumar Uttamchand Ailani	82,231	53.59	▲11.85
NCP-SP	Omie Pappu Kalani	51,477	33.55	New
VBA	Sanjay K Gupta	7,473	4.87	▼0.57
MNS	Bhagwan Shankar Bhalerao	4,969	3.24	New
Independent	Bharat Ramchand Rajwani (Gangotri)	1,821	1.19	New
NOTA	None of the Above	1,759	1.15	▼3.61
Nagrik Vikas Party	Sayani Mannu	1,140	0.74	New
Independent	Adv. Hitesh Jaikishan Jeswani	1,030	0.67	New
Margin of victory		30,754	20.04	▲18.13
Turnout		155,202	54.75	▲7.76
Total valid votes		153,443		
Registered electors		283,486		▲21.50
BJP hold		Swing	▲11.85	

=== Assembly Election 2019 ===
2019 Maharashtra Legislative Assembly election : Ulhasnagar
Party	Candidate	Votes	%	±%
BJP	Kumar Uttamchand Ailani	43,666	41.74	▲7.84
NCP	Jyoti Pappu Kalani	41,662	39.82	▲4.41
Independent	Bhagwan Shankar Bhalerao	8,260	7.90	New
VBA	Sajan Singh Labana	5,689	5.44	New
NOTA	None of the Above	4,978	4.76	▲3.70
BSP	Adv. Rajendra Sahebrao Bhalerao	941	0.90	▼1.45
Independent	Adv. Siddhart R. Sable	705	0.67	New
Margin of victory		2,004	1.92	▲0.41
Turnout		109,632	46.99	▲9.16
Total valid votes		104,623		
Registered electors		233,324		▼28.58
BJP gain from NCP		Swing	▲6.33	

=== Assembly Election 2014 ===
2014 Maharashtra Legislative Assembly election : Ulhasnagar
Party	Candidate	Votes	%	±%
NCP	Jyoti Pappu Kalani	43,760	35.41	New
BJP	Kumar Uttamchand Ailani	41,897	33.90	▼8.48
SS	Bodare Dhananjay Baburao	23,868	19.31	New
Independent	Mohan Ramsingh Kandare	2,976	2.41	New
INC	Adv. Prakash Panjumal Kukreja	2,933	2.37	New
BSP	Gaikwad Sandeep (Bhau) Pandit	2,909	2.35	▼0.23
MNS	Sachin Kadam	1,353	1.09	▼8.30
NOTA	None of the Above	1,308	1.06	New
Margin of victory		1,863	1.51	▼5.55
Turnout		124,944	38.25	▲0.75
Total valid votes		123,586		
Registered electors		326,684		▲13.45
NCP gain from BJP		Swing	▼6.98	

=== Assembly Election 2009 ===
2009 Maharashtra Legislative Assembly election : Ulhasnagar
Party	Candidate	Votes	%	±%
BJP	Kumar Uttamchand Ailani	45,257	42.38	▲4.50
Independent	Suresh @ Pappu Budharmal Kalani	37,719	35.32	New
MNS	Adv.Sambhaji Maroti Patil	10,030	9.39	New
RPI(A)	Raju Rambhau Sonawane	3,699	3.46	New
BSP	Pandye Anil Kumar	2,764	2.59	▼1.93
Peace Party (India)	Sher Jamakhan Jakir Hussen Jakir	1,393	1.30	New
Independent	Hingorani Manish Inder	1,190	1.11	New
Margin of victory		7,538	7.06	▼26.30
Turnout		106,779	37.08	▼0.41
Total valid votes		106,778		
Registered electors		287,964		▼26.18
BJP hold		Swing	▲4.50	

=== Assembly Election 2004 ===
2004 Maharashtra Legislative Assembly election : Ulhasnagar
Party	Candidate	Votes	%	±%
BJP	Kumar Uttamchand Ailani	55,397	37.88	▲8.19
BSP	Karotiya Radhacharan Ramkisan	6,615	4.52	▲2.39
Independent	Sonawane Ramabhau Raju	1,201	0.82	New
Independent	Suresh Alias Pappu Kalani	1,068	0.73	New
JSS	Ramchandra Arjun Patil	976	0.67	New
Margin of victory		48,782	33.36	▼1.04
Turnout		146,270	37.50	▲12.90
Total valid votes		146,241		
Registered electors		390,065		▼3.84
BJP gain from Native People's Party		Swing	▼26.20	

=== Assembly Election 1999 ===
1999 Maharashtra Legislative Assembly election : Ulhasnagar
Party	Candidate	Votes	%	±%
Native People's Party	Suresh @ Pappu Budharmal Kalani	63,931	64.08	New
BJP	Sitaldas Khubchand Harchandani	29,618	29.69	▲8.00
BSP	Shankar Hotchand Panjvani	2,133	2.14	New
Independent	Shekhar Sudhakar Bhalerao	1,686	1.69	New
Independent	Adv. Kamble D. D.	1,441	1.44	New
Independent	Kalani Jyoti Suresh (Pappu)	680	0.68	New
Margin of victory		34,313	34.39	▲0.24
Turnout		102,883	25.36	▼15.95
Total valid votes		99,764		
Registered electors		405,656		▲1.52
Native People's Party gain from Independent		Swing	▲8.24	

=== Assembly Election 1995 ===
1995 Maharashtra Legislative Assembly election : Ulhasnagar
Party	Candidate	Votes	%	±%
Independent	Suresh @ Pappu Budharmal Kalani	90,479	55.84	New
BJP	Mirapuri Teckchand Thanwardas	35,145	21.69	▼5.16
INC	Tolani Ram Assudomal	16,194	9.99	▼59.02
BBM	Khan Jamil Ahamed Juber	14,089	8.70	New
JD	Alex D'Silva	1,106	0.68	▼0.49
Margin of victory		55,334	34.15	▼8.02
Turnout		165,036	41.30	▼18.18
Total valid votes		162,027		
Registered electors		399,597		▲82.40
Independent gain from INC		Swing	▼13.18	

=== Assembly Election 1990 ===
1990 Maharashtra Legislative Assembly election : Ulhasnagar
Party	Candidate	Votes	%	±%
INC	Suresh @ Pappu Budharmal Kalani	88,804	69.02	▲25.51
BJP	Harchandani Sitaldas Khubchand	34,549	26.85	▼17.60
BRP	B. B. More	2,383	1.85	New
JD	Bodha Ashok Ukaram	1,506	1.17	New
Margin of victory		54,255	42.17	▲41.23
Turnout		130,474	59.56	▲4.50
Total valid votes		128,665		
Registered electors		219,079		▲38.39
INC gain from BJP		Swing	▲24.57	

=== Assembly Election 1985 ===
1985 Maharashtra Legislative Assembly election : Ulhasnagar
Party	Candidate	Votes	%	±%
BJP	Harchandani Sitaldas Khubchand	38,159	44.45	▼9.61
INC	Tolani Ram Assudomal	37,354	43.51	New
Independent	Chavan Ramakant Rajun	2,545	2.96	New
Independent	Wagh Damu Namdev	2,106	2.45	New
Independent	Bachhav Ashok Bjikaji	1,886	2.20	New
RPI	Pradhan Daswantrao Sukhdev	1,654	1.93	New
Independent	More Bhanji Bhikari	930	1.08	New
Margin of victory		805	0.94	▼12.72
Turnout		87,118	55.03	▲6.78
Total valid votes		85,853		
Registered electors		158,311		▲15.36
BJP hold		Swing	▼9.61	

=== Assembly Election 1980 ===
1980 Maharashtra Legislative Assembly election : Ulhasnagar
Party	Candidate	Votes	%	±%
BJP	Harchandani Sitaldas Khubchand	35,198	54.06	New
INC(I)	Baharani Gope Varyaldas	26,304	40.40	New
RPI(K)	Sadaphule B. M.	1,736	2.67	New
INC(U)	V. K. Sharma	1,212	1.86	New
Margin of victory		8,894	13.66	▼13.75
Turnout		65,979	48.08	▼14.98
Total valid votes		65,115		
Registered electors		137,228		▲24.04
BJP gain from JP		Swing	▼2.86	

=== Assembly Election 1978 ===
1978 Maharashtra Legislative Assembly election : Ulhasnagar
Party	Candidate	Votes	%	±%
JP	Harchandani Sitaldas Khub Chand	39,309	56.91	New
AIFB	Ailani Parcharam Kewalram	20,379	29.50	▲17.20
Independent	Chandnani Jumdomal Chhugomal	2,479	3.59	New
RPI	Sasane Vithalrao Buhaji	2,452	3.55	▼0.16
Independent	V. J. Shinde	1,571	2.27	New
Independent	Ashok Bhikaji Bachhav	874	1.27	New
Independent	Ulhas Soma Bhalerao	820	1.19	New
Margin of victory		18,930	27.41	▲17.94
Turnout		70,444	63.67	▲10.44
Total valid votes		69,072		
Registered electors		110,635		▼8.23
JP gain from INC		Swing	▲14.26	

=== Assembly Election 1972 ===
1972 Maharashtra Legislative Assembly election : Ulhasnagar
Party	Candidate	Votes	%	±%
INC	Sanmukh Chuharmal Israni	26,735	42.65	▼5.84
ABJS	Pralhad Hiranand Advani	20,803	33.19	▲12.14
AIFB	Parchamal Kevalram Allani	7,713	12.31	New
CPI(M)	P. C. Balkrishnan	3,924	6.26	New
RPI	Vithal Budhaji Sasane	2,324	3.71	New
RPI(K)	Ransi Weiji	525	0.84	New
Margin of victory		5,932	9.46	▼16.89
Turnout		64,357	53.38	▼5.38
Total valid votes		62,681		
Registered electors		120,556		▲35.73
INC hold		Swing	▼5.84	

=== Assembly Election 1967 ===
1967 Maharashtra Legislative Assembly election : Ulhasnagar
Party	Candidate	Votes	%	±%
INC	Sanmukh Chuharmal Israni	24,713	48.49	▲15.9
Independent	P. K. Ailani	11,281	22.14	New
ABJS	P. H. Adwani	10,725	21.04	▲3.69
SSP	D. N. Santani	2,555	5.01	New
Independent	R. V. Rane	1,445	2.84	New
Margin of victory		13,432	26.36	▲19.10
Turnout		53,902	60.69	▼5.96
Total valid votes		50,963		
Registered electors		88,822		▲27.11
INC gain from Socialist Party (India)		Swing	▲8.65	

=== Assembly Election 1962 ===
1962 Maharashtra Legislative Assembly election : Ulhasnagar
Party	Candidate	Votes	%	±%
Socialist Party (India)	Parcharam Kewalram Ailani (Alias Vidyarthi)	17,635	39.84	New
INC	Newandram Vishindas Gurbani	14,425	32.59	▼26.83
ABJS	Prahlad Hiranand Adwani	7,680	17.35	New
RPI	Ransi Velji Sirokha	2,966	6.70	New
Independent	Shivaji Vithal Kharate	881	1.99	New
PSP	Vasdeo Balchand Khanchandani	673	1.52	New
Margin of victory		3,210	7.25	▼26.63
Turnout		46,210	66.13	▼2.61
Total valid votes		44,260		
Registered electors		69,879		▲50.02
Socialist Party (India) gain from INC		Swing	▼19.57	

=== Assembly Election 1957 ===
1957 Bombay State Legislative Assembly election : Ulhasnagar
Party	Candidate	Votes	%	±%
INC	Gurbani Nevandram Vishindas	18,252	59.42	New
CPI	Purswani Salamatrai Jairamdas	7,845	25.54	New
Independent	Ailani Parcharam Kewalram	4,145	13.49	New
Independent	Khubchandani Kishinchand Hassaram	476	1.55	New
Margin of victory		10,407	33.88	
Turnout		30,718	65.95	
Total valid votes		30,718		
Registered electors		46,579		
INC win (new seat)				

== See also ==
- Ulhasnagar
- List of constituencies of Maharashtra Vidhan Sabha
