= Verses of War =

Verses of War is a 2022 Indian War short film directed by Prasad Kadam with Vivek Oberoi and Rohit Roy playing the lead roles.

== Plot ==
The short film "Verses of War" tells the story of an Indian Army officer, Major Bhatia, who is held captive in Pakistan. The plot follows the perspective of a Pakistani Army officer, Captain Nawaz, who travels to India and reads the Major's diary full of romantic poetry. Despite his duty to interrogate the Major, Captain Nawaz begins to develop a liking for him and they slowly develop a strange and unspoken friendship. However, when Captain Nawaz finally reaches Major Bhatia's house in India, he is shocked to learn that Major Bhatia has died, leaving behind a diary with his poetry. Captain Nawaz meets Major Bhatia's widow and gives her the diary, revealing his identity as a Pakistani army officer responsible for Major Bhatia's death. The film ends with Major Bhatia's last poem echoing in the background.

== Cast ==
- Vivek Oberoi as Major Sunil Bhatia
- Rohit Roy as Captain Nawaz
- Shivaanii Rai as Roshni Bhatia
- Lokesh Mittal as Driver

== Awards ==
Best short film, at the Great Indian Film Festival held at Expo 2020 Dubai
