= IIFA Award for Best Performance in a Negative Role =

Indian Film Academy award category

IIFA Best Villain Award
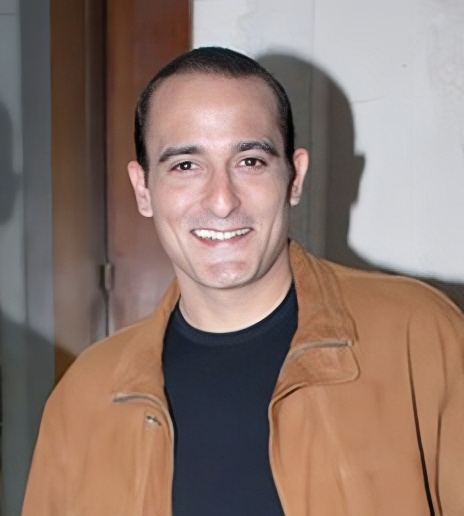
- The 2026 recipient: Akshay Khanna
- Awarded for: Best Performance by an Actor in a Negative Role
- Country: India
- Presented by: IIFA
- First award: Naseeruddin Shah, Sarfarosh (2000)
- Currently held by: Akshay Khanna, Dhurandhar (2026)

The IIFA Best Villain Award is chosen via a worldwide poll and the winner is announced at the ceremony.

Superlatives

Rishi Kapoor and Akshaye Khanna are the only actors to win the award twice.

Naseeruddin Shah and Boman Irani are the only actors nominated 3 times winning once.

Manoj Bajpayee is the only actor nominated 3 times without winning.

Bipasha Basu is the only actress nominated multiple times without winning.

John Abraham, Prakash Raj and Kay Kay Menon are actors nominated twice winning once.

Nana Patekar was also nominated for Best supporting actor the same year.

== Multiple wins ==
Wins	Recipient
3	Akshaye Khanna
2	Rishi Kapoor

== Awards ==
The winners are listed below:-

Year	Actor/Actress	Character Name	Film
2000	Naseeruddin Shah	Gulfam Hassan	Sarfarosh
2001	Sushant Singh	Durga Narayan Chaudhary	Jungle
2002	Akshay Kumar	Vikram Bajaj (Vicky)	Ajnabee
2003	Akshaye Khanna	Karan Malhotra	Humraaz
2004	Feroz Khan	Saba Karim Shah	Janasheen
2005	John Abraham	Kabir	Dhoom
2006	Nana Patekar	Tabrez Alam	Apaharan
2007	Saif Ali Khan	Ishwar 'Langda' Tyagi	Omkara
2008	Vivek Oberoi	Mahindra 'Maya' Dolas	Shootout at Lokhandwala
2009	Akshaye Khanna	Rajiv Singh	Race
2010	Boman Irani	Viru Sahastrabuddhe (Virus)	3 Idiots
2011	Sonu Sood	Chedi Singh	Dabangg
2012	Prakash Raj	Jaikant Shikre	Singham
2013	Rishi Kapoor	Rauf Lala	Agneepath
2014	Rishi Kapoor	DCP Ravikant Phogat	Aurangzeb
2015	Kay Kay Menon	Khurram Meer	Haider
2016	Darshan Kumar	Satbir	NH10
2017	Jim Sarbh	Khalil	Neerja
2024	Bobby Deol	Abrar Haque	Animal
2025	Raghav Juyal	Fani	Kill
2026	Akshay Khanna	Rehman Dakait	Dhurandhar

== See also ==
- IIFA Awards
- Bollywood
- Cinema of India
