= Noida ATS shootout =

2009 crime in India

Noida ATS shooting
- Map of Uttar Pradesh
- Location: Noida, Uttar Pradesh, India
- Date: 24 January 2009
- Attack type: Shooting
- Deaths: 2
- Injuries: 0
- Perpetrator: Anti Terrorist Squad

The Noida ATS shootings took place on 24 January 2009 between 1:00am and 1:30am local time in Noida, Uttar Pradesh, India, two days before the Republic Day of India. The Uttar Pradesh Anti Terrorism Squad officers killed two people, suspected to be Pakistani terrorists in the attack which took place near Noida's Sector 97 area, near Maha Maya college.

== Shootout ==
After receiving a tip-off, ATS agents chased a Maruti 800 car bearing a 'UP' number-plate. During the chase, the terrorists shot at the police officers who retaliated, causing the car to hit the rear tyre of the suspects' car, veering it off the road. ATS officers then took cover behind a roadblock and engaged the terrorists for 30 minutes in a fierce gun-battle. Officer Vinod Kumar sustained a bullet injury during the gunfight. The two terrorists ceased firing after sustaining multiple gunshot wounds and succumbed to their injuries while they were rushed to the hospital. Before their death one of them identified himself as Farooq from Akara and his aide as Abu Ismail from Rawalakot, both in Pakistan.
