= Aftab Ahmed Khan =

IPS officer (1941–2022)

Aftab Ahmed Khan G
- Born: 27 February 1940; Bombay, British India
- Died: 21 January 2022 (aged 81); Mumbai, Maharashtra, India
- Other name: A. A. Khan
- Occupations: Police officer; Politician
- Employer: Indian Police Service
- Organization: Anti-Terrorism Squad

Aftab Ahmed Khan (27 February 1940 — 21 January 2022) was a former Indian police officer (IPS) and politician from Mumbai. He is noted for his encounter killings of gangsters from the Mumbai organized crime syndicates. He is also known as the founder of Anti-terrorism Squad (ATS) in 1990.

== Early life and background ==
His father A.S. Khan had been a noted Public Prosecutor in undivided Hyderabad State and then in Bombay State, practising at the Aurangabad Sessions Court and the High Court.

== Career ==
An officer of the Indian Police Service, Khan was a Deputy Inspector General of Police in Maharashtra state in the 1980s. He shot into fame with the shootout at the Lokhandwala Complex, Andheri, in which seven gangsters including Maya Dolas and Dilip Buwa were killed in 1991.

Khan was commissioned as an IPS officer in 1963 in the Maharashtra Cadre. He served as SDPO (DySP) of Miraj (1965-1967) and Baramati (1967-1968), Addl. SP (HQ) of Ahmednagar District (1968-1969), Addl. SP (Town) Nashik (1969-1971), Acting Commandant in the rank of Addl. SP of SRPF Group II at Pune (1971-1973), SP of Satara District (1973–1975), DCP of Mumbai Police Detection Unit (1975–1977), Commandant of Group VIII at Mumbai (1977–1978), SP of Amravati District (1978–1980), SSP of Thane District in which capacity he was involved in the raising of the Thane Commissionerate as Addl. Commissioner (I) in the rank of SSP and later DIG (1980–1984), DIG (Sector Commander) of CRPF on deputation in Punjab (1984–1986), Joint Director of IB (Haryana) in 1986–1987 on Central Deputation, Addl. CP of Mumbai Police Crime Branch (1987–1989), DIG (State Intelligence Bureau) (1989–1990), Addl. CP (North) (1990–1993) and Jt. Cp (Crime) (1993–1995) of Mumbai Police. He retired 2 years prematurely as ADG (Training) of Maharashtra Police in 1997.

In the mid-1990s, Khan sought to build on his media image by entering politics. Initially expressing interest in joining the Samajwadi Party, he eventually went with the Janata Dal, with whom he stood for elections in the Mumbai North-west constituency in 1998. However, he was unsuccessful.

== Later life and death ==
Khan later helped to run a private security agency that he set up in 1996, along with his son. Following a bout of COVID-19, he died of pneumonia in Mumbai on 21 January 2022, at the age of 81.

== In popular culture ==
In 2007, producer Apoorva Lakhia directed the Bollywood crime film Shootout at Lokhandwala, which was based on the 1991 Lokhandwala Complex shootout led by Aftab Ahmed Khan. Khan was also portrayed in the film as Additional Police Commissioner Shamsher Khan played by Sanjay Dutt. He himself appeared as Commissioner Krishnamurthy in the film as well.

He also played a court judge in 2012's Four Two Ka One.
