= Apoorva Lakhia =

Indian filmmaker

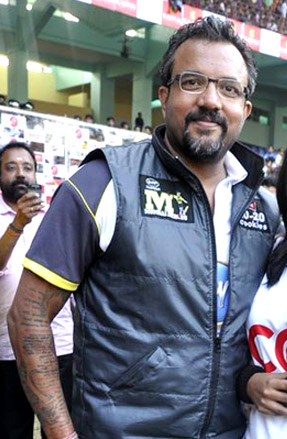
- Lakhia in 2011
- Born: Apoorva Lakhia; Ahmedabad, Gujarat, India
- Occupation: Film director

Apoorva Lakhia is an Indian film director who works in Hindi films.

== Early life ==
Lakhia was born and brought up in Ahmedabad, India. He was educated at the Lawrence School, Sanawar. He dropped out of a filmmaking course in New York University to assist Mira Nair on The Perez Family. He had been an assistant on American films such as The Ice Storm, A Perfect Murder and Addicted to Love.

== Career ==
Before becoming a film director, Apoorva was an assistant director for Ashutosh Gowariker's period epic film Lagaan: Once Upon a Time in India. As Aamir Khan was looking for someone with Hollywood experience for Lagaan, Farhan Akhtar recommended Apoorva, who had worked with casts and crews in Hollywood. He also worked as the second assistant director for the film Kama Sutra: A Tale of Love (1996).

He made his debut as a film director with the 2002 film Mumbai Se Aaya Mera Dost. His second film Ek Ajnabee released in 2005 which starred Amitabh Bachchan and Arjun Rampal in the leading role was a remake of the 2004 American film Man on Fire. His third film Shootout at Lokhandwala which has a multi-star cast released on 25 May 2007 and was based on real-life events involving the underworld gangsters from D-Company such as Maya Dolas and Dilip Buwa. In late 2007, he directed a short story titled Sex on the Beach for the anthology film Dus Kahaniyaan. His next film was Mission Istanbul starring Vivek Oberoi, Sunil Shetty, Shriya Saran and Zayed Khan which released in 2008. North American producer Vikas Kohli of Fatlabs studio collaborated with Mika Singh for the first time on the Mission Istaanbul soundtrack.

He has written the story of Hide & Seek (2009), which is directed Shawn Aranha. Lakhia wrote and directed all the movies from his debut to Mission Istanbul. He made his acting debut with a negative role in the 2010 film Knock Out starring Sanjay Dutt and Irrfan Khan.

In 2013, he directed a remake of the breakthrough film Zanjeer (1973) with Telugu actor Ram Charan; the film was funded by Aaditya Kulshreshtha. In 2017, he directed the film Haseena Parkar based on the life of Dawood Ibrahim's sister with Shraddha Kapoor and her real-life brother Siddhanth Kapoor in the lead roles.

Lakhia is also directing the upcoming war drama Maatrubhumi, starring Salman Khan as an Indian Army officer inspired by the real‑life Colonel B. Santosh Babu, with Chitrangda Singh in a leading role. The film, which is based on the 2020 Galwan Valley clash, began shooting in Ladakh in September 2025 and is targeting a mid‑2026 release, with many key action sequences completed and post‑production underway.

== Filmography ==
Year	Title	Director	Writer	Producer	Note
2001	Lagaan	No	No	No	Assistant director
2003	Mumbai Se Aaya Mera Dost	Yes	Yes	No	
2005	Ek Ajnabee	Yes	Yes	No	
2007	Shootout at Lokhandwala	Yes	Yes	No	
2007	Dus Kahaniyaan	Yes	No	No	Segment: "Sex on the Beach"
2008	Mission Istaanbul	Yes	Yes	No	
2009	Hide & Seek	No	Yes	Yes	
2013	Zanjeer	Yes	Yes	No	Bilingual; Hindi film
2013	Toofan	Yes	Yes	No	Bilingual; Telugu film
2017	Haseena Parkar	Yes	No	No	
2020	Crackdown	Yes	No	Yes	Web series
2020	Mum Bhai	No	Yes	Yes	Web series
2026	Maatrubhumi: May War Rest in Peace †	Yes	No	No	
