= Highway Nights =

Indian drama short film

- Directed by: Shubham S Singh
- Written by: Shivani Mehra
- Produced by: Akhilesh Chaudhary; Shivani Mehra; Shorya Singh; Shubham S Singh; Elisha Kriis
- Starring: Prakash Jha; Mazel Vyas
- Cinematography: Surjodeep Ghosh
- Edited by: Santosh Mandal
- Music by: Advait Nemlekar
- Release date: 2021
- Running time: 20 minutes
- Country: India
- Language: Hindi

Highway Nights is a 2021 Indian drama short film directed by Shubham S Singh. Prakash Jha and Mazel Vyas play the lead roles.

== Premise ==
The plot revolves around a truck driver who gives a lift to a young female sex worker, and learns her story. It is inspired by interviews with sex workers who look for customers along Indian highways.

== Cast ==
- Prakash Jha as Sitaram
- Mazel Vyas as Manju
