= Mission Istaanbul =

Mission Istanbul
- Theatrical release poster
- Directed by: Apoorva Lakhia
- Written by: Suresh Nair; Apoorva Lakhia; Raj Vasant (dialogue)
- Produced by: Ekta Kapoor; Shobha Kapoor; Suniel Shetty; Shabbir Boxwala
- Starring: Vivek Oberoi; Shriya Saran; Zayed Khan; Shabir Ahluwalia; Suniel Shetty; Nikitin Dheer
- Cinematography: Gururaj R. Jois
- Edited by: Chintu Singh
- Music by: Shamir Tandon; Hamza Farooqui; Chirantan Bhatt; Anu Malik; Mika Singh
- Production companies: Balaji Motion Pictures; Popcorn Motion Pictures
- Release date: 25 July 2008
- Running time: 125 minutes
- Country: India
- Language: Hindi

Mission Istaanbul is a 2008 Indian Hindi-language action thriller film directed by Apoorva Lakhia. It stars Vivek Oberoi, Zayed Khan, and Shriya Saran.

The film is based on an organisation Al Johara which bears a resemblance to Qatar-based news channel Al Jazeera, which was criticized by the White House as being an outlet for terrorists. The film deals with the role of Al Johara based in Turkey, a NATO country with troops engaged in Afghanistan, and the role of the Indian Intelligence agency R.A.W.

Released on 25 July 2008, the film was a box-office bomb.

== Plot ==
The story is based on the life of India's top news reporter Vikas Sagar. He would do anything for his news report, even risk his life. Ambitious, popular, and professional, Vikas is considered one of the most promising journalists in the business. Due to this reason, Owais Hussain, a senior producer at the controversial news channel Al Johara, offers him a job as the head of the channel's India bureau. Vikas is going through a divorce with his wife Anjali, and getting his mind off things, Vikas accepts the offer and flies to Istanbul to start work for Al Johara. Vikas then meets Dr. Lisa Lobo, at a party, who is headed to Istanbul to attend a medical convention. It is later revealed that Lisa is a R.A.W. agent looking forward to recruiting Vikas.

Once in Istanbul, Vikas meets with the head of Al Johara, Ghazni, who has business interests all over the world but whose obsession these days is Al Johara as an instrument to shape world events. There is only one word of caution to Vikas, and that's never ever to venture onto the 13th floor known as the Catacomb. He once again meets Owais, who tells him that he is looking forward to quitting his job and settling down with his Irish girlfriend. Ghazni sends Vikas and Owais on an assignment to cover kidnapped journalists in one of terrorist Abu Nazir's terrorist-camps in Afghanistan.

The two meet Abu Nazir's brother, Khalil, who tries to scare Vikas by killing one of the kidnapped journalists and is later revealed to be Ghazni's right hand. Vikas, shocked, takes action and fights Khalil's thugs. Khalil then shoots Owais multiple times leading to his death. Vikas jumps on a helicopter and rides away, seeing Owais get killed. Reeling at this close encounter with terrorism and watching a brutal killing, Vikas arrives in Istanbul in a daze. Ghazni finds out about Owais' death and holds a funeral. At the funeral, Vikas is approached by a former Turkish commando, Rizwan Khan, who hints that no senior employee has ever quit Al Johara and rattles off a list of Al Johara employees who had been killed in terrorist attacks within days of there being of rumours of their plans to quit or their resumes circulating in the job market.

Vikas remembers Owais telling him that he wants to quit his job. This makes Vikas suspicious about Al Johara being connected to terrorism. Before asking any more questions, Rizwan Khan disappears. Vikas discreetly runs a check on the names rattled off by Rizwan and discovered he was indeed telling the truth. Five Al Johara reporters before Owais had either died in a car bomb explosion, abducted and killed or simply found dead. He slowly notices that not everything is as simple as it looks in the offices of Al Johara, especially when he seems to bump into strangers whose faces he soon recognizes as suicide bombers in a couple of terrorist attacks. Vikas, confused, accidentally goes to the forbidden 13th floor of the building and is tortured by Al Johara's staff. Lisa arrives and saves him by taking him away. Vikas goes back to his apartment only to find his passport, documents and money all missing. Later on, while buying a falafel roll, he finds a note in his pocket telling him he is being followed by Ghazni's men. While running from Ghazni's men, Vikas bumps into Rizwan, who tells him he is being tracked wherever he goes and what he does, so then Rizwan beats up Ghazni's men and removes the trackers. Rizwan tells Vikas that Abu Nazir is actually dead but being kept alive by Al Johara through videotapes by using digital images of the terrorist and doctoring old footage because the man who killed Abu Nazir was indeed Rizwan himself as he had lost his family in a blast.

Rizwan and Vikas plan to expose Al Johara by breaking into the 13th floor. First, they break the hands of a man who Vikas had seen authorising the special lift. Rizwan shoots numerous guards on his way to the 13th floor while covering Vikas. Once they reach the 13th floor, Vikas finds out the truth about how Al Johara helps terrorism increase and what they do and saves it on a pen drive while subsequently erasing the data and leaving a virus on Al Johara's computers. At the same time, Rizwan is covering Vikas by shooting any guards that come their way. Lisa helps them escape the Al Johara building and tells them that she informed Ghazni about Vikas' activities earlier so that he could trust her, but actually, she is working for RAW. Ghazni sends his men to get the pen drive back, but his men are brutally beaten up by Vikas, Rizwan and Lisa. Ghazni kills Zahir (a man that came to retrieve the pen drive) and frames the trio for the murder and putting a bounty on their heads.

Vikas calls Anjali, who tells him that she is coming to Istanbul to pick him up. This call allows Ghazni to track Vikas, and hence he and Rizwan are forced to fend off the police. Rizwan disappears, while Vikas is repeatedly chased by cops but manages to escape. On one occasion, he meets the Indian Ambassador and tries to tell her the truth, but she does not seem to believe him because Ghazni is a very respected man in Turkey. While escaping, Vikas runs into Rizwan, who takes him to the airport where Anjali is coming. Rizwan forces Vikas to let Anjali to go with Ghazni and his men because his informants are everywhere, and Vikas will probably get killed by Ghazni if he is spotted. Rizwan realises that Lisa has not yet called them and hence goes to her house with Vikas only to find her killed by Khalil. While dying, she gives her boss' contact to them, but by the time Vikas and Rizwan get there, he too is dead. Vikas then meets Ghazni and his men who are holding Anjali hostage. Anjali is tortured by Ghazni, and his men, and so is Vikas, especially when he refuses to give the pen drive. Eventually, he gives it to them because Khalil was about to shoot Anjali. After the pen drive download was complete, Khalil attempts to kill Vikas and Anjali, but an explosive fitted by Rizwan blows up, allowing Vikas to free himself. Vikas and Ghazni engage in a lengthy fight as well as Rizwan and Khalil, where Vikas and Rizwan manage to kill off their opponents. In the end, Vikas and Anjali are reunited, and Rizwan unexpectedly turns up at their place.

== Cast ==
- Vivek Oberoi as Rizwan Khan, Vikas' friend at Istanbul and a former Turkish commando
- Zayed Khan as Vikas Sagar, A journalist and Anjali's husband
- Shriya Saran as Anjali Sagar, Vikas' wife
- Nikitin Dheer as Al Ghazni, head of Al Johara
- Shabbir Ahluwalia as Khalil Nazir, Abu Nazir's brother, Ghazni's right hand and the main antagonist
- Suniel Shetty as Owais Hussain (special appearance)
- Shweta Bhardwaj as Dr. Liza Lobo, an undercover RAW agent in Istanbul
- Brent Mendenhall as President George W. Bush
- Khalil Ahmed as Osama bin Laden

Additionally, politician Omar Abdullah appeared as himself. Abhishek Bachchan made a special appearance in the item number "Nobody Like You." Turkish ballet dancer Tanyeli appeared in the song "World Hold On."

== Soundtrack ==
Mission Istaanbul

Soundtrack album by Anu Malik Shamir Tandon Hamza Farooqui Mika Singh Chirantan Bhatt
- Released: 2008
- Genre: Feature film soundtrack
- Label: T-Series

The soundtrack was composed by Mika Singh, Hamza Farooqui, Chirantan Bhatt, Shamir Tandon and Anu Malik. The album consists of 9 songs, including 3 remix versions.

=== Track listing ===
Title	Singer(s)	Music	Lyrics	Length
"World Hold On"	Kunal Ganjawala, Gayatri Ganjawala, Raaj	Shamir Tandon	Shabbir Ahmed	05:12
"Mission Mission"	Hamza Farooqui	Chirantan Bhatt	Hamza Farooqui	03:57
"Jo Gumshuda"	Shaan, Mahalakshmi Iyer, Ege	Anu Malik	Sameer	05:37
"Nobody Like You"	Neeraj Shridhar, Anoushka, Ishq Bector	Chirantan Bhatt	Hamza Farooqui	03:45
"Ek Baat Kahu Dildara"	Zubeen Garg, Sunidhi Chauhan	Anu Malik	Sameer	05:21
"Apun Ke Saath"	Mika Singh, Priya Nayar, Vikas Kohli	Mika Singh	Mika Singh & Virag Mishra	04:06
"Jo Gumshuda" (Remix)	Shaan, Mahalakshmi Iyer, Ege	Anu Malik	Sameer	03:51
"Nobody Like You" (Remix)	Neeraj Shridhar, Anoushka, Ishq Bector	Chirantan Bhatt	Hamza Farooqui	03:26
"World Hold On" (Remix)	Kunal Ganjawala, Gayatri Ganjawala, Raaj	Shamir Tandon	Shabbir Ahmed	05:11

== Reception ==
=== Critical reception ===
Mission Istaanbul received negative reviews from critics. Taran Adarsh of Bollywood Hungama gave it 1.5 out of 5, writing, "On the whole, MISSION ISTAANBUL rests on action and only action to salvage the show. But that's not enough. At the box-office, this mission won't work!" Elvis D'Silva of Rediff.com gave it 1 out of 5, writing. "Sequences, set pieces and plot devices are liberally sourced from such Hollywood fare as Enemy Of The State, The Siege, The Matrix, Swordfish and the Hong Kong actioner Infernal Affairs. The rest apparently came from the fertile imaginations of the director and writer Suresh Nair. One of which would be the blatant product and tagline placement for a fizzy drink done so horribly badly that I, for one, am never going to be able to pick up a can of the stuff again.

=== Box office ===
Mission Istaanbul grossed ₹9.34 crore (US$970,000) worldwide.
