= Lokhandwala Complex =

Lokhandwala
- Neighbourhood
- Location within Mumbai
- Coordinates: 19.130815°N 72.82927°E
- Country: India
- State: Maharashtra
- District: Mumbai Suburban
- City: Mumbai

Government
  - Type: Municipal Corporation
  - Body: Brihanmumbai Municipal Corporation (MCGM)
- Time zone: UTC+5:30 (IST)
- PIN: 400053
- Area code: 022
- Vehicle registration: MH-02

Lokhandwala Complex, also known as Lokhandwala, is a large, upmarket, and affluent residential and commercial neighbourhood in the Andheri West suburb in Mumbai, India. It is approximately 5 km from the Andheri station. The name "Lokhandwala" comes from the name of the developer, Lokhandwala Constructions Pvt. Ltd. It was the primary developer of the suburb of Versova, which was previously a marshland. It is also the starting point of Line 6 of the city's metro system.

== Lokhandwala Complex shootout ==
Lokhandwala Complex featured in the news headlines when, on 16 November 1991, then Additional Commissioner of Police (ACP) Aftab Ahmed Khan, head of the ATS, led a force of 100 police and ATS officers and engaged in a firefight with seven gangsters who were present in the Swati building within the complex. In the ensuing shootout, which lasted four hours, about 450 rounds were exchanged, and all seven gangsters were killed, including Maya Dolas, Dilip Buwa,, and Anil Pawar.

This event was the basis for the 2007 Hindi film Shootout at Lokhandwala. The movie starred Sanjay Dutt as ACP Aftab Ahmed Khan, Vivek Oberoi as Maya Dolas, Tushar Kapoor as Dilip Buwa, and Amrita Singh as Maya's mother, Ratnaprabha Dolas, The movie also featured the real-life former ACP Aftab Ahmed Khan in a cameo role as his superior, the Police Commissioner S. Ramamurthy.
