= Wake Up India =

- Movie Poster
- Directed by: Babloo Seshadri
- Story by: Mohammed Salim
- Produced by: Anjula Singh Mahor; Ashok Kaushik; Vinay Singh
- Starring: Sai Tamhankar; Manoj Joshii; Anjjan Srivastav; Mukesh Tiwari; Mohan Joshi; Milind Gunaji; Anant Jog; Adi Irani; Mushtaq Khan; Atul Parchure; Asrani; Elisha Kriis
- Cinematography: R.R. Prince
- Edited by: Babloo Seshadri
- Music by: Shankar Sahney
- Production companies: Kanishka Films; Shree Balajee Entertainment
- Release date: 25 October 2013
- Running time: 130 minutes (Approximately)
- Country: India
- Language: Hindi

Wake Up India is a 2013 Indian Hindi-language political drama film written and directed by Babloo Seshadri. It is produced by Shree Balajee Entertainment in association with Kanishka Films. Starring Sai Tamhankar, Manoj Joshi, Mukesh Tiwari, Mohan Joshi, Asrani, and Elisha Kriis. The film was released on 25 October 2013. The Times of India stated that "the issues raised here are valid but the execution is immature." The film raised valid questions about the growth and development of the nation and the hostile behavior of the political parties involved.

== Cast ==
- Sai Tamhankar
- Manoj Joshi
- Aanjjan Srivastav
- Elisha Kriis as Supriya
- Mukesh Tiwari
- Mohan Joshi
- Milind Gunaji
- Anant Jog
- Adi Irani
- Mushtaq Khan
- Atul Parchure
- Asrani
- Anjula Singh Mahor
