= Zanjeer (2013 film) =

2013 Indian film by Apoorva Lakhia

- Theatrical release poster of Hindi version
- Directed by: Apoorva Lakhia
- Screenplay by: Suresh Nair; Apoorva Lakhia
- Story by: Apoorva Lakhia
- Based on: Zanjeer (1973) by Salim–Javed
- Produced by: Puneet Prakash Mehra; Sumeet Prakash Mehra; Reliance Entertainment
- Starring: Ram Charan; Priyanka Chopra; Sanjay Dutt (Hindi); Srihari (Telugu); Prakash Raj; Atul Kulkarni; Mahie Gill
- Cinematography: Gururaj R. Jois
- Edited by: Chintu Singh
- Music by: Songs: Anand Raj Anand; Meet Bros Anjjan; Chirantan Bhatt; Score: Gaurang Soni
- Production companies: Reliance Entertainment; Prakash Mehra Productions; Rampage Motion Pictures; Flying Turtles
- Distributed by: Reliance Entertainment
- Release date: September 6, 2013 (India)
- Running time: 138 minutes
- Country: India
- Languages: Hindi; Telugu

Zanjeer (transl. Shackles) is a 2013 Indian crime action film directed by Apoorva Lakhia. A remake of the 1973 cult classic of the same name, the film stars Ram Charan, Priyanka Chopra, Sanjay Dutt, Prakash Raj, Atul Kulkarni, and Mahie Gill. The film was shot simultaneously in Hindi and Telugu, the latter titled Thoofan (transl. Storm) with Srihari replacing Dutt. This also marks Charan's Hindi cinema debut as well as Chopra's Telugu cinema debut and her second South Indian film after her debut film, Thamizhan (2002).

The film was released on 6 September 2013, and received widespread negative reviews from critics, emerging as a major box office failure. Critics panned the film for doing injustice to the iconic 1973 original, criticising weak screenplay, uninspiring direction and stiff performance by lead actor Ram Charan.

== Plot ==
Vijay Khanna is an Assistant Commissioner of Police. He is an dedicated officer. He is frequently transferred because he does not accept corruption in the underworld. He is haunted by the murder of his parents, on his birthday. He still remembers a man in a black raincoat who was part of the crime.

Vijay is assigned a case involving the brutal murder of a district collector. The key eyewitness, Mala, has seen Teja's gang commit the crime but is initially unwilling to cooperate. Teja, the head of a powerful oil mafia, wants Mala eliminated. Vijay persuades Mala to testify, which puts her life in danger. To protect her, he shelters her in his home, and over time, they fall in love. One time they had up having sex.

During his investigations, Vijay encounters Sher Khan, a dealer in illegal cars. Impressed by Vijay's integrity, Sher Khan reforms and becomes a staunch ally, vowing to support Vijay. Vijay also meets Jaydev, a reporter who initially criticises him but later admires Vijay's dedication and provides valuable information about the oil mafia.

Vijay arrests Kataria, a member of Teja's gang, who reveals the mafia's operation of stealing petrol and oil, mixing it with kerosene, and smuggling it. However, Kataria is murdered while in custody, casting doubt on Vijay's progress. Vijay learns about Prashant Khanna, a man killed by Teja years ago, and starts connecting the dots. Despite setbacks, including his suspension from the police force, Vijay vows to dismantle Teja's empire by his own means.

Vijay begins to systematically destroy Teja's oil refineries, despite Mala's concerns about the potential dangers. One evening, while dining out, Vijay is ambushed by Teja's men. He kills them and warns Teja that even his entire gang won't be able to stop him. Teja responds by sending more men to attack Vijay and Mala, but with the timely intervention of Sher Khan, they manage to survive.

Teja mocks Vijay at the hospital, prompting Mala to urge Vijay to end Teja's reign of terror. Shortly after, Teja's men, led by his trusted lieutenant Bosco, murder Jaydev, causing widespread panic. Sher Khan uncovers evidence implicating Inspector Saalwe and Bosco in Kataria's murder, carried out on Teja's orders. With this information, the commissioner declares Teja a wanted criminal and reinstates Vijay.

Teja flees to an old mine with his accomplice Mona, but Vijay tracks them down. During their confrontation, Vijay recognises a tattoo on Teja's arm, realising he is his parents' murderer.

Teja admits to killing Prashant Khanna, Vijay's father, because Prashant had filed a case against him. Enraged, Vijay viciously beats Teja, ultimately killing him by causing an explosion. In the aftermath, the government seizes Teja's wealth and implicates Mona in his crimes. The film concludes with Sher Khan and Mala visiting Vijay at the police station. Mala prepares a meal for Vijay, who smiles at Sher Khan as a new drug mafia case appears on television, ready for his next battle.

== Cast ==
- Ram Charan Teja as ACP Vijay Khanna (dubbed by Viraj Adhav in Hindi)
- Priyanka Chopra as Mala
- Sanjay Dutt (Hindi) / Srihari (Telugu) as Sher Khan
- Prakash Raj as Rudra Pratap Teja
- Elisha Kriis as Shital
- Mahie Gill as Mona Darling
- Atul Kulkarni (Hindi) / Tanikella Bharani (Telugu) as Jayadev
- Ankur Bhatia as Bosco
- Bikramjeet Kanwarpal as Kataria
- Daya Shankar Pandey as Inspector Prem
- Charanpreet Singh as Vilas (Informer)
- Chetan Pandit as Police Commissioner
- Apoorva Lakhia as Ship Captain (uncredited)
- Taran Bajaj as Singh (Hindi version)
- Kavita Kaushik as an item number in the song "Shakila Banoo" / "Shakila Scentu"

== Production ==
=== Casting ===
Apoorva Lakhia cast Telugu actor Ram Charan Teja and Priyanka Chopra in the lead roles. Prakash Raj was roped in to play the character of Rudra Pratap Teja. There were reports that Sonu Sood and Arjun Rampal were being considered for the role of Sher Khan. It was also reported that Sanjay Dutt was cast for the role. In September 2012, The Times of India reported that both Arjun Rampal and Sanjay Dutt opted out citing date issues and the makers had finalised Sonu Sood for the role. Later Sanjay Dutt was chosen to play the character in the Hindi version, while Srihari portrayed the same character in the Telugu version. Bindu's iconic 'Mona Darling' act was taken over by Mahi Gill, after talks with actresses Jacqueline Fernandez, Mallika Sherawat and Malaika Arora Khan fell through. Atul Kulkarni was seen in a new role in this film. After Sonu Sood was injured in the CCL match playing for Mumbai Heroes, he was replaced with Srihari for the Sher Khan role in Thoofan. Popular TV artist Kavitha Kaushik was roped in for a special song in the movie. Zanjeer's script cost ₹6 crore (US$620,000) and was re-bought by Apoorva Lakhia.

=== Filming ===
The Telugu version of the film was titled as Thoofan. Priyanka Chopra charged a fee of ₹9 crore (US$930,000) while Charan charged a fee of ₹12 crore (US$1.2 million). A 25-day schedule in Hyderabad, Andhra Pradesh took place from 14 November to 5 December 2012.

== Marketing and release ==
The first look and theatrical trailer of Zanjeer (Hindi version) were released on 4 July 2013. The dubbing process started from 26 March 2013, where Sanjay Dutt plays the role played by Srihari. Sanjay Dutt finished Zanjeer filming − with only a few days left at his disposal before returning to jail. One of India's leading male voice artist Viraj Adhav dubbed the voice of Ramcharan. Zanjeer in US by BlueSky. The first look and official theatrical trailer of Thoofan (Telugu version) were launched by Reliance Entertainment on its YouTube Official Channel on 25 March 2013 featuring Ram Charan Teja, Priyanka Chopra, Prakash Raj and Srihari. Zanjeer's worldwide distribution rights were bought by Reliance BIG Entertainment for ₹105 crore (US$11 million). The Telugu version was then dubbed and released in Tamil during January 2017 as Super Police.

Zanjeer/Thoofan was released in 2,085 theatres in India and 3550 theatres worldwide.

== Soundtrack ==
Zanjeer

Soundtrack album by: Anand Raj Anand; Meet Bros Anjjan; Chirantan Bhatt
- Released: 12 August 2013
- Recorded: 2013
- Genre: Feature film soundtrack
- Length: 32:28
- Language: Hindi
- Label: T-Series
- Producers: Anand Raj Anand; Meet Bros Anjjan; Chirantan Bhatt

All lyrics are written by Manoj Yadav and Shabbir Ahmed.

Hindi Sound-Track
No.	Title	Music	Singer(s)	Length
1.	"Mumbai Ke Hero"	Chirantan Bhatt	Mika Singh, Talia Bentson	4:40
2.	"Pinky"	Meet Bros Anjjan	Mamta Sharma, Meet Bros Anjjan	4:11
3.	"Lamha Tera Mera"	Chirantan Bhatt	Wajhi Farooki, Palak Muchhal	5:03
4.	"Khochey Pathan Ki Zubaan (Qawaali)"	Meet Bros Anjjan	Sukhwinder Singh, Shabab Sabri, Meet Bros Anjjan	6:15
5.	"Kaatilana"	Meet Bros Anjjan	Shweta Pandit	5:03
6.	"Shakila Banoo"	Anand Raj Anand	Shreya Ghoshal	3:43
7.	"Kaatilana" (Club Mix)	Meet Bros Anjjan	Shweta Pandit, Meet Bros Anjjan	3:33
Total length:				32:28

Thoofan

Soundtrack album by: Anand Raj Anand; Meet Bros Anjjan; Chirantan Bhatt
- Released: 27 August 2013
- Recorded: 2013
- Genre: Feature film soundtrack
- Length: 21:17
- Language: Telugu
- Label: T-Series
- Producers: Anand Raj Anand; Meet Bros Anjjan; Chirantan Bhatt

All lyrics are written by Chandrabose.

Telugu Sound-Track
No.	Title	Music	Singer(s)	Length
1.	"Mumbai Ke Hero"	Chirantan Bhatt	Ram Charan, Jaspreet Jasz, Roshni Baptist	4:38
2.	"Pinkie"	Meet Bros Anjjan	Mamta Sharma	4:10
3.	"Preminchaa.."	Chirantan Bhatt	Mynampati Sreerama Chandra, Shalmali Kholgade	3:43
4.	"Vechchanaina"	Meet Bros Anjjan	Shweta Pandit	5:03
5.	"Shakila Scentu"	Anand Raj Anand	Shreya Ghoshal	3:43
Total length:				21:17

== Reception ==
The film received mixed to negative reviews from the critics. Taran Adarsh of Bollywood Hungama gave the film 3/5 writing, "The new Zanjeer borrows from the original, but it is more of an updated avatar of that film. On the whole, Zanjeer is a triumph for Ram Charan, who gets abundant opportunity to exhibit his talent and scores exceedingly well. However, the film comes across as a regular masala fare that caters to the single screen spectator mainly and also for enthusiasts of typical Bollywood entertainers." Meena Iyer of The Times of India gave the film 3/5 writing "Yet, this film should be judged as a stand-alone offering because attempts to compare the two versions will find the current one falling short, especially in the dialogue and music departments. Ram Charan, as the brooding policeman, excels in action. His dark eyes with long lashes adeptly convey anger. Sanjay Dutt is competent and lovable."

Karan Anshuman of the Mumbai Mirror gave a 1.5 star rating writing "If Salim-Javed do watch this film, one wouldn't be surprised if they decided to give the money and 'core story' credit back and disassociate themselves from this embarrassment of a "remake". Anupama Chopra termed the film 'a ramshackle remake' and wrote, "This remake is wrong on so many levels that I don't know where to begin. This isn't a film. It's sacrilege."

Raja Sen of Rediff.com gave a zero star rating calling it was an unforgivably bad remake. Shubra Gupta of The Indian Express said "It's neither faithful remake nor campy, knowing tribute. It's just a poor copy". Rajeev Masand of IBN-live gave 0/5 stars saying "The new 'Zanjeer' isn't just a bad film, it's a shameless exercise in laziness."

India Today – "Zanjeer makes it to the list of the worst films ever made". Times of Oman – "It would be a sin to compare this lazy attempt to the original. Even as a standalone film, it fails miserably".

MSN India – "Thoofan is like paying money to dig your own grave." Sunday Guardian – "Two and a half hours of uninterrupted idiocy".
