= AXN Action Awards =

- Awarded for: Best in Action film
- Country: India
- Presented by: AXN
- First award: 2006

AXN Action Awards, has tied up with Thums Up to create a platform to give ‘Action’ stars credit through the first on-air Action Award event in India.

== History ==
The first awards were presented in 2006. The awards given are different five categories. The winner is selected by public vote.

== Awards ==
=== Best Action film ===
Year	Film	Producer/Productions
2006	Dus	Karma Entertainment
2007	Krrish	Rakesh Roshan
2008	Shootout at Lokhandwala	Ekta Kapoor, Balaji Motion Pictures; White Feather Films
2009	Jodha Akbar	Ashutosh Gowariker
2010	Wanted	Boney Kapoor
2011	Dabangg	Arbaaz Khan

=== Best Action Director ===
Year	Director	Film
2006	Anubhav Sinha	Dus
2007	Farhan Akhtar	Don: The Chase Begins Again
2008	Anurag Kashyap	Black Friday
2009	Murugadoss	Ghajini
2010	Vishal Bhardwaj	Kaminey
2011	Abhinav Kashyap	Dabangg

=== Best Action Actor ===
Year	Actor	Film
2006	Akshay Kumar	Waqt: The Race Against Time
2007	Shahrukh Khan	Don: The Chase Begins Again
2008	Sanjay Dutt	Shootout at Lokhandwala
2009	Hrithik Roshan	Jodhaa Akbar
2010	Salman Khan	Wanted
2011	Salman Khan	Dabangg

=== Best Action Actor in a Negative Role ===
Year	Actor	Film
2006	Rahul Dev	Insan
2007	Hrithik Roshan	Dhoom 2
2008	Vivek Oberoi	Shootout at Lokhandwala
2009	Imran Khan	Kidnap
2010	Akshay Kumar	Blue
2011	Sonu Sood	Dabangg

=== Best Action Sequence ===
2006	Allan Amin	Dus
2007	Allan Amin	Dhoom 2
2008	Javed Sheikh and Ejaz	Shootout at Lokhandwala
2009	Peter Hein	Ghajini
2010	Vijayan Master	Wanted
2011	Vijayan Master	Dabangg

== Records ==
- Most award to a single action film
  - Dabangg (2010) - 5
  - Shootout at Lokhandwala (2007) - 4
  - Wanted (2009) - 3
- Most action actings awards (Best Action Actor + Best Actor in a Negative Rola)
  - Salman Khan - (2+0) = 2
  - Akshay Kumar - (1+1) = 2
  - Hrithik Roshan - (1+1) = 2
- Most action sequence awards
  - Allan Amin - 2
  - Vijayan Master - 2
