= Gopal Rajwani =

Indian politician and mobster

Gopal Rajwani (died 25 January 2000) was a criminal-politician with the Shiv Sena party, from Ulhasnagar, Maharashtra (a suburb of Mumbai). Formerly associated with the ganglord Dawood Ibrahim, he joined the Shiv Sena in 1996. He was killed while appearing for a court case at Ulhasnagar in January 2000.

== Life ==
Rajwani began his life selling papadums in Ulhasnagar. At one point, he met gangster Govind Vachani and rose rapidly in the crime world. He later joined the criminal-politician Pappu Kalani and was arrested in 1982–83 for the murder of the editor A V Narayan of Blitz magazine. The case could not be sustained, as no witnesses came forward to testify and he was acquitted.

In 1985, he fell out with Kalani over division of extortion money. Meanwhile, Pappu Kalani had become politically powerful with the Indian National Congress party – he was to be elected from Ulhasnagar the following year. That April, Rajwani was arrested in an extortion case, apparently at Kalani's bidding. As Rajwani was being escorted to the Vithalwadi police station in a rickshaw, Kalani arranged for his men to attack him with bombs and guns. Rajwani survived the attack, but was seriously injured and was admitted to the JJ Hospital. Here, he met Haji Mastan, a notorious smuggler and senior don of that time. Haji Mastan took Rajwani under his wing and arranged for him to go to Dubai.

In Dubai, he met Dawood Ibrahim and began helping him buy real estate in Mumbai. Among the properties he negotiated was a flat in Lokhandwala Complex, which was to be the scene of a famous shootout where the "encounter" specialist (policeman known for killing off gangsters) Aftaab Ahmed Khan gunned down six of Dawood's aides including Maya Dolas. Much of the fourteen-hour encounter was televised live and made Khan a celebrity.

In April 1989, the Kalani family leader, Pappu's uncle Dudhichand Kalani, was murdered, allegedly by Gopal Rajwani's gang, at the insistence of Gop Behrani. This led to reprisal killings – as many as 22 murders in five months. It was said during this period that "there would be a killing in Ulhasnagar every Tuesday." It was during this period that Pappu Kalani emerged as the leader of his own organized crime gang.

In 1992, Pappu Kalani was arrested for the murder of Rajwani henchman Maruthi Jadhav (and subsequently charged in seven other murders). Pappu was in jail for nine years, and in this period, Rajwani returned to Ulhasnagar. He joined the Shiv Sena in 1995, and emerged as a top leader of the party in Ulhasnagar.

On 24 January 2000, around 11 AM, as he was getting off from his car to attend court at the First-Class Magistrate's court in Ulhasnagar, he was attacked by four gunmen, and died of injuries to the head, chest, neck and back.

It is widely believed that Pappu Kalani, recently elected MLA from Ulhasnagar, although in jail at the time, had masterminded his murder.
