= Elisha Kriis =

Indian film actress

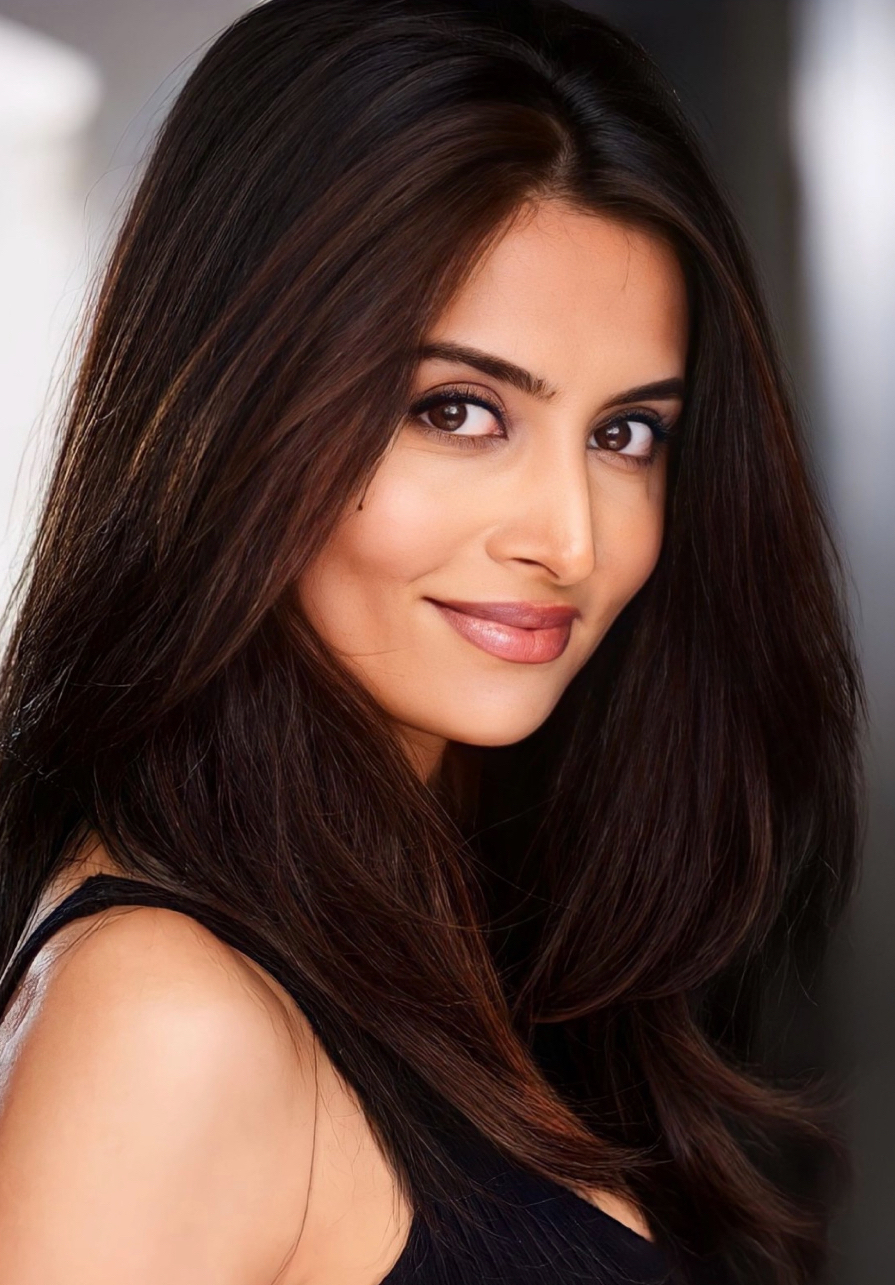
- Kriis in 2024
- Born: Godhra, Panchmahal, Gujarat, India
- Education: The Maharaja Sayajirao University
- Occupation: Actress
- Years active: 2014–present
- Height: 167.64 cm (5 ft 6 in)
- Website: elishakriis.com

Elisha Kriis aka Elisha Patel is an Indian and American film actress and television personality. She has appeared in American, Hindi and Telugu films. In the United States she has starred in, 2018 human trafficking drama BorderCross, alongside Lorenzo Lamas and Danny Trejo, was the main protagonist in the 2018 crime thriller Body of Sin, played a cyborg in the 2018 SciFi action Ink and Rain, . She has appeared in supporting roles in films like The Recall starring Wesley Snipes and in the trading card comedy feature titled Tournament 2019 starring Ricardo Chavira. In India she has appeared in political drama Wake Up India. action thriller Zanjeer starring Priyanka Chopra, remake of Zanjeer in Telugu Toofan and NDTV Goodtimes adventure travel documentary titled Kingfisher Blue Mile.

== Early life ==
Kriis was born and raised in Gujarat, India. Her mother, Bhagwati Patel, and father, Jahangir Patel, served as former judges for the State of Gujarat.

Kriis graduated with a Bachelor of Business Administration degree from Maharajah Sayajirao University of Vadodara. Her graduation was followed by a studio training program in Mumbai. In June 2014 Kriis was invited as a speaker by College of the Canyons, California, to address the Beyond Barriers women empowerment conference. Her lecture at the conference referenced the power of education and empowering others to empower yourself.

== Career ==
Her first theater performance was in the fourth grade and later that year the drama was chosen to be aired by DD1, one of India's largest broadcasting networks. Growing up she had a huge passion for exploring different places and cultures which made an impact on her life from an early age. She eventually pursued her Bachelor of Business Administration degree at The Maharaja Sayajirao University of Baroda, Vadodara, where she won a handful of fashion and beauty contests sponsored by well known brands such as MTV, Cavin Kare, Westside and Pantaloons. While in college she also worked as a host for several corporate award shows and women empowerment workshops. She graduated with a bachelor's degree from MSU and then eventually moved to Mumbai to pursue her career in the entertainment industry.

=== Television ===
She started her career as a host for India's international travel channels such as, Travelxp, Travel Trendz and NDTV Good Times. Her shows have been filmed and televised in multiple countries across Europe, Middle East and Southeast Asia in Hindi, English, Telugu, and Arabic languages.

=== Film ===
She made her Hindi film debut with Wake Up India. In this film she plays the role of a fearless reporter that strives to expose the truth behind an alleged rape scandal involving the Chief Minister of the State. In 2013, she has appeared in the Hindi action movie Zanjeer, and the Telugu movie Toofan, also starring Priyanka Chopra, Sanjay Dutt and Ram Charan.

In 2014 Kriis started her own production company by the name of Tigress Pictures in Hollywood, Los Angeles. The company plans to focus on making inspirational films. Her first home production will be Barefoot Warriors, an original story and concept by Elisha Kriis, it is a feature film weaved around the passion and history of soccer (football) in India. In 2017 she appeared in a feature film titled BorderCross, based on the subject of Human Trafficking., In 2018 she was seen in a starring role in the independent feature film Body of Sin, a crime thriller where she portrays the character of Erica Tate, an unapologetic con artist who uses her skills to steal from straying men and Ink and Rain where she plays a Cyborg fight handler in a comic fantasy fight arena. In 2019 she joined Ken Kragen's Hands Around the World climate change campaign. In 2020 she was seen in a Gujarati Travel Short Havmore Passport alongside Malhar Thakar and musician Arpit Gandhi.

In 2021 she hosted a pre Oscar show titled Hollywood Unlimited for Disney's Oscar awards show partnering network Star World India. directed and produced a short documentary titled The Fruit of Life, bringing light to the story of woman who claimed to have successfully beat breast cancer by consuming of the leaves of Graviola Tree.

== Filmography ==
=== Television ===
Year	Show	Role	Note
2011- 2016	Best from the Rest	Host	Talk Show
2012	Nordic Quest	Host	Television Movie
2014- 2017	Travelxp	Host	
2014	Kingfisher BlueMile	Herself	
2015	Undercover	Melissa	Television series
2016	Exotic Fashion TV		Television Special

=== Film ===
Year	Film	Role	Language	Note
2011	Ra.One	Party Girl	Hindi	Uncredited role
2013	Wake Up India	Supriya	Hindi	
2013	Zanjeer	Shital	Hindi	Bilingual Film
2013	Toofan	Shital	Telugu	Bilingual Film
2015	The Better Half		English	Executive Producer
2015	Hansel vs Gretel	Circe	English	
2016	BorderCross	Tara	English	
2017	The Recall	Eva Kapur	English	
2017	Gudiya	Pooja Chopra		
2017	The Twisted Doll	Pooja Chopra	English	Short Film.
2018	Ink and Rain	Lex	English	
2018	Body of Sin	Erica Tate	English	
2019	Tournament	Jasmine	English	
2019	Barefoot Warriors	Anjani	English	Original Concept and Story
2019	Awake Alone	Trisha	English	
2020	Skate God	Jade	English	
2020	Havmore Passport (Short)	Self	Gujarati	Co-Host
2021	Hollywood Unlimited (Short)	Self	English	Host
2022	Fruit of Life (Doc)	Self	English	Host/ Director
2022	Highway Nights (2022 film)	Self	Hindi	Associate Producer
