= Maya Dolas =

Indian criminal

Mahindra "Maya" Dolas Rajput
- Dolas' portrait
- Born: 15 October 1966; Pratiksha Nagar, Mumbai, Maharashtra, India
- Died: 16 November 1991 (aged 25); Lokhandwala Complex, Andheri, Mumbai
- Cause of death: Police encounter
- Occupations: Gangster; extortionist
- Organization: D-Company

Maya Dolas (born Rajput Mahindra Dolas; 15 October 1966 – 16 November 1991) was an Indian gangster who used to work for the D-Company, Dawood Ibrahim. He was killed in an encounter at the 1991 Lokhandwala Complex shootout by the then Additional Police Commissioner of Mumbai, Aftab Ahmed Khan, at the age of 25.

Dolas' story was made into a 2007 movie titled Shootout at Lokhandwala, with Vivek Oberoi playing the role of Maya, and Amrita Singh acting as his mother Ratna Prabha Dolas.

== Biography ==
Dolas was born in 1966 to Vithoba and Ratna Prabha Dolas in the slums of Mumbai. He was one of their six children. Dolas joined the Ashok Joshi Gang in 1980 and rose quickly through the ranks in the outfit. He ran several successful extortion rackets for the criminal - politician Ashok Joshi's gang at Kanjur Marg which was also affiliated with the Arun Gawli.

== Education ==
Dolas completed his education in ITI at Mumbai, India.

== Shootout at Lokhandwala ==
The Lokhandwala Complex is an upper end middle-class housing area in Andheri (Swati A wing Flat no. 002 and 003), Mumbai, where Shiv Sena criminal-politician Gopal Rajwani had purchased a flat for mega-mobster Dawood Ibrahim. In 1991, Ibrahim's henchmen Dolas and Dilip Buwa, along with four others, were in this apartment when they were surrounded by a group of the Mumbai Police led by ACP Aftab Ahmed Khan; it was later alleged that Khan had been tipped off by Ibrahim who wanted the police to kill them. During the encounter, Dolas was hit by 100 bullets.

The ensuing four-hour shootout, much of it publicised live on news channels, made Dolas infamous, and the police officer Khan a household name. After the encounter, it was alleged that the Anti-Terrorism Squad (ATS), which had participated in the encounter, had made off with Rs. 70 lakh (Rs. 70,00,000) cash which was with Dolas. A number of inquiries conducted by the Mumbai Police failed to turn up any concrete evidence.

Maya Dolas was just reckless and foul mouthed. Dilip Buwa was cold-blooded. Unlike Dolas, nothing could divert Buwa’s attention when his fingers were on the trigger. He was a mentor to Chhota Rajan. Post shootout media coverage made out Dolas to be the big gun. “It was far from the truth. Dolas just kept hurling abuses from inside the building, while there being pumped by Buwa. I knew nothing about Dolas, except his reputation. Buwa was something else. He was Ibrahim’s best shooter and his most efficient killer. Till date, there has been no second.

— Aftab Ahmed Khan, Officer in-charge of the Anti-Terrorism Squad at the time of Lokhandwala shootout

Dolas' mother Ratna Prabha had appealed to the court to ban the movie Shootout at Lokhandwala (2007) stating that the movie presents her son falsely. For example, the movie shows that he had killed his abusive father at age nine, whereas in reality, his father outlived Dolas and died in 1997. She also claimed that he was an ITI passout. Taking note of the fact that the movie also portrays Ratna as encouraging the criminal tendencies in her son, the suit wanted the producer to re-do the film. Chhota Rajan also objected to the film, saying that it "grossly distorts the facts". In response, Khan (the cop who led up front the team which gunned down Dolas) rubbished Rajan's claim, saying that the operation was videographed and it was conducted in full view of the public.

The directors claim that the movie is highly fictionalised, although it uses the real names, and the movie opens with an apology to the real characters. A Mumbai sessions court refused to stay the film release based on the case in May 2012.
