= Dilip Buwa =

Indian mobster (1962–1991)

Buwa
- Born: Dilip Kohoko; 1962; Chinchpokli, Bombay, Maharashtra, India (present-day Mumbai)
- Died: 16 November 1991 (aged 29); Lokhandwala, Bombay, Maharashtra, India

Dilip Buwa (born Dilip Kohok; 1962 – 16 November 1991) was an Indian gangster who used to work for the D-Company, an international crime syndicate of the Mumbai underworld led by Dawood Ibrahim. He was one of the men who were killed in 1991 by an encounter during the Lokhandwala Complex shootout. Buwa was killed by the Mumbai police Anti-Terrorism Squad (ATS).

Buwa was portrayed by Tusshar Kapoor in the Bollywood film Shootout at Lokhandwala (2007).

The director of the movie, Apoorva Lakhia, stated in an interview that Buwa once deliberately fired his pistol at the feet of two girls at a bus stand in Bhandup, just because they were laughing at him.

In 1977, gangsters Rama Naik and Babu Reshim from central Bombay formed a joint gang called "Byculla Company" along with other Maharashtrian gangsters like Arun Gawli, Sada Pawle, Kiran Walawalkar, Chandrashekhar Mirashi and Ashok Choudhary aka Chota Babu.

Buwa lived in Premier Colony, Sonapur Lane in Kurla (West) in east Mumbai. He started his crime graph at a very young age and hobnobbed first as an errand boy, then as an extortionist and later as a sharp shooter while working gangsters like Kiran Walawalkar of Koliwada, Ashok Joshi of Kanjurmarg and Rama Naik of Byculla.

Dilip Buwa's name first came up after the daylight murders of smugglers and sleazy hotel/club owners Mahesh Dholakia and his elder brother Arvind Dholakia. It was rumoured that Buwa was one of the sharp-shooters involved in their shooting in 1987 and in 1988 respectively. The murders of Dholakia brothers were planned and orchestrated by the combined gangs of Arun Gawli and Ashok Joshi as a revenge against the Dholakia brothers who had planned and funded the murder of gangster Babu Reshim in Jacob Circle police station in 1987.

Later, Buwa worked as a sharpshooter for dreaded gangster, Ashok Joshi of Vikhroli and Kanjurmarg area, where he became friends with two other gangsters, Anil Parab alias Vaangya and Mahendra Dolas alias Maya Dolas. Buwa was one of the few sharpshooters of those times who was trained in using AK-47.

After Ashok Joshi was shot dead in December 1988 by a 15-member hit squad sent by Dawood Ibrahim, Buwa and Parab were paid off by Chhota Rajan, a former associate of Dawood to switch sides and join Dawood's D company. Buwa along with Maya Dolas and few other gang members worked in Chhota Rajan's group within the D company and managed a part of the extortion business on behalf of Dawood Ibrahim.
