= Pappu Kalani =

Indian politician

- Born: c. 1951
- Occupation: Politician
- Spouse: Jyoti Kalani
- Children: 1

Suresh alias Pappu Budharmal Kalani, known popularly as Pappu Kalani (Note: While Pappu may be a nickname, he prefers it as part of the formal name, writing Suresh (Pappu) Budharmal Kalani in his election papers.) (born c. 1951) is an Indian criminal-politician from Ulhasnagar, Maharashtra.

After emerging as the leader of an organized crime syndicate in the 1980s, he was elected president of the Ulhasnagar municipal council in 1986. He was elected to Maharashtra Vidhan Sabha in 1990 elections as Indian National Congress candidate from Ulhasnagar constituency. He won 1995 and 1999 assembly elections as Independent. He won two elections in the period 1992–2001 when he was in jail on murder charges. He was elected the MLA from Ulhasnagar again in 2004 as a member of the Republican Party of India (Athawale).

Kalani was once on bail in 19 cases including eight of murder. He was given a life sentence on 3 December 2013 as a result of the 23-year-old murder case of Ghanashyam Bhatija. Ghanashyam Bhatija was murdered on 27 February 1990 near the Pinto Resorts in Ulhasnagar of Thane district. His brother Inder Bhatija, who had seen the murder, was also shot dead on 27 April 1999 despite having police protection. Kalani was later acquitted on 18 November 2017 "...on basis of lack of evidence..."

== Life and career ==
Born into a wealthy family, Pappu Kalani's uncle Dunichand Kalani was the president of the local unit of Indian National Congress. The family ran a liquor business and owned a number of distilleries and hotels. In the 1970s, Ulhasnagar was a booming lawless town settled by entrepreneurial refugees who had emigrated from Sindh, Pakistan after the Partition of India in 1947. Sharp business practices (Ulhasnagar was known for its "duplicate"s or forged goods) combined with illegal construction and unauthorised industrial units made for an atmosphere where "protection" emerged as a profitable business.

A number of gangs were soon working under the patronage of political parties. Pappu Kalani's uncle Keemat Kalani, also affiliated with the Congress party, ran the gang headed by Chiman Tejwani, while the opposing parties, under politician Gop Behrani, employed the gang of Govind Vachani and Gopal Rajwani. It is reported that both gangs were connected to the Dawood Ibrahim gang. They also use media effectively, and hush money were regularly paid to journalists.

In 1983, Gopal Rajwani was for a while aligned with Pappu Kalani, and they executed the brutal knife murder of the editor A. V. Narayan of Blitz magazine. Rajwani was arrested for this, but he was eventually acquitted due to lack of witnesses and shoddy prosecution.

In 1986, Pappu Kalani was elected president of the Ulhasnagar Municipal Council (UMC), and the same year, he was chosen by the Indian National Congress party as its candidate for the state legislature from Ulhasnagar, and easily won the seat.

Meanwhile, Gopal Rajwani and Pappu had fallen out over the division of extortion money. In April 1985, Rajwani was arrested in an extortion case, apparently at Kalani's bidding. As Rajwani was being escorted to the police station in a rickshaw, Kalani arranged for his men to attack him with bombs and guns. Rajwani survived the attack and eventually relocated to Dubai, with the help of Haji Mastan, a notorious smuggler and senior don of that time.

In April 1989, Pappu's uncle Dudhichand Kalani was murdered, allegedly by the Govind Vachani / Gopal Rajwani gang, at the instance of Gop Behrani. This led to reprisal killings – as many as 22 murders in five months. It was said during this period that "there would be a killing in Ulhasnagar every Tuesday." It was during this period that Pappu Kalani emerged as the leader of his own organized crime gang.

=== Bhathija, Anna, and Jadhav murders ===
In February and April 1990, nephews of Gop Behrani, Ghanashyam and Inder Bhateja were shot dead, despite having been given state police protection. Also shot dead in 1990 were gangster Anna, and rickshaw union leader and bodyguard of Rajwani, Maruti Jadhav, both of whom were affiliated with the Gopal Rajwani gang. Jadhav in his dying declaration, as well as another person who was injured in the revolver attack, identified Pappu Kalani personally, and he would later be refused bail in this murder case.

In 1990, when Pappu Kalani was formally named in some of these murders, he was expelled from the Congress party.

In 1992, when the clean-imaged Sudhakarrao Naik took over as Chief Minister from Sharad Pawar, he launched a drive against criminal-politicians. Media pressure increased tremendously after the September 1992 shootout where Dawood Ibrahim's gang killed Shailesh Haldankar of the Arun Gawli gang as well as several on-duty policemen at Mumbai's JJ Hospital. Thereafter, Pappu Kalani were arrested in November 1992, along with some others gangsters. Pappu was charged with the gang murders from 1990 and with the JJ Hospital shootout-ably executed by D-Company's Shyam Kishore Garikapatti alias "Black Scorpion"; a total of 19 cases were filed against him. Several appeals against his incarceration failed – the court found him sufficiently implicated in the Maruti Jadhav murder to label him as However, TADA laws were found inappropriate in some other charges – particularly for both the Bhateja murders, and also in the JJ Hospital shootout case, which were transferred to a sessions court. However, none of these cases progressed to trial. Altogether, he spent nine years in jail under TADA before being eventually released on bail in 2002.

At one point, Sudhakarrao made a statement that the state leader of Indian National Congress party and erstwhile Chief Minister Sharad Pawar, had asked him to "go easy on Pappu Kalani". At another time, Chief Minister Manohar Joshi of Shiv Sena announced his intention to prosecute criminal-politicians, but political realities ensured that nothing much was done.

Under Indian law, someone who has not been sentenced to more than two years for a crime cannot be considered guilty of a major crime and is free to fight elections. Thus, despite being in jail, Kalani kept fighting and winning the assembly seat from Ulhasnagar, partly because of the family's muscle, but also because in his first term, Kalani had worked to improve the roads and the water supply.

In 1999, when his mentor Sharad Pawar formed the National Congress Party, Pappu also joined it. However, mounting public pressure proved disruptive for the nascent party and he was forced to resign. At this time, he handed over the Municipal corporation to his wife Jyoti Kalani, who would also soon be arrested on charges of forgery, non-payment of revenue and illegal liquor manufacturing.

=== Rajwani murder ===
Meanwhile, in January 2000, arch rival Gopal Rajwani was shot dead in a hail of bullets as he was coming out of a car at the magistrate's court to attend a case. It was widely believed that Pappu Kalani, at the time still in jail, may have masterminded it.

Immediately after his release from jail in 2001, several cases arose where he allegedly tried to intimidate one Bhoir family, part of whose land had been illegally encroached upon to build the Seema Holiday Home (since demolished) owned by the Kalanis, and also the shopowner Ramesh Rohra.

In 2004, Pappu Kalani again won the assembly elections, as a candidate of the Republican Party of India (Athavale). His wife however, continues to be with the National Congress Party.

In 2005, the Bombay High Court ordered the demolition of 855 illegal structures in Ulhasnagar, Pappu Kalani, a large part of whose extortion money depended on permitting illegal constructions, passed a law permitting most of them to be legalized. However, many structures did not even pay the legalization fees, and large scale demolitions were launched in Ulhasnagar for most of 2006.

In the municipal elections of 2007, despite very little electioneering by opposing groups, Pappu Kalani's group mustered only 15 seats (out of 76), and it is thought that the influence of musclepower may have waned considerably in Ulhasnagar.

== Family ==
Pappu Kalani's wife Jyoti Kalani emerged on her own during the years when he was out of power or in prison, becoming the president (mayor) of the powerful Ulhasnagar Municipal Council. In recent years, she too faced several charges of intimidation and forgery, and lost the 2007 municipal elections. His son Omi Kalani has been named in several extortion and assault cases in 2005, and he also has a daughter Seema.

In 2004, his brother Narayan Kalani was arrested for three murders dating back to the ruinous gang warfare of 1990.
