= Jyoti Kalani =

Indian politician (1951–2021)

- Born: 17 February 1951
- Died: 18 April 2021 (aged 70)
- Spouse: Pappu Kalani
- Children: 3

Jyoti Kalani (17 February 1951– 18 April 2021) was an Indian politician from Ulhasnagar (a suburb of Mumbai, India). She emerged on her own during the years when her husband was out of power or in prison. She became the president (mayor) of the powerful Ulhasnagar Municipal Council. Later, she too faced several charges of intimidation and forgery.

Kalani died on 18 April 2021, aged 70, of a heart attack.
