= Vivek Oberoi =

Indian actor and businessman (born 1976)

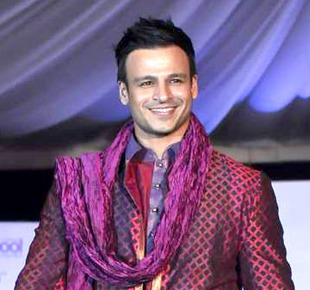
- Oberoi in 2016
- Born: Vivek Anand Oberoi; 3 September 1976 (age 50); Hyderabad, Andhra Pradesh (present-day Telangana), India
- Occupations: Actor; businessman
- Years active: 2002–present
- Works: Full list
- Spouse: Priyanka Alva Oberoi (m. 2010)
- Children: 2
- Father: Suresh Oberoi
- Family: Oberoi family

Vivek Anand Oberoi (born 3 September 1976) is an Indian actor and businessman. The son of actor Suresh Oberoi, he began acting in 2002 with starring roles in the Hindi crime film Company and romantic drama Saathiya. His performances in them were praised and he won two Filmfare Awards for the former. He subsequently had intermittent commercial successes in the comedy Masti (2004), horror film Kaal (2005) and action film Shootout at Lokhandwala (2007), while his supporting performance in the dramas Omkara (2006) and Kurbaan (2009) were praised.

Following a decline, he had commercial success in 2013 with the sequels Grand Masti and Krrish 3. He has since expanded to South Indian cinema, playing villainous roles in the action films Vivegam (2017), Lucifer (2019), Vinaya Vidheya Rama (2019), and Kaduva (2022).

== Early life and education ==
Vivek Anand Oberoi was born on 3 September 1976 in Hyderabad, Telangana, to a Punjabi father, Suresh Oberoi, an actor. Vivek's mother Yashodhara, who married Suresh in 1974, is also a Punjabi, hailing from a business family that has been living in South India.

Oberoi went on to study at Mayo College, Ajmer and Mithibai College, Mumbai. At an actors' workshop in London, he was spotted by the director of New York University who took Oberoi to New York, where he completed his master's degree in film acting.

== Career ==
=== 2002–2004: Early success ===
Oberoi made his debut with Ram Gopal Varma's gangster film Company. The film emerged as a critical and commercial success. Jyoti Shukla of Rediff.com called it a "fast-paced film anchored by brilliant performances." She praised the performances of Mohanlal, Ajay Devgn, and Oberoi in particular, and said they are "a treat to watch." Derek Elley of Variety wrote: "By Bollywood standards, a dark and realistic look at the Mumbai underworld through the battle between a powerful don and his vengeful former sidekick, Company manages to cater to Hindi cinema norms while feeding the viewer something a little different." In 2010, Raja Sen wrote in his review: "This finely plotted duel between two gangsters left us battered, bruised and craving more". The film earned him two Filmfare Awards for Best Male Debut and Best Supporting Actor. The same year, he starred in the action films Road and Dum. He ended 2002 with the romantic drama Saathiya alongside Rani Mukerji. The film was a critical and commercial success and earned him a nomination for the Filmfare Award for Best Actor.

In 2004, he starred in the comedy Masti and the political thriller Yuva, both of which emerged as critical and commercial successes.

=== 2005–2009: Career fluctuations ===
In 2005, he played the title character in Subhash Ghai's Kisna: The Warrior Poet. In 2006, Oberoi appeared in the crime drama Omkara, Vishal Bhardwaj's adaptation of Shakespeare's play Othello, playing the character of Kesu, based on the character Michael Cassio in the original play. After seeing Oberoi's performance, Gulzar congratulated him.

In 2007, Oberoi played the gangster Maya Dolas in Shootout at Lokhandwala. The film earned him a nomination for the Filmfare Award for Best Villain.

In 2008, Oberoi starred in Mission Istanbul, directed by Apoorva Lakhia and produced by Ekta Kapoor. He performed to the song "Apun Ke Saath", produced for the film by Vikas Kohli, at the 2008 International Indian Film Academy Awards. It received negative reviews from critics. Bollywood Hungama critic Taran Adarsh gave it 1.5 out of 5 stars. The Hindu stated that Mission Istaanbul has no sting. Rediff.com gave it 1 star.

In 2009, Oberoi starred with Kareena Kapoor, Saif Ali Khan, Om Puri, Kirron Kher and Dia Mirza in the romantic thriller Kurbaan, directed by Rensil D'Silva and produced by Dharma Productions. It received positive reviews from critics, with praise for its direction, screenplay, soundtrack, and performances of the cast, with particular praise directed towards Kapoor's performance. However, despite critical acclaim, it was declared a flop by Box Office India.

=== 2010–2013: Revival attempts ===
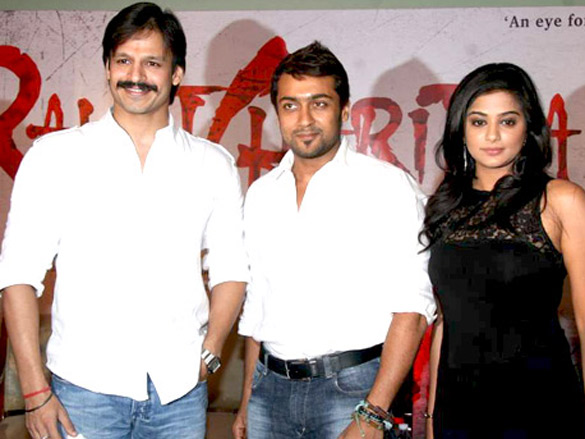
Oberoi along with Suriya and Priyamani during the press meet of Rakta Charitra 2

In 2010, Oberoi appeared in Prince, which failed to receive a good response from the audience, despite a good opening. Taran Adarsh of Bollywood Hungama rated it 3 out of 5, saying "Prince has all merits to strike a chord with the youth", praising Oberoi's 'bravura' performance, the film's 'Hollywood style' look and action sequences, as well as the music. Noyon Jyoti Parasara of AOL India gave 3 out of 5, saying, "once you are willing to let go off your beliefs and logic – like you really can't jump off a cliff on your bike and remain unscratched – you would like the film." On the other hand, Omar Qureshi of Zoom rated Prince 2.5 out of 5, saying, "The film is over-the-top and unrealistic." Indiatimes.com rated it 2 out of 5 stars saying, "The film has taken the audience for granted, which shows us gadgets hard to believe and futuristic and that such futuristic shows should be limited to Hollywood.". Subhash K. Jha gave 2 out of 5 stars, and said, "Prince wears its super-cool shirt with the slogan 'Come Watch Me' with a little bit too much aggression. But if you love popcorn crunching adventure stories watch Vivek Oberoi play the hero from the hemisphere of hijinks." He praised Oberoi's acting and the action sequences, saying that "To his credit, Oberoi carries off the ceaseless stint with the stunt with arresting aplomb[...]The expertly-executed stunts frequently see our hero jumping down high-rise buildings in breathtaking leaps of fate, with the camera pulling back in respectful awe."

In the same year, he appeared in Ram Gopal Varma's Rakht Charitra playing the role of the Telugu politician Paritala Ravi. Oberoi's performance in the role of Paritala Ravi drew widespread praise, while Abhimanyu Singh's devious turn as Bukka Reddy, modelled on the real-life Obul Reddy, was regarded as one of the most terrifying villainous acts captured on celluloid in a long time. Renuka Rao of DNA India gave the movie 4 stars in a scale of 5, concluding that RGV has surprisingly thrown at the audience a film that could actually evoke some emotions in you. A must, must watch." Taran Adarsh of Bollywood Hungama gave the movie 4 stars in a scale of 5, saying that "On the whole, RAKHT CHARITRA is not for the faint-hearted or the lily-livered. The violence, the blood and gore depicted in the film will shock and disconcert you, which only goes to establish as to how proficiently the subject material has been treated." Nikhat Kazmi of Times of India gave the movie 3 stars out of 5, stating that "Rakta Charitra holds up a brutal mirror on the muck that masquerades as democracy in India." Rajeev Masand of CNN-IBN gave the movie 3 out of 5 stars, noting that "Rakta Charitra is a bold, disturbing film that's bursting with the kind of confidence we haven't seen from the filmmaker recently. If the sight of blood doesn't make you uncomfortable, chances are you'll enjoy this film."

Oberoi produced a film named Dekh Indian Circus in 2011. The film was featured in the 16th Busan Film festival, winning the Audience Choice Award for Best Film from 3000 films worldwide and among 380 films screened. In 16 years of the history of Busan, this is the First Indian Film to win the award. The film has already received rave reviews from international critics and reporters from The Hollywood Reporter, Variety and Screen International. The film received overwhelmingly positive reviews from the critics. Richard Kuipers of Variety praised it for "bringing the themes of inequality and class divisions together in the highly entertaining visit to the big top." Kirk Honeycutt in his review for The Hollywood Reporter, praised director Mangesh Hadawale for portraying third-world issues through a family comedy that contains a stinging satire of contemporary India and its rampant corruption.

Oberoi's film Kismat Love Paisa Dilli, which was released in October 2012, failed to impress the audience and was a box office failure.

He also played supervillain Kaal in Krrish 3 (2013). Critics directed praise towards cast performances (particularly Hrithik Roshan, Kangana Ranaut and Oberoi), VFX, cinematography, background score, direction and entertainment value, but criticism has been directed towards the film's lack of originality, soundtrack and writing. Taran Adarsh of Bollywood Hungama gave the film 4.5 out of 5 stars and stated that "the film has all the ingredients that make a splendid superhero film, besides being Rakesh Roshan's most accomplished work so far." Madhureeta Mukherjee of The Times of India gave it 4.5 stars while commenting "For sheer vision, bravado and superlative execution, this one soars to new orbits. Latch on to this cape for an exhilarating ride." Raedita Tandan of Filmfare awarded it 4 out of 5 stars, remarking "Hats off to Rakesh Roshan for dreaming big and actually pulling off this risky proposition. It's not perfect. But it has all the elements a good, entertaining film must have. All you Marvel superheroes, better watch out. Krrish is here to stay." Anupama Chopra of the Hindustan Times gave it 3.5 stars and said, "Filmmaker Rakesh Roshan deserves a round of applause for giving us a homegrown superhero. Krrish 3 is ambitious and exciting." Sarita Tanwar of DNA gave it 3.5 stars and wrote, "Krrish 3 is fast-paced and the VFX effects are smashing." Rohit Khilnani of India Today gave it 3.5 stars noting, "The only part where the movie dips are during the songs. The music sounds too dated for this action-packed film." The film earned him his second nomination for the Filmfare Award for Best Supporting Actor.

=== 2014–present: Professional expansion and commercial decline ===
Oberoi dubbed the voice of Electro in the Hindi-dubbed version of The Amazing Spider-Man 2, which was released in May 2014.

In 2017, Oberoi made his Tamil debut in supporting role alongside Ajith Kumar in action thriller film Vivegam. The film received mixed reviews from critics. The Times of India rated the film 3 out of 5 and said "Vivegam is an over-the-top but engaging action thriller with a calculated mix of brawn and brain, action and sentiment, smartly pandering to fans while giving families something to connect with." NDTV rated the film 2.5 out of 5 stars and cited "Ajith Is Charismatic But Let Down By Silly Scenes". Behindwoods rated the film 2.25 out of 5, stating, "Vivegam – High on production value and action. Heavily dependent on Ajith's persona, engagement factor takes a beating". Mirchi9 gave the film 2 out of 5 stars, saying "Overall, Vivekam is for the fans and fans alone for whom just watching the star on screen is enough. There is ample style and punch dialogues with a healthy dose of action. For everyone else, it is an utterly boring film". Nowrunning rated the film 1.5/5 and said "Director Siva had collected a bunch of Spy movies from Hollywood and made a mashup of them. He picked up all the action blocks and combined it with loud background score which will only irk the audience. Even the action is also missing in the second half and there is no logic at all. The climax is stretched further which disappoints the audience". The film earned him a nomination for the Filmfare Award for Best Supporting Actor – Tamil.

Oberoi worked with YRF banner's film Bank Chor, with Rhea Chakraborty and Riteish Deshmukh.

He also appeared in Ram Charan starrer Telugu film Vinaya Vidheya Rama (2019), It received negative reviews from critics and became a box-office bomb, which prompted Charan to issue an apology letter. The Indian Express gave 1 out of 5 stars stating "Vinaya Vidheya Rama is like watching a Balakrishna action film on steroids. Clumsy and unconvincing screenplay". The New Indian Express gave 1.5 out of 5 stars stating "If there is a plot and a story that is worth a notice, then it is lost between all the fights, songs, dances and random elevation dialogues". Hindustan Times gave 0.5 out of 5 stars stating "The film itself feels dated. It is a mess that even Ram Charan – with all the weird stunts -- cannot punch his way out of". Firstpost gave 1.5 out of 5 stars stating "Realism has absolutely no place in the world of Vinaya Vidheya Rama".

In 2019, Oberoi made his Malayalam debut with Mohanlal in Prithviraj Sukumaran's directorial debut, Lucifer, as the main antagonist, Bobby, in which his performance as a villain was well received by critics and the audience. Times of India gave the film 3.5 out of 5 writing "Lucifer is a 'mass entertainer' that is sure to please the fans and has enough going for to make it an engaging thriller as well. And apart from the mandatory Stan Lee, correction, Antony Perumbavoor cameo, watch out for Stephen's second avatar in the film."

He has featured as a talent judge for three seasons of the reality show India's Best Dramebaaz. He portrayed the role of India's Prime Minister Narendra Modi in PM Narendra Modi. The film was universally panned by critics, who termed it a hagiography and criticised Oberoi's performance. Renuka Vyavahare of The Times of India gave the film two and a half stars out of five and criticised the script, opining, "This one is too lopsided for you to appreciate. It leaves a lot unanswered. While it firmly believes 'Modi ek insaan nahi, soch hai', we wish the script was as thoughtful". However, she was among the few who appreciated Oberoi's performance- "He gets the mannerisms, accent and tone right and thankfully doesn't overdo it". Writing for The Indian Express, Shubhra Gupta gave the movie two stars out of five and stated, "The film is not a mere bio-pic, it is a full-fledged, unabashed, unapologetic hagiography". Kennith Rosario of The Hindu summarised the movie's narrative as "a obsequious love letter" to the protagonist which tells the audience "how sincere, hardworking, fair and honest Modi is, [and] that it makes you wonder if life is a parody of this film".

In 2022, he starred in Malayalam language film Kaduva opposite Prithviraj Sukumaran. Despite receiving mixed reviews, it was a commercial success. Sajin Shrijith of The New Indian Express found Oberoi's character to be "basic". He also starred in a short film, Verses of War. During 2022, Oberoi also appeared in the Telugu biographical film Khudiram Bose, based on Indian revolutionary Khudiram Bose.

He then starred in MX Player series Dharavi Bank alongside Suniel Shetty.

== Filmography ==
Key
†	Denotes films that have not yet been released

=== Films ===
Year	Title	Role	Notes	Ref.
2002	Company	Chandrakanth Nagre		
2002	Road	Arvind Chauhan		
2002	Saathiya	Aditya Sehgal		
2003	Dum	Uday Shinde		
2003	Darna Mana Hai	Amar	Segment: Ghostly Lift	
2004	Yuva	Arjun Balachandran		
2004	Kyun! Ho Gaya Na...	Arjun Khanna	Also screenwriter	
2004	Masti	Meet Mehta		
2005	Kaal	Dev Malhotra		
2005	Kisna: The Warrior Poet	Kisna Singh		
2005	Deewane Huye Paagal	–	Narrator	
2006	Home Delivery: Aapko... Ghar Tak	Sunny Chopra		
2006	Pyare Mohan	Mohan		
2006	Omkara	Keshav "Kesu" Firangi		
2006	Naksha	Vicky Malhotra		
2007	Shootout at Lokhandwala	Maya Dolas		
2007	Fool n Final	Lucky		
2008	Mission Istaanbul	Rizwan Khan		
2009	Luck by Chance	Himself	Cameo appearance	
2009	Kurbaan	Riyaz Masood		
2010	Prince	Prince		
2010	Rakta Charitra	Kattula Pratap Ravi	Bilingual film	
2010	Rakta Charitra II	Kattula Pratap Ravi	Bilingual film	
2012	Kismet Love Paisa Dilli	Lucky		
2013	Zila Ghaziabad	Satbir Gujjar		
2013	Jayantabhai Ki Luv Story	Jayanta Bhai		
2013	Grand Masti	Meet Mehta		
2013	Krrish 3	Kaal		
2016	Great Grand Masti	Meet Mehta		
2017	Bank Chor	Amjad Khan		
2019	PM Narendra Modi	Narendra Modi	Also screenwriter	
2022	Versus of War	Major Sunil Bhatia	Short film	
2025	Kesari Veer	Zafar Khan		
2025	Mastiii 4	Meet Mehta		
2026	Ramayana: Part 1	Vidyutjeehva		

==== Other languages ====
Year	Film	Role	Language	Notes	Ref.
2010	Rakta Charitra	Kattula Pratap Ravi	Telugu	Bilingual film	
2010	Rakta Charitra II	Kattula Pratap Ravi	Telugu	Bilingual film	
2017	Vivegam	Aryan Singhania	Tamil		
2019	Vinaya Vidheya Rama	Raja Bhai Munna	Telugu		
2019	Lucifer	Bimal ''Bobby'' Nair	Malayalam		
2019	Rustum	DCP Bharath Raj	Kannada		
2022	Kaduva	IG Joseph Chandy	Malayalam		
2022	Khudiram Bose	Narendra Kumar Basu	Telugu		
2027	Spirit †	TBA	Telugu	Filming	

=== Television ===
Year	Title	Role	Notes
2013–2018	India's Best Dramebaaz	Judge	31 episodes
2017–present	Inside Edge	Vikrant Dhawan	28 episodes
2022	Dharavi Bank	JCP Jayant Gavaskar	10 episodes
2024	Indian Police Force	IG Vikram Bakshi	7 episodes

=== Music video ===
Year	Title	Artist	Ref.
2022	"Dhokebaaz" (featuring Tridha Choudhury)	Afsana Khan	

=== Dubbing ===
Year	Title	Role (actor)	Notes	Ref.
2014	The Amazing Spider-Man 2	Max Dillon/Electro (Jamie Foxx)	Hindi dubbed version	
2020	Dhira	Tenali Rama	Hindi dubbed version	
2025	Heads of State	Will Derringer (John Cena)	Hindi dubbed version	

== Personal life ==
Oberoi's full first name, Vivekanand, is based on that of the Hindu monk Swami Vivekananda; his father and grandfathers were followers of the monk. He says he dropped Anand when he joined Film out of respect for Vivekananda, as he considered it would be embarrassing romancing and dancing on screen with the name of the monk. Oberoi credits Kareena Kapoor as his inspiration for adopting a vegetarian diet.

Oberoi was engaged to model Gurpreet Gill in September 2002, before they broke up three months later. He then dated his Kyun! Ho Gaya Na... co-star Aishwarya Rai. In 2003, Oberoi claimed that Rai's former boyfriend, Salman Khan, had threatened him. In 2005, Oberoi and Rai broke up.

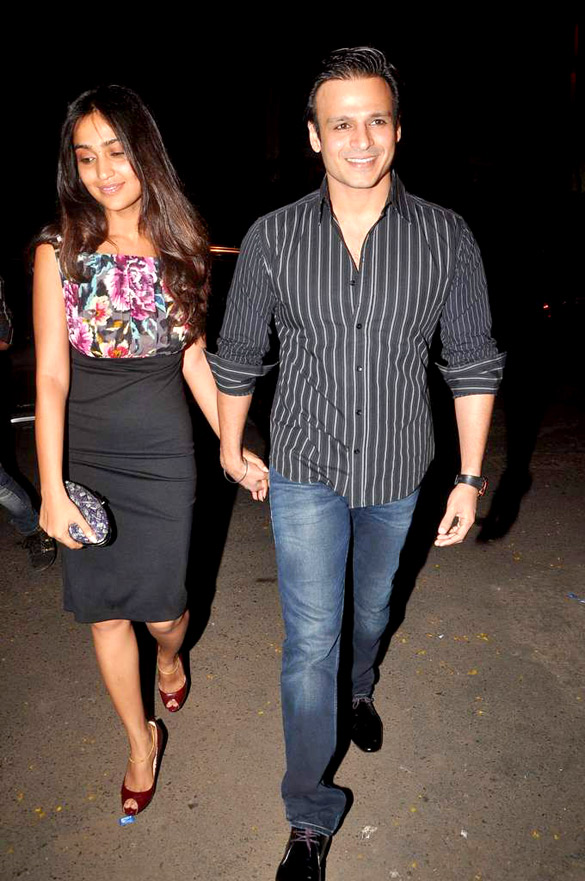
Oberoi with his wife Priyanka in 2012

On 29 October 2010, Oberoi married Priyanka Alva, daughter of Karnataka minister Jeevaraj Alva, in Bangalore. The couple have a son and a daughter.

== Philanthropy ==
Oberoi's company, Karrm Infrastructure Pvt Ltd., has donated 25 flats in the Thane district of Maharashtra to the families of Central Reserve Police Force officers killed in action. In all, Oberoi has donated about ₹ 3 million and helped raise ₹ 25 million.

Oberoi is the only Indian actor to be featured by Forbes for his philanthropic contributions in the areas of health, education, and disaster relief. His recognition highlights a sustained commitment to social impact beyond his film career. Oberoi's work includes support for cancer patients, initiatives in rural education, and active involvement in disaster relief efforts. This acknowledgment placed him among a select group of global celebrities noted for their humanitarian efforts.

As part of Project DEVI, thousands of girls were rescued from child labour and poverty in Vrindavan. The initiative, led by the Yashodhara Oberoi Foundation, focused on promoting girls’ education and empowering women to achieve economic self-sufficiency. However, the absence of a social audit makes it difficult to verify how many beneficiaries were actually impacted on the ground. In 2021, he donated Rs 25 lakh to the fund created to overcome the shortage of oxygen cylinders in hospitals.

== Accolades ==
Year	Award	Category	Work	Result	Ref.
2020	Asianet Film Awards	Best Actor in a Negative Role	Lucifer	Won	
2008	AXN Action Awards	Best Action Actor in a Negative Role	Shootout at Lokhandwala	Won	
2003	Bollywood Movie Awards	Best Male Debut	Company	Won	
2007	Bollywood Movie Awards	Best Supporting Actor	Omkara	Won	
2003	Filmfare Awards	Best Debut	Company	Won	
2003	Filmfare Awards	Best Supporting Actor	Company	Won	
2003	Filmfare Awards	Best Actor	Saathiya	Nominated	
2008	Filmfare Awards	Best Villain	Shootout at Lokhandwala	Nominated	
2013	Filmfare Awards	Best Supporting Actor	Krrish 3	Nominated	
2018	Filmfare Awards South	Best Supporting Actor – Tamil	Vivegam	Nominated	
2008	IIFA Awards	Best Villain	Shootout at Lokhandwala	Won	
2010	IIFA Awards	Green Global Award	—N/a	Won	
2003	Screen Awards	Best Male Debut	Company	Won	
2008	Screen Awards	Best Villain	Shootout at Lokhandwala	Nominated	
2018	SIIMA Awards	Best Actor in a Negative Role	Vivegam	Nominated	
2021	SIIMA Awards	Best Actor in a Negative Role	Vinaya Vidheya Rama	Nominated	
2021	SIIMA Awards	Best Actor in a Negative Role	Lucifer	Nominated	
2003	Stardust Awards	Superstar of Tomorrow – Male	Saathiya	Won	
2003	Stardust Awards	Superstar of Tomorrow – Male	Road	Won	
2004	Stardust Awards	Best Supporting Actor	Yuva	Won	
2008	Stardust Awards	Standout Performance of the Year	Shootout at Lokhandwala	Won	
2008	Stardust Awards	Best Actor in a Negative Role	Shootout at Lokhandwala	Nominated	
2020	Vanitha Film Awards	Best Actor in a Negative Role	Lucifer	Won	
2003	Zee Cine Awards	Best Male Debut	Company	Won	
2003	Zee Cine Awards	Best Actor in a Supporting Role – Male	Company	Won	
2008	Zee Cine Awards	Best Actor in a Negative Role	Shootout at Lokhandwala	Nominated	
