= Anti-Terrorism Squad =

Counterterrorism units of Indian Police Departments

Anti-Terrorism Squad (ATS)

Jurisdictional structure
- Operations jurisdiction: India
- Legal jurisdiction: Republic of India
- Primary governing body: State governments of India
- Secondary governing body: Police forces of the states and union territories of India

An Anti-Terrorism Squad (ATS) is an Indian special counterterrorism unit present in several state police agencies of India including Maharashtra Police, Gujarat Police, Kerala Police, Uttar Pradesh Police, Rajasthan Police, Bihar Police, Jharkhand Police,Tamil Nadu Police, Madhya Pradesh Police and Chhattisgarh Police. These units are frequently involved in the investigative, intelligence and emergency response aspects related to terrorism and cooperate with other branches of their police departments, police forces from other states, and national agencies such as the Intelligence Bureau and the National Investigation Agency.

== History ==
The first Anti-Terrorism Squad of India was founded in Maharashtra in 1990 by Aftab Ahmed Khan, then the Additional Commissioner of Police in Mumbai. He was inspired by methods used in the SWAT teams of the Los Angeles Police Department to combat terrorism. Anti-Terrorism Squads have subsequently been integrated into the police departments of numerous states, with the original ATS of Maharashtra Police being terminated and then reconstituted.

The Mumbai ATS squad has been connected with many human rights violations, from extreme torture to public shootings. Following the 1991 Lokhandwala Complex shootout and other similar encounters, the organization was terminated in January 1993. The leader of this program, A.A. Khan, was transferred from his position as the chief of Mumbai's ATD to the IGP (Anti Naxalite division) to Nagpur on 29 January 1993 following the termination of the program.

The Anti Terrorism Squad of Maharashtra Police was later reinstated in the states police department by the Government of Maharashtra, vide G.R. No. SAS-10/03/15/SB-IV, dated 8 July 2004.

== By State ==
=== Maharashtra ===
Maharashtra Police was the first police department in the country to set up an ATS unit. Although the unit was disbanded in 1993, it was later reintroduced to the state's police force in 2004 as a special unit of Maharashtra Police. In 2008 ATS chief Hemant Karkare was martyred in the line of duty fighting against terrorists in the 26/11 Mumbai attacks.The Anti Terrorism Squad of Maharashtra Police is frequently involved in combating the intelligence and investigation challenges related to terrorism but not armed anti terror operations, which are usually undertaken by other police units.

=== Uttar Pradesh ===
The Uttar Pradesh government created its own Anti-Terror Squad in 2007. Although the anti terrorism squad of U.P. generally deals with the intelligence aspects of terrorism it has been stepping up its tactical counterterrorism capabilities since 2017 with creation of tactical units called Special Police Operations Team (SPOT).

=== West Bengal ===
Kolkata Police had two anti-terrorist squads much before the police forces in Delhi and Mumbai came up with the idea. It is another matter that these two units turned out to be woefully inadequate in tackling modern-day terrorism. By the time, the administration realized this and merged them to set up the Special Task Force (STF).

== In popular culture ==
- In the 2006 Malayalam movie "Baba Kalyani (film)", Mohanlal portrays the role of an IPS officer in ATS.
- In the 2009 Malayalam movie IG, Suresh Gopi portrays the role of an officer who is the Anti-Terrorist Squad Chief.
- In the 2024 Tamil movie The Greatest of All Time, the lead characters portray the role as officers working for Special Anti-Terrorism Squad.
