= Himesh Reshammiya discography and filmography =

Works of Himesh Reshammiya

Himesh Reshammiya discography
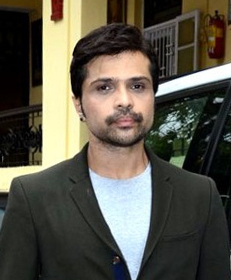
- Himesh Reshammiya in 2014
- Studio albums: 10 albums
- Soundtrack albums: 104 (including 2 upcoming releases)
- Background Scores: 9
- Lyricist: 5 films: 15 songs 5 albums
- Playback singer: 58 films (179 songs)
- As an actor: 11 films (as a lead); 6 films (special appearance in songs); 3 music albums (as model)
- As a Producer: 6 films
- As a Story Writer: 6 films
- Reality show judge: 17 shows

This is the discography and filmography of Indian singer-composer Himesh Reshammiya. The details below contains his work as a playback singer, composer, lyricist, Film producer and actor.

== Discography as music director ==
†	Denotes films that have not yet been released

=== 1990s ===
Year	Film	Directed by	Notes
1998	Pyaar Kiya To Darna Kya	Sohail Khan	"Odh Li Chunariya", "Tum Par Hum Hai"
1998	Bandhan	K. Murali Mohana Rao	"Balle Balle", "Chhora Phisal Gaye", "Tere Dum Se Hai Mera Dum"
1999	Hello Brother	Sohail Khan	"Chandi Ki Daal Par", "Teri Chunariya"

=== 2000s ===
Year	Film	Directed by	Notes
2000	Kahin Pyaar Na Ho Jaaye	K. Murali Mohana Rao	
2000	Kurukshetra	Mahesh Manjrekar	
2000	Dulhan Hum Le Jayenge	David Dhawan	
2001	Aamdani Atthani Kharcha Rupaiyaa	K. Raghavendra Rao	
2001	Jodi No.1	David Dhawan	
2002	Chalo Ishq Ladaaye	Aziz Sejawal	
2002	Yeh Hai Jalwa	David Dhawan	
2002	Humraaz	Abbas–Mustan	Nominated – Filmfare Award for Best Music Director
2002	Kyaa Dil Ne Kahaa	Sanjay Chhel	
2003	Zameen	Rohit Shetty	
2003	Tere Naam	Satish Kaushik	Winner – Screen Award for Best Music Director, Zee Cine Award for Best Music Director; Nominated – Filmfare Award for Best Music Director, Screen Weekly Award for Best Music Director, Star Guild Award for Best Music Director
2003	Footpath	Vikram Bhatt	"Soorat Pe Teri Pyar Aave"
2003	Chura Liyaa Hai Tumne	Sangeet Sivan	
2004	Dil Maange More	Anant Narayan Mahadevan	Nominated – Screen Weekly Award for Best Music
2004	Aabra Ka Daabra	Dheeraj Kumar	
2004	Aitraaz	Abbas–Mustan	Nominated – IIFA Award for Best Music Director, Zee Cine Award for Best Music Director
2004	Shukriya	Anupam Sinha	
2004	Dil Ne Jise Apna Kahaa	Atul Agnihotri	Reshammiya composed 4 songs
2004	Taarzan: The Wonder Car	Abbas–Mustan	
2004	Julie	Deepak Shivdasani	
2004	Run	Jeeva	
2004	Bardaasht	Eeshwar Nivas	
2004	Tum – A Dangerous Obsession	Aruna Raje	
2004	Ishq Hai Tumse	Krishna Ghattamaneni	
2005	Anjaane	Harry W. Fernandes	
2005	Vaah! Life Ho Toh Aisi!	Mahesh Manjrekar	
2005	Kyon Ki	Priyadarshan	
2005	Koi Aap Sa	Partho Mitra	
2005	Aashiq Banaya Aapne	Aditya Datt	Winner – Filmfare Award for Best Male Playback Singer, IIFA Award for Best Male Playback, Zee Cine Award for Best Playback Singer – Male, Bollywood Movie Award – Best Music Director, Zee Cine Awards for Best New Film Music Talent; Nominated – Filmfare Award for Best Music Director, IIFA Award for Best Music Director, Star Guild Award for Best Music Director, Zee Cine Award for Best Music Director, Screen Award for Best Music Director,
2005	Iqbal	Nagesh Kukunoor	"Aankon Mein Sapna" (not included in the film)
2005	Maine Pyaar Kyun Kiya?	David Dhawan	Nominated – Zee Cine Award for Best Music Director
2005	Silsiilay	Khalid Mohamed	
2005	Yakeen	Girish Dhamija	
2005	Main Aisa Hi Hoon	Harry Baweja	
2005	Kuchh Meetha Ho Jaye	Samar Khan	
2005	Blackmail	Anil Devgan	
2005	Insan	K. Subash	
2005	Vaada	Satish Kaushik	
2005	Nigehbaan – The Third Eye	Dilip Shankar	
2006	Rocky – The Rebel	Suresh Krissna	
2006	Dil Diya Hai	Aditya Datt	
2006	Aap Ki Khatir	Dharmesh Darshan	
2006	Ahista Ahista	Shivam Nair	
2006	Anthony Kaun Hai?	Raj Kaushal	
2006	Chup Chup Ke	Priyadarshan	
2006	Phir Hera Pheri	Neeraj Vora	
2006	Tom Dick And Harry	Deepak Tijori	
2006	36 China Town	Abbas–Mustan	
2006	Humko Deewana Kar Gaye	Raj Kanwar	"Tum Sansoon Mein"
2006	Banaras	Pankaj Parashar	
2006	Shaadi Se Pehle	Satish Kaushik	
2006	Aksar	Anant Narayan Mahadevan	Nominated – Filmfare Award for Best Music Director, Filmfare Award for Best Male Playback Singer, Zee Cine Awards for Best Track "Jhalak Dikhlaja", Zee Cine Award for Best Music Director
2007	Welcome	Anees Bazmee	"Insha Allah" and "Kola Laka Vellari"
2007	Nanhe Jaisalmer	samir Karnik	
2007	Darling	Ram Gopal Verma	"Tadap"
2007	Fear	Vikram Bhatt	
2007	Aap Kaa Surroor	Prashant Chadha	Nominated – Bollywood Movie Award – Best Music Director, Bollywood Movie Awards – Best Song for "Jhoot Nahi Bolna", Bollywood Movie Award – Best Playback Singer Male for "Tera Mera Milna"
2007	Apne	Anil Sharma	
2007	Fool & Final	Ahmed Khan	
2007	Good Boy, Bad Boy	Ashwini Chaudhary	
2007	Shakalaka Boom Boom	Suneel Darshan	
2007	Namastey London	Vipul Amrutlal Shah	
2007	Red: The Dark Side	Vikram Bhatt	
2007	Nehlle Pe Dehlla	Ajay Chandok	"Dil Naiyyo Maane Re"
2008	Karzzzz	Satish Kaushik	Remake of the 1980 film Karz.
2008	Dasavathaaram	K. S. Ravikumar	Debuted as composer in Tamil films. The soundtrack was dubbed in Telugu and Hindi.; Nominated – Vijay Award for Favourite Song for "Kallai Mattum"
2008	My Name Is Anthony Gonsalves	Eeshwar Nivas	"Tum Mile"
2009	Radio	Ishan Trivedi	100th film as music director; "Mann Ka Radio" 500th song; Nominated – Bollywood Hungama Music Awards for Best Music Director, Bollywood Hungama Music Awards for Best Singer – "Mann Ka Radio"

=== 2010s ===
Year	Film	Directed by	Notes
2010	Kajraare	Pooja Bhatt	
2010	Milenge Milenge	Satish Kaushik	
2011	Damadamm!	Swapna Waghmare Joshi	
2011	Bodyguard	Siddique	All songs except for "I Love You": Winner – BIG Star Entertainment Awards for Most Entertaining Music, BIG Star Entertainment Awards for Most Entertaining Song "Teri Meri Prem Kahani", Lions Favourite Music Director 18th Lions Gold Awards; Nominated – Zee Cine Award for Best Music Director
2012	Khiladi 786	Ashish R Mohan	Winner – Lions Favourite Path Breaking Music 19th Lions Gold Awards; Nominated – Stardust Awards for Best Music Director
2012	Son of Sardaar	Ashwni Dhir	All songs except for "Yeh Jo Halki"
2012	OMG – Oh My God!	Umesh Shukla	All songs except for "Hari Om" and "Mere Nishaan"
2012	Bol Bachchan	Rohit Shetty	All songs except for "Nachle Nachle"
2012	Dangerous Ishhq	Vikram Bhatt	
2013	A New Love Ishtory	John Matthew Matthan	Released on television
2013	Policegiri	K. S. Ravikumar	All songs except for one
2013	Shortcut Romeo	Susi Ganesan	
2013	Special 26	Neeraj Pandey	"Gore Mukhde Pe Zulfan Di Chhaavan"
2014	Action Jackson	Prabhu Deva	
2014	Kick	Sajid Nadiadwala	Composed 5 songs; "Jumme Ki Raat", Jumme Ki Raat' Version 2", "Tu Hi Tu", "Tu Hi Tu Version 2", "Tu Hi Tu (Reprise)"; Nominated – Filmfare Award for Best Music Director, BIG Star Entertainment Awards for Most Entertaining Music, Screen Award for Best Music Director, Star Guild Award for Best Music Director for "Jumme Ki Raat", Bollywood Hungama Music Award-Best Song for "Jumme Ki Raat"
2014	Humshakals	Sajid Khan	
2014	The Xposé	Anant Narayan Mahadevan	Nominated – BIG Star Entertainment Awards for Most Entertaining Music; Won – BIG Life OK Now Awards for Best Music
2015	Prem Ratan Dhan Payo	Sooraj R. Barjatya	Winner – BIG Star Entertainment Awards for Most Entertaining Music, Zee Cine Awards for Best Song of the year (Prem Ratan Dhan Payo); Nominated – Stardust Awards for Best Music Album, BIG Star Entertainment Awards for Best Song of the Year (Prem Ratan Dhan Payo)
2015	All Is Well	Umesh Shukla	"Baaton Ko Teri", "Tu Milade", "YOLO"
2016	Final Cut of Director	Bharathiraja	
2016	Teraa Surroor	Shawn Arranha	100th Film with T-Series
2016	Sanam Teri Kasam	Radhika Rao and Vinay Sapru	
2018	Genius	Anil Sharma	

=== 2020s ===
Year	Film	Directed by	Notes
2020	Happy Hardy and Heer	Raka	
2021	Radhe	Prabhu Deva	"Dil De Diya"
2022	Middle Class Love	Ratnaa Sinha	
2022	Raksha Bandhan	Anand L. Rai	
2023	Bad Boy	Rajkumar Santoshi	
2023	Kisi Ka Bhai Kisi Ki Jaan	Farhad Samji	"Naiyo Lagda"
2024	Naam	Anil Roongta	
2025	Badass Ravi Kumar	Keith Gomes	
2026	Yeh Prem Mol Liya †	Sooraj Barjatya	
2026	Gunmaaster G9 †	Aditya Datt	
2026	Maatrubhumi: May War Rest in Peace †	Apoorva Lakhia	
2027	1920 Cold Winter:Resonance †	Vikram Bhatt	

== Discography as a playback singer ==
Year	Film	Song	Co-singers
2026	Gunmaaster G9	"Afsaana Banaya Aapne"	Asees Kaur
2026	Gunmaaster G9	"Dard-E-Dil Dard-E-Jigar"	Emraan Hashmi, Akasa Singh
2026	Yeh Prem Mol Liya	"Jai Ambe Bol"	Shreya Ghoshal
2025	"Badass Ravi Kumar"	"Butterfly Titliyan" "Dil Ki Taj Mahal Mein" "Hookstep Hookah Bar" "Bazaar-E-Ishq" "Tandoori Days" "Aafato Ke Dor Me Chain Ho Tum" "Baarish" "Pani Pani Sajna" "Aaj Mehfil Mein" "Terre Pyaar Mein (Reprise 1)" "Aajaa Aajaa Pardesi" "Aajaa Piyaa" "Lut Gaye Tere Ishk Mein" "Medley" "Chand Baaliyaan" "Laila O Laila"	Sunidhi Chauhan, Shannon K Shreya Ghoshal Aditi Singh Sharma Salman Ali, Jyotica Tangri, Nitin Kumar, Sachin Kumar Valmiki, Nishta Sharma, Ankona Mukherjee Arunita Kanjilal Kavya Limaye Shreya Bajpai, Arpita Bhattacharya Divya Kumar (singer), Rupali Jagga, Sana Arora Aditi Singh Sharma, Shreya Ghoshal, Salman Ali, Jyotica Tangri, Nitin Kumar, Sachin Kumar Valmiki, Nishta Sharma, Ankona Mukherjee, Arunita Kanjilal, Kavya Limaye Sana Arora
2025	Pintu Ki Pappi	"Beautiful Sajna Beautiful"	Sunidhi Chauhan, Raman Raghuvanshi
2023	Zara Hatke Zara Bachke	"Baby Tujhe Paap Lagega"	Sachin-Jigar
2023	Bad Boy	"Janabe Ali" "Instaa Vich Story"	Vineet Singh, Aditi Singh Sharma, Asees Kaur
2022	Divine Melodies (Music Album) Music by: Late Vipin Reshammiya (Father of Himesh Reshammiya)	"Ganpati Gajaanann"	
2022	Raksha Bandhan	"Kangan Ruby" "Kangan Ruby (House Mix)"	Akasa Singh
2022	Middle Class Love	"Tuk Tuk" "Manjha"	Payal Dev; Raj Baraman
2020	Happy Hardy and Heer	"Cutie pie" "Heer Tu Meri" "Le Jaana" "Teri Meri Kahani" "Aadat" "Aashiqui Mein Teri" "Duggi" "Keh Rahi Hai Naazdeekiyan"	Anusha Mani; Navraj Hans, Harshdeep Kaur, Asees Kaur; Ranu Mondal; Ranu Mondal; Ranu Mondal; Shannon K Sameer Khan, Ranu Mondal, Payal Dev
2019	The Body	"Jhalak Dikhlaja Reloaded"	
2018	Genius	"Tujhse Kahan Juda Hoon Main"	Vineet Singh, Neeti Mohan
2018	Hate Story 4	"Aashiq Banaya Aapne (Re-make)"	Neha Kakkar
2016	Teraa Surroor	"Teri Yaad" "Teri Yaad" (Reprise) "Ishq Samundar"	Badshah; Solo; Kanika Kapoor
2016	Sanam Teri Kasam	"Bewajah" "Ek Number"	Solo; Neeti Mohan
2015	Prem Ratan Dhan Payo	"Bachpan Kahan"	Solo
2015	Hey Bro	"Naach Meri Bulbul"	Shreya Ghoshal
2014	Action Jackson	"Keeda" "Punjabi Mast" "Chichora Piya"	Neeti Mohan; Ankit Tiwari, Neeti Mohan, Arya Acharya, Alam Gir Khan & Vinit Singh; Shalmali Kholgade
2014	Humshakals	"Piya Ke Bazaar Mein" "Hum Pagal Nahi Hai"	Shalmali Kholgade, Palak Muchhal; Solo
2014	The Xposé	"Ice Cream Khaungi" "Hai Apna Dil Toh Awara" "Surroor" "Catch Me If You Can"	Yo Yo Honey Singh, Palak Muchhal; Yo Yo Honey Singh; Yo Yo Honey Singh, Shalmali Kholgade; Mika Singh, Mohit Chauhan, Neeti Mohan, Shubhangi Tiwari, Shalmali Kholgade
2014	Jai Ho	"Photocopy"	Keerthi Sagathia, Palak Muchhal
2013	A New Love Ishtory	"Jab Main Chhota Bachha Tha" "Download Kar Gaye" "Sararara"	
2013	Shortcut Romeo	"Pe Pe Pe" "Ishq Gangster" "Jave sari Duniya"	Vinit Singh; Mika Singh
2012	Khiladi 786	"Lonely" "Sari Sari Raat" "Hookah Bar"	Hamsika Iyer, Yo Yo Honey Singh, Akshay Kumar, Vinit Singh, Aman Trikha
2012	Son of Sardaar	"Son of Sardaar" "Po Po"	Aman Trikha; Vikas Bhalla, Aman Trikha
2012	OMG – Oh My God!	"Don't Worry (Hey Ram)"	Benny Dayal
2012	Bol Bachchan	"Chalao Na Naino Se" "Bol Bachchan"	Shreya Ghoshal; Amitabh Bachchan, Mamta Sharma, Abhishek Bachchan, Ajay Devgan, Vinit Singh
2012	Dangerous Ishhq	"Naina Re"	Rahat Fateh Ali Khan, Shreya Ghoshal
2011	Damadamm!	"Aaja Ve" "Tere Bina" "I Need My Space" "Umrao Jaan" "Madhushala" "Mango" "Damadamm" "Yun Toh Mera Dil" "Hum Tum" "Bhool Jaaun"	Purbi Joshi; Aditi Singh Sharma; Aditi Singh Sharma; Vinit Singh, Alam Gir Khan, Palak Mucchal, Shabab Sabri, Sabina Shaikh, Rubina Shaikh, Punnu Brar; Sadhana Sargam; Vaishali Mhade; Sachin Gupta
2010	Kajraare	"Rabba Luck Barsa" "Kajra Kajra" "Sanu Guzara" "Tujhe Dekh Ke" "Teriyan Meriyan" "Aafreen" "Woh Lamha"	Sunidhi Chauhan; Sunidhi Chauhan; Shreya Ghoshal; Shreya Ghoshal; Harshdeep Kaur; Harshdeep Kaur
2010	Milenge Milenge	"Kuch Toh Baaki Hai" "Milenge Milenge"	Shreya Ghoshal
2009	Radio	"Mann Ka Radio" "Zindagi Jaise Ek Radio" "Rafa Dafa Kiya Nahin Jaaye" "Janeman" "Koi Na Koi Chahiye" "Teri Meri Dosti Kaa Aasman" "Shaam Ho Chali Hai" "Piya Jaise Ladoo Motichur Wale" "Damadji Angana Hai Padhare"	Shreya Ghoshal; Aditi Singh Sharma; Shreya Ghoshal; Shreya Ghoshal; Shreya Ghoshal; Shreya Ghoshal; Rekha Bhardwaj; Kailash Kher
2008	Karzzzz	"Lut Jaaon Lut Jaaon" "Ek Haseena Thi" "Tandoori Nights" "Soniye Je Tere" "Tere Bin Chain Na Aave" "Dhoom Tere Ishq Ki" "Hari Om Hari Om" "Masha Allah" "Sisak Sisak Ke"	Harshdeep Kaur; Shreya Ghoshal; Sunidhi Chauhan; Tulsi Kumar; Tulsi Kumar
2008	Dasavathaaram	"Oh Oh Sanam" – Remix	Mahalakshmi Iyer
2007	Welcome	"Kola Laka Vellari"	
2007	Nanhe Jaisalmer	"Ulfat" "Ranjha" "Lamha Lamha"	Sunidhi Chauhan
2007	Darling	"Tadap"	Tulsi Kumar
2007	Fear	"Tanha Tanha"	
2007	Aap Kaa Surroor	"Assalam Vaalekum" "Tere Bina Milna" "Kya Jeena" "Tera Mera Milna" "Jhoot Nahin Bolna" "Tanhaiyaan" "Ya Ali" (Later "Dil Lagi") "Mehbooba O Mehbooba (A Tribute to Panchamda)" "Tanhaiyaan" (Unplugged) "Tera Tera Tera Surroor"	Shreya Ghoshal; Shreya Ghoshal; Sunidhi Chauhan; Sunidhi Chauhan; Asha Bhosle
2007	Apne	"Mehfooz" "Dekhoon Tujhe To Pyaar Aaye" "Ankh Vich Chehra Pyaar Da"	Akriti Kakkar; Shaan, Kunal Ganjawala, Amrita Kak
2007	Fool & Final	"Ek Kalsa" "Sigdi"	Jayesh Gandhi
2007	Good Boy, Bad Boy	"Good Boy Bad Boy" "Meri Aawargi" "Aashiqana Aalam Hai" "Dard E Dil" – Remix	Akriti Kakkar; Himani Kapoor; Alka Yagnik, Sunidhi Chauhan, Vinit Singh
2007	Shakalaka Boom Boom	"Shakalaka Boom Boom" "Dil Lagaayenge" "Naamumkin"	Akriti Kakkar; Akriti Kakkar
2007	Namastey London	"Chakna Chakna" "Viraaniya" "Yahi Hota Pyaar"	Sunidhi Chauhan
2007	Red: The Dark Side	"Aafreen Tera Chehra" "Aamin" "Dil Ne Ye Na Jaana" "Loneliness Is Killing"	Harshdeep Kaur; Akriti Kakkar
2007	Nehlle Pe Dehlla	"Dil Naiyyo Maane Re"	Tulsi Kumar
2006	Rocky – The Rebel	"Junoon" "My Love for You" "Teri Yaad Bichake Sota Hoon" "Laagi Chutte Na" "Rocky Rock the World"	Amrita Kak; Akriti Kakkar; Tulsi Kumar
2006	Dil Diya Hai	"Dil Diya" "Afsana Banake" "Mile Ho Tum To" "Yaadan Teriyan"	Himani Kapoor; Tulsi Kumar; Tulsi Kumar
2006	Aap Ki Khatir	"Aap Ki Khatir" "Afsana" "Tu Hi Mera"	
2006	Ahista Ahista	"Ahista Ahista" "Allah Kare" "Love You Unconditionally Soniye" "Aawan Akhiyan Jaawan Aankhiyaan"	Jayesh Gandhi, Aftab Hashmi Sabri
2006	Anthony Kaun Hai?	"Ishq Kiya Kiya" "No Way No Way"	Sunidhi Chauhan; KK
2006	Chup Chup Ke	"Shabe Firaq" "Dil Vich Lagiya Ve"	Tulsi Kumar; Sonu Nigam, Kunal Ganjawala, Akriti Kakkar
2006	Phir Hera Pheri	"Mujhko Yaad Sataye Teri" "Ae Meri Zohrajabeen"	
2006	Tom, Dick, and Harry	"Zara Jhoom Jhoom" "Tanha Jiya Na Jaaye" "Tere Sang Ishq"	Arya; Tulsi Kumar
2006	36 China Town	"Aashiqui Meri" "Dil Tumhare Bina"	Sunidhi Chauhan; Alka Yagnik
2006	Humko Deewana Kar Gaye	"Tum Saanson Mein"	Tulsi Kumar
2006	Banaras	"Kitna Pyar Kartein Hain"	
2006	Aksar	"Jhalak Dikhlaja" "Lagi Lagi" "Mohabbat Ki Guzarish Ho Rahi Hai"	Sunidhi Chauhan; Tulsi Kumar
2005	Aashiq Banaya Aapne	"Aashiq Banaya Aapne" "Aap Ki Kashish" "Dillagi Mein Jo Beet Jaaye"	Shreya Ghoshal; Krishna Beura, Ahir; Jayesh Gandhi, Shaan, Sonu Nigam, Sunidhi Chauhan, Vasundhara Das
2004	Bardaasht	"Janaabe Ali"	Shaan, Kunal Ganjawala
2003	Zameen	"Bas Ek Bar" (backup vocals) "Sarzameen Se" – title song (backup vocals)	Alka Yagnik, Babul Supriyo

== Discography as background music composer ==
Year	Film	Notes
2000	Kurukshetra	Debut as a composer
2008	Dasavathaaram	With Devi Sri Prasad; Tamil debut
2012	Khiladi 786	
2014	The Xposé	
2015	Prem Ratan Dhan Payo	With Sanjoy Chowdhury
2016	Teraa Surroor	
2020	Happy Hardy and Heer	
2023	Kisi Ka Bhai Kisi Ki Jaan	With Ravi Basrur and Devi Sri Prasad
2025	Badass Ravi Kumar	

== Discography as a lyricist ==
Year	Film / Album	Song	Notes
2012	Khiladi 786	"Hookah Bar"	Duet with Vineet Singh
2016	Sanam Teri Kasam	"Ek Number"	Duet with Neeti Mohan
2020	Happy Hardy and Heer	"Heer Tu Meri"	Duet with Anusha Mani
2020	Happy Hardy and Heer	"Looteri"	Co-written by Aryan Tiwari
2020	Happy Hardy and Heer	"Aashiqui Mein Teri 2.0"	Duet with Ranu Mondal. Original lyrics by Sameer
2020	Happy Hardy and Heer	"Duggi"	Duet with Navraj Hans, Shannon K and Raja Sagoo
2021	Surroor 2021	All songs	
2021	Moods with Melodies	All songs (except "Tere Bagairr", "Jhoom Baraabar Jhoom", "Designer Lehenga", "O Ranjhana")	Sung by various singers
2021	Himesh Ke Dil Se	All songs (except "Dagaa", "Agarr Tumm Naa Hote", "Jabb Se Tumko Dekhaa", "Piya Ji Ke Sanng", "Mehendi Ka Ranngg", "Bas Tum Mere Paas Raho", "Terri Aashiqui Ne Maarraa")	Sung by various singers
2021	Super Sitaara	"O Mere Channa Vey"	Sung by Shaan
2022	Middle Class Love	"Naya Pyaar Naya Ehsaas"	Sung by Jubin Nautiyal and Palak Muchhal
2022	Himesh Ke Nagme	"Pyaar Karoon"	Sung by Mohammad Faiz
2025	Badass Ravi Kumar	"Hookstep Hookah Bar"	Duet with Sunidhi Chauhan
2025	Badass Ravi Kumar	"Tandoori Days"	Duet with Aditi Singh Sharma
2025	Badass Ravi Kumar	"Pani Pani Sajna"	Duet with Arunita Kanjilal
2025	Badass Ravi Kumar	"Aaj Mehfil Mein"	Duet with Kavya Limaye
2025	Badass Ravi Kumar	"Terre Pyaar Mein (Reprise 1)"	Duet with Shreya Bajpai and Arpita Bhattacharya
2025	Badass Ravi Kumar	"Lut Gaye Tere Ishk Mein"	Solo
2025	Badass Ravi Kumar	"Medley"	Duet with Aditi Singh Sharma, Shreya Ghoshal, Salman Ali, Jyotica Tangri, Nitin Kumar, Sachin Kumar Valmiki, Nishta Sharma, Ankona Mukherjee, Arunita Kanjilal and Kavya Limaye
2025	Badass Ravi Kumar	"Chand Baaliyan"	Duet with Sana Arora
2025	Saaz	"Saaz"	Solo
2026	Gunmaaster G9	"Afsaana Banaaya Aapne"	Solo

== Solo albums ==
†	Denotes Albums that have not yet been released

Year	Album	Notes
2006	Aap Kaa Surroor	Sold 1.3 million units
2016	Aap Se Mausiiquii	
2021	Surroor 2021	Produced under Himesh Reshammiya Melodies banner
2021	Moods with Melodies	Produced under Himesh Reshammiya Melodies banner
2021	Himesh Ke Dil Se	Produced under Himesh Reshammiya Melodies banner
2021	Super Sitaara	Produced under Himesh Reshammiya Melodies banner
2022	Divine Melodies	Music by Late Vipin Reshammiya (father of Himesh Reshammiya), Lyrics by Sudhakar Sharma; Produced under Himesh Reshammiya Devotional banner.
2022	Woh Ek Mulaqaat	Music by Shameer Tandon, Lyrics by Sameer. Produced under Himesh Reshammiya Music and Melodies banner.
2022	Himesh Ke Nagme	
2022	Dheere Dheere Rafta Rafta	Music by Anand–Milind, Lyrics by Sameer. Produced under Himesh Reshammiya Music and Melodies banner.

== Theater ==
Year	Play	Notes
2011	Kennedy Bridge	Composed a Mujra number

== As an actor ==
=== Filmography as an actor ===
†	Denotes films that have not yet been released

Year	Films	Role	Notes
2005	Aashiq Banaya Aapne	Himself	Special appearance in the song "Aashiq Banaya Aapne (Remix)" in end credits
2006	Ahista Ahista	Himself	Special appearance in the song "Ahista Ahista" and "Allah Kare"
2006	Anthony Kaun Hai?	Himself	Special appearance in the song "Ishq Kiya Kiya"
2006	Tom Dick And Harry	Himself	Special appearance in the song "Tanha Jiya Na Jaye", "Tere Sang Ishq", "Zara Jhoom Jhoom" and "Zara Jhoom Jhoom (Remix)"
2006	Humko Deewana Kar Gaye	Himself	Special appearance in the song "Tum Sansoon Mein", "Tum Sansoon Mein (Remix)" and "Tum Sansson Mein (Unplugged)"
2006	Aksar	Himself	Special appearance in the song "Jhalak Dikhlaja (Remix)", "Mohabbat Ke Guzarish" and "Mohabbat Ke Guzarish (Remix)" in end credits
2007	Aap Kaa Surroor	Himesh Reshammiya / HR; an Indian Rockstar	Nominated – Filmfare Award for Best Male Debut; Nominated – Stardust Award for Superstar of Tomorrow – Male
2008	Karzzzz	Monty Oberoi; Reincarnation of Ravi Shanta Prasad Verma	
2009	Radio	RJ Vivan Shah; an RJ	
2010	Kajraare	Rajeev Behl; a Bar tender / Rocky Desai; a Singer	
2011	Damadamm!	Sameer "Sam" / Babu; a Writer	
2012	Khiladi 786	Mansukh Desai; Champaklal and Jigna's son; a Wedding Planner	Nominated – Stardust Award for Breakthrough Performance – Male
2013	A New Love Ishtory	Sikander Verma / Sukku Bhai; a Stuntsman	Released on television
2014	The Xposé	Ravi Kumar; an Ex-cop	
2016	Teraa Surroor	Raghuu; a Gangster and boyfriend of Tara	
2020	Happy Hardy and Heer	Harpreet Singh Lamba "Happy" a loser; and Harshvardhan Bhatt "Hardy" an Entrepreneur	Double role
2025	Badass Ravi Kumar	Ravi Kumar; a cop	Won – Pinkvilla Screen and Style Icons Awards – Most Iconic Entertainer

=== Music videos ===
Year	Song / Album	Songwriter	Features	Ref(s)
2006	Aap Kaa Surroor – The Album	Music: Himesh Reshammiya; Lyrics: Sameer	Appearance in all songs	
2016	Aap Se Mausiiquii	Music: Himesh Reshammiya; Lyrics: Sameer	Appearance in all songs	
2021	Surroor 2021	Music & Lyrics: Himesh Reshammiya	Featured in all songs	
2025	Saaz	Music & Lyrics: Himesh Reshammiya	himself only	
2026	Sharab	Music: Rajat Nagpal; Lyrics: Rana Sotal	Himesh Reshammiya, Manushi Chillar	

== Filmography as producer ==
Reshammiya, along with his late father Late Vipin Reshammiya, has produced and distributed films under the banner HR Musik Limited. Later in 2021, he launched his another record label, Himesh Reshammiya Melodies, to produce his music albums and in 2022, he announced his first film under this banner.

Year	Film	Notes
2011	Damadamm!	
2012	Khiladi 786	Co-produced by Hari Om Entertainment, Sunil Lulla
2014	The Xposé	
2016	Teraa Surroor	Co-produced by HR Musik Limited and T-Series
2020	Happy Hardy and Heer	Produced by HR Musik Limited and EYKA Films
2025	Badass Ravi Kumar	Producer under Himesh Reshammiya Melodies banner.

== Filmography as story writer ==
Year	Film	Notes
2011	Damadamm!	
2012	Khiladi 786	Also wrote lyrics
2014	The Xposé	Also wrote screenplay (with Jainesh Ejardar)
2016	Teraa Surroor	
2020	Happy Hardy and Heer	Also wrote lyrics
2025	Badass Ravi Kumar	

== Soundtrack discography ==
This is the list of Soundtrack albums of films which were released on Himesh Reshammiya Melodies music label.

Year	Film	Notes
2025	Badass Ravi Kumar	first film soundtracks under this Music label.
2025	Sakaal Tar Hou Dya	Marathi film.
2025	Kadhipatta	Marathi Film
2026	Yeh Prem Mol Liya †	
2026	Gunmaaster G9 †	

== Filmography as television actor ==
Show	Notes
Sa Re Ga Ma Pa Challenge 2005	As a Judge. Mentor of the Jai Mata Di Let's Rock Gharana
Sa Re Ga Ma Pa Challenge 2007	As a Judge. Mentor of the Jai Mata Di Let's Rock Gharana
Sa Re Ga Ma Pa Challenge 2009	As a Judge. Mentor of the Jai Mata Di Let's Rock Gharana
Music Ka Maha Muqqabla	contestant-captain of Himesh's Warriors along with Shreya Ghoshal, Shankar Mahadevan, Mika Singh, Shaan and Mohit Chauhan
Sur Kshetra	As a Judge and captain of team India along with Atif Aslam, Asha Bhosle, Runa Laila, Abida Parveen, Ghulam Ali, Ismail Darbar, Sajjad Ali, Suresh Wadkar and Alka Yagnik
The Voice India	As a Judge with Shaan, Mika Singh, and Sunidhi Chauhan
Dil Hai Hindustani 2	As a guest Judge – Special Episode along (with Sunidhi Chauhan, Badshah and Pritam)
Love Me India	As a Judge (with Guru Randhawa and Neha Bhasin)
Sa Re Ga Ma Pa Li'l Champs 2019	As a guest Judge (with Amaal Malik, Richa Sharma and Shaan)
Super Dancer Chapter 4	As a guest Judge (with Shilpa Shetty, Geeta Kapur (choreographer), Anurag Basu and Javed Ali)
Superstar Singer	As a Judge (with Javed Ali and Alka Yagnik)
Indian Idol 11	As a Judge, replacing Anu Malik (with Neha Kakkar and Vishal Dadlani)
Sa Re Ga Ma Pa Li'l Champs 2020	As a Judge, replacing Udit Narayan and Kumar Sanu (with Javed Ali and Alka Yagnik)
Indian Idol 12	As a Judge (with Neha Kakkar, Sonu Kakkar, Vishal Dadlani and Anu Malik)
Sa Re Ga Ma Pa: Sapnon Ki Shuruwaat	As a Judge (with Vishal Dadlani and Shankar Mahadevan)
Superstar Singer 2	As a Judge (with Javed Ali and Alka Yagnik)
Indian Idol 13	As a Judge (with Neha Kakkar and Vishal Dadlani)
Indian Idol 17	as a Solo Judge
