= Zayed Khan =

Indian actor, producer

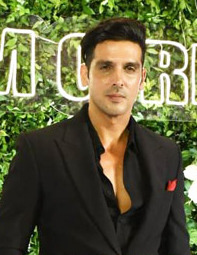
- Khan in 2023
- Born: Zayed Abbas Khan; 5 July 1980 (age 46); Bombay, Maharashtra, India
- Occupations: Actor; producer
- Years active: 2003–2018
- Spouse: Malaika Parekh (m. 2005)
- Children: 2
- Parents: Sanjay Khan (father); Zarine Khan (mother)
- Relatives: Sussanne Khan (sister); Feroz Khan (paternal uncle); Akbar Khan (paternal uncle); Fardeen Khan (paternal cousin)

Zayed Khan (born 5 July 1980) is an Indian former actor and producer who worked in Hindi films. He is the son of Bollywood actor Sanjay Khan, he has received a Filmfare Award nomination.

After graduating in Business Management at the Montgomery College and Film Making at the London Film Academy, he made his acting debut in 2003 in Chura Liyaa Hai Tumne. His other films include Main Hoon Na (2004), Shabd (2005), Dus (2005), Rocky The Rebel, (2006), Yuvvraaj (2008), Blue (2009), and Anjaana Anjaani (2010).

In 2011, the actor ventured into production with his co-owned production house, Born Free Entertainment along with friend and actress Dia Mirza and her spouse Sahil Sanga with their first film, Love Breakups Zindagi. In 2017, Khan made his television debut in the show Haasil. He has been married to Malaika Parekh since 2005, with whom he has two children.

== Early life and education ==
Khan's parents were former Bollywood actor-director Shah Abbas Khan (Sanjay Khan) and interior designer-food writer Zarine Khan (née Katrak). His father is of mixed Afghan and Iranian descent while his mother came from a Parsi family. Zayed, who was raised as a Muslim, is the youngest of four children and the only son of his parents. His elder sisters are Simone Khan (married to Ajay Arora), Sussanne Khan (ex-wife of actor Hrithik Roshan), and Farah Khan Ali (ex-wife of DJ Aqeel). Khan is the nephew of actor Feroz Khan and director Akbar Khan (brothers of Sanjay Khan) and first cousin of Bollywood actor, Fardeen Khan.

Khan attended Welham Boys' School, Dehradun, and later Kodaikanal International School, Kodaikanal, with childhood friend Esha Deol and Mallaika Parekh. He studied Business Management at the Montgomery College and Film Making at London Film Academy.

== Career ==
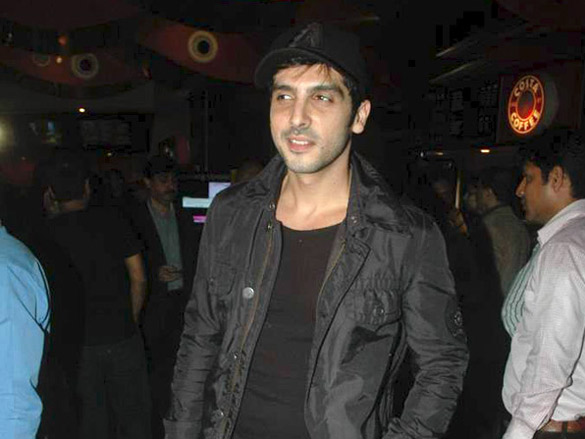
Zayed Khan at the premiere of Mod.

Khan made his screen debut in 2003 in the film Chura Liyaa Hai Tumne.

In 2004, he starred in Main Hoon Na, which was one of the biggest hits in his career. It was the second highest-grossing film of 2004 behind Veer-Zaara and was declared a hit. Khan was subsequently nominated for the Filmfare Award for Best Supporting Actor in 2005. He also starred alongside Amrita Arora in a music video called Disco 82 Remix by DJ Aqeel for UMI-10.

Khan had four releases in 2005. He played an obsessive lover in Vaada alongside Arjun Rampal and Ameesha Patel. He then starred in Shabd as a photography professor, which he was excited about because he had always wanted to do a film with Aishwarya Rai. His third release, Anubhav Sinha's action thriller Dus, where he played a cop, did well. It was Big Hit and was the third highest-grossing film of 2005. Khan's final release of the year, Shaadi No. 1, flopped at the box office.

He starred in Sohail Khan's action multi-starrer, Fight Club - Members Only in 2006. Next, he appeared in Rocky: The Rebel. Khan revealed that he had ghost-written some scenes in the film. He had first begun script-writing when he was studying in London.

Both of his films in 2007 were action multi-starrers. Anubhav Sinha's Cash was originally meant to be the sequel to Dus, but ended up differently. Due to this, some of the cast of Dus also star in Cash. It performed reasonably well in its first week, but was unable to replicate the success of Dus and was eventually declared a flop. His next film, Speed, also failed at the box office.

In 2008, Khan had the leading role as a news reporter in Apoorva Lakhia's Mission Istaanbul opposite Vivek Oberoi. He also starred in the Bollywood remake of Rain Man, Yuvvraaj with Salman Khan, Katrina Kaif and Anil Kapoor.

The following year, he featured in the underwater action thriller Blue. At the time of its release, the film broke the record for having the highest budget for a Bollywood film. It had an excellent opening weekend on Diwali, collecting ₹480 million, but was a below-average grosser. He also filmed Sharafat Gayi Tel Lene, a comedy thriller film. However, it ran into production hassles and was released in 2015.

Khan played a supporting role as an unfaithful fiancé in the 2010 Ranbir Kapoor–Priyanka Chopra starrer, Anjaana Anjaani.

In 2011, the actor ventured into production with his co-owned production house, Born Free Entertainment along with friend and actress Dia Mirza and her husband, Sahil Sanga. Their first film, Love Breakups Zindagi, was released on 7 October 2011, and was met with a lukewarm response.

In 2012, Khan played a supporting role in Tezz, which stars Anil Kapoor and Ajay Devgan in the lead.

In August 2017, Khan made his television debut on a show called Haasil playing the role of Ranvir Raichand opposite Vatsal Sheth and Nikita Dutta. The show premiered in October 2017.

== Personal life ==
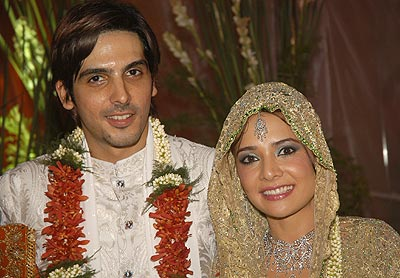
Zayed Khan and Malaika Parekh at their wedding on 20 November 2005.

Khan married his high school sweetheart Malaika Parekh on 20 November 2005. In an interview, Malaika stated that Zayed proposed four times to her and she has four rings from him. They are of exactly the same age and they both studied in Kodaikanal International School. They first became acquainted with each other in 1995.

The couple have two sons, born in 2008 and 2011. In 2008, Khan gave up smoking upon the birth of his first son, to ensure that his children grew up without accepting any bad habits as normal.

== Awards and nominations ==
List of awards and nominations received by Zayed Khan
Year	Film	Award	Category	Result
2004	Chura Liyaa Hai Tumne	Zee Cine Awards	Best Male Debut	Nominated
2004	Chura Liyaa Hai Tumne	Filmfare Awards	Best Male Debut	Nominated
2005	Main Hoon Na	Filmfare Awards	Best Supporting Actor	Nominated

== Filmography ==
=== Films ===
List of Zayed Khan film credits
Year	Title	Role	Notes
2003	Chura Liyaa Hai Tumne	Prakash Yogi / Vijay Chouhan / Vishal Malhotra	
2004	Main Hoon Na	Lakshman Prasad Sharma "Lucky"	
2005	Vaada	Karan Srivastav	
2005	Shabd	Yash Agnihotri	
2005	Dus	Aditya Singh	
2005	Shaadi No. 1	Veer Saxena	
2006	Fight Club: Members Only	Vicky Khanna	
2006	Rocky: The Rebel	Rocky Sinha	
2007	Cash	Dhananjay "Danny" Jhumbevalkar	
2007	Speed	Sandeep Arora	
2007	Om Shanti Om	Himself	Guest appearance in song "Deewangi Deewangi"
2008	Mission Istaanbul	Vikas Sagar	
2008	Yuvvraaj	Danny Yuvvraaj	
2009	Blue	Sameer "Sam" Singh	
2010	Anjaana Anjaani	Kunal Nanda	
2011	Love Breakups Zindagi	Jai Malhotra	Also producer
2012	Tezz	Aadil Khan	
2015	Sharafat Gayi Tel Lene	Prithvi Khurana	

=== Television ===
Zayed Khan television credits
Year	Title	Language	Role
2017–2018	Haasil	Hindi	Ranveer Raichand
