= Tanushree Dutta =

Indian actress and model (born 1984)

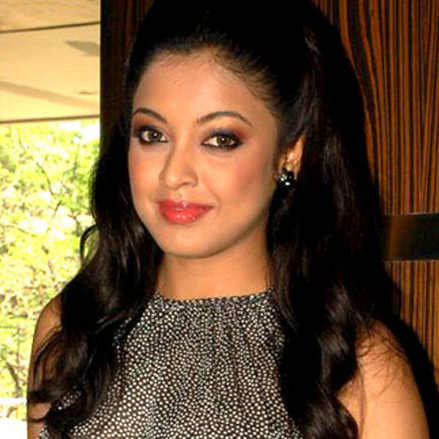
- Dutta in 2012
- Born: 19 March 1984 (age 42); Jamshedpur, Bihar (present-day Jharkhand), India
- Occupations: Model; Actress
- Relatives: Ishita Dutta (younger sister)
- Beauty pageant titleholder
- Title: Femina Miss India Universe 2004
- Years active: 2005–2010, 2013
- Major competitions: Femina Miss India Universe 2004 (Winner); Miss Universe 2004 (Top 10)

Tanushree Dutta (pronounced [t̪ənʊʃri]; born 19 March 1984) is an Indian former actress, model and beauty pageant titleholder who won Femina Miss India Universe 2004 and then represented her country at Miss Universe 2004 in Ecuador where she placed Top 10.

Dutta has appeared in mostly Hindi films from 2005 to 2010. Some of her best known films includes Aashiq Banaya Aapne, Bhagam Bhag and Dhol. In September 2018, after having been out of the Bollywood spotlight for several years, Dutta gave an interview to Zoom TV in which she accused Nana Patekar of sexually harassing her on the sets of the 2009 film Horn 'Ok' Pleassss. It was a catalyst for the "Me Too" movement in India.

== Personal life ==
Dutta was born in Jamshedpur, Jharkhand, India, on 19 March 1984 into a Bengali Hindu family. As of September 2018, Dutta is a permanent resident of the US.

Dutta has dated Aditya Datt. Ishita Dutta Sheth is her younger sister.

In an interview in 2013, she said that she hit depression after being traumatized on the sets of Horn 'Ok' Pleassss. She took a break and tried recuperation using eastern spirituality. Initially, she stayed at an ashram for one and a half years. Then, she went to Ladakh where she learned Buddhist meditation. She also practices Vipassana meditation.

== Career ==
In 2004, Dutta won the Femina Miss India pageant held in Mumbai. As a result, she represented India at the Miss Universe 2004 Pageant which took place in Quito, Ecuador, where she was placed as the sixth runner-up.

She made her debut in Tamil cinema in Theeratha Vilayattu Pillai and her Bollywood début in 2005, appearing in Chocolate and Aashiq Banaya Aapne. In 2006 she also appeared in the song "Jab Kabhi" in 36 China Town.

== Me Too Movement ==
On 26 September 2018, Dutta gave an interview to Zoom TV in which she accused Nana Patekar of sexually harassing her on the sets of the 2009 film Horn 'Ok' Pleassss. This was a catalyst for the "MeToo" movement in India. It was not until her September 2018 statements that the CINTAA apologized to Dutta, admitting that the "chief grievance of sexual harassment wasn't even addressed [in 2008]" but added that since the case was more than three years old, they could not reopen it.

She also alleged that filmmaker Vivek Agnihotri had told her to remove her clothes and dance with Irrfan Khan to act on the sets of Chocolate (2005). She said Khan and Sunil Shetty stood up for her during this episode. Agnihotri refuted all allegations and shared that it is an attempt to get publicity by Dutta and to malign his image in a legal notice sent to her. The assistant director of Chocolate, Sattyajit Gazmer, also dismissed Dutta's claims.

In another interview, Dutta said, "He [Patekar] called the MNS party to bash up my car. He was behind everything and was supported by choreographer Ganesh Acharya." In a video from 2008 that went viral on the internet, it was seen the journalists and not the MNS were seen thrashing Dutta's car. A journalist named Pawan Bharadwaj was seen thrashing the car's windshield with his camera, who later clarified that he attacked her car because he had a fight with Dutta's team prior to the incident.

Mahrashtra Navnirman Sena filed a defamation case against Dutta. She was also served with two legal notices from Patekar and Agnihotri. Subsequently, on 6 October, Dutta filed an FIR at Oshiwara police station against Patekar; director of Horn 'Ok' Pleassss, Rakesh Sarang; choreographer Acharya and producer Sami Siddiqui.

On 13 October 2018, Dutta's advocate Nitin Satpute submitted an application at the Oshiwara police station in Mumbai saying that actor Nana Patekar, choreographer Ganesh Acharya, producer Samee Siddiqui and director Rakesh Sarang be made to undergo narco-analysis, brain mapping and lie detector tests.

In June 2019, Patekar was cleared of the sexual harassment charges by the police. The B-Summary report filed by the Oshiwara police station in Mumbai said that the complaint filed by Tanushree could be "malicious" and "out of revenge". in 2024, Dutta slammed Hema Committee report for not reporting Nana Patekar.

== Filmography ==
=== Film ===
Year	Title	Role(s)	Notes	Ref.
2003	Anahat	Dasi	Marathi film	
2005	Aashiq Banaya Aapne	Sneha Pariyar		
2005	Veerabhadra	Malathi	Telugu film	
2005	Chocolate: Deep Dark Secrets	Simran Khemu		
2006	Bhagam Bhag	Anjali Singh		
2006	36 China Town	Ayesha Dutta	Special appearance in song "Jab Kabhi"	
2007	Raqeeb: Rivals in Love	Sophie Matthews	Hindi dubbed voice by Mona Ghosh Shetty	
2007	Dhol	Ritu Tripathi		
2007	Risk	Shraddha		
2007	Good Boy, Bad Boy	Dinky Kapur		
2007	Speed	Sanjana Shah		
2008	Saas Bahu Aur Sensex	Nitya Sen		
2010	Ramaa: The Saviour	Samara		
2010	Theeradha Vilaiyattu Pillai	Jyothi	Tamil film	
2010	Rokkk	Anushka		
2010	Apartment	Preeti Sengupta		
2013	SuperCops Vs Super Villains	Reshma		

== Awards and nominations ==
Year	Film	Award	Category	Result
2006	Aashiq Banaya Aapne	Stardust Awards	Superstar of Tomorrow – Female	Nominated
2006	Aashiq Banaya Aapne	Star Screen Awards	Best Female Debut	Nominated
2006	Aashiq Banaya Aapne	Filmfare Awards	Best Female Debut	Nominated
2006	Aashiq Banaya Aapne	International Indian Film Academy Awards	Star Debut of the Year – Female	Nominated
2006	Aashiq Banaya Aapne	Zee Cine Awards	Best Female Debut	Nominated
2006	Chocolate: Deep Dark Secrets	Zee Cine Awards	Best Female Debut	Nominated

Preceded by Nikita Anand	Miss India Universe; 2004	Succeeded by Amrita Thapar
