= Shiva 143 =

Indian Kannada film

- Directed by: Anil Kumar
- Based on: RX 100 (Telugu)
- Produced by: Jayanna-Bhogendra; Dr.Suri
- Starring: Dheeren Ramkumar; Manvitha Kamath
- Music by: Arjun Janya
- Release date: 26 August 2022
- Country: India
- Language: Kannada

Shiva 143 is a 2022 Indian Kannada-language romantic action drama film directed by Anil Kumar. The film stars Dheeren Ramkumar and Manvitha Kamath in pivotal roles. It is the remake of the Telugu movie RX 100. The film is produced by Jayanna, Bhogendra, and Dr. Suri under Jayanna Films banners. Arjun Janya composed the film's soundtrack and background score.

Shiva 143 was released on 26 August 2022 and received positive reviews from critics.

== Plot ==
Shiva is a well-behaved man in a small village located in Karnataka, who meets Madhu, the daughter of a local politician Narasimha and they fall for each other. One day, Madhu tells Shiva that her father is planning to get her married to the guy named Mahesh and she tells him that they should not meet until she convinces her father.

Fearing that Narasimha wouldn't accept their love, Shiva asks Appaji to convince Narasimha to get them married. On the way to Narasimha's house, Appaji meets with an accident and has been admitted in the hospital. Narasimha disapproves of their love and gets Madhu married to Ashok an NRI against her wishes and sends her to US. Shiva is also thrashed by Narasimha's goons when he tried to stop Madhu's wedding. Enraged about losing Madhu, Shiva develops aggressiveness and starts destroying Narasimha's business. Shiva learns that Madhu has returned from US and creates a ruckus twice in front of her house.

Appaji tells Chikka, Shiva's friend that when he had gone to Narasimha's house, he had overheard the conversation between him and Madhu. To his and Narasimha's shock, Madhu confesses that she was in love with Ashok. Narasimha accepts Madhu's love thinking that Ashok would be better than Shiva. After Appaji left the place, he met with an accident. It is revealed that Madhu never loved Shiva, but used him to satisfy her sexual desire. She is a very self-absorbed woman who uses people for her needs and is predatory in her actions. Even though Narasimha knows the truth about Madhu and chastises her for it, he still continues to harm Shiva for her sake. Narasimha sends his men to warn Shiva not to see Madhu until she and her husband Ashok leave for US, but Madhu bribes them to kill Shiva.

One of Narasimha's men stabs and reveals about Madhu to Shiva, who confronts Madhu and curses her that her life is on his mercy and she is going to live with guilt forever. After this, Shiva dies leaving Appaji devastated.

== Cast ==
- Dheeren Ramkumar as Shiva
- Manvitha Kamath as Madhu
- Avinash as Narasimha, Madhu's Father
- Charan Raj as Appaji, Shiva's Adoptive Father
- Shobaraj
- Chikkanna as Chikka, Shiva's Friend
- Bala Rajwadi
- Sadhu Kokila
- Puneeth Rudranag

== Soundtrack ==
Shiva 143

Soundtrack album by Arjun Janya
- Released: 30 August 2022
- Recorded: 2022
- Studio: YRF Studios, Mumbai; YN Music Studio, Dubai; Czech TV Music Studio, Prague
- Genre: Kannada Film Music
- Length: 11:34
- Language: Kannada
- Label: Anand Audio
- Producer: Arjun Janya

The music and original score was composed by Arjun Janya. The songs were written by Kraanthi Kumar, Anil Kumar, Sahith & Garuda Ram.

Shiva 143 (Original Motion Picture Soundtrack)
| No. | Title | Lyrics | Music | Singer(s) | Length |
|---|---|---|---|---|---|
| 1. | "Male Haniya" | Kraanthi Kumar | Arjun Janya | Nihal Tauro & Prithvi Bhat | 03:25 |
| 2. | "Nanthak Baa" | Anil Kumar | Arjun Janya | Mangli, Aniruddha Sastry, Santhosh Venky & Chetan Naik | 04:24 |
| 3. | "Shiva 143 Title Track" | Sahith | Arjun Janya | Nishan Rai | 03:49 |
| 4. | "Preethiya Paricheya" | Garuda Ram | Arjun Janya | Rajesh Krishnan | 03:40 |
| Total length: | | | | | 15:33 |

== Release ==
The film was released on 26 August 2022 in theatres.

== Reception ==
Muralidhara Khajane of The Hindu wrote "To summarise, Shiva 143 has plenty of glamorous scenes, tears, and lots of blood and violence, but the essence of the film is lost somewhere in the enthusiasm of makers to please disappointed lovers of the current generation, who blame women for all their problems with love."

A Sharaadha of Cinema Express gave 3 out of 5 stars and wrote "Shiva 143, is a decent launch for Dheeren Ramkumar, who scores high with his very first attempt at becoming the next big star from the Rajkumar family."
