= Jennifer Mayani =

Chilean actress and model

- Born: 29 August 1979 (age 46); Punta Arenas, Chile
- Occupations: Actress, model
- Years active: 2005–2010

Jennifer Mayani is a Chilean model and actress who works primarily in Bollywood movies. She made her career in 2005 with the Hindi film Dus. She is of Indian Sindhi origin.

== Filmography ==
- 2005 Dus
- 2007 Good Boy, Bad Boy as Jenny
- 2007 Heyy Babyy as Supermarket Girl
- 2007 Om Shanti Om
- 2007 Jaane Bhi Do Yaaron
- 2008 Bhram as Model 3
- 2009 Victory
- 2010 Apartment as Item Girl
- 2010 Golmaal 3
