= Gunmaaster G9 =

2026 Indian Hindi-language action thriller film

- Theatrical release poster
- Directed by: Aditya Datt
- Written by: Sarim Momin; Junaid Wasi
- Produced by: Deepak Mukut; Hunar Mukut; Sangeeta Ahir
- Starring: Emraan Hashmi; Genelia Deshmukh; Aparshakti Khurana
- Cinematography: Keiko Nakahara; Anik R. Verma
- Edited by: Devendra Murdeshwar
- Music by: Songs: Himesh Reshammiya; Score: Vikram Montrose
- Production companies: Soham Rockstar Entertainment; SRE Studios
- Distributed by: Pen Marudhar (India); Phars Film (Overseas)
- Release date: 27 November 2026
- Country: India
- Language: Hindi

Gunmaaster G9 is an upcoming Indian Hindi-language action romantic thriller film directed by Aditya Datt and written by Sarim Momin and Junaid Wasi. Produced by Deepak Mukut, Hunar Mukut, and Sangeeta Ahir under Soham Rockstar Entertainment and SRE Studios, the film stars Emraan Hashmi in the titular role alongside Genelia Deshmukh and Aparshakti Khurana. The project marks a creative reunion between Hashmi, Datt, and composer Himesh Reshammiya nineteen years after their 2007 romantic/comedy Good Boy, Bad Boy.

Gunmaaster G9 is scheduled for a worldwide theatrical release on 27 November 2026.

== Premise ==
Agent Eshwar, operating under the codename "Agent G9", is a secret operative who navigates a dangerous underworld of firearms, espionage, and personal conflict while confronting a ruthless antagonist.

== Cast ==
- Emraan Hashmi as Agent Eshwar / Agent G9
- Genelia Deshmukh as Aarti
- Aparshakti Khurana as Desu
- Abhishek Singh
- Snehil Dixit Mehra
- Samarth Jurel (special appearance)

== Production ==
=== Development ===
Gunmaaster G9 was conceived as a commercial action-masala spy thriller paying homage to the titular spy character originally popularised by Mithun Chakraborty in Surakksha (1979) and Wardat (1981). Produced by Deepak Mukut, Hunar Mukut, and Sangeeta Ahir under Soham Rockstar Entertainment and SRE Studio, the project was developed to reunite actor Emraan Hashmi, director Aditya Datt, and music composer Himesh Reshammiya two decades after Aashiq Banaya Aapne (2005). Screenplay and dialogue duties were handled by Sarim Momin and Junaid Wasi.

=== Casting ===
Emraan Hashmi was cast in the lead role of Agent Eshwar (Agent G9), marking a return to an action-romance persona combined with contemporary espionage elements. Genelia Deshmukh was signed as the female lead, Aarti, in her first on-screen collaboration with Hashmi. Aparshakti Khurana was cast against type as the primary antagonist, Desu. In July 2025, former bureaucrat-turned-actor Abhishek Singh joined the supporting ensemble. In early November 2026, television actor Samarth Jurel joined the project for a special cameo appearance, marking his feature film debut.

=== Filming ===
Principal photography took place across Mumbai, Uttarakhand, and Delhi. The Mumbai schedule included an extensive multi-day vehicular action sequence—during which Hashmi narrowly escaped injury on 10 October 2026 when a car flip stunt went awry—while outdoor schedules in the hills of Uttarakhand were used for romantic tracks and dramatic sequences. Khurana officially wrapped up his portions of the shoot on 14 October 2026.

== Music ==
Gunmaaster G9

Soundtrack album by Himesh Reshammiya
- Recorded: Himesh Reshammiya Melodies Studio
- Venue: Mumbai
- Studio: Himesh Reshammiya Melodies
- Genre: Feature film soundtrack
- Language: Hindi
- Label: Himesh Reshammiya Melodies
- Producer: Meghdeep Bose

Himesh Reshammiya chronology
Yeh Prem Mol Liya (2026)	Gunmaaster G9 (2026)	Maatrubhumi: May War Rest in Peace (2026)

Singles from Gunmaaster G9
- 1. "Afsaana Banaya Aapne" Released: 23 September 2026; 2. "Do Din Ki Zindagi" Released: 14 October 2026; 3. "Dard-E-Dil Dard-E-Jigaar" Released: 30 October 2026; 4. "Gunmaaster G9 Title Track" Released: 19 November 2026

The film's soundtrack is composed by Himesh Reshammiya and released under his music label, Himesh Reshammiya Melodies, with lyrics penned by Sonia Kapoor Reshammiya and Junaid Wasi.

The first single, "Afsaana Banaaya Aapne", sung by Reshammiya and Asees Kaur, was released on 23 September 2026. The second single, "Do Din Ki Zindagi", featuring vocals by Reshammiya, Shreya Ghoshal, and Vishal Mishra, was released on 14 October 2026. A third single, "Dard-E-Dil Dard-E-Jigar", performed by Reshammiya and Akasa Singh, was released on 30 October 2026.The fourth single, "Gunmaaster G9 (Title Track)", is composed by Vikram Montrose with lyrics written by Farooq Qaiser, Bassick and sung by Bassick, Bappi Lahiri, Annette Pinto, Vikram Montrose which is recreated version of Gunmaster G-9 from 1979 film Surakksha.

All music is composed by Himesh Reshammiya.

Track listing
No.	Title	Lyrics	Singer(s)	Length
1.	"Afsaana Banaaya Aapne"	Himesh Reshammiya	Himesh Reshammiya, Asees Kaur	5:27
2.	"Do Din Ki Zindagi"	Junaid Wasi	Shreya Ghoshal, Vishal Mishra	5:38
3.	"Dard-E-Dil Dard-E-Jigar"	Sonia Kapoor Reshammiya	Emraan Hashmi, Himesh Reshammiya, Akasa Singh	5:24
4.	"Gunmaaster G9 (Title Track)" (Composed by Vikram Montrose)	Farooq Qaiser, Bassick	Bassick, Bappi Lahiri, Annette Pinto, Vikram Montrose	2:28

== Marketing ==
The project was officially announced on 9 July 2025 by Soham Rockstar Entertainment via a series of character-reveal motion posters introducing Emraan Hashmi as Eshwar, Genelia Deshmukh as Aarti, and Aparshakti Khurana as Desu, accompanied by a background score snippet by Himesh Reshammiya. On 17 August 2026, the makers released a theatrical release date announcement poster confirming the 27 November 2026 date. Official first-look character stills and posters were unveiled on 24 August 2026, followed by the official teaser on 25 August 2026. Subsequent promotional campaigns centered on the staggered release of three music videos between September and October 2026.The film's trailer was released on 11 November 2026.

== Release ==
=== Theatrical ===
While the producers initially considered a Dussehra release window in October 2026, Gunmaaster G9 was officially scheduled for a worldwide theatrical release on 27 November 2026. It is set to clash at the box office with Sooraj Barjatya's family drama Yeh Prem Mol Liya.

=== Distribution ===
In October 2026, Pen Marudhar acquired the all-India theatrical distribution rights for the film following a competitive bidding war in a deal valued at over ₹35 crore (US$3.7 million). On 10 October 2026, the Phars Film secured an overseas theatrical distribution deal ahead of its November release.
