= Vikram Chopra =

Indian actor, director, and screenwriter

Vikram “Vicky” Chopra is an Indian film director, screen writer and actor. He is the nephew of Indian filmmaker Vidhu Vinod Chopra.

== Career ==
He has acted in the Bollywood films Bada Din, Kareeb, Sangharsh, Mission Kashmir and Kasoor and in television serials A Mouthful of Sky, Bheja Fry, X Zone, Samandar, Khushi.

He directorial debut was with the film Fight Club: Members Only. He is currently working on another motion picture titled Season's Greetings. He is the head of Vikram Chopra Productions.

== Filmography ==
- Bada Din (1998)
- Kareeb (1998)
- Sangharsh (1999)
- Mission Kashmir (2000)
- Kasoor (2001)
- Khushi (2003)
- Fight Club: Members Only (2006) (Director)
- Bheja Fry (2007)

Television

- Fauji (1989)
- Samandar (1995–1996)
- A Mouthful of Sky (1995)
- X Zone (1998–2000)
