= Fight Club: Members Only =

2006 Indian film by Vikram Chopra

- Promotional poster
- Directed by: Vikram Chopra
- Written by: Mayur Puri (Additional dialogues)
- Screenplay by: Sohail Khan; Vikram Chopra
- Story by: Sohail Khan
- Produced by: Sohail Khan; Ravi Walia
- Starring: Sunil Shetty; Sohail Khan; Zayed Khan; Dino Morea; Ritesh Deshmukh; Aashish Chaudhary; Rahul Dev; Dia Mirza; Amrita Arora
- Cinematography: Sudeep Chatterjee; Sanu John Varghese
- Edited by: Rameshwar S. Bhagat
- Music by: Songs: Pritam Chakraborty; Background Score: Salim Sulaiman
- Production company: Sohail Khan Productions
- Release date: 17 February 2006
- Running time: 145 mins
- Country: India
- Language: Hindi
- Budget: ₹ 8.25 crore
- Box office: ₹ 8.88 crore

Fight Club: Members Only is a 2006 Indian Hindi-language action thriller film directed by Vikram Chopra and produced by Ravi Walia and Sohail Khan. The film features an ensemble cast of Suniel Shetty, Sohail Khan, Zayed Khan, Dino Morea, Ritesh Deshmukh, Aashish Chaudhary, Rahul Dev, Dia Mirza and Amrita Arora with Ashmit Patel, Yash Tonk, Kulbhushan Kharbanda and Neha Dhupia appear in supporting roles. Its plot borrows heavily from the 1999 American film Fight Club.

== Plot ==
The story follows four friends, Vicky, Karan, Somil and Diku. The four often attend clubs and drink alcohol together. One night, they witness a physical brawl, and Vicky comes up with the idea of making a "Fight Club," in which the participants will be allowed to fight physically but with valid reason. The night when the Fight Club is opened, Somil learns that his uncle, who brought him up and currently lives in Delhi, has met some troubles. Some local gangsters want to take over the club of Somil's uncle to use it for drugs smuggling. After being firmly rejected, they threatened to kill him. Somil then leaves for Delhi to help his uncle, leaving the other three boys running the Fight Club in Mumbai.

When Mohit, a college youngster, enters the club and takes part in a fight, he ends up beating his opponent severely to critical condition. After being stopped by Vicky, Mohit attacks him, to which response Vicky throws him out of the club. The scene is caught by several police officers, they arrest Mohit and seal the Fight Club, but others manage to escape and select a new place to keep running the Fight Club. After Mohit is released, he arrives with Anna's old gangster friends to get revenge, but is rejected by the latter.

Anna, Mohit's older brother is released from prison where he stayed for 8 years and visits Mohit to see if he has changed himself from keeping fighting and working for gangsters, Anna tells Mohit that the reason he quit the gangster group and handed himself to the police was that he wanted to set a good example for Mohit. He then takes Mohit to Delhi for vacation.

Vicky, Karan and Diku keep running the Fight Club. One night, Vicky's past classmate Sameer shows up in the club to challenge Vicky. Sameer almost beats Vicky, but police arrives in the scene, making all of them escape. The new place is sealed again by police, and the three friends decide to give it up and go to Delhi to visit Somil.

Somil's uncle was killed by gangsters before the three arrive. The four then take over Somil's uncle's club Crossroads to reopen it, but the gangsters almost destroy it again in the first night after its reopening. The four then decide to hire a bouncer to protect their club from being destroyed again, and Vicky comes up with the idea of hiring Sameer. Sameer rejects at first, but later shows up when the four are fighting with the gangster group and saves them and joined them in running the club.

While staying in Delhi, Mohit cheats Anna by telling him that he will go back to Mumbai to attend college but instead going to meet his old gangster friends Sandy and Dinesh, who killed Somil's uncle. Anna coincidentally meets Sandy and Dinesh, the two then invite Anna to come back to their gangster group again but are rejected by Anna. Dinesh comes up with idea to get Anna back.

Mohit meets Diku, making him aware that the four of them are also in Delhi. Dinesh takes Mohit to Crossroads for revenge, but lets Mohit enter alone. When Mohit is beaten by the five of them, Dinesh doesn't help or even show up, Moreover, he kills Mohit soon after he's beaten, making Vicky and his friends naturally blamed, and the five of them are arrested for murder but are soon bailed by Vicky's father, in exchange, Vicky agrees with his father to return to Mumbai with him, Soon enough, Anna finds out about this incident, and plans to avenge Mohit with his whole crew.

Vicky develops a romantic relationship with Anu, Karan's younger sister, and Karan falls in love with his neighbour Sonali. As the friends get a phone call they realize that Anna has captured Somil and Dikku. Karan and Sameer rush to save them, but beaten in a fight with Sandy and Dinesh. Vicky then arrives to help his friends and is knocked down. Somil then realizes that Dinesh was the one who killed Mohit with a small screwdriver after seeing the same marking on his uncle's body after he was murdered.

Somil exposes Dinesh, allowing Vicky and his friends to gain the upper hand to defeat the gangsters. Enraged, Dinesh tries to kill him with the same weapon, but Anna saves Somil and kills Dinesh. Sandy is left devastated as Anna, Vicky, Sameer, Somil, Karan and Dikku return to the bar. Ultimately, Anna befriends the five and the Crossroads club is converted into a regular nightclub.

== Cast ==
- Suniel Shetty as Anna Shetty
- Sohail Khan as Sameer Kapoor
- Zayed Khan as Vicky Khanna
- Dino Morea as Karan Chopra
- Ritesh Deshmukh as Somil Gandhi
- Aashish Chaudhary as Dikku Patel
- Ashmit Patel as Dinesh Vidyarthi
- Rahul Dev as Sandy Vidyarthi
- Yash Tonk as Mohit Shetty
- Dia Mirza as Anu Chopra
- Amrita Arora as Sonali Malhotra
- Neha Dhupia as Dr. Komal
- Kulbhushan Kharbanda as Suhas Gandhi (guest appearance)
- Puneet Vashisht as Sapru
- Murali Sharma as Police Inspector
- Kamal Chopra as Mr.Khanna
- Vikrant Anand as Fighter

== Music ==
Fight Club

Soundtrack album by Pritam Chakraborty
- Released: 27 December 2005 (Digital Release); 17 February 2006 (Film)
- Genre: Feature Film soundtrack
- Length: 33:36
- Label: T-Series
- Producer: Pritam Chakraborty

Pritam Chakraborty chronology
Ek Khiladi Ek Haseena (2005)	Fight Club (2005)	Gangster (2006)

=== Track list ===
Songs for Fight Club: Members Only were composed by Pritam Chakraborty, and the lyrics were written by Mayur Puri and Neelesh Misra.

All music is composed by Pritam Chakraborty.

Track listing
No.	Title	Lyrics	Singer(s)	Length
1.	"Yeh Khuda"	Mayur Puri	K.K	5:04
2.	"Chhore ki baatein"	Mayur Puri	Shweta Pandit & Amit Kumar	4:46
3.	"Joshile Java Ho"	Mayur Puri	Shweta Pandit	5:03
4.	"Bolo Na Tum Zara"	Neelesh Misra	Shaan & Shreya Ghoshal	5:17
5.	"Chhore Ki Baatein" (Remix)	Mayur Puri	Shweta Pandit & Amit Kumar	4:25
6.	"Yeh Khuda" (Remix)	Mayur Puri	K.K	3:57
7.	"Bolo Na Tum Zara" (Remix)	Neelesh Misra	Shaan & Shreya Ghoshal	5:04
Total length:				33:36

== Reception ==
Jaspreet Pandohar of BBC.com gave the film 2 out of 5, writing ″While Brad Pitt and Edward Norton brought brains and brawn to the table and helped carry their Fight Club to its final dark twist, Chopra's leading men and adapted storyline take the safe route by using their secret society to tackle a powerful adversary. The outcome is an amusing, but poorly executed, flick that packs a light punch.″

Rujuta Paradkar of rediff.com called it a "shamelessly copied Hindi version" of Fight Club. She further wrote, "If the first half of the film is based on the Fight Club concept, the second half deviates too much. So much masala -- including a complex revenge plot -- is added that you almost think you have accidentally walked back to the wrong theatre after the interval."
