= Karenjit Kaur – The Untold Story of Sunny Leone =

Indian web series

- Poster
- Genre: Biography
- Based on: The Life story of- Sunny Leone
- Screenplay by: Karan Shrikant Sharma (season 1 & 2); Niranjan Kaushik (season 1)
- Directed by: Aditya Datt
- Starring: Sunny Leone; Bijay Anand; Grusha Kapoor; Raj Arjun; Karamvir Lamba
- Theme music composer: Rachita Arora
- Composers: Anurag Shanker (season 1); Tallz (season 2)
- Country of origin: India
- No. of seasons: 3
- No. of episodes: 20

Production
- Executive producers: Sanjay Mehta(season 1); Sudhir Narayan Sherigar (season 2); Shahnawaz Iqbal Dabhoiwala (season 2)
- Producers: Kishor Arora; Akash Chawla; Shareen Mantri Kedia; Arunava Sengupta
- Cinematography: Keiko Nakahara (season 1); Priya Seth (season 2)
- Editors: Jitendra Prakash Dongare (season 1); Sandeep Kurup (season 2)
- Running time: approx. 20 - 25 mins
- Production companies: Namah Pictures; Fresh Lime Films

Original release
- Release: 16 July 2018 – 21 May 2019

Karenjit Kaur – The Untold Story of Sunny Leone is a Hindi-language streaming television series. The series captures the journey of former pornstar-turned-actor Sunny Leone, born in a middle-class Sikh family, and her makeover from being an innocent girl to an adult film actress and eventually a Bollywood star. The twenty-episode series premiered on ZEE5 on 16 July 2018 in multiple languages, including Malayalam, Bengali, Tamil, Telugu, Kannada and Marathi.

== Description ==
The biopic features Raj Arjun, Rysa Saujani, Karamvir Lamba, Bijay Jasjit Anand, Grusha Kapoor, Vanish Pradhan, and Marc Buckner. Karenjit tells her story on her own terms, in her distinctive style—one without regrets. It covers everything from her reasons for entering the adult industry, to her choice of the name Sunny, her meeting with her husband, and insights into the industry itself.

Directed by Aditya Datt and written by Karan Sharma, the series reveals her history, family, and boyfriend-turned-husband Daniel Webber, and explores lesser-known aspects of her transformation from an adult film star to a popular actress.

The show was primarily shot in Cape Town and Mumbai. The shoot was over by May 2018.

== Cast ==
- Sunny Leone as herself
- Rysa Saujani as Young Karenjit
- Bijay J. Anand as Jaspal Singh Vohra
- Grusha Kapoor as Balwant Kaur Vohra
- Raj Arjun as Anupam Chaubey, a news anchor
- Karamvir Lamba as Sundeep
- Vansh Pradhan as Young Sundeep
- Marc Buckner as Daniel Weber : Karenjit's Husband.
- Johan Badh as Nate
- Joanna Robaczewska as Tanya
- Ritu Shivpuri as Neena, Jaspal Singh Vohra's love interest
- Manoj Singh Panwar as Manager

== Episodes ==
Series	Episodes	Originally released
1	10	16 July 2018
2	6	18 September 2018
3	4	5 April 2019

=== Season 1 ===
No. overall	No. in season	Title	Directed by	Written by	Original release date
1	1	"Talking Tough"	Aditya Datt	Karan Shrikant Sharma	16 July 2018
2	2	"City of No Angels"	Aditya Datt	Karan Shrikant Sharma	16 July 2018
3	3	"Virgin Mary"	Aditya Datt	Karan Shrikant Sharma	16 July 2018
4	4	"Taking the Plunge"	Aditya Datt	Karan Shrikant Sharma	16 July 2018
5	5	"Birth of Sunny Leone"	Aditya Datt	Karan Shrikant Sharma	16 July 2018
6	6	"The Devil Wears Nothing"	Aditya Datt	Karan Shrikant Sharma	16 July 2018
7	7	"As Bad As It Gets"	Aditya Datt	Karan Shrikant Sharma	16 July 2018
8	8	"Love at First Sight"	Aditya Datt	Karan Shrikant Sharma	16 July 2018
9	9	"The Black Sheep"	Aditya Datt	Karan Shrikant Sharma	16 July 2018
10	10	"A New Chapter Begins"	Aditya Datt	Karan Shrikant Sharma	16 July 2018

=== Season 2 ===
No. overall	No. in season	Title	Directed by	Written by	Original release date
11	1	"Beat around the Bush"	Aditya Datt	Karan Shrikant Sharma	18 September 2018
12	2	"Guilty of Doing It our way"	Aditya Datt	Karan Shrikant Sharma	18 September 2018
13	3	"Is It Happily Ever After?"	Aditya Datt	Karan Shrikant Sharma	18 September 2018
14	4	"The Princess and The Frogs"	Aditya Datt	Karan Shrikant Sharma	18 September 2018
15	5	"The Last Wish!"	Aditya Datt	Karan Shrikant Sharma	18 September 2018
16	6	"Time to Say Goodbye"	Aditya Datt	Karan Shrikant Sharma	18 September 2018

=== Season 3 ===
No. overall	No. in season	Title	Directed by	Written by	Original release date
17	1	"Born to be a Chef!"	Aditya Datt	Karan Shrikant Sharma	5 April 2019
18	2	"Princess Finds Her Prince"	Aditya Datt	Karan Shrikant Sharma	5 April 2019
19	3	"It’s Time to Grow Big!"	Aditya Datt	Karan Shrikant Sharma	5 April 2019
20	4	"Flight to India…"	Aditya Datt	Karan Shrikant Sharma	5 April 2019

== Reception ==
First Post made a statement that the screenplay of the series is cleverly written and portrayed Karenjit's life perfectly. The writer did a great job by not implying the sexual references and focus more on other aspects of her life. Sunny Leone's performance in her own life story is applaudable as she had to live her life and relive all the good and bad experiences all over again.

Hindustan Times rated the series with 3/5 stars. The main focus of the story is on the girl raised in a conservative Sikh household and her journey from becoming an adult star and entering Bollywood. The series displays her story with a bit of a melodrama that gives it the feel of a daily soap. The actors in the webseries nonetheless, play it subtly.

The Indian Express says that the webseries was surprisingly a smooth ride. They were also critical about a few melodramatic scenes with few moments of poor acting. The series show parts were one can understand that Leone has always been the dignified and hard-working individual she is admired for today. However, Leone hardly has any screen time in the pilot of the series, and she did perform well on screen.

The Quint reviewed the series, which received quite favorable responses in its first season. This season primarily explores various aspects of Leone's love life. However, the new season is much more interesting. Notably, all six episodes of season two only feature snippets of Leone's porn career. While the web series does not boast the best production values, the second season remarkably makes Karenjit feel more human than ever.
