= Yeh Prem Mol Liya =

Upcoming 2026 Hindi film directed by Sooraj Barjatya

- Theatrical release poster
- Directed by: Sooraj Barjatya
- Written by: Sooraj Barjatya
- Produced by: Kamal Kumar Barjatya; Ajit Kumar Barjatya; Mahaveer Jain
- Starring: Ayushmann Khurrana; Sharvari
- Cinematography: Manoj Kumar Khatoi
- Edited by: Shweta Venkat Mathew
- Music by: Songs: Himesh Reshammiya; Background Score: George Joseph
- Production companies: Rajshri Productions; Mahaveer Jain Films
- Distributed by: Yash Raj Films
- Release date: 27 November 2026
- Running time: 173 minutes
- Country: India
- Language: Hindi
- Budget: ₹70 crore
- Box office: ₹127.5 crore (Pre-release)

Yeh Prem Mol Liya is an upcoming Indian Hindi-language romantic family drama directed by Sooraj Barjatya and produced by Kamal Kumar Barjatya, Ajit Kumar Barjatya and Mahaveer Jain under Rajshri Productions and Mahaveer Jain Films. The film stars Ayushmann Khurrana and Sharvari in the lead roles, with Anupam Kher, Supriya Pathak, Seema Pahwa, Saumya Tandon, Shaad Randhawa and Swanand Kirkire in supporting roles.

The film is produced by Rajshri Productions in association with Mahaveer Jain Films and features music composed by Himesh Reshammiya. It is scheduled to be released theatrically on 27 November 2026.

== Cast ==
- Ayushmann Khurrana as Prem Mishra
- Sharvari as Purva Solanki
- Anupam Kher
- Shaad Randhawa
- Supriya Pathak
- Seema Pahwa
- Swanand Kirkire as Ved Mishra, Prem's father
- Geeta Agarwal Sharma
- Saumya Tandon
- Surbhi Tiwari
- Shruti Seth
- Krish Rao
- Ashnoor Kuckreja

== Production ==
=== Development ===
Following his 2022 film Uunchai, director Sooraj Barjatya began work on a new family-oriented romantic film. Early reports indicated that the project was being developed under the tentative title Prem Ki Shaadi. In August 2025, reports stated that Barjatya had developed a new story for Ayushmann Khurrana, who was set to play the character of Prem. The project was subsequently retitled Yeh Prem Mol Liya.

The film marks Khurrana's first collaboration with Barjatya and his first portrayal of Barjatya's character Prem. Sharvari was cast opposite him, marking their first film together. The film is a collaboration between Rajshri Productions and Mahaveer Jain Films. Barjatya's previous theatrical film, Uunchai, was also produced under the Rajshri banner. The production also reunites Barjatya with composer Himesh Reshammiya, who previously composed the soundtrack for Prem Ratan Dhan Payo (2015).

=== Casting ===
Ayushmann Khurrana was cast as Prem, making him the 6th bollywood actor to play Prem in Barjatya films after Salman Khan, Hrithik Roshan, Abhishek Bachchan, Shahid Kapoor, and Sonu Sood.

Salman Khan is the only actor who portrayed Prem in several Barjatya films, including Maine Pyar Kiya, Hum Aapke Hain Koun..!, Hum Saath-Saath Hain and Prem Ratan Dhan Payo.

Sharvari was cast as the female lead opposite Khurrana. The supporting cast includes Anupam Kher, Supriya Pathak, Seema Pahwa, Saumya Tandon, Shaad Randhawa, Swanand Kirkire, Krish Rao and Ashnoor Kuckreja.

=== Filming ===
Principal photography began on 1 November 2025. The first schedule was filmed in Kandivali, Mumbai, and included a large-scale musical sequence featuring the principal cast and approximately 200 background dancers.

The subsequent schedule was planned at Mehboob Studios in Mumbai, with the production aiming to complete principal photography by January 2026. By September 2026, the film's shoot had been completed.

== Music ==
Yeh Prem Mol Liya

Soundtrack album by Himesh Reshammiya
- Recorded: Himesh Reshammiya Melodies Studio
- Venue: Mumbai
- Studio: Himesh Reshammiya Melodies
- Genre: Feature film soundtrack
- Language: Hindi
- Label: Himesh Reshammiya Melodies
- Producer: Himesh Reshammiya

Himesh Reshammiya chronology
Badass Ravi Kumar (2025)	Yeh Prem Mol Liya (2026)	Gunmaaster G9 (2026)

Singles from Yeh Prem Mol Liya
- 1. "Yeh Prem Mol Liya - Title Track" Released: 20 September 2026; 2. "Jai Ambe Bol" Released: 29 September 2026; 3. "Jhumka Patola" Released: 15 October 2026; 4. "Saawan Aaya Hai" Released: 3 November 2026; 5. "Bulaye Chhathi Maa" Released: 12 November 2026; 6. "Tum Jeene Ki Wajah Ho" Released: 14 November 2026

The film's music is composed by Himesh Reshammiya. The project marks Barjatya and Reshammiya's reunion after their previous collaboration on Prem Ratan Dhan Payo. Though Reshammiya has composed seven songs for the film, the film will consist of six traditional songs as featured in Barjatya's other previous films. The film's music rights were also acquired by Reshammiya's music label Himesh Reshammiya Melodies. The title song, "Yeh Prem Mol Liya", was released on 21 September 2026, sung by Shreya Ghoshal and Nihal Tauro, and written by Kumaar. The song depicts wedding rituals, family gatherings and festive celebrations involving the lead characters. The second song, "Jai Ambe Bol", was released on 29 September 2026. The musical devotional track is a worship of Amba devi, featuring Garba dance, performed by the lead characters and a host of background artists. The third song, "Jhumka Patola", an old-school celebration complete with traditional attire and an expansive courtyard setup, set against a decorated festive backdrop featuring ensemble family members, was released on 15 October 2026.The fourth song "Saawan Aaya Hai " was released on 3 November 2026.The fifth song titled "Bulaye Chhathi Maa" was released on 12 November 2026, ahead of the Chhath Puja, which was sung by Shreya Ghoshal, Keshav Anand and written by Manoj Muntashir.

=== Track listing ===
Track listing
No.	Title	Lyrics	Singer	Length
1.	"Yeh Prem Mol Liya" (Title Track)	Kumaar	Shreya Ghoshal, Nihal Tauro	5:06
2.	"Jai Ambe Bol"	Mayur Puri	Himesh Reshammiya, Shreya Ghoshal	5:48
3.	"Jhumka Patola"	Sonia Kapoor Reshammiya	Shreya Ghoshal	4:46
4.	"Saawan Aaya Hai"	Mayur Puri	Shreya Ghoshal, Keshav Anand	4:21
5.	"Bulaye Chhathi Maa"	Manoj Muntashir	Shreya Ghoshal, Keshav Anand	6:09
6.	"Tum Jeene Ki Wajah Ho"	Kumaar	Vishal Mishra	5:43
7.	"Kudi Gujarat Di (Remake)"	Jasbir Jassi	Madhubanti Bagchi, Palak Muchhal, Himesh Reshammiya, Yo Yo Honey Singh, Jasbir Jassi, Guru Randhawa	5:56
8.	"Yeh Prem Mol Liya" (Reprise)	Kumaar	Ayushmann Khurrana	TBA

== Marketing ==
Film's lead actor Ayushmann Khurrana and Sharvari joined Falguni Pathak's garba dance programme to promote the film. The duo also performed on the film's garba track "Jai Ambe Bol" Khurrana also attended and sang title track with Himesh Reshammiya at the Bombay Music Project to promote the film. The lead casts and the director also appeared as guests in the singing reality show Indian Idol Legends Return, judged by Reshammiya himself. The whole casts also appeared to promote the film in the The Great Indian Kapil Show.

== Release ==
Yeh Prem Mol Liya is scheduled for a theatrical release in India on 27 November 2026. It is set to clash at the box office with Aditya Datt's action drama Gunmaaster G9.

Rajshri Productions and Mahaveer Jain Films announced the release date in April 2026, when they described the film as a family entertainer and a Himesh Reshammiya musical.

=== Distribution ===
Yash Raj Films acquired the worldwide theatrical distribution rights.
