= Apartment (film) =

- Film poster
- Directed by: Jag Mundhra
- Written by: Jagmohan Mundhra
- Produced by: Nari Hira; Vikram Hira
- Starring: Anupam Kher; Tanushree Dutta; Rohit Roy; Neetu Chandra
- Cinematography: Uday Tiwari
- Edited by: Jagmohan Mundhra
- Music by: Bappa Lahiri
- Distributed by: Magna Films
- Release date: 23 April 2010
- Running time: 100 minutes
- Country: India
- Language: Hindi
- Box office: INR 12.5 million

Apartment is a 2010 Indian Hindi-language thriller film directed by Jag Mundhra. The film stars Rohit Roy, Anupam Kher, Tanushree Dutta and Neetu Chandra in the lead roles. The film was released on 23 April 2010, under the banner of Magna Films. It is loosely based on the American thriller film Single White Female (1992).

== Plot ==
Preeti Sengupta (Tanushree Dutta) is an air hostess living with her boyfriend Karan Malhotra (Rohit Roy). They share a nice 2BHK apartment in the northern suburbs of Mumbai and are befriended by their elderly neighbor, Madhusudan Tanha (Anupam Kher), a struggling poet and lyricist. Tanha is a loner living with his only companion, a Persian cat whom he lovingly calls Shehzadi.

Preeti is possessive and has trust issues. When she mistakenly suspects her boyfriend to be unfaithful, she throws him out of the house, but soon realizes she can't afford the apartment rent on her own. On the advice of a fellow airhostess, she advertises for a tenant to share her apartment. Enter Neha Bhardwaj (Neetu Chandra), a modest small-town girl asking for accommodation. Impressed by her simplicity and respectful behavior, Preeti believes she has found the perfect roommate. The two girls soon become close; their camaraderie leads them to become companions.

Then things begin to go wrong. Preeti's seemingly normal life is thrown off gear, with a series of incidents that take her by surprise. Is it just a coincidence, or is someone deliberately causing all the trouble? Is Neha really as simple as she seems? In the grip of mystery, unforeseen and gruesome events, and murder at its heinous best, the truth seems shocking as it unfolds. As Neha and Preeti are torn apart by suspicion, deceit, and betrayal, the question is - what is really going on?

== Cast ==
- Rohit Roy as Karan Malhotra
- Anupam Kher as Madhusudan Tanha
- Tanushree Dutta as Preeti Sengupta
- Neetu Chandra as Neha Bhardwaj
- Bobby Darling
- Mushtaq Khan
- Nassar Abdulla as Inspector Javed Sheikh
- Jennifer Mayani as an item number
- Udita Goswami (Guest appearance)

== Soundtrack ==
No.	Title	Singer(s)	Length
1.	"Candy Man"	Sunidhi Chauhan, Bid Lo
2.	"Yeh Hai Mumbai"	Sonu Nigam
3.	"Ankhiya Na Maar"	Shilpa Rao
4.	"O Jaane Jaan Jaan"	Shaan, Sunidhi Chauhan
5.	"Ghar Dil Mein"	Shreya Ghoshal, Javed Ali
6.	"O Jaane Jaan Jaan"	Shaan
7.	"Ankhiya Na Maar" (Remix)	Shilpa Rao
8.	"Yeh Hai Mumbai" (Remix)	Sonu Nigam
9.	"Candy Man" (Remix)	Sunidhi Chauhan, Bid Lo
