= Sharafat Gayi Tel Lene =

2015 indian film directed by Gurmmeet Singh

- Movie Poster
- Directed by: Gurmmeet Singh
- Screenplay by: Vivek Chaudhary; Rajesh Chawla
- Produced by: Devinder Jain; Akhilesh Jain
- Starring: Zayed Khan; Rannvijay Singh; Tina Desai
- Music by: Meet Bros Anjjan; Dhruv Dhalla; Sandeep Chatterjee; Akshay Raheja; Faridkot Band
- Production company: Trinity Group
- Distributed by: SPE Films India
- Release date: 16 January 2015
- Running time: 108 minutes
- Country: India
- Language: Hindi

Sharafat Gayi Tel Lene (transl. Nobility has gone away for a long time) is a 2015 Indian Hindi comedy thriller film directed by Gurmmeet Singh and produced by Devinder Jain and Akhilesh Jain. It features Zayed Khan, Rannvijay Singh and Tina Desai in lead roles. The screenplay is written by Anand Kumar and Rajesh Chawla with the dialogue credited to Rajesh Chawla and Vivek Chaudhary.

It was released in India on 16 January 2015.

== Plot ==
Prithvi Khuranna (Zayed Khan), a middle class working professional, has to work hard in order to survive in the city and also to pay the landlord's rent plus other 'unavoidable' expenses until one day he discovers that his account has been credited with 100 crores (i.e. 1 billion rupees)! Finding this hard to believe, he calls up the bank's customer care where he hears that his account has been upgraded to the 'platinum class'. Before this news can sink in his system, he gets a call from an unknown number with the caller claiming to be the notorious gangster Dawood. Dawood then "orders" Prithvi to get into a mutually profitable deal with him where he has to deliver large sums of money at different times and places to Dawood's henchwoman lady Rasheeda (Talia Bentson).

Prithvi immediately calls up his roommate Sam (Rannvijay Singh), who thrives on women and money (easy money, to be precise), to share the news with him. Just as the duo is busy planning what to do with the whopping amount of money, the bank's Vice President D.K. Thawani (Anupam Kher) shows up on his doorstep to offer his personalised service to his 'esteemed customer'. All of this startles Prithvi to no end. Seeing Prithvi behave 'abnormally', his ever-so-concerned girlfriend Megha (Tina Desai), who is a TV journalist by profession, immediately calls her top-cop uncle G.S. Chaddha (Yuri Suri) who then starts tracking Prithvi's phone calls. Prithvi's confidence levels take a downturn when he discovers that D.K. Thawani is actually Dawood's man in the disguise of a bank manager. Just when things are getting settled down, life again takes an upturn for Prithvi when he hears the breaking news about Dawood's sudden death on the TV channels. Needless to say, Dawood's death means that Prithvi becomes the sole owner of the remaining 600 million in his bank account.

Prithvi tells the whole story to Megha and they both decide to go to police the next day but Sam convinces them to enjoy and party for once before returning all the money. While at the club Prithvi gets a call from Dawood and Megha gets abducted only to be found unconscious in Prithvi's car. Shocked by this incident Sam confesses to them that the calls from Dawood were fake and were made by Rasheeda (whose real name is Rachel). Sam has actually won an online lottery from a link send by Rachel but by using Prithvi's Debit card. On winning the prize money of 1 billion the whole amount got transferred in Prithvi's bank account. Hence Sam and Rachel faked the Dawood calls to get all the money back from him.

By now Sam has found out that D.K. Thawani and Rachel are planning to kill him as well after they get all the money. They also realise that the lottery site is a fake and it was all a money laundering scheme which was devised by business tycoon Ram Sharan Oberoi to transfer black money to India. Prithvi and Sam realise they are in trouble as they will be soon interrogated by RBI and Police for transferring black money to India.

Prithvi then makes a plan and together they abduct Rachel. Then Prithvi makes a fake call (pretending to be Oberoi) to Thawani and steals all the money from his house. Later Prithvi goes to Thawani's office and records his confession on a hidden camera which results in Thawani and Oberoi being arrested. The film ends with Prithvi getting 20 million reward money from the government but just as he thinks it is all over, he receives a call from the real Dawood...

== Cast ==
- Zayed Khan as Prithvi Khurana
- Rannvijay Singh as Sam
- Tina Desai as Megha
- Talia Bentson as Rashida/Rachel
- Anupam Kher as the bank's Vice President D.K. Thawani
- Yuri Suri as G.S. Chaddha

== Soundtrack ==
Sharafat Gayi Tel Lene

Soundtrack album by Meet Bros Anjjan, Dhruv Dhalla, Sandeep Chatterjee, Akshay Raheja, Faridkot Band
- Released: 21 November 2014
- Genre: Feature film soundtrack
- Length: 14:16
- Language: Hindi
- Label: Zee Music Company
- Producer: Meet Bros

Meet Bros Anjjan, Dhruv Dhalla, Sandeep Chatterjee, Akshay Raheja, Faridkot Band chronology
Singham Returns (2014)	Sharafat Gayi Tel Lene (2014)	Ek Paheli Leela (2015)

=== Track listing ===
No.	Title	Lyrics	Music	Singer(s)	Length
1.	"Selfiyaan"	Kumaar	Meet Bros. Anjjan	Meet Bros, Khushboo Grewal, Shehroz khan	02:57
2.	"Dekh Le Kismat Yaar"	Manoj Yadav	Dhurv Dhalla	Jaspreet Jasz, Pinky Maidasani & Dhruv Dhalla	03:06
3.	"Dil Ka Funda"	Tejpal Singh Rawat	Sandeep Chatterjee	Jubin Nautiyal, Talia Bentson	04:37
4.	"Sharafat Gayi Tel Lene"	IP Singh	Akshay Raheja & Faridkot	IP Singh	04:22

== Reception ==
Saurabh Dwivedi of the India Today wrote "If you are looking for a concoction of action, romance and humour in small dozes, then the Sharafat Gayi Tel Lene is a perfect average time pass for you." Shubha Shetty Saha of Mid-Day gave the film 2 out of 5 stars, writing "The best thing about this film is its short duration. Otherwise, it is just a huge disappointment.
