= Zafar Karachiwala =

Indian actor

Zafar Karachiwala is an Indian tv and theatre actor. He is most widely known for starring as Rafay in the television programme Hip Hip Hurray aired on Zee TV.

== Films ==
- Zakhm (1998)
- Manasarovar (2004) as George
- Chai Pani Etc (2004) as Satya Kumar
- Bye Bye Miss Goodnight (2005) as Rocky
- A Mighty Heart (2007) male guest-1
- Superstar (2008) as journalist
- Ek Tho Chance (2009)
- Delhi Belly (2011)
- Rashmi Rocket (2021)

== Personal life ==
Karachiwala is married to Ahlam Khan, who is the daughter of actor Amjad Khan.
