= Speed (2007 film) =

- Poster
- Directed by: Vikram Bhatt
- Written by: Vikram Dhamija
- Produced by: Pammi Baweja
- Starring: Zayed Khan; Sanjay Suri; Urmila Matondkar; Aftab Shivdasani; Aashish Chaudhary; Tanushree Dutta
- Cinematography: Pravin Bhatt
- Edited by: Hemal Kothari
- Music by: Pritam
- Production company: Baweja Movies
- Distributed by: Zee Motion Pictures (India); Eros International (Overseas)
- Release date: 19 October 2007
- Running time: 103 minutes
- Country: India
- Language: Hindi

Speed is a 2007 Indian Hindi-language action thriller film directed by Vikram Bhatt and produced by Pammi Baweja. It stars Zayed Khan, Sanjay Suri, Urmila Matondkar, Aftab Shivdasani, Aashish Chaudhary and Tanushree Dutta, with Sophie Choudry, Suhasini Mulay, Rajendranath Zutshi and Ashwini Kalsekar in supporting roles, and Amrita Arora in a special appearance. The film was released on 19 October 2007.

Speed is an unofficial remake of the 2004 American film Cellular, reimagined in an international espionage setting. The plot follows multiple characters in London whose lives intertwine as they become entangled in a terrorist conspiracy targeting the Indian Prime Minister.

== Plot ==
In Kuala Lumpur, an MI6 agent is pursued by gangsters and manages to send a coded message—"EQUINOXA 666007"—to MI5 moments before being shot dead. Though the gangsters believe the secret is safe, the agent's finger inadvertently sends the message.

On 22 September in London, Sandeep "Sandy" Arora arrives from India to reconcile with his estranged girlfriend Sanjana. He befriends a Pakistani taxi driver named Iqbal and heads to Sanjana's hotel, where he tries to convince her to return to India and marry him.

Elsewhere in London, chef Siddharth "Sid" Verma is revealed to be a covert MI5 agent. He is summoned by his superior, James, who informs him of the coded S.O.S. email sent from Kuala Lumpur. Sid is tasked with decoding the message, which is believed to warn of an imminent terrorist attack.

Meanwhile, Sid's wife Richa, a schoolteacher, is kidnapped from their home by Kabir Khan and his associate Monica Monteiro. MI5 determines that the code "EQUINOXA" refers to the autumnal equinox—22 September, the present day. Kabir contacts Sid, reveals he is watching him, and uses Richa's captivity to coerce him into following instructions.

Sid is ordered to deliver money to a location. Richa, trying to call for help, accidentally connects to Sandy, who becomes involved. Though initially dismissed by the police, Sandy commits to helping her. Kabir later targets Sid's son, Bobby, and Richa pleads with Sandy to protect him. Sandy and Sanjana attempt to reach Bobby's school, but Kabir abducts the boy first.

Meanwhile, Rohan Nath, a security officer overseeing the Indian Prime Minister Gayatri Devi's visit to London, is revealed to be a traitor working with Kabir. When Rohan's girlfriend, Sameera, discovers his plan, he kills her. He later covers up the murder while continuing to serve as the PM's security liaison.

Sandy uncovers a clue from Richa—a bracelet labeled "Princess Daisy"—and traces it to a burned-down stable where she and Bobby are held. Sanjana rescues Bobby, and Richa escapes after learning that Kabir intends to use Sid to assassinate the PM.

Sid is taken to a hotel, where Kabir and Rohan reveal their plan: Sid is to shoot the PM or risk losing his family. Kabir claims he turned against India after he and his brother were imprisoned in Pakistan and abandoned by the Indian government, leading to his brother's death.

Sandy and Richa confront Rohan, who pretends to help but reveals his true allegiance. Rohan leads Richa to Sid's room and sends a henchman to kill Sandy. However, Sandy overhears Kabir talking in the lobby and recognizes him from an earlier phone call. Hiding in a restroom, Sandy learns the true mastermind is Raaj, the PM's son, who orchestrated the plot to gain sympathy votes and succeed his mother.

Sandy is captured but escapes after defeating Kabir's men. He rushes to the hotel room and stops Sid from shooting the PM just in time. The bullet misses, and the PM is unharmed. Raaj accidentally incriminates himself and is arrested. Sid subdues and kills Rohan in a knife fight.

In a final confrontation, Sandy fights Kabir, eventually killing him by dropping a chandelier on him.

Two months later, Sandy is honored by the Prime Minister for his bravery. He marries Sanjana, while Sid and Richa resume a peaceful life with their son.

== Cast ==
- Zayed Khan as Sandeep Arora (Sandy)
- Urmila Matondkar as Richa Verma
- Sanjay Suri as Siddharth Verma (Sid)
- Aftab Shivdasani as Kabir Khan
- Aashish Chaudhary as Rohan Nath
- Tanushree Dutta as Sanjana Shah
- Amrita Arora as Sameera Mehra (Sam)
- Sophie Chaudhary as Monica Montero
- Suhasini Mulay as Indian Prime Minister Gayatri Sinha
- Rajendranath Zutshi as Raaj Sinha
- Ashwini Kalsekar as Pam
- Rajesh Khera as Iqbal Qureshi
- Yaseen Choudhry as Bobby Verma
- Richard Harris as Police Officer Ian Cook

== Soundtrack ==
The music of the film was composed by Pritam, and lyrics were written by Mayur Puri.

=== Soundtrack list ===
- Tikhi Tikhi - Joi Barua
- Wanna Wanna (Be with you forever) - Sunidhi Chauhan and Shaan
- Loving You - Sonu Nigam and Antara Mitra
- Hello - Shaan and Sunidhi Chauhan

== Reception ==
Taran Adarsh of IndiaFM gave the film 2.5 out of 5, writing, ″SPEED belongs to two actors primarily—Urmila Matondkar and Zayed Khan. Urmila handles her part with dexterity and adds freshness to the goings-on since she has cut down on her acting assignments. Zayed is cool and suits the role well. Aashish Chowdhary springs a surprise. In fact, the actor is getting likable with every release. Sanjay Suri is a fine actor, but the spark is missing this time. Aftab too isn't fiery enough and his look is a complete put-off. Tanushree Dutta needs to go easy on her makeup, otherwise she's passable. Sophie Chaudhary makes her presence felt. Amrita Arora looks glamorous. On the whole, SPEED is an interesting thriller that has the advantage of being a solo release." Rajeev Masand gave the film zero out of 5, writing ″It's one big zero for Vikram Bhatt's Speed, it's one those films that make you wish you hadn't stepped into the cinema at all.″ D. Morgan of Rediff.com gave the film 1 out of 5, writing ″If someone calls you to see this film even for free, hang up!″
