= Ek Tho Chance =

- Theatrical release poster
- Directed by: Saeed Akhtar Mirza
- Story by: Saeed Akhtar Mirza
- Produced by: Rangita Pritish Nandy; Rajat Kapoor
- Starring: Amrita Arora; Purab Kohli; Ali Fazal; Vijay Raaz; Pawan Malhotra; Ashwini Kalsekar; Rajat Kapoor; Vinay Pathak
- Cinematography: Sandeep Patil
- Edited by: Shan Mohammed
- Music by: Ismail Darbar
- Distributed by: Pritish Nandy Communications
- Release date: December 2009 (Film Festival of Kerala)
- Running time: 2 hours
- Country: India
- Language: Hindi

Ek Tho Chance is a 2009 Indian thriller film directed by Saeed Akhtar Mirza and produced by Rangita Pritish Nandy under Pritish Nandy Communications. The film's music is composed by Ismail Darbar. The film stars Amrita Arora, Purab Kohli, Ali Fazal, Pawan Malhotra, Vijay Raaz, and others. It premiered at the 2009 Film Festival of Kerala.

== Plot ==
The film tells the tale of Mumbai city and the millions who get off the train at VT station at every second of the day, hoping to latch on to the magic of Mumbai.

== Cast ==
- Amrita Arora as Nishi
- Purab Kohli
- Ali Fazal as Smridh
- Vijay Raaz
- Pawan Malhotra
- Zafar Karachiwala
- Ashwini Kalsekar
- Rajat Kapoor
- Saurabh Shukla
- Vinay Pathak
- Imaad Shah
