= Rocky (2006 Indian film) =

2006 Indian film by Suresh Krisna

Rocky – The Rebel
- Theatrical release poster
- Directed by: Suresh Krissna
- Written by: Janak-Hriday (dialogues)
- Story by: Posani Krishna Murali
- Based on: Raghavendra (2003) by Suresh Krissna
- Produced by: Narendra Bajaj
- Starring: Zayed Khan; Isha Sharvani; Minissha Lamba; Rajat Bedi
- Cinematography: K. Raj Kumar
- Edited by: Sanjib Dutta
- Music by: Himesh Reshammiya
- Production companies: Siddhi Vinayak Creations; Venus Records & Tapes
- Release date: 22 September 2006
- Running time: 119 minutes
- Country: India
- Language: Hindi
- Budget: ₹9.25 crore
- Box office: ₹3.04 crore

Rocky – The Rebel is a 2006 Indian action drama film directed by Suresh Krisna. The film stars Zayed Khan, Isha Sharvani, Minissha Lamba and Rajat Bedi. The film revolves around a young man Rocky, who cannot withstand injustice and gets into fights. However, he finds himself in trouble after involving himself with a gangster. It is an official remake of the Telugu film Raghavendra (2003).

== Plot ==
In Mumbai, the short-tempered Rocky frequently fights injustice, eventually running afoul of the criminal Anthony after putting his brother in the hospital. In retaliation, Anthony murders Rocky’s girlfriend, Neha. Ostracized by his horrified family and threatened by Anthony, Rocky relocates to London with his parents to leave his violent past behind, pacified by his father's lie that Anthony faces execution.

Living as a passive recluse in London, Rocky even ignores a cry for help from his friend Priya. However, his former ally Vikram arrives and reveals the truth: Anthony killed the eyewitnesses and walked free. Fuelled by a desire for vengeance, Rocky returns to Mumbai with his parents. Arranging a showdown at the very site of Neha’s murder, Rocky brutally defeats Anthony in a climactic brawl. On the verge of delivering the fatal blow, a vision of Neha's spirit intervenes, moving Rocky to spare Anthony's life and walk away.

== Cast ==
- Zayed Khan as Rocky Sinha
- Isha Sharvani as Neha Krantikari
- Minissha Lamba as Priya Mathur
- Rajat Bedi as Anthony D'Silva
- Suresh Menon as Professor Bhimsen Krantikari: Neha's Brother
- Sarath Babu as Ajay Sinha: Rocky's father
- Smita Jaykar as Rocky's mother

== Track listing ==
Rocky

Soundtrack album by Himesh Reshammiya
- Released: 2006
- Venue: Mumbai
- Genre: Feature film soundtrack
- Label: T-Series
- Producer: Himesh Reshammiya

Himesh Reshammiya chronology
Vaada (2005)	Rocky (2006)	Dil Diya Hai (2006)

Lyrics by Sameer.

Song title	Singer(s)
Dil Rang Le	Sunidhi Chauhan, Vinit Singh
Dil Rang Le (Remix)	Sunidhi Chauhan, Vinit Singh
Junoon Junoon	Himesh Reshammiya, Amrita Kak
Laagi Chutte Na	Himesh Reshammiya
My Love For You	Himesh Reshammiya, Akriti Kakkar
Rocky Rock The World	Himesh Reshammiya
Teri Yaad Bichake Sota Hoon	Himesh Reshammiya, Tulsi Kumar
Tanhaai	Tulsi Kumar
Kandhe Ka Woh Til	Sachet Tandon
Sajna Ve	Vishal Mishra

== Critical reception ==
Tenzin Thargay from Rediff rated the film 2 out of 5, stating "it has nothing to offer". Taran Adarsh from Bollywood Hungama, rated the film 1 out of 5, writing, "ROCKY is an outdated concept with nothing except action to fall back upon."
