= Red: The Dark Side =

2007 Indian film by Vikram Bhatt

- Movie poster
- Directed by: Vikram Bhatt
- Written by: Manoj Tyagi
- Produced by: Sunil Chainani
- Starring: Aftab Shivdasani; Celina Jaitly; Amrita Arora; Sushant Singh
- Cinematography: Pravin Bhatt
- Music by: Himesh Reshammiya
- Release date: 9 March 2007
- Running time: 108 minutes
- Country: India
- Language: Hindi

Red: The Dark Side is a 2007 Indian Hindi-language romantic thriller film directed by Vikram Bhatt. It stars Aftab Shivdasani, Celina Jaitly, Amrita Arora and Sushant Singh in the pivotal roles.

== Plot ==
Neil Oberoi is a lonely billionaire with a serious heart condition and needs a heart transplant. He finds a donor who has left behind the beautiful widow Anahita Saxena. Anahita tells him that her husband Anuj Saxena (the donor) had an affair with her friend Ria, but when he changed his mind and decided to get back to Anahita, Ria couldn't bear it and threatened to kill both of them. And that Ria is responsible for his death, and she's vulnerable because Ria's friend Rocky harasses her. Ria enters the house. Anahita tries to kill Ria, but Neil stops her. In this dilemma, Neil passionately kisses her. He leaves with guilt. They meet again, and Anahita slaps him. But they both admit their lust for each other and end up having sex for hours. One night after having sex, Neil murders Rocky to protect his lady. Neil rapes Anahita; however, it turns consensual. After the incident, Arshad ACP Abhay Rastogi finds a watch belonging to Neil and starts suspecting him. Neil and Anahita try their best to save themselves from police.

Meanwhile, Neil tries to kill Ria, but then it is revealed that Anahita is the real culprit who killed her husband because he wanted to leave her and marry Ria. Anahita couldn't bear it, and she plotted to kill her husband through Rocky and made it look like an accident. After learning that Anahita had been betraying him for his manliness and lust and used him for sex, Neil gets heartbroken and baffled. He tells Anahita that he has poisoned her drink. She goes mad at him and runs away from the house in fear. While driving on the road, she meets an accident and dies.

Neil explains everything to the police, and he is all free. At last, Neil reveals to Ria that he had never poisoned Anahita's drink. It was her fear that killed her.

== Cast ==
- Aftab Shivdasani as Neil Oberoi
- Celina Jaitly as Anahita Saxena
- Amrita Arora as Ria Malhotra
- Sushant Singh as ACP Abhay Rastogi
- Amin Hajee as Rocky

== Soundtrack ==
Red: The Dark Side

Studio album by Himesh Reshammiya
- Released: 9 March 2007 (India)
- Genre: Feature film soundtrack
- Label: T-Series

Himesh Reshammiya chronology
Nehlle Pe Dehlla (2007)	Red: The Dark Side (2007)	Namastey London (2007)

Track No	Songs	Singer(s)	Length
1	"Aafreen Tera Chehra"	Himesh Reshammiya	05:16
2	"Aafreen Tera Chehra (Remix by DJ Akbar Sami)"	Himesh Reshammiya	05:16
3	"Aamin"	Himesh Reshammiya	05:02
4	"Aamin (Remix by DJ Akbar Sami)"	Himesh Reshammiya	05:42
5	"Ek Tumhi"	Jayesh Gandhi	06:10
6	"Ek Tumhi (Remix by DJ Akbar Sami)"	Jayesh Gandhi	05:50
7	"Dil Ne Ye Na Jaana"	Himesh Reshammiya, Harshdeep Kaur	04:28
8	"Loneliness Is Killing"	Himesh Reshammiya, Akriti Kakkar	03:57
9	"Loneliness Is Killing (Remix by DJ Akbar Sami)"	Himesh Reshammiya, Akriti Kakkar	04:53

== Reception ==
IndiaGlitz called film's plot "basic". The film was awarded 1 out of 5 by Taran Adarsh of Bollywood Hungama, who criticized the writing, among other things, calling it "outright tacky".
