= Fool & Final =

2007 Indian film by Ahmed Khan

Fool N Final
- DVD Cover
- Directed by: Ahmed Khan
- Written by: Abbas Hirapurwala; Umesh Shukla
- Based on: Snatch (2000) by Guy Ritchie
- Produced by: Firoz A. Nadiadwala
- Starring: Sunny Deol; Shahid Kapoor; Vivek Oberoi; Sameera Reddy; Ayesha Takia; Sharmila Tagore; Om Puri; Jackie Shroff; Paresh Rawal; Johnny Lever; Arbaaz Khan
- Cinematography: Johny Lal
- Edited by: Ashfaque Makrani
- Music by: Score: Ranjit Barot; Songs: Himesh Reshammiya
- Production company: Base Industries Group
- Distributed by: Shemaroo Entertainment
- Release date: 1 June 2007
- Running time: 160 minutes
- Country: India
- Language: Hindi
- Budget: ₹24 crore
- Box office: ₹27.62 crore

Fool & Final is a 2007 Indian Hindi-language heist comedy film directed by Ahmed Khan and produced by Firoz A. Nadiadwala. The film stars Sunny Deol, Shahid Kapoor, Vivek Oberoi, Sameera Reddy, Ayesha Takia, Sharmila Tagore, Jackie Shroff, Om Puri, Paresh Rawal, Johnny Lever, Chunkey Pandey, Arbaaz Khan and Gulshan Grover. Boxer Mike Tyson makes an appearance in the film's end credits and promos. It is based on the 2000 British film Snatch.

== Plot ==
The story begins with the theft of an extremely valuable diamond in Mumbai by a thief named Rocky. He is meant to hand it over to an accomplice of his London-based uncle, Choksi, in Dubai. However, news of the diamond's arrival attracts local gangster Moscow Chikna, who coerces the debt-ridden junk shop owner Chobey into stealing it for him. Chobey enlists the help of his small-time criminal niece, Tina, and her talented boyfriend, Raja. Raja himself is living a double life, paid to impersonate the deceased nephew of an elderly woman named Lajwanti to spare her trauma. The diamond's trail soon draws the attention of more underworld figures: J.D., a powerful don who runs illegal fight rings, and Gunmaster G9, a detective hired to recover the stone. Chobey's group successfully intercepts Rocky, but in a chaotic turn of events, Moscow Chikna kills Rocky and takes the diamond. However, Chobey's quick-thinking group manages to steal the diamond back during the subsequent commotion, only for it to be accidentally swallowed by Chobey's dog, Hajmola, turning the animal into the most valuable creature in Dubai.

Running parallel to the diamond chase is the story of Munna, a man of integrity who runs a garage and is unaware that his elder brother is involved in a car-stealing ring. Munna crosses paths with Lucky, a gambler desperate to repay his debt to Don J.D. by recruiting fighters for his illegal bouts. Munna is dragged into J.D.'s conflict when the don's men burn down his home in India Colony. To protect his community and save his lover, Payal — a girl on the run from J.D.'s human trafficking operation — Munna reluctantly agrees to fight for the gangster.

In the climactic showdown, all factions converge. Munna wins the boxing match, securing his community's safety and receiving the winnings from Lucky. Meanwhile, Chobey successfully retrieves the diamond from the dog and sells it, gaining immense wealth. He generously gives Lucky and Puttu (the inept pilot who joined their gang) their share. The film has a happy ending: Munna and Payal get married, as do Raja and Tina.

== Cast ==
- Sunny Deol as Munna
- Jackie Shroff as Gunmaster G9
- Arbaaz Khan as Moscow Chikna
- Vivek Oberoi as Lucky
- Shahid Kapoor as Raja / Rahul
- Sameera Reddy as Payal, Munna's girlfriend.
- Ayesha Takia as Tina Chobey, Raja's girlfriend.
- Om Puri as Pratap Singh – Lajwant's husband, Munna's brother.
- Sharmila Tagore as Lajwanti- Pratap's wife, Munna's sister-in-law.
- Paresh Rawal as Chobey, Tina's uncle
- Zakir Hussain as J.D.
- Johnny Lever as Puttu Pilot
- Suresh Menon as Bopal 'Bob' Chaturvedi
- Vijay Raaz as Abdul Dikki
- Razzak Khan as Santa
- Gulshan Grover as Choksi
- Chunkey Pandey as Rocky, Choksi's nephew.
- Asrani as Lalwaani, Choksi's brother.
- Sunil Pal as drunkard at India Colony
- Dev Kantawala as Sunny, Lucky's younger brother.
- Mike Tyson as himself (special appearance)

== Music ==
The music for the film was composed by Himesh Reshammiya. The lyrics were penned by Sameer, Irshad Kamil, Shehzad Roy and Nitin Raikwar.

Fool N Final

Soundtrack album by Himesh Reshammiya
- Released: 2007
- Genre: Feature film soundtrack
- Label: T-Series

Himesh Reshammiya chronology
Good Boy, Bad Boy (2007)	Fool N Final (2007)	Apne (2007)

The soundtrack contains 4 original songs and 3 remixes.

No.	Title	Singer(s)	Length
1.	"Ek Kalsa"	Himesh Reshammiya	5:11
2.	"Ek Kalsa" (Remix)	Himesh Reshammiya	4:05
3.	"Masti" (Remix)	Benny Dayal, MG Sreekumar	4:39
4.	"Sigdi"	Himesh Reshammiya, Jayesh Gandhi	5:07
5.	"Tere Layee"	Kunal Ganjawala, Himani Kapoor, (Rap By: Arya)	4:55
6.	"Tere Layee" (Remix)	Kunal Ganjawala, Kalpana Patowary	4:00
7.	"Yeh Dooriyan (shakira Ve)"	Hanif Shaikh	4:42

== Reception ==
Film critic Taran Adarsh gave the film 1.5 out of 5, writing "'On the whole, FOOL & FINAL is all gloss, no substance. At the box-office, given the hype for the film as also the fantabulous promotion embarked by the magnanimous producer Firoz A. Nadiadwala, the film will attract footfalls in the initial days, but the weak content will tell on the business in the initial weekend itself. Its sustaining power at the ticket window, therefore, is doubtful." Bollywood Hungama wrote: "The director completely utilized the many actors in the movie. Sunny Deol was completly awsome [sic?] as Munna, great performance. Shahid Kapoor was also mesmerizing as a thief". Tanveer Bookwala of Rediff.com gave the film 1 star, writing ″The problem with Fool N Final is that it tries to be a 'wholesome' masala movie—nothing wrong with that, but here, Ahmed Khan and his team of writers (Umesh Shukla and Abbas Hierapurwala) are trying to cater to every audience and throw in every genre of cinema into this mish-mash of half a dozen dudes.″ The Times of India claimed "The first half of the film is a complete washout as it trudges lethargically through a series of misadventures that try to establish the identity of the lead players." Manish Gajjar of BBC.com called the film ″full of gloss and no substance.″
