= Aap Ki Khatir (2006 film) =

- Theatrical release poster
- Directed by: Dharmesh Darshan
- Screenplay by: Sunil Munshi
- Produced by: Ganesh Jain; Ratan Jain; Champak Jain
- Starring: Akshaye Khanna; Suniel Shetty; Priyanka Chopra; Ameesha Patel; Dino Morea; Anupam Kher
- Cinematography: W. B. Rao
- Edited by: Raj Sinha
- Music by: Himesh Reshammiya
- Distributed by: Venus Movies Pvt. Ltd.
- Release date: 25 August 2006
- Running time: 127 minutes
- Country: India
- Language: Hindi
- Budget: ₹16 crore
- Box office: ₹13 crore

Aap Ki Khatir (transl. For your sake) is a 2006 Indian Hindi-language romantic comedy film directed by Dharmesh Darshan, starring Akshaye Khanna and Priyanka Chopra, with Ameesha Patel, Dino Morea, Suniel Shetty, and Anupam Kher. An unofficial remake of the 2005 American film The Wedding Date, it was released on 25 August 2006 and was a box-office bomb as well as Darshan's final film as a director.

== Plot ==
Anu, a London based NRI who is living in India after her boyfriend Danny ditched her at the altar. Now, she has come back to London to be a part of her sister Shirani's marriage to the New York-based, Gujarati businessman Kunal Shah, who is also Danny's best friend.

In a plan to get back to Danny and to make him jealous, Anu convinces her colleague Aman to accompany her to the wedding as her new beau. Incidentally, Shirani was also involved with Danny earlier, which resulted in heartbreak for her, too, as everyone learns of Danny's womanizing ways. Arjun Khanna is the father of Shirani. Betty, Anu's mother, married Arjun after her first husband died when Anu was little.

As time passes by, Aman finds Anu fascinating, and later it develops into a fondness between the two. How Anu and Aman's relationship undergoes a change during the course of these incidents forms the crux of the story.

It turns out that Danny had used Kunal to get to Shirani, and he believes that they can still be together. Shirani keeps trying to tell Danny that she loves Kunal. Anu reacts with Aman in an unfriendly way, but later they form a friendship that, in time, turns into love. When Anu finds out about Danny's relationship with Shirani, she breaks down, knowing that everyone knew (even Aman) but didn't tell her. She tells Aman to go away, but Kunal (who thinks of Aman as a friend) convinces him to stay for his sake (Aap ki khatir). The truth is revealed to everyone, and they believe that Anu loves Aman. Anu's parents convince her to go after Aman, but she is too late as he has already left. When Shirani tells Kunal about Danny, he is heartbroken and chases Danny away. While chasing Danny, he finds Aman going away, and he convinces Aman to ask Anu again for her love. He agrees and makes Kunal realize that he and Shirani are also meant to be together and to marry Shirani. Anu ends up marrying Aman, and Kunal accepts Shirani happily after knowing the truth.

== Cast ==
- Suniel Shetty as Kunal Shah
- Akshaye Khanna as Aman Mehra
- Priyanka Chopra as Anu Khanna
- Ameesha Patel as Shirani Khanna
- Dino Morea as Danny Grover
- Anupam Kher as Arjun Khanna, Shirani's and Anu's father.
- Lillete Dubey as Betty Khanna, Anu and Shirani's mother.
- Tiku Talsania as Praful Shah, Kunal's father.
- Kamini Khanna as Kunal's mother

== Release ==
=== Critical reception ===
Anupama Chopra of India Today titled it as Out of steam and concluded that it is a move from wedding to divorce stories by Bollywood. Taran Adarsh of IndiaFM gave it two stars out of five, describing the film as a mediocre product that has some lively moments, but a weak second half and a climax that throws a wet blanket.

=== Box office ===
According to Box Office India, this movie collected 13.23 crore on a budget of 16 crores during its lifetime.

== Soundtrack ==
Aap Ki Khatir

Soundtrack album by Himesh Reshammiya
- Released: 2006
- Venue: Mumbai
- Genre: Feature film soundtrack
- Label: Venus Records & Tapes
- Producer: Himesh Reshammiya

Himesh Reshammiya chronology
Dil Diya Hai (2006)	Aap Ki Khatir (2006)	Ahista Ahista (2006)

The music is composed by Himesh Reshammiya, and the lyrics are penned by Sameer. The album has sixteen tracks, including seven remixes and two reprise tracks.

=== Track listing ===
No.	Title	Singer(s)	Length
1.	"Aap Ki Khatir"	Himesh Reshammiya	4:56
2.	"Afsana"	Himesh Reshammiya	3:49
3.	"I Love You For What You Are"	Sowmya Raoh, Javed Ali, Parthiv Gohil, Jolly Mukherji, Sukhwinder & Sandeep Chowta	6:16
4.	"Keh Do Naa"	Shaan, Sunidhi Chauhan	5:53
5.	"Meethi Meethi Batan"	Sunidhi Chauhan, Kailash Kher, Jaspinder Narula	6:00
6.	"Tu Hai Kamaal"	Kunal Ganjawala	6:04
7.	"Tu Hi Mera"	Himesh Reshammiya	4:32
8.	"Tu Hi Mera - II"	Himesh Reshammiya	4:36
9.	"Aap Ki Khatir (Remix)"	Himesh Reshammiya	5:04
10.	"Aap Ki Khatir (Unplugged)"	Himesh Reshammiya, Akshaye Khanna	5:59
11.	"Afsana (Remix)"	Himesh Reshammiya	3:28
12.	"I Love You For What You Are (Remix)"	Alisha Chinoy, KK, Kunal Ganjawala	3:50
13.	"Keh Do Naa (Remix)"	Shaan, Sunidhi Chauhan	5:12
14.	"Meethi Meethi Batan (Remix)"	Sunidhi Chauhan, Kailash Kher, Jaspinder Narula	4:17
15.	"Tu Hai Kamaal (Remix)"	Kunal Ganjawala	5:17
16.	"Tu Hi Mera (Remix)"	Himani Kapoor	4:39
