= Nihal Tauro =

Indian playback singer

- Born: 21 February 2000 (age 26); Moodbidri, Karnataka, India
- Genres: Filmi; Indipop
- Occupations: Playback singer; Musician
- Instrument: Vocals
- Years active: 2018–present

Nihal Tauro (born 21 February 2000) is an Indian playback singer who works primarily in Kannada and Hindi films. He gained national recognition as a finalist on the twelfth season of the singing reality television series Indian Idol (2020–2021), where he finished as the fourth runner-up.

== Early life ==
Nihal Tauro was born on 21 February 2000 in Moodbidri, near Mangalore in Karnataka, India, to Herald Tauro and Prisila Tauro. He began recording in studios during his childhood and pursued a Bachelor of Commerce degree.

== Career ==
Tauro began his playback singing career in the Kannada film industry before appearing on national television, recording tracks for films such as Premier Padmini (2019) and Love Mocktail (2020), where he sang "Neene Yendigu" under the composition of Raghu Dixit.

In 2020, Tauro auditioned for the twelfth season of Indian Idol. Despite initially facing a language barrier as a native Kannada and Konkani speaker, he improved his Hindi diction and progressed to the top six finalists, ultimately finishing in fifth place (fourth runner-up) in the August 2021 finale. During the show, composer and judge Himesh Reshammiya offered him his first Hindi playback opportunity.

Following Indian Idol, Tauro expanded his playback work in both Kannada and Hindi cinema. In 2022, he sang "Neenu Bagehariyada Haadu" for the Kannada film Gaalipata 2, composed by Arjun Janya, and "Tere Saath Hoon Main" for the Hindi film Raksha Bandhan, composed by Himesh Reshammiya. In 2026, he performed the title track of the Hindi film Yeh Prem Mol Liya alongside Shreya Ghoshal, composed by Reshammiya and directed by Sooraj Barjatya, and also appeared as a returning contestant on Indian Idol Legends Return.

== Discography ==
=== As playback singer ===
Year	Film	Song	Language	Composer(s)	Ref.
2019	Premier Padmini	"Yaaru Yaaru"	Kannada	Arjun Janya	
2019	Thottil	"Thottil"	Kannada		
2020	Love Mocktail	"Neene Yendigu"	Kannada	Raghu Dixit	
2022	Gaalipata 2	"Neenu Bagehariyada Haadu"	Kannada	Arjun Janya	
2022	Raksha Bandhan	"Tere Saath Hoon Main"	Hindi	Himesh Reshammiya	
2025	Jaan Abhi Baaki Hai		Hindi		
2025	Love OTP		Kannada / Telugu		
2026	Yeh Prem Mol Liya	"Yeh Prem Mol Liya" (Title Track)	Hindi	Himesh Reshammiya	

== Television and reality shows ==
Year	Show	Network	Role	Notes	Ref.
2020–2021	Indian Idol (Season 12)	Sony Entertainment Television	Contestant	Finalist; 4th runner-up	
2026	Indian Idol Legends Return	Sony Entertainment Television / Sony LIV	Returning contestant / Performer	Special/returning appearance	

== Awards and honours ==
- 2021: 17th Kalakar Puraskar, conferred by Carvalho Gharane and Mandd Sobhann in Mangalore for his contributions to music.
