= Amrita Arora =

Indian actress, model, TV presenter, and VJ (born 1981)

Amrita Arora Ladak
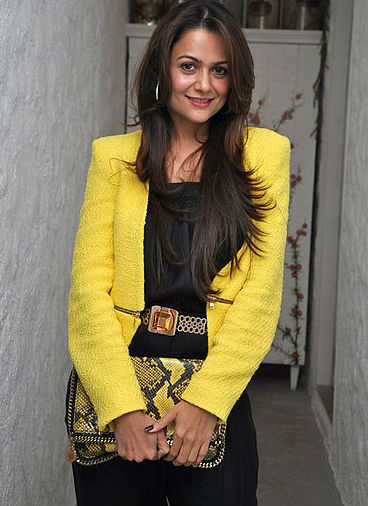
- Arora in 2012
- Born: 31 January 1981 (age 45); Bombay, Maharashtra, India
- Other name: Amrita Arora Ladak
- Occupations: Actress; model; television presenter; VJ
- Years active: 2002–2015
- Spouse: Shakeel Ladak (m. 2009)
- Children: 2
- Relatives: Malaika Arora (sister)

Amrita Arora Ladak (née Arora; born 31 January 1981) is an Indian actress, model, television presenter and video jockey, who primarily appears in Hindi-language films.

== Early and personal life ==
Arora was born in Bombay, Maharashtra to a Punjabi father, Anil Arora, and a Malayali mother, Joyce Polycarp, and was raised as a Roman Catholic. She is the younger sister of Malaika Arora.

She completed her secondary education at Swami Vivekanand School in Chembur.

From the early 2000s to the mid-2000s she was in a relationship with British-Pakistani cricketer Usman Afzaal.

She married Shakeel Ladak, a businessman in the construction industry, in 2009. The ceremonies included a Christian wedding on 4 March 2009, followed by Mehendi on 5 March and a Muslim Nikah ceremony on 6 March 2009. They have two sons.

== Career ==
Arora started her career as a VJ for MTV. She made her Bollywood debut in 2002 opposite Fardeen Khan in the film, Kitne Door Kitne Paas, which was not successful at the box office. Her first successful film was the action comedy, Awara Paagal Deewana. A series of flops followed, among them 2004's Girlfriend about a lesbian relationship, in which she appeared opposite Isha Koppikar.

In 2007, she made a special appearance in Farah Khan's film Om Shanti Om, performing in the song "Deewangi Deewangi" with her sister and former brother-in-law Arbaaz Khan. In the same year, she appeared in Speed and Red: The Dark Side, also starring Aftab Shivdasani and Celina Jaitley.

In 2009, her releases were Deha and Team the Force. The same year, she appeared in a supporting role in Kambakth Ishq, produced by Sajid Nadiadwala.

== Filmography ==
=== Films ===
Year	Title	Role	Notes
2002	Kitne Door Kitne Paas	Karishma Patel	
2002	Awara Paagal Deewana	Mona	
2003	Ek Aur Ek Gyarah	Preeti	
2003	Zameen	Singer/Dancer	Special appearance in song "Dilli Ki Sardi"
2004	Shart: The Challenge	Saryu	
2004	Girlfriend	Sapna	
2004	Mujhse Shaadi Karogi	Roma	Cameo appearance
2004	Rakht	Natasha Bahadur Singh	
2006	Deha	Rini Sinha/Rini M. Desai	
2006	Fight Club - Members Only	Shonali Malhotra	
2007	Red: The Dark Side	Ria Malhotra	
2007	Heyy Babyy	Herself	Special appearance in song "Heyy Babyy"
2007	Speed	Sameera Mehra	Special appearance
2007	Om Shanti Om	Herself	Special appearance in song "Deewangi Deewangi"
2007	Raakh	Nalini	
2007	Godfather	Guest	Pakistani-Urdu film
2008	Rama Rama Kya Hai Dramaaa	Khushi Bhatia	
2008	Hello	Radhika Jha	
2008	Heroes	Priya	Cameo appearance
2008	Golmaal Returns	Esha Santoshi	
2009	Kambakkht Ishq	Kamini Sandu	
2009	Team – The Force	Riya	
2009	Ek Tho Chance	Nishi	
2015	Kuch Toh Hai Tere Mere Darmiyaan	Dhami	

=== Television ===
Year	Title	Role	Notes
2022	Moving in With Malaika	Herself	
