= Himani Kapoor =

Indian singer

- Born: Himani Kapoor; 24 August 1988 (age 37)
- Origin: Faridabad, Haryana, India
- Genres: Music
- Occupation: Singer
- Instrument: Vocals
- Years active: 2005–present

Himani Kapoor is an Indian singer and finalist of Sa Re Ga Ma Pa Challenge 2005. She hosted a show with Karan Oberoi on Zee TV called "Antakshari". She also competed in Star Plus's Jo Jeeta Wohi Superstar. She gained recognition for singing "Thode Kam Ajnabi" in Pagglait composed by Arijit Singh.

== Career ==
Kapoor competed in a music show called Music Ka Maha Muqqabla on Star plus as Mika ki Sherni. She has sung in films like Dil Diya Hai, Aap Ki Khatir, Chingari, Bachna Ae Haseeno, Fool N Final, Oye Lucky! Lucky Oye!, Band Baaja Baaraat and Radhe Shyam.

Himani received an award from the government of Haryana by chief minister Bhupinder Singh Hooda on women's day in year 2008. She released a song dedicated to Indira Gandhi on the occasion of women's day in 2010.

== Discography ==
List of Songs Recorded By Himani Kapoor
Year	Film	Song	Co-singer	Composer
2006	Chingaari	Jab Jab Saiyyan	Solo	Aadesh Shrivastava
2006	Aap Ki Khatir	Tu Hi Mera	Solo	Himesh Reshammiya
2006	Dil Diya Hai	Dil Diya	Himesh Reshammiya	Himesh Reshammiya
2006	Good Boy, Bad Boy	Meri Awargi	Himesh Reshammiya	Himesh Reshammiya
2007	Fool & Final	Tere Layee	Kunal Ganjawala	Himesh Reshammiya
2008	Oye Lucky! Lucky Oye!	Hooriyaan	Brijesh Shandilya	Sneha Khanwalkar
2008	Bachna Ae Haseeno	Jogi Mahi	Shekhar Ravjiani, Sukhwinder Singh	Vishal–Shekhar
2010	Band Baaja Baaraat	Dum Dum	Benny Dayal	Salim–Sulaiman
2010	Benny and Babloo	Jabse Dil Diya Hai	Sukhwinder Singh	Amjad-Nadeem
2019	Motichoor Chaknachoor	Aaj Jaage Rehna	Siddhart Amit Bhavsar	
2021	Pagglait	Thode Kam Ajnabi	Solo	Arijit Singh
2021	Pagglait	Thode Kam Ajnabi (Reprise)	Arijit Singh	Arijit Singh
2021	Toofaan	Star Hai Tu	Siddharth Mahadevan, Divya Kumar	Shankar–Ehsaan–Loy
2022	Me Vasantrao	Tere Dar Se	Rahul Deshpande	
2023	Chhatriwali	Toot Hi Gaya	Durgesh R Rajbhatt	
2023	Satyaprem Ki Katha	Aaj Ke Baad (Reprise)	Manan Bhardwaj	
2023	Dono	Khatt Mitthiyaan	Solo	Shankar-Ehsaan-Loy
2024	Vedaa	TBA		Manan Bhardwaj

List of Singles recorded by Himani Kapoor
Year	Single	Co-singer	Composer
2017	Mehandi	—	Manan Bhardwaj
2018	Naina Di Bandook	—	Manan Bhardwaj
2018	Allah hi Allah	—	Shri Kuldip Singh
2019	Shikayatein	—	Rimi Dhar
2019	Maati	—	Rimi Dhar
2019	Chann Vi Gawah	Madhav Mahajan	Madhav Mahajan
2020	Dagaa	—	Manan Bhardwaj
2020	Tenu Kaddi Na Chhaddaan	—	Shriram Iyer
2021	Tu Hai Dariya	Durgesh Rajbhatt	Durgesh Rajbhatt
2010	Tere Liye	Kailash Kher	Sunil Singh

== Music ==
- Meri Maa / Maa Tu Sach Much Raani Maa - Mothers Day Special - 2016
- Ab Ke Saawan - Monsoon Special - 2016
