= Dil Diya Hai =

2006 Indian film by Aditya Datt

- Theatrical poster
- Directed by: Aditya Datt
- Written by: Aditya Datt
- Produced by: Balabhai Patel
- Starring: Emraan Hashmi; Ashmit Patel; Geeta Basra; Mithun Chakraborty
- Cinematography: Attar Singh Saini
- Edited by: Irfan Shaikh
- Music by: Songs: Himesh Reshammiya; Background Score: Monty Sharma
- Production companies: Shiv Films Production; Practical Productions
- Distributed by: Shree Ashtavinayak Cine Vision
- Release date: 8 September 2006
- Country: India
- Language: Hindi
- Budget: ₹85 million
- Box office: ₹32.5 million

Dil Diya Hai (transl. I Have Given My Heart) is a 2006 Indian Hindi-language romantic thriller film directed by Aditya Datt. It stars Emraan Hashmi, Ashmit Patel, Geeta Basra and Mithun Chakraborty.

== Plot ==
The story is about a girl who is sold into prostitution by the protagonist whom she loves, or so thinks she does, but after she is rescued by the same man who sold her into prostitution, she forgives him and falls in love with him again with no consequences to the protagonist. The justification for joining the prostitution ring is to make money for his moms lung transplant.

== Cast ==
- Emraan Hashmi as Sahil Khanna
- Ashmit Patel as Kunal Malik
- Geeta Basra as Neha Mehra
- Mithun Chakraborty as Rony
- Kitu Gidwani as Michelle
- Ranjeet as Mallik
- Mukul Dev as Police Officer
- Prem Chopra as Head of Security
- Paresh Ganatra as Patel
- Udita Goswami in a special appearance in the song 'Jabse Aankh Ladi'
- Manobala as Neha's Father
- Ananya Sharma as Neha's Mother
- Rashmi Patel as Mrs Khanna (Sahil's mother)
- Gayatri Rawal as Vidya

== Soundtrack ==
Dil Diya Hai

Soundtrack album by Himesh Reshammiya
- Released: 19 July 2006
- Recorded: 2003–05
- Venue: Mumbai
- Genre: Feature film soundtrack
- Label: T-Series
- Producer: Himesh Reshammiya

Himesh Reshammiya chronology
Rocky – The Rebel (2006)	Dil Diya Hai (2006)	Aap Ki Khatir (2006)

The soundtrack features six songs composed by Himesh Reshammiya with lyrics written by Sameer.

- "Afsana": Himesh Reshammiya and Tulsi Kumar
- "Dil Diya": Himesh Reshammiya and Himani Kapoor
- "Yaadaan Teriyaan": Himesh Reshammiya
- "Mile Ho Tum": Himesh Reshammiya and Tulsi Kumar
- "Jabse Aankh Ladi": Jayesh Gandhi and Alisha Chinoy
- "Chalo Dildaar Chalo": Vedala Hemachandra, Vinit Singh, Himani Kapoor, Jayesh Gandhi

The soundtrack also features a remix version of every song. The remixes were rendered by DJ Akbar Sami.

== Release ==
The film was given an A (adults only) certificate by the Central Board of Film Certification after one modification in a dialogue. It was released theatrically on 8 September 2006.
