= Chura Liyaa Hai Tumne =

- DVD cover
- Directed by: Sangeeth Sivan
- Written by: Vibha Singh; Sanjay Masoom (dialogues)
- Screenplay by: Venita Coelho
- Produced by: Vivek Singhania
- Starring: Zayed Khan; Esha Deol; Gulshan Grover; Vijay Raaz; Salil Ankola; Rakhi Sawant
- Cinematography: Ramji
- Edited by: Shirish Kunder
- Music by: Songs: Himesh Reshammiya; Background Score: Dhrubajyoti Phukan
- Production company: PFH Rave Production
- Release date: 21 March 2003
- Running time: 143 minutes
- Language: Hindi
- Budget: ₹75 million
- Box office: ₹51 million

Chura Liyaa Hai Tumne (Captured by You) is a 2003 Indian Hindi-language romantic thriller film, directed by Sangeeth Sivan. The film stars Zayed Khan, in his debut, alongside Esha Deol. Zayed Khan won the Zee Cine Award for Best Male Debut for this film. The film was released on 21 March 2003, and is adapted from the 1963 American film Charade.

== Plot ==
Tina Khanna learns that her uncle Tony, as she fondly used to call him, is dead. But the situation turns out to be worse than expected when CBI and other investigative agencies start pestering her. She learns that her uncle was a conman and a master thief who wanted in connection with a bank heist where RBI lost gold worth Rs. 10 crore to her uncle and his cronies. Tina tries to convince them that she knows nothing about it, but it does not help her in any way.

Meanwhile, she is contacted by Deepak Chopra, an officer in the Embassy of India, Bangkok. He gives her more details about the case. He tells her that other than her uncle, and 3 more people are suspected to be involved in the heist — Om, Chingar, and Sheena, all of whom had met and given her warnings. Deepak tells her that her uncle conned them and stored the money in some secret location. Since she is his only living relative, they think that she knows where the money is. Tina still denies knowing its whereabouts, which Deepak accepts and tells her to contact him anytime she gets a clue.

Tina soon realizes that the trio are stalking her. While trying to know their whereabouts and next plans, she is surprised to bump into Vijay, whom she had met in Goa. Vijay claims that he was trying to find her since she disappeared almost suddenly. She buys Vijay's excuse, as he had been hitting on her since the day they met. Tina explains the situation to him, upon which he safely escorts her to her room. Shortly after meeting her, he meets the trio, signifying that he is in league with them.

In front of Tina, he pretends that he is getting on good terms with the trio, while behind her back, he tries to find evidence. Soon, Chingaar and Sheena are killed. Tina has every piece of evidence pointing towards Vijay. She confronts him, suspicious that he is also the trio's partner. Vijay stuns her by telling her that he is not Vijay but Mahesh Yogi and has infiltrated the gang for his own purpose. Tina, who had started loving him, decides to give him a chance.

Tina meets Deepak and tells him about this. Deepak reveals to her the remaining part of the story — the gang had one more member, Mahesh Yogi. Mahesh got shot in the crossfire between the gang and the police. Instead of helping him, the gang shot him. His bullet-ridden body was recovered from the sea, and his wallet gave the identities of the gang members. Tina confronts Vijay/Mahesh, who tells her that he is, in fact, Prakash Yogi, the younger brother of Mahesh Yogi, who infiltrated the gang under a fake name to get revenge.

But when Deepak tells Tina that Mahesh had no kin, she is unable to trust anyone except Deepak anymore. But Om escapes from the hotel and warns Vijay and Tina simultaneously, as he thinks that one of them is the killer. Tina and Vijay stumble into an antique shop, where she sees coins being sold. She remembers seeing a similar coin in her uncle's possessions. She retrieves his photo, and one shopkeeper immediately remembers selling him a coin for Rs. 10 crore. Tina runs back to her hotel to get the coin, only to be accosted by Om. Before she can do anything, Om falls down, revealing a butcher's knife stabbed in his back. Before dying, he takes the name Mahesh Yogi.

Tina thinks that Vijay is indeed Mahesh Yogi and behind all the murders. She takes the coin and calls Deepak, telling him everything. Deepak tells her to immediately meet him at a certain place along with the coin. Tina is accosted by Vijay/Prakash, who tries to chase her. Tina frantically calls Deepak, but he does not answer. Tina keeps running helter-skelter until she manages to slip off to the rendezvous point.

Here, it is revealed that Deepak Chopra is somebody else. Vijay tries to stop Tina from giving the coin to Deepak, but Deepak drops his act, revealing that he is the real Mahesh Yogi. He also confesses to all the murders, including that of her uncle. Vijay manages to get the coin. In a scuffle between Vijay and Mahesh, the latter falls down the bridge and is killed by a speeding car.

Some days later, Tina goes to CBI to return the coin. She is surprised to see Vijay in that place, who reveals that his real name is Vishal Malhotra, a special officer sent to investigate this case. They both finally confess their love for each other.

== Cast ==
- Zayed Khan as Prakash Yogi / Vijay Chouhan / Vishal Malhotra
- Esha Deol as Tina Khanna
- Gulshan Grover as Om
- Vijay Raaz as Chingar
- Rakhi Sawant as Sheena
- Salil Ankola as Deepak Chopra/Mahesh Yogi
- Parth Dave as Coco
- Sham Kaushal as Tony

== Soundtrack ==
Chura Liyaa Hai Tumne

Soundtrack album by Himesh Reshammiya
- Released: 20 November 2002
- Recorded: 2002
- Venue: Mumbai
- Genre: Feature film soundtrack
- Producer: Himesh Reshammiya

Himesh Reshammiya chronology
Chalo Ishq Ladaaye (2002)	Chura Liyaa Hai Tumne (2002)	Footpath (2003)

All music is composed by Himesh Reshammiya

No.	Title	Lyrics	Singer(s)	Length
1.	"Chura Liyaa Hai Tumne"	Sudhakar Sharma	Alka Yagnik, Shaan	05:04
2.	"Mohabbat Hai Mirchi"	Sanjay Chhel	Shaan, Gayatri Iyer	06:38
3.	"Don't You Love Me"	Sudhakar Sharma	Alka Yagnik, Shaan	05:08
4.	"Boys Are Best"	Jay Verma	Shaan, Sunidhi Chauhan	04:13
5.	"Dil Hai Mera"	Jay Verma	Udit Narayan, Mahalakshmi Iyer	04:23
6.	"Love Theme" (Instrumental)			02:39
7.	"Mohabbat Hai Mirchi (Hot 'N' Spicy Mix)"	Sanjay Chhel	Shaan, Gayatri Iyer	05:19

== Reception ==
Taran Adarsh of IndiaFM gave the film 2 out of 5, writing, "Pantaloon Rave's CHURA LIYAA HAI TUMNE, directed by Sangeeth Sivan, is a thriller with several engrossing moments. But what could've been an ideal popcorn flick, falls prey to mediocrity thanks to its hackneyed screenplay."
