= Good Boy, Bad Boy =

Good Boy Bad Boy
- Theatrical release poster
- Directed by: Ashwini Chaudhary
- Written by: Ashwini Chaudhary
- Produced by: Subhash Ghai; Raju Farooqi
- Starring: Tusshar Kapoor; Emraan Hashmi; Tanushree Dutta; Isha Sharvani; Paresh Rawal
- Cinematography: Manoj Soni
- Edited by: Sanjib Dutta
- Music by: Himesh Reshammiya
- Production company: Mukta Arts
- Distributed by: Ultra Films
- Release date: May 11, 2007
- Running time: 110 minutes
- Country: India
- Language: Hindi

Good Boy Bad Boy is a 2007 Indian Hindi-language comedy drama film directed by Ashwini Chaudhary. The film stars Tusshar Kapoor, Emraan Hashmi, Tanushree Dutta, Isha Sharvani, and Paresh Rawal. It is a remake of the 1992 film Class Act.

== Plot ==
Rajan Malhotra and Raju Malhotra attend the same college but are poles apart in every trait. While Rajan is a brilliant student academically, he is not good in extracurricular activities. Raju on the other hand is poor in studies but good in extracurricular activities. The college they attend gets a new and strict principal Diwan Awasthi, whose mission is to transform this ill-reputed college into a flocked one. Hence he divides the students according to their merit. So while Raju is fit for the C-section, for his poor academic performance, Rajan easily gets access to the A-section with his 90% marks. Raju however falls for a girl in A-section and hence decides to swap his place with a hesitant Rajan who enters the C-section for the first time in his life. Mr. Awasthi learns of this and retaliates by sending their names to a quiz and dance competition. So now, geeky Rajan will have to dance while athletic Raju will have to answer questions hurled at him.

== Cast ==
- Tusshar Kapoor as Rajan Malhotra
- Emraan Hashmi as Rajveer "Raju" Malhotra
- Tanushree Dutta as Dinky Kapur
- Isha Sharvani as Rashmi Awasthi
- Paresh Rawal as Principal Diwanchand "Diwan" Awasthi
- Manu Malik as Raj Basra
- Rakesh Bedi as Mr. Prem Malhotra
- Navni Parihar as Mrs. Prem Malhotra
- Anang Desai as Mr. P.K. Malhotra
- Prabha Sinha as Mrs. P.K. Malhotra
- Kabir Sadanand as Willyboy
- Sushmita Mukherjee as Prof. Bebo Chatterjee
- Jennifer Mayani as Jenny
- Ambika Chaudhary as Deepti Talpade
- Rajesh Balwani as Philosophy teacher
- Naseer Abdullah as Psychology teacher
- Amita Chandekar as Prof. Julie
- Ghanshyam Garg as Fakira

== Soundtrack ==
Good Boy, Bad Boy

Soundtrack album by Himesh Reshammiya
- Released: 2007
- Recorded: 2007
- Genre: Feature film soundtrack
- Language: Hindi
- Label: Tips Music
- Director: Himesh Reshammiya
- Producer: Himesh Reshammiya

Himesh Reshammiya chronology
Shakalaka Boom Boom (2007)	Good Boy, Bad Boy (2007)	Fool N Final (2007)

All music was composed by Himesh Reshammiya. The lyrics were penned by Sameer.

#	Title	Singer(s)
1	"Meri Awaargi"	Himesh Reshammiya, Himani Kapoor
2	"Good Boy Bad Boy"	Himesh Reshammiya, Akriti Kakkar
3	"Ashiqana Aalam"	Himesh Reshammiya, Alka Yagnik, Sunidhi Chauhan, Vineet Singh
4	"Dard-E-Dil"	Zubeen Garg
5	"Good Boy Bad Boy (Remix)"	Himesh Reshammiya, Akriti Kakkar
6	"Meri Awargi (Remix)"	Himesh Reshammiya, Himani Kapoor
7	"Aashiqana Aalam (Remix)"	Himesh Reshammiya, Sunidhi Chauhan,
8	"Dard-E-Dil (Remix)"	Himesh Reshammiya
