= Aditya Datt =

Indian filmmaker

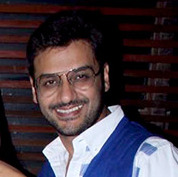
- Datt in 2019
- Occupations: Film director; screenwriter
- Years active: 2005–present
- Relatives: Anand Bakshi (grandfather)

Aditya Datt is an Indian film director and screenwriter known for his work in Hindi films.

== Personal life ==
Datt is the grandson of lyricist Anand Bakshi.

== Filmography ==
=== Film ===
Year	Name	Notes
2005	Aashiq Banaya Aapne	
2006	Dil Diya Hai	
2008	Good Luck!	
2012	Will you Marry Me?	
2013	Table No. 21	
2019	Commando 3	
2024	Crakk	
2026	Gunmaaster G9 †	

=== Web series ===
- Karenjit Kaur – The Untold Story of Sunny Leone (2018)
- Bad Cop (2024)
