= Salman Ali =

Indian playback singer

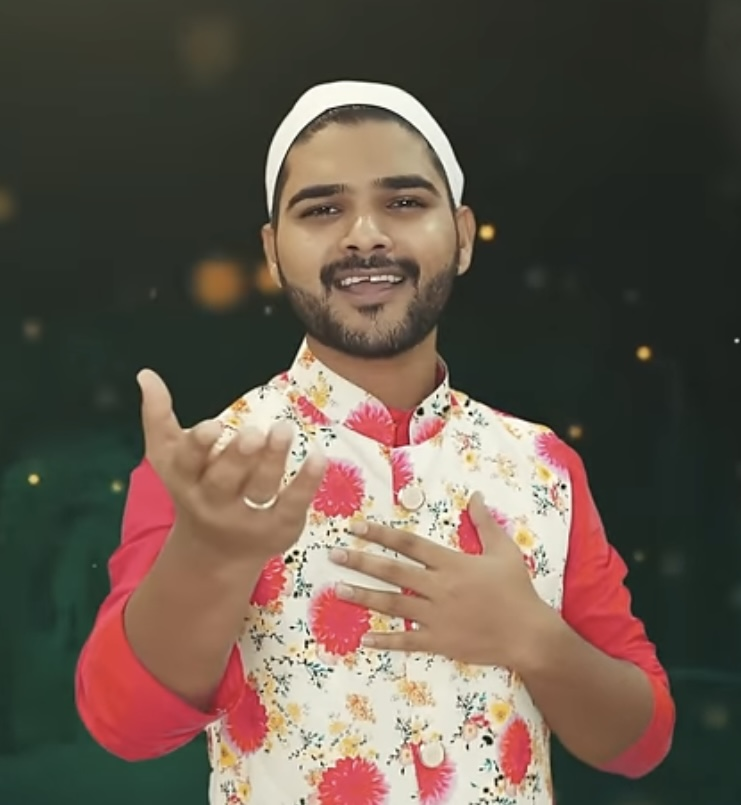
- Salman Ali in 2023

Background information
- Born: Punhana, Haryana, India
- Origin: Mewat
- Genres: Sufi; rock; pop
- Occupation: Playback singer
- Instruments: Vocals; keyboard
- Years active: 2011–present

Salman Ali is an Indian singer who won the 10th season of Indian Idol. He was the first runner-up in the 2011 Sa Re Ga Ma Pa L'il Champs. In 2019, he made his debut as a playback singer with the song Jai He from the film Satellite Shankar. In 2019, he also sang the song Awara for the film Dabangg 3. Salman sang the theme song for the Indian television series Chandragupta Maurya, which airs on Sony TV.

== Background ==
Salman Ali was born in Punhana, located in the Nuh district of Haryana. Salman's family has made a living off singing for the past four generations.

== Television ==
Year	Show	Role	Channel	Note
2011	Sa Re Ga Ma Pa Li'l Champs 2011	Contestant	Zee TV	Runner-up
2018	Indian Idol - Season 10	Contestant	Sony TV	Winner
2019	Superstar Singer - Season 1	Captain	Sony TV	
2021	Indian Pro Music League	Team member (UP Dabbang	Zee TV	Eliminate
2022	Superstar Singer - Season 2	Captain	Sony TV	
2024	Superstar Singer - Season 3	Captain	Sony TV	
2026	Indian Idol Legends Return	Contestant	Sony TV	

== Discography ==
=== Film songs ===
Year	Film	Song	Composer(s)	Lyricist	Notes
2018	Sui Dhaaga	Sab Badhiya Hai	Anu Malik	Varun Grover, Piyush Mittal	Background singer
2019	Satellite Shankar	Jai He	Sandeep Shirodkar	Manoj Muntashir	
2019	Dabangg 3	Awara	Sajid–Wajid	Sajid, Sameer Anjaan	
2019	Dabangg 3	Habibi Ke Nain	Sajid–Wajid	Irfan Kamal	Background singer
2020	Happy Hardy and Heer	Teri Meri Kahani remix	Himesh Reshammiya, DJ Akbar Sami	Shabbir Ahmed	Alaaps
2020	Sayonee	Naina Lahoo	Joy-Anjan	Yash Eshwari	
2022	Middle Class Love	Manjha	Himesh Reshammiya	Shakeel Azmi	Alaaps
2024	Luv Ki Arrange Marriage	Ishq Ka Chav	Prini Siddhant Madhav	Arafat Mehmood	Zee5 film
2025	Badass Ravi Kumar	Aafaton Ke Daur Mein	Himesh Reshammiya	Shabbir Ahmed	
2025	Badass Ravi Kumar	Medley	Himesh Reshammiya	Himesh Reshammiya, Shabbir Ahmed, Sameer Anjaan	

=== Non-film songs ===
Year	Album	Song	Composer(s)	Lyricist	Notes
2021	Moods with Melodies	Pyarr Tumse	Himesh Reshammiya	Himesh Reshammiya	
2021	Moods with Melodies	Jhoom Baraabar Jhoom	Himesh Reshammiya	Himesh Reshammiya	
2021	Himesh Ke Dil Se	Aashiquii Ka Gum	Himesh Reshammiya	Himesh Reshammiya	
2021	Singles	Mohabbat Ke Kabil	Shiva Chopra	Ravi Chopra	
2022	Himesh Ke Dil Se	Bas Tum Mere Paas Raho	Himesh Reshammiya	Sonia Kapoor	
2023	Himesh Ke Dil Se	Tera Aana	Himesh Reshammiya	Himesh Reshammiya	
2023	Himesh Ke Dil Se	Teraa Meraa Rishta	Himesh Reshammiya	Himesh Reshammiya	
2023	Himesh Ke Dil Se	Saanson Meinn	Himesh Reshammiya	Himesh Reshammiya	
2023	Himesh Ke Dil Se	Poocho Mere Dil Se	Himesh Reshammiya	Himesh Reshammiya	
2024	Himesh Ke Dil Se	Lamha Mera	Himesh Reshammiya	Himesh Reshammiya	
