= Bad Boy (2023 film) =

- Theatrical release poster
- Directed by: Rajkumar Santoshi
- Written by: Sanjeev; Ranjit Kapoor
- Based on: Cinema Choopistha Mava (Telugu)
- Produced by: Anjum Qureshi; Sajid Qureshi
- Starring: Namashi Chakraborty; Amrin Qureshi; Darshan Jariwala; Johny Lever
- Cinematography: Tanveer Mir
- Edited by: Steven H. Bernard
- Music by: Songs: Himesh Reshammiya; Score: Raju Singh
- Production company: Inbox Pictures
- Release date: 28 April 2023
- Country: India
- Language: Hindi

Bad Boy is a 2023 Indian Hindi-language romantic comedy film directed by Rajkumar Santoshi produced by Anjum Qureshi and Sajid Qureshi. The film stars newcomers Namashi Chakraborty and Amrin Qureshi. It is a remake of 2015 Telugu film Cinema Choopistha Mava.

== Plot ==
Raghu, a so-called "bad boy", falls in love with a student named Rituparna whose father is very strict and opposed to their relationship.To win Rituparna's heart Raghu tries to prove his worth to her father.

== Cast ==
- Namashi Chakraborty as Raghu
- Amrin Qureshi as Rituparna "Ritu" Bannerjee
- Darshan Jariwala as Dr. Ketan Patel
- Johnny Lever as Poltu
- Saswata Chatterjee as Shubhankar Bannerjee
- Rajesh Sharma as Shambhunath, Raghu's father
- Rajpal Yadav as a bus driver
- Rajiv Kumar Aneja as a professor
- Mithun Chakraborty, who made a special appearance in the song "Janabe Ali"

== Soundtrack ==
Bad Boy

Soundtrack album by Himesh Reshammiya
- Released: 26 April 2023
- Recorded: 2022
- Venue: Mumbai
- Genre: Feature film soundtrack
- Length: 26:54
- Language: Hindi
- Label: Zee Music Company

Himesh Reshammiya chronology
Kisi Ka Bhai Kisi Ki Jaan (2023)	Bad Boy (2023)	Badass Ravi Kumar (2025)

Official audio
- Bad Boy - Full Album on YouTube

Singles from Bad Boy
- 1. "Tera Hua" Released: 26 February 2023; 2. "Aalam Na Poocho" Released: 20 March 2023; 3. "Janabe Ali" Released: 29 March 2023; 4. "Instaa Vich Story" Released: 19 April 2023; 5. "Saajnaa" Released: 8 May 2023

The background score was composed by Raju Singh and lyrics were penned by Himesh Reshammiya, Sonia Kapoor, Kumaar and Shabbir Ahmed.

Track listing
No.	Title	Lyrics	Singer(s)	Length
1.	"Tera Hua"	Sonia Kapoor	Arijit Singh, Jyotica Tangri	4:40
2.	"Janabe Ali"	Himesh Reshammiya	Himesh Reshammiya	4:03
3.	"Instaa Vich Story"	Kumaar	Himesh Reshammiya, Vineet Singh, Aditi Singh Sharma, Asees Kaur	4:29
4.	"Aalam Na Poocho"	Shabbir Ahmed	Payal Dev, Raj Barman, Aakritti Mehra	4:47
5.	"Saajnaa"	Shabbir Ahmed	Asees Kaur	3:36
6.	"Saajnaa (Reprise)"	Shabbir Ahmed	Shaan	5:24
Total length:				33:19

== Release and reception ==
The film was released on 28 April 2023, and it was unsuccessful at the box office. A critic from Rediff.com wrote: "The director, who began his career with great films like Ghayal, Damini and Ghatak, has made romantic comedies too, including the cult-ish Andaz Apna Apna, but a movie like Bad Boy being made in 2023 would have been just as unwatchable no matter who made it".
