= Sunny Hindustani =

Indian singer

- Born: Amarpura, Bhatinda, India
- Genres: Sufi; Rock
- Occupation: Singer
- Instrument: Vocals
- Years active: 2020-present
- Labels: T-Series

Sunny Hindustani is an Indian singer and the winner of Indian Idol 11.

== Early life and career ==
Sunny was born in Bhatinda, Punjab, He was fond of music since his childhood and after dropping out of school, he started performing at various functions and events in his locality. He lost his father at the age of 13, and hence, to earn a livelihood he had to shine shoes.

He appeared in the audition of Indian Idol Season 11 and got selected for the main show. Subsequently, in the final, getting the most audience votes, he became the winner of Season 11. During the show, he received a few offers from other music composers to playback for them in their upcoming films.

In 2019, he made his debut as a playback singer with the song "Rom Rom" for the film The Body. Veteran singer Amit Kumar also signed him for a song.

== Discography ==
Year	Film	Song	Composer	Ref
2019	The Body	Rom Rom	Shamir Tandon	
2020	Panga	Jugnu	Shankar–Ehsaan–Loy	
2020	Bad Boy	Tere Nazar	Himesh Reshammiya	
2023	Himesh Ke Dil Se	Tuu Meraa Naginaa	Himesh Reshammiya	
2023	Himesh Ke Dil Se	Rabba	Himesh Reshammiya	
