= Ranu Mondal =

- Born: Krishnanagar, Nadia, West Bengal, India
- Occupation: Playback singer
- Instrument: Vocals
- Years active: 2019–present
- Spouse: Bablu Mondal (m. 1979; died 1986)

Ranu Maria Mondal is an Indian playback singer. She is best known for singing "Teri Meri Kahani" with Himesh Reshammiya. The song was used in the Hindi musical film Happy Hardy and Heer (2020).

== Career and achievements ==
A viral video showed a woman singing at a railway station. She was later identified as, Ranu Mondal, a poor woman from West Bengal. She became known as the “station singer” after the video spread widely on social media. The video brought public attention to her life and talent, highlighting her situation and background in a simple and factual manner.

Following an invitation from Himesh, she traveled to Mumbai. At the time, Himesh was a judge on the singing reality show Indian Idol 11. Her appearance on the show provided her first experience with the entertainment industry's spotlight. She subsequently collaborated with Himesh on several recordings, including songs for the films Happy Hardy And Heer ("Teri Meri Kahani"), "Aashiqui Mein Teri 2.0", and "Aadat", among others. She also partnered with Bangladeshi artist Hero Alom.

Ranu Mondal's fame rapidly faded after her viral rise. She returned to Ranaghat, now living in a dilapidated home with trash-filled rooms. Dependent on neighbours for food and bills due to deteriorating mental health, she survives on donations.

== Controversy ==
In November 2019, Mondal was seen behaving rudely with a fan who wanted to take a selfie with her. In the viral video, a woman seemed very interested in taking a selfie during an event. Mondal arrogantly taped the woman’s shoulder in return, asking her "Kya Hai Yeh?" (What is this?).

== Discography ==
List of songs recorded
Year	Film	Song	Composer	Lyricist	Co-singer	Language
2019	Single	"Ek Pyaar Ka Naghma Hai"	Laxmikant–Pyarelal	Santosh Anand	Solo	Hindi
2020	Happy Hardy and Heer	"Teri Meri Kahani"	Himesh Reshammiya	Shabbir Ahamed	Himesh Reshammiya	Hindi
2020	Happy Hardy and Heer	"Teri Meri Kahani" (remix)	Himesh Reshammiya	Shabbir Ahamed	Himesh Reshammiya	Hindi
2020	Happy Hardy and Heer	"Keh Rahi Hai Naazdeekiyaan"	Himesh Reshammiya	Shabbir Ahamed	Himesh Reshammiya, Udit Narayan, Ranu Mondal, Payal Dev, Sameer Khan	Hindi
2020	Happy Hardy and Heer	"Aashiqui Mein Teri 2.0"	Himesh Reshammiya	Sameer, Himesh Reshammiya	Himesh Reshammiya	Hindi
2020	Happy Hardy and Heer	"Aadat"	Himesh Reshammiya	Sonia Kapoor	Himesh Reshammiya, Asees Kaur, Rabbi Shergill	Hindi
2022	Single	"Tumi Chhara Ami"	–	–	Hero Alom	Bengali
