= Moods with Melodies =

Studio album by Himesh Reshammiya
- Released: 2021
- Recorded: 2021, 2022, 2023, 2024
- Venue: Mumbai
- Studio: HR Musik Limited
- Label: Himesh Reshammiya Melodies
- Producer: Himesh Reshammiya

Himesh Reshammiya chronology
| Surroor 2021 (2021) | Moods with Melodies (2021) | Himesh Ke Dil Se (2021) |

Singles from Moods with Melodies
- 1. "Tere Bagairr" Released: 23 June 2021; 2. "Pyarr Tumse" Released: 27 August 2021; 3. "Iss Pyaar Ko" Released: 9 October 2021; 4. "Tu" Released: 18 October 2021; 5. "Jhoom Baraabar Jhoom" Released: 7 December 2021; 6. "Yeh Dil Merra Maane Kahaan" Released: 16 December 2021; 7. "Iss Pyarr Ko (Reprise)" Released: 22 December 2021; 8. "Duaa Hai" Released: 13 January 2022; 9. "Dekhaa Tujhe Toh Lagaa" Released: 4 February 2022; 10. "Meri Aashhiqui" Released: 14 March 2022; 11. "Designer Lehenga" Released: 24 March 2022; 12. "Tu Kisi Aurr Ko Na Chaheinn" Released: 14 April 2022; 13. "O Ranjhana" Released: 28 April 2022; 14. "Duaa Hai (Reprise)" Released: 11 June 2022; 15. "Juda Tu Na Hona" Released: 28 October 2022; 16. "Tu Rab Di Meherr" Released: 15 November 2022; 17. "My boyfriend" Released: 18 November 2022; 18. "Teri Aankhein" Released: 23 December 2022; 19. "Meraa Aks" Released: 6 January 2023; 20. "Chaand Raaton Meiin" Released: 11 January 2023; 21. "Saara Zamaana" Released: 17 January 2023; 22. "Saiyyoni" Released: 20 January 2023; 23. "Guldasta" Released: 1 February 2023; 24. "Terra Merra Sillsilaa" Released: 2 February 2023; 25. "Tere Naam Se Mera Dil" Released: 3 February 2023; 26. "Tum Ho Nazmm HamHari" Released: 7 February 2023; 27. "Ae Merii Wafaa" Released: 8 February 2023; 28. "Tera Saath Nibhaungi" Released: 10 February 2023; 29. "Pyaar Karta Hai Dil" Released: 11 February 2023; 30. "Mere Ban Jaoo" Released: 15 February 2023; 31. "Tere Bin Zindagi" Released: 17 February 2023; 32. "Tum Ho Soulmate Mere" Released: 27 April 2023; 33. "Nashaa" Released: 8 May 2023; 34. "Ye Raat Hai Kitni Hassen" Released: 24 August 2023; 35. "Saiyyonni (Lofi Mix)" Released: 25 August 2023; 36. "Tere Ho Gaye" Released: 31 August 2023; 37. "Mere Bekhudi" Released: 10 October 2023; 38. "Teri Panaahon Mein" Released: 10 November 2023; 39. "Meri Sannson Mein" Released: 21 November 2023; 40. "Tu Pyaar Hai Mera" Released: 27 November 2023; 41. "Har Lamha" Released: 28 November 2023; 42. "Tere Siva Koi" Released: 5 December 2023; 43. "Faaslon Ki Dhun" Released: 12 January 2024; 44. "Love You So Much Baby" Released: 23 January 2024; 45. "Tujhse Milne Ke Baad" Released: 29 January 2024; 46. "Rab Ki Saugaat" Released: 31 January 2024

Moods with Melodies is the fourth studio album by Himesh Reshammiya, produced by Reshammiya under the banner Himesh Reshammiya Melodies. It is the second album by Reshammiya in 2021 after Surroor 2021. Reshammiya announced the album on World Music Day, followed by the release of the first song on 23 June 2021.

== Volume I ==
First song of the volume "Tere Bagairr", sung by Indian Idol 12 winner singer Pawandeep Rajan and first runner-up Arunita Kanjilal, was released on 23 June 2021. The song was praised by critics. Later a studio version was also released.

The second song "Pyaar Tumse", released on 27 August, was sung by Indian Idol 10 winner Salman Ali.

The third song, "Iss Pyar Ko", sung by Dev Negi, was released on 9 October 2021, later a reprised version sung by Negi was also released.

The song "Duaa Hai", a heart-breaking sad song, sung by Vineet Singh, featured Big Boss Season 15, winner TV actress Tejasswi Prakash.

The song "Designer Lehnga", a bridal anthem, was sung by Romaninan singer Iulia Vantur, her second song with Reshammiya.

== Track listing ==
The first song of the album "Tere Bagairr" was sung by Pawandeep Rajan and Arunita Kanjilal, the music video featured Ishitha Chauhan and Parth.

All songs were composed by Himesh Reshammiya, while lyrics were penned by Reshammiya, Sameer, Shabbir Ahmed, Sonia Kapoor and Manish S. Shukla.

=== Original ===
| No. | Title | Lyrics | Singer(s) | Length |
|---|---|---|---|---|
| 1. | "Tere Bagairr" | Sameer | Pawandeep Rajan, Arunita Kanjilal | 5:23 |
| 2. | "Pyarr Tumse" | Himesh Reshammiya | Salman Ali | 4:26 |
| 3. | "Iss Pyar Ko" | Himesh Reshammiya | Dev Negi | 5:24 |
| 4. | "Tu" | Himesh Reshammiya | Pawandeep Rajan | 3:36 |
| 5. | "Jhoom Baraabar Jhoom" | Sameer | Salman Ali | 4:21 |
| 6. | "Yeh Dil Merra Kahaan" | Himesh Reshammiya | Palak Muchhal, Sawai Bhatt | 2:47 |
| 7. | "Iss Pyar Ko (Reprise)" | Himesh Reshammiya | Dev Negi | 4:55 |
| 8. | "Duaa Hai" | Himesh Reshammiya | Vineet Singh | 4:15 |
| 9. | "Dekhaa Tujhe Toh Lagaa" | Himesh Reshammiya | Pawandeep Rajan, Arunita Kanjilal | 4:34 |
| 10. | "Merii Aashhiqui" | Himesh Reshaammiya | Ananya Chakroborty, Sanjana Bhatt | 3:38 |
| 11. | "Designer Lehenga" | Shabbir Ahmed | Iulia Vântur | 4:31 |
| 12. | "Tu Kisi Aurr Ko Na Chaheinn" | Himesh Reshammiya | Arunita Kanjilal, Nihal Tauro | 4:15 |
| 13. | "O Ranjhana" | Shabbir Ahmed | Amrita Kak | 4:55 |
| 14. | "Duaa Hai Reprise" | Himesh Reshammiya | Vineet Singh | 3:46 |
| 15. | "Juda Tu Na Hona" | Himesh Reshammiya | Mohammad Faiz | 3:18 |
| 16. | "Tu Rab Di Meherr" | Himesh Reshammiya | Rupali Jagga | 3:15 |
| 17. | "My boyfriend" | Himesh Reshammiya | Shannon K | 2:45 |
| 18. | "Teri Aankhein" | Himesh Reshammiya | Kavya Limaye | 3:12 |
| 19. | "Meraa Aks" | Himesh Reshammiya | Chetanya Vaish | 4:10 |
| 20. | "Chaand Raaton Meiin" | Himesh Reshammiya | Raj Barman | 3:36 |
| 21. | "Saara Zamaana" | Himesh Reshammiya | Khussh | 3:58 |
| 22. | "Saiyyonni" | Himesh Reshammiya | Javed Ali | 4:27 |
| 23. | "Guldasta" | Sonia Kapoor | Kavya Limaye | 3:58 |
| 24. | "Terra Merra Sillsilaa" | Himesh Reshammiya | Nachiket Lele | 4:20 |
| 25. | "Tere Naam Se Mera Dil" | Manish S. Shukla | Samyak Prasana | 4:08 |
| 26. | "Tum Ho Nazmm Ho Hamaarii" | Himesh Reshammiya | Abhijeet Sawant | 2:56 |
| 27. | "Ae Merii Wafaa" | Himesh Reshammiya | Rohit Raut | 3:58 |
| 28. | "Tera Saath Nibhaungi" | Himesh Reshammiya | Heeral Chhatralia | 4:29 |
| 29. | "Pyaar Karta Hai Dil" | Himesh Reshammiya | Adriz Ghosh | 4:22 |
| 30. | "Mere Ban Jaoo" | Himesh Reshammiya | Vraj Kshatriya | 3:36 |
| 31. | "Tere Bin Zindagi" | Himesh Reshammiya | Maanuni | 4:11 |
| 32. | "Tumm Ho Soulmate Mere" | Himesh Reshammiya | Nishtha Sharma | 2:53 |
| 33. | "Nashaa" | Himesh Reshammiya | Mohammad Faiz | 3:57 |
| 34. | "Ye Raat Hai Kitni Haseen" | Himesh Reshammiya | Sanchari Sengupta | 4:27 |
| 35. | "Saiyyonni (Lofi Mix)" | Himesh Reshammiya | Javed Ali | 5:28 |
| 36. | "Tere Ho Gaye" | Himesh Reshammiya | Nishtha Sharma | 4:42 |
| 37. | "Meri Bekhudi" | Himesh Reshammiya | Sana Arora | 4:30 |
| 38. | "Teri Panaahon Mein" | Himesh Reshammiya | Vejayalakshmi Puli | 4:10 |
| 39. | "Meri Sannson Mein" | Himesh Reshammiya | Bullet B-One | 4:38 |
| 40. | "Tu Pyaar Hai Mera" | Himesh Reshammiya | Rik Basu | 4:34 |
| 41. | "Har Lamha" | Himesh Reshammiya | Bullet B-One | 4:43 |
| 42. | "Tere Siva Koi" | Himesh Reshammiya | Nihal Tauro | 4:47 |
| 43. | "Faaslon Ki Dhun" | Himesh Reshammiya | Sneha Bhattacharya | 4:10 |
| 44. | "Love You So Much Baby" | Himesh Reshammiya | Khussh | 4:19 |
| 45. | "Tujhse Milne Ke Baad" | Himesh Reshammiya | Nishtha Sharma | 4:11 |
| 46. | "Rab Ki Sangaat" | Himesh Reshammiya | Sneha Bhattcharya | 4:11 |

== Music videos ==
=== Volume I ===
| Song | Moods | Director | Featuring | Notes |
|---|---|---|---|---|
| "Tere Bagairr" | Deewana | Shawn N Arranha | Parth, Ishita Chauhan | |
| "Pyarr Tumse" | Aashiqana | Shawn N Arranha | Parth, Ishita Chauhan, Salman Ali (also features Tiger Pop, Arya Singh) | |
| "Iss Pyar Ko" | Deewana | Sidhaant Sachdev | Sonakshi Singh Rawat, Parth & Navneet Malik | |
| "Tu" | Mastaana | Sidhaant Sachdev | Avni Bhatia and Tushar Chhibber | |
| "Jhoom Baraabar Jhoomm" | Sharaabi | – | Salman Ali | Studio version |
| "Yeh Dil Mera Maane Kahaan" | Aashiqana | Shawn N Arranha | Parth, Sanaya Pithawalla | |
| "Duaa Hai" | Parwaana | Shawn N Arranha | Tejasswi Prakash, Vineet Singh | |
| "Dekhaa Tujhe Toh Lagaa" | Geet Ghazalish | – | Pawandeep Rajan, Arunita Kanjilal | Studio version |
| "Merii Aashhiqui" | Geet Ghazalish | – | Ananya Chakraborty, Sanjana Bhatt | Studio version |
| "Designer Lehenga" | Wedding Blues | Haider Khan | Iulia Vântur | Studio version |
| "Tu Kisi Aurr Ko Na Chaheinn" | Parwaana | Sidhaant Sachdev | Sonakshi Singh Rawat, Parth & Navneet Malik | |
| "O Ranjhana" | Aashiqaana | Haider Khan | Amrita Kak | Studio version |
| "Dua Hai (Reprise)" | Parwaana | – | Vineet Singh | Studio version |
| "Juda Tu Na Hona" | Deewana | – | Mohammad Faiz | Studio version |
| "Tu Rab Di Meherr" | Deewana | – | Rupali Jagga | Studio version |
| "My boyfriend" | Deewana | – | Shannon K | Studio version |
| "Teri Aankhein" | Deewana | – | Kavya Limaye | Studio version |
| "Meraa Aks" | Deewana | – | Chetanya Vaish | Studio version |
| "Chaand Raaton Meiin" | Deewana | – | Raj Barman | Studio version |
| "Saara Zamaana" | The Birthday Song | – | Khussh | Studio version |
| "Saiyyonni" | Deewana | – | Javed Ali | Studio version |
| "Guldasta" | Deewana | – | Kavya Limaye | Studio version |
| "Terra Merra Sillsilla" | Deewana | – | Nachiket Lele | Studio version |
| "Tere Naam Se Mera Dil" | Deewana | – | Samyak Prasana | Studio version |
| "Tum Ho Nazmm Hamaari" | Deewana | – | Abhijeet Sawant | Studio version |
| "Ae Merii Wafaa" | Deewana | – | Rohit Raut | Studio version |
| "Tera Saath Nibhaungi" | Deewana | – | Heeral Chhatralia | Studio version |
| "Pyaar Karta Hai Dil" | Deewana | – | Adriz Ghosh | Studio version |
| "Mere Ban Jaoo" | Deewana | – | Vraj Kshatriya | Studio version |
| "Tere Bin Zindagi" | Deewana | – | Maanuni | Studio version |
| "Tumm Ho Soulmate Mere" | Deewana | – | Nishtha Sharma | Studio version |
| "Nashaa" | Deewana | Sahil Baghra; Jerry Batra | Mohammad Faiz, Ruhana Khanna | |
| "Ye Raat Hai Kitni Haseen" | Deewana | – | Sanchari Sengupta | Studio version |
| "Saiyyonni (Lofi Mix)" | Deewana | – | Javed Ali | Studio version |
| "Tere Ho Gaye" | Deewana | – | Nishtha Sharma | Studio version |
| "Meri Bekhudi" | Deewana | – | Sana Arora | Studio version |
| "Teri Panaahon Mein" | Deewana | – | Vejayalakshmi Puli | Studio version |
| "Meri Saanson Mein" | Deewana | – | Bullet B-One | Studio version |
| "Tu Pyaar Mera" | Deewana | – | Rik Basu | Studio version |
| "Har Lamha" | Deewana | – | Bullet B-One | Studio version |
| "Tere Siva Koi" | Deewana | – | Nihal Tauro | Studio version |
| "Faaslon Ki Dhun" | Deewana | – | Sneha Bhattacharya | Studio version |
| "Love You So Much Baby" | Valentine's Day | – | Khussh | Studio version |
| "Tujhse Milne Ke Baad" | Deewana | – | Nishtha Sharma | Studio version |
| "Rab Ki Sangaat" | Deewana | – | Sneha Bhattacharya | Studio version |
