= Teri Meri Kahani (song) =

- Cover art of the song

Song by Himesh Reshammiya and Ranu Mondal

from the album Happy Hardy and Heer
- Released: 11 September 2019
- Studio: HR Musik, Mumbai
- Genre: Film soundtrack
- Length: 4:55
- Label: Tips Music
- Songwriters: Himesh Reshammiya (music); Shabbir Ahmed (lyrics)

Music video
- "Teri Meri Kahani" on YouTube

"Teri Meri Kahani" (transl. Story of Yours and Mine) is a Hindi song from the film Happy Hardy and Heer directed by Raka, starring Himesh Reshammiya and Sonia Mann. The song was sung by Reshammiya and Ranu Mondal. The song was composed by Reshammiya, while its lyrics were penned by Shabbir Ahmed. The song was released on 11 September 2019.

== Background ==
Ranu Mondal, a busker at Ranaghat Junction railway station in West Bengal, was noticed by a passenger Atanu Chakraborty who shot a video of her covering Lata Mangeshkar's "Ek Pyaar Ka Nagma" and posted it on social media. Within days, it went viral, being viewed more than 2.5 million times across various social platform and she was appreciated for her voice. Soon after being viral she was invited to music reality show Superstar Singer, where Reshammiya, one of the judges of the show, was impressed by her voice and offered her a song for the film Happy Hardy and Heer.

== Music video ==
The music video featured Himesh Reshammiya and Sonia Mann from the film and Ranu Mondal while singing at HR Musik Studio. The video starts with Reshammiya, telling the lines "Taj Mahal ki rakhwali karte karte chowkidar ko yeh lagne lag jatahe ki Taj Mahal uski property hain, magar papers toh Shah Jahan ke hi naam hain na."(literally, After working as a guard for Taj Mahal for days, the guardman imagines it to be his own property, but actually Shah Jahan is already credited for it.)

== Release ==
On 22 August 2019, Reshammiya posted a short video of recording the song with Mondal on his Instagram account which was viewed more than 4 lakh (400,000) times within an hour and earned almost 1 million views on his Instagram account.

On 10 September 2019, a one-minute teaser was released and a day after on 11 September, the full song was premiered which was viewed more than 500,000 times within an hour of release and was trending on #1 on YouTube. On 6 April 2020, a full version video song was released on YouTube by Tips Music.

=== Remix ===
A remix by DJ Akbar Sami was also released on 19 December 2019. The remix version includes alaaps by Salman Ali.

== Personnel ==
Song credits from YouTube video:

- Singer: Himesh Reshammiya & Ranu Mondal
- Music: Himesh Reshammiya
- Lyrics: Shabbir Ahmed
- Music Programmer: Aditya Dev
- Himesh Reshammiya's Team: Suhas Parab, Subhash Parab, Priyesh Vakil, Sakar Apte, Pratik Panchal & Barzin Contractor.
- Aditya Dev's Music Assistant: Gaurav Singh
- Sound Engineers: Salman Shaikh and Anudutt Shamain at HR Musik Studio
- Mixed and Mastered by Salman Shaikh at HR Musik Studio
- HR Musik Creative Team: Rajendra Toraskar, Rahul Sheth & Prakash Serrao.
- Guitarist: Vivek Verma

== Reception ==
The song was warmly received by audiences and praised by critics. It also became the second most searched song and most searched Hindi song on Google in 2019. Soon, after the release, the song was trending on TikTok and it was hashatagged more than 80 million times on that platform.

Platform	Pos.	Ref
Google most searched song of 2019 in India	2	

Mondal collaborated with Reshammiya on two other soundtrack songs named "Aadat" and "Aashiqui Mein Teri 2.0", the latter being a remade song from Reshammiya's previous musical film 36 China Town.
