= Vipin Aneja =

Indian playback singer in Bollywood

Vipin Aneja is an Indian playback singer in Bollywood. He sang the popular song 'Jaane Tere Shehar Ka' in the movie Jazbaa which stars the likes of Irrfan Khan and Aishwarya Rai.

He got his Bollywood break with the song ‘Saheb Bada Hathila’ in the movie Saheb, Biwi Aur Gangster. The movie stars the likes of Mahie Gill, Jimmy Shergill and Randeep Hooda.

== Early life ==
He was born and brought up in Delhi. He has a degree in Business Administration from the New York State University but chose music as his career.

== Career ==
His first original non-film commercial project was an album called ‘Teri Payal’ that came out in 2001 which did well. He is more popular for singing the remixed version of the old Hindi film song Gulabi Ankhen, which was a part of the album Salute to Bollywood. He won prestigious National and International Awards like All India Sangam Kala in India and Azia Dausy, a World Pop Music Festival in Kazakhstan.

He performed for AR Rahman’s world peace concert, ‘Unity of Light’, and travelled with the musician to Dubai and Malaysia, amongst other countries. He was also a lead singer of the band 'Sixth Sense' in the 'Idea Rocks India' show on Colors (TV channel).

He also paid a tribute to Govinda at the Mirchi Music Awards. Next, he is gearing up to sing for the films Dee Saturday Night, Sonali Cable and Desi Magic. He is currently a part of a panel of 30 grand jury members at Sa Re Ga Ma Pa Li'l Champs 2017 who are experts from the music fraternity.

== Filmography ==
- Saheb, Biwi Aur Gangster
- Jazbaa
- Sarkar
- Himesh Ke Dil Se
