= Badass Ravi Kumar =

2025 Indian film by Keith Gomes

- Theatrical release poster
- Directed by: Keith Gomes
- Written by: Kushal Ved Bakshi; Himesh Reshammiya
- Dialogues by: Bunty Rathore
- Produced by: Himesh Reshammiya
- Starring: Himesh Reshammiya; Prabhu Deva; Simona J; Kirti Kulhari; Sunny Leone; Sulabha Arya; Navneet Nishan; Johnny Lever; Sanjay Mishra; Manish Wadhwa; Rajesh Sharma; Pawan Malhotra; Mohan Joshi; Raza Murad; Saurabh Sachdeva; Prashant Narayanan; Anil George
- Cinematography: Manoj Soni
- Edited by: Rameshwar S. Bhagat
- Music by: Himesh Reshammiya
- Production company: Himesh Reshammiya Melodies
- Distributed by: AA Films
- Release date: 7 February 2025
- Running time: 142 minutes
- Country: India
- Language: Hindi
- Box office: ₹9.66 crore

Badass Ravi Kumar is a 2025 Indian Hindi-language action film directed by Keith Gomes in his feature film directorial debut and produced by Himesh Reshammiya Melodies. It is a spin-off of the 2014 film The Xposé and serves as the second installment in The Xposé Universe, with Himesh Reshammiya reprising his role as Ravi Kumar in the lead. The supporting cast includes Prabhu Deva, Simona J, Kirti Kulhari, Sunny Leone, Saurabh Sachdeva, Sanjay Mishra, Johnny Lever, Manish Wadhwa, Rajesh Sharma, Pawan Malhotra, Mohan Joshi, Sulabha Arya, Navneet Nishan, Raza Murad, and Prashant Narayanan.

The film was announced in November 2022, with production starting in September 2023 and wrapping up in April 2024. Filming took place in India, Oman, and the United Kingdom. The music was composed by Himesh Reshammiya, with cinematography by Manoj Soni, choreography by Ganesh Acharya, and editing by Rameshwar S. Bhagat.

Badass Ravi Kumar released on 7 February 2025 and received mixed reviews from critics.

== Plot ==
In 1989 Muscat, Syed Bashir, a Pakistani official, commissions dance‑loving don Carlos Pedro Panther to recover a secret film reel that reportedly contains locations and aliases of Indian secret agents and missile codes. The reel subsequently comes into the possession of Laila, who obtained it after killing her husband. Bangles over payment negotiations, Laila plans a rendezvous with Carlos in India, prompting intervention from Interpol and Delhi police.

Former maverick Delhi cop Ravi Kumar, known for killing corrupt criminals and defying orders, is reinstated for the mission. Accompanied by Interpol agent Mahavir Ahuja, Commissioner Awasthi, and quirky sidekicks Raja and Rana, Ravi embarks on a globe‑trotting chase to retrieve the reel before it falls into enemy hands.

In Muscat, Ravi faces off against a colorful array of goons led by Carlos and his lieutenant Jagawar. After a stylized diamond‑heist scene and numerous over‑the‑top confrontations, Ravi reconnects with his old flame Madhubala, who happens to be Laila's sister. As the mission escalates, Carlos abducts Madhubala, forcing Ravi into a final showdown. In a climactic battle, Ravi infiltrates Carlos's hideout and kills him, avenging both national security and personal loss. The film ends with a reveal that Carlos's brother, Carlis Pedro Panther, is out for revenge, hinting at further conflict.

== Cast ==
- Himesh Reshammiya as Badass Ravi Kumar
- Prabhu Deva in a dual role as
  - Carlos Pedro Panther
  - Carlis Pedro Panther (cameo)
- Simona J as Madhubala, Laila's younger sister
- Kirti Kulhari as Laila Khanna, Madhubala's elder sister
- Sunny Leone as Undercover Cop Nisha
- Johnny Lever as Raja
- Sanjay Mishra as Rana
- Saurabh Sachdeva as Police Commissioner Awasthi
- Prashant Narayanan as Interpol officer Mahavir Ahuja
- Manish Wadhwa as Zahid Bashir
- Rajesh Sharma as Jagawar Choudhary
- Anil George as Beriya Bhujang
- Mustafa Askari as Raftaar Khan
- Sulabha Arya as Shayam's mother, Ravi Kumar's grandmother
- Pawan Malhotra as Shayam, Ravi Kumar's father
- Navneet Nishan as Shayam's wife (widow), Ravi Kumar's mother
- Mohan Joshi as Minister
- Naresh Suri as Astrologer
- Vishal Goswami
- Varun Buddhadev
- KK Taharpuriya
- Sonia Kapoor (role unspecified)
- Badshah as Kenny Damania 2.0

== Production ==
The film was announced in November 2022 and went on production started in September 2023 and wrapped up in April 2024, with filming held in India, Oman and the United Kingdom. Stunt Silva served as the action director for the film.

== Soundtrack ==
Badass Ravi Kumar

Soundtrack album by Himesh Reshammiya
- Released: 20 August 2025
- Recorded: 2024–2025
- Genre: Feature film soundtrack
- Length: 87:17
- Language: Hindi
- Label: Himesh Reshammiya Melodies

Himesh Reshammiya chronology
Naam (2024)	Badass Ravi Kumar (2025)	Yeh Prem Mol Liya (2026)

Himesh Reshammiya composed the music and background score for the film with one song "Barsaat" composed by Sanjeev Darshan. The soundtrack was composed by Reshammiya, with lyrics written by Mayur Puri, Sameer Anjaan, Reshammiya, Shabbir Ahmed, Kumaar and Sonia Kapoor.

Track listing
No.	Title	Lyrics	Singer(s)	Length
1.	"Dil Ke Taj Mahal Meinn"	Mayur Puri	Himesh Reshammiya	4:27
2.	"Hookstep Hookah Bar"	Himesh Reshammiya	Himesh Reshammiya, Sunidhi Chauhan, Shannon K	4:35
3.	"Bazaar-E-Ishq"	Shabbir Ahmed	Himesh Reshammiya, Shreya Ghoshal	4:29
4.	"Terre Pyaar Mein"	Himesh Reshammiya	Himesh Reshammiya	5:33
5.	"Tandoori Days"	Himesh Reshammiya	Himesh Reshammiya, Aditi Singh Sharma	4:05
6.	"Butterfly Titliyan"	Sonia Kapoor	Himesh Reshammiya	5:15
7.	"Aafaton Ke Daur Mein"	Shabbir Ahmed	Himesh Reshammiya, Salman Ali, Jyotica Tangri, Nitn Kumar, Sachin Valmiki, Nishta Sharma, Ankona Mukherjee	4:48
8.	"Barsaat" (Music by: Sanjeev Darshan)	Sameer Anjaan	Himesh Reshammiya	3:51
9.	"Paani Paani Sajna"	Himesh Reshammiya	Himesh Reshammiya, Arunita Kanjilal	4:55
10.	"Aaj Mehfil Mein"	Himesh Reshammiya	Himesh Reshammiya, Kavya Limaye	5:38
11.	"Terre Pyaar Mein (Reprise 1)"	Himesh Reshammiya	Himesh Reshammiya, Shreya Bajpai, Arpita Bhattacharya	4:14
12.	"Aajaa Aajaa Pardesi"	Sameer Anjaan	Himesh Reshammiya	5:20
13.	"Aajaa Piyaa"	Kumaar	Himesh Reshammiya, Divya Kumar, Rupali Jagga, Sana Arora	4:51
14.	"Lut Gaye Tere Ishk Mein"	Himesh Reshammiya	Himesh Reshammiya	4:29
15.	"Medley"	Himesh Reshammiya, Shabbir Ahmed, Sameer Anjaan	Himesh Reshammiya, Aditi Singh Sharma, Shreya Ghoshal, Salman Ali, Jyotica Tangri, Nitn Kumar, Sachin Valmiki, Nishta Sharma, Ankona Mukherjee, Arunita Kanjilal, Kavya Limaye	11:18
16.	"Laila O Laila" (Music by: Sanjeev Darshan)	Sameer Anjaan	Himesh Reshammiya	4:42
17.	"Chand Baaliyaan"	Himesh Reshammiya	Himesh Reshammiya, Sana Arora	4:47
Total length:				87:17

== Release ==
=== Theatrical ===
Badass Ravi Kumar was theatrically released on 7 February 2025. It was initially planned to release on 11 October 2024, coinciding with Vijayadashami, but was postponed to 7 February 2025. On January 29, 2025, the Central Board of Film Certification (CBFC) granted Badass Ravi Kumar a UA 16+ certificate following several mandated edits. These included the blurring of alcohol branding and middle-finger gestures, toning down of sensual visuals (such as bikini and cleavage shots, thigh/hip close-ups), muting profanity (specifically the word “bitch”), and softening of graphic violence.

=== Pre-release business ===
The film has already recovered its production costs (₹20 crore) through music rights (₹16 crore) and subsidies (₹4 crore). Reshammiya waived his fee for a profit-sharing deal.

=== Home media ===
After a theatrical run beginning on February 7, 2025, Badass Ravi Kumar has yet to make its debut on OTT platforms as of May 2025. Multiple streaming giants reportedly tabled lucrative offers shortly after the theatrical release. However, the film's digital distribution has been stalled by a contractual clause proposed by producer–star Himesh Reshammiya: OTT platforms would only get the rights to stream the full film, while all promotional clips, music videos, and highlight reels would remain the exclusive domain of Himesh Reshammiya Melodies's YouTube channel.

This stipulation is cited as the primary reason for the delay in a standard 8‑week theatrical-to-digital window, which would typically have seen the film available online by early April. The impasse has prompted ongoing negotiations, with streaming services reportedly still interested but seeking a balance between rights to promotional content and Himesh's desire to control YouTube distribution.

Ultimately, the film's OTT rights were acquired by JioHotstar and are scheduled to be released on 18 April 2026, around 14 months after the theatrical release.

== Reception ==
=== Critical response ===
The film received mixed reviews from critics and audiences. Bollywood Hungama rated it 3/5 stars and describe it as "thoroughly entertaining" and emphasise the madness and 80s-style narrative. Amit Bhatia of ABP News rated this fim 1/5 stars and wrote, "Himesh Reshammiya Starrer Proves Some Films Shouldn’t Exist". Titas Chowdhury from News18 gave 4/5 stars to this movie and wrote, "A Mad Joyride That Marks Himesh Reshammiya's Transition To Lord Himesh".

=== Box office ===
The film collected ₹3.52 crore on its opening day and earned ₹7.77 crore on its first weekend. It concluded its run with a gross estimated to be ₹9.66 crore.

== Awards and accolades ==
Award	Date of ceremony	Category	Nominee	Result	Ref.
Most Iconic Entertainer	27 March 2025	Pinkvilla Screen and Style Icons Awards (Most Iconic Entertainer)	Himesh Reshammiya	Won	
