= Sihri =

- Village
- Location in Haryana, India Sihri (India)
- Coordinates: 27°49′25.95″N 77°10′1.61″E
- Country: India
- State: Haryana
- District: Nuh

Government
  - Body: Gram Panchayat, Sihri-Singalheri

Languages
  - Official: Hindi
- Time zone: UTC+5:30 (IST)
- PIN: 122508
- ISO 3166 code: IN-HR
- Vehicle registration: HR
- Lok Sabha constituency: Gurgaon (Lok Sabha constituency)
- Vidhan Sabha constituency: Punahana
- Civic agency: Gram Panchayat, Sihri-Singalheri
- Website: haryana.gov.in

Sihri or Sihiri is a small village located in Punahana Tehsil of Nuh district in the Haryana state, India. Sihri is 5 km away from Punahana the nearest city. The Village is located at the bottom of a small hillock, in an area shaped like the letter "C". The literacy rate is around 55—60%. There is one government high school shared by two village, Sihri And Singalheri.The local government system, or Gram panchayat, is common to both villages. It is around 25 km away from National Highway 2, which runs from Delhi to Mathura.

== Geography and Climate ==
Sihri is surrounded by number of small villages like Laharwari, Singalheri, Jaimat, Ghusinha, Jamalgarh, Luhingha and Piproli. Sihri is very close to a small river which was inaugurated by former Haryana chief minister Chaudhary Devi Lal. This river is also the seasonal source of irrigation in nearby villages. This river is mainly a drainage for outskirts of Gurgaon and Ballabhgarh cities but serves irrigation and other agricultural related purposes in this area. Village witnesses lush greenery in winter season and land goes dry in summers. In Summer temperature goes as high as 45 °C and in winter temperature generally lies in the range of 7° to 20 °C sometime falling as low as 0 °C.

In May 2009, after months of media and public protests, supported by several environmental groups, the Supreme Court banned mining in a 448 km^{2} area across the Faridabad, Gurgaon and Mewat districts in Haryana. Previously reserved for national park lands, the change followed an earlier judgment in 1994 which allowed limited mining on the basis of the sustainable development principle, and under strict guidelines. The court ruled that these principles had been violated by local miners.

However, there are many illegal mines in Rajasthan, some of them operating at the edges of the Sariska Tiger Reserve.

== Gallery ==
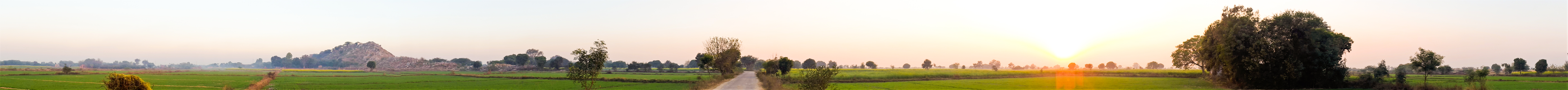
Sihri in a panorama
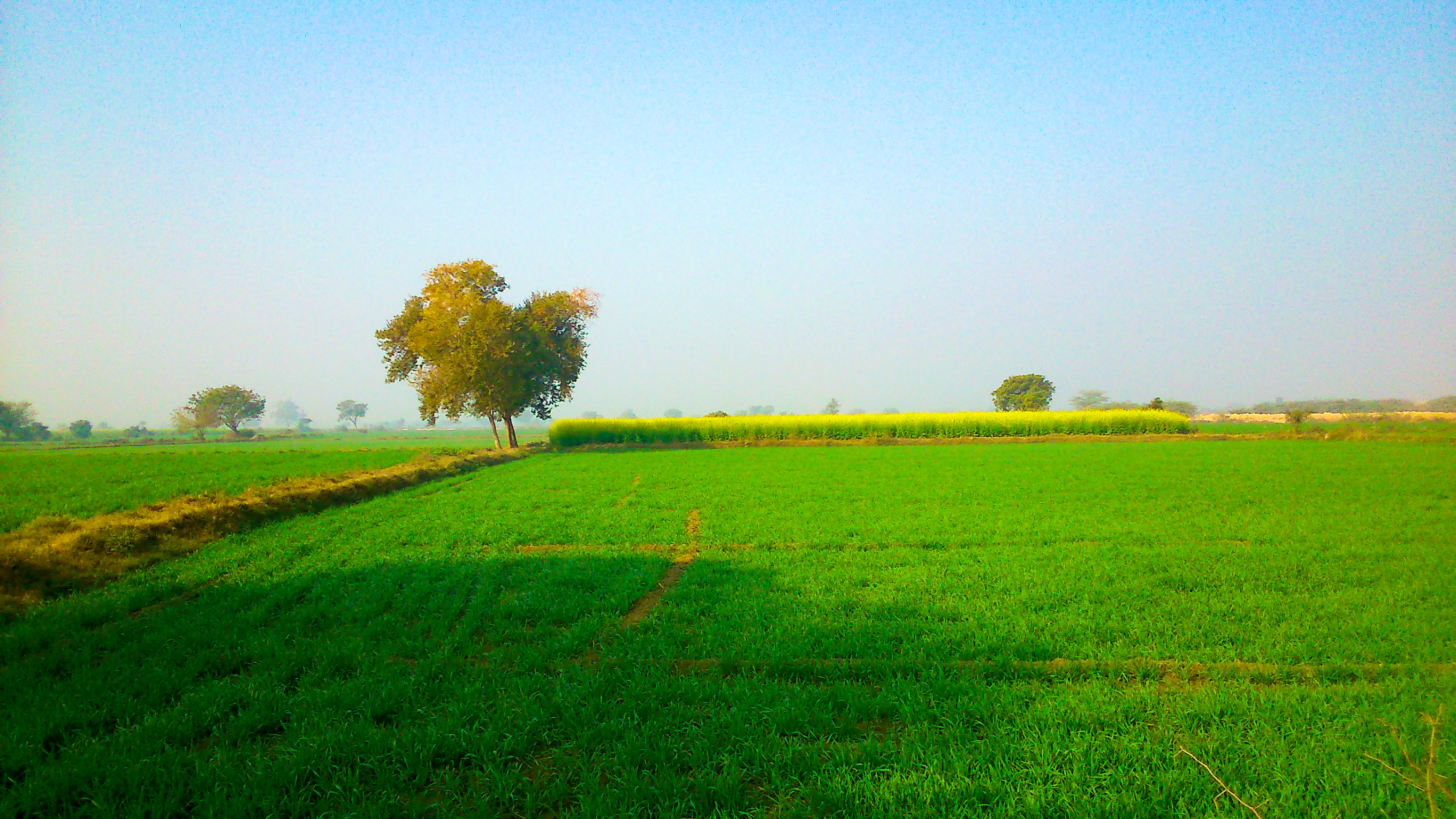

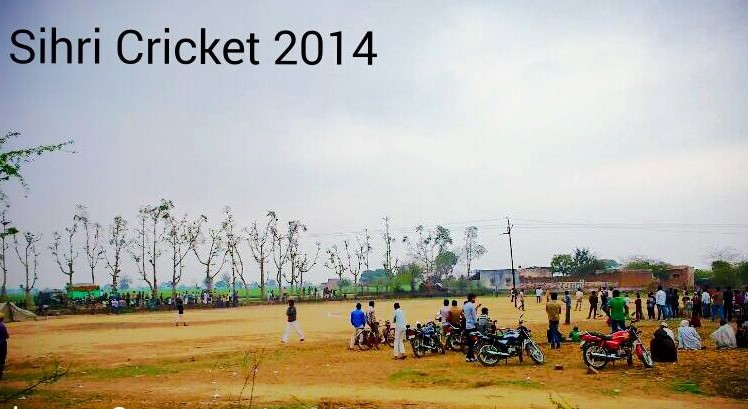
A cricket tournament going on in Sihri during 2014

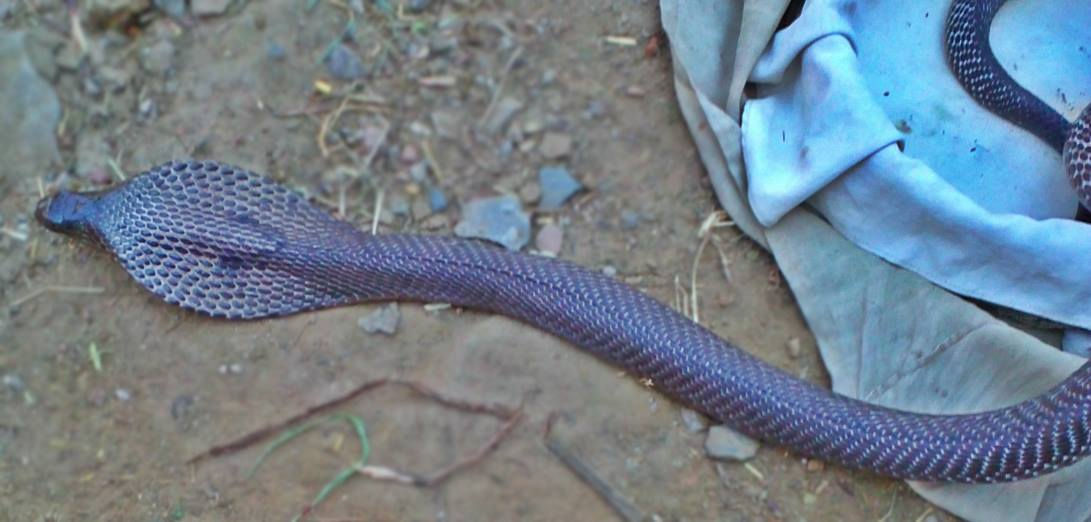
A snake charmer displaying Indian Kobra to Public

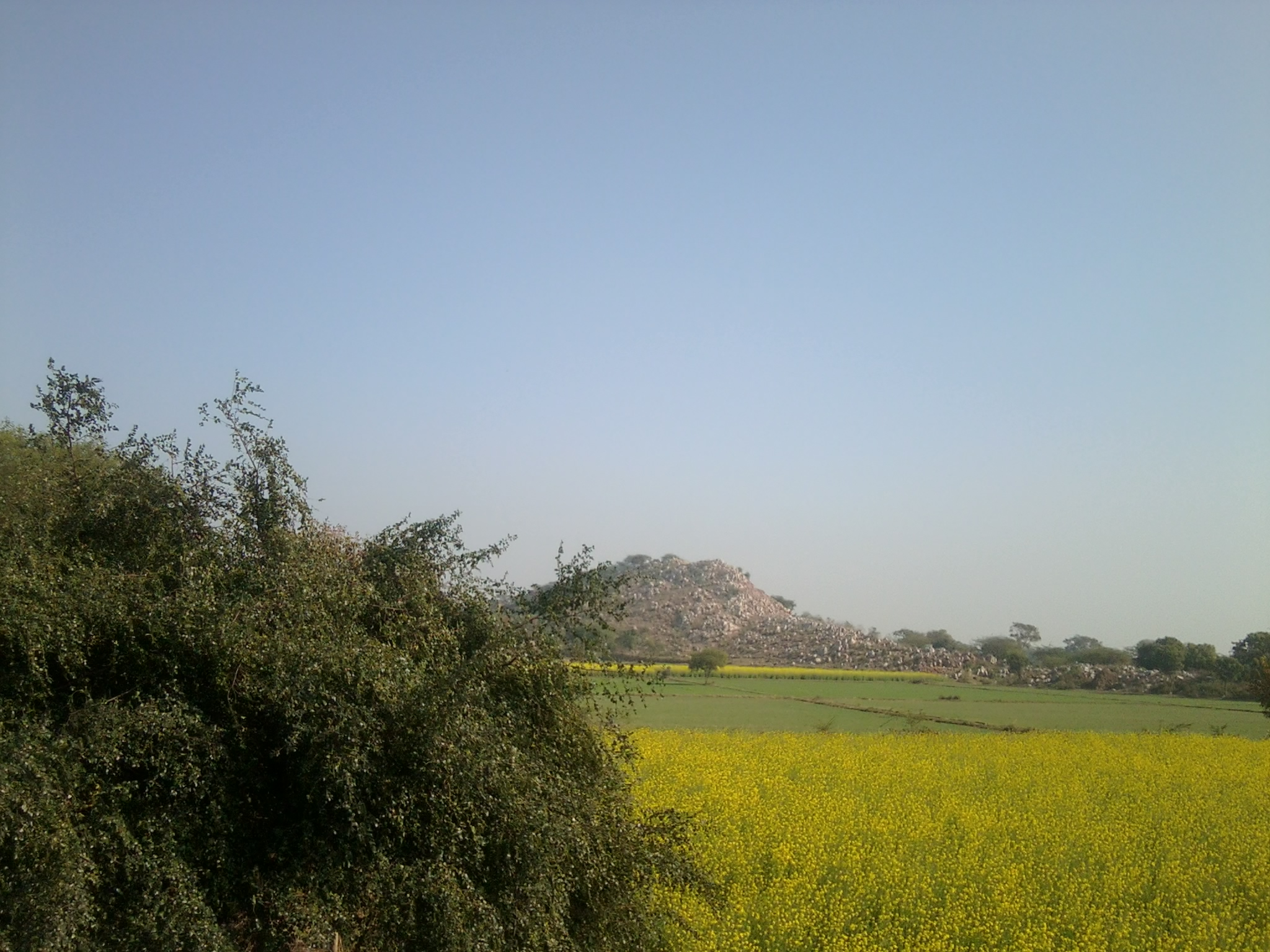

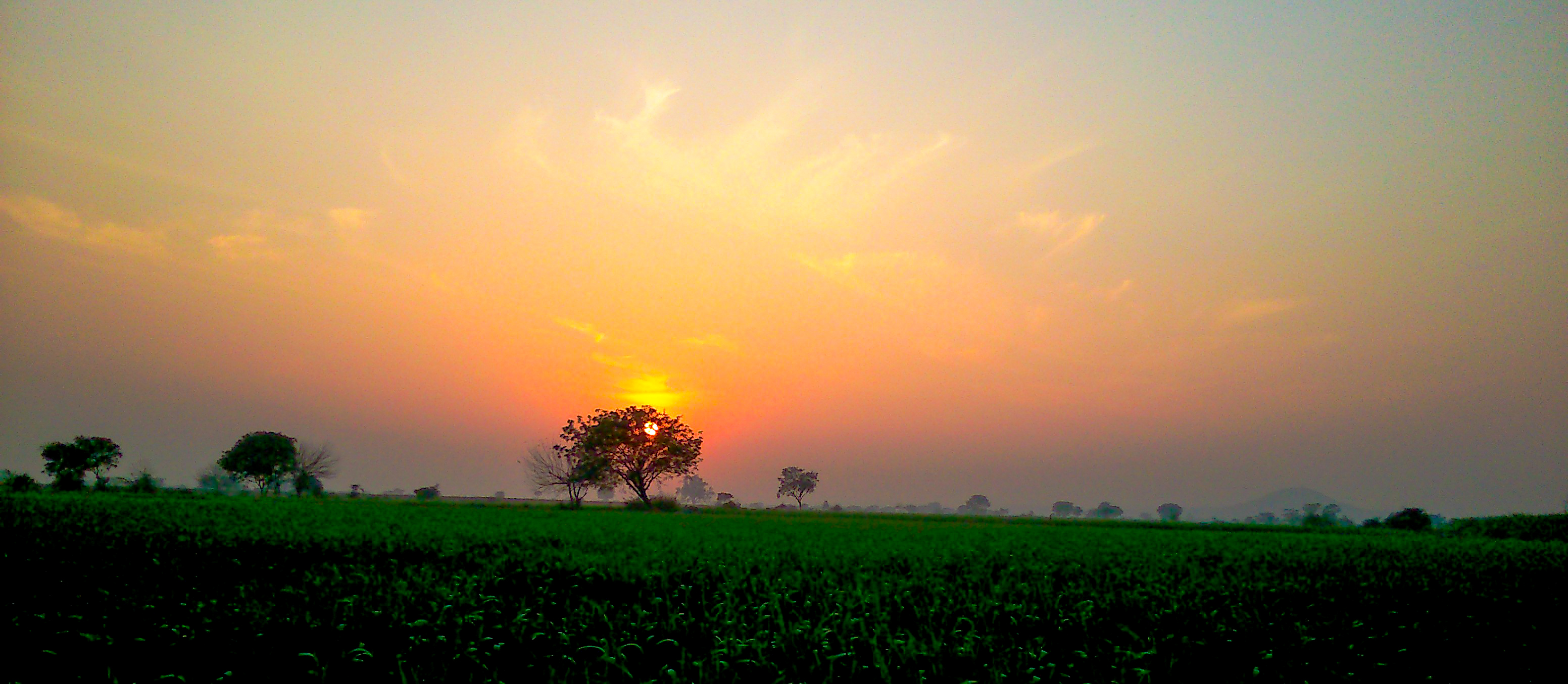

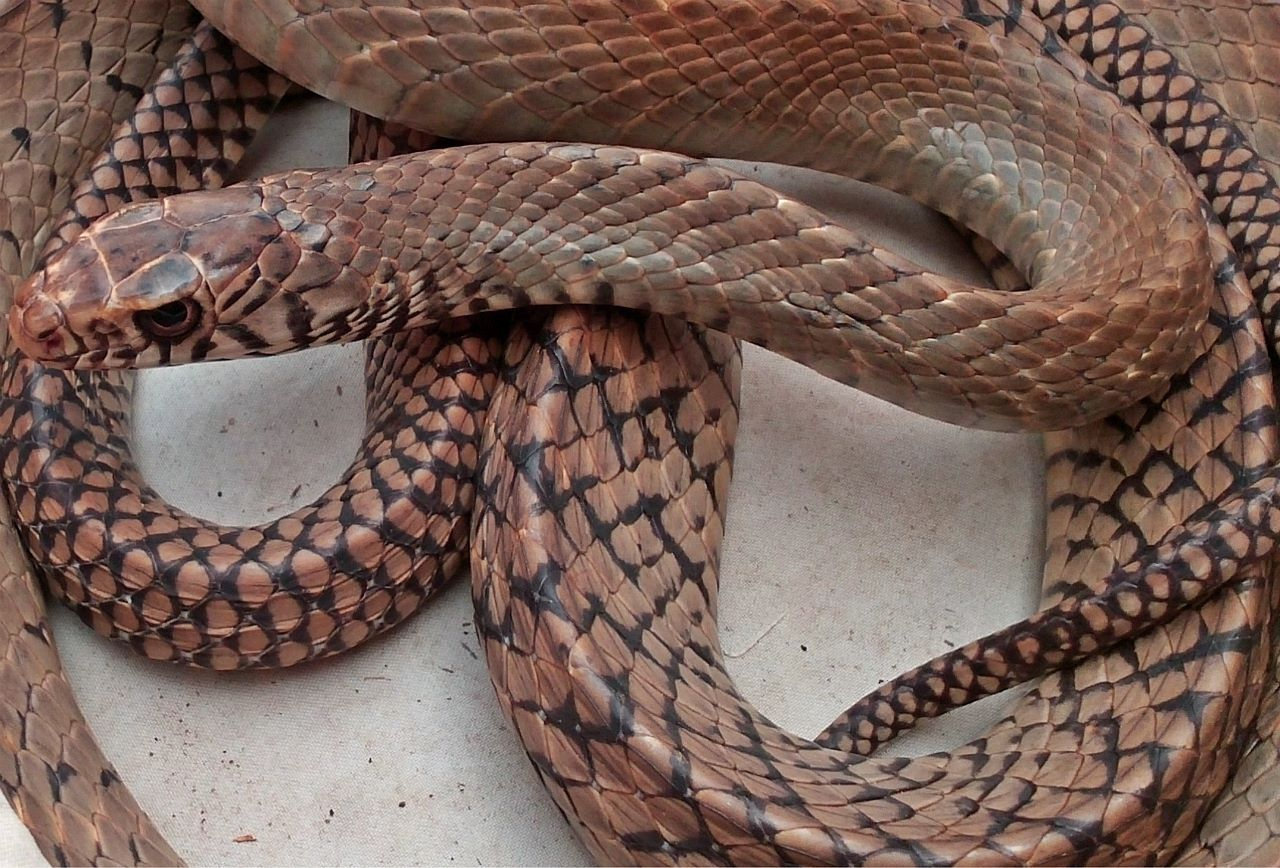
A Snake Charmer displaying Rat snake (farmer's friend) to public

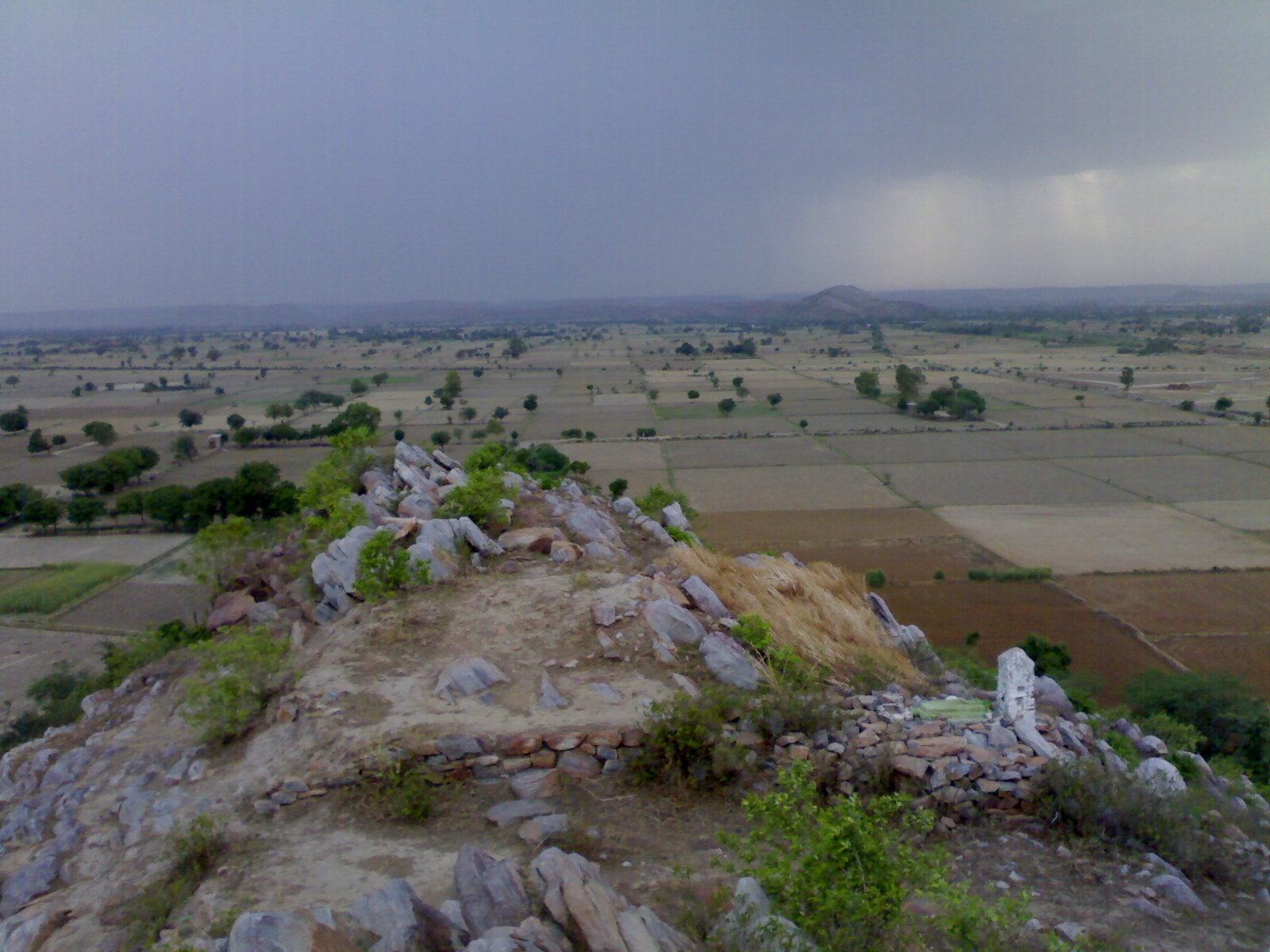

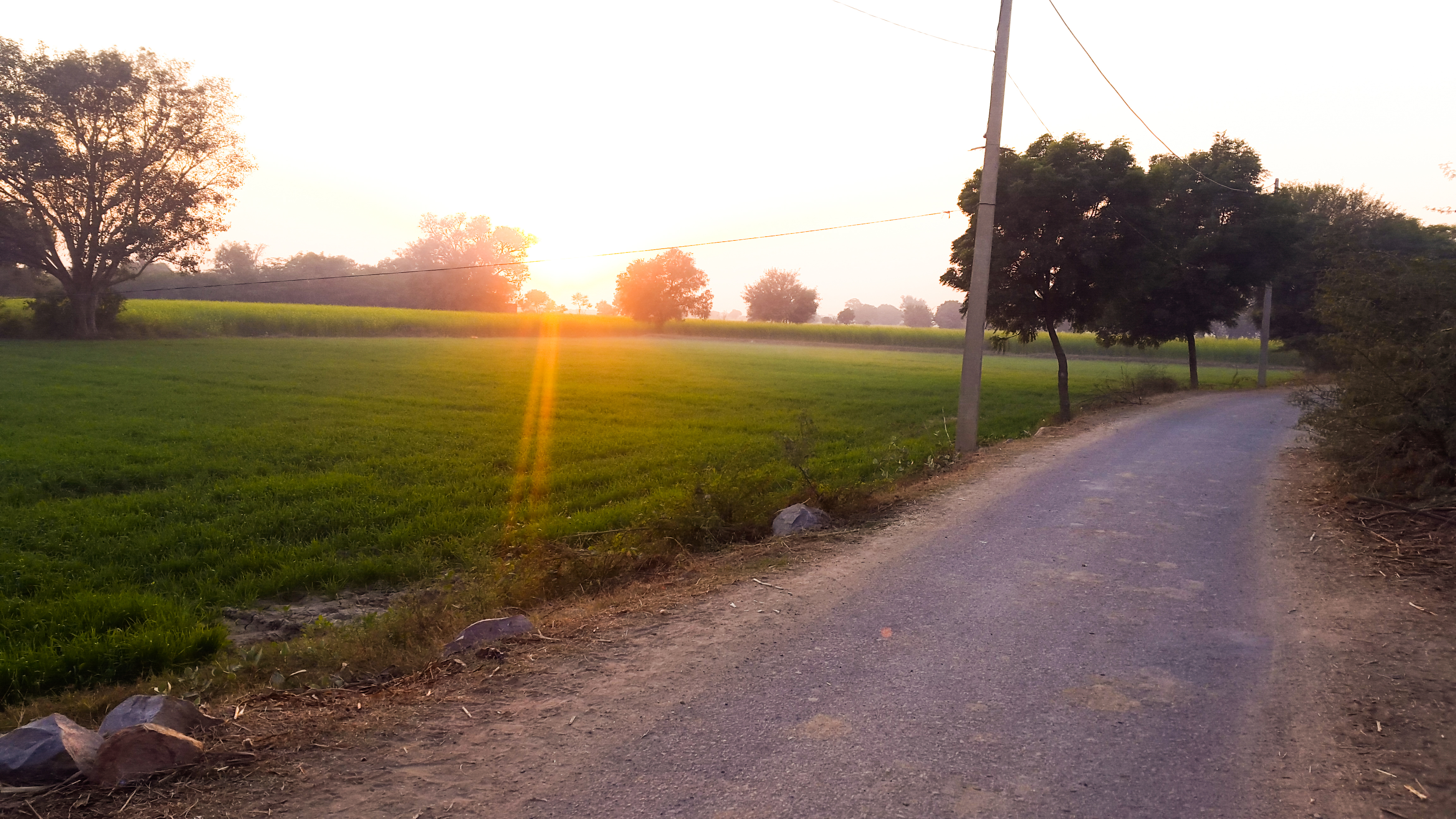

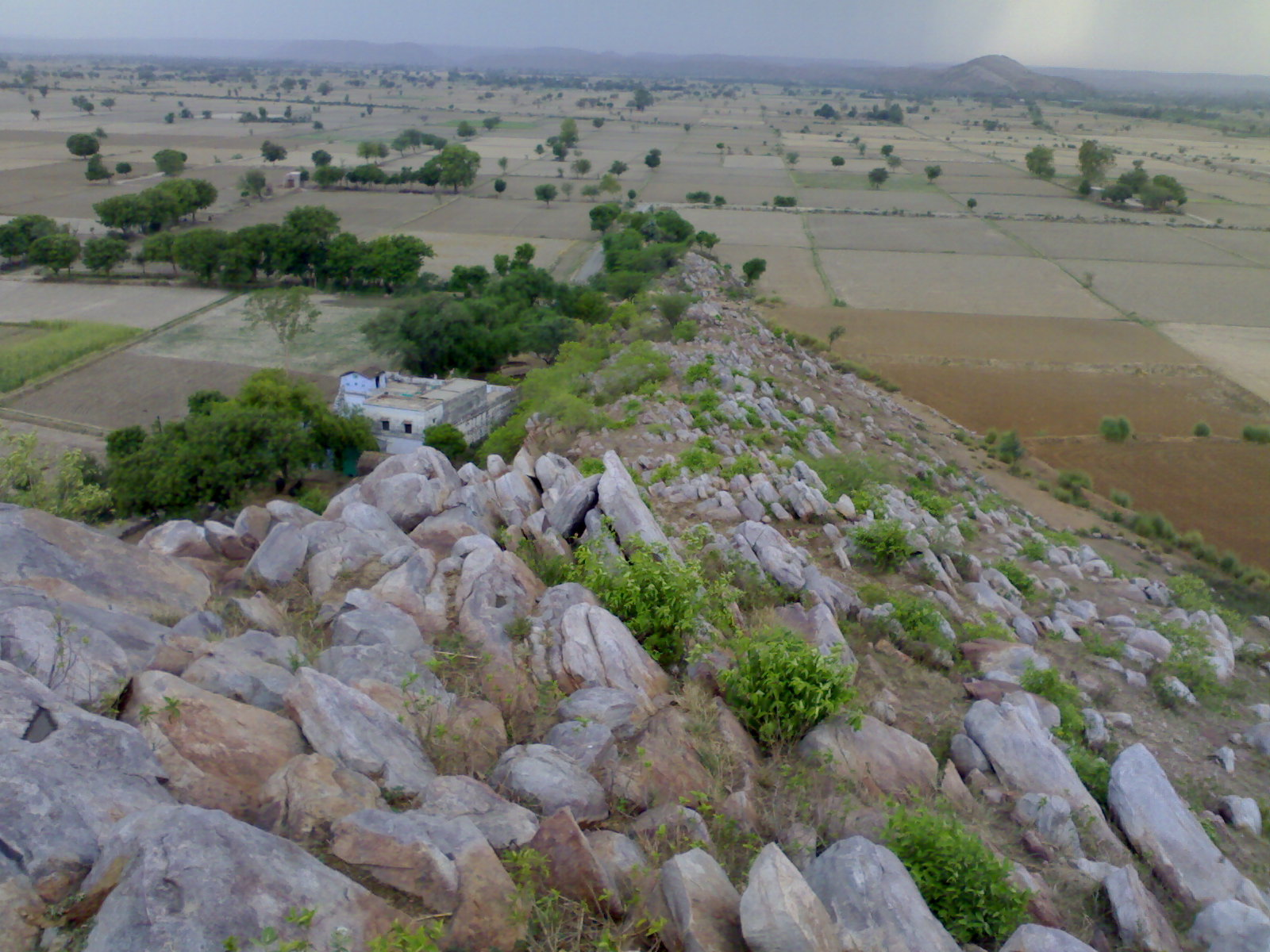

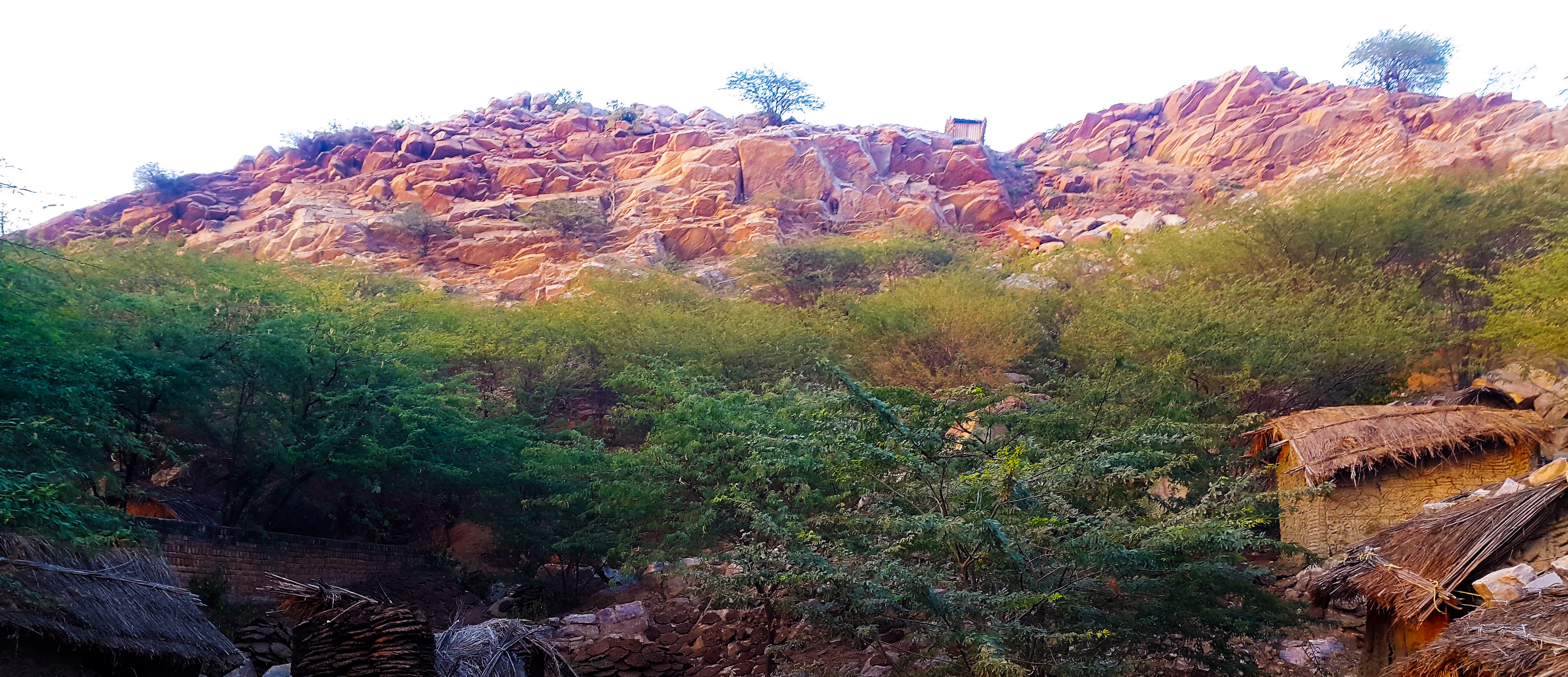

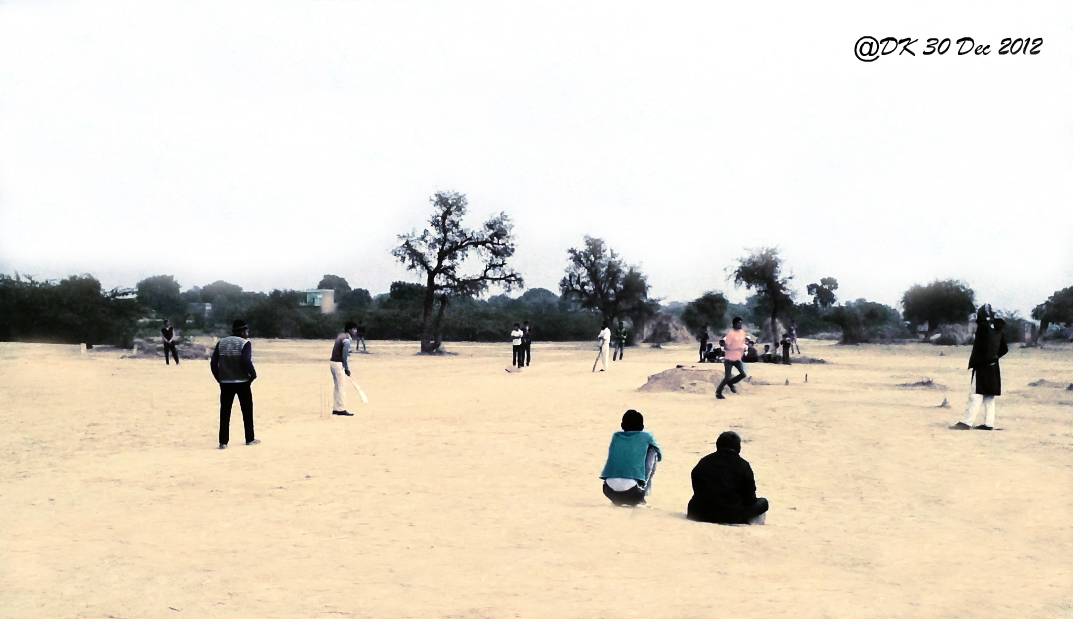
Sihri Villagers playing friendly cricket match in Piproli

== Nearby Towns ==
- Pinangwan
- Punahana
- Nuh
