= Himesh Ke Dil Se =

Studio album by Himesh Reshammiya

Studio album by Himesh Reshammiya
- Released: 2021
- Venue: Mumbai
- Studio: HR Musik Limited
- Language: Hindi
- Label: Himesh Reshammiya Melodies
- Producer: Himesh Reshammiya

Himesh Reshammiya chronology
Moods with Melodies (2021)	Himesh Ke Dil Se (2021)	Super Sitaara (2021)

Himesh Ke Dil Se (transl. From the Heart of Himesh) is the fifth studio album by Himesh Reshammiya, produced by Reshammiya under the banner Himesh Reshammiya Melodies. It is the third album to be released by Reshammiya in 2021 following Surroor 2021 and Moods with Melodies. This album features mostly emerging singers of India, particularly contestants from Indian Idol 12.

== Singers ==
The songs were sung by some participants of the Indian Idol 12, including the winner Pawandeep Rajan, the first runner-up Arunita Kanjilal, Sawai Bhatt, Mohammad Danish, Nihal Tauro, Ashish Kulkarni, Samyak Prasana, Sireesha Bhagavatula, Nachiket Lele, Sonakshi Kar and Sayli Kamble.

Other singers including Palak Muchhal, Mohammad Irfan, Harshdeep Kaur, Aditya Narayan, Stebin Ben, Salman Ali, Arpita Mukherjee, Meer Jasu, Rupali Jagga, Shekinah Mukhiya, Aasa Singh, Ankush Bhardwaj, Garima Yajnik, Raj Barman, Shreya Bajpai, Mohammad Faiz, Ankona Mukherjee, Sristhi Bhandari, Rupam Bharnarhia, Risharb Chaturvedi, Nishtha Sharma, Snigdhajit Bhowmik, Sharad Sharma, Sunny Hindustani, Dipayan Banerjee, Neelanjana Ray, Ashutosh Kumar Jha, Amarjeet Jaikar, Rajashri Bag, Saaj Bhatt, Mani Dharamkot, Himanshu Yadav, Senjuti Das, Mohit Chauhan, Rishi Singh, Shivam Singh, Rohit Raut, Arun Dev Yadav, Mona Bhatt, Chetna Bhardwaj, Soyab Ali, Srishti Bhandari, Navdeep Wadali, Tushar Arjun, Karthik Kumar Krishnamurthy, Shibani Kashap, Albert Lepcha, Vipin Aneja, Biswajit Mahapatra, Tabish Ali, Sneha Shankar, Vejayalakshmi Puli, Abdul Shaikh and Ranita Banerjee have also appeared on the Album.

== Track listing ==
The first song of the album "Sanseinn" was sung by Sawai Bhatt, an Indian Idol 12 contestant who being belonged to Rajasthan, the song has some Rajsthani folk touch.

The second song, "Dagaa" was sung by another Indian Idol 12 contestant Mohammad Danish, while lyrics were written by Sameer.

The third song, "Terii Umeed" which was released on 23 July, Reshammiya's 48th birthday, was sung by Indian Idol 12's duo Pawandeep Rajan and Arunita Kanjilal.

"O Sajnaa", fourth song of the album was released on 6 September 2021, sung by Sawai Bhatt.

The fifth song, "O Saiyyonii", a peppy number, sung by Pawandeep and Arunita, was released on 14 September,

The song "Lagann Lagii" was released in two versions, one in sufi version, which was sung by Meer Jasu while the original version was sung by Mohammad Danish and Sayli Kamble.

The song "Piya Ji Ke Sanng" was sung by Arunita Kanjilal, was released on 13 October 2021.

On 23 July 2022, on the occasion of Reshammiya's birthday, the song "Dhinakk Dhin Dhaa", sung by Ankush Bharadwaj and Shreya Bajpai, was released. The 50th song of the album, "Tu Hi Hai Sanam", sung by Pawandeep Rajan, was released on 3 August 2022.

On 12 March 2023, the song "Teri Aashiqui Ne Maarraa" which was earlier sung by Mohammad Irfan was re-released with the name "Teri Aashiqui Ne Maarraa 2.0", being sung by Amarjeet Jaikar, a Bihar-based boy who recently went viral on social media singing "Dil De Diya Hai" song from the film Masti and was offered a song by Reshammiya when he was invited in an episode of Indian Idol 13.

All songs were composed by Reshammiya, while lyrics were penned by Reshammiya, Sameer, Shabbir Ahmed, Sonia Kapoor and Manish Shukla.

All the songs begin with a shayari by Reshammiya followed by renditions by respective singers.

=== Originals ===
No.	Song	Lyrics	Singer(s)	Duration	Release date
1	Sanseinn	Himesh Reshammiya	Sawai Bhatt	3:52	3 July 2021
2	Dagaa	Sameer	Mohammad Danish	4:23	13 July 2021
3	Terii Umeed	Himesh Reshammiya	Pawandeep Rajan, Arunita Kanjilal	4:30	23 July 2021
4	O Sajnaa	Himesh Reshammiya	Sawai Bhatt	5:23	6 September 2021
5	O Saiyyonii	Himesh Reshammiya	Pawandeep Rajan, Arunita Kanjilal	4:57	14 September 2021
6	Agarr Tumm Naa Hote	Sameer	Nihal Tauro	5:29	20 September 2021
7	Bas Terre Ho Gaye	Himesh Reshammiya	Ashish Kulkarni	3:20	23 September 2021
8	Jabb Se Tumko Dekhaa	Sameer	Stebin Ben	4:36	30 September 2021
9	Lagann Laagii	Himesh Reshammiya	Mohammed Danish, Sayli Kamble	4:59	1 October 2021
10	Lagann Laagii (Sufi Version)	Himesh Reshammiya	Meer Jasu	4:34	5 October 2021
11	Piya Ji Ke Sanng	Shabbir Ahmed	Arunita Kanjilal	4:03	13 October 2021
12	Aashiquii Kaa Gum	Himesh Reshammiya	Salman Ali	5:27	21 October 2021
13	Tumpe Mar Jaaenge	Himesh Reshammiya	Palak Muchhal	4:01	25 October 2021
14	Maujood Hai	Himesh Reshammiya	Sawai Bhatt	4:57	28 October 2021
15	Mehendi Ka Ranngg	Shabbir Ahmed	Nihal Tauro, Sayli Kamble	5:48	11 November 2021
16	Laal Hari Peeli Choodiyan	Himesh Reshammiya	Arunita Kanjilal	5:20	19 November 2021
17	Duaa Mein Yaad Rakhna	Himesh Reshammiya	Aditya Narayan	4:57	25 November 2021
18	Dard-E-Dil Kii Dawwa	Himesh Reshammiya	Mohammed Irfan, Arpita Mukherjee	5:16	18 January 2022
19	Meri Zindaggi Mein Aa	Himesh Reshammiya	Mohammad Danish	4:38	21 January 2022
20	Tenu Pyaarr Kardaa	Himesh Reshammiya	Harshdeep Kaur	4:39	25 January 2022
21	Bas Tum Mere Paas Raho	Sonia Kapoor	Salman Ali	4:32	28 January 2022
22	Jhaanjharriyaa	Himesh Reshammiya	Sawai Bhatt	3:58	8 February 2022
23	Bewafa Yaar	Himesh Reshammiya	Nihal Tauro	4:53	11 February 2022
24	Tere Dillaggi Mein	Himesh Reshammiya	Aditya Narayan	4:54	14 February 2022
25	Tum Dill Meinn Ho	Himesh Reshammiya	Palak Muchhal	4:45	21 February 2022
26	Terri Aashiqui Ne Maarraa	Shabbir Ahmed	Mohammed Irfan	3:31	28 February 2022
27	Piyaa Rangeela	Himesh Reshammiya	Rupali Jagga	4:08	3 March 2022
28	Aa Gale Se Lagga Le	Himesh Reshammiya	Arunita Kanjilal	5:48	4 April 2022
29	Tumheinn Apna Banaana Hain	Himesh Reshammiya	Salman Ali	4:58	20 April 2022
30	Aajaa Bheeg Le Piyyaa	Himesh Reshammiya	Rupali Jagga	3:58	22 April 2022
31	Choodi Ye Tadpayeggi	Himesh Reshammiya	Shekinah Mukhiya	4:23	25 April 2022
32	Dil Teri Yaad Mein Roota Hai	Himesh Reshammiya	Sawai Bhatt	4:53	3 May 2022
33	Rab Kaa Ishhaara	Himesh Reshammiya	Shekinah Mukhiya	4:07	9 May 2022
34	Tu Mere Dil Mein Hai Rubaroo	Himesh Reshammiya	Aasa Singh	4:57	13 May 2022
35	Tere Bin Dil Yeh Mera	Himesh Reshammiya	Aditya Narayan	4:32	17 May 2022
36	Ab Tere Bin Nahi Jeena	Himesh Reshammiya	Ankush Bharadwaj	4:25	23 May 2022
37	Aao Naa	Himesh Reshammiya	Garima Yajnik	4:44	27 May 2022
38	Tumhaari Chaahatein	Himesh Reshammiya	Sayli Kamble	4:51	7 June 2022
39	Terre Naam Se	Himesh Reshammiya	Aakansha Sharma	4:20	13 June 2022
40	Tujhko Yeh Dil Diya	Himesh Reshammiya	Mohammed Danish	4:12	17 June 2022
41	Dorr Jaa Naa Saakoge	Himesh Reshammiya	Raj Barman	4:38	21 June 2022
42	Kaanta Lagaa Re	Himesh Reshammiya	Rupali Jagga	3:58	24 June 2022
43	Door Nahi Jaana Re	Himesh Reshammiya	Salman Ali	4:51	1 July 2022
44	Vaasta	Himesh Reshammiya	Samyak Prasana, Sireesha Bhagavatula	4:43	7 July 2022
45	De De Dill	Himesh Reshammiya	Sawai Bhatt	4:13	14 July 2022
46	Ek Pal Bhi Tummse Door	Himesh Reshammiya	Arunita Kanjilal, Sayli Kamble, Ashish Kulkarni	4:36	19 July 2022
47	Dhinakk Dhin Dhaa	Himesh Reshammiya	Ankush Bharadwaj, Shreya Bajpai	4:12	23 July 2022
48	Merre Liye	Himesh Reshammiya	Mohammed Faiz	3:59	27 July 2022
49	Teri Yaadonn Se	Himesh Reshammiya	Salman Ali	4:00	1 August 2022
50	Tu Hi Hai Sanam	Himesh Reshammiya	Pawandeep Rajan	4:00	3 August 2022
51	Meri Aankkhon Mein	Himesh Reshammiya	Aditya Narayan	3:49	8 August 2022
52	Janam Janamm	Himesh Reshammiya	Rupali Jagga	4:14	9 August 2022
53	Tu Banii Hai Merre Liye	Himesh Reshammiya	Samyak Prasana	3:38	12 August 2022
54	Meri Mehbooba	Himesh Reshammiya	Nachiket Lele	3:32	17 August 2022
55	Jaann Se Zyaadaa	Himesh Reshammiya	Mohammed Faiz	3:32	23 August 2022
56	Dill Kii Deewaanron Pe	Himesh Reshammiya	Nihal Tauro, Ankona Mukherjee	4:51	29 August 2022
57	Terre Liye	Himesh Reshammiya	Mohammed Faiz	3:48	5 September 2022
58	Meraa Chand Mujhse Door Hai	Himesh Reshammiya	Nihal Tauro, Garima Yagnik	4:32	9 September 2022
59	Saawarriya	Himesh Reshammiya	Sayli Kamble	3:50	16 September 2022
60	Dil Haaraa	Himesh Reshammiya	Pawandeep Rajan, Arunita Kanjilal	4:06	29 September 2022
61	Pyaarr Huaa	Himesh Reshammiya	Nihal Tauro	4:06	28 November 2022
62	Tere Liye Zamaanaa Chod Denge	Himesh Reshammiya	Srishti Bhandari	3:57	2 December 2022
63	Tere Bin Saajnaa	Himesh Reshammiya	Rupam Bharnarhia	4:43	5 December 2022
64	Tumhein Pyarr Kar Lenge	Himesh Reshammiya	Sayli Kamble	4:13	8 December 2022
65	Merii Maa	Himesh Reshammiya	Kavya Limya, Ashita Limya	4:27	9 December 2022
66	Teri Yaad Mein	Himesh Reshammiya	Salman Ali	4:24	13 December 2022
67	Koi Tum Jaisa Dilbarr	Himesh Reshammiya	Aditya Narayan	3:08	14 December 2022
68	O Yaara	Himesh Reshammiya	Sawai Bhatt	4:12	15 December 2022
69	Teri Deewwaangi Mein	Himesh Reshammiya	Rishabh Chaturvedi	3:44	16 December 2022
70	Tere Binaa Main Adhoori	Himesh Reshammiya	Nishtha Sharma	3:15	19 December 2022
71	Dil Kaa Saudaa	Himesh Reshammiya	Anushka Patra	3:32	21 December 2022
72	Tu Jo Mujhe Naa Mili	Himesh Reshammiya	Mohammed Faiz	3:36	4 January 2023
73	Paayyaliaa	Sonia Kapoor	Sayli Kamble	3:38	23 January 2023
74	Tu Hii Tu	Himesh Reshammiya	Mohammed Faiz	3:59	24 January 2023
75	Tujhko Maana Dil Ne Apnaa	Himesh Reshammiya	Snigdhajit Bhowmik	3:14	30 January 2023
76	Teri Maujoodgi	Himesh Reshammiya	Sharad Sharma	3:47	6 February 2023
77	Teri Galiyonn Se	Himesh Reshammiya	Arpita Mukherjee	3:56	14 February 2023
78	Ho Ke Dekho Tum Kabhie Hamaare	Himesh Reshammiya	Nihal Tauro	3:59	21 February 2023
79	Tuu Meraa Naginaa	Himesh Reshammiya	Sunny Hindustani	4:37	22 February 2023
80	Sheeshe Ke Ghar Mein	Himesh Reshammiya	Dipayan Banerjee	3:00	23 February 2023
81	Achchaa Hotaa	Sonia Kapoor	Mohammad Faiz	4:18	27 February 2023
82	Tumne Hamein	Himesh Reshammiya	Ankush Bharadwaj	3:47	1 March 2023
83	Main Hoon Tere Liye	Manish S. Shukla	Mohammed Irfan	3:38	2 March 2023
84	Bhool Naa Jaana	Himesh Reshammiya	Rupam Bharnarhia	4:38	4 March 2023
85	Tum Jo Haan Keh Do	Himesh Reshammiya	Neelanjana Ray	3:16	6 March 2023
86	Mann	Himesh Reshammiya	Nihal Tauro	4:06	10 March 2023
87	Arzoo Teri	Himesh Reshammiya	Ashutosh Kumar Jha	4:31	11 March 2023
88	Teri Aashiqui Ne Maarraa 2.0	Shabbir Ahmed	Amarjeet Jaikar	3:25	12 March 2023
89	Tum Jo Naa Hotey	Himesh Reshammiya	Rajashri Bag	4:30	13 March 2023
90	Rabba	Himesh Reshammiya	Sunny Hindustani	2:48	15 March 2023
91	Tumse Millte	Himesh Reshammiya	Sreerama Chandra	3:50	17 March 2023
92	Apna Dil De Diya	Himesh Reshammiya	Snigdhajit Bhowmik	3:33	20 March 2023
93	Tumpe Marr Jaengge 2.0	Himesh Reshammiya	Amarjeet Jaikar	3:59	22 March 2023
94	Chaand Raaton Mein 2.0	Himesh Reshammiya	Amarjeet Jaikar	3:36	23 March 2023
95	Dilnashin Mere Dilbarr	Himesh Reshammiya	Shahzan Mujeeb	3:51	24 March 2023
96	Bas Terre Ho Gaye 2.0	Himesh Reshammiya	Amarjeet Jaikar	3:51	25 March 2023
97	Pyaar Aayaa	Himesh Reshammiya	Mohammad Faiz	3:12	27 March 2023
98	Dard-E-Dil Kii Dawwa 2.0	Himesh Reshammiya	Amarjeet Jaikar	4:25	28 March 2023
99	Mausam Kii Tarah	Himesh Reshammiya	Saaj Bhatt	2:58	29 March 2023
100	Tumhein Apna Banaaana Hain Junior	Himesh Reshammiya	Mani Dharamkot	4:51	30 March 2023
101	Door Jaa Na Sakoge 2.0	Himesh Reshammiya	Amarjeet Jaikar	4:38	31 March 2023
102	Mera Dil Meri Jaann	Himesh Reshammiya	Ashish Kulkarni	3:24	1 April 2023
103	Merraa Akks 2.0	Himesh Reshammiya	Himanshu Yadav	4:10	3 April 2023
104	Tu Kisi Aur Ko Na Chaheinn 2.0	Himesh Reshammiya	Amarjeet Jaikar	4:14	5 April 2023
105	Zamaannaa 2.0	Himesh Reshammiya	Himanshu Yadav	3:56	8 April 2023
106	Pyaar Tummse Junior	Himesh Reshammiya	Mani Dharamkot	4:27	10 April 2023
107	Dill Kiii Deewaaron Pe 2.0	Himesh Reshammiya	Amarjeet Jaikar	4:50	12 April 2023
108	Pyarr Karr Loon	Himesh Reshammiya	Sayli Kamble	3:22	13 April 2023
109	Tum Jo Haan Kehh Do 2.0	Himesh Reshammiya	Sreerama Chandra	3:08	17 April 2023
110	Tum Manzile Maqqsood	Himesh Reshammiya	Himanshu Kumar	4:13	18 April 2023
111	Bas Tum Merre Pass Rahho Junior	Sonia Kapoor	Mani Dharamkot	4:29	20 April 2023
112	Tujhko Maana Dil Ne Apna 2.0	Himesh Reshammiya	Amarjeet Jaikar	3:12	21 April 2023
113	Tera Aanaa	Himesh Reshammiya	Salman Ali	3:09	24 April 2023
114	Apna Dill De Diyaa 2.0	Himesh Reshammiya	Amarjeet Jaikar	3:33	26 April 2023
115	Mere Dilbar Jaaniyaa	Himesh Reshammiya	Nihal Tauro	4:03	1 May 2023
116	Tere Naam Se 2.0	Himesh Reshammiya	Sreerama Chandra	4:18	3 May 2023
117	Aashiqui Baakkii Haii	Himesh Reshammiya	Palak Muchhal	3:59	4 May 2023
118	Agar Tum Na Hote 2.0	Sameer	Amarjeet Jaikar	4:47	5 May 2023
119	Aa Gale Se Lagaa Le 2.0	Himesh Reshammiya	Himanshu Kumar	4:53	10 May 2023
120	Iss Pyar Ko 2.0	Himesh Reshammiya	Senjuti Das	4:43	12 May 2023
121	Teri Chaahatt Meinn	Himesh Reshammiya	Mohammad Danish, Mohammad Faiz	4:30	15 May 2023
122	O Mere Channa Ve 2.0	Himesh Reshammiya	Neelanjana Ray	4:56	17 May 2023
123	Pyaar Huaa 2.0	Himesh Reshammiya	Amarjeet Jaikar	3:37	19 May 2023
124	Dekhte Reh Gaye	Himesh Reshammiya	Salman Ali	3:35	22 May 2023
125	O Re Piya	Himesh Reshammiya	Rajashri Bag	4:55	24 May 2023
126	Ho Ke Dekho Tum Kabhie Hamaare 2.0	Himesh Reshammiya	Amarjeet Jaikar	4:00	27 May 2023
127	Ae Merii Wafar 2.0	Himesh Reshammiya	Amarjeet Jaikar	3:58	5 June 2023
128	Shehedd Terre Naam Kaa	Himesh Reshammiya	Rupam Bharnariha	3:55	7 June 2023
129	Pyar Karta Hai Dil 2.0	Himesh Reshammiya	Himanshu Yadav	4:21	9 June 2023
130	Terre Dar Pe Aaye	Himesh Reshammiya	Sayli Kamble	4:55	12 June 2023
131	Benoor Saaye	Himesh Reshammiya	Mohit Chauhan	3:49	13 June 2023
132	Piya Milan	Himesh Reshammiya	Kavya Limaye	4:49	15 June 2023
133	Tere Bin Jiyun Kaise	Himesh Reshammiya	Sawai Bhatt	3:32	19 June 2023
134	Tu Jeene Ki Wajah	Himesh Reshammiya	Rishi Singh	4:45	21 June 2023
135	Kar Baithe Ishk Tumse	Himesh Reshammiya	Shivam Singh	3:35	23 June 2023
136	Teraa Meraa Rishta	Himesh Reshammiya	Salman Ali	4:17	26 June 2023
137	Zindagi Mein Aa Jaana	Himesh Reshammiya	Snigdhajit Bhowmik	4:55	27 June 2023
138		Himesh Reshammiya			
139	Terre Dar Pe Aaye 2.0	Himesh Reshammiya	Amarjeet Jaikar	4:56	28 June 2023
140	Tumko Hai Kasam	Himesh Reshammiya	Chirag Kotwal	4:33	29 June 2023
141	O Sajnaa Junior	Himesh Reshammiya	Mani Dharamkot	4:46	30 June 2023
142	Tere Bin Adhoori	Himesh Reshammiya	Rajashri Bag	3:19	3 July 2023
143	Bheegi Bheegi	Himesh Reshammiya	Vraj Kshatriya	4:43	5 July 2023
144	Tu Meraa Raja	Himesh Reshammiya	Sireesha Bhagavatula	3:36	6 July 2023
145	Tere Saath Mainn	Himesh Reshammiya	Senjuti Das	3:28	7 July 2023
146	Ek Pal Bhi Tummse Door 2.0	Himesh Reshammiya	Rishi Singh	4:36	10 July 2023
147	Beqasoor	Himesh Reshammiya	Kavya Limaye	4:12	12 July 2023
148	Teri Yaddon Kaa Saawan	Himesh Reshammiya	Sharad Sharma	4:29	13 July 2023
149	Teri Yaad Mein Junior	Himesh Reshammiya	Mani Dharamkot	4:25	14 July 2023
150	Sharabbe Mohabbat	Himesh Reshammiya	Kunal Ganjawala	3:49	17 July 2023
151	Tere Dard Mein	Himesh Reshammiya	Senjuti Das	4:12	19 July 2023
152	Dekhte Reh Gaye Junior	Himesh Reshammiya	Mani Dharamkot	3:36	20 July 2023
153	Tere Mera Naataa	Rachna Mishra	Neelanjana Ray	3:36	21 July 2023
154	Saanson Meinn	Himesh Reshammiya	Salman Ali	4:31	24 July 2023
155	Piyaa	Himesh Reshammiya	Ankona Mukherjee	4:43	25 July 2023
156	Tera Meraa Ishk	Himesh Reshammiya	Ankush Bhardwaj	4:35	26 July 2023
157	Tum Dhadkanon Mein	Himesh Reshammiya	Shreya Bajpai	3:57	27 July 2023
158	Tere Hawaale	Himesh Reshammiya	Nachiket Lele	3:44	28 July 2023
159	Dil Ki Sonni Raahonn Pe	Himesh Reshammiya	Amarjeet Jaikar	4:31	31 July 2023
160	Saath Yaara	Himesh Reshammiya	Aakanksha Sharma	4:52	1 August 2023
161	Tu Mera Aitbaarr	Himesh Reshammiya	Rohit Raut	4:23	2 August 2023
162	Tera Deewaana	Himesh Reshammiya	Kavya Limaye	4:39	3 August 2023
163	Kasme Vaade	Himesh Reshammiya	Samyak Prasana	4:49	5 August 2023
164	Tu Hi Manzil	Himesh Reshammiya	Rajashri Bag	4:14	7 August 2023
165	Aaj Kasamh Se	Himesh Reshammiya	Arun Dev Yadav	4:43	8 August 2023
166	Jiyaa Laage Naa	Himesh Reshammiya	Mona Bhatt	4:44	9 August 2023
167	Tumse Pyaara Koi Nahi	Himesh Reshammiya	Chetna Bhardwaj	4:40	10 August 2023
168	Doorr Nahi Jaana Re	Himesh Reshammiya	Soyab Ali	4:50	12 August 2023
169	Aan Milo Sajnaa	Himesh Reshammiya	Nihal Tauro	4:51	14 August 2023
170	Dil Ko Lage Apnaa	Himesh Reshammiya	Sireesh Bhagavatula	4:15	15 August 2023
171	Pyarr Jhukta Nahi	Himesh Reshammiya	Mohammad Danish	4:22	16 August 2023
172	Beqarrarr Dil Mera	Himesh Reshammiya	Srishti Bhandari	4:07	17 August 2023
173	Tune Kya Kiya	Himesh Reshammiya	Vraj Kshatriya	4:46	18 August 2023
174	Tumhari Baatein Karnaa	Himesh Reshammiya	Kavya Limaye	3:23	19 August 2023
175	Dil Se	Himesh Reshammiya	Snigdhajit Bhowmik	3:32	21 August 2023
176	Tuu Jo Saath Ho	Himesh Reshammiya	Neelanjana Ray	4:16	22 August 2023
177	Dil Tere Naam Ki	Himesh Reshammiya	Navdeep Wadali	4:55	23 August 2023
178	Deedaar	Himesh Reshammiya	Sunny Hindustani	4:35	25 August 2023
179	Poocho Mere Dil Se	Himesh Reshammiya	Salman Ali	4:43	28 August 2023
180	Mausam Hua Beganna	Himesh Reshammiya	Ankona Mukherjee	4:52	29 August 2023
181	Tu Mujhko Kya Samjehgi	Himesh Reshammiya	Shivam Singh	4:47	30 August 2023
182	Terri Yaadonn Se Junior	Himesh Reshammiya	Mani Dharamkot	3:59	1 September 2023
183	Ankhiyon Ke Jharokhon Se	Himesh Reshammiya	Sayli Kamble	4:13	4 September 2023
184	Bandhann	Himesh Reshammiya	Amarjeet Jaikar	4:54	5 September 2023
185	Teraa Interzaar	Himesh Reshammiya	Rupam Bharnarhia	4:33	9 September 2023
186	Tu Hai Meri Zindagi	Himesh Reshammiya	Rajashri Bag	4:33	11 September 2023
187	Ishaare	Himesh Reshammiya	Ankona Mukherjee	4:51	12 September 2023
188	Teri Aarzoo	Himesh Reshammiya	Sachin Valmiki	4:41	13 September 2023
189	Tere Dumm Se	Himesh Reshammiya	Dipayan Banerjee	4:45	14 September 2023
190	Terii Judaai	Himesh Reshammiya	Sawai Bhatt	4:46	18 September 2023
191	Dhadkan	Himesh Reshammiya	Neelanjana Ray	4:09	20 September 2023
192	Maujood Hai Junior	Himesh Reshammiya	Mani Dharamkot	4:44	21 September 2023
193	Love	Manish S. Shukla	Mohammad Faiz	4:31	25 September 2023
194	Chehra	Himesh Reshammiya	Vraj Kshatriya	4:53	26 September 2023
195	Dekha Tujhe	Himesh Reshammiya	Ankona Mukherjee	4:48	27 September 2023
196	Mere Piyaa Ki Fitratt	Himesh Reshammiya	Neelanjana Ray	4:17	29 September 2023
197	Khushboo	Himesh Reshammiya	Rajashri Bag	4:22	2 October 2023
198	Pehli Baar Mein	Himesh Reshammiya	Rupam Bharnarhia	4:11	5 October 2023
199	Aashiqui Ne Maarraa (LoFi Mix)	Shabbir Ahmed	Mohammed Irfan	3:21	6 October 2023
200	Mausam Kii Tarah 2.0	Himesh Reshammiya	Tushar Arjun	2:58	11 October 2023
201	Tere Naam Ki Choodiyaan	Himesh Reshammiya	Shibani Kashap	4:54	12 October 2023
202	Dil Se 2.0	Himesh Reshammiya	Amarjeet Jaikar	3:32	13 October 2023
203	O Mere Jaaniya	Himesh Reshammiya	Neelanjana Ray	4:50	16 October 2023
204		Himesh Reshammiya			
205		Himesh Reshammiya			
206	Tune Kya Kiya 2.0	Himesh Reshammiya	Karthik Kumar Krishnamurthy	4:46	18 October 2023
207	Raanjhna	Himesh Reshammiya	Sharad Sharma	4:03	19 October 2023
208	Tumpe Mar Jaaenge (LoFi Mix)	Himesh Reshammiya	Palak Muchhal	4:15	23 October 2023
209	Ae Jaane Jaahaan	Himesh Reshammiya	Shivam Singh	4:42	25 October 2023
210	Mera Dil Meri Jaan	Himesh Reshammiya	Albert Lepcha	4:14	26 October 2023
211	Dil Tere Binna	Himesh Reshammiya	Neelanjana Ray	4:51	30 October 2023
212	Tera Ehsaas	Himesh Reshammiya	Ankush Bhardwaj	4:55	31 October 2023
213	Adhoore Khwaab	Himesh Reshammiya	Sneha Shanker	4:38	1 November 2023
214	Saawan Mein	Himesh Reshammiya	Chetna Bhardwaj	4:00	2 November 2023
215	Love	Manish S. Shukla	Albert Lepcha	4:30	6 November 2023
216	Tujhe Paanaa Hai	Himesh Reshammiya	Vipin Aneja	4:22	7 November 2023
217	Choodiyaan Khanke	Himesh Reshammiya	Ankush Bhardwaj, Sneha Shankar	4:31	8 November 2023
218	Ishk Ye Ghazab Ka	Himesh Reshammiya	Biswajit Mahapatra	4:39	22 November 2023
219	Sannson Mein Tum Ho	Himesh Reshammiya	Nachiket Lele	4:43	23 November 2023
220	Tera Chale Jaana	Himesh Reshammiya	Sonakshi Kar	4:42	24 November 2023
221	Har Justajoo	Himesh Reshammiya	Tabish Ali and Sneha Shankar	4:45	29 November 2023
222	Jabb Se Tumko Dekhaa 2.0	Sameer Anjaan	Vejayalakshmi Puli	4:33	30 November 2023
223	Dil Ki Surzameen	Himesh Reshammiya	Abdul Shaikh	4:44	6 December 2023
224	Pehle Ka Naata	Himesh Reshammiya	Ankush Bhardwaj	4:37	7 December 2023
225	Tumhein Meri Kasam	Himesh Reshammiya	Sunny Hindustani	4:15	11 December 2023
226	Bheeg Le Ishk Mein	Himesh Reshammiya	Ranita Banerjee	4:08	14 December 2023
227	Meri Choodi Khanke	Himesh Reshammiya	Rajashri Bag	3:58	18 December 2023
228	O Mere Saahiba	Himesh Reshammiya	Keshav Anand	4:48	23 December 2023
229	Lamha Mera	Himesh Reshammiya	Salman Ali	4:23	8 January 2024
230	Ehsaas Bheege Bheege	Himesh Reshammiya	Keshav Anand	3:34	16 January 2024
231	Jaadoo Kare Teri Adaa	Himesh Reshammiya	Nihal Tauro	4:39	24 January 2024
232	Teri Aankhein Kehti Hai Kya	Himesh Reshammiya	Sanchari Sengupta	4:38	5 February 2024
233	Teri Amaanat	Himesh Reshammiya	Vraj Kshatriya	3:36	7 February 2024
234	Jab Se Tumko Dekha (LoFi Mix)	Sameer Anjaan	Stebin Ben	4:05	8 February 2024
235	Teri Aashiqui Kaa Saawan	Himesh Reshammiya	Ankona Mukherjee	4:26	12 February 2024
236	Bheegi Ye Baarish	Himesh Reshammiya	Sana Arora	3:56	14 February 2024
237	Dagaa (LoFi Mix)	Sameer Anjaan	Mohd Danish	5:08	16 February 2024
238	Janam Janam Ka Saath Apna	Himesh Reshammiya	Sayli Kamble	4:49	19 February 2024
239	Nainon Kaa Toofaan	Himesh Reshammiya	Nitinn Kumar	3:52	21 February 2024
240	O Sajnaa (Lofi Mix)	Himesh Reshammiya	Sawai Bhatt	5:42	23 February 2024
241	Koi Pooche Mere Dil Se	Himesh Reshammiya	Amarjeet Jaikar	4:11	26 February 2024
242	Joda Ek Rishta	Himesh Reshammiya	Rik Basu	3:44	28 February 2024
243	Duaa Mein Yaad Rakhhna (Lofi Mix)	Himesh Reshammiya	Aditya Narayan	5:20	1 March 2024
244	Vaada Bhool Na Jaana	Himesh Reshammiya	Snigdhajit Bhowmik	4:34	4 March 2024
245	Mera Mehboob	Himesh Reshammiya	Sneha Shankar	4:03	7 March 2024
246	Naam Teraa	Himesh Reshammiya	Neelanjana Ray	3:22	11 March 2024
247	Maujood Hai (Lofi Mix)	Himesh Reshammiya	Sawai Bhatt	5:01	18 March 2024
248	Nasha De Gaya	Himesh Reshammiya	Chetna Bhardwaj	4:45	22 March 2024
249	Prem Kahaani Mein	Himesh Reshammiya	Senjuti Das	4:28	1 April 2024

== Music video ==
All songs were released in studio version and were shot at the HR Musik Studio and the singers themselves featured in the music videos alongside instrumentalists also appear in the music videos.
