= Hathangaon =

Coordinates: 28°06′N 77°00′E

- Village
- Location in Haryana, India Hathangaon (India)
- Country: India
- State: Haryana
- District: Nuh district
- Municipality: Punhana
- Postal code: 122508
- ISO 3166 code: IN-HR
- Website: haryana.gov.in

Hathangaon is a village in tehsil Punhana in Nuh district of Haryana in India. This village is located 12 km from Punhana.

== Nearby villages ==
- Nai
- Neheda
- Naugaon
- Bichor
- Aminabad
- Samshabad

== Demographics ==
As of 2011 India census, Hathangaon had a population of 3706 in 537 households. Males (1956) constitute 52.7% of the population and females (1750) 47.23%. Hathangaon has an average literacy (1585) rate of 42.76%, less than the national average of 74%: male literacy (1065) is 67.19%, and female literacy (520) is 32.8%. In Hathangaon, 19.77% of the population is under 6 years of age (733).

↓
1956	1750
Male	Female
