= Happy Hardy and Heer =

2020 Indian film by Raka

- Theatrical release poster
- Directed by: Raka
- Written by: Sonia Kapoor
- Story by: Himesh Reshammiya
- Produced by: Deepshikha Deshmukh; Sabita Manakchand
- Starring: Himesh Reshammiya; Sonia Mann
- Cinematography: Chandan Kowli
- Edited by: Deepak Chandra
- Music by: Himesh Reshammiya
- Production companies: EYKA Films; HR Musik Limited
- Distributed by: Tips Industries
- Release date: 31 January 2020
- Running time: 123 minutes
- Country: India
- Language: Hindi

Happy Hardy and Heer is a 2020 Indian Hindi-language musical romantic drama film directed by Raka, produced by Deepshikha Deshmukh and Sabita Manakchand, starring Himesh Reshammiya in a double role and Sonia Mann.

== Plot ==
Happy, a lovable loser, is in love with his childhood friend Heer. Although she is fond of him, she has not expressed romantic feelings toward him. When Heer moves to London, Happy follows her. While he claims to be seeking employment, his true intention is to win her affection. In London, Heer meets Hardy, who was born and raised there. Whereas Happy appears as a carefree man who repeatedly fails in his endeavors, Hardy is a successful entrepreneur. Heer becomes attracted to Hardy, and a twist in the story places her in a position where she must choose between her childhood friend and her ideal partner.

== Cast ==
- Himesh Reshammiya as Harpreet Singh Lamba ("Happy") and Harshvardhan Bhatt ("Hardy")
- Sonia Mann as Heer Randhawa
- Naresh Suri as Heer's father
- Manmeet Singh as Happy's maternal uncle
- Deep Mandeep
- Ashwin Dhar as Mr. Kapoor (married to Hardy's mother)
- Trupti Khamkar as Latika
- David Shaw as Charles

== Production ==
=== Filming ===
The film was shot in places such as Glasgow, Edinburgh and Greenock of Scotland and were filmed from 15 April 2019 to 15 May 2019.

=== Promotion ===
The makers of the film took a different approach to promote the film, deciding to organize Happy Hardy Heer concerts in 12 different cities. On 16 November 2019, the first concert was organized in Pune.

=== Release ===
On 16 July 2019, a musical teaser of the film was released. The film was released on 31 January 2020.

== Soundtrack ==
Happy Hardy and Heer

Soundtrack album by Himesh Reshammiya
- Released: 2020
- Recorded: 2020
- Venue: Mumbai
- Studio: HR Musik Limited
- Genre: Feature film soundtrack
- Length: 52:28
- Label: Tips Music
- Producer: Himesh Reshammiya

Himesh Reshammiya chronology
Genius (2018)	Happy Hardy and Heer (2020)	Radhe (2021)

Singles from Happy Hardy and Heer
- 1. "Heeriye" Released: 23 July 2019; 2. "Cutiepie" Released: 31 July 2019; 3. "Heer Tu Meri" Released: 7 August 2019; 4. "Ishqbaaziyaan" Released: 16 August 2019; 5. "Looteri" Released: 23 August 2019; 6. "Teri Meri Kahani" Released: 11 September 2019; 7. "Aashiqui Mein Teri 2.0" Released: 14 November 2019; 8. "Duggi" Released: 11 January 2020; 9. "Le Jaana" Released: 17 January 2020; 10. "Aadat" Released: 20 January 2020; 11. "Keh Rahi Hai Nazdeekiyan" Released: 5 February 2020

The soundtrack was composed by Reshammiya, with lyrics by Vishal Mishra, Kumaar, Shabbir Ahmed, Reshammiya and Aaryan Tiwari. The soundtrack will consist of songs sung by Reshammiya, Arijit Singh, Shreya Ghoshal, Jubin Nautiyal, Harshdeep Kaur, Asees Kaur, Navraj Hans, Anusha Mani, Ranu Mondal and Rituraj Mohanty. The first song of the album "Heeriye" was released on Reshammiya's birthday on 23 July 2019. The song "Teri Meri Kahani" was released on 11 September 2019. Aashiqui Mein Teri 2.0 is the remake of Aashiqui Mein Teri from 36 China Town originally composed and recreated by Reshammiya. For the song "Duggi", Reshammiya collaborated with Shannon K, an American singer-songwriter, daughter of singer Kumar Sanu, who also marked her debut as playback singer in Bollywood.

=== Track listing ===
No.	Title	Lyrics	Singer(s)	Length
1.	"Heeriye"	Vishal Mishra	Arijit Singh, Shreya Ghoshal (Backing Vocals: Rituraj Mohanty, Aishwarya Majmudar, Salman Shaikh, Anudutt Shamain)	5:31
2.	"Cutie Pie"	Shabbir Ahmed	Himesh Reshammiya	3:28
3.	"Heer Tu Meri"	Himesh Reshammiya	Himesh Reshammiya, Anusha Mani	4:35
4.	"Ishqbaaziyaan"	Shabbir Ahmed	Jubin Nautiyal, Harshdeep Kaur, Asees Kaur, Alamgir Khan	4:23
5.	"Looteri"	Himesh Reshammiya, Aaryan Tiwari	Aaryan Tiwari	2:32
6.	"Teri Meri Kahani"	Shabbir Ahamed	Himesh Reshammiya, Ranu Mondal	4:55
7.	"Aashiqui Mein Teri 2.0"	Sameer, Himesh Reshammiya	Himesh Reshammiya, Ranu Mondal	5:16
8.	"Duggi"	Himesh Reshammiya	Himesh Reshammiya, Navraj Hans, Shannon K, Raja Sagoo	3:05
9.	"Le Jaana"	Kumaar	Himesh Reshammiya, Navraj Hans, Harshdeep Kaur, Asees Kaur	5:16
10.	"Aadat"	Sonia Kapoor	Himesh Reshammiya, Asees Kaur, Rabbi Shergill, Ranu Mondal	6:01
11.	"Keh Rahi Hai Naazdeekiyaan"	Shabbir Ahamed	Himesh Reshammiya, Udit Narayan, Ranu Mondal, Payal Dev, Sameer Khan	7:46
Total length:				52:28

=== Soundtrack Response ===
The soundtrack was successful. "Teri Meri Kahani" went viral and was viewed over 23 million types on YouTube. "Teri Meri Kahani" became the second most searched song and most searched Hindi song on Google in 2019.

== Reception ==
=== Critical reception ===
Harshada Rege from Times of India gave it 3/5 and called it "Music makes this love triangle an entertaining watch." Sonil Dedhia from Mid-Day gave 3/5 and stated "Happy Hardy and Heer is a harmless, watchable film – sad, because it could have been better. It has its moments in the first half, while the second looks a bit dragged. With well- crafted romantic and intense moments, the film is a breezy love story." The Economic Times gave it 3/5 and stated "an amusing watch despite wafer-thin plot & weak screenplay."

Conversely, Nandini Ramnath from Scroll.in gave it 2/5 and stated "There is barely anything new in the situations between Heer and the two men in love with her. Besides, both the leads look a bit too seasoned to be playing the love-at-first-sight game. Despite the high volume at which the dialogue is delivered – Reshammiya is subtlety itself compared to Sonia Mann – almost nothing resonates." Moumita Bhattacharjee of Rediff.com gave the film 1 out of 5, calling it "an extended music video."

=== Box office ===
The film collected ₹5 million (US$52,000) on its opening day.
