= Punahana =

Punhana Punhana
- Location in Haryana, India Punhana (India)
- Coordinates: 27°51′50″N 77°12′20″E
- Country: India
- State: Haryana

Government
  - Type: Haryana Government
  - Body: Municipal Committee of Punhana
  - MLA: Mohammed Ilyas (INC)
- Elevation: 187 m (614 ft)

Population (2011)
  - Total: 24,734

Languages
  - Official: Hindi, English
  - Spoken: Mewati
- Time zone: UTC+5:30 (IST)
- PIN: 122508
- ISO 3166 code: IN-HR
- Vehicle registration: HR93
- Website: mewat.gov.in

Punhana is a town in the Nuh district in the Indian state of Haryana. It is also the origin place of Chaudhary Rahim Khan. It lies within the National Capital Region as well as the Braj region of India.

== Geography ==
Punahana is the largest town of the Nuh district, at an average elevation of 187 metres (613 feet).

== Demographics ==
As of 2011 census, Punahana had a population of 13,178. Males constitute 52% of the population and females 48%. Punahana has an average literacy rate of 53%, lower than the national average of 59.5%: male literacy is 63% and female literacy is 41%. In Punahana, 21% of the population is under 6 years of age. The district has a low population when compared to the population density of India.

== Villages ==
- Akbarpur
- Allahabad
- Aminabad
- Andhaki,
- Badli
- Bandhauli
- Barka
- Basdalla
- Bhuriaki
- Bichhor
- Bikti
- Bisru
- Chandanki
- Dadauli
- Ferozepur Meo
- Gabanspur
- Gangwani
- Ghira
- Gubradi
- Gudhala
- Gudhauli
- Gulalta
- Hajipur
- Hathangaon
- Hinganpur
- Indana
- Jakh
- Jakhokhar
- Jalika
- Jamal Garh
- Jarauli
- Jehtana
- Jharokri
- Jaiwant
- Karaira Punahana
- Khajli Kalan
- Khajli Khurd
- Kherla Punahana
- Kherliter
- Khorishah Chokha
- Laherwari
- Laphuri
- Lohinga Kalan
- Mamlika
- Manota
- Mhuziaba
- Mohammadpur Ter
- Mubarikpur
- Mundheta
- Naharpur
- Naheda
- Nai
- Nakanpur
- Nangla Jamalgarh
- Nasirpuri
- Neemka
- Niwana
- Otha
- Paima Khera
- Papra
- Papri
- Patakpur
- Punahana
- Phalaindi
- Phardari
- Pinagwan
- Qutabpur
- Rahepwa
- Raipur
- Rajpur
- Rasoolpur,
- Ronota
- Runera
- Satakpuri
- Shamsabad Khechatan
- Shamshabad Khurd
- Shikrawa
- Sihri
- Singar
- Siroli
- Srisingalheri
- Sultanpur-Punahana
- Sumahra
- Teekri
- Ter
- Thek
- Tirwara
- Tundlaka
- Tusaini

== Nearby towns ==
- Pinangwan
- Ferozepur Jhirka
- Hodal
- Nuh
- Hathin
