= Sameer Anjaan =

Indian lyricist

Sameer Anjan
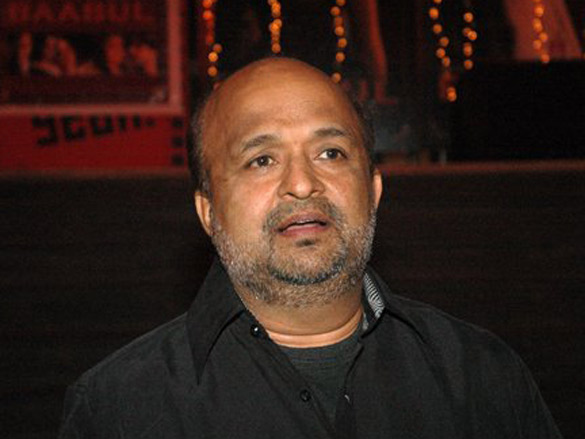
- Sameer Anjaan in 2006
- Born: Shitala Pandey; Varanasi, Uttar Pradesh, India
- Occupation: Lyricist
- Years active: 1983–present
- Spouse: Anita Pandey
- Children: 3
- Father: Lalji Pandey

Shitala Pandey, better known as Sameer or Sameer Anjaan, is an Indian lyricist, known for writing songs predominantly for Bollywood films. Having composed over 3,500 songs, he was recognized by Guinness World Records as the most prolific Bollywood lyricist in 2015. He has won three Filmfare Awards.

== Biography ==
Sameer, officially named Shitala Pandey, but commonly known by his nickname Rajan, was born near Banaras, Uttar Pradesh. He earned a Master of Commerce degree at the Banaras Hindu University in Varanasi, and started a new position as a bank officer at the Central Bank of India. However, a few days after joining, he left the job because he "knew the bank was not my world". To pursue a career as a lyricist, he moved to Mumbai in 1987.

== Career ==
Sameer started his career as a lyricist in 1983 with the film Bekhabar (1983). The first film song he recorded was "Maar Ke Kataaree Mar Jaibe" for the Bhojpuri film Bairi Saawan (1984) sung by Suresh Wadkar and Preeti Sagar. In 1990, he came into prominence with songs in films such as Dil and Aashiqui. He won his first Filmfare Award in the year 1991 for the song "Nazar Ke Saamne" in the latter. In the following decades he wrote the lyrics for over 4,000 songs in more than 500 films.

According to Sameer, his inspirations have been lyricists Majrooh Sultanpuri, Anand Bakshi, and his father, Anjaan. He has often said, "Whatever I am today is only because of my father."

Sameer won two additional Filmfare Awards in 1993 and 1994; one for the song "Teri Umeed Tera Intezaar" from the movie Deewana, and the second for the song "Ghunghat Ki Aad" from Hum Hain Rahi Pyar Ke. In 1998, he won Zee Cine Award for "Kuch Kuch Hota Hai" from Kuch Kuch Hota Hai. Some of his most successful songs include songs in films like Beta, Saajan, Raja Babu, Coolie No. 1, Raja Hindustani, Anjaam, Kuch Kuch Hota Hai, Fiza, Dhadkan, Kabhi Khushi Kabhie Gham, Devdas, Raaz, Dil Hai Tumhaara, Ishq Vishk, Dil Maange More, Tere Naam, Asambhav, Fida, No Entry, Aksar, Dhoom 2, Saawariya, Race, Damadamm!, Housefull 2, Rowdy Rathore, Son of Sardaar, Dabangg 2, Balmaa, and more.

== Personal life ==
Sameer's father, Lalji "Anjaan" Pandey, also a well known Hindi lyricist.

Sameer is married to Anita Pandey and the couple have three children: daughters Sanchita and Suchita, and son Siddhesh. His mother, Indira Pandey, lived with them.

A biography, Sameer – A Way with Words by Derek Bose, was released by Amitabh Bachchan in 2007.

== Filmography as lyricist ==
Due to Sameer's large number of works, this is an incomplete list.

=== Albums ===
Year	Album	Artist	Notes
2002	Tera Chehra	Adnan Sami	All songs
2004	Kabhi Aisa Lagta Hai	Lucky Ali	
2006	Aap Kaa Surroor	Himesh Reshammiya	All songs
2021	Moods with Melodies	Music by Himesh Reshammiya, sung by Various artists	Tere Bagairr
2021	Himesh Ke Dil Se	Music by Himesh Reshammiya, sung by Various artists	Dagaa, Agar Tumm Na Hote, Jab Se Tumko Dekha
2021	Super Sitaara	Music by Himesh Reshammiya, sung by Kumar Sanu, Alka Yagnik	Humnava Humsafar

== Awards and nominations ==
Year	Category	Song/nomination	Result
Filmfare Awards
2008	Best Lyrics	"Jab Se Tere Naina" – Saawariya	Nominated
2006	Best Lyrics	"Aashiq Banaya Aapne" – Aashiq Banaya Aapne	Nominated
2004	Best Lyrics	"Tere Naam"– Tere Naam	Won
2004	Best Lyrics	"Kissi Se Tum pyar Karo" – Andaaz	Nominated
2003	Best Lyrics	"Aapke Pyaar Mein"– Raaz	Nominated
2002	Best Lyrics	"Kabhi Khushi Kabhi Gham" – Kabhi Khushi Kabhie Gham	Nominated
2001	Best Lyrics	"Tum Dil Ki Dhadkan Mein" – Dhadkan	Nominated
1999	Best Lyrics	"Kuch Kuch Hota Hai" – Kuch Kuch Hota Hai	Nominated
1999	Best Lyrics	"Ladki Badi Anjaani Hai" – Kuch Kuch Hota Hai	Nominated
1997	Best Lyrics	"Pardesi Pardesi" – Raja Hindustani	Nominated
1995	Best Lyrics	"Ole Ole" – Yeh Dillagi	Nominated
1994	Best Lyrics	"Ghungat Ki Aad Se" – Hum Hain Rahi Pyar Ke	Won
1993	Best Lyrics	"Teri Umeed Tera Intezar" – Deewana	Won
1993	Best Lyrics	"Aisi Deewangi" – Deewana	Nominated
1992	Best Lyrics	"Mera Dil Bhi" – Saajan	Nominated
1991	Best Lyrics	"Nazar Ke Saamne" – Aashiqui	Won
1991	Best Lyrics	"Mujhe Neend Na Aaye" – Dil	Nominated
IIFA Awards
2009	Best Lyrics	"Pehli Nazar Mein" –Race	Nominated
2008	Best Lyrics	"Jab Se Tere Naina" – Saawariya	Nominated
2007	Best Lyrics	"Crazy Kiya Re" – Dhoom 2	Nominated
2006	Best Lyrics	"Aashiq Banaya Apne"– Aashiq Banaya Apne	Nominated
2005	Best Lyrics	"Woh Tassvur Ka Aalam" – Aitraaz	Nominated
2004	Best Lyrics	"Kyun Kisi Ko" – Tere Naam	Nominated
2004	Best Lyrics	"Main Yahan Tu Wahan" – Baghban	Nominated
2002	Best Lyrics	"Kabhi Khushi Kabhi Gham" – Kabhi Khushi Kabhie Gham	Nominated
2001	Best Lyrics	"Dil Ne Ye Kaha Hai" – Dhadkan	Nominated
2001	Best Lyrics	Tum Dil Ki Dhadkan Me – Dhadkan	Nominated
Screen Awards
2013	Best Lyrics	"Dagabaaz Re" – Dabangg 2	Nominated
2001	Best Lyrics	"Dil Ne Ye Kaha Hai" – Dhadkan	Nominated
Zee Cine Awards
2011	Best Lyrics	"Mora Piya" – Rajneeti	Nominated
2005	Best LyricS	"Woh Tassvur Ka Aalam" – Aitraaz	Nominated
1999	Best Lyrics	"Kuch Kuch Hota Hai" – Kuch Kuch Hota Hai	Won
Apsara Film & Television Producers Guild Awards
2011	Best Lyrics	"Mora Piya" – Rajneeti	Nominated
Mirchi Music Awards
2012	Lyricist of The Year	"Dagabaaz Re" - Dabangg 2	Nominated
