= Sonia Kapoor =

Indian actress on television and film

- Occupation: Actress
- Years active: 1993–present
- Spouse: Himesh Reshammiya (m. 2018)

Sonia Kapoor is an Indian television and film actress who has appeared in many television series and Bollywood films.

She married Bollywood actor, singer, music director Himesh Reshammiya on 11 May 2018 in a private ceremony in Mumbai.

== Television ==
- Khauff on Sony SAB (Episode 5 & Episode 6)
- Kahiin To Hoga as Ritika
- Sanjivani as Madhu
- Maa Shakti as Goddess Ganga in Hinduism
- Yes Boss as Meera Srivastava 2007
- Ishq Ki Ghanti 2006
- Kittie Party as Ruksana
- Aa Gale Lag Jaa as Priti
- 2005 Piya Ka Ghar as Shweta Avinash Sharma
- Kabhie Kabhie as Neelu Nigam
- 2002 Kkusum as Naina Bajaj
- Captain House DD Metro as Sonia
- Shikawa on DD National
- Kabhi Haan Kabhi Kabhi Naa as Avantika
- Sati...Satya Ki Shakti as Sanika
- Zaara as Zaara
- Remix as Sonia Ray 2006
- Parrivaar as Sangamitra Shergill
- Suraag – The Clue as Sushma, Anupama Vivek Malhotra, Manisha Ramesh Khandelwal, and Jackal Alias Madam Shaina Alias Rajni
- Kaisa Ye Pyar Hai as Naina Khanna
- Babul Ki Duwayen Leti Jaa as Preeti
- Jugni Chali Jalandhar as Manjeet Bhalla
- Neeli Aankhen as Neelu Nigam
- Krishnaben Khakhrawala as Mitali Kapoor
- Love U Zindagi as Mitali Kapoor
- 1999 : Jai Ganesha(Zee TV) as Goddess Lakshmi
- 1997 - 2000 Jai Hanuman as Mandodari
- Heena as Nameera
- Shri Krishna as Subhadra
- Karma – Koi Aa Rahaa Hai Waqt Badalney as Gayatri
- Shagun as Anjali
- Kumkum – Ek Pyara Sa Bandhan as Inspector Revati
- Neeli Aankhen as Neha Oberoi
- 2001 Woh Koun Thi as Rani Devyani (Episode 14)
- Dushman
- Hatim tv series Maliaka E Husn 2004

== Filmography ==
Year	Film	Role
1996	Ishtamanu Nooru Vattam	Geethu Narendran
2001	Officer	Pratap Rai's servant
2003	Satta	
2005	Fareb	Sonia Sharma
2008	Don Muthu Swami	Guleri
2015	Karbonn	
2016	Teraa Surroor	Costume designer and stylist
2020	It's My Life	Rama Sharma
2020	Happy Hardy and Heer	Screenplay, lyricist (Aadat), costume designer and stylist

=== Lyricist ===
Year	Film / Album	Song
2020	Happy Hardy and Heer	"Aadat"
2021	Himesh Ke Dil Se	"Bas Tum Mere Paas Raho"
2023	Himesh Ke Dil Se	"Paayyaliaa"
2023	Himesh Ke Dil Se	"Achcha Hota"
2023	Bad Boy	"Tera Hua"
2025	Badass Ravi Kumar	"Butterfly Titliyan"
2026	Yeh Prem Mol Liya	"Jhumka Patola"
2026	Gunmaaster G9	"Dard-E-Dil Dard-E-Jigar"
