= Himesh Reshammiya =

Indian music director and actor (born 1973)

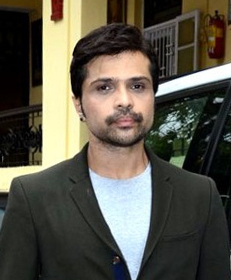
- Himesh Reshammiya in 2014.

Background information
- Born: 23 July 1973 (age 53)
- Origin: Mumbai, Maharashtra, India
- Genres: Disco; Pop Music; Rock Music; Bollywood; Electronic Dance Music; Bhajan
- Occupations: Music director; lyricist; composer; playback singer; songwriter; actor; writer; film producer; music producer; television personality
- Instruments: vocals; tabla; dholak; electric guitar; bass guitar; drum set; bongos; harmonium; piano; violin; saxophone
- Years active: 1998–present
- Labels: T-Series; Tips Music; Sony Music; Sony BMG; Saregama; HR Musik Limited (defunct); Himesh Reshammiya Melodies (Youtube Channel); Zee Music Company
- Spouses: Komal Reshammiya (m. 1995; div. 2017); Sonia Kapoor (m. 2018)

YouTube information
- Channel: Himesh Reshammiya Melodies
- Years active: 2020–present
- Genre: Hindi songs
- Subscribers: 10.4 million
- Views: 5.13 billion
- Last updated: 10 July 2026

Himesh Reshammiya (born 23 July 1973) is an Indian playback singer, music director, songwriter, producer and actor, with over 1,300 credited songs. He started his career as a music director in the film Pyaar Kiya To Darna Kya in 1998 and made his acting debut with the film Aap Kaa Surroor in 2007.

In August 2025, Reshammiya was ranked #22 in the Bloomberg's World's Most Influential Pop-stars list and was the only Indian artist to feature on the list.

== Personal life ==
Himesh Reshammiya was born in Mumbai, Maharashtra, India, to Vipin Reshammiya, an Indian music composer, and Madhu Reshammiya, on 23 July 1973. At the age of 21, Reshammiya married Komal and they share a son. On 12 September 2016, it was reported that Reshammiya and Komal mutually filed for divorce. On 11 May 2018, Reshammiya married actress Sonia Kapoor. His father died on 18 September 2024 at the age of 87.

== Music and film career ==
=== Early career (1998–2002) ===
Reshammiya began producing TV series such as Andaz, Ahha, Aman, Aashiqui, Amar Prem and Jaan on Zee TV. He also composed title tracks for some of these shows. Reshammiya's father was supposed to make a film with Salman Khan in the 1990s, but this did not take place; when Khan heard one of Reshammiya's compositions, he was impressed and promised to let him compose music for one of his films. In 1998, Reshammiya made his debut as a music composer with the Salman Khan film Pyaar Kiya To Darna Kya, composing two songs for the project: "Pyaar Kiya To Darna Kya" and "Tum Par Hum Hai Aatke". Both songs became hits.

He went on to compose music for Bandhan and Hello Brother, together with other composers. His first movie as a solo composer was another Salman Khan production, Dulhan Hum Le Jayenge. Reshammiya gained some prominence when he composed music for Humraaz and Yeh Hai Jalwa. This earned him a nomination for Filmfare Award for Best Music Direction.

=== 2003–2010 ===
Reshammiya gained more prominence when he composed songs for another Salman Khan film, Tere Naam (2003), for which he won several accolades, including the Zee Cine Award for Best Music Director and Screen Award for Best Music Director. In 2004, he wrote music for ten films, among them Aitraaz and Dil Maange More. In 2005, he worked on ten more films, including Aashiq Banaya Aapne and Maine Pyaar Kyun Kiya?.

At this point, he also began working as a playback singer with the song "Aashiq Banaya Aapne", which earned him numerous awards, including Filmfare Award for Best Male Playback Singer, IIFA Award for Best Male Playback, and Zee Cine Award for Best Male Playback Singer.

As a singer, Reshammiya has recorded multiple popular songs, such as "Aashiq Banaya Aapne", "Tera Suroor", "Zara Jhoom Jhoom", "Jhalak Dikhlaja", "Andaz Apna Apna", "Afsana", "Shakalaka Boom Boom", "Meri Awaargi", "Hookah Bar", "Chalao Na Naino Se", "Tandoori Nights", "Dil Ke Taj Mahal Mein" and "Saaz". His music has a style of composition based on a fusion of Western and Indian rock music, accompanied by techno beats.

The studio album Aap Kaa Surroor, released in 2006, sold 1.3 million units and was the seventh highest-selling album of the year.

Reshammiya has also worked as an actor, beginning with the film Aap Kaa Surroor. In 2006, during the early promotion of Aap Kaa Surroor, Himesh Reshammiya reused the song “Tanhaiyyan,” which had been composed during sessions for Milenge Milenge but was not included in the final soundtrack of that film. Initially, Reshammiya had composed the song for Kapoor's film, but later decided to use it for his own movie. Tips, which held the audio rights of Milenge Milenge, accused Reshammiya of copyright violation, as audio rights for "Aap Kaa Surroor – The Real Luv Story" were acquired by T-Series. However, Reshammiya defended himself, saying that he had made Kapoor listen to the song, but it was not included in Milenge Milenge. He also claimed to have tried to get in touch with Kapoor for seven months, and since there was no progress on the film, he decided to use the song for his own movie.

Following the success in music, Reshammiya performed at various arenas worldwide with large shows and packed audiences. He was the first Indian singer to perform at Wembley Arena in London and the Heineken music hall in Amsterdam.

Reshammiya was actively involved in mentoring and judging the singing competition Sa Re Ga Ma Pa Challenge on Zee TV. His group was known as Jai Mata Di Let's Rock Gharana. He was the winning mentor of the show in 2007. In 2009, Vaishali Mhade, a female contestant from his Jai Mata Di Let's Rock Gharana group, won the singing competition. He is also the team captain, judge, and mentor on Star Plus's show Music Ka Maha Muqqabla for the team Himesh's Warriors. Reshammiya was also the judge of the musical reality show Sur Kshetra, which was telecasted on Sahara One. He appeared as the special guest in the Grand Finale of Jo Jeeta Wohi Superstar 2, where he also trained the top four contestants.

=== 2011–2020 ===
On 4 November 2013, it was announced that Reshammiya would be acting in and producing a movie named The Xposé.

In April 2019, it was confirmed that Reshammiya would be back onscreen with the film Namastey Rome, which is a sequel to Namastey London and Namastey England. He also collaborated with lyricist Javed Akhtar in the film's soundtrack, as they had worked together on Namastey London. Reshammiya also acted in three other projects, one being a sequel of The Xposé, named The Xposé Returns. Reshammiya also confirmed that he would make a biopic about the soldier Bishnu Shrestha; the film would be based on his involvement in the Maurya Express train robbery.

=== 2021–present ===
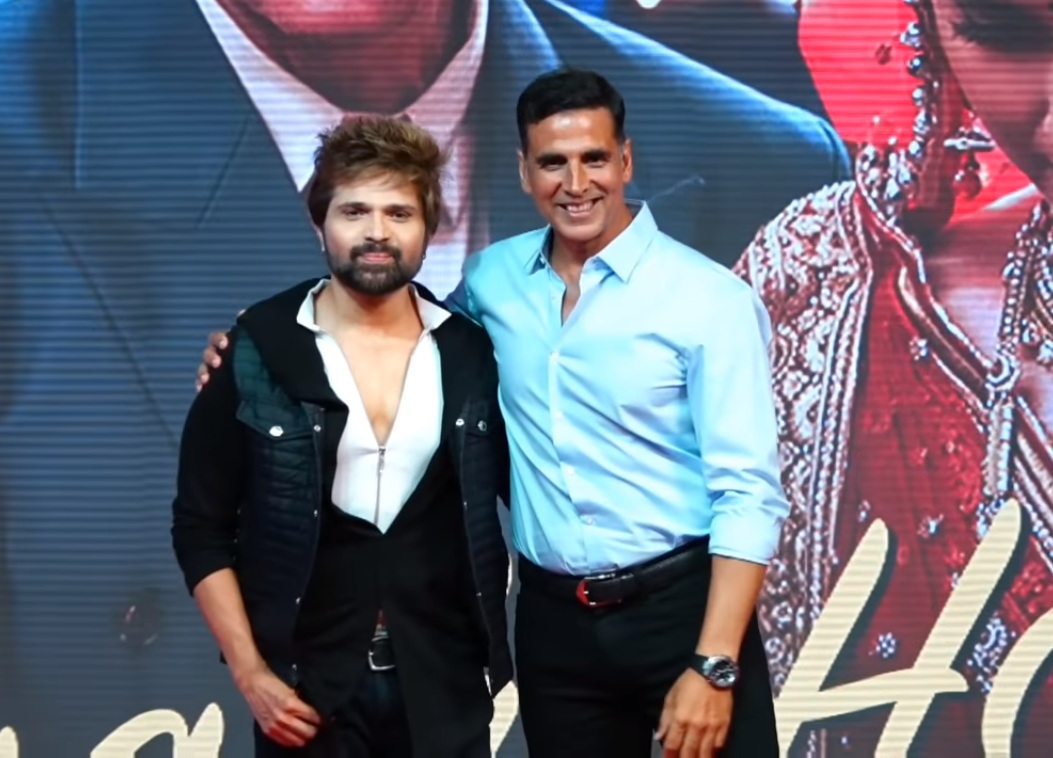
Reshammiya with Akshay Kumar during the song launch event of the film Raksha Bandhan (2022)

On 5 June 2021, Reshammiya launched his music label Himesh Reshammiya Melodies and announced his upcoming studio album Surroor 2021, the second album of the Surroor franchise to be released after 2006. The title track of the album "Surroor Tera" was released on 11 June 2021, which followed by the announcement of two new albums under the label Himesh Reshammiya Melodies, namely Moods with Melodies and Himesh Ke Dil Se. Later in August, Reshammiya announced another album Super Sitaara, which will feature singers from 90's era like Kumar Sanu, Alka Yagnik and lyricist Sameer. Surroor 2021 garnered more than 6 billion views across YouTube and more than 1.5 billion audio streams on various platforms. In 2022, he composed all of the songs for Anand L. Rai's film Raksha Bandhan, collaborating with Akshay Kumar after ten years since Khiladi 786. Reshammiya announced his upcoming movie Badass Ravi Kumar in November 2022, which is a spinoff of The Xposé. Badass Ravi Kumar is the 11th movie of Reshammiya in lead role.

=== Cap Mania Tours ===
In April 2025, Reshammiya announced the "Cap Mania Tour" in various cities across India, with initial shows scheduled for Mumbai, Maharashtra, and Delhi on 31 May and 19 July, respectively. Another show was added on 20 July in Delhi, which also sold out. After that, a few more tours in Ahmedabad on 13 December 2025, in Dubai on 21 December 2025, in Pune on 31 January 2026, in Ludhiana on 14 February 2026, and in Kolkata on 1 March 2026, were also announced.

=== Music videos ===
In May 2026, he featured in a music video named "Sharab" with Manushi Chillar. The song was sung by Reshammiya himself, while it was composed by Rajat Nagpal, lyrics were penned by Rana Sotal, and directed and choreographed by Piyush-Shazia.

== Awards and nominations ==
Reshammiya won the Filmfare Award for Best Male Playback Singer in 2006 for Aashiq Banaya Aapne, as well as receiving several other awards such as the Star Screen Award, IIFA Award, and the Zee Cine Award. He also received several nominations for his music direction. Reshammiya additionally won a BIG Star Entertainment Award as best music director for Prem Ratan Dhan Payo.
