= Emraan Hashmi filmography =

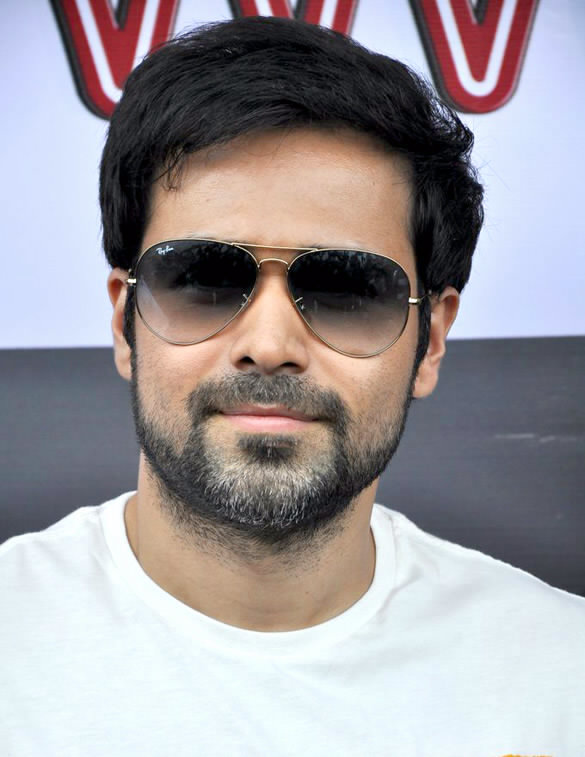
Hashmi in 2012

Emraan Hashmi is an Indian actor who works in Hindi films. He debuted in Footpath (2003), and went on to star in Murder (2004), Tumsa Nahin Dekha (2004), Zeher (2005), Aashiq Banaya Aapne (2005) and Gangster (2006). However, this followed with roles in films that underperformed at the box office before starring in the acclaimed drama Awarapan (2007).

The year 2008 marked a turning point for Hashmi, when he played a conman in the crime drama Jannat. He subsequently gained recognition for portraying a range of unconventional characters in the horror film Raaz: The Mystery Continues (2009), the biographical drama The Dirty Picture (2011), the psychological thriller Murder 2 (2011), the romantic comedy Dil Toh Baccha Hai Ji (2011), the crime thriller Jannat 2 (2012), and the supernatural thrillers Raaz 3 (2012) and Ek Thi Daayan (2013), all of which earned him critical appreciation. Hashmi's acclaimed performances in the underworld drama Once Upon a Time in Mumbaai (2010) and the political thriller Shanghai (2012), garnered him two Best Supporting Actor nominations at Filmfare. After appearing in another series of box office flops, he starred as the titular character in the biographical sports drama Azhar and an evil spirit in the horror thriller Raaz Reboot (both 2016) – and received praise for the drama Hamari Adhuri Kahani (2015), and Baadshaho (2017).

In 2021, he acted in the mystery thriller, Chehre, directed by Rumi Jaffery. In 2021, he was seen in Sanjay Gupta's action crime film Mumbai Saga opposite John Abraham and in the supernatural horror film Dybbuk. In 2023, he featured in the comedy-drama film Selfiee and played in the antagonist in YRF's Tiger 3.

== Film ==
Key
†	Denotes films that have not yet been released

Year	Title	Role	Notes
2003	Footpath	Rahul / Raghu Srivastav	
2004	Murder	Sunny Devaa	
2004	Tumsa Nahin Dekha	Daksh Mittal	
2005	Zeher	Siddharth Mehra	
2005	Aashiq Banaya Aapne	Vikram "Vicky" Mathur	
2005	Chocolate	Deva	
2005	Kalyug	Ali Bilal "Ali Bhai"	
2006	Jawani Diwani	Mannjit "Mann" Kapoor	
2006	Aksar	Ricky Sharma	
2006	Gangster	Akash Kapadia	
2006	The Killer	Nikhil Joshi	
2006	Dil Diya Hai	Sahil Khanna	
2007	Good Boy, Bad Boy	Rajveer "Raju" Malhotra	
2007	The Train	Vishal Dixit	
2007	Awarapan	Shivam Pandit	
2008	Jannat	Arjun Dixit	
2009	Raaz: The Mystery Continues	Prithvi Singh	
2009	Tum Mile	Akshay "Akki" Malvade	
2010	Once Upon a Time in Mumbaai	Shoaib Khan	
2010	Crook	Jai Dixit / Suraj Bhardwaj	
2011	Dil Toh Baccha Hai Ji	Abhay Suri	
2011	Murder 2	Arjun Bhagawat	
2011	The Dirty Picture	Abraham	
2012	Jannat 2	Sonu Dilli "KKC – Kutti Kameeni Cheez"	
2012	Shanghai	Joginder Parmar	
2012	Raaz 3	Aditya Arora	
2012	Rush	Samar Grover	
2013	Ek Thi Daayan	Bejoy Charan Mathur (Bobo)	
2013	Ghanchakkar	Sanjay "Sanju" Athray	
2014	Raja Natwarlal	Mithilesh Kumar Srivastava / "Raja Natwarlal "	
2014	Ungli	Nikhil Abhyankar	
2015	Mr. X	Raghu Ram Rathod / Mr. X	
2015	Hamari Adhuri Kahani	Aarav Ruparel	
2016	Azhar	Mohammad Azharuddin	
2016	Raaz: Reboot	Aditya Srivastava	
2017	Baadshaho	Dalia	
2018	Tigers	Ayaan	
2019	Why Cheat India	Rakesh Kumar Singh (Rocky)	
2019	The Body	Ajay Puri	
2020	55	Sagar Bhai	
2021	Mumbai Saga	Vijay Savarkar	
2021	Chehre	Sameer Mehra	
2021	Dybbuk	Sam Isaac	
2023	Selfiee	RTO Inspector Om Prakash Agarwal	
2023	Tiger 3	Aatish Rehman	
2024	Ae Watan Mere Watan	Ram Manohar Lohia	Cameo appearance
2025	Ground Zero	BSF Deputy Commandant Narendra Nath Dhar Dubey	
2025	They Call Him OG	Omkar Vardhaman Mirajkar "Omi Bhau"	Telugu film
2025	Haq	Adv. Mohammad Abbas Khan	
2026	Awarapan 2	Shivam Pandit	
2026	Gunmaaster G9 †	Eshwar / Agent G9	
2027	Rooh †	TBA	
2027	G2 †	TBA	Telugu film; filming

== Television ==
Key
†	Denotes television productions that have not yet been released

Year	Title	Role	Notes
2019	Bard of Blood	Prof. Kabir Anand (Agent Adonis)	Netflix series
2024	Showtime	Raghu Khanna	Disney+Hotstar series
2025	The Ba***ds of Bollywood	Himself	Netflix series
2026	Taskaree	Arjun Meena	Netflix series

== Music videos ==
Year	Title	Role	Artist	Label	Ref.
2015	"Main Raahon Yaa Na Raahon"	David	Armaan Malik, Amaal Malik	T-Series	
2021	"Lut Gaye"	Vijay Dandekar	Jubin Nautiyal, Tanishk Bagchi	T-Series	
2022	"Ishq Nahi Karte"	Raj	B Praak, Jaani	DRJ Records	
