= Red Chillies Entertainment =

Indian entertainment company

Red Chillies Entertainment Private Limited
- Type: Private Limited Company
- Industry: Entertainment Conglomerate
- Predecessor: Dreamz Unlimited
- Founded: 2002
- Founder: Shah Rukh Khan; Gauri Khan
- Headquarters: Mumbai, Maharashtra, India
- Area served: Worldwide
- Key people: Shah Rukh Khan (Founder and MD); Gauri Khan (Co-Founder, Producer and Joint-MD); Venky Mysore (CEO); Aashish Singh (COO); Pradeep Nimani (CFO)
- Services: Production; Distribution
- Owner: Shah Rukh Khan; Gauri Khan
- Number of employees: 500–1,000
- Divisions: Film Production; Film Distribution; Television; TV Commercials; Professional Sports Leagues Organisation; Marketing; Licensing; Merchandising; Brand Partnerships; VFX; Color Grading; Digital Imaging Technician; Motion Control; Post-Production
- Subsidiaries: KidZania India; Red Chillies VFX; Red Chillies Colour; Red Chillies Motion Control; Red Chillies DIT; Red Chillies TVC; Knight Riders Group; Red Chillies Primetime Live TV & Movies
- Website: Red Chillies Entertainment

Red Chillies Entertainment Private Limited, doing business as Red Chillies Entertainment (abbreviated as RCE), is an Indian multinational entertainment conglomerate established by actor Shah Rukh Khan and his wife Gauri Khan in 2002. It evolved from the defunct production company Dreamz Unlimited. Based in Mumbai, its activities span creative development, production, marketing, distribution, licensing, merchandising and syndication of films in India and worldwide.

The company also operates a major visual effects division, Red Chillies VFX. Its businesses include film production, film distribution, TV and web series production, TV commercial production, visual effects, professional sports league organization, edutainment and more. Red Chillies has also acquired rights to several Hindi films over the years.

Red Chillies Entertainment owns a 26% stake in ImagiNation Edutainment India Pvt Ltd, which runs KidZania India.

The company also runs a dedicated TV commercials division, Red Chillies TVC.

Shah Rukh Khan serves as founder and managing director (MD), while Gauri Khan is co-founder and joint MD. Venky Mysore, who is also the CEO of the Kolkata Knight Riders, took over as CEO of Red Chillies Entertainment in 2013.

In January 2024, Gaurav Verma left the company after nine years, and in May 2024, Aashish Singh was appointed as the company's new COO and Co-Producer.

== History ==
=== 2002–2004 ===
Red Chillies Entertainment was founded in 2002 by husband and wife Shah Rukh Khan and Gauri Khan. It was launched as a film production company as well as film distributor and visual effects company. It has its roots in Dreamz Unlimited, a defunct film production company that was owned by Khan, Juhi Chawla, and Aziz Mirza. Red Chillies Entertainment launched its visual effects studio Red Chillies VFX in 2006.

In 2008, Red Chillies Entertainment formed a sporting subsidiary alliance with the Mehta Group and established its the sporting subsidiary Knight Riders Group, holding a 55 percent stake in the group. The Knight Riders Group owns the Indian Premier League cricket team Kolkata Knight Riders (2008), the Trinbago Knight Riders (2015) cricket team of Caribbean Premier League, the Trinbago Knight Riders Women's (2022) cricket team of Women's Caribbean Premier League, the Abu Dhabi Knight Riders (2022) cricket team of International League T20 and the Los Angeles Knight Riders (2020) cricket team of Major League Cricket.

In 2015, RCE started a Color Grading studio known as Red Chillies Color. In 2018, RCE started a Motion Control studio known as Red Chillies Motion Control. In 2018, RCE started a Digital Imaging Technician(DIT) studio known as Red Chillies DIT.

=== 2004–2010 ===
The production house released Main Hoon Na in 2004, which did well at the box office, becoming the second highest-grossing film of the year. Khan also starred in the company's 2nd release, the 2005 movie Paheli, belonging to genre of Indian Parallel Cinema, the film was critically acclaimed and was selected as India's official entry to the 78th Academy Awards in the Best Foreign Language Film category.

The third film produced by the company was Farah Khan's mega-budget Om Shanti Om, which was released in November 2007. The film was set in the 1970s and 2000s and paid tribute to the Indian film industry of both these eras. Upon release, it broke many box office records, grossing over ₹ 1.49 billion, and thus became the highest-grossing Hindi film of all time at the time of its release. The 2009 film Billu starring Irrfan Khan and Lara Dutta was the company's next release, the film opened to good reviews, but was a failure at the box office. The film made by Roshan Abbas, Always Kabhi Kabhi, did poorly.

=== 2010–present ===
The company continued working on other projects until finally deciding on Ra.One (2011) starring Khan himself, Kareena Kapoor and Arjun Rampal. The pre-production work began in 2007 after the release of Om Shanti Om. The film's crew consisted of more than 5,000 members from India, Italy, and the US, and was pieced together by more than 1,000 people, working in shifts, in around 15 studios across the world. It saw the inclusion of several visual effects techniques being incorporated in the production which were carried out by Red Chillies VFX. With an estimated budget of ₹ 1.25 billion, Ra.One was the second-most expensive film ever produced in Indian cinema and the most expensive Bollywood film. The film witnessed a level of publicity campaigning previously unseen in India films, with marketing taking place over nine months and involving major brand tie-ups of a 52 crore (US$9.88 million) which set the record for the largest marketing budget in India. Shah Rukh Khan decided to dedicate Ra. One to his friend and former CEO Sanjiv Chawla, since he stepped down due to ill health.

The film released across 3,100 screens in India and 904 prints overseas in both 2D and 3D, making it the largest Indian cinematic release in the world. The film went on to earn ₹ 204 crores worldwide, but against the movie's big budget and the huge sum of money spent on marketing it, the movie underperformed and was a commercial disaster. Their next production was Karan Johar's directorial venture, Student of the Year (2012), which was co-produced by Johar's production company. The company is reportedly targeting a 25 percent annual business growth and is set to roll out four to five films, but the Bollywood superstar says he won't act in them.

"We want to make four to five films without me. As a producer I would like to concentrate on the films and visual effects," Shah Rukh told IANS in an interview.

Badla (2019) was one such film that didn't star Shah Rukh Khan. It featured Amitabh Bachchan and Taapsee Pannu in lead roles and was directed by Sujoy Ghosh. It is a mystery thriller that was produced by Warner Bros. Pictures, Red Chillies Entertainment, and Azure Entertainment, in which businesswoman Naina Sethi (Pannu) hires lawyer Badal Gupta (Bachchan) to clear her name as a suspect in the murder of her lover.

The production house launched its first collaboration with Netflix India, Bard of Blood, in 2019. Based on the 2015 novel of the same name, this espionage thriller starred Emraan Hashmi in the lead role along with Kirti Kulhari, Vineet Kumar Singh, Jaideep Ahlawat and Sobhita Dhulipala. It is a seven-episode series that revolves around the story of an ex-RAW agent. The series premiered on 27 September 2019 on Netflix.

Kaamyaab co-produced with Drishyam Films starring Sanjay Mishra and Deepak Dobriyal was released on 6 March 2020.

Their film, Bob Biswas, in association with Sujoy Ghosh's Bound Script Production is currently on floors. Starring Abhishek Bachchan in the lead, the movie is the directorial debut of Diya Annapurna Ghosh. The film is based on a fictional character from Kaahani (2012), 'Bob Biswas', who is a poker-faced contract killer.

== Filmography ==
Key
†	Denotes films that have not yet been released

Year	Film	Director	Producer(s)	Distributor(s)	Notes	Ref
2000	Phir Bhi Dil Hai Hindustani	Aziz Mirza	Shah Rukh Khan, Juhi Chawla, Aziz Mirza		Produced under Dreamz Unlimited	
2001	Aśoka	Santosh Sivan	Shah Rukh Khan, Juhi Chawla		Produced under Dreamz Unlimited and Arclightz & Films, Won 1 Filmfare Award, Won 2 IIFA Awards	
2003	Chalte Chalte	Aziz Mirza	Shah Rukh Khan, Juhi Chawla, Aziz Mirza	UTV Motion Pictures	Produced under Dreamz Unlimited	
2004	Main Hoon Na	Farah Khan	Gauri Khan	Eros International	The studio's first release as Red Chillies Entertainment, Won a Filmfare Award	
2005	Kaal	Soham Shah	Shah Rukh Khan, Karan Johar	Yash Raj Films	Co-produced with Dharma Productions	
2005	Paheli	Amol Palekar	Gauri Khan		India's official entry to the 78th Academy Awards for Best Foreign Language Film; National Film Award for Best Female Playback Singer	
2005	The Outer World of Shah Rukh Khan	Nasreen Munni Kabir	Gauri Khan	Eros International	Produced under Red Chillies International, Direct-to-video	
2007	Om Shanti Om	Farah Khan	Gauri Khan	Eros International	National Film Award for Best Art Direction, Won 2 Filmfare Awards	
2009	Billu Barber	Priyadarshan	Gauri Khan	Eros International		
2010	My Name Is Khan	Karan Johar	Hiroo Yash Johar, Gauri Khan	Fox Searchlight Pictures (US), Fox Star Studios (India), 20th Century Fox (International)	Co-produced with Dharma Productions and Fox Star Studios	
2011	Men Will Be Men	Gorky	Samar Khan	PVR Pictures	Produced under Red Chillies Idiot Box	
2011	Always Kabhi Kabhi	Roshan Abbas	Gauri Khan	Eros International		
2011	Ra.One	Anubhav Sinha	Gauri Khan	Eros International	National Film Award for Best Special Effects, Won a Filmfare Award	
2011	Don 2	Farhan Akhtar	Farhan Akhtar, Ritesh Sidhwani, Shah Rukh Khan	Reliance Entertainment	Co-produced by Excel Entertainment and Red Chillies Entertainment	
2012	Student of the Year	Karan Johar	Hiroo Yash Johar, Gauri Khan	AA Films (India), Eros International (International)	Co-produced with Dharma Productions	
2013	Chennai Express	Rohit Shetty	Gauri Khan, Ronnie Screwvala, Siddharth Roy Kapur	UTV Motion Pictures	Co-produced with UTV Motion Pictures, Won 1 Filmfare Award, Won 3 IIFA Awards, Won 4 Zee Cine Awards, Won 5 Screen Awards	
2014	Happy New Year	Farah Khan	Gauri Khan	Yash Raj Films	Won 4 Stardust Awards, Won 3 Screen Awards	
2015	Dilwale	Rohit Shetty	Gauri Khan, Rohit Shetty		Co-produced with Rohit Shetty Productions, Won 2 Screen Awards	
2016	Dear Zindagi	Gauri Shinde	Gauri Khan, Karan Johar, R Balki	NH Studioz	Co-produced with Dharma Productions and Hope Productions	
2017	Raees	Rahul Dholakia	Gauri Khan, Farhan Akhtar, Ritesh Sidhwani	AA Films	Co-produced with Excel Entertainment	
2017	Jab Harry Met Sejal	Imtiaz Ali	Gauri Khan, Imtiaz Ali	NH Studioz, Yash Raj Films		
2017	Ittefaq	Abhay Chopra	Gauri Khan, Karan Johar, Abhay Chopra	AA Films, Yash Raj Films	Co-produced with Dharma Productions and B.R. Studios	
2018	Zero	Aanand L Rai	Gauri Khan, Aanand L Rai	Pen Marudhar Cine Entertainment, Yash Raj Films	Co-produced with Colour Yellow Productions, Won 1 Filmfare Award, Won 2 Zee Cine Awards	
2019	Badla	Sujoy Ghosh	Gauri Khan, Sunir Kheterpal, Akshai Puri	Pen Marudhar Cine Entertainment	Co-produced with Azure Entertainment	
2020	Kaamyaab	Hardik Mehta	Gauri Khan, Manish Mundra, Gaurav Verma	Pen Marudhar Cine Entertainment	Co-produced with Drishyam Films	
2020	Class of '83	Atul Sabharwal	Gauri Khan, Gaurav Verma	Netflix	Netflix Original Film	
2021	Bob Biswas	Diya Annapurna Ghosh	Gauri Khan, Sujoy Ghosh, Gaurav Verma	ZEE5	Co-produced with Bound Script Production	
2022	Love Hostel	Shanker Raman	Gauri Khan, Manish Mundra, Gaurav Verma	ZEE5	Co-produced with Drishyam Films	
2022	Darlings	Jasmeet K Reen	Alia Bhatt, Gauri Khan, Gaurav Verma	Netflix	Co-produced with Eternal Sunshine Productions	
2023	Jawan	Atlee	Gauri Khan, Gaurav Verma	Pen Marudhar Entertainment, Yash Raj Films		
2023	Dunki	Rajkumar Hirani	Gauri Khan, Rajkumar Hirani, Gaurav Verma	Pen Marudhar Entertainment, Yash Raj Films	Co-produced with Rajkumar Hirani Films and Jio Studios	
2024	Bhakshak	Pulkit	Gauri Khan, Gaurav Verma	Netflix		
2025	The Ba***ds of Bollywood	Aryan Khan	Gauri Khan	Netflix	Web Series	
2026	Kartavya	Pulkit	Gauri Khan	Netflix		
2026	King †	Siddharth Anand	Gauri Khan, Siddharth Anand, Mamta Anand	Pen Marudhar, Yash Raj Films	Co-produced with Marflix Pictures	

== RC.VFX ==
Red Chillies Entertainment Pvt. Ltd. has a visual effects studio headed by Haresh Hingorani and Keitan Yadav; known as redchillies.vfx which started in 2006. Apart from home productions, the VFX team had been involved with movies like Chak De! India, Krrish 3, Don: The Chase Begins Again, Dostana and De Dana Dan. Some of the major awards won by the team:

- In 2006, Don: The Chase Begins won European accolades for Best Special Effects.
- In 2007, Om Shanti Om won best visual effects from Filmfare, Zee cine, IIFA, Star Screen, Indy's and Apsara Producer's Guild Awards.
- In 2011, Ra.One swept all major awards in Bollywood for visual effects, including a National Film Award and Filmfare Award for Best Special Effects and was nominated for the Asian Film Award as well. The division has the largest manpower among the group companies with a staff strength of over 130.
- In 2016, Fan won best special effects award from Filmfare.
- In 2018, Zero won best visual effects award from Filmfare and Zee Cine.
- In 2023, Jawan won the best visual effects award from Filmfare.

== RC.COLOR ==
In 2015, Red Chillies Entertainment started a color grading studio known as redChillies.color. It is a color grading division that provides color grading and end-to-end post-production services for feature films, series, and news media.

== Television ==
An extended five-episode miniseries version of Aśoka aired on Star Plus from 28 May 2002 to 25 June 2002.

A TV production arm Red Chillies Idiot Box was launched in 2009. The unit produced 10 shows, 2 Television films and 1 Theatrical film Men Will Be Men before it was shut down in 2012.

In 2017 it was announced that Red Chillies Entertainment will produce Bard of Blood, an eight-episode series for Netflix based on the novel The Bard of Blood by Bilal Siddiqi. The series premiered on 27 September 2019.

A horror mini-series Betaal premiered on 24 May 2020 on Netflix.

== Sports ==
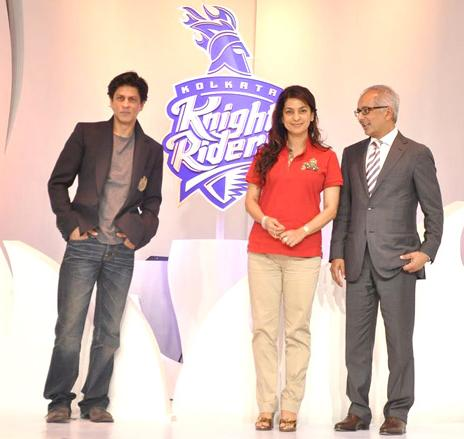
(L-R)Shahrukh Khan, Juhi Chawla and Jay Mehta co-owners of KKR.

In 2008, Red Chillies acquired ownership rights for the franchise representing Kolkata in the Twenty20 cricket tournament Indian Premier League, for a price of US$75.09 million, and have since named the team Kolkata Knight Riders. KKR is the richest team in the IPL and it has been ranked as the most valued with a brand value of $42.1 million. Financially, KKR is the most profitable franchise in the IPL. The home of the Kolkata Knight Riders is Eden Gardens.

In 2011, they introduced the Mumbai franchise in the motorsport racing league i1 Super Series. In 2012, SRK showed his interest to buy a 50& share of Dempo S.C. Indian football club of I League. He also has a 50% stake in the Caribbean Premier League franchise Trinidad and Tobago Red Steel from 2015 onwards. The team had many popular former players and the current coach of Kolkata Knight Riders, Jacques Kallis and other well-known players like Kamran Akmal, Dwayne Bravo, Johan Botha, Darren Bravo and Cameron Delport, etc.

The team clinched their maiden Caribbean Premier League title in 2015, right after Shahrukh Khan became the owner of the franchise. He changed the name and logo of the team the very next season to Trinbago Knight Riders, with the name and the logo being almost identical to KKR.

In 2022, Knight Riders Group (KRG) acquires Abu Dhabi Knight Riders (ADKR) franchise in UAE International League T20. KRG had also acquired a franchise in Cricket South Africa's T20 Global League, but the league was eventually scrapped and replaced with Mzansi Super League due to the absence of the board to secure a broadcasting deal. Other Indian Premier League Franchises have followed KRG's path and have franchises in T20 Leagues outside India, or have shown interest for the same. In 2022, KRG announced the construction of a 10,000-seater stadium in Los Angeles, in partnership with Major League Cricket, for their franchise (Los Angeles Knight Riders) and is designated as the venue for 2028 Summer Olympics being the sole stadium in Los Angeles, other than the inferior Leo Magnus Cricket Complex.
