= The Vainglorious =

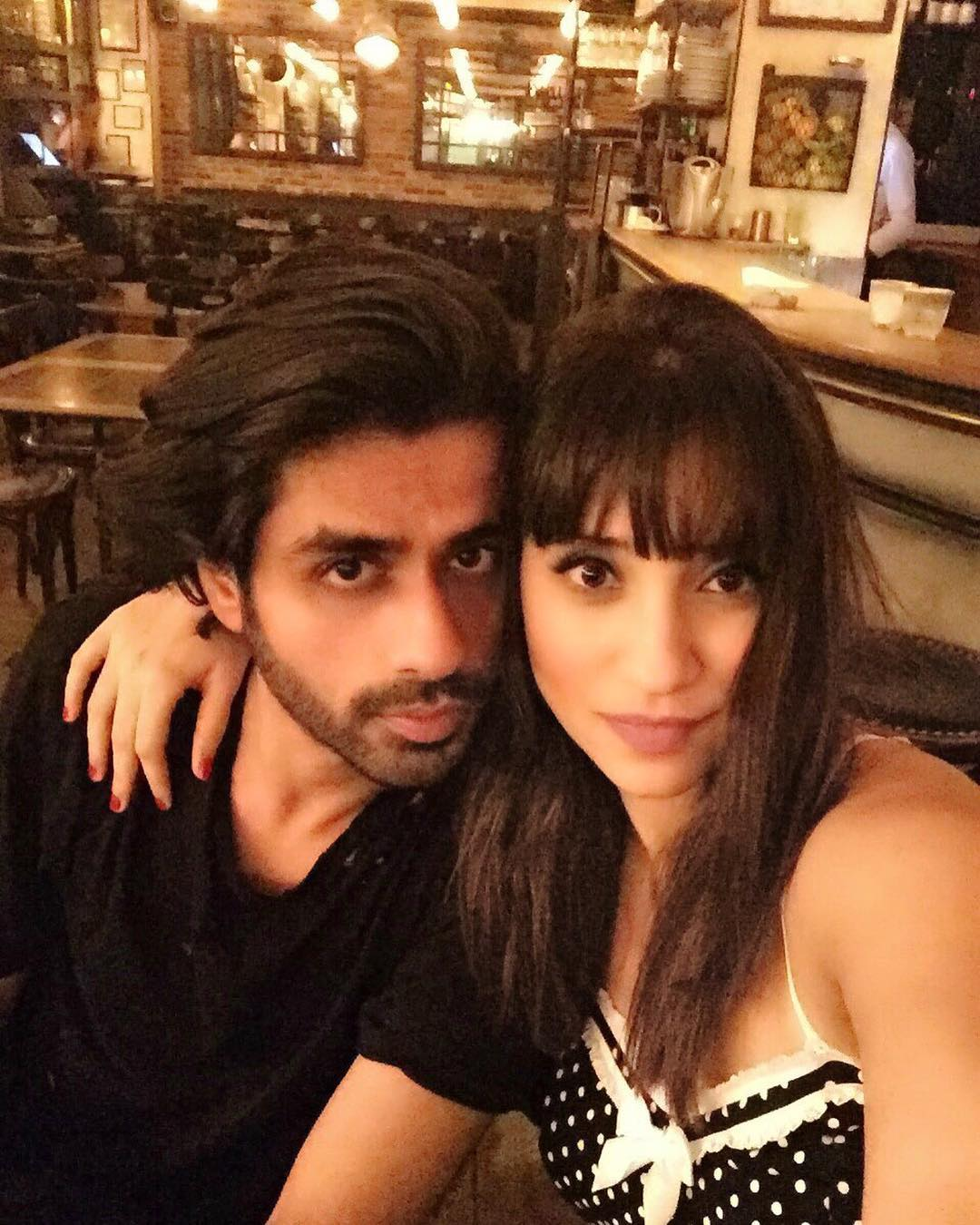
- Born: Mumbai, India
- Occupation: Stylists
- Years active: 2014 – present

The Vainglorious are the professional name of two Mumbai-based Bollywood stylists, Priyanka Shahani and Kazim Delhiwala.

The duo have worked as stylists to several Indian actors, including Ranbir Kapoor, Sushant Singh Rajput, Aditya Roy Kapur, Imran Khan, Emraan Hashmi, Tiger Shroff, and most recently Varun Dhawan

Shahani's educational background is in psychology and Delhiwala is a trained pilot. They have been working in fashion since 2014, when they were employed by Emraan Hashmi for the promotions of Ungli. Their most recent work is for Ranbir Kapoor for the promotions of Jagga Jasoos.
