= Ashish Singh =

Ashish Singh may refer to:

- Ashish Singh (cricketer), Indian cricketer
- Ashish Kumar Singh, Indian politician

== See also ==
- Aashish Singh, Indian film producer
