= Bilal Siddiqi =

Indian author and screenwriter (born 1994)

- Siddiqi (left) with The Ba***ds of Bollywood co-writer and co-creator, Manav Chauhan (right) at the 7th Screenwriters Association Awards, May 2026.
- Born: 15 August 1994 (age 32)
- Education: St. Xavier's College, Mumbai
- Occupations: Author; screenwriter
- Writing career
- Years active: 2015– Present
- Genre: Thriller
- Notable works: The Bard of Blood, The Ba***ds of Bollywood and Awarapan 2

Bilal Siddiqi (pronunciation: [bɪˈlaːl sɪdːiːqi:]; born 15 August 1994) is an Indian author and screenwriter in Hindi cinema, known for his debut novel, The Bard of Blood, and co-writing The Ba***ds of Bollywood and Awarapan 2.

== Early life and background ==
Siddiqi was born on 15 August 1994. His father, Mansoor, is a marketing professional, his mother, Farhat, used to be an ad professional and his sister, Zayna, is a molecular biologist. He graduated from St. Xavier's College, Mumbai with a bachelor's degree in mass media in 2015.

Around the time Siddiqi was 17 years old, his interest piqued in espionage.

== Career ==
In 2014, during his college, Siddiqi interned at Indian cricket franchise, Kolkata Knight Riders, writing their official blog. He later on worked in the marketing department of Red Chillies Entertainment; during this time, with inputs and feedback from renowned actor and RCE co-founder and MD, Shah Rukh Khan, he and his colleagues at RCE would go on to pitch his debut novel, The Bard of Blood, to Netflix.

=== Writing career ===
Siddiqi's first book was The Bard of Blood (2015), a novel that he wrote when he was 19 years old. At his college, he met author, S. Hussain Zaidi—whom he considers his mentor—while Zaidi was looking for volunteers to assist him in research for his the then-upcoming book, Mumbai Avengers (2015), among whom Siddiqi had been shortlisted.

Zaidi, whom Siddiqi had been assisting for the past three years as of April 2015, asked for the synopsis of the then-untitled spy thriller set in Balochistan that latter had been writing and forwarded the same to a publishing house, Penguin Books India. Through, Zaidi, Siddiqi met Chiki Sarkar, the then-chief editor of Penguin Books India, who decided to commission the book after reading the manuscript.

“The reason why I chose the militant backdrop is very close to my heart. Being a Muslim, I wanted to understand why I was so different from these ‘Jihadis’, when ideally, we both were supposed to believe in the same set of principles. It was in fact the entire talk about jihad and Islamic extremism that plagued every newspaper that pushed me towards exploring this subject more.”

Isheeta Sharma of DU Beat (an independent student newspaper of Delhi University), in her book review, concluded, "The book is well researched and written in a way that combines fact and fiction together to create a story worth reading."

Later, he co-wrote a memoir, The Kiss of Life: How a Superhero and My Son Defeated Cancer (2016) with Emraan Hashmi, about Hashmi's son's fight against cancer.

A critic at Bollywood Hungama gave the book 4 stars out of 5, calling it, "Brilliant!"

Merril Anil of The Times of India summed up, "The book, in general, turned out to be very hard-hitting and an emotional supplement."

His next book was, The Stardust Affair (2017), loosely based on the life of actress, Mamta Kulkarni, whose rights for film adaptation were acquired by Nikhil Dwivedi in 2020.

Ishaan of Deccan Chronicle noted in his book review, "In Mumbai, the land of celluloid dreams, anything is possible. And it is this quality of imagination that the author, Bilal Siddiqui [sic], exploits to the hilt in his novella." He called the book, "[...] a page-turner that screams conspiracy from the word go." He also noted at the end of his book review, "The author reposes immense faith in his reader’s imagination to make this potboiler seem plausible."

=== Screenwriting career ===
Siddiqi co-created and co-wrote Ba***ds of Bollywood (2025) with Aryan Khan and Manav Chauhan. He co-wrote screenplay and dialogues for Awarapan 2 (2026).

== Filmography ==
=== Films ===
Year	Title	Screenplay	Dialogues	Notes	Ref.
2025	The Mehta Boys	—N/a	—N/a	Assistant director	
2026	Awarapan 2	Yes	Yes	co-written with Vishesh Bhatt and Nitin Kakkar.	

=== Television ===
Year	Title	Writer	Creator	Notes	Ref.
2019	Bard of Blood	Yes	Yes	Based on his novel, The Bard of Blood	
2025	The Ba***ds of Bollywood	Yes	Yes		

== Bibliography ==
- Siddiqi, Bilal (15 March 2015). The Bard of Blood. Penguin Books. ISBN 9788184750324.
- Hashmi, Emraan; Siddiqi, Bilal (11 April 2016). The Kiss of Life: How a Superhero and My Son Defeated Cancer. Penguin Books. ISBN 9789385890925.
- Siddiqi, Bilal (15 September 2017). The Stardust Affair. Penguin Random House India. ISBN 9789386815750.
- Siddiqi, Bilal (7 September 2020). The Phoenix. Penguin Random House India. ISBN 9789353059538.

== Awards and nominations ==
Year	Award	Category	Work	Result	Notes	Ref.
2026	Iconic Gold Awards	Best Writer	The Ba***ds of Bollywood	Won	Shared with Aryan Khan and Manav Chauhan	
2026	Critics' Choice Awards	Best Writing	The Ba***ds of Bollywood	Nominated	Shared with Aryan Khan and Manav Chauhan	
2026	Screenwriters Association Awards	Best Screenplay	The Ba***ds of Bollywood	Won	Shared with Aryan Khan and Manav Chauhan	
2026	Screenwriters Association Awards	Best Story	The Ba***ds of Bollywood	Nominated	Shared with Aryan Khan and Manav Chauhan	
