= Rachel White (actress) =

Indian actress and artist

- Born: Rachel White; Kolkata, India
- Occupation: Actress

Rachel White is an Indian actress and singer-songwriter who works in Hindi and Bengali films. She has appeared in the Bollywood film Ungli (2014); and Bengali films Har Har Byomkesh (2015), Devi (2017) and One (2017).

== Early life ==
Born in Kolkata, India, she completed her schooling from Loreto Convent School, Kolkata and later graduated with a degree in English (Honours) from the University of Calcutta.

== Career ==
In 2014, Rachel White debuted in Bollywood with Emraan Hashmi, Sanjay Dutt, Kangana Ranaut and Neha Dhupia in the film Ungli where she was cast opposite Emraan Hashmi. She appeared in the Bengali films Har Har Byomkesh (2015), Devi (2017) and One (2017). White has modeled for brands such as Pond's, Garnier, MRF Tyres, Axis Bank, Airtel, Kotak Mahindra, ICICI Bank. White replaced Sonali Raut in the sitcom web series Love, Life and Screw Ups, starring Zeenat Aman, Zarina Wahab, Dolly Thakore and Sushant Divgikar. Rachel collaborated with a USA based fashion brand Yog The Label selling her pictures featured products manufactured in USA and Europe worldwide.

== MeToo activism ==
On 12 October 2018, White accused film director Sajid Khan of sexual harassment as part of the MeToo movement in Bollywood. These allegations surfaced after actress Saloni Chopra and journalist Karishma Upadhyay also opened up about her experience with Khan's behavior which led Khan to step down from directing the film Housefull 4 and being suspended from the Indian Film and Television Directors Association (IFTDA) for a year due to multiple sexual harassment allegations.

== Filmography ==
Key
†	Denotes films that have not yet been released

Year	Title	Role	Language	Notes
2011	Mankatha	Herself	Tamil	
2014	Ungli	Herself	Hindi	
2015	Har Har Byomkesh	Chandni	Bengali	
2016	Saadey CM Saab	Herself	Punjabi	
2017	Love, Life and Screw Ups	Kashish	Hindi	
2017	Devi	Shaon	Bengali	
2017	One	Bipasha	Bengali	
2017	Jihad	Christina	Hindi	
2019	Bhobishyoter Bhoot	Singer	Bengali	
2019	Thai Curry	Naira	Bengali	

== Web series ==
Year	Series	OTT	Character
2015	Aahat	SET India	Anamika
2018-2019	Mismatch	Hoichoi	Sukanya
2020	Mismatch Season 3	Hoichoi	
2020	Lips Don't Lie	Gemplex	
2022	Roohaniyat	MX Player	Megha
2024	Kaantaye Kaantaye	ZEE5	
