= Venky Mysore =

Indian businessman

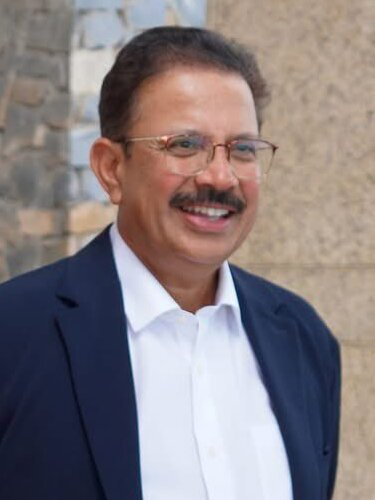
- A picture of Venky Mysore in 2025
- Born: 30 December 1958 (age 67); Mysuru, Mysuru District, Karnataka, India
- Education: University of Madras
- Occupation: Business executive
- Known for: CEO of Red Chillies Entertainment, CEO and managing director of Kolkata Knight Riders
- Website: redchillies.com kkr.in

Venky Mysore is an Indian-American business executive who is the CEO of Red Chillies Entertainment and CEO and managing director of the Indian Premier League team Kolkata Knight Riders.

He was instrumental behind Kolkata Knight Riders buying the Caribbean Premier League team Trinbago Knight Riders (then Trinidad and Tobago Red Steels).

== Early years and education ==
Mysore obtained a Master of Business Administration in marketing and finance from University of Madras.

== Career ==
Venky Mysore served as the chairman of Bangalore chapter of the American Chamber of Commerce from 2002 to 2003. He has experience of over 25 years working in the insurance industry, including experience in North America and in establishing operations in Asia.

He was with MetLife for over 21 years, leaving the company as the managing director of PNB MetLife India Insurance Company Limited in 2010.

He was the country head of India Division and vice president of Sun Life Financial Asia at Sun Life Financial Inc till 2 January 2007. He was a non-executive and non-independent director of Gujarat Sidhee Cement Ltd. He was a director at Birla Sun Life Insurance Company Limited, independent non-executive director at Oberoi Realty Limited and director of Birla Sun Life Asset Management Company Limited.
