= Azhar (film) =

2016 Indian film by Anthony D'Souza

- Theatrical release poster
- Directed by: Anthony D'Souza
- Written by: Rajat Aroraa
- Produced by: Shobha Kapoor; Ekta Kapoor
- Starring: Emraan Hashmi; Lara Dutta; Nargis Fakhri; Prachi Desai; Kunaal Roy Kapur; Manjot Singh
- Cinematography: Rakesh Singh
- Edited by: Dev Jadhav; Vipul Chouhan
- Music by: Songs: Amaal Mallik; Guest Composers: Pritam; DJ Chetas; Background Score: Sandeep Shirodkar
- Production companies: Balaji Motion Pictures; Sony Pictures Networks; Indiana Films Limited
- Distributed by: Panorama Studios
- Release date: 13 May 2016
- Running time: 130 minutes
- Country: India
- Language: Hindi
- Budget: est.₹35 crore
- Box office: est.₹52.88 crore

Azhar is a 2016 Indian Hindi-language biographical sports drama film directed by Anthony D'Souza, inspired by the life of Indian cricketer and former national team captain Mohammad Azharuddin. The film is produced by Shobha Kapoor and Ekta Kapoor for Sony Pictures Networks and features Emraan Hashmi in the title role, with Lara Dutta, Nargis Fakhri, Prachi Desai, and Kunaal Roy Kapur in supporting roles. The film was released worldwide on 13 May 2016 and performed moderately at the box-office.

== Plot ==
The film begins with Indian cricketer Azhar scoring a century in his 99th test match, but he soon faces allegations of match-fixing as his name has been linked with a London based bookie M.K. Sharma aka Shaun. The Indian cricket board slaps a life-ban on him. Azhar decides to challenge the ban in court with the help of his lawyer friend Reddy.

The story shifts back to 1963, when Azhar was born to a comfortable middle-class family in Hyderabad. His grandfather dreamt of Azhar playing 100 tests for Team India and motivates a soft-spoken young Azhar to answer his rivals with his batting skills. Young Azhar goes for an Indian team selection match to Mumbai, where on the match day he receives the bad news of his grandfather's death. Nonetheless, he participates in the match, in accordance with his grandfather's last wish.

Azhar impresses the selectors, sealing his place in Team India and he soon becomes a national hero by scoring 3 consecutive centuries in his first 3 Test matches. Azhar soon marries Naureen and they both begin a happy married life. After a loss against Pakistan in 1991, the President of Cricket Board calls Azhar for a one-to-one meeting. Azhar initially fears getting dropped from the team, but is surprised when he is offered the position of team Captain. Some senior players like Manoj, Ravi and Navjot, resent Azhar's appointment as captain, not wishing to take orders from a younger and less experienced player. But Kapil supports and encourages him to focus on his duty.

While playing in an India–Pakistan match, Javed taunts Azhar, telling him that since Pakistani team is Muslim Allah (god) is with them as it's Jumma (Friday, Muslim holy day) and got rebuked by Azhar who mentioned his own Muslim heritage. Azhar leads his team to victory and soon becomes a successful Captain. At the peak of his career, Azhar's personal life takes a twist when he meets a former Miss India and famous Bollywood actress Sangeeta during an advertising film shoot and instantaneously falls in love with her. Sangeeta likes him too but, aware that he is already married, she warns him to stay away from her. Nevertheless, Azhar is infatuated by her beauty and does not listen to her advice. They begin dating but keep their relationship hidden, until it is suddenly exposed by a gossip magazine.

Azhar has no alternative but to publicly announce his affair with Sangeeta. Heartbroken, Naureen asks him for a divorce and soon Azhar leaves her to marry Sangeeta. During a cricket match against the West Indies, Azhar gets in a spat with team-mate Manoj for a slow run rate in order to complete his century, letting the team lose. Manoj is dropped from the next match and Azhar leads the team to victory. Manoj is humiliated and vows to take revenge. In later years of his career, Azhar, famous for his expensive lifestyle, comes into the eyes of match-fixers. He is soon approached by a London-based bookie M.K Sharma, disguised as a diamond merchant, who later offers him 10 million rupees to under play in a match against Sri Lanka, which Azhar hesitantly accepts.

In a parallel story, after the match-fixing scandal, Azhar is now facing nationwide criticism and a prosecutor, Meera, is building up a strong case against him on the basis of sting operations done by Manoj on Ravi, Navjot and several other cricketers. She also uses the report of the inquiry commission set up by the Cricket Board and secretly meets the bookie M. K. Sharma to gather more evidence. Meera also approaches Naureen, asking her to serve as a witness, but she refuses. Meanwhile, Azhar and his lawyer Reddy are struggling to find any proof of innocence as none of his fellow cricketers are ready to help him out.

Azhar attends a gym-opening ceremony to gain back his old fame in public, but is left insulted by the owner himself. After a long, eight-year legal fight, Reddy finally makes a breakthrough by proving in court that the inquiry commission report is biased, as they were paid by the Cricket Board itself. Reddy even challenges the authenticity of sting operation tapes as none of the witnesses were under oath and hence can not be treated as truth. Later, it is revealed that Azhar took 10 million rupees from the bookie to keep him away from other team members but later scored a match winning innings and returned all the money to the bookie.

On the final day of judgement, both Naureen and Sangeeta attend the court hearing, showing their support for Azhar. Kapil also states in a television interview that he believes Azhar is innocent. In its final verdict, the court lifts the India cricket board ban imposed on Azhar, where at that instinct he used to think that what would have happened if he was out on that day while playing the innings against Sri Lanka.

== Cast ==
- Emraan Hashmi as Mohammad Azharuddin "Azhar"
- Lara Dutta as Meera Verma, the lawyer who prosecutes Azhar
- Nargis Fakhri as Sangeeta Bijlani, Azharuddin's second wife
- Prachi Desai as Naureen, Azharuddin's first wife
- Kunaal Roy Kapur as Advocate Ramakanth Reddy
- Gautam Gulati as Ravi Goyal (Based on Ravi Shastri)
- Manjot Singh as Navjot Singh Bachar (Based on Navjot Singh Siddhu)
- Karanvir Sharma as Manoj Shinde (Based on Manoj Prabhakar)
- Rajesh Sharma as M. K. Sharma aka Shaun (Based on M. K. Gupta)
- Varun Badola as Kapil Jain (Based on Kapil Dev)
- Kulbhushan Kharbanda as Wajihuddin, Azhar's Grandfather
- Hemant Choudhary as Samar (Ad Film Director)
- Veerendra Saxena as Mohammad Azizuddin
- Jameel Khan as Jay Patil (Based on Ajay Sharma)
- Ashok Mandanna as Judge
- Shernaz Patel as Yousuf Sultana
- Ashish Pathode as Ajay Kapur (Based on Ajay Jadeja)
- Shweta Kawatra as Film Magazine journalist (cameo appearance)
- Rajit Kapur as Raj Singh Puri (cameo appearance)
- Navdeep as Meera's boyfriend
- Mohammed Saud Mansuri as Young Azhar Mohammad

== Production ==
=== Development ===
In June 2013, producer Ekta Kapoor had revealed her plans to make a film based on the life of cricketer Mohammad Azharuddin. Saif Ali Khan, Ranbir Kapoor, and Ranveer Singh were considered to play the role. Azharuddin was skeptical about the film until after he had read a copy of the script presented to him by director Anthony D'Souza. Pakistani actress Urwa Hocane was earlier offered the lead female role of Sangeeta Bijlani, however, she refused as she didn't want to do any bold scenes. The role was later given to Nargis Fakhri, who herself is of Pakistani ethnicity. Actress Nyra Banerjee worked as an assistant director for the film. The sports action was done by stunt director Rob Miller. Prachi Desai was signed to play the role of Naureen, the first wife of Azharuddin and she met her personally to get into the skin of character. Lara Dutta played the role of lawyer Meera, the prosecution lawyer against Azhar.

=== Filming ===
Filming began in May 2015. Various scenes for the film were shot at cricket grounds including Lord's, The Oval, Edgbaston, St Lawrence Ground and County Ground, Derby, as well as other places in the United Kingdom including Harleyford Manor, Virginia Water, Mayfield Lavender Farm, and Windsor.

The first schedule of the film was completed in October 2015 in London and the second schedule was also completed in Hyderabad.

=== Controversy ===
The film has generated controversy prior to its release over a storyline that absolves the protagonist Mohammad Azharuddin from charges of fixing matches in return of money. M. A. Ganapathy the former Superintendent of Police in CBI who was the chief investigating officer in the match-fixing case has refuted the movie's clean chit to Azharuddin claiming that his confession is on tape with the CBI. Azharuddin's involvement in match fixing was also accepted by Rakesh Maria, the former head of the Crime Branch and Commissioner of Mumbai Police. In a conversation recorded by the news magazine Tehelka, Maria claims that Azhar had "a criminal bent of mind".

== Music ==
Azhar

Soundtrack album by Amaal Mallik, Pritam and DJ Chetas
- Released: 30 April 2016
- Recorded: 2016
- Genre: Feature film soundtrack
- Length: 23:16
- Language: Hindi
- Label: T-Series

The soundtrack of Azhar was composed by Amaal Mallik. Pritam and DJ Chetas have composed one song each as guest composers. The lyrics were penned by Kumaar, Manoj Yadav and Rashmi Virag. The background score was composed by Sandeep Shirodkar. The album consists of four original songs by Amaal Mallik and Pritam with a recreation by DJ Chetas. With actor Emraan Hashmi.

Pritam was initially hired to compose music for the complete album but due to health issues, he was not able to follow the deadline. Amaal Mallik was then roped in to compose music for the film. T-Series acquired the music rights of the film. DJ Chetas recreated the song "Oye Oye" from Tridev (1989 film) originally composed by Kalyanji–Anandji and written by Anand Bakshi. This song was picturised on Sangeeta Bijlani, who has been portrayed in the film by Nargis Fakhri.

The first single, "Bol Do Na Zara", sung by Armaan Malik was released on 8 April 2016. Following it, the second Single by Pritam which become super hit, "Itni Si Baat Hain", sung by Arijit Singh and Antara Mitra, was released on 15 April 2016. The complete album consisting of 5 tracks was released on 30 April 2016.

=== Track listing ===
| No. | Title | Lyrics | Music | Singer(s) | Length |
|---|---|---|---|---|---|
| 1. | "Itni Si Baat Hain" | Manoj Yadav | Pritam | Arijit Singh, Antara Mitra | 4:55 |
| 2. | "Bol Do Na Zara" | Rashmi Virag | Amaal Mallik | Armaan Malik | 4:53 |
| 3. | "Oye Oye" | Anand Bakshi | DJ Chetas (Original by Kalyanji–Anandji) | Armaan Malik, Aditi Singh Sharma | 3:53 |
| 4. | "Tu Hi Na Jaane" | Kumaar | Amaal Mallik | Sonu Nigam, Prakriti Kakar | 5:33 |
| 5. | "Jeetne Ke Liye" | Kumaar | Amaal Mallik | KK | 4:02 |
| Total length: | | | | | 23:16 |

== See also ==
- Paan Singh Tomar
- Mary Kom
- M.S. Dhoni: The Untold Story
- Bhaag Milkha Bhaag
- Sachin: A Billion Dreams
