= The Bard of Blood =

2015 novel by Bilal Siddiqi

- First edition
- Author: Bilal Siddiqi
- Language: English
- Genre: Spy thriller
- Publisher: Penguin Books and Blue Salt
- Publication date: 2015
- Publication place: India
- Media type: Print (paperback, hardback)
- Pages: 312
- ISBN: 9780143423966

The Bard of Blood is a 2015 Indian fictional espionage thriller novel written by debutant author Bilal Siddiqi. He wrote the novel at the age of 19 during his college days in Mumbai. It was published by Penguin Books.

== Plot ==
Kabir Anand is a former Research and Analysis Wing (RAW) agent and is now a professor of Shakespeare in Mumbai. He was forced to leave RAW after a disastrous mission in Balochistan. He is called by the agency to return after Sadiq Sheikh, his ex-boss, is killed. Meanwhile, Mullah Omar of the Taliban and the ISI are also after him.

== Development ==
Siddiqi said he got a "sudden growing interest in the covert world of espionage" at the age of 17 and "the entire talk of jihad and Islamic extremism that plagued every newspaper." He started writing it at the age of 19 and later met Chiki Sarkar, the then Chief Editor of Penguin Books, through Hussain Zaidi whom he was assisting for a few years. Zaidi recommended Siddiqui's name to Sarkar. She read half the manuscript and then decided to publish it. It took him "roughly a year" to write the novel.

== Adaptation ==
In November 2017, it was announced a Netflix original seven-episode series will be made based on the novel, co-produced by Shah Rukh Khan. The screenplay is written by Siddiqui. The cast includes Emraan Hashmi, Vineet Kumar Singh, Kirti Kulhari, Sobhita Dhulipala, Jaideep Ahlawat, Danish Husain, Rajit Kapur and Shishir Sharma .
