= Bard of Blood =

Indian action thriller series by Netflix

- Official Poster
- Genre: Action; Espionage; Thriller
- Based on: The Bard of Blood by Bilal Siddiqi
- Written by: Mayank Tewari; Bilal Siddiqi
- Directed by: Ribhu Dasgupta; Jay Dev Banerjee
- Starring: Emraan Hashmi; Vineet Kumar Singh; Sobhita Dhulipala; Kirti Kulhari; Abhishekh Khan; Jaideep Ahlawat; Vishwajeet Jaykar; Shamaun Ahmed; Danish Hussain; Sohum Shah; Akshat Chopra
- Theme music composer: Gilad Benamram
- Composer: Gilad Benamram
- Country of origin: India
- Original language: Hindi
- No. of seasons: 1
- No. of episodes: 7

Production
- Producers: Shah Rukh Khan; Gauri Khan; Gaurav Verma
- Cinematography: Chirantan Das
- Camera setup: Multi-camera
- Running time: 40–49 Minutes
- Production company: Red Chillies Entertainment

Original release
- Network: Netflix
- Release: 27 September 2019

Bard of Blood is a 2019 Indian spy thriller television series based on the 2015 espionage novel of the same name by Bilal Siddiqi. Directed by Ribhu Dasgupta and produced by Red Chillies Entertainment, the series stars Emraan Hashmi along with Kirti Kulhari, Vineet Kumar Singh, Jaideep Ahlawat and Sobhita Dhulipala. It is a seven-episode series revolving around the story of an ex-IIW agent. The series premiered on 27 September 2019 on Netflix.

== Overview ==
Kabir Anand is a former Indian Intelligence Wing (IIW) agent who has fallen out after an operation that resulted in his partner's death. He is now a literature teacher who looks after his deceased friend's wife and son. When four Indian intelligence officers are captured by the Taliban in Quetta, secret service director Sadiq Sheikh summons a reluctant Kabir to rescue them. He refuses at first, but when he finally decides to undertake the mission, he arrives at Sadiq's house to find him dead. He is suspected of the murder and is interrogated by intelligence head Arun Joshi, who later allows him to walk free. Upon noticing a man clicking pictures during the cremation of Sadiq, Kabir chases him and instead ends up meeting with analyst Isha Khanna. Decoding a message left by Sadiq before his death, Kabir comes to the conclusion his mission in Balochistan would be unsanctioned, and would involve him, Isha and another agent named Veer Singh who has been working undercover for a long time and wants to go home. Teaming up to complete the mission once they meet, Kabir and team face a lot of challenges on their way to Quetta while Arun learns of the unsanctioned mission and starts tracking them.

== Cast ==
- Emraan Hashmi as Kabir Anand/Adonis
- Vineet Kumar Singh as Veer Singh
- Sobhita Dhulipala as Isha Khanna
- Danish Husain as Mullah Khalid
- Kirti Kulhari as Jannat Marri
- Abhishekh Khan as Nusrat Bashir Marri
- Ajay Mahendru as Rehmat Khatib
- Asheish Nijhawan as Aftab Khalid
- Shamaun Ahmed as Qasim Baluchi
- Jaideep Ahlawat as Tanveer Shehzad
- Rajit Kapur as Sadiq Sheikh
- Shishir Sharma as Arun Joshi
- Amit Bimrot as Nihar Gupta
- Sohum Shah as Vikramjeet
- Shruti Marathe as Neeta
- Sahiba Bali as Abida, ISI agent and love-interest of Tanveer Shehzad
- Kallirroi Tziafeta as Jessica Parker /Sara Mansoor (Cover)
- Nikita Sharma
- Harshvardhan Singh
- Ankit Hans as captured agent
- Akshat Chopra as agent Samar Sharm
- Vishwajeet Jaykar as Saif
- Sharik Khan as Sadiq friend
- Shah Fahad (uncredit)

== Episodes ==
The episode titles are quotations from Shakespearean plays.

No.	Title	Directed by	Written by	Original release date
1	"What's Past is Prologue"	Ribhu Dasgupta	Mayank Tewari	September 27, 2019
When four Indian operatives are taken hostage by the Taliban, a secret service director asks former agent Kabir Anand to take on the rescue mission.
2	"When Sorrows Come, They Come Not Single Spies, but in Battalions"	Ribhu Dasgupta	Mayank Tewari	September 27, 2019
Secret codes left at a murder scene prompt Kabir to reconsider Sadiq's proposed mission in Balochistan and bring on board two unlikely agents.
3	"So Quick Bright Things Come to Confusion"	Ribhu Dasgupta	Mayank Tewari & Bilal Siddiqi	September 27, 2019
A key detail emerges about Khalid's location. Kabir taps into a personal link to the Balochi resistance. Joshi learns of the unsanctioned mission.
4	"Love All, Trust a Few, Do Wrong to None"	Ribhu Dasgupta	Mayank Tewari & Bilal Siddiqi	September 27, 2019
A mystery woman from Kabir's past returns. As the agents devise a risky new plan, Kabir recounts the truth about his last mission in Balochistan.
5	"Fight Fire With Fire"	Ribhu Dasgupta	Mayank Tewari	September 27, 2019
Despite hitting a snag, the agents' oil pipeline job galvanizes the BAF. Khalid begins to doubt Shehzad, who has suspicions of his own.
6	"Heat Not a Furnace for Your Foe So Hot That It Do Singe Yourself"	Ribhu Dasgupta	Mayank Tewari & Bilal Siddiqi	September 27, 2019
Kabir strikes a deal in exchange for an escape route. Veer is met with a surprise at Shehzad's hideout, while the pursuit of Khalid goes awry.
7	"My Stronger Guilt Defeats My Strong Intent"	Ribhu Dasgupta	Mayank Tewari & Bilal Siddiqi	September 27, 2019
With the clock ticking, a showdown occurs at the Taliban stronghold and Kabir races to catch up to Shehzad -- but a curveball is yet to come.

== Release ==
The show features characters interacting in Hindi, Urdu, Pashto and English. It premiered on 27 September 2019 on Netflix.

== Reception ==
Rohan Naahar of The Hindu Times gave 2 stars and wrote "It is one thing to have a poor script to begin with, but the problems metastasise when neither the filmmaking nor the acting is able to elevate it."
