= Footpath (2003 film) =

2003 Hindi-language action drama film

- DVD cover
- Directed by: Vikram Bhatt
- Written by: Mahesh Bhatt; Girish Dhamija
- Based on: Angaarey by Mahesh Bhatt
- Produced by: Mahesh Bhatt; Mukesh Bhatt; Ramesh S. Taurani
- Starring: Emraan Hashmi; Aftab Shivdasani; Irrfan Khan; Bipasha Basu; Rahul Dev
- Cinematography: Pravin Bhatt
- Edited by: Akiv Ali
- Music by: Nadeem-Shravan; Himesh Reshammiya
- Production companies: Vishesh Films; Tips Industries
- Distributed by: Tips Industries
- Release date: 15 August 2003
- Running time: 163 minutes
- Country: India
- Language: Hindi
- Budget: ₹5.5 crore
- Box office: ₹6.43 crore

Footpath is a 2003 Indian Hindi-language action crime drama film directed by Vikram Bhatt. The film stars Emraan Hashmi, Aftab Shivdasani, Bipasha Basu, Irrfan Khan, and Rahul Dev. This marked the debut of Hashmi with his voice being dubbed by Vikram Bhatt. The film is a remake of the 1998 Mahesh Bhatt film Angaarey, which is based on the American film State of Grace.

== Plot ==
Arjun Singh and the Srivastav brothers, Raghu and Shekhar, are neighbors in a gang area in Pune. When Arjun's union leader father is killed, the brothers urge him to avenge his death. They get a sword, find the killers and kill them. While Jaati Hoon Main Plays From Karan Arjun in a bar while Raghu kidnaps a teacher. Arjun is the prime suspect in this homicide and the brothers get him to flee to Ghaziabad, where he begins a new life as a real estate agent, Mohan Kumar Sharma. Years later, Arjun returns to Pune and is welcomed with open arms by Raghu and Shekhar, who are now leading gangsters in their own right. Arjun also renews his romance with the estranged Srivastavs' sister, Sanjana. Sanjana would like Arjun and her brothers to straighten up, and Arjun agrees with her and he starts to work on Raghu, the more flexible of the two, and partially succeeds, especially since Raghu is romantically involved with a school-teacher, who will have nothing to do with him unless he gives up all criminal activity. Raghu is seriously considering going straight when Shekhar gives him the devastating news, that Arjun is not who he claims to be - but a plainclothes police officer, who is out to get them by hook or by crook.

== Cast ==
- Emraan Hashmi as Raghu Srivastav (voiceover by Vikram Bhatt)
- Aftab Shivdasani as Arjun Singh
- Bipasha Basu as Sanjana Srivastav
- Irrfan Khan as Sheikh Qadir
- Rahul Dev as Shekhar Srivastav
- Anup Soni as Police Inspector Ajay Singh
- Aparna Tilak as Shalini Vashisht, The english teacher
- Anupama Verma as Pamela, Shekhar's sister
- Kannan Arunachalam as Police Inspector Adil
- Arif Zakaria as Shyam Ahuja
- Jyothi Rana as item number in Soorat Pe Teri Pyaar Aave
- Aryan Vaid as a dancer in the song "Soorat Pe Teri Pyaar Aave" (special appearance)

== Soundtrack ==
Footpath

Soundtrack album by Nadeem-Shravan and Himesh Reshammiya
- Released: 2003
- Genre: Film soundtrack
- Length: 35:16

Nadeem-Shravan chronology
Hungama (2003)	Footpath (2003)	Zinda Dil (2003)

Himesh Reshammiya chronology
Chura Liyaa Hai Tumne (2003)	Footpath (2003)	Tere Naam (2003)

The film's music was composed by Nadeem-Shravan with one song "Soorat Pe Teri Pyar Aave" composed by Himesh Reshammiya. All lyrics were penned by Sameer. The song "Chain Aapko Mila" also featured in Priyadarshan's Hungama, with Shaan and Sadhana Sargam as vocalists.

No.	Title	Singer(s)	Length
1.	"Kitna Pyaara Pyaara Hai Sama"	Abhijeet, Alka Yagnik	4:44
2.	"Zara Dekh Mera Deewanapan"	Udit Narayan, Alka Yagnik	4:46
3.	"Saari Raat Teri Yaad"	Udit Narayan, Alka Yagnik	4:38
4.	"Chain Aapko Mila"	S. P. Balasubrahmanyam, Asha Bhosle, Anwar Sagar	6:28
5.	"Dil Toh Milte Hai"	Alka Yagnik	4:58
6.	"Soorat Pe Teri Pyar Aave (composed by Himesh Reshammiya)"	Hema Sardesai, KK, Jayesh Gandhi & Rakesh Pandit	5:02
7.	"Dost Milte Hai"	Kumar Sanu	4:58
Total length:			35:16

== Reception ==
Anita Bora of Rediff.com wrote, "The blood and gore, the violence and sometimes profane dialogue is all well to depict life in the streets. But it all seems wasted in the end when some basic questions remain unanswered." Taran Adarsh of Bollywood Hungama rated the film 1 1/2 out of 5 and wrote that "On the whole, FOOTPATH is a routine fare that may not find many takers". A critic from IANS gave the film 2 1/2 out of 5, writing, "Sadly Footpath runs on the much tried and tested path".

== Awards and nominations ==
Awards	Category	Nominees	
Zee Cine Awards	Best Performance by an Actor in a Villain Role	Rahul Dev	Won
Stardust Awards	Best Supporting Actor	Emraan Hashmi	Nominated
Sansui Viewer's Choice Awards	Most promising Debut Actor	Emraan Hashmi	Nominated
