= Awarapan 2 =

2026 Indian film by Nitin Kakkar

- Theatrical release poster
- Directed by: Nitin Kakkar
- Written by: Bilal Siddiqi; Vishesh Bhatt; Nitin Kakkar
- Story by: Vishesh Bhatt
- Produced by: Vishesh Bhatt
- Starring: Emraan Hashmi; Disha Patani; Shabana Azmi; Suvinder Vicky
- Cinematography: Vishnu Rao
- Edited by: Devendra Murdeshwar
- Music by: Songs: Mithoon; Amaal Mallik; Jeet Gannguli; Akhil Sachdeva; Wasif Ahmad; Score: Raju Singh; Joshua Singh
- Production company: Vishesh Films
- Distributed by: Pen Marudhar
- Release date: 14 August 2026
- Running time: 140 minutes
- Country: India
- Language: Hindi
- Budget: est. ₹25–45 crore (Note: Zoom TV reported that the production budget is estimated to be around ₹25–45 crore.)
- Box office: ₹207.4 crore

Awarapan 2 (transl. Vagrancy 2) is a 2026 Indian Hindi-language action thriller film (Note: PeepingMoon reported the genre as action thriller.) directed by Nitin Kakkar and written by Kakkar, Bilal Siddiqi and Vishesh Bhatt. Produced by Bhatt under his namesake banner Vishesh Films and presented by his father Mukesh, it is a sequel to the 2007 film Awarapan and stars Emraan Hashmi, Disha Patani and Shabana Azmi. The film follows former gangster Shivam Pandit, who is revealed to have survived a fatal number on his life roughly two decades earlier, as he embarks on a mission to bust a child trafficking racket in Bangkok after a baby girl he gave up for adoption is declared missing.

The film was announced in March 2025, with principal photography taking place from September 2025 to June 2026 in Bangkok, Rajasthan, Malaysia and Mumbai. Awarapan 2 was released theatrically on 14 August 2026 to mixed-to-positive reviews from critics. A major commercial success, the film grossed over ₹207 crore (US$22 million) worldwide, becoming the eighth-highest-grossing Hindi film of 2026.

== Plot ==
Roughly two decades after the death of his lover Aaliyah, former gangster Shivam Pandit lives a lonely life and continues to visit her grave. One day, he discovers an abandoned baby girl and names her Aaliyah after his deceased lover. The child is later adopted by a couple involved in child trafficking, prompting Shivam to join Interpol to locate her. Officer Samarth Singh, who had previously closed his file following his elimination of his former boss, Bharat Daulat Malik, (Note: As previously shown in Awarapan.) reveals that the couple were killed in an encounter after the baby went missing.

The investigation leads Shivam to Bangkok, where he is tasked with infiltrating a criminal family led by mafioso Amrit Singh. Amrit's son, Zorawar, has taken control of the family's empire and expanded its operations to human trafficking. Shivam is hired to protect Zorawar's siblings, Zara and Sikander, unaware that Zorawar has killed their father in retaliation for opposing his son's criminal activities.

Zara is a gentle, music-loving woman who wants nothing to do with her family's criminal activities and is extremely protective of her autistic brother, Sikander. As Shivam spends more time with her, the two gradually develop a quiet emotional connection. When Zorawar destroys Zara's cello, Shivam gifts her a new one, leading to an unexpected embrace that makes him realise that he is beginning to find peace in her presence. During his investigation, Shivam discovers that Zara has been secretly working against her family to protect Sikander and Zorawar. Despite the secrets they each harbour, Shivam and Zara eventually join forces to rescue the trafficked children, including baby Aaliyah.

== Cast ==
- Emraan Hashmi as Shivam Pandit
- Disha Patani as Zara Singh
  - Myrah Rahul as young Zara
- Shabana Azmi as Nafisa Nawaz
- Puran Gabbi as Zorawar Singh
  - Rivaan Rahul Gajbhiye as young Zorawar
- Suvinder Vicky as Jaideep
- Vijayant Kohli as Mahmud Ali Khan
- Atul Kumar as Interpol Officer Samarth Singh
- Myrah Shivan as Aaliyah Pandit, Shivam's adopted daughter
- Aniruddh Rawal as Sikandar Singh
  - Pratyaksh Pawar as young Sikandar
- Jugkrid Kamdee as Genghis
- Barun Chanda as Amrit Singh
  - Theenash Sachdevas as young Amrit
- Rukhsar Rehman as Namrata
- Richa Jain as Orphanage Caretaker
- Laisharam Khuman Nongyai as Sudeep
- Priyadarshan Samrth as Zorawar's Head Security
- Shriya Saran as Aaliyah Hamid, Shivam's illusion (special appearance)
- Shaad Randhawa as Kabir, Shivam's illusion (special appearance)

== Production ==
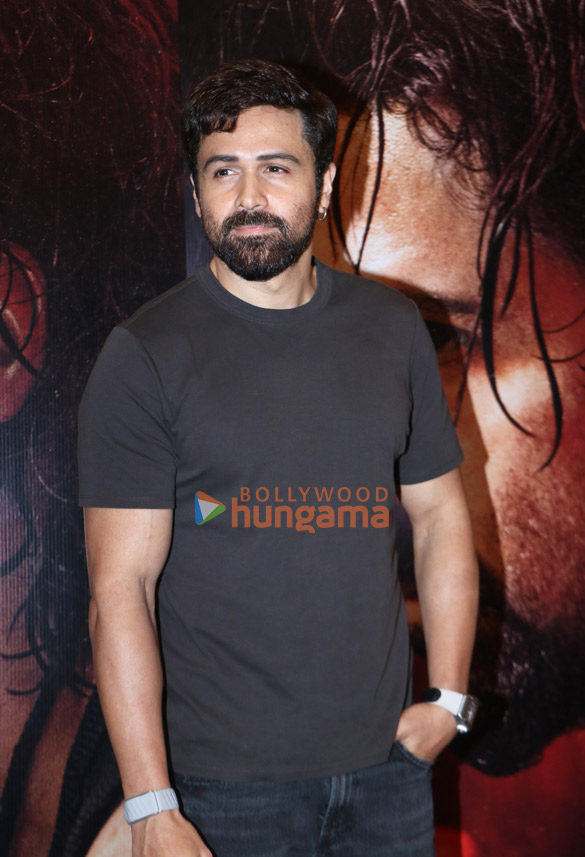
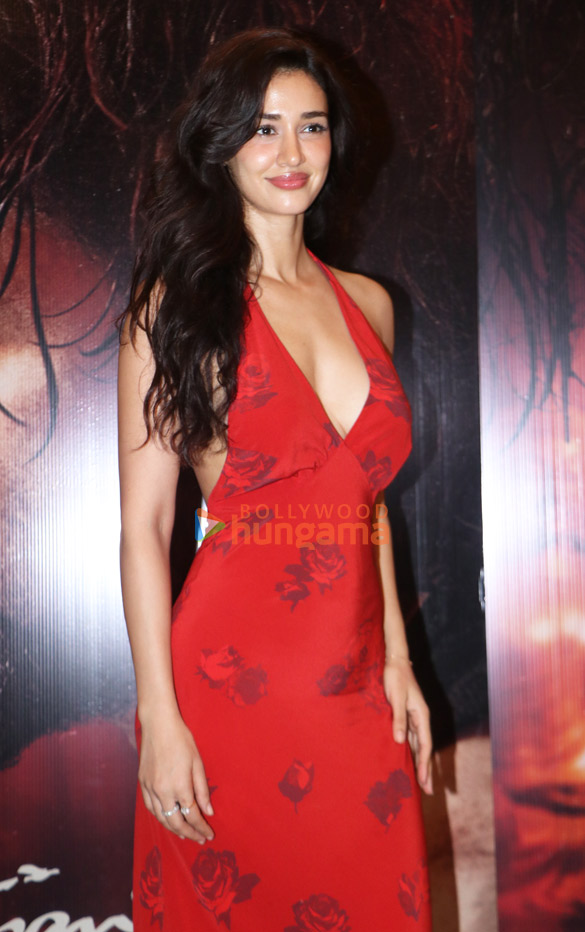
Emraan Hashmi and Disha Patani portray Pandit and Zara respectively

=== Development ===
The film was officially announced by Vishesh Films in March 2025, with Nitin Kakkar confirmed as director and Emraan Hashmi reprising his role, reuniting with the banner nearly a decade after Raaz Reboot (2016); it also marked his first film with banner since the creative split between his uncles Mahesh and Mukesh.

In an interview, writer Bilal Siddiqui said that the team spent several months exploring ideas for the sequel. Vishesh Bhatt, who wrote and produced the sequel and was involved in several creative aspects of the 2007 original, stated that the project was conceived as a direct continuation of the film. Mohit Suri, who directed the original, was not approached to direct the sequel. As Suri was involved in another film at the time, Kakkar was brought on to direct; it was his first directorial venture in six years since Jawaani Jaaneman (2020) and his first original film since Filmistaan (2012). According to Hashmi, the screenplay underwent multiple revisions over nearly two years before being finalised.

=== Casting ===
Manushi Chhillar was reported to have been considered for the female lead but did not join the project due to scheduling conflicts. Later reports stated that she had been neither approached nor considered for the role. Disha Patani was subsequently cast in the role. Shabana Azmi joined the cast as the antagonist. Debutante actor Aniruddh Rawal, son of actor Paresh Rawal, was added to the cast, marking his feature film debut. Debutante Puran Gabbi, the brother of actress Wamiqa Gabbi, was cast as another antagonist after auditioning for the role. Shaad Randhawa and Shriya Saran appeared in cameos, reprising their roles from the original.

=== Filming ===
Pre-production began in April 2025. Principal photography commenced in September 2025, and concluded in June 2026. During filming in Rajasthan, Emraan Hashmi suffered an abdominal injury while performing an action sequence and underwent surgery. Despite stringent measures taken by the production team, pictures from the sets featuring Hashmi's and Patani's looks were leaked onto the internet and went viral. The film was shot in Bangkok, Rajasthan, Malaysia and Mumbai.

== Music ==
The soundtrack to Awarapan 2 consists of 8 songs, composed by Mithoon, Jeet Gannguli, Amaal Mallik, Akhil Sachdeva, and Wasif Ahmad, with lyrics written by Rashmi Virag, Sayeed Quadri, Akhil Sachdeva, and Sachin Urmtosh. The film score was composed by Raju Singh, a norm collaborator of Vishesh Films. The vocals were provided by Subodhh Sharma, Arijit Singh, Saaj Bhatt, Shreya Ghoshal, Akhil Sachdeva and Jubin Nautiyal. The soundtrack album was released by Sony Music on 11 August 2026.

== Marketing ==
In late June 2026, the makers announced the teaser date. The film's teaser was released on 29 June 2026. On 29 July 2026, the makers released a motion poster unveiling Emraan Hashmi's character. Amaal Mallik and Subodhh Sharma performed live at Chandigarh University Freshmen Orientation and Induction Programme 2026 in Mohali, Punjab. Ahead of the trailer release, the makers clarified that the film had not been delayed. The official trailer was released on 6 August 2026.

== Release ==
=== Theatrical ===
Awarapan 2 was released theatrically on 14 August 2026, coinciding with Indian Independence Day weekend. The film was initially scheduled to release on 3 April 2026. However, it was postponed to 14 August 2026, thereby clashing with Batwara 1947. The advance bookings for the film began on 11 August 2026, and saw a "tremendous response". Ahead of its theatrical release, a special screening of the film was held in Mumbai on 13 August 2026.

=== Certification ===
The film received a U/A 16+ certificate from the CBFC on 5 August 2026, with a final runtime of 140 minutes. The Examining Committee ordered 4 minutes of deletions and 20 seconds of replacements, including the addition of static disclaimers for scenes depicting child trafficking and drug consumption, the replacement of objectionable words, the reduction of violent scenes, and adjustments to the end credits.

=== Distribution ===
The film was distributed by Pen Marudhar.

=== Home media ===
Amazon Prime Video acquired the film's digital streaming rights. The film began streaming on the platform from 9 October 2026.

== Reception ==
=== Box office ===
Awarapan 2 grossed approximately ₹173.71 crore (US$19 million) domestically and ₹33.41 crore (US$3.6 million) overseas, for a worldwide gross of ₹207.3 crore (US$22 million).

The film earned ₹21.89 crore net on its opening day in India, with a worldwide gross of ₹27 crore, marking Emraan's highest opening day collection.

The film entered 100 Crore Club on 19 August 2026, collecting over ₹100 crore domestic box office net.

=== Critical response ===
On the review aggregator website Rotten Tomatoes, 47% of 19 critics' reviews are positive, with an average rating of 5.70/10.

Sreeju Sudhakaran of Rediff.com gave the film 2 stars out of 5, appreciating Hashmi's performance. Being critical of the script, he wrote, "Hashmi throws himself into the mass appeal of his character with absolute sincerity. Unfortunately, even his committed performance cannot entirely mask the sheer ordinariness of the broader script." Rishabh Suri of the Hindustan Times gave the movie 3.5 stars out of 5, describing Awarapan 2 as an intentionally old-school sequel that recreates the atmosphere of 2000s Bollywood, with a brooding hero, tragic romance, crime, gunfights and, crucially, the music associated with the original. He noted the plot as decent but predictable, with some repetitive stretches and too much action; however, he argues that the climax works well while the modern production values compensate somewhat for the deliberately dated storytelling. He also highlighted Hashmi's performance as the movie's main strength. A critic at Bollywood Hungama gave the film 3.5 stars out of 5 and remarked, "On the flipside, despite the best efforts, the film falls short of the greatness of Awarapan, which has become a cult classic." Shubhra Gupta of the The Indian Express gave the film 2.5 stars out of 5, concluding, "Hashmi keeps it all humming, and till Awarapan sails along coasting on some eye-catching, snazzy sequences, we enjoy this outing with our brave anti-hero, jiska dard se puraana rishta hai. It's a pity that the film falls into a long, dull third act, which makes us nearly forget the competent genre beats of the rest."

Shreyas Pande of The Hindu reminisced about the director Mohit Suri and the writer Shagufta Rafique, of the predecessor, Awarapan, an unofficial remake of A Bittersweet Life, and said, "Suri's absence is strongly felt when 'To Phir Aao' is heard without any powerful sequence to complement its evocative charm." In his review, he critiqued, "So, even if the action sequences have improved multifold, the lighting has become better equipped at capturing contrast, and the camera offers visuals to marvel over, the film struggles to hold itself together as it imagines the world of Awarapan purely as a generic genre piece, when its soul lies elsewhere." Radhika Sharma of NDTV gave the film 2.5 stars out of 5, summing up in her review, "The film works and only works because of Emraan Hashmi." Vineeta Kumar of India Today gave the film 3 stars out of 5, and wrote, "Hashmi carries the film on his shoulders, right from the first scene. This is his playing field, and nobody, not even some of the best actors of this generation, can quite pull off this particular brand of brooding, wounded masculinity the way he does. Awarapan 2 is, in many ways, a reminder that you simply cannot deny Emraan Hashmi once he decides to take over the screen".

=== Audience response ===
In late June 2026, the film was named as one of the most anticipated Indian 2026 films by IMDb.

== Future ==
The ending of the film left room for a sequel and it was reported that the film would have a sequel.
