= Sobhita Dhulipala =

Indian actress (born 1992)

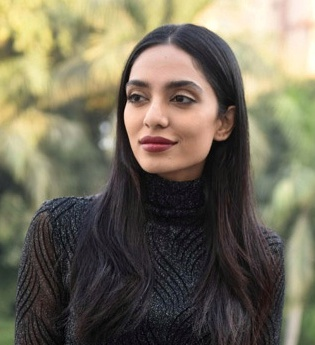
- Dhulipala in 2018
- Born: 31 May 1992 (age 34); Tenali, Andhra Pradesh, India
- Education: University of Mumbai
- Occupation: Actress
- Years active: 2013–present
- Title: Femina Miss India Earth 2013
- Spouse: Naga Chaitanya (m. 2024)
- Family: Akkineni–Daggubati family

Sobhita Dhulipala (Telugu: [ʃoːbʰit̪a d̪ʰuːɭipaːɭːɐ]; born 31 May 1992) is an Indian actress and beauty pageant titleholder. She won runner-up title Femina Miss India Earth 2013 at Femina Miss India 2013 pageant and represented India at Miss Earth 2013. Dhulipala made her acting debut in Anurag Kashyap's Raman Raghav 2.0 (2016) and subsequently played the lead role in the Amazon Prime Video series Made in Heaven (2019–2023), that earned her recognition.

Dhulipala went on to appear in commercial successes—the Telugu films Goodachari (2018) and Major (2022), the Malayalam films Moothon (2019) and Kurup (2021), the two-part Tamil epic Ponniyin Selvan: I (2022) and Ponniyin Selvan: II (2023), and the Hindi crime thriller series The Night Manager (2023). She expanded to American cinema with the action thriller Monkey Man (2024). Dhulipala is married to actor Naga Chaitanya.

== Early life ==
Dhulipala was born on 31 May 1992, in Tenali, Andhra Pradesh into a Telugu Brahmin family. Her father, Venugopala Rao, was a Merchant Navy engineer and her mother Santha Kamakshi was a primary school teacher. She grew up in Visakhapatnam. She moved to Mumbai by herself at the age of sixteen and later attended H.R. College of Commerce and Economics in University of Mumbai, studying corporate law. She is also a trained classical dancer in Kuchipudi and Bharatanatyam. In her late teens, Dhulipala was crowned the Navy Queen at the annual Navy Ball in 2010.

== Pageantry ==
A college friend of Dhulipala's was interning at the Miss Office and suggested she audition for the upcoming pageant. Describing herself as an "uncool geek" and stating she wished for validation, Dhulipala entered with the intentions of only clearing the first round to prove to her friends she could.

Subsequently, she represented India in Miss Earth 2013, in the Philippines, but could not finish in the top 20, instead landing sub-titles of Miss Photogenic, Miss Beauty for a cause, Miss Talent and Miss Beautiful face. She also featured in 2014 edition of Kingfisher Calendar.

== Acting career ==
=== Early work and career expansion (2016-2021) ===
Dhulipala made her film debut opposite Vicky Kaushal in Raman Raghav 2.0 in 2016. Her performance earned her nomination for Screen Award for Most Promising Newcomer – Female. and also signed a three-film deal with Phantom Films in July 2016. Her next two releases were; Chef (2017), directed by Raja Menon and Kaalakaandi (2018), directed by Akshat Verma, both opposite Saif Ali Khan. Both films emerged as critical and commercial failures. In 2018, Dhulipala also marked her debut in Telugu films with Goodachari opposite Adivi Sesh. She played a psychology graduate and a terrorist gang agent. The film is considered one of the "25 Greatest Telugu Films Of The Decade" by Film Companion. It also emerged as a commercial success.

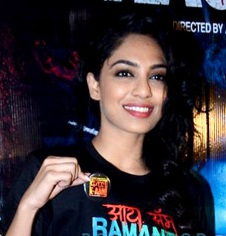
Dhulipala at an event

The year 2019 proved to a turning point in Dhulipala's career. She first made her Malayalam film debut with Moothon opposite Nivin Pauly. She then appeared in the Hindi film The Body opposite Emraan Hashmi. Following this, she expanded to web with two series that met with positive response. Dhulipala portrayed Tara, a wedding planner in Amazon Prime's series Made In Heaven alongside Arjun Mathur and Jim Sarbh. A reviewer of The Hindu called her layered and empathetic portrayal "a standout". The series met with high viewership. She then reunited with Emraan Hashmi in Bard of Blood, an spy thriller Netflix series, based on the 2015 espionage novel of the same name. She played an intelligence agency operative.

Dhulipala played a pregnant woman in the anthology Ghost Stories, which was released in 2020. She was part of Anurag Kashyap's segment. In 2021, Dhulipala appeared in Kurup, where she played a criminal's wife opposite Dulquer Salman. The film became a critical and commercial success, and ranks among the highest-grossing Malayalam films of all time.

=== Critical recognition and further success (2022-present) ===
Dhulipala earned further commercial success in the following year. In 2022, she first played a guest stuck in the hotel, in the Hindi-Telugu biographical Major. The film met with positive response and Mayank Shekhar of Mid-Day felt that she "shines" in a relatively fleeting part. A box office success it became the highest grossing Telugu film of the year. Spanning over 2022 and 2023, she played Vanathi in two part Tamil films: Ponniyin Selvan: I and Ponniyin Selvan: II. Both films rank as the fifth and eighth highest-grossing Tamil film of all time respectively.

Further in 2023, Dhulipala appeared in two web series. She then appeared alongside Anil Kapoor and Aditya Roy Kapur in two seasons of The Night Manager. For the series, she won ITA Award for Best Actress - Popular (OTT). Dhulipala then reprised Tara in the second season of Made In Heaven. Shomini Sen noted, "Sobhita makes Tara her own. She brings out the complexities of the character so well. She looks gorgeous and performs her role with earnestness."

Dhulipala made her expansion to English films with Dev Patel’s directorial debut Monkey Man, which he also starred in. Before her initial film debut, she auditioned for the role and, in 2019, Patel called to tell her he knew she was perfect for it from the moment he saw her audition. In a mixed review, The Guardian's Adrian Horton described Dhulipala's presence as "alluring" but lamented the lack of characterisation she was given. Later that year, she played an interior designer opposite Rajeev Siddhartha in the Hindi film Love, Sitara. Reviewing the film, Rishab Suri stated, "Sobhita as Sitara infuses life into her character who is torn between her past and present."

Following no release in 2025, Dhulipala returned to Telugu films in 2026, with Cheekatilo, where she portrayed a journalist who owns a podcast and is following a series of murder in the city. The film released digitally on Amazon Prime Video. Sangeetha Devi Dundoo noted, "Sobhita makes the most of an author-backed role, shedding glamour to inhabit Sandhya as a grounded, girl-next-door presence. Her Telugu dialogue delivery is precise."

== Personal life ==
Dhulipala began dating Naga Chaitanya in 2022. After two years of relationship, they got engaged on 8 August 2024 in Hyderabad. Dhulipala married Chaitanya on 4 December 2024 at Annapurna Studios, Hyderabad.

== In the media ==
Dhulipala in 2023

Dhulipala has frequently appeared in Times 50 Most Desirable Women list. She was placed 23rd in 2013, 29th in 2014 and 34th in 2016. She was placed 5th in Hyderabad Times Most Desirable Woman list of 2013.

== Filmography ==
Key
†	Denotes films that have not yet been released

=== Films ===
List of film credits
Year	Title	Role	Language	Notes	Ref.
2016	Raman Raghav 2.0	Smrutika Naidu "Simi"	Hindi		
2017	Chef	Vinnie	Hindi		
2018	Kaalakaandi	Tara	Hindi		
2018	Goodachari	Sameera Rao / Sameera Sheikh (Note: Sobhita Dhulipala played a single character with two or more names.)	Telugu		
2019	Moothon	Rosy	Malayalam		
2019	The Body	Maya Verma	Hindi		
2020	Ghost Stories	Neha	Hindi	Anurag Kashyap's segment	
2021	Kurup	Sharadamma / Sharadha Kurup	Malayalam		
2022	Major	Pramoda Reddy	Telugu; Hindi	Bilingual film	
2022	Ponniyin Selvan: I	Vaanathi	Tamil		
2023	Ponniyin Selvan: II	Vaanathi	Tamil		
2024	Monkey Man	Sita	English	American film	
2024	Love, Sitara	Sitara	Hindi		
2026	Cheekatilo	Sandhya Nelluri	Telugu		
2026	Vettuvam †	Radhi	Tamil	Post-production	

=== Television ===
- All shows are in Hindi unless otherwise noted.

List of television credits
Year	Title	Role	Network	Language	Notes	Ref.
2019–2023	Made in Heaven	Tara Khanna	Amazon Prime Video	English	2 seasons	
2019	Bard of Blood	Isha Khanna	Netflix	Hindi		
2023	The Night Manager	Kaveri Dixit	Disney+Hotstar	Hindi	1 season	

== Accolades ==
Year	Award	Category	Work	Result	Ref.
2018	Screen Awards	Most Promising Newcomer – Female	Raman Raghav 2.0	Nominated	
2019	iReel Awards	Best Actress - Drama	Made in Heaven	Nominated	
2022	South Indian International Movie Awards	Best Actress – Malayalam	Kurup	Nominated	
2023	South Indian International Movie Awards	Best Supporting Actress – Telugu	Major	Nominated	
2023	Indian Television Academy Awards	Best Actress Popular – OTT	The Night Manager	Won	
2023	Bollywood Hungama India Entertainment Awards	Game Changer Best Actor of the Year – Female	Made in Heaven & The Night Manager	Won	
2024	Filmfare Awards South	Best Supporting Actress – Telugu	Major	Nominated	
2024	Filmfare OTT Awards	Best Actor Female – Drama Series	Made in Heaven	Nominated	

== Notes ==
Awards and achievements
Preceded by Prachi Mishra	Miss Earth India; 2013	Succeeded by Alankrita Sahai
