= Tumsa Nahin Dekha: A Love Story =

- DVD cover
- Directed by: Anurag Basu
- Written by: Subodh Chopra
- Based on: Arthur
- Produced by: Mukesh Bhatt
- Starring: Emraan Hashmi; Diya Mirza; Anupam Kher
- Cinematography: Sanjay K. Memane
- Edited by: Akiv Ali
- Music by: Nadeem-Shravan
- Production company: Vishesh Films
- Distributed by: Saregama Films
- Release date: September 24, 2004
- Running time: 126 minutes
- Country: India
- Language: Hindi
- Budget: ₹7 crore
- Box office: ₹5.03 crore

Tumsa Nahin Dekha: A Love Story (transl. I haven't seen anyone like you) is a 2004 Indian Hindi-language musical romance film directed by Anurag Basu and produced by Mukesh Bhatt. The film stars Emraan Hashmi and Dia Mirza in lead roles with Sharat Saxena, Surekha Sikri, Uday Tikekar, Atul Parchure and Anupam Kher in supporting roles. It was released on 24 September 2004. Upon release, the film received mixed reviews from critics and was a commercial failure.

== Synopsis ==
The film starts with Daksh Mittal, a charming and continually drunk billionaire. One day, he runs into a girl, Jiya, on the street and falls in love at first sight. Jiya works as a dancer and has a mentally disabled brother. Daksh and Jiya spend some time with each other and fall in love. Daksh, however, is supposed to marry Anahita Madhwan in order to inherit a million-dollar trust.

For help, Daksh turns to his butler, John Uncle. John Uncle wants Daksh to end up marrying Jiya. However, John becomes very ill and gets admitted to a hospital. The engagement party for Daksh and Anahita is taking place, and John Uncle manages to convince Jiya to go to the party.

Daksh and Jiya dance, and meanwhile, John Uncle is dying at the hospital. Daksh decides to honour John Uncle's memory and goes to propose to Jiya; she accepts, and after a final clash with the family, Daksh is allowed to marry her, and they live happily ever after.

== Cast ==
- Emraan Hashmi as Daksh Mittal
- Dia Mirza as Jiya Khan
- Anupam Kher as John D'Costa
- Pooja Bharti as Anahita Madhvani, Daksh's ex-fiancee
- Sharat Saxena as Devendra Madhvani
- Uday Tikekar as Mr. Mittal, Daksh's father
- Surekha Sikri as Mrs. Mittal, Daksh's grandmother
- Atul Parchure as Nikki Khan, Jiya's mentally challenged brother
- Surabhi Vanzara as Reshma, Jiya's friend
- Avtaar Gill as Bar owner

== Soundtrack ==
The music of this movie was given by Nadeem-Shravan. The album features 9 songs with 8 original tracks and one other version of Bheed Mein. The song Yeh Dhuan Dhuan features Richard Clayderman with the lead vocalist Roopkumar Rathod. The response for album was excellent at music platforms in India. Singers like Udit Narayan, Shreya Ghoshal, Roop Kumar Rathod, Sonu Nigam and Shaan have lent their voices in this album.

All lyrics are written by Sameer; all music is composed by Nadeem-Shravan.

No.	Title	Singer(s)	Length
1.	"Bheed Mein"	Udit Narayan and Shreya Ghoshal	5:59
2.	"Mujhe Tumse Mohabbat Hai" (remix)	Shaan, Shreya Ghoshal	6:03
3.	"Mujhe Tumse Mohabbat Hai"	Shaan, Shreya Ghoshal	5:51
4.	"Yeh Dhuan Dhuan"	Roop Kumar Rathod and Shreya Ghoshal	5:45
5.	"Tanhaiyan"	Sonu Nigam	5:18
6.	"Woh Humse Khafa Hain"	Udit Narayan and Shreya Ghoshal	5:13
7.	"Dhanak Ka Rang"	Shreya Ghoshal	4:51
8.	"Maine Soch Liya"	Udit Narayan and Shreya Ghoshal	4:18
9.	"Bheed Mein" (version 2)	Udit Narayan and Shreya Ghoshal	6:01
Total length:			49:19

== Reception ==
Taran Adarsh of Bollywood Hungama wrote. "On the whole, TUMSA NAHIN DEKHA has excellent music as its trumpcard, but it falters in that one department that is the lifeline of every film - script". In a retrospective review in 2020, Rishita Roy Chowdhary of India Today wrote that "Tumsa Nahin Dekha is not an unusual film. But we believe it makes a bold move, if not take a giant leap in terms of modern storytelling".
