= Rensil D'Silva =

Indian filmmaker

- Born: Mumbai, India
- Occupations: Film director, screenwriter
- Spouse: Chandini D'Silva
- Children: 1

Rensil D'Silva is an Indian screenwriter and film director.

== Career ==
Rensil D'Silva has been an advertising Creative Director for nearly two decades. He has worked in advertising agencies like JWT, Rediffusion, Saatchi & Saatchi, Mudra DDB, Ogilvy & Mather and has started O&M's second agency Meridian in 2008. He is also an ad filmmaker of repute. During the course of his two decades in advertising he has won numerous international and national awards.

Rensil started his career in feature films as a story writer for the 2001 movie, Aks. Later he wrote the screenplay for movies such as Shoebite/ Johnny Mastana (2008) and Rang De Basanti, a 2006 patriotic drama which received wide critical acclaim as well as commercial success and won numerous Indian Film Awards including a nomination for BAFTA Award for Best Film Not in the English Language at the 2007 British Academy of Film and Television Arts awards. Ace film director Karan Johar recognized his talent and offered him to direct his movie Kurbaan under his own Dharma Productions for which the screenplay was written by D'Silva himself. The film was nominated for several Indian awards. In 2011 he wrote the screenplay for Karan Johar's feature film Student of the Year. During the same period, he wrote the story and screenplay for his next directorial venture, Ungli. Rensil D'Silva has also written and directed the Indian version of the international TV series, 24, starring Anil Kapoor (2013). This he has done for both Seasons 1 & 2. He has also worked extensively with directors as diverse as Karan Johar, Mani Ratnam, Shoojit Sircar and David Dhawan.

== Filmography ==
=== Films ===
Year	Title	Director	Writer	Notes
2001	Aks	No	Yes	
2006	Rang De Basanti	No	Yes	
2009	Luck	No	Yes	
2009	Kurbaan	Yes	Yes	Directorial debut
2012	Student of the Year	No	Yes	
2014	Ungli	Yes	Yes	
2019	Thambi	No	Yes	Tamil language film
2021	Dial 100	Yes	Yes	

=== Television ===
Year	Title	Creator	Director	Writer	Producer	Notes
2013–2016	24	No	Yes	Yes	No	
2023	Bambai Meri Jaan	Yes	No	Yes	No	Co- created with Shujaat Saudagar
2024	Bad Cop	No	No	Yes	No	
TBA	Panthers †	Yes	Yes	Yes	Yes	In-production
