= Mumbai Saga =

2021 Indian action film directed by Sanjay Gupta

- Theatrical release poster
- Directed by: Sanjay Gupta
- Written by: Robin Bhatt; Sanjay Gupta; Vaibhav Vishal
- Story by: Sanjay Gupta
- Produced by: Bhushan Kumar; Krishan Kumar; Anuradha Gupta; Sangeeta Ahir
- Starring: John Abraham; Emraan Hashmi; Kajal Aggarwal; Mahesh Manjrekar; Suniel Shetty; Prateik Babbar; Gulshan Grover
- Cinematography: Shikhar Bhatnagar
- Edited by: Bunty Nagi
- Music by: Songs: Yo Yo Honey Singh; Payal Dev; Tanishk Bagchi; Background Score: Amar Mohile
- Production companies: T-Series; White Feather Films
- Distributed by: AA Films
- Release date: 19 March 2021
- Running time: 125 minutes
- Country: India
- Language: Hindi
- Budget: ₹64 crore
- Box office: est. ₹22.29 crore

Mumbai Saga is a 2021 Indian Hindi-language crime action film directed by Sanjay Gupta and produced by T-Series and White Feather Films. It features an ensemble cast of John Abraham, Emraan Hashmi, Kajal Aggarwal, Mahesh Manjrekar, Rohit Roy, Anjana Sukhani, Prateik Babbar, Samir Soni, Amole Gupte and Gulshan Grover. Set in the '80s and '90s, Mumbai Saga shows changing phases of Mumbai by closing mills to make malls and high-rise buildings.

Mumbai Saga was released theatrically on 19 March 2021 and underperformed commercially as collections were affected by the resurgence in COVID-19 pandemic cases which had led to a night curfew and lockdown imposition in Maharashtra.

== Plot ==
In mid-1980s Mumbai, Amartya Rao Naik belongs to a lower middle class family and his father sells vegetables at a railway overbridge.

All the vendors are forced to pay protection money to gangster Gaitonde. One day, some of the Gaitonde's henchmen assault Amartya's teenage brother Arjun bloodied. Enraged, Amartya thrashes the entire gang. He is then arrested by the police and subjected to further abuse by Gaitonde's henchmen. He is able to fight them all and earns the respect of criminal Nari Khan, who warns Gaitonde of any further action. Amartya soon receives bail through 'Bhau', the party leader of the local Chatrapati Sena which is known for its violent ways and scouts for musclemen like Amartya.

With Bhau's enmity towards Gaitonde, Amartya meets Nari's key aide and gets information on Gaitonde's operations, where he attacks his men and is able to confiscate all his arsenal. Later, Amartya secures bail for Nari and also threatens Gaitonde to get out of his way.

Gaitonde realizes his diminishing strength and resents his fate. Amartya gets uninhibited control of the city with Bhau's help. Amartya sends Arjun to a boarding school to keep him away from his path of violence. Years later, Amartya is married to his childhood friend Seema, who arranges now grownup Arjun's marriage to his sweetheart Nilam and sends the newlywed couple to London again, intending to keep him away from Amartya's criminal life.

Meanwhile, Gaitonde has now struck a deal with a mill owner Sunil Khaitan as he plans to oust the mill workers in order to utilize the mill land for a large reality project to take advantage of the newly liberalized economy. Wary of Gaitonde's rapid attempts to rise again, Amartya kills Khaitan after he refuses to heed his warnings.

Arjun returns to India and is attacked by Gaitonde's men as retribution for Khaitan's murder; on the other hand, Khaitan's wife Sonali announces a bounty of ₹10 crore to any policeman who kills Amartya. Inspector Vijay Savarkar leads an investigation into Amartya's case and gets hold of Sadashiv, a weakling of Amartya's gang. Sadashiv rats on his colleagues and Vijay is able to kill 4 of them. Arjun correctly suspects Sadashiv as the rat to verify this, Amartya asks Sadashiv to meet him at a park. He reaches there disguised as a taxi driver and spots policemen prepared for an ambush. Coincidentally, Vijay hires his taxi for his office and they greet each other as Vijay leaves his taxi.

Later, Arjun kills Sadashiv, who was under police protection, bribes the constables and shoots one of them in the arm to project it as an ambush. Bhau advises Amartya to leave the country since Khaitan's death, coupled with the "ambush" on the police, has put a lot of pressure on the police force to find him and it is not safe for him to stay in the city anymore. Amartya leaves for London and Arjun now runs the gang. Vijay gets a court order against Arjun under the TADA act, and warns him against absentia, stating that he would get an encounter order from the court by default and would be free to kill him even in public place. Arjun is shot by Gaitonde's man when he appears in the court, but survives the attack and becomes permanently paralyzed.

An angry Amartya returns to India despite Bhau's warnings, rescues Arjun from the police, and prepares to take him to London for treatment. Vijay extracts Amartya's whereabouts from Gaitonde and tries to nab him but gets brutally beaten by Amartya. It is then revealed that Vijay is an ex-party supporter of Bhau and was promoted in the police force at his behest. Amartya meets Bhau and requests him to pull Vijay off his track, and Bhau obliges, but reveals to Vijay that Amartya's time as a crime boss is over. On a desolate runway, Khan arrives on a chartered flight to take Arjun and Amartya to the UK, but they are attacked by Vijay. Gunfire ensues with Amartya, and he explodes a petrol tanker with Vijay in it. Amartya manages to get Arjun on the aircraft just as Vijay reappears and shoots him, but Khan makes away with Arjun.

The film ends with Bhau handing Mumbai rule over the same privileges Amartya had to Baba, Amartya's right hand and Vijay wonder about this circle arc. In the end, a note shows what happens to Arjun and the gang and Vijay later after the events of the film.

== Cast ==
- John Abraham as Amartya Rao Naik, a criminal (based on Amar Naik)
- Emraan Hashmi as Inspector Vijay Savarkar (based on Vijay Salaskar)
- Kajal Aggarwal as Seema Rao Naik (based on Anjali Naik)
- Mahesh Manjrekar as Chief Minister Bhau (based on Bal Thackeray)
- Suniel Shetty as Anna Sada (special appearance)
- Prateik Babbar as Arjun Rao Naik, Amartya's brother (based on Ashwin Naik)
- Gulshan Grover as Nari Khan (based on a drug lord of a same name)
- Amole Gupte as Gaitonde (based on Arun Gawli)
- Rohit Roy as Jaykar "Baba" Shinde (Amartya Rao's henchman)
- Samir Soni as Sunil Khaitan (based on Sunit Khatau)
- Anjana Sukhani as Sonali Khaitan
- Shaad Randhawa as Jagannath, Amartya Rao's henchman
- Tithi Raaj as Nilam Rao Naik, Arjun Rao's wife (based on Nita Naik)
- Vivaan Parashar as Sadashiv (based on Santosh Pangarkar)
- Rajendra Gupta as Mr. Naik, Amartya and Arjun Rao's father
- Kanan Arunachalam as Inspector Mastekar
- Akash Khurana as Samir Khaitan, Sunil's father
- Pawan Chopra as Commissioner Mario
- Ivan Rodrigues as Journalist Sanjay
- Ashish Warang as MLA Vishwas Patil

=== Special appearances ===
- Yo Yo Honey Singh in the song "Shor Machega"
- Hommie Dilliwala in the song "Shor Machega"
- Shruti Sinha in the song "Shor Machega"

== Production ==
Principal photography commenced on 27 August 2019 in Mumbai and also took place in Hyderabad. The film wrapped up in October 2020.

== Soundtrack ==
Mumbai Saga

Soundtrack album by Yo Yo Honey Singh, Payal Dev and Tanishk Bagchi
- Released: 24 March 2021
- Recorded: 2020
- Genre: Feature film soundtrack
- Length: 10:19
- Language: Hindi
- Label: T-Series

The film's music was composed by Yo Yo Honey Singh, Payal Dev and Tanishk Bagchi while lyrics written by Hommie Dilliwala, Yo Yo Honey Singh, Prashant Ingole and Manoj Muntashir.

Track listing
| No. | Title | Lyrics | Music | Singer(s) | Length |
|---|---|---|---|---|---|
| 1. | "Shor Machega" | Hommie Dilliwala, Yo Yo Honey Singh | Yo Yo Honey Singh | Yo Yo Honey Singh, Hommie Dilliwala | 3:28 |
| 2. | "Danka Baja" | Prashant Ingole | Payal Dev | Dev Negi | 3:03 |
| 3. | "Lut Gaye" | Manoj Muntashir | Tanishk Bagchi | Jubin Nautiyal | 3:48 |
| Total length: | | | | | 10:19 |

== Reception ==
=== Box office ===
Mumbai Saga earned ₹2.82 crore at the domestic box office on its opening day. On the second day, the film had a slight dip as it collected ₹2.40 crore. It recovered on the third day by collecting ₹3.52 crore, taking the total domestic opening weekend collection to ₹8.74 crore.

As of 2 April 2021, with a gross of ₹19.68 crore in India and ₹2.61 crore overseas, the film has a worldwide gross collection of ₹22.29 crore.

=== Critical response ===
On the review aggregator website Rotten Tomatoes, 33% of 9 critics' reviews are positive, with an average rating of 4.8/10. Taran Adarsh gave the film 3.5 out of 5 stars calling Mumbai Saga "Power-Packed" and wrote, "Action-packed entertainer with powerful dialogue and terrific performance by John Abraham and Emraan Hashmi".

Conversely, Shubhra Gupta of The Indian Express gave the film 1.5 out of 5, writing, "Except for Gupte, who is clearly enjoying himself, reminding one of similar roles he has played before, there really is no one who is self-aware enough to carry off this saga."
