= Nitin Kakkar =

Indian film director

- Occupation: Film director

Nitin Kakkar is an Indian director known for his works Mitron (2018), Jawaani Jaaneman (2020). And his notable work is Awarapan 2 (2026)

== Filmography ==
Year	Title	Notes
2012	Filmistaan	
2018	Mitron	
2019	Notebook	
2020	Jawaani Jaaneman	
2020	Ram Singh Charlie	
2026	Awarapan 2	director and co-writer
