= Ungli =

2014 Indian film by Rensil D'Silva

- Theatrical release poster
- Directed by: Rensil D'Silva
- Written by: Story & Screenplay: Rensil D'Silva; Dialogues: Milap Zaveri
- Produced by: Hiroo Yash Johar; Karan Johar
- Starring: Emraan Hashmi Randeep Hooda Kangana Ranaut Neha Dhupia Angad Bedi Neil Bhoopalam Sanjay Dutt; Arunoday Singh
- Cinematography: Hemant Chaturvedi
- Edited by: Deepa Bhatia
- Music by: Songs: Salim–Sulaiman; Sachin–Jigar; Aslam Keyi; Gulraj Singh; Background Score: John Stewart Eduri
- Production company: Dharma Productions
- Distributed by: AA Films (India); Reliance Entertainment (Overseas)
- Release date: 28 November 2014
- Running time: 114 minutes
- Country: India
- Language: Hindi
- Budget: ₹390 million
- Box office: ₹500 million

Ungli (transl. Finger) is a 2014 Indian Hindi-language vigilante crime thriller film directed by Rensil D'Silva and produced by Hiroo Yash Johar and Karan Johar under Dharma Productions. The film stars Emraan Hashmi, Randeep Hooda, Kangana Ranaut, Neha Dhupia, Angad Bedi, Neil Bhoopalam and Sanjay Dutt. Mahesh Manjrekar, who collaborated with Dharma Productions for the first time, appears in a negative role. The film was released on 28 November 2014.

== Plot ==
4 friends Kalim (Angad Bedi), Gautam (Neil Bhoopalam), Maya (Kangana Ranaut) and Abhay (Randeep Hooda) delve into what seems to be their "first case", having started the Ungli gang, which fights against corruption. Their job is to bug corrupt people and teach them moral lessons quite unconventionally. They target a corrupt minister and become the most wanted people in Mumbai, but also earn respect, affection, and admiration in the media and general public.

Meanwhile, ACP Ashok Kaale (Sanjay Dutt) meets his superior, DCP Shivraman (Shiv Kumar Subramaniam) who introduces him to Police Commissioner Arvind Kaul (Raza Murad) with the task of deciphering the Ungli gang. Later, Kaale travels to another police station where he meets an amusingly frustrated officer, Kaale's colleague and bomb-squad commandant Shishir Mishra (Shishir Sharma), who is disgusted with the "crime" his recruit Nikhil Abhyankar (Emraan Hashmi) has done. Eventually, it goes so: a college was attended to by the bomb squad when there was news that a bomb was planted there. Nikhil took advantage of the situation and met his girlfriend (Rachel White) with whom he shared a kiss, but soon they were caught by the dogs of the Bomb Squad. Later, it surfaced up that the call was made from Mishra's desk, and Nikhil did it. Kaale finds it funny at first and points out the clever act Nikhil made, but when the officer reprimands Nikhil and himself, Kaale visits Nikhil's mother (Reema Lagoo) where she tells him that Nikhil had the qualities of his father, Kaale's colleague Arvind, and that Nikhil was raised by Kaale like his own son. Nikhil, it is shown, attends a disco bar, where Kaale calls him up to discuss matters concerning the "Ungli" gang.

Nikhil begins searching for altruistic opportunities to earn the Ungli gang great fame, once by blowing up the roads in front of a minister's house and accusing politicians and PWD workers of torturing the people by lavishly spending money on renovation of roads directly linked to houses and offices of politicians and corporates alone, another instance by putting up a label of dishonesty on the auto-rickshaw drivers by accusing them of charging high rates and showing reluctance when asked to drive to places close by. Finding him adamant, Maya suggests that Nikhil too has wishes to join the gang, and on certain terms and conditions, the four friends admit Nikhil, and narrate the story behind the gang's formation.

Maya's brother Rajeev Singh aka Ricky (Arunoday Singh) was a great fitness freak and struck a rapport with the four friends quite a time. However, one day, while trying to prevent a scuffle between an old man (Avijit Dutt) and a drunk youngster name Anshuman, Ricky tried to defend the old man, but Anshuman struck him hard, landing him straight into coma. The old man later decided to complain to the police, but was advised against it by the police itself, when the people of powerful bureaucrat B.R. Dayal (Mahesh Manjrekar), Anshuman's father, spoke so. The old man was firm, but when his granddaughter, while waiting at a bus stop, was threatened with an acid attack, the old man was forced to swerve from his stand to protect her. This plunged Maya into grief, but Abhay was angry at one of Maya's comments and this paved the way for the "Ungli" gang. Nikhil poses as a law student to illusion the four.

While preparing for a raid, Nikhil sprained his knee, but later called up Kaale when the four left. However, feeling remorseful, he later attacked Kaale to defend his new "friends", but when his identity was discovered, the four friends slammed him with Abhay hitting him hard, and Kaale further hitting him, but Nikhil later chides Kaale for believing the "Ungli" gang as a criminal force. However, when faced with a loss of duty, finding that DCP Shivraman is trying to bribe him into getting a posting of choice to save ends, Kaale agrees with Nikhil, and seeks out the gang to expose Dayal. Meanwhile, Abhay confesses to his co-worker, Tiesta Sen (Neha Dhupia) his love for her as well as his identity of the "Ungli" gang.

Exposing a dirty racquet of money makers in the widely distributed Mumbai police force with a simple chemical trick involving sulphur sprayed over printed notes that would leave a lasting black impressions on the officer's tongue via saliva, Kaale regains duty and is promoted to the post of Commissioner, getting Dayal and Anshuman arrested. Later, Kaale reassures the gang that the city won't need another as long as everything is under control.

== Cast ==
- Emraan Hashmi as Nikhil Abhyankar
- Randeep Hooda as Abhay Kashyap
- Sanjay Dutt as ACP Ashok "Kaali" Kale
- Kangana Ranaut as Maya Singh
- Neha Dhupia as Tiesta Sen
- Angad Bedi as Kalim
- Neil Bhoopalam as Gautam a.k.a. Goti
- Arunoday Singh as Rajeev "Ricky" Singh, Maya's brother
- Rajat Kaul as Anshuman
- Raza Murad as Commissioner Arvind Kaul
- Sunil Shinde as Chief Minister
- Mahesh Manjrekar as Bureaucrat B.R. Dayal
- Shiv Kumar Subramaniam as DCP Shivraman
- Reema Lagoo as Nikhil's mother
- Elli Avram as Anika
- Rachel White as Nikhil's girlfriend
- Charanpreet Singh as friend
- Shishir Sharma as Shishir Mishra
- Pawan Chopra as Prosecution Lawyer
- Vikas Shrivastav as Inspector Bhende
- Shraddha Kapoor as Basanti (Special appearance in song "Dance Basanti")
- Parikshit Sahni as Kalim's father (special appearance)

== Reception ==
Mid-day gave the film 3 stars out of 5, highlighting the direction and performances, and said the film would have been "wonderful" except for the dialogues, which it said were sometimes "downright idiotic".

== Soundtrack ==
Ungli

Soundtrack album by Salim–Sulaiman, Sachin–Jigar, Gulraj Singh, and Aslam Keyi
- Released: 2014
- Recorded: 2014
- Genre: Feature film soundtrack
- Label: Sony Music India

Sachin–Jigar chronology
Happy Ending (2014)	Ungli (2014)	Badlapur (2015)

Gulraj Singh chronology
Ungli (2014)

Aslam Keyi chronology
Ungli (2014)

Ungli was initially supposed to be a songless film with John Stewart Eduri composing the original background score, but eventually came to develop a five-song soundtrack given Hashmi's maiden association with Dharma. Salim–Sulaiman, who had previously composed music for writer and director Rensil D'Silva's debut film Kurbaan (2009), contributed the song "Auliya" sung by Armaan Malik to the soundtrack, while Sachin–Jigar, Gulraj Singh and Aslam Keyi composed the remainder of it, Singh contributing two tracks to the album. The song "Dance Basanti", composed by Sachin-Jigar and sung by Vishal Dadlani and Anushka Manchanda, was the first single track starring Hashmi and guest star Shraddha Kapoor to be released on 28 October 2014. Amitabh Bhattacharya wrote lyrics for both songs.

Singh, a former music assistant to Shankar–Ehsaan–Loy, contributed two tracks, both written by Manoj Yadav. "Pakeezah", the second single track sung by Singh picturised on Hashmi and Ranaut, was released on 3 November 2014. The first version of the title track, "Respected Aadarniya Ungli", was featured directly in the film and is sung by Dadlani and Neeti Mohan. The second version, "Ungli Pe Nachalein", a promotional video to which was picturised on Hashmi, was released on 11 November 2014. Sung by Dev Negi and Shipra Goyal and written by Kumaar, it was composed by Keyi, who previously scored music for War Chhod Na Yaar.

=== Track listing ===
No.	Title	Lyrics	Music	Singer(s)	Length
1.	"Dance Basanti"	Amitabh Bhattacharya	Sachin–Jigar	Vishal Dadlani, Anushka Manchanda	3:43
2.	"Paakeezah"	Manoj Yadav	Gulraj Singh	Gulraj Singh	4:25
3.	"Ungli Pe Nachalein"	Kumaar	Aslam Keyi	Dev Negi, Shipra Goyal	3:39
4.	"Aadarniya Ungli"	Manoj Yadav	Gulraj Singh	Vishal Dadlani, Neeti Mohan	3:46
5.	"Auliya"	Amitabh Bhattacharya	Salim–Sulaiman	Armaan Malik	3:21
Total length:					18:53

== Awards and nominations ==
Award	Category	Recipients and nominees	Result	Ref.
7th Mirchi Music Awards	Upcoming Male Vocalist of The Year	Gulraj Singh – "Pakeezah"	Won	
7th Mirchi Music Awards	Upcoming Music Composer of The Year	Gulraj Singh – "Pakeezah"	Nominated	
7th Mirchi Music Awards	Upcoming Lyricist of The Year	Manoj Yadav – "Pakeezah"	Nominated	
