= Emraan Hashmi =

Indian actor (born 1979)

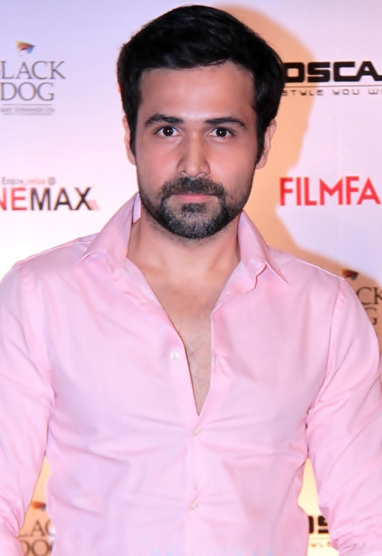
- Hashmi at an event in 2013
- Born: Syed Emraan Anwar Hashmi; 24 March 1979 (age 47); Mumbai, Maharashtra, India
- Education: University of Mumbai
- Occupation: Actor
- Years active: 2003–present
- Spouse: Parveen Shahani (m. 2006)
- Children: 1
- Relatives: Bhatt family; Varma family

Syed Emraan Anwar Hashmi (pronounced [ɪmraːn ˈɦaːʃmi]; born 24 March 1979) is an Indian actor who primarily works in Hindi cinema. Initially recognized as a male sex symbol, he has since taken on dramatic roles in a variety of genres, appearing in Forbes India's Celebrity 100 list in 2013. Hashmi has received four Filmfare Award nominations.

After making his acting debut with the 2003 crime-thriller Footpath, Hashmi followed with starring roles in several successful thrillers primarily produced by Bhatt brothers Mahesh and Mukesh under Vishesh Films, including Murder (2004), Zeher, Kalyug, and Aashiq Banaya Aapne (all 2005), Aksar and Gangster (both 2006), and the cult classic Awarapan (2007). This was followed by a period of further success in the genre with Jannat (2008), The Dirty Picture (2011), Murder 2 (2011), and Jannat 2 (2012), as well as the horror films Raaz: The Mystery Continues (2009) and Raaz 3 (2012). Throughout the mid-2000s to 2010s, Hashmi's filmography became renowned for its hit soundtracks, associating him with decade-defining music. Many of these films also featured him French kissing his female co-stars, a rarity in the industry at the time. This earned him the "serial kisser" moniker.

In the following years, Hashmi diversified his roles and earned three Filmfare Award nominations for Best Supporting Actor for his performances in Once Upon a Time in Mumbaai (2010), Shanghai (2012), and Tiger 3 (2023), and enjoyed acclaim with the biographical dramas Azhar (2016) and Haq (2025). After a period of expansion to streaming with Taskaree (2026), and a foray into Telugu cinema with an antagonistic part in the action thriller They Call Him OG (2025), a career resurgence as sole lead followed with the sequel Awarapan 2 (2026).

In addition to acting, Hashmi has launched an auto-biographical book that dealt with his son's illness, and is an endorser for brands and products. He is married to Parveen Shahani.

== Early life ==
Hashmi was born on 24 March 1979, in Mumbai, Maharashtra, India. His father, Anwar Hashmi, is a businessman, who also acted in the mystery film Baharon Ki Manzil (1968), and his mother, Maherrah Hashmi, was a homemaker. His paternal grandfather, Syed Shaukat Hashmi, migrated to Pakistan after the partition of India, where he worked as a journalist and as a film director, while his grandmother, Meherbhano Mohammad Ali (known by her screen name Purnima), was an actress, who stayed in India. Meherbano Mohammad Ali later married producer-director Bhagwan Das Varma, making him Hashmi's step-grandfather and Hashmi a part of the Varma family. Hashmi is also a part of the Bhatt family as Meherbano was the sister of actress Shirin Mohammad Ali, the mother of producers Mahesh Bhatt and Mukesh Bhatt, who are thus Hashmi's uncles. Hashmi is the second cousin of director Mohit Suri, with whom he has collaborated in several films, actresses Pooja Bhatt and Alia Bhatt and actor Rahul Bhatt.

Hashmi studied at the Maneckji Cooper Education Trust School. Later on, he graduated in Bachelor of Commerce (B.Com.) from Sydenham College in the University of Mumbai.

== Career ==
=== 2003–2007: Breakthrough with erotic-thrillers ===
Hashmi made his acting debut under the tutelage of the Bhatt brothers with Vikram Bhatt's thriller Footpath (2003), alongside Bipasha Basu and Aftab Shivdasani, where he played a Raghu Shrivastav, a gangster. His performance was appreciated by critics with Gaurav Malani describing him as the "scene-stealer" and praised his mannerisms. The film was a critical and commercial failure. The following year, he made his breakthrough with Anurag Basu's erotic thriller Murder (2004), co-starring Mallika Sherawat and Ashmit Patel. Taran Adarsh of Bollywood Hungama wrote about his performance "Hashmi is fantastic in a role that seems tailor-made for him. Potraying an obsessive lover flourish, there's not denying that the narrative gets a major impetus thanks to Hashmi's performance". Murder emerged as a commercial success, grossing a domestic total of ₹250 million (US$2.7 million), becoming the eighth highest-grossing film of the year. He also starred in Anurag's musical romance Tumsa Nahin Dekha opposite Dia Mirza. The film was a box-office disaster, although Hashmi's performance received mixed-to-positive reviews. A review from BBC Online noted that he was "becoming fabulous with every film".

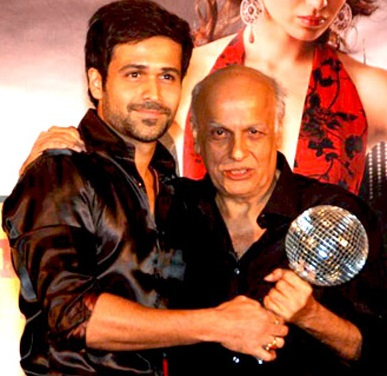
Hashmi at an event with his uncle Mahesh Bhatt

In 2005, Hashmi appeared in four films. His first release of the year Zeher, a mystery thriller directed by Suri in his debut and produced by Mahesh Bhatt, was an adaptation of the 2003 American film Out Of Time. The film was a moderate success at the box office. The songs 'Agar Tum Mil Jao' & 'Jaane Jaa Jaane Jaa' were chartbusters while other songs were also extremely popular with the song 'Woh Lahme' being a big rage among the youth. His second release of that year was the romantic-thriller Aashiq Banaya Aapne directed by Aditya Datt. Inspired by the 2001 American film Tangled, it co-starred Sonu Sood and debutant Tanushree Dutta, and followed a love triangle between their characters. The film, his first not to be produced by his uncles, received positive reviews, and was a sleeper hit. His third film was the crime-thriller Chocolate, directed by Vivek Agnihotri in his directorial debut. Hashmi played a supporting role in an ensemble cast of Anil Kapoor, Suniel Shetty, Irrfan Khan, Arshad Warsi, Tanushree Dutta, and Sushma Reddy. The film was inspired by the 1995 American film The Usual Suspects. His final film of the year was a supporting role in Suri's action thriller Kalyug, once again produced by his uncles under Vishesh Films, alongside Kunal Khemu, Smilie Suri, Amrita Singh, Ashutosh Rana, and Deepal Shaw. Based on the sex industry, the film depicted the devastating effect that non-consensual pornographic films have on the subjects. Hashmi featured as Ali Bhai, a man who runs a sex shop. His performance, and the film, garnered positive reviews from critics, with Taran Adarsh writing: "Hashmi makes a brief, but solid, appearance and the actor is, like always, highly competent." Kalyug emerged as a moderate commercial success in India.

Hashmi's first appearance in 2006 was Anant Mahadevan's erotic thriller Aksar alongside Udita Goswami and Dino Morea. The film was a commercial success and well received from critics. His second release was Anurag's romantic thriller Gangster: A Love Story co-starring debutante Kangana Ranaut and Shiney Ahuja in lead roles. The film emerged as a commercial success at the box-office, grossing over ₹190 million (US$2.0 million) in India. It opened to positive reviews from critics upon release, with Hashmi's portrayal of Akash Kapadia, an undercover detective, receiving particular praise. Rediff.com's Raja Sen wrote, "Hashmi's character is an understated one, and he manages to keep it that way. There is no unnecessary bluster or melodrama, and he does a pretty believable job. There is something lazy about his acting, by which I mean he makes the job look easy." Hashmi's performance in the film earned him a nomination for the Filmfare Award for Best Performance in a Negative Role. His next releases, the crime-thriller The Killer (adapted from the 2004 film Collateral) and the romance Dil Diya Hai, both emerged as critical and commercial failures.

In 2007, Hashmi appeared in three films. His first release was the comedy Good Boy Bad Boy alongside Tusshar Kapoor, Isha Sharvani and Tanushree Dutta. The film received negative reviews from critics upon release and emerged as a commercial failure at the box-office. He next played a gangster in Suri's neo-noir action drama Awarapan (2007) alongside Mrinalini Sharma and Shriya Saran. The film received positive reviews from critics upon release, with particular praise directed towards Hashmi's performance. Writing for the Hindustan Times, critic Khalid Mohamed described it as "intense and believable". Subhash K Jha wrote: "...Hashmi [is] an actor who conceals more than he reveals on screen. There is an inherent pain in his personality that this film taps better than anything he has done earlier. This film marks the emergence of a major talent." Despite positive critical reception, it emerged as a commercial disaster at the box-office. However over the years, Awarapan gained cult status, primarily due to Hashmi's performance. In Pakistan in particular, following Awarapan he became "the most sought after hero", even ahead of the Khan's when it comes to the local box-office. His final release of the year was the romantic thriller The Train, co-starring Geeta Basra and debutante Sayali Bhagat in lead roles. Narrating the story of a married couple caught in a complex extramarital love triangle, the film received mixed reviews from critics upon release, and emerged as a commercial failure at the box-office.

=== 2008–2012: Commercial success ===
Hashmi's only film appearance in 2008 was debutant Kunal Deshmukh's crime romance Jannat. Depicting a love story set against the backdrop of match fixing, the film also starred Sonal Chauhan, Javed Sheikh and Sameer Kochhar. Both the film and Hashmi's performance as Arjun Dixit, a bookmaker, received mixed-to-positive reviews from critics; Taran Adarsh commented that "[t]he actor displays the gamut of emotions with aplomb, [and] he changes expressions like a chameleon changes colors. Jannat is yet another turning point in his career." The film emerged as a commercial success in India, with revenues of over ₹420 million (US$4.5 million).

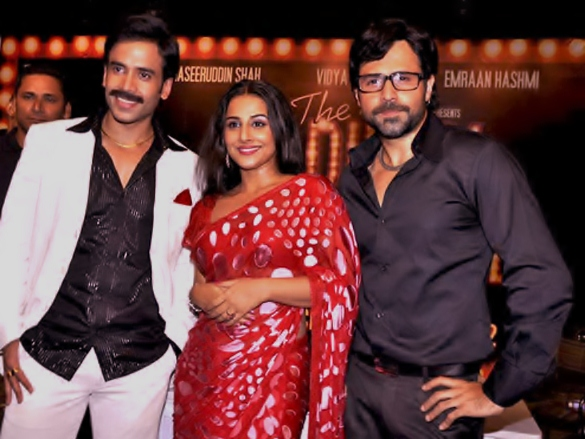
Hashmi (right) with co-stars Tusshar Kapoor and Vidya Balan at the audio release of The Dirty Picture in 2011

In 2009, Hashmi appeared in Suri's supernatural horror film Raaz: The Mystery Continues, alongside Ranaut and Adhyayan Suman. Hashmi's portrayal of a painter, and the film, received mixed-to-positive reviews; The Times of India's Nikhat Kazmi wrote: "Hashmi is fast emerging as the Colin Farrell of Indian cinema: completely mercurial, eclectic and unpredictable. As the brooding, prescient painter, who paints death on his canvas and falls in love with one of subjects, he is suitably aggrieved, desperate and afraid." Its domestic collection exceeded ₹340 million (US$3.6 million), emerging as a commercial success at the box-office. He then starred opposite Soha Ali Khan in Deshmukh's romantic drama disaster Tum Mile, which narrated a love story set against the backdrop of the 2005 Maharashtra floods. The film received mixed-to-positive reviews from critics upon release; however, it emerged as a commercial failure at the box-office.

The following year, Hashmi featured in Milan Luthria's period action drama Once Upon a Time in Mumbaai with an ensemble cast including Ajay Devgan, Kangana Ranaut, Prachi Desai and Randeep Hooda. The Ekta Kapoor-produced film, which depicted the rise of organised crime in Mumbai, saw Hashmi play Shoaib Khan, a character inspired by real-life gangster Dawood Ibrahim. With a domestic revenue of over ₹780 million (US$8.3 million), Once Upon A Time in Mumbaai emerged as a commercial success at the box-office, ranking as the seventh highest-grossing Hindi film of the year. The film received positive reviews from critics upon release, with particular praise for Hashmi's performance. Blessy Chettiar of Daily News and Analysis described him as "top class", while Komal Nahta remarked: "This is easily Hashmi's best performance so far. If he is cute in the romantic scenes, he is believably tough in the action and dramatic scenes." For his performance, Hashmi received his first nomination for the Filmfare Award for Best Supporting Actor. His next release that year was Suri's action thriller Crook, based on the controversy surrounding racial violence against Indians in Australia. However, the film was panned by critics and emerged as a commercial disaster at the box-office.

Hashmi began 2011 with Madhur Bhandarkar's romantic comedy Dil Toh Baccha Hai Ji alongside Devgn, Omi Vaidya, Shazahn Padamsee, Tisca Chopra and Shruti Hassan. The film, and Hashmi's performance, received mixed reviews from critics upon release, and emerged as a commercial failure at the box-office. He next featured in Suri's psychological action thriller Murder 2, alongside Jacqueline Fernandez. The film, and Hashmi's performance, received mixed-to-positive reviews from critics. Shubhra Gupta of The Indian Express wrote: "Hashmi gets to do what he does best, glowering at the men, bedding the ladies, and towards the end, going head to head with the bad guy [...] he goes through the film with his usual smart one-liners containing equal amounts of bluster and fluster." Murder 2 emerged as a commercial success at the box-office, with a domestic revenue of over ₹476 million (US$5.1 million). His final film appearance that year was Luthria's biographical musical drama The Dirty Picture, featuring Vidya Balan as the controversial Indian actress Silk Smitha, alongside Naseeruddin Shah and Tusshar Kapoor. He portrayed Abraham, the narrator, who proclaims himself to be the protagonist's biggest enemy. The film opened to widespread critical acclaim, with praise for Hashmi's performance; CNN-IBN's Rajeev Masand wrote: "Hashmi is highly restrained as Abraham, a director who believes in film as art, and who abhors the idea of inserting steamy numbers in his movie to lure in the crowds." However, several critics were sceptical about his role in the film; Soumyadipta Banerjee from Daily News and Analysis considered it "out of place". It emerged as a major commercial success with a worldwide revenue of over ₹1.14 billion (US$12 million). Murder 2 and The Dirty Picture ranked as the ninth and seventh highest-grossing Hindi films of the year.

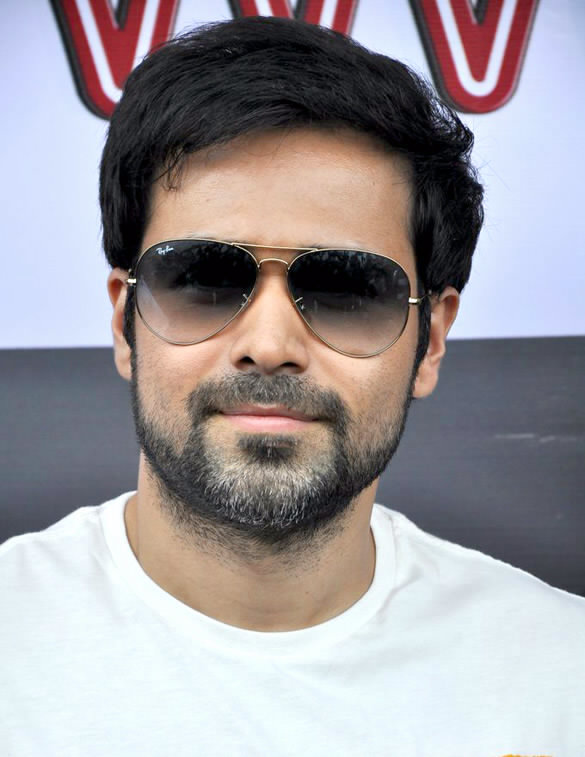
Hashmi at an event for Jannat 2 in 2012

In 2012, Hashmi appeared in Deshmukh's crime thriller Jannat 2 alongside Hooda and Esha Gupta. It was initially titled Informer, but was later changed to the current title, making it a follow-up film to Jannat (2008). The film received mixed reviews from critics upon release, but emerged as a commercial success at the box-office. He next starred alongside Abhay Deol, Prosenjit Chatterjee and Kalki Koechlin in Dibakar Banerjee's political thriller Shanghai, an adaptation of writer Vassilis Vassilikos's novel Z and the 1969 French film of the same name. Set in a fictional town called Bharat Nagar, it traced corruption in India. The film opened to critical acclaim upon release, and Hashmi received widespread praise for his portrayal of Joginder Parmar, a videographer who sometimes shoots porn films. Madhureeta Mukherjee of The Times of India wrote that Hashmi "looks the part and pulls off an act he should be proud of." Raja Sen described it as one of his best performances and wrote: "Hashmi delivers a knockout punch as he masters a complicated role" and called it as "the year's finest, bravest and most consistent performance." Hashmi's next appearance that year was for Vikram Bhatt's supernatural horror film Raaz 3: The Third Dimension, the third film in the Raaz film series, where he again starred alongside Gupta in a second consecutive collaboration while reuniting with Bipasha, who returned to the franchise after having starred in the 2002 original. It emerged as a major commercial success at the box-office, and opened to mixed-to-positive reviews from critics; however, Hashmi's performance received mixed reviews. critic Kunal Guha commented: "[Hashmi] takes his role as seriously as he could but his efforts couldn't exorcise the devilishly terrible plot from spelling doom for this film." Lisa Tsering of The Hollywood Reporter wrote: "The swarthy Hashmi [...] does a forgettable job. His final film of the year was Shamin Desai's delayed thriller Rush, which emerged as a critical and commercial disaster at the box-office.

=== 2013–2025: Career fluctuations ===
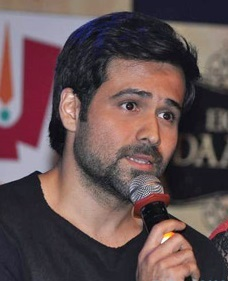
Hashmi promoting Ek Thi Daayan in 2013

In 2013, Hashmi's first film appearance was in debutant Kannan Iyer's supernatural thriller Ek Thi Daayan, alongside Konkona Sen Sharma, Huma Qureshi and Koechlin in lead roles; it was produced by Kapoor and composer Vishal Bhardwaj, who also co-wrote the script. The film, and Hashmi's performance, opened to positive reviews from critics upon release. Saibal Chatterjee of NDTV mentioned that Hashmi "gives the character of the haunted magician just that – a haunted feel that is just apt", whilst Shubhra Gupta called his performance "consistent", adding that he "is a performer who keeps getting better". His second appearance that year was for Raj Kumar Gupta's comedy thriller Ghanchakkar opposite Balan, his first collaboration with Balan's husband, producer Siddharth Roy Kapur, and UTV Motion Pictures chieftain Ronnie Screwvala. The film, and Hashmi's performance, opened to mixed-to-negative reviews from critics upon release. Sneha May Francis of Emirates 24/7 wrote that "Hashmi spins one of his acting career's most understated, yet imposing performances. He crafts [his character's] predicaments – his anger, frustration and suspicions – with effortless charm." Rajeev Masand was more critical of his performance, reflecting that he "struggles to shine under the limited scope of his role." On the commercial front, Ek Thi Daayan emerged as a below-average grosser, while Ghanchakkar emerged as a commercial disaster.

In 2014, Hashmi starred in Deshmukh's crime thriller Raja Natwarlal (produced by Kapur for UTV following Screwvala's exit) and Rensil D'Silva's crime drama thriller Ungli (his third collaboration each with Ranaut and Hooda, and the trio's first with Dharma Productions frontman Karan Johar), both of which emerged as critical and commercial failures at the box-office, with the latter being Hashmi's fifth consecutive commercial failure. He then played the leading role in Academy Award-winning director Danis Tanović's drama Tigers, produced by Anurag Kashyap, which premiered at 2014 Toronto International Film Festival and was later released digitally on the on-demand platform ZEE5 in November 2018.

In 2015, Hashmi appeared in two films, the first being the science fiction action film Mr. X from Vikram Bhatt alongside Amyra Dastur, which emerged as a critical and commercial disaster at the box-office. His second film that year was the long-awaited musical romantic drama Hamari Adhuri Kahani, opposite Balan for the third time, alongside Rajkummar Rao. Directed by Suri in their fifth collaboration, the film was based on the love story of Mahesh Bhatt's parents, Nanabhai Bhatt, Shirin Mohammad Ali and his stepmother Hemlata Bhatt. It opened to mixed-to-positive reviews from critics upon release, but emerged as a moderate commercial success at the box-office. The same year, he appeared alongside Gupta in the music video of the romantic song "Main Rahoon Ya Naa Rahoon" composed by Armaan Malik and Amaal Malik, and presented by T-Series.

The following year, he starred in the biographical drama Azhar (2016), based on the life of Indian cricketer and former national team captain Mohammad Azharuddin. The film opened to mixed-to-negative reviews from critics upon release, and emerged as a commercial failure at the box-office. He next appeared in Vikram Bhatt's Raaz: Reboot (2016), the fourth film in the Raaz film series. It emerged as a critical and commercial disaster at the box-office.

Hashmi's run of commercial failures continued in 2017 with Luthria's action adventure Baadshaho co-starring alongside Devgn, Ileana D'Cruz, Gupta and Vidyut Jammwal, another critical and commercial disaster. The same year, he also began shooting for Captain Nawab, but the film was later shelved.

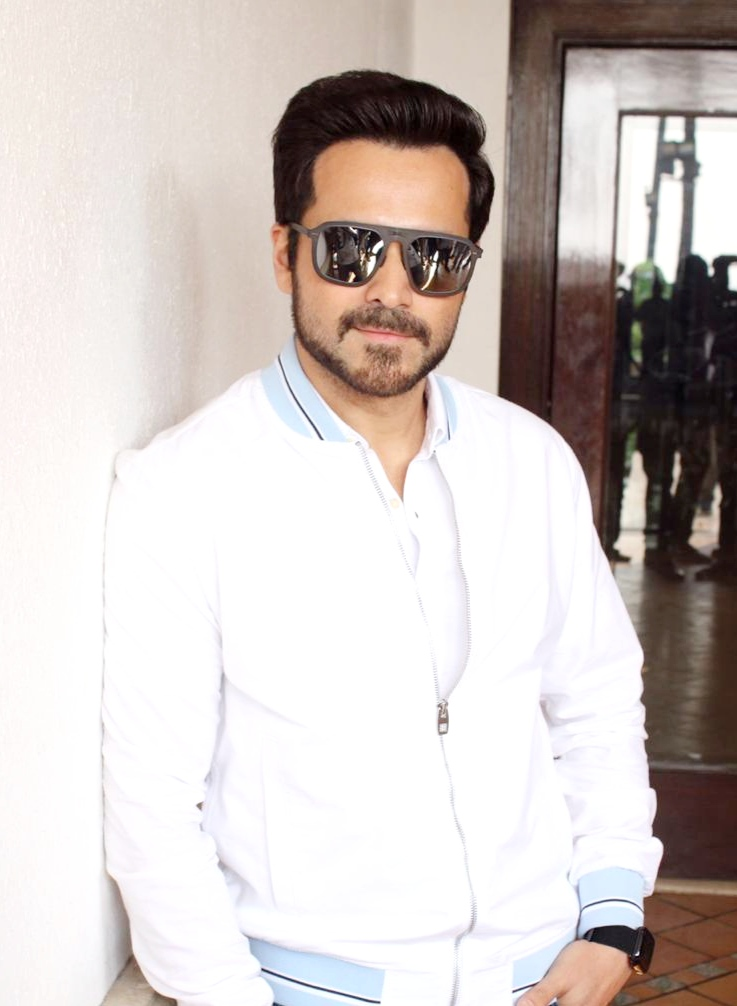
Hashmi promoting The Body in 2019

Hashmi made his OTT debut with the spy thriller web series Bard of Blood opposite Sobhita Dhulipala, Jaideep Ahlawat and Vineet Kumar Singh, which was based on the novel of the same name by Bilal Siddiqui. Produced by Shah Rukh Khan and released on Netflix, it opened to mixed reviews from critics, though his performance as excommunicado agent Kabir "Adonis" Anand was praised.

In 2019, he starred in the crime drama Why Cheat India, which marked his production company's debut, and the mystery thriller The Body, the latter co-starring Rishi Kapoor in his final film appearance, with both films again emerging as critical and commercial disasters. The same was the fate of his 2021 releases – the crime action film Mumbai Saga, the mystery thriller Chehre (co-starring Amitabh Bachchan) and the supernatural horror film Dybbuk. The same year, Hashmi also featured in the music video of the romantic song "Lut Gaye", presented by T-Series, directed by Radhika Rao and Vinay Sapru, and sung by Jubin Nautiyal.

In 2022, Hashmi featured in the music video "Ishq Nahi Karte" sung by B Praak and Jaani. After no film releases in 2022, he returned to screen in 2023 with the action comedy-drama Selfiee, co-starring Akshay Kumar, in his second collaboration with Johar. A remake of the 2019 Malayalam-language film Driving Licence, the film emerged as a critical and commercial disaster.

Hashmi returned to mainstream cinema when he starred as Aatish Rehman, a rogue Pakistani ISI agent, in Maneesh Sharma's action thriller Tiger 3, co-starring Salman Khan and Katrina Kaif. The film is a part of the YRF Spy Universe. The film opened to mixed-to-positive reviews from critics upon release, with particular praise for Hashmi's performance. It emerged as a major commercial success at the box-office, grossing ₹466.63 crore (US$50 million) worldwide, ranking as the sixth highest-grossing Hindi film of the year, the ninth highest-grossing Indian film of the year and the 26th highest-grossing Indian film of all time. His performance in the film earned him his third nomination for the Filmfare Award for Best Supporting Actor. The following year, he headlined the television series Showtime (2024) produced by Johar under his company's digital arm Dharmatic Entertainment. Co-starring Naseeruddin Shah and Mahima Makwana, it premiered on the streaming platform Disney+ Hotstar. A year later, he appeared in the lukewarmly received Ground Zero (2025), portraying BSF officer Narendra Nath Dhar Dubey; the film, based on true events, chronicles Dubey's operation against terrorist mastermind Ghazi Baba, and marked Hashmi's first collaboration with Excel Entertainment founders Ritesh Sidhwani and Farhan Akhtar.

Hashmi made his debut in Telugu cinema with Sujeeth's action thriller They Call Him OG, co-starring Pawan Kalyan and Priyanka Arul Mohan. He was seen recently in Neeraj Pandey starrer Netflix series, Taskaree: The Smuggler's Web opposite Sharad Kelkar and Zoya Afroz.

=== 2026–present: Resurgence ===
Following a period of mixed box-office outcomes, Hashmi experienced a career resurgence with the release of Awarapan 2, a sequel to his 2007 film Awarapan, that marked his reunion with Vishesh Films. Reprising his role as Shivam, the film achieved the highest solo-opening of his career and emerged as a commerical success at the box-office.

== Personal life ==
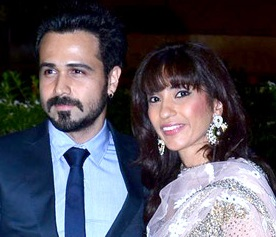
Hashmi with wife Parveen Shahani in 2013

Hashmi married Parveen Shahani in an Islamic wedding ceremony in December 2006 after a six and a half-year relationship. The couple have a son, Ayaan Hashmi, who was born on 3 February 2010. On 15 January 2014, Ayaan was diagnosed with first-stage cancer. In January 2019, Ayaan was declared cancer free.

While Hashmi's father is Muslim and his mother was Christian, Hashmi was brought up as a Muslim and says he is a "firm believer in God". His mother, Maherrah Hashmi, died on 11 March 2016, Hashmi cancelled one day shoot of his film Azhar, when he got to know about his mother's demise. He did not want to delay the shoot of Azhar any further and also wanted to occupy his mind with work. So, he returned to the sets the soonest he could.

In 2016, Hashmi launched, The Kiss of Life: How a Superhero and My Son Defeated Cancer, a memoir co-written by him with Bilal Siddiqi, based on his son's journey against cancer. Its foreword was written by Akshay Kumar, with whom he would star seven years later in Selfiee.

== In the media ==
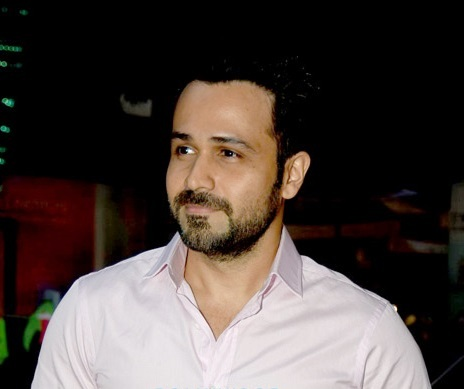
Hashmi at an event in 2015

In Rediff.com's "Top Bollywood Actors" list, Hashmi was placed 9th in 2005. In the Times' 50 Most Desirable Men list, he ranked 41st in 2011 and 26th in 2013. Hashmi appeared in the Eastern Eye's "Sexiest Asian Men" of 2012 at 16th position.

== In pop culture ==
A dialogue in season 1 of The Ba***ds of Bollywood (2025) spoken by Raghav Juyal referencing Hashmi went viral on the social media, becoming an internet phenomenon:

“Akha Bollywood ek taraf, Emraan Hashmi ek taraf.” (All of Bollywood on one side, Emraan Hashmi on the other).

== Awards and nominations ==
Year	Film	Award	Category	Result	Ref.
2005	Murder	Screen Awards	Best Villain	Nominated	
2007	Gangster	Filmfare Awards	Best Performance in a Negative Role	Nominated	
2007	Gangster	IIFA Awards	Best Performance in a Negative Role	Nominated	
2011	Once Upon a Time in Mumbaai	Filmfare Awards	Best Supporting Actor	Nominated	
2011	Once Upon a Time in Mumbaai	Screen Awards	Best Villain	Nominated	
2011	Once Upon a Time in Mumbaai	Zee Cine Awards	Best Supporting Actor	Nominated	
2011	Once Upon a Time in Mumbaai	Stardust Awards	Best Actor in an Ensemble Cast	Nominated	
2011	Once Upon a Time in Mumbaai	IIFA Awards	Best Supporting Actor	Nominated	
2011	Once Upon a Time in Mumbaai	IIFA Awards	Best Performance in a Negative Role	Nominated	
2011	Once Upon a Time in Mumbaai	Producers Guild Film Awards	Best Actor in a Supporting Role	Nominated	
2011	Once Upon a Time in Mumbaai	Producers Guild Film Awards	Best Actor in a Negative Role	Nominated	
2012	Murder 2	Stardust Awards	Best Actor – Thriller/Action	Nominated	
2012	Murder 2	Producers Guild Film Awards	Best Actor in a Leading Role	Nominated	
2012	The Dirty Picture	IIFA Awards	Best Supporting Actor	Nominated	
2012	The Dirty Picture	Producers Guild Film Awards	Best Supporting Actor	Nominated	
2013	Jannat 2	Stardust Awards	Best Actor – Thriller/Action	Nominated	
2013	Shanghai	Filmfare Awards	Best Supporting Actor	Nominated	
2013	Shanghai	Screen Awards	Best Supporting Actor	Nominated	
2013	Shanghai	Stardust Awards	Best Actor – Thriller/Action	Nominated	
2024	Tiger 3	Filmfare Awards	Best Supporting Actor	Nominated	

== Bibliography ==
Hashmi, Emraan; Siddiqi, Bilal (11 April 2016). The Kiss of Life: How a Superhero and My Son Defeated Cancer. Penguin Books. ISBN 9789385890925.

== See also ==
- List of Indian film actors
