= Aashish Singh =

Indian film producer

- Born: Mumbai, Maharashtra, India
- Occupation: Film producer

Aashish Singh (born in Mumbai) is an Indian film producer. He was previously the head of production at Yash Raj Films, a film studio in India.

== Career ==
He has experience across content creation, production, distribution and monetization. He has held executive positions in companies in both North (Yashraj Films, Balaji Telefilms) and South India (Lyca Productions) as well as with an OTT service (Netflix). He was the CEO at Lyca Productions, a production house producing films in Tamil and Hindi. He was earlier Director, Original Film at Netflix and briefly was the CEO of Motion Pictures at Balaji Telefilms. He is currently a producer at Red Chillies Entertainment. He was previously the Vice President at Yash Raj Films, where he was also an executive producer for all films produced there. Films he produced include Chak De India, Tiger Zinda Hai, Sultan, Hichki, Dhoom 3, Dhoom 2, Ek Tha Tiger, Jab Tak Hai Jaan, and Band Bajaa Baaraat.

Singh has also produced Ek Tha Tiger, Dhoom 2, Jab Tak Hai Jaan, Rab Ne Bana Di Jodi, New York and Band Baaja. He has executive produced the most films in the Hindi language and shot films in more than thirty-five countries.He was also involved at lyca Productions during the blockbusters PS 1 and 2 .

== Filmography ==
https://www.imdb.com/name/nm0802088/?ref_=fn_al_nm_1
