= List of Kannada films of 2014 =

This is a list of Kannada language films produced in the Kannada film industry in India in 2014.

- Films are generally released every Friday or Festival Day.
- In addition films can be released on specific festival days.

== Box office collection ==
The highest worldwide gross of 2014
Rank	Title	Production company	Worldwide gross	References
1	Mr. and Mrs. Ramachari	Jayanna Combines	₹50 crore (US$5.2 million)	
2	Maanikya	MNK Movies; Kiccha Creations; Kolla Entertainments	₹35.7 crore (US$3.7 million)	
3	Gajakesari	Jayanna Combines	₹30 crore (US$3.1 million)	
3	Ugramm	Inkfinite Pictures	₹30 crore (US$3.1 million)–₹35 crore (US$3.6 million)	
5	Power***	14 Reels Entertainment	₹15 crore (US$1.6 million) - ₹22 crore (US$2.3 million)	
6	Bahaddur	R.S. Productions	₹10 crore (US$1.0 million)	

== Events ==
- 61st National Film Awards
- Karnataka State Film Awards
- 61st Filmfare Awards South
- 3rd South Indian International Movie Awards (3rd SIIMA)
- Suvarna Film Awards, by Suvarna channel.
- Udaya Film Awards, by Udaya Channel
- Bangalore International Film Festival
- 2nd Kannada international Music Awards (2nd KiMA)
- Bangalore Times Film Awards

== Scheduled releases ==
=== January —June ===
Opening		Title	Director	Cast	Genre	Notes	Ref
J A N	3rd	Gharshane	Dayal Padmanabhan	Malashri, Ashish Vidyarthi, P. Ravi Shankar, Roopika	Action thriller	Remake of Tamil film Yuddham Sei; produced by Shankar Productions	
J A N	3rd	Karnataka Ayodhyapuram	V. Lava	Rakesh Adiga, Nayana Puttaswamy	Political drama	Produced by GK Ventures	
J A N	3rd	Vishwa Vinayaka	V. Swaminathan	Dr. Vasanth, Suma, Ashwini, Rohini Nagaraj, R. N. Sudarshan	Drama		
J A N	10th	Mahasharana Haralayya	B.A. Purushottam	Ramesh Aravind, Sridhar, Ramakrishna, Ramesh Bhat, Raju Dingri, Vikram Udayakumar	Biographical	Produced by Bhagyodaya Cine Creations	
J A N	10th	Nage Bomb	Nagendra Urs	Ravishankar Gowda, Anitha Bhat, Sadhu Kokila	Comedy, drama	Produced by Sai Leela Media Dreams	
J A N	10th	Angaaraka	Srinivas Kaushik	Prajwal Devaraj, Pranitha, Hardika Shetty, Avinash, Muni, Dharma, Veena Venkatesh, Veena Sunder	Action, romance, drama	Produced by SSS Studios	
J A N	16th	Ninnindale	Jayanth C. Paranjee	Puneeth Rajkumar, Erica Fernandes, Thilak Shekar, Brahmanandam, Avinash, Vinayak Joshi	Action, romance, drama	Produced by Hombale Films	
J A N	24th	Dosthi	Anand V	Prithvi, Surya, Prakash, Niharika Malya, Bank Janardhan	Action, drama	Produced by Shobha Movies	
J A N	24th	Navarangi	Umesh	Sadhu Kokila, Roopika, Ravishankar Gowda, Layendra	Comedy	Produced by Veerabhadreshwara Movie Makers	
J A N	31st	Vasundhara	T. S. Nagabharana	Rajesh, Jayanthi, Aishwarya Nag, Sudharani, Jugari Avinash	Drama	Produced by Shruthalaya Films	
J A N	31st	Amanusha	Jayasimha Musuri	Thilak Shekar, Jackie Shroff, Alisha	Mystery, thriller	Produced by Simran Movie Makers	
J A N	31st	Anjada Gandu	Pradeep Raj	Sathish Ninasam, Subhiksha, T. S. Nagabharana	Romantic comedy	Remake of Tamil film Manam Kothi Paravai	
J A N	31st	Darling	Santhu	Yogesh, Muktha	Romance	Produced by S Team Pictures	
F E B	7th	Brahma	R. Chandru	Upendra, Pranitha, Sonu Sood, Nassar, Rangayana Raghu, Shayaji Shinde, Rahul Dev, Girish Karnad	Drama, action	Produced by Mylari Enterprises	
F E B	7th	Nakra	A. Shivakumar	Thriller Manju, Somu, Shobharaj, Spoorthi, Harish Rai, Tennis Krishna	Action, drama	Produced by A. Shivakumar	
F E B	14th	Crazy Star	V. Ravichandran	V. Ravichandran, Priyanka Upendra, Bhavana Rao, Prakash Rai, Akul Balaji, Rangayana Raghu, Naveen Krishna	Romance	Produced by Eshwari Dreams	
F E B	14th	Kwatle	Chandrakala	Paartha, Yagna Shetty	Drama	Produced by Sandalwood Pictures	
F E B	14th	Little Master	Shivaram Krishta	Suchendra Prasad, Shankar Ashwath, Master Chiranjeevi, Shankar Prakash	Children's	90-minute short film	
F E B	21st	Ugramm	Prashanth Neel	Sri Murali, Hariprriya, Thilak Shekar, Atul Kulkarni, Avinash, Jai Jagadish, Padmaja Rao	Action	Blockbuster hit	
F E B	21st	Nan Life Alli	Ramdeep	Anish Tejeshwar, Sindhu Lokanath, Dileep Raj, Ajay Raj, Nikhila, Nagathihalli Chandrashekar, Mithra	Romance, drama	Produced by Nagathihalli Cine Creations and Road Show Cinemas	
F E B	21st	Horror Picture	Vijay Surana	Harish Raj, Roopashri, Kajal Rawat, Patre Ajith, Neha Patil, Vinay Chandra	Horror	Produced by Shanti Vijaya Productions	
F E B	28th	Shivajinagara	P. N. Satya	Duniya Vijay, Parul Yadav, Avinash, Ashish Vidyarthi, Triveni	Action, drama	Produced by Ramu	
F E B	28th	Kalyanamasthu	Mallesh	Raviprakash, Ajith, Pooja Gandhi, Tejaswini Prakash, Avinash, Sithara, Malavika Avinash, Umashree, Bank Janardhan	Drama, family	Produced by Sri Lakshmigiridhar Cine Enterprises	
M A R	7th	Dil Rangeela	Preetham Gubbi	Ganesh, Rachita Ram, Priyanka Rao, Rangayana Raghu, Yamuna, Achyuth Kumar	Romance, drama	Produced by K. Manju Cinemas	
M A R	7th	Chandralekha	N. Om Prakash Rao	Chiranjeevi Sarja, Shanvi Srivastava, Sadhu Kokila, Nagashekar	Comedy, drama, romance, thriller	Remake of Telugu film Prema Katha Chitram; produced by SM Productions	
M A R	7th	Lights Camera Action	Gurudarshan Nagaraj	Balu Nagendra, Archana, Vijay, Chethan	Psychological thriller	Produced by Srinidhi Productions	
M A R	14th	Karoodpathi	P C Ramesh	Komal Kumar, Meera Nandan, Jasmin Bhasin, Malavika, Guruprasad, Vijanath Biradar, Dingri Nagaraj, Jayasri Krishna, Yathiraj	Comedy, drama	Produced by SSS Combines	
M A R	14th	Savaal	Dhananjay Balaji	Prajwal Devaraj, Sona, Muthuraj, Raj K Purohit, Sadhu Kokila, Bullet Prakash, Rekha Das, Raju Talikote, Achyuth Kumar, Tennis Krishna, M. S. Umesh	Action, comedy, drama, romance	Produced by Sri Thirumala Movie Makers	
M A R	14th	Love Show	A Srinivasa Rao	Santosh Kumar, Shishira, Manjunath, Rama Rao, Varma, Ranga, Sadhu Kokila, Bullet Prakash, Tabla Nani, Mandya Ramesh	Romance, drama, comedy	Produced by Sri Prasanna Venkateshwara Creations	
M A R	21st	Rangan Style	Prashanth S.	Pradeep, Kannika Tiwari, Sudeep, Sadhu Kokila, Sharath Lohitashwa, Deepika Das, Tabla Nani, Rekha Das	Romance, drama, comedy, action	Produced by Orange Brothers	
M A R	21st	Manada Mareyalli	Rajeev Nethra	Srikanth (Sriki), Vindya, Ananth Nag, Ajay Rao, Rangayana Raghu, Bullet Prakash, Vishwa, Sandeep	Drama, romance	Produced by Mahesh Anekal	
M A R	21st	Chathurbhuja	Krishna Lekhana	Aarva, Shreya Anchan, Tabla Nani, Baadal, Tennis Krishna, Chandrika, Nagaraj Sharma, Mohan Juneja	Action, thriller, drama	Produced by M B Shivananjappa	
M A R	28th	Ragini IPS	Anand P Raju	Ragini Dwivedi, Petrol Prasanna, Avinash, Bhavya, Kavita Radheshyam	Action	Produced by K. Manju Cinemaas	
M A R	28th	Ulidavaru Kandanthe	Rakshit Shetty	Rakshit Shetty, Kishore, Yagna Shetty, Tara, Achyuth Kumar, Sheetal Shetty, Rishab Shetty	Action, drama	Produced by Suvin Productions	
M A R	28th	Nimbe Huli	Hemanth Hegde	Hemanth Hegde, Komal Jha, Madhurima Tuli, Nivedhitha, Bullet Prakash, Anupam Kher	Comedy, romance	Produced by Mukta Arts	
A P R	4th	Sadagara	Raj Gopi Surya	Shankar Aryan, Yagna Shetty, Sharath Lohitashwa	Romance, drama	Produced by Sri Sowbhagya Cinemas	
A P R	4th	Huchudugaru	RJ Pradeepa	Chetan Chandra, Amit Vishwanath, Prathap Raj, Aditi Rao, P. Ravishankar, Avinash, Tabla Nani	Comedy, drama	Produced by Bhagavathi Pictures	
A P R	11th	Endendu Ninagagi	Mahesh Rao	Vivek, Deepa Sannidhi, Anish Tejeshwar, Sindhu Lokanath	Romance, drama	Remake of Tamil film Engeyum Eppodhum; produced by Sunrise Productions	
A P R	11th	Athi Aparoopa	Dinesh Babu	Prem Kumar, Aindrita Ray, Ananth Nag	Romance	Produced by Ramesh Yadav Movies	
A P R	11th	Maryade	Maharaja	Nagaraj, Ravi Chetan, Harshika Poonachha, Avinash, Suchendra Prasad	Drama	Produced by Kingini Productions	
A P R	18th	Agraja	Sri Nandan	Jaggesh, Darshan, Kamna Jethmalani, Sanjjana, Rangayana Raghu, Hardhika Shetty	Action; drama	Inspired by Telugu film Broker (2010); produced by the Great Indian Movie Creators	
A P R	18th	Kwatle Satisha	Mahesh Rao	Sathish Ninasam, Sonia Gowda, Achyuth Kumar	Comedy	produced by Jayanna Combines	
A P R	18th	Aathma Sakshi	Manu N	Manu, Shwetha Srivatsav, Shankar Bhat, M. S. Umesh	Drama	Based on the short fiction story "Paapa Nivedane"; produced by Manu Entertainment Network	
A P R	25th	December-1	P. Sheshadri	H. G. Dattatreya, Nivedhitha, Santhosh Uppina	Political drama	Winner of National Film Award for Best Feature Film in Kannada; produced by Basanth Productions	
A P R	25th	Veera Pulikeshi	Ma Ba	Bharath Sarja, Rekha Vedavyas, P. Ravi Shankar, Avinash, Raju Talikote, Padma Vaasanthi, Honnavalli Krishna	Action, drama	Produced by Veeresh and Girish	
A P R	25th	Malli	Vishnupriyan	Sujeeth, Disha Poovaiah, Soujanya, Sonia	Romance, drama	Produced by M Narayana Gowda and Lakshmi Pathi	
M A Y	1st	Maanikya	Sudeep	V. Ravichandran, Sudeep, Ramya Krishna, Varalaxmi, Ranya, Ravishankar, Ashok, Avinash, Vijayakumar, Sadhu Kokila, Sharan, Tennis Krishna	Action, thriller, romance, drama, comedy	Remake of Telugu film Mirchi (2013)	
M A Y	9th	Ajith	Mahesh Babu	Chiranjeevi Sarja, Nikki Galrani	Action, thriller, romance, drama, comedy	Remake of Tamil film Paiyaa (2010)	
M A Y	16th	Just Love	S. Nagendra Urs	J. Karthik, Neha Saxena, Achyuth Kumar	Romance, drama	Produced by Raajanna Films	
M A Y	16th	Hara	Devaraj Palan	Vasanth, Pragna, Rahul Dev, Vinaya Prasad, Sadhu Kokila, Avinash, Dharma	Action, drama	Produced by Thulasi Ram; remake of Telugu film Chinnodu (2006)	
M A Y	23rd	Gajakesari	Krishna	Yash, Amulya, Ananth Nag, Shahbaz Khan, Rangayana Raghu, Sadhu Kokila	Action, romance, period	Produced by Jayanna Combines	
M A Y	30th	Savaari 2	Jacob Verghese	Srinagar Kitty, Sruthi Hariharan, Kiran Rao, Girish Karnad, Abbas, Madhurima	Drama	Produced by Jacob Films	
M A Y	31st	Pungi Daasa	M. S. Sreenath	Komal Kumar, Asma Badar, R. N. Sudarshan, Sowcar Janaki, B. C. Patil	Comedy	Produced by SSV Combines	
J U N	6th	Oggarane	Prakash Rai	Prakash Rai, Sneha, Samyuktha Horanadu, Urvashi	Comedy, drama	Remake of Malayalam film Salt N' Pepper; produced by Prakash Rai Productions; trilingual film (Telugu and Tamil)	
J U N	6th	Billion Dollar Baby	Shriya Dinakar	Shriya Dinakar, Suresh Heblikar, Shivadhwaj, Bank Janardhan	Drama	Produced by Dinakar	
J U N	6th	Matthe Satyagraha	B.Shivananda	Yogesh, Neha Patil, H. G. Dattatreya	Drama	B. Shivananda	
J U N	13th	Jamboo Savari	K. C. Venugopal	Prajwal Devaraj, Nikki Galrani, Mithra, Achyuth Kumar, Chaitra Rai	Comedy, romance, drama	Remake of Telugu film Swamy Ra Ra; produced by HPR Entertainment Pvt Ltd.	
J U N	13th	Preethi Geethi Ityaadi	Veerendra	Pawan Wadeyar, Sangeetha Bhat, Vinaya Prasad, Rangayana Raghu	Comedy, romance	Produced by Yogaraj Movies, Fantasy Screens	
J U N	13th	24 Carat	S. Umesh	Virat, Pooja, Rishikumar, Rangayana Raghu, Shobharaj	Drama	Produced by Chowdeshwari Cine Chitralaya	
J U N	13th	Gargar Mandala	Ravi Basrur	Adarsh, Shemitha, Omguru, Vijay Basrur	Drama	Produced by Inkfinet Pictures	
J U N	20th	Drishya	P. Vasu	V. Ravichandran, Navya Nair, Prabhu, Asha Sarath, Achyuth Kumar, Suchendra Prasad	Family, drama, thriller	Remake of Malayalam film Drishyam; produced by E4 Entertainment	
J U N	20th	Typical Kailas	B. N. Mallika	Srujan Lokesh, Vrinda Pavana, Om Prakash Rao	Comedy, romance	Produced by Sri Kaivalyaadevi Combines	
J U N	20th	Love Is Poison	Nandan Prabhu	Rajesh, Shruthi Raj, Sadhu Kokila	Romance	Produced by Akash Enterprises	
J U N	27th	Jai Lalitha	Pon Kumaran	Sharan, Disha Pandey, Aishwarya Devan, Ravishankar Gowda, Harish Raj	Comedy	Remake of Malayalam film Mayamohini; produced by Indira Productions	
J U N	27th	Paru Wife of Devadas	Kiran Govi	Srinagar Kitty, Soundarya Jayamala, Neha Patil, V. Manohar	Comedy, romance	Produced by Harshini Productions	

=== July — December ===
Opening		Title	Director	Cast	Genre	Notes	Ref
J U L	4th	Rose	Sahana Murthy H.S.	Ajay Rao, Shravya, Chandrashekar, Sai Kumar, Sadhu Kokila, Bullet Prakash, Raju Talikote, Sudha Belawadi, Pavithra Lokesh	Romance, drama	Produced by Sri Bhyraveshwara Film Planet	
J U L	4th	Jasmine.5	V. Krishna	Mohan Kumar, Navya, Maanasa, Doddanna, Avinash, Bhavya, Girija Lokesh, Padmaja Rao	Drama	Produced by Bhavyasmi Movie Creations	
J U L	4th	Makkale Maanikya	Kodlu Ramakrishna	Shivadwaj, Niharika, Amogh Hande, Ramesh Bhat, Lakshya, Arhan Jai, Saina, Tia, Kari Subbu	Children, family	Produced by Sri Banashankeri Combines	
J U L	11th	Sachin! Tendulkar Alla	Mohan	Master Snehith, Suhasini Maniratnam, Venkatesh Prasad, Sudharani, Javagal Srinath	Sports, frama	Produced by A.N.S Productions	
J U L	11th	Aakramana	Prashanth Kumar	Raghu Mukherjee, Daisy Shah, Shilpi Sharma, Makrand Deshpande, Avinash	Horror, thriller	First 3D horror movie in Kannada	
J U L	11th	Sri Guru Thipperudraswamy Pavada	B Shivanand	B. C. Patil, M. S. Umesh, Arun, Dingri Nagaraj, Kote Nagaraj	Biographical, drama	Produced by Mantralaya Productions	
J U L	25th	Bahuparak	Suni	Srinagar Kitty, Meghana Raj, Bhavana Rao, Rakshit Shetty	Romantic comedy	Produced by Suvin Cinemas	
A U G	1st	Aaryan	D.Rajendra Babu; Chi. Gurudutt	Shivarajkumar, Ramya, Raghu Mukherjee, Archana Gupta, Sharath Babu, Sumithra, Bullet Prakash	Sports, drama	Produced by Dreamweaver Entertainment	
A U G	1st	Miss Mallige	Krishna	Ranjan Shetty, Roopa Nataraj	Erotic thriller	Produced by Chamundeshwari Studios	
A U G	8th	143 Nooranalavathmuru	Chandrakantha	Chandrakantha, Kavitha Bist	Romance	Produced by E=mc2 Motion Pictures	
A U G	8th	Panganama	Gururaj	Sadhu Kokila, Gururaj, Ithi Acharya, Akshata Rao, Doddanna	Comedy	Produced by Entertainment Guru	
A U G	8th	Baasu Ade Hale Kathe	Shaan Ali	Shaan Ali, Shobhina, Kavya	Drama	Produced by Shri Shasta Movie Makers	
A U G	15th	Adyaksha	Nanda Kishore	Sharan, Raksha, P. Ravi Shankar, Ramesh Bhat, Chikkanna	Comedy, drama	Remake of Tamil film Varuthapadatha Valibar Sangam; produced by Shree Shankar Movies	
A U G	15th	Gandhiji Kanasu	Ramesh S Paravi Naikar	Ramesh, Roopika, M.N Lakshmi Devi, Honnavalli Krishna, Rekha Das, Bank Janardhan	Drama	Produced by Sri Chowdeshwari Films	
A U G	28th	Power ***	K. Madesh	Puneeth Rajkumar, Trisha Krishnan, Kelly Dorjee, Prabhu, Thilak Shekar, Rangayana Raghu	Action	Remake of Telugu film Dookudu; produced by 14 Reels Entertainment	
S E P	5th	Thirupathi Express	Pon Kumaran	Sumanth Shailendra, Kriti Kharbanda, Sadhu Kokila, Ashok	Comedy, drama	Remake of Telugu film Venkatadri Express; produced by Shailendra Productions	
S E P	5th	Ingale Maarga	Vishal Raj	Suchendra Prasad, Shivani, Roopika, Shankar Ashwath, Ramesh Pandit	Drama		
S E P	12th	Paramashiva	Mahesh Babu	V. Ravichandran, Saranya Mohan, Sakshi Shivanand, Vijay Raghavendra, Rekha Vedavyas, Srujan Lokesh	Family drama	Remake of Tamil film Samudhiram; produced by Anaji Nagaraj	
S E P	12th	Nenapideya	S. K. Srinivas	Shravanth Rao, Khushi Shah, Naveen Krishna, Shobharaj	Horror, thriller	Produced by Om Visions	
S E P	12th	Pandya	Devu	Chandru, Suku, Spoorthi, Manasi	Romantic drama	Produced by Kalabhairava Arts	
S E P	19th	Super Ranga	Sadhu Kokila	Upendra, Kriti Kharbanda, Raghu Mukherjee, Doddanna	Action, drama	Remake of Telugu film Kick; produced by K Manju Cinemaas	
S E P	26th	Doodh Sagar	Samuel Tony	Akshay, Deepika Das, Ramya Barna, Sumithra, Neenasam Ashwath	Romance, drama	Produced by Chamundeshwari Studio and Lab	
O C T	2nd	Simhadri	Shivamani	Duniya Vijay, Soundarya Jayamala, Aishwarya, Ramesh Bhat	Action, drama	Produced by Mega Hit Films	
O C T	3rd	Bahaddur	Chethan Kumar	Dhruva Sarja, Radhika Pandit	Romance, action	Produced by RS Productions	
O C T	10th	Usiriginta	Soorya Kiran	Soorya Kiran, Esther Noronha	Romance, drama	Produced by E K Enterprises	
O C T	10th	Gante Ondu	Murali	Vinay, Suma	Horror	Produced by Ashwini Enterprises	
O C T	17th	Neenade Naa	Kandhas	Prajwal Devaraj, Priyanka Kandwal, Ankitha Maheshwari, Doddanna, Avinash	Romance, action	Produced by Dynamic Visions	
O C T	24th	Namaste Madam	R. Raghuraj	Srinagar Kitty, Ragini Dwivedi, Nikesha Patel, Nikita Thukral, Sadhu Kokila	Romance, drama	Remake of Telugu film Missamma; produced by RG Pictures	
O C T	24th	Fair & Lovely	Raghuram	Prem Kumar, Shwetha Srivatsav	Romance, drama	Produced by Jade Plant Ventures	
O C T	31st	Belli	Mussanje Mahesh	Shivarajkumar, Kriti Kharbanda, Vinod Prabhakar, Prashanth, Adi Lokesh, Deepak	Drama, action	Produced by Yashaswini Cine Creations	
O C T	31st	Ee Dil Helide Nee Bekantha	T. M. Srinivasa	Jugari Avinash, Shree Shruti	Drama, romance	Produced by Sai Krishna Movies	
O C T	31st	Jaggi	Raju	Sunil Raj, Ahana, Neethu, Sandeep	Drama	Produced by Abhinandan Productions	
N O V	7th	Abhimanyu	Arjun Sarja	Arjun Sarja, Simran Kapoor, Surveen Chawla, Rahul Dev	Action	Trilingual film released as Jaihind 2 in Tamil and Telugu; produced by Sri Ram Films International	
N O V	14th	Central Jail	J. Balaram	Srikanth, Gamya, Sharath Lohitashwa, Vinaya Prasad, Rajesh, Neenasam Ashwath	Action	Produced by Sri Productions	
N O V	20th	Ambareesha	Mahesh Sukhadhare	Darshan, Ambareesh, Priyamani, Rachita Ram, Umashree, Kelly Dorjee, Sumalatha	Action, drama	Produced by Sukhadhare Productions	
N O V	28th	Namo Boothatma	Murali	Komal Kumar, Iswarya Menon, Nikita Thukral, Gayathri Iyer, Harish Raj, Ali, Anaswara Kumar	Horror, comedy	Remake of Tamil film Yaamirukka Bayamey; produced by RS Infotainment Pvt Ltd	
N O V	28th	Love in Mandya	Arasu Anthare	Sathish Ninasam, Sindhu Lokanath	Romance	Produced by Sri Venkateshwara Krupa Entertainers	
N O V	28th	Huccha Venkat	Huccha Venkat	Huccha Venkat, Kavitha, R. N. Sudarshan, Ramesh Bhat	Drama		
D E C	5th	Software Ganda	Venkatesh	Jaggesh, Nikita Thukral, Jayaprakash Shetty, Srinath, Sakshi Agarwal	Comedy	Remake of Malayalam film My Boss; produced by Sri Marikamba Films	
D E C	5th	Pyar Ka Gol Gumbaz	Dhanush	Dhanush, Poornima	Romance	Produced by VVM Cinemas	
D E C	5th	Ka	Sai Krishna	Sharath, Shine, Manu, Madhukar, Siddartha, Mahesh, Ajith, Raghuram, Sri, Vishal, Sundeep, Deepak, Sullan, Vikram, Mounish, Namratha, Anusha, Pavitra, Pallavi, Deepa, Nayina, Deepthi	Anthology	Produced by Sai Geetha Movies	
D E C	5th	Baanaadi	Nagaraj Kote	Praful Vishwakarma, H. G. Dattatreya, Rajesh Nataranga	Children's	Produced by Dhruthi Cinema	
D E C	12th	Jai Bajarang Bali	Ravi Verma Gubbi	Ajay Rao, Sindhu Lokanath, Ananth Nag, Shruthi Naidu, Adi Lokesh	Romance Drama	Produced by Harmonium Reeds	
D E C	12th	Naanu Hemanth Avalu Sevanthi	Sudhakar Bannanje	Rajaneesh, Lekha Chandra, Vijesh Shetty	Romance, comedy	Produced by Snehakripa Movies	
D E C	19th	Haggada Kone	Dayal Padmanabhan	Naveen Krishna, Suchendra Prasad, H. G. Dattatreya, Srinivasa Murthy, Sihi Kahi Geetha	Crime, drama	Produced by Veerabhadreshwara Films	
D E C	19th	Chirayu	'Orata' Prashanth	Prashanth, Shubha Poonja, Om Prakash Rao, Avinash	Action	Produced by Cine Creations	
D E C	19th	Kolaahala	Bhaskar	Kuri Sunil, Murali, Prithviraj, Chetan, Dhaanvi Kote, Kaamna Singh, Poornima Gowda	Drama	Produced by Sao Vipan Ganda	
D E C	19th	Sorry Kane	Roopesh Raj	Roopesh Raj, Charan Raj, Archana	Romance	Produced by Director Dream Creations	
D E C	25th	Mr. and Mrs. Ramachari	Santhosh Anandram	Yash, Radhika Pandit	Romance, drama	Produced by Jayanna Combines	
D E C	25th	Jothi alias Kothiraj	Sebastien David	Jyothiraj, Aishani Shetty, Deepika Das, Ramesh Bhat	Drama	Produced by V G Films	

== Notable deaths ==
Month	Date	Name	Age	Sex	Profession	Notable work
February	13	Balu Mahendra	74	Male	Director, cinematographer	Kokila • Pallavi Anu Pallavi
February	28	C. R. Simha	72	Male	Actor, director	Samskara • Bara • Parameshi Prema Prasanga • Kakanakote • Maathaad Maathaadu Mallige • Shikaari • Simhasana • Ashwamedha • Angayalli Apsare • Nee Bareda Kadambari • Rayaru Bandaru Mavana Manege • Nee Thanda Kanike • Indina Ramayana • Ranaranga
March	16	Ravindranath	63	Male	Director, actor	Aparanji • Henne Ninageke Ee Bandhana • Veerappan • Thayi Kotta Thali • Lancha Lancha Lancha • Sangliana 3 • Nammoora Huduga • Tappida Taala • Jogaiah • Prem Adda • Bhaktha Siriyala • Ganda Hendathi • I Love You
March	19	V. Sanath Kumar	43	Male	Producer, director	Eddelu Manjunatha • other documentary films
April	5	Hanumantha Kattimani	35	Male	Distributor	Chatrapathi
April	7	V. K. Murthy	90	Male	Cinematographer	Hoovu Hannu
May	8	Raghuveer	46	Male	Actor	Chaitrada Premanjali • Shrungara Kavya • Kaveri Theeradalli • Uyyale • Naviloora Naidile • August 15
June	22	Rama Narayan	65	Male	Director	Bhairavi • Shambhavi • Dakshayini • Kalpana • Bhuvaneshwari • Jagadeeshwari • Bombat Car
July	20	Dhandapani	71	Male	Actor	Super
December	23	K. Balachander	84	Male	Director, producer, screenwriter	Benkiyalli Aralida Hoovu • Sundara Swapnagalu • Eradu Rekhegalu • Mugila Mallige
