= Godfather (2012 film) =

2012 film by Sethu Sriram

- Promotional poster
- Directed by: Sethu Sriram
- Screenplay by: K. S. Ravikumar
- Story by: KS Ravikumar, Rohit Rao
- Based on: Varalaru (Tamil)
- Produced by: K. Manju
- Starring: Upendra; Soundarya Jayamala; Catherine Tresa
- Cinematography: Sethu Sriram
- Music by: Score: Rajesh Ramanath; Songs: A. R. Rahman (Reused from Varalaru, except 1 song)
- Production company: K Manju Cinemas
- Release date: 27 July 2012
- Country: India
- Language: Kannada
- Budget: ₹4.5 crore
- Box office: ₹7 crore

Godfather is a 2012 Indian Kannada-language action-drama film directed by cinematographer-turned-director Sethu Sriram starring Upendra in a triple role as a father and his two sons, alongside Soundarya Jayamala and Catherine Tresa.

The film is remake of the 2006 Tamil filmVaralaru. A. R. Rahman, who composed music for the original Tamil version, is the composer of the songs, with all songs except one being re-used from the original. Rajesh Ramanath composed the background score.

The film was released on 27 July 2012 and opened to a large number of highly positive reviews from the critics. Upendra's performance of a Bharatha Natyam dancer and as an old man bound to his wheelchair was highly acclaimed by critics and is considered one of the best performances of his career. Godfather performed moderately well at the box office and was declared a "blockbuster".

== Plot ==
Shivasagar, a crippled multi-millionaire, has a son, Vijay who is playful and irresponsible. To teach him a lesson, he sends Vijay to Bhamapura to help the poor. Vijay doesn't want to go, but a local pizza restaurateur convinces Vijay and his friends that the village is one big brothel. In reality, Bhamapura is a sacred village and the restaurateur had purposely deceived Vijay and his friends. Divya and her classmates also visit the village. They come for their social activity course to improve the village's health and hygiene. A large building is reserved for him and the girls are asked to stay in the poor families' houses. Vijay and his friends arrive and start to woo the girls, whom they mistake for Bhamapura's prostitutes. When Divya discovers their plan, she and her friends decide to teach Vijay and his friends a lesson.

Vijay and his friends are wooed by Divya and the other girls. They are led to separate rooms where the girls inject a serum that makes them itch all over. They leave, screaming and scratching. Vijay tells Divya to leave her profession and offers to save her honour by marrying her in the village temple the next day. Divya doesn't come, but Vijay and his friends happen to see her leaving on a bus bearing the name of the girls' college, revealing that they have been duped. When Vijay returns home, Shivsagar discovers that his son has fallen in love. With his influence, Vijay and Divya get engaged. Later, Vijay goes to Divya's house in a drunken state. Her family prevent him from talking to her. This eventually leads to a fight. Vijay then goes to Divya's cousin's house to meet Divya and apologise for his behaviour but suddenly attempts to rape Divya's cousin. Then on the same day at night, Vijay tries to kill Shivasagar, but is luckily stopped by Ko Thanda and is stabbed by Vijay. Disappointed with Vijay's behaviour, Shivasagar sends Vijay to a therapist.

Here enters Ajay, Vijay's doppelganger. Assuming Vijay's identity, he had taken money from the bank, got drunk and went to Divya's place and attempted to rape Divya's cousin. Ajay hates Shivasagar for leaving him and his mentally-challenged mother (Catherine Tresa). Later, Divya manages to sneak into Vijay's room in the hospital and believes his explanation that he is innocent. She leaves and shortly afterwards, Ajay appears, smuggles and dumps Vijay out of the hospital, takes over his identity and goes to kill Shivasagar. The father notices that it's not his son and gets out of his wheelchair to defend himself. Vijay arrives at the scene, surprised that his father is able to walk and demands an explanation.

Shivasagar tells him that he was a dancer who behaved effeminately due to dancing. His mother had arranged for Shivasagar to marry her friend's daughter (Ajay's mother). He agreed but the girl rejected Shivasagar for being too feminine and insults him in front of the wedding crowd. Unable to bear the embarrassment, Shivasagar's mother died on the spot. Shivasagar, enraged, raped the girl, a deed that resulted in her becoming pregnant. The doctor refused to give her an abortion and so Vijay was born. Shivasagar takes his child from her mother saying the child would be the only hope of his life. Shivasagar says he is ignorant of Ajay's existence and the reason for his resemblance to them.

Ajay escapes and threatens Vijay and Divya's wedding. Shivasagar attempts to stop him when Ajay's grandmother arrives and explains that Ajay is also Shivasagar's son and Vijay's twin and that Ajay's mother went mad when Ajay was about to get hit by a lorry. Ajay realises his mistake. He wants Shivasagar to shoot him, but the police misunderstand and think that Ajay is pointing a gun at Shivasagar and they fire at Ajay. Shivasagar intervenes and is shot instead. Ajay accepts Shivasagar's apology and is then arrested. Ajay's mother does not accept food from anyone, until Vijay comes dressed up as Ajay and feeds her. The film ends with Vijay stating that Shivasagar is the godfather of the family.

== Cast ==
- Upendra in a triple role as:
  - Shivasagar (Father)
  - Vijay and Ajay (Sons)
- Soundarya Jayamala as Divya
- Catherine Tresa as Vaani, Shiva Sagar's wife
- Ramesh Bhat as Ko-Dhanda (Old man's servant)
- Hema Chaudhary as Shiva's mother
- Sihi Kahi Chandru as Restaurant Manager
- Padmaja Rao as Divya's Friend
- Keerthiraj as Divya's brother
- Satyajit as Ajay's Guardian
- Kuri Prathap as Vijay's Friend
- Shweta as Divya's Friend
- Rekha Das as Divya's Teacher
- Sudha Belawadi as Sujatha
- Siddaraj Kalyankar as Divya's father
- G.B Rangashasai
- Suchitra as Divya's aunt
- Shivashankar as Shivasagar's master
- Bhumika Chawla in a special appearance

== Production ==
The film went on floors on 28 April 2009 in Bangalore at Abbaiah Studios. Producer K. Manju first roped in Upendra and then went on to cast Simran and the daughter actress Jayamala, Soundarya, but Simran opted out after becoming pregnant. Another budding actress, Catherine Tresa was also brought in to reprise the role originally played by Kanika Subramaniam in the Tamil version. It was P. C. Sreeram who insisted his longtime friend A. R. Rahman compose the music for the movie.

Initial reports wrongly reported that cinematographer P. C. Sreeram would be the director of the film. Sethu Sriram, who had apprenticed under the veteran cinematographer and independently shot films like Dil Se.., Kuch Kuch Hota Hai, Desires of the Heart, Shakti: The Power, Tere Naam, Thanmathra, Annavaram, Money Hai Toh Honey Hai, Tere Sang, Wanted, Milenge Milenge, Samurai, The Terrorist, Halo, Priyasakhi andOh My God!, directed the film.

== Music ==
The soundtrack album consists of songs by A. R. Rahman. The background score of the film was composed by Rajesh Ramanath. The soundtrack consists of eight songs, with all of the compositions, except one, retained from the Tamil version. "Alapane" was the only fresh song composed for the Kannada version. The audio launch was held in a grand manner in Chancery Hotel, Bengaluru on 13 June 2012. The soundtrack album became very popular, and received highly positive critical reviews and met with many positive responses from audiences. Rahman got his first nomination in Kannada, by getting nominated in the Best Music Director category in the 2nd SIIMA Awards.

== Release ==
As Upendra played lead roles in two films Godfather and Katari Veera Surasundarangi, the producers of those films had discussions over the back-to-back release of two films with the same lead actor. As per reports, the producer pushed the release date of Godfather to 3 May 2012 from 24 Dec 2010. However, the mounting spar of the tussle over which film must release first was left unsolved. KFCC, part of South Indian Film Chamber of Commerce intervened the matter and stated that the film getting censored first would be released first. The producer of the film stated the production to be continuing for over 12 months and naturally wanted Godfather to release before Katari Veera Surasundarangi. The release was rescheduled in the second week of May 2012. However, after several rounds of discussions, avoiding clashes with Upendra's other films, the release was confirmed for the second week of June 2012 as censoring was pending. The production house was unsatisfied with promotional activities done before release of the film, and the release date was pushed to 27 July 2012.

== Reception ==
=== Critical response ===
Godfather opened to a large number of highly positive reviews from the critics upon release. DNA gave the film 4 out of 5 stars and stated, "Upendra has once again proved his mettle as the 'Real Star' in Sandalwood with this film. This is one of those films that can be watched by anyone - be it mass or class." The Times of India gave the film 3.5 out of 5 stars and stated, "A brilliant piece of directorial work by S Sriram who has chosen a serious family sentimental story and given it an excellent dramatic treatment which caters to all age groups. It's Upendra's extraordinary triple role that carries the entire story forward. Upendra stands out among others for his amazing performance from the beginning to the end. Enjoy a brilliant Bharatanatyam by Upendra, a highlight of the movie." S Shyam Prasad, entertainment editor of Bangalore Mirror, gave 3.5 stars out of 5 praising Upendra's performance in the flashbacks and stated that "Upendra alone makes this film a worthwhile watch. He ups the film several notches higher. The film is worth a watch and is a total entertainer." A Sharadhaa from The New Indian Express wrote "Director Sriram taking the cameraman's role has done a good job at the editing desk, not giving much room to find faults. This is definitely a treat for family goers as Godfather does not have any dialogues with ‘double meaning’, which is otherwise the case with most of the movies starring Upendra". Srikanth Srinivasa from Rediff.com scored the film at 2 out of 5 stars and says "Rajesh Ramanath's background score is below average. A R Rahman has used some of his rejected tunes for his songs in this movie. Sriram's direction is just average. Watch this movie if you are an Upendra fan". Vijayasarathy Rajapur from News18 India wrote "Overall 'Godfather' is a clear winner because of Upendra's striking performance. Go and watch it for Upendra's awesome performance as a Bharathanatyam dancer".

=== Box office ===
Godfather witnessed a tremendous opening at the box office on 27 July 2012 in more than 120 screens across Karnataka. The film opened to 80 to 90% occupancy levels all over Karnataka on its release day. On Friday, it raked in above ₹ 10 million with an average of 85% occupancy in most of the theaters. However, the collections showed a minor drop on Saturday and it managed to earn around ₹ 8.5 million. However, the movie picked up well on Sunday and collected more than ₹ 10.5 million and ended the weekend with an impressive gross of ₹ 29 million. According to distributor Prasad, the film recovered more than half of its budget by collecting almost ₹ 30 million during its opening weekend. Producer K Manju announced that the film earned ₹ 46 million in its first week. The film grossed more than ₹ 75 million in two weeks and fetched a net share of more than ₹ 56 million for the distributor.

The film completed 50 days in release and did moderate business overall, bringing sufficient returns for the distributor through satellite rights and fetched a profit of ₹ 30 million for the producer. The film was declared a "Super Hit". However, the film's box office performance was well expectations and near the expected blockbuster success.

=== Accolades ===
The film has won & received nominations for the following awards since its release:

2013 6th Suvarna Film Awards 2012 (India)

- Won - Suvarna Film Award for Best Debut Actress – Soundarya Jayamala

2013 Filmfare Awards South

- Nomination – Filmfare Award for Best Supporting Actress – Catherine Tresa

2013 Bangalore Times of India Awards

- Nomination – Bangalore Times of India Award for Best Actor in a Negative Role – Upendra
- Nomination – Bangalore Times of India Award for Best Debut Actress – Soundarya Jayamala

2013 Udaya Film Awards

- Nomination – Best Music Director – A. R. Rahman

2013 SIIMA Awards

- Nomination – Best Music Director – A. R. Rahman

2013 South Scope Awards

- Nomination – South Scope Award for best Album of the Year – A. R. Rahman
- Nomination – South Scope Award for Best Album (Listener's Choice) – A. R. Rahman
