= Bhumika Chawla =

Indian actress (born 1978)

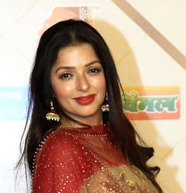
- Chawla in 2024
- Born: Rachna Chawla; 21 August 1978 (age 48); New Delhi, India
- Occupation: Actress
- Years active: 2000–present
- Spouse: Bharath Thakur (m. 2007)
- Children: 1

Bhumika Chawla (born Rachna Chawla; 21 August 1978) is an Indian actress known primarily for her work in Telugu , along with a few Hindi, Tamil and Malayalam films. She made her acting debut with the film Yuvakudu (2000) and subsequently became one of the leading female stars of Telugu cinema during the early 2000s. Her notable films include Kushi (2001), Okkadu (2003), Simhadri (2003), Tere Naam (2003), Jai Chiranjeeva (2005), Sillunu Oru Kaadhal (2006), Badri (2001), and Middle Class Abbayi (2017).

== Early life ==
Chawla was born on 21 August 1978 to a Punjabi Hindu family in New Delhi, India and completed her schooling there. Her father is a retired Army officer. Bhumika has two siblings, an elder brother and an elder sister.

She moved to Mumbai in 1997 and started her career with television advertisements and Hindi music video albums. She appeared in the Zee TV series Hip Hip Hurray and Star Best Sellers – Fursat Mein.

== Career ==
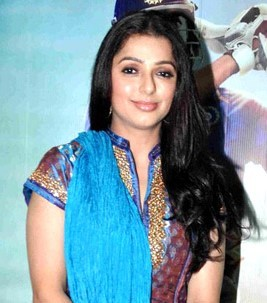
Chawla in 2016

Chawla's career began in 1998 with her first music video, "Yuhi Kabhi Mila Karo" performed by Zubeen Garg, which was her first on-screen appearance. She made her debut in the Telugu film industry, starring in the feature film Yuvakudu (2000) alongside actor Sumanth. Her second release, Kushi (2001), in which she starred opposite Pawan Kalyan was a box office success, winning her the Filmfare Award for Best Actress – Telugu following which she acted in several films in Telugu, including Okkadu (2003) opposite Mahesh Babu and Simhadri (2003). Meanwhile, she made her debut in the Tamil film industry as well, starring in the film Badri (2001) opposite actor C. Joseph Vijay, which was followed by her second Tamil film Roja Kootam (2002).

After a number of critically and commercially successful films in the South, Chawla starred in her first Bollywood film, Tere Naam (2003), alongside Salman Khan. The film was one of the year's highest grossers. and won the Best Debut trophy at the Zee Cine Awards ceremony.

Subsequently, she starred in a number of Hindi films including Run (2004), Dil Ne Jise Apna Kahaa (2004), Silsiilay (2005) and Dil Jo Bhi Kahey... (2005). She returned to Telugu, acting in the films Naa Autograph (2004) and Jai Chiranjeeva (2005).

In 2006, Chawla appeared in the Tamil film Sillunu Oru Kaadhal, alongside real-life couple Surya and Jyothika which became a big hit worldwide. The same year she appeared in the Hindi film Family - Ties of Blood and the Telugu film Mayabazar. Following this, she acted in the Hindi film Gandhi, My Father as Gulab Gandhi and played the title roles in the Telugu films Satyabhama and Anasuya, a crime thriller.

In 2008, she made her debut in the Punjabi film industry, starring in Yaariyan, opposite Gurdas Maan, following which she debuted in Malayalam as well, starring in Bhramaram alongside Mohanlal. Later she was seen in Yagam and Thangar Bachan's Kalavadiya Pozhudugal. She also appeared in the 2016 movie M.S. Dhoni: The Untold Story. She portrayed the character of MS Dhoni's sister in the movie.

Chawla acted in the sports action movie Seetimaarr (2021). In 2024, she starred in the comedy-drama Brother, directed by M. Rajesh. The film was released in theaters on October 31, 2024, and later premiered on the ZEE5 platform on November 29, 2024.

== Personal life ==
Chawla married her long-time boyfriend and yoga teacher, Bharat Thakur, on 21 October 2007 at Devlali, Nashik in a Gurdwara. The couple have a son.

== Filmography ==
Key
†	Denotes films that have not yet been released

List of Bhumika Chawla film credits
Year	Title	Role	Language	Notes
2000	Yuvakudu	Sindhu	Telugu	
2001	Badri	Janaki	Tamil	
2001	Kushi	Madhumitha / Bujji	Telugu	
2001	Snehamante Idera	Yuvarani Padmini	Telugu	
2002	Roja Kootam	Mano	Tamil	
2002	Vasu	Divya	Telugu	
2003	Okkadu	Swapna Reddy	Telugu	
2003	Missamma	Meghana	Telugu	
2003	Simhadri	Indu	Telugu	
2003	Tere Naam	Nirjara Bharadwaj	Hindi	
2003	Aadanthe Ado Type	Surya's lover	Telugu	Special appearance
2004	Run	Jahnvi Choudhry	Hindi	
2004	Samba	Nandu	Telugu	
2004	Naa Autograph	Divya	Telugu	
2004	Dil Ne Jise Apna Kahaa	Dhani	Hindi	
2005	Silsiilay	Zia Rao	Hindi	
2005	Dil Jo Bhi Kahey...	Dr. Gayarti Pandey	Hindi	
2005	Jai Chiranjeeva	Neelima	Telugu	
2006	Sillunu Oru Kaadhal	Ishwarya	Tamil	
2006	Family	Dr. Kavita Bhatia	Hindi	
2006	Mayabazaar	Anupama	Telugu	
2007	Gandhi, My Father	Gulab Gandhi	Hindi	
2007	Satyabhama	Satyabhama	Telugu	
2007	Gangotri	Gangotri	Bhojpuri	
2007	Anasuya	Anasuya	Telugu	
2008	Swagatam	Vidhya KK	Telugu	
2008	Mallepuvvu	Malleshwari "Malli" Kanneganti	Telugu	
2008	Yaariyan	Simran	Punjabi	
2009	Bhramaram	Jaya	Malayalam	
2009	Naa Style Veru	Parvati	Telugu	
2009	Amaravathi	Amaravathi	Telugu	
2010	Yagam	Nandini	Telugu	
2010	Thakita Thakita	Vishali	Telugu	Also producer
2010	Collector Gari Bharya	Indira Gautam	Telugu	
2012	Godfather	Herself	Kannada	Special appearance in the song "Aalapane Mellane"
2013	Buddy	Padma	Malayalam	
2013	Chithirayil Nilachoru	Mentally challenged person	Tamil	Special appearance
2014	Laddu Babu	Madhuri	Telugu	
2014	April Fool	Swapna	Telugu	Cameo
2015	Luv U Alia	Bhoomi	Kannada	
2016	M.S. Dhoni: The Untold Story	Jayanti Gupta	Hindi	
2017	Middle Class Abbayi	Jyothi	Telugu	
2017	Kalavaadiya Pozhuthugal	Jayanthi	Tamil	
2018	U Turn	Maya	Tamil; Telugu	Bilingual film
2018	Savyasachi	Siri	Telugu	
2019	Khamoshi	Mrs. Desai	Hindi	
2019	Kolaiyuthir Kaalam	Mrs. Sawant	Tamil	
2019	Ruler	Niranjana Prasad	Telugu	
2021	Idhe Maa Katha	Lakshmi	Telugu	
2021	Paagal	Prem's deceased mother	Telugu	Cameo
2021	Seetimaarr	Bhumi	Telugu	
2022	Operation Romeo	Chhaya	Hindi	
2022	Sita Ramam	Mrinalini Sharma	Telugu	
2022	Butterfly	Advocate Vaijayanthi	Telugu	Released on Disney+Hotstar
2023	Kannai Nambathey	Kavita / Savita	Tamil	Dual role
2023	Kisi Ka Bhai Kisi Ki Jaan	Gundamaneni Anandini	Hindi	
2024	Brother	Anandhi Aravind	Tamil	
2024	Naam	Pooja	Hindi	Delayed release, Filmed in 2004
2025	School	Anbarasi	Tamil	
2026	Euphoria	Vindhya Vemulapalli	Telugu	
TBA	Kesar Singh	Kesar Singh	Hindi	

=== Television ===
List of Bhumika Chawla television credits
Year	Title	Role	Language	Notes
2018	Bhram	Ankita Paul	Hindi	

=== Music video appearances ===
List of Chawla's music video appearances
Year	Title	Performer(s)	Role	Album	Ref.
1998	"Yuhi Kabhi Mila Karo"	Zubeen Garg	Unnamed	Yuhi Kabhi	
2004	"Maahiya"	Adnan Sami	Unnamed	Teri Kasam	

== Awards and nominations ==
List of Bhumika Chawla awards and nominations
Year	Award	Category	Film	Result	Ref.
2002	49th Filmfare Awards South	Best Actress – Telugu	Kushi	Won	
2003	Nandi Awards	Best Actress	Missamma	Won	
2004	51st Filmfare Awards South	Best Actress – Telugu	Missamma	Nominated	
2003	7th Zee Cine Awards	Best Female Debut	Tere Naam	Won	
2004	Filmfare Award	Filmfare Best Actress Award	Tere Naam	Nominated	
2004	Screen Awards	Best Actress	Tere Naam	Nominated	
2007	54th Filmfare Awards South	Best Supporting Actress – Tamil	Sillunu Oru Kaadhal	Nominated	
2007	Nandi Awards	Special Jury Award	Satyabhama	Won	
2008	55th Filmfare Awards South	Best Actress – Telugu	Anasuya	Nominated	
2008	6th Santosham Film Awards	Best Actress	Anasuya	Won	
2018	65th Filmfare Awards South	Best Supporting Actress – Telugu	Middle Class Abbayi	Nominated	
2018	7th South Indian International Movie Awards	Best Supporting Actress – Telugu	Middle Class Abbayi	Won	
