= Ranya Rao =

Indian actress and model (born 1993)

- Born: Harshavardhini Ranya; 28 May 1993 (age 33); Chikmagalur, Karnataka, India
- Occupations: Actress; Model; Gold Smuggler
- Years active: 2014–2017
- Spouse: Jatin Hukkeri
- Criminal information
- Status: Incarcerated (sentenced on 16 July 2025)
- Conviction: Gold smuggling
- Criminal charges: COFEPOSA case
- Penalty: 1 year in prison

Details
- Date apprehended: 3 March 2025
- Imprisoned at: Bangalore Central Prison

Harshavardhini Ranya (born 28 May 1993), known professionally as Ranya Rao, is an Indian former actress and model, who appeared in Kannada films. She made her debut with the 2014 Kannada film, Maanikya. In 2025, she was convicted and was sentenced a year's imprisonment in the gold smuggling case under the charges of COFEPOSA. She was set to be released on bail after a year on 23 April 2026.

== Early life ==
Harshavardhini Ranya was born on 28 May 1993. She originally hails from the Chikkamagaluru district in Karnataka, India. After completing her schooling in Bangalore, Rao pursued acting with accreditation in acting.

== Career ==
Rao was first signed by actor and director Sudeepa in April 2014 for his directorial Kannada film, Maanikya. She was cast as Manasa in a supporting role, portraying a girl belonging to a rich Indian family and Sudeep's love interest. Her performance received mixed reviews from critics. A. Sharadhaa of The New Indian Express wrote, "Both Ranya and Varalaxmi play their parts well but fail to impress."

In June 2015, Rao signed her second film and first Tamil film, Wagah She was cast opposite Vikram Prabhu, her first as a female lead. In her first release of 2017, a comedy Pataki, in Kannada, she played a journalist Sangeetha, the love interest of a police officer played by Ganesh.

== 2025 gold-smuggling case ==
On 3 March 2025, Ranya Rao, the stepdaughter of Karnataka’s Director General of Police, K. Ramachandra Rao, was arrested by the Directorate of Revenue Intelligence (DRI).

Rao was intercepted at Bengaluru airport after arriving on Emirates flight EK 566 from Dubai. While attempting to pass through the green channel at the airport, the actor claimed that she was not carrying any dutiable goods, gold, or contraband, but a metal detector alerted officers to concealed items. Upon inspection, Rao was found to have wrapped 14.2 kg of 24-karat gold around her waist and calves, with additional pieces hidden in her shoes and pockets. The gold was valued at over ₹12.56 crore.

The DRI had been monitoring her due to her frequent travels, including 27 trips to Dubai in six months prior to her arrest. She initially claimed these trips were for business and photography purposes. The DRI revealed that the gold smuggling operation involved a larger syndicate and that Rao had received assistance from a State Protocol Officer, who was also part of the racket. Rao was apprehended just before exiting the airport. According to DRI officials, Ranya Rao made 52 trips to Dubai between 2023 and March 2025.

She was sent to Bangalore Central Prison for 14 days of judicial custody under the 1962 Customs Act. During questioning, Rao admitted to smuggling gold for the first time. She collected the gold at Dubai Airport from an unidentified man in a white gown, concealed it on her body using adhesive tape, and hid some in her shoes and pockets. Rao confessed to using YouTube videos to plan the smuggling.

A search of her Bengaluru home uncovered ₹2.06 crore in gold jewelry and ₹2.67 crore in cash. Rao also held a UAE Resident Identity Card, and the DRI was investigating hawala money transfers related to her activities.

=== Bail ===
Economic Offences Court in Bengaluru on May 20, 2025 granted default bail to Rao and co-accused Tarun Kondaraju. But Ranya Rao was not released because of the case registered against her under the stringent Conservation of Foreign Exchange and Prevention of Smuggling Activities (COFEPOSA) Act, 1974.

She was lodged at the Bengaluru Central Prison along with two others, Tarun Raju and Sahil Sakaria Jain, who have also been booked under the COFEPOSA Act.

They both were granted bail on two sureties each and ₹2 lakh bond. The court also imposed strict conditions on them stating that they cannot leave the country and must not commit a similar crime. The court issued a stern warning, noting that any breach of these conditions would lead to the cancellation of their bail.

=== Conviction ===
On 16 July 2025, Rao and co-accused Tarun Raju and Sahil Jain were sentenced to one year in prison under the COFEPOSA Act under the charge of gold smuggling. The Advisory Board of COFEPOSA also ruled that she will not be granted bail during the term of her incarceration. The DRI also imposed a fine of ₹ 102 crore on Rao and the co-accused after they were sentenced in the gold smuggling racket. After finishing her sentence, she was set to be released on bail after a year on 23 April 2026.

== Filmography ==
Key
†	Denotes films that have not yet been released

Year	Film	Language	Role	Notes
2014	Maanikya	Kannada	Manasa	Debut movie, credited as Ranya
2016	Wagah	Tamil	Khanum/Kajal	
2017	Pataki	Kannada	Sangeetha	
