= Sethu Sriram =

Indian cinematographer

- Education: BSc Physics; D.F.Tech
- Occupations: Director; Cinematographer; Screenwriter; Art Director
- Years active: 1993 – present

Sethu Sriram is a national award-winning cinematographer, art director and director. He is best known for his national award-winning short film Blindfolded (2000). He has worked in Malayalam, Tamil, Kannada, Telugu and Hindi films. In 2014, he is coming with his first Hindi film SNAFU.

== Personal life ==
Sethu Sriram was born to a Tamil family in Chennai. His father V. Sethuraman and mother S. Nagalaxmi are both professors. Sethu Sriram holds three degrees, B.S.C in Physics, Diploma in Film Technology and Post Graduation in Mass Communication and Journalism.Sethu sriram's wife, Cauvery Sriram is a house wife.Sethu Sriram's son, Kailash Sriram is studying Visual Communication in Loyola Chennai.

== Career ==
Sethu was a long time associate of Santosh Sivan started his career as director of photography, he has shot the films Hindi Shakti (2002), Tere Naam (2003), Wanted (2008), Milenge Milenge (2010) and OMG – Oh My God! (2012). In the Tamil industry he has done films like Saamurai (2002), Aiyyanaar (2010), and in Telugu cinema he has been a part of films like Shri Anjaneyam (2004) and Annavaram (2006). His stint in Malayalam films include names such as Thanmathra (2005) and Metro (2011). Sriram's made his directorial debut with the Kannada film Godfather (2012).

== Filmography ==
As director

Year	Film
2000	Blindfolded (Short Film)
2012	Godfather (Kannada)

As director of photography

Year	Film
1999	Marcara – Malayalam Manorama
2002	Punajani
2002	Samurai
2002	Shakti: The Power
2003	Tere Naam
2004	Sri Anjaneyam
2005	Priyasakhi
2005	Thanmathra
2006	Annavaram
2008	Money Hai Toh Honey Hai
2009	Teree Sang
2009	Wanted
2010	Ayyanaar
2010	Milenge Milenge
2011	Metro
2011	With Love, Delhi!
2012	Godfather
2012	OMG – Oh My God!
2018	Dussehra

2019 Ghe Double

2020 Ghuspaithiya 2021 Jahaan Chaar Yaar

Year	Film
1993	Gandharvam (Assistant Cameraman)
1993	Gardish (Assistant Cameraman)
1994	Pavithram (Assistant cameraman)
1995	Barsat (Assistant cameraman)
1996	Halo (Assistant cameraman)
1996	Kaalapani (Associate cameraman)
1997	Iruvar (Associate cameraman)
1997	Darmiyan (Assistant cameraman)
1998	Dil Se.. (Second unit cinematographer)
1998	Kuch Kuch Hota Hai (Assistant cameraman)
1999	Malli (Assistant cameraman)
2000	Pukar (Assistant cameraman)
2002	Indra (Assistant cameraman)
2010	Vande Mataram

Art director

Year	Film
1998	The Terrorist

== Awards and nominations ==
Year	Award	Category	Film	Result
2000	National Award	Best Short Film	Blindfolded	Won
2000	Mumbai International Film Festival (MIFF)	Best Debut Director	Blindfolded	Won
2003	Cameramen Association	Best Cameraman Award	Samurai	Won
