= Bikram Vicckey Goswami =

Indian music composer (died 2019)

Bikram Vicckey Goswami was an Indian music composer. He studied at Wilson College, Mumbai. Goswami won the Zee Cine Award for best background score for the film Tere Naam. He worked as a background score composer for Dil Ne Jise Apna Kahaa (2004), Dil Maange More (2004), and Paa (2009). He also worked on several advertisements including an Audi A7 advertisement. His father Durga Goswami is the founder of Hotel Luit.

== Discography ==
- Tere Naam (2003)
- Dil Ne Jise Apna Kahaa (2004)
- Dil Maange More (2004)
- Paa (2009)

== Death ==
He died on 12 June 2019 due to stomach cancer. He was diagnosed with cancer one month earlier.
