= Pataki (film) =

2017 film directed by Manju Swaraj

- Theatrical Release poster
- Directed by: Manju Swaraj
- Screenplay by: Manju Swaraj
- Story by: Anil Ravipudi
- Based on: Pataas (2015)
- Produced by: S.V.Babu
- Starring: Ganesh; Saikumar; Sadhu Kokila; Ranya Rao; Ashish Vidyarthi; Priyanka Thimeesh
- Cinematography: Venkatesh Anguraj
- Edited by: N.M.Vishwa
- Music by: Arjun Janya
- Production company: S.V.Productions
- Distributed by: S.V.Films
- Release date: 26 May 2017
- Running time: 140 minutes
- Country: India
- Language: Kannada

Pataki ( transl. Firecracker) is a 2017 Indian Kannada-language action comedy film directed by Manju Swaraj and produced by S. V. Babu under the banner S.V.Productions. The film stars Ganesh and Ranya Rao in the lead roles while Arjun Janya composed the music. The film is a remake of the 2015 Telugu film Pataas.

== Plot ==
Surya is a corrupt IPS officer who gets himself transferred to Bangalore as ACP. He misuses his power to gain monetary benefits in unorthodox methods. During this process, he also encourages a local MP named Rudra Prathap, who has become a headache to Agni, the DGP of Bangalore. Surya happens to be Agni's son, who is angry at the latter as his supposed negligence killed his mother and just born sister. In reality, Agni actually left his wife in the hospital to save several families in a riot. Unaware of this, Surya left Agni and joined an orphanage where he became an IPS officer to seek revenge on his father.

During his life in Bangalore, Kalyan also meets two women; Sangeetha, a journalist, and Manvitha, a deaf-mute philanthropist who works in a coffee shop. He loves Sangeetha and expects her to reciprocate the same only to be rejected by her because of his corrupt nature. Manvitha is killed by Rudra Prathap's son Vicky when she tries to save a techie from being assaulted by him. Surya considered Manvitha as his sister and her death enrages him, so he turns against Rudra Pratap. Rudra Prathap wants to make Vicky a politician while Surya challenges Rudra Prathap to save Vicky from getting arrested. Rudra Prathap manages to kidnap the techie, but with the help of a transgender named Basanti, who is the main witness, Surya arrests Vicky with a non-bailable warrant. He also challenges Rudra Prathap to bring Vicky out of prison within 3 days.

Agni and Surya are united, and Surya's marriage with Sangeetha is approved. On the third day, Rudra Prathap's men kidnap Basanti and Sangeetha. Agni, along with his team, go to the spot to save Basanti. Surya manages to save Sangeetha. Meanwhile, Agni and his team, along with Basanti, are killed by Rudra Prathap and his partners. The next day, Surya and the officers form a plan and make Vicky escape from custody, they track him as he reaches Rudra Prathap's hideout. A fight ensues, where Surya kills Vicky, Rudra Prathap and his partners, thus avenging Manvitha and his father's death.

== Cast ==
- Ganesh as ACP Surya
- Saikumar as DGP Agni
- Ranya Rao as Sangeetha
- Priyanka Thimmesh as Manvitha
- Ashish Vidyarthi as Rudra Prathap
- Sadhu Kokila as Basanti
- Kuri Prathap as Prathap
- Rockline Sudhakar as Sudakar
- Mohan Juneja as Prabhakara
- Vijay Chendoor as constable

== Soundtrack ==
Pataki

Soundtrack album by Arjun Janya
- Recorded: 2017
- Genre: Feature film soundtrack
- Label: Jhankar Music

Arjun Janya has composed the score and songs for the film.

Track list
No.	Title	Singer(s)	Length
1.	"Pataki"	Vijay Prakash
2.	"Meese Bittivni"	Vijay Prakash, Shamitha Malnad
3.	"Manase Manase"	Santhosh Venky
4.	"Jinga Jinga"	Tippu
5.	"Pataki Theme"	Arjun Janya

== Reception ==
Shashiprasad S. M. of the Deccan Chronicle wrote, "Manju Swaraj does a neat copy of Pataas but not all of them [firecrackers] explode, few even misfire". Sunayana Suresh of The Times of India wrote, "The film, in totality, makes for a decent watch with a good mix of action, comedy and romance. If you like your masala films with that extra tadka, this can entice you. The bonus is that Ganesh entertains as the new massy hero in town". Shyam Prasad S of the Bangalore Mirror wrote, "Pataki is a melodrama that overplays and overdoes everything unabashedly. It is hard to say when the purpose is comedy and when the film is serious".
