= Satyabhama (2007 film) =

- Poster
- Directed by: Srihari Nanu
- Written by: Nivas (dialogues)
- Screenplay by: Srihari Nanu
- Story by: Srihari Nanu
- Produced by: Bekkam Venu Gopal; Mamidisetti Srinivas
- Starring: Sivaji; Bhumika Chawla; Nimisha
- Edited by: Nagireddy
- Music by: Chakri
- Production company: Lucky Media
- Release date: 6 July 2007
- Running time: 155 minutes
- Country: India
- Language: Telugu

Satyabhama is a 2007 Indian Telugu-language drama film directed by Srihari Nanu. The film stars Sivaji and Bhumika Chawla. The film is based on the 2004 American film 50 First Dates. The film won two Nandi Awards.

== Plot ==
The film follows a sand sculptor (Sivaji) who meets a woman (Bhumika Chawla) with memory loss.

== Cast ==
- Sivaji as Krishna
- Bhumika Chawla as Satyabhama
- Nimisha
- Chandra Mohan
- Krishna as the psychiatrist (special appearance)
- Brahmanandam
- Sunil
- M. S. Narayana as Padi Secondla Padmanabham
- Raghu Babu
- Siva Prasad
- Melkote
- Devi Charan
- Chitram Srinu
- Allari Subhashini as the restaurant manager
- Babloo
- Apoorva
- Master Siva Varma
- Baby Satyapriya

== Production ==
Sivaji's character was inspired by Sudarshan Patnaik. The film was shot in Goa.

== Soundtrack ==
The music is composed by Chakri.

No.	Title	Singer(s)	Length
1.	"Nee Navvule"	Chakri
2.	"Hallo Madam"	Pramod
3.	"Hayiga"	Kousalya
4.	"Pyar Karo"	Kousalya
5.	"Karuguthunnai"	Chakri
6.	"Gundelona"	Kousalya
7.	"Theme Music"	Jeans Srinivas

== Reception ==
Sify praised the performance of the cast and opined that "On the whole, this film will only appeal to family audiences". Idlebrain said that "It disappoints the people who already watched 50 First Dates. But it may offer some variety for those people who have not watched 50 First Dates yet". Full Hyderabad gave a negative review and stated "Take it easy with this one unless you can forget tomorrow what you did today".

== Awards ==
Nandi Awards

- Special Jury Award for Best Performance - Bhumika Chawla
- Best Female Playback Singer - Kousalya
