= Dil Ne Jise Apna Kahaa =

2004 film by Atul Agnihotri

- Poster
- Directed by: Atul Agnihotri
- Screenplay by: Alok Upadhyaya; Purnendu Shekhar
- Story by: Atul Agnihotri
- Produced by: Sunil Manchanda; Mukesh Talreja
- Starring: Salman Khan; Preity Zinta; Bhumika Chawla
- Cinematography: Kishore Kapadia; Stephen Fernandes
- Edited by: Keshav Naidu
- Music by: Songs: A. R. Rahman; Himesh Reshammiya; Background Score: Bikram Vicckey Goswami
- Production companies: Orion Pictures; MAD Entertainment Ltd. Reel Life Entertainment Pvt. Ltd.
- Release date: 10 September 2004
- Running time: 135 minutes
- Country: India
- Language: Hindi
- Budget: ₹11 crore
- Box office: ₹13.54 crore

Dil Ne Jise Apna Kahaa (transl. The One Who My Heart Calls Mine) is a 2004 Indian Hindi-language romantic drama film starring Salman Khan, Preity Zinta, Bhumika Chawla, Delnaaz Paul, Riya Sen and Helen. It is an unofficial adaptation of the American film Return to Me (2000). The film had a poor opening and proved to be unsuccessful at the box office.

== Plot ==
Rishabh and Pari are deeply in love. He is wealthy chief editor at an advertising agency for film ads, and she is a hardworking, dedicated doctor. They marry, and soon Pari is pregnant. Pari has a dream to create a hospital for children. Tragically, she is involved in an accident and dies in the hospital after losing her unborn child as well from internal bleeding. Pari's last wish was to donate her heart to her patient Dhani. Rishabh is devastated and refuses to go on with the plan to donate the heart; he goes ahead with Pari's last request: the creation of the children’s hospital which Rishabh names Parilok (fairyland).

Dhani is cured, much to the joy of her family and her grandmother. Rishabh has gone into depression but soon comes across Pari's project to build Parilok. He begins to develop the project with the aid of his brother-in-law RT, and his team of project coordinators and architects. Soon enough, Rishabh and Dhani come across each other now that she works in his agency as a copywriter, and she feels an instant attraction to him. Rishabh becomes disgruntled and ignores her advances as he is still very much in love with Pari. RT begins to see a huge change in the agency since Dhani began working for them but Rishabh suggests that she should quit. By the time the early concepts for the Parilok hospital come in, Rishabh snaps at Dhani after she disapproves of the designs of the hospital. RT tries to get through with Rishabh’s miserableness and questions why he snapped at Dhani.

RT explains Rishabh’s bitterness to Dhani and tells her that Pari had donated her heart to a dying patient and that Rishabh hates Pari’s new heart donor. Dhani now knows the truth and that she now has Pari’s heart. She confronts Pari’s colleague and reveals her the truth and that everything that Pari used to love and hate are all linked to her heart. The next day, Dhani pulls together her version of the Parilok hospital concepts and everyone is amused by her presentation. Rishabh does not know that Pari's heart was given to Dhani, but soon he realizes that after Dhani collapses on his doorstep after nastily telling her to leave his house. Rishabh feels that he’s always responsible for someone’s death. Pari’s especially. His sister tells him that God must have given him the chance to love Pari again through Dhani. She gives him two choices: either to accept Dhani through Pari’s heart or let her die. Rishabh agrees to accept this fate. While she is in the hospital, with doctors struggling to restart her broken heart, he falls in love with her. He tells her that he loves her, and if she loves him, she will pull through. She does, and the two get together.

== Cast ==
- Salman Khan as Rishabh Mathur
- Preity Zinta as Dr. Parineeta Mathur (Pari)
- Bhumika Chawla as Dhanisha Chakraborty (Dhani)
- Rati Agnihotri as Dr. Shashi Rawat, cardiologist
- Helen as Dhani's grandmother
- Renuka Shahane as Piya Mathur, Rishabh's sister
- Aasif Sheikh as "R. T." Rajveer Tripathi
- Riya Sen as Kamini
- Delnaaz Paul as Dhillo
- Tarun Mehta
- Pappu Polyester
- Bobby Darling
- Gulshan Devaiah as DJ

== Production ==
Aishwarya Rai as well as Amrita Rao were considered for the lead role in this debut directorial of Atul Agnihotri.

== Soundtrack ==
A. R. Rahman was signed as the music composer. He had composed three tracks and left the project as he got busy with the stage adaptation of The Lord of the Rings. Meanwhile Himesh Reshammiya was signed to quickly compose the rest of the tracks.

Dil Ne Jise Apna Kaha

Soundtrack album by A. R. Rahman & Himesh Reshammiya
- Released: 7 August 2004 (India)
- Recorded: Panchathan Record Inn
- Genre: Feature film soundtrack
- Length: 41:03
- Label: T-Series

A. R. Rahman chronology
Yuva (2004)	Dil Ne Jise Apna Kaha (2004)	Swades (2004)

Himesh Reshammiya chronology
Taarzan: The Wonder Car (2004)	Dil Ne Jise Apna Kaha (2004)	Shukriya (2004)

#	Song	Artist(s)	Composer	Lyricist	Length
1	"Dil Ne Jise Apna Kaha"	Sujata Trivedi, Kamaal Khan	A. R. Rahman	Mehboob	06:18
2	"Bindiya Chamakne Lagi"	Udit Narayan, Alka Yagnik	Himesh Reshammiya	Sameer	06:22
3	"Yeh Dil To Mila Hai"	Sonu Nigam, Alka Yagnik	Himesh Reshammiya	Sameer	05:32
4	"Jaane Bahara"	Kamaal Khan, Sadhana Sargam	A. R. Rahman	Mehboob	05:14
5	"Go Balle Balle"	KK, Alisha Chinoy, Jayesh Gandhi	Himesh Reshammiya	Sameer	05:00
6	"Zindagi Hai Dua"	Pamela Jain, Madhushree, Gayatri Iyer, Karthik	A. R. Rahman	Mehboob	05:25
7	"Meri Nas Nas Mein"	Udit Narayan, Alka Yagnik	Himesh Reshammiya	Sameer	05:36
8	"Dil Ne Jise Apna Kaha (Instrumental)"	Instrumental	Himesh Reshammiya	Instrumental	02:20

== Box office ==
The film had a poor opening at the box office and in the end only grossed ₹7 crore.
