= Maanikya =

2014 Kannada action drama film

- Music DVD cover
- Directed by: Sudeepa
- Written by: Ravi Srivatsa (dialogues)
- Screenplay by: Sudeep
- Story by: Koratala Siva
- Based on: Mirchi (Telugu) by Koratala Siva
- Produced by: N. M. Kumar; Priya Sudeep
- Starring: Sudeepa; Ranya; Varalaxmi Sarathkumar
- Cinematography: Shekhar Chandra
- Edited by: N. M. Vishwa
- Music by: Arjun Janya
- Production companies: MNK Movies; Kiccha Creations; Kolla Entertainments
- Distributed by: M. N. Kumar
- Release date: 1 May 2014
- Running time: 165 minutes
- Country: India
- Language: Kannada
- Budget: ₹18 crore
- Box office: ₹35.7 – 40 crore

Maanikya (transl. The Ruby) is a 2014 Indian Kannada-language action drama film directed by Sudeepa. The film stars Sudeep and Varalaxmi Sarathkumar, alongside Ranya, V. Ravichandran and P. Ravi Shankar. The music was composed by Arjun Janya, while cinematography and editing were handled by Shekhar Chandra and N. M. Vishwa. It is a remake of 2013 Telugu film Mirchi.

Maanikya was released on 1 May 2014 to positive reviews from critics and was successful at the box office. The film retained its title for the Hindi dub.

== Plot ==
The movie begins with a girl collecting funds for an organisation in Singapore. A goon gives her money and then chases her at night when she goes home. Then Vijay, enters and resolves the conflict without fighting. The girl introduces herself as Manasa. They slowly become friends. But one day she asks Vijay to leave her and go as she fears that if their relationship develops any further, separation would be painful. He then goes back to India and influences Manasa's brother to a large extent. In his conservative and ancestral village, Vijay changes everyone's viewpoint and makes them more lovable.

Eventually Manasa expresses her love for him, but Vijay hesitates. It is then revealed that he was born to their rival's family. His father wanted to change the people of his village. But his mother Lavanya didn't want to stay there, so she left him. When Vijay goes there, he falls in love with his cousin Sindhu.

He starts taking revenge on the Manasa's family without revealing his identity. Then they decide to marry Vijay with Sindhu because they both are in love with each other. During the marriage the Inspector tells his father that the enmity is rekindling because his son is taking revenge on the rivals. Soon afterwards, the rivals come and start killing everyone. After the fight it is known that Vijay's mother dies. His father banishes him and blames her death on him. The story is now back to the present. Manasa's uncle, Beera challenges Vijay that if he can defeat his men then he too would follow non violence. After successfully defeating them, her uncle asks Vijay that if he could defeat the rival's son (not knowing that it was Vijay himself) he would marry Manasa to Vijay.

Vijay gets angry at his stubbornness and reveals his true identity. He starts fighting with Manasa's brother. Then all her family members come and convert him too. This was watched by his father who had just arrived there. His father welcomes him back to the family. The film ends with him reuniting with Sindhu.

== Cast ==
- Sudeepa as Vijay aka manikya
- Ravichandran as Adishesha, Vijay's father
- Ranya as Manasa
- Varalaxmi Sharathkumar as Sindhu, Vijay's paternal cousin
- Ramya Krishna as Lavanya, Adisesha's wife and Vijay's mother (Extended Cameo Appearance)
- P. Ravi Shankar as Beera, Adisesha's rival and Manasa's paternal uncle
- Shobaraj as Bhadra, Adisesha's younger brother
- Dharma as Shiva, Manasa's brother
- Ashok as Ugrappa, Beera's elder brother
- Padma Vasanthi as Lakshmi
- Avinash as Adisesha's brother-in-law
- Vijayakumar as Adisesha's father and Vijay's grandfather
- Sadhu Kokila as Veera Pratapa Simha
- Sharan as College Security guard
- Rekha Krishnappa as Manasa's mother
- Chitra Shenoy as Rathna
- Sathyajith as Bheema, Beera's second brother
- Tennis Krishna as Nagappa
- Veena Sundar as Fathima
- Shille Manjunath
- Komal Gandhi as Vijay's friend
- Rahul Salanke as Yogi
- Chiranjeevi Sarja as cameo appearance in song "Mani Mani Maanikya"
- Arjun Janya as cameo appearance in song "Mani Mani Maanikya"
- Yogaraj Bhat as cameo appearance in song "Mani Mani Maanikya"
- Dwarakish as cameo appearance in song "Mani Mani Maanikya"
- V. Harikrishna as cameo appearance in song "Mani Mani Maanikya"
- Chi Guru Dutt as cameo appearance in song "Mani Mani Maanikya"
- Kiran Rathod in item number "Pantara Panta"
- Shweta Pandit in item number "Pantara Panta"
- Rishika Singh in item number "Pantara Panta"

== Production ==
=== Development ===
After the success of his previous venture, Bachchan, Sudeepa was met with lot of offers from various south film directors. However, he announced in his social network site that he would be teaming up with ace actor – director V. Ravichandran in his next venture. It was reported that Sudeepa would be directing Ravichandran for his next film. Later in July 2013, it was speculated that Ravichandran would be playing father to Sudeepa and the film may be a remake of 2013 Telugu film Mirchi which starred Prabhas and Satyaraj in the son – father roles respectively. It was later confirmed that the story is tweaked and Ravichandran would be playing the father role to Sudeep and Ramya Krishna would be his pair. Bollywood actress Juhi Chawla was initially offered the role of Ravichandran's partner, but turned it down as she didn't want to play a mother to the hero.

=== Title ===
Sudeepa profusely thanked veteran Dwarakish for suggesting the title Maanikya.

=== Filming ===
The filming of the film commenced from August 2013 at a Bangalore city college. Major portions of the film is shot at Bidar(a crown city of karnataka) and Hyderabad. The film unit also flew to Bangkok to film a song sequence and few action sequences.

== Soundtrack ==
Maanikya

Soundtrack album by Arjun Janya
- Released: 9 April 2014
- Recorded: 2014
- Genre: Feature film soundtrack
- Length: 29:06
- Language: Kannada
- Label: Anand Audio
- Producer: Arjun Janya

Arjun Janya chronology
Angaaraka (2014)	Maanikya (2014)	Paru Wife of Devadas (2014)

The soundtrack of the film was composed by Arjun Janya. The soundtrack was released by Anand Audio on 9 April 2014.

No.	Title	Lyrics	Singer(s)	Length
1.	"Ninna Hinde"	Jayanth Kaikini	Karthik	04:31
2.	"Huchcha Na"	Yograj Bhat	Vijay Prakash	04:09
3.	"Maamu Maamu"	Kaviraj	Vijay Prakash, Priya Himesh	03:58
4.	"Pantara Panta"	Dr. V. Nagendra Prasad	Malathi	02:02
5.	"Jeeva Jeeva"	K. Kalyan	Shankar Mahadevan	04:55
6.	"Jeena Jeena Ya"	Dr. V. Nagendra Prasad	Shaan	03:50
7.	"Nalla Malla"	Dr. V. Nagendra Prasad	Arjun Janya	02:43
8.	"Belake Belake"	Dr. V. Nagendra Prasad	Shankar Mahadevan	01:11
9.	"Mani Mani Maanikya"	Kaviraj	G. Vijay Babu, Shivarudra Naik (kanakapura)	01:43
Total length:				29:06

== Release ==
Maanikya was released in around 250 screens on 1 May 2014. And also released on 15 May 2014 in Sharjah, on 16 May 2014 in Dubai and Abu Dhabi. Maanikya is the first Kannada film released in Oman and Bahrain and released on 30 May 2014. Maanikya also released in United States on 30 May 2014 and in Perth, Australia on 17 August 2014 Maanikya is the first Kannada film screened in Indian Film Festival of Ireland and screened on 20 September 2014

=== Box office ===
Maanikya completed 100 days on 8 August 2014.

== Reception ==
- Bangalore mirror gave the film 3.5/5 stars saying "It's a near-perfect mix of action, drama, romance and comedy. In a line, it's the story of a scion of a family to bring together two warring families. However, it is not as simple as that. The film meddles with multiple genres —from romance to action to comedy to family drama to something more. The plot of the film matches its length, the narration and the twists keep the audience glued. Credit should go to director Sudeep for packing every available slot with good actors. The film is a real ensemble. There are top-notch actors everywhere."
- Chitraloka gave the film 3.75/5 stars and called it a complete family entertainer and further said "Maanikya comes as a cool breeze for the summer. It is the perfect holiday gift from Sudeep and team. It has all the masala elements that a commercial film demands. There are so many things in Maanikya but all of them are perfectly placed. It is a film you will love to watch in a cool big screen theatre. This is one film you should reserve a day for this week."
- One India gave the film 3.5/5 stars and said "Maanikya, which is the first combination of Abhinaya Chakravarthy Kichcha Sudeep and Sandalwood's ace actor Crazy Star Ravichandran, has got a grand opening across the state, and will be a biggest treat for the long weekend. Sudeep looks superb in action, comedy, dance and sentimental sequence. It is Kiccha, who steals the show."
- Times of India gave 4/5 stars and said "Armed with a good script, the director has taken care to see that the narration does not lag at any point. The story moves fast and almost all the major characters have equal share of work to do. With a long list of senior artistes, Sudeep has succeeded in giving them the right roles."
- Deccan Herald gave the film 3/5 stars and said: "Fans will surely have no complaints with Maanikya."
- Sharadhaa from the India express called Maanikya a Refreshing Treat for Sudeep's Fans, saying "Sudeep has pulled off the film credibly as a director and actor but looks a bit tired at times probably because of the huge responsibility he undertook. He is excellent in scenes when he shows the human frailty of his character. A role only matched by Ravichandran as the father. With writing by Koratala Siva, a good supporting cast combined with Arjun Janya’s music, cinematography by Shekhar Chandra and Sudeep’s over all effort, the film has turned out to be a good family entertainer."
- Shashiprasad from the Deccan Chronicle said "What happens when Crazy Star V. Ravichandran and Kichcha Sudeep come together on big screen for the first time? 'Entertainment' at its best would be the simplest answer to it. When nobody could imagine the evergreen lover of sandalwood shifting his gear down for a 'fathrer' role, Maanikya is a well crafted remake of the hit Telugu movie Mirchi. Crazy, Kichcha shine in yet another 'remake'."

=== Other revenues ===
The film did ₹8.5 crore (US$880,000) of business before its release by the (satellite-dubbing-audio-DVD-other) rights.

The satellite rights of the film were sold for ₹5.5 crore (US$570,000) to Asianet Suvarna and Hindi dubbing rights for ₹1.5 crore (US$160,000). Meanwhile, Tamil, Telugu and Malayalam dubbing rights for ₹75 lakh (US$78,000) each. The audio rights have been acquired by Anand Audio for ₹25 lakh (US$26,000) and the DVD rights have gone for a similar amount. The remaining rights too have been secured for ₹25 lakh (US$26,000).
