= Milenge Milenge =

2010 film by Satish Kaushik

- Theatrical release poster
- Directed by: Satish Kaushik
- Written by: Shiraz Ahmed
- Produced by: Boney Kapoor; Surinder Kapoor
- Starring: Shahid Kapoor; Kareena Kapoor
- Cinematography: Sethu Sriram
- Edited by: Sanjay Verma
- Music by: Songs: Himesh Reshammiya; Background Score: Sanjoy Chowdhury
- Production company: Narasimha Enterprises
- Distributed by: Eros International; Sahara One Motion Pictures
- Release date: 9 July 2010
- Running time: 117 minutes
- Country: India
- Language: Hindi

Milenge Milenge (transl. We will meet) is a 2010 Indian Hindi-language romantic comedy film directed by Satish Kaushik. Largely based on the 2001 film Serendipity, the film stars Shahid Kapoor and Kareena Kapoor. Satish Shah, Aarti Chhabria, and Delnaaz Paul appear in supporting roles. The film received overwhelmingly negative reviews from critics and bombed at the box office.

== Plot ==
Priya Malhotra is an orphan living in Delhi who hopes to have a family of her own and keeps a diary outlining her dreams and the type of man she wants to meet – someone who does not drink, smoke, or tell lies. She is skeptical when her friend Honey's aunt, a card reader, Sunita Rao, predicts that she will go to a foreign land and find the love of her life in seven days. Priya is pleasantly surprised when she is selected to go to the Youth Festival in Bangkok.

That is where Immy enters. Immy, who also goes to attend the Youth Festival in Bangkok from India, is the complete opposite of what Priya wants in a guy as he is amongst those who smokes, drinks, and tell lies. Due to his bad habits, Immy is being chased by security when he and his friends disguised as females in order to wish one of his friends girlfriend on her birthday, and in process, Immy runs into Priya's hostel room to hide. Before he leaves, Immy sees Priya and falls in love with her. He takes her diary and escapes. Immy then pretends to be the guy Priya wants to be with (after reading her diary), and the two start a relationship. Soon enough, Priya spots her diary in Immy’s room and realises that he had stolen her diary and pretended to be like her dream man. She breaks up with him and returns to Delhi to forget about her past.

After she reaches the airport, Immy also arrives on the same day and explains to Priya that destiny wants them together, shortly after they both returned to India from Bangkok. Priya does not believe him — through her motive to move on and to get rid of Immy, Priya further plans to leave Delhi and relocate — and therefore challenges him that if destiny did want them together, they would both find each other again in the future. In order to prove the challenge Priya has given to Immy, the former asks Immy to write his name and phone number on a currency note and uses it to buy a numerology book, in which she writes her own name and phone number, and then she sells it in a market. Additionally, Priya takes Immy to a hotel, where they both take separate lifts. If both of them press the same button in the elevator, it will prove that destiny brought them together. Although Priya and Immy pressed the same button, Immy's lift slowed down because a child entered the lift with his father and pressed all the buttons. As a result, Immy could not meet Priya. Now, it was all up to the currency note and the numerology book to come back to Priya and Immy, respectively, for them to get back together.

Three years later, Immy, now changed to be a good person from what he was earlier, returns home to Delhi after completing his education from America. On the process of his homecoming to India, Immy gets engaged to Sofiya at a party where his old friends were also present (Immy first met Sofiya during his stay in America while on progress to finish his further studies. Immy lived in Sofiya’s house in America as a guest and they both maintained friendship initially). On the other hand, Priya is engaged to a model or aspiring singer Jatin, as she has since been living in Mumbai when planned to relocate from Delhi. Jatin proposed Priya quite a few times but she rejected where the latter also maintained friendship with Jatin until finally reached the day she said 'Yes' to his proposal. However, a week before the marriage of Priya and Immy with their respective fiancés/fiancées, both of them plan to meet each other at least for once and in order to do so, Immy looks for the numerology book in various bookstores in Delhi. Whereas, Priya keeps thinking of the currency note and finally, she goes to Delhi with her friend Honey on the pretext of Honey's birthday gift as coincides with Immy's plan to go Mumbai with his friend Ashish who was with him all along. This is where Priya and Immy planned to look for each other in order to meet again after three years (The day Immy arrives in Mumbai from Delhi, it was vice versa with Priya — departing from Mumbai to Delhi — as they both were not aware of each others case. The taxi that dropped Priya on Mumbai airport's arrival line by mistake as supposed to go to departure line, Immy takes the same taxi unknowingly upon his arrival in Mumbai). After Priya's arrival in Delhi, her search is hindered by the fact that she does not know Immy's real name nor his full name. With several near misses, Priya finally finds the currency note on the date of her marriage to Jatin who arrived in Delhi few days later as the court marriage between the two was planned to take place in Delhi, same date as Immy's marriage to Sofiya. Immy also finally gets the book after he returns to Delhi from Mumbai as he was longing to get that book from various bookstores earlier where Sofiya collected the book on his behalf, minutes before Immy's return. Immy also tell his past with Priya to Sofiya and wish to proceed to his marriage with her (Sofiya) anyway but on the honest note. On the wedding day, Sofiya finally stopped her marriage to Immy after learning Immy's past with Priya — Sofiya noticed Priya's name and number on the book — as she did not want to replace the love between them (Immy and Priya), when the event was happening at a hotel in Delhi (the same hotel where Priya and her friend Honey stayed in after arrival at Delhi). Immy and Priya finally meet each other in-person as they both find each other at the same place where the pair last seen each other three years before. The very moment, Immy reveals his real name is Amit as he also brought the currency note as given to him by a child in the hotel (Priya dropped the currency note at the hotel when she thought Immy had married Sofiya which was later withdrawn). The film ends with both of them reuniting — Immy and Priya forgave as well as apologised to each other for their past — and marrying at the same venue (hotel).

== Cast ==
- Shahid Kapoor as Amit "Immy" Kapoor
- Kareena Kapoor as Priya Malhotra
- Aarti Chhabria as Sofiya Rajeev Arora
- Kirron Kher as Sunita Rao
- Sarfraz Khan as Aashish Bihani
- Delnaaz Paul as Honey
- Satish Shah as Trilok Kapoor
- Himani Shivpuri as Mrs. Neha Gandhi
- Satish Kaushik as Eajaz Bhai

== Production ==
In 2004, the cast began shooting in Delhi and Dubai, and later continued to shoot at Pathways World School. They were also supposed to shoot in Thailand, but Kapoor asked for a delay to attend the premiere of Dil Maange More!!!, thus avoiding the 2004 Indian Ocean tsunami that destroyed the hotel that the cast and crew had been scheduled to stay in. The movie was expected to hit screens on 23 December 2005, but due to financial and casting problems, it failed to do so. Salman Khan was signed on to do an important extended guest appearance for the film but opted out because of differences with the film's lead pair (Shahid Kapoor and Kareena Kapoor).

After the lead pair broke up, sources indicated that they would not come together to dub for the film. However, the director, Satish Kaushik questioned: "...why should Shahid and Kareena have any problems dubbing it?" Producer Boney Kapoor further noted that "...perhaps it was destined that the most romantic film featuring Shahid and Kareena would come after their relationship." In December 2007, sources indicated that the film was scheduled to be released the day after Valentine's Day (15 February 2008), but it was again delayed. On 1 April 2008, the director announced that Shahid Kapoor had begun dubbing for the film, whilst Kareena Kapoor would begin after she returned from her overseas trip. In February 2009, it was reported that both the actors had finally completed dubbing for the movie.

== Reception ==
=== Critical reception ===
Upon release, Milenge Milenge received mixed to negative reviews from critics. Rajeev Masand of CNN-IBN gave the film a rating of 1.5 out of 5 and described the film as "regressive, senseless, and packed with plot-holes the size of craters". Taran Adarsh of Bollywood Hungama rated it 2/5 and said, "Milenge Milenge has the charismatic lead pair, who are very popular with the youth, as its USP. But the problem is its dated look. Having taken a long time to reach the theatres, it will have to rely on a solid word of mouth to lure the audiences into cineplexes". Mayank Shekhar of the Hindustan Times gave it 1.5/5 saying, "Years since, while the film's main pair may not be friends anymore, have probably knocked each other off their Facebook pages, trashed old kissing pics, tucked away the sweet SMSes, they can't quite disown a new release that celebrates them still. Well. Sucks. I guess!". Gaurav Malani of Indiatimes gave the film 2/5 and stated, "Watch it only if you are just interested to see Kareena Kapoor when the term size zero wasn't coined. Else Milenge Milenge doesn't score too much above zero".

=== Box office ===
The film opened to a poor opening and collected ₹110 million (US$1.1 million) in its theatrical run.

== Soundtrack ==
Milenge Milenge

Soundtrack album by Himesh Reshammiya
- Released: 11 June 2010
- Recorded: 2010
- Venue: Mumbai
- Genre: Film soundtrack
- Length: 47:46
- Label: T-Series
- Producers: Boney Kapoor; Himesh Reshammiya

Himesh Reshammiya chronology
Radio (2009)	Milenge Milenge (2010)	Kajraare (2010)

The film's soundtrack was composed by Himesh Reshammiya.

All lyrics are written by Sameer.

No.	Title	Singer(s)	Length
1.	"Milenge Milenge"	Alka Yagnik, Jayesh Gandhi	04:46
2.	"Kuch To Bakee Hai"	Himesh Reshammiya	03:55
3.	"Ishq Ki Galee"	Rahat Fateh Ali Khan, Jayesh Gandhi	05:15
4.	"Tum Chain Ho"	Sonu Nigam, Alka Yagnik, Suzanne D'Mello	05:11
5.	"Milenge Milenge" (Title Song)	Ankit Tiwari, Shreya Ghoshal	05:07
6.	"Yeh Hare Kaanch Ki Choodiyan"	Alka Yagnik	04:43
7.	"Kuch To Bakee Hai" (Bright Mix)	Himesh Reshammiya	04:00
8.	"Ishq Ki Galee" (Dance Mix)	Rahat Fateh Ali Khan, Jayesh Gandhi	03:40
9.	"Kuch To Bakee Hai" (Dark Mix)	Himesh Reshammiya	03:59
10.	"Tum Chain Ho" (Unplugged)	Vinit Singh	04:12
11.	"Tum Chain Ho" (Lounge Mix)	Sonu Nigam, Alka Yagnik, Suzanne D'Mello	04:25
