= Maintenance of Internal Security Act, 1971 =

1971 Indian law

Parliament of India
- Long title: An Act to provide for detention in certain cases for the purpose of maintenance of ,internal security and matters connected therewith.
- Citation: Act No. 26 of 1971
- Territorial extent: India except J&K
- Assented to by: President V. V. Giri
- Assented to: 2 July 1971
- Repealed: 3 August 1978

Repeals
- Maintenance of Internal Security Ordinance, 1971

Amended by
- Maintenance of Internal Security (Amendment) Act, 1975; Maintenance of Internal Security (Amendment) Act, 1976; Maintenance of Internal Security (Second Amendment) Act, 1976

Repealed by
- Maintenance of Internal Security (Repeal) Act, 1978
- Status: Repealed

The Maintenance of Internal Security Act, 1971 (MISA) was a controversial law passed by the Indian parliament in 1971, giving the administration of Prime Minister Indira Gandhi and Indian law enforcement agencies very broad powers – indefinite preventive detention of individuals, search and seizure of property without warrants, and wiretapping – in the quelling of civil and political disorder in India, as well as countering foreign-inspired sabotage, terrorism, subterfuge and threats to national security. The law was amended several times during the subsequently declared national emergency (1975–1977) and used for quelling political dissent. Finally, it was repealed in 1977, when Indira Gandhi lost the 1977 Indian general election and the Janata Party came to power.

== History ==
MISA was enacted on 2 July 1971, and replaced a previous ordinance with similar intent called, the "Maintenance of Internal Security Ordinance" promulgated by the President of India on 7 May 1971. The Act was based on the Preventive Detention Act of 1950 (PDA), enacted for a period of a year, before it was extended until 31 December 1969.

The legislation gained infamy for its disregard of legal and constitutional safeguards of civil rights, especially when "going all the way down" on the competition, and during the period of national emergency (1975–1977) as thousands of innocent people were believed to have been arbitrarily arrested, tortured and in some cases, even forcibly sterilized.

The legislation was also invoked to justify the arrest of Indira Gandhi's political opponents, including the leaders and activists of the opposition Janata Party. In all, during the emergency period of 1975–1977, some 100,000 people, which included journalists, scholars, activists and opposition politicians, were detained without trial for up to 18 months. Some people were even detained for opposing forced sterilization drives or demolition of slums carried out during this period.

The 39th Amendment to the Constitution of India placed MISA in the 9th Schedule to the Constitution, thereby making it totally immune from any judicial review even on the grounds that it contravened the fundamental rights guaranteed by the Constitution, or violated the Basic Structure.

The law was repealed in 1977 following the election of a Janata Party-led government; the 44th Amendment Act of 1978 similarly removed MISA from the 9th Schedule.

However, other coercive legislation like Armed Forces (Special Powers) Act, 1958 (AFSPA), the Essential Services Maintenance Act (ESMA, 1968), and economic counterpart of the act, Conservation of Foreign Exchange and Prevention of Smuggling Activities Act (COFEPOSA) enacted on 13 December 1974 to prevent smuggling and black-marketing in foreign exchange is still enforced. Controversial successors to such legislation include the National Security Act (1980), Terrorism and Disruptive Activities (Prevention) Act (TADA, 1985–1995), and the Prevention of Terrorism Act (POTA, 2002), criticized for authorizing excessive powers for the aim of fighting internal and cross-border terrorism and political violence, without safeguards for civil freedoms.

== Pension ==
In the non-Indian National Congress ruled states of Madhya Pradesh and Chhattisgarh, people detained under Maintenance of Internal Security Act (MISA) and Defence of India Act (DIR) during the 1975-1977 national emergency, get Rs. 15,000 pension per month from the respective state governments. In 2014, the Rajasthan government restarted its pension scheme of Rs. 12,000 per month for 800 enlisted former detainees, first launched under Chief Minister Vasundhara Raje's first term in 2008. The scheme was discontinued in 2009, by Ashok Gehlot-led Congress government.

== Detainees ==
Some notable political leaders imprisoned under Maintenance of Internal Security Act:

- Jayprakash Narayan
- Atal Bihari Vajpayee
- Lal Krishna Advani
- Chandra Shekhar
- Devi Lal
- George Fernandes
- M.K.Stalin
- T. R. Baalu
- Arcot N. Veeraswami
- Murasoli Maran
- Jai Kishan Gupta (one of the longest MISA detainee from Delhi)
- Mulayam Singh Yadav
- Lalu Prasad Yadav
- Santosh Bharti, thrice (1973 - 74 - 75)
- Sharad Yadav, twice (1973–75)
- Vijay Rupani
- Choudhary Mir Singh philanthropist from Munirka, Delhi
- Charanjeet Bhatia
- Dr. Satpal kapoor, Sonepat (Hr.)
- N. Azu Newmai, one of the leaders of UDF, a regional political party of Nagaland

== See also ==
- 42nd Amendment Act of 1976
