= Tere Naam =

2003 Indian film by Satish Kaushik

- Theatrical release poster
- Directed by: Satish Kaushik
- Screenplay by: Jainendra Jain
- Story by: Bala
- Based on: Sethu by Bala
- Produced by: Sunil Manchanda; Mukesh Talreja
- Starring: Salman Khan; Bhumika Chawla
- Cinematography: Sethu Sriram
- Edited by: Sanjay Verma
- Music by: Songs: Himesh Reshammiya; Guest Composition: Sajid–Wajid; Background Score: Bikram Vicckey Goswami
- Production company: Orion Pictures
- Distributed by: MAD Entertainment
- Release date: 15 August 2003
- Running time: 138 minutes
- Country: India
- Language: Hindi
- Budget: ₹10 crore
- Box office: ₹24.54 crore

Tere Naam (/θeɪreɪ nɑːm/; English title: In Your Name) is a 2003 Indian Hindi-language tragedy romantic drama film directed by Satish Kaushik and written by Jainendra Jain. The film stars Salman Khan and Bhumika Chawla in her Hindi cinema debut. It is a remake of the Tamil film Sethu (1999).

The film was based on a real-life incident of a friend of Bala's, who had fallen in love, lost his mind, and ended up at a mental asylum. Considered as cult classic, Tere Naam was released on 15 August 2003 and became a moderate box-office success, although its soundtrack album was a major success. Salman Khan was praised for his portrayal of Radhe Mohan, and the role is widely considered one of the finest performances of his career.

Tere Naam received a total of 24 award nominations, including eight at the Filmfare Awards, and won seven accolades.

== Plot ==
The film centres around a tough college student and graduate jobless rowdy Radhe Mohan, who leads the Student Union and has a violent temper. He lives with his elder brother Shiv, a court magistrate, and often clashes with him. Only his sister-in-law Gayatri seems to truly understand him.

Radhe wins the Student Union election and gets into a fight during the celebrations. Though aggressive, he begins to change after meeting Nirjara, a timid Brahmin girl. Radhe helps her some times, and she seems to like him a bit. One day, Radhe proposes to her and jokingly remarks that he will beat her father up if he doesn't agree to their marriage. Nirjara is too shocked to say much and utters "yes" when Radhe asks her if she was listening to him. Radhe interprets this as her acceptance of the proposal. Later he and his friends intimidate Nirjara fiancé, Rameshwar. The next day, Radhe brings her a gift, but she tells him that she does not love him and calls him a goon. A heartbroken Radhe subsequently tries to talk to her, but she refuses to engage in a conversation.

Radhe's friends suggest that he give up rowdyism and violence to impress Nirjara but one day, he roughs up a goon who had beaten up one of his friends. As Radhe is about to punch him. Nirjara arrives at the scene, and Radhe stops the violence and allowing the goon to escape. Following a fight with Aslam, Radhe realizes his love for Nirjara is causing him to act recklessly and apologizes to him and the others. However, he still continues his days remaining heartbroken over Nirjara. Subsequently, Nirjara's elder sister Mamta, who is in need of money, is nearly tricked into prostitution when she unknowingly visits a brothel to meet a man who promises her a loan. Radhe, who does not know that she is Nirjara's sister, visits the same brothel to find a man who had harassed a woman and had hit his friend for intervening. He saves Mamta from being arrested during a police raid. She tells him that her husband Aatmaram has kicked her out of their house and is demanding money to give her custody of their son. the next day, Radhe beats up Aatmaram, forcing him to take her back and to stop harassing her. Rameshwar sees this and tells Nirjara that Radhe is a good selfless man who truly loves her. Unaware of this conversation and frustrated with Nirjara refusing to speak with him, Radhe abducts Nirjara (which is the opposite of what Rameshwar was saying about him) so that he can express his feelings for her. Nirjara initially feels intimidated but ultimately falls in love with him.

Subsequently, the brothel owner and his goons attack Radhe to take revenge on him for trying to shut down their business. Radhe attempts to fight back but is quickly overwhelmed and in the midst of attack, the goons slam Radhe's head onto the buffer of a train, causing Radhe to suffer from brain damage and lose his mental balance.

His family admits him to a mental institution, as Nirjara and his friends pray for him and his safety. However, the doctors deem it difficult to cure him, so he is sent to an ashram where the ayuvedic treatment might provide a chance to cure him. At the ashram, Radhe becomes thin, has a buzzcut, wears torn clothes, and is chained to the walls along with other mentally ill patients. At some point Radhe's mental state returns to normal, but the wardens do not understand him. Radhe tries to escape with help from the other patients, only to get hurt with more serious injuries in the process. Nirjara visits the institution and sees him in a pitiful condition while he is sleeping. When he wakes up, he realizes that Nirjara visited him and he tries to yell out her name, but she is unable to hear him due to the noise from the other patients and leaves Radhe in tears.

Convinced that Radhe is not going to recover, Radhe's brother asks her to forget him and marry Rameshwar. On the day of Nirjara's wedding with Rameshwar, Radhe escapes from the institution and arrives at her home, only to find that she has committed suicide.

Devastated, Radhe limps away in silence. His friends and family run after him in tears, but he doesn't respond. The ashram wardens arrive and take him back. The film ends with Radhe stepping into the van, broken and without reason to live after losing his true love.

== Cast ==
- Salman Khan as Radhe Mohan
- Bhumika Chawla as Nirjara Bharadwaj
- Sachin Khedekar as Shiv Mohan, Radhe's brother, Gayatri's husband
- Savita Prabhune as Gayatri Mohan, Shiv's wife, Radhe's sister-in-law
- Ravi Kishan as Rameshwar, Nirjara's fiancee
- Sarfraz Khan as Aslam Sheikh, Radhe's best friend
- Darshan Kumar as Kanak Sharma, Radhe's friend
- Gopal Datt as Chander, Radhe's friend
- Anang Desai as Doctor Acharya
- Dinesh Kaushik as Aatmaram, Nirjara's brother-in-law
- Indira Krishnan as Mamta, Nirjara's elder sister
- Radhika Chaudhari as a mute beggar
- Mahima Chaudhry in a special appearance in "O Jaana" song
- Daisy Shah as background dancer in "Lagan Lagi"
- Saurabh Dubey as Pandit Bharadwaj, Nirjara's father
- Mahendra Verma as Brothel pimp
- Ghanashyam Nayak as Chandu Chaiwala

== Production ==
Anurag Kashyap was originally hired to direct the film but later removed from the film as he wanted Salman Khan to not shave his chest as the character of Radhe hailed from Uttar Pradesh where men are known to be very raw in terms of appearance. Satish Kaushik later took over. Ameesha Patel was originally considered to play the role of Nirjara, but scheduling conflicts prevented her from accepting. The role went to Bhumika Chawla, who made her Bollywood debut in the film. Salman Khan's hairstyle in the film is based on Abdul Kalam.

== Soundtrack ==
Tere Naam

Soundtrack album by Himesh Reshammiya & Sajid - Wajid
- Released: 28 June 2003
- Genre: Feature film soundtrack
- Length: 53:36
- Language: Hindi
- Label: T-Series
- Producer: Himesh Reshammiya

Himesh Reshammiya & Sajid - Wajid chronology
Footpath (2003)	Tere Naam (2003)	Zameen (2003)

Sajid - Wajid chronology
Chori Chori (2003)	Tere Naam (2003)	Garv (2004)

Professional ratings
Review scores
Source	Rating
Planet Bollywood	6/10 stars

The soundtrack of the film consists of 12 songs. The music is composed by Himesh Reshammiya and Sajid - Wajid with lyrics by Sameer and Jalees Sherwani.

Vocals for Salman Khan were supplied by Udit Narayan in all the songs except Lagan Lagi, which was sung by Sukhwinder Singh. Alka Yagnik provided vocals for Bhumika Chawla.

Upon its release, the soundtrack album became a massive hit with its songs gaining huge popularity and becoming chartbusters. The soundtrack sold around 3 million copies becoming the highest selling Indian music album of the year in India.

=== Track list ===
#	Song	Singer(s)	Composer	Length	Lyrics
1	"Chand” (Not in the film)	Udit Narayan	Himesh Reshammiya	05:35	Sameer Anjaan
2	"Kyun Kisi Ko"	Udit Narayan	Himesh Reshammiya	05:37	Sameer Anjaan
3	"Lagan Lagi"	Sukhwinder Singh	Sajid–Wajid	04:35	Sameer Anjaan
4	"Man Basia O Kanha "	Alka Yagnik	Himesh Reshammiya	03:04	Sameer Anjaan
5	"O Jaana"	Udit Narayan, Alka Yagnik, K.K., Shaan, Kamal Khan	Himesh Reshammiya	05:28	Sameer Anjaan
6	"Odhni"	Udit Narayan, Alka Yagnik	Himesh Reshammiya	06:49	Sameer Anjaan
7	"Tere Naam"	Udit Narayan, Alka Yagnik	Himesh Reshammiya	06:49	Sameer Anjaan
8	"Tumse Milna"	Udit Narayan, Alka Yagnik	Himesh Reshammiya	04:41	Sameer Anjaan
9	"O Jaana" (remix)	Udit Narayan, Alka Yagnik, K.K., Shaan, Kamal Khan	Himesh Reshammiya	05:28	Sameer Anjaan
10	"Tere Naam (Sad)"	Udit Narayan	Himesh Reshammiya	02:03	Sameer Anjaan
11	"Tere Naam (Female)"	Alka Yagnik	Himesh Reshammiya		Sameer Anjaan
12	"Tune Saath Jo Mera Chhoda"	Udit Narayan, Raghav	Sajid–Wajid	05:33	Jalees Sherwani
13	"Tune Saath Jo Mera Chhoda (Sad)"	Udit Narayan	Sajid–Wajid	01:22	Jalees Sherwani
Total Length : 53:36

== Release ==
The film was released on Blu-ray Disc on 13 December 2010 by Eros International.

In early 2026, it was announced that the film would be re-released in theatres on 27 February 2026 to commemorate its 23rd anniversary.

== Critical reception ==
Taran Adarsh of Bollywood Hungama awarded 3/5 stars and wrote, "Salman is exceptional in a role that fits him to the T. He breathes fire in sequences that demand uneasiness. But beneath the tough exterior lies a vulnerable person and this facet in particular comes to the fore in the latter reels. His emotional outbursts are splendid..., Bhoomika Chawla reminds you of Bhagyashree. Her simple, humble, traditionally indian character should go down very well with the viewers. Her performance is first-rate".

Madhureeta Mukherjee of The Times of India said, "Salman has given the great performance in the film. He's given an intense, unconventional performance. Believe this is the best performance of Salman's career so far".

== Box office ==
The film's total gross was ₹24.54 crore worldwide and was a moderate commercial success.

== Awards ==
=== Winner ===
Year	Recipient	Award(s)	Result
2003	Himesh Reshammiya	Star Screen Award Best Music Director	Won
2003	Himesh Reshammiya	Screen Weekly Award for Best Music Director	Won
2003	Himesh Reshammiya	Zee Cine Award for Best Music Director	Won
2003	Bhumika Chawla	Zee Cine Award Best Female Debut	Won
2003	Bikram Vicckey Goswami	Zee Cine Award for Best Background Score	Won
2003	Alka Yagnik	Apsara Film Award for Best Female Playback Singer	Won
2003	Alka Yagnik	Sansui Award for Best Playback Female Singer	Won

=== Nominated ===
Year	Award(s)	Recipient	Result
2003	Filmfare Best Film Award	Tere Naam	Nominated
2003	Filmfare Best Director Award	Satish Kaushik	Nominated
2003	Filmfare Best Actor Award	Salman Khan	Nominated
2003	Filmfare Best Actress Award	Bhumika Chawla	Nominated
2003	Filmfare Best Male Playback Award	Udit Narayan for "Tere Naam"	Nominated
2003	Filmfare Best Female Playback Award	Alka Yagnik for "Oodhni"	Nominated
2003	Filmfare Best Music Director Award	Himesh Reshammiya	Nominated
2003	Filmfare Best Lyricist Award	Sameer for "Tere Naam"	Nominated
2003	Star Screen Award Best Actor	Salman Khan	Nominated
2003	Star Screen Award Best Actress	Bhumika Chawla	Nominated
2003	Star Screen Award Best Male Playback	Udit Narayan	Nominated
2003	Star Screen Award Best Female Playback	Alka Yagnik	Nominated
2003	IIFA Award for Best Film	Tere Naam	Nominated
2003	IIFA Award for Best Director	Satish Kaushik	Nominated
2003	IIFA Award for Best Actor	Salman Khan	Nominated
2003	IIFA Award for Best Music Director	Himesh Reshammiya	Nominated
2003	IIFA Award for Best Lyricist	Sameer for "Kyun Kisi Ko"	Nominated
2003	IIFA Award for Best Male Playback Singer	Udit Narayan for "Tere Naam"	Nominated
2003	IIFA Award for Best Female Playback Singer	Alka Yagnik for "Oodhni"	Nominated
