= Conservation of Foreign Exchange and Prevention of Smuggling Activities Act, 1974 =

Indian act of parliament

Parliament of India
- Long title: An Act to provide for preventive detention in certain cases for the purposes of conservation and augmentation of Foreign Exchange and prevention of smuggling activities and for matters connected therewith.
- Citation: Act No. 52 of 1974
- Territorial extent: whole of India
- Passed by: Lok Sabha
- Passed: 6 December 1974
- Passed by: Rajya Sabha
- Passed: 11 December 1974
- Assented to by: President Fakhruddin Ali Ahmed
- Assented to: 13 December 1974
- Commenced: 19 December 1974

Legislative history

Initiating chamber: Lok Sabha
- Bill title: Conservation of Foreign Exchange and Prevention of Smuggling Activities Bill, 1974
- Introduced: 3 December 1974
- Passed: 6 December 1974

Revising chamber: Rajya Sabha
- Passed: 11 December 1974

Repeals
- Maintenance of Internal Security (Amendment) Ordinance, 1974 (11 of 1974)

Amended by
- 1. Conservation of Foreign Exchange and Prevention of Smuggling Activities (Amendment) Act, 1975 (35 of 1975); 2. Conservation of Foreign Exchange and Prevention of Smuggling Activities (Amendment) Act, 1976 (20 of 1976); 3. Conservation of Foreign Exchange and Prevention of Smuggling Activities (Second Amendment) Act, 1976 (90 of 1976); 4. Conservation of Foreign Exchange and Prevention of Smuggling Activities (Amendment) Act, 1984 (58 of 1984); 5. Conservation of Foreign Exchange and Prevention of Smuggling Activities (Amendment) Act, 1987 (23 of 1987); 6. Prevention of Illicit Traffic in Narcotic Drugs and Psychotropic Substances Act, 1988 (46 of 1988); 7. Conservation of Foreign Exchange and Prevention of Smuggling Activities (Amendment) Act, 1996 (15 of 1996)
- Status: In force

The Conservation of Foreign Exchange and Prevention of Smuggling Activities Act, 1974 (COFEPOSA) is an act of parliament passed in 1974 during the administration of Indira Gandhi, trying to retain foreign currency and prevent smuggling. It was an economic adjunct to the controversial Maintenance of Internal Security Act (MISA) which was enacted in 1971. Though MISA was repealed in 1978, COFEPOSA is still in force. COFEPOSA Act 1974 prescribes that the appropriate government shall establish advisory boards to assist the government on matters related to the detention of persons and prepare reports regarding the same. According to this section, the appropriate Government shall form an advisory board to perform the functions mentioned in clauses (4)(a) and (7)(c) of Article 22.
