= Nandi Awards of 2007 =

Indian Telugu film and TV awards ceremony

Nandi Awards presented annually by Government of Andhra Pradesh. First awarded in 1964.

== 2007 Nandi Awards Winners List ==
Category	Winner	Film
Best Feature Film	V. Eshwar Reddy	Mee Sreyobhilashi
Second Best Feature Film	Sekhar Kammula	Happy Days
Third Best Feature Film	O.Srinivas	Lakshyam (2007 film)
