= Simhadri (2014 film) =

- Directed by: Shivamani
- Written by: Shivamani
- Produced by: R. S. Gowda
- Starring: Duniya Vijay; Soundarya Jayamala
- Cinematography: R Giri
- Music by: Arjun Janya
- Production company: Mega Hit Films
- Release date: 2 October 2014
- Running time: 161 minutes
- Country: India
- Language: Kannada

Simhadri is a 2014 Indian Kannada-language action drama film directed and written by Shivamani, making his comeback after 4 years since his last film Jhossh released. The film stars Duniya Vijay and Soundarya Jayamala and is produced by R. S. Gowda under the banner Mega Hit films.

The film released on 2 October 2014 to the average response from the critics. Set in a rural background, the film moves around the brother - sister sentiments played by Vijay and Aishwarya respectively and the story unfolds the emotional journey of the siblings amidst troubles brought upon them.

== Cast ==
- Duniya Vijay as Simhadri
- Soundarya Jayamala as Simhadri's wife
- Aishwarya Sindhogi as Nandhini, Simhadri's brother
- Ramesh Bhat
- Padma Vasanthi
- Suchendra Prasad
- Kote Prabhakar
- Bank Janardhan

== Soundtrack ==
The music for the film is composed by Arjun Janya. The soundtrack consists of 4 songs of which two are written by K. Kalyan and one each written by Yogaraj Bhat and V. Nagendra Prasad.

=== Track list ===
No.	Title	Lyrics	Singer(s)	Length
1.	"Blacky Blacky"	V. Nagendra Prasad	Arjun Janya, Lakshmi Vijay	04:35
2.	"Nanna Neralu"	K. Kalyan	Madhu Balakrishnan, Anuradha Bhat	04:31
3.	"Dana Kaayokinta"	Yogaraj Bhat	Vijay Prakash	04:31
4.	"Thingalu Mulugidavu"	K. Kalyan	Shankar Mahadevan, Archana Ravi	04:21
