= Soundarya Jayamala =

Indian actress

- Born: 1990 or 1991 (age 35–36); Bangalore, India
- Occupations: Actress; model
- Years active: 2012–2014
- Spouse: Rushabh (m. 2025)
- Parents: Tiger Prabhakar (father); Jayamala (mother)
- Relatives: Vinod Prabhakar (half-brother)

Soundarya Jayamala (born 1990/1991) is an Indian former actress and model. She is the daughter of actor Tiger Prabhakar, and actress and politician Jayamala.

== Career ==
Soundarya made her starring debut in Godfather opposite Upendra. Her second film was Paru Wife of Devadas (2014), in which she played Parvathi, a kathak dancer and an aspiring journalist, and was cast opposite Srinagara Kitty. Expanding on her role, Soundarya stated: "The girl doesn't come with pre-conceived notions about love or marriage." Her performances was negatively reviewed by critics. Shashiprasad S. M. of Deccan Chronicle wrote that her "acting needs a lot of polishing."

Soundarya was to appear in Telugu films through Mr. Premikudu with Yasho Sagar, but the film went through production delays and was shelved following the lead actor's death. In 2013, she reportedly signed for a Tamil film titled Vendrum Vaa, to be directed by Selvaa, and starring opposite Jeevan. It was reported that she did not sign any Kannada films as of 2015, and it was speculated that she would appear in a Tamil film. Prior to the release of Simhadri, in an interview with The New Indian Express in September 2014, she stated, "I made the decision of being seen in fewer films. It is my choice and nobody else's. I come from a family good artistes and being in limelight constantly has never excited me. I take up projects only when I am enthusiastic about my role." She also expressed interest to become an entrepreneur and revealed in the same interview that she had a line of beauty products ready for launch. In 2017, The Times of India carried a report which said that Soundarya had was learning kathak. She was quoted saying, "I'm looking at bettering all my skills, especially since I wasn't really comfortable with my dancing. So, I'm taking time out to hone my skills before signing my next."

After her brief acting career, Soundarya returned to studies to pursue higher education. She obtained a bachelor's degree in zoology from Swansea University in 2020.

== Personal life ==
Soundarya was born to actors Tiger Prabhakar and Jayamala. She is the only child to her parents. Actor Vinod Prabhakar is her half-brother.

On 7 February 2025, Soundarya married Rushabh.

== Filmography ==
Year	Film title	Role	Notes
2012	Godfather	Divya	Suvarna Film Award for Best Debut Actress; Nominated—Bangalore Times Film Award for Best Debut Actress
2014	Paru Wife of Devadas	Parvathy Sreenivas Shastry "Paru"	
2014	Simhadri	Simhadri's wife	
