= Dil Maange More =

2004 Indian film by Anant Mahadevan

Dil Maange More!!!
- Theatrical release poster
- Directed by: Anant Mahadevan
- Written by: Anant Mahadevan; Javed Siddiqui; Kiran Kotrial
- Produced by: Nikhil Panchamiya
- Starring: Shahid Kapoor; Ayesha Takia; Tulip Joshi; Soha Ali Khan; Gulshan Grover; Zarina Wahab
- Cinematography: Amit Roy
- Edited by: Sanjib Datta
- Music by: Songs: Himesh Reshammiya; Background Score: Bikram Vicckey Goswami
- Production company: Fourth Wall Pictures
- Distributed by: Sahara One
- Release date: 31 December 2004
- Running time: 123 min
- Country: India
- Language: Hindi

Dil Maange More!!! (transl. The Heart Wants More!!!) is a 2004 Indian Hindi-language romantic comedy film directed by Anant Mahadevan and produced by Fourth Wall Productions. It stars Shahid Kapoor, Ayesha Takia, Tulip Joshi, Soha Ali Khan, Gulshan Grover, and Zarina Wahab. The movie was released on December 31st, 2004, and was a box office failure, though it boosted the careers of both Shahid Kapoor and Ayesha Takia.

== Plot ==
Dil Maange More!!! is the story of Nikhil Mathur's quest for true love. His passions are his town, Samarpur, a small hill station in Uttarakhand, and football. He is desperate to fall in love with one woman but ends up with three women in his arms, ready to swear undying love for him.

He is first shown in love with Neha Chopra, his girlfriend of four years. Neha, an ambitious girl, leaves their town to go to Mumbai to become a flight attendant. Nikhil follows her to bring her back. In a railway station in Mumbai, Nikhil bumps into Shagun Shah, a dominant, combative girl. She instantly shows her dislike towards him. Though the two part ways, fate has something else in store for them as he starts living above Shagun's house. Shagun always argues with him whenever they meet. On the other hand, he is on good terms with her mother, Kavita. He also gets to know that Shagun's father left them when she was 12, because of this she doesn't trust anyone and puts on a strong facade, though she is really soft on the inside. Nikhil continuously tries to convince Neha to return; he does not succeed. He lands a job in a music store, which is run by A.R. Rahman (a parody of A.R. Rahman), exactly opposite the institute where Neha is training. There, he meets coworker Sarah. Nikhil keeps trying to convince Neha but only gets rejection. In the end, on her first flight day, she breaks up with him. Dejected, he decides to return to Samarpur. Sarah, having heard about Samarpur from Nikhil, requests to accompany him. He agrees.

At Samarpur, Nikhil finds Sarah to be totally opposite of Neha. His mother likes her too, and he is relieved to know that Sarah is in love with Samarpur and won't have any problem settling there. Convinced that she also has some feelings for him, he decides to talk to Sarah about it. But suddenly, Sarah demands to leave Samarpur for some reason and promises to call him once she reaches Mumbai. But Nikhil never receives the call.

He comes back to Mumbai to find Sarah. However, he gets to know that Sarah already has a boyfriend, and she did everything to make him jealous, thinking that he is cheating on her, which disheartens Nikhil. He decides to finally leave Mumbai for good this time. He goes to say goodbye to Shagun's mother. There, he reads Shagun's computer diary and learns that she is actually in love with him. He couldn't take another heartache and decided to leave. Learning that Nikhil is leaving for ever, Shagun runs to the railway station and finds Nikhil sitting on a bench. Fate seems to be playing again; Nikhil's train didn't arrive that day. He decides to take one more chance and proposes to Shagun, which she accepts, but things turn as Neha returns, wanting him back. When Shagun sees Neha hugging Nikhil, she leaves fuming in anger, believing him to be a cheater just like her father. Nikhil tells Neha to leave him alone as he is in love with Shagun. Kavita (Shagun's mother) requests Shagun to talk to Nikhil for one last time and listen to his side of the story as well. A.R. Rahman, believing Sarah to be the reason for Nikhil's agony, tries to fix him up with Sarah, who has apparently returned after realizing that her boyfriend was a fraud. She hugs him, and again, Shagun, who has come to talk to Nikhil, sees them and goes berserk.

After hearing the whole story from Nikhil, A.R. Rahman arranges a party at a yacht; all the girls attend. They argue, and all three fall in the water. Nikhil quickly goes to help but only saves Shagun, who doesn't know how to swim. Meanwhile, Nikhil, thinking that he has lost Shagun forever, returns to Samarpur. Shagun finally realizes that Nikhil really loves her and follows him to Samarpur, where the two decide to live there happily ever after. As Shagun is confessing her love, we see Neha, Sarah, and A.R. Rahman saying that their plan was successful, implying that everything was just an act to get Nikhil and Shagun together.

== Cast ==
- Shahid Kapoor as Nikhil Mathur
- Ayesha Takia as Shagun Shah
- Tulip Joshi as Sarah Banton
- Soha Ali Khan as Neha Chopra
- Gulshan Grover as A. R. Rahman
- Zarina Wahab as Kavita Shah (Nikhil's Aunty & Shagun's Mother)
- Smita Jaykar as Mrs. Mathur, Nikhil's Mother
- Kanwaljit Singh as Mr. Chopra, Neha's Father
- Hiten Paintal as Bunty Kapoor

== Soundtrack ==
Dil Maange More!!!

Soundtrack album by Himesh Reshammiya
- Released: 17 November 2004
- Recorded: 2003
- Genre: Feature film soundtrack
- Length: 40:40
- Label: T-Series
- Producer: Himesh Reshammiya

All lyrics are written by Sameer Anjaan; all music is composed by Himesh Reshammiya.

Track listing
No.	Title	Singer(s)	Length
1.	"Gustakh Dil Tere Liye"	Sonu Nigam, Sunidhi Chauhan	5:07
2.	"Aisa Deewana"	Sonu Nigam, Alka Yagnik	5:13
3.	"O Makhna Ve"	Sunidhi Chauhan, KK	4:47
4.	"Shiqwa Bhi Tumse"	Sonu Nigam	6:38
5.	"Maine Chun Liya"	Udit Narayan, Shreya Ghoshal	5:24
6.	"Kubaku Mujhe Tu"	Shaan, Jayesh Gandhi	6:22
7.	"Aisa Deewana" (instrumental)		5:10
8.	"Shiqwa Bhi Tumse" (sad)	Sonu Nigam	1:55

== Reception ==
Ron Ahluwalia of PlanetBollywood.com gave the film 6/10, writing ″This movie is time pass material and ends 2004 the same way it started: pathetically. Watch it for Shahid and Ayesha ONLY, but there's a lot more to be looking forward to in 2005.″ Anupama Chopra of India Today wrote ″The tragedy is that the film's love lite formula works convincingly till the interval. Kapur has the charisma to carry the film; the girls range from above average to bad.″ Taran Adarsh of IndiaFM gave the film 2 out of 5, writing ″On the whole, DIL MAANGE MORE is an ordinary product that has its share of limitations.″ Manish Gajjar of BBC.com wrote ″One last word about the film - Dil Maange More is your average flick which you have all seen before. It's [sic] minor faults will not help the film in the long run as word of mouth goes around.″

== Nominations ==
- Nominated, Screen Award for Most Promising Newcomer – Female – Ayesha Takia
- Nominated, Zee Cine Award for Best Female Debut – Ayesha Takia
