= Paru Wife of Devadas =

- Directed by: Kiran Govi
- Written by: Kiran Govi
- Produced by: Krishna Deva Gowda; Mukhtar
- Starring: Srinagar Kitty; Soundarya Jayamala
- Cinematography: Ramesh Raj
- Edited by: Srinivasan Babu
- Music by: Arjun Janya
- Distributed by: Harshini Productions
- Release date: 27 June 2014
- Country: India
- Language: Kannada

Paru Wife of Devadas is a 2014 Indian Kannada romantic comedy film starring Srinagar Kitty and Soundarya Jayamala in the lead role. The film is directed by Kiran Govi and produced by Krishna Deva Gowda and Mukhtar. The music for the film is composed by Arjun Janya. The film was released on 27 June 2014.

The film, although takes the character names from the Sharat Chandra's Bengali novel Devdas, is depicted in an entirely different manner according to the director. The filming started early February 2013 at the Kanteerava Studios in Bangalore with a song sequence.

== Cast ==
- Srinagar Kitty as Devdas
- Soundarya Jayamala as Parvathy Sreenivas Shastry "Paaru"
- Neha Patil as Sukanya
- Siddaraj Kalyankar as Paaru's father
- Layendra as passenger in train
- Mohan Juneja as ticket collector in train
- Michael Madhu as passenger in train
- Veena Venkatesh
- V. Nagendra Prasad

== Soundtrack ==
The audio of the film was launched in March 2014 at hotel Citadel in Bangalore. Ace playback singer Manjula Gururaj and her husband musician Gururaj were present as the chief guest. It was revealed that the director had roped in local talents who were winners of talent shows for singing the soundtrack of the film. The music is composed by Arjun Janya, consisting of six tracks. While the five songs are written by Nagendra Prasad, one single is written by Jayanth Kaikini.

No.	Title	Lyrics	Singer(s)	Length
1.	"Kannalle Neenu"	Jayanth Kaikini	Sonu Nigam, Palak Muchhal
2.	"Haadu Haadu"	Nagendra Prasad	Nakul
3.	"O Devathe"	Nagendra Prasad	Sonu Nigam
4.	"Premana Premina"	Nagendra Prasad	Pragya, Anuradha Bhat
5.	"Paaru Paaru"	Nagendra Prasad	Harsha, Shwetha
6.	"Beke Beku"	Nagendra Prasad	Anuradha Bhat
Total length:				25:32

== Reception ==
A critic from Deccan Chronicle wrote that "However, there is very little to be thrilled about the movie as it moves on a snail pace embroiled with past events told through the lead female character".
