= Indian Idol (Hindi TV series) =

Indian singing reality show

- Genre: Reality television
- Created by: Simon Fuller
- Based on: Pop Idol
- Directed by: Yule Kurup; Vandy; Monisha Jaising Vaid; Partha Thakur; Vishal Mull; Niret Alva; Nikhil J Alva; Nivedith T Alva; Bhavna Israni; Indrajit Ray; Satish Datt; Ujjwal Anand
- Presented by: Mini Mathur; Hussain Kuwajerwala; Aman Verma; Meiyang Chang; Abhijeet Sawant; Asha Negi; Karan Wahi; Paritosh Tripathi; Manish Paul; Jay Bhanushali; Aditya Narayan; Udit Narayan; Haarsh Limbachiyaa
- Judges: Shreya Ghoshal; Anu Malik; Salim Merchant; Asha Bhosle; Farah Khan; Sonu Nigam; Alisha Chinai; Udit Narayan; Javed Akhtar; Sonali Bendre; Kailash Kher; Alka Yagnik; Shalmali Kholgade; Sunidhi Chauhan; Shekhar Ravjiani; Vishal Dadlani; Neha Kakkar; Javed Ali; Himesh Reshammiya; Manoj Muntashir; Sonu Kakkar; Kumar Sanu; Badshah
- Theme music composer: Julian Gingell; Barry Stone; Cathy Dennis; Badshah
- Country of origin: India
- Original language: Hindi
- No. of seasons: 17
- No. of episodes: 327

Production
- Executive producers: Anupama Mandloi (2010–present); Niret Alva (2005–2009); Nikhil J Alva (2005–2009)
- Producers: Namit Sharma (2010–present); Ashok (2008–09)
- Cinematography: Surindra Rao
- Editor: Kumar Priyadarshi (2007, 2012, 2013, 2014, 2015)
- Camera setup: Nitesh Choudhary
- Production companies: ARSenic's Business Empire (2010–present); Fremantle Media India; Miditech Pvt. Ltd. (2005–2009); Optimystix Entertainment (2004–2005)

Original release
- Network: Sony Entertainment Television
- Release: 30 October 2004 – present

Related
- Indian Idol Marathi; Telugu Indian Idol; Indian Idol Junior

Indian Idol is an Indian Hindi-language singing reality competition on Sony TV. It is an Indian version of the British show Pop Idol and is part of the Indian Idol series. It has aired on Sony Entertainment Television since 2004. Originally produced by Miditech Studios and its iconic producer-brothers, Niret Alva, Nikhil J Alva and Nivedith Alva, the series was an instant success. The brothers produced the first 5 seasons of the series and were instrumental in laying the foundation for its future success.

Indian Idol's production and taping take place in Mumbai, Maharashtra. It broadcasts on Saturdays and Sundays and digitally airs on SonyLIV application.

== Judges and hosts ==
Host
Guest Host
Judge
Guest Judge
Contestant

Cast member	Season																
Cast member	1 2004	2 2005	3 2007	4 2008	5 2010	6 2012	7 2013	8 2015	9 2016	10 2018	11 2019	12 2020	13 2022	14 2023	15 2024	16 2025	17 2026
Anu Malik	●	●	●	●	●	●			●	●	●	●					
Sonu Nigam	●	●							●					●			
Farah Khan	●	●							●								
Alisha Chinai			●														
Udit Narayan			●													●	
Javed Akhtar			●	●													
Sonali Bendre				●													
Kailash Kher				●													
Sunidhi Chauhan					●	●											
Salim Merchant					●	●											
Asha Bhosle						●											
Vishal Dadlani							●	●		●	●	●	●	●	●	●	
Shekhar Ravjiani							●										
Shreya Ghoshal							●							●	●	●	
Javed Ali										●							
Neha Kakkar		●								●	●	●	●				
Himesh Reshammiya											●	●	●				●
Sonu Kakkar												●					
Kumar Sanu														●			
Kavita Krishnamurti														●			
Badshah															●	●	
Neeti Mohan															●		
Aman Verma	●	●															
Mini Mathur	●	●				●											
Hussain Kuwajerwala			●	●	●	●		●						●			
Meiyang Chang			●	●													
Abhijeet Sawant	●				●												
Karan Wahi							●		●								
Mandira Bedi							●										
Asha Negi								●									
Paritosh Tripathi									●								
Manish Paul										●							
Aditya Narayan											●	●	●	●	●	●	●
Bharti Singh												●	●				
Haarsh Limbachiyaa												●	●			●	
Jay Bhanushali												●					
Rithvik Dhanjani												●					
Pawandeep Rajan												●			●		
Mohd. Danish												●			●		

== Series overview ==
Season	Episodes	Originally aired		Judges				No of contestants	Prize Money	Winner	Runner-up
Season	Episodes	First aired	Last aired	Judges				No of contestants	Prize Money	Winner	Runner-up
1	27	30 October 2004	5 March 2005	Anu Malik	Farah Khan	Sonu Nigam		12	₹50,00,000	Abhijeet Sawant	Amit Sana
2	28	21 November 2005	22 April 2006	Anu Malik	Farah Khan	Sonu Nigam		12	₹1,00,00,000	Sandeep Acharya	N. C. Karunya
3		4 May 2007	23 September 2007	Anu Malik	Javed Akhtar	Alisha Chinai	Udit Narayan	13	₹1,00,00,000	Prashant Tamang	Amit Paul
4		19 September 2008	1 March 2009	Anu Malik	Javed Akhtar	Sonali Bendre	Kailash Kher	14	₹1,00,00,000	Sourabhee Debbarma	Kapil Thapa
5	42	26 April 2010	15 August 2010	Anu Malik	Sunidhi Chauhan	Salim Merchant		13	₹50,00,000	Sreerama Chandra Mynampati	Bhoomi Trivedi / Rakesh Maini
6	30	1 June 2012	1 September 2012	Anu Malik	Sunidhi Chauhan	Salim Merchant	Asha Bhosle	16	₹50,00,000	Vipul Mehta	Amit Kumar / Devender Pal Singh
7 (Junior)		1 June 2013	1 September 2013	Shreya Ghoshal	Vishal Dadlani	Shekhar Ravjiani		11	₹25,00,000	Anjana Padmanabhan	Debanjana Karmakar
8 (Junior)		30 May 2015	6 September 2015	Shalmali Kholgade Sonakshi Sinha	Vishal Dadlani	Salim Merchant		13	₹10,00,000	Ananya Nanda	Nahid Afrin
9		18 December 2016	2 April 2017	Anu Malik	Farah Khan	Sonu Nigam		14	₹25,00,000	L. V. Revanth	Khuda Baksh
10	50	7 July 2018	23 December 2018	Anu Malik Javed Ali	Vishal Dadlani	Neha Kakkar		14	₹25,00,000	Salman Ali	Ankush Bhardwaj
11	40	12 October 2019	23 February 2020	Anu Malik Himesh Reshammiya	Vishal Dadlani	Neha Kakkar		16	₹25,00,000	Sunny Hindustani	Rohit Raut
12	75	28 November 2020	15 August 2021	Himesh Reshammiya	Vishal Dadlani Anu Malik	Neha Kakkar Sonu Kakkar		15	₹25,00,000	Pawandeep Rajan	Arunita Kanjilal
13	60	10 September 2022	2 April 2023	Himesh Reshammiya	Vishal Dadlani	Neha Kakkar		15	₹25,00,000	Rishi Singh	Deboshmita Roy
14	44	7 October 2023	3 March 2024	Shreya Ghoshal	Vishal Dadlani	Kumar Sanu		15	₹25,00,000	Vaibhav Gupta	Subhadeep Das Choudhary
15	48	26 October 2024	6 April 2025	Shreya Ghoshal	Vishal Dadlani	Badshah		16	₹25,00,000	Manasi Ghosh	Subhajit Chakraborty
16	82	18 October 2025	26 July 2026	Shreya Ghoshal	Vishal Dadlani	Badshah		18	₹25,00,000	Jyotirmayee Nayak	Tanishk Shukla
Legends Return	10	17 October 2026	TBA	Himesh Reshammiya				24			
17		TBA									

== Season synopses ==
=== Season 1 ===
- Judges

Anu Malik

Farah Khan

Sonu Nigam

- Host

Aman Verma

Mini Mathur

Top 12 Contestants

Name	Age	Hometown	Result	Place
Abhijeet Sawant	23	Mumbai	Idol	1st
Amit Sana	21	Bhilai	1st Runner-up	2nd
Rahul Vaidya	17	Nagpur	2nd Runner-up	3rd
Prajakta Shukre	16	Jabalpur	3rd Runner-up	4th
Ravinder Ravi	29	Ludhiana	Eliminated	5th
Aditi Paul	25	Chennai	Eliminated	6th
Mukesh Pancholi	26	Faridabad	Eliminated	7th
Harish Moyal	26	Itanagar	Eliminated	8th
Rahul Saxena	22	Ghaziabad	Eliminated	9th
Amit Tandon	25	Kolkata	Eliminated	10th
Vishal Kothari	21	Mumbai	Eliminated	11th
Priyanka Venkateswar	17	Mumbai	Quit	12th

=== Season 2 ===
- Judges

Anu Malik

Farah Khan

Sonu Nigam

- Host

Mini Mathur Aman Verma

Top 12 Contestants

Name	Age	Hometown	Result	Place
Sandeep Acharya	21	Bikaner	Idol	1st
N. C. Karunya	19	Hyderabad	1st Runner-up	2nd
Anuj Sharma	29	Himachal Pradesh	Eliminated	3rd
Ameya Date	26	Mumbai	Eliminated	4th
Antara Mitra	18	West Bengal	Eliminated	5th
Meenal Jain	20	Indore	Eliminated	6th
Ravi K. Tripathi	29	Uttar Pradesh	Eliminated	7th
Panna Gill	24	Punjab	Eliminated	8th
Monali Thakur	20	Kolkata	Eliminated	9th
Neha Kakkar	17	Rishikesh	Eliminated	10th
Yashashree Bhave	24	Satara	Eliminated	11th
Sagar Sawarkar	20	Mumbai	Eliminated	12th

=== Season 3 ===
- Judges

Javed Akhtar

Anu Malik

Alisha Chinai

Udit Narayan

- Host

Hussain Kuwajerwala

Mini Mathur

Top 13 Contestants

Name	Age	Hometown	Result	Place
Prashant Tamang	24	Darjeeling	Idol	1st
Amit Paul	24	Shillong	Runner-up	2nd
Emon Chatterjee	17	Kolkata	Eliminated	3rd
Ankita Mishra	17	Kanpur	Eliminated	4th
Meiyang Chang	24	Dhanbad	Eliminated	5th
Pooja Chatterjee	18	Dhanbad	Eliminated	6th
Deepali Kishore	18	Patna	Eliminated	7th
Abhishek Kumar	20	Mumbai	Eliminated	8th
Parleen Singh Gill	19	Ambala	Eliminated	9th
Charu Semwal	19	Dehradun	Eliminated	10th
Smita Adhikari	24	Kolkata	Eliminated	11th
Jolly Das	25	Kolkata	Eliminated	12th
Richa Aneja	17	Punjab	Eliminated	13th

=== Season 4 ===
The fourth season of Indian Idol was aired on Sony TV from 19 September 2008 to 1 March 2009. For the first time in Indian Idol history, there were two women among the top three finalists. Sourabhee Debbarma who hails from Agartala, Tripura won the competition and became the first female contestant to do so. By doing so, she also won a contract of Rs. 1 crore with Sony Entertainment Television and a TATA Winger. She released an album, Meherbaan, as per a contract with Sony. Kapil Thapa was runner-up while Torsha Sarkar finished third.

One of the contestants, Bhavya Pandit, received an offer to sing the song "Aaja Lehraate" for the film What's Your Raashee, alongside singer Gautam Mrinaal.

- Judges

Javed Akhtar

Anu Malik

Sonali Bendre

Kailash Kher

- Host

Hussain Kuwajerwala

Meiyang Chang

Top 14 Contestants

Name	Hometown	Result	Place
Sourabhee Debbarma	Agartala	Idol	1st
Kapil Thapa	Dehradun	1st Runner-up	2nd
Torsha Sarkar	Bhagalpur	2nd Runner-up	3rd
Rajdeep Chatterjee	Jamshedpur	Eliminated	4th
Remo Ghosh	Dimapur	Eliminated	5th
Bhavya Pandit	Pune	Eliminated	6th
Prasenjit Kosambi	Kolhapur	Eliminated	7th
Bhanu Pratap Singh	Jaipur	Eliminated	8th
Mohit Lawani	Delhi	Eliminated	9th
Kuldeep Singh Chauhan	Banda	Eliminated	10th
Priyanka Negi	Dehradun	Eliminated	11th
Gautam Mrinal	Jamui	Eliminated	12th
Tulika Ganguly	Faridabad	Eliminated	13th
Ananya Mishra	Lucknow	Eliminated	14th

=== Season 5 ===
- Judges

Anu Malik

Sunidhi Chauhan

Salim Merchant

- Host

Hussain Kuwajerwala

Abhijeet Sawant

Top 13 Contestants

Name	Hometown	Result	Place
Sreerama Chandra	Hyderabad	Idol	1st
Bhoomi Trivedi	Gujarat	Runner-up	2nd
Rakesh Maini	Mumbai	Runner-up	2nd
Swaroop Khan	Rajasthan	Eliminated	4th
Shivam Pathak	Gujarat	Eliminated	5th
Tia Kar	Mumbai	Eliminated	6th
Naushad Ali	Rajasthan	Eliminated	7th
Shashi Suman	Patna	Eliminated	8th
Arpita Khan	West Bengal	Eliminated	9th
Yashraj Kapil	Faridabad	Eliminated	10th
Manisha Karmakar	Kolkata	Eliminated	11th
Meghna Kumar	Jhansi	Eliminated	12th
Vishwas Rai	Allahabad	Eliminated	13th

Note: Sreerama, Rakesh, and Bhoomi were the top 3. Sreeram was crowned the winner without announcing the 1st and 2nd runner-ups.

=== Season 6 ===
The sixth season aired on Sony TV from 1 June 2012 to 1 September 2012. The winner of the sixth season was Vipul Mehta.

- Judges

Anu Malik

Sunidhi Chauhan

Salim Merchant

Asha Bhosle

- Host

Hussain Kuwajerwala

Mini Mathur

On 23 June 2012, the judges selected the top 16 contestants to perform in the Gala Rounds.

Contestants

Name	Hometown	Result	Place
Vipul Mehta	Amritsar	Idol	1st
Amit Kumar	Amritsar	Runner-up	2nd
Devender Pal Singh	Ludhiana	Runner-up	2nd
Poorvi Kautish	Chandigarh	Eliminated	4th
Sohini Mishra	Cuttack	Eliminated	5th
Amitabh Narayan		Eliminated	6th
Deeksha Toor	Delhi	Eliminated	7th
Deepak Maher		Eliminated	8th
Kaushik Deshpande	Mumbai	Eliminated	9th
Kritika Tanwar		Eliminated	10th
Charith Dixit	Chandigarh	Eliminated	11th
Ravi Kumar Mishra		Eliminated	12th
Ritika Raj	Patna	Eliminated	13th
Saumya Mishra		Eliminated	14th
Simran Kaur	Punjab	Eliminated	15th
Amrita Bharati	Bhubaneswar	Eliminated	16th

=== Indian Idol Junior Season 1 ===
- Judges

Vishal Dadlani

Shreya Ghoshal

Shekhar Ravjiani

- Host

Karan Wahi

Mandira Bedi

Top 11 Contestants

Name	Hometown	Result	Place
Anjana Padmanabhan	Bengaluru	Idol	1st
Debanjana Karmakar	Kolkata	1st Runner-up	2nd
Anmol Jaswal	Jammu and Kashmir	2nd Runner-up	3rd
Nirvesh Dave	Ahmedabad	3rd Runner-up	4th
Sugandha Date	Nagpur	Eliminated	5th
Sonakshi Kar	Kolkata	Eliminated	6th
Priyam Borpatragohain	Assam	Eliminated	7th
Akash Sharma	Haryana	Eliminated	8th
Sankalp Yaduwanshi	Moradabad	Eliminated	9th
Eman Chaudhary	Assam	Eliminated	10th
Aryan Das	Cuttack	Eliminated	11th

=== Indian Idol Junior Season 2 ===
Indian Idol Junior Season 2 started on 30 May 2015 and finished on 6 September 2015.

- Judges

Salim Merchant

Sonakshi Sinha replaced Shalmali Kholgade

Vishal Dadlani

- Host

Hussain Kuwajerwala

Asha Negi

Top 13 Contestants

Name	Hometown	Result	Place
Ananya Nanda	Bhubaneswar	Idol	1st
Nahid Afrin	Assam	1st Runner-up	2nd
Nithyashree Venkataramanan	Chennai	2nd Runner-up	3rd
Vaishnav Girish	Thrissur	Eliminated	4th
Moti Khan	Rajasthan	Eliminated	5th
Niharika Nath	Agartala	Eliminated	6th
Ranita Banerjee	Kolkata	Eliminated	7th
Sreelakshmi Belmannu	Bangalore	Eliminated	8th
Ajay Brijwasi	Mathura	Eliminated	9th
Yumna Ajin	Vengara	Eliminated	10th
Surendra Singh Panwar	Rajasthan	Eliminated	11th
Vidhi Jaswal	Jammu and Kashmir	Eliminated	12th
Shubhankar	Kolkata	Eliminated	13th

=== Season 9 ===
- Judges

Anu Malik

Farah Khan

Sonu Nigam

- Host

Karan Wahi

Paritosh Tripathi

Top 14 Contestants

Name	Hometown	Result	Place
L. V. Revanth	Visakhapatnam	Idol	1st
Khuda Baksh	Punjab	1st Runner-up	2nd
P V N S Rohit	Hyderabad	2nd Runner-up	3rd
Maalavika Sunder	Chennai	Eliminated	4th
Mohit Chopra	New Delhi	Eliminated	5th
Tajinder Singh	Faridabad	Eliminated	6th
R P Shravan	Chennai	Eliminated	7th
Manya Narang	New Delhi	Eliminated	8th
Hardeep Singh	Ludhiana	Eliminated	9th
Jeli Kayi	Itanagar	Eliminated	10th
Bharti Gupta	Ghaziabad	Eliminated	11th
Mansi Bhardwaj	Delhi	Eliminated	12th
Stuti Tiwari	Delhi	Eliminated	13th
Saumya Mishra	Renukut	Eliminated	14th

=== Season 10 ===
- Judges

Javed Ali

Neha Kakkar

Vishal Dadlani

- Former Judge

Anu Malik

- Host

Manish Paul

Top 14 Contestants

Name	Hometown	Result	Place
Salman Ali	Mewat	Idol	1st
Ankush Bhardwaj	Kotgarh	1st Runner-up	2nd
Neelanjana Ray	Alipurduar	2nd Runner-up	3rd
Nitin Kumar	Una	3rd Runner-up	4th
Vibhor Parashar	New Delhi	4th Runner-up	5th
Kunal Pandit	Mumbai	Eliminated	6th
Renu Nagar	Alwar	Eliminated	7th
Soumya Chakraborty	Kolkata	Eliminated	8th
Avanti Patel	Mumbai	Eliminated	9th
Saurabh Valmiki	Lakhimpur Kheri	Eliminated	10th
Biswajit Mohapatra	Bhawanipatna	Eliminated	11th
Krishnakali Saha	Tripura	Eliminated	12th
Indira Das	Kolkata	Eliminated	13th
Sonia Gazmer	Kolkata	Eliminated	14th

=== Season 11 ===
The 11th season started to air on 12 October 2019 on Sony TV. It was being hosted by singer Aditya Narayan. Neha Kakkar has returned as one of the judges on popular demand along with Vishal Dadlani and Anu Malik, who came back to the show as a judge after his suspension from the judging panel for Me Too allegations. He was then replaced by Himesh Reshammiya.

- Judges

Himesh Reshammiya replaced Anu Malik

Neha Kakkar

Vishal Dadlani

- Host

Aditya Narayan

Top 16 contestants

Name	Hometown	Elimination	Place
Sunny Hindustani	Bathinda	Idol	1st
Rohit Shyam Raut	Latur	1st Runner-up	2nd
Ankona Mukherjee	Bankura	2nd Runner-up	3rd
Ridham Kalyan	Amritsar	3rd Runner-up	4th
Adriz Ghosh	Murshidabad	4th Runner-up	5th
Shahzaan Mujeeb	Aligarh	Eliminated	6th
Rishabh Chaturvedi	Amritsar	Eliminated	7th
Stuti Tiwari	New Delhi	Eliminated	8th
Jannabi Das	New Delhi	Eliminated	9th
Azmat Hussain	Jaipur	Eliminated	10th
Chetna Bharadwaj	Ghaziabad	Eliminated	11th
Kaivalya Kejkar	Nagpur	Eliminated	12th
Subhadeep Das Chowdhury	Kolkata	Eliminated	13th
Pallav Singh	Ballia	Eliminated	14th
Nidhi Kumari	Jamshedpur	Eliminated	15th
Chelsi Behura	Cuttack	Eliminated	16th

=== Season 12 ===
The 12th season started on 28 November 2020 on Sony TV. The grand finale aired from 12 noon to 12 midnight on 15 August 2021. Pawandeep Rajan was declared the winner of the season and Arunita Kanjilal became the 1st Runner-up. This was the longest running season of Indian Idol.

- Judges

Vishal Dadlani

Neha Kakkar

Himesh Reshammiya

- Guest judges

Anu Malik

Sonu Kakkar

Although Vishal Dadlani, Neha Kakkar and Himesh Reshammiya were the original judges, when the shoot shifted out of Mumbai, then Vishal Dadlani, and Neha Kakkar couldn't join and makers replaced them by Anu Malik and Sonu Kakkar.

- Host

Aditya Narayan

- Guest Hosts

Bharti Singh

Haarsh Limbachiyaa

Rithvik Dhanjani

Jay Bhanushali

Aditya Narayan was the original host but Bharti & Harsh, Rithvik and Jay replaced him when he came out to be COVID +ve. Bharti and Harsh replaced him on February 28.

The judges have decided to do a power play for 9 weeks and let the audience decide who they want to see in the Top 8. Elimination will happen after the 9 weeks of power play. This season was extended because the contestants have given so much love and entertainment to the audience in the COVID pandemic. The 9 weeks of power play were completed and Anjali Gaikwad got eliminated.

Top 15 contestants

Name	Hometown	Result	Standing
Pawandeep Rajan	Uttarkhand	Idol	1st
Arunita Kanjilal	Kolkata	1st Runner-up	2nd
Sayli Kamble Patil	Mumbai	2nd Runner-up	3rd
Mohd Danish	Muzaffarnagar	3rd Runner-up	4th
Nihal Tauro	Mangalore	4th Runner-up	5th
Shanmukha Priya	Visakhapatnam	5th Runner-up	6th
Ashish Kulkarni	Pune	Eliminated	7th
Sawai Bhatt	Nagaur	Eliminated	8th
Anjali Gaikwad	Ahmednagar	Eliminated	9th
Nachiket Lele	Kalyan	Eliminated	10th
Sireesha Bhagavatula	Visakhapatnam	Eliminated	11th
Anushka Banerjee	Chandigarh	Eliminated	12th
Vaishnav Girish	Thrissur	Eliminated	13th
Samyak Prasana	Delhi	Eliminated	14th
Sahil Solanki	Hisar	Eliminated	15th

=== Season 13 ===
The Ground Auditions started in July 2022. The show started on 10 September 2022. The finale was held on April 2, 2023, with Rishi Singh being declared as the winner of the season along with Deboshmita Roy as the 1st runner up.

- Judges

Himesh Reshammiya

Vishal Dadlani

- Host

Aditya Narayan

- Former Judge

Neha Kakkar

- Guest Hosts

Haarsh Limbachiyaa

Bharti Singh

Top 15 Contestants

The judges have decided to do a power play for 4 weeks and let the audience decide who they want to see in the Top 7. Elimination will happen after the 4 weeks of power play. The 4 weeks of power play were completed and Navdeep Wadali got eliminated on February 26, 2023. The last contestant who got eliminated from the show was Senjuti Das on March 25, 2023, leaving the top 6 finalists to compete for the Indian Idol trophy.

Name	Hometown	Result	Place
Rishi Singh	Ayodhya	Idol	1st
Deboshmita Roy	Kolkata	1st Runner-up	2nd
Chirag Kotwal	Bhaderwah	2nd Runner-up	3rd
Bidipta Chakraborty	Kolkata	3rd Runner-up	4th
Shivam Singh	Vadodara	4th Runner-up	5th
Sonakshi Kar	Kolkata	5th Runner-up	6th
Senjuti Das	Kolkata	Eliminated	7th
Navdeep Wadali	Amritsar	Eliminated	8th
Kavya Limaye	Vadodara	Eliminated	9th (Note: There was a double elimination for Vineet Singh and Kavya Limaye.)
Vineet Singh	Lucknow	Eliminated	10th
Anushka Patra	Kolkata	Eliminated	11th
Rupam Bharnarhia	Amritsar	Eliminated	12th
Sanchari Sengupta	Kolkata	Eliminated	13th
Pritam Roy	Kolkata	Eliminated	14th
Shagun Pathak	Jharkhand	Eliminated	15th

=== Season 14 ===
The fourteenth season premiered on 7 October 2023, with the theme Ek Awaz Lakhon Ehsaas (lit. One Voice, Million Emotion). On 3 March 2024, the season concluded, with Vaibhav Gupta crowned as the winner, with Subhadeep Das Choudhary finishing as the runner-up.

- Judges

Kumar Sanu

Shreya Ghoshal

Vishal Dadlani

- Host

Hussain Kuwajerwala

- Guest Hosts

Aditya Narayan

Top 15 Contestants

Name	Hometown	Result	Place
Vaibhav Gupta	Kanpur	Idol	1st
Subhadeep Das Chowdhury	Kolkata	1st Runner-up	2nd
Piyush Panwar	Rajasthan	2nd Runner-up	3rd
Ananya Pal	Kolkata	3rd Runner-up	4th
Anjana Padmanabhan	Mumbai	4th Runner-up	5th
Adya Mishra	Faridabad	5th Runner-up	6th
Obom Tangu	Arunachal Pradesh	Eliminated	7th
Dipan Mitra	Kolkata	Eliminated	8th
Utkarsh Wankhede	Nagpur	Eliminated	9th
Menuka Poudel	Nepal	Eliminated	10th
Muskan Srivastava	Ghaziabad	Eliminated	11th
Mahima Bhattacharjee	Kolkata	Eliminated	12th
Surender Kumar	Rajasthan	Eliminated	13th
Maithili Shome	Mumbai	Eliminated	14th
Gayathry Rajiv	Kochi	Eliminated	15th

=== Season 15 ===
The fifteenth season premiered in October 2024, with the theme Jo Gayega, Wo Nazar Aayega (lit. Good Singers will get noticed). On 6 April 2025, the season concluded, with Manasi Ghosh crowned as the winner, with Subhajit Chakraborty finishing as the runner-up.

- Judges

Badshah

Shreya Ghoshal

Vishal Dadlani

- Guest Juges

Neeti Mohan

- Host

Aditya Narayan

Top 16 Contestants

Name	Result	Place
Manasi Ghosh	Idol	1st
Subhajit Chakraborty	1st Runner-up	2nd
Sneha Shankar	2nd Runner-up	3rd
Chaitanya Devadhe (Mauli)	3rd Runner-up	4th
Priyangshu Dutta	3rd Runner-up	4th
Anirudh Suswaram	5th Runner-up	6th
Myscmme Bosu	Eliminated	7th
Ragini Shinde	Eliminated	7th
Biswarup Banerjee	Eliminated	9th
Ritika Raj	Eliminated	9th
Mayuri Saha	Eliminated	11th
Ranjini Sen Gupta	Eliminated	12th
Srijan Porail	Eliminated	13th
Jyotiprakash Ojha	Eliminated	14th
Vastav Kumar	Eliminated	15th
Ipsit Pati	Eliminated	16th

=== Season 16 ===
The sixteenth season premiered on 18 October 2025, with the theme Yaadon Ki Playlist. This was the longest running season of Indian Idol for a long time. Indian Idol Season 16 Grand Finale has arrived on the 25th and 26th of July this year in 2026.

- Judges

Badshah

Shreya Ghoshal

Vishal Dadlani

- Host

Aditya Narayan

Name	Result	Place
Jyotirmayee Nayak	Idol	1st
Tanishk Shukla	1st Runner-Up	2nd
Manraj Veer Singh	2nd Runner-Up	3rd
Suhail	3rd Runner-Up	4th
Anshika Chonkar	4th Runner-Up	5th
Myscmme Bosu	5th Runner-Up	6th
Chaitanya Devadhe (Mauli)	Eliminated	7th
Abhishek Kumar	Eliminated	8th
Ankita Mahua Giri	Eliminated	9th
Diwakar Choubey	Eliminated	9th
Amritha Rajan	Eliminated	11th
Shreenidhi Shastry	Eliminated	12th
Sugandha Date	Eliminated	13th
Shreya Verma	Eliminated	14th
Abhijeet Sharma	Eliminated	15th
Banashree Biswas	Eliminated	16th
Manav	Eliminated	17th
Arfin Rana	Eliminated	18th

=== Season Spin Off ===
This season started on 17 October 2026-present.

- Judges

Himesh Reshammiya

- Host

Aditya Narayan

Top 24 Contestants (12 pairs)

Sr. No.	Name	Season	Previous Season Status	Current Season Status	Scores after 5 weeks
1.	Anshika Chonkar	16	4th Runner-Up	Competing	602
1.	Rishi Singh	13	Winner	Competing	602
2.	Ashish Kulkarni	12	Eliminated; 7th Place	Competing	614
2.	Sayli Kamble Patil	12	2nd Runner-Up	Competing	614
3.	Devender Pal Singh	6	1st Runner-Up	Competing	604
3.	Mayuri Saha	15	Eliminated; 11th Place	Competing	604
4.	Manraj Veer Singh	16	2nd Runner-Up	Competing	596
4.	Manasi Ghosh	15	Winner	Competing	596
5.	Nihal Tauro	12	4th Runner-Up	Competing	588
5.	Senjuti Das	13	Eliminated; 7th Place	Competing	588
6.	Salman Ali	10	Winner	Competing	615
6.	Mohd Danish	12	3rd Runner-Up	Competing	615
7.	Subhajit Chakraborty	15	1st Runner-Up	Competing	606
7.	Bidipta Chakraborty	13	3rd Runner-Up	Competing	606
8.	Swaroopp Khan	5	Eliminated; 4th Place	Eliminated on 22th November, 2026	594
8.	Ritika Raj	15	Eliminated; 9th Place	Eliminated on 22th November, 2026	594
9.	Tanishk Shukla	16	1st Runner-Up	Competing	580
9.	Myscmme Bosu	15	Eliminated; 7th Place	Competing	580
9.	Myscmme Bosu	16	5th Runner-Up	Competing	580
10.	Abhijeet Sawant	1	Winner	Competing	Scores frozen
10.	Prajakta Shukre	1	3rd Runner-Up	Competing	Scores frozen
11.	Ankush Bhardwaj	10	1st Runner-Up	Eliminated on 15th November, 2026	576
11.	Sireesha Bhagavatula	12	Eliminated; 11th Place	Eliminated on 15th November, 2026	576
12.	Amit Sana	1	1st Runner-Up	Quit on 14th November, 2026	(Note: Initially, Prajakta Shukre was paired with Amit Sana for first 4 weeks. Later, she was given a choice to swap her partner and she chose Abhijeet. Abhijeet's partner, Chetna, wanted to quit. Since, Amit had no partner left, he also quit.)
12.	Chetna Bhardwaj	11	Eliminated; 9th Place	Quit on 14th November, 2026	(Note: Initially, Abhijeet Sawant was paired with Chetna Bhardwaj for first 4 weeks. When Prajakta chose to pair up with Abhijeet, Chetna decided to quit the show owing to challenges she had to face when singing with Abhijeet.)
