= Indian Idol Legends Return =

Indian singing reality television series

- Genre: Reality television; Music
- Directed by: Saahil Chhabria
- Presented by: Aditya Narayan
- Judges: Himesh Reshammiya
- Country of origin: India
- Original language: Hindi
- No. of episodes: 10

Production
- Producer: Fremantle India

Original release
- Network: Sony Entertainment Television
- Release: 17 October 2026 – present

Related
- Indian Idol

Indian Idol Legends Return is an Indian Hindi-language singing reality television series and a spin-off of Indian Idol. The series premiered on 17 October 2026 on Sony Entertainment Television and is also available for streaming on SonyLIV.

The series features 24 former contestants from previous seasons of Indian Idol, who compete in pairs. Himesh Reshammiya serves as the Superstar Judge, while Aditya Narayan hosts the programme. Unlike the previous seasons, the contestants evaluate one another's performances alongside the judge.

== Format ==
Indian Idol – Legends Return brings together former contestants from different seasons of the franchise for a new musical competition. The initial competition features 24 singers divided into 12 pairs, also known as jodis. Each pair performs together and competes against the other pairs.

The performances are evaluated through peer scoring, in which the competing pairs assess one another, along with a score from Himesh Reshammiya. The format also includes a secret judge score.

The programme is structured in two phases. In the first phase, the returning contestants compete to determine the winning pair. In the second phase, the winning pair is expected to mentor new aspiring singers and participate in the audition process alongside the returning judges.

The series is promoted with the tagline "Sirf ek baar jeetna kaafi nahi hota, baar-baar jeetna padta hai".

== Judges and host ==
Himesh Reshammiya serves as the Superstar Judge of the series. Aditya Narayan is the regular host of the programme.

In November 2026, actor and television presenter Rithvik Dhanjani temporarily took over the hosting responsibilities while Narayan was away on international commitments. The arrangement was reported to be temporary, with Narayan continuing as the regular host.

== Contestants ==
The contestants are listed below according to their rankings and partnership status. The points shown are cumulative scores after five weeks of competition.

Sr. No.	Name	Season	Previous Season Status	Current Season Status	Scores after 5 weeks
1.	Anshika Chonkar	16	4th Runner-Up	Competing	602
1.	Rishi Singh	13	Winner	Competing	602
2.	Ashish Kulkarni	12	Eliminated; 7th Place	Competing	614
2.	Sayli Kamble Patil	12	2nd Runner-Up	Competing	614
3.	Devender Pal Singh	6	1st Runner-Up	Competing	604
3.	Mayuri Saha	15	Eliminated; 11th Place	Competing	604
4.	Manraj Veer Singh	16	2nd Runner-Up	Competing	596
4.	Manasi Ghosh	15	Winner	Competing	596
5.	Nihal Tauro	12	4th Runner-Up	Competing	588
5.	Senjuti Das	13	Eliminated; 7th Place	Competing	588
6.	Salman Ali	10	Winner	Competing	615
6.	Mohammad Danish	12	3rd Runner-Up	Competing	615
7.	Subhajit Chakraborty	15	1st Runner-Up	Competing	606
7.	Bidipta Chakraborty	13	3rd Runner-Up	Competing	606
8.	Swaroopp Khan	5	Eliminated; 4th Place	Eliminated on 22th November, 2026	594
8.	Ritika Raj	15	Eliminated; 9th Place	Eliminated on 22th November, 2026	594
9.	Tanishk Shukla	16	1st Runner-Up	Competing	580
9.	Myscmme Bosu	15	Eliminated; 7th Place	Competing	580
9.	Myscmme Bosu	16	5th Runner-Up	Competing	580
10.	Abhijeet Sawant	1	Winner	Competing	Scores frozen
10.	Prajakta Shukre	1	3rd Runner-Up	Competing	Scores frozen
11.	Ankush Bhardwaj	10	1st Runner-Up	Eliminated on 15th November, 2026	576
11.	Sireesha Bhagavatula	12	Eliminated; 11th Place	Eliminated on 15th November, 2026	576
12.	Amit Sana	1	1st Runner-Up	Quit on 14th November, 2026	
12.	Chetna Bhardwaj	11	Eliminated; 9th Place	Quit on 14th November, 2026	

=== Changes in contestants ===
During the ninth episode, Himesh Reshammiya offered the contestants an opportunity to change their partners. Chetna Bhardwaj expressed her wish to leave the competition, following which Abhijeet Sawant formed a new pair with Prajakta Shukre. Amit Sana and Chetna Bhardwaj subsequently left the competition.

== Weekly Performances ==
=== Week 1 - Grand Premiere ===
17th and 18th October, 2026
Performed on	Pair	Song	Scores given	HR's correction
Night 1	NIHAL - SENJUTI	"Jaane Jaan Dhoondhta Phir Raha"	89 (Note: Nihal and Senjuti were scored out of 100 (89 out of 100) initially as Abhijeet and Chetna were introduced later in the episode. Later, it was shown on the billboard at the end of episode number 2 that they were scored 98 out of 110 of which Himesh deducted 3 marks and the score was eventually reduced to 95.)	-3
Night 1	PRAJAKTA - AMIT	"Baazigar O Baazigar"	92	-6
Night 1	MANRAJ - MANASI	"O Balma" & "Nikamma Kiya Iss Dil Ne”	104	-
Night 1	SALMAN - DANISH	"Main Jahaan Rahoon"	109	-
Night 1	DEVENDER - MAYURI	"Nachde Ne Saare" & "London Thumakda"	109	-
Night 1	SUBHAJIT - BIDIPTA	"Teri Meri Meri Teri Prem Kahaani Hai Mushkil"	107	-
Night 2	SWAROOPP - RITIKA	"Tharki Chokro" & "Laal Peeli Ankhiyaan"	110	-
Night 2	ANSHIKA - RISHI	"Bang Bang (Title Track)"	102	-
Night 2	ABHIJEET - CHETNA	"Har Kisi Ko Nahin Milta”	102	-5
Night 2	ASHISH - SAYLI	"O Saathi Chal (Hawa Ke Sath Sath)	105	-1
Night 2	TANISHK - MYSCMME	"Pardesiya Yeh Sach Hai Piya”	102	-5
Night 2	ANKUSH - SIREESHA	"Achha Ji Main Haari" & "Chhod Do Aanchal Zamana Kya Kahega"	104	-1

=== Week 2 - Shilpa Shetty Special ===
Guest : Shilpa Shetty

24th and 25th October, 2026
Performed on	Pair	Song	Scores given	HR's correction
Night 1	DEVENDER - MAYURI	"Bumbro" & "Rind Posh Maal"	106	-
Night 1	ABHIJEET - CHETNA	"Aisi Deewangi"	91	-2
Night 1	MANRAJ - MANASI	"Dilli Waali Girlfriend"	103	-
Night 1	TANISHK - MYSCMME	"Chunari Chunari" & "Bijuriya Bijuriya"	107	-
Night 1	SALMAN - DANISH	"Mast Kalandar (Dil Da Mamla Hai Dilbar)”	110	-
Night 1	SUBHAJIT - BIDIPTA	"Chori Kiya Re Jiya"	110	-
Night 2	SWAROOPP - RITIKA	"Zor Ka Jhatka"	105	-1
Night 2	PRAJAKTA - AMIT	"Tere Naam Humne Kiya Hai”	94	-2
Night 2	ANSHIKA - RISHI	"Kaise Hua Tu Itna Zaroori Kaise Hua”	106	-
Night 2	ASHISH - SAYLI	"Manwa Laage"	110	-
Night 2	NIHAL - SENJUTI	"Baahon Ke Darmiyaan"	109	-
Night 2	ANKUSH - SIREESHA	"Ishaaro Ishaaro Mein”	98	-1

=== Week 3 - Diwali Celebration ===
31st October and 1st November, 2026
Performed on	Pair	Song	Scores given	HR's correction
Night 1	TANISHK - MYSCMME	"Bheegi Bheegi Raaton Mein Meethi Meethi Baaton Mein”	102	-1
Night 1	SWAROOPP - RITIKA	"Ghoomar"	96	-2
Night 1	MANRAJ - MANASI	"O Saki Saki"	104	-1
Night 1	ABHIJEET - CHETNA	"Zaalima"	100	-1
Night 1	ASHISH - SAYLI	"Tere Liye Hum Hai Jiye”	110	-
Night 1	SUBHAJIT - BIDIPTA	"Jadoo Hai Tera Hi Jadoo”	102	-1
Night 2	DEVENDER - MAYURI	"Bol Na Halke Halke"	100	-1
Night 2	SALMAN - DANISH	"Dil Pe Zakhm Khaate Hai, Jaan Se Guzarte Hai"	110	-
Night 2	PRAJAKTA - AMIT	"Jo Haal Dil Ka, Idhar Ho Raha Hai"	101	-2
Night 2	ANSHIKA - RISHI	"Dil Se Re (Title Track)	110	-
Night 2	ANKUSH - SIREESHA	"Chadhti Jawaani Meri Chaal Mastani"	103	-1
Night 2	NIHAL - SENJUTI	"Tum Kya Mile"	100	-1

=== Week 4 - Karisma Kapoor Special ===
Guest = Karisma Kapoor

7th and 8th November, 2026
Performed on	Pair	Song	Scores given	HR's correction
Night 1	ABHIJEET - CHETNA	"Mar Jaawan Mit Jaawan Mar Jaawan”	107	-
Night 1	SALMAN - DANISH	"Chhaiya Chhaiya”	109	-
Night 1	TANISHK - MYSCMME	"Gustakh Dil" & "Eeena Meena Deeka"	107	-
Night 1	MANRAJ - MANASI	"Hungama Ho Gaya"	109	-
Night 1	ASHISH - SAYLI	"Khullam Khulla Pyaar Karenge Hum Dono”	110	-
Night 1	SUBHAJIT - BIDIPTA	"Surili Akhiyon Wale"	110	-
Night 2	PRAJAKTA - AMIT	"Pardesi Pardesi Jaana Nahin"	102	-2
Night 2	ANSHIKA - RISHI	"Ae Dil Hai Mushkil (Title Track)	100	-1
Night 2	SWAROOPP - RITIKA	"Billo Rani Kaho Toh Abhi Jaan"	109	-
Night 2	DEVENDER - MAYURI	"O Rangrez"	110	-
Night 2	NIHAL - SENJUTI	"Dil Hai Ke Manta Nahin (Title Track)"	105	-
Night 2	ANKUSH - SIREESHA	"Main Agar Kahoon Tumsa Haseen"	99	-1

=== Week 5 - Rajshri Special ===
Guests : Sooraj Barjatya, Ayushmann Khurrana, Sharvari

Himesh Reshammiya gave Prajakta Shukre a choice to swap her partner and she chose Abhijeet Sawant to be her new partner. Chetna Bhardwaj quit the show owing to challenges she had face when singing with Abhijeet. Since Amit Sana had no partner remaining, he quit the show. Abhijeet - Prajakta : a new pair was formed. However, their scores were frozen by Himesh Reshammiya. As a result, the lowest of the remaining 10 pairs (Ankush and Sireesha) were eliminated.

On Sooraj Barjatya's request, Himesh Reshammiya increased the scores of the pairs this week instead of the usual deducting.

14th and 15th November, 2026
Performed on	Pair	Song	Scores given	HR's correction	Status
Night 1	ABHIJEET - CHETNA	"Ve Kamleya"	95	-	Chetna Quit
Night 1	SWAROOPP - RITIKA	"Beedi Jalaile"	107 (Note: Swaroopp and Ritika's score on 14th November was reduced from 107/110 to 97/100 as Chetna and Amit quit the show later.)	+80	Safe
Night 1	NIHAL - SENJUTI	"Yeh Prem Mol Liya"	110 (Note: Nihal and Senjuti's score on 14th November was reduced from 110/110 to 100/100 as Chetna and Amit quit the show later.)	+80	Safe
Night 1	PRAJAKTA - AMIT	"Albela Sajan"	No Scores Given (Note: Prajakta was given a preference by Himesh to either swap her partner and prove her worth or see the scores of her 5th performance with Amit. Prajakta chose to swap with Abhijeet.) (Note: The three performances before that of Prajakta's swapping were graded out of 110. All the performances after that were graded out of 100.)		Amit Quit
Night 1	ABHIJEET - PRAJAKTA	"Chura Ke Dil Mera"	No Scores Given		Safe
Night 1	ASHISH - SAYLI	"Sajan Tere Aane Se Mera Saawan Aaya Hai"	100	+80	Safe
Night 1	ANKUSH - SIREESHA	"Haye Rama Yeh Kya Hua"	96	+80	Eliminated
Night 2	SALMAN - DANISH	"Piya Re Thare Bina Lage Naahi Mara Jiya Re"	95	+82	Safe
Night 2	SUBHAJIT - BIDIPTA	"Chup Chup Ke Chori Se Chori"	98	+80	Safe
Night 2	MANRAJ - MANASI	"Dance Pe Chance" & "Aankh Marey"	97	+80	Safe
Night 2	ANSHIKA - RISHI	"Tum Jeene Ki Wajah Ho"	100	+85	Safe
Night 2	TANISHK - MYSCMME	"Meri Jaan Maine Kahan" & "O Haseena Zulfonwali Jaane Jahan"	88	+80	Bottom two
Night 2	DEVENDER - MAYURI	"Jai Ambe Bol"	100	+80	Safe

=== Week 6 - Karzzzz 18th Anniversary with Urmila Matondkar ===
Guest = Urmila Matondkar

21st and 22nd November, 2026
Performed on	Pair	Song	Scores given	HR's correction

=== Week 7 ===
Guest = Emraan Hashmi & Genelia D'Souza

28th and 29th November, 2026
Performed on	Pair	Song	Scores given	HR's correction

== Score Billboard ==
Pair	Week 1 (17/10-18/10)	Week 2 (24/10-25/10)	Week 3 (31/10-1/11)	Week 4 (7/11-8/11)	Week 5 (14/11-15/11)	Total	Week 6 (21/11-22/11)
SALMAN - DANISH	109	110	110	109	177 (+82)	615	
ASHISH - SAYLI	104 (-1)	110	110	110	180 (+80)	614	
SUBHAJIT - BIDIPTA	107	110	101 (-1)	110	178 (+80)	606	
DEVENDER - MAYURI	109	106	99 (-1)	110	180 (+80)	604	
ANSHIKA - RISHI	102	106	110	99 (-1)	185 (+85)	602	
MANRAJ - MANASI	104	103	103 (-1)	109	177 (+80)	596	
SWAROOPP - RITIKA	110	104 (-1)	94 (-2)	109	177 (+80)	594	
NIHAL - SENJUTI	95 (-3)	109	99 (-1)	105	180 (+80)	588	
TANISHK - MYSCMME	97 (-5)	107	101 (-1)	107	168 (+80)	580	
ABHIJEET - PRAJAKTA	Pair did not exist				Scores Frozen		
ANKUSH - SIREESHA	103 (-1)	97 (-1)	102 (-1)	98 (-1)	176 (+80)	576	Eliminated
ABHIJEET - CHETNA	97 (-5)	89 (-2)	99 (-1)	107	95	CHETNA Quit	
PRAJAKTA - AMIT	86 (-6)	92 (-2)	99 (-2)	100 (-2)	AMIT Quit		

Numbers within brackets indicate scores increased or decreased by Himesh Reshammiya. Numbers written outside the bracket are scores written after the judge's correction.

== Production ==
Indian Idol – Legends Return is produced by Fremantle in association with Sony Entertainment Television.

Saahil Chhabaria directed the series, and Fremantle India Television Productions Private Limited is credited as its production company.

The series was announced as a reunion of former contestants from different seasons of Indian Idol. It premiered on 17 October 2026 and airs on Saturdays and Sundays at 8:00 pm on Sony Entertainment Television, with episodes also available on SonyLIV.

== Broadcast ==
The programme premiered on 17 October 2026 on Sony Entertainment Television. It is also available on the SonyLIV streaming platform.
