= Taare Zameen Par (TV series) =

Indian singing reality show

- Genre: Reality
- Created by: Vipul D. Shah
- Directed by: Nikul Desai
- Presented by: Sugandha Mishra: Aakriti Sharma
- Judges: Jonita Gandhi; Tony Kakkar; Shankar Mahadevan
- Opening theme: Taare Zameen Par
- Country of origin: India
- Original language: Hindi
- No. of seasons: 1
- No. of episodes: 78

Production
- Producer: Vipul D. Shah
- Camera setup: Multi-camera
- Running time: 45–60 minutes
- Production company: Optimystix Entertainment

Original release
- Network: StarPlus
- Release: 2 November 2020 – 30 January 2021

Taare Zameen Par is an Indian kids singing reality show on StarPlus. It premiered on 2 November 2020 and ended on 30 January 2021. The series was hosted by the child actress Aakriti Sharma and singer Sugandha Mishra with Shankar Mahadevan, Jonita Gandhi and Tony Kakkar as the mentors.

== Format ==
The singing show was initially designed for 20 children who are mentored throughout their progress without elimination process till finale. However, after few weeks, the show had a change in its format and followed the elimination process where each day one low scorer was selected and every Saturday all low scorers compete to make their place. On that day, the lowest scorer is eliminated.

== Audition ==
The auditions were held digitally in the month of March 2020 where first 500 participants were recognized.

== Mentors ==
The show had composer and singer Shankar Mahadevan, playback singer Jonita Gandhi and composer, lyricist, singer and producer Tony Kakkar for mentorship.

== Production ==
The title of the series was taken from Aamir Khan's 2007 film, Taare Zameen Par, after getting rights from them.

In conversation with The Times of India, Sugandha said, "I share a strong connection with kids and really enjoy being around them. I decided to be part of the show because of its unique concept. I thoroughly enjoy hosting as much as I love acting and over the years, I have developed a certain penchant for hosting television shows. I am happy to be a part of a prestigious show and looking forward to witnessing some of the finest performances in this show by a set of equally dynamic kids.”

== Season 1 ==
- Judges
  - Tony Kakkar
  - Jonita Gandhi
  - Shankar Mahadevan
- Host
  - Sugandha Mishra
  - Aakriti Sharma

=== Top 20 Contestants ===
Name	Age (in years)	Hometown	Result	Place
Biren Dang	10	Gurgaon	Winner	1st
Laisel Rai	11	Jalandhar	1st Runner-up	2nd
Vansh Wadhwa	14	Moga	2nd Runner-up	3rd
Vishwaja Jadhav	12	Virar	Eliminated	4th
Ratnika Shrivastava	13	Jabalpur	Eliminated	5th
Aavya Saxena	11	Lucknow	Eliminated	6th
Prakhruthi Reddy	10	Ballari	Eliminated	7th
Anmol Raja	13	Hoshiarpur	Eliminated	8th
Pratyush Anand	12	Bhopal	Eliminated	9th
Khushi Nagar	11	New Delhi	Eliminated	10th
Rafa Yasmine	11	Malda	Eliminated	11th
Chaitanya Vaish	12	Patiala	Eliminated	12th
Angel Joseph	11	Ludhiana	Eliminated	13th
Gurman Singh Kohli	14	Gurgaon	Eliminated	14th
Ivana Semi	12	Pune	Eliminated	15th
Sourajoy Dev	11	Silvassa	Eliminated	16th
Marken Lollen	13	Itanagar	Eliminated	17th
Sajan Sharma	10	Deoghar	Eliminated	18th
Manav Heera	14	Ludhiana	Eliminated	19th
Raddujal Kashyap	13	Tejpur	Eliminated	20th

== Guests ==
- Udit Narayan
- Rupali Ganguly as Anupamaa
- Mika Singh
- Devoleena Bhattacharjee as Gopi Modi
- Rupal Patel as Kokila Modi
- Bhoomi Trivedi
- Gurdeep Singh
- Shaan
- Siddharth Mahadevan
- Shivam Mahadevan
- Zeenat Aman
- Richa Sharma
- Badshah
- Kanika Kapoor
- Terence Lewis
- Hemant Brijwasi
- Sonakshi Kar
- L. V. Revanth
- Neha Kakkar
- Rohanpreet Singh
- Afsana Khan
- Anjana Padmanabhan
- Sukhwinder Singh

== See also ==
- Sa Re Ga Ma Pa L'il Champs
- Superstar Singer
- The Voice India Kids
- Indian Idol Junior
- Love Me India
