= Sonakshi Kar =

Indian classical singer, playback singer(born 23 June 2003)

- Born: 23 June 2003 (age 23); Kolkata, West Bengal, India
- Genres: Indian Classical Music, pop
- Occupation: Singer
- Instrument: Vocals
- Years active: 2013–present

Sonakshi Kar (born 23 June 2003) is an Indian singer and live performer from Kolkata. She had participating in several singing reality shows such as Indian Idol Junior 2013, Sa Re Ga Ma Pa L'il Champs 2017 and Indian Idol season 13 (2022–2023).

== Early life and career ==
Sonakshi was born in Kolkata, India. And attended Maharishi Vidya Mandir School in Kolkata for her education and graduate in 2022. Then in 2023, she got admission to university and was awarded a scholarship from The Bhawanipur Education Society College.

On a musical journey, she learned music at home when she was 3 years old—then studied Hindustani classical music with Jayanta Sarkar from the age of 4. She also received training in Semi-classical music from Deep Chakraborty.

In 2011, she made her debut in the Bengali singing reality show 'Sa Re Ga Ma Pa L'il Champs' on Zee Bangla when she was 7 years old. After that in 2013, she participated in Indian Idol Junior Season 1 when she was 9 years old. In that competition, she ranked top 6th. In the year 2017, she appeared again in Sa Re Ga Ma Pa Li'l Champs 2017 when she was 13 years old. There she secured the position of 1st Runner-Up. In 2022-2023 she was in Indian Idol Season 13 on Sony TV and finished in 6th place.

After Indian Idol 13 ended, Sonakshi sang for Himesh Reshammiya in the album "Himesh Ke Dil Se " titled "Tera Chale Jaana" which was released on YouTube channel on 24 November 2023. Recently she sang a composition of the renowned music director from Bengal Debojyoti Mishra in a new launched serial TARA on Star Plus (2026).

== Television ==
Year	Title	Role	Notes	Ref.
2011	Sa Re Ga Ma Pa Bengla (Zee Bengla)	Contestant		
2013	India Idol Junior season 1 (Sony TV)	Contestant	ranked top 6th	
2014	Kaun Banega Crorepati Special Episode in Raipur (Sony TV)	Guest	stage performer	
2017	Sa Re Ga Ma Pa L'il Champs (Hindi)	Contestant	1th Runner-Up	
2017	India's Best Judwaah (Zee TV)	Guest		
2018	The Voice India Kids (&TV)	Guest		
2018	Dance India Dance L'il Masters season 4 (Zee TV)	Guest		
2021	Taare Zameen Par (StarPlus)	Guest		
2022	Indian Idol Season 13 (Sony TV)	Contestant	5th Runner-Up	
2024	THE 24th ITA AWARDS (StarPlus)	Guest	stage performer	

* In 2015, Sonakshi Kar participated in the singing competition I Genius Young Singing Stars Season 2 organized by Max Life Insurance in association with Universal Music India, she was the runner-up and sang on the album "Classics Revisited II".
