= Indian Idol Academy =

Music learning program

Indian Idol Academy is a music learning program that was launched during the Grand Finale of Indian Idol Junior Season 1 in September 2013. It is a joint venture of KarmYog Education Network and FreemantleMedia. Indian Idol Academy has programs which offer a variety of musical courses for both beginners and experts in the field of music, which are delivered through the OmniDEL Campus.

Indian Idol Academy has been launched in 25 cities.

== History ==
FreemantleMedia, the owners of the Idol brand behind the Indian Idol show, developed the platform for talent development together with KarmYog Education Network, a Kolkata based E-learning company.

== Courses ==
Indian Idol Academy offers courses at different levels.

=== Introductory Workshop: JAAAGO! ===
JAAAGO! is a musical workshop for children and their parents. It is followed by a digital audition.

=== Introductory Course: Music Discovery Program ===
Music Discovery Program is a music education course for beginners, which aims at helping learners to get to know their core area of interest in music.

It is a 1-year program which is divided into 4 levels of certification with main lessons and "Taleem lessons" (practice sessions). Each main lesson has 4 distinct sections: Gyaan, Swarleela, Palta Time and Song Time. Every main lesson is followed by Taleem lessons.

=== Choir Camp for the City Idols ===
Choir Camp – For the City Idols, is a musical camp conducted by certified music mentors of the Academy.

=== Music Mentor Certification Program ===
Music Mentor Certification program is a course designed especially for the music trainers.

=== Talent Development Program ===
Talent Development program is an advanced course designed especially for talented learners.

=== Learning from the Legends ===
Learning from the legends is a course designed by the Academy to provide direct tutoring for the learners by previous Indian Idol participants.

=== Pre-Audition Intensive Course ===
Pre-Audition Intensive Course is designed for grooming and training Indian Idol show aspirants by the certified mentors of the Indian Idol Academy.

== Campus ==
=== OmniDEL Campus ===
The OmniDEL campus is a combination of real and virtual spaces for learning.

=== Web Campus ===
Web Campus is an internet-based learning environment which provides individual learners with an archive of their lessons. The web campus is also used by the music mentors of Indian Idol Academy to schedule sessions, evaluate performance and assign tasks.
