= Indian Idol (Hindi TV series) season 14 =

Indian TV show

Indian Idol
- Season 14
- Indian Idol 14 Judges : Shreya Ghoshal, Vishal Dadlani, Kumar Sanu and Host : Hussain Kuwajerwala
- Hosted by: Hussain Kuwajerwala
- Judges: Kumar Sanu; Shreya Ghoshal; Vishal Dadlani
- Winner: Vaibhav Gupta
- Runner-up: Subhadeep Das Chowdhury
- No. of episodes: 44

Release
- Original network: Sony Entertainment Television
- Original release: 7 October 2023 – 3 March 2024

Season chronology
- ← Previous; Season 13 Next → Season 15

The fourteenth season of the Hindi-language music competition reality series Indian Idol premiered on 7 October 2023, on the Sony Entertainment Television.

The season was won by Vaibhav Gupta from Kanpur and Subhadeep Das Chowdhury was the runner-up.

== Production ==
The season was hosted by Hussain Kuwajerwala, marking his return to the show after a hiatus of 11 years. The judging panel saw the return of Vishal Dadlani, alongside new judges Shreya Ghoshal and Kumar Sanu, who replaced Neha Kakkar and Himesh Reshammiya. Saahil Chhabria directed the season, with production handled by Fremantle India.

== Auditions ==
Remote auditions took place for several days in 2023, as well as a number of open-call auditions, and from these, the producers selected the contestants who were then invited to audition in front of the judges.

Filming does not take place until the judges' audition round. The year, the auditions were filmed at the Film City in Mumbai.

Golden ticket and golden mic were distributed in the auditions, they both advanced the participants to the theatre round. However, this was the last season of golden mic as it was replaced by the platinum mic the next season.

== Top 15 contestants ==
Of the number of contestants, only fifteen made it to the gala round to start competing in the bi-weekly elimination competition. They are:

Contestant	From	Status
Vaibhav Gupta	Kanpur, Uttar Pradesh	Winner on 3 March 2024
Subhadeep Das Chowdhury	Kolkata, West Bengal	Runner-up on 3 March 2024
Piyush Panwar	Rajasthan	Third place on 3 March 2024
Ananya Pal	Kolkata, West Bengal	Fourth place on 3 March 2024
Anjana Padmanabhan	Mumbai, Maharashtra	Fifth place on 3 March 2024
Adya Mishra	Faridabad, Haryana	Sixth place on 3 March 2024
Obom Tangu	Arunachal Pradesh	Eliminated on 24 February 2024
Dipan Mitra	Kolkata, West Bengal	Eliminated on 18 February 2024
Utkarsh Wankhede	Nagpur, Maharashtra	Eliminated on 4 February 2024
Menuka Poudel	Nepal	Eliminated on 4 February 2024
Muskan Srivastava	Ghaziabad, Uttar Pradesh	Eliminated on 21 January 2024
Mahima Bhattacharjee	Kolkata, West Bengal	Eliminated on 7 January 2024
Surender Kumar	Rajasthan	Eliminated on 10 December 2023
Maithili Shome	Mumbai, Maharashtra	Eliminated on 26 November 2023
Gayathry Rajiv	Kochi, Kerala	Eliminated on 12 November 2023

== Elimination chart ==
Winner
Runner-up
Third place
Fourth place
Fifth place
Sixth place
Saved by the public votes from last week
Saved by the judges scores from this week
Eliminated

Indian Idol season 14 - Eliminations
Contestant	Pl.	Top 15	Top 14	Top 13	Top 12	Top 11	Top 10	Top 8	Semi-Final	Grand Finale
Contestant	Pl.	28/10–12/11	18/11–26/11	2/12–10/12	16/12–7/1	13/1–21/1	27/1–4/2	10/2–18/2	24/2	25/2-3/3
Vaibhav Gupta	1	Safe	Safe	Saved	Safe	Safe	Safe	Safe	Finalist	Winner
Subhadeep Das Chowdhury	2	Safe	Safe	Safe	Saved	Safe	Safe	Safe	Finalist	Runner-up
Piyush Panwar	3	Safe	Safe	Safe	Safe	Safe	Safe	Safe	Finalist	Third place
Ananya Pal	4	Safe	Safe	Safe	Safe	Safe	Safe	Safe	Finalist	Fourth place
Anjana Padmanabhan	5	Safe	Safe	Safe	Safe	Safe	Safe	Safe	Finalist	Fifth place
Adya Mishra	6	Saved	Saved	Safe	Saved	Saved	Safe	Saved	Finalist	Sixth place
Obom Tangu	7	Saved	Safe	Saved	Safe	Saved	Saved	Saved	Eliminated	
Dipan Mitra	8	Safe	Safe	Safe	Safe	Safe	Safe	Eliminated		
Utkarsh Wankhede	9	Safe	Safe	Safe	Safe	Safe	Eliminated			
Menuka Poudel	9	Safe	Safe	Safe	Saved	Safe	Eliminated			
Muskan Srivastava	11	Safe	Safe	Safe	Safe	Eliminated				
Mahima Bhattacharjee	12	Safe	Safe	Safe	Eliminated					
Surender Kumar	13	Safe	Saved	Eliminated						
Maithili Shome	14	Safe	Eliminated							
Gayathry Rajiv	15	Eliminated								

== Celebrity guests ==
The season saw a large number of celebrity guests who were present either to promote their films or to celebrate their legacy. The guests, in their order of appearance, include:

- Kavita Krishnamurthy
- Salim Sulaiman
- Richa Sharma
- Arshad Warsi
- Abhijeet Sawant
- Mahesh Bhatt
- Mithoon
- Armaan Malik
- Shilpa Rao
- Vicky Kaushal
- Sanya Malhotra
- Sana Sheikh
- Anuradha Paudwal
- Sadhana Sargam
- Ranbir Kapoor
- Rashmika Mandanna
- Karisma Kapoor
- Anand Milind
- Anandji V Shah
- Raj Babbar
- Salma Agha
- Nitin Mukesh
- Subhash Ghai
- Mahima Chaudhry
- Javed Ali
- Annu Kapoor
- Udit Narayan
- Sanjay Dutt
- Shatrughan Sinha
- Amit Kumar
- Zeenat Aman
- Abhijeet Bhattacharya
- Mohnish Bahl
- Moushumi Chatterjee
- Shahid Kapoor
- Kriti Sanon
- Sukhwinder Singh
- Javed Akhtar
- Rajat Sharma
- Urmila Matondkar
- Sonu Nigam
- Hrithik Roshan
