= Jo Jeeta Wohi Super Star =

- Genre: Reality
- Created by: Karan Agarwal; Vaibhav Modi
- Presented by: Mandira Bedi
- Judges: Farah Khan; Vishal–Shekhar
- Opening theme: "Jo Jeeta Wohi Super Star" by Kunal Ganjawala
- Country of origin: India
- Original language: Hindi
- No. of seasons: 2

Production
- Camera setup: Multi-camera
- Running time: 52 minutes
- Production company: Endemol India

Original release
- Network: STAR Plus
- Release: 11 April – 12 July 2008

Related
- Jo Jeeta Wohi Super Star 2

Jo Jeeta Wohi Super Star is an Indian reality television series which aims to bring the winners of 'all' singing reality shows completed previously and the runners-up together competed for the 'Superstar' title under 'one roof'. The series' grand-finale took place on 12 July 2008, Rahul Vaidya emerged as the winner.

== Cast ==
=== Host ===
- Mandira Bedi

=== Judges ===
- Farah Khan
- Vishal–Shekhar

=== Participants ===
- In this show, one player from Challenger team will cross over to champions team every Saturday on the basis Of Judges's score of Friday episode.

Winner	1st Runner Up	2nd Runner Up	This is Eliminated Contestant

Team 1 (Champions - Title Winner)	Team 2 (Challengers - Top 5 Contenders)	Team Change
Abhijeet Sawant	Amit Sana	6
Aishwarya Nigam	Amit Tandon	1
Debojit Saha	Harshit Saxena	3
Late Ishmeet Singh Sodhi	Himani Kapoor	7
Ruprekha Banerjee	Neha Kakkar	Never
Ujjaini Mukherjee	Prajakta Shukre ... (Wild Card)	1
	Priyani Vani	4
	Rahul Vaidya	2
	Ravindra Ravi	Never
	Sumitra Iyer	Never
	Toshi Sabri	8
	Vinit Singh	5
	Rex D'Souza ... Entered from episode 11	Never
	Ameya Date ... Entered from episode 11	Never

== Guest appearances ==
- Shaan
- Mika Singh
- Mahalakshmi Iyer
- Udit Narayan
- Harman Baweja
- Sukhwinder Singh
- Richa Sharma

=== Grand Finale ===
- Neeraj Shridhar
- Sonu Nigam
- Bipasha Basu
- Vidya Balan
- Shahid Kapoor

==== Guest from Star Parivaar ====
- Hussain Kuwajerwala ... Kumkum (a.k.a. Sumit Wadhawa)
- Juhi Parmar ... Kumkum (a.k.a. Kumkum Wadhawa)
- Parul Chauhan ... Sapna Babul Ka...Bidaai (a.k.a. Ragini Khanna)
- Ishita Dhawan ... Sapna Babul Ka...Bidaai (a.k.a. Maalti Khanna)
- Angad Hasija ... Sapna Babul Ka...Bidaai (a.k.a. Alekh Rajvansh)
- Sarita Joshi ... Baa Bahoo Aur Baby (a.k.a. Godavari Thakker)
- Lubna Salim ... Baa Bahoo Aur Baby (a.k.a. Leela Thakker)
- Kamlesh Oza ... Baa Bahoo Aur Baby (a.k.a. Hemal Thakker)
- Ali Hasan ... Great Indian Laughter Challenge
- Irfan Malik ... Great Indian Laughter Challenge
- Kapil Sharma ... Great Indian Laughter Challenge
- Chandan Prabhakar ... Great Indian Laughter Challenge
- Aishwariya Majumdar ... Amul Star Voice of India' (Winner)
- Anwesha Datta Gupta ... Amul Star Voice of India' (Runner Up)
- Harshad Chopda as Prem Juneja from Kis Desh Mein Hai Meraa Dil
- Additi Gupta ... Kis Desh Mein Hai Meraa Dil (a.k.a. Heer Maan / Juneja)

== Second Season ==
Main Page: Jo Jeeta Wohi Super Star 2

The second season of Jo Jeeta Wohi Superstar started broadcasting on March 31, 2012. The judges are Shantanu Moitra, Swanand Kirkire, and Shaan. The Contestants are

Champions

- Aneek Dhar
- Sreeram Chandra
- Hemant Brijwasi
- Akanksha Sharma
- Sanchita Bhattacharya
- Vaishali Mhade

Challengers

- Sharib Sabri
- Mohammed Irfan
- Anweshaa Datta Gupta
- Rehman Ali
- Shivamm Pathak
- Sonia Sharma
- Harpreet Deol
- Rajdeep Chatterjee
- Torsha Sarkar
- Nihira Joshi

== See also ==
- Jo Jeeta Wohi Super Star 2
