= Amit Paul =

Indian singer

- Born: Shillong, Meghalaya, India
- Genres: Pop, classical
- Occupations: Playback singer, Indian Idol season 3 runner-up
- Instrument: Vocals
- Years active: 2007–present

Amit Paul (born in Shillong, India) is an Indian singer. His career started by being runner up on Indian Idol season 3. He has become a budding playback singer in the Hindi film industry as well as Bengali and Nepali movies.

== Early years ==
Paul's parents are Deepak Paul and Jaya Paul. They have a decades-old family garments business in Shillong which was established by his grandfather, later maintained by his father and paternal uncles. Paul completed his studies in Shillong and is an alumnus of St. Peter's school. From an early age, he had aspired to be a playback singer, but was never formally trained.

== Indian Idol ==
Paul participated in the third season of Indian Idol. After being eliminated, he was brought back as a wild card entry. He was one of the most popular contestants and was tagged as "lover boy of India" for his soulful voice and singing.

== Continuing career ==
After Idol, Paul reappeared on Indian television in the new game show "Ek Se Badhkar Ek". This saw Paul paired with Rajshree Thakur as a singer-dancer combo. The pair lasted until the 9th week, when Thakur had to quit on doctor's orders.

Paul also appeared on K for Kishore, a song contest in which participants must try and sing like the well known Indian singer Kishore Kumar. Paul appeared as a challenger but exited the show because of a minor illness during that time.

He has performed worldwide in a number of concerts since completing Indian Idol. His overseas tours have included the US, the UK, Hong Kong, South Africa, Kenya, Ghana, Canada, Saudi Arabia, Bhutan, Israel, Singapore, Thailand, Kuwait, Nepal, Dubai, Bangladesh, Belgium, and Switzerland.

Paul has begun to realize his dream to sing as a playback artist. He debuted in Luck by Chance with the soft, romantic number "Pyar ki Daastan", with Mahalaxmi Iyer as his co-singer. The song was written by the legendary lyricist Javed Akhtar. Reviews of the track were positive, and the song did well in the charts.

He is one of the few Indian Idol contestants to give a chartbuster song like "Pyar ki dastan". Several of his songs are under production.

Alongside music, Paul has his own business in various sectors and is a socialite in the Northeast. He is an active member of various social enterprises and supports causes such as children's education, disabled children and women empowerment. He has done many charity shows to support the underprivileged at home and abroad. He has also been made the state brand ambassador for North Bengal by Chief Minister Mamata Banerjee. Paul believes in peace and prosperity and continues to keep good impact on the society and encourage youngsters for unity, peace and prosperity. He also took part as a celebrity judge in the local talent contest, "Arunachal's got Talent". He was also one of the judges in Northeast Idol 2019.

== Effect on Meghalaya ==
The populace within the state of Meghalaya has long been divided. The discord between tribal and non-tribal members of the state has resulted in harsh words between the two, as well as outbreaks of violence. Paul's success brought fame to the region, and created a sense of unity between the divide for a brief period of time where all were voting for him. His success has allowed both sides to come together and brought a sense of peace to the state. The Meghalaya Government made him the state's Brand Ambassador of Peace, Communal Harmony and Excellence.

== Famous songs ==
- "Pyaar Ki Dastaan" (Luck By Chance)
