= Amrita Bharati =

Indian Playback Singer

- Amrita Bharati Performing in 2022

Background information
- Born: Bhubaneswar, Odisha, India
- Genres: Indian Classical Music, Pop, Filmi, Regional, Sufi, Devotional, Bollywood
- Occupations: Singer, composer, songwriter
- Years active: 2009–present
- Labels: Times Music, Zee Music, T Series, Griebs Music, Tarang Music, Saregama, Star Plus
- Website: www.imdb.com/name/nm11548125/

Amrita Bharati is an Indian playback Singer from Odisha. She was in top twelve of Sony TV Indian Idol Season 6 which was aired on Sony TV. Amrita singing debut in Ollywood was in 2012 and Bollywood in 2019.

== Career ==
Amrita Bharati began her singing career at the age of five. In 2010, she received the Rajiv Gandhi Youth Singer Award. In 2011, she was the runner-up in Voice of Odisha Season 1, a reality show conducted by Tarang TV.

She went on to establish her presence in the Odia film industry, lending her voice to films such as Sandehi Priyatama, Raasta, Sundergarh Ra Salman Khan, and Tuh Kahide I Love You. For the title track of Raasta, she received the Best Female Singer (Odia) award in 2016 from Cinema Sansar & Showtime.

Bharati made her Bollywood singing debut in 2019 with the music video Vande Mataram, produced by Zee Music Company.She later contributed as a playback singer for the song Gyan Do in Inspector Avinash on JioCinema, and also performed a promotional track for Ghum Hai Kisikey Pyaar Meiin on StarPlus.

In 2026, she expanded her work across regional and digital platforms, recording Dhoop Jaye Dewar for the web series Chiraiya and the Marathi song Bhagubai Kai Bol Na for the film Bhagubai. Her folk song Amma Puchdi was featured in a Pakistani folktales series by director Eman Munir. She has also sung Rahguzar for the Pakistani film Ismail.

In addition to her work in films and web series, Bharati has recorded vocals for several national advertising campaigns, including those for Vaseline, Parachute, IIFL Finance, Indian Oil Corporation, and Orient Cement.

== Filmography ==
Year	Film	Song	Co-artist	Composer(s)	Language	Reference(s)
2012	Mun	Chiki Chiki Gori Tora	Vinod Rathod	Bibhuti Bhusan Gadanayak	Odia	
2012	Mun	Hey Prabhu Mate	Solo	Bibhuti Bhusan Gadanayak	Odia	
2013	Sandehi Priyatama	Basara Rati	Goutam Giri	Bidyut Roy	Odia	
2014	Raasta	Eh Raasta	Bishnu Mohan Kabi	Nishikanta Dalabehera	Odia	
2018	Sundergarh Ra Salman Khan	Lets Celebrate Raja	Satyajit, Biswajit, Rashmita	Abhijit Majumdar	Odia	
2019	Tu Kahide I Love You	Ae Prema Khali Tori Pain (Female)	Solo	Durga, Nabs & Saroj	Odia	
2023	Inspector Avinash	Gyan Do	Solo	Vijay Verma	Hindi	
2025	Ismail	Rahguzar	Solo	Lena Matienko	Urdu	
2026	Chiraiya	Dhoop Jaye Dewar	Solo	Raja Narayan Deb	Hindi	
2026	Bhagubai	Bhagubai Kai Bol Na	Solo	Kashi Kashyap	Marathi	

== Discography ==
Year	Song	Co-artist	Composer(s)	Label	Language	Reference(s)
2018	Hay Mausi	Solo	Siban Swain	Divyashree Production	Odia	
2019	Saajna Reprise	Solo	Vighnanz The Band, Nabs & Saroj	Amara Muzik	Odia	
2019	Barshaa Bhijaa Raati	Bankim Patel	Bankim Patel	BnR Films	Odia	
2019	Vande Mataram	Hemant Brijwasi, Salman Ali, Aneek Dhar, Raja Hasan, Nitin Kumar, Purusharth Jain	Rahul Bhatt	Zee Music	Hindi	
2020	Hari Om Hari	Solo	Tuhinanshu Chaturvedi	Saregama	Hindi	
2021	Aye Dil	Arun Kumar Nikam	Arun Kumar Nikam	T Series	Hindi	
2022	Dholi Da Dhol Bajaa	Amit Gupta	Biplab Dutta	Muzzic Box	Hindi	
2022	Mohabbat (Female Version)	Solo	Vivek Kar	Griebs Music	Hindi	
2023	Nai Jaana	Solo	Amjad Nadeem	Zee Music	Punjabi	
2023	Ve Gurdat Deya Lalla	Solo	Amjad Nadeem	Zee Music	Punjabi	
2023	Mere Yaar Sun	Solo	Amjad Nadeem	Raw Stock	Hindi	
2023	Panchi Udd Gaya	Solo	Sundeep Gosswami & Kanchhan Srivas	Zee Music	Hindi	
2023	Baarish Ki Boonde	Solo	Raj Kumar Sengupta	Black & White Records	Hindi	
2023	Kanha Bansi Bajao Tum	Solo	Marc D Muse	Marc D Muse	Hindi	
2023	Patao Na Mujko	Solo	Denis Vallaban A.	Shifa Music	Hindi	
2024	Pyari Maa	Solo	Arun Kumar Nikam	Any Choice Films	Hindi	
2024	Maa Hu Mein	Solo	Marc D Muse	Marc D Muse	Hindi	
2024	Ghum Hai Kisikey Pyaar Meiin (Promo Song)	Solo	Raajeev V Bhalla	Star Plus	Hindi	
2024	Manmarziyaan	Aabhik Ghosh	Rajkumar Sengupta & Aabhik Ghosh	Zee Music	Hindi	
2024	Kanha Mai Hoon Tu Radha Hai	Amit Mutreja	Manoj Sharrma	Saregama Bhakti	Hindi	
2025	Main Wohi	Solo	Santhan Anebajagane	NXT Music	Hindi	
2026	Mo Hrudaya Re	Solo	Sanjay Patra	Kukuduku Music	Odia	
2026	Kona Kona	Solo	Sanjay Patra	Kukuduku Music	Odia	
2026	Inikkira Palla	Manoj Sharrma	Manoj Sharrma	123Musix	Tamil	

== Singles ==
- Papa Ki Pari (2017)
- Huzoor Shukriya (2020)
- Tu Hi Bata (2020)
- Tishnagi (2021)
- Teri Baatein (2022)
- Chaap Tilak (Lounge Version) (2022)
- Shiv Panchakshar Stotra (2023)
- Jagannath Kicchi Magu Nahin Tote (2023)
- Gunjega India – World Cup Anthem (2023)
- Teri Meri Kahani (2024)
- Achyutam Keshavam (2024)
- Hanuman Chalisa – Lullaby Version (2025)
- Shiv Kailasho Ke Vasi - Lofi Version (2026)
