= Ravi Tripathi =

Ravi K. Tripathi
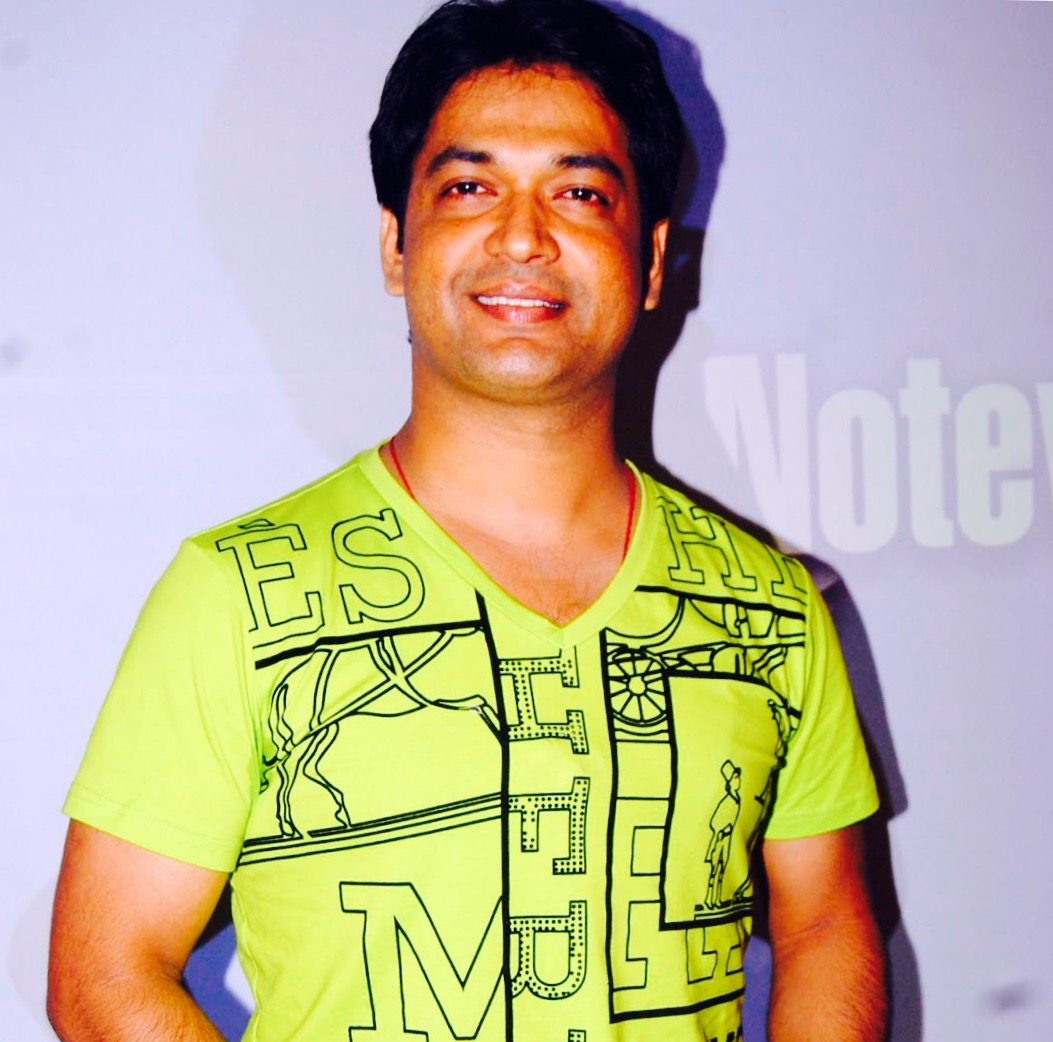

Background information
- Born: Pratapgarh, Uttar Pradesh, India
- Genres: Bollywood
- Years active: 2006–present
- Labels: Times Music, Fountain Music Company, WorldWide Records
- Website: www.ravitripathi.com

Ravi K. Tripathi is an Indian playback singer, composer and music director. He competed on the television music reality show Indian Idol in season 2 in 2006. He was the only Indian artist to have been invited to perform and represent India at the closing ceremony of the 2010 Asian Games, in Guangzhou, China.

== Career ==
In 2005, Tripathi participated in the second season of Indian music reality show Indian Idol and was the top finalist. He hosted the singing reality show Close Up Performer on Doordarshan in 2008. His first solo album, Baatain, was released on 26 February 2009 by Times Music and received a positive response. In that same year, he made his Bollywood debut with the song "India Se Aaya Tera Dost" from the film Chandni Chowk to China.

In 2010, Tripathi was invited to perform at the closing ceremony of the Asian Games held in Guangzhou, China, the only Indian singer after K S Chithra to have entertained a Chinese audience. His second album, Sri Siddhivinayak Morya, was released in 2009 by Worldwide Records. He has also lent his voice to some TV shows including Ramayan.

=== Television ===
Year	Show	Role	Channel
2006	Indian Idol (season 2)	Participant (Top 6 finalist)	Sony TV
2008	Close-up Performer	Host	Doordarshan

=== Discography ===
Year	Song	Film/Album	Note
2009	"India se aya tera dost"	Chandni Chowk to China	singer
2016		Red Affair	Music director
2017		Red Signal	Music director and singer
2017		Laajwanti Online	Music director

== Filmography ==
Year	Film	Role	Language
2013	Boji ayee hmaar angna	Kishan (male lead)	Bhojpuri

== Awards and recognition ==
- In November 2016, he received Uttar Pradesh Ratan Award by Shivpal Singh Yadav for his contribution to the music industry.
