= Yashashree Bhave =

Indian singer

- Born: 5 August 1981 (age 44); Satara, Maharashtra, India
- Occupation(s): Singer, actor, music director
- Instrument: Vocals
- Years active: 2006–present
- Labels: Zee Music Company; Sony Music Entertainment; Yashi Tracks
- Website: yashashreebhave.com

Yashashree Bhave is an Indian singer from Satara, Maharashtra. She was a participant in Indian Idol Season 2.

== Early life ==
Born in 1981, Bhave hails from Satara, Maharashtra. She started her career in Nagpur and currently lives in Mumbai. She has performed at several stage shows and worked on various projects with leading artists of the industry.

In 2001, Bhave was the runner-up in Sa Re Ga Ma Pa, aired on Zee Marathi.

== Discography ==
- Album: Mai Toh Ho Gai Re Sajna Teri – Zee Music Company
- Album: Chalo Jaye Maiyya Ke Dwar
- "Ae Dil-E-Nadan" (Album: Indian Idol 2)
- "Woh Pehli Baar" (Album: Indian Idol 2)

=== Playback Singer ===
- Chooti Se Umer (Movie: Ek Hakikat Ganga
- Movie: Bhala Manus

== Indian Idol 2 performances ==
=== Audition ===
- Ruke Ruke se Kadam (Lata Mangeshkar)
  - The judges liked it, especially Sonu Nigam.

=== Theater round ===
- Piya Bawri (Asha Bhonsle)
  - The judges appreciated her performance, particularly the sargam.
- Aisa Lagta Hai Jo Na Hua (Alka Yagnik)
  - Sonu Nigam said, "I am very happy to hear you sing this song". Anu Malik, the music director of the song, was also happy.
- Kehna hi Kya (K.S Chithra)
  - Sonu Nigam couldn't believe that Bhave was singing the song. He felt like Chithra was only singing it.

=== Piano round ===
- Aayiye Aajaayiye (Anuradha Sriram)
