= Short Kut =

- Theatrical release poster
- Directed by: Neeraj Vora
- Written by: Anees Bazmee
- Dialogues by: Neeraj Vora
- Based on: Udayananu Tharam by Sreenivasan
- Produced by: Anil Kapoor
- Starring: Akshaye Khanna; Arshad Warsi; Amrita Rao
- Cinematography: Ashok Mehta
- Edited by: Rajeev Gupta
- Music by: Songs: Shankar–Ehsaan–Loy; Score: Salim–Sulaiman
- Production company: Anil Kapoor Film Company
- Distributed by: Indian Films
- Release date: 10 July 2009
- Running time: 156 minutes
- Country: India
- Language: Hindi

Shortkut (also known as Short Kut: The Con Is On) is a 2009 Indian Hindi-language comedy film directed by Neeraj Vora and produced by Anil Kapoor under Anil Kapoor Films Company. The film stars Akshaye Khanna, Arshad Warsi, and Amrita Rao in lead roles. It was released on 10 July 2009 to negative reviews from critics.

The film was an uncredited remake of the Malayalam-language film Udayananu Tharam, itself inspired from the 1999 American comedy film Bowfinger.

== Plot ==
Shekhar, an assistant director, hopes to write and direct his own films. His friend Raju, a struggling actor, has been waiting for Shekhar to write a film script so that he can star in his film. However, when Shekhar rejects him as the film's lead, Raju decides to steal Shekhar's script, star in the film himself and release it without crediting Shekhar. The film is released and becomes a blockbuster, propelling Raju to overnight stardom. A heartbroken Shekhar, experiences a break-up with his girlfriend Mansi. Nonetheless, he writes a new and better script and wants Raju to star in it, however when Raju rejects the script, Shekhar decides to secretly film Raju without his knowledge. Shekhar and his low-budget film crew follow Raju around everywhere to complete their film covertly. Eventually, when the film is released, Raju's role attracts embarrassment and humiliation but the film itself succeeds and Shekhar finally enjoys a taste of success in the film industry. In the end, an unfazed Raju decides not to change his ways but to again steal someone else's script.

== Cast ==
- Akshaye Khanna as Shekhar Giriraj
- Arshad Warsi as Rajesh "Raju" / King Kumar
- Amrita Rao as Mansi
- Chunky Panday as Guru Kapoor
- Tiku Talsania as Tolani
- Siddharth Randeria as Kantibhai
- Ali Asghar as Vikram “Vicky”, Mansi's brother
- Mushtaq Khan
- Amita Nangia
- Haidar Ali as a film director
- Kishore Bhanushali
- Simi Garewal
- Anil Kapoor as himself (special appearance)
- Sanjay Dutt as himself (special appearance)

== Soundtrack ==
Short Kut

Soundtrack album by Shankar–Ehsaan–Loy
- Released: 17 June 2009
- Genre: Feature film soundtrack
- Label: T-Series

Shankar–Ehsaan–Loy chronology
Luck by Chance (2009)	Short Kut (2009)	13B (2009)

The film's soundtrack was composed by Shankar–Ehsaan–Loy, with lyrics written by Javed Akhtar. The song, "Patli Galli" was split into two versions in the film, even though only one version was included in the soundtrack.

The soundtrack contains four original songs and three remixes.

Track listing
No.	Title	Artist(s)	Length
1.	"Patli Galli"	Shankar Mahadevan	3:31
2.	"Kyun Hota Hai Dil Deewana"	Shreya Ghoshal, Javed Ali	3:35
3.	"Mareeze Mohabbat"	Nikita Nigam, Keerthi Sagathia, Hrishikesh Kamerkar, Shankar Mahadevan	3:59
4.	"Kal Nau Baje"	Alka Yagnik, Sonu Nigam	4:13
5.	"Patli Galli" (Remix)	Shankar Mahadevan, DJ Nasha, Nucleya	4:14
6.	"Mareeze Mohabbat" (Remix)	Nikita Nigam, Keerthi Sagathia, Hrishikesh Kamerkar, Shankar Mahadevan, DJ Nasha	3:54

== Reception ==
Taran Adarsh of Bollywood Hungama gave the film one out of five, writing, "On the whole, SHORT KUT - THE CON IS ON is a poor show all the way. A major disappointment." Shubhra Gupta of The Indian Express wrote, "Shortkut suffers from director Neeraj Vora's customary inability to infuse any newness or subtlety into a plot that could easily have gone the other way. It covers roughly the same ground as Zoya Akhtar's Luck By Chance, minus its craft and skill. Everything is loud and plastic, and the actors all chant their lines at the top of their voices." Gaurav Malani of The Economic Times gave the film 1 out of 5, writing, "The derived screenplay is patchy and its shows as writer Neeraj Vora struggles to script weak characters and weaker conflicts."
