= Luck by Chance (soundtrack) =

Film soundtrack album

Soundtrack album by Shankar–Ehsaan–Loy
- Released: 30 December 2008
- Genre: Feature film soundtrack
- Length: 34:31
- Labels: Big Music; T-Series
- Producer: Shankar–Ehsaan–Loy

Shankar–Ehsaan–Loy chronology
Chandni Chowk to China (2008)	Luck by Chance (2008)	Short Kut (2009)

Luck by Chance is the soundtrack album to the 2009 film, Luck by Chance directed by Zoya Akhtar, starring Farhan Akhtar, Hrithik Roshan and Konkona Sen Sharma. The music and score is composed by Shankar–Ehsaan–Loy, while the lyrics are penned by Javed Akhtar.

== Development ==
The track Sapno Se Bhare Naina based on the raag Bhairavi, where Shankar sang it in a thumri style backed up by drums and bass. The song was composed in about twenty minutes. Baawre is an upbeat Rajasthani folk song fusion where the trio have used traditional manganyar Rajasthani singers. Pyaar Ki Dastaan is an intentionally typical Bollywood romantic song picturized on Farhan and Isha while they are shooting for the movie within Luck By Chance. MIDIval Punditz did the remix of the tracks of the album, which were featured as background score in the movie. Against expectations, Farhan Akhtar did not lend his voice to the soundtrack, as he did in Rock On!!.

== Promos ==
The first music video for the film was Baawre. It released on 12 January 2009 and depicted a circus setting in which Hrithik Roshan and Isha Sharvani perform alongside Russian circus acts. Following "Baawre" was the video for the song "Sapnon Se Bhare Naina", showing Farhan and Konkona facing their trials and tribulations in the film industry. "Yeh Zindagi Bhi" was the last video released.

== Music release ==
The music of Luck By Chance was released on 30 December 2008. It had an early release through iTunes on 23 December 2008. The promotion of the music was done keeping the digital platform in mind. The music of Luck By Chance was made available directly and through partner sponsors on mobile, Internet and physical markets.

== Track listing ==
Track	Song	Singer(s)	Duration	Notes
1	Yeh Zindagi Bhi	Loy Mendonsa, Shekhar Ravjiani	6:39	Opening Credits of the Film
2	Baawre	Shankar Mahadevan, Mame Khan & Shantanu Moitra	5:13	Picturised on Hrithik Roshan, Farhan Akhtar, Isha Sharvani and Konkona Sen Sharma
3	Pyaar Ki Dastaan	Amit Paul, Mahalakshmi Iyer	5:21	Picturised on Isha Sharvani & Farhan Akhtar
4	Yeh Aaj Kya Ho Gaya	Sunidhi Chauhan	3:25	Picturised on Konkona Sen Sharma
5	Sapnon Se Bhare Naina	Shankar Mahadevan	4:59	Picturised on Farhan Akhtar
6	O Rahi Re	Shankar Mahadevan	4:27	Ending Credits of the Film with Konkona Sen Sharma
7	Baawre (Remix)	Loy Mendonsa, Shankar Mahadevan & Udit Narayan	4:27	Promotional Song

== Reception ==
Professional ratings
Review scores
Source	Rating
Bollywood Hungama	3.5/5 stars
Rediff.com	3.5/5 stars
MSN India	4/5 stars
Hindustan Times	3.5/5 stars
ITunes	5/5 stars

The music for the film received extremely positive reviews from critics. MSN India said, "The album has a robust mix of songs of different genres, a trademark of Shankar-Ehsaan-Loy that will enthrall audiences and at the same time give them sensible renditions to hum. On the whole, Luck By Chance stands for quality like most of the albums by Shankar-Ehsaan-Loy. A perfect soundtrack with medium-paced songs, great singing and hummable lyrics, the album is a sure shot hit. Shankar-Ehsaan-Loy, reinforces one's faith in good music. The composers also prove that Bollywood musicians aren't shy of experimenting." Rediff said, "The bottom line is that Luck By Chance's music is aimed at the Dil Chahta Hai generation of Bollywood viewers — it's definitely urban and the music rocks!" Hindustan Times wrote, "Shankar-Ehsaan-Loy come out of their comfort zone of lilting romantic melodies and wallop out unusual tracks here. Check out Shankar Mahadevan's masterful jugalbandi with a Rajasthani ensemble in "Baawre" or the dark, fast-paced "Sapnon se bhare naina", which are reason enough to buy the soundtrack". NDTV reviewed the soundtrack and said, "On the whole, Luck By Chance stands for quality like most of the albums by Shankar-Ehsaan-Loy. A perfect soundtrack with medium-paced songs, great singing and hummable lyrics, the album is a sure shot hit".
