= Prajakta Shukre =

Indian singer (born 1987)

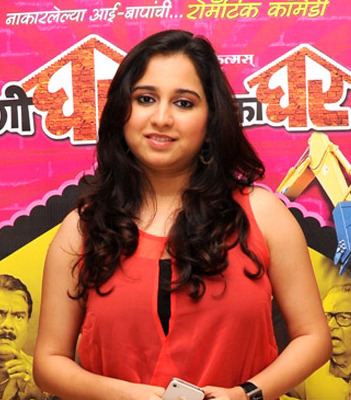
- Prajakta Shukre in 2013

Background information
- Born: Prajakta Shukre; 29 November 1987 (age 38); Jabalpur, Madhya Pradesh, India
- Genre: Filmi
- Occupations: Entertainer, singer, Indian Idol finalist, Jo Jeeta Wohi Super Star
- Instrument: Vocals
- Years active: 2005

Prajakta Shukre (born 29 November 1987) is an Indian singer who works in Bollywood films and has appeared on reality shows, notably Indian Idol (Season 1) finalist and Jo Jeeta Wohi Super Star.

== Career ==
From the age of four, she started participating in singing competitions. While she was in 12th standard, she decided to participate on season 1 of the singing-based reality television show Indian Idol. She rose to prominence after becoming the only female contestant to reach top five in her season. She finished fourth in her season.

After the show ended, she received various offers to sing professionally. She was signed by the Sony BMG label, and with composer Leslee Lewis, she released her debut solo album. She has performed on various stage shows with the winner of Indian Idol season 1, Abhijeet Sawant. In 2026, she was a contestant in Bigg Boss Marathi season 6.

== Television ==
- Indian Idol (season 1) (2005)
- Bigg Boss Marathi (2026)

== Discography ==
- Dhakka (2007) – Ithun Dhakka, Kuch To Kaho, Rangeela Re, Chori se, Gajab Hua, Kya Haal Hain, Neend Churayi Meri
- Hey Ganapati (2005)
- Shaadi No. 1 (2005) – Hello Madam
- Jaan-E-Mann (2006) – Kabul Kar Le
- Kehna Hai Aaj (2009)
- Tees Maar Khan (2010) – Happy Ending
- Jana Gana Bhaj Mana (2011)
- Apni Azadi Ko Hum (2012)
- Lagi Sai Lagan (2013)
- Jigariyaa (2014) – Mora Rangddar Saiyyaan
- Man Kyu Behka (The Unwind Mix) (2014)
- Jaane Kya Baat Hai (The Unwind Mix) (2014)
- Pucho Na Yaar Kya Hua (The Unwind Mix) (2015)
- Jai Ganesh Deva Aarti (2015)
- Aarti Kije Shri Raghuvarji Ki (Ram Aarti) (2015)
- Bhor Bhayi Din Chadh Gaya (2015)
- Om Jai Jagdish Hare Aarti (2015)
- Fusion Shiva – Om Jai Shiv Omkara (2016)
- Ye Zameen Ga Rahi Hai I (The Unwind Mix) (2016)
- Ka Karoon Sajni I (The Classical Unwind Mix) (2016)
- Kya Yahi Pyaar Hai (Bollywood Retro Lounge) (2016)
- FU: Friendship Unlimited (2017) – Uff Tuza Ha Jalwa
- Tu Rutha To (Bollywood Retro Love) (2017)
- Premam Jayati (2018)
- Tum Saath Ho Jab Apne (The Unwind Mix) (2018)
- Agar Tum Na Hote (Unwind Version) (2018)
- Chingariyan Yeh Dheemi Si (2018)
- Manikarnika: The Queen of Jhansi (2019) – Dankila song
- Thalaivii (2021) - Teri Aankhon Mein
- Vedaa (2024) - Mummy Ji
- Nishanchi (2025) - Jhule Jhule Paalna and Soja

== Controversy ==
In 2010, Prajakta Shukre with Abhijeet Sawant (with three other aspiring singers) were driving their individual cars in Santacruz, Mumbai, returning from a singers' meet. Shukre's car rammed into a scooter injuring two people. As public gathered, Sawant came out to help his friend. But an angry mob beat him. Later, police arrived rescuing them from mob.
