= Lottery (2009 film) =

- Movie poster
- Directed by: Hemant Prabhu
- Written by: Aadesh K. Arjun
- Screenplay by: Hemant Prabhu
- Produced by: Govind Satnam
- Starring: Abhijeet Sawant; Rucha Gujarati; Manisha Kelkar; Nassar Abdulla; Mukesh Tiwari
- Cinematography: Prakash Kutty
- Music by: Songs: Santosh Singh & Sanjay Pathak; Background Score: Surinder Sodhi
- Distributed by: Tips Music Films
- Release date: March 20, 2009 (India)
- Country: India
- Language: Hindi

Lottery is a 2009 Indian Hindi-language romantic thriller film starring Abhijeet Sawant in his acting debut alongside Manisha Kelkar and Rucha Gujarati. The film was produced by Govind Satnam, directed by Hemant Prabhu and written by Aadesh K. Arjun. It was released on March 20, 2009 and emerged as a box-office bomb.

== Plot ==
The film revolves around a love triangle. A man is attracted to two women and wins a lottery. To win again, he must consider killing one of the two women.

== Cast ==
- Abhijeet Sawant as Rohit Awasthi
- Gufi Paintal as Rustamji Batliwala
- Jaywant Wadkar
- Manisha Kelkar as Simran Kapoor
- Manasi Deshmukh as Nurse Monica
- Mukesh Tiwari as Raja Thakur
- Nassar Abdulla as Rohit's Boss
- Nitin Kadam
- Rana Jung Bahadur as Sharma
- Rucha Gujarati as Soha
- Sanjay Narvekar
- Sharmila Goenka as an item number

== Soundtrack ==
No.	Title	Singer(s)	Length
1.	"Dhadkanein Kehti Hai"	Abhijeet Sawant
2.	"Kamariya"	Sunidhi Chauhan, Santosh Singh
3.	"Kab Chand Ban Kar"	Abhijeet Sawant
4.	"Lottery"	Sukhwinder Singh
5.	"Kab Socha Tha"	Abhijeet Sawant
6.	"Kab Chand Ban Kar" (Female version)	Sunidhi Chauhan
7.	"Pata Hi Na Chala" (Sad)	Abhijeet Sawant, Santosh Singh
8.	"Dhadkanein Kehti Hai" (Remix)	Abhijeet Sawant
9.	"Lottery" (Remix)	Sukhwinder Singh

== Reception ==
Taran Adarsh from Bollywood Hungama gave the film one star out of five, criticizing it for pretending to be a thriller, a love triangle next, a whodunit later, a musical in between and ending up as something else altogether.
