= Tulika Ganguly =

Indian singer (born 1989)

- Born: Tulika Ganguly; 25 August 1989 (age 36); Faridabad, Haryana, India
- Origin: India
- Genres: Filmi
- Occupations: Entertainer, singer
- Instrument: Vocals
- Years active: 2008–present
- Website: www.iamtulika.com

Tulika Ganguly (born 25 August 1989) is an Indian singer who works in Bollywood films, as well as reality shows.

== Career ==
She was doing her graduation in political Science from Gargi College of Delhi University, New Delhi, when she decided to participate in Indian Idol Season 4. Tulika is a classically trained singer who is now doing live shows and concerts worldwide. Tulika was the former face of the Bollywood channel UTV Stars, for which she anchored several shows.
