= Vaishnav Girish =

Singer

- Born: Kodungallur, India
- Genres: Indian Classical Music, Pop
- Occupation: Playback Singer
- Instrument: Vocals
- Years active: 2014 – present

Vaishnav Girish is an Indian singer. He has appeared in several singing reality TV shows and has recorded songs for films in Malayalam language. Vaishnav rose to fame when his audition for the 2017 season of Zee TV's musical talent hunt show Sa Re Ga Ma Pa Li'l Champs 2017 became a viral video online, and led to a nationwide press coverage.

== Personal life ==
He developed interest in music, listening to his brother Krishnanunni Girish learn Indian classical music. A former vocalist of the Thrissur-based alternative rock band 1000cc, Krishnanunni inspired him to take up singing as a career. At the age of four, he started formal training in Carnatic music from Pavithran Kodungallur and continued further training for school competitions and reality television shows under Noushad Kodungallur and Cherthala Shaji.

Vaishnav attended Holy Grace Academy, Mala and St. Joseph's Higher Secondary School, Mathilakam. During his time at Holy Grace Academy, he was awarded the Kalaprathibha title at the CBSE State Kalotsav for two consecutive years (2013 and 2014). He also secured grade A for Light Music, Ghazal and Urdu group song events at 58th Kerala School Kalolsavam held in 2017.

== Career ==
Vaishnav competed in Surya TV's Surya Singer 2, a Malayalam music reality show in 2014, where he emerged the winner. In 2015, his participation in the second edition of Indian reality television singing competition Indian Idol Junior, earned him recognition. Universal Music India (UMI) signed a two-year record deal with him before he finished the competition as the third runner-up.

After Vaishnav's audition for the sixth season of Sa Re Ga Ma Pa Li'l Champs 2017, singing "Bin Tere" (from the Hindi film, I Hate Luv Storys), went viral online in July 2017, he was featured in Indian Express, Times of India, Mathrubhumi among others, bringing him wider fame in India.

In 2018, Vaishnav made his debut as a playback singer with the Malayalam film, "Ankarajyathe Jimmanmar", composed by Girish Nayanan.

== Discography ==
Year	Film	Song	Composer	Lyricist	Ref
2018	Ankarajyathe Jimmanmar	Mattulad Mattulad	Girish Nayanan	O.S Unnikrishnan	
2018	Kidu	Parannu Parannu	T.K Vimal	Nishad Ahmed	
2018	Angane Njanum Premichu	Paattonnu Paadalo	Hesham Abdul Wahab	B.K Harinarayanan	
2019	Varikkuzhiyile Kolapathakam	Kalakaanji	Mejo Joseph	Joffy Tharakan	
2023	Jaladhara Pumpset Since 1962	Kuruvi	Kailas Menon	Manu Manjith	
