= Love Me India =

Live Indian Singing reality show

- Official promotional poster
- Genre: Live Singing reality show
- Created by: Essel Vision Productions
- Developed by: Essel Vision Productions
- Presented by: Meiyang Chang
- Judges: Himesh Reshammiya; Neha Bhasin; Guru Randhawa
- Theme music composer: Himesh Reshammiya
- Opening theme: Love Me India
- Ending theme: Love Me India
- Country of origin: India
- Original language: Hindi
- No. of seasons: 1
- No. of episodes: 535

Production
- Producer: Essel Vision Productions
- Camera setup: Multi-Camera
- Running time: 90 Minutes approx

Original release
- Network: ZEE5 & TV
- Release: 18 September 2023 – 30 June 2024

Love Me India is a live singing reality show that broadcasts on & TV. It is the first live singing reality show for kids in India, between the ages of 5 and 15. The show was hosted by Meiyang Chang and cameo hosted by Sunanda Wong (for audition period only).

== Captains ==
Judged by Guru Randhawa, Himesh Reshammiya and Neha Bhasin. There are four more judges in the show (called 'captains' in the show). It introduced captains across the four zones — Anusha Mani (South), Bhoomi Trivedi (East), Navraj Hans (North) and Abhijeet Sawant (West).

== Top 6 Finalists ==
- **Denotes Winner in bold**
Harshita Bhattacharya from East Zone

Mohammad Faiz from West Zone Guru Kiran Hegde & Antara Kulkarni (Winner) from South Zone Anurag Verma from North Zone Stuti Jaiswal from East Zone.

== Contestant ==
- **Donates Winner in bold**

**Captain**	**Name**	**Zone**
Navraj Hans	Shaurya Amit	North Zone
Navraj Hans	Kabir Bharadwaj	North Zone
Navraj Hans	Anusha Joshi	North Zone
Navraj Hans	Komal Rana	North Zone
Navraj Hans	Atharva Chaturvedi	North Zone
Navraj Hans	Gulshan Kumar	North Zone
Navraj Hans	Anurag Verma √	North Zone
Navraj Hans	Jashanpreet Singh	North Zone
Navraj Hans	Stenzin Edzes	North Zone
Navraj Hans	Bunty Bhandal	North Zone
Navraj Hans	Pawan Rai	North Zone
Navraj Hans	Harnoor Kaur	North Zone
Anusha Mani	Sonal Srivastava	South Zone
Anusha Mani	Aditi Nair	South Zone
Anusha Mani	D Sri Dhruthi	South Zone
Anusha Mani	Sharanya S	South Zone
Anusha Mani	Antara Kulkarni √	South Zone
Anusha Mani	Shreya Sriranga	South Zone
Anusha Mani	Jyothi Sharma	South Zone
Anusha Mani	Nidhi Shenoy	South Zone
Anusha Mani	Guru Kiran Hegde √	South Zone
Anusha Mani	Lalasa Rachapudi	South Zone
Anusha Mani	Veldi Srikruthi	South Zone
Anusha Mani	Sai Veda Vagdevi	South Zone
Bhoomi Trivedi	Swarnali Acharya	East Zone
Bhoomi Trivedi	Tanishka Sarkar	East Zone
Bhoomi Trivedi	Harshita Bhattacharya √	East Zone
Bhoomi Trivedi	Nissan Mishra	East Zone
Bhoomi Trivedi	Bidipta Chakraborty	East Zone
Bhoomi Trivedi	Antara Sarkar	East Zone
Bhoomi Trivedi	Priyanshu Samantaray	East Zone
Bhoomi Trivedi	Subhransu Kumar Bisoi	East Zone
Bhoomi Trivedi	Stuti Jaiswal √	East Zone
Bhoomi Trivedi	Nilofar Naaz	East Zone
Bhoomi Trivedi	Dipshikha Bhuyan	East Zone
Bhoomi Trivedi	Bhargavi Goswami	East Zone
Abhijeet Sawant	Prerana Sarma, Sagarika S	West Zone
Abhijeet Sawant	Priyansh Nigam	West Zone
Abhijeet Sawant	Mohammad Faiz √	West Zone
Abhijeet Sawant	Tusha Banku	West Zone
Abhijeet Sawant	Shivam Singh	West Zone
Abhijeet Sawant	Deyashini Roy	West Zone
Abhijeet Sawant	Utkarsh Wankhede	West Zone
Abhijeet Sawant	Pickosa Moharkar	West Zone
Abhijeet Sawant	Vaishnavi Bhalerao	West Zone
Abhijeet Sawant	Samyak Kiravekar	West Zone
Abhijeet Sawant	Anuja Joshi	West Zone

== Live voting ==
Audience can vote for any contestant through ZEE5.
