= Sandeep Acharya =

Indian singer

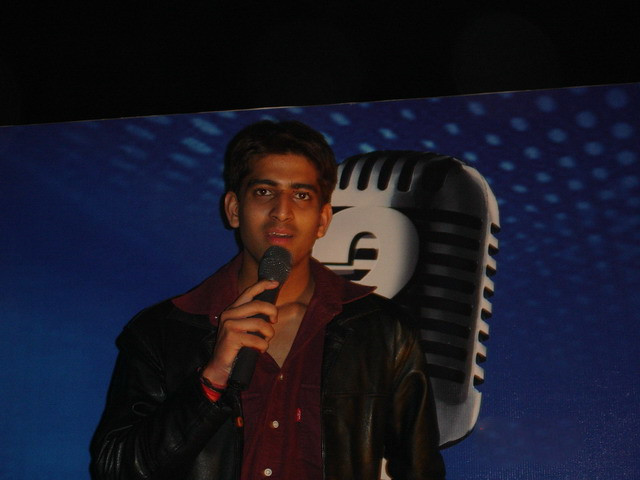
- Sandeep Acharya at a stage show in Ahmedabad

Background information
- Born: 4 February 1984; Bikaner, Rajasthan, India
- Died: 15 December 2013 (aged 29) Gurgaon, Haryana, India
- Occupation: Singer
- Label: Sony BMG

Sandeep Acharya (4 February 1984 – 15 December 2013) was an Indian singer who won the second season of the reality television show Indian Idol in 2006. He was from Bikaner, Rajasthan, he died on 15 December 2013 Gurgaon's Medanta Hospital.

== Awards ==
Acharya's awards include:

1. Runner-up in the Golden Voice of India.
2. Indian Idol Season 2 (2006):
3. Bollywood Music Awards (November 2006):

== Death ==
Acharya died on 15 December 2013 following a bout with jaundice, following his admission to Medanta Hospital in Gurgaon.

== Discography ==
- "Mere Sath Sara Jahan"
- Do Dilon Ke Khel Mein
- O Sanam Tere Bina
