= Telugu Indian Idol =

Indian version of the Pop Idol format

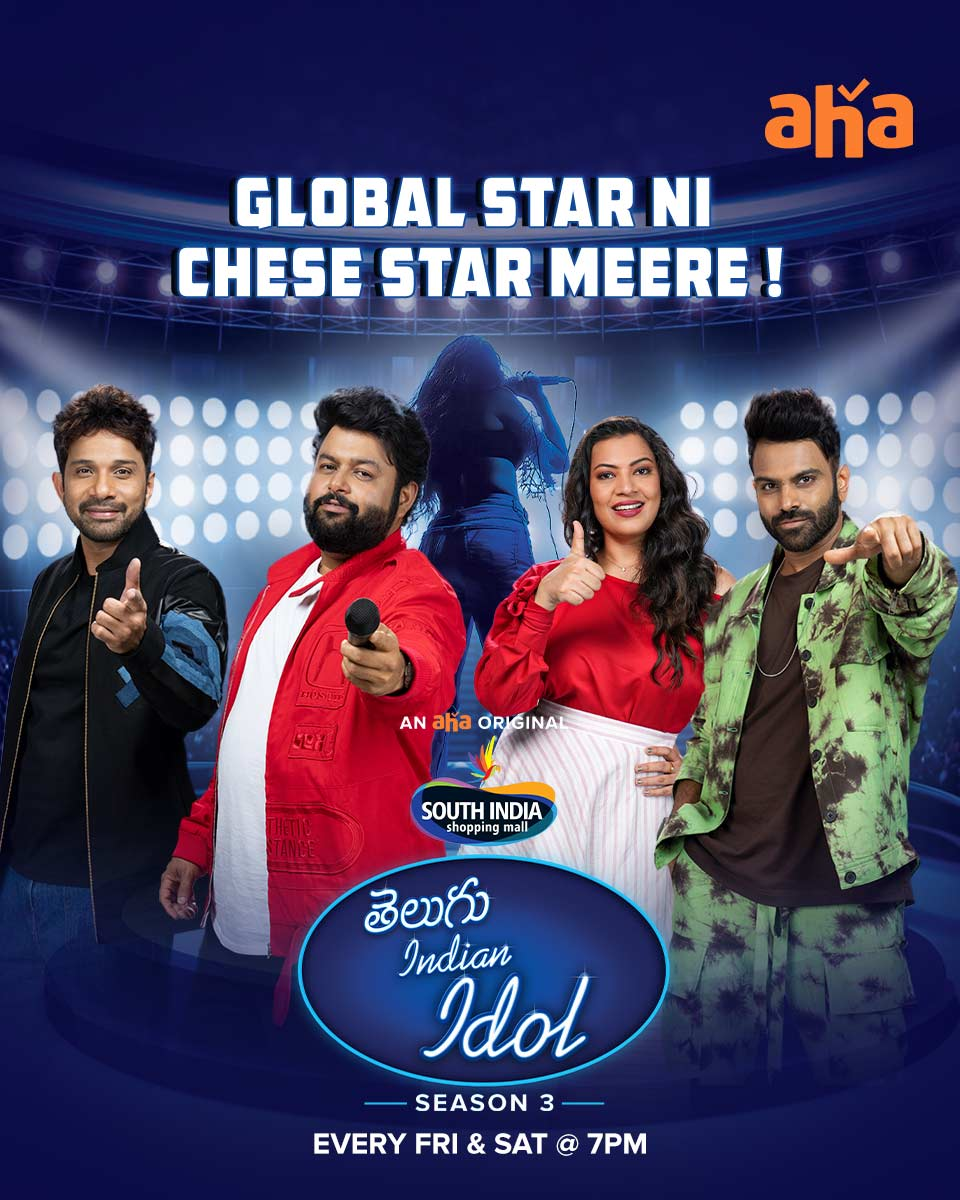
- Genre: Reality television
- Created by: Simon Fuller
- Based on: Simon Fuller
- Directed by: Advait Shelke, Ujjwal Anand
- Presented by: Sreerama Chandra (Season 1, 3-); Hemachandra (Season 2)
- Judges: Thaman S (Season 1–present); Karthik (Season 1–present); Geetha Madhuri (Season 2–present); Nithya Menen (Season 1)
- Theme music composer: Julian Gingell; Barry Stone; Cathy Dennis
- Country of origin: India
- Original language: Telugu
- No. of seasons: 4
- No. of episodes: 90

Production
- Camera setup: Multi-camera
- Production company: Fremantle

Original release
- Network: Aha
- Release: 25 February 2022 – present

Telugu Indian Idol is an Indian Telugu-language music competition television series and is part of Indian Idol. It is Telugu version of the Pop Idol format. First season of the show was premiered on 25 February 2022 on Aha. Vagdevi was announced as the winner of the first season. Third season was premiered on 14 June 2024.

== Season 1 ==
=== Production ===
The finale episode of the season was initially scheduled to be shot on 6 June 2022, but was postponed to 7 June 2022.

=== Judges and presenters ===
Sreerama Chandra was signed as the presenter of the first season after becoming the runner-up of the reality show Bigg Boss 5. While, the judges of the first season are Nithya Menen, Karthik and Thaman S. After Karthik was announced as one of the judges, the show faced criticism. Several netizens argued that he is accused of MeToo and slammed the production for choosing him.

=== Contestants ===
Standing	Name	Hometown	Result
1st	Kumara Vagdevi	Nellore	Winner
2nd	Srinivas Darimisetty	Kadapa	1st Runner-up
3rd	Vaishnavi Kovvuri	Chennai	2nd Runner-up
	K Pranathi	Hyderabad	Finalist
	Boda Jayanth Maadhur	Ramagundam	Finalist
	Lalasa Rachapudi	Hyderabad	Semi-Finalist
	Sake Renu Kumar	Tirupati	Eliminated 6th
	Aditi Bhavaraju	Hyderabad	Eliminated 5th
	Maruthi Kodimoju	Rajanna Sircilla	Eliminated 4th
	A. Manya Chandran	Tirupati	Eliminated 3rd
	Chitta Lakshmi Sravani	Kothagudem	Eliminated 2nd
	Jaskiran Singh	Punjab	Eliminated 1st

== Season 2 ==
=== Judges and presenters ===
Hemachandra was signed as the presenter of the season. Thaman S and Karthik returned as the guests for the third time, while Nithya Menen was replaced by Geetha Madhuri as the judge.

=== Contestants ===
Standing	Name	Hometown	Result
1st	Soujanya Bhagavatula	Visakhapatnam	Winner
2nd	Jayaram	Hyderabad	1st Runner Up
3rd	Lasya Priya	Siddipet	2nd Runner-up
	Sruthi Nanduri	New Jersey	Finalist
	Karthikeya	Hyderabad	Finalist
	Pranathi	Visakhapatnam	Semi-Finalist
	Chakrapani	Palasa	Eliminated 7th
	Hitesh Sai (wildcard)	Vizag	Eliminated 6th
	Saketh	Hyderabad	Eliminated 5th
	Aditya	Hyderabad	Eliminated 4th
	Sai Vaishnavi	Vijayawada	Eliminated 3rd
	Manasa	Hyderabad	Eliminated 2nd
	Yuti Harshavardhana	Bengaluru	Eliminated 1st

=== Celebrity guests ===
Episode No	Guest Name
5 - 7	Nandamuri Balakrishna
8 - 9	Koti
10 - 11	Baba Sehgal
12 - 13	S. P. Charan
13	Nani
14 - 15	Chandrabose
16 - 17	B. V. Nandini Reddy, Santosh Sobhan, Malvika Nair
20 - 21	Smita
22 - 23	K.S Chithra
24 - 25	Devi Sri Prasad
28 - 29	Allu Arjun

== Season 3 ==
According to reports, for season 3 there were 150,000 auditions were conducted to shortlist 12 contestants, Third season was premiered on 14 June 2024, with two episodes being released every week.

=== Judges and presenters ===
Sreerama Chandra returned as the presenter of the season for the second time, after the first season. Thaman S, Karthik and Geetha Madhuri returned as the judges of the season.

=== Contestants ===
Standing	Name	Hometown	Status
1st	Nazeeruddin	Tadepalligudem	Winner
2nd	Anirudh Suswaram	Kurnool	1st Runner Up
3rd	Sri Keerthi	Vizag	2nd Runner-up
	Keerthana	Kakinada	Finalist
	Skanda Veluvali	Hyderabad	Finalist
	Bharat Raj	Nizamabad	Semi Finalist
	Keshav Ram	Melbourne	Eliminated 7th
	Sai Vallabha	Nandyal	Eliminated 6th
	Abhigna (Wildcard Entry)	Virginia	Eliminated 5th
	Sri Dhruthi	Hyderabad	Eliminated 4th
	Rajani Sree Poornimaa	Hyderabad	Eliminated 3rd
	Hari Priya	Hyderabad	Eliminated 2nd
	Kushal Sharma	Jagtial	Eliminated 1st

=== Celebrity guests ===
Episode No	Guest Name
5–6	Vijay Deverakonda
11–12	Vijay Yesudas
12	Ankith Koyya, Narne Nithin,Ram Miriyala
15–16	Rashmika Mandanna
19–20	Nani
21–22	Naveen Polishetty

Thaman had promised to give talented singers from the season a chance, and he kept his word by letting Nazeer and Bharat Raj sing the track “Firestorm” from OG.

== Season 4 ==
Season 4 premiered on 29 August 2025, with the theme “Gully to Global – Manamera Idol”. The producers described the theme as a celebration of grassroots musical talent rising to international recognition. The season continued the show’s mission of discovering musical talent from across Telugu-speaking regions and abroad. Auditions were held on August 3rd in Kukatpally, Hyderabad. The event took place near the JNTU Metro station and was promoted by the official aha.

=== Judges and Presenters ===
Singer and actor Sreerama Chandra returned as the main host for his third time, joined by Sameera Bharadwaj as the new co-host.

The judging panel remained consistent with the previous season, featuring S. S. Thaman, Geetha Madhuri, and Karthik.

=== Contestants ===
Below is the list of contestants for Season 4 (Top 12)

Standing	Name	Hometown
Brinda	Hyderabad	Winner
Pavan Kalyan	Hyderabad	1st Runner Up
D. Dheeraj	Vizag	2nd Runner-up
Snigdha Eleswarapu	Dallas	Finalist
Sristi Chilla	Michigan & Warangal	Finalist
Kurma Sahasra	Hyderabad	Finalist
Darshan	Bangalore, Karnataka	Double Eliminated 5th & 6th
Sai Sashank	Hyderabad	Double Eliminated 5th & 6th
Shwetha Somasundaram	Kerala	Eliminated 4th
Nihal Banda	Hyderabad	Double Eliminated 2nd & 3rd
Manojna	Los Angeles	Double Eliminated 2nd & 3rd
Hemant Madduri	Hyderabad	Eliminated 1st

=== Episodes ===
Episode No.	Title	Date	Description
1	Launch Episode – Part 1	29 August 2025	Grand launch, theme introduction, new co-host joins, auditions begin
2	Launch Episode – Part 2	30 August 2025	More audition glimpses, guest appearances by Sridevi & Nara Rohit
3	Gully to Global – Journey Begins Part 1	5 September 2025	Auditions, decision week to choose theatre round participants
4	Gully to Global – Journey Begins Part 2	6 September 2025	Final selection of Top 12 contestants
5	Grand Premiere with Genelia Part 1	12 September 2025	Genelia Deshmukh presents the Top 12 contestants
6	Grand Premiere with Genelia Part 2	13 September 2025	Continuation of the premiere celebrations
7	OG Idol Party Part 1	19 September 2025	Judges host “OG’s party”; guest of honor: Kanmani, Priyanka Mohan
8	OG Idol Party Part 2	20 September 2025	Party continues, elimination occurs
9	Panduga Special Part 1	26 September 2025	Festive special episode, featuring Telusu Kada team
10	Panduga Special Part 2	27 September 2025	Continuation of festive celebrations
11	Prema O Prema Part 1	3 October 2025	Romantic themed performances, love secrets from judges
12	Prema O Prema Part 2	4 October 2025	Double elimination, surprises, emotional performances
