= Sourabhee Debbarma =

Indian singer

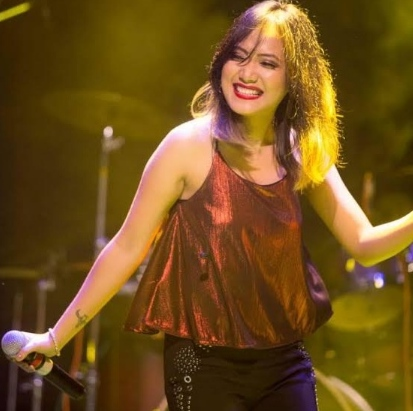
- Born: 18 October 1985 (age 40); Agartala, Tripura, India
- Occupations: Playback singer, actress, director
- Years active: 2009
- Known for: Indian idol
- Height: 162 cm (5 ft 4 in)
- Spouse: Kapil Thapa
- Awards: Indian idol best female award
- Musical career
- Genres: Playback singing
- Years active: 2009
- Website: www.sourabheedebbarma.com

Sourabhee Debbarma (born 1985) is an Indian singer who was a contestant on the Indian Idol 4, where she became the first female winner. She is also a Guinness World record holder. She is a singer, performer and entertainer who performed live concerts and has performed across India and abroad in countries like Hong Kong, Nigeria, Durban, New York City, London, Kuwait, Bangladesh and Nepal.

== Personal life ==
Sourabhee Debbarma was born in 1985 to a couple from Tripura. Even though Sourabhee's parents are government employees and disconnected from the world of music, they have been supportive of her decision and encouraged her. She had done her education in St Paul's School, Agartala.

=== Guinness World Record ===
Sourabhee Debbarma, the first female Indian Idol who hailed from Tripura breaks the Guinness World Record and made to the list of Guinness Book of World Record. In the telecast on 18 March on a private TV channel, the former "Indian Idol" winner Sourabhee Debbarma attempted to sing a song hanging upside down. She took the challenge to break the existing record of New Zealand's Rebecca Wright, who sang upside down for 3 Min 53 seconds. She sang for 4 minutes and 30 seconds. Sourabhee has always been extremely interested in Music and was found performing in all college events when she was a student of ASMs College of Commerce Science and Information Technology CSIT.
