= Devender Pal Singh =

Indian playback singer

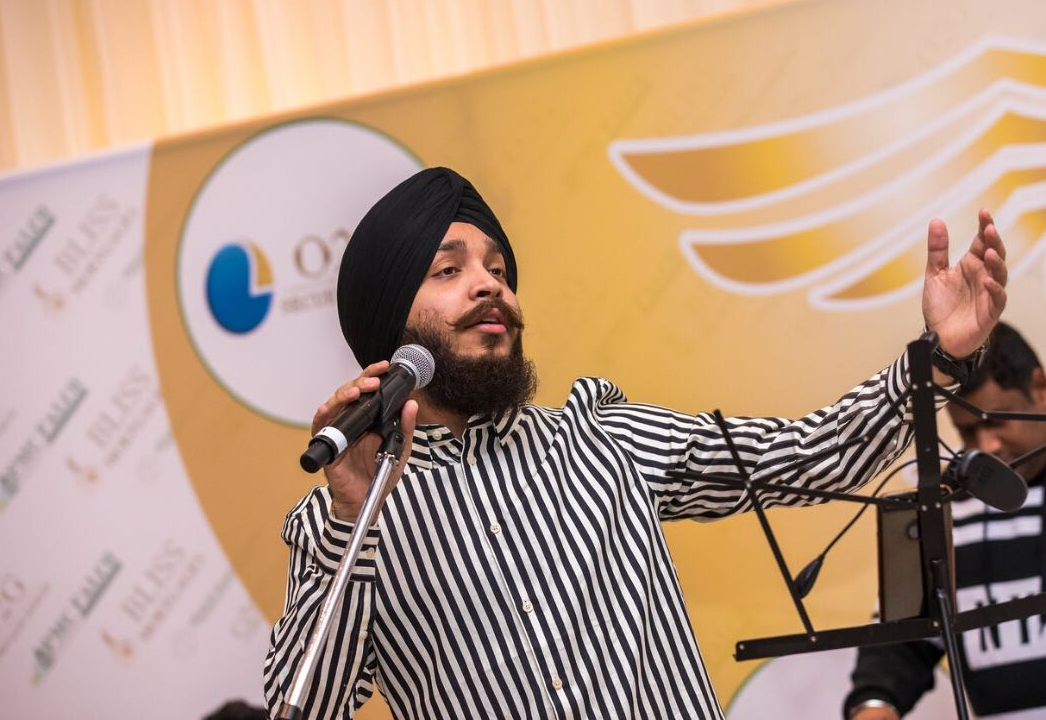
- Born: Ludhiana, Punjab, India
- Occupation: Singer
- Known for: Sufi and Classical Singing Style

Devender Pal Singh is an Indian playback singer who made his debut in the 2012 film Luv Shuv Tey Chicken Khurana. He first gained recognition as a singer as a top 5 finalist on series 6 of Indian Idol.

== Discography ==
=== Playback singing ===
Year	Film	Song	Composer	Language	Co-singer
2021	Haseen Dillruba	"Lakeeran"	Amit Trivedi	Hindi	Asees Kaur
2020	Jai Mummy Di	"Jai Mummy Di"	Parag Chhabra	Hindi	Nikhita Gandhi, Vivek Hariharan, Parag Chhabra
2019	Ardaas Karaan	"Satgur Pyare" "Bandeya"	Jatinder Shah	Punjabi	Sunidhi Chauhan
2018	Manmarziyaan	"Bijlee Giregi"	Amit Trivedi	Hindi	Babu Haabi
2017	Firangi	"Gulbadan"	Jatinder Shah	Hindi	Mamta Sharma
2012	Luv Shuv Tey Chicken Khurana	"Luni Hasi"	Amit Trivedi	Hindi	Harshdeep Kaur
