= Amit Sana =

Indian singer (born 1983)

- Born: Amit kumar Sana; 1 March 1983 (age 43); Bhilai, Chhattisgarh, India
- Genres: Filmi; Indian pop; Indian classical music
- Occupation: Playback singer
- Instrument: Vocals
- Years active: 2005–present

Amit Sana (born 1 March 1983) is an Indian pop artist, playback singer, live performer and the finalist of Indian Idol 1. He was also a part of the show Jo Jeeta Wohi Superstar. He sings predominantly in Hindi. Apart from this, he has also sung in Telugu, Punjabi, Bengali, and Assamese language films.

== Personal life ==
Amit Sana was born on 1 March 1983 to Shyamsundar Rao Sana and Rajeshwari Sana in Bhilai, Madhya Pradesh (now Chhattisgarh). He started singing at the age of 3, and by the time he was 8 years old, he began his classical training. His father spotted his talent for singing when he performed for Bhilai steel plant and later sent him to Late Shri R.R.Ghule for his initial classical training. He trained him till the age of 16. He later went for learning professional classical singing from his guru, Late Shri Bimalendu Mukherjee (vice chancellor, Indira Kala Sangeet Vishwavidyalaya Khairagarh) for 3 years. He was married to Miss Manisha Bansal in the year 2011 and got divorced in the year 2018.

== Career ==
Sana began his musical journey at the age of eight with his first stage performance at a function organised by the Bhilai Steel Plant. Over the following years, he participated in several local and state-level music competitions, gradually earning recognition within the regional music fraternity. His early achievements included a performance at the All India Kiran Sangeet Samaroh in Katni, where he secured third place, and representing Chhattisgarh in the National Youth Festival in the Indian classical music category. After completing his schooling, he moved to Jamshedpur (Jharkhand) to pursue a bachelor’s degree in Information Technology. During this period, he auditioned for the Channel V talent show Pop Stars in 2002 alongside his brother, but was not selected. In 2004, he auditioned in Kolkata for the inaugural season of Indian Idol, where he eventually emerged as the runner-up for the season.

Post Indian Idol, he released his first album "Chal Diye" composed by Vishal–Shekhar with Sony Music in 2005. followed by "Yaadein" which was composed by Rajiv Bhatt through Times Music in 2008. In the same year,he participated in Jo Jeeta Wohi Super Star on Star Plus as a celebrity singer but was eliminated after a few performances.

== Reality show ==
Name	Channel	Status
Indian Idol	Sony TV	Runner Up
Jo Jeeta Wohi Super Star	Star plus	

== Discography ==
=== Movies ===
Song name	Movie name	Music director	Music label	Year
Thi Meri Dastan	kalyug	Anu Malik	Saregama India	2005
Kubool Kar Le	Jaan-E-Mann	Anu Malik	T-Series	2006
Kabhi Aana Na	Delhii Heights	Rabbi Shergill	Saregama India	2007
Sun Zara Dil Ki Sun Zara	Sun Zara	Sandesh Shandilya	DRJ Records	2006
Unse Nazre Mili	Sun Zara	Sandesh Shandilya	DRJ Records	2006
Wo Rat Me Boli	Sun Zara	Sandesh Shandilya	DRJ Records	2006

=== Music video and albums ===
Song name	Album name	Year	Music label
Yaad Aayenge yeh pal	Pal	2004	
Chal Diye	Chal Diye	2005	Sony Music
Mohobattein Lutaunga	Chal Diye	2005	Sony Music
Who Kisna Hai	Chal Diye	2005	Sony Music
Naadan They	Maahi Vey	2012	Saga Hits
Yaadein	Yaadein	2013	Times Music
Woh ho Tum	Yaadein	2013	Times Music
Khalish	Yaadein	2013	Times Music
Aaja Meri Jaan	Yaadein	2013	Times Music
Mere Khayalon Mein	Yaadein	2013	Times Music
Yaaron	Yaadein	2014	Sony Music
