= Abhijeet Sawant =

Indian singer (born 1981)

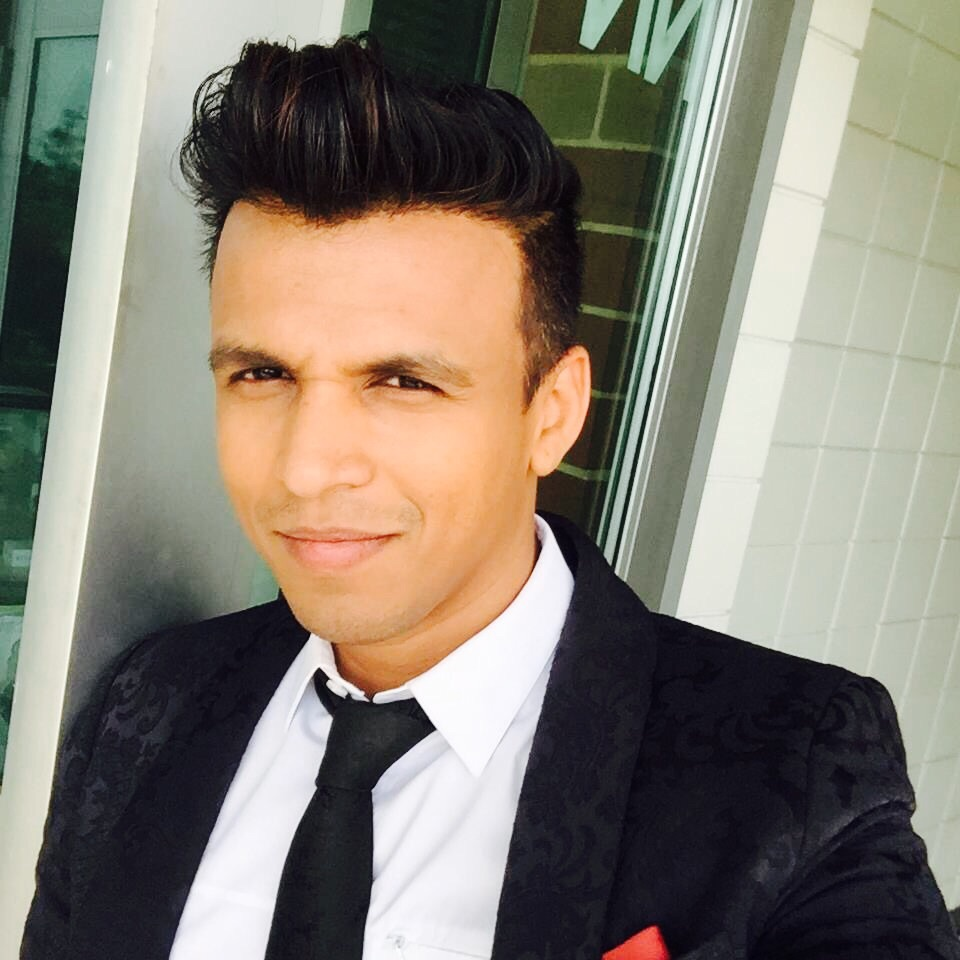
- Sawant in 2015
- Born: 7 October 1981 (age 45); Mumbai, Maharashtra, India
- Occupations: Singer, actor
- Years active: 2004–present
- Known for: Indian Idol 1; Bigg Boss Marathi 5; Nach Baliye
- Spouse: Shilpa Edvankar (m. 2007)
- Children: 2
- Musical career
- Genres: Indian pop, playback
- Instrument: Vocals
- Label: Abhijeet Sawant

Abhijeet Sawant (born 7 October 1981) is an Indian singer, television personality, and the winner of first season of Indian Idol. He was the first runner up of Jo Jeeta Wohi Super Star and finished third in Asian Idol. He was also the first runner up of Bigg Boss Marathi 5.

== Early life ==
Abhijeet Sawant the first Indian Idol was born on October 7, 1981 in a middle class Marathi speaking family, he studied in Mumbai’s Raje Shivaji Vidyalay in Mahim before completing his graduation from Chetna College, Bandra.

Abhijeet has revealed that he was not a good student academically, but developed interest in singing and it was his uncle, a professional artist who guided him in finding his career path.

While working on his music career, he studied sound engineering, and IT at University of Mumbai. After graduating from Chetana College of Commerce & Economics, Sawant joined the music industry.

== Career ==
=== Singing ===
Abhijeet Sawant won the 1st season of Indian Idol, an adaptation of the Pop Idol format, in 2004. His first solo album, Aapka Abhijeet Sawant, was released on 14 April 2005. That year he also did playback singing in the movie Aashiq Banaya Aapne, performing the song Mar Jaawan Mit Jaawan.

His second album, Junoon, was released on 10 July 2007. The title track charted in India.

Abhijeet Sawant was a finalist of Clinic All Clear Jo Jeeta Wohi Superstar on Star Plus in 2008. The show was a competition between the winners and runners-up of various singing reality shows on Indian television. Sawant became the first runner up of the show.

He released his third studio album in 2013 which was titled Farida.

=== Acting ===
Sawant made his acting debut in the movie Lottery in 2009. He also made a small appearance at the end of film Tees Maar Khan.

He made a special appearance as himself in the romantic drama series Kaisa Ye Pyar Hai and thriller crime series C.I.D.

=== Other ===
Sawant and his wife Shilpa participated in the dancing reality show Nach Baliye (Season 4) in (2008–2009). They were eliminated after facing public votes.

He co-hosted Indian Idol 5 along with Hussain Kuwajerwala.

He has joined the Shiv Sena with a mandate to attract youth to the party fold.

In 2024, he competed and finished as the runner-up of Bigg Boss Marathi Season 5.

In 2025, he competed on Celebrity MasterChef India where he was the second person to be eliminated.

== Controversy ==
In 2010, Sawant and his friend Prajakta Shukre (with three other aspiring singers) were driving their individual cars in Santa Cruz (Mumbai), returning from a singers' meet. Shukre's car rammed into a scooter injuring two people. As public gathered, Sawant came out to help his friend. But an angry mob beat him. Later, police arrived rescuing them from mob.

== Discography ==
Studio albums

| Title | Songs | Album details |
|---|---|---|
| Aapka... Abhijeet Sawant | Mohabbatein Lutaaunga; Lafzon Mein; Kya Tujhe Pata Hai; Jaana(with Prajakta Shukre); Janam Janam; Lamha (Summer Remix); Yaaron Chalo (Summer Remix); Dream Girl; Ek Jahan | Released: 14 April 2005; Label: Sony BMG Music India |
| Junoon | Junoon; Dhoondein; Ek Shaqs; Mahi Mahi Mahiya; Tere Bina; Tanha; Meri Aankhen; Tham Ja; Junoon (The Dance Mix by DJ Akbar Sami); Dhoondein (The Club Mix by Jatin Sharma) | Released: 18 December 2007; Label: Sony BMG Music India; Music directors: Amit Trivedi, Mithoon, Biddu, Jatin Sharma |
| Farida | Farida; Dil Fakira; Aao Morey Piya; Jhalleya; Bawari; Kuch Kar Maula; Firaak Main | Released: 2013; Label: Universal Music India |
| Fakira | | Released: 2018; Label: Universal Music India |

=== As playback singer ===
As singer
| Year | Song | Film | Composer | Co-singer(s) |
|---|---|---|---|---|
| 2005 | "Mar Jaavan Mit Jaavan" | Aashiq Banaya Aapne | Himesh Reshammiya | Sunidhi Chauhan |
| 2006 | "Yaad Teri Yaad" | Jawani Diwani - A Youthful Joyride | Sajid–Wajid | Shreya Ghoshal |
| 2009 | "Dhadkanein Kehti Hai" "Kab Chand Ban Kar" "Kab Socha Tha" "Pata Hi Na Chala" (Sad) "Dhadkanein Kehti Hai" (Remix) | Lottery | Santosh Singh & Sanjay Pathak | |
| 2010 | "Happy Ending" | Tees Maar Khan | Vishal–Shekhar | Harshit Saxena, Debojit Saha, Prajakta Shukre |
| 2012 | "Bechain Sapne" | Chittagong | Shankar–Ehsaan–Loy | |
| 2014 | "Sar Sukhachi Shravani" | Mangalashtak Once More | Nilesh Moharir | Bela Shende |
| 2014 | "Beating Beating" | Ishq Wala Love | S. J. Surya | Neha Rajpal, Kirti Killedar |
| 2015 | "Ye Na" | Baji | Atif Afzal | |
| 2016 | "Sau Tarah Ke Revisited" | Dishoom | Pritam | Aditi Singh Sharma |
| 2016 | "Ishqa" | Dishoom | Pritam | Antara Mitra |
| 2017 | "Hume Tumse Pyaar Kitna" | "Single" | Shomu Seal | None |
| 2017 | "Rangreza" | "Duet" | Sukumar Dutta | Pragya Patra |
| 2019 | "Tera Rishta" | “Single” | Shahzeb Tejani | Shahzeb Tejani |
| 2023 | "Tum Ho Nazmm Hamaarii" | Moods with Melodies | Himesh Reshammiya | None |
| 2026 | "Sakhe Ga Saajani (Title Track)" | Sakhe Ga Saajani | Vijay Bhate | Solo |
| 2026 | "Jaadu Kelis Tu" | Swapnasundari | Ankush Boradkar | Aarya Ambekar |

== Filmography ==
=== Films ===
| Year | Title | Role | Notes |
|---|---|---|---|
| 2009 | Lottery | Rohit Awasthi | |
| 2010 | Tees Maar Khan | Himself | Special appearance |

=== Television ===
| Year | Title | Role | Notes |
|---|---|---|---|
| 2004 - 2005 | Indian Idol | Contestant | Winner |
| 2005 | Kaisa Ye Pyar Hai | Himself | |
| 2005 | CID | Himself | |
| 2007 | Asian Idol | Contestant | Third Place |
| 2008 | Jo Jeeta Wohi Super Star | Contestant | Runner-up |
| 2008 - 2009 | Nach Baliye | Contestant | 13th Place |
| 2010 | Indian Idol 5 | Host | |
| 2011 | Comedy Circus | Contestant | |
| 2015 | Comedy Nights With Kapil | Himself | |
| 2018 | Love Me India | Mentor | |
| 2024 | Bigg Boss Marathi 5 | Contestant | 1st Runner-up |
| 2025 | Celebrity MasterChef India | Contestant | 11th Place |
