= Indian Idol Junior =

Indian reality television singing competition

- Hosted by: Karan Wahi; Mandira Bedi
- Judges: Vishal Dadlani; Shekhar Ravjiani; Shreya Ghoshal
- Winner: Anjana Padmanabhan
- Runners-up: Debanjana Karmakar; Anmol Jaswal; Nirvesh Dave

Release
- Original network: Sony TV
- Original release: 1 June 2013 – September 13, 2015

Indian Idol Junior is an Indian Hindi-language reality television singing competition and is a spin-off of Indian Idol. It began broadcasting on Sony Entertainment Television from 1 June 2013. Karan Wahi and Mandira Bedi hosted the show, which was judged by music duo Vishal–Shekhar along with playback singer Shreya Ghoshal. Anjana Padmanabhan won the first edition of Indian Idol Junior.

A second season started on 30 May 2015. The new judges were Salim Merchant and Sonakshi Sinha, while Vishal Dadlani reprised his role as the judge. The show was hosted by Hussain Kuwajerwala and co-hosted by Asha Negi. Ananya Sritam Nanda was the winner for the second season.

A third season started in August. The judges of this season were Anu Malik and Sonakshi Sinha, while Vishal Dadlani reprised his role as the judge. The show was hosted by Manish Paul and co-hosted by Asha Negi.

== Summary ==
| Season | Year | Judges | | | Host | Channel | Contestants | Winner | Runner-up |
|---|---|---|---|---|---|---|---|---|---|
| IIJ S1 | 2013 | Vishal Dadlani | Shekhar Ravjiani | Shreya Ghoshal | Karan Wahi; Mandira Bedi | SET | 11 | Anjana Padmanabhan | Debanjana Karmakar |
| IIJ S2 | 2015 | Vishal Dadlani | ~~Shalmali Kholgade~~ | Salim Merchant | Hussain Kuwajerwala; Asha Negi | SET | 13 | Ananya Nanda | Nahid Afrin |
| IIJ S2 | 2015 | Vishal Dadlani | Sonakshi Sinha | Salim Merchant | Hussain Kuwajerwala; Asha Negi | SET | 13 | Ananya Nanda | Nahid Afrin |

== Season 1 ==
- Judges

Vishal Dadlani
Shreya Ghoshal
Shekhar Ravjiani

- Host

Karan Wahi
Mandira Bedi

=== Top 11 Contestants ===
| Name | Hometown | Result | Place |
|---|---|---|---|
| Anjana Padmanabhan | Bengaluru | Winner | 1st |
| Debanjana Karmakar | Kolkata | 1st Runner-up | 2nd |
| Anmol Jaswal | Jammu and Kashmir | 2nd Runner-up | 3rd |
| Nirvesh Dave | Ahmedabad | 3rd Runner-up | 4th |
| Sugandha Date | Nagpur | Eliminated | 5th |
| Sonakshi Kar | Cuttack | Eliminated | 6th |
| Priyam Borpatragohain | Assam | Eliminated | 7th |
| Akash Sharma | Haryana | Eliminated | 8th |
| Eman Chaudhary | Assam | Eliminated | 9th |
| Sankalp Yaduwanshi | Moradabad | Eliminated | 10th |
| Aryan Das | Moradabad | Eliminated | 11th |

== Season 2 ==
Indian Idol Junior Season 2 started on 30 May 2015, finished on 6 September 2015 as Grand Finale, and Also finished as ‘’Indian Idol Junior Ka Jalwa’’ 2-Hour Special Episode on 13 September 2015.

- Judges

Salim Merchant
Sonakshi Sinha replaced Shalmali Kholgade
Vishal Dadlani

- Host

Hussain Kuwajerwala
Asha Negi

=== Top 13 Contestants ===
| Name | Hometown | Result | Place |
|---|---|---|---|
| Ananya Sritam Nanda | Bhubaneswar | Winner | 1st |
| Nahid Afrin | Assam | 1st Runner-up | 2nd |
| Nithyashree Venkataramanan | Chennai | 2nd Runner-up | 3rd |
| Vaishnav Girish | Thrissur | Eliminated | 4th |
| Niharika Nath | Agartala | Eliminated | 5th |
| Moti Khan | Rajasthan | Eliminated | 6th |
| Ranita Banerjee | Kolkata | Eliminated | 7th |
| Sreelakshmi Belmannu | Bangalore | Eliminated | 8th |
| Ajay Brijwasi | Mathura | Eliminated | 9th |
| Yumna Ajin | Vengara | Eliminated | 10th |
| Surendra Singh Panwar | Rajasthan | Eliminated | 11th |
| Vidhi Jaswal | Jammu and Kashmir | Eliminated | 12th |
| Shubhankar | Kolkata | Eliminated | 13th |
