= Indian Idol =

Indian singing competition

- Created by: Simon Fuller
- Years: 2004–present

Miscellaneous
- Languages: Hindi; Marathi; Telugu; Tamil
- Produced by: Fremantle; ARSenic's Business Empire (2010–present); Miditech (2005–2009); Optimystix Entertainment (2004–2005)
- Based on: Pop Idol
- No.of Versions: 4
- No.of Seasons: 23
- Original network: Sony Pictures Networks (Hindi, Marathi, Tamil); Aha (Telugu)

Indian Idol is an Indian music competition television franchise based on the Pop Idol format. Several iterations of the series have been produced by different companies. The first series premiered in 2004 and there has been 18 seasons to date.

== Versions ==
Currently airing – 2
Upcoming for airing – 0
Recently concluded – 1
No longer airing – 1

Language	Show	Season	Year	Host	Judges				Network	Premiere	Finale	Contestants	Winner	Runner up
Hindi	Indian Idol	1	2004–05	Aman Verma Mini Mathur	Anu Malik	Farah Khan	Sonu Nigam		SET	30 October 2004	5 March 2005	12	Abhijeet Sawant	Amit Sana
Hindi	Indian Idol	2	2005–06	Aman Verma Mini Mathur	Anu Malik	Farah Khan	Sonu Nigam		SET	21 November 2005	22 April 2006	12	Sandeep Acharya	N. C. Karunya
Hindi	Indian Idol	3	2007	Hussain Kuwajerwala Mini Mathur	Anu Malik	Udit Narayan	Alisha Chinai	Javed Akhtar	SET	4 May 2007	23 September 2007	13	Prashant Tamang	Amit Paul
Hindi	Indian Idol	4	2008–09	Hussain Kuwajerwala Meiyang Chang	Anu Malik	Sonali Bendre	Kailash Kher	Javed Akhtar	SET	19 September 2008	1 March 2009	12	Sourabhee Debbarma	Kapil Thapa
Hindi	Indian Idol	5	2010	Hussain Kuwajerwala Abhijeet Sawant	Anu Malik	Sunidhi Chauhan	Salim Merchant		SET	26 April 2010	15 August 2010	13	Sreerama Chandra	Bhoomi Trivedi
Hindi	Indian Idol	6	2012	Hussain Kuwajerwala Mini Mathur	Anu Malik	Sunidhi Chauhan	Salim Merchant	Asha Bhosle	SET	1 June 2012	1 September 2012	16	Vipul Mehta	Amit Kumar
Hindi	Indian Idol Junior	7	2013	Karan Wahi Mandira Bedi	Vishal Dadlani	Shreya Ghoshal	Shekhar Ravjiani		SET	1 June 2013	1 September 2013	11	Anjana Padmanabhan	Debanjana Karmakar
Hindi	Indian Idol Junior	8	2015	Hussain Kuwajerwala Asha Negi	Vishal Dadlani	Salim Merchant	Sonakshi Sinha		SET	30 May 2015	6 September 2015	13	Ananya Nanda	Nahid Afrin
Hindi	Indian Idol	9	2016–17	Karan Wahi Paritosh Tripathi	Anu Malik	Farah Khan	Sonu Nigam		SET	18 December 2016	2 April 2017	14	L. V. Revanth	Khuda Baksh
Hindi	Indian Idol	10	2018	Manish Paul	Anu Malik	Vishal Dadlani	Neha Kakkar	Javed Ali	SET	7 July 2018	23 December 2018	14	Salman Ali	Ankush Bhardwaj
Hindi	Indian Idol	11	2019	Aditya Narayan	Anu Malik	Vishal Dadlani	Neha Kakkar	Himesh Reshammiya	SET	12 October 2019	23 February 2020	16	Sunny Hindustani	Rohit Shyam Raut
Hindi	Indian Idol	12	2020–21	Aditya Narayan	Vishal Dadlani		Neha Kakkar	Himesh Reshammiya	SET	28 November 2020	15 August 2021	15	Pawandeep Rajan	Arunita Kanjilal
Hindi	Indian Idol	13	2022–23	Aditya Narayan	Vishal Dadlani		Neha Kakkar	Himesh Reshammiya	SET	10 September 2022	2 April 2023	15	Rishi Singh	Deboshmita Roy
Hindi	Indian Idol	14	2023–24	Hussain Kuwajerwala	Vishal Dadlani		Shreya Ghoshal	Kumar Sanu	SET	7 October 2023	3 March 2024	15	Vaibhav Gupta	Subhadeep Das Chowdhury
Hindi	Indian Idol	15	2024–25	Aditya Narayan	Vishal Dadlani		Shreya Ghoshal	Badshah	SET	26 October 2024	6 April 2025	16	Manasi Ghosh	Subhajit Chakraborty
Hindi	Indian Idol	16	2025–26	Udit Narayan Aditya Narayan	Vishal Dadlani		Shreya Ghoshal	Badshah	SET	18 October 2025	26 July 2026	16+2=18	Jyotirmayee Nayak	Tanishk Shukla
Hindi	Indian Idol	17	2026–present	Aditya Narayan	Himesh Reshammiya				SET	17 October 2026	TBA	24 (12 pairs)	TBA	TBA
Marathi	Indian Idol Marathi	1	2021–22	Swanandi Tikekar Prajakta Mali	Ajay–Atul				Sony Marathi	22 November 2021	20 April 2022	15	Sagar Mhatre	Jagdish Chavan
Telugu	Telugu Indian Idol	1	2022	Sreerama Chandra	Thaman S	Karthik	Nithya Menen		Aha	25 February 2022	17 June 2022	12	BVK Vagdevi	Srinivas Darimisetty
Telugu	Telugu Indian Idol	2	2023	Hemachandra	Thaman S	Karthik	Geetha Madhuri		Aha	3 March 2023	4 June 2023	13	Soujanya Bhagavatula	Jayaram
Telugu	Telugu Indian Idol	3	2024	Sreerama Chandra	Thaman S	Karthik	Geetha Madhuri		Aha	14 June 2024	21 September 2024	13	Nazeeruddin Shaik	Aniruddh Suswaram
Telugu	Telugu Indian Idol	4	2025	Sreerama Chandra Sameera Baradwaj	Thaman S	Karthik	Geetha Madhuri		Aha	29 August 2025	1 November 2025	12	Brinda	Pavan Kalyan
Tamil	Tamil Idol	1	2026–27	Vikkals Vikram Pooja Venkat	Andrea Jeremiah	Karthik	Benny Dayal		Sony Vizha	24 October 2026	TBA		TBA	TBA
