= Indian Telly Award for Best Anchor =

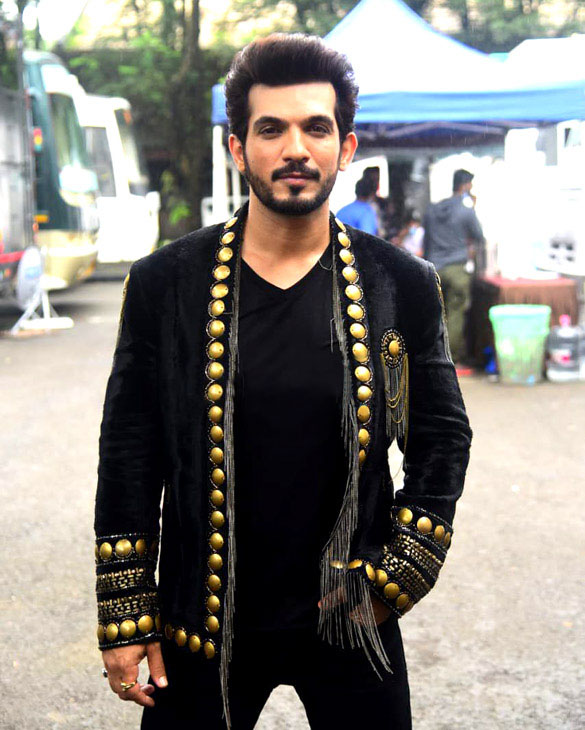
- The 2023 recipient: Arjun Bijlani
- Country: India
- Presented by: IndianTelevision.com
- First award: 2002
- Currently held by: Arjun Bijlani for Ravivaar With Star Parivaar
- Website: Indian Telly Awards

Indian Telly Award for Best Anchor is an award given by Indiantelevision.com as part of its annual Indian Telly Awards for TV serials, to recognize a person who has hosted a television reality show and been appreciated by the Indian audience.

== Superlatives ==
Superlative	Best Anchor	
Artiste with most awards	Amitabh Bachchan Manish Paul	3
Artiste with most nominations	Amitabh Bachchan; Salman Khan Manish Paul	4
Artiste with most nominations (without ever winning)	Aman Verma; Karan Johar; Jay Bhanushali	3

== List of winners (Popular) ==
=== 2000s ===
- 2001 Not Awarded
- 2002 Amitabh Bachchan – Kaun Banega Crorepati
  - Annu Kapoor – Closeup Antakshari
  - Harsha Bhogle – Harsha Online
  - Aman Verma – Khullja Sim Sim
  - Jaaved Jaffrey – Boogie Woogie
  - Sonali Bendre – Kya Masti Kya Dhoom
  - Sachin Pilgaonkar – Chalti Ka Naam Antakshari
  - Karan Thapar – Face To Face India
- 2003 Farooque Shaikh – Jeena Isi Ka Naam Hai
  - Aman Verma – Khullja Sim Sim
  - Simi Garewal – Rendezvous with Simi Garewal
  - Annu Kapoor – Antakshari
  - Pallavi Joshi – Antakshari
  - Rajat Sharma – Aaj Ki Baat
- 2004 Shekhar Suman – Carry On Shekhar
  - Farooque Shaikh – Jeena Isi Ka Naam Hai
  - Shaan – Sa Re Ga Ma Pa
  - Karan Thapar – Court Martial
  - Barkha Dutt – Various shows on NDTV 24x7
- 2005 Amitabh Bachchan – Kaun Banega Crorepati 2
  - Karan Johar – Koffee with Karan
  - Pooja Bedi – Just Pooja
  - Shaan – Sa Re Ga Ma Pa
  - Aman Verma & Mini Mathur – Indian Idol 1
- 2006 Shaan – Sa Re Ga Ma Pa Challenge 2005
  - Lola Kutty – Lola TV
  - Pooja Bedi – Just Pooja
  - Ravi Behl & Naved Jaffery – Boogie Woogie
  - Barkha Dutt – We The People
- 2007 Shahrukh Khan – Kaun Banega Crorepati 3
  - Aditya Narayan – Sa Re Ga Ma Pa Challenge 2007
  - Shaan – Amul Star Voice of India
  - Karan Johar – Koffee with Karan 2
  - Lola Kutty – Lola TV
- 2008 Salman Khan – Dus Ka Dum
  - Shaan – Amul Star Voice of India
  - Ravi Behl & Naved Jaffery – Boogie Woogie
  - Karan Singh Grover & Shweta Gulati – Zara Nachke Dikha
  - Akshay Kumar – Fear Factor: Khatron Ke Khiladi
  - Shahrukh Khan – Kya Aap Paanchvi Pass Se Tez Hain?
- 2009 Rajeev Khandelwal – Sacch Ka Saamna
  - Kiran Bedi – Aap Ki Kachehri
  - Salman Khan – Dus Ka Dum 2
  - Akshay Kumar – Fear Factor: Khatron Ke Khiladi
  - Farhan Akhtar – Oye! It's Friday!

=== 2010s ===
- 2010 Ravi Behl & Naved Jaffery – Boogie Woogie
  - Manish Paul – Dance India Dance Li'l Masters
  - Jay Bhanushali & Saumya Tandon – Dance India Dance (season 2)
  - Hussain Kuwajerwala – Indian Idol 5
  - Ronit Roy – Kitchen Champion
- 2011 No Award
- 2012 Amitabh Bachchan – Kaun Banega Crorepati 5
  - Ayushman Khurana – Just Dance
  - Jay Bhanushali & Saumya Tandon – Dance India Dance (season 3)
  - Karan Johar – Koffee with Karan 3
  - Priety Zinta – Guinness World Records- Ab India Todega
- 2013 Manish Paul – Jhalak Dikhhla Jaa 6
  - Anup Soni – Crime Patrol
  - Salman Khan – Bigg Boss 6
  - Aamir Khan – Satyamev Jayate
  - Amitabh Bachchan – Kaun Banega Crorepati 6
- 2014 Manish Paul & Kapil Sharma – Jhalak Dikhhla Jaa Season 7
  - Jay Bhanushali – Dance India Dance Super Mom
  - Karan Wahi & Gautam Rode – Nach Baliye 6
  - Rannvijay Singh- MTV Roadies X1 – Ride For Respect
  - Salman Khan – Bigg Boss 7
  - Rohit Shetty – Fear Factor: Khatron Ke Khiladi (season 5)
- 2019 Manish Paul – Indian Idol
  - 2021 Aditya Narayan – Indian Idol 12
  - Rohit Shetty – Fear Factor: Khatron Ke Khiladi 11
  - Ranveer Singh – The Big Picture
  - Rithvik Dhanjani & Paritosh Tripathi – Super Dancer 4
  - Salman Khan – Bigg Boss 15
  - Raghav Juyal – Dance Deewane 3
  - Raghav Juyal – Dance+6

=== 2020s ===
- 2023 Arjun Bijlani – Ravivaar With Star Parivaar
