= India Leadership Conclave =

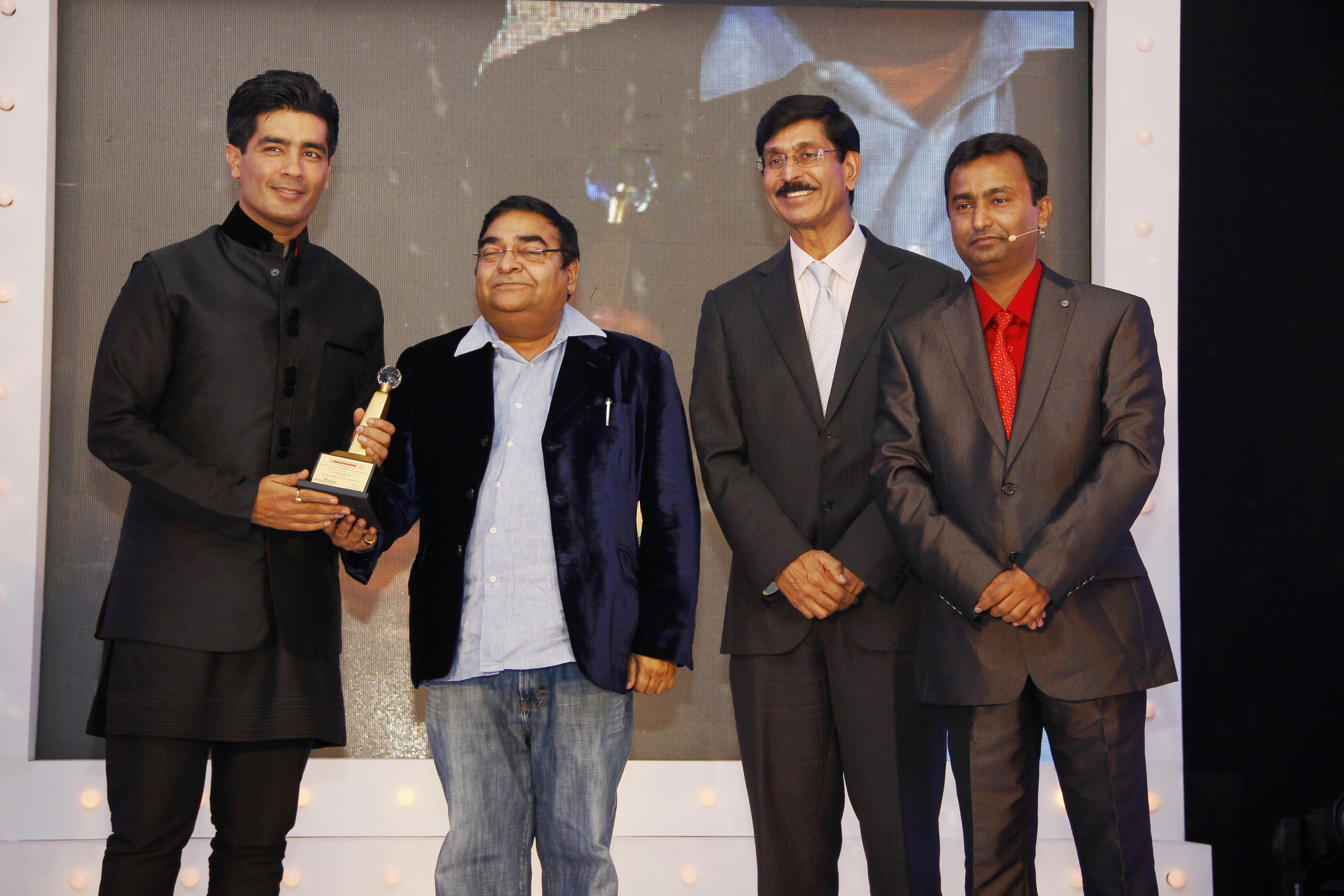
India Leadership Conclave 2013 Award Winning Moment

India Leadership Conclave is an annual industry event organised by Indian Affairs. Speakers address current issues at the annual conclave from Network 7 Media Group. In 2013, India Leadership Conclave themed the Conclave "New India - Agenda for Change". India Leadership Conclave in 2014 debated on "Perform or Perish" at a time when the National Election Campaigning was at its peak and Prime Minister Narendra Modi came to power.

== History ==
India Leadership Conclave also known as "ILC Power Brands" is an annual leadership event and award program awarded to companies and individuals that have excelled in their respective categories. These set of awards has been initiated by the organisers of Network 7 Media Group, under its chairman and Editor-In-Chief Satya Brahma. India Leadership Conclave was started in 2009 in Delhi and was subsequently followed by six annual editions in Mumbai and Bangalore.

== India Leadership Conclave 2016 ==
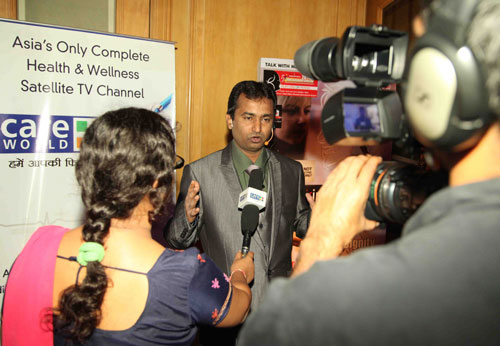
Satya Brahma at India Leadership Conclave

The 7th Annual India Leadership Conclave and Indian Affairs Business Leadership Awards 2016 was held in Mumbai on Friday, 1 July at Hotel Hilton Mumbai International Airport under the Make in India theme of "Advantage India - It is now or never" with 350 attendees.

== Award winners ==
Late Prime Minister of India Rajeev Gandhi was awarded posthumously in its first edition. Business people such as Yash Chopra, Mukesh Ambani, Uday Kotak, Sudha Murthy, and Chanda Kochhar among others received in its very first edition in 2009. Notable figures who received Awards include, Sushmita Sen, Ratan Tata, Mukesh Batra, Priyanka Chopra, Kiran Mazumdar Shaw, Kunal Bahl, Nagabhairava Jaya Prakash Narayana, Mukesh Hariawala, Anamika Khanna, Manasi Kirloskar, Huzaifa Khorakiwala, Parvathy Nair, Urvashi Rautela, Sunny Leone, Arshi Khan, Jennifer Winget, Reza Shariffi, Bhairavi Jaikishan, Shaina NC, Muffazal Lakdawala, Ashok Soota, Sanjay Leela Bhansali, Govinda, Manjula Anagani.

== India Leadership Conclave 2017 ==
The 8th Annual India Leadership Conclave & ILC Power Brand Awards was held under the theme "Introspection" on Friday, 4 August, Hotel Sahara Star, Mumbai, India. Surjya Narayan Patro, Odisha's Minister for Food Supplies and Consumer Affairs received "India’s Best Performing Minister in a state in India".

== India Leadership Conclave 2018 ==
India Leadership Conclave's 9th Annual edition was held under the theme on "Introspection – Agenda 2018" at Mumbai on 6 July 2018.

== India Leadership Conclave 2019 ==
The 10th Annual India Leadership Conclave & Indian Affairs Business Leadership awards also called as ILC Power Brand Awards was held in Mumbai on Friday, 23 August 2019 at Hotel Sahara Star, Mumbai, India. The theme of the Conclave was "Opportunities - Making India USD 5 trillion Economy".

== India Leadership Conclave 2020 ==
Network 7 Media Group organised the 11th Annual edition of India Leadership Conclave & Indian Affairs Power Brand Awards 2020 virtually on Saturday, 26 December 2020 under the theme - Rebuilding India : Opportunities in the pandemic. Noted voices around the world shared their views on diverse topics. Satya Brahma, Chairman & Editor-In-Chief, Network 7 Media Group gave the welcome address on Billion Hopes, Solomon Darwin addressed on Smart Cities VS Smart Villages : Challenges & Opportunities, Dipak Gyawali spoke on Why Re-Imagining Nepal-India Relations Matters in Facing an Uncertain New World Order, Rajiv Nath of Hindustan Syringes & Medical Devices Ltd addressed on COVID-19 vaccine : Building Logistics for the Vaccination Distribution. ILC Power Brand Awards were conferred virtually to the achievers who performed well despite COVID-19 pandemic. Notable awardees included Birla Soft Pride Group of Hotels, LTG Infrastructure, Surana College, LatentView Analytics.

== India Leadership Conclave 2021 ==
The 12th Annual Edition of India Leadership Conclave & Indian Affairs Power Brand Awards was held in Mumbai on 29 August 2021 in Mumbai under the theme Reforms - Perform or Perish where Leaders across the Industry verticals deliberated key & pressing issues of the country. Mahesh Lingareddy of Smartron, Manodh Mohan, of Skyislimit Technologies, Dr.Satya Vadlamani of Murlikrishna Pharma, Dr. Debraj Shome, Dr. Sudhakar Shinde, CEO, Ayushman Bharat, Maharashtra & Dr. BU Abdullah, special guest at the leadership event addressed the Conclave. ILC Power Brand Awards 2021 were conferred to industry leaders.

Madhu Pandit Dasa, Dr. Nitin. N Kadam, Rajesh Mehta of Rajesh Exports, Mahesh Lingareddy, Dr. Keyur Parikh, Sneha Agarwal of Hotel Hillock, Masumi Mewawalla, Actor Sanjay Khan are among others who were awarded.

== India Leadership Conclave 2024 ==
Network 7 Media Group's flagship annual event, the 13th Annual Edition of India Leadership Conclave & Indian Affairs Power Brand Awards was held in Mumbai on 18 May 2024 under the theme Governance. The Annual Conclave was addressed by Industry leaders, policy makers & start up Entrepreneurs. Satya Brahma, Chairman & Editor-In-Chief of Network 7 Media Group delivered the opening address stressing the need for transparency in governance, accountability & policy needed to build a vibrant democracy.

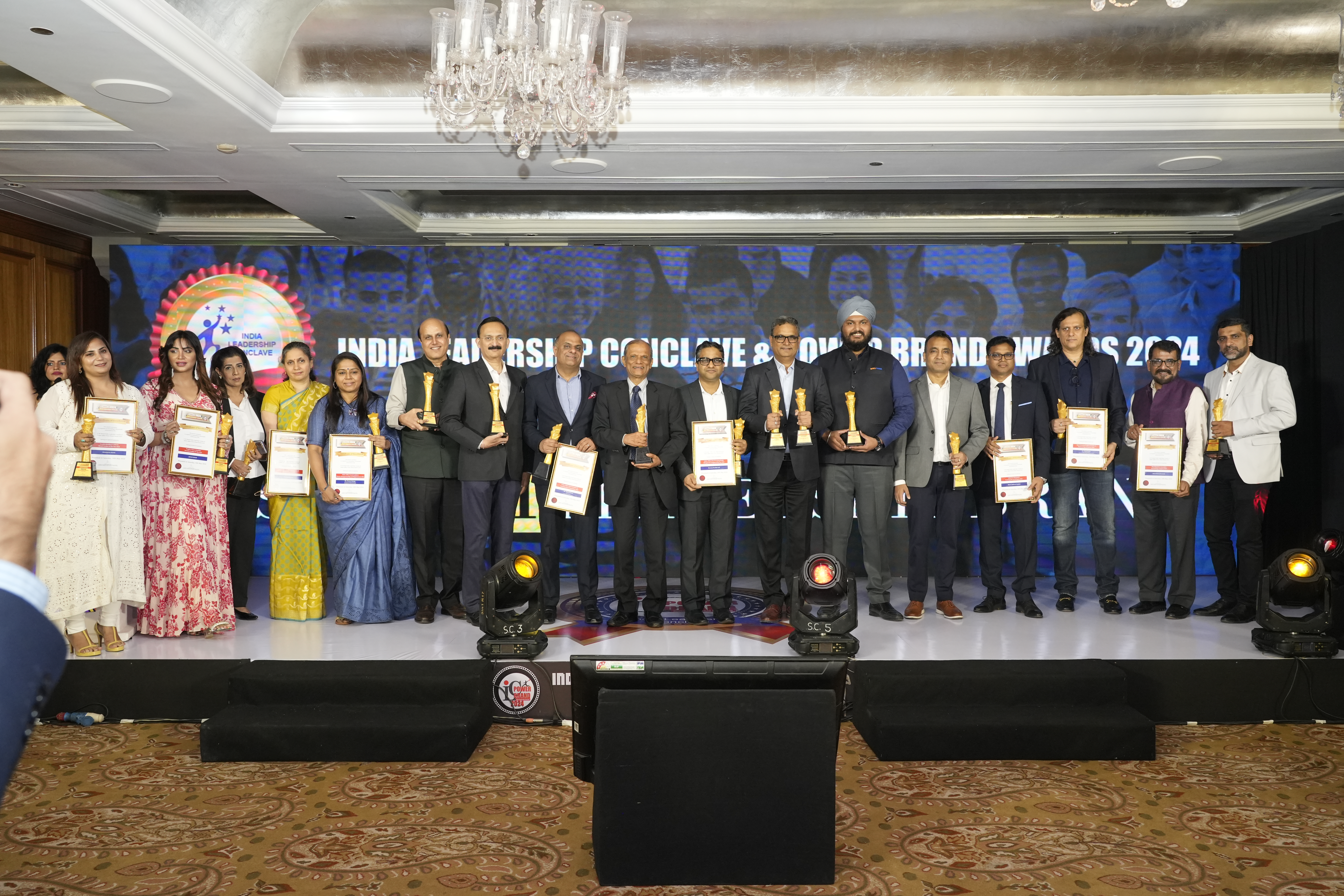
Industry Leaders at the 13th Annual India Leadership Conclave 2024

Business Leaders, Healthcare Experts, Social Activists, Entrepreneurs were awarded in the annual Conclave & Awards.

== India Leadership Conclave 2025 ==
The 14th Annual India Leadership Conclave & Power Brand Awards 2025 was successfully held on 28 November 2025 at Hotel Mumbai International Airport, Mumbai, India. Organized under the theme “India@3: Power, Purpose & People”, the conclave brought together prominent industry leaders, policymakers, and innovators to deliberate on issues of leadership, governance, and business excellence.

The event featured keynote addresses and panel discussions by distinguished figures from diverse sectors. Among the award recipients were Rajiv Podar (Podar Enterprise), Niki Sawansukha, Puneet Kaura (Samtel Avionics), Sheenam Ohrie (Broadridge India), Krithika Subrahmanian (Sreshta Leisure), Hina Nagarajan (Diageo), Satya Vadlamani, and Rajiv Nath, recognized for their contributions to industry and society.

The awards ceremony was presided over by Padma Shri Dr. Mukesh Batra, Founder & Chairman Emeritus of Dr Batra's Healthcare, alongside Satya Brahma, Founder & Editorial Head of Network 7 Media Group. The conclave witnessed the participation of over 250 distinguished industry leaders, reinforcing its position as one of India's notable platforms for leadership recognition and dialogue.

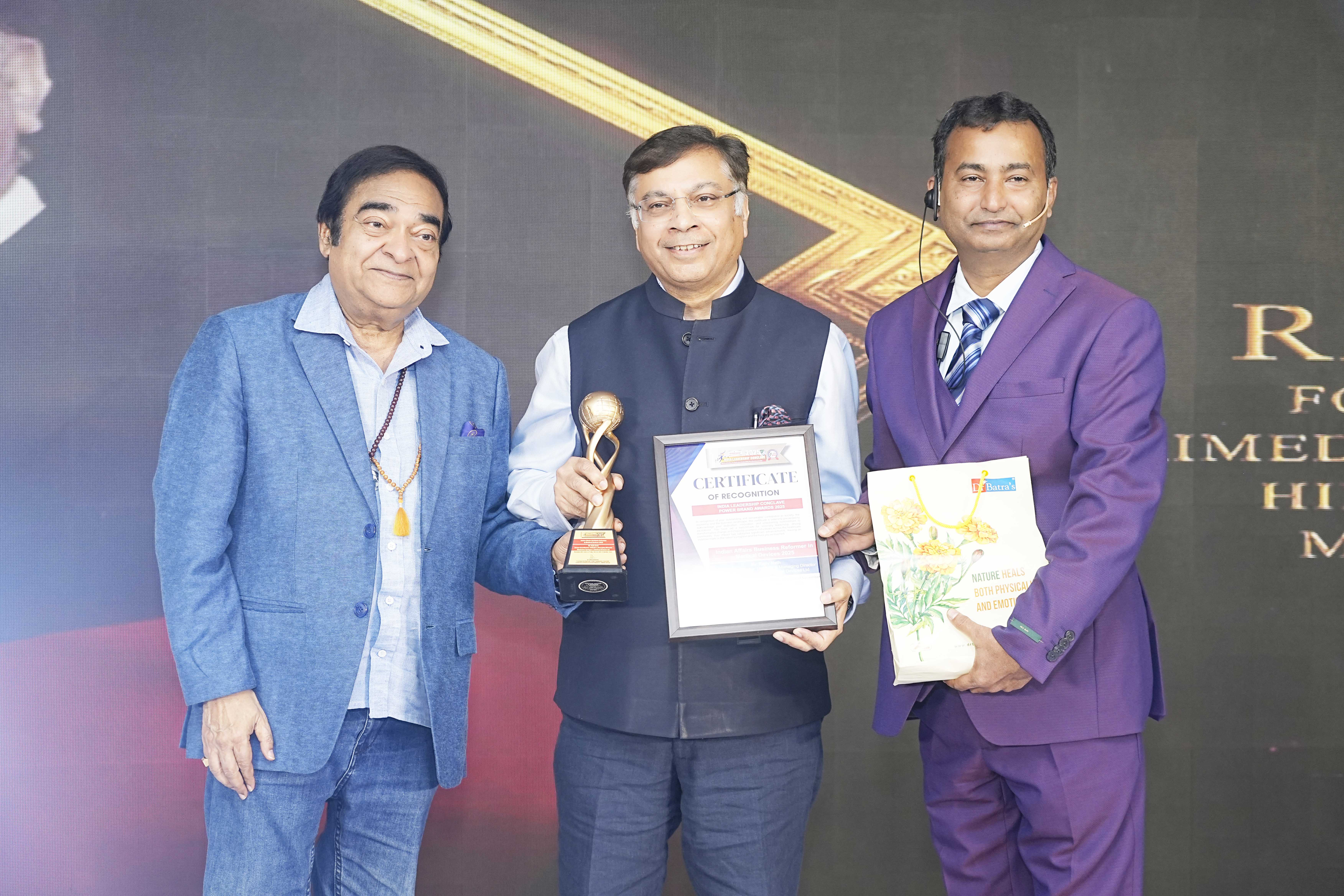
Rajiv Nath, Mukesh Batra & satya Brahma at India Leadership Conclave 2025 Award Ceremony

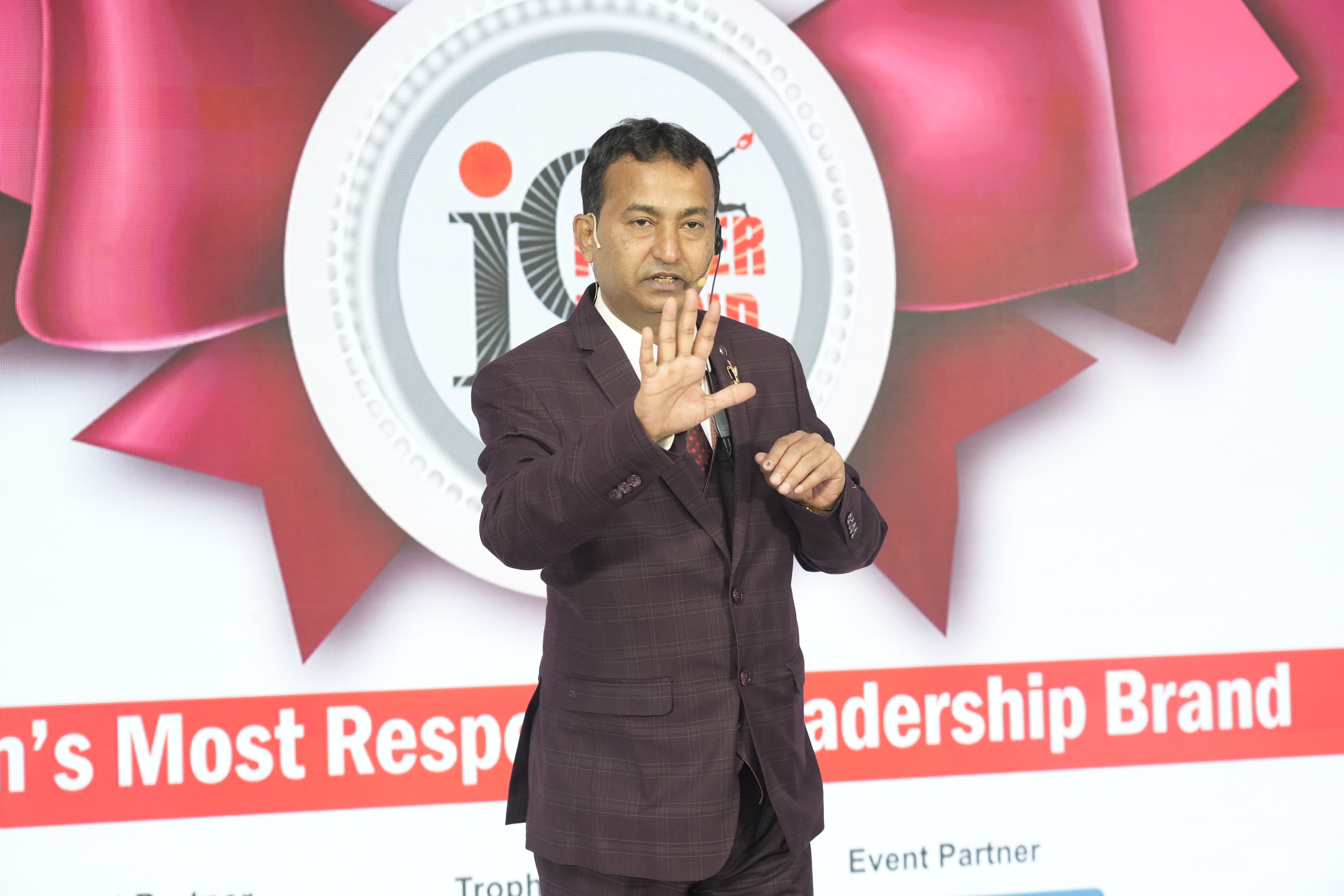
Dr Satya Brahma addressing the conclave on theme Governance at India Leadership Conclave 2024.
