= Akashdeep (disambiguation) =

Akashdeep is a 1965 Indian Hindi film.

Akashdeep may also refer to:

- Sheeba Akashdeep, Indian actress
- Akashdeep S Batth (born 1992), Indian Punjabi film director and writer
- Akashdeep Saigal, Indian model and a television actor
- Akashdeep Singh (born 1994), Indian field hockey player
- Akashdeep Singh Kahlon (born 1993), Indian footballer
- Akashdeep, an Indian aerostat developed by the Aerial Delivery Research and Development Establishment
