= Madhu Pandit Dasa =

Spiritual leader

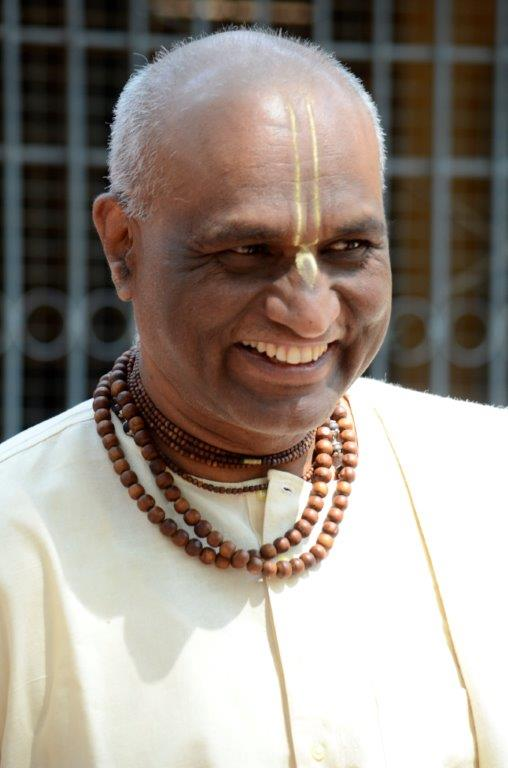
- Born: Madhusudhan S Trivandrum, India
- Education: M.Tech Civil Engineering (IIT Bombay)
- Known for: Spiritual leader, President of ISKCON Temple, Bangalore, Chairman of Akshaya Patra Foundation, Chairman of Vrindavan Chandrodaya Mandir
- Spouse: Bhakti Latha Devi Dasi
- Website: http://www.madhupanditdasa.com/

Madhu Pandit Dasa is a spiritual leader, the President of ISKCON Bangalore. As a humanitarian, he has been actively involved in programs like Akshaya Patra that provides mid-day meals to children studying in Government schools. He is the Founder and Chairman of The Akshaya Patra Foundation, guiding the organisation to realise the vision – "No child in India shall be deprived of education because of hunger”. The Government of India has conferred upon him the prestigious Padma Shri Award in recognition of the distinguished service rendered by Akshaya Patra Foundation for the children of India. He is also the Chairman of Vrindavan Chandrodaya Mandir, the upcoming iconic cultural and heritage complex in Vrindavan. Sri Madhu Pandit Dasa is also the Chairman of Basil Woods Institutions.

== Biography ==
Madhu Pandit Dasa, originally a student of science, achieved recognition through a national talent search program during his pre-degree years. After attending IIT-Bombay, he dedicated his life to the mission of A.C. Bhaktivedanta Swami Prabhupada. Over nearly three decades, he has engaged in various initiatives aimed at improving the quality of life for millions of people in India. In addition to his work in the social sector, he has developed innovative approaches to present India’s ancient cultural ethos within a modern scientific and technological framework.

== The Akshaya Patra Foundation ==
July 2000 saw the beginning of an initiative led by Madhu Pandit Dasa – the Akshaya Patra Foundation. The purpose of the Foundation was to serve underprivileged children by providing mid-day meals at Government schools of Bengaluru Rural District. To meet the requirement of preparing meals in large quantity, a centralised kitchen was designed by Madhu Pandit Dasa. He also gave the Foundation a working Governance Model, where transparency and accountability are the core values. Based on these values, Akshaya Patra has become one of the few trustworthy NGOs in the country. Demonstrating this point, Akshaya Patra has been awarded the Institute of Chartered Accountants of India (ICAI)’s Gold Shield Award for Excellence in Financial Reporting consecutively five times, placing the Foundation in its Hall of Fame. Akshaya Patra has spanned 25 years and has grown from providing mid-day meals to 1,500 children to 2.2 million children everyday across the country.

== Inspiration ==
The teachings of Srila Prabhupada, the Founder-Acharya of ISKCON and the Inspiration behind the Akshaya Patra programme has been Madhu Pandit Dasa's guiding light throughout his journey as a missionary. Srila Prabhupada’s biography inspired Madhu Pandit Dasa to join the International Society of Krishna Consciousness (ISKCON).

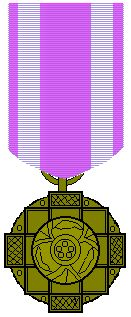
Padma Shri Award

== Honors and recognition ==
- National Living Legend Award
- Padma Shri award on 67th Republic Day by the Government of India.

(The award has been conferred in recognition of the distinguished service rendered by Akshaya Patra Foundation for the children of India.)

- Distinguished Alumnus Award 2010 by the Indian Institute of Technology Bombay
- Distinguished International Gandhi peace award in 2019 for his contribution towards society by feeding midday meals to the school going poor children, marking a remarkable 3-billion plus meals
- Honorary Doctorate by the Bangalore University during its 56th Annual convocation for his selfless service over the last four decades in the field of food security and community welfare
- Honorary Doctorate by Poornima University, Rajasthan for his service to humanity
