= Hum Ladkiyan =

- {romotional logo
- Also known as: Hum Ladkiyan - Maayke Se Sasural Tak
- Created by: Emotion Pictures
- Written by: Sharad tripathi
- Directed by: Arvind Babbal & Manesh Om Singhania
- Starring: see below
- Opening theme: "Hum Ladkiyan" by
- Country of origin: India
- No. of episodes: 128

Production
- Producer: Anirudh Pathak
- Cinematography: Ravi Naidu & Shyamanand Jha
- Running time: approximately 25 minutes

Original release
- Network: Sony TV
- Release: 13 October 2008 – 21 May 2009

Hum Ladkiyan - Maayke Se Sasural Tak was a Hindi television drama series that first aired on 13 October 2008 on Sony TV channel. The story focused on the life journey of the four vivacious girls.

== Plot ==
The story is set in Benaras, the holy city of India, and depicts the lives of four young women: Sapna, Pooja, Ajju, and Alka. It unveils the aspirations, friendship, and desires of these simple girls. Despite living in a small city, the girls enjoy every moment of their lives – from wandering around on the banks of the Ganges river to chatting away on their terrace. They look forward to going to college, where they find life different, far from their sheltered and protected homes. But they still hold onto themselves while exploring their new lives. While they realize the ways of the real world, they face life as it comes. But what happens when it is time for their marriage? Nobody knows how their journey will be, not even their families who cannot imagine living life without their precious daughters.

== Cast ==
- Tapeshwari Sharma ... Pooja (love interest of Aalap, protagonist)
- Urmila Tiwari ... Anjalika a.k.a. Ajju (Kanhaiya Jaiswal's daughter, love interest of Yuvraj Goel, protagonist)
- Pallavi Gupta ... Sapna (love interest of Rahul, protagonist)
- Toshika Verma/Preeti Chaudhary ... Alka (Kailash Nath's daughter, believed to be married to Aalap, protagonist)
- Rajendra Gupta ... Thakur Ayodhya Singh (Grandfather of Rahul and Alka)
- Seema Bhargav ... Dadiji (Grandmother of Pooja and Sapna)
- Virendra Saxena
- Nitesh Pandey ... Kailash Nath (Subhadra's husband, Alka's father)
- Ashok Lokhande ... Kanhaiya Jaiswal (Rama's husband, Ajju's father)
- Nitika Anand (TV actress) ... Sushma (Pooja's aunt, Sapna's mother)
- Jaanvi Sangwan ... Rama (Kanhaiya's wife, Ajju's mother)
- Sonal Jha ... Subhadra (Kailash's wife, Alka's mother)
- Nandish Sandhu ... Rahul (Alka's brother who loves Sapna)
- Girish Sachdev
- Manoj Goel ... Ved (Ajju's brother in-law who sells her father's property by fraud, antagonist)
- Manish Naggdev ... Aalap (Adopted brother of Ajju who loves Pooja, believed to be married to Alka)
- Gautam Sharma ... Siddharth (Pooja's ex-fiance who breaks the relationship after knowing that Pooja is in love with Aalap)
- Karan Mehra ... Yuvraj Goel (business tycoon who buys the property of Ajju's father, in love with Ajju)
- Sonika Sahay ... Naina Goel (Yuvraj's sister, hates Ajju and her family, tries to destroy them in every way possible, antagonist)
