= Shraddha Nigam =

Indian film and television actress

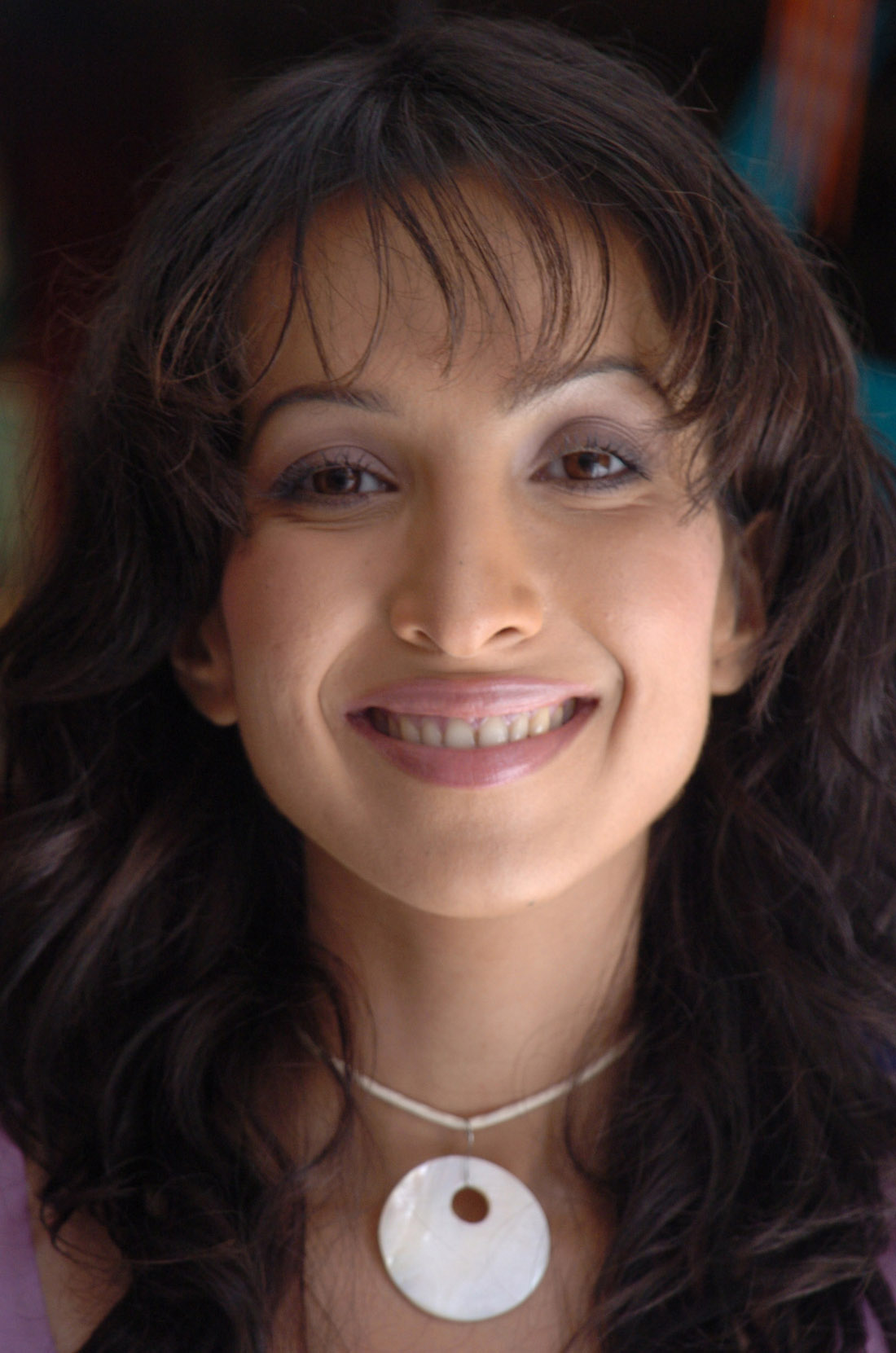
- Nigam at the 36th International Film Festival of India in Goa, 2005
- Occupation: Actress
- Spouses: Karan Singh Grover (m. 2008; div. 2009); Mayank Anand (m. 2012)

Shraddha Nigam is an Indian film and television actress, who has appeared in Malayalam and Hindi films as well as television serials.

== Career ==
Shraddha's film debut was Poonilamazha, a 1997 Malayalam film. Her Hindi debut was in Josh in 2000. She later acted in few Hindi films. Her TV debut was the serial Choodiyan. The Times of India wrote that her role as the female lead in Krishna Arjun "stole hearts". In 2010, Shraddha began to focus on her fashion design line. In 2012, she was offered a role opposite Anuj Saxena in a show produced by Bhairavi Raichura.

== Personal life ==
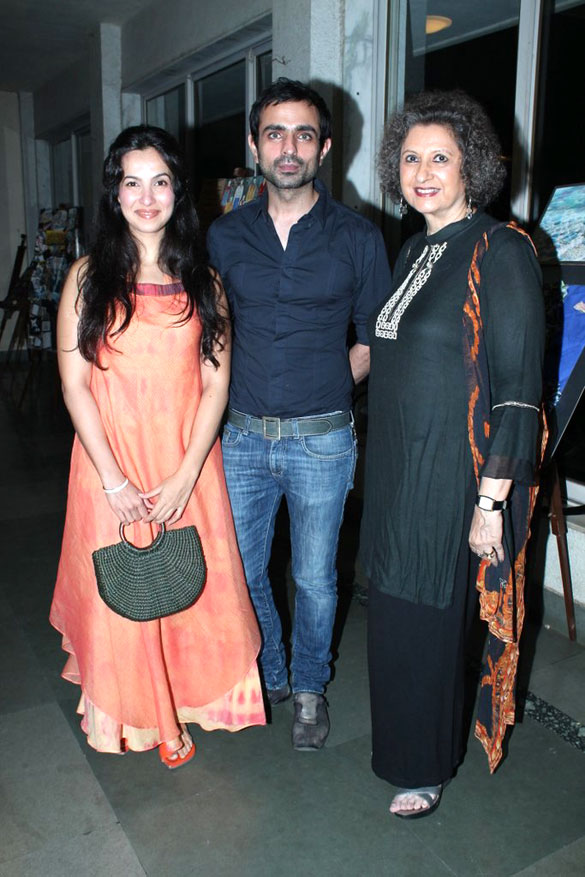
Shraddha Nigam and Mayank Anand at Shalom fashion show

In 2008, Shraddha married television actor Karan Singh Grover. They divorced 10 months later following reports of his affair with choreographer Nicole Alvarez. In 2012, she married Mayank Anand; the couple have jointly owned a fashion line, MASN, since 2011.

== Filmography ==
=== Films ===
Key
†	Denotes films that have not yet been released

Year	Title	Role	Notes
1996	Apne Dam Par	Divya Saxena	
1997	Poonilamazha	Anu	Malayalam
2000	Josh	Prakash Sharma's girlfriend	
2000	Aaghaaz	Ratna	
2000	Aazad	Only Song	Telugu
2001	Aśoka		
2002	The Truth ... Yathharth		
2004	Athade Oka Sainyam	Champa	
2007	Partition	Manjula	
2007	Say Salaam India		
2008	Jack N Jhol	Pammy	
2010	Lahore	Neela Chaudhary	

=== Television ===
- Choodiyan ... Rushali
- Krishna Arjun ... Detective Krishna
- Kahaani Ghar Ghar Kii
- Thodi Si Zameen Thoda Sa Aasmaan
- Dekho Magar Pyaar Se ... Nikita Malhotra
- Tu Kahe Agar
- Pyaar Ishq Mohabbat
- Rangbarangi
- Saathiya
- Mano Ya Naa Mano
- Jeena Isi Ka Naam Hai ... as a friend of Hussain Kuwajerwala
- Filmy Cocktail (Host)
- The Best of Sa Re Ga Ma Pa Challenge 2007 (Host)
- Nach Baliye 3 ... performance in one episode with Karan Singh Grover
- Shree Adi Manav ... special appearance in first two episodes as Karishma
- Crime Patrol ... Aruna Shanbaug
- Kalakarz (Host)
- Mistry (2025)
