= Aman Verma (actor) =

Indian television anchor and actor (born 1971)

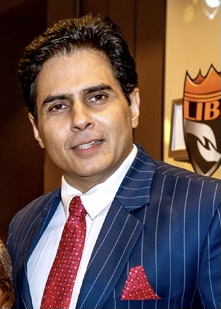
- Verma in 2019
- Born: 11 October 1971 (age 55); Bombay (present–day Mumbai), Maharashtra, India
- Occupations: Actor; Television presenter
- Years active: 1992–present
- Known for: Kyunki Saas Bhi Kabhi Bahu Thi; Ek Hazaaron Mein Meri Behna Hai; SuperCops Vs Super Villains; Bigg Boss 9
- Spouse: Vandana Lalwani (m. 2016; div. 2025)

Aman Yatan Verma (born 11 October 1971) is an Indian television anchor and actor. Verma is best known for role in Ekta Kapoor's soap opera Kyunki Saas Bhi Kabhi Bahu Thi as Anupam Kapadia and for hosting the game show Khullja Sim Sim both on Star Plus from 2001 to 2004. His other hosting duties were with Mini Mathur in the first season of Indian Idol on Sony TV and Zee TV's Zee Cinestars. He has also acted in Bollywood movies. Verma was also seen in Life OK's show Hum Ne Li Hai- Shapath as ACP Diler Kumar. He also participated in the ninth season of Indian reality series Bigg Boss.

== Career ==
Verma made his acting debut in the TV serial Pachpan Khambe Laal Deewarein with Mita Vashisht in 1993. He also played the character of Vrishaketu, son of Karna, in Mahabharat Katha. Then he started his film career with, Sangharsh (1999), portraying a supporting role. A turning point in his career was when he portrayed the role of Anupam Kapadia for four years in Kyunki Saas Bhi Kabhi Bahu Thi by Ekta Kapoor that became the biggest hit on Indian television. In 2002, Verma portrayed the lead role of SP Adityapratap Singh in Kehta Hai Dil, for which he won the Indian Telly Award for Best Actor in a Lead Role - Male in 2003.

In 2003, Verma starred in the film Pran Jaye Par Shaan Na Jaye as the solo lead opposite Rinke Khanna and in the film Koi Hai. In both films, he portrayed solo leads. Later that year, he portrayed a supporting role in Baghban (2003), which starred Amitabh Bachchan and Hema Malini in lead roles. Verma anchored the game show, Khullja Sim Sim on Star Plus from 2001 to 2004, until he was replaced by TV actor, Hussain Kuwajerwala, who was his co-star in Kyunki Saas Bhi Kabhi Bahu Thi. The two also starred together in another serial Kumkum – Ek Pyara Sa Bandhan, which aired on Star Plus.

Verma has made special appearances in films through his career as an anchor. He also portrayed a comedy role of Zubin in Jaan-E-Mann (2006). In that same year, Verma portrayed his first lead role in a TV serial on Viraasat, portraying a negative role.

He was in a TV serial Teen Bahuraniyaan playing the role of a man called Sumit Desai who was in a coma for the past few years whose children died but did not know it. He was also part of the first season of a reality show on Sony TV Iss Jungle Se Mujhe Bachao, which is inspired from the British reality show I'm a Celebrity...Get Me Out of Here! He played a lead role as Advocate Kunal Mehra in Sony TV's Bayttaab Dil Kee Tamanna Hai. In 2012, he acted in Ek Hazaaron Mein Meri Behna Hai. In 2015, he participated in Colors TV's Bigg Boss 9 as a contestant and got evicted after six weeks.

He played the character of an advocate in Hindi feature film JD directed by Shailendra Pandey.

== Controversies ==
Verma was the target of a casting couch sting operation which was aired on India TV in March 2003. He was seen begging Suhaib Ilyasi to remove his footage from the sting operation. Verma sued India TV CEO Rajat Sharma, programme manager Suhaib Ilyasi and journalist Ruchi, who was involved in the operation, alleging that the channel wanted to "blackmail and extort money" from him.

== Filmography ==
=== Films ===
Year	Movie	Role	Notes:
1999	Sangharsh	Amit	
2002	Jaani Dushman: Ek Anokhi Kahani	TV Host	
2003	Koi Hai	Raj Malhotra	
2003	Pran Jaye Par Shaan Na Jaye	Aman Joshi	
2003	Andaaz	Karan Singhania	
2003	Baghban	Ajay Malhotra	
2004	Tum - A Dangerous Obsession	Yusuf Malik	
2005	Home Delivery: Aapko... Ghar Tak	Hitesh	
2005	Vaah! Life Ho Toh Aisi!	Magic Show Presenter	
2005	Dosti: Friends Forever	Mr. Saluja (Anjali's husband)	
2006	Kachchi Sadak	Raghav Mehta	
2006	Unns: Love... Forever	Advocate Sameer Shah	
2006	Baabul	Shobhna's Brother	
2006	Janani	Tarun Awasthi	
2006	Jaan-E-Mann	Zubin	
2008	Superstar		
2008	Lakh Pardesi Hoiye	Garry	Punjabi film
2008	EMI	Prema's husband	
2008	Deshdrohi	Sanjay Narayan Srivastav	
2010	Ek Second... Jo Zindagi Badal De?		
2010	Mar Jawan Gur Khake	Karan	Punjabi film
2010	Tees Maar Khan	Chaterjee	
2011	Gandhi to Hitler	Balbir Singh	
2011	U R My Jaan	Rahul	
2012	Daal Mein Kuch Kaala Hai		
2014	Dee Saturday Night		
2017	JD	Advocate Pradhan	
2019	Chicken Curry Law		
2023	Lakeerein	Ravi Verma	
2024	The U P Files		

=== Television ===
Year	Serial	Role	Notes	Refs
1992	Hota Ek Ghar Aas Paas	Ajju beta		
	Karawas			
1993	Pachpan Khambe Lal Deewarein	Neel		
1994–1998	Shanti	Sanjay		
1997	Mahabharat Katha	Vrishaketu		
1997–1998	Zanjeerein			
1998–1999	Rishtey		episodic Role	
1998–1999	Rishtey		episode 22	
1998–1999	Rishtey	Rohit	episode 55	
1998	Aurat	Karan Pratapsingh	Supporting role	
1998–2006	C.I.D.	Anuj	episodes 15–16	
1998–2006	C.I.D.	Akash	episodes 59–60	
1998–2006	C.I.D.	Johnny	episode 405	
1998	Saturday Suspense	Vicky	episode 88	
1999–2000	X Zone		episodes 82–83	
1999-2003	Aangan			
2000	Ghar Ek Mandir	Prem		
2000	C.A.T.S.		episodic role	
2000	Thriller At 10	A.C.P. Roop Singh Rathore	episodes 56–60	
2000	Thriller At 10	Aman Verma	episodes 116–120	
2001	Sambandh	Mr. Kumar		
2001–2003	Gharana	Prakash Kothari		
2001–2004	Dushman	Prem Verma		
2001–2004	Kyunki Saas Bhi Kabhi Bahu Thi	Anupam Kapadia		
2001–2004	Do Lafzon Ki Kahani	Raj		
2001–2004	Khullja Sim Sim	Host		
2002–2003	Kalash	Ram		
2002–2003	Kehta Hai Dil	SP Adityapratap Singh		
2003	Piya Ka Ghar	Raj		
2003–2004	Arzoo Hai Tu			
2004	Jadoo	Host		
2004	Devi	Vasudev Kumar		
2004	India's Best Cinestars Ki Khoj	Host		
2004–2005	Indian Idol	Host		
2004–2005	Kumkum – Ek Pyara Sa Bandhan	Abhay Chauhan		
2005	Jassi Jaissi Koi Nahin	Advocate Thakral		
2005	Dial One Aur Jeeto	Host		
2005	Ek Ladki Anjaani Si	Suryapratap Yadav		
2006	Piya Kay Ghar Jana Hai			
2006–2007	Viraasat	Rishabh Lamba		
2007–2008	Amber Dhara	Shanu		
2007–2008	Say Shava Shava	Contestant		
2007–2008	Teen Bahuraaniyaan	Sumeet Desai		
2007–2008	Sujata	Viresh Shah		
2007–2008	Saas v/s Bahu	Guest		
2009	Namak Haraam	Rohit Malhotra		
2009	Ladies Special	Host of Lottery contest		
2009	Iss Jungle Se Mujhe Bachao	Contestant		
2009–2010	Bayttaab Dil Kee Tamanna Hai	Advocate Kunal Mehra		
2010	Keshav Pandit	Aditya		
2010	Shorr	Sarang		
2010–2011	Na Aana Is Des Laado	Bhanupratap Singh		
2011–2012	Chotti Bahu - Sawar Ke Rang Rachi	Asur / Vishwanath		
2011–2012	Ramleela - Ajay Devgn Ke Saath	Ravan		
2013	Welcome – Baazi Mehmaan Nawazi Ki	Contestant		
2013	Parvarrish - Kuchh Khattee Kuchh Meethi	Advocate Raghav Jaitley (RJ)		
2013–2015	SuperCops vs Supervillains	ACP Diler Kumar		
2015–2017	Savdhaan India	Inspector Rajendra Mishra	episode 1065	
2015–2017	Savdhaan India	Mahesh	episode 2162	
2015	Hazir Jawab Birbal	Mohanlal	episode 40	
2015	Bigg Boss 9	Contestant	Evicted Day 42	
2016	Amma	Shekeran Shetty		
2017	Khaki Ek Vachan	Host		
2017–2018	Bahurani	Host		
2021	Mauka-E-Vardaat: Operation Vijay	Inspector Abhay Talwar		
2022–2023	Dheere Dheere Se	Bhanu Shastri		
2024	Mishri	Hari Sharma (Episode 1)	Episodic Role	
2026	Yeh Fitoor Tera	Roop Mathur		
2026	Kyunki Saas Bhi Kabhi Bahu Thi 2	Anupam Kapadia		

=== Web series ===
Year	Show	Role	Notes	Refs
2019	Panchali	Eldest Brother		
2019–present	Julie	Inspector		
2023	Scam 2003	Police Commissioner Jagdish Puri		

== Awards ==
Year	Award	Category	TV Show	Result
2003	Indian Telly Awards	Best Actor in a Lead Role - Male	Kehta Hai Dil	Won
2015	Indian Television Academy Awards	Best Actor in a Negative Role	Viraasat	Won
