= Batth =

Batth is a surname. Notable people with the surname include:

- Akashdeep S Batth (born 1992), Indian film director
- Danny Batth (born 1990), English footballer
- Erin Batth (born 1978), American basketball coach
- Karam Batth, Indian actor and producer
- Kirpal Singh Batth (born 1992), Indian discus thrower
