= Aditi Govitrikar =

Indian television actress (born 1976)

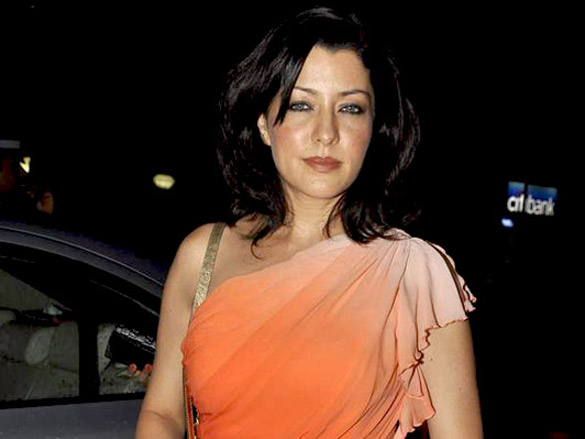
- Govitrikar in 2011
- Born: 21 May 1976 (age 50); Panvel, Maharashtra, India
- Occupations: Actress, Model, Doctor
- Height: 1.70 m (5 ft 7 in)
- Spouse: Muffazal Lakdawala (m. 1998; div. 2009)
- Children: 2
- Beauty pageant titleholder
- Title: Gladrags Megamodel 1996; Gladrags Mrs. India 2001; Mrs. World 2001
- Major competitions: Gladrags Megamodel 1996 (Winner); Gladrags Mrs. India 2001 (Winner); Mrs. World (2001) (Winner) (Best in Swimsuit)
- Website: aditigovitrikar.com

Aditi Govitrikar (born 21 May 1976) is an Indian actress, physician and former model. She is the first Indian woman to win the Mrs. World title in 2001. From 1997 to 2004, Govitrikar remained the only Indian supermodel with both a medical doctor and a psychologist qualification. She has been touted by Hindustan Times as "Beauty with Brains". She is a vegetarian and ardent Vipassana practitioner. She was a contestant on Fear Factor: Khatron Ke Khiladi 1 and Bigg Boss 3. Govitrikar won the Gladrags Megamodel Contest in 1996 and the Gladrags Mrs. India in 2000, subsequently winning Mrs. World Contest in 2001. She ventured into acting when she played a prominent role in Thammudu (1999), a movie that was a runaway hit. She went on to act in many movies including Paheli (2005) India's official entry to the 79th Academy Awards and De Dana Dan (2009), that won an award at the International Indian Film Academy Award. She also played a leading role in several super hit music videos such as Kabhi to Nazar Milao by Adnan Sami and Asha Bhosle (1997) and Aaeena by Jagjit Singh (2000). In 2020, she hosted the show Mother's Care on Zee Zest. She launched PETA in India and has also endorsed top tier international brands such as Coca-Cola, Chopard, Fendi and Harry Winston.

== Early life ==
Govitrikar was born in Panvel, Maharashtra on 21 May 1976. After attending Barns High School in Panvel, she subsequently went to Grant Medical College in Mumbai where she graduated with an MBBS medical degree in 1997. After completing her MBBS, Govitrikar ventured into modelling.

== Career ==
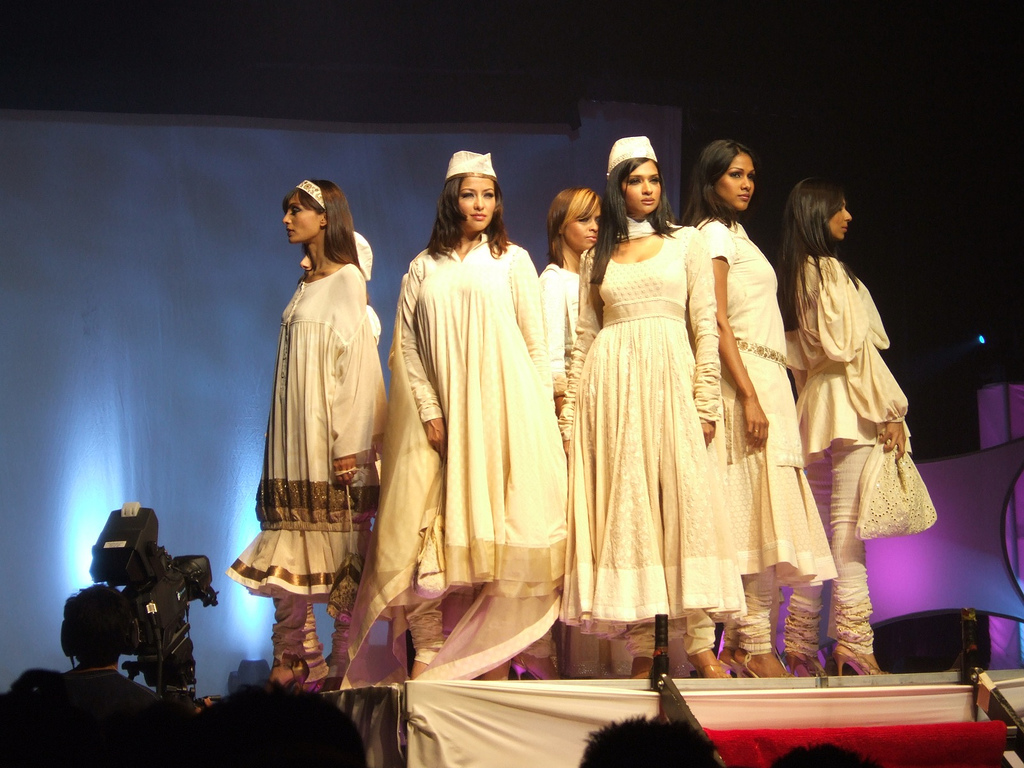
Aditi Govitrikar at Bollywood Fashion Awards, 2006.

She started her career as a model after winning the Gladrags Megamodel Contest in 1996. She also won the best body and best face prizes at the Asian Super Model Contest in 1997. She modelled for companies such as Kaya Skin Clinic, Pond's and appeared in TV commercials, including her immensely popular Coca-Cola ad with Hrithik Roshan.

Since winning Mrs. World 2001, Govitrikar continued modelling and also appeared in minor roles in a number of Bollywood and South Indian films. She has acted in the Hindi TV serial Ye Meri Life Hai and participated in reality television series such Fear Factor - Khatron Ke Khiladi (2008), hosted by Akshay Kumar, and in the reality television series, Bigg Boss (Season 3) (2009).

== Personal life ==
Despite early parental opposition, she married a Dawoodi Bohra Muslim medical school senior, Muffazal Lakdawala, whom she met while still in college and dated for over 7 years. The couple married in 1998 under both civil and Muslim law and she took the name Sarah Lakdawala. They have a daughter Kiara, who was born in 1999. The couple had another baby in May 2007. She is divorced from Muffazal Lakdawala.

Govitrikar has a younger sister, Arzoo Govitrikar, who is an electronics engineer-turned-actress. She was a judge on the show Kalakarz.

== Filmography ==
=== Films ===
| Year | Film | Role | Language | Notes | Ref |
|---|---|---|---|---|---|
| 1999 | Thammudu | Lovely | Telugu | | |
| 2002 | Mounamelanoyi | — | Telugu | special appearance in the song "Dancheti Ammalakkalalo" | |
| 2002 | Soch | Mrs. Madhulika Raj Matthews | Hindi | | |
| 2002 | 16 December | Sonal Joshi | Hindi | | |
| 2003 | Baaz: A Bird in Danger | Winner of the Beauty Contest | Hindi | | |
| 2003 | Dhund: The Fog | Simran Malhotra | Hindi | | |
| 2003 | Lankesh Patrike | — | Kannada | special appearance in the song "Sweetu Rasagolla" | |
| 2005 | Paheli | Kamli | Hindi | | |
| 2006 | Manoranjan: The Entertainment | Maya / Salma | Hindi | | |
| 2007 | Victoria No. 203 | Babyji | Hindi | | |
| 2007 | Kaisay Kahein... | Neha Saral | Hindi | | |
| 2009 | De Dana Dan | Pammi Chaddha | Hindi | | |
| 2010 | Ringa Ringa | Dream Girl | Marathi | | |
| 2011 | Bheja Fry 2 | Raveena Kapoor | Hindi | | |
| 2011 | Hum Tum Shabana | Judge | Hindi | | |
| 2014 | Myself Ghaint | Aditi (Maasi) | Hindi | | |
| 2017 | Who Is The First Wife Of My Father | Swati | Hindi | | |
| 2019 | Smile Please | Dr. Aditi | Marathi | | |
| 2021 | Koi Jaane Na | Suhana's mother | Hindi | | |

=== Music Videos ===
- Baarish Ho Rahi Hai (By Anu Malik)
- Kabhi To Nazar Milao (By Adnan Sami)

=== Television ===
| Year | Name | Role | Ref |
|---|---|---|---|
| 2003 | Aktion Unlimited ... Josh | Herself | |
| 2004 | Kkehna Hai Kuch Mujhko | Anuja | |
| 2005 | Ye Meri Life Hai | Aditi | |
| 2006 | Kalakarz | Judge | |
| 2008 | Fear Factor: Khatron Ke Khiladi 1 | (Contestant) (2nd runner up ) | |
| 2009 | Bigg Boss Hindi (Season 3) | (Contestant) Semi finalist (Evicted on Day 76) | |
| 2013 | Welcome – Baazi Mehmaan Nawazi Ki | | |
| 2014 | Arjun | Mohini | |
| 2015 | Badi Doooor Se Aaye Hai | Vidya Mandodre | |
| 2015 | Suryaputra Karn | Ganga | |
| 2019 | Parchhayee | Rosie | |
| 2020 | Mother's Care | Host | |
| 2022 | Escaype Live | Meenal Bhalla | |
| 2022 | Mismatched | Kalpana | |
| 2024 | Backroad hustle | | |
| 2024 | Life Hill Gayi | Smriti | |

== Awards and nominations ==
| Year | Award | Category | Result | Location | Ref |
|---|---|---|---|---|---|
| 1996 | Gladrags Manhunt and Megamodel Contest | Model of the Year | Winner | Mumbai, India | |
| 1996 | Carrie's Asian Supermodel Contest | Classic Face Best Body | Winner | Singapore | |
| 2000 | Gladrags Mrs. India | Mrs. India | Winner | Mumbai, India | |
| 2001 | Mrs. World | Mrs. World | Winner | Las Vegas, Nevada, United States | |
| 2001 | Rajeev Gandhi Award | National Personality of the Year | Winner | Mumbai, India | |
| 2001 | Maharashtra Ratna | State Personality of the Year | Winner | Mumbai, India | |
| 2008 | Vegetarian Congress Award | Vegetarian Celebrity | Winner | Mumbai, India | |
