= Do Lafzon Ki Kahani =

Do Lafzon Ki Kahani (lit. 'A Tale of Two Words' in Hindi-Urdu) may refer to:

- Do Lafzon Ki Kahani (TV series), a 2001 Indian TV drama that aired on Sahara TV
- Do Lafzon Ki Kahani (film), a 2016 Indian Hindi-language romantic drama film by Deepak Tijori
- "Do Lafzon Ki Hai Dil Ki Kahani" or "Amore Mio", a song by R. D. Burman, Asha Bhosle and Sharad Kumar Bader from the 1979 Indian film The Great Gambler
