= ISKCON Temple, Bengaluru =

Radha Krishna Temple in Bengaluru, India

Coordinates: 13.00981°N 77.55109°E

ISKCON Temple Bengaluru
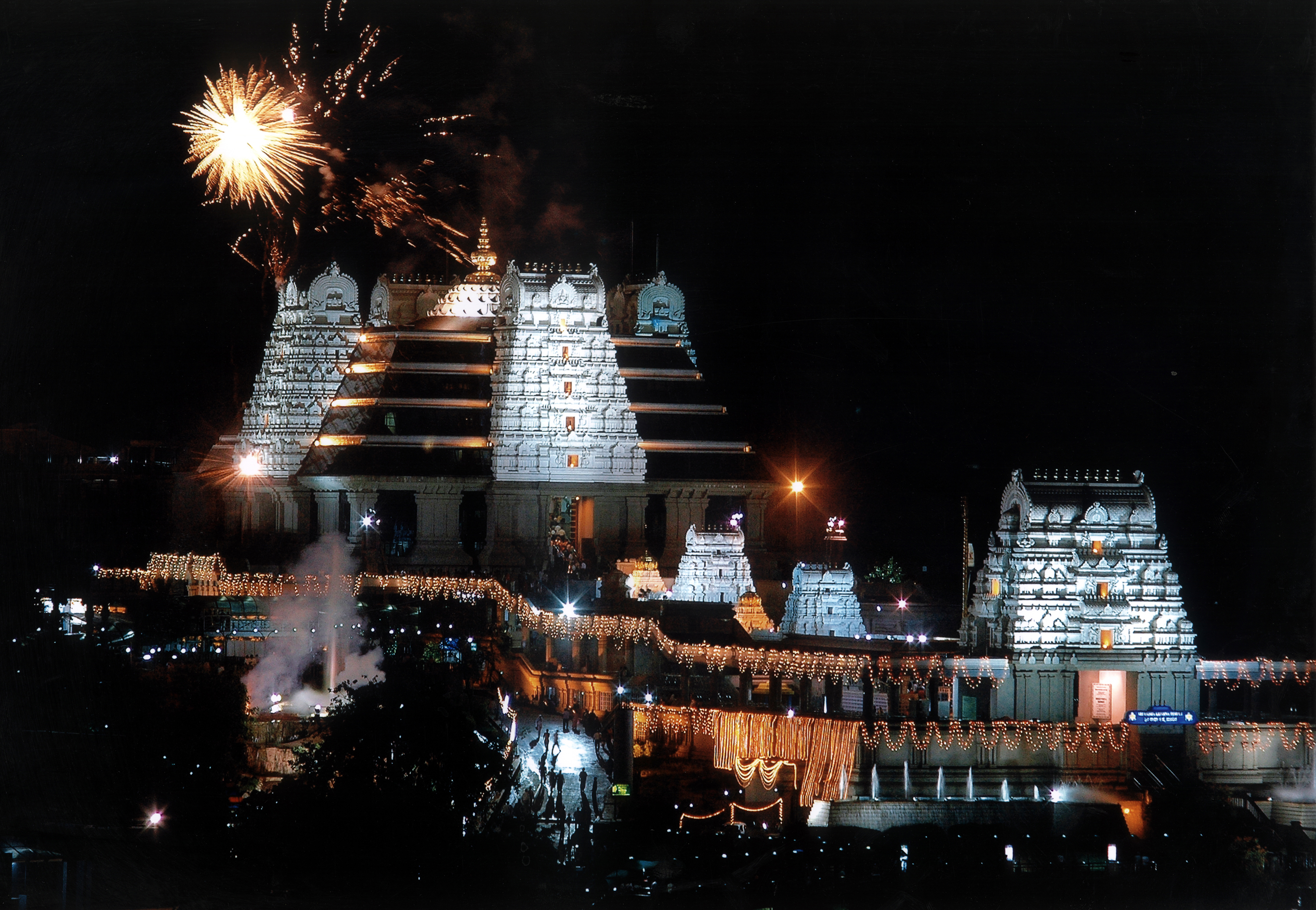
- The temple at night

Religion
- Affiliation: Hinduism
- District: Bengaluru
- Deity: Radha Krishnachandra
- Festivals: Janamashtami, Radhashtami, Gaura Purnima

Location
- Location: Rajajinagar
- State: Karnataka
- Country: India
- Interactive map of ISKCON Temple Bengaluru

Architecture
- Type: Hindu temple architecture
- Completed: 1997; 29 years ago
- Temple: 3

Website
- www.iskconbangalore.org

ISKCON Temple Bengaluru is one of the largest Krishna-Hindu temples in the world. It is situated in Bengaluru in the Indian state of Karnataka. The temple is dedicated to Hindu deities Radha Krishna and propagates monotheism as mentioned in Chandogya Upanishad.

== History ==
In May 1997, Bangalore ISKCON Temple was inaugurated by the ninth president of India, Shankar Dayal Sharma.

== Founder ==
Srila Prabhupada founded International Society for Krishna Consciousness (ISKCON). In 1966, he established ISKCON in New York City, dedicating his life to promoting the teachings of the Bhagavad Gita and the practice of bhakti yoga. His efforts established temples, ashrams, and communities worldwide, making Vedic wisdom accessible to a global audience.

During the Maha Kumbh Mela, one of the largest spiritual gatherings in the world, Srila Prabhupada was posthumously honoured with the title of "Vishwa Guru" by the Akhil Bharatiya Akhara Parishad. This recognition celebrated his monumental contributions to spirituality, his role in reviving ancient Vedic traditions, and his impact as a global spiritual ambassador.

== About Temple ==
=== Features of the temple ===
There is a gold-plated dhwaja-stambha (flag post) 17 m (56 ft) high and a gold plated kalash shikhara 8.5 m (28 ft) high. There is free distribution of Sri Krishna prasadam to all visitors during the darshana hours.

=== Shrines (altars) ===
ISKCON Bangalore has six shrines:

1. Main deities is of Radha-Krishna
2. Krishna Balrama
3. Nitai Gauranga (Chaitanya Mahaprabhu and Nityananda)
4. Srinivasa Govinda (also known as Venkateswara)
5. Prahlada Narasimha
6. Srila Prabhupada

== Social services ==
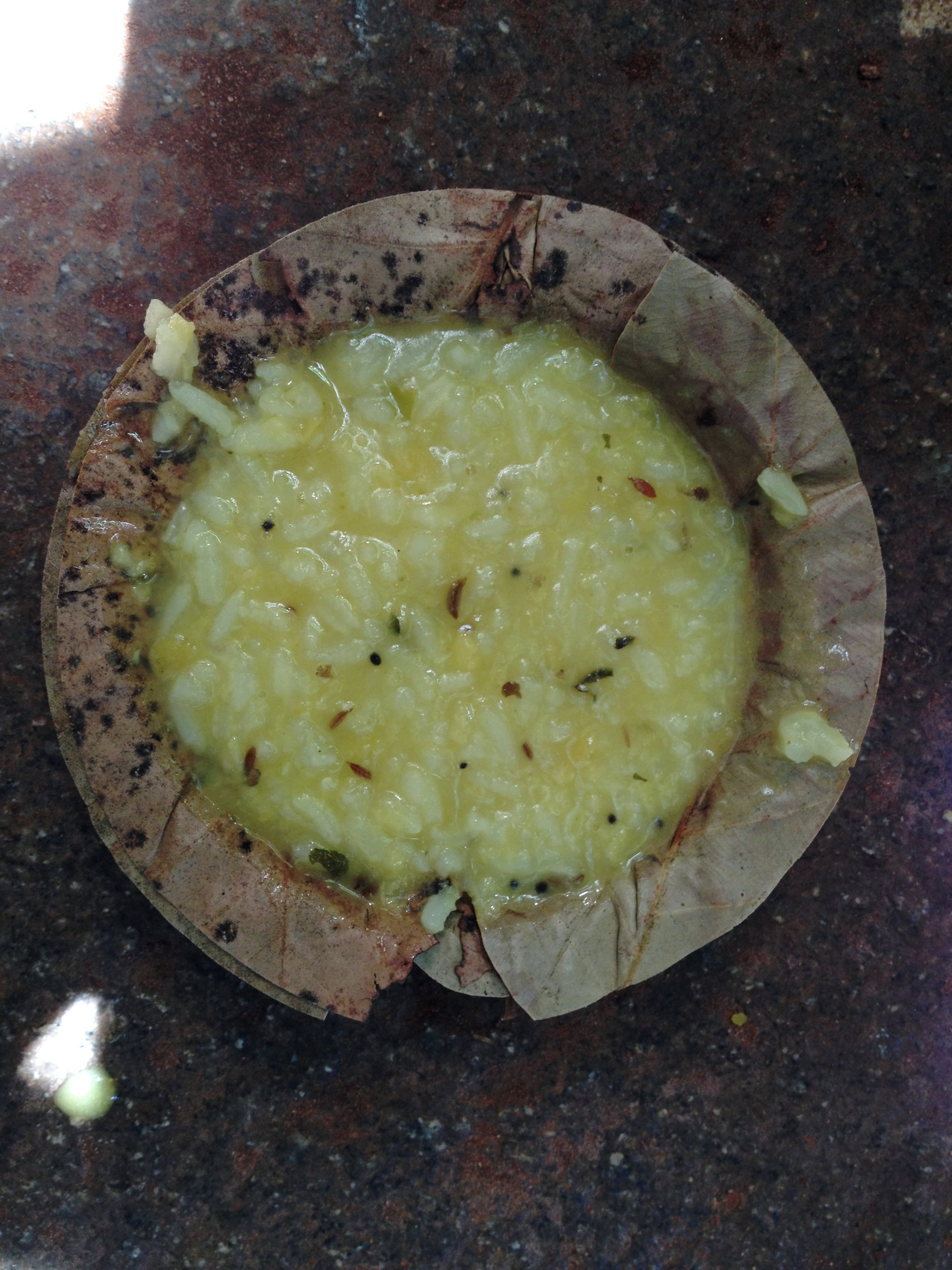
Khichdi prasāda in ecofriendly Areca-leaf traditional Indian Droṇa at ISKCON Temple Bangalore.

ISKCON Bangalore provides free food to those in need. The Akshaya Patra Foundation is one initiative started by members of the temple, which has received praise from United States' former President Barack Obama for feeding and educating children across India.

== Cultural and educational programs for children ==
ISKCON Bangalore organized a children's competition during the Krishna Janmashtami festival. One of the highlights is a Krishna costume contest, where young participants dress as Lord Krishna and Radha. The temple also hosts other youth-focused events such as drawing, storytelling, and devotional music competitions as part of its festival outreach.

== Gallery ==
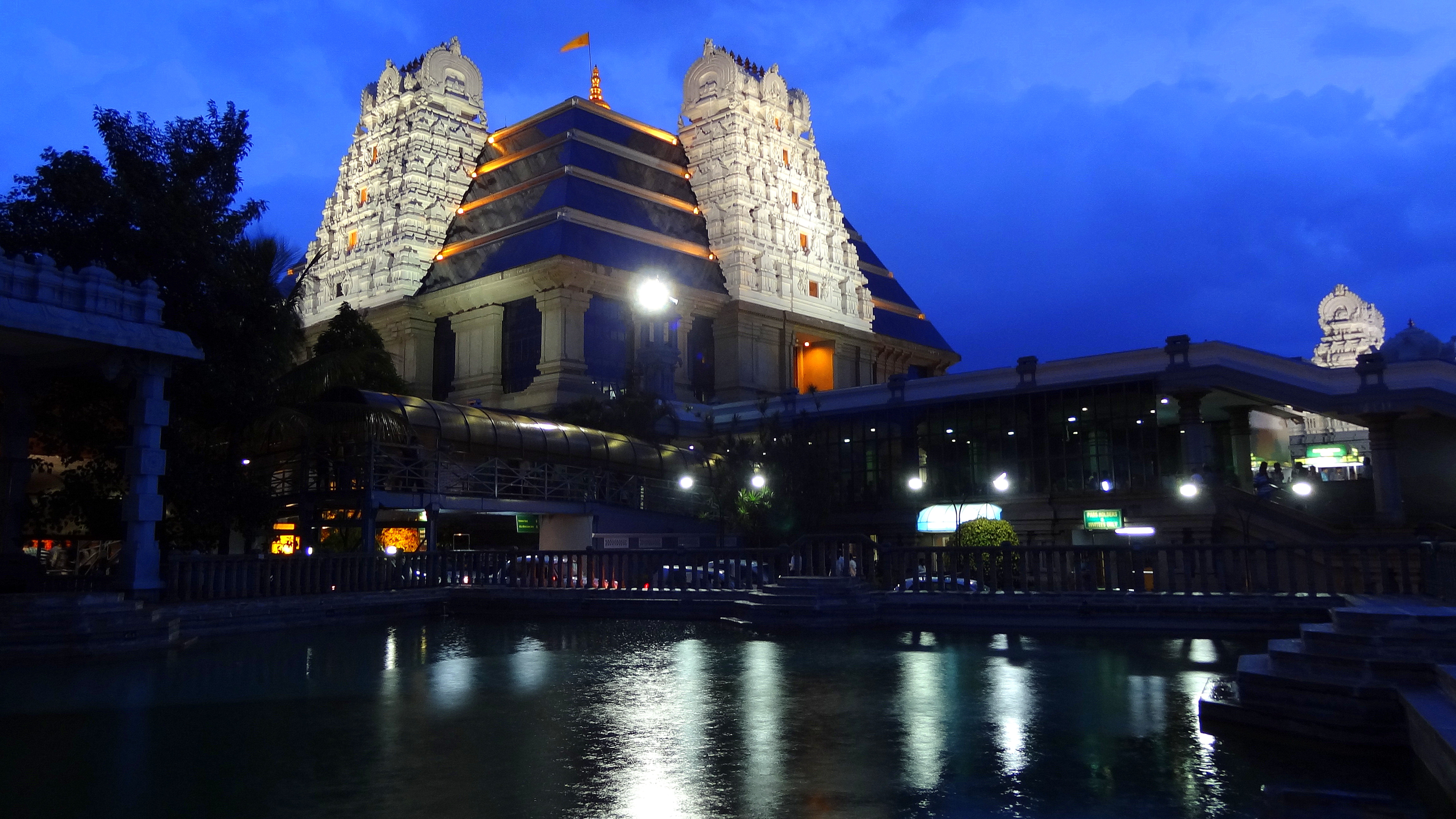
ISKCON Bangalore Temple at night

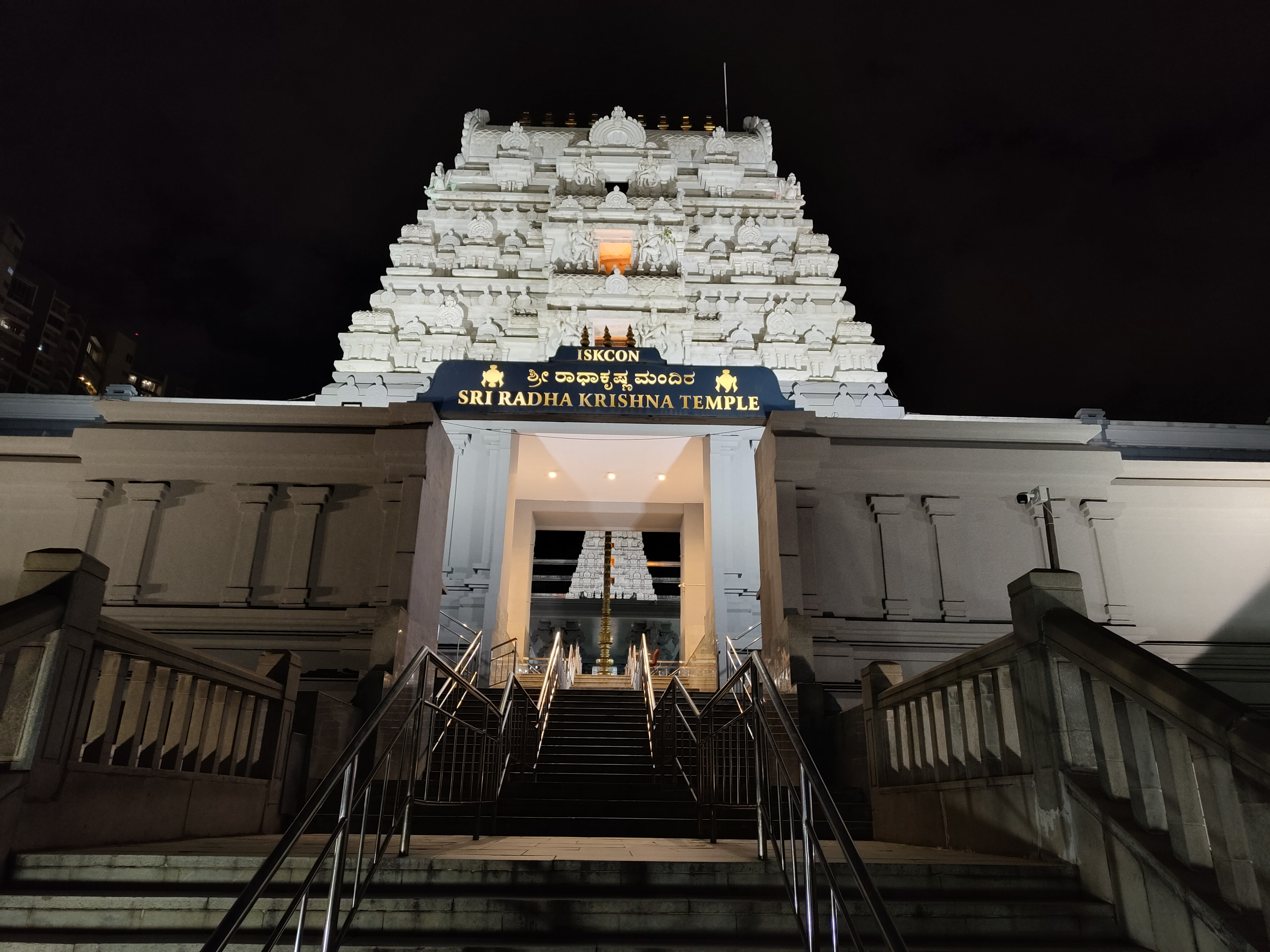
Entrance of ISKCON temple at night

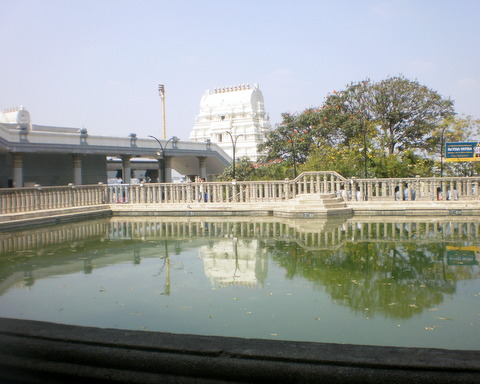
Pond near the Temple campus

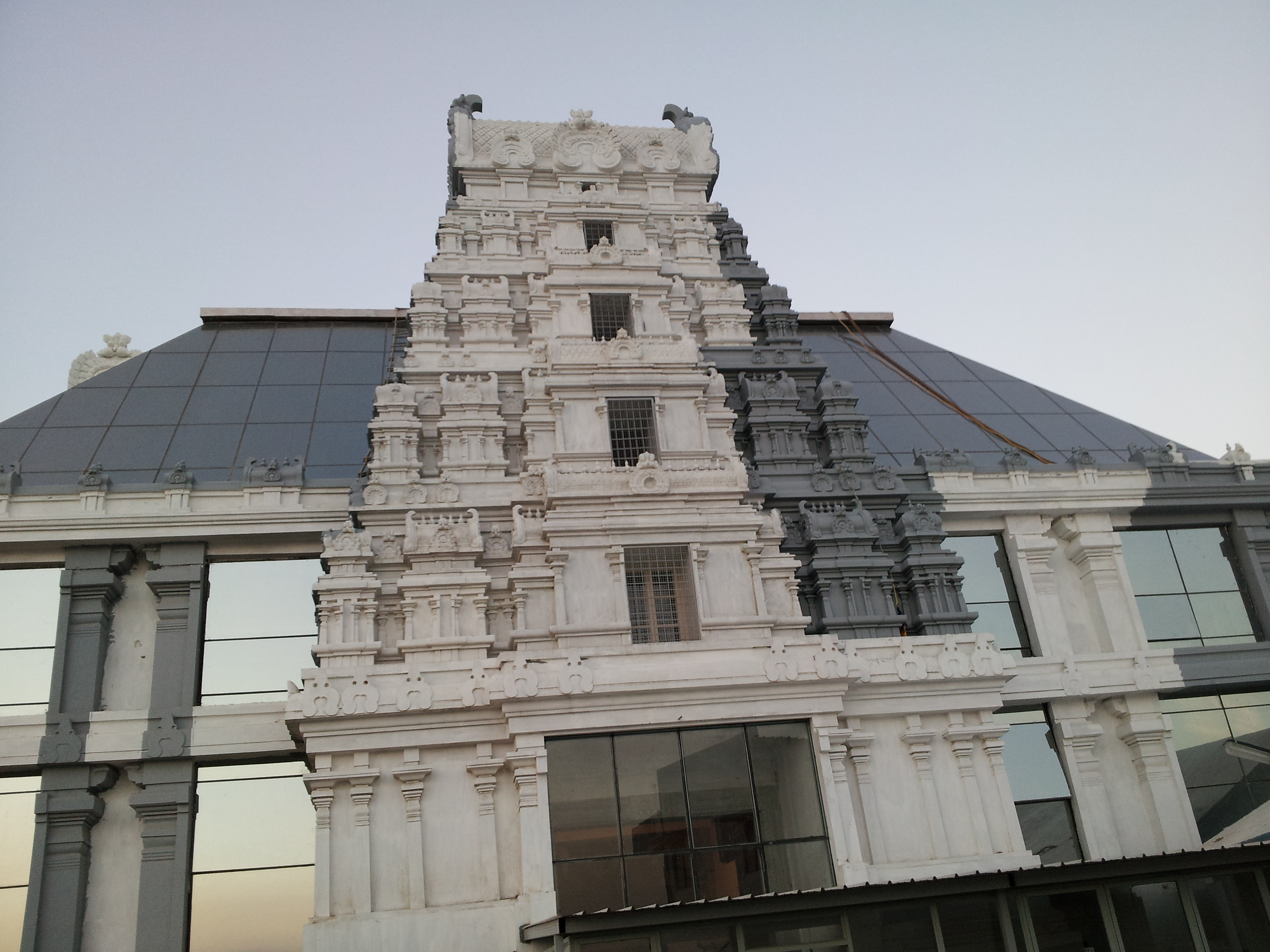
ISKCON Vaikunta Hill, Kanakpura Road
