= Dr. Madhumati On Duty =

- Created by: Vipul D. Shah
- Written by: Vipul D. Shah
- Starring: See below
- Country of origin: India
- Original language: Hindi
- No. of seasons: 2
- No. of episodes: 94

Production
- Producer: Vipul D. Shah
- Production locations: Mumbai, India
- Camera setup: Multi-camera
- Running time: 22 minutes approx.
- Production company: Optimystix Entertainment

Original release
- Network: SAB TV
- Release: 7 June – 14 October 2016

Dr. Madhumati On Duty (formerly Dr. Bhanumati On Duty) is an Indian Hindi hospital based drama television series, which was premiered on 1 August 2016 and broadcast on Sony SAB. The series was produced by Optimystix Entertainment owned by Vipul D Shah and it is aired on weekdays. The show was the second season of its previous show Dr. Bhanumati On Duty. The show was re launched as Kavita Kaushik announced on social media that she will be leaving the show, the show went off air. From 1 August, the show was relaunched as Dr. Madhumati On Duty. Kaushik left the show due to her character not developing, and the show being very similar to her previous show, F.I.R., and most dialogues were copied. She got replaced by Debina Bonnerjee.

The re-launched show was introduced with a love angle, as Madhumati serves as Mohan's love interest. The Dean of the hospital was introduced. Unlike Bhanumati (who used drama), Madhumati is strict and cures patients in stereotypical doctor way, while Mohan tries to cure them with laughter and emotions.

== Series overview ==
| Season | Title | No. of episodes | Originally broadcast (India) | |
| Season | Title | No. of episodes | First aired | Last aired |
|---|---|---|---|---|
| 1 | Dr. Bhanumati On Duty | 39 | 7 June 2016 | 29 July 2016 |
| 2 | Dr. Madhumati On Duty | 55 | 1 August 2016 | 14 October 2016 |

== Cast ==
- Kavita Kaushik as Dr. Bhanumati
- Debina Bonnerjee as Dr. Madhumati
- Vipul Roy as Dr. Mohan
- Anang Desai as Dean
- Gopi Bhalla as Lovely Singh Dhingra
- Manju Sharma
- Oindrila Sahaq
- Ketan Singh as Doodhnath
- Tapasya Nayak Srivastava as Sonia Jr. Doctor
- Prajakta Dusane as Sharmili
- Rahul Singh as Bhola
- Rahul Sharma
- Urmila tiwari as Dr.Priya, Dr.Mohan and Dr.Madhumati's friend
- Reshmi Ghosh as Chanda Chauhan
- Monica Castelino
- Smita Singh
- Shakeel Siddiqui
- Shiv Panditt as Inspector Makkhan Singh/ Shiv
- Jhumma Mitra as Dr Madhumati's Mausi

== Broadcast ==
Dr. Bhanumati On Duty premiered on 7 June 2016. Kavita Kaushik played the lead role at the start of the first series. She played a doctor who is known for her unique style in curing her patients.

As Kaushik announced on social media that she would be leaving the show, the show went off air. Kaushik left the show due to her character not developing, and the show being very similar to her previous show, F.I.R., and most dialogues were copied.
