= Krishna Arjun (TV series) =

- Also known as: Krishna Sharma C.A.
- Genre: Drama; Police Procedural
- Created by: Abhimanyu Singh
- Directed by: Vijay Krishna Acharya
- Country of origin: India
- Original language: Hindi

Production
- Production companies: Cinevistaas Limited; Contiloe Entertainment

Original release
- Network: STAR Plus
- Release: 18 March 2002 – 2004

Krishna Arjun is a detective show produced by Cinevistaas Limited and Contiloe Entertainment. The show aired on StarPlus and starred Shraddha Nigam and Hussain Kuwajerwala.

A pair of young detectives based in Mumbai take on cases that range from murder mysteries, kidnappings, thefts, and missing cases to fraud.

== Plot ==
Krishna and Arjun, a pair of detectives based in Mumbai take on cases that range from murder mysteries, kidnappings, thefts, and missing cases to fraud. In their early twenties, this duo has had many successful cases solved to their credit. Though they are based in Mumbai, their reputation has taken them to different parts of the country and even abroad.

Krishna is a modern young girl based in Mumbai. She is a busybee. She always has an unfulfilled 'To-Do' list and never has the time or the inclination to look at any guy. She always looks forward to challenges and has an analytical bent of mind. Charged with the desire to put a wrong right, she is a young dynamic girl with a vision. Krishna is the brain behind the outfit. She collects little pieces of the puzzle in her photographic memory and deduces the answer of the entire puzzle in the end. She is not vain about her looks and though does not spend hours in front of the mirror, it is hard to ignore Krishna with her vivacious and bubbly looks coupled with a razor sharp brain. Arjun Complementing Krishna's sharp analytical skills is Arjun with practical skills that can get them out of any sticky situation. Ironically though, one word that would describe his disposition, is lazy. He is not interested in doing any work at all, his dream is to laze on the beach for hours together, gawking at gorgeous girls. He is a harmless flirt, who actually steps back if any girl reciprocates to his harmless advances. Unknown to him, the only girl he is most comfortable with is Krishna. He loves to play practical jokes on everybody around him especially Krishna. Arjun is fashion conscious experimenting with new clothes and accessories.

== Cast ==
=== Main ===
- Shraddha Nigam as Krishna
- Hussain Kuwajerwala as Arjun

=== Recurring ===
- Aanjjan Srivastav as Krishna's father
- Ravi Baswani
- Neelu Kohli
- Sandeep Mehta
- Ronit Roy
- Shweta Kawatra

== Production ==
Initially it was titled as Krishna Sharma C.A., and premiered on StarPlus on 18 March 2002 which followed is the story of Krishna Sharma played by Shraddha Nigam who is a cartoon artist which started as a comedy and then changed as kids series. However, when it did not get good response, the series undergone many changes including the script as a detective drama with the series being retitled Krishna Arjun with Nigam reprising her role with a new addition of Hussain Kuwajerwala as Arjun during July 2002, which was based on American drama Remington Steele.

== Reception ==
The Tribune quoted the series as fast-paced and stylised.
