= Sajan Re Phir Jhooth Mat Bolo =

Indian sitcom series

- Genre: Comedy
- Written by: Vipul D. Shah; Hemant Kevani; Amit Senchoudhary
- Starring: Hussain Kuwajerwala; Parvati Vaze; Tiku Talsania; Sharad Ponkshe
- Opening theme: Sajan Re Phir Jhoot Mat Bolo
- Country of origin: India
- Original language: Hindi
- No. of seasons: 1
- No. of episodes: 340

Production
- Producers: Vipul D Shah; Sanjiv Sharma
- Editor: Ved Satpathy
- Camera setup: Multiple Cameras
- Running time: 21 minutes
- Production company: Optimystix Entertainment

Original release
- Network: SAB TV
- Release: 23 May 2017 – 14 September 2018

Related
- Sajan Re Jhoot Mat Bolo

Sajan Re Phir Jhoot Mat Bolo (transl. Honey do not lie again) is an Indian television sitcom that was broadcast on Sony SAB from 23 May 2017 to 14 September 2018. It is the sequel to Sajan Re Jhoot Mat Bolo, and stars Hussain Kuwajerwala, Parvati Vaze, Tiku Talsania, and Sharad Ponkshe.

== Plot ==
Jaiveer Chopra is a wealthy man who falls in love with a girl named Jaya Lokhande in college. He lies to her and says that he is poor. After college, both go to their parents. Jai has a welcome party for Jaya. Meanwhile, at Jaya's house, Jai learns that her father, Lalit Rao Lokhande abhors the rich. He devises a ruse to pretend to be poor and convinces others to pretend to be his family. Jai constructs a fake poor house beside his mansion with different doors to enter from one house to another.

Jai's married life is frequently troubled by Sudhakar and Jaya's attempts to get a job in Jai's company as a doctor. Jaya spies on Jai after she overhears a conversation between Jai and Kangana Kalia about hiding the family's rich secrets in front of Lokhande and Jaya. Jaya disguises herself as a maid in the Chopra mansion and learns about Jai's wealth, but Jai exposes her. Jaya slips on the stairs, and loses part of her memory, remembering only the events up to the year 2012.

Lokhande brings her back to Jai's house and lies to Jaya, saying that she is still in the year 2012. Jaya begins to develop feelings towards Jai but still feels he is not the right choice for her. Although she loved jay in 2017, but she refuses and hates Jai in 2012 as she has no connection with Jai. Although Jai tries to please her like before, Jaya is still unwilling to marry Jai because she doubts him and his family. Every time she doubts, she fails and Jai and his family silently bear just that Jaya doesn't get any sort of trouble. Jai and his family silently bears whatever Jaya does and Jay tries his best not to hurt her in any cost. When Jaya agrees to marry Jaiveer, the plan flops as Gyanchand/Deepak mistakenly sets the wedding date in 2018.

The plot moves forward with Jai and Jaya sharing a few romantic moments, but Lokhande learns that Jai and his family are rich. Jai finds out that the real Lokhande has been kidnapped, and the plotter who discovered the truth is an imposter. Meanwhile, Lokhande suffers from a sleep-related condition that the Chopras assume him to be dead.

Jaya finds out that Jai is lying with Deepak, and she tries to call the police and get Jai arrested. Lokhande, unable to tolerate Jaya's rudeness and arrogance towards Jai, gets infuriated and confesses that Jai is her husband and she is suffering from Partial memory loss.

In an attempt to revive her memory, Jai decorates his room with all the precious moments of their journey of love and marriage. Jaya apologises to Jai, and he forgives her.

== Cast ==
=== Main ===
- Hussain Kuwajerwala as Jaiveer 'Jay' Chopra who is a wealthy man but pretends to be poor in front of Jaya.
- Parvati Vaze as Jaya Jay Chopra / Jaya Lalitrao Lokhande who is a poor girl but has fallen with wealthy Jay.
- Sharad Ponkshe as Lalit Rao Lokhande, Amrita’s husband Jaya's strict father and Jay's strict father-in-law.
- Tiku Talsania as Paramveer Chopra "PC"/Premchand Chopra. Jay's father and innocent by nature and rich by wealth.

=== Recurring ===
- Rakhi Vijan as Monica Malpani. Jay's fake mother and PC's best friend.
- Gaurav Dubey as Deepak Tijori/Gyanchand Mahabapu. Jay's Best Friend.
- Urmila Tiwari as Urmila Bhide/Urmila Chopra Jay's fake sister but Jay treats her as her own real sister.
- Priya Raina as Kangana Kalia. Vodka Queen and Jay's fake DhaiMaa
- Amish Tanna as Sudhakar Panshikar. Lokhande's Assistant
- Sonal Bhatt as Sushma Lalit Rao. Deepak"s love interest and crush.
- Shruti Rawat as Jimnaak Jhimkari aka Jingalala. Sudhakar innocent wife and she keeps speaking something which nobody can understand (Junglee language)
- Lavleen Raizada as Maria. A beautiful chef of PC
- Deepali Saini as Sajni. Deepak's GirlFriend
- Vrajesh Hirjee as Drama Director
- Purvesh Pimple as Tatya
- Dipika Kakar as an actress herself (Episodic appearance)
- Dushyant Wagh as Triyambak
- Sharat Saxena as Kulguru Trikaldarshi
- V.I.P. as Kabila King
- Dheeraj Miglani as Sadashiv
- Anamika Singh as Pinky
- Deepak Pareek as Commissioner Mugal Mukherjee
- Prasad Barve as Inspector Karan
- Kushal Punjabi as Kundan Panwar
- Nitin Vakharia as Chandan Panwar (Kundan's father)
- Abhay Pratap Singh as Vijay, Jai's fake brother and a thief
- Silambarasan T R as Thillu Mullu Editor
- Gopichand as

Director

- Sampada Kulkarni as Amrita Lokhande, Lalit’s wife
- Prabhas as Producer
- Lollu Sabha Jeeva as Actor
- Alisha Tunga as Isha Malpani, Monica’s Adoptive daughter

=== Guest ===
- Jinder Mahal as himself

== Nominations ==
- Hussain Kuwajerwala – Jaiveer Chopra – Popular Star Male 2018 (nominated)
