= Soch =

2002 film

- Directed by: Sushen Bhatnagar
- Written by: Sushen Bhatnagar; Atul Tiwari
- Starring: Sanjay Kapoor; Raveena Tandon; Aditi Govitrikar; Arbaaz Khan
- Release date: 30 August 2002
- Country: India
- Language: Hindi

Soch is a 2002 Hindi language crime thriller mystery film starring Sanjay Kapoor, Raveena Tandon, Arbaaz Khan, Danny Denzongpa and Aditi Govitrikar among others. Soch is adapted from Alfred Hitchcock's 1951 film Strangers on a Train.

== Plot ==
Raj Matthews, a rich, famous, handsome, and popular actor, has been selected as the best actor in the Bollywood Cine Awards. He dedicates this award to his pretty director, Preeti Sardesai, who herself spends a lot of time thinking and dreaming about him and in fact may be in love with him. However, behind all the glitter and the glory lies an embittered wife — Madhulika — who is insecure, jealous of Preeti, and suspects her husband of having an affair with her. This suspicion has led to her becoming very insecure, to the point of belittling Raj and accusing him of the affair in a public setting.

The story takes a nasty turn when Madhulika is suddenly killed and the police immediately suspect Raj. Raj, meanwhile, eventually runs into an unnamed man, who not only admits to the killing but asks Raj to return the favor by killing this man's dad, whom he claims is abusive; the man claims this is part of an agreement they had made previously. Raj denies this but quickly finds himself opposed by both this man, who continues to pressure him to perform the deadly act, and the cops, who remain unconvinced about this unnamed man.

What will Raj do when he is forced into a corner, especially when Preeti's life is at stake?

== Cast ==
- Sanjay Kapoor as Raj Matthews, Madhulika's husband.
- Raveena Tandon as Preeti Sardesai
- Aditi Govitrikar as Madhulika Matthews, Raj's wife.
- Arbaaz Khan as Om, Nautiyal's son.
- Danny Denzongpa as Nautiyal, Om's father.
- Tiku Talsania as Lovely Shankar
- Mushtaq Khan as Film Director
- Anjala Zaveri as special appearance in song "Dil Dhoonde"
- Dadhi Pandey as Secretary to Lovely Shankar

== Soundtrack ==
Soch

Soundtrack album by Jatin–Lalit
- Released: 2002
- Genre: Feature film soundtrack
- Label: Universal Music India

Song	Singer
"Tohe Leke"	Sonu Nigam, Richa Sharma
"Yaadein Bani"	Kumar Sanu, Alka Yagnik
"Aa Mere Sanam"	Alka Yagnik
"Hasata Hai Rulata Hai"	Shraddha Pandit, Shweta Pandit
"Dil Dhoonde"	KK, Asha Bhosle
