= Shree (film) =

- Official Poster
- Directed by: Rajesh Bachchani
- Written by: Rajesh Bachchani
- Produced by: Vikram M. Shah
- Starring: Hussain Kuwajerwala; Paresh Ganatra; Anjali Patil; Shivani Tanskale
- Cinematography: Subhransu Das
- Edited by: Noor Memon
- Music by: Talaash Band-The Band of Seekers; Claver Menezes
- Release date: 26 April 2013
- Country: India
- Language: Hindi

Shree (transl. Mister) is a 2013 Indian Hindi-language science fiction thriller film directed by Rajesh Bachchani and produced by Vikram M. Shah. It stars Hussain Kuwajerwala. The film was released in India on 26 April 2013.

== Cast ==
- Hussain Kuwajerwala as Shree, an ordinary man
- Paresh Ganatra as Inspector Ganpath
- Anjali Patil as Sonu (Shree's love interest Anjuum)
- K C Shankar as Tilak
- Shivani Tanksale as Sheena
- Rio Kapadiya as Jairaj
- Raj Arjun as Krishna Kant Desai

== Critical reception ==
The Times of India rated the film 3/5, writing "Songs take the film forward instead of simply adding to its length. Overall, Shree is a well-scripted thriller. Go for it." BollywoodMDB rated the film 3/5, writing that "With a great, unique and new story, Shree has huge potential to become attention-seeker among the audience. Though at a low level as compared to Hollywood Sci-Fi flicks, Shree makes a place for itself in the world of off-beat movies. In a nutshell, the film is definitely worth a watch." Martin D' Souza from Glamsham rated the film 3/5, writing "Nevertheless, if only for the first half, this film is worth a watch."

== Box office ==
The film was made on a budget of ₹1,25,00,000 and was released on 100 screens. The film was a failure at the Box Office.
