= Manjula Anagani =

Indian gynecologist

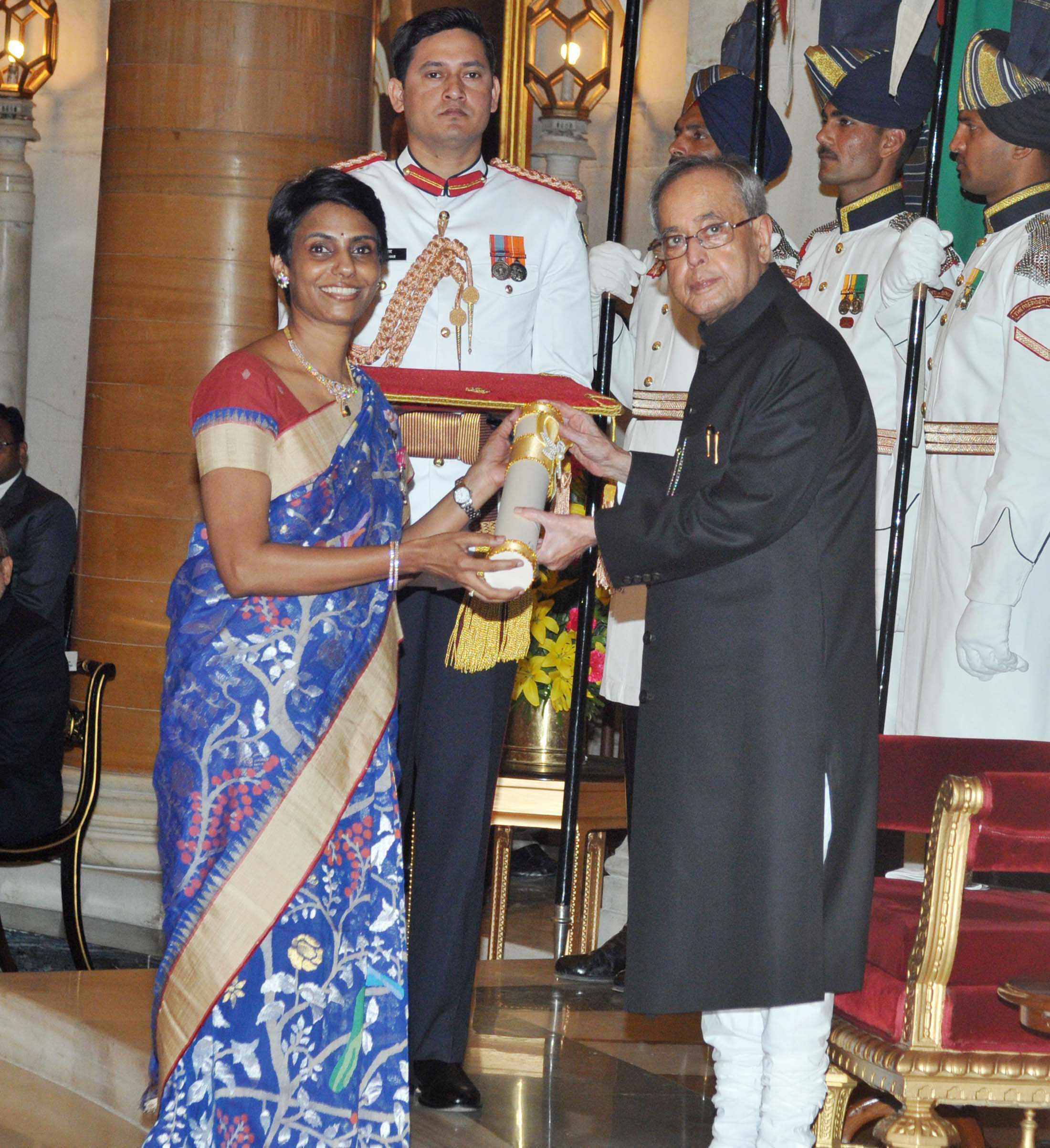
- Anagani (left) receiving Padma Shri award from President Pranab Mukherjee, 2015
- Born: Telangana, India
- Occupation: Gynecologist
- Awards: Padma Shri
- Website: drmanjula.in

Manjula Anagani is an Indian obstetrician and gynaecologist.

== Early life and education ==
Manjula Anagani was born in Telangana, India as a second child with three siblings. She was ranked 58th in the Engineering Agricultural and Medical Common Entrance Test and later joined Gandhi Medical College. She was a recipient of the Chief Minister’s scholarship for academic excellence in tenth grade. She graduated with a Doctor of Medicine from Osmania Medical College in Hyderabad.

Later, she underwent higher training in prenatal genetic evaluation, infertility, ultrasonography and minimally invasive procedures such as hysteroscopy and laparoscopy.

== Career ==
According to The Hindu, Anagani has pioneered new laparoscopic techniques and contributed work on primary amenorrhoea, stem cell procedures for endometrial regeneration, and a technique of creating a neovagina.

In 2015, she was awarded the Padma Shri, the fourth highest Indian civilian award, by the Government of India. In 2016, Anagani also received an Indian Affairs Indian of the Year award at the 2016 India Leadership Conclave in Mumbai. That same year, she also was recognised by the Guinness World Records for removing the largest number of uterine fibroids in a single operation. She and her team removed 84 fibroids weighing 4 kilograms in total with the largest weighing 1.07 kg, operating through a minimally-invasive low transverse mini-laparotomy incision.

Anagani has also co-founded a non-governmental organization named Pratyusha to campaign for women's health. She is doing lot for the women empowerment, On February 8, 2020 she was guest speaker and participated in SHE Safe Walk, Kudos to her initiations she was an inspiration to the rest of the world

== Personal life ==
Anagani is married to Kolli Suresh.
