= Urmila Tiwari =

Indian stage and television actress

- Born: Mumbai, India
- Occupation: Actress
- Known for: Hum Ladkiyan; Sajan Re Phir Jhoot Mat Bolo; Maddam Sir

Urmila Tiwari is an Indian stage and television actress.

== Career ==
She started her acting career from the age of 14 and was associated with Panorama Art Theatre and has done many shows in Prithvi and NCPA theaters till her first appearance on TV as an anchor for a game show channel Play TV.

Her work includes playing as the lead role in the TV serials like Hum Ladkiyan as Ajju. She was also part of 2025 Jaane Kya Hoga Aage as Neetika Joshi. She played the role of Dr. Priya in the show Dr. Madhumati on Duty and Pyaar Ka Dard Hai Meetha Meetha Pyaara Pyaara as Neha. She also worked in a comedy TV Serial aired on SAB TV Channel called Sajan Re Phir Jhoot Mat Bolo, where she played the role of Urmila. She also worked in Maddam Sir playing various characters.

== Filmography ==
Year	Title	Role(s)	Notes	Ref.
2008-09	Hum Ladkiyan	Ajju		
2012-14	Pyar Ka Dard Hai Meetha Meetha Pyara Pyara	Neha		
2015	2025 Jane Kya Hoga Aage	Neetika Joshi		
2016	Dr. Madhumati On Duty	Dr. Priya		
2017	Sajan Re Phir Jhoot Mat Bolo	Urmila		
2020-21	Maddam Sir	Various character		
