= Mayank Anand =

Indian actor

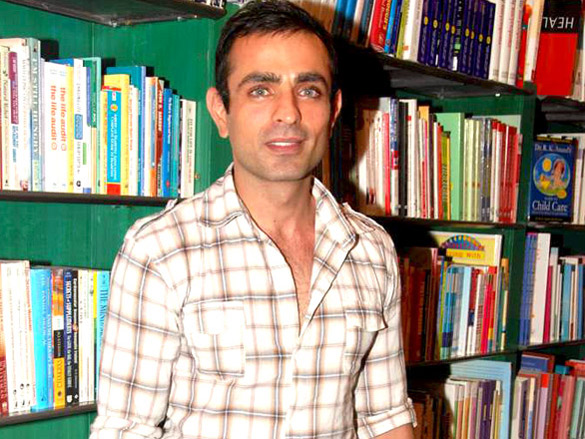
- Born: Mumbai, India
- Occupation: Actor
- Spouse: Shraddha Nigam (m. 2012)

Mayank Anand is an Indian actor.

== Career ==
Mayank's most popular role to date was Dr. Rahul Garewal in Dill Mill Gayye on STAR One opposite Drashti Dhami.

== Personal life ==
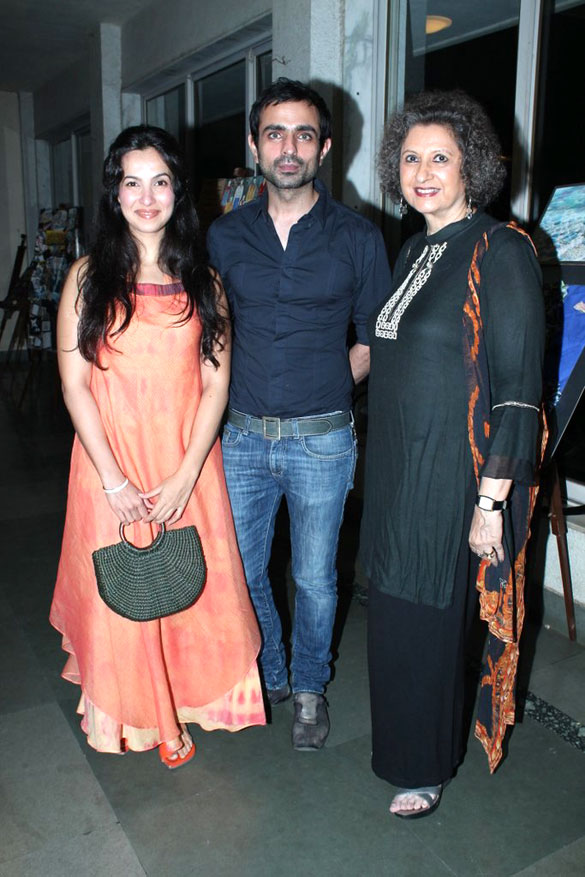
Shraddha Nigam and Mayank Anand at Shalom fashion show

He married Shraddha Nigam in December 2012. They have since launched a fashion label together at the Lakme Fashion Week.

== Television shows ==
- Dill Mill Gayye - Dr. Rahul Garewal
- Hotel Kingston - Niklesh Mehra aka Nik
- Naaginn as Vikram
- Bombay Talking on Zee Café
- Saarrthi on STAR Plus
- Hello Dollie as Nikshay Rana on STAR Plus
- Na Na Karte on Star One
- Ssshhhh...Phir Koi Hai - Bhediya as Madhukar (Episode 14)
- Ssshhhh...Phir Koi Hai - Honeymoon as Vineet (Episode 22)
- Ssshhhh...Phir Koi Hai - Bhai as Anil (Episode 30)
