= Myself Ghaint =

- Directed by: Akashdeep S Batth
- Written by: Akashdeep S Batth
- Produced by: Daljeet Singh and Gagandeep Singh. Charandeep Singh
- Starring: Gaurav Kakkar; Maninder Velly; Dolly Sidhu; Banny Chauhan
- Cinematography: Vikcee
- Edited by: Jeet Singh
- Music by: Mr. Vgrooves
- Production companies: Silver Hawk Productions in Association with KD Films and United Space Productions and Silver storm records
- Distributed by: Omjee Cine World
- Release date: 9 May 2014
- Country: India
- Language: Punjabi

Myself Ghaint is a 2014 Indian Feature film, Punjabi film directed by Akashdeep S Batth and starring Gaurav Kakkar and Maninder Velly as leads, with Dolly Sidhu on Female Lead along with Aditi Govitrikar. The music of the film is by Mr. Vgrooves.

== Cast ==
- Gaurav Kakkar as Ghaint
- Maninder Velly as Abs
- Dolly Sidhu as Simran
- Banny Chauhan as Lehri
- Aditi Govitrikar as Aditi
- Browney Prasher as Masarji
