= Shabaash India =

- A promotional logo image of "Shabaash India" featuring Hussain Kuwajerwala.
- Created by: Zee TV
- Directed by: Abhilash Bhattacharya/ Imtiaz Alam
- Starring: Hussain Kuwajerwala
- Opening theme: "Shabaash India" by Kailash Kher
- Country of origin: India
- No. of episodes: 129

Production
- Running time: approx. 22 minutes

Original release
- Network: Zee TV
- Release: July 2006 – February 2008

Shabaash India is a reality show that aired on Zee TV that showcased the record-breaking and unorthodox talents of the people of India. The shows presented different abilities of people such as physical strength, stamina, mental and paranormal that amazed TV viewers. Notable feats in the shows have been a man pulling a Boeing 737 with his hair, a lady passing 50 motor cycles over her stomach and a young man breaking 76 tube lights with his neck. The show is hosted by Hussain Kuwajerwala.

== See also ==
- OMG! Yeh Mera India
- Mano Ya Na Mano (2006 TV series)
- Mano Ya Na Mano (1995 TV series)
