= Kalakarz =

Kalakarz is a reality television series which aired on DD National in India, featuring a competition for new actors. Richa Tiwari from Sagar, Madhya Pradesh won the show who was later seen in other DD National Programs as well. The show was hosted by Shraddha Nigam and Hussain Kuwajerwala, and was judged by Amol Palekar and Deepti Naval. The show was produced by Supriya Khan.

== Candidates ==
After taking auditions from all over India, the judges shortlisted ten candidates for participation.

Richa Tiwari who won the show was later seen in many National Theaters, Short Films and Television Shows and Priyanka Mukherjee, who came in fourth place, was later seen in Indian Idol season 4.
