= Do Lafzon Ki Kahani (TV series) =

- Genre: Drama
- Directed by: Kushan Nandy
- Starring: See below
- Country of origin: India
- Original language: Hindi
- No. of seasons: 1

Production
- Executive producer: Kiran Shroff
- Producer: Kushan Nandy
- Camera setup: Multi-camera
- Running time: Approx. 24 minutes

Original release
- Network: Sahara TV
- Release: 20 June 2001

Do Lafzon Ki Kahani (transl. A tale of two words) is an Indian television series that aired on Sahara TV. The story revolves around three generations of a family: a mother, her adoptive daughter, and her granddaughter. The series premiered on 20 June 2001 and stars Bollywood film actress Helen as the mother.

== Cast ==
- Helen Jairag Richardson as Monica Stevens
- Samyukta Singh as Antara (Monica's adopted daughter)
- Aman Verma as Raj
- Jas Arora as Aryan
