= Ravi Naidu =

Australian scientist (born 1954)

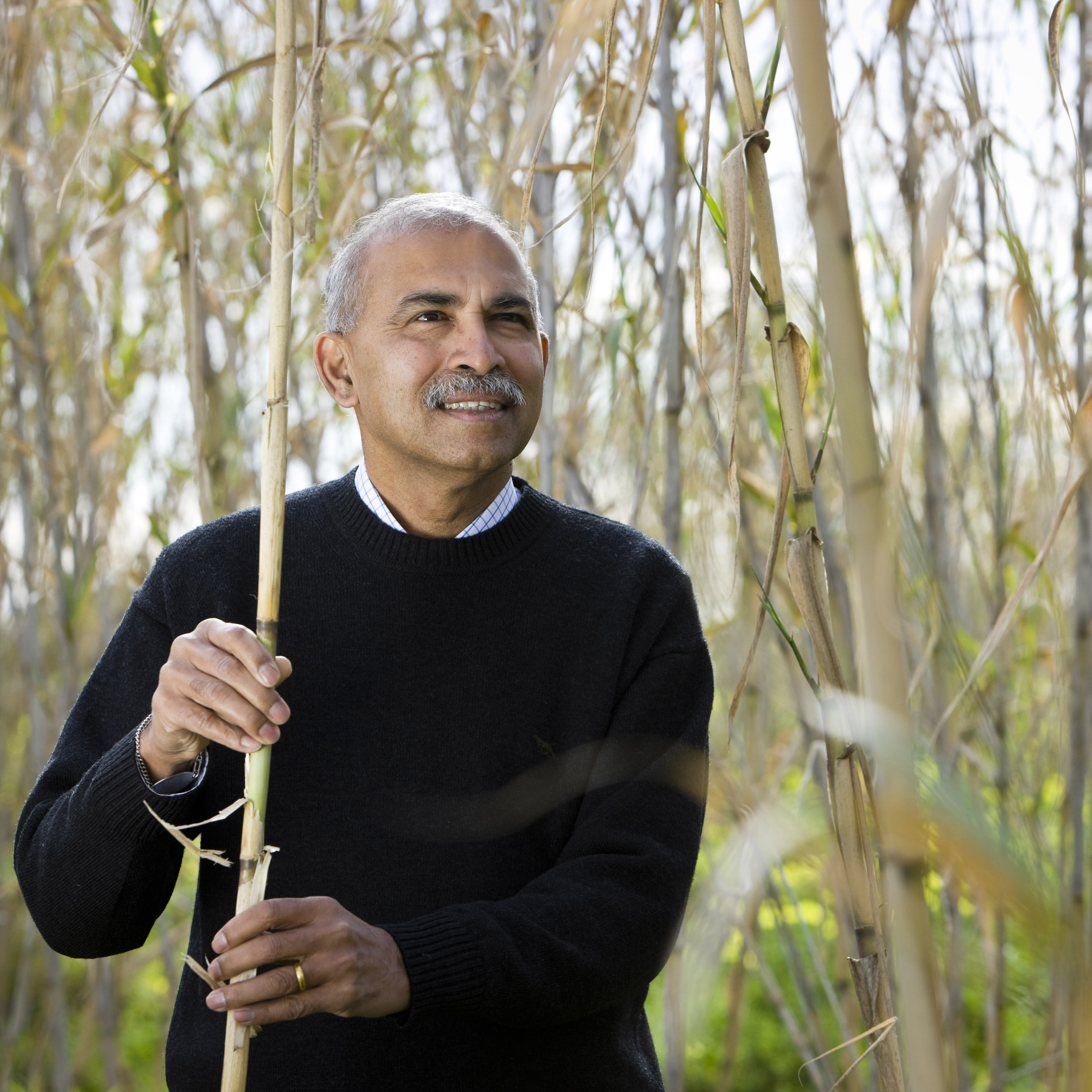
- Education: Massey University
- Awards: Glinka World Soil Prize 2023; Mahatma Gandhi Leadership award 2022
- Scientific career
- Fields: Environmental Risk and Remediation
- Website: www.newcastle.edu.au/profile/ravi-naidu; crccare.com

Ravi Naidu (also known as Ravendra Naidu; born in Nadi, Fiji) is a Fijian-Australian scientist, working in soil contamination and sustainable soil management. In 2023, he was awarded the Glinka World Soil Prize...

He is a Distinguished Laureate Professor and Director of the Global Centre for Environmental Remediation in the University of Newcastle, Australia. Apart from his academic role, he holds leadership position in the Cooperative Research Centre for the Contamination Assessment and Remediation of the Environment.

According to his publicly available biography, it appears that Ravi takes a risk-based approach to environmental remediation, in which he helped bring industry, academia and government stakeholders together to work collaboratively.

He was awarded the European Geosciences Union's Kabata-Pendias Medal in 2023, and the Mahatma Gandhi Leadership in 2022

== Education and career ==
After graduating from University of the South Pacific (USP), Fiji, in Chemistry and Mathematics, Ravi Naidu obtained his M.Sc. (Mineralogy) jointly from University of Aberdeen, UK, in 1979. His career started as a lecturer at USP. Soon after, he completed his PhD (Soil chemistry) from Massey University, New Zealand in 1986. In 2015, he obtained Doctor of Science (Soil Chemistry) degree from Massey University, following the same (Hon Causa) by the Tamil Nadu Agricultural University in 2013.

== Awards and recognition ==
- 2026: Ravi was highlighted as one of Sustainability Leaders by AsiaOne Magazine.
- 2026: Ravi Naidu has achieved the remarkable milestone of 100,000 citations of his scholarly works, reflecting his globally recognised contributions to soil science, environmental contamination and remediation research.
- 2025: The Enterprise World Magazine highlights Ravi Naidu as "Australia’s Most Influential Voices in Sustainability".
- 2022-2025: Australian Leader award by Research.com in two disciplines, including Environmental Sciences and Chemistry.
- 2023: Glinka Soil Prize by the United Nations FAO. It is the highest recognition in soil science sector.
- 2023: Recipient of European Geoscience's prestigious Kabata-Pendias Medal for outstanding research on toxic metals and soil science.
- 2022: Mahatma Gandhi Leadership award, House of Commons London for outstanding soil and environmental science research.
- 2022 Elected Chair of UN-FAO International Network on Soil Pollution (INSOP)
- 2013 Winner, Richard Pratt – Banksia CEO Award, Banksia Sustainability Awards

== Risk-based environmental remediation ==
Ravi Naidu's detailed analysis focuses on contaminants from agriculture and industry and their effects on the environment and humans. He explains that his research examines how contaminants are present in the environment, their interactions, and how they reach people or nature.

In his Glinka Award description, it is acknowledged that he had contributed research about contaminant and soil properties that helped sustainable soil management today. However, to do this, his investigations mostly target industrial contaminants, driven largely by the industries themselves.

Ravi Naidu and a few of his collaborators published a prospective review article in 2021 titled "Chemical pollution: A growing peril and potentially catastrophic risk to humanity." Accordingly to PlumX metrics, this article has captured the attention of various other articles, policy documents, social media, and news.

== International engagement ==
- UNEP Global Environmental Outlook 7: Naidu contributed to this report as one of the lead authors of the "Land and Soils" chapter.
- FAO Global Report on Soil Pollution (2021): Naidu led the SE Asia and Pacific section. The report has been cited in over 11 policy documents, 39 peer-reviewed articles, and discussed over 1,600 times in news and social media.
- UN-Intergovernmental Technical Panel on Soils (UN-ITPS): Serving member representing Oceania.
- International Network on Soil Pollution: Chair of the network.

== Publications ==
The following articles authored by Ravi Naidu cover his multidisciplinary environmental science career:

- Naidu, R., Biswas, B., Nuruzzaman, M. & Singh, B.K. 2025. Bioremediation strategies of heavy metal(loid)s in agricultural soils and crops. Nature Reviews Bioengineering. doi: https://doi.org/10.1038/s44222-025-00345-y
- Naidu, R., Bolan, N.S., Kookana, R.S., and the late Tiller, K.G. 1994. Ionic strength and pH effects on surface charge and Cd sorption characteristics of soils. European Journal of Soil Science 45, 419-429. External Link
- Naidu, R., Biswas, B., Willett, I.R., Cribb, J., Singh, B.K., Nathanail, C.P., Coulon, F., Semple, K.T., Jones, K.C., Barclay, A. & Aitken, R.J. 2021. Chemical pollution: A growing peril and potential catastrophic risk to humanity. Environment International, 156, 106616. External Link
- Naidu, R., Biswas, B., Chen, Z.-S., Jit, J., Rahman, M.M., Duan, L., Kim, J., Lee, K., Phenrat, T., Khan, N. & Wijayawardena, A. 2021. Status of Soil Pollution in Asia and the Pacific. Global Assessment of Soil Pollution. UNEP and FAO. External Link
- Naidu, R., Kookana, R.S., Sumner, M.E., Harter, R.D. & the late Tiller, K.G. 1997. Cadmium sorption and transport in Variable Charge Soil: A review. Journal of Environmental Quality 26, 602-617. External Link
- Dahlawi, S., Naeem, A., Rengel, Z. & Naidu, R. 2018. Biochar application for the remediation of salt-affected soils: Challenges and opportunities. Science of the Total Environment, 625, 320-335. External Link
- Smith, E., Naidu, R. & Alston, A.M. 1999. Chemistry of arsenic in soils: I. Sorption of arsenate and arsenite by four Australian soils. Journal of Environmental Quality, 28, 1719-1726. External Link
- Nuruzzaman, M., Rahman, M. M., Liu, Y. J. & Naidu, R. 2016. Nanoencapsulation, Nano-guard for Pesticides: A New Window for Safe Application. Journal of Agricultural and Food Chemistry, 64, 1447-1483. External Link
- Juhasz, A.L., Smith, E., Weber, J., Rees, M., Rofe, A., Kuchel, T., Sansom, L. & Naidu, R. 2006. In vivo assessment of arsenic bioavailability in rice and its impact on human health risk assessment. Environmental Health Perspectives, 114, 1826-1831. External Link
- Naidu, R., Arias, V. & Jit, J. 2016. Emerging Contaminants in the environment: Risk-based analysis for better management. Chemosphere, 154, 350-357. External Link
- Huq, S.M.I., Joardar, J.C., Parvin, S., Correll, R., & Naidu, R. 2006. Arsenic Contamination in Food-chain: Transfer of Arsenic into Food Materials through Groundwater Irrigation. Journal of Health Population and Nutrition, 24(3), 305-316. External Link
