= Muffazal Lakdawala =

Indian surgeon

- Education: Grant Medical College
- Occupation: Laparoscopic / Obesity Surgeon
- Spouses: Aditi Govitrikar (m. 1998–2009) Priyanka Kaul (m. 2011)
- Website: https://drmuffi.in/

Muffazal Lakdawala is an Indian bariatric surgeon and founder of Digestive Health Institute by Dr Muffi, the first Indian centre for excellence in bariatric surgery. He is the chairman of Institute of Minimal Invasive Surgical Sciences, Saifee Hospital, and the president of IFSO - Asia Pacific chapter.

He was awarded the first international surgeon of excellence designation by the US-based Surgical Review Corporation.

He has performed bariatric surgeries on several famous personalities, including the BJP President Nitin Gadkari, NCP's Nawab Malik, former State Cabinet minister Nitin Raut, BJP's Vinod Tawde and BJP leader Venkaiah Naidu.

== Personal life ==
Lakdawala was born and brought up in a Dawoodi Bohra family in Mumbai. He passed MBBS from Grant Medical College. Then he pursued his Masters in Surgery (M.S.) from B.Y.L. Nair Hospital and completed 3 years of residency programme in general surgery.

He lives in Mumbai with his wife, Priyanka Kaul. He has two children from his first marriage to Aditi Gowitrikar.

== Career ==
Lakdawala underwent training in Bariatric Surgery with Raul Rosenthal, Cleveland Clinic, United States, 2006. He was also trained at the Unit of Gastro Surgery, with Piet Pattyn from the University of Ghent Hospital, Belgium, 2005 and also underwent Training in Advanced Laparoscopic Colorectal Surgery with Prof. Seon Hahn Kim, Seoul, Korea, 2004. He has also been a lecturer at B.Y.L.Nair Hospital- a teaching hospital in Mumbai.

He is one of the only Indian surgeon to have demonstrated live surgery in almost every Asian country. Till date he has performed the largest number of single incision sleeve gastrectomy surgeries in the world. He is the first surgeon to conduct laparoscopic gastric bypass in India. He also successfully operated on a 30-year-old woman with unexplained body aches, to find a live worm inside her bile duct.

Lakdawala has performed sleeve gastrectomy surgery on Jayesh Malukani, one of the youngest Indian patient who is a 17-year-old boy. He has performed bariatric surgery on the heaviest man in Asia who weighed all of 285 kg (627 pounds) in Tianjen, China. He also successfully operated on Eman Ahmed, an Egyptian woman considered to be the heaviest in the world.

== Positions ==
- Chairman, Position Statement Committee, International Federation of the Society of Obesity and Metabolic Disorders (IFSO)
- Board Member, AETF - Asia Endosurgery Task Force (AETF)
- Member, Asia Pacific Metabolic and Bariatric Surgery Society (APMBSS)
- Director, Asian Consensus Meeting on Metabolic Surgery (ACMOMS)
- Head, Dept. of Minimal Access and Bariatric Surgery, Saifee Hospital, Mumbai
- Head, Expert Advisory Board for the Men’s Health Magazine

== Awards ==
He was awarded 'Humanitarian of the year' by the All India Human Rights Association in 2007 and a Silver Medal at Shirin Mehtaji Oration for ‘Obstructive Jaundice’ in 1996. He was also awarded as the Gold Medallist in Anatomy at First Year MBBS.
