= Kabhi Khushi Kabhie Gham (soundtrack) =

Soundtrack album by Jatin–Lalit, Sandesh Shandilya and Aadesh Shrivastava
- Released: 28 November 2001
- Genres: Bollywood music; Film soundtrack
- Language: Hindi
- Label: Sony Music India
- Producer: Yash Johar

Kabhi Khushi Kabhie Gham is the soundtrack album to the 2001 film of the same name directed by Karan Johar and produced by Yash Johar under Dharma Productions, featuring Amitabh Bachchan, Jaya Bachchan, Shah Rukh Khan, Kajol, Hrithik Roshan, and Kareena Kapoor. The soundtrack featured eleven compositions—five songs composed by Jatin–Lalit, five by Sandesh Shandilya, and one song by Aadesh Shrivastava, as a guest composer. Sameer wrote the lyrics for most of the songs, with the exception of one song written by Anil Pandey. The soundtrack was released under Sony Music India label on 28 November 2001 and received positive reviews, becoming the highest-selling Bollywood soundtrack of the year.

== Background ==
The soundtrack to Kabhi Khushi Kabhie Gham featured eleven compositions—Jatin–Lalit, who previously worked with Karan in Kuch Kuch Hota Hai (1998) had composed three original songs, including two sad versions of the title song; whereas Sandesh Shandilya had also composed three original songs, plus an instrumental "Soul of K3G" and a rendition of the national song "Vande Mataram". Aadesh Shrivatsava joined as the guest composer, composing one song "Say Shava Shava". The lyrics were provided by Sameer, except for "Suraj Hua Maddham" which was penned by Anil Pandey. The film score has been composed by Babloo Chakravarty.

Explaining the album, Karan Johar said, "I wanted music that had all kinds of tunes — pop, romantic, bhangra – but one sound. It had to be larger than life." He added that Jatin–Lalit came up with three "haunting melodies", while Shandilya and Shrivastava came up with the pop and bhangra songs, respectively.

== Reception ==
Upon its release on 26 October 2001, the soundtrack of Kabhi Khushi Kabhie Gham emerged as a major success by selling 2.5 million units within 30 days. It became the best-selling album of the year in India, with 3.5 million soundtrack album sales.

Writing for Rediff, Sukanya Varma praised most of the compositions, while being critical of the song "Say Shava Shava" due to the "overdose of Punjabi emotions". She summed up by saying, "The music of K3G has a presence. Hate it or love it, you certainly won't ignore it." According to Khalid Mohamed of The Times of India, "the music score has its high as well as flaccid points". Taran Adarsh of Bollywood Hungama stated that the album consisted of songs that are "upbeat", "mesmerising", "soulful" and "catchy", "offering a wide variety to the viewers." Shamaila Khan of BBC stated that "the music and song picturisations were fab" while Derek Elly of Variety wrote "Between the regulation six musical numbers, Babloo Chakravaty's copious background score makes hay with the catchy main theme as well as other musical montages."

== Track listing ==
No.	Title	Lyrics	Music	Singer(s)	Length
1.	"Kabhi Khushi Kabhie Gham"	Sameer	Jatin–Lalit	Lata Mangeshkar	7:55
2.	"Bole Chudiyan"	Sameer	Jatin–Lalit	Kavita Krishnamurthy, Alka Yagnik, Sonu Nigam, Udit Narayan, Amit Kumar	6:50
3.	"You Are My Soniya"	Sameer	Sandesh Shandilya	Alka Yagnik, Sonu Nigam	5:45
4.	"Suraj Hua Maddham"	Anil Pandey	Sandesh Shandilya	Alka Yagnik, Sonu Nigam	7:08
5.	"Say Shava Shava"	Sameer	Aadesh Shrivastava	Alka Yagnik, Sunidhi Chauhan, Udit Narayan, Sudesh Bhonsle, Aadesh Shrivastava, Amitabh Bachchan	6:50
6.	"Yeh Ladka Hai Allah"	Sameer	Jatin–Lalit	Alka Yagnik, Udit Narayan	5:28
7.	"Kabhi Khushi Kabhie Gham" (Sad) (Part 1)	Sameer	Jatin–Lalit	Sonu Nigam	1:53
8.	"Deewana Hai Dekho"	Sameer	Sandesh Shandilya	Alka Yagnik, Sonu Nigam, Kareena Kapoor	5:46
9.	"Kabhi Khushi Kabhie Gham" (Sad) (Part 2)	Sameer	Jatin–Lalit	Lata Mangeshkar	1:53
10.	"Soul of K3G"	—	Sandesh Shandilya	Instrumental	2:18
11.	"Vande Mataram (Note: This track was not included on Cassette format.)"	Bankim Chandra Chattopadhyay	Sandesh Shandilya	Usha Uthup, Kavita Krishnamurthy	4:15
Total length:					56:01

== Accolades ==
Award	Category	Nominee	Result
47th Filmfare Awards	Best Music Director	Jatin–Lalit	Nominated
47th Filmfare Awards	Best Lyricist	Anil Pandey for "Suraj Hua Maddham"	Nominated
47th Filmfare Awards	Best Lyricist	Sameer for "Kabhi Khushi Kabhie Gham"	Nominated
47th Filmfare Awards	Best Male Playback Singer	Sonu Nigam for "Suraj Hua Maddham"	Nominated
47th Filmfare Awards	Best Female Playback Singer	Alka Yagnik for "Suraj Hua Maddham"	Nominated
Valenciennes International Film Festival	Bleu Nord Award	Jatin–Lalit, Sandesh Shandilya, Aadesh Shrivastava	Won
3rd International Indian Film Academy Awards	Best Male Playback Singer	Sonu Nigam for "Suraj Hua Maddham"	Won
3rd International Indian Film Academy Awards	Best Background Score	Babloo Chakravarty	Won
3rd International Indian Film Academy Awards	Best Sound Recording	Anil Mathur and Nakul Kante	Won
Zee Cine Awards	Best Playback Singer – Male	Sonu Nigam for "Suraj Hua Maddham"	Won

== Controversies ==
A legal suit was filed against Johar for using the song "It's Raining Men" in the film without obtaining prior permission.

Despite the soundtrack's success, the duo Jatin–Lalit expressed their disappointment on bringing other composers to develop the soundtrack. As a result, Karan ended his collaboration with the duo and later associated with the trio Shankar–Ehsaan–Loy for the forthcoming ventures, beginning with Kal Ho Naa Ho (2003).

== Legacy ==
In 2002, Sony released another album titled Klub K3G, featuring remixes by Indian electronic music producers Akshai Sarin, Harshdeep Sidhu, Prempal Hans and others. A part of the song "Say Shava Shava" was reused as "Dekha Tenu Pehli Pehli Baar Ve" in Mr. & Mrs. Mahi (2024), which was sung by Mohammad Faiz.
