= Khullja Sim Sim =

- Genre: Game show
- Presented by: Aman Verma (season 1,3); Hussain Kuwajerwala (season 2)
- Original language: Hindi
- No. of seasons: 3

Production
- Camera setup: Multi-camera
- Running time: 49 minutes
- Production companies: Optimystix Entertainment (Seasons 1); BAG Films (Season 2); BIG Productions (Season 3)

Original release
- Network: STAR Plus (season 1-2); BIG Magic (season 3)
- Release: 27 July 2001

Khullja Sim Sim (transl. Open Sesame) is an Indian television game show which originally aired on STAR Plus for the first two seasons, premiered on 27 July 2001. The first season was hosted by Aman Verma and the second season by Hussain Kuwajerwala. The third season of the series premiered on BIG Magic on 17 September 2012, also hosted by Aman Verma, produced by 4 Lions Films.

== Cast ==
- Aman Verma as Host
- Hussain Kuwajerwala as Host
- Sandeep Baswana as Himself
