= Akashdeep S Batth =

Indian film producer and writer

Akashdeep Singh Batth
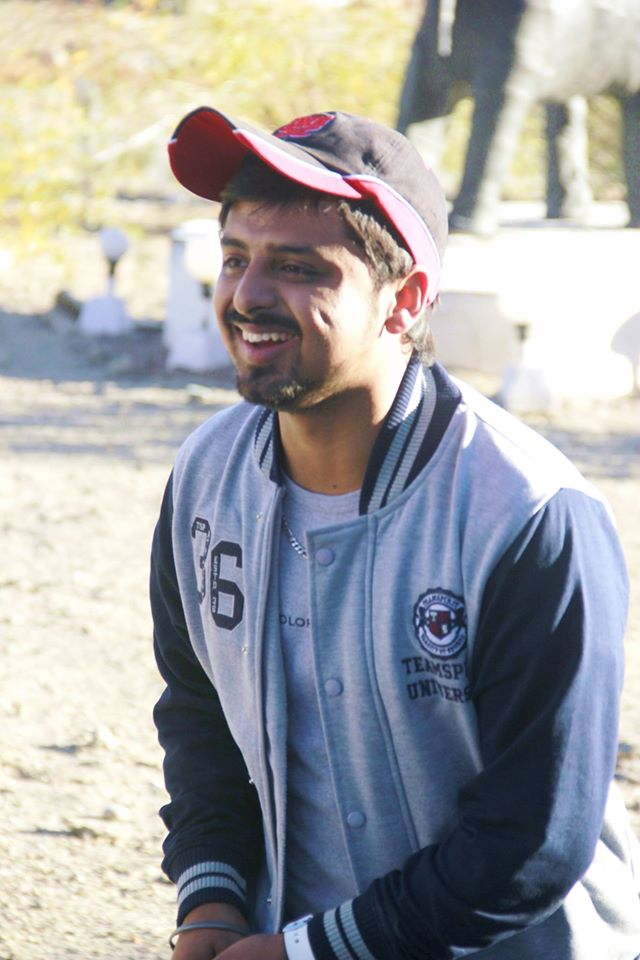
- Born: Akashdeep Singh Batth; 30 January 1992 (age 34); Jalandhar, Punjab, India
- Occupations: Film director, producer, author, screenwriter, politician (Belgium - Vooruit)
- Years active: 2011–present
- Spouse: Pritty Kaur Batth

Akashdeep Singh Batth (born 30 January 1992) is an Indian Punjabi film director, producer, author and screenwriter. Batth made his directional debut with Myself Ghaint (2014). In 2011, Batth became a published author with his English fiction Anhad -The Man on Mission. Akashdeep was 18 years old when he first published his English fiction and 22 years old when he released his first Punjabi feature film, Myself Ghaint, thus becoming the youngest film director in the Punjabi film industry.

== Filmography ==
Film	Status	Release date	Notes	Feature Film
Myself Ghaint	Released	9 May 2014	Co- Producer, director, screenwriter	Yes
We Are Warriors	Pre-Production	TBA	Co-Producer, director, screenwriter	Yes
The Akali Babbar	Pre Production	TBA	Director, screenwriter	Yes

== Author ==
Title	Status	Release date	Notes
Anhad- The Man on Mission	Released	30 December 2011	English novel (Fiction)
