= Akshaya Patra Foundation =

Indian non-profit organization

The Akshaya Patra Foundation
- Founded: 2000
- Type: Non profit organisation
- Location: Bangalore, Karnataka, India
- Products: Mid Day Meals
- Website: http://www.akshayapatra.org/

The Akshaya Patra Foundation is an independent charitable trust registered under the Indian Trusts Act 1882 (Reg. No. 154). Headquartered in Bengaluru, Karnataka, the organization serves as an implementing partner of the Government of India's PM POSHAN Abhiyaan, a school meal programme designed to improve the nutritional status of school-aged children nationwide. The programme was formerly known as the 'National Programme for Mid-Day Meal in Schools', popularly known as the Mid-Day Meal (MDM) Scheme.

Akshaya Patra is the largest NGO partner of the Government of India to implement the PM POSHAN Abhiyaan in government-run schools in India, a collaboration based on the public-private partnership (PPP) model. It is also one of the largest NGO-run school feeding programmes in the world.

Since its inception, Akshaya Patra has cumulatively served over 5 billion meals.

== History ==
Akshaya Patra began in 2000, serving mid-day meals in five schools in Bengaluru, Karnataka, containing 1,500 children. The organization identifies its mission as not having children miss education due to hunger with the vision that no child in India shall be deprived of education because of hunger.

When the Government of India's Mid-Day Meal (MDM) Scheme (now known as the PM POSHAN Abhiyaan) was launched in 2001, Akshaya Patra collaborated with various levels of governments in its implementation.

== Programmes ==
The Foundation serves over 2.35 million children through kitchens across 76 locations in 16 states and 3 union territories: Andhra Pradesh, Assam, Chhattisgarh, Daman & Diu and Dadra & Nagar Haveli, Delhi, Goa, Gujarat, Jharkhand, Karnataka, Madhya Pradesh, Maharashtra, Odisha, Puducherry, Rajasthan, Tamil Nadu, Telangana, Tripura, Uttar Pradesh and Uttarakhand.

In Vadodara and Surat in Gujarat, Ongole in Andhra Pradesh and Warangal in Telangana, Akshaya Patra implements the Anganwadi feeding programme to provide food to children in the age group of 3-6 in Anganwadis and pregnant women and lactating mothers in the area. As of 2014, 54,000 children and women were covered by the programme.

In addition to school feeding, Akshaya Patra also runs a programme to feed homeless women living in ashrams in Vrindavan, and has provided food to affected people during natural disasters, including the COVID-19 Pandemic. During the pandemic, it served around 250 million meals.

Akshaya Patra's kitchens have been a subject of study for the Harvard Business School on two occasions: 2007 and 2017.

== Awards ==
1. Gandhi Peace Prize 2016 for its contribution towards the socioeconomic development of India by providing mid-day meals to millions of children across the country.
2. Nikkei Asia Prize in the Economic and Business Innovation Category for supporting education by nourishing children, thus playing a pivotal role in the socioeconomic development of the region.
3. Outlook POSHAN Special Jury Award 2019 for its valuable contribution in the Urban Nutrition (Institution) category.
4. BBC Global Food Champion Award 2019 for its contribution to implementing the school feeding programme.
