= Hussain Kuwajerwala =

Indian television actor, host, and model

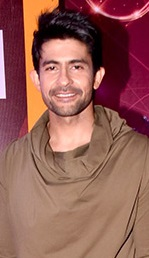
- Kuwajerwala in 2017
- Born: 12 October 1977 (age 49); Bombay, Maharashtra, India
- Occupations: Actor; anchor; model
- Years active: 1996–present
- Height: 175 cm (5 ft 9 in)
- Spouse: Tina Kuwajerwala (m. 2005)

Hussain Kuwajerwala is an Indian television actor, host and model. After several modelling campaigns and commercials, Kuwajerwala landed a role in the soap opera Kyunki Saas Bhi Kabhi Bahu Thi which was followed by a lead role in Kumkum - Ek Pyaara Sa Bandhan as Sumeet Wadhwa opposite Juhi Parmar (2002-2009). He is the winner of Nach Baliye 2 and also participated in Fear Factor: Khatron Ke Khiladi 6. Kuwajerwala made his Bollywood debut in 2013 with the film Shree. He made his television comeback after 8 years with the comedy show Sajan Re Phir Jhoot Mat Bolo (2017-2018) as Jaiveer Chopra.

== Television ==
Year	Title	Role
1996	Hum Paanch	Gattu
1998–2000	X Zone	Nishant
1998–2001	Aashirwad	Dinesh
1999	Rishtey	Bugs
1999	Rishtey	Amal
1999	Star Bestsellers	Abhimanyu
1999–2000	Kanyadaan	Dhruv
2000–2001	Sukanya	
2001–2003	Sarhadein	Annu
2001–2003	Kangan	Himanshu
2000–2004	Kyunki Saas Bhi Kabhi Bahu Thi	Chirag Virani
2002–2003	Kismey Kitna Hai Dum	Host
2002–2004	Krishna Arjun	Arjun Nanda
2002–2009	Kumkum - Ek Pyara Sa Bandhan	Sumeet Wadhwa / Sumeet Raichand
2003	Kuch Kar Dikhana Hai	Host
2004	Jeet	Dev
2004–2005	Khullja Sim Sim	Host
2005	Kalakarz	Host
2006	Nach Baliye 2	Contestant (Winner)
2006–2008	Shabaash India	Host
2007	Nach Baliye 3	Host
2007–2012	Indian Idol	Host
2008	Kaho Na Yaar Hai	Contestant
2008–2009	Oye! It's Friday!	Contestant
2009	Dance Premier League	Host
2011	Zor Ka Jhatka: Total Wipeout	Contestant
2012	Diya Aur Baati Hum	Guest
2013	Khullja Sim Sim	Host
2014	Kalakarz	Host
2014	India's Best Cinestars Ki Khoj	Host
2015	Bigg Boss Halla Bol	Guest
2015	Fear Factor: Khatron Ke Khiladi 6	Contestant
2015	Aaj Ki Raat Hai Zindagi	Contestant
2015	Indian Idol Junior	Host
2017–2018	Sajan Re Phir Jhooth Mat Bolo	Jaiveer Chopra
2023	Indian Idol	Host

=== Theatre ===
- Zangoora - The Gypsy Prince

=== Films ===
- 2013 - Shree as Shree

== Awards and nominations ==
Indian Telly Awards

- 2007 Style Icon of the Year Award

Indian Television Academy Awards

- 2007 Best Actor in a lead role (Popular)- Sumit Wadhwa- Kumkum – Ek Pyara Sa Bandhan(Nominated)
- 2018 Leading Star Male(Popular) -Jaiveer Chopra- Sajan Re Phir Jhooht Mat Bolo (Nominated)
- 2018 Best Actor Comedy (Jury)-Jaiveer Chopra- Sajan Re Phir Jhooht Mat Bolo(Nominated)

== See also ==
- List of Indian television actors
