= List of accolades received by Fashion (2008 film) =

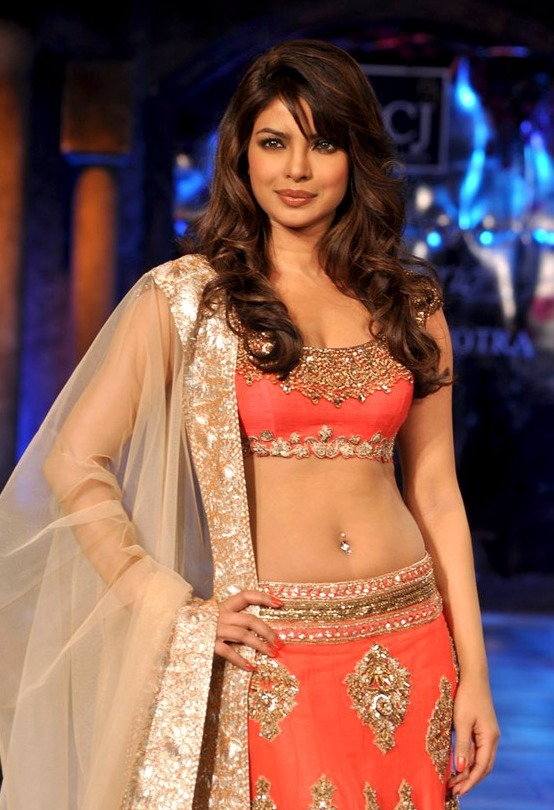
Priyanka Chopra won several awards, including the National and Filmfare awards for Best Actress for her performance in Fashion

Fashion is a 2008 Indian drama film directed by Madhur Bhandarkar and produced by UTV Motion Pictures. The film features Priyanka Chopra in the lead role, with Kangana Ranaut, Mugdha Godse, Arbaaz Khan and Arjan Bajwa in supporting roles as well as several professional fashion models playing themselves. Bhandarkar co-wrote the film with Ajay Monga and Anuraadha Tewari. Deven Murdeshwar edited the film while the cinematography was provided by Mahesh Limaye. Salim–Sulaiman composed the musical score, with lyrics written by Irfan Siddiqui and Sandeep Nath. The film focuses on the transformation of Meghna Mathur, an aspiring fashion model played by Chopra, from a small-town girl to a supermodel in the Indian fashion industry.

Produced on a budget of ₹180 million (US$1.9 million), Fashion was released on 29 October 2008 to critical acclaim and box-office success. It grossed ₹600 million (US$6.2 million) and was noted for being commercially successful despite being a women-centric film with no male lead. Fashion received various awards and nominations, with praise for its direction, the performance of the cast, screenplay, editing, musical score, and costume design.

At the 56th National Film Awards, Chopra and Ranaut won the awards for Best Actress and Best Supporting Actress respectively. The film received seven nominations at the 54th Filmfare Awards, including Best Director for Bhandarkar and Best Screenplay for Bhandarkar, Monga, and Tewari. Chopra and Ranaut also won the Filmfare Award for Best Actress and Best Supporting Actress respectively. Chopra won the Best Actress Award at the 15th Screen Awards, while Ranaut and Godse were nominated for Best Supporting Actress. At the 2009 Star Guild Awards, Chopra, Ranaut and Godse won the Best Actress in a Leading Role, Best Actress in a Supporting Role and Best Female Debut respectively. The film garnered six nominations at the 2009 Stardust Awards, including Best Film and Best Director for Bhandarkar.

== Accolades ==
Award	Date of ceremony (Note: Date is linked to the article about the awards held that year, wherever possible.)	Category	Recipient(s) and nominee(s)	Result	Ref(s)
Apsara Film & Television Producers Guild Awards (Note: Also known as Star Guild Awards.)	6 December 2009	Best Actress in a Leading Role	Priyanka Chopra	Won	
Apsara Film & Television Producers Guild Awards	6 December 2009	Best Actress in a Supporting Role	Kangana Ranaut	Won	
Apsara Film & Television Producers Guild Awards	6 December 2009	Best Female Debut	Mugdha Godse	Won	
Apsara Film & Television Producers Guild Awards	6 December 2009	Best Lyricist	Irfan Siddique for "Mar Jaava"	Nominated	
Apsara Film & Television Producers Guild Awards	6 December 2009	Best Editing	Devendra Murdeshwar	Nominated	
Apsara Film & Television Producers Guild Awards	6 December 2009	Best Costume Design	Rita Dhody	Nominated	
Filmfare Awards	28 February 2009	Best Director	Madhur Bhandarkar	Nominated	
Filmfare Awards	28 February 2009	Best Actress	Priyanka Chopra	Won	
Filmfare Awards	28 February 2009	Best Supporting Actress	Kangana Ranaut	Won	
Filmfare Awards	28 February 2009	Best Female Debut	Mugdha Godse	Nominated	
Filmfare Awards	28 February 2009	Best Female Playback Singer	Neha Bhasin for "Kuch Khaas"	Nominated	
Filmfare Awards	28 February 2009	Best Female Playback Singer	Shruti Pathak for "Mar Jaava"	Nominated	
Filmfare Awards	28 February 2009	Best Screenplay	Madhur Bhandarkar, Ajay Monga, Anuraadha Tewari	Nominated	
International Indian Film Academy Awards	13 June 2009	Best Director	Madhur Bhandarkar	Nominated	
International Indian Film Academy Awards	13 June 2009	Best Actress	Priyanka Chopra	Won	
International Indian Film Academy Awards	13 June 2009	Best Supporting Actress	Kangana Ranaut	Won	
International Indian Film Academy Awards	13 June 2009	Best Story	Madhur Bhandarkar, Ajay Monga, Anuraadha Tewari	Nominated	
Lions Gold Awards	14 January 2009	Favourite Actor in a Leading Role – Female	Priyanka Chopra	Won	
National Film Awards	20 March 2010	Best Actress	Priyanka Chopra	Won	
National Film Awards	20 March 2010	Best Supporting Actress	Kangana Ranaut	Won	
Screen Awards	14 January 2009	Best Actress	Priyanka Chopra	Won	
Screen Awards	14 January 2009	Best Actress (Popular Choice)	Priyanka Chopra	Nominated	
Screen Awards	14 January 2009	Best Supporting Actress	Kangana Ranaut	Nominated	
Screen Awards	14 January 2009	Best Supporting Actress	Mugdha Godse	Nominated	
Screen Awards	14 January 2009	Best Female Playback	Shruti Pathak for "Mar Jaava"	Nominated	
Screen Awards	14 January 2009	Best Story	Madhur Bhandarkar, Ajay Monga, Anuraadha Tewari	Nominated	
Stardust Awards	15 February 2009	Best Film	Fashion	Nominated	
Stardust Awards	15 February 2009	Best Director	Madhur Bhandarkar	Nominated	
Stardust Awards	15 February 2009	Star of the Year – Female	Priyanka Chopra	Won	
Stardust Awards	15 February 2009	Best Supporting Actress	Kangana Ranaut	Won	
Stardust Awards	15 February 2009	Breakthrough Performance – Male	Arjan Bajwa	Nominated	
Stardust Awards	15 February 2009	Breakthrough Performance – Female	Mugdha Godse	Nominated	
V. Shantaram Awards	21 December 2009	Best Director	Madhur Bhandarkar	Nominated	
V. Shantaram Awards	21 December 2009	Best Actress	Priyanka Chopra	Nominated	
V. Shantaram Awards	21 December 2009	Best Female Debut	Mugdha Godse	Nominated	

== See also ==
- List of Bollywood films of 2008
