= Miditech =

Indian television production company

- Industry: Entertainment
- Founded: 1993
- Founder: Niret Alva and Nikhil Alva
- Headquarters: Mumbai, India & Gurgaon, Haryana
- Key people: Niret Alva; Nikhil Alva; Nivedith Alva
- Products: Television Programs
- Website: Official Website

Miditech Pvt. Ltd. is an Indian television production company based in Gurgaon, Mumbai, and Bangalore, India.

== History ==
It was founded in 1992 by brothers Niret Alva and Nikhil Alva and is today a Rs 50-crore television software company. The company creates documentaries and programming for television.

== Programs ==
- Living on the Edge (TV Magazine featuring environmental issues)
- Head On! (Documentary of 1996 Charkhi Dadri mid-air collision)
- Air Hijack (Documentary of Indian Airlines Flight 814)
- Inside : Mumbai Terror Attack
- Wheels (TV series) (1998)
- Hum 2 Hain Na (2004)
- Fame Gurukul (Reality-singing competition) (2005)
- Indian Idol (Reality-singing competition) (2005–2009)
- Deal Ya No Deal (TV series) (2005)
- Galli Galli Sim Sim (TV series) (2006)
- M.A.D. (Art & Craft Show) (2005)
- Chhoona Hai Aasmaan (TV series) (2007)
- K For Kishore (2007)
- Champion Chaalbaaz No.1 (Reality-comedy show) (2007)
- Skatoony (TV Series) (2008)
- Naya Roop Nayi Zindagi (Reality-makeover show) (2008)
- PokerFace: Dil Sachcha Chehra Jhootha (Reality-game show) (2009)
- Iss Jungle Se Mujhe Bachao (Reality-game show) (2009)
- Sitaron Ko Choona Hai (Reality-talent show) (2009)
- Ninja Pandav (Reality-show) (2009)
- Sarkaar Ki Duniya (Reality-show) (2009)
- Shaitaan: A Criminal Mind (Crime Drama Series) (2013)
- Kyuki Jeena Isi Ka Naam Hai (TV series)

=== Productions ===
Year	Serial	Channel	Status
2014–2015	Airlines	Star Plus	Off-Air
2012	Survivor India	Star Plus	Off Air
2011	Khiladi No. 1	Big Magic	Off Air
2011 – present	Super Stud	UTV Bindaas	On-Air
2011 – present	Trapped in Ladakh	National Geographic	On-Air
2011 – present	MTV Louders	MTV	Off-Air
2011 – present	Guinness World Records-Ab India Todega	Colors TV	Off-Air
2011 – present	Chris Saleems Boho Kitchen	FOOD First	On-Air
2011 – present	Adam vs Madam	Channel V	On-Air
2011 – present	Girls Night Out	MTV	On-Air
2011	Kyunki Jeena Isi Ka Naam Hain	DD National	Off-Air
2011 – present	Namoora Yuva Rani	Etv Kannada	Off Air
