= Lesley Lewis =

Lesley Lewis may refer to:

- Lesley Lewis (script editor), Australian scriptwriter and editor
- Lesley Lewis (art historian) (1909–2010), English historian of art and architecture

== See also ==
- Leslie Lewis (disambiguation)
- Lesle Lewis (disambiguation)
