= Hum 2 Hain Na =

Indian 2004–05 TV series

- Also known as: Hum Do Hain Na
- Genre: Children's
- Based on: Cómplices Al Rescate
- Screenplay by: Anuraadha Tewari
- Directed by: Swapna Waghmare Joshi
- Creative directors: Anil Jha
- Creative supervisors: Monia Pinto; Mitu
- Starring: Hansika Motwani; Shruti Ulfat /; Geetanjali Tikekar; Cezanne Khan; Nigaar Khan; Benjamin Gilani; Manini De; Vidya Sinha
- Theme music composer: Leslie Lewis
- Lyrics: Amitabh Verma
- Opening theme: "Hum do hain na..." by Upagna Pandya and Reewa
- Country of origin: India
- Original language: Hindi
- No. of seasons: 1
- No. of episodes: 124

Production
- Producers: Niret Alva; Nikhil Alva
- Running time: 20–22 minutes
- Production company: Miditech

Original release
- Network: Sony TV
- Release: 2 August 2004 – 3 March 2005

Related
- Cúmplices de um Resgate

Hum 2 Hain Na (transl. There are two of us, right?) is an Indian Hindi-language television series that aired on Sony TV from Mondays to Thursdays in India in the 8–8:30 pm time slot from 2004 to 2005 starring Hansika Motwani in a double role.

An official Indian adaptation of the 2002 Mexican telenovela, Cómplices Al Rescate (transl. Friends to the Rescue), it was directed by Swapna Waghmare Joshi, written by Anuraadha Tewari and produced by Niret Alva and Nikhil Alva under their production house, Miditech.

The series revolves around two 13-year-old identical twins, Kareena and Koel (both portrayed by Motwani) separated at birth, having got aspirations to become popstars one day, with destiny making them meet.

== Premise ==
Premise by (defunct) Miditech website:

“Hum 2 Hain Na is a heartwarming story of two thirteen year old girls – Kareena and Koel, identical twins separated shortly after birth.

They are brought together by their passion for music. Kareena and Koel have been raised in worlds poles apart, but destiny miraculously brings them together and here begins their story full of smiles and tears, fun and friendship.

Kareena has been brought up amidst riches and luxuries and lives in a fashionable, elegant mansion with her parents Anand and Shyla Dhanrajgir. Kareena has grown up to be a rich but lonely girl who dreams of becoming a famous singer one day. Koel, on the other hand, grows up as a simple middle class girl brought up by her mother, Anjali. Koel is gifted with an enchanting voice and her best friend is her ‘talking dog’ Bruno, a dog with a super cool attitude!

Koel and Kareena are absolutely unaware of each other’s existence till such time that fate intervenes and the girls coincidentally meet. Oblivious to the fact that they are twin sisters, the two discover an uncanny resemblance to each other even though their personalities are opposites. They very soon develop a strong bond of love and friendship but decide to keep their newfound relationship a secret.”

== Cast ==
- Hansika Motwani as Kareena and Koel
- Shruti Ulfat / Geetanjali Tikekar as Anjali
- Cezanne Khan as Veer Singh
- Nigaar Khan as Shyla Dhanrajgir
- Benjamin Gilani as Anand Dhanrajgir
- Manini De as Sasha
- Vidya Sinha as Koel's grandmother

== Production ==
=== Development ===
Premiering in 2002, Cómplices al Rescate received a lot of popularity and emerged as a success in Mexico as well as throughout Latin America.

This led to Sony acquiring the rights of the telenovela from Televisa for adapting it in India.

Previously, Sony had also found success by adapting 1999–2001 Colombian telenovela, Yo soy Betty, la fea, into Indian soap opera, Jassi Jaissi Koi Nahin (2003–2006).

The story was adapted for Indian television by Vijay Krishna Acharya, who also wrote dialogues for the series.

== Release ==
The series premiered on 2 August 2004. A preview event was organised in New Delhi on 23 July 2004.

== Reception ==
=== Audience viewership ===
According to the TAM Media Research data, Hum 2 Hain Na, in its opening week, in the TG (Target Group) CS 4+ (Cable & Satellite; 4 years of age or older) i.e. Hindi-speaking markets, recorded a TVR (Television Viewership Rating) of 1.76–1.84, 1.64–1.68, 1.37–1.42 and 1.38–1.4 on its opening day i.e. Monday, Tuesday, Wednesday and Thursday respectively. (Note: Exchange4Media reported TVR of 1.76, 1.68, 1.37 and 1.38 respectively.; Indian Television Dot Com reported TVR of 1.84, 1.64, 1.42 and 1.4 respectively.) In kids' TG it averaged a TVR over 2.

=== Critical response ===
The Tribune criticised the series for low production value, describing it as a 'poorly produced serial.'

A critic at The Tribune wrote, "With Hansika Motwani doing the twin act and a star cast of Benjamin Gilani, Shruti Ulfat and Nigar Khan, the channel could have had a sure winner on its hands. But poor production values dilute its impact. Sony should know that cutting corners never pays...especially on TV."

=== Cancellation ===
Owing to failure in receiving satisfactory TVR, the series went off air on the Thursday of 9th week of 2005. Its slot was temporarily utilised to broadcast Indian Idol-related content. Eventually, the romantic soap opera, Kaisa Ye Pyar Hai replaced the same and premiered on 29 March 2005 in 8:00 pm to 8:30 pm time slot.

== Soundtrack ==
The title track of the series, Hum Do Hain Na... Hain Na, Hain Na, Hain Na?! was composed by Leslee Lewis. It was sung by Upagna Pandya and Reewa Rathod (credited as Reewa). The lyrics were penned by Amitabh Verma.

== Global TV adaptation comparisons ==
Comparison of characters across global adaptations of Cómplices al rescate (Note: There is also a Greek adaptation of the telenovela, titled, συνένοχοι για τη διάσωση (Esperanto title: Komplicoj al la rekupero), that premiered in 2007 on Mega Channel and ran for a short period of time. Not much is known about the cast.)
Role	Original Mexican telenovela (2002)	Indian adaptation (2004–05)	Brazilian adaptation (2015–16)
Title	Cómplices Al Rescate	Hum 2 Hain Na	Cúmplices de um Resgate
Network	Las Estrellas	Sony TV	SBT
Language	Spanish	Hindi	Portuguese
Identical Twins	Silvana del Valle Ontiveros and Mariana Cantú essayed by Belinda Peregrín (replaced by Daniela Luján from episode 92)	Kareena and Koel; essayed by Hansika Motwani	Manuela Agnes Fará and Isabela Saldanha Junqueira; essayed by Larissa Manoela
Birth Mom	Rocío Cantú; essayed by Laura Flores	Anjali; essayed by Shruti Ulfat (replaced by Geetanjali Tikekar later on)	Rebecca Agnes; essayed by Juliana Baroni
Birth Mom's Love Interest	Alberto del Río; essayed by Francisco Gattorno	Veer Singh; essayed by Cezanne Khan	Otávio Neto; essayed by Duda Nagle
Rich Mom	Regina Ontiveros de Del Valle; essayed by Cecilia Gabriella	Shyla Dhanrajgir; essayed by Nigaar Khan	Regina Saldanha Junqueira; essayed by Maria Pinna
Rich Dad	Rolando del Valle; essayed by Manuel Saval	Anand Dhanrajgir; essayed by Benjamin Gilani	Orlando Junqueira; essayed by Alexandre Barros
Aunt	Helena Cantú; essayed by Silvia Lomelí	Sasha; essayed by Manini De	Helena Agnes; essayed by Thays Gorga
Grandma	Doña Pura Cantú; essayed by Norma Herrera	Essayed by Vidya Sinha	Nina Agnes; essayed by Mira Haar
Talking Dog	Mantequilla (Butter); Labrador; voice acted by Eugenio Derbez	Bruno; Labrador; voice actor unknown	Manteiguinha; Golden Retriever; voice acted by Diego Lima
