= Touqeer =

Touqeer is a surname. Notable people with the surname include:

- Sumbul Touqeer, Indian actress
- Qazi Touqeer, Indian singer
