= Padduram =

- Directed by: Ajay Monga
- Written by: Ajay Monga
- Starring: Rachit Sidana; Juhi Parmar; Suresh Menon; Deven Bhojani; Vijay Patkar; Shubham Kataria; Anshika
- Cinematography: Duleep Regmi
- Edited by: Steven Bernard
- Music by: Gaurav DasGupta; Ashutosh Singh
- Release date: 2011
- Country: India
- Language: Hindi

Padduram was the directorial debut film by Ajay Monga who has written films like Fashion and Corporate. The film was released in 2011.

== Plot ==
Padduram is the story of a boy Debashish Mehra (Debu) who has a flatulence problem. Being the target of ridicule the boy starts going into his shell. Worried parents try to remedy the situation but do not succeed. It is only when he befriends Aditya that Debu starts coming to terms with himself. Eventually, Debu turns his weakness into strength and helps his dad in his business.

== Cast ==
- Rachit Sidana as Debashish Mehra(a.k.a. Debu/Dabboo), an 11-year-old boy who has a flatulence problem.
- Juhi Parmar as Gitanjali Mehra, Debu's mother
- Suresh Menon as Debu's father
- Shubham Kataria as Aditya, Debu's friend
- Vijay Patkar as Gagan the mysterious neighbor
- Deven Bhojani as the narrator
- Anshika as Aditi, Aditya's sister

== Production ==
The shooting of the film was held in Indore and Mumbai. Initially, Darsheel Safary was cast to play one of the main characters in the film. But due to his demand for a steep price, the role was given to debutant Shubham Kataria. Rachit Sidana who played Little Iqbal in Thoda Pyaar Thoda Magic plays the title role of Padduram. Juhi Parmar, Suresh Menon, Deven Bhojani and Vijay Patkar form the supporting cast of the film.

== Promotion ==
Ajay Monga has also initiated one of its kind merchandising activities for the film's promotion through his venture firm Padduram franchise pvt. ltd.(PFPL) The firm will be engaged into Promotional giveaways like Padduram branded toys, T-shirts, comic books etc.

== Music ==
The tracks are composed by Gaurav Dasgupta and Ashutosh Singh.

=== Track listing ===
| No. | Title | Length |
|---|---|---|
| 1. | "Gubbare mein hawa bhar gayi" |
| 2. | "Har Pal" |
| 3. | "Chiki Chiki boom boom" |
| 4. | "Sun meri dhun" |
| 5. | "Bhoola nahin main woh baatein" |
| 6. | "Aya aya Dekho woh aya" |
| 7. | "Fart Medleys" |
