= Airlines (Indian TV series) =

Indian television series

- Har Udaan Ek Toofan
- Genre: Drama
- Created by: Nikhil J Alva; Niret Alva
- Written by: Advaita Kala
- Screenplay by: Advaita Kala
- Directed by: Supavitra Babul
- Starring: Tulip Joshi; VJ.Yudhishtir
- Country of origin: India
- Original language: Hindi
- No. of seasons: 1
- No. of episodes: 20

Production
- Editor: Shahid Saif
- Camera setup: Multi-camera
- Running time: 40 minutes
- Production company: Miditech

Original release
- Network: StarPlus
- Release: 24 August 2014 – 1 February 2015

Airlines - Har Udaan Ek Toofan is an Indian television series aired on StarPlus from 24 August 2014 to 1 February 2015 during Sundays. Produced by Miditech, it starred Tulip Joshi and VJ Yudhishtir.

== Plot ==
It follows the journey of an ambitious young woman Ananya Rawat who marks to become a top female pilot amongst this male dominant industry along with the ups and downs between her and her co pilot Akash Saluja.

== Cast ==
- Tulip Joshi as Ananya Rawat
- VJ Yudhishtir as Akash Saluja
- Ankit Kakkar
- Himmanshoo A. Malhotra as Rohit Mafatlal
- Sonica D'Souza as Natasha Gupta: In-flight manager
- Nandamuri Balakrishna
- Manju Warrier
- Ahmad Harhash as Shekhar Gupta

== Development ==
=== Production ===
Real life pilots were roped for tutoring the actors. The production company collaborated along with Pixion for computer graphics and visual effects.

A setup of Boeing 737 was made for shooting the sequences inside an aircraft at the Noida Film City. ₹85 Lakhs were spent for the construction of the sets.

Originally planned for 26 episodes, it ended with 20 episodes due to low viewership. The shooting of the series was wrapped up on 1 January 2015.

=== Promotion ===
Before its premiere, an event was held at Hotel Grand in Delhi for promotion of the series.

=== Casting ===
The series marks the television debut of Bollywood actress Tulip Joshi and VJ turned actor Yudhisthir in lead roles. Real life journalist Donal Bisht who was working for News Express, Delhi was cast as to play a journalist onscreen, making her acting debut. Due to the premature end of the series, the plans of actor Himmanshoo A. Malhotra playing dual role and the entry of Kumar Vishwas were dropped.

=== Filming ===
Set in Delhi, the series is set in the backdrop of aviation. The series was extensively shot at Noida Film City. It was also shot in Terminal 3 of Indra Gandhi International Airport of Delhi. Besides it was shot in Gurgaon and Manesar.

=== Training ===
I could not do any such real-life training but I did research a lot on the internet, especially the body language because that is the most important aspect.

— Tulip Joshi

== Reception ==
Firstpost reviewed the series stating, "It’s welcome that a television serial has a working woman as the main lead. Airlines is marked by terrible acting and very poor production value. The direction is very saas-bahu (mother in law - daughter in law), with actors doing triple takes unnecessarily."

News18 quoted, "The story of an ambitious girl's journey through a world of gender discrimination is a must watch."

The Indian Express rated it 1/2 stating, "The two episodes we have seen so far have been very turbulent in nature. The special effects too are basic, and nothing that make the flying experience thrilling or soaring. This show — and Ananya — needs more punch if they want to crack the glass ceiling."

Overall, it received criticism mainly for its visual effects.
