= Suhit Gosain =

Former Indian singer

Suhit Gosain (born 1985) is a former Indian singer from Bhopal, who gained popularity as a contestant of Indian Idol season 3, where he received attention for his "rockstar" image. After Indian Idol, he was part of a short-lived boy band called F4.

== Career ==
=== Television ===
Suhit was a contestant in the third season of Indian Idol, where he made it to the Top 14. After being eliminated in the Piano round, he returned for the Wild Card round, where he was among the 6 shortlisted out of the previously eliminated 18 contestants. He was one of the Top 4 who moved to the final Wild Card round, but was eliminated again.

In the show, he was seen as the favourite of Alisha Chinai, who was one of the judges, while Javed Akhtar who was another judge was critical of him.

After the show, Suhit appeared in a successful advertisement for KitKat. He hosted the reality show Sitaron Ko Choona Hai with Sunanda Wong, and was also one of the hosts of the city auditions of Indian Idol season 4.

=== Music ===
After Indian Idol 3, Suhit along with his fellow contestants from the show Meiyang Chang, Parleen Singh Gill, and Abhishek Kumar, formed the band F4. F4 released an album Tu To Na Aai produced by Sony BMG Music Entertainment. They also did live shows, but were disbanded shortly after.

=== Film ===
Suhit was set to debut as the lead actor in a film called The Seventeens, produced by Pritish Nandy Communications and directed by Arindam Mitra, but it was shelved after the recession of 2008. His band F4 had done playback for the film.

=== Corporate ===
Suhit did his MBA from FLAME School of Communication where he was awarded for academic achievement and included in the Dean's Roll of Honor for the academic year 2009–10, and then did an Executive MBA from IIM Calcutta. In 2023, he became the National Head of Concepts and Content Marketing (Marcom) at Kestone.
