= Anuraadha Tewari =

Indian film writer and director

- Born: Banaras, Uttar Pradesh, India
- Occupations: Screenwriter, film director
- Years active: 1996 – present

Anuraadha Tewari is a Mumbai based Writer – Director, working prolifically for the last 3 decades in the Indian Entertainment Industry. With a Masters’ Degree and a Gold Medal in Film Direction from the prestigious Film School of Jamia Millia Islamia, New Delhi, Anuradha has ever since written 7 Films, 25 Tv Shows and has 5 released Web Series. Most known for the 2008 film Fashion (Story and Screenplay Writer) that won the National Award for both its female leads (Priyanka Chopra Jonas and Kangana Ranaut) and was nominated for all the Top Cinema Awards of the year. She is also known for the Story and Screenplay of critically acclaimed films like Jail (2009) and Heroine ( 2012).

In 2017, Anuraadha created the first Writing Co. of India called KOSEN RUFU which sets up Writers’ Rooms, sourcing and training new writing talent and giving them an opportunity to work in the Industry. She also runs a Certification Course in the Foundations of Screenwriting called the LANGUAGE OF CINEMA under her banner FILM GURUKUL that teaches Conscious Creativity.

== Personal life ==
Anuraadha attended the Welham Girls' School and was the National Topper of ISC Commerce 1989. Later, she graduated from Lady Shri Ram College, New Delhi in B.Com. Hons and was the President of the Students' Union. She earned a master's degree in Mass Communication and was a gold medalist in Film Direction from the Film School of MCRC, Jamia Millia Islamia.

== Filmography ==
=== Film ===
Year	Film	Notes
2001	Rahul	
2001	Yaadein	
2002	Supaari	
2008	Fashion	
2009	Jail	
2012	Heroine	

=== Television ===
Year	Title	Network
2000	Yeh Meri Life Hai	SonyLiv
2002–2003	Salaam Zindagi	SonyLiv
2003–2007	Shararat	Star Plus
2003	Yahaan Ke Hum Sikandar	Zee Next
2004	Jab Love Hua	Zee
2004–2005	Dhoom Machaao Dhoom	Disney
2004	Hum 2 Hain Na	Sony
2005	Saaksshi	Sony
2005–2006	Kaajjal	Sony
2006	Jeete Hain Jisske Liye	Sony
2007–2008	Chhoona Hai Aasmaan	Star One
2010	Seven	YRF Television
2011–2012	Crazy, Stupid, Ishq	Channel V
2011–2013	Ek Hazaaron Mein Meri Behnaa Hai	Star Plus
2012–present	Savdhaan India	Life Ok
2013	O Gujariya	Channel V
2014–2015	Humsafars	SonyLiv
2015	Qubool Hai - Season 5	ZEE
2016	Adhuuri Humaari Kahaani	& TV
2016	Girls On Top	MTV
2017	Laakhon Mein Ek - Season 2	Amazon Prime Video
2024	Raisinghani vs Raisinghani	SonyLiv
2024	Dil Dosti Dilemma	Amazon Prime Video
