= Sarkaar Ki Duniya =

- Promotional logo
- Created by: Miditech
- Presented by: Ashutosh Rana
- Country of origin: India
- Original language: Hindi

Production
- Producer: Miditech

Original release
- Network: Real TV
- Release: 2 March – 3 July 2009

Sarkaar Ki Duniya is a reality television show that aired on Real TV from 2 March 2009 to 3 July 2009, modelled on Survivor. It took place on Mango Island in Karwar, Karnataka, and was hosted by film actor Ashutosh Rana.

18 contestants were selected from all over India to be put together. Every week, there was a Dal Nayak (Community Leader) who is elected and assigned a task along with an assigned amount. The Dal Nayak has immunity and is exempt from the elimination. Each player has to pay a tax once a week and the least three tax payers are up for Nishkasan (elimination). The rest of the Dal eliminates one player every week.

Few notable faces being Qazi Touqeer, who was winner of singing reality show Fame Gurukul defeating profiling singer Arijit Singh.

When the game reached the last four stages, the Nishkasan (elimination) rights were revoked and open to the Indian public to vote for the Maha-Nayak. The final four were Puneesh, Rahshid, Ali Mughal and Sanju.

The Grand Finale was telecast on 3 July 2009. The winner was Mr. Puneesh Sharma from Delhi and he won Rs. One Crore as prize money.

Puneesh Sharma and Qazi Touqeer later featured in another reality show Bigg Boss.
