= Producers Guild Film Award for Best Female Debut =

Annual Indian film award

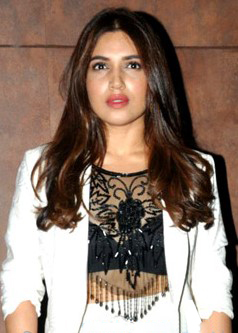
- 2016 Recipient Bhumi Pednekar
- Awarded for: Best Debut Performance by an Actress
- Country: India
- Presented by: Film & Television Producers Guild
- First award: 2006 (for performances in films released around 2005)
- Final award: 2016 (for performances in films released around 2015)
- Currently held by: Bhumi Pednekar, Dum Laga Ke Haisha (2016)
- Website: Producers Guild Film Awards

The Producers Guild Film Award for Best Female Debut (previously known as the Apsara Award for Best Female Debut) is given by the producers of the film and television guild as part of its annual award ceremony for Hindi films, to recognise a female actor who has delivered an outstanding performance in her debut film. While the official awards ceremony started in 2004, awards for the best female debut commenced two years later.

== Winners ==
=== 2000s ===
- 2004
  No award
- 2005
  No award
- 2006
  Vidya Balan – Parineeta as Lalita
- 2007
  No award
- 2008
  Deepika Padukone – Om Shanti Om as Shantipriya/Sandhya (Sandy)
- 2009
  Mugdha Godse – Fashion as Janet Sequeira

=== 2010s ===
- 2010
  Anushka Sharma – Rab Ne Bana Di Jodi as Tania "Taani" Sahni
- 2011
  Sonakshi Sinha – Dabangg as Rajo
- 2012
  Parineeti Chopra – Ladies vs Ricky Bahl as Dimple Chaddha
- 2013
  Ileana D'Cruz – Barfi! as Shruti Ghosh/Sengupta
- 2014
  Vaani Kapoor – Shuddh Desi Romance as Tara
- 2015
  Kriti Sanon – Heropanti as Dimpy Chaudhary
- 2016
  Bhumi Pednekar – Dum Laga Ke Haisha as Sandhya Varma

== See also ==
- Producers Guild Film Awards
- Producers Guild Film Award for Best Male Debut
