= Living on the Edge (Indian TV series) =

Television series

- Created by: Miditech Pvt. Ltd.
- Developed by: Miditech
- Presented by: Niret Alva
- Country of origin: India
- Original language: English

Production
- Running time: 60 minutes

Original release
- Network: Doordarshan / Star Plus
- Release: 1994 – 1996

Living on the Edge is a weekly Indian TV show about environmental issues. It was aired on the Indian national broadcast network, Doordarshan and Star TV over a period of five years, in the 90s.

Hosted by Niret Alva, it explored different aspects of human exploitation of nature and natural resources and pollution. It was launched on the day of the 1994 final Football World Cup and managed to garner a large audience, as it was slotted just before the final match began.

== Popularity ==
At the time of airing, Living on the Edge was one of the most popular English programmes on Indian Television. However, the show was taken off air in 1996 for lack of sponsorship.

== Awards ==
- Won the Most Informative Series Category at the Onida Awards in 1995
- Won a Panda award at Wildscreen in Bristol in 1996
