= Tera Mujhse Hai Pehle Ka Naata Koi =

Television series

- Genre: Drama, Thriller
- Written by: Sanjay Kumar, Anshuman Sinha
- Creative director: Amitabh Raina
- Starring: See below
- Country of origin: India
- Original language: Hindi
- No. of seasons: 1

Production
- Running time: Approx. 24 minutes
- Production company: Cinevistaas Limited

Original release
- Network: Sony TV
- Release: 11 October 2010 – 10 February 2011

Tera Mujhse Hai Pehle Ka Naata Koi (transl. You and I must have some connection before) is an Indian drama television series.

== Plot ==
21-year old Tashi has grown up in the lush valleys and mountains of Manali. Brought up by her father Adheer Singh after her mother's demise, she idolizes him. She believes in textbook romances inspired by her father's devotion to her mother Rohini who he still loves, seventeen years after her death. She helps her father with his restaurant business.

Tashi's best friend is Rohan and they have grown up inseparable from each other. However, a whirlwind romance with a handsome stranger, Arjun, leads to a hurried marriage and then she stumbles upon a lie that Arjun had told her - that he does not have a family. Tashi realizes that she has married into a royal family from Rajasthan - a family shrouded in mystery and hiding dark secrets.

Soon enough, Tashi discovers the murky truth about her in-laws and most importantly a curse that threatens to shatter her present and future. She finds herself trusting and mistrusting almost everyone around her.

In the face of such extreme adversities, Tashi discovers courage to take on the might of evil and emerges victorious in her bid to save herself, her husband and her unborn child.

== Cast ==
- Janvi Chheda as Tashi
- Mahesh Thakur as Adheer Singh, Tashi's father
- Karan Hukku as Arjun Singh, Tashi's husband
- Kunal Verma as Rohan, Tashi's best friend
