= Malini Kishor Sanghvi College of Commerce & Economics =

Commerce college in Maharashtra, India

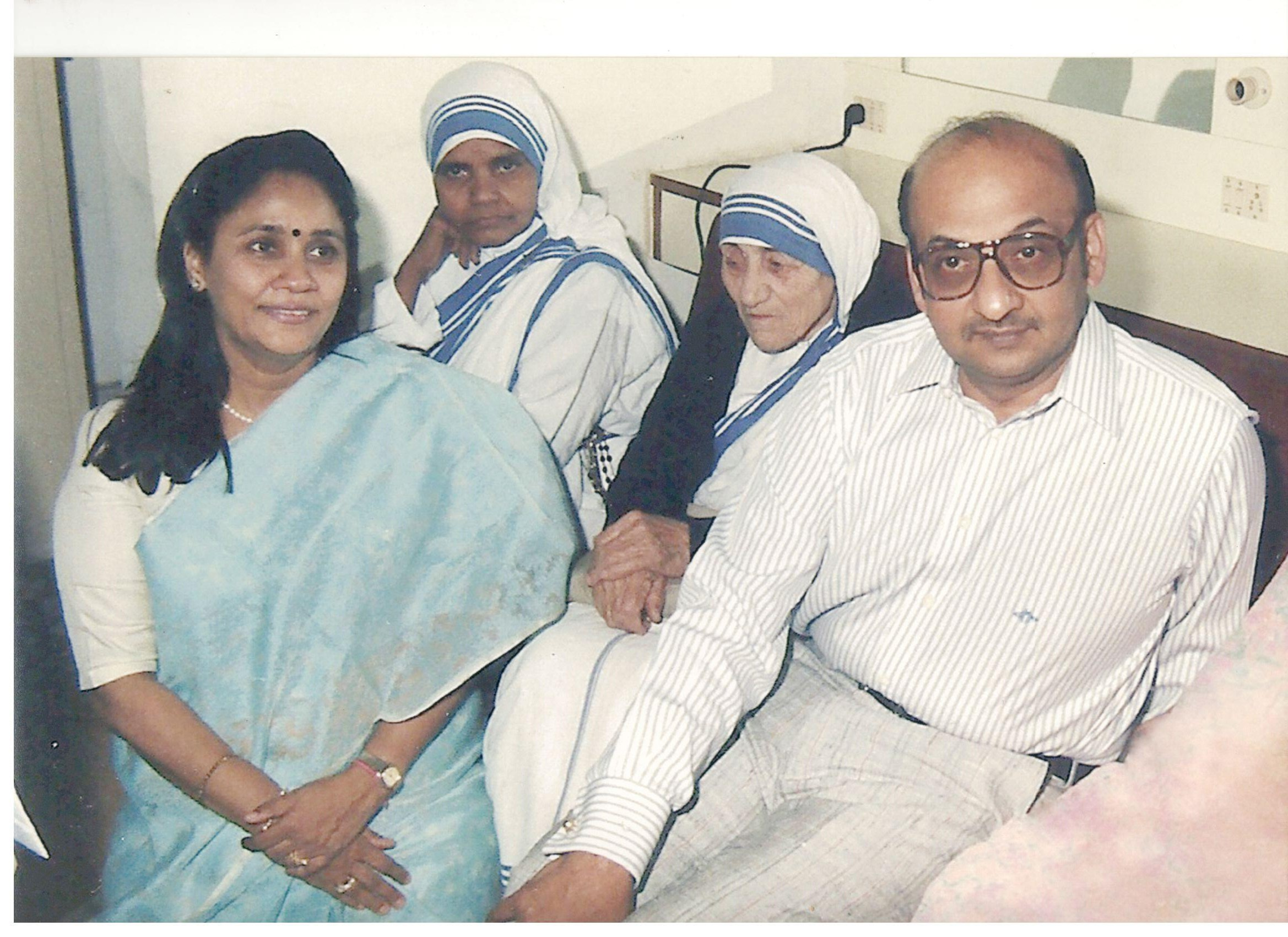
Mother Teresa and Ashwinbhai Mehta

Malini Kishor Sanghvi College of Commerce and Economics commenced in 1994 under Ritambhara Vishva Vidyapeeth with inspiration of former Chairperson Padma Bhushan Smt. Poornimaben Pakvasa, Didi of Dang Tribals. MKS is currently headed by President Shri Ashwinbhai Mehta, Managing Trustee Shri Umeshbhai Sanghvi and Executive Trustee Shri Apurvabhai Patel. Principal Dr Keshav Ghorude is leading the college.

A notable alumna of MKS College is the Indian actress Janvi Chheda.

== History ==
It received donations from businessmen and patrons Shri Kishorbhai Sanghvi, Late Shri Mafatlal Mehta, and support from ex-President Late Shri Dipchandbhai Gradi and ex-Managing Trustee Late Shri Haribhai Dresswala. Ritambhara Vishva Vidyapeeth has received Gujarati linguistic minority status and the college is affiliated to the University of Mumbai, on a permanent non-grant basis. Malini Kishor Sanghvi Degree and Junior College and M.Com (Management) has student strength of more than 5000. In its 21 years the college has not only grown immensely in student strength but has also diversified and added a repertoire of new course.

== J.V.P.D Campus ==
This trust acquired 12,000 sq. meters land in J.V.P.D Scheme, Vile Parle (West), Mumbai. Today it has educational activities with an English medium R.N. Shah High School (Established in 1990 with liberal donations from Shri Pravinbhai R. Shah in memory of his father) with current student strength of about 1800). Malini Kishor Sanghvi Junior College and Malini Kishor Sanghvi College of Commerce & Economics (Degree).

== Courses offered ==
From a beginning with 37 students in 1994, the Degree College today has more than 3000 students with B.Com and M.Com (Management) and six specialized courses – BMS, BAF, BBI, BMM, BFM & B.Sc (IT). The college is running an Add-on course in Tax Procedure & Practice (Certificate, Diploma & Advance Diploma). With the building for management institute, fast progressing, MMS and other additional courses will commence in the near future.

== See also ==
- List of Mumbai Colleges
