= Ruprekha Banerjee =

Fame Gurukul Finalist/singer

- Born: 28 July 1984 (age 42)

Ruprekha Banerjee (Bengali: রূপরেখা ব্যানার্জী) (born 28 July 1984 in Kolkata) is an Indian musician. She was one of the three finalists of Fame Gurukul, a popular television show in India, along with Rex D'Souza and Qazi Touqeer. On 20 October 2005, she won the top prize along with Touqeer.

Her debut album, Yeh Pal, with Qazi Touqeer, achieved Double Platinum in India and sold over 5 million copies worldwide. She also participated in a new reality show aired by Star Plus named Jo Jeeta Wohi Superstar and Royal Bengal Super Star by Star Jalsa.

== Early life ==
Ruprekha Banerjee was born on 28 July 1984 in Bongaon, North 24 Parganas district, West Bengal, India, to Bengali parents, Pradip Kr. Banerjee and Kabita Banerjee. She spent the first three months of her life in her birthplace in West Bengal, and then moved to Agarpara, Kolkata, where she lived with her businessman father. She spent her first eighteen years there and completed her schooling up to the tenth standard at Ramakrishna Mission, Barrackpore. She completed her 12th standard at Ariyadaha Sarbamangala Vidyapith, then attended Vidyasagar College, and finally graduated from the University of Calcutta with honours in zoology.

At the age of six, she began learning music, mainly Rabindra Sangeet, from her first Guru – her grandfather. She gave her first stage performance at their club's annual function. At the age of seven, she began formal training in Hindustani Classical Music. She learned Classical Hindustani Music from Sangeeta Das of Agarpara, Neela Goswami up to the age of 10, and Anju Chakraborty up to the age of 16. She learned light classical Hindustani music from Arun Bhaduri, which led to her initial exposure to Bengali film background songs and Bengali serial title songs. Later, she moved to Mumbai and received training in playback singing from Bharat Ratna Pandit and from Bhimsen Joshi's student, Maloy Banerjee. She continued her training in classical Hindustani music with Kanika Mitra, a student of the late Mira Bandhopadhya.

== Career ==
In 2005, she was declared the winner alongside Qazi Touqeer for the reality show Fame Gurukul the all India music competition, Mumbai, organized by Sony TV. Judges Javed Akhtar, KK, and Shankar Mahadevan evaluated her at various stages.

In 2006, she was selected for a special episode of Jo Jeeta Wohi Super Star being judged by Vishal Dadlani, Shekhar Ravijani and Farah Khan.

In 2007, she started recording in regional languages such as Bhojpuri, and Bengali. After Fame Gurukul, she has continuously worked and recorded songs with many music directors. She has recorded film songs not only in Bengali but also in Hindi, Bhojpuri, and Gujrati.

She worked with music directors including Bickram Ghosh, Ashok Bhadra, Shankar Mahadevan, Indrajit Dey, Nabin Chottopadhyay, Raju Mukherjee, Prosenjit Chatterjee, Arup Om, Joy Sarkar, Rupankar Bagchi, Goutam Ghosal, Indradeep Dasgupta, Subhadeep Chatterjee and Purbayan Chatterjee.

== Discography ==
- Yeh Pal
- Karoon Kya
- Hero
- Meri Mehbooba
- Kehkashan
- Maddham
- Meri Choodiyaan

Albums in Bengali:

- Bondhu Hobe... 2011 Puja album by Sagarika Super Hit...
- Electronic A Krishna she is performing with music directed by Indra
- Rabindra Sangeet album by Bickram Ghosh

== Personal life ==
In 2005, she moved to Mumbai with her family after being crowned the winner of Fame Gurukul.

She is married to Nalinakshya Bhattacharya and has a daughter, Sheerin Bhattacharya.

== Awards ==
She has won and been nominated for several awards. She received the "Fame Gurukul" Award for Most Promising Reality Show for Mast, the "Sera Bengali-2006" Award, and the "Sananda Adittiya" Award. Additionally, she won the Best Rising Singer Award at the 2012 Kalakar Awards, the Best Album Award in 2012, and the "Bharat Nirman Award" in 2013 for Best Rising Singer – Female. She was also nominated for "Bondhu Hobe."
