= Janvi Chheda =

Indian actress (born 1984)

Janvi Chheda Gopalia
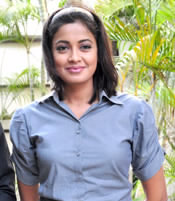
- Chheda in 2012
- Born: 29 February 1984 (age 42); Mumbai, Maharashtra, India
- Occupation: Actress
- Years active: 2005–present
- Known for: Chhoona Hai Aasmaan; Balika Vadhu; CID
- Spouse: Nishant Gopalia (m. 2011)
- Children: 1

Janvi Chheda Gopalia (née Chheda; born 29 February 1984) is an Indian actress who primarily works in Hindi television. Chheda made her acting debut in 2007 with Chhoona Hai Aasmaan portraying Sameera Singh. She is best known for her portrayal of Sugna Singh in Balika Vadhu and Inspector Shreya in CID, which earned her wider recognition.

== Early life ==
Chheda was born on 29 February 1984 and was brought up in Mumbai. She is a Gujarati whose native place is Mandvi, Kutch. Chheda completed her graduation from MKS Ritambhara, Mumbai.

== Career ==
=== Debut and breakthrough (2005–2011) ===
Chheda started her career with a play Dr. Mukta in Dubai. She made her film debut in 2005 with the Gujarati film Toh Lagi Sharat playing Sanjana and worked in Gujarati television as host in Kem Cho and as Nidhi in Saubhagyavati.

Chheda made her Hindi TV debut with Chhoona Hai Aasmaan portraying Flight Lieutenant Sameera Singh opposite Mohammed Iqbal Khan from 2007 to 2008. The show received praises for its storyline.

In 2009, she played the negative character of Sandhya in Dhoop Mein Thandi Chaav...Maa alongside Vineet Raina. She appeared as Simran in Maayka in 2009.

From 2010 to 2011, she portrayed the lead Tashi Arjun Singh alongside Karan Hukku and Kunal Verma in Tera Mujhse Hai Pehle Ka Naata Koi.

=== Success, hiatus and return to acting (2011–present) ===
From 2011 to 2013, she portrayed Sugna Shyam Singh opposite Sachin Shroff in Balika Vadhu, which proved as a major turning point in her career.

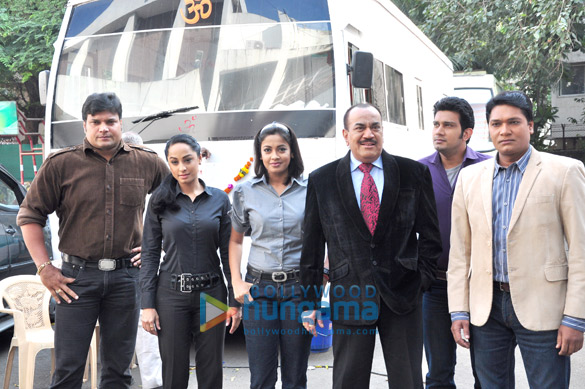
(From L-R) Dayanand Shetty, Ansha Sayed, Janvi Chheda, Shivaji Satam, Vineet Kumar Chaudhary and Aditya Srivastava on the sets of CID.

Chheda is widely known for her portrayal of Inspector Shreya in India's longest-running television police procedural CID. It earned her wider recognition. She portrayed the character from 2012 to 2016.

She also appeared as Shreya in the crossover episodes with Adaalat during CID Viruddh Adaalat in 2012 and CID V/s Adaalat – Karmyudh in 2014. CID also had crossover with Taarak Mehta Ka Ooltah Chashmah in 2014. She returned as Shreya in CID in 2018 for two episodes, which also marked her last screen appearance before she took a break from acting.

Following a seven year hiatus from acting, Chheda returned to television with CID 2, where she reprised her character of Shreya.

== Personal life ==
Chheda married her long-time boyfriend Nishant Gopalia in 2011. She gave birth to a daughter Nirvi in 2017. Post her marriage, Chheda changed her name to Janvi Chheda Gopalia.

== Filmography ==
=== Films ===
| Year | Title | Role | Notes | Ref. |
|---|---|---|---|---|
| 2005 | Toh Lagi Sharat | Sanjana | Gujarati film | |

=== Television ===
| Year | Title | Role | Notes | Ref. |
|---|---|---|---|---|
| 2007–2008 | Chhoona Hai Aasmaan | Flight Lieutenant Sameera Singh | | |
| 2009 | Dhoop Mein Thandi Chaav...Maa | Sandhya | | Banu me teri dulhan |
| 2009 | Maayka | Simran | | |
| 2010–2011 | Tera Mujhse Hai Pehle Ka Naata Koi | Tashi Singh | | |
| 2011–2013 | Balika Vadhu | Sugna Shyam Singh | | |
| 2012–2016; 2018; 2025 | CID | Inspector Shreya | | |
| 2012 | CID Viruddh Adaalat | Inspector Shreya | | |
| 2013 | CID – Chhote Heroes | Inspector Shreya | | |
| 2014 | Taarak Mehta Ka Ooltah Chashmah | Inspector Shreya | | |
| 2014 | CID V/s Adaalat – Karmyudh | Inspector Shreya | Telefilm | |

=== Theatre ===
| Year | Play | Role | Ref. |
|---|---|---|---|
| 2005 | Dr. Mukta in Dubai | Unknown | |

== See also ==
- List of Indian television actresses
- List of Hindi television actresses
