= Dhoop Mein Thandi Chaav...Maa =

Television series

- Promotional logo
- Created by: Shakuntalam Telefilms
- Directed by: Hemant Prabhu; Inder Das; Ismail Umar khan
- Starring: Chitrapama Banerjee; Vineet Raina; Amar Upadhyay; Janvi Chheda
- Opening theme: "Maa" by Mohit Chauhan
- Country of origin: India
- Original language: Hindi
- No. of episodes: 70

Production
- Producers: Neelima Bajpayi; Shyamashish Bhattacharya
- Running time: approximately 23 minutes

Original release
- Network: Zee TV
- Release: January 12 – April 17, 2009

Dhoop Mein Thandi Chaav ... Maa also known as Maa is a Hindi-language television series that aired on Zee TV channel. The series premiered on 12 January 2009 and aired every Monday to Friday at 7pm IST. The series concluded on 17 April 2009.

This series was once considered one of the best on Zee TV, however, it went off-air just three months after it started. Reasons to why the series was pulled was uncertain but, according to the cast, it was definitely not because of TRPs.

== Plot ==
The show is about Apara's tirade against society and her three children's suffering because they are separated from her safety.

Circumstances force Apara and her children to seek refuge in another house. The story shows how she overcomes the obstacles and tries to come out unscathed and unmarred, at the same time not letting go of her family's honor.

== Characters ==
=== Shekhar (age 43) ===
Shekhar is Apara's husband, Anay, Aditi and Tanmay's father and Akshar's elder brother. He was killed by his own younger cousin brother. He is now dead. (protagonist)

=== Apara (age 38) ===
Apara is Shekhar's wife, Anay, Aditi and Tanmay's mother and Akshar and Shandya's sister-in-law. (protagonist)

=== Akshar (age 29) ===
Akshar is Shekhar's younger cousin brother and Bua Ji's son. Uncle of Anay, Aditi and Tanmay. He killed his own elder cousin brother Shekhar because to have all wealth of Shekhar. He has now become a terrorist. (antagonist)

=== Sandhya (age 30) ===
Married to Rishi. Aunt of Anay, Aditi and Tanmay. She with Akshar is planning to ruin Apara's life. (antagonist)

=== Anay (age 8) ===
He is Shekhar and Apara's eldest son. (protagonist)

=== Aditi (age 8) ===
She is Shekhar and Apara's youngest daughter. (protagonist)

=== Tanmay (age 11) ===
He is Shekhar and Apara's son. (protagonist)

=== Kanta (age 24) ===
She is Sandhya's sister. She has a crush on Akshar and wants to marry him (used to be a minor antagonist).

=== Natasha (age 23) ===
Akshar's ex-girlfriend, hired by Akshar and Sandhya. (antagonist)

=== Bua Ji (age 61) ===
She is Akshar's mother and Shekhar's Buaji (protagonist).

=== Rishi (age 33) ===
Younger brother of Shekhar, he doesn't know that his wife is selfish and hates Apara. (protagonist)

== Cast ==
- Chitrapama Banerjee as Apara
- Amar Upadhyay as Shekhar
- Vineet Raina as Akshar
- Janvi Chheda as Sandhya
- Aadesh Chaudhary as Rishi
- Savita Prabhune as Bua Ji
- Ekta Sharma as Kanta
