= Neha Bhasin =

Indian singer (born 1982)

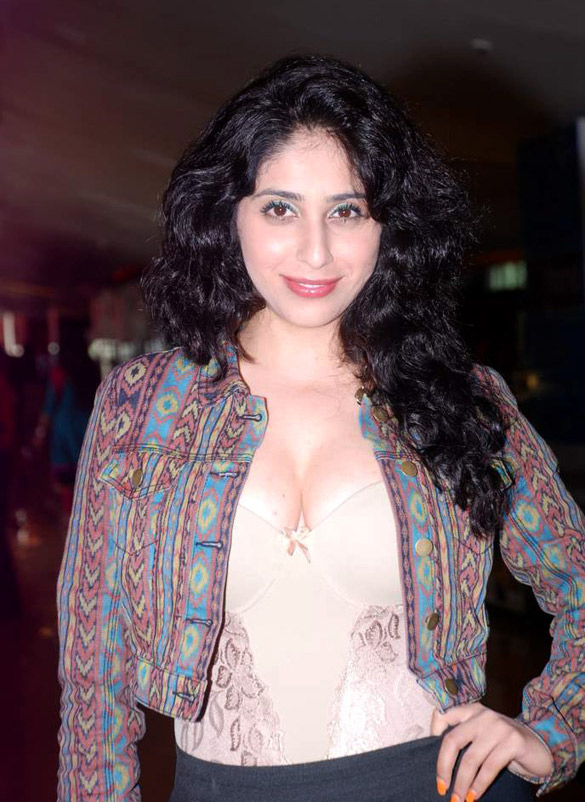
- Bhasin in 2018
- Born: 18 November 1982 (age 43); Delhi, India
- Occupations: Singer; songwriter
- Years active: 2005–present
- Spouse: Sameer Uddin (m. 2016)
- Awards: Full list
- Musical career
- Genres: Filmi; pop; Indian classical music; rock; Sufi; EDM
- Instrument: Vocals
- Labels: Times Music; Regional Music Centre; Universal Music India; T-Series; Tips; Sony Music India; Saregama

Neha Bhasin (born 18 November 1982) is an Indian playback singer, popstar, performer and songwriter. She is known for her playback work in Hindi, Telugu, Tamil cinemas and independent songs in the genre of Indian pop and Punjabi folk music. Bhasin has received seven Filmfare nominations across different languages and won two Filmfare Awards for her songs "Jag Ghoomeya" (Hindi) and "Paani Ravi Da" (Punjabi). In 2021, she participated in Bigg Boss OTT 1.

== Early life ==
Bhasin won her first singing competition after singing Mariah Carey's song Hero at the age of 9. Since her childhood, she aspired to become a popstar. She joined Shiamak Davar's dance academy to learn various dance forms. She also trained in classical singing from Ustad Ghulam Mustafa Khan.

Bhasin became an over-night sensation at age 18 when she was selected by Coke V popstars, a nationwide talent search conducted by Channel V to be a part of the 5-girl pop group Viva.

Bhasin studied at Kendriya Vidyalaya Sector 2 RK Puram New Delhi followed by The Frank Anthony Public School, New Delhi, and at Lady Shri Ram College, Delhi.

== Personal life ==
Neha Bhasin married Sameer Uddin, a music composer, in a western wedding in Tuscany, Italy on 23 October 2016.

== Career ==
Bhasin was attending the Lady Shri Ram College in Delhi when she auditioned for Channel V's Coke [V] Popstars in 2002. She went on to win the competition, with the winners forming India's first all-girls music group, Viva. Other members of the band were Seema Ramchandani, Pratichee Mohapatra (sister of Sona Mohapatra), Mahua Kamat and Anushka Manchanda.

After the band broke up in 2004, Bhasin went on to sing for Bollywood films and the Tamil film music industry.

Her first breakthrough in Bollywood was the song "Kuch Khass Hai" in 2007, for which she was nominated for the 2008 Filmfare Award. Bhasin's debut Tamil song "Pesugiren Pesugiren", composed by Yuvan Shankar Raja, won her the Vijay Award for Best Female Playback Singer in 2008. In the same year, she sang her debut Assamese song "Gaore Horu Horu Poduli" with Zubeen Garg, "Xirote Xendur" and "O Mama" with Krishnamoni Chutia and Banjyotshna in the Assamese film Junda Iman Gunda.

In 2021, she featured on Times Square billboard as artist of the month on Spotify for her song "Oot Patangi".

== Discography ==
=== Film songs ===
Year	Song	Film album	Language	Composer	Co-singer(s)
2005	"Bullet – Ek Dhamaka"	Bullet: Ek Dhamaka	Hindi	Somesh Mathur	
2006	"Ek Look Ek Look"	Aryan	Hindi	Anand Raj Anand	
2007	"I Wanna Rock Like Mummy Ji"	Mummy Ji	Hindi	Aadesh Shrivastava	
2007	"Kudiye Pataka"	Mummy Ji	Hindi	Aadesh Shrivastava	
2007	"Jashna Di Raat Ha"	Mummy Ji	Hindi	Aadesh Shrivastava	
2007	"Pesugiren Pesugiren"	Satham Podathey	Tamil	Yuvan Shankar Raja	
2007	"Sei Yethaavathu"	Billa	Tamil	Yuvan Shankar Raja	
2007	"Gaore Horu Horu Poduli"	Junda Iman Gunda	Assamese	Dr. Hitesh Baruah	Zubeen Garg, Jinti, Gargi
2007	"O Mama"	Junda Iman Gunda	Assamese	Dr. Hitesh Baruah	Krishnamoni Chutia, Banjyotsna
2007	"Xirote Xendur"	Junda Iman Gunda	Assamese	Dr. Hitesh Baruah	Zubeen Garg, Zublee, Gargi, Jinti, Jitul Sonowal, Krishnamoni Chutia
2008	"Hari Puttar"	Hari Puttar	Hindi	Aadesh Shrivastava	
2008	"Kuchh Khaas"	Fashion	Hindi	Salim–Sulaiman	Mohit Chauhan
2008	"Kuch Khaas" (Remix)	Fashion	Hindi	Salim–Sulaiman	Mohit Chauhan
2009	"Om Shanthi Om"	Muthirai	Tamil	Yuvan Shankar Raja	
2009	"Atu Nuvve Itu Nuvve"	Current	Telugu	Devi Sri Prasad	
2009	"Yogi Yogi Thaan"	Yogi	Tamil	Yuvan Shankar Raja	
2009	"Nasha"	Daddy Cool	Hindi	Gaurav Dayal	
2009		Kill Chabbra	Hindi	Raghav Sachar	
2009	"You and Me"	Pyaar Impossible	Hindi	Salim–Sulaiman	
2011	"Are Dhammare"	Maharaja	Tamil	D. Imman	
2011	"Poraney Poraney"	Vaagai Sooda Vaa	Tamil	M. Ghibran	
2011	"Dhunki"	Mere Brother Ki Dulhan	Hindi	Sohail Sen	
2011	"Hello Hello"	Dhada	Telugu	Devi Sri Prasad	
2011	"Niharika"	Oosaravelli	Telugu	Devi Sri Prasad	
2011	"Dil Ki Hai Tamanna"	Force	Hindi	Harris Jayaraj	
2011	"I Wanna Rock Like Mummy Ji"	Mummy Punjabi	Punjabi	Aadesh Shrivastava	Richa Sharma
2011	"Kudiye Pataka"	Mummy Punjabi	Punjabi	Aadesh Shrivastava	Aadesh Shrivastava
2011	"Jashna Di Raat Hai"	Mummy Punjabi	Punjabi	Aadesh Shrivastava	Gurdas Mann
2012	"Kaadhal Endhan Kaadhal"	Moondru Per Moondru Kaadhal	Tamil	Yuvan Shankar Raja	
2012	"Tha Tha Thamara"	Nuvva Nena	Telugu	Bheems Ceciroleo	
2014	"Aww Tuzo Mogh Korta"	1: Nenokkadine	Telugu	Devi Sri Prasad	
2014	"Asalaam-e-Ishqum"	Gunday	Hindi	Sohail Sen	Bappi Lahiri
2016	"Aakhein Milayenge Darr Se"	Neerja	Hindi	Vishal Khurana	
2016	"Jag Ghoomeya (Female)"	Sultan	Hindi	Vishal–Shekhar	
2016	" Apple Beauty"	Janatha Garage	Telugu	Devi Sri Prasad	
2017	" Kaadhal Veesi"	Indrajith (2017 film)	Tamil	KP	
2017	"Paani Ravi Da"	Lahoriye	Punjabi	Jatinder Shah	
2017	"Swing Zara"	Jai Lava Kusa	Telugu	Devi Sri Prasad	
2017	"Swag Se Swagat"	Tiger Zinda Hai	Hindi	Vishal–Shekhar	Vishal Dadlani
2017	"Dil Diyan Gallan" (Unplugged)	Tiger Zinda Hai	Hindi	Vishal–Shekhar	
2018	"Kaala Doreya"	Kaalakaandi	Hindi	Sameer Uddin	
2018	"Shuru Kar"	Aiyaary	Hindi	Rochak Kohli	Amit Mishra
2018	"Heeriye"	Race 3	Hindi	Meet Bros	Deep Money
2018	"Swag Saha Nahi Jaaye"	Happy Phirr Bhag Jayegi	Hindi	Sohail Sen	Shahdab Faridi, Shivangi Bhanaya, Sohail Sen
2019	"Chashni"	Bharat	Hindi	Vishal–Shekhar	
2022	"Catch Me"	Khiladi	Telugu	Devi Sri Prasad	Jaspreet Jasz
2023	"Lets Dance Chotu Motu"	Kisi Ka Bhai Kisi Ki Jaan	Hindi	Devi Sri Prasad	Salman Khan, Yo Yo Honey Singh, Devi Sri Prasad
2024	"Rang Ishq Ka (Redux)"	Bade Miyan Chote Miyan	Hindi	Vishal Mishra	

=== Non-film songs ===
Year	Album Title	Song(s)	Language	Composer	Co-singer(s)
2002	Viva!	All Songs	Hindi	Shankar-Ehsaan-Loy, Lesle Lewis, Sandeep Chowta, Raju Singh	
2003	Viva! Reloaded	All Songs	Hindi		
2007	Prithibir Rong	"Mone"	Assamese	Alaap Dudul Saikia	—N/a

=== International collaborations ===
- Neha collaborated with Malaysian Hip Hop star Emcee Jesz for the song "THANIYE". The song has over 300,000 views on YouTube alone. It was also nominated for "Best Collaboration" at the RADIO RAGA AWARDS in Malaysia (2008–09).

== Filmography ==
- Bhasin made her acting debut starring in the film Life Ki Toh Lag Gayi. She starred alongside Kay Kay Menon and Ranvir Shorey in the movie which released in 2012.
- Neha hosted Sa Re Ga Ma Hungama on Zee Music in 2008 (backstage hosting).
- Neha played the role of an anchor and judge on the musical reality show Sitaaron Ko Choona Hai that aired on Real TV.
- Neha was a wildcard entry on Jhalak Dikhla Jaa Season 5.
- Neha was a contestant on Bigg Boss OTT in 2021 and got evicted on Day 39.
- Neha was a wildcard contestant on Bigg Boss 15 in 2021. She entered on Day 35 and was evicted on Day 55.

=== Television ===
Year	Show	Role	Notes
2002	Coke [V] Popstars	Contestant	1st Place
2008	Sa Re Ga Ma Hungama	Backstage Host	
2009	Sitaron Ko Choona Hai	Judge/Host	
2012	Jhalak Dikhhla Jaa 5	Contestant	Not selected
2017	Oye Firangi	Guest	
2018	Entertainment Ki Raat	Guest	
2019	The Kapil Sharma Show	Guest	
2021	Indian Pro Music League	Guest	
2021	Bigg Boss OTT	Contestant	6th place
2021	Bigg Boss 15	Contestant	13th place
2022	The Khatra Khatra Show	Guest	

== Awards ==
Year	Award	Category	Song and Film	Result
2002	Channel V Music Awards	Best Indian Pop Music Video	"Hum Naye Geet Sunaye" from Viva	Nominated
2007	Vijay TV Awards	Best Playback Singer – Female	Pesugiren Pesugiren (Satham Podathey) – Tamil	Won
2008	Filmfare Awards	Best Playback Singer – Female	Kuch Khaas Hai (Fashion)	Nominated
2009	Music Mirchi Awards South Awards	Best Playback Singer – Female	Atu Nuvve (Current) – Telugu	Nominated
2011	Stardust Awards	Musical Sensation of the Year	Dhunki (Mere Brother Ki Dulhan)	Won
2011	Screen Awards	Best Playback Singer – Female	Dhunki (Mere Brother Ki Dulhan)	Nominated
2011	Apsara Awards	Best Playback Singer – Female	Dhunki (Mere Brother Ki Dulhan)	Nominated
2011	Zee Cine Awards	Best Playback Singer – Female	Dhunki (Mere Brother Ki Dulhan)	Nominated
2011	People's Choice Awards	Best Playback Singer – Female	Dhunki (Mere Brother Ki Dulhan)	Nominated
2011	Filmfare Awards South	Best Playback Singer – Female	Poraney Poraney (VAAGAI SOODA VA) – Tamil	Nominated
2011	Filmfare Awards South	Best Female Playback Singer – Telugu	Hello Hello (Dhada) – Telugu	Nominated
2011	Music Mirchi Awards South	Best Playback Singer – Female	Hello Hello (Dhada) – Telugu	Nominated
2011	Mirchi Music Awards	Female Vocalist of The Year	Dhunki (Mere Brother Ki Dulhan)	Nominated
2014	South Indian International Movie Awards	Best Female Playback Singer (Telugu)	Aww Tuzo Mogh Kortha (1 Nenokkadine) – Telugu	Won
2016	Stardust Awards	Best Playback Singer – Female	Jag Ghoomeya (Sultan) – Hindi	Won
2016	Mirchi Music Awards	Female Vocalist of The Year	Jag Ghoomeya (Sultan) – Hindi	Nominated
2017	Filmfare Awards	good neha	Jag Ghoomeya (Sultan) – Hindi	Won
2017	ZeeCine Awards	good neha	Jag Ghoomeya (Sultan) – Hindi	Won
2017	Femina Women Awards	Femina Women Jury Award in the Music and Performing Arts	Jag Ghoomeya (Sultan) – Hindi	Won
2018	Filmfare Awards South	Best Female Playback Singer – Telugu	Swing Zara (Jai Lava Kusa) – Telugu	Nominated
2018	Filmfare Awards	Best Female Playback Singer – Punjabi	Paani Ravi Da (Lahoriye) – Punjabi	Won
2020	Filmfare Awards	Best Playback Singer – Female	Chashni (Reprise) (Bharat) – Hindi	Nominated
