= Naya Roop Nayi Zindagi =

- The promotional logo image of Naya Roop Nayi Zindagi.
- Created by: Howard Schultz in association with Disney-ABC International Television Ltd
- Directed by: Bimal Unnikrishnan
- Presented by: Mona Singh
- Opening theme: "Naya Roop Nayi Zindagi," music: Raju Singh, singer: Shaan, lyrics: Sandeep Srivastava
- Country of origin: India
- No. of episodes: 10

Production
- Producer: Miditech Pvt. Ltd
- Running time: approximately 52 minutes

Original release
- Network: Sony TV
- Release: 1 May – 3 July 2008

Naya Roop Nayi Zindagi (transl. New look, New life) is a reality television show that aired on Sony TV, from May 1, 2008 to July 3, 2008. The show was an Indian version of the American show Extreme Makeover. It is anchored by Mona Singh, popularly known as Jassi.

== Concept ==
The 10-week reality show consists of 10 candidates who undergo facial correction surgeries — reconstructive and cosmetic, dental and eye surgeries combined with fitness, diet and styling. Each story is about the skin deep transformation and a completely new change in life. It is a journey equivalent to getting a new life, from styling to fitness and counseling to dream fulfillment. In the 10 weeks ordinary people, through the medium of TV, meet extraordinary experts who work with them to help them reach their full physical and emotional potential.

Naya Roop Nayi Zindagi was directed by Bimal Unnikrishnan for Miditech on behalf of Sony Entertainment Television. The script narrator was Rajiv Pandey.
