= Fame Gurukul =

2005 Indian TV Show

- Genre: Reality television
- Presented by: Manav Gohil, Mandira Bedi
- Judges: Javed Akhtar; Shankar Mahadevan; Krishnakumar Kunnath(KK)
- Country of origin: India
- Original language: Hindi
- No. of seasons: 1

Production
- Executive producer: Supavitra Babul
- Editor: Umma Mishrra
- Camera setup: Multi-camera
- Production company: Miditech

Original release
- Network: Sony Entertainment Television
- Release: 27 June – 20 October 2005

Fame Gurukul is an Indian reality show on Sony Entertainment Television which premiered on 27 June 2005. The program was produced by the same production house of Indian Idol. The concept of the show was to select a pair of India's best singers/performers.

It is based on the Spanish Operación Triunfo and international Star Academy format of Endemol, better known in English under the British title Fame Academy. Fame Gurukul started out with 16 contestants living in a musical performance academy (Gurukul). Every week (normally) one contestant was voted out of the show, and so on until two remained in the end.

== Prizes ==
The winners received Rs 50 Lakhs, a Sony music contract in addition to a Maruti Alto car each.

== Season one ==
=== Contestants ===
- Qazi Touqeer (Winner)
- Ruprekha Banerjee (Winner)
- Rex D'Souza (Runner Up)
- Arpita Mukherjee
- Sandeep Batraa
- Arjit Singh
- Monica Gadgil
- Shamit Tyagi
- Keerthi Sagathia
- Mona Bhatt
- Ravi Tripathi
- Anubhav Suman
- Gurpreet Kaur
- Amit Jadhav
- Chhavi Sodhani
- Deepshikha Sharma
- Deepak Singh Meher

=== Faculty ===
==== Head Mistress ====
- Ila Arun

==== Music ====
- Padma Wadkar
- Prasant A Samadhar

==== Dance ====
- Caesar Gonsalves

==== Fitness ====
- Deepika Mehta

=== Judges ===
==== Jury Members ====
- Javed Akhtar - Lyricist / Screenplay writer / Poet
- KK (Krishnakumar Kunnath) - Singer
- Shankar Mahadevan - Singer / Composer

==== Celebrity Judges ====
Occasionally a celebrity judge was called on the show to comment on the performances and to inspire the singers. The following was a list of special judges who appeared on Fame Gurukul:

- Karan Johar
- Bipasha Basu and John Abraham
- Diya Mirza
- Anil Kapoor
- Alka Yagnik
- Madhavan
- Shreya Ghoshal
- Alisha Chinoy
- Aftab Shivdasani
- Bhumika Chawla
- Sarika
- Neha Dhupia

=== Presenters ===
- Mandira Bedi
- Manav Gohil

=== TV Production ===
- Manav Dhanda - Creative Director & Project Head
- Anupama Mandloi - Executive Producer, Sony Entertainment Television India
- Paul Coueslant - Consultant Executive Producer, Endemol International
- Nikhil Alva - Series Producer, Miditech

=== Results ===
On 20 October 2005, the final show of Fame Gurukul was broadcast in which the final three contestants - Qazi Touqeer, Rex D'Souza and Ruprekha Banerjee battled it for the top spots. After much waiting and various shows in between, the results were finally announced. Qazi Touqeer, the favourite was one of the winners, while Ruprekha Banerjee made up the pair with him.

== Celebrity Fame Gurukul ==
After season 1 of Fame Gurukul, Sony Entertainment Television launched Celebrity Fame Gurukul based on the successful reality show called 'Comic Relief Does Fame Academy' which was a spin-off on 'Fame Academy' produced by the format owner Gestmusic, part of the Endemol Group. The proceeds of the show would go to the Make a Wish Foundation, a non-profit organization dedicated to granting the most cherished wishes of children living with life-threatening illnesses.

== See also ==
- Fame Gurukul contestants
