= Ajay Monga =

Indian scriptwriter and film director (born 1968)

- Born: Mumbai
- Occupations: scriptwriter, film director
- Years active: 1996–present

Ajay Monga is an Indian scriptwriter and film director. He has written films like Corporate which starred Bipasha Basu and Kay Kay Menon and Fashion both directed by Madhur Bhandarkar.

He has also written a supernatural thriller Flat! which was released in 2010.

He completed his debut feature film Padduram as a writer-director. Ajay wrote the story, screenplay and dialogues of the web-series 'The Whistleblower' which is available to watch on Sony Liv, an OTT platform.

== Early life and education ==
Monga has done his schooling from St. Anne's High School, Orlem Malad ...He did his graduation from Jai Hind College Churchgate. He has done his Advertising & Marketing Management subsequently from Xavier's Institute of Communications Mumbai.

In school as well as in college Monga was associated with various cultural societies and groups. After college he was a part of Ekjute a theatre group run by Nadira Babbar.

== Career ==
Monga started his career as a copywriter with an advertising agency ADVIEWS. He later became the business development head of the company and diversified into Marketing & Management Consultancy. His equity research outfit Profiles & Projections serviced foreign institutional investors on behalf of leading broking houses.

Eventually he branched out into television and films as a writer, producer and director.

Monga has also conceived and designed a non-academic platform for kids 'Chhoton Ka Funda'.

== Filmography ==
=== Writer ===
- Flat!
- Fashion
- Corporate
- Padduram
- The Whistleblower (Web Series)

=== Creative Producer ===
- Bas Ek Pal

=== Director ===
- Barabar (Equal) (Short Feature)
- Padduram

== Nominations ==
- Star Screen 2008 - Best story Fashion (Nom.)
- Filmfare 2008 - Best Screenplay Fashion (Nom.)
- Cine Blitz 2008 Best Story Fashion (Nom.)
- IIFA 2009 - Best Story

== Books ==
- Skin Deep - A novel which he has authored released by Rupa Publications. A narrative born out of deep research and innumerable personal encounters Skin Deep sheds light on the challenges, pressures and hidden truths that encompass the quest for beauty and validation. It exposes the dark underbelly of the beauty pageant business.

=== Television Foray ===
Monga's television foray Ad Mad Show was a comedy show which was aired in 1996 on Zee TV - (List of programs broadcast by Zee TV). The show found maximum acceptability amongst college kids who started experimenting with the wacky concept of ad-mad games in schools & colleges.

== Copyright infringement claim ==
Monga has filed a copyright infringement case on Red Chillies Entertainment for the story screenplay of Om Shanti Om.
