= Wheels (TV series) =

Wheels is a weekly car and motorbike program on BBC World News India. It is produced in Delhi by Miditech Television.

At its launch in 1998, it was hosted by Niret Alva. Niret won the 2002 'Best Current Affairs or Infotainment Programme Presenter' at the Asian Television Awards for this role. Niret and his brother own 25% of Miditech Television. The Series Producer was Chandramouli Basu.

It was co-hosted by Navaz Sandhu who looked at car prototypes, Avinash Kumar Singh who reviewed bikes, and Christopher Daruwalla who hosted an infotainment section.

On 2 October 2004, the show was relaunched. It now opens with "Grapevine", a motoring news segment. This is followed with a car review section with Yudhishtir Urs and Sonam Kalra. This is followed with "Kick Start", a motorbike segment with Neeraj Chinappa and professional hill biker Sherry.

The show finishes with "Forum" a viewer input session, hosted by Shabri Malik.

Wheels holds an annual "Wheels Awards", with a "Wheels Viewers Choice Award" for both cars and bikes, and a "Wheels Car of the Year", "Wheels Bike of the Year" and various fun awards.
