= Sitaron Ko Choona Hai =

- Promotional logo
- Created by: Miditech
- Country of origin: India
- Original language: Hindi

Production
- Running time: 24 minutes

Original release
- Network: Real TV
- Release: 9 March 2009

Sitaron Ko Choona Hai is a reality show that aired on Real TV and premiered on 9 March 2009.

== The Faculty ==
The Academy is headed by Raghu Ram who has also been involved in MTV Roadies. Accompanying Raghu are singer and performer, Neha Bhasin of the Viva fame and voice coach Prashant Samadhar.

- Raghu Ram
- Neha Bhasin - Neha is a trained classical singer, songwriter and dancer. Having won many awards for playback singing and live performances, Neha brings to the show her vast experience of grooming the contestants into attractive stage performers.
- Prashant A Samadhar

Contestants

- Yashraj Kapil - Yashraj Kapil is the winner of this show
- Wajahat Hasan - Wajahat Hasan is Delhi Based Classical Singer.
- Sreeju Premarajan - Sreeju Premarajan is Delhi Based Singer who was also one of the Finalists of Indian Idol - Season 3.
