= Chhoona Hai Aasmaan =

2007 Indian TV series

- Directed by: Pavan Kaul
- Starring: see below
- Opening theme: "Chhoona Hai Aasmaan" by Shibani Kashyap
- Country of origin: India
- No. of seasons: 1
- No. of episodes: 156

Production
- Producers: Nikhil Alva, Mafuz A. Laskar
- Running time: 22 minutes
- Production company: Miditech Pvt. Ltd.

Original release
- Network: STAR One
- Release: 15 October 2007 – 10 July 2008

Chhoona Hai Aasmaan (transl. Touch the Sky) is a Hindi television serial that aired on Star One. It is about six Indian air force officers who form a team called the HAWKS. Their duty is to save the country from terrorist attacks.

== Cast ==
- Mohammed Iqbal Khan as Flight Lieutenant / Wing Commander Abhimanyu Adhikari (2007–2008)
- Nikhil Arya as Flight Lieutenant / Wing Commander Abhimanyu Adhikari (2008)
- Janvi Chheda as Flight Lieutenant Sameera Singh
- Manish Paul as Flight Lieutenant Farhaan Zaidi
- Vaani Sharma as Flight Lieutenant Tanvi Sharma
- Vivan Bhatena as Flight Lieutenant Samrat Singh Shekhawat / Jahan Sheikh
- Aparna Kumar as Flight Lieutenant Isha Oberoi
- Dalljiet Kaur as Shikha Singh
- Narendra Jha as Group Captain Aryaveer Pratap Singh
- Vaishnavi Mahant as Sapna Singh
- Payal Nair as Sunaina Aryaveer Pratap Singh
- Shakti Singh as Defense Minister Upadhyay
- Adita Wahi as Shaheen
- Vishal Watwani as Terrorist
- Abhinav Kohli as Flight Lieutenant Sameer Singh
- Tuhina Vohra as Veena Adhikari
- Lalit Tiwari as Hyder Sheikh
- Hunar Hali as Rashi Upadhyay / Nisha
- Amit Behl as Group Captain Karan Trivedi
- Sanjeev Seth as Senior Air Force Officer
- Dinesh Mehta as Air Force Officer
- Ashok Lokhande as Nasir Khan
- Kunal Bakshi as Terrorist
- Shailesh Gulabani as Rocky
- Goga Kapoor as Rahim
- Jayshree T. as Pragya Ujjwal Upadhyay
- Vineet Sharma as Aftab Sheikh
- Omar Vani as Krish Mehra
- Nitika Anand as Nishita
- Parth Mehrotra as Mannu
- Madan Joshi as Mr. Singh
- Nandita Thakur as Mrs. Singh
- Ahmed Khan as Mr. Adhikari
- Gulshan Pandey as Mr. Thapar

=== Special appearance ===
- Minissha Lamba as Kavya.
