= Lesle Lewis =

Lesle Lewis may refer to:

- Lesle Lewis (composer) (born 1960), Indian singer and composer
- Lesle Lewis (author), American poet and professor

== See also ==
- Leslie Lewis
