= Qazi Touqeer =

Indian Actor

- Qazi in 2026

Background information
- Born: Qazi Ahmad Touqeer; 4 June 1986 (age 40); Srinagar, J&K, India
- Genres: Pop; pop rock; electronic; dance
- Occupations: Singer; actor; youtuber
- Years active: 2005–present
- Label: Sony BMG

Qazi Ahmad Touqeer (born 4 June 1986) is an Indian singer, television personality, and an occasional actor who won the show Fame Gurukul – along with Ruprekha Banerjee. He sings in the Kashmiri, Hindi, Urdu and English languages. He is currently in the Bigg Boss 20 house.

== Early life ==
Qazi Ahmad Touqeer was born on 4 June 1986, in Srinagar, Kashmir, into a Kashmiri Muslim family to Mushtaq Ahmad Qazi, a lawyer who later embraced Sufism, and Syeda Rukhsana, a school teacher. His uncle is Qazi Rafi, a well-known Kashmiri singer. Touqeer also has a younger brother named Qazi Touseef, an entrepreneur.

== Career ==
In 2005, Qazi Touqeer won the first season of the show Fame Gurukul, India's version of Fame Academy, along with Ruprekha Banerjee. During the finale, he received 2.5 crore paid SMS votes, which was reported to be the highest number of votes received for a contestant on Indian Television.

The President of India, in regards to Qazi Touqeer, declared him to be the hero of Kashmir. As a result of Qazi's success, a plethora of Kashmiri youth auditioned in Indian Idol tryouts, which were held in Srinagar, a city in the Kashmir Valley.

Later that year, he released a new album along with Ruprekha Banerjee titled "Yeh Pal". In 2008, He injured himself while rehearsing for his acting debut film, Take Off. Qazi was rehearsing at Ganesh Acharya Studios when he fell down and injured his neck.

In September 2026, Touqeer entered the twentieth season of the Hindi-language reality television show Bigg Boss as a contestant. His participation marked his return to mainstream television nearly two decades after he won the singing reality show Fame Gurukul in 2005. During his time on Bigg Boss 20, Touqeer attracted attention for his interactions and activities in the house, including a prank that was later addressed by host Salman Khan.

20 years after winning Fame Gurukul, he returned to the spotlight through Bigg Boss.

== Discography ==
=== Albums ===
Album Information	Official Singles
Yeh Pal (as Yeh Pal): Released: 1 January 2006 (India); Label: Sony BMG; Peak India Billboard: 1; India sales: 2,354,353; RIAA certification: 2× platinum	2005: "Yeh Pal"; 2005: "Karu Kya"; 2005: "Hero"; 2005: "Meri Mehbooba"; 2005: "Yeh Pal-Remix"; 2005: "Madham Si Chandani"; 2005: "Kehkashan"ha

== Filmography ==
=== Films ===
Year	Title	Notes
2009	Take Off	(Shelved film)
2015	Phantom	Guest appearance in the song "Afghan Jalebi"

=== Television ===
Year	Title	Role	Notes	Ref(s)
2005	Fame Gurukul	Contestant	Winner	
2009	Sarkaar Ki Duniya	Contestant		
2026	Bigg Boss Season 20	Contestant		
