= Lesley Lewis (script editor) =

Lesley Lewis is an Australian writer, researcher and script editor who has worked extensively in television.

== Select filmography ==
- A Country Practice
- Water Rats – researcher, script editor
- Murder Call – trainee script editor, script editor
- All Saints – script editor
- McLeod's Daughters – associate script producer
- Out of the Blue (2008) – associate script producer
- Cops LAC – writer
- Home and Away – associate story producer
- Neighbours (2011 – 2014) – writer, associate story producer, story producer
- Wonderland - associate story producer
