= Leslie Lewis =

Leslie Lewis may refer to:

- Leslie Lewis (sprinter) (1924–1986), British sprinter
- Leslie Lewis (marathon runner) (born 1955), American marathon runner
- Leslie Lewis (composer) (born 1960), Indian singer and composer

== See also ==
- Lesle Lewis (disambiguation)
