= Niret Alva =

Indian television producer

- Born: Bengaluru
- Occupations: Co-founder and Chairman [Miditech ]
- Years active: 1988 – present
- Known for: Producer, Anchor and Media Educator
- Spouse: Anuja Chauhan
- Children: 3
- Parent(s): Margaret Alva, Niranjan Alva

Niret Alva is an Indian television producer who co-founded television production company Miditech Studios along with his brother Nikhil Alva.

Miditech Studios first made a documentary series on the environment, Living on the Edge for Doordarshan, that won a Panda Award more familiarly known as the Green Oscar. They also went on to make documentaries for the BBC, Discovery, Channel News Asia, ITV and National Geographic, before entering the entertainment genre around 2004, with MTV Roadies (2003), Indian Idol (2004–2009), Galli Galli Sim Sim (Sesame Street) (2006), and Wheels (1998) (BBC World).

== Early life and education ==
Niret Alva was born in Bangalore – the first child of lawyers Niranjan and Margaret Alva. Alva has two brothers, Nikhil Alva and Nivedith Alva, and a sister, Manira Alva Pinto. His name is a portmanteau, wherein the first two letters are from his father Niranjan, and the last three from his mother, Margaret Alva. The family moved to Delhi in 1974 when his mother was elected to the Rajya Sabha (the upper house of India's parliament). She went on to serve as minister of state in Rajiv Gandhi and Narasimha Rao's governments. A prominent parliamentarian, she served four consecutive terms in the Rajya Sabha and one in the Lok Sabha.

Alva is a graduate in history from St. Stephen's College, Delhi, has a post graduate diploma in journalism from the Indian Institute of Mass Communication (IIMC), Delhi, and is a recipient of a certificate from the Radio Netherlands Training Centre in Hilversum (Holland) for a news and current affairs course in television. He earned a law degree (LLB) from Mumbai University.

== Career ==
Niret joined the Press Trust of India, television, as a trainee reporter/scriptwriter in January 1988. Beginning his career when television was still government-controlled in the late 1980s, he moved on to become a correspondent with Eyewitness, a monthly independent video news magazine, owned by Hindustan Times Television in 1990. He covered subjects such as Indian attitudes toward sex, caste violence, the dangers of the civilian use of the army and the capture of Rajiv Gandhi's assassin.

In 1992, he co-founded Miditech Studios, a television software production company, along with his brother Nikhil Alva. Miditech Studios conservation and sustainability series, Living on the Edge won a Panda award, familiarly known as the Green Oscar, at Wildscreen in Bristol in 1996.

Niret has scripted, directed and been associated with several international, award winning documentaries, including The Great Descent – a river rafting journey down the Brahmaputra after the massive flood of 2000, and Operation Hot Pursuit – an undercover documentary on the illegal ivory trade between India and Japan.

Alva teaches a media and communications course at Srishti Manipal University in Bengaluru.

== Awards ==
- National Award for 'Outstanding Effort in Science and Technology in the Electronic Medium', awarded by President APJ Abdul Kalam.
- Wildscreen Panda Award, better known as the Green Oscar, for Living On The Edge.
- Asian Television Award for best Anchor in an Information Based series for Wheels on BBC world. In 2019, Niret and Nikhil Alva and their production house Miditech was inducted into the Indian television Hall of Fame.

== Personal life ==
Alva is married to Indian author and advertising executive Anuja Chauhan author of The Zoya Factor (2008) and five other best selling novels. They first met in 1989, during the production of a play in Delhi. They were married in 1994. They have three children, two girls and a boy.

== Filmography ==
Television
Title	Year	Role
Wheels (TV series)	1998	Host/Executive Producer
Indian Idol (Reality-singing competition)	(2004–2009)	Executive Producer
Galli Galli Sim Sim	2006	Executive Producer
Parrivaar (TV series)	( 2007–2008)	Executive Producer
