= Fashion (2008 film) =

2008 Indian film by Madhur Bhandarkar

- Theatrical release poster
- Directed by: Madhur Bhandarkar
- Written by: Ajay Monga; Madhur Bhandarkar; Anuraadha Tewari
- Produced by: Ronnie Screwvala
- Starring: Priyanka Chopra; Kangana Ranaut; Mugdha Godse; Arjan Bajwa; Samir Soni; Arbaaz Khan
- Narrated by: Priyanka Chopra
- Cinematography: Mahesh Limaye
- Edited by: Devendra Murdeshwar
- Music by: Salim–Sulaiman
- Distributed by: UTV Motion Pictures; Bhandarkar Entertainment
- Release date: 29 October 2008
- Running time: 165 minutes
- Country: India
- Language: Hindi
- Budget: ₹20 crore
- Box office: ₹39.29 crore

Fashion is a 2008 Indian Hindi-language drama film co-written and directed by Madhur Bhandarkar. The film stars Priyanka Chopra, Kangana Ranaut and Mugdha Godse in lead roles, with Arjan Bajwa, Samir Soni and Arbaaz Khan in supporting roles. Principal photography took place in Mumbai and Chandigarh. The film's soundtrack was composed by Salim–Sulaiman, with lyrics written by Irfan Siddiqui and Sandeep Nath.

The story revolves around Meghna Mathur, an aspiring fashion model; it follows her transformation from small-town girl to supermodel, the Indian fashion industry and the careers of several other models. Fashion also explores feminism and female power in Indian fashion. The cast also features several professional fashion models playing themselves.

Fashion was released on 29 October 2008 and received critical acclaim, with praise for its direction, screenplay, cinematography, soundtrack and cast performances, particularly towards Chopra's and Ranaut's. It was a moderate success at the box-office, grossing ₹39.2945 crore (US$4.1 million) worldwide. The film was also a turning point in Chopra's career after several consecutive flops prior to this film.

At the 56th National Film Awards, Fashion won 2 awards – Best Actress (Chopra) and Best Supporting Actress (Ranaut). At the 54th Filmfare Awards, the film received 7 nominations including Best Director (Bhandarkar) and Best Female Debut (Godse) and won 2 awards – Best Actress (Chopra) and Best Supporting Actress (Ranaut). Since its release, The Times of India and Zee News have listed Fashion as one of the best women-centric films in Bollywood.

== Plot ==
Aspiring model Meghna Mathur wants to go to Mumbai and become a supermodel. Against her father's wishes, who wants her to become a chartered accountant, Meghna leaves her home to find success in the modelling world. Meghna meets an old acquaintance, Rohit—an aspiring designer who assists Vinay Khosla. Meghna experiences difficulties during her early days; she auditions several times and is rejected. Meghna meets and befriends another struggling model, Manav.

At Rahul Arora's fashion show, Meghna meets supermodel Shonali Gujral and is ridiculed by the show's choreographer, Christine, and told to have her portfolio photographed by Kartik. To afford Kartik's fees, Meghna shoots a lingerie advertisement; she is mentored by another aspiring model, Janet. Meghna's lingerie photos appear on the cover of a magazine; her relatives in Mumbai see the cover and ask her to leave the house. She moves into an apartment with Manav. Meghna is noticed by Anisha Roy, an executive at Panache, a major modeling agency. Anisha introduces her to her superior, Abhijit Sarin, who is impressed by Meghna's ambition and confidence. Panache's top model is Shonali, but her drug abuse becomes problematic. Abhijit includes Meghna in a fashion show organized by Vinay Khosla but is replaced after a misunderstanding. Abhijit consoles her and decides to replace Shonali with Meghna as Panache's new top model.

Meghna becomes an overnight success, ends her relationship with Manav, and begins an affair with Abhijit. Meanwhile, Janet goes to work for designer Rahul Arora. Rahul's mother becomes increasingly concerned about his sexual orientation, so he asks Janet to marry him. Shonali's drug abuse worsens, and she attends a rehabilitation clinic. Meghna pays the price of her increasing fame by losing her close friends due to her changed attitude towards them. She becomes pregnant with Abhijit's child and reluctantly has an abortion due to conditions in her contract. After realizing that she was deceived in her relationship, Meghna tells Abhijit's wife about their relationship, and Abhijit ends Meghna's contract with Panache. Upset at the turn of events, Meghna descends into alcoholism; at a rave party she uses cocaine and unwittingly has a one-night stand. When sober, she feels guilty and returns to her parents in Chandigarh.

Broken and depressed, Meghna has lived in Chandigarh for over a year. Her father encourages her to return to Mumbai; Meghna rekindles her friendship with Janet and models for Rohit's show, where she freezes on the ramp after seeing the lights and cameras. She visits Manav (now an established model) to apologize and learns that he is engaged. Shonali appears on television as a mentally ill, homeless alcoholic; Meghna takes her in and tries to rehabilitate her. Meghna accepts an offer from Rahul to be the star model of his show, but a day before the show Shonali vanishes. Just before Meghna walks the ramp, she receives a call from the police telling her that Shonali is dead from a drug overdose. Meghna freezes; overcoming her grief, she walks the ramp, reviving her career and restoring her self-confidence. Meghna gives up drinking and smoking, and as the film closes, she walks the ramp in Paris.

== Cast ==
- Priyanka Chopra as Meghna Mathur, a small-town girl who becomes a successful model
- Kangana Ranaut as Shonali Gujral, a once-successful model who experiences a downfall
- Mugdha Godse as Janet Sequeira, a model; Meghna's best friend and ace designer
- Arbaaz Khan as Abhijith "Abhi" Sarin, a fashion tycon who is considered the "Big Daddy" of the fashion industry
- Arjan Bajwa as Manav Bhasin, a struggling turned established model
- Samir Soni as Rahul Arora, a fashion designer; Janet's best friend and later husband who is also the biggest supporter and well-wisher of Meghna
- Raj Babbar as Shobhit Mathur, Meghna's father
- Kiran Juneja as Hrishitaa Mathur, Meghna's mother
- Kitu Gidwani as Anisha Roy
- Suchitra Pillai as Avantika Sarin, Abhijith's wife
- Rohit Roy as Karthik Suri, a photographer
- Harsh Chhaya as Vinay Khosla
- Ashwin Mushran as Rohit Khanna, an aspiring designer who introduces Meghna to the fashion industry; Meghna's best friend and mentor
- Chitrashi Rawat as Shomu
- Manini Mishra as Sheena Bajaj
- Usha Bachani as Sheetal
- Sheena Bajaj as Meghna's cousin

=== Special appearances ===
- Madhur Bhandarkar as Himself
- Karan Johar as Himself
- Manish Malhotra as Himself
- Konkona Sen Sharma as Herself
- Ranvir Shorey as Himself
- Wendell Rodricks as Himself
- Diandra Soares as Herself
- Alesia Raut as Herself
- Kanishtha Dhankar as Herself
- Pooja Chopra as Herself
- Rakshanda Khan as Journalist
- Atul Kasbekar as Photographer

== Production ==
=== Development ===
In a 2006 interview with CNN-IBN, Madhur Bhandarkar said that he was preparing to make a film about the fashion industry; he thought the lack of Indian films on this subject prompted him to do so. He said he was fascinated with the industry, the models and their lives outside the ramp walks, saying "I was amazed at the overwhelming attention given to the fashion industry by the media and the public. I thought the idea of delving deep into the fashion world was very interesting and intriguing." He was excited about depicting the people behind the ramp because most people are unfamiliar with the fashion world.

Bhandarkar, who is known for studying his subject matter to make his films as realistic as possible, researched the fashion industry for nearly eight months, attending fashion events and shows. He spoke with designers, buyers, choreographers and models. Several media publications reported that the film was inspired by the lives of fashion models such as Shivani Kapur, Geetanjali Nagpal, Kate Moss and Alesia Raut; however, Bhandarkar stated that the story is fictional and does not resemble anyone's life. The media also reported that the film revolved around two homosexual fashion designers; Bhandarkar denied these rumours, saying the film did not revolve around male characters but had female protagonists.

=== Casting and characters ===
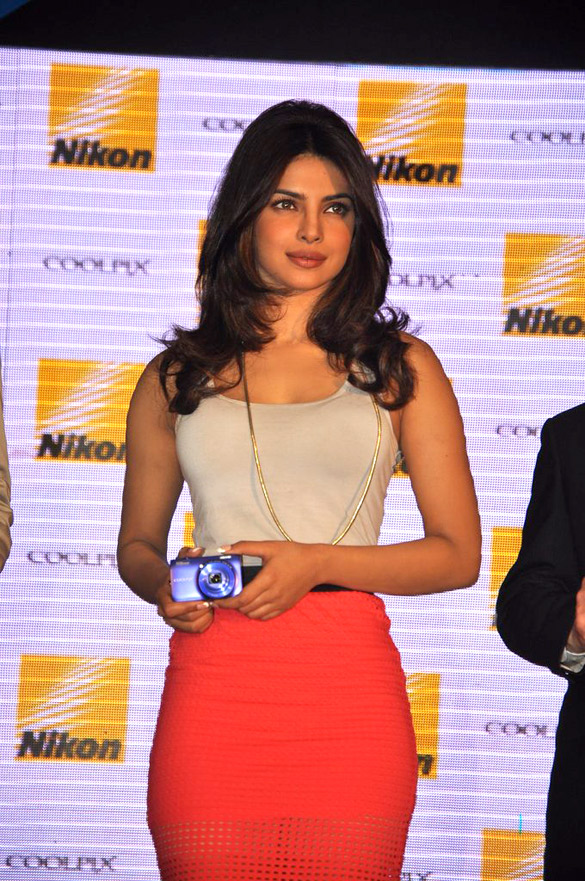
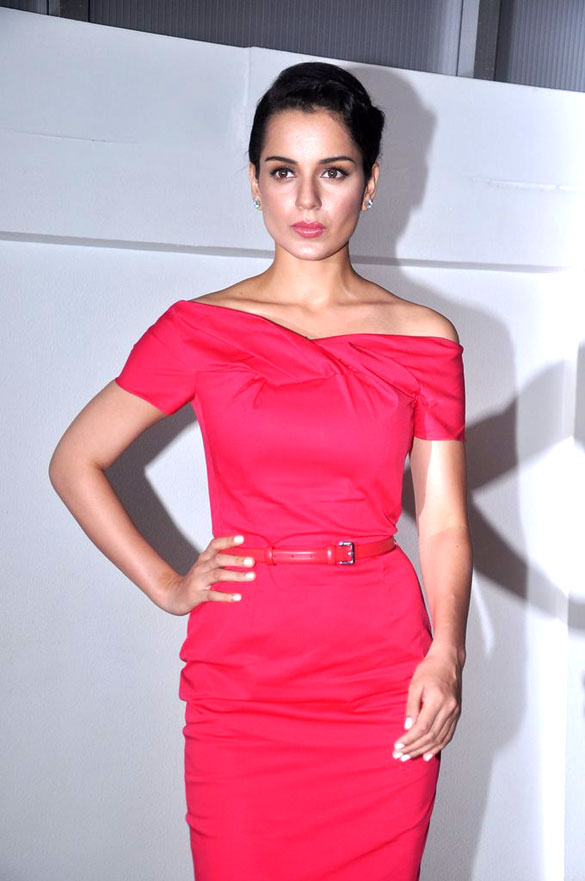
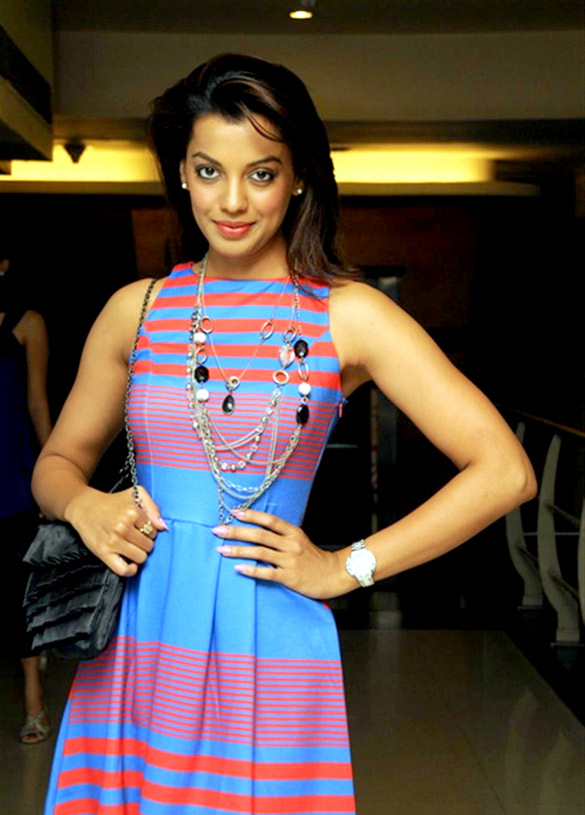
Chopra (top), Ranaut (middle) and Godse (bottom) were cast in the central roles to portray models in the film

Casting began in October 2007, when Priyanka Chopra signed to play the lead role in the film. Chopra initially refused the role, feeling she would not be able to do it justice. 6 months later, she agreed to appear in the film because of Bhandarkar's confidence in her. The media reported that Chopra was unhappy with the first draft of the film and wanted script changes before signing the film. Bhandarkar was also unhappy with the first draft and agreed to rewrite the script. Kangana Ranaut was cast as the film's second lead; she was pleased with the script and found it challenging, interesting and exciting. In December 2007, Arbaaz Khan and Arjan Bajwa were cast opposite Chopra. After confirming the principal cast, the media reported that Bhandarkar was having difficulty casting the male roles, including that of a homosexual clothing designer. Samir Soni and Harsh Chhaya were cast as the homosexual designers, and model Mugdha Godse was cast in a parallel lead role alongside Chopra and Ranaut. According to Godse, Bhandarkar offered her a part when they were shooting a jewellery advertisement; a year later, she agreed to appear in the film. The Hindustan Times said that several models and designers played themselves, giving the film the appearance of a documentary.

Chopra said she studied method acting to make her character seem real. The actress said that her character is determined and added, "While her father wants her to become an accountant she aspires to become the leading model in the fashion industry". Addressing rumors that the film was an exposé of the fashion industry, she said, "It is nothing like that. Whatever problems that come up to my character in the film are not because of the profession but because of the choices that my character makes in her life". Ranaut said, "In this script my character is such that you get to express your emotions, emotions that you have never delivered before in front of the camera. So when I heard the script, it was something new and much more challenging, more interesting and exciting." Godse said that she accepted her role in the film because she identified with her character, Janet Sequeira, whom she described as "outgoing, vibrant, bold and outspoken". Arjan Bajwa described his character, an aspiring fashion model, as uncompromising, achieving success in his way. Samir Soni found his role as a closeted fashion designer very challenging, requiring research to flesh out the character and his personality. Soni's greatest challenge was to avoid a stereotypical homosexual character, instead subtly expressing his sexuality in his personality and relationships with the film's other characters.

=== Styling ===
Rita Dhody and Narendra Kumar were chosen to style the film's characters. Dhody said it took nearly two months for UTV and Bhandarkar to persuade her to help design the film; she found the job challenging because she had to make everything as authentic as possible. Chopra had to wear 137 costumes in the film because her character passed through five phases. Initially, she was a "hep" character with brightly coloured, matching attire. Her make-up becomes lighter as she becomes a model and later a supermodel. When her career falters, Chopra's look becomes softer, demonstrating her character's lack of concern about her appearance before she returns to Mumbai. According to Dhody, Chopra's look is "very contemporary and very much today's look, but my idea was to streamline and take it to the classic side [rather] than making it trend-based".

Ranaut's character was designed to make audiences feel sympathy for her. Dhody gave her short dresses with low necklines, conveying the image of a supermodel comfortable with her body; during her low phase, she is shown in long T-shirts.

Godse, whose character is a failed model, has a carefree look. Dhody said, "Godse's look in the film is a fusion of rock and grunge to give her the survivor look as a B-grade model, making her more chic and glamorous." She wears low-waisted trousers, chains and ankle boots. Details of jewellery, clothes, colour and accessories outline the characters; everything had to be synchronized and complement each other to create an authentic look. Dhody said, "We didn't try to sensationalize it by making it more bling- or costume-based. I had to restrain myself from going overboard due to Bhandarkar's reservations". The film's narrative included 11 character-based ramp shows.

=== Filming ===
Principal photography commenced in December 2007, and the film was shot extensively in Mumbai. The scene with Ranaut's wardrobe malfunction during a ramp walk was filmed in late January 2008 at Mehboob Studios, Bandra. While filming the scene, only essential cast and crew members—including Bhandarkar and his cinematographer—were present; according to Bhandarkar, it was a sensitive scene and a sensitive issue. Chopra had to gain 6 kilograms (13 lb) as a girl from Chandigarh, and then lose it as a model; she had five "looks" in the film, connoting the phases through which her character passes. Although the media spread rumours that Chopra was starving herself to reduce her weight to that of a supermodel, she said that her appearance was achieved with two months of training and a disciplined diet. The film's climactic scene in which Chopra walks the ramp at Paris Fashion Week was supposed to be filmed in Paris, with the Eiffel Tower as a backdrop, but Bhandarkar could not shoot there. Instead, the scene uses some footage from the actual fashion show. In mid-August 2008, key scenes with Chopra, Raj Babbar and Kiran Juneja—Chopra's character's parents—were filmed in Chandigarh for authenticity; Bhandarkar said, "We wanted to bring the essence of the city alive in the scenes". The director said the film took about 106 days to complete, compared with his 45-day average.

== Themes and influences ==
Fashion is Bhandarkar's fourth women-centric film after Chandni Bar (2001), Page 3 (2005) and Corporate (2006) to earn widespread praise for their strong, independent female characters. According to The Times of India, Fashion "is not about cliches alone and manages to transcend them with its moving tale of three women who try to maintain their honor, dignity, [and] identity in a cruel world that spills over with grime behind the glamour. The film not only takes you behind the psychedelic ramp, it travels through the dark inner recesses of the three lead characters, laying bare their strengths and weaknesses; their fears and hopes; their dreams and nightmares". Ananya Bhattacharya of Zee News said that the film "went on to speak volumes about women, their aspirations and the dark side-effects of over-ambition". In an interview with the Hindustan Times, Chopra said that the film is "an emotional tale and the story of three girls ... [which] shows female bonding in a beautiful way ... ".

Reviewer Kriti Verma of Headlines India said that the movie "shows every bit about the life of models and bring the inside secrets of [the] fashion industry. It has everything—fashion weeks, casting couch, drugs, abuses, gay designers, bitching." Taran Adarsh from Bollywood Hungama wrote, "the narrative is inevitably filled with lots of glam-n-glitz moments. The fashion shows, the stunning models, the superb styling, the vibrant colors and the behind the scenes drama is worth every penny spent on the ticket." A reviewer from Sify.com found the film's depiction of the fashion industry "superficial"; noting that the film does not talk about the clothing, the creativity, or the passion for work in the fashion industry. However, according to Bhandarkar the film was "not about [the] fashion industry as such. It only has fashion as a backdrop. The film is more about the story of models, designers and people. And it is on aspects like the personal story, the individual story, their ups and downs, their journey that I tried to capture." Critics also said that the film explores drug abuse, homosexuality and gay relationships. Designer Vineet Bahl complained about the male characters, most of whom are portrayed as "gay designers and exploitative agency owners". He said, "Bhandarkar could have done without gross generalizations. It makes the movie shallow and over-dramatic".

The film alludes several times to actual incidents, including a scene where Bhandarkar appears at a fashion show to research his upcoming film on the fashion industry. One of the models looking at him says, "Oh that's Madhur Bhandarkar, the realistic filmmaker. Now he is going to expose the fashion world." It is taken from the Bhandarkar's experiences while researching the subjects of his films. The Indian Express said that Chopra's character, who indulges in drug and alcohol abuse and undergoes rehabilitation, resembles the life of British-educated model Shivani Kapur, who had similar experiences. The scene in which Ranaut's character's top slips off during a ramp walk resembles the experience of Carol Gracias at the 2006 Lakme Fashion Week.

== Soundtrack ==
The Fashion soundtrack album was composed by Salim–Sulaiman and the lyrics were written by Irfan Siddiqui. Sandeep Nath appeared as a guest lyricist for "Fashion Ka Jalwa". The soundtrack contains 4 original songs, 1 theme and 5 remixes. The music was released by Bhandarkar and the cast on 19 September 2008 at the Siddhivinayak Temple in Mumbai. The cast played the film's title song, offering their first CD to Lord Ganesha.

== Marketing and release ==
The film's trailer was unveiled on 17 July 2008 in Mumbai and was received warmly by critics and audiences. Emphasizing its theme, the lead female cast walked the ramp at fashion shows to promote the film. Fashion was also promoted at the Lakme Fashion Week, where Chopra, Ranaut and Godse walked the ramp. Made on a budget of ₹180 million (US$1.9 million), Fashion earned ₹85 million (US$880,000), and before release recouped half its cost from tie-ins with brands including Reebok, Lenovo, Sunsilk and LG Electronics. Products from these brands were showcased in the film and the brands promoted the film in their advertising.

Bhandarkar expressed disappointment about the Censor Board for Film Certification's decision to grant the film an "A" certificate—meant for viewers 18 years or older—instead of the "U/A" certificate that he had expected. His previous films received U/A certification despite adult content. According to them, their new guidelines did not allow Fashion a U/A certification. The board was willing to issue a U/A certificate after several cuts; Bhandarkar refused and accepted the A certificate since the scenes in question were crucial to the narrative. Before its release, the Delhi Commission for Women (DCW) asked Bhandarkar to screen the film before its release due to its concern that Ranaut's character was based on Geetanjali Nagpal—a former high-profile fashion model found begging, bedraggled and mentally unbalanced on the streets of Delhi in 2007. Nagpal was helped by the DCW, which did not want anyone profiting from her life. Bhandarkar narrated a summary of the film's plot at the DCW office, which satisfied the commission that there was no reference to Nagpal. A screening of the film was also held for the commission.

The film was originally scheduled for release on 14 November 2008, but that would've caused a box office with Chopra's Dostana and Fashion was released 29 October (Diwali) on 700 screens worldwide. The film was released in a two-disc, NTSC DVD package on 22 December 2008 in all regions. Distributed by Moser Baer Home Videos, one disc contains the film; the other disc has additional content on the making of the film and interviews with the stars and director. VCD and Blu-ray versions were released at the same time. The film's television premiere took place on UTV Movies on 15 March 2009.

UTV Indiagames also released a mobile video game based on the film.

== Reception ==
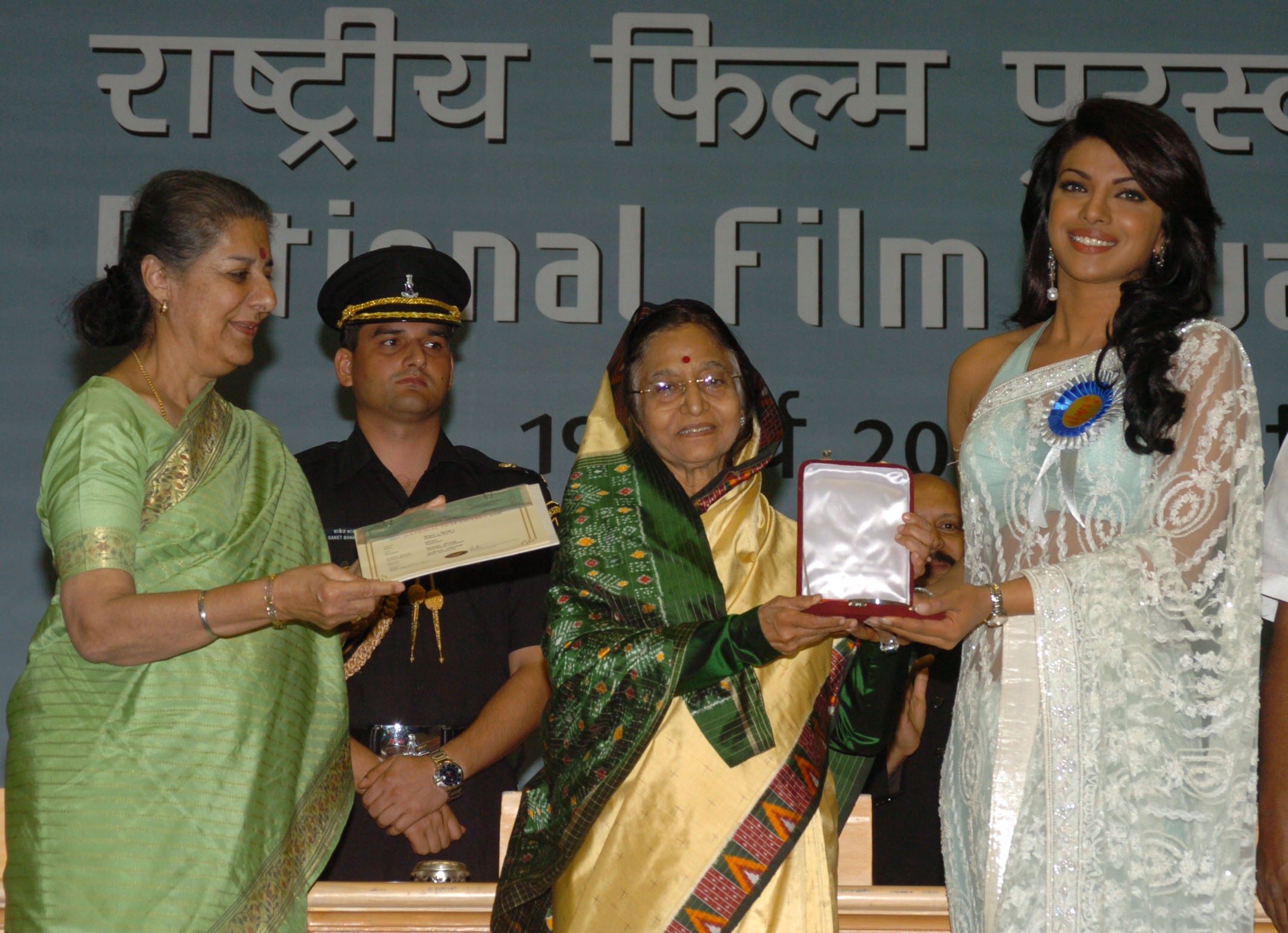
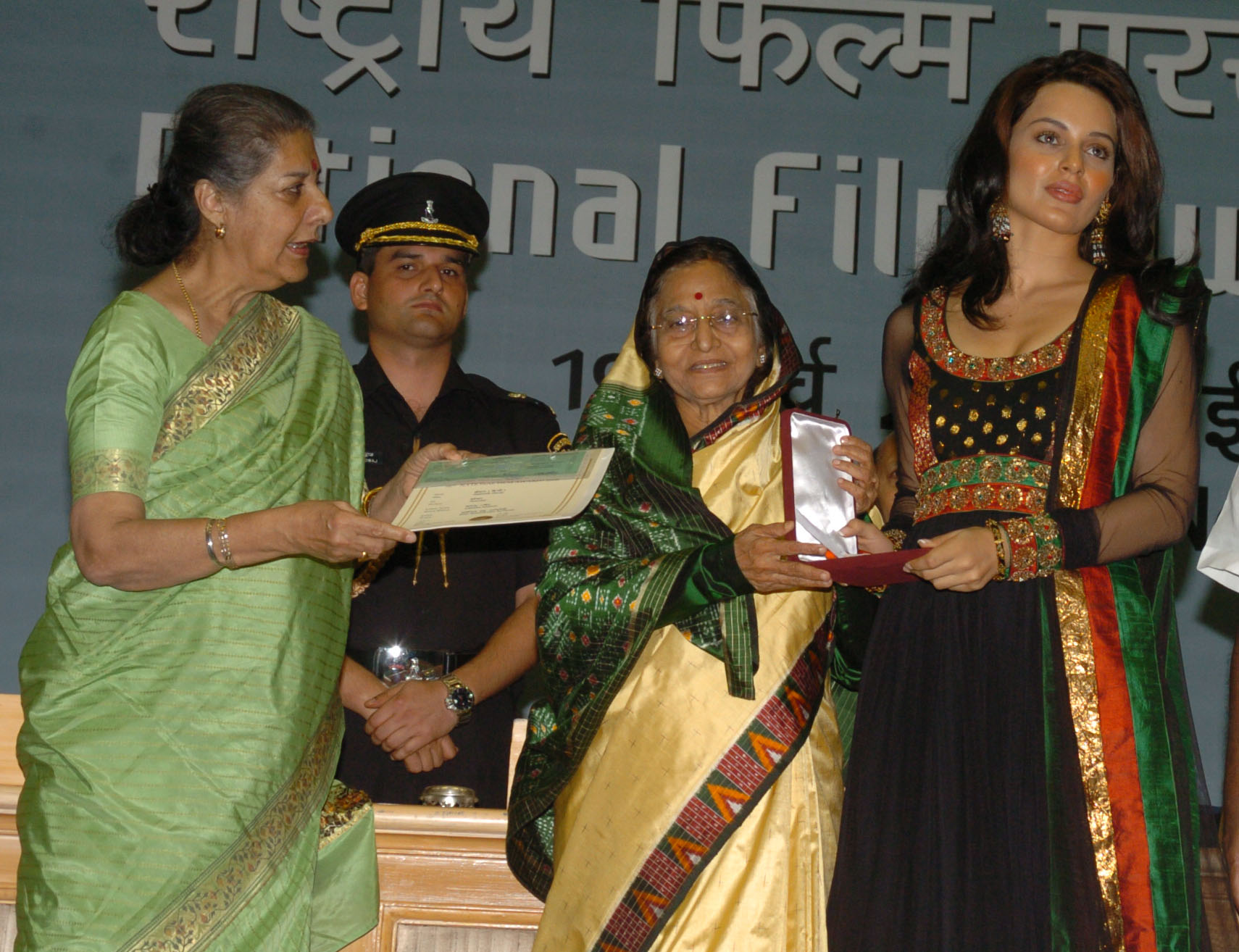
Priyanka Chopra and Kangana Ranaut's performance in Fashion garnered widespread critical acclaim winning them the National Film Award for Best Actress and Best Supporting Actress respectively at the 56th National Film Awards.

Fashion garnered highly positive reviews from critics, with praise for its direction, screenplay, cinematography, soundtrack and performances of the cast.

Kriti Verma of Headlines India rated the film 4 out of 5, describing it as "an outstanding film and a must watch for people who visit a theatre for something more than entertainment". Zee News gave the film a rating of 4 out of 5, called it "a must watch" and praised the sets, music, performances and storyline. Nikhat Kazmi rated the film 3.5 out of 5, describing it as " a sensitive parable on bonding and empowerment". Taran Adarsh rated the film 3.5 out of 5, praised the cinematography, screenplay, dialogue, costumes and styling, and called Fashion a "hard-hitting film that enlightens you, moves you, motivates and deflates you, even shocks and surprises you and of course, entertains you". Rajeev Masand gave the film a rating of 3 out of 5, and wrote, "Fashion is an easy watch because the very subject lends itself to so much interest. Like the director’s own film Page 3, it is mostly sensational and on several occasions compromises authenticity for the sake of exaggerated drama". He praised the performances of the lead cast, writing that "Chopra turns in a respectable performance, one that will inevitably go down as her best. The truth is, it’s one of those by-the-book characters that she understands only too well and performs just as easily. Ditto for Kangana Ranaut who plays the eccentric superdiva with such a practiced hand, it almost seems like an effortless delivery. It's ... Godse who invests such sincerity into her role, that she makes the character a real flesh and blood person. Kitu Gidwani, as the agency head who mentors our protagonist, Kitu strikes all the right notes, never once slipping out of character."

Subhash K. Jha of the Indo-Asian News Service rated the film 3 out of 5, calling it "a truly outstanding film". He said, "Bhandarkar takes us through a labyrinth of emotions, some devastating in their gut-level directness. But at the end, we come away with a film that gives us something to hold on to permanently even as the characters on screen lose practically everything worth holding on to". Jha also wrote that the sequences between Chopra and Ranaut as the highlights of the film. Gaurav Malani from The Economic Times rated the film a 3 out of 5, praised Chopra's performance and wrote, "Chopra's character graph [is] skillfully sketched from an aspiring model to an ambitious showstopper to a brash supermodel and subsequently to a faded manikin, desperate to make her comeback. In each phase her character exudes [a] contrasting gamut of emotions". Khalid Mohamed rated Fashion 3 out of 5, called the film a "must-try", and wrote, "Excelling on the catwalk as well as in the moments of self-destruction, Ranaut’s is the terrific, show-stopping performance". Sonia Chopra of Sify criticized the film's superficial portrayal of the fashion industry and called the film a superficial take on the lives of models and a dumbed-down version of the workings of the fashion industry. However, she praised the performances.

Fashion opened well at the box office, filling 90–100 per cent of seats in most Indian multiplexes. The film competed with the opening of a popular comedy, Golmaal Returns, but both films were box-office successes. Fashion earned approximately ₹40.4 million (US$420,000) on its opening day, the highest for a Madhur Bhandarkar film to date. The film went on to gross ₹600 million (US$6.2 million) at the box office. Fashion is noted for being a commercial success despite being a women-centric film without a male lead.

The National Film Archive of India (NFAI—part of the Ministry of Information and Broadcasting of the Government of India), which aims to safeguard the heritage of Indian cinema, preserved Fashion with others directed by Bhandarkar, including Chandni Bar (2001) and Page 3 (2005). In 2013, The Times of India included the film on its list of "Top 10 path breaking women oriented films of Bollywood". For International Women's Day 2013, Zee News included the film on its list of best women-centric films.

== Awards and nominations ==
Fashion received a number of awards and nominations in categories ranging from the film itself to its direction, screenplay, soundtrack and acting. At 56th National Film Awards, the film won 2 awards: Best Actress (Chopra) and Best Supporting Actress (Ranaut). The film received 7 nominations at the 54th Filmfare Awards, including Best Director (Bhandarkar) and Best Screenplay and won Best Actress (Chopra) and Best Supporting Actress (Ranaut). It was nominated for 6 awards at the 4th Apsara Film & Television Producers Guild Awards, winning 3: Best Actress (Chopra), Best Supporting Actress (Ranaut) and Best Female Debut (Godse).
