= Indian Idol (Hindi TV series) season 15 =

Indian reality TV show

Indian Idol
- Season 15
- Promotional poster featuring the judges, Badshah, Ghoshal and Dadlani.
- Hosted by: Aditya Narayan; Pawandeep Rajan (guest); Mohd. Danish (guest); Abhijeet Sawant (guest); Meiyang Chang (guest)
- Judges: Badshah; Shreya Ghoshal; Vishal Dadlani; Neeti Mohan (guest)
- No. of contestants: 16
- Winner: Manasi Ghosh
- Runner-up: Subhajit Chakraborty
- No. of episodes: 48

Release
- Original network: Sony Entertainment Television
- Original release: 26 October 2024 – 6 April 2025

Season chronology
- ← Previous; Season 14 Next → Season 16

The fifteenth season of Indian Idol premiered in late 2024, on Sony Entertainment Television. After being replaced for a year, Aditya Narayan returned as host, while Shreya Ghoshal and Vishal Dadlani returned as judges, along with Badshah replacing Kumar Sanu.

The grand finale aired on 5 and 6 April 2025, with Manasi Ghosh declared as the winner, Subhajit Chakraborty became the runner-up and Sneha Shankar being at the third place. The cheques of ₹25,00,000 and ₹5,00,000 to the winner and both runners-up respectively. Along with that, the winner received Suzuki Dzire from Maruti Suzuki and the coveted trophy.

The fourth places finishers, Priyangshu Dutta and Chaitanya Devadhe Mauli also received a cheque of ₹3,00,000 each.

== Auditions ==
Remote auditions took place from 18 August to 31 August 2024, as well as a number of open-call auditions, and from these, the producers selected the contestants who were then invited to audition in front of the judges.

Indian Idol (season 15) – regional auditions
City	Audition Date	Venue
Kolkata, West Bengal	18 August 2024	P.B. Academic School
Guwahati, Assam	20 August 2024	Nerim Group of Institutions
Noida, Uttar Pradesh	25 August 2024	JBM Global School
Mumbai, Maharashtra	31 August 2024	Pawar Public School

To mark 20 years of Indian Idol, the platinum mic was introduced that guarantees the contestant a position in Top 15. Each judge could give only 1 platinum mic. The platinum mics were given to Srijan Porail, Mayuri Saha and Sneha Shankar by Dadlani, Ghoshal and Badshah respectively. Golden tickets were continued, and were given 31 in total, but the golden mic was discontinued.

Also, during the judges' audition, the traditional "sticker" of contestant's serial number was replaced with a new "identity card" as shown in the promo. This season the judges were also given headphones to hear the raw voice of singers, without any instruments and processing.

== Theatre round ==
The Theatre round featured the top 31 golden ticket holder contestants performing for the judges. This round was filmed on X, at the Lata Mangeshkar Auditorium, and aired on 9 and 10 November 2024. The judges then narrowed the number of contestants down to 15, including the platinum mic holders.

This year the contestants performed in batches, as picked by the judges according to genre.

Neeti Mohan served as the guest judge and mentor in absence of Badshah, and Pawandeep Rajan and Mohd. Danish served as guest hosts in absence of Aditya Narayan.

The following is a list of the contestants and the song they performed. Contestants are listed in the order they performed.

Color key:

This contestant advanced to top 15.
This contestant was eliminated.

Day 1 (9 November)
Contestant	Batch No.	Song	Result
Shuja Gowhar	1	"Kurbaan Hua"	Elimimated
Lakshya Mehta	1	"Bekhayali"	Eliminated
Subhajit Chakraborty	2	"Surili Akhiyon Wale" & "Majhi Re"	Safe
Radha Shrivastava	2	"Main Aayi Hoon U.P. Bihar Lootne"	Eliminated
Chaitanya Devade	2	"Khel Mandala" & "Malhari"	Safe
Saloni Saaz	3	"Mere Maula Karam Ho Karam"	Eliminated
Ranjini Sen Gupta	4	"Achha Ji Main Haari Chalo"	Safe
Neha Dixit	4	"Bahon Mein Chale Aao"	Eliminated
Jyotiprakash Ojha	5	"Albela Sajan Aayo Re"	Safe
Ritika Raj	6	"Paan Khaye Saiyan Hamarao"	Safe
Prativa Dutta	6	"Agar Tum Sath Ho"	Eliminated
Ipsit Pati	7	"Janam Janam"	Safe
Vastav Kumar	8	"Oopar Khuda Aasman Neeche"	Safe
Mansi Sisodiya	8	"Sajdaa"	Eliminated

Day 2 (10 November)
Contestant	Batch No.	Song	Result
Biswarup Banerjee	1	"Satrangi Re"	Safe
Priyangshu Dutta	1	"Tadap Tadap"	Safe
Ayushman Chaudhary	2	"Satranga"	Elimimated
Sudhanshu Khare	2	"Sajni Re"	Eliminated
Myscmme Bosu	3	"Silsila Ye Chahat Diya"	Safe
Manasi Ghosh	3	"Aa Zara"	Safe
Dilraj Singh	4	"Main Nikla Gaddi Leke"	Elimimated
Haarshita Medhi	5	"Daiya Yeh Main Kaha Phasi"	Elimimated
Ragini Shinde	5	"Bada Dukh Dina O Ramji"	Safe
Poushali Bhattacharya	6	"Jawani Janeman"	Elimimated
Inayat Bajaj Kaur	6	"Girls Like To Swing"	Eliminated
Anirudh Suswaram	7	"Soona Soona"	Safe
Vishnumaya Ramesh	8	"Kehna Hi Kya"	Eliminated
Kritwika Chakraborty	8	"Pyar Hua Chupke Se"	Eliminated
Tajinder Singh	9	"Vida Karo"	Eliminated
Manav Heera	Not Telecasted		Eliminated
Abid Khan Langa	Not Telecasted		Elimimated

== Top 16 contestants ==
The contestant who made past the theater round or got the platinum mic in the auditions, are listed below as follows:

Contestant	Status
Manasi Ghosh	Winner on 6 April 2025
Subhajit Chakraborty	Runner-up on 6 April 2025
Sneha Shankar	Third place on 6 April 2025
Chaitanya Devadhe (Mauli)	Fourth places on 6 April 2025
Priyangshu Dutta	Fourth places on 6 April 2025
Anirudh Suswaram	Sixth place on 5 April 2025
Myscmme Bosu	Eliminated on 22 March 2025
Ragini Shinde	Eliminated on 22 March 2025
Biswarup Banerjee	Eliminated on 9 March 2025
Ritika Raj	Eliminated on 9 March 2025
Mayuri Saha	Eliminated on 23 February 2025
Ranjini Sen Gupta	Eliminated on 26 January 2025
Srijan Porail	Eliminated on 12 January 2025
Jyotiprakash Ojha	Eliminated on 29 December 2024
Vastav Kumar	Eliminated on 15 December 2024
Ipsit Pati	Eliminated on 1 December 2024

== Gala rounds ==
After the theater round, every week all the contestants performing in the gala and are eliminated on a weekly basis.

The gala rounds were filmed at the P3 Infotech Film Studio.

Colour Key:

This contestant was saved by the judges' scores.
This contestant was in the bottom two or three as per judges scores.
This contestant was eliminated.
This contestant won Indian Idol.
This contestant was the runner-up.
This contestant finished in third place.
This contestant finished in fourth place.
This contestant finished in sixth place.

=== Gala 1 : Top 16 – The Grand Musical Explosion ===
Special guests: Usha Mangeshkar, Sanjeev Kapoor, Manoj Tiwari, Asees Kaur, Goldie Sohel, Bhagyashree, Arjun Kanungo, Divyansh Kacholia, Sanjay B Jumani, Kunal Ganjawala

Ragini Shinde, who was eliminated in the theatre round, when Badhshah was absent, joined as wild card contestant in Gala 1, on request of Badshah, to make it Top 16.

There was no public voting this week and the performance did not count in the competition. Contestants are listed in the order they performed.

Top 16 (16–17 November)
Contestant	Song
Mayuri Saha	"Ami Je Tomar 3.0"
Srijan Porail	"O Meri Jaan"
Ritika Raj	"Cham Cham Nachdi Phiran"
Vastav Kumar	"Afreen Afreen"
Ranjini Sen Gupta	"O Meri Maina, Tu Maan Le Mera Kehna"
Myscmme Bosu	"Yeh Kahan Aa Gaye Hum"
Anirudh Suswaram	"Srivalli" and "Dil Se"
Ipsit Pati	"Bachna Ae Haseeno"
Manasi Ghosh	"Gun Gun Guna"
Priyangshu Dutta	"Kalank - Title Track"
Chaitanya Devadhe	"Ramta Jogi" and "Jhingat"
Sneha Shankar	"Yaad Piya Ki Aaye"
Ragini Shinde	"Tumko Piya Dil Diya" and "Main Chali Main Chali"
Subhajit Chakraborty	"Maya Lagaise" and "Jag Ghoomeya"
Biswarup Banerjee	"Saathiya"
Jyotiprakash Ojha	"Laga Chunari Me Daag"

=== Gala 2 : Top 16 – Two Themes special ===
This week was divided into two themes, dedicated to directors Subhash Ghai and Mahesh Bhatt who were the special guests and guest mentor for respective nights. The contestants performed on the songs which were in the films directed by them, in the two nights respectively, and this week was the first public voting week of the season.

Shreya Ghoshal was absent this week, due to her live show tour.

Top 16 (23–24 November)
Contestant	Performed on	Song
Manasi Ghosh	Night 1 – An Evening with Subhash Ghai	"Yeh Dil Deewana"
Jyotiprakash Ojha	Night 1 – An Evening with Subhash Ghai	"One Two Ka Four"
Myscmme Bosu	Night 1 – An Evening with Subhash Ghai	"Kahin Aag Lage" and "Taal Se Taal"
Ragini Shinde	Night 1 – An Evening with Subhash Ghai	"Koi Rok Sake To Rok Le"
Ranjini Sen Gupta	Night 1 – An Evening with Subhash Ghai	"Kitni Baatein"
Ritika Raj	Night 1 – An Evening with Subhash Ghai	"Lambi Judai"
Vastav Kumar	Night 1 – An Evening with Subhash Ghai	"Wo Kisna Hai"
Ipsit Pati	Night 1 – An Evening with Subhash Ghai	"Ek Haseena Thi"
Subhajit Chakraborty	Night 2 – A Night of Nostalgia with Mahesh Bhatt	"Saanson Ki Jarurat Hai Jaise" and "Je Jon Premer Vab Jane Na"
Priyangshu Dutta	Night 2 – A Night of Nostalgia with Mahesh Bhatt	"Khamoshiyan"
Biswarup Banerjee	Night 2 – A Night of Nostalgia with Mahesh Bhatt	"Bepanah" and "Chale Aaye"
Chaitanya Devadhe	Night 2 – A Night of Nostalgia with Mahesh Bhatt	"Mann Ki Lagan"
Mayuri Saha	Night 2 – A Night of Nostalgia with Mahesh Bhatt	"Gali Mein Aaj Chaand Nikala" and "Ghunghat Ki Aad Se Dilbar Ka"
Srijan Porail	Night 2 – A Night of Nostalgia with Mahesh Bhatt	"Dil Ibaadat"
Sneha Shankar	Night 2 – A Night of Nostalgia with Mahesh Bhatt	"Tum Itna Jo Muskura Rahe Ho"
Anirudh Suswaram	Night 2 – A Night of Nostalgia with Mahesh Bhatt	"Tum Mile" and "Roop Suhana Lagta Hai"

=== Gala 3 : Top 16 – Two Themes special ===
This week was the first judges' score week and the first elimination took place on basis of last week's votes and this week's scores.

The special guests for first night were Fardeen Khan, his sister Laila Khan Furniturewala and Zeenat Aman celebrating Feroz Khan, and Nana Patekar for the second night. All the contestants performed on the songs of Feroz Khan on the first night. Vishal Dadlani was absent for this week.

The director of the movie Vanvaas, Anil Sharma, and lead cast, Utkarsh Sharma and Simrat Kaur joined for a while to promote the said film.

Contestants are listed in the order they performed.

Top 16 (30 November–1 December)
Contestant	Performed on	Song	Result (Gala 2+3)
Subhajit Chakraborty	Night 1 – Fearless Feroz	"Tere Chehre Men Woh Jadoo Hai"	Safe
Chaitanya Devadhe	Night 1 – Fearless Feroz	"Kambakkht Ishq"	Safe
Manasi Ghosh	Night 1 – Fearless Feroz	"Dum Maro Dum"	Safe
Mayuri Saha	Night 1 – Fearless Feroz	"Do Lafzon Ki Hai"	Safe
Ranjini Sen Gupta	Night 1 – Fearless Feroz	"Aap Jaisa Koi" and "Laila O Laila"	Safe
Ragini Shinde	Night 1 – Fearless Feroz	"Chura Liya Hai Tumne Jo Dil Ko"	Safe
Jyotiprakash Ojha	Night 1 – Fearless Feroz	"Hum Tumhen Chahte Hain" and "Aakhir Tumhe Aana Hai"	Bottom three
Biswarup Banerjee	Night 1 – Fearless Feroz	"Do Pyar Karne Wale" and "Jo Tumko Ho Pasand Wohi Baat Karenge"	Safe
Priyangshu Dutta	Night 2 – Bebak Nana	"Naina"	Safe
Ritika Raj Singh	Night 2 – Bebak Nana	"Bindiya Chamkegi" and "Leke Pehla Pehla Pyar"	Safe
Srijan Porail	Night 2 – Bebak Nana	"Roop Tera Mastana"	Safe
Myscmme Bosu	Night 2 – Bebak Nana	"Yeh Dil Sun Raha Hai"	Safe
Vastav Kumar	Night 2 – Bebak Nana	"Aahun Aahun"	Safe
Sneha Shankar	Night 2 – Bebak Nana	"Yeh Dil Tum Bin"	Safe
Ipsit Pati	Night 2 – Bebak Nana	"Kesariya"	Eliminated
Anirudh Suswaram	Night 2 – Bebak Nana	"Bahon Ke Darmiyan"	Bottom three

=== Gala 4: Top 15 – Two Themes special ===
To celebrate a year of the movie Animal, its director Sandeep Reddy Vanga joined as a special guest on the first night. And the second night was dedicated to celebrate Vishal Mishra's birthday. He himself joined the night and served as guest mentor. Also, for Vastav's performance, Bhupinder Babbal joined the sets. This week was the second public voting week of the season.

Contestants are listed in the order they performed. Sneha was performer of the week.

Top 15 (7-8 December)
Contestant	Performed on	Song
Ritika Raj Singh	Night 1 – Celebrating 1 Year Of Animal	"Tujhe Kitna Chahne Lage"
Ragini Shinde	Night 1 – Celebrating 1 Year Of Animal	"Aaja Aai Bahar"
Myscmme Bosu	Night 1 – Celebrating 1 Year Of Animal	"Satranga"
Subhajit Chakraborty	Night 1 – Celebrating 1 Year Of Animal	"O Mere Dil Ke Chain"
Anirudh Suswaram	Night 1 – Celebrating 1 Year Of Animal	"Hua Main"
Vastav Kumar	Night 1 – Celebrating 1 Year Of Animal	"Arjan Vailly"
Biswarup Banerjee	Night 1 – Celebrating 1 Year Of Animal	"Deewana Tera"
Mayuri Saha	Night 1 – Celebrating 1 Year Of Animal	"Hawa Hawaii"
Chaitanya Devadhe	Night 2- Happy Birthday Vishal	"Aj mera Jee Karda"
Manasi Ghosh	Night 2- Happy Birthday Vishal	"Tu pehla pehla pyaar hai mera"
Ranjini Sen Gupta	Night 2- Happy Birthday Vishal	"Jhoomroo"
Jyotiprakash Ojha	Night 2- Happy Birthday Vishal	"Mitwaa"
Priyangshu Dutta	Night 2- Happy Birthday Vishal	"Kaise Hua"
Srijan Porail	Night 2- Happy Birthday Vishal	"Pehle Bhi Main"
Sneha Shankar	Night 2- Happy Birthday Vishal	"Chal Tere Ishq Mein"

=== Gala 5: Top 15 – Celebrating 100 Years of Raj Kapoor ===
Both nights of this week were dedicated to celebrate Raj Kapoor's 100th birth anniversary. Karisma Kapoor, Padmini Kolhapure and Anees Bazmee joined as special guests for the week.

Contestants are listed in the order in which they performed.

Top 15 (14-15 December)
Contestant	Performed on	Song	Result (Gala 4+5)
Manasi Ghosh	Night 1	"Mud Mud Ke Na Dekh"	Safe
Ranjini Sen Gupta	Night 1	"Kisi Ki Muskurahaton Pe"	Safe
Myscmme Bosu	Night 1	"Ek Radha Ek Meera"	Safe
Biswarup Banerjee	Night 1	"Dost Dost Na Raha Pyaar Pyaar Na Raha"	Safe
Subhajit Chakraborty	Night 1	"Jane Kaha Gaye woh Din"	Safe
Chaitanya Devadhe	Night 1	"Mera Joota Hai Japani"	Safe
Mayuri Saha	Night 1	"Sun Saiba Sun"	Safe
Vastav Kumar	Night 1	"Ek Din bik jaayega"	Eliminated
Ritika Raj Singh	Night 2	Yeh Galliyan Yeh Chaubara	Bottom three
Ragini Shinde	Night 2	"Panchhi Banoon Udti Phiroon"	Safe
Priyangshu Dutta	Night 2	"Hum Shaayar To Nahin"	Safe
Sneha Shankar	Night 2	Chittiye Ni	Safe
Srijan Porail	Night 2	"Ae Bhai Zara Dekh Ke Chalo"	Safe
Anirudh Suswaram	Night 2	"Chalat Musafir"	Safe
Jyotiprakash Ojha	Night 2	"Dum Dum Diga Diga"	Bottom three

Non-competition performance (14-15 December)
Performers	Song
Myscmme and Shubhajit	"Ye Raat Bheegi Bheegi"
Mayuri and Priyangshu	"Pyaar Hua Hai Ikraar Hua Hai"

=== Gala 6: Top 14 – Christmas concert ===
Both nights of the week they celebrated Christmas. Paradox, Rishabh Rikhiram Sharma, Papon, Priyank Sharma, Nikhita Gandhi, Meiyang Chang were the guests. For the promotion of CID Season 2 Shivaji Satam, Aditya Shrivastava and Dayanand Shetty came to support Ragini Shinde Indian Idol Contestant and came for the promotion of the same.

Manasi sings "Akh Ladh Jave" with Badshah and Paradox.

=== Gala 7: Top 14 – 90s celebration ===
This was the elimination week, where judges had to give scores to the duet performing collectively. The lowest scoring duet will be in the bottom and one of them will be elimination on the basis of last week public votes.

Sangeeta Bijlani and Ayesha Jhulka joined for each night respectively while Badshah was again absent.

Contestant	Performed on	Song	Result (Gala 6+7)
Srijan Porail	Night 1	"Chura Ke Dil Mera"	Safe
Ragini Shinde	Night 1	"Chura Ke Dil Mera"	Safe
Mayuri Saha	Night 1	"Aisi Deewangi"	Safe
Chaitanya Devadhe	Night 1	"Aisi Deewangi"	Safe
Manasi Ghosh	Night 1	"Kuch Kuch Hota Hai"	Safe
Subhajit Chakraborty	Night 1	"Kuch Kuch Hota Hai"	Safe
Jyotiprakash Ojha	Night 1	"Gali Gali Mein"	Safe
Ranjini Sen Gupta	Night 1	"Gali Gali Mein"	Safe
Chaitanya Devadhe	Night 1	"Pardesi Pardesi"	Safe
Sneha Shankar	Night 1	"Pardesi Pardesi"	Safe
Myscmme Bosu	Night 1	"Aankhon Ki Gustakhiyan"	Safe
Biswarup Banerjee	Night 1	"Aankhon Ki Gustakhiyan"	Safe
Priyangshu Dutta	Night 1	"Dil Hai Ke Manta Nahi"	Safe
Sneha Shankar	Night 1	"Dil Hai Ke Manta Nahi"	Safe
Ritika Raj Singh	Night 2	"Hata Sawan Ki Ghata"	Bottom two
Jyotiprakash Ojha	Night 2	"Hata Sawan Ki Ghata"	Eliminated
Mayuri Saha	Night 2	"Meri Mehbooba"	Safe
Biswarup Banerjee	Night 2	"Meri Mehbooba"	Safe
Ritika Raj Singh	Night 2	"Dhak Dhak Karne Laga"	Safe
Anirudh Suswaram	Night 2	"Dhak Dhak Karne Laga"	Safe
Myscmme Bosu	Night 2	"Pehla Nasha"	Safe
Priyangshu Dutta	Night 2	"Pehla Nasha"	Safe
Srijan Porail	Night 2	"Kay Sera Sera"	Safe
Manasi Ghosh	Night 2	"Kay Sera Sera"	Safe
Ragini Shinde	Night 2	"Tujhe Dekha To"	Safe
Subhajit Chakraborty	Night 2	"Tujhe Dekha To"	Safe
Ranjini Sen Gupta	Night 2	"Tu Hi Re"	Safe
Anirudh Suswaram	Night 2	"Tu Hi Re"	Safe

Non-competition performance (28-29 December)
Performers	Song
Vishal and Sneha	"Yeh Ladka Hai Deewana"
Chaitanya Devadhe	"Aas Paas Khuda"

=== Gala 8: Top 13- Celebrating greatest love songs ===
During this week, Indian Idol celebrated the songs often referenced as "greatest love songs" with singer Abhijeet Bhattacharya and his wife Sumati Bhattacharya, music composer Lalit Pandit of the duo Jatin-Lalit, singer Sadhana Sargam and actress Preeti Jhangiani.

=== Gala 9: Top 13- Two Themes special ===
This was the fourth elimination week of the season. For night 1, the crew and cast of upcoming film Azaad, namely, Rasha Thadani, Amaan Devgan, Abhishek Kapoor and Amit Trivedi joined for the promotions. And in night 2, the cast of upcoming film Emergency, Kangana Ranaut and Anupam Kher joined for the promotion.

Contestant	Performed on	Song	Result (Gala 8+9)
Srijan Porail	Night 1 – 2025 Ka Superhit Start	"Rock On" & "London Thumakda"	Eliminated
Myscmme Bosu	Night 1 – 2025 Ka Superhit Start	"Hungama Ho Gaya"	Safe
Chaitanya Devadhe	Night 1 – 2025 Ka Superhit Start	"Namo Namo"	Safe
Ranjini Sen Gupta	Night 1 – 2025 Ka Superhit Start	"Jo Tum Na Ho" & "Sinbad the Sailor"	Safe
Priyangshu Dutta	Night 1 – 2025 Ka Superhit Start	"Ye Fitoor Mera"	Safe
Ritika Raj Singh	Night 1 – 2025 Ka Superhit Start	"Pareshaan"	Bottom three
Biswarup Banerjee	Night 2 – Sensational 70s	"Jaane Jaan Dhoondhta phir raha"	Safe
Anirudh Suswaram	Night 2 – Sensational 70s	"Gulabi Aankhen" & "Badan Pe Sitare"	Safe
Manasi Ghosh	Night 2 – Sensational 70s	"Yeh Mera Dil Yaar Ka Deewana"	Safe
Ragini Shinde	Night 2 – Sensational 70s	"Ja Re Ja O Harjai"	Safe
Subhajit Chakraborty	Night 2 – Sensational 70s	"Khaike Paan Banaras Wala"	Bottom three
Sneha Shankar	Night 2 – Sensational 70s	"Ankhiyon Ko Rehne De"	Safe
Mayuri Saha	Night 2 – Sensational 70s	"Naam Gum Jayega"	Safe

Non-competition performance (11-12 January)
Performers	Song
Vishal Dadlani	"Bang Bang"
Shreya Ghoshal	"Chaka Chak"
Badshah	"Let's Nacho"
Badshah	"Ladki Ladki Shehar Ki Ladki"
Ritika Raj Singh	"Jhalla Wallah"
Srijan and Manasi	"Gulaabo"
Biswarup & Shreya	"Soniyo"

=== Gala 10: Top 12 – Bhai Behan special ===
In this Episode Aparajita Singh (Badshah's Sister) will join the sets for Bhai-Behen Special.

=== Gala 11: Top 12 – Two Themes special ===
In this Episode Vikas Khanna and Ranveer Brar joined the sets with Rajiv Adatia, Archana Gautam, Tejasswi Prakash, Faisal Shaikh, Gaurav Khanna and Abhijeet Sawant contestants of Celebrity Masterchef India

In next Episode Akshay Kumar and Veer Pahariya joined the sets for the promotion of their film Sky Force.

=== Gala 12: Top 11 – Celebrating Evergreen songs ===
In Part 1 contestants sang evergreen songs and Junaid Khan and Khushi Kapoor joined the sets for the promotion of their movie Loveyapa

In Part 2 Megastar Jeetendra joined the sets to celebrate evergreen songs.

=== Gala 13: Top 11 – Rajshri Ka Utsav ===
In this Episode Sooraj Barjatya joined the sets with Rithik Ghanshani and Ayesha Kaduskar for the promotion of their new movie on OTT platform Bada Naam Karenge along with Karishma Kapoor and Mohnish Bahl to celebrate 25 years of Hum Saath Saath Hain.

In the 2nd Part Bada Naam Karenge director Palash Vaswani and music Composer Anurag Saikia also joined the sets. The participants sang song of various movies produced by Rajshri Production.

=== Gala 14: Top 11 – Neelam-Govinda special ===
In this episode Neelam Kothari and Govinda Ahuja joined the sets and the participants sang songs from the films where both the actor and actress had acted.

=== Gala 17: Top 10 - Holi with Hema Malini ===
The first double elimination of the season happened this week. Hema Malini joined as the guest for both nights. In the second night, the lead crew of The Waking of a Nation joined for its promotion. This week also marked the return of Vishal Dadlani, who was absent for a few weeks due to his motor accident.

- Guest dance performance- Raagini Makkhar & Naadyog Academy
- Guest song performance- Taaruk Raina on "Chala Chali Ka Khela"

Top 10 (8–9 March)
Contestant	Performed on	Song	Result (Gala 16+17)
Subhajit Chakraborty	Night 1	"Rang Barse Bhige Chunar Wali"	Safe
Ragini Shinde	Night 1	"Tune O Rangeele"	Safe
Myscmme Bosu	Night 1	"Jai Jai Shiv Shankar" & "Jai Jai Shivshankar" from War	Safe
Sneha Shankar	Night 1	"Hume Tumse Pyaar Kitna"	Safe
Chaitanya Devadhe	Night 1	"Deva Shree Ganesha"	Safe
Ritika Raj Singh	Night 2	"Mere Naseeb Mein"	Eliminated
Manasi Ghosh	Night 2	"Balam Pichkari" & "Mohe Panghat Pe"	Safe
Priyangshu Dutta	Night 2	"Dream Girl"	Safe
Biswarup Banerjee	Night 2	"Pal Bhar Ke Liye"	Eliminated
Anirudh Suswaram	Night 2	"Holi Khele Raghuveera"	Bottom three

Non-competition performances
Performers	Song
Myscmme & Priyangshu	"Kya Khoob Lagti Ho"
All contestants, hosts and judges	"Holiya Mein Ude Gulal"
Ragini & Chaitanya	"O Saathi Chal"
Manasi & Shubhajit	"Gallan Goodiyaan"

=== Gala 18: Top 8 – Shreya Ghoshal's birthday night ===
This episode was dedicated to the judge Shreya Ghoshal to celebrate her birthday. Her father and mother joined to celebrate along. Voting for all the contestants were opened that night.

Top 8 (15 March)
Contestant	Song
Subhajit Chakraborty	
Ragini Shinde	Pinga
Myscmme Bosu	Chaka Chak
Sneha Shankar	
Chaitanya Devadhe	
Manasi Ghosh	Ye Ishq Hai
Priyangshu Dutta	Tum Kya Mile
Anirudh Suswaram	

=== Gala 19 : Top 8 – Sunny Deol special ===
Sunny Deol joined as the special for the night to promote his film Jaat. This episode was shot the same as Shreya's birthday episode but was telecasted in two different parts and themes where all contestants performed on each night. Voting lines for all the contestants were again open that night.

Top 8 (16 March)
Contestant	Song
Subhajit Chakraborty	Aaj Mausam Bada Beimaan Hai Bada
Ragini Shinde	Jab Hum Jawan Honge
Myscmme Bosu	Mai Tere Ishq Mein
Sneha Shankar	Jaane Kya Baat Hain
Chaitanya Devadhe	Udd Ja Kaale Kawan, Main Jatt Yamla Pagla Deewana
Manasi Ghosh	Na Jane Kahan Se Aayi Hain
Priyangshu Dutta	Na Jaa Kahi Ab Na Jaa
Anirudh Suswram	Jhoom Barabar Jhoom

=== Gala 20: Top 8 – Semi-Finals with Karan Johar ===
This was the judges scoring night with the season's second double elimination on the basis of public votes of both nights from the last week and the judges scores of this night. All the contestants performed the songs from the movies of Karan Johar.

Contestant	Song	Result (Gala 18+19+20)
Sneha Shankar	"Tujhe Yaad Na Meri Aayi"	Safe
Manasi Ghosh	"Dilliwaali Girlfriend" & " The Breakup Song"	Safe
Subhajit Chakraborty	"Abhi Mujh Mein Kahin"	Safe
Chaitanya Devadhe	"Pehli Baar"	Safe
Priyangshu Dutta	"Channa Mereya"	Safe
Myscmme Bosu	"Ghagra"	Eliminated
Anirudh Suswram	"Kal Ho Naa Ho"	Bottom three
Ragini Shinde	"Kabhi Alvida Naa Kehna"	Eliminated

=== Gala 21: Top 6 – Semi-Finals with Karan Johar ===
This was the final voting night of the season to decide the season's winner next week. The top 6 again sang the songs from the movies of Karan Johar.

Top 6 (23 March)
Contestant	Song
Priyangshu Dutta	"Kesariya"
Subhajit Chakraborty	"Mitwa"
Manashi Ghosh	"Desi Girl"
Chaitanya Devadhe	"Deva Deva"
Sneha Shankar	"Sajdaa"
Anirudh Suswaram	"Badtameez Dil" & "Locha-E-Ulfat"

=== Gala 22: Top 6 – Pre-Finale 1 ===
The "supposed to be" finale was moved to a week later and Neelam Kothari was the guest of this episode. The songs sung in this episode were:

Contestant	Song
Anirudh Suswaram	"Koi Kahe Kehta Rahe"
Chaitanya Devadhe	"Tashan mein"
Manashi Ghosh	"Aa zara kareeb se"
Subhajit Chakraborty	"Chand Sifarish" and "Mere Sai"
Priyangshu Dutta	"O Bedardeya"
Sneha Shankar	"Bhare Naina"

=== Gala 23: Top 6 – Pre-Finale 2 ===
Contestant	Song
Chaitanya Devadhe	"Sultan"
Subhajit Chakraborty	"Surili Ankhiyon Wale" & "Tere Mast Mast Do Nain"
Manashi Ghosh	"Beedi", "Dard-e-Disco" & "Om Shanti Om"
Sneha Shankar	"Maahi Ve"
Priyangshu Dutta	"Janam Janam"
Anirudh Suswaram	"Bin Tere"

=== Gala 24: Top 6 – Grand Finale (The Grandest 90s night) ===
- Special Guests: Raveena Tandon, Shilpa Shetty, Mika Singh

==== Playfront Challenge (Night 1) ====
Out of the top 6 finalist, judges had to pick top 5 based on their performance, by placing the platinum mic on their name's podium.

Contestant	Song	Result
Manashi Ghosh	"Dil Se"	Safe
Subhajit Chakraborty	"Sochenge Tumhe Pyaar"	Safe
Anirudh Suswaram	"Haye Rama"	Sixth place
Sneha Shankar	"Meri Zindagi Tera Pyaar"	Safe
Chaitanya Devadhe	"Tere Bin Nahi Jeena"	Safe
Priyangshu Dutta	"Mera Dil Bhi Kitna Pagal Hai"	Safe

==== Performance 2 (Night 1) ====
The top 5 finalists performed for the judges' scores to secure a place in top 3 in combination with the public votes from semi-final 2.

Contestant	Performed on	Song	Result
Subhajit Chakraborty	Night 1	"Chalo Ishq Ladayen Sanam" & "Mai Khiladi Tu Anadi"	Safe
Sneha Shankar	Night 1	"Dilbar Dilbar", "Der Na Ho Jaye Kahin" & "Aaja Ve Mahi Tera Rasta"	Safe
Chaitanya Devadhe	Night 2	"Gunghte Mein Chanda", "Khalnayak"	Fourth places
Priyangshu Dutta	Night 2	"O Jaane Jaana", "Chura Ke Dil Mera"	Fourth places
Manashi Ghosh	Night 2	"Chunari Chunari", "Ye Kali Kali Aankhen"	Safe

==== Performance 3 (Night 2) ====
The top 3 finalists performed for the last time and based on the votes from the semi-final 2, the results were announced.

Contestant	Song	Result
Subhajit Chakraborty	"Chaand Taare"	Runner-up
Sneha Shankar	"Mera Piya Ghar Aaya"	Third place
Manashi Ghosh	"Hui Mai Mast"	Winner

Non-competition performances
Performers	Song
Mika Singh	"Sawan Mein Lag Gayi Aag"
Vishal Dadlani	"Kudi Nu Nachne De", "Jee Le Zaraa"
Shreya Ghoshal	"Drama Queen", Suseki"
Badshah	"Morni", "Kala Chashma"
Ram Shankar & Sneha Shankar	"Yaaron Sab Dua Karo"
Aditya Narayan	"Pehla Nasha"
Mika Singh	"Lover Boy"
Aditya Narayan	"Tattad Tattad", "Main Nikla Gaddi Leke"
Aditya Narayan, Shreya Ghoshal & the Top 5 finalists	"Pyaar Ke Pal"

== Elimination chart ==
Like last season, this season too, bi-weekly eliminations were held. One week public votes, next week, judges' scores. The bottom contestants are decided according to the judges' scores from that week, and the person with lowest votes from last week is eliminated.

Winner
Runner-up
Third place
Fourth place
Sixth place
Did not perform
Saved by the judges scores
Bottom two or three
Eliminated

Indian Idol season 15 – Eliminations
Contestant	Pl.	Top 34		Top 16	Top 15	Top 14	Top 13	Top 12	Top 11	Top 10	Top 8	Top 6
Contestant	Pl.	Theatre		Gala 2+3	Gala 4+5	Gala 6+7	Gala 8+9	Gala 10+11	Gala 12+13+14+15	Gala 16+17	Gala 18+19+20	Gala 21+24
Contestant	Pl.	9/11	10/11	23/11–1/12	7/12–15/12	21/12–29/12	4/1–12/1	18/1–26/1	1/2–23/2	1/3–9/3	15/3–22/3	23/3–6/4
Manasi Ghosh	1	N/A	Safe	Safe	Safe	Safe	Safe	Safe	Safe	Safe	Safe	Winner
Subhajit Chakraborty	2	Safe	N/A	Safe	Safe	Safe	Bottom three	Safe	Bottom three	Safe	Safe	Runner-up
Sneha Shankar	3	N/A	N/A	Safe	Safe	Safe	Safe	Bottom three	Safe	Safe	Safe	Third place
Chaitanya Devadhe (Mauli)	4	Safe	N/A	Safe	Safe	Safe	Safe	Safe	Safe	Safe	Safe	Fourth places
Priyangshu Dutta	4	N/A	Safe	Safe	Safe	Safe	Safe	Safe	Bottom three	Safe	Safe	Fourth places
Anirudh Suswaram	6	N/A	Safe	Bottom three	Safe	Safe	Safe	Safe	Safe	Bottom three	Bottom three	Sixth place
Myscmme Bosu	7	N/A	Safe	Safe	Safe	Safe	Safe	Safe	Safe	Safe	Eliminated	
Ragini Shinde	7	N/A	Safe	Safe	Safe	Safe	Safe	Safe	Safe	Safe	Eliminated	
Biswarup Banerjee	9	N/A	Safe	Safe	Safe	Safe	Safe	Safe	Safe	Eliminated		
Ritika Raj	9	Safe	N/A	Safe	Bottom three	Bottom two	Bottom three	Safe	Safe	Eliminated		
Mayuri Saha	11	N/A	N/A	Safe	Safe	Safe	Safe	Bottom three	Eliminated			
Ranjini Sen Gupta	12	Safe	N/A	Safe	Safe	Safe	Safe	Eliminated				
Srijan Porail	13	N/A	N/A	Safe	Safe	Safe	Eliminated					
Jyotiprakash Ojha	14	Safe	N/A	Bottom three	Bottom three	Eliminated						
Vastav Kumar	15	Safe	N/A	Safe	Eliminated							
Ipsit Pati	16	Safe	N/A	Eliminated								
Kritwika Chakraborty		N/A	Eliminated									
Tajinder Singh		N/A	Eliminated									
Manav Heera		N/A	Eliminated									
Vishnumaya Ramesh		N/A	Eliminated									
Poushali Bhattacharya		N/A	Eliminated									
Inayat Kaur Bajaj		N/A	Eliminated									
Dilraj Singh		N/A	Eliminated									
Abid Khan Langa		N/A	Eliminated									
Haarshita Medhi		N/A	Eliminated									
Sudhanshu Khare		N/A	Eliminated									
Ayushman Chaudhary		N/A	Eliminated									
Mansi Sisodiya		Elimimated										
Prativa Dutta		Elimimated										
Neha Dixit		Elimimated										
Saloni Saaz		Elimimated										
Radha Srivastava		Elimimated										
Lakshya Mehta		Elimimated										
Shuja Gowhar		Elimimated										

== Reception and ratings ==
Reception comments posted on SET's Instagram.

The season's premiere episode was reviewed by Pinkvilla, and Gujarat Samachar.

=== Television ratings and episode guide ===
Ep. No.	Original airdate	Event	Title	Ratings	Reach %	SET India Weekly Rank	Overall Rank	Ref.
Ep. No.	Original airdate	Event	Title	15–50		SET India Weekly Rank	Overall Rank	
1	Saturday, 26 October 2024	Auditions 1	'Indian Idol Ke Stage Par Hone Ke Haqdaar'	1.3	3.7	#1	#15	
2	Sunday, 27 October 2024	Auditions 2	'Agle Idol ki Talaash'	1.3	3.7	#1	#15	
3	Saturday, 2 November 2024	Auditions 3	'Day 3 of Season 15 Auditions'	1.0	3.1	#1	#23	
4	Sunday, 3 November 2024	Auditions 4	'Day 4 of Season 15 Auditions'	1.0	3.1	#1	#23	
5	Saturday, 9 November 2024	Theatre Round 1	'Theatre Round - Day 1'	1.0	3.3	#1	#22	
6	Sunday, 10 November 2024	Theatre Round 2	'Theatre Round - Day 2'	1.0	3.3	#1	#22	
7	Saturday, 16 November 2024	Gala 1 - Night 1	'Grand Musical Explosion'	1.1	3.4	#1	#22	
8	Sunday, 17 November 2024	Gala 1 - Night 2	'Grand Musical Explosion Part 2'	1.1	3.4	#1	#22	
9	Saturday, 23 November 2024	Gala 2 - Night 1	"An Evening With Subhash Ghai"	1.2	3.4	#1	#18	
10	Sunday, 24 November 2024	Gala 2 - Night 2	"A Night of Nostalgia with Mahesh Bhatt"	1.2	3.4	#1	#18	
11	Saturday, 30 November 2024	Gala 3 - Night 1	"Fearless Feroz"	1.1	3.3	#1	#20	
12	Sunday, 1 December 2024	Gala 3 - Night 2	"Bebak Nana"	1.1	3.3	#1	#20	
13	Saturday, 7 December 2024	Gala 4 - Night 1	"Celebrating 1 Year of Animal"	1.0	3.1	#1	#24	
14	Sunday, 8 December 2024	Gala 4 - Night 2	"Happy Birthday Vishal"	1.0	3.1	#1	#24	
15	Saturday, 14 December 2024	Gala 5 - Night 1	Celebrating 100 Years of Raj Kapoor -Part 1	1.1	3.4	#1	#22	
16	Sunday, 15 December 2024	Gala 5 - Night 2	Celebrating 100 Years of Raj Kapoor -Part 2	1.1	3.4	#1	#22	
17	Saturday, 21 December 2024	Gala 6 - Night 1	'Christmas Concert - Part 1'	1.0	3.5	#2	#25	
18	Sunday, 22 December 2024	Gala 6 - Night 2	'Christmas Concert - Part 2'	1.0	3.5	#2	#25	
19	Saturday, 28 December 2024	Gala 7 - Night 1	'90s Celebration'	1.1	3.4	#1	#19	
20	Sunday, 29 December 2024	Gala 7 - Night 2	'90s Celebration - Part 2'	1.1	3.4	#1	#19	
21	Saturday, 4 January 2025	Gala 8 - Night 1	'Celebrating Greatest Love Songs - Part 1'	1.0	3.2	#1	#25	
22	Sunday, 5 January 2025	Gala 8 - Night 2	'Celebrating Greatest Love Songs - Part 2'	1.0	3.2	#1	#25	
23	Saturday, 11 January 2025	Gala 9 - Night 1	'2025 Ka Superhit Start'	1.0	3.4	#1	#22	
24	Sunday, 12 January 2025	Gala 9 - Night 2	'Sensational 70s'	1.0	3.4	#1	#22	
25	Saturday, 18 January 2025	Gala 10 - Night 1		0.9	3.1	#1	#24	
26	Sunday, 19 January 2025	Gala 10 - Night 2		0.9	3.1	#1	#24	
27	Saturday, 25 January 2025	Gala 11 - Night 1		0.9	2.9	#1	#25	
28	Sunday, 26 January 2025	Gala 11 - Night 2		1.2	2.9	#1	#25	
29	Saturday, 1 February 2025	Gala 12 - Night 1		0.9	3.3	#1	#25	
30	Sunday, 2 February 2025	Gala 12 - Night 2		1.0	3.3	#1	#25	
31	Saturday, 8 February 2025	Gala 13 - Night 1		1.1	3.2	#1	#21	
32	Sunday, 9 February 2025	Gala 13 - Night 2		1.1	3.2	#1	#21	
33	Saturday, 15 February 2025	Gala 14 - Night 1		1.1	3.2	#1	#20	
34	Sunday, 16 February 2025	Gala 14 - Night 2		1.2	3.2	#1	#20	
35	Saturday, 22 February 2025	Gala 15 - Night 1		0.9	2.8	#1	#29	
36	Sunday, 23 February 2025	Gala 15 - Night 2		0.6	2.8	#1	#29	
37	Saturday, 1 March 2025	Gala 16 - Night 1		0.8	2.7	#1	#29	
38	Sunday, 2 March 2025	Gala 16 - Night 2		0.7	2.7	#1	#29	
39	Saturday, 8 March 2025	Gala 17 - Night 1	"Holi with Hema Malini - Part 1"	0.9	2.4	#1	#35	
40	Sunday, 9 March 2025	Gala 17 - Night 2	"Holi with Hema Malini - Part 2"	0.4	2.4	#1	#35	
41	Saturday, 15 March 2025	Gala 18	"Happy Birthday Shreya"	0.7	2.7	#1	#26	
42	Sunday, 16 March 2025	Gala 19	"Sunny Deol Special"	0.8	2.7	#1	#26	
43	Saturday, 22 March 2025	Gala 20	"Semi-Finals with Karan Johar - Part 1"	0.6	2.5	#1	#30	
44	Sunday, 23 March 2025	Gala 21	"Semi-Finals with Karan Johar - Part 2"	0.7	2.5	#1	#30	
45	Saturday, 29 March 2025	Gala 23	"Top 6 – Race to Finale - Part 1"	0.6	2.4	#1	#31	
46	Sunday, 30 March 2025	Gala 24	"Race to Finale - Part 2"	0.7	2.4	#1	#31	
47	Saturday, 5 April 2025	Gala 25 - Night 1		0.8	3.0	#1	#22	
48	Saturday, 6 April 2025	Gala 25 - Night 2		1.0	3.0	#1	#22	

== Production ==
The project head for the season was Chitra Langeh, and Akash Tiwari once again joining as the head of production. Pratyush Prakash was once again the writer of the series. Music guidance and music band were headed by Anand Sharma and Randeep Bhaskar. Aradhana Bhola, the managing director of FremantleIndia was once again the executive producer of the series. The season was directed by Saahil Chhabria.
