= Jyotirmayee Nayak =

Odia playback singer (born 2001)

- Born: 14 February 2001 (age 25); Kolkata, West Bengal, India
- Occupation: Playback Singer
- Years active: 2014–present
- Known for: Indian Idol (Hindi TV series) season 16
- Parents: Chakradhar Nayak (father); Gouri Nayak (mother)

Jyotirmayee Nayak (born 14 February 2001) is an Indian playback singer and the winner of the Indian Idol 16. She started her career as a Bhajana singer, and later participated in the music-based reality show Voice of Odisha Junior, aired on Tarang TV in 2014-15. As of 2026, she has sung over 1,000 Odia songs and has also lent her voice in some Odia films.

== Biography ==
Nayak was born on February 14, 2001 in Balasore to Chakradhar Nayak and Gauri Nayak. After her birth, the family shifted to Rourkela and then to Bhubaneswar, he started formal training in music under Buddha Prasad Rao when she was in the fourth standard and acquired the basic knowledge of Hindustani classical music. Later, she furthered her training in Bhubaneswar under Devendra Satapathy.

She received her music training along with her academic studies at Delhi Public School, Kalinga, Bhubaneswar. After completing her schooling, she graduated in Computer Science and Engineering. In 2023, she completed a certificate course in music therapy from the Chennai School of Music Therapy and was able to integrate music with healing. She started working as a music therapist for cancer patients.

== Career ==
She first sang spiritual songs. She had recorded a bhajan for composers Om Prakash Mohanty and Laxmikant Palit. She has sung many bhajans. In 2014, she participated in the reality show Voice of Odisha Junior aired on Tarang TV and came fourth.

She made her playback debut in 2018 with the film Ishq Puni Thare, lending her voice to two consecutive songs that became hits: “Rakhithibu Saiti Kari” and “Tora Udi Gala” directed by Prem Anand. After that, she has recorded numerous songs for Odia films, albums, and devotional collections.

=== Indian Idol ===
In 2025, she participated in the 16th edition of the Indian reality show Indian Idol (Hindi TV series) season 16 and won the final title on 26 July 2026. He had previously participated in Indian Idol Junior and finished in 26th place.
