= Indian Idol (Hindi TV series) season 16 =

Indian TV series

Indian Idol
- Season 16
- Hosted by: Udit Narayan (Guest Host till Theatre and on-stage guide); Aditya Narayan (Host); Haarsh Limbachiyaa (guest)
- Judges: Badshah; Shreya Ghoshal; Vishal Dadlani
- No. of contestants: 18
- Winner: Jyotirmayee Nayak
- Runner-up: Tanishk Shukla
- No. of episodes: 82

Release
- Original network: Sony Entertainment Television
- Original release: 18 October 2025 – 26 July 2026

Season chronology
- ← Previous; Season 15

The sixteenth season of Indian Idol premiered on 18 October 2025, on Sony Entertainment Television. Shreya Ghoshal, Vishal Dadlani and Badshah returned from season 15 as judges. This season went on to become the longest-running season in the show’s history. The theme of this season was "Yaadon Ki Playlist" (Playlist of Memories). Indian Idol Season 16 Grand Finale has arrived on the 25th and 26th of July this year in 2026.

This was the longest running season of Indian Idol.

== Audition ==
Remote auditions took place from 26 July to 24 August 2025, as well as a number of open-call auditions, and from these, the producers selected the contestants who were then invited to audition in front of the judges.

Indian Idol (season 16) – regional auditions
City	Audition date	Venue
Kolkata, West Bengal	26 July 2025	SPK Jain Futuristic Institute, New Town
New Delhi	17 August 2025	Central Academy School, Sector 10, Dwarka
Mumbai, Maharashtra	24 August 2025	Pawar Public School

== Theatre round ==
The Theatre round featured the top 25 golden ticket holder contestants performing for the judges. This round was filmed on X, at the Lata Mangeshkar Auditorium, and aired on 1 and 2 November 2025. The judges then narrowed the number of contestants down to 16, including the platinum mic holders.

The contestants performed in batches, as picked by the judges according to genre.

The following is a list of the contestants and the song they performed. Contestants are listed in the order they performed.

Color key:

This contestant advanced to top 16.
This contestant was eliminated.

Day 1–1 November 2025
Order	Contestant	Batch	Song	Result
1	Ankita Pradhan	1	"Aao Na Gale Laga Lo Na"	Top 16
2	Amritha Rajan	2	"Kay Sera Sera"	Top 16
3	Banashree Biswas	3	"Ab Ke Sajan Sawaan Mein"	Top 16
4	Shreenidhi Shastry	3	"Ay Hairathe"	Top 16
5	Arfin Rana	3	"Jaane Kya Jaane Mann"	Top 16
6	Tabish Ali	4	"Tumhe Dillagi Bhul Jani Padegi"	Eliminated
7	Manav	4	"Mast Kalandar"	Top 16
8	Lakshya Mehta	5	"Bheege Hont Tere"	Eliminated
9	Premika Jain	6	Tumhe Jo Maine Dekha	Eliminated
10	Kalyan Sahay	6	Yeh Dil Tum Bin Kahin Lagta Nahi	Eliminated
11	Anurag Bhattacharya	6	Megha Re Megha Re	Eliminated

Day 2–2 November 2025
Order	Contestant	Batch	Song	Result
1	Sugandha Date	7	"Hum Dil De Chuke Sanam"	Top 16
2	Aaroh Shankar	8	"Kaun Hai Jo Sapnon Mein Aaya"	Eliminated
3	Dharmesh Nayat	9	"Abhi Mujh Mein Kahin"	Eliminated
4	Abhijit Sharma	10	"Tumne Mujhe Dekha Hokar Meherban"	Top 16
5	Shreya Verma	10	"Ni Mein Samajh Gayi"	Top 16
6	Suhail	11	"Ye Tune Kya Kiya"	Top 16
7	Tanishk Shukla	12	"Tum Jo Mil Gaye Ho"	Top 16
8	Jyotirmayee Nayak	13	"Saiyan Pakad Baiyan"	Top 16
9	Vishal Mattu	14	"Ilahi"	Eliminated
10	Jayanti Dutta	14	"Bahut Pyar Karte Hain"	Eliminated
11	Sankalp Yaduwanshi	15	"Ae Dil Hai Mushkil"	Eliminated
12	Vishwanath Haveri	Not telecast		Eliminated
13	Aakarshit Wadhwan	Not telecast		Eliminated
14	Hrishikesh Karmarkar	Not telecast		Eliminated

== Top 18 contestants ==
The contestant who made past the theatre round or got the platinum mic in the auditions, are listed below as follows:

Myscmme Bosu and Chaitanya Devadhe were wildcard entrants.

Position	Contestant	Status
1	Jyotirmayee Nayak	Winner
2	Tanishk Shukla	1st Runner-Up
3	Manraj Veer Singh	2nd Runner-Up
4	Suhail	3rd Runner-Up
5	Anshika Chonkar	4th Runner-Up
6	Myscmme Bosu	Eliminated on 26 July 2026
7	Chaitanya Devadhe (Mauli)	Eliminated on 12 July 2026
8	Abhishek Kumar	Eliminated on 28 June 2026
9	Ankita Mahua Giri	Eliminated on 14 June 2026
9	Diwakar Choubey	Eliminated on 14 June 2026
11	Amritha Rajan	Eliminated on 29 March 2026
12	Shreenidhi Shastry	Eliminated on 8 March 2026
13	Sugandha Date	Eliminated on 15 February 2026
14	Shreya Verma	Eliminated on 1 February 2026
15	Abhijeet Sharma	Eliminated on 18 January 2026
16	Banashree Biswas	Eliminated on 21 December 2025
17	Manav	Eliminated on 7 December 2025
18	Arfin Rana	Eliminated on 23 November 2025

== Gala rounds ==
After the theater round, every week all the contestants performing in the gala and are eliminated on a weekly basis.

The gala rounds were filmed at the Yash Raj Studios.

Colour Key:

This contestant was saved by the judges' scores.
This contestant was in the bottom as per judges scores.
This contestant was eliminated.
This contestant won Indian Idol.
This contestant was the runner-up.
This contestant finished in third place.
This contestant finished in fourth place.
This contestant finished in sixth place.

=== Gala 1: Top 16 – Premiere Party ===
There was no public voting this week and the performance did not count in the competition. Contestants are listed in the order they performed.

Top 16 (8–9 November)
Contestant	Performed on	Song
Arfin Rana	Night 1	"Ek Sanam Chahiye Aashiqui Ke Liye"
Anshika Chonkar	Night 1	"Rangeela Re"
Manraj Veer Singh	Night 1	"Ruk Ja O Dil Deewane"
Diwakar Choubey	Night 1	"Chaiyya Chaiyya"
Abhishek Kumar	Night 1	"Tadap Tadap Ke Is Dil"
Shreya Verma	Night 1	"Taare Hain Baraati"
Abhijit Sharma	Night 1	"Yeh Dil Deewana"
Sugandha Date	Night 1	"Morni Baga Ma Bole"
Jyotirmayee Nayak	Night 2	"Aisi Deewangi"
Amritha Rajan	Night 2	"Kehna Hi Kya"
Manav	Night 2	"Ishq Di Galli Vich Dolna"
Tanishk Shukla	Night 2	"Deewana Tera"
Shreenidhi Shastry	Night 2	"Tum Dil Ki Dhadkan Mein"
Suhail	Night 2	"Mera Piya Ghar Aaya O Ramji"
Ankita Pradhan	Night 2	"Too Shayar Hai Main Teri Shayari"
Banashree Biswas	Night 2	"Pardesi Pardesi Jaana Nahin"

=== Gala 2: Top 16 – Two Themes special ===
This week was divided into two themes. This week was the first public voting week of the season. Contestants are listed in the order they performed.

Top 16 (15–16 November)
Contestant	Performed on	Song
Arfin Rana	Night 1	"Mere Naam Tu"
Manraj Veer Singh	Night 1	"Zara Sa" and "Khuda Jaane" (With Shilpa Rao)
Anshika Chonkar	Night 1	"Desi Girl"
Diwakar Choubey	Night 1	"Tere Mast Mast Do Nain"
Banashree Biswas	Night 1	"Tujhe Yaad Na Meri Aayee"
Suhail	Night 1	"Mere Rashke Kamar"
Ankita Pradhan	Night 1	"Aaj Ki Raat"
Shreya Verma	Night 1	"Darling"
Jyotirmayee Nayak	Night 1	"Moh Moh Ke Dhaage"
Shreenidhi Shastry	Night 2	"Lakshya"
Abhijit Sharma	Night 2	"Señorita"
Tanishk Shukla	Night 2	"Tanhayee"
Sugandha Date	Night 2	"Sajna Ji Vaari Vaari"
Amritha Rajan	Night 2	"Tum Ho Toh" and "Socha Hai"
Abhishek Kumar	Night 2	"O Rangrez"
Manav	Night 2	"Slow Motion Angreza"

=== Gala 3: Top 16 – Two Themes special ===
This week was the first judges' score week and the first elimination took place on basis of last week's votes and this week's scores. This week also was divided into two themes. Contestants are listed in the order they performed.

Top 16 (22-23 November)
Contestant	Performed On	Song	Result (Gala 1+2+3)
Arfin Rana	Night 1	"Is Tarah Aashiqui Ka"	Eliminated
Abhijit Sharma	Night 1	"Shehar Ki Ladki"	Safe
Jyotirmayee Nayak	Night 1	"Ankhiyon Se Goli Maare"	Bottom four
Manav	Night 1	"Jeeta Hoon Jiske Liye"	Safe
Manraj Veer Singh	Night 1	"Chalo Ishq Ladaaye"	Safe
Amritha Rajan	Night 1	"Hungama Ho Gaya"	Safe
Ankita Pradhan	Night 1	"Kabhi Tu Chhalia Lagta Hai"	Safe
Abhishek Kumar	Night 1	"Naina"	Safe
Tanishk Shukla	Night 2	"Jhanjharia"	Bottom four
Sugandha Date	Night 2	"Main Albeli"	Safe
Anshika Chonkar	Night 2	"What Is Mobile Number" and "Husn Hai Suhana"	Safe
Suhail	Night 2	"Kitna Pyaare Tujhe Rabne Banaya"	Safe
Diwakar Choubey	Night 2	"Main Toh Raste Se Ja Raha Tha"	Safe
Shreya Verma	Night 2	"Sona Kitna Sona Hai"	Safe
Banashree Biswas	Night 2	"Aaye Ho Meri Zindagi Mein"	Bottom four
Shreenidhi Shastry	Night 2	"Phoolon Sa Chehra Tera"	Safe

=== Gala 4: Top 15 – Two Themes special ===
This week was the second public voting week of the season. Contestants are listed in the order they performed.

Top 15 (29–30 November)
Contestant	Performed on	Song
Sugandha Date	Night 1	"Chunari Chunari"
Abhijit Sharma	Night 1	"Suno Na Suno Na"
Tanishk Shukla	Night 1	"Ole Ole"
Anshika Chonkar	Night 1	"Dhoom Taana"
Shreya Verma	Night 1	"Zara Sa Jhoom Loon Main"
Amritha Rajan	Night 1	"Raat Ka Nasha"
Diwakar Choubey	Night 1	"Main Khiladi Tu Anari"
Shreenidhi Shastry	Night 2	"Mere Rang Mein"
Ankita Pradhan	Night 2	"Saat Samundar"
Manraj Veer Singh	Night 2	"Pehla Nasha"
Suhail	Night 2	"Chaap Tilak"
Jyotimayee Nayak	Night 2	"Dil Deewana"
Abhishek Kumar	Night 2	"Main Koi Aisa Geet Gaoon"
Banashree Biswas	Night 2	"Waada Raha Sanam"
Manav	Night 2	"Oopar Khuda Neeche Aasman"

=== Gala 5: Top 15 – Two Themes special ===
This week was the second judges' score week and the second elimination took place on basis of last week's votes and this week's scores. Contestants are listed in the order they performed.

Top 15 (6–7 December)
Contestant	Performed on	Song	Result (Gala 4+5)
Banashree Biswas	Night 1	"Maar Diya Jaaye and Parde Mein Rehne Do"	Bottom three
Abhijit Sharma	Night 1	"Dream Girl and Na Jaa"	Bottom three
Jyotirmayee Nayak	Night 1	"Mein Tere Ishq Mein and Khathuba"	Safe
Ankita Pradhan	Night 1	"Rahe Na Rahe Hum and Jab Tak Hai Jaan"	Safe
Abhishek Kumar	Night 1	"Yeh Dil Tum Bin and Rafta Rafta"	Safe
Amritha Rajan	Night 1	"Aap Ki Nazron Ne Samjha and Bangle Ke Peeche"	Safe
Manav	Night 1	"Bagon Ke Har Phool"	Eliminated
Sugandha Date	Night 2	"Piya Tu Ab To Aaja"	Safe
Suhail	Night 2	"Aaya Tere Dar Par Deewana"	Safe
Diwakar Choubey	Night 2	"Afghan Jalebi"	Safe
Manraj Veer Singh	Night 2	"Kya Mujhe Pyaar Hai"	Safe
Anshika Chonkar	Night 2	"Na Jaane Koi Kaisi Hai Yeh Zindagaani"	Safe
Tanishk Shukla	Night 2	"Aaj Mausam Bada Beimaan Hai"	Safe
Shreenidhi Shastry	Night 2	"Chanda Re Chanda Re Kabhi Toh Zameen Par"	Safe
Shreya Verma	Night 2	"Billo Rani"	Safe

=== Gala 6: Top 14 – Super Hit Jodi ===
This week was the third public voting week of the season. Contestants are listed in the order they performed.

Top 14 (13–14 December)
Contestant	Performed on	Song
Ankita Pradhan, Abhishek Kumar	Night 1	"Rim Jhim Rim Jhim"
Shreya Verma, Suhail	Night 1	"Sajdaa"
Jyotirmayee Nayak, Shreenidhi Shastry	Night 1	"Bole Chudiyan"
Amritha Rajan, Tanishk Shukla	Night 1	"Bin Tere Sanam"
Manraj Veer Singh, Diwakar Choubey	Night 1	"Mujhse Shaadi Karogi", "Do You Wanna Partner"
Anshika Chonkar, Diwakar Choubey	Night 1	"Dhak Dhak Karne Laga"
Shreya Verma, Abhijeet Sharma	Night 1	"Tamma Tamma", "Chumma Chumma"
Banashree Biswas, Suhail	Night 2	"Ladki Badi Anjaani"
Sugandha Date, Shreenidhi Shastry	Night 2	"Woh Ladki Hai Kahan"
Anshika Chonkar, Manraj Veer Singh	Night 2	"Koi Mil Gaya", "Koi Mil Gaya"
Amritha Rajan, Ankita Pradhan	Night 2	"Dola Re Dola"
Jyotirmayee Nayak, Tanishk Shukla	Night 2	"Kaho Naa Pyaar Hai"
Sugandha Date, Abhishek Kumar	Night 2	"Chaand Chupa Badal Mein"
Banashree Biswas, Abhijeet Sharma	Night 2	"Dil To Pagal Hai"

=== Gala 7: Top 14 – Celebrating The Lady Dons ===
This week was the third judges's score week and the third elimination took place on basis of last week's votes and this week's scores. Contestants are listed in the order they performed.

Top 14 (20–21 December)
Contestant	Performed on	Song	Result (Gala 6+7)
Banashree Biswas	Night 1	"Panna Ki Tamanna"	Eliminated
Abhishek Kumar	Night 1	"Ke Pag Ghungroo"	Safe
Jyotirmayee Nayak	Night 1	"Aap Jaisa Koi and Laila O Laila"	Safe
Amritha Rajan	Night 1	"Ye Mera Dil Yaar Ka Deewana"	Safe
Shreenidhi Shastry	Night 1	"Meri Sohni Meri Tamanna"	Safe
Tanishk Shukla	Night 1	"O Meri Mehbooba" and "Janu Meri Jaan" (on request)	Safe
Sugandha Date	Night 1	"Aa Jaane Jaan and Aaj Ki Raat Koi Aane Ko"	Safe
Abhijeet Sharma	Night 2	"Ek Ajnabee Haseena Se"	Bottom three
Anshika Chonkar	Night 2	"Dum Maro Dum and Bhool Bhulaiyaa"	Safe
Manraj Veer Singh	Night 2	"Apni to Jaise Taise"	Bottom three
Shreya Verma	Night 2	"Mera Naam Chin Chin Chu and O Haseena Zulfon Wali"	Safe
Diwakar Choubey	Night 2	"Mehbooba O Mehbooba"	Safe
Ankita Pradhan	Night 2	"Chura Liya Hai Tumne Jo Dil Ko and Karle Pyaar Karle"	Safe
Suhail	Night 2	"Der Na Ho Jaye Kahin"	Safe

=== Gala 8: Top 13 - An Evening of Melody ===
This week was the fourth public voting week of the season. Contestants are listed in the order they performed.

Top 13 (27–28 December)
Contestant	Performed on	Song
Jyotirmayee Nayak	Night 1	"Ek Do Teen"
Amritha Rajan	Night 1	"Aaj Ki Raat Maza Husn Ka"
Shreenidhi Shastry	Night 1	"Jhoom Barabar Jhoom"
Abhishek Kumar	Night 1	"Om Shanti Om"
Shreya Verma	Night 1	"Main Aayi Hoon U.P. Bihar Lootne"
Suhail	Night 1	"Dangal"
Ankita Pradhan	Night 1	"Gali Gali Mein Phirta Hai and Hari Om Hari"
Abhijeet Sharma	Night 2	"Bachna Ae Haseeno and Na Na Na Na Re"
Manraj Veer Singh	Night 2	"Badtameez Dil and Ho Jayegi Balle Balle"
Sugandha Date	Night 2	"Raat Baki and Rambha Ho Ho Ho"
Diwakar Choubey	Night 2	"Jiya Tu"
Tanishk Shukla	Night 2	"Badan Pe Sitaare"
Anshika Chonkar	Night 2	"Jaan-E-Jaan, O Meri Jaan-E-Jaan, Nisha Nisha Nisha"

=== Gala 9: Top 13 – New Year Celebrations ===
This week was the fourth public voting week of the season. Contestants are listed in the order they performed.

Top 13 (3–4 January)
Contestant	Performed on	Song
Abhijeet Sharma	Night 1	"Hoga Tumse Pyara Kaun"
Manraj Veer Singh	Night 1	"Dil Lena Khel Hai Dildar Ka"
Jyotirmayee Nayak	Night 1	"Sohni Meri Sohni (Rab Mujhe Maaf Kare)"
Shreenidhi Shastry	Night 1	"Chhod Aaye Hum"
Anshika Chonkar	Night 1	"Tu Tu Hai Wahi (Yeh Vaada Raha)"
Sugandha Date	Night 1	"Yeh Galiyan Yeh Chaubara"
Ankita Pradhan	Night 1	"Puchho Na Yaar Kya Hua"
Abhishek Kumar	Night 2	"Ae Zindagi Gale Laga Le"
Suhail	Night 2	"Chappa Chappa"
Shreya Verma	Night 2	"Zindagi Pyar Ka Geet Hai"
Diwakar Choubey	Night 2	"Meri Kismat Mein Tu Nahi Shayad and Sapne Mein Milti Hai"
Tanishk Shukla	Night 2	"O Priya Priya"
Amritha Rajan	Night 2	"Gapoochi Gapoochi Gam Gam"

=== Gala 10: Top 13 – Filmy And Fabulous ===
This week was the fifth public voting week of the season. Contestants are listed in the order they performed.

Top 13 (10–11 January)
Contestant	Performed on	Song
Abhijeet Sharma	Night 1	"Mast Baharon Ka Main Aashiq"
Jyotirmayee Nayak	Night 1	"Sheesha Ho Ya Dil Ho"
Shreenidhi Shastry	Night 1	"Pyar Ka Tohfa Tera Bana Hai Jeevan Mera"
Suhail	Night 1	"Haal Kya Hai Dilon Ka"
Manraj Veer Singh	Night 1	"Inteha Ho Gayi Intezar Ki"
Ankita Pradhan	Night 1	"Kitne Bhi Tu Kar Le Sitam"
Sugandha Date	Night 2	"Dafliwale Dafli Baja"
Amritha Rajan	Night 2	"Disco Station"
Abhishek Kumar	Night 2	"Lo Sahib Phir Bhool Gayi Mein"
Anshika Chonkar	Night 2	"Mujhe Naulakha Manga De"
Tanishk Shukla	Night 2	"Chhalka Yeh Jaam"
Diwakar Choubey	Night 2	"De De Pyaar De"
Shreya Verma	Night 2	"Ja Re Ja O Harjaee"

=== Gala 11: Top 13 – 75 Years Of Disco King ===
This week was the fourth judges's score week and the fourth elimination took place on basis of last three week's votes and this week's scores. Contestants are listed in the order they performed.

Top 13 (17–18 January)
Contestant	Performed on	Song	Result (Gala 8–11)
Abhijeet Sharma	Night 1	"Yaar Bina Chain Kahan Re"	Eliminated
Shreenidhi Shastry	Night 1	"Julie Julie Johnny Ka Dil Tumpe Aaya"	Safe
Abhishek Kumar	Night 1	"Zeehale Muskin Makun ba-Ranjish"	Safe
Ankita Pradhan	Night 1	"Jhoom Jhoom Jhoom Baba"	Safe
Anshika Chonkar	Night 1	"Jimmy Jimmy Aaja"	Safe
Amritha Rajan	Night 1	"Koi Yahan Nache Nache"	Bottom three
Jyotirmayee Nayak	Night 2	"Jawani Jan-E-Man"	Safe
Suhail	Night 2	"Kisi Nazar Ko Tera Intezar Aaj Bhi Hai"	Safe
Tanishk Shukla	Night 2	"Tumse Milkar Na Jane Kyun"	Bottom three
Sugandha Date	Night 2	"Zooby Zooby" and "Sochna Kya"	Safe
Manraj Veer Singh	Night 2	"Yaad Aa Raha Hai"	Safe
Diwakar Choubey	Night 2	"I Am A Disco Dancer"	Safe
Shreya Verma	Night 2	"Hari Om Hari"	Safe

=== Gala 12: Top 12 – Three Themes Special ===
This week was the sixth public voting week of the season. Contestants are listed in the order they performed.

Top 12 (23–25 January)
Contestant	Performed on	Song
Shreya Verma	Night 1	"Akhiyaan Milaoon Kabhi"
Abhishek Kumar	Night 1	"Tere Liye Hum Hai Jiye"
Suhail	Night 1	"Tujh Mein Rab Dikhta Hai"
Anshika Chonkar	Night 1	"Chamma Chamma"
Tanishk Shukla	Night 1	"Sandese Aate Hai"
Sugandha Date	Night 1	"Luka Chuppi"
Amritha Rajan	Night 2	"Roobaroo"
Jyotirmayee Nayak	Night 2	"I Love My India"
Manraj Veer Singh	Night 2	"Chak De! India"
Diwakar Choubey	Night 2	"Sultan"
Ankita Pradhan	Night 2	"Agar Tum Mil Jao"
Shreenidhi Shastry	Night 2	"O Saiyyan"
Jyotirmayee Nayak	Night 3	"Aye Watan Tere Liye"
Manraj Veer Singh	Night 3	"Rang De Basanti"
Sugandha Date	Night 3	"Suno Gaur Se Duniyawalo (Sabse Aage Hindustani)"
Tanishk Shukla	Night 3	"Ab Tumhare Hawale Watan Sathiyo"
Shreenidhi Shastry	Night 3	"Maa Tujhe Salaam"
Suhail	Night 3	"Maula Mere Le Le Meri Jaan"
Anshika Chonkar	Night 3	"It's the Time to Disco"
Abhishek Kumar	Night 3	"Mera Rang De Basanti Chola"
Ankita Pradhan	Night 3	"Ae Watan"
Amritha Rajan	Night 3	"Aashayein"
Diwakar Choubey	Night 3	"Chunar"
Shreya Verma	Night 3	"Jiya Re"

=== Gala 13: Top 12 – Season of Love with Neelam ===
This week was the fifth judges's score week and the fifth elimination took place on basis of last two weeks' votes and this week's scores. Contestants are listed in the order they performed.

Top 12 (31 January – 1 February)
Contestant	Performed on	Song	Result (Gala 12–13)
Ankita Pradhan	Night 1	"Kabhi Neem Neem"	Safe
Suhail	Night 1	"Koi Jaane Koi Na Jaane"	Safe
Tanishk Shukla	Night 1	"Suraj Hua Maddham"	Safe
Diwakar Choubey and Jyotirmayee Nayak	Night 1	"Ek Main Aur Ekk Tu"	
Manraj Veer Singh	Night 1	"Ye Kaali Kaali Aankhen"	Safe
Sugandha Date	Night 1	"Duniya Mein Logon Ko"	Bottom three
Ankita Pradhan and Tanishk Shukla	Night 1	"Teri Bindiya Re"	
Shreya Verma	Night 1	"Pyaar To Hona Hi Tha"	Eliminated
Sugandha Date and Shreenidhi Shastry	Night 2	"Mera Dil Bhi Kitna Pagal Hai"	
Shreenidhi Shastry	Night 2	"Bahon Ke Darmiyan"	Safe
Jyotirmayee Nayak	Night 2	"Aap Ke Aa Jaane Se"	Bottom three
Anshika Chonkar	Night 2	"Hawa Hawai"	Safe
Diwakar Choubey	Night 2	"Ramta Jogi"	Safe
Amritha Rajan	Night 2	"Gazar Ne Kiya Hai Ishara"	Safe
Abhishek Kumar	Night 2	"Aaj Ibaadat"	Safe
Anshika Chonkar and Manraj Veer Singh	Night 2	"Khullam Khulla Pyar Karenge Hum Dono"	

=== Gala 14: Top 11 – Remembering Lata Ji ===
This week was the seventh public voting week. Contestants are listed in the order they performed.

Top 11 (7–8 February)
Contestant	Performed on	Song
Amritha Rajan	Night 1	"Itna Na Mujhse Tu Pyar Badha"
Manraj Veer Singh	Night 1	"Muqaddar Ka Sikandar"
Sugandha Date	Night 1	"Hothon Mein Aisi Baat"
Tanishk Shukla and Jyotirmayee Nayak	Night 1	"Dekha Ek Khwab"
Anshika Chonkar	Night 1	"Jiska Mujhe Tha Intezaar"
Ankita Pradhan and Abhishek Kumar	Night 1	"Bekhudi Mein Sanam"
Abhishek Kumar	Night 1	"Akele Hain Chale Aao"
Shreenidhi Shastry	Night 2	"Tere Chehre Mein Woh Jaadu Hai"
Jyotirmayee Nayak	Night 2	"Solah Baras Ki Bali Umar Ko Salaam"
Shreenidhi Shastry and Sugandha Date	Night 2	"Yeh Raat Bheegi Bheegi"
Suhail	Night 2	"Dum Dum Diga Diga"
Ankita Pradhan	Night 2	"Dil To Hai Dil"
Tanishk Shukla	Night 2	"O Saathi Re Tere Bina Bhi Kya Jeena"
Diwakar Choubey	Night 2	"Are Diwano Mujhe Pehchano (Main Hoon Don)"

=== Gala 15: Top 11 – Yaadein with Subhash Ghai ===
This week was the sixth judges's score week and the sixth elimination took place on basis of last two weeks' votes and this week's scores. Contestants are listed in the order they performed.

Top 11 (14–15 February)
Contestant	Performed on	Song	Result (Gala 14+15)
Shreenidhi Shastry	Night 1	"Nahin Saamne Tu"	Bottom three
Diwakar Choubey	Night 1	"Khal Nayak Hoon Main"	Safe
Ankita Mahua Giri	Night 1	"Too Mera Hero Hai" and "Ding Dong"	Safe
Tanishk Shukla	Night 1	"Dard-E-Dil Dard-E-Jigar"	Safe
Jyotirmayee Nayak	Night 1	"Bada Dukh Dina O Ramji"	Bottom three
Anshika Chonkar	Night 1	"Lambi Judaai"	Safe
Manraj Veer Singh	Night 1	"Ek Hasina Thi Ek Diwana Tha"	Safe
Sugandha Date	Night 2	"Ishq Bina" and "Taal Se Taal"	Eliminated
Suhail	Night 2	"My Name Is Lakhan"	Safe
Amritha Rajan	Night 2	"Pyar Karne Wale Kabhi Darte Nahi" and "Jane Do, Jane Do, Mujhe Jana Hai"	Safe
Anshika Chonkar and Shreenidhi Shastry	Night 2	"Gawah Hai Chand Tare"	
Abhishek Kumar	Night 2	"Do Dil Mil Rahe Hain" and "Meri Mehbooba"	Safe
Abhishek Kumar and Ankita Mahua Giri	Night 2	"Jab Koyi Baat Bigad Jaye"	

=== Gala 16: Top 10 (Part 1) – Indian Idol Goes International ===
This week was the eight public voting week. Contestants are listed in the order they performed.

Top 10 (21–22 February)
Contestant	Performed on	Song
Shreenidhi Shastry and Anshika Chonkar	Night 1	"Chura Ke Dil Mera"
Suhail	Night 1	"Afreen Afreen"
Amritha Rajan	Night 1	"Masakali"
Abhishek Kumar	Night 1	"Binte Dil" and "Ainvayi Ainvayi"
Tanishk Shukla	Night 1	"Aaja Aaja Main Hoon Pyar Tera"
Diwakar Choubey	Night 1	"Yeh Jawaani Hai Deewani"
Tanishk Shukla and Jyotirmayee Nayak	Night 1	"Tere Mere Milan Ki Yeh Raina"
Ankita Mahua Giri	Night 2	"Jab Chhaye Mera Jadoo"
Manraj Veer Singh and Suhail	Night 2	"Gal Mitthi Mitthi"
Anshika Chonkar	Night 2	"Har Kisi Ko"
Manraj Veer Singh	Night 2	"Tu Hi Meri Shab Hai"
Jyotirmayee Nayak	Night 2	"Tum Jo Aaye Zindagi Mein"
Abhishek Kumar and Amritha Rajan	Night 2	"Aajkal Tere Mere Pyar Ke Charche"
Shreenidhi Shastry	Night 2	"Dekha Na Haye Re"

=== Gala 17: Top 10 (Part 1) – Two Themes Special ===
This week was divided into two themes

This week was the ninth public voting week. Contestants are listed in the order they performed.

Top 10 (28 February - 1 March)
Contestant	Performed on	Song
Amritha Rajan	Night 1	"Meri Zindagi Mein Aaye Ho" and "No Entry: Ishq Di Galli Vich"
Suhail	Night 1	"Meri Zindagi Tera Pyaar"
Shreenidhi Shastry	Night 1	"Ek Ladki Ko Dekha Toh Aisa Laga" and "Ladki Hai Kya Re Baba"
Anshika Chonkar	Night 1	"Kate Nahin Kat Te"
Tanishk Shukla	Night 1	"Kuchh Na Kaho" and "Keh Do Ke Tum"
Jyotirmayee Nayak	Night 2	"Holi Ke Din" and "Ang Se Ang Lagana"
Abhishek Kumar	Night 2	"Rang Barse"
Ankita Mahua Giri	Night 2	"Balam Pichkari"
Manraj Veer Singh	Night 2	"Aahun Aahun" and "Jai Jai Shiv Shankar"
Diwakar Choubey	Night 2	"Hori Khele Raghuveera"

=== Gala 18: Top 10 (Part 1) – Idol Ka Mohalla ===
This week was the seventh judges's score week and the seventh elimination took place on basis of last two weeks' votes and this week's scores. Contestants are listed in the order they performed.

Top 10 (7-8 March)
Contestant	Performed on	Song	Result (Gala 16+17+18)
Manraj Veer Singh and Anshika Chonkar	Night 1	"Dilliwaali Girlfriend"	
Abhishek Kumar	Night 1	"Ishq Jalakar (Karvaan)"	Safe
Anshika Chonkar	Night 1	"Be Intehaan"	Safe
Tanishk Shukla	Night 1	"Likhe Jo Khat Tujhe"	Safe
Diwakar Choubey	Night 1	"Main Shair To Nahin"	Safe
Jyotirmayee Nayak	Night 1	"Sun Sahiba Sun"	Bottom two
Shreenidhi Shastry	Night 2	"Chahiye Thoda Pyar"	Eliminated
Amritha Rajan	Night 2	"Chadti Jawani Meri Chaal Mastani"	Safe
Ankita Mahua Giri	Night 2	"Kahi Na Jaa, Aaj Kahi Mat Jaa"	Safe
Tanishk Shukla and Jyotirmayee Nayak	Night 2	"Mera Mann"	
Suhail	Night 2	"Tumse Milke Dil Ka"	Safe
Manraj Veer Singh	Night 2	"Ae Dil Hai Mushkil"	Safe
Diwakar Choubey and Ankita Mahua Giri	Night 2	"Wada Kar Le Sajna"	

=== Gala 19: Top 9 – Laxmikant Pyarelal Special ===
This week was the tenth public voting week. Contestants are listed in the order they performed.

Top 9 (14-15 March)
Contestant	Performed on	Song
Jyotirmayee Nayak	Night 1	"Dheere Dheere Bol, Koi Sun Na Le" and "Hansta Hua Noorani Chehra"
Suhail	Night 1	"Aane Se Uske Aaye Bahar" and "Parda Hai Parda"
Ankita Mahua Giri	Night 1	"Zindagi Ki Na Toote Ladi" and "Roz Sham Aati Thi"
Manraj Veer Singh	Night 1	"Mere Mehboob Qayamat Hogi" and "Main Jat Yamla Pagla Deewana"
Tanishk Shukla	Night 1	"Patthar Ke Sanam" and "Gulabi Aankhen"
Manraj Veer Singh and Suhail	Night 1	"Chal Mere Bhai"
Abhishek Kumar	Night 2	"Hum To Tere Aashiq Hain" and "My Name Is Anthony Gonsalves"
Anshika Chonkar	Night 2	"Woh Hain Zara Khafa Khafa" and "Na Mangun Sona Chandi"
Amritha Rajan	Night 2	"Dhal Gaya Din Ho Gayi Sham" and "Na Jaane Kahan Se Aayi Hai"
Diwakar Choubey	Night 2	"Sawan Ka Mahina" and "Jumma Chumma De De"
Tanishk Shukla and Jyotirmayee Nayak	Night 2	"Aya Sawan Jhoom Ke"

=== Gala 20: Top 9 – Dream Duet ===
This week was the eleventh public voting week. Contestants are listed in the order they performed.

Top 9 (21-22 March)
Contestant	Performed on	Song
Anshika Chonkar and Diwakar Choubey	Night 1	"Mujhe Pyar Hua Allahmiya"
Diwakar Choubey	Night 1	"Badi Mushkil Hai" and "Baadshah, O Baadshah"
Jyotirmayee Nayak	Night 1	"Nimbooda"
Manraj Veer Singh	Night 1	"Roop Tera Mastana" and "Hadh Kar Di Aapne"
Ankita Mahua Giri	Night 1	"Yeh Dil Sun Raha Hain"
Ankita Mahua Giri and Abhishek Kumar	Night 1	"Aye Dil Laya Hai Bahaar"
Tanishk Shukla and Jyotirmayee Nayak	Night 2	"Hum To Deewane Hue Yaar"
Abhishek Kumar	Night 2	"Chaand Taare"
Suhail	Night 2	"Hai Agar Dushman Zamana, Gham Nahin"
Anshika Chonkar with Abhijeet Da and Kavita Krishnamurthy	Night 2	"Tauba Tumhare Yeh Ishare" and "Kay Sera Sera"
Tanishk Shukla	Night 2	"Aur Kya"
Amritha Rajan	Night 2	"Hum Dil De Chuke Sanam"
Ankita Mahua Giri and Suhail	Night 2	"Yeh Jo Teri Payalon Ki Chan Chan Hai"

=== Gala 21: Top 9 – Celebrating Bollywood's Sweet 16 ===
This week was the eight judges's score week and the eighth elimination took place on basis of last two weeks' votes and this week's scores. Contestants are listed in the order they performed.

Top 9 (28-29 March)
Contestant	Performed on	Song	Result (Gala 19+20+21)
Amritha Rajan	Night 1	"Thoda Resham Lagta Hai" and "Yeh Ladka Hai Deewana"	Eliminated
Diwakar Choubey	Night 1	"Bholi Si Surat" and "Humne Tumko Dekha"	Safe
Ankita Mahua Giri	Night 1	"Ab Jo Mile Hain To" and "Daiya Yeh Main Kahan"	Safe
Suhail	Night 1	"Hamen Tumse Pyar Kitna" and "Gore Gore Mukhde Pe"	Safe
Jyotirmayee Nayak and Tanishk Shukla	Night 1	"Muthukodi Kawadi Hada"	
Manraj Veer Singh and Anshika Chonkar	Night 1	"Kuch Kuch Hota Hai"	
Abhishek Kumar	Night 2	"Dekh Sakta Hoon Main Kuch Bhi Hote Hue" and "Mere Mehboob Mere Sanam"	Safe
Tanishk Shukla	Night 2	"Tere Jaisa Yaar Kahan" and "Zindagi Ek Safar Hai Suhana (Male Version)"	Bottom three
Jyotirmayee Nayak	Night 2	"Koi Shehri Babu" and "Dil To Pagal Hai"	Bottom three
Anshika Chonkar	Night 2	"Dilbar Dil Se Pyare" and "Mere Khwabon Mein"	Safe
Manraj Veer Singh	Night 2	"Sara Zamana" and "Dil Ne Dil Ko Pukara"	Safe
Ankita Mahua Giri and Amritha Rajan	Night 2	"Ae Ae Ae Phansa"	
Ankita Mahua Giri and Abhishek Kumar	Night 2	"Ek Shararat Hone Ko Hai"	

=== Gala 22: Top 8 (Part 1) – Golden Jubilee ===
This week was the twelfth public voting week. Contestants are listed in the order they performed.

Top 8 (4 April)
Contestant	Song
Jyotirmayee Nayak	"Pyar Kiya To Darna Kya"
Ankita Mahua Giri	"Lekar Hum Deewana Dil, Phirte Hai Manzil Manzil"
Anshika Chonkar	"Aao Huzoor Tumko" and "Pyar Dilon Ka Mela Hai"
Manraj Veer Singh	"Jaan-E-Jaan Dhoondta Phir Raha Hoon Tumhe Raat Din"
Tanishk Shukla	"Deewana Hua Badal, Sawan Ki Ghata Chhayi" and "An Evening In Paris"
Diwakar Choubey	"Paisa Yeh Paisa"
Abhishek Kumar	"Tera Mujhse Hain Pehle Ka Nata Koi"
Suhail	"Chalat Musafir"

=== Gala 23: Top 8 (Part 1) – Indian Idol Reunion ===
This week was the thirteenth public voting week. Contestants are listed in the order they performed. This week featured contestants from previous seasons as well with Myscmme Bosu and Chaitanya Devadhe joining as wildcard contestants going forward.

Top 8 (11-12 April)
Contestant	Performed on	Song
Anshika Chonkar and Manasi Ghosh	Night 1	"Aa Zara"
Vaibhav Gupta and Subhadeep Das Chowdhury	Night 1	"Destiny – Mann Atkeya" and "Ishq Jalakar (Karvaan)"
Jyotirmayee Nayak and Sayli Kamble Patil	Night 1	"Kajra Mohabbat Wala"
Tanishk Shukla and Myscmme Bosu	Night 1	"Isharon Isharon Mein Dil Lenewale"
Salman Ali	Night 1	"Sajdaa"
Diwakar Choubey and Chaitanya Devadhe (Mauli)	Night 1	"Dil Haara"
Pawandeep Rajan	Night 1	"Shayad"
Sneha Shankar	Night 1	"Yaad Piya Ki Aaye"
Ankita Mahua Giri and Subhajit Chakraborty	Night 2	"E Tuku Bhalobasa" and "Bol Na Halke Halke"
Rishi Singh	Night 2	"Pehla Pyaar"
Anshika Chonkar and Pawandeep Rajan	Night 2	"Khamoshiyan"
Suhail and Sneha Shankar	Night 2	"Dama Dam Mast Qalandar"
Manraj Veer Singh and Manasi Ghosh	Night 2	"Bang Bang"
Chaitanya, Salman, Subhadeep and Vaibhav	Night 2	"Ramta Jogi"
Abhishek Kumar and Subhadeep Das Chowdhury	Night 2	"Ek Chatur Naar Karke Sringar"
Manasi Ghosh	Night 2	"Haan Maine Chukar Dekha Hai"

=== Gala 24: Top 10 (Part 2) – Two Themes Special ===
This week was divided into two themes

This week was the fourteenth public voting week. Contestants are listed in the order they performed.

Top 10 (18-19 April)
Contestant	Performed on	Song
Diwakar Choubey	Night 1	"Neeche Phoolon Ki Dukan"
Ankita Mahua Giri	Night 1	"Pehle Kabhi Na Mera Haal"
Anshika Chonkar	Night 1	"Yaad Aa Rahi Hai" and "Dekho Maine Dekha Hai Ek Sapna"
Chaitanya Devadhe (Mauli)	Night 1	"Say Shava Shava" and "Chali Chali Phir"
Suhail	Night 1	"Layi Vi Na Gayee"
Abhishek Kumar	Night 2	"Ae Kash Ke Hum"
Jyotirmayee Nayak	Night 2	"Waada Raha Sanam"
Myscmme Bosu	Night 2	"Jo Haal Dil Ka"
Tanishk Shukla	Night 2	"Mujhe Raat Din Bas"
Manraj Veer Singh	Night 2	"O O Jaane Jaana" and "Tune Mujhe Pehchana Nahi"

=== Gala 25: Top 10 (Part 2) – Celebrating Bhatt's ===
This week was the fifteenth public voting week. Contestants are listed in the order they performed.

Top 10 (25-26 April)
Contestant	Performed on	Song
Manraj Veer Singh	Night 1	"Kaho Na Kaho", "Ab Tere Bin" and "Ya Ali"
Anshika Chonkar	Night 1	"Dil Ko Hazar Bar" and "Roop Suhana Lagta Hai"
Chaitanya Devadhe (Mauli)	Night 1	"Jiya Dhadak Dhadak"
Abhishek Kumar	Night 1	"Ek Sanam Chahiye Aashiqui Ke Liye"
Jyotirmayee Nayak	Night 1	"Ghoonghat Ki Aadh Se"
Myscmme Bosu & Tanishk Shukla	Night 2	"Tu Pyar Hai Kisi Aur Ka"
Ankita Mahua Giri	Night 2	"Gali Mein Chand (Happy Version)"
Myscmme Bosu	Night 2	"Jadu Hai Nasha Hai" and "Dil Hai Ke Manta Nahin"
Suhail	Night 2	"Mann Ki Lagan"
Tanishk Shukla	Night 2	"Tere Dar Par Sanam (Male Version)"
Diwakar Choubey	Night 2	"Tumhein Apna Banane Ki"

=== Gala 26: Top 10 (Part 2) – Remembering The Legend Asha Bhosle ===
This week was the sixteenth public voting week. Contestants are listed in the order they performed.

Top 10 (2-3 May)
Contestant	Performed on	Song
Abhishek Kumar	Night 1	"Nigahein Milane Ko Jee Chahata Hai"
Anshika Chonkar	Night 1	"Dil Cheez Kya Hai Aap Meri Jaan Lijiye" and "Piya Tu Ab Toh Aaja"
Suhail	Night 1	"Yeh Parda Hata Do"
Jyotirmayee Nayak	Night 1	"Jhumka Gira Re" and "Hungama Ho Gaya"
Ankita Mahua Giri	Night 1	"Roz Roz Aankhon Tale" and "Pyaar Karne Wale Pyaar Karte Hai Shaan Se"
Manraj Veer Singh & Anshika Chonkar	Night 1	"Ek Main Aur Ekk Tu"
Myscmme Bosu & Tanishk Shukla	Night 1	"Yeh Raatein Yeh Mausam"
Jyotirmayee Nayak & Abhishek Kumar	Night 2	"O Mere Sona Re"
Diwakar Choubey	Night 2	"Aaja Aaja Main Hoon Pyar Tera"
Manraj Veer Singh	Night 2	"O Haseena Zulfon Wali"
Chaitanya Devadhe (Mauli)	Night 2	"Janu Meri Jaan"
Myscmme Bosu	Night 2	"In Aakhon Ki Masti" and "Yeh Mera Dil"
Tanishk Shukla	Night 2	"Abhi Na Jao Chhod Kar"
Ankita Mahua Giri & Diwakar Choubey	Night 2	"O Sathi Chal"

=== Gala 27: Top 10 (Part 2) – Celebrating Legends Shankar–Jaikishan ===
This week was the seventeenth public voting week. Contestants are listed in the order they performed.

Top 10 (9-10 May)
Contestant	Performed on	Song
Abhishek Kumar	Night 1	"Tum Mujhe Yun Bhula Na Paaoge"
Ankita Mahua Giri	Night 1	"Ajeeb Dastan Hai Yeh" & "Unse Mili Nazar Ke Mere Hosh Ud Gaye"
Anshika Chonkar	Night 1	"Parde Mein Rehne Do"
Chaitanya Devadhe (Mauli)	Night 1	"Ehsaan Tera Hoga Mujh Par" & "Bhanware Ki Gunjan Hai"
Diwakar Choubey	Night 1	"Tum Se Achcha Kaun Hai"
Chaitanya Devadhe (Mauli) & Diwakar Choubey	Night 1	"Chakke Pe Chakka"
Myscmme Bosu & Tanishk Shukla	Night 1	"Aaja Sanam Madhur Chandni"
Jyotirmayee Nayak	Night 2	"Ghar Aaya Mera Pardesi" & "Aaja Aayi Bahaar"
Manraj Veer Singh	Night 2	"Badan Pe Sitare Lapete Hue"
Myscmme Bosu	Night 2	"Hum Tere Pyar Mein Saara Aalam"
Suhail	Night 2	"Akele Akele Kahan Ja Rahe Ho" & "Dil Ke Jharokhe Mein"
Tanishk Shukla	Night 2	"Baharon Phool Barsao" & "Kaun Hai Jo Sapnon Mein Aaya"
Ankita Mahua Giri & Suhail	Night 2	"Ramaiya Vastavaiya"
Anshika Chonkar & Manraj Veer Singh	Night 2	"Aajkal Tere Mere Pyar Ke Charche"

=== Gala 28: Top 10 (Part 2) – Asha Bhosle Night ===
This week was the eighteenth public voting week. Contestants are listed in the order they performed.

Top 10 (16-17 May)
Contestant	Performed on	Song
Ankita Mahua Giri & Abhishek Kumar	Night 1	"Puchho Na Yaar Kya Hua"
Anshika Chonkar & Jyotirmayee Nayak	Night 1	"Man Kyoon Behka Re Behka Aadhi Raat Ko"
Myscmme Bosu & Suhail	Night 1	"Ek Pardesi Mera Dil Le Gaya"
Tanishk Shukla & Anshika Chonkar	Night 1	"Keh Doon Tumhein Ya Chup Rahoon"
Myscmme Bosu & Manraj Veer Singh	Night 1	"Bachke Rehna Re Baba"
Chaitanya Devadhe (Mauli) & Jyotirmayee Nayak	Night 1	"Haal Kaisa Hai Janab Ka"
Anshika Chonkar & Chaitanya Devadhe (Mauli)	Night 1	"Gumo Sangtina Mazya"
Myscmme Bosu & Ankita Mahua Giri	Night 2	"Aaj Ki Raat Koi Aane Ko Hai"
Abhishek Kumar & Jyotirmayee Nayak	Night 2	"Yeh Ladka Hay Allah Kaisa Hai Diwana"
Chaitanya Devadhe (Mauli) & Ankita Mahua Giri	Night 2	"Lekar Hum Deewana Dil"
Suhail & Jyotirmayee Nayak	Night 2	"Udein Jab Jab Zulfen Teri"
Anshika Chonkar & Manraj Veer Singh	Night 2	"Nahin Nahin Abhi Nahin Abhi Karo Intezar"
Myscmme Bosu & Tanishk Shukla	Night 2	"Gun Guna Rahe Hai Bhanvare"
Ankita Mahua Giri & Diwakar Choubey	Night 2	"Chhod Do Aanchal Zamana Kya Kahega"

=== Gala 29: Top 10 (Part 2) – Celebrating R.D. Burman & Kishore Kumar ===
This week was the nineteenth public voting week. Contestants are listed in the order they performed.

Top 10 (23-24 May)
Contestant	Performed on	Song
Abhishek Kumar	Night 1	"Chingari Koi Bhadke" & "Aise Na Mujhe Tum Dekho"
Diwakar Choubey	Night 1	"Meri Bheegi Bheegi Si" & "Chala Jata Hoon"
Chaitanya Devadhe (Mauli)	Night 1	"Ek Ajnabee Haseena Se" & "Yeh Jawaani Hai Deewani"
Anshika Chonkar	Night 1	"Tere Bina Jiya Jaye Na" & "Jhumroo (Yodel Song)"
Tanishk Shukla	Night 1	"Saagar Jaisi Aankhonwali" & "Kehna Hai Kehna Hai Aaj Tumse Yeh Pehli Baar"
Jyotirmayee Nayak	Night 2	"Bahon Mein Chale Aao" & "Jaane Kaise Kab Kahaan"
Suhail	Night 2	"Mere Samnewali Khidki Mein" & "Koi Haseena"
Manraj Veer Singh	Night 2	"Yeh Jo Mohabbat Hai" & "Jahan Teri Yeh Nazar Hai"
Myscmme Bosu	Night 2	"Tere Bina Zindagi Se Koi Shikwa Toh Nahin" & "O Meri Jaan Main Ne Kahan"
Ankita Mahua Giri	Night 2	"Jaane Kya Baat Hai" & "Aisa Sama Na Hota"

=== Gala 30: Top 10 (Part 2) – Celebrating First Superstar Rajesh Khanna ===
This week was the twentieth public voting week. Contestants are listed in the order they performed.

Top 10 (30-31 May)
Contestant	Performed on	Song
Chaitanya Devadhe (Mauli)	Night 1	"Zindagi Kaisi Hai Paheli Hai, Kabhi To Hasaye" & "Jai Jai Shiv Shankar"
Myscmme Bosu	Night 1	"Aaja Piya Tohe Pyar Doon" & "Saathiya Nahi Jaana"
Tanishk Shukla	Night 1	"Zindagi Ke Safar Mein Guzar Jaate Hai" & "Yeh Reshmi Zulfein"
Diwakar Choubey	Night 1	"Kahin Door Jab Din Dhal Jaye" & "Yeh Sham Mastani"
Manraj Veer Singh	Night 1	"Pyaar Diwana Hota Hai" & "Mere Sapnon Ki Rani"
Anshika Chonkar	Night 1	"Kya Janu Sajan Hoti Hai Kya Gham Ki Shaam"
Abhishek Kumar	Night 2	"Yeh Kya Hua Kaise Hua" & "Mere Naina Sawan Bhadon"
Jyotirmayee Nayak	Night 2	"Bindiya Chamkegi"
Myscmme Bosu & Tanishk Shukla	Night 2	"Achha To Hum Chalte Hain"
Ankita Mahua Giri	Night 2	"Suno Sajna Papihe Ne"
Suhail	Night 2	"Mere Dil Mein Aaj Kya Hai"
Ankita Mahua Giri & Abhishek Kumar	Night 2	"Karvaten Badalte Rahe"

=== Gala 31: Top 10 (Part 2) – The Grand Symphony Night ===
This week was the twenty-first public voting week. Contestants are listed in the order they performed.

Top 10 (6-7 June)
Contestant	Performed on	Song
Chaitanya Devadhe (Mauli)	Night 1	"Mere Naam Tu" & "Are Rafta Rafta Dekho"
Abhishek Kumar	Night 1	"Teri Aankhon Ke Siva" & "Are Diwano Mujhe Pehchano"
Ankita Mahua Giri	Night 1	"Ye Dil Tum Bin Lagta Nahin"
Suhail	Night 1	"Yahoo Chahe Mujhe Koi Junglee Kahen"
Manraj Veer Singh & Tanishk Shukla	Night 1	"Ek Hasina Thi Ek Diwana Tha"
Jyotirmayee Nayak	Night 1	"Do Lafzon Ki Hai Dil Ki Kahani" & "Raat Baaqi Baat Baaqi"
Myscmme Bosu & Abhishek Kumar	Night 1	"Ek Pyar Ka Naghma Hai (Happy)"
Diwakar Choubey	Night 2	"Dard-E-Dil Dard-E-Jigar" & "Yamma Yamma"
Myscmme Bosu	Night 2	"Pyar Karne Wale" & "Hum Dil De Chuke Sanam"
Manraj Veer Singh	Night 2	"Pag Ghungroo Baandh"
Tanishk Shukla	Night 2	"Abhi Mujh Mein Kahin"
Anshika Chonkar	Night 2	"Yeh Kahan Aa Gaye Hum (with Dialogues)"

=== Gala 32: Top 10 (Part 2) – Race To Top 8 ===
The first double elimination of the season happened this week. Ankita Mahua Giri and Diwakar Choubey were both eliminated from Indian Idol Season 16.

Top 10 (13-14 June)
Contestant	Performed on	Song	Result (Gala 24 to 32)
Abhishek Kumar	Night 1	"Ranjish Hi Sahi"	Safe
Chaitanya Devadhe (Mauli)	Night 1	"Saaki" & "Dhan Te Nan"	Safe
Manraj Veer Singh	Night 1	"O Meri Jaan (KK Song)"	Safe
Myscmme Bosu & Tanishk Shukla	Night 1	"Chup Gaye Sare Nazare"	N/A
Suhail	Night 1	"Akhiyaan Udeek Diyaan" & "Dama Dam Mast Qalandar"	Safe
Ankita Mahua Giri	Night 1	"Agar Tum Na Hote"	Eliminated
Diwakar Choubey	Night 2	"Dagabaaz Re" & "Dard - E - Disco"	Eliminated
Myscmme Bosu	Night 2	"Aao Naa" & "Beedi"	Safe
Jyotirmayee Nayak	Night 2	"Ja Re Ja O Harjaee"	Safe
Anshika Chonkar	Night 2	"Alvida (KK Song)"	Safe
Tanishk Shukla	Night 2	"Chaudhavin Ka Chand Ho" & "Yeh Dil Na Hota Bechara"	Safe

=== Gala 33: Top 8 (Part 2) – Two Themes Special ===
This week was divided into two themes

This week was the twenty-second public voting week. Contestants are listed in the order they performed.

Top 8 (20-21 June)
Contestant	Performed on	Song
Abhishek Kumar	Night 1	"Khoya Khoya Chand Khula Aasman"
Manraj Veer Singh	Night 1	"Ruk Jaana O Jaana Humse"
Myscmme Bosu	Night 1	"Rangeela Re Tere Rang Mein"
Chaitanya Devadhe (Mauli)	Night 1	"Hai Apna Dil Toh Awaara" & "Churi Nahin Yeh Mera Dil Hai"
Anshika Chonkar	Night 1	"Raat Akeli Hai Bujh Gaye Diye"
Tanishk Shukla	Night 1	"Tere Mere Sapne Ab Ek Rang Hain"
Suhail	Night 1	"Pal Bhar Ke Liye"
Jyotirmayee Nayak	Night 1	"Tera Mera Pyar Amar"
Jyotirmayee Nayak	Night 2	"Tere Sang Pyar Main Nahin Todna"
Manraj Veer Singh	Night 2	"Mast Baharon Ka Main Aashiq"
Anshika Chonkar	Night 2	"Mere Naseeb Mein"
Myscmme Bosu	Night 2	"Tera Mujhse Hai Pehle Ka Naata Koi"
Abhishek Kumar	Night 2	"Musafir Hoon Yaron" & "Taki Taki"
Tanishk Shukla	Night 2	"Kitna Pyara Wada Hai" & "Hum To Tere Aashiq Hain"
Suhail	Night 2	"Salamat Rahe Dostana Hamara" & Janu Meri Jaan"
Chaitanya Devadhe (Mauli)	Night 2	"Zindagi Imtihan Leti Hai" & "Aane Se Uske Aaye Bahar"

=== Gala 34: Top 8 (Part 2) – Cassette Classics ===
Abhishek Kumar was eliminated from Indian Idol Season 16.

Top 8 (27-28 June)
Contestant	Performed on	Song	Result (Gala 33+34)
Suhail	Night 1	"Vaada Tera Vaada" & "O Meri Sharmilee"	Safe
Myscmme Bosu & Tanishk Shukla	Night 1	"Gaata Rahe Mera Dil"	N/A
Jyotirmayee Nayak	Night 1	"Tere Mere Beech Mein (Duet)"	Safe
Manraj Veer Singh	Night 1	"Saamne Yeh Kaun Aaya" & "Eeena Meena Deeka"	Safe
Anshika Chonkar & Myscmme Bosu	Night 1	"Teri Mehfil Mein Kismat Azmakar"	N/A
Abhishek Kumar	Night 1	"Kuch Toh Log Kahenge" & "Chahiye Thoda Pyar"	Eliminated
Suhail & Chaitanya Devadhe (Mauli)	Night 2	"O Manchali Kahan Chali"	N/A
Myscmme Bosu	Night 2	"O Sajna Barkha Bahar Aayi" & "Bangle Ke Peeche"	Safe
Chaitanya Devadhe (Mauli)	Night 2	"Khaike Paan Banaraswala"	Safe
Anshika Chonkar	Night 2	"Aap Ki Nazron Ne Samjha" & "Aa Jaane Jaan"	Safe
Tanishk Shukla	Night 2	"Ruk Jaana Nahin Tu Kahin Haar Ke" & "De De Pyaar De"	Safe

=== Gala 35: Top 7 – Diamond Jubilee Celebration ===
This week was the twenty-third public voting week. Contestants are listed in the order they performed.

Top 7 (4-5 July)
Contestant	Performed on	Song
Myscmme Bosu and Nihal Tauro	Night 1	"Janam Janam"
Shanmukha Priya and Anshika Chonkar	Night 1	"Dum Maro Dum"
Chaitanya Devadhe (Mauli) and Salman Ali	Night 1	"Jee Karda (Divya Kumar Song)"
Tanishk Shukla and Prajakta Sukhre	Night 1	"O Sathi Chal"
Manasi Ghosh and Manraj Veer Singh	Night 1	"Kay Sera Sera" and "Ainvayi Ainvayi"
Chaitanya Devadhe (Mauli) and Sneha Shankar	Night 1	"Der Na Ho Jaye Kahin"
Sreerama Chandra and Jyotirmayee Nayak	Night 2	"Mere Dholna"
Myscmme Bosu and Pawandeep Rajan	Night 2	"Dhak Dhak" and "Kuch Kuch Hota Hai"
Mohammed Danish and Suhail	Night 2	"Chaap Tilak"
Asees Kaur and Manraj Veer Singh	Night 2	"Ve Kamleya (Sufi Version)" and "Auva Auva Koi Yahan Nache"
Ashish Kulkarni and Jyotirmayee Nayak	Night 2	"Bin Tere Sanam"
Sreerama Chandra and Anshika Chonkar	Night 2	"Subhanallah" and "O Humdum Suniyo Re"
Chaitanya, Danish, Salman and Vaibhav	Night 2	"Deva Shree Ganesha"

=== Gala 36: Top 7 – The Superhit Classics (Badshah's Playlist) ===
Chaitanya Devadhe (Mauli) was eliminated from Indian Idol Season 16 for the first time.

Top 7 (11-12 July)
Contestant	Performed on	Song	Result (Gala 35+36)
Suhail & Jyotirmayee Nayak	Night 1	"Maine Pyar Tumhi Se Kiya Hai from Phool Aur Kaante (1991)"	N/A
Anshika Chonkar & Manraj Veer Singh	Night 1	"Aa Aa E Ooh Ooh Ooh Mera Dil Na Todo from Raja Babu (1994)"	N/A
Chaitanya Devadhe (Mauli)	Night 1	"Tere Naam (Sad Version) from Tere Naam (2003)" & "Phoolon Sa Chehra Tera from Anari (1993)"	Eliminated
Anshika Chonkar & Tanishk Shukla	Night 1	"Gazab Ka Hai Din from Qayamat Se Qayamat Tak (1988)"	N/A
Myscmme Bosu	Night 1	"Bahut Pyar Karte Hai (Female Version) from Saajan (1991)" & "Tamma Tamma Loge from Thanedaar (1990)"	Safe
Suhail	Night 1	"Dil De Diya Hai from Masti (2004)" & "Main Toh Raste Se Ja Raha Tha from Coolie No. 1 (1995)"	Safe
Chaitanya Devadhe (Mauli) & Manraj Veer Singh	Night 1	"Sochenge Tumhe Pyar from Deewana (1992)"	N/A
Myscmme Bosu & Manraj Veer Singh	Night 2	"Akele Hain To Kya Gam Hai from Qayamat Se Qayamat Tak (1988)"	N/A
Anshika Chonkar	Night 2	"Maahi Ve from Kaante (2002)" & "Ishq Samundar from Kaante (2002)"	Safe
Myscmme Bosu & Tanishk Shukla	Night 2	"Dil Hai Ke Manta Nahin from Dil Hai Ke Manta Nahin (1991)"	N/A
Jyotirmayee Nayak	Night 2	"Nazar Ke Samne from Aashiqui (1990)" & "Too Mera Hero Hai from Hero (1983)"	Safe
Tanishk Shukla	Night 2	"O Rabba Koi To Bataye from Sangeet (1992)" & "Papa Kehte Hain from Qayamat Se Qayamat Tak (1988)"	Safe
Manraj Veer Singh	Night 2	"Tum Dil Ki Dhadkan Mein from Dhadkan (2000)" & "Ole Ole from Yeh Dillagi (1994)"	Safe

=== Gala 37: Top 6 – 60 Years Of Hema Malini (Semi-Final) ===
Indian Idol Season 16 Grand Finale has arrived on the 25th and 26th of July this year in 2026.

Top 6 (18-19 July)
Contestant	Performed on	Song
Jyotirmayee Nayak	Night 1	"Mere Naseeb Mein"
Anshika Chonkar	Night 1	"Aye Dil-E-Nadan" & "O Mere Raja"
Manraj Veer Singh	Night 1	"Tere Chehre Mein Woh Jadoo Hai"
Tanishk Shukla	Night 1	"Dream Girl"
Myscmme Bosu	Night 1	"Hamen Tumse Pyar Kitna" & "Wada Kar Le Sajna"
Suhail	Night 1	"Main Jat Yamla Pagla Deewana"
Anshika Chonkar & Manraj Veer Singh	Night 1	"Kya Khoob Lagti Ho"
Suhail & Jyotirmayee Nayak	Night 2	"Dil Use Do Jo Jaan De De"
Tanishk Shukla	Night 2	"Kal Ki Haseen Mulaqat Ke Liye" & "Tera Peechha Na Chhodunga"
Suhail	Night 2	"Zindagi Ki Na Toote Ladi" & "Koi Haseena"
Jyotirmayee Nayak	Night 2	"Do Nainon Mein Ansoo Bhare Hai" & "Jab Tak Hai Jaan"
Manraj Veer Singh	Night 2	"Tu Mere Sapnon Ki Rani Banegi" & "Zindagi Ek Safar Hai Suhana (Male Version)"
Myscmme Bosu	Night 2	"Naam Goom Jayega" & "Tune O Rangeele"
Anshika Chonkar	Night 2	"O Dharti Tarse Amber Barse" & "Tu Kya Jane O Bewafa"

=== Gala 38: Top 6 – Historic Grand Finale ===
- Special Guests: Usha Uthup, Udit Narayan, Papon, Kumar Sanu, Shehnaaz Gill, Urmila Matondkar

Last Day Of Indian Idol Season 16 (Sunday, July 26th, 2026)

== Elimination chart ==
Like last season, this season too, bi-weekly eliminations were held. One week public votes, next week, judges' scores. The bottom contestants are decided according to the judges' scores from that week, and the person with lowest votes from last week is eliminated. Indian Idol Season 16 Grand Finale has arrived on the 25th and 26th of July this year in 2026.

Winner
Runner-up
Third place
Fourth place
Sixth place
Did not perform
Saved by the judges scores
Bottom
Eliminated

Indian Idol season 16 – Eliminations
Contestant	Place	Top 29		Top 16	Top 15	Top 14	Top 13	Top 12	Top 11	Top 10 (Part 1)	Top 9	Top 8 (Part 1)	Top 10 (Part 2)	Top 8 (Part 2)	Top 7	Top 6
Contestant	Place	Theatre		Gala 1+2+3	Gala 4+5	Gala 6+7	Gala 8+9+10+11	Gala 12+13	Gala 14+15	Gala 16+17+18	Gala 19+20+21	Gala 22+23	Gala 24 to 32	Gala 33+34	Gala 35+36	Gala 37+38
Contestant	Place	1/11	2/11	8/11–23/11	29/11–7/12	13/12–21/12	27/12–18/1	24/1–1/2	7/2–15/2	21/2–8/3	14/3–29/3	4/4–12/4	18/4–14/6	20/6–28/6	4/7–12/7	18/7–26/7
Jyotirmayee Nayak	1	N/A	Safe	Bottom four	Safe			Bottom three		Bottom two	Bottom three	Safe		Bottom three	Safe	Winner
Tanishk Shukla	2	N/A	Safe	Bottom four	Safe		Bottom three	Safe			Bottom three	Safe			Bottom three	1st Runner-Up
Manraj Veer Singh	3	N/A		Safe		Bottom three	Safe						Bottom three	Safe		2nd Runner-Up
Suhail	4	N/A	Safe											Bottom three		3rd Runner-Up
Anshika Chonkar	5	N/A		Safe												4th Runner-Up
Myscmme Bosu	6	Wildcard											Safe			Eliminated
Chaitanya Devadhe (Mauli)	7	Wildcard											Safe		Eliminated	
Abhishek Kumar	8	N/A		Safe										Eliminated		
Ankita Mahua Giri	9	Safe											Eliminated			
Diwakar Choubey	9	N/A		Safe									Eliminated			
Amritha Rajan	11	Safe					Bottom three	Safe			Eliminated					
Shreenidhi Shastry	12	N/A	Safe						Bottom three	Eliminated						
Sugandha Date	13	N/A	Safe					Bottom three	Eliminated							
Shreya Verma	14	N/A	Safe					Eliminated								
Abhijeet Sharma	15	N/A	Safe		Bottom three		Eliminated									
Banashree Biswas	16	Safe		Bottom four	Bottom three	Eliminated										
Manav	17	Safe			Eliminated											
Arfin Rana	18	Safe		Eliminated												
Aakarshit Wadhwan		N/A	Eliminated													
Aarti Shankar		N/A	Eliminated													
Dharmesh Nayat		N/A	Eliminated													
Vishwanath Haveri		N/A	Eliminated													
Vishal Mattu		N/A	Eliminated													
Hrishikesh Karmarkar		N/A	Eliminated													
Sankalp Yaduwanshi		N/A	Eliminated													
Jayanti Dutta		N/A	Eliminated													
Anurag Bhattacharya		Eliminated														
Tabish Ali		Eliminated														
Kalyan Sahay		Eliminated														
Premika Jain		Eliminated														
Rakhi		Eliminated														
Saheli Paul																
Sonika Kumari																

== Production ==
The project head for the season was Chitra Langeh, and Akash Tiwari wasagain joining the head of production. Pratyush Prakash was the writer of the series. Music guidance and music band were headed by Anand Sharma and Randeep Bhaskar. Aradhana Bhola, the managing director of FremantleIndia was the executive producer of the series. The season was directed by Saahil Chhabria. Culver Max Entertainment Private Limited took the whole charge again.
