= Paan Khaye Saiyan Hamaro =

Song by Asha Bhosle

from the album Teesri Kasam
- Language: Hindi
- Genre: parody
- Composer: Shankar Jaikishan
- Lyricist: Shailendra

"Paan Khaye Saiyan Hamaro" (English: "My Darling Eats Betel-leaf") is a Hindi song from the Indian film Teesri Kasam (1966). It was composed by Shankar Jaikishan and penned by Shailendra. The song was sung by Asha Bhosle and picturised on Waheeda Rahman. It went on to become one of the most popular Hindi songs. It is widely considered as one of the best dance numbers in Bollywood history. Waheeda Rahman's dance and the melodious music has propelled the song as a great dance song. This song is also featured in the 1977 film Hatyara.
